= List of Asian Games medalists in badminton =

This is the complete list of Asian Games medalists in badminton from 1962 to 2026.

== Men's singles ==
Games	Gold	Silver	Bronze
1962 Jakarta	Tan Joe Hok (INA)	Teh Kew San (MAL)	Ferry Sonneville (INA)
1966 Bangkok	Ang Tjin Siang (INA)	Wong Pek Sen (INA)	Kyi Nyunt (BIR)
1966 Bangkok	Ang Tjin Siang (INA)	Wong Pek Sen (INA)	Masao Akiyama (JPN)
1970 Bangkok	Punch Gunalan (MAL)	Muljadi (INA)	Ippei Kojima (JPN)
1970 Bangkok	Punch Gunalan (MAL)	Muljadi (INA)	Sangob Rattanusorn (THA)
1974 Tehran	Hou Jiachang (CHN)	Fang Kaixiang (CHN)	Liem Swie King (INA)
1978 Bangkok	Liem Swie King (INA)	Han Jian (CHN)	Luan Jin (CHN)
1978 Bangkok	Liem Swie King (INA)	Han Jian (CHN)	Iie Sumirat (INA)
1982 New Delhi	Han Jian (CHN)	Liem Swie King (INA)	Chen Changjie (CHN)
1982 New Delhi	Han Jian (CHN)	Liem Swie King (INA)	Syed Modi (IND)
1986 Seoul	Zhao Jianhua (CHN)	Yang Yang (CHN)	Park Sung-bae (KOR)
1986 Seoul	Zhao Jianhua (CHN)	Yang Yang (CHN)	Sung Han-kook (KOR)
1990 Beijing	Zhao Jianhua (CHN)	Yang Yang (CHN)	Alan Budikusuma (INA)
1990 Beijing	Zhao Jianhua (CHN)	Yang Yang (CHN)	Rashid Sidek (MAL)
1994 Hiroshima	Hariyanto Arbi (INA)	Joko Suprianto (INA)	Dong Jiong (CHN)
1994 Hiroshima	Hariyanto Arbi (INA)	Joko Suprianto (INA)	Kim Hak-kyun (KOR)
1998 Bangkok	Dong Jiong (CHN)	Hendrawan (INA)	Sun Jun (CHN)
1998 Bangkok	Dong Jiong (CHN)	Hendrawan (INA)	Yong Hock Kin (MAS)
2002 Busan	Taufik Hidayat (INA)	Lee Hyun-il (KOR)	Hendrawan (INA)
2002 Busan	Taufik Hidayat (INA)	Lee Hyun-il (KOR)	Shon Seung-mo (KOR)
2006 Doha	Taufik Hidayat (INA)	Lin Dan (CHN)	Lee Hyun-il (KOR)
2006 Doha	Taufik Hidayat (INA)	Lin Dan (CHN)	Lee Chong Wei (MAS)
2010 Guangzhou	Lin Dan (CHN)	Lee Chong Wei (MAS)	Chen Jin (CHN)
2010 Guangzhou	Lin Dan (CHN)	Lee Chong Wei (MAS)	Park Sung-hwan (KOR)
2014 Incheon	Lin Dan (CHN)	Chen Long (CHN)	Wei Nan (HKG)
2014 Incheon	Lin Dan (CHN)	Chen Long (CHN)	Lee Chong Wei (MAS)
2018 Jakarta–Palembang	Jonatan Christie (INA)	Chou Tien-chen (TPE)	Anthony Sinisuka Ginting (INA)
2018 Jakarta–Palembang	Jonatan Christie (INA)	Chou Tien-chen (TPE)	Kenta Nishimoto (JPN)
2022 Hangzhou	Li Shifeng (CHN)	Shi Yuqi (CHN)	Prannoy H. S. (IND)
2022 Hangzhou	Li Shifeng (CHN)	Shi Yuqi (CHN)	Kodai Naraoka (JPN)
2026 Aichi–Nagoya	Kunlavut Vitidsarn (THA)	Loh Kean Yew (SGP)	Yoo Tae-bin (KOR)
2026 Aichi–Nagoya	Kunlavut Vitidsarn (THA)	Loh Kean Yew (SGP)	Alwi Farhan (INA)

== Men's doubles ==
Games	Gold	Silver	Bronze
1962 Jakarta	Tan Yee Khan and Ng Boon Bee (MAL)	Tan Joe Hok and Liem Tjeng Kiang (INA)	Tutang Djamaluddin and Abdul Patah Unang (INA)
1966 Bangkok	Ng Boon Bee and Tan Yee Khan (MAL)	Ang Tjin Siang and Tjoa Tjong Boan (INA)	Tan King Gwan and Abdul Patah Unang (INA)
1966 Bangkok	Ng Boon Bee and Tan Yee Khan (MAL)	Ang Tjin Siang and Tjoa Tjong Boan (INA)	Charoen Wattanasin and Tuly Ulao (THA)
1970 Bangkok	Ng Boon Bee and Punch Gunalan (MAL)	Junji Honma and Shoichi Toganoo (JPN)	Rudy Hartono and Indra Gunawan (INA)
1970 Bangkok	Ng Boon Bee and Punch Gunalan (MAL)	Junji Honma and Shoichi Toganoo (JPN)	Chavalert Chumkum and Pornchai Sakuntaniyom (THA)
1974 Tehran	Tjun Tjun and Johan Wahjudi (INA)	Christian Hadinata and Ade Chandra (INA)	Tang Xianhu and Chen Tianxiang (CHN)
1978 Bangkok	Ade Chandra and Christian Hadinata (INA)	Tang Xianhu and Lin Shiquan (CHN)	Hou Jiachang and Yu Yaodong (CHN)
1978 Bangkok	Ade Chandra and Christian Hadinata (INA)	Tang Xianhu and Lin Shiquan (CHN)	Fu Han Ping and Wong Man Hing (HKG)
1982 New Delhi	Icuk Sugiarto and Christian Hadinata (INA)	Luan Jin and Lin Jiangli (CHN)	Leroy D'Sa and Pradeep Gandhe (IND)
1982 New Delhi	Icuk Sugiarto and Christian Hadinata (INA)	Luan Jin and Lin Jiangli (CHN)	Park Joo-bong and Lee Eun-ku (KOR)
1986 Seoul	Park Joo-bong and Kim Moon-soo (KOR)	Tian Bingyi and Li Yongbo (CHN)	Ding Qiqing and Chen Kang (CHN)
1986 Seoul	Park Joo-bong and Kim Moon-soo (KOR)	Tian Bingyi and Li Yongbo (CHN)	Liem Swie King and Bobby Ertanto (INA)
1990 Beijing	Tian Bingyi and Li Yongbo (CHN)	Park Joo-bong and Kim Moon-soo (KOR)	Eddy Hartono and Rudy Gunawan (INA)
1990 Beijing	Tian Bingyi and Li Yongbo (CHN)	Park Joo-bong and Kim Moon-soo (KOR)	Razif Sidek and Jalani Sidek (MAL)
1994 Hiroshima	Rexy Mainaky and Ricky Subagja (INA)	Cheah Soon Kit and Soo Beng Kiang (MAS)	Chen Kang and Chen Hongyong (CHN)
1994 Hiroshima	Rexy Mainaky and Ricky Subagja (INA)	Cheah Soon Kit and Soo Beng Kiang (MAS)	Jiang Xin and Huang Zhanzhong (CHN)
1998 Bangkok	Ricky Subagja and Rexy Mainaky (INA)	Pramote Teerawiwatana and Siripong Siripool (THA)	Liu Yong and Yu Jinhao (CHN)
1998 Bangkok	Ricky Subagja and Rexy Mainaky (INA)	Pramote Teerawiwatana and Siripong Siripool (THA)	Lee Dong-soo and Yoo Yong-sung (KOR)
2002 Busan	Lee Dong-soo and Yoo Yong-sung (KOR)	Pramote Teerawiwatana and Tesana Panvisvas (THA)	Halim Haryanto and Tri Kusharjanto (INA)
2002 Busan	Lee Dong-soo and Yoo Yong-sung (KOR)	Pramote Teerawiwatana and Tesana Panvisvas (THA)	Chan Chong Ming and Chew Choon Eng (MAS)
2006 Doha	Koo Kien Keat and Tan Boon Heong (MAS)	Luluk Hadiyanto and Alvent Yulianto (INA)	Markis Kido and Hendra Setiawan (INA)
2006 Doha	Koo Kien Keat and Tan Boon Heong (MAS)	Luluk Hadiyanto and Alvent Yulianto (INA)	Jung Jae-sung and Lee Yong-dae (KOR)
2010 Guangzhou	Markis Kido and Hendra Setiawan (INA)	Koo Kien Keat and Tan Boon Heong (MAS)	Mohammad Ahsan and Alvent Yulianto (INA)
2010 Guangzhou	Markis Kido and Hendra Setiawan (INA)	Koo Kien Keat and Tan Boon Heong (MAS)	Jung Jae-sung and Lee Yong-dae (KOR)
2014 Incheon	Mohammad Ahsan and Hendra Setiawan (INA)	Lee Yong-dae and Yoo Yeon-seong (KOR)	Kim Gi-jung and Kim Sa-rang (KOR)
2014 Incheon	Mohammad Ahsan and Hendra Setiawan (INA)	Lee Yong-dae and Yoo Yeon-seong (KOR)	Goh V Shem and Tan Wee Kiong (MAS)
2018 Jakarta–Palembang	Marcus Fernaldi Gideon and Kevin Sanjaya Sukamuljo (INA)	Fajar Alfian and Muhammad Rian Ardianto (INA)	Li Junhui and Liu Yuchen (CHN)
2018 Jakarta–Palembang	Marcus Fernaldi Gideon and Kevin Sanjaya Sukamuljo (INA)	Fajar Alfian and Muhammad Rian Ardianto (INA)	Lee Jhe-huei and Lee Yang (TPE)
2022 Hangzhou	Satwiksairaj Rankireddy and Chirag Shetty (IND)	Choi Sol-gyu and Kim Won-ho (KOR)	Lee Yang and Wang Chi-lin (TPE)
2022 Hangzhou	Satwiksairaj Rankireddy and Chirag Shetty (IND)	Choi Sol-gyu and Kim Won-ho (KOR)	Aaron Chia and Soh Wooi Yik (MAS)
2026 Aichi–Nagoya	Indonesia; Leo Rolly Carnando; Daniel Marthin	China; Liang Weikeng; Wang Chang	Kim Won-ho and Seo Seung-jae (KOR)
2026 Aichi–Nagoya	Indonesia; Leo Rolly Carnando; Daniel Marthin	China; Liang Weikeng; Wang Chang	Fajar Alfian and Muhammad Shohibul Fikri (INA)

== Men's team ==
Games	Gold	Silver	Bronze
1962 Jakarta	Indonesia (INA); Tutang Djamaluddin; Liem Tjeng Kiang; Ferry Sonneville; Tan Joe Hok; Abdul Patah Unang	Thailand (THA); Narong Bhornchima; Raphi Kanchanaraphi; Channarong Ratanaseangsuang; Sangob Rattanusorn; Charoen Wattanasin	Malaya (MAL); Billy Ng; Ng Boon Bee; Tan Yee Khan; Teh Kew San; Yew Cheng Hoe
1966 Bangkok	Thailand (THA); Chavalert Chumkum; Narong Bhornchima; Raphi Kanchanaraphi; Channarong Ratanaseangsuang; Sangob Rattanusorn; Tuly Ulao; Charoen Wattanasin	Malaysia (MAL); Eddy Choong; Khor Cheng Chye; Billy Ng; Ng Boon Bee; Tan Yee Khan; Teh Kew San; Yew Cheng Hoe	Japan (JPN); Masao Akiyama; Ippei Kojima; Takeshi Miyanaga; Eiichi Sakai
1966 Bangkok	Thailand (THA); Chavalert Chumkum; Narong Bhornchima; Raphi Kanchanaraphi; Channarong Ratanaseangsuang; Sangob Rattanusorn; Tuly Ulao; Charoen Wattanasin	Malaysia (MAL); Eddy Choong; Khor Cheng Chye; Billy Ng; Ng Boon Bee; Tan Yee Khan; Teh Kew San; Yew Cheng Hoe	Republic of China (ROC); Ho Wen-king; Lim Chien-jien; Lim Kheng-tee; Wong Liang-un
1970 Bangkok	Indonesia (INA); Indra Gunawan; Rudy Hartono; Indratno; Mintarja; Muljadi	Thailand (THA); Soonchai Akyapisut; Chavalert Chumkum; Bandid Jaiyen; Sangob Rattanusorn; Pornchai Sakuntaniyom; Tuly Ulao	Japan (JPN); Junji Honma; Ippei Kojima; Hiroshi Taniguch; Shoichi Toganoo
1970 Bangkok	Indonesia (INA); Indra Gunawan; Rudy Hartono; Indratno; Mintarja; Muljadi	Thailand (THA); Soonchai Akyapisut; Chavalert Chumkum; Bandid Jaiyen; Sangob Rattanusorn; Pornchai Sakuntaniyom; Tuly Ulao	Malaysia (MAL); Punch Gunalan; Lee Kok Peng; Abdul Rahman Mohamed; Ng Boon Bee; Ng Tat Wai; Tan Soon Hooi
1974 Tehran	China (CHN); Chen Tianxiang; Chen Xinhui; Fang Kaixiang; Hou Jiachang; Tang Xianhu; Yu Yaodong	Indonesia (INA); Ade Chandra; Christian Hadinata; Liem Swie King; Nunung Murdjianto; Tjun Tjun; Johan Wahjudi	India (IND); Davinder Ahuja; Partho Ganguli; Raman Ghosh; Dinesh Khanna; Prakash Padukone
1978 Bangkok	Indonesia (INA); Ade Chandra; Christian Hadinata; Rudy Heryanto; Hariamanto Kartono; Liem Swie King; Iie Sumirat	China (CHN); Han Jian; Hou Jiachang; Lin Shiquan; Luan Jin; Tang Xianhu; Yu Yaodong	Pakistan (PAK); Javed Iqbal; Zahid Maqbool; Hassan Shaheed; Tariq Wadood
1978 Bangkok	Indonesia (INA); Ade Chandra; Christian Hadinata; Rudy Heryanto; Hariamanto Kartono; Liem Swie King; Iie Sumirat	China (CHN); Han Jian; Hou Jiachang; Lin Shiquan; Luan Jin; Tang Xianhu; Yu Yaodong	Thailand (THA); Sawei Chanseorasmee; Bandid Jaiyen; Pichai Kongsirithavorn; Udom Luangpetcharaporn; Sarit Pisudchaikul; Surapong Suharitdamrong
1982 New Delhi	China (CHN); Chen Changjie; Han Jian; Lin Jiangli; Luan Jin; Sun Zhian; Yao Ximing	Indonesia (INA); Christian Hadinata; Wirawan Hadiyanto; Rudy Heryanto; Hariamanto Kartono; Liem Swie King; Icuk Sugiarto	India (IND); Leroy D'Sa; Pradeep Gandhe; Partho Ganguli; Syed Modi; Uday Pawar; Vikram Singh
1982 New Delhi	China (CHN); Chen Changjie; Han Jian; Lin Jiangli; Luan Jin; Sun Zhian; Yao Ximing	Indonesia (INA); Christian Hadinata; Wirawan Hadiyanto; Rudy Heryanto; Hariamanto Kartono; Liem Swie King; Icuk Sugiarto	South Korea (KOR); Choi Byung-hak; Kim Byung-sik; Lee Deuk-choon; Lee Eun-ku; Park Joo-bong; Sung Han-kook
1986 Seoul	South Korea (KOR); Choi Byung-hak; Kim Chang-kook; Kim Joong-soo; Kim Moon-soo; Lee Deuk-choon; Park Joo-bong; Park Sung-bae; Sung Han-kook	China (CHN); Chen Kang; Ding Qiqing; Jiang Guoliang; Li Yongbo; Tian Bingyi; Xiong Guobao; Yang Yang; Zhao Jianhua	Indonesia (INA); Bobby Ertanto; Christian Hadinata; Eddy Hartono; Eddy Kurniawan; Liem Swie King; Lius Pongoh; Icuk Sugiarto; Hadibowo Susanto
1986 Seoul	South Korea (KOR); Choi Byung-hak; Kim Chang-kook; Kim Joong-soo; Kim Moon-soo; Lee Deuk-choon; Park Joo-bong; Park Sung-bae; Sung Han-kook	China (CHN); Chen Kang; Ding Qiqing; Jiang Guoliang; Li Yongbo; Tian Bingyi; Xiong Guobao; Yang Yang; Zhao Jianhua	India (IND); Leroy D'Sa; U. Vimal Kumar; Ravi Kunte; Sanat Misra; Syed Modi; Prakash Padukone; Uday Pawar
1990 Beijing	China (CHN); Huang Zhanzhong; Li Yongbo; Tian Bingyi; Wu Wenkai; Xiong Guobao; Yang Yang; Zhao Jianhua; Zheng Yumin	Malaysia (MAL); Cheah Soon Kit; Foo Kok Keong; Kwan Yoke Meng; Jalani Sidek; Rashid Sidek; Razif Sidek; Soo Beng Kiang	Indonesia (INA); Alan Budikusuma; Rudy Gunawan; Eddy Hartono; Richard Mainaky; Aryono Miranat; Joko Suprianto; Hermawan Susanto; Ardy Wiranata
1990 Beijing	China (CHN); Huang Zhanzhong; Li Yongbo; Tian Bingyi; Wu Wenkai; Xiong Guobao; Yang Yang; Zhao Jianhua; Zheng Yumin	Malaysia (MAL); Cheah Soon Kit; Foo Kok Keong; Kwan Yoke Meng; Jalani Sidek; Rashid Sidek; Razif Sidek; Soo Beng Kiang	South Korea (KOR); Ahn Jae-chang; Choi Sang-bum; Kim Hak-kyun; Kim Moon-soo; Lee Kwang-jin; Park Joo-bong; Shon Jin-hwan; Sung Han-kook
1994 Hiroshima	Indonesia (INA); Hariyanto Arbi; Rudy Gunawan; Rexy Mainaky; Ricky Subagja; Bambang Suprianto; Joko Suprianto; Hermawan Susanto; Ardy Wiranata	South Korea (KOR); Ahn Jae-chang; Ha Tae-kwon; Kang Kyung-jin; Kim Hak-kyun; Lee Kwang-jin; Lee Suk-ho; Park Sung-woo; Yoo Yong-sung	China (CHN); Chen Hongyong; Chen Kang; Chen Xingdong; Dong Jiong; Huang Zhanzhong; Jiang Xin; Lin Liwen; Liu Jianjun
1994 Hiroshima	Indonesia (INA); Hariyanto Arbi; Rudy Gunawan; Rexy Mainaky; Ricky Subagja; Bambang Suprianto; Joko Suprianto; Hermawan Susanto; Ardy Wiranata	South Korea (KOR); Ahn Jae-chang; Ha Tae-kwon; Kang Kyung-jin; Kim Hak-kyun; Lee Kwang-jin; Lee Suk-ho; Park Sung-woo; Yoo Yong-sung	Malaysia (MAS); Cheah Soon Kit; Muralidesan Krishnamurthy; Ong Ewe Hock; Pang Chen; Soo Beng Kiang; Tan Kim Her; Yap Kim Hock
1998 Bangkok	Indonesia (INA); Tony Gunawan; Hendrawan; Taufik Hidayat; Tri Kusharjanto; Rexy Mainaky; Budi Santoso; Ricky Subagja; Candra Wijaya	China (CHN); Chen Gang; Dong Jiong; Liu Yong; Luo Yigang; Sun Jun; Yu Jinhao; Zhang Jun; Zhang Wei	South Korea (KOR); Ahn Jae-chang; Ha Tae-kwon; Hwang Sun-ho; Kang Kyung-jin; Kim Dong-moon; Lee Dong-soo; Park Sung-woo; Yoo Yong-sung
1998 Bangkok	Indonesia (INA); Tony Gunawan; Hendrawan; Taufik Hidayat; Tri Kusharjanto; Rexy Mainaky; Budi Santoso; Ricky Subagja; Candra Wijaya	China (CHN); Chen Gang; Dong Jiong; Liu Yong; Luo Yigang; Sun Jun; Yu Jinhao; Zhang Jun; Zhang Wei	Malaysia (MAS); Chan Chong Ming; Cheah Soon Thoe; James Chua; Jeremy Gan; Roslin Hashim; Pang Cheh Chang; Wong Choong Hann; Yong Hock Kin
2002 Busan	South Korea (KOR); Ha Tae-kwon; Jang Young-soo; Kim Dong-moon; Lee Dong-soo; Lee Hyun-il; Lee Jae-jin; Park Tae-sang; Shon Seung-mo; Yim Bang-eun; Yoo Yong-sung	Indonesia (INA); Rony Agustinus; Sigit Budiarto; Halim Haryanto; Hendrawan; Taufik Hidayat; Tri Kusharjanto; Marleve Mainaky; Bambang Suprianto; Nova Widianto; Candra Wijaya	China (CHN); Bao Chunlai; Chen Hong; Chen Qiqiu; Lin Dan; Liu Yong; Wang Wei; Xia Xuanze; Zhang Jun; Zhang Wei
2002 Busan	South Korea (KOR); Ha Tae-kwon; Jang Young-soo; Kim Dong-moon; Lee Dong-soo; Lee Hyun-il; Lee Jae-jin; Park Tae-sang; Shon Seung-mo; Yim Bang-eun; Yoo Yong-sung	Indonesia (INA); Rony Agustinus; Sigit Budiarto; Halim Haryanto; Hendrawan; Taufik Hidayat; Tri Kusharjanto; Marleve Mainaky; Bambang Suprianto; Nova Widianto; Candra Wijaya	Malaysia (MAS); Mohd Zakry Abdul Latif; Chan Chong Ming; Chang Kim Wai; Chew Choon Eng; Choong Tan Fook; James Chua; Mohd Hafiz Hashim; Lee Tsuen Seng; Ong Ewe Hock; Wong Choong Hann
2006 Doha	China (CHN); Bao Chunlai; Cai Yun; Chen Jin; Fu Haifeng; Guo Zhendong; Lin Dan; Xie Zhongbo; Zheng Bo	South Korea (KOR); Hwang Ji-man; Hwang Jung-woon; Jung Jae-sung; Lee Hyun-il; Lee Jae-jin; Lee Yong-dae; Park Sung-hwan; Shon Seung-mo	Indonesia (INA); Luluk Hadiyanto; Taufik Hidayat; Markis Kido; Sony Dwi Kuncoro; Simon Santoso; Hendra Setiawan; Nova Widianto; Alvent Yulianto
2006 Doha	China (CHN); Bao Chunlai; Cai Yun; Chen Jin; Fu Haifeng; Guo Zhendong; Lin Dan; Xie Zhongbo; Zheng Bo	South Korea (KOR); Hwang Ji-man; Hwang Jung-woon; Jung Jae-sung; Lee Hyun-il; Lee Jae-jin; Lee Yong-dae; Park Sung-hwan; Shon Seung-mo	Malaysia (MAS); Mohd Hafiz Hashim; Koo Kien Keat; Kuan Beng Hong; Lee Chong Wei; Lin Woon Fui; Tan Boon Heong; Mohd Fairuzizuan Tazari; Wong Choong Hann
2010 Guangzhou	China (CHN); Bao Chunlai; Cai Yun; Chen Jin; Chen Long; Fu Haifeng; Guo Zhendong; He Hanbin; Lin Dan; Xu Chen; Zhang Nan	South Korea (KOR); Hong Ji-hoon; Jung Jae-sung; Kim Gi-jung; Ko Sung-hyun; Lee Hyun-il; Lee Yong-dae; Park Sung-hwan; Shin Baek-cheol; Son Wan-ho; Yoo Yeon-seong	Indonesia (INA); Tontowi Ahmad; Mohammad Ahsan; Taufik Hidayat; Markis Kido; Sony Dwi Kuncoro; Fran Kurniawan; Dionysius Hayom Rumbaka; Simon Santoso; Hendra Setiawan; Alvent Yulianto
2010 Guangzhou	China (CHN); Bao Chunlai; Cai Yun; Chen Jin; Chen Long; Fu Haifeng; Guo Zhendong; He Hanbin; Lin Dan; Xu Chen; Zhang Nan	South Korea (KOR); Hong Ji-hoon; Jung Jae-sung; Kim Gi-jung; Ko Sung-hyun; Lee Hyun-il; Lee Yong-dae; Park Sung-hwan; Shin Baek-cheol; Son Wan-ho; Yoo Yeon-seong	Thailand (THA); Songphon Anugritayawon; Suppanyu Avihingsanon; Pollawat Boonpan; Bodin Isara; Maneepong Jongjit; Thitipong Lapho; Boonsak Ponsana; Sudket Prapakamol; Tanongsak Saensomboonsuk; Pakkawat Vilailak
2014 Incheon	South Korea (KOR); Jeon Hyeok-jin; Kim Gi-jung; Kim Sa-rang; Ko Sung-hyun; Lee Dong-keun; Lee Hyun-il; Lee Yong-dae; Shin Baek-cheol; Son Wan-ho; Yoo Yeon-seong	China (CHN); Cai Yun; Chen Long; Fu Haifeng; Gao Huan; Lin Dan; Liu Xiaolong; Qiu Zihan; Tian Houwei; Xu Chen; Zhang Nan	Malaysia (MAS); Chan Peng Soon; Chong Wei Feng; Goh Soon Huat; Goh V Shem; Hoon Thien How; Lee Chong Wei; Lim Khim Wah; Tan Boon Heong; Tan Wee Kiong; Iskandar Zulkarnain Zainuddin
2014 Incheon	South Korea (KOR); Jeon Hyeok-jin; Kim Gi-jung; Kim Sa-rang; Ko Sung-hyun; Lee Dong-keun; Lee Hyun-il; Lee Yong-dae; Shin Baek-cheol; Son Wan-ho; Yoo Yeon-seong	China (CHN); Cai Yun; Chen Long; Fu Haifeng; Gao Huan; Lin Dan; Liu Xiaolong; Qiu Zihan; Tian Houwei; Xu Chen; Zhang Nan	Chinese Taipei (TPE); Chen Hung-ling; Chou Tien-chen; Hsu Jen-hao; Hsueh Hsuan-yi; Lee Sheng-mu; Liang Jui-wei; Liao Kuan-hao; Liao Min-chun; Tsai Chia-hsin; Tseng Min-hao
2018 Jakarta–Palembang	China (CHN); Chen Long; Li Junhui; Lin Dan; Liu Cheng; Liu Yuchen; Qiao Bin; Shi Yuqi; Wang Yilü; Zhang Nan; Zheng Siwei	Indonesia (INA); Tontowi Ahmad; Mohammad Ahsan; Fajar Alfian; Muhammad Rian Ardianto; Jonatan Christie; Marcus Fernaldi Gideon; Anthony Sinisuka Ginting; Ihsan Maulana Mustofa; Kevin Sanjaya Sukamuljo; Ricky Karanda Suwardi	Japan (JPN); Takuro Hoki; Takuto Inoue; Takeshi Kamura; Yuki Kaneko; Kento Momota; Kenta Nishimoto; Keigo Sonoda; Riichi Takeshita; Kanta Tsuneyama; Yuta Watanabe
2018 Jakarta–Palembang	China (CHN); Chen Long; Li Junhui; Lin Dan; Liu Cheng; Liu Yuchen; Qiao Bin; Shi Yuqi; Wang Yilü; Zhang Nan; Zheng Siwei	Indonesia (INA); Tontowi Ahmad; Mohammad Ahsan; Fajar Alfian; Muhammad Rian Ardianto; Jonatan Christie; Marcus Fernaldi Gideon; Anthony Sinisuka Ginting; Ihsan Maulana Mustofa; Kevin Sanjaya Sukamuljo; Ricky Karanda Suwardi	Chinese Taipei (TPE); Chen Hung-ling; Chou Tien-chen; Hsu Jen-hao; Lee Jhe-huei; Lee Yang; Lu Ching-yao; Wang Chi-lin; Wang Tzu-wei; Yang Chih-chieh; Yang Po-han
2022 Hangzhou	China (CHN); Shi Yuqi; Li Shifeng; Lu Guangzu; Weng Hongyang; Liang Weikeng; Wang Chang; Liu Yuchen; Ou Xuanyi; Feng Yanzhe; Zheng Siwei	India (IND); Prannoy H. S. Lakshya Sen; Srikanth Kidambi; Mithun Manjunath; Satwiksairaj Rankireddy; Chirag Shetty; Arjun M. R. Dhruv Kapila; Rohan Kapoor; Sai Pratheek K.	South Korea (KOR); Seo Seung-jae; Lee Yun-gyu; Kim Won-ho; Kim Young-hyuk; Kang Min-hyuk; Jeon Hyeok-jin; Jin Yong; Cho Geon-yeop; Choi Sol-gyu; Na Sung-seung
2022 Hangzhou	China (CHN); Shi Yuqi; Li Shifeng; Lu Guangzu; Weng Hongyang; Liang Weikeng; Wang Chang; Liu Yuchen; Ou Xuanyi; Feng Yanzhe; Zheng Siwei	India (IND); Prannoy H. S. Lakshya Sen; Srikanth Kidambi; Mithun Manjunath; Satwiksairaj Rankireddy; Chirag Shetty; Arjun M. R. Dhruv Kapila; Rohan Kapoor; Sai Pratheek K.	Japan (JPN); Kyohei Yamashita; Yuta Watanabe; Kodai Naraoka; Akira Koga; Takuro Hoki; Taichi Saito; Kenta Nishimoto; Yugo Kobayashi; Kanta Tsuneyama; Koki Watanabe
2026 Aichi–Nagoya	Indonesia (INA); Fajar Alfian; Jonatan Christie; Alwi Farhan; Muhammad Shohibul Fikri; Nikolaus Joaquin; Daniel Marthin; Leo Rolly Carnando; Amri Syahnawi; Zaki Ubaidillah; Muhamad Yusuf	China (CHN); Feng Yanzhe; He Jiting; Jiang Zhenbang; Li Shifeng; Liang Weikeng; Liu Yi; Lu Guangzu; Shi Yuqi; Wang Chang; Weng Hongyang	Thailand (THA); Puritat Arree; Chaloempon Charoenkitamorn; Ruttanapak Oupthong; Dechapol Puavaranukroh; Peeratchai Sukphun; Pakkapon Teeraratsakul; Panitchaphon Teeraratsakul; Worrapol Thongsa-nga; Kunlavut Vitidsarn; Tanawat Yimjit
2026 Aichi–Nagoya	Indonesia (INA); Fajar Alfian; Jonatan Christie; Alwi Farhan; Muhammad Shohibul Fikri; Nikolaus Joaquin; Daniel Marthin; Leo Rolly Carnando; Amri Syahnawi; Zaki Ubaidillah; Muhamad Yusuf	China (CHN); Feng Yanzhe; He Jiting; Jiang Zhenbang; Li Shifeng; Liang Weikeng; Liu Yi; Lu Guangzu; Shi Yuqi; Wang Chang; Weng Hongyang	India (IND); Hariharan Amsakarunan; Prannoy H. S. Dhruv Kapila; Srikanth Kidambi; Arjun M. R. Tharun Mannepalli; Satwiksairaj Rankireddy; Lakshya Sen; Ayush Shetty; Chirag Shetty

== Women's singles ==
Games	Gold	Silver	Bronze
1962 Jakarta	Minarni (INA)	Corry Kawilarang (INA)	Happy Herowati (INA)
1966 Bangkok	Noriko Takagi (JPN)	Sumol Chanklum (THA)	Minarni (INA)
1966 Bangkok	Noriko Takagi (JPN)	Sumol Chanklum (THA)	Tomoko Takahashi (JPN)
1970 Bangkok	Hiroe Yuki (JPN)	Thongkam Kingmanee (THA)	Minarni (INA)
1970 Bangkok	Hiroe Yuki (JPN)	Thongkam Kingmanee (THA)	Sylvia Ng (MAL)
1974 Tehran	Chen Yuniang (CHN)	Liang Qiuxia (CHN)	Hiroe Yuki (JPN)
1978 Bangkok	Liang Qiuxia (CHN)	Liu Xia (CHN)	Saori Kondo (JPN)
1978 Bangkok	Liang Qiuxia (CHN)	Liu Xia (CHN)	Sirisriro Patama (THA)
1982 New Delhi	Zhang Ailing (CHN)	Li Lingwei (CHN)	Sumiko Kitada (JPN)
1982 New Delhi	Zhang Ailing (CHN)	Li Lingwei (CHN)	Kim Yun-ja (KOR)
1986 Seoul	Han Aiping (CHN)	Li Lingwei (CHN)	Hwang Hye-young (KOR)
1986 Seoul	Han Aiping (CHN)	Li Lingwei (CHN)	Kim Yun-ja (KOR)
1990 Beijing	Tang Jiuhong (CHN)	Lee Young-suk (KOR)	Huang Hua (CHN)
1990 Beijing	Tang Jiuhong (CHN)	Lee Young-suk (KOR)	Susi Susanti (INA)
1994 Hiroshima	Bang Soo-hyun (KOR)	Hisako Mizui (JPN)	Ye Zhaoying (CHN)
1994 Hiroshima	Bang Soo-hyun (KOR)	Hisako Mizui (JPN)	Susi Susanti (INA)
1998 Bangkok	Kanako Yonekura (JPN)	Gong Zhichao (CHN)	Lee Joo-hyun (KOR)
1998 Bangkok	Kanako Yonekura (JPN)	Gong Zhichao (CHN)	Sujitra Ekmongkolpaisarn (THA)
2002 Busan	Zhou Mi (CHN)	Gong Ruina (CHN)	Wang Chen (HKG)
2002 Busan	Zhou Mi (CHN)	Gong Ruina (CHN)	Kim Kyeung-ran (KOR)
2006 Doha	Wang Chen (HKG)	Yip Pui Yin (HKG)	Xie Xingfang (CHN)
2006 Doha	Wang Chen (HKG)	Yip Pui Yin (HKG)	Hwang Hye-youn (KOR)
2010 Guangzhou	Wang Shixian (CHN)	Wang Xin (CHN)	Yip Pui Yin (HKG)
2010 Guangzhou	Wang Shixian (CHN)	Wang Xin (CHN)	Eriko Hirose (JPN)
2014 Incheon	Wang Yihan (CHN)	Li Xuerui (CHN)	Bae Yeon-ju (KOR)
2014 Incheon	Wang Yihan (CHN)	Li Xuerui (CHN)	Tai Tzu-ying (TPE)
2018 Jakarta–Palembang	Tai Tzu-ying (TPE)	P. V. Sindhu (IND)	Saina Nehwal (IND)
2018 Jakarta–Palembang	Tai Tzu-ying (TPE)	P. V. Sindhu (IND)	Akane Yamaguchi (JPN)
2022 Hangzhou	An Se-young (KOR)	Chen Yufei (CHN)	He Bingjiao (CHN)
2022 Hangzhou	An Se-young (KOR)	Chen Yufei (CHN)	Aya Ohori (JPN)
2026 Aichi–Nagoya	An Se-young (KOR)	Akane Yamaguchi (JPN)	Chen Yufei (CHN)
2026 Aichi–Nagoya	An Se-young (KOR)	Akane Yamaguchi (JPN)	Wang Zhiyi (CHN)

== Women's doubles ==
Games	Gold	Silver	Bronze
1962 Jakarta	Minarni and Retno Kustijah (INA)	Corry Kawilarang and Happy Herowati (INA)	Tan Gaik Bee and Ng Mei Ling (MAL)
1966 Bangkok	Minarni and Retno Kustijah (INA)	Hiroe Amano and Tomoko Takahashi (JPN)	Noriko Takagi and Kazuko Goto (JPN)
1966 Bangkok	Minarni and Retno Kustijah (INA)	Hiroe Amano and Tomoko Takahashi (JPN)	Pratuang Pattabongs and Achara Pattabongs (THA)
1970 Bangkok	Etsuko Takenaka and Machiko Aizawa (JPN)	Retno Kustijah and Nurhaena (INA)	Rosalind Singha Ang and Teoh Siew Yong (MAL)
1970 Bangkok	Etsuko Takenaka and Machiko Aizawa (JPN)	Retno Kustijah and Nurhaena (INA)	Sumol Chanklum and Achara Pattabongs (THA)
1974 Tehran	Liang Qiuxia and Zheng Huiming (CHN)	Lin Youya and Qiu Yufang (CHN)	Theresia Widiastuti and Imelda Wiguna (INA)
1978 Bangkok	Verawaty Wiharjo and Imelda Wiguna (INA)	Qiu Yufang and Zheng Huiming (CHN)	Theresia Widiastuti and Ruth Damayanti (INA)
1978 Bangkok	Verawaty Wiharjo and Imelda Wiguna (INA)	Qiu Yufang and Zheng Huiming (CHN)	Sirisriro Patama and Thongkam Kingmanee (THA)
1982 New Delhi	Hwang Sun-ai and Kang Haeng-suk (KOR)	Kim Yun-ja and Yoo Sang-hee (KOR)	Wu Dixi and Lin Ying (CHN)
1982 New Delhi	Hwang Sun-ai and Kang Haeng-suk (KOR)	Kim Yun-ja and Yoo Sang-hee (KOR)	Atsuko Tokuda and Yoshiko Yonekura (JPN)
1986 Seoul	Lin Ying and Guan Weizhen (CHN)	Kim Yun-ja and Yoo Sang-hee (KOR)	Rosiana Tendean and Imelda Wiguna (INA)
1986 Seoul	Lin Ying and Guan Weizhen (CHN)	Kim Yun-ja and Yoo Sang-hee (KOR)	Kimiko Jinnai and Sumiko Kitada (JPN)
1990 Beijing	Guan Weizhen and Nong Qunhua (CHN)	Chung So-young and Gil Young-ah (KOR)	Yao Fen and Lai Caiqin (CHN)
1990 Beijing	Guan Weizhen and Nong Qunhua (CHN)	Chung So-young and Gil Young-ah (KOR)	Verawaty Fadjrin and Lili Tampi (INA)
1994 Hiroshima	Shim Eun-jung and Jang Hye-ock (KOR)	Chung So-young and Gil Young-ah (KOR)	Ge Fei and Gu Jun (CHN)
1994 Hiroshima	Shim Eun-jung and Jang Hye-ock (KOR)	Chung So-young and Gil Young-ah (KOR)	Tomomi Matsuo and Kyoko Sasage (JPN)
1998 Bangkok	Ge Fei and Gu Jun (CHN)	Eliza Nathanael and Deyana Lomban (INA)	Qin Yiyuan and Tang Hetian (CHN)
1998 Bangkok	Ge Fei and Gu Jun (CHN)	Eliza Nathanael and Deyana Lomban (INA)	Ra Kyung-min and Chung Jae-hee (KOR)
2002 Busan	Ra Kyung-min and Lee Kyung-won (KOR)	Gao Ling and Huang Sui (CHN)	Yang Wei and Huang Nanyan (CHN)
2002 Busan	Ra Kyung-min and Lee Kyung-won (KOR)	Gao Ling and Huang Sui (CHN)	Lee Hyo-jung and Hwang Yu-mi (KOR)
2006 Doha	Gao Ling and Huang Sui (CHN)	Zhang Jiewen and Yang Wei (CHN)	Kumiko Ogura and Reiko Shiota (JPN)
2006 Doha	Gao Ling and Huang Sui (CHN)	Zhang Jiewen and Yang Wei (CHN)	Lee Kyung-won and Lee Hyo-jung (KOR)
2010 Guangzhou	Tian Qing and Zhao Yunlei (CHN)	Wang Xiaoli and Yu Yang (CHN)	Ha Jung-eun and Lee Kyung-won (KOR)
2010 Guangzhou	Tian Qing and Zhao Yunlei (CHN)	Wang Xiaoli and Yu Yang (CHN)	Kim Min-jung and Lee Hyo-jung (KOR)
2014 Incheon	Nitya Krishinda Maheswari and Greysia Polii (INA)	Misaki Matsutomo and Ayaka Takahashi (JPN)	Tian Qing and Zhao Yunlei (CHN)
2014 Incheon	Nitya Krishinda Maheswari and Greysia Polii (INA)	Misaki Matsutomo and Ayaka Takahashi (JPN)	Vivian Hoo and Woon Khe Wei (MAS)
2018 Jakarta–Palembang	Chen Qingchen and Jia Yifan (CHN)	Misaki Matsutomo and Ayaka Takahashi (JPN)	Greysia Polii and Apriyani Rahayu (INA)
2018 Jakarta–Palembang	Chen Qingchen and Jia Yifan (CHN)	Misaki Matsutomo and Ayaka Takahashi (JPN)	Yuki Fukushima and Sayaka Hirota (JPN)
2022 Hangzhou	Chen Qingchen and Jia Yifan (CHN)	Baek Ha-na and Lee So-hee (KOR)	Yuki Fukushima and Sayaka Hirota (JPN)
2022 Hangzhou	Chen Qingchen and Jia Yifan (CHN)	Baek Ha-na and Lee So-hee (KOR)	Kim So-yeong and Kong Hee-yong (KOR)
2026 Aichi–Nagoya	Baek Ha-na and Lee So-hee (KOR)	Liu Shengshu and Tan Ning (CHN)	Pearly Tan and Thinaah Muralitharan (MAS)
2026 Aichi–Nagoya	Baek Ha-na and Lee So-hee (KOR)	Liu Shengshu and Tan Ning (CHN)	Rin Uesaka and Kie Nakanishi (JPN)

== Women's team ==
Games	Gold	Silver	Bronze
1962 Jakarta	Indonesia (INA); Goei Kiok Nio; Happy Herowati; Corry Kawilarang; Retno Kustijah; Minarni	Malaya (MAL); Annie Keong; Kok Lee Ying; Jean Moey; Ng Mei Ling; Tan Gaik Bee	Thailand (THA); Sumol Chanklum; Boobpa Kaentong; Prathin Pattabongs; Pratuang Pattabongs
1966 Bangkok	Japan (JPN); Hiroe Amano; Kazuko Goto; Noriko Takagi; Tomoko Takahashi	Thailand (THA); Sumol Chanklum; Boobpa Kaentong; Achara Pattabongs; Pratuang Pattabongs	Indonesia (INA); Retno Kustijah; Minarni; Nurhaena; Tan Tjoen Ing
1966 Bangkok	Japan (JPN); Hiroe Amano; Kazuko Goto; Noriko Takagi; Tomoko Takahashi	Thailand (THA); Sumol Chanklum; Boobpa Kaentong; Achara Pattabongs; Pratuang Pattabongs	South Korea (KOR); Kang Young-sin; Lee Young-soon
1970 Bangkok	Japan (JPN); Machiko Aizawa; Mariko Nishio; Etsuko Takenaka; Hiroe Yuki	Thailand (THA); Sumol Chanklum; Boobpa Kaentong; Thongkam Kingmanee; Petchroong Liengtrakulngam; Achara Pattabongs	Indonesia (INA); Utami Dewi Kurniawan; Retno Kustijah; Minarni; Nurhaena; Poppy Tumengkol; Theresia Widiastuti
1970 Bangkok	Japan (JPN); Machiko Aizawa; Mariko Nishio; Etsuko Takenaka; Hiroe Yuki	Thailand (THA); Sumol Chanklum; Boobpa Kaentong; Thongkam Kingmanee; Petchroong Liengtrakulngam; Achara Pattabongs	South Korea (KOR); Han Sook-ee; Joon Im-soon; Kang Young-sin; Kim Jong-ja
1974 Tehran	China (CHN); Chen Yuniang; Liang Qiuxia; Liu Xiaozheng; Lin Youya; Qiu Yufang; Zheng Huiming	Indonesia (INA); Regina Masli; Minarni; Taty Sumirah; Theresia Widiastuti; Imelda Wiguna; Sri Wiyanti	Japan (JPN); Machiko Aizawa; Mika Ikeda; Mariko Nishio; Etsuko Takenaka; Hiroe Yuki
1978 Bangkok	China (CHN); Li Fang; Liang Qiuxia; Liu Xia; Qiu Yufang; Zhang Ailing; Zheng Huiming	Indonesia (INA); Ruth Damayanti; Ivana Lie; Tjan So Gwan; Theresia Widiastuti; Imelda Wiguna; Verawaty Wiharjo	Japan (JPN); Saori Kondo; Mikiko Takada; Atsuko Tokuda; Emiko Ueno; Yoshiko Yonekura; Hiroe Yuki
1978 Bangkok	China (CHN); Li Fang; Liang Qiuxia; Liu Xia; Qiu Yufang; Zhang Ailing; Zheng Huiming	Indonesia (INA); Ruth Damayanti; Ivana Lie; Tjan So Gwan; Theresia Widiastuti; Imelda Wiguna; Verawaty Wiharjo	Thailand (THA); Porntip Buntanon; Suleeporn Jittariyakul; Thongkam Kingmanee; Petchroong Liengtrakulngam; Sirisriro Patama
1982 New Delhi	China (CHN); Li Lingwei; Lin Ying; Wu Dixi; Wu Jianqiu; Xu Rong; Zhang Ailing	Japan (JPN); Kimiko Jinnai; Sumiko Kitada; Kazuko Takamine; Fumiko Tokairin; Atsuko Tokuda; Yoshiko Yonekura	India (IND); Vandana Chiplunkar; Ami Ghia; Madhumita Goswami; Amita Kulkarni; Hufrish Nariman; Kanwal Thakar Singh
1982 New Delhi	China (CHN); Li Lingwei; Lin Ying; Wu Dixi; Wu Jianqiu; Xu Rong; Zhang Ailing	Japan (JPN); Kimiko Jinnai; Sumiko Kitada; Kazuko Takamine; Fumiko Tokairin; Atsuko Tokuda; Yoshiko Yonekura	South Korea (KOR); Hwang Sun-ai; Kang Haeng-suk; Kim Yun-ja; Song Eun-joo; Yoo Sang-hee
1986 Seoul	China (CHN); Gu Jiaming; Guan Weizhen; Han Aiping; Li Lingwei; Lin Ying; Qian Ping; Wu Jianqiu; Zheng Yuli	Japan (JPN); Kimiko Jinnai; Sumiko Kitada; Harumi Kohara; Hisako Takamine; Atsuko Tokuda; Yoshiko Yonekura	Indonesia (INA); Verawaty Fadjrin; Sarwendah Kusumawardhani; Elizabeth Latief; Ivana Lie; Rosiana Tendean; Imelda Wiguna
1986 Seoul	China (CHN); Gu Jiaming; Guan Weizhen; Han Aiping; Li Lingwei; Lin Ying; Qian Ping; Wu Jianqiu; Zheng Yuli	Japan (JPN); Kimiko Jinnai; Sumiko Kitada; Harumi Kohara; Hisako Takamine; Atsuko Tokuda; Yoshiko Yonekura	South Korea (KOR); Chung Myung-hee; Chung So-young; Hwang Hye-young; Kang Haeng-suk; Kim Ho-ja; Kim Yun-ja; Lee Myung-hee; Yoo Sang-hee
1990 Beijing	China (CHN); Guan Weizhen; Huang Hua; Lai Caiqin; Nong Qunhua; Shi Fangjing; Tang Jiuhong; Yao Fen; Zhou Lei	Indonesia (INA); Verawaty Fadjrin; Sarwendah Kusumawardhani; Lilik Sudarwati; Erma Sulistianingsih; Susi Susanti; Lili Tampi; Rosiana Tendean; Minarti Timur	Japan (JPN); Kimiko Jinnai; Kazue Kanai; Tomomi Matsuo; Aiko Miyamura; Hisako Mizui; Hisako Mori; Kyoko Sasage
1990 Beijing	China (CHN); Guan Weizhen; Huang Hua; Lai Caiqin; Nong Qunhua; Shi Fangjing; Tang Jiuhong; Yao Fen; Zhou Lei	Indonesia (INA); Verawaty Fadjrin; Sarwendah Kusumawardhani; Lilik Sudarwati; Erma Sulistianingsih; Susi Susanti; Lili Tampi; Rosiana Tendean; Minarti Timur	South Korea (KOR); Chung Myung-hee; Chung So-young; Gil Young-ah; Hwang Hye-young; Lee Heung-soon; Lee Jung-mi; Lee Young-suk; Shim Eun-jung
1994 Hiroshima	South Korea (KOR); Bang Soo-hyun; Chung So-young; Gil Young-ah; Jang Hye-ock; Kim Ji-hyun; Lee Heung-soon; Ra Kyung-min; Shim Eun-jung	Indonesia (INA); Finarsih; Yuni Kartika; Eliza Nathanael; Ika Heny Nursanti; Zelin Resiana; Yuliani Sentosa; Susi Susanti; Lili Tampi	China (CHN); Chen Ying; Ge Fei; Gu Jun; Han Jingna; Tang Jiuhong; Wu Yuhong; Yao Yan; Ye Zhaoying
1994 Hiroshima	South Korea (KOR); Bang Soo-hyun; Chung So-young; Gil Young-ah; Jang Hye-ock; Kim Ji-hyun; Lee Heung-soon; Ra Kyung-min; Shim Eun-jung	Indonesia (INA); Finarsih; Yuni Kartika; Eliza Nathanael; Ika Heny Nursanti; Zelin Resiana; Yuliani Sentosa; Susi Susanti; Lili Tampi	Japan (JPN); Tokiko Hirota; Takako Ida; Yuko Koike; Tomomi Matsuo; Aiko Miyamura; Hisako Mizui; Yasuko Mizui; Kyoko Sasage
1998 Bangkok	China (CHN); Dai Yun; Ge Fei; Gong Zhichao; Gu Jun; Qin Yiyuan; Tang Hetian; Ye Zhaoying; Zhang Ning	South Korea (KOR); Chung Jae-hee; Kim Ji-hyun; Kim Shin-young; Lee Joo-hyun; Lee Kyung-won; Lee Soon-deuk; Ra Kyung-min; Yim Kyung-jin	Indonesia (INA); Mia Audina; Carmelita; Indarti Issolina; Cindana Hartono Kusuma; Deyana Lomban; Meiluawati; Eliza Nathanael; Minarti Timur
1998 Bangkok	China (CHN); Dai Yun; Ge Fei; Gong Zhichao; Gu Jun; Qin Yiyuan; Tang Hetian; Ye Zhaoying; Zhang Ning	South Korea (KOR); Chung Jae-hee; Kim Ji-hyun; Kim Shin-young; Lee Joo-hyun; Lee Kyung-won; Lee Soon-deuk; Ra Kyung-min; Yim Kyung-jin	Japan (JPN); Takako Ida; Saori Ito; Yoshiko Iwata; Haruko Matsuda; Yasuko Mizui; Kanako Yonekura
2002 Busan	China (CHN); Dai Yun; Gao Ling; Gong Ruina; Huang Nanyan; Huang Sui; Wei Yili; Yang Wei; Zhang Jiewen; Zhang Ning; Zhou Mi	South Korea (KOR); Bae Seung-hee; Hwang Yu-mi; Jun Jae-youn; Kim Kyeung-ran; Kwon Hee-sook; Lee Hae-young; Lee Hyo-jung; Lee Kyung-won; Ra Kyung-min; Shin Ja-young	Hong Kong (HKG); Koon Wai Chee; Li Wing Mui; Ling Wan Ting; Siu Ching Man; Wang Chen
2002 Busan	China (CHN); Dai Yun; Gao Ling; Gong Ruina; Huang Nanyan; Huang Sui; Wei Yili; Yang Wei; Zhang Jiewen; Zhang Ning; Zhou Mi	South Korea (KOR); Bae Seung-hee; Hwang Yu-mi; Jun Jae-youn; Kim Kyeung-ran; Kwon Hee-sook; Lee Hae-young; Lee Hyo-jung; Lee Kyung-won; Ra Kyung-min; Shin Ja-young	Thailand (THA); Sathinee Chankrachangwong; Sujitra Ekmongkolpaisarn; Salakjit Ponsana; Saralee Thungthongkam
2006 Doha	China (CHN); Gao Ling; Huang Sui; Xie Xingfang; Yang Wei; Zhang Jiewen; Zhang Ning; Zhang Yawen; Zhu Lin	Japan (JPN); Eriko Hirose; Miyuki Maeda; Kaori Mori; Kumiko Ogura; Reiko Shiota; Satoko Suetsuna; Kanako Yonekura	South Korea (KOR); Ha Jung-eun; Hwang Hye-youn; Hwang Yu-mi; Jun Jae-youn; Lee Hyo-jung; Lee Hyun-jin; Lee Kyung-won; Lee Yun-hwa
2006 Doha	China (CHN); Gao Ling; Huang Sui; Xie Xingfang; Yang Wei; Zhang Jiewen; Zhang Ning; Zhang Yawen; Zhu Lin	Japan (JPN); Eriko Hirose; Miyuki Maeda; Kaori Mori; Kumiko Ogura; Reiko Shiota; Satoko Suetsuna; Kanako Yonekura	Singapore (SIN); Siti Noor Ashikin; Jiang Yanmei; Li Li; Li Yujia; Frances Liu; Vanessa Neo; Shinta Mulia Sari; Xing Aiying
2010 Guangzhou	China (CHN); Cheng Shu; Jiang Yanjiao; Lu Lan; Ma Jin; Tian Qing; Wang Shixian; Wang Xiaoli; Wang Xin; Yu Yang; Zhao Yunlei	Thailand (THA); Savitree Amitrapai; Duanganong Aroonkesorn; Porntip Buranaprasertsuk; Ratchanok Intanon; Nitchaon Jindapol; Punyada Munkitchokecharoen; Salakjit Ponsana; Sapsiree Taerattanachai; Saralee Thungthongkam; Kunchala Voravichitchaikul	Indonesia (INA); Pia Zebadiah Bernadet; Lindaweni Fanetri; Adriyanti Firdasari; Shendy Puspa Irawati; Meiliana Jauhari; Maria Febe Kusumastuti; Nitya Krishinda Maheswari; Liliyana Natsir; Greysia Polii; Aprilia Yuswandari
2010 Guangzhou	China (CHN); Cheng Shu; Jiang Yanjiao; Lu Lan; Ma Jin; Tian Qing; Wang Shixian; Wang Xiaoli; Wang Xin; Yu Yang; Zhao Yunlei	Thailand (THA); Savitree Amitrapai; Duanganong Aroonkesorn; Porntip Buranaprasertsuk; Ratchanok Intanon; Nitchaon Jindapol; Punyada Munkitchokecharoen; Salakjit Ponsana; Sapsiree Taerattanachai; Saralee Thungthongkam; Kunchala Voravichitchaikul	South Korea (KOR); Bae Seung-hee; Bae Yeon-ju; Chang Ye-na; Ha Jung-eun; Hwang Hye-youn; Kim Min-jung; Lee Hyo-jung; Lee Kyung-won; Sung Ji-hyun; Yoo Hyun-young
2014 Incheon	China (CHN); Bao Yixin; Li Xuerui; Liu Xin; Ma Jin; Tian Qing; Wang Shixian; Wang Xiaoli; Wang Yihan; Yu Yang; Zhao Yunlei	South Korea (KOR); Bae Yeon-ju; Chang Ye-na; Go Ah-ra; Jung Kyung-eun; Kim Ha-na; Kim Hyo-min; Kim So-yeong; Ko Eun-byul; Sung Ji-hyun; Yoo Hae-won	India (IND); Pradnya Gadre; Tanvi Lad; Saina Nehwal; Ashwini Ponnappa; N. Sikki Reddy; P. V. Sindhu; P. C. Thulasi
2014 Incheon	China (CHN); Bao Yixin; Li Xuerui; Liu Xin; Ma Jin; Tian Qing; Wang Shixian; Wang Xiaoli; Wang Yihan; Yu Yang; Zhao Yunlei	South Korea (KOR); Bae Yeon-ju; Chang Ye-na; Go Ah-ra; Jung Kyung-eun; Kim Ha-na; Kim Hyo-min; Kim So-yeong; Ko Eun-byul; Sung Ji-hyun; Yoo Hae-won	Japan (JPN); Yui Hashimoto; Reika Kakiiwa; Miyuki Maeda; Shizuka Matsuo; Misaki Matsutomo; Minatsu Mitani; Mami Naito; Ayaka Takahashi; Sayaka Takahashi; Akane Yamaguchi
2018 Jakarta–Palembang	Japan (JPN); Yuki Fukushima; Arisa Higashino; Sayaka Hirota; Misaki Matsutomo; Aya Ohori; Nozomi Okuhara; Sayaka Sato; Ayaka Takahashi; Akane Yamaguchi; Koharu Yonemoto	China (CHN); Cai Yanyan; Chen Qingchen; Chen Yufei; Gao Fangjie; He Bingjiao; Huang Dongping; Huang Yaqiong; Jia Yifan; Tang Jinhua; Zheng Yu	Indonesia (INA); Fitriani; Della Destiara Haris; Ruselli Hartawan; Ni Ketut Mahadewi Istarani; Liliyana Natsir; Greysia Polii; Rizki Amelia Pradipta; Apriyani Rahayu; Debby Susanto; Gregoria Mariska Tunjung
2018 Jakarta–Palembang	Japan (JPN); Yuki Fukushima; Arisa Higashino; Sayaka Hirota; Misaki Matsutomo; Aya Ohori; Nozomi Okuhara; Sayaka Sato; Ayaka Takahashi; Akane Yamaguchi; Koharu Yonemoto	China (CHN); Cai Yanyan; Chen Qingchen; Chen Yufei; Gao Fangjie; He Bingjiao; Huang Dongping; Huang Yaqiong; Jia Yifan; Tang Jinhua; Zheng Yu	Thailand (THA); Chayanit Chaladchalam; Pornpawee Chochuwong; Ratchanok Intanon; Nitchaon Jindapol; Jongkolphan Kititharakul; Phataimas Muenwong; Busanan Ongbamrungphan; Rawinda Prajongjai; Puttita Supajirakul; Sapsiree Taerattanachai
2022 Hangzhou	South Korea (KOR); An Se-young; Kim Ga-eun; Kim Ga-ram; Baek Ha-na; Lee So-hee; Kim So-yeong; Kong Hee-yong; Jeong Na-eun; Kim Hye-jeong; Chae Yoo-jung	China (CHN); Chen Yufei; He Bingjiao; Han Yue; Wang Zhiyi; Chen Qingchen; Jia Yifan; Zhang Shuxian; Zheng Yu; Huang Dongping; Huang Yaqiong	Japan (JPN); Akane Yamaguchi; Aya Ohori; Saena Kawakami; Natsuki Nidaira; Nami Matsuyama; Chiharu Shida; Yuki Fukushima; Sayaka Hirota; Arisa Higashino; Naru Shinoya
2022 Hangzhou	South Korea (KOR); An Se-young; Kim Ga-eun; Kim Ga-ram; Baek Ha-na; Lee So-hee; Kim So-yeong; Kong Hee-yong; Jeong Na-eun; Kim Hye-jeong; Chae Yoo-jung	China (CHN); Chen Yufei; He Bingjiao; Han Yue; Wang Zhiyi; Chen Qingchen; Jia Yifan; Zhang Shuxian; Zheng Yu; Huang Dongping; Huang Yaqiong	Thailand (THA); Supissara Paewsampran; Sapsiree Taerattanachai; Benyapa Aimsaard; Nuntakarn Aimsaard; Rawinda Prajongjai; Jongkolphan Kititharakul; Supanida Katethong; Busanan Ongbamrungphan; Pornpawee Chochuwong; Ratchanok Intanon
2026 Aichi–Nagoya	China (CHN); Chen Yufei; Han Qianxi; Han Yue; Huang Dongping; Jia Yifan; Liu Shengshu; Tan Ning; Wang Zhiyi; Wei Yaxin; Zhang Shuxian	Japan (JPN); Yuki Fukushima; Riko Gunji; Sayaka Hobara; Rin Uesaka; Mayu Matsumoto; Tomoka Miyazaki; Kie Nakanishi; Nozomi Okuhara; Maya Taguchi; Akane Yamaguchi	Indonesia (INA); Ni Kadek Dhinda Amartya Pratiwi; Febriana Dwipuji Kusuma; Nita Violina Marwah; Meilysa Trias Puspita Sari; Mutiara Ayu Puspitasari; Siti Fadia Silva Ramadhanti; Rachel Allessya Rose; Febi Setianingrum; Putri Kusuma Wardani; Thalita Ramadhani Wiryawan
2026 Aichi–Nagoya	China (CHN); Chen Yufei; Han Qianxi; Han Yue; Huang Dongping; Jia Yifan; Liu Shengshu; Tan Ning; Wang Zhiyi; Wei Yaxin; Zhang Shuxian	Japan (JPN); Yuki Fukushima; Riko Gunji; Sayaka Hobara; Rin Uesaka; Mayu Matsumoto; Tomoka Miyazaki; Kie Nakanishi; Nozomi Okuhara; Maya Taguchi; Akane Yamaguchi	South Korea (KOR); An Se-young; Baek Ha-na; Jang Ha-jeong; Jeong Na-eun; Kim Ga-eun; Kim Ga-ram; Kim Hye-jeong; Kong Hee-yong; Lee So-hee; Sim Yu-jin

== Mixed doubles ==
Games	Gold	Silver	Bronze
1966 Bangkok	Teh Kew San and Rosalind Singha Ang (MAL)	Eddy Choong and Tan Gaik Bee (MAL)	Tjoa Tjong Boan and Retno Kustijah (INA)
1966 Bangkok	Teh Kew San and Rosalind Singha Ang (MAL)	Eddy Choong and Tan Gaik Bee (MAL)	Wong Pek Sen and Minarni (INA)
1970 Bangkok	Ng Boon Bee and Sylvia Ng (MAL)	Bandid Jaiyen and Achara Pattabongs (THA)	Rudy Hartono and Minarni (INA)
1970 Bangkok	Ng Boon Bee and Sylvia Ng (MAL)	Bandid Jaiyen and Achara Pattabongs (THA)	Ippei Kojima and Etsuko Takenaka (JPN)
1974 Tehran	Christian Hadinata and Regina Masli (INA)	Tjun Tjun and Sri Wiyanti (INA)	Tang Xianhu and Chen Yuniang (CHN)
1978 Bangkok	Tang Xianhu and Zhang Ailing (CHN)	Hariamanto Kartono and Theresia Widiastuti (INA)	Yu Yaodong and Li Fang (CHN)
1978 Bangkok	Tang Xianhu and Zhang Ailing (CHN)	Hariamanto Kartono and Theresia Widiastuti (INA)	Christian Hadinata and Imelda Wiguna (INA)
1982 New Delhi	Christian Hadinata and Ivana Lie (INA)	Icuk Sugiarto and Ruth Damayanti (INA)	Lin Jiangli and Lin Ying (CHN)
1982 New Delhi	Christian Hadinata and Ivana Lie (INA)	Icuk Sugiarto and Ruth Damayanti (INA)	Leroy D'Sa and Kanwal Thakar Singh (IND)
1986 Seoul	Park Joo-bong and Chung Myung-hee (KOR)	Lee Deuk-choon and Chung So-young (KOR)	Jiang Guoliang and Lin Ying (CHN)
1986 Seoul	Park Joo-bong and Chung Myung-hee (KOR)	Lee Deuk-choon and Chung So-young (KOR)	Xiong Guobao and Qian Ping (CHN)
1990 Beijing	Park Joo-bong and Chung Myung-hee (KOR)	Eddy Hartono and Verawaty Fadjrin (INA)	Zheng Yumin and Shi Fangjing (CHN)
1990 Beijing	Park Joo-bong and Chung Myung-hee (KOR)	Eddy Hartono and Verawaty Fadjrin (INA)	Rudy Gunawan and Rosiana Tendean (INA)
1994 Hiroshima	Yoo Yong-sung and Chung So-young (KOR)	Kang Kyung-jin and Jang Hye-ock (KOR)	Rudy Gunawan and Eliza Nathanael (INA)
1994 Hiroshima	Yoo Yong-sung and Chung So-young (KOR)	Kang Kyung-jin and Jang Hye-ock (KOR)	Yap Kim Hock and Lee Wai Leng (MAS)
1998 Bangkok	Kim Dong-moon and Ra Kyung-min (KOR)	Lee Dong-soo and Yim Kyung-jin (KOR)	Zhang Jun and Qin Yiyuan (CHN)
1998 Bangkok	Kim Dong-moon and Ra Kyung-min (KOR)	Lee Dong-soo and Yim Kyung-jin (KOR)	Tri Kusharjanto and Minarti Timur (INA)
2002 Busan	Kim Dong-moon and Ra Kyung-min (KOR)	Khunakorn Sudhisodhi and Saralee Thungthongkam (THA)	Chen Qiqiu and Zhang Jiewen (CHN)
2002 Busan	Kim Dong-moon and Ra Kyung-min (KOR)	Khunakorn Sudhisodhi and Saralee Thungthongkam (THA)	Nova Widianto and Vita Marissa (INA)
2006 Doha	Zheng Bo and Gao Ling (CHN)	Xie Zhongbo and Zhang Yawen (CHN)	Mohd Fairuzizuan Tazari and Wong Pei Tty (MAS)
2006 Doha	Zheng Bo and Gao Ling (CHN)	Xie Zhongbo and Zhang Yawen (CHN)	Sudket Prapakamol and Saralee Thungthongkam (THA)
2010 Guangzhou	Shin Baek-cheol and Lee Hyo-jung (KOR)	Zhang Nan and Zhao Yunlei (CHN)	He Hanbin and Ma Jin (CHN)
2010 Guangzhou	Shin Baek-cheol and Lee Hyo-jung (KOR)	Zhang Nan and Zhao Yunlei (CHN)	Chen Hung-ling and Cheng Wen-hsing (TPE)
2014 Incheon	Zhang Nan and Zhao Yunlei (CHN)	Tontowi Ahmad and Liliyana Natsir (INA)	Xu Chen and Ma Jin (CHN)
2014 Incheon	Zhang Nan and Zhao Yunlei (CHN)	Tontowi Ahmad and Liliyana Natsir (INA)	Praveen Jordan and Debby Susanto (INA)
2018 Jakarta–Palembang	Zheng Siwei and Huang Yaqiong (CHN)	Tang Chun Man and Tse Ying Suet (HKG)	Wang Yilü and Huang Dongping (CHN)
2018 Jakarta–Palembang	Zheng Siwei and Huang Yaqiong (CHN)	Tang Chun Man and Tse Ying Suet (HKG)	Tontowi Ahmad and Liliyana Natsir (INA)
2022 Hangzhou	Zheng Siwei and Huang Yaqiong (CHN)	Yuta Watanabe and Arisa Higashino (JPN)	Feng Yanzhe and Huang Dongping (CHN)
2022 Hangzhou	Zheng Siwei and Huang Yaqiong (CHN)	Yuta Watanabe and Arisa Higashino (JPN)	Seo Seung-jae and Chae Yoo-jung (KOR)
2026 Aichi–Nagoya	Jiang Zhenbang and Wei Yaxin (CHN)	Amri Syahnawi and Nita Violina Marwah (INA)	Feng Yanzhe and Huang Dongping (CHN)
2026 Aichi–Nagoya	Jiang Zhenbang and Wei Yaxin (CHN)	Amri Syahnawi and Nita Violina Marwah (INA)	Ye Hong-wei and Nicole Gonzales Chan (TPE)
