= Badminton at the 1966 Asian Games – Men's team =

Men's team at the 1966 Asian Games
- Venue: Kittikachorn Stadium, Thailand
- Dates: 10 – 17 December 1966

Medalists
gold medal	Thailand; Chavalert Chumkum, Narong Bhornchima, Raphi Kanchanaraphi, Channarong Ratanaseangsuang, Sangob Rattanusorn, Sila Ulao, Charoen Wattanasin
silver medal	Malaysia; Eddy Choong, Khor Cheng Chye, Billy Ng, Ng Boon Bee, Tan Yee Khan, Teh Kew San, Yew Cheng Hoe
bronze medal	Republic of China; Ho Wen-ming, Lin Chiung-chih, Cheng Wen-chiao, Huang Liang-en, Shih Chin-piao
bronze medal	Japan; Masao Akiyama, Ippei Kojima, Takeshi Miyanaga, Eiichi Sakai

The badminton men's team tournament at the 1966 Asian Games took place from 10 to 17 December at the Kittikachorn Stadium in Bangkok, Thailand.

== Bracket ==
Round of 16
Republic of China	8
South Korea	1
Philippines	w/o
Pakistan
Malaysia	5
Burma	4
Indonesia	9
Nepal	0
Japan	w/o
India

Quarter-finals
Thailand	5
Ceylon	4
Republic of China	5
Philippines	4
Malaysia	5
Indonesia	4
Japan	5
Hong Kong	4

Semi-finals
Thailand	5
Republic of China	4
Malaysia	5
Japan	4

Gold medal match
Thailand	5
Malaysia	4

== Semi-finals ==
=== Thailand vs Republic of China (Taiwan) ===
Thailand
5
Kittikachorn Stadium
14–15 December 1966

Republic оf China
4

			1	2	3
1	(Thailand) (Taiwan)	Channarong Ratanaseangsuang; Lin Chiung-chih	15; 2	15; 3
2	(Thailand) (Taiwan)	Sangob Rattanusorn; Huang Liang-en	15; 4	15; 3
3	(Thailand) (Taiwan)	Raphi Kanchanaraphi / Charoen Wattanasin; Ho Wen-ming / Shih Chin-piao	15; 3	15; 4
4	(Thailand) (Taiwan)	Narong Bhornchima / Chavalert Chumkum; Huang Liang-en / Lin Chiung-chih	15; 2	15; 11
5	(Thailand) (Taiwan)	Narong Bhornchima; Cheng Wen-chiao	15; 1	15; 6
6	(Thailand) (Taiwan)	Channarong Ratanaseangsuang; Huang Liang-en				w/o
7	(Thailand) (Taiwan)	Sangob Rattanusorn; Lin Chiung-chih				w/o
8	(Thailand) (Taiwan)	Narong Bhornchima / Chavalert Chumkum; Ho Wen-ming / Shih Chin-piao				w/o
9	(Thailand) (Taiwan)	Raphi Kanchanaraphi / Charoen Wattanasin; Huang Liang-en / Lin Chiung-chih				w/o

=== Malaysia vs Japan ===
Malaysia
5
Kittikachorn Stadium
14–15 December 1966

Japan
4

			1	2	3
1	(Malaysia) (Japan)	Yew Cheng Hoe; Masao Akiyama	15; 12	15; 12
2	(Malaysia) (Japan)	Teh Kew San; Ippei Kojima	6; 15	7; 15
3	(Malaysia) (Japan)	Ng Boon Bee / Tan Yee Khan; Takeshi Miyanaga / Eiichi Sakai	15; 7	15; 12
4	(Malaysia) (Japan)	Khor Cheng Chye / Yew Cheng Hoe; Masao Akiyama / Ippei Kojima	11; 15	15; 11	15; 12
5	(Malaysia) (Japan)	Yew Cheng Hoe; Ippei Kojima	15; 4	15; 11
6	(Malaysia) (Japan)	Teh Kew San; Masao Akiyama	6; 15	17; 14	15; 1
7	(Malaysia) (Japan)	Billy Ng; Takeshi Miyanaga				w/o
8	(Malaysia) (Japan)	Khor Cheng Chye / Yew Cheng Hoe; Takeshi Miyanaga / Eiichi Sakai				w/o
9	(Malaysia) (Japan)	Ng Boon Bee / Tan Yee Khan; Masao Akiyama / Ippei Kojima				w/o

== Gold medal match ==
=== Thailand vs Malaysia ===
Thailand
5
Kittikachorn Stadium
16–17 December 1966

Malaysia
4

			1	2	3
1	(Thailand) (Malaysia)	Channarong Ratanaseangsuang; Yew Cheng Hoe	17; 17	15; 2
2	(Thailand) (Malaysia)	Sangob Rattanusorn; Teh Kew San	12; 3	9; 11
3	(Thailand) (Malaysia)	Narong Bhornchima / Chavalert Chumkum; Khor Cheng Chye / Yew Cheng Hoe	18; 17	15; 7
4	(Thailand) (Malaysia)	Raphi Kanchanaraphi / Charoen Wattanasin; Ng Boon Bee / Tan Yee Khan	10; 15	6; 15
5	(Thailand) (Malaysia)	Narong Bhornchima; Tan Yee Khan	7; 15	15; 2	15; 5
6	(Thailand) (Malaysia)	Channarong Ratanaseangsuang; Teh Kew San	9; 2	8; 8
7	(Thailand) (Malaysia)	Sangob Rattanusorn; Yew Cheng Hoe				w/o
8	(Thailand) (Malaysia)	Raphi Kanchanaraphi / Charoen Wattanasin; Khor Cheng Chye / Yew Cheng Hoe				w/o
9	(Thailand) (Malaysia)	Narong Bhornchima / Chavalert Chumkum; Ng Boon Bee / Tan Yee Khan				w/o
