= Iran at the 1966 Asian Games =

- IOC code: IRN
- NOC: National Olympic Committee of the Islamic Republic of Iran

in Bangkok
- Competitors: 118 in 12 sports
- Flag bearer: Mansour Mehdizadeh
- Medals Ranked 6th: Gold 6 Silver 8 Bronze 17 Total 31

Asian Games appearances (overview)
- 1951; 1954; 1958; 1962; 1966; 1970; 1974; 1978; 1982; 1986; 1990; 1994; 1998; 2002; 2006; 2010; 2014; 2018; 2022; 2026

Iran participated in the 1966 Asian Games held in the capital city of Bangkok, and ranked sixth with six gold medals on this occasion of the Asiad.

== Medal summary ==
=== Medals by sport ===
Sport	Gold	Silver	Bronze	Total
Wrestling	3	5	0	8
Weightlifting	3	0	4	7
Athletics	0	2	2	4
Football	0	1	0	1
Boxing	0	0	4	4
Cycling	0	0	2	2
Tennis	0	0	2	2
Volleyball	0	0	2	2
Table tennis	0	0	1	1
Totals (9 entries)	6	8	17	31

== Results by event ==
=== Athletics ===
- Silver
  - Ahmad Mirhosseini - Men's 3000 m steeplechase
  - Jalal Keshmiri - Men's discus throw
- Bronze
  - Teymour Ghiassi - Men's high jump
  - Jalal Keshmiri - Men's shot put

=== Boxing ===
Athlete	Event	Round of 16	Quarterfinal	Semifinal	Final	Rank
Wilhelm Younani	Men's 51 kg	Kamrani (PAK); W PTS	Sato (JPN); L PTS	Did not advance		5
Nasser Aghaei	Men's 57 kg	Bye	Lau (HKG); W PTS	Chandarasukhon (THA); L PTS	Did not advance	3rd place, bronze medalist(s)
Eltefat Talebi	Men's 60 kg	Bye	Vuilleumier (MAL); W PTS	Arpon (PHI); L PTS	Did not advance	3rd place, bronze medalist(s)
Roubik Atoun	Men's 67 kg	—N/a	Songsang (THA); L PTS	Did not advance		5
Iraj Salami Kohan	Men's 71 kg	—N/a	Ghaznavi (PAK); L WO	Did not advance		5
Amir Dallal	Men's 75 kg	—N/a	Sato (JPN); L KO	Did not advance		5
Aloush Abbasi	Men's 81 kg	—N/a		Chandramanee (THA); L PTS	Did not advance	3rd place, bronze medalist(s)
Hossein Fathianpour	Men's +81 kg	—N/a	Bye	Singh (IND); L PTS	Did not advance	3rd place, bronze medalist(s)

=== Cycling ===
==== Road ====
- Bronze
  - Team - Men's team time trial
    - Team roster
      - Hassan Roustaei
      - Mehdi Doukchi
      - Davoud Akhlaghi
      - Esmaeil Hosseini

==== Track ====
- Bronze
  - Esmaeil Hosseini - Men's individual pursuit

=== Football ===
- Silver
  - Team - Men
    - Team roster
      - Aziz Asli
      - Faramarz Zelli
      - Parviz Ghelichkhani
      - Hassan Habibi
      - Hamid Jasemian
      - Goudarz Habibi
      - Mohammad Ranjbar
      - Jalal Talebi
      - Mostafa Arab
      - Hossein Farzami
      - Ali Jabbari
      - Hamid Aminikhah
      - Akbar Eftekhari
      - Abdollah Saedi
      - Fariborz Esmaeili
      - Hamid Shirzadeghan
      - Homayoun Behzadi
      - Parviz Mirzahassan
    - Head coach: Gyorgy Szucs

=== Table tennis ===
- Bronze
  - Houshang Bozorgzadeh - Men's singles

=== Tennis ===
- Bronze
  - Taghi Akbari - Men's singles
  - Team - Men's team
    - Team roster
      - Taghi Akbari
      - Ezzatollah Nemati
      - Nematollah Nemati
      - Issa Khodaei

=== Volleyball ===
- Bronze
  - Team - Men
    - Team roster
      - Mahmoud Motlagh
      - Hassan Kord
      - Masoud Salehieh
      - Khalil Paknazar
      - Changiz Ansari
      - Hassan Kabiri
      - Mohammad Hemmatyar
      - Mojtaba Mortazavi
    - Head coach: Hossein Jabbarzadegan
  - Team - Women
    - Team roster
      - Mari Tet
      - Rouhi Pandnavaz
      - Mehri Kharrazi
      - Ozra Malek
      - Mina Fathi
      - Nasrin Shokoufi
      - Leila Emami
      - Pari Fardi
      - Jaleh Seyed-Hadizadeh
    - Head coach: Fereydoon Sharifzadeh

=== Weightlifting ===
- Gold
  - Mohammad Nassiri - Men's 56 kg
  - Parviz Jalayer - Men's 67.5 kg
  - Manouchehr Boroumand - Men's +90 kg
- Bronze
  - Mohammadreza Nasehi - Men's 52 kg
  - Mohammad Ammi Tehrani - Men's 75 kg
  - Naser Doroudian - Men's 90 kg
  - Reza Esteki - Men's +90 kg

=== Wrestling ===
- Gold
  - Abdollah Movahed - Men's 70 kg
  - Mansour Mehdizadeh - Men's 97 kg
  - Eskandar Filabi - Men's +97 kg
- Silver
  - Ali Akbar Heidari - Men's 52 kg
  - Mohammad Ali Farrokhian - Men's 57 kg
  - Mohammad Ebrahim Seifpour - Men's 63 kg
  - Hossein Tahami - Men's 78 kg
  - Mahmoud Moezzipour - Men's 87 kg
