= Boxing at the 1966 Asian Games =

Boxing competitions

- Venue: Indoor Stadium Huamark
- Dates: 10–16 December 1966
- Competitors: 91 from 15 nations

The Boxing Tournament at the 1966 Asian Games was held in Indoor Stadium Huamark, Bangkok, Thailand from 10 December 1966 to 16 December 1966.

South Korea topped the medal table by winning five gold medals, The hosts Thailand were second with three gold medals.

== Medalists ==
Event	Gold	Silver	Bronze
Light flyweight (48 kg)	Prapan Duangchaoom; Thailand	Su Sang-young; South Korea	Rodolfo Diaz; Philippines
Light flyweight (48 kg)	Prapan Duangchaoom; Thailand	Su Sang-young; South Korea	Masao Karasawa; Japan
Flyweight (51 kg)	Son Young-chan; South Korea	Idwan Anwar; Indonesia	Ahmad Mokhtar; Malaysia
Flyweight (51 kg)	Son Young-chan; South Korea	Idwan Anwar; Indonesia	Akinami Sato; Japan
Bantamweight (54 kg)	Cherdchai Udompaichitkul; Thailand	Narayan More; India	Win Maung; Burma
Bantamweight (54 kg)	Cherdchai Udompaichitkul; Thailand	Narayan More; India	Koichi Okada; Japan
Featherweight (57 kg)	Kim Sung-eun; South Korea	Thongchai Chandarasukhon; Thailand	Harunobu Honma; Japan
Featherweight (57 kg)	Kim Sung-eun; South Korea	Thongchai Chandarasukhon; Thailand	Nasser Aghaei; Iran
Lightweight (60 kg)	Rodolfo Arpon; Philippines	Lee Moon-ung; South Korea	Masataka Takayama; Japan
Lightweight (60 kg)	Rodolfo Arpon; Philippines	Lee Moon-ung; South Korea	Eltefat Talebi; Iran
Light welterweight (63.5 kg)	Niyom Prasertsom; Thailand	Said Fidal; Indonesia	Yoshihisa Futomi; Japan
Light welterweight (63.5 kg)	Niyom Prasertsom; Thailand	Said Fidal; Indonesia	Muhammad Khaliq; Pakistan
Welterweight (67 kg)	Park Koo-il; South Korea	Sukda Songsang; Thailand	Hideo Mukubayashi; Japan
Welterweight (67 kg)	Park Koo-il; South Korea	Sukda Songsang; Thailand	Terence Stahlman; Malaysia
Light middleweight (71 kg)	Lee Hong-man; South Korea	Muhammad Ghaznavi; Pakistan	Felix Ocampo; Philippines
Light middleweight (71 kg)	Lee Hong-man; South Korea	Muhammad Ghaznavi; Pakistan	Toyohiro Yamamoto; Japan
Middleweight (75 kg)	Seiichi Sato; Japan	Lee Kum-taik; South Korea	Bernardo Belleza; Philippines
Middleweight (75 kg)	Seiichi Sato; Japan	Lee Kum-taik; South Korea	Chaiyoot Thuito; Thailand
Light heavyweight (81 kg)	Kim Duk-pal; South Korea	Chaliew Chandramanee; Thailand	Barkat Ali; Pakistan
Light heavyweight (81 kg)	Kim Duk-pal; South Korea	Chaliew Chandramanee; Thailand	Aloush Abbasi; Iran
Heavyweight (+81 kg)	Hawa Singh; India	Abdul Rehman; Pakistan	Hossein Fathianpour; Iran
Heavyweight (+81 kg)	Hawa Singh; India	Abdul Rehman; Pakistan	Lee Chun-in; South Korea

== Medal table ==
Rank	Nation	Gold	Silver	Bronze	Total
1	South Korea (KOR)	5	3	1	9
2	Thailand (THA)	3	3	1	7
3	India (IND)	1	1	0	2
4	Japan (JPN)	1	0	8	9
5	Philippines (PHI)	1	0	3	4
6	Pakistan (PAK)	0	2	2	4
7	Indonesia (INA)	0	2	0	2
8	Iran (IRN)	0	0	4	4
9	Malaysia (MAL)	0	0	2	2
10	Burma (BIR)	0	0	1	1
Totals (10 entries)		11	11	22	44

== Participating nations ==
A total of 91 athletes from 15 nations competed in boxing at the 1966 Asian Games:

- Burma (6)
- Ceylon (5)
- Hong Kong (3)
- India (2)
- Indonesia (3)
- Iran (8)
- Japan (9)
- Malaysia (7)
- Pakistan (10)
- Philippines (6)
- Republic of China (6)
- Singapore (3)
- South Korea (11)
- South Vietnam (1)
- Thailand (11)
