= Badminton at the 1966 Asian Games – Women's team =

Women's team at the 1966 Asian Games
- Venue: Kittikachorn Stadium, Thailand
- Dates: 10 – 13 December 1966

Medalists
gold medal	Japan; Hiroe Amano, Kazuko Gotō, Noriko Takagi, Tomoko Takahashi
silver medal	Thailand; Sumol Chanklum, Boopha Kaenthong, Pachara Pattabongse, Pratuang Pattabongse
bronze medal	South Korea; Kang Young-sin, Lee Young-soon
bronze medal	Indonesia; Retno Koestijah, Minarni, Nurhaena, Tan Tjoen Ing

The badminton women's team tournament at the 1966 Asian Games took place from 10 to 13 December at the Kittikachorn Stadium in Bangkok, Thailand.

== Bracket ==
Semi-finals
Japan	4
Malaysia	3
Thailand	4
Burma	3

Gold medal match
Japan	4
Indonesia	3
Thailand	6
South Korea	1

Finals
Thailand	4
Japan	3

== Gold medal match ==
=== Thailand vs Japan ===
Japan
4
Kittikachorn Stadium
13 December 1966

Thailand
3

			1	2	3
1	(Japan) (Thailand)	Noriko Takagi; Sumol Chanklum	11; 7	11; 5
2	(Japan) (Thailand)	Tomoko Takahashi; Thongkam Kingmanee	6; 11	11; 1	3; 11
3	(Japan) (Thailand)	Kazuko Gotō; Boopha Kaenthong	11; 0	11; 1
4	(Japan) (Thailand)	Kazuko Gotō / Noriko Takagi; Pachara Pattabongse / Pratuang Pattabongse	18; 13	15; 12
5	(Japan) (Thailand)	Hiroe Amano / Tomoko Takahashi; Sumol Chanklum / Thongkam Kingmanee	15; 6	18; 14
6	(Japan) (Thailand)	Kazuko Gotō / Noriko Takagi; Sumol Chanklum / Thongkam Kingmanee				w/o
7	(Japan) (Thailand)	Hiroe Amano / Tomoko Takahashi; Pachara Pattabongse / Pratuang Pattabongse				w/o
