= Athletics at the 1966 Asian Games =

- Venue: National Stadium
- Dates: 10–15 December 1966

The Athletics events at the 1966 Asian Games were contested at the National Stadium in Bangkok, Thailand from 10 to 15 December.

== Medalists ==
=== Men ===
Event	Gold		Silver		Bronze	
100 m	Mani Jegathesan; Malaysia	10.5	C. Kunalan; Singapore	10.5	Hideo Iijima; Japan	10.5
200 m	Mani Jegathesan; Malaysia	21.5	Ajmer Singh; India	21.5	Thambu Krishnan; Malaysia	21.6
400 m	Ajmer Singh; India	47.1	Yoshinori Sakai; Japan	47.4	Masami Yoshida; Japan	47.5
800 m	Bhogeswar Baruah; India	1:49.4; GR	Ramasamy Subramaniam; Malaysia	1:49.5	Mamoru Morimoto; Japan	1:49.6
1500 m	Keisuke Sawaki; Japan	3:47.3; GR	Ramasamy Subramaniam; Malaysia	3:48.0	Satsuo Iwashita; Japan	3:48.1
5000 m	Keisuke Sawaki; Japan	14:22.0; GR	Kazuo Tsuchiya; Japan	14:23.1	Lucien Rosa; Ceylon	14:56.0
10,000 m	Kazuo Tsuchiya; Japan	30:27.8	Sunao Shirai; Japan	30:36.8	Lucien Rosa; Ceylon	31:06.6
110 m hurdles	Ghulam Raziq; Pakistan	14.4	Yoshinobu Hamada; Japan	14.5	Ishtiaq Mubarak; Malaysia	14.7
400 m hurdles	Kiyoo Yui; Japan	51.7; GR	Kazuhiko Itagaki; Japan	52.3	Andyappan Nathan; Malaysia	53.0
3000 m steeplechase	Taketsugu Saruwatari; Japan	8:53.6; GR	Ahmad Mirhosseini; Iran	8:56.5	Nobuyoshi Matsuda; Japan	9:05.2
4 × 100 m relay	Malaysia; Mohd Ariffin Ahmad; Thambu Krishnan; Rajalingam Gunaratnam; Mani Jegathesan	40.6; GR	Indonesia; Jootje Pesak Oroh; Soepardi; Bambamg Wahjudi; Agus Sugiri	41.0	Philippines; William Mordeno; Remegio Vista; Arnulfo Valles; Rogelio Onofre	41.3
4 × 400 m relay	Japan; Toru Honda; Yoshinori Sakai; Masami Yoshida; Kiyoo Yui	3:09.1; GR	Malaysia; Asir Victor; Rengan Pakkri; Andyappan Nathan; Thambu Krishnan	3:13.1	Singapore; Natahar Bava; Ho Mun Cheong; Gunasena Migale; C. Kunalan	3:13.4
Marathon	Kenji Kimihara; Japan	2:33:23	Morio Shigematsu; Japan	2:35:04	Lee Sang-hoon; South Korea	2:40:56
High jump	Bhim Singh; India	2.05	Osamu Shimizu; Japan	2.03	Teymour Ghiasi; Iran	2.00
Pole vault	Tetsuo Hirota; Japan	4.70; GR	Yoshizo Uryu; Japan	4.60	Hong Sang-pyo; South Korea	4.40
Long jump	Hiroomi Yamada; Japan	7.48	Takayuki Okazaki; Japan	7.39	Su Wen-ho; Republic of China	7.31
Triple jump	Kosei Gushiken; Japan	15.61	Satoshi Shimo; Japan	15.54	Labh Singh; India	15.49
Shot put	Joginder Singh; India	16.22; GR	Yoshihisa Ishida; Japan	16.13	Jalal Keshmiri; Iran	16.02
Discus throw	Praveen Kumar Sobti; India	49.62; GR	Jalal Keshmiri; Iran	49.30	Balkar Singh; India	47.64
Hammer throw	Takeo Sugawara; Japan	62.90	Shigenobu Murofushi; Japan	60.02	Praveen Kumar Sobti; India	57.18
Javelin throw	Nashatar Singh Sidhu; Malaysia	72.92	Takeshi Ikeda; Japan	68.24	Yumio Miyoshi; Japan	67.86
Decathlon	Wu Ah-min; Republic of China	7003	Yukuo Nogami; Japan	6613	Hiroomi Yamada; Japan	6553

=== Women ===
Event	Gold		Silver		Bronze	
100 m	Miho Sato; Japan	12.3	Ritsuko Sukegawa; Japan	12.4	Debra Marcus; Israel	12.5
200 m	Debra Marcus; Israel	25.3	Miyoko Tsujishita; Japan	25.3	Kishiko Ikeda; Japan	25.7
400 m	Mary Rajamani; Malaysia	56.3; GR	Han Myung-hee; South Korea	57.5	Yasuyo Mishima; Japan	57.7
800 m	Hana Shezifi; Israel	2:10.5; GR	Yoko Miyamoto; Japan	2:12.7	Yasuyo Mishima; Japan	2:13.6
80 m hurdles	Ritsuko Sukegawa; Japan	11.2 =GR	Takako Abe; Japan	11.4	Manjit Walia; India	11.4
4 × 100 m relay	Japan; Ritsuko Sukegawa; Kishiko Ikeda; Miho Sato; Miyoko Tsujishita	47.1; GR	Republic of China; Chi Cheng; Tien Ah-mei; Yeh Chu-mei; Huang Pi-yun	47.8	Malaysia; Jacqueline Kleinman; Mary Rajamani; Rajemah Sheikh Ahmad; Cheryl Dorall	48.8
High jump	Mami Takeda; Japan	1.60 =GR	Lolita Lagrosas; Philippines	1.58	Cheong Wai Hing; Singapore	1.55
Long jump	Chi Cheng; Republic of China	5.95 =GR	Emiko Komaru; Japan	5.83	Christine Forage; India	5.69
Shot put	Ryoko Sugiyama; Japan	14.48; GR	Yuko Sawada; Japan	13.92	Wu Jin-yun; Republic of China	12.83
Discus throw	Josephine de la Viña; Philippines	47.58; GR	Yuko Tsunoda; Japan	42.34	Han Dong-si; South Korea	41.08
Javelin throw	Misako Katayama; Japan	49.44; GR	Sachiko Senzaki; Japan	42.50	Marcelina Alonso; Philippines	40.90
Pentathlon	Michiko Okamoto; Japan	4468; GR	Yeh Chu-mei; Republic of China	3951	Lolita Lagrosas; Philippines	3889

== Medal table ==
Rank	Nation	Gold	Silver	Bronze	Total
1	Japan (JPN)	18	22	10	50
2	Malaysia (MAL)	5	3	4	12
3	India (IND)	5	1	5	11
4	Republic of China (ROC)	2	2	2	6
5	Israel (ISR)	2	0	1	3
6	Philippines (PHI)	1	1	3	5
7	Pakistan (PAK)	1	0	0	1
8	Iran (IRN)	0	2	2	4
9	South Korea (KOR)	0	1	3	4
10	Singapore (SIN)	0	1	2	3
11	Indonesia (INA)	0	1	0	1
12	Ceylon (CEY)	0	0	2	2
Totals (12 entries)		34	34	34	102
