= Malaysia at the 1966 Asian Games =

- IOC code: MAL
- NOC: Olympic Council of Malaysia
- Website: www.olympic.org.my (in English)

in Bangkok
- Competitors: 155 in 13 sports
- Flag bearer: M.Doraisamy
- Medals Ranked 4th: Gold 7 Silver 5 Bronze 6 Total 18

Asian Games appearances (overview)
- 1954; 1958; 1962; 1966; 1970; 1974; 1978; 1982; 1986; 1990; 1994; 1998; 2002; 2006; 2010; 2014; 2018; 2022; 2026

Other related appearances
- North Borneo (1954, 1958, 1962); Sarawak (1962)

Malaysia competed in the 1966 Asian Games held in Bangkok, Thailand from 9 December 1966 to 20 December 1966. This country is ranked number 4 with 7 gold medals, 5 silver medals and 6 bronze medals.

== Medal summary ==
=== Medals by sport ===
Sport	Gold	Silver	Bronze	Total	Rank
Athletics	5	3	4	12	2
Badminton	2	2	0	4	2
Boxing	0	0	2	2	9
Total	7	5	6	18	4

=== Medallists ===
Medal	Name	Sport	Event
Gold	Mani Jegathesan	Athletics	Men's 100 metres
Gold	Mani Jegathesan	Athletics	Men's 200 metres
Gold	Mani Jegathesan; Mohd Ariffin Ahmad; Rajalingam Gunaratnam; Thomboo Krishnan	Athletics	Men's 4 × 100 metres relay
Gold	Nashatar Singh Sidhu	Athletics	Men's javelin throw
Gold	Mary Rajamani	Athletics	Women's 400 metres
Gold	Ng Boon Bee; Tan Yee Khan	Badminton	Men's doubles
Gold	Teh Kew San; Rosalind Singha Ang	Badminton	Mixed doubles
Silver	Ramasamy Subramaniam	Athletics	Men's 800 metres
Silver	Ramasamy Subramaniam	Athletics	Men's 1500 metres
Silver	Andyappan Nathan; Rengan Pakkri; Thomboo Krishnan; Victor Asirvatham	Athletics	Men's 4 × 400 metres relay
Silver	Eddy Choong; Tan Gaik Bee	Badminton	Mixed doubles
Silver	Billy Ng; Eddy Choong; Khor Cheng Chye; Ng Boon Bee; Tan Yee Khan; Teh Kew San; Yew Cheng Hoe	Badminton	Men's team
Bronze	Thomboo Krishnan	Athletics	Men's 200 metres
Bronze	Ishtiaq Mubarak	Athletics	Men's 110 metres hurdles
Bronze	Andyappan Nathan	Athletics	Men's 400 metres hurdles
Bronze	Cheryl Dorall; Jacqueline Kleinman; Mary Rajamani; Rajemah Sheikh Ahmad	Athletics	Women's 4 × 100 metres relay
Bronze	Ahmad Mokhtar	Boxing	Men's 51 kg
Bronze	Terence Stahlman	Boxing	Men's 67 kg

== Athletics ==
Key

- Note–Ranks given for track events are within the athlete's heat only
- Q = Qualified for the next round
- q = Qualified for the next round as a fastest loser or, in field events, by position without achieving the qualifying target
- NR = National record
- N/A = Round not applicable for the event
- Bye = Athlete not required to compete in round

Men
Track events

Athlete	Event	Final	
Athlete	Event	Time	Rank
Mani Jegathesan	100 m	10.5	1st place, gold medalist(s)
Mani Jegathesan	200 m	21.5	1st place, gold medalist(s)
Thomboo Krishnan	200 m	21.6	3rd place, bronze medalist(s)
Ramasamy Subramaniam	800 m	1:49.5	2nd place, silver medalist(s)
Ramasamy Subramaniam	1500 m	3:48.0	2nd place, silver medalist(s)
Ishtiaq Mubarak	110 m hurdles	14.7	3rd place, bronze medalist(s)
Andyappan Nathan	400 m hurdles	53.0	3rd place, bronze medalist(s)
Mani Jegathesan; Mohd Ariffin Ahmad; Rajalingam Gunaratnam; Thomboo Krishnan	4 × 100 m relay	40.6 GR	1st place, gold medalist(s)
Andyappan Nathan; Rengan Pakkri; Thomboo Krishnan; Victor Asirvatham	4 × 400 m relay	3:13.1	2nd place, silver medalist(s)

Field event

Athlete	Event	Final	
Athlete	Event	Distance	Rank
Nashatar Singh Sidhu	Javelin throw	72.92	1st place, gold medalist(s)

Women
Track events

Athlete	Event	Final	
Athlete	Event	Time	Rank
Mary Rajamani	400 m	56.3 GR	1st place, gold medalist(s)
Cheryl Dorall; Jacqueline Kleinman; Mary Rajamani; Rajemah Sheikh Ahmad	4 × 100 m relay	48.8	3rd place, bronze medalist(s)

== Badminton ==
Athlete	Event	Round of 16	Quarterfinal	Semifinal	Final	Rank
Athlete	Event	Opposition Score	Opposition Score	Opposition Score	Opposition Score	Rank
Ng Boon Bee; Tan Yee Khan	Men's doubles				Gold medal match Indonesia (INA); Ang Tjin Siang; Tjoa Tjong Boan; W	1st place, gold medalist(s)
Billy Ng; Eddy Choong; Khor Cheng Chye; Ng Boon Bee; Tan Yee Khan; Teh Kew San; Yew Cheng Hoe	Men's team	Burma (BIR); W 5–4	Indonesia (INA); W 5–4	Japan (JPN); W 5–4	Gold medal match Indonesia (INA); L 4–5	2nd place, silver medalist(s)
Rosalind Singha Ang; Tan Gaik Bee	Women's team	—	Japan (JPN); L 3–4	did not advance		
Teh Kew San; Rosalind Singha Ang	Mixed doubles				Gold medal match Malaysia (MAS); Eddy Choong; Tan Gaik Bee; W	1st place, gold medalist(s)
Eddy Choong; Tan Gaik Bee	Mixed doubles				Gold medal match Malaysia (MAS); Teh Kew San; Rosalind Singha Ang; L	2nd place, silver medalist(s)

== Basketball ==
=== Men's tournament ===
Group A

Team	Pld	W	L	PF	PA	PD	Pts
Japan	4	4	0	326	199	+127	8
Thailand	4	3	1	327	274	+53	7
Republic of China	4	2	2	355	301	+54	6
Malaysia	4	1	3	259	293	−34	5
Ceylon	4	0	4	251	451	−200	4

Qualified for the 5th – 8th classification

10 December

Thailand	70–58	Malaysia

Nimibutr Stadium, Bangkok

11 December

Japan	69–34	Malaysia

Nimibutr Stadium, Bangkok

14 December

Malaysia	87–53	Ceylon

Nimibutr Stadium, Bangkok

15 December

Republic of China	101–80	Malaysia

Nimibutr Stadium, Bangkok

Fifth to eighth place classification

17 December

Philippines	113–73	Malaysia

Nimibutr Stadium, Bangkok

Seventh and eighth place match

19 December

Iran	95–88	Malaysia

Nimibutr Stadium, Bangkok

Ranked 8th in final standings

== Boxing ==
Athlete	Event	Final	Rank
Athlete	Event	Opposition Score	Rank
Ahmad Mokhtar	Men's 51 kg		3rd place, bronze medalist(s)
Terence Stahlman	Men's 67 kg		3rd place, bronze medalist(s)

== Field hockey ==
=== Men's tournament ===
Group B

Team	Pld	W	D	L	GF	GA	GD	Pts
India	3	3	0	0	5	0	+5	6
Malaysia	3	1	1	1	2	1	+1	3
South Korea	3	1	0	2	1	3	−2	2
Ceylon	3	0	1	2	0	4	−4	1

Qualified for the semifinals

11 December

India	1–0	Malaysia

Bangkok

12 December

Malaysia	2–0	South Korea

Bangkok

15 December

Malaysia	0–0	Ceylon

Bangkok

Semifinal

16 December

Pakistan	5–1	Malaysia

Bangkok

Bronze medal match

19 December

Malaysia	0–1	Japan

Bangkok

Ranked 4th in final standings

== Football ==
=== Men's tournament ===
Group B

Team	Pld	W	D	L	GF	GA	GAV	Pts
Japan	3	3	0	0	6	2	3.000	6
Iran	3	2	0	1	7	4	1.750	4
India	3	1	0	2	4	7	0.571	2
Malaysia	3	0	0	3	1	5	0.200	0

Qualified for the quarterfinals

10 December

Iran	2–0	Malaysia

Bangkok

12 December

Malaysia	1–2	India

Bangkok

14 December

Malaysia	0–1	Japan

Bangkok

Ranked 10th in final standings

== Volleyball ==
=== Men's tournament ===
Pool A

Pos	Team	Pld	W	L	Pts	SW	SL	SR	Qualification
1	India	3	3	0	6	9	1	9.000	Final round
2	Thailand	3	2	1	5	6	4	1.500	Final round
3	Philippines	3	1	2	4	5	8	0.625	Classification 7th–12th
4	Malaysia	3	0	3	3	2	9	0.222	Classification 7th–12th

Source: Results

Date		Score		Set 1	Set 2	Set 3	Set 4	Set 5	Total
10 Dec	Thailand	3–0	Malaysia						
11 Dec	India	3–0	Malaysia	15–2	15–3	15–9			45–14
12 Dec	Philippines	3–2	Malaysia	15–6	11–15	15–3	12–15	15–1	68–40

Seventh to twelfth place classification

Pos	Team	Pld	W	L	Pts	SW	SL	SR
1	Republic of China	5	5	0	10	15	1	15.000
2	Philippines	5	4	1	9	12	3	4.000
3	Pakistan	5	3	2	7	9	7	1.286
4	South Vietnam	5	2	3	7	8	11	0.727
5	Ceylon	5	1	4	6	5	12	0.417
6	Malaysia	5	0	5	5	0	15	0.000

Source: Results

Date		Score		Set 1	Set 2	Set 3	Set 4	Set 5	Total
13 Dec	Republic of China	3–0	Malaysia						
14 Dec	Pakistan	3–0	Malaysia						
16 Dec	Philippines	3–0	Malaysia	18–16	15–7	15–7			48–30
17 Dec	Malaysia	0–3	South Vietnam						
18 Dec	Malaysia	0–3	Ceylon						

Ranked 12th in final standings

== Water polo ==
=== Men's tournament ===
Final round

Team	Pld	W	D	L	GF	GA	GD	Pts	Rank
Japan	4	4	0	0	46	8	+38	8	1st place, gold medalist(s)
Singapore	4	3	0	1	34	17	+17	6	2nd place, silver medalist(s)
Indonesia	4	2	0	2	21	21	0	4	3rd place, bronze medalist(s)
Malaysia	4	1	0	3	21	36	−15	2	4
Thailand	4	0	0	4	5	45	−40	0	5

13 December	Singapore	13–5	Malaysia	Chula Swimming Stadium, Bangkok

14 December	Indonesia	7–6	Malaysia	Chula Swimming Stadium, Bangkok

16 December	Japan	12–3	Malaysia	Chula Swimming Stadium, Bangkok

17 December	Thailand	4–7	Malaysia	Chula Swimming Stadium, Bangkok

Ranked 4th in final standings
