= Diving at the 1966 Asian Games =

- Venue: Visutdrarom Swimming Pool
- Dates: 13–16 December 1966

Diving was contested at the 1966 Asian Games in Visutdrarom Swimming Pool, Bangkok, Thailand from December 13 to December 16, 1966.

== Medalists ==
=== Men ===
Event	Gold	Silver	Bronze
3 m springboard	Yasuo Yamawaki; Japan	Takashi Inoue; Japan	Billy Gumulya; Indonesia
10 m platform	Yosuke Arimitsu; Japan	Yasuo Yamawaki; Japan	Song Jae-ung; South Korea

=== Women ===
Event	Gold	Silver	Bronze
3 m springboard	Keiko Osaki; Japan	Nobuyo Ishiguro; Japan	Connie Paredes; Philippines
10 m platform	Keiko Osaki; Japan	Nobuyo Ishiguro; Japan	Kim Young-chae; South Korea

== Medal table ==
Rank	Nation	Gold	Silver	Bronze	Total
1	Japan (JPN)	4	4	0	8
2	South Korea (KOR)	0	0	2	2
3	Indonesia (INA)	0	0	1	1
3	Philippines (PHI)	0	0	1	1
Totals (4 entries)		4	4	4	12
