= Wrestling at the 1966 Asian Games =

- Dates: 10–13 December 1966

Wrestling was one of the sports which was held at the 1966 Asian Games in Bangkok, Thailand between 10 and 13 December 1966. The competition included only men's freestyle events. Japan, Iran and Pakistan, in that order, were at the top of the medals table at the event.

== Medalists ==
Event	Gold	Silver	Bronze
Flyweight (52 kg)	Shigeo Nakata; Japan	Ali Akbar Heidari; Iran	Shamrao Sable; India
Bantamweight (57 kg)	Tadamichi Tanaka; Japan	Mohammad Ali Farrokhian; Iran	Bishambar Singh; India
Featherweight (63 kg)	Masaaki Kaneko; Japan	Ebrahim Seifpour; Iran	Chang Kyung-mu; South Korea
Lightweight (70 kg)	Abdollah Movahed; Iran	Yoshiharu Tobita; Japan	Udey Chand; India
Welterweight (78 kg)	Muhammad Bashir; Pakistan	Hossein Tahami; Iran	Suh Young-suk; South Korea
Middleweight (87 kg)	Tatsuo Sasaki; Japan	Mahmoud Moezzipour; Iran	Sajjan Singh; India
Light heavyweight (97 kg)	Mansour Mehdizadeh; Iran	Bishwanath Singh; India	Shunichi Kawano; Japan
Heavyweight (+97 kg)	Moslem Eskandar-Filabi; Iran	Muhammad Saeed; Pakistan	Bhim Singh; India

== Medal table ==
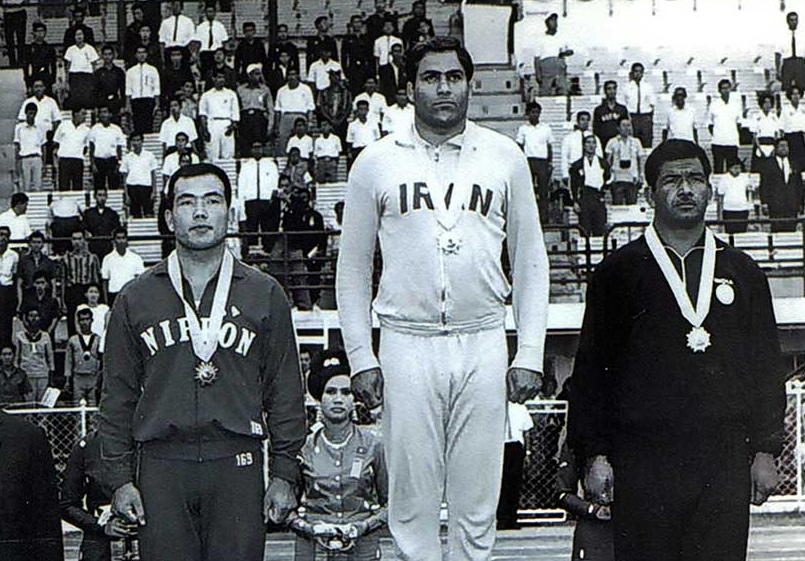
Medal winners of freestyle 97 kg. From right to left, Bishwanath Singh, Mansour Mehdizadeh and Shunichi Kawano

Rank	Nation	Gold	Silver	Bronze	Total
1	Japan (JPN)	4	1	1	6
2	Iran (IRN)	3	5	0	8
3	Pakistan (PAK)	1	1	0	2
4	India (IND)	0	1	5	6
5	South Korea (KOR)	0	0	2	2
Totals (5 entries)		8	8	8	24
