= Athletics at the 1967 Summer Universiade – Women's 80 metres hurdles =

Women's 80 metres hurdles event at the 1967 Summer Universiade

The women's 80 metres hurdles event at the 1967 Summer Universiade was held at the National Olympic Stadium in Tokyo on 1 and 2 September 1967.

== Medalists ==
Gold	Silver	Bronze
Françoise Masse; France	Sheila Garnett; Great Britain	Ayako Natsume; Japan

== Results ==
=== Heats ===
Rank	Heat	Athlete	Nationality	Time	Notes
1	1	Ayako Natsume	Japan	11.2	Q
2	1	Françoise Masse	France	11.3	Q
3	1	Eileen Dawson	Great Britain	11.7	Q
4	1	Glória Ferraz	Brazil	11.9	Q
5	1	Pam Sinclair	Australia	12.5	
1	2	Sheila Garnett	Great Britain	11.4	Q
2	2	Carla Panerai	Italy	11.7	Q
3	2	Naoko Tsujino	Japan	11.7	Q
4	2	Manjit Walia	India	11.8	Q
5	2	Janette Laplaud	France	11.9	

=== Final ===
Wind: -0.5 m/s

Rank	Name	Nationality	Time	Notes
1st place, gold medalist(s)	Françoise Masse	France	11.3	
2nd place, silver medalist(s)	Sheila Garnett	Great Britain	11.3	
3rd place, bronze medalist(s)	Ayako Natsume	Japan	11.3	
4	Naoko Tsujino	Japan	11.4	
5	Carla Panerai	Italy	11.6	
6	Eileen Dawson	Great Britain	11.7	
7	Manjit Walia	India	11.7	
8	Glória Ferraz	Brazil	11.9	
