= Badminton at the 1966 Asian Games =

- Venue: Kittikachorn Stadium
- Dates: 10–20 December

Badminton tournaments were held for the second time at the fifth Asian Games in 1966 in Indoor Stadium Huamark, Bangkok from 10 to 20 December 1966.

Singles, doubles, and team events were contested for both men and women. Mixed Doubles were also contested.

== Medalists ==
| Event | Gold | Silver | Bronze |
|---|---|---|---|
| Men's singles | Ang Tjin Siang; Indonesia | Wong Pek Sen; Indonesia | Kyi Nyunt; Burma |
| Men's singles | Ang Tjin Siang; Indonesia | Wong Pek Sen; Indonesia | Masao Akiyama; Japan |
| Men's doubles | Malaysia; Ng Boon Bee; Tan Yee Khan | Indonesia; Ang Tjin Siang; Tjoa Tjong Boan | Indonesia; Tan King Gwan; Abdul Patah Unang |
| Men's doubles | Malaysia; Ng Boon Bee; Tan Yee Khan | Indonesia; Ang Tjin Siang; Tjoa Tjong Boan | Thailand; Charoen Wattanasin; Tuly Ulao |
| Men's team | Thailand; Chavalert Chumkum; Narong Bhornchima; Raphi Kanchanaraphi; Channarong Ratanaseangsuang; Sangob Rattanusorn; Tuly Ulao; Charoen Wattanasin | Malaysia; Eddy Choong; Khor Cheng Chye; Billy Ng; Ng Boon Bee; Tan Yee Khan; Teh Kew San; Yew Cheng Hoe | Republic of China; Ho Wen-ming; Lin Chiung-chih; Cheng Wen-chiao; Huang Liang-en; Shih Chin-piao |
| Men's team | Thailand; Chavalert Chumkum; Narong Bhornchima; Raphi Kanchanaraphi; Channarong Ratanaseangsuang; Sangob Rattanusorn; Tuly Ulao; Charoen Wattanasin | Malaysia; Eddy Choong; Khor Cheng Chye; Billy Ng; Ng Boon Bee; Tan Yee Khan; Teh Kew San; Yew Cheng Hoe | Japan; Masao Akiyama; Ippei Kojima; Takeshi Miyanaga; Eiichi Sakai |
| Women's singles | Noriko Takagi; Japan | Sumol Chanklum; Thailand | Minarni; Indonesia |
| Women's singles | Noriko Takagi; Japan | Sumol Chanklum; Thailand | Tomoko Takahashi; Japan |
| Women's doubles | Indonesia; Minarni; Retno Kustijah | Japan; Hiroe Amano; Tomoko Takahashi | Thailand; Pratuang Pattabongs; Achara Pattabongs |
| Women's doubles | Indonesia; Minarni; Retno Kustijah | Japan; Hiroe Amano; Tomoko Takahashi | Japan; Noriko Takagi; Kazuko Goto |
| Women's team | Japan; Hiroe Amano; Kazuko Goto; Noriko Takagi; Tomoko Takahashi | Thailand; Sumol Chanklum; Boobpa Kaentong; Achara Pattabongs; Pratuang Pattabongs | South Korea; Kang Young-sin; Lee Young-soon |
| Women's team | Japan; Hiroe Amano; Kazuko Goto; Noriko Takagi; Tomoko Takahashi | Thailand; Sumol Chanklum; Boobpa Kaentong; Achara Pattabongs; Pratuang Pattabongs | Indonesia; Retno Kustijah; Minarni; Nurhaena; Tan Tjoen Ing |
| Mixed doubles | Malaysia; Teh Kew San; Rosalind Singha Ang | Malaysia; Eddy Choong; Tan Gaik Bee | Indonesia; Wong Pek Sen; Minarni |
| Mixed doubles | Malaysia; Teh Kew San; Rosalind Singha Ang | Malaysia; Eddy Choong; Tan Gaik Bee | Indonesia; Tjoa Tjong Boan; Retno Kustijah |

== Medal table ==
| Rank | Nation | Gold | Silver | Bronze | Total |
|---|---|---|---|---|---|
| 1 | Indonesia (INA) | 2 | 2 | 5 | 9 |
| 2 | Malaysia (MAL) | 2 | 2 | 0 | 4 |
| 3 | Japan (JPN) | 2 | 1 | 4 | 7 |
| 4 | Thailand (THA) | 1 | 2 | 2 | 5 |
| 5 | Burma (BIR) | 0 | 0 | 1 | 1 |
| 5 | Republic of China (ROC) | 0 | 0 | 1 | 1 |
| 5 | South Korea (KOR) | 0 | 0 | 1 | 1 |
| Totals (7 entries) | | 7 | 7 | 14 | 28 |

== Semifinal results ==
| Discipline | Winner | Runner-up | Score |
|---|---|---|---|
| Men's singles | (Indonesia) Ang Tjin Siang | (Japan) Masao Akiyama | 15–2, 15–5 |
| Men's singles | (Indonesia) Wong Pek Sen | (Myanmar) Kyi Nyunt | 15–8, 15–3 |
| Women's singles | (Japan) Noriko Takagi | (Indonesia) Minarni | 11–1, 11–7 |
| Women's singles | (Thailand) Sumol Chanklum | (Japan) Tomoko Takahashi | 12–9, 8–11, 11–4 |
| Men's doubles | (Malaysia) Ng Boon Bee (Malaysia) Tan Yee Khan | (Indonesia) Tan King Gwan (Indonesia) Abdul Patah Unang | 15–7, 15–9 |
| Men's doubles | (Indonesia) Ang Tjin Siang (Indonesia) Tjoa Tjong Boan | (Thailand) Charoen Wattanasin (Thailand) Tuly Ulao | 11–15, 15–7, 15–10 |
| Women's doubles | (Japan) Hiroe Amano (Japan) Tomoko Takahashi | (Thailand) Achara Pattabongs (Thailand) Pratuang Pattabongs | 11–15, 17–16, 15–4 |
| Women's doubles | (Indonesia) Minarni (Indonesia) Retno Kustijah | (Japan) Noriko Takagi (Japan) Kazuko Goto | 15–5, 15–11 |
| Mixed doubles | (Malaysia) Eddy Choong (Malaysia) Tan Gaik Bee | (Indonesia) Tjoa Tjong Boan (Indonesia) Retno Kustijah | 6–15, 17–16, 15–9 |
| Mixed doubles | (Malaysia) Teh Kew San (Malaysia) Rosalind Singha Ang | (Indonesia) Wong Pek Sen (Indonesia) Minarni | 3–15, 15–8, 15–6 |

== Final results ==
| Discipline | Winner | Finalist | Score |
|---|---|---|---|
| Men's singles | (Indonesia) Ang Tjin Siang | (Indonesia) Wong Pek Sen | 5–3 retired |
| Women's singles | (Japan) Noriko Takagi | (Thailand) Sumol Chanklum | 11–0, 11–4 |
| Men's doubles | (Malaysia) Ng Boon Bee (Malaysia) Tan Yee Khan | (Indonesia) Ang Tjin Siang (Indonesia) Tjoa Tjong Boan | 12–15, 15–8, 18–16 |
| Women's doubles | (Indonesia) Minarni (Indonesia) Retno Kustijah | (Japan) Hiroe Amano (Japan) Tomoko Takahashi | 15–9, 15–6 |
| Mixed doubles | (Malaysia) Teh Kew San (Malaysia) Rosalind Singha Ang | (Malaysia) Eddy Choong (Malaysia) Tan Gaik Bee | 18–13, 11–15, 15–5 |
| Men's team | Thailand | Malaysia | 5—4 |
| Women's team | Japan | Thailand | 4—3 |
