= 1966 Asian Games medal table =

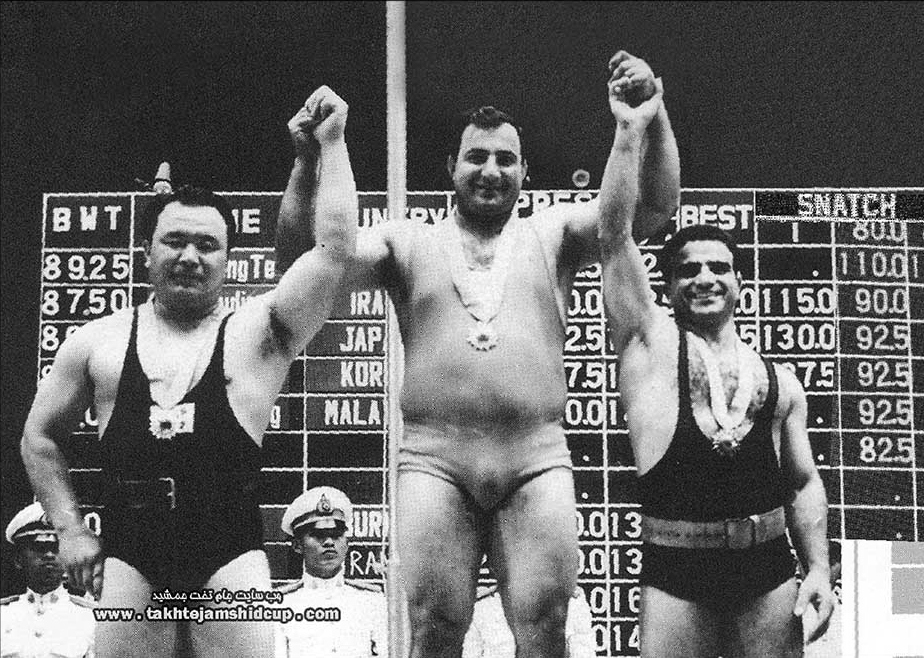
- Hwang Ho-dong, Manouchehr Boroumand, Reza Esteki at the 1966 Asian Games (heavyweight weightlifting)
- Location: Bangkok, Thailand

Highlights
- Most gold medals: Japan 78
- Most total medals: Japan 164
- Medalling NOCs: 16

The 1966 Asian Games medal table is a list of nations ranked by the medals won by their athletes during the multi-sport event, being held in Bangkok, Thailand from December 9, 1966, to December 20, 1966. The National Olympic Committees are ranked by number of gold medals first, with number of silver then bronze medals acting as the rank decider in the event of equal standing. Other alternative methods of ranking include listing by total medals.

== Medal table ==
* Host nation (Thailand)

Rank	Nation	Gold	Silver	Bronze	Total
1	Japan (JPN)	78	53	33	164
2	South Korea (KOR)	12	18	21	51
3	Thailand (THA)*	12	14	11	37
4	Malaysia (MAL)	7	5	6	18
5	India (IND)	7	3	11	21
6	Iran (IRN)	6	8	17	31
7	Indonesia (INA)	5	5	12	22
8	Republic of China (ROC)	5	4	10	19
9	Israel (ISR)	3	5	3	11
10	Philippines (PHI)	2	15	25	42
11	Pakistan (PAK)	2	4	2	8
12	Burma (BIR)	1	0	4	5
13	Singapore (SIN)	0	5	7	12
14	South Vietnam (VNM)	0	1	1	2
15	Ceylon (CEY)	0	0	6	6
16	Hong Kong (HKG)	0	0	1	1
Totals (16 entries)		140	140	170	450
