= Manouchehr Boroumand =

Iranian weightlifter (1934–2017)

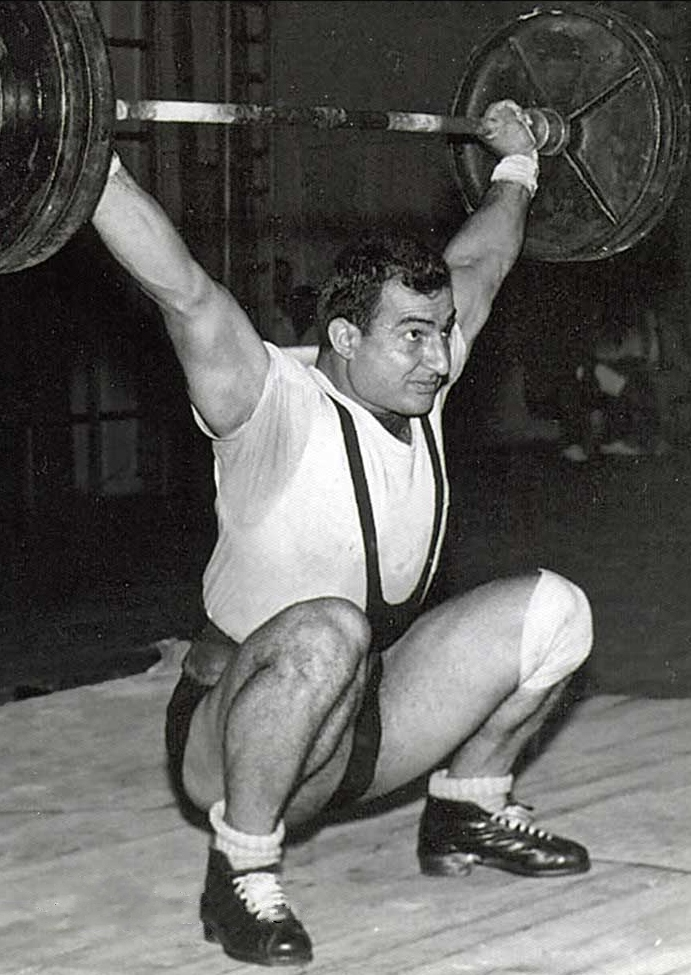

Personal information
- Born: 26 March 1934 Babolsar, Iran
- Died: 21 December 2017 (aged 83) Babolsar, Iran
- Height: 175 cm (5 ft 9 in)
- Weight: 110 kg (243 lb)

Sport
- Sport: Weightlifting
Medal record
Representing Iran
Asian Games
Gold medal – first place	1966 Bangkok	+90 kg

Manouchehr Boroumand (Persian: منوچهر برومند, 26 March 1934 – 21 December 2017) was an Iranian heavyweight weightlifter. He was selected for the 1960 Summer Olympics, but withdrew in the last moment due to an illness; he also missed the 1962 Asian Games because Iran did not send a delegation there. At the 1964 Summer Olympics he placed 12th. Boroumand has his best achievements in 1966, when he won a gold medal at the Asian Games and became the first Asian weightlifter to cross the 500 kg barrier in the total, which he has done at the world championships. Domestically he held the Iranian heavyweight title between 1961 and 1968.

Boroumand married in September 1963 and had three children. He retired from competitions around 1968, and from 1972 to 1980 trained the national weightlifting team. In 1976 he received a degree in coaching from the Polish Sports Academy. Between 1979 and 1985 he headed the Iran Weightlifting Federation.
