= Manjit Walia =

Indian hurdler

Personal information
- Nationality: Indian

Sport
- Country: India
- Sport: Athletics
Medal record
Women's athletics
Representing India
Asian Games
Bronze medal – third place	1966 Bangkok	80 m hurdles

Manjit Kaur Walia is an Indian athlete. She won a bronze medal in 80 Metres hurdles in 1966 Asian Games.
