= Nasser Aghaei =

Iranian boxer (1944–2009)

Personal information
- Born: January 20, 1944 Tehran, Iran
- Died: December 27, 2009 (aged 65) Tehran, Iran
Medal record
Representing Iran
Men's boxing
Asian Games
Bronze medal – third place	1966 Bangkok	57 kg
Asian Championships
Gold medal – first place	1963 Bangkok	51 kg
Bronze medal – third place	1967 Colombo	57 kg

Nasser Aghaie (Persian: ناصر آقایی; January 20, 1944 in Tehran – December 27, 2009 in Tehran) was an Iranian boxer who became a member of Iran senior national Boxing team in 1963. He participated as a member of this team at the first Asian Amateur Boxing Championships in Bangkok, Thailand in 1963, and at the 1964 Summer Olympics, in the Flyweight division, and at 1966 Asian Games, in the Featherweight division, and also at the third Asian Amateur Boxing Championships in Colombo, Ceylon in 1967.

== Boxing career ==
Aghaei made his national debut with the Iranian boxing team in an official international tournament, in the Asian Amateur Boxing Championships in Bangkok 1963, and won the gold medal of the 51 kg boxing division, after defeating Masao Karasawa on points, in the final, becoming the first Iranian boxer to win a gold medal. In the Asian Games in Bangkok 1966, Aghaie won the bronze medal of the 57 kg boxing division. He won the bronze medal of the 57 kg boxing division in the Asian Amateur Boxing Championships in Colombo 1967; his last Asian medal, making him one of the most decorated Iranian boxers of all time.
