= South Korea at the 1966 Asian Games =

- IOC code: KOR
- NOC: Korean Olympic Committee

in Bangkok
- Competitors: 181 in 14 sports
- Flag bearer: Kim Chang-Hee
- Officials: 52
- Medals Ranked 2nd: Gold 12 Silver 18 Bronze 21 Total 51

Asian Games appearances (overview)
- 1954; 1958; 1962; 1966; 1970; 1974; 1978; 1982; 1986; 1990; 1994; 1998; 2002; 2006; 2010; 2014; 2018; 2022; 2026

South Korea (IOC designation:Korea) participated in the 1966 Asian Games held in Bangkok, Thailand from December 9, 1966 to December 20, 1966. It won 12 gold, 18 silver and 21 bronze medals.

== Medal summary ==
=== Medal table ===
Sport	Gold	Silver	Bronze	Total
Boxing	5	3	1	9
Shooting	3	4	1	8
Weightlifting	2	3	2	7
Table tennis	1	3	5	9
Cycling	1	2	2	5
Volleyball	0	2	0	2
Athletics	0	1	3	4
Swimming	0	0	2	2
Wrestling	0	0	2	2
Badminton	0	0	1	1
Basketball	0	0	1	1
Tennis	0	0	1	1
Totals (12 entries)	12	18	21	51

=== Medalists ===
Medal	Name	Sport	Event
Gold	Son Yeong-Chan	Boxing	Men's Flyweight (-51 kg)
Gold	Kim Seong-Eun	Boxing	Men's Featherweight (-57 kg)
Gold	Park Gu-Il	Boxing	Men's Welterweight (-67 kg)
Gold	Lee Hong-Man	Boxing	Men's Light-Middleweight (-71 kg)
Gold	Kim Deok-Pal	Boxing	Men's Light-Heavyweight (-81 kg)
Gold	Ahn Byeong-Hoon, Cho Sung-Hwan, Lee Seon-Bae, Ahn Kwang-San	Cycling	Men's 200 km Team road race
Gold	Chu Hwa-Il	Shooting	Men's 50 m Rifle prone
Gold	Ahn Jae-Song, Go Min-Joon, Park O-Joon, Park Nam-Kyu	Shooting	Men's 25 m center-fire pistol, team
Gold	Ahn Jae-Song, Seo Kang-Wook, Kim Yong, Go Min-Joon	Shooting	Men's 50 m pistol, team
Gold	Kim Choong-Yong	Table tennis	Men's single
Gold	Lee Jong-Seob	Weightlifting	Men's Light-heavyweight (-82.5 kg)
Gold	Lee Hyeong-Woo	Weightlifting	Men's Middle-heavyweight (-90 kg)
Silver	Han Myeong-Hee	Athletics	Women's 400 m
Silver	Seo Sang-Yeong	Boxing	Men's Light-Flyweight (-48 kg)
Silver	Lee Mun-Woong	Boxing	Men's Lightweight (-60 kg)
Silver	Lee Geum-Taek	Boxing	Men's Middleweight (-75 kg)
Silver	Ahn Byeong-Hoon	Cycling	Men's Individual road race
Silver	Ahn Byeong-Hoon, Cho Sung-Hwan, Lee Seon-Bae, Song Woo-Hyun	Cycling	Men's 100 km Team road race
Silver	Nam Sang-Wan	Shooting	Men's 10 m air rifle
Silver	Seo Kang-Wook	Shooting	Men's 50 m pistol
Silver	South Korea	Shooting	Men's 10 m air rifle, team
Silver	South Korea	Shooting	Men's 50 m Rifle prone, team
Silver	Choi Jeong-Suk, No Hwa-Ja	Table tennis	Women's double
Silver	Kim Choong-Yong, Yoon Ki-Suk	Table tennis	Mixed double
Silver	Yoon Ki-Suk, No Hwa-Ja, Choi Jeong-Suk, Chung Hae-Ok	Table tennis	Women's team
Silver	Lee Chun-Sik	Weightlifting	Men's Middleweight (-75 kg)
Silver	Ahn Jong-Cheol	Weightlifting	Men's Featherweight (-60 kg)
Silver	Hwang Ho-Dong	Weightlifting	Men's Heavyweight (+90 kg)
Silver	Chung Seon-Heung, Lim Tae-Ho, Kim Yeong-Hwan, Kim Yeong-Nam, Kim Yeong-Dae, Chung Gwang-Su, Kim Jin-Hee, Kim Seong-Kil, Oh Chan-Seok, Jin Jeol-Tak, Park Seo-Gwang, Choi Jong-Ok	Volleyball	Men's competition
Silver	Kim Goon-Ja, Chung Myeong-Ja, Seo Hee-Suk, Choi Jeong-Suk, Mun Gyeong-Suk, Yoo Chun-Ja, Lee Geun-Su, Hong Nam-Seon, Heo Ju-Ok, Hwang Gyu-Ok, Yang Jin-Ho, Lee Chun-Il	Volleyball	Women's competition
Bronze	Lee Sang-Hoon	Athletics	Men's marathon
Bronze	Hong Sang-Pyo	Athletics	Men's pole vault
Bronze	Han Dong-Si	Athletics	Women's discus throw
Bronze	Lee Yeong-Soon, Kang Yeong-Sin	Badminton	Women's doubles
Bronze	Kim Mu-Hyeon, Lee In-Pyo, Shin Hyeon-Su, Park Han, Kim Chul-Gab, Lee Byeong-Gu, Kim Yeong-Il, Kim In-Geon, Ha Eui-Geon, Shin Dong-Pa, Choi Jong-Gyu, Lee Byeong-Guk	Basketball	Men's competition
Bronze	Lee Chun-In	Boxing	Men's Heavyweight (+81 kg)
Bronze	Kim Jeong-Gil, Kim Kwang-Seon, Kwon Joong-Hyun, Seo Jeong-Seob	Cycling	Men's Team pursuit
Bronze	Kim Jeong-Gil, Kim Kwang-Seon, Shin Dong-In	Cycling	Men's Team sprint
Bronze	Song Jae-Woong	Diving	Men's 10 m platform
Bronze	Kim Yeong-Chae	Diving	Women's 10 m platform
Bronze	Bae Byeong-Gi, Chu Hwa-Il, Nam Sang-Wan, Song Ju-Chae	Shooting	Men's 50 m rifle three positions, team
Bronze	Yoon Ki-Suk	Table tennis	Women's single
Bronze	Choi Jeong-Suk	Table tennis	Women's single
Bronze	Ju Chang-Seok, Kim Choong-Yong, Kim Ji-Hwa, Park Joong-Kil	Table tennis	Men's team
Bronze	Kim Choong-Yong, Park Joong-Kil	Table tennis	Men's double
Bronze	South Korea	Table tennis	Mixed double
Bronze	Won Sin-Hee	Weightlifting	Men's Lightweight (-67.5 kg)
Bronze	Yoo In-Ho	Weightlifting	Men's Bantamweight (-56 kg)
Bronze	Yang Jeong-soon, Park Jong-bok	Tennis	Women's double
Bronze	Seo Yong-Seok	Wrestling	Men's Freestyle Welterweight (-78 kg)
Bronze	Jang Kyeong-Mu	Wrestling	Men's Freestyle Featherweight (-63 kg)
