= Su Sang-young =

Korean male boxer

Personal information
- Nationality: South Korean
- Born: 13 March 1945 (age 80); Geoje, Korea

Sport
- Sport: Boxing

Su Sang-young (born 13 March 1945) is a South Korean boxer. He competed in the men's flyweight event at the 1968 Summer Olympics.
