= India at the 1966 Asian Games =

- IOC code: IND
- NOC: Indian Olympic Association

in Bangkok
- Medals Ranked 5th: Gold 7 Silver 3 Bronze 11 Total 21

Asian Games appearances (overview)
- 1951; 1954; 1958; 1962; 1966; 1970; 1974; 1978; 1982; 1986; 1990; 1994; 1998; 2002; 2006; 2010; 2014; 2018; 2022; 2026

India participated in the 1966 Asian Games—the fifth Asian Games, held in the Bangkok, Thailand from 9 to 20 December 1966. Indian athletes won total 21 medals with 7 golds and ranked fifth in a medal table.

== Medals by sport ==
Sport	Gold	Silver	Bronze	Total
Athletics	5	1	5	11
Boxing	1	1	0	2
Hockey	1	0	0	1
Tennis	0	0	1	1
Wrestling	0	1	5	6
Total	7	3	11	21

== Football ==
Head coach: (India) Mohammed Hussain

No.	Pos.	Player	Date of birth (age)	Caps	Goals	Club
	GK	Peter Thangaraj	24 December 1935 (aged 30)			(All India Football Federation) East Bengal
	GK	C Mustafa				(All India Football Federation) Mohammedan Sporting
	DF	Jarnail Singh (c)	20 February 1936 (aged 30)			(All India Football Federation) Mohun Bagan
	DF	Chandreswar Prasad				(All India Football Federation) Bengal
	DF	Syed Nayeemuddin				(All India Football Federation) Bengal
	DF	Arun Ghosh	7 July 1941 (aged 25)			(All India Football Federation) Bengal
	DF	Altaf Ahmed				(All India Football Federation) East Bengal
	MF	Kajal Mukherjee				(All India Football Federation) Bengal
	MF	Yousuf Khan	5 August 1937 (aged 29)			(All India Football Federation) Andhra Pradesh
	MF	Prasanta Sinha				(All India Football Federation) Bengal
	MF	Krisnaji Rao				(All India Football Federation) Mysore
	FW	Ashok Chatterjee				(All India Football Federation) Bengal
	FW	Pradip Kumar Banerjee	23 June 1936 (aged 30)			(All India Football Federation) Railways
	FW	Inder Singh	23 December 1943 (aged 22)			(All India Football Federation) Leaders Club
	FW	Arumai Nayagam				(All India Football Federation) Mohun Bagan
	FW	Parimal Dey	4 May 1941 (aged 25)			(All India Football Federation) East Bengal
	FW	P. Kannan				(All India Football Federation) Bengal

=== Preliminary round ===
Team	Pld	W	D	L	GF	GA	GAV	Pts
Japan	3	3	0	0	6	2	3.000	6
Iran	3	2	0	1	7	4	1.750	4
India	3	1	0	2	4	7	0.571	2
Malaysia	3	0	0	3	1	5	0.200	0

10 December

Japan	2–1	India
Teruki Myamoto 50', 53'	Report	Ashok Chatterjee 48'

Chulalongkorn University Stadium, Bangkok
Attendance: 10,000

12 December

Malaysia	1–2	India
		Inder Singh; Jarnail Singh (pen.)

Bangkok

13 December

India	1–4	Iran
Jarnail Singh

Bangkok
