= Park Koo-il =

South Korean male boxer (1944–1984)

Personal information
- Native name: 박수일
- Nationality: South Korean
- Born: 15 March 1944 Kyosaishi, Keishōnando, Korea
- Died: 1984 (aged 39–40)

Sport
- Sport: Boxing

Park Koo-il (15 March 1944 – 1984) was a South Korean boxer. He competed at the 1964 Summer Olympics and the 1968 Summer Olympics.
