= Indonesia at the 1966 Asian Games =

- IOC code: INA
- NOC: Indonesian Olympic Committee
- Website: www.nocindonesia.or.id (in English)

in Bangkok
- Medals Ranked 7th: Gold 5 Silver 5 Bronze 12 Total 22

Asian Games appearances (overview)
- 1951; 1954; 1958; 1962; 1966; 1970; 1974; 1978; 1982; 1986; 1990; 1994; 1998; 2002; 2006; 2010; 2014; 2018; 2022; 2026

Indonesia participated in the 1966 Asian Games held in Bangkok, Thailand from December 9, 1966 to December 20, 1966. It was ranked seventh in medal count, with five gold medals, five silver medals, and twelve bronze medals, for a total of twenty-two.

== Medal summary ==
=== Medal table ===
Sport	Gold	Silver	Bronze	Total
Tennis	3	0	3	6
Badminton	2	2	5	9
Boxing	0	2	0	2
Athletics	0	1	0	1
Diving	0	0	1	1
Shooting	0	0	1	1
Swimming	0	0	1	1
Water polo	0	0	1	1
Total	5	5	12	22

=== Medalists ===
Medal	Name	Sport	Event
Gold	Ang Tjin Siang	Badminton	Men's singles
Gold	Minarni; Retno Kustijah	Badminton	Women's doubles
Gold	Lany Kaligis	Tennis	Women's singles
Gold	Lita Liem; Lany Kaligis	Tennis	Women's doubles
Gold	Lany Kaligis; Lita Liem; Mien Suhadi	Tennis	Women's team
Silver	Soepardi; Agus Sugiri; Bambang Wahjudi; Jootje Oroh	Athletics	Men's 4×100 m relay
Silver	Wong Pek Sen	Badminton	Men's singles
Silver	Ang Tjin Siang; Tjoa Tjong Boan	Badminton	Men's doubles
Silver	Idwan Anwar	Boxing	Men's Flyweight (51 kg)
Silver	Said Fidal	Boxing	Men's Light welterweight (63.5 kg)
Bronze	Tan King Gwan; Abdul Patah Unang	Badminton	Men's doubles
Bronze	Minarni	Badminton	Women's singles
Bronze	Retno Kustijah; Minarni; Nurhaena; Tan Tjoen Ing	Badminton	Women's team
Bronze	Wong Pek Sen; Minarni	Badminton	Mixed doubles
Bronze	Tjoa Tjong Boan; Retno Kustijah	Badminton	Mixed doubles
Bronze	Billy Gumulya	Diving	Men's 3 m springboard
Bronze	Elias Joseph Lessy	Shooting	Men's 10 m air rifle
Bronze	Winny Han; Fay Loa; Liem Hong Ing; Enny Nuraeni	Swimming	Women's 4×100 m medley relay
Bronze	Lita Liem	Tennis	Women's singles
Bronze	Sutarjo Sugiarto; Lita Liem	Tennis	Mixed doubles
Bronze	Go Soen Houw; Lany Kaligis	Tennis	Mixed doubles
Bronze	Men's team	Water polo	Men
