= Yew Cheng Hoe =

Malaysian badminton player (born 1943)

Yew Cheng Hoe 尤清和
- Yew in the 1966 U.S. Open program

Personal information
- Born: 1943 (age 82–83) Penang, British Malaya

Sport
- Sport: Badminton
Medal record
Men's badminton
Representing Malaysia
Thomas Cup
| Gold medal – first place | 1967 Jakarta | Men's team |
Commonwealth Games
| Gold medal – first place | 1966 Kingston | Men's doubles |
| Silver medal – second place | 1966 Kingston | Men's singles |
Asian Games
| Silver medal – second place | 1966 Bangkok | Men's team |
| Bronze medal – third place | 1962 Jakarta | Men's team |
Asian Championships
| Gold medal – first place | 1962 Kuala Lumpur | Men's team |
| Gold medal – first place | 1965 Lucknow | Men's team |
| Bronze medal – third place | 1962 Kuala Lumpur | Men's singles |
Southeast Asian Games
| Gold medal – first place | 1965 Kuala Lumpur | Men's team |
| Gold medal – first place | 1969 Rangoon | Men's doubles |
| Silver medal – second place | 1969 Rangoon | Mixed doubles |
| Bronze medal – third place | 1965 Kuala Lumpur | Men's singles |
| Bronze medal – third place | 1965 Kuala Lumpur | Men's doubles |
| Bronze medal – third place | 1967 Bangkok | Men's singles |
| Bronze medal – third place | 1967 Bangkok | Men's doubles |

Datuk Yew Cheng Hoe PJN AMN (born 1943) is a former world-class Malaysian badminton player.

== Career ==
He played on the Malaysian Thomas Cup (men's international) teams of 1963-1964 and 1966-1967, the latter of which won the world championship. During the 1965-1966 tournament season Cheng Hoe was a frequent runner-up to fellow countryman Tan Aik Huang who dominated international singles competition that year. Cheng Hoe won the Malaysian Open and New Zealand Open singles titles in 1963. With Tan Aik Huang he won men's doubles at the British Commonwealth Games in 1966.

== Achievements ==
=== Asian Championships ===
Men's singles
| Year | Venue | Opponent | Score | Result |
|---|---|---|---|---|
| 1962 | Stadium Negara, Kuala Lumpur, Malaysia | (Malaysia) Billy Ng | 12–15, 12–15 | Bronze |

=== Southeast Asian Peninsular Games ===
Men's singles
| Year | Venue | Opponent | Score | Result |
|---|---|---|---|---|
| 1965 | Selangor Badminton Hall, Kuala Lumpur, Malaysia | | | Bronze |
| 1967 | Bangkok, Thailand | (Thailand) Somsook Boonyasukhanonda | 15–9, 12–15, 8–15 | Bronze |

Men's doubles
| Year | Venue | Partner | Opponent | Score | Result |
|---|---|---|---|---|---|
| 1965 | Selangor Badminton Hall, Kuala Lumpur, Malaysia | (Malaysia) Tan Aik Huang | | | Bronze |
| 1967 | Bangkok, Thailand | (Malaysia) Khor Cheng Chye | (Thailand) Narong Bhornchima (Thailand) Raphi Kanchanaraphi | 13–15, 3–15 | Bronze |
| 1969 | Yangon, Myanmar | (Malaysia) Punch Gunalan | (Thailand) Thongchai Phongful (Thailand) Singha Siribanterng | | Gold |

Mixed doubles
| Year | Venue | Partner | Opponent | Score | Result |
|---|---|---|---|---|---|
| 1969 | Yangon, Myanmar | (Malaysia) Khaw Gaik Bee | (Malaysia) Ng Boon Bee (Malaysia) Rosalind Singha Ang | | Silver |

=== Commonwealth Games ===
Men's singles
| Year | Venue | Opponent | Score | Result |
|---|---|---|---|---|
| 1966 | Kingston, Jamaica | (Malaysia) Tan Aik Huang | 8–15, 8–15 | Silver |

Men's doubles
| Year | Venue | Partner | Opponent | Score | Result |
|---|---|---|---|---|---|
| 1966 | Kingston, Jamaica | (Malaysia) Tan Aik Huang | (Malaysia) Ng Boon Bee (Malaysia) Tan Yee Khan | 15–14, 15–5 | Gold |

=== International tournaments ===
Men's singles
| Year | Tournament | Opponent | Score | Result |
|---|---|---|---|---|
| 1961 | Penang Open | (Thailand) Somsook Boonyasukhanonda | 12–15, 13–15 | (silver) Runner-up |
| 1963 | Singapore Open | (Malaysia) Teh Kew San | 15–11, 3–15, 1–15 | (silver) Runner-up |
| 1963 | Malaysia Open | (Thailand) Sangob Rattanusorn | 15–9, 15–1 | (gold) Winner |
| 1966 | Canada Open | (Malaysia) Tan Aik Huang | 11–15, 3–15 | (silver) Runner-up |
| 1966 | U.S. Open | (Malaysia) Tan Aik Huang | 5–15, 1–15 | (silver) Runner-up |
| 1966 | Singapore Open | (Indonesia) Indratno | 15–7, 15–1 | (gold) Winner |

Men's doubles
| Year | Tournament | Partner | Opponent | Score | Result |
|---|---|---|---|---|---|
| 1966 | Denmark Open | (Malaysia) Tan Aik Huang | (Malaysia) Tan Yee Khan (Malaysia) Ng Boon Bee | 13–15, 10–15 | (silver) Runner-up |
| 1966 | Canadian Open | (Denmark) Svend Pri | (Malaysia) Tan Yee Khan (Malaysia) Ng Boon Bee | 15–12, 1–15, 14–17 | (silver) Runner-up |
| 1966 | Penang Open | (Malaysia) Teh Kew San | (Indonesia) Ang Tjin Siang (Indonesia) Rudy Nio | 15–0, 15–0 | (gold) Winner |
| 1966 | Singapore Open | (Malaysia) Eddy Choong | (Malaysia) Tan Yee Khan (Malaysia) Khor Cheng Chye | 15–13, 8–15, 15–2 | (gold) Winner |

== Honours ==
- Member of the Order of the Defender of the Realm (AMN) (1972).
- Commander of the Order of Meritorious Service (PJN) – Datuk (2023).
