= Agus Susanto =

Indonesian badminton player

Sport
- Sport: Badminton
Medal record
Men's badminton
Representing Indonesia
Thomas Cup
Silver medal – second place	1967 Jakarta	Men's team
Asian Games
Silver medal – second place	1966 Bangkok	Men's doubles
Bronze medal – third place	1966 Bangkok	Mixed doubles

Agus Susanto (born 1940; as Tjoe Tjong Boen; Chinese: 蔡宗滿) is an Indonesian badminton player in the 60s.

== Career ==
Agus Susanto started his career as a badminton player at the Badminton at the 1966 Asian Games in Bangkok Thailand. At the event, he successfully brought two silver medals in the men's doubles paired with Ang Tjin Siang and bronze in the mixed doubles paired with Retno Kustijah. Agus' success at the Asian Games led him to be selected for the Indonesian men's team at the 1967 Thomas Cup in Jakarta.

== Achievements ==
=== Asian Games ===
Men's doubles
Year	Venue	Partner	Opponent	Score	Result
1966	Kittikachorn Stadium, Bangkok, Thailand	(Indonesia) Ang Tjin Siang	(Malaysia) Ng Boon Bee (Malaysia) Tan Yee Khan	15–12, 8–15, 16–18	Silver

Mixed doubles
Year	Venue	Partner	Opponent	Score	Result
1966	Kittikachorn Stadium, Bangkok, Thailand	(Indonesia) Retno Kustijah	(Malaysia) Eddy Choong (Malaysia) Tan Gaik Bee	15–6, 16–17, 9–15	Bronze

=== International tournament ===
Men's doubles
Year	Tournament	Partner	Opponent	Score	Result	Ref.
1966	Perak Open	(Indonesia) Abdul Patah Unang	(Japan) Masao Akiyama (Japan) Ippei Kojima	17–16, 15–11	(gold) Winner	

=== Other tournament ===
Men's singles
Year	Tournament	Opponent	Score	Result	Ref.
1983	Veterans Tournament (40+)	(Chinese Taipei) Ho Wen-ming	17–18, 12–15	(silver) Runner-up	
