= Japan at the 1966 Asian Games =

- IOC code: JPN
- NOC: Japanese Olympic Committee

in Bangkok
- Medals Ranked 1st: Gold 78 Silver 53 Bronze 33 Total 164

Asian Games appearances (overview)
- 1951; 1954; 1958; 1962; 1966; 1970; 1974; 1978; 1982; 1986; 1990; 1994; 1998; 2002; 2006; 2010; 2014; 2018; 2022; 2026

Japan participated in the 1966 Asian Games held in Bangkok, Thailand from December 9, 1966 to December 20, 1966. The country was ranked first with 78 gold medals, 53 silver medals and 33 bronze medals with a total of 164 medals to secure the top spot in the medal tally.
