= 1966 Asian Games =

Multi-sport event in Bangkok, Thailand

V Asian Games
- Host city: Bangkok, Thailand
- Motto: Ever Onward
- Nations: 18
- Athletes: 1,945
- Events: 142 in 16 sports
- Opening: 9 December
- Closing: 20 December
- Opened by: Bhumibol Adulyadej; King of Thailand
- Torch lighter: Suthi Manyakass
- Main venue: National Stadium

The 1966 Asian Games, also known as the V Asiad or Bangkok 1966, were a continental multi-sport event that was held from 9 to 20 December 1966, in Bangkok, Thailand. A total of 142 events in 16 sports were contested by athletes during the games. Taiwan and Israel returned to the Asian Games, reversing the decision taken by Indonesia in the previous Asiad to debar the two countries. A total number of 2,500 athletes and officials from 18 countries, were involved in this Asiad.

The 5th Asiad was the first one where women's volleyball was played.

== Venues ==
=== National Sport Complex ===
- Suphachalasai Stadium (Opening & Closing ceremonies, Athletics and Football)
- Chantanayingyong Gymnasium (Volleyball)
- Thephasadin Stadium (Hockey)
- Nimibutr Indoor Stadium (Basketball)
- Tennis Stadium (Tennis)
- Wisutarom Swimming Pool (Diving, Swimming)

=== Sport Authority of Thailand Sport Complex (Hua Mark) ===
- Indoor Stadium (formerly Kittikachorn Indoor Stadium) (Badminton and Boxing)
- Shooting Range (Shooting)
- Velodrome (Cycling)

=== Chulalongkorn University Sport Complex ===
- Chula Football Stadium (Football)
- Sala Phrakieo (Table Tennis)
- Chula Swimming Stadium (Water Polo)

=== Thammasat University (Thaprachan Centre) ===
- Thammasat Gymnasium (Volleyball)

=== Other Venues in Bangkok ===
- Cultural Hall (Weightlifting)
- Amporn Garden Hall (Wrestling)

== Participating nations ==
- Afghanistan (34)
- Burma (70)
- Ceylon (43)
- Hong Kong (21)
- India (259)
- Indonesia (257)
- Iran (254)
- Israel (90)
- Japan (296)
- Malaysia (150)
- Nepal (61)
- Pakistan (42)
- Philippines (173)
- Republic of China (306)
- Singapore (103)
- South Korea (268)
- South Vietnam (141)
- Thailand (host) (307)

Number of athletes by National Olympic Committees (by highest to lowest)

IOC Letter Code	Country	Athletes
THA	Thailand	307
ROC	Republic of China	306
JPN	Japan	296
KOR	South Korea	268
IND	India	259
INA	Indonesia	257
IRN	Iran	254
PHI	Philippines	173
MAL	Malaysia	150
VNM	South Vietnam	141
SIN	Singapore	103
ISR	Israel	90
BIR	Burma	70
NEP	Nepal	61
CEY	Ceylon	43
PAK	Pakistan	42
AFG	Afghanistan	34
HKG	Hong Kong	21

== Sports ==
- Athletics
- Badminton
- Basketball
- Boxing
- Cycling
- Diving
- Football
- Field hockey
- Shooting
- Swimming
- Table tennis
- Tennis
- Volleyball
- Water polo
- Weightlifting
- Wrestling

== Medal table ==
Japan led the medal table for the fifth consecutive time, and they gained a new record for the most gold medals in a single Asian Games since 1962 in Jakarta. The top ten ranked NOCs at these Games are listed below. The host nation, Thailand, is highlighted.

* Host nation (Thailand)

Rank	Nation	Gold	Silver	Bronze	Total
1	Japan (JPN)	78	53	33	164
2	South Korea (KOR)	12	18	21	51
3	Thailand (THA)*	12	14	11	37
4	Malaysia (MAL)	7	5	6	18
5	India (IND)	7	3	11	21
6	Iran (IRN)	6	8	17	31
7	Indonesia (INA)	5	5	12	22
8	Republic of China (ROC)	5	4	10	19
9	Israel (ISR)	3	5	3	11
10	Philippines (PHI)	2	15	25	42
11–16	Remaining	3	10	21	34
Totals (16 entries)		140	140	170	450

Preceded by Jakarta	Asian Games; Bangkok; V Asiad (1966)	Succeeded by Bangkok
