= 1989 IBF World Championships – Women's doubles =

Women's doubles at the 1989 IBF World Championships
- Venue: Istora Senayan
- Location: Jakarta, Indonesia
- Dates: 29 May – 4 June

Medalists
gold medal	Lin Ying; Guan Weizhen	China
silver medal	Chung Myung-hee; Hwang Hye-young	South Korea
bronze medal	Maria Bengtsson; Christine Magnusson	Sweden
bronze medal	Sun Xiaoqing; Zhou Lei	China

The 1989 IBF World Championships were held in Jakarta, Indonesia, in 1989. Following is the results of the women's doubles.

== Main stage ==
=== Section 1 ===
First round
(China) Lin Ying (China) Guan Weizhen	bye
(South Korea) Chun Sung-suk (South Korea) Chung So-young
bye
(Scotland) Elinor Middlemiss (Scotland) Jennifer Williamson	15	15
(New Zealand) Rhona Robertson (New Zealand) Lynne Horne	10	11
(Malaysia) Lee Wai Leng (Malaysia) Lim Siew Choon	15	15
(Nepal) Kalpana Rana Shrestha (Nepal) Subha Shrestha	0	1
(Indonesia) Erma Sulistianingsih (Indonesia) Rosiana Tendean	15	15
(Japan) Takako Shinki (Japan) Harumi Kohara	13	6
(Thailand) Penpanor Klangthamnium (Thailand) Piyathip Sansaniyakulvilai	10	18	15
(Poland) Bozena Bak (Poland) Bozena Haracz	15	16	11
(England) Gillian Clark (England) Gillian Gowers
bye
(Germany) Katrin Schmidt (Germany) Kirsten Schmieder	15	15
(United States) Erika von Heiland (United States) Meiling Okuno	0	1

Second round
(China) Lin Ying (China) Guan Weizhen	15	15
(South Korea) Chun Sung-suk (South Korea) Chung So-young	7	6
(Scotland) Elinor Middlemiss (Scotland) Jennifer Williamson	15	15
(Malaysia) Lee Wai Leng (Malaysia) Lim Siew Choon	8	4
(Indonesia) Erma Sulistianingsih (Indonesia) Rosiana Tendean	15	15
(Thailand) Penpanor Klangthamnium (Thailand) Piyathip Sansaniyakulvilai	0	5
(England) Gillian Clark (England) Gillian Gowers	12	15	15
(Germany) Katrin Schmidt (Germany) Kirsten Schmieder	15	0	7

Third round
(China) Lin Ying (China) Guan Weizhen	15	15
(Scotland) Elinor Middlemiss (Scotland) Jennifer Williamson	4	6
(Indonesia) Erma Sulistianingsih (Indonesia) Rosiana Tendean	15	15
(England) Gillian Clark (England) Gillian Gowers	8	8

Quarterfinals
(China) Lin Ying (China) Guan Weizhen	15	15
(Indonesia) Erma Sulistianingsih (Indonesia) Rosiana Tendean	12	3

=== Section 2 ===
First round
(Sweden) Maria Bengtsson (Sweden) Christine Magnusson
bye
(Netherlands) Monique Hoogland (Denmark) Lotte Olsen
(Peru) Gloria Jiménez (Finland) Nina Sundberg
(Canada) Chantal Jobin (Canada) Doris Piché
(India) Seema Bafna (India) Madhumita Bisht
(Bulgaria) Emilia Dimitrova (Bulgaria) Diana Koleva	15	15
(Austria) Sabine Ploner (Austria) Brigitte Langthaler	5	11
(Denmark) Dorte Kjær (Denmark) Nettie Nielsen
bye
(Soviet Union) Tatyana Litvinenko (Soviet Union) Irina Serova
(Japan) Aiko Miyamura (Japan) Yoko Koizumi
(South Korea) Gil Young-ah (South Korea) Kim Ho-ja	15	15
(Malaysia) Poh Chin Peng (Malaysia) Lee Yin Ling	3	5
(Australia) Lisa Campbell (Australia) Tracey Small	15	15
(France) Rosita Rios (France) Elodie Mansuy	8	10

Second round
(Sweden) Maria Bengtsson (Sweden) Christine Magnusson	15	15
(Netherlands) Monique Hoogland (Denmark) Lotte Olsen	5	6
(Canada) Chantal Jobin (Canada) Doris Piché	15	15
(Bulgaria) Emilia Dimitrova (Bulgaria) Diana Koleva	5	2
(Denmark) Dorte Kjær (Denmark) Nettie Nielsen	15	15
(Soviet Union) Tatyana Litvinenko (Soviet Union) Irina Serova	6	7
(South Korea) Gil Young-ah (South Korea) Kim Ho-ja	15	15
(Australia) Lisa Campbell (Australia) Tracey Small	2	3

Third round
(Sweden) Maria Bengtsson (Sweden) Christine Magnusson	15	15
(Canada) Chantal Jobin (Canada) Doris Piché	6	9
(Denmark) Dorte Kjær (Denmark) Nettie Nielsen	15	15
(South Korea) Gil Young-ah (South Korea) Kim Ho-ja	6	7

Quarterfinals
(Sweden) Maria Bengtsson (Sweden) Christine Magnusson	15	15
(Denmark) Dorte Kjær (Denmark) Nettie Nielsen	12	12

=== Section 3 ===
First round
(China) Sun Xiaoqing (China) Zhou Lei
bye
(Hong Kong) Amy Chan (Hong Kong) Man Wa Chan
bye
(Switzerland) Liselotte Blumer (Scotland) Anne Gibson	15	15
(Poland) Marzena Masiuk (Poland) Elżbieta Grzybek	6	9
(Germany) Nicole Baldewein (Germany) Kerstin Ubben	15	15
(France) Sandra Dimbour (France) Corinne Sonnet	9	4
(Japan) Kimiko Jinnai (Japan) Hisako Mori
(Bulgaria) Diana Filipova (Bulgaria) Anetha Stambolizska
(Indonesia) Dwi Elmyati (Indonesia) Selvie Kartenegara	15	15
(New Zealand) Toni Whittaker (New Zealand) Jane Clarke	7	10
(Netherlands) Eline Coene (Netherlands) Erica van den Heuvel
bye
(United States) Linda French (United States) Linda Safarik	15	15
(Norway) Marianne Wikdal (Norway) Ellen Berg	5	4

Second round
(China) Sun Xiaoqing (China) Zhou Lei	15	15
(Hong Kong) Amy Chan (Hong Kong) Man Wa Chan	7	6
(Switzerland) Liselotte Blumer (Scotland) Anne Gibson	15	15
(Germany) Nicole Baldewein (Germany) Kerstin Ubben	11	7
(Japan) Kimiko Jinnai (Japan) Hisako Mori	15	15
(Indonesia) Dwi Elmyati (Indonesia) Selvie Kartenegara	5	12
(Netherlands) Eline Coene (Netherlands) Erica van den Heuvel	15	15
(United States) Linda French (United States) Linda Safarik	9	2

Third round
(China) Sun Xiaoqing (China) Zhou Lei	15	15
(Switzerland) Liselotte Blumer (Scotland) Anne Gibson	9	2
(Japan) Kimiko Jinnai (Japan) Hisako Mori	15	15
(Netherlands) Eline Coene (Netherlands) Erica van den Heuvel	10	3

Quarterfinals
(China) Sun Xiaoqing (China) Zhou Lei	15	10	15
(Japan) Kimiko Jinnai (Japan) Hisako Mori	7	15	8

=== Section 4 ===
First round
(South Korea) Chung Myung-hee (South Korea) Hwang Hye-young
bye
(England) Fiona Smith (England) Helen Troke	15	15
bye
(China) Lai Caiqin (China) Yao Fen
(Pakistan) Ghazala Wadood (Pakistan) Afshan Shakeel
(New Zealand) Julie Still (New Zealand) Katrin Te Tai	15	15
(Sri Lanka) Sriyani Deepika (Sri Lanka) Kaushalya Dissanayake	1	3
(Indonesia) Verawaty Fadjrin (Indonesia) Yanti Kusmiati
bye
(Chinese Taipei) Kang Chia-yi (Chinese Taipei) Lee Chien-mei	15	15
(Malaysia) Tan Mei Chuan (Malaysia) Tan Sui Hoon	1	11
(Canada) Johanne Falardeau (Canada) Denyse Julien	15	15
(Finland) Ulrika von Pfaler (Finland) Kristiina Danskanen	8	1
(Soviet Union) Elena Rybkina (Soviet Union) Vlada Tcherniavskaia	15	15
(Mauritius) Martine de Souza (Mauritius) Cathy Foo Kune	1	0

Second round
(South Korea) Chung Myung-hee (South Korea) Hwang Hye-young	15	15
(England) Fiona Smith (England) Helen Troke	10	7
(China) Lai Caiqin (China) Yao Fen	15	15
(New Zealand) Julie Still (New Zealand) Katrin Te Tai	7	4
(Indonesia) Verawaty Fadjrin (Indonesia) Yanti Kusmiati	15	15
(Chinese Taipei) Kang Chia-yi (Chinese Taipei) Lee Chien-mei	4	4
(Canada) Johanne Falardeau (Canada) Denyse Julien	15	15
(Soviet Union) Elena Rybkina (Soviet Union) Vlada Tcherniavskaia	8	7

Third round
(South Korea) Chung Myung-hee (South Korea) Hwang Hye-young	17	15
(China) Lai Caiqin (China) Yao Fen	16	10
(Indonesia) Verawaty Fadjrin (Indonesia) Yanti Kusmiati	15	15
(Canada) Johanne Falardeau (Canada) Denyse Julien	4	2

Quarterfinals
(South Korea) Chung Myung-hee (South Korea) Hwang Hye-young	15	15
(Indonesia) Verawaty Fadjrin (Indonesia) Yanti Kusmiati	12	11

== Final stage ==
Quarterfinals
(China) Lin Ying (China) Guan Weizhen	15	15
(Indonesia) Erma Sulistyaningsih (Indonesia) Rosiana Tendean	12	3
(Sweden) Maria Bengtsson (Sweden) Christine Magnusson	15	15
(Denmark) Dorte Kjaer (Denmark) Nettie Nielsen	12	12
(China) Sun Xiaoqing (China) Zhou Lei	15	10	15
(Japan) Kimiko Jinnai (Japan) Hisako Mori	7	15	8
(South Korea) Chung Myung-hee (South Korea) Hwang Hye-young	15	15
(Indonesia) Verawaty Fajrin (Indonesia) Yanti Kusmiati	12	11

Semifinals
(China) Lin Ying (China) Guan Weizhen	15	15
(Sweden) Maria Bengtsson (Sweden) Christine Magnusson	2	3
(South Korea) Chung Myung-hee (South Korea) Hwang Hye-young	13	15	15
(China) Sun Xiaoqing (China) Zhou Lei	15	1	4

Finals
(China) Lin Ying (China) Guan Weizhen	15	15
(South Korea) Chung Myung-hee (South Korea) Hwang Hye-young	1	7
