= Badminton at the 1990 Asian Games – Women's doubles =

Women's doubles at the 1990 Asian Games
- Venue: Beijing Gymnasium
- Dates: 2–6 October
- Competitors: 24 from 7 nations

Medalists
gold medal	Guan Weizhen; Nong Qunhua	China
silver medal	Chung So-young; Gil Young-ah	South Korea
bronze medal	Verawaty Fadjrin; Lili Tampi	Indonesia
bronze medal	Yao Fen; Lai Caiqin	China

The badminton women's doubles tournament at the 1990 Asian Games in Beijing Sports Complex, Beijing, China took place from 2 October to 6 October.

The Chinese duo of Guan Weizhen and Nong Qunhua won the gold medal in this tournament after beating a South Korean pair in the final 2–0.

Indonesia and another team from China shared the bronze medal.

== Schedule ==
All times are China Standard Time (UTC+08:00)

Date	Time	Event
Tuesday, 2 October 1990	13:00	1st round
Thursday, 4 October 1990	13:00	Quarterfinals
Friday, 5 October 1990	13:00	Semifinals
Saturday, 6 October 1990	13:00	Final

== Results ==
1st round
Afshan Shakeel (PAK); Ghazala Wadood (PAK)	5	4
Guan Weizhen (CHN); Nong Qunhua (CHN)	15	15
Somharuthai Jaroensiri (THA); Pornsawan Plungwech (THA)	3	0
Verawaty Fadjrin (INA); Lili Tampi (INA)	15	15
Kimiko Jinnai (JPN); Hisako Mori (JPN)	14	15	4
Chung So-young (KOR); Gil Young-ah (KOR)	17	12	15
Yao Fen (CHN); Lai Caiqin (CHN)	15	15
Plernta Boonyarit (THA); Ladawan Mulasartsatorn (THA)	1	12

Quarterfinals
1	Chung Myung-hee (KOR); Hwang Hye-young (KOR)	15	11	12
Guan Weizhen (CHN); Nong Qunhua (CHN)	9	15	15
3/4	Tomomi Matsuo (JPN); Kyoko Sasage (JPN)	5	8
Verawaty Fadjrin (INA); Lili Tampi (INA)	15	15
Chung So-young (KOR); Gil Young-ah (KOR)	15	15
3/4	Cheng Yin Sat (HKG); Chui Mei Yin (HKG)	4	3
Yao Fen (CHN); Lai Caiqin (CHN)	15	5	15
2	Erma Sulistianingsih (INA); Rosiana Tendean (INA)	10	15	4

Semifinals
Guan Weizhen (CHN); Nong Qunhua (CHN)	15	15
Verawaty Fadjrin (INA); Lili Tampi (INA)	8	4
Chung So-young (KOR); Gil Young-ah (KOR)	15	15
Yao Fen (CHN); Lai Caiqin (CHN)	8	10

Finals
Guan Weizhen (CHN); Nong Qunhua (CHN)	15	15
Chung So-young (KOR); Gil Young-ah (KOR)	11	4
