= Lin Yanfen =

Chinese badminton player

Lin Yanfen 林燕芬
Personal information
- Born: 4 January 1971 (age 55) Xinhui, Guangdong, China
- Height: 161 cm (5 ft 3 in)
- Weight: 62 kg (137 lb)

Sport
- Country: China
- Sport: Badminton
- Handedness: Right
Medal record
Women's badminton
Representing China
Olympic Games
Bronze medal – third place	1992 Barcelona	Women's doubles
World Cup
Gold medal – first place	1992 Guangzhou	Women's doubles
Bronze medal – third place	1993 New Delhi	Women's doubles
Sudirman Cup
Bronze medal – third place	1993 Birmingham	Mixed team
Uber Cup
Gold medal – first place	1992 Kuala Lumpur	Women's team
Asian Cup
Bronze medal – third place	1991 Jakarta	Women's doubles

Lin Yanfen (Chinese: 林燕芬; born 4 January 1971) is a Chinese badminton player of the 1990s.

== Career ==
Lin was a women's doubles specialist who paired with Yao Fen to win several top tier international tournaments. These included the Swedish (1992), China (1992), and French (1993) Opens, the Badminton World Cup (1992), the World Badminton Grand Prix (1992), and the prestigious All-England Championships in 1992. Lin and Yao were bronze medalists at the 1992 Barcelona Olympics and runners-up at the 1993 All Englands. Lin was a member of China's winning Uber Cup (women's international) team of 1992.

== Achievements ==
=== Olympic Games ===
Women's doubles
Year	Venue	Partner	Opponent	Score	Result
1992	Pavelló de la Mar Bella; Barcelona, Spain	(China) Yao Fen	(South Korea) Chung So-young (South Korea) Hwang Hye-young	9–15, 8–15	Bronze

=== World Cup ===
Women's doubles
Year	Venue	Partner	Opponent	Score	Result
1992	Guangdong Gymnasium; Guangzhou, China	(China) Yao Fen	(England) Gillian Gowers (England) Sara Sankey	15–0, 15–3	Gold
1993	Indira Gandhi Indoor Stadium; New Delhi, India	(China) Yao Fen	(South Korea) Chung So-young (South Korea) Gil Young-ah	9–15, 10–15	Bronze

=== Asian Cup ===
Women's doubles
Year	Venue	Partner	Opponent	Score	Result
1991	Istora Senayan; Jakarta, Indonesia	(China) Yao Fen	(Japan) Kimiko Jinnai (Japan) Hisako Mori	15–10, 14–17, 1–15	Bronze

=== IBF World Grand Prix (5 titles, 4 runners-up) ===
The World Badminton Grand Prix sanctioned by International Badminton Federation (IBF) from 1983 to 2006.

Women's doubles
Year	Tournament	Partner	Opponent	Score	Result
1991	German Open	(China) Yao Fen	(Sweden) Lim Xiaoqing (Sweden) Christine Magnusson	11–15, 15–17	(silver) Runner-Up
1992	Swedish Open	(China) Yao Fen	(Sweden) Catrine Bengtsson (Sweden) Maria Bengtsson	15–6, 17–16	(gold) Winner
1992	All England Open	(China) Yao Fen	(China) Guan Weizhen (China) Nong Qunhua	18–14, 18–17	(gold) Winner
1992	China Open	(China) Yao Fen	(China) Pan Li (China) Wu Yuhong	17–14, 15–4	(gold) Winner
1992	Grand Prix Finals	(China) Yao Fen	(England) Gillian Clark (England) Gillian Gowers	15–7, 17–16	(gold) Winner
1993	Korea Open	(China) Yao Fen	(South Korea) Chung So-young (South Korea) Gil Young-ah	8–15, 5–15	(silver) Runner-Up
1993	All England Open	(China) Yao Fen	(South Korea) Chung So-young (South Korea) Gil Young-ah	15–5, 4–15, 7–15	(silver) Runner-Up
1993	French Open	(China) Yao Fen	(China) Nong Qunhua (China) Zhou Lei	15–10, 17–15	(gold) Winner
1993	China Open	(China) Pan Li	(China) Chen Ying (China) Wu Yuhong	15–4, 12–15, 4–15	(silver) Runner-Up

=== IBF International (5 titles, 1 runner-up) ===
Women's singles
Year	Tournament	Opponent	Score	Result
1988	Polish International	(South Korea) Lee Young-suk	0–11, 1–11	(silver) Runner-up
1988	Bulgarian International	(China) Zhang Wanling	9–12, 11–4, 11–3	(gold) Winner
1989	Bulgarian International	(Belarus) Vlada Tcherniavskaia	11–7, 11–8	(gold) Winner

Women's doubles
Year	Tournament	Partner	Opponent	Score	Result
1988	Bulgarian International	(China) Zhang Wanling	(China) Zhang Junying (China) Gao Meifeng	15–7, 6–15, 18–15	(gold) Winner
1989	Bulgarian International	(China) Zhang Wanling	(Bulgaria) Diana Koleva (Belarus) Vlada Tcherniavskaia	15–6, 15–4	(gold) Winner

Mixed doubles
Year	Tournament	Partner	Opponent	Score	Result
1989	Bulgarian International	(China) Wu Chibing	(Poland) Jerzy Dolhan (Poland) Bozena Haracz	17–14, 15–11	(gold) Winner
