= Kim Hak-kyun (badminton) =

South Korean badminton player

Personal information
- Born: 15 November 1971 (age 54)
- Height: 1.73 m (5 ft 8 in)

Sport
- Sport: Badminton
- Handedness: Right

Men's singles & doubles
- Career record: 148 wins, 80 losses
Medal record
Men's badminton
Representing South Korea
World Cup
Bronze medal – third place	1991 Macau	Mixed doubles
Sudirman Cup
Gold medal – first place	1991 Copenhagen	Mixed team
Gold medal – first place	1993 Birmingham	Mixed team
Bronze medal – third place	1995 Lausanne	Mixed team
Thomas Cup
Bronze medal – third place	1992 Kuala Lumpur	Men's team
Bronze medal – third place	1994 Jakarta	Men's team
Asian Games
Silver medal – second place	1994 Hiroshima	Men's team
Bronze medal – third place	1994 Hiroshima	Men's singles
Asian Championships
Bronze medal – third place	1989 Shanghai	Men's team

Korean name
- Hangul: 김학균
- RR: Gim Hakgyun
- MR: Kim Hakkyun

Kim Hak-kyun (Korean: 김학균; born 15 November 1971) is a retired male badminton player from South Korea.

== Career ==
Kim competed in badminton at the 1992 Summer Olympics in men's singles. He lost in quarterfinals to Alan Budikusuma, of Indonesia, 15-9, 15-4. After retiring, he spent many years as a national team coach and in mid-2015, he became Head Coach of the Korean junior national badminton team.

== Achievements ==
=== World Cup ===
Mixed doubles

Year	Venue	Partner	Opponent	Score	Result
1991	Macau Forum, Macau	(South Korea) Hwang Hye-young	(Indonesia) Rudy Gunawan (Indonesia) Rosiana Tendean	8–15, 9–15	Bronze

=== Asian Games ===
Men's singles

Year	Venue	Opponent	Score	Result
1994	Tsuru Memorial Gymnasium, Hiroshima, Japan	(Indonesia) Joko Suprianto	6–15, 5–15	Bronze

=== IBF World Grand Prix ===
The World Badminton Grand Prix sanctioned by International Badminton Federation (IBF) from 1983 to 2006.

Men's singles

Year	Tournament	Opponent	Score	Result
1995	Swedish Open	(South Korea) Park Sung-woo	18–17, 3–15, 4–15	(silver) Runner-up
1995	Thailand Open	(China) Dong Jiong	13–15, 7–15	(silver) Runner-up
1996	Korea Open	(South Korea) Lee Kwang-jin	15–5, 15–5	(gold) Winner

Mixed doubles

Year	Tournament	Partner	Opponent	Score	Result
1989	China Open	(South Korea) Hwang Hye-young	(Hong Kong) Chan Chi Choi (Hong Kong) Amy Chan	18–13, 15–5	(gold) Winner
