= 1991 Sudirman Cup =

Tournament details
- Dates: 30 April – 04 May
- Edition: 2nd
- Venue: Brøndbyhallen
- Location: Copenhagen, Denmark

The 1991 Sudirman Cup was the second tournament of the World Mixed Team Badminton Championships. It was held from April 30 to May 4, 1991, in Copenhagen, Denmark.

== Results ==
Nigeria and Pakistan also entered, but ultimately did not participate.

=== Group 1 ===
==== Subgroup A ====
Team one	Team two	Score
China	Sweden	3–2
Indonesia	Sweden	4–1
Indonesia	China	3–2

China
3
Copenhagen, Denmark
1 May 1991

Sweden
2

			1	2	3
1	(China) (Sweden)	Huang Hua; Christine Magnusson	11; 2	11; 7
2	(China) (Sweden)	Wu Wenkai; Jens Olsson	11; 15	8; 15
3	(China) (Sweden)	Guan Weizhen / Nong Qunhua; Maria Bengtsson / Christine Magnusson	15; 8	15; 1
4	(China) (Sweden)	Li Yongbo / Tian Bingyi; Peter Axelsson / Pär-Gunnar Jönsson	15; 13	15; 8
5	(China) (Sweden)	Zheng Yumin / Lai Caiqin; Pär-Gunnar Jönsson / Maria Bengtsson	6; 15	9; 15

Indonesia
4
Copenhagen, Denmark
2 May 1991

Sweden
1

			1	2	3
1	(Indonesia) (Sweden)	Rudy Gunawan / Rosiana Tendean; Pär-Gunnar Jönsson / Maria Bengtsson	15; 8	15; 9
2	(Indonesia) (Sweden)	Susi Susanti; Christine Magnusson	11; 3	11; 3
3	(Indonesia) (Sweden)	Ardy Wiranata; Jens Olsson	15; 13	18; 13
4	(Indonesia) (Sweden)	Rudy Gunawan / Eddy Hartono; Peter Axelsson / Pär-Gunnar Jönsson	15; 6	15; 8
5	(Indonesia) (Sweden)	Erma Sulistianingsih / Rosiana Tendean; Maria Bengtsson / Christine Magnusson	8; 15	11; 15

Indonesia
3
Copenhagen, Denmark
3 May 1991

China
2

			1	2	3
1	(Indonesia) (China)	Eddy Hartono / Erma Sulistianingsih; Zheng Yumin / Pan Li	15; 8	15; 7
2	(Indonesia) (China)	Susi Susanti; Tang Jiuhong	6; 11	11; 7	11; 1
3	(Indonesia) (China)	Ardy Wiranata; Zhao Jianhua	7; 15	17; 16	15; 8
4	(Indonesia) (China)	Erma Sulistianingsih / Rosiana Tendean; Guan Weizhen / Nong Qunhua	14; 15	3; 15
5	(Indonesia) (China)	Rudy Gunawan / Eddy Hartono; Li Yongbo / Tian Bingyi	14; 17	8; 15

==== Subgroup B ====
Team one	Team two	Score
Denmark	Japan	4–1
South Korea	Japan	5–0
South Korea	Denmark	4–1

Denmark
4
Copenhagen, Denmark
1 May 1991

Japan
1

			1	2	3
1	(Denmark) (Japan)	Jon Holst-Christensen / Thomas Lund; Shuji Matsuno / Shinji Matsuura	15; 12	15; 4
2	(Denmark) (Japan)	Poul-Erik Høyer Larsen; Hiroki Eto	15; 5	15; 11
3	(Denmark) (Japan)	Pernille Nedergaard; Hisako Mizui	8; 11	11; 8	10; 12
4	(Denmark) (Japan)	Dorte Kjær / Nettie Nielsen; Kimiko Jinnai / Hisako Mori	15; 3	13; 15	15; 9
5	(Denmark) (Japan)	Thomas Lund / Pernille Dupont; Koji Miya / Hisako Mori	15; 2	15; 4

South Korea
5
Copenhagen, Denmark
2 May 1991

Japan
0

			1	2	3
1	(South Korea) (Japan)	Bang Soo-hyun; Aiko Miyamura	11; 5	11; 1
2	(South Korea) (Japan)	Kim Hak-kyun; Hiroki Eto	15; 4	15; 6
3	(South Korea) (Japan)	Chung So-young / Hwang Hye-young; Kimiko Jinnai / Hisako Mori	15; 3	15; 9
4	(South Korea) (Japan)	Kim Moon-soo / Park Joo-bong; Shuji Matsuno / Shinji Matsuura	15; 8	15; 6
5	(South Korea) (Japan)	Lee Sang-bok / Chung Myung-hee; Koji Miya / Tokiko Hirota	15; 5	15; 3

South Korea
4
Copenhagen, Denmark
3 May 1991

Denmark
1

			1	2	3
1	(South Korea) (Denmark)	Chung Myung-hee / Hwang Hye-young; Pernille Dupont / Grete Mogensen	15; 13	15; 9
2	(South Korea) (Denmark)	Lee Heung-soon; Pernille Nedergaard	11; 5	11; 2
3	(South Korea) (Denmark)	Ahn Jae-chang; Thomas Stuer-Lauridsen	3; 15	15; 8	17; 14
4	(South Korea) (Denmark)	Kim Moon-soo / Park Joo-bong; Jan Paulsen / Henrik Svarrer	15; 7	15; 12
5	(South Korea) (Denmark)	Lee Sang-bok / Chung So-young; Jon Holst-Christensen / Grete Mogensen	2; 15	1; 15

==== Relegation play-off ====
Team one	Team two	Score
Sweden	Japan	4–1

==== Semi-finals ====
Team one	Team two	Score
Indonesia	Denmark	3–2
South Korea	China	3–2

Indonesia
3
Copenhagen, Denmark
4 May 1991

Denmark
2

			1	2	3
1	(Indonesia) (Denmark)	Rudy Gunawan / Rosiana Tendean; Thomas Lund / Pernille Dupont	18; 14	14; 18	12; 15
2	(Indonesia) (Denmark)	Susi Susanti; Camilla Martin	11; 6	11; 2
3	(Indonesia) (Denmark)	Joko Suprianto; Poul-Erik Høyer Larsen	10; 15	15; 12	15; 8
4	(Indonesia) (Denmark)	Erma Sulistianingsih / Rosiana Tendean; Dorte Kjær / Nettie Nielsen	17; 16	15; 4
5	(Indonesia) (Denmark)	Rudy Gunawan / Eddy Hartono; Jon Holst-Christensen / Thomas Lund	11; 15	8; 15

South Korea
3
Copenhagen, Denmark
4 May 1991

China
2

			1	2	3
1	(South Korea) (China)	Kim Moon-soo / Park Joo-bong; Li Yongbo / Tian Bingyi	15; 10	15; 2
2	(South Korea) (China)	Bang Soo-hyun; Tang Jiuhong	3; 11	6; 11
3	(South Korea) (China)	Chung So-young / Hwang Hye-young; Lai Caiqin / Yao Fen	15; 3	15; 4
4	(South Korea) (China)	Kim Hak-kyun; Wu Wenkai	6; 15	7; 15
5	(South Korea) (China)	Park Joo-bong / Chung Myung-hee; Yu Yong / Nong Qunhua	15; 7	15; 4

==== Final ====
Team one	Team two	Score
South Korea	Indonesia	3–2

South Korea
3
Copenhagen, Denmark
5 May 1991

Indonesia
2

			1	2	3
1	(South Korea) (Indonesia)	Park Joo-bong / Chung Myung-hee; Rudy Gunawan / Erma Sulistianingsih	15; 3	15; 7
2	(South Korea) (Indonesia)	Lee Kwang-jin; Ardy Wiranata	1; 15	5; 15
3	(South Korea) (Indonesia)	Bang Soo-hyun; Susi Susanti	11; 2	6; 11	6; 11
4	(South Korea) (Indonesia)	Chung So-young / Hwang Hye-young; Erma Sulistianingsih / Rosiana Tendean	15; 6	15; 7
5	(South Korea) (Indonesia)	Kim Moon-soo / Park Joo-bong; Rudy Gunawan / Eddy Hartono	15; 3	15; 5

1991 Sudirman Cup Champions

South Korea
First title

=== Group 2 ===
Team one	Team two	Score
England	Netherlands	5-0
England	Malaysia	3-2
England	Chinese Taipei	5-0
Netherlands	Malaysia	3-2
Netherlands	Chinese Taipei	3-2
Malaysia	Chinese Taipei	4-1

=== Group 3 ===
Team one	Team two	Score
Thailand	Soviet Union	4-1
Thailand	Scotland	4-1
Thailand	Canada	3-2
Soviet Union	Canada	3-2
Soviet Union	Scotland	4-1
Scotland	Canada	3-2

=== Group 4 ===
Team one	Team two	Score
Australia	Germany	3-2
Australia	New Zealand	4-1
Australia	Hong Kong	3-2
Germany	New Zealand	3-2
Germany	Hong Kong	3-2
New Zealand	Hong Kong	3-2

=== Group 5 ===
Team one	Team two	Score
India	Finland	4-1
India	United States	4-1
India	Poland	3-2
Finland	United States	5-0
Finland	Poland	1-4
United States	Poland	3-2

=== Group 6 ===
Team one	Team two	Score
Norway	(Republic of Ireland) Ireland	3-2
Norway	Iceland	4-1
Norway	Bulgaria	3-2
(Republic of Ireland) Ireland	Iceland	3-2
(Republic of Ireland) Ireland	Bulgaria	5-0
Iceland	Bulgaria	5-0

=== Group 7 ===
Team one	Team two	Score
Czechoslovakia	Switzerland	4-1
Czechoslovakia	France	3-2
Czechoslovakia	Mexico	3-2
Switzerland	France	5-0
Switzerland	Mexico	3-2
France	Mexico	3-2

=== Group 8 ===
Team one	Team two	Score
North Korea	Spain	4-1
North Korea	Mauritius	4-1
North Korea	Italy	5-0
North Korea	Malta	5-0
Spain	Mauritius	4-1
Spain	Italy	4-1
Spain	Malta	5-0
Mauritius	Italy	4-1
Mauritius	Malta	5-0
Italy	Malta	4-1

== Final classification ==
Group 1
Pos	Country
1	South Korea
2	Indonesia
3	Denmark
3	China
5	Sweden
6	Japan

Group 2
Pos	Country
7	England
8	Netherlands
9	Malaysia
10	Chinese Taipei

Group 3
Pos	Country
11	Thailand
12	Soviet Union
13	Scotland
14	Canada

Group 4
Pos	Country
15	Australia
16	Germany
17	New Zealand
18	Hong Kong

Group 5
Pos	Country
19	India
20	Poland
21	Finland
22	United States

Group 6
Pos	Country
23	Norway
24	Ireland
25	Iceland
26	Bulgaria

Group 7
Pos	Country
27	Czechoslovakia
28	Switzerland
29	France
30	Mexico

Group 8
Pos	Country
31	North Korea
32	Spain
33	Mauritius
34	Italy
35	Malta

Promoted to higher group
Relegated to lower group
