= 2017 BWF World Senior Championships – 45+ =

Tournament details
- Dates: 11 September 2017 – 17 September 2017
- Edition: 9
- Level: International
- Nations: 24
- Venue: Rajiv Gandhi Indoor Stadium
- Location: Kochi, India

Champions
- Men's singles: (Chinese Taipei) Wu Chang-jun
- Women's singles: (Hungary) Gondáné Fórián Csilla
- Men's doubles: (Thailand) Chatchai Boonmee (Thailand) Wittaya Panomchai
- Women's doubles: (England) Tracey Middleton (England) Joanne Muggeridge
- Mixed doubles: (England) Nick Ponting (England) Julie Bradbury

These are the results of 2017 BWF World Senior Championships' 45+ events, in badminton.

== Men's singles ==
=== Seeds ===
1. (Chinese Taipei) Wu Chang-jun (champion, gold medal)
2. (Denmark) Carsten Loesch (final, silver medal)
3. (Hungary) Tamas Gebhard (third round)
4. (Sweden) Ulf Svensson (semifinals, bronze medal)
5. (England) Justin G. Andrews (third round)
6. (India) Kiran Vinayakrao Makode (quarterfinals)
7. (Sweden) Stefan Edvardsson (quarterfinals)
8. (Sweden) Magnus Gustafsson (quarterfinals)

=== Finals ===
Semifinals
1	(Chinese Taipei) Wu Chang-jun	21	21
(India) Jaison Xavier	16	13
4	(Sweden) Ulf Svensson	11	20
2	(Denmark) Carsten Loesch	21	22

Final
1	(Chinese Taipei) Wu Chang-jun	21	21
2	(Denmark) Carsten Loesch	10	16

=== Top half ===
==== Section 1 ====
First Round
(Indonesia) L W Chandra	21	21
(Russia) E Lentochnik	8	6
(England) B Raj	11	10
(Sri Lanka) A U P J Samarakoon Miriyagodage	21	21

Second Round
1	(Chinese Taipei) Wu C-j	21	21
(Sweden) P J Baeza	10	6
(Poland) J Sazlapski	19	17
(Indonesia) L W Chandra	21	21
6	(India) K V Makode	21	21
(Germany) O Binus	13	12
(France) H Leclerc	21	22
(Sri Lanka) A U P J Samarakoon Miriyagodage	11	20

Third Round
1	(Chinese Taipei) Wu C-j	21	21
(Indonesia) L W Chandra	10	8
6	(India) K V Makode	21	21
(France) H Leclerc	17	17

Quarterfinals
1	(Chinese Taipei) Wu C-j	21	21
(India) K V Makode	7	12

==== Section 2 ====
First Round
(Norway) P Bhart	4^{r}
(India) J Xavier	12
(Japan) Y Maeda	21	14
(Denmark) H W Hansen	23	21

Second Round
3	(Hungary) T Gebhard	21	21
(England) H Singh	13	8
(France) S Grad	4	8
(India) J Xavier	21	21
7	(Sweden) S Edvardsson	21	21
(Sri Lanka) N D d S Jayasinghe	7	3
(Russia) I Yurov	9	12
(Denmark) H W Hansen	21	21

Third Round
3	(Hungary) T Gebhard	9	10
(India) J Xavier	21	21
7	(Sweden) S Edvardsson	21	21
(Denmark) H W Hansen	9	10

Quarterfinals
(India) J Xavier	21	21
7	(Sweden) S Edvardsson	12	13

=== Bottom half ===
==== Section 3 ====
First Round
(India) V Sharma	21	21
(Czech Republic) L Oroš	17	10
(Germany) M Kleibel	21	21
(Malaysia) Ng W K	16	19

Second Round
(India) V Sharma	21	21
(Russia) D Makarenkov	4	8
(Belgium) E J Timmerman	14	21	12
5	(England) J G. Andrews	21	13	21
(Germany) M Kleibel	21	21
(Sri Lanka) N Amarasena	18	17
(Australia) P Nair	8	5
4	(Sweden) U Svensson	21	21

Third Round
(India) V Sharma	21	21
5	(England) J G. Andrews	16	15
(Germany) M Kleibel	7	7
4	(Sweden) U Svensson	21	21

Quarterfinals
(India) V Sharma	15	14
4	(Sweden) U Svensson	21	21

==== Section 4 ====
First Round
(Slovenia) A Rovan	11	20
(France) S Gilleroon	21	22
(Croatia) S Saban	21	19	21
(Norway) T Jacobsen	17	21	15

Second Round
(France) S Gilleroon	21	21
(Japan) Y Kaifuku	19	6
(India) A A Pednekar	11	21	19
8	(Sweden) M Gustafsson	21	18	21
(Croatia) S Saban	17	24	16
(Germany) S Schrander	21	22	21
(Sri Lanka) N Delpchirta Achrige	5	0
2	(Denmark) C Loesch	21	21

Third Round
(France) S Gilleroon	11	13
8	(Sweden) M Gustafsson	21	21
(Germany) S Schrander	14	16
2	(Denmark) C Loesch	21	21

Quarterfinals
8	(Sweden) M Gustafsson	9	9
2	(Denmark) C Loesch	21	21

== Women's singles ==
=== Seeds ===
1. (Hungary) Gondáné Fórián Csilla (champion, gold medal)
2. (Poland) Dorota Grzejdak (final, silver medal)

=== Group A ===
Rank	Player	Pts	Pld	W	L	SF	SA	PF	PA
1	(Hungary) Gondáné Fórián Csilla	2	2	2	0	4	0	84	27
2	(India) Poonam Tatwawadi	1	2	1	1	2	2	60	50
3	(Germany) Stephanie Wigger	0	2	0	2	0	4	17	84

Date		Score		Set 1	Set 2	Set 3
11 Sep; 11:30	Gondáné Fórián Csilla (Hungary)	2–0	(Germany) Stephanie Wigger	21–5	21–4	
12 Sep; 11:30	Poonam Tatwawadi (India)	2–0	(Germany) Stephanie Wigger	21–4	21–4	
13 Sep; 11:10	Gondáné Fórián Csilla (Hungary)	2–0	(India) Poonam Tatwawadi	21–10	21–8	

=== Group B ===
Rank	Player	Pts	Pld	W	L	SF	SA	PF	PA
1	(England) Olga Bryant	3	3	3	0	6	0	135	75
2	(Sri Lanka) Sriyani Deepika Peiris Widanalge	2	3	2	1	4	2	126	88
3	(India) Sanjeevani Mahajan	1	3	1	2	2	4	82	97
4	(Greece) Georgia Vernardou	0	3	0	3	0	6	43	126

Date		Score		Set 1	Set 2	Set 3
11 Sep; 11:30	Olga Bryant (England)	2–0	(Greece) Georgia Vernardou	21–10	21–7	
11 Sep; 11:30	Sanjeevani Mahajan (India)	0–2	(Sri Lanka) Sriyani Deepika Peiris Widanalge	13–21	11–21	
12 Sep; 11:30	Sanjeevani Mahajan (India)	2–0	(Greece) Georgia Vernardou	21–6	21–7	
12 Sep; 11:30	Olga Bryant (England)	2–1	(Sri Lanka) Sriyani Deepika Peiris Widanalge	30–29	21–13	
13 Sep; 11:10	Sanjeevani Mahajan (India)	0–2	(England) Olga Bryant	8–21	8–21	
13 Sep; 11:10	Georgia Vernardou (Greece)	0–2	(Sri Lanka) Sriyani Deepika Peiris Widanalge	6–21	7–21	

=== Group C ===
Rank	Player	Pts	Pld	W	L	SF	SA	PF	PA
1	(England) Caroline Hale	3	3	3	0	6	1	139	95
2	(Germany) Marika Wippich	2	3	2	1	5	2	135	108
3	(France) Sylviane Le Pimpec	1	3	1	2	2	4	109	112
4	(India) Sunita Kumari	0	3	0	3	0	6	58	126

Date		Score		Set 1	Set 2	Set 3
11 Sep; 11:30	Caroline Hale (England)	2–1	(Germany) Marika Wippich	21–18	13–21	21–11
11 Sep; 11:30	Sunita Kumari (India)	0–2	(France) Sylviane Le Pimpec	15–21	12–21	
12 Sep; 11:30	Sunita Kumari (India)	0–2	(Germany) Marika Wippich	8–21	10–21	
12 Sep; 11:30	Caroline Hale (England)	2–0	(France) Sylviane Le Pimpec	21–17	21–15	
13 Sep; 11:10	Sunita Kumari (India)	0–2	(England) Caroline Hale	4–21	9–21	
13 Sep; 11:10	Marika Wippich (Germany)	2–0	(France) Sylviane Le Pimpec	22–20	21–15	

=== Group D ===
Rank	Player	Pts	Pld	W	L	SF	SA	PF	PA
1	(Poland) Dorota Grzejdak	3	3	3	0	6	0	126	54
2	(India) Sahlini Yadav	2	3	2	1	4	2	110	99
3	(Sweden) Anne-Marie Wellendorph	1	3	1	2	2	4	86	119
4	(Denmark) Malene Wahlstroem Hansen	0	3	0	3	0	6	76	126

Date		Score		Set 1	Set 2	Set 3
11 Sep; 10:30	Dorota Grzejdak (Poland)	2–0	(Sweden) Anne-Marie Wellendorph	21–6	21–9	
11 Sep; 12:00	Shalini Yadav (India)	2–0	(Denmark) Malene Wahlstroem Hansen	21–11	21–17	
12 Sep; 11:30	Dorota Grzejdak (Poland)	2–0	(Denmark) Malene Wahlstroem Hansen	21–10	21–3	
12 Sep; 11:30	Shalini Yadav (India)	2–0	(Sweden) Anne-Marie Wellendorph	21–12	21–17	
13 Sep; 11:10	Dorota Grzejdak (Poland)	2–0	(India) Shalini Yadav	21–12	21–14	
13 Sep; 11:10	Malene Wahlstroem Hansen (Denmark)	0–2	(Sweden) Anne-Marie Wellendorph	19–21	16–21	

=== Finals ===
Quarterfinals
A1	(Hungary) Gondáné Fórián Csilla	21	21
D2	(India) Sahlini Yadav	7	9
B1	(England) Olga Bryant	15	10
C2	(Germany) Marika Wippich	21	21
B2	(Sri Lanka) Sriyani Deepika Peiris Widanalge	5	11
C1	(England) Caroline Hale	21	21
A2	(India) Poonam Tatwawadi	11	19
D1	(Poland) Dorota Grzejdak	21	21

Semifinals
A1	(Hungary) Gondáné Fórián Csilla	21	21
C2	(Germany) Marika Wippich	18	13
C1	(England) Caroline Hale	20	14
D1	(Poland) Dorota Grzejdak	22	21

Final
A1	(Hungary) Gondáné Fórián Csilla	21	21
D1	(Poland) Dorota Grzejdak	12	11

== Men's doubles ==
=== Seeds ===
1. (Thailand) Wattana Ampunsuwan / Naruthum Surakkhaka (second round)
2. (Thailand) Chatchai Boonmee / Wittaya Panomchai (champions, gold medal)
3. (India) Venkataraju Akula / B. V. S. K. Lingeswara Rao (quarterfinals)
4. (England) Justin G. Andrews / (Russia) Vadim Nazarov (second round)

=== Finals ===
Semifinals
(India) Srikant Bakshi (India) Navdeep Singh	21	21
(Sweden) Stefan Edvardsson (Sweden) Ulf Svensson	15	19
(India) Venkataraju Akula (India) B. V. S. K. Lingeswara Rao	10	18
2	(Thailand) Chatchai Boonmee (Thailand) Wittaya Panomchai	21	21

Final
(India) Srikant Bakshi (India) Navdeep Singh	18	21	15
2	(Thailand) Chatchai Boonmee (Thailand) Wittaya Panomchai	21	18	21

=== Top half ===
==== Section 1 ====
First Round
(Indonesia) J Cahyadi (Indonesia) L W Chandra	18	7
(Sri Lanka) L Homer (Sri Lanka) A U P J Samarakoon Miriyagodage	21	21
(India) S Bakshi (India) N Singh	21	21
(England) H G. Dibble (England) M Titchener	17	13

Second Round
1	(Thailand) W Ampunsuwan (Thailand) N Surakkhaka	11	13
(Sri Lanka) L Homer (Sri Lanka) A U P J Samarakoon Miriyagodage	21	21
(Japan) Y Kaifuku (Japan) Y Maeda	14	18
(India) S Bakshi (India) N Singh	21	21

Quarterfinals
(Sri Lanka) L Homer (Sri Lanka) A U P J Samarakoon Miriyagodage	14	15
(India) S Bakshi (India) N Singh	21	21

==== Section 2 ====
First Round
(Sweden) S Edvardsson (Sweden) U Svensson	21	21
(Denmark) B T J Jensen (Denmark) A Steenkjaer	15	8
(Germany) M Anhäuser (Germany) O Binus	w	/	o
(Norway) P Bhart (France) S Gilleron
(Slovenia) A Rovan (Croatia) S Saban	20	12
(India) J George (India) R P Paraikudi Vasu	22	21

Second Round
4	(England) J G. Andrews (Russia) V Nazarov	10	10
(Sweden) S Edvardsson (Sweden) U Svensson	21	21
(Germany) M Anhäuser (Germany) O Binus	17	20
(India) J George (India) R P Paraikudi Vasu	21	22

Quarterfinals
(Sweden) S Edvardsson (Sweden) U Svensson	21	21
(India) J George (India) R P Paraikudi Vasu	5	10

=== Bottom half ===
==== Section 3 ====
First Round
(Thailand) T Jaruwat (Thailand) Y Laothoedpong	21	21
(Sweden) J Gate (Sweden) M Tornemo	13	10
(Denmark) H W Hansen (Denmark) E Pedersen	21	21
(France) S Grad (France) H Leclerc	6	10
(Germany) M Kleibel (Germany) S Schrader	21	21
(Russia) E Lentochnik (Australia) P Nair	9	11

Second Round
(Thailand) T Jaruwat (Thailand) Y Laothoedpong	21	23	21
(Denmark) H W Hansen (Denmark) E Pedersen	8	25	14
(Germany) M Kleibel (Germany) S Schrader	14	23	20
3	(India) V Akula (India) B. V. S. K. Lingeswara Rao	21	21	22

Quarterfinals
(Thailand) T Jaruwat (Thailand) Y Laothoedpong	12	19
3	(India) V Akula (India) B. V. S. K. Lingeswara Rao	21	21

==== Section 4 ====
First Round
(Sweden) P J Baeza (Sweden) M Gustafsson	11	16
(England) B Raj (England) B Sisupalan	21	21
(Hungary) T Gebhard (Malaysia) Ng W K	21	21
(Germany) B Raj (Poland) J Szalapski	13	14
(India) M Mehta (India) R Sharma	w	/	o
(Russia) S Mironov (Russia) P Uvarov

Second Round
(England) B Raj (England) B Sisupalan	10	14
(Hungary) T Gebhard (Malaysia) Ng W K	21	21
(India) M Mehta (India) R Sharma	5	9
2	(Thailand) C Boonmee (Thailand) W Panomchai	21	21

Quarterfinals
(Hungary) T Gebhard (Malaysia) Ng W K	9	8
2	(Thailand) C Boonmee (Thailand) W Panomchai	21	21

== Women's doubles ==
=== Seeds ===
1. (England) Tracey Middleton / Joanne Muggeridge (champions, gold medal)
2. (Germany) Jana Dudek / (Poland) Dorota Grzejdak (quarterfinals)

=== Group A ===
Rank	Player	Pts	Pld	W	L	SF	SA	PF	PA
1	(England) Tracey Middleton (England) Joanne Muggeridge	1	1	1	0	2	0	42	28
2	(India) Sangeeta Rajgopalan (India) Poonam Tatwawadi	0	1	0	1	0	2	28	42

Date		Score		Set 1	Set 2	Set 3
11 Sep; 16:30	Tracey Middleton (England); Joanne Muggeridge (England)	2–0	(India) Sangeeta Rajgopalan (India) Poonam Tatwawadi	21–16	21–12	

=== Group B ===
Rank	Player	Pts	Pld	W	L	SF	SA	PF	PA
1	(Denmark) Malene Wahlstroem Hansen (Germany) Stephanie Wigger	1	2	1	1	3	2	97	88
2	(India) Rajshree Nitin Bhave (India) Dimple Sinha	1	2	1	1	2	2	72	77
3	(Hungary) Gondáné Fórián Csilla (Greece) Georgia Vernardou	1	2	1	1	2	3	93	97

Date		Score		Set 1	Set 2	Set 3
11 Sep; 16:30	Rajshree Nitin Bhave (India); Dimple Sinha (India)	2–0	(Hungary) Gondáné Fórián Csilla (Greece) Georgia Vernardou	21–18	21–17	
12 Sep; 18:30	Malene Wahlstroem Hansen (Denmark); Stephanie Wigger (Germany)	1–2	(Hungary) Gondáné Fórián Csilla (Greece) Georgia Vernardou	17–21	21–16	17–21
13 Sep; 16:10	Rajshree Nitin Bhave (India); Dimple Sinha (India)	0–2	(Denmark) Malene Wahlstroem Hansen (Germany) Stephanie Wigger	19–21	11–21	

=== Group C ===
Rank	Player	Pts	Pld	W	L	SF	SA	PF	PA
1	(Denmark) Hanne Bertelsen (England) Caroline Hale	2	2	2	0	4	0	84	550
2	(Germany) Tanja Eberl (Germany) Marika Wippich	1	2	1	1	2	2	70	58
3	(India) Sindhu Devasia (India) Kavithaa Srinivasan	0	2	0	2	0	4	38	64

Date		Score		Set 1	Set 2	Set 3
11 Sep; 16:30	Sindhu Devasia (India); Kavithaa Srinivasan (India)	0–2	(Germany) Tanja Eberl (Germany) Marika Wippich	6–21	10–21	
12 Sep; 18:30	Hanne Bertelsen (Denmark); Caroline Hale (England)	2–0	(Germany) Tanja Eberl (Germany) Marika Wippich	21–11	21–17	
13 Sep; 16:10	Sindhu Devasia (India); Kavithaa Srinivasan (India)	0–2	(Denmark) Hanne Bertelsen (England) Varoline Hale	12–21	10–21	

=== Group D ===
Rank	Player	Pts	Pld	W	L	SF	SA	PF	PA
1	(France) Sylviane Le Pimpec (France) Marie-Noelle Lechalupe	2	2	2	0	4	0	84	49
2	(Germany) Jana Dudek (Poland) Dorota Grzejdak	1	2	1	1	2	2	70	59
3	(India) Vanhmingthangi (India) Zodinsangi	0	2	0	2	0	4	38	84

Date		Score		Set 1	Set 2	Set 3
11 Sep; 16:30	Jana Dudek (Germany); Dorota Grzejdak (Poland)	0–2	(France) Sylviane Le Pimpec (France) Marie-Noelle Lechalupe	16–21	12–21	
12 Sep; 18:30	Vanhmingthangi (India); Zodinsangi (India)	0–2	(France) Sylviane Le Pimpec (France) Marie-Noelle Lechalupe	11–21	10–21	
13 Sep; 19:05	Jana Dudek (Germany); Dorota Grzejdak (Poland)	2–0	(India) Vanhmingthangi (India) Zodinsangi	21–9	21–8	

=== Finals ===
First Round
A1	(England) Tracey Middleton (England) Joanne Muggeridge	21	21
B2	(India) Rajshree Nitin Bhave (India) Dimple Sinha	6	3
C1	(Denmark) Hanne Bertelsen (England) Caroline Hale	21	21
D2	(Germany) Jana Dudek (Poland) Dorota Grzejdak	11	17
A2	(India) Sangeeta Rajgopalan (India) Poonam Tatwawadi	21	21
B1	(Denmark) Malene Wahlstroem Hansen (Germany) Stephanie Wigger	7	4
C2	(Germany) Tanja Eberl (Germany) Marika Wippich	24	21
D1	(France) Sylviane Le Pimpec (France) Marie-Noelle Lechalupe	22	16

Second Round
A1	(England) Tracey Middleton (England) Joanne Muggeridge	21	21
C1	(Denmark) Hanne Bertelsen (England) Caroline Hale	9	17
A2	(India) Sangeeta Rajgopalan (India) Poonam Tatwawadi	18	13
C2	(Germany) Tanja Eberl (Germany) Marika Wippich	21	21

Quarterfinals
A1	(England) Tracey Middleton (England) Joanne Muggeridge	21	21
C2	(Germany) Tanja Eberl (Germany) Marika Wippich	8	12

== Mixed doubles ==
=== Seeds ===
1. (England) Nick Ponting / Julie Bradbury (champions, gold medal)
2. (Sweden) Patrik Bjorkler / (Hungary) Gondáné Fórián Csilla (final, silver medal)
3. (England) Justin G. Andrews / Betty Blair (quarterfinals)
4. (Denmark) Brian Tim Juul Jensen / (England) Caroline Hale (quarterfinals)

=== Finals ===
Semifinals
1	(England) Nick Ponting (England) Julie Bradbury	21	21
(Thailand) Teerachai Jaruwat (Thailand) Puangthip Kaosamaang	12	11
(Sweden) Stefan Edvardsson (Denmark) Hanne Bertelsen	13	10
2	(Sweden) Patrik Bjokler (Hungary) Gondáné Fóriáne Csilla	21	21

Final
1	(England) Nick Ponting (England) Julie Bradbury	21	21
2	(Sweden) Patrik Bjokler (Hungary) Gondáné Fóriáne Csilla	18	14

=== Top half ===
==== Section 1 ====
First Round
(Norway) P Bhart (Greece) G Vernardou
(India) C S Rao (India) S Venglet	w	/	o

Second Round
1	(England) N Ponting (England) J Bradbury	21	21
(Germany) O Binus (Germany) S Wigger	5	5
(Indonesia) J Cahyadi (South Korea) Han H-j	21	19	21
(India) C S Rao (India) S Venglet	18	21	14

Quarterfinals
1	(England) N Ponting (England) J Bradbury	21	23
(Indonesia) J Cahyadi (South Korea) Han H-j	19	21

==== Section 2 ====
First Round
(India) M V R Meka (India) B S Tirumalasetty	25	15	17
(Sweden) P J Baeza (Sweden) A-M Wellendorph	23	21	21
(Thailand) T Jaruwat (Thailand) P Kaosamaang	21	21
(France) S Grad (France) S Le Pimpec	13	18

Second Round
4	(Denmark) B T J Jensen (England) C Hale	21	21
(Sweden) P J Baeza (Sweden) A-M Wellendorph	10	9
(Poland) J Szałapski (Poland) D Frzejdak	15	11
(Thailand) T Jaruwat (Thailand) P Kaosamaang	21	21

Quarterfinals
4	(Denmark) B T J Jensen (England) C Hale	18	21	14
(Thailand) T Jaruwat (Thailand) P Kaosamaang	21	15	21

=== Bottom half ===
==== Section 3 ====
First Round
(Denmark) H W Hansen (Denmark) M W Hansen	21	15	21
(Germany) M Kleibel (Germany) M Wippich	17	21	16
(Sweden) S Edvardsson (Denmark) H Bertelsen	21	21
(Sri Lanka) N D d S Jayasinghe (Sri Lanka) S D P Widanalge	17	10

Second Round
(Denmark) H W Hansen (Denmark) M W Hansen	21	16	21
(India) K V Makode (India) P Tatwawadi	16	21	14
(Sweden) S Edvardsson (Denmark) H Bertelsen	21	21
3	(England) J G. Andrews (England) B Blair	17	13

Quarterfinals
(Denmark) H W Hansen (Denmark) M W Hansen	21	14
(Sweden) S Edvardsson (Denmark) H Bertelsen	23	21

==== Section 4 ====
First Round
(Japan) S Yoshida (Japan) R Nagasawa	21	21	21
(England) H G. Dibble (England) O Bryant	11	23	15
(Thailand) N Schrader (Thailand) A Charumilinda	21	21
(France) H Leclerc (France) M-N Lechalupe	19	19

Second Round
(Japan) S Yoshida (Japan) R Nagasawa	21	21
(Germany) S Schrader (Hong Kong) Zhou X	15	11
(Thailand) N Schrader (Thailand) A Charumilinda	9	17
2	(Sweden) P Bjokler (Hungary) Gondáné Fórián C	21	21

Quarterfinals
(Japan) S Yoshida (Japan) R Nagasawa	14	11
2	(Sweden) P Bjokler (Hungary) Gondáné Fórián C	21	21
