= Erma Sulistianingsih =

Indonesian badminton player

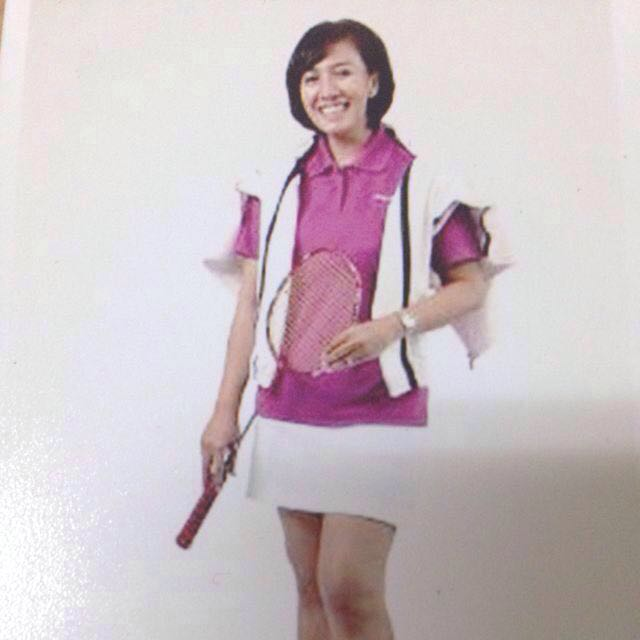

Personal information
- Born: 5 November 1965 (age 61)

Sport
- Country: Indonesia
- Sport: Badminton
- Event: Women's & mixed doubles

Women's & mixed doubles
- BWF profile
Medal record
Women's badminton
Representing Indonesia
World Cup
Silver medal – second place	1990 Bandung–Jakarta	Women's doubles
Silver medal – second place	1991 Macau	Women's doubles
Bronze medal – third place	1990 Bandung-Jakarta	Mixed doubles
Bronze medal – third place	1992 Guangzhou	Women's doubles
Sudirman Cup
Silver medal – second place	1991 Copenhagen	Mixed team
Uber Cup
Bronze medal – third place	1988 Kuala Lumpur	Women's team
Bronze medal – third place	1990 Nagoya–Tokyo	Women's team
Bronze medal – third place	1992 Kuala Lumpur	Women's team
Asian Games
Silver medal – second place	1990 Beijing	Women's team
Asian Cup
Bronze medal – third place	1991 Jakarta	Women's doubles
Southeast Asian Games
Gold medal – first place	1987 Jakarta	Women's team
Gold medal – first place	1989 Kuala Lumpur	Women's doubles
Gold medal – first place	1989 Kuala Lumpur	Women's team
Gold medal – first place	1991 Manila	Women's doubles
Gold medal – first place	1991 Manila	Women's team
Silver medal – second place	1987 Jakarta	Women's doubles
Silver medal – second place	1991 Manila	Mixed doubles

Erma Sulistianingsih (born 5 November 1965) is an Indonesian badminton player.

A doubles specialist, Sulistianingsih competed in women's doubles with Rosiana Tendean at the 1992 Summer Olympics in Barcelona. Together, they won consecutive World Grand Prix Finals titles, in 1989 and 1990, and two Indonesia Opens in 1989 and 1992. They also reached two World Cup finals in 1990 in Bandung & Jakarta, Indonesia and in 1991 in Macau. She competed at the 1989 IBF World Championships in Jakarta. In the women's doubles, together with Rosiana Tendean, she reached the quarterfinals, where they were eliminated by eventual gold medalists Lin Ying and Guan Weizhen. She reached the second round in mixed doubles with Ricky Subagdja.

== Achievements ==
=== World Cup ===
Women's doubles
Year	Venue	Partner	Opponent	Score	Result
1990	Istora Senayan, Jakarta, Indonesia	(Indonesia) Rosiana Tendean	(China) Lai Caiqin (China) Yao Fen	15–3, 10–15, 4–15	Silver
1991	Macau Forum, Macau	(Indonesia) Rosiana Tendean	(South Korea) Chung So-young (South Korea) Hwang Hye-young	3–15, 3–15	Silver
1992	Guangdong Gymnasium, Guangzhou, China	(Indonesia) Rosiana Tendean	(England) Gillian Gowers (England) Sara Sankey	15–18, 15–18	Bronze

Mixed doubles
Year	Venue	Partner	Opponent	Score	Result
1990	Istora Senayan, Jakarta, Indonesia	(Indonesia) Aryono Miranat	(Denmark) Jan Paulsen (England) Gillian Gowers	8–15, 4–15	Bronze

=== Asian Cup ===
Women's doubles
Year	Venue	Partner	Opponent	Score	Result
1991	Istora Senayan, Jakarta, Indonesia	(Indonesia) Rosiana Tendean	(South Korea) Chung So-young (South Korea) Hwang Hye-young	3–15, 15–5, 11–15	Bronze

=== SEA Games ===
Women's doubles
Year	Venue	Partner	Opponent	Score	Result
1987	Kuningan Hall, Jakarta, Indonesia	(Indonesia) Yanti Kusmiati	(Indonesia) Verawaty Fadjrin (Indonesia) Rosiana Tendean	14–17, 17–15, 10–15	Silver
1989	Stadium Negara, Kuala Lumpur, Malaysia	(Indonesia) Rosiana Tendean	(Indonesia) Verawaty Fadjrin (Indonesia) Yanti Kusmiati	15–6, 15–6	Gold
1991	Camp Crame Gymnasium, Manila, Philippines	(Indonesia) Rosiana Tendean	(Indonesia) Finarsih (Indonesia) Lili Tampi	15–10, 15–10	Gold

Mixed doubles
Year	Venue	Partner	Opponent	Score	Result
1991	Camp Crame Gymnasium, Manila, Philippines	(Indonesia) Rexy Mainaky	(Indonesia) Ricky Subagja (Indonesia) Rosiana Tendean	6–15, 13–15	Silver

=== IBF World Grand Prix (5 titles, 8 runners-up) ===
The World Badminton Grand Prix was sanctioned by the International Badminton Federation from 1983 to 2006.

Women's doubles
Year	Tournament	Partner	Opponent	Score	Result
1987	Poona Open	(Indonesia) Sarwendah Kusumawardhani	(England) Gillian Clark (England) Gillian Gowers	3–15, 5–15	(silver) Runner-up
1989	German Open	(Indonesia) Rosiana Tendean	(England) Gillian Clark (England) Gillian Gowers	10–15, 15–2, 15–9	(gold) Winner
1989	Indonesia Open	(Indonesia) Rosiana Tendean	(Indonesia) Verawaty Fadjrin (Indonesia) Yanti Kusmiati	15–7, 15–9	(gold) Winner
1989	World Grand Prix Finals	(Indonesia) Rosiana Tendean	(Denmark) Dorte Kjær (Denmark) Nettie Nielsen	11–15, 18–16, 18–16	(gold) Winner
1990	Indonesia Open	(Indonesia) Rosiana Tendean	(South Korea) Chung Myung-hee (South Korea) Chung So-young	15–17, 15–8, 3–15	(silver) Runner-up
1990	World Grand Prix Finals	(Indonesia) Rosiana Tendean	(China) Lai Caiqin (China) Yao Fen	14–18, 10–15	(silver) Runner-up
1991	Chinese Taipei Open	(Indonesia) Rosiana Tendean	(Japan) Kimiko Jinnai (Japan) Hisako Mori	7–15, 17–18	(silver) Runner-up
1991	World Grand Prix Finals	(Indonesia) Rosiana Tendean	(South Korea) Chung So-young (South Korea) Hwang Hye-young	15–18, 3–15	(silver) Runner-up
1992	Indonesia Open	(Indonesia) Rosiana Tendean	(England) Gillian Clark (England) Gillian Gowers	15–12, 15–9	(gold) Winner
1992	Hong Kong Open	(Indonesia) Rosiana Tendean	(China) Nong Qunhua (China) Zhou Lei	8–15, 6–15	(silver) Runner-up
1992	Thailand Open	(Indonesia) Rosiana Tendean	(China) Nong Qunhua (China) Zhou Lei	4–15, 15–12, 8–15	(silver) Runner-up

Mixed doubles
Year	Tournament	Partner	Opponent	Score	Result
1988	Indonesia Open	(Indonesia) Eddy Hartono	(Indonesia) Bobby Ertanto (Indonesia) Verawaty Fadjrin	15–9, 15–11	(gold) Winner
1990	Indonesia Open	(Indonesia) Aryono Miranat	(Indonesia) Rudy Gunawan (Indonesia) Rosiana Tendean	5–15, 15–11, 4–15	(silver) Runner-up

IBF Grand Prix tournament
IBF Grand Prix Finals tournament
