= 1989 World Badminton Grand Prix Finals =

Tournament details
- Dates: 6–10 December
- Edition: 7
- Total prize money: US$176,050
- Location: Singapore

The 1989 World Badminton Grand Prix was the seventh edition of the World Badminton Grand Prix finals. It was held in Singapore, from December 6 to December 10, 1989.

== Final results ==
Category	Winners	Runners-up	Score
Men's singles	(China) Xiong Guobao	(Malaysia) Foo Kok Keong	15–11, 15–7
Women's singles	(China) Tang Jiuhong	(China) Han Aiping	12–11, 12–10
Men's doubles	(Malaysia) Jalani Sidek & Razif Sidek	(China) Li Yongbo & Tian Bingyi	15–9, 15–5
Women's doubles	(Indonesia) Rosiana Tendean & Erma Sulistianingsih	(Denmark) Dorte Kjær & Nettie Nielsen	11–15, 18–16, 18–16
Mixed doubles	(Indonesia) Eddy Hartono & Verawaty Wiharjo	(Denmark) Thomas Lund & Pernille Dupont	12–15, 15–7, 15–6
