= 1990 World Badminton Grand Prix Finals =

Tournament details
- Dates: 12–16 December
- Edition: 8
- Total prize money: US$176,050
- Location: Denpasar, Bali, Indonesia

The 1990 World Badminton Grand Prix was the eighth edition of the World Badminton Grand Prix finals. It was held in Denpasar, Bali, Indonesia, from December 12 to December 16, 1990.

== Final results ==
Category	Winners	Runners-up	Score
Men's singles	(Indonesia) Eddy Kurniawan	(Malaysia) Rashid Sidek	18–13, 9–15, 15–2
Women's singles	(Indonesia) Susi Susanti	(China) Tang Jiuhong	8–11, 11–5, 12–10
Men's doubles	(Indonesia) Eddy Hartono & Rudy Gunawan	(Malaysia) Cheah Soon Kit & Soo Beng Kiang	15–6, 15–8
Women's doubles	(China) Lai Caiqin & Yao Fen	(Indonesia) Rosiana Tendean & Erma Sulistianingsih	18–14, 15–10
Mixed doubles	(Denmark) Thomas Lund & Pernille Dupont	(Denmark) Jon Holst-Christensen & Grete Mogensen	12–15, 15–9, 15–8

=== Men's singles ===
Quarterfinals
(China) Yang Yang	15	15
(Sweden) Pär-Gunnar Jönsson	10	11
(Indonesia) Eddy Kurniawan	15	15
(Denmark) Thomas Stuer-Lauridsen	12	13
(China) Zhao Jianhua	11	15	12
(Indonesia) Ardy Wiranata	15	8	15
(South Korea) Park Joo Bong	12	11
(Malaysia) Rashid Sidek	15	15

Semifinals
(China) Yang Yang	11	15	15
(Indonesia) Eddy Kurniawan	15	8	17
(Indonesia) Ardy Wiranata	14	10
(Malaysia) Rashid Sidek	17	15

Finals
(Indonesia) Eddy Kurniawan	18	9	15
(Malaysia) Rashid Sidek	13	15	2

=== Women's singles ===
Quarterfinals
(China) Li Lingwei	12	11
(South Korea) Bang Soo Hyun	10	7
(China) Tang Jiuhong	11	11
(Sweden) Lim Xiaoqing	4	5
(Indonesia) Sarwendah Kusumawardhani	10	8
(China) Han Aiping	11	11
(China) Han Jingna	4	2
(Indonesia) Susi Susanti	11	11

Semifinals
(China) Li Lingwei	9	8
(China) Tang Jiuhong	11	11
(China) Han Aiping	7	10
(Indonesia) Susi Susanti	11	12

Finals
(China) Tang Jiuhong	8	11	10
(Indonesia) Susi Susanti	11	5	12
