= Guan Weizhen =

Chinese badminton player (born 1964)

Guan Weizhen 关渭贞
Personal information
- Born: 15 June 1964 (age 62) Guangzhou, Guangdong, China
- Height: 1.72 m (5 ft 8 in)
- Weight: 70 kg (154 lb)

Sport
- Country: China
- Sport: Badminton
- Handedness: Right
- Event: Women's doubles
Medal record
Women's badminton
Representing China
Olympic Games
Silver medal – second place	1992 Barcelona	Women's doubles
World Championships
Gold medal – first place	1987 Beijing	Women's doubles
Gold medal – first place	1989 Jakarta	Women's doubles
Gold medal – first place	1991 Copenhagen	Women's doubles
World Cup
Gold medal – first place	1988 Bangkok	Women's doubles
Gold medal – first place	1989 Guangzhou	Women's doubles
Silver medal – second place	1987 Kuala Lumpur	Women's doubles
Sudirman Cup
Bronze medal – third place	1989 Jakarta	Mixed team
Bronze medal – third place	1991 Copenhagen	Mixed team
Uber Cup
Gold medal – first place	1986 Jakarta	Women's team
Gold medal – first place	1988 Kuala Lumpur	Women's team
Gold medal – first place	1990 Tokyo	Women's team
Gold medal – first place	1992 Kuala Lumpur	Women's team
Asian Games
Gold medal – first place	1986 Seoul	Women's doubles
Gold medal – first place	1990 Beijing	Women's doubles
Gold medal – first place	1986 Seoul	Women's team
Gold medal – first place	1990 Beijing	Women's team
Asian Championships
Gold medal – first place	1983 Calcutta	Women's doubles
Bronze medal – third place	1983 Calcutta	Women's singles

Guan Weizhen (Chinese: 关渭贞; born 3 June 3 1964) is a Chinese badminton player. Guan won numerous major international doubles titles in the late 1980s and early 1990s. She is the first woman to have won three consecutive women's doubles titles at the BWF World Championships until Yu Yang repeat the feat in 2013 followed by the pair of Chen Qingchen and Jia Yifan in 2023. She won the 1987 and 1989 tournaments with Lin Ying, and the 1991 tourney with Nong Qunhua.She was a member of Chinese Uber Cup (women's international) teams that won 4 Time Consecutive In 1986, 1988, 1990 and 1992. Guan competed in badminton at the 1992 Summer Olympics in women's doubles, and earned the silver medal together with Nong Qunhua and retired soon after. Now she is working as an associate administrator of Guangzhou Sports Administration and director of Guangzhou Badminton Sports Administration Center.

== Achievements ==
=== Olympic Games ===
Women's doubles
Year	Venue	Partner	Opponent	Score	Result
1988 (Exhibition)	Seoul National University Gymnasium, Seoul, South Korea	(China) Lin Ying	(South Korea) Chung So-young (South Korea) Kim Yun-ja	11–15, 17–14, 5–15	Silver
1992	Pavelló de la Mar Bella, Barcelona, Spain	(China) Nong Qunhua	(South Korea) Chung So-young (South Korea) Hwang Hye-young	16–18, 15–12, 13–15	Silver

=== World Championships ===
Women's Doubles
Year	Venue	Partner	Opponent	Score	Result
1987	Capital Indoor Stadium, Beijing, China	(China) Lin Ying	(China) Han Aiping (China) Li Lingwei	15–7, 15–8	Gold
1989	Istora Senayan, Jakarta, Indonesia	(China) Lin Ying	(South Korea) Chung Myung-hee (South Korea) Hwang Hye-young	15–1, 15–7	Gold
1991	Brøndby Arena, Copenhagen, Denmark	(China) Nong Qunhua	(Sweden) Maria Bengtsson (Sweden) Christine Magnusson	15–7, 15–4	Gold

=== World Cup ===
Women's doubles
Year	Venue	Partner	Opponent	Score	Result
1987	Stadium Negara, Kuala Lumpur, Malaysia	(China) Lin Ying	(China) Han Aiping (China) Li Lingwei	10–15, 15–11, 5–15	Silver
1988	National Stadium, Bangkok, Thailand	(China) Lin Ying	(South Korea) Chung So-young (South Korea) Kim Yun-ja	15–3, 15–7	Gold
1989	Canton Gymnasium, Guangzhou, China	(China) Lin Ying	(South Korea) Chung So-young (South Korea) Hwang Hye-young	15–2, 17–15	Gold

=== Asian Games ===
Women's Doubles
Year	Venue	Partner	Opponent	Score	Result
1986	Olympic Gymnastics Arena, Seoul, South Korea	(China) Lin Ying	(South Korea) Kim Yun-ja (South Korea) Yoo Sang-hee	15–9, 8–15, 15–10	Gold
1990	Beijing Gymnasium, Beijing, China	(China) Nong Qunhua	(South Korea) Chung So-young (South Korea) Gil Young-ah	15–11, 15–4	Gold

=== Asian Championships ===
Women's Singles
Year	Venue	Opponent	Score	Result
1983	Netaji Indoor Stadium, Calcutta, India	(South Korea) Kim Yun-ja	11–7, 4–11, 1–11	Bronze

Women's doubles
Year	Venue	Partner	Opponent	Score	Result
1983	Netaji Indoor Stadium, Calcutta, India	(China) Fan Ming	(South Korea) Kim Bok-sun (South Korea) Park Hyun-sook	15–11, 15–3	Gold

=== IBF World Grand Prix (22 titles, 8 runners-up) ===
The World Badminton Grand Prix sanctioned by International Badminton Federation (IBF) from 1983 to 2006.

Women's Doubles
Year	Tournament	Partner	Opponent	Score	Result
1984	Malaysia Open	(China) Wu Jianqiu	(England) Gillian Clark (Sweden) Christine Magnusson	15–10, 15–13	(gold) Winner
1984	Indonesia Open	(China) Wu Jianqiu	(England) Nora Perry (England) Jane Webster	15–9, 16–18, 15–18	(silver) Runner-up
1985	Japan Open	(China) Wu Jianqiu	(South Korea) Kim Yun-ja (South Korea) Yoo Sang-hee	5–15, 3–15	(silver) Runner-up
1985	German Open	(China) Wu Jianqiu	(England) Karen Beckman (England) Gillian Gilks	15–9, 6–15, 15–9	(gold) Winner
1985	Swedish Open	(China) Wu Jianqiu	(China) Han Aiping (China) Li Lingwei	12–15, 6–15	(silver) Runner-up
1985	Thailand Open	(China) Wu Jianqiu	(Indonesia) Rosiana Tendean (Indonesia) Imelda Wiguna	15–1, 15–0	(gold) Winner
1986	Hong Kong Open	(China) Lao Yujing	(China) Han Aiping (China) Li Lingwei	15–18, 9–15	(silver) Runner-up
1987	Japan Open	(China) Lin Ying	(South Korea) Chung Myung-hee (South Korea) Hwang Hye-young	15–5, 15–6	(gold) Winner
1987	German Open	(China) Lin Ying	(England) Gillian Clark (England) Gillian Gowers	15–6, 15–10	(gold) Winner
1987	Scandinavian Open	(China) Lin Ying	(China) Li Lingwei (China) Qian Ping	15–1, 15–8	(gold) Winner
1987	All England Open	(China) Lin Ying	(South Korea) Chung Myung-hee (South Korea) Hwang Hye-young	6–15, 15–8, 11–15	(silver) Runner-up
1987	China Open	(China) Lin Ying	(China) Lao Yujing (China) Wu Jianqiu	15–5, 15–2	(gold) Winner
1987	Thailand Open	(China) Lin Ying	(China) Luo Yun (China) Zhou Lei	6–15, 15–5, 15–11	(gold) Winner
1987	Malaysia Open	(China) Lin Ying	(Denmark) Dorte Kjaer (Denmark) Nettie Nielsen	15–2, 15–1	(gold) Winner
1987	Grand Prix Finals	(China) Lin Ying	(South Korea) Chung Myung-hee (South Korea) Hwang Hye-young	15–6, 13–15, 15–4	(gold) Winner
1988	Swedish Open	(China) Lin Ying	(China) Lao Yujing (China) Zheng Yuli	15–4, 15–8	(gold) Winner
1988	Hong Kong Open	(China) Lin Ying	(China) Han Aiping (China) Shang Fumei	15–10, 15–4	(gold) Winner
1988	China Open	(China) Lin Ying	(China) Sun Xiaoqing (China) Zhou Lei	15–8, 15–4	(gold) Winner
1988	English Masters	(China) Lin Ying	(England) Gillian Clark (England) Sara Sankey	15–8, 15–6	(gold) Winner
1988	Denmark Open	(China) Lin Ying	(Denmark) Dorte Kjaer (Denmark) Nettie Nielsen	15–3, 15–12	(gold) Winner
1988	Malaysia Open	(China) Lin Ying	(South Korea) Chung So-young (South Korea) Kim Yun-ja	15–6, 15–3	(gold) Winner
1988	Grand Prix Finals	(China) Lin Ying	(South Korea) Chung Myung-hee (South Korea) Hwang Hye-young	15–4, 15–9	(gold) Winner
1989	Malaysia Open	(China) Lin Ying	(South Korea) Chung So-young (South Korea) Hwang Hye-young	15–4, 15–4	(gold) Winner
1989	Thailand Open	(China) Lin Ying	(South Korea) Chung So-young (South Korea) Hwang Hye-young	5–15, 18–17, 15–9	(gold) Winner
1989	Hong Kong Open	(China) Lin Ying	(South Korea) Chung So-young (South Korea) Hwang Hye-young	15–4, 15–9	(gold) Winner
1989	China Open	(China) Lin Ying	(China) Sun Xiaoqing (China) Zhou Lei	12–15, 15–5, 15–4	(gold) Winner
1989	Denmark Open	(China) Lin Ying	(England) Gillian Clark (England) Gillian Gowers	15–1, 15–3	(gold) Winner
1991	Japan Open	(China) Nong Qunhua	(England) Gillian Clark (England) Gillian Gowers	15–6, 15–18, 9–15	(silver) Runner-up
1991	China Open	(China) Nong Qunhua	(South Korea) Chung Myung-hee (South Korea) Hwang Hye-young	5–15, 3–15	(silver) Runner-up
1992	All England Open	(China) Nong Qunhua	(China) Lin Yanfen (China) Yao Fen	14–18, 17–18	(silver) Runner-up

=== Invitational tournament ===
Women's doubles
Year	Tournament	Partner	Opponent	Score	Result
1989	Konica Cup	(China) Lin Ying	(South Korea) Chung Myung-hee (South Korea) Hwang Hye-young	15–6, 15–8	(gold) Winner

=== International tournament ===
Women's singles
Year	Tournament	Opponent	Score	Result
1982	Victor Cup	(England) Sally Podger	11–3, 11–4	(gold) Winner

Women's singles
Year	Tournament	Partner	Opponent	Score	Result
1982	Victor Cup	(China) Chen Minhua	(England) Nora Perry (England) Jane Webster	15–11, 9–15, 5–15	(silver) Runner-up
