= 1990 Badminton World Cup =

Badminton championships

Tournament details
- Dates: 14–18 November 1990
- Edition: 12th
- Total prize money: US$140,000
- Venue: Istora Senayan
- Location: Bandung & Jakarta, Indonesia

The 1990 Badminton World Cup was the twelfth edition of an international tournament Badminton World Cup. The event was held from 14 November to 18 November 1990. Competitions for group stage were conducted in Bandung while final matches were scheduled for Istora Senayan in Jakarta. Indonesia won the women's singles and mixed doubles events while China won the men's singles & women's doubles categories. Malaysia secured a title in men's doubles discipline.

== Medalists ==
Event	Gold	Silver	Bronze
Men's singles	(China) Wu Wenkai	(China) Zhao Jianhua	(China) Yang Yang
Men's singles	(China) Wu Wenkai	(China) Zhao Jianhua	(Indonesia) Ardy Wiranata
Women's singles	(Indonesia) Sarwendah Kusumawardhani	(Indonesia) Susi Susanti	(China) Tang Jiuhong
Women's singles	(Indonesia) Sarwendah Kusumawardhani	(Indonesia) Susi Susanti	(China) Huang Hua
Men's doubles	(Malaysia) Jalani Sidek (Malaysia) Razif Sidek	(Indonesia) Eddy Hartono (Indonesia) Rudy Gunawan	(China) Li Yongbo (China) Tian Bingyi
Men's doubles	(Malaysia) Jalani Sidek (Malaysia) Razif Sidek	(Indonesia) Eddy Hartono (Indonesia) Rudy Gunawan	(Malaysia) Cheah Soon Kit (Malaysia) Soo Beng Kiang
Women's doubles	(China) Lai Caiqin (China) Yao Fen	(Indonesia) Erma Sulistianingsih (Indonesia) Rosiana Tendean	(South Korea) Chung So-young (South Korea) Hwang Hye-young
Women's doubles	(China) Lai Caiqin (China) Yao Fen	(Indonesia) Erma Sulistianingsih (Indonesia) Rosiana Tendean	(Netherlands) Eline Coene (Netherlands) Erica van den Heuvel
Mixed doubles	(Indonesia) Rudy Gunawan (Indonesia) Rosiana Tendean	(Denmark) Jan Paulsen (England) Gillian Gowers	(Denmark) Henrik Svarrer (England) Gillian Clark
Mixed doubles	(Indonesia) Rudy Gunawan (Indonesia) Rosiana Tendean	(Denmark) Jan Paulsen (England) Gillian Gowers	(Indonesia) Aryono Miranat (Indonesia) Erma Sulistianingsih

== Men's singles ==
=== Finals ===
Semi-finals
(China) Zhao Jianhua	15	14	18
(Indonesia) Ardy Wiranata	10	15	16
(China) Wu Wenkai	15	15
(China) Yang Yang	12	9

Final
(China) Zhao Jianhua	6	7
(China) Wu Wenkai	15	15

== Women's singles ==
=== Finals ===
Semi-finals
(China) Tang Jiuhong	10	11	4
(Indonesia) Sarwendah Kusumawardhani	12	6	11
(China) Huang Hua	8	11	2
(Indonesia) Susi Susanti	11	1	11

Final
(Indonesia) Sarwendah Kusumawardhani	11	1	12
(Indonesia) Susi Susanti	5	11	11

== Men's doubles ==
=== Finals ===
Semi-finals
(Malaysia) Jalani Sidek (Malaysia) Razif Sidek	15	15
(China) Li Yongbo (China) Tian Bingyi	12	3
(Malaysia) Cheah Soon Kit (Malaysia) Soo Beng Kiang	13	13
(Indonesia) Eddy Hartono (Indonesia) Rudy Gunawan	18	18

Final
(Malaysia) Jalani Sidek (Malaysia) Razif Sidek	14	15	15
(Indonesia) Eddy Hartono (Indonesia) Rudy Gunawan	17	8	7

== Women's doubles ==
=== Finals ===
Semi-finals
(China) Lai Caiqin (China) Yao Fen	12	15	15
(South Korea) Chung So-young (South Korea) Hwang Hye-young	15	7	10
(Indonesia) Erma Sulistianingsih (Indonesia) Rosiana Tendean	15	15
(Netherlands) Eline Coene (Netherlands) Erica van den Heuvel	9	8

Final
(China) Lai Caiqin (China) Yao Fen	3	15	15
(Indonesia) Erma Sulistianingsih (Indonesia) Rosiana Tendean	15	10	4

== Mixed doubles ==
=== Finals ===
Semi-finals
(Indonesia) Rudy Gunawan (Indonesia) Rosiana Tendean	15	15
(Denmark) Henrik Svarrer (England) Gillian Clark	11	9
(Indonesia) Aryono Miranat (Indonesia) Erma Sulistianingsih	8	4
(Denmark) Jan Paulsen (England) Gillian Gowers	15	15

Final
(Indonesia) Rudy Gunawan (Indonesia) Rosiana Tendean	11	15	15
(Denmark) Jan Paulsen (England) Gillian Gowers	15	9	3
