= 1993 Sudirman Cup =

Tournament details
- Dates: 25 May – 30 May
- Edition: 3rd
- Venue: National Indoor Arena
- Location: Birmingham, England

The 1993 Sudirman Cup was the third tournament of the World Mixed Team Badminton Championships. It was held from May 24 to May 30, 1993 at the National Indoor Arena in Birmingham, England.

== Results ==
Nigeria and Spain entered but did not participate.

=== Group 1 ===
==== Subgroup A ====
Team one	Team two	Score
China	Sweden	5–0
South Korea	China	4–1
South Korea	Sweden	3–2

China
5
Birmingham, England
25 May 1993

Sweden
0

			1	2	3
1	(China) (Sweden)	Tang Jiuhong; Christine Magnusson	11; 0	11; 6
2	(China) (Sweden)	Wu Wenkai; Jens Olsson	12; 15	15; 4	17; 16
3	(China) (Sweden)	Chen Hongyong / Chen Kang; Peter Axelsson / Pär-Gunnar Jönsson	15; 5	15; 11
4	(China) (Sweden)	Lin Yanfen / Yao Fen; Lim Xiaoqing / Christine Magnusson	15; 6	18; 16
5	(China) (Sweden)	Zhao Jianhua / Zhu Aihua; Jan-Eric Antonsson / Maria Bengtsson	15; 11	15; 13

South Korea
4
Birmingham, England
26 May 1993

China
1

			1	2	3
1	(South Korea) (China)	Park Joo-bong / Gil Young-ah; Zhao Jianhua / Zhu Aihua	14; 17	15; 9	15; 5
2	(South Korea) (China)	Bang Soo-hyun; Ye Zhaoying	6; 11	0; 11
3	(South Korea) (China)	Kim Hak-kyun; Liu Jun	15; 10	18; 16
4	(South Korea) (China)	Kim Moon-soo / Park Joo-bong; Chen Hongyong / Chen Kang	15; 9	15; 8
5	(South Korea) (China)	Chung So-young / Gil Young-ah; Nong Qunhua / Zhou Lei	17; 14	15; 13

South Korea
3
Birmingham, England
27 May 1993

Sweden
2

			1	2	3
1	(South Korea) (Sweden)	Park Joo-bong / Gil Young-ah; Pär-Gunnar Jönsson / Maria Bengtsson	15; 8	15; 4
2	(South Korea) (Sweden)	Bang Soo-hyun; Christine Magnusson	10; 12	11; 3	5; 11
3	(South Korea) (Sweden)	Park Sung-woo; Jens Olsson	5; 15	15; 8	15; 9
4	(South Korea) (Sweden)	Kim Moon-soo / Shon Jin-hwan; Peter Axelsson / Pär-Gunnar Jönsson	15; 7	9; 15	7; 15
5	(South Korea) (Sweden)	Chung So-young / Gil Young-ah; Catrine Bengtsson / Maria Bengtsson	15; 10	15; 10

==== Subgroup B ====
Team one	Team two	Score
Denmark	England	5–0
Indonesia	Denmark	3–2
Indonesia	England	5–0

Denmark
5
Birmingham, England
25 May 1993

England
0

			1	2	3
1	(Denmark) (England)	Thomas Lund / Marlene Thomsen; Nick Ponting / Gillian Clark	15; 4	15; 5
2	(Denmark) (England)	Pernille Nedergaard; Suzanne Louis-Lane	11; 4	11; 8
3	(Denmark) (England)	Thomas Stuer-Lauridsen; Peter Knowles	15; 6	15; 1
4	(Denmark) (England)	Lotte Olsen / Lisbet Stuer-Lauridsen; Gillian Clark / Gillian Gowers	16; 18	18; 14	15; 7
5	(Denmark) (England)	Jon Holst-Christensen / Thomas Lund; Julian Robertson / Dave Wright	15; 12	15; 10

Indonesia
3
Birmingham, England
26 May 1993

Denmark
2

			1	2	3
1	(Indonesia) (Denmark)	Joko Suprianto; Poul-Erik Høyer Larsen	14; 17	9; 15
2	(Indonesia) (Denmark)	Sarwendah Kusumawardhani; Anne Søndergaard	11; 2	11; 5
3	(Indonesia) (Denmark)	Finarsih / Lili Tampi; Anne Mette Bille / Marlene Thomsen	15; 5	15; 10
4	(Indonesia) (Denmark)	Denny Kantono / Ricky Subagja; Jan Paulsen / Michael Søgaard	15; 2	15; 1
5	(Indonesia) (Denmark)	Rudy Gunawan / Rosiana Tendean; Jon Holst-Christensen / Grete Mogensen	4; 15	8; 15

Indonesia
5
Birmingham, England
27 May 1993

England
0

			1	2	3
1	(Indonesia) (England)	Hariyanto Arbi; Anders Nielsen	15; 12	15; 10
2	(Indonesia) (England)	Aryono Miranat / Eliza Nathanael; Simon Archer / Joanne Wright	15; 13	15; 9
3	(Indonesia) (England)	Minarti Timur; Fiona Smith	11; 4	11; 4
4	(Indonesia) (England)	Eliza Nathanael / Zelin Resiana; Gillian Clark / Gillian Gowers	12; 15	15; 11	15; 7
5	(Indonesia) (England)	Rudy Gunawan / Ricky Subagja; Chris Hunt / Nick Ponting	15; 8	15; 9

==== Relegation playoff ====
Team one	Team two	Score
England	Sweden	3–2

==== Semi-finals ====
Team one	Team two	Score
Indonesia	China	3–2
South Korea	Denmark	3–2

South Korea
3
Birmingham, England
28 May 1993

Denmark
2

			1	2	3
1	(South Korea) (Denmark)	Park Joo-bong / Gil Young-ah; Thomas Lund / Marlene Thomsen	16; 18	14; 18
2	(South Korea) (Denmark)	Lee Heung-soon; Pernille Nedergaard	5; 11	11; 3	12; 9
3	(South Korea) (Denmark)	Park Sung-woo; Thomas Stuer-Lauridsen	4; 15	10; 15
4	(South Korea) (Denmark)	Chung So-young / Gil Young-ah; Lotte Olsen / Lisbet Stuer-Lauridsen	18; 16	6; 15	15; 12
5	(South Korea) (Denmark)	Kim Moon-soo / Park Joo-bong; Jon Holst-Christensen / Thomas Lund	18; 16	15; 10

Indonesia
3
Birmingham, England
29 May 1993

China
2

			1	2	3
1	(Indonesia) (China)	Susi Susanti; Ye Zhaoying	11; 6	5; 11	11; 8
2	(Indonesia) (China)	Heryanto Arbi; Wu Wenkai	9; 15	8; 15
3	(Indonesia) (China)	Finarsih / Lili Tampi; Lin Yanfen / Yao Fen	10; 15	18; 16	15; 1
4	(Indonesia) (China)	Rudy Gunawan / Ricky Subagja; Chen Hongyong / Chen Kang	18; 13	15; 7
5	(Indonesia) (China)	Denny Kantono / Rosiana Tendean; Zhao Jianhua / Sun Man	15; 10	15; 18	8; 15

==== Final ====
Team one	Team two	Score
South Korea	Indonesia	3–2

South Korea
3
Birmingham, England
30 May 1993

Indonesia
2

			1	2	3
1	(South Korea) (Indonesia)	Park Joo-bong / Gil Young-ah; Aryono Miranat / Eliza Nathanael	15; 2	15; 7
2	(South Korea) (Indonesia)	Kim Hak-kyun; Ardy Wiranata	11; 15	7; 15
3	(South Korea) (Indonesia)	Bang Soo-hyun; Susi Susanti	6; 11	6; 11
4	(South Korea) (Indonesia)	Chung So-young / Gil Young-ah; Finarsih / Lili Tampi	6; 15	17; 15	15; 11
5	(South Korea) (Indonesia)	Kim Moon-soo / Park Joo-bong; Rudy Gunawan / Ricky Subagja	15; 10	15; 6

1993 Sudirman Cup Champions

South Korea
Second title

=== Group 2 ===
Team one	Team two	Score
Thailand	Netherlands	3-2
Thailand	Japan	3-2
Thailand	Malaysia	3-2
Netherlands	Japan	3-2
Netherlands	Malaysia	4-1
Japan	Malaysia	3-2

=== Group 3 ===
Team one	Team two	Score
Russia	Canada	4-1
Russia	Scotland	5-0
Russia	Australia	3-2
Canada	Scotland	5-0
Canada	Australia	3-2
Scotland	Australia	3-2

=== Group 4 ===
Team one	Team two	Score
Germany	New Zealand	3-2
Germany	Hong Kong	4-1
Germany	India	3-2
New Zealand	Hong Kong	3-2
New Zealand	India	3-2
Hong Kong	India	4-1

=== Group 5 ===
Team one	Team two	Score
Austria	Norway	3-2
Austria	Finland	4-1
Austria	Poland	3-2
Norway	Finland	3-2
Norway	Poland	4-1
Finland	Poland	3-2

=== Group 6 ===
Team one	Team two	Score
Czech Republic	Iceland	5-0
Czech Republic	United States	3-2
Czech Republic	(Republic of Ireland) Ireland	4-1
Iceland	United States	4-1
Iceland	(Republic of Ireland) Ireland	3-2
United States	(Republic of Ireland) Ireland	3-2

=== Group 7 ===
Team one	Team two	Score
Switzerland	Bulgaria	4-1
Switzerland	France	4-1
Switzerland	Wales	3-2
Bulgaria	France	3-2
Bulgaria	Wales	3-2
France	Wales	1-4

=== Group 8 ===
Team one	Team two	Score
Ukraine	Kazakhstan	3-2
Ukraine	Hungary	4-1
Ukraine	Belgium	5-0
Ukraine	Pakistan	5-0
Kazakhstan	Hungary	5-0
Kazakhstan	Belgium	5-0
Kazakhstan	Pakistan	4-1
Hungary	Belgium	3-2
Hungary	Pakistan	4-1
Belgium	Pakistan	4-1

=== Group 9 ===
Team one	Team two	Score
Peru	Slovenia	5-0
Peru	Cyprus	5-0
Peru	Israel	3-2
Peru	Malta	5-0
Slovenia	Cyprus	5-0
Slovenia	Israel	3-2
Slovenia	Malta	4-1
Cyprus	Israel	3-2
Cyprus	Malta	3-2
Israel	Malta	3-2

== Final classification ==
Group 1
Pos	Country
1	South Korea
2	Indonesia
3	China
3	Denmark
5	England
6	Sweden

Group 2
Pos	Country
7	Thailand
8	Netherlands
9	Japan
10	Malaysia

Group 3
Pos	Country
11	Russia
12	Canada
13	Scotland
14	Australia

Group 4
Pos	Country
15	Germany
16	New Zealand
17	Hong Kong
18	India

Group 5
Pos	Country
19	Austria
20	Finland
21	Norway
22	Poland

Group 6
Pos	Country
23	Czech Republic
24	Iceland
25	United States
26	Ireland

Group 7
Pos	Country
27	Switzerland
28	Bulgaria
29	Wales
30	France

Group 8
Pos	Country
31	Ukraine
32	Kazakhstan
33	Hungary
34	Belgium
35	Pakistan

Group 9
Pos	Country
36	Peru
37	Slovenia
38	Cyprus
39	Israel
40	Malta

Promoted to higher group
Relegated to lower group
