= Yao Fen =

Chinese badminton player

Yao Fen 姚芬
Personal information
- Born: 2 January 1967 (age 59) Sanya, Hainan, China
- Height: 166 cm (5 ft 5 in)

Sport
- Country: China
- Sport: Badminton
- Handedness: Right
Medal record
Women's badminton
Representing China
Olympic Games
Bronze medal – third place	1992 Barcelona	Women's doubles
World Cup
Gold medal – first place	1990 Bandung-Jakarta	Women's doubles
Gold medal – first place	1992 Guangzhou	Women's doubles
Bronze medal – third place	1991 Macau	Women's doubles
Bronze medal – third place	1993 New Delhi	Women's doubles
Sudirman Cup
Bronze medal – third place	1991 Copenhagen	Mixed team
Bronze medal – third place	1993 Birmingham	Mixed team
Uber Cup
Gold medal – first place	1990 Tokyo	Women's team
Gold medal – first place	1992 Kuala Lumpur	Women's team
Asian Games
Gold medal – first place	1990 Beijing	Women's team
Bronze medal – third place	1990 Beijing	Women's doubles
Asian Cup
Bronze medal – third place	1991 Jakarta	Women's doubles

Yao Fen (Chinese: 姚芬; born 2 January 1967) is a Chinese international level women's badminton player.

== Career ==
A doubles specialist, Yao won a number of top tier events on the world circuit in the early 1990s. Her earliest international success came in partnership with Lai Caiqin with whom she captured women's doubles' titles at the Japan and Thailand Opens and the Badminton World Cup in 1990. In her most successful season, 1992, she paired with Lin Yanfen to win the China and Swedish Opens, the Badminton World Cup, the World Badminton Grand Prix, and the prestigious All-England Championships. Yao and Lin were bronze medalists at the 1992 Olympic Games in Barcelona and played doubles for China's world champion 1992 Uber Cup (women's international) team. In 1993 they won the French Open women's doubles and were runners-up in defense of their title at the All England Championships.

== Achievements ==
=== Olympic Games ===
Women's doubles
Year	Venue	Partner	Opponent	Score	Result
1992	Pavelló de la Mar Bella, Barcelona, Spain	(China) Lin Yanfen	(South Korea) Chung So-young (South Korea) Hwang Hye-young	9–15, 8–15	Bronze

=== World Cup ===
Women's doubles
Year	Venue	Partner	Opponent	Score	Result
1990	Istora Senayan, Jakarta, Indonesia	(China) Lai Caiqin	(Indonesia) Erma Sulistianingsih (Indonesia) Rosiana Tendean	3–15, 15–10, 15–4	Gold
1991	Macau Forum, Macau	(China) Lai Caiqin	(Indonesia) Erma Sulistianingsih (Indonesia) Rosiana Tendean	10–15, 15–12, 7–15	Bronze
1992	Guangdong Gymnasium, Guangzhou, China	(China) Lin Yanfen	(England) Gillian Gowers (England) Sara Sankey	15–0, 15–3	Gold
1993	Indira Gandhi Indoor Stadium, New Delhi, India	(China) Lin Yanfen	(South Korea) Chung So-young (South Korea) Gil Young-ah	9–15, 10–15	Bronze

=== Asian Games ===
Women's doubles
Year	Venue	Partner	Opponent	Score	Result
1990	Beijing Gymnasium, Beijing, China	(China) Lai Caiqin	(South Korea) Chung So-young (South Korea) Gil Young-ah	8–15, 10–15	Bronze

=== Asian Cup ===
Women's doubles
Year	Venue	Partner	Opponent	Score	Result
1991	Istora Senayan, Jakarta, Indonesia	(China) Lin Yanfen	(Japan) Kimiko Jinnai (Japan) Hisako Mori	15–10, 14–17, 1–15	Bronze

=== IBF World Grand Prix (10 titles, 4 runners-up) ===
The World Badminton Grand Prix sanctioned by International Badminton Federation (IBF) from 1983 to 2006.

Women's singles
Year	Tournament	Opponent	Score	Result
1986	Carlton-Intersport Cup	(Denmark) Kirsten Larsen	11–7, 11–7	(gold) Winner
1986	English Masters	(Japan) Sumiko Kitada	1–11, 11–2, 11–0	(gold) Winner

Women's doubles
Year	Tournament	Partner	Opponent	Score	Result
1990	Japan Open	(China) Lai Caiqin	(Japan) Kimiko Jinnai (Japan) Hisako Mori	7–15, 15–9, 15–10	(gold) Winner
1990	Thailand Open	(China) Lai Caiqin	(South Korea) Chung Myung-hee (South Korea) Chung So-young	15–11, 10–15, 15–12	(gold) Winner
1990	Malaysia Open	(China) Lai Caiqin	(South Korea) Chung Myung-hee (South Korea) Chung So-young	15–7, 9–15, 9–15	(silver) Runner-up
1990	Grand Prix Finals	(China) Lai Caiqin	(Indonesia) Erma Sulistianingsih (Indonesia) Rosiana Tendean	18–14, 15–10	(gold) Winner
1991	German Open	(China) Lin Yanfen	(Sweden) Lim Xiaoqing (Sweden) Christine Magnusson	11–15, 15–17	(silver) Runner-up
1992	Swedish Open	(China) Lin Yanfen	(Sweden) Catrine Bengtsson (Sweden) Maria Bengtsson	15–6, 17–16	(gold) Winner
1992	All England Open	(China) Lin Yanfen	(China) Guan Weizhen (China) Nong Qunhua	18–14, 18–17	(gold) Winner
1992	China Open	(China) Lin Yanfen	(China) Pan Li (China) Wu Yuhong	17–14, 15–4	(gold) Winner
1992	Grand Prix Finals	(China) Lin Yanfen	(England) Gillian Clark (England) Gillian Gowers	15–7, 17–16	(gold) Winner
1993	Korea Open	(China) Lin Yanfen	(South Korea) Chung So-young (South Korea) Gil Young-ah	8–15, 5–15	(silver) Runner-up
1993	All England Open	(China) Lin Yanfen	(South Korea) Chung So-young (South Korea) Gil Young-ah	15–5, 4–15, 7–15	(silver) Runner-up
1993	French Open	(China) Lin Yanfen	(China) Nong Qunhua (China) Zhou Lei	15–10, 17–15	(gold) Winner

=== IBF International ===
Women's doubles
Year	Tournament	Partner	Opponent	Score	Result
1984	Polish Open	(China) Lai Caiqin	(China) Gao Maifeng (China) Nong Qunhua	9–15, 12–15	(silver) Runner-up
