= Lai Caiqin =

Chinese badminton player

Lai Caiqin 赖彩勤
Personal information
- Born: 5 December 1966 (age 59) Meixian district, Guangdong, China
- Height: 1.65 m (5 ft 5 in)

Sport
- Country: China
- Sport: Badminton
- Handedness: Right
- Event: Doubles

Doubles
- BWF profile
Medal record
Women's badminton
Representing China
World Cup
Gold medal – first place	1990 Jakarta	Women's doubles
Bronze medal – third place	1991 Macau	Women's doubles
Sudirman Cup
Bronze medal – third place	1991 Copenhagen	Mixed team
Uber Cup
Gold medal – first place	1990 Tokyo	Women's team
Asian Games
Gold medal – first place	1990 Beijing	Women's team
Bronze medal – third place	1990 Beijing	Women's doubles

Lai Caiqin (Chinese: 赖彩勤, born 5 December 1966) is a former Chinese badminton player.

== Career ==
Caiqin joined the Guangdong Badminton Team in 1981. Thereafter, she joined the national badminton team in 1989. In 1990 and 1991, she won the 13th Uber Cup Championship and the third place in the second Sudirman Cup. She had also won the Sports Medal of Honor. Lai throughout her career has medalled in prominent competitions such as Sudirman Cup, Uber Cup, World Cup & Asian Games. Most importantly, she won the 1990 World Cup Gold medal in Women's doubles. She also represented her country twice in World Championships in 1989 & 1991; both the times reaching Quarterfinal stage. She moved to Singapore after retiring from professional career and has since established a coaching academy through achieving notable results in inter-school tournaments (from Primary to Varsity levels).

== Achievements ==
=== World Cup ===
Women's doubles
Year	Venue	Partner	Opponent	Score	Result
1990	Istora Senayan, Jakarta, Indonesia	(China) Yao Fen	(Indonesia) Erma Sulistianingsih (Indonesia) Rosiana Tendean	3–15, 15–10, 15–4	Gold
1991	Macau Forum, Macau	(China) Yao Fen	(Indonesia) Erma Sulistianingsih (Indonesia) Rosiana Tendean	10–15, 15–12, 7–15	Bronze

=== Asian Games ===
Women's doubles
Year	Venue	Partner	Opponent	Score	Result
1990	Beijing Gymnasium, Beijing, China	(China) Yao Fen	(South Korea) Chung So-young (South Korea) Gil Young-ah	8–15, 10–15	Bronze

=== IBF World Grand Prix ===
The World Badminton Grand Prix sanctioned by International Badminton Federation (IBF) from 1983 to 2006.

Women's doubles
Year	Tournament	Partner	Opponent	Score	Result
1990	Japan Open	(China) Yao Fen	(Japan) Kimiko Jinnai (Japan) Hisako Mori	7–15, 15–9, 15–10	(gold) Winner
1990	Thailand Open	(China) Yao Fen	(South Korea) Chung Myung-hee (South Korea) Chung So-young	15–11, 10–15, 15–12	(gold) Winner
1990	Malaysia Open	(China) Yao Fen	(South Korea) Chung Myung-hee (South Korea) Chung So-young	15–7, 9–15, 9–15	(silver) Runner-up
1990	Grand Prix Finals	(China) Yao Fen	(Indonesia) Erma Sulistianingsih (Indonesia) Rosiana Tendean	18–14, 15–10	(gold) Winner

=== IBF International ===
Women's doubles
Year	Tournament	Partner	Opponent	Score	Result
1984	Polish Open	(China) Yao Fen	(China) Gao Maifeng (China) Nong Qunhua	9–15, 12–15	(silver) Runner-up
