= Nong Qunhua =

Chinese badminton player

Nong Qunhua 农群华
Personal information
- Born: 20 July 1966 (age 60) Nanning, Guangxi, China
- Height: 165 cm (5 ft 5 in)

Sport
- Country: China
- Sport: Badminton
- Event: Women's doubles
Medal record
Women's badminton
Representing China
Olympic Games
Silver medal – second place	1992 Barcelona	Women's doubles
World Championships
Gold medal – first place	1991 Copenhagen	Women's doubles
Gold medal – first place	1993 Birmingham	Women's doubles
World Cup
Bronze medal – third place	1989 Guangzhou	Mixed doubles
Sudirman Cup
Bronze medal – third place	1989 Jakarta	Mixed team
Bronze medal – third place	1991 Copenhagen	Mixed team
Bronze medal – third place	1993 Birmingham	Mixed team
Uber Cup
Gold medal – first place	1990 Tokyo	Women's team
Gold medal – first place	1992 Kuala Lumpur	Women's team
Asian Games
Gold medal – first place	1990 Beijing	Women's doubles
Gold medal – first place	1990 Beijing	Women's team

Nong Qunhua (Chinese: 农群华; born July 20, 1966) is a Chinese badminton player who specialized in the women's doubles.

== Career ==
Nong was one of the world's leading women's doubles players of the early 1990s, winning the IBF World Championships in 1991 with Guan Weizhen and in 1993 with Zhou Lei. With Guan, Nong also won the 1990 Asian Games, was a silver medalist at the 1992 Olympics in Barcelona, and was a runner-up at the 1992 All England Championships. With Zhou Lei she won the Thailand and Hong Kong Opens in 1992. Nong was a member of world champion Chinese Uber Cup (women's international) teams in 1990 and 1992

== Achievements ==
=== Olympic Games ===
Women's doubles
Year	Venue	Partner	Opponent	Score	Result
1992	Pavelló de la Mar Bella, Barcelona, Spain	(China) Guan Weizhen	(South Korea) Chung So-young (South Korea) Hwang Hye-young	16–18, 15–12, 13–15	Silver

=== World Championships ===
Women's doubles
Year	Venue	Partner	Opponent	Score	Result
1991	Brøndby Arena, Copenhagen, Denmark	(China) Guan Weizhen	(Sweden) Maria Bengtsson (Sweden) Christine Magnusson	15–7, 15–4	Gold
1993	National Indoor Arena, Birmingham, England	(China) Zhou Lei	(China) Chen Ying (China) Wu Yuhong	15–5, 15–10	Gold

=== World Cup ===
Mixed doubles
Year	Venue	Partner	Opponent	Score	Result
1989	Canton Gymnasium, Guangzhou, China	(China) Jiang Guoliang	(South Korea) Kim Moon-soo (South Korea) Chung So-young	7–15, 12–15	Bronze

=== Asian Games ===
Women's doubles
Year	Venue	Partner	Opponent	Score	Result
1990	Beijing Gymnasium, Beijing, China	(China) Guan Weizhen	(South Korea) Chung So-young (South Korea) Gil Young-ah	15–11, 15–4	Gold

=== IBF World Grand Prix ===
The World Badminton Grand Prix sanctioned by International Badminton Federation (IBF) from 1983 to 2006.

Women's doubles
Year	Tournament	Partner	Opponent	Score	Result
1991	Japan Open	(China) Guan Weizhen	(England) Gillian Clark (England) Gillian Gowers	15–6, 15–18, 9–15	(silver) Runner-up
1991	China Open	(China) Guan Weizhen	(South Korea) Chung Myung-hee (South Korea) Hwang Hye-young	5–15, 3–15	(silver) Runner-up
1992	All England Open	(China) Guan Weizhen	(China) Lin Yanfen (China) Yao Fen	14–18, 17–18	(silver) Runner-up
1992	Hong Kong Open	(China) Zhou Lei	(Indonesia) Erma Sulistianingsih (Indonesia) Rosiana Tendean	15–8, 15–6	(gold) Winner
1992	Thailand Open	(China) Zhou Lei	(Indonesia) Erma Sulistianingsih (Indonesia) Rosiana Tendean	15–4, 12–15, 15–8	(gold) Winner
1993	French Open	(China) Zhou Lei	(China) Lin Yanfen (China) Yao Fen	10–15, 15–17	(silver) Runner-Up

Mixed doubles
Year	Tournament	Partner	Opponent	Score	Result
1987	Hong Kong Open	(China) Jiang Guoliang	(Scotland) Billy Gilliland (England) Gillian Gowers	14–18, 15–13, 7–15	(silver) Runner-Up
1989	French Open	(China) Jiang Guoliang	(China) Wang Pengren (China) Shi Fangjing	15–12, 5–15, 11–15	(silver) Runner-Up
