= Badminton at the 1992 Summer Olympics =

Badminton at the Games of the XXV Olympiad
- Venue: Pavelló de la Mar Bella
- Dates: 28 July – 4 August 1992
- No. of events: 4 (2 men, 2 women)
- Competitors: 177 from 36 nations

Badminton had its debut as an official medal sport at the 1992 Summer Olympics. It was held from 28 July to 4 August 1992. Four events were held in the first competition of the sport: men's singles, women's singles, men's doubles, and women's doubles. Badminton was contested in the Pavelló de la Mar Bella. 36 nations entered competitors, with a total of 177 entrants. Asian nations won fifteen of the sixteen medals, with their dominance being broken only by Denmark's bronze medal in the men's singles.

The tournament was single-elimination. Matches consisted of three sets, with sets being to 15 except in women's singles, where sets were to 11. No playoffs were contested for semi-final losers, meaning that two bronze medals were awarded in each event. Similarly, all four players/pairs defeated in the quarterfinals for each event were awarded fifth place.

== Medallists ==
Event	Gold	Silver	Bronze
Men's singles	Alan Budikusuma; Indonesia	Ardy Wiranata; Indonesia	Thomas Stuer-Lauridsen; Denmark
Men's singles	Alan Budikusuma; Indonesia	Ardy Wiranata; Indonesia	Hermawan Susanto; Indonesia
Women's singles	Susi Susanti; Indonesia	Bang Soo-hyun; South Korea	Huang Hua; China
Women's singles	Susi Susanti; Indonesia	Bang Soo-hyun; South Korea	Tang Jiuhong; China
Men's doubles	South Korea; Kim Moon-soo; Park Joo-bong	Indonesia; Eddy Hartono; Rudy Gunawan	China; Li Yongbo; Tian Bingyi
Men's doubles	South Korea; Kim Moon-soo; Park Joo-bong	Indonesia; Eddy Hartono; Rudy Gunawan	Malaysia; Razif Sidek; Jalani Sidek
Women's doubles	South Korea; Hwang Hye-young; Chung So-young	China; Guan Weizhen; Nong Qunhua	South Korea; Gil Young-ah; Shim Eun-jung
Women's doubles	South Korea; Hwang Hye-young; Chung So-young	China; Guan Weizhen; Nong Qunhua	China; Lin Yanfen; Yao Fen

== Medal table ==
In 1992, there were no bronze medal matches to decide 3rd and 4th place. Both semifinal losers won bronze medals.

Rank	Nation	Gold	Silver	Bronze	Total
1	Indonesia	2	2	1	5
2	South Korea	2	1	1	4
3	China	0	1	4	5
4	Denmark	0	0	1	1
4	Malaysia	0	0	1	1
Totals (5 entries)		4	4	8	16

== Results ==
=== Men's singles ===
The men's singles resulted in the only non-Asian medallist, Thomas Stuer-Lauridsen of Denmark. 57 players from 32 nations competed in men's singles.

Quarterfinals
(China) Zhao Jianhua	2	17	14
(Indonesia) Hermawan Susanto	15	14	17
(Indonesia) Ardy Wiranata	15	15
(Denmark) Høyer Larsen	10	12
(Indonesia) Alan Budikusuma	15	15
(South Korea) Kim Hak-kyun	9	4
(Denmark) Thomas Stuer-Lauridsen	15	15
(Malaysia) Rashid Sidek	2	8

Semifinals
(Indonesia) Hermawan Susanto	15	9	9
(Indonesia) Ardy Wiranata	10	15	15
(Indonesia) Alan Budikusuma	18	15
(Denmark) Thomas Stuer-Lauridsen	14	8

Finals
(Indonesia) Ardy Wiranata	12	13
(Indonesia) Alan Budikusuma	15	18

=== Women's singles ===
The winner of the women's singles competition received the first official badminton medal in Olympic history. It was also the first gold medal for Indonesia, which before had only won one silver (in archery). 52 players from 27 nations competed in women's singles.

Quarterfinals
(Indonesia) Susi Susanti	11	11
(Thailand) Somharuthai Jaroensiri	6	1
(China) Huang Hua	11	10	11
(South Korea) Lee Heung-soon	3	12	0
(Indonesia) Sarwendah Kusumawardhani	2	11	11
(South Korea) Bang Soo-hyun	11	3	12
(Australia) Anna Lao	1	9
(China) Tang Jiuhong	11	11

Semifinals
(Indonesia) Susi Susanti	11	11
(China) Huang Hua	4	1
(South Korea) Bang Soo-hyun	11	11
(China) Tang Jiuhong	3	2

Finals
(Indonesia) Susi Susanti	5	11	11
(South Korea) Bang Soo-hyun	11	5	3

=== Men's doubles ===
Malaysia won its first Olympic medal in the men's doubles competitions in badminton. 30 pairs from 21 nations competed in men's doubles.

Quarterfinals

Semifinals

Finals

- (South Korea) Kim Moon-soo
- (South Korea) Park Joo-bong
15
15

- (Indonesia) Rexy Mainaky
- (Indonesia) Ricky Subagja
7
4

- (South Korea) Kim Moon-soo
- (South Korea) Park Joo-bong
15
15

- (Malaysia) Razif Sidek
- (Malaysia) Jalani Sidek
11
13

- (Malaysia) Razif Sidek
- (Malaysia) Jalani Sidek
15
15

- (Japan) Shuji Matsuno
- (Japan) Shinji Matsuura
5
4

- (South Korea) Kim Moon-soo
- (South Korea) Park Joo-bong
15
15

- (Indonesia) Eddy Hartono
- (Indonesia) Rudy Gunawan
11
7

- (China) Li Yongbo
- (China) Tian Bingyi
15
12
17

- (Denmark) Jan Paulsen
- (Denmark) Henrik Svarrer
11
15
14

- (China) Li Yongbo
- (China) Tian Bingyi
9
8

- (Indonesia) Eddy Hartono
- (Indonesia) Rudy Gunawan
15
15

- (Indonesia) Eddy Hartono
- (Indonesia) Rudy Gunawan
15
18

- (South Korea) Lee Sang-bok
- (South Korea) Shon Jin-hwan
4
15

=== Women's doubles ===
29 pairs from 20 nations competed in women's doubles.

Quarterfinals

Semifinals

Finals

- (South Korea) Hwang Hye-young
- (South Korea) Chung So-young
15
15

- (United Kingdom) Julie Bradbury
- (United Kingdom) Gillian Clark
5
5

- (South Korea) Hwang Hye-young
- (South Korea) Chung So-young
15
15

- (China) Lin Yan Fen
- (China) Yao Fen
8
9

- (China) Lin Yan Fen
- (China) Yao Fen
18
15

- (Australia) Anna Lao
- (Australia) Rhonda Cator
13
5

- (South Korea) Hwang Hye-young
- (South Korea) Chung So-young
18
12
15

- (China) Guan Weizhen
- (China) Nong Qunhua
16
15
13

- (South Korea) Gil Young-ah
- (South Korea) Shim Eun-jung
15
15

- (Indonesia) Finarsih
- (Indonesia) Lili Tampi
8
3

- (South Korea) Gil Young-ah
- (South Korea) Shim Eun-jung
12
15
8

- (China) Guan Weizhen
- (China) Nong Qunhua
15
2
15

- (China) Guan Weizhen
- (China) Nong Qunhua
15
15

- (Sweden) Catrine Bengtsson
- (Sweden) Maria Bengtsson
4
9

== Participation ==
A total of 177 badminton players from 36 Olympic Committees (NOCs) from the five Continental Confederations will participate at the 1992 Summer Olympics.

=== Participating nations ===
Below is the list of NOCs participants in badminton competition at the 1992 Summer Olympics.

- Australia (2)
- Austria (2)
- Belgium (1)
- Bulgaria (7)
- Canada (6)
- China (13)
- Czechoslovakia (2)
- Denmark (12)
- Finland (2)
- France (4)
- Germany (4)
- Great Britain (12)
- Hong Kong (5)
- Hungary (3)
- Iceland (3)
- India (3)
- Indonesia (13)
- Japan (11)
- Malaysia (6)
- Mauritius (3)
- Netherlands (3)
- New Zealand (4)
- Norway (1)
- Poland (6)
- Portugal (2)
- Romania (1)
- Singapore (3)
- South Africa (2)
- South Korea (12)
- Spain (2) Host
- Sri Lanka (1)
- Sweden (8)
- Switzerland (2)
- Thailand (8)
- Unified Team (2)
- United States (6)
