= Rosiana Tendean =

Indonesian badminton player (born 1964)

Personal information
- Born: 25 August 1964 (age 62) Makassar, Indonesia

Sport
- Country: Indonesia
- Sport: Badminton
- Event: Women's & mixed doubles

Women's & mixed doubles
- BWF profile
Medal record
Women's badminton
Representing Indonesia
World Cup
Gold medal – first place	1990 Bandung & Jakarta	Mixed doubles
Gold medal – first place	1991 Macau	Mixed doubles
Gold medal – first place	1992 Guangzhou	Mixed doubles
Silver medal – second place	1986 Jakarta	Women's doubles
Silver medal – second place	1990 Bandung–Jakarta	Women's doubles
Silver medal – second place	1991 Macau	Women's doubles
Bronze medal – third place	1985 Jakarta	Women's doubles
Bronze medal – third place	1987 Kuala Lumpur	Women's doubles
Bronze medal – third place	1992 Guangzhou	Women's doubles
World Masters Games
Gold medal – first place	2009 Sydney	Women's doubles 35+
Gold medal – first place	2009 Sydney	Mixed doubles 35+
Bronze medal – third place	2009 Sydney	Mixed doubles 40+
World Senior Championships
Gold medal – first place	2017 Kochi	Mixed doubles 50+
Sudirman Cup
Silver medal – second place	1991 Copenhagen	Mixed team
Silver medal – second place	1993 Birmingham	Mixed team
Uber Cup
Gold medal – first place	1994 Jakarta	Women's team
Silver medal – second place	1986 Jakarta	Women's team
Bronze medal – third place	1990 Nagoya–Tokyo	Women's team
Bronze medal – third place	1992 Kuala Lumpur	Women's team
Asian Games
Silver medal – second place	1990 Beijing	Women's team
Bronze medal – third place	1986 Seoul	Women's doubles
Bronze medal – third place	1986 Seoul	Women's team
Bronze medal – third place	1990 Beijing	Mixed doubles
Asian Cup
Bronze medal – third place	1991 Jakarta	Women's doubles
Southeast Asian Games
Gold medal – first place	1983 Singapore	Women's team
Gold medal – first place	1985 Bangkok	Women's doubles
Gold medal – first place	1985 Bangkok	Women's team
Gold medal – first place	1987 Jakarta	Women's doubles
Gold medal – first place	1987 Jakarta	Women's team
Gold medal – first place	1989 Kuala Lumpur	Women's doubles
Gold medal – first place	1989 Kuala Lumpur	Women's team
Gold medal – first place	1991 Manila	Women's doubles
Gold medal – first place	1991 Manila	Mixed doubles
Gold medal – first place	1991 Manila	Women's team
Silver medal – second place	1983 Singapore	Women's doubles
Silver medal – second place	1985 Bangkok	Mixed doubles

Rosiana Tendean (born 25 August 1964) is an Indonesian retired badminton player.

== Career ==
A doubles specialist, Tendean competed in women's doubles with Erma Sulistianingsih at the 1992 Summer Olympics. Together, they won consecutive World Grand Prix Finals titles in 1989 and 1990, and two Indonesia Open titles in 1989 and 1992. Tendean had also won this title earlier with Ivana Lie in 1987, and in mixed doubles with Rudy Gunawan in 1990 and 1993. Rosiana and Rudy Gunawan won three Badminton World Cups in a row between 1990 and 1992, as well as the Hong Kong and Polish Opens in 1993. She won her first significant international title in women's doubles at the 1985 Southeast Asian Games with the veteran Imelda Wiguna. She was a member of the Indonesian Uber Cup winning team in 1994.

== Achievements ==
=== World Cup ===
Women's doubles
Year	Venue	Partner	Opponent	Score	Result
1985	Istora Senayan, Jakarta, Indonesia	(Indonesia) Imelda Wiguna	(China) Lin Ying (China) Wu Dixi	5–15, 17–14, 10–15	Bronze
1986	Istora Senayan, Jakarta, Indonesia	(Indonesia) Imelda Wiguna	(China) Han Aiping (China) Li Lingwei	7–15, 7–15	Silver
1987	Stadium Negara, Kuala Lumpur, Malaysia	(Indonesia) Verawaty Fadjrin	(China) Han Aiping (China) Li Lingwei	15–3, 10–15, 12–15	Bronze
1990	Istora Senayan, Jakarta, Indonesia	(Indonesia) Erma Sulistianingsih	(China) Lai Caiqin (China) Yao Fen	15–3, 10–15, 4–15	Silver
1991	Macau Forum, Macau	(Indonesia) Erma Sulistianingsih	(South Korea) Chung So-young (South Korea) Hwang Hye-young	3–15, 3–15	Silver
1992	Guangdong Gymnasium, Guangzhou, China	(Indonesia) Erma Sulistianingsih	(England) Gillian Gowers (England) Sara Sankey	15–18, 15–18	Bronze

Mixed doubles
Year	Venue	Partner	Opponent	Score	Result
1990	Istora Senayan, Jakarta, Indonesia	(Indonesia) Rudy Gunawan	(Denmark) Jan Paulsen (England) Gillian Gowers	11–15, 15–9, 15–3	Gold
1991	Macau Forum, Macau	(Indonesia) Rudy Gunawan	(Denmark) Thomas Lund (Denmark) Pernille Dupont	15–10, 15–9	Gold
1992	Guangdong Gymnasium, Guangzhou, China	(Indonesia) Rudy Gunawan	(Denmark) Jan Paulsen (England) Gillian Gowers	17–15, 15–9	Gold

=== World Masters Games ===
Women's doubles

Year	Venue	Event	Partner	Opponent	Score	Result
2009	Sydney, Australia	Women's doubles 35+	(Indonesia) Suzanne Ogeh	(Thailand) Khanittha Maensamut (Thailand) Nudee Pongkhan	15–3, 12–15, 15–11	Gold

Mixed doubles

Year	Venue	Event	Partner	Opponent	Score	Result
2009	Sydney, Australia	Mixed doubles 35+	(Indonesia) Herman Laksono Lioe	(Japan) Masaharu Ito (Japan) Masae Chiba	15–13, 18–17	Gold
2009	Sydney, Australia	Mixed doubles 40+	(Indonesia) Ertanto Kurniawan	(Japan) Shinya Aoki (Japan) Chika Tanifuji	12–15, 15–11, 13–15	Bronze

=== World Senior Championships ===
Mixed doubles

Year	Venue	Event	Partner	Opponent	Score	Result
2017	Rajiv Gandhi Indoor Stadium, Kochi, India	Mixed doubles 50+	(Indonesia) Alexander Tandun	(Republic of Ireland) Mark Topping (England) Debora Miller	19–21, 21–12, 21–14	Gold

=== Asian Games ===
Women's doubles
Year	Venue	Partner	Opponent	Score	Result
1986	Olympic Gymnastics Arena, Seoul, South Korea	(Indonesia) Imelda Wiguna	(South Korea) Kim Yun-ja (South Korea) Yoo Sang-hee	12–15, 13–15	Bronze

Mixed doubles
Year	Venue	Partner	Opponent	Score	Result
1990	Beijing Gymnasium, Beijing, China	(Indonesia) Rudy Gunawan	(South Korea) Park Joo-bong (South Korea) Chung Myung-hee	9–15, 4–15	Bronze

=== Asian Cup ===
Women's doubles
Year	Venue	Partner	Opponent	Score	Result
1991	Istora Senayan, Jakarta, Indonesia	(Indonesia) Erma Sulistianingsih	(South Korea) Chung So-young (South Korea) Hwang Hye-young	3–15, 15–5, 11–15	Bronze

=== SEA Games ===
Women's doubles
Year	Venue	Partner	Opponent	Score	Result
1983	Singapore Badminton Hall, Singapore	(Indonesia) Mary Harlim	(Indonesia) Ruth Damayanti (Indonesia) Maria Francisca	3–15, 9–15	Silver
1985	Chulalongkorn University Indoor Stadium, Bangkok, Thailand	(Indonesia) Imelda Wiguna	(Indonesia) Verawaty Fadjrin (Indonesia) Elizabeth Latief	15–2, 15–4	Gold
1987	Kuningan Hall, Jakarta, Indonesia	(Indonesia) Verawaty Fadjrin	(Indonesia) Yanti Kusmiati (Indonesia) Erma Sulistianingsih	17–14, 15–17, 15–10	Gold
1989	Stadium Negara, Kuala Lumpur, Malaysia	(Indonesia) Erma Sulistianingsih	(Indonesia) Verawaty Fadjrin (Indonesia) Yanti Kusmiati	15–6, 15–6	Gold
1991	Camp Crame Gymnasium, Manila, Philippines	(Indonesia) Erma Sulistianingsih	(Indonesia) Finarsih (Indonesia) Lili Tampi	15–10, 15–10	Gold

Mixed doubles
Year	Venue	Partner	Opponent	Score	Result
1985	Chulalongkorn University Indoor Stadium, Bangkok, Thailand	(Indonesia) Chafidz Yusuf	(Indonesia) Christian Hadinata (Indonesia) Imelda Wiguna	9–15, 5–15	Silver
1991	Camp Crame Gymnasium, Manila, Philippines	(Indonesia) Ricky Subagja	(Indonesia) Rexy Mainaky (Indonesia) Erma Sulistianingsih	15–6, 15–13	Gold

=== International tournaments (10 titles, 16 runners-up) ===
The World Badminton Grand Prix sanctioned by International Badminton Federation (IBF) from 1983 to 2006.

Women's doubles
Year	Tournament	Partner	Opponent	Score	Result
1983	Holland Masters	(Indonesia) Ivana Lie	(England) Gillian Gilks (England) Helen Troke	15–8, 15–12	(gold) Winner
1985	Thailand Open	(Indonesia) Imelda Wiguna	(China) Guan Weizhen (China) Wu Jianqiu	1–15, 2–15	(silver) Runner-up
1985	Indonesia Open	(Indonesia) Ivana Lie	(China) Han Aiping (China) Li Lingwei	7–15, 8–15	(silver) Runner-up
1986	Indonesia Open	(Indonesia) Imelda Wiguna	(Indonesia) Verawaty Fadjrin (Indonesia) Ivana Lie	15–17, 2–15	(silver) Runner-up
1987	Indonesia Open	(Indonesia) Ivana Lie	(Indonesia) Verawaty Fadjrin (Indonesia) Susi Susanti	15–4, 17–16	(gold) Winner
1987	Konica Cup	(Indonesia) Ivana Lie	(South Korea) Chung Myung-hee (South Korea) Hwang Hye-young	5–15, 4–15	(silver) Runner-up
1987	Hong Kong Open	(Indonesia) Ivana Lie	(South Korea) Chung So-young (South Korea) Kim Yun-ja	14–18, 15–11, 2–15	(silver) Runner-up
1989	German Open	(Indonesia) Erma Sulistianingsih	(England) Gillian Clark (England) Gillian Gowers	10–15, 15–2, 15–9	(gold) Winner
1989	Indonesia Open	(Indonesia) Erma Sulistianingsih	(Indonesia) Verawaty Fadjrin (Indonesia) Yanti Kusmiati	15–7, 15–9	(gold) Winner
1989	World Grand Prix Finals	(Indonesia) Erma Sulistianingsih	(Denmark) Dorte Kjær (Denmark) Nettie Nielsen	11–15, 18–16, 18–16	(gold) Winner
1990	Indonesia Open	(Indonesia) Erma Sulistianingsih	(South Korea) Chung Myung-hee (South Korea) Chung So-young	15–17, 15–8, 3–15	(silver) Runner-up
1990	World Grand Prix Finals	(Indonesia) Erma Sulistianingsih	(China) Lai Caiqin (China) Yao Fen	14–18, 10–15	(silver) Runner-up
1991	Chinese Taipei Open	(Indonesia) Erma Sulistianingsih	(Japan) Kimiko Jinnai (Japan) Hisako Mori	7–15, 17–18	(silver) Runner-up
1991	World Grand Prix Finals	(Indonesia) Erma Sulistianingsih	(South Korea) Chung So-young (South Korea) Hwang Hye-young	15–18, 3–15	(silver) Runner-up
1992	Indonesia Open	(Indonesia) Erma Sulistianingsih	(England) Gillian Clark (England) Gillian Gowers	15–12, 15–9	(gold) Winner
1992	Hong Kong Open	(Indonesia) Erma Sulistianingsih	(China) Nong Qunhua (China) Zhou Lei	8–15, 6–15	(silver) Runner-up
1992	Thailand Open	(Indonesia) Erma Sulistianingsih	(China) Nong Qunhua (China) Zhou Lei	4–15, 15–12, 8–15	(silver) Runner-up
1993	World Grand Prix Finals	(Indonesia) Eliza Nathanael	(Indonesia) Finarsih (Indonesia) Lili Tampi	11–15, 10–15	(silver) Runner-up

Mixed doubles
Year	Tournament	Partner	Opponent	Score	Result
1989	Dutch Open	(Indonesia) Rudy Gunawan	(Indonesia) Eddy Hartono (Indonesia) Verawaty Fadjrin	5–15, 5–15	(silver) Runner-up
1989	German Open	(Indonesia) Rudy Gunawan	(Denmark) Jan Paulsen (England) Gillian Gowers	16–18, 8–15	(silver) Runner-up
1989	Indonesia Open	(Indonesia) Rudy Gunawan	(Indonesia) Eddy Hartono (Indonesia) Verawaty Fadjrin	7–15, 2–15	(silver) Runner-up
1990	Indonesia Open	(Indonesia) Rudy Gunawan	(Indonesia) Aryono Miranat (Indonesia) Erma Sulistianingsih	15–5, 11–15, 15–4	(gold) Winner
1993	French Open	(Indonesia) Rudy Gunawan	(Indonesia) Aryono Miranat (Indonesia) Eliza Nathanael	7–15, 12–15	(silver) Runner-up
1993	Polish International	(Indonesia) Rudy Gunawan	(Indonesia) I. Paulus (Indonesia) S. Herawati	15–8, 15–3	(gold) Winner
1993	Indonesia Open	(Indonesia) Rudy Gunawan	(Indonesia) I. Paulus (Indonesia) S. Herawati	15–7, 15–3	(gold) Winner
1993	Hong Kong Open	(Indonesia) Rudy Gunawan	(Indonesia) Aryono Miranat (Indonesia) Rosalina Riseu	15–12, 15–6	(gold) Winner

IBF Grand Prix tournament
IBF Grand Prix Finals tournament
