= Thailand Open (badminton) =

Annual badminton tournament

- Official website
- Founded: 1984; 42 years ago
- Editions: 38 (2026)
- Location: Bangkok (2026); Thailand
- Venue: Nimibutr Stadium (2026)
- Prize money: USD500,000 (2026)

Men's
- Draw: 32S / 32D
- Current champions: Anders Antonsen (singles); Leo Rolly Carnando; Daniel Marthin (doubles)
- Most singles titles: 3 Joko Suprianto
- Most doubles titles: 3 Jung Jae-sung

Women's
- Draw: 32S / 32D
- Current champions: Akane Yamaguchi (singles); Bao Lijing; Cao Zihan (doubles)
- Most singles titles: 4 Susi Susanti
- Most doubles titles: 4 Greysia Polii

Mixed doubles
- Draw: 32
- Current champions: Mathias Christiansen; Alexandra Bøje
- Most titles (male): 3 Park Joo-bong
- Most titles (female): 2 Chung Myung-hee; Sapsiree Taerattanachai; Huang Dongping

Super 500
- Arctic Open; Australian Open; Hong Kong Open; Hylo Open; Indonesia Masters; Japan Masters; Korea Open; Malaysia Masters; Thailand Open

Last completed
- 2026 Thailand Open

The Thailand Open is an international badminton tournament held in Thailand since 1984. Since 2018, it has been classified as a Super 500 event on the BWF World Tour.

== Championship venues ==
Years active	Venue	Location
2007–2009, 2012–2013, 2016–2018, 2024–2026	Nimibutr Stadium	Bangkok
2011	Chulalongkorn University Sport Complex	Bangkok
2015	Thunder Dome	Muang Thong Thani
2019, 2023	Indoor Stadium Huamark	Bangkok
2020 I–2020 II, 2022	Impact, Muang Thong Thani	Muang Thong Thani

Locations of Thailand Open host cities

== Past winners ==
Year	Men's singles	Women's singles	Men's doubles	Women's doubles	Mixed doubles
1984	(Indonesia) Icuk Sugiarto	(England) Helen Troke	(Indonesia) Hadibowo (Indonesia) Christian Hadinata	(England) Karen Beckman (England) Gillian Gilks	No competition
1985	(Indonesia) Icuk Sugiarto	(China) Wu Jianqiu	(Indonesia) Bobby Ertanto (Indonesia) Rudy Heryanto	(China) Guan Weizhen (China) Wu Jianqiu	No competition
1986	No competition				
1987	(China) Zhao Jianhua	(China) Luo Yun	(China) Li Yongbo (China) Tian Bingyi	(China) Guan Weizhen (China) Lin Ying	(Denmark) Peter Buch (Denmark) Grete Mogensen
1988	(China) Xiong Guobao	(China) Li Lingwei	(China) Li Yongbo (China) Tian Bingyi	(South Korea) Chung Myung-hee (South Korea) Hwang Hye-young	(Denmark) Steen Fladberg (England) Gillian Clark
1989	(Indonesia) Alan Budikusuma	(China) Tang Jiuhong	(South Korea) Kim Moon-soo (South Korea) Park Joo-bong	(China) Guan Weizhen (China) Lin Ying	(South Korea) Park Joo-bong (South Korea) Chung Myung-hee
1990	(Thailand) Sompol Kukasemkij	(China) Huang Hua	(South Korea) Kim Moon-soo (South Korea) Park Joo-bong	(China) Lai Caiqin (China) Yao Fen	(South Korea) Park Joo-bong (South Korea) Chung Myung-hee
1991	(Indonesia) Alan Budikusuma	(Indonesia) Susi Susanti	(Indonesia) Rudy Gunawan (Indonesia) Eddy Hartono	(South Korea) Gil Young-ah (South Korea) Hwang Hye-young	(South Korea) Lee Sang-bok (South Korea) Chung So-young
1992	(Indonesia) Joko Suprianto	(Indonesia) Susi Susanti	(Indonesia) Rexy Mainaky (Indonesia) Ricky Subagja	(China) Nong Qunhua (China) Zhou Lei	(Indonesia) Aryono Miranat (Indonesia) Eliza Nathanael
1993	(Indonesia) Joko Suprianto	(Indonesia) Susi Susanti	(Indonesia) Rudy Gunawan (Indonesia) Bambang Suprianto	(China) Ge Fei (China) Gu Jun	(China) Liu Jianjun (China) Wang Xiaoyuan
1994	(Indonesia) Joko Suprianto	(Indonesia) Susi Susanti	(Indonesia) Antonius Ariantho (Indonesia) Denny Kantono	(China) Ge Fei (China) Gu Jun	(Indonesia) Tri Kusharjanto (Indonesia) Minarti Timur
1995	(China) Dong Jiong	(Sweden) Lim Xiaoqing	(China) Huang Zhanzhong (China) Jiang Xin	(South Korea) Gil Young-ah (South Korea) Jang Hye-ock	(South Korea) Park Joo-bong (South Korea) Ra Kyung-min
1996	(China) Dong Jiong	(China) Wang Chen	(Indonesia) Sigit Budiarto (Indonesia) Candra Wijaya	(Indonesia) Indarti Isolina (Indonesia) Deyana Lomban	(Indonesia) Tri Kusharjanto (Indonesia) Minarti Timur
1997	(Indonesia) Hendrawan	(China) Wang Chen	(South Korea) Lee Dong-soo (South Korea) Yoo Yong-sung	(China) Qin Yiyuan (China) Tang Yongshu	(Denmark) Michael Søgaard (Denmark) Rikke Olsen
1998	No competition				
1999	(China) Chen Gang	(China) Dai Yun	(China) Chen Qiqiu (China) Yu Jinhao	(China) Gao Ling (China) Qin Yiyuan	(China) Liu Yong (China) Ge Fei
2000	(Indonesia) Hendrawan	(China) Ye Zhaoying	(China) Zhang Jun (China) Zhang Wei	(China) Ge Fei (China) Gu Jun	(China) Zhang Jun (China) Gao Ling
2001	(Malaysia) Yong Hock Kin	(England) Tracey Hallam	(Indonesia) Sigit Budiarto (Indonesia) Luluk Hadiyanto	(Indonesia) Eny Erlangga (Indonesia) Jo Novita	(Indonesia) Candra Wijaya (Indonesia) Jo Novita
2002	No competition				
2003	(Singapore) Ronald Susilo	(China) Dai Yun	(South Korea) Ha Tae-kwon (South Korea) Yoo Yong-sung	(China) Wei Yili (China) Zhao Tingting	(China) Chen Qiqiu (China) Zhao Tingting
2004	(Thailand) Boonsak Ponsana	(Netherlands) Yao Jie	(Indonesia) Luluk Hadiyanto (Indonesia) Alvent Yulianto	(China) Zhang Dan (China) Zhang Yawen	(England) Nathan Robertson (England) Gail Emms
2005	(Malaysia) Muhammad Hafiz Hashim	(Netherlands) Yao Jie	(South Korea) Jung Jae-sung (South Korea) Lee Jae-jin	(South Korea) Lee Hyo-jung (South Korea) Lee Kyung-won	(South Korea) Lee Jae-jin (South Korea) Lee Hyo-jung
2006	(China) Chen Yu	(China) Zhu Lin	(South Korea) Jung Jae-sung (South Korea) Lee Yong-dae	(South Korea) Lee Hyo-jung (South Korea) Lee Kyung-won	(South Korea) Lee Yong-dae (South Korea) Hwang Yu-mi
2007	(China) Chen Hong	(China) Zhu Lin	(South Korea) Hwang Ji-man (South Korea) Lee Jae-jin	(China) Gao Ling (China) Huang Sui	(China) He Hanbin (China) Yu Yang
2008	(China) Lin Dan	(China) Xie Xingfang	(China) Cai Yun (China) Fu Haifeng	(China) Yang Wei (China) Zhang Jiewen	(China) Xie Zhongbo (China) Zhang Yawen
2009	(Vietnam) Nguyễn Tiến Minh	(China) Liu Jian	(Malaysia) Chan Peng Soon (Malaysia) Lim Khim Wah	(China) Yang Wei (China) Zhang Jiewen	(Thailand) Songphon Anugritayawon (Thailand) Kunchala Voravichitchaikul
2010	Cancelled				
2011	(China) Chen Long	(China) Li Xuerui	(South Korea) Jung Jae-sung (South Korea) Lee Yong-dae	(China) Tian Qing (China) Zhao Yunlei	(Chinese Taipei) Lee Sheng-mu (Chinese Taipei) Chien Yu-chin
2012	(Indonesia) Sony Dwi Kuncoro	(India) Saina Nehwal	(China) Liu Xiaolong (China) Qiu Zihan	(Thailand) Narissapat Lam (Thailand) Saralee Thungthongkam	(China) Tao Jiaming (China) Tang Jinhua
2013	(India) Srikanth Kidambi	(Thailand) Ratchanok Intanon	(South Korea) Shin Baek-cheol (South Korea) Yoo Yeon-seong	(Indonesia) Nitya Krishinda Maheswari (Indonesia) Greysia Polii	(Indonesia) Markis Kido (Indonesia) Pia Zebadiah Bernadet
2014	Cancelled				
2015	(South Korea) Lee Hyun-il	(South Korea) Sung Ji-hyun	(Indonesia) Wahyu Nayaka (Indonesia) Ade Yusuf	(China) Huang Dongping (China) Li Yinhui	(South Korea) Choi Sol-gyu (South Korea) Eom Hye-won
2016	(Thailand) Tanongsak Saensomboonsuk	(Japan) Aya Ohori	(Indonesia) Berry Angriawan (Indonesia) Rian Agung Saputro	(Thailand) Puttita Supajirakul (Thailand) Sapsiree Taerattanachai	(Malaysia) Tan Kian Meng (Malaysia) Lai Pei Jing
2017	(India) B. Sai Praneeth	(Thailand) Ratchanok Intanon	(Indonesia) Berry Angriawan (Indonesia) Hardianto	(Indonesia) Greysia Polii (Indonesia) Apriyani Rahayu	(China) He Jiting (China) Du Yue
2018	(Japan) Kanta Tsuneyama	(Japan) Nozomi Okuhara	(Japan) Takeshi Kamura (Japan) Keigo Sonoda	(Indonesia) Greysia Polii (Indonesia) Apriyani Rahayu	(Indonesia) Hafiz Faizal (Indonesia) Gloria Emanuelle Widjaja
2019	(Chinese Taipei) Chou Tien-chen	(China) Chen Yufei	(India) Satwiksairaj Rankireddy (India) Chirag Shetty	(Japan) Shiho Tanaka (Japan) Koharu Yonemoto	(China) Wang Yilyu (China) Huang Dongping
2020 I	(Denmark) Viktor Axelsen	(Spain) Carolina Marín	(Chinese Taipei) Lee Yang (Chinese Taipei) Wang Chi-lin	(Indonesia) Greysia Polii (Indonesia) Apriyani Rahayu	(Thailand) Dechapol Puavaranukroh (Thailand) Sapsiree Taerattanachai
2020 II	(Denmark) Viktor Axelsen	(Spain) Carolina Marín	(Chinese Taipei) Lee Yang (Chinese Taipei) Wang Chi-lin	(South Korea) Kim So-yeong (South Korea) Kong Hee-yong	(Thailand) Dechapol Puavaranukroh (Thailand) Sapsiree Taerattanachai
2021	cancelled (Note: This tournament, originally to be played from 15–20 June, was later cancelled due to COVID-19 pandemic in Thailand.)				
2022	(Malaysia) Lee Zii Jia	(Chinese Taipei) Tai Tzu-ying	(Japan) Takuro Hoki (Japan) Yugo Kobayashi	(Japan) Nami Matsuyama (Japan) Chiharu Shida	(China) Zheng Siwei (China) Huang Yaqiong
2023	(Thailand) Kunlavut Vitidsarn	(South Korea) An Se-young	(China) Liang Weikeng (China) Wang Chang	(South Korea) Kim So-yeong (South Korea) Kong Hee-yong	(South Korea) Kim Won-ho (South Korea) Jeong Na-eun
2024	(Malaysia) Lee Zii Jia	(Thailand) Supanida Katethong	(India) Satwiksairaj Rankireddy (India) Chirag Shetty	(Thailand) Jongkolphan Kititharakul (Thailand) Rawinda Prajongjai	(China) Guo Xinwa (China) Chen Fanghui
2025	(Thailand) Kunlavut Vitidsarn	(China) Chen Yufei	(Malaysia) Aaron Chia (Malaysia) Soh Wooi Yik	(Malaysia) Pearly Tan (Malaysia) Thinaah Muralitharan	(China) Feng Yanzhe (China) Huang Dongping
2026	(Denmark) Anders Antonsen	(Japan) Akane Yamaguchi	(Indonesia) Leo Rolly Carnando (Indonesia) Daniel Marthin	(China) Bao Lijing (China) Cao Zihan	(Denmark) Mathias Christiansen (Denmark) Alexandra Bøje

== Performances by nation ==
As of the 2026 edition

Nations by ranking
Pos	Nation	MS	WS	MD	WD	XD	Total
1	China	9	17	8	18	12	64
2	Indonesia	10	4	13	6	6	39
3	South Korea	1	2	9	7	8	27
4	Thailand	5	3		3	3	14
5	Japan	1	3	2	2		8
5	Malaysia	4		2	1	1	8
7	Denmark	3				3.5	6.5
8	Chinese Taipei	1	1	2		1	5
8	India	2	1	2			5
10	England		2		1	1.5	4.5
11	Netherlands		2				2
11	Spain		2				2
13	Singapore	1					1
13	Sweden		1				1
13	Vietnam	1					1
	Total	38	38	38	38	36	188
