= Pavelló de la Mar Bella =

Sports arena in Barcelona, Catalonia

Coordinates: 41°24′00″N 2°12′42.79″E

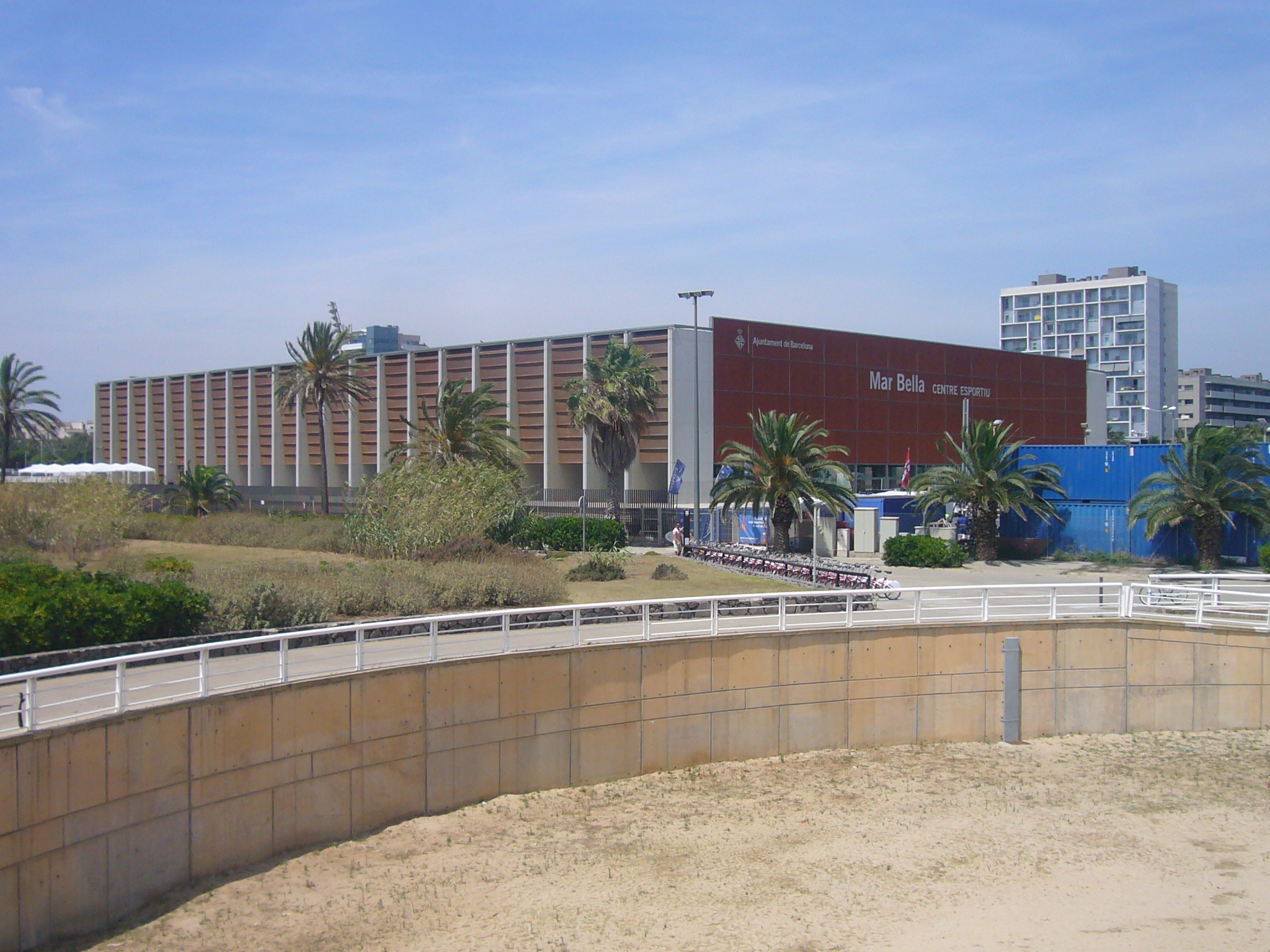
Pavelló de la Mar Bella

The Pavelló de la Mar Bella is an indoor arena located in Barcelona, Catalonia. Seating 4000, it hosted the badminton events for 1992 Summer Olympics.

This venue was completed in time for the 1992 Games.

In 1993, it was converted to a privately owned municipal multi-purpose venue, granted to Club Natació Poble Nou. Due to the financial issues faced by said entity, the City Hall of Barcelona recovered the grant and bestowed to the municipal company B:SM. In 2011, the Barcelona School Sports Board (Consell de l'Esport Escolar de Barcelona, CEEB) obtained the grant.
