= Hisako Mori =

Japanese badminton player

Personal information
- Born: 4 May 1964 (age 62) Kanagawa Prefecture, Japan

Sport
- Country: Japan
- Sport: Badminton
- BWF profile
Medal record
Women's badminton
Representing Japan
Asian Games
Bronze medal – third place	1990 Beijing	Women's team
Asian Cup
Silver medal – second place	1991 Jakarta	Women's doubles

Hisako Mori (森 久子, Mori Hisako; born 4 May 1964) is a Japanese badminton player, born in Kanagawa Prefecture. She competed in women's doubles with teammate Kimiko Jinnai at the 1992 Summer Olympics in Barcelona.

== Achievements ==
=== Asian Cup ===
Women's doubles

Year	Venue	Partner	Opponent	Score	Result
1991	Istora Senayan, Jakarta, Indonesia	(Japan) Kimiko Jinnai	(South Korea) Chung So-young (South Korea) Hwang Hye-young	13-15, 1-15	Silver

=== IBF World Grand Prix (1 title, 3 runners-up) ===
The World Badminton Grand Prix was sanctioned by the International Badminton Federation from 1983 to 2006.

Women's doubles

Year	Tournament	Partner	Opponent	Score	Result
1990	Japan Open	(Japan) Kimiko Jinnai	(China) Lai Caiqin (China) Yao Fen	15–7, 9–15, 10–15	(silver) Runner-up
1991	Chinese Taipei Open	(Japan) Kimiko Jinnai	(Indonesia) Erma Sulistianingsih (Indonesia) Rosiana Tendean	15–7, 18–17	(gold) Winner
1991	All England Open	(Japan) Kimiko Jinnai	(South Korea) Chung So-young (South Korea) Hwang Hye-young	5–15, 3–15	(silver) Runner-up
1992	U.S. Open	(Japan) Kimiko Jinnai	(Sweden) Lim Xiaoqing (Sweden) Christine Gandrup	4–15, 9–15	(silver) Runner-up

=== IBF International (1 runner-up) ===
Women’s singles

Year	Tournament	Opponent	Score	Result
1986	U.S. Open	(Canada) Denyse Julien	10–12, 11–3, 9–12	(silver) Runner-up
