= Yang Xinfang =

Chinese badminton player

Yang Xinfang 杨新芳
Personal information
- Born: Guangdong, China

Sport
- Country: China
- Sport: Badminton
- Handedness: Right
- BWF profile
Medal record
Women's badminton
Representing China
World Championships
Bronze medal – third place	1987 Beijing	Mixed doubles
Bronze medal – third place	1989 Jakarta	Mixed doubles

Yang Xinfang (Chinese: 杨新芳; pinyin: Yáng Xīnfāng; Mandarin pronunciation: jáŋ ɕīnfāŋ) is a former badminton player from China.

Xinfang is a national coach and head coach of Guangzhou Badminton Team. Her journey of playing career originated from Elementary School. She was encouraged by her physical education teacher and with that gradually fell in love with the sport of badminton. Her major achievement at the international stage were the two bronze medals in World championships, after which she joined the coaching career.

== Achievements ==
=== World Championships ===
Mixed doubles
Year	Venue	Partner	Opponent	Score	Result
1987	Capital Indoor Stadium, Beijing, China	(China) He Yiming	(South Korea) Lee Deuk-choon (South Korea) Chung Myung-hee	6–15, 15–11, 10–15	Bronze
1989	Istora Gelora Bung Karno, Jakarta, Indonesia	(China) Wu Chibing	(South Korea) Park Joo-bong (South Korea) Chung Myung-hee	2–15, 11–15	Bronze

=== IBF World Grand Prix ===
The World Badminton Grand Prix sanctioned by International Badminton Federation (IBF) from 1983 to 2006.

Mixed doubles
Year	Tournament	Partner	Opponent	Score	Result
1988	U.S. Open	(China) Lee Xiong	(Indonesia) Christian Hadinata (Indonesia) Ivana Lie	15–9, 0–15, 14–15	(silver) Runner-up

=== International tournaments ===
Women's singles
Year	Tournament	Opponent	Score	Result
1983	Victor Cup	(China) Luo Yun	2–11, 7–11	(silver) Runner-up
