= 1989 IBF World Championships – Mixed doubles =

Mixed doubles at the 1989 IBF World Championships
- Venue: Istora Senayan
- Location: Jakarta, Indonesia
- Dates: 29 May – 4 June

Medalists
gold medal	Park Joo-bong; Chung Myung-hee	South Korea
silver medal	Eddy Hartono; Verawaty Fadjrin	Indonesia
bronze medal	Wu Chibing; Yang Xinfang	China
bronze medal	Wang Pengren; Shi Fangjing	China

The 1989 IBF World Championships were held in Jakarta, Indonesia, in 1989. Following are the results of the mixed doubles.

== Main stage ==
=== Section 1 ===
First round
(South Korea) Park Joo-bong (South Korea) Chung Myung-hee	15	15
(Germany) Ralf Rausch (Germany) Nicole Baldewein	3	0
(Indonesia) Ricky Subagja (Indonesia) Erma Sulistianingsih	15	15
(Japan) Eishi Kibune (Japan) Hisako Mori	4	5
(Denmark) Jan Paulsen (Denmark) Lotte Olsen	15	15
(Hong Kong) Chan Siu Kwong (Hong Kong) Chiu Mei Yin	5	8
(Canada) Mike Bitten (Canada) Doris Piché	15	15
(France) Franck Panel (France) Sandra Dimbour	4	7
(China) Jiang Guoliang (China) Nong Qunhua
(Soviet Union) Sergey Sevryukov (Soviet Union) Irina Serova
(Scotland) Kenny Middlemiss (Scotland) Elinor Middlemiss	9	1
(New Zealand) Philip Horne (New Zealand) Katrin Te Tai	15	15
(Mauritius) Jean-Michel Duverge (Mauritius) Martine de Souza	0	4
(Indonesia) Richard Mainaky (Indonesia) Yanti Kusmiati	15	15
(England) Anders Nielsen (England) Fiona Smith	15	15
(Poland) Grzegorz Olchowik (Poland) Marzena Masiuk	10	4

Second round
(South Korea) Park Joo-bong (South Korea) Chung Myung-hee	15	15
(Indonesia) Ricky Subagja (Indonesia) Erma Sulistianingsih	9	6
(Denmark) Jan Paulsen (Denmark) Lotte Olsen	10	14
(Canada) Mike Bitten (Canada) Doris Piché	15	17
(China) Jiang Guoliang (China) Nong Qunhua	15	15
(New Zealand) Philip Horne (New Zealand) Katrin Te Tai	3	6
(Indonesia) Richard Mainaky (Indonesia) Yanti Kusmiati	15	15
(England) Anders Nielsen (England) Fiona Smith	2	4

Third round
(South Korea) Park Joo-bong (South Korea) Chung Myung-hee	'15	'15
(Canada) Mike Bitten (Canada) Doris Piché	3	1
(China) Jiang Guoliang (China) Nong Qunhua	17	2	14
(Indonesia) Richard Mainaky (Indonesia) Yanti Kusmiati	15	15	17

Quarterfinals
(South Korea) Park Joo-bong (South Korea) Chung Myung-hee	15	15
(Indonesia) Richard Mainaky (Indonesia) Yanti Kusmiati	3	8

=== Section 2 ===
First round
(China) Wu Chibing (China) Yang Xinfang	12	15	15
(Sweden) Jan-Eric Antonsson (Sweden) Maria Bengtsson	15	8	7
(Iceland) Broddi Kristjánsson (Iceland) Þórdís Edwald	15	15
(United States) Karl Knudsen (United States) Erika von Heiland	12	7
(South Korea) Kim Moon-soo (South Korea) Gil Young-ah	15	15
(New Zealand) Kevin Ross (New Zealand) Jane Clarke	5	4
(Indonesia) Bobby Ertanto (Indonesia) Lilik Sudarwati	10	15	18
(Germany) Guido Schänzler (Germany) Katrin Schmidt	15	9	14
(Denmark) Jesper Knudsen (Denmark) Nettie Nielsen	15	15
(Netherlands) Rob Stalenhoef (Netherlands) Monique Hoogland	8	8
(Australia) Gordon Lang (Australia) Rhonda Cator	15	13	8
(Soviet Union) Vitaliy Shmakov (Soviet Union) Vlada Tcherniavskaia	4	18	15
(Thailand) Mongkol Kamlaithong (Thailand) Piyathip Sansaniyakulvilai	7	10
(England) Martin Dew (England) Gillian Clark	15	15
(Japan) Shinji Matsuura (Japan) Kimiko Jinnai	15	15
(South Korea) Lee Jung-mi (South Korea) Ahn Jae-chang	11	4

Second round
(China) Wu Chibing (China) Yang Xinfang	15	15
(Iceland) Broddi Kristjánsson (Iceland) Þórdís Edwald	5	4
(South Korea) Kim Moon-soo (South Korea) Gil Young-ah	15	15
(Indonesia) Bobby Ertanto (Indonesia) Lilik Sudarwati	12	10
(Denmark) Jesper Knudsen (Denmark) Nettie Nielsen	15	5	15
(Soviet Union) Vitaliy Shmakov (Soviet Union) Vlada Tcherniavskaia	11	15	9
(England) Martin Dew (England) Gillian Clark	17	15
(Japan) Shinji Matsuura (Japan) Kimiko Jinnai	14	6

Third round
(China) Wu Chibing (China) Yang Xinfang	'18	'15
(South Korea) Kim Moon-soo (South Korea) Gil Young-ah	14	10
(Denmark) Jesper Knudsen (Denmark) Nettie Nielsen	15	18
(England) Martin Dew (England) Gillian Clark	3

Quarterfinals
(China) Wu Chibing (China) Yang Xinfang	7	15	15
(Denmark) Jesper Knudsen (Denmark) Nettie Nielsen	15	10	12

=== Section 3 ===
First round
(South Korea) Shon Jin-hwan (South Korea) Chun Sung-suk	15	15
(Japan) Yasumasa Tsujita (Japan) Yoko Koizumi	8	3
(Hong Kong) Chan Chi Choi (Hong Kong) Amy Chan	15	15
(Germany) Volker Eiber (Germany) Kirsten Schmieder	2	3
(Indonesia) Joko Mardianto (Indonesia) Dwi Elmyati	15	15
(Canada) Mike Butler (Canada) Johanne Falardeau	1	9
(Denmark) Henrik Svarrer (Denmark) Dorte Kjær	15	15
(Switzerland) Hubert Müller (Switzerland) Liselotte Blumer	1	4
(South Korea) Kim Hak-kyun (South Korea) Kim Ho-ja	15	15
(Scotland) Kevin Scott (Bulgaria) Diana Koleva	2	5
(France) Christophe Jeanjean (France) Rosita Rios	1	7
(Soviet Union) Andrey Antropov (Soviet Union) Elena Rybkina	15	15
(Myanmar) Marlar Myint (Myanmar) Tun Htein Win	4	6
(Japan) Takako Shinki (Japan) Hiroki Eto	15	15
(Indonesia) Eddy Hartono (Indonesia) Verawaty Fadjrin
(India) Deepti Thanekar (India) Sushant Bora

Second round
(South Korea) Shon Jin-hwan (South Korea) Chun Sung-suk	9	17	3
(Hong Kong) Chan Chi Choi (Hong Kong) Amy Chan	15	14	15
(Indonesia) Joko Mardianto (Indonesia) Dwi Elmyati	6	3
(Denmark) Henrik Svarrer (Denmark) Dorte Kjær	15	15
(South Korea) Kim Hak-kyun (South Korea) Kim Ho-ja	8	2
(Soviet Union) Andrey Antropov (Soviet Union) Elena Rybkina	15	15
(Japan) Takako Shinki (Japan) Hiroki Eto	2	3
(Indonesia) Eddy Hartono (Indonesia) Verawaty Fadjrin	15	15

Third round
(Hong Kong) Chan Chi Choi (Hong Kong) Amy Chan	2	7
(Denmark) Henrik Svarrer (Denmark) Dorte Kjær	15	15
(Soviet Union) Andrey Antropov (Soviet Union) Elena Rybkina
(Indonesia) Eddy Hartono (Indonesia) Verawaty Fadjrin

Quarterfinals
(Denmark) Henrik Svarrer (Denmark) Dorte Kjær	4	5
(Indonesia) Eddy Hartono (Indonesia) Verawaty Fadjrin	15	15

=== Section 4 ===
First round
(New Zealand) Graeme Robson (New Zealand) Toni Whittaker	15	15
(Sri Lanka) Duminda Jayakody (Sri Lanka) Sriyani Deepika	5	1
(South Korea) Sung Han-kook (South Korea) Chung So-young	15	15
(Austria) Klaus Fischer (Austria) Sabine Aberer	1	2
(Indonesia) Aryono Miranat (Indonesia) Minarti Timur	15	15
(Finland) Robert Liljequist (Finland) Kristiina Danskanen	8	3
(England) Andy Goode (England) Gillian Gowers	15	15
(Sweden) Jens Olsson (Sweden) Catrine Bengtsson	8	8
(Canada) Bryan Blanshard (Canada) Denyse Julien	15	15
(Thailand) Penpanor Klangthamnium (Thailand) Siripong Siripool	7	6
(Scotland) Dan Travers (Scotland) Jennifer Williamson	8	17	17
(Netherlands) Alex Meijer (Netherlands) Erica van den Heuvel	15	14	18
(Australia) Paul Stevenson (Australia) Lisa Campbell	8	15	3
(Germany) Markus Keck (Germany) Kerstin Ubben	15	9	15
(China) Shi Fangjing (China) Wang Pengren
(Nepal) Prakash Doj Rana (Nepal) Subha Shrestha

Second round
(New Zealand) Graeme Robson (New Zealand) Toni Whittaker	9	4
(South Korea) Sung Han-kook (South Korea) Chung So-young	15	15
(Indonesia) Aryono Miranat (Indonesia) Minarti Timur	15	15
(England) Andy Goode (England) Gillian Gowers	8	7
(Canada) Bryan Blanshard (Canada) Denyse Julien	14	4
(Netherlands) Alex Meijer (Netherlands) Erica van den Heuvel	17	15
(Germany) Markus Keck (Germany) Kerstin Ubben	8	7
(China) Shi Fangjing (China) Wang Pengren	15	15

Third round
(South Korea) Sung Han-kook (South Korea) Chung So-young	15	1	15
(Indonesia) Aryono Miranat (Indonesia) Minarti Timur	9	15	5
(Netherlands) Alex Meijer (Netherlands) Erica van den Heuvel	9	12
(China) Shi Fangjing (China) Wang Pengren	15	15

Quarterfinals
(South Korea) Sung Han-kook (South Korea) Chung So-young	10	8
(China) Shi Fangjing (China) Wang Pengren	15	15

== Final stage ==
Quarterfinals
1	(South Korea) Park Joo-bong (South Korea) Chung Myung-hee	15	15
8	(Indonesia) Richard Mainaky (Indonesia) Yanti Kusmiati	3	8
4	(China) Wu Chibing (China) Yang Xinfang	7	15	15
5	(Denmark) Jesper Knudsen (Denmark) Nettie Nielsen	15	10	12
3	(Denmark) Henrik Svarrer (Denmark) Dorte Kjær	4	5
6	(Indonesia) Eddy Hartono (Indonesia) Verawaty Fadjrin	15	15
2	(South Korea) Sung Han-kook (South Korea) Chung So-young	10	8
7	(China) Shi Fangjing (China) Wang Pengren	15	15

Semifinals
(South Korea) Park Joo-bong (South Korea) Chung Myung-hee	15	15
(China) Wu Chibing (China) Yang Xinfang	2	11
(Indonesia) Eddy Hartono (Indonesia) Verawaty Fadjrin	15	9	15
(China) Shi Fangjing (China) Wang Pengren	6	15	4

Finals
(South Korea) Park Joo-bong (South Korea) Chung Myung-hee	15	15
(Indonesia) Eddy Hartono (Indonesia) Verawaty Fadjrin	9	9
