= Wu Chibing =

Chinese badminton player (born 1964)

Chibing Wu 吴赤兵
Personal information
- Born: 1964 (age 61–62) Sichuan, China

Sport
- Country: United States
- Sport: Badminton
- Handedness: Left
- BWF profile
Medal record
Men's badminton
Representing China
World Championships
Bronze medal – third place	1989 Jakarta	Mixed doubles

Wu Chibing (Chinese: 吴赤兵; pinyin: Wú Chìbīng; Mandarin pronunciation: úːʈʂʰʐ̩̀ːpʲə̄ŋ) is a former badminton player from China who later represented United States in his career.

A former member of the Chinese National Badminton Team between 1987 and 1992, Wu hails from Sichuan province in China. He started his coaching career in 1992, where, he coached the Spanish National Olympic Team from 1994 to 1996 and the US National Olympic Team in 1997. He also founded New York City Badminton Club in New York in 1996 and served as the head coach for over 30 years. His major achievement was the bronze medal he won in 1989 World championships with then partner Yang Xinfang.

Wu now resides in New York, NY with his wife, two sons, and daughter.

== Achievements ==
=== World Championships ===
Mixed doubles
Year	Venue	Partner	Opponent	Score	Result
1989	Istora Gelora Bung Karno, Jakarta, Indonesia	(China) Yang Xinfang	(South Korea) Park Joo-bong (South Korea) Chung Myung-hee	2–15, 11–15	Bronze

=== IBF International ===
Men's doubles
Year	Tournament	Partner	Opponent	Score	Result
1997	U.S. OCBC International	(United States) Kevin Han	(United States) Benny Lee (United States) Ignatius Rusli	17–14, 15–7	(gold) Winner

Mixed doubles
Year	Tournament	Partner	Opponent	Score	Result
1989	Bulgarian International	(China) Lin Yanfen	(Poland) Jerzy Dołhan (Poland) Bożena Haracz	17–14, 15–11	(gold) Winner
1997	U.S. OCBC International	(United States) Cindy Shi	(United States) Andy Chong (United States) Yeping Tang	15–11, 15–10	(gold) Winner
