= Wang Pengren =

Chinese badminton player (born 1965)

Wang Pengren 王朋仁
Personal information
- Born: 1965 (age 60–61) Shanghai, China
- Height: 1.80 m (5 ft 11 in)

Sport
- Country: China
- Sport: Badminton
- Handedness: Right
Medal record
Men's Badminton
Representing China
World Championships
Gold medal – first place	1987 Beijing	Mixed doubles
Bronze medal – third place	1989 Jakarta	Mixed doubles
World Cup
Gold medal – first place	1987 Kuala Lumpur	Mixed doubles
Gold medal – first place	1988 Bangkok	Mixed doubles
Sudirman Cup
Bronze medal – third place	1989 Jakarta	Mixed team

Wang Pengren (Chinese: 王朋仁) is a male former world level badminton player from China.

== Career ==
He specialized in mixed doubles, winning almost all of his significant international titles partnership with Shi Fangjing. Though they had previously won together at the Polish Open in 1985, Wang and Shi were unexpected mixed doubles victors at the 1987 World Championships in Beijing. Proving this achievement to be no fluke, they subsequently captured a number of top-tier events, including the Badminton World Cup (1987, 1988), the Swedish Open (1988), the All-England Championships (1988), the World Badminton Grand Prix (1988), and the French Open (1989). In defense of their world title they were bronze medalists (semifinalists) at the 1989 edition of the IBF World Championships. After this, both soon disappeared from the world circuit. He is now a coach in Shanghai and one of his famous disciple is 2011 BWF World Championships Women's singles champion, Wang Yihan.

== Achievements ==
=== Olympic Games ===
Mixed doubles
Year	Venue	Partner	Opponent	Score	Result
1988 (exhibition)	Seoul National University Gymnasium; Seoul, South Korea	(China) Shi Fangjing	(South Korea) Park Joo-bong (South Korea) Chung Myung-hee	3–15, 7–15	Silver

=== World Championships ===
Mixed doubles
Year	Venue	Partner	Opponent	Score	Result
1987	Capital Indoor Stadium, Beijing, China	(China) Shi Fangjing	(South Korea) Lee Deuk-choon (South Korea) Chung Myung-hee	15–2, 8–15, 15–9	Gold
1989	Istora Senayan, Jakarta, Indonesia	(China) Shi Fangjing	(Indonesia) Eddy Hartono (Indonesia) Verawaty Fadjrin	6–15, 15–9, 4–15	Bronze

=== World Cup ===
Mixed doubles
Year	Venue	Partner	Opponent	Score	Result
1987	Stadium Negara, Kuala Lumpur, Malaysia	(China) Shi Fangjing	(Denmark) Steen Fladberg (England) Gillian Clark	15–11, 1–15, 15–4	Gold
1988	National Stadium, Bangkok, Thailand	(China) Shi Fangjing	(South Korea) Park Joo-bong (South Korea) Chung Myung-hee	15–17, 18–13, 15–8	Gold

=== IBF World Grand Prix ===
The World Badminton Grand Prix sanctioned by International Badminton Federation (IBF) since from 1983 to 2006.

Mixed doubles
Year	Tournament	Partner	Opponent	Score	Result
1988	Swedish Open	(China) Shi Fangjing	(Denmark) Jon Holst-Christensen (Denmark) Helle Andersen	15–9, 15–6	(gold) Winner
1988	All England Open	(China) Shi Fangjing	(Denmark) Jesper Knudsen (Denmark) Nettie Nielsen	15–2, 18–13	(gold) Winner
1988	Thailand Open	(China) Shi Fangjing	(Denmark) Steen Fladberg (England) Gillian Clark	14–17, 15–4, 9–15	(silver) Runner-Up
1988	China Open	(China) Shi Fangjing	(South Korea) Park Joo-bong (South Korea) Chung Myung-hee	6–15, 5–15	(silver) Runner-Up
1988	Malaysia Open	(China) Shi Fangjing	(Indonesia) Eddy Hartono (Indonesia) Verawaty Fadjrin	9–15, 7–15	(silver) Runner-Up
1988	World Grand Prix Finals	(China) Shi Fangjing	(England) Andy Goode (England) Gillian Gowers	15–6, 15–6	(gold) Winner
1989	Swedish Open	(China) Shi Fangjing	(South Korea) Park Joo-bong (South Korea) Chung Myung-hee	9–15, 4–15	(silver) Runner-Up
1989	French Open	(China) Shi Fangjing	(China) Jiang Guoliang (China) Nong Qunhua	12–15, 15–5, 15–11	(gold) Winner

=== IBF International ===
Men's doubles
Year	Tournament	Partner	Opponent	Score	Result
1985	Polish International	(China) Shu Yiong	(Denmark) Jan Paulsen (Denmark) Lars Petersen	12–15, 15–11, 15–7	(gold) Winner
1986	Polish International	(China) Zhang Qingwu	(China) Huang Zhen (China) Chen Hongyong	6–15, 9–15	(silver) Runner-up

Mixed doubles
Year	Tournament	Partner	Opponent	Score	Result
1984	U.S Open	(China) Luo Yun	(China) Xiong Guobao (China) Yin Haichen	15–10, 17–15	(gold) Winner
1985	Polish International	(China) Shi Fangjing	(China) Shu Yiong (China) Sun Xiaoqing	15–7, 15–6	(gold) Winner
1986	Polish International	(China) Shi Fangjing	(Poland) Jerzy Dołhan (Poland) Bożena Haracz	15–8, 15–3	(gold) Winner
