= 1987 IBF World Championships – Men's singles =

Badminton championships

Men's singles at the 1987 IBF World Championships
- Venue: Capital Indoor Stadium
- Location: Beijing, China
- Dates: May 18, 1987 – May 24, 1987

Medalists
gold medal	Yang Yang	China
silver medal	Morten Frost	Denmark
bronze medal	Zhao Jianhua	China
bronze medal	Icuk Sugiarto	Indonesia

The 1987 IBF World Championships (World Badminton Championships) were held in Beijing, China, in 1987. Following the results of the men's singles.

== Main stage ==
=== Section 1 ===
First round
(Denmark) Morten Frost	15	15
(Japan) Shokichi Miyamori	5	0
(Indonesia) Serian Wiyatno	15	15
(Hong Kong) Lai Hung	4	2
(Sweden) Jonas Herrgardh	15	15
(Austria) Klaus Fischer	6	3
(China) Li Mao	15	15
(New Zealand) Graeme Robson	1	1
(Malaysia) Rashid Sidek	15	15
(India) Syed Modi	9	6
(Soviet Union) Andrey Antropov	15	8	15
(Austria) Tariq Farooq	8	15	10
(Thailand) Sompol Kukasemkij
(Indonesia) Eddy Kurniawan	15	15
(South Korea) Chung Byung Yun	10	8

Second round
(Denmark) Morten Frost	15	15
(Indonesia) Serian Wiyatno	2	4
(Sweden) Jonas Herrgardh	9	0
(China) Li Mao	15	15
(Malaysia) Rashid Sidek	15	15
(Soviet Union) Andrey Antropov	3	8
(Thailand) Sompol Kukasemkij	15	8	5
(Indonesia) Eddy Kurniawan	7	15	15

Third round
(Denmark) Morten Frost	15	15
(China) Li Mao	6	8
(Malaysia) Rashid Sidek	5	15	15
(Indonesia) Eddy Kurniawan	15	7	10

Quarterfinals
(Denmark) Morten Frost	15	15
(Malaysia) Rashid Sidek	7	5

=== Section 2 ===
First round
(China) Zhao Jianhua	15	15
(Indonesia) Hermawan Susanto	3	3
(Singapore) Hamid Khan	15	15
(Canada) Peter Rawlek	10	8
(Sweden) Jan-Eric Antonsson	15	15
(Iceland) Tom Haengtsson	4	8
(Japan) Shuuji Matsuno	17	17
(Malaysia) Tan Kim Soon	14	14
(China) Zhang Qingwu	13	15	15
(South Korea) Park Sung-bae	18	7	4
(England) Darren Hall	15	15
(Scotland) Anthony Gallagher	12	6
(Japan) Hiroki Eto	15	15
(Austria) Gustav Adolphson	7	6
(Denmark) Jens-Peter Nierhoff

Second round
(China) Zhao Jianhua	15	15
(Singapore) Hamid Khan	5	11
(Sweden) Jan-Eric Antonsson	17	15
(Japan) Shuuji Matsuno	15	6
(China) Zhang Qingwu	16	15	15
(England) Darren Hall	18	8	11
(Japan) Hiroki Eto	12	4
(Denmark) Jens-Peter Nierhoff	15	15

Third round
(China) Zhao Jianhua	15	15
(Sweden) Jan-Eric Antonsson	2	4
(China) Zhang Qingwu	7	15	15
(Denmark) Jens-Peter Nierhoff	15	1	7

Quarterfinals
(China) Zhao Jianhua	15	15
(China) Zhang Qingwu	4	2

=== Section 3 ===
First round
(Denmark) Ib Frederiksen	15	15
(South Korea) Kun O-Suk	4	3
(Malaysia) Misbun Sidek	15	15
(Singapore) Lau Wing Cheok	12	6
(China) Xu Biao	15	15
(Hong Kong) Yeung Yik-Kei	7	2
(Netherlands) Pierre Pelupessy	15	15
(Hong Kong) Chan Chi-Choi	8	11
(China) Yang Yang	15	15
(Japan) Shinji Matsuura	3	2
(Indonesia) Allan Budikusuma	15	15
(Malaysia) Kwan Yoke Meng	3	12
(England) Nick Yates	15	15
(South Korea) Sang Yong Bae	10	5
(Sweden) Pär-Gunnar Jönsson	15	15
(Austria) Heinz Fischer	6	12

Second round
(Denmark) Ib Frederiksen	15	13	15
(Malaysia) Misbun Sidek	6	15	10
(China) Xu Biao	18	15
(Netherlands) Pierre Pelupessy	17	5
(China) Yang Yang	15	13	15
(Indonesia) Allan Budikusuma	11	15	3
(England) Nick Yates	15	15
(Sweden) Pär-Gunnar Jönsson	5	3

Third round
(Denmark) Ib Frederiksen	12	15	15
(China) Xu Biao	15	11	2
(China) Yang Yang	15	15
(England) Nick Yates	6	9

Quarterfinals
(Denmark) Ib Frederiksen	3	15	9
(China) Yang Yang	15	11	15

=== Section 4 ===
First round
(China) Xiong Guobao	15	15
(Denmark) Poul Erik Hoyer	11	10
(Scotland) Alex White	15	15
(United States) Tony Alston	5	8
(Hong Kong) Sze Yu	15	15
(United States) Chris Jogis	10	6
(Indonesia) Eddy Ismanto	15	15
(India) Prakash Padukone	8	11
(Indonesia) Icuk Sugiarto	15	15
(Sweden) Ulf Johansson	8	6
(Germany) Volker Eiber	3	15	10
(Canada) Ian Johnson	15	11	15
(South Korea) Sung Han-kuk	15	15
(Japan) Hiroshi Nishiyama	4	2
(Malaysia) Chong Weng Kai	15	15
(Canada) Mike Butler	11	7

Second round
(China) Xiong Guobao	15	18
(Scotland) Alex White	5	13
(Hong Kong) Sze Yu	15	15
(Indonesia) Eddy Ismanto	8	9
(Indonesia) Icuk Sugiarto	15	15
(Canada) Ian Johnson	4	4
(South Korea) Sung Han-kuk	15	15
(Malaysia) Chong Weng Kai	15	6	9

Third round
(China) Xiong Guobao	15	15
(Hong Kong) Sze Yu	10	11
(Indonesia) Icuk Sugiarto	15	15
(South Korea) Sung Han-kuk	9	7

Quarterfinals
(China) Xiong Guobao	7	13
(Indonesia) Icuk Sugiarto	15	15

== Final stage ==
Quarterfinals
1	(Denmark) Morten Frost	15	15
8	(Malaysia) Rashid Sidek	7	5
4	(China) Zhao Jianhua	15	15
5	(China) Zhang Qingwu	4	2
3	(Denmark) Ib Frederiksen	3	15	9
6	(China) Yang Yang	15	11	15
2	(China) Xiong Guobao	7	13
7	(Indonesia) Icuk Sugiarto	15	15

Semifinals
(Denmark) Morten Frost	15	15
(China) Zhao Jianhua	12	11
(China) Yang Yang	15	15
(Indonesia) Icuk Sugiarto	11	5

Finals
(Denmark) Morten Frost	2	15	12
(China) Yang Yang	15	13	15
