= 1988 Indonesia Open (badminton) =

Badminton championships

The 1988 Indonesia Open is one of the 10 best badminton tournaments in Asia. Held in Jakarta from 20 to 24 July 1988. The total prize money is $135,000.

== Final results ==
Category	Winners	Runners-up	Score
Men's singles	(Indonesia) Icuk Sugiarto	(Indonesia) Lius Pongoh	15-6, 15-4
Women's singles	(China) Li Lingwei	(South Korea) Hwang Hye-young	11-5, 11-6
Men's doubles	(Malaysia) Razif Sidek & Jalani Sidek	(China) Chen Kang & Chen Hongyong	16-18, 15–5, 15-2
Women's doubles	(Indonesia) Verawaty Fajrin & Yanti Kusmiati	(South Korea) Chung Myung-hee & Hwang Hye-young	15-6, 6–15, 15-8
Mixed doubles	(Indonesia) Eddy Hartono & Erma Sulistianingsih	(Indonesia) Bobby Ertanto & Verawaty Fajrin	15-9, 15-11
