= Badminton at the 1988 Summer Olympics =

Badminton at the Games of the XXIV Olympiad
- Venue: Seoul National University Gymnasium
- Dates: 19 September 1988
- No. of events: 5 (2 men, 2 women, 1 mixed)

Badminton was an exhibition sport at the 1988 Summer Olympics in Seoul. There were five events: men's singles, women's singles, men's doubles, women's doubles, and mixed doubles. Competitions took place at the Seoul National University Gymnasium on 19 September 1988.

== Qualification ==
The competitors were selected according to the results of the 1987 IBF World Championships.

== Medallists ==
Event	Gold	Silver	Bronze
Men's singles	Yang Yang; China	Icuk Sugiarto; Indonesia	Park Sung-bae; South Korea
Men's doubles	Li Yongbo and Tian Bingyi (CHN)	Lee Sang-bok and Lee Gwang-jin (KOR)	Shuji Matsuno and Shinji Matsuura (JPN)
Women's singles	Hwang Hye-young; South Korea	Han Aiping; China	Sumiko Kitada; Japan
Women's doubles	Kim Yun-ja and Chung So-young (KOR)	Lin Ying and Guan Weizhen (CHN)	Dorte Kjær and Nettie Nielsen (DEN)
Mixed doubles	Park Joo-bong and Chung Myung-hee (KOR)	Wang Pengren and Shi Fangjing (CHN)	Chan Chi Choi and Amy Chan Lim Chee (HKG)

== Medal table ==
Rank	Nation	Gold	Silver	Bronze	Total
1	South Korea	3	1	1	5
2	China	2	3	0	5
3	Indonesia	0	1	0	1
4	Japan	0	0	2	2
5	Denmark	0	0	1	1
5	Hong Kong	0	0	1	1
Totals (6 entries)		5	5	5	15

== Participating nations ==
- China
- Denmark
- Indonesia
- Japan
- Sweden
- Hong Kong
- Great Britain
- Canada
- South Korea
