= 1987 IBF World Championships – Mixed doubles =

Mixed doubles at the 1987 IBF World Championships
- Venue: Capital Indoor Stadium
- Location: Beijing, China
- Dates: May 18, 1987 – May 24, 1987

Medalists
gold medal	Wang Pengren; Shi Fangjing	China
silver medal	Lee Deuk-choon; Chung Myung-hee	South Korea
bronze medal	Martin Dew; Gillian Gilks	England
bronze medal	He Yiming; Yang Xinfang	China

The 1987 IBF World Championships (World Badminton Championships) were held in Beijing, China, in 1987. Following the results of the mixed doubles. (Note: Results of the first rounds incomplete.)

== Main stage ==
=== Section 1 ===
First round
(South Korea) Lee Deuk-choon (South Korea) Chung Myung-hee
(South Korea) Lee Sang-bok (South Korea) Kim Ho-ja

Second round
(South Korea) Lee Deuk-choon (South Korea) Chung Myung-hee
(South Korea) Lee Sang-bok (South Korea) Kim Ho-ja

Third round
(South Korea) Lee Deuk-choon (South Korea) Chung Myung-hee
(South Korea) Lee Sang-bok (South Korea) Kim Ho-ja

Quarterfinals
(South Korea) Lee Deuk-choon (South Korea) Chung Myung-hee	15	15
(South Korea) Lee Sang-bok (South Korea) Kim Ho-ja	6	7

=== Section 2 ===
First round
(China) He Yiming (China) Yang Xinfang
(Sweden) Jan-Eric Antonsson (Sweden) Christine Magnusson

Second round
(China) He Yiming (China) Yang Xinfang
(Sweden) Jan-Eric Antonsson (Sweden) Christine Magnusson

Third round
(China) He Yiming (China) Yang Xinfang
(Sweden) Jan-Eric Antonsson (Sweden) Christine Magnusson

Quarterfinals
(China) He Yiming (China) Yang Xinfang	9	17	15
(Sweden) Jan-Eric Antonsson (Sweden) Christine Magnusson	15	14	9

=== Section 3 ===
First round
(China) Wang Pengren (China) Shi Fangjing
(South Korea) Park Joo-bong (South Korea) Kim Yun Ja

Second round
(China) Wang Pengren (China) Shi Fangjing
(South Korea) Park Joo-bong (South Korea) Kim Yun Ja

Third round
(China) Wang Pengren (China) Shi Fangjing
(South Korea) Park Joo-bong (South Korea) Kim Yun Ja

Quarterfinals
(China) Wang Pengren (China) Shi Fangjing	15	18
(South Korea) Park Joo-bong (South Korea) Kim Yun Ja	5	17

=== Section 4 ===
First round
(England) Martin Dew (England) Gillian Gilks
(China) Li Ang (China) Pan Zhenli

Second round
(England) Martin Dew (England) Gillian Gilks
(China) Li Ang (China) Pan Zhenli

Third round
(England) Martin Dew (England) Gillian Gilks
(China) Li Ang (China) Pan Zhenli

Quarterfinals
(England) Martin Dew (England) Gillian Gilks	15	15
(China) Li Ang (China) Pan Zhenli	7	13

== Final stage ==
Quarterfinals
(South Korea) Lee Deuk-choon (South Korea) Chung Myung-hee	15	15
(South Korea) Lee Sang-bok (South Korea) Kim Ho-ja	6	7
(China) He Yiming (China) Yang Xinfang	9	17	15
(Sweden) Jan-Eric Antonsson (Sweden) Christine Magnusson	15	14	9
(China) Wang Pengren (China) Shi Fangjing	15	18
(South Korea) Park Joo-bong (South Korea) Kim Yun Ja	5	17
(England) Martin Dew (England) Gillian Gilks	15	15
(China) Li Ang (China) Pan Zhenli	7	13

Semifinals
(South Korea) Lee Deuk-choon (South Korea) Chung Myung-hee	15	11	15
(China) He Yiming (China) Yang Xinfang	6	15	10
(China) Wang Pengren (China) Shi Fangjing	15	15
(England) Martin Dew (England) Gillian Gilks	7	8

Finals
(South Korea) Lee Deuk-choon (South Korea) Chung Myung-hee	2	15	9
(China) Wang Pengren (China) Shi Fangjing	15	8	15
