= Shi Fangjing =

Chinese badminton player (born 1965)

Shi Fangjing 史方静
Personal information
- Born: 1965 (age 60–61) Shanghai, China
- Height: 171 cm (5 ft 7 in)

Sport
- Country: China
- Sport: Badminton
- Handedness: Right
- Event: Women's doubles & Mixed doubles
Medal record
Women's badminton
Representing China
World Championships
Gold medal – first place	1987 Beijing	Mixed doubles
Bronze medal – third place	1989 Jakarta	Mixed doubles
World Cup
Gold medal – first place	1987 Kuala Lumpur	Mixed doubles
Gold medal – first place	1988 Bangkok	Mixed doubles
Uber Cup
Gold medal – first place	1990 Tokyo	Women's team
Sudirman Cup
Bronze medal – third place	1989 Jakarta	Mixed team
Asian Games
Gold medal – first place	1990 Beijing	Women's team
Bronze medal – third place	1990 Beijing	Mixed doubles

Shi Fangjing (Chinese: 史方静, born 1965) is a former world level women's badminton player from China.

== Career ==
A doubles specialist, Shi Fangjing won both women's doubles and mixed doubles at the Polish Open consecutively in 1985 and 1986, each with a different partner. Her biggest titles in badminton, however, all came with countryman Wang Pengren in mixed doubles. They were the surprise gold medalists at the 1987 IBF World Championships in Beijing, and subsequently captured the Badminton World Cup in both 1987 and 1988, the Swedish Open, World Badminton Grand Prix, the venerable All England Championships in 1988, and the French Open in 1989. In defense of their title, they were bronze medalists (semifinalists) at the next edition of the IBF World Championships in 1989. Shi starts to decline in performance after that bronze medal performance. Despite that, Shi was chosen for 1990 Uber Cup team and manage to win four out of five matches. She only lost in the dead rubber final match with her pairing Guan Weizhen when the title is already sealed. She retired after winning the bronze medal in 1990 Asian Games and currently, she is a coach of Shanghai badminton team.

== Achievements ==
=== Olympic Games ===
Mixed doubles
Year	Venue	Partner	Opponent	Score	Result
1988 (exhibition)	Seoul National University Gymnasium; Seoul, South Korea	(China) Wang Pengren	(South Korea) Park Joo-bong (South Korea) Chung Myung-hee	3–15, 7–15	Silver

=== World Championships ===
Mixed doubles
Year	Venue	Partner	Opponent	Score	Result
1987	Capital Indoor Stadium, Beijing, China	(China) Wang Pengren	(South Korea) Lee Deuk-choon (South Korea) Chung Myung-hee	15–2, 8–15, 15–9	Gold
1989	Istora Senayan, Jakarta, Indonesia	(China) Wang Pengren	(Indonesia) Eddy Hartono (Indonesia) Verawaty Fadjrin	6–15, 15–9, 4–15	Bronze

=== World Cup ===
Mixed doubles
Year	Venue	Partner	Opponent	Score	Result
1987	Stadium Negara, Kuala Lumpur, Malaysia	(China) Wang Pengren	(Denmark) Steen Fladberg (England) Gillian Clark	15–11, 1–15, 15–4	Gold
1988	National Stadium, Bangkok, Thailand	(China) Wang Pengren	(South Korea) Park Joo-bong (South Korea) Chung Myung-hee	15–17, 18–13, 15–8	Gold

=== Asian Games ===
Mixed doubles
Year	Venue	Partner	Opponent	Score	Result
1990	Beijing Gymnasium, Beijing, China	(China) Zheng Yumin	(Indonesia) Eddy Hartono (Indonesia) Verawaty Fadjrin	16–18, 12–15	Bronze

=== IBF World Grand Prix ===
The World Badminton Grand Prix sanctioned by International Badminton Federation (IBF) since from 1983 to 2006.

Mixed doubles
Year	Tournament	Partner	Opponent	Score	Result
1988	Swedish Open	(China) Wang Pengren	(Denmark) Jon Holst-Christensen (Denmark) Helle Andersen	15–9, 15–6	(gold) Winner
1988	All England Open	(China) Wang Pengren	(Denmark) Jesper Knudsen (Denmark) Nettie Nielsen	15–2, 18–13	(gold) Winner
1988	Thailand Open	(China) Wang Pengren	(Denmark) Steen Fladberg (England) Gillian Clark	14–17, 15–4, 9–15	(silver) Runner-Up
1988	China Open	(China) Wang Pengren	(South Korea) Park Joo-bong (South Korea) Chung Myung-hee	6–15, 5–15	(silver) Runner-Up
1988	Malaysia Open	(China) Wang Pengren	(Indonesia) Eddy Hartono (Indonesia) Verawaty Fadjrin	9–15, 7–15	(silver) Runner-Up
1988	World Grand Prix Finals	(China) Wang Pengren	(England) Andy Goode (England) Gillian Gowers	15–6, 15–6	(gold) Winner
1989	Swedish Open	(China) Wang Pengren	(South Korea) Park Joo-bong (South Korea) Chung Myung-hee	9–15, 4–15	(silver) Runner-Up
1989	French Open	(China) Wang Pengren	(China) Jiang Guoliang (China) Nong Qunhua	12–15, 15–5, 15–11	(gold) Winner

=== IBF International ===
Women's doubles
Year	Tournament	Partner	Opponent	Score	Result
1985	Polish International	(China) Sun Xiaoqing	(China) Luo Yun (China) Shang Fumei	15–3, 10–15, 15–7	(gold) Winner
1986	Polish International	(China) Wu Yuhong	(China) Li Feng (China) Lin Yanfen	15–3, 15–4	(gold) Winner

Mixed doubles
Year	Tournament	Partner	Opponent	Score	Result
1985	Polish International	(China) Wang Pengren	(China) Shu Yiong (China) Sun Xiaoqing	15–7, 15–6	(gold) Winner
1986	Polish International	(China) Wang Pengren	(Poland) Jerzy Dołhan (Poland) Bożena Haracz	15–8, 15–3	(gold) Winner
