= 1989 IBF World Championships =

Tournament details
- Dates: 29 May – 4 June
- Edition: 6th
- Level: International
- Venue: Istora Senayan
- Location: Jakarta, Indonesia

The 1989 IBF World Championships the sixth edition of the IBF World Championships which were held in Jakarta, Indonesia, in 1989.

== Venue ==
- Istora Senayan

== Medalists ==
=== Medal table ===
* Host nation (Indonesia)

Rank	Nation	Gold	Silver	Bronze	Total
1	China	4	2	4	10
2	South Korea	1	1	0	2
3	Indonesia*	0	2	4	6
4	Malaysia	0	0	1	1
4	Sweden	0	0	1	1
Totals (5 entries)		5	5	10	20

=== Medalists ===
Event	Gold	Silver	Bronze
Men's singles	(China) Yang Yang	(Indonesia) Ardy Wiranata	(Indonesia) Icuk Sugiarto
Men's singles	(China) Yang Yang	(Indonesia) Ardy Wiranata	(Indonesia) Eddy Kurniawan
Women's singles	(China) Li Lingwei	(China) Huang Hua	(China) Tang Jiuhong
Women's singles	(China) Li Lingwei	(China) Huang Hua	(Indonesia) Sawendah Kusumawardani
Men's doubles	(China) Li Yongbo (China) Tian Bingyi	(China) Chen Kang (China) Chen Hongyong	(Malaysia) Razif Sidek (Malaysia) Jalani Sidek
Men's doubles	(China) Li Yongbo (China) Tian Bingyi	(China) Chen Kang (China) Chen Hongyong	(Indonesia) Rudy Gunawan (Indonesia) Eddy Hartono
Women's doubles	(China) Lin Ying (China) Guan Weizhen	(South Korea) Chung Myung-hee (South Korea) Hwang Hye-young	(Sweden) Maria Bengtsson (Sweden) Christine Magnusson
Women's doubles	(China) Lin Ying (China) Guan Weizhen	(South Korea) Chung Myung-hee (South Korea) Hwang Hye-young	(China) Sun Xiaoqing (China) Zhou Lei
Mixed doubles	(South Korea) Park Joo-bong (South Korea) Chung Myung-hee	(Indonesia) Eddy Hartono (Indonesia) Verawaty Fajrin	(China) Wu Chibing (China) Yang Xinfang
Mixed doubles	(South Korea) Park Joo-bong (South Korea) Chung Myung-hee	(Indonesia) Eddy Hartono (Indonesia) Verawaty Fajrin	(China) Wang Pengren (China) Shi Fangjing
