= 1987 Badminton World Cup =

Badminton championships

Tournament details
- Dates: 30 September – 4 October 1987
- Edition: 9th
- Total prize money: US$122,000
- Venue: Stadium Negara
- Location: Kuala Lumpur, Malaysia

The 1987 Badminton World Cup was the ninth edition of an international tournament Badminton World Cup. The event was held in 1987. China won titles in all disciplines except men's doubles event, which was secured by South Korea.

== Medalists ==
Event	Gold	Silver	Bronze
Men's singles	(China) Zhao Jianhua	(China) Yang Yang	(China) Xiong Guobao
Men's singles	(China) Zhao Jianhua	(China) Yang Yang	(Indonesia) Alan Budikusuma
Women's singles	(China) Li Lingwei	(China) Han Aiping	(Indonesia) Elizabeth Latief
Women's singles	(China) Li Lingwei	(China) Han Aiping	(China) Zheng Yuli
Men's doubles	(South Korea) Kim Moon-soo (South Korea) Park Joo-bong	(China) Li Yongbo (China) Tian Bingyi	(Indonesia) Eddy Hartono (Indonesia) Liem Swie King
Men's doubles	(South Korea) Kim Moon-soo (South Korea) Park Joo-bong	(China) Li Yongbo (China) Tian Bingyi	(Malaysia) Jalani Sidek (Malaysia) Razif Sidek
Women's doubles	(China) Han Aiping (China) Li Lingwei	(China) Guan Weizhen (China) Lin Ying	(South Korea) Chung Myung-hee (South Korea) Hwang Hye-young
Women's doubles	(China) Han Aiping (China) Li Lingwei	(China) Guan Weizhen (China) Lin Ying	(Indonesia) Rosiana Tendean (Indonesia) Verawaty Fajrin
Mixed doubles	(China) Wang Pengren (China) Shi Fangjing	(Denmark) Steen Fladberg (England) Gillian Clark	(South Korea) Lee Deuk-choon (South Korea) Chung Myung-hee
Mixed doubles	(China) Wang Pengren (China) Shi Fangjing	(Denmark) Steen Fladberg (England) Gillian Clark	(Denmark) Jan Paulsen (England) Gillian Gowers

== Men's singles ==
=== Finals ===
Semi-finals
(China) Zhao Jianhua	18	15
(Indonesia) Alan Budikusuma	13	4
(China) Xiong Guobao	9	5
(China) Yang Yang	15	15

Final
(China) Zhao Jianhua	6	15	15
(China) Yang Yang	15	2	12

== Women's singles ==
=== Finals ===
Semi-finals
(China) Han Aiping	12	11
(China) Zheng Yuli	11	5
(Indonesia) Elizabeth Latief	5	10
(China) Li Lingwei	11	12

Final
(China) Han Aiping	8	8
(China) Li Lingwei	11	11

== Men's doubles ==
=== Finals ===
Semi-finals
(South Korea) Kim Moon-soo (South Korea) Park Joo-bong	15	13	15
(Indonesia) Eddy Hartono (Indonesia) Liem Swie King	7	18	13
(Malaysia) Jalani Sidek (Malaysia) Razif Sidek	6	12
(China) Li Yongbo (China) Tian Bingyi	15	15

Final
(South Korea) Kim Moon-soo (South Korea) Park Joo-bong	15	6	15
(China) Li Yongbo (China) Tian Bingyi	6	15	11

== Women's doubles ==
=== Finals ===
Semi-finals
(China) Guan Weizhen (China) Lin Ying	18	15
(South Korea) Chung Myung-hee (South Korea) Hwang Hye-young	14	8
(China) Han Aiping (China) Li Lingwei	3	15	15
(Indonesia) Rosiana Tendean (Indonesia) Verawaty Fajrin	15	10	12

Final
(China) Guan Weizhen (China) Lin Ying	10	15	5
(China) Han Aiping (China) Li Lingwei	15	11	15

== Mixed doubles ==
=== Finals ===
Semi-finals
(China) Wang Pengren (China) Shi Fangjing	15	15
(Denmark) Jan Paulsen (England) Gillian Gowers	10	7
(South Korea) Lee Deuk-choon (South Korea) Chung Myung-hee	8	9
(Denmark) Steen Fladberg (England) Gillian Clark	15	15

Final
(China) Wang Pengren (China) Shi Fangjing	15	1	15
(Denmark) Steen Fladberg (England) Gillian Clark	11	15	4
