= Polish Open (badminton) =

Badminton championships

The Polish Open in badminton is an international open held in Poland since 1975. In the years before the fall of communism in the country this was one of a few meeting places between badminton players from the Eastern Bloc countries. The tournament belongs to the European Badminton Circuit and is graded as a BWF International Challenge. It is not to be confused with the Polish International, a lower grade tournament that also takes place in Poland.

== Previous winners ==
Year	Men's singles	Women's singles	Men's doubles	Women's doubles	Mixed doubles	Ref
1975	(East Germany) Edgar Michalowski	(East Germany) Monika Cassens	(East Germany) Edgar Michalowski (East Germany) Erfried Michalowsky	(East Germany) Monika Cassens (East Germany) Angela Michalowski	(East Germany) Edgar Michalowski (East Germany) Monika Cassens	
1976	(East Germany) Edgar Michalowski	(East Germany) Monika Cassens	(East Germany) Edgar Michalowski (East Germany) Erfried Michalowsky	(East Germany) Monika Cassens (East Germany) Angela Michalowski	(East Germany) Erfried Michalowsky (East Germany) Angela Michalowski	
1977	(Czechoslovakia) Michal Malý	(East Germany) Monika Cassens	(Czechoslovakia) Michal Malý (Czechoslovakia) Karel Lakomý	(East Germany) Monika Cassens (East Germany) Angela Michalowski	(East Germany) Edgar Michalowski (East Germany) Monika Cassens	
1978	(West Germany) Georg Simon	(East Germany) Monika Cassens	(West Germany) Georg Simon (West Germany) Rolf Heyer	(East Germany) Monika Cassens (East Germany) Christine Ober	(East Germany) Edgar Michalowski (East Germany) Monika Cassens	
1979	(East Germany) Edgar Michalowski	(East Germany) Monika Cassens	(Sweden) Thomas Kihlström (Sweden) Tor Sundberg	(East Germany) Monika Cassens (East Germany) Angela Michalowski	(East Germany) Edgar Michalowski (East Germany) Monika Cassens	
1980	(Czechoslovakia) Michal Malý	(East Germany) Monika Cassens	(Czechoslovakia) Michal Malý (Czechoslovakia) Karel Lakomý	(East Germany) Monika Cassens (East Germany) Ilona Michalowsky	(East Germany) Edgar Michalowski (East Germany) Monika Cassens	
1981	(Czechoslovakia) Michal Malý	(Switzerland) Liselotte Blumer	(Czechoslovakia) Michal Malý (Czechoslovakia) Karel Lakomý	(England) Catharine Troke (England) Gillian Gowers	(England) Nigel Tier (England) Catharine Troke	
1982	(Czechoslovakia) Michal Malý	(Switzerland) Liselotte Blumer	(Wales) Barry Burns (Wales) Mark Richards	(Poland) Bożena Wojtkowska (Poland) Ewa Rusznica	(East Germany) Erfried Michalowsky (East Germany) Monika Cassens	
1983	(China) Zhang Qiang	(China) Shi Wen	(China) Lu Hengwen (China) Zheng Zhijun	(China) Chen Guirong (China) Shi Wen	(China) Zhang Qiang (China) Shi Wen	
1984	(Denmark) Bengt Svenningsen	(China) Gao Meifeng	(China) Zhang Xinguang (China) Wang Jian	(China) Gao Meifeng (China) Nong Qunhua	(China) Zhang Xinguang (China) Gao Meifeng	
1985	(China) Zheng Zhijun	(China) Luo Yun	(China) Wang Pengren (China) Shu Yiong	(China) Shi Fangjing (China) Sun Xiaoqing	(China) Wang Pengren (China) Shi Fangjing	
1986	(China) Zhang Qingwu	(China) Wu Yuhong	(China) Huang Zhen (China) Chen Hongyong	(China) Shi Fangjing (China) Wu Yuhong	(China) Wang Pengren (China) Shi Fangjing	
1987	(England) Anders Nielsen	(Soviet Union) Irina Rozhkova	(Sweden) Peter Axelsson (Sweden) Jens Olsson	(Poland) Bożena Haracz (Poland) Bożena Siemieniec	(Soviet Union) Andrey Antropov (Soviet Union) Viktoria Pron	
1988	(Sweden) Peter Axelsson	(South Korea) Lee Young-suk	(South Korea) Park Joo-bong (South Korea) Lee Sang-bok	(South Korea) Chung Myung-hee (South Korea) Hwang Hye-young	(South Korea) Park Joo-bong (South Korea) Chung Myung-hee	
1989	No competition					
1990	(Indonesia) Fung Permadi	(China) Chen Ying	(Denmark) Thomas Stuer-Lauridsen (Denmark) Christian Jacobsen	(China) Chen Ying (China) Sheng Wengqing	(Denmark) Christian Jacobsen (Denmark) Marlene Thomsen	
1991	(Indonesia) Bambang Suprianto	(Indonesia) Yuliani Sentosa	(Indonesia) Richard Mainaky (Indonesia) Ricky Subagja	(Indonesia) Catherine (Indonesia) Eliza Nathanael	(China) Liu Jianjun (China) Wang Xiaoyuan	
1992	(England) Steve Butler	(Russia) Marina Yakusheva	(Denmark) Max Gandrup (Denmark) Christian Jacobsen	(Russia) Marina Yakusheva (Sweden) Marina Andrievskaia	(Denmark) Christian Jacobsen (Denmark) Marianne Rasmussen	
1993	(Indonesia) Lioe Tiong Ping	(Denmark) Anne Sondergaard	(Indonesia) S. Antonius Budi Ariantho (Indonesia) Denny Kantono	(Denmark) Anne Sondergaard (Denmark) Lotte Thomsen	(Indonesia) Rudy Gunawan (Indonesia) Rosiana Tendean	
1994	(Indonesia) Indra Wijaya	(Sweden) Margit Borg	(Indonesia) Ade Sutrisna (Indonesia) Candra Wijaya	(Indonesia) Eny Oktaviani (Indonesia) Nonong Denis Zanati	(Indonesia) Flandy Limpele (Indonesia) Dede Hasanah	
1995	(Indonesia) Budi Santoso	(Indonesia) Olivia	(Indonesia) Hadi Sugianto (Indonesia) Seng Kok Keong	(Indonesia) Emma Ermawati (Indonesia) Indarti Isolina	(Indonesia) I. Paulus (Indonesia) Rosalia Anastasia	
1996	(China) Yu Lizhi	(Indonesia) Meiluawati	(China) Tao Xiaoqiang (China) Ge Cheng	(Sweden) Christine Magnusson (Sweden) Marina Andrievskaia	(China) Chen Xingdong (China) Peng Xingyong	
1997	(Hong Kong) Tam Kai Chuen	(Indonesia) Yuli Marfuah	(Indonesia) Tony Gunawan (Indonesia) Victo Wibowo	(Indonesia) Etty Tantri (Indonesia) Cynthia Tuwankotta	(Indonesia) Flandy Limpele (Indonesia) Etty Tantri	
1998	(Sweden) Daniel Eriksson	(Russia) Elena Sukhareva	(England) Julian Robertson (England) Nathan Robertson	(Denmark) Ann-Lou Jørgensen (Denmark) Tine Rasmussen	(Denmark) Lars Paaske (Denmark) Jane F. Bramsen	
1999	(Australia) Rio Suryana	(Ukraine) Elena Nozdran	(Poland) Michał Łogosz (Poland) Robert Mateusiak	(Malaysia) Ang Li Peng (Malaysia) Chor Hooi Yee	(Hong Kong) Ma Che Kong (Hong Kong) Koon Wai Chee	
2000	(Ukraine) Vladislav Druzchenko	(Japan) Takako Ida	(Malaysia) Chang Kim Wai (Malaysia) Hong Chieng Hun	(Japan) Haruko Matsuda (Japan) Yoshiko Iwata	(China) Chen Qiqiu (China) Chen Lin	
2001	No competition					
2002	(Poland) Przemysław Wacha	(Poland) Kamila Augustyn	(Poland) Michał Łogosz (Poland) Robert Mateusiak	(Poland) Kamila Augustyn (Poland) Nadieżda Kostiuczyk	(Canada) Mike Beres (Canada) Kara Solmundson	
2003	(Denmark) Kasper Ødum	(Germany) Xu Huaiwen	(Poland) Michał Łogosz (Poland) Robert Mateusiak	(Poland) Kamila Augustyn (Poland) Nadieżda Kostiuczyk	(Sweden) Jörgen Olsson (Sweden) Frida Andreasson	
2004	(China) Chen Jin	(China) Lu Lan	(China) Guo Zhendong (China) Xie Zhongbo	(China) Du Jing (China) Yu Yang	(Ukraine) Vladislav Druzchenko (Ukraine) Elena Nozdran	
2005	(Poland) Przemysław Wacha	(Bulgaria) Petya Nedeltcheva	(Poland) Michał Łogosz (Poland) Robert Mateusiak	(Poland) Kamila Augustyn (Poland) Nadieżda Kostiuczyk	(Poland) Robert Mateusiak (Poland) Nadieżda Kostiuczyk	
2006	(Poland) Przemysław Wacha	(Indonesia) Atu Rosalina	(Poland) Michał Łogosz (Poland) Robert Mateusiak	(Poland) Kamila Augustyn (Poland) Nadieżda Kostiuczyk	(Poland) Robert Mateusiak (Poland) Nadieżda Kostiuczyk	
2007	(Ukraine) Vladislav Druzchenko	(Japan) Chie Umezu	(Denmark) Mikkel Delbo Larsen (Denmark) Jacob Chemnitz	(Poland) Kamila Augustyn (Poland) Nadieżda Kostiuczyk	(Poland) Robert Mateusiak (Poland) Nadieżda Kostiuczyk	
2008	(Germany) Marc Zwiebler	(Germany) Juliane Schenk	(Poland) Michał Łogosz (Poland) Robert Mateusiak	(Indonesia) Shendy Puspa Irawati (Indonesia) Meiliana Jauhari	(Poland) Robert Mateusiak (Poland) Nadieżda Kostiuczyk	
2009	(Netherlands) Dicky Palyama	(Poland) Wang Linling	(Chinese Taipei) Lin Yu-lang (Chinese Taipei) Chen Hung-ling	(Bulgaria) Diana Dimova (Bulgaria) Petya Nedelcheva	(Poland) Michał Łogosz (Poland) Olga Konon	
2010	(Spain) Pablo Abián	(Japan) Kana Ito	(Russia) Vladimir Ivanov (Russia) Ivan Sozonov	(Singapore) Shinta Mulia Sari (Singapore) Yao Lei	(Russia) Andrey Ashmarin (Russia) Anastasia Prokopenko	
2011	(Spain) Pablo Abián	(Ukraine) Larisa Griga	(Russia) Vladimir Ivanov (Russia) Ivan Sozonov	(Japan) Rie Eto (Japan) Yu Wakita	(Poland) Robert Mateusiak (Poland) Nadieżda Zięba	
2012	(Chinese Taipei) Hsu Jen-hao	(Japan) Ai Goto	(Russia) Vladimir Ivanov (Russia) Ivan Sozonov	(England) Mariana Agathangelou (England) Heather Olver	(England) Nathan Robertson (England) Jenny Wallwork	
2013	(Russia) Vladimir Malkov	(Japan) Shizuka Uchida	(Poland) Adam Cwalina (Poland) Przemysław Wacha	(Japan) Rie Eto (Japan) Yu Wakita	(Poland) Robert Mateusiak (Poland) Nadieżda Zięba	
2014	(France) Brice Leverdez	(Japan) Yuka Kusunose	(Poland) Adam Cwalina (Poland) Przemysław Wacha	(Russia) Anastasia Chervaykova (Russia) Nina Vislova	(Russia) Vitalij Durkin (Russia) Nina Vislova	
2015	(Malaysia) Daren Liew	(Germany) Karin Schnaase	(Japan) Kenta Kazuno (Japan) Kazushi Yamada	(India) Pradnya Gadre (India) N. Siki Reddy	(Malaysia) Chan Peng Soon (Malaysia) Goh Liu Ying	
2016	(France) Thomas Rouxel	(France) Delphine Lansac	(Indonesia) Hardianto (Indonesia) Kenas Adi Haryanto	(Thailand) Puttita Supajirakul (Thailand) Sapsiree Taerattanachai	(Poland) Robert Mateusiak (Poland) Nadieżda Zięba	
2017	(Malaysia) Tan Jia Wei	(Japan) Yui Hashimoto	(Poland) Łukasz Moreń (Poland) Wojciech Skudlarczyk	(Indonesia) Yulfira Barkah (Indonesia) Meirisa Cindy Sahputri	(Poland) Robert Mateusiak (Poland) Nadieżda Zięba	
2018	Cancelled					
2019	(Thailand) Kunlavut Vitidsarn	(China) Wei Yaxin	(Chinese Taipei) Lee Jhe-huei (Chinese Taipei) Yang Po-hsuan	(Japan) Chisato Hoshi (Japan) Aoi Matsuda	(England) Ben Lane (England) Jessica Pugh	
2020	Cancelled (Note: This tournament, originally to be played from 26 to 29 March, was later cancelled due to the COVID-19 pandemic in Poland.)					
2021	(Malaysia) Ng Tze Yong	(Estonia) Kristin Kuuba	(Malaysia) Man Wei Chong (Malaysia) Tee Kai Wun	(Turkey) Bengisu Erçetin (Turkey) Nazlıcan İnci	(Malaysia) Choong Hon Jian (Malaysia) Toh Ee Wei	
2022	(India) Kiran George	(India) Anupama Upadhyaya	(Denmark) Rasmus Kjær (Denmark) Frederik Søgaard	(Hong Kong) Yeung Nga Ting (Hong Kong) Yeung Pui Lam	(Chinese Taipei) Ye Hong-wei (Chinese Taipei) Lee Chia-hsin	
2023	(France) Alex Lanier	(Singapore) Yeo Jia Min	(Denmark) Daniel Lundgaard (Denmark) Mads Vestergaard	(Singapore) Jin Yujia (Singapore) Crystal Wong	(Denmark) Mads Vestergaard (Denmark) Christine Busch	
2024	(Denmark) Victor Ørding Kauffmann	(India) Anupama Upadhyaya	(India) Arjun M. R. (India) Dhruv Kapila	(Chinese Taipei) Hsu Yin-hui (Chinese Taipei) Lin Jhih-yun	(Canada) Ty Alexander Lindeman (Canada) Josephine Wu	
2025	(France) Arnaud Merklé	(Turkey) Neslihan Arın	(Chinese Taipei) Su Ching-heng (Chinese Taipei) Wu Guan-xun	(United States) Lauren Lam (United States) Allison Lee	(Indonesia) Rehan Naufal Kusharjanto (Indonesia) Gloria Emanuelle Widjaja	
2026	(Singapore) Jason Teh	(India) Unnati Hooda	(Germany) Malik Bourakkadi (Germany) Kenneth Neumann	(England) Abbygael Harris (England) Lizzie Tolman	(Japan) Hiroki Midorikawa (Japan) Nami Matsuyama	

== Performance by nation ==
As of the 2026 edition

Pos	Nation	MS	WS	MD	WD	XD	Total
1	China	5	7	6	6	7	31
2	Poland	3	2	9	7	9	30
3	Indonesia	5	5	6	6	5	27
4	East Germany	3	6	2	6	7	24
5	Denmark	3	1	5	2	4	15
6	Japan		7	1	4	1	13
7	Russia	1	2	3	1.5	2	9.5
8	England	2		1	3	3	9
9	Malaysia	3		2	1	2	8
10	Sweden	2	1	2	1.5	1	7.5
11	Czechoslovakia	4		3			7
11	Germany	2	3	2			7
13	Chinese Taipei	1		3	1	1	6
13	India	1	3	1	1		6
15	France	4	1				5
15	Ukraine	2	2			1	5
17	Singapore	1	1		2		4
17	South Korea		1	1	1	1	4
19	Hong Kong	1			1	1	3
20	Bulgaria		1		1		2
20	Canada					2	2
20	Soviet Union		1			1	2
20	Spain	2					2
20	Switzerland		2				2
20	Thailand	1			1		2
20	Turkey		1		1		2
27	Australia	1					1
27	Estonia		1				1
27	Netherlands	1					1
27	United States				1		1
27	Wales			1			1
Total		48	48	48	48	48	240
