= 1988 World Badminton Grand Prix Finals =

Tournament details
- Dates: 4–8 January 1989
- Edition: 6
- Total prize money: US$176,050
- Location: Hong Kong

The 1988 World Badminton Grand Prix was the sixth edition of the World Badminton Grand Prix finals. It was held in Hong Kong, from January 4 to January 8, 1989.

== Final results ==
Category	Winners	Runners-up	Score
Men's singles	(China) Zhang Qingwu	(China) Xiong Guobao	15–10, 4–15, 15–8
Women's singles	(China) Han Aiping	(South Korea) Lee Young-suk	11–1, 11–5
Men's doubles	(Malaysia) Jalani Sidek & Razif Sidek	(Indonesia) Eddy Hartono & Rudy Gunawan	10–15, 15–6, 15–8
Women's doubles	(China) Guan Weizhen & Lin Ying	(South Korea) Hwang Hye-young & Chung Myung-hee	15–4, 15–9
Mixed doubles	(China) Wang Pengren & Shi Fangjing	(England) Andy Goode & Gillian Gowers	15–6, 15–6
