= 1989 Sudirman Cup =

1989 Sudirman Cup Piala Sudirman 1989
Tournament details
- Dates: 24–29 May
- Edition: 1st
- Level: International
- Venue: Istora Senayan
- Location: Jakarta, Indonesia

The 1989 Sudirman Cup was the first tournament of the World Mixed Team Badminton Championships, the Sudirman Cup. It was held from May 24 to May 29, 1989, in Central Jakarta, Indonesia.

== Host city selection ==
In May 1988, the International Badminton Federation approved the inauguration of the world mixed team championships and announced that the championships would be inaugurated in Jakarta, Indonesia.

== Teams ==
28 teams around the world took part in this tournament. Geographically, they were 13 from Europe, 10 teams from Asia, two from Americas, two from Oceania and one from Africa. India and Pakistan entered the competition but ultimately did not participate.

== Draw ==
The draw was announced in April 1989, a month prior to the championships.

=== Group composition ===
Group 1		Group 2	Group 3
Group 1A	Group 1B	Group 2	Group 3
England; Indonesia; South Korea	China; Denmark; Sweden	Japan; Malaysia; Netherlands; Soviet Union	Canada; India; Chinese Taipei; Thailand

Group 4	Group 5	Group 6	Group 7
Australia; West Germany; Hong Kong; Scotland	Finland; New Zealand; United States; Austria	Nepal; Norway; Pakistan; Sri Lanka	Bulgaria; France; Mauritius

== Group stage ==
=== Group 1 ===
==== Subgroup A ====
Pos	Team	W	L	MF	MA	MD	Pts
1	Indonesia	2	0	9	1	+8	2
2	South Korea	1	1	6	4	+2	1
3	England	0	2	0	10	−10	0

Indonesia	5–0	England
South Korea	5–0	England
Indonesia	4–1	South Korea

Indonesia
5
Istora Senayan
25 May 1989

England
0

			1	2	3
1	(Indonesia) (England)	Verawaty Fajrin / Yanti Kusmiati; Gillian Clark / Gillian Gowers	15; 9	15; 11
2	(Indonesia) (England)	Susi Susanti; Fiona Smith	12; 11	11; 0
3	(Indonesia) (England)	Eddy Hartono / Rudy Gunawan; Martin Dew / Steve Baddeley	15; 10	15; 5
4	(Indonesia) (England)	Icuk Sugiarto; Darren Hall	15; 12	15; 7
5	(Indonesia) (England)	Eddy Hartono / Verawaty Fajrin; Andy Goode / Gillian Gowers	15; 8	15; 6

South Korea
5
Istora Senayan
26 May 1989

England
0

			1	2	3
1	(South Korea) (England)	Sung Han-kook; Steve Butler	15; 10	15; 10
2	(South Korea) (England)	Lee Young-suk; Helen Troke	11; 8	11; 5
3	(South Korea) (England)	Park Joo-bong / Kim Moon-soo; Martin Dew / Steve Baddeley	15; 5	15; 11
4	(South Korea) (England)	/ /
5	(South Korea) (England)	Park Joo-bong / Chung Myung-hee; Andy Goode / Gillian Gowers	15; 10	15; 6

Indonesia
4
Istora Senayan
27 May 1989

South Korea
1

			1	2	3
1	(Indonesia) (South Korea)	Verawaty Fajrin / Yanti Kusmiati; Chung Myung-hee / Hwang Hye-young	15; 6	11; 15	10; 15
2	(Indonesia) (South Korea)	Susi Susanti; Lee Young-suk	3; 11	11; 7	12; 11
3	(Indonesia) (South Korea)	Eddy Hartono / Rudy Gunawan; Park Joo-bong / Lee Sang-bok	15; 12	15; 8
4	(Indonesia) (South Korea)	Icuk Sugiarto; Lee Kwang-jin	15; 11	15; 1
5	(Indonesia) (South Korea)	Aryono Miranat / Minarti Timur; Park Joo-bong / Chung Myung-hee	15; 9	15; 2

==== Subgroup B ====
Pos	Team	W	L	MF	MA	MD	Pts
1	China	2	0	9	1	+8	2
2	Denmark	1	1	3	7	−2	1
3	Sweden	0	2	3	7	−2	0

China	4–1	Sweden
China	5–0	Denmark
Denmark	3–2	Sweden

China
4
Istora Senayan
25 May 1989

Sweden
1

			1	2	3
1	(China) (Sweden)	Jiang Guoliang / Nong Qunhua; Jens Olsson / Maria Bengtsson	15; 5	16; 18	2; 15
2	(China) (Sweden)	Yang Yang; Jonas Herrgårdh	15; 5	15; 3
3	(China) (Sweden)	Han Aiping; Christine Magnusson	11; 4	11; 0
4	(China) (Sweden)	Li Yongbo / Tian Bingyi; Jan-Eric Antonsson / Pär-Gunnar Jönsson	15; 7	15; 11
5	(China) (Sweden)	Sun Xiaoqing / Zhou Lei; Catrine Bengtsson / Maria Bengtsson	16; 18	15; 6	18; 16

China
5
Istora Senayan
26 May 1989

Denmark
0

			1	2	3
1	(China) (Denmark)	Xiong Guobao; Jens Peter Nierhoff	15; 11	15; 4
2	(China) (Denmark)	Tang Jiuhong; Kirsten Larsen	11; 4	11; 0
3	(China) (Denmark)	Li Yongbo / Zheng Yumin; Mark Christiansen / Michael Kjeldsen	15; 13	15; 9
4	(China) (Denmark)	Lin Ying / Guan Weizhen; Dorte Kjær / Lotte Olsen	15; 2	15; 5
5	(China) (Denmark)	Wang Pengren / Shi Fangjing; Jesper Knudsen / Nettie Nielsen	15; 8	15; 11

Denmark
3
Istora Senayan
27 May 1989

Sweden
2

			1	2	3
1	(Denmark) (Sweden)	Dorte Kjær / Nettie Nielsen; Maria Bengtsson / Christine Magnusson	6; 15	15; 11	15; 11
2	(Denmark) (Sweden)	Morten Frost; Jonas Herrgårdh	15; 1	15; 4
3	(Denmark) (Sweden)	Mark Christiansen / Michael Kjeldsen; Jan-Eric Antonsson / Pär-Gunnar Jönsson	9; 15	15; 11	15; 9
4	(Denmark) (Sweden)	Kirsten Larsen; Christine Magnusson	10; 11	7; 11
5	(Denmark) (Sweden)	Morten Frost / Dorte Kjær; Jan-Eric Antonsson / Maria Bengtsson	8; 15	11; 15

=== Group 2 ===
Pos	Team	W	L	MF	MA	MD	Pts
1	Japan	3	0	11	4	+7	3
2	Netherlands	2	1	9	6	+3	2
3	Malaysia	1	2	8	7	+1	1
4	Soviet Union	0	3	2	13	−11	0

Japan	3–2	Malaysia
Japan	3–2	Netherlands
Japan	5–0	Soviet Union
Malaysia	1–4	Netherlands
Malaysia	5–0	Soviet Union
Netherlands	3–2	Soviet Union

=== Group 3 ===
Pos	Team	W	L	MF	MA	MD	Pts
1	Chinese Taipei	3	0	9	6	+3	3
2	Thailand	2	1	9	5	+4	2
3	Canada	1	2	8	7	+1	1
4	Hong Kong	0	3	4	11	−7	0

Chinese Taipei	3–2	Thailand
Chinese Taipei	3–2	Canada
Chinese Taipei	3–2	Hong Kong
Thailand	3–2	Canada
Thailand	4–1	Hong Kong
Canada	4–1	Hong Kong

=== Group 4 ===
Pos	Team	W	L	MF	MA	MD	Pts
1	Scotland	3	0	9	5	+4	3
2	Australia	2	1	7	8	−1	2
3	West Germany	1	2	7	8	−1	1
4	Poland	0	3	6	9	−3	0

Scotland	4–1	Australia
Scotland	3–2	West Germany
Scotland	3–2	Poland
Australia	3–2	West Germany
Australia	3–2	Poland
West Germany	3–2	Poland

=== Group 5 ===
Pos	Team	W	L	MF	MA	MD	Pts
1	New Zealand	3	0	14	1	+13	3
2	Finland	2	1	10	5	+5	2
3	United States	1	2	5	10	−5	1
4	Austria	0	3	1	14	−13	0

New Zealand	4–1	Finland
New Zealand	5–0	United States
New Zealand	5–0	Austria
Finland	5–0	United States
Finland	4–1	Austria
United States	5–0	Austria

=== Group 6 ===
Pos	Team	W	L	MF	MA	MD	Pts
1	Norway	2	0	9	1	+8	2
2	Sri Lanka	1	1	6	4	+2	1
3	Nepal	0	2	0	10	−10	0

Norway	4–1	Sri Lanka
Norway	5–0	Nepal
Sri Lanka	5–0	Nepal

=== Group 7 ===
Pos	Team	W	L	MF	MA	MD	Pts
1	Bulgaria	2	0	9	1	+8	2
2	France	1	1	6	4	+2	1
3	Mauritius	0	2	0	10	−10	0

Bulgaria	3–2	France
Bulgaria	5–0	Mauritius
France	5–0	Mauritius

== Knockout stage ==
=== Classification bracket ===
Fifth place match
Sweden	5
England	0

=== Semi-finals ===
==== Indonesia vs Denmark ====
Indonesia
5
Istora Senayan
28 May 1989

Denmark
0

			1	2	3
1	(Indonesia) (Denmark)	Eddy Hartono / Rudy Gunawan; Jan Paulsen / Henrik Svarrer	15; 2	15; 13
2	(Indonesia) (Denmark)	Verawaty Fajrin / Yanti Kusmiati; Dorte Kjær / Lotte Olsen	15; 11	15; 4
3	(Indonesia) (Denmark)	Eddy Kurniawan; Poul-Erik Høyer Larsen	15; 9	15; 10
4	(Indonesia) (Denmark)	Susi Susanti; Pernille Nedergaard	11; 6	11; 2
5	(Indonesia) (Denmark)	Eddy Hartono / Verawaty Fajrin; Jesper Knudsen / Nettie Nielsen	15; 3	15; 1

==== South Korea vs China ====
South Korea
3
Istora Senayan
28 May 1989

China
2

			1	2	3
1	(South Korea) (China)	Park Joo-bong / Chung Myung-hee; Wang Pengren / Shi Fangjing	15; 8	15; 2
2	(South Korea) (China)	Lee Young-suk; Han Aiping	12; 9	5; 11	0; 11
3	(South Korea) (China)	Ahn Jae-chang; Yang Yang	5; 15	7; 15
4	(South Korea) (China)	Chung So-young / Hwang Hye-young; Lin Ying / Guan Weizhen	15; 8	15; 12
5	(South Korea) (China)	Park Joo-bong / Kim Moon-soo; Li Yongbo / Chen Kang	15; 7	15; 11

=== Final ===
Indonesia
3
Istora Senayan
28 May 1989

South Korea
2

			1	2	3
1	(Indonesia) (South Korea)	Eddy Hartono / Rudy Gunawan; Park Joo Bong / Kim Moon-soo	9; 15	15; 8	13; 15
2	(Indonesia) (South Korea)	Verawaty Fajrin / Yanti Kusmiati; Hwang Hye-young / Chung So-young	12; 15	6; 15
3	(Indonesia) (South Korea)	Susi Susanti; Lee Young-suk	10; 12	12; 10	11; 0
4	(Indonesia) (South Korea)	Eddy Kurniawan; Sung Han-kook	15; 4	15; 3
5	(Indonesia) (South Korea)	Eddy Hartono / Verawaty Fajrin; Park Joo Bong / Chung So-young	18; 13	15; 3

1989 Sudirman Cup Champions

Indonesia
First title

== Final ranking ==
Pos	Team	Pld	W	L	Pts	Final result
1st place, gold medalist(s)	Indonesia	4	4	0	4	Champions
2nd place, silver medalist(s)	South Korea	4	2	2	2	Runner-up
3rd place, bronze medalist(s)	China	3	2	1	2	Eliminated in semi-finals
3rd place, bronze medalist(s)	Denmark	3	1	2	1	Eliminated in semi-finals
5	Sweden	3	1	2	1	Group 1
6	England	3	0	3	0	Group 1
7	Japan	3	3	0	3	Group 2
8	Netherlands	3	2	1	2	Group 2
9	Malaysia	3	1	2	1	Group 2
10	Soviet Union	3	0	3	0	Group 2
11	Chinese Taipei	3	3	0	3	Group 3
12	Thailand	3	2	1	2	Group 3
13	Canada	3	1	2	1	Group 3
14	Hong Kong	3	0	3	0	Group 3
15	Scotland	3	4	0	3	Group 4
16	Australia	3	3	1	2	Group 4
17	West Germany	3	3	1	1	Group 4
18	Poland	3	0	4	0	Group 4
19	New Zealand	3	3	0	3	Group 5
20	Finland	3	2	1	2	Group 5
21	United States	3	1	2	1	Group 5
22	Austria	3	0	3	0	Group 5
41	Norway	2	2	0	2	Group 6
42	Sri Lanka	2	1	1	1	Group 6
43	Nepal	2	0	2	0	Group 6
44	Bulgaria	2	2	0	2	Group 7
45	France	2	1	1	1	Group 7
46	Mauritius	2	0	2	0	Group 7
−	India	−	−	−	−	Withdrew
−	Pakistan	−	−	−	−	Withdrew

Promoted to higher group
Relegated to lower group
