= Badminton at the 1990 Asian Games – Mixed doubles =

Mixed doubles at the 1990 Asian Games
- Venue: Beijing Gymnasium
- Dates: 2–6 October 1990
- Competitors: 28 from 7 nations

Medalists
gold medal	Park Joo-bong; Chung Myung-hee	South Korea
silver medal	Eddy Hartono; Verawaty Fadjrin	Indonesia
bronze medal	Rudy Gunawan; Rosiana Tendean	Indonesia
bronze medal	Zheng Yumin; Shi Fangjing	China

The badminton mixed doubles tournament at the 1990 Asian Games in Beijing Sports Complex, Beijing, China took place from 2 October to 6 October.

The South Korea duo of Park Joo-bong and Chung Myung-hee won the gold in this tournament after beating an Indonesian pair in the final.

China and another team from Indonesia shared the bronze medal.

== Schedule ==
All times are China Standard Time (UTC+08:00)

Date	Time	Event
Tuesday, 2 October 1990	13:00	1st round
Thursday, 4 October 1990	13:00	Quarterfinals
Friday, 5 October 1990	13:00	Semifinals
Saturday, 6 October 1990	13:00	Final

== Results ==
1st round
Siripong Siripool (THA); Ladawan Mulasartsatorn (THA)	15	15
Tse Bun (HKG); Cheng Yin Sat (HKG)	1	3
3/4	Rudy Gunawan (INA); Rosiana Tendean (INA)	15	6	15
Wu Wenkai (CHN); Zhou Lei (CHN)	6	15	1
Shinji Matsuura (JPN); Kimiko Jinnai (JPN)	15	15
Amer Islam (PAK); Afshan Shakeel (PAK)	6	2
Zheng Yumin (CHN); Shi Fangjing (CHN)	15	15
Pramote Teerawiwatana (THA); Penpanor Klangthamnium (THA)	6	0
Sung Han-kook (KOR); Chung So-young (KOR)	15	15
3/4	Ng Pak Kum (HKG); Chui Mei Yin (HKG)	3	2
Ali Yar Baig (PAK); Ghazala Wadood (PAK)	6	3
Koji Miya (JPN); Kazue Kanai (JPN)	15	15

Quarterfinals
1	Park Joo-bong (KOR); Chung Myung-hee (KOR)	15	15
Siripong Siripool (THA); Ladawan Mulasartsatorn (THA)	7	8
3/4	Rudy Gunawan (INA); Rosiana Tendean (INA)	15	15
Shinji Matsuura (JPN); Kimiko Jinnai (JPN)	3	4
Zheng Yumin (CHN); Shi Fangjing (CHN)	15	11	15
Sung Han-kook (KOR); Chung So-young (KOR)	8	15	5
Koji Miya (JPN); Kazue Kanai (JPN)	2	6
2	Eddy Hartono (INA); Verawaty Fadjrin (INA)	15	15

Semifinals
1	Park Joo-bong (KOR); Chung Myung-hee (KOR)	15	15
3/4	Rudy Gunawan (INA); Rosiana Tendean (INA)	9	4
Zheng Yumin (CHN); Shi Fangjing (CHN)	16	12
2	Eddy Hartono (INA); Verawaty Fadjrin (INA)	18	15

Finals
1	Park Joo-bong (KOR); Chung Myung-hee (KOR)	15	7	15
2	Eddy Hartono (INA); Verawaty Fadjrin (INA)	7	15	3
