= 1988 Badminton World Cup =

Badminton championships

Tournament details
- Dates: September 1988
- Edition: 10th
- Total prize money: US$130,000
- Venue: National Stadium
- Location: Bangkok, Thailand

The 1988 Badminton World Cup was the tenth edition of an international tournament Badminton World Cup. The event was held in September 1988. China won titles in all 5 disciplines.

== Medalists ==
Event	Gold	Silver	Bronze
Men's singles	(China) Yang Yang	(China) Zhao Jianhua	(China) Xiong Guobao
Men's singles	(China) Yang Yang	(China) Zhao Jianhua	(Indonesia) Eddy Kurniawan
Women's singles	(China) Han Aiping	(China) Li Lingwei	(South Korea) Hwang Hye-young
Women's singles	(China) Han Aiping	(China) Li Lingwei	(China) Huang Hua
Men's doubles	(China) Li Yongbo (China) Tian Bingyi	(Malaysia) Jalani Sidek (Malaysia) Razif Sidek	(Indonesia) Eddy Hartono (Indonesia) Rudy Gunawan
Men's doubles	(China) Li Yongbo (China) Tian Bingyi	(Malaysia) Jalani Sidek (Malaysia) Razif Sidek	(Denmark) Jens Peter Nierhoff (Denmark) Michael Kjeldsen
Women's doubles	(China) Guan Weizhen (China) Lin Ying	(South Korea) Chung So-young (South Korea) Kim Yun-ja	(Denmark) Dorte Kjær (Denmark) Nettie Nielsen
Women's doubles	(China) Guan Weizhen (China) Lin Ying	(South Korea) Chung So-young (South Korea) Kim Yun-ja	(Indonesia) Verawaty Fajrin (Indonesia) Yanti Kusmiati
Mixed doubles	(China) Wang Pengren (China) Shi Fangjing	(South Korea) Park Joo-bong (South Korea) Chung Myung-hee	(Sweden) Jan-Eric Antonsson (Sweden) Maria Bengtsson
Mixed doubles	(China) Wang Pengren (China) Shi Fangjing	(South Korea) Park Joo-bong (South Korea) Chung Myung-hee	(England) Andy Goode (England) Gillian Gowers

== Men's singles ==
=== Finals ===
Semi-finals
(China) Yang Yang	15	15
(Indonesia) Eddy Kurniawan	13	6
(China) Xiong Guobao	9	15	9
(China) Zhao Jianhua	15	12	15

Final
(China) Yang Yang	15	15
(China) Zhao Jianhua	5	6

== Women's singles ==
=== Finals ===
Semi-finals
(China) Li Lingwei	11	11
(China) Huang Hua	7	8
(South Korea) Hwang Hye-young	11	1	1
(China) Han Aiping	4	11	11

Final
(China) Li Lingwei	11	6	0
(China) Han Aiping	5	11	11

== Men's doubles ==
=== Finals ===
Semi-finals
(China) Li Yongbo (China) Tian Bingyi	8	15	15
(Indonesia) Eddy Hartono (Indonesia) Rudy Gunawan	15	5	11
(Denmark) Jens Peter Nierhoff (Denmark) Michael Kjeldsen	6	7
(Malaysia) Jalani Sidek (Malaysia) Razif Sidek	15	15

Final
(China) Li Yongbo (China) Tian Bingyi
(Malaysia) Jalani Sidek (Malaysia) Razif Sidek	w	/	o

== Women's doubles ==
=== Finals ===
Semi-finals
(China) Guan Weizhen (China) Lin Ying	12	15	15
(Denmark) Dorte Kjær (Denmark) Nettie Nielsen	15	1	5
(Indonesia) Verawaty Fajrin (Indonesia) Yanti Kusmiati	15	8	5
(South Korea) Chung So-young (South Korea) Kim Yun-ja	9	15	15

Final
(China) Guan Weizhen (China) Lin Ying	15	15
(South Korea) Chung So-young (South Korea) Kim Yun-ja	3	7

== Mixed doubles ==
=== Finals ===
Semi-finals
(China) Wang Pengren (China) Shi Fangjing	15	15
(England) Andy Goode (England) Gillian Gowers	6	12
(Sweden) Jan-Eric Antonsson (Sweden) Maria Bengtsson	6	12
(South Korea) Park Joo-bong (South Korea) Chung Myung-hee	15	15

Final
(China) Wang Pengren (China) Shi Fangjing	15	18	15
(South Korea) Park Joo-bong (South Korea) Chung Myung-hee	17	13	8
