= Lee Deuk-choon =

South Korean badminton player (born 1962)

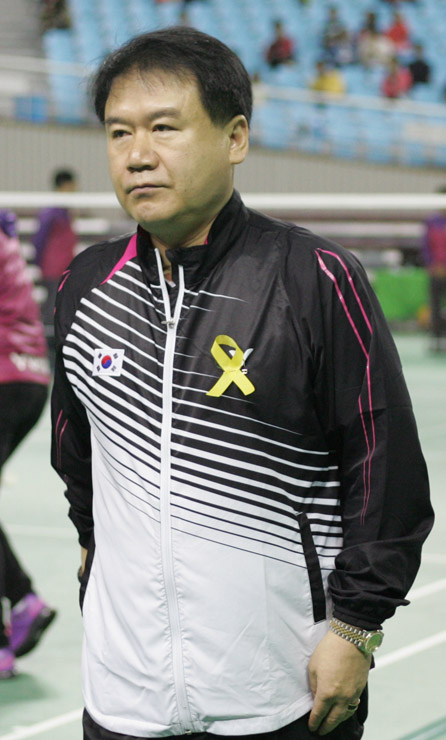
- Lee Deuk-choon at the 2014 Asian Championships in Gimcheon

Personal information
- Born: 16 July 1962 (age 64)

Sport
- Country: South Korea
- Sport: Badminton
Medal record
Men's badminton
Representing South Korea
World Championships
Silver medal – second place	1987 Beijing	Mixed doubles
World Cup
Bronze medal – third place	1987 Kuala Lumpur	Mixed doubles
Asian Games
Gold medal – first place	1986 Seoul	Men's team
Silver medal – second place	1986 Seoul	Mixed doubles
Bronze medal – third place	1982 New Delhi	Men's team
Asian Championships
Bronze medal – third place	1987 Semarang	Men's team

Lee Deuk-choon (Korean: 이득춘, born 16 July 1962) is a retired male badminton player from South Korea. In 2013, he became head coach of the Korean National Badminton Team after nearly 20 years as the head coach of the Junior National Team. He replaced Kim Joong-soo, who was the acting head coach following the removal of Sung Han-kook. Lee was replaced as head coach on 1 January 2017 by Kang Kyung-jin.

== Career ==
He won a silver medal at the 1987 IBF World Championships in mixed doubles with Chung Myung-hee and the same year, he and Chung won the mixed title at the All England Open Badminton Championships.

== Achievements ==
=== World Championships ===
Mixed doubles
Year	Venue	Partner	Opponent	Score	Result
1987	Capital Indoor Stadium, Beijing, China	(South Korea) Chung Myung-hee	(China) Wang Pengren (China) Shi Fangjing	6–15, 15–12, 10–15	Silver

=== World Cup ===
Mixed doubles
Year	Venue	Partner	Opponent	Score	Result
1987	Stadium Negara, Kuala Lumpur, Malaysia	(South Korea) Chung Myung-hee	(Denmark) Steen Fladberg (England) Gillian Clark	8–15, 9–15	Bronze

=== Asian Games ===
Mixed doubles
Year	Venue	Partner	Opponent	Score	Result
1986	Olympic Gymnastics Arena, Seoul, South Korea	(South Korea) Chung So-young	(South Korea) Park Joo-bong (South Korea) Chung Myung-hee	10–15, 3–15	Silver

=== IBF World Grand Prix ===
The World Badminton Grand Prix sanctioned by International Badminton Federation (IBF) from 1983 to 2006.

Men's doubles
Year	Tournament	Partner	Opponent	Score	Result
1984	Malaysia Open	(South Korea) Kim Moon-soo	(Malaysia) Razif Sidek (Malaysia) Jalani Sidek	15–6, 12–15, 15–10	(gold) Winner
1986	Chinese Taipei Open	(South Korea) Kim Joong-soo	(Malaysia) Razif Sidek (Malaysia) Jalani Sidek	4–15, 5–15	(silver) Runner-up
1987	Japan Open	(South Korea) Shon Jin-hwan	(Indonesia) Liem Swie King (Indonesia) Eddy Hartono	4–15, 7–15	(silver) Runner-up
1987	French Open	(South Korea) Kim Moon-soo	(Indonesia) Hadibowo Susanto (Indonesia) Rudy Heryanto	15–0, 17–14	(gold) Winner
1987	Canada Open	(South Korea) Lee Sang-bok	(Indonesia) Lius Pongoh (Indonesia) Richard Mainaky	11–15, 15–8, 15–13	(gold) Winner

Mixed doubles
Year	Tournament	Partner	Opponent	Score	Result
1985	Swedish Open	(South Korea) Chung Myung-hee	(Sweden) Stefan Karlsson (Sweden) Maria Bengtsson	5–15, 15–11, 7–15	(silver) Runner-Up
1986	German Open	(South Korea) Chung Myung-hee	(England) Martin Dew (England) Gillian Gilks	10–15, 18–17, 15–10	(gold) Winner
1986	Scandinavian Open	(South Korea) Chung Myung-hee	(England) Martin Dew (England) Gillian Gilks	16–17, 15–12, 7–15	(silver) Runner-Up
1986	All England Open	(South Korea) Chung So-young	(South Korea) Park Joo-bong (South Korea) Chung Myung-hee	5–15, 5–15	(silver) Runner-Up
1987	Japan Open	(South Korea) Chung Myung-hee	(Scotland) Billy Gilliland (England) Gillian Gowers	15–2, 15–5	(gold) Winner
1987	All England Open	(South Korea) Chung Myung-hee	(Sweden) Jan-Eric Antonsson (Sweden) Christine Magnusson	15–5, 14–18, 15–8	(gold) Winner
1987	Canada Open	(South Korea) Chung So-young	(England) Andy Goode (England) Gillian Gowers	15–3, 11–15, 5–15	(silver) Runner-up
1988	Japan Open	(South Korea) Chung So-young	(South Korea) Park Joo-bong (South Korea) Chung Myung-hee	Walkover	(silver) Runner-up

=== IBF International ===
Men's doubles
Year	Tournament	Partner	Opponent	Score	Result
1987	U.S. Open	(South Korea) Lee Sang-bok	(Chinese Taipei) Ko Hsin-Ming (Chinese Taipei) Liao Wei-Chieh	15–2, 15–1	(gold) Winner

Mixed doubles
Year	Tournament	Partner	Opponent	Score	Result
1987	U.S. Open	(South Korea) Chung So-young	(Canada) Mike Butler (Canada) Claire Backhouse	15–12, 15–6	(gold) Winner
