= Jesper Knudsen (badminton) =

Danish badminton player (born 1960)

Personal information
- Born: 22 November 1960 (age 65)

Sport
- Country: Denmark
- Sport: Badminton
- Handedness: Right
- Event: Doubles

Doubles
- BWF profile
Medal record
Men's badminton
Representing Denmark
Sudirman Cup
Bronze medal – third place	1989 Jakarta	Mixed team
European Championships
Gold medal – first place	1988 Kristiansand	Mixed team
Gold medal – first place	1990 Moscow	Mixed team
Bronze medal – third place	1990 Moscow	Mixed doubles
European Junior Championships
Gold medal – first place	1979 Mülheim	Mixed team
Bronze medal – third place	1979 Mülheim	Boys' doubles

Jesper Knudsen (born 22 November 1960) is a former Danish badminton player from Skovshoved club. Jesper is a two-time former Nordic champion, winner of gold medals twice in European mixed team championships alongside winning individual bronze himself in mixed doubles and champion in several tournaments of World Grand Prix. His most notable achievements include runner-up performance in 1988 All England Open.

== Achievements ==
=== European Championships ===
Mixed doubles
Year	Venue	Partner	Opponent	Score	Result
1990	Minor Arena of the Central Lenin Stadium; Moscow, Soviet Union	(Denmark) Lotte Olsen	(Sweden) Jan-Eric Antonsson (Sweden) Maria Bengtsson	13–18, 5–15	Bronze

=== European Junior Championships ===
Boys' doubles
Year	Venue	Partner	Opponent	Score	Result
1979	Carl Diem Halle; Mülheim an der Ruhr, West Germany	(Denmark) Torben Kjær	(West Germany) Harald Klauer (West Germany) Gerhard Treitinger	4–15, 9–15	Bronze

=== IBF World Grand Prix ===
The World Badminton Grand Prix sanctioned by International Badminton Federation (IBF) from 1983 to 2006.

Men's doubles
Year	Tournament	Partner	Opponent	Score	Result
1986	Scottish Open	(Denmark) Henrik Svarrer	(Scotland) Billy Gilliland (Scotland) Dan Travers	15–10, 15–10	(gold) Winner
1987	Carlton Intersport Cup	(Denmark) Henrik Svarrer	(Denmark) Mark Christiansen (Sweden) Stefan Karlsson	6–15, 10–15	(silver) Runner-up
1990	Denmark Open	(Denmark) Thomas Stuer-Lauridsen	(China) Tian Bingyi (China) Li Yongbo	8–15, 6–15	(silver) Runner-up

Mixed doubles
Year	Tournament	Partner	Opponent	Score	Result
1986	Scottish Open	(Denmark) Nettie Nielsen	(England) Andy Goode (England) Fiona Elliott	15–9, 3–15, 8–15	(silver) Runner-up
1986	Denmark Open	(Denmark) Nettie Nielsen	(England) Martin Dew (England) Gillian Gilks	10–15, 11–15	(silver) Runner-up
1988	Dutch Open	(Denmark) Nettie Nielsen	(Denmark) Henrik Svarrer (Denmark) Dorte Kjær	15–7, 15–11	(gold) Winner
1988	England Open	(Denmark) Nettie Nielsen	(China) Wang Pengren (China) Shi Fangjing	9–15, 13–18	(silver) Runner-up
1988	Denmark Open	(Denmark) Nettie Nielsen	(Indonesia) Rudy Gunawan (Indonesia) Lilik Sudarwati	15–7, 15–4	(gold) Winner
1989	Denmark Open	(Denmark) Nettie Nielsen	(Sweden) Pär-Gunnar Jönsson (Sweden) Maria Bengtsson	15–6, 15–6	(gold) Winner
1989	Poona Open	(Denmark) Steen Fladberg	(China) Zhou Jincan (China) Zhang Qiang	10–15, 6–15	(silver) Runner-up

=== IBF International ===
Mixed doubles
Year	Tournament	Partner	Opponent	Score	Result
1985	Welsh International	(Denmark) Nettie Nielsen	(Denmark) Kim Brodersen (Denmark) Hanne Adsbøl	15–6, 15–12	(gold) Winner
1987	Nordic Championships	(Denmark) Nettie Nielsen	(Denmark) Peter Buch (Denmark) Grete Mogensen	15–5, 15–6	(gold) Winner
1987	English Masters	(Denmark) Nettie Nielsen	(England) Richard Outterside (England) Karen Chapman	14–18, 15–9, 15–9	(gold) Winner
1988	Nordic Championships	(Denmark) Nettie Nielsen	(Sweden) Jan-Eric Antonsson (Sweden) Maria Bengtsson	15–11, 16–17, 15–10	(gold) Winner
1988	English Masters	(Denmark) Nettie Nielsen	(Denmark) Steen Fladberg (England) Gillian Clark	15–11, 15–6	(gold) Winner
