= Yanti Kusmiati =

Indonesian badminton player (born 1962)

Personal information
- Born: 22 December 1962 (age 63) Bogor, West Java, Indonesia

Sport
- Country: Indonesia
- Sport: Badminton
- Event: Women's doubles
Medal record
Women's badminton
Representing Indonesia
World Cup
Bronze medal – third place	1986 Jakarta	Mixed doubles
Bronze medal – third place	1988 Bangkok	Women's doubles
Bronze medal – third place	1989 Guangzhou	Women's doubles
Sudirman Cup
Gold medal – first place	1989 Jakarta	Mixed team
Uber Cup
Silver medal – second place	1986 Jakarta	Women's team
Bronze medal – third place	1988 Kuala Lumpur	Women's team
Bronze medal – third place	1990 Tokyo	Women's team
Southeast Asian Games
Gold medal – first place	1989 Kuala Lumpur	Women's team
Silver medal – second place	1989 Kuala Lumpur	Women's doubles

Yanti Kusmiati (born 22 December 1962) is a former Indonesian badminton player who was active during the 1980s.

== Career ==
Kusmiati was born in Bogor, West Java. She is the daughter of Esther Tunjung Wulan, Indonesian former badminton player, coach and international referee. She graduated from Ragunan Sports School and joined Prasetya Mulya (PSM) Jakarta.

Kusmiati is a former Indonesian badminton player who specializes in women's doubles paired with Verawaty Fajrin. She and her teammates won the first edition of the World Mixed Team Championship, the 1989 Sudirman Cup in Jakarta and became a member of the Indonesian women's team at the World Women's Team Championship, the Uber Cup in 1986, 1988, and 1990. In the 1986 Uber Cup the Indonesian team won second place. Kusmiati also won the women's doubles at the 1988 Asian Invitational Championships with Verawaty Fadjrin and the Indonesian Open in 1988.

Kusmiati used to be a mixed doubles assistant coach at the Indonesia national team.

== Achievements ==
=== World Cup ===
Women's doubles
Year	Venue	Partner	Opponent	Score	Result
1988	Indoor Stadium Huamark, Bangkok, Thailand	(Indonesia) Verawaty Fadjrin	(South Korea) Chung So-young (South Korea) Kim Yun-ja	15–9, 8–15, 5–15	Bronze
1989	Guangzhou Gymnasium, Guangzhou, China	(Indonesia) Verawaty Fadjrin	(South Korea) Chung So-young (South Korea) Hwang Hye-young	11–15, 6–15	Bronze

Mixed doubles
Year	Venue	Partner	Opponent	Score	Result
1986	Istora Senayan, Jakarta, Indonesia	(Indonesia) Hafid Yusuf	(Indonesia) Eddy Hartono (Indonesia) Verawaty Fadjrin	6–15, 2–15	Bronze

=== Southeast Asian Games ===
Women's doubles
Year	Venue	Partner	Opponent	Score	Result
1989	Stadium Negara, Kuala Lumpur, Malaysia	(Indonesia) Verawaty Fadjrin	(Indonesia) Erma Sulistianingsih (Indonesia) Rosiana Tendean	6–15, 6–15	Silver

=== IBF World Grand Prix ===
The World Badminton Grand Prix was sanctioned by the International Badminton Federation from 1983 to 2006.

Women's doubles
Year	Tournament	Partner	Opponent	Score	Result
1988	Indonesia Open	(Indonesia) Verawaty Fadjrin	(South Korea) Chung Myung-hee (South Korea) Hwang Hye-young	15–6, 6–15, 15–8	(gold) Winner

IBF Grand Prix tournament
IBF Grand Prix Finals tournament

=== Invitational Tournament ===
Women's doubles
Year	Tournament	Partner	Opponent	Score	Result
1988	Asian Invitational Championships; Bandar Lampung, Indonesia	(Indonesia) Verawaty Fadjrin	(South Korea) Chung Myung-hee (South Korea) Hwang Hye-young	18–16, 18–14	Gold
