= Nick Yates (badminton) =

English badminton player

Personal information
- Born: Lee, London, England

Sport
- Country: England
- Sport: Badminton
Medal record
Men's badminton
Representing England
Thomas Cup
Bronze medal – third place	1982 London	Men's team
Commonwealth Games
Gold medal – first place	1982 Brisbane	Mixed team
Silver medal – second place	1982 Brisbane	Men's singles
Silver medal – second place	1982 Brisbane	Men's doubles
Gold medal – first place	1986 Edinburgh	Mixed team
Bronze medal – third place	1986 Edinburgh	Men's singles
European Championships
Gold medal – first place	1982 Böblingen	Mixed team
Bronze medal – third place	1982 Böblingen	Men's singles
European Junior Championships
Silver medal – second place	1979 Mülheim	Boys' singles
Silver medal – second place	1979 Mülheim	Mixed team
Bronze medal – third place	1979 Mülheim	Boys' doubles

Nick Yates is an English badminton player.

== Badminton career ==
Yates represented England and won a gold medal in the team event and two silver medals in the singles and doubles, at the 1982 Commonwealth Games in Brisbane, Queensland, Australia.

Four years later he represented England again and won another gold medal in the team event in addition to a bronze medal in the singles, at the 1986 Commonwealth Games in Edinburgh, Scotland.

== Achievements ==
=== IBF World Grand Prix ===
The World Badminton Grand Prix sanctioned by International Badminton Federation (IBF) from 1983 to 2006.

Men's singles
Year	Tournament	Opponent	Score	Result
1985	German Open	(Denmark) Torben Carlsen	18–16, 15–0	(gold) Winner
1987	Carlton-Intersport-Cup	(Australia) Sze Yu	15–11, 6–15, 10–15	(silver) Runner-up
1988	Japan Open	(China) Zhang Qingwu	18–13, 9–15, 15–5	(gold) Winner
1988	Scottish Open	(Denmark) Morten Frost	7–15, 5–15	(silver) Runner-up

Men's doubles
Year	Tournament	Partner	Opponent	Score	Result
1985	India Open	(England) Steve Baddeley	(South Korea) Park Joo-bong (South Korea) Kim Moon-soo	3–15, 5–15	(silver) Runner-up
