= Tim He =

Hong Kong badminton player (born 1962)

Tim He 何一鳴
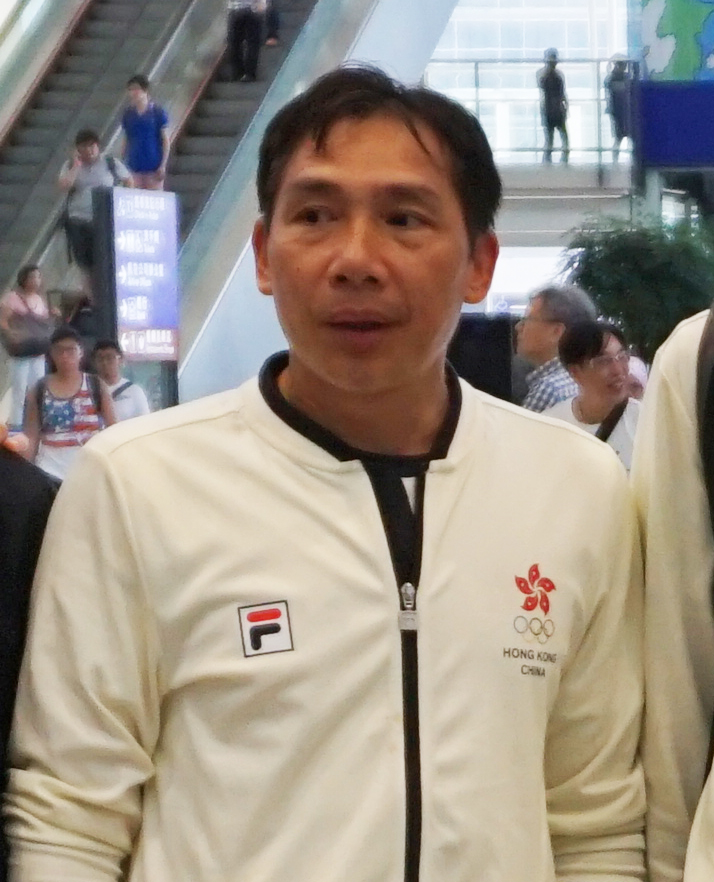
- Tim He in 2016

Personal information
- Full name: Tim He Yi-ming
- Country: Hong Kong
- Born: 14 April 1962 (age 62)
- Handedness: Right
Medal record
Men's badminton
Representing China
World Championships
Bronze medal – third place	1987 Beijing	Mixed doubles
- BWF profile

Tim He Yi-ming (born 14 April 1962) is a Chinese former badminton player who later started to represent Hong Kong. He competed in two events at the 1996 Summer Olympics.
