= 1987 IBF World Championships =

Tournament details
- Dates: 18 May – 24 May
- Edition: 5th
- Level: International
- Venue: Capital Indoor Stadium
- Location: Beijing, China

The 1987 IBF World Championships (World Badminton Championships) were held in Beijing, China, in 1987.

== Venue ==
- Capitol Sports Hall

== Medalists ==
=== Medal table ===
* Host nation (China)

Rank	Nation	Gold	Silver	Bronze	Total
1	China*	5	2	4	11
2	South Korea	0	1	3	4
3	Denmark	0	1	1	2
4	Malaysia	0	1	0	1
5	England	0	0	1	1
5	Indonesia	0	0	1	1
Totals (6 entries)		5	5	10	20

=== Medalists ===
Event	Gold	Silver	Bronze
Men's singles	(China) Yang Yang	(Denmark) Morten Frost	(China) Zhao Jianhua
Men's singles	(China) Yang Yang	(Denmark) Morten Frost	(Indonesia) Icuk Sugiarto
Women's singles	(China) Han Aiping	(China) Li Lingwei	(China) Zheng Yuli
Women's singles	(China) Han Aiping	(China) Li Lingwei	(China) Gu Jiaming
Men's doubles	(China) Li Yongbo (China) Tian Bingyi	(Malaysia) Jalani Sidek (Malaysia) Razif Sidek	(Denmark) Jens Peter Nierhoff (Denmark) Michael Kjeldsen
Men's doubles	(China) Li Yongbo (China) Tian Bingyi	(Malaysia) Jalani Sidek (Malaysia) Razif Sidek	(South Korea) Park Joo-bong (South Korea) Kim Moon-soo
Women's doubles	(China) Lin Ying (China) Guan Weizhen	(China) Li Lingwei (China) Han Aiping	(South Korea) Kim Yun-ja (South Korea) Chung So-young
Women's doubles	(China) Lin Ying (China) Guan Weizhen	(China) Li Lingwei (China) Han Aiping	(South Korea) Chung Myung-hee (South Korea) Hwang Hye-young
Mixed doubles	(China) Wang Pengren (China) Shi Fangjing	(South Korea) Lee Deuk-choon (South Korea) Chung Myung-hee	(England) Martin Dew (England) Gillian Gilks
Mixed doubles	(China) Wang Pengren (China) Shi Fangjing	(South Korea) Lee Deuk-choon (South Korea) Chung Myung-hee	(China) He Yiming (China) Yang Xinfang
