= Park Joo-bong =

South Korean badminton player (born 1964)

Personal information
- Born: 5 December 1964 (age 61) Imsil, North Jeolla Province, South Korea
- Height: 1.82 m (6 ft 0 in)

Sport
- Country: South Korea
- Sport: Badminton
- Handedness: Right

Men's & mixed doubles
- Highest ranking: 1 (MD with Kim Moon-soo & with Ra Kyung-min)
- BWF profile
Medal record
Men's badminton
Representing South Korea
Olympic Games
Gold medal – first place	1992 Barcelona	Men's doubles
Silver medal – second place	1996 Atlanta	Mixed doubles
World Championships
Gold medal – first place	1985 Calgary	Men's doubles
Gold medal – first place	1985 Calgary	Mixed doubles
Gold medal – first place	1989 Jakarta	Mixed doubles
Gold medal – first place	1991 Copenhagen	Men's doubles
Gold medal – first place	1991 Copenhagen	Mixed doubles
Bronze medal – third place	1983 Copenhagen	Men's doubles
Bronze medal – third place	1987 Beijing	Men's doubles
World Cup
Gold medal – first place	1989 Guangzhou	Men's doubles
Gold medal – first place	1989 Guangzhou	Mixed doubles
Gold medal – first place	1987 Kuala Lumpur	Men's doubles
Gold medal – first place	1983 Kuala Lumpur	Men's doubles
Silver medal – second place	1991 Macau	Men's doubles
Silver medal – second place	1988 Jakarta	Mixed doubles
Bronze medal – third place	1986 Jakarta	Men's doubles
Sudirman Cup
Gold medal – first place	1991 Copenhagen	Mixed team
Gold medal – first place	1993 Birmingham	Mixed team
Silver medal – second place	1989 Jakarta	Mixed team
Thomas Cup
Bronze medal – third place	1992 Kuala Lumpur	Men's team
Bronze medal – third place	1996 Hong Kong	Men's team
Asian Games
Gold medal – first place	1986 Seoul	Men's doubles
Gold medal – first place	1986 Seoul	Mixed doubles
Gold medal – first place	1986 Seoul	Men's team
Gold medal – first place	1990 Beijing	Mixed doubles
Silver medal – second place	1990 Beijing	Men's doubles
Bronze medal – third place	1982 New Delhi	Men's doubles
Bronze medal – third place	1982 New Delhi	Men's team
Bronze medal – third place	1990 Beijing	Men's team
Asian Championships
Gold medal – first place	1983 Calcutta	Mixed doubles
Gold medal – first place	1985 Kuala Lumpur	Men's doubles
Gold medal – first place	1991 Kuala Lumpur	Mixed doubles
Gold medal – first place	1991 Kuala Lumpur	Men's doubles
Bronze medal – third place	1983 Calcutta	Men's singles
Bronze medal – third place	1987 Semarang	Men's team
Bronze medal – third place	1989 Shanghai	Men's team
Asian Cup
Gold medal – first place	1996 Seoul	Mixed doubles

- Park Joo-bong
- Hangul: 박주봉
- Hanja: 朴柱奉
- RR: Bak Jubong
- MR: Pak Chubong

Park Joo-bong (Korean: 박주봉; Hanja: 朴柱奉; born 5 December 1964) is a South Korean former badminton player who excelled from the early 1980s through the mid-1990s. He was a member of South Korean national team from 1981 to 1996. In the first year that badminton was an official medal sport Park won a gold medal in men's doubles at the 1992 Olympics in Barcelona, and in 1996 won a silver medal in mixed doubles at the 1996 Olympics in Atlanta. He was a two-time World men's doubles champion and a three-time World mixed doubles champion.

== Career ==
Park began his badminton career at the age of 11 encouraged by his father, Park Myung-soo. He was selected to join the South Korean national team in 1981.

Park is one of the most successful players ever in the World Badminton Championships with 5 titles, 2 of them in men's doubles and 3 in mixed doubles. He also won a gold and a silver medal at the Summer Olympics and 9 All England Open Badminton Championships titles. Inspired by his idol Christian Hadinata, though Park was primarily a doubles player, the greatest one ever in the opinion of some, he was capable of world class level singles which he displayed in occasional tournaments and Thomas Cup appearances early in his career and currently holds the South Korean national record of 103 consecutive wins in men's singles from 1981 to 1984. His playing strengths included remarkable reflexes, reach, quickness, agility, and power.

Park competed for Korea in badminton at the 1992 Summer Olympics in men's doubles with partner Kim Moon-Soo. They won the gold medal defeating Eddy Hartono and Rudy Gunawan from Indonesia 15–11, 15–7. Park also competed for Korea in badminton at the 1996 Summer Olympics in mixed doubles with partner Ra Kyung-min. They won the silver medal, losing in the final against Kim Dong-moon and Gil Young-ah 13–15, 15–4, 15–12.

Park was the first Korean player to be inducted into the Badminton Hall of Fame in 2001.

== Personal life ==
Park is married to Lee Soo-jin and had a son. Besides being able to speak his mother tongue, he can also speak English and Japanese.

== Achievements ==
=== Olympic Games ===
Men's doubles
Year	Venue	Partner	Opponent	Score	Result
1992	Pavelló de la Mar Bella; Barcelona, Spain	(South Korea) Kim Moon-soo	(Indonesia) Rudy Gunawan (Indonesia) Eddy Hartono	15–11, 15–7	Gold

Mixed doubles
Year	Venue	Partner	Opponent	Score	Result
1988 (exhibition)	Seoul National University Gymnasium; Seoul, South Korea	(South Korea) Chung Myung-hee	(China) Wang Pengren (China) Shi Fangjing	15–3, 15–7	Gold
1996	Georgia State University Gymnasium; Atlanta, United States	(South Korea) Ra Kyung-min	(South Korea) Kim Dong-moon (South Korea) Gil Young-ah	15–13, 4–15, 12–15	Silver

=== World Championships ===
Men's doubles
Year	Venue	Partner	Opponent	Score	Result
1983	Brøndby Arena, Copenhagen, Denmark	(South Korea) Lee Eun-ku	(England) Martin Dew (England) Mike Tredgett	8–15, 15–2, 4–15	Bronze
1985	Olympic Saddledome, Calgary, Canada	(South Korea) Kim Moon-soo	(China) Li Yongbo (China) Tian Bingyi	5–15, 15–7, 15–9	Gold
1987	Capital Indoor Stadium, Beijing, China	(South Korea) Kim Moon-soo	(Malaysia) Jalani Sidek (Malaysia) Razif Sidek	16–17, 4–15	Bronze
1991	Brøndby Arena, Copenhagen, Denmark	(South Korea) Kim Moon-soo	(Denmark) Jon Holst-Christensen (Denmark) Thomas Lund	15–4, 15–6	Gold

Mixed doubles
Year	Venue	Partner	Opponent	Score	Result
1985	Olympic Saddledome, Calgary, Canada	(South Korea) Yoo Sang-hee	(Sweden) Stefan Karlsson (Sweden) Maria Bengtsson	15–10, 12–15, 15–12	Gold
1989	Senayan Sports Complex, Jakarta, Indonesia	(South Korea) Chung Myung-hee	(Indonesia) Eddy Hartono (Indonesia) Verawaty Fadjrin	15–9, 15–9	Gold
1991	Brøndby Arena, Copenhagen, Denmark	(South Korea) Chung Myung-hee	(Denmark) Thomas Lund (Denmark) Pernille Dupont	15–5, 15–17, 15–9	Gold

=== World Cup ===
Men's doubles
Year	Venue	Partner	Opponent	Score	Result
1983	Stadium Negara, Kuala Lumpur, Malaysia	(South Korea) Kim Moon-soo	(Indonesia) Bobby Ertanto (Indonesia) Christian Hadinata	15–6, 15–11	Gold
1986	Senayan Sports Complex, Jakarta, Indonesia	(South Korea) Kim Moon-soo	(Indonesia) Bobby Ertanto (Indonesia) Liem Swie King	11–15, 8–15	Bronze
1987	Stadium Negara, Kuala Lumpur, Malaysia	(South Korea) Kim Moon-soo	(China) Li Yongbo (China) Tian Bingyi	15–6, 6–15, 15–11	Gold
1989	Guangzhou Gymnasium, Guangzhou, China	(South Korea) Kim Moon-soo	(China) Li Yongbo (China) Tian Bingyi	15–10, 15–11	Gold
1991	Macau Forum, Macau	(South Korea) Kim Moon-soo	(Malaysia) Jalani Sidek (Malaysia) Razif Sidek	18–15, 11–15, 2–15	Silver

Mixed doubles
Year	Venue	Partner	Opponent	Score	Result
1988	National Stadium, Bangkok, Thailand	(South Korea) Chung Myung-hee	(China) Wang Pengren (China) Shi Fangjing	17–15, 13–18, 8–15	Silver
1989	Guangzhou Gymnasium, Guangzhou, China	(South Korea) Chung Myung-hee	(South Korea) Kim Moon-soo (South Korea) Chung So-young	15–5, 15–9	Gold

=== Asian Games ===
Men's doubles
Year	Venue	Partner	Opponent	Score	Result
1982	Indraprastha Indoor Stadium; New Delhi, India	(South Korea) Lee Eun-ku	(China) Lin Jiangli (China) Luan Jin	3–15, 15–10, 16–17	Bronze
1986	Olympic Gymnastics Arena, Seoul, South Korea	(South Korea) Kim Moon-soo	(China) Li Yongbo (China) Tian Bingyi	15–8, 15–10	Gold
1990	Beijing Gymnasium, Beijing, China	(South Korea) Kim Moon-soo	(China) Li Yongbo (China) Tian Bingyi	8–15, 4–15	Silver

Mixed doubles
Year	Venue	Partner	Opponent	Score	Result
1986	Olympic Gymnastics Arena, Seoul, South Korea	(South Korea) Chung Myung-hee	(South Korea) Lee Deuk-choon (South Korea) Chung So-young	15–10, 15–3	Gold
1990	Beijing Gymnasium, Beijing, China	(South Korea) Chung Myung-hee	(Indonesia) Eddy Hartono (Indonesia) Verawaty Fadjrin	15–7, 7–15, 15–3	Gold

=== Asian Championships ===
Men's singles
Year	Venue	Opponent	Score	Result
1983	Netaji Indoor Stadium, Calcutta, India	(China) Chen Changjie	9–15, 7–15	Bronze

Men's doubles
Year	Venue	Partner	Opponent	Score	Result
1985	Stadium Negara, Kuala Lumpur, Malaysia	(South Korea) Kim Moon-soo	(Malaysia) Jalani Sidek (Malaysia) Razif Sidek	15–5, 8–15, 15–2	Gold
1991	Cheras Indoor Stadium, Kuala Lumpur, Malaysia	(South Korea) Kim Moon-soo	(China) Chen Hongyong (China) Chen Kang	15–12, 15–10	Gold

Mixed doubles
Year	Venue	Partner	Opponent	Score	Result
1983	Netaji Indoor Stadium, Calcutta, India	(South Korea) Kim Yun-ja	(Indonesia) Hafid Yusuf (Indonesia) Ruth Damayanti	15–3, 15–2	Gold
1991	Cheras Indoor Stadium, Kuala Lumpur, Malaysia	(South Korea) Chung Myung-hee	(South Korea) Lee Sang-bok (South Korea) Chung So-young	15–7, 15–4	Gold

=== Asian Cup ===
Mixed doubles
Year	Venue	Partner	Opponent	Score	Result
1996	Olympic Gymnasium No. 2, Seoul, South Korea	(South Korea) Ra Kyung-min	(South Korea) Kang Kyung-jin (South Korea) Kim Mee-hyang	15–6, 15–8	Gold

=== IBF World Grand Prix (47 titles, 9 runners-up) ===
The World Badminton Grand Prix sanctioned by International Badminton Federation (IBF) from 1983 to 2006.

Men's singles
Year	Tournament	Opponent	Score	Result
1985	India Open	(England) Steve Baddeley	17–18, 2–15	(silver) Runner-up
1987	Chinese Taipei Open	(Malaysia) Misbun Sidek	15–5, 9–15, 3–15	(silver) Runner-up

Men's doubles
Year	Tournament	Partner	Opponent	Score	Result
1983	Malaysia Open	(South Korea) Sung Han-kuk	(Indonesia) Bobby Ertanto (Indonesia) Christian Hadinata	10–15, 5–15	(silver) Runner-up
1984	Swedish Open	(South Korea) Kim Moon-soo	(Sweden) Stefan Karlsson (Sweden) Thomas Kihlström	15–8, 10–15, 15–8	(gold) Winner
1985	Japan Open	(South Korea) Kim Moon-soo	(Indonesia) Hadibowo (Indonesia) Christian Hadinata	17–16, 15–2	(gold) Winner
1985	All England Open	(South Korea) Kim Moon-soo	(Denmark) Mark Christiansen (Denmark) Michael Kjeldsen	7–15, 15–10, 15–9	(gold) Winner
1985	India Open	(South Korea) Kim Moon-soo	(England) Steve Baddeley (England) Nick Yates	15–3, 15–5	(gold) Winner
1986	German Open	(South Korea) Kim Moon-soo	(Denmark) Steen Fladberg (Denmark) Jesper Helledie	15–8, 15–12	(gold) Winner
1986	All England Open	(South Korea) Kim Moon-soo	(Malaysia) Jalani Sidek (Malaysia) Razif Sidek	15–2, 15–11	(gold) Winner
1988	Japan Open	(South Korea) Kim Moon-soo	(China) Li Yongbo (China) Tian Bingyi	15–18, 4–15	(silver) Runner-up
1988	French Open	(South Korea) Sung Han-kuk	(Malaysia) Jalani Sidek (Malaysia) Razif Sidek	15–8, 12–15, 15–12	(gold) Winner
1989	Japan Open	(South Korea) Lee Sang-bok	(Sweden) Jan-Eric Antonsson (Sweden) Pär-Gunnar Jönsson	15–6, 15–5	(gold) Winner
1989	Swedish Open	(South Korea) Lee Sang-bok	(China) Li Yongbo (China) Tian Bingyi	14–17, 12–15	(silver) Runner-up
1989	All England Open	(South Korea) Lee Sang-bok	(Indonesia) Rudy Gunawan (Indonesia) Eddy Hartono	15–8, 15–7	(gold) Winner
1989	Malaysia Open	(South Korea) Kim Moon-soo	(Malaysia) Jalani Sidek (Malaysia) Razif Sidek	15–12, 10–15, 15–7	(gold) Winner
1989	Thailand Open	(South Korea) Kim Moon-soo	(Malaysia) Cheah Soon Kit (Malaysia) Razif Sidek	15–11, 15–3	(gold) Winner
1990	Japan Open	(South Korea) Kim Moon-soo	(China) Li Yongbo (China) Tian Bingyi	3–15, 17–16, 18–13	(gold) Winner
1990	All England Open	(South Korea) Kim Moon-soo	(China) Li Yongbo (China) Tian Bingyi	17–14, 15–9	(gold) Winner
1990	French Open	(South Korea) Kim Moon-soo	(Malaysia) Jalani Sidek (Malaysia) Razif Sidek	15–3, 15–10	(gold) Winner
1990	Thailand Open	(South Korea) Kim Moon-soo	(China) Chen Hongyong (China) Chen Kang	15–7, 15–7	(gold) Winner
1990	Malaysia Open	(South Korea) Kim Moon-soo	(Malaysia) Jalani Sidek (Malaysia) Razif Sidek	15–4, 13–15, 15–4	(gold) Winner
1991	Japan Open	(South Korea) Kim Moon-soo	(Malaysia) Jalani Sidek (Malaysia) Razif Sidek	15–4, retired	(gold) Winner
1991	Korea Open	(South Korea) Kim Moon-soo	(China) Li Yongbo (China) Tian Bingyi	15–3, 13–15, 15–9	(gold) Winner
1991	All England Open	(South Korea) Kim Moon-soo	(China) Li Yongbo (China) Tian Bingyi	15–12, 7–15, 8–15	(silver) Runner-up
1991	Malaysia Open	(South Korea) Kim Moon-soo	(Malaysia) Jalani Sidek (Malaysia) Razif Sidek	15–8, 15–11	(gold) Winner
1991	Indonesia Open	(South Korea) Kim Moon-soo	(Indonesia) Rudy Gunawan (Indonesia) Eddy Hartono	18–15, 15–13	(gold) Winner
1991	Singapore Open	(South Korea) Kim Moon-soo	(China) Huang Zhanzhong (China) Zheng Yumin	15–2, 15–4	(gold) Winner
1991	Denmark Open	(South Korea) Kim Moon-soo	(China) Huang Zhanzhong (China) Zheng Yumin	10–15, 9–15	(silver) Runner-up
1992	Korea Open	(South Korea) Kim Moon-soo	(China) Li Yongbo (China) Tian Bingyi	15–10, 15–10	(gold) Winner

Mixed doubles
Year	Tournament	Partner	Opponent	Score	Result
1986	All England Open	(South Korea) Chung Myung-hee	(South Korea) Lee Deuk-choon (South Korea) Chung So-young	15–5, 15–5	(gold) Winner
1986	China Open	(South Korea) Chung Myung-hee	(England) Nigel Tier (England) Gillian Gowers	15–4, 15–5	(gold) Winner
1987	French Open	(South Korea) Kim Yun-ja	(Denmark) Mark Christiansen (Netherlands) Erica van Dijck	15–10, 15–7	(gold) Winner
1988	Japan Open	(South Korea) Chung Myung-hee	(South Korea) Lee Deuk-choon (South Korea) Chung So-young	Walkover	(gold) Winner
1988	French Open	(South Korea) Chung Myung-hee	(Thailand) Sakrapee Thongsari (Thailand) Piyathip Sansaniyakulvilai	15–6, 15–6	(gold) Winner
1988	Hong Kong Open	(South Korea) Chung Myung-hee	(Hong Kong) Chan Chi Choi (Hong Kong) Amy Chan	15–7, 15–6	(gold) Winner
1988	China Open	(South Korea) Chung Myung-hee	(China) Wang Pengren (China) Shi Fangjing	15–6, 15–5	(gold) Winner
1989	Japan Open	(South Korea) Chung Myung-hee	(South Korea) Lee Sang-bok (South Korea) Chung So-young	15–6, 15–3	(gold) Winner
1989	Swedish Open	(South Korea) Chung Myung-hee	(China) Wang Pengren (China) Shi Fangjing	15–9, 15–4	(gold) Winner
1989	All England Open	(South Korea) Chung Myung-hee	(Sweden) Jan-Eric Antonsson (Sweden) Maria Bengtsson	15–1, 15–9	(gold) Winner
1989	Malaysia Open	(South Korea) Chung So-young	(Denmark) Thomas Lund (Denmark) Pernille Dupont	15–7, 15–13	(gold) Winner
1989	Thailand Open	(South Korea) Chung So-young	(South Korea) Kim Moon-soo (South Korea) Hwang Hye-young	15–4, 15–2	(gold) Winner
1990	Japan Open	(South Korea) Chung Myung-hee	(Denmark) Thomas Lund (Denmark) Pernille Dupont	15–10, 15–12	(gold) Winner
1990	All England Open	(South Korea) Chung Myung-hee	(Denmark) Jon Holst-Christensen (Denmark) Grete Mogensen	15–6, 15–3	(gold) Winner
1990	French Open	(South Korea) Chung Myung-hee	(South Korea) Kim Moon-soo (South Korea) Chung So-young	4–15, 6–15	(silver) Runner-up
1990	Thailand Open	(South Korea) Chung Myung-hee	(China) Zheng Yumin (China) Wu Yuhong	15–3, 15–3	(gold) Winner
1990	Malaysia Open	(South Korea) Chung Myung-hee	(Denmark) Jan Paulsen (England) Gillian Gowers	15–12, 15–1	(gold) Winner
1991	Japan Open	(South Korea) Chung Myung-hee	(Denmark) Jon Holst-Christensen (Denmark) Grete Mogensen	15–7, 15–8	(gold) Winner
1991	Korea Open	(South Korea) Chung Myung-hee	(Sweden) Pär-Gunnar Jönsson (Sweden) Maria Bengtsson	15–0, 15–0	(gold) Winner
1991	All England Open	(South Korea) Chung Myung-hee	(Denmark) Thomas Lund (Denmark) Pernille Dupont	15–10, 10–15, 15–4	(gold) Winner
1995	Hong Kong Open	(South Korea) Shim Eun-jung	(China) Liu Jianjun (China) Sun Man	15–8, 2–15, 17–14	(gold) Winner
1995	China Open	(South Korea) Shim Eun-jung	(China) Chen Xingdong (China) Peng Xinyong	11–15, 15–4, 10–15	(silver) Runner-up
1995	Thailand Open	(South Korea) Ra Kyung-min	(Russia) Nikolai Zuyev (Russia) Marina Yakusheva	15–1, 15–4	(gold) Winner
1996	Japan Open	(South Korea) Ra Kyung-min	(South Korea) Kim Dong-moon (South Korea) Gil Young-ah	15–7, 15–1	(gold) Winner
1996	Korea Open	(South Korea) Ra Kyung-min	(England) Simon Archer (England) Julie Bradbury	15–9, 15–11	(gold) Winner
1996	Swedish Open	(South Korea) Ra Kyung-min	(China) Chen Xingdong (China) Peng Xinyong	15–4, 15–6	(gold) Winner
1996	All England Open	(South Korea) Ra Kyung-min	(England) Simon Archer (England) Julie Bradbury	15–10, 15–10	(gold) Winner

=== IBF International (4 titles) ===
Men's doubles
Year	Tournament	Partner	Opponent	Score	Result
1988	Polish International	(South Korea) Lee Sang-bok	(China) Fu Qiang (China) Li Jian	15–3, 15–9	(gold) Winner
1991	USSR International	(South Korea) Kim Moon-soo	(South Korea) Kim Hyung-jin (South Korea) Park Sung-woo	15–4, 15–5	(gold) Winner
1993	Iran Fajr International	(South Korea) Kim Moon-soo	(Iran) Hameed Nasimi (Iran) Mansour Shakoori	15–6, 15–5	(gold) Winner

Mixed doubles
Year	Tournament	Partner	Opponent	Score	Result
1988	Polish International	(South Korea) Chung Myung-hee	(Soviet Union) Sergey Sevryukov (Soviet Union) Irina Serova	15–9, 15–4	(gold) Winner

=== International tournament (1 title, 1 runner-up) ===
Men's doubles
Year	Tournament	Partner	Opponent	Score	Result
1982	Denmark Open	(South Korea) Lee Eun-ku	(Indonesia) Christian Hadinata (Indonesia) Lius Pongoh	15–9, 11–15, 18–16	(gold) Winner
1982	India Open	(South Korea) Lee Eun-ku	(Sweden) Stefan Karlsson (Sweden) Thomas Kihlström	10–15, 12–15	(silver) Runner-up

=== Invitational tournament (1 runners-up) ===
Men's doubles
Year	Tournament	Partner	Opponent	Score	Result
1988	Asian Invitational Championships; Bandar Lampung, Indonesia	(South Korea) Lee Sang-bok	(China) Zhang Qiang (China) Zhou Jincan	4–15, 6–15	Silver
