= Zhang Qingwu =

Chinese badminton player (born 1963)

Zhang Qingwu 张青武
Personal information
- Born: 5 January 1964 (age 62) Fuzhou, Fujian, China
- Years active: 1984–1990
- Height: 178 cm (5 ft 10 in)
- Weight: 70 kg (154 lb)

Sport
- Country: China
- Sport: Badminton
- Handedness: Left
- Retired: 1990
- Event: Men's singles

Men's singles
- BWF profile
Medal record
Men's badminton
Representing China
Thomas Cup
Gold medal – first place	1988 Kuala Lumpur	Men's team
Asian Championships
Gold medal – first place	1987 Semarang	Men's team

Zhang Qingwu (Chinese: 张青武; born 5 January 1964) is a former Chinese badminton player that born in Fuzhou and a badminton coach for Singapore national badminton team in 2000's.

== Career ==
Zhang first started his badminton career in 1975 in Fujian Provincial Sports School for Children and selected for provincial squad in 1977. Zhang is well known for his comprehensive skills, strong tactical awareness, and is good at combining pulling and lobbing, waiting for opportunities to counterattack.

In 1984, Zhang was appointed into national squad and proven his worth on the first hand by winning U.S. Open men's doubles event in 1984 with Chen Hongyong. Since that first win, Zhang mainly switched to men's singles event and manage to get his first win of men's singles in Polish Open in 1986 against Swedish Jens Olsson. His greatest individual triumph came at 1988 World Badminton Grand Prix Finals when he managed to win against his teammate, Xiong Guobao in 3 sets.

Zhang is a key player in 1987 Asian Badminton Championships where he won all 3 groups matches and winning the decider in the final match against Indonesian Joko Suprianto with the scoreline of 15–8, 15–12. Zhang is also involved in 1988 Thomas Cup squad but he did not play a single match as a fourth choice single behind Yang Yang, Zhao Jianhua and Xiong Guobao. Zhang retired in 1990 due to several injuries.

== Post-retirement and coaching career ==
Zhang back to his provincial team after retiring until 1992 when he joined the coaching of the Singapore national badminton team. He left the squad in 1994 to focus on his new business and took part on several part time coaches mainly for Fujian Provincial Team. In 2000, he joined Badminton Association Malaysia (BAM) as a coach for a short stint before returning to Singapore the next year, this time as a head coach.

== Achievements ==
=== IBF World Grand Prix ===
The World Badminton Grand Prix sanctioned by International Badminton Federation (IBF) from 1983 to 2006.

Men's singles
Year	Tournament	Opponent	Score	Result
1988	Japan Open	(England) Nick Yates	13–18, 15–9, 5–15	(silver) Runner-up
1988	Denmark Open	(Denmark) Poul-Erik Hoyer Larsen	9–15, 16–18	(silver) Runner-up
1988	World Grand Prix Finals	(China) Xiong Guobao	15–10, 4–15, 15–8	(gold) Winner

Men's doubles
Year	Tournament	Partner	Opponent	Score	Result
1985	English Masters	(China) Chen Kang	(England) Andy Goode (England) Nigel Tier	7–15, 9–15	(silver) Runner-up

=== IBF International ===
Men's singles
Year	Tournament	Opponent	Score	Result
1986	Polish Open	(Sweden) Jens Olsson	15–8, 15–3	(gold) Winner

Men's doubles
Year	Tournament	Partner	Opponent	Score	Result
1984	U.S. Open	(China) Chen Hongyong	(China) Chen Kang (China) Huang Zhen	12–15, 15–5, 15–7	(gold) Winner
