= Chung Myung-hee =

South Korean badminton player (born 1964)

Personal information
- Born: 27 January 1964 (age 62)
- Height: 170 cm (5 ft 7 in)

Sport
- Country: South Korea
- Sport: Badminton
- Handedness: Right
Medal record
Women's badminton
Representing South Korea
World Championships
| Gold medal – first place | 1989 Jakarta | Mixed doubles |
| Gold medal – first place | 1991 Copenhagen | Mixed doubles |
| Silver medal – second place | 1987 Beijing | Mixed doubles |
| Silver medal – second place | 1989 Jakarta | Women doubles |
| Bronze medal – third place | 1987 Beijing | Women doubles |
World Cup
| Gold medal – first place | 1989 Guangzhou | Mixed doubles |
| Silver medal – second place | 1988 Bangkok | Mixed doubles |
| Bronze medal – third place | 1986 Bandung & Jakarta | Women's doubles |
| Bronze medal – third place | 1987 Kuala Lumpur | Women's doubles |
| Bronze medal – third place | 1987 Kuala Lumpur | Mixed doubles |
Sudirman Cup
| Gold medal – first place | 1991 Copenhagen | Mixed team |
| Silver medal – second place | 1989 Jakarta | Mixed team |
Uber Cup
| Silver medal – second place | 1988 Kuala Lumpur | Women's team |
| Silver medal – second place | 1990 Tokyo | Women's team |
| Silver medal – second place | 1992 Kuala Lumpur | Women's team |
Asian Games
| Gold medal – first place | 1986 Seoul | Mixed doubles |
| Gold medal – first place | 1990 Beijing | Mixed doubles |
| Bronze medal – third place | 1986 Seoul | Women's team |
| Bronze medal – third place | 1990 Beijing | Women's team |
Asian Championships
| Gold medal – first place | 1991 Kuala Lumpur | Mixed doubles |
| Bronze medal – third place | 1983 Calcutta | Women's doubles |

- Chung Myung-hee
- Hangul: 정명희
- Hanja: 鄭明熙
- RR: Jeong Myeonghui
- MR: Chŏng Myŏnghŭi

Chung Myung-hee (Korean: 정명희; born 27 January 1964) is a former female badminton player from South Korea.

Chung was a nine-time All England Open champion (four-time in women's doubles and five-time in mixed doubles), and won the gold medals at the 1989 and 1991 IBF World Championships in mixed doubles, with Park Joo-bong. She also won a silver medal in the 1989 in women's doubles, with Hwang Hye-young, and a silver and a bronze medal at the 1987 IBF World Championships in mixed doubles and women's doubles respectively.

Chung was inducted to the Badminton Hall of Fame in 2003.

== Major achievements ==
=== Olympic Games ===
Mixed doubles
| Year | Venue | Partner | Opponent | Score | Result |
|---|---|---|---|---|---|
| 1988 | Seoul National University Gymnasium, Seoul, South Korea (exhibition) | (South Korea) Park Joo-bong | (China) Shi Fangjing (China) Wang Pengren | 15–3, 15–7 | Gold |

=== World Championships ===
Women's doubles
| Year | Venue | Partner | Opponent | Score | Result |
|---|---|---|---|---|---|
| 1987 | Capital Indoor Stadium, Beijing, China | (South Korea) Hwang Hye-young | (China) Li Lingwei (China) Han Aiping | 6–15, 15–6, 11–15 | Bronze |
| 1989 | Senayan Sports Complex, Jakarta, Indonesia | (South Korea) Hwang Hye-young | (China) Lin Ying (China) Guan Weizhen | 1–15, 7–15 | Silver |

Mixed doubles
| Year | Venue | Partner | Opponent | Score | Result |
|---|---|---|---|---|---|
| 1987 | Capital Indoor Stadium, Beijing, China | (South Korea) Lee Deuk-choon | (China) Wang Pengren (China) Shi Fangjing | 6–15, 15–12, 10–15 | Silver |
| 1989 | Senayan Sports Complex, Jakarta, Indonesia | (South Korea) Park Joo-bong | (Indonesia) Eddy Hartono (Indonesia) Verawaty Fadjrin | 15–9, 15–9 | Gold |
| 1991 | Brøndby Arena, Copenhagen, Denmark | (South Korea) Park Joo-bong | (Denmark) Thomas Lund (Denmark) Pernille Dupont | 15–5, 15–17, 15–9 | Gold |

=== World Cup ===
Women's doubles
| Year | Venue | Partner | Opponent | Score | Result |
|---|---|---|---|---|---|
| 1986 | Senayan Sports Complex, Jakarta, Indonesia | (South Korea) Hwang Hye-young | (China) Li Lingwei (China) Han Aiping | 7–15, 7–15 | Bronze |
| 1987 | Stadium Negara, Kuala Lumpur, Malaysia | (South Korea) Hwang Hye-young | (China) Lin Ying (China) Guan Weizhen | 14–18, 8–15 | Bronze |

Mixed doubles
| Year | Venue | Partner | Opponent | Score | Result |
|---|---|---|---|---|---|
| 1987 | Stadium Negara, Kuala Lumpur, Malaysia | (South Korea) Lee Deuk-choon | (Denmark) Steen Fladberg (England) Gillian Clark | 8–15, 9–15 | Bronze |
| 1988 | National Stadium, Bangkok, Thailand | (South Korea) Park Joo-bong | (China) Shi Fangjing (China) Wang Pengren | 17–15, 13–18, 8–15 | Silver |
| 1989 | Canton Gymnasium, Guangzhou, China | (South Korea) Park Joo-bong | (South Korea) Kim Moon-soo (South Korea) Chung So-young | 15–5, 15–9 | Gold |

=== Asian Games ===
Mixed doubles
| Year | Venue | Partner | Opponent | Score | Result |
|---|---|---|---|---|---|
| 1986 | Olympic Gymnastics Arena, Seoul, South Korea | (South Korea) Park Joo-bong | (South Korea) Lee Deuk-choon (South Korea) Chung So-young | 15–10, 15–3 | Gold |
| 1990 | Beijing Gymnasium, Beijing, China | (South Korea) Park Joo-bong | (Indonesia) Eddy Hartono (Indonesia) Verawaty Fadjrin | 15–7, 7–15, 15–3 | Gold |

=== Asian Championships ===
Women's doubles
| Year | Venue | Partner | Opponent | Score | Result |
|---|---|---|---|---|---|
| 1983 | Netaji Indoor Stadium, Calcutta, India | (South Korea) Yoo Sang-hee | (China) Fan Ming (China) Guan Weizhen | 15–10, 6–15, 14–17 | Bronze |

Mixed doubles
| Year | Venue | Partner | Opponent | Score | Result |
|---|---|---|---|---|---|
| 1991 | Stadium Negara, Kuala Lumpur, Malaysia | (South Korea) Park Joo-bong | (South Korea) Lee Sang-bok (South Korea) Chung So-young | 15–7, 15–4 | Gold |

=== IBF World Grand Prix (36 titles, 13 runners-up) ===
The World Badminton Grand Prix sanctioned by International Badminton Federation (IBF) from 1983 to 2006.

Women's doubles
| Year | Tournament | Partner | Opponent | Score | Result |
|---|---|---|---|---|---|
| 1986 | All England Open | (South Korea) Hwang Hye-young | (South Korea) Kim Yun-ja (South Korea) Yoo Sang-hee | 15–5, 6–15, 15–8 | (gold) Winner |
| 1986 | Scandinavian Open | (South Korea) Chung So-young | (South Korea) Kim Yun-ja (South Korea) Yoo Sang-hee | 7–15, 14–17 | (silver) Runner-up |
| 1986 | German Open | (South Korea) Hwang Hye-young | (South Korea) Kim Yun-ja (South Korea) Yoo Sang-hee | 10–15, 5–15 | (silver) Runner-up |
| 1986 | World Grand Prix Finals | (South Korea) Hwang Hye-young | (Indonesia) Verawaty Fadjrin (Indonesia) Ivana Lie | 15–10, 15–6 | (gold) Winner |
| 1987 | All England Open | (South Korea) Hwang Hye-young | (China) Guan Weizhen (China) Lin Ying | 15–6, 8–15, 15–11 | (gold) Winner |
| 1987 | Japan Open | (South Korea) Hwang Hye-young | (China) Guan Weizhen (China) Lin Ying | 5–15, 6–15 | (silver) Runner-up |
| 1987 | Chinese Taipei Open | (South Korea) Hwang Hye-young | (Sweden) Maria Bengtsson (Sweden) Christine Magnusson | 14–17, 15–9, 15–4 | (gold) Winner |
| 1987 | French Open | (South Korea) Hwang Hye-young | (South Korea) Chung So-young (South Korea) Kim Ho-ja | 4–15, 15–9, 15–7 | (gold) Winner |
| 1987 | World Grand Prix Finals | (South Korea) Hwang Hye-young | (China) Guan Weizhen (China) Lin Ying | 6–15, 15–13, 4–15 | (silver) Runner-up |
| 1988 | Japan Open | (South Korea) Chung So-young | (England) Gillian Clark (England) Gillian Gowers | 15–2, 7–15, 15–6 | (gold) Winner |
| 1988 | All England Open | (South Korea) Hwang Hye-young | (South Korea) Chung So-young (South Korea) Kim Yun-ja | 8–15, 15–9 retired | (silver) Runner-up |
| 1988 | Indonesia Open | (South Korea) Hwang Hye-young | (Indonesia) Verawaty Fadjrin (Indonesia) Yanti Kusmiati | 6–15, 15–6, 8–15 | (silver) Runner-up |
| 1988 | Thailand Open | (South Korea) Hwang Hye-young | (China) Luo Yun (China) Shi Wen | 15–7, 17–16 | (gold) Winner |
| 1988 | French Open | (South Korea) Hwang Hye-young | (South Korea) Chung So-young (South Korea) Kim Yun-ja | 15–9, 18–13 | (gold) Winner |
| 1988 | World Grand Prix Finals | (South Korea) Hwang Hye-young | (China) Guan Weizhen (China) Lin Ying | 4–15, 9–15 | (silver) Runner-up |
| 1989 | Japan Open | (South Korea) Chung So-young | (England) Gillian Clark (England) Julie Munday | 4–15, 15–10, 3–15 | (silver) Runner-up |
| 1989 | Swedish Open | (South Korea) Chung So-young | (South Korea) Hwang Hye-young (South Korea) Lee Young-suk | 15–3, 15–5 | (gold) Winner |
| 1989 | All England Open | (South Korea) Chung So-young | (China) Sun Xiaoqing (China) Zhou Lei | 15–7, 15–4 | (gold) Winner |
| 1990 | All England Open | (South Korea) Hwang Hye-young | (England) Gillian Clark (England) Gillian Gowers | 6–15, 15–4, 15–4 | (gold) Winner |
| 1990 | French Open | (South Korea) Hwang Hye-young | (Indonesia) Verawaty Fadjrin (Indonesia) Ivana Lie | 15–2, 15–1 | (gold) Winner |
| 1990 | Thailand Open | (South Korea) Chung So-young | (China) Lai Caiqin (China) Yao Fen | 11–15, 15–10, 12–15 | (silver) Runner-up |
| 1990 | Malaysia Open | (South Korea) Chung So-young | (China) Lai Caiqin (China) Yao Fen | 7–15, 15–9, 15–9 | (gold) Winner |
| 1990 | Indonesia Open | (South Korea) Chung So-young | (Indonesia) Erma Sulistianingsih (Indonesia) Rosiana Tendean | 17–15, 8–15, 15–3 | (gold) Winner |
| 1991 | Indonesia Open | (South Korea) Hwang Hye-young | (South Korea) Chung So-young (South Korea) Gil Young-ah | 14–18, 15–10, 15–9 | (gold) Winner |
| 1991 | Singapore Open | (South Korea) Chung So-young | (Sweden) Lim Xiaoqing (Sweden) Christine Magnusson | 15–11, 15–3 | (gold) Winner |
| 1991 | China Open | (South Korea) Chung Myung-hee | (China) Guan Weizhen (China) Nong Qunhua | 15–6, 15–2 | (gold) Winner |
| 1991 | Hong Kong Open | (South Korea) Shim Eun-jung | (South Korea) Hwang Hye-young (South Korea) Gil Young-ah | 10–15, 4–15 | (silver) Runner-up |

Mixed doubles
| Year | Tournament | Partner | Opponent | Score | Result |
|---|---|---|---|---|---|
| 1985 | Swedish Open | (South Korea) Lee Deuk-choon | (Sweden) Stefan Karlsson (Sweden) Maria Bengtsson | 5–15, 15–11, 7–15 | (silver) Runner-up |
| 1986 | German Open | (South Korea) Lee Deuk-choon | (England) Martin Dew (England) Gillian Gilks | 10–15, 18–17, 15–10 | (gold) Winner |
| 1986 | Scandinavian Open | (South Korea) Lee Deuk-choon | (England) Martin Dew (England) Gillian Gilks | 16–17, 15–12, 7–15 | (silver) Runner-up |
| 1986 | All England Open | (South Korea) Park Joo-bong | (South Korea) Lee Deuk-choon (South Korea) Chung So-young | 15–5, 15–5 | (gold) Winner |
| 1986 | China Open | (South Korea) Park Joo-bong | (England) Nigel Tier (England) Gillian Gowers | 15–4, 15–5 | (gold) Winner |
| 1987 | Japan Open | (South Korea) Lee Deuk-choon | (Scotland) Billy Gilliland (England) Gillian Gowers | 15–2, 15–5 | (gold) Winner |
| 1987 | All England Open | (South Korea) Lee Deuk-choon | (Sweden) Jan-Eric Antonsson (Sweden) Christine Magnusson | 15–5, 14–18, 15–8 | (gold) Winner |
| 1988 | Japan Open | (South Korea) Park Joo-bong | (South Korea) Lee Deuk-choon (South Korea) Chung So-young | Walkover | (gold) Winner |
| 1988 | French Open | (South Korea) Park Joo-bong | (Thailand) Sakrapee Thongsari (Thailand) Piyathip Sansaniyakulvilai | 15–6, 15–6 | (gold) Winner |
| 1988 | Hong Kong Open | (South Korea) Park Joo-bong | (Hong Kong) Chan Chi Choi (Hong Kong) Amy Chan | 15–7, 15–6 | (gold) Winner |
| 1988 | China Open | (South Korea) Park Joo-bong | (China) Wang Pengren (China) Shi Fangjing | 15–6, 15–5 | (gold) Winner |
| 1989 | Japan Open | (South Korea) Park Joo-bong | (South Korea) Lee Sang-bok (South Korea) Chung So-young | 15–6, 15–3 | (gold) Winner |
| 1989 | Swedish Open | (South Korea) Park Joo-bong | (China) Wang Pengren (China) Shi Fangjing | 15–9, 15–4 | (gold) Winner |
| 1989 | All England Open | (South Korea) Park Joo-bong | (Sweden) Jan-Eric Antonsson (Sweden) Maria Bengtsson | 15–1, 15–9 | (gold) Winner |
| 1990 | Japan Open | (South Korea) Park Joo-bong | (Denmark) Thomas Lund (Denmark) Pernille Dupont | 15–10, 15–12 | (gold) Winner |
| 1990 | All England Open | (South Korea) Park Joo-bong | (Denmark) Jon Holst-Christensen (Denmark) Grete Mogensen | 15–6, 15–3 | (gold) Winner |
| 1990 | French Open | (South Korea) Park Joo-bong | (South Korea) Kim Moon-soo (South Korea) Chung So-young | 4–15, 6–15 | (silver) Runner-up |
| 1990 | Thailand Open | (South Korea) Park Joo-bong | (China) Zheng Yumin (China) Wu Yuhong | 15–3, 15–3 | (gold) Winner |
| 1990 | Malaysia Open | (South Korea) Park Joo-bong | (Denmark) Jan Paulsen (England) Gillian Gowers | 15–12, 15–1 | (gold) Winner |
| 1991 | Japan Open | (South Korea) Park Joo-bong | (Denmark) Jon Holst-Christensen (Denmark) Grete Mogensen | 15–7, 15–8 | (gold) Winner |
| 1991 | Korea Open | (South Korea) Park Joo-bong | (Sweden) Pär-Gunnar Jönsson (Sweden) Maria Bengtsson | 15–0, 15–0 | (gold) Winner |
| 1991 | All England Open | (South Korea) Park Joo-bong | (Denmark) Thomas Lund (Denmark) Pernille Dupont | 15–10, 10–15, 15–4 | (gold) Winner |

=== IBF International (3 titles, 1 runner-up) ===
Women's doubles
| Year | Tournament | Partner | Opponent | Score | Result |
|---|---|---|---|---|---|
| 1988 | Polish International | (South Korea) Hwang Hye-young | (South Korea) Lee Heung-soon (South Korea) Lee Young-suk | 15–6, 15–9 | (gold) Winner |
| 1989 | Hungarian International | (South Korea) Chung So-young | (South Korea) Chun Sung-suk (South Korea) Lee Jung-mi | 11–15, 15–10, 9–15 | (silver) Runner-up |

Mixed doubles
| Year | Tournament | Partner | Opponent | Score | Result |
|---|---|---|---|---|---|
| 1988 | Polish International | (South Korea) Park Joo-bong | (Soviet Union) Sergey Sevryukov (Soviet Union) Irina Serova | 15–9, 15–4 | (gold) Winner |
| 1989 | Hungarian International | (South Korea) Sung Han-kook | (South Korea) Shon Jin-hwan (South Korea) Chung So-young | 9–15, 15–10, 15–4 | (gold) Winner |

=== Invitational Tournament (1 title, 1 runner-up) ===
Women's doubles
| Year | Tournament | Partner | Opponent | Score | Result |
|---|---|---|---|---|---|
| 1987 | Konica Cup | (South Korea) Hwang Hye-young | (Indonesia) Ivana Lie (Indonesia) Rosiana Tendean | 15–5, 15–4 | (gold) Winner |
| 1989 | Konica Cup | (South Korea) Hwang Hye-young | (China) Guan Weizhen (China) Lin Ying | 6–15, 8–15 | (silver) Runner-up |
