= Seoul National University Gymnasium =

Sports venue in Seoul, South Korea

Coordinates: 37.467527°N 126.952472°E

Seoul National University Gymnasium is an indoor sporting arena located in Seoul, South Korea. The capacity of the arena is 5,000 and was built in 1986 to host table tennis and badminton (demonstration) events at the 1988 Summer Olympics.
