= Badminton at the 1990 Asian Games – Men's team =

Men's team at the 1990 Asian Games
- Venue: Beijing Gymnasium
- Dates: 28–30 September
- Competitors: 59 from 9 nations

Medalists
gold medal	China; Huang Zhanzhong, Li Yongbo, Tian Bingyi, Wu Wenkai, Xiong Guobao, Yang Yang, Zhao Jianhua, Zheng Yumin
silver medal	Malaysia; Cheah Soon Kit, Foo Kok Keong, Kwan Yoke Meng, Jalani Sidek, Rashid Sidek, Razif Sidek, Soo Beng Kiang
bronze medal	South Korea; Ahn Jae-chang, Choi Sang-bum, Kim Hak-kyun, Kim Moon-soo, Lee Kwang-jin, Park Joo-bong, Shon Jin-hwan, Sung Han-kook
bronze medal	Indonesia; Alan Budikusuma, Rudy Gunawan, Eddy Hartono, Richard Mainaky, Aryono Miranat, Joko Suprianto, Hermawan Susanto, Ardy Wiranata

The badminton men's team tournament at the 1990 Asian Games in Beijing Sports Complex, Beijing took place from 28 September to 30 September.

China won the gold medal after defeating Malaysia 5–0 in the final, Malaysia finished second, South Korea and Indonesia won the bronze medal by finishing on the 3rd position. South Korea lost 5–0 to China in the semifinal while Indonesia lost a close match 3–2 to regional rival Malaysia.

Japan, Thailand, North Korea and Hong Kong lost in quarterfinals and finished fifth while Pakistan finished 7th after losing to Thailand in 1st round.

== Schedule ==
All times are China Standard Time (UTC+08:00)

Date	Time	Event
Friday, 28 September 1990	13:00	1st round
Friday, 28 September 1990	13:00	Quarterfinals
Saturday, 29 September 1990	13:00	Semifinals
Sunday, 30 September 1990	13:00	Final

== Results ==
1st round
Thailand	5
Pakistan	0

Quarterfinals
1	China	5
Japan	0
3/4	South Korea	4
Hong Kong	1
Thailand	0
3/4	Indonesia	5
North Korea	0
2	Malaysia	5

Semifinals
1	China	5
3/4	South Korea	0
3/4	Indonesia	2
2	Malaysia	3

Final
1	China	5
2	Malaysia	0

=== 1st round ===
28 September	Thailand	5–0	Pakistan

Sompol Kukasemkij	2–0	Ali Yar Baig	15–13, 15–10
Vacharapan Kumthong	2–0	Saqib Majeed	17–15, 15–3
Siripong Siripool / Pramote Teerawiwatana	2–0	Saqib Majeed / Amer Islam	15–5, 15–5
Surachai Makkasasithorn / Patpong Thongsari	2–0	Ali Yar Baig / Iftikhar Hussain	15–6, 15–6
Kasemsak Chatujinda	2–1	Amer Islam	15–5, 11–15, 15–7

=== Quarterfinals ===
28 September	China	5–0	Japan

28 September	South Korea	4–1	Hong Kong

28 September	Thailand	0–5	Indonesia

28 September	North Korea	0–5	Malaysia

Chang Son-nam	0–2	Rashid Sidek	0–15, 7–15
Ri Nam-chol	0–2	Foo Kok Keong	9–15, 4–15
Ri Nam-chol / Ri Yong-hwan	0–2	Razif Sidek / Jalani Sidek	5–15, 3–15
Chang Son-nam / Pak Song-jun	0–2	Cheah Soon Kit / Soo Beng Kiang	1–15, 2–15
Ri Yong-hwan	0–2	Kwan Yoke Meng	7–15, 2–15

=== Semifinals ===
29 September	China	5–0	South Korea

Yang Yang	2–0	Kim Hak-kyun	15–9, 15–2
Xiong Guobao	2–0	Lee Kwang-jin	15–4, 15–5
Tian Bingyi / Li Yongbo	2–0	Park Joo-bong / Shon Jin-hwan	15–11, 15–9
Zheng Yumin / Huang Zhanzhong	2–0	Sung Han-kook / Choi Sang-bum	15–3, 15–9
Zhao Jianhua	2–0	Ahn Jae-chang	15–4, 15–7

29 September	Indonesia	2–3	Malaysia

Alan Budikusuma	2–0	Rashid Sidek	15–1, 15–1
Ardy Wiranata	2–1	Foo Kok Keong	11–15, 15–10, 15–7
Eddy Hartono / Richard Mainaky	1–2	Razif Sidek / Jalani Sidek	10–15, 15–10, 15–17
Rudy Gunawan / Aryono Miranat	1–2	Cheah Soon Kit / Soo Beng Kiang	15–18, 15–11, 8–15
Hermawan Susanto	1–2	Kwan Yoke Meng	11–15, 15–8, 16–17

=== Final ===
30 September	China	5–0	Malaysia

Yang Yang	2–0	Rashid Sidek	18–13, 15–9
Xiong Guobao	2–0	Foo Kok Keong	15–8, 15–8
Tian Bingyi / Li Yongbo	2–1	Razif Sidek / Jalani Sidek	15–3, 10–15, 15–10
Zheng Yumin / Huang Zhanzhong	2–1	Cheah Soon Kit / Soo Beng Kiang	8–15, 15–5, 15–9
Zhao Jianhua	2–0	Kwan Yoke Meng	15–2, 15–2
