= Sepak takraw at the 1990 Asian Games =

- Venue: Fengtai Gymnasium
- Dates: 24 September – 3 October 1990
- Nations: 8

Sepak takraw was contested at the 1990 Asian Games in Beijing, China by men, with all games taking place at Fengtai Sports Center.

Malaysia won gold medals in both men's Regu and Men's Team Regu, and finished first in the medal table. Thailand bagged both silvers and Singapore won bronze in both events.

== Medalists ==
Event	Gold	Silver	Bronze
Regu	Malaysia; Noor Rani Adnan; Rehan Mohamad Din; Nordin Sabarudin; Malik Samsudin	Thailand; Pakdee Dangwatanapaibul; Chucheep Kongmeechon; Kriengkrai Mutalai; Surat Na Chiengmai	Singapore; Eddie Abdul Kadir; Rafi Abdul Majid; Nur Hisham Adam; Padzli Othman
Team regu	Malaysia; Rosli Abdul Rahman; Mohd Noor Abdullah; Noor Rani Adnan; Ahmad Jais Baharun; Rehan Mohamad Din; Shaari Hashim; Raziman Hassan; Baharum Jahar; Engku Halim Ku Musa; Nordin Sabarudin; Malik Samsudin; Suhaimi Yusof	Thailand; Wisut Boonsuya; Pakdee Dangwatanapaibul; Somsak Duangmuang; Narongchai Kaewnopparat; Ittiphol Komchaisak; Chucheep Kongmeechon; Chairat Kreungdi; Paisal Maihunla; Kriengkrai Mutalai; Surat Na Chiengmai; Wirat Pomuang; Khamnuan Sonnanon	Singapore; Eddie Abdul Kadir; Rafi Abdul Majid; Nur Hisham Adam; Raffi Buang; Hairulnizam Hamzah; Shaharuddin Jumani; Zulkefle Khamis; Mohd Fami Mohamed; Hassan Nanang; Padzli Othman

== Medal table ==
Rank	Nation	Gold	Silver	Bronze	Total
1	Malaysia (MAL)	2	0	0	2
2	Thailand (THA)	0	2	0	2
3	Singapore (SIN)	0	0	2	2
Totals (3 entries)		2	2	2	6

== Participating nations ==
- Brunei
- China (12)
- Japan
- Laos
- Malaysia (12)
- Singapore (10)
- South Korea
- Thailand (12)
