= Badminton at the 1990 Asian Games – Men's doubles =

Men's doubles at the 1990 Asian Games
- Venue: Beijing Gymnasium
- Dates: 2–6 October 1990
- Competitors: 38 from 10 nations

Medalists
gold medal	Tian Bingyi; Li Yongbo	China
silver medal	Park Joo-bong; Kim Moon-soo	South Korea
bronze medal	Eddy Hartono; Rudy Gunawan	Indonesia
bronze medal	Razif Sidek; Jalani Sidek	Malaysia

The badminton men's doubles tournament at the 1990 Asian Games in Beijing took place from 2 October to 6 October.

== Schedule ==
All times are China Standard Time (UTC+08:00)

Date	Time	Event
Tuesday, 2 October 1990	13:00	1st round
Tuesday, 2 October 1990	13:00	2nd round
Wednesday, 3 October 1990	13:00	Quarterfinals
Friday, 5 October 1990	13:00	Semifinals
Saturday, 6 October 1990	13:00	Final

== Results ==
Legend

- WO — Won by walkover

=== Final ===
Final
1	Park Joo-bong (KOR); Kim Moon-soo (KOR)	8	4
3/4	Tian Bingyi (CHN); Li Yongbo (CHN)	15	15

=== Top half ===
1st round
Huang Zhanzhong (CHN); Zheng Yumin (CHN)	15	15
Surachai Makkasasithorn (THA); Patpong Thongsari (THA)	9	4

2nd round
1	Park Joo-bong (KOR); Kim Moon-soo (KOR)	15	15
Fumihiko Machida (JPN); Koji Miya (JPN)	6	5
Chan Chi Choi (HKG); Ng Pak Kum (HKG)	W	O
Ri Nam-chol (PRK); Ri Yong-hwan (PRK)
3/4	Eddy Hartono (INA); Rudy Gunawan (INA)	15	15
Cheah Soon Kit (MAL); Soo Beng Kiang (MAL)	7	5
Ali Yar Baig (PAK); Iftikhar Hussain (PAK)	3	3
Huang Zhanzhong (CHN); Zheng Yumin (CHN)	15	15

Quarterfinals
1	Park Joo-bong (KOR); Kim Moon-soo (KOR)	15	15
Chan Chi Choi (HKG); Ng Pak Kum (HKG)	4	8
3/4	Eddy Hartono (INA); Rudy Gunawan (INA)	15	8	15
Huang Zhanzhong (CHN); Zheng Yumin (CHN)	11	15	10

Semifinals
1	Park Joo-bong (KOR); Kim Moon-soo (KOR)	15	15
3/4	Eddy Hartono (INA); Rudy Gunawan (INA)	10	8

=== Bottom half ===
1st round
Ng Liang Hua (HKG); Chan Wing Kit (HKG)	W	O
Kim Jong-guk (PRK); Pak Gwang-so (PRK)
Pramote Teerawiwatana (THA); Siripong Siripool (THA)	15	15
Duminda Jayakody (SRI); Niroshan Wijekoon (SRI)	1	7

2nd round
Ng Liang Hua (HKG); Chan Wing Kit (HKG)	W	O
Shinji Matsuura (JPN); Shuji Matsuno (JPN)
Richard Mainaky (INA); Aryono Miranat (INA)	9	6
3/4	Tian Bingyi (CHN); Li Yongbo (CHN)	15	15
Pramote Teerawiwatana (THA); Siripong Siripool (THA)	15	15
Saqib Majeed (PAK); Amer Islam (PAK)	0	0
Choi Sang-bum (KOR); Shon Jin-hwan (KOR)	2	1
2	Razif Sidek (MAL); Jalani Sidek (MAL)	15	15

Quarterfinals
Ng Liang Hua (HKG); Chan Wing Kit (HKG)	9	3
3/4	Tian Bingyi (CHN); Li Yongbo (CHN)	15	15
Pramote Teerawiwatana (THA); Siripong Siripool (THA)	15	4	7
2	Razif Sidek (MAL); Jalani Sidek (MAL)	9	15	15

Semifinals
3/4	Tian Bingyi (CHN); Li Yongbo (CHN)	15	18
2	Razif Sidek (MAL); Jalani Sidek (MAL)	5	15
