= Sepak takraw at the 1990 Asian Games – Men's regu =

Men's regu at the 1990 Asian Games
- Venue: Fengtai Gymnasium
- Date: 30 September – 3 October 1990
- Nations: 8

Medalists
gold medal	Malaysia
silver medal	Thailand
bronze medal	Singapore

The men's regu sepak takraw competition at the 1990 Asian Games in Beijing was held from 30 September to 3 October at the Fengtai Gymnasium.

== Results ==
=== Preliminary round ===
==== Group A ====
Pos	Team	Pld	W	L	SF	SA	SD	Pts	Qualification
1	Thailand	3	3	0	6	0	+6	6	Semifinals
2	Brunei	3	2	1	4	2	+2	4	Semifinals
3	China	3	1	2	2	4	−2	2	
4	South Korea	3	0	3	0	6	−6	0	

Date		Score		Set 1	Set 2	Set 3
30 Sep	Thailand	2–0	Brunei	15–1	15–4	
30 Sep	South Korea	0–2	China	10–15	6–15	
30 Sep	Thailand	2–0	China	15–4	15–6	
30 Sep	Brunei	2–0	South Korea	15–2	15–10	
01 Oct	Thailand	2–0	South Korea	15–4	15–7	
01 Oct	China	0–2	Brunei	9–15	7–15	

==== Group B ====
Pos	Team	Pld	W	L	SF	SA	SD	Pts	Qualification
1	Malaysia	3	3	0	6	0	+6	6	Semifinals
2	Singapore	3	2	1	4	3	+1	4	Semifinals
3	Laos	3	1	2	3	4	−1	2	
4	Japan	3	0	3	0	6	−6	0	

Date		Score		Set 1	Set 2	Set 3
30 Sep	Malaysia	2–0	Laos	15–6	15–4	
30 Sep	Japan	0–2	Singapore	4–15	5–15	
30 Sep	Malaysia	2–0	Singapore	15–7	18–13	
30 Sep	Laos	2–0	Japan	15–0	15–1	
01 Oct	Malaysia	2–0	Japan	15–5	15–4	
01 Oct	Singapore	2–1	Laos	15–7	10–15	15–5

=== Knockout round ===
Semifinals
2 October
Thailand	2
Singapore	0
2 October
Malaysia	2
Brunei	0

Final
3 October
Thailand	0
Malaysia	2
Bronze medal match
3 October
Singapore	2
Brunei	1

==== Semifinals ====
Date		Score		Set 1	Set 2	Set 3
02 Oct	Thailand	2–0	Singapore	15–4	15–6	
02 Oct	Malaysia	2–0	Brunei	15–3	15–4	

==== Bronze medal match ====
Date		Score		Set 1	Set 2	Set 3
03 Oct	Singapore	2–1	Brunei	15–18	18–15	15–12

==== Final ====
Date		Score		Set 1	Set 2	Set 3
03 Oct	Thailand	0–2	Malaysia	10–15	11–15	
