= Badminton at the 1990 Asian Games – Men's singles =

Men's singles at the 1990 Asian Games
- Venue: Beijing Gymnasium
- Dates: 2–6 October
- Competitors: 20 from 10 nations

Medalists
gold medal	Zhao Jianhua	China
silver medal	Yang Yang	China
bronze medal	Alan Budikusuma	Indonesia
bronze medal	Rashid Sidek	Malaysia

The badminton men's singles tournament at the 1990 Asian Games in Beijing took place from 2 October to 6 October.

== Schedule ==
All times are China Standard Time (UTC+08:00)

Date	Time	Event
Tuesday, 2 October 1990	13:00	1st round
Tuesday, 2 October 1990	13:00	2nd round
Wednesday, 3 October 1990	13:00	Quarterfinals
Friday, 5 October 1990	13:00	Semifinals
Saturday, 6 October 1990	13:00	Final

== Results ==
=== Final ===
Final
1	Yang Yang (CHN)	10	11
3/4	Zhao Jianhua (CHN)	15	15

=== Top half ===
1st round
Foo Kok Keong (MAL)	15	15
Vacharapan Kumthong (THA)	7	12
Chan Wing Kit (HKG)	5	15	15
Duminda Jayakody (SRI)	15	4	2

2nd round
1	Yang Yang (CHN)	15	15
Fumihiko Machida (JPN)	2	2
Lee Kwang-jin (KOR)	15	10	13
Foo Kok Keong (MAL)	7	15	18
3/4	Alan Budikusuma (INA)	15	15
Ri Yong-hwan (PRK)	6	4
Amer Islam (PAK)	10	15	15
Chan Wing Kit (HKG)	15	9	12

Quarterfinals
1	Yang Yang (CHN)	15	18
Foo Kok Keong (MAL)	1	16
3/4	Alan Budikusuma (INA)	15	15
Amer Islam (PAK)	1	3

Semifinals
1	Yang Yang (CHN)	17	15
3/4	Alan Budikusuma (INA)	14	8

=== Bottom half ===
1st round
Sompol Kukasemkij (THA)	15	15
Ali Yar Baig (PAK)	2	12
Chan Kin Ngai (HKG)	14	15	11
Hiroki Eto (JPN)	17	4	15

2nd round
Sompol Kukasemkij (THA)	6	6
Ardy Wiranata (INA)	15	15
Kim Hak-kyun (KOR)	7	8
3/4	Zhao Jianhua (CHN)	15	15
Hiroki Eto (JPN)	10	15	15
Ri Nam-chol (PRK)	15	7	7
Niroshan Wijekoon (SRI)	6	5
2	Rashid Sidek (MAL)	15	15

Quarterfinals
Ardy Wiranata (INA)	10	5
3/4	Zhao Jianhua (CHN)	15	15
Hiroki Eto (JPN)	7	8
2	Rashid Sidek (MAL)	15	15

Semifinals
3/4	Zhao Jianhua (CHN)	15	15
2	Rashid Sidek (MAL)	2	5
