= Malaysia at the 1990 Asian Games =

- IOC code: MAS
- NOC: Olympic Council of Malaysia
- Website: www.olympic.org.my (in English)

in Beijing
- Competitors: 107 in 13 sports
- Medals Ranked 10th: Gold 2 Silver 2 Bronze 4 Total 8

Asian Games appearances (overview)
- 1954; 1958; 1962; 1966; 1970; 1974; 1978; 1982; 1986; 1990; 1994; 1998; 2002; 2006; 2010; 2014; 2018; 2022; 2026

Other related appearances
- North Borneo (1954, 1958, 1962); Sarawak (1962)

Malaysia competed in the 1990 Asian Games in Beijing, China from 22 September to 7 October 1990. Malaysia ended the games at 8 overall medals. Alexander Lee Yu Lung was the head of the delegation.

== Medal summary ==
=== Medals by sport ===
Sport	Gold	Silver	Bronze	Total	Rank
Athletics	0	0	1	1	11
Badminton	0	1	2	3	4
Field hockey	0	0	1	1	5
Sepaktakraw	2	0	0	2	1
Swimming	0	1	0	1	5
Total	2	2	4	8	10

=== Medallists ===
Medal	Name	Sport	Event
Gold	Abdul Malek Shamsuddin; Noor Rani Adnan; Nordin Sabaruddin; Rehan Mohamed Din	Sepaktakraw	Men's regu
Gold	Abdul Malek Shamsuddin; Noor Rani Adnan; Nordin Sabaruddin; Rehan Mohamed Din	Sepaktakraw	Men's team
Silver	Rashid Sidek; Jalani Sidek; Razif Sidek	Badminton	Men's team
Silver	Jeffrey Ong	Swimming	Men's 1500 metres freestyle
Bronze	Josephine Mary; Rabia Abd Salam; Sajaraturdur Hamzah; Shanti Govindasamy	Athletics	Women's 4 × 400 metres relay
Bronze	Rashid Sidek	Badminton	Men's singles
Bronze	Jalani Sidek; Razif Sidek	Badminton	Men's doubles
Bronze	Malaysia national field hockey team	Field hockey	Men's tournament

== Athletics ==
Key

- Note–Ranks given for track events are within the athlete's heat only
- Q = Qualified for the next round
- q = Qualified for the next round as a fastest loser or, in field events, by position without achieving the qualifying target
- NR = National record
- N/A = Round not applicable for the event
- Bye = Athlete not required to compete in round

Women
Track event

Athlete	Event	Final	
Athlete	Event	Time	Rank
Josephine Mary; Rabia Abd Salam; Sajaraturdur Hamzah; Shanti Govindasamy	4 × 400 m relay	3:38.52	3rd place, bronze medalist(s)

== Badminton ==
Athlete	Event	Final	
Athlete	Event	Opposition Score	Rank
Rashid Sidek	Men's singles		3rd place, bronze medalist(s)
Jalani Sidek; Razif Sidek	Men's doubles		3rd place, bronze medalist(s)
Rashid Sidek; Jalani Sidek; Razif Sidek	Men's team	China (CHN); L	2nd place, silver medalist(s)

== Field hockey ==
=== Men's tournament ===
Ranked 3rd in final standings

== Football ==
=== Men's tournament ===
Group B

Team	Pts	Pld	W	D	L	GF	GA	GD
Iran	4	2	2	0	0	5	1	+4
North Korea	1	2	0	1	1	1	2	−1
Malaysia	1	2	0	1	1	0	3	−3

Qualified for the quarterfinals

24 September 1990

Iran	3 – 0	Malaysia

26 September 1990

North Korea	0 – 0	Malaysia

Ranked 12th in final standings

== Sepaktakraw ==
Athletes	Event	Preliminary round		Semifinal	Final	Rank
Athletes	Event	Opposition Score	Rank	Opposition Score	Opposition Score	Rank
Abdul Malek Shamsuddin; Noor Rani Adnan; Nordin Sabaruddin; Rehan Mohamed Din	Men's regu	Laos; W 15–6, 15–4 Singapore; W 15–7, 18–13; Japan; W 15–5, 15–4	1 Q	Brunei; W 15–3, 15–4	Thailand; W 15–10, 15–11	1st place, gold medalist(s)

Men's team

Rank	Team	Pld	W	L	SF	SA	Pts
1st place, gold medalist(s)	Malaysia	4	4	0	11	1	8
2nd place, silver medalist(s)	Thailand	4	3	1	10	2	6
3rd place, bronze medalist(s)	Singapore	4	2	2	6	6	4
4	China	4	1	3	2	10	2
5	Brunei	4	0	4	1	11	0

Date		Score		Regu 1	Regu 2	Regu 3
24 Sep	China	0–3	Malaysia	0–2	0–2	0–2
25 Sep	Malaysia	3–0	Singapore			
27 Sep	Malaysia	3–0	Brunei	2–0	2–0	2–0
28 Sep	Thailand	1–2	Malaysia	1–2	2–0	1–2

Ranked 1st in final standings

== Swimming ==
Men

Athlete	Event	Final	
Athlete	Event	Time	Rank
Jeffrey Ong	1500 m freestyle	15:46.90	2nd place, silver medalist(s)
