= Badminton at the 1990 Asian Games =

- Venue: Beijing Gymnasium
- Dates: 28 September – 6 October
- Competitors: 101 from 10 nations

Badminton was contested at the 1990 Asian Games in Beijing, China from 28 September to 6 October. Singles, doubles, and team events were contested for both men and women. Mixed doubles were also contested.

The competition was held at the Beijing Gymnasium in Beijing, China.

== Medalists ==
| Event | Gold | Silver | Bronze |
|---|---|---|---|
| Men's singles | Zhao Jianhua; China | Yang Yang; China | Alan Budikusuma; Indonesia |
| Men's singles | Zhao Jianhua; China | Yang Yang; China | Rashid Sidek; Malaysia |
| Men's doubles | China; Tian Bingyi; Li Yongbo | South Korea; Park Joo-bong; Kim Moon-soo | Indonesia; Eddy Hartono; Rudy Gunawan |
| Men's doubles | China; Tian Bingyi; Li Yongbo | South Korea; Park Joo-bong; Kim Moon-soo | Malaysia; Razif Sidek; Jalani Sidek |
| Men's team | China; Huang Zhanzhong; Li Yongbo; Tian Bingyi; Wu Wenkai; Xiong Guobao; Yang Yang; Zhao Jianhua; Zheng Yumin | Malaysia; Cheah Soon Kit; Foo Kok Keong; Kwan Yoke Meng; Jalani Sidek; Rashid Sidek; Razif Sidek; Soo Beng Kiang | South Korea; Ahn Jae-chang; Choi Sang-bum; Kim Hak-kyun; Kim Moon-soo; Lee Kwang-jin; Park Joo-bong; Shon Jin-hwan; Sung Han-kook |
| Men's team | China; Huang Zhanzhong; Li Yongbo; Tian Bingyi; Wu Wenkai; Xiong Guobao; Yang Yang; Zhao Jianhua; Zheng Yumin | Malaysia; Cheah Soon Kit; Foo Kok Keong; Kwan Yoke Meng; Jalani Sidek; Rashid Sidek; Razif Sidek; Soo Beng Kiang | Indonesia; Alan Budikusuma; Rudy Gunawan; Eddy Hartono; Richard Mainaky; Aryono Miranat; Joko Suprianto; Hermawan Susanto; Ardy Wiranata |
| Women's singles | Tang Jiuhong; China | Lee Young-suk; South Korea | Susi Susanti; Indonesia |
| Women's singles | Tang Jiuhong; China | Lee Young-suk; South Korea | Huang Hua; China |
| Women's doubles | China; Guan Weizhen; Nong Qunhua | South Korea; Chung So-young; Gil Young-ah | Indonesia; Verawaty Fadjrin; Lili Tampi |
| Women's doubles | China; Guan Weizhen; Nong Qunhua | South Korea; Chung So-young; Gil Young-ah | China; Yao Fen; Lai Caiqin |
| Women's team | China; Guan Weizhen; Huang Hua; Lai Caiqin; Nong Qunhua; Shi Fangjing; Tang Jiuhong; Yao Fen; Zhou Lei | Indonesia; Verawaty Fadjrin; Sarwendah Kusumawardhani; Lilik Sudarwati; Erma Sulistianingsih; Susi Susanti; Lili Tampi; Rosiana Tendean; Minarti Timur | Japan; Kimiko Jinnai; Kazue Kanai; Tomomi Matsuo; Aiko Miyamura; Hisako Mizui; Hisako Mori; Kyoko Sasage |
| Women's team | China; Guan Weizhen; Huang Hua; Lai Caiqin; Nong Qunhua; Shi Fangjing; Tang Jiuhong; Yao Fen; Zhou Lei | Indonesia; Verawaty Fadjrin; Sarwendah Kusumawardhani; Lilik Sudarwati; Erma Sulistianingsih; Susi Susanti; Lili Tampi; Rosiana Tendean; Minarti Timur | South Korea; Chung Myung-hee; Chung So-young; Gil Young-ah; Hwang Hye-young; Lee Heung-soon; Lee Jung-mi; Lee Young-suk; Shim Eun-jung |
| Mixed doubles | South Korea; Park Joo-bong; Chung Myung-hee | Indonesia; Eddy Hartono; Verawaty Fadjrin | Indonesia; Rudy Gunawan; Rosiana Tendean |
| Mixed doubles | South Korea; Park Joo-bong; Chung Myung-hee | Indonesia; Eddy Hartono; Verawaty Fadjrin | China; Zheng Yumin; Shi Fangjing |

== Medal table ==
| Rank | Nation | Gold | Silver | Bronze | Total |
|---|---|---|---|---|---|
| 1 | China (CHN) | 6 | 1 | 3 | 10 |
| 2 | South Korea (KOR) | 1 | 3 | 2 | 6 |
| 3 | Indonesia (INA) | 0 | 2 | 6 | 8 |
| 4 | Malaysia (MAL) | 0 | 1 | 2 | 3 |
| 5 | Japan (JPN) | 0 | 0 | 1 | 1 |
| Totals (5 entries) | | 7 | 7 | 14 | 28 |

== Participating nations ==
A total of 101 athletes from 10 nations competed in badminton at the 1990 Asian Games:

- China (16)
- Hong Kong (8)
- Indonesia (16)
- Japan (12)
- Malaysia (7)
- North Korea (6)
- Pakistan (6)
- South Korea (16)
- Sri Lanka (2)
- Thailand (12)
