= Boxing at the 1990 Asian Games =

Boxing competitions

- Venue: Beijing Institute of Physical Education
- Dates: 25 September – 3 October 1990

The Boxing Tournament at the 1990 Asian Games was held in Beijing Institute of Physical Education, Beijing, China from September 25 to October 3, 1990.

South Korea finished first in medal table by winning five gold medals in the 12 boxing events. Thailand was second with two gold medals, China, Pakistan, Philippines, Indonesia and Syria won one gold medal each.

== Medalists ==
Event	Gold	Silver	Bronze
Light flyweight (48 kg)	Yang Suk-jin; South Korea	Chatchai Sasakul; Thailand	Seigi Ichikado; Japan
Light flyweight (48 kg)	Yang Suk-jin; South Korea	Chatchai Sasakul; Thailand	Elias Recaido; Philippines
Flyweight (51 kg)	Lee Chang-hwan; South Korea	Muhammad Latif; Pakistan	Vichairachanon Khadpo; Thailand
Flyweight (51 kg)	Lee Chang-hwan; South Korea	Muhammad Latif; Pakistan	None awarded
Bantamweight (54 kg)	Roberto Jalnaiz; Philippines	Hwang Kyung-sup; South Korea	Franky Mamuaya; Indonesia
Bantamweight (54 kg)	Roberto Jalnaiz; Philippines	Hwang Kyung-sup; South Korea	Tseyen-Oidovyn Tserennyam; Mongolia
Featherweight (57 kg)	Raiman Boonthom; Thailand	Jin Myung-dol; South Korea	Sandagsürengiin Erdenebat; Mongolia
Featherweight (57 kg)	Raiman Boonthom; Thailand	Jin Myung-dol; South Korea	Zaigham Maseel; Pakistan
Lightweight (60 kg)	Lee Jae-kwon; South Korea	Yu Chuan; China	Vongkot Chinda; Laos
Lightweight (60 kg)	Lee Jae-kwon; South Korea	Yu Chuan; China	Leopoldo Cantancio; Philippines
Light welterweight (63.5 kg)	Ahmad Mayez Khanji; Syria	Kunihiro Miura; Japan	Nyamaagiin Altankhuyag; Mongolia
Light welterweight (63.5 kg)	Ahmad Mayez Khanji; Syria	Kunihiro Miura; Japan	Arlo Chavez; Philippines
Welterweight (67 kg)	Chainarong Kanha; Thailand	Liu Lijun; China	Chun Jin-chul; South Korea
Welterweight (67 kg)	Chainarong Kanha; Thailand	Liu Lijun; China	Chitra Bahadur Gurung; Nepal
Light middleweight (71 kg)	Abrar Hussain; Pakistan	Wang Yawei; China	Hendrik Simangunsong; Indonesia
Light middleweight (71 kg)	Abrar Hussain; Pakistan	Wang Yawei; China	Gopal Dewang; India
Middleweight (75 kg)	Pino Bahari; Indonesia	Bandiin Altangerel; Mongolia	Liu Xinjun; China
Middleweight (75 kg)	Pino Bahari; Indonesia	Bandiin Altangerel; Mongolia	Siamak Varzideh; Iran
Light heavyweight (81 kg)	Bai Chongguang; China	Ali Asghar Kazemi; Iran	Hong Ki-ho; South Korea
Light heavyweight (81 kg)	Bai Chongguang; China	Ali Asghar Kazemi; Iran	Asghar Ali Changezi; Pakistan
Heavyweight (91 kg)	Chae Sung-bae; South Korea	Wang Weixiong; China	Damdinbazaryn Ganzorig; Mongolia
Heavyweight (91 kg)	Chae Sung-bae; South Korea	Wang Weixiong; China	Muhammad Sahib; Pakistan
Super heavyweight (+91 kg)	Baik Hyun-man; South Korea	Zhao Deling; China	Iraj Kiarostami; Iran
Super heavyweight (+91 kg)	Baik Hyun-man; South Korea	Zhao Deling; China	Dildar Ahmed; Pakistan

== Medal table ==
Rank	Nation	Gold	Silver	Bronze	Total
1	South Korea (KOR)	5	2	2	9
2	Thailand (THA)	2	1	1	4
3	China (CHN)	1	5	1	7
4	Pakistan (PAK)	1	1	4	6
5	Philippines (PHI)	1	0	3	4
6	Indonesia (INA)	1	0	2	3
7	Syria (SYR)	1	0	0	1
8	Mongolia (MGL)	0	1	4	5
9	Iran (IRN)	0	1	2	3
10	Japan (JPN)	0	1	1	2
11	India (IND)	0	0	1	1
11	Laos (LAO)	0	0	1	1
11	Nepal (NEP)	0	0	1	1
Totals (13 entries)		12	12	23	47
