= Sepak takraw at the 1990 Asian Games – Men's team regu =

Men's team regu at the 1990 Asian Games
- Venue: Fengtai Gymnasium
- Date: 24–28 September 1990
- Nations: 5

Medalists
gold medal	Malaysia
silver medal	Thailand
bronze medal	Singapore

The men's team sepak takraw competition at the 1990 Asian Games in Beijing was held from 24 September to 28 September at the Fengtai Gymnasium.

A total of five teams participated in this event.

Malaysia won the gold medal after winning all four matches, Thailand finished second with 3–1 record. Malaysia beat Thailand 2–1 in the last group match to secure the gold medal. Malaysia won first and third Regu both of them 2–1 while Thailand only won the second Regu 2–0.

Singapore won the bronze medal after beating two other teams in the competition, China and Brunei. China also beat Brunei in the last match of the competition 2–1 to finish 4th.

== Results ==
Pos	Team	Pld	W	L	MF	MA	MD	Pts
1	Malaysia	4	4	0	11	1	+10	8
2	Thailand	4	3	1	10	2	+8	6
3	Singapore	4	2	2	6	6	0	4
4	China	4	1	3	2	10	−8	2
5	Brunei	4	0	4	1	11	−10	0

Date		Score		Regu 1			Regu 2			Regu 3		
Date		Score		Set 1	Set 2	Set 3	Set 1	Set 2	Set 3	Set 1	Set 2	Set 3
24 Sep	China	0–3	Malaysia	0–2			0–2			0–2		
24 Sep	Singapore	3–0	Brunei	2–0			2–1			2–0		
24 Sep	Singapore	3–0	Brunei	15–10	15–6		8–15	15–7	15–0	15–10	15–3	
25 Sep	Malaysia	3–0	Singapore									
25 Sep	Thailand	3–0	China	2–0			2–0			2–0		
26 Sep	Thailand	3–0	Brunei	2–0			2–0			2–0		
26 Sep	China	0–3	Singapore									
27 Sep	Brunei	0–3	Malaysia	0–2			0–2			0–2		
27 Sep	Thailand	3–0	Singapore	2–0			2–0			2–0		
28 Sep	Thailand	1–2	Malaysia	1–2			2–0			1–2		
28 Sep	Thailand	1–2	Malaysia	15–9	12–15	7–15	15–5	15–11		13–18	15–11	15–18
28 Sep	Brunei	1–2	China									
