= Indonesia at the 1990 Asian Games =

- IOC code: INA
- NOC: Indonesian Olympic Committee
- Website: www.nocindonesia.or.id (in English)

in Beijing
- Medals Ranked 7th: Gold 3 Silver 6 Bronze 21 Total 30

Asian Games appearances (overview)
- 1951; 1954; 1958; 1962; 1966; 1970; 1974; 1978; 1982; 1986; 1990; 1994; 1998; 2002; 2006; 2010; 2014; 2018; 2022; 2026

Indonesia participated in the 1990 Asian Games held in Beijing, China from September 22, 1990 to October 7, 1990. The country was ranked 7th in the medal tally with 3 gold medals, 6 silver medals and 21 bronze medals; a total of 30 medals.

== Medal summary ==
=== Medal table ===
Sport	Gold	Silver	Bronze	Total
Tennis	2	1	4	7
Boxing	1	0	2	3
Badminton	0	2	6	8
Canoeing	0	1	1	2
Fencing	0	1	1	2
Weightlifting	0	1	1	2
Swimming	0	0	3	3
Cycling	0	0	1	1
Judo	0	0	1	1
Rowing	0	0	1	1
Total	3	6	21	30

=== Medalists ===
Medal	Name	Sport	Event
Gold	Pino Bahari	Boxing	Men's Middleweight (75 kg)
Gold	Yayuk Basuki; Suzanna Wibowo	Tennis	Women's doubles
Gold	Hary Suharyadi; Yayuk Basuki	Tennis	Mixed doubles
Silver	Eddy Hartono; Verawaty Fadjrin	Badminton	Mixed doubles
Silver	Verawaty Fadjrin; Sarwendah Kusumawardhani; Lilik Sudarwati; Erma Sulistianingsih; Susi Susanti; Lili Tampi; Rosiana Tendean; Minarti Timur	Badminton	Women's team
Silver	Anisi	Canoeing	Men's K-1 1000 m
Silver	Silvia Koeswandi	Fencing	Women's individual épée
Silver	Yayuk Basuki; Irawati Moerid; Lukky Tedjamukti; Suzanna Wibowo	Tennis	Women's team
Silver	Patmawati Abdul Hamid	Weightlifting	Women's −60 kg
Bronze	Alan Budikusuma	Badminton	Men's singles
Bronze	Eddy Hartono; Rudy Gunawan	Badminton	Men's doubles
Bronze	Alan Budikusuma; Rudy Gunawan; Eddy Hartono; Richard Mainaky; Aryono Miranat; Joko Suprianto; Hermawan Susanto; Ardy Wiranata	Badminton	Men's team
Bronze	Susi Susanti	Badminton	Women's singles
Bronze	Verawaty Fadjrin; Lili Tampi	Badminton	Women's doubles
Bronze	Rudy Gunawan; Rosiana Tendean	Badminton	Mixed doubles
Bronze	Franky Mamuaya	Boxing	Men's −54 kg
Bronze	Hendrik Simangunsong	Boxing	Men's −71 kg
Bronze	Abdul Razak; Anisi	Canoeing	Men's K-2 1000 m
Bronze	Nurhayati	Cycling	Women's 1 km time trial
Bronze	Silvia Koeswandi; Rini Poniman; Sri Ayanti Satimin; Sumiani	Fencing	Women's Team épée
Bronze	Pujawati Utama	Judo	Women's −72 kg
Bronze	Juliati; Nelliewatiy; Tuah; Tutie	Rowing	Women's Lightweight coxless four
Bronze	Richard Sam Bera	Swimming	Men's 100 m freestyle
Bronze	Wirmandi Sugriat	Swimming	Men's 200 m breaststroke
Bronze	Khim Tjia Fei; Meitri Widya Pangestika; Yen Yen Gunawan; Elfira Rosa Nasution	Swimming	Women's 4×100 m freestyle relay
Bronze	Bonit Wiryawan; Daniel Heryanto	Tennis	Men's doubles
Bronze	Daniel Heryanto; Hary Suharyadi; Benny Wijaya; Bonit Wiryawan	Tennis	Men's team
Bronze	Lukky Tedjamukti; Irawati Moerid	Tennis	Women's doubles
Bronze	Bonit Wiryawan; Suzanna Wibowo	Tennis	Mixed doubles
Bronze	Ponco Imbarwati	Weightlifting	Women's −48 kg
