= Zhao Jianhua =

Chinese badminton player

Zhao Jianhua 赵剑华
Personal information
- Born: 21 April 1965 (age 61) Nantong, Jiangsu, China
- Height: 1.83 m (6 ft 0 in)

Sport
- Country: China
- Sport: Badminton
- Handedness: Left

Men's singles
- Highest ranking: 1
Medal record
Men's badminton
Representing China
World Championships
Gold medal – first place	1991 Copenhagen	Men's singles
Bronze medal – third place	1987 Beijing	Men's singles
World Cup
Gold medal – first place	1987 Kuala Lumpur	Men's singles
Silver medal – second place	1988 Bangkok	Men's singles
Silver medal – second place	1990 Bandung–Jakarta	Men's singles
Silver medal – second place	1991 Macau	Men's singles
Bronze medal – third place	1986 Jakarta	Men's singles
Bronze medal – third place	1989 Guangzhou	Men's singles
Bronze medal – third place	1992 Guangzhou	Men's singles
Sudirman Cup
Bronze medal – third place	1991 Copenhagen	Mixed team
Bronze medal – third place	1993 Birmingham	Mixed team
Thomas Cup
Gold medal – first place	1988 Kuala Lumpur	Men's team
Gold medal – first place	1990 Tokyo	Men's team
Bronze medal – third place	1992 Kuala Lumpur	Men's team
Asian Games
Gold medal – first place	1986 Seoul	Men's singles
Gold medal – first place	1990 Beijing	Men's singles
Gold medal – first place	1990 Beijing	Men's team
Silver medal – second place	1986 Seoul	Men's team
Asian Championships
Gold medal – first place	1985 Kuala Lumpur	Men's singles
Gold medal – first place	1983 Calcutta	Men's team
Gold medal – first place	1985 Kuala Lumpur	Men's team
Gold medal – first place	1987 Semarang	Men's team
Gold medal – first place	1989 Shanghai	Men's team
Bronze medal – third place	1983 Calcutta	Men's singles
Bronze medal – third place	1983 Calcutta	Men's doubles

Zhao Jianhua (Chinese: 赵剑华) (born 21 April 1965) is a Chinese former badminton player who competed internationally from the mid-1980s to the early 1990s. He was admired for his speed and power as well as for his deception and technique.

== Career ==
Zhao won the 1991 IBF World Championships in singles, beating Alan Budikusuma in the final. He also won a bronze medal at the 1987 IBF World Championships. He is a two-time winner of the prestigious All England singles title (1985, 1990), and won the quadrennial Asian Games title on both occasions (1986, 1990) that he contested it, defeating his fellow countryman Yang Yang in the final on each occasion. He was a member of China's world champion Thomas Cup (men's international) teams in 1988, and 1990.

Zhao Jianhua competed in badminton at the 1992 Summer Olympics in men's singles and was seeded No. 1. In the first round he had a bye, and in the second round he defeated Darren Hall from Great Britain. In the round of 16 Zhao beat Deepankar Bhattacharya from India and in quarterfinals he lost to Hermawan Susanto from Indonesia 15–2, 14–17, 17–14. He is currently the head coach of Guangxi Province Badminton Club.

== Achievements ==
=== World Championships ===
Men's singles
Year	Venue	Opponent	Score	Result
1987	Capital Indoor Stadium, Beijing, China	(Denmark) Morten Frost	12–15, 11–15	Bronze
1991	Brøndby Arena, Copenhagen, Denmark	(Indonesia) Alan Budikusuma	18–13, 15–4	Gold

=== World Cup ===
Men's singles
Year	Venue	Opponent	Score	Result
1986	Istora Senayan, Jakarta, Indonesia	(Indonesia) Icuk Sugiarto	14–18, 10–15	Bronze
1987	Stadium Negara, Kuala Lumpur, Malaysia	(China) Yang Yang	6–15, 15–2, 15–12	Gold
1988	National Stadium, Bangkok, Thailand	(China) Yang Yang	5–15, 6–15	Silver
1989	Guangzhou Gymnasium, Guangzhou, China	(China) Yang Yang	9–15, 15–7, 13–18	Bronze
1990	Istora Senayan, Jakarta, Indonesia	(China) Wu Wenkai	6–15, 7–15	Silver
1991	Macau Forum, Macau	(Indonesia) Ardy Wiranata	15–12, 7–15, 10–15	Silver
1992	Guangdong Gymnasium, Guangzhou, China	(Indonesia) Hermawan Susanto	15–13, 4–15, 2–15	Bronze

=== Asian Games ===
Men's singles
Year	Venue	Opponent	Score	Result
1986	Olympic Gymnastics Arena, Seoul, South Korea	(China) Yang Yang	15–9, 17–16	Gold
1990	Beijing Gymnasium, Beijing, China	(China) Yang Yang	15–10, 15–11	Gold

=== Asian Championships ===
Men's singles
Year	Venue	Opponent	Score	Result
1983	Shanghai, China	(Indonesia) Eddy Kurniawan	15–18, 15–6, 15–18	Bronze
1985	Stadium Negara, Kuala Lumpur, Malaysia	(China) Yang Yang	15–10, 5–15, 15–6	Gold

=== IBF World Grand Prix (9 titles, 8 runners-up) ===
The World Badminton Grand Prix sanctioned by International Badminton Federation (IBF) from 1983 to 2006.

Men's singles
Year	Tournament	Opponent	Score	Result
1985	Japan Open	(China) Han Jian	15–10, 15–3	(gold) Winner
1985	Swedish Open	(China) Han Jian	14–18, 15–1, 15–18	(silver) Runner-up
1985	All England Open	(Denmark) Morten Frost	6–15, 15–10, 18–15	(gold) Winner
1986	Malaysia Open	(Malaysia) Misbun Sidek	15–10, 15–13	(gold) Winner
1987	Japan Open	(China) Xiong Guobao	15–12, 13–15, 10–15	(silver) Runner-up
1987	China Open	(China) Xiong Guobao	15–10, 8–15, 15–6	(gold) Winner
1987	Thailand Open	(Indonesia) Eddy Kurniawan	15–10, 15–10	(gold) Winner
1988	China Open	(Indonesia) Ardy Wiranata	15–10, 15–8	(gold) Winner
1989	Malaysia Open	(China) Xiong Guobao	12–15, 3–15	(silver) Runner-up
1989	Denmark Open	(Denmark) Morten Frost	12–15, 13–15	(silver) Runner-up
1990	All England Open	(Indonesia) Joko Suprianto	15–4, 15–1	(gold) Winner
1990	Singapore Open	(Malaysia) Foo Kok Keong	15–8, 10–15, 9–15	(silver) Runner-up
1991	China Open	(Indonesia) Alan Budikusuma	15–7, 5–15, 12–15	(silver) Runner-up
1991	World Grand Prix Finals	(China) Wu Wenkai	15–9, 5–15, 15–7	(gold) Winner
1992	All England Open	(China) Liu Jun	13–15, 13–15	(silver) Runner-up
1992	Japan Open	(Indonesia) Ardy Wiranata	15–11, 7–15, 10–15	(silver) Runner-up
1992	Singapore Open	(Indonesia) Ardy Wiranata	15–3, 15–1	(gold) Winner

=== IBF International (1 title) ===
Men's singles
Year	Tournament	Opponent	Score	Result
1984	Scottish Open	(Denmark) Jens Peter Nierhoff	15–5, 15–7	(gold) Winner

=== Invitation Tournament (1 title) ===
Men's singles
Year	Tournament	Opponent	Score	Result
1989	Konica Cup	(Indonesia) Eddy Kurniawan	15–11, 15–2	(gold) Winner
