= Nur Hisham Adam =

Singaporean sepak takraw player

Personal information
- Nationality: Singaporean
- Born: 24 April 1968 (age 58) Singapore

Sport
- Country: Singapore
- Sport: sepak takraw
Medal record
Representing Singapore
Men's sepak takraw
Asian Games
Bronze medal – third place	1990 Beijing	Regu
Bronze medal – third place	1990 Beijing	Team regu
Bronze medal – third place	1994 Hiroshima	Regu
Bronze medal – third place	1998 Bangkok	Team regu
Bronze medal – third place	2002 Busan	Regu

Nur Hisham Adam (born 24 April 1968) is a former Singaporean male sepak takraw player. He represented Singapore in 4 editions of the Asian Games and won five bronze medals.
