= Mongolia at the 1990 Asian Games =

- IOC code: MGL
- NOC: Mongolian National Olympic Committee

in Beijing
- Medals Ranked 12th: Gold 1 Silver 7 Bronze 9 Total 17

Asian Games appearances (overview)
- 1974; 1978; 1982; 1986; 1990; 1994; 1998; 2002; 2006; 2010; 2014; 2018; 2022; 2026

Mongolia participated in the 11th Asian Games, officially known as the XI Asiad held in Beijing, China September 22, 1990 to October 7. It won 1 gold, 7 silver and 9 bronze medals.

== Medal summary ==
=== Medals by sport ===
Sport	Gold	Silver	Bronze	Total
Boxing		1	4	5
Judo		1	3	4
Wrestling	1	4	1	6
Cycling		1	1	2
Total	1	7	9	17

=== Medalists ===
Medal	Athlete	Sport	Event
Gold	Puntsagiin Sükhbat	Wrestling	Men's freestyle 82 kg
Silver	Arslangiin Tsedensodnom	Wrestling	Men's freestyle 57 kg
Silver	Lodoin Enkhbayar	Wrestling	Men's freestyle 74 kg
Silver	Boldyn Javkhlantögs	Wrestling	Men's freestyle 100 kg
Silver	Aduuchiin Baatarkhüü	Wrestling	Men's freestyle 130 kg
Silver	Bandiin Altangerel	Boxing	Men's 75 kg
Silver	Badmaanyambuugiin Bat-Erdene	Judo	Men's + 95 kg
Bronze	Tserenbaataryn Khosbayar	Wrestling	Men's freestyle 48 kg
Bronze	Tseyen-Oidovyn Tserennyam	Boxing	Men's 54 kg
Bronze	Sandagsürengiin Erdenebat	Boxing	Men's 57 kg
Bronze	Nyamaagiin Altankhuyag	Boxing	Men's 63.5 kg
Bronze	Damdinbazaryn Ganzorig	Boxing	Men's 91 kg
Bronze	Badmaanyambuugiin Bat-Erdene	Judo	Men's openweight
Bronze	Dashgombyn Battulga	Judo	Men's 60 kg
Bronze	Artagiin Buyanjargal	Judo	Men's 71 kg
