= Tian Bingyi =

Chinese badminton player

Tian Bingyi 田秉毅
Personal information
- Born: 30 July 1963 (age 63) Wuhan, Hubei, China

Sport
- Country: China
- Sport: Badminton
- Event: Men's doubles
Medal record
Men's badminton
Representing China
Olympic Games
Bronze medal – third place	1992 Barcelona	Men's doubles
World Championships
Gold medal – first place	1987 Beijing	Men's doubles
Gold medal – first place	1989 Jakarta	Men's doubles
Silver medal – second place	1985 Calgary	Men's doubles
Bronze medal – third place	1991 Copenhagen	Men's doubles
World Cup
Gold medal – first place	1988 Bangkok	Men's doubles
Silver medal – second place	1984 Jakarta	Men's doubles
Silver medal – second place	1985 Jakarta	Men's doubles
Silver medal – second place	1987 Kuala Lumpur	Men's doubles
Silver medal – second place	1989 Guangzhou	Men's doubles
Bronze medal – third place	1990 Bandung/Jakarta	Men's doubles
Bronze medal – third place	1991 Macau	Men's doubles
Thomas Cup
Gold medal – first place	1986 Jakarta	Men's team
Gold medal – first place	1988 Kuala Lumpur	Men's team
Gold medal – first place	1990 Tokyo	Men's team
Silver medal – second place	1984 Kuala Lumpur	Men's team
Bronze medal – third place	1992 Kuala Lumpur	Men's team
Sudirman Cup
Bronze medal – third place	1989 Jakarta	Mixed team
Bronze medal – third place	1991 Copenhagan	Mixed team
Asian Games
Gold medal – first place	1990 Beijing	Men's doubles
Gold medal – first place	1990 Beijing	Men's team
Silver medal – second place	1986 Seoul	Men's doubles
Silver medal – second place	1986 Seoul	Men's team
Asian Championships
Gold medal – first place	1987 Semarang	Men's team
Gold medal – first place	1989 Shanghai	Men's team

Tian Bingyi (Chinese: 田秉毅; pinyin: Tián Bǐngyì; born 30 July 1963) is a Chinese former badminton player. Though he played some singles internationally early in his career, he soon specialised in men's doubles.

== Career ==
From the mid-1980s to the early 1990s, Tian and his regular partner Li Yongbo won numerous top tier international titles. They were contemporaries and rivals of the famous Korean team of Park Joo-bong and Kim Moon-soo, largely dividing the world's biggest championships between them for about eight seasons. Among the many tournaments around the world that Tian and Li captured were consecutive World Championships in 1987 and 1989, the prestigious All-England Championship in 1987, 1988, and 1991, and five Danish Opens between 1984 and 1991. They also played on Chinese Thomas Cup teams that won consecutive world titles in 1986, 1988, and 1990. Late in their partnership they won a bronze medal in men's doubles at the 1992 Olympic Games in Barcelona.

Tian is married to Zhou Jihong, a diver and Olympic champion.

== Achievements ==
=== Olympic Games ===
Men's doubles
Year	Venue	Partner	Opponent	Score	Result
1988	Seoul National University Gymnasium, Seoul, South Korea (exhibition)	(China) Li Yongbo	(South Korea) Lee Gwang-jin (South Korea) Lee Sang-bok	15–11, 15–7	Gold
1992	Pavelló de la Mar Bella, Barcelona, Spain	(China) Li Yongbo	(Indonesia) Rudy Gunawan (Indonesia) Eddy Hartono	9–15, 8–15	Bronze

=== World Championships ===
Men's doubles
Year	Venue	Partner	Opponent	Score	Result
1985	Olympic Saddledome, Calgary, Canada	(China) Li Yongbo	(South Korea) Kim Moon-soo (South Korea) Park Joo-bong	15–5, 7–15, 9–15	Silver
1987	Capital Indoor Stadium, Beijing, China	(China) Li Yongbo	(Malaysia) Jalani Sidek (Malaysia) Razif Sidek	15–2, 8–15, 15–9	Gold
1989	Senayan Sports Complex, Jakarta, Indonesia	(China) Li Yongbo	(China) Chen Hongyong (China) Chen Kang	15–3, 15–12	Gold
1991	Brøndby Arena, Copenhagen, Denmark	(China) Li Yongbo	(Denmark) Jon Holst-Christensen (Denmark) Thomas Lund	7–15, 9–15	Bronze

=== World Cup ===
Men's doubles
Year	Venue	Partner	Opponent	Score	Result
1984	Senayan Sports Complex, Jakarta, Indonesia	(China) Li Yongbo	(Indonesia) Hariamanto Kartono (Indonesia) Liem Swie King	8–15, 1–15	Silver
1985	Senayan Sports Complex, Jakarta, Indonesia	(China) Li Yongbo	(Indonesia) Hariamanto Kartono (Indonesia) Liem Swie King	11–15, 15–11, 11–15	Silver
1987	Stadium Negara, Kuala Lumpur, Malaysia	(China) Li Yongbo	(South Korea) Kim Moon-soo (South Korea) Park Joo-bong	6–15, 15–6, 11–15	Silver
1988	National Stadium, Bangkok, Thailand	(China) Li Yongbo	(Malaysia) Jalani Sidek (Malaysia) Razif Sidek	Walkover	Gold
1989	Guangzhou Gymnasium, Guangzhou, China	(China) Li Yongbo	(South Korea) Kim Moon-soo (South Korea) Park Joo-bong	10–15, 11–15	Silver
1990	Istora Senayan, Jakarta, Indonesia	(China) Li Yongbo	(Malaysia) Jalani Sidek (Malaysia) Razif Sidek	12–15, 3–15	Bronze
1991	Macau Forum, Macau	(China) Li Yongbo	(South Korea) Kim Moon-soo (South Korea) Park Joo-bong	16–17, 14–17	Bronze

=== Asian Games ===
Men's doubles
Year	Venue	Partner	Opponent	Score	Result
1986	Olympic Gymnastics Arena, Seoul, South Korea	(China) Li Yongbo	(South Korea) Kim Moon-soo (South Korea) Park Joo-bong	8–15, 10–15	Silver
1990	Beijing Gymnasium, Beijing, China	(China) Li Yongbo	(South Korea) Kim Moon-soo (South Korea) Park Joo-bong	15–8, 15–4	Gold

=== IBF World Grand Prix (26 titles, 9 runners-up) ===
The World Badminton Grand Prix sanctioned by International Badminton Federation (IBF) since from 1983 to 2006.

Men's doubles
Year	Tournament	Partner	Opponent	Score	Result
1984	Denmark Open	(China) Li Yongbo	(Denmark) Morten Frost (Denmark) Jens Peter Nierhoff	15–7, 15–2	(gold) Winner
1985	German Open	(China) Zhang Xinguang	(China) Li Yongbo (China) Ding Qiqing	5–15, 15–12, 7–15	(silver) Runner-up
1985	Denmark Open	(China) Li Yongbo	(Malaysia) Razif Sidek (Malaysia) Jalani Sidek	17–14, 15–8	(gold) Winner
1985	Malaysian Masters	(China) Li Yongbo	(Malaysia) Razif Sidek (Malaysia) Jalani Sidek	15–10, 15–7	(gold) Winner
1985	Indonesia Open	(China) Li Yongbo	(Indonesia) Liem Swie King (Indonesia) Hariamanto Kartono	5–15, 10–15	(silver) Runner-up
1986	China Open	(China) Li Yongbo	(China) Huang Zhen (China) Chen Hongyong	15–6, 15–8	(gold) Winner
1986	Denmark Open	(China) Li Yongbo	(England) Dipak Tailor (England) Martin Dew	15–9, 15–3	(gold) Winner
1986	English Masters	(China) Li Yongbo	(England) Dipak Tailor (England) Martin Dew	11–15, 15–5, 15–11	(gold) Winner
1987	Scandinavian Open	(China) Li Yongbo	(England) Dipak Tailor (England) Martin Dew	15–2, 15–11	(gold) Winner
1987	All England Open	(China) Li Yongbo	(Indonesia) Bobby Ertanto (Indonesia) Rudy Heryanto	15–9, 15–8	(gold) Winner
1987	China Open	(China) Li Yongbo	(China) Zhang Qiang (China) Zhou Jincan	15–10, 15–6	(gold) Winner
1987	Thailand Open	(China) Li Yongbo	(Indonesia) Eddy Hartono (Indonesia) Liem Swie King	15–13, 15–11	(gold) Winner
1987	Malaysia Open	(China) Li Yongbo	(Malaysia) Razif Sidek (Malaysia) Jalani Sidek	Walkover	(silver) Runner-up
1987	World Grand Prix Finals	(China) Li Yongbo	(China) Zhang Qiang (China) Zhou Jincan	15–9, 15–4	(gold) Winner
1988	Japan Open	(China) Li Yongbo	(South Korea) Park Joo-bong (South Korea) Kim Moon-soo	18–15, 15–4	(gold) Winner
1988	Swedish Open	(China) Li Yongbo	(China) Chen Kang (China) Chen Hongyong	Walkover	(gold) Winner
1988	All England Open	(China) Li Yongbo	(Malaysia) Razif Sidek (Malaysia) Jalani Sidek	15–6, 15–7	(gold) Winner
1988	Thailand Open	(China) Li Yongbo	(Malaysia) Razif Sidek (Malaysia) Rashid Sidek	15–3, 15–5	(gold) Winner
1988	China Open	(China) Li Yongbo	(China) Chen Kang (China) Chen Hongyong	13–15, 15–8, 15–3	(gold) Winner
1988	English Masters	(China) Li Yongbo	(Malaysia) Razif Sidek (Malaysia) Jalani Sidek	15–11, 15–4	(gold) Winner
1988	Denmark Open	(China) Li Yongbo	(Malaysia) Razif Sidek (Malaysia) Jalani Sidek	15–6, 8–15, 15–4	(gold) Winner
1988	Malaysia Open	(China) Li Yongbo	(Malaysia) Razif Sidek (Malaysia) Jalani Sidek	15–12, 15–12	(gold) Winner
1989	Swedish Open	(China) Li Yongbo	(South Korea) Park Joo-bong (South Korea) Lee Sang-bok	17–14, 15–2	(gold) Winner
1989	French Open	(China) Li Yongbo	(China) Huang Zhen (China) He Xiangyang	15–3, 15–6	(gold) Winner
1989	Denmark Open	(China) Li Yongbo	(Malaysia) Razif Sidek (Malaysia) Jalani Sidek	15–10, 15–11	(gold) Winner
1989	World Grand Prix Finals	(China) Li Yongbo	(Malaysia) Razif Sidek (Malaysia) Jalani Sidek	9–15, 5–15	(silver) Runner-up
1990	Japan Open	(China) Li Yongbo	(South Korea) Park Joo-bong (South Korea) Kim Moon-soo	15–3, 16–17, 13–18	(silver) Runner-up
1990	Swedish Open	(China) Li Yongbo	(Malaysia) Razif Sidek (Malaysia) Jalani Sidek	15–7, 15–9	(gold) Winner
1990	All England Open	(China) Li Yongbo	(South Korea) Park Joo-bong (South Korea) Kim Moon-soo	14–17, 9–15	(silver) Runner-up
1990	Singapore Open	(China) Li Yongbo	(Indonesia) Eddy Hartono (Indonesia) Rudy Gunawan	4–15, 8–15	(silver) Runner-up
1990	Denmark Open	(China) Li Yongbo	(Denmark) Jesper Knudsen (Denmark) Thomas Stuer-Lauridsen	15–8, 15–6	(gold) Winner
1991	All England Open	(China) Li Yongbo	(South Korea) Park Joo-bong (South Korea) Kim Moon-soo	12–15, 15–7, 15–8	(gold) Winner
1991	China Open	(China) Li Yongbo	(China) Huang Zhanzhong (China) Zheng Yumin	15–8, 15–10	(gold) Winner
1992	Korea Open	(China) Li Yongbo	(South Korea) Park Joo-bong (South Korea) Kim Moon-soo	10–15, 10–15	(silver) Runner-up
1992	Japan Open	(China) Li Yongbo	(China) Chen Kang (China) Chen Hongyong	15–10, 8–15, 10–15	(silver) Runner-up
