= 1989 Singapore Open (badminton) =

Unofficial individual 1989 Asian Badminton Championships

Tournament details
- Dates: 21 February 1989– 26 February 1989
- Edition: 43rd
- Total prize money: US$42,000
- Venue: Singapore Badminton Hall
- Location: Geylang, Singapore

Champions
- Men's singles: (China) Zhao Jianhua
- Women's singles: (China) Han Aiping
- Men's doubles: (Malaysia) Jalani Sidek (Malaysia) Razif Sidek
- Women's doubles: (China) Guan Weizhen (China) Lin Ying

The 1989 Singapore Open, also known as the Konica Cup - The Invitational Asian Badminton Championships, took place from 21 ~ 26 February 1989 at the Singapore Badminton Hall in Singapore. It was the third and final edition of this event before it returned to the open invitation format of 1973. This was also the last time that the tournament was held at the Singapore Badminton Hall before the organiser move the event to the newly built Singapore Indoor Stadium at Kallang in 1990. The total prize money on offer was US$42,000.

== Final results ==
Category	Winners	Runners-up	Score
Men's singles	(China) Zhao Jianhua	(Indonesia) Eddy Kurniawan	15–11, 15–7
Women's singles	(China) Han Aiping	(South Korea) Lee Young-suk	11–0, 11–5
Men's doubles	(Malaysia) Jalani Sidek & Razif Sidek	(Indonesia) Rudy Gunawan & Eddy Hartono	15–12, 15–8
Women's doubles	(China) Guan Weizhen & Lin Ying	(South Korea) Chung Myung-hee & Hwang Hye-young	15–6, 15–8
