= 1990 Asian Games medal table =

- Commemorative Coin XI Asian Games Beijing 1990 in Chinese and English.
- Location: Beijing, China

Highlights
- Most gold medals: China 183
- Most total medals: China 341
- Medalling NOCs: 25

The 1990 Asian Games medal table is a list of nations ranked by the medals won by their athletes during the multi-sport event, being held in Beijing, China from September 22 to October 7, 1990. The National Olympic Committees are ranked by number of gold medals first, with number of silver then bronze medals acting as the rank decider in the event of equal standing. Other alternative methods of ranking include listing by total medals. China set a new record by becoming the first nation in the history of the Asian Games to cross the 100-gold medal mark and the 300-total medal mark in one edition.

== Medal table ==
* Host nation (China)

Rank	NOC	Gold	Silver	Bronze	Total
1	China (CHN)*	183	107	51	341
2	South Korea (KOR)	54	54	73	181
3	Japan (JPN)	38	60	76	174
4	North Korea (PRK)	12	31	39	82
5	Iran (IRN)	4	6	8	18
6	Pakistan (PAK)	4	1	7	12
7	Indonesia (INA)	3	6	21	30
8	Qatar (QAT)	3	2	1	6
9	Thailand (THA)	2	7	8	17
10	Malaysia (MAS)	2	2	4	8
11	India (IND)	1	8	14	23
12	Mongolia (MGL)	1	7	9	17
13	Philippines (PHI)	1	2	7	10
14	Syria (SYR)	1	0	2	3
15	Oman (OMA)	1	0	0	1
16	Chinese Taipei (TPE)	0	10	21	31
17	Hong Kong (HKG)	0	2	5	7
18	Sri Lanka (SRI)	0	2	1	3
19	Singapore (SIN)	0	1	4	5
20	Bangladesh (BAN)	0	1	0	1
21	Myanmar (MYA)	0	0	2	2
22	Laos (LAO)	0	0	1	1
22	Macau (MAC)	0	0	1	1
22	Nepal (NEP)	0	0	1	1
22	Saudi Arabia (KSA)	0	0	1	1
Totals (25 entries)		310	309	357	976
