= Alan Budikusuma =

Indonesian badminton player (born 1968)

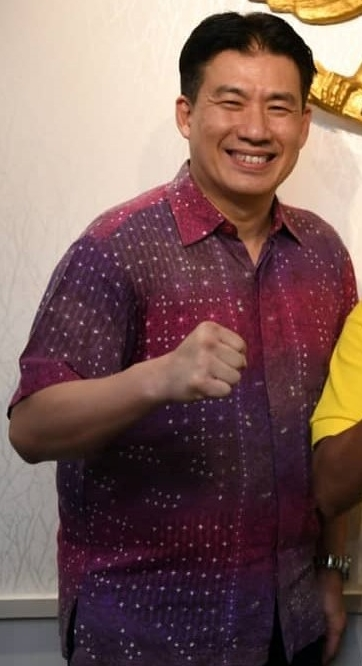

Personal information
- Born: Goei Djien Phang; 29 March 1968 (age 58) Surabaya, East Java, Indonesia
- Height: 1.78 m (5 ft 10 in)
- Weight: 71 kg (157 lb)
- Spouse: Susi Susanti (m. 1997)

Sport
- Country: Indonesia
- Sport: Badminton
- Handedness: Right
- Coached by: Tang Xianhu

Men's singles
- Highest ranking: 1
- BWF profile
Medal record
Men's badminton
Representing Indonesia
Olympic Games
Gold medal – first place	1992 Barcelona	Men's singles
World Championships
Silver medal – second place	1991 Copenhagen	Men's singles
World Cup
Gold medal – first place	1993 New Delhi	Men's singles
Silver medal – second place	1995 Jakarta	Men's singles
Bronze medal – third place	1987 Kuala Lumpur	Men's singles
Sudirman Cup
Silver medal – second place	1991 Copenhagen	Mixed team
Silver medal – second place	1993 Birmingham	Mixed team
Silver medal – second place	1995 Lausanne	Mixed team
Bronze medal – third place	1997 Glasgow	Mixed team
Thomas Cup
Gold medal – first place	1996 Hong Kong	Men's team
Silver medal – second place	1992 Kuala Lumpur	Men's team
Bronze medal – third place	1988 Kuala Lumpur	Men's team
Bronze medal – third place	1990 Tokyo	Men's team
Asian Games
Bronze medal – third place	1990 Beijing	Men's singles
Bronze medal – third place	1990 Beijing	Men's team
Asian Championships
Gold medal – first place	1993 Hong Kong	Men's team
Silver medal – second place	1987 Semarang	Men's team
Silver medal – second place	1989 Shanghai	Men's team
SEA Games
Gold medal – first place	1987 Jakarta	Men's team
Silver medal – second place	1989 Kuala Lumpur	Men's team
Silver medal – second place	1991 Manila	Men's team

Chinese name
- Traditional Chinese: 魏仁芳
- Simplified Chinese: 魏仁芳
- Hanyu Pinyin: Wèi Rén Fāng
- Hokkien POJ: Guī Jîn Phang

Alexander Alan Budikusuma Wiratama, born Goei Djien Phang (Chinese: 魏仁芳; born 29 March 1968) is an Indonesian former badminton player who excelled at the world level from the late 1980s to the mid-1990s. He is the first indonesian player to win Olympic gold medal in 1992.

== Career ==
In 1991 he was runner-up to China's Zhao Jianhua at the IBF World Championships in Copenhagen. He won the 1992 Olympic men's singles gold medal at Barcelona, defeating compatriot Ardy Wiranata in the final. This achievement, together with a gold medal for his then fiancé Susi Susanti, was historical for Indonesia winning the first Olympic golden medals in 50 years history of the country. A crowd estimated at 500,000 to one million Indonesians lined the streets of Jakarta when Susi Susanti and Alan Budikusuma came home in August 1992 and received a two-hour parade. Governor of West Java Yogie S. M. awarded him an honorary West Java citizenship following his victory.

Among his titles, all in singles, are the Thailand Open (1989, 1991), China Open (1991), German Open (1992), Indonesian Open (1993), World Cup (1993), and Malaysian Open (1995). Budikusuma was a member of world champion Indonesian Thomas Cup teams in 1996.

== Personal life ==
He is married to Susi Susanti (王蓮香), a women's badminton Olympic gold medalist (also in 1992). Together they have three children Laurencia Averina, born 1999, Albertus Edward, born in 2000 and Sebastianus Frederick, born in 2003. Alan and Susi have a badminton club in North Jakarta. Alan Budi has a younger brother named Yohan Hadikusuma who is also a badminton player but representing Hong Kong.

== Awards and nominations ==
Award	Year	Category	Result	Ref.
Government of Indonesia Awards	1992	Tanda Kehormatan Bintang Jasa Utama	Honored	

== Achievements ==
=== Olympic Games ===
Men's singles
Year	Venue	Opponent	Score	Result	Ref.
1992	Pavelló de la Mar Bella, Barcelona, Spain	(Indonesia) Ardy Wiranata	15–12, 18–13	Gold	

=== World Championships ===
Men's singles
Year	Venue	Opponent	Score	Result	Ref.
1991	Brøndby Arena, Copenhagen, Denmark	(China) Zhao Jianhua	13–18, 4–15	Silver	

=== World Cup ===
Men's singles
Year	Venue	Opponent	Score	Result	Ref.
1987	Stadium Negara, Kuala Lumpur, Malaysia	(China) Zhao Jianhua	13–18, 4–15	Bronze	
1993	Indira Gandhi Arena, New Delhi, India	(Indonesia) Joko Suprianto	15–8, 17–16	Gold	
1995	Istora Senayan, Jakarta, Indonesia	(Indonesia) Joko Suprianto	7–15, 15–11, 8–15	Silver	

=== Asian Games ===
Men's singles
Year	Venue	Opponent	Score	Result	Ref.
1990	Beijing Gymnasium, Beijing, China	(China) Yang Yang	14–17, 8–15	Bronze	

=== IBF World Grand Prix (8 titles, 11 runners-up) ===
The World Badminton Grand Prix sanctioned by International Badminton Federation (IBF) from 1983 to 2006.

Men's singles
Year	Tournament	Opponent	Score	Result	Ref.
1989	Swedish Open	(Denmark) Morten Frost	4–15, 4–15	(silver) Runner-up	
1989	Thailand Open	(Thailand) Sompol Kukasemkij	17–14, 15–8	(gold) Winner	
1989	Dutch Open	(Indonesia) Eddy Kurniawan	15–7, 15–12	(gold) Winner	
1990	Thailand Open	(Thailand) Sompol Kukasemkij	11–15, 13–18	(silver) Runner-up	
1991	Thailand Open	(Thailand) Sompol Kukasemkij	14–17, 15–1, 15–10	(gold) Winner	
1991	China Open	(China) Zhao Jianhua	7–15, 15–5, 15–12	(gold) Winner	
1992	Korea Open	(China) Wu Wenkai	7–15, 11–15	(silver) Runner-up	
1992	German Open	(Indonesia) Joko Suprianto	15–11, 15–2	(gold) Winner	
1992	Thailand Open	(Indonesia) Joko Suprianto	10–15, 15–10, 10–15	(silver) Runner-up	
1992	World Grand Prix Finals	(Malaysia) Rashid Sidek	9–15, 15–5, 7–15	(silver) Runner-up	
1993	Indonesia Open	(Indonesia) Fung Permadi	15–10, 14–17, 15–4	(gold) Winner	
1993	German Open	(Denmark) Thomas Stuer-Lauridsen	5–15, 2–15	(silver) Runner-up	
1993	Dutch Open	(Denmark) Poul-Erik Høyer Larsen	15–11, 5–15, 11–15	(silver) Runner-up	
1994	Denmark Open	(Denmark) Poul-Erik Høyer Larsen	18–17, 4–15, 10–15	(silver) Runner-up	
1994	China Open	(Indonesia) Ardy Wiranata	15–10, 15–12	(gold) Winner	
1994	World Grand Prix Finals	(Indonesia) Ardy Wiranata	15–9, 7–15, 5–15	(silver) Runner-up	
1995	Malaysia Open	(Indonesia) Ardy Wiranata	15–5, 15–8	(gold) Winner	
1995	Hong Kong Open	(Indonesia) Hariyanto Arbi	18–13, 13–15, 4–15	(silver) Runner-up	
1997	Vietnam Open	(China) Chen Gang	6–15, 15–9, 3–15	(silver) Runner-up	

IBF Grand Prix tournament
IBF Grand Prix Finals tournament
