= Kim Moon-soo (badminton) =

South Korean badminton player (born 1963)

Personal information
- Born: 29 December 1963 (age 62) Busan, South Korea

Sport
- Country: South Korea
- Sport: Badminton
- Handedness: Left
- Event: Men's doubles

Men's doubles
- BWF profile
Medal record
Representing South Korea
Men's badminton
Olympic Games
Gold medal – first place	1992 Barcelona	Men's doubles
World Championships
Gold medal – first place	1985 Calgary	Men's doubles
Gold medal – first place	1991 Copenhagen	Men's doubles
Bronze medal – third place	1987 Beijing	Men's doubles
World Cup
Gold medal – first place	1983 Kuala Lumpur	Men's doubles
Gold medal – first place	1987 Kuala Lumpur	Men's doubles
Gold medal – first place	1989 Guangzhou	Men's doubles
Silver medal – second place	1989 Guangzhou	Mixed doubles
Silver medal – second place	1991 Macau	Men's doubles
Bronze medal – third place	1986 Jakarta	Men's doubles
Sudirman Cup
Gold medal – first place	1991 Copenhagen	Mixed team
Gold medal – first place	1993 Birmingham	Mixed team
Silver medal – second place	1989 Jakarta	Mixed team
Thomas Cup
Bronze medal – third place	1992 Kuala Lumpur	Men's team
Asian Games
Gold medal – first place	1986 Seoul	Men's doubles
Gold medal – first place	1986 Seoul	Men's team
Silver medal – second place	1990 Beijing	Men's doubles
Bronze medal – third place	1990 Beijing	Men's team
Asian Championships
Gold medal – first place	1985 Kuala Lumpur	Men's doubles
Gold medal – first place	1991 Kuala Lumpur	Men's doubles
Bronze medal – third place	1987 Semarang	Men's team
Bronze medal – third place	1989 Shanghai	Men's team

- Kim Moon-soo
- Hangul: 김문수
- Hanja: 金文秀
- RR: Gim Munsu
- MR: Kim Munsu

Kim Moon-soo (born 29 December 1963) is a former badminton player from South Korea active from the early 1980s through the early-1990s.

== Career ==
He has won 2 titles in the World Badminton Championships in men's doubles. He also won a gold medal at the Summer Olympics and 3 All England Open Badminton Championships in men's doubles. All of these were gained with fellow countryman Park Joo-bong, his regular partner during most his badminton career. In 1988, Kim married fellow 1985 World Champion Yoo Sang Hee after Yoo retired from international badminton. Kim himself retired in 1993, after contributing to Korea's Sudirman Cup victory. Kim competed for Korea in badminton at the 1992 Summer Olympics in men's doubles with partner Park Joo-bong. They won the gold medal defeating Eddy Hartono and Rudy Gunawan from Indonesia 15–11, 15–7. Kim was inducted into the Badminton Hall of Fame in 2002

== Achievements ==
=== Olympic Games ===
Men's doubles
Year	Venue	Partner	Opponent	Score	Result
1992	Pavelló de la Mar Bella, Barcelona, Spain	(South Korea) Park Joo-bong	(Indonesia) Rudy Gunawan (Indonesia) Eddy Hartono	15–11, 15–7	Gold

=== World Championships ===
Men's doubles
Year	Venue	Partner	Opponent	Score	Result
1985	Olympic Saddledome, Calgary, Canada	(South Korea) Park Joo-bong	(China) Li Yongbo (China) Tian Bingyi	5–15, 15–7, 15–9	Gold
1987	Capital Indoor Stadium, Beijing, China	(South Korea) Park Joo-bong	(Malaysia) Razif Sidek (Malaysia) Jalani Sidek	16–17, 4–15	Bronze
1991	Brøndby Arena, Copenhagen, Denmark	(South Korea) Park Joo-bong	(Denmark) Jon Holst-Christensen (Denmark) Thomas Lund	15–4, 15–6	Gold

=== World Cup ===
Men's doubles
Year	Venue	Partner	Opponent	Score	Result
1983	Stadium Negara, Kuala Lumpur, Malaysia	(South Korea) Park Joo-bong	(Indonesia) Christian Hadinata (Indonesia) Bobby Ertanto	15–6, 15–11	Gold
1986	Senayan Sports Complex, Jakarta, Indonesia	(South Korea) Park Joo-bong	(Indonesia) Liem Swie King (Indonesia) Bobby Ertanto	11–15, 8–15	Bronze
1987	Stadium Negara, Kuala Lumpur, Malaysia	(South Korea) Park Joo-bong	(China) Li Yongbo (China) Tian Bingyi	15–6, 6–15, 15–11	Gold
1989	Guangzhou Gymnasium, Guangzhou, China	(South Korea) Park Joo-bong	(China) Li Yongbo (China) Tian Bingyi	15–10, 15–11	Gold
1991	Macau Forum, Macau, China	(South Korea) Park Joo-bong	(Malaysia) Razif Sidek (Malaysia) Jalani Sidek	18–15, 11–15, 2–15	Silver

Year	Venue	Partner	Opponent	Score	Result
1989	Guangzhou Gymnasium, Guangzhou, China	(South Korea) Chung So-young	(South Korea) Park Joo-bong (South Korea) Chung Myung-hee	5–15, 9–15	Silver

=== Asian Games ===
Men's doubles
Year	Venue	Partner	Opponent	Score	Result
1986	Olympic Gymnastics Arena, Seoul, South Korea	(South Korea) Park Joo-bong	(China) Li Yongbo (China) Tian Bingyi	15–8, 15–10	Gold
1990	Beijing Gymnasium, Beijing, China	(South Korea) Park Joo-bong	(China) Li Yongbo (China) Tian Bingyi	8–15, 4–15	Silver

=== Asian Championships ===
Men's doubles
Year	Venue	Partner	Opponent	Score	Result
1985	Stadium Negara, Kuala Lumpur, Malaysia	(South Korea) Park Joo-bong	(Malaysia) Razif Sidek (Malaysia) Jalani Sidek	15–5, 8–15, 15–2	Gold
1991	Stadium Negara, Kuala Lumpur, Malaysia	(South Korea) Park Joo-bong	(China) Chen Kang (China) Chen Hongyong	15–12, 15–10	Gold

=== IBF World Grand Prix (23 titles, 4 runners-up) ===
The World Badminton Grand Prix sanctioned by International Badminton Federation (IBF) from 1983 to 2006.

Men's doubles
Year	Tournament	Partner	Opponent	Score	Result
1984	Swedish Open	(South Korea) Park Joo-bong	(Sweden) Thomas Kihlström (Sweden) Stefan Karlsson	15–8, 10–15, 15–8	(gold) Winner
1984	Malaysia Open	(South Korea) Lee Deuk-choon	(Malaysia) Razif Sidek (Malaysia) Jalani Sidek	15–6, 12–15, 15–10	(gold) Winner
1985	Japan Open	(South Korea) Park Joo-bong	(Indonesia) Christian Hadinata (Indonesia) Hadibowo Susanto	17–16, 15–2	(gold) Winner
1985	All England Open	(South Korea) Park Joo-bong	(Denmark) Michael Kjeldsen (Denmark) Mark Christiansen	7–15, 15–10, 15–9	(gold) Winner
1985	India Open	(South Korea) Park Joo-bong	(England) Steve Baddeley (England) Nick Yates	15–3, 15–5	(gold) Winner
1986	German Open	(South Korea) Park Joo-bong	(Denmark) Jesper Helledie (Denmark) Steen Fladberg	15–8, 15–12	(gold) Winner
1986	All England Open	(South Korea) Park Joo-bong	(Malaysia) Razif Sidek (Malaysia) Jalani Sidek	15–2, 15–11	(gold) Winner
1987	French Open	(South Korea) Lee Deuk-choon	(Indonesia) Hadibowo Susanto (Indonesia) Rudy Heryanto	15–0, 17–14	(gold) Winner
1988	Japan Open	(South Korea) Park Joo-bong	(China) Li Yongbo (China) Tian Bingyi	15–18, 4–15	(silver) Runner-up
1989	Malaysia Open	(South Korea) Park Joo-bong	(Malaysia) Razif Sidek (Malaysia) Jalani Sidek	15–12, 10–15, 15–7	(gold) Winner
1989	Thailand Open	(South Korea) Park Joo-bong	(Malaysia) Razif Sidek (Malaysia) Cheah Soon Kit	15–11, 15–3	(gold) Winner
1990	Japan Open	(South Korea) Park Joo-bong	(China) Li Yongbo (China) Tian Bingyi	3–15, 17–16, 18–13	(gold) Winner
1990	All England Open	(South Korea) Park Joo-bong	(China) Li Yongbo (China) Tian Bingyi	17–14, 15–9	(gold) Winner
1990	French Open	(South Korea) Park Joo-bong	(Malaysia) Razif Sidek (Malaysia) Jalani Sidek	15–3, 15–10	(gold) Winner
1990	Thailand Open	(South Korea) Park Joo-bong	(China) Chen Kang (China) Chen Hongyong	15–7, 15–7	(gold) Winner
1990	Malaysia Open	(South Korea) Park Joo-bong	(Malaysia) Razif Sidek (Malaysia) Jalani Sidek	15–4, 13–15, 15–4	(gold) Winner
1991	All England Open	(South Korea) Park Joo-bong	(China) Li Yongbo (China) Tian Bingyi	15–12, 7–15, 8–15	(silver) Runner-up
1991	Japan Open	(South Korea) Park Joo-bong	(Malaysia) Razif Sidek (Malaysia) Jalani Sidek	15–4, retired	(gold) Winner
1991	Malaysia Open	(South Korea) Park Joo-bong	(Malaysia) Razif Sidek (Malaysia) Jalani Sidek	15–8, 15–11	(gold) Winner
1991	Singapore Open	(South Korea) Park Joo-bong	(China) Huang Zhanzhong (China) Zheng Yumin	15–2, 15–4	(gold) Winner
1991	Indonesia Open	(South Korea) Park Joo-bong	(Indonesia) Rudy Gunawan (Indonesia) Eddy Hartono	18–15, 15–13	(gold) Winner
1991	Denmark Open	(South Korea) Park Joo-bong	(China) Huang Zhanzhong (China) Zheng Yumin	10–15, 9–15	(silver) Runner-up
1992	Russia Open	(South Korea) Park Joo-bong	(South Korea) Kim Hyung-jin (South Korea) Park Sung-woo	15–4, 15–5	(gold) Winner
1992	Korea Open	(South Korea) Park Joo-bong	(China) Li Yongbo (China) Tian Bingyi	15–10, 15–10	(gold) Winner

Mixed doubles
Year	Tournament	Partner	Opponent	Score	Result
1985	India Open	(South Korea) Kang Haeng-suk	(England) Steve Baddeley (England) Gillian Gowers	15–11, 9–15, 12–15	(silver) Runner-up
1989	Swiss Open	(South Korea) Chung So-young	(England) Nick Ponting (England) Cheryl Johnson	18–15, 15–4	(gold) Winner
1990	French Open	(South Korea) Chung So-young	(South Korea) Park Joo-bong (South Korea) Chung Myung-hee	15–4, 15–6	(gold) Winner

=== IBF International (1 title) ===
Men's doubles
Year	Tournament	Partner	Opponent	Score	Result
1993	Iran Fajr International	(South Korea) Park Joo-bong	(Iran) Hameed Nasimi (Iran) Mansour Shakoori	15–6, 15–5	(gold) Winner
