= Li Yongbo =

Chinese badminton player

Li Yongbo 李永波
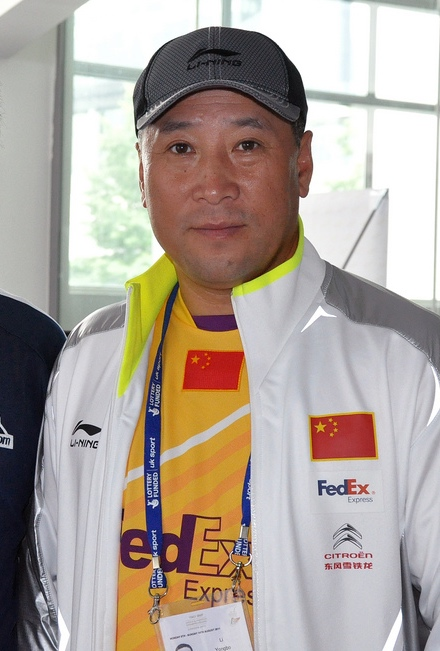

Personal information
- Born: 18 September 1962 (age 64) Dalian, Liaoning, China

Sport
- Country: China
- Sport: Badminton
- Event: Men's doubles
Medal record
Men's badminton
Representing China
Olympic Games
Bronze medal – third place	1992 Barcelona	Men's doubles
World Championships
Gold medal – first place	1987 Beijing	Men's doubles
Gold medal – first place	1989 Jakarta	Men's doubles
Silver medal – second place	1985 Calgary	Men's doubles
Bronze medal – third place	1991 Copenhagen	Men's doubles
World Cup
Gold medal – first place	1988 Bangkok	Men's doubles
Silver medal – second place	1984 Jakarta	Men's doubles
Silver medal – second place	1985 Jakarta	Men's doubles
Silver medal – second place	1987 Kuala Lumpur	Men's doubles
Silver medal – second place	1989 Guangzhou	Men's doubles
Bronze medal – third place	1990 Bandung/Jakarta	Men's doubles
Bronze medal – third place	1991 Macau	Men's doubles
Thomas Cup
Gold medal – first place	1986 Jakarta	Men's team
Gold medal – first place	1988 Kuala Lumpur	Men's team
Gold medal – first place	1990 Tokyo	Men's team
Bronze medal – third place	1992 Kuala Lumpur	Men's team
Sudirman Cup
Bronze medal – third place	1989 Jakarta	Mixed team
Bronze medal – third place	1991 Copenhagan	Mixed team
Asian Games
Gold medal – first place	1990 Beijing	Men's doubles
Gold medal – first place	1990 Beijing	Men's team
Silver medal – second place	1986 Seoul	Men's doubles
Silver medal – second place	1986 Seoul	Men's team
Asian Championships
Gold medal – first place	1987 Semarang	Men's team
Gold medal – first place	1989 Shanghai	Men's team

Li Yongbo (Chinese: 李永波; pinyin: Lǐ Yǒngbō; born 18 September 1962) is a retired Chinese badminton player and the former head coach of China national badminton team.

== Career ==
As a player, Li was a men's doubles specialist noted for his quickness, reflexes, and power. From the mid-1980s to the early 1990s, he shared numerous international titles with his regular partner Tian Bingyi. They were contemporaries and rivals of the famous Korean pair Kim Moon-soo and Park Joo-bong, largely dividing badminton's biggest doubles events between them for about eight seasons. Among many other tournaments around the world Li and Tian captured the (then biennial) World Championships in 1987 and 1989, the historical All-England Championships in 1987, 1988, and 1991, and the Danish Open in 1985, 1987, 1989, 1990, and 1991. They also played on Chinese Thomas Cup (men's international) teams that won consecutive world team titles in 1986, 1988, and 1990. Late in their partnership they won a bronze medal in men's doubles at the 1992 Olympic Games in Barcelona.

As the Chinese badminton women's doubles coach during the 2012 Summer Olympics in London, his players were banned from competition for "tanking" their match against South Korea, who won the match but were also banned similarly (as were the Indonesian women's doubles team). Li has admitted his role in the scandal; insiders say Li used fear tactics and intimidation to a strategic advantage in national and Olympic competition. By losing, his team would have avoided playing another Chinese team.

Following the conclusion of the Rio Olympics, where China won two gold medals, he stood down in 2017.

== Achievements ==
=== Olympic Games ===
Men's doubles
Year	Venue	Partner	Opponent	Score	Result
1988	Seoul National University Gymnasium; Seoul, South Korea (exhibition)	(China) Tian Bingyi	(South Korea) Lee Gwang-jin (South Korea) Lee Sang-bok	15–11, 15–7	Gold
1992	Pavelló de la Mar Bella; Barcelona, Spain	(China) Tian Bingyi	(Indonesia) Rudy Gunawan (Indonesia) Eddy Hartono	9–15, 8–15	Bronze

=== World Championships ===
Men's doubles
Year	Venue	Partner	Opponent	Score	Result
1985	Olympic Saddledome; Calgary, Canada	(China) Tian Bingyi	(South Korea) Kim Moon-soo (South Korea) Park Joo-bong	15–5, 7–15, 9–15	Silver
1987	Capital Indoor Stadium; Beijing, China	(China) Tian Bingyi	(Malaysia) Jalani Sidek (Malaysia) Razif Sidek	15–2, 8–15, 15–9	Gold
1989	Senayan Sports Complex; Jakarta, Indonesia	(China) Tian Bingyi	(China) Chen Hongyong (China) Chen Kang	15–3, 15–12	Gold
1991	Brøndby Arena; Copenhagen, Denmark	(China) Tian Bingyi	(Denmark) Jon Holst-Christensen (Denmark) Thomas Lund	7–15, 9–15	Bronze

=== World Cup ===
Men's doubles
Year	Venue	Partner	Opponent	Score	Result
1984	Senayan Sports Complex; Jakarta, Indonesia	(China) Tian Bingyi	(Indonesia) Hariamanto Kartono (Indonesia) Liem Swie King	8–15, 1–15	Silver
1985	Senayan Sports Complex; Jakarta, Indonesia	(China) Tian Bingyi	(Indonesia) Hariamanto Kartono (Indonesia) Liem Swie King	11–15, 15–11, 11–15	Silver
1987	Stadium Negara; Kuala Lumpur, Malaysia	(China) Tian Bingyi	(South Korea) Kim Moon-soo (South Korea) Park Joo-bong	6–15, 15–6, 11–15	Silver
1988	National Stadium; Bangkok, Thailand	(China) Tian Bingyi	(Malaysia) Jalani Sidek (Malaysia) Razif Sidek	Walkover	Gold
1989	Guangzhou Gymnasium; Guangzhou, China	(China) Tian Bingyi	(South Korea) Kim Moon-soo (South Korea) Park Joo-bong	10–15, 11–15	Silver
1990	Istora Senayan; Jakarta, Indonesia	(China) Tian Bingyi	(Malaysia) Razif Sidek (Malaysia) Jalani Sidek	12–15, 3–15	Bronze
1991	Macau Forum, Macau	(China) Tian Bingyi	(South Korea) Kim Moon-soo (South Korea) Park Joo-bong	16–17, 14–17	Bronze

=== Asian Games ===
Men's doubles
Year	Venue	Partner	Opponent	Score	Result
1986	Olympic Gymnastics Arena; Seoul, South Korea	(China) Tian Bingyi	(South Korea) Kim Moon-soo (South Korea) Park Joo-bong	8–15, 10–15	Silver
1990	Beijing Gymnasium; Beijing, China	(China) Tian Bingyi	(South Korea) Kim Moon-soo (South Korea) Park Joo-bong	15–8, 15–4	Gold

=== IBF World Grand Prix (28 titles, 8 runners-up) ===
The World Badminton Grand Prix sanctioned by International Badminton Federation (IBF) since from 1983 to 2006.

Men's doubles
Year	Tournament	Partner	Opponent	Score	Result
1984	Denmark Open	(China) Tian Bingyi	(Denmark) Morten Frost (Denmark) Jens Peter Nierhoff	15–7, 15–2	(gold) Winner
1985	German Open	(China) Ding Qiqing	(China) Tian Bingyi (China) Zhang Xinguang	15–5, 12–15, 15–7	(gold) Winner.
1985	Denmark Open	(China) Tian Bingyi	(Malaysia) Jalani Sidek (Malaysia) Razif Sidek	17–14, 15–8	(gold) Winner
1985	Swedish Open	(China) Ding Qiqing	(Sweden) Stefan Karlsson (Sweden) Thomas Kihlström	15–12, 14–18, 18–15	(gold) Winner
1985	Malaysian Masters	(China) Tian Bingyi	(Malaysia) Jalani Sidek (Malaysia) Razif Sidek	15–10, 15–7	(gold) Winner
1985	Indonesia Open	(China) Tian Bingyi	(Indonesia) Hariamanto Kartono (Indonesia) Liem Swie King	5–15, 10–15	(silver) Runner-up
1986	China Open	(China) Tian Bingyi	(China) Chen Hongyong (China) Huang Zhen	15–6, 15–8	(gold) Winner
1986	Denmark Open	(China) Tian Bingyi	(England) Martin Dew (England) Dipak Tailor	15–9, 15–3	(gold) Winner
1986	English Masters	(China) Tian Bingyi	(England) Martin Dew (England) Dipak Tailor	11–15, 15–5, 15–11	(gold) Winner
1987	Scandinavian Open	(China) Tian Bingyi	(Denmark) Michael Kjeldsen (Denmark) Jens Peter Nierhoff	15–2, 15–11	(gold) Winner
1987	All England Open	(China) Tian Bingyi	(Indonesia) Bobby Ertanto (Indonesia) Rudy Heryanto	15–9, 15–8	(gold) Winner
1987	China Open	(China) Tian Bingyi	(China) Zhang Qiang (China) Zhou Jincan	15–10, 15–6	(gold) Winner
1987	Thailand Open	(China) Tian Bingyi	(Indonesia) Eddy Hartono (Indonesia) Liem Swie King	15–13, 15–11	(gold) Winner
1987	Malaysia Open	(China) Tian Bingyi	(Malaysia) Jalani Sidek (Malaysia) Razif Sidek	Walkover	(silver) Runner-up
1987	World Grand Prix Finals	(China) Tian Bingyi	(China) Zhang Qiang (China) Zhou Jincan	15–9, 15–4	(gold) Winner
1988	Japan Open	(China) Tian Bingyi	(South Korea) Kim Moon-soo (South Korea) Park Joo-bong	18–15, 15–4	(gold) Winner
1988	Swedish Open	(China) Tian Bingyi	(China) Chen Hongyong (China) Chen Kang	Walkover	(gold) Winner
1988	All England Open	(China) Tian Bingyi	(Malaysia) Jalani Sidek (Malaysia) Razif Sidek	15–6, 15–7	(gold) Winner
1988	Thailand Open	(China) Tian Bingyi	(Malaysia) Rashid Sidek (Malaysia) Razif Sidek	15–3, 15–5	(gold) Winner
1988	China Open	(China) Tian Bingyi	(China) Chen Hongyong (China) Chen Kang	13–15, 15–8, 15–3	(gold) Winner
1988	English Masters	(China) Tian Bingyi	(Malaysia) Jalani Sidek (Malaysia) Razif Sidek	15–11, 15–4	(gold) Winner
1988	Denmark Open	(China) Tian Bingyi	(Malaysia) Jalani Sidek (Malaysia) Razif Sidek	15–6, 8–15, 15–4	(gold) Winner
1988	Malaysia Open	(China) Tian Bingyi	(Malaysia) Jalani Sidek (Malaysia) Razif Sidek	15–12, 15–12	(gold) Winner
1989	Swedish Open	(China) Tian Bingyi	(South Korea) Lee Sang-bok (South Korea) Park Joo-bong	17–14, 15–2	(gold) Winner
1989	French Open	(China) Tian Bingyi	(China) He Xiangyang (China) Huang Zhen	15–3, 15–6	(gold) Winner
1989	Denmark Open	(China) Tian Bingyi	(Malaysia) Jalani Sidek (Malaysia) Razif Sidek	15–10, 15–11	(gold) Winner
1989	World Grand Prix Finals	(China) Tian Bingyi	(Malaysia) Jalani Sidek (Malaysia) Razif Sidek	9–15, 5–15	(silver) Runner-up
1990	Japan Open	(China) Tian Bingyi	(South Korea) Kim Moon-soo (South Korea) Park Joo-bong	15–3, 16–17, 13–18	(silver) Runner-up
1990	Swedish Open	(China) Tian Bingyi	(Malaysia) Jalani Sidek (Malaysia) Razif Sidek	15–7, 15–9	(gold) Winner
1990	All England Open	(China) Tian Bingyi	(South Korea) Kim Moon-soo (South Korea) Park Joo-bong	14–17, 9–15	(silver) Runner-up
1990	Singapore Open	(China) Tian Bingyi	(Indonesia) Rudy Gunawan (Indonesia) Eddy Hartono	4–15, 8–15	(silver) Runner-up
1990	Denmark Open	(China) Tian Bingyi	(Denmark) Jesper Knudsen (Denmark) Thomas Stuer-Lauridsen	15–8, 15–6	(gold) Winner
1991	All England Open	(China) Tian Bingyi	(South Korea) Kim Moon-soo (South Korea) Park Joo-bong	12–15, 15–7, 15–8	(gold) Winner
1991	China Open	(China) Tian Bingyi	(China) Huang Zhanzhong (China) Zheng Yumin	15–8, 15–10	(gold) Winner
1992	Korea Open	(China) Tian Bingyi	(South Korea) Kim Moon-soo (South Korea) Park Joo-bong	10–15, 10–15	(silver) Runner-up
1992	Japan Open	(China) Tian Bingyi	(China) Chen Hongyong (China) Chen Kang	15–10, 8–15, 10–15	(silver) Runner-up
