= Haizi Reservoir =

Haizi Reservoir 海子水库
- Location within Beijing Location within China
- Location: on the Ju River
- Coordinates: 40°10′34″N 117°18′40″E
- Type: reservoir
- Basin countries: China
- Built: 1960

The Haizi Reservoir (Chinese: 海子水库), also named Jinhai Lake, is a large reservoir located in the east of Haizi Village in Jinhaihu District (formerly Hanzhuang Township), Pinggu District, Beijing, intercepting the Ju River. It is the fourth largest reservoir in Beijing, and is a Class II water source along with the Miyun Reservoir.

It is called "Haizi Reservoir" because it is located in the south of Dajin Mountain and the north of Haizi Village. In 1988, the Reservoir was renamed "Jinhai Lake" and is still in use today.

== History ==
Haizi Reservoir started construction on 18 November 1959 and was completed in July 1960 with a total storage capacity of 18.5 million cubic meters, which was expanded in 1968 and 1974 and completed on June 8, 1983.

The reservoir was designed by the Beijing Municipal Design Institute (北京市市政设计院), and the Pinggu County Revolutionary Committee established a project headquarters to organize the construction of migrant workers.
