= Eddy Hartono =

Indonesian badminton player (born 1964)

Personal information
- Born: Eddy Hartono Arbie 洪忠中; 19 July 1964 (age 62) Kudus Regency, Central Java, Indonesia
- Height: 1.73 m (5 ft 8 in)

Sport
- Country: Indonesia
- Sport: Badminton
- Handedness: Right
- Event: Men's & mixed doubles

Men's & mixed doubles
- BWF profile
Medal record
Men's badminton
Representing Indonesia
Olympic Games
Silver medal – second place	1992 Barcelona	Men's doubles
World Championships
Silver medal – second place	1989 Jakarta	Mixed doubles
Bronze medal – third place	1989 Jakarta	Men's doubles
World Cup
Gold medal – first place	1986 Bandung–Jakarta	Mixed doubles
Silver medal – second place	1990 Bandung–Jakarta	Men's doubles
Bronze medal – third place	1987 Kuala Lumpur	Men's doubles
Bronze medal – third place	1988 Bangkok	Men's doubles
Bronze medal – third place	1989 Guangzhou	Men's doubles
World Masters Games
Silver medal – second place	2009 Sydney	Men's doubles 45+
World Senior Championships
Gold medal – first place	2007 Taipei	Men's doubles 40+
Gold medal – first place	2013 Ankara	Men's doubles 40+
Bronze medal – third place	2015 Helsingborg	Men's doubles 45+
Bronze medal – third place	2025 Pattaya	Men's doubles 60+
Sudirman Cup
Gold medal – first place	1989 Jakarta	Mixed team
Silver medal – second place	1991 Copenhagen	Mixed team
Thomas Cup
Gold medal – first place	1994 Jakarta	Men's team
Silver medal – second place	1992 Kuala Lumpur	Men's team
Bronze medal – third place	1988 Kuala Lumpur	Men's team
Bronze medal – third place	1990 Nagoya–Tokyo	Men's team
Asian Games
Silver medal – second place	1990 Beijing	Mixed doubles
Bronze medal – third place	1986 Seoul	Men's team
Bronze medal – third place	1990 Beijing	Men's doubles
Bronze medal – third place	1990 Beijing	Men's team
Asian Championships
Silver medal – second place	1987 Semarang	Men's team
SEA Games
Gold medal – first place	1987 Jakarta	Men's doubles
Gold medal – first place	1987 Jakarta	Mixed doubles
Gold medal – first place	1987 Jakarta	Men's team
Gold medal – first place	1989 Kuala Lumpur	Men's doubles
Gold medal – first place	1989 Kuala Lumpur	Mixed doubles
Gold medal – first place	1991 Manila	Men's doubles
Silver medal – second place	1989 Kuala Lumpur	Men's team
Silver medal – second place	1991 Manila	Men's team

Eddy Hartono Arbie (Chinese: 洪忠中; born 19 July 1964) is an Indonesian former badminton player who excelled in the late 1980s and early 1990s. After a brief stint competing in singles, he soon became a doubles specialist noted for his deft racket control and fluent strokes. His two siblings, Hastomo and Hariyanto were world class shuttlers in men's singles.

== Career ==
Hartono affiliated with PB Djarum since 1976. He won the Indonesia junior national championships in 1981, and selected to join national team in 1983. He started his career in national team as singles player, and after two years he became a doubles specialist. In 1987, he teamed-up with Liem Swie King, won the Chinese Taipei, Japan and Indonesia Open's. Hartono shared numerous international men's doubles titles in a relatively brief time period, most of them with Rudy Gunawan, where Hartono played as front player. These included the Indonesia (1989, 1992), Dutch (1989, 1991), Singapore (1990), and Thailand Open (1991). He won the World Badminton Grand Prix (1990), the SEA Games (1991), the prestigious All-England title (1992), and earned a silver medal at the 1992 Olympics in Barcelona, all with Gunawan. Hartono also captured several international mixed doubles titles, and placed second in mixed doubles at the 1989 IBF World Championships with Verawaty Fadjrin.

== Personal life ==
Hartono married Yuliani Jusro on 19 April 1992, and the ceremony was held at the Wisma Karsa Pemuda, Senayan, Jakarta. He is now works as commissioner residential area developers in PT. Duta Paramindo Sejahtera.

== Achievements ==
=== Olympic Games ===
Men's doubles
Year	Venue	Partner	Opponent	Score	Result	Ref.
1992	Pavelló de la Mar Bella, Barcelona, Spain	(Indonesia) Rudy Gunawan	(South Korea) Kim Moon-soo (South Korea) Park Joo-bong	11–15, 7–15	Silver	

=== World Championships ===
Men's doubles
Year	Venue	Partner	Opponent	Score	Result	Ref.
1989	Senayan Sports Complex, Jakarta, Indonesia	(Indonesia) Rudy Gunawan	(China) Chen Hongyong (China) Chen Kang	11–15, 7–15	Bronze	

Mixed doubles
Year	Venue	Partner	Opponent	Score	Result	Ref.
1989	Senayan Sports Complex, Jakarta, Indonesia	(Indonesia) Verawaty Fadjrin	(South Korea) Park Joo-bong (South Korea) Chung Myung-hee	9–15, 9–15	Silver	

=== World Cup ===
Men's doubles
Year	Venue	Partner	Opponent	Score	Result	Ref.
1987	Stadium Negara, Kuala Lumpur, Malaysia	(Indonesia) Liem Swie King	(South Korea) Kim Moon-soo (South Korea) Park Joo-bong	7–15, 18–13, 13–15	Bronze	
1988	National Stadium, Bangkok, Thailand	(Indonesia) Rudy Gunawan	(China) Li Yongbo (China) Tian Bingyi	15–8, 5–15, 11–15	Bronze	
1989	Guangzhou Gymnasium, Guangzhou, China	(Indonesia) Rudy Gunawan	(China) Li Yongbo (China) Tian Bingyi	7–15, 4–15	Bronze	
1990	Istora Senayan, Jakarta, Indonesia	(Indonesia) Rudy Gunawan	(Malaysia) Jalani Sidek (Malaysia) Razif Sidek	17–14, 8–15, 7–15	Silver	

Mixed doubles
Year	Venue	Partner	Opponent	Score	Result	Ref.
1986	Istora Senayan, Jakarta, Indonesia	(Indonesia) Verawaty Fadjrin	(Denmark) Steen Fladberg (England) Gillian Clark	15–8, 17–15	Gold	

=== World Masters Games ===
Men's doubles
Year	Age	Venue	Partner	Opponent	Score	Result	Ref.
2009	45+	Sydney, Australia	(Indonesia) Effendy Widjaja	(Thailand) Chaiyut Nilphang-Nga (Thailand) Nattapol Sanlekanun	Walkover	Silver	

=== World Senior Championships ===
Men's doubles
Year	Age	Venue	Partner	Opponent	Score	Result	Ref.
2007	40+	Taipei Gymnasium; Taipei, Taiwan	(Indonesia) Suganyanto Hadi Wahono	(Malaysia) Wong Wei Choy (Malaysia) Ong Beng Teong		Gold	
2013	40+	Ankara Spor Salunu Stadium; Ankara, Turkey	(Philippines) Rudy Wijaya	(Sweden) Stefan Edvardsson (Sweden) Joacim Fellenius	21–10, 21–15	Gold	
2015	45+	Helsingborg Arena; Helsingborg, Sweden	(Indonesia) Tri Cahyo	(Chinese Taipei) Liu En-horng (Chinese Taipei) Wu Chang-jun	16–21, 15–21	Bronze	
2025	45+	Eastern National Sports Training Centre; Pattaya, Thailand	(Indonesia) Bobby Ertanto	(Thailand) Surachai Makkasasithorn (Thailand) Narong Vanichitsarakul	Walkover	Bronze	

=== Asian Games ===
Men's doubles
Year	Venue	Partner	Opponent	Score	Result	Ref.
1990	Beijing Gymnasium, Beijing, China	(Indonesia) Rudy Gunawan	(South Korea) Kim Moon-soo (South Korea) Park Joo-bong	10–15, 8–15	Bronze	

Mixed doubles
Year	Venue	Partner	Opponent	Score	Result	Ref.
1990	Beijing Gymnasium, Beijing, China	(Indonesia) Verawaty Fadjrin	(South Korea) Park Joo-bong (South Korea) Chung Myung-hee	7–15, 15–7, 3–15	Silver	

=== SEA Games ===
Men's doubles
Year	Venue	Partner	Opponent	Score	Result	Ref.
1987	Kuningan Hall, Jakarta, Indonesia	(Indonesia) Liem Swie King	(Thailand) Sawei Chanseorasmee (Thailand) Sakrapee Thongsari	17–14, 15–9	Gold	
1989	Stadium Negara, Kuala Lumpur, Malaysia	(Indonesia) Rudy Gunawan	(Malaysia) Jalani Sidek (Malaysia) Razif Sidek	15–11, 15–12	Gold	
1991	Camp Crame Gymnasium, Manila, Philippines	(Indonesia) Rudy Gunawan	(Malaysia) Jalani Sidek (Malaysia) Razif Sidek	15–11, 15–6	Gold	

Mixed doubles
Year	Venue	Partner	Opponent	Score	Result	Ref.
1987	Kuningan Hall, Jakarta, Indonesia	(Indonesia) Verawaty Fadjrin	(Indonesia) Richard Mainaky (Indonesia) Yanti Kusmiati	15–9, 17–14	Gold	
1989	Stadium Negara, Kuala Lumpur, Malaysia	(Indonesia) Verawaty Fadjrin	(Indonesia) Aryono Miranat (Indonesia) Minarti Timur	16–17, 15–9, 15–2	Gold	

=== IBF World Grand Prix (17 titles, 7 runners-up) ===
The World Badminton Grand Prix sanctioned by International Badminton Federation (IBF) from 1983 to 2006.

Men's doubles
Year	Tournament	Partner	Opponent	Score	Result	Ref.
1986	World Grand Prix Finals	(Indonesia) Hadibowo	(Malaysia) Jalani Sidek (Malaysia) Razif Sidek	15–10, 5–15, 13–18	(silver) Runner-up	
1987	Chinese Taipei Open	(Indonesia) Liem Swie King	(Denmark) Mark Christiansen (Sweden) Stefan Karlsson	15–4, 15–5	(gold) Winner	
1987	Japan Open	(Indonesia) Liem Swie King	(South Korea) Lee Deuk-choon (South Korea) Shon Jin-hwan	15–4, 15–7	(gold) Winner	
1987	Thailand Open	(Indonesia) Liem Swie King	(China) Li Yongbo (China) Tian Bingyi	13–15, 11–15	(silver) Runner-up	
1987	Indonesia Open	(Indonesia) Liem Swie King	(Indonesia) Bobby Ertanto (Indonesia) Rudy Heryanto	15–6, 15–8	(gold) Winner	
1988	Dutch Open	(Indonesia) Rudy Gunawan	(Denmark) Michael Kjeldsen (Denmark) Jens Peter Nierhoff	12–15, 15–7, 4–15	(silver) Runner-up	
1988	World Grand Prix Finals	(Indonesia) Rudy Gunawan	(Malaysia) Jalani Sidek (Malaysia) Razif Sidek	15–10, 6–15, 8–15	(silver) Runner-up	
1989	All England Open	(Indonesia) Rudy Gunawan	(South Korea) Lee Sang-bok (South Korea) Park Joo-bong	8–15, 7–15	(silver) Runner-up	
1989	Dutch Open	(Indonesia) Rudy Gunawan	(Denmark) Jan Paulsen (Denmark) Henrik Svarrer	15–11, 15–2	(gold) Winner	
1989	Indonesia Open	(Indonesia) Rudy Gunawan	(Malaysia) Jalani Sidek (Malaysia) Razif Sidek	15–9, 15–7	(gold) Winner	
1990	Singapore Open	(Indonesia) Rudy Gunawan	(China) Li Yongbo (China) Tian Bingyi	15–4, 15–8	(gold) Winner	
1990	World Grand Prix Finals	(Indonesia) Rudy Gunawan	(Malaysia) Cheah Soon Kit (Malaysia) Soo Beng Kiang	15–6, 15–8	(gold) Winner	
1991	Indonesia Open	(Indonesia) Rudy Gunawan	(South Korea) Kim Moon-soo (South Korea) Park Joo-bong	15–18, 13–15	(silver) Runner-up	
1991	Dutch Open	(Indonesia) Rudy Gunawan	(Denmark) Jan Paulsen (Denmark) Henrik Svarrer	15–2, 15–11	(gold) Winner	
1991	German Open	(Indonesia) Rudy Gunawan	(Denmark) Jon Holst-Christensen (Denmark) Thomas Lund	15–9, 15–11	(gold) Winner	
1991	Thailand Open	(Indonesia) Rudy Gunawan	(Malaysia) Cheah Soon Kit (Malaysia) Soo Beng Kiang	15–3, 15–11	(gold) Winner	
1992	All England Open	(Indonesia) Rudy Gunawan	(Denmark) Jan Paulsen (Denmark) Henrik Svarrer	15–10, 15–12	(gold) Winner	
1992	Indonesia Open	(Indonesia) Rudy Gunawan	(Indonesia) Rexy Mainaky (Indonesia) Ricky Subagja	15–12, 15–5	(gold) Winner	
1993	Indonesia Open	(Indonesia) Richard Mainaky	(Indonesia) Rexy Mainaky (Indonesia) Ricky Subagja	13–15, 10–15	(silver) Runner-up	

Mixed doubles
Year	Tournament	Partner	Opponent	Score	Result	Ref.
1988	Indonesia Open	(Indonesia) Erma Sulistianingsih	(Indonesia) Bobby Ertanto (Indonesia) Verawaty Fadjrin	15–9, 15–11	(gold) Winner	
1988	Malaysia Open	(Indonesia) Verawaty Fadjrin	(China) Wang Pengren (China) Shi Fangjing	15–9, 15–7	(gold) Winner	
1989	Dutch Open	(Indonesia) Verawaty Fadjrin	(Indonesia) Rudy Gunawan (Indonesia) Rosiana Tendean	15–5, 15–5	(gold) Winner	
1989	Indonesia Open	(Indonesia) Verawaty Fadjrin	(Indonesia) Rudy Gunawan (Indonesia) Rosiana Tendean	15–7, 15–2	(gold) Winner	
1989	World Grand Prix Finals	(Indonesia) Verawaty Fadjrin	(Denmark) Thomas Lund (Denmark) Pernille Dupont	12–15, 15–7, 15–6	(gold) Winner	

IBF Grand Prix tournament
IBF Grand Prix Finals tournament

=== IBF International (1 title, 1 runner-up) ===
Men's singles
Year	Tournament	Opponent	Score	Result	Ref.
1984	Silver Bowl International	(Hong Kong) Sze Yu	3–15, 17–16, 12–15	(silver) Runner-up	
1984	Auckland International	(England) Andy Goode	15–4, 15–4	(gold) Winner	

=== Invitational Tournament ===
Men's doubles
Year	Tournament	Partner	Opponent	Score	Result	Ref.
1989	Konica Cup	(Indonesia) Rudy Gunawan	(Malaysia) Jalani Sidek (Malaysia) Razif Sidek	12–15, 8–15	(silver) Runner-up	
