= Yang Yang (badminton) =

Chinese badminton player

Yang Yang 杨阳
Personal information
- Born: 8 December 1963 (age 62) Nanjing, Jiangsu
- Height: 1.76 m (5 ft 9 in)

Sport
- Country: China
- Sport: Badminton
- Handedness: Left

Men's singles
- Highest ranking: 1
Medal record
Men's badminton
Representing China
World Championships
Gold medal – first place	1987 Beijing	Men's singles
Gold medal – first place	1989 Jakarta	Men's singles
Bronze medal – third place	1985 Calgary	Men's singles
World Cup
Gold medal – first place	1988 Bangkok	Men's singles
Gold medal – first place	1989 Guangzhou	Men's singles
Silver medal – second place	1984 Jakarta	Men's singles
Silver medal – second place	1987 Kuala Lumpur	Men's singles
Bronze medal – third place	1985 Jakarta	Men's singles
Bronze medal – third place	1986 Jakarta	Men's singles
Bronze medal – third place	1990 Jakarta	Men's singles
Sudirman Cup
Bronze medal – third place	1989 Jakarta	Mixed team
Thomas Cup
Gold medal – first place	1986 Jakarta	Men's team
Gold medal – first place	1988 Kuala Lumpur	Men's team
Gold medal – first place	1990 Tokyo	Men's team
Silver medal – second place	1984 Kuala Lumpur	Men's team
Asian Games
Gold medal – first place	1990 Beijing	Men's team
Silver medal – second place	1986 Seoul	Men's singles
Silver medal – second place	1990 Beijing	Men's singles
Silver medal – second place	1986 Seoul	Men's team
Asian Championships
Gold medal – first place	1985 Kuala Lumpur	Men's team
Gold medal – first place	1987 Semarang	Men's team
Silver medal – second place	1985 Kuala Lumpur	Men's singles

Yang Yang (simplified Chinese: 杨阳; traditional Chinese: 楊陽; born December 8, 1963, in Nanjing, Jiangsu) is a former Chinese badminton player.

He is the first men's singles player in the world to have won two World Badminton Championships consecutively (1987 and 1989). He also won the men's singles gold medal when badminton was a demonstration sport at the 1988 Summer Olympics. He possessed great agility, quick footwork, accurate power, and coolness under pressure, and is widely regarded as one of the finest singles players in the history of the sport.

== Career ==
Yang began training in 1975, when he was 12 years old. He was recruited by the Chinese national team in 1983. He won his first Chinese national championship title in 1984. In 1985, he won the Hong Kong Open by defeating Morten Frost. In 1986, he won the Japan Open and the Hong Kong Open for the second straight year, and also helped China to regain the Thomas Cup (men's world team championship) from Indonesia by winning key matches. In the late 80s he dominated international singles play, winning the World Championships over Morten Frost in 1987 and over young Ardy Wiranata in 1989. In 1988 he also won the Olympic exhibition event in Seoul (badminton became an official Olympic sport at the next games in Barcelona). In 1989 he added the venerable All-England Championships to his tally; thus, by twenty-five, he captured all the titles by which "greatness" in the sport is generally measured.

=== China's Golden Generation ===
As a member of China's golden badminton generation of the 1980s which included stars Zhao Jianhua and Xiong Guobao, Yang Yang played an crucial role in making China the major world badminton superpower. His play was instrumental in China's consecutive Thomas Cup (men's world team) titles in 1986, 1988, and 1990.

=== Retirement ===
In 1991, he retired as a player and started coaching in Malaysia. In the very next year, he guided Malaysia to its first Thomas Cup victory in 25 years, the only occasion since 1967 in which neither Indonesia nor China has won the cup. He then stayed in Malaysia to develop his business for badminton equipment. He returned to China in year 2000, and opened a badminton club named after himself in Nanjing.

== Achievements ==
=== Olympic Games (exhibition) ===
Men's singles
Year	Venue	Opponent	Score	Result
1988	Seoul National University Gymnasium, Seoul, South Korea	(Indonesia) Icuk Sugiarto	15–4, 15–10	Gold

=== World Championships ===
Men's singles
Year	Venue	Opponent	Score	Result
1985	Olympic Saddledome, Calgary, Canada	(Denmark) Morten Frost	8–15, 5–15	Bronze
1987	Capital Indoor Stadium, Beijing, China	(Denmark) Morten Frost	15–2, 13–15, 15–12	Gold
1989	Senayan Sports Complex, Jakarta, Indonesia	(Indonesia) Ardy Wiranata	15–10, 2–15, 15–5	Gold

=== World Cup ===
Men's singles
Year	Venue	Opponent	Score	Result
1984	Istora Senayan, Jakarta, Indonesia	(China) Han Jian	12–15, 10–15	Silver
1985	Istora Senayan, Jakarta, Indonesia	(Denmark) Morten Frost	15–12, 14–17, 10–15	Bronze
1986	Istora Senayan, Jakarta, Indonesia	(Denmark) Morten Frost	9–15, 1–15	Bronze
1987	Stadium Negara, Kuala Lumpur, Malaysia	(China) Zhao Jianhua	15–6, 2–15, 12–15	Silver
1988	National Stadium, Bangkok, Thailand	(China) Zhao Jianhua	15–5, 15–6	Gold
1989	Guangzhou Gymnasium, Guangzhou, China	(Malaysia) Foo Kok Keong	17–14, 15–6	Gold
1990	Istora Senayan, Jakarta, Indonesia	(China) Wu Wenkai	12–15, 9–15	Bronze

=== Asian Games ===
Men's singles
Year	Venue	Opponent	Score	Result
1986	Olympic Gymnastics Arena, Seoul, South Korea	(China) Zhao Jianhua	9–15, 16–17	Silver
1990	Beijing Gymnasium, Beijing, China	(China) Zhao Jianhua	10–15, 11–15	Silver

=== Asian Championships ===
Men's singles
Year	Venue	Opponent	Score	Result
1985	Stadium Negara, Kuala Lumpur, Malaysia	(China) Zhao Jianhua	10–15, 15–5, 6–15	Silver

=== IBF World Grand Prix (9 titles, 1 runners-up) ===
The World Badminton Grand Prix sanctioned by International Badminton Federation (IBF) from 1983 to 2006.

Men's singles
Year	Tournament	Opponent	Score	Result
1985	Hong Kong Open	(Denmark) Morten Frost	15–10, 15–11	(gold) Winner
1986	Japan Open	(Denmark) Ib Frederiksen	5–15, 15–6, 15–8	(gold) Winner
1986	Hong Kong Open	(Indonesia) Icuk Sugiarto	6–15, 15–8, 15–6	(gold) Winner
1986	World Grand Prix Finals	(Denmark) Morten Frost	18–13, 15–8	(gold) Winner
1987	Scandinavian Open	(Indonesia) Icuk Sugiarto	Walkover	(gold) Winner
1987	Malaysia Open	(Denmark) Steen Fladberg	4–15, 15–10, 15–7	(gold) Winner
1987	Indonesia Open	(Indonesia) Eddy Kurniawan	15–6, 15–8	(gold) Winner
1988	Hong Kong Open	(Indonesia) Icuk Sugiarto	15–7, 1–15, 11–15	(silver) Runner-up
1989	Japan Open	(Malaysia) Foo Kok Keong	15–2, 15–10	(gold) Winner
1989	All England Open	(Denmark) Morten Frost	15–6, 15–7	(gold) Winner

=== Invitation Tournament (1 title) ===
Year	Tournament	Opponent	Score	Result
1988	Konica Cup	(Thailand) Sompol Kukasemkij	15–10, 15–2	(gold) Winner
