= Singapore at the 1990 Asian Games =

- IOC code: SIN
- NOC: Singapore National Olympic Council
- Website: www.singaporeolympics.com (in English)

in Beijing, China
- Competitors: 115
- Flag bearer: David Lim
- Medals Ranked 19th: Gold 0 Silver 1 Bronze 4 Total 5

Asian Games appearances (overview)
- 1951; 1954; 1958; 1962; 1966; 1970; 1974; 1978; 1982; 1986; 1990; 1994; 1998; 2002; 2006; 2010; 2014; 2018; 2022; 2026

Singapore competed in the 1990 Asian Games in Beijing, China from 22 September to 7 October 1990. Singapore finished the Games with a total of 5 medals, placing nineteenth in the medal table.

== Medal summary ==
=== Medals by sport ===
Sport	Gold	Silver	Bronze	Total	Rank
Sepaktakraw	0	0	2	2	3
Shooting	0	0	1	1	6
Swimming	0	1	1	2	4
Total	0	1	4	5	19

=== Medalists ===
Medal	Name	Sport	Event
Silver	Ang Peng Siong	Swimming	Men's 50 m freestyle
Bronze	Eddie Abdul Kadir; Rafi Abdul Majid; Nur Hisham Adam; Padzli Othman	Sepaktakraw	Men's regu
Bronze	Eddie Abdul Kadir; Rafi Abdul Majid; Nur Hisham Adam; Raffi Buang; Hairulnizam Hamzah; Shaharuddin Jumani; Zulkefle Khamis; Mohd Fami Mohamed; Hassan Nanang; Padzli Othman	Sepaktakraw	Men's team
Bronze	Chng Seng Mok	Shooting	Men's trap
Bronze	Ang Peng Siong; Harold Gan; David Lim; Kenneth Yeo	Swimming	Men's 4 × 100 m freestyle relay
