= Pakistan at the 1990 Asian Games =

- IOC code: PAK
- NOC: Pakistan Olympic Association

in Beijing
- Medals Ranked 6th: Gold 4 Silver 1 Bronze 7 Total 12

Asian Games appearances (overview)
- 1954; 1958; 1962; 1966; 1970; 1974; 1978; 1982; 1986; 1990; 1994; 1998; 2002; 2006; 2010; 2014; 2018; 2022; 2026

Pakistan participated in the 1990 Asian Games in Beijing, China from September 22, to October 7, 1990. Pakistan ranked 6th and got 4 golds (one each in athletics, boxing, field hockey, and sailing), 1 silver and 7 bronze medals for a total of 12 medals overall.

== Medalists ==
Sport	Athlete	Medal
Athletics (details)	Ghulam Abbas	1st place, gold medalist(s)
Athletics (details)	Nadir Khan	3rd place, bronze medalist(s)
Boxing (details)	Ibrar Hussain Shah	1st place, gold medalist(s)
Boxing (details)	Muhammad Latif	2nd place, silver medalist(s)
Boxing (details)	Zaigham Maseel	3rd place, bronze medalist(s)
Boxing (details)	Muhammad Sahib	3rd place, bronze medalist(s)
Boxing (details)	Dildar Ahmed	3rd place, bronze medalist(s)
Boxing (details)	Muhammad Asghar	3rd place, bronze medalist(s)
Field hockey (details)	Qazi Mohib (Captain)	1st place, gold medalist(s)
Field hockey (details)	Shahid Ali Khan	1st place, gold medalist(s)
Field hockey (details)	Mansoor Ahmed	1st place, gold medalist(s)
Field hockey (details)	Khalid Bashir	1st place, gold medalist(s)
Field hockey (details)	Rana Mujad	1st place, gold medalist(s)
Field hockey (details)	Anjum Saeed	1st place, gold medalist(s)
Field hockey (details)	Farhat Khan	1st place, gold medalist(s)
Field hockey (details)	K.M. Junaid	1st place, gold medalist(s)
Field hockey (details)	Shahbaz Ahmed	1st place, gold medalist(s)
Field hockey (details)	Waseem Feroze	1st place, gold medalist(s)
Field hockey (details)	Zahid Sharif	1st place, gold medalist(s)
Field hockey (details)	Muhammad Irfan	1st place, gold medalist(s)
Field hockey (details)	Qamar Ibrahim	1st place, gold medalist(s)
Field hockey (details)	M. Riasat	1st place, gold medalist(s)
Field hockey (details)	Mussadiq Hussain	1st place, gold medalist(s)
Field hockey (details)	Tahir Zaman	1st place, gold medalist(s)
Kabaddi (details)	Muhammad Sarwar (Captain)	3rd place, bronze medalist(s)
Kabaddi (details)	Tahir Waheed	3rd place, bronze medalist(s)
Kabaddi (details)	Talat Mehmood	3rd place, bronze medalist(s)
Kabaddi (details)	Abdul Razaq	3rd place, bronze medalist(s)
Kabaddi (details)	Rana Saif Ullah	3rd place, bronze medalist(s)
Kabaddi (details)	Mansha	3rd place, bronze medalist(s)
Kabaddi (details)	Mubashir Iqbal	3rd place, bronze medalist(s)
Kabaddi (details)	Sultan Mehmood	3rd place, bronze medalist(s)
Kabaddi (details)	Muhammad Hussain	3rd place, bronze medalist(s)
Kabaddi (details)	Pervaiz Ahmed	3rd place, bronze medalist(s)
Kabaddi (details)	Muhammad Farooq	3rd place, bronze medalist(s)
Kabaddi (details)	Nisar Ahmed	3rd place, bronze medalist(s)
Weightlifting (details)	Rafey Saeed Butt	3rd place, bronze medalist(s)
Sailing (details)	Lt. Cdr. Munir Sadiq	1st place, gold medalist(s)
Sailing (details)	Lt. Cdr. Zakaullah	1st place, gold medalist(s)
