= Laos at the 1990 Asian Games =

- IOC code: LAO
- NOC: National Olympic Committee of Lao

in Beijing
- Medals Ranked 22nd: Gold 0 Silver 0 Bronze 1 Total 1

Asian Games appearances (overview)
- 1974; 1978; 1982; 1986; 1990; 1994; 1998; 2002; 2006; 2010; 2014; 2018; 2022; 2026

Laos participated in the 1990 Asian Games. The 11th Asian Games, also known as XI Asiad, were held from September 22, 1990 to October 7, 1990 in Beijing, China.

This was the 3rd time that the Laos delegation participated. Laos ended the games with 1 bronze medal won by Vongkot Chinda in the men's Lightweight (60 kg) boxing event.
