= 1990 Asian Games =

Multi-sport event in Beijing, China

XI Asian Games
- Host city: Beijing, China
- Motto: Unity, friendship and progress (Chinese: 团结、友谊、进步; pinyin: Tuánjié, yǒuyì, jìnbù)
- Nations: 31
- Athletes: 6,122
- Events: 308 in 27 sports
- Opening: 22 September 1990
- Closing: 7 October 1990
- Opened by: Yang Shangkun; President of China
- Closed by: Roy de Silva; Acting President of Olympic Council of Asia
- Athlete's Oath: Chen Longcan
- Torch lighter: Xu Haifeng, Gao Min, and Zhang Rongfang
- Main venue: Workers' Stadium

Summer

Winter

The 1990 Asian Games, also known as the XI Asiad and the 11th Asian Games (第十一届亚洲运动会) or simply Beijing 1990 (北京1990), were held from September 22 to October 7, 1990, in Beijing, China. This was the first Asian Games held in China.

Along with the 1993 East Asian Games, this event served as a precursor to China's further development in the sporting arena, as before the city went on to bid for the 2000 Summer Olympics (losing to Sydney) and eventually won the bids for the 2001 Summer Universiade, the 2008 Summer Olympics and the 2022 Winter Olympics. In a fact with precedent, China dominated the games, grabbing 60% of the gold medals and 34% of the total medal count. China set a new record by becoming the first nation in the history of the Asian Games to cross the 100-gold medal mark and the 300-total medal mark in one edition.

This also marked Taiwan's first participation in the Asian Games as Chinese Taipei and also the first time Brunei Darusssalam competed in the Asian Games after its independence in 1984.

== Bidding process ==
In 1983, Beijing and Hiroshima demonstrated interest in hosting the 1990 Asian Games. The two cities made formal presentations before the Olympic Council of Asia board. They were evaluated in a meeting of the council in Seoul during 1984, which also served to evaluate the preparations for the next Asian Games and also for the 1988 Summer Olympics.

Beijing eventually won the right to host the 1990 edition, while the team from Hiroshima presented an excellent technical bid, and won the rights to host of the 1994 Asian Games as compensation in an unprecedented move.

34 votes were needed for selection.

1990 Asian Games bidding result
City	Country	Votes
Beijing	China	44
Hiroshima	Japan	23

== Development and preparations ==
=== Marketing ===
==== Stamps ====
To commemorate the 11th Asian Games, three different sets of stamps were issued in 1988, 1989 and 1990.

==== Mascot ====
Pan Pan, the official mascot of the Games

The official mascot of this edition was Pan Pan (Chinese: 盼盼), the panda.

==== Theme song ====
The official theme song of the games was "Spirit of Asia", performed in Chinese and English versions.

=== Venues ===
The following venues were used during the Games. Yayuncun Subdistrict, the athlete's village was located in Chaoyang District and is now a residential area.

Venue	Sports
Workers' Stadium	Ceremonies, Football (men)
Workers' Gymnasium	Table tennis
Beijing Shooting Range Field	Archery, Shooting
Beijing Golf Club	Golf
Beijing Gymnasium	Badminton
Beijing Sports University Gymnasium	Boxing
Beijing International Tennis Center	Tennis, Soft tennis (Demonstration)
Beijing University Students' Gymnasium	Basketball
Beijing Water Polo Pool	Water polo
Capital Institute of Physical Education Stadium	Kabaddi
Chaoyang Gymnasium	Volleyball
Capital Indoor Stadium	Gymnastics, Basketball, Volleyball
Changping Velodrome	Cycling (track)
Ditan Gymnasium	Weightlifting
Fengtai Gymnasium	Sepak takraw
Fengtai Softball and Baseball Field	Baseball (Demonstration), Softball
Fengtai Stadium	Football (men)
Guangcai Gymnasium	Fencing
Haidian Gymnasium	Wushu
Haidian Stadium	Football (women)
Jinhai Lake Sports Park	Canoeing, Rowing
Olympic Sport Center Stadium	Athletics
Olympic Sports Center Gymnasium	Handball
Olympic Sports Center Hockey Field	Field hockey
Qinhuangdao Marine Stadium	Sailing
Shijingshan Stadium	Football (women)
Shijingshan Gymnasium	Wrestling
Xiannongtan Stadium	Football (men)
Ying Tung Natatorium	Diving, Swimming
Yuetan Gymnasium	Judo
Huairou-Miyun and Changping Xiezishi Highway	Cycling (road)

== The Games ==
=== Sports ===
- Archery
- Athletics
- Aquatics
  - Diving
  - Swimming
  - Water polo
- Badminton
- Basketball
- Boxing
- Canoeing
- Cycling
- Fencing
- Field hockey
- Football
- Golf
- Gymnastics
- Handball
- Judo
- Kabaddi
- Rowing
- Sailing
- Sepak takraw
- Shooting
- Softball
- Table tennis
- Tennis
- Volleyball
- Weightlifting
- Wrestling
- Wushu

Demonstration sports

- Baseball ()
- Soft tennis ()

=== Participating National Olympic Committees ===
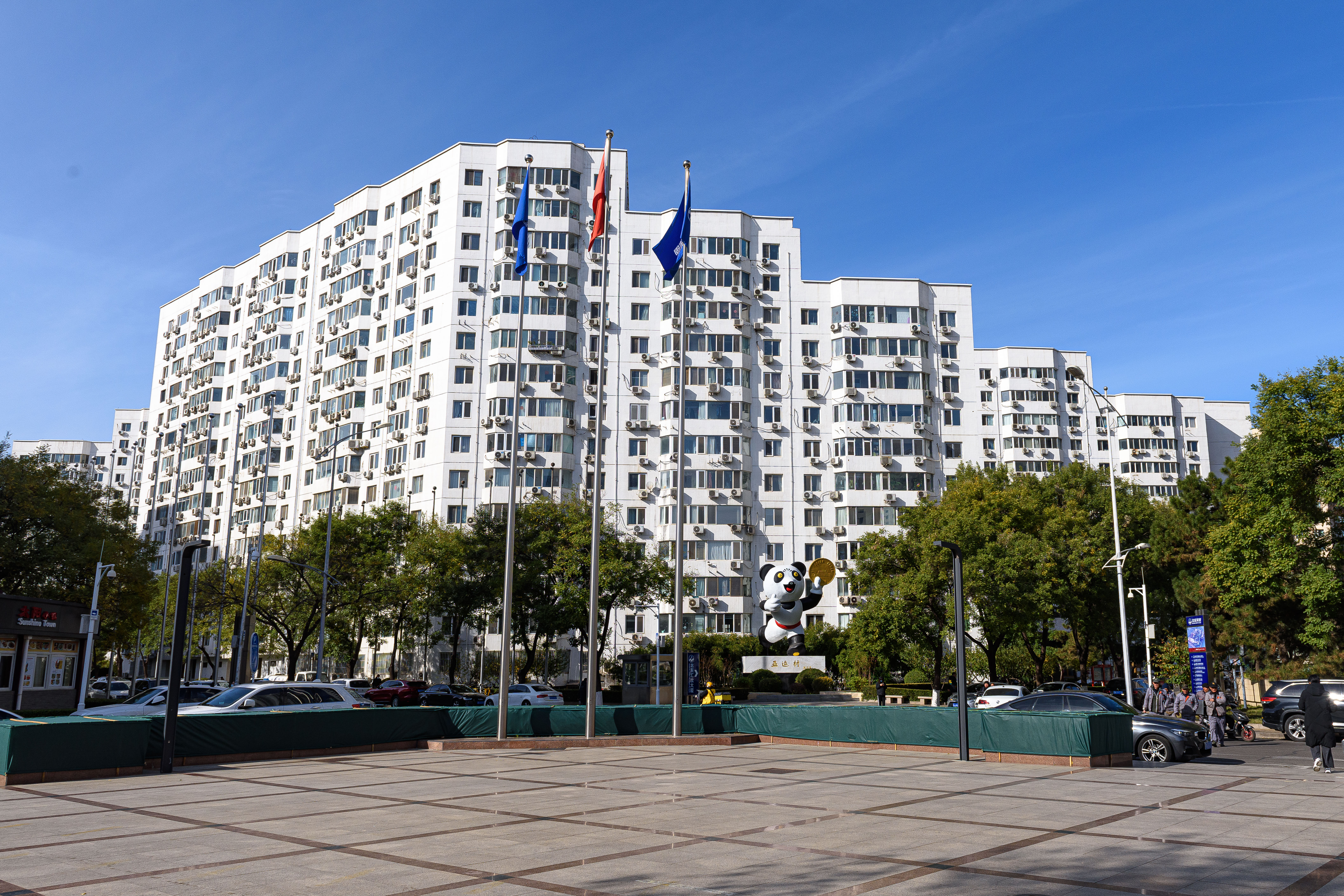
The Beijing Asian Games Village, currently North Star Huiyuan Apartments

For the first time, all the participating National Olympic Committees (NOCs) were named according to their official IOC designations and arranged according to their official IOC country codes in 1990. Iraq was suspended by the Olympic Council of Asia from participating in the Asian Games due to the Iraqi invasion of Kuwait (Gulf War) which killed first OCA president Fahad Al-Ahmed Al-Jaber Al-Sabah. Iraq would only return to compete in Doha 2006.

- Afghanistan (23)
- Bahrain (21)
- Bangladesh (26)
- Bhutan (11)
- Brunei (3)
- China (775)
- Chinese Taipei (78)
- Hong Kong (188)
- India (195)
- Indonesia (152)
- Iran (102)
- Japan (543)
- Kuwait (8)
- Laos (15)
- Lebanon (22)
- Macau (3)
- Malaysia (173)
- Maldives (9)
- Mongolia (17)
- Myanmar (31)
- Nepal (67)
- North Korea (86)
- Oman (21)
- Pakistan (144)
- Palestine (4)
- Philippines (285)
- Qatar (92)
- Saudi Arabia (161)
- Singapore (237)
- South Korea (553)
- Sri Lanka (171)
- Syria (61)
- Thailand
- United Arab Emirates
- Vietnam
- Yemen (98)

Number of athletes by National Olympic Committees (by highest to lowest)

IOC Letter Code	Country	Athletes
CHN	China	775
VIE	Vietnam	694
THA	Thailand	414
JPN	Japan	372
KOR	South Korea	371
PHI	Philippines	285
SIN	Singapore	237
UAE	United Arab Emirates	222
IND	India	195
HKG	Hong Kong	188
MAL	Malaysia	173
SRI	Sri Lanka	171
KSA	Saudi Arabia	161
INA	Indonesia	152
PAK	Pakistan	144
IRN	Iran	102
YEM	Yemen	98
QAT	Qatar	92
PRK	North Korea	86
TPE	Chinese Taipei	78
NEP	Nepal	67
SYR	Syria	61
MYA	Myanmar	31
BAN	Bangladesh	26
AFG	Afghanistan	23
LIB	Lebanon	22
BRN	Bahrain	21
OMA	Oman	21
MGL	Mongolia	17
LAO	Laos	15
BHU	Bhutan	11
MDV	Maldives	9
KUW	Kuwait	8
PLE	Palestine	4
BRU	Brunei	3
MAC	Macau	3

== Medal table ==
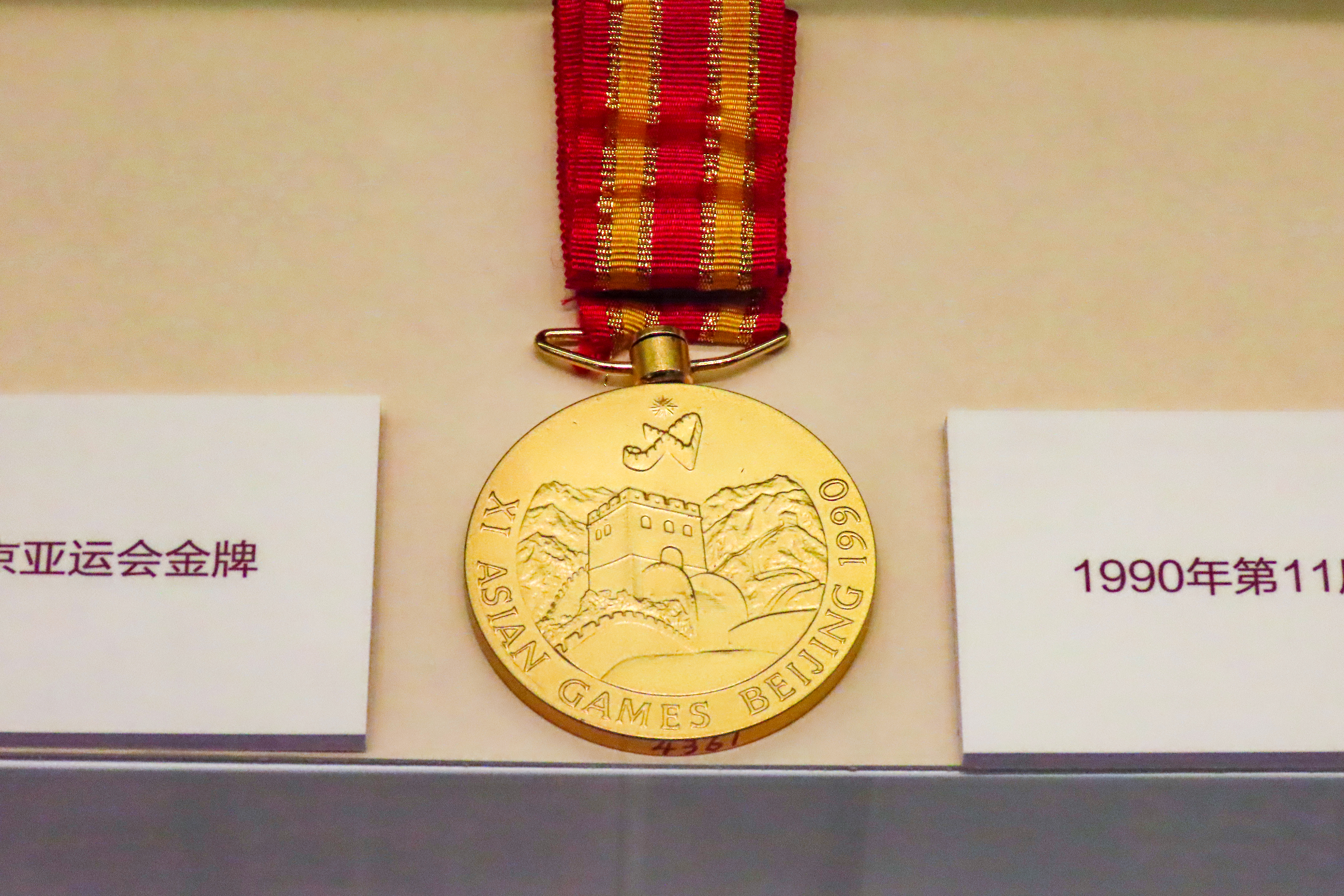
A gold medal of the 1990 Asian Games

The top ten ranked NOCs at these Games are listed below. The host nation, China, is highlighted.

* Host nation (China)

Rank	NOC	Gold	Silver	Bronze	Total
1	China (CHN)*	183	107	51	341
2	South Korea (KOR)	54	54	73	181
3	Japan (JPN)	38	60	76	174
4	North Korea (PRK)	12	31	39	82
5	Iran (IRN)	4	6	8	18
6	Pakistan (PAK)	4	1	7	12
7	Indonesia (INA)	3	6	21	30
8	Qatar (QAT)	3	2	1	6
9	Thailand (THA)	2	7	8	17
10	Malaysia (MAS)	2	2	4	8
11–25	Remaining	5	33	69	107
Totals (25 entries)		310	309	357	976

Preceded by Seoul	Asian Games; Beijing; XI Asian Games (1990)	Succeeded by Hiroshima
