= South Korea at the 1990 Asian Games =

- IOC code: KOR
- NOC: Korean Olympic Committee

in Beijing
- Competitors: 552 in 26 sports
- Officials: 142
- Medals Ranked 2nd: Gold 54 Silver 54 Bronze 73 Total 181

Asian Games appearances (overview)
- 1954; 1958; 1962; 1966; 1970; 1974; 1978; 1982; 1986; 1990; 1994; 1998; 2002; 2006; 2010; 2014; 2018; 2022; 2026

South Korea (IOC designation:Korea) participated in the 1990 Asian Games held in Beijing, the People's Republic of China from September 22, 1990 to October 7, 1990.

== Medal summary ==
=== Medal table ===
Sport	Gold	Silver	Bronze	Total
Wrestling	11	0	4	15
Shooting	5	10	8	23
Weightlifting	5	2	3	10
Boxing	5	2	2	9
Archery	4	1	2	7
Fencing	3	6	2	11
Canoeing	3	2	3	8
Athletics	2	6	4	12
Judo	2	5	9	16
Gymnastics	2	2	3	7
Table tennis	2	2	2	6
Cycling	2	1	4	7
Golf	2	1	1	4
Handball	2	0	0	2
Badminton	1	3	2	6
Swimming	1	1	5	7
Sailing	1	1	3	5
Basketball	1	0	1	2
Hockey	1	0	0	1
Rowing	0	4	5	9
Tennis	0	3	6	9
Volleyball	0	2	0	2
Football	0	0	1	1
Water polo	0	0	1	1
Totals (24 entries)	55	54	71	180
