= Japan at the 1990 Asian Games =

- IOC code: JPN
- NOC: Japanese Olympic Committee

in Beijing
- Competitors: 543 in 27 sports
- Flag bearer: Ichiko Sato
- Medals Ranked 3rd: Gold 38 Silver 60 Bronze 76 Total 174

Asian Games appearances (overview)
- 1951; 1954; 1958; 1962; 1966; 1970; 1974; 1978; 1982; 1986; 1990; 1994; 1998; 2002; 2006; 2010; 2014; 2018; 2022; 2026

Japan participated in the 1990 Asian Games held in Beijing, China from September 22, 1990 to October 7, 1990. The country was ranked 3rd in the medal tally with 38 gold medals, 60 silver medals and 76 bronze medals; a total of 174 medals.

== Results ==
Susumu Takano won gold in the men's 200m sprint, beating Sriyantha Dissanayake from Sri Lanka with a time of 20.94. Koichi Morishita won gold in the 10,000m event and Masami Yoshida and Munehiro Kaneko secured gold medals in the Javelin throw and Decathlon, respectively. Megumi Sato won Japan's only women's Athletics gold medal with a win in the High jump.

In the women's football, the competition included a number of significantly one-sided games. Japan beat South Korean 8 - 1 and then Hong Kong 5 - 0. But the Japanese were beaten 5 - 0 by the Chinese team who also beat Hong Kong 10 - 0 and South Korea 8 - 0 and finished with 10 points and a +26 goal difference to secure the gold medal. The Japanese team secured 7 points and the silver medal. The men's team secured a place in the knock-out quarter finals but were defeated 1 - 0 by Iran who went on to win the final and the gold medal.

In the Archery, Japan's Takayoshi Matsushita won silver in the individual men's event and then joined with Sadamu Nishikawa and Hiroshi Yamamoto to win the silver medal in the men's team event.

Though the Chinese team dominated women's swimming events, the Japanese men's team won 7 gold medals including gold for the 4 × 200 m relay. Munehiro Kaneko won both the 200m and 400m individual medley events, edging out countryman Shuichi Nakamura in both events.

The Japanese team secured silver in the men's water polo (there was no equivalent women's competition).

Japan dominated both men's golf events with Shigeki Maruyama securing gold in the individual men's category and a Maruyama-led Japanese team securing gold in the team event.
