= China at the 1990 Asian Games =

- IOC code: CHN
- NOC: Chinese Olympic Committee external link (in Chinese and English)

in Beijing
- Medals Ranked 1st: Gold 183 Silver 107 Bronze 51 Total 341

Asian Games appearances (overview)
- 1974; 1978; 1982; 1986; 1990; 1994; 1998; 2002; 2006; 2010; 2014; 2018; 2022; 2026

China competed in the 1990 Asian Games as host nation which were held in Beijing, China from September 22, 1990 to October 7, 1990. China set a new record by becoming the first nation in the history of the Asian Games to cross the 100-gold medal mark and the 300-total medal mark in one edition.

== See also ==
- China at the Asian Games
- China at the Olympics
- Sport in China
