= 1984 Uber Cup qualification =

Tournament details
- Dates: 20 – 26 February 1984
- Location: Asian zone: Hong Kong; New Delhi American zone: Toronto European zone: Ostend

The qualifying process for the 1984 Uber Cup took place from 20 to 26 February 1984 to decide the final teams which will play in the final tournament.

== Qualification process ==
Starting from 1984, the qualification process will be divided into three regions, the Asian Zone, the European Zone and the Pan American Zone. The Asian Zone is subdivided into two subzones, the West and the East. Teams in the East Asian zone and the Pan American zone will compete in a round-robin elimination format to decide which team will get a place in the final tournament to be held in Kuala Lumpur while the teams in the West Asian zone and the European Zone will advance to the knockout stages after competing in the round-robin stages of their respective zone to compete for a place in the final tournament.

Japan qualified for the final tournament as defending champions while Malaysia qualified as hosts.

=== Qualified teams ===
| Country | Qualified as | Qualified on | Final appearance |
|---|---|---|---|
| Malaysia | 1984 Thomas Cup hosts | 8 March 1983 | 3rd |
| Japan | 1981 Uber Cup winners | 31 May 1981 | 6th |
| South Korea | West Asian Zone winners | 26 February 1984 | 1st |
| Indonesia | West Asian Zone runners-up | 26 February 1984 | 8th |
| China | East Asian Zone winners | 23 February 1984 | 1st |
| Canada | Pan American Zone winners | 24 February 1984 | 7th |
| England | European Zone winners | 26 February 1984 | 6th |
| Denmark | European Zone runners-up | 26 February 1984 | 5th |

== Asian Zone (West) ==
The qualification rounds for the West Asian Zone were held from 22 to 26 February at the Indraprashtha Indoor Stadium in New Delhi, India. Burma withdrew from the competition.

=== Group stage ===
==== Group A ====
| Pos | Team | Pld | W | L | MF | MA | MD | Pts | Qualification |
|---|---|---|---|---|---|---|---|---|---|
| 1 | South Korea | 1 | 1 | 0 | 5 | 0 | +5 | 1 | Advance to knockout stage |
| 2 | Sri Lanka | 1 | 0 | 1 | 0 | 5 | −5 | 0 | Advance to knockout stage |
| 3 | Burma | 0 | 0 | 0 | 0 | 0 | 0 | 0 | Withdrew |

Source: Singapore Monitor

South Korea
5
Indraprashtha Indoor Stadium
24 February 1984

Sri Lanka
0

| | | | 1 | 2 | 3 |
|---|---|---|---|---|---|
| 1 | (South Korea) (Sri Lanka) | Kim Yun-ja; Imali Fernando | 11; 0 | 11; 0 |
| 2 | (South Korea) (Sri Lanka) | Yoo Sang-hee; Lanthika Madugalla | 11; 1 | 11; 0 |
| 3 | (South Korea) (Sri Lanka) | Kang Haeng-suk; Sriyani Deepika | 15; 2 | 15; 0 |
| 4 | (South Korea) (Sri Lanka) | Kim Yun-ja / Yoo Sang-hee; Imali Fernando / Lanthika Madugalla | 15; 1 | 15; 0 |
| 5 | (South Korea) (Sri Lanka) | Chung Myung-hee / Park Hyun-suk; Samathi Hettiarachchi / Yasintha Liyanage | 15; 0 | 15; 1 |

==== Group B ====
| Pos | Team | Pld | W | L | MF | MA | MD | Pts | Qualification |
|---|---|---|---|---|---|---|---|---|---|
| 1 | Indonesia | 2 | 2 | 0 | 10 | 0 | +10 | 2 | Advance to knockout stage |
| 2 | India | 2 | 1 | 1 | 4 | 6 | −2 | 1 | Advance to knockout stage |
| 3 | Thailand | 2 | 0 | 2 | 1 | 9 | −8 | 0 | |

Source: Singapore Monitor

Indonesia
5
Indraprashtha Indoor Stadium
22 February 1984

Thailand
0

| | | | 1 | 2 | 3 |
|---|---|---|---|---|---|
| 1 | (Indonesia) (Thailand) | Ivana Lie; Vilailak Chauycham | 15; 3 | 15; 6 |
| 2 | (Indonesia) (Thailand) | Elizabeth Latief; Darunee Lertvoralak | 15; 3 | 15; 4 |
| 3 | (Indonesia) (Thailand) | Ratih Kumaladewi; Ladawan Mulasartsatorn | 15; 8 | 15; 0 |
| 4 | (Indonesia) (Thailand) | Ruth Damayanti / Maria Fransisca; Chitrad Chartrungsun / Sanguanari Kasayapanand | 15; 1 | 15; 6 |
| 5 | (Indonesia) (Thailand) | Ivana Lie / Rosiana Tendean; Darunee Lertvoralak / Ladawan Mulasartsatorn | 15; 1 | 15; 5 |

India
4
Indraprashtha Indoor Stadium
23 February 1984

Thailand
1

| | | | 1 | 2 | 3 |
|---|---|---|---|---|---|
| 1 | (India) (Thailand) | Ami Ghia; Vilailak Chauycham | 11; 5 | 4; 11 | 11; 2 |
| 2 | (India) (Thailand) | Madhumita Bisht; Darunee Lertvoralak | 12; 9 | 11; 1 |
| 3 | (India) (Thailand) | Amita Kulkarni; Ladawan Mulasartsatorn | 11; 4 | 11; 7 |
| 4 | (India) (Thailand) | Ami Ghia / Madhumita Bisht; Chitrad Chartrungsun / Sanguanari Kasayapanand | 15; 9 | 15; 6 |
| 5 | (India) (Thailand) | Amita Kulkarni / Hufrish Nariman; Darunee Lertvoralak / Ladawan Mulasartsatorn | 13; 18 | 15; 6 | 12; 15 |

Indonesia
5
Indraprashtha Indoor Stadium
24 February 1984

India
0

| | | | 1 | 2 | 3 |
|---|---|---|---|---|---|
| 1 | (Indonesia) (India) | Ivana Lie; Ami Ghia | 11; 8 | 11; 1 |
| 2 | (Indonesia) (India) | Elizabeth Latief; Madhumita Bisht | 15; 8 | 15; 0 |
| 3 | (Indonesia) (India) | Yanti Kusmiati; Amita Kulkarni | 4; 11 | 11; 3 | 11; 8 |
| 4 | (Indonesia) (India) | Ruth Damayanti / Yanti Kusmiati; Madhumita Bisht / Ami Ghia | 15; 11 | 15; 5 |
| 5 | (Indonesia) (India) | Mary Harlim / Rosiana Tendean; Amita Kulkarni / Hufrish Nariman | 15; 9 | 15; 7 |

=== Knockout stage ===
Semi-finals
South Korea | 5
India | 0
Sri Lanka | 0
Indonesia | 5

Final
South Korea | 4
Indonesia | 1
Third place
India | 5
Sri Lanka | 0

==== Semi-finals ====
South Korea
5
Indraprashtha Indoor Stadium
25 February 1984

India
0

| | | | 1 | 2 | 3 |
|---|---|---|---|---|---|
| 1 | (South Korea) (India) | Kim Yun-ja; Ami Ghia | 11; 6 | 11; 5 |
| 2 | (South Korea) (India) | Yoo Sang-hee; Madhumita Bisht | 11; 5 | 10; 12 | 11; 2 |
| 3 | (South Korea) (India) | Kim Yoon-sook; Amita Kulkarni | 11; 1 | 11; 4 |
| 4 | (South Korea) (India) | Kim Yun-ja / Yoo Sang-hee; Madhumita Bisht / Ami Ghia | 15; 6 | 15; 6 |
| 5 | (South Korea) (India) | Cho Keum-shin / Chung Myung-hee; Hufrish Nariman / Sudha Padmanabhan | 15; 0 | 15; 1 |

Indonesia
5
Indraprashtha Indoor Stadium
25 February 1984

Sri Lanka
0

| | | | 1 | 2 | 3 |
|---|---|---|---|---|---|
| 1 | (Indonesia) (Sri Lanka) | Ivana Lie; Imali Fernando | 11; 1 | 11; 0 |
| 2 | (Indonesia) (Sri Lanka) | Elizabeth Latief; Lanthika Madugalla | 11; 0 | 11; 3 |
| 3 | (Indonesia) (Sri Lanka) | Ratih Kumaladewi; Sriyani Deepika | 11; 1 | 11; 3 |
| 4 | (Indonesia) (Sri Lanka) | Mary Harlim / Rosiana Tendean; Samathi Hettiarachchi / Yasintha Liyanage | 15; 1 | 15; 0 |
| 5 | (Indonesia) (Sri Lanka) | Ruth Damayanti / Yanti Kusmiati; Sriyani Deepika / Lanthika Madugalla | 15; 0 | 15; 1 |

==== Third place ====
India
5
Indraprashtha Indoor Stadium
26 February 1984

Sri Lanka
0

| | | | 1 | 2 | 3 |
|---|---|---|---|---|---|
| 1 | (India) (Sri Lanka) | Ami Ghia; Imali Fernando | 11; 3 | 11; 2 |
| 2 | (India) (Sri Lanka) | Madhumita Bisht; Lanthika Madugalla | 11; 5 | 11; 1 |
| 3 | (India) (Sri Lanka) | Amita Kulkarni; Sriyani Deepika | 11; 1 | 11; 3 |
| 4 | (India) (Sri Lanka) | Madhumita Bisht / Ami Ghia; Samathi Hettiarachchi / Yasintha Liyanage | 15; 1 | 15; 5 |
| 5 | (India) (Sri Lanka) | Amita Kulkarni / Hufrish Nariman; Sriyani Deepika / Lanthika Madugalla | 15; 0 | 15; 1 |

==== Final ====
Indonesia
1
Indraprashtha Indoor Stadium
26 February 1984

South Korea
4

| | | | 1 | 2 | 3 |
|---|---|---|---|---|---|
| 1 | (Indonesia) (South Korea) | Ivana Lie; Kim Yun-ja | 12; 10 | 2; 11 | 3; 11 |
| 2 | (Indonesia) (South Korea) | Elizabeth Latief; Kang Haeng-suk | 9; 11 | 2; 11 |
| 3 | (Indonesia) (South Korea) | Yanti Kusmiati; Kim Yoon-sook | 8; 11 | 7; 11 |
| 4 | (Indonesia) (South Korea) | Ruth Damayanti / Maria Fransisca; Kim Yun-ja / Kang Haeng-suk | 6; 15 | 11; 15 |
| 5 | (Indonesia) (South Korea) | Ivana Lie / Rosiana Tendean; Cho Keum-shin / Park Hyun-suk | 15; 6 | 14; 18 | 15; 6 |

== Asian Zone (East) ==
The East Asian zone qualifying rounds were held from 20 to 23 February at the Queen Elizabeth Stadium in Hong Kong. Four teams competed in a round-robin format to decide which team qualifies for the final tournament.

=== Round robin ===
| Pos | Team | Pld | W | L | MF | MA | MD | Pts | Qualification |
|---|---|---|---|---|---|---|---|---|---|
| 1 | China (Q) | 3 | 3 | 0 | 15 | 0 | +15 | 3 | Final tournament |
| 2 | Hong Kong | 3 | 2 | 1 | 6 | 9 | −3 | 2 | |
| 3 | New Zealand | 3 | 1 | 2 | 6 | 9 | −3 | 1 | |
| 4 | Australia | 3 | 0 | 3 | 3 | 12 | −9 | 0 | |

Source: Singapore Monitor
(Q) Qualified to the phase indicated

China
5
Queen Elizabeth Stadium
20 February 1984

New Zealand
0

| | | | 1 | 2 | 3 |
|---|---|---|---|---|---|
| 1 | (China) (New Zealand) | Li Lingwei; Toni Whittaker | 11; 1 | 11; 1 |
| 2 | (China) (New Zealand) | Han Aiping; Linda Persson | 11; 8 | 11; 5 |
| 3 | (China) (New Zealand) | Zhang Ailing; Karen Phillips | 11; 3 | 11; 1 |
| 4 | (China) (New Zealand) | Lin Ying / Wu Dixi; Linda Persson / Toni Whittaker | 15; 2 | 15; 3 |
| 5 | (China) (New Zealand) | Wu Jianqiu / Xu Rong; Sandra Henare / Karen Phillips | 10; 2 | 5; 3 |

China
5
Queen Elizabeth Stadium
21 February 1984

Hong Kong
0

| | | | 1 | 2 | 3 |
|---|---|---|---|---|---|
| 1 | (China) (Hong Kong) | Li Lingwei; Tong Chun Mui | 11; 2 | 11; 3 |
| 2 | (China) (Hong Kong) | Han Aiping; Tam Wai | 11; 1 | 11; 2 |
| 3 | (China) (Hong Kong) | Zhang Ailing; Poon Wai Na | 11; 2 | 11; 1 |
| 4 | (China) (Hong Kong) | Lin Ying / Wu Dixi; Amy Chan / Wong Har Ping | 15; 2 | 15; 5 |
| 5 | (China) (Hong Kong) | Wu Jianqiu / Xu Rong; Chiu Mei Yin / Lina Collaco | 15; 1 | 15; 1 |

Australia
1
Queen Elizabeth Stadium
21 February 1984

New Zealand
4

| | | | 1 | 2 | 3 |
|---|---|---|---|---|---|
| 1 | (Australia) (New Zealand) | Julie McDonald; Toni Whittaker | 7; 11 | 12; 9 | 9; 12 |
| 2 | (Australia) (New Zealand) | Audrey Swaby; Linda Persson | 11; 7 | 2; 11 | 12; 9 |
| 3 | (Australia) (New Zealand) | Maxine Evans; Karen Phillips | 8; 11 | 9; 12 |
| 4 | (Australia) (New Zealand) | Julie McDonald / Audrey Swaby; Linda Persson / Toni Whittaker | 12; 15 | 16; 18 |
| 5 | (Australia) (New Zealand) | Maxine Evans / Jane Forrest; Sandra Henare / Karen Phillips | 3; 15 | 8; 15 |

Australia
2
Queen Elizabeth Stadium
22 February 1984

Hong Kong
3

| | | | 1 | 2 | 3 |
|---|---|---|---|---|---|
| 1 | (Australia) (Hong Kong) | Julie McDonald; Amy Chan | 2; 11 | 2; 11 |
| 2 | (Australia) (Hong Kong) | Audrey Swaby; Wong Har Ping | 11; 2 | 3; 11 | 8; 11 |
| 3 | (Australia) (Hong Kong) | Maxine Evans; Tong Chun Mui | 7; 11 | 12; 10 | 6; 11 |
| 4 | (Australia) (Hong Kong) | Julie McDonald / Audrey Swaby; Amy Chan / Wong Har Ping | 10; 15 | 15; 12 | 15; 12 |
| 5 | (Australia) (Hong Kong) | Maxine Evans / Jane Forrest; Chiu Mei Yin / Poon Wai Na | 16; 17 | 15; 11 | 15; 3 |

China
5
Queen Elizabeth Stadium
23 February 1984

Australia
0

| | | | 1 | 2 | 3 |
|---|---|---|---|---|---|
| 1 | (China) (Australia) | Li Lingwei; Julie McDonald | 11; 1 | 11; 4 |
| 2 | (China) (Australia) | Zhang Ailing; Audrey Swaby | 11; 3 | 11; 1 |
| 3 | (China) (Australia) | Qian Ping; Maxine Evans | 11; 1 | 11; 1 |
| 4 | (China) (Australia) | Lin Ying / Wu Dixi; Julie McDonald / Audrey Swaby | 15; 11 | 15; 4 |
| 5 | (China) (Australia) | Wu Jianqiu / Xu Rong; Maxine Evans / Jane Forrest | 15; 4 | 15; 3 |

Hong Kong
3
Queen Elizabeth Stadium
23 February 1984

New Zealand
2

| | | | 1 | 2 | 3 |
|---|---|---|---|---|---|
| 1 | (Hong Kong) (New Zealand) | Amy Chan; Toni Whittaker | 3; 11 | 2; 11 |
| 2 | (Hong Kong) (New Zealand) | Wong Har Ping; Linda Persson | 11; 6 | 11; 2 |
| 3 | (Hong Kong) (New Zealand) | Tong Chun Mui; Karen Phillips | 7; 11 | 11; 4 | 11; 6 |
| 4 | (Hong Kong) (New Zealand) | Amy Chan / Wong Har Ping; Linda Persson / Toni Whittaker | 15; 6 | 15; 10 |
| 5 | (Hong Kong) (New Zealand) | Poon Wai Na / Tong Chun Mui; Sandra Henare / Karen Phillips | 17; 15 | 16; 18 | 5; 15 |

== European Zone ==
The European qualifying rounds were held in the Koninklijke Stallingen in Ostend, Belgium. Eight teams took part in qualifying for the final tournament.

=== Group stage ===
==== Group A ====
| Pos | Team | Pld | W | L | MF | MA | MD | Pts | Qualification |
|---|---|---|---|---|---|---|---|---|---|
| 1 | England | 3 | 3 | 0 | 14 | 1 | +13 | 3 | Advance to knockout stage |
| 2 | Scotland | 3 | 2 | 1 | 9 | 6 | +3 | 2 | Advance to knockout stage |
| 3 | West Germany | 3 | 1 | 2 | 6 | 9 | −3 | 1 | |
| 4 | Belgium | 3 | 0 | 3 | 1 | 14 | −13 | 0 | |

Source: The Straits Times

Scotland
4
Koninklijke Stallingen
23 February 1984

Belgium
1

| | | | 1 | 2 | 3 |
|---|---|---|---|---|---|
| 1 | (Scotland) (Belgium) | Alison Fulton; Ingrid Swiggers | 11; 3 | 11; 0 |
| 2 | (Scotland) (Belgium) | Pamela Hamilton; Annick Bouquiaux | 11; 3 | 11; 0 |
| 3 | (Scotland) (Belgium) | Susan Bell; Marie-Christine Donnay | 11; 4 | 11; 1 |
| 4 | (Scotland) (Belgium) | Alison Fulton / Morag Johnson; Ingrid Swiggers / Greet van Haverbeke | 9; 15 | 9; 15 |
| 5 | (Scotland) (Belgium) | Elinor Allen / Pamela Hamilton; Nancy de Mey / Sabine Langenaekens | 15; 1 | 15; 2 |

England
5
Koninklijke Stallingen
23 February 1984

West Germany
0

| | | | 1 | 2 | 3 |
|---|---|---|---|---|---|
| 1 | (England) (West Germany) | Helen Troke; Heidi Krickhaus | 11; 4 | 11; 7 |
| 2 | (England) (West Germany) | Karen Beckman; Gabriele Sadewater | 11; 2 | 11; 2 |
| 3 | (England) (West Germany) | Jane Webster; Christa Hökel | 11; 0 | 11; 6 |
| 4 | (England) (West Germany) | Karen Beckman / Gillian Gilks; Mechtild Hagemann / Heidi Krickhaus | 15; 9 | 15; 6 |
| 5 | (England) (West Germany) | Barbara Sutton / Jane Webster; Cathrin Hoppe / Gabriele Sadewater | 15; 5 | 15; 11 |

England
5
Koninklijke Stallingen
23 February 1984

Belgium
0

| | | | 1 | 2 | 3 |
|---|---|---|---|---|---|
| 1 | (England) (Belgium) | Karen Beckman; Ingrid Swiggers | 11; 3 | 11; 3 |
| 2 | (England) (Belgium) | Jane Webster; Nancy de Mey | 11; 3 | 11; 3 |
| 3 | (England) (Belgium) | Fiona Elliott; Annick Bouquiaux | 11; 1 | 11; 2 |
| 4 | (England) (Belgium) | Barbara Sutton / Jane Webster; Ingrid Swiggers / Greet van Haverbeke | 15; 9 | 15; 8 |
| 5 | (England) (Belgium) | Karen Chapman / Helen Troke; Nancy de Mey / Sabine Langenaekens | 15; 0 | 15; 1 |

Scotland
4
Koninklijke Stallingen
23 February 1984

West Germany
1

| | | | 1 | 2 | 3 |
|---|---|---|---|---|---|
| 1 | (Scotland) (West Germany) | Alison Fulton; Heidi Krickhaus | 6; 11 | 10; 12 |
| 2 | (Scotland) (West Germany) | Pamela Hamilton; Cathrin Hoppe | 11; 2 | 11; 2 |
| 3 | (Scotland) (West Germany) | Susan Bell; Christa Hökel | 11; 3 | 11; 3 |
| 4 | (Scotland) (West Germany) | Alison Fulton / Morag Johnson; Mechtild Hagemann / Christa Hökel | 15; 10 | 15; 6 |
| 5 | (Scotland) (West Germany) | Elinor Allen / Pamela Hamilton; Cathrin Hoppe / Gabriele Sadewater | 15; 10 | 15; 9 |

England
4
Koninklijke Stallingen
24 February 1984

Scotland
1

| | | | 1 | 2 | 3 |
|---|---|---|---|---|---|
| 1 | (England) (Scotland) | Helen Troke; Alison Fulton | 11; 1 | 11; 1 |
| 2 | (England) (Scotland) | Karen Beckman; Pamela Hamilton | 11; 5 | 11; 4 |
| 3 | (England) (Scotland) | Jane Webster; Susan Bell | 11; 1 | 11; 3 |
| 4 | (England) (Scotland) | Karen Beckman / Gillian Gilks; Alison Fulton / Pamela Hamilton | 15; 9 | 15; 4 |
| 5 | (England) (Scotland) | Karen Chapman / Helen Troke; Elinor Allen / Morag Johnson | 15; 2 | 15; 4 |

West Germany
5
Koninklijke Stallingen
24 February 1984

Belgium
0

| | | | 1 | 2 | 3 |
|---|---|---|---|---|---|
| 1 | (West Germany) (Belgium) | Heidi Krickhaus; Ingrid Swiggers | 11; 6 | 11; 5 |
| 2 | (West Germany) (Belgium) | Cathrin Hoppe; Nancy de Mey | 11; 3 | 11; 3 |
| 3 | (West Germany) (Belgium) | Gabriele Sadewater; Greet van Haverbeke | 11; 8 | 11; 5 |
| 4 | (West Germany) (Belgium) | Mechtild Hagemann / Heidi Krickhaus; Ingrid Swiggers / Greet van Haverbeke | 15; 6 | 14; 17 | 15; 7 |
| 5 | (West Germany) (Belgium) | Cathrin Hoppe / Gabriele Sadewater; Annick Bouquiaux / Marie-Christine Donnay | 15; 9 | 18; 13 |

==== Group B ====
| Pos | Team | Pld | W | L | MF | MA | MD | Pts | Qualification |
|---|---|---|---|---|---|---|---|---|---|
| 1 | Denmark | 3 | 3 | 0 | 12 | 3 | +9 | 3 | Advance to knockout stage |
| 2 | Sweden | 3 | 2 | 1 | 9 | 6 | +3 | 2 | Advance to knockout stage |
| 3 | Netherlands | 3 | 1 | 2 | 9 | 6 | +3 | 1 | |
| 4 | Iceland | 3 | 0 | 3 | 0 | 15 | −15 | 0 | |

Source: The Straits Times

Denmark
3
Koninklijke Stallingen
23 February 1984

Netherlands
2

| | | | 1 | 2 | 3 |
|---|---|---|---|---|---|
| 1 | (Denmark) (Netherlands) | Kirsten Larsen; Eline Coene | 11; 8 | 11; 2 |
| 2 | (Denmark) (Netherlands) | Agnethe Juul; Astrid van der Knaap | 6; 11 | 5; 11 |
| 3 | (Denmark) (Netherlands) | Dorte Kjær; Grace Kakiay | 11; 1 | 11; 4 |
| 4 | (Denmark) (Netherlands) | Inge Borgstrøm / Grete Mogensen; Eline Coene / Marjan Ridder | 13; 15 | 15; 12 | 15; 18 |
| 5 | (Denmark) (Netherlands) | Dorte Kjær / Kirsten Larsen; Paula Kloet / Karin van der Valk | 15; 10 | 15; 12 |

Sweden
5
Koninklijke Stallingen
23 February 1984

Iceland
0

| | | | 1 | 2 | 3 |
|---|---|---|---|---|---|
| 1 | (Sweden) (Iceland) | Christine Magnusson; Þórdís Edwald | 11; 2 | 11; 2 |
| 2 | (Sweden) (Iceland) | Maria Bengtsson; Elisabet Þórðardóttir | 11; 0 | 11; 1 |
| 3 | (Sweden) (Iceland) | Lena Staxler; Inga Kjartansdóttir | 11; 0 | 11; 1 |
| 4 | (Sweden) (Iceland) | Maria Bengtsson / Christine Magnusson; Kristín Kristjánsdóttir / Kristín Magnúsdóttir | 15; 13 | 15; 8 |
| 5 | (Sweden) (Iceland) | Anette Börjesson / Karin Wilhelmsson; Þórdís Edwald / Elisabet Þórðardóttir | 15; 5 | 15; 3 |

Denmark
5
Koninklijke Stallingen
23 February 1984

Iceland
0

| | | | 1 | 2 | 3 |
|---|---|---|---|---|---|
| 1 | (Denmark) (Iceland) | Agnethe Juul; Þórdís Edwald | 11; 4 | 11; 1 |
| 2 | (Denmark) (Iceland) | Rikke von Sørensen; Kristín Magnúsdóttir | 11; 3 | 11; 1 |
| 3 | (Denmark) (Iceland) | Grete Mogensen; Elisabet Þórðardóttir | 11; 2 | 11; 1 |
| 4 | (Denmark) (Iceland) | Hanne Adsbøl / Kirsten Larsen; Kristín Kristjánsdóttir / Kristín Magnúsdóttir | 15; 4 | 15; 3 |
| 5 | (Denmark) (Iceland) | Liselotte Gøttsche / Grete Mogensen; Þórdís Edwald / Inga Kjartansdóttir | 15; 8 | 15; 1 |

Sweden
3
Koninklijke Stallingen
23 February 1984

Netherlands
2

| | | | 1 | 2 | 3 |
|---|---|---|---|---|---|
| 1 | (Sweden) (Netherlands) | Christine Magnusson; Eline Coene | 11; 2 | 12; 9 |
| 2 | (Sweden) (Netherlands) | Maria Bengtsson; Astrid van der Knaap | 5; 11 | 11; 6 | 11; 12 |
| 3 | (Sweden) (Netherlands) | Lena Staxler; Marjan Ridder | 11; 3 | 12; 9 |
| 4 | (Sweden) (Netherlands) | Maria Bengtsson / Christine Magnusson; Paula Kloet / Karin van der Valk | 15; 13 | 15; 8 |
| 5 | (Sweden) (Netherlands) | Anette Börjesson / Karin Wilhelmsson; Eline Coene / Marjan Ridder | 6; 15 | 8; 15 |

Denmark
4
Koninklijke Stallingen
24 February 1984

Sweden
1

| | | | 1 | 2 | 3 |
|---|---|---|---|---|---|
| 1 | (Denmark) (Sweden) | Kirsten Larsen; Christine Magnusson | 11; 1 | 11; 3 |
| 2 | (Denmark) (Sweden) | Rikke von Sørensen; Maria Bengtsson | 11; 6 | 11; 1 |
| 3 | (Denmark) (Sweden) | Dorte Kjær; Lena Staxler | 11; 2 | 11; 7 |
| 4 | (Denmark) (Sweden) | Dorte Kjær / Kirsten Larsen; Maria Bengtsson / Christine Magnusson | 5; 15 | 16; 17 |
| 5 | (Denmark) (Sweden) | Liselotte Gøttsche / Grete Mogensen; Anette Börjesson / Karin Wilhelmsson | 15; 3 | 15; 3 |

Netherlands
5
Koninklijke Stallingen
24 February 1984

Iceland
0

| | | | 1 | 2 | 3 |
|---|---|---|---|---|---|
| 1 | (Netherlands) (Iceland) | Eline Coene; Þórdís Edwald | 11; 0 | 11; 1 |
| 2 | (Netherlands) (Iceland) | Grace Kakiay; Kristín Magnúsdóttir | 11; 5 | 11; 6 |
| 3 | (Netherlands) (Iceland) | Marjan Ridder; Elisabet Þórðardóttir | 11; 5 | 11; 3 |
| 4 | (Netherlands) (Iceland) | Paula Kloet / Karin van der Valk; Kristín Kristjánsdóttir / Kristín Magnúsdóttir | 15; 7 | 15; 3 |
| 5 | (Netherlands) (Iceland) | Eline Coene / Marjan Ridder; Þórdís Edwald / Inga Kjartansdóttir | 15; 3 | 15; 0 |

=== Knockout stage ===
Semi-finals
England | 4
Sweden | 1
Scotland | 0
Denmark | 5

Final
England | 4
Denmark | 1
Third place
Sweden | 3
Scotland | 2

==== Semi-finals ====
Denmark
5
Koninklijke Stallingen
25 February 1984

Scotland
0

| | | | 1 | 2 | 3 |
|---|---|---|---|---|---|
| 1 | (Denmark) (Scotland) | Kirsten Larsen; Alison Fulton | 11; 4 | 11; 4 |
| 2 | (Denmark) (Scotland) | Rikke von Sørensen; Pamela Hamilton | 12; 11 | 11; 0 |
| 3 | (Denmark) (Scotland) | Dorte Kjær; Susan Bell | 11; 5 | 11; 3 |
| 4 | (Denmark) (Scotland) | Hanne Adsbøl / Kirsten Larsen; Alison Fulton / Morag Johnson | 13; 4 | 11; 11 |
| 5 | (Denmark) (Scotland) | Liselotte Gøttsche / Grete Mogensen; Elinor Allen / Pamela Hamilton | 15; 5 | 15; 10 |

England
4
Koninklijke Stallingen
25 February 1984

Sweden
1

| | | | 1 | 2 | 3 |
|---|---|---|---|---|---|
| 1 | (England) (Sweden) | Helen Troke; Christine Magnusson | 11; 2 | 11; 7 |
| 2 | (England) (Sweden) | Karen Beckman; Maria Bengtsson | 11; 7 | 6; 11 | 11; 0 |
| 3 | (England) (Sweden) | Jane Webster; Lena Staxler | 11; 5 | 11; 8 |
| 4 | (England) (Sweden) | Karen Beckman / Gillian Gilks; Maria Bengtsson / Christine Magnusson | 15; 10 | 12; 15 | 10; 15 |
| 5 | (England) (Sweden) | Barbara Sutton / Jane Webster; Anette Börjesson / Ingrid Johansson | 15; 8 | 15; 8 |

==== Third place ====
Sweden
3
Koninklijke Stallingen
26 February 1984

Scotland
2

| | | | 1 | 2 | 3 |
|---|---|---|---|---|---|
| 1 | (Sweden) (Scotland) | Christine Magnusson; Alison Fulton | 11; 8 | 12; 3 |
| 2 | (Sweden) (Scotland) | Maria Bengtsson; Pamela Hamilton | 7; 11 | 5; 11 |
| 3 | (Sweden) (Scotland) | Lena Staxler; Elinor Allen | 11; 2 | 11; 3 |
| 4 | (Sweden) (Scotland) | Maria Bengtsson / Christine Magnusson; Alison Fulton / Morag Johnson | 14; 17 | 15; 6 | 15; 7 |
| 5 | (Sweden) (Scotland) | Anette Börjesson / Ingrid Johansson; Elinor Allen / Pamela Hamilton | 18; 13 | 12; 15 | 6; 15 |

==== Final ====
England
4
Koninklijke Stallingen
26 February 1984

Denmark
1

| | | | 1 | 2 | 3 |
|---|---|---|---|---|---|
| 1 | (England) (Denmark) | Helen Troke; Kirsten Larsen | 11; 2 | 11; 2 |
| 2 | (England) (Denmark) | Jane Webster; Dorte Kjær | 12; 11 | 4; 11 | 11; 5 |
| 3 | (England) (Denmark) | Karen Beckman; Rikke von Sørensen | 11; 8 | 11; 7 |
| 4 | (England) (Denmark) | Karen Beckman / Gillian Gilks; Dorte Kjær / Kirsten Larsen | 15; 4 | 11; 15 | 18; 16 |
| 5 | (England) (Denmark) | Barbara Sutton / Jane Webster; Liselotte Gøttsche / Grete Mogensen | 8; 15 | 15; 10 | 12; 15 |

== Pan American Zone ==
The qualifying rounds for the Pan American zone were held at the Humber College Athletic Center in Toronto, Canada. Nigeria withdrew from the final tournament.

=== Round robin ===
| Pos | Team | Pld | W | L | MF | MA | MD | Pts | Qualification |
|---|---|---|---|---|---|---|---|---|---|
| 1 | Canada (Q) | 3 | 3 | 0 | 14 | 1 | +13 | 3 | Final tournament |
| 2 | Chinese Taipei | 3 | 2 | 1 | 11 | 4 | +7 | 2 | |
| 3 | United States | 3 | 1 | 2 | 3 | 12 | −9 | 1 | |
| 4 | Peru | 3 | 0 | 3 | 2 | 13 | −11 | 0 | |
| 5 | Nigeria | 0 | 0 | 0 | 0 | 0 | 0 | 0 | Withdrew |

Source: The Straits Times
(Q) Qualified to the phase indicated

United States
0
Humber College
22 February 1984

Chinese Taipei
5

| | | | 1 | 2 | 3 |
|---|---|---|---|---|---|
| 1 | (United States) (Chinese Taipei) | Cheryl Carton; Liu Hsiu-ying | 11; 7 | 6; 11 | 5; 11 |
| 2 | (United States) (Chinese Taipei) | Judianne Kelly; Lin Hui-hsu | 2; 11 | 2; 11 |
| 3 | (United States) (Chinese Taipei) | Joy Kitzmiller; Chen Yu-jen | 2; 11 | 8; 11 |
| 4 | (United States) (Chinese Taipei) | Tracy Britton / Cheryl Carton; Kang Chia-yi / Sun Tsai-ching | 14; 17 | 8; 15 |
| 5 | (United States) (Chinese Taipei) | Nancy Narcowich / Monica Ortez; Huang Hsiu-chih / Liu Hsiu-ying | 0; 15 | 8; 15 |

Canada
5
Humber College
22 February 1984

Peru
0

| | | | 1 | 2 | 3 |
|---|---|---|---|---|---|
| 1 | (Canada) (Peru) | Denyse Julien; Gloria Jiménez | 11; 6 | 11; 0 |
| 2 | (Canada) (Peru) | Wendy Carter; Silvia Jiménez | 11; 2 | 11; 1 |
| 3 | (Canada) (Peru) | Claire Backhouse; Ximena Bellido | 11; 6 | 11; 1 |
| 4 | (Canada) (Peru) | Claire Backhouse / Johanne Falardeau; Gloria Jiménez / Silvia Jiménez | 15; 3 | 15; 3 |
| 5 | (Canada) (Peru) | Linda Cloutier / Denyse Julien; Carmen Bellido / Ximena Bellido | 15; 7 | 11; 11 |

Canada
5
Humber College
23 February 1984

United States
0

| | | | 1 | 2 | 3 |
|---|---|---|---|---|---|
| 1 | (Canada) (United States) | Denyse Julien; Cheryl Carton | 11; 4 | 11; 1 |
| 2 | (Canada) (United States) | Wendy Carter; Judianne Kelly | 11; 1 | 11; 3 |
| 3 | (Canada) (United States) | Claire Backhouse; Ann French | 11; 3 | 11; 3 |
| 4 | (Canada) (United States) | Claire Backhouse / Johanne Falardeau; Tracy Britton / Monica Ortez | 15; 5 | 15; 7 |
| 5 | (Canada) (United States) | Linda Cloutier / Denyse Julien; Judianne Kelly / Joy Kitzmiller | 15; 8 | 15; 3 |

Chinese Taipei
5
Humber College
23 February 1984

Peru
0

| | | | 1 | 2 | 3 |
|---|---|---|---|---|---|
| 1 | (Chinese Taipei) (Peru) | Liu Hsiu-ying; Gloria Jiménez | 11; 7 | 11; 1 |
| 2 | (Chinese Taipei) (Peru) | Lin Hui-hsu; Silvia Jiménez | 12; 10 | 11; 0 |
| 3 | (Chinese Taipei) (Peru) | Chen Yu-jen; Ximena Bellido | 11; 1 | 11; 1 |
| 4 | (Chinese Taipei) (Peru) | Kang Chia-yi / Sun Tsai-ching; Gloria Jiménez / Silvia Jiménez | 15; 6 | 15; 6 |
| 5 | (Chinese Taipei) (Peru) | Huang Hsiu-chih / Liu Hsiu-ying; Carmen Bellido / Ximena Bellido | 15; 1 | 15; 6 |

United States
3
Humber College
24 February 1984

Peru
2

| | | | 1 | 2 | 3 |
|---|---|---|---|---|---|---|
| 1 | (United States) (Peru) | Cheryl Carton; Gloria Jiménez | 11; 8 | 11; 9 |
| 2 | (United States) (Peru) | Judianne Kelly; Silvia Jiménez | 11; 4 | 11; 5 |
| 3 | (United States) (Peru) | Ann French; Ximena Bellido | 3; 11 | 1; 11 |
| 4 | (United States) (Peru) | Tracy Britton / Judianne Kelly; Gloria Jiménez / Silvia Jiménez | 11; 15 | 15; 6 | 15; 11 |
| 5 | (United States) (Peru) | Nancy Narcowich / Monica Ortez; Ximena Bellido / Carmen Bellido | 5; 0 | | | retired |

Canada
4
Humber College
24 February 1984

Chinese Taipei
1

| | | | 1 | 2 | 3 |
|---|---|---|---|---|---|
| 1 | (Canada) (Chinese Taipei) | Denyse Julien; Liu Hsiu-ying | 11; 4 | 11; 0 |
| 2 | (Canada) (Chinese Taipei) | Wendy Carter; Lin Hui-hsu | 11; 7 | 7; 11 | 5; 11 |
| 3 | (Canada) (Chinese Taipei) | Claire Backhouse; Chen Yu-jen | 8; 11 | 11; 2 | 11; 5 |
| 4 | (Canada) (Chinese Taipei) | Claire Backhouse / Johanne Falardeau; Kang Chia-yi / Sun Tsai-ching | 15; 7 | 13; 15 | 15; 11 |
| 5 | (Canada) (Chinese Taipei) | Linda Cloutier / Denyse Julien; Huang Hsiu-chih / Liu Hsiu-ying | 15; 7 | 15; 13 |
