= Nigel Tier =

English badminton player

Personal information
- Full name: Nigel G Tier
- Born: 3 October 1958 (age 68)

Sport
- Country: England
- Sport: Badminton
- Handedness: Right
- Event: Men's and Mixed doubles
Medal record
Men's badminton
Representing England
World Championships
Bronze medal – third place	1985 Calgary	Mixed doubles
Commonwealth Games
Gold medal – first place	1986 Edinburgh	Mixed team
Silver medal – second place	1986 Edinburgh	Men's doubles
European Championships
Gold medal – first place	1984 Preston	Mixed team
Silver medal – second place	1986 Uppsala	Mixed doubles
Silver medal – second place	1986 Uppsala	Mixed team
Bronze medal – third place	1984 Preston	Mixed doubles
European Junior Championships
Gold medal – first place	1977 Ta' Qali	Mixed doubles
Gold medal – first place	1977 Ta' Qali	Mixed team
Silver medal – second place	1977 Ta' Qali	Boys' doubles

Nigel G Tier (born 3 October 1958) is an English retired badminton player.

== Career ==
He won the bronze medal at the 1985 IBF World Championships in mixed doubles with Gillian Gowers.

Tier represented England and won a gold medal in the team event and a silver medal in the men's doubles with Andy Goode, at the 1986 Commonwealth Games in Edinburgh, Scotland.

== Achievements ==
=== World Championships ===
Mixed doubles
Year	Venue	Partner	Opponent	Score	Result
1985	Olympic Saddledome, Calgary, Canada	(England) Gillian Gowers	(South Korea) Park Joo-bong (South Korea) Yoo Sang-hee	4–15, 8–15	Bronze

=== Commonwealth Games ===
Men's doubles
Year	Venue	Partner	Opponent	Score	Result
1986	Meadowbank Sports Centre; Edinburgh, Scotland	(England) Andy Goode	(Scotland) Billy Gilliland (Scotland) Dan Travers	8–15, 5–15	Silver

=== European Championships ===
Mixed doubles
Year	Venue	Partner	Opponent	Score	Result
1984	Guild Hall, Preston, England	(England) Gillian Clark	(England) Martin Dew (England) Gillian Gilks	11–15, 8–15	Bronze
1986	Fyrishallen, Uppsala, Sweden	(England) Gillian Gowers	(England) Martin Dew (England) Gillian Gilks	6–15, 8–15	Silver

=== European Junior Championships ===
Boys' doubles
Year	Venue	Partner	Opponent	Score	Result
1977	RAF Ta Kali, Ta'Qali, Malta	(England) Kevin Jolly	(Denmark) Jesper Toftlund (Denmark) Niels Christensen	Walkover	Silver

Mixed doubles
Year	Venue	Partner	Opponent	Score	Result
1977	RAF Ta Kali, Ta'Qali, Malta	(England) Karen Puttick	(England) Kevin Jolly (England) Karen Bridge	Walkover	Gold

=== IBF Grand Prix ===
The World Badminton Grand Prix was sanctioned by International Badminton Federation (IBF) from 1983 to 2006.

Men's doubles
Year	Tournament	Partner	Opponent	Score	Result
1984	Scottish Open	(England) Duncan Bridge	(Denmark) Morten Frost (Denmark) Jesper Helledie	11–15, 11–15	(silver) Runner-up
1984	German Open	(England) Duncan Bridge	(England) Martin Dew (England) Mike Tredgett	9–15, 15–7, 17–18	(silver) Runner-up
1985	English Masters	(England) Andy Goode	(China) Chen Kang (China) Zhang Qingwu	15–7, 15–9	(gold) Winner

Mixed doubles
Year	Tournament	Partner	Opponent	Score	Result
1984	All England Open	(England) Gillian Gowers	(England) Martin Dew (England) Gillian Gilks	8–15, 3–15	(silver) Runner-up
1984	Malaysia Open	(England) Gillian Gowers	(England) Martin Dew (England) Gillian Gilks	6–15, 5–15	(silver) Runner-up
1984	Canada Open	(England) Gillian Gowers	(Scotland) Billy Gilliland (England) Karen Chapman	15–3, 15–8	(gold) Winner
1985	German Open	(England) Gillian Gowers	(England) Martin Dew (England) Gillian Gilks	15–12, 4–15, 13–15	(silver) Runner-up
1985	Indonesia Open	(England) Gillian Gowers	(England) Martin Dew (England) Gillian Gilks	12–15, 0–15	(silver) Runner-up
1985	Scandinavian Cup	(England) Gillian Gowers	(Sweden) Stefan Karlsson (Sweden) Maria Bengtsson	8–15, 15–5, 15–11	(gold) Winner
1986	Japan Open	(England) Gillian Gowers	(Scotland) Billy Gilliland (England) Nora Perry	15–17, 9–15	(silver) Runner-up
1986	China Open	(England) Gillian Gowers	(South Korea) Park Joo-bong (South Korea) Chung Myung-hee	4–15, 5–15	(silver) Runner-up
1986	Carlton-Intersport-Cup	(England) Gillian Gowers	(England) Martin Dew (England) Gillian Gilks	12–15, 4–15	(silver) Runner-up
1986	World Grand Prix Finals	(England) Gillian Gowers	(Sweden) Thomas Kihlström (Sweden) Christine Magnusson	15–8, 18–15	(gold) Winner

=== International tournaments ===
Men's doubles
Year	Tournament	Partner	Opponent	Score	Result
1981	Polish International	(England) Mike Cattermole	(Czech Republic) Michal Malý (Czech Republic) Karel Lakomý	10–15, 15–5, 10–15	(silver) Runner-up
1981	French Open	(England) Norman Goode	(England) Andy Goode (England) Steve Baddeley		(silver) Runner-up
1981	Czechoslovakian International	(England) Steve Butler	(Soviet Union) Anatoliy Skripko (Soviet Union) Evgeniy Dayanov	15–2, 15–3	(gold) Winner
1983	Welsh International	(England) Duncan Bridge	(England) Martin Dew (England) Mike Tredgett	14–18, 9–15	(silver) Runner-up
1983	Bell's Open	(England) Duncan Bridge	(England) Andy Goode (England) Darell Roebuck	15–8, 15–2	(gold) Winner
1983	Victor Cup	(England) Duncan Bridge	(Sweden) Stefan Karlsson (Sweden) Torbjörn Pettersson	15–8, 15–9	(gold) Winner
1984	Scottish Open	(England) Andy Goode	(Denmark) Morten Frost (Denmark) Jens Peter Nierhoff	15–12, 8–15, 15–9	(gold) Winner
1984	Victor Cup	(England) Andy Goode	(England) Dipak Tailor (England) Chris Dobson	11–15, 12–15	(silver) Runner-up

Mixed doubles
Year	Tournament	Partner	Opponent	Score	Result
1981	Polish International	(England) Catharine Troke	(Poland) Bożena Wojtkowska (Poland) Ewa Rusznica	15–4, 15–3	(gold) Winner
1981	French Open	(Scotland) Alison Fulton			(gold) Winner
1983	Victor Cup	(England) Gillian Gowers	(England) Duncan Bridge (England) Karen Beckman	15–12, 15–8	(gold) Winner
1984	Bell's Open	(England) Gillian Gowers	(Scotland) Billy Gilliland (England) Karen Chapman	16–17, 13–15	(silver) Runner-up
1983	Victor Cup	(England) Karen Chapman	(Canada) Mike Butler (Canada) Claire Backhouse	18–13, 15–9	(gold) Winner
