= Sally Podger =

English badminton player

Personal information
- Born: Sally Leadbeater; 8 February 1962 (age 64) Guernsey, United Kingdom

Sport
- Country: England
- Sport: Badminton
Medal record
Women's badminton
Representing England
World Cup
Bronze medal – third place	1983 Kuala Lumpur	Mixed doubles
Uber Cup
Silver medal – second place	1984 Kuala Lumpur	Women's team
Commonwealth Games
Gold medal – first place	1982 Brisbane	Mixed team
Silver medal – second place	1982 Brisbane	Women's singles
Bronze medal – third place	1982 Brisbane	Women's doubles
European Championships
Gold medal – first place	1984 Preston	Mixed team
Silver medal – second place	1984 Preston	Women's singles
European Junior Championships
Gold medal – first place	1979 Mülheim	Girls' doubles
Silver medal – second place	1979 Mülheim	Mixed team

Sally Podger (born 8 February 1962 as Sally Leadbeater) is an English badminton player.

== Early and personal life ==
Podger grew up in Guernsey. At the age of 18, she moved to Portsmouth to gain more badminton experience. She married Andrew Podger on 6 August 1981 in Vale Paris Church, Guernsey.

== Badminton career ==
Podger represented England and won a gold medal in the team event, a silver medal in the singles and a bronze medal in the doubles, at the 1982 Commonwealth Games in Brisbane, Queensland, Australia.

== Achievements ==
=== World Cup ===
Mixed doubles
Year	Venue	Partner	Opponent	Score	Result
1983	Stadium Negara, Kuala Lumpur, Malaysia	(Denmark) Jesper Helledie	(England) Martin Dew (England) Gillian Gilks	9–15, 7–15	Bronze

=== Commonwealth Games ===
Women's singles
Year	Venue	Opponent	Score	Result
1982	Chandler Sports Hall, Brisbane, Australia	(England) Helen Troke	11–4, 3–11, 5–11	Silver

Women's doubles
Year	Venue	Partner	Opponent	Score	Result
1982	Chandler Sports Hall, Brisbane, Australia	(England) Karen Chapman	(India) Ami Ghia (India) Kanwal Thakur Singh	11–15, 15–6, 15–8	Bronze

=== European Championships ===
Women's singles
Year	Venue	Opponent	Score	Result
1984	Guild Hall, Preston, England	(England) Helen Troke	5–11, 2–11	Silver

=== European Junior Championships ===
Girls' doubles
Year	Venue	Partner	Opponent	Score	Result
1979	Carl Diem Halle; Mülheim an der Ruhr, West Germany	(England) Gillian Clark	(Denmark) Charlotte Pilgaard (Denmark) Bettina Kristensen	15–12, 15–9	Gold

=== IBF World Grand Prix ===
The World Badminton Grand Prix sanctioned by International Badminton Federation (IBF) since 1983.

Women's singles
Year	Tournament	Opponent	Score	Result
1983	Scottish Open	(Scotland) Gillian Martin	11–4, 10–12, 11–0	(gold) Winner
1983	Dutch Open	(Denmark) Nettie Nielsen	11–7, 11–3	(gold) Winner
1984	Scottish Open	(England) Gillian Gowers	11–7, 11–5	(gold) Winner

Women's doubles
Year	Tournament	Partner	Opponent	Score	Result
1983	Scottish Open	(England) Karen Chapman	(England) Karen Beckman (England) Barbara Sutton	12–15, 6–15	(silver) Runner-up
1983	Dutch Open	(England) Karen Chapman	(England) Gillian Clark (England) Gillian Gilks	8–15, 16–17	(silver) Runner-up
1983	Canadian Open	(England) Karen Beckman	(Canada) Claire Backhouse-Sharpe (Canada) Johanne Falardeau	18–14, 10–15, 15–4	(gold) Winner

=== IBF International ===
Women's singles
Year	Tournament	Opponent	Score	Result
1984	Irish Open	(Scotland) Alison Fulton	11–2, 11–2	(gold) Winner
1985	Belgian International	(Netherlands) Erica van Dijck	11–7, 11–2	(gold) Winner

Women's doubles
Year	Tournament	Partner	Opponent	Score	Result
1984	Irish Open	(England) Barbara Sutton	(Scotland) Alison Fulton (Northern Ireland) Barbara Beckett	15–10, 14–18, 17–14	(gold) Winner
1984	Bell's Open	(England) Karen Chapman	(England) Gillian Gowers (England) Helen Troke	6–15, 15–3, 14–18	(silver) Runner-up
1985	Belgian International	(Sweden) Lena Staxler	(Netherlands) Carol Liem (Netherlands) Jeanette van Driel	15–5, 15–4	(gold) Winner

=== International tournaments ===
Women's singles
Year	Tournament	Opponent	Score	Result
1979	Czechoslovakian International	(Denmark) Kirsten Larsen	9–12, 6–11	(silver) Runner-up
1979	Irish Open	(England) Paula Kilvington	walkover	(gold) Winner
1979	Victor Cup	(West Germany) Heidi Krickhaus		(gold) Winner
1980	German Open	(Denmark) Pia Nielsen	7–11, 11–7, 2–11	(silver) Runner-up
1980	Welsh International	(England) Gillian Gilks	3–11, 2–11	(silver) Runner-up
1981	German Open	(Japan) Hiroe Yuki	11–12, 9–11	(silver) Runner-up
1981	Welsh International	(England) Karen Beckman	6–11, 9–12	(silver) Runner-up
1981	Bell's Open	(England) Gillian Gilks	11–0, 12–10	(gold) Winner
1982	Chinese Taipei Open	(Indonesia) Ivana Lie	10–12, 11–3, 10–12	(silver) Runner-up
1982	Welsh International	(England) Karen Beckman	11–8, 11–5	(gold) Winner
1982	Canadian Open	(England) Gillian Gilks	8–11, 11–7, 11–6	(gold) Winner
1982	Victor Cup	(China) Guan Weizhen	3–11, 4–11	(silver) Runner-up

Women's doubles
Year	Tournament	Partner	Opponent	Score	Result
1979	Czechoslovakian International	(England) Gillian Clark	(Denmark) Kirsten Larsen (Denmark) Charlotte Pilgaard	15–9, 15–5	(gold) Winner
1979	Victor Cup	(England) Gillian Clark	(England) Kathleen Redhead (Scotland) Gillian Martin		(silver) Runner-up
1980	German Open	(England) Gillian Clark	(England) Karen Chapman (England) Jane Webster	9–15, 5–15	(silver) Runner-up
1981	Swedish Open	(England) Nora Perry	(Japan) Kimiko Jinnai (Japan) Kazuko Takamine	15–6, 15–6	(gold) Winner
1981	Welsh International	(England) Karen Chapman	(Netherlands) Marjan Ridder (Netherlands) Karin Duijvestijn	15–10, 15–2	(gold) Winner
1981	German Open	(England) Karen Chapman	(England) Gillian Gilks (England) Paula Kilvington	8–15, 7–15	(silver) Runner-up
1981	Bell's Open	(England) Karen Chapman	(England) Gillian Gilks (England) Nora Perry	7–15, 13–15	(silver) Runner-up
1982	Welsh International	(England) Karen Chapman	(England) Nora Perry (England) Jane Webster	8–15, 14–17	(silver) Runner-up
