= Karen Chapman (badminton) =

English badminton player

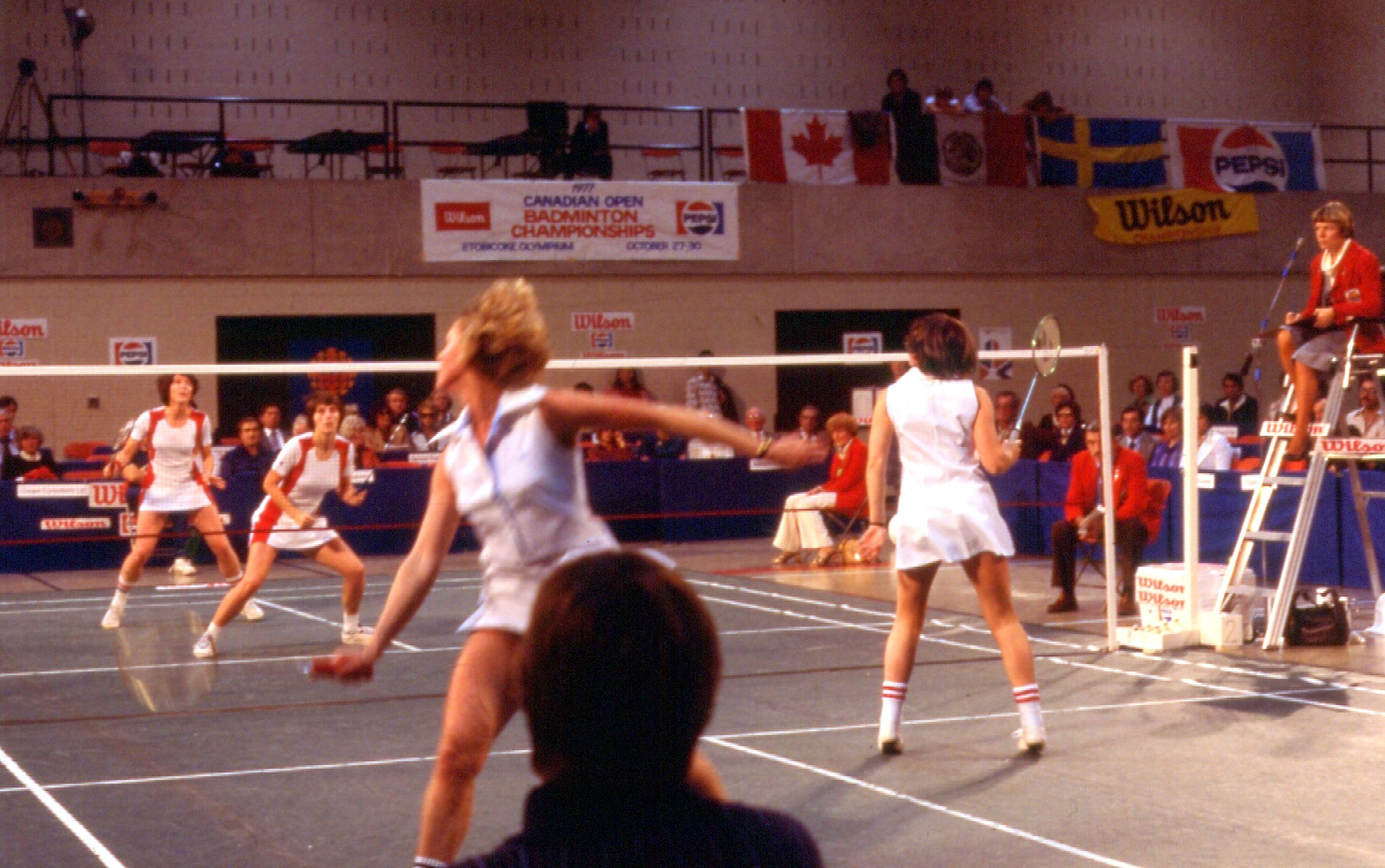

Personal information
- Born: 21 May 1959 (age 67)

Sport
- Country: England
- Sport: Badminton
- Handedness: Right
- Event: Women's doubles & Mixed doubles
Medal record
Women's badminton
Representing England
World Championships
Bronze medal – third place	1983 Copenhagen	Mixed doubles
World Cup
Bronze medal – third place	1983 Kuala Lumpur	Mixed doubles
Commonwealth Games
Gold medal – first place	1982 Brisbane	Mixed team
Gold medal – first place	1982 Brisbane	Mixed doubles
Bronze medal – third place	1982 Brisbane	Women's doubles
European Championships
Gold medal – first place	1984 Preston	Women's doubles
Gold medal – first place	1984 Preston	Mixed team
Silver medal – second place	1980 Groningen	Mixed team
Bronze medal – third place	1980 Groningen	Mixed doubles
Bronze medal – third place	1984 Preston	Mixed doubles
European Junior Championships
Gold medal – first place	1975 Copenhagen	Mixed doubles
Gold medal – first place	1977 Ta' Qali	Girls' doubles
Gold medal – first place	1977 Ta' Qali	Mixed doubles
Gold medal – first place	1977 Ta' Qali	Mixed team
Silver medal – second place	1975 Copenhagen	Mixed team
Bronze medal – third place	1975 Copenhagen	Girls' doubles

Karen Chapman (née Puttick; born 21 May 1959) is an English retired badminton player.

== Career ==
She won the bronze medal at the 1983 IBF World Championships in mixed doubles with Mike Tredgett.

She represented England and won two gold medals in the team event and mixed doubles and a bronze medal in the women's doubles, at the 1982 Commonwealth Games in Brisbane, Queensland, Australia.

== Achievements ==
=== World Championships ===
Mixed doubles
Year	Venue	Partner	Opponent	Score	Result
1983	Brøndbyhallen, Copenhagen, Denmark	(England) Mike Tredgett	(Sweden) Thomas Kihlström (England) Nora Perry	10–15, 15–9, 6–15	Bronze

=== World Cup ===
Mixed doubles
Year	Venue	Partner	Opponent	Score	Result
1983	Stadium Negara, Kuala Lumpur, Malaysia	(Sweden) Thomas Kihlström	(Indonesia) Christian Hadinata (Indonesia) Ivana Lie	15–12, 10–15, 4–15	Bronze

=== Commonwealth Games ===
Women's doubles
Year	Venue	Partner	Opponent	Score	Result
1982	Chandler Sports Hall, Brisbane, Australia	(England) Sally Podger	(India) Ami Ghia (India) Kanwal Thakur Singh	11–15, 15–6, 15–8	Bronze

Mixed doubles
Year	Venue	Partner	Opponent	Score	Result
1982	Chandler Sports Hall, Brisbane, Australia	(England) Martin Dew	(England) Duncan Bridge (England) Karen Beckman	18–13, 15–3	Gold

=== European Championships ===
Women's doubles
Year	Venue	Partner	Opponent	Score	Result
1984	Guild Hall, Preston, England	(England) Gillian Clark	(England) Karen Beckman (England) Gillian Gilks	15–17, 15–12, 15–2	Gold

Mixed doubles
Year	Venue	Partner	Opponent	Score	Result
1980	Martinihal, Groningen, Netherlands	(England) Derek Talbot	(Sweden) Lars Wengberg (Sweden) Anette Börjesson	15–9, 9–15, 12–15	Bronze
1984	Guild Hall, Preston, England	(England) Mike Tredgett	(Sweden) Thomas Kihlström (Sweden) Maria Bengtsson	8–15, 12–15	Bronze

=== European Junior Championships ===
Girls' doubles
Year	Venue	Partner	Opponent	Score	Result
1975	Gladsaxe Sportscenter, Copenhagen, Denmark	(England) Andrea Tuckett	(Denmark) Lilli B. Pedersen (Denmark) Liselotte Gøttsche	14–18, 12–15	Bronze
1977	RAF Ta Kali, Ta'Qali, Malta	(England) Karen Bridge	(Scotland) Pamela Hamilton (Scotland) Joy Reid	17–15, 15–8	Gold

Mixed doubles
Year	Venue	Partner	Opponent	Score	Result
1975	Gladsaxe Sportscenter, Copenhagen, Denmark	(England) Tim Stokes	(England) Duncan Bridge (England) Lorraine Fowler	18–15, 15–10	Gold
1977	RAF Ta Kali, Ta'Qali, Malta	(England) Nigel Tier	(England) Kevin Jolly (England) Karen Bridge	Walkover	Gold

=== IBF World Grand Prix ===
The World Badminton Grand Prix was sanctioned by International Badminton Federation (IBF) from 1983-2006.

Women's doubles
Year	Tournament	Partner	Opponent	Score	Result
1983	Scottish Open	(England) Sally Podger	(England) Karen Beckman (England) Barbara Sutton	12–15, 6–15	(silver) Runner-up
1983	Dutch Open	(England) Sally Podger	(England) Gillian Clark (England) Gillian Gilks	8–15, 16–17	(silver) Runner-up
1983	German Open	(England) Helen Troke	(Japan) Shigemi Kawamura (Japan) Sumiko Kitada	10–15, 4–15	(silver) Runner-up
1984	German Open	(England) Gillian Clark	(England) Karen Beckman (England) Gillian Gilks	14–17, 14–18	(silver) Runner-up
1984	Canada Open	(England) Gillian Gowers	(China) Chen Hong (China) Luo Yun	15–5, 15–9	(gold) Winner
1989	Scottish Open	(England) Sara Sankey	(England) Gillian Clark (England) Gillian Gowers	10–15, 6–15	(silver) Runner-up
1994	Brunei Open	(England) Joanne Muggeridge	(China) Peng Xingyong (China) Zhang Jin	11–15, 16–12, 5–15	(silver) Runner-up

Mixed doubles
Year	Tournament	Partner	Opponent	Score	Result
1983	English Masters	(England) Mike Tredgett	(England) Martin Dew (England) Gillian Gilks	5–15, 8–15	(silver) Runner-up
1983	Scandinavian Cup	(England) Mike Tredgett	(England) Martin Dew (England) Gillian Gilks	13–15, 12–15	(silver) Runner-up
1984	German Open	(England) Mike Tredgett	(England) Martin Dew (England) Gillian Gilks	5–15, 15–12, 11–15	(silver) Runner-up
1984	Canadian Open	(Scotland) Billy Gilliland	(England) Nigel Tier (England) Gillian Gowers	3–15, 8–15	(silver) Runner-up
1987	English Masters	(England) Richard Outterside	(Denmark) Jesper Knudsen (Denmark) Nettie Nielsen	18–14, 9–15, 9–15	(silver) Runner-up

=== IBF International ===
Women's doubles
Year	Tournament	Partner	Opponent	Score	Result
1983	Welsh International	(England) Helen Troke	(England) Gillian Gilks (England) Paula Kilvington	15–8, 11–15, 15–9	(gold) Winner
1984	Welsh International	(England) Karen Beckman	(England) Gillian Gilks (England) Helen Troke	14–17, 8–15	(silver) Runner-up
1984	Scottish Open	(England) Jane Webster	(England) Karen Beckman (Scotland) Pamela Hamilton	14–18, 18–13, 15–6	(gold) Winner
1989	Bell's Open	(England) Sara Sankey	(Scotland) Elinor Middlemiss (Scotland) Jennifer Williamson	18–15, 0–15, 15–4	(gold) Winner
1989	Welsh International	(England) Sara Sankey	(Soviet Union) Elena Rybkina (Soviet Union) Vlada Tcherniavskaia	15–12, 7–15, 15–2	(gold) Winner

Mixed doubles
Year	Tournament	Partner	Opponent	Score	Result
1983	Welsh International	(England) Mike Tredgett	(England) Martin Dew (England) Gillian Gilks	8–15, 15–9, 18–15	(gold) Winner
1984	Welsh International	(Scotland) Billy Gilliland	(England) Martin Dew (England) Gillian Gilks	10–15, 15–7, 9–15	(silver) Runner-up
1984	Scottish Open	(Scotland) Billy Gilliland	(England) Dipak Tailor (England) Karen Beckman	15–3, 15–6	(gold) Winner
1989	Bell's Open	(England) Andy Goode	(England) Miles Johnson (England) Cheryl Johnson	15–5, 15–8	(gold) Winner
1991	Welsh International	(England) Chris Hunt	(England) Andy Goode (England) Joanne Goode	17–18, 4–15	(silver) Runner-up
1994	Mauritius International	(England) Dave Wright	(Mauritius) Michael Adams (England) Joanne Davies	11–15, 9–15	(silver) Runner-up
1994	Irish Open	(England) Ian Pearson	(Scotland) Kenny Middlemiss (Scotland) Elinor Middlemiss	11–15, 15–10, 9–15	(silver) Runner-up
1995	Mauritius International	(England) Steve Isaac	(Switzerland) Jorge Rodriguez (England) Rebecca Pantaney	17–15, 12–15, 15–9	(gold) Winner

=== International tournaments ===
Women's doubles
Year	Tournament	Partner	Opponent	Score	Result
1977	Canadian Open	(England) Nora Perry	(England) Barbara Sutton (England) Jane Webster	15–8, 15–9	(gold) Winner
1979	Scottish Open	(England) Jane Webster	(England) Karen Bridge (England) Paula Kilvington	18–14, 15–6	(gold) Winner
1979	Welsh International	(England) Jane Webster	(England) Barbara Sutton (Netherlands) Joke van Beusekom	17–14, 9–15, 11–15	(gold) Winner
1980	Scottish Open	(England) Kathleen Redhead	(England) Karen Bridge (England) Paula Kilvington	10–15, 5–15	(silver) Runner-up
1980	German Open	(England) Jane Webster	(England) Gillian Clark (England) Sally Podger	15–9, 15–5	(gold) Winner
1981	German Open	(England) Sally Podger	(England) Gillian Gilks (England) Paula Kilvington	8–15, 7–15	(silver) Runner-up
1981	Welsh International	(England) Sally Podger	(Netherlands) Marjan Ridder (Netherlands) Karin Duijvestijn	15–10, 15–2	(gold) Winner
1982	India Open	(England) Jane Webster	(England) Gillian Clark (England) Gillian Gilks	1–15, 3–15	(silver) Runner-up
1982	Welsh International	(England) Sally Podger	(England) Nora Perry (England) Jane Webster	8–15, 14–17	(silver) Runner-up

Mixed doubles
Year	Tournament	Partner	Opponent	Score	Result
1979	Welsh International	(Scotland) Billy Gilliland	(England) David Eddy (England) Barbara Sutton	15–7, 15–10	(gold) Winner
1980	Scottish Open	(England) Mike Tredgett	(Scotland) Billy Gilliland (Scotland) Joanna Flockhart	15–2, 15–2	(gold) Winner
1980	Welsh International	(Scotland) Billy Gilliland	(England) Mike Tredgett (England) Nora Perry	15–10, 11–15, 10–15	(silver) Runner-up
1980	English Masters	(Scotland) Billy Gilliland	(Indonesia) Christian Hadinata (Indonesia) Imelda Wiguna	6–15, 6–15	(silver) Runner-up
1981	Welsh International	(Scotland) Billy Gilliland	(England) Eddy Sutton (England) Karen Bridge	10–15, 15–9, 15–11	(gold) Winner
1981	India Open	(Scotland) Billy Gilliland	(England) Ray Stevens (England) Nora Perry	12–15, 3–15	(silver) Runner-up
1982	All England Open	(Scotland) Billy Gilliland	(England) Martin Dew (England) Gillian Gilks	10–15, 17–14, 7–15	(silver) Runner-up
1982	India Open	(Scotland) Billy Gilliland	(Sweden) Thomas Kihlström (England) Jane Webster	18–14, 15–11	(gold) Winner
1982	Indonesia Open	(Scotland) Billy Gilliland	(England) Martin Dew (England) Gillian Gilks	15–5, 8–15, 10–15	(silver) Runner-up
1982	Canadian Open	(Scotland) Billy Gilliland	(Canada) Paul Johnson (Canada) Claire Backhouse	10–15, 15–6, 15–8	(gold) Winner
