= 1984 European Badminton Championships =

Tournament details
- Dates: 8–14 April
- Edition: 9
- Venue: Guild Hall
- Location: Preston, England

The 9th European Badminton Championships were held in Preston, England, between 8 and 14 April 1984, and hosted by the European Badminton Union and Badminton England.

== Venue ==
The championships were held at the Guild Hall.

== Medalists ==
Event	Gold	Silver	Bronze
Men's singles	(Denmark) Morten Frost	(Denmark) Jens Peter Nierhoff	(England) Steve Baddeley
Men's singles	(Denmark) Morten Frost	(Denmark) Jens Peter Nierhoff	(Sweden) Göran Carlsson
Women's singles	(England) Helen Troke	(England) Sally Podger	(England) Karen Beckman
Women's singles	(England) Helen Troke	(England) Sally Podger	(Denmark) Kirsten Larsen
Men's doubles	(England) Martin Dew and Mike Tredgett	(Denmark) Morten Frost and Jens Peter Nierhoff	(Scotland) Billy Gilliland and Dan Travers
Men's doubles	(England) Martin Dew and Mike Tredgett	(Denmark) Morten Frost and Jens Peter Nierhoff	(Sweden) Lars Wengberg and Ulf Johansson
Women's doubles	(England) Gillian Clark and Karen Chapman	(England) Gillian Gilks and Karen Beckman	(Denmark) Dorte Kjær and Kirsten Larsen
Women's doubles	(England) Gillian Clark and Karen Chapman	(England) Gillian Gilks and Karen Beckman	(Sweden) Maria Bengtsson and Christine Magnusson
Mixed doubles	(England) Martin Dew and Gillian Gilks	(Sweden) Thomas Kihlström and Maria Bengtsson	(England) Nigel Tier and Gillian Clark
Mixed doubles	(England) Martin Dew and Gillian Gilks	(Sweden) Thomas Kihlström and Maria Bengtsson	(England) Mike Tredgett and Karen Chapman
Teams	England	Denmark	Sweden

== Results ==
=== Semi-finals ===
Category	Winner	Runner-up	Score
Men's singles	(Denmark) Morten Frost	(England) Steve Baddeley	15–4, 15–4
Men's singles	(Denmark) Jens Peter Nierhoff	(Sweden) Göran Carlsson	15–6, 15–10
Women's singles	(England) Sally Podger	(Denmark) Kirsten Larsen	11–0, 6–11, 11–5
Women's singles	(England) Helen Troke	(England) Karen Beckman	11–8, 11–7
Men's doubles	(Denmark) Jens Peter Nierhoff (Denmark) Morten Frost	(Scotland) Billy Gilliland (Scotland) Dan Travers	15–13, 18–14
Men's doubles	(England) Martin Dew (England) Mike Tredgett	(Sweden) Lars Wengberg (Sweden) Ulf Johansson	15–12, 15–6
Women's doubles	(England) Gillian Gilks (England) Karen Beckman	(Denmark) Dorte Kjær (Denmark) Kirsten Larsen	15–11, 15–9
Women's doubles	(England) Gillian Clark (England) Karen Chapman	(Sweden) Christine Magnusson (Sweden) Maria Bengtsson	Walkover
Mixed doubles	(Sweden) Thomas Kihlström (Sweden) Maria Bengtsson	(England) Mike Tredgett (England) Karen Chapman	15–8, 15–12
Mixed doubles	(England) Martin Dew (England) Gillian Gilks	(England) Nigel Tier (England) Gillian Clark	15–11, 15–8

=== Finals ===
Category	Winners	Runners-up	Score
Men's singles	(Denmark) Morten Frost	(Denmark) Jens Peter Nierhoff	15–8, 15–2
Women's singles	(England) Helen Troke	(England) Sally Podger	11–5, 11–2
Men's doubles	(England) Martin Dew (England) Mike Tredgett	(Denmark) Jens Peter Nierhoff (Denmark) Morten Frost	15–8, 15–10
Women's doubles	(England) Gillian Clark (England) Karen Chapman	(England) Gillian Gilks (England) Karen Beckman	15–17, 15–12, 15–2
Mixed doubles	(England) Martin Dew (England) Gillian Gilks	(Sweden) Thomas Kihlström (Sweden) Maria Bengtsson	15–5, 17–15

== Medal account ==
* Host nation (England)

Rank	Nation	Gold	Silver	Bronze	Total
1	England*	5	2	4	11
2	Denmark	1	3	2	6
3	Sweden	0	1	4	5
4	Scotland	0	0	1	1
Totals (4 entries)		6	6	11	23
