= Martin Dew =

English badminton player

Personal information
- Born: 16 August 1958 (age 68)

Sport
- Country: England
- Sport: Badminton
Medal record
Men's badminton
Representing England
World Championships
Silver medal – second place	1983 Copenhagen	Men's doubles
Bronze medal – third place	1987 Beijing	Mixed doubles
World Cup
Gold medal – first place	1983 Kuala Lumpur	Mixed doubles
Bronze medal – third place	1984 Jakarta	Mixed doubles
Bronze medal – third place	1985 Jakarta	Mixed doubles
Thomas Cup
Bronze medal – third place	1982 London	Men's team
Bronze medal – third place	1984 Kuala Lumpur	Men's team
Commonwealth Games
Gold medal – first place	1982 Brisbane	Mixed doubles
Gold medal – first place	1982 Brisbane	Mixed team
Silver medal – second place	1982 Brisbane	Men's doubles
European Championships
Gold medal – first place	1984 Preston	Men's doubles
Gold medal – first place	1982 Böblingen	Mixed doubles
Gold medal – first place	1984 Preston	Mixed doubles
Gold medal – first place	1986 Uppsala	Mixed doubles
Silver medal – second place	1982 Böblingen	Men's doubles
European Mixed Team Championships
Gold medal – first place	1982 Böblingen	Mixed team
Gold medal – first place	1984 Preston	Mixed team
Silver medal – second place	1986 Uppsala	Mixed team

Martin Dew (born 16 August 1958) is a former English male badminton player who specialized in doubles.

== Career ==
Dew won two medals in the World Championships, a silver medal in 1983 for men's doubles and a bronze medal in 1987 for mixed doubles. He shared the mixed doubles title at the All-England Championships twice with Gillian Gilks (1982 and 1984). Dew is also one of the most successful players ever in the European Badminton Championships with four titles, one of them in men's doubles and three in mixed doubles.

He is one of the very few elite players to have completed a Ph.D during his playing career. He gained a Ph.D in 1984 from Hatfield University in the subject of Numerical Optimisation in cooperation with Rolls Royce aeroengines.

== Achievements ==
=== World Championships ===
Men's doubles
Year	Venue	Partner	Opponent	Score	Result
1983	Brøndbyhallen, Copenhagen, Denmark	(England) Mike Tredgett	(Denmark) Steen Fladberg (Denmark) Jesper Helledie	10–15, 10–15	Silver

Mixed doubles
Year	Venue	Partner	Opponent	Score	Result
1987	Capital Indoor Stadium, Beijing, China	(England) Gillian Gilks	(China) Wang Pengren (China) Shi Fangjing	7–15, 8–15	Bronze

=== World Cup ===
Mixed doubles
Year	Venue	Partner	Opponent	Score	Result
1983	Stadium Negara, Kuala Lumpur, Malaysia	(England) Gillian Gilks	(Indonesia) Christian Hadinata (Indonesia) Ivana Lie	15–8, 9–15, 15–8	Gold
1984	Istora Senayan, Jakarta, Indonesia	(England) Gillian Gilks	(Indonesia) Christian Hadinata (Indonesia) Ivana Lie	15–4, 3–15, 10–15	Bronze
1985	Istora Senayan, Jakarta, Indonesia	(England) Gillian Gilks	(Denmark) Steen Fladberg (England) Nora Perry	8–15, 7–15	Bronze

=== Commonwealth Games ===
Men's doubles
Year	Venue	Partner	Opponent	Score	Result
1982	Chandler Sports Hall, Brisbane, Australia	(England) Nick Yates	(Malaysia) Ong Beng Teong (Malaysia) Razif Sidek	10–15, 15–17	Silver

Mixed doubles
Year	Venue	Partner	Opponent	Score	Result
1982	Chandler Sports Hall, Brisbane, Australia	(England) Karen Chapman	(England) Duncan Bridge (England) Karen Beckman	18–13, 15–3	Gold

=== European Championships ===
Men's doubles
Year	Venue	Partner	Opponent	Score	Result
1982	Sporthalle, Böblingen, West Germany	(England) Mike Tredgett	(Sweden) Stefan Karlsson (Sweden) Thomas Kihlström	9–15, 3–15	Silver
1984	Preston Guild Hall, Preston, Lancashire, England	(England) Mike Tredgett	(Denmark) Morten Frost (Denmark) Jens Peter Nierhoff	15–8, 15–10	Gold

Mixed doubles
Year	Venue	Partner	Opponent	Score	Result
1982	Sporthalle, Böblingen, West Germany	(England) Gillian Gilks	(England) Mike Tredgett (England) Nora Perry	15–12, 15–5	Gold
1984	Guild Hall, Preston, England	(England) Gillian Gilks	(Sweden) Thomas Kihlström (Sweden) Maria Bengtsson	15–5, 17–15	Gold
1986	Fyrishallen, Uppsala, Sweden	(England) Gillian Gilks	(England) Nigel Tier (England) Gillian Gowers	15–6, 15–8	Gold

=== IBF World Grand Prix (26 titles, 19 runners-up) ===
The World Badminton Grand Prix sanctioned by International Badminton Federation (IBF) from 1983 to 2006.

Men's doubles
Year	Tournament	Partner	Opponent	Score	Result
1983	Dutch Open	(England) Mike Tredgett	(Denmark) Steen Fladberg (Denmark) Jesper Helledie	13–18, 10–15	(silver) Runner-up
1983	German Open	(England) Mike Tredgett	(Malaysia) Jalani Sidek (Malaysia) Razif Sidek	8–15, 15–12, 15–8	(gold) Winner
1983	All England Open	(England) Mike Tredgett	(Sweden) Thomas Kihlström (Sweden) Stefan Karlsson	10–15, 13–15	(silver) Runner-up
1983	Scandinavian Cup	(England) Mike Tredgett	(Indonesia) Rudy Heryanto (Indonesia) Hariamanto Kartono	15–12, 16–18, 11–15	(silver) Runner-up
1983	India Open	(England) Steve Baddeley	(Denmark) Jens Peter Nierhoff (Denmark) Jesper Helledie	15–7, 6–15, 14–15	(silver) Runner-up
1984	Japan Open	(England) Steve Baddeley	(Sweden) Thomas Kihlström (Sweden) Stefan Karlsson	6–15, 6–15	(silver) Runner-up
1984	German Open	(England) Mike Tredgett	(England) Duncan Bridge (England) Nigel Tier	15–9, 7–15, 18–17	(gold) Winner
1984	All England Open	(England) Mike Tredgett	(Indonesia) Rudy Heryanto (Indonesia) Hariamanto Kartono	11–15, 6–15	(silver) Runner-up
1985	Malaysia Open	(England) Dipak Tailor	(Malaysia) Jalani Sidek (Malaysia) Razif Sidek	16–18, 15–12, 3–15	(silver) Runner-up
1985	Scandinavian Cup	(England) Dipak Tailor	(Denmark) Steen Fladberg (Denmark) Jesper Helledie	12–15, 9–15	(silver) Runner-up
1986	Scandinavian Cup	(England) Dipak Tailor	(Denmark) Steen Fladberg (Denmark) Jesper Helledie	9–15, 18–15, 7–15	(silver) Runner-up
1986	Carlton-Intersport-Cup	(England) Dipak Tailor	(Denmark) Steen Fladberg (Denmark) Jesper Helledie	15–9, 18–14	(gold) Winner
1986	Denmark Open	(England) Dipak Tailor	(China) Li Yongbo (China) Tian Bingyi	9–15, 3–15	(silver) Runner-up
1986	English Masters	(England) Dipak Tailor	(China) Li Yongbo (China) Tian Bingyi	15–11, 5–15, 11–15	(silver) Runner-up
1987	Poona Open	(England) Dipak Tailor	(Denmark) Peter Buch (Denmark) Nils Skeby	15–3, 17–15	(gold) Winner
1987	German Open	(England) Dipak Tailor	(Thailand) Sawei Chanseorasmee (Thailand) Sakrapee Thongsari	12–15, 10–15	(silver) Runner-up

Mixed doubles
Year	Tournament	Partner	Opponent	Score	Result
1983	Japan Open	(England) Jane Webster	(Sweden) Thomas Kihlström (England) Nora Perry	5–15, 2–15	(silver) Runner-up
1983	Scandinavian Cup	(England) Gillian Gilks	(England) Mike Tredgett (England) Karen Chapman	15–13, 15–12	(gold) Winner
1983	Dutch Open	(England) Gillian Gilks	(Denmark) Steen Skovgaard (Denmark) Anne Skovgaard	15–10, 17–16	(gold) Winner
1983	Malaysia Open	(England) Nora Perry	(Indonesia) Christian Hadinata (Indonesia) Ivana Lie	5–15, 15–10, 15–6	(gold) Winner
1983	Indonesia Open	(England) Gillian Gilks	(Indonesia) Christian Hadinata (Indonesia) Ivana Lie	17–18, 9–15	(silver) Runner-up
1983	Dutch Masters	(England) Gillian Gilks	(England) Mike Tredgett (England) Karen Chapman	15–4, 15–10	(gold) Winner
1983	English Masters	(England) Gillian Gilks	(England) Mike Tredgett (England) Karen Chapman	15–5, 15–8	(gold) Winner
1984	German Open	(England) Gillian Gilks	(England) Mike Tredgett (England) Karen Chapman	15–5, 12–15, 15–11	(gold) Winner
1984	All England Open	(England) Gillian Gilks	(England) Nigel Tier (England) Gillian Gowers	15–8, 15–3	(gold) Winner
1984	Scandinavian Cup	(England) Gillian Gilks	(England) Dipak Tailor (England) Gillian Gowers	17–14, 15–3	(gold) Winner
1984	Dutch Open	(England) Gillian Gilks	(Scotland) Billy Gilliland (England) Gillian Gowers	17–14, 13–15, 15–6	(gold) Winner
1984	Indonesia Open	(England) Gillian Gilks	(Indonesia) Christian Hadinata (Indonesia) Ivana Lie	12–15, 7–15	(silver) Runner-up
1984	Malaysia Open	(England) Gillian Clark	(England) Nigel Tier (England) Gillian Gowers	15–6, 15–5	(gold) Winner
1984	Dutch Masters	(England) Gillian Gilks	(China) Jiang Guoliang (China) Lin Ying	15–10, 14–17, 15–10	(gold) Winner
1984	English Masters	(England) Gillian Gilks	(Scotland) Billy Gilliland (England) Gillian Gowers	18–15, 15–7	(gold) Winner
1984	Japan Open	(England) Gillian Gilks	(Sweden) Thomas Kihlström (Sweden) Maria Bengtsson	5–15, 15–3, 18–16	(gold) Winner
1985	German Open	(England) Gillian Gilks	(England) Nigel Tier (England) Gillian Gowers	12–15, 15–4, 15–13	(gold) Winner
1985	Indonesia Open	(England) Gillian Gilks	(England) Nigel Tier (England) Gillian Gowers	15–12, 15–0	(gold) Winner
1985	Japan Open	(England) Gillian Gilks	(Scotland) Billy Gilliland (England) Gillian Gowers	10–15, 15–18	(silver) Runner-up
1985	Chinese Taipei Open	(England) Gillian Gilks	(Scotland) Billy Gilliland (England) Gillian Gowers	15–8, 15–10	(gold) Winner
1985	Denmark Open	(England) Gillian Gilks	(England) Dipak Tailor (England) Nora Perry	8–15, 15–8, 10–15	(silver) Runner-up
1985	Hong Kong Open	(England) Gillian Gilks	(Scotland) Billy Gilliland (England) Gillian Gowers	15–10, 18–16	(gold) Winner
1986	German Open	(England) Gillian Gilks	(South Korea) Lee Deuk-choon (South Korea) Chung Myung-hee	15–10, 17–18, 10–15	(silver) Runner-up
1986	Carlton Intersport Cup	(England) Gillian Gilks	(England) Nigel Tier (England) Gillian Gowers	15–12, 15–4	(gold) Winner
1986	Scandinavian Cup	(England) Gillian Gilks	(South Korea) Lee Deuk-choon (South Korea) Chung Myung-hee	17–16, 12–15, 15–7	(gold) Winner
1986	Denmark Open	(England) Gillian Gilks	(Denmark) Jesper Knudsen (Denmark) Nettie Nielsen	15–10, 15–11	(gold) Winner
1987	German Open	(England) Gillian Gilks	(England) Dipak Tailor (England) Gillian Clark	15–12, 15–7	(gold) Winner
1987	Poona Open	(England) Gillian Gilks	(England) Andy Goode (England) Fiona Elliott	18–14, 18–14	(gold) Winner
1988	German Open	(England) Gillian Gilks	(Denmark) Steen Fladberg (England) Gillian Clark	15–9, 14–18, 4–15	(silver) Runner-up

=== International tournaments (7 titles, 6 runners-up) ===
Men's doubles
Year	Tournament	Partner	Opponent	Score	Result
1981	English Masters	(England) Mike Tredgett	(Sweden) Stefan Karlsson (Sweden) Thomas Kihlström	15–9, 2–15, 15–10	(gold) Winner
1981	German Open	(England) Duncan Bridge	(Malaysia) Jalani Sidek (Malaysia) Razif Sidek	15–6, 11–15, 15–9	(gold) Winner
1982	Chinese Taipei Open	(England) Mike Tredgett	(Indonesia) Bobby Ertanto (Indonesia) Hadibowo Susanto	15–6, 11–15, 15–11	(gold) Winner
1982	Japan Open	(England) Mike Tredgett	(Indonesia) Rudy Heryanto (Indonesia) Hariamanto Kartono	15–9, 7–15, 14–18	(silver) Runner-up
1982	Dutch Open	(England) Mike Tredgett	(Scotland) Billy Gilliland (Scotland) Dan Travers	11–15, 15–5, 17–15	(gold) Winner

Mixed doubles
Year	Tournament	Partner	Opponent	Score	Result
1981	Swedish Open	(England) Gillian Clark	(Scotland) Billy Gilliland (England) Nora Perry	4–15, 18–14	(silver) Runner-up
1981	Bell’s Open	(England) Gillian Gilks	(Scotland) Billy Gilliland (England) Nora Perry	16–17, 10–15	(silver) Runner-up
1982	Japan Open	(England) Jane Webster	(England) Mike Tredgett (England) Nora Perry	10–15, 2–15	(silver) Runner-up
1982	All England Open	(England) Gillian Gilks	(Scotland) Billy Gilliland (England) Karen Chapman	15–10, 14–17, 15–7	(gold) Winner
1982	Indonesia Open	(England) Gillian Gilks	(Scotland) Billy Gilliland (England) Karen Chapman	5–15, 15–8, 15–10	(gold) Winner
1982	Dutch Open	(England) Gillian Gilks	(Denmark) Steen Skovgaard (Denmark) Dorte Kjær	17–14, 14–17, 15–8	(gold) Winner
1982	Denmark Open	(England) Gillian Gilks	(Sweden) Thomas Kihlström (England) Nora Perry	11–15, 9–15	(silver) Runner-up
1982	Victor Cup	(England) Gillian Gilks	(Sweden) Thomas Kihlström (England) Nora Perry	15–9, 9–15, 9–15	(silver) Runner-up
