= 1975 European Junior Badminton Championships =

Badminton championships

Tournament details
- Dates: 17–20 April 1975
- Edition: 4th
- Venue: Gladsaxe Sportscenter
- Location: Copenhagen, Denmark

The 1975 European Junior Badminton Championships was the fourth edition of the European Junior Badminton Championships. It was held in Gladsaxe Sportscenter, Copenhagen, Denmark, in the month of April. Danish players won three titles, the girls' singles, girls' doubles and mixed team championships while England won the mixed doubles, and sweden won the boys' singles and boys' doubles disciplines.

== Medalists ==
Discipline	Gold	Silver	Bronze
Boys' singles	(Sweden) Bruno Wackfelt	(Denmark) Morten Frost	(Sweden) Lars Kotte
Boys' singles	(Sweden) Bruno Wackfelt	(Denmark) Morten Frost	(England) Kevin Jolly
Girls' singles	(Denmark) Pia Nielsen	(England) Paula Kilvington	(Sweden) Anita Steiner
Girls' singles	(Denmark) Pia Nielsen	(England) Paula Kilvington	(Denmark) Inge Borgstrøm
Boys' doubles	(Sweden) Bruno Wackfelt (Sweden) Göran Sterner	(England) Kevin Jolly (England) Tim Stokes	(Sweden) Häkan Fossto (Sweden) Lars Kotte
Boys' doubles	(Sweden) Bruno Wackfelt (Sweden) Göran Sterner	(England) Kevin Jolly (England) Tim Stokes	(England) Gary Scott (England) Duncan Bridge
Girls' doubles	(Denmark) Liselotte Gøttsche (Denmark) Lilli B. Pedersen	(Denmark) Pia Nielsen (Denmark) Inge Borgstrøm	(England) Karen Puttick (England) Andrea Tuckett
Girls' doubles	(Denmark) Liselotte Gøttsche (Denmark) Lilli B. Pedersen	(Denmark) Pia Nielsen (Denmark) Inge Borgstrøm	(England) Paula Kilvington (England) Karen Bridge
Mixed doubles	(England) Tim Stokes (England) Karen Puttick	(England) Duncan Bridge (England) Lorraine Fowler	(Sweden) Bruno Wackfelt (Sweden) Anita Steiner
Mixed doubles	(England) Tim Stokes (England) Karen Puttick	(England) Duncan Bridge (England) Lorraine Fowler	(Northern Ireland) Trevor Woods (Northern Ireland) Linda Andrews
Mixed team	Denmark; Morten Frost; Inge Borgstrøm; Bo Elvers; Kenn H. Nielsen; Pia Nielsen; Bjørn Madsen; Liselotte Gøttsche; Jytte Larsen	England; Kevin Jolly; Paula Kilvington; Tim Stokes; Karen Puttick; Andrea Tuckett	Sweden; Anita Steiner; Ingrid Broberg; Bruno Wackfelt; Häkan Fossto; Lars Kotte; Göran Sterner

== Results ==
=== Semi-finals ===
Category	Winner	Runner-up	Score
Boys' singles	(Denmark) Morten Frost	(Sweden) Lars Kotte	15–6, 15–10
Boys' singles	(Sweden) Bruno Wackfelt	(England) Kevin Jolly	15–12, 18–16
Girls' singles	(Denmark) Pia Nielsen	(Sweden) Anita Steiner	12–11, 11–2
Girls' singles	(England) Paula Kilvington	(Denmark) Inge Borgstrøm	11–6, 12–10
Boys' doubles	(England) Kevin Jolly (England) Tim Stokes	(Sweden) Häkan Fossto (Sweden) Lars Kotte	8–15, 15–13, 15–11
Boys' doubles	(Sweden) Bruno Wackfelt (Sweden) Göran Sterner	(England) Duncan Bridge (England) Gary Scott	15–11, 15–5
Girls' doubles	(Denmark) Lilli B. Pedersen (Denmark) Liselotte Gøttsche	(England) Andrea Tuckett (England) Karen Puttick	18–14, 15–12
Girls' doubles	(Denmark) Inge Borgstrøm (Denmark) Pia Nielsen	(England) Karen Bridge (England) Paula Kilvington	7–15, 15–5, 15–5
Mixed doubles	(England) Tim Stokes (England) Karen Puttick	(Sweden) Bruno Wackfelt (Sweden) Anita Steiner	15–3, 15–4
Mixed doubles	(England) Duncan Bridge (England) Lorraine Fowler	(Republic of Ireland) Trevor Woods (Republic of Ireland) Linda Andrews	17–16, 15–5

=== Finals ===
Category	Winners	Runners-up	Score
Boys' singles	(Sweden) Bruno Wackfelt	(Denmark) Morten Frost	18–15, 15–2
Girls' singles	(Denmark) Pia Nielsen	(England) Paula Kilvington	11–2, 11–3
Boys' doubles	(Sweden) Bruno Wackfelt (Sweden) Göran Sterner	(England) Kevin Jolly (England) Tim Stokes	15–5, 15–12
Girls' doubles	(Denmark) Lilli B. Pedersen (Denmark) Liselotte Gøttsche	(Denmark) Inge Borgstrøm (Denmark) Pia Nielsen	15–10, 15–13
Mixed doubles	(England) Tim Stokes (England) Karen Puttick	(England) Duncan Bridge (England) Lorraine Fowler	18–15, 15–10

== Medal table ==
Rank	Nation	Gold	Silver	Bronze	Total
1	Denmark (DEN)	3	2	2	7
2	Sweden (SWE)	2	0	5	7
3	England (ENG)	1	4	4	9
4	Ireland (IRE)	0	0	1	1
Totals (4 entries)		6	6	12	24
