= Badminton at the 1982 Commonwealth Games =

- Venue: Chandler Sports Hall
- Location: Brisbane, Australia
- Dates: 30 September – 9 October

The badminton competition at the 1982 Commonwealth Games took place in the Chandler Sports Hall, Brisbane, Australia, from 30 September until 9 October 1982.

== Medal table ==
* Host nation (Australia)

Rank	Nation	Gold	Silver	Bronze	Total
1	England	3	5	2	10
2	Canada	1	1	1	3
3	Malaysia	1	0	1	2
4	India	1	0	0	1
5	Australia	0	0	1	1
5	New Zealand	0	0	1	1
Totals (6 entries)		6	6	6	18

== Medallists ==
Category	Gold	Silver	Bronze
Men's singles	(India) Syed Modi	(England) Nick Yates	(Malaysia) Razif Sidek
Women's singles	(England) Helen Troke	(England) Sally Podger	(England) Gillian Clark
Men's doubles	(Malaysia) Ong Beng Teong & Razif Sidek	(England) Martin Dew & Nick Yates	(Canada) Pat Tryon & Paul Johnson
Women's doubles	(Canada) Claire Backhouse & Johanne Falardeau	(England) Gillian Clark & Karen Beckman	(England) Karen Chapman & Sally Podger
Mixed doubles	(England) Martin Dew & Karen Chapman	(England) Duncan Bridge & Karen Beckman	(New Zealand) Steve Wilson & Robin Denton
Mixed team	England	Canada	Australia

== Finals ==
Category	Winner	Runner-up	Score
Men's singles	(India) Syed Modi	(England) Nick Yates	7-15, 15–6, 15–5
Women's singles	(England) Helen Troke	(England) Sally Podger	4-11, 11–3, 11–5
Men's doubles	(Malaysia) Ong Beng Teong & Razif Sidek	(England) Martin Dew & Nick Yates	15-10, 17-15
Women's doubles	(Canada) Claire Backhouse & Johanne Falardeau	(England) Gillian Clark & Karen Beckman	13-15, 18–16, 15–4
Mixed doubles	(England) Martin Dew & Karen Chapman	(England) Duncan Bridge & Karen Beckman	18-13, 15-3
Mixed team	England	Canada	5-0

== Results ==
=== Men's singles ===
Round of 16
1	(India) Syed Modi	15	15
16	(Hong Kong) Tin Cheung Chan	5	1
8	(Canada) Bob MacDougall	w/o
9	(Nigeria) Babatunde Badiru	scr
5	(Canada) Keith Priestman	15	18
12	(Australia) Michael Scandolera	11	14
4	(India) Pradeep Gandhe	15	4	15
13	(Scotland) Gordon Hamilton	11	15	11
6	(England) Nick Yates	w/o
11	(Canada) Mark Freitag	scr
3	(New Zealand) Chris Bullen	15	15
14	(Wales) Philip Sutton	12	7
7	(Malaysia) Razif Sidek	15	15
10	(England) Dipak Tailor	9	2
2	(Hong Kong) Sze Yu	15	15
15	(Scotland) Alex White	2	6

Quarter-finals
(India) Modi	15	15
(Canada) MacDougall	4	8
(Canada) Priestman	15	15
(India) Gandhe	8	9
(England) Yates	15	15
(New Zealand) Bullen	3	6
(Malaysia) Sidek	8	15	15
(Hong Kong) Sze	15	9	9

Semi-finals
(India) Modi	15	15
(Canada) Priestman	7	9
(England) Yates	18	15
(Malaysia) Sidek	16	8

Final
(India) Modi	7	15	15
(England) Yates	15	6	5
Third place
(Malaysia) Sidek	15	15
(Canada) Priestman	8	2

=== Women's singles ===
Round of 16
1	(England) Helen Troke	11	11
16	(Australia) Julie McDonald	6	3
8	(Northern Ireland) Diane Underwood	5	11	11
9	(Canada) Denyse Julien	11	9	5
5	(England) Karen Beckman	5	11	11
12	(New Zealand) Toni Whittaker	11	9	5
4	(India) Amita Kulkarni	0	11	11
13	(Canada) Jane Youngberg	11	4	5
6	(England) Sally Podger	11	11
11	(Northern Ireland) Ann Crossan	0	0
3	(Canada) Johanne Falardeau	11	11
14	(Australia) Jane Forrest	5	1
7	(England) Gillian Clark	11	11
10	(Hong Kong) Wong Har Ping	9	6
2	(India) Ami Ghia	12	11
15	(New Zealand) Allison Sinton	10	8

Quarter-finals
(England) Troke	11	11
(Northern Ireland) Underwood	3	2
(England) Beckman	8	11	11
(India) Kulkrani	11	8	2
(England) Podger	11	11	11
(Canada) Falardeau	12	4	7
(England) Clark	11	6	11
(India) Ghia	5	11	3

Semi-finals
(England) Troke	11	8	11
(England) Beckman	4	11	2
(England) Podger	7	12	12
(England) Clark	11	11	10

Final
(England) Troke	4	11	11
(England) Podger	11	3	5
Third place
(England) Clark	w/o
(England) Beckman	scr

=== Men's doubles ===
Quarterfinals
(Malaysia) Ong Beng Teong (Malaysia) Razif Sidek	15	15
(Wales) Philip Sutton (Wales) Mark Richards	3	3
(England) Duncan Bridge (England) Dipak Tailor	15	17
(Canada) Bob MacDougall (Canada) Mark Freitag	13	15
(England) Martin Dew (England) Nick Yates	15	15
(Hong Kong) Sze Yu (Hong Kong) Wong Man Hing	3	1
(Canada) Pat Tryon (Canada) Paul Johnson	15	15
(India) Leroy D'Sa (India) Pradeep Gandhe	3	13

Semifinals
(Malaysia) Ong (Malaysia) Sidek	15	15
(England) Bridge (England) Tailor	11	10
(England) Dew (England) Yates	15	14	15
(Canada) Tryon (Canada) Johnson	12	17	7

Finals
(Malaysia) Ong (Malaysia) Sidek	15	17
(England) Dew (England) Yates	10	15
Third place
(Canada) Tryon (Canada) Johnson	15	15	15
(England) Bridge (England) Tailor	11	18	5

=== Women's doubles ===
Quarterfinals
(Canada) Claire Backhouse (Canada) Johanne Falardeau	15	7	15
(Scotland) Alison Fulton (Scotland) Pamela Hamilton	12	15	4
(England) Karen Chapman (England) Sally Podger	15	15
(New Zealand) Robin Denton (New Zealand) Toni Whittaker	11	3
(England) Gillian Clark (England) Karen Beckman	7	15	15
(Canada) Denyse Julien (Canada) Sandra Skillings	15	12	7
(India) Ami Ghia (India) Kanwal Thakur Singh	15	15
(Hong Kong) Wong Har Ping (Hong Kong) Amy Chan	8	2

Semifinals
(Canada) Backhouse (Canada) Falardeau	11	15	15
(England) Chapman (England) Podger	15	6	6
(England) Clark (England) Beckman	18	15
(India) Ghia (India) Singh	17	12

Finals
(Canada) Backhouse (Canada) Falardeau	13	18	15
(England) Clark (England) Beckman	15	16	4
Third place
(England) Chapman (England) Podger	11	15	15
(India) Ghia (India) Singh	15	6	8

=== Mixed doubles ===
Quarterfinals
(England) Martin Dew (England) Karen Chapman	15	15
(Scotland) Alex White (Scotland) Christine Heatly	5	2
(New Zealand) Steve Wilson (New Zealand) Robin Denton	15	15
(Canada) Paul Johnson (Canada) Claire Backhouse	11	3
(England) Duncan Bridge (England) Karen Beckman	17	17
(Australia) Michael Scandolera (Australia) Audrey Swaby	15	14
(Australia) Trevor James (Australia) Jennifer Cunningham	13	15	15
(Hong Kong) Wong Har Ping (Hong Kong) Amy Chan	15	11	6

Semifinals
(England) Dew (England) Chapman	15	15
(New Zealand) Wilson (New Zealand) Denton	11	10
(England) Bridge (England) Beckman	15	15
(Australia) James (Australia) Cunningham	8	13

Finals
(England) Dew (England) Chapman	18	15
(England) Bridge (England) Beckman	13	3
Third place
(New Zealand) Wilson (New Zealand) Denton	15	15
(Australia) James (Australia) Cunningham	5	1

=== Mixed team ===
==== Semifinals ====
Team One	Team Two	Score
England	New Zealand	5-0
Canada	Australia	4-1

==== Bronze medal play-off ====
Team One	Team Two	Score
Australia	New Zealand	3-2

==== Final ====
England
5

Canada
0

			1	2	3
1	(England) (Canada)	Helen Troke; Jane Youngberg	11; 2	11; 6
2	(England) (Canada)	Nick Yates; Keith Priestman	15; 12	15; 4
3	(England) (Canada)	Gillian Clark / Karen Beckman; Claire Backhouse / Johanne Falardeau	15; 5	9; 15	15; 8
4	(England) (Canada)	Martin Dew / Steve Baddeley; Bob MacDougall / Mark Freitag	15; 5	15; 6
5	(England) (Canada)	Martin Dew / Karen Chapman; Paul Johnson / Claire Backhouse	15; 7	15; 0
