= Paula Kilvington =

English badminton player

Personal information
- Born: 1957 (age 68–69) Hull

Sport
- Country: England
- Sport: Badminton
Medal record
Women's badminton
Representing England
European Junior Championships
Silver medal – second place	1975 Copenhagen	Girls' singles
Bronze medal – third place	1975 Copenhagen	Girls' doubles

Paula Kilvington (born 1957) is a former English badminton international player and a former national champion.

== Biography ==
Kilvington became an English National doubles champion after winning the English National Badminton Championships women's doubles title with Gillian Gilks in 1984. She had previously finished runner-up in the doubles in 1982 and was an English junior champion in 1975. She represented Yorkshire and also won the 1979 Hungarian International.

== Achievements ==
=== European Junior Championships ===
Girls' singles

Year	Venue	Opponent	Score	Result
1975	Gladsaxe Sportscenter, Copenhagen, Denmark	(Denmark) Pia Nielsen	2–11, 3–11	Silver

Girls' doubles

Year	Venue	Partner	Opponent	Score	Result
1975	Gladsaxe Sportscenter, Copenhagen, Denmark	(England) Karen Bridge	(Denmark) Inge Borgstrom (Denmark) Pia Nielsen	15–7, 5–15, 5–15	Bronze

=== International tournaments (10 titles, 10 runners-up) ===
Women's singles

Year	Tournament	Opponent	Score	Result
1976	Welsh International	(England) Anne Statt	11–8, 11–9	(gold) Winner
1979	Hungarian International	(Netherlands) Hanke de Kort	11–6, 11–7	(gold) Winner
1979	Welsh International	(England) Jane Webster	6–11, 4–11	(silver) Runner-up
1979	Scottish Open	(England) Jane Webster	10–12, 3–11	(silver) Runner-up
1979	Irish Open	(England) Sally Podger	Walkover	(silver) Runner-up
1980	Scottish Open	(Scotland) Pamela Hamilton	12–9, 11–8	(gold) Winner
1981	Scottish Open	(England) Gillian Gilks	1–11, 3–11	(silver) Runner-up

Women's doubles

Year	Tournament	Partner	Opponent	Score	Result
1978	Scottish Open	(England) Anne Statt	(England) Jane Webster (England) Sue Whittaker	15–17, 15–5, 9–15	(silver) Runner-up
1978	Dutch Open	(England) Gillian Gilks	(England) Nora Perry (England) Anne Statt	9–15, 7–15	(silver) Runner-up
1979	Hungarian International	(England) Diane Simpson	(East Germany) Monika Cassens (East Germany) Angela Michalowski	7–15, 17–18	(silver) Runner-up
1979	Scottish Open	(England) Karen Bridge	(England) Karen Chapman (England) Jane Webster	2–15, 5–15	(silver) Runner-up
1980	Welsh International	(England) Gillian Gilks	(England) Nora Perry (England) Jane Webster	14–17, 15–9, 15–11	(gold) Winner
1980	Scottish Open	(England) Karen Bridge	(England) Karen Chapman (England) Kathleen Redhead	15–10, 15–5	(gold) Winner
1980	Bell's Open	(England) Gillian Gilks	(England) Nora Perry (England) Jane Webster	15–8, 15–6	(gold) Winner
1981	Copenhagen Cup	(England) Gillian Gilks	(England) Nora Perry (England) Jane Webster	15–12, 15–8	(gold) Winner
1981	Dutch Open	(England) Gillian Gilks	(England) Nora Perry (England) Jane Webster	15–7, 15–8	(gold) Winner
1981	German Open	(England) Gillian Gilks	(England) Karen Chapman (England) Sally Podger	15–8, 15–7	(gold) Winner
1981	All England Open	(England) Gillian Gilks	(England) Nora Perry (England) Jane Webster	8–15, 4–15	(silver) Runner-up
1981	Scottish Open	(England) Gillian Gilks	(Northern Ireland) Barbara Beckett (England) Kathleen Redhead	15–13, 15–7	(gold) Winner
1983	Welsh International	(England) Gillian Gilks	(England) Karen Chapman (England) Helen Troke	8–15, 15–11, 9–15	(silver) Runner-up
