= Karen Bridge =

English badminton player (1960–2020)

Personal information
- Nickname: Duchess
- Born: 27 March 1960 Surrey, England
- Died: 19 June 2020 (aged 60) Surrey, England

Sport
- Country: England
- Sport: Badminton
Medal record
Women's badminton
Representing England
World Championships
Bronze medal – third place	1980 Jakarta	Women's doubles
Uber Cup
Silver medal – second place	1984 Kuala Lumpur	Women's team
Commonwealth Games
Gold medal – first place	1978 Edmonton	Mixed team
Gold medal – first place	1982 Brisbane	Mixed team
Silver medal – second place	1982 Brisbane	Women's doubles
Silver medal – second place	1982 Brisbane	Mixed doubles
European Championships
Gold medal – first place	1982 Böblingen	Mixed team
Gold medal – first place	1984 Preston	Mixed team
Silver medal – second place	1982 Böblingen	Women's singles
Silver medal – second place	1984 Preston	Women's doubles
Silver medal – second place	1986 Uppsala	Mixed team
Bronze medal – third place	1984 Preston	Women's singles
Bronze medal – third place	1986 Uppsala	Women's doubles
European Junior Championships
Gold medal – first place	1977 Ta' Qali	Girls' singles
Gold medal – first place	1977 Ta' Qali	Girls' doubles
Gold medal – first place	1977 Ta' Qali	Mixed team
Silver medal – second place	1977 Ta' Qali	Mixed doubles
Silver medal – second place	1975 Copenhagen	Mixed team
Bronze medal – third place	1975 Copenhagen	Girls' doubles

Karen Beckman née Bridge (March 1960 – June 2020) was a female badminton player of England.

== Career ==
She won a bronze medals at the 1980 IBF World Championships in women's doubles with Barbara Sutton.

She represented England and won a gold medal in the team event, at the 1978 Commonwealth Games in Edmonton, Alberta, Canada. In addition she reached the quarter-finals of the doubles and mixed doubles.

Four years later, as Karen Beckman she represented England and won a gold medal in the team event and two silver medals in the women's doubles and mixed doubles, at the 1982 Commonwealth Games in Brisbane, Queensland, Australia. The mixed doubles medal was with her brother, Duncan Bridge.

== Personal life ==
She was a coach for the Wilson Boys' School's badminton team and a part-time coach for the Wimbledon Racquets and Fitness Club's junior badminton team towards the end of her life.

She has a son, Ben Beckman, who has also successfully played badminton for England.

Beckman died of cancer in June 2020.

== Achievements ==
=== World Championships ===
Women's doubles
Year	Venue	Partner	Opponent	Score	Result
1980	Istora Senayan, Jakarta, Indonesia	(England) Barbara Sutton	(Indonesia) Verawaty Fadjrin (Indonesia) Imelda Wiguna	15–12, 10–15, 4–15	Bronze

=== Commonwealth Games ===
Women's doubles
Year	Venue	Partner	Opponent	Score	Result
1982	Chandler Sports Hall, Brisbane, Australia	(England) Gillian Clark	(Canada) Claire Backhouse-Sharpe (Canada) Johanne Falardeau	15–13, 16–18, 4–15	Silver

Mixed doubles
Year	Venue	Partner	Opponent	Score	Result
1982	Chandler Sports Hall, Brisbane, Australia	(England) Duncan Bridge	(England) Martin Dew (England) Karen Chapman	13–18, 3–15	Silver

=== European Championships ===
Women's singles
Year	Venue	Opponent	Score	Result
1982	Sporthalle, Böblingen, West Germany	(Denmark) Lene Køppen	1–11, 9–11	Silver
1984	Guild Hall, Preston, England	(England) Helen Troke	8–11, 7–11	Bronze

Women's doubles
Year	Venue	Partner	Opponent	Score	Result
1984	Guild Hall, Preston, England	(England) Gillian Gilks	(England) Karen Chapman (England) Gillian Clark	17–15, 12–15, 2–15	Silver
1986	Fyrishallen, Uppsala, Sweden	(England) Sara Halsall	(Denmark) Dorte Kjær (Denmark) Nettie Nielsen	8–15, 4–15	Bronze

=== European Junior Championships ===
Girls' singles
Year	Venue	Opponent	Score	Result
1977	RAF Ta Kali hangar, Ta'Qali, Malta	(Denmark) Kirsten Meier	11–8, 11–3	Gold

Girls' doubles
Year	Venue	Partner	Opponent	Score	Result
1975	Gladsaxe Sportscenter, Copenhagen, Denmark	(England) Paula Kilvington	(Denmark) Inge Borgstrom (Denmark) Pia Nielsen	15–7, 5–15, 5–15	Bronze
1977	RAF Ta Kali hangar, Ta'Qali, Malta	(England) Karen Puttick	(Scotland) Pamela Hamilton (Scotland) Joy Reid	17–15, 15–8	Gold

Mixed doubles
Year	Venue	Partner	Opponent	Score	Result
1977	RAF Ta Kali hangar, Ta'Qali, Malta	(England) Kevin Jolly	(England) Nigel Tier (England) Karen Puttick	walkover	Silver

=== IBF Grand Prix ===
The World Badminton Grand Prix was sanctioned by the International Badminton Federation (IBF) from 1983-2006.

Women's singles
Year	Tournament	Opponent	Score	Result
1984	German Open	(England) Helen Troke	9–12, 12–10, 11–6	(gold) Winner

Women's doubles
Year	Tournament	Partner	Opponent	Score	Result
1983	Canadian Open	(England) Sally Podger	(Canada) Claire Backhouse-Sharpe (Canada) Johanne Falardeau	18–14, 10–15, 15–4	(gold) Winner
1984	Dutch Open	(England) Gillian Gilks	(Denmark) Dorte Kjær (Denmark) Kirsten Larsen	15–12, 15–10	(gold) Winner
1984	German Open	(England) Gillian Gilks	(England) Karen Chapman (England) Gillian Clark	17–14, 18–14	(gold) Winner
1984	Japan Open	(England) Gillian Gilks	(Indonesia) Ruth Damayanti (Indonesia) Maria Fransisca	13–15, 15–3, 15–12	(gold) Winner
1984	Thailand Open	(England) Gillian Gilks	(England) Gillian Gowers (England) Helen Troke	18–16, 17–18, 15–9	(gold) Winner
1984	Chinese Taipei Open	(England) Gillian Gilks	(Indonesia) Ruth Damayanti (Indonesia) Maria Fransisca	15–12, 9–15, 17–14	(gold) Winner
1985	German Open	(England) Gillian Gilks	(China) Guan Weizhen (China) Wu Jianqiu	9–15, 15–6, 9–15	(silver) Runner-up
1985	Chinese Taipei Open	(England) Gillian Gilks	(England) Gillian Clark (England) Nora Perry	15–10, 14–17, 0–15	(silver) Runner-up
1985	English Masters	(England) Sara Sankey	(England) Gillian Clark (England) Gillian Gowers	15–11, 15–5	(gold) Winner

=== IBF International ===
Women's singles
Year	Tournament	Opponent	Score	Result
1977	Portugal International			(gold) Winner
1981	Victor Cup	(England) Jane Webster	11–1, 4–11, 11–4	(silver) Runner-up
1983	Welsh International	(England) Fiona Elliott	11–3, 11–3	(gold) Winner
1983	Bell's Open	(Scotland) Pamela Hamilton	11–5, 12–9	(gold) Winner
1985	Bell's Open	(England) Fiona Elliott	11–5, 11–4	(gold) Winner

Women's doubles
Year	Tournament	Partner	Opponent	Score	Result
1977	Portugal International	(England) Anne Statt			(gold) Winner
1980	Scottish Open	(England) Paula Kilvington	(England) Kathleen Redhead (England) Karen Chapman	15–10, 15–5	(gold) Winner
1981	Victor Cup	(England) Barbara Sutton	(England) Jane Webster (England) Nora Perry	12–15, 15–11, 6–15	(silver) Runner-up
1983	Scottish Open	(England) Barbara Sutton	(England) Karen Chapman (England) Sally Podger	15–12, 15–6	(gold) Winner
1983	Bell's Open	(England) Barbara Sutton	(Northern Ireland) Barbara Beckett (Scotland) Alison Fulton	15–12, 15–9	(gold) Winner
1984	Scottish Open	(Scotland) Pamela Hamilton	(England) Karen Chapman (England) Jane Webster	18–14, 13–18, 6–15	(silver) Runner-up
1984	Bell's Open	(England) Sally Podger	(England) Gillian Gowers (England) Helen Troke	6–15, 15–3, 14–18	(silver) Runner-up
1985	Welsh International	(England) Sara Sankey	(Denmark) Hanne Adsbøl (Denmark) Nettie Nielsen	15–7, 15–12	(gold) Winner
1985	Bell's Open	(England) Sara Sankey	(England) Lisa Chapman (England) Fiona Elliot	15–9, 15–6	(gold) Winner
1986	Welsh International	(England) Sara Sankey	(England) Lisa Chapman (England) Cheryl Cooke	15–10, 15–12	(gold) Winner
1986	Bell's Open	(England) Sara Sankey	(England) Fiona Elliot (England) Helen Troke	15–0, 15–9	(gold) Winner
1987	Irish Open	(England) Sara Sankey	(Scotland) Elinor Allen (Scotland) Jennifer Allen	15–6, 15–4	(gold) Winner
1988	Bell's Open	(England) Sara Sankey	(Canada) Denyse Julien (Canada) Claire Backhouse-Sharpe	12–15, 10–15	(silver) Runner-up

Mixed doubles
Year	Tournament	Partner	Opponent	Score	Result
1977	Portugal International	(England) Tim Stokes			(gold) Winner
1983	Holland Masters	(England) Mike Tredgett	(England) Martin Dew (England) Gillian Gilks	4–15, 10–15	(silver) Runner-up
1983	Bell's Open	(England) Duncan Bridge	(England) Eddy Sutton (Scotland) Alison Fulton	15–8, 15–12	(gold) Winner
1984	Scottish Open	(England) Dipak Tailor	(Scotland) Billy Gilliland (England) Karen Chapman	3–15, 6–15	(silver) Runner-up
1984	Bell's Open	(Scotland) Billy Gilliland	(England) Nigel Tier (England) Gillian Gowers	17–16, 15–13	(gold) Winner
1986	Welsh International	(England) Chris Dobson	(England) Martin Dew (England) Gillian Gilks	1–15, 0–15	(silver) Runner-up
1987	Irish Open	(England) Mike Tredgett	(Scotland) Billy Gilliland (Scotland) Jennifer Allen	15–7, 8–15, 15–11	(gold) Winner
1989	Bell's Open	(England) Andy Goode	(England) Miles Johnson (England) Cheryl Johnson	15–5, 15–8	(gold) Winner
