= Helen Troke =

English badminton player

Personal information
- Full name: Helen Suzanne Troke
- Born: 7 November 1964 (age 62) Southampton, England
- Height: 172 cm (5 ft 8 in)

Sport
- Country: England
- Sport: Badminton
Medal record
Women's badminton
Representing England
World Championships
Bronze medal – third place	1983 Copenhagen	Women's singles
Uber Cup
Silver medal – second place	1984 Kuala Lumpur	Women's team
Commonwealth Games
Gold medal – first place	1982 Brisbane	Women's singles
Gold medal – first place	1982 Brisbane	team event
Gold medal – first place	1986 Edinburgh	Women's singles
Gold medal – first place	1986 Edinburgh	team event
Gold medal – first place	1990 Auckland	team event
Bronze medal – third place	1986 Edinburgh	Women's doubles
Bronze medal – third place	1990 Auckland	Women's singles
European Championships
Gold medal – first place	1982 Böblingen	Mixed team
Gold medal – first place	1984 Preston	Mixed team
Gold medal – first place	1984 Preston	Women's singles
Gold medal – first place	1986 Uppsala	Women's singles
Silver medal – second place	1986 Uppsala	Mixed team
Bronze medal – third place	1988 Kristiansand	Mixed team
Bronze medal – third place	1990 Moscow	Mixed team
Bronze medal – third place	1990 Moscow	Women's singles
European Junior Championships
Gold medal – first place	1981 Edinburgh	Women's singles
Gold medal – first place	1983 Helsinki	Women's singles
Gold medal – first place	1983 Helsinki	Mixed team
Silver medal – second place	1981 Edinburgh	Mixed team

Helen Suzanne Troke (born 7 November 1964) is an English retired badminton player.

== Career ==
She won the bronze medal at the 1983 IBF World Championships in women's singles. From 1982 to 1986 she won two singles and three team titles at the European championships.

She represented England and won double gold in the team event, at the 1982 Commonwealth Games in Brisbane, Queensland, Australia.

== Achievements ==
=== World Championships ===
Women's singles
Year	Venue	Opponent	Score	Result
1983	Brøndbyhallen, Copenhagen, Denmark	(China) Li Lingwei	10–12, 6–11	Bronze

=== Commonwealth Games ===
Women's singles
Year	Venue	Opponent	Score	Result
1982	Edmonton, Brisbane, Australia	(England) Sally Podger	4–11, 11–3, 11–5	Gold
1986	Meadowbank Sports Centre, Edinburgh, Scotland	(England) Fiona Elliott	11–4, 11–4	Gold
1990	Auckland Badminton Hall; Auckland, New Zealand	(India) Deepti Thanekar	11–0, 11–0	Bronze

Women's doubles
Year	Venue	Partner	Opponent	Score	Result
1986	Meadowbank Sports Centre, Edinburgh, Scotland	(England) Fiona Elliott	(Canada) Claire Backhouse-Sharpe (Canada) Linda Cloutier	15–8, 15–11	Bronze

=== European Championships ===
Women's singles
Year	Venue	Opponent	Score	Result
1984	Guild Hall, Preston, England	(England) Sally Podger	11–5, 11–2	Gold
1986	Uppsala, Sweden	(Denmark) Kirsten Larsen	9–12, 11–3, 11–2	Gold
1990	Minor Arena of the Central Lenin Stadium; Moscow, Soviet Union	(Denmark) Pernille Nedergaard	2–11, 6–11	Bronze

=== European Junior Championships ===
Girls' singles
Year	Venue	Opponent	Score	Result
1981	Meadowbank Sports Centre; Edinburgh, Scotland	(Denmark) Nettie Nielsen	8–11, 12–9, 11–6	Gold
1983	Helsinki; Finland	(Sweden) Christine Magnusson	11–5, 12–10	Gold

=== IBF World Grand Prix ===
The World Badminton Grand Prix sanctioned by International Badminton Federation (IBF) from 1983 to 2006.

Women's singles
Year	Tournament	Opponent	Score	Result
1983	Swedish Open	(England) Jane Webster	11–2, 11–5	(gold) Winner
1984	German Open	(England) Karen Beckman	12–9, 10–12, 6–11	(silver) Runner-up
1984	Thailand Open	(Denmark) Kirsten Larsen	11–5, 11–8	(gold) Winner
1984	Dutch Open	(Denmark) Kirsten Larsen	4–11, 11–7, 12–10	(gold) Winner
1984	Chinese Taipei Open	(Indonesia) Ivana Lie	11–12, 9–11	(silver) Runner-up
1984	Denmark Open	(China) Zheng Yuli	6–11, 7–11	(silver) Runner-up
1985	India Open	(Denmark) Kirsten Larsen	11–8, 11–8	(gold) Winner
1985	Malaysia Open	(England) Gillian Gowers	Walkover	(silver) Runner-up
1985	Chinese Taipei Open	(Denmark) Kirsten Larsen	11–5, 11–2	(gold) Winner
1986	German Open	(South Korea) Kim Yun-ja	1–11, 11–8, 10–12	(silver) Runner-up
1986	Indonesia Open	(China) Shi Wen	11–6, 9–11, 9–11	(silver) Runner-up
1986	Dutch Open	(China) Xiao Jie	6–11, 11–3, 6–11	(silver) Runner-up
1986	Chinese Taipei Open	(Denmark) Kirsten Larsen	12–11, 6–11, 4–11	(silver) Runner-up
1987	Chinese Taipei Open	(Denmark) Kirsten Larsen	4–11, 11–5, 1–11	(silver) Runner-up
1988	Poona Open	(Sweden) Christine Magnusson	12–11, 4–11, 4–11	(silver) Runner-up
1989	German Open	(Denmark) Pernille Nedergaard	4–11, 11–8, 11–7	(gold) Winner
1990	Scottish Open	(Netherlands) Eline Coene	11–3, 11–0	(gold) Winner
1991	Finnish Open	(China) Tang Jiuhong	7–11, 8–11	(silver) Runner-up

Women's doubles
Year	Tournament	Partner	Opponent	Score	Result
1984	Thailand Open	(England) Gillian Gowers	(England) Gillian Gilks (England) Karen Beckman	16–18, 18–17, 9–15	(silver) Runner-up
1986	Dutch Open	(England) Gillian Gowers	(Netherlands) Eline Coene (Netherlands) Erica van Dijck	18–15, 15–9	(gold) Winner
1987	Scottish Open	(England) Gillian Gowers	(England) Fiona Elliott (England) Sara Halsall	11–15, 15–3, 15–12	(gold) Winner

=== Open tournaments ===
Women's singles
Year	Tournament	Opponent	Score	Result
1981	Irish Open	(Republic of Ireland) Diane Underwood	11–2, 12–11	(gold) Winner
1982	Scottish Open	(Denmark) Lene Køppen	8–11, 4–11	(silver) Runner-up

Women's doubles
Year	Tournament	Partner	Opponent	Score	Result
1982	Scottish Open	(England) Barbara Sutton	(England) Gillian Clark (England) Gillian Gilks	3–15, 8–15	(silver) Runner-up

=== IBF International ===
Women's singles
Year	Tournament	Opponent	Score	Result
1980	Hungarian International	(England) Diane Simpson	11–4, 11–0	(gold) Winner
1983	English Masters	(China) Chen Ruizhen	9–12, 12–11, 1–11	(silver) Runner-up
1984	English Masters	(Denmark) Kirsten Larsen	1–11, 10–12	(silver) Runner-up
1987	Bell's Open	(England) Fiona Elliott	4–11, 10–12	(silver) Runner-up
1992	Amor International	(Russia) Elena Rybkina	11–7, 2–11, 4–11	(silver) Runner-up

Women's doubles
Year	Tournament	Partner	Opponent	Score	Result
1980	Hungarian International	(England) Diane Simpson	(East Germany) Angela Michalowski (East Germany) Monika Cassens	7–15, 0–15	(silver) Runner-up
1983	German Open	(England) Karen Chapman	(Japan) Shigemi Kawamura (Japan) Sumiko Kitada	10–15, 4–15	(silver) Runner-up
1983	Dutch Masters	(England) Gillian Gilks	(Indonesia) Ivana Lie (Indonesia) Rosiana Tendean	15–11, 8–15, 12–15	(silver) Runner-up
1983	Welsh International	(England) Karen Chapman	(England) Gillian Gilks (England) Paula Kilvington	15–8, 11–15, 15–9	(gold) Winner
1984	Welsh International	(England) Gillian Gilks	(England) Karen Beckman (England) Karen Chapman	17–14, 15–8	(gold) Winner
1984	Bell's Open	(England) Gillian Gowers	(England) Karen Chapman (England) Sally Podger	15–6, 3–15, 18–14	(gold) Winner
1986	Bell's Open	(England) Fiona Elliott	(England) Karen Beckman (England) Sara Halsall	0–15, 9–15	(silver) Runner-up

Mixed doubles
Year	Tournament	Partner	Opponent	Score	Result
1986	Bell's Open	(Scotland) Billy Gilliland	(England) Andy Goode (England) Fiona Elliott	15–4, 11–15, 15–17	(silver) Runner-up
