= Johanne Falardeau =

Canadian badminton player

Personal information
- Born: 1959 (age 66–67)

Sport
- Country: Canada
- Sport: Badminton
- Handedness: Right
- Retired: 1991
- Event: Doubles

Doubles
- BWF profile
Medal record
Women's badminton
Representing Canada
Commonwealth Games
Gold medal – first place	1982 Brisbane	Women's doubles
Silver medal – second place	1986 Edinburgh	Women's doubles
Silver medal – second place	1978 Edmonton	Mixed team
Silver medal – second place	1982 Brisbane	Mixed team
Silver medal – second place	1986 Edinburgh	Mixed team
Silver medal – second place	1990 Auckland	Mixed team
Bronze medal – third place	1990 Auckland	Women's doubles
Pan American Championships
Gold medal – first place	1978 Lima	Women's singles
Gold medal – first place	1979 Mexico City	Women's singles
Gold medal – first place	1980 San Diego	Women's singles
Gold medal – first place	1978 Lima	Women's doubles
Gold medal – first place	1979 Mexico City	Women's doubles
Gold medal – first place	1980 San Diego	Women's doubles
Gold medal – first place	1978 Lima	Mixed team
Gold medal – first place	1979 Mexico City	Mixed team
Silver medal – second place	1978 Lima	Mixed doubles
Silver medal – second place	1979 Mexico City	Mixed doubles

Johanne Falardeau (born 1959) is a Canadian retired badminton player. Falardeau is the first ever women's doubles player from her country to win a gold medal at the Commonwealth Games. Additionally, she won a silver and bronze in the same discipline, too. She is also a 6-time former Pan American champion and became the national champion for seven times between 1982 and 1990.

Introduced to badminton at the age of ten by Jean-Claude Laprise, Falardeau has experienced a meteoric progression. She became provincial junior champion in the under-nineteen category three years later and made it to the national team at the age of fifteen. The following year, she won the triple crown (singles, doubles, mixed) at the Canadian Junior Championships. Her first international success came at the 1978 Commonwealth Games where she won silver medal in mixed team event. 1979, she became Pan American champion in both singles and mixed team events. Reaching finals multiple times in international tournaments, she became champion in French Open, U. S. Open, Canada Open and Victor Cup and had some second best performances in Bells Open, Scottish Open and Carlton Cup as well.

== Achievements ==
=== Commonwealth Games ===
Women's doubles
Year	Venue	Partner	Opponent	Score	Result
1982	Edmonton; Brisbane, Australia	(Canada) Claire Backhouse-Sharpe	(England) Gillian Clark (England) Karen Beckman	13–15, 18–16, 15–4	Gold
1986	Meadowbank Sports Centre; Edinburgh, Scotland	(Canada) Denyse Julien	(England) Gillian Clark (England) Gillian Gowers	6–15, 7–15	Silver
1990	Auckland Badminton Hall; Auckland, New Zealand	(Canada) Denyse Julien	(Malaysia) Tan Sui Hoon (Malaysia) Lim Siew Choon	18–13, 15–2	Bronze

=== IBF World Grand Prix ===
The World Badminton Grand Prix sanctioned by International Badminton Federation (IBF) from 1983 to 2006.

Women's doubles
Year	Tournament	Partner	Opponent	Score	Result
1983	Canada Open	(Canada) Claire Backhouse-Sharpe	(England) Karen Beckman (England) Sally Podger	14–18, 15–10, 4–15	(silver) Runner-up
1984	Scottish Open	(Canada) Claire Backhouse-Sharpe	(Scotland) Alison Fulton (Republic of Ireland) Barbara Beckett	12–15, 10–15	(silver) Runner-up
1987	Carlton-Intersport Open	(Canada) Denyse Julien	(England) Fiona Elliott (England) Sara Halsall	15–7, 6–15, 2–15	(silver) Runner-up

Mixed doubles
Year	Tournament	Partner	Opponent	Score	Result
1983	Canada Open	(Sweden) Lars Wengberg	(Canada) Mike Butler (Canada) Claire Backhouse-Sharpe	18–14, 10–15, 15–17	(silver) Runner-up

=== International tournaments ===
Women's doubles
Year	Tournament	Partner	Opponent	Score	Result
1982	French Open	(Canada) Linda Cloutier			(gold) Winner
1982	Canada Open	(Canada) Claire Backhouse-Sharpe	(England) Gillian Clark (England) Gillian Gilks	14–17, 6–15	(silver) Runner-up

Mixed doubles
Year	Tournament	Partner	Opponent	Score	Result
1980	Canada Open	(Denmark) Steen Fladberg	(England) Mike Tredgett (England) Nora Perry	7–15, 9–15	(silver) Runner-up
1982	French Open	(Canada) Bob MacDougall			(gold) Winner

=== IBF International ===
Women's doubles
Year	Tournament	Partner	Opponent	Score	Result
1983	U. S. Open	(Canada) Claire Backhouse-Sharpe			(gold) Winner
1983	Victor Cup	(Canada) Claire Backhouse-Sharpe	(England) Jane Sutton (England) Karen Beckman	9–15, 15–17	(silver) Runner-up
1984	Victor Cup	(Canada) Claire Backhouse-Sharpe	(Canada) Denyse Julien (Canada) Linda Cloutier	15–7, 15–4	(gold) Winner
1985	Canada Open	(Canada) Denyse Julien	(Canada) Claire Backhouse-Sharpe (Canada) Sandra Skilings	15–7, 14–17, 18–16	(gold) Winner
1986	U. S. Open	(Canada) Denyse Julien	(Japan) Yomiko Fushiki (Japan) Mami Nakajima	18–16, 15–5	(gold) Winner
1987	Bells Open	(Canada) Denyse Julien	(England) Fiona Elliott (England) Sara Halsall	9–15, 10–15	(silver) Runner-up

Mixed doubles
Year	Tournament	Partner	Opponent	Score	Result
1985	Canada Open	(Denmark) Jesper Helledie	(Scotland) Billy Gilliland (England) Nora Perry	6–15, 9–15	(silver) Runner-up
1986	U. S. Open	(Canada) Mike Butler	(United States) Peter Rawlek (United States) Susan Hill	15–5, 15–6	(gold) Winner
