= Steve Baddeley =

British badminton player

Personal information
- Born: 28 March 1961 (age 65) Brighton, East Sussex, England

Sport
- Country: England
- Sport: Badminton
Medal record
Men's badminton
Representing England
Thomas Cup
Bronze medal – third place	1982 London	Men's team
Bronze medal – third place	1984 Kuala Lumpur	Men's team
Commonwealth Games
Gold medal – first place	1982 Brisbane	Mixed team
Gold medal – first place	1986 Edinburgh	Men's singles
Gold medal – first place	1986 Edinburgh	Mixed team
European Championships
Gold medal – first place	1990 Moscow	Men's singles
Gold medal – first place	1984 Preston	Mixed team
Bronze medal – third place	1984 Preston	Men's singles
Bronze medal – third place	1990 Moscow	Mixed team
European Junior Championships
Silver medal – second place	1979 Mülheim an der Ruhr	Mixed team
Bronze medal – third place	1979 Mülheim an der Ruhr	Boys' singles

Stephen John Baddeley (born 1961) is an English retired badminton player who competed from the early 1980s to the early 1990s.

== Badminton career ==
Baddeley won the English men's singles title in 1982, 1985, and 1987. He is the only Englishman to win men's singles at the quadrennial British Commonwealth Games and one of only two to win the gold medal in men's singles at the biennial European Badminton Championships (1990).

He represented England and won a gold medal in the team event, at the 1982 Commonwealth Games in Brisbane, Queensland, Australia. In addition he participated in the singles.

Four years later he represented England and won double gold in singles and team event, at the 1986 Commonwealth Games in Edinburgh, Scotland.

== Achievements ==
=== European Championships ===
Men's singles
Year	Venue	Opponent	Score	Result
1984	Guild Hall, Preston, England	(Denmark) Morten Frost	4–15, 4–15	Bronze
1990	Luzhniki, Moscow, Soviet Union	(England) Darren Hall	11–15, 15–3, 15–7	Gold

=== Commonwealth Games ===
Men's singles
Year	Venue	Opponent	Score	Result
1986	Meadowbank Sports Centre, Edinburgh, Scotland	(Australia) Sze Yu	15–8, 15–8	Gold

=== IBF World Grand Prix ===
The World Badminton Grand Prix sanctioned by International Badminton Federation (IBF) from 1983 to 2006.

Men's singles
Year	Tournament	Opponent	Score	Result
1985	India Open	(South Korea) Park Joo-bong	18–17, 15–2	(gold) Winner
1985	English Masters	(Denmark) Morten Frost	12–15, 15–11, 11–15	(silver) Runner-up
1986	Scottish Open	(Denmark) Ib Frederiksen	15–18, 15–8, 2–15	(silver) Runner-up
1986	Dutch Open	(Denmark) Poul-Erik Høyer Larsen	15–4, 15–11	(gold) Winner
1987	English Masters	(Denmark) Morten Frost	13–15, 18–15, 12–15	(silver) Runner-up
1989	German Open	(Denmark) Morten Frost	6–15, 4–15	(silver) Runner-up

Men's doubles
Year	Tournament	Partner	Opponent	Score	Result
1984	Japan Open	(England) Martin Dew	(Sweden) Thomas Kihlström (Sweden) Stefan Karlsson	6–15, 6–15	(silver) Runner-up
1985	India Open	(England) Nick Yates	(South Korea) Park Joo-bong (South Korea) Kim Moon-soo	3–15, 5–15	(silver) Runner-up

Mixed doubles
Year	Tournament	Partner	Opponent	Score	Result
1986	Indonesia Open	(England) Gillian Gowers	(Denmark) Steen Fladberg (England) Gillian Clark	5–15, 4–15	(silver) Runner-up

== Management ==
In 2004 he took over as Director of Sport for Sport England. Steve Baddeley took over from Ged Roddy as Director of Sports for Team Bath at the University of Bath in February 2010.
