= Barbara Sutton =

English badminton player

Barbara Sutton (née Giles)
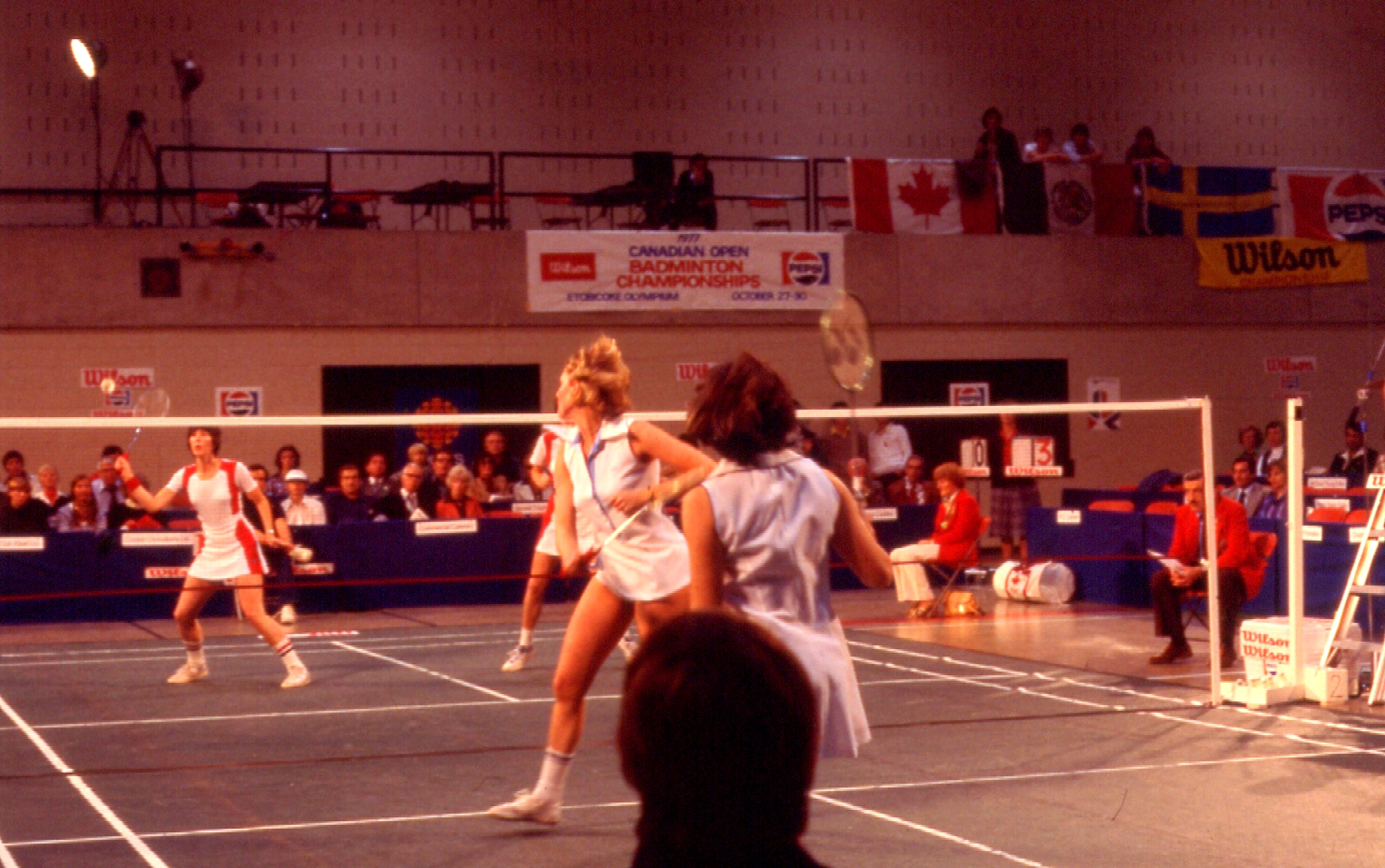

Personal information
- Born: 1953

Sport
- Country: England
- Sport: Badminton
Medal record
Women's badminton
Representing England
World Championships
Bronze medal – third place	1980 Jakarta	Women's doubles
Commonwealth Games
Gold medal – first place	1978 Edmonton	Mixed team
European Championships
Gold medal – first place	1974 Vienna	Mixed team
Gold medal – first place	1978 Preston	Mixed team
Silver medal – second place	1978 Preston	Women's doubles
Bronze medal – third place	1974 Vienna	Mixed doubles
European Junior Championships
Gold medal – first place	1971 Gottwaldov	Mixed doubles
Silver medal – second place	1971 Gottwaldov	Girls' doubles

Barbara Sutton née Barbara Giles is a retired female badminton player from England.

== Career ==
She won a bronze medal at the 1980 IBF World Championships in women's doubles with Karen Bridge.

She represented England and won a gold medal in the team event and a bronze medal in the mixed doubles, at the 1978 Commonwealth Games in Edmonton, Alberta, Canada.

She married fellow badminton player Eddy Sutton in 1977.

== Achievements ==
=== World Championships ===
Women's doubles
Year	Venue	Partner	Opponent	Score	Result
1980	Istora Senayan, Jakarta, Indonesia	(England) Karen Bridge	(Indonesia) Verawaty Fadjrin (Indonesia) Imelda Wiguna	15–12, 10–15, 4–15	Bronze

=== European Championships ===
Women's doubles
Year	Venue	Partner	Opponent	Score	Result
1978	Guild Hall, Preston. England	(England) Jane Webster	(England) Nora Perry (England) Anne Statt	7–15, 7–15	Silver

Mixed doubles
Year	Venue	Partner	Opponent	Score	Result
1974	Stadthalle, Vienna, Austria	(England) Mike Tredgett	(England) Derek Talbot (England) Gillian Gilks	0–15, 11–15	Bronze

=== European Junior Championships ===
Girls' doubles
Year	Venue	Partner	Opponent	Score	Result
1971	Zimní Stadion; Gottwaldov, Czechoslovakia	(England) Nora Gardner	(Denmark) Lene Køppen (Denmark) Anne Berglund	11–15, 7–15	Silver

Mixed doubles
Year	Venue	Partner	Opponent	Score	Result
1971	Zimní Stadion; Gottwaldov, Czechoslovakia	(England) Peter Gardner	(England) John Stretch (England) Nora Gardner	17–16, 18–14	Gold

=== IBF World Grand Prix (1 title, 1 runner-up) ===
The World Badminton Grand Prix was sanctioned by International Badminton Federation (IBF) from 1983-2006

Women's doubles
Year	Tournament	Partner	Opponent	Score	Result
1983	Scottish Open	(England) Karen Beckman	(England) Karen Chapman (England) Sally Podger	15–12, 15–6	(gold) Winner

Mixed doubles
Year	Tournament	Partner	Opponent	Score	Result
1983	Swedish Open	(England) Dipak Tailor	(Sweden) Thomas Kihlström (England) Nora Perry	7–15, 1–15	(silver) Runner-up

=== International tournaments (19 titles, 19 runners-up) ===
Women's singles
Year	Tournament	Opponent	Score	Result
1972	Portugal International	(England) Nora Perry	3–11, 9–11	(silver) Runner-up
1974	Portugal International	(Sweden) Karin Lindquist	11–1, 11–1	(gold) Winner

Women's doubles
Year	Tournament	Partner	Opponent	Score	Result
1972	Portugal International	(England) Nora Perry	(Portugal) Peggy Brixhe (Portugal) Isabel Rocha	15–5, 15–1	(gold) Winner
1973	Scottish Open	(England) Nora Perry	(South Africa) Deidre Tyghe (Northern Ireland) Barbara Beckett	15–12, 11–15, 18–17	(gold) Winner
1973	Portugal International	(England) Nora Perry	(England) Margaret Beck (Sweden) Eva Twedberg	16–17, 15–10, 15–9	(gold) Winner
1974	Swedish Open	(England) Heather Nielsen	(West Germany) Brigitte Steden (West Germany) Marieluise Zizmann	6–15, 15–13, 15–10	(gold) Winner
1974	Portugal International	(England) Margo Winter	(France) Viviane Beaugin (Portugal) Isabel Rocha	15–3, 15–3	(gold) Winner
1975	Swedish Open	(England) Susan Whetnall	(England) Gillian Gilks (England) Nora Perry	15–9, 4–15, 15–11	(gold) Winner
1975	South African Championships	(England) Susan Whetnall	(South Africa) Deidre Tyghe (South Africa) Barbara Lord	12–15, 15–7, 18–17	(gold) Winner
1976	German Open	(England) Jane Webster	(England) Gillian Gilks (England) Susan Whetnall	11–15, 9–15	(silver) Runner-up
1976	Welsh International	(England) Kathleen Whiting	(England) Anne Statt (England) Jane Webster	5–15, 10–15	(silver) Runner-up
1977	Swedish Open	(England) Gillian Gilks	(Netherlands) Marjan Ridder (Netherlands) Joke van Beusekom	15–5, 15–8	(gold) Winner
1977	German Open	(England) Jane Webster	(Denmark) Inge Borgstrøm (Denmark) Pia Nielsen	15–10, 15–11	(gold) Winner
1977	Dutch Open	(England) Jane Webster	(Netherlands) Marjan Ridder (Netherlands) Joke van Beusekom	15–12, 2–15, 12–15	(silver) Runner-up
1977	Denmark Open	(England) Jane Webster	(Netherlands) Marjan Ridder (Netherlands) Joke van Beusekom	15–9, 15–9	(gold) Winner
1977	Canadian Open	(England) Jane Webster	(England) Nora Perry (England) Karen Chapman	8–15, 9–15	(silver) Runner-up
1977	Welsh International	(Netherlands) Marjan Ridder	(England) Anne Statt (England) Jane Webster	15–9, 15–2	(gold) Winner
1978	German Open	(England) Jane Webster	(England) Nora Perry (England) Anne Statt	15–17, 5–15	(silver) Runner-up
1978	Czechoslovakian International	(England) Karen Chapman	(East Germany) Monika Cassens (East Germany) Angela Michalowski	15–8, 11–15, 13–15	(silver) Runner-up
1978	Welsh International	(England) Nora Perry	(Northern Ireland) Barbara Beckett (Netherlands) Marjan Ridder	15–2, 15–7	(gold) Winner
1979	Dutch Open	(England) Jane Webster	(England) Gillian Gilks (Netherlands) Marjan Ridder	12–15, 7–15	(silver) Runner-up
1979	Welsh International	(Netherlands) Joke van Beusekom	(England) Karen Chapman (England) Jane Webster	14–18, 6–15	(silver) Runner-up
1980	Swedish Open	(England) Karen Bridge	(Japan) Atsuko Tokuda (Japan) Yoshiko Yonekura	8–15, 6–15	(silver) Runner-up
1981	Victor Cup	(England) Karen Bridge	(England) Nora Perry (England) Jane Webster	12–15, 15–11, 6–15	(silver) Runner-up
1982	Scottish Open	(England) Helen Troke	(England) Gillian Gilks (England) Gillian Clark	3–15, 8–15	(silver) Runner-up
1983	Bell's Open	(England) Karen Bridge	(Northern Ireland) Barbara Beckett (Scotland) Alison Fulton	15–12, 15–9	(gold) Winner
1984	Irish Open	(England) Sally Podger	(Northern Ireland) Barbara Beckett (Scotland) Alison Fulton	15–10, 14–18, 17–14	(gold) Winner

Mixed doubles
Year	Tournament	Partner	Opponent	Score	Result
1972	Portugal International	(England) William Kidd	(England) Eddy Sutton (England) Nora Perry	15–4, 11–15, 15–10	(gold) Winner
1973	Portugal International	(England) Ray Stevens	(England) Elliot Stuart (England) Nora Perry	15–10, 14–15, 15–12	(gold) Winner
1974	Portugal International	(England) William Kidd	(England) David Hunt (England) Margo Winter	12–15, 3–15	(silver) Runner-up
1975	South African Championships	(England) Ray Stevens	(England) Paul Whetnall (England) Susan Whetnall	15–6, 10–15, 3–15	(silver) Runner-up
1976	Denmark Open	(England) David Eddy	(Denmark) Steen Skovgaard (Denmark) Lene Køppen	8–15, 4–15	(silver) Runner-up
1976	Welsh International	(England) David Eddy	(Netherlands) Rob Ridder (England) Pauline Davies	15–9, 12–15, 15–9	(gold) Winner
1977	Denmark Open	(England) David Eddy	(Denmark) Steen Skovgaard (Denmark) Lene Køppen	12–15, 8–15	(silver) Runner-up
1977	German Open	(England) David Eddy	(Netherlands) Rob Ridder (Netherlands) Marjan Ridder	15–11, 12–15, 15–10	(gold) Winner
1979	Welsh International	(England) David Eddy	(Scotland) Billy Gilliland (England) Karen Chapman	7–15, 10–15	(silver) Runner-up
1979	Dutch Open	(England) David Eddy	(England) Derek Talbot (England) Gillian Gilks	8–15, 11–15	(silver) Runner-up
1984	Irish Open	(England) Dipak Tailor	(Scotland) Billy Gilliland (Scotland) Christine Heatly	9–15, 15–6, 12–15	(silver) Runner-up
