= Duncan Bridge =

English badminton player (born 1958)

Personal information
- Born: 1958 (age 67–68) Wandsworth, Greater London, England

Sport
- Country: England
- Sport: Badminton
Medal record
Men's badminton
Representing England
Commonwealth Games
Gold medal – first place	1982 Brisbane	Mixed team
Silver medal – second place	1982 Brisbane	Mixed doubles
European Junior Championships
Silver medal – second place	1975 Copenhagen	Mixed doubles
Silver medal – second place	1975 Copenhagen	Mixed team
Bronze medal – third place	1975 Copenhagen	Boys' doubles

Duncan P B Bridge (born 1958) is a retired male badminton player from England.

== Badminton career ==
Bridge represented England and won a gold medal in the team event and a silver medal in the mixed doubles with his sister Karen Beckman, at the 1982 Commonwealth Games in Brisbane, Queensland, Australia.
