= Claire Backhouse-Sharpe =

Canadian badminton player and coach (born 1958)

Personal information
- Birth name: Claire Backhouse
- Country: Canada
- Born: May 13, 1958 (age 67); Vancouver, British Columbia, Canada
- Height: 5 ft 8 in (1.73 m)
Medal record
Women's badminton
Representing Canada
Commonwealth Games
Gold medal – first place	1982 Brisbane	Women's doubles
Silver medal – second place	1978 Edmonton	Women's doubles
Silver medal – second place	1978 Edmonton	Mixed team
Silver medal – second place	1982 Brisbane	Mixed team
Silver medal – second place	1986 Edinburgh	Mixed team
Silver medal – second place	1990 Auckland	Mixed team
Pan American Championships
Gold medal – first place	1979 Mexico City	Women's doubles
Gold medal – first place	1979 Mexico City	Mixed doubles
Gold medal – first place	1979 Mexico City	Mixed team

Claire Backhouse-Sharpe (née Backhouse; born May 13, 1958) is a Canadian badminton player and coach. Between 1978 and 1994, she competed in five editions of the Commonwealth Games for Canada, winning a single gold medal and five silver medals. Backhouse-Sharpe also participated in the World Badminton Championships and Uber Cup on five occasions each as part of the Canada national badminton team. She won multiple national and regional titles and was assistant coach and manager of the British Columbia Badminton team at the 1994 Canada Winter Games and the 1995 Western Canada Games. Backhouse-Sharpe was inducted into the BC Sports Hall of Fame in 1997 and the Badminton Canada Hall of Fame.

== Personal background ==
On May 13, 1958, Backhouse-Sharpe was born in Vancouver, British Columbia, Canada, and her hometown was listed as Burnaby. She is the grand daughter of a squash player who won the British Open Squash Championship, and a tennis player who played at Wimbledon. Backhouse-Sharpe attended the University of British Columbia as an arts student. In mid-1985, she married vice-president of the British Columbia Badminton Association Doug Sharp. They have three children. Backhouse-Sharpe trained while pregnant with her third child, and frequently took her children to worldwide badminton events. She also worked in the federal government clerical department full-time outside of badminton.

== Career ==
Backhouse-Sharpe began playing badminton at age 12 combining her other interests in baseball, squash, street hockey and tennis. At 17, she decided to specialize in badminton. She began playing for the Canada national badminton team in either 1976 or 1977, and was listed at 5 ft 8 in (1.73 m) and 128 lb (58 kg). As a rookie and an unseeded entrant, Backhouse-Sharpe reached the semi-finals of the women's doubles at the 1978 All England Open Badminton Championships with her partner Jane Youngberg, defeating the Dutch and English sides in the preceding rounds before losing to the Japanese squad. She went on to claim silver medals in both the women's doubles with Youngberg and the mixed team event with five other Canadian players at the 1978 Commonwealth Games. Backhouse-Sharpe went on to win two gold medals in the doubles and mixed doubles at the 1979 Pan American Games.

She got affected by tendinitis in both her knees in late 1979, and underwent surgery in July 1980. Backhouse-Sharpe was one of ten badminton players to be selected by the Canadian Badminton Association to compete at the 1982 Commonwealth Games in Brisbane. There, she and Johanne Falardeau won the gold medal by defeating the No. 1 seeded English team in the final in the women's doubles and the silver medal with five other Canadians in the team competition. At the 1986 Commonwealth Games in Edinburgh, Backhouse-Sharpe won the silver medal for the mixed team competition in a side of six as well as competing in three other events without winning any medals. She was one of two representatives of Canada to be invited by the International Badminton Federation to enter the exhibition badminton tournament at the 1988 Summer Olympics in Seoul. At the 1990 Commonwealth Games in Auckland, Backhouse-Sharpe was part of the six-player silver medal winning squad of the mixed team competition. She participated in two events at the 1994 Commonwealth Games in Victoria but did not medal in either of them.

As a member of the Canada national badminton squad, she participated in the World Badminton Championships five times in 1978, 1980, 1983, 1985 and 1991 and the Uber Cup in 1978, 1981, 1984, 1986, 1988 and 1990. She took the U.S. Open Badminton Championships on eight occasions and the Canadian Open twice as well as winning fifteen Canadian national championships (two Junior, three Intermediate and ten Senior) and several Canadian National Grand Prix accolades and provincial titles. Backhouse-Sharpe was named the recipient of the Yonex Outstanding Canadian Player Award at both the 1982 Canadian Open and the 1984 German Open and was named the 1994 Badminton Canada Player of the Year.

Post-retirement, she was assistant coach and manager of the British Columbia Badminton squad at the 1994 Canada Winter Games and the 1995 Western Canada Games. Backhouse-Sharpe was influential in altering Sport Canada's Athlete Assistance Program policy in relation to parenthood, pregnancy and woman athletes. In May 1997, she was inducted into the BC Sports Hall of Fame in a ceremony at the Hotel Vancouver. Backhouse-Sharpe was elected to the board of directors of Badminton Canada on a one-year term starting in July 2018. She is a inductee of the Badminton Canada Hall of Fame for her playing career.

== Playing style ==
She played left-handed and had a strong smash that was improved upon when she commenced weight training. Backhouse-Sharpe trained six days a week and twice each day when possible; her training included aerobics classes, running and practice with fellow player Sandra Skillings.
