= Badminton World Invitational Championships =

Badminton Championships

World Invitation Championships was the invitational event in badminton, which was conducted in the absence of a world championship (the first badminton world championship took place only in 1977) brought together top players from all major badminton nations in a kind of unofficial world championship. The winner of this tournament is not called as the World Champions, since the players who compete are only those who receive invitations from the event organizer.

== About ==
Thirteen World Invitation Tournaments took place in Scotland from 1954 to 1974 at Kelvin Hall in Glasgow. In November 1972, the Asia hosted first World Invitation Tournament in Jakarta. Others followed in Jakarta in October 1974 and in Kuala Lumpur in September 1975. In 1972 only the men's competitions were held and in 1974 and 1975 the women's competitions were reintroduced. 1974 had two editions, first of which was held in Glasgow in March where the second one was held in Jakarta in the month of October. One edition of Invitational World Championship was hosted by now defunct World Badminton Federation (WBF) in 1978.

== Winners ==
Year	Host city	Men's singles	Women's singles	Men's doubles	Women's doubles	Mixed doubles
1954	Glasgow	(Malaysia) Eddy Choong	not conducted	(Malaysia) Ooi Teik Hock (Malaysia) Ong Poh Lim	(England) Iris Cooley (England) June White	(Denmark) Jørgen Hammergaard Hansen (Denmark) Birgit Schultz-Pedersen
1956	Glasgow	(United States) Joe Alston	not conducted	(Denmark) Jørgen Hammergaard Hansen (Denmark) Finn Kobberø	(United States) Margaret Varner (United States) Lois Alston	(Denmark) Finn Kobberø (Scotland) Marjory B. Forrester
1957	Glasgow	(Malaysia) Eddy Choong	not conducted	(Denmark) Jørgen Hammergaard Hansen (Denmark) Finn Kobberø	(United States) Margaret Varner (United States) Lois Alston	(England) John R. Best (England) Iris Rogers
1958	Glasgow	(Indonesia) Ferry Sonneville	not conducted	(Denmark) Jørgen Hammergaard Hansen (Denmark) Finn Kobberø	(United States) Margaret Varner (England) Heather Ward	(Denmark) Poul-Erik Nielsen (Denmark) Aase Winther
1959	Glasgow	(Thailand) Charoen Wattanasin	not conducted	(Malaysia) Teh Kew San (Malaysia) Lim Say Hup	(Scotland) Catherine Dunglison (Scotland) Wilma Tyre	(England) Tony Jordan (England) June Timperley
1960	Glasgow	(Denmark) Finn Kobberø	not conducted	(Denmark) Poul-Erik Nielsen (Denmark) Finn Kobberø	(United States) Margaret Varner (Thailand) Pratuang Pattabongse	(Denmark) Poul-Erik Nielsen (Denmark) Hanne Jensen
1962	Glasgow	(Thailand) Charoen Wattanasin	not conducted	(Denmark) Jørgen Hammergaard Hansen (Denmark) Finn Kobberø	(Denmark) Karin Jørgensen (Denmark) Ulla Rasmussen	(Scotland) Robert McCoig (Scotland) Wilma Tyre
1963	Glasgow	(Denmark) Erland Kops	not conducted	(Denmark) Poul-Erik Nielsen (Denmark) Erland Kops	(Denmark) Karin Jørgensen (Denmark) Ulla Rasmussen	(Denmark) Poul-Erik Nielsen (Denmark) Ulla Rasmussen
1965	Glasgow	(Denmark) Erland Kops	not conducted	(Malaysia) Tan Yee Khan (Malaysia) Ng Boon Bee	(England) Margaret Barrand (England) Jennifer Pritchard	(England) Tony Jordan (England) Jennifer Pritchard
1966	Glasgow	(Malaysia) Tan Aik Huang	not conducted	(Malaysia) Tan Yee Khan (Malaysia) Ng Boon Bee	(England) Margaret Barrand (England) Jennifer Pritchard	(England) Tony Jordan (England) Jennifer Pritchard
1969	Glasgow	(Malaysia) Tan Aik Huang	not conducted	(England) Tony Jordan (England) Roger Powell	(Japan) Noriko Takagi (Japan) Hiroe Amano	(England) Tony Jordan (England) Susan Whetnall
1971	Glasgow	(Sweden) Sture Johnsson	(Sweden) Eva Twedberg	(Scotland) Mac Henderson (Scotland) Jim Ansari	(Sweden) Eva Twedberg (Scotland) Maureen Hume	(Scotland) Fraser Gow (Scotland) Joanne Flockhart
1972	Jakarta	(Indonesia) Rudy Hartono	not conducted	(Indonesia) Tjun Tjun (Indonesia) Johan Wahjudi	not conducted	
1974 (March)	Glasgow	(Denmark) Svend Pri	(Japan) Hiroe Yuki	(Malaysia) Punch Gunalan (Malaysia) Dominic Soong	(Japan) Machiko Aizawa (Japan) Etsuko Takenaka	(Scotland) Robert McCoig (England) Margaret Beck
1974 (October)	Jakarta	(Denmark) Svend Pri	(England) Margaret Beck	(Indonesia) Tjun Tjun (Indonesia) Johan Wahjudi	(Indonesia) Minarni (Indonesia) Regina Masli	(Indonesia) Christian Hadinata (Indonesia) Regina Masli
1975	Kuala Lumpur	(Indonesia) Liem Swie King	(Japan) Hiroe Yuki	(Indonesia) Tjun Tjun (Indonesia) Johan Wahjudi	(England) Margaret Beck (England) Gillian Gilks	(Indonesia) Christian Hadinata (Indonesia) Regina Masli
1978 (WBF)	Hong Kong	(China) Chen Tianlung	(China) Liang Qiuxia	(China) Lin Shiquan (China) Tang Xianhu	(China) Li Fang (China) Liang Qiuxia	(Hong Kong) Fu Han Ping (Hong Kong) Amy Chan

== Performances by nation ==
Ranking	Country	MS	WS	MD	WD	XD	Total
1	Denmark	5		6	2	4.5	17.5
2	England		1	1	4.5	6.5	13
3	Indonesia	3		3	1	2	9
3	Malaysia	4		5			9
4	Scotland			1	1.5	3	5.5
5	China	1	1	1	1		4
5	Japan		2		2		4
5	United States	1			3		4
6	Sweden	1	1		0.5		2.5
6	Thailand	2			0.5		2.5
7	Hong Kong					1	1
