= 1989 IBF World Championships – Men's singles =

Badminton championships

Men's singles at the 1989 IBF World Championships
- Venue: Istora Senayan
- Location: Jakarta, Indonesia
- Dates: 29 May – 4 June

Medalists
gold medal	Yang Yang	China
silver medal	Ardy Wiranata	Indonesia
bronze medal	Icuk Sugiarto	Indonesia
bronze medal	Eddy Kurniawan	Indonesia

The 1989 IBF World Championships were held in Jakarta, Indonesia, in 1989. Below are the results of the men's singles.

== Main stage ==
=== Section 1 ===
First round
(China) Yang Yang	15	15
(Poland) Grzegorz Olchowik	1	2
(Thailand) Pramote Teerawiwatana	15	15
(New Zealand) Kerrin Harrison	5	13
(Finland) Robert Liljequist	7	15	16
(Nepal) Pratap Adhikari	15	13	18
(Japan) Yasumasa Tsujita	15	15
(Bulgaria) Jeliazko Valkov	6	8
(Indonesia) Alan Budikusuma	15	15
(Germany) Volker Eiber	5	4
(Sweden) Peter Axelsson	15	11	13
(Malaysia) Hwang Fung	3	15	15
(India) Vimal Kumar	15	15
(France) Pascal Pak	0	4
(England) Anders Nielsen	w	/	o
(Pakistan) Mirza Ali Yar Beg

Second round
(China) Yang Yang	15	15
(Thailand) Pramote Teerawiwatana	10	4
(Nepal) Pratap Adhikari
(Japan) Yasumasa Tsujita
(Indonesia) Alan Budikusuma	15	15
(Malaysia) Hwang Fung	5	2
(India) Vimal Kumar	15	13	15
(England) Anders Nielsen	10	15	13

Third round
(China) Yang Yang	15	15
(Japan) Yasumasa Tsujita	3	6
(Indonesia) Alan Budikusuma	15	15
(India) Vimal Kumar	8	4

Fourth round
(China) Yang Yang	15	15
(Indonesia) Alan Budikusuma	10	3

=== Section 2 ===
First round
(Denmark) Poul-Erik Høyer Larsen	9	15	15
(Netherlands) Pierre Pelupessy	15	10	10
(South Korea) Lee Kwang-jin	15	10	15
(Hong Kong) Yeung Yik Kei	9	15	4
(Soviet Union) Sergey Sevryukov
(Sweden) Stellan Österberg	w	/	o
(Bulgaria) Yasen Borisov
(United States) Benny Lee	w	/	o
(Indonesia) Lius Pongoh	15	15
(Canada) Mike Butler	7	7
(Malaysia) Clarence Tim	5	12
(Thailand) Sompol Kukasemkij	15	15
(Japan) Hiroshi Nishiyama	18	15
(Australia) Gordon Lang	16	5
(Scotland) Anthony Gallagher	16	15	15
(Austria) Heinz Fischer	17	4	3

Second round
(Denmark) Poul-Erik Høyer Larsen	15	15
(South Korea) Lee Kwang-jin	4	13
(Sweden) Stellan Österberg	7	10
(United States) Benny Lee	15	15
(Indonesia) Lius Pongoh	15	15
(Thailand) Sompol Kukasemkij	11	5
(Japan) Hiroshi Nishiyama	18	15	2
(Scotland) Anthony Gallagher	16	18	15

Third round
(Denmark) Poul-Erik Høyer Larsen	15	15
(United States) Benny Lee	8	2
(Indonesia) Lius Pongoh	15	15
(Scotland) Anthony Gallagher	0	5

Fourth round
(Denmark) Poul-Erik Høyer Larsen	15	15
(Indonesia) Lius Pongoh	3	9

=== Section 3 ===
First round
(Indonesia) Icuk Sugiarto	15	15
(Australia) Paul Stevenson	3	9
(Poland) Jacek Hankiewicz	15	15
(Austria) Klaus Fischer	13	8
(United States) Karl Knudsen	5	7
(New Zealand) Philip Horne	15	15
(Peru) Federico Valdez	15	9	11
(France) Christophe Jeanjean	7	15	15
(China) Wu Wenkai	15	15
(Germany) Stephan Kuhl	5	1
(Sri Lanka) Niroshan Wijekoon	7	7
(South Korea) Kim Hak-kyun	15	15
(Myanmar) Maung Naing Myint	w	/	o
(Netherlands) Alex Meijer
(Soviet Union) Andreij Antropov	15	15
(Norway) Øyvind Berntsen	3	3

Second round
(Indonesia) Icuk Sugiarto	15	15
(Poland) Jacek Hankiewicz	3	9
(New Zealand) Philip Horne	15	15
(France) Christophe Jeanjean	3	12
(China) Wu Wenkai	15	12	10
(South Korea) Kim Hak-kyun	6	15	15
(Myanmar) Maung Naing Myint	5	8
(Soviet Union) Andreij Antropov	15	15

Third round
(Indonesia) Icuk Sugiarto	15	15
(New Zealand) Philip Horne	0	3
(South Korea) Kim Hak-kyun	11	15	18
(Soviet Union) Andreij Antropov	15	4	13

Fourth round
(Indonesia) Icuk Sugiarto	15	15
(South Korea) Kim Hak-kyun	2	1

=== Section 4 ===
First round
(China) Zhao Jianhua	15	15
(Mauritius) Jean-Michel Duverge	1	7
(Scotland) Kevin Scott	15	15
(Bulgaria) Stojan Ivantchev	13	6
(Japan) Shinji Matsuura	12	9
(Singapore) Abdul Hamid Khan	15	15
(South Korea) Kwang Min-phyun	18	3	6
(Thailand) Surachai Makkasasithorn	17	15	15
(England) Steve Baddeley	15	15
(Chinese Taipei) Chang Wen-sung	6	5
(India) Praveen Kumar
(Switzerland) Hubert Müller	w	/	o
(Sweden) Jens Olsson	3	15	15
(Finland) Pontus Jäntti	15	12	4
(Malaysia) Wong Tat Meng	15	15
(New Zealand) Kevin Ross	2	12

Second round
(China) Zhao Jianhua	15	15
(Scotland) Kevin Scott	8	1
(Singapore) Abdul Hamid Khan	15	13	14
(Thailand) Surachai Makkasasithorn	2	18	15
(England) Steve Baddeley	15	15
(Switzerland) Hubert Müller	3	5
(Sweden) Jens Olsson	9	15	15
(Malaysia) Wong Tat Meng	15	10	11

Third round
(China) Zhao Jianhua	15	15
(Thailand) Surachai Makkasasithorn	6	2
(England) Steve Baddeley	15	15
(Sweden) Jens Olsson	3	6

Fourth round
(China) Zhao Jianhua	15	10	15
(England) Steve Baddeley	8	15	4

=== Section 5 ===
First round
(Sweden) Pär-Gunnar Jönsson	18	12	15
(Canada) John Goss	13	15	10
(China) Liu Jun	w	/	o
(United States) Peter Baum
(Pakistan) Tariq Farooq	10	4
(Malaysia) Mustaffa Ali	15	15
(Thailand) Pulsak Thewarangsee	7	6
(England) Darren Hall	15	15
(New Zealand) Glenn Stewart	15	15
(Finland) Lasse Lindelöf	8	9
(Bulgaria) Stanimir Boitchinov	8	3
(Soviet Union) Igor Dmitriev	15	15
(Scotland) Kenny Middlemiss	15	15
(France) Stéphane Renault	10	5
(Indonesia) Eddy Kurniawan	15	15
(India) Sushant Bora	7	7

Second round
(Sweden) Pär-Gunnar Jönsson	8	15	15
(China) Liu Jun	15	11	7
(Malaysia) Mustaffa Ali	8	15	15
(England) Darren Hall	15	2	18
(New Zealand) Glenn Stewart	12	15	11
(Soviet Union) Igor Dmitriev	15	1	15
(Scotland) Kenny Middlemiss	12	1
(Indonesia) Eddy Kurniawan	15	15

Third round
(Sweden) Pär-Gunnar Jönsson	8	15	15
(England) Darren Hall	15	11	7
(Soviet Union) Igor Dmitriev	4	13
(Indonesia) Eddy Kurniawan	15	18

Fourth round
(Sweden) Pär-Gunnar Jönsson	11	5
(Indonesia) Eddy Kurniawan	15	15

=== Section 6 ===
First round
(Thailand) Vacharapan Khamthong	5'	15	15
(Sweden) Mikael Rosén	15	5	8
(South Korea) Choi Sang-bum	15	15
(Hong Kong) Tse Bun	9	7
(Poland) Janusz Czerwieniec	8	4
(Malaysia) Kwan Yoke Meng	15	15
(Denmark) Jens Peter Nierhoff	6	11
(Netherlands) Rob Stalenhoef	15	15
(Sri Lanka) Duminda Jayakody	15	15
(Nepal) Prakash Doj Rana	12	6
(Australia) Michael Scandolera	6	15	5
(New Zealand) Dean Galt	15	8	15
(Germany) Guido Schänzler	7	15	15
(Japan) Shuji Matsuno	15	8	6
(China) Xiong Guobao	w	/	o
(Pakistan) Muhammad Tariq Sharif

Second round
(Thailand) Vacharapan Khamthong	7	6
(South Korea) Choi Sang-bum	15	15
(Malaysia) Kwan Yoke Meng	17	15	15
(Netherlands) Rob Stalenhoef	18	9	3
(Sri Lanka) Duminda Jayakody	9	10
(New Zealand) Dean Galt	15	15
(Germany) Guido Schänzler	2	5
(China) Xiong Guobao	15	15

Third round
(South Korea) Choi Sang-bum	15	15	12
(Malaysia) Kwan Yoke Meng	17	10	15
(New Zealand) Dean Galt	5	4
(China) Xiong Guobao	15	18

Fourth round
(Malaysia) Kwan Yoke Meng	6	2
(China) Xiong Guobao	15	15

=== Section 7 ===
First round
(Scotland) Jim Mailer	12	15	15
(Peru) Gustavo Salazar	15	12	11
(England) Steve Butler	w	/	o
(Bulgaria) Boris Lalov
bye
bye
(Iceland) Broddi Kristjánsson	4	4
(Malaysia) Foo Kok Keong	15	15
(Finland) Tony Tuominen	15	15
(Japan) Hiroki Eto	11	7
(Thailand) Karun Kasayapanant	6	5
(Indonesia) Hermawan Susanto	15	15
(Canada) Bryan Blanshard	12	15	15
(New Zealand) Graeme Robson	15	5	9
(China) Zhang Qingwu	15	15
(Germany) Markus Keck	13	2

Second round
(Scotland) Jim Mailer	2	0
(England) Steve Butler	15	15
bye
(Malaysia) Foo Kok Keong
(Finland) Tony Tuominen	3	8
(Indonesia) Hermawan Susanto	15	15
(Canada) Bryan Blanshard	0	3
(China) Zhang Qingwu	15	15

Third round
(England) Steve Butler	15	15
(Malaysia) Foo Kok Keong	2	10
(Indonesia) Hermawan Susanto	11	15	15
(China) Zhang Qingwu	15	12	8

Fourth round
(England) Steve Butler	15	1	11
(Indonesia) Hermawan Susanto	6	15	15

=== Section 8 ===
First round
(Myanmar) Tun Htein Win	13	15	15
(Sweden) Jonas Herrgardh	18	3	8
(Norway) Hans Sperre Jr.	15	15
(Netherlands) Uun Santosa	8	8
(Chinese Taipei) Liu En-hung	15	13	15
(Japan) Eishi Kibune	3	15	8
(India) Manoj Kumar
(Indonesia) Ardy Wiranata	w	/	o
(United States) Chris Jogis	15	15
(Hong Kong) Chan Siu Kwong	6	10
(France) Franck Panel	6	3
(South Korea) Ahn Jae-chang	15	15
(Soviet Union) Vitaliy Shmakov	w	/	o
(Scotland) Dan Travers	15	5	9
(Denmark) Morten Frost	w	/	o
(Pakistan) Mir Tahir Ishaq

Second round
(Myanmar) Tun Htein Win	15	15
(Norway) Hans Sperre Jr.	4	8
(Chinese Taipei) Liu En-hung	4	2
(Indonesia) Ardy Wiranata	15	15
(United States) Chris Jogis	10	5
(South Korea) Ahn Jae-chang	15	15
(Soviet Union) Vitaliy Shmakov	8	5
(Denmark) Morten Frost	15	15

Third round
(Myanmar) Tun Htein Win	7	0
(Indonesia) Ardy Wiranata	15	15
(South Korea) Ahn Jae-chang	15	5
(Denmark) Morten Frost	17	15

Fourth round
(Indonesia) Ardy Wiranata	15	15
(Denmark) Morten Frost	11	2

== Final stage ==
Quarterfinals
1	(China) Yang Yang	15	15
8	(Denmark) Poul-Erik Høyer Larsen	11	7
4	(Indonesia) Icuk Sugiarto	15	1	17
5	(China) Zhao Jianhua	8	15	15
3	(Indonesia) Eddy Kurniawan	15	15
6	(China) Xiong Guobao	10	13
2	(Indonesia) Hermawan Susanto	8	11
7	(Indonesia) Ardy Wiranata	15	15

Semifinals
(China) Yang Yang	13	15	15
(Indonesia) Icuk Sugiarto	15	7	9
(Indonesia) Eddy Kurniawan	18	10	13
(Indonesia) Ardy Wiranata	14	15	15

Finals
(China) Yang Yang	15	2	15
(Indonesia) Ardy Wiranata	10	15	5
