= 1978 European Mixed Team Badminton Championships =

Tournament details
- Dates: 9–11 April 1978
- Edition: 4
- Venue: Guild Hall
- Location: Preston, England

The 1978 European Mixed Team Badminton Championships were held in Preston, England, from 9 to 11 April 1978. The tournament was hosted by the European Badminton Union and the Badminton Association of England. The tournament was held at the Guild Hall.

== Medalists ==
Event	Gold	Silver	Bronze
Mixed team	England; David Eddy; Kevin Jolly; Ray Stevens; Eddy Sutton; Mike Tredgett; Karen Bridge; Nora Perry; Anne Statt; Barbara Sutton; Jane Webster	Denmark; Flemming Delfs; Steen Fladberg; Jesper Helledie; Steen Skovgaard; Inge Borgstrøm; Lonny Bostofte; Lene Køppen; Pia Nielsen; Imre Nielsen	Sweden; Bengt Fröman; Sture Johnsson; Stefan Karlsson; Thomas Kihlström; Claes Nordin; Anette Börjesson; Britt-Marie Larsson

== Draw ==
A total of fifteen teams competed in the championships. Italy and Portugal made their first appearance in the championships.

Group 1	Group 2	Group 3	Group 4
Denmark; England (Host); Netherlands; Sweden	West Germany; Scotland; Soviet Union	Austria; Ireland; Norway; Wales	Belgium; Italy; Portugal; Switzerland

== Group 1 ==
Pos	Team	W	L	MF	MA	MD	Pts	Qualification
1	England	3	0	10	5	+5	3	Champions
2	Denmark	2	1	9	6	+3	2	Runners-up
3	Sweden	1	2	7	8	−1	1	Third place
4	Netherlands	0	3	4	11	−6	0	Advance to play-offs

=== England vs Sweden ===
England
4
Guild Hall
9 April 1978

Sweden
1

			1	2	3
1	(England) (Sweden)	Derek Talbot; Sture Johnsson	15; 6	17; 14
2	(England) (Sweden)	Karen Bridge; Anette Börjesson	11; 5	10; 12	6; 11
3	(England) (Sweden)	Ray Stevens / Mike Tredgett; Bengt Fröman / Thomas Kihlström	13; 15	15; 11	15; 3
4	(England) (Sweden)	Nora Perry / Anne Statt; Britt-Marie Larsson / Agneta Lundh	15; 5	15; 3
5	(England) (Sweden)	Mike Tredgett / Nora Perry; Lars Wengberg / Anette Börjesson	15; 9	15; 6

=== Denmark vs Netherlands ===
Denmark
4
Guild Hall
9 April 1978

Netherlands
1

			1	2	3
1	(Denmark) (Netherlands)	Lene Køppen; Joke van Beusekom	11; 6	11; 6
2	(Denmark) (Netherlands)	Flemming Delfs / Elo Hansen; Herman Leidelmeijer / Rob Ridder	15; 6	15; 9
3	(Denmark) (Netherlands)	Inge Borgstrøm / Pia Nielsen; Marjan Ridder / Joke van Beusekom	11; 15	14; 17
4	(Denmark) (Netherlands)	Flemming Delfs; Guus van der Vlugt	15; 6	15; 4
5	(Denmark) (Netherlands)	Steen Skovgaard / Lene Køppen; Rob Ridder / Marjan Ridder	15; 8	15; 9

=== England vs Netherlands ===
England
3
Guild Hall
10 April 1978

Netherlands
2

			1	2	3
1	(England) (Netherlands)	Jane Webster; Joke van Beusekom	7; 11	3; 11
2	(England) (Netherlands)	Derek Talbot; Rob Ridder	11; 15	15; 7	13; 18
3	(England) (Netherlands)	Nora Perry / Barbara Sutton; Marjan Ridder / Joke van Beusekom	15; 4	15; 10
4	(England) (Netherlands)	Ray Stevens / Mike Tredgett; Herman Leidelmeijer / Guus van der Vlugt	15; 8	15; 9
5	(England) (Netherlands)	Mike Tredgett / Nora Perry; Rob Ridder / Marjan Ridder	15; 3	15; 5

=== Denmark vs Sweden ===
Denmark
3
Guild Hall
10 April 1978

Sweden
2

			1	2	3
1	(Denmark) (Sweden)	Flemming Delfs; Sture Johnsson	15; 6	18; 13
2	(Denmark) (Sweden)	Lene Køppen; Anette Börjesson	11; 7	11; 2
3	(Denmark) (Sweden)	Flemming Delfs / Steen Skovgaard; Bengt Fröman / Thomas Kihlström	15; 10	10; 15	4; 11	retired
4	(Denmark) (Sweden)	Inge Borgstrøm / Pia Nielsen; Britt-Marie Larsson / Agneta Lundh	15; 7	15; 6
5	(Denmark) (Sweden)	Steen Fladberg / Lene Køppen; Lars Wengberg / Anette Börjesson	15; 8	11; 15	8; 15

=== Denmark vs England ===
Denmark
2
Guild Hall
11 April 1978

England
3

			1	2	3
1	(Denmark) (England)	Flemming Delfs; Derek Talbot	15; 5	15; 2
2	(Denmark) (England)	Lene Køppen; Jane Webster	11; 1	11; 4
3	(Denmark) (England)	Flemming Delfs / Steen Skovgaard; Ray Stevens / Mike Tredgett	4; 15	15; 6	13; 15
4	(Denmark) (England)	Inge Borgstrøm / Pia Nielsen; Nora Perry / Anne Statt	11; 15	4; 15
5	(Denmark) (England)	Steen Skovgaard / Lene Køppen; Mike Tredgett / Nora Perry	13; 15	11; 15

=== Sweden vs Netherlands ===
Sweden
4
Guild Hall
11 April 1978

Netherlands
1

			1	2	3
1	(Sweden) (Netherlands)	Sture Johnsson; Rob Ridder	15; 4	15; 7
2	(Sweden) (Netherlands)	Anette Börjesson; Marjan Ridder	11; 7	11; 1
3	(Sweden) (Netherlands)	Bengt Fröman / Thomas Kihlström; Herman Leidelmeijer / Guus van der Vlugt	15; 4	15; 11
4	(Sweden) (Netherlands)	Britt-Marie Larsson / Agneta Lundh; Marjan Ridder / Joke van Beusekom	6; 15	8; 15
5	(Sweden) (Netherlands)	Anette Börjesson / Thomas Kihlström; Rob Ridder / Marjan Ridder	15; 7	15; 10

== Group 2 ==
Pos	Team	W	L	MF	MA	MD	Pts	Qualification
1	West Germany	2	0	8	2	+6	2	Advance to play-offs
2	Scotland	1	1	5	5	0	1	
3	Soviet Union	0	2	2	8	−6	0	Advance to play-offs

=== Scotland vs Soviet Union ===
Scotland
4
Guild Hall
9 April 1978

Soviet Union
1

			1	2	3
1	(Scotland) (Soviet Union)	Anthony Dawson; Anatoliy Skripko	6; 15	1; 15
2	(Scotland) (Soviet Union)	Billy Gilliland / Fraser Gow; Nikolay Peshekhonov / Konstantin Vavilov	15; 5	15; 8
3	(Scotland) (Soviet Union)	Joanne Flockhart / Christine Stewart; Nadezhda Litvincheva / Alla Prodan	15; 2	15; 5
4	(Scotland) (Soviet Union)	Pamela Hamilton; Svetlana Beliasova	12; 11	12; 11
5	(Scotland) (Soviet Union)	Billy Gilliland / Joanne Flockhart; Viktor Shvachko / Nadezhda Litvincheva	15; 12	15; 6

=== West Germany vs Soviet Union ===
West Germany
4
Guild Hall
10 April 1978

Soviet Union
1

			1	2	3
1	(West Germany) (Soviet Union)	Michael Schnaase; Anatoliy Skripko	8; 15	3; 15
2	(West Germany) (Soviet Union)	Eva-Maria Zwiebler; Svetlana Beliasova	11; 2	11; 5
3	(West Germany) (Soviet Union)	Roland Maywald / Karl-Heinz Zwiebler; Nikolay Peshekhonov / Konstantin Vavilov	15; 12	15; 11
4	(West Germany) (Soviet Union)	Vera Martini / Marieluise Zizmann; Nadezhda Litvincheva / Alla Prodan	15; 8	15; 7
5	(West Germany) (Soviet Union)	Roland Maywald / Marieluise Zizmann; Viktor Shvachko / Nadezhda Litvincheva	15; 10	15; 9

=== West Germany vs Scotland ===
West Germany
4
Guild Hall
11 April 1978

Scotland
1

			1	2	3
1	(West Germany) (Scotland)	Eva-Maria Zwiebler; Pamela Hamilton	12; 9	11; 0
2	(West Germany) (Scotland)	Roland Maywald / Karl-Heinz Zwiebler; Billy Gilliland / Fraser Gow	5; 15	5; 15
3	(West Germany) (Scotland)	Vera Martini / Marieluise Zizmann; Joanne Flockhart / Christine Stewart	15; 10	1; 15	15; 3
4	(West Germany) (Scotland)	Michael Schnaase; Anthony Dawson	15; 4	15; 8
5	(West Germany) (Scotland)	Roland Maywald / Marieluise Zizmann; Billy Gilliland / Joanne Flockhart	5; 15	15; 9	15; 11

== Group 3 ==
Pos	Team	W	L	MF	MA	MD	Pts	Qualification
1	Ireland	3	0	13	2	+11	3	Advance to play-offs
2	Norway	2	1	9	6	+3	2	
3	Wales	1	2	7	8	−1	1	
4	Austria	0	3	1	14	−13	0	Advance to play-offs

=== Fixtures ===
Team 1	Score	Team 2
Ireland	4–1	Wales
Norway	4–1	Austria
Ireland	5–0	Austria
Wales	1–4	Norway
Ireland	4–1	Norway
Wales	5–0	Austria

== Group 4 ==
Pos	Team	W	L	MF	MA	MD	Pts	Qualification
1	Belgium	3	0	13	2	+11	3	Advance to play-offs
2	Switzerland	2	1	12	3	+9	2	
3	Portugal	1	2	5	10	−5	1	
4	Italy	0	3	0	15	−15	0	

=== Fixtures ===
Team 1	Score	Team 2
Belgium	5–0	Portugal
Switzerland	5–0	Italy
Belgium	5–0	Italy
Switzerland	5–0	Portugal
Belgium	3–2	Switzerland
Portugal	5–0	Italy

== Inter-divisional play-offs ==
Team 1	Score	Team 2
Netherlands	2–3	West Germany
Soviet Union	1–4	Ireland
Austria	3–2	Belgium
