= Russell Hogg =

Scottish badminton player

Personal information
- Nationality: British (Scottish)
- Born: 7 January 1968 Dunfermline, Fife, Scotland
- Died: 17 September 2012 (aged 44)
- Height: 1.7 m (5 ft 7 in)

Sport
- Country: Scotland
- Sport: Badminton
- Handedness: Right
- Coached by: Dan Travers
- Retired: 2003

Doubles
- Highest ranking: 8 (Mixed doubles); 17 (Men's doubles)
- BWF profile
Medal record
Men's badminton
Representing Scotland
Commonwealth Games
Bronze medal – third place	2002 Manchester	Mixed team

Russell Hogg (7 January 1968 – 17 September 2012) was a Scottish badminton player. He reached a career high as world number 8 and has a number of titles to his name. Hogg competed at the 1994, 1998 and 2002 Commonwealth Games, and won a mixed team bronze in 2002.

== Biography ==
Dunfermline-born Hogg started playing badminton with the age 10. His father Harry Hogg was the Defence of Ministry worker. Hogg spent two years in Mauritius and after that he studied in St Leonard's Primary, Dunfermline, where his mother Moira was a teacher. It was his father, also a badminton coach, who introduced him to the sport. Hogg was exceptionally hard-working, developing his game at Alloa Badminton Club to win European gold medal in the under-14 category. Although he played badminton, he was an enthusiastic cricket player too. He had represented Scotland's under-16s and served as captain of Fife County Cricket Club for a season. Hogg finally found his way into the badminton and began developing his game to be the country's elite doubles player. He won Scottish national junior championships for 5 times. He left school around 1986 to work in administration with the Ministry of Defence at Rosyth Dockyard and it was the same time that he made his Scotland debut.

Between 1991 and 2002 he won the men's doubles at the Scottish National Badminton Championships nine times, eight of them with Kenny Middlemiss. He also won the mixed doubles title twice with Kirsteen McEwan in 2001 and 2003.

On the world tournament circuit he reached a career best of No. 8 in mixed doubles and No. 17 in men's doubles. he represented the Scottish team at the 1994 Commonwealth Games in Victoria, Canada, where he competed in the badminton events.

After retiring from playing career he worked for North Ayrshire Leisure as badminton development manager before joining the Badminton Scotland staff in November 2004 as national development manager. His wife Julie Hogg whom he met while he was 12 was also the badminton player. Hogg was third most-capped player in the country, with 117 appearances, and had the hands-on experience that also made him a respected coach and mentor. He mentored the Scottish team in the 2012 Olympic Games. Hogg died on 17 September 2012, aged 44, due to skin cancer.

== Achievements ==
=== IBF International ===
Men's doubles
Year	Tournament	Partner	Opponent	Score	Result
1989	Irish International	(Scotland) Anthony Gallagher	(Scotland) Kenny Middlemiss (Scotland) Dan Travers	6–15, 6–15	(silver) Runner-up
1990	Gibraltar International	(England) Ian Teasdale	(Portugal) Ricardo Fernandes (Portugal) Jose Sim Sim	15–2, 15–5	(gold) Winner
1992	Gibraltar International	(England) Richard Outterside	–, –	–, –	(gold) Winner
1992	Iceland International	(Scotland) Kenny Middlemiss	(England) Simon Archer (England) Julian Robertson	9–15, 9–15	(silver) Runner-up
1992	Amor International	(Scotland) Kenny Middlemiss	(Iceland) Broddi Kristjánsson (Iceland) Árni Þór Hallgrímson	15–4, 15–12	(gold) Winner
1993	Gibraltar International	(England) Paul Hutchinson	(England) Kelvin Edwards (England) Paul Ruthven	15–5, 7–15, 15–1	(gold) Winner
1997	Portugal International	(Scotland) Kenny Middlemiss	(Spain) Hugo Rodrigues (Spain) Fernando Silva	Walkover	(silver) Runner-up
1997	Slovenian International	(Scotland) Kenny Middlemiss	(Austria) Harald Koch (Austria) Jürgen Koch	18–14, 15–5	(gold) Winner
1999	La Chaux-de-Fonds	(Scotland) Kenny Middlemiss	(Indonesia) Aras Razak (Denmark) Henrik Sørensen	10–15, 9–15	(silver) Runner-up
1999	Scottish International	(Scotland) Kenny Middlemiss	(Denmark) Michael Lamp (Denmark) Jonas Rasmussen	8–15, 11–15	(silver) Runner-up
2000	New Zealand International	(Scotland) Robert Blair	(New Zealand) John Gordon (New Zealand) Daniel Shirley	16–17, 7–15	(silver) Runner-up
2000	Irish International	(Scotland) Robert Blair	(Scotland) Alastair Gatt (Scotland) Craig Robertson	15–12, 12–15, 5–15	(silver) Runner-up

Mixed doubles
Year	Tournament	Partner	Opponent	Score	Result
1990	Gibraltar International	(England) J Steen	(England) Ian Teasdale (England) R. Ambrose	12–15, 15–9, 7–15	(silver) Runner-up
1993	Gibraltar International	(Scotland) Julie Hogg	(England) Paul Steel (England) Sue Tromp	15–10, 15–7	(gold) Winner
1997	Portugal International	(England) Karen Peatfield	(Scotland) Kenny Middlemiss (Scotland) Elinor Middlemiss	Walkover	(gold) Winner
1997	Slovenian International	(Scotland) Jillian Haldane	(Scotland) Kenny Middlemiss (Scotland) Elinor Middlemiss	10–15, 8–15	(silver) Runner-up
1997	Scottish International	(England) Tracy Dineen	(Denmark) Lars Paaske (Denmark) Jane F. Bramsen	6–15, 2–15	(silver) Runner-up
1998	Irish International	(Scotland) Alexis Barlow	(Belgium) Ruud Kuijten (Belgium) Manon Albinus	7–15, 9–15	(silver) Runner-up
2000	Slovenian International	(Scotland) Kirsteen McEwan	(Denmark) Mathias Boe (Denmark) Britta Andersen	9–15, 3–15	(silver) Runner-up
2000	Le Volant d'Or de Toulouse	(Scotland) Kirsteen McEwan	(Germany) Björn Siegemund (Germany) Nicol Pitro	5–15, 11–15	(silver) Runner-up
2000	Irish Open	(Scotland) Kirsteen McEwan	(England) Graham Hurrell (England) Sara Hardaker	15–9, 15–8	(gold) Winner
2001	Slovenian International	(Scotland) Kirsteen McEwan	(Russia) Nikolai Zuyev (Russia) Marina Yakusheva	5–7, 3–7, 2–7	(silver) Runner-up
2002	Croatian International	(Scotland) Kirsteen McEwan	(Australia) Travis Denney (Australia) Kate Wilson-Smith	7–3, 8–6, 7–2	(gold) Winner
