= David Gilmour (badminton) =

Scottish international badminton player

Personal information
- Nationality: British (Scottish)
- Born: 9 February 1971

Sport
- Sport: Badminton
- Club: Hamilton
Medal record
Representing Scotland
Scottish Nationals
Gold medal – first place	1997	mixed
Gold medal – first place	2004–2006, 08	doubles

David Gilmour (born 9 February 1971) is a former international badminton player from Scotland who competed at the Commonwealth Games.

== Biography ==
Gilmour born in 1971, and a production planner by profession, was based in Hamilton, South Lanarkshire and represented Scotland at international level.

After two seasons recovering from a serious injury, Gilmour returned to competition in late 1993, despite being told by doctors that he would not play at elite level again and subsequently won the Scottish invitational singles, Dunfermline Open and East of Scotland Championships in January 1994.

The following season in 1995, he went on to become the number 1 ranked player in Scotland and in 1997 won the mixed doubles title with Elinor Middlemiss at the Scottish National Badminton Championships.

Gilmour represented the Scottish team at the 1998 Commonwealth Games in Kuala Lumpur, Malaysia, where he competed in the badminton events.

He won four men's doubles championships with Craig Robertson and Andrew Bowman respectively at the Scottish National Badminton Championships.

His niece is Scottish international badminton player Kirsty Gilmour.
