= Badminton at the 1986 Commonwealth Games =

- Venue: Edinburgh
- Dates: 24 July - 2 August 1986

The badminton competition at the 1986 Commonwealth Games took place at the Meadowbank Sports Centre in Edinburgh, Scotland from 24 July until 2 August 1986.

== Medal table ==
* Host nation (Scotland)

Rank	Nation	Gold	Silver	Bronze	Total
1	England	4	3	3	10
2	Australia	1	1	1	3
3	Scotland*	1	0	1	2
4	Canada	0	2	0	2
5	New Zealand	0	0	1	1
Totals (5 entries)		6	6	6	18

== Medallists ==
Category	Gold	Silver	Bronze
Men's singles	(England) Steve Baddeley	(Australia) Sze Yu	(England) Nick Yates
Women's singles	(England) Helen Troke	(England) Fiona Elliott	(England) Gillian Clark
Men's doubles	(Scotland) Billy Gilliland & Dan Travers	(England) Andy Goode & Nigel Tier	(New Zealand) Kerrin Harrison & Glenn Stewart
Women's doubles	(England) Gillian Clark & Gillian Gowers	(Canada) Denyse Julien & Johanne Falardeau	(England) Helen Troke & Fiona Elliott
Mixed doubles	(Australia) Michael Scandolera & Audrey Tuckey	(England) Andy Goode & Fiona Elliott	(Scotland) Billy Gilliland & Christine Heatly
Mixed team	England	Canada	Australia

== Finals ==
Category	Winner	Runner-up	Score
Men's singles	Steve Baddeley (ENG)	Sze Yu (AUS)	15–8, 15–8
Women's singles	Helen Troke (ENG)	Fiona Elliott (ENG)	11–4, 11–4
Men's doubles	Billy Gilliland; Dan Travers (SCO)	Andy Goode; Nigel Tier (ENG)	15–8, 15-5
Women's doubles	Gillian Clark; Gillian Gowers (ENG)	Denyse Julien; Johanne Falardeau (CAN)	15–6, 15–7
Mixed doubles	Michael Scandolera; Audrey Tuckey (AUS)	Andy Goode; Fiona Elliott (ENG)	15–7, 15-5
Mixed team	England	Canada	5-0

== Results ==
=== Men's singles ===
Round of 16
1	(England) Steve Baddeley	15	15
16	(Australia) Darren McDonald	4	8
8	(New Zealand) Graeme Robson	15	15
9	(Guernsey) Liam McKenna	3	4
5	(Scotland) Alex White	15	15
12	(Hong Kong) Yeung Yik Kei	6	2
4	(Canada) Mike Butler	15	15
13	(New Zealand) Kerrin Harrison	5	8
6	(Australia) Sze Yu	15	15
11	(New Zealand) Glenn Stewart	8	1
3	(Scotland) Kenny Middlemiss	15	15
14	(Canada) John Goss	5	9
7	(England) Nick Yates	15	15
10	(Hong Kong) Lai Hung	1	2
2	(New Zealand) Phil Horne	w/o
15	(Australia) Michael Scandolera	scr

Quarter-finals
(England) Baddeley	15	15
(New Zealand) Robson	5	9
(Scotland) White	15	15
(Canada) Butler	2	6
(Australia) Sze Yu	15	15
(Scotland) Middlemass	4	0
(England) Yates	15	15
(New Zealand) Horne	2	2

Semi-finals
(England) Baddeley	15	15
(Scotland) White	10	4
(Australia) Sze Yu	15	15
(England) Yates	6	9

Final
(England) Baddeley	15	15
(Australia) Sze Yu	8	8
Third place
(England) Yates	15	15
(Scotland) White	9	10

=== Women's singles ===
Round of 16
1	(England) Helen Troke	11	11
16	(New Zealand) Katrin Lockey	4	1
8	(Canada) Linda Cloutier	11	11
9	(Australia) Tracey Small	2	9
5	(England) Gillian Clark	11	11
12	(Australia) Rhonda Cator	3	4
4	(Canada) Claire Sharpe	11	4	11
13	(Hong Kong) Amy Chan	8	11	8
6	(England) Fiona Elliott	11	11
11	(Canada) Sandra Skillings	0	4
3	(Wales) Lesley Roberts	11	11
14	(Guernsey) Bridget Hunt	2	6
7	(Canada) Denyse Julien	11	11
10	(Scotland) Elinor Allen	3	5
2	(England) Gillian Gowers	11	11
15	(New Zealand) Toni Whittaker	2	8

Quarter-finals
(England) Troke	11	11
(Canada) Cloutier	2	0
(England) Clark	12	11
(Canada) Sharpe	11	6
(England) Elliott	11	11
(Wales) Roberts	2	1
(Canada) Julien	12	11
(England) Gowers	10	6

Semi-finals
(England) Troke	11	11
(England) Clark	8	2
(England) Elliott	11	11
(Canada) Julien	6	0

Final
(England) Troke	11	11
(England) Elliott	4	4
Third place
(England) Clark	11	11
(Canada) Julien	3	3

=== Men's doubles ===
Quarterfinals
(Scotland) Billy Gilliland (Scotland) Dan Travers	15	15
(Canada) Mike Butler (Canada) Ken Poole	3	3
(Australia) Michael Scandolera (Australia) Paul Kong	18	15
(Wales) Lyndon Williams (Wales) Chris Rees	13	12
(England) Andy Goode (England) Nigel Tier	13	15	15
(Australia) Darren McDonald (Australia) Gordon Lang	15	8	10
(New Zealand) Kerrin Harrison (New Zealand) Glenn Stewart	12	15	18
(Canada) Mike De Belle (Canada) Mike Bitten	15	10	13

Semifinals
(Scotland) Gilliland (Scotland) Travers	15	15
(Australia) Scandolera (Australia) Kong	12	11
(England) Goode (England) Tier	15	15
(New Zealand) Harrison (New Zealand) Stewart	9	5

Finals
(Scotland) Gilliland (Scotland) Travers	15	15
(England) Goode (England) Tier	8	5
Third place
(New Zealand) Harrison (New Zealand) Stewart	15	15
(Australia) Scandolera (Australia) Kong	12	11

=== Women's doubles ===
Quarterfinals
(England) Gillian Clark (England) Gillian Gowers	15	15
(Australia) Tracey Small (Australia) Karen Jupp	2	1
(Canada) Claire Sharpe (Canada) Linda Cloutier	15	15
(Northern Ireland) Barbara Beckett (Northern Ireland) Holly Lane	9	1
(Canada) Denyse Julien (Canada) Johanne Falardeau	18	15
(Australia) Rhonda Cator (Australia) Audrey Tuckey	13	11
(England) Helen Troke (England) Fiona Elliott	15	15
(New Zealand) Toni Whittaker (New Zealand) Katrin Lockey	12	5

Semifinals
(England) Clark (England) Gowers	15	15
(Canada) Sharpe (Canada) Cloutier	10	6
(Canada) Julien (Canada) Falardeau	15	15
(England) Troke (England) Elliott	11	2

Finals
(England) Clark (England) Gowers	15	15
(Canada) Julien (Canada) Falardeau	6	7
Third place
(England) Troke (England) Elliott	15	15
(Canada) Sharpe (Canada) Cloutier	8	11

=== Mixed doubles ===
Quarterfinals
(Australia) Michael Scandolera (Australia) Audrey Tuckey	15	17
(England) Nigel Tier (England) Gillian Gowers	7	15
(Canada) Ken Poole (Canada) Linda Cloutier	6	15	15
(England) Richard Outterside (England) Gillian Clark	15	6	7
(England) Andy Goode (England) Fiona Elliott	15	15
(Scotland) Iain Pringle (Scotland) Jenny Allen	10	0
(Scotland) Billy Gilliland (Scotland) Christine Heatly	15	15
(New Zealand) Glenn Stewart (New Zealand) Karen Phillips	5	3

Semifinals
(Australia) Scandolera (Australia) Tuckey	15	12	15
(Canada) Poole (Canada) Cloutier	12	15	2
(England) Goode (England) Elliott	15	18
(Scotland) Gilliland (Scotland) Heatly	14	15

Finals
(Australia) Scandolera (Australia) Tuckey	15	15
(England) Goode (England) Elliott	7	5
Third place
(Scotland) Gilliland (Scotland) Heatly	15	17
(Canada) Poole (Canada) Cloutier	12	14

=== Mixed Team ===
Scotland were denied an almost certain team bronze medal when Alison Fulton was carried off the court during the third match (the wome's doubles, with Scotland leading Australia 2–0 at the time.

Semi-finals

Team One	Team Two	Score
England	Scotland	4-1
Canada	Australia	5-0

Bronze medal Play off

Australia
3

Scotland
2

			1	2	3
1	(Australia) (Scotland)	Karen Jupp; Jenny Allen	9; 12	8; 11
2	(Australia) (Scotland)	Paul Kong / Michael Scandolera; Billy Gilliland / Dan Travers	7; 15	11; 15
3	(Australia) (Scotland)	Tracey Small / Audrey Tuckey; Jenny Allen / Alison Fulton	6; 15	2; 5	wo ret
4	(Australia) (Scotland)	Michael Scandolera / Audrey Tuckey; Billy Gilliland / Christine Heatly	15; 5	15; 5
5	(Australia) (Scotland)	Sze Yu; Alex White	15; 3	15; 9

Final

England
5

Canada
0

			1	2	3
1	(England) (Canada)	Steve Baddeley; Mike Butler	15; 7	15; 7
2	(England) (Canada)	Helen Troke; Claire Sharpe	7; 11	11; 4	11; 7
3	(England) (Canada)	Gillian Clark / Gillian Gowers; Denyse Julien / Johanne Falardeau	15; 5	15; 7
4	(England) (Canada)	Andy Goode / Steve Baddeley; Ken Poole / Mike De Belle	15; 7	15; 6
5	(England) (Canada)	Nigel Tier / Gillian Gowers; Mike Butler / Claire Sharpe	15; 8	15; 11
