= Kirsteen McEwan =

Scottish badminton player

Personal information
- Nationality: British (Scottish)
- Born: 20 November 1975 (age 50) Scotland
- Height: 1.68 m (5 ft 6 in)

Sport
- Sport: Badminton
- Handedness: Right
- Event: Doubles

Doubles
- BWF profile
Medal record
Women's badminton
Representing Scotland
Commonwealth Games
Bronze medal – third place	2002 Manchester	Mixed team

Kirsteen Fiona McEwan-Miller née McEwan (born 20 November 1975) is a retired badminton player from Scotland. She reached a career high as world number 8 and has a number of titles to her name and competed at three Commonwealth Games.

== Biography ==
McEwan represented the Scottish team at the 1998 Commonwealth Games in Kuala Lumpur, Malaysia, where she competed in the badminton events.

McEwan represented the Scottish team again at the 2002 Commonwealth Games in Manchester, England, where he competed in the badminton events, winning a bronze medal as part of the mixed team.

McEwan married in 2004 and played under the name of Kirsteen McEwan-Miller thereafter. As McEwan-Miller she attended a third Commonwealth Games in 2006 in Melbourne, competing in the mixed doubles.

She was five-times doubles champion and seven-times mixed doubles champion at the Scottish National Badminton Championships.

Her mother, Fiona McEwan, was a former Badminton Scotland president, and Commonwealth Games Scotland vice-chair. His brother-in-law, Craig Robertson, also a former Scottish national badminton player.

== Achievements ==
=== IBF World Grand Prix ===
The World Badminton Grand Prix sanctioned by International Badminton Federation (IBF) from 1983 to 2006.

Women's doubles
Year	Tournament	Partner	Opponent	Score	Result
1998	U.S. Open	(Scotland) Elinor Middlemiss	(Canada) Milaine Cloutier (Canada) Robbyn Hermitage	7–15, 15–5, 15–2	(gold) Winner

=== IBF International ===
Women's doubles
Year	Tournament	Partner	Opponent	Score	Result
2002	Iceland International	(Scotland) Yuan Wemyss	(Iceland) Katrin Atladóttir (Iceland) Drifa Hardardóttir	11–3, 11–4	(gold) Winner
2002	Scottish International	(Scotland) Yuan Wemyss	(Germany) Nicole Grether (Germany) Juliane Schenk	Walkover	(gold) Winner
2002	Slovak International	(Scotland) Yuan Wemyss	(Russia) Natalia Gorodnicheva (Russia) Elena Sukhareva	11–5, 11–5	(gold) Winner
2001	Scottish International	(Scotland) Susan Hughes	(Scotland) Sandra Watt (Scotland) Yuan Wemyss	4–7, 0–7, 8–6, 0–7	(silver) Runner-up
1999	Austrian International	(Scotland) Sandra Watt	(Netherlands) Ginny Severien (Netherlands) Melissa Trouerbach	15–9, 15–10	(gold) Winner
1999	La Chaux-de-Fonds International	(Scotland) Sandra Watt	(Netherlands) Lonneke Janssen (Netherlands) Erica van den Heuvel	10–15, 6–15	(silver) Runner-up
1997	Mauritius International	(England) Wendy Taylor	(South Africa) Meagen Burnett (South Africa) Michelle Edwards	15–5, 15–10	(gold) Winner

Mixed doubles
Year	Tournament	Partner	Opponent	Score	Result
2005	Irish International	(Scotland) Andrew Bowman	(Germany) Roman Spitko (Germany) Carina Mette	15–10, 7–15, 0–15	(silver) Runner-up
2005	Spanish International	(Scotland) Andrew Bowman	(France) Jean-Michel Lefort (Russia) Ella Karachkova	3–15, 9–15	(silver) Runner-up
2002	Spanish International	(Scotland) Graeme Smith	(Spain) José Antonio Crespo (Spain) Dolores Marco	7–2, 7–8, 8–6, 2–7, 7–1	(gold) Winner
2002	Croatian International	(Scotland) Russell Hogg	(Australia) Travis Denney (Australia) Kate Wilson-Smith	7–3, 8–6, 7–2	(gold) Winner
2001	Slovenian International	(Scotland) Russell Hogg	(Russia) Nikolai Zuyev (Russia) Marina Yakusheva	5–7, 3–7, 2–7	(silver) Runner-up
2000	Irish International	(Scotland) Russell Hogg	(England) Graham Hurrell (England) Sara Hardaker	15–9, 15–8	(gold) Winner
2000	Le Volant d'Or de Toulouse	(Scotland) Russell Hogg	(Germany) Björn Siegemund (Germany) Nicol Pitro	5–15, 11–15	(silver) Runner-up
2000	Slovenian International	(Scotland) Russell Hogg	(Denmark) Mathias Boe (Denmark) Britta Andersen	9–15, 3–15	(silver) Runner-up
1999	Austrian International	(Scotland) Kenny Middlemiss	(Slovenia) Andrej Pohar (Slovenia) Maja Pohar	15–12, 15–11	(gold) Winner
1997	Mauritius International	(England) Peter Jeffrey	(England) Graham Hurrell (England) Wendy Taylor	15–6, 15–5	(gold) Winner
