= Badminton at the 1978 Commonwealth Games =

- Venue: University of Alberta Arena
- Location: Edmonton, Alberta, Canada
- Dates: 3 – 12 August 1978

The badminton competition at the 1978 Commonwealth Games took place in Edmonton, Alberta, Canada, from 3 August until 12 August 1978.

== Medal table ==
* Host nation (Canada)

Rank	Nation	Gold	Silver	Bronze	Total
1	England	4	1	2	7
2	Malaysia	1	2	1	4
3	India	1	0	1	2
4	Canada*	0	2	1	3
5	Scotland	0	1	0	1
6	New Zealand	0	0	1	1
Totals (6 entries)		6	6	6	18

== Medallists ==
Event	Gold	Silver	Bronze
Mixed Team	England; England; Anne Statt; Barbara Sutton; David Eddy; Derek Talbot; Jane Webster; Karen Bridge; Kevin Jolly; Mike Tredgett; Nora Perry; Raymond Stevens	Canada; Canada; Claire Backhouse; Gregory Carter; Jamie McKee; Jane Youngberg; Johanne Falardeau; John Czich; Kenneth Priestman; Lucio Fabris; Sharon Crawford; Wendy Clarkson	Malaysia; Malaysia; Abu Bakar Sufian; Chee Geok Whee; Moo Foot Lian; James Selvaraj; Katherine Swee Phek Teh; Saw Swee Leong; Sylvia Ng; Ong Teong Boon
Men's Singles	Prakash Padukone; India	Derek Talbot; England	Ray Stevens; England
Men's Doubles	Ray Stevens; Mike Tredgett; England	Moo Foot Lian; Ong Beng Teong; Malaysia	Bryan Purser; Richard Purser; New Zealand
Women's Singles	Sylvia Ng; Malaysia	Katherine Swee Phek Teh; Malaysia	Wendy Clarkson; Canada
Women's Doubles	Nora Perry; Anne Statt; England	Claire Backhouse; Jane Youngberg; Canada	Ami Ghia; Kanwal Thakar Singh; India
Mixed Doubles	Mike Tredgett; Nora Perry; England	Billy Gilliland; Joanna Flockhart; Scotland	Derek Talbot; Barbara Sutton; England

== Final results ==
Category	Winners	Runners-up	Score
Men's singles	(India) Prakash Padukone	(England) Derek Talbot	15–9, 15–8
Women's singles	(Malaysia) Sylvia Ng	(Malaysia) Katherine Swee Phek Teh	11–5, 11–3
Men's doubles	(England) Ray Stevens & Mike Tredgett	(Malaysia) Moo Foot Lian & Ong Teong Boon	15-10, 15–5
Women's doubles	(England) Nora Perry & Anne Statt	(Canada) Claire Backhouse & Jane Youngberg	10-15, 15–2, 15–12
Mixed doubles	(England) Mike Tredgett & Nora Perry	(Scotland) Billy Gilliland & Joanna Flockhart	15-7, 15-7
Mixed team	England	Canada	4-1

== Results ==
=== Men's singles ===
Round of 16
1	(India) Prakash Padukone	15	15
16	(Malaysia) Moo Foot Lian	3	6
8	(New Zealand) Richard Purser	15	15
9	(Canada) Keith Priestman	13	4
5	(England) Ray Stevens	15	18
12	(Canada) Lucio Fabris	5	14
4	(India) Syed Modi	15	15
13	(Malaysia) James Selvaraj	7	9
6	(England) Derek Talbot	15	15
11	(Northern Ireland) Bill Thompson	5	2
3	(India) Partho Ganguli	15	15
14	(Malaysia) Abu Bakar Sufian	6	10
7	(Malaysia) Saw Swee Leong	17	15
10	(India) Uday Pawar	16	6
2	(New Zealand) Ross Livingston	18	15
15	(England) Kevin Jolly	16	11

Quarter-finals
(India) Padukone	15	15
(New Zealand) Purser	1	8
(England) Stevens	15	15
(India) Modi	5	12
(England) Talbot	18	3	15
(India) Ganguli	13	15	10
(Malaysia) Leong	15	15
(New Zealand) Livingston	7	2

Semi-finals
(India) Padukone	15	15
(England) Stevens	0	7
(England) Talbot	15	13	15
(Malaysia) Leong	5	15	8

Final
(India) Padukone	15	15
(England) Talbot	9	8
Third place
(England) Stevens	15	15
(Malaysia) Leong	4	11

=== Women's singles ===
Round of 16
1	(Malaysia) Sylvia Ng	11	11
16	(Australia) Audrey Swaby	2	4
8	(England) Nora Perry	11	11
9	(Canada) Johanne Falardeau	1	6
5	(England) Jane Webster	11	11
12	(Australia) Susan Daly	7	8
4	(Canada) Jane Youngberg	12	11
13	(India) Kanwal Thakur Singh	10	5
6	(Malaysia) Katherine Swee Phek Teh	11	1	11
11	(Scotland) Pamela Hamilton	1	11	2
3	(England) Karen Bridge	11	11
14	(New Zealand) Alison Branfield	3	3
7	(Canada) Wendy Clarkson	11	11
10	(Scotland) Anne Johnstone	2	3
2	(Northern Ireland) Barbara Beckett	11	11
15	(New Zealand) Mary Livingston	7	6

Quarter-finals
(Malaysia) Ng	11	11
(England) Perry	0	8
(England) Webster	11	11
(Canada) Youngberg	9	3
(Malaysia) Phek Teh	11	11
(England) Bridge	6	8
(Canada) Clarkson	11	11
(Northern Ireland) Beckett	5	1

Semi-finals
(Malaysia) Ng	11	11
(England) Webster	8	2
(Malaysia) Phek Teh	11	9	11
(Canada) Clarkson	7	12	9

Final
(Malaysia) Ng	11	11
(Malaysia) Phek Teh	5	3
Third place
(Canada) Clarkson	11	11
(England) Webster	1	3

=== Men's doubles ===
Quarterfinals
(England) Ray Stevens (England) Mike Tredgett	15	15
(Australia) Peter Cooper (Australia) Paul Kong	7	6
(New Zealand) Bryan Purser (New Zealand) Richard Purser	15	15
(Malaysia) Abu Bakar Sufian (Malaysia) James Selvaraj	9	8
(Malaysia) Moo Foot Lian (Malaysia) Ong Teong Boon	17	12	15
(India) Prakash Padukone (India) Uday Pawar	16	15	8
(England) Derek Talbot (England) Kevin Jolly	15	5	15
(Canada) Keith Priestman (Canada) Greg Carter	9	15	12

Semifinals
(England) Stevens (England) Tredgett	15	15
(New Zealand) Purser (New Zealand) Purser	5	8
(Malaysia) Lian (Malaysia) Teong	15	11	15
(England) Talbot (England) Jolly	5	15	2

Finals
(England) Stevens (England) Tredgett	15	15
(Malaysia) Lian (Malaysia) Teong	10	5
Third place
(New Zealand) Purser (New Zealand) Purser	15	11	15
(England) Talbot (England) Jolly	10	15	1

=== Women's doubles ===
Quarterfinals
(England) Nora Perry (England) Anne Statt	15	15
(Scotland) Anne Johnstone (Scotland) Pamela Hamilton	2	9
(India) Ami Ghia (India) Kanwal Thakur Singh	15	13	15
(Malaysia) Sylvia Ng (Malaysia) Katherine Swee Phek Teh	6	18	8
(Canada) Claire Backhouse (Canada) Jane Youngberg	17	15
(Northern Ireland) Barbara Beckett (Northern Ireland) Dorothy Cunningham	14	10
(England) Barbara Sutton (England) Jane Webster	15	15
(Scotland) Christine Stewart (Scotland) Joanna Flockhart	8	3

Semifinals
(England) Perry (England) Statt	15	15
(India) Ghia (India) Singh	5	4
(Canada) Backhouse (Canada) Youngberg	15	17
(England) Sutton (England) Webster	7	16

Finals
(England) Perry (England) Statt	10	15	15
(Canada) Backhouse (Canada) Youngberg	15	5	12
Third place
(India) Ghia (India) Singh	15	9	15
(England) Sutton (England) Webster	7	15	5

=== Mixed doubles ===
Quarterfinals
(England) Mike Tredgett (England) Nora Perry	17	15
(Scotland) Fraser Gow (Scotland) Christine Stewart	15	11
(New Zealand) Richard Purser (New Zealand) Alison Branfield	15	15
(Canada) Greg Carter (Canada) Wendy Clarkson	7	12
(Scotland) Billy Gilliland (Scotland) Joanna Flockhart	15	15
(England) Kevin Jolly (England) Karen Bridge	10	4
(England) Derek Talbot (England) Barbara Sutton	15	17
(Australia) Peter Cooper (Australia) Joan Jones	13	16

Semifinals
(England) Tredgett (England) Perry	15	15
(New Zealand) Purser (New Zealand) Branfield	5	2
(Scotland) Gilliland (Scotland) Flockhart	15	15
(England) Talbot (England) Sutton	4	5

Finals
(England) Tredgett (England) Perry	15	15
(Scotland) Gilliland (Scotland) Flockhart	7	7
Third place
(England) Talbot (England) Sutton	15	15
(New Zealand) Purser (New Zealand) Branfield	9	9

=== Mixed Team ===
Semi-finals

Team One	Team Two	Score
England	Malaysia	4-1
Canada	New Zealand	4-1

Bronze medal Play off

Malaysia
4

New Zealand
1

			1	2	3
1	(Malaysia) (New Zealand)	Sylvia Ng; Mary Livingston	11; 0	11; 1
2	(Malaysia) (New Zealand)	Moo Foot Lian / James Selvaraj; Steve Wilson / Ross Livingston	12; 15	15; 6	15; 11
3	(Malaysia) (New Zealand)	Sylvia Ng / Katherine Swee Phek Teh; Alison Branfield / Allison Sinton	4; 15	15; 13	15; 6
4	(Malaysia) (New Zealand)	Saw Swee Leong; Bryan Purser	w/o scr
5	(Malaysia) (New Zealand)	James Selvaraj / Katherine Swee Phek Teh; Richard Purser / Alison Branfield	15; 4	15; 5

Final

England
4

Canada
1

			1	2	3
1	(England) (Canada)	Mike Tredgett / Ray Stevens; Greg Carter / Keith Priestman	15; 3	15; 3
2	(England) (Canada)	Nora Perry / Anne Statt; Jane Youngberg / Claire Backhouse	15; 9	17; 14
3	(England) (Canada)	Jane Webster; Wendy Clarkson	11; 2	7; 11	3; 11
4	(England) (Canada)	Derek Talbot; John Czich	12; 15	15; 5	15; 11
5	(England) (Canada)	Mike Tredgett / Nora Perry; Lucio Fabris / Johanne Falardeau	15; 3	15; 6
