= Fiona Sneddon =

Scottish international badminton player

Personal information
- Nationality: British (Scottish)
- Born: 7 August 1981

Sport
- Sport: Badminton
- Club: Lochgelly
Medal record
Representing Scotland
Commonwealth Games
Bronze medal – third place	2002 Manchester	Mixed team
European Junior Championships
Bronze medal – third place	1999 Glasgow	Girls' doubles

Fiona Sneddon (born 7 August 1981) is a former international badminton player from Scotland who competed at two Commonwealth Games.

== Biography ==
Sneddon was born in 1981 and was from Lochgelly in Fife.

She attended Lochgelly High School and was coached by Bruce Flockhart. She was the youngest Scottish player to appear in the Uber Cup. Sneddon was based in Lochgelly and represented Scotland at international level.

Sneddon had just turned 17, when she represented the Scottish team at the 1998 Commonwealth Games in Kuala Lumpur, Malaysia, where she competed in the badminton events.

In October 1998 she became the first Scottish player to win the Danish Junior Open singles. Sneddon represented the Scottish team again at the 2002 Commonwealth Games in Manchester, England, where she competed in the badminton events, winning a bronze medal as part of the mixed team.

She was twice singles champion at the Scottish National Badminton Championships in 2000 and 2003.
