= Nicol McCloy =

Scottish international badminton player

Personal information
- Nationality: British (Scottish)
- Born: 1944 Greenock, Scotland
- Died: 1 December 2018 (aged 74) Greenock, Scotland

Sport
- Sport: Badminton
- Club: Greenock BC
Medal record
Representing Scotland
Scottish Nationals
Gold medal – first place	1974–1977	singles

Nicol Hugh McCloy (1944 – 1 December 2018) was an international badminton player from Scotland who competed at the Commonwealth Games.

== Biography ==
McCloy played his badminton in Greenock and in 1966, shortly after the 1966 British Empire and Commonwealth Games, he was listed as a possible for the 1970 British Commonwealth Games.

He contested the 1969 East of Scotland final losing out to Adam Flockhart and in November 1969 he was selected for the Scottish Commonwealth Games trials but missed the Games with a serious achilles tendon injury.

McCloy represented the Scottish team at the 1974 British Commonwealth Games in Christchurch, New Zealand, where he competed in the badminton events. In 1974 he retained his South of Scotland title

He was the four-times singles champion at the Scottish National Badminton Championships from 1974 to 1977 and earned 35 international caps.

McCloy worked at the Scott Lithgow shipyard during his working life. He died on 1 December 2018 in Inverclyde Royal Hospital.
