= Wilma Reid =

Scottish badminton player

Wilma Reid née Tyre
Personal information
- Nationality: British (Scottish)
- Born: c.1936 Scotland
- Died: 6 June 2018

Sport
- Sport: Badminton
- Event(s): singles, doubles

Wilma Reid (née Tyre) (c.1936 – 6 June 2018) was a badminton player from Scotland.

== Biography ==
Born Wilma Tyre, she was a five-times Scottish National singles champion from 1955 to 1961. Additionally, she won nine doubles titles and ten mixed doubles titles, for a grand total of 24 national titles. Tyre also won six Scottish Open titles.

Tyre learned to play badminton in her father's barn on the family dairy farm near Kilmarnock and was one of three sisters (E.S. Tyre and B. Tyre) to play at county level during the early 1950s. In 1954, Tyre first came to prominence representing Kilmarnock and winning the Scottish junior national championships in singles and doubles, defeating one of her sisters in singles final and pairing up with her in the doubles. She became an established international for Scotland and was ranked number one in Scotland.

She formed a significant partnership with Bob McCoig in the mixed doubles format and in the women's doubles won many of her title with Cathie Dunglison and Muriel Ferguson.

Tyre married Alexander Reid in 1962 and played under her married name of Reid thereafter.
