= Ian Hume (badminton) =

Scottish international badminton player

Personal information
- Nationality: British (Scottish)
- Born: c.1945

Sport
- Sport: Badminton
- Club: Glasgow BC
Medal record
Representing Scotland
Scottish Nationals
Gold medal – first place	1969	men's doubles
Gold medal – first place	1972	mixed doubles
Irish Open
Gold medal – first place	1968	men's doubles

Ian Hume (born c.1945) is a former international badminton player from Scotland who competed at the Commonwealth Games.

== Biography ==
Hume played his badminton out of Glasgow and was a Scottish international.

Hume represented the Scottish team at the 1970 British Commonwealth Games in Edinburgh, Scotland, where he competed in the men's doubles events.

He was twice champion at the Scottish National Badminton Championships in the men's doubles in 1969 and mixed doubles in 1972. Additionally, he won the doubles at the 1968 Irish Open.

Hume lived with fellow international player Maureen Hume, formerly Ross, at 51 Busby Road in Clarkston, East Renfrewshire. Maureen took his surname and played under the name Hume. On 21 October 1971 she was killed in the Clarkston explosion.
