= Jenny Allen =

Scottish international badminton player

Personal information
- Nationality: British (Scottish)
- Born: c.1965 Aberdeen, Scotland

Sport
- Sport: Badminton
- Club: Edinburgh
Medal record
Representing Scotland
Scottish Nationals
Gold medal – first place	1985–86	singles
Gold medal – first place	1986–88, 91–95	doubles
Irish Open
Gold medal – first place	1989	doubles

Jennifer Allen (born c.1965) married name Jennifer Williamson is a former international badminton player from Scotland who competed at three Commonwealth Games.

== Biography ==
Allen was born in Aberdeen to a sporting family, her mother Gladys Massie was an international badminton player. Her sister Elinor Allen was also a Scottish international player.

Allen was based in Edinburgh, and with her sister, she won the doubles and the Chapman Trophy at the 1985 Lanarkshire Open Championships.

In 1986 she represented her nation at the European Championships and represented the Scottish team at the 1986 Commonwealth Games in Edinburgh, Scotland, where she competed in the doubles and team events. She was denied an almost certain mixed team bronze medal, when her doubles partner Alison Fulton was carried off the court during the third match, with Scotland leading Australia 2–0 at the time.

At her second Commonwealth Games in 1990 she once again partnered her sister but in 1992, she teamed up with a new doubles partner in Jillian Haldane. However, by her third Commonwealth Games appearance in 1994 she was back with her sister.

Allen married in April 1995 and changed her name to Jenny Williamson but retired shortly afterwards.

Allen was the twice singles champion and eight times women's doubles champion at the Scottish National Badminton Championships. Additionally, she was the 1989 doubles champion at the Irish Open.
