= Mac Henderson (badminton) =

Scottish badminton player (born 1935)

Personal information
- Nationality: British (Scottish)
- Born: 24 August 1935 (age 90) Golspie, Scotland

Sport
- Sport: Badminton
- Events: singles, doubles
- Club: Glasgow

MacDonald Henderson (born 24 August 1935) is a Scottish former badminton player who competed at the Commonwealth Games.

== Biography ==
Henderson originally played his badminton in Dunfermline and was primarily a Scottish international doubles player. He was able to compete with the world's best in the doubles format and made his international debut against Sweden in 1958.

He won four Scottish National titles, spanning a 12-year period from 1959 to 1970. It consisted of one men's doubles and three mixed doubles crowns. He also won two Scottish Open titles in 1963 and 1967 respectively.

Henderson represented the Scotland team at the 1966 British Empire and Commonwealth Games in Kingston, Jamaica, in the two events; partnering Bob McCoig in the men's doubles and Cathie Dunglison in the mixed doubles.

He was appointed badminton team manager for the 1970 British Commonwealth Games in Edinburgh.
