= Sandra Watt =

Scottish international badminton player

Personal information
- Nationality: British (Scottish)
- Born: 8 August 1973

Sport
- Sport: Badminton
- Club: Innerleithen
Medal record
Representing Scotland
Commonwealth Games
Bronze medal – third place	1998 Kuala Lumpur	Women's doubles
Bronze medal – third place	2002 Manchester	Mixed team
Scottish Nationals
Gold medal – first place	1998–2002, 2005	doubles
Scottish Open
Gold medal – first place	2001	doubles

Sandra Watt (born 8 August 1973) is a former international badminton player from Scotland who competed at two Commonwealth Games and won two bronze medals.

== Biography ==
Watt born in 1973 was from Innerleithen and based in Edinburgh. She represented Scotland at international level.

Watt represented the Scottish team at the 1998 Commonwealth Games in Kuala Lumpur, Malaysia, where she competed in the badminton events. Partnering Elinor Middlemiss, she won a bronze medal in the women's doubles.

She broke her wrist during the 1998 Games and did not return until January 1999. Later, she partnered with Kirsteen McEwan and then Yuan Wemyss in the women's doubles.

Watt represented the Scottish team again at the 2002 Commonwealth Games in Manchester, England, where she competed in the badminton events, winning a bronze medal as part of the mixed team.

She was a six-times doubles champion at the Scottish National Badminton Championships.
