= Badminton at the 1970 British Commonwealth Games =

- Venue: Meadowbank Sports Centre
- Location: Edinburgh, Scotland
- Dates: 16–21 July 1970

The badminton competition at the 1970 British Commonwealth Games was the second appearance of Badminton at the Commonwealth Games and took place in Edinburgh, Scotland, from 16 July until 21 July 1970.

The events took place in one of the three sports halls forming part of the Meadowbank Sports Centre, which was built specifically for the Games, at a cost of £2.8 million.

Sixteen countries participated but only three claimed medals, with England topping the medal table with three golds.

== Medal table ==
* Host nation (Scotland)

Medals won by nation with totals, ranked by number of golds—sortable
Rank	Nation	Gold	Silver	Bronze	Total
1	England	3	4	3	10
2	Malaysia	1	1	1	3
3	Canada	1	0	1	2
Totals (3 entries)		5	5	5	15

== Medallists ==
Medal winners
Event	Gold	Silver	Bronze
Men's Singles	Jamie Paulson (CAN)	Paul Whetnall (ENG)	Ray Sharp (ENG)
Men's Doubles	Ng Boon Bee; Punch Gunalan (MAS)	Ng Tat Wai; Tan Soon Hooi (MAS)	Yves Paré; Jamie Paulson (CAN)
Women's Singles	Margaret Beck (ENG)	Gillian Perrin (ENG)	Margaret Boxall (ENG)
Women's Doubles	Margaret Boxall; Sue Whetnall (ENG)	Gillian Perrin; Julie Rickard (ENG)	Rosalind Singha Ang; Teoh Siew Yong (MAS)
Mixed Doubles	Derek Talbot; Margaret Boxall (ENG)	Roger Mills; Gillian Perrin (ENG)	David Eddy; Sue Whetnall (ENG)

== Finals ==
Final result
Category	Winners	Runners-up	Score
Men's singles	(Canada) Jamie Paulson	(England) Paul Whetnall	10–15, 15–13, 15–10
Women's singles	(England) Margaret Beck	(England) Gillian Perrin	5–11, 11–3, 11–8
Men's doubles	(Malaysia) Ng Boon Bee & Punch Gunalan	(Malaysia) Ng Tat Wai & Tan Soon Hooi	15–3, 15–3
Women's doubles	(England) Margaret Boxall & Sue Whetnall	(England) Gillian Perrin & Julie Rickard	15–9, 15–2
Mixed doubles	(England) Derek Talbot & Margaret Boxall	(England) Roger Mills & Gillian Perrin	8–15, 15–12, 15–12

== Results ==
=== Men's singles ===
Round of 16
1	(Canada) Jamie Paulson	15	18
16	(England) Derek Talbot	8	17
8	(New Zealand) Richard Purser	15	18
9	(India) Satish Bhatia	7	14
5	(England) Ray Sharp	15	15
12	(India) Raman Ghosh	6	3
4	(Malaysia) Abdul Rahman Mohamed	15	15
13	(Scotland) Adam Flockhart	8	3
6	(England) Paul Whetnall	15	15
11	(Canada) Dave Charron	3	7
3	(Malaysia) Punch Gunalan	15	15
14	(Scotland) Jim McNeillage	3	3
7	(India) Suresh Goel	15	15
10	(Singapore) Wee Kin	3	10
2	(Canada) Bruce Rollick	15	15
15	(Australia) Ross Livingston	12	7

Quarter-finals
(Canada) Paulson	15	15
(New Zealand) Purser	9	8
(England) Sharp	15	15
(Malaysia) Rahman	6	7
(England) Whetnall	17	15
(Malaysia) Gunalan	15	2
(India) Goel	16	15	15
(Canada) Rollick	18	3	12

Semi-finals
(Canada) Paulson	17	15
(England) Sharp	14	5
(England) Whetnall	15	15
(India) Goel	12	5

Final
(Canada) Paulson	10	15	15
(England) Whetnall	15	13	10
Third place
(England) Sharp	15	15
(India) Goel	9	12

=== Women's singles ===
Round of 16
1	(England) Margaret Beck	11	11
16	(Canada) Judy Rollick	8	4
8	(Australia) Judith Nyirati	11	11
9	(Scotland) Joanna Flockhart	0	3
5	(England) Margaret Boxall	11	11
12	(Scotland) Helen Kelly	5	2
4	(Malaysia) Teoh Siew Yong	10	11	11
13	(Canada) Patricia Moody	12	5	4
6	(England) Gillian Perrin	11	11
11	(Jamaica) Christine Bennett	1	1
3	(Malaysia) Rosalind Singha Ang	11	11
14	(Scotland) Maureen Hume	3	3
7	(Malaysia) Sylvia Ng Meow Eng
10	(Australia) Kay Marie Nesbit
2	(Canada) Alison Ridgway	11	11
15	(Scotland) Mary Thompson	5	6

Quarter-finals
(England) Beck	11	12
(Australia) Nyirati	8	11
(England) Boxall	11	11
(Malaysia) Siew Yong	2	3
(England) Perrin	11	11
(Malaysia) Ang	4	4
(Malaysia) Ng	11	11
(Canada) Ridgway	4	2

Semi-finals
(England) Beck	11	12
(England) Boxall	6	9
(England) Perrin	10	11	11
(Malaysia) Ng	12	5	2

Final
(England) Beck	5	11	11
(England) Perrin	11	3	8
Third place
(England) Boxall	11	11
(Malaysia) Ng	6	8

=== Men's doubles ===
Quarterfinals
(Malaysia) Ng Boon Bee (Malaysia) Punch Gunalan	15	15
(Northern Ireland) Winston Wilkinson (Northern Ireland) Sammy Blair	2	6
(Canada) Yves Paré (Canada) Jamie Paulson	18	15
(India) Dipu Ghosh (India) Raman Ghosh	14	3
(Malaysia) Ng Tat Wai (Malaysia) Tan Soon Hooi	15	9	17
(India) Suresh Goel (India) Satish Bhatia	1	15	16
(England) David Eddy (England) Derek Talbot	12	15	15
(Canada) Dave Charron (Canada) Rolf Paterson	15	11	5

Semifinals
(Malaysia) Boon Bee (Malaysia) Gunalan	15	15
(Canada) Paré (Canada) Paulson	11	8
(Malaysia) Tat Wai (Malaysia) Soon Hooi	15	15
(England) Eddy (England) Talbot	11	3

Finals
(Malaysia) Boon Bee (Malaysia) Gunalan	15	15
(Malaysia) Tat Wai (Malaysia) Soon Hooi	3	3
Third place
(Canada) Paré (Canada) Paulson	15	15
(England) Eddy (England) Talbot	10	12

=== Women's doubles ===
Quarterfinals
(England) Margaret Boxall (England) Sue Whetnall	15	15
(Scotland) Joanna Flockhart (Scotland) Helen Kelly	6	9
(Malaysia) Sylvia Tan (Malaysia) Sylvia Ng Meow Eng	15	15
(Canada) Alison Ridgway (Canada) Judy Rollick	10	12
(England) Gillian Perrin (England) Julie Rickard	15	15
(Canada) Patricia Moody (Canada) Nancy McKinley	3	7
(Malaysia) Rosalind Singha Ang (Malaysia) Teoh Siew Yong	15	15
(Northern Ireland) Maureen Mockford (Northern Ireland) Joan McCloy	2	4

Semifinals
(England) Boxall (England) Whetnall	15	15
(Malaysia) Tan (Malaysia) Ng	4	11
(England) Perrin (England) Rickard	15	15
(Malaysia) Ang (Malaysia) Siew Yong	2	10

Finals
(England) Boxall (England) Whetnall	15	15
(England) Perrin (England) Rickard	9	2
Third place
(Malaysia) Ang (Malaysia) Siew Yong	15	12	15
(Malaysia) Tan (Malaysia) Ng	2	15	10

=== Mixed doubles ===
Quarterfinals
(England) Derek Talbot (England) Margaret Boxall	15	15
(Scotland) Jim McNeillage (Scotland) Maureen Hume	6	5
(England) David Eddy (England) Sue Whetnall	15	17
(Canada) Dave Charron (Canada) Nancy McKinley	9	14
(England) Roger Mills (England) Gillian Perrin	15	15
(Scotland) Bob McCoig (Scotland) Helen Kelly	10	4
(England) Paul Whetnall (England) Julie Rickard	15	18
(Scotland) Fraser Gow (Scotland) Christine Evans	9	17

Semifinals
(England) Talbot (England) Boxall	17	15	17
(England) Eddy (England) Whetnall	18	6	14
(England) Mills (England) Perrin	15	15
(England) Whetnall (England) Rickard	4	11

Finals
(England) Talbot (England) Boxall	8	15	15
(England) Mills (England) Perrin	15	12	12
Third place
(England) Eddy (England) Whetnall	15	12	15
(England) Whetnall (England) Rickard	8	15	12
