= Badminton at the 1966 British Empire and Commonwealth Games =

- Venue: Convention Hall, National Arena
- Location: Kingston, Jamaica, Jamaica
- Dates: 4 to 13 August 1966

Badminton at the 1966 British Empire and Commonwealth Games was the inaugural appearance for Badminton at the Commonwealth Games.

Badminton and shooting were added to the Games because two sports; lawn bowls and rowing were dropped due to lack of facilities.

The badminton events took place at the Convention Hall in the National Arena, in Kingston, Jamaica, from 4 to 9 August 1966.

England topped the badminton medal table by virtue of winning three gold medals.

== Medal table ==
* Host nation (Jamaica)

Medals won by nation with totals, ranked by number of golds—sortable
Rank	Nation	Gold	Silver	Bronze	Total
1	England	3	2	2	7
2	Malaysia	2	2	1	5
3	Canada	0	1	0	1
4	India	0	0	1	1
4	Scotland	0	0	1	1
Totals (5 entries)		5	5	5	15

== Medal winners ==
Medallists by event
Event	Gold	Silver	Bronze
Men's singles	Tan Aik Huang (Malaysia)	Yew Cheng Hoe (Malaysia)	Dinesh Khanna (India)
Men's doubles	Tan Aik Huang & Yew Cheng Hoe (Malaysia)	Ng Boon Bee & Tan Yee Khan (Malaysia)	David Horton & Roger Mills (England)
Women's singles	Angela Bairstow (England)	Sharon Whittaker (Canada)	Ursula Smith (England)
Women's doubles	Jenny Horton & Ursula Smith (England)	Angela Bairstow & Iris Rogers (England)	Rosalind Singha Ang & Teoh Siew Yong (Malaysia)
Mixed doubles	Roger Mills & Angela Bairstow (England)	Tony Jordan & Jenny Horton (England)	Bob McCoig & Muriel Ferguson (Scotland)

== Final results ==
Results of final matches

Category	Winner	Runner-up	Score
Men's singles	(Malaysia) Tan Aik Huang	(Malaysia) Yew Cheng Hoe	15–8, 15–8
Women's singles	(England) Angela Bairstow	(Canada) Sharon Whittaker	11–5, 11–3
Men's doubles	(Malaysia) Tan Aik Huang & Yew Cheng Hoe	(Malaysia) Ng Boon Bee & Tan Yee Khan	15–14, 15–5
Women's doubles	(England) Jenny Horton & Ursula Smith	(England) Angela Bairstow & Iris Rogers	15–7, 15–7
Mixed doubles	(England) Roger Mills & Angela Bairstow	(England) Tony Jordan & Jenny Horton	7-15, 15–8, 15–12

== Results ==
=== Men's singles ===
Round of 16				Quarter-finals			Semi-finals			Final
1	(Malaysia) Tan Aik Huang	15	15
16	(India) Nandu Natekar	5	10	(Malaysia) Huang	15	15
8	(Canada) Wayne Macdonnell	15	15	(Canada) Macdonnell	10	6
9	(Singapore) Yeo Ah Seng	9	12				(Malaysia) Huang	15	15
5	(Scotland) Bob McCoig	15	15				(Scotland) McCoig	10	7
12	(Australia) George Robotham	4	9	(Scotland) McCoig	15	15
4	(Malaysia) Tan Yee Khan	15	15	(Malaysia) Khan	7	13
13	(England) Colin Beacom	7	4							(Malaysia) Huang	15	15
6	(Malaysia) Yew Cheng Hoe	15	15							(Malaysia) Hoe	8	8
11	(Canada) Yves Paré	10	8	(Malaysia) Hoe	15	15
3	(India) Suresh Goel	15	15	(India) Goel	6	10
14	(Wales) Howard Jennings	3	2				(Malaysia) Hoe	15	15	Bronze medal match
7	(India) Dinesh Khanna	15	15				(India) Khanna	6	12
10	(Canada) Edward Paterson	10	4	(India) Khanna	15	15				(Scotland) McCoig	8	7
2	(England) Roger Mills	15	15	(England) Mills	3	11				(India) Khanna	15	15
15	(Wales) Peter Seaman	6	1

=== Women's singles ===
Round of 16
1	(England) Angela Bairstow	11	11
16	(Jamaica) Sheila Phillips	0	0
8	(Canada) Patricia Espley	3	11	12
9	(New Zealand) Alison Glenie	11	8	10
5	(England) Ursula Smith	11	11
12	(Scotland) Muriel Ferguson	1	7
4	(Canada) Alison Daysmith	4	11	12
13	(Malaysia) Rosalind Singha Ang	11	7	9
6	(Canada) Sharon Whittaker	11	11
11	(England) Iris Rogers	6	2
3	(Jamaica) Christine Bennett	w/o
14	(The Bahamas) D Ball	scr
7	(England) Jenny Horton	11	12
10	(Canada) Judy Humber	5	10
2	(Malaysia) Teoh Siew Yong	11	11
15	(Australia) Joy Nancy Twining	4	4

Quarter-finals
(England) Bairstow	11	11
(Canada) Epsley	6	2
(England) Smith	11	11
(Canada) Daysmith	1	5
(Canada) Whittaker	15	15
(Jamaica) Bennett	0	3
(England) Horton	11	11
(Malaysia) Siew Yong	5	5

Semi-finals
(England) Bairstow	11	11
(England) Smith	7	3
(Canada) Whittaker	4	11	11
(England) Horton	11	4	7

Final
(England) Bairstow	11	11
(Canada) Whittaker	5	3
Third place
(England) Smith	11	11
(England) Horton	8	1

=== Men's doubles ===
Quarterfinals
(Malaysia) Ng Boon Bee (Malaysia) Tan Yee Khan	15	15
(Wales) Howard Jennings (Wales) Peter Seaman	10	11
(England) Roger Mills (England) David Horton	15	16	15
(Singapore) Omar Ibrahim (Singapore) Ah Seng Yeo	5	17	5
(Malaysia) Tan Aik Huang (Malaysia) Yew Cheng Hoe	15	15
(New Zealand) Donald Higgins (New Zealand) Richard Purser	7	7
(England) Tony Jordan (England) Colin Beacom	15	1	15
(Scotland) Mac Henderson (Scotland) Bob McCoig	10	15	11

Semifinals
(Malaysia) Boon Bee (Malaysia) Yee Khan	15	15
(England) Mills (England) Horton	11	9
(Malaysia) Huang (Malaysia) Hoe	15	15
(England) Jordan (England) Beacom	2	11

Finals
(Malaysia) Boon Bee (Malaysia) Yee Khan	8	5
(Malaysia) Huang (Malaysia) Hoe	15	15
Third place
(England) Mills (England) Horton	15	12	18
(England) Jordan (England) Beacom	9	15	17

=== Women's doubles ===
Quarterfinals
(England) Jenny Horton (England) Ursula Smith	15	15
(Jamaica) Pauline Lamon (Jamaica) Christine Bennett	0	0
(Malaysia) Teoh Siew Yong (Malaysia) Rosalind Singha Ang	15	15
(Scotland) Cathie Dunglison (Scotland) Muriel Ferguson	12	1
(England) Angela Bairstow (England) Iris Rogers	15	15
(Australia) Kay Marie Nesbit (Australia) Jay Nancy Twining	7	13
(New Zealand) Alison Glenie (New Zealand) Gaynor Simpson	17	15
(Canada) Alison Daysmith (Canada) Judy Humber	16	10

Semifinals
(England) Horton (England) Smith	18	15
(Malaysia) Siew Yong (Malaysia) Ang	13	6
(England) Bairstow (England) Rogers	15	15
(New Zealand) Glenie (New Zealand) Simpson	2	10

Finals
(England) Horton (England) Smith	15	15
(England) Bairstow (England) Rogers	7	7
Third place
(Malaysia) Siew Yong (Malaysia) Ang	15	15
(New Zealand) Glenie (New Zealand) Simpson	11	9

=== Mixed doubles ===
Quarterfinals
(England) Roger Mills (England) Angela Bairstow	15	15
(Malaysia) Tan Yee Khan (Malaysia) Rosalind Singha Ang	7	12
(Canada) Rolf Paterson (Canada) Sharon Whittaker	15	15
(Scotland) Mac Henderson (Scotland) Cathie Dunglison	11	9
(England) Tony Jordan (England) Jenny Horton	15	15
(Malaysia) Ng Boon Bee (Malaysia) Teoh Siew Yong	4	2
(Scotland) Bob McCoig (Scotland) Muriel Ferguson	15	15
(Canada) Edward Paterson (Canada) Alison Daysmith	8	2

Semifinals
(England) Mills (England) Bairstow	15	15
(Canada) Paterson (Canada) Whittaker	10	8
(England) Jordan (England) Horton	15	15
(Scotland) McCoig (Scotland) Ferguson	8	6

Finals
(England) Mills (England) Bairstow	7	15	15
(England) Jordan (England) Horton	15	8	12
Third place
(Scotland) McCoig (Scotland) Ferguson	15	15
(Canada) Paterson (Canada) Whittaker	7	4
