= Jim McNeillage =

Scottish international badminton player

Personal information
- Nationality: British (Scottish)
- Born: 1940
- Died: 20 October 2020

Sport
- Sport: Badminton
- Club: Edinburgh
Medal record
Representing Scotland
Scottish Nationals
Gold medal – first place	1969	men's doubles
Irish Open
Gold medal – first place	1968	men's doubles

Jim K. McNeillage (1940 – 20 October 2020) was an international badminton player from Scotland who competed at the Commonwealth Games.

== Biography ==
McNeillage played his badminton in Edinburgh and first came to prominence in 1962, winning the mixed doubles title at the Edinburgh tournament. The same year he passed his finals to become a chartered accountant and was predicted to be a future tennis star, playing at the Wimbledon junior championships and gaining a blue at The University of Edinburgh. Despite playing for the Liberton Club in Edinburgh and being a notable tennis player, it was badminton that he made his name, becoming a Scottish international player.

In November 1969 he was selected for the Scottish Commonwealth Games trials and McNeillage subsequently represented the Scottish team at the 1970 British Commonwealth Games in Edinburgh, Scotland, where he competed in the badminton events.

He won the 1968 Irish Open and was the 1969 men's doubles champion at the Scottish National Badminton Championships. In 1971 he won both the men's doubles and mixed doubles at the Meadowbank tournament.
