= Christine Stewart (badminton) =

Scottish international badminton player

Christine Stewart née Christine Evans
Personal information
- Nationality: British (Scottish)
- Born: 1947 (age 78–79) Gourock

Sport
- Sport: Badminton
- Club: Whitburn BC
Medal record
Representing Scotland
Scottish Nationals
Gold medal – first place	1971, 1975-1979	women's doubles
Gold medal – first place	1973, 75	mixed doubles
Irish Open
Gold medal – first place	1978	women's doubles
Gold medal – first place	1974	mixed doubles

Christine M. Stewart née Christine Evans (born 1947) is a former international badminton player from Scotland who competed at three Commonwealth Games.

== Biography ==
Born Christine Evans, she played her badminton out of Whitburn, West Lothian and was a Scottish international.

Evans specialised in doubles and represented the Scottish team at the 1970 British Commonwealth Games in Edinburgh, Scotland, where she competed in the mixed doubles event.

Evans won her first national doubles title in 1971 at the Scottish National Badminton Championships, partnering Maureen Hume.

After marrying she played under the name Christine Stewart and would go on to win five mixed doubles and two mixed doubles national titles and two Irish Opens. Additionally she appeared at the 1974 British Commonwealth Games and the 1978 Commonwealth Games.

In 1978 she was teamed with Anne Johnstone, also of Whitburn when winning the Greenock Open. In December 1979 Stewart missed defending her crown at the Scottish nationals because she had recently given birth.
