= Charlie Gallagher (badminton) =

Scottish international badminton player

Personal information
- Nationality: British (Scottish)
- Born: c.1957

Sport
- Sport: Badminton
- Club: Perth
Medal record
Representing Scotland
Scottish Nationals
| Gold medal – first place | 1980–83 | singles |

Charlie Gallagher (born c.1957) is a former international badminton player from Scotland who competed at the Commonwealth Games.

== Biography ==
A dentist by profession, Gallagher was based in Perth and represented Scotland at international level.

Gallagher represented the Scottish team at the 1982 Commonwealth Games in Brisbane, Australia, where he competed in the badminton events.

In 1983 he was presented with the D. K. Thomson award, for the Perth resident that made the greatest contribution to sports or art. He won the 1984 Lanarkshire Open Championships but lost in the final of the 1985 edition to Dan Travers.

He was four times singles champion at the Scottish National Badminton Championships from 1980 to 1983.

Gallagher established the Dental Technique Laboratory in 1989.
