= Eddie Wilson (sportsman) =

Scottish cricketer and badminton player

Personal information
- Full name: Edward Wardlaw Wilson
- Born: 19 August 1907; Burntisland, Fife, Scotland
- Died: 16 April 1982 (aged 74); Edinburgh, Midlothian, Scotland
- Batting: Left-handed

Domestic team information
- Years: Team
- 1936: Scotland

Career statistics
| Competition | First-class |
|---|---|
| Matches | 1 |
| Runs scored | 1 |
| Batting average | 0.50 |
| 100s/50s | –/– |
| Top score | 1 |
| Catches/stumpings | –/– |
- Source: Cricinfo, 7 July 2022

Edward Wardlaw Wilson (19 August 1907 – 16 April 1982) was a Scottish first-class cricketer and cricket administrator, and badminton player.

Wilson was born in August 1907 at Burntisland, Fife. He was educated in Edinburgh at the Royal High School, before matriculating to the University of Edinburgh to study law. A club cricketer for the Royal High School Cricket Club, for whom he scored heavily for, Wilson made a single appearance in first-class cricket for Scotland against Ireland at Edinburgh in 1936. Batting twice in the match, he was dismissed in the Scottish first innings without scoring by James Graham, while in their second innings he was dismissed for a single run by Charles Billingsley. He later served as the president of the Scottish Cricket Union in 1963.

In addition to playing cricket, Wilson was also a badminton player and was capped 25 times for Scotland between 1931 and 1950. Domestically, he was a six times Scottish National Badminton Championships doubles winner and a four times mixed doubles winner. In his legal career as a solicitor, Wilson was a partner in the firm Messrs Skene, Edwards & Garson. Wilson died at Edinburgh in April 1982.
