= Scottish National Badminton Championships =

Badminton event

The Scottish National Badminton Championships is a tournament organised to crown the best badminton players in Scotland. The tournament started in 1908 playing only mixed doubles and men's doubles.

== Past winners ==
Year	Men's singles	Women's singles	Men's doubles	Women's doubles	Mixed doubles
1908	no competition		no competition	no competition	H. J. H. Inglis; Balfour
1909	no competition		J. H. Cochrane; W. Cochrane	no competition	James Crombie; V. I. Todd
1910	no competition		James Crombie; H. J. H. Inglis	no competition	J. H. Cochrane; V. Lamb
1911	no competition		James Crombie; H. J. H. Inglis	no competition	James Crombie; V. I. Todd
1912	no competition		James Crombie; H. J. H. Inglis	no competition	J. E. Crabbie; D. Addis
1913	no competition		James Crombie; H. J. H. Inglis	no competition	James Crombie; M. Findlay
1914	no competition		James Crombie; H. J. H. Inglis	no competition	H. J. H. Inglis; H. C. A. Longmuir
1915; 1920	no competition				
1921	No competition		W. T. Henderson; J. W. Millar	No competition	James Crombie; E. C. F. MacDonald
1922	No competition		W. K. Tillie; J. W. Henderson	O'Connor; MacLehose	E. R. Butcher; M. C. F. Macfarlane
1923	No competition		R. T. Herbertson; H. E. B. Neilson	O'Connor; MacLehose	James Crombie; E. C. F. MacDonald
1924	No competition		E. R. Butcher; R. S. Jackson	E. C. F. MacDonald; K. M. Cochrane	R. S. Jackson; Herriot
1925	No competition		James Barr; H. E. B. Neilson	M. C. F. Macfarlane; Marion Armstrong	R. S. Jackson; Herriot
1926	No competition		E. R. Butcher; H. E. B. Neilson	E. C. F. MacDonald; K. M. Cochrane	E. R. Butcher; M. C. F. Macfarlane
1927	No competition		James Barr; H. E. B. Neilson	K. H. Dempster; B. S. Dempster	James Barr; C. T. Duncan
1928	No competition		James Barr; H. E. B. Neilson	M. K. King Clark; D. H. Ramage	James Barr; C. T. Duncan
1929	No competition		James Barr; H. E. B. Neilson	M. K. King Clark; D. H. Ramage	James Barr; C. T. Duncan
1930	No competition		James Barr; H. E. B. Neilson	M. K. King Clark; D. H. Ramage	James Barr; M. K. King Clark
1931	No competition		James Barr; T. G. Dempster	D. H. Stenhouse; J. M. Cassils	James Barr; M. K. King Clark
1932	No competition		James Barr; T. G. Dempster	D. H. Stenhouse; J. M. Cassils	E. D. Ballantine; M. Langmuir
1933	No competition		J. J. McCarry; Murdo MvLean	E. F. Ogilvie; Elisabeth Anderson	E. D. Ballantine; M. Langmuir
1934	No competition		E. R. Butcher; Edward Wilson	E. F. Ogilvie; Elisabeth Anderson	K. R. Davidson; J. R. Stewart
1935	No competition		E. R. Butcher; Edward Wilson	E. W. Greenwood; A. J. Gilzean	Edward Wilson; G. A. Bingham
1936	No competition		E. D. Ballantine; C. Skirving	G. A. Matheson; C. B. Alison	Edward Wilson; G. A. Bingham
1937	No competition		R. W. Stevenson Jr. G. M. Crabbie	C. P. R. Montgomery; E. Smart	Edward Wilson; B. H. Cuthbertson
1938	No competition		R. W. Stevenson Jr. G. M. Crabbie	E. F. Ogilvie; E. A. R. Anderson	Murdo MacLean; E. A. R. Andersen
1939	No competition		James Mackay; Edward Wilson	C. P. R. Montgomery; E. Smart	Edward Wilson; J. Holmes
1940; 1947	No competition				
1948	No competition		James Mackay; Edward Wilson	J. B. Shearlaw; C. B. Alison	James Mackay; C. B. Alison
1949	No competition		James Mackay; Edward Wilson	Marion Armstrong; E. W. Greenwood	James Mackay; C. B. Alison
1950	Alastair McIntyre	A. M. Horner	James Mackay; Edward Wilson	Marion Armstrong; E. W. Greenwood	J. S. Millar; J. A. S. Armstrong
1951	Alastair Russell	A. M. Horner	W. M. Williams; J. Stevenson	A. M. Horner; J. McGregor	James Mackay; A. M. Horner
1952	Alastair Russell	M. Robertson	James Mackay; J. B. Leslie	I. Vallance; J. McGregor	James Mackay; J. H. McGregor
1953	Alastair Russell	A. M. Horner	James Mackay; Wilfred Robinson	A. M. Horner; J. A. S. Armstrong	Alastair Russell; Isobel Montgomerie
1954	Alastair Russell	A. M. Horner	Alastair Russell; Alistair McIntyre	J. Smart; J. S. Vallence	Alastair Russell; Isobel Montgomerie
1955	Alastair Russell	Wilma Tyre	Alastair Russell; Alistair McIntyre	Cathie Dunglison; J. H. Dunglison	Alistair McIntyre; Eileen McKenzie
1956	Robert Fowlis	Wilma Tyre	Donald Ross; Frank Shannon	M. B. Forrester; Maggie McIntosh	Donald Ross; M. Greig
1957	Alastair Russell	Cathie Dunglison	Alastair Russell; Alistair McIntyre	Wilma Tyre; E. Tyre	Bob McCoig; Wilma Tyre
1958	Bob McCoig	Cathie Dunglison	Donald Ross; J. L. Young	Cathie Dunglison; J. Gordon	Bob McCoig; Wilma Tyre
1959	Bob McCoig	Wilma Tyre	Donald Ross; A. W. Horden	Cathie Dunglison; J. Gordon	Mac Henderson; Maggie McIntosh
1960	Bob McCoig	Wilma Tyre	Donald Ross; A. A. S. Morgan	Wilma Tyre; Maggie McIntosh	Bob McCoig; Wilma Tyre
1961	Bob McCoig	Wilma Tyre	Bob McCoig; Frank Shannon	Wilma Tyre; Maggie McIntosh	Robert Fowlis; A. Barclay
1962	Bob McCoig	Muriel Ferguson	Bob McCoig; Frank Shannon	Wilma Tyre; D. G. Calder	Bob McCoig; Wilma Tyre
1963	Bob McCoig	Muriel Ferguson	Bob McCoig; Frank Shannon	Cathie Dunglison; Muriel Ferguson	Mac Henderson; Cathie Dunglison
1964	Bob McCoig	Muriel Ferguson	Bob McCoig; Frank Shannon	E. Anderson; Muriel Ferguson	Bob McCoig; Wilma Reid
1965	Bob McCoig	Muriel Ferguson	Bob McCoig; Frank Shannon	Cathie Dunglison; Wilma Reid	Bob McCoig; Wilma Reid
1966	James Sydie	Muriel Ferguson	Bob McCoig; Frank Shannon	Cathie Dunglison; Wilma Reid	Mac Henderson; Cathie Dunglison
1967	Bob McCoig	Muriel Ferguson	Bob McCoig; J. Campbell	Cathie Dunglison; Muriel Ferguson	Bob McCoig; M. Tait
1968	Bob McCoig	Muriel Ferguson	Bob McCoig; J. Campbell	Wilma Reid; Muriel Ferguson	Bob McCoig; Wilma Reid
1969	Bob McCoig	Maureen Hume	Ian Hume; Jim McNeillage	Wilma Reid; Muriel Woodcock	Bob McCoig; Wilma Reid
1970	Bob McCoig	Maureen Hume	Bob McCoig; Mac Henderson	Wilma Reid; Margaret Gibson	Bob McCoig; Wilma Reid
1971	Bob McCoig	Maureen Hume	Bob McCoig; Fraser Gow	Christine Evans; Maureen Hume	Bob McCoig; Wilma Reid
1972	Bob McCoig	Helen Kelly	Bob McCoig; Fraser Gow	Helen Kelly; Joanna Flockhart	Ian Hume; Mary Odell
1973	Bob McCoig	Joanna Flockhart	Bob McCoig; Fraser Gow	Helen Kelly; Joanna Flockhart	Fraser Gow; Christine Stewart
1974	Nicol McCloy	Joanna Flockhart	Bob McCoig; Fraser Gow	Helen Kelly; Joanna Flockhart	A. John Britton; Christine Weir
1975	Nicol McCloy	Anne Johnstone	Jim Ansari; A. John Britton	Helen McIntosh; Christine Stewart	Fraser Gow; Christine Stewart
1976	Nicol McCloy	Joanna Flockhart	Jim Ansari; A. John Britton	Helen McIntosh; Christine Stewart	Billy Gilliland; Joanna Flockhart
1977	Nicol McCloy	Joanna Flockhart	Billy Gilliland; Fraser Gow	Joanna Flockhart; Christine Stewart	Billy Gilliland; Joanna Flockhart
1978	Ronnie Conway	Joanna Flockhart	Billy Gilliland; Fraser Gow	Anne Johnstone; Christine Stewart	Billy Gilliland; Joanna Flockhart
1979	Billy Gilliland	Joanna Flockhart	Fraser Gow; Gordon Hamilton	Joanna Flockhart; Christine Stewart	Billy Gilliland; Joanna Flockhart
1980	Charlie Gallagher	Joanna Flockhart	Billy Gilliland; Dan Travers	Christine Heatly; Joy Reid	Billy Gilliland; Joanna Flockhart
1981	Charlie Gallagher	Pamela Hamilton	Billy Gilliland; Dan Travers	Pamela Hamilton; Alison Fulton	Billy Gilliland; Joanna Flockhart
1982	Charlie Gallagher	Pamela Hamilton	Billy Gilliland; Dan Travers	Pamela Hamilton; Alison Fulton	Billy Gilliland; Christine Heatly
1983	Charlie Gallagher	Alison Fulton	Billy Gilliland; Dan Travers	Pamela Hamilton; Alison Fulton	Billy Gilliland; Christine Heatly
1984	Alex White	Alison Fulton	Billy Gilliland; Dan Travers	Morag Johnson; Alison Fulton	Billy Gilliland; Christine Heatly
1985	Alex White	Jenny Allen	Billy Gilliland; Dan Travers	Pamela Hamilton; Morag Johnson	Billy Gilliland; Christine Heatly
1986	Dan Travers	Jenny Allen	Billy Gilliland; Dan Travers	Jenny Allen; Elinor Allen	Billy Gilliland; Christine Heatly
1987	Kenny Middlemiss	Aileen Nairn	Alex White; Iain Pringle	Jenny Allen; Elinor Allen	Billy Gilliland; Christine Heatly
1988	Anthony Gallagher	Gillian Martin	Alex White; Iain Pringle	Jenny Allen; Elinor Allen	Gordon Hamilton; Fiona Stark
1989	Anthony Gallagher	Anne Gibson	Kenny Middlemiss; Dan Travers	Alison Gordon; Fiona Stark	Dan Travers; Aileen Nairn
1990	Anthony Gallagher	Anne Gibson	Kenny Middlemiss; Dan Travers	Alison Gordon; Fiona Stark	Dan Travers; Aileen Nairn
1991	Kevin Scott	Anne Gibson	Kenny Middlemiss; Russell Hogg	Jenny Allen; Elinor Allen	Dan Travers; Aileen Nairn
1992	Kevin Scott	Anne Gibson	Kenny Middlemiss; Russell Hogg	Jenny Allen; Elinor Allen	Kenny Middlemiss; Elinor Allen
1993	Jim Mailer	Anne Gibson	Kenny Middlemiss; Russell Hogg	Jenny Allen; Elinor Allen	Kenny Middlemiss; Elinor Allen
1994	Bruce Flockhart	Elinor Allen	Kenny Middlemiss; Russell Hogg	Jenny Allen; Elinor Allen	Kenny Middlemiss; Elinor Allen
1995	Bruce Flockhart	Anne Gibson	Kenny Middlemiss; Russell Hogg	Jenny Allen; Elinor Allen	Kenny Middlemiss; Elinor Allen
1996	Jim Mailer	Anne Gibson	Alastair Gatt; Craig Robertson	Jillian Haldane; Elinor Middlemiss	Kenny Middlemiss; Elinor Middlemiss
1997	Jim Mailer	Anne Gibson	Kenny Middlemiss; Russell Hogg	Elinor Middlemiss; Aileen Travers	David Gilmour; Elinor Middlemiss
1998	Bruce Flockhart	Gillian Martin	Kenny Middlemiss; Russell Hogg	Kirsteen McEwan; Sandra Watt	Kenny Middlemiss; Kirsteen McEwan
1999	Bruce Flockhart	Gillian Martin	Kenny Middlemiss; Russell Hogg	Kirsteen McEwan; Sandra Watt	Kenny Middlemiss; Kirsteen McEwan
2000	Bruce Flockhart	Fiona Sneddon	Alastair Gatt; Craig Robertson	Kirsteen McEwan; Sandra Watt	Kenny Middlemiss; Kirsteen McEwan
2001	Bruce Flockhart	Susan Hughes	Alastair Gatt; Craig Robertson	Rita Pickering; Sandra Watt	Russell Hogg; Kirsteen McEwan
2002	Bruce Flockhart	Yuan Wemyss	Russell Hogg; Graeme Smith	Sandra Watt; Yuan Wemyss	Craig Robertson; Yuan Wemyss
2003	Graham Simpson	Fiona Sneddon	Alastair Gatt; Kenny Middlemiss	Kirsteen McEwan; Elinor Middlemiss	Russell Hogg; Kirsteen McEwan
2004	Bruce Flockhart	Yuan Wemyss	David Gilmour; Craig Robertson	Kirsteen McEwan; Yuan Wemyss	Craig Robertson; Yuan Wemyss
2005	Craig Goddard	Yuan Wemyss	David Gilmour; Craig Robertson	Sandra Watt; Yuan Wemyss	Andrew Bowman; Kirsteen McEwan-Miller
2006	Craig Goddard	Susan Hughes	David Gilmour; Craig Robertson	Michelle Douglas; Yuan Wemyss	Andrew Bowman; Kirsteen McEwan-Miller
2007	Gordon Thomson	Rita Yuan Gao	Andrew Bowman; Watson Briggs	Susan Hughes; Rita Yuan Gao	Watson Briggs; Imogen Bankier
2008	Craig Goddard	Susan Hughes	Andrew Bowman; David Gilmour	Imogen Bankier; Emma Mason	Watson Briggs; Imogen Bankier
2009	Gordon Thomson	Susan Hughes	Thomas Bethell; Watson Briggs	Imogen Bankier; Jillie Cooper	Watson Briggs; Imogen Bankier
2010	Calum Menzies	Susan Egelstaff	Jamie Neill; Keith Turnbull	Imogen Bankier; Emma Mason	Watson Briggs; Imogen Bankier
2011	Kieran Merrilees	Susan Egelstaff	Jamie Neill; Keith Turnbull	Jillie Cooper; Emma Mason	Paul van Rietvelde; Imogen Bankier
2012	Kieran Merrilees	Kirsty Gilmour	Paul van Rietvelde; Watson Briggs	Jillie Cooper; Imogen Bankier	Watson Briggs; Imogen Bankier
2013	Calum Menzies	Kirsty Gilmour	Robert Blair; Gordon Thomson	Jillie Cooper; Kirsty Gilmour	Watson Briggs; Imogen Bankier
2014	Kieran Merrilees	Kirsty Gilmour	Robert Blair; Paul van Rietvelde	Imogen Bankier; Kirsty Gilmour	Robert Blair; Imogen Bankier
2015	Kieran Merrilees	Kirsty Gilmour	Martin Campbell; Patrick MacHugh	Imogen Bankier; Kirsty Gilmour	Robert Blair; Imogen Bankier
2016	Matthew Carder	Kirsty Gilmour	Robert Blair; Adam Hall	Rebekka Findlay; Kirsty Gilmour	Robert Blair; Imogen Bankier
2017	Kieran Merrilees	Kirsty Gilmour	Martin Campbell; Patrick MacHugh	Julie MacPherson; Eleanor O'Donnell	Patrick MacHugh; Kirsty Gilmour
2018	Kieran Merrilees	Kirsty Gilmour	Alexander Dunn; Adam Hall	Julie MacPherson; Eleanor O'Donnell	Alexander Dunn; Eleanor O'Donnell
2019	Kieran Merrilees	Kirsty Gilmour	Alexander Dunn; Adam Hall	Julie MacPherson; Holly Newall	Adam Hall; Julie MacPherson
2020	Kieran Merrilees	Holly Newall	Alexander Dunn; Adam Hall	Julie MacPherson; Ciara Torrance	Adam Hall; Julie MacPherson
2021	Callum Smith	Rachel Sugden	Christopher Grimley; Matthew Grimley	Julie MacPherson; Ciara Torrance	Matthew Grimley; Julie MacPherson
2022	Callum Smith	Rachel Sugden	Alexander Dunn; Adam Hall	Julie MacPherson; Ciara Torrance	Adam Hall; Julie MacPherson
2023	Callum Smith	Lauren Middleton	Alexander Dunn; Adam Hall	Julie MacPherson; Ciara Torrance	Adam Hall; Julie MacPherson
2024	Callum Smith	Rachel Sugden	Christopher Grimley; Matthew Grimley	Julie MacPherson; Ciara Torrance	Christopher Grimley; Eleanor O'Donnell
2025	Callum Smith	Rachel Sugden	Christopher Grimley; Matthew Grimley	Julie MacPherson; Ciara Torrance	Adam Pringle; Julie MacPherson
