= Yuan Wemyss =

Chinese-born Scottish badminton player

Personal information
- Born: 14 January 1976 (age 50) Wuhan, Hubei Province, China
- Height: 178 cm (5 ft 10 in)

Sport
- Country: Scotland
- Sport: Badminton
- Handedness: Right
- Coached by: Dan Travers
- Retired: in 2006
- Event: Women's singles & doubles

Women's singles & doubles
- BWF profile
Medal record
Women's badminton
Representing Scotland
Commonwealth Games
Bronze medal – third place	2002 Manchester	Mixed team

Yuan Wemyss (also known as Rita Yuan Gao, Yuan Gao and Rita Pickering; Chinese: 高源; born 14 January 1976) is a former Chinese-born Scottish badminton player who won Scottish National Championships 13 times.

== Career ==
Wemyss formerly played at the regional level in China. She temporarily left the sport in 1999 to study English at the Carlisle College. In Carlisle, she met Scottish national badminton coach Dan Travers who supported her playing badminton and representing Scotland. She there received the nickname Rita Yuan Gao.

Wemyss represented the Scottish team at the 2002 Commonwealth Games in Manchester, England, where she competed in the badminton events, winning a bronze medal as part of the mixed team.

She was four times singles champion, six-times doubles champion and twice mixed doubles champion at the Scottish National Badminton Championships.

As of 2012, Yuan Gao moved to Zurich, Switzerland for part-time study of a master of philosophy in sports studies at the University of Stirling with a coaching role at Swiss Badminton. She also served as a women's ambassador for Badminton World Federation. In 2013, she competed in World Senior Championships. Currently she is acting as Performance and Development Coach of Badminton Scotland.

== Family ==
Wemyss comes from Wuhan. Her father was a football coach and her brother was a professional player of Hubei Province. Her mother was a former Army administrator.

== Achievements ==
=== IBF World Grand Prix ===
The World Badminton Grand Prix sanctioned by International Badminton Federation (IBF) from 1983 to 2006.

Women's doubles
Year	Tournament	Partner	Opponent	Score	Result
2001	Dutch Open	(Scotland) Sandra Watt	(Netherlands) Erica van den Heuvel (Netherlands) Nicole van Hooren	4–15, 7–15	(silver) Runner-up

=== IBF International ===
Women's singles
Year	Tournament	Opponent	Score	Result
2006	Portugal International	(Canada) Anna Rice	21–9^{r}	(gold) Winner
2005	Miami International	(Canada) Anna Rice	11–3, 11–5	(gold) Winner
2005	Peru International	(Canada) Anna Rice	2–11, 11–1, 11–5	(gold) Winner
2005	Finnish International	(Scotland) Susan Hughes	8–11, 9–11	(silver) Runner-up
2005	Portugal International	(Switzerland) Jeanine Cicognini	7–11, 11–3, 11–8	(gold) Winner
2004	Scottish International	(England) Jill Pittard	11–4, 3–11, 13–10	(gold) Winner
2004	Iceland International	(Scotland) Susan Hughes	7–11, 2–11	(silver) Runner-up
2004	Norwegian International	(Germany) Petra Overzier	1–11, 6–11	(silver) Runner-up
2000	Irish International	(England) Elizabeth Cann	9–11, 11–2, 11–5	(gold) Winner
2000	New Zealand International	(New Zealand) Rhona Robertson	3–11, 9–11	(silver) Runner-up

Women's doubles
Year	Tournament	Partner	Opponent	Score	Result
2005	Portugal International	(Bulgaria) Petya Nedelcheva	(Germany) Kathrin Piotrowski (Germany) Sandra Marinello	15–8, 11–15, 2–15	(silver) Runner-up
2004	Welsh International	(Bulgaria) Petya Nedelcheva	(England) Katie Litherland (England) Julie Pike	17–14, 15–0	(gold) Winner
2004	Norwegian International	(Scotland) Michelle Douglas	(England) Liza Parker (England) Suzanne Rayappan	0–15, 15–13, 8–15	(silver) Runner-up
2002	Iceland International	(Scotland) Kirsteen McEwan	(Iceland) Katrin Atladóttir (Iceland) Drifa Hardardóttir	11–3, 11–4	(gold) Winner
2002	Scottish International	(Scotland) Kirsteen McEwan	(Germany) Nicole Grether (Germany) Juliane Schenk	Walkover	(gold) Winner
2002	Slovak International	(Scotland) Kirsteen McEwan	(Russia) Natalia Gorodnicheva (Russia) Elena Sukhareva	11–5, 11–5	(gold) Winner
2001	Scottish Open	(Scotland) Sandra Watt	(Scotland) Kirsteen McEwan (Scotland) Susan Hughes	7–4, 7–0, 6–8, 7–0	(gold) Winner

Mixed doubles
Year	Tournament	Partner	Opponent	Score	Result
2004	Iceland International	(Scotland) Graeme Smith	(England) Hayley Connor (England) Peter Jeffrey	7–15, 15–7, 13–15	(silver) Runner-up
