= Kenny Middlemiss =

Scottish badminton player

Personal information
- Born: 19 June 1964 (age 62) Edinburgh, Scotland
- Height: 1.79 m (5 ft 10 in)
- Spouse: Elinor Middlemiss

Sport
- Sport: Badminton
- Handedness: Right
- Event: Doubles

Doubles
- BWF profile

Kenneth Middlemiss (born 19 June 1964) is a Scottish former badminton player. He is a 19-times national champion and won 155 caps for the Scotland in badminton and represented Scotland in four consecutive Commonwealth Games between 1986 and 1998.

== Biography ==
Middlemiss represented the Scottish team at the 1986 Commonwealth Games in Edinburgh, Scotland, where he competed in the singles event and reached the quarter final. Four years later he represented the Scottish team again at the 1990 Commonwealth Games in Auckland, New Zealand.

He also played in World championships between 1989 and 1997. He has won titles mainly in European grand prix in Portugal, Ireland, Iceland, Slovenia, Spain & Austria. He also won one World grand prix tournament in United States besides couple of runner-up performances in France and Scotland. He is married to Elinor Middlemiss, another former player from his country.

Middlemiss was a 19-times champion at the Scottish National Badminton Championships.

== Achievements ==
=== IBF World Grand Prix ===
The World Badminton Grand Prix sanctioned by International Badminton Federation (IBF) from 1983 to 2006.

Men's singles
Year	Tournament	Opponent	Score	Result
1988	Swiss Open	(Malaysia) Kwan Yoke Meng	Walkover	(silver) Runner-up

Mixed doubles
Year	Tournament	Partner	Opponent	Score	Result
1998	U.S. Open	(Scotland) Elinor Middlemiss	(United States) Andy Chong (United States) Yeping Tang	10–15, 15–5, 15–8	(gold) Winner

=== IBF International ===
Men's singles
Year	Tournament	Opponent	Score	Result
1986	Portugal International	–, –	–, –	(gold) Winner

Men's doubles
Year	Tournament	Partner	Opponent	Score	Result
1989	Irish International	(Scotland) Dan Travers	(Scotland) Anthony Gallagher (Scotland) Russell Hogg	15–6, 15–6	(gold) Winner
1992	Iceland International	(Scotland) Russell Hogg	(England) Simon Archer (England) Julian Robertson	9–15, 9–15	(silver) Runner-up
1992	Amor International	(Scotland) Russell Hogg	(Iceland) Broddi Kristjánsson (Iceland) Árni Þór Hallgrímson	15–4, 15–12	(gold) Winner
1997	Portugal International	(Scotland) Russell Hogg	(Spain) Hugo Rodrigues (Spain) Fernando Silva	Walkover	(silver) Runner-up
1997	Slovenian International	(Scotland) Russell Hogg	(Austria) Harald Koch (Austria) Jürgen Koch	18–14, 15–5	(gold) Winner
1999	La Chaux-de-Fonds	(Scotland) Russell Hogg	(Indonesia) Aras Razak (Denmark) Henrik Sørensen	10–15, 9–15	(silver) Runner-up
1999	Scottish International	(Scotland) Russell Hogg	(Denmark) Michael Lamp (Denmark) Jonas Rasmussen	8–15, 11–15	(silver) Runner-up

Mixed doubles
Year	Tournament	Partner	Opponent	Score	Result
1986	Portugal International	(Portugal) Margarida Cruz	–, –	–, –	(gold) Winner
1992	Iceland International	(Scotland) Elinor Middlemiss	(England) Mike Brown (Iceland) Ása Pálsdóttir	15–9, 15–9	(gold) Winner
1994	Irish International	(Scotland) Elinor Middlemiss	(England) Ian Pearson (England) Karen Chapman	15–11, 10–15, 15–9	(gold) Winner
1997	Slovenian International	(Scotland) Elinor Middlemiss	(Scotland) Russell Hogg (Scotland) Jillian Haldane	15–10, 15–8	(gold) Winner
1997	French International	(Scotland) Elinor Middlemiss	(England) Peter Jeffrey (England) Sara Hardaker	8–15, 11–15	(silver) Runner-up
1997	Portugal International	(Scotland) Elinor Middlemiss	(Scotland) Russell Hogg (England) Karen Peatfield	Walkover	(silver) Runner-up
1997	Spanish International	(Scotland) Elinor Middlemiss	(Canada) Mike Beres (Canada) Kara Solmundson	15–8, 15–4	(gold) Winner
1998	Austrian International	(Scotland) Elinor Middlemiss	(Austria) Jürgen Koch (Austria) Irina Serova	18–15, 15–4	(gold) Winner
