= Gordon Thomson (badminton) =

Scottish badminton player (born 1985)

Personal information
- Born: 5 August 1985 (age 41)
- Height: 6 ft 0 in (183 cm)

Sport
- Country: Scotland
- Sport: Badminton
- Handedness: Right
- Coached by: Alan Thomson

Men's Singles & Men's Doubles
- Highest ranking: 139 (MS) 17 Dec 2009; 212 (MD) 16 Apr 2015
- BWF profile

Gordon Thomson (born 5 August 1985) is a Scottish male badminton player. He won two time Scottish National Badminton Championships men's singles event in 2007 and 2009.

== Achievements ==
=== BWF International Challenge/Series ===
Men's Doubles
| Year | Tournament | Partner | Opponent | Score | Result |
|---|---|---|---|---|---|
| 2014 | Welsh International | (Scotland) Adam Hall | (England) Matthew Nottingham (England) Harley Towler | 15-21, 13–21 | (silver) Runner-up |

BWF International Challenge tournament
BWF International Series tournament
BWF Future Series tournament
