= Christine Heatly =

Scottish international badminton player

Personal information
- Nationality: British (Scottish)
- Born: 16 September 1954

Sport
- Sport: Badminton
- Club: Edinburgh
Medal record
Representing Scotland
Commonwealth Games
Bronze medal – third place	1986 Edinburgh	mixed doubles
Scottish Nationals
Gold medal – first place	1980	doubles
Gold medal – first place	1982–87	mixed
Scottish Open
Gold medal – first place	1980	doubles
Irish Open
Gold medal – first place	1980	doubles
Gold medal – first place	1982–85	mixed

Christine Mcdiarmid Heatly married name Christine Black (born 16 September 1954) is a former international badminton player from Scotland who competed at two Commonwealth Games.

== Biography ==
Heatly was born in 1955 to a sporting family, her father Peter Heatly was a champion diver and winner of three Commonwealth Gold medals. Heatly was educated at George Watson's Ladies' College and was based in Edinburgh. She represented Scotland at international level, making her international debut in February 1980.

Heatly represented the Scottish team at the 1982 Commonwealth Games in Brisbane, Australia, where she competed in the badminton events.

In 1986 she represented her nation at the European Championships and also represented Scotland at the 1986 Commonwealth Games, winning a bronze medal in the mixed doubles with Billy Gilliland.

She was the seven-times champion at the Scottish National Badminton Championships, in the women's doubles in 1980 and the mixed doubles six years in succession from 1982 to 1987. Additionally, she was five titles at the Irish Open.

She married Scottish international hammer thrower Chris Black and as Christine Black she was badminton team manager for the 2002 and 2006 Commonwealth Games.
