= Helen Kelly (badminton) =

Scottish international badminton player

Personal information
- Nationality: British (Scottish)
- Born: c.1950

Sport
- Sport: Badminton
- Club: Union & Exiles BC, Aberdeen
Medal record
Representing Scotland
Scottish Nationals
Gold medal – first place	1972	singles
Gold medal – first place	1972, 73, 74, 75, 76	women's doubles
Irish Open
Gold medal – first place	1970	mixed doubles

Helen T. Kelly married name McIntosh (born c.1950) is a former international badminton player from Scotland who competed at two Commonwealth Games.

== Biography ==
Kelly was a member of the Union and Exiles Badminton Club in Aberdeen. She reached the final of the women's doubles at the 1968 North of Scotland Championships and the following year in 1969 she won both the singles and doubles at the same Championships.

In November 1969 she was selected for the Scottish Commonwealth Games trials and was a full Scottish international.

Kelly subsequently represented the Scottish team at the 1970 British Commonwealth Games in Edinburgh, Scotland, where she competed in the badminton events.

Kelly a secretary by profession, of Don Terrace Woodside, Aberdeen, married Tom McIntosh in March 1974 and played under her married name thereafter.

She won the 1972 singles title and five consecutive women's doubles titles at the Scottish National Badminton Championships. Addiitonally, she won the 1970 Irish Open and represented Scotland at the 1974 British Commonwealth Games in Christchurch, New Zealand,
