= Adam Flockhart =

Scottish badminton player (born 1945)

Personal information
- Nationality: British (Scottish)
- Born: c.1943

Sport
- Sport: Badminton
- Club: Dunfermline BC

Adam Flockhart (born c.1943) is a former international badminton player from Scotland who competed at the Commonwealth Games.

== Biography ==
Flockhart was a member of the Dunfermline Badminton Club. In 1966, shortly after the 1966 British Commonwealth Games, he was listed as a possible for the 1970 British Commonwealth Games and made his international debut in January 1967.

He was the 1968 and 1969 East of Scotland champion and the 1969 North of Scotland Cchampion. In November 1969 he was selected for the Scottish Commonwealth Games trials.

Flockhart subsequently represented the Scottish team at the 1970 British Commonwealth Games in Edinburgh, Scotland, where he competed in the badminton events.

He married fellow badminton player Joanna Liddle in 1968, and settled in Dunfermline after the marriage. Their son Bruce Lockhart won the Scottish National Badminton Championships eight times and their grandson Calum Flockhart won the 2025 Midland Silver Badminton Championships.
