= Callum Smith (badminton) =

Scottish international badminton player

Personal information
- Nationality: British (Scottish)
- Born: 9 March 2002

Sport
- Sport: Badminton
- Club: Badminton Scotland
- Coached by: Ingo Kindervater / Robert Blair
Medal record
Representing Scotland
Scottish Nationals
Gold medal – first place	2021–25	singles

Callum Smith (born 9 March 2002) is an international badminton player from Scotland who competed at the Commonwealth Games.

== Biography ==
Smith was born in 2002 and at the age of 4 started playing badminton at his local club. He won 10 Scottish Junior National titles.

Smith was selected for the 2022 Commonwealth Games in Birmingham, England and he subsequently represented the Scottish team, participating in the badminton events.

Smith has reached the ranking of the Scottish number 1 and has won five consecutive singles titles at the Scottish National Badminton Championships from 2021 to 2025.
