= Craig Robertson (badminton) =

Scottish international badminton player

Personal information
- Nationality: British (Scottish)
- Born: 9 January 1970

Sport
- Sport: Badminton
- Club: Fauldhouse
Medal record
Representing Scotland
Commonwealth Games
Bronze medal – third place	2002 Manchester	Mixed team
Scottish Nationals
Gold medal – first place	1996, 2000, 01, 04–06	doubles
Gold medal – first place	2002, 04	mixed
Scottish Open
Gold medal – first place	2000	doubles

Craig Robertson (born 9 January 1970) is a former international badminton player from Scotland who competed at the Commonwealth Games.

== Biography ==
Robertson born in 1970, was based in Fauldhouse, West Lothian and represented Scotland at international level.

In 1996, he partnered up with Alastair Gatt and formed a successful doubles team, winning their first Scottish National Badminton Championships in 1996. The following year in 1997 he moved to Denmark for one year, in order to play badminton in Lillerød.

Robertson represented the Scottish team at the 1998 Commonwealth Games in Kuala Lumpur, Malaysia, where he competed in the badminton events.

He was twice more doubles championships at the Scottish National Badminton Championships with Gatt in 2000 and 2001, before once again partnering Gatt at the 2002 Commonwealth Games. He also won a mixed team bronze medal at the Games.

Robertson won three more national doubles titles with David Gilmour from 2004 to 2006.
