= Muriel Woodcock =

Scottish badminton player

Muriel Woodcock née Ferguson
Personal information
- Nationality: British (Scottish)
- Born: c.1940 Greenock, Scotland

Sport
- Sport: Badminton
- Event(s): singles, doubles
- Club: Ardgowan BC; Cazinove BC, Middlesex
Medal record
Women's badminton
Representing Scotland
Commonwealth Games
Bronze medal – third place	1966 Kingston	Mixed doubles

Muriel Woodcock (née Ferguson) (born c.1940) is a former badminton player from Scotland who won a bronze medal at the Commonwealth Games.

== Biography ==
Born Muriel Ferguson, she won seven consecutive Scottish National singles titles, in addition to five doubles titles. Ferguson also won two Scottish Open singles titles.

Ferguson represented the Scotland team at the 1966 British Empire and Commonwealth Games in Kingston, Jamaica, in the singles, doubles and mixed doubles events, where she won a mixed doubles bronze medal with Bob McCoig. At the time of the games she was based in London and played for the Cazinove Badminton Club in Middlesex.

Ferguson married in 1969 and played under her married name of Woodcock thereafter.

Partnering Bob McCoig again, Woodcock was runner-up in mixed doubles at the prestigious All-England Championships in 1968.
