= Bruce Flockhart (badminton) =

Scottish international badminton player (born 1972)

Personal information
- Nationality: British (Scottish)
- Born: 8 September 1972

Sport
- Sport: Badminton
- Club: Dunfermline
Medal record
Representing Scotland
2002 Manchester
Bronze medal – third place	2002 Manchester	Mixed team
Scottish Nationals
Gold medal – first place	1994, 95, 1998–2002, 04	singles
Scottish Open
Gold medal – first place	1993	singles

Bruce Flockhart (born 8 September 1972) is a former international badminton player from Scotland who competed at three Commonwealth Games.

== Biography ==
Flockhart was born in 1972 into a badminton family, his parents were Adam Flockhart and Joanna Flockhart. Bruce was based in Dunfermline and represented Scotland at international level.

He was a bursar at the University of Stirling by profession and reached the number 1 ranking in Scotland.

In 1994 he won the first of his eight singles titles at the Scottish National Badminton Championships and represented the Scottish team at the 1994 Commonwealth Games in Victoria, Canada, where he competed in the badminton events.

Four years later he went to his second Games at the 1998 Commonwealth Games in Kuala Lumpur, Malaysia, by which time he had secured his second and third national singles titles.

In 2000, he was based in Kelty, Fife, and unfortunately missed the 2000 Summer Olympics due to injury. However, he did attend a third Commonwealth Games in 2002 and won a bronze medal in the mixed team event.

At retirement he was an eight times singles champion of Scotland.
