= Glenn Stewart (badminton) =

New Zealand badminton player

Medal record

Men's badminton

Representing New Zealand

Commonwealth Games
Bronze medal – third place	1986 Glasgow	Men's doubles

Glenn Stewart is a New Zealand badminton player who competed for New Zealand at the 1986 and 1990 Commonwealth Games.

Stewart with Kerrin Harrison won a bronze in the men's doubles at the 1986 Commonwealth Games, and also won the men's doubles at the 1986 French Open.
