= Elinor Middlemiss =

Scottish badminton player

Elinor Middlemiss MBE née Elinor Allen
Personal information
- Born: 28 January 1967 (age 59)
- Height: 1.58 m (5 ft 2 in)
- Spouse: Kenny Middlemiss

Sport
- Country: Scotland
- Sport: Badminton
- Handedness: Right
- Event: Doubles

Doubles
- BWF profile
Medal record
Women's badminton
Representing Scotland
Commonwealth Games
Bronze medal – third place	1998 Kuala Lumpur	Women's doubles
Bronze medal – third place	2002 Manchester	Mixed team

Elinor Muriel Middlemiss MBE (née Elinor Allen; born 28 January 1967) is a former badminton player from Scotland who won two medals at the Commonwealth Games. At present she is working as Games team operations manager of Badminton Scotland Commonwealth games.

== Biography ==
Born Elinor Allen to a sporting family, her mother Gladys Massie was an international badminton player. In her junior days she won national junior championships for five times. Allen played out of Edinburgh and her sister Jenny Allen was also a Scottish international player.

She married fellow Scottish international player Kenny Middlemiss and played under her married name thereafter. Middlemiss contested five Commonwealth Games between 1986 and 2002, winning two bronze medals in both individual (in 1998) and team event (in 2002).

By September 1995, she had made over 100 appearances for Scotland and played for her country in eight Uber Cups, eight European Team Championships and six World Championships, eventually earning a Scottish women's record of 136 international cap and 22 national titles.

She was an advanced coach at equivalent of UKCC level 2 and has coached at World University Games and World University Championship level. Middlemiss was appointed as Team Scotland Chief-de-Mission for the 2022 Commonwealth Games, having previously served as a deputy chief in 2014 Commonwealth Games and 2018 Commonwealth Games. She was the first woman to hold this post since the games began in 1930.

Middlemiss was appointed Member of the Order of the British Empire (MBE) in the 2024 New Year Honours for services to sport.

She has 2 children, Andrew Middlemiss born in 1999 and Kim Middlemiss born in 2001.

== Achievements ==
=== Commonwealth Games ===
Women's doubles
Year	Venue	Partner	Opponent	Score	Result
1998	Kuala Lumpur Badminton Stadium; Kuala Lumpur, Malaysia	(Scotland) Sandra Watt	(England) Donna Kellogg (England) Joanne Goode	7–15, 3–15	Bronze

=== IBF World Grand Prix ===
The World Badminton Grand Prix sanctioned by International Badminton Federation (IBF) from 1983 to 2006.

Women's doubles
Year	Tournament	Partner	Opponent	Score	Result
1998	U.S. Open	(Scotland) Kirsteen McEwan	(Canada) Milaine Cloutier (Canada) Robbyn Hermitage	7–15, 15–5, 15–2	(gold) Winner

Mixed doubles
Year	Tournament	Partner	Opponent	Score	Result
1998	U.S. Open	(Scotland) Kenny Middlemiss	(United States) Andy Chong (United States) Yeping Tang	10–15, 15–5, 15–8	(gold) Winner

=== IBF International ===
Women's singles
Year	Tournament	Opponent	Score	Result
1986	Iceland International	(Scotland) Jill Barrie	11–3, 11–5	(gold) Winner

Women's doubles
Year	Tournament	Partner	Opponent	Score	Result
1985	Irish International	(Scotland) Pamela Hamilton	(England) Alison Fisher (England) Fiona Elliott	16–18, 1–15	(silver) Runner-up
1989	Bells Open	(Scotland) Jenny Allen	(England) Karen Chapman (England) Sara Sankey	15–18, 15–0, 4–15	(silver) Runner-up
1989	Irish International	(Scotland) Jenny Allen	(England) Julie Bradbury (England) Suzanne Louis-Lane	15–7, 15–9	(gold) Winner
1991	Swiss Open	(Scotland) Jenny Allen	(Germany) Katrin Schmidt (Germany) Kerstin Ubben	9–15, 6–15	(silver) Runner-up
1991	French Open	(Scotland) Jenny Allen	(Germany) Katrin Schmidt (Germany) Kerstin Ubben	10–15, 7–15	(silver) Runner-up
1992	Iceland International	(Scotland) Jenny Allen	(Iceland) Thordis Edwald (Iceland) Ása Pálsdóttir	15–5 15–3	(gold) Winner
1996	French International	(Scotland) Jillian Haldane	(Netherlands) Brenda Conijn (Netherlands) Nicole van Hooren	17–15, 6–15, 9–15	(silver) Runner-up
1997	Spanish International	(Scotland) Sandra Watt	(Canada) Beth Richardson (Canada) Jennifer Wong	15–5, 15–2	(gold) Winner
1997	Scottish International	(Scotland) Sandra Watt	(England) Sara Sankey (England) Ella Miles	13–15, 12–15	(silver) Runner-up
1997	Slovenian International	(Scotland) Sandra Watt	(England) Felicity Gallup (England) Joanne Muggeridge	10–15, 15–7, 18–15	(gold) Winner
1998	Austrian International	(Scotland) Sandra Watt	(Italy) Maria Luisa Mur (Italy) Monica Memoli	15–10, 15–3	(gold) Winner

Mixed doubles
Year	Tournament	Partner	Opponent	Score	Result
1985	Irish International	(Scotland) Billy Gilliland	(Scotland) Dan Travers (Scotland) Pamela Hamilton	17–16, 15–13	(gold) Winner
1986	Iceland International	(Scotland) Alastair Baker	(Scotland) Jill Barrie (Scotland) Rose Gladwin	15–7, 15–13	(gold) Winner
1992	Iceland International	(Scotland) Kenny Middlemiss	(England) Mike Brown (Iceland) Ása Pálsdóttir	15–9, 15–9	(gold) Winner
1994	Irish International	(Scotland) Kenny Middlemiss	(England) Ian Pearson (England) Karen Chapman	15–11, 10–15, 15–9	(gold) Winner
1997	Slovenian International	(Scotland) Kenny Middlemiss	(Scotland) Russell Hogg (Scotland) Jillian Haldane	15–10, 15–8	(gold) Winner
1997	French International	(Scotland) Kenny Middlemiss	(England) Peter Jeffrey (England) Sara Hardaker	8–15, 11–15	(silver) Runner-up
1997	Portugal International	(Scotland) Kenny Middlemiss	(Scotland) Russell Hogg (England) Karen Peatfield	Walkover	(silver) Runner-up
1997	Spanish International	(Scotland) Kenny Middlemiss	(Canada) Mike Beres (Canada) Kara Solmundson	15–8, 15–4	(gold) Winner
1998	Austrian International	(Scotland) Kenny Middlemiss	(Austria) Jürgen Koch (Austria) Irina Serova	18–15, 15–4	(gold) Winner
