= Anne Johnstone (badminton) =

Scottish international badminton player

Personal information
- Nationality: British (Scottish)
- Born: c.1955

Sport
- Sport: Badminton
- Club: Whitburn BC
Medal record
Representing Scotland
Scottish Nationals
Gold medal – first place	1975	singles
Gold medal – first place	1978	doubles
Irish Open
Gold medal – first place	1978	doubles

Anne Johnstone (born c.1955) is a former international badminton player from Scotland who competed at the Commonwealth Games.

== Biography ==
Johnstone lived at 4 Dean Street in Whitburn, West Lothian and was a physical education teacher by profession at Whitburn Academy.

She was the highest ranked Scottish woman in 1975. and in 1977 won three titles at the Scottish invitational and the following year in 1978 she won the Greenock Open singles and also teamed up with Christine Stewart, also of Whitburn, to win the doubles.

Johnstone represented the Scottish team at the 1978 Commonwealth Games in Edmonton, Canada, where she competed in the badminton events.

Johnstone was the 1975 singles champion and 1978 doubles champion at the Scottish National Badminton Championships. Additionally, she was the doubles champion at the 1978 Irish Open.

Her brother Jimmy also played badminton to a high standard.
