= Cathie Dunglison =

Scottish badminton player

Personal information
- Nationality: British (Scottish)
- Born: Scotland

Sport
- Sport: Badminton
- Event(s): singles, doubles
- Club: Pollockshields BC, Glasgow; Western BC, Edinburgh

Catherine "Cathie" E. Dunglison is a former badminton player from Scotland who competed at the Commonwealth Games.

== Biography ==
Dunglison originally played her badminton in the Bridge of Allan before joining the Pollockshields Badminton Club in Glasgow and made her Scottish international debut in January 1957.

Dunglison's best achievements came in doubles competition and she was able to compete with the world's best in the doubles format. In 1964 she was playing for the Western Club in Edinburgh. Dunglison won eleven Scottish National titles, spanning a 13-year period from 1955 to 1967. It consisted of two singles, seven doubles and two mixed doubles crowns. She also won two Scottish Open titles in 1963 and 1965 respectively.

Dunglison represented the Scotland team at the 1966 British Empire and Commonwealth Games in Kingston, Jamaica, in the two events; partnering Muriel Ferguson in the women's doubles and Mac Henderson in the mixed doubles.
