= Maureen Hume =

Scottish international badminton player

Personal information
- Nationality: British (Scottish)
- Born: born c.1941
- Died: 21 October 1971 (aged 30) Clarkston, East Renfrewshire, Scotland

Sport
- Sport: Badminton
- Club: Glasgow BC
Medal record
Representing Scotland
Scottish Nationals
Gold medal – first place	1969, 70, 71	singles
Gold medal – first place	1971	doubles
Scottish Open
Gold medal – first place	1993	singles

Maureen Hume formerly Maureen Ross (c.1941 – 21 October 1971) was an international badminton player from Scotland who competed at the Commonwealth Games.

== Biography ==
Formerly Maureen Ross, she took the surname of fellow international player Ian Hume, whom she lived with and played under the name Maureen Hume.

Hume played badminton out of Glasgow and won the first of her three singles titles at Scottish National Badminton Championships in 1968.

Hume was a Scottish international and represented her nation in world tournaments including the Uber Cup. She won the 1969 East of Scotland title defeating Joanna Flockhart in the final and reached the final again the following year. In November 1969 she was selected for the Scottish Commonwealth Games trials.

Hume subsequently represented the Scottish team at the 1970 British Commonwealth Games in Edinburgh, Scotland, competing in the badminton events.

On 21 October 1971 Hume was killed in the Clarkston explosion. At the time of her death she was living at 51 Busby Road in Clarkston and had earned 15 Scottish caps from 1966 to 1971.
