= Kevin Scott (badminton) =

Scottish international badminton player

Personal information
- Nationality: British (Scottish)
- Born: July 1964

Sport
- Sport: Badminton
- Club: Guildford
Medal record
Representing Scotland
Scottish Nationals
Gold medal – first place	1991, 1992	singles

Kevin Scott (born July 1964) is a former international badminton player from Scotland who competed at the Commonwealth Games.

== Biography ==
Scott was based in Guildford, England but represented Scotland at international level and became the Scottish number 1 ranked player.

Scott represented the Scottish team at the 1990 Commonwealth Games in Auckland, New Zealand, where he competed in the badminton events.

He was the singles champion at the Scottish National Badminton Championships in 1991 and 1992.

Scott was a Director of Badminton Europe from 2011 to 2017 and in 2025, he became the Chair of Badminton Scotland.
