= Jim Ansari =

Scottish international badminton player

Personal information
- Nationality: British (Scottish)

Sport
- Sport: Badminton
- Club: Glasgow BC
Medal record
Representing Scotland
Scottish Nationals
| Gold medal – first place | 1975, 1976 | Men's doubles |
Scottish Open
| Gold medal – first place | 1973 | Men's doubles |
Irish Open
| Gold medal – first place | 1974 | Men's doubles |

Jim Ansari is a former international badminton player from Scotland who competed at the Commonwealth Games.

== Biography ==
Ansari was a Scottish international and in 1976 was playing out of Kilwinning,

Ansari represented the Scottish team at the 1974 British Commonwealth Games in Christchurch, New Zealand, where he competed in the badminton events.

He formed a successful doubles partnership with John Britton and was twice doubles champion at the Scottish National Badminton Championships in 1975 and 1976. Additionally, he won the doubles at the Scottish Open and the Irish Open.

In 1979 he was also playing in the German leagues for Wolfsburg and in 1983 he represented the East.
