= Andrew Bowman =

Scottish badminton player (born 1984)

Personal information
- Nationality: British (Scottish)
- Born: 21 June 1984 (age 42)

Sport
- Sport: Badminton
- Club: Bellshill
Medal record
Representing Scotland
Scottish Nationals
Gold medal – first place	2007, 08	doubles
Gold medal – first place	2005, 06	mixed doubles
Welsh International
Gold medal – first place	2008	doubles

Andrew Bowman (born 21 June 1984) is a former international badminton player from Scotland who competed at the Commonwealth Games.

== Biography ==
Bowman born in 1984, was educated at Belvidere Primary School and Bellshill Academy.

Bowman was based in Bellshill and in December 1999, won three U17 titles at the 1999 East of Scotland Junior Championships. He represented Scotland at international level, making his international debut while still a junior.

Bowman represented the Scottish team at the 2006 Commonwealth Games in Melbourne, Australia, where he competed in the badminton events.

He was twice the men's doubles champion and twice the mixed doubles champion at the Scottish National Badminton Championships.

After finishing his playing career he became a coach.
