= Alison Fulton =

Scottish international badminton player

Personal information
- Nationality: British (Scottish)
- Born: born c.1957

Sport
- Sport: Badminton
- Club: Guildford
Medal record
Representing Scotland
Scottish Nationals
Gold medal – first place	1983–84	singles
Gold medal – first place	1981–84	doubles
Scottish Open
Gold medal – first place	1984	doubles
Irish Open
Gold medal – first place	1982	doubles

Alison Fulton (born c.1957) is a former international badminton player from Scotland who competed at two Commonwealth Games.

== Biography ==
Fulton was based in Guildford, England but represented Scotland at international level. In 1984 she became the first Scotthish player for 19 years to win a title at the Scottish International Championships.

Fulton represented the Scottish team at the 1982 Commonwealth Games in Brisbane, Australia, where she competed in the badminton events. Four years later, she was denied an almost certain team bronze medal at the 1986 Commonwealth Games, when in the third team match (her doubles) she sustained a leg injury and was carried off the court with Scotland leading Australia 2–0.

She was the six-times champion at the Scottish National Badminton Championships, twice in the singles in 1983 and 1984 and four times in the doubles from 1981 to 1984.

Additionally, she was the doubles champion at the Scottish Open and Irish Opens. In 1986 she represented her nation at the European Championships.

In 1990, she was working as the Scottish national U18 coach and in 1992 became the first woman to take the position of head coach at the European Badminton Union's summer school in the Netherlands.
