= Pamela Hamilton =

Scottish international badminton player

Personal information
- Nationality: British (Scottish)
- Born: 16 November 1958
- Died: 25 January 2008 (aged 49)

Sport
- Sport: Badminton
- Club: Airdrie BC
Medal record
Representing Scotland
Scottish Nationals
Gold medal – first place	1981, 82	singles
Gold medal – first place	1981, 82, 83, 85	women's doubles
Irish Open
Gold medal – first place	1977, 82, 83	singles
Gold medal – first place	1982	women'sdoubles
Gold medal – first place	1977	mixed doubles

Pamela Hamilton (16 November 1958 – 25 January 2008) was an international badminton player from Scotland who competed at two Commonwealth Games and earned 74 caps for Scotland from 1975 to 1988.

== Biography ==
Hamilton playing out of Airdrie, North Lanarkshire and was a Scottish international.

Hamilton represented the Scottish team at the 1978 Commonwealth Games in Edmonton, Canada, where she competed in the badminton events. Hamilton would also go on represent the Scottish team at the 1982 Commonwealth Games in Brisbane, Australia, where she competed in the badminton events.

In 1984 she played in the Uber Cup and in 1986 she was in New Malden and represented her nation at the European Championships. By 1986 she was also the Scottish number 2 ranked player and also became the nation's second most capped player. The following year she was based in Guildford.

She was twice a singles champion and four times a doubles champion at the Scottish National Badminton Championships. Additionally, she won four titles at the Irish Open.

Hamilton died in 2008.
