= Joanna Flockhart =

Scottish badminton player (born 1947)

Joanna Flockhart (née Liddle)
Personal information
- Nationality: British (Scottish)
- Born: Q2.1947 Lancaster, Lancashire, England

Sport
- Sport: Badminton
- Club: Newmills BC; Dunfermline BC
Medal record
Women's badminton
Representing Scotland
World Championships
Bronze medal – third place	1977 Malmö	Mixed doubles
Commonwealth Games
Silver medal – second place	1978 Edmonton	Mixed doubles
European Championships
Bronze medal – third place	1976 Dublin	Women's doubles
Bronze medal – third place	1978 Preston	Mixed doubles

Joanna Doreen Flockhart, née Liddle (born 1947) is a retired female badminton player of Scotland, who won a medal at the world championships and competed at three Commonwealth Games.

== Biography ==
Born Joanna Liddle, in Lancashire, she lived in Harrogate, Yorkshire and began her badminton career whilst still single.

She married fellow badminton player Adam Flockhart in 1968, and settled in Dunfermline after the marriage and played under her married name thereafter.

She contested the 1969 East of Scotland final and in November 1969 she was selected for the Scottish Commonwealth Games trials.

Flockhart represented the Scottish team at the 1970 British Commonwealth Games in Edinburgh, Scotland, where she competed in the badminton events.

In 1972, she won the first of her 18 titles at the Scottish National Badminton Championships. She won the bronze medal at the 1977 IBF World Championships in mixed doubles with Billy Gilliland. and also won medals at the Commonwealth Games and European Championships.

In 1981 she retired from county matches due to the 450-mile round trip from her home in Dunfermline to play for her Yorkshire county team.

Her son Bruce Lockhart won the Scottish National Badminton Championships eight times and her grandson Calum Flockhart won the 2025 Midland Silver Badminton Championships.
