= Anthony Gallagher =

Scottish international badminton player

Personal information
- Nationality: British (Scottish)
- Born: 12 October 1963 Dungloe, Ireland

Sport
- Sport: Badminton
- Club: Perth
Medal record
Representing Scotland
Scottish Nationals
Gold medal – first place	1988–1990	singles
Irish Open
Gold medal – first place	1989	singles

Anthony Gallagher (born 12 October 1963) is a former international badminton player from Scotland who competed at the Commonwealth Games.

== Biography ==
Gallagher was born in 1963 in Dungloe, Ireland but for most of his career was based in Perth and in 1988 he became the Scottish number 1 ranked player.

A postal worker by profession, he won three consecutive singles titles at the Scottish National Badminton Championships from 1988 to 1990 and won the 1989 Irish Open.

Gallagher represented the Scottish team at the 1990 Commonwealth Games in Auckland, New Zealand, where he competed in the badminton events. Despite playing for Scotland for 4 years, he nearly missed the Games because he only held an Irish passport at the time. Shortly after the Games in September 1990 he announced his retirement.
