= Jillian Haldane =

Scottish international badminton player

Personal information
- Nationality: British (Scottish)
- Born: 10 November 1971

Sport
- Sport: Badminton
- Club: Kirkcaldy
Medal record
Representing Scotland
Scottish Nationals
Gold medal – first place	1996	doubles

Jillian Haldane (born 10 November 1971) is a former international badminton player from Scotland who competed at the Commonwealth Games.

== Biography ==
Haldane was born in 1971 and her older brother Gordon Haldane was also an international player. She was based in Kirkcaldy and won four age restricted titles at the 1990 Clydesdale Bank Championships.

Haldane was a District Council sales officer by profession and represented Scotland at international level. and in 1992, she teamed up with a new doubles partner in Jenny Allen.

Haldane represented the Scottish team at the 1994 Commonwealth Games in Victoria, Canada, where she competed in the badminton events.

Haldane was the doubles champion at the Scottish National Badminton Championships in 1996 but the same year, she suffered a serious knee injury which kept her out of action for 18 months.
