= Fraser Gow =

Scottish international badminton player

Personal information
- Nationality: British (Scottish)
- Born: c.1948

Sport
- Sport: Badminton
- Club: Alexandria BC
Medal record
Representing Scotland
Scottish Nationals
Gold medal – first place	1971, 72, 73, 74, 77, 78, 79	men's doubles
Gold medal – first place	1973, 75	mixed doubles
Scottish Open
Gold medal – first place	1972	men's doubles
Gold medal – first place	1973	mixed doubles
Irish Open
Gold medal – first place	1970	men's doubles
Gold medal – first place	1974	mixed doubles

Fraser D. Gow (born c.1948) is a former international badminton player from Scotland who competed at three Commonwealth Games.

== Biography ==
Gow was a member of the Alexandria Badminton Club and won the 1968 Scottish junior title. He was a Scottish international and in 1976 became the captain of his country.

Gow represented the Scottish team at the 1970 British Commonwealth Games in Edinburgh, Scotland, where he competed in the badminton events.

In 1976, Gow was based in England and played in Andover and played county badminton for Cambridgeshire.

He was a nine-times title winner at the Scottish National Badminton Championships and twice winner of the Scottish Open. Additionally, he went on to represent Scotland at both the 1974 British Commonwealth Games and the 1978 Commonwealth Games.
