= Bob McCoig =

Scottish badminton player

- McCoig in 1963

Personal information
- Nationality: British (Scottish)
- Born: 18 March 1937 Scotland
- Died: 31 August 1998 (aged 61) Colchester, England

Sport
- Sport: Badminton
- Events: singles, doubles
- Club: Cazinove BC, Middlesex
Medal record
Men's badminton
Representing Scotland
Commonwealth Games
Bronze medal – third place	1966 Kingston	Mixed doubles
European Championships
Bronze medal – third place	1968 Bochum	Men's doubles

Robert Scrymgeour McCoig (18 March 1937 – 31 August 1998) was a Scottish badminton player who won numerous national and international titles from the late 1950s to the mid-1970s.

== Biography ==
McCoig was educated at Greenock High School and studied at the University of Glasgow.

McCoig captured a record fifteen Scottish National singles titles, as well as several Scottish Open singles titles, his greatest international victories came in doubles. He was especially successful in three North American forays which yielded a pair of U.S. Open men's doubles titles (1963, 1965), a pair of Canadian Open men's doubles titles (1963, 1969), and the mixed doubles title of each nation in 1965. With Muriel Woodcock (née Ferguson) McCoig was runner-up in mixed doubles at the prestigious All-England Championships in 1968. He represented Scotland in seven consecutive Thomas Cup (men's international team) campaigns from 1957 to 1976.

He represented the Scotland team at the 1966 British Empire and Commonwealth Games in Kingston, Jamaica, in the singles, doubles and mixed doubles events. He won a mixed doubles bronze medal with Muriel Ferguson and was living at Woodhouse Avenue in Perivale at the time.

McCoig received an award of the Member of the Order of the British Empire (MBE) for services rendered to Scottish badminton.

McCoig died in 1998 at the age of 61.
