= Mike Brown (badminton) =

English badminton player

Personal information
- Born: Michael Brown; 13 March 1957 (age 69) Yorkshire, England

Sport
- Country: England
- Sport: Badminton
- Handedness: Right
- BWF profile

Michael Brown (born 13 March 1957) is a former English badminton international player and a former national champion.

== Biography ==
Brown who represented Yorkshire became an English National doubles champion after winning the English National Badminton Championships men's doubles title with Andy Goode in 1990.

In 2007, he won the +40 men's doubles title at the All England Senior Championships partnered with Nitin Panesar.

== Achievements ==
=== IBF World Grand Prix ===
The World Badminton Grand Prix sanctioned by International Badminton Federation (IBF) since 1983.

Mixed doubles
| Year | Tournament | Partner | Opponent | Score | Result |
|---|---|---|---|---|---|
| 1989 | Scottish Open | (England) Jillian Wallwork | (Denmark) Jon Holst-Christensen (England) Gillian Gowers | 6–15, 11–15 | (silver) Runner-up |

=== IBF International ===
Men's singles
| Year | Tournament | Opponent | Score | Result |
|---|---|---|---|---|
| 1989 | Bermuda International | (England) Michael Adams | 12–15, 15–4, 15–11 | (gold) Winner |
| 1992 | Iceland International | (Iceland) Broddi Kristjánsson | 15–10, 6–15, 15–9 | (gold) Winner |

Men's doubles
| Year | Tournament | Partner | Opponent | Score | Result |
|---|---|---|---|---|---|
| 1985 | Bell's Open | (England) Richard Outterside | (Scotland) Billy Gilliland (Scotland) Dan Travers | 7–15, 7–15 | (silver) Runner-up |
| 1987 | Bell's Open | (England) Richard Outterside | (England) Andy Goode (England) Miles Johnson | 15–6, 15–13 | (gold) Winner |
| 1987 | Welsh International | (England) Richard Outterside | (England) Martin Dew (England) Andy Goode | 6–15, 15–3, 15–12 | (gold) Winner |
| 1989 | Bermuda International | (England) Michael Adams | (England) Darrin Cowell (Bermuda) Ian Cummings | 15–4, 15–5 | (gold) Winner |
| 1989 | Bell's Open | (England) Andy Goode | (England) Andrew Fairhurst (England) Chris Hunt | 15–17, 15–10, 13–18 | (silver) Runner-up |
| 1990 | Irish International | (England) Chris Hunt | (Soviet Union) Andrey Antropov (Soviet Union) Sergey Melnikov | 15–4, 15–5 | (gold) Winner |

Mixed doubles
| Year | Tournament | Partner | Opponent | Score | Result |
|---|---|---|---|---|---|
| 1985 | Bell's Open | (England) Sara Halsall | (England) Richard Outterside (England) Wendy Poulton | 17–15, 15–6 | (gold) Winner |
| 1987 | Bell's Open | (England) Sara Halsall | (England) Andy Goode (England) Fiona Elliott | 15–9, 15–11 | (gold) Winner |
| 1988 | Bell's Open | (England) Jillian Wallwork | (England) Andy Goode (England) Gillian Gowers | 4–15, 7–15 | (silver) Runner-up |
| 1988 | Welsh International | (England) Jillian Wallwork | (England) Nick Ponting (Denmark) Anne Mette Bille | 15–12, 15–6 | (gold) Winner |
| 1989 | Bermuda International | (Barbados) Lenora Headley | (England) Michael Adams (Bermuda) Penny Roberts | 15–12, 15–1 | (gold) Winner |
| 1989 | Welsh International | (England) Jillian Wallwork | (England) Dave Wright (England) Claire Palmer | 11–15, 6–15 | (silver) Runner-up |
| 1992 | Iceland International | (Iceland) Ása Pálsdóttir | (Scotland) Kenny Middlemiss (Scotland) Elinor Middlemiss | 9–15, 9–15 | (silver) Runner-up |
