= Fiona Smith (badminton) =

English badminton player

Personal information
- Born: Fiona Elliott; 13 November 1963 (age 62) Farnborough, Hampshire, England
- Height: 5 ft 5 in (165 cm)
- Weight: 8 st 12 lb (124 lb; 56 kg)

Sport
- Country: England
- Sport: Badminton
- Handedness: Right
- Highest ranking: 6
Medal record
Women's badminton
Representing England
Commonwealth Games
Gold medal – first place	1986 Edinburgh	Mixed team
Gold medal – first place	1990 Auckland	Women's singles
Gold medal – first place	1990 Auckland	Women's doubles
Gold medal – first place	1990 Auckland	Mixed team
Silver medal – second place	1986 Edinburgh	Women's singles
Silver medal – second place	1986 Edinburgh	Mixed doubles
Bronze medal – third place	1986 Edinburgh	Women's doubles
European Championships
Silver medal – second place	1990 Moscow	Women's singles
European Mixed Team Championships
Bronze medal – third place	1990 Moscow	Mixed team
European Junior Championships
Silver medal – second place	1981 Edinburgh	Mixed team
Bronze medal – third place	1981 Edinburgh	Mixed doubles

Fiona Smith (born Fiona Elliott, 13 November 1963) is an English former badminton player.

== Badminton career ==
Smith is six times English National singles champion and a mixed doubles champion.

She represented England and won four medals. A gold medal in the team event, a silver medal singles and mixed doubles and a bronze medal in the women's doubles, at the 1986 Commonwealth Games in Edinburgh, Scotland.

Four years later she won three further medals (all gold) playing under her married name of Fiona Smith. The gold medals came in the singles, doubles and team event.

In addition to her National and Commonwealth Games successes she was a silver medalist at the 1990 European Championships in Moscow and has over 75 caps for England.

== Achievements ==
=== Commonwealth Games ===
Women's singles
Year	Venue	Opponent	Score	Result
1986	Meadowbank Sports Centre, Edinburgh, Scotland	(England) Helen Troke	4–11, 4–11	Silver
1990	Auckland Badminton Hall, Auckland, New Zealand	(Canada) Denyse Julien	11–7, 12–9	Gold

Women's doubles
Year	Venue	Partner	Opponent	Score	Result
1986	Meadowbank Sports Centre, Edinburgh, Scotland	(England) Helen Troke	(Canada) Claire Backhouse-Sharpe (Canada) Linda Cloutier	15–8, 15–11	Bronze
1990	Auckland Badminton Hall, Auckland, New Zealand	(England) Sara Sankey	(England) Gillian Clark (England) Gillian Gowers	18–14, 2–15, 15–9	Gold

Mixed doubles
Year	Venue	Partner	Opponent	Score	Result
1986	Meadowbank Sports Centre; Edinburgh, Scotland	(England) Andy Goode	(Australia) Michael Scandolera (Australia) Audrey Tuckey	7–15, 5–15	Silver

=== European Championships ===
Women's singles
Year	Venue	Opponent	Score	Result
1990	Luzhniki Small Sports Arena, Moscow, Soviet Union	(Denmark) Pernille Nedergaard	11–5, 11–12, 0–4 retired	Silver

=== European Junior Championships ===
Mixed doubles
Year	Venue	Partner	Opponent	Score	Result
1981	Meadowbank Sports Centre, Edinburgh, Scotland	(England) Steve Butler	(England) Dipak Tailor (England) Mary Leeves	2–15, 6–15	Bronze

=== IBF World Grand Prix (7 titles, 8 runners-up) ===
The World Badminton Grand Prix was sanctioned by the International Badminton Federation (IBF) from 1983 to 2006.

Women's singles
Year	Tournament	Opponent	Score	Result
1985	Carlton Intersport-Cup	(England) Allison Fisher	3–11, 4–11	(silver) Runner-up
1987	Carlton Intersport-Cup	(Denmark) Charlotte Hattens	12–9, 12–10	(gold) Winner
1987	Scottish Open	(Denmark) Charlotte Hattens	11–5, 5–11, 11–4	(gold) Winner
1988	Dutch Open	(Netherlands) Astrid van der Knaap	10–12, 12–11, 11–1	(gold) Winner
1988	Scottish Open	(Sweden) Christine Magnusson	9–11, 10–12	(silver) Runner-up

Women's doubles

Year	Partner	Tournament	Opponent	Score	Result
1985	Carlton Intersport-Cup	(England) Alison Fisher	(England) Wendy Poulton (England) Jane Shipman	16–18, 10–15	(silver) Runner-up
1987	Carlton-Intersport Cup	(England) Sara Sankey	(Canada) Johanne Falardeau (Canada) Denyse Julien	7–15, 15–6, 15–2	(gold) Winner
1987	Scottish Open	(England) Fiona Smith	(England) Gillian Gowers (England) Helen Troke	15–11, 3–15, 12–15	(silver) Runner-up

Mixed doubles

Year	Partner	Tournament	Opponent	Score	Result
1985	Carlton Intersport-Cup	(England) Richard Outterside	(England) Miles Johnson (England) Jane Shipman	15–12, 15–8	(gold) Winner
1986	Dutch Open	(England) Andy Goode	(England) Anders Nielsen (England) Gillian Gowers	15–8, 10–15, 15–5	(gold) Winner
1986	Hong Kong Open	(England) Andy Goode	(Scotland) Billy Gilliland (England) Nora Perry	5–15, 3–15	(silver) Runner-up
1986	Scottish Open	(England) Andy Goode	(Denmark) Jesper Knudsen (Denmark) Nettie Nielsen	9–15, 15–3, 15–8	(gold) Winner
1987	Poona Open	(England) Andy Goode	(England) Martin Dew (England) Gillian Gilks	14–18, 14–18	(silver) Runner-up
1987	Carlton-Intersport-Cup	(England) Andy Goode	(Denmark) Henrik Svarrer (Denmark) Dorte Kjær	17–16, 9–15, 10–15	(silver) Runner-up
1992	Finnish Open	(Denmark) Jan Paulsen	(Denmark) Max Gandrup (Denmark) Marlene Thomsen	15–17, 15–8, 12–15	(silver) Runner-up

=== IBF International (16 titles, 9 runners-up) ===
Women's singles
Year	Tournament	Opponent	Score	Result
1983	Welsh International	(England) Karen Beckman	3–11, 3–11	(silver) Runner-up
1984	Portugal International	(Sweden) Eva Stuart	11–7, 11–6	(gold) Winner
1984	Bell's Open	(Scotland) Gillian Martin	9–11, 5–11	(silver) Runner-up
1985	Irish Open	(England) Alison Fisher	7–11, 11–6, 11–3	(gold) Winner
1985	Bell's Open	(England) Karen Beckman	5–11, 4–11	(silver) Runner-up
1985	Welsh International	(Scotland) Jennifer Allen	11–4, 11–7	(gold) Winner
1986	Bell's Open	(England) Caroline Gay	12–10, 7–11, 7–11	(silver) Runner-up
1986	Welsh International	(South Korea) Nah Kyang-ah	11–1, 11–1	(gold) Winner
1987	Bell's Open	(England) Helen Troke	11–4, 12–10	(gold) Winner
1988	Bell's Open	(Canada) Denyse Julien	3–11, 10–12	(silver) Runner-up
1989	Bell's Open	(Canada) Denyse Julien	11–4, 1–11, 12–9	(gold) Winner
1991	Irish Open	(Canada) Doris Piché	10–12, 12–11, 11–3	(gold) Winner
1991	Welsh International	(England) Joanne Muggeridge	4–11, 12–10, 12–11	(gold) Winner
1992	Wimbledon Open	(South Korea) Ra Kyung-min	11–2, 8–11, 11–4	(gold) Winner

Women's doubles

Year	Partner	Tournament	Opponent	Score	Result
1983	Irish Open	(England) Jill Pringle	(Scotland) Pamela Hamilton (Scotland) Christine Heatly	15–13, 15–8	(gold) Winner
1984	Portugal International	(Sweden) Eva Stuart	(Denmark) Gitte Rygaard (Denmark) B. Lund	15–9, 15–4	(gold) Winner
1985	Irish Open	(England) Alison Fisher	(Scotland) Elinor Allen (Scotland) Pamela Hamilton	18–16, 15–1	(gold) Winner
1985	Bell's Open	(England) Lisa Chapman	(England) Karen Beckman (England) Sara Sankey	9–15, 6–15	(silver) Runner-up
1986	Bell's Open	(England) Helen Troke	(England) Karen Beckman (England) Sara Sankey	0–15, 9–15	(silver) Runner-up
1987	Bell's Open	(England) Sara Sankey	(Canada) Johanne Falardeau (Canada) Denyse Julien	15–9, 15–10	(gold) Winner
1987	Welsh International	(England) Sara Sankey	(England) Gillian Gowers (England) Helen Troke	7–15, 15–4, 15–3	(gold) Winner

Mixed doubles

Year	Partner	Tournament	Opponent	Score	Result
1984	Portugal International	(England) Gerry Asquith	(England) David Eddy (Sweden) Eva Stuart	15–12, 9–15, 15–3	(gold) Winner
1986	Bell's Open	(England) Andy Goode	(Scotland) Billy Gilliland (England) Helen Troke	4–15, 15–11, 17–15	(gold) Winner
1987	Bell's Open	(England) Andy Goode	(England) Mike Brown (England) Sara Sankey	9–15, 11–15	(silver) Runner-up
1987	Welsh International	(England) Andy Goode	(England) Martin Dew (England) Gillian Gilks	4–15, 8–15	(silver) Runner-up

== Personal life ==
She gave birth to her son Oli on 4 March 1991. She was coached and trained by her brother Mark Elliott (England Junior International and Surrey County stalwart).
