= Dan Travers =

British badminton player (born 1956)

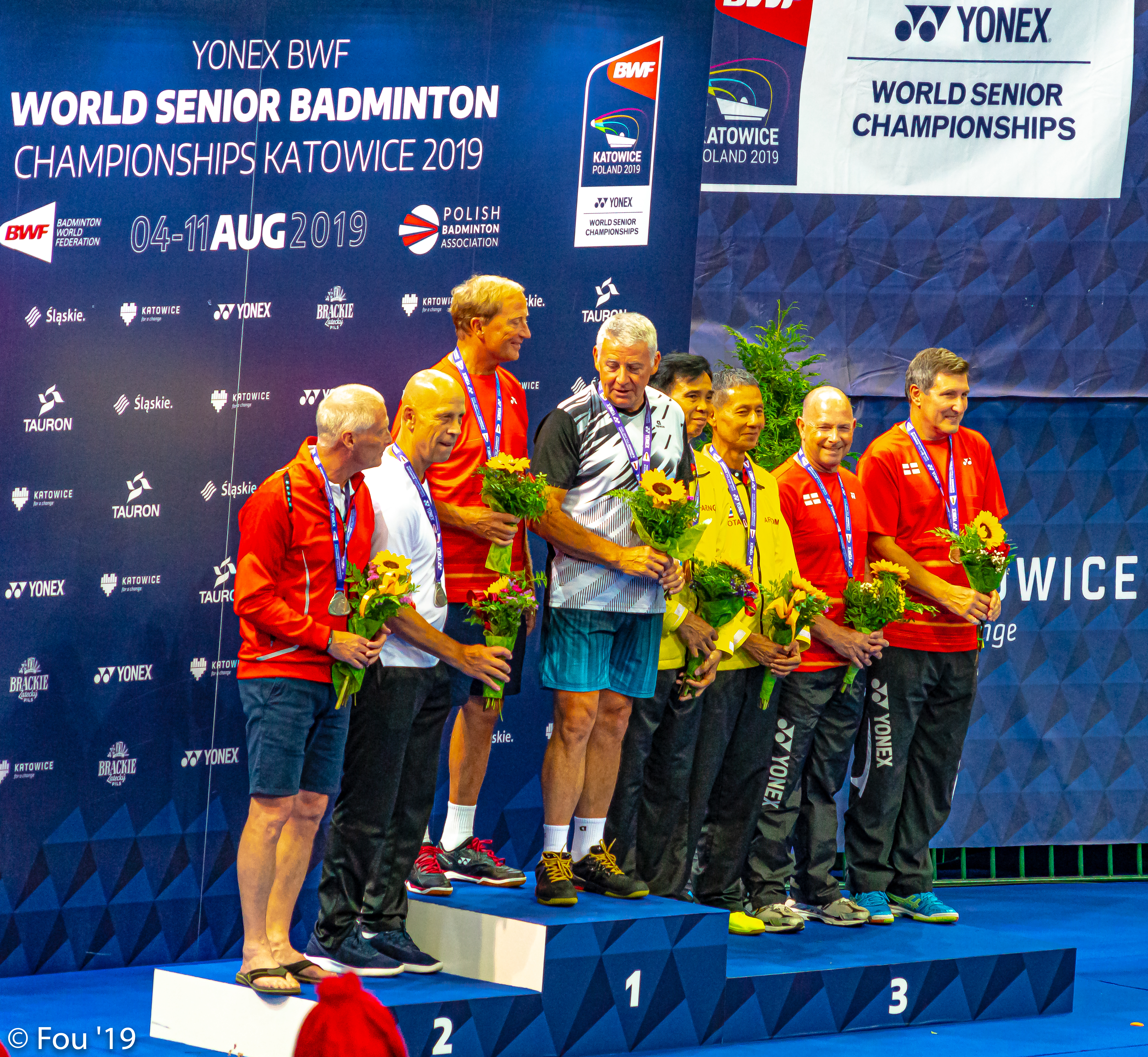

Personal information
- Nationality: British (Scottish)
- Born: 16 June 1956 (age 70) Scotland
- Spouse: Aileen Travers

Sport
- Sport: Badminton
- Handedness: Right

Doubles
- Highest ranking: 2 (with Billy Gilliland) (1982)
- BWF profile
Medal record
Men's badminton
Representing Great Britain
World Games
Bronze medal – third place	1981 Santa Clara	Men's doubles
Representing Scotland
World Senior Championships
Gold medal – first place	2025 Pattaya	Mixed doubles 65+
Commonwealth Games
Gold medal – first place	1986 Edinburgh	Men's doubles
European Championships
Bronze medal – third place	1984 Preston	Men's doubles

Daniel Travers (born 16 June 1956) is a former badminton player and national coach for Scotland, who competed at the Commonwealth Games and won a medal at the European Championships.

== Biography ==
Travers was a bronze medalist at the 1981 World Games, losing out to Swedish pair in semifinals. Travers competed in three commonwealth games in 1978, 1986 & 1990. He was Commonwealth games champion of 1986 in men's doubles with Billy Gilliland, first ever player(s) in history of Scottish badminton to be a gold medalist. Until now, they remain only gold medalist from their country in badminton. They also reached career high of World no. 2 after their display at the All England in 1982.

At the 1986 Commonwealth Games, Travers was denied an almost certain team bronze medal when teammate Alison Fulton was carried off the court during the third match with Scotland leading Australia 2–0 at the time. Also in 1986, along with Billy Gilliland, they were awarded with BBC Scotland Sportsperson of the year.

He became National coach of Scotland in 1997 and later president of Badminton Scotland and has coached players at many Commonwealth games & other championships, even playing competitive sport himself at the senior level. He is a numerous time European Senior Champion and World Senior Champion as well.

Travers married fellow Scottish international Aileen Nairn.

== Achievements ==
=== World Games ===
Men's doubles
Year	Venue	Partner	Opponent	Score	Result
1981	San Jose Civic Auditorium; California, United States	(United Kingdom) Billy Gilliland	(Sweden) Thomas Kihlström (Sweden) Stefan Karlsson	15–10, 0–15, 9–15	Bronze

=== World Senior Championships ===
Mixed doubles
Year	Age	Venue	Partner	Opponent	Score	Result	Ref.
2025	65+	Eastern National Sports Training Centre; Pattaya, Thailand	(Scotland) Christine Black	(Denmark) Birger Steenberg (Poland) Maria Brzeznicka	21–14, 18–21, 21–15	Gold	

=== Commonwealth Games ===
Men's doubles
Year	Venue	Partner	Opponent	Score	Result
1986	Meadowbank Sports Centre; Edinburgh, Scotland	(Scotland) Billy Gilliland	(England) Andy Goode (England) Nigel Tier	15–8, 15–5	Gold

=== European Championships ===
Men's doubles
Year	Venue	Partner	Opponent	Score	Result
1984	Guild Hall, Preston, England	(Scotland) Billy Gilliland	(Denmark) Morten Frost (Denmark) Jens Peter Nierhoff	13–15, 14–18	Bronze

=== IBF World Grand Prix ===
The World Badminton Grand Prix sanctioned by International Badminton Federation (IBF) from 1983 to 2006.

Men's doubles
Year	Tournament	Partner	Opponent	Score	Result
1984	Canada Open	(Scotland) Billy Gilliland	(Malaysia) Razif Sidek (Malaysia) Jalani Sidek	11–15, 9–15	(silver) Runner-up
1985	Canada Open	(Scotland) Billy Gilliland	(Denmark) Jens Peter Nierhoff (Denmark) Henrik Svarrer	12–15, 11–15	(silver) Runner-up
1985	Scottish Open	(Scotland) Billy Gilliland	(Denmark) Michael Kjeldsen (Denmark) Mark Christiansen	2–15, 4–15	(silver) Runner-up
1986	Dutch Open	(Scotland) Billy Gilliland	(China) He Xiangyang (China) Tang Hai	13–18, 9–15	(silver) Runner-up
1986	Scottish Open	(Scotland) Billy Gilliland	(Denmark) Jesper Knudsen (Denmark) Henrik Svarrer	10–15, 10–15	(silver) Runner-up

=== Open tournaments ===
Men's singles
Year	Tournament	Opponent	Score	Result
1980	Irish Open	(Republic of Ireland) Bill Thompson	–, –	(gold) Winner

Men's doubles
Year	Tournament	Partner	Opponent	Score	Result
1980	Irish Open	(Scotland) Gordon Hamilton	(Republic of Ireland) Frazer Evans (Republic of Ireland) Brian McKee	–, –	(gold) Winner
1980	Welsh Open	(Scotland) Billy Gilliland	(England) Ray Stevens (England) Mike Tredgett	15–7, 11–15, 6–15	(silver) Runner-up
1980	Bells Open	(Scotland) Billy Gilliland	(England) Ray Stevens (England) Steve Baddeley	9–15, 9–15	(silver) Runner-up
1981	Bells Open	(Scotland) Billy Gilliland	(England) Duncan Bridge (England) Martin Dew	18–17, 15–12	(gold) Winner
1981	Dutch Open	(Scotland) Billy Gilliland	(England) Andy Goode (England) Mike Tredgett	15–5, 15–8	(gold) Winner
1982	Victor Cup	(Scotland) Billy Gilliland	(England) Martin Dew (England) Mike Tredgett	3–15, 2–15	(silver) Runner-up
1982	Scottish Open	(Scotland) Billy Gilliland	(England) Donald Burden (England) Mark Elliott	15–10, 15–10	(gold) Winner
1982	Canada Open	(Scotland) Billy Gilliland	(Sweden) Lars Wengberg (Sweden) Torbjörn Petersson	5–15, 13–15	(silver) Runner-up
1982	All England Open	(Scotland) Billy Gilliland	(Malaysia) Jalani Sidek (Malaysia) Razif Sidek	15–8, 9–15, 10–15	(silver) Runner-up
1982	Irish Open	(Scotland) Billy Gilliland	(Netherlands) Ed Romejin (Netherlands) Bas von Barnau Sijthoff	15–7, 15–8	(gold) Winner
1982	Portugal Open	(Scotland) Billy Gilliland	(England) Darren Hall (England) Ray Stevens	13–15, 8–15	(silver) Runner-up
1982	Dutch Open	(Scotland) Billy Gilliland	(England) Martin Dew (England) Mike Tredgett	15–11, 5–15, 15–17	(silver) Runner-up

Mixed doubles
Year	Tournament	Partner	Opponent	Score	Result
1980	Irish Open	(Scotland) Christine Heatly	(Republic of Ireland) Frazer Evans (Republic of Ireland) Diane Underwood	–, –	(silver) Runner-up

=== IBF International ===
Men's singles
Year	Tournament	Opponent	Score	Result
1985	Bells Open	(England) Glen Milton	9–15, 4–15	(silver) Runner-up
1986	Irish International	(Scotland) Alex White	10–15, 14–15	(silver) Runner-up

Men's doubles
Year	Tournament	Partner	Opponent	Score	Result
1983	Irish International	(Scotland) Billy Gilliland	(Republic of Ireland) Barry Coffey (Republic of Ireland) John McArdle	15–2, 15–4	(gold) Winner
1983	Scottish International	(Scotland) Billy Gilliland	(England) Gerry Asquith (England) Andy Goode	15–6, 15–7	(gold) Winner
1984	Bells Open	(Scotland) Billy Gilliland	(Indonesia) Bobby Ertanto (Indonesia) Hafid Yusuf	15–8, 15–5	(gold) Winner
1984	Welsh International	(Scotland) Billy Gilliland	(England) Martin Dew (Denmark) Morten Frost	15–8, 18–15	(gold) Winner
1985	Irish International	(Scotland) Billy Gilliland	(England) Mark Elliott (England) Gary Scott	15–3, 18–14	(gold) Winner
1985	Bells Open	(Scotland) Billy Gilliland	(England) Mike Brown (England) Richard Outterside	15–7, 15–7	(gold) Winner
1986	Bells Open	(Scotland) Billy Gilliland	(England) Andy Goode (England) Miles Johnson	15–12, 18–14	(gold) Winner
1986	Irish International	(Scotland) Alex White	(England) Miles Johnson (England) Andy Salvidge	18–15, 15–8	(gold) Winner
1987	Irish International	(Scotland) Billy Gilliland	(Scotland) Iain Pringle (Scotland) Alex White	9–15, 15–12, 16–18	(silver) Runner-up
1988	Irish International	(Scotland) Anthony Gallagher	(Scotland) Iain Pringle (Scotland) Alex White	7–15, 8–15	(silver) Runner-up
1989	Irish International	(Scotland) Kenny Middlemiss	(Scotland) Anthony Gallagher (Scotland) Russell Hogg	15–6, 15–6	(gold) Winner

Mixed doubles
Year	Tournament	Partner	Opponent	Score	Result
1983	Irish International	(Scotland) Pamela Hamilton	(Scotland) Billy Gilliland (Scotland) Christine Heatly	5–15, 12–15	(silver) Runner-up
1985	Irish International	(Scotland) Pamela Hamilton	(Scotland) Billy Gilliland (Scotland) Elinor Allen	16–17, 13–15	(silver) Runner-up
1986	Irish International	(Scotland) Morag McKay	(England) Miles Johnson (England) Caroline Gay	15–10, 15–7	(gold) Winner
