= Andy Goode (badminton) =

English badminton player

Personal information
- Born: Andrew Brian Goode; 30 January 1960 (age 66) Welwyn Garden City, Hertfordshire, England
- Height: 1.83 m (6 ft 0 in)

Sport
- Country: England
- Sport: Badminton
- Handedness: Right
- BWF profile
Medal record
Men's badminton
Representing England
World Cup
Bronze medal – third place	1988 Bangkok	Mixed doubles
Thomas Cup
Bronze medal – third place	1982 London	Men's team
Bronze medal – third place	1984 Kuala Lumpur	Men's team
Commonwealth Games
Gold medal – first place	1986 Edinburgh	Mixed team
Gold medal – first place	1990 Auckland	Mixed team
Silver medal – second place	1986 Edinburgh	Mixed doubles
Silver medal – second place	1986 Edinburgh	Men's doubles
Bronze medal – third place	1990 Auckland	Mixed doubles
European Championships
Gold medal – first place	1982 Böblingen	Mixed team
Bronze medal – third place	1982 Böblingen	Men's doubles
Bronze medal – third place	1992 Glasgow	Mixed team
European Junior Championships
Gold medal – first place	1977 Ta' Qali	Boys' singles
Gold medal – first place	1977 Ta' Qali	Mixed team

Andrew Brian Goode (born 30 January 1960) is an English retired badminton player.

== Career ==
At the age of 17, Goode won the boys' singles at the 1977 European Junior Championships, and was part of the English winning team at that competition.

Goode represented England and won a gold medal in the team event and two silver medals in the men's and mixed doubles, at the 1986 Commonwealth Games in Edinburgh, Scotland.

In 1990, Goode who won the men's and mixed doubles title at the National Championships, had been left out of the England team for the European Championships in Moscow. He later won two more medals in the team event and mixed doubles at the 1990 Commonwealth Games in Auckland, New Zealand.

He also competed for Great Britain in the 1992 Summer Olympics. Goode won nine titles at the English National Badminton Championships (1 singles, 5 men's doubles and 3 mixed doubles).

== Personal life ==
He married Joanne Wright, an English badminton player who was five times National doubles champion. They have three children.

== Achievements ==
=== World Cup ===
Mixed doubles
Year	Venue	Partner	Opponent	Score	Result
1988	National Stadium, Bangkok, Thailand	(England) Gillian Gowers	(China) Wang Pengren (China) Shi Fangjing	6–15, 12–15	Bronze

=== Commonwealth Games ===
Men's doubles
Year	Venue	Partner	Opponent	Score	Result
1986	Meadowbank Sports Centre; Edinburgh, Scotland	(England) Nigel Tier	(Scotland) Billy Gilliland (Scotland) Dan Travers	8–15, 5–15	Silver

Mixed doubles
Year	Venue	Partner	Opponent	Score	Result
1986	Meadowbank Sports Centre; Edinburgh, Scotland	(England) Fiona Elliott	(Australia) Michael Scandolera (Australia) Audrey Tuckey	7–15, 5–15	Silver
1990	Auckland Badminton Hall; Auckland, New Zealand	(England) Gillian Clark	(England) Steve Baddeley (England) Gillian Gowers	Walkover	Bronze

=== European Championships ===
Men's doubles
Year	Venue	Partner	Opponent	Score	Result
1982	Sporthalle; Böblingen, West Germany	(England) Ray Stevens	(Sweden) Stefan Karlsson (Sweden) Thomas Kihlström	8–15, 4–15	Bronze

=== European Junior Championships ===
Boys' singles
Year	Venue	Opponent	Score	Result
1977	RAF Ta Kali hangar, Ta' Qali, Malta	(England) Kevin Jolly	Walkover	Gold

=== IBF World Grand Prix ===
The World Badminton Grand Prix sanctioned by International Badminton Federation (IBF) since 1983.

Men's doubles
Year	Tournament	Partner	Opponent	Score	Result
1985	English Masters	(England) Nigel Tier	(China) Chen Kang (China) Zhang Qingwu	15–7, 15–9	(gold) Winner
1991	Swiss Open	(England) Chris Hunt	(Sweden) Pär-Gunnar Jönsson (Sweden) Stellan Österberg	10–15, 14–18	(silver) Runner-up

Mixed doubles
Year	Tournament	Partner	Opponent	Score	Result
1986	Dutch Open	(England) Fiona Elliott	(England) Anders Nielsen (England) Gillian Gowers	15–8, 10–15, 15–5	(gold) Winner
1986	Hong Kong Open	(England) Fiona Elliott	(Scotland) Billy Gilliland (England) Nora Perry	5–15, 3–15	(silver) Runner-up
1986	Scottish Open	(England) Fiona Elliott	(Denmark) Jesper Knudsen (Denmark) Nettie Nielsen	9–15, 15–3, 15–8	(gold) Winner
1987	Poona Open	(England) Fiona Elliott	(England) Martin Dew (England) Gillian Gilks	14–18, 14–18	(silver) Runner-up
1987	Carlton-Intersport-Cup	(England) Fiona Elliott	(Denmark) Henrik Svarrer (Denmark) Dorte Kjær	17–16, 9–15, 10–15	(silver) Runner-up
1987	Canadian Open	(England) Gillian Gowers	(South Korea) Lee Deuk-choon (South Korea) Chung So-young	3–15, 15–11, 15–5	(gold) Winner
1988	Chinese Taipei Open	(England) Gillian Gowers	(Sweden) Jan-Eric Antonsson (Sweden) Maria Bengtsson	15–7, 15–13	(gold) Winner
1988	Grand Prix Finals	(England) Gillian Gowers	(China) Wang Pengren (China) Shi Fangjing	6–15, 6–15	(silver) Runner-up

=== IBF International ===
Men's singles
Year	Tournament	Opponent	Score	Result
1983	Bell's Open	(England) Kevin Jolly	15–9, 18–14	(gold) Winner

Men's doubles
Year	Tournament	Partner	Opponent	Score	Result
1983	Scottish Open	(England) Gerry Asquith	(Scotland) Billy Gilliland (Scotland) Dan Travers	5–15, 7–15	(silver) Runner-up
1983	Bell's Open	(England) Darrell Roebuck	(England) Nigel Tier (England) Duncan Bridge	8–15, 2–15	(silver) Runner-up
1984	Victor Cup	(England) Nigel Tier	(England) Dipak Tailor (England) Chris Dobson	11–15, 12–15	(silver) Runner-up
1984	Scottish Open	(England) Nigel Tier	(Denmark) Morten Frost (Denmark) Jens Peter Nierhoff	15–12, 8–15, 15–9	(gold) Winner
1986	Bell's Open	(England) Miles Johnson	(Scotland) Billy Gilliland (Scotland) Dan Travers	12–15, 14–18	(silver) Runner-up
1987	Swiss Open	(Scotland) Billy Gilliland	(Netherlands) Alex Meijer (Netherlands) Pierre Pelupessy	15–4, 15–6	(gold) Winner
1987	Bell's Open	(England) Miles Johnson	(England) Mike Brown (England) Richard Outterside	6–15, 13–15	(silver) Runner-up
1988	Bell's Open	(England) Miles Johnson	(England) Nick Ponting (England) Dave Wright	7–15, 7–15	(silver) Runner-up
1989	Bell's Open	(England) Mike Brown	(England) Andrew Fairhurst (England) Chris Hunt	15–17, 15–10, 13–18	(silver) Runner-up
1991	Portugal International	(England) Glen Milton	(England) Chris Hunt (England) Simon Archer	15–7, 2–15, 15–10	(gold) Winner
1991	Wimbledon Open	(England) Chris Hunt	(England) Nick Ponting (England) Dave Wright	4–15, 10–15	(silver) Runner-up
1991	Irish International	(England) Chris Hunt	(England) Nick Ponting (England) Dave Wright	5–15, 2–15	(silver) Runner-up
1991	Spanish International	(England) Chris Hunt	(Portugal) Ricardo Fernandes (Portugal) Fernando Silva	15–4, 15–3	(gold) Winner
1992	Austrian International	(England) Chris Hunt	(Germany) Michael Keck (Germany) Robert Neumann	15–5, 15–10	(gold) Winner
1992	Portugal International	(England) Chris Hunt	(Commonwealth of Independent States) Andrey Antropov (Commonwealth of Independent States) Nikolai Zuyev	15–11, 15–12	(gold) Winner
1992	Wimbledon Open	(England) Chris Hunt	(England) Nick Ponting (England) Dave Wright	8–15, 4–15	(silver) Runner-up

Mixed doubles
Year	Tournament	Partner	Opponent	Score	Result
1986	Bell's Open	(England) Fiona Elliott	(Scotland) Billy Gilliland (England) Helen Troke	4–15, 15–11, 17–15	(gold) Winner
1987	Bell's Open	(England) Fiona Elliott	(England) Mike Brown (England) Sara Halsall	9–15, 11–15	(silver) Runner-up
1988	Bell's Open	(England) Gillian Gowers	(England) Mike Brown (England) Jillian Wallwork	15–4, 15–7	(gold) Winner
1989	Bell's Open	(England) Karen Chapman	(England) Miles Johnson (England) Cheryl Johnson	15–5, 15–8	(gold) Winner
1991	French Open	(England) Cheryl Johnson	(Germany) Michael Keck (Germany) Anne-Katrin Seid	12–15, 7–15	(silver) Runner-up
1991	Portugal International	(England) Heidi Bender	(England) Chris Hunt (England) Tracy Dineen	10–15, 15–2, 12–15	(silver) Runner-up
1991	Wimbledon Open	(England) Gillian Gowers	(Soviet Union) Andrey Antropov (Soviet Union) Irina Serova	15–4, 15–0	(gold) Winner
1991	Welsh International	(England) Joanne Wright	(England) Chris Hunt (England) Karen Chapman	18–17, 15–4	(gold) Winner
1991	Spanish International	(England) Gillian Clark	(Spain) David Serrano (Spain) Esther Sanz	15–7, 15–3	(gold) Winner
1992	Portugal International	(England) Joanne Wright	(Commonwealth of Independent States) Nikolai Zuyev (Commonwealth of Independent States) Marina Andrievskaya	15–3, 15–10	(gold) Winner

=== International Tournament ===
Men's singles
Year	Tournament	Opponent	Score	Result
1979	Scottish Open	(England) David Hunt	15–11, 15–7	(gold) Winner
1979	French Open	(Germany) Roland Maywald		(gold) Winner
1981	Scottish Open	(England) Nick Yates	15–7, 11–15, 2–15	(gold) Winner
1981	Irish Open	(Netherlands) Rob Ridder	15–11, 15–12	(gold) Winner

Men's doubles
Year	Tournament	Partner	Opponent	Score	Result
1978	French Open	(New Zealand) Richard Purser	(Republic of Ireland) John Taylor (Republic of Ireland) Colin Bell		(gold) Winner
1981	Scottish Open	(England) Gary Scott	(Scotland) Billy Gilliland (Scotland) Dan Travers	3–15, 15–7, 18–16	(gold) Winner
1981	Irish Open	(England) Gary Scott	(England) Gerry Asquith (England) Dipak Tailor	9–15, 15–10, 15–4	(gold) Winner
1981	Dutch Open	(England) Mike Tredgett	(Scotland) Billy Gilliland (Scotland) Dan Travers	5–15, 8–15	(silver) Runner-up
1981	French Open	(England) Steve Baddeley	(England) Norman Goode (England) Nigel Tier		(gold) Winner

Mixed doubles
Year	Tournament	Partner	Opponent	Score	Result
1979	Czechoslovakian International	(England) Gillian Clark	(Denmark) Kenneth Larsen (Denmark) Charlotte Pilgaard	15–9, 15–6	(gold) Winner
1981	Irish Open	(England) Diane Simpson	(Netherlands) Rob Ridder (Netherlands) Marjan Ridder	17–18, 15–9, 9–15	(silver) Runner-up
