= Dave Wright (badminton) =

English badminton player

Personal information
- Born: David Wright; 10 April 1965 (age 61) Killamarsh, Derbyshire, England
- Height: 1.75 m (5 ft 9 in)
- Weight: 77 kg (170 lb)

Sport
- Country: England
- Sport: Badminton
- Handedness: Right
- Event: Men's & mixed doubles

Men's & mixed doubles
- BWF profile

David Wright (born 10 April 1965) is a former English badminton international player and two times English National doubles champion.

== Biography ==
Wright who represented Yorkshire became an English National doubles champion after winning the English National Badminton Championships men's doubles title with Nick Ponting in 1991. He then repeated the success two years in 1993 later but this time he partnered Julian Robertson.

Wright represented Great Britain at the 1992 Olympic Games playing in the men's doubles with Nick Ponting. In the first round they beat German pair Stefan Frey and Stephan Kuhl, but defeated in the second round to Indonesian pair Rexy Mainaky and Ricky Subagja.

== Achievements ==
=== IBF World Grand Prix ===
The World Badminton Grand Prix sanctioned by International Badminton Federation (IBF) since 1983.

Mixed doubles
Year	Tournament	Partner	Opponent	Score	Result
1992	Dutch Open	(England) Sara Sankey	(Denmark) Christian Jakobsen (Denmark) Marianne Rasmussen	5–15, 15–8, 15–12	(gold) Winner

=== IBF International ===
Men's doubles
Year	Tournament	Partner	Opponent	Score	Result
1988	Bell's Open	(England) Nick Ponting	(England) Andy Goode (England) Miles Johnson	15–7, 15–7	(gold) Winner
1988	Welsh International	(England) Nick Ponting	(England) Mike Adams (Wales) Chris Rees	15–3, 10–15, 15–8	(gold) Winner
1989	Welsh International	(England) Nick Ponting	(England) Miles Johnson (England) Andy Salvidge	15–11, 15–9	(gold) Winner
1990	Austrian International	(England) Nick Ponting	(Germany) Michael Keck (Germany) Kai Mitteldorf	15–3, 15–11	(gold) Winner
1990	Welsh International	(England) Nick Ponting	(Canada) Mike Bitten (Canada) Bryan Blanshard	15–5, 10–15, 15–10	(gold) Winner
1991	Wimbledon Open	(England) Nick Ponting	(England) Andy Goode (England) Chris Hunt	15–4, 15–10	(gold) Winner
1991	Irish International	(England) Nick Ponting	(England) Andy Goode (England) Chris Hunt	15–5, 15–2	(gold) Winner
1992	Wimbledon Open	(England) Nick Ponting	(England) Andy Goode (England) Chris Hunt	15–8, 15–4	(gold) Winner
1992	Welsh International	(England) Nick Ponting	(England) Michael Adams (Wales) Chris Rees	15–9, 15–2	(gold) Winner
1993	Iceland International	(England) Julian Robertson	(Iceland) Broddi Kristjánsson (Iceland) Oli Bjorn Zimsen	15–2, 15–4	(gold) Winner
1994	Mauritius International	(England) Michael Adams	(Malaysia) Teh Chong Chen (Malaysia) Wong Choong Hann	15–7, 15–7	(gold) Winner
1996	Mauritius International	(England) Nitin Panesar	(Malaysia) Mahathir Mustaffa (Malaysia) Jason Wong	15–6, 15–18, 15–9	(gold) Winner

Mixed doubles
Year	Tournament	Partner	Opponent	Score	Result
1989	Welsh International	(England) Claire Palmer	(England) Mike Brown (England) Jillian Wallwork	15–11, 15–6	(gold) Winner
1992	Wimbledon Open	(England) Sara Sankey	(England) Simon Archer (England) Joanne Davies	5–15, 15–12, 15–11	(gold) Winner
1993	Iceland International	(England) Lorraine Thomas	(England) Julian Robertson (England) Kerri McKittrick	15–5, 1–0 retired	(gold) Winner
1994	Mauritius International	(England) Karen Chapman	(England) Michael Adams (England) Joanne Davies	11–15, 9–15	(silver) Runner-up
1996	Mauritius International	(England) Lorraine Cole	(England) Carl Fenton (England) Justine Willmott	15–4, 15–4	(gold) Winner
