= Nick Ponting =

English badminton player

Personal information
- Full name: Nicholas Ponting
- Born: 13 June 1966 (age 60) London, England
- Height: 1.73 m (5 ft 8 in)

Sport
- Country: England
- Sport: Badminton
- Handedness: Right

Men's & mixed doubles
- Highest ranking: 1
- BWF profile
Medal record
Men's badminton
Representing England
World Championships
Bronze medal – third place	1993 Birmingham	Mixed doubles
World Cup
Bronze medal – third place	1993 New Delhi	Mixed doubles
Commonwealth Games
Gold medal – first place	1994 Victoria	Mixed team
Bronze medal – third place	1994 Victoria	Mixed doubles

Nicholas Ponting (born 13 September 1966) is a former professional badminton player from England.

== Early life ==
He grew up in Bishop's Cleeve. He attended Cleeve School and studied Maths at university.

== Career ==
=== Olympic Games ===
He was ranked No. 1 in the world at mixed doubles during 1993 and represented Great Britain at the 1992 and 1996 Olympic Games in Barcelona and Atlanta.

=== All England Open Badminton Championships ===
He won the mixed doubles event at the 1994 All England Open Badminton Championships with Joanne Wright.

=== World Championships ===
He won the bronze medal at the 1993 IBF World Championships in mixed doubles with Gillian Clark.

=== Commonwealth Games ===
He represented England and won a gold medal in the mixed team event and a bronze medal in the mixed doubles with Joanne Wright, at the 1994 Commonwealth Games in Victoria, British Columbia, Canada.

=== Masters ===
Ponting still plays competitive badminton and currently represents England on the International Masters circuit winning multiple National and All England Masters titles in singles, men's doubles and mixed doubles.

World Senior Championships and Senior European Championships Results:

- 2009 World Championships Punta Umbria Spain – Gold medal 40+ men's doubles (with Chris Hunt) and Gold medal 40+ mixed doubles (with Julie Bradbury)
- 2010 European Senior Championships Dundalk Ireland – Silver medal 40+ men's doubles (with Chris Hunt) and Gold medal 40+ mixed doubles (with Julie Bradbury)
- 2011 World Championships Richmond Vancouver Canada – Gold medal 40+ men's doubles (with Chris Hunt) and Gold medal 40+ mixed doubles (with Julie Bradbury)
- 2013 World Championships Ankara Turkey – Silver medal 35+ men's doubles (with Lee Clapham )and Gold medal 40+ mixed doubles (with Julie Bradbury)
- 2014 European Championships Portugal – Gold medal 45+ mixed doubles (with Julie Bradbury)
- 2016 European Championships Slovenia – Gold medal 40+ men's doubles ( with Dan Plant)
- 2017 World Championships Cochin, India – Gold medal 45+ mixed doubles (with Julie Bradbury)

== Achievements ==
=== World Championships ===
Mixed doubles
Year	Venue	Partner	Opponent	Score	Result
1993	National Indoor Arena, Birmingham, England	(England) Gillian Clark	(Denmark) Thomas Lund (Sweden) Catrine Bengtsson	8–15, 15–18	Bronze

=== World Cup ===
Mixed doubles
Year	Venue	Partner	Opponent	Score	Result
1993	Indira Gandhi Arena, New Delhi, India	(England) Gillian Clark	(Sweden) Peter Axelsson (England) Gillian Gowers	12–15, 11–15	Bronze

=== Commonwealth Games ===
Mixed doubles
Year	Venue	Partner	Opponent	Score	Result
1994	McKinnon Gym, Victoria, British Columbia, Canada	(England) Joanne Goode	(England) Simon Archer (England) Julie Bradbury	10–15, 12–15	Bronze

=== IBF World Grand Prix ===
The World Badminton Grand Prix has been sanctioned by the International Badminton Federation from 1983 to 2006.

Men's doubles
Year	Tournament	Partner	Opponent	Score	Result
1995	Scottish Open	(England) Julian Robertson	(Denmark) Jesper Larsen (Sweden) Stellan Österberg	15–5, 15–6	(gold) Winner
1996	Polish Open	(England) Julian Robertson	(China) Ge Cheng (China) Tao Xiaoqiang	15–9, 12–15, 10–15	(silver) Runner-up
1997	Dutch Open	(England) John Quinn	(Denmark) Jens Eriksen (Denmark) Jesper Larsen	15–7, 8–15, 6–15	(silver) Runner-up
1998	Polish Open	(England) Ian Pearson	(England) Julian Robertson (England) Nathan Robertson	15–2, 8–15, 3–15	(silver) Runner-up

Mixed doubles
Year	Tournament	Partner	Opponent	Score	Result
1989	Swiss Open	(England) Cheryl Johnson	(South Korea) Kim Moon-soo (South Korea) Chung So-young	15–18, 4–15	(silver) Runner-up
1991	Canada Open	(England) Gillian Gowers	(Sweden) Par-Gunnar Jonsson (Sweden) Maria Bengtsson	15–10, 15–17, 15–6	(gold) Winner
1991	U.S. Open	(England) Gillian Gowers	(South Korea) Lee Sang-bok (South Korea) Shim Eun-jung	14–18, 2–15	(silver) Runner-up
1993	Chinese Taipei Open	(England) Gillian Clark	(Indonesia) Denny Kantono (Indonesia) Zelin Resiana	walkover	(silver) Runner-up
1993	World Grand Prix Finals	(England) Gillian Clark	(Denmark) Thomas Lund (Sweden) Catrine Bengtsson	9–15, 7–15	(silver) Runner-up
1994	All England Open	(England) Joanne Goode	(England) Chris Hunt (England) Gillian Clark	15–10, 15–11	(gold) Winner
1994	Thailand Open	(England) Joanne Goode	(Indonesia) Tri Kusharjanto (Indonesia) Minarti Timur	10–15, 12–15	(silver) Runner-up
1996	Polish Open	(England) Joanne Goode	(China) Chen Xingdong (China) Peng Xinyong	15–10, 12–15, 8–15	(silver) Runner-up

=== IBF International ===
Men's doubles
Year	Tournament	Partner	Opponent	Score	Result
1988	Bell's Open	(England) Dave Wright	(England) Andy Goode (England) Miles Johnson	15–7, 15–7	(gold) Winner
1988	Welsh International	(England) Dave Wright	(England) Mike Adams (Wales) Chris Rees	15–3, 10–15, 15–8	(gold) Winner
1989	Welsh International	(England) Dave Wright	(England) Miles Johnson (England) Andy Salvidge	15–11, 15–9	(gold) Winner
1990	Austrian International	(England) Dave Wright	(Germany) Michael Keck (Germany) Kai Mitteldorf	15–3, 15–11	(gold) Winner
1990	Welsh International	(England) Dave Wright	(Canada) Mike Bitten (Canada) Bryan Blanshard	15–5, 10–15, 15–10	(gold) Winner
1991	Wimbledon Open	(England) Dave Wright	(England) Andy Goode (England) Chris Hunt	15–4, 15–10	(gold) Winner
1991	Irish International	(England) Dave Wright	(England) Andy Goode (England) Chris Hunt	15–5, 15–2	(gold) Winner
1992	Wimbledon Open	(England) Dave Wright	(England) Andy Goode (England) Chris Hunt	15–8, 15–4	(gold) Winner
1992	Welsh International	(England) Dave Wright	(England) Mike Adams (Wales) Chris Rees	15–9, 15–2	(gold) Winner
1993	Austrian International	(England) Simon Archer	(Netherlands) Edwin van Dalm (Netherlands) Quinten van Dalm	15–5, 15–5	(gold) Winner
1994	Welsh International	(England) Julian Robertson	(Russia) Andrey Antropov (Russia) Nikolai Zuyev	2–15, 6–15	(silver) Runner-up

Mixed doubles
Year	Tournament	Partner	Opponent	Score	Result
1988	Welsh International	(Denmark) Anne Mette Bille	(England) Mike Brown (England) Jillian Wallwork	12–15, 6–15	(silver) Runner-up
1990	Welsh International	(England) Joanne Goode	(Soviet Union) Vitali Shmakov (Soviet Union) Vlada Chernyavskaya	17–14, 7–15, 15–11	(gold) Winner
1991	Irish International	(England) Joanne Goode	(Germany) Michael Keck (Germany) Anne-Katrin Seid	15–10, 15–11	(gold) Winner
1992	Welsh International	(England) Joanne Goode	(Germany) Michael Keck (Germany) Karen Neumann	15–7, 18–16	(gold) Winner
1992	Irish International	(England) Joanne Davies	(Denmark) Lars Pedersen (Denmark) Anne Mette Bille	7–15, 11–15	(silver) Runner-up
1993	Austrian International	(England) Joanne Goode	(Austria) Heinz Fischer (Austria) Irina Serova	15–9, 15–7	(gold) Winner
1994	Welsh International	(England) Joanne Goode	(England) James Anderson (England) Emma Constable	18–15, 15–9	(gold) Winner
1996	Scottish Open	(England) Joanne Goode	(Sweden) Jens Olsson (Sweden) Astrid Crabo	12–15, 15–11, 8–15	(silver) Runner-up
