= Sara Sankey =

British badminton player

Sara Sankey (née Halsall)
Personal information
- Born: Sara Halsall; 29 September 1967 (age 59) Southport, England
- Height: 170 cm (5 ft 7 in)
- Weight: 68 kg (150 lb)

Sport
- Country: England
- Sport: Badminton
- Event: Women's & Mixed doubles
Medal record
Women's badminton
Representing England
World Cup
Silver medal – second place	1992 Guangzhou	Women's doubles
Commonwealth Games
Gold medal – first place	1990 Auckland	Women's doubles
Gold medal – first place	1990 Auckland	Mixed team
Gold medal – first place	1998 Kuala Lumpur	Women's team
Silver medal – second place	1990 Auckland	Mixed doubles
Bronze medal – third place	2002 Manchester	Mixed doubles
European Championships
Silver medal – second place	1986 Uppsala	Mixed team
Silver medal – second place	2002 Malmö	Mixed team
Bronze medal – third place	1986 Uppsala	Women's doubles
Bronze medal – third place	1992 Glasgow	Women's doubles
Bronze medal – third place	2002 Malmö	Women's doubles
Bronze medal – third place	1992 Glasgow	Mixed team
European Junior Championships
Silver medal – second place	1985 Pressbaum	Girls' doubles
Silver medal – second place	1985 Pressbaum	Mixed team

Sara Sankey (née Halsall, born 29 September 1967) is a retired English badminton player.

== Badminton career ==
In 1990, Sankey represented England when she attended the Commonwealth Games where she won gold medals in the mixed team event and with Fiona Smith in the women's doubles event. She also won a silver medal with Miles Johnson in the mixed doubles. She went on to win a gold medal at the 1998 Commonwealth Games in the women's team event and a bronze medal at the 2002 Commonwealth Games with Anthony Clark in the mixed doubles event.

Sankey represented Great Britain at the 1992 Olympics in the Women's Doubles event with Gillian Gowers.

She retired from playing badminton internationally in 2002 and began coaching with All Stars Elite Badminton Club.

== Achievements ==
=== World Cup ===
Women's doubles
Year	Venue	Partner	Opponent	Score	Result
1992	Guangdong Gymnasium, Guangzhou, China	(England) Gillian Gowers	(China) Lin Yanfen (China) Yao Fen	0–15, 3–15	Silver

=== Commonwealth Games ===
Women's doubles
Year	Venue	Partner	Opponent	Score	Result
1990	Auckland Badminton Hall, Auckland, New Zealand	(England) Fiona Smith	(England) Gillian Clark (England) Gillian Gowers	18–14, 2–15, 15–9	Gold

Mixed doubles
Year	Venue	Partner	Opponent	Score	Result
1990	Auckland Badminton Hall, Auckland, New Zealand	(England) Miles Johnson	(Hong Kong) Chan Chi Choi (Hong Kong) Amy Chan	7–15, 12–15	Silver
2002	Bolton Arena, Manchester, England	(England) Anthony Clark	(Malaysia) Chew Choon Eng (Malaysia) Chin Eei Hui	7–4, 7–3, 4–7, 4–7, 0–7	Bronze

=== European Championships ===
Women's doubles
Year	Venue	Partner	Opponent	Score	Result
1986	Fyrishallen, Uppsala, Sweden	(England) Karen Beckman	(Denmark) Dorte Kjær (Denmark) Nettie Nielsen	8–15, 4–15	Bronze
1992	Kelvin Hall, Glasgow, Scotland	(England) Gillian Gowers	(Sweden) Lim Xiaoqing (Sweden) Christine Magnusson	5–15, 15–17	Bronze
2002	Baltiska Hallen, Malmö, Sweden	(England) Ella Tripp	(Denmark) Ann-Lou Jørgensen (Denmark) Jane F. Bramsen	7–2, 4–7, 0–7, 0–7	Bronze

=== European Junior Championships ===
Girls' doubles
Year	Venue	Partner	Opponent	Score	Result
1985	Sacré Coeur Cloister Hall, Pressbaum, Austria	(England) Debbie Hore	(Denmark) Lotte Olsen (Denmark) Lisbet Stuer-Lauridsen	11–15, 15–9, 7–15	Silver

=== IBF World Grand Prix (7 titles, 5 runners-up) ===
The World Badminton Grand Prix was sanctioned by the International Badminton Federation (IBF) from 1983-2006.

Women's doubles
Year	Tournament	Partner	Opponent	Score	Result
1985	English Masters	(England) Karen Beckman	(England) Gillian Clark (England) Gillian Gowers	15–11, 15–5	(gold) Winner
1987	Dutch Open	(England) Gillian Clark	(Sweden) Maria Bengtsson (Sweden) Christine Magnusson	10–15, 4–15	(silver) Runner-up
1987	Carlton-Intersport Cup	(England) Fiona Smith	(Canada) Johanne Falardeau (Canada) Denyse Julien	7–15, 15–6, 15–2	(gold) Winner
1987	Scottish Open	(England) Fiona Smith	(England) Gillian Gowers (England) Helen Troke	15–11, 3–15, 12–15	(silver) Runner-up
1988	Dutch Open	(England) Gillian Clark	(Denmark) Dorte Kjær (Denmark) Nettie Nielsen	9–15, 15–9, 15–6	(gold) Winner
1988	English Masters	(England) Gillian Clark	(China) Lin Ying (China) Guan Weizhen	6–15, 8–15	(silver) Runner-up
1988	Scottish Open	(England) Gillian Clark	(Denmark) Dorte Kjær (Denmark) Gitte Paulsen	walkover	(gold) Winner
1989	Poona Open	(England) Gillian Clark	(Sweden) Maria Bengtsson (Sweden) Christine Magnusson	4–15, 15–13, 4–15	(silver) Runner-up
1989	Scottish Open	(England) Karen Chapman	(England) Gillian Clark (England) Gillian Gowers	10–15, 6–15	(silver) Runner-up
1991	Canada Open	(England) Gillian Gowers	(South Korea) Kang Bok-seung (South Korea) Shim Eun-jung	12–15, 15–12, 17–15	(gold) Winner
1991	Dutch Open	(England) Gillian Gowers	(Sweden) Catrine Bengtsson (Sweden) Maria Bengtsson	15–9, 18–16	(gold) Winner

Mixed doubles
Year	Tournament	Partner	Opponent	Score	Result
1992	Dutch Open	(England) Dave Wright	(Denmark) Christian Jakobsen (Denmark) Marianne Rasmussen	5–15, 15–8, 15–12	(gold) Winner

=== IBF International (19 titles, 3 runners-up) ===
Women's doubles
Year	Tournament	Partner	Opponent	Score	Result
1985	Welsh International	(England) Karen Beckman	(Denmark) Hanne Adsbøl (Denmark) Nettie Nielsen	15–7, 15–12	(gold) Winner
1985	Bell's Open	(England) Karen Beckman	(England) Lisa Chapman (England) Fiona Elliot	15–9, 15–6	(gold) Winner
1986	Welsh International	(England) Karen Beckman	(England) Lisa Chapman (England) Cheryl Cooke	15–10, 15–12	(gold) Winner
1986	Bell's Open	(England) Karen Beckman	(England) Fiona Elliot (England) Helen Troke	15–0, 15–9	(gold) Winner
1987	Bell's Open	(England) Fiona Elliot	(Canada) Johanne Falardeau (Canada) Denyse Julien	15–9, 15–10	(gold) Winner
1987	Irish Open	(England) Karen Beckman	(Scotland) Elinor Allen (Scotland) Jennifer Allen	15–6, 15–4	(gold) Winner
1988	Bell's Open	(England) Karen Beckman	(Canada) Denyse Julien (Canada) Claire Backhouse-Sharpe	12–15, 10–15	(silver) Runner-up
1989	Bell's Open	(England) Karen Chapman	(Scotland) Elinor Allen (Scotland) Jennifer Allen	18–15, 10–15, 15–4	(gold) Winner
1989	Welsh International	(England) Karen Chapman	(Soviet Union) Elena Rybkina (Soviet Union) Vlada Tcherniavskaia	15–12, 7–15, 15–2	(gold) Winner
1991	Wimbledon International	(England) Gillian Gowers	(England) Julie Bradbury (England) Gillian Clark	15–5, 10–15, 5–15	(silver) Runner-up
1992	Welsh International	(England) Julie Bradbury	(Germany) Anne-Katrin Seid (Germany) Nicole Baldewein	15–8, 15–1	(gold) Winner
1997	Welsh International	(England) Ella Tripp	(England) Lorraine Cole (England) Joanne Wright	15–5, 15–3	(gold) Winner
1997	Scottish Open	(England) Ella Tripp	(Scotland) Elinor Middlemiss (Scotland) Sandra Watt	15–13, 15–12	(gold) Winner
1997	French Open	(England) Ella Tripp	(Indonesia) Etty Tantri (Indonesia) Cynthia Tuwankotta	17–14, 3–15, 7–15	(silver) Runner-up
1999	Portugal International	(England) Ella Tripp	(Germany) Nicole Grether (Germany) Karen Neumann	15–12, 15–12	(gold) Winner
2000	Welsh International	(England) Ella Tripp	(England) Gail Emms (England) Joanne Wright	8–6, 7–4, 6–8 undisclosed	(gold) Winner
2001	Portugal International	(England) Ella Tripp	(Germany) Nicole Grether (Germany) Nicol Pitro	17–15, 13–15, 15–9	(gold) Winner
2001	Welsh International	(England) Ella Tripp	(England) Liza Parker (England) Suzanne Rayappan	7–5, 6–8, 7–4, 7–4	(gold) Winner

Mixed doubles
Year	Tournament	Partner	Opponent	Score	Result
1985	Bell's Open	(England) Mike Brown	(England) Richard Outterside (England) Wendy Poulton	17–15, 15–6	(gold) Winner
1987	Bell's Open	(England) Mike Brown	(England) Andy Goode (England) Fiona Elliot	15–9, 15–11	(gold) Winner
1992	Wimbledon International	(England) Dave Wright	(England) Simon Archer (England) Joanne Davies	5–15, 15–12, 15–11	(gold) Winner
1997	Welsh International	(England) James Anderson	(England) Ian Sullivan (England) Gail Emms	15–6, 17–14	(gold) Winner
