= Badminton at the 1990 Commonwealth Games =

- Venue: Auckland Badminton Hall, Epsom
- Location: Auckland, New Zealand
- Dates: 24 January - 3 February 1990

Badminton at the 1990 Commonwealth Games was the seventh appearance of the Badminton at the Commonwealth Games. Competition at the 1990 Commonwealth Games took place at the Auckland Badminton Hall at 99 Gillies Avenue in Epsom from 24 January until 3 February 1990.

England topped the badminton medal table by virtue of winning three gold medals. Steve Baddeley was forced to withdraw from the men's singles and mixed doubles bronze play off's due to severe blistering on his feet.

== Medal table ==
* Host nation (New Zealand)

Rank	Nation	Gold	Silver	Bronze	Total
1	England	3	2	3	8
2	Malaysia	2	2	0	4
3	Hong Kong	1	0	1	2
4	Canada	0	2	2	4
Totals (4 entries)		6	6	6	18

== Medallists ==
Category	Gold	Silver	Bronze
Men's singles	(Malaysia) Rashid Sidek	(Malaysia) Foo Kok Keong	(England) Darren Hall
Women's singles	(England) Fiona Smith	(Canada) Denyse Julien	(England) Helen Troke
Men's doubles	(Malaysia) Jalani Sidek & Razif Sidek	(Malaysia) Cheah Soon Kit & Rashid Sidek	(Canada) Bryan Blanshard & Mike Bitten
Women's doubles	(England) Fiona Smith & Sara Sankey	(England) Gillian Clark & Gillian Gowers	(Canada) Johanne Falardeau & Denyse Julien
Mixed doubles	(Hong Kong) Chan Chi Choi & Amy Chan	(England) Miles Johnson & Sara Sankey	(England) Andy Goode & Gillian Clark
Mixed team	England	Canada	Hong Kong

== Finals ==
Category	Winner	Runner-up	Score
Men's singles	(Malaysia) Rashid Sidek	(Malaysia) Foo Kok Keong	15–8, 15–10
Women's singles	(England) Fiona Smith	(Canada) Denyse Julien	11–7, 12-9
Men's doubles	(Malaysia) Jalani Sidek & Razif Sidek	(Malaysia) Cheah Soon Kit & Rashid Sidek	15–8, 15-8
Women's doubles	(England) Fiona Smith & Sara Sankey	(England) Gillian Clark & Gillian Gowers	18–14, 2–15, 15–9
Mixed doubles	(Hong Kong) Chan Chi Choi & Amy Chan	(England) Miles Johnson & Sara Sankey	15–7, 15-12
Mixed team	England	Canada	5-0

== Results ==
=== Men's singles ===
Round of 16
1	(Malaysia) Rashid Sidek	15	15
16	(Australia) Gordon Lang	1	4
8	(England) Steve Butler	15	15
9	(Hong Kong) Chan Kin Ngai	4	4
5	(England) Steve Baddeley	18	15
12	(India) U. Vimal Kumar	17	1
4	(Canada) David Humble	15	15
13	(Hong Kong) Ng Pak Kum	6	9
6	(Malaysia) Foo Kok Keong	15	15
11	(New Zealand) Kerrin Harrison	7	6
3	(Canada) Mike Butler	7	15	15
14	(England) Miles Johnson	15	2	1
7	(England) Darren Hall	15	15
10	(Hong Kong) Chan Siu Kwong	5	10
2	(Scotland) Ken Middlemiss	7	15	15
15	(New Zealand) Graeme Robson	15	12	5

Quarter-finals
(Malaysia) Sidek	17	15
(England) Butler	15	8
(England) Baddeley	15	18
(Canada) Humble	10	15
(Malaysia) Keong	15	15
(Canada) Butler	6	6
(England) Hall	15	15
(Scotland) Middlemiss	6	2

Semi-finals
(Malaysia) Sidek	15	15
(England) Baddeley	6	2
(Malaysia) Keong	15	15
(England) Hall	10	7

Final
(Malaysia) Sidek	15	15
(Malaysia) Keong	8	10
Third place
(England) Hall	w/o
(England) Baddeley	scr

=== Women's singles ===
Round of 16
1	(England) Fiona Smith	11	11
16	(Wales) Sarah Williams	1	1
8	(Hong Kong) Chan Man Wa	10	11	11
9	(Canada) Claire Sharpe	12	6	4
5	(India) Deepti Thanekar	12	4	12
12	(Canada) Toni Whittaker	11	11	10
4	(Canada) Doris Piché
13	(England) Gillian Clark
6	(Canada) Denyse Julien	11	11
11	(England) Sara Sankey	0	1
3	(Australia) Rhonda Cator	11	7	11
14	(New Zealand) Julie Still	6	11	3
7	(England) Helen Troke	8	11	11
10	(New Zealand) Lynne Horne	11	0	1
2	(India) Madhumita Bisht	11	11
15	(Hong Kong) Cheng Yin Sat	3	6

Quarter-finals
(England) Smith	11	11
(Hong Kong) Man Wa Chan	4	2
(India) Thanekar	11	11
(Canada) Piche	5	4
(Canada) Julien	11	11
(Australia) Cator	3	5
(England) Troke	11	4	11
(India) Bisht	5	11	6

Semi-finals
(England) Smith	11	11
(India) Thanekar	2	2
(Canada) Julien	11	11
(England) Troke	8	3

Final
(England) Smith	11	12
(Canada) Julien	7	9
Third place
(England) Troke	11	11
(India) Thanekar	0	0

=== Men's doubles ===
Quarterfinals
(Malaysia) Jalani Sidek (Malaysia) Razif Sidek	15	15
(New Zealand) Glenn Stewart (New Zealand) Graeme Robson	4	1
(Canada) Bryan Blanshard (Canada) Mike Bitten	18	15
(Hong Kong) Chan Chi Choi (Hong Kong) Chan Siu Kwong	14	4
(Malaysia) Cheah Soon Kit (Malaysia) Rashid Sidek	15	15
(Scotland) Dan Travers (Scotland) Alex White	7	2
(England) Andy Goode (England) Miles Johnson	15	15
(New Zealand) Kerrin Harrison (New Zealand) Phil Horne	5	2

Semifinals
(Malaysia) Sidek (Malaysia) Sidek	15	15
(Canada) Blanshard (Canada) Bitten	4	3
(Malaysia) Kit (Malaysia) Sidek	15	15
(England) Johnson (England) Goode	3	5

Finals
(Malaysia) Sidek (Malaysia) Sidek	15	15
(Malaysia) Kit (Malaysia) Sidek	8	8
Third place
(Canada) Bitten (Canada) Blanshard	15	15
(England) Goode (England) Johnson	4	5

=== Women's doubles ===
Quarterfinals
(England) Fiona Smith (England) Sara Sankey	15	15
(Canada) Julie Still (Canada) Toni Whittaker	8	4
(Malaysia) Tan Sui Hoon (Malaysia) Lim Siew Choon	15	15	18
(Scotland) Elinor Allen (Scotland) Jenny Allen	17	3	15
(England) Gillian Clark (England) Gillian Gowers	15	15
(Hong Kong) Chan Man Wa (Hong Kong) Amy Chan	7	10
(Canada) Johanne Falardeau (Canada) Denyse Julien	15	15
(Malaysia) Lee Wai Leng (Malaysia) Tan Lee Wai	9	4

Semifinals
(England) Sankey (England) Smith	15	7	15
(Malaysia) Tan Sui Hoon (Malaysia) Lim Siew Choon	3	15	5
(England) Clark (England) Gowers	15	15
(Canada) Falardeau (Canada) Julien	3	0

Finals
(England) Sankey (England) Smith	18	2	15
(England) Clark (England) Gowers	14	15	9
Third place
(Canada) Falardeau (Canada) Julien	18	15
(Malaysia) Tan Sui Hoon (Malaysia) Lim Siew Choon	13	2

=== Mixed doubles ===
Quarterfinals
(Hong Kong) Chan Chi Choi (Hong Kong) Amy Chan	15	15
(Canada) Mike Butler (Canada) Claire Sharpe	4	8
(England) Steve Baddeley (England) Gillian Gowers	15	18
(Canada) Mike Bitten (Canada) Doris Piche	9	14
(England) Miles Johnson (England) Sara Sankey	15	15
(New Zealand) Glenn Stewart (New Zealand) Rhonda Robertson	5	8
(England) Andy Goode (England) Gillian Clark	15	15
(Scotland) Dan Travers (Scotland) Aileen Nairn	8	10

Semifinals
(Hong Kong) Choi (Hong Kong) Chan	10	15	15
(England) Baddeley (England) Gowers	15	7	7
(England) Johnson (England) Sankey	18	15
(England) Goode (England) Clark	16	8

Finals
(Hong Kong) Choi (Hong Kong) Chan	15	15
(England) Johnson (England) Sankey	7	12
Third place
(England) Goode (England) Clark	w/o
(England) Baddeley (England) Gowers	scr

=== Mixed team ===
Semi finals

Team One	Team Two	Score
England	Hong Kong	5-0
Canada	New Zealand	5-0

Bronze medal play off

Hong Kong
5

New Zealand
0

			1	2	3
1	(Hong Kong) (New Zealand)	Yeung Yik Kei; Glenn Stewart	15; 6	3; 15	15; 12
2	(Hong Kong) (New Zealand)	Chan Chi Choi / Chan Siu Kwong; Phil Horne / Kerrin Harrison	15; 6	15; 10
3	(Hong Kong) (New Zealand)	Chan Man Wa; Lynne Horne	11; 5	11; 8
4	(Hong Kong) (New Zealand)	Amy Chan / Chan Man Wa; Toni Whittaker / Jane Clarke	15; 7	5; 5
5	(Hong Kong) (New Zealand)	Chan Chi Choi / Amy Chan; Phil Horne / Toni Whittaker	15; 7	15; 9

Final

England
5

Canada
0

			1	2	3
1	(England) (Canada)	Darren Hall; Mike Butler	15; 8	15; 8
2	(England) (Canada)	Andy Goode / Steve Baddeley; Bryan Blanshard / Mike Bitten	15; 5	15; 8
3	(England) (Canada)	Fiona Smith; Denyse Julien	7; 11	11; 1	11; 0
4	(England) (Canada)	Gillian Clark / Gillian Gowers; Claire Sharpe / Johanne Falardeau	15; 7	15; 9
5	(England) (Canada)	Andy Goode / Gillian Gowers; Bryan Blanshard / Claire Sharpe	15; 10	15; 9
