= Julian Robertson (badminton) =

British badminton player

Personal information
- Born: Julian Anthony Robertson; 9 October 1969 (age 57) Peterborough, England
- Height: 1.82 m (6 ft 0 in)
- Weight: 73 kg (161 lb)

Sport
- Country: England
- Sport: Badminton
- Handedness: Right
- Event: Men's & mixed doubles

Men's & mixed doubles
- BWF profile
Medal record
Men's badminton
Representing England
Commonwealth Games
Bronze medal – third place	1998 Kuala Lumpur	Men's doubles
Bronze medal – third place	1998 Kuala Lumpur	Men's team
European Championships
Silver medal – second place	1998 Sofia	Mixed team
Bronze medal – third place	1998 Sofia	Men's doubles

Julian Anthony Robertson (born 9 October 1969) is a former English badminton player. He competed for Great Britain at the 1996 and 2000 Summer Olympics. Robertson was a former British champion and bronze medallists at the 1998 Commonwealth Games in the men's doubles and team event. He also won the men's doubles bronze at the 1998 European Championships, and helped the team win the silver medal. He has also been involved in another 6 European championship medal winning teams. The former world No. 8 has been working as a Great Britain coach since 2004 and is one of the most decorated home grown coaches England has ever produced achieving Olympic World Commonwealth and European success with his athletes. He is based in Milton Keynes.

== Personal life ==
Robertson is married, has 2 children and lives in Northampton.

== Achievements ==
=== Commonwealth Games ===
Men's doubles
Year	Venue	Partner	Opponent	Score	Result
1998	Kuala Lumpur Badminton Stadium, Kuala Lumpur, Malaysia	(England) Nathan Robertson	(Malaysia) Cheah Soon Kit (Malaysia) Yap Kim Hock	2–15, 15–12, 8–15	Bronze

=== European Championships ===
Men's doubles
Year	Venue	Partner	Opponent	Score	Result
1998	Winter Sports Palace, Sofia, Bulgaria	(England) Nathan Robertson	(Sweden) Peter Axelsson (Sweden) Pär-Gunnar Jönsson	10–15, 15–10, 10–15	Bronze

=== IBF World Grand Prix ===
The World Badminton Grand Prix has been sanctioned by the International Badminton Federation from 1983 to 2006.

Men's doubles
Year	Tournament	Partner	Opponent	Score	Result
1995	Scottish Open	(England) Nick Ponting	(Denmark) Jesper Larsen (Sweden) Stellan Österberg	15–5, 15–6	(gold) Winner
1996	Polish Open	(England) Nick Ponting	(China) Ge Cheng (China) Tao Xiaoqiang	15–9, 12–15, 10–15	(silver) Runner-up
1998	Polish Open	(England) Nathan Robertson	(England) Ian Pearson (England) Nick Ponting	2–15, 15–8, 15–3	(gold) Winner

Mixed doubles
Year	Tournament	Partner	Opponent	Score	Result
1995	Scottish Open	(England) Lorraine Cole	(Denmark) Lars Pedersen (Denmark) Anne Mette Bille	14–17, 10–15	(silver) Runner-up

=== IBF International ===
Men's doubles
Year	Tournament	Partner	Opponent	Score	Result
1992	Iceland International	(England) Simon Archer	(Scotland) Russell Hogg (Scotland) Kenny Middlemiss	15–9, 15–9	(gold) Winner
1992	Irish International	(England) Chris Hunt	(Commonwealth of Independent States) Andrey Antropov (Commonwealth of Independent States) Nikolai Zuyev	15–12, 10–15, 15–18	(silver) Runner-up
1993	Iceland International	(England) Dave Wright	(Iceland) Broddi Kristjánsson (Iceland) Oli Bjorn Zimsen	15–2, 15–4	(gold) Winner
1993	Irish International	(England) Simon Archer	(England) Neil Cottrill (England) John Quinn	15–10, 15–6	(gold) Winner
1994	Welsh International	(England) Nick Ponting	(Russia) Andrey Antropov (Russia) Nikolai Zuyev	2–15, 6–15	(silver) Runner-up
1995	Hungarian International	(England) Nathan Robertson	(Austria) Harald Koch (Austria) Jürgen Koch	15–18, 15–7, 15–13	(gold) Winner
1995	Welsh International	(England) Nathan Robertson	(Russia) Andrey Antropov (Russia) Nikolai Zuyev	8–15, 8–15	(silver) Runner-up
1996	Norwegian International	(England) Nathan Robertson	(Sweden) Henrik Andersson (Sweden) Johan Tholinsson	9–2, 9–8, 9–3	(gold) Winner
1997	Norwegian International	(England) Nathan Robertson	(Sweden) Henrik Andersson (Sweden) Jens Olsson	4–9, 9–4, 9–2, 0–9, 9–4	(gold) Winner
2002	Welsh International	(England) Peter Jeffrey	(Russia) Stanislav Pukhov (Russia) Nikolai Zuyev	3–15, 11–15	(silver) Runner-up
2002	Irish International	(England) Peter Jeffrey	(Scotland) Robert Blair (England) Ian Palethorpe	5–15, 17–14, 9–15	(silver) Runner-up

Mixed doubles
Year	Tournament	Partner	Opponent	Score	Result
1993	Iceland International	(England) Kerri McKittrick	(England) Dave Wright (England) Lorraine Thomas	5–15, 0–1 retired	(silver) Runner-up
1993	Irish International	(England) Sara Hardaker	(England) Simon Archer (England) Joanne Davies	5–15, 10–15	(silver) Runner-up
1995	Welsh International	(England) Lorraine Cole	(Russia) Nikolai Zuyev (Russia) Marina Yakusheva	11–15, 7–15	(silver) Runner-up
1995	Irish International	(England) Lorraine Cole	(England) Nathan Robertson (England) Gail Emms	15–4, 15–4	(gold) Winner
1996	Norwegian International	(England) Gail Emms	(Denmark) Jonas Rasmussen (Denmark) Ann-Lou Jørgensen	9–6, 2–9, 9–5, 9–5	(gold) Winner
