= Welsh International =

Badminton championships

The Welsh International is an international badminton championship held in Wales since 1928 and is thereby one of the oldest badminton tournaments in the world. The tournament was halted during World War II and until 1956, between 1960 and 1966, and in 1971. It is organised by Welsh Badminton Cymru, the governing body for badminton in Wales.

== Past winners ==
Year	Men's singles	Women's singles	Men's doubles	Women's doubles	Mixed doubles	Ref
1927	(England) Alan Titherley	(England) R. Finch	(Republic of Ireland) J. D. M. McCallum (England) Alan Titherley	(England) Thompson-Smith (England) Reid	(Scotland) F. L. Treasure (England) Meredith	
1928	(England) Thomas P. Dick	(England) Margaret Tragett	(Scotland) F. L. Treasure (England) F. B. Malthouse	(England) Marian Horsley (Wales) L. W. Myers	(England) Thomas P. Dick (England) Hazel Hogarth	
1929	(England) Donald Hume	(Republic of Ireland) Dorothy Colpoys	(England) Donald Hume (England) Ralph Nichols	(England) Marian Horsley (Wales) L. W. Myers	(England) Thomas P. Dick (England) Hazel Hogarth	
1930	(England) Thomas P. Dick	(Republic of Ireland) Dorothy Colpoys	(England) Thomas P. Dick (England) W. Basil Jones	(England) Marian Horsley (Wales) L. W. Myers	(England) Thomas P. Dick (England) Hazel Hogarth	
1931	(Republic of Ireland) Willoughby Hamilton	(England) Thelma Kingsbury	(Republic of Ireland) Arthur Hamilton (Republic of Ireland) Willoughby Hamilton	(England) Hazel Hogarth (England) Thelma Kingsbury	(England) Ralph Nichols (England) Nora Coop	
1932	(Republic of Ireland) Willoughby Hamilton	(England) Alice Woodroffe	(England) Donald Hume (England) Raymond M. White	(Wales) L. W. Myers (England) Alice Woodroffe	(England) Thomas P. Dick (England) Hazel Hogarth	
1933	(Republic of Ireland) Willoughby Hamilton	(England) Betty Uber	(England) Donald Hume (England) Raymond M. White	(England) Betty Uber (England) Thelma Kingsbury	(England) Donald Hume (England) Betty Uber	
1934	(England) Raymond M. White	(England) Thelma Kingsbury	(Republic of Ireland) Willoughby Hamilton (Republic of Ireland) Ian Maconachie	(England) Betty Uber (England) Thelma Kingsbury	(England) B. P. Cook (England) Betty Uber	
1935	(England) Raymond M. White	(England) Thelma Kingsbury	(England) Raymond M. White (Republic of Ireland) Ian Maconachie	(England) Betty Uber (England) Thelma Kingsbury	(Republic of Ireland) Ian Maconachie (England) Marian Horsley	
1936	(England) Thomas P. Dick	(England) Greta Graham	(England) H. Morland (England) Kenneth Wilson	(England) Dorothy Graham (England) Greta Graham	(England) Raymond M. White (England) Thelma Kingsbury	
1937	(England) Raymond M. White	(England) Daphne Young	(England) Thomas P. Dick (England) H. E. Baldwin	(Wales) L. W. Myers (Republic of Ireland) Dorothy Colpoys	(Republic of Ireland) Thomas Boyle (Republic of Ireland) Olive Wilson	
1938	(Denmark) Tage Madsen	(England) Betty Uber	(Republic of Ireland) Thomas Boyle (Republic of Ireland) James Rankin	(England) Betty Uber (England) Diana Doveton	(Republic of Ireland) Thomas Boyle (Republic of Ireland) Olive Wilson	
1939–1954	no competition					
1955	(Republic of Ireland) James P. Doyle	(Republic of Ireland) H. B. Mercer	(Republic of Ireland) Desmond Lacey (Republic of Ireland) James P. Doyle	(Republic of Ireland) H. B. Mercer (Republic of Ireland) R. Smyth	(Republic of Ireland) Kenneth Carlisle (Republic of Ireland) R. Smyth	
1956	(Federation of Malaya) Oon Chong Teik	(Scotland) Maggie McIntosh	(England) Kenneth Derrick (England) A. R. V. Dolman	(Scotland) Marjory Russell (Scotland) Maggie McIntosh	(England) Kenneth Derrick (England) B. Maxwell	
1957	(Federation of Malaya) Oon Chong Jin	(Republic of Ireland) Mary O'Sullivan	(England) Kenneth Derrick (England) A. R. V. Dolman	(England) June Timperley (England) Patricia Dolan	(Federation of Malaya) Oon Chong Jin (England) June Timperley	
1958	(England) Hugh Findlay	(England) Heather Ward	(England) Tony Jordan (England) Hugh Findlay	(England) Heather Ward (England) P. E. Broad	(England) Hugh Findlay (England) Heather Ward	
1959–1965	no competition					
1966	(England) Roger Mills	(Scotland) Mary Thompson	(England) Roger Mills (Scotland) Robert McCoig	(Wales) Muriel Withers (Wales) Betty Fisher	(Scotland) Robert McCoig (Scotland) McCoig	
1967	(England) Roger Mills	(England) Julie Charles	(England) Roger Mills (England) J. G. Pearson	(England) Julie Charles (Wales) Angela Dickson	(England) Roger Mills (England) Julie Charles	
1968	(Wales) Howard Jennings	(Wales) Angela Dickson	(England) Mike Tredgett (England) A. Finch	(Wales) Jean Masters (Wales) Rosemary Gerrish	(Wales) Howard Jennings (Wales) Angela Dickson	
1969	(Wales) Howard Jennings	(Wales) Angela Dickson	(Wales) Howard Jennings (Wales) Alan Fisher	(Wales) Angela Dickson (Wales) Betty Fisher	(Wales) Howard Jennings (Wales) Angela Dickson	
1970	no competition					
1971	(England) Mike Tredgett	(Wales) Betty Fisher	(England) Philip Smith (England) William Kidd	(Wales) Angela Dickson (Wales) Betty Fisher	(England) Mike Tredgett (England) Kathryn Whiting	
1972	(England) John Gardner	(Northern Ireland) Barbara Beckett	(Northern Ireland) John McCloy (Northern Ireland) Peter Moore	(England) Anne Forrest (England) Kathryn Whiting	(Northern Ireland) Clifford McIlwaine (Northern Ireland) Barbara Beckett	
1973	(England) Michael Wilkes	(Northern Ireland) Barbara Beckett	(England) Michael Wilkes (England) Alan Connor	(Northern Ireland) Barbara Beckett (Wales) Sue Alfieri	(England) Michael Wilkes (England) Anne Forrest	
1974	(England) Michael Wilkes	(England) Anne Statt	(England) Michael Wilkes (England) Alan Connor	(England) Anne Statt (England) Margo Winter	(England) Alan Connor (England) Margo Winter	
1975	(England) Kevin Jolly	(England) Pauline Davis	(England) Tim Stokes (England) Kevin Jolly	(Wales) Angela Dickson (Wales) Sue Brimble	(Wales) Howard Jennings (Wales) Angela Dickson	
1976	(England) David Eddy	(England) Paula Kilvington	(England) David Eddy (England) Eddy Sutton	(England) Anne Statt (England) Jane Webster	(England) David Eddy (England) Barbara Giles	
1977	(England) Mike Tredgett	(England) Gillian Gilks	(England) David Eddy (England) Eddy Sutton	(England) Barbara Sutton (Netherlands) Marjan Ridder	(England) Elliot Stuart (England) Gillian Gilks	
1978	(England) Kevin Jolly	(England) Nora Perry	(England) Ray Stevens (England) Mike Tredgett	(England) Barbara Sutton (England) Nora Perry	(England) Mike Tredgett (England) Nora Perry	
1979	(Sweden) Thomas Kihlström	(England) Jane Webster	(Sweden) Thomas Kihlström (Sweden) Bengt Fröman	(England) Jane Webster (England) Karen Puttick	(Scotland) Billy Gilliland (England) Karen Puttick	
1980	(England) Ray Stevens	(England) Gillian Gilks	(England) Ray Stevens (England) Mike Tredgett	(England) Gillian Gilks (England) Paula Kilvington	(England) Mike Tredgett (England) Nora Perry	
1981	(England) Steve Baddeley	(England) Karen Bridge	(England) David Eddy (England) Eddy Sutton	(England) Karen Chapman (England) Sally Podger	(Scotland) Billy Gilliland (England) Karen Chapman	
1982	(England) Steve Butler	(England) Sally Podger	(England) Mike Tredgett (England) Dipak Tailor	(England) Nora Perry (England) Jane Webster	(England) Dipak Tailor (England) Nora Perry	
1983	(England) Steve Butler	(England) Karen Beckman	(England) Mike Tredgett (England) Martin Dew	(England) Helen Troke (England) Karen Chapman	(England) Mike Tredgett (England) Karen Chapman	
1984	(Denmark) Morten Frost	(Denmark) Charlotte Hattens	(Scotland) Billy Gilliland (Scotland) Dan Travers	(England) Gillian Gilks (England) Helen Troke	(England) Martin Dew (England) Gillian Gilks	
1985	(England) Darren Hall	(England) Fiona Elliott	(England) Martin Dew (England) Dipak Tailor	(England) Karen Beckman (England) Sara Halsall	(Denmark) Jesper Knudsen (Denmark) Nettie Nielsen	
1986	(England) Darren Hall	(England) Fiona Elliott	(England) Martin Dew (England) Darren Hall	(England) Karen Beckman (England) Sara Halsall	(England) Martin Dew (England) Gillian Gilks	
1987	(India) Vimal Kumar	(South Korea) Lee Jung-mi	(England) Richard Outterside (England) Mike Brown	(England) Fiona Elliott (England) Sara Halsall	(England) Martin Dew (England) Gillian Gilks	
1988	(England) Darren Hall	(South Korea) Bang Soo-hyun	(England) Nick Ponting (England) Dave Wright	(England) Karen Beckman (England) Sara Sankey	(England) Mike Brown (England) Jillian Wallwork	
1989	(England) Mathew Smith	(England) Joanne Muggeridge	(England) Nick Ponting (England) Dave Wright	(England) Karen Chapman (England) Sara Sankey	(England) Dave Wright (England) Claire Palmer	
1990	(India) Vimal Kumar	(Canada) Denyse Julien	(England) Nick Ponting (England) Dave Wright	(England) Cheryl Johnson (England) Julie Bradbury	(England) Nick Ponting (England) Joanne Wright	
1991	(Australia) Wei Yan	(England) Fiona Smith	(England) Michael Adams (Wales) Chris Rees	(Canada) Denyse Julien (Canada) Doris Piché	(England) Andy Goode (England) Joanne Wright	
1992	(England) Anders Nielsen	(England) Suzanne Louis-Lane	(England) Nick Ponting (England) Dave Wright	(England) Julie Bradbury (England) Sara Sankey	(England) Nick Ponting (England) Joanne Wright	
1993	(England) Darren Hall	(Russia) Marina Andrievskaya	(England) Michael Adams (England) Simon Archer	(England) Julie Bradbury (England) Joanne Wright	(England) Chris Hunt (England) Joanne Wright	
1994	(Denmark) Peter Rasmussen	(Canada) Denyse Julien	(Russia) Andrei Andropov (Russia) Nikolai Zuyev	(England) Julie Bradbury (England) Joanne Wright	(England) Nick Ponting (England) Joanne Wright	
1995	(England) Colin Haughton	(Russia) Elena Rybkina	(Russia) Andrei Andropov (Russia) Nikolai Zuyev	(Russia) Elena Rybkina (Russia) Marina Yakusheva	(Russia) Nikolai Zuyev (Russia) Marina Yakusheva	
1996	(Netherlands) Chris Bruil	(Wales) Kelly Morgan	(England) Ian Pearson (England) James Anderson	(Netherlands) Nicole van Hooren (Netherlands) Brenda Conijn	(Netherlands) Quinten van Dalm (Netherlands) Nicole van Hooren	
1997	(Netherlands) Dicky Palyama	(Netherlands) Brenda Beenhakker	(England) James Anderson (England) Ian Sullivan	(England) Sara Sankey (England) Ella Tripp	(England) James Anderson (England) Sara Sankey	
1998	(Sweden) Daniel Eriksson	(Sweden) Marina Andrievskaya	(Germany) Joachim Tesche (Canada) Jean-Philippe Goyette	(Sweden) Marina Andrievskaya (Sweden) Catrine Bengtsson	(Sweden) Henrik Andersson (Sweden) Marina Andrievskaya	
1999	(Wales) Richard Vaughan	(Russia) Marina Yakusheva	(Sweden) Joachim Andersson (Sweden) Peter Axelsson	(Russia) Irina Ruslyakova (Russia) Marina Yakusheva	(England) Peter Jeffrey (England) Joanne Davies	
2000	(Wales) Richard Vaughan	(England) Tracey Hallam	(England) Anthony Clark (England) Ian Sullivan	(England) Ella Tripp (England) Sara Sankey	(England) Anthony Clark (England) Gail Emms	
2001	(Indonesia) Irwansyah	(Netherlands) Brenda Beenhakker	(France) Vincent Laigle (France) Svetoslav Stoyanov	(England) Ella Tripp (England) Sara Sankey	(Russia) Nikolai Zuyev (Russia) Marina Yakusheva	
2002	(Indonesia) Irwansyah	(Netherlands) Karina de Wit	(Russia) Nikolai Zuyev (Russia) Stanislav Pukhov	(England) Ella Tripp (England) Joanne Wright	(Russia) Nikolai Zuyev (Russia) Marina Yakusheva	
2003	(Wales) Irwansyah	(Russia) Ella Karachkova	(England) Ashley Thilthorpe (England) Kristian Roebuck	(Russia) Ella Karachkova (Russia) Anastasia Russkikh	(Russia) Alexandr Russkikh (Russia) Anastasia Russkikh	
2004	(England) Nathan Rice	(Bulgaria) Petya Nedelcheva	(Indonesia) Reuben Gordown (Indonesia) Aji Basuki Sindoro	(Bulgaria) Petya Nedelcheva (Scotland) Yuan Wemyss	(Wales) Matthew Hughes (Wales) Kelly Morgan	
2005	(India) Chetan Anand	(England) Eleanor Cox	(England) Andrew Ellis (England) Dean George	(England) Hayley Connor (England) Heather Olver	(India) Valiyaveetil Diju (India) Jwala Gutta	
2006	(Wales) Irwansyah	(Australia) Huang Chia-chi	(Wales) Matthew Hughes (Wales) Martyn Lewis	(England) Natalie Munt (England) Mariana Agathangelou	(England) Kristian Roebuck (England) Natalie Munt	
2007	(Germany) Marc Zwiebler	(England) Jill Pittard	(Poland) Wojciech Szkudlarczyk (Poland) Adam Cwalina	(Republic of Ireland) Chloe Magee (Republic of Ireland) Bing Huang	(Poland) Wojciech Szkudlarczyk (Poland) Malgorzata Kurdelska	
2008	(France) Brice Leverdez	(Estonia) Kati Tolmoff	(Scotland) Andrew Bowman (Wales) Martyn Lewis	(England) Mariana Agathangelou (Scotland) Jillie Cooper	(Scotland) Watson Briggs (Scotland) Jillie Cooper	
2009	(Denmark) Kristian Nielsen	(Russia) Tatjana Bibik	(Russia) Vitalij Durkin (Russia) Aleksandr Nikolaenko	(Russia) Valeria Sorokina (Russia) Nina Vislova	(Russia) Vitalij Durkin (Russia) Nina Vislova	
2010	(Spain) Pablo Abián	(Malaysia) Anita Raj Kaur	(Germany) Peter Käsbauer (Germany) Josche Zurwonne	(Malaysia) Joanne Quay (Malaysia) Anita Raj Kaur	(Germany) Peter Käsbauer (Germany) Johanna Goliszewski	
2011	(Sri Lanka) Niluka Karunaratne	(Switzerland) Nicole Schaller	(England) Chris Coles (England) Matthew Nottingham	(Malaysia) Ng Hui Ern (Malaysia) Ng Hui Lin	(Scotland) Martin Campbell (Malaysia) Ng Hui Lin	
2012	(Chinese Taipei) Chou Tien-chen	(Chinese Taipei) Chiang Mei-hui	(England) Marcus Ellis (Scotland) Paul Van Rietvelde	(England) Gabrielle White (England) Lauren Smith	(England) Marcus Ellis (England) Gabrielle White	
2013	(Spain) Pablo Abián	(United States) Beiwen Zhang	(England) Chris Coles (England) Matthew Nottingham	(Australia) Tang Hetian (Australia) Renuga Veeran	(England) Chris Langridge (England) Heather Olver	
2014	(Scotland) Kieran Merrilees	(Spain) Beatriz Corrales	(England) Matthew Nottingham (England) Harley Towler	(England) Heather Olver (England) Lauren Smith	(England) Chris Coles (England) Sophie Brown	
2015	(Russia) Vladimir Malkov	(Denmark) Anna Thea Madsen	(England) Marcus Ellis (England) Chris Langridge	(Bulgaria) Gabriela Stoeva (Bulgaria) Stefani Stoeva	(England) Matthew Nottingham (England) Emily Westwood	
2016	(Spain) Pablo Abián	(Spain) Beatriz Corrales	(Chinese Taipei) Liao Min-chun (Chinese Taipei) Su Cheng-heng	(Russia) Anastasia Chervyakova (Russia) Olga Morozova	(Poland) Robert Mateusiak (Poland) Nadieżda Zięba	
2017	(Republic of Ireland) Nhat Nguyen	(India) Tanvi Lad	(England) Oliver Baczala (England) Michael Roe	(Belgium) Lise Jaques (Belgium) Flore Vandenhoucke	(England) Michael Roe (England) Jessica Hopton	
2018	(Spain) Luís Enrique Peñalver	(Spain) Clara Azurmendi	(England) Max Flynn (England) Callum Hemming	(Scotland) Julie MacPherson (Scotland) Holly Newall	(England) Matthew Clare (England) Victoria Williams	
2019	(Denmark) Ditlev Jæger Holm	(Spain) Clara Azurmendi	(Chinese Taipei) Chiang Chien-wei (Chinese Taipei) Ye Hong-wei	(England) Abigail Holden (England) Lizzie Tolman	(Scotland) Alexander Dunn (Scotland) Ciara Torrance	
2020	Cancelled (Note: This tournament, originally to be played from 25 to 28 November, was later cancelled due to the COVID-19 pandemic in Wales.)					
2021	(France) Arnaud Merklé	(Chinese Taipei) Hsu Wen-chi	(South Korea) Kim Gi-jung (South Korea) Kim Sa-rang	(France) Margot Lambert (France) Anne Tran	(France) William Villeger (France) Anne Tran	
2022	(Denmark) Mads Christophersen	(Germany) Yvonne Li	(Denmark) Rasmus Kjær (Denmark) Frederik Søgaard	(France) Margot Lambert (France) Anne Tran	(Denmark) Jesper Toft (Denmark) Clara Graversen	
2023	(Finland) Joakim Oldorff	(France) Rosy Oktavia Pancasari	(Scotland) Christopher Grimley (Scotland) Matthew Grimley	(Bulgaria) Gabriela Stoeva (Bulgaria) Stefani Stoeva	(Germany) Jan Colin Völker (Germany) Stine Küspert	
2024	(Australia) Karono	(Chinese Taipei) Huang Ching-ping	(England) Oliver Butler (England) Samuel Jones	(Spain) Paula López (Spain) Lucía Rodríguez	(Spain) Rubén García (Spain) Lucía Rodríguez	
2025	(Denmark) Ditlev Jæger Holm	(Austria) Xu Wei	(Denmark) Kristoffer Kolding (Denmark) Calvin Lundsgaard	(Denmark) Simona Pilgaard (Denmark) Signe Schulz	(France) Natan Begga (France) Elsa Jacob	
2026						

== Performances by nation ==
As of the 2025 edition

Rank	Nation	MS	WS	MD	WD	XD	Total
1	England	31	30	45	40.5	42.5	189
2	Wales	6	4	3	8.5	4	25.5
3	Ireland	5	6	6	3	4.5	24.5
4	Russia	1	5	4	5	5	20
5	Scotland	1	2	4	3	5	15
6	Denmark	7	2	2	1	2	14
7	Spain	4	4	0	1	1	10
8	France	2	1	1	2	2	8
9	Netherlands	2	3	0	1.5	1	7.5
10	Sweden	2	1	2	1	1	7
11	Chinese Taipei	1	3	2	0	0	6
11	Malaya; Malaysia	2	1	0	2	1	6
13	Germany	1	1	1.5	0	2	5.5
14	India	3	1	0	0	1	5
15	Australia	2	1	0	1	0	4
16	Bulgaria	0	1	0	2.5	0	3.5
16	Canada	0	2	0.5	1	0	3.5
18	Indonesia	2	0	1	0	0	3
18	Poland	0	0	1	0	2	3
18	South Korea	0	2	1	0	0	3
21	Austria	0	1	0	0	0	1
21	Belgium	0	0	0	1	0	1
21	Estonia	0	1	0	0	0	1
21	Finland	1	0	0	0	0	1
21	Sri Lanka	1	0	0	0	0	1
21	Switzerland	0	1	0	0	0	1
21	United States	0	1	0	0	0	1
Total		74	74	74	74	74	370
