= Chris Hunt (badminton) =

British badminton player (born 1968)

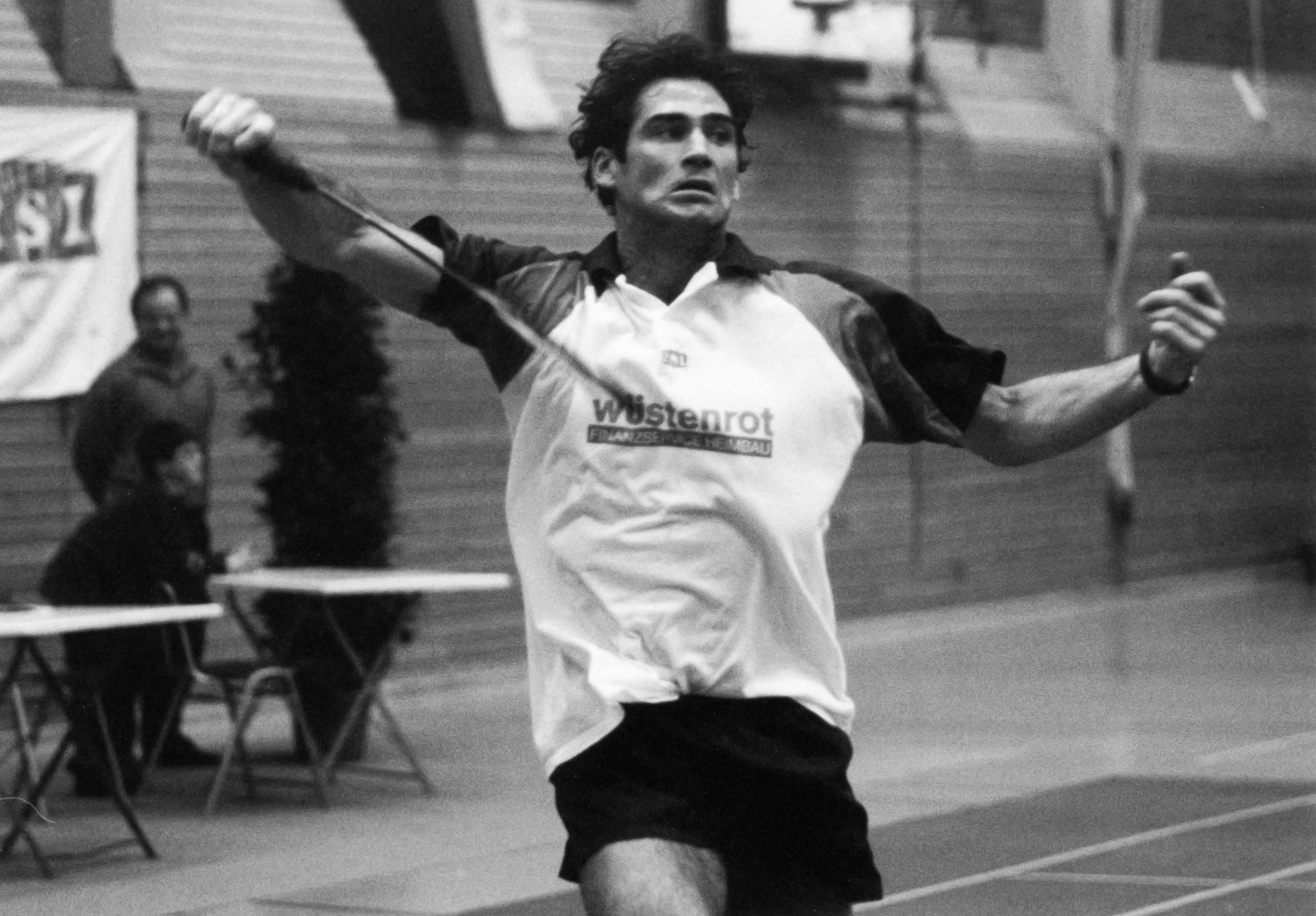

Personal information
- Nickname: Chunty
- Born: Christopher John Hunt; 1 December 1968 (age 57) Bolton, Lancashire, England
- Height: 1.84 m (6 ft 0 in)

Sport
- Country: England
- Sport: Badminton
- Handedness: Right

Men's & mixed doubles
- Highest ranking: 2
- BWF profile
Medal record
Men's badminton
Representing England
Commonwealth Games
| Gold medal – first place | 1994 Victoria | Mixed doubles |
| Gold medal – first place | 1994 Victoria | Mixed team |
| Silver medal – second place | 1994 Victoria | Men's doubles |
| Bronze medal – third place | 1998 Kuala Lumpur | Men's doubles |
| Bronze medal – third place | 1998 Kuala Lumpur | Mixed doubles |
| Bronze medal – third place | 1998 Kuala Lumpur | Men's team |
European Championships
| Gold medal – first place | 1994 Den Bosch | Men's Doubles |
| Gold medal – first place | 1998 Sofia | Men's Doubles |
| Bronze medal – third place | 1996 Herning | Men's Doubles |
European Mixed Team Championships
| Silver medal – second place | 1998 Sofia | Mixed team |
| Bronze medal – third place | 1994 Den Bosch | Mixed team |
| Bronze medal – third place | 1996 Herning | Mixed team |
European Junior Championships
| Silver medal – second place | 1987 Warsaw | Mixed team |
| Bronze medal – third place | 1987 Warsaw | Boys' doubles |

Christopher John Hunt (born 1 December 1968) is a retired badminton player from England.

== Personal life ==
Chris Hunt was born on 1 December 1968 in Bolton, England. He has one brother.

In 2000 he met Liza Giambattista. In 2007 Hunt had a daughter called Gabriella Giambattista-Hunt. Then in 2018 Hunt and Giambattista got married after 18 years of being together.

== Career ==
Hunt won the gold medal at the European Championships in the men's doubles with Simon Archer in 1994 and 1998. In 1996 they won the bronze medal. Hunt also won two commonwealth gold medals in the mixed team event and mixed doubles in Victoria [1994], along with a silver medal in the men's doubles. In 1998 event at Kuala Lumpur, Hunt won the three bronzes in men's doubles, mixed doubles and men's team event.

He also participated at the 1992 Olympic Games in men's doubles, with Andy Goode, and they were defeated in the round of 16 by Lee Sang-bok and Shon Jin-hwan. At the 1996 Olympic Games, he competed in the men's doubles with Simon Archer, losing in quarterfinals, and in mixed doubles with Joanne Muggeridge, losing in the round of 32. Hunt also competed at the 2000 Olympic Games in the mixed doubles with Donna Kellogg, and they were beaten in the round of 32.

== Major Achievements ==
=== Commonwealth Games ===
Men's doubles
| Year | Venue | Partner | Opponent | Score | Result |
|---|---|---|---|---|---|
| 1994 | McKinnon Gym, University of Victoria; Victoria, Canada | (England) Simon Archer | (Malaysia) Cheah Soon Kit (Malaysia) Soo Beng Kiang | 10–15, 9–15 | Silver |
| 1998 | Kuala Lumpur Badminton Stadium; Kuala Lumpur, Malaysia | (England) Simon Archer | (Malaysia) Choong Tan Fook (Malaysia) Lee Wan Wah | 13–15, 11–15 | Bronze |

Mixed doubles
| Year | Venue | Partner | Opponent | Score | Result |
|---|---|---|---|---|---|
| 1994 | McKinnon Gym, University of Victoria; Victoria, Canada | (England) Gillian Clark | (England) Simon Archer (England) Julie Bradbury | 15–11, 15–4 | Gold |
| 1998 | Kuala Lumpur Badminton Stadium; Kuala Lumpur, Malaysia | (England) Donna Kellogg | (England) Nathan Robertson (England) Joanne Davies | 15–7, 15–17, 14–17 | Bronze |

=== European Championships ===
Men's doubles
| Year | Venue | Partner | Opponent | Score | Result |
|---|---|---|---|---|---|
| 1994 | Maaspoort; Den Bosch, Netherlands | (England) Simon Archer | (Russia) Andrey Antropov (Russia) Nikolai Zuyev | 18–16, 15–4 | Gold |
| 1996 | Herning Badminton Klub; Herning, Denmark | (England) Simon Archer | (Denmark) Jon Holst-Christensen (Denmark) Thomas Lund | 6–15, 10–15 | Bronze |
| 1998 | Winter Sports Palace; Sofia, Bulgaria | (England) Simon Archer | (Sweden) Peter Axelsson (Sweden) Pär-Gunnar Jönsson | 15–3, 15–3 | Gold |

=== European Junior Championships ===
Boys' doubles
| Year | Venue | Partner | Opponent | Score | Result |
|---|---|---|---|---|---|
| 1987 | Hali Mery; Warsaw, Poland | (England) Andrew Fairhurst | (Denmark) Frederik Lindquist (Denmark) Thomas Olsen | 15–17, 15–6, 12–15 | Bronze |

=== IBF World Grand Prix ===
The World Badminton Grand Prix sanctioned by International Badminton Federation (IBF) from 1983 to 2006.

Men's doubles
| Year | Tournament | Partner | Opponent | Score | Result |
|---|---|---|---|---|---|
| 1991 | Swiss Open | (England) Andy Goode | (Sweden) Pär-Gunnar Jönsson (Sweden) Stellan Österberg | 10–15, 14–18 | (silver) Runner-up |
| 1994 | Dutch Open | (England) Simon Archer | (Indonesia) Denny Kantono (Indonesia) Antonius Ariantho | 18–17, 5–15, 8–15 | (silver) Runner-up |
| 1995 | Swiss Open | (England) Simon Archer | (Denmark) Jon Holst-Christensen (Denmark) Thomas Lund | 6–15, 7–15 | (silver) Runner-up |
| 1996 | Denmark Open | (England) Simon Archer | (Denmark) Thomas Stavngaard (Denmark) Jim Laugesen | 15–17, 15–10, 7–15 | (silver) Runner-up |
| 1997 | German Open | (England) Simon Archer | (Denmark) Jens Eriksen (Denmark) Jesper Larsen | 4–15, 8–15 | (silver) Runner-up |

Mixed doubles
| Year | Tournament | Partner | Opponent | Score | Result |
|---|---|---|---|---|---|
| 1994 | All England Open | (England) Gillian Clark | (England) Nick Ponting (England) Joanne Wright | 10–15, 11–15 | (silver) Runner-up |
| 1994 | Dutch Open | (England) Gillian Gowers | (Indonesia) Flandy Limpele (Indonesia) Dede Hasanah | 15–5, 15–4 | (gold) Winner |
| 1995 | Russian Open | (England) Gillian Gowers | (Denmark) Jens Eriksen (Denmark) Marlene Thomsen | 3–15, 16–18 | (silver) Runner-up |
| 1996 | U.S. Open | (Denmark) Helene Kirkegaard | (South Korea) Kim Dong-moon (South Korea) Chung So-young | 5–15, 7–15 | (silver) Runner-up |

=== IBF International ===
Men's doubles
| Year | Tournament | Partner | Opponent | Score | Result |
|---|---|---|---|---|---|
| 1989 | Bell's Open | (England) Andrew Fairhurst | (England) Andy Goode (England) Mike Brown | 17–15, 10–15, 18–13 | (gold) Winner |
| 1990 | Irish International | (England) Mike Brown | (Soviet Union) Andrey Antropov (Soviet Union) Sergey Melnikov | 15–4, 15–5 | (gold) Winner |
| 1991 | Portugal International | (England) Simon Archer | (England) Andy Goode (England) Glen Milton | 7–15, 15–2, 10–15 | (silver) Runner-up |
| 1991 | Wimbledon Open | (England) Andy Goode | (England) Nick Ponting (England) Dave Wright | 4–15, 10–15 | (silver) Runner-up |
| 1991 | Irish International | (England) Andy Goode | (England) Nick Ponting (England) Dave Wright | 5–15, 2–15 | (silver) Runner-up |
| 1991 | Spanish International | (England) Andy Goode | (Portugal) Ricardo Fernandes (Portugal) Fernando Silva | 15–4, 15–3 | (gold) Winner |
| 1992 | Austrian International | (England) Andy Goode | (Germany) Michael Keck (Germany) Robert Neumann | 15–5, 15–10 | (gold) Winner |
| 1992 | Portugal International | (England) Andy Goode | (Commonwealth of Independent States) Andrey Antropov (Commonwealth of Independent States) Nikolai Zuyev | 15–11, 15–12 | (gold) Winner |
| 1992 | Wimbledon Open | (England) Andy Goode | (England) Nick Ponting (England) Dave Wright | 8–15, 4–15 | (silver) Runner-up |
| 1992 | Irish International | (England) Julian Robertson | (Commonwealth of Independent States) Andrey Antropov (Commonwealth of Independent States) Nikolai Zuyev | 15–12, 10–15, 15–18 | (silver) Runner-up |
| 1993 | Swiss La Chaux de Fonds | (Mauritius) Michael Adams | (Netherlands) Pierre Pelupessy (Netherlands) Quinten van Dalm | 15–8, 17–14 | (gold) Winner |
| 1993 | Hamburg Cup | (England) Simon Archer | (Denmark) Jon Holst-Christensen (Denmark) Thomas Lund | 8–15, 11–15 | (silver) Runner-up |
| 1993 | Wimbledon Open | (England) Simon Archer | (Russia) Sergei Melnikov (Russia) Nikolai Zuyev | 6–15, 15–7, 15–5 | (gold) Winner |
| 1995 | Wimbledon Open | (England) John Quinn | (England) Ian Pearson (England) James Anderson | 15–2, 15–10 | (gold) Winner |

Mixed doubles
| Year | Tournament | Partner | Opponent | Score | Result |
|---|---|---|---|---|---|
| 1991 | Portugal International | (England) Tracy Dineen | (England) Andy Goode (England) Heidi Bender | 15–10, 2–15, 15–12 | (gold) Winner |
| 1991 | Welsh International | (England) Karen Chapman | (England) Andy Goode (England) Joanne Goode | 17–18, 4–15 | (silver) Runner-up |
| 1993 | Wimbledon International | (England) Joanne Goode | (China) Tao Xiaoqiang (China) Jiang Wen | 6–15, 15–6, 15–13 | (gold) Winner |
| 1993 | Welsh International | (England) Joanne Goode | (England) Simon Archer (England) Joanne Davies | 15–9, 15–8 | (gold) Winner |
| 1999 | Australian International | (England) Gail Emms | (Germany) Michael Keck (Netherlands) Erica van den Heuvel | 9–15, 10–15 | (silver) Runner-up |

=== Invitational tournaments ===
Men's doubles
| Year | Tournament | Partner | Opponent | Score | Result |
|---|---|---|---|---|---|
| 1995 | Copenhagen Masters | (England) Simon Archer | (Denmark) Michael Søgaard (Denmark) Henrik Svarrer | 7–15, 7–15 | (silver) Runner-up |
| 1997 | Copenhagen Masters | (England) Simon Archer | (Indonesia) Tony Gunawan (Indonesia) Candra Wijaya | 13–15, 8–15 | (silver) Runner-up |
