= Ian Pearson (badminton) =

English badminton player

Ian J. Pearson
Personal information
- Born: 15 January 1974 (age 52)
- Height: 1.78 m (5 ft 10 in)

Sport
- Country: England
- Sport: Badminton
- Handedness: Right
- BWF profile
Medal record
Men's badminton
Representing England
European Junior Championships
Bronze medal – third place	1991 Budapest	Boys' doubles

Ian J. Pearson (born 15 January 1974) is a retired English badminton player.

== Achievements ==
=== World Junior Championships ===
The Bimantara World Junior Championships was an international invitation badminton tournament for junior players. It was held in Jakarta, Indonesia from 1987 to 1991.

Boys' doubles
Year	Venue	Partner	Opponent	Score	Result
1991	Istora Senayan; Jakarta, Indonesia	(England) James Anderson	(Indonesia) Bambang Suyono (Indonesia) Candra Wijaya	4–15, 9–15	Bronze

=== European Junior Championships ===
Boys' doubles
Year	Venue	Partner	Opponent	Score	Result
1991	BMTE-Törley impozáns sportcsarnokában Budapest, Hungary	(England) James Anderson	(Denmark) Peter Christensen (Denmark) Martin Lundgaard Hansen	7–15, 1–15	Bronze

=== IBF World Grand Prix ===
The World Badminton Grand Prix has been sanctioned by the International Badminton Federation from 1983 to 2006.

Men's doubles
Year	Tournament	Partner	Opponent	Score	Result
1996	Hamburg Cup	(England) John Quinn	(Indonesia) Dharma Gunawi (Indonesia) Yoseph Phoa	8–15, 7–15	(silver) Runner-up
1998	Polish Open	(England) Nick Ponting	(England) Julian Robertson (England) Nathan Robertson	15–2, 8–15, 3–15	(silver) Runner-up

=== IBF International ===
Men's doubles
Year	Tournament	Partner	Opponent	Score	Result
1993	Czech International	(England) James Anderson	(England) Neil Cottrill (England) John Quinn	15–11, 2–15, 2–15	(silver) Runner-up
1994	Lausanne International	(England) James Anderson	(England) Steve Bish (Brunei) Imay Hendra	15–11, 15–5	(gold) Winner
1995	Wimbledon International	(England) James Anderson	(England) Chris Hunt (England) John Quinn	2–15, 10–15	(silver) Runner-up
1996	Finnish International	(England) James Anderson	(Sweden) Henrik Andersson (Sweden) Johan Tholinsson	15–4, 9–15, 15–2	(gold) Winner
1996	Portugal International	(England) James Anderson	(England) Steve Isaac (England) Nathan Robertson	15–11, 15–5	(gold) Winner
1996	La Chaux-de-Fonds International	(England) James Anderson	(England) Steve Isaac (England) Nathan Robertson	15–12, 13–15, 17–15	(gold) Winner
1996	Welsh International	(England) James Anderson	(Sweden) Fredrik Bergström (Sweden) Rasmus Wengberg	18–16, 15–9	(gold) Winner
1997	Austrian International	(England) Anthony Clark	(Netherlands) Dennis Lens (Netherlands) Quinten van Dalm	16–17, 15–11, 15–7	(gold) Winner
1998	Portugal International	(England) James Anderson	(Portugal) Hugo Rodrigues (Portugal) Fernando Silva	15–8, 15–11	(gold) Winner

Mixed doubles
Year	Tournament	Partner	Opponent	Score	Result
1994	Hungarian International	(England) Sara Hardaker	(Germany) Kai Mitteldorf (Germany) Nicol Pitro	15–10, 15–4	(gold) Winner
1994	Irish International	(England) Karen Chapman	(Scotland) Kenny Middlemiss (Scotland) Elinor Middlemiss	11–15, 15–10, 9–15	(silver) Runner-up
1995	Wimbledon International	(England) Joanne Davies	(Russia) Nikolai Zuyev (Russia) Marina Yakusheva	15–12, 11–15, 15–5	(gold) Winner
1996	Welsh International	(England) Joanne Wright	(Netherlands) Quinten van Dalm (Netherlands) Nicole van Hooren	14–18, 2–15	(silver) Runner-up
