= Billy Gilliland =

Scottish badminton player

Personal information
- Born: 27 March 1957 (age 69) Greenock, Renfrewshire, Scotland

Sport
- Sport: Badminton
Medal record
Men's badminton
Representing Great Britain
World Games
Bronze medal – third place	1981 Santa Clara	Men's doubles
Representing Scotland
Commonwealth Games
Gold medal – first place	1986 Edinburgh	Men's doubles
Silver medal – second place	1978 Edmonton	Mixed doubles
Bronze medal – third place	1986 Edinburgh	Mixed doubles
European Championships
Bronze medal – third place	1984 Preston	Men's doubles
Bronze medal – third place	1978 Preston	Mixed doubles
Bronze medal – third place	1980 Groningen	Mixed doubles

William Allan Gilliland (born 27 March 1957) is a former badminton player from Scotland who won medals at the Commonwealth Games and European Championships.

== Biography ==
Although he won the Scottish national singles title in 1979, the tall, angular Gilliland was a doubles specialist at the international level with his greatest success coming in mixed doubles. Gilliland won mixed doubles at the prestigious All-England Championships with England's Nora Perry in 1985. He had previously reached the All-England final in both men's doubles and mixed doubles in 1982.

He was a mixed doubles bronze medalist at the 1977 IBF World Championships with Joanna Flockhart. Though he won numerous tournaments abroad, perhaps Gilliland's most impressive badminton accomplishment was sharing twelve consecutive Scottish national mixed doubles titles equally with two partners, between 1976 and 1987. With regular partner Dan Travers, he won nine Scottish national men's doubles titles during that period.

In 1986 he represented his nation at the European Championships again and also in 1986, was denied an almost certain mixed team bronze medal when Alison Fulton in the third match was carried off the court, with Scotland leading Australia 2–0 at the time.

He now coaches badminton in a badminton academy.

== Achievements ==
=== World Games ===
Men's doubles
Year	Venue	Partner	Opponent	Score	Result
1981	San Jose Civic Auditorium, California, United States	(Scotland) Dan Travers	(Sweden) Thomas Kihlström (Sweden) Stefan Karlsson	15–10, 0–15, 9–15	Bronze

=== Commonwealth Games ===
Men's doubles
Year	Venue	Partner	Opponent	Score	Result
1986	Meadowbank Sports Centre, Edinburgh, Scotland	(Scotland) Dan Travers	(England) Andy Goode (England) Nigel Tier	15–8, 15–5	Gold

Mixed doubles
Year	Venue	Partner	Opponent	Score	Result
1978	Clare Drake Arena, Edmonton, Alberta, Canada	(Scotland) Joanna Flockhart	(England) Mike Tredgett (England) Nora Perry	7–15, 7–15	Silver
1986	Meadowbank Sports Centre, Edinburgh, Scotland	(Scotland) Christine Heatly	(Canada) Ken Poole (Canada) Linda Cloutier	15–12, 17–14	Bronze

=== European Championships ===
Men's doubles
Year	Venue	Partner	Opponent	Score	Result
1984	Guild Hall, Preston, England	(Scotland) Dan Travers	(Denmark) Morten Frost (Denmark) Jens Peter Nierhoff	13–15, 14–18	Bronze

Mixed doubles
Year	Venue	Partner	Opponent	Score	Result
1978	Guild Hall, Preston, England	(Scotland) Joanna Flockhart	(Denmark) Steen Skovgaard (Denmark) Lene Køppen	4–15, 4–15	Bronze
1980	Martinihal, Groningen, Netherlands	(Scotland) Christine Heatly	(England) Mike Tredgett (England) Nora Perry	15–6, 7–15, 13–18	Bronze

=== IBF World Grand Prix (13 titles, 17 runners-up) ===
The World Badminton Grand Prix sanctioned by International Badminton Federation (IBF) from 1983 to 2006.

Men's doubles
Year	Tournament	Partner	Opponent	Score	Result
1983	Scottish Open	(Scotland) Dan Travers	(England) Andy Goode (England) Gerry Asquith	15–6, 15–7	(gold) Winner
1984	Dutch Open	(England) Dipak Tailor	(Denmark) Michael Kjeldsen (Denmark) Mark Christiansen	9–15, 15–7, 17–18	(silver) Runner-up
1984	Canada Open	(Scotland) Dan Travers	(Malaysia) Razif Sidek (Malaysia) Jalani Sidek	11–15, 9–15	(silver) Runner-up
1985	Canada Open	(Scotland) Dan Travers	(Denmark) Jens Peter Nierhoff (Denmark) Henrik Svarrer	12–15, 11–15	(silver) Runner-up
1985	Scottish Open	(Scotland) Dan Travers	(Denmark) Michael Kjeldsen (Denmark) Mark Christiansen	2–15, 4–15	(silver) Runner-up
1986	Dutch Open	(Scotland) Dan Travers	(China) He Xiangyang (China) Tang Hai	13–18, 9–15	(silver) Runner-up
1986	Poona Open	(England) Steve Baddeley	(China) He Xiangyang (China) Tang Hai	7–15, 6–15	(silver) Runner-up
1986	Scottish Open	(Scotland) Dan Travers	(Denmark) Jesper Knudsen (Denmark) Henrik Svarrer	10–15, 10–15	(silver) Runner-up

Mixed doubles
Year	Tournament	Partner	Opponent	Score	Result
1984	Scottish Open	(England) Gillian Gowers	(England) Duncan Bridge (England) Sara Leeves	15–8, 15–7	(gold) Winner
1984	Dutch Open	(England) Gillian Gowers	(England) Martin Dew (England) Gillian Gilks	14–17, 15–13, 6–15	(silver) Runner-up
1984	Denmark Open	(Indonesia) Imelda Wiguna	(England) Dipak Tailor (England) Nora Perry	retired	(silver) Runner-up
1984	English Masters	(England) Gillian Gowers	(England) Martin Dew (England) Gillian Gilks	15–18, 7–15	(silver) Runner-up
1984	Canadian Open	(England) Karen Chapman	(England) Nigel Tier (England) Gillian Gowers	3–15, 8–15	(silver) Runner-up
1985	Hong Kong Open	(England) Gillian Gowers	(England) Martin Dew (England) Gillian Gilks	10–15, 16–18	(silver) Runner-up
1985	Chinese Taipei Open	(England) Gillian Gowers	(England) Martin Dew (England) Gillian Gilks	8–15, 10–15	(silver) Runner-up
1985	Japan Open	(England) Gillian Gowers	(England) Martin Dew (England) Gillian Gilks	15–10, 18–15	(gold) Winner
1985	All England Open	(England) Nora Perry	(Sweden) Thomas Kihlström (England) Gillian Clark	15–10, 15–12	(gold) Winner
1985	English Masters	(England) Gillian Gowers	(Denmark) Steen Fladberg (Denmark) Gitte Paulsen	15–7, 15–5	(gold) Winner
1985	Canada Open	(England) Nora Perry	(Denmark) Jesper Helledie (Canada) Johanne Falardeau	15–6, 15–9	(gold) Winner
1985	Scottish Open	(England) Gillian Gowers	(Netherlands) Rob Ridder (Netherlands) Erica van Dijck	15–12, 10–15, 18–17	(gold) Winner
1986	Chinese Taipei Open	(England) Nora Perry	(Denmark) Jesper Helledie (Netherlands) Erica van den Heuvel	15–8, 15–3	(gold) Winner
1986	Japan Open	(England) Nora Perry	(England) Nigel Tier (England) Gillian Gowers	17–15, 15–9	(gold) Winner
1986	Poona Open	(England) Nora Perry	(Netherlands) Rob Ridder (Netherlands) Erica van den Heuvel	15–6, 15–8	(gold) Winner
1986	Hong Kong Open	(England) Nora Perry	(England) Andy Goode (England) Fiona Smith	15–5, 15–3	(gold) Winner
1986	English Masters	(England) Nora Perry	(Sweden) Jan-Eric Antonsson (England) Gillian Gowers	12–15, 17–15, 17–14	(gold) Winner
1987	Chinese Taipei Open	(England) Gillian Gowers	(Denmark) Steen Fladberg (England) Gillian Clark	7–15, 18–14, 5–15	(silver) Runner-up
1987	Japan Open	(England) Gillian Gowers	(South Korea) Lee Deuk-choon (South Korea) Chung Myung-hee	12–15, 5–15	(silver) Runner-up
1987	Hong Kong Open	(England) Gillian Gowers	(China) Jiang Guoliang (China) Nong Qunhua	18–14, 13–15, 15–7	(gold) Winner
1987	Malaysia Open	(England) Gillian Gowers	(Denmark) Steen Fladberg (England) Gillian Clark	7–15, 6–15	(silver) Runner-up
1987	World Grand Prix Finals	(England) Gillian Gowers	(Sweden) Stefan Karlsson (Sweden) Maria Bengtsson	8–15, 15–18	(silver) Runner-up

=== International tournament ===
Men's doubles
Year	Tournament	Partner	Opponent	Score	Result
1980	Bells Open	(Scotland) Dan Travers	(England) Ray Stevens (England) Steve Baddeley	9–15, 9–15	(silver) Runner-up
1980	Welsh Open	(Scotland) Dan Travers	(England) Ray Stevens (England) Mike Tredgett	15–7, 11–15, 6–15	(silver) Runner-up
1981	Dutch Open	(Scotland) Dan Travers	(England) Andy Goode (England) Mike Tredgett	15–5, 15–8	(gold) Winner
1981	Portugal International	(England) Kevin Jolly	(England) Ray Stevens (England) Derek Talbot	17–18, 15–12, 12–15	(silver) Runner-up
1981	Bells Open	(Scotland) Dan Travers	(England) Duncan Bridge (England) Martin Dew	18–17, 15–12	(gold) Winner
1982	Scottish Open	(Scotland) Dan Travers	(England) Mark Elliott (England) Donald Burden	15–10, 15–10	(gold) Winner
1982	Dutch Open	(Scotland) Dan Travers	(England) Martin Dew (England) Mike Tredgett	15–11, 5–15, 15–17	(silver) Runner-up
1982	Irish Open	(Scotland) Dan Travers	(Netherlands) Ed Romejin (Netherlands) Bas von Barnau Sijthoff	15–7, 15–8	(gold) Winner
1982	All England Open	(Scotland) Dan Travers	(Malaysia) Jalani Sidek (Malaysia) Razif Sidek	15–8, 9–15, 10–15	(silver) Runner-up
1982	Portugal International	(Scotland) Dan Travers	(England) Darren Hall (England) Ray Stevens	13–15, 8–15	(silver) Runner-up
1982	Victor Cup	(Scotland) Dan Travers	(England) Martin Dew (England) Mike Tredgett	3–15, 2–15	(silver) Runner-up
1982	Canadian Open	(Scotland) Dan Travers	(Sweden) Torbjorn Petterson (Sweden) Lars Wengberg	5–15, 3–15	(silver) Runner-up

Mixed doubles
Year	Tournament	Partner	Opponent	Score	Result
1980	German Open	(Scotland) Christine Heatly	(Denmark) Steen Skovgaard (Denmark) Anne Skovgaard	6–15, 11–15	(silver) Runner-up
1980	English Masters	(England) Karen Chapman	(Indonesia) Christian Hadinata (Indonesia) Imelda Wiguna	6–15, 6–15	(silver) Runner-up
1980	Scottish Open	(Scotland) Joanna Flockhart	(England) Mike Tredgett (England) Karen Chapman	2–15, 2–15	(silver) Runner-up
1981	Scottish Open	(England) Gillian Gilks	(Scotland) Alastair Baker (Scotland) Linda Gardner	15–5, 15–0	(gold) Winner
1981	Swedish Open	(England) Nora Perry	(England) Martin Dew (England) Gillian Clark	15–4, 18–14	(gold) Winner
1981	Bell's Open	(England) Nora Perry	(England) Martin Dew (England) Gillian Gilks	17–16, 15–10	(gold) Winner
1981	Portugal International	(Scotland) Eva Stuart	(Netherlands) Rob Ridder (Netherlands) Marjan Ridder	8–15, 17–14, 15–11	(gold) Winner
1981	India Open	(England) Karen Chapman	(England) Ray Stevens (England) Nora Perry	12–15, 3–15	(silver) Runner-up
1982	Scottish Open	(England) Gillian Gilks	(Denmark) Morten Frost (Denmark) Lene Køppen	18–13, 15–9	(gold) Winner
1982	All England Open	(England) Karen Chapman	(England) Martin Dew (England) Gillian Gilks	10–15, 17–14, 7–15	(silver) Runner-up
1982	India Open	(England) Karen Chapman	(Sweden) Thomas Kihlström (England) Jane Webster	18–14, 15–11	(gold) Winner
1982	Indonesia Open	(England) Karen Chapman	(England) Martin Dew (England) Gillian Gilks	15–5, 8–15, 10–15	(silver) Runner-up
1982	Portugal International	(Scotland) Eva Stuart	(England) Ray Stevens (England) Nora Perry	9–15, 9–15	(silver) Runner-up
1982	Bell's Open	(England) Gillian Gilks	(England) Ray Stevens (England) Nora Perry	15–11, 7–7 retired	(gold) Winner
1982	Canadian Open	(England) Karen Chapman	(Canada) Paul Johnson (Canada) Claire Backhouse	10–15, 15–6, 15–8	(gold) Winner
1984	Scottish Open	(England) Karen Chapman	(England) Dipak Tailor (England) Karen Beckman	15–3, 15–6	(gold) Winner
