= Portugal International =

Badminton championships

The Portugal International in badminton is an international open held annually in Portugal since 1965. It is currently a part of the European Badminton Circuit.

== Previous winners ==
Year	Men's singles	Women's singles	Men's doubles	Women's doubles	Mixed doubles	Ref
1965	(West Germany) Otto Hecker	(Portugal) Peggy Brixhe	(Portugal) Pinto Alves (Portugal) Fernando Pinto	(Portugal) Peggy Brixhe (Portugal) Isabel Salema	(Portugal) Fernando Pinto (Portugal) Peggy Brixhe	
1966	(Switzerland) Anton Sauter	(Portugal) Isabel Rocha	(Portugal) Pinto Alves (Portugal) Fernando Pinto	(Portugal) Conceição Felizardo (Portugal) Isabel Rocha	(Portugal) José Bento (Portugal) Isabel Rocha	
1967	(Portugal) José Bento	(Portugal) Isabel Rocha	(Portugal) Francisco Lomos (Portugal) Fernando Pinto	(Portugal) Conceição Felizardo (Portugal) Isabel Rocha	(Portugal) José Azevedo (Portugal) Isabel Rocha	
1968	(Mexico) Oscar Lujan	no competition	(Portugal) Monge Dias (Mexico) Oscar Lujan	no competition	(Norway) Jan Holtnæs (Portugal) Cecilia Geirithas	
1969	(Norway) Jan Holtnæs	(Portugal) Isabel Rocha	(Norway) Jan Holtnæs (Switzerland) Anton Sauter	no competition	(Norway) Jan Holtnæs (England) Susan Bennett	
1970	(West Germany) Erich Linnemann	(Portugal) Peggy Brixhe	(West Germany) Erich Linnemann (Switzerland) Anton Sauter	(Portugal) Helena Dias (Portugal) Isabel Rocha	(Portugal) José Bento (Portugal) Isabel Rocha	
1971	(Switzerland) Anton Sauter	(Peru) Fina Salazar	(West Germany) Erich Linnemann (Switzerland) Anton Sauter	no competition	(Peru) Alfredo Salazar (Peru) Fina Salazar	
1972	(England) Philip Smith	(England) Nora Gardner	(England) Bill Kidd (England) Eddy Sutton	(England) Nora Gardner (England) Barbara Giles	(England) Bill Kidd (England) Barbara Giles	
1973	(England) Ray Stevens	(England) Margaret Beck	(England) Ray Stevens (England) Elliot Stuart	(England) Nora Gardner (England) Barbara Giles	(England) Ray Stevens (England) Barbara Giles	
1974	(Denmark) Elo Hansen	(England) Barbara Giles	(England) David Hunt (England) Bill Kidd	(England) Barbara Giles (England) Margo Winter	(England) David Hunt (England) Margo Winter	
1975	no competition					
1976	(England) Michael Wilks	(England) Jane Webster	(England) Peter Bullivant (England) Michael Wilks	(England) Kathleen Redhead (England) Jane Webster	(England) Peter Bullivant (England) Kathleen Redhead	
1977	(Pakistan) Tariq Farooq	(England) Karen Bridge	(Sweden) Ola Eriksson (Sweden) Christian Lundberg	(England) Karen Bridge (England) Anne Statt	(England) Tim Stokes (England) Karen Bridge	
1978	(Sweden) Thomas Kihlström	(Netherlands) Marjan Ridder	(Sweden) Bengt Fröman (Sweden) Thomas Kihlström	(England) Paula Kilvington (England) Barbara Sutton	(England) Eddy Sutton (England) Barbara Sutton	
1979	(England) Ray Stevens	(England) Nora Perry	(England) Ray Stevens (England) Elliot Stuart	(England) Nora Perry (Sweden) Eva Stuart	(England) Ray Stevens (England) Nora Perry	
1980	(England) David Eddy	(Sweden) Eva Stuart	(England) David Eddy (England) Elliot Stuart	(England) Gillian Clark (England) Kathleen Redhead	(England) Ray Roge (England) Kathleen Redhead	
1981	(England) Kevin Jolly	(England) Catharine Troke	(England) Ray Stevens (England) Derek Talbot	(Netherlands) Marjan Ridder (Norway) Else Thoresen	(Scotland) Billy Gilliland (Sweden) Eva Stuart	
1982	(England) Ray Stevens	(England) Catharine Troke	(England) Darren Hall (England) Ray Stevens	(England) Nora Perry (England) Catharine Troke	(England) Ray Stevens (England) Nora Perry	
1983	(England) Kevin Jolly	(England) Alison Fisher	(Scotland) Billy Gilliland (Scotland) Alex White	(England) Alison Fisher (England) Jane Shipman	(Scotland) Billy Gilliland (England) Jane Shipman	
1984	(Sweden) Thomas Angarth	(England) Fiona Elliott	(England) Gerry Asquith (England) Elliot Stuart	(England) Fiona Elliott (Sweden) Eva Stuart	(England) Gerry Asquith (England) Fiona Elliott	
1985	(Denmark) Niels Skeby	(England) Fiona Elliott	(Denmark) Poul-Erik Høyer Larsen (Denmark) Niels Skeby	(England) Fiona Elliott (England) J. Elliot	(England) Mark Elliott (England) Fiona Elliott	
1986	(Scotland) Ken Middlemiss	(Sweden) Eva Stuart	(England) David Eddy (England) Elliot Stuart	(Portugal) Margarida Cruz (Portugal) Paula Sousa	(Scotland) Ken Middlemiss (Portugal) Margarida Cruz	
1987	(England) Peter Patel	(Denmark) Pernille Dupont	(England) David Eddy (England) Elliot Stuart	(Denmark) Pernille Dupont (Denmark) Lotte Olsen	(Portugal) José Nascimento (Denmark) Lotte Olsen	
1988	(France) Stéphane Renault	(France) Christelle Mol	(England) Nick Pettman (England) Jon Pulford	(France) Cecilia Brun (France) Christelle Mol	(Portugal) José Nascimento (France) Christelle Mol	
1989	(Norway) Øystein Larsen	(Portugal) Maria José Gomes	(Norway) Øystein Larsen (Norway) Trond Wåland	(Portugal) Maria José Gomes (Portugal) Zamy Gomes	(Denmark) Flemming Glyager (Denmark) Gitte Hansen	
1990	(England) Peter Smith	(England) Julia Mann	(England) Nittin Panesar (England) Peter Smith	(England) Tania Growes (England) Julia Mann	(England) Nittin Panesar (England) Tania Growes	
1991	(England) Anders Nielsen	(Netherlands) Astrid van der Knaap	(England) Andy Goode (England) Glen Milton	(Soviet Union) Elena Denisova (Soviet Union) Marina Yakusheva	(England) Chris Hunt (England) Tracy Dineen	
1992	(Commonwealth of Independent States) Andrey Antropov	(Commonwealth of Independent States) Elena Rybkina	(England) Andy Goode (England) Chris Hunt	(England) Joanne Davies (England) Joanne Wright	(England) Andy Goode (England) Joanne Wright	
1993	(Russia) Andrey Antropov	(Russia) Marina Andrievskaya	(Hong Kong) Chan Kin Ngai (Hong Kong) Wong Wai Lap	(Russia) Marina Andrievskaya (Russia) Marina Yakusheva	(Russia) Nikolai Zuyev (Russia) Marina Yakusheva	
1994	(Denmark) Martin Lundgaard Hansen	(Russia) Irina Yakusheva	(Denmark) Thomas Damgaard (Denmark) Jan Jørgensen	(Denmark) Rikke Olsen (Denmark) Helene Kirkegaard	(Denmark) Martin Lundgaard Hansen (Denmark) Rikke Olsen	
1995	(Denmark) Martin Lundgaard Hansen	(Denmark) Anne Sondergaard	(Denmark) Martin Lundgaard Hansen (Denmark) Henrik Sørensen	(Denmark) Mette Hansen (Denmark) Majken Vange	(Denmark) Peder Nissen (Denmark) Mette Hansen	
1996	(Sweden) Rikard Magnusson	(Sweden) Karolina Ericsson	(England) James Anderson (England) Ian Pearson	(England) Emma Chaffin (England) Tracey Hallam	(England) Nathan Robertson (England) Gail Emms	
1997	(Denmark) Peter Janum	(Scotland) Ann Gibson	(Portugal) Hugo Rodrigues (Portugal) Fernando Silva	(England) Tracey Hallam (England) Karen Peatfield	(Scotland) Russell Hogg (Scotland) Alexis Blanchflower	
1998	(Denmark) Niels Christian Kaldau	(England) Tanya Woodward	(England) James Anderson (England) Ian Pearson	(England) Tracy Dineen (England) Sarah Hardaker	(Canada) Ian Sydie (Canada) Denyse Julien	
1999	(Denmark) Peter Janum	(Russia) Ella Karachkova	(France) Manuel Dubrulle (France) Vincent Laigle	(England) Ella Miles (England) Sara Sankey	(Germany) Björn Siegemund (Germany) Karen Stechmann	
2000	(Sweden) Rikard Magnusson	(Ukraine) Elena Nozdran	(Denmark) Joachim Fischer Nielsen (Denmark) Janek Roos	(Denmark) Britta Andersen (Denmark) Lene Mørk	(Denmark) Mathias Boe (Denmark) Karina Sørensen	
2001	(Germany) Oliver Pongratz	(France) Pi Hongyan	(Germany) Michael Keck (Germany) Joachim Tesche	(England) Ella Miles (England) Sara Sankey	(Germany) Björn Siegemund (Germany) Nicol Pitro	
2002	(Denmark) Niels Christian Kaldau	(England) Julia Mann	(Poland) Michał Łogosz (Poland) Robert Mateusiak	(Denmark) Lene Mørk (Denmark) Helle Nielsen	(Sweden) Fredrik Bergström (Sweden) Jenny Karlsson	
2003	(Denmark) Niels Christian Kaldau	(France) Pi Hongyan	(Denmark) Jim Laugesen (Denmark) Michael Søgaard	(Denmark) Julie Houmann (Denmark) Helle Nielsen	(Sweden) Fredrik Bergström (Sweden) Johanna Persson	
2004	(Russia) Stanislav Pukhov	(England) Tracey Hallam	(England) Simon Archer (England) Robert Blair	(Poland) Kamila Augustyn (Poland) Nadieżda Kostiuczyk	(England) Simon Archer (England) Donna Kellogg	
2005	(France) Arif Rasidi	(Scotland) Yuan Wemyss	(England) Simon Archer (England) Anthony Clark	(Germany) Sandra Marinello (Germany) Kathrin Piotrowski	(England) Anthony Clark (England) Donna Kellogg	
2006	(Denmark) Michael Christensen	(Scotland) Yuan Wemyss	(Denmark) Anders Kristiansen (Denmark) Simon Mollyhus	(England) Jenny Day (England) Liza Parker	(Denmark) Rasmus M. Andersen (Denmark) Mie Schjott-Kristensen	
2007	(Denmark) Peter Mikkelsen	(Netherlands) Judith Meulendijks	(Denmark) Jacob Chemnitz (Denmark) Mikkel Delbo Larsen	(England) Suzanne Rayappan (England) Jenny Wallwork	(Denmark) Rasmus Bonde (Denmark) Christinna Pedersen	
2008	(India) Anand Pawar	(Japan) Kaori Imabeppu	(Netherlands) Ruud Bosch (Netherlands) Koen Ridder	(China) Cai Jiani (China) Zhang Xi	(China) Zhang Yi (China) Cai Jiani	
2009	(Sweden) Magnus Sahlberg	(England) Jill Pittard	(Spain) Ruben Gordown Khosadalina (Spain) Stenny Kusuma	(Sweden) Emelie Lennartsson (Sweden) Emma Wengberg	(Poland) Łukasz Moreń (Poland) Natalia Pocztowiak	
2010	(Malaysia) Kenn Lim	(Portugal) Telma Santos	(Denmark) Martin Kragh (Denmark) Anders Skaarup Rasmussen	(England) Alexandra Langley (England) Lauren Smith	(Croatia) Zvonimir Đurkinjak (Croatia) Staša Poznanović	
2011	(Germany) Sven-Eric Kastens	(France) Sashina Vignes Waran	(Denmark) Niclas Nøhr (Denmark) Mads Pedersen	(England) Alexandra Langley (England) Lauren Smith	(England) Robin Middleton (England) Alexandra Langley	
2012	(Germany) Dieter Domke	(Spain) Beatriz Corrales	(Croatia) Zvonimir Đurkinjak (Denmark) Nikolaj Overgaard	(England) Alexandra Langley (England) Gabrielle White	(England) Marcus Ellis (England) Gabrielle White	
2013	(Malaysia) Ramdan Misbun	(Russia) Ella Diehl	(Denmark) Kim Astrup (Denmark) Anders Skaarup Rasmussen	(Denmark) Lena Grebak (Denmark) Maria Helsbøl	(Germany) Jones Ralfy Jansen (Indonesia) Keshya Nurvita Hanadia	
2014	(Japan) Rei Sato	(Denmark) Sandra-Maria Jensen	(Japan) Kazuki Matsumaru (Japan) Izumi Okoshi	(Wales) Sarah Thomas (Wales) Carissa Turner	(Austria) Roman Zirnwald (Austria) Elisabeth Baldauf	
2015	(Japan) Kazumasa Sakai	(Japan) Sayaka Takahashi	(England) Peter Briggs (England) Tom Wolfenden	(Japan) Ayane Kurihara (Japan) Naru Shinoya	(Sweden) Filip Myhren (Sweden) Emma Wengberg	
2016	(Sri Lanka) Niluka Karunaratne	(Denmark) Mia Blichfeldt	(Malaysia) Ong Yew Sin (Malaysia) Teo Ee Yi	(Malaysia) Goh Yea Ching (Malaysia) Peck Yen Wei	(Denmark) Mikkel Mikkelsen (Denmark) Mai Surrow	
2017	(India) Subhankar Dey	(Japan) Sayaka Takahashi	(Japan) Kazuaki Oshima (Japan) Yuta Yamasaki	(Japan) Chisato Hoshi (Japan) Naru Shinoya	(Finland) Anton Kaisti (Finland) Jenny Nyström	
2018	(Denmark) Rasmus Messerschmidt	(China) Qi Xuefei	(Chinese Taipei) Lu Chen (Chinese Taipei) Ye Hong-wei	(Chinese Taipei) Li Zi-qing (Chinese Taipei) Teng Chun-hsun	(Germany) Peter Käsbauer (Germany) Olga Konon	
2019	(Sweden) Felix Burestedt	(Thailand) Porntip Buranaprasertsuk	(Chinese Taipei) Chang Ko-chi (Chinese Taipei) Lee Fang-jen	(Denmark) Julie Finne-Ipsen (Sweden) Clara Nistad	(Chinese Taipei) Chang Ko-chi (Chinese Taipei) Lee Chih-chen	
2020	(France) Brice Leverdez	(Switzerland) Sabrina Jaquet	(France) Lucas Corvée (France) Brice Leverdez	(Scotland) Lauren Middleton (Scotland) Holly Newall	(Scotland) Christopher Grimley (Scotland) Eleanor O'Donnell	
2021	(Denmark) Ditlev Jæger Holm	(Hungary) Laura Sárosi	(Denmark) Mads Pieler Kolding (Denmark) Frederik Søgaard	(Denmark) Christine Busch (Denmark) Amalie Schulz	(England) Callum Hemming (England) Jessica Pugh	
2022	(Indonesia) Andi Fadel Muhammad	(Chinese Taipei) Hsu Wen-chi	(Chinese Taipei) Su Ching-heng (Chinese Taipei) Ye Hong-wei	(Hong Kong) Yeung Nga Ting (Hong Kong) Yeung Pui Lam	(Chinese Taipei) Ye Hong-wei (Chinese Taipei) Lee Chia-hsin	
2023	(England) Johnnie Torjussen	(Turkey) Neslihan Yiğit	(France) Julien Maio (France) William Villeger	(Turkey) Bengisu Erçetin (Turkey) Nazlıcan İnci	(Denmark) Andreas Søndergaard (Denmark) Iben Bergstein	
2024	(Finland) Joakim Oldorff	(India) Devika Sihag	(Chinese Taipei) Chen Zhi-ray (Chinese Taipei) Lin Yu-chieh	(England) Chloe Birch (England) Estelle van Leeuwen	(England) Ethan van Leeuwen (England) Chloe Birch	
2025	(Israel) Daniil Dubovenko	(Canada) Rachel Chan	(Germany) Bjarne Geiss (Germany) Jan Colin Völker	(France) Margot Lambert (France) Camille Pognante	(France) Grégoire Deschamp (France) Margot Lambert	
2026	(Denmark) Jeppe Bruun	(Brazil) Juliana Viana Vieira	(Denmark) Robert Nebel (Denmark) Jeppe Søby	(Chinese Taipei) Lin Chih-chun (Chinese Taipei) Yang Chu-yun	(Chinese Taipei) Wu Hsuan-yi (Chinese Taipei) Yang Chu-yun	

== Performances by nation ==
As of the 2026 edition

Pos	Nation	MS	WS	MD	WD	XD	Total
1	England	12	16	20	24	22	94
2	Denmark	14	4	12.5	8.5	8.5	47.5
3	Portugal	1	7	5.5	7	6	26.5
4	Sweden	6	3	2	2.5	3.5	17
5	France	3	4	3	2	1.5	13.5
6	Germany	5		3	1	3.5	12.5
7	Russia; CIS; Soviet Union	3	5		2	1	11
8	Chinese Taipei		1	4	2	3	10
9	Scotland	1	3	1	1	3.5	9.5
10	Japan	2	3	2	2		9
11	Norway	2		1.5	0.5	1	5
12	Netherlands		3	1	0.5		4.5
12	Switzerland	2	1	1.5			4.5
14	Malaysia	2		1	1		4
15	China		1		1	1	3
15	India	2	1				3
17	Canada		1			1	1
17	Finland	1				1	2
17	Hong Kong			1	1		2
17	Peru		1			1	2
17	Spain		1	1			2
17	Turkey		1		1		2
23	Croatia			0.5		1	1.5
23	Indonesia	1				0.5	1.5
23	Mexico	1		0.5			1.5
26	Austria					1	1
26	Brazil		1				1
26	Hungary		1				1
26	Israel	1					1
26	Pakistan	1					1
26	Poland					1	1
26	Sri Lanka	1					1
26	Thailand		1				1
26	Ukraine		1				1
26	Wales				1		1
Total		61	60	61	58	61	301
