= Miles Johnson =

English badminton player

Personal information
- Born: 1965 (age 60–61) Aldershot, Hampshire, England

Sport
- Country: England
- Sport: Badminton
Medal record
Men's badminton
Representing England
Commonwealth Games
Gold medal – first place	1990 Auckland	Mixed team
Silver medal – second place	1990 Auckland	Mixed doubles
European Junior Championships
Gold medal – first place	1983 Helsinki	Mixed team

Miles N C Johnson (born 1965) is an English retired male badminton player.

== Badminton career ==
Johnson represented England and won a gold medal in the team event and a silver medal in the mixed doubles with Sara Sankey, at the 1990 Commonwealth Games in Auckland, New Zealand. He also participated in the singles and reached the round of 16 and the men's doubles where he lost in the bronze medal play off.

He won 44 caps for England.
