= Richard Outterside =

English badminton player

Personal information
- Born: 1962 (age 63–64) Thurrock, Essex, England
Medal record
Badminton
Representing England
Commonwealth Games
Gold medal – first place	1986 Edinburgh	team event

Richard J Outterside (born 1962), is an English retired badminton player.

== Badminton career ==
Outterside represented England and won a gold medal in the team event and competed in the mixed doubles, at the 1986 Commonwealth Games in Edinburgh, Scotland.

Other wins include the 1980 English Individual Junior Championship (men's doubles), the 1988 Welsh International (men's doubles) and the 1992 Gibraltar International (men's doubles).
