= Sweden national badminton team =

National badminton team representing Sweden

Sweden
- Association: Svenska Badmintonförbundet (SBF)
- Confederation: BE (Europe)
- President: Stefan Nyberg

BWF ranking
- Current ranking: 25 ▲1 (1 July 2025)
- Highest ranking: 18 (3 October 2013)

Sudirman Cup
- Appearances: 13 (first in 1989)
- Best result: Group stage

Thomas Cup
- Appearances: 11 (first in 1984)
- Best result: Group stage

Uber Cup
- Appearances: 5 (first in 1992)
- Best result: Semi-finals (1992, 1994)

European Mixed Team Championships
- Appearances: 24 (first in 1972)
- Best result: Champions (1992, 1994)

European Men's Team Championships
- Appearances: 8 (first in 2006)
- Best result: Semi-finals (2026)

European Women's Team Championships
- Appearances: 6 (first in 2006)
- Best result: Quarter-finals (2006, 2020)

The Sweden national badminton team (Swedish: Sveriges badmintonlandslag) represents Sweden in international badminton team competitions. It is controlled by Badminton Sweden, the national organization for badminton in the country.

Sweden once dominated the European badminton scene, winning the European Mixed Team Badminton Championships and finishing up as semifinalists twice at the Uber Cup in the 1990s. The national team recently reached the quarterfinals in the 2020 European Women's Team Badminton Championships.

== History ==
Badminton was first introduced to Sweden in the early 1930s by Danes that brought the sport to the country. The national team was formed soon after the formation of the Swedish Badminton Association in 1936.

=== Men's team ===
==== Early years of Thomas Cup qualification (1936–1979) ====
Sweden first competed in qualifying for the first Thomas Cup in 1949. The team consisted of a five man team featuring Nils Jonson, who was the finalist in the men's doubles event at the 1948 All England Championships, Inge Blomberg, national doubles champions Helge Paulsen and Bengt Polling and Knut Malmgren. The team received a bye in the first round but lost in the semi-finals to Denmark 9–0.

In the 1952 Thomas Cup European Zone qualifiers, the team lost to Denmark again but with a better margin of 6–3. In 1955, the team advanced to the finals of the 1955 Thomas Cup European Zone qualifiers by defeating France 9–0 and England 7–2 in the first two rounds. However, the team lost their chances of qualifying for the final tournament when they lost 8–1 to Denmark. In 1958, the team beat Scotland 9–0 in the first round but lost to Denmark 9–0 in the second round. In 1961, the team defeated newcomers Norway 9–0 in Trollhättan but lost their second round match at home to England by a narrow margin. From 1964 to 1979, the team missed their chances of qualifying for the Thomas Cup after losing to Denmark and England in the final rounds of the European Zone.

==== 1980s ====
In the 1982 Thomas Cup European Zone qualifiers, Sweden defeated West Germany 9–0 in Duisburg to advance to the finals but lost 8–1 to Denmark in Copenhagen. In 1984, the team advanced to the knockout stages of the Thomas Cup European Zone qualifiers after finishing first in their group in the group stages but were then defeated by England in the semi-finals. In the third place playoff match, Sweden defeated Scotland 5–0 and qualified for the Thomas Cup for the first time since 1949.

The team were placed into Group B with defending champions China, Denmark and South Korea. The team lost their first match to Denmark 4–1. Their sole victory came from doubles pair Stefan Karlsson and Thomas Kihlström whom won the All England Championships in 1983. The team lost their next matches 5–0 to South Korea and China, finishing last in their group. In 1986, Sweden qualified for the 1986 Thomas Cup after defeating Scotland in the third place playoff. The team were grouped with Indonesia, Denmark and South Korea. Sweden first lost 5–0 to South Korea and Indonesia then 4–1 to Denmark. In the 1988 Thomas Cup qualifiers, Sweden advanced to the semi-finals of the European zone but lost to Denmark 5–0. The team almost failed to qualify for the Thomas Cup when the team trailed 0–2 against the Netherlands in the third place playoff. The team then came back to win the tie 3–2 with a win from Jens Olsson in the third singles match and two wins from the doubles matches. Sweden were placed in Group B with the same teams the team faced in the last Thomas Cup. The team lost to Indonesia 5–0 and then 4–1 to Denmark. In their final match, the team trailed 0–1 but took a surprising 2–1 lead against South Korea with two wins in their second and third singles. The team then lost the tie 2–3 with defeat from their doubles matches.

==== 1990s ====
Sweden advanced to the final of the Thomas Cup European zone qualifiers for the first time after defeating England 3–2 in the semi-finals, granting the team qualification for the 1990 Thomas Cup in Japan. The team then lost 4–1 to Denmark. In the 1990 Thomas Cup, the team finished last in their group after losing to China, Malaysia and South Korea. In 1992, the team qualified for the Thomas Cup after defeating England 4–1 in the European zone semi-finals. Placed in Group A, the team failed to advance to the knockout stages after they lost out to Indonesia 4–1 and China 5–0. The team then won their first ever match in the Thomas Cup when they beat Thailand 3–2 to finish third in the group.

In the 1994 Thomas Cup, the team failed to advance to the knockout stages again after losing out to China and Indonesia but won their last match against Finland 5–0. The team were also eliminated in the group stages of the 1996 Thomas Cup but managed to win a point when they defeated England 4–1. The team also failed to advance to the knockout stages of the Thomas Cup in 1998.

==== Slow decline (2000–present) ====
Although Sweden qualified for the Thomas Cup in 2000 and 2002, the team failed to win against all of their opponents and finished last in the group stages. In 2004, Sweden fell short to the Netherlands in the second round of the Thomas Cup European Zone knockout stage and failed to qualify for the final tournament for the first time since 1982. In 2006, the team took part in the 2006 European Men's Team Badminton Championships but failed to reach the knockout stages after losing 3–2 to Ukraine in the group stages. In the 2008 European Men's Team Badminton Championships, the team went a step higher by advancing to the quarter-finals but could not advance further as they lost to Denmark 3–0.

Sweden's group stage woes continued in 2010 and 2012 with the team losing to Russia and Denmark in the group stages of both editions respectively. In 2014, Sweden showed signs of resurgence after ousting fifth seeds, the Netherlands in the group stages and finishing first in their group to reach the quarter-finals of the European Team Championships. However, the team lost their chances of securing bronze when they lost 3–0 to Finland, making it their first ever defeat against the Finns since their first meeting in 1984. In 2016, the team qualified for the quarter-finals of the European Team Championships as the highest ranked second-placed team in the group stages but lost out to Germany 3–0.

In 2020, Sweden were eliminated in the group stages of the European Team Championships after the team finished second behind England. In 2024, the team failed to qualify for the 2024 European Team Championships after losing 5–0 to England in the European qualifiers in Milton Keynes.

==== Return to the Thomas Cup (2026) ====
In December 2025, Sweden qualified for the 2026 European Men's Team Championships after defeating Azerbaijan 3–1 in their qualifying group final in Portugal. In the 2026 European Men's Team Championships, the team were drawn against France, Germany and host nation Turkey. The team edged past Turkey 3–2 then lost 5–0 to their French counterparts. The team then created an upset when they won a decisive victory against Germany 3–2 to book their place in their first ever semi-final at the European Team Championships. The team won bronze after losing to France 3–0 in the semi-finals. With this result, Sweden qualified for the Thomas Cup, marking it their first appearance since their last appearance in 2002.

=== Women's team ===
Sweden first competed in the qualifying rounds of the inaugural Uber Cup. The team played their first match against Ireland in Dublin and lost 6–1. The two teams met again in the second round of the 1960 Uber Cup European Zone qualifiers with Ireland defeating Sweden 7–0. In December 1968, the team lost 4–3 to Scotland in the first round of the 1969 Uber Cup European Zone qualifiers. The team then failed to qualify for the 1972 Uber Cup after losing in the first round of the European Zone qualifiers to Denmark 6–1. In 1974, the team withdrew from the Uber Cup qualifiers following the absence of team captain Eva Stuart.

==== Debut at the Uber Cup ====
Sweden made their maiden appearance at the Uber Cup in 1986 when the team qualified for the final tournament after defeating Scotland in the third place playoff of the European Zone qualifiers. The team were placed in Group A with China, Denmark and Japan. The team lost 5–0 to China and Japan in their first two matches and then 3–2 to Denmark.

The team failed to qualify for the Uber Cup for a second consecutive time in 1988 after losing to the Netherlands in the tie for third place at the European qualifiers. In the 1990 Uber Cup, the team suffered defeats from China, South Korea and the Netherlands to finish last in their group.

==== Uber Cup semi-finalists (1992–1994) ====
Despite Sweden's disappointing Uber Cup campaign in 1990, the team began showing signs of improvement in 1992 when they defeated England and the Netherlands in the 1992 Uber Cup European Zone knockout stage to qualify for the Uber Cup as winners of the European Zone for the first time. Under coach Kenneth Holmström, Sweden started off with their first win at the Uber Cup by defeating England 3–2. The team then pulled off an upset, beating former champions Japan 4–1 and lost to South Korea by the same margin. With two wins in their record, Sweden advanced to the semi-finals of the Uber Cup for the first time since their debut in 1986. In the semi-finals, the team lost 5–0 against the reigning champions, China.

Sweden managed to replicate their success in the next Uber Cup with two wins against Denmark and Thailand in the group stages. The team faced off against China for a second time since the last Uber Cup semi-final. The team trailed 0–2 against their Chinese opposition with Ye Zhaoying and Han Jingna defeating Lim Xiaoqing and Catrine Bengtsson in the first two singles matches. Sweden then won a point when Christine Magnusson defeated Liu Yuhong in three games. Sweden lost the tie when their first doubles pair of Catrine and Maria Bengtsson lost out to Ge Fei and Gu Jun in a tough three game battle. In the second doubles match, Lim and Magnusson defeated Chen Ying and Wu Yuhong in three games to end the tie 2–3.

==== Recent results (2000–present) ====
Sweden qualified for the 2000 Uber Cup after failing to qualify for the tournament twice in 1996 and 1998. The team finished last in their group after losing to China, South Korea and the Netherlands.

In 2006, Sweden competed in the European Women's Team Championships and reached the quarter-finals after defeating Italy and hosts Greece in the group stages. The team then lost 3–0 to Germany in the quarter-finals. From 2008 to 2012, the team have failed to advance to the knockout stages of the European Women's Team Championships.

In 2024, Sweden failed to qualify for the European Women's Team Championships after the team finished second behind Spain in their qualifying group.

=== Mixed team ===
Sweden hosted the 1972 European Badminton Championships that featured the first edition of the European mixed team event. The team finished in fourth place after achieving a win over Scotland and losing to England, Denmark and West Germany. From 1974 to 1980, the team finished third at the European Mixed Team Championships four times in a row. Sweden went one place up in 1982 when the team finished as runners-up of the European Mixed Team Championships. In 1989, the team competed in the inaugural edition of the Sudirman Cup in Jakarta and finished in fifth place.

==== European champions (1992–1994) ====
In April 1992, Sweden won their first ever title at the European Mixed Team Championships by defeating Scotland 5–0 and Denmark and England 3–2. In 1994, the team defended their title by defeating Denmark 3–2 and winning 5–0 against Scotland and Russia.

==== Decline (2000–present) ====
In the 2002 European Mixed Team Championships, Sweden finished in fifth place of the overall standings. In the 2007 Sudirman Cup, the team were relegated from Level 1 to Level 2 and finished in 16th place, losing 3–1 to Russia. In the 2009 Sudirman Cup, Sweden were relegated once more to Level 3. The team won their match against Australia 3–1 to maintain their status in Level 3.

Since 2019, Sweden has not qualified for the European Mixed Team Championships.

== Competitive record ==
=== Thomas Cup ===
Year	Round	Pos
1949	Did not qualify	
1952	Did not qualify	
1955	Did not qualify	
1958	Did not qualify	
1961	Did not qualify	
1964	Did not qualify	
1967	Did not qualify	
1970	Did not qualify	
1973	Did not qualify	
1976	Did not qualify	
1979	Did not qualify	
1982	Did not qualify	
1984	Group stage	7th
1986	Group stage	7th
1988	Group stage	7th
1990	Group stage	8th
1992	Group stage	7th
1994	Group stage	6th
1996	Group stage	6th
1998	Group stage	5th
2000	Group stage	8th
2002	Group stage	8th
2004	Did not qualify	
2006	Did not qualify	
2008	Did not qualify	
2010	Did not qualify	
2012	Did not enter	
2014	Did not qualify	
2016	Did not qualify	
2018	Did not enter	
2020	Did not qualify	
2022	Did not qualify	
2024	Did not qualify	
2026	Group stage	14th
2028	To be determined	
2030	To be determined	

=== Uber Cup ===
Year	Round	Pos
1957	Did not qualify	
1960	Did not qualify	
1963	Did not qualify	
1966	Did not qualify	
1969	Did not qualify	
1972	Did not qualify	
1975	Did not qualify	
1978	Did not qualify	
1981	Did not qualify	
1984	Did not qualify	
1986	Group stage	7th
1988	Did not qualify	
1990	Group stage	8th
1992	Semi-finals	4th
1994	Semi-finals	4th
1996	Did not qualify	
1998	Did not qualify	
2000	Group stage	8th
2002	Did not qualify	
2004	Did not qualify	
2006	Did not qualify	
2008	Did not qualify	
2010	Did not qualify	
2012	Did not qualify	
2014	Did not enter	
2016	Did not enter	
2018	Did not qualify	
2020	Did not qualify	
2022	Did not qualify	
2024	Did not qualify	
2026	Did not qualify	
2028	To be determined	
2030	To be determined	

=== Sudirman Cup ===
Year	Round	Pos
1989	Group stage	5th
1991	Group stage	5th
1993	Group stage	6th
1995	Group stage	7th
1997	Group stage	5th
1999	Group stage	5th
2001	Group stage	6th
2003	Group stage	6th
2005	Group stage	8th
2007	Group stage	16th
2009	Group stage	23rd
2011	Group stage	21st
2013	Group stage	17th
2015	Did not enter	
2017	Did not enter	
2019	Did not enter	
2021	Did not enter	
2023	Did not enter	
2025	Did not enter	
2027	To be determined	
2029	To be determined	

=== European Team Championships ===
==== Men's team ====
Year	Round	Pos
2006	Group stage	9/16
2008	Quarter-finals	5/8
2010	Group stage	7/14
2012	Group stage	9/16
2014	Quarter-finals	5/8
2016	Quarter-finals	5/8
2018	Did not enter	
2020	Group stage	9/16
2024	Did not qualify	
2026	Semi-finals	4th
2028	To be determined	
2030	To be determined	

==== Women's team ====
Year	Round	Pos
2006	Quarter-finals	5/7
2008	Group stage	8/14
2010	Group stage	19/24
2012	Group stage	9/16
2014	Did not enter	
2016	Did not enter	
2018	Group stage	9/12
2020	Quarter-finals	5/8
2024	Did not qualify	
2026	Did not qualify	
2028	To be determined	
2030	To be determined	

==== Mixed team ====
Year	Round	Pos
1972	Fourth place	4th
1974	Third place	3rd
1976	Third place	3rd
1978	Third place	3rd
1980	Third place	3rd
1982	Runners-up	2nd
1984	Third place	3rd
1986	Third place	3rd
1988	Runners-up	2nd
1990	Runners-up	2nd
1992	Champions	1st
1994	Champions	1st
1996	Runners-up	2nd
1998	Third place	3rd
2000	Fourth place	4th
2002	Group stage	5th
2004	Group stage	7th
2006	Group stage	7th
2008	Group stage	11th
2009	Group stage	9/16
2011	Group stage	9/16
2013	Group stage	9/16
2015	Group stage	9/11
2017	Quarter-finals	5/8
2019	Did not qualify	
2021	Did not qualify	
2023	Did not qualify	
2025	Did not qualify	
2027	To be determined	
2029	To be determined	

=== FISU World University Games ===
==== Mixed team ====
Year	Round	Pos
2007	Did not enter	
2011	Did not enter	
2013	Did not enter	
2015	Did not enter	
2017	Group stage	24th
2021	Did not enter	
2025	Did not enter	

=== World University Team Championships ===
==== Mixed team ====
Year	Round	Pos
2008	Did not enter	
2010	Did not enter	
2012	Did not enter	
2014	Did not enter	
2016	Did not enter	
2018	Did not enter	

**Red border color indicates tournament was held on home soil.

== Junior competitive record ==
=== Suhandinata Cup ===
Year	Round	Pos
2000	Group stage	16th
2002	Group stage	11th
2004	Group stage	13th
2006	Did not enter	
2007	Did not enter	
2008	Did not enter	
2009	Did not enter	
2010	Did not enter	
2011	Did not enter	
2012	Did not enter	
2013	Did not enter	
2014	Did not enter	
2015	Group stage	18th
2016	Group stage	18th
2017	Group stage	10th
2018	Group stage	13th
2019	Group stage	27th
2022	Group stage	21st
2023	Did not enter	
2024	Did not enter	
2025	To be determined	

=== European Junior Team Championships ===
==== Mixed team ====
Year	Round	Pos
1975	Third place	3rd
1977	Third place	3rd
1979	Third place	3rd
1981	Third place	3rd
1983	Third place	3rd
1985	Third place	3rd
1987	Third place	3rd
1989	Third place	3rd
1991	Quarter-finals	5th
1993	Runners-up	2nd
1995	Runners-up	2nd
1997	Quarter-finals	7th
1999	Quarter-finals	6th
2001	Quarter-finals	5th
2003	Quarter-finals	7th
2005	Quarter-finals	5th
2007	Group stage	11th
2009	Group stage	8/14
2011	Group stage	9/16
2013	Group stage	9/14
2015	Group stage	9/16
2017	Group stage	9/12
2018	Group stage	9/16
2020	Quarter-finals	5/8
2022	Quarter-finals	5/8
2024	Group stage	9/16

**Red border color indicates tournament was held on home soil.

== Coaches ==
The following shows a list of coaches for the Sweden national badminton team.

=== Current coaches ===
- (Germany) Oliver Pongratz (August 2020–2023; December 2025–present)
- (Sweden) Amanda Högström (2020–present)
- (Sweden) Per-Henrik Croona (June 2008–present)
- (Sweden) Albin Hjelm (2024–present)
- (Sweden) Anton Lundén (October 2025–present)
- (Sweden) Mattias Borg (October 2025–present)

=== Former coaches ===
- (Sweden) Bertil Jönsson (October 1966–1973)
- (Sweden) Carl Christian Overgård (1973–1986)
- (Sweden) Ulf Borgström (June 1976–1983)
- (Sweden) Roland Elander (1982–1985)
- (Sweden) Kenneth Holmström (1983–1995)
- (Sweden) Lars Sologub (1985–1989; 1991–1996)
- (Sweden) Jan-Olof Jacobsson (1991–1995)
- (Sweden) Claes Johansson (March 1996–September 2000)
- (Sweden) Goran Sterner (1993)
- (Sweden) Jonas Herrgårdh (1994–1996; 2005–2008; 2011–2019)
- (Sweden) Asger Madsen (2005–2007)
- (England) Andrew Smith (2019–2020)
- (Sweden) Tim Foo (2019–2020)
- (Indonesia) (Sweden) Andy Hartono Tandaputra (2019–2020)
- (Sweden) Henri Hurskainen (May 2020–September 2025)

== Players ==
=== Current squad ===
As of 1 July 2025

==== Men's team ====
Name	DoB/Age	Ranking of event		
Name	DoB/Age	MS	MD	XD
Gustav Björkler	29 March 2002 (age 24)	97	-	-
Romeo Makboul	18 April 2006 (age 20)	344	-	-
Filip Karlborg	16 February 2002 (age 24)	-	93	275
Mio Molin	30 March 2005 (age 21)	-	93	732
Ludwig Axelsson	3 August 2003 (age 22)	-	163	448
Jacob Ekman	22 April 2001 (age 25)	-	163	130
Jesper Borgstedt	7 May 2001 (age 25)	-	207	492
Max Svensson	8 February 2002 (age 24)	-	207	152
Johan Azelius	7 December 2000 (age 25)	852	-	-
Tim Mörk	3 July 2003 (age 22)	541	-	-

==== Women's team ====
Name	DoB/Age	Ranking of event		
Name	DoB/Age	WS	WD	XD
Mirjam Lindgärde	21 August 2003 (age 22)	200	-	-
Cecilia Wang	3 August 2002 (age 23)	239	-	-
Moa Sjöö	30 May 1997 (age 28)	-	44	-
Tilda Sjöö	10 July 2000 (age 25)	-	44	275
Ronak Olyaee	8 March 1999 (age 27)	-	229	492
Romina Olyaee	8 March 1999 (age 27)	-	229	-
Fiona Hallberg	31 May 2002 (age 23)	-	455	513
Elin Öhling	8 February 1996 (age 30)	-	455	754
Malena Norrman	14 December 2000 (age 25)	-	171	448
Jessica Silvennoinen	22 September 2003 (age 22)	-	464	1013

=== Previous squads ===
==== Thomas Cup ====
- 1984, 1986, 1988, 1990, 1992

==== Uber Cup ====
- 1986, 1990, 1992

==== European Team Championships ====
- Men's team: 2020
- Women's team: 2020

== See also ==
- Swedish National Badminton Championships
