= 1990 Thomas & Uber Cup =

Biennial international badminton team championship

1990 Thomas & Uber Cup トマス杯&ユーバー杯1990

Tournament details
- Dates: 25 May – 3 June 1990
- Edition: 16th (Thomas Cup); 13th (Uber Cup)
- Level: International
- Nations: 8 (Thomas Cup); 8 (Uber Cup)
- Venue: Nagoya Tsuyuhashi Sports Center; Tokyo Metropolitan Gymnasium
- Location: Nagoya and Tokyo, Japan
- Official website: bwfthomasubercups.com

The 1990 Thomas & Uber Cup was the 16th tournament of the Thomas Cup, and the 13th tournament of the Uber Cup, which are the major international team competitions in world badminton. The 1990 final stage was held in Tokyo, Japan, in May 1990.

== Host city selection ==
Singapore, Japan and South Korea submitted bids to host the tournament. The host selection was decided in May 1988, in Kuala Lumpur, at the same time with the 1988 Thomas & Uber Cup. At the general meeting, Tokyo, Japan, was selected to host the tournament.

== Qualification ==
Japan qualified automatically for both the Thomas Cup and the Uber Cup as hosts. China also qualified for both the Thomas Cup and the Uber Cup as trophy holders.

=== Thomas Cup ===
| Means of qualification | Date | Venue | Slot | Qualified teams |
|---|---|---|---|---|
| Host country | 28 November 1988 | Tokyo | 1 | Japan |
| 1988 Thomas Cup | 23 May – 4 June 1988 | Kuala Lumpur | 1 | China |
| Asian Zone | 18 – 25 February 1990 | Kuala Lumpur | 3 | Indonesia |
| Asian Zone | 18 – 25 February 1990 | Kuala Lumpur | 3 | Malaysia |
| Asian Zone | 18 – 25 February 1990 | Kuala Lumpur | 3 | South Korea |
| European Zone | 21 – 25 February 1990 | Villach | 3 | Denmark |
| European Zone | 21 – 25 February 1990 | Villach | 3 | England |
| European Zone | 21 – 25 February 1990 | Villach | 3 | Sweden |
| Total | | | 8 | |

=== Uber Cup ===
| Means of qualification | Date | Venue | Slot | Qualified teams |
|---|---|---|---|---|
| Host country | 28 November 1988 | Tokyo | 1 | Japan |
| 1988 Uber Cup | 23 May – 4 June 1988 | Kuala Lumpur | 1 | China |
| Australasian-American Zone | 18 – 25 February 1990 | Kuala Lumpur | 2 | Indonesia |
| Australasian-American Zone | 18 – 25 February 1990 | Kuala Lumpur | 2 | South Korea |
| European Zone | 21 – 25 February 1990 | Villach | 4 | Denmark |
| European Zone | 21 – 25 February 1990 | Villach | 4 | England |
| European Zone | 21 – 25 February 1990 | Villach | 4 | Netherlands |
| European Zone | 21 – 25 February 1990 | Villach | 4 | Sweden |
| Total | | | 8 | |

== Venues ==
There were two venues used to host the 1990 Thomas and Uber Cup. In the group stage, all matches were played at the Nagoya Tsuyuhashi Sports Center in Nagoya. Matches for the knockout stage were played at the Tokyo Metropolitan Gymnasium in Tokyo.

| Group stage | Knockout stage | 1990 Thomas & Uber Cup is located in Japan |
| Nagoya | Tokyo | 1990 Thomas & Uber Cup is located in Japan |
| Nagoya Tsuyuhashi Sports Center | Tokyo Metropolitan Gymnasium | 1990 Thomas & Uber Cup is located in Japan |

== Medal summary ==
=== Medalists ===
| Event | Gold | Silver | Bronze |
|---|---|---|---|
| Thomas Cup | China | Malaysia | Denmark |
| Thomas Cup | China | Malaysia | Indonesia |
| Uber Cup | China | South Korea | Indonesia |
| Uber Cup | China | South Korea | Japan |

=== Medal table ===
* Host nation (Japan)

| Rank | Nation | Gold | Silver | Bronze | Total |
|---|---|---|---|---|---|
| 1 | China | 2 | 0 | 0 | 2 |
| 2 | Malaysia | 0 | 1 | 0 | 1 |
| 2 | South Korea | 0 | 1 | 0 | 1 |
| 4 | Indonesia | 0 | 0 | 2 | 2 |
| 5 | Denmark | 0 | 0 | 1 | 1 |
| 5 | Japan* | 0 | 0 | 1 | 1 |
| Totals (6 entries) | | 2 | 2 | 4 | 8 |

== Thomas Cup ==
=== Group stage ===
==== Group A ====
| Pos | Team | Pld | W | L | GF | GA | GD | PF | PA | PD | Pts | Qualification |
|---|---|---|---|---|---|---|---|---|---|---|---|---|
| 1 | China | 3 | 3 | 0 | 30 | 2 | +28 | 470 | 271 | +199 | 3 | Advance to semi-finals |
| 2 | Malaysia | 3 | 2 | 1 | 19 | 15 | +4 | 414 | 382 | +32 | 2 | Advance to semi-finals |
| 3 | South Korea | 3 | 1 | 2 | 11 | 22 | −11 | 361 | 429 | −68 | 1 | |
| 4 | Sweden | 3 | 0 | 3 | 6 | 27 | −21 | 308 | 471 | −163 | 0 | |

Source: The Straits Times

25 May 1990
11:00 UTC+9

| China | 5–0 | Sweden |
Report

Tsuyuhashi Sports Center, Nagoya

25 May 1990
16:00 UTC+9

| Malaysia | 4–1 | South Korea |
Report

Tsuyuhashi Sports Center, Nagoya

26 May 1990
11:00 UTC+9

| China | 5–0 | South Korea |
Report

Tsuyuhashi Sports Center, Nagoya

26 May 1990
16:00 UTC+9

| Malaysia | 5–0 | Sweden |
Report

Tsuyuhashi Sports Center, Nagoya

27 May 1990
11:00 UTC+9

| South Korea | 3–2 | Sweden |
Report

Tsuyuhashi Sports Center, Nagoya

27 May 1990
16:00 UTC+9

| China | 5–0 | Malaysia |
Report

Tsuyuhashi Sports Center, Nagoya

==== Group B ====
| Pos | Team | Pld | W | L | GF | GA | GD | PF | PA | PD | Pts | Qualification |
|---|---|---|---|---|---|---|---|---|---|---|---|---|
| 1 | Indonesia | 3 | 3 | 0 | 28 | 6 | +22 | 486 | 278 | +208 | 3 | Advance to semi-finals |
| 2 | Denmark | 3 | 2 | 1 | 19 | 14 | +5 | 417 | 373 | +44 | 2 | Advance to semi-finals |
| 3 | Japan | 3 | 1 | 2 | 12 | 23 | −11 | 358 | 466 | −108 | 1 | |
| 4 | England | 3 | 0 | 3 | 9 | 25 | −16 | 324 | 468 | −144 | 0 | |

Source: The Straits Times

25 May 1990
11:00 UTC+9

| Indonesia | 5–0 | England |
Report

Tsuyuhashi Sports Center, Nagoya

25 May 1990
16:00 UTC+9

| Denmark | 4–1 | Japan |
Report

Tsuyuhashi Sports Center, Nagoya

26 May 1990
11:00 UTC+9

| Denmark | 4–1 | England |
Report

Tsuyuhashi Sports Center, Nagoya

26 May 1990
16:00 UTC+9

| Indonesia | 5–0 | Japan |
Report

Tsuyuhashi Sports Center, Nagoya

27 May 1990
11:00 UTC+9

| Indonesia | 4–1 | Denmark |
Report

Tsuyuhashi Sports Center, Nagoya

27 May 1990
16:00 UTC+9

| England | 2–3 | Japan |
Report

Tsuyuhashi Sports Center, Nagoya

=== Knockout stage ===
==== Bracket ====
Semi-finals
China | 5
Denmark | 0
Malaysia | 3
Indonesia | 2

Final
China | 4
Malaysia | 1

==== Semi-finals ====
30 May 1990
16:00 UTC+9

| China | 5–0 | Denmark |
Report

Tokyo Metropolitan Gymnasium, Tokyo

31 May 1990
16:00 UTC+9

| Malaysia | 3–2 | Indonesia |
Report

Tokyo Metropolitan Gymnasium, Tokyo

==== Final ====
3 June 1990
16:00 UTC+9

| China | 4–1 | Malaysia |
Report

Tokyo Metropolitan Gymnasium, Tokyo

1990 Thomas Cup winner

China
Fourth title

== Uber Cup ==
=== Group stage ===
==== Group A ====
| Pos | Team | Pld | W | L | GF | GA | GD | PF | PA | PD | Pts | Qualification |
|---|---|---|---|---|---|---|---|---|---|---|---|---|
| 1 | Indonesia | 3 | 3 | 0 | 30 | 5 | +25 | 427 | 259 | +168 | 3 | Advance to semi-finals |
| 2 | Japan | 3 | 2 | 1 | 20 | 16 | +4 | 388 | 317 | +71 | 2 | Advance to semi-finals |
| 3 | England | 3 | 1 | 2 | 12 | 24 | −12 | 319 | 407 | −88 | 1 | |
| 4 | Denmark | 3 | 0 | 3 | 8 | 25 | −17 | 243 | 394 | −151 | 0 | |

Source: The Straits Times

25 May 1990
11:00 UTC+9

| Japan | 4–1 | Denmark |
Report

Tsuyuhashi Sports Center, Nagoya

25 May 1990
16:00 UTC+9

| Indonesia | 5–0 | England |
Report

Tsuyuhashi Sports Center, Nagoya

26 May 1990
11:00 UTC+9

| Denmark | 3–2 | England |
Report

Tsuyuhashi Sports Center, Nagoya

26 May 1990
16:00 UTC+9

| Indonesia | 5–0 | Japan |
Report

Tsuyuhashi Sports Center, Nagoya

27 May 1990
11:00 UTC+9

| Indonesia | 5–0 | Denmark |
Report

Tsuyuhashi Sports Center, Nagoya

27 May 1990
16:00 UTC+9

| Japan | 5–0 | England |
Report

Tsuyuhashi Sports Center, Nagoya

==== Group B ====
| Pos | Team | Pld | W | L | GF | GA | GD | PF | PA | PD | Pts | Qualification |
|---|---|---|---|---|---|---|---|---|---|---|---|---|
| 1 | South Korea | 3 | 3 | 0 | 28 | 6 | +22 | 397 | 210 | +187 | 3 | Advance to semi-finals |
| 2 | China | 3 | 2 | 1 | 25 | 9 | +16 | 379 | 218 | +161 | 2 | Advance to semi-finals |
| 3 | Netherlands | 3 | 1 | 2 | 8 | 24 | −16 | 222 | 357 | −135 | 1 | |
| 4 | Sweden | 3 | 0 | 3 | 5 | 27 | −22 | 177 | 390 | −213 | 0 | |

Source: The Straits Times

25 May 1990
11:00 UTC+9

| China | 5–0 | Sweden |
Report

Tsuyuhashi Sports Center, Nagoya

25 May 1990
16:00 UTC+9

| South Korea | 5–0 | Netherlands |
Report

Tsuyuhashi Sports Center, Nagoya

26 May 1990
11:00 UTC+9

| South Korea | 5–0 | Sweden |
Report

Tsuyuhashi Sports Center, Nagoya

26 May 1990
16:00 UTC+9

| China | 5–0 | Netherlands |
Report

Tsuyuhashi Sports Center, Nagoya

27 May 1990
11:00 UTC+9

| Netherlands | 3–2 | Sweden |
Report

Tsuyuhashi Sports Center, Nagoya

27 May 1990
16:00 UTC+9

| China | 1–4 | South Korea |
Report

Tsuyuhashi Sports Center, Nagoya

=== Knockout stage ===
==== Bracket ====
Semi-finals
Indonesia | 0
China | 5
Japan | 1
South Korea | 4

Final
China | 3
South Korea | 2

==== Semi-finals ====
30 May 1990
11:00 UTC+9

| China | 5–0 | Indonesia |
Report

Tokyo Metropolitan Gymnasium, Tokyo

31 May 1990
11:00 UTC+9

| South Korea | 4–1 | Japan |
Report

Tokyo Metropolitan Gymnasium, Tokyo

==== Final ====
2 June 1990
11:00 UTC+9

| China | 3–2 | South Korea |
Report

Tokyo Metropolitan Gymnasium, Tokyo

1990 Uber Cup winner

China
Fourth title
