= 1990 Uber Cup group stage =

Badminton team tournament in Japan

The 1990 Uber Cup group stage was held at the Tsuyuhashi Sports Center in Nagoya, Japan, from 25 to 27 May 1990.

The group stage was first stage of the tournament where only the two highest-placing teams in each of the two groups advanced to the knockout stage.

== Draw ==
The original draw for the tournament was conducted on 15 March 1990. The 8 teams will be drawn into two groups each containing four teams.

=== Group composition ===
Group
Group A	Group B
Denmark; England; Indonesia; Japan (Host)	China; South Korea; Netherlands; Sweden

== Group A ==
Pos	Team	Pld	W	L	GF	GA	GD	PF	PA	PD	Pts	Qualification
1	Indonesia	3	3	0	30	5	+25	427	259	+168	3	Advance to semi-finals
2	Japan	3	2	1	20	16	+4	388	317	+71	2	Advance to semi-finals
3	England	3	1	2	12	24	−12	319	407	−88	1	
4	Denmark	3	0	3	8	25	−17	243	394	−151	0	

Source: The Straits Times

=== Japan vs Denmark ===
Japan
4
Tsuyuhashi Sports Center
25 May 1990, 11:00 UTC+9

Denmark
1

			1	2	3
1	(Japan) (Denmark)	Aiko Miyamura; Charlotte Hattens	11; 3	11; 6
2	(Japan) (Denmark)	Harumi Kohara; Helle Andersen	11; 8	11; 0
3	(Japan) (Denmark)	Hisako Mizui; Dorte Kjær	10; 12	11; 1	11; 5
4	(Japan) (Denmark)	Kimiko Jinnai / Takako Shinki; Dorte Kjær / Nettie Nielsen	8; 15	17; 18
5	(Japan) (Denmark)	Tomomi Matsuo / Kyoko Sasage; Grete Mogensen / Lotte Olsen	15; 2	15; 2

=== Indonesia vs England ===
Indonesia
5
Tsuyuhashi Sports Center
25 May 1990, 16:00 UTC+9

England
0

			1	2	3
1	(Indonesia) (England)	Susi Susanti; Fiona Smith	11; 5	11; 12	11; 6
2	(Indonesia) (England)	Minarti Timur; Helen Troke	11; 3	11; 0
3	(Indonesia) (England)	Sarwendah Kusumawardhani; Joanne Muggeridge	7; 11	12; 9	11; 8
4	(Indonesia) (England)	Erma Sulistianingsih / Rosiana Tendean; Gillian Clark / Gillian Gowers	15; 6	15; 12
5	(Indonesia) (England)	Verawaty Fadjrin / Yanti Kusmiati; Cheryl Johnson / Julie Munday	15; 10	15; 11

=== England vs Denmark ===
England
3
Tsuyuhashi Sports Center
26 May 1990, 11:00 UTC+9

Denmark
2

			1	2	3
1	(England) (Denmark)	Fiona Smith; Charlotte Hattens	11; 8	11; 7
2	(England) (Denmark)	Joanne Muggeridge; Helle Andersen	11; 6	11; 1
3	(England) (Denmark)	Suzanne Louis; Grete Mogensen	6; 11	9; 12
4	(England) (Denmark)	Gillian Clark / Gillian Gowers; Dorte Kjær / Nettie Nielsen	15; 7	15; 5
5	(England) (Denmark)	Cheryl Johnson / Julie Munday; Grete Mogensen / Lotte Olsen	9; 15	15; 10	13; 18

=== Indonesia vs Japan ===
Indonesia
5
Tsuyuhashi Sports Center
26 May 1990, 16:00 UTC+9

Japan
0

			1	2	3
1	(Indonesia) (Japan)	Susi Susanti; Aiko Miyamura	11; 4	11; 4
2	(Indonesia) (Japan)	Minarti Timur; Harumi Kohara	11; 6	11; 8
3	(Indonesia) (Japan)	Sarwendah Kusumawardhani; Hisako Mizui	11; 7	4; 11	11; 5
4	(Indonesia) (Japan)	Erma Sulistianingsih / Rosiana Tendean; Kimiko Jinnai / Takako Shinki	12; 15	18; 13	15; 13
5	(Indonesia) (Japan)	Verawaty Fadjrin / Yanti Kusmiati; Tomomi Matsuo / Kyoko Sasage	15; 8	15; 1

=== Indonesia vs Denmark ===
Indonesia
5
Tsuyuhashi Sports Center
27 May 1990, 11:00 UTC+9

Denmark
0

			1	2	3
1	(Indonesia) (Denmark)	Susi Susanti; Charlotte Hattens	11; 2	11; 2
2	(Indonesia) (Denmark)	Minarti Timur; Helle Andersen	11; 2	11; 3
3	(Indonesia) (Denmark)	Lilik Sudarwati; Dorte Kjær	11; 6	8; 11	11; 5
4	(Indonesia) (Denmark)	Erma Sulistianingsih / Rosiana Tendean; Dorte Kjær / Nettie Nielsen	15; 12	15; 9
5	(Indonesia) (Denmark)	Verawaty Fadjrin / Lili Tampi; Grete Mogensen / Lotte Olsen	18; 13	15; 6

=== Japan vs England ===
Japan
5
Tsuyuhashi Sports Center
27 May 1990, 16:00 UTC+9

England
0

			1	2	3
1	(Japan) (England)	Aiko Miyamura; Fiona Smith	11; 3	5; 11	11; 4
2	(Japan) (England)	Harumi Kohara; Helen Troke	11; 5	11; 5
3	(Japan) (England)	Hisako Mizui; Joanne Muggeridge	11; 12	11; 1	11; 7
4	(Japan) (England)	Kimiko Jinnai / Takako Shinki; Gillian Clark / Gillian Gowers	17; 18	18; 15	15; 10
5	(Japan) (England)	Tomomi Matsuo / Kyoko Sasage; Cheryl Johnson / Julie Munday	15; 4	15; 5

== Group B ==
Pos	Team	Pld	W	L	GF	GA	GD	PF	PA	PD	Pts	Qualification
1	South Korea	3	3	0	28	6	+22	397	210	+187	3	Advance to semi-finals
2	China	3	2	1	25	9	+16	379	218	+161	2	Advance to semi-finals
3	Netherlands	3	1	2	8	24	−16	222	357	−135	1	
4	Sweden	3	0	3	5	27	−22	177	390	−213	0	

Source: The Straits Times

=== China vs Sweden ===
China
5
Tsuyuhashi Sports Center
25 May 1990, 11:00 UTC+9

Sweden
0

			1	2	3
1	(China) (Sweden)	Tang Jiuhong; Catrine Bengtsson	11; 0	9; 12	11; 0
2	(China) (Sweden)	Huang Hua; Margit Borg	11; 0	11; 0
3	(China) (Sweden)	Zhou Lei; Astrid Crabo	11; 1	11; 1
4	(China) (Sweden)	Lai Caiqin / Yao Fen; Catrine Bengtsson / Maria Bengtsson	15; 8	17; 15
5	(China) (Sweden)	Guan Weizhen / Shi Fangjing; Margit Borg / Karin Ericsson	15; 0	15; 4

=== South Korea vs Netherlands ===
South Korea
5
Tsuyuhashi Sports Center
25 May 1990, 16:00 UTC+9

Netherlands
0

			1	2	3
1	(South Korea) (Netherlands)	Lee Young-suk; Eline Coene	9; 12	11; 7	12; 9
2	(South Korea) (Netherlands)	Lee Jung-mi; Erica van Dijck	11; 7	11; 4
3	(South Korea) (Netherlands)	Gil Young-ah; Maaike de Boer	11; 2	11; 1
4	(South Korea) (Netherlands)	Chung Myung-hee / Chung So-young; Eline Coene / Erica van Dijck	15; 6	15; 2
5	(South Korea) (Netherlands)	Gil Young-ah / Hwang Hye-young; Maaike de Boer / Sonja Mellink	15; 0	15; 3

=== South Korea vs Sweden ===
South Korea
5
Tsuyuhashi Sports Center
26 May 1990, 11:00 UTC+9

Sweden
0

			1	2	3
1	(South Korea) (Sweden)	Lee Young-suk; Catrine Bengtsson	11; 2	11; 6
2	(South Korea) (Sweden)	Lee Jung-mi; Astrid Crabo	11; 7	11; 5
3	(South Korea) (Sweden)	Gil Young-ah; Karin Ericsson	11; 0	11; 4
4	(South Korea) (Sweden)	Chung Myung-hee / Hwang Hye-young; Maria Bengtsson / Karin Ericsson	15; 5	15; 5
5	(South Korea) (Sweden)	Chung So-young / Shim Eun-jung; Margit Borg / Emma Edbom	15; 5	15; 2

=== China vs Netherlands ===
China
5
Tsuyuhashi Sports Center
26 May 1990, 16:00 UTC+9

Netherlands
0

			1	2	3
1	(China) (Netherlands)	Tang Jiuhong; Eline Coene	11; 0	11; 1
2	(China) (Netherlands)	Huang Hua; Erica van Dijck	11; 7	11; 2
3	(China) (Netherlands)	Zhou Lei; Sonja Mellink	11; 6	11; 1
4	(China) (Netherlands)	Lai Caiqin / Yao Fen; Eline Coene / Erica van Dijck	15; 3	15; 12
5	(China) (Netherlands)	Guan Weizhen / Shi Fangjing; Maaike de Boer / Sonja Mellink	15; 2	15; 8

=== Netherlands vs Sweden ===
Netherlands
3
Tsuyuhashi Sports Center
27 May 1990, 11:00 UTC+9

Sweden
2

			1	2	3
1	(Netherlands) (Sweden)	Eline Coene; Catrine Bengtsson	11; 6	11; 7
2	(Netherlands) (Sweden)	Erica van Dijck; Astrid Crabo	12; 11	11; 4
3	(Netherlands) (Sweden)	Sonja Mellink; Maria Bengtsson	11; 0	5; 11	8; 11
4	(Netherlands) (Sweden)	Maaike de Boer / Erica van Dijck; Maria Bengtsson / Karin Ericsson	15; 4	15; 9
5	(Netherlands) (Sweden)	Eline Coene / Sonja Mellink; Catrine Bengtsson / Maria Bengtsson	12; 15	16; 17

=== China vs South Korea ===
China
1
Tsuyuhashi Sports Center
27 May 1990, 16:00 UTC+9

South Korea
4

			1	2	3
1	(China) (South Korea)	Tang Jiuhong; Hwang Hye-young	11; 3	7; 11	7; 11
2	(China) (South Korea)	Huang Hua; Lee Young-suk	7; 11	3; 11
3	(China) (South Korea)	Zhou Lei; Lee Heung-soon	9; 11	11; 1	4; 11
4	(China) (South Korea)	Lai Caiqin / Yao Fen; Chung Myung-hee / Chung So-young	15; 10	8; 15	4; 15
5	(China) (South Korea)	Guan Weizhen / Shi Fangjing; Gil Young-ah / Shim Eun-jung	15; 13	15; 12
