= 1988 Uber Cup group stage =

Badminton team Tournament in Kuala Lumpur

The 1988 Uber Cup group stage was held at Stadium Negara in Kuala Lumpur, Malaysia, from 23 to 28 May 1988.

The group stage was first stage of the tournament where only the two highest-placing teams in each of the two groups advanced to the knockout stage.

== Draw ==
The original draw for the tournament was conducted on 18 March 1988. The 8 teams will be drawn into two groups each containing four teams.

=== Group composition ===
Group
Group A	Group B
China; Denmark; Japan; Netherlands	England; Indonesia; Malaysia (Host); South Korea

== Group A ==
Pos	Team	Pld	W	L	GF	GA	GD	PF	PA	PD	Pts	Qualification
1	China	3	3	0	28	2	+26	374	137	+237	3	Advance to semi-finals
2	Japan	3	1	2	14	20	−6	308	355	−47	1	Advance to semi-finals
3	Denmark	3	1	2	11	22	−11	280	347	−67	1	
4	Netherlands	3	1	2	13	22	−9	260	383	−123	1	

Source: The Straits Times

=== Denmark vs Netherlands ===
Denmark
3
Stadium Negara
23 May 1988, 19:30 UTC+8

Netherlands
2

			1	2	3
1	(Denmark) (Netherlands)	Kirsten Larsen; Eline Coene	12; 9	11; 8
2	(Denmark) (Netherlands)	Christina Bostofte; Astrid van der Knaap	10; 12	3; 11
3	(Denmark) (Netherlands)	Lisbet Stuer-Lauridsen; Monique Hoogland	6; 11	11; 7	5; 11
4	(Denmark) (Netherlands)	Dorte Kjær / Nettie Nielsen; Maaike de Boer / Paula Rip	15; 5	15; 2
5	(Denmark) (Netherlands)	Grete Mogensen / Gitte Paulsen; Eline Coene / Monique Hoogland	15; 2	12; 15	15; 12

=== China vs Japan ===
China
4
Stadium Negara
24 May 1988, 19:30 UTC+8

Japan
1

			1	2	3
1	(China) (Japan)	Li Lingwei; Sumiko Kitada	7; 11	10; 12
2	(China) (Japan)	Han Aiping; Yoko Koizumi	12; 11	11; 1
3	(China) (Japan)	Gu Jiaming; Kumiko Kitamoto	11; 4	11; 3
4	(China) (Japan)	Guan Weizhen / Lin Ying; Sumiko Kitada / Yoko Koizumi	15; 5	15; 5
5	(China) (Japan)	Lao Yujing / Zheng Yuli; Kimiko Jinnai / Hisako Takamine	15; 10	15; 3

=== Japan vs Denmark ===
Japan
3
Stadium Negara
25 May 1988, 19:30 UTC+8

Denmark
2

			1	2	3
1	(Japan) (Denmark)	Sumiko Kitada; Kirsten Larsen	11; 4	12; 11
2	(Japan) (Denmark)	Kimiko Jinnai; Pernille Nedergaard	11; 8	11; 7
3	(Japan) (Denmark)	Yoko Koizumi; Charlotte Hattens	8; 11	0; 11
4	(Japan) (Denmark)	Sumiko Kitada / Yoko Koizumi; Dorte Kjær / Nettie Nielsen	5; 15	15; 10	13; 15
5	(Japan) (Denmark)	Kimiko Jinnai / Hisako Takamine; Grete Mogensen / Gitte Paulsen	15; 5	15; 5

=== China vs Netherlands ===
China
5
Stadium Negara
26 May 1988, 19:30 UTC+8

Netherlands
0

			1	2	3
1	(China) (Netherlands)	Li Lingwei; Eline Coene	11; 0	11; 0
2	(China) (Netherlands)	Han Aiping; Astrid van der Knaap	11; 1	11; 6
3	(China) (Netherlands)	Gu Jiaming; Monique Hoogland	11; 0	11; 3
4	(China) (Netherlands)	Guan Weizhen / Lin Ying; Paula Rip / Astrid van der Knaap	15; 2	15; 2
5	(China) (Netherlands)	Shang Fumei / Shi Wen; Eline Coene / Monique Hoogland	15; 5	15; 5

=== Japan vs Netherlands ===
Japan
2
Stadium Negara
27 May 1988, 19:30 UTC+8

Netherlands
3

			1	2	3
1	(Japan) (Netherlands)	Sumiko Kitada; Eline Coene	7; 11	11; 1	11; 8
2	(Japan) (Netherlands)	Yoko Koizumi; Astrid van der Knaap	3; 11	10; 12
3	(Japan) (Netherlands)	Hideyo Noguchi; Monique Hoogland	7; 11	11; 4	2; 11
4	(Japan) (Netherlands)	Sumiko Kitada / Yoko Koizumi; Eline Coene / Erica van Dijck	15; 6	15; 17	15; 9
5	(Japan) (Netherlands)	Kimiko Jinnai / Hisako Takamine; Eline Coene / Monique Hoogland	13; 15	7; 15

=== China vs Denmark ===
China
5
Stadium Negara
28 May 1988, 19:30 UTC+8

Denmark
0

			1	2	3
1	(China) (Denmark)	Li Lingwei; Kirsten Larsen	11; 6	11; 5
2	(China) (Denmark)	Han Aiping; Pernille Nedergaard	11; 1	11; 2
3	(China) (Denmark)	Gu Jiaming; Charlotte Hattens	11; 5	11; 5
4	(China) (Denmark)	Guan Weizhen / Lin Ying; Dorte Kjær / Nettie Nielsen	15; 4	15; 5
5	(China) (Denmark)	Shi Wen / Zheng Yuli; Grete Mogensen / Lotte Olsen	15; 10	15; 5

== Group B ==
Pos	Team	Pld	W	L	GF	GA	GD	PF	PA	PD	Pts	Qualification
1	South Korea	3	3	0	29	6	+23	408	224	+184	3	Advance to semi-finals
2	Indonesia	3	2	1	20	15	+5	345	264	+81	2	Advance to semi-finals
3	England	3	1	2	17	18	−1	307	308	−1	1	
4	Malaysia	3	0	3	3	30	−27	145	409	−264	0	

Source: The Straits Times

=== Indonesia vs Malaysia ===
Indonesia
5
Stadium Negara
23 May 1988, 19:30 UTC+8

Malaysia
0

			1	2	3
1	(Indonesia) (Malaysia)	Sarwendah Kusumawardhani; Lim Siew Choon	11; 3	11; 1
2	(Indonesia) (Malaysia)	Susi Susanti; Lee Wai Leng	11; 3	11; 8
3	(Indonesia) (Malaysia)	Kho Mei Hwa; Tan Mei Chuan	11; 5	11; 12	11; 0
4	(Indonesia) (Malaysia)	Yanti Kusmiati / Erma Sulistianingsih; Lim Siew Choon / Tan Sui Hoon	15; 6	15; 4
5	(Indonesia) (Malaysia)	Dwi Elmyati / Verawaty Fadjrin; Juliet Poon / Tan Lee Wai	15; 1	15; 1

=== South Korea vs England ===
South Korea
5
Stadium Negara
24 May 1988, 19:30 UTC+8

England
0

			1	2	3
1	(South Korea) (England)	Hwang Hye-young; Helen Troke	12; 10	5; 11	11; 3
2	(South Korea) (England)	Lee Young-suk; Fiona Elliott	11; 3	11; 8
3	(South Korea) (England)	Lee Heung-soon; Julie Munday	0; 11	11; 3	12; 10
4	(South Korea) (England)	Chung So-young / Kim Yun-ja; Gillian Clark / Sara Sankey	18; 13	15; 5
5	(South Korea) (England)	Chung Myung-hee / Yoo Sang-hee; Fiona Elliott / Cheryl Johnson	15; 6	15; 4

=== South Korea vs Malaysia ===
South Korea
5
Stadium Negara
25 May 1988, 19:30 UTC+8

Malaysia
0

			1	2	3
1	(South Korea) (Malaysia)	Hwang Hye-young; Lim Siew Choon	11; 2	11; 2
2	(South Korea) (Malaysia)	Lee Young-suk; Lee Wai Leng	11; 1	11; 0
3	(South Korea) (Malaysia)	Lee Heung-soon; Tan Mei Chuan	11; 6	7; 11	11; 1
4	(South Korea) (Malaysia)	Chung So-young / Kim Yun-ja; Lim Siew Choon / Tan Sui Hoon	15; 6	15; 9
5	(South Korea) (Malaysia)	Cho Young-suk / Yoo Sang-hee; Tan Lee Wai / Tan Saik Khim	15; 3	12; 15	15; 6

=== Indonesia vs England ===
Indonesia
3
Stadium Negara
26 May 1988, 19:30 UTC+8

England
2

			1	2	3
1	(Indonesia) (England)	Sarwendah Kusumawardhani; Helen Troke	11; 0	10; 12	0; 11
2	(Indonesia) (England)	Susi Susanti; Fiona Elliott	6; 11	11; 4	11; 4
3	(Indonesia) (England)	Kho Mei Hwa; Julie Munday	11; 9	11; 0
4	(Indonesia) (England)	Verawaty Fadjrin / Yanti Kusmiati; Gillian Clark / Sara Sankey	15; 4	8; 15	9; 15
5	(Indonesia) (England)	Erma Sulistianingsih / Susi Susanti; Fiona Elliott / Cheryl Johnson	15; 2	15; 6

=== England vs Malaysia ===
England
5
Stadium Negara
27 May 1988, 19:30 UTC+8

Malaysia
0

			1	2	3
1	(England) (Malaysia)	Helen Troke; Lim Siew Choon	11; 4	11; 0
2	(England) (Malaysia)	Fiona Elliott; Lee Wai Leng	11; 2	11; 5
3	(England) (Malaysia)	Julie Munday; Tan Mei Chuan	12; 9	11; 2
4	(England) (Malaysia)	Gillian Clark / Sara Sankey; Kok Chan Fong / Lee Wai Leng	15; 2	15; 4
5	(England) (Malaysia)	Cheryl Johnson / Claire Palmer; Lim Siew Choon / Tan Sui Hoon	15; 10	15; 1

=== Indonesia vs South Korea ===
Indonesia
1
Stadium Negara
28 May 1988, 19:30 UTC+8

South Korea
4

			1	2	3
1	(Indonesia) (South Korea)	Elizabeth Latief; Hwang Hye-young	1; 11	10; 12
2	(Indonesia) (South Korea)	Susi Susanti; Lee Young-suk	5; 11	7; 11
3	(Indonesia) (South Korea)	Kho Mei Hwa; Lee Heung-soon	6; 11	11; 4	11; 7
4	(Indonesia) (South Korea)	Erma Sulistianingsih / Susi Susanti; Chung So-young / Kim Yun-ja	4; 15	8; 15
5	(Indonesia) (South Korea)	Dwi Elmyati / Verawaty Fadjrin; Chung Myung-hee / Hwang Hye-young	3; 15	9; 15
