= 1988 Thomas Cup group stage =

Badminton team Tournament in Kuala Lumpur

The 1988 Thomas Cup group stage was held at Stadium Negara in Kuala Lumpur, Malaysia, from 23 to 28 May 1988.

The group stage was first stage of the tournament where only the two highest-placing teams in each of the two groups advanced to the knockout stage.

== Draw ==
The original draw for the tournament was conducted on 18 March 1988. The 8 teams will be drawn into two groups each containing four teams.

=== Group composition ===
Group
Group A	Group B
China; England; India; Malaysia (Host)	Denmark; Indonesia; South Korea; Sweden

== Group A ==
Pos	Team	Pld	W	L	GF	GA	GD	PF	PA	PD	Pts	Qualification
1	China	3	3	0	30	3	+27	481	236	+245	3	Advance to semi-finals
2	Malaysia	3	2	1	20	14	+6	426	372	+54	2	Advance to semi-finals
3	England	3	1	2	11	20	−9	313	389	−76	1	
4	India	3	0	3	5	29	−24	251	474	−223	0	

Source: The Straits Times

=== China vs England ===
China
5
Stadium Negara
23 May 1988, 19:30 UTC+8

England
0

			1	2	3
1	(China) (England)	Yang Yang; Nick Yates	15; 11	15; 9
2	(China) (England)	Xiong Guobao; Steve Baddeley	15; 10	15; 6
3	(China) (England)	Zhao Jianhua; Steve Butler	15; 2	15; 3
4	(China) (England)	Li Yongbo / Tian Bingyi; Mike Brown / Richard Outterside	15; 5	15; 5
5	(China) (England)	Chen Hongyong / Chen Kang; Andy Goode / Dave Wright	15; 0	18; 8

=== Malaysia vs India ===
Malaysia
5
Stadium Negara
24 May 1988, 19:30 UTC+8

India
0

			1	2	3
1	(Malaysia) (India)	Misbun Sidek; Prakash Padukone	15; 13	15; 6
2	(Malaysia) (India)	Foo Kok Keong; Syed Modi	15; 3	15; 7
3	(Malaysia) (India)	Rashid Sidek; U. Vimal Kumar	12; 15	15; 4	15; 5
4	(Malaysia) (India)	Jalani Sidek / Razif Sidek; Partho Ganguli / Vikram Singh	15; 5	15; 4
5	(Malaysia) (India)	Cheah Soon Kit / Ong Beng Teong; Prakash Padukone / Uday Pawar	15; 9	10; 15	15; 6

=== China vs India ===
China
5
Stadium Negara
25 May 1988, 19:30 UTC+8

India
0

			1	2	3
1	(China) (India)	Yang Yang; Prakash Padukone	7; 15	15; 5	15; 1
2	(China) (India)	Xiong Guobao; U. Vimal Kumar	15; 5	15; 4
3	(China) (India)	Zhao Jianhua; Harjeet Singh	15; 10	15; 2
4	(China) (India)	Li Yongbo / Tian Bingyi; Ravi Kunte / Uday Pawar	15; 6	15; 7
5	(China) (India)	Chen Hongyong / Chen Kang; Partho Ganguli / Vikram Singh	15; 8	15; 3

=== Malaysia vs England ===
Malaysia
4
Stadium Negara
26 May 1988, 19:30 UTC+8

England
1

			1	2	3
1	(Malaysia) (England)	Misbun Sidek; Steve Baddeley	11; 15	7; 15
2	(Malaysia) (England)	Foo Kok Keong; Steve Butler	18; 17	15; 13
3	(Malaysia) (England)	Rashid Sidek; Matthew Smith	15; 9	17; 14
4	(Malaysia) (England)	Ong Beng Teong / Razif Sidek; Mike Brown / Richard Outterside	15; 7	15; 10
5	(Malaysia) (England)	Cheah Soon Kit / Jalani Sidek; Andy Goode / Dave Wright	15; 5	15; 4

=== England vs India ===
England
4
Stadium Negara
27 May 1988, 19:30 UTC+8

India
1

			1	2	3
1	(England) (India)	Nick Yates; Prakash Padukone	15; 12	5; 15	5; 15
2	(England) (India)	Steve Baddeley; U. Vimal Kumar	15; 5	15; 1
3	(England) (India)	Steve Butler; Harjeet Singh	15; 3	15; 1
4	(England) (India)	Mike Brown / Richard Outterside; Partho Ganguli / Vikram Singh	15; 9	15; 10
5	(England) (India)	Andy Goode / Dave Wright; Prakash Padukone / Uday Pawar	15; 13	15; 9

=== China vs Malaysia ===
China
5
Stadium Negara
28 May 1988, 19:30 UTC+8

Malaysia
0

			1	2	3
1	(China) (Malaysia)	Yang Yang; Misbun Sidek	15; 10	15; 3
2	(China) (Malaysia)	Xiong Guobao; Foo Kok Keong	15; 9	15; 9
3	(China) (Malaysia)	Zhao Jianhua; Lee Fook Heng	15; 10	15; 4
4	(China) (Malaysia)	Li Yongbo / Tian Bingyi; Jalani Sidek / Razif Sidek	11; 15	15; 5	18; 15
5	(China) (Malaysia)	Chen Hongyong / Chen Kang; Cheah Soon Kit / Soo Beng Kiang	7; 15	15; 4	15; 12

== Group B ==
Pos	Team	Pld	W	L	GF	GA	GD	PF	PA	PD	Pts	Qualification
1	Indonesia	3	3	0	25	7	+18	437	287	+150	3	Advance to semi-finals
2	Denmark	3	2	1	21	12	+9	415	374	+41	2	Advance to semi-finals
3	South Korea	3	1	2	13	21	−8	364	433	−69	1	
4	Sweden	3	0	3	7	26	−19	338	460	−122	0	

Source: The Straits Times

=== Indonesia vs Sweden ===
Indonesia
5
Stadium Negara
23 May 1988, 19:30 UTC+8

Sweden
0

			1	2	3
1	(Indonesia) (Sweden)	Icuk Sugiarto; Jens Olsson	15; 5	15; 0
2	(Indonesia) (Sweden)	Eddy Kurniawan; Jörgen Tuvesson	15; 8	15; 2
3	(Indonesia) (Sweden)	Alan Budikusuma; Jonas Herrgårdh	15; 10	15; 7
4	(Indonesia) (Sweden)	Gunawan / Eddy Hartono; Jan-Eric Antonsson / Pär-Gunnar Jönsson	15; 9	15; 11
5	(Indonesia) (Sweden)	Bobby Ertanto / Liem Swie King; Peter Axelsson / Stefan Karlsson	15; 4	15; 7

=== Denmark vs Sweden ===
Denmark
4
Stadium Negara
24 May 1988, 19:30 UTC+8

Sweden
1

			1	2	3
1	(Denmark) (Sweden)	Morten Frost; Jens Olsson	15; 6	15; 4
2	(Denmark) (Sweden)	Ib Frederiksen; Jörgen Tuvesson	18; 15	18; 14
3	(Denmark) (Sweden)	Torben Carlsen; Jonas Herrgårdh	17; 14	15; 6
4	(Denmark) (Sweden)	Steen Fladberg / Jan Paulsen; Jan-Eric Antonsson / Pär-Gunnar Jönsson	15; 11	5; 15	13; 15
5	(Denmark) (Sweden)	Max Gandrup / Thomas Lund; Peter Axelsson / Stefan Karlsson	15; 12	17; 15

=== Indonesia vs South Korea ===
Indonesia
4
Stadium Negara
25 May 1988, 19:30 UTC+8

South Korea
1

			1	2	3
1	(Indonesia) (South Korea)	Icuk Sugiarto; Sung Han-kook	17; 16	15; 3
2	(Indonesia) (South Korea)	Eddy Kurniawan; Park Sung-bae	15; 3	15; 10
3	(Indonesia) (South Korea)	Ardy Wiranata; Park Joo-bong	15; 3	15; 6
4	(Indonesia) (South Korea)	Gunawan / Eddy Hartono; Park Joo-bong / Sung Han-kook	8; 15	7; 15
5	(Indonesia) (South Korea)	Bobby Ertanto / Liem Swie King; Lee Deuk-choon / Kim Moon-soo	15; 7	9; 15	17; 16

=== Denmark vs South Korea ===
Denmark
4
Stadium Negara
26 May 1988, 19:30 UTC+8

South Korea
1

			1	2	3
1	(Denmark) (South Korea)	Morten Frost; Sung Han-kook	4; 15	15; 11	15; 10
2	(Denmark) (South Korea)	Jens Peter Nierhoff; Park Sung-bae	15; 7	15; 3
3	(Denmark) (South Korea)	Ib Frederiksen; Lee Gwang-jin	15; 7	15; 5
4	(Denmark) (South Korea)	Steen Fladberg / Jan Paulsen; Kim Moon-soo / Park Joo-bong	4; 15	6; 15
5	(Denmark) (South Korea)	Max Gandrup / Thomas Lund; Lee Deuk-choon / Sung Han-kook	15; 3	18; 17

=== Indonesia vs Denmark ===
Indonesia
3
Stadium Negara
27 May 1988, 19:30 UTC+8

Denmark
2

			1	2	3
1	(Indonesia) (Denmark)	Icuk Sugiarto; Morten Frost	15; 8	15; 3
2	(Indonesia) (Denmark)	Eddy Kurniawan; Jens Peter Nierhoff	15; 8	15; 11
3	(Indonesia) (Denmark)	Alan Budikusuma; Ib Frederiksen	15; 9	12; 15	7; 15
4	(Indonesia) (Denmark)	Bobby Ertanto / Liem Swie King; Max Gandrup / Thomas Lund	15; 10	15; 6
5	(Indonesia) (Denmark)	Hadibowo Susanto / Eddy Hartono; Mark Christiansen / Michael Kjeldsen	7; 15	8; 15

=== South Korea vs Sweden ===
South Korea
3
Stadium Negara
28 May 1988, 19:30 UTC+8

Sweden
2

			1	2	3
1	(South Korea) (Sweden)	Lee Gwang-jin; Jens Olsson	15; 10	17; 15
2	(South Korea) (Sweden)	Choi Sang-bum; Jörgen Tuvesson	13; 15	8; 15
3	(South Korea) (Sweden)	Ahn Jae-chang; Jonas Herrgårdh	1; 15	15; 8	8; 15
4	(South Korea) (Sweden)	Park Joo-bong / Shon Jin-hwan; Jan-Eric Antonsson / Pär-Gunnar Jönsson	15; 6	5; 15	15; 6
5	(South Korea) (Sweden)	Choi Sang-bum / Lee Gwang-jin; Peter Axelsson / Stefan Karlsson	18; 13	17; 15
