= 1990 Thomas Cup group stage =

Badminton team tournament in Japan

The 1990 Thomas Cup group stage was held at the Tsuyuhashi Sports Center in Nagoya, Japan, from 25 to 27 May 1990.

The group stage was first stage of the tournament where only the two highest-placing teams in each of the two groups advanced to the knockout stage.

== Draw ==
The original draw for the tournament was conducted on 15 March 1990. The 8 teams will be drawn into two groups each containing four teams.

=== Group composition ===
Group
Group A	Group B
China; South Korea; Malaysia; Sweden	Denmark; England; Indonesia; Japan (Host)

== Group A ==
Pos	Team	Pld	W	L	GF	GA	GD	PF	PA	PD	Pts	Qualification
1	China	3	3	0	30	2	+28	470	271	+199	3	Advance to semi-finals
2	Malaysia	3	2	1	19	15	+4	414	382	+32	2	Advance to semi-finals
3	South Korea	3	1	2	11	22	−11	361	429	−68	1	
4	Sweden	3	0	3	6	27	−21	308	471	−163	0	

Source: The Straits Times

=== China vs Sweden ===
China
5
Tsuyuhashi Sports Center
25 May 1990, 11:00 UTC+9

Sweden
0

			1	2	3
1	(China) (Sweden)	Yang Yang; Jens Olsson	15; 4	15; 10
2	(China) (Sweden)	Xiong Guobao; Peter Axelsson	15; 5	15; 9
3	(China) (Sweden)	Wu Wenkai; Jonas Herrgårdh	10; 15	15; 5	15; 7
4	(China) (Sweden)	Li Yongbo / Tian Bingyi; Jan-Eric Antonsson / Stellan Österberg	15; 8	15; 6
5	(China) (Sweden)	Chen Hongyong / Chen Kang; Patrik Andreasson / Rikard Rönnblom	15; 10	15; 7

=== Malaysia vs South Korea ===
Malaysia
4
Tsuyuhashi Sports Center
25 May 1990, 16:00 UTC+9

South Korea
1

			1	2	3
1	(Malaysia) (South Korea)	Rashid Sidek; Kim Hak-kyun	15; 6	3; 15	15; 3
2	(Malaysia) (South Korea)	Foo Kok Keong; Lee Gwang-jin	17; 16	15; 11
3	(Malaysia) (South Korea)	Kwan Yoke Meng; Choi Sang-bum	15; 13	12; 15	15; 7
4	(Malaysia) (South Korea)	Jalani Sidek / Razif Sidek; Kim Moon-soo / Park Joo-bong	5; 15	9; 15
5	(Malaysia) (South Korea)	Cheah Soon Kit / Soo Beng Kiang; Kim Jong-woong / Shon Jin-hwan	15; 10	15; 2

=== China vs South Korea ===
China
5
Tsuyuhashi Sports Center
26 May 1990, 11:00 UTC+9

South Korea
0

			1	2	3
1	(China) (South Korea)	Yang Yang; Kim Hak-kyun	15; 9	15; 8
2	(China) (South Korea)	Xiong Guobao; Lee Gwang-jin	15; 9	15; 11
3	(China) (South Korea)	Zhao Jianhua; Choi Sang-bum	15; 12	15; 5
4	(China) (South Korea)	Li Yongbo / Tian Bingyi; Kim Jong-woong / Shon Jin-hwan	15; 10	15; 6
5	(China) (South Korea)	Chen Hongyong / Chen Kang; Kim Moon-soo / Lee Gwang-jin	15; 2	15; 13

=== Malaysia vs Sweden ===
Malaysia
5
Tsuyuhashi Sports Center
26 May 1990, 16:00 UTC+9

Sweden
0

			1	2	3
1	(Malaysia) (Sweden)	Rashid Sidek; Jens Olsson	15; 7	15; 11
2	(Malaysia) (Sweden)	Foo Kok Keong; Peter Axelsson	17; 14	15; 4
3	(Malaysia) (Sweden)	Kwan Yoke Meng; Jonas Herrgårdh	15; 10	15; 5
4	(Malaysia) (Sweden)	Jalani Sidek / Razif Sidek; Jan-Eric Antonsson / Stellan Österberg	15; 9	15; 6
5	(Malaysia) (Sweden)	Cheah Soon Kit / Soo Beng Kiang; Peter Axelsson / Jens Olsson	11; 15	15; 2	15; 11

=== South Korea vs Sweden ===
South Korea
3
Tsuyuhashi Sports Center
27 May 1990, 11:00 UTC+9

Sweden
2

			1	2	3
1	(South Korea) (Sweden)	Kim Hak-kyun; Jens Olsson	3; 15	15; 10	16; 18
2	(South Korea) (Sweden)	Lee Gwang-jin; Peter Axelsson	17; 12	15; 9
3	(South Korea) (Sweden)	Choi Sang-bum; Jonas Herrgårdh	15; 9	15; 8
4	(South Korea) (Sweden)	Kim Moon-soo / Park Joo-bong; Jan-Eric Antonsson / Stellan Österberg	15; 7	15; 10
5	(South Korea) (Sweden)	Kim Jong-woong / Lee Gwang-jin; Peter Axelsson / Jens Olsson	10; 15	12; 15

=== China vs Malaysia ===
China
5
Tsuyuhashi Sports Center
27 May 1990, 16:00 UTC+9

Malaysia
0

			1	2	3
1	(China) (Malaysia)	Yang Yang; Foo Kok Keong	15; 8	15; 3
2	(China) (Malaysia)	Xiong Guobao; Kwan Yoke Meng	15; 9	15; 10
3	(China) (Malaysia)	Zhao Jianhua; Ong Ewe Chye	15; 7	7; 15	18; 14
4	(China) (Malaysia)	Li Yongbo / Tian Bingyi; Cheah Soon Kit / Rashid Sidek	15; 9	15; 12
5	(China) (Malaysia)	Chen Hongyong / Chen Kang; Rahman Sidek / Soo Beng Kiang	15; 3	15; 10

== Group B ==
Pos	Team	Pld	W	L	GF	GA	GD	PF	PA	PD	Pts	Qualification
1	Indonesia	3	3	0	28	6	+22	486	278	+208	3	Advance to semi-finals
2	Denmark	3	2	1	19	14	+5	417	373	+44	2	Advance to semi-finals
3	Japan	3	1	2	12	23	−11	358	466	−108	1	
4	England	3	0	3	9	25	−16	324	468	−144	0	

Source: The Straits Times

=== Indonesia vs England ===
Indonesia
5
Tsuyuhashi Sports Center
25 May 1990, 11:00 UTC+9

England
0

			1	2	3
1	(Indonesia) (England)	Alan Budikusuma; Steve Baddeley	15; 6	15; 12
2	(Indonesia) (England)	Eddy Kurniawan; Darren Hall	12; 15	15; 3	4; 1	retired
3	(Indonesia) (England)	Joko Suprianto; Steve Butler	15; 2	15; 3
4	(Indonesia) (England)	Rudy Gunawan / Eddy Hartono; Nick Ponting / Dave Wright	15; 3	15; 7
5	(Indonesia) (England)	Bagus Setiadi / Icuk Sugiarto; Mike Brown / Chris Hunt	15; 5	15; 11

=== Denmark vs Japan ===
Denmark
4
Tsuyuhashi Sports Center
25 May 1990, 16:00 UTC+9

Japan
1

			1	2	3
1	(Denmark) (Japan)	Morten Frost; Shinji Matsuura	15; 9	17; 15
2	(Denmark) (Japan)	Poul-Erik Høyer Larsen; Hiroki Eto	15; 3	15; 8
3	(Denmark) (Japan)	Jens Peter Nierhoff; Shuji Matsuno	15; 7	15; 11
4	(Denmark) (Japan)	Jan Paulsen / Henrik Svarrer; Shuji Matsuno / Shinji Matsuura	9; 15	16; 18
5	(Denmark) (Japan)	Max Gandrup / Thomas Lund; Fumihiko Machida / Koji Miya	15; 8	15; 7

=== Denmark vs England ===
Denmark
4
Tsuyuhashi Sports Center
26 May 1990, 11:00 UTC+9

England
1

			1	2	3
1	(Denmark) (England)	Morten Frost; Steve Baddeley	15; 1	15; 9
2	(Denmark) (England)	Poul-Erik Høyer Larsen; Steve Butler	15; 7	11; 15	15; 8
3	(Denmark) (England)	Jens Peter Nierhoff; Anders Nielsen	13; 15	13; 18
4	(Denmark) (England)	Jan Paulsen / Henrik Svarrer; Nick Ponting / Dave Wright	17; 14	15; 7
5	(Denmark) (England)	Max Gandrup / Thomas Lund; Mike Brown / Chris Hunt	15; 6	15; 9

=== Indonesia vs Japan ===
Indonesia
5
Tsuyuhashi Sports Center
26 May 1990, 16:00 UTC+9

Japan
0

			1	2	3
1	(Indonesia) (Japan)	Eddy Kurniawan; Shinji Matsuura	15; 7	8; 15	15; 3
2	(Indonesia) (Japan)	Joko Suprianto; Hiroki Eto	15; 7	15; 8
3	(Indonesia) (Japan)	Ardy Wiranata; Shuji Matsuno	15; 7	15; 3
4	(Indonesia) (Japan)	Rudy Gunawan / Eddy Hartono; Shuji Matsuno / Shinji Matsuura	14; 18	15; 7	15; 0
5	(Indonesia) (Japan)	Bagus Setiadi / Icuk Sugiarto; Fumihiko Machida / Koji Miya	15; 12	15; 12

=== Indonesia vs Denmark ===
Indonesia
4
Tsuyuhashi Sports Center
27 May 1990, 11:00 UTC+9

Denmark
1

			1	2	3
1	(Indonesia) (Denmark)	Alan Budikusuma; Morten Frost	15; 9	4; 15	15; 2
2	(Indonesia) (Denmark)	Joko Suprianto; Poul-Erik Høyer Larsen	15; 1	15; 1
3	(Indonesia) (Denmark)	Ardy Wiranata; Nils Skeby	15; 13	15; 5
4	(Indonesia) (Denmark)	Rudy Gunawan / Eddy Hartono; Jan Paulsen / Henrik Svarrer	15; 9	15; 12
5	(Indonesia) (Denmark)	Richard Mainaky / Bagus Setiadi; Max Gandrup / Thomas Lund	9; 15	15; 11	15; 18

=== England vs Japan ===
England
2
Tsuyuhashi Sports Center
27 May 1990, 16:00 UTC+9

Japan
3

			1	2	3
1	(England) (Japan)	Steve Baddeley; Shinji Matsuura	11; 15	15; 7	15; 8
2	(England) (Japan)	Steve Butler; Hiroki Eto	11; 15	15; 4	15; 8
3	(England) (Japan)	Anders Nielsen; Shuji Matsuno	3; 15	11; 15
4	(England) (Japan)	Nick Ponting / Dave Wright; Shuji Matsuno / Shinji Matsuura	8; 15	10; 15
5	(England) (Japan)	Steve Baddeley / Mike Brown; Fumihiko Machida / Koji Miya	7; 15	15; 11	11; 15
