= 1990 Thomas Cup knockout stage =

Badminton championships

The knockout stage for the 1990 Thomas Cup in Tokyo, Japan began on 30 May 1990 with the semi-finals and ended on 3 June 1990 with the final.

== Qualified teams ==
The top two placed teams from each of the two groups qualified for this stage.

Group	Winners	Runners-up
A	China	Malaysia
B	Indonesia	Denmark

== Bracket ==
Semi-finals
China	5
Denmark	0
Malaysia	3
Indonesia	2

Final
China	4
Malaysia	1

== Semi-finals ==
=== Semi-final 1 ===
China
5
Tokyo Metropolitan Gymnasium
30 May 1990, 16:00 UTC+9

Denmark
0

			1	2	3
1	(China) (Denmark)	Yang Yang; Morten Frost	7; 15	15; 12	15; 11
2	(China) (Denmark)	Xiong Guobao; Poul-Erik Høyer Larsen	15; 17	15; 1	15; 8
3	(China) (Denmark)	Zhao Jianhua; Jens Peter Nierhoff	15; 8	15; 9
4	(China) (Denmark)	Li Yongbo / Tian Bingyi; Jan Paulsen / Henrik Svarrer	16; 18	15; 7	15; 2
5	(China) (Denmark)	Chen Kang / Chen Hongyong; Max Gandrup / Thomas Lund	15; 5	15; 5

=== Semi-final 2 ===
Malaysia
3
Tokyo Metropolitan Gymnasium
31 May 1990, 16:00 UTC+9

Indonesia
2

			1	2	3
1	(Malaysia) (Indonesia)	Rashid Sidek; Alan Budikusuma	6; 15	7; 15
2	(Malaysia) (Indonesia)	Foo Kok Keong; Joko Suprianto	15; 8	17; 18	15; 9
3	(Malaysia) (Indonesia)	Kwan Yoke Meng; Ardy Wiranata	15; 11	14; 15	8; 15
4	(Malaysia) (Indonesia)	Razif Sidek / Jalani Sidek; Eddy Hartono / Rudy Gunawan	15; 8	15; 4
5	(Malaysia) (Indonesia)	Cheah Soon Kit / Soo Beng Kiang; Icuk Sugiarto / Richard Mainaky	15; 8	15; 11

== Final ==
China
4
Tokyo Metropolitan Gymnasium
3 June 1990, 16:00 UTC+9

Malaysia
1

			1	2	3
1	(China) (Malaysia)	Yang Yang; Rashid Sidek	15; 10	15; 10
2	(China) (Malaysia)	Xiong Guobao; Foo Kok Keong	15; 6	15; 4
3	(China) (Malaysia)	Zhao Jianhua; Kwan Yoke Meng	15; 10	15; 6
4	(China) (Malaysia)	Tian Bingyi / Li Yongbo; Razif Sidek / Jalani Sidek	8; 15	6; 15
5	(China) (Malaysia)	Chen Kang / Chen Hongyong; Cheah Soon Kit / Soo Beng Kiang	15; 7	15; 12
