= 1990 Thomas & Uber Cup squads =

This article lists the squads for the 1990 Thomas & Uber Cup participating teams. The age listed for each player is on 25 May 1990 which was the first day of the tournament.

== Thomas Cup ==
=== Group A ===
==== China ====
Nine players represented China in the 1990 Thomas Cup.

Name	DoB/Age
Yang Yang	8 December 1963 (aged 26)
Xiong Guobao	1 November 1962 (aged 27)
Zhao Jianhua	21 April 1965 (aged 25)
Wu Wenkai	28 November 1970 (aged 19)
Li Yongbo	18 September 1962 (aged 27)
Tian Bingyi	30 July 1963 (aged 26)
Chen Kang	24 November 1965 (aged 24)
Chen Hongyong	1 May 1966 (aged 24)
Zheng Yumin	14 August 1967 (aged 22)

==== Malaysia ====
Nine players represented Malaysia in the 1990 Thomas Cup.

Name	DoB/Age
Rashid Sidek	8 July 1968 (aged 21)
Foo Kok Keong	8 January 1963 (aged 27)
Kwan Yoke Meng	11 January 1966 (aged 24)
Jalani Sidek	10 November 1963 (aged 26)
Razif Sidek	29 May 1962 (aged 27)
Rahman Sidek	20 September 1965 (aged 24)
Cheah Soon Kit	9 January 1968 (aged 22)
Soo Beng Kiang	19 March 1968 (aged 22)
Ong Ewe Chye	1 June 1965 (aged 24)

==== South Korea ====
Nine players represented South Korea in the 1990 Thomas Cup.

Name	DoB/Age
Sung Han-kook	19 November 1963 (aged 26)
Kim Hak-kyun	15 November 1971 (aged 18)
Lee Gwang-jin	5 December 1970 (aged 19)
Choi Sang-bum	10 July 1970 (aged 19)
Kim Moon-soo	29 December 1963 (aged 26)
Park Joo-bong	5 December 1964 (aged 25)
Shon Jin-hwan	30 September 1968 (aged 21)
Kwon Seung-taik	9 September 1956 (aged 33)
Kim Jong-woong	1965 (aged 24–25)

==== Sweden ====
Eight players represented Sweden in the 1990 Thomas Cup. Pär-Gunnar Jönsson withdrew from the squad due to injury.

Name	DoB/Age
Jens Olsson	15 December 1964 (aged 25)
Peter Axelsson	22 June 1967 (aged 22)
Jonas Herrgårdh	1 September 1963 (aged 26)
Jörgen Tuvesson	25 September 1967 (aged 22)
Patrik Andreasson	20 August 1966 (aged 23)
Rikard Rönnblom	1967 (aged 22–23)
Jan-Eric Antonsson	9 September 1961 (aged 28)
~~Pär-Gunnar Jönsson~~	6 August 1963 (aged 26)
Stellan Österberg	17 January 1965 (aged 25)

=== Group B ===
==== Denmark ====
Nine players represented Denmark in the 1990 Thomas Cup.

Name	DoB/Age
Morten Frost	4 April 1958 (aged 32)
Poul-Erik Høyer Larsen	20 September 1965 (aged 24)
Nils Skeby	1964 (aged 25–26)
Jens Peter Nierhoff	2 September 1960 (aged 29)
Jon Holst-Christensen	16 June 1968 (aged 21)
Max Gandrup	23 August 1967 (aged 22)
Thomas Lund	2 August 1968 (aged 21)
Jan Paulsen	12 February 1967 (aged 23)
Henrik Svarrer	22 June 1964 (aged 25)

==== England ====
Eight players represented England in the 1990 Thomas Cup. Andrew Fairhurst withdrew from the squad due to injury and was replaced by Mike Brown.

Name	DoB/Age
Steve Baddeley	28 March 1961 (aged 29)
Darren Hall	25 October 1965 (aged 24)
Steve Butler	27 September 1963 (aged 26)
Anders Nielsen	24 February 1967 (aged 23)
Mike Brown	13 March 1957 (aged 33)
Nick Ponting	13 June 1966 (aged 23)
Dave Wright	10 April 1965 (aged 25)
Chris Hunt	1 December 1968 (aged 21)
~~Andrew Fairhurst~~	13 March 1969 (aged 21)

==== Indonesia ====
Nine players represented Indonesia in the 1990 Thomas Cup.

Name	DoB/Age
Alan Budikusuma	29 March 1968 (aged 22)
Eddy Kurniawan	2 July 1962 (aged 27)
Joko Suprianto	21 January 1966 (aged 24)
Icuk Sugiarto	4 October 1962 (aged 27)
Ardy Wiranata	10 February 1970 (aged 20)
Bagus Setiadi	24 June 1966 (aged 23)
Richard Mainaky	23 January 1965 (aged 25)
Gunawan	31 December 1966 (aged 23)
Eddy Hartono	19 July 1964 (aged 25)

==== Japan ====
Nine players represented Japan in the 1990 Thomas Cup.

Name	DoB/Age
Shinji Matsuura	15 February 1964 (aged 26)
Shuji Matsuno	11 September 1963 (aged 26)
Hiroki Etō	16 December 1966 (aged 23)
Fumihiko Machida	17 March 1969 (aged 21)
Hiroshi Nishiyama	19 February 1960 (aged 30)
Masami Osanai	1965 (aged 24–25)
Koji Miya	25 May 1965 (aged 25)
Tatsuya Yanagiya	22 May 1964 (aged 26)
Hideaki Motoyama	25 July 1969 (aged 20)

== Uber Cup ==
=== Group A ===
==== Denmark ====
Six players represented Denmark in the 1990 Uber Cup. Kirsten Larsen, Pernille Nedergaard and Gitte Paulsen withdrew from the squad.

Name	DoB/Age
~~Kirsten Larsen~~	14 March 1962 (aged 28)
~~Pernille Nedergaard~~	5 December 1967 (aged 22)
Charlotte Hattens	29 August 1964 (aged 25)
Helle Andersen	1968 (aged 21–22)
Dorte Kjær	6 February 1964 (aged 26)
Nettie Nielsen	23 July 1964 (aged 25)
Grete Mogensen	15 May 1963 (aged 27)
~~Gitte Paulsen~~	4 December 1965 (aged 24)
Lotte Olsen	23 November 1966 (aged 23)

==== England ====
Nine players represented England in the 1990 Uber Cup.

Name	DoB/Age
Fiona Smith	13 November 1963 (aged 26)
Helen Troke	7 November 1964 (aged 25)
Joanne Muggeridge	3 April 1969 (aged 21)
Suzanne Louis	7 October 1965 (aged 24)
Cheryl Johnson	1967 (aged 22–23)
Julie Munday	1967 (aged 22–23)
Nora Perry	15 June 1954 (aged 35)
Gillian Clark	2 September 1961 (aged 28)
Gillian Gowers	9 April 1964 (aged 26)

==== Indonesia ====
Nine players represented Indonesia in the 1990 Uber Cup.

Name	DoB/Age
Sarwendah Kusumawardhani	22 August 1967 (aged 22)
Susi Susanti	11 February 1971 (aged 19)
Minarti Timur	24 March 1968 (aged 22)
Lilik Sudarwati	4 October 1970 (aged 19)
Yanti Kusmiati	22 December 1962 (aged 27)
Erma Sulistianingsih	5 November 1965 (aged 24)
Verawaty Fadjrin	1 October 1957 (aged 32)
Rosiana Tendean	25 August 1964 (aged 25)
Lili Tampi	19 May 1970 (aged 20)

==== Japan ====
Ten players represented Japan in the 1990 Uber Cup.

Name	DoB/Age
Sumiko Kitada	31 March 1962 (aged 28)
Yoko Koizumi	1962 (aged 27–28)
Kumiko Kitamoto	13 June 1965 (aged 24)
Aiko Miyamura	11 August 1971 (aged 18)
Harumi Kohara	24 June 1965 (aged 24)
Hisako Mizui	29 March 1972 (aged 18)
Kimiko Jinnai	12 March 1964 (aged 26)
Takako Shinki	22 March 1967 (aged 23)
Tomomi Matsuo	15 August 1968 (aged 21)
Kyoko Sasage	13 August 1969 (aged 20)

=== Group B ===
==== China ====
Seven players represented China in the 1990 Uber Cup.

Name	DoB/Age
Tang Jiuhong	14 February 1969 (aged 21)
Huang Hua	16 November 1969 (aged 20)
Zhou Lei	25 January 1970 (aged 20)
Lai Caiqin	5 December 1966 (aged 23)
Yao Fen	2 January 1967 (aged 23)
Guan Weizhen	15 June 1964 (aged 25)
Shi Fangjing	1965 (aged 24–25)

==== Netherlands ====
Four players represented the Netherlands in the 1990 Uber Cup. Monique Hoogland and Astrid van der Knaap withdrew from the squad due to injury. Nicole van Hooren was later called up to the squad as a replacement.

Name	DoB/Age
Eline Coene	11 April 1964 (aged 26)
~~Astrid van der Knaap~~	8 October 1964 (aged 25)
~~Monique Hoogland~~	25 August 1967 (aged 22)
Erica van Dijck	12 June 1966 (aged 23)
Maaike de Boer	1963 (aged 26–27)
Sonja Mellink	17 April 1969 (aged 21)
Nicole van Hooren	11 June 1973 (aged 16)

==== South Korea ====
Nine players represented South Korea in the 1990 Uber Cup.

Name	DoB/Age
Hwang Hye-young	16 July 1966 (aged 23)
Lee Young-suk	9 May 1970 (aged 20)
Lee Heung-soon	19 November 1971 (aged 18)
Chung Myung-hee	27 January 1964 (aged 26)
Chung So-young	20 February 1967 (aged 23)
Kim Yun-ja	15 May 1963 (aged 27)
Chung Myung-hee	27 January 1964 (aged 24)
Gil Young-ah	10 June 1970 (aged 19)
Shim Eun-jung	8 June 1971 (aged 18)

==== Sweden ====
Six players represented Sweden in the 1990 Uber Cup. Christine Magnusson withdrew from the squad due to sciatica while Charlotta Wihlborg withdrew due to illness.

Name	DoB/Age
~~Christine Magnusson~~	21 November 1964 (aged 25)
Catrine Bengtsson	21 September 1969 (aged 20)
~~Charlotta Wihlborg~~	1965 (aged 24–25)
Margit Borg	15 June 1969 (aged 20)
Astrid Crabo	10 July 1971 (aged 18)
Maria Bengtsson	5 March 1964 (aged 26)
Karin Ericsson	1961 (aged 28–29)
Emma Edbom	26 September 1968 (aged 21)
