= 1988 Thomas & Uber Cup squads =

This article lists the squads for the 1988 Thomas & Uber Cup participating teams. The age listed for each player is on 23 May 1988 which was the first day of the tournament.

== Thomas Cup ==
=== Group A ===
==== China ====
Nine players represented China in the 1988 Thomas Cup.

Name	DoB/Age
Yang Yang	8 December 1963 (aged 24)
Xiong Guobao	1 November 1962 (aged 25)
Zhao Jianhua	21 April 1965 (aged 23)
Zhang Qingwu	5 January 1964 (aged 24)
Li Yongbo	18 September 1962 (aged 25)
Tian Bingyi	30 July 1963 (aged 24)
Zhou Jincan	1961 (aged 26–27)
Chen Kang	24 November 1965 (aged 22)
Chen Hongyong	1 May 1966 (aged 22)

==== England ====
Nine players represented England in the 1988 Thomas Cup.

Name	DoB/Age
Nick Yates	1962 (aged 25–26)
Steve Baddeley	28 March 1961 (aged 27)
Steve Butler	27 September 1963 (aged 24)
Mike Brown	13 March 1957 (aged 31)
Richard Outterside	1962 (aged 25–26)
Andy Goode	30 January 1960 (aged 28)
Matthew Smith	4 April 1967 (aged 21)
Dave Wright	10 April 1965 (aged 23)
Darren Hall	25 October 1965 (aged 22)

==== India ====
Eight players represented India in the 1988 Thomas Cup.

Name	DoB/Age
Syed Modi	31 December 1962 (aged 25)
U. Vimal Kumar	19 November 1962 (aged 25)
Prakash Padukone	10 June 1955 (aged 32)
Uday Pawar	25 March 1956 (aged 32)
Ravi Kunte	1960 (aged 27–28)
Partho Ganguli	March 1953 (aged 35)
Vikram Singh	1955 (aged 32–33)
Harjeet Singh	1970 (aged 17–18)

==== Malaysia ====
Nine players represented Malaysia in the 1988 Thomas Cup.

Name	DoB/Age
Misbun Sidek	17 February 1960 (aged 28)
Ong Beng Teong	29 May 1962 (aged 25)
Razif Sidek	29 May 1962 (aged 25)
Foo Kok Keong	8 January 1963 (aged 25)
Cheah Soon Kit	9 January 1968 (aged 20)
Jalani Sidek	10 November 1963 (aged 24)
Soo Beng Kiang	19 March 1968 (aged 20)
Rashid Sidek	8 July 1968 (aged 19)
Lee Fook Heng	1970 (aged 17–18)

=== Group B ===
==== Denmark ====
Nine players represented Denmark in the 1988 Thomas Cup.

Name	DoB/Age
Morten Frost	4 April 1958 (aged 30)
Jens Peter Nierhoff	2 September 1960 (aged 27)
Ib Frederiksen	7 May 1964 (aged 24)
Torben Carlsen	17 April 1962 (aged 26)
Poul-Erik Høyer Larsen	20 September 1965 (aged 22)
Steen Fladberg	11 October 1956 (aged 31)
Jan Paulsen	12 February 1967 (aged 21)
Max Gandrup	23 August 1967 (aged 20)
Thomas Lund	2 August 1968 (aged 19)
Henrik Svarrer	22 June 1964 (aged 23)

==== Indonesia ====
Nine players represented Indonesia in the 1988 Thomas Cup.

Name	DoB/Age
Icuk Sugiarto	4 October 1962 (aged 25)
Eddy Kurniawan	2 July 1962 (aged 25)
Alan Budikusuma	29 March 1968 (aged 20)
Ardy Wiranata	10 February 1970 (aged 18)
Liem Swie King	28 February 1956 (aged 32)
Eddy Hartono	19 July 1964 (aged 23)
Bobby Ertanto	2 August 1960 (aged 27)
Gunawan	31 December 1966 (aged 21)
Hadibowo Susanto	4 July 1958 (aged 29)

==== South Korea ====
Nine players represented South Korea in the 1988 Thomas Cup.

Name	DoB/Age
Park Joo-bong	5 December 1964 (aged 23)
Kim Moon-soo	29 December 1963 (aged 24)
Sung Han-kook	19 November 1963 (aged 24)
Ahn Jae-chang	1 October 1972 (aged 15)
Lee Deuk-choon	16 July 1962 (aged 25)
Park Sung-bae	11 January 1969 (aged 19)
Lee Gwang-jin	5 December 1970 (aged 17)
Choi Sang-bum	10 July 1971 (aged 16)
Shon Jin-hwan	30 September 1968 (aged 19)

==== Sweden ====
Nine players represented Sweden in the 1988 Thomas Cup.

Name	DoB/Age
Jens Olsson	15 December 1964 (aged 23)
Jörgen Tuvesson	25 September 1967 (aged 20)
Jonas Herrgårdh	1 September 1963 (aged 24)
Patrik Andreasson	20 August 1966 (aged 21)
Stellan Österberg	17 January 1965 (aged 23)
Jan-Eric Antonsson	9 September 1961 (aged 26)
Pär-Gunnar Jönsson	6 August 1963 (aged 24)
Stefan Karlsson	5 November 1955 (aged 32)
Peter Axelsson	22 June 1967 (aged 20)

== Uber Cup ==
=== Group A ===
==== China ====
Nine players represented China in the 1988 Uber Cup.

Name	DoB/Age
Li Lingwei	4 January 1964 (aged 24)
Han Aiping	22 April 1962 (aged 26)
Zheng Yuli	1963 (aged 24–25)
Lin Ying	10 October 1963 (aged 24)
Shi Wen	1963 (aged 24–25)
Gu Jiaming	1964 (aged 23–24)
Guan Weizhen	15 June 1964 (aged 23)
Lao Yujing	1966 (aged 21–22)
Shang Fumei	1964 (aged 23–24)

==== Denmark ====
Ten players represented Denmark in the 1988 Uber Cup.

Name	DoB/Age
Kirsten Larsen	14 March 1962 (aged 26)
Christina Bostofte	1971 (aged 16–17)
Dorte Kjær	6 February 1964 (aged 24)
Grete Mogensen	15 May 1963 (aged 25)
Charlotte Hattens	29 August 1964 (aged 23)
Lisbet Stuer-Lauridsen	22 September 1968 (aged 19)
Gitte Paulsen	4 December 1965 (aged 22)
Nettie Nielsen	23 July 1964 (aged 23)
Pernille Nedergaard	5 December 1967 (aged 20)
Lotte Olsen	23 November 1966 (aged 21)

==== Japan ====
Six players represented Japan in the 1988 Uber Cup.

Name	DoB/Age
Sumiko Kitada	31 March 1962 (aged 26)
Kimiko Jinnai	12 March 1964 (aged 24)
Yoko Koizumi	1962 (aged 25–26)
Kumiko Kitamoto	13 June 1965 (aged 22)
Hisako Takamine	30 April 1964 (aged 24)
Hideyo Noguchi	8 April 1961 (aged 27)

==== Netherlands ====
Six players represented the Netherlands in the 1988 Uber Cup.

Name	DoB/Age
Eline Coene	11 April 1964 (aged 24)
Astrid van der Knaap	8 October 1964 (aged 23)
Monique Hoogland	25 August 1967 (aged 20)
Erica van Dijck	12 June 1966 (aged 21)
Maaike de Boer	1963 (aged 24–25)
Paula Rip	1961 (aged 26–27)

=== Group B ===
==== England ====
Nine players represented England in the 1988 Uber Cup.

Name	DoB/Age
Helen Troke	7 November 1964 (aged 23)
Fiona Elliott	13 November 1963 (aged 24)
Gillian Clark	2 September 1961 (aged 26)
Gillian Gowers	9 April 1964 (aged 24)
Claire Palmer	1966 (aged 21–22)
Sara Sankey	29 September 1967 (aged 20)
Julie Munday	1967 (aged 20–21)
Sally Podger	8 February 1962 (aged 26)
Cheryl Johnson	1967 (aged 20–21)

==== Indonesia ====
Nine players represented Indonesia in the 1988 Uber Cup.

Name	DoB/Age
Elizabeth Latief	27 March 1963 (aged 25)
Sarwendah Kusumawardhani	22 August 1967 (aged 20)
Susi Susanti	11 February 1971 (aged 17)
Kho Mei Hwa	1966 (aged 21–22)
Verawaty Fadjrin	1 October 1957 (aged 30)
Yanti Kusmiati	22 December 1962 (aged 25)
Erma Sulistianingsih	5 November 1965 (aged 22)
Dwi Elmyati	1964 (aged 23–24)
Lilik Sudarwati	4 October 1970 (aged 17)

==== Malaysia ====
Nine players represented Malaysia in the 1988 Uber Cup.

Name	DoB/Age
Kok Chan Fong	1968 (aged 19–20)
Tan Mei Chuan	1 November 1963 (aged 24)
Juliet Poon	1958 (aged 29–30)
Lee Wai Leng	11 November 1969 (aged 18)
Lim Siew Choon	1 January 1965 (aged 23)
Tan Saik Khim	1973 (aged 14–15)
Tan Lee Wai	20 July 1970 (aged 17)
Tan Sui Hoon	5 December 1963 (aged 24)
Lee Ying Lin	1970 (aged 17–18)

==== South Korea ====
Nine players represented South Korea in the 1988 Uber Cup.

Name	DoB/Age
Kim Yun-ja	15 May 1963 (aged 25)
Yoo Sang-hee	1964 (aged 23–24)
Hwang Hye-young	16 July 1966 (aged 21)
Chung So-young	20 February 1967 (aged 21)
Lee Young-suk	9 May 1970 (aged 18)
Lee Heung-soon	19 November 1971 (aged 16)
Chung Myung-hee	27 January 1964 (aged 24)
Cho Young-suk	10 June 1970 (aged 17)
Chun Sung-suk	1966 (aged 21–22)
