= 1990 Uber Cup knockout stage =

Badminton championships

The knockout stage for the 1990 Uber Cup in Tokyo, Japan began on 30 May 1990 with the semi-finals and ended on 2 June 1990 with the final.

== Qualified teams ==
The top two placed teams from each of the two groups qualified for this stage.

Group	Winners	Runners-up
A	Indonesia	Japan
B	South Korea	China

== Bracket ==
Semi-finals
Indonesia	0
China	5
Japan	1
South Korea	4

Final
China	3
South Korea	2

== Semi-finals ==
=== Semi-final 1 ===
China
5
Tokyo Metropolitan Gymnasium
30 May 1990, 11:00 UTC+9

Indonesia
0

			1	2	3
1	(China) (Indonesia)	Tang Jiuhong; Susi Susanti	11; 7	6; 11	11; 6
2	(China) (Indonesia)	Huang Hua; Minarti Timur	12; 10	11; 2
3	(China) (Indonesia)	Zhou Lei; Sarwendah Kusumawardhani	12; 10	12; 10
4	(China) (Indonesia)	Lai Caiqin / Yao Fen; Erma Sulistianingsih / Rosiana Tendean	15; 8	9; 15	15; 7
5	(China) (Indonesia)	Guan Weizhen / Shi Fangjing; Verawaty Fadjrin / Yanti Kusmiati	9; 15	15; 12	15; 9

=== Semi-final 2 ===
South Korea
4
Tokyo Metropolitan Gymnasium
31 May 1990, 11:00 UTC+9

Japan
1

			1	2	3
1	(South Korea) (Japan)	Lee Young-suk; Aiko Miyamura	8; 11	5; 11
2	(South Korea) (Japan)	Lee Heung-soon; Harumi Kohara	12; 9	11; 0
3	(South Korea) (Japan)	Lee Jung-mi; Hisako Mizui	12; 9	11; 9
4	(South Korea) (Japan)	Chung Myung-hee / Chung So-young; Kimiko Jinnai / Takako Shinki	15; 1	15; 10
5	(South Korea) (Japan)	Gil Young-ah / Hwang Hye-young; Tomomi Matsuo / Kyoko Sasage	15; 10	15; 9

== Final ==
China
3
Tokyo Metropolitan Gymnasium
2 June 1990, 11:00 UTC+9

South Korea
2

			1	2	3
1	(China) (South Korea)	Tang Jiuhong; Hwang Hye-young	11; 4	11; 0
2	(China) (South Korea)	Huang Hua; Lee Young-suk	11; 5	11; 7
3	(China) (South Korea)	Zhou Lei; Lee Heung-soon	11; 5	11; 6
4	(China) (South Korea)	Yao Fen / Lai Caiqin; Chung Myung-hee / Chung So-young	17; 16	5; 15	9; 15
5	(China) (South Korea)	Guan Weizhen / Shi Fangjing; Hwang Hye-young / Gil Young-ah	16; 17	13; 15
