= 1992 Thomas & Uber Cup squads =

This article lists the squads for the 1992 Thomas & Uber Cup participating teams. The age listed for each player is on 5 May 1992 which was the first day of the tournament.

== Thomas Cup ==
=== Group A ===
==== China ====
Nine players represented China in the 1992 Thomas Cup.

Name	DoB/Age
Zhao Jianhua	21 April 1965 (aged 27)
Wu Wenkai	28 November 1970 (aged 21)
Liu Jun	9 November 1968 (aged 23)
Li Yongbo	18 September 1962 (aged 29)
Tian Bingyi	30 July 1963 (aged 28)
Huang Zhanzhong	5 November 1968 (aged 23)
Zheng Yumin	14 August 1967 (aged 24)
Chen Hongyong	1 May 1966 (aged 26)
Wan Zhengwen	4 December 1970 (aged 21)

==== Indonesia ====
Nine players represented Indonesia in the 1992 Thomas Cup.

Name	DoB/Age
Ardy Wiranata	10 February 1970 (aged 22)
Alan Budikusuma	29 March 1968 (aged 24)
Hermawan Susanto	24 September 1967 (aged 24)
Joko Suprianto	21 January 1966 (aged 26)
Rudy Gunawan	31 December 1966 (aged 25)
Eddy Hartono	19 July 1964 (aged 27)
Rexy Mainaky	9 March 1968 (aged 24)
Ricky Subagja	27 January 1971 (aged 21)
Bagus Setiadi	24 June 1966 (aged 25)

==== Sweden ====
Seven players represented Sweden in the 1992 Thomas Cup.

Name	DoB/Age
Jens Olsson	15 December 1964 (aged 27)
Patrik Andreasson	20 August 1966 (aged 25)
Rickard Magnusson	10 January 1971 (aged 21)
Pär-Gunnar Jönsson	6 August 1963 (aged 28)
Peter Axelsson	22 June 1967 (aged 24)
Stellan Österberg	17 January 1965 (aged 27)
Mikael Rosén	29 March 1967 (aged 25)
~~Jan-Eric Antonsson~~	9 September 1961 (aged 30)

==== Thailand ====
Nine players represented Thailand in the 1992 Thomas Cup.

Name	DoB/Age
Sompol Kukasemkij	24 January 1963 (aged 29)
Teeranun Chiangta	11 November 1972 (aged 19)
Surachai Makkasasithorn	7 April 1963 (aged 29)
Pulsak Thewarangsee	1972 (aged 19–20)
Siripong Siripool	9 September 1965 (aged 26)
Pramote Teerawiwatana	14 June 1967 (aged 24)
Sakrapee Thongsari	23 June 1962 (aged 29)
Narin Rungbanapan	7 September 1971 (aged 20)
Narong Rungbanapan	7 September 1971 (aged 20)

=== Group B ===
==== Denmark ====
Nine players represented Denmark in the 1992 Thomas Cup.

Name	DoB/Age
Poul-Erik Høyer Larsen	20 September 1965 (aged 26)
Thomas Stuer-Lauridsen	29 April 1971 (aged 21)
Michael Søgaard	4 February 1969 (aged 23)
Peter Espersen	26 December 1968 (aged 23)
Jon Holst-Christensen	16 June 1968 (aged 23)
Max Gandrup	23 August 1967 (aged 24)
Thomas Lund	2 August 1968 (aged 23)
Jan Paulsen	12 February 1967 (aged 25)
Henrik Svarrer	22 June 1964 (aged 27)

==== England ====
Eight players represented England in the 1992 Thomas Cup.

Name	DoB/Age
Darren Hall	25 October 1965 (aged 26)
Anders Nielsen	24 February 1967 (aged 25)
Peter Knowles	28 December 1969 (aged 22)
Peter Smith	22 December 1963 (aged 28)
Nick Ponting	13 June 1966 (aged 25)
Dave Wright	10 April 1965 (aged 27)
Chris Hunt	1 December 1968 (aged 23)
Simon Archer	27 June 1973 (aged 18)

==== Malaysia ====
Eight players represented Malaysia in the 1992 Thomas Cup.

Name	DoB/Age
Rashid Sidek	8 July 1968 (aged 23)
Foo Kok Keong	8 January 1963 (aged 29)
Kwan Yoke Meng	11 January 1966 (aged 26)
Jalani Sidek	10 November 1963 (aged 28)
Razif Sidek	29 May 1962 (aged 29)
Rahman Sidek	20 September 1965 (aged 26)
Cheah Soon Kit	9 January 1968 (aged 24)
Soo Beng Kiang	19 March 1968 (aged 24)

==== South Korea ====
Nine players represented South Korea in the 1992 Thomas Cup.

Name	DoB/Age
Lee Gwang-jin	5 December 1970 (aged 21)
Kim Hak-kyun	15 November 1971 (aged 20)
Park Sung-woo	22 August 1971 (aged 20)
Ahn Jae-chang	1 October 1972 (aged 19)
Kim Moon-soo	29 December 1963 (aged 28)
Park Joo-bong	5 December 1964 (aged 27)
Shon Jin-hwan	30 September 1968 (aged 23)
Lee Sang-bok	17 March 1968 (aged 24)
Kim Yong-ho	1974 (aged 17–18)

== Uber Cup ==
=== Group A ===
==== China ====
Eight players represented China in the 1992 Uber Cup.

Name	DoB/Age
Tang Jiuhong	14 February 1969 (aged 23)
Huang Hua	16 November 1969 (aged 22)
Ye Zhaoying	7 May 1974 (aged 17)
Lin Yanfen	4 January 1971 (aged 21)
Yao Fen	2 January 1967 (aged 25)
Guan Weizhen	15 June 1964 (aged 27)
Nong Qunhua	20 July 1966 (aged 25)
Wu Yuhong	3 November 1966 (aged 25)

==== Indonesia ====
Eight players represented Indonesia in the 1992 Uber Cup.

Name	DoB/Age
Susi Susanti	11 February 1971 (aged 21)
Sarwendah Kusumawardhani	22 August 1967 (aged 24)
Yuliani Santosa	29 October 1971 (aged 20)
Yuni Kartika	16 June 1973 (aged 18)
Erma Sulistianingsih	5 November 1965 (aged 26)
Rosiana Tendean	25 August 1964 (aged 27)
Finarsih	8 February 1972 (aged 20)
Lili Tampi	19 May 1970 (aged 21)

==== Malaysia ====
Nine players represented Malaysia in the 1992 Uber Cup.

Name	DoB/Age
Lee Wai Leng	11 November 1969 (aged 22)
Tan Lee Wai	20 July 1970 (aged 21)
Wong Mee Hung	17 December 1974 (aged 17)
Ai Leen	1974 (aged 17–18)
Zamaliah Sidek	1974 (aged 17–18)
Tan Siew Cheng	1970 (aged 21–22)
Kuak Seok Choon	1969 (aged 22–23)
Chong Mee Leng	1974 (aged 17–18)
Chong Ying Ching	1970 (aged 21–22)

==== Netherlands ====
Six players represented the Netherlands in the 1992 Uber Cup.

Name	DoB/Age
~~Eline Coene~~	11 April 1964 (aged 28)
~~Astrid van der Knaap~~	8 October 1964 (aged 27)
Monique Hoogland	25 August 1967 (aged 24)
~~Erica van den Heuvel~~	12 June 1966 (aged 25)
Elvira van Elven	1970 (aged 21–22)
Sonja Mellink	17 April 1969 (aged 23)
Nicole van Hooren	11 June 1973 (aged 18)
Monique Meijer	1969 (aged 22–23)
Carolien Glebbeek	12 April 1973 (aged 19)

=== Group B ===
==== England ====
Eight players represented England in the 1992 Uber Cup.

Name	DoB/Age
Helen Troke	7 November 1964 (aged 27)
Joanne Muggeridge	3 April 1969 (aged 23)
Fiona Smith	13 November 1963 (aged 28)
Suzanne Louis	7 October 1965 (aged 26)
Gillian Clark	2 September 1961 (aged 30)
Gillian Gowers	9 April 1964 (aged 28)
Alison Humby	7 December 1972 (aged 19)
Joanne Wright	17 November 1972 (aged 19)

==== Japan ====
Eight players represented Japan in the 1992 Uber Cup.

Name	DoB/Age
Hisako Mizui	29 March 1972 (aged 20)
Harumi Kohara	24 June 1965 (aged 26)
Aiko Miyamura	11 August 1971 (aged 20)
Kimiko Jinnai	12 March 1964 (aged 28)
Hisako Mori	4 May 1964 (aged 28)
Tomomi Matsuo	15 August 1968 (aged 23)
Kyoko Sasage	13 August 1969 (aged 22)
Haruko Yachi	4 March 1967 (aged 25)

==== South Korea ====
Eight players represented South Korea in the 1992 Uber Cup.

Name	DoB/Age
Bang Soo-hyun	13 September 1972 (aged 19)
Lee Heung-soon	19 November 1971 (aged 20)
Shim Eun-jung	8 June 1971 (aged 20)
Park Soo-yun	27 November 1974 (aged 17)
Chung So-young	20 February 1967 (aged 25)
Hwang Hye-young	16 July 1966 (aged 25)
Chung Myung-hee	27 January 1964 (aged 24)
Gil Young-ah	10 June 1970 (aged 21)

==== Sweden ====
Six players represented Sweden in the 1992 Uber Cup.

Name	DoB/Age
Lim Xiaoqing	15 August 1967 (aged 24)
Christine Magnusson	21 November 1964 (aged 27)
Catrine Bengtsson	21 September 1969 (aged 22)
Maria Bengtsson	5 March 1964 (aged 28)
Margit Borg	15 June 1969 (aged 22)
Astrid Crabo	10 July 1971 (aged 20)
Reserve
Karolina Ericsson	5 June 1973 (aged 18)
