= 1984 Thomas & Uber Cup squads =

This article lists the squads for the 1984 Thomas & Uber Cup participating teams. The age listed for each player is on 10 May 1984 which was the first day of the tournament.

== Thomas Cup ==
=== Group A ===
==== England ====
Eight players represented England in the 1984 Thomas Cup.

Name	DoB/Age
Nick Yates	1962 (aged 21–22)
Steve Baddeley	28 March 1961 (aged 23)
Mike Tredgett	5 April 1949 (aged 35)
Steve Butler	27 June 1963 (aged 20)
Martin Dew	16 October 1958 (aged 25)
Andy Goode	30 January 1960 (aged 24)
Dipak Tailor	6 June 1964 (aged 19)
Chris Dobson	25 December 1963 (aged 20)

==== Indonesia ====
Eight players represented Indonesia in the 1984 Thomas Cup.

Name	DoB/Age
Liem Swie King	28 February 1956 (aged 28)
Hastomo Arbi	5 August 1958 (aged 25)
Icuk Sugiarto	4 October 1962 (aged 21)
Hadiyanto	31 March 1955 (aged 29)
Hariamanto Kartono	8 August 1954 (aged 29)
Rudy Heryanto	19 October 1954 (aged 29)
Christian Hadinata	11 December 1949 (aged 34)
Hadibowo Susanto	4 July 1958 (aged 25)
Reserve
Eddy Kurniawan	2 July 1962 (aged 21)
Kurniahu	28 February 1959 (aged 25)
Sigit Pamungkas	22 January 1962 (aged 22)
Eddy Hartono	19 July 1964 (aged 19)

==== Japan ====
Six players represented Japan in the 1984 Thomas Cup.

Name	DoB/Age
Hiroyuki Hasegawa	19 January 1957 (aged 27)
Hiroshi Nishiyama	19 February 1960 (aged 24)
Tetsuaki Inoue	15 February 1963 (aged 21)
Shōkichi Miyamori	5 February 1958 (aged 26)
Shuji Matsuno	11 September 1963 (aged 20)
Shinji Matsuura	15 February 1964 (aged 20)

==== Malaysia ====
Seven players represented Malaysia in the 1984 Thomas Cup.

Name	DoB/Age
Misbun Sidek	17 February 1960 (aged 24)
Ong Beng Teong	29 May 1962 (aged 21)
Razif Sidek	29 May 1962 (aged 21)
Foo Kok Keong	8 January 1963 (aged 21)
Soh Goon Chup	1958 (aged 25–26)
Jalani Sidek	10 November 1963 (aged 20)
Chong Weng Kai	22 November 1965 (aged 18)

=== Group B ===
==== China ====
Six players represented China in the 1984 Thomas Cup.

Name	DoB/Age
Han Jian	6 July 1956 (aged 27)
Chen Changjie	4 January 1959 (aged 25)
Sun Zhian	1956 (aged 27–28)
Yang Yang	8 December 1963 (aged 20)
Luan Jin	20 July 1958 (aged 25)
He Shangquan	1963 (aged 20–21)
Jiang Guoliang	1965 (aged 18–19)
Tian Bingyi	30 July 1963 (aged 20)

==== Denmark ====
Eight players represented Denmark in the 1984 Thomas Cup.

Name	DoB/Age
Morten Frost	4 April 1958 (aged 26)
Jens Peter Nierhoff	2 September 1960 (aged 23)
Michael Kjeldsen	13 November 1962 (aged 21)
Ib Frederiksen	7 May 1964 (aged 20)
Claus Andersen	25 March 1951 (aged 33)
Steen Fladberg	11 October 1956 (aged 27)
Jesper Helledie	9 May 1954 (aged 29)
Mark Christiansen	21 October 1963 (aged 20)

==== South Korea ====
Eight players represented South Korea in the 1984 Thomas Cup.

Name	DoB/Age
Park Joo-bong	5 December 1964 (aged 19)
Kim Moon-soo	29 December 1963 (aged 20)
Sung Han-kook	19 November 1963 (aged 20)
Choi Byung-hak	1959 (aged 24–25)
Lee Deuk-choon	16 July 1962 (aged 21)
Park Chan-woong	1964 (aged 19–20)
Lee Taek-gi	1965 (aged 18–19)
Lim Byung-soo	1972 (aged 11–12)

==== Sweden ====
Seven players represented Sweden in the 1984 Thomas Cup.

Name	DoB/Age
Thomas Kihlström	11 December 1948 (aged 35)
Stefan Karlsson	5 November 1955 (aged 28)
Lars Wengberg	26 March 1952 (aged 32)
Ulf Johansson	16 May 1959 (aged 24)
Göran Carlsson	1959 (aged 24–25)
Torbjörn Pettersson	1954 (aged 29–30)
Pär-Gunnar Jönsson	6 August 1963 (aged 20)

== Uber Cup ==
=== Group A ===
==== Canada ====
Eight players represented Canada in the 1984 Uber Cup.

Name	DoB/Age
Denyse Julien	22 July 1960 (aged 23)
Sandra Skillings	1959 (aged 24–25)
Linda Cloutier	1961 (aged 22–23)
Claire Backhouse	13 May 1958 (aged 25)
Johanne Falardeau	1961 (aged 22–23)
Sandra Stapleton	1964 (aged 19–20)
Gillian Calder	1962 (aged 21–22)
Wendy Carter	11 March 1956 (aged 28)

==== England ====
Eight players represented England in the 1984 Uber Cup.

Name	DoB/Age
Helen Troke	7 November 1964 (aged 19)
Karen Beckman	27 March 1960 (aged 24)
Sally Podger	8 February 1962 (aged 22)
Gillian Clark	2 September 1961 (aged 22)
Gillian Gowers	9 April 1964 (aged 20)
Nora Perry	15 June 1954 (aged 29)
Jane Webster	2 August 1956 (aged 27)
Gillian Gilks	20 June 1950 (aged 33)

==== South Korea ====
Eight players represented South Korea in the 1984 Uber Cup.

Name	DoB/Age
Kim Yun-ja	15 May 1963 (aged 20)
Yoo Sang-hee	1964 (aged 19–20)
Hwang Sun-ai	18 April 1962 (aged 22)
Kim Bok-sun	1960 (aged 23–24)
Kim Yoon-sook	1960 (aged 23–24)
Chung Myung-hee	27 January 1964 (aged 20)
Cho Keum-shin	1960 (aged 23–24)
Park Hyun-sook	1971 (aged 12–13)

==== Malaysia ====
Six players represented Malaysia in the 1984 Uber Cup.

Name	DoB/Age
Kok Chan Fong	1968 (aged 15–16)
Juliet Poon	1958 (aged 25–26)
Tan Mei Chuan	1 November 1963 (aged 20)
Tan Sui Hoon	5 December 1963 (aged 20)
Khor Lay See	1960 (aged 23–24)
Katherine Teh	1955 (aged 28–29)

=== Group B ===
==== China ====
Eight players represented China in the 1984 Uber Cup.

Name	DoB/Age
Li Lingwei	4 January 1964 (aged 20)
Han Aiping	22 April 1962 (aged 22)
Zhang Ailing	17 December 1957 (aged 26)
Lin Ying	10 October 1963 (aged 20)
Wu Dixi	9 August 1962 (aged 21)
Wu Jianqiu	1962 (aged 21–22)
Xu Rong	1958 (aged 25–26)
Qian Ping	1964 (aged 19–20)

==== Denmark ====
Six players represented Denmark in the 1984 Uber Cup.

Name	DoB/Age
Kirsten Larsen	14 March 1962 (aged 22)
Rikke Sørensen	1961 (aged 22–23)
Dorte Kjær	6 February 1964 (aged 20)
Grete Mogensen	15 May 1963 (aged 20)
Birgitte Hindse	1964 (aged 19–20)
Liselotte Gøttsche	1956 (aged 27–28)

==== Indonesia ====
Eight players represented Indonesia in the 1984 Uber Cup.

Name	DoB/Age
Ivana Lie	7 March 1960 (aged 24)
Ratih Kumaladewi	1963 (aged 20–21)
Elizabeth Latief	27 March 1963 (aged 21)
Ruth Damayanti	1960 (aged 23–24)
Maria Fransisca	1959 (aged 24–25)
Imelda Kurniawan	12 October 1951 (aged 32)
Rosiana Tendean	25 August 1964 (aged 19)
Mary Harlim	1963 (aged 20–21)

==== Japan ====
Six players represented Japan in the 1984 Uber Cup.

Name	DoB/Age
Fumiko Tōkairin	1960 (aged 23–24)
Sumiko Kitada	31 March 1962 (aged 22)
Saori Kōmoto	18 March 1956 (aged 28)
Yoshiko Yonekura	7 February 1958 (aged 26)
Atsuko Tokuda	15 September 1955 (aged 28)
Mikiko Takada	1955 (aged 28–29)
