= 1988 Uber Cup knockout stage =

Badminton championships

The knockout stage for the 1988 Uber Cup in Kuala Lumpur, Malaysia began on 30 May 1988 with the semi-finals and ended on 3 June 1988 with the final.

== Qualified teams ==
The top two placed teams from each of the two groups qualified for this stage.

Group	Winners	Runners-up
A	China	Japan
B	South Korea	Indonesia

== Bracket ==
Semi-finals
China	5
Indonesia	0
Japan	0
South Korea	5

Final
China	5
South Korea	0
Third place
Indonesia	5
Japan	0

== Semi-finals ==
=== Semi-final 1 ===
China
5
Stadium Negara
30 May 1988, 19:30 UTC+8

Indonesia
0

			1	2	3
1	(China) (Indonesia)	Li Lingwei; Elizabeth Latief	11; 5	11; 2
2	(China) (Indonesia)	Han Aiping; Susi Susanti	8; 11	12; 11	12; 9
3	(China) (Indonesia)	Gu Jiaming; Kho Mei Hwa	11; 6	5; 11	11; 3
4	(China) (Indonesia)	Guan Weizhen / Lin Ying; Verawaty Fadjrin / Yanti Kusmiati	15; 10	15; 6
5	(China) (Indonesia)	Shi Wen / Zheng Yuli; Erma Sulistianingsih / Susi Susanti	15; 12	15; 17	15; 12

=== Semi-final 2 ===
South Korea
5
Stadium Negara
31 May 1988, 19:30 UTC+8

Japan
0

			1	2	3
1	(South Korea) (Japan)	Hwang Hye-young; Sumiko Kitada	11; 8	11; 3
2	(South Korea) (Japan)	Lee Young-suk; Yoko Koizumi	11; 2	11; 6
3	(South Korea) (Japan)	Lee Heung-soon; Kumiko Kitamoto	11; 4	11; 8
4	(South Korea) (Japan)	Chung So-young / Kim Yun-ja; Sumiko Kitada / Yoko Koizumi	15; 2	15; 0
5	(South Korea) (Japan)	Chung Myung-hee / Hwang Hye-young; Kimiko Jinnai / Hisako Takamine	15; 6	15; 7

== Third place ==
Indonesia
5
Stadium Negara
2 June 1988, 19:30 UTC+8

Japan
0

			1	2	3
1	(Indonesia) (Japan)	Sarwendah Kusumawardhani; Sumiko Kitada	11; 6	11; 4
2	(Indonesia) (Japan)	Susi Susanti; Kumiko Kitamoto	11; 5	11; 7
3	(Indonesia) (Japan)	Lilik Sudarwati; Hideyo Noguchi	11; 7	12; 10
4	(Indonesia) (Japan)	Verawaty Fadjrin / Susi Susanti; Sumiko Kitada / Yoko Koizumi	15; 6	15; 0
5	(Indonesia) (Japan)	Yanti Kusmiati / Dwi Elmyati; Kimiko Jinnai / Hisako Takamine	15; 13	18; 17

== Final ==
China
5
Stadium Negara
3 June 1988, 19:30 UTC+8

South Korea
0

			1	2	3
1	(China) (South Korea)	Li Lingwei; Hwang Hye-young	10; 12	11; 1	11; 3
2	(China) (South Korea)	Guan Weizhen / Lin Ying; Chung So-young / Kim Yun-ja	5; 15	18; 13	15; 7
3	(China) (South Korea)	Han Aiping; Lee Young-suk	11; 7	11; 4
4	(China) (South Korea)	Han Aiping / Zheng Yuli; Chung Myung-hee / Hwang Hye-young	9; 15	15; 10	15; 9
5	(China) (South Korea)	Gu Jiaming; Lee Heung-soon	11; 7	11; 5
