= 1986 Thomas & Uber Cup squads =

This article lists the squads for the 1986 Thomas & Uber Cup participating teams. The age listed for each player is on 22 April 1986 which was the first day of the tournament.

== Thomas Cup ==
=== Group A ===
==== Denmark ====
Eight players represented Denmark in the 1986 Thomas Cup.

Name	DoB/Age
Morten Frost	4 April 1958 (aged 28)
Jens Peter Nierhoff	2 September 1960 (aged 25)
Michael Kjeldsen	13 November 1962 (aged 23)
Ib Frederiksen	7 May 1964 (aged 21)
Poul-Erik Høyer Larsen	20 September 1965 (aged 20)
Steen Fladberg	11 October 1956 (aged 29)
Jesper Helledie	9 May 1954 (aged 31)
Mark Christiansen	21 October 1963 (aged 22)

==== Indonesia ====
Eight players represented Indonesia in the 1986 Thomas Cup.

Name	DoB/Age
Liem Swie King	28 February 1956 (aged 30)
Lius Pongoh	3 December 1960 (aged 25)
Icuk Sugiarto	4 October 1962 (aged 23)
Eddy Kurniawan	2 July 1962 (aged 23)
Hariamanto Kartono	8 August 1954 (aged 31)
Bobby Ertanto	2 August 1960 (aged 25)
Christian Hadinata	11 December 1949 (aged 36)
Hadibowo Susanto	4 July 1958 (aged 27)

==== South Korea ====
Eight players represented South Korea in the 1986 Thomas Cup.

Name	DoB/Age
Park Joo-bong	5 December 1964 (aged 21)
Kim Moon-soo	29 December 1963 (aged 22)
Sung Han-kook	19 November 1963 (aged 22)
Choi Byung-hak	1959 (aged 26–27)
Lee Deuk-choon	16 July 1962 (aged 23)
Park Sung-bae	11 January 1969 (aged 17)
Kim Joong-soo	17 April 1960 (aged 26)
Lee Sang-hee	1960 (aged 25–26)

==== Sweden ====
Eight players represented Sweden in the 1986 Thomas Cup.

Name	DoB/Age
Thomas Kihlström	11 December 1948 (aged 37)
Stefan Karlsson	5 November 1955 (aged 30)
Jonas Herrgårdh	1 September 1963 (aged 22)
Ulf Johansson	16 May 1959 (aged 26)
Stellan Österberg	17 January 1965 (aged 21)
Jan-Eric Antonsson	9 September 1961 (aged 24)
Pär-Gunnar Jönsson	6 August 1963 (aged 22)
Manfred Mellqvist	1959 (aged 26–27)

=== Group B ===
==== China ====
Eight players represented China in the 1986 Thomas Cup.

Name	DoB/Age
Han Jian	6 July 1956 (aged 29)
Yang Yang	8 December 1963 (aged 22)
Ding Qiqing	28 May 1962 (aged 23)
Xiong Guobao	1 November 1962 (aged 23)
Zhang Qiang	1963 (aged 22–23)
Li Yongbo	18 September 1962 (aged 23)
Zhou Jincan	1961 (aged 24–25)
Tian Bingyi	30 July 1963 (aged 22)

==== England ====
Eight players represented England in the 1986 Thomas Cup.

Name	DoB/Age
Nick Yates	1962 (aged 23–24)
Steve Baddeley	28 March 1961 (aged 25)
Darren Hall	25 October 1965 (aged 20)
Mike Brown	13 March 1957 (aged 29)
Richard Outterside	1962 (aged 23–24)
Andy Goode	30 January 1960 (aged 26)
Nigel Tier	3 October 1958 (aged 27)
Chris Dobson	25 December 1963 (aged 22)

==== Malaysia ====
Eight players represented Malaysia in the 1986 Thomas Cup.

Name	DoB/Age
Misbun Sidek	17 February 1960 (aged 26)
Ong Beng Teong	29 May 1962 (aged 23)
Razif Sidek	29 May 1962 (aged 23)
Foo Kok Keong	8 January 1963 (aged 23)
Cheah Soon Kit	9 January 1968 (aged 18)
Jalani Sidek	10 November 1963 (aged 22)
Chong Weng Kai	22 November 1965 (aged 20)
Rashid Sidek	8 July 1968 (aged 17)

==== Singapore ====
Eight players represented Singapore in the 1986 Thomas Cup.

Name	DoB/Age
Wong Shoon Soo	1962 (aged 23–24)
Abdul Hamid Khan	13 December 1965 (aged 20)
Lau Wing Cheok	1962 (aged 23–24)
Wong Shoon Keat	30 April 1957 (aged 28)
Tan Eng Han	1956 (aged 29–30)
Tan Khee Wee	1956 (aged 29–30)
Robert Han	1958 (aged 27–28)
Sulaiman Zaini	1956 (aged 29–30)

== Uber Cup ==
=== Group A ===
==== China ====
Eight players represented China in the 1986 Uber Cup.

Name	DoB/Age
Li Lingwei	4 January 1964 (aged 22)
Han Aiping	22 April 1962 (aged 24)
Zheng Yuli	1963 (aged 22–23)
Lin Ying	10 October 1963 (aged 22)
Wu Dixi	9 August 1962 (aged 23)
Wu Jianqiu	1962 (aged 23–24)
Guan Weizhen	15 June 1964 (aged 21)
Lao Yujing	1966 (aged 19–20)

==== Denmark ====
Eight players represented Denmark in the 1986 Uber Cup.

Name	DoB/Age
Kirsten Larsen	14 March 1962 (aged 24)
Christina Bostofte	1971 (aged 14–15)
Dorte Kjær	6 February 1964 (aged 22)
Grete Mogensen	15 May 1963 (aged 22)
Charlotte Hattens	29 August 1964 (aged 21)
Lisbet Stuer-Lauridsen	22 September 1968 (aged 17)
Gitte Paulsen	4 December 1965 (aged 20)
Nettie Nielsen	23 July 1964 (aged 21)

==== Japan ====
Eight players represented Japan in the 1986 Uber Cup.

Name	DoB/Age
Sumiko Kitada	31 March 1962 (aged 24)
Kimiko Jinnai	12 March 1964 (aged 22)
Yoshiko Yonekura	7 February 1958 (aged 28)
Harumi Kohara	24 June 1965 (aged 20)
Kazuko Takamine	26 September 1962 (aged 23)
Mieko Hirayama	1965 (aged 20–21)
Hisako Takamine	30 April 1964 (aged 21)
Kazue Hoshi	26 November 1964 (aged 21)

==== Sweden ====
Eight players represented Sweden in the 1986 Uber Cup.

Name	DoB/Age
Christine Magnusson	21 November 1964 (aged 21)
Catharina Andersson	1959 (aged 26–27)
Maria Henning	1960 (aged 25–26)
Ann Sandersson	1967 (aged 18–19)
Maria Bengtsson	5 March 1964 (aged 22)
Lilian Johansson	1959 (aged 26–27)
Anette Börjesson	11 November 1954 (aged 31)
Karin Ericsson	1961 (aged 24–25)

=== Group B ===
==== Canada ====
Eight players represented Canada in the 1986 Uber Cup.

Name	DoB/Age
Denyse Julien	22 July 1960 (aged 25)
Sandra Skillings	1959 (aged 26–27)
Linda Cloutier	1961 (aged 24–25)
Claire Sharpe	13 May 1958 (aged 27)
Johanne Falardeau	1961 (aged 24–25)
Claire Allison	1962 (aged 23–24)
Doris Piché	14 October 1965 (aged 20)
Chantal Jobin	1960 (aged 25–26)

==== England ====
Eight players represented England in the 1986 Uber Cup.

Name	DoB/Age
Helen Troke	7 November 1964 (aged 21)
Karen Beckman	27 March 1960 (aged 26)
Fiona Elliott	13 November 1963 (aged 22)
Gillian Clark	2 September 1961 (aged 24)
Gillian Gowers	9 April 1964 (aged 22)
Wendy Massam	1960 (aged 25–26)
Sara Halsall	29 September 1967 (aged 18)
Barbara Sutton	1953 (aged 32–33)

==== Indonesia ====
Eight players represented Indonesia in the 1986 Uber Cup.

Name	DoB/Age
Ivana Lie	7 March 1960 (aged 26)
Ratih Kumaladewi	1963 (aged 22–23)
Elizabeth Latief	27 March 1963 (aged 23)
Sarwendah Kusumawardhani	22 August 1967 (aged 18)
Verawaty Fadjrin	1 October 1957 (aged 28)
Yanti Kusmiati	22 December 1962 (aged 23)
Rosiana Tendean	25 August 1964 (aged 21)
Imelda Kurniawan	12 October 1951 (aged 34)

==== South Korea ====
Eight players represented South Korea in the 1986 Uber Cup.

Name	DoB/Age
Kim Yun-ja	15 May 1963 (aged 22)
Yoo Sang-hee	1964 (aged 21–22)
Hwang Sun-ai	18 April 1962 (aged 24)
Hwang Hye-young	16 July 1966 (aged 19)
Chung So-young	20 February 1967 (aged 19)
Chung Myung-hee	27 January 1964 (aged 22)
Kim Ho-ja	7 September 1968 (aged 17)
Kang Haeng-suk	20 May 1961 (aged 24)
