= 1988 Thomas & Uber Cup =

Biennial international badminton team championship

1988 Thomas & Uber Cup Piala Thomas dan Uber 1988

Tournament details
- Dates: 23 May – 4 June 1988
- Edition: 15th (Thomas Cup); 12th (Uber Cup)
- Level: International
- Nations: 8 (Thomas Cup); 8 (Uber Cup)
- Venue: Stadium Negara
- Location: Kuala Lumpur, Malaysia
- Official website: bwfthomasubercups.com

The 1988 Thomas Cup & Uber Cup was the 15th tournament of Thomas Cup and the 12th tournament of Uber Cup, the most important badminton team competitions in the world. The tournament was held from 23 May to 4 June 1988 at Stadium Negara in Kuala Lumpur, Malaysia.

China won its third title in the Thomas Cup and in the Uber Cup, after beating in the final round Malaysia and Korea, respectively.

== Host selection ==
In January 1987, Malaysia submitted their bid to host the Thomas and Uber Cup to the IBF following their success of hosting the World Badminton Grand Prix Finals in December 1986. The bid was later finalized on 6 October 1987 after IBF president Ian Palmer agreed to accept a flat US$75,000 and drop their demand on a 50-50 split on gate collection.

Kuala Lumpur was chosen as the host city for the tournament and Stadium Negara was chosen as the tournament venue.

== Qualification ==
Malaysia qualified automatically for both the Thomas Cup and the Uber Cup as hosts. China also qualified for both the Thomas Cup and the Uber Cup as trophy holders.

=== Thomas Cup ===
Means of qualification	Date	Venue	Slot	Qualified teams
Host country	6 October 1987	Kuala Lumpur	1	Malaysia
1986 Thomas Cup	22 April – 4 May 1986	Jakarta	1	China
Asian Zone	23 – 27 February 1988	New Delhi	1	India
European Zone	24 – 28 February 1988	Amsterdam	3	Denmark
European Zone	24 – 28 February 1988	Amsterdam	3	England
European Zone	24 – 28 February 1988	Amsterdam	3	Sweden
Oceania Zone	26 – 28 February 1988	Melbourne	1	Indonesia
Pan American Zone	23 – 27 February 1988	San Jose	1	South Korea
Total			8	

=== Uber Cup ===
Means of qualification	Date	Venue	Slot	Qualified teams
Host country	6 October 1987	Kuala Lumpur	1	Malaysia
1986 Uber Cup	22 April – 4 May 1986	Jakarta	1	China
Asian Zone	23 – 27 February 1988	New Delhi	1	Japan
European Zone	24 – 28 February 1988	Amsterdam	3	Denmark
European Zone	24 – 28 February 1988	Amsterdam	3	England
European Zone	24 – 28 February 1988	Amsterdam	3	Netherlands
Oceania Zone	26 – 28 February 1988	Melbourne	1	Indonesia
Pan American Zone	23 – 27 February 1988	San Jose	1	South Korea
Total			8	

== Medal summary ==
=== Medalists ===
Event	Gold	Silver	Bronze
Thomas Cup	China	Malaysia	Indonesia
Uber Cup	China	South Korea	Indonesia

=== Medal table ===
* Host nation (Malaysia)

Rank	Nation	Gold	Silver	Bronze	Total
1	China	2	0	0	2
2	Malaysia*	0	1	0	1
2	South Korea	0	1	0	1
4	Indonesia	0	0	2	2
Totals (4 entries)		2	2	2	6

== Thomas Cup ==
=== Group stage ===
==== Group A ====
Pos	Team	Pld	W	L	GF	GA	GD	PF	PA	PD	Pts	Qualification
1	China	3	3	0	30	3	+27	481	236	+245	3	Advance to semi-finals
2	Malaysia	3	2	1	20	14	+6	426	372	+54	2	Advance to semi-finals
3	England	3	1	2	11	20	−9	313	389	−76	1	
4	India	3	0	3	5	29	−24	251	474	−223	0	

Source: The Straits Times

23 May 1988
19:30 UTC+8

China	5–0	England
Report

Stadium Negara, Kuala Lumpur

24 May 1988
19:30 UTC+8

Malaysia	5–0	India
Report

Stadium Negara, Kuala Lumpur

25 May 1988
19:30 UTC+8

China	5–0	India
Report

Stadium Negara, Kuala Lumpur

26 May 1988
19:30 UTC+8

Malaysia	4–1	England
Report

Stadium Negara, Kuala Lumpur

27 May 1988
19:30 UTC+8

England	4–1	India
Report

Stadium Negara, Kuala Lumpur

28 May 1988
19:30 UTC+8

China	5–0	Malaysia
Report

Stadium Negara, Kuala Lumpur

==== Group B ====
Pos	Team	Pld	W	L	GF	GA	GD	PF	PA	PD	Pts	Qualification
1	Indonesia	3	3	0	25	7	+18	437	287	+150	3	Advance to semi-finals
2	Denmark	3	2	1	21	12	+9	415	374	+41	2	Advance to semi-finals
3	South Korea	3	1	2	13	21	−8	364	433	−69	1	
4	Sweden	3	0	3	7	26	−19	338	460	−122	0	

Source: The Straits Times

23 May 1988
19:30 UTC+8

Indonesia	5–0	Sweden
Report

Stadium Negara, Kuala Lumpur

24 May 1988
19:30 UTC+8

Denmark	4–1	Sweden
Report

Stadium Negara, Kuala Lumpur

25 May 1988
19:30 UTC+8

Indonesia	4–1	South Korea
Report

Stadium Negara, Kuala Lumpur

26 May 1988
19:30 UTC+8

Denmark	4–1	South Korea
Report

Stadium Negara, Kuala Lumpur

27 May 1988
19:30 UTC+8

Indonesia	3–2	Denmark
Report

Stadium Negara, Kuala Lumpur

28 May 1988
19:30 UTC+8

South Korea	3–2	Sweden
Report

Stadium Negara, Kuala Lumpur

=== Knockout stage ===
==== Bracket ====
Semi-finals
China	5
Denmark	0
Malaysia	3
Indonesia	2

Final
China	4
Malaysia	1
Third place
Denmark	0
Indonesia	5

==== Semi-finals ====
30 May 1988
19:30 UTC+8

China	5–0	Denmark
Report

Stadium Negara, Kuala Lumpur

31 May 1988
19:30 UTC+8

Indonesia	2–3	Malaysia
Report

Stadium Negara, Kuala Lumpur

==== Third place ====
2 June 1988
19:30 UTC+8

Indonesia	5–0	Denmark
Report

Stadium Negara, Kuala Lumpur

==== Final ====
4 June 1988
19:30 UTC+8

China	4–1	Malaysia
Report

Stadium Negara, Kuala Lumpur

1988 Thomas Cup winner

China
Third title

== Uber Cup ==
=== Group stage ===
==== Group A ====
Pos	Team	Pld	W	L	GF	GA	GD	PF	PA	PD	Pts	Qualification
1	China	3	3	0	28	2	+26	374	137	+237	3	Advance to semi-finals
2	Japan	3	1	2	14	20	−6	308	355	−47	1	Advance to semi-finals
3	Denmark	3	1	2	11	22	−11	280	347	−67	1	
4	Netherlands	3	1	2	13	22	−9	260	383	−123	1	

Source: The Straits Times

23 May 1988
19:30 UTC+8

Denmark	3–2	Netherlands
Report

Stadium Negara, Kuala Lumpur

24 May 1988
19:30 UTC+8

China	5–0	Japan
Report

Stadium Negara, Kuala Lumpur

25 May 1988
19:30 UTC+8

Japan	3–2	Denmark
Report

Stadium Negara, Kuala Lumpur

26 May 1988
19:30 UTC+8

China	5–0	Netherlands
Report

Stadium Negara, Kuala Lumpur

27 May 1988
19:30 UTC+8

Japan	2–3	Netherlands
Report

Stadium Negara, Kuala Lumpur

28 May 1988
19:30 UTC+8

China	5–0	Denmark
Report

Stadium Negara, Kuala Lumpur

==== Group B ====
Pos	Team	Pld	W	L	GF	GA	GD	PF	PA	PD	Pts	Qualification
1	South Korea	3	3	0	29	6	+23	408	224	+184	3	Advance to semi-finals
2	Indonesia	3	2	1	20	15	+5	345	264	+81	2	Advance to semi-finals
3	England	3	1	2	17	18	−1	307	308	−1	1	
4	Malaysia	3	0	3	3	30	−27	145	409	−264	0	

Source: The Straits Times

23 May 1988
19:30 UTC+8

Indonesia	5–0	Malaysia
Report

Stadium Negara, Kuala Lumpur

24 May 1988
19:30 UTC+8

South Korea	5–0	England
Report

Stadium Negara, Kuala Lumpur

25 May 1988
19:30 UTC+8

South Korea	5–0	Malaysia
Report

Stadium Negara, Kuala Lumpur

26 May 1988
19:30 UTC+8

Indonesia	3–2	England
Report

Stadium Negara, Kuala Lumpur

27 May 1988
19:30 UTC+8

England	5–0	Malaysia
Report

Stadium Negara, Kuala Lumpur

28 May 1988
19:30 UTC+8

Indonesia	1–4	South Korea
Report

Stadium Negara, Kuala Lumpur

=== Knockout stage ===
==== Bracket ====
Semi-finals
China	5
Indonesia	0
Japan	0
South Korea	5

Final
China	5
South Korea	0
Third place
Indonesia	5
Japan	0

==== Semi-finals ====
30 May 1988
19:30 UTC+8

China	5–0	Indonesia
Report

Stadium Negara, Kuala Lumpur

31 May 1988
19:30 UTC+8

South Korea	5–0	Japan
Report

Stadium Negara, Kuala Lumpur

==== Third place ====
2 June 1988
19:30 UTC+8

Indonesia	5–0	Japan
Report

Stadium Negara, Kuala Lumpur

==== Final ====
3 June 1988
19:30 UTC+8

China	5–0	South Korea
Report

Stadium Negara, Kuala Lumpur

1988 Uber Cup winner

China
Third title
