= 1988 Thomas Cup knockout stage =

Badminton championships

The knockout stage for the 1988 Thomas Cup in Kuala Lumpur, Malaysia began on 30 May 1988 with the semi-finals and ended on 4 June 1988 with the final.

== Qualified teams ==
The top two placed teams from each of the two groups qualified for this stage.

Group	Winners	Runners-up
A	China	Malaysia
B	Indonesia	Denmark

== Bracket ==
Semi-finals
China	5
Denmark	0
Malaysia	3
Indonesia	2

Final
China	4
Malaysia	1
Third place
Denmark	0
Indonesia	5

== Semi-finals ==
=== Semi-final 1 ===
China
5
Stadium Negara
30 May 1988, 19:30 UTC+8

Denmark
0

			1	2	3
1	(China) (Denmark)	Yang Yang; Morten Frost	15; 3	15; 5
2	(China) (Denmark)	Xiong Guobao; Ib Frederiksen	15; 1	15; 10
3	(China) (Denmark)	Zhao Jianhua; Torben Carlsen	15; 11	15; 7
4	(China) (Denmark)	Li Yongbo / Tian Bingyi; Max Gandrup / Thomas Lund	15; 7	15; 8
5	(China) (Denmark)	Chen Hongyong / Chen Kang; Jan Paulsen / Henrik Svarrer	12; 15	15; 0	15; 10

=== Semi-final 2 ===
Indonesia
2
Stadium Negara
31 May 1988, 19:30 UTC+8

Malaysia
3

			1	2	3
1	(Indonesia) (Malaysia)	Icuk Sugiarto; Misbun Sidek	15; 3	13; 15	15; 3
2	(Indonesia) (Malaysia)	Eddy Kurniawan; Foo Kok Keong	15; 9	15; 7
3	(Indonesia) (Malaysia)	Ardy Wiranata; Rashid Sidek	13; 18	9; 15
4	(Indonesia) (Malaysia)	Gunawan / Eddy Hartono; Jalani Sidek / Razif Sidek	15; 9	6; 15	6; 15
5	(Indonesia) (Malaysia)	Bobby Ertanto / Liem Swie King; Cheah Soon Kit / Ong Beng Teong	17; 14	1; 15	12; 15

== Third place ==
Indonesia
5
Stadium Negara
2 June 1988, 19:30 UTC+8

Denmark
0

			1	2	3
1	(Indonesia) (Denmark)	Eddy Kurniawan; Jens Peter Nierhoff	15; 3	15; 6
2	(Indonesia) (Denmark)	Ardy Wiranata; Ib Frederiksen	15; 2	15; 1
3	(Indonesia) (Denmark)	Alan Budikusuma; Torben Carlsen	15; 2	15; 4
4	(Indonesia) (Denmark)	Gunawan / Eddy Hartono; Jan Paulsen / Henrik Svarrer	15; 9	15; 6
5	(Indonesia) (Denmark)	Liem Swie King / Icuk Sugiarto; Morten Frost / Thomas Lund	17; 15	15; 5

== Final ==
China
4
Stadium Negara
4 June 1988, 19:30 UTC+8

Malaysia
1

			1	2	3
1	(China) (Malaysia)	Yang Yang; Misbun Sidek	15; 2	15; 2
2	(China) (Malaysia)	Li Yongbo / Tian Bingyi; Jalani Sidek / Razif Sidek	12; 15	1; 15
3	(China) (Malaysia)	Xiong Guobao; Foo Kok Keong	15; 2	15; 11
4	(China) (Malaysia)	Chen Hongyong / Chen Kang; Cheah Soon Kit / Ong Beng Teong	15; 12	15; 12
5	(China) (Malaysia)	Zhao Jianhua; Rashid Sidek	15; 12	15; 9
