= 1991 IBF World Championships – Men's doubles =

Men's doubles at the 1991 IBF World Championships
- Venue: Brøndby Arena
- Location: Copenhagen, Denmark
- Dates: May 2, 1991 – May 8, 1991

Medalists
gold medal	Park Joo-bong; Kim Moon-soo	South Korea
silver medal	Jon Holst-Christensen; Thomas Lund	Denmark
bronze medal	Li Yongbo; Tian Bingyi	China
bronze medal	Bagus Setiadi; Imay Hendra	Indonesia

The 1991 IBF World Championships (World Badminton Championships) were held in Copenhagen, Denmark in 1991. Following the results of the men's doubles.

== Qualification ==
- (Austria) Hannes Fuchs / Heimo Götschl - (Austria) Tariq Farooq / (Republic of Ireland) Graham Henderson: 15–7, 15–3
- (Indonesia) Ricky Subagja / Rexy Mainaky - (Poland) Piotr Mazur / Dariusz Zieba: 15–1, 15–1
- (North Korea) Ri Nam Chol / Ri Yong Hwan - (Mauritius) Beelall Bhurtun / James Moon Lin Lan: w.o.
- (Greece) Pavlos Charalambidis / (Scotland) Kevin Scott - (Switzerland) Remy Matthey de L'Etang / Thomas Wapp: 5–15, 15–12, 15–8
- (Belgium) Stefaan Cognie / Yves de Negri - (Nigeria) Danjuma Fatauchi / (Belgium) Segun Odusola: w.o.
- (Finland) Mika Heinonen / Tony Tuominen - (Bulgaria) Ivan Dobrev Ivanov / Boris Lalov: 15–6, 15–2
- (Mexico) Ernesto de la Torre / Fernando de la Torre - (Nepal) Prakash Doj Rana / Ramjee B. Shrestha: w.o.
- (Norway) Børge Larsen / Oystein Larsen - (Poland) Grzegorz Piotrowski / Damian Plawecki: 9–15, 15–7, 15–10
- (Australia) Peter Blackburn / Darren McDonald - (Hong Kong) Ng Pak Kum / Tse Bun: 15–5, 15–10
- (England) Nick Ponting / Dave Wright - (Iceland) Gudmundur Adolfsson / (United States) John Britton: w.o.
- (Thailand) Vacharapan Khamthong / Sompol Kukasemkij - (Bulgaria) Pjuzant Kassabian / (Cyprus) Nicolas Pissis: 15–8, 15–1
- (Japan) Fumihiko Machida / Koji Miya - (Iceland) Arni Thor Hallgrimsson / Broddi Kristjansson: 15–9, 15–12
- (Mauritius) Gilles Allet / Eddy Clarisse - (Guatemala) Kenneth Erichsen / (Netherlands) Edwin van Dalm: w.o.
- (Scotland) Russell Hogg / Kenny Middlemiss - (Switzerland) Hubert Müller / Christian Nyffenegger: 15–2, 15–9
- (Germany) Markus Keck / Stephan Kuhl - (Chinese Taipei) Horng Shin-Jeng / Lee Mou-Chou: 15–9, 15–12
- (Canada) David Humble / Anil Kaul - (France) Christophe Jeanjean / Etienne Thobois: 15–10, 15-5

== Main stage ==
=== Section 1 ===
First round
(South Korea) Park Joo-bong (South Korea) Kim Moon-soo	15	15
(Canada) Andrew Muir (Canada) Iain Sydie	7	4
(Austria) Hannes Fuchs (Austria) Heimo Götschl	17	15
(Czech Republic) Petr Basa (Czech Republic) Zdenek Musil	14	10
(Indonesia) Ricky Subagja (Indonesia) Rexy Mainaky	15	6	15
(Thailand) Siripong Siripool (Thailand) Pramote Teerawiwatana	11	15	8
(Sweden) Peter Axelsson (Sweden) Pär-Gunnar Jönsson	15	15
(Finland) Jyri Aalto (Finland) Lasse Lindelof	0	6
(China) Chen Hongyong (China) Chen Kang	15	15
(Malta) David Cole (Malta) Martin Farrugia	3	4
(North Korea) Ri Nam Chol (North Korea) Ri Yong Hwan	15	9	15
(Spain) Antonio Miranda (Spain) David Serrano	4	15	4
(Denmark) Mark Christiansen (Denmark) Michael Kjeldsen	15	15
(New Zealand) Dean Galt (New Zealand) Kerrin Harrison	3	2
(Germany) Kai Mitteldorf (Germany) Guido Schänzler	4	15	15
(India) Rajeev Bagga (India) Vinod Kumar	15	6	5

Second round
(South Korea) Park Joo-bong (South Korea) Kim Moon-soo	15	15
(Austria) Hannes Fuchs (Austria) Heimo Götschl	2	2
(Indonesia) Ricky Subagja (Indonesia) Rexy Mainaky	17	9	15
(Sweden) Peter Axelsson (Sweden) Pär-Gunnar Jönsson	14	15	11
(China) Chen Hongyong (China) Chen Kang	15	15
(North Korea) Ri Nam Chol (North Korea) Ri Yong Hwan	0	3
(Denmark) Mark Christiansen (Denmark) Michael Kjeldsen	15	15
(Germany) Kai Mitteldorf (Germany) Guido Schänzler	11	6

Third round
(South Korea) Park Joo-bong (South Korea) Kim Moon-soo	15	15
(Indonesia) Ricky Subagja (Indonesia) Rexy Mainaky	6	11
(China) Chen Hongyong (China) Chen Kang	15	15
(Denmark) Mark Christiansen (Denmark) Michael Kjeldsen	11	6

Quarterfinals
(South Korea) Park Joo-bong (South Korea) Kim Moon-soo	15	15
(China) Chen Hongyong (China) Chen Kang	10	5

=== Section 2 ===
First round
(Indonesia) Bagus Setiadi (Indonesia) Imay Hendra	15	15
(Russia) Igor Dmitriev (Russia) Vitali Shmakov	13	8
(Belgium) Stefaan Cognie (Belgium) Yves de Negri	15	15
(Zimbabwe) Mirko Ravizzotti (Zimbabwe) Kevin van Breda	2	5
(Malaysia) Yap Yee Guan (Malaysia) Yap Yee Hup	15	15
(Bulgaria) Jasen Borisov (Bulgaria) Slantchezar Tzankov	3	5
(France) Franck Panel (France) Stephane Renault	15	17
(Greece) Pavlos Charalambidis (Scotland) Kevin Scott	8	15
(Denmark) Jan Paulsen (Denmark) Henrik Svarrer	15	15
(England) Andy Brian Goode (England) Chris Hunt	2	3
(Mauritius) Gilles Allet (Mauritius) Eddy Clarisse	w.o.
(Pakistan) Mirza Ali Yar Beg (Pakistan) Islam Amir
(China) Huang Zhanzhong (China) Zheng Yumin	15	15
(Norway) Oyvind Berntsen (Norway) Trond Waaland	2	7
(Japan) Fumihiko Machida (Japan) Koji Miya	15	15
(Finland) Peter Serlachius (Finland) Rabbe von Hertzen	8	4

Second round
(Indonesia) Bagus Setiadi (Indonesia) Imay Hendra	15	15
(Belgium) Stefaan Cognie (Belgium) Yves de Negri	3	2
(Malaysia) Yap Yee Guan (Malaysia) Yap Yee Hup	15	15
(France) Franck Panel (France) Stephane Renault	6	4
(Denmark) Jan Paulsen (Denmark) Henrik Svarrer	15	15
(Mauritius) Gilles Allet (Mauritius) Eddy Clarisse	2	1
(China) Huang Zhanzhong (China) Zheng Yumin	18	18
(Japan) Fumihiko Machida (Japan) Koji Miya	13	15

Third round
(Indonesia) Bagus Setiadi (Indonesia) Imay Hendra	15	15
(Malaysia) Yap Yee Guan (Malaysia) Yap Yee Hup	9	2
(Denmark) Jan Paulsen (Denmark) Henrik Svarrer	15	18
(China) Huang Zhanzhong (China) Zheng Yumin	12	17

Quarterfinals
6	(Indonesia) Bagus Setiadi (Indonesia) Imay Hendra	6	15	15
(Denmark) Jan Paulsen (Denmark) Henrik Svarrer	15	14	10

=== Section 3 ===
First round
(Denmark) Jon Holst-Christensen (Denmark) Thomas Lund	18	15
(South Korea) Lee Sang-bok (South Korea) Shon Jin-hwan	15	9
(Mexico) Ernesto de la Torre (Mexico) Fernando de la Torre	15	15
(France) Jean-Frederic Massias (Grenada) Stephenson Sylvester	5	2
(Japan) Shuji Matsuno (Japan) Shinji Matsuura	15	15
(Romania) Florin Balaban (Spain) Bernardo Galmes	2	5
(Scotland) Russell Hogg (Scotland) Kenny Middlemiss	15	15
(Norway) Børge Larsen (Norway) Oystein Larsen	0	9
(Malaysia) Cheah Soon Kit (Malaysia) Soo Beng Kiang	w.o.
(Mauritius) Geenesh Dussain (Mauritius) Jean-Michel Duverge
(Germany) Markus Keck (Germany) Stephan Kuhl	15	15
(Russia) Andreij Antropov (Russia) Nikolaj Zuev	5	11
(Canada) Mike Bitten (Canada) Bryan Blanshard	12	15	15
(Netherlands) Chris Bruil (Netherlands) Alex Meijer	15	9	8
(Finland) Mika Heinonen (Finland) Tony Tuominen	15	15
(Austria) Heinz Fischer (Austria) Jürgen Koch	12	7

Second round
(Denmark) Jon Holst-Christensen (Denmark) Thomas Lund	15	15
(Mexico) Ernesto de la Torre (Mexico) Fernando de la Torre	6	2
(Japan) Shuji Matsuno (Japan) Shinji Matsuura	15	15
(Scotland) Russell Hogg (Scotland) Kenny Middlemiss	9	6
(Malaysia) Cheah Soon Kit (Malaysia) Soo Beng Kiang	15	15
(Germany) Markus Keck (Germany) Stephan Kuhl	5	5
(Canada) Mike Bitten (Canada) Bryan Blanshard	15	15
(Finland) Mika Heinonen (Finland) Tony Tuominen	1	6

Third round
(Denmark) Jon Holst-Christensen (Denmark) Thomas Lund	14	15	15
(Japan) Shuji Matsuno (Japan) Shinji Matsuura	17	3	9
(Malaysia) Cheah Soon Kit (Malaysia) Soo Beng Kiang	15	15
(Canada) Mike Bitten (Canada) Bryan Blanshard	9	8

Quarterfinals
(Denmark) Jon Holst-Christensen (Denmark) Thomas Lund	15	15
(Malaysia) Cheah Soon Kit (Malaysia) Soo Beng Kiang	4	7

=== Section 4 ===
First round
(China) Li Yongbo (China) Tian Bingyi	15	15
(Belgium) Pedro Vanneste (Belgium) Filip Vigneron	1	4
(Australia) Peter Blackburn (Australia) Darren McDonald	15	11	15
(Germany) Michael Keck (Germany) Robert Neumann	7	15	9
(Sweden) Jan-Eric Antonsson (Sweden) Stellan Österberg	w.o.
(Nigeria) Tamuno Gibson (Nigeria) Oranya Onazi
(England) Nick Ponting (England) Dave Wright	15	15
(United States) Benny Lee (United States) Thomas Reidy	4	5
(Indonesia) Rudy Gunawan (Indonesia) Eddy Hartono	15	15
(Poland) Jerzy Dolhan (Poland) Jacek Hankiewicz	5	4
(New Zealand) Nick Hall (New Zealand) Glenn Stewart	11	15	'18
(Thailand) Vacharapan Khamthong (Thailand) Sompol Kukasemkij	15	13	16
(Malaysia) Ong Ewe Chye (Malaysia) Rahman Sidek	17	15
(Malta) Simon Spiteri (Malta) Kenneth Vella	3	2
(Canada) David Humble (Canada) Anil Kaul	15	15
(Norway) Erik Lia (Norway) Hans Sperre jr.	7	8

Second round
(China) Li Yongbo (China) Tian Bingyi	15	15
(Australia) Peter Blackburn (Australia) Darren McDonald	5	4
(Sweden) Jan-Eric Antonsson (Sweden) Stellan Österberg	15	15
(England) Nick Ponting (England) Dave Wright	6	7
(Indonesia) Rudy Gunawan (Indonesia) Eddy Hartono	15	15
(New Zealand) Nick Hall (New Zealand) Glenn Stewart	8	9
(Malaysia) Ong Ewe Chye (Malaysia) Rahman Sidek	15	15
(Canada) David Humble (Canada) Anil Kaul	12	9

Third round
(China) Li Yongbo (China) Tian Bingyi	15	15
(Sweden) Jan-Eric Antonsson (Sweden) Stellan Österberg	13	2
(Indonesia) Rudy Gunawan (Indonesia) Eddy Hartono	15	15
(Malaysia) Ong Ewe Chye (Malaysia) Rahman Sidek	12	3

Quarterfinals
12	(China) Li Yongbo (China) Tian Bingyi	12	15	15
(Indonesia) Rudy Gunawan (Indonesia) Eddy Hartono	15	5	10

== Final stage ==
Quarterfinals
(South Korea) Park Joo-bong (South Korea) Kim Moon-soo	15	15
(China) Chen Hongyong (China) Chen Kang	10	5
(Indonesia) Bagus Setiadi (Indonesia) Imay Hendra	6	15	15
(Denmark) Jan Paulsen (Denmark) Henrik Svarrer	15	14	10
(Denmark) Jon Holst-Christensen (Denmark) Thomas Lund	15	15
(Malaysia) Cheah Soon Kit (Malaysia) Soo Beng Kiang	4	7
(China) Li Yongbo (China) Tian Bingyi	12	15	15
(Indonesia) Rudy Gunawan (Indonesia) Eddy Hartono	15	5	10

Semifinals
(South Korea) Park Joo-bong (South Korea) Kim Moon-soo	15	15
(Indonesia) Bagus Setiadi (Indonesia) Imay Hendra	2	12
(Denmark) Jon Holst-Christensen (Denmark) Thomas Lund	15	15
(China) Li Yongbo (China) Tian Bingyi	7	9

Finals
(South Korea) Park Joo-bong (South Korea) Kim Moon-soo	15	12	17
(Denmark) Jon Holst-Christensen (Denmark) Thomas Lund	10	15	16
