= 1995 All England Open Badminton Championships =

1995 All England Championships
Tournament details
- Dates: 14 March 1995– 18 March 1995
- Edition: 85th
- Location: Birmingham

The 1995 Yonex All England Open was the 85th edition of the All England Open Badminton Championships. It was held from 14 to 18 March 1995, in Birmingham, England.

It was a five-star tournament and the prize money was US$125,000.

== Venue ==
- National Indoor Arena

== Final results ==
Category	Winners	Runners-up	Score
Men's singles	(Denmark) Poul-Erik Høyer Larsen	(Indonesia) Hariyanto Arbi	17–16, 15–6
Women's singles	(Sweden) Lim Xiaoqing	(Denmark) Camilla Martin	11–9, 10–12, 11–3
Men's doubles	(Indonesia) Ricky Subagja & Rexy Mainaky	(Indonesia) Denny Kantono & Antonius Ariantho	15–12, 15–18, 15–8
Women's doubles	(South Korea) Gil Young-ah & Jang Hye-ock	(Indonesia) Eliza & Zelin Resiana	15–6, 15–3
Mixed doubles	(Denmark) Thomas Lund & Marlene Thomsen	(Denmark) Jon Holst-Christensen & Rikke Olsen	15–7, 15–7

== Men's singles ==
=== Section 1 ===
Round of 32
(Denmark) Poul-Erik Høyer Larsen	15	15
(Netherlands) Joris van Soerland	11	13
(Indonesia) Hendrawan	15	15
(Scotland) Bruce Flockhart	10	2
(South Korea) Ahn Jae-chang	11	15	15
(Malaysia) Muhammad Roslin Hashim	15	4	13
(Chinese Taipei) Fung Permadi	16	15	15
(Brunei) Imay Hendra	18	7	10
(Indonesia) Hermawan Susanto	15	15
(Sweden) Jens Olsson	7	2
(China) Hu Zhilan	16	15	15
(Malaysia) Kantharoopan Ponniah	18	7	6
(Indonesia) Ardy Wiranata	18	15
(England) Darren Hall	15	7
(Denmark) Henrik Sørensen	15	15
(Belgium) Pedro Vanneste	7	5

Round of 16
(Denmark) Høyer Larsen	15	15
(Indonesia) Hendrawan	8	9
(South Korea) Ahn	11	15	15
(Chinese Taipei) Permadi	15	5	9
(Indonesia) Susanto	15	15
(China) Zhilan	6	4
(Indonesia) Wiranata	10	15	18
(Denmark) Sorensen	15	2	15

Quarter-finals
(Denmark) Høyer Larsen	9	15	15
(South Korea) Ahn	15	7	12
(Indonesia) Susanto	15	15
(Indonesia) Wiranata	12	7

Semi-finals
(Denmark) Høyer Larsen	15	12	18
(Indonesia) Susanto	5	15	16

=== Section 2 ===
Round of 32
(Indonesia) Hariyanto Arbi	15	15
(Switzerland) Thomas Wapp	7	4
(Denmark) Peter Rasmussen	17	15
(South Korea) Lee Kwang-jin	14	11
(Denmark) Soren B Nielsen	12	15	15
(Indonesia) Marleve Mainaky	15	12	7
(Netherlands) Jeroen van Dijk	15	10	15
(England) Anders Nielsen	7	15	9
(Malaysia) Lo Ah Heng	15	15
(Denmark) Peter Janum	6	1
(Malaysia) Yong Hock Kin	7	15	15
(Sweden) Tomas Johansson	15	11	11
(Russia) Andrey Antropov	15	15
(Malaysia) Rashid Sidek	13	11
(South Korea) Park Sung-woo	15	15
(Indonesia) Joko Suprianto	11	4

Round of 16
(Indonesia) Arbi	15	18
(Denmark) Rasmussen	7	15
(Denmark) Nielsen	9	15	15
(Netherlands) van Dijk	15	11	5
(Malaysia) Lo	15	15
(Malaysia) Yong	7	7
(Russia) Antropov	12	17	15
(South Korea) Sung-woo	15	14	6

Quarter-finals
(Indonesia) Arbi	15	15
(Denmark) Nielsen	3	6
(Malaysia) Lo	18	15
(Russia) Antropov	17	10

Semi-finals
(Indonesia) Arbi	17	15
(Malaysia) Lo	15	0

== Women's singles ==
=== Section 1 ===
Round of 32
(Sweden) Lim Xiaoqing	11	12
(England) Joanne Muggeridge	6	10
(China) Zhang Ning	11	11
(South Korea) Lee Joo-hyun	7	3
(China) Han Jingna	11	11
(Indonesia) Yuni Kartika	9	7
(Russia) Irina Yakusheva	12	2	11
(Denmark) Mette Sørensen	11	11	6
(Indonesia) Susi Susanti	11	11
(Scotland) Gillian Martin	4	1
(China) Yao Yan	11	11
(Russia) Elena Sukhareva	2	2
(South Korea) Ra Kyung-min	11	11
(Wales) Kelly Morgan	1	1
(Russia) Elena Rybkina	11	11
(Denmark) Tanja Berg	0	8

Round of 16
(Sweden) Xiaoqing	7	11	11
(China) Zhang Ning	11	3	2
(China) Han Jingna	11	11
(Sweden) Yakusheva	6	1
(Indonesia) Susanti	8	11	11
(China) Yao Yan	11	6	7
(South Korea) Kyung-min	11	11
(Russia) Rybkina	8	7

Quarter-finals
(Sweden) Xiaoqing	11	11
(China) Han Jingna	0	8
(Indonesia) Susanti	11	11
(South Korea) Kyung-min	3	0

Semi-finals
(Sweden) Xiaoqing	12	11
(Indonesia) Susanti	11	7

=== Section 2 ===
Round of 32
(Denmark) Camilla Martin	11	11
(Japan) Masako Sakamoto	5	2
(Indonesia) Yuliani Sentosa	11	9	11
(Sweden) Margit Borg	4	12	5
(South Korea) Kim Ji-hyun	11	11
(Netherlands) Carolien Glebbeek	1	2
(China) Ye Zhaoying	11	11
(Denmark) Mette Pedersen	3	2
(Indonesia) Mia Audina	11	11
(England) Julia Mann	1	4
(Japan) Takako Ida	12	11
(Sweden) Christine Magnusson	11	9
(China) Wang Chen	12	11
(Singapore) Zarinah Abdullah	11	4
(Denmark) Lotte Thomsen	11	11
(Denmark) Gitte Sommer	3	2

Round of 16
(Denmark) Martin	11	11
(Indonesia) Sentosa	7	8
(South Korea) Ji-hyun	11	7	11
(China) Zhaoying	8	11	6
(Indonesia) Audina	10	11	11
(Japan) Ida	12	8	4
(China) Wang Chen	11	11
(Denmark) Thomsen	8	4

Quarter-finals
(Denmark) Martin	11	11
(South Korea) Ji-hyun	8	6
(Indonesia) Audina	10	12	12
(China) Wang Chen	12	11	10

Semi-finals
(Denmark) Martin	11	12
(Indonesia) Audina	6	10
