= Setiadi =

Setiadi is an Indonesian surname. Notable people with the surname include:

- Bagus Setiadi (born 1966), Indonesian badminton player
- Bernadette N. Setiadi (born 1948), Indonesian social psychologist
- Jadi Setiadi (born 1985), Indonesian weightlifter
