= Max Gandrup =

Danish badminton player

Personal information
- Born: 23 August 1967 (age 59)
- Height: 1.8 m (5 ft 11 in)

Sport
- Country: Denmark
- Sport: Badminton
- Handedness: Right
- Event: Doubles

Doubles
- BWF profile
Medal record
Men's badminton
Representing Denmark
Thomas Cup
| Bronze medal – third place | 1990 Nagoya-Tokyo | Men's team |
European Championships
| Gold medal – first place | 1990 Moscow | Mixed team |
| Silver medal – second place | 1990 Moscow | Men's doubles |
European Junior Championships
| Gold medal – first place | 1985 Pressbaum | Mixed team |
| Silver medal – second place | 1985 Pressbaum | Boys' doubles |
| Silver medal – second place | 1985 Pressbaum | Mixed doubles |

Max Gandrup (born 23 August 1967) is a Danish former badminton player from Herning BK Club. Gandrup, is a three-time medalist at the European junior championships, two-time medalist at the European championships and once a Nordic champion in 1990. His main successes along with a Gold at European championship came in European Grand Prix, where he won international competitions in Bulgaria, Sweden, Scotland, Norway, Finland & Poland besides some second-best performances in Germany, Switzerland and Taiwan.

== Achievements ==
=== European Championships ===
Men's doubles
| Year | Venue | Partner | Opponent | Score | Result |
|---|---|---|---|---|---|
| 1990 | Moscow, Soviet Union | (Denmark) Thomas Lund | (Denmark) Jan Paulsen (Denmark) Henrik Svarrer | 16–17, 6–15 | Silver |

=== European Junior Championships ===
Boys' doubles
| Year | Venue | Partner | Opponent | Score | Result |
|---|---|---|---|---|---|
| 1985 | Pressbaum, Austria | (Denmark) Johnny Borglum | (Denmark) Lars Pedersen (Denmark) Jan Paulsen | 12–15, 15–9, 8–15 | Silver |

Mixed doubles
| Year | Venue | Partner | Opponent | Score | Result |
|---|---|---|---|---|---|
| 1985 | Pressbaum, Austria | (Denmark) Charlotte Jacobsen | (Denmark) Jan Paulsen (Denmark) Marian Christiansen | 2–15, retired | Silver |

=== IBF World Grand Prix ===
The World Badminton Grand Prix sanctioned by International Badminton Federation (IBF) from 1983 to 2006.

Men's doubles
| Year | Tournament | Partner | Opponent | Score | Result |
|---|---|---|---|---|---|
| 1989 | German Open | (Denmark) Thomas Lund | (Denmark) Jan Paulsen (Denmark) Henrik Svarrer | 12–15, 15–8, 9–15 | (silver) Runner-up |
| 1989 | Scottish Open | (Denmark) Thomas Lund | (Denmark) Mark Christiansen (Denmark) Michael Kjeldsen | 15–7, 6–15, 15–10 | (gold) Winner |
| 1990 | Chinese Taipei Open | (Denmark) Thomas Lund | (Denmark) Mark Christiansen (Denmark) Michael Kjeldsen | 9–15, 17–16, 7–15 | (silver) Runner-up |
| 1990 | Finnish Open | (Denmark) Thomas Lund | (Indonesia) Imay Hendra (Indonesia) Bagus Setiadi | 17–18, 18–14, 9–15 | (silver) Runner-up |
| 1993 | Swiss Open | (Sweden) Stellan Österberg | (Sweden) Peter Axelsson (Sweden) Pär-Gunnar Jönsson | 4–15, 4–15 | (silver) Runner-up |

Mixed doubles
| Year | Tournament | Partner | Opponent | Score | Result |
|---|---|---|---|---|---|
| 1987 | Scottish Open | (Denmark) Grete Mogensen | (Denmark) Thomas Lund (Denmark) Gitte Paulsen | 13–15, 15–9, 8–15 | (silver) Runner-up |
| 1991 | Finnish Open | (England) Gillian Clark | (Denmark) Henrik Svarrer (Sweden) Maria Bengtsson | 12–15, 9–15 | (silver) Runner-up |
| 1992 | Swedish Open | (Sweden) Catrine Bengtsson | (Sweden) Pär-Gunnar Jönsson (Sweden) Maria Bengtsson | 8–15, 12–15 | (silver) Runner-up |
| 1992 | Finnish Open | (Denmark) Marlene Thomsen | (Denmark) Jan Paulsen (England) Fiona Smith | 17–15, 8–15, 15–12 | (gold) Winner |

=== IBF International ===
Men's doubles
| Year | Tournament | Partner | Opponent | Score | Result |
|---|---|---|---|---|---|
| 1986 | Bulgarian International | (Denmark) Thomas Lund | (Denmark) Jon Holst-Christensen (Denmark) Peter Jensen | 15–3, 15–12 | (gold) Winner |
| 1987 | Stockholm International | (Denmark) Thomas Lund | (Soviet Union) Andrey Antropov (Soviet Union) Vitali Shmakov | 15–6, 18–14 | (gold) Winner |
| 1990 | Nordic Championships | (Denmark) Thomas Stuer-Lauridsen | (Denmark) Jon Holst-Christensen (Denmark) Thomas Lund | 18–13, 8–15, 15–10 | (gold) Winner |
| 1992 | Polish International | (Denmark) Christian Jakobsen | (Indonesia) Rudy Gunawan Haditono (Indonesia) Dicky Purwotjugiono | 15–8, 14–18, 15–4 | (gold) Winner |
| 1992 | Uppsala International | (Denmark) Christian Jakobsen | (Sweden) Robert Larsson (Sweden) Rikard Magnusson | 15–12, 15–13 | (gold) Winner |
| 1993 | Uppsala International | (Sweden) Stellan Österberg | (Sweden) Jan-Eric Antonsson (Sweden) Mikael Rosen | 9–15, 9–15 | (silver) Runner-up |

Mixed doubles
| Year | Tournament | Partner | Opponent | Score | Result |
|---|---|---|---|---|---|
| 1992 | Polish International | (Denmark) Rikke Broen | (Denmark) Christian Jakobsen (Denmark) Marianne Rasmussen | 5–15, 1–15 | (silver) Runner-up |
| 1992 | Uppsala International | (Sweden) Astrid Crabo | (Denmark) Christian Jakobsen (Denmark) Marianne Rasmussen | 6–15, 9–15 | (silver) Runner-up |
