= 1992 World Badminton Grand Prix Finals =

Tournament details
- Dates: 16–20 December
- Edition: 10
- Total prize money: US$176,050
- Location: Kuala Lumpur, Malaysia

The 1992 World Badminton Grand Prix was the tenth edition of the World Badminton Grand Prix finals. It was held in Kuala Lumpur, Malaysia, from December 16 to December 20, 1992.

== Final results ==
Category	Winners	Runners-up	Score
Men's singles	(Malaysia) Rashid Sidek	(Indonesia) Alan Budi Kusuma	15–9, 5–15, 15–7
Women's singles	(Indonesia) Susi Susanti	(Indonesia) Sarwendah Kusumawardhani	9–11, 11–3, 11–4
Men's doubles	(Indonesia) Ricky Subagja & Rexy Mainaky	(Malaysia) Cheah Soon Kit & Soo Beng Kiang	15–11, 15–6
Women's doubles	(China) Lin Yanfen & Yao Fen	(England) Gillian Clark & Gillian Gowers	15–7, 17–16
Mixed doubles	(Denmark) Thomas Lund & Pernille Dupont	(Denmark) Jon Holst-Christensen & Grete Mogensen	15–5, 15–2
