= 1991 World Badminton Grand Prix Finals =

Tournament details
- Dates: 11–15 December
- Edition: 9
- Total prize money: US$176,050
- Location: Kuala Lumpur, Malaysia

The 1991 World Badminton Grand Prix was the ninth edition of the World Badminton Grand Prix finals. It was held in Kuala Lumpur, Malaysia, from December 11 to December 15, 1991.

== Final results ==
Category	Winners	Runners-up	Score
Men's singles	(China) Zhao Jianhua	(China) Wu Wenkai	15–4, 12–15, 15–12
Women's singles	(Indonesia) Susi Susanti	(South Korea) Lee Heung-soon	9–11, 11–8, 11–1
Men's doubles	(Malaysia) Jalani Sidek & Razif Sidek	(China) Huang Zhanzhong & Zheng Yumin	15–10, 12–15, 18–14
Women's doubles	(South Korea) Chung So-young & Hwang Hye-young	(Indonesia) Erma Sulistianingsih & Rosiana Tendean	18–15, 15–3
Mixed doubles	(Denmark) Thomas Lund & Pernille Dupont	(South Korea) Shon Jin-hwan & Gil Young-ah	11–15, 15–7, 15–9
