= Zheng Yumin =

Chinese badminton player

Zheng Yumin 郑昱闽
Personal information
- Born: 14 August 1967 (age 59) Fuzhou, China
- Height: 1.8 m (5 ft 11 in)

Sport
- Country: China
- Sport: Badminton
- Handedness: Right
- Event: Doubles

Doubles
- BWF profile
Medal record
Men's badminton
Representing China
Sudirman Cup
Bronze medal – third place	1989 Jakarta	Mixed team
Bronze medal – third place	1991 Copenhagen	Mixed team
Thomas Cup
Gold medal – first place	1990 Tokyo	Men's team
Bronze medal – third place	1992 Kuala Lumpur	Men's team
Asian Games
Gold medal – first place	1990 Beijing	Men's team
Bronze medal – third place	1990 Beijing	Mixed doubles
Asian Championships
Gold medal – first place	1989 Shanghai	Men's team
Silver medal – second place	1993 Hong Kong	Men's team
Silver medal – second place	1992 Kuala Lumpur	Men's doubles
Asian Cup
Bronze medal – third place	1991 Jakarta	Men's doubles

Zheng Yumin (Chinese: 郑昱闽, born 14 August 1967) is a former Chinese badminton player.

== Career ==
Zheng Yumin, born in Fuzhou, is the younger brother of Zheng Yuli, a former top level player who won medals in World championships and World Cup. Yumin specialised in doubles. In 1988, pairing with Lin Liwen, he won the championship in the first Youth Games. Afterwards, he entered the national team and paired with Zhejiang player Huang Zhanzhong in the men's doubles. In the 1990 Asian Games, Zheng/Huang both won the mixed team Gold Medal. In addition, Zheng won a bronze medal in Individual event with Shi Fangjing in mixed doubles. In the 1993 Asian Championships, Zheng Yumin suddenly fainted during a team match with the Indonesian team in the final. He was later diagnosed with a heart attack. After the National Games at the end of the year, Zheng immediately hung up. After retiring, Zheng Yumin was linked by her brother-in-law Yang Yang and went to Malaysia to teach for a few years. After that, he and his sister's family came to Australia to settle. In 1999, he and Wang Chen came together. Although they were 9 years apart, they finally came together and got engaged in Australia. In 2002, they moved to Hong Kong together, Wang Chen represented Hong Kong in international competitions, and Zheng Yumin became the coach of the Hong Kong men's team. In 2006, after Wang Chen won the Asian Games women's singles championship, the two talents made up a four-year postponed wedding.

== Achievements ==
=== Asian Games ===
Mixed doubles
Year	Venue	Partner	Opponent	Score	Result
1990	Beijing Gymnasium, Beijing, China	(China) Shi Fangjing	(Indonesia) Eddy Hartono (Indonesia) Verawaty Fadjrin	16–18, 12–15	Bronze

=== Asian Championships ===
Men's doubles
Year	Venue	Partner	Opponent	Score	Result
1992	Cheras Indoor Stadium, Kuala Lumpur, Malaysia	(China) Huang Zhanzhong	(Malaysia) Jalani Sidek (Malaysia) Razif Sidek	4–15, 6–15	Silver

=== Asian Cup ===
Men's doubles
Year	Venue	Partner	Opponent	Score	Result
1991	Istora Senayan, Jakarta, Indonesia	(China) Huang Zhanzhong	(Indonesia) Ricky Subagja (Indonesia) Rexy Mainaky	4–15, 8–15	Bronze

=== IBF World Grand Prix ===
The World Badminton Grand Prix sanctioned by International Badminton Federation (IBF) since from 1983 to 2006.

Men's doubles
Year	Tournament	Partner	Opponent	Score	Result
1989	China Open	(China) Huang Zhanzhong	(Malaysia) Jalani Sidek (Malaysia) Razif Sidek	15–9, 14–17, 12–15	(silver) Runner-up
1991	Finnish Open	(China) Huang Zhanzhong	(China) Chen Hongyong (China) Chen Kang	15–10, 12–15, 12–15	(silver) Runner-up
1991	Singapore Open	(China) Huang Zhanzhong	(South Korea) Park Joo-bong (South Korea) Kim Moon-soo	2–15, 4–15	(silver) Runner-up
1991	Denmark Open	(China) Huang Zhanzhong	(South Korea) Park Joo-bong (South Korea) Kim Moon-soo	15–10, 15–9	(gold) Winner
1991	China Open	(China) Huang Zhanzhong	(China) Tian Bingyi (China) Li Yongbo	8–15, 10–15	(silver) Runner-up
1991	Hong Kong Open	(China) Huang Zhanzhong	(South Korea) Shon Jin-hwan (South Korea) Lee Sang-bok	15–7, 8–15, 11–15	(silver) Runner-up
1991	Grand Prix Finals	(China) Huang Zhanzhong	(Malaysia) Jalani Sidek (Malaysia) Razif Sidek	10–15, 15–12, 15–18	(silver) Runner-up
1992	Hong Kong Open	(China) Huang Zhanzhong	(Indonesia) Rexy Mainaky (Indonesia) Ricky Subagja	13–15, 10–15	(silver) Runner-up
1992	Thailand Open	(China) Huang Zhanzhong	(Indonesia) Rexy Mainaky (Indonesia) Ricky Subagja	9–15, 15–12, 11–15	(silver) Runner-up
1993	Korea Open	(China) Huang Zhanzhong	(Denmark) Jon Holst-Christensen (Denmark) Thomas Lund	5–15, 15–10, 15–8	(gold) Winner

Mixed doubles
Year	Tournament	Partner	Opponent	Score	Result
1990	Thailand Open	(China) Wu Yuhong	(South Korea) Chung Myung-hee (South Korea) Park Joo-bong	3–15, 3–15	(silver) Runner-up

=== IBF International ===
Men's doubles
Year	Tournament	Partner	Opponent	Score	Result
1996	Australian International	(China) Zheng Yushen	(Hong Kong) Chow Kin Man (Hong Kong) Ma Che Kong	15–11, 13–15, 10–15	(silver) Runner-up
