= Jon Holst-Christensen =

Danish badminton player

Personal information
- Born: 16 June 1968 (age 58) Ringsted, Sjælland, Denmark
- Height: 174 cm (5 ft 9 in)
- Weight: 72 kg (159 lb)

Sport
- Country: Denmark
- Sport: Badminton
- Handedness: Right

Men's and Mixed Doubles
- Highest ranking: 1 (MD with Thomas Lund); 2 (XD with Grete Mogensen)
- BWF profile
Medal record
Men's badminton
Representing Denmark
World Championships
Silver medal – second place	1991 Copenhagen	Men's doubles
Silver medal – second place	1995 Lausanne	Men's doubles
Silver medal – second place	1993 Birmingham	Mixed doubles
Bronze medal – third place	1991 Copenhagen	Mixed doubles
Sudirman Cup
Silver medal – second place	1999 Copenhagen	Mixed team
Bronze medal – third place	1991 Copenhagen	Mixed team
Bronze medal – third place	1993 Birmingham	Mixed team
Bronze medal – third place	1995 Lausanne	Mixed team
Bronze medal – third place	1997 Glasgow	Mixed team
Thomas Cup
Silver medal – second place	1996 Hong Kong	Men's team
Bronze medal – third place	1998 Hong Kong	Men's team
European Championships
Gold medal – first place	1992 Glasgow	Men's doubles
Gold medal – first place	1996 Herning	Men's doubles
Gold medal – first place	1990 Moscow	Mixed doubles
Silver medal – second place	1992 Glasgow	Mixed doubles
Bronze medal – third place	1998 Sofia	Men's doubles
Bronze medal – third place	1998 Sofia	Mixed doubles
Bronze medal – third place	2000 Glasgow	Mixed doubles
European Mixed Team Championships
Gold medal – first place	1990 Moscow	Mixed team
Gold medal – first place	1996 Herning	Mixed team
Gold medal – first place	1998 Sofia	Mixed team
Gold medal – first place	2000 Glasgow	Mixed team
Silver medal – second place	1992 Glasgow	Mixed team

Jon Holst-Christensen (born 16 June 1968) is a retired male badminton player from Denmark. He is the son of 60s badminton players Bjorn Holst-Christensen and Tonny Holst-Christensen. Holst-Christensen played in men's and mixed doubles for Denmark alongside players such as Thomas Lund and Michael Sogaard.

== Career ==
Holst-Christensen has won several titles including 2 All England Open titles in both men and mixed doubles categories in 1993, 3 times European Champions (2 in men's doubles and 1 in mixed), Japan Open, and Denmark Open. Holst-Christensen also won 4 medals (3 silvers and 1 bronze) in World Championships in 1991, 1993 and 1995 and compete in 3 Olympics.

=== Summer Olympics ===
Holst-Christensen competed in badminton at the 1992 Summer Olympics in men's doubles with Thomas Lund. In the first round they defeated Dean Galt and Kerrin Harrison of New Zealand and in second round they were beaten by Razif Sidek and Jalani Sidek of Malaysia.

He also competed in badminton at the 1996 Summer Olympics in men's doubles with the same partner. They had a bye in the first round and lost against Ha Tae-kwon and Kang Kyung-jin of Korea in the second round.

In his final attempt, Holst-Christensen competed in badminton at the 2000 Summer Olympics in mixed doubles this time with Ann Jorgensen. They passed the first round against Korean pair of Lee Dong-soo and Lee Hyo-jung before losing against an English pair of Simon Archer and Joanne Goode in 3 sets.

After losing in that final Olympics, Holst-Christensen decided to retire from the sport.

== Post career ==
Holst-Christensen retired due to his desire to engage in IT industry. He is a senior director in human resources department of Velux Group which specialized in home designs and accessories.

== Achievements ==
=== World Championships ===
Men's doubles
Year	Venue	Partner	Opponent	Score	Result
1991	Brøndby Arena, Copenhagen, Denmark	(Denmark) Thomas Lund	(South Korea) Kim Moon-soo (South Korea) Park Joo-bong	10–15, 15–12, 16–17	Silver
1995	Malley Sports Centre, Lausanne, Switzerland	(Denmark) Thomas Lund	(Indonesia) Rexy Mainaky (Indonesia) Ricky Subagja	5–15, 2–15	Silver

Mixed doubles
Year	Venue	Partner	Opponent	Score	Result
1991	Brøndby Arena, Copenhagen, Denmark	(Denmark) Grete Mogensen	(South Korea) Park Joo-bong (South Korea) Chung Myung-hee	15–17, 16–18	Bronze
1993	National Indoor Arena, Birmingham, England	(Denmark) Grete Mogensen	(Denmark) Thomas Lund (Sweden) Catrine Bengtsson	15–10, 6–15, 12–15	Silver

=== European Championships ===
Men's doubles
Year	Venue	Partner	Opponent	Score	Result
1992	Kelvin Hall; Glasgow, Scotland	(Denmark) Thomas Lund	(Denmark) Jan Paulsen (Denmark) Henrik Svarrer	15–9, 15–5	Gold
1996	Herning Badminton Klub; Herning, Denmark	(Denmark) Thomas Lund	(Denmark) Michael Sogaard (Denmark) Henrik Svarrer	10–15, 15–12, 18–17	Gold
1998	Winter Sports Palace, Sofia, Bulgaria	(Denmark) Michael Søgaard	(England) Simon Archer (England) Chris Hunt	8–15, 8–15	Bronze

Mixed doubles
Year	Venue	Partner	Opponent	Score	Result
1990	Luzhniki Small Sports Arena, Moscow, Soviet Union	(Denmark) Grete Mogensen	(Sweden) Jan-Eric Antonsson (Sweden) Maria Bengtsson	15–7, 15–8	Gold
1992	Kelvin Hall; Glasgow, Scotland	(Denmark) Grete Mogensen	(Denmark) Thomas Lund (Denmark) Pernille Dupont	4–15, 15–9, 12–15	Silver
1998	Winter Sports Palace, Sofia, Bulgaria	(Denmark) Ann Jorgensen	(Denmark) Michael Sogaard (Denmark) Rikke Olsen	6–15, 12–15	Bronze
2000	Kelvin Hall International Sports Arena; Glasgow, Scotland	(Denmark) Ann Jorgensen	(Denmark) Michael Sogaard (Denmark) Rikke Olsen	5–15, 15–13, 3–15	Bronze

=== IBF World Grand Prix (27 titles, 30 runners-up) ===
The World Badminton Grand Prix sanctioned by International Badminton Federation (IBF) from 1983 to 2006.

Men's doubles
Year	Tournament	Partner	Opponent	Score	Result
1990	Dutch Open	(Denmark) Thomas Lund	(Indonesia) Bagus Setiadi (Indonesia) Ricky Subagja	15–10, 15–4	(gold) Winner
1991	Swedish Open	(Denmark) Thomas Lund	(Malaysia) Cheah Soon Kit (Malaysia) Soo Beng Kiang	14–18, 7–15	(silver) Runner-up
1991	Scottish Open	(Denmark) Thomas Lund	(Sweden) Peter Axelsson (Sweden) Par-Gunnar Jonsson	18–15, 15–11	(gold) Winner
1991	German Open	(Denmark) Thomas Lund	(Indonesia) Eddy Hartono (Indonesia) Rudy Gunawan	9–15, 11–15	(silver) Runner-up
1992	Scottish Open	(Denmark) Christian Jakobsen	(Sweden) Peter Axelsson (Sweden) Par-Gunnar Jonsson	10–15, 11–15	(silver) Runner-up
1992	German Open	(Denmark) Thomas Lund	(Indonesia) Rudy Gunawan (Indonesia) Bambang Suprianto	15–6, 2–15, 15–9	(gold) Winner
1992	Denmark Open	(Denmark) Thomas Lund	(Denmark) Jan Paulsen (Denmark) Henrik Svarrer	18–16, 15–8	(gold) Winner
1993	Korea Open	(Denmark) Thomas Lund	(China) Huang Zhanzhong (China) Zheng Yumin	15–5, 10–15, 8–15	(silver) Runner-up
1993	Scottish Open	(Denmark) Thomas Lund	(Russia) Sergey Melnikov (Russia) Nikolai Zuyev	15–4, 15–7	(gold) Winner
1993	All England Open	(Denmark) Thomas Lund	(China) Chen Hongyong (China) Chen Kang	10–15, 15–2, 15–10	(gold) Winner
1993	Canada Open	(Denmark) Thomas Lund	(China) Chen Hongyong (China) Chen Kang	15–7, 7–15, 15–4	(gold) Winner
1993	U.S. Open	(Denmark) Thomas Lund	(Indonesia) Antonius Ariantho (Indonesia) Denny Kantono	15–7, 15–7	(gold) Winner
1993	German Open	(Denmark) Thomas Lund	(Indonesia) Rexy Mainaky (Indonesia) Ricky Subagja	17–14, 15–12	(gold) Winner
1993	Denmark Open	(Denmark) Thomas Lund	(Denmark) Jan Paulsen (Denmark) Jim Laugesen	15–5, 15–5	(gold) Winner
1994	Singapore Open	(Denmark) Thomas Lund	(Indonesia) Rexy Mainaky (Indonesia) Ricky Subagja	6–15, 8–15	(silver) Runner-up
1994	German Open	(Denmark) Thomas Lund	(Indonesia) Antonius Ariantho (Indonesia) Denny Kantono	15–6, 15–2	(gold) Winner
1994	Denmark Open	(Denmark) Thomas Lund	(Indonesia) Antonius Ariantho (Indonesia) Denny Kantono	8–15, 15–5, 9–15	(silver) Runner-up
1995	Korea Open	(Denmark) Thomas Lund	(Indonesia) Rexy Mainaky (Indonesia) Ricky Subagja	6–15, 15–11, 7–15	(silver) Runner-up
1995	Swiss Open	(Denmark) Thomas Lund	(England) Simon Archer (England) Chris Hunt	15–6, 15–7	(gold) Winner
1995	Russian Open	(Denmark) Thomas Lund	(Indonesia) Tony Gunawan (Indonesia) Rudy Wijaya	15–8, 11–15, 17–14	(gold) Winner
1995	China Open	(Denmark) Thomas Lund	(China) Huang Zhanzhong (China) Jiang Xin	8–15, 11–15	(silver) Runner-up
1995	German Open	(Denmark) Thomas Lund	(Indonesia) Ade Sutrisna (Indonesia) Candra Wijaya	15–8, 15–13	(gold) Winner
1995	Denmark Open	(Denmark) Thomas Lund	(Indonesia) Tony Gunawan (Indonesia) Rudy Wijaya	16–17, 15–5, 15–6	(gold) Winner
1996	Swiss Open	(Denmark) Thomas Lund	(Indonesia) Sigit Budiarto (Indonesia) Dicky Purwotsugiono	15–12, 18–13	(gold) Winner
1996	German Open	(Denmark) Thomas Lund	(Indonesia) Seng Kok Kiong (Indonesia) Victo Wibowo	15–11, 11–15, 15–3	(gold) Winner
1997	All England Open	(Denmark) Michael Søgaard	(South Korea) Ha Tae-kwon (South Korea) Kang Kyung-jin	11–15, 16–17	(silver) Runner-up
1997	Russian Open	(Denmark) Michael Søgaard	(Denmark) Thomas Stavngaard (Denmark) Jim Laugesen	15–9, 15–13	(gold) Winner
1997	Denmark Open	(Denmark) Michael Søgaard	(Denmark) Jens Eriksen (Denmark) Jesper Larsen	14–17, 15–8, 18–13	(gold) Winner

Mixed doubles
Year	Tournament	Partner	Opponent	Score	Result
1988	Swedish Open	(Denmark) Helle Andersen	(China) Wang Pengren (China) Shi Fangjing	9–15, 6–15	(silver) Runner-up
1989	Scottish Open	(England) Gillian Gowers	(England) Michael Brown (England) Jillian Wallwork	15–6, 15–11	(gold) Winner
1990	Finnish Open	(Denmark) Grete Mogensen	(Denmark) Thomas Lund (Denmark) Pernille Dupont	14–18, 15–13, 10–15	(silver) Runner-up
1990	Swedish Open	(Denmark) Grete Mogensen	(Sweden) Jan-Eric Antonsson (Sweden) Maria Bengtsson	12–15, 15–8, 9–15	(silver) Runner-up
1990	Scottish Open	(Denmark) Grete Mogensen	(Denmark) Jesper Knudsen (Denmark) Nettie Nielsen	15–2, 15–13	(gold) Winner
1990	All England Open	(Denmark) Grete Mogensen	(South Korea) Park Joo-bong (South Korea) Chung Myung-hee	6–15, 3–15	(silver) Runner-up
1990	Dutch Open	(Denmark) Grete Mogensen	(Sweden) Par-Gunnar Jonsson (Sweden) Maria Bengtsson	11–15, 8–15	(silver) Runner-up
1990	World Grand Prix Finals	(Denmark) Grete Mogensen	(Denmark) Thomas Lund (Denmark) Pernille Dupont	15–12, 9–15, 8–15	(silver) Runner-up
1991	Japan Open	(Denmark) Grete Mogensen	(South Korea) Park Joo-bong (South Korea) Chung Myung-hee	7–15, 8–15	(silver) Runner-up
1991	Denmark Open	(Denmark) Grete Mogensen	(Denmark) Thomas Lund (Denmark) Pernille Dupont	7–15, 15–6, 7–15	(silver) Runner-up
1991	Scottish Open	(Denmark) Grete Mogensen	(Denmark) Thomas Lund (Denmark) Pernille Dupont	2–15, 15–9, 18–14	(gold) Winner
1992	Japan Open	(Denmark) Grete Mogensen	(Denmark) Thomas Lund (Denmark) Pernille Dupont	5–15, 11–15	(silver) Runner-up
1992	Scottish Open	(Denmark) Anne-Mette van Dijk	(Sweden) Jan-Eric Antonsson (Sweden) Astrid Crabo	11–15, 15–11, 10–15	(silver) Runner-up
1992	All England Open	(Denmark) Grete Mogensen	(Denmark) Thomas Lund (Denmark) Pernille Dupont	10–15, 1–15	(silver) Runner-up
1992	Malaysia Open	(Denmark) Lotte Olsen	(Denmark) Thomas Lund (Denmark) Pernille Dupont	8–15, 12–15	(silver) Runner-up
1992	Denmark Open	(Denmark) Anne-Mette van Dijk	(Denmark) Thomas Lund (Denmark) Pernille Dupont	10–15, 9–15	(silver) Runner-up
1992	World Grand Prix Finals	(Denmark) Grete Mogensen	(Denmark) Thomas Lund (Denmark) Pernille Dupont	5–15, 2–15	(silver) Runner-up
1993	Korea Open	(Denmark) Anne-Mette van Dijk	(Denmark) Thomas Lund (Sweden) Catrine Bengtsson	9–15, 15–12, 4–15	(silver) Runner-up
1993	Scottish Open	(Denmark) Pernille Nedergaard	(Denmark) Thomas Lund (Sweden) Catrine Bengtsson	2–15, 11–13	(silver) Runner-up
1993	All England Open	(Denmark) Grete Mogensen	(Denmark) Thomas Lund (Sweden) Catrine Bengtsson	8–1 retired	(gold) Winner
1994	Japan Open	(Sweden) Catrine Bengtsson	(Denmark) Michael Søgaard (England) Gillian Gowers	15–7, 15–9	(gold) Winner
1994	Swiss Open	(Sweden) Catrine Bengtsson	(Sweden) Peter Axelsson (Denmark) Marlene Thomsen	13–18, 9–15	(silver) Runner-up
1994	Singapore Open	(Denmark) Rikke Olsen	(Denmark) Thomas Lund (Denmark) Marlene Thomsen	1–15, 15–18	(silver) Runner-up
1995	Swiss Open	(Denmark) Rikke Olsen	(Denmark) Thomas Lund (Denmark) Marlene Thomsen	11–15, 14–18	(silver) Runner-up
1995	All England Open	(Denmark) Rikke Olsen	(Denmark) Thomas Lund (Denmark) Marlene Thomsen	7–15, 7–15	(silver) Runner-up
1997	Swedish Open	(Germany) Karen Neumann	(Germany) Michael Keck (Netherlands) Erica van den Heuvel	17–15, 12–15, 12–15	(silver) Runner-up
1997	Russian Open	(Denmark) Ann Jorgensen	(Denmark) Janek Roos (Denmark) Helene Kirkegaard	8–15, 15–10, 15–4	(gold) Winner
1998	Dutch Open	(Denmark) Ann Jorgensen	(China) Chen Qiqiu (China) Yang Wei	15–7, 15–6	(gold) Winner
1998	Denmark Open	(Denmark) Ann Jorgensen	(Denmark) Michael Sogaard (Denmark) Rikke Olsen	15–6, 15–14	(gold) Winner

=== IBF International (2 titles, 4 runners-up) ===
Men's doubles
Year	Tournament	Partner	Opponent	Score	Result
1990	Nordic Championships	(Denmark) Thomas Lund	(Denmark) Max Gandrup (Denmark) Thomas Stuer-Lauridsen	13–18, 15–8, 10–15	(silver) Runner-up
1992	Nordic Championships	(Denmark) Jan Paulsen	(Sweden) Peter Axelsson (Sweden) Par-Gunnar Jonsson	18–15, 15–11	(gold) Winner
1993	Hamburg Cup	(Denmark) Thomas Lund	(England) Simon Archer (England) Chris Hunt	15–8, 15–11	(gold) Winner
1997	Nordic Championships	(Denmark) Michael Søgaard	(Denmark) Jens Eriksen (Denmark) Jesper Larsen	walkover	(silver) Runner-up

Mixed doubles
Year	Tournament	Partner	Opponent	Score	Result
1989	Stockholm International	(Denmark) Dorte Kjaer	(Soviet Union) Andrey Antropov (Soviet Union) Elena Rybkina	15–7, 10–15, 6–15	(silver) Runner-up
1990	Nordic Championships	(Denmark) Grete Mogensen	(Denmark) Thomas Lund (Denmark) Pernille Dupont	8–15, 12–15	(silver) Runner-up

=== Invitation Tournament (3 titles) ===
Men's doubles
Year	Tournament	Partner	Opponent	Score	Result
1993	Copenhagen Masters	(Denmark) Thomas Lund	(Denmark) Jim Laugesen (Denmark) Henrik Svarrer	15–3, 15–3	(gold) Winner
1994	Copenhagen Masters	(Denmark) Thomas Lund	(Denmark) Michael Sogaard (Denmark) Henrik Svarrer	15–10, 15–7	(gold) Winner
1996	Copenhagen Masters	(Denmark) Thomas Lund	(South Korea) Lee Dong-soo (South Korea) Yoo Yong-sung	17–15, 15–10	(gold) Winner
