= Ricky Subagja =

Indonesian badminton player (born 1971)

Personal information
- Born: Ricky Achmad Soebagdja; 27 January 1971 (age 55) Bandung, West Java, Indonesia
- Height: 1.72 m (5 ft 8 in)

Sport
- Country: Indonesia
- Sport: Badminton
- Handedness: Right

Men's doubles
- Highest ranking: 1
Medal record
Men's badminton
Representing Indonesia
Olympic Games
Gold medal – first place	1996 Atlanta	Men's doubles
World Championships
Gold medal – first place	1993 Birmingham	Men's doubles
Gold medal – first place	1995 Lausanne	Men's doubles
Bronze medal – third place	1997 Glasgow	Men's doubles
World Cup
Gold medal – first place	1993 New Delhi	Men's doubles
Gold medal – first place	1995 Jakarta	Men's doubles
Gold medal – first place	1997 Yogyakarta	Men's doubles
Silver medal – second place	1992 Guangzhou	Men's doubles
Sudirman Cup
Silver medal – second place	1991 Copenhagen	Mixed team
Silver medal – second place	1993 Birmingham	Mixed team
Silver medal – second place	1995 Lausanne	Mixed team
Bronze medal – third place	1997 Glasgow	Mixed team
Bronze medal – third place	1999 Copenhagen	Mixed team
Thomas Cup
Gold medal – first place	1994 Jakarta	Men's Team
Gold medal – first place	1996 Hong Kong	Men's Team
Gold medal – first place	1998 Hong Kong	Men's Team
Gold medal – first place	2000 Kuala Lumpur	Men's Team
Silver medal – second place	1992 Kuala Lumpur	Men's Team
Asian Games
Gold medal – first place	1994 Hiroshima	Men's team
Gold medal – first place	1994 Hiroshima	Men's doubles
Gold medal – first place	1998 Bangkok	Men's team
Gold medal – first place	1998 Bangkok	Men's doubles
Asian Championships
Gold medal – first place	1993 Hong Kong	Men's team
Bronze medal – third place	1991 Kuala Lumpur	Men's doubles
Asian Cup
Gold medal – first place	1994 Beijing	Men's doubles
Silver medal – second place	1991 Jakarta	Men's doubles
SEA Games
Gold medal – first place	1991 Manila	Mixed doubles
Gold medal – first place	1993 Singapore	Men's team
Gold medal – first place	1995 Chiang Mai	Men's team
Gold medal – first place	1997 Jakarta	Men's team
Silver medal – second place	1991 Manila	Men's team
Silver medal – second place	1993 Singapore	Men's doubles
Silver medal – second place	1995 Chiang Mai	Men's doubles
Silver medal – second place	1997 Jakarta	Men's doubles
Bronze medal – third place	1991 Manila	Men's doubles
- Political party: Demokrat
- Spouses: Elsa Manora Nasution (m. 2000; div. 2006) Novani Citra Kresna (m. 2010; div. 2017) Khairunissa Andjani (m. 2021)

Ricky Subagja (born 27 January 1971) is a former Indonesian badminton player. He was rated among the greatest doubles specialists in the sport's history.

== Career ==
In 1993 the fast moving, faster hitting Subagja won men's doubles at the then biennial IBF World Championships in Birmingham, England with fellow countryman Rudy Gunawan. However, Subagja's regular partner for most of the 90s was another fellow countryman, the equally fast and hard-hitting Rexy Mainaky, and they formed the most successful team of the decade. Subagja and Mainaky won more than thirty international titles together, including all of badminton's major championships at least once. They captured Olympic gold at Atlanta in 1996, the IBF World Championships in 1995 at Lausanne, Switzerland (a repeat title for Subagja), and the prestigious All-England Championships back to back in 1995 and 1996. A partial listing of their other titles includes the open championships of the five strongest nations in men's badminton: China (1992), Indonesia (1993, 1994, 1998, 1999), Malaysia (1993, 1994, 1997), South Korea (1995, 1996), and Denmark (1998); as well as the World Badminton Grand Prix (1992, 1994, 1996), the Badminton World Cup (1993, 1995, 1997), and the quadrennial Asian Games (1994, 1998).

Subagja and Mainaky were bronze medalists at the 1997 IBF World Championships in Glasgow, Scotland. They were eliminated in the quarterfinals at both the 1992 Olympics in Barcelona and the 2000 Olympics in Sydney. They paired together on Indonesian Thomas Cup (men's international) teams that won four consecutive world team titles in 1994, 1996, 1998 and 2000

== Awards and nominations ==
Award	Year	Category	Result	Ref.
Badminton World Federation Awards	2009	Badminton Hall of Fame	Honored	
Candra Wijaya International Badminton Centre Awards	2017	The best men's doubles legend with Rexy Mainaky	Honored	

== Achievements ==
=== Olympic Games ===
Men's doubles
Year	Venue	Partner	Opponent	Score	Result
1996	GSU Sports Arena, Atlanta, United States	(Indonesia) Rexy Mainaky	(Malaysia) Yap Kim Hock (Malaysia) Cheah Soon Kit	5–15, 15–13, 15–12	Gold

=== World Championships ===
Men's doubles
Year	Venue	Partner	Opponent	Score	Result
1997	Scotstoun Centre, Glasgow, Scotland	(Indonesia) Rexy Mainaky	(Malaysia) Yap Kim Hock (Malaysia) Cheah Soon Kit	9–15, 15–2, 12–15	Bronze
1995	Malley Sports Centre, Lausanne, Switzerland	(Indonesia) Rexy Mainaky	(Denmark) Jon Holst-Christensen (Denmark) Thomas Lund	15–5, 15–2	Gold
1993	National Indoor Arena, Birmingham, England	(Indonesia) Rudy Gunawan	(Malaysia) Cheah Soon Kit (Malaysia) Soo Beng Kiang	15–11, 15–3	Gold

=== World Cup ===
Men's doubles
Year	Venue	Partner	Opponent	Score	Result
1997	Among Rogo Sports Hall, Yogyakarta, Indonesia	(Indonesia) Rexy Mainaky	(South Korea) Lee Dong-soo (South Korea) Yoo Yong-sung	15–1, 10–15, 15–3	Gold
1995	Istora Senayan, Jakarta, Indonesia	(Indonesia) Rexy Mainaky	(Thailand) Sakrapee Thongsari (Thailand) Pramote Teerawiwatana	15–4, 15–9	Gold
1993	Indira Gandhi Arena, New Delhi, India	(Indonesia) Rexy Mainaky	(China) Chen Kang (China) Chen Hongyong	15–7, 12–15, 15–9	Gold
1992	Guangdong Gymnasium, Guangzhou, China	(Indonesia) Rexy Mainaky	(Malaysia) Cheah Soon Kit (Malaysia) Soo Beng Kiang	10–15, 11–15	Silver

=== Asian Games ===
Men's doubles
Year	Venue	Partner	Opponent	Score	Result
1998	Thammasat Gymnasium 2, Bangkok, Thailand	(Indonesia) Rexy Mainaky	(Thailand) Pramote Teerawiwatana (Thailand) Siripong Siripool	15–5, 15–10	Gold
1994	Tsuru Memorial Gymnasium, Hiroshima, Japan	(Indonesia) Rexy Mainaky	(Malaysia) Cheah Soon Kit (Malaysia) Soo Beng Kiang	15–10, 15–2	Gold

=== Asian Championships ===
Men's doubles
Year	Venue	Partner	Opponent	Score	Result
1991	Cheras Indoor Stadium, Kuala Lumpur, Malaysia	(Indonesia) Richard Mainaky	(China) Chen Kang (China) Chen Hongyong	11–15, 15–12, 14–17	Bronze

=== Asian Cup ===
Men's doubles
Year	Venue	Partner	Opponent	Score	Result
1994	Beijing Gymnasium, Beijing, China	(Indonesia) Rexy Mainaky	(Malaysia) Cheah Soon Kit (Malaysia) Soo Beng Kiang	15–8, 15–7	Gold
1991	Istora Senayan, Jakarta, Indonesia	(Indonesia) Rexy Mainaky	(Malaysia) Cheah Soon Kit (Malaysia) Soo Beng Kiang	16-17, 5–15	Silver

=== SEA Games ===
Men's doubles
Year	Venue	Partner	Opponent	Score	Result
1997	Asia-Africa hall, Gelora Bung Karno Sports Complex; Jakarta, Indonesia	(Indonesia) Rexy Mainaky	(Indonesia) Sigit Budiarto (Indonesia) Candra Wijaya	4–15, 17–14, 11–15	Silver
1995	Gymnasium 3, 700th Anniversary Sport Complex; Chiang Mai, Thailand	(Indonesia) Rexy Mainaky	(Malaysia) Yap Kim Hock (Malaysia) Cheah Soon Kit	13–15, 9–15	Silver
1993	Singapore Badminton Hall; Singapore	(Indonesia) Rexy Mainaky	(Malaysia) Cheah Soon Kit (Malaysia) Soo Beng Kiang	7–15, 15–11, 7–15	Silver
1991	Camp Crame Gymnasium; Manila, Philippines	(Indonesia) Rexy Mainaky	(Malaysia) Jalani Sidek (Malaysia) Razif Sidek	6–15, 15–12, 6–15	Bronze

Mixed doubles
Year	Venue	Partner	Opponent	Score	Result
1991	Camp Crame Gymnasium; Manila, Philippines	(Indonesia) Rosiana Tendean	(Indonesia) Rexy Mainaky (Indonesia) Erma Sulistianingsih	15–6, 15–13	Gold

=== World Junior Championships ===
The Bimantara World Junior Championships was an international invitation badminton tournament for junior players. It was held in Jakarta, Indonesia from 1987 to 1991.

Boys' singles
Year	Venue	Opponent	Score	Result
1988	Jakarta, Indonesia	(China) Wu Wenkai	11–15, 3–15	Bronze

Boys' doubles
Year	Venue	Partner	Opponent	Score	Result
1987	Jakarta, Indonesia	(Indonesia) Imay Hendra	(South Korea) Choi Sang-bum (South Korea) Ahn Jae-chang	11–15, 14–17	Bronze
1988	Jakarta, Indonesia	(Indonesia) Aras Razak	(Indonesia) Yudi Yudono (Indonesia) Darma	15–8, 15–6	Gold

Mixed doubles
Year	Venue	Partner	Opponent	Score	Result
1987	Jakarta, Indonesia	(Indonesia) Lilik Sudarwati	(Indonesia) Ardy Wiranata (Indonesia) Susi Susanti	15–7, 7–15, 9–15	Silver
1988	Jakarta, Indonesia	(Indonesia) Lilik Sudarwati	(South Korea) Choi Ji-tae (South Korea) Bang Soo-hyun	15–12, 15–7	Gold

=== IBF World Grand Prix (28 titles, 11 runners-up) ===
The World Badminton Grand Prix sanctioned by International Badminton Federation (IBF) since 1983.

Men's doubles
Year	Tournament	Partner	Opponent	Score	Result
2000	Korea Open	(Indonesia) Rexy Mainaky	(South Korea) Lee Dong-soo (South Korea) Yoo Yong-sung	8–15, 15–9, 4–15	(silver) Runner-up
1999	Indonesia Open	(Indonesia) Rexy Mainaky	(Indonesia) Tony Gunawan (Indonesia) Candra Wijaya	15–12, 15–8	(gold) Winner
1998	Indonesia Open	(Indonesia) Rexy Mainaky	(Indonesia) Flandy Limpele (Indonesia) Eng Hian	15–5, 15–4	(gold) Winner
1998	Denmark Open	(Indonesia) Rexy Mainaky	(Indonesia) Flandy Limpele (Indonesia) Eng Hian	15–11, 15–6	(gold) Winner
1998	Singapore Open	(Indonesia) Rexy Mainaky	(Indonesia) Sigit Budiarto (Indonesia) Candra Wijaya	5–15, 5–15	(silver) Runner-up
1997	Vietnam Open	(Indonesia) Rexy Mainaky	(South Korea) Lee Dong-soo (South Korea) Yoo Yong-sung	15–11, 15–5	(gold) Winner
1997	Malaysia Open	(Indonesia) Rexy Mainaky	(Indonesia) Antonius Ariantho (Indonesia) Denny Kantono	17–15, 15–12	(gold) Winner
1997	Japan Open	(Indonesia) Rexy Mainaky	(Indonesia) Antonius Ariantho (Indonesia) Denny Kantono	15–11, 7–15, 15–7	(gold) Winner
1996	World Grand Prix Finals	(Indonesia) Rexy Mainaky	(Malaysia) Yap Kim Hock (Malaysia) Cheah Soon Kit	15–4, 15–9	(gold) Winner
1996	China Open	(Indonesia) Rexy Mainaky	(Indonesia) Sigit Budiarto (Indonesia) Candra Wijaya	12–15, 5–15	(silver) Runner-up
1996	All England Open	(Indonesia) Rexy Mainaky	(Malaysia) Yap Kim Hock (Malaysia) Cheah Soon Kit	15–6, 15–5	(gold) Winner
1996	Korea Open	(Indonesia) Rexy Mainaky	(Malaysia) Yap Kim Hock (Malaysia) Cheah Soon Kit	15–5, 17–14	(gold) Winner
1996	Japan Open	(Indonesia) Rexy Mainaky	(Indonesia) Rudy Gunawan (Indonesia) Bambang Suprianto	15–8, 12–15, 15–12	(gold) Winner
1995	Singapore Open	(Indonesia) Rexy Mainaky	(Indonesia) Antonius Ariantho (Indonesia) Denny Kantono	15–7, 18–16	(gold) Winner
1995	All England Open	(Indonesia) Rexy Mainaky	(Indonesia) Antonius Ariantho (Indonesia) Denny Kantono	15–12, 15–18, 15–8	(gold) Winner
1995	Japan Open	(Indonesia) Rexy Mainaky	(Indonesia) Rudy Gunawan (Indonesia) Bambang Suprianto	15–8, 15–9	(gold) Winner
1995	Korea Open	(Indonesia) Rexy Mainaky	(Denmark) Jon Holst-Christensen (Denmark) Thomas Lund	15–6, 11–15, 15–7	(gold) Winner
1994	World Grand Prix Finals	(Indonesia) Rexy Mainaky	(Indonesia) Rudy Gunawan (Indonesia) Bambang Suprianto	15–10, 15–7	(gold) Winner
1994	Hong Kong Open	(Indonesia) Rexy Mainaky	(Indonesia) Rudy Gunawan (Indonesia) Bambang Suprianto	15–12, 14–17, 15–7	(gold) Winner
1994	Indonesia Open	(Indonesia) Rexy Mainaky	(Indonesia) Rudy Gunawan (Indonesia) Bambang Suprianto	10–15, 15–4, 18–17	(gold) Winner
1994	Singapore Open	(Indonesia) Rexy Mainaky	(Denmark) Jon Holst-Christensen (Denmark) Thomas Lund	15–6, 15–8	(gold) Winner
1994	Malaysia Open	(Indonesia) Rexy Mainaky	(Thailand) Sakrapee Thongsari (Thailand) Pramote Teerawiwatana	15–5, 18–16	(gold) Winner
1994	All England Open	(Indonesia) Rexy Mainaky	(Indonesia) Rudy Gunawan (Indonesia) Bambang Suprianto	12–15, 12–15	(silver) Runner-up
1994	Swedish Open	(Indonesia) Rexy Mainaky	(Sweden) Peter Axelsson (Sweden) Pär-Gunnar Jönsson	15–11, 15–12	(gold) Winner
1994	Korea Open	(Indonesia) Denny Kantono	(Sweden) Peter Axelsson (Sweden) Pär-Gunnar Jönsson	14–17, 7–15	(silver) Runner-up
1994	Japan Open	(Indonesia) Denny Kantono	(Thailand) Sakrapee Thongsari (Thailand) Pramote Teerawiwatana	15–11, 12–15, 18–16	(gold) Winner
1993	World Grand Prix Finals	(Indonesia) Rexy Mainaky	(Indonesia) Rudy Gunawan (Indonesia) Bambang Suprianto	15–11, 10–15, 9–15	(silver) Runner-up
1993	German Open	(Indonesia) Rexy Mainaky	(Denmark) Jon Holst-Christensen (Denmark) Thomas Lund	14–17, 12–15	(silver) Runner-up
1993	Indonesia Open	(Indonesia) Rexy Mainaky	(Indonesia) Eddy Hartono (Indonesia) Richard Mainaky	15–13 15–10	(gold) Winner
1993	Malaysia Open	(Indonesia) Rexy Mainaky	(Malaysia) Cheah Soon Kit (Malaysia) Soo Beng Kiang	15–7, 15–5	(gold) Winner
1993	Swedish Open	(Indonesia) Rexy Mainaky	(Sweden) Peter Axelsson (Sweden) Pär-Gunnar Jönsson	15–12, 15–10	(gold) Winner
1992	World Grand Prix Finals	(Indonesia) Rexy Mainaky	(Malaysia) Cheah Soon Kit (Malaysia) Soo Beng Kiang	15–11, 15–6	(gold) Winner
1992	Thailand Open	(Indonesia) Rexy Mainaky	(China) Huang Zhanzhong (China) Zheng Yumin	15–9, 12–15, 15–11	(gold) Winner
1992	Hong Kong Open	(Indonesia) Rexy Mainaky	(China) Huang Zhanzhong (China) Zheng Yumin	15–13, 15–10	(gold) Winner
1992	China Open	(Indonesia) Rexy Mainaky	(Malaysia) Razif Sidek (Malaysia) Jalani Sidek	17–15, 15–11	(gold) Winner
1992	Indonesia Open	(Indonesia) Rexy Mainaky	(Indonesia) Eddy Hartono (Indonesia) Rudy Gunawan	12–15, 5–15	(silver) Runner-up
1991	U.S. Open	(Indonesia) Rexy Mainaky	(Malaysia) Razif Sidek (Malaysia) Jalani Sidek	13–18, 15–13, 3–15	(silver) Runner-up
1991	Canadian Open	(Indonesia) Rexy Mainaky	(Malaysia) Razif Sidek (Malaysia) Jalani Sidek	11–15, 12–15	(silver) Runner-up
1990	Dutch Open	(Indonesia) Bagus Setiadi	(Denmark) Jon Holst-Christensen (Denmark) Thomas Lund	10–15, 4–15	(silver) Runner-up

IBF Grand Prix tournament
IBF Grand Prix Finals tournament

=== IBF International (1 title, 1 runners-up) ===
Men's doubles
Year	Tournament	Partner	Opponent	Score	Result
1992	French Open	(Indonesia) Rexy Mainaky	(China) Li Yongbo (China) Tian Bingyi	16–18, 12–15	(silver) Runner-up
1991	Polish International	(Indonesia) Richard Mainaky	(Indonesia) Rudy Gunawan Haditono (Indonesia) Dicky Purwotjugiono	15–12, 15–1	(gold) Winner

=== IBF Junior International (1 title) ===
Boys' doubles
Year	Tournament	Partner	Opponent	Score	Result	Ref.
1987	Duinwijck Junior	(Indonesia) Nunung Murdijanto	(Denmark) Thomas Olsen (Denmark) Frederik Lindqvist	12–15, 15–8, 15–6	(gold) Winner	
