= 1993 IBF World Championships =

Tournament details
- Dates: 31 May – 6 June
- Edition: 8th
- Level: International
- Venue: National Indoor Arena
- Location: Birmingham, England

The 1993 IBF World hampionships (World Badminton Championships) were held in Birmingham, England in 1993.

== Medalists ==
=== Medal table ===
* Host nation (England)

Rank	Nation	Gold	Silver	Bronze	Total
1	Indonesia	3	1	2	6
2	China	1	1	3	5
3	Denmark	0.5	1	2	3.5
4	Sweden	0.5	0	1	1.5
5	South Korea	0	1	1	2
6	Malaysia	0	1	0	1
7	England*	0	0	1	1
Totals (7 entries)		5	5	10	20

=== Events ===
Event	Gold	Silver	Bronze
Men's Singles	(Indonesia) Joko Suprianto	(Indonesia) Hermawan Susanto	(Denmark) Thomas Stuer-Lauridsen
Men's Singles	(Indonesia) Joko Suprianto	(Indonesia) Hermawan Susanto	(Indonesia) Ardy Wiranata
Women's Singles	(Indonesia) Susi Susanti	(South Korea) Bang Soo-hyun	(China) Ye Zhaoying
Women's Singles	(Indonesia) Susi Susanti	(South Korea) Bang Soo-hyun	(China) Tang Jiuhong
Men's Doubles	(Indonesia) Ricky Subagja (Indonesia) Rudy Gunawan	(Malaysia) Cheah Soon Kit (Malaysia) Soo Beng Kiang	(Sweden) Peter Axelsson (Sweden) Pär-Gunnar Jönsson
Men's Doubles	(Indonesia) Ricky Subagja (Indonesia) Rudy Gunawan	(Malaysia) Cheah Soon Kit (Malaysia) Soo Beng Kiang	(China) Chen Kang (China) Chen Hongyong
Women's Doubles	(China) Nong Qunhua (China) Zhou Lei	(China) Chen Ying (China) Wu Yuhong	(South Korea) Chung So-young (South Korea) Gil Young-ah
Women's Doubles	(China) Nong Qunhua (China) Zhou Lei	(China) Chen Ying (China) Wu Yuhong	(Denmark) Lotte Olsen (Denmark) Lisbeth Stuer-Lauridsen
Mixed Doubles	(Denmark) Thomas Lund (Sweden) Catrine Bengtsson	(Denmark) Jon Holst-Christensen (Denmark) Grete Mogensen	(England) Nick Ponting (England) Gillian Clark
Mixed Doubles	(Denmark) Thomas Lund (Sweden) Catrine Bengtsson	(Denmark) Jon Holst-Christensen (Denmark) Grete Mogensen	(Indonesia) Aryono Miranat (Indonesia) Eliza Nathanael
