= Wu Wenkai =

Chinese badminton player

Wu Wenkai 吴文凯
Personal information
- Born: 28 November 1970 (age 55) Wuming district, Guangxi, China
- Height: 1.86 m (6 ft 1 in)

Sport
- Country: China
- Sport: Badminton
- Handedness: Left
- BWF profile
Medal record
Men's badminton
Representing China
World Cup
Gold medal – first place	1990 Bandung & Jakarta	Men's singles
Bronze medal – third place	1991 Macau	Men's singles
Sudirman Cup
Bronze medal – third place	1991 Copenhagen	Mixed team
Bronze medal – third place	1993 Birmingham	Mixed team
Thomas Cup
Gold medal – first place	1990 Tokyo	Men's team
Bronze medal – third place	1992 Kuala Lumpur	Men's team
Asian Games
Gold medal – first place	1990 Beijing	Men's team
Asian Championships
Gold medal – first place	1989 Shanghai	Men's team
Silver medal – second place	1993 Hong Kong	Men's team
Bronze medal – third place	1991 Kuala Lumpur	Men's singles

Wu Wenkai (born 28 November 1970) is a Chinese badminton player. He competed in the men's singles tournament at the 1992 Summer Olympics.

== Achievements ==
=== World Cup ===
Men's singles
Year	Venue	Opponent	Score	Result
1990	Istora Senayan, Jakarta, Indonesia	(China) Zhao Jianhua	15–6, 15–7	Gold
1991	Macau Forum, Macau	(Indonesia) Ardy Wiranata	16–18, 3–15	Bronze

=== Asian Championships ===
Men's singles
Year	Venue	Opponent	Score	Result
1991	Cheras Indoor Stadium, Kuala Lumpur, Malaysia	(Malaysia) Rashid Sidek	15–4, 7–15, 9–15	Bronze

=== IBF World Grand Prix ===
The World Badminton Grand Prix sanctioned by International Badminton Federation (IBF) from 1983 to 2006.

Men's singles
Year	Tournament	Opponent	Score	Result
1988	Malaysia Open	(China) Xiong Guobao	15–11, 6–15, 2–15	(silver) Runner-up
1989	Hong Kong Open	(Malaysia) Foo Kok Keong	15–11, 15–11	(gold) Winner
1991	Japan Open	(Indonesia) Ardy Wiranata	15–12, 4–15, 7–15	(silver) Runner-up
1991	Hong Kong Open	(China) Liu Jun	10–15, 10–15	(silver) Runner-up
1991	Korea Open	(Indonesia) Joko Suprianto	15–6, 15–2	(gold) Winner
1991	World Grand Prix Finals	(China) Zhao Jianhua	9–15, 15–5, 7–15	(silver) Runner-up
1992	Korea Open	(Indonesia) Alan Budi Kusuma	15–7, 15–11	(gold) Winner
1992	China Open	(Indonesia) Hermawan Susanto	13–18, 9–15	(silver) Runner-up
1992	Hong Kong Open	(Indonesia) Hariyanto Arbi	15–4, 15–13	(gold) Winner
