= 1993 Asian Badminton Championships =

Badminton championships

Tournament details
- Dates: 31 March – 4 April
- Edition: 12
- Venue: Queen Elizabeth Stadium
- Location: Hong Kong

The 1993 Asian Badminton Championships (officially, Seiko Asian Badminton Men's Team Championships) was the 12th edition of Badminton Asia Championships. It took place from March 31 to April 4, 1993 at the Queen Elizabeth Stadium in Hong Kong. Only the team competition for men's teams was held. Indonesian Men's team won the crown.

== Men's team medalists ==
Event	Gold	Silver	Bronze
Men's team	Indonesia; Imay Hendra; Bagus Setiadi; Ardy Wiranata; Alan Budikusuma; Hermawan Susanto; Rexy Mainaky; Ricky Subagja; Heryanto Arbi	China; Chen Kang; Wang Zhengwen; Zheng Yumin; Huang Zhanzhong; Wu Wenkai; Liu Jun; Chen Hongyong; Deng Xiaojian	Malaysia; Foo Kok Keong; Cheah Soon Kit; Soo Beng Kiang; Yong Hock Kin; Yap Yee Guan; Yap Yee Hup; Ong Ewe Hock; Pang Chen
Men's team	Indonesia; Imay Hendra; Bagus Setiadi; Ardy Wiranata; Alan Budikusuma; Hermawan Susanto; Rexy Mainaky; Ricky Subagja; Heryanto Arbi	China; Chen Kang; Wang Zhengwen; Zheng Yumin; Huang Zhanzhong; Wu Wenkai; Liu Jun; Chen Hongyong; Deng Xiaojian	Chinese Taipei; Lin Wei-chen; Horng Shin-jeng; Huang Chuan-chen; Liu En-hung; Lee Mou-chou; Chang Jeng-shyuang; Yang Shih-jeng; Ger Shin-ming

== Tournament ==
=== Venue ===
The tournament was held at the Queen Elizabeth Stadium in Hong Kong.

=== Teams ===
A total of 18 countries participated in the competition. Eight teams will compete in Division 1 and the remaining teams will compete in Division 2. Due to the withdrawal of Iran and Myanmar, the competition format for Division 2 was later changed from group elimination to knockout rounds.

Division 1

- China
- Indonesia
- Hong Kong (hosts)
- Japan
- South Korea
- Malaysia
- Chinese Taipei
- Thailand

Division 2

- Bangladesh
- Brunei
- India
- ~~Iran~~ (withdrew)
- Macau
- ~~Myanmar~~ (withdrew)
- Nepal
- Philippines
- Sri Lanka
- Syria

=== Draw ===
The draw was announced in March 1993. A total of eight countries were set to compete in the first division of the men's team championships. The team consists of two groups, Group A and Group B. The two teams that finish top of each group will qualify for the knockout stage.

Group A	Group B
China; Japan; Malaysia; Hong Kong	Indonesia; South Korea; Chinese Taipei; Thailand

== Division 1 ==
=== Group stage ===
All times are Hong Kong Time (UTC+08:00).

==== Group A ====
Pos	Team	Pld	W	L	MF	MA	MD	GF	GA	GD	Pts	Qualification
1	China	2	2	0	15	0	+15	28	2	+26	3	Knockout stage
2	Malaysia	2	1	1	10	5	+5	21	10	+11	2	Knockout stage
3	Hong Kong (H)	2	0	2	4	11	−7	10	23	−13	1	
4	Japan	2	0	2	1	14	−13	4	28	−24	0	

China
5
Queen Elizabeth Stadium
31 March 1993

Hong Kong
0

			1	2	3
1	(China) (Hong Kong)	Wu Wenkai; Chan Kin Ngai	15; 12	15; 7
2	(China) (Hong Kong)	Chen Hongyong / Chen Kang; Chan Siu Kwong / Ng Pak Kum	15; 11	15; 10
3	(China) (Hong Kong)	Liu Jun; Wong Wai Lap	18; 16	15; 3
4	(China) (Hong Kong)	Huang Zhanzhong / Zheng Yumin; Wong Wai Lap / Chow Kin Man	15; 4	15; 10
5	(China) (Hong Kong)	Wan Zhengwen; Ng Liang Hua	15; 1	11; 15	15; 9

Malaysia
5
Queen Elizabeth Stadium
31 March 1993

Japan
0

			1	2	3
1	(Malaysia) (Japan)	Foo Kok Keong; Kazuhiro Shimogami	15; 1	15; 7
2	(Malaysia) (Japan)	Cheah Soon Kit / Soo Beng Kiang; Fumihiko Machida / Koji Miya	15; 4	15; 5
3	(Malaysia) (Japan)	Yong Hock Kin; Hideaki Motoyama	15; 11	15; 10
4	(Malaysia) (Japan)	Yap Yee Guan / Yap Yee Hup; Takuya Katayama / Yuzo Kubota	15; 3	15; 8
5	(Malaysia) (Japan)	Pang Chen; Seiichi Watanabe	7; 15	15; 4	15; 7

China
5
Queen Elizabeth Stadium
1 April 1993

Japan
0

			1	2	3
1	(China) (Japan)	Liu Jun; Kazuhiro Shimogami	15; 7	15; 2
2	(China) (Japan)	Chen Hongyong / Chen Kang; Fumihiko Machida / Koji Miya	15; 12	15; 8
3	(China) (Japan)	Wan Zhengwen; Hideaki Motoyama	15; 5	15; 2
4	(China) (Japan)	Huang Zhanzhong / Zheng Yumin; Takuya Katayama / Yuzo Kubota	15; 8	15; 6
5	(China) (Japan)	Deng Xiaojian; Seiichi Watanabe	15; 7	15; 8

Malaysia
5
Queen Elizabeth Stadium
1 April 1993

Hong Kong
0

			1	2	3
1	(Malaysia) (Hong Kong)	Foo Kok Keong; Wong Wai Lap	12; 15	15; 3	15; 9
2	(Malaysia) (Hong Kong)	Cheah Soon Kit / Soo Beng Kiang; Chan Siu Kwong / Chow Kin Man	15; 6	15; 4
3	(Malaysia) (Hong Kong)	Yong Hock Kin; Ng Liang Hua	18; 3	15; 7
4	(Malaysia) (Hong Kong)	Yap Yee Guan / Yap Yee Hup; Chan Kin Ngai / Ng Pak Kum	15; 3	15; 11
5	(Malaysia) (Hong Kong)	Ong Ewe Hock; Tam Kai Chuen	15; 9	15; 10

Malaysia
0
Queen Elizabeth Stadium
2 April 1993

China
5

			1	2	3
1	(Malaysia) (China)	Yong Hock Kin; Wu Wenkai	12; 15	10; 15
2	(Malaysia) (China)	Yap Yee Guan / Yap Yee Hup; Chen Hongyong / Chen Kang	8; 15	11; 15
3	(Malaysia) (China)	Pang Chen; Liu Jun	3; 15	5; 15
4	(Malaysia) (China)	Cheah Soon Kit / Ong Ewe Hock; Huang Zhanzhong / Zheng Yumin				w/o
5	(Malaysia) (China)	Ong Ewe Hock; Wan Zhengwen	15; 7	4; 15	16; 18

Hong Kong
4
Queen Elizabeth Stadium
2 April 1993

Japan
1

			1	2	3
1	(Hong Kong) (Japan)	Chan Kin Ngai; Kazuhiro Shimogami	15; 1	15; 0
2	(Hong Kong) (Japan)	Chan Siu Kwong / Ng Pak Kum; Fumihiko Machida / Koji Miya	1; 15	7; 15
3	(Hong Kong) (Japan)	Wong Wai Lap; Hideaki Motoyama	15; 2	15; 8
4	(Hong Kong) (Japan)	Chan Kin Ngai / Chow Kin Man; Takuya Katayama / Seiichi Watanabe	15; 10	4; 15	15; 9
5	(Hong Kong) (Japan)	Ng Liang Hua; Fumihiko Machida	15; 9	15; 13

==== Group B ====
Pos	Team	Pld	W	L	MF	MA	MD	GF	GA	GD	Pts	Qualification
1	Indonesia	2	2	0	15	0	+15	30	0	+30	3	Knockout stage
2	Chinese Taipei	2	1	1	7	8	−1	15	18	−3	2	Knockout stage
3	South Korea	2	0	2	6	9	−3	14	20	−6	1	
4	Thailand	2	0	2	1	14	−13	6	27	−21	0	

South Korea
2
Queen Elizabeth Stadium
31 March 1993

Chinese Taipei
3

			1	2	3
1	(South Korea) (Chinese Taipei)	Park Sung-woo; Lee Mou-chou	15; 4	15; 1
2	(South Korea) (Chinese Taipei)	Ha Tae-kwon / Yoo Yong-sung; Horng Shin-jeng / Huang Chuan-chen	18; 17	11; 15	7; 15
3	(South Korea) (Chinese Taipei)	Lee Yong-sun; Lin Wei-chen	15; 8	15; 2
4	(South Korea) (Chinese Taipei)	Lee Suk-ho / Nam Chul-hwan; Ger Shin-ming / Yang Shih-jeng	15; 12	1; 15	4; 15
5	(South Korea) (Chinese Taipei)	Yoo Yong-sung; Liu En-hung	5; 15	10; 15

Indonesia
5
Queen Elizabeth Stadium
31 March 1993

Thailand
0

			1	2	3
1	(Indonesia) (Thailand)	Alan Budikusuma; Teeranun Chiangta	15; 4	18; 14
2	(Indonesia) (Thailand)	Rexy Mainaky / Ricky Subagja; Pramote Teerawiwatana / Sakrapee Thongsari	15; 0	15; 5
3	(Indonesia) (Thailand)	Ardy Wiranata; Thaweesak Koetsriphan	15; 3	15; 3
4	(Indonesia) (Thailand)	Imay Hendra / Bagus Setiadi; Monthon Bumphenkeitikul / Khunakorn Sudhisodhi	15; 6	15; 5
5	(Indonesia) (Thailand)	Hermawan Susanto; Kasemsak Chatujinda	15; 4	18; 13

South Korea
4
Queen Elizabeth Stadium
1 April 1993

Thailand
1

			1	2	3
1	(South Korea) (Thailand)	Park Sung-woo; Sompol Kukasemkij	15; 12	15; 5
2	(South Korea) (Thailand)	Ha Tae-kwon / Yoo Yong-sung; Pramote Teerawiwatana / Sakrapee Thongsari	7; 15	9; 15
3	(South Korea) (Thailand)	Lee Yong-sun; Teeranun Chiangta	15; 10	15; 6
4	(South Korea) (Thailand)	Kim Dong-moon / Lee Suk-ho; Kasemsak Chatujinda / Sompol Kukasemkij	17; 14	10; 15	15; 10
5	(South Korea) (Thailand)	Nam Chul-hwan; Thaweesak Koetsriphan	15; 11	7; 15	15; 8

Indonesia
5
Queen Elizabeth Stadium
1 April 1993

Chinese Taipei
0

			1	2	3
1	(Indonesia) (Chinese Taipei)	Hariyanto Arbi; Lin Wei-chen	15; 4	15; 6
2	(Indonesia) (Chinese Taipei)	Rexy Mainaky / Ricky Subagja; Horng Shin-jeng / Huang Chuan-chen	15; 0	15; 3
3	(Indonesia) (Chinese Taipei)	Alan Budikusuma; Liu En-hung	18; 13	15; 5
4	(Indonesia) (Chinese Taipei)	Imay Hendra / Hermawan Susanto; Chang Jeng-shyuang / Lee Mou-chou	15; 6	15; 1
5	(Indonesia) (Chinese Taipei)	Ardy Wiranata; Chang Jeng-shyuang	15; 4	15; 5

Thailand
1
Queen Elizabeth Stadium
2 April 1993

Chinese Taipei
4

			1	2	3
1	(Thailand) (Chinese Taipei)	Sompol Kukasemkij; Lee Mou-chou	7; 15	15; 5	15; 3
2	(Thailand) (Chinese Taipei)	Pramote Teerawiwatana / Sakrapee Thongsari; Ger Shin-ming / Yang Shih-jeng	9; 15	13; 15
3	(Thailand) (Chinese Taipei)	Teeranun Chiangta; Lin Wei-chen	14; 17	12; 15
4	(Thailand) (Chinese Taipei)	Kasemsak Chatujinda / Sompol Kukasemkij; Horng Shin-jeng / Huang Chuan-chen	7; 15	5; 15
5	(Thailand) (Chinese Taipei)	Thaweesak Koetsriphan; Liu En-hung	9; 15	10; 15

Indonesia
5
Queen Elizabeth Stadium
2 April 1993

South Korea
0

			1	2	3
1	(Indonesia) (South Korea)	Hariyanto Arbi; Park Sung-woo	15; 7	15; 6
2	(Indonesia) (South Korea)	Rexy Mainaky / Ricky Subagja; Lee Suk-ho / Yoo Yong-sung	15; 0	15; 3
3	(Indonesia) (South Korea)	Alan Budikusuma; Lee Yong-sun	15; 8	15; 6
4	(Indonesia) (South Korea)	Imay Hendra / Hermawan Susanto; Kim Dong-moon / Nam Chul-hwan	15; 11	15; 8
5	(Indonesia) (South Korea)	Ardy Wiranata; Ha Tae-kwon	15; 7	15; 3

=== Knockout stage ===
==== Bracket ====
Semi-finals
China	4
Chinese Taipei	1
Malaysia	2
Indonesia	3

Final
China	2
Indonesia	3

==== Semi-finals ====
Malaysia
2
Queen Elizabeth Stadium
3 April 1993

Indonesia
3

			1	2	3
1	(Malaysia) (Indonesia)	Foo Kok Keong; Heryanto Arbi	6; 15	15; 18
2	(Malaysia) (Indonesia)	Soo Beng Kiang / Cheah Soon Kit; Rexy Mainaky / Ricky Subagja	6; 15	10; 15
3	(Malaysia) (Indonesia)	Yong Hock Kin; Ardy Wiranata	12; 15	4; 15
4	(Malaysia) (Indonesia)	Yap Yee Guan / Yap Yee Hup; Imay Hendra / Bagus Setiadi
5	(Malaysia) (Indonesia)	Ong Ewe Hock; Hermawan Susanto	5; 15	15; 11	15; 10

China
4
Queen Elizabeth Stadium
3 April 1993

Chinese Taipei
1

			1	2	3
1	(China) (Chinese Taipei)	Wu Wenkai; Lee Mou-chou	15; 8	15; 6
2	(China) (Chinese Taipei)	Zheng Yumin / Huang Zhanzhong; Ger Shin-ming / Yang Shih-jeng	15; 9	17; 18	15; 4
3	(China) (Chinese Taipei)	Liu Jun; Liu En-hung	15; 8	15; 6
4	(China) (Chinese Taipei)	Wan Zhengwen; Chang Jeng-shyuang	17; 15	15; 4
5	(China) (Chinese Taipei)	Liu Jun / Chen Kang; Horng Shin-jeng / Huang Chuan-chen	11; 15	5; 15

==== Final Round ====
The championship winner was the team from Indonesia, ahead of China. In the final on April 4, 1993, the 25-year-old Chinese player Zheng Yumin collapsed in the fourth of five matches of the team fight when Indonesians were leading 2–0. He had to be given mouth-to-mouth breathing assistance and chest compressions before he was rushed to Hospital. Indonesia gave walkover for the last match and won by 3–2.

China
2
Queen Elizabeth Stadium
4 April 1993

Indonesia
3

			1	2	3
1	(China) (Indonesia)	Wu Wenkai; Heryanto Arbi	3; 15	8; 15
2	(China) (Indonesia)	Chen Hongyong / Chen Kang; Rexy Mainaky / Ricky Subagja	15; 12	18; 13
3	(China) (Indonesia)	Liu Jun; Alan Budikusuma	6; 15	18; 17	4; 15
4	(China) (Indonesia)	Huang Zhanzhong / Zheng Yumin; Imay Hendra / Hermawan Susanto	0; 2
5	(China) (Indonesia)	Wang Zhengwen; Ardy Wiranata

== Division 2 ==
=== Bracket ===
First round
Brunei	0
Philippines	5
Macau	5
Syria	0

Quarter-finals
Sri Lanka	4
Nepal	1
Philippines	0
Singapore	5
Pakistan	4
Macau	1
Bangladesh	0
India	5

Semi-finals
Sri Lanka	0
Singapore	5
Pakistan	0
India	5

Final
Singapore	0
India	5

=== Final ===
India
5
Queen Elizabeth Stadium
4 April 1993

Singapore
0

			1	2	3
1	(India) (Singapore)	Rajeev Bagga; Hamid Khan	15; 11	15; 5
2	(India) (Singapore)	Praveen Kumar; You Kok Kiong	8; 15	15; 9	15; 8
3	(India) (Singapore)	Ajay Kanwar / Vijaydeep Singh; Hamid Khan / Lim Boon Leng	17; 16	15; 7
4	(India) (Singapore)	Rajeev Bagga / Praveen Kumar; Patrick Lau / Lim Hong Han	10; 10	18; 15	15; 8
5	(India) (Singapore)	George Thomas; Tan Sian Peng	15; 9	4; 15	15; 8

== Sources ==
- "Indonesia Juara Dengan Kejutan". Kompas (in Indonesian). 5 April 1993. p. 1.
