= Thomas Lund (badminton) =

Danish badminton player (born 1968)

Personal information
- Born: Thomas Haubro Lund; 2 August 1968 (age 58) Aarhus, Midtjylland, Denmark
- Height: 1.88 m (6 ft 2 in)
- Weight: 74 kg (163 lb)

Sport
- Country: Denmark
- Sport: Badminton
- Handedness: Right

Men's & mixed doubles
- Highest ranking: 1 (XD with Pernille Dupont, also with Marlene Thomsen & also with Catrine Bengtsson)
- BWF profile
Medal record
Men's badminton
Representing Denmark
World Championships
Gold medal – first place	1993 Birmingham	Mixed doubles
Gold medal – first place	1995 Lausanne	Mixed doubles
Silver medal – second place	1991 Copenhagen	Men's doubles
Silver medal – second place	1995 Lausanne	Men's doubles
Silver medal – second place	1991 Copenhagen	Mixed doubles
World Cup
Gold medal – first place	1994 Ho Chi Minh	Mixed doubles
Silver medal – second place	1991 Macau	Mixed doubles
Bronze medal – third place	1994 Ho Chi Minh	Men's doubles
Sudirman Cup
Bronze medal – third place	1991 Copenhagen	Mixed team
Bronze medal – third place	1993 Birmingham	Mixed team
Thomas Cup
Silver medal – second place	1996 Hong Kong	Men's team
European Championships
Gold medal – first place	1992 Glasgow	Men's Doubles
Gold medal – first place	1996 Herning	Men's Doubles
Gold medal – first place	1992 Glasgow	Mixed Doubles
Silver medal – second place	1990 Moscow	Men's doubles
European Mixed Team Championships
Gold medal – first place	1990 Moscow	Mixed team
Gold medal – first place	1996 Herning	Mixed team
Silver medal – second place	1992 Glasgow	Mixed team

Thomas Haubro Lund (born 2 August 1968) is a retired badminton player from Denmark who affiliate with Kastrup Magleby club.

== Career ==
Lund was one of the world's leading doubles specialists of the 1990s, particularly in mixed doubles. He was a silver medalist in both men's and mixed doubles at the 1991 IBF World Championships. In 1993 and 1995 he won consecutive gold medals in mixed doubles at the IBF World Championships, the first with Sweden's Catrine Bengtsson and the second with his compatriot Marlene Thomsen. From 1990 through 1994 Lund won five consecutive mixed doubles titles with three different partners at the now defunct World Badminton Grand Prix. At the prestigious All England Open he captured titles in both men's doubles (1993) and mixed doubles (1992, 1995). Lund was elected to the World Badminton Hall of Fame in 2008.

=== Summer Olympics ===
Lund competed in badminton at the 1992 Summer Olympics in men's doubles with Jon Holst-Christensen. In the first round they defeated Dean Galt and Kerrin Harrison of New Zealand and in second round they were beaten by Razif Sidek and Jalani Sidek of Malaysia.

He also competed in badminton at the 1996 Summer Olympics in men's doubles with the same partner. They had a bye in the first round and lost against Ha Tae-kwon and Kang Kyung-jin of Korea in the second round.

== Major achievements ==
=== World Championships ===
Men's doubles
Year	Venue	Partner	Opponent	Score	Result
1991	Brøndby Arena, Copenhagen, Denmark	(Denmark) Jon Holst-Christensen	(South Korea) Kim Moon-soo (South Korea) Park Joo-bong	10–15, 15–12, 16–17	Silver
1995	Malley Sports Centre, Lausanne, Switzerland	(Denmark) Jon Holst-Christensen	(Indonesia) Rexy Mainaky (Indonesia) Ricky Subagja	5–15, 2–15	Silver

Mixed doubles
Year	Venue	Partner	Opponent	Score	Result
1991	Brøndby Arena, Copenhagen, Denmark	(Denmark) Pernille Dupont	(South Korea) Park Joo-bong (South Korea) Chung Myung-hee	5–15, 17–15, 9–15	Silver
1993	National Indoor Arena, Birmingham, England	(Sweden) Catrine Bengtsson	(Denmark) Jon Holst-Christensen (Denmark) Grete Mogensen	10–15, 15–6, 15–12	Gold
1995	Malley Sports Centre, Lausanne, Switzerland	(Denmark) Marlene Thomsen	(Denmark) Jens Eriksen (Denmark) Helene Kirkegaard	15–6, 15–2	Gold

=== World Cup ===
Men's doubles
Year	Venue	Partner	Opponent	Score	Result
1994	Phan Dinh Phung Indoor Stadium, Ho Chi Minh City, Vietnam	(Denmark) Michael Søgaard	(Indonesia) Rudy Gunawan (Indonesia) Bambang Suprianto	2–15, 10–15	Bronze

Mixed doubles
Year	Venue	Partner	Opponent	Score	Result
1991	Macau Forum, Macau	(Denmark) Pernille Dupont	(Indonesia) Rudy Gunawan (Indonesia) Rosiana Tendean	10–15, 9–15	Silver
1994	Phan Dinh Phung Indoor Stadium, Ho Chi Minh City, Vietnam	(Sweden) Catrine Bengtsson	(China) Chen Xingdong (China) Gu Jun	10–15, 15–10, 15–2	Gold

=== European Championships ===
Men's doubles
Year	Venue	Partner	Opponent	Score	Result
1990	Luzhniki; Moscow, Soviet Union	(Denmark) Max Gandrup	(Denmark) Jan Paulsen (Denmark) Henrik Svarrer	16–17, 6–15	Silver
1992	Kelvin Hall; Glasgow, Scotland	(Denmark) Jon Holst-Christensen	(Denmark) Jan Paulsen (Denmark) Henrik Svarrer	15–9, 15–5	Gold
1996	Herning Badminton Klub; Herning, Denmark	(Denmark) Jon Holst-Christensen	(Denmark) Michael Sogaard (Denmark) Henrik Svarrer	10–15, 15–12, 18–17	Gold

Mixed doubles
Year	Venue	Partner	Opponent	Score	Result
1992	Kelvin Hall; Glasgow, Scotland	(Denmark) Pernille Dupont	(Denmark) Jon Holst-Christensen (Denmark) Grete Mogensen	15–4, 9–15, 15–12	Gold

=== IBF World Grand Prix (58 titles, 19 runner-ups) ===
The World Badminton Grand Prix sanctioned by International Badminton Federation (IBF) from 1983 to 2006.

Men's doubles
Year	Tournament	Partner	Opponent	Score	Result
1989	Scottish Open	(Denmark) Max Gandrup	(Denmark) Mark Christiansen (Denmark) Michael Kjeldsen	15–7, 6–15, 15–10	(gold) Winner
1989	German Open	(Denmark) Max Gandrup	(Denmark) Jan Paulsen (Denmark) Henrik Svarrer	12–15, 15–8, 9–15	(silver) Runner-up
1990	Chinese Taipei Open	(Denmark) Max Gandrup	(Denmark) Mark Christiansen (Denmark) Michael Kjeldsen	9–15, 17–16, 7–15	(silver) Runner-up
1990	Dutch Open	(Denmark) Jon Holst-Christensen	(Indonesia) Bagus Setiadi (Indonesia) Ricky Subagja	15–10, 15–4	(gold) Winner
1990	Finnish Open	(Denmark) Max Gandrup	(Indonesia) Imay Hendra (Indonesia) Bagus Setiadi	17–18, 18–14, 9–15	(silver) Runner-up
1991	Swedish Open	(Denmark) Jon Holst-Christensen	(Malaysia) Cheah Soon Kit (Malaysia) Soo Beng Kiang	14–18, 7–15	(silver) Runner-up
1991	Scottish Open	(Denmark) Jon Holst-Christensen	(Sweden) Peter Axelsson (Sweden) Par-Gunnar Jonsson	18–15, 15–11	(gold) Winner
1991	German Open	(Denmark) Jon Holst-Christensen	(Indonesia) Eddy Hartono (Indonesia) Rudy Gunawan	9–15, 11–15	(silver) Runner-up
1992	U.S. Open	(Sweden) Jens Olsson	(Malaysia) Cheah Soon Kit (Malaysia) Soo Beng Kiang	9–15, 11–15	(silver) Runner-up
1992	German Open	(Denmark) Jon Holst-Christensen	(Indonesia) Rudy Gunawan (Indonesia) Bambang Suprianto	15–6, 2–15, 15–9	(gold) Winner
1992	Denmark Open	(Denmark) Jon Holst-Christensen	(Denmark) Jan Paulsen (Denmark) Henrik Svarrer	18–16, 15–8	(gold) Winner
1993	Korea Open	(Denmark) Jon Holst-Christensen	(China) Huang Zhanzhong (China) Zheng Yumin	15–5, 10–15, 8–15	(silver) Runner-up
1993	Scottish Open	(Denmark) Jon Holst-Christensen	(Russia) Sergey Melnikov (Russia) Nikolai Zuyev	15–4, 15–7	(gold) Winner
1993	All England Open	(Denmark) Jon Holst-Christensen	(China) Chen Hongyong (China) Chen Kang	10–15, 15–2, 15–10	(gold) Winner
1993	Canada Open	(Denmark) Jon Holst-Christensen	(China) Chen Hongyong (China) Chen Kang	15–7, 7–15, 15–4	(gold) Winner
1993	U.S. Open	(Denmark) Jon Holst-Christensen	(Indonesia) Antonius Ariantho (Indonesia) Denny Kantono	15–7, 15–7	(gold) Winner
1993	German Open	(Denmark) Jon Holst-Christensen	(Indonesia) Rexy Mainaky (Indonesia) Ricky Subagja	17–14, 15–12	(gold) Winner
1993	Denmark Open	(Denmark) Jon Holst-Christensen	(Denmark) Jan Paulsen (Denmark) Jim Laugesen	15–5, 15–5	(gold) Winner
1994	Singapore Open	(Denmark) Jon Holst-Christensen	(Indonesia) Rexy Mainaky (Indonesia) Ricky Subagja	6–15, 8–15	(silver) Runner-up
1994	German Open	(Denmark) Jon Holst-Christensen	(Indonesia) Antonius Ariantho (Indonesia) Denny Kantono	15–6, 15–2	(gold) Winner
1994	Denmark Open	(Denmark) Jon Holst-Christensen	(Indonesia) Antonius Ariantho (Indonesia) Denny Kantono	8–15, 15–5, 9–15	(silver) Runner-up
1995	Korea Open	(Denmark) Jon Holst-Christensen	(Indonesia) Rexy Mainaky (Indonesia) Ricky Subagja	6–15, 15–11, 7–15	(silver) Runner-up
1995	Swiss Open	(Denmark) Jon Holst-Christensen	(England) Simon Archer (England) Chris Hunt	15–6, 15–7	(gold) Winner
1995	Russian Open	(Denmark) Jon Holst-Christensen	(Indonesia) Tony Gunawan (Indonesia) Rudy Wijaya	15–8, 11–15, 17–14	(gold) Winner
1995	China Open	(Denmark) Jon Holst-Christensen	(China) Huang Zhanzhong (China) Jiang Xin	8–15, 11–15	(silver) Runner-up
1995	German Open	(Denmark) Jon Holst-Christensen	(Indonesia) Ade Sutrisna (Indonesia) Candra Wijaya	15–8, 15–13	(gold) Winner
1995	Denmark Open	(Denmark) Jon Holst-Christensen	(Indonesia) Tony Gunawan (Indonesia) Rudy Wijaya	16–17, 15–5, 15–6	(gold) Winner
1996	Swiss Open	(Denmark) Jon Holst-Christensen	(Indonesia) Sigit Budiarto (Indonesia) Dicky Purwotsugiono	15–12, 18–13	(gold) Winner
1996	German Open	(Denmark) Jon Holst-Christensen	(Indonesia) Seng Kok Kiong (Indonesia) Victo Wibowo	15–11, 11–15, 15–3	(gold) Winner

Mixed doubles
Year	Tournament	Partner	Opponent	Score	Result
1987	Scottish Open	(Denmark) Gitte Paulsen	(Denmark) Max Gandrup (Denmark) Grete Mogensen	15–13, 9–15, 15–8	(gold) Winner
1987	Denmark Open	(Denmark) Pernille Dupont	(Denmark) Mark Christiansen (Sweden) Maria Bengtsson	12–15, 5–15	(silver) Runner-up
1989	Malaysia Open	(Denmark) Pernille Dupont	(South Korea) Park Joo-bong (South Korea) Chung So-young	7–15, 13–15	(silver) Runner-up
1989	World Grand Prix Finals	(Denmark) Pernille Dupont	(Indonesia) Eddy Hartono (Indonesia) Verawaty Fadjrin	15–12, 7–15, 6–15	(silver) Runner-up
1990	Chinese Taipei Open	(Denmark) Pernille Dupont	(Sweden) Jan-Eric Antonsson (Sweden) Maria Bengtsson	15–4, 4–15, 15–10	(gold) Winner
1990	Japan Open	(Denmark) Pernille Dupont	(South Korea) Park Joo-bong (South Korea) Chung Myung-hee	10–15, 12–15	(silver) Runner-up
1990	Finnish Open	(Denmark) Pernille Dupont	(Denmark) Jon Holst-Christensen (Denmark) Grete Mogensen	18–14, 13–15, 15–10	(gold) Winner
1990	Denmark Open	(Denmark) Pernille Dupont	(Denmark) Henrik Svarrer (Denmark) Marlene Thomsen	15–4, 15–10	(gold) Winner
1990	World Grand Prix Finals	(Denmark) Pernille Dupont	(Denmark) Jon Holst-Christensen (Denmark) Grete Mogensen	12–15, 15–9, 15–8	(gold) Winner
1991	Chinese Taipei Open	(Denmark) Pernille Dupont	(Sweden) Par-Gunnar Jonsson (Sweden) Maria Bengtsson	15–9, 10–15, 18–17	(gold) Winner
1991	Swedish Open	(Denmark) Pernille Dupont	(Sweden) Par-Gunnar Jonsson (Sweden) Maria Bengtsson	15–7, 15–8	(gold) Winner
1991	Scottish Open	(Denmark) Pernille Dupont	(Denmark) Jon Holst-Christensen (Denmark) Grete Mogensen	15–2, 9–15, 14–18	(silver) Runner-up
1991	All England Open	(Denmark) Pernille Dupont	(South Korea) Park Joo-bong (South Korea) Chung Myung-hee	10–15, 15–10, 4–15	(silver) Runner-up
1991	Malaysia Open	(Denmark) Pernille Dupont	(South Korea) Lee Sang-bok (South Korea) Chung So-young	11–15, 8–15	(silver) Runner-up
1991	Indonesia Open	(Denmark) Pernille Dupont	(Indonesia) Aryono Miranat (Indonesia) Eliza Nathanael	15–8, 15–12	(gold) Winner
1991	Singapore Open	(Denmark) Pernille Dupont	(Sweden) Par-Gunnar Jonsson (Sweden) Maria Bengtsson	15–8, 15–12	(gold) Winner
1991	German Open	(Denmark) Pernille Dupont	(Denmark) Jan Paulsen (England) Gillian Gowers	15–12, 17–14	(gold) Winner
1991	Denmark Open	(Denmark) Pernille Dupont	(Denmark) Jon Holst-Christensen (Denmark) Grete Mogensen	15–7, 6–15, 15–7	(gold) Winner
1991	World Grand Prix Finals	(Denmark) Pernille Dupont	(South Korea) Shon Jin-Hwan (South Korea) Gil Young-ah	11–15, 15–7, 15–9	(gold) Winner
1992	Japan Open	(Denmark) Pernille Dupont	(Denmark) Jon Holst-Christensen (Denmark) Grete Mogensen	15–5, 15–11	(gold) Winner
1992	Korea Open	(Denmark) Pernille Dupont	(South Korea) Lee Sang-bok (South Korea) Shim Eun-jung	15–11, 15–9	(gold) Winner
1992	All England Open	(Denmark) Pernille Dupont	(Denmark) Jon Holst-Christensen (Denmark) Grete Mogensen	15–10, 15–1	(gold) Winner
1992	Malaysia Open	(Denmark) Pernille Dupont	(Denmark) Jon Holst-Christensen (Denmark) Lotte Olsen	15–8, 15–12	(gold) Winner
1992	Canada Open	(Denmark) Pernille Dupont	(Hong Kong) Chan Siu Kwong (Hong Kong) Chung Hoi Yuk	15–7, 15–4	(gold) Winner
1992	U.S. Open	(Denmark) Pernille Dupont	(Sweden) Jan-Eric Antonsson (Denmark) Lotte Olsen	15–5, 15–10	(gold) Winner
1992	German Open	(Denmark) Pernille Dupont	(Sweden) Par-Gunnar Jonsson (Sweden) Maria Bengtsson	15–9, 15–12	(gold) Winner
1992	Denmark Open	(Denmark) Pernille Dupont	(Denmark) Jon Holst-Christensen (Denmark) Anne-Mette van Dijk	15–10, 15–9	(gold) Winner
1992	World Grand Prix Finals	(Denmark) Pernille Dupont	(Denmark) Jon Holst-Christensen (Denmark) Grete Mogensen	15–5, 15–2	(gold) Winner
1993	Japan Open	(Sweden) Catrine Bengtsson	(Denmark) Christian Jakobsen (Denmark) Marlene Thomsen	15–6, 15–6	(gold) Winner
1993	Korea Open	(Sweden) Catrine Bengtsson	(Denmark) Jon Holst-Christensen (Denmark) Anne Mette Bille	15–9, 12–15, 15–4	(gold) Winner
1993	Swedish Open	(Sweden) Catrine Bengtsson	(Sweden) Peter Axelsson (England) Gillian Gowers	15–4, 15–10	(gold) Winner
1993	Scottish Open	(Sweden) Catrine Bengtsson	(Denmark) Jon Holst-Christensen (Denmark) Pernille Nedergaard	15–2, 13–11	(gold) Winner
1993	All England Open	(Sweden) Catrine Bengtsson	(Denmark) Jon Holst-Christensen (Denmark) Grete Mogensen	1–8 retired	(silver) Runner-up
1993	Canada Open	(Sweden) Catrine Bengtsson	(Denmark) Christian Jakobsen (Denmark) Lotte Olsen	15–2, 15–9	(gold) Winner
1993	U.S. Open	(Sweden) Catrine Bengtsson	(Denmark) Michael Søgaard (England) Gillian Gowers	15–7, 15–7	(gold) Winner
1993	German Open	(Netherlands) Erica Van Den Heuvel	(Denmark) Michael Sogaard (England) Gillian Gowers	15–4, 15–12	(gold) Winner
1993	Denmark Open	(Sweden) Catrine Bengtsson	(Sweden) Jan-Eric Antonsson (Sweden) Astrid Crabo	15–4, 15–4	(gold) Winner
1993	World Grand Prix Finals	(Sweden) Catrine Bengtsson	(England) Nick Ponting (England) Gillian Clark	15–9, 15–7	(gold) Winner
1994	Singapore Open	(Denmark) Marlene Thomsen	(Denmark) Jon Holst-Christensen (Denmark) Rikke Olsen	15–4, 15–4	(gold) Winner
1994	German Open	(Denmark) Marlene Thomsen	(Sweden) Jan-Eric Antonsson (Sweden) Astrid Crabo	14–18, 15–7, 15–8	(gold) Winner
1994	Denmark Open	(Denmark) Marlene Thomsen	(England) Simon Archer (England) Julie Bradbury	15–8, 15–3	(gold) Winner
1994	Hong Kong Open	(Denmark) Marlene Thomsen	(South Korea) Ha Tae-kwon (South Korea) Shim Eun-jung	17–14, 15–12	(gold) Winner
1994	China Open	(Denmark) Marlene Thomsen	(Denmark) Michael Sogaard (England) Gillian Gowers	15–3, 15–8	(gold) Winner
1994	World Grand Prix Finals	(Denmark) Marlene Thomsen	(Sweden) Jan-Eric Antonsson (Sweden) Astrid Crabo	15–4, 15–9	(gold) Winner
1995	Korea Open	(Denmark) Marlene Thomsen	(China) Liu Jianjun (China) Ge Fei	15–4, 18–15	(gold) Winner
1995	Japan Open	(Denmark) Marlene Thomsen	(Indonesia) Tri Kusharjanto (Indonesia) Minarti Timur	15–4, 14–17, 15–10	(gold) Winner
1995	Swiss Open	(Denmark) Marlene Thomsen	(Denmark) Jon Holst-Christensen (Denmark) Rikke Olsen	15–11, 18–14	(gold) Winner
1995	All England Open	(Denmark) Marlene Thomsen	(Denmark) Jon Holst-Christensen (Denmark) Rikke Olsen	15–7, 15–7	(gold) Winner

=== IBF International (5 titles, 1 runner-up) ===
Men's doubles
Year	Tournament	Partner	Opponent	Score	Result
1986	Bulgarian International	(Denmark) Max Gandrup	(Denmark) Jon Holst-Christensen (Denmark) Peter Jensen	15–3, 15–12	(gold) Winner
1987	Stockholm International	(Denmark) Max Gandrup	(Soviet Union) Andrey Antropov (Soviet Union) Vitali Shmakov	15–6, 18–14	(gold) Winner
1990	Nordic Championships	(Denmark) Jon Holst-Christensen	(Denmark) Max Gandrup (Denmark) Thomas Stuer-Lauridsen	13–18, 15–8, 10–15	(silver) Runner-up
1993	Hamburg Cup	(Denmark) Jon Holst-Christensen	(England) Simon Archer (England) Chris Hunt	15–8, 15–11	(gold) Winner

Mixed doubles
Year	Tournament	Partner	Opponent	Score	Result
1990	Nordic Championships	(Denmark) Pernille Dupont	(Denmark) Jon Holst-Christensen (Denmark) Grete Mogensen	15–8, 15–12	(gold) Winner
1994	Hamburg Cup	(Denmark) Marlene Thomsen	(Denmark) Christian Jakobsen (Denmark) Lotte Olsen	15–8, 15–6	(gold) Winner

=== Invitation Event (3 titles) ===
Men's doubles
Year	Tournament	Partner	Opponent	Score	Result
1993	Copenhagen Masters	(Denmark) Jon Holst-Christensen	(Denmark) Jim Laugesen (Denmark) Henrik Svarrer	15–3, 15–3	(gold) Winner
1994	Copenhagen Masters	(Denmark) Jon Holst-Christensen	(Denmark) Michael Sogaard (Denmark) Henrik Svarrer	15–10, 15–7	(gold) Winner
1996	Copenhagen Masters	(Denmark) Jon Holst-Christensen	(South Korea) Lee Dong-soo (South Korea) Yoo Yong-sung	17–15, 15–10	(gold) Winner
