= 1993 World Badminton Grand Prix Finals =

Tournament details
- Dates: 15–19 December
- Edition: 11
- Total prize money: US$125,000
- Location: Kuala Lumpur, Malaysia

The 1993 World Badminton Grand Prix was the 11th edition of the World Badminton Grand Prix finals. It was held in Kuala Lumpur, Malaysia, from December 15 to December 19, 1993.

== Final results ==
Category	Winners	Runners-up	Score
Men's Singles	(Indonesia) Joko Suprianto	(Indonesia) Hariyanto Arbi	11–15, 15–2, 15–1
Women's singles	(Indonesia) Susi Susanti	(China) Ye Zhaoying	11–3, 12–9
Men's doubles	(Indonesia) Rudy Gunawan & Bambang Suprianto	(Indonesia) Ricky Subagja & Rexy Mainaky	11–15, 15–10, 15–9
Women's doubles	(Indonesia) Finarsih & Lili Tampi	(Indonesia) Eliza Nathanael & Rosiana Tendean	15–11, 15–10
Mixed doubles	(Denmark) Thomas Lund & (Sweden) Catrine Bengtsson	(England) Nick Ponting & Gillian Clark	15–9, 15–7
