= 1991 IBF World Championships =

Tournament details
- Dates: 2 May – 8 May
- Edition: 7th
- Level: International
- Venue: Brøndby Arena
- Location: Copenhagen, Denmark

The 1991 IBF World Championships (World Badminton Championships) were held in Copenhagen, Denmark, in 1991.

== Host city selection ==
Copenhagen and Hong Kong submitted bids to host the championships.

== Venue ==
- Brøndby Arena

== Medalists ==
=== Medal table ===
* Host nation (Denmark)

Rank	Nation	Gold	Silver	Bronze	Total
1	China	3	0	2	5
2	South Korea	2	0	4	6
3	Indonesia	0	2	3	5
4	Denmark*	0	2	1	3
5	Sweden	0	1	0	1
Totals (5 entries)		5	5	10	20

=== Medalists ===
Event	Gold	Silver	Bronze
Men's Singles	(China) Zhao Jianhua	(Indonesia) Alan Budikusuma	(Indonesia) Ardy Wiranata
Men's Singles	(China) Zhao Jianhua	(Indonesia) Alan Budikusuma	(China) Liu Jun
Women's Singles	(China) Tang Jiuhong	(Indonesia) Sarwendah Kusumawardhani	(Indonesia) Susi Susanti
Women's Singles	(China) Tang Jiuhong	(Indonesia) Sarwendah Kusumawardhani	(South Korea) Lee Heung-soon
Men's Doubles	(South Korea) Park Joo-bong (South Korea) Kim Moon-soo	(Denmark) Jon Holst-Christensen (Denmark) Thomas Lund	(China) Li Yongbo (China) Tian Bingyi
Men's Doubles	(South Korea) Park Joo-bong (South Korea) Kim Moon-soo	(Denmark) Jon Holst-Christensen (Denmark) Thomas Lund	(Indonesia) Bagus Setiadi (Indonesia) Imay Hendra
Women's Doubles	(China) Guan Weizhen (China) Nong Qunhua	(Sweden) Christine Magnusson (Sweden) Maria Bengtsson	(South Korea) Shim Eun-jung (South Korea) Gil Young-ah
Women's Doubles	(China) Guan Weizhen (China) Nong Qunhua	(Sweden) Christine Magnusson (Sweden) Maria Bengtsson	(South Korea) Hwang Hye-young (South Korea) Chung So-young
Mixed Doubles	(South Korea) Park Joo-bong (South Korea) Chung Myung-hee	(Denmark) Thomas Lund (Denmark) Pernille Dupont	(Denmark) Jon Holst-Christensen (Denmark) Grete Mogensen
Mixed Doubles	(South Korea) Park Joo-bong (South Korea) Chung Myung-hee	(Denmark) Thomas Lund (Denmark) Pernille Dupont	(South Korea) Kang Kyung-jin (South Korea) Shim Eun-jung
