= Peter Axelsson =

Swedish badminton player (born 1967)

Personal information
- Full name: Hans Peter Christian Axelsson
- Born: 22 June 1967 (age 59) Täby, Sweden
- Height: 1.89 m (6 ft 2 in)

Sport
- Country: Sweden
- Sport: Badminton
- Handedness: Right
- Event: Men's doubles

Men's doubles
- BWF profile
Medal record
Men's badminton
Representing Sweden
World Championships
Bronze medal – third place	1993 Birmingham	Men's doubles
World Cup
Gold medal – first place	1993 New Delhi	Mixed doubles
Bronze medal – third place	1993 New Delhi	Men's doubles
European Championships
Silver medal – second place	1998 Sofia	Men's Doubles
Silver medal – second place	2000 Glasgow	Men's Doubles
Bronze medal – third place	1988 Kristiansand	Men's Doubles
Bronze medal – third place	1990 Moscow	Men's Doubles
Bronze medal – third place	1992 Glasgow	Men's Doubles
Bronze medal – third place	1996 Herning	Men's Doubles
European Mixed Team Championships
Gold medal – first place	1992 Glasgow	Mixed team
Silver medal – second place	1988 Kristiansand	Mixed team
Silver medal – second place	1990 Moscow	Mixed team
Silver medal – second place	1996 Herning	Mixed team
Bronze medal – third place	1998 Sofia	Mixed team
European Junior Championships
Bronze medal – third place	1985 Pressbaum	Boys' doubles
Bronze medal – third place	1985 Pressbaum	Mixed team

Hans Peter Christian Axelsson (born 22 June 1967) is a retired badminton player from Sweden.

== Career ==
He won the bronze medal at the 1993 IBF World Championships in men's doubles with Pär-Gunnar Jönsson.

== Achievements ==
=== World Championships ===
Men's doubles
Year	Venue	Partner	Opponent	Score	Result
1993	National Indoor Arena; Birmingham, England	(Sweden) Pär-Gunnar Jönsson	(Indonesia) Rudy Gunawan (Indonesia) Ricky Subagja	9–15, 15–11, 4–15	Bronze

=== World Cup ===
Men's doubles
Year	Venue	Partner	Opponent	Score	Result
1993	Indira Gandhi Arena; New Delhi, India	(Sweden) Pär-Gunnar Jönsson	(China) Chen Hongyong (China) Chen Kang	9–15, 5–15	Bronze

Mixed doubles
Year	Venue	Partner	Opponent	Score	Result
1993	Indira Gandhi Arena; New Delhi, India	(England) Gillian Gowers	(Indonesia) Aryono Miranat (Indonesia) Eliza Nathanael	10–15, 15–7, 15–5	Gold

=== European Championships ===
Men's doubles
Year	Venue	Partner	Opponent	Score	Result
1988	Badmintonsenteret; Kristiansand, Norway	(Sweden) Stefan Karlsson	(Denmark) Jan Paulsen (Denmark) Steen Fladberg	10–15, 15–7, 10–15	Bronze
1990	Luzhniki Small Sports Arena; Moscow, Soviet Union	(Sweden) Mikael Rosén	(Denmark) Max Gandrup (Denmark) Thomas Lund	10–15, 15–6, 6–15	Bronze
1992	Glasgow, Scotland	(Sweden) Pär-Gunnar Jönsson	(Denmark) Jon Holst Christensen (Denmark) Thomas Lund	15–18, 15–10, 5–15	Bronze
1996	Herning Badminton Klub; Herning, Denmark	(Sweden) Pär-Gunnar Jönsson	(Denmark) Henrik Svarrer (Denmark) Michael Sogaard	8–15, 6–15	Bronze
1998	Winter Sports Palace; Sofia, Bulgaria	(Sweden) Pär-Gunnar Jönsson	(England) Simon Archer (England) Chris Hunt	3–15, 3–15	Silver
2000	Kelvin Hall International Sports Arena; Glasgow, Scotland	(Sweden) Pär-Gunnar Jönsson	(Denmark) Jens Eriksen (Denmark) Jesper Larsen	7–15, 6–15	Silver

=== European Junior Championships ===
Girls' doubles
Year	Venue	Partner	Opponent	Score	Result
1985	Sacré Coeur Cloister Hall; Pressbaum, Austria	(Sweden) Mikael Lunqvist	(Denmark) Johnny Børglum (Denmark) Max Gandrup	6–15, 7–15	Bronze

=== IBF World Grand Prix ===
The World Badminton Grand Prix sanctioned by International Badminton Federation (IBF) from 1983 to 2006.

Men's doubles
Year	Tournament	Partner	Opponent	Score	Result
1990	Scottish Open	(Sweden) Pär-Gunnar Jönsson	(Denmark) Mark Christiansen (Denmark) Michael Kjeldsen	13–15, 15–10, 15–11	(gold) Winner
1991	Scottish Open	(Sweden) Pär-Gunnar Jönsson	(Denmark) Thomas Lund (Denmark) Jon Holst-Christensen	15–18, 11–15	(silver) Runner-up
1992	Swedish Open	(Sweden) Pär-Gunnar Jönsson	(China) Chen Hongyong (China) Chen Kang	12–15, 4–15	(silver) Runner-Up
1992	Finnish Open	(Sweden) Pär-Gunnar Jönsson	(Indonesia) Rudi Gunawan Haditono (Indonesia) Dick Purwotjugiono	15–8, 15–5	(gold) Winner
1992	Scottish Open	(Sweden) Pär-Gunnar Jönsson	(Denmark) Jon Holst-Christensen (Denmark) Christian Jakobsen	15–10, 15–11	(gold) Winner
1993	Swiss Open	(Sweden) Pär-Gunnar Jönsson	(Sweden) Stellan Österberg (Denmark) Max Gandrup	15–4, 15–4	(gold) Winner
1993	Swedish Open	(Sweden) Pär-Gunnar Jönsson	(Indonesia) Rexy Mainaky (Indonesia) Ricky Subagja	12–15, 10–15	(silver) Runner-up
1994	Korea Open	(Sweden) Pär-Gunnar Jönsson	(Indonesia) Denny Kantono (Indonesia) Ricky Subagja	17–14, 15–7	(gold) Winner
1994	Swiss Open	(Sweden) Pär-Gunnar Jönsson	(Malaysia) Tan Kim Her (Malaysia) Yap Kim Hock	15–7, 15–8	(gold) Winner
1994	Swedish Open	(Sweden) Pär-Gunnar Jönsson	(Indonesia) Rexy Mainaky (Indonesia) Ricky Subagja	11–15, 12–15	(silver) Runner-up
1995	Swedish Open	(Sweden) Pär-Gunnar Jönsson	(South Korea) Kang Kyung-jin (South Korea) Kim Dong-moon	15–5, 15–9	(gold) Winner
1996	Chinese Taipei Open	(Sweden) Pär-Gunnar Jönsson	(Indonesia) Denny Kantono (Indonesia) Antonius Ariantho	6–15, 7–15	(silver) Runner-up
1997	Swedish Open	(Sweden) Pär-Gunnar Jönsson	(South Korea) Ha Tae-kwon (South Korea) Kang Kyung-jin	3–15, 11–15	(silver) Runner-up
1998	Dutch Open	(Sweden) Pär-Gunnar Jönsson	(Malaysia) Cheah Soon Kit (Malaysia) Choong Tan Fook	11–15, 9–15	(silver) Runner-up
1999	German Open	(Sweden) Pär-Gunnar Jönsson	(Malaysia) Lee Wan Wah (Malaysia) Choong Tan Fook	9–15, 6–15	(silver) Runner-up

Mixed doubles
Year	Tournament	Partner	Opponent	Score	Result
1993	Swedish Open	(England) Gillian Gowers	(Denmark) Thomas Lund (Sweden) Catrine Bengtsson	4–15, 10–15	(silver) Runner-up
1994	Chinese Taipei Open	(Denmark) Marlene Thomsen	(Denmark) Michael Sogaard (England) Gillian Gowers	14–18, 10–15	(silver) Runner-up
1994	Korea Open	(Denmark) Marlene Thomsen	(Denmark) Michael Sogaard (England) Gillian Gowers	12–15, 9–15	(silver) Runner-up
1994	Swiss Open	(Denmark) Marlene Thomsen	(Denmark) Jon Holst-Christensen (Sweden) Catrine Bengtsson	18–13, 15–9	(gold) Winner
1996	Dutch Open	(Sweden) Catrine Bengtsson	(Sweden) Jan-Eric Antonsson (Sweden) Astrid Crabo	0–9, 7–9, 6–9	(silver) Runner-up

=== IBF International ===
Men's doubles
Year	Tournament	Partner	Opponent	Score	Result
1992	Nordic Championships	(Sweden) Pär-Gunnar Jönsson	(Denmark) Jon Holst-Christensen (Denmark) Jan Paulsen	15–18, 11–15	(silver) Runner-up
1999	Welsh International	(Sweden) Joakim Andersson	(Netherlands) Tijs Creemers (Netherlands) Robert Frenk	15–4, 15–9	(gold) Winner
2000	Norwegian International	(Sweden) Immanuel Hirschfeldt	(Sweden) Joakim Andersson (Sweden) Johan Holm	17–14, 6–15, 15–4	(gold) Winner
