= Imay Hendra =

Indonesian badminton player (born 1970)

Personal information
- Born: 30 January 1970 (age 56)
- Height: 1.70 m (5 ft 7 in)

Sport
- Country: Indonesia; Brunei; Switzerland
- Sport: Badminton
- Handedness: Right
- Event: Men's doubles

Men's doubles
- BWF profile
Medal record
Men's badminton
Representing Indonesia
World Championships
Bronze medal – third place	1991 Copenhagen	Men's doubles
Asian Championships
Gold medal – first place	1993 Hong Kong	Men's team
Silver medal – second place	1989 Shanghai	Men's team

Imay Hendra (born 30 January 1970) is an Indonesian former badminton player, who later represented Brunei after became Brunei national coach, and Switzerland. He won a men's doubles bronze medal at the 1991 IBF World Championships in Copenhagen with Bagus Setiadi. They won the Finnish Open together in 1990, also finished as semi-finalists at the All England and Indonesia Open in 1991. He was part of Indonesia winning team at the 1993 Asian Championships.

== Achievements ==
=== World Championships ===
Men's doubles
Year	Venue	Partner	Opponent	Score	Result
1991	Brøndby Arena; Copenhagen, Denmark	(Indonesia) Bagus Setiadi	(South Korea) Kim Moon-soo (South Korea) Park Joo-bong	2–15, 12–15	Bronze

=== World Junior Championships ===
The Bimantara World Junior Championships was an international invitation badminton tournament for junior players. It was held in Jakarta, Indonesia from 1987 to 1991.

Boys' doubles
Year	Venue	Partner	Opponent	Score	Result
1987	Jakarta, Indonesia	(Indonesia) Ricky Subagja	(South Korea) Ahn Jae-chang (South Korea) Choi Sang-bum	11–15, 14–17	Bronze

=== IBF World Grand Prix (1 title, 2 runners-up) ===
The World Badminton Grand Prix sanctioned by International Badminton Federation (IBF) since 1983.

Men's doubles
Year	Tournament	Partner	Opponent	Score	Result
1990	Finnish Open	(Indonesia) Bagus Setiadi	(Denmark) Max Gandrup (Denmark) Thomas Lund	18–17, 14–18, 15–9	(gold) Winner
1993	Chinese Taipei Open	(Indonesia) Bagus Setiadi	(Malaysia) Cheah Soon Kit (Malaysia) Soo Beng Kiang	3–15, 12–15	(silver) Runner-up
1993	Thailand Open	(Indonesia) Dicky Purwotjugiono	(Indonesia) Rudy Gunawan (Indonesia) Bambang Suprianto	5–15, 7–15	(silver) Runner-up

=== IBF International (2 titles, 2 runners-up) ===
Men's singles
Year	Tournament	Opponent	Score	Result
1996	La Chaux-de-Fonds International	(England) Colin Haughton	10–15, 12–15	(silver) Runner-up

Men's doubles
Year	Tournament	Partner	Opponent	Score	Result
1994	Hamburg Cup	(Indonesia) Dicky Purwotjugiono	(Indonesia) Antonius Ariantho (Indonesia) Dharma Gunawi	7–15, 15–12, 15–4	(gold) Winner
1994	Lausanne International	(England) Steve Bish	(England) James Anderson (England) Ian Pearson	11–15, 5–15	(silver) Runner-up
1995	Victor Cup	(Indonesia) Dharma Gunawi	(Germany) Michael Helber (Germany) Kai Mitteldorf	15–5, 15–8	(gold) Winner
