= Bernadette N. Setiadi =

Indonesian writer

Bernadette N. Setiadi (born 26 October 1948) is a social psychologist of Indonesia. She has written on the Indonesian family and other issues.
