= Bagus Setiadi =

Indonesian badminton player (born 1966)

Personal information
- Born: 24 June 1966 (age 60)
- Height: 1.70 m (5 ft 7 in)

Sport
- Country: Indonesia
- Sport: Badminton
- Handedness: Right

Men's doubles
- Highest ranking: 7
- BWF profile
Medal record
Men's badminton
Representing Indonesia
World Championships
Bronze medal – third place	1991 Copenhagen	Men's doubles
Asian Championships
Gold medal – first place	1993 Hong Kong	Men's team
Silver medal – second place	1989 Shanghai	Men's team

Bagus Setiadi (born 24 June 1966) is a retired male badminton player from Indonesia. Setiadi retired after one of his eyes was injured from a hit by the shuttlecock smashed by his sparring partner, Imay Hendra, during regular training in the 1990s.

== Career ==
He won the bronze medal at the 1991 IBF World Championships in men's doubles with Imay Hendra. They had won men's doubles together at the inaugural edition of Finnish Open in 1990. Setiadi was part of Indonesia national team at the 1992 Thomas Cup.

== Achievements ==
=== IBF World Championships ===
Men's Doubles

1991 IBF World Championships – Men's doubles
Round	Partner	Opponent	Score	Result
SF	(Indonesia) Imay Hendra	(South Korea) Park Joo-bong (South Korea) Kim Moon-soo	2–15, 12–15	Bronze

=== IBF World Grand Prix ===
The World Badminton Grand Prix sanctioned by International Badminton Federation (IBF) from 1983 to 2006.

Men's doubles
Year	Tournament	Partner	Opponent	Score	Result
1990	Finnish Open	(Indonesia) Imay Hendra	(Denmark) Max Gandrup (Denmark) Thomas Lund	18–17, 14–18, 15–9	(gold) Winner
1990	Dutch Open	(Indonesia) Ricky Subagja	(Denmark) Jon Holst-Christensen (Denmark) Thomas Lund	10–15, 4–15	(silver) Runner-up
1993	Chinese Taipei Open	(Indonesia) Imay Hendra	(Malaysia) Cheah Soon Kit (Malaysia) Soo Beng Kiang	3–15, 12–15	(silver) Runner-up

IBF Grand Prix tournament
IBF Grand Prix Finals tournament
