= Hermawan Susanto =

Indonesian badminton player (born 1967)

Personal information
- Born: 24 September 1967 (age 59) Kudus Regency, Central Java, Indonesia
- Height: 1.70 m (5 ft 7 in)
- Weight: 62 kg (137 lb)
- Spouse: Sarwendah Kusumawardhani (m. 1995)

Sport
- Country: Indonesia
- Sport: Badminton
- Handedness: Right
- Event: Men's singles

Men's singles
- BWF profile
Medal record
Men's badminton
Representing Indonesia
Olympic Games
| Bronze medal – third place | 1992 Barcelona | Men's singles |
World Championships
| Silver medal – second place | 1993 Birmingham | Men's singles |
World Cup
| Silver medal – second place | 1992 Guangzhou | Men's singles |
| Bronze medal – third place | 1993 New Delhi | Men's singles |
Thomas Cup
| Gold medal – first place | 1994 Jakarta | Men's team |
| Silver medal – second place | 1992 Kuala Lumpur | Men's team |
Asian Games
| Gold medal – first place | 1994 Hiroshima | Men's team |
| Bronze medal – third place | 1990 Beijing | Men's team |
Asian Championships
| Gold medal – first place | 1993 Hong Kong | Men's team |
| Silver medal – second place | 1989 Shanghai | Men's team |
| Bronze medal – third place | 1997 Kuala Lumpur | Men's singles |
Asian Cup
| Bronze medal – third place | 1995 Qingdao | Men's singles |

Hermawan Susanto (Chinese: 蔡祥林; born 24 September 1967) is a former Indonesian badminton player who played at the world level during the 1990s.

== Career ==
Susanto was one of an impressive cadre of Indonesians who won numerous international tournaments and captured successive Thomas Cup (men's world team) titles during the era. Susanto came close to winning two of badminton's three biggest events for individual players; he was a bronze medalist in men's singles at the 1992 Olympic Games in Barcelona, and was runner-up to fellow countryman Joko Suprianto at the (then biennial) World Championships in 1993.

Susanto's accomplishments included victories at the Dutch Open (1990, 1992), the Denmark Open (1992), the China Open (1992), the Chinese Taipei Open (1991, 1995), the Hong Kong Open (1993), the U.S. Open (1995), and the Malaysia Open (1997).

== Personal life ==
Susanto married another former Indonesian player, Sarwendah Kusumawardhani, in 1995. They have one child named Andrew Susanto, who is currently following his parents' footsteps in playing badminton.

== Achievements ==
=== Olympic Games ===
Men's singles
| Year | Venue | Opponent | Score | Result | Ref. |
|---|---|---|---|---|---|
| 1992 | Pavelló de la Mar Bella, Barcelona, Spain | (Indonesia) Ardy Wiranata | 15–10, 9–15, 9–15 | Bronze | |

=== World Championships ===
Men's singles
| Year | Venue | Opponent | Score | Result | Ref. |
|---|---|---|---|---|---|
| 1993 | National Indoor Arena, Birmingham, England | (Indonesia) Joko Suprianto | 5–15, 11–15 | Silver | |

=== World Cup ===
Men's singles
| Year | Venue | Opponent | Score | Result | Ref. |
|---|---|---|---|---|---|
| 1992 | Guangdong Gymnasium, Guangzhou, China | (Indonesia) Joko Suprianto | 13–18, 8–15 | Silver | |
| 1993 | Indira Gandhi Arena, New Delhi, India | (Indonesia) Alan Budikusuma | 11–15, 5–15 | Bronze | |

=== Asian Championships ===
Men's singles
| Year | Venue | Opponent | Score | Result | Ref. |
|---|---|---|---|---|---|
| 1997 | Stadium Negara, Kuala Lumpur, Malaysia | (China) Sun Jun | 4–15, 8–15 | Bronze | |

=== Asian Cup ===
Men's singles
| Year | Venue | Opponent | Score | Result | Ref. |
|---|---|---|---|---|---|
| 1995 | Xinxing Gymnasium, Qingdao, China | (China) Sun Jun | 15–1, 5–15, 14–17 | Bronze | |

=== IBF World Grand Prix (9 titles, 9 runners-up) ===
The World Badminton Grand Prix sanctioned by International Badminton Federation (IBF) from 1983 to 2006.

Men's singles
| Year | Tournament | Opponent | Score | Result | Ref. |
|---|---|---|---|---|---|
| 1987 | French Open | (Denmark) Ib Frederiksen | 2–15, 4–15 | (silver) Runner-up | |
| 1990 | Finnish Open | (Denmark) Morten Frost | 13–15, 15–4, 9–15 | (silver) Runner-up | |
| 1990 | Dutch Open | (Denmark) Poul-Erik Høyer Larsen | 15–10, 15–6 | (gold) Winner | |
| 1991 | Chinese Taipei Open | (Indonesia) Ardy Wiranata | 15–18, 15–10, 15–7 | (gold) Winner | |
| 1991 | Dutch Open | (Denmark) Poul-Erik Høyer Larsen | 17–18, 15–6, 10–15 | (silver) Runner-up | |
| 1991 | German Open | (Denmark) Poul-Erik Høyer Larsen | 8–15, 8–15 | (silver) Runner-up | |
| 1991 | Denmark Open | (Denmark) Poul-Erik Høyer Larsen | 8–15, 15–12, 15–8 | (gold) Winner | |
| 1992 | Chinese Taipei Open | (Indonesia) Ardy Wiranata | 15–8, 0–15, 7–15 | (silver) Runner-up | |
| 1992 | China Open | (China) Wu Wenkai | 18–13, 15–9 | (gold) Winner | |
| 1992 | Dutch Open | (Netherlands) Jeroen van Dijk | 15–6, 15–6 | (gold) Winner | |
| 1993 | Hong Kong Open | (Denmark) Thomas Stuer-Lauridsen | 15–7, 15–4 | (gold) Winner | |
| 1993 | Thailand Open | (Indonesia) Joko Suprianto | 11–15, 3–15 | (silver) Runner-up | |
| 1994 | Singapore Open | (Indonesia) Ardy Wiranata | 5–15, 8–15 | (silver) Runner-up | |
| 1994 | Korea Open | (Indonesia) Ardy Wiranata | 10–15, 15–4, 9–15 | (silver) Runner-up | |
| 1995 | Chinese Taipei Open | (South Korea) Lee Kwang-jin | 15–2, 18–13 | (gold) Winner | |
| 1995 | Singapore Open | (Indonesia) Joko Suprianto | 11–15, 15–3, 10–15 | (silver) Runner-up | |
| 1995 | U.S. Open | (China) Dong Jiong | 15–10, 15–3 | (gold) Winner | |
| 1997 | Malaysia Open | (Denmark) Peter Gade | 15–11, 15–11 | (gold) Winner | |

IBF Grand Prix tournament
IBF Grand Prix Finals tournament

=== IBF International (1 title, 1 runner-up) ===
Men's singles
| Year | Tournament | Opponent | Score | Result | Ref. |
|---|---|---|---|---|---|
| 1986 | Silver Bowl International | (Indonesia) Richard Mainaky | 17–14, 15–3 | (gold) Winner | |
| 1986 | Auckland International | (Indonesia) Edi Ismanto | 13–18, 15–9, 15–12 | (silver) Runner-up | |

=== IBF Junior International (1 title) ===
Boys' singles
| Year | Tournament | Opponent | Score | Result | Ref. |
|---|---|---|---|---|---|
| 1984 | Jakarta Junior Open | (Indonesia) Hargiono | 15–3, 15–5 | (gold) Winner | |
