= World Badminton Grand Prix Finals =

International badminton championships

The World Badminton Grand Prix Finals was an annual badminton tournament organized by the International Badminton Federation (IBF) to crown the best badminton player of the year. The tournament only invited the top eight players in the year-end world rankings. The tournament started in 1983, with the last tournament held in 2001 (delayed from 2000).

== Location ==
Year	No.	Host city	Country
1983	I	Jakarta	Indonesia
1984	II	Kuala Lumpur	Malaysia
1985	III	Tokyo	Japan
1986	IV	Kuala Lumpur	Malaysia
1987	V	Hong Kong	Hong Kong
1988	VI	Hong Kong	Hong Kong
1989	VII	Singapore	Singapore
1990	VIII	Denpasar	Indonesia

Year	No.	Host city	Country
1991	IX	Kuala Lumpur	Malaysia
1992	X	Kuala Lumpur	Malaysia
1993	XI	Kuala Lumpur	Malaysia
1994	XII	Bangkok	Thailand
1995	XIII	Singapore	Singapore
1996	XIV	Denpasar	Indonesia
1997	XV	Jakarta	Indonesia
1998	XVI	Bandar Seri Begawan	Brunei
1999	XVII	Bandar Seri Begawan	Brunei
2000	XVIII	Bandar Seri Begawan	Brunei

* Held in 2001.

== Past winners ==
Year	Men's singles	Women's singles	Men's doubles	Women's doubles	Mixed doubles
1983	(China) Luan Jin	(China) Li Lingwei	no competition		
1984	(Denmark) Morten Frost	(China) Han Aiping	no competition		
1985	(China) Han Jian	(China) Li Lingwei	no competition		
1986	(China) Yang Yang	(China) Li Lingwei	(Malaysia) Jalani Sidek (Malaysia) Razif Sidek	(South Korea) Hwang Hye-young (South Korea) Chung Myung-hee	(England) Nigel Tier (England) Gillian Gowers
1987	(China) Xiong Guobao	(China) Li Lingwei	(China) Li Yongbo (China) Tian Bingyi	(China) Guan Weizhen (China) Lin Ying	(Sweden) Stefan Karlsson (Sweden) Maria Bengtsson
1988	(China) Zhang Qingwu	(China) Han Aiping	(Malaysia) Jalani Sidek (Malaysia) Razif Sidek	(China) Guan Weizhen (China) Lin Ying	(China) Wang Pengren (China) Shi Fangjing
1989	(China) Xiong Guobao	(China) Tang Jiuhong	(Malaysia) Jalani Sidek (Malaysia) Razif Sidek	(Indonesia) Rosiana Tendean (Indonesia) Erma Sulistianingsih	(Indonesia) Eddy Hartono (Indonesia) Verawaty Fadjrin
1990	(Indonesia) Eddy Kurniawan	(Indonesia) Susi Susanti	(Indonesia) Eddy Hartono (Indonesia) Rudy Gunawan	(China) Lai Caiqin (China) Yao Fen	(Denmark) Thomas Lund (Denmark) Pernille Dupont
1991	(China) Zhao Jianhua	(Indonesia) Susi Susanti	(Malaysia) Jalani Sidek (Malaysia) Razif Sidek	(South Korea) Hwang Hye-young (South Korea) Chung Myung-hee	(Denmark) Thomas Lund (Denmark) Pernille Dupont
1992	(Malaysia) Rashid Sidek	(Indonesia) Susi Susanti	(Indonesia) Ricky Subagja (Indonesia) Rexy Mainaky	(China) Lin Yanfen (China) Yao Fen	(Denmark) Thomas Lund (Denmark) Pernille Dupont
1993	(Indonesia) Joko Suprianto	(Indonesia) Susi Susanti	(Indonesia) Rudy Gunawan (Indonesia) Bambang Suprianto	(Indonesia) Finarsih (Indonesia) Lili Tampi	(Denmark) Thomas Lund (Sweden) Catrine Bengtsson
1994	(Indonesia) Ardy Wiranata	(Indonesia) Susi Susanti	(Indonesia) Ricky Subagja (Indonesia) Rexy Mainaky	(China) Ge Fei (China) Gu Jun	(Denmark) Thomas Lund (Denmark) Marlene Thomsen
1995	(Indonesia) Joko Suprianto	(China) Ye Zhaoying	(Malaysia) Cheah Soon Kit (Malaysia) Yap Kim Hock	(China) Ge Fei (China) Gu Jun	(Indonesia) Trikus Heryanto (Indonesia) Minarti Timur
1996	(Chinese Taipei) Fung Permadi	(Indonesia) Susi Susanti	(Indonesia) Ricky Subagja (Indonesia) Rexy Mainaky	(China) Ge Fei (China) Gu Jun	(Denmark) Michael Søgaard (Denmark) Rikke Olsen
1997	(China) Sun Jun	(China) Ye Zhaoying	(Indonesia) Candra Wijaya (Indonesia) Sigit Budiarto	(China) Ge Fei (China) Gu Jun	(China) Liu Yong (China) Ge Fei
1998	(China) Sun Jun	(China) Zhang Ning	(Indonesia) Denny Kantono (Indonesia) Antonius Ariantho	(China) Ge Fei (China) Gu Jun	(South Korea) Kim Dong-moon (South Korea) Ra Kyung-min
1999	(Denmark) Peter Gade	(China) Ye Zhaoying	(Indonesia) Candra Wijaya (Indonesia) Tony Gunawan	(China) Ge Fei (China) Gu Jun	(South Korea) Kim Dong-moon (South Korea) Ra Kyung-min
2000	(China) Xia Xuanze	(China) Zhou Mi	(Indonesia) Candra Wijaya (Indonesia) Tony Gunawan	(China) Huang Nanyan (China) Yang Wei	(Denmark) Jens Eriksen (Denmark) Mette Schjoldager

== Performances by nation ==
Top Nations
Rank	Nation	MS	WS	MD	WD	XD	Total
1	China	10	12	1	10	2	35
2	Indonesia	4	6	9	3	2	24
3	Denmark	2	0	0	0	6.5	8.5
4	Malaysia	1	0	5	0	0	6
5	South Korea	0	0	0	2	2	4
6	Sweden	0	0	0	0	1.5	1.5
7	Chinese Taipei	1	0	0	0	0	1
7	England	0	0	0	0	1	1
	Total	18	18	15	15	15	81

== See also ==
- BWF Super Series Finals
- BWF World Tour Finals
