= Badminton at the 1989 SEA Games – Men's team =

Badminton – Men's team at the 1989 SEA Games
- Venue: Stadium Negara
- Dates: 24 – 26 August 1989
- Nations: 7

Medalists
gold medal	Malaysia (MAS)
silver medal	Indonesia (INA)
bronze medal	Thailand (THA)
bronze medal	Singapore (SIN)

The men's team badminton tournament at the 1989 SEA Games was held from 24 to 26 August 1989 at Stadium Negara.

== Schedule ==
All times are Malaysian Standard Time (UTC+08:00)

Date	Time	Event
Thursday, 24 August	19:30	First round
Friday, 25 August	19:30	Semi-finals
Saturday, 26 August	19:00	Gold medal match

== Bracket ==
1st round
Singapore (SIN)	3
Philippines (PHI)	2
Thailand (THA)	3
Myanmar (MYA)	0
Laos (LAO)	0
Indonesia (INA)	3

Semi-finals
Malaysia (MAS)	3
Singapore (SIN)	0
Thailand (THA)	0
Indonesia (INA)	3

Gold medal match
Malaysia (MAS)	3
Indonesia (INA)	0

== First round ==
=== Singapore vs Philippines ===
Singapore
3
Stadium Negara
24 August 1989, 19:30

Philippines
2

			1	2	3
1	(Singapore) (Philippines)	Abdul Hamid Khan; Anthony Ave	15; 8	15; 1
2	(Singapore) (Philippines)	Donald Koh; Antonio Mance Jr.	5; 15	16; 17
3	(Singapore) (Philippines)	Abdul Hamid Khan / Lau Wing Cheok; Anthony Ave / Salvador Banquiles	15; 10	15; 10
4	(Singapore) (Philippines)	John Lim / Benson Wong; Jessie Alonzo / Antonio Mance Jr.	8; 15	15; 9	12; 15
5	(Singapore) (Philippines)	Lau Wing Cheok; Salvador Banquiles	15; 5	15; 4

=== Thailand vs Burma ===
Thailand
3
Stadium Negara
24 August 1989, 19:30

Myanmar
0

			1	2	3
1	(Thailand) (Myanmar)	Sompol Kukasemkij; Tun Htein Win	15; 5	15; 5
2	(Thailand) (Myanmar)	Surachai Makkasasithorn; Maung Maung	15; 11	15; 7
3	(Thailand) (Myanmar)	Sawei Chanseorasmee / Sakrapee Thongsari; Maung Maung / Win Tun	15; 3	15; 6
4	(Thailand) (Myanmar)	Pramote Teerawiwatana / Siripong Siripool; Soe Myint Tin / Tun Nyein				not played
5	(Thailand) (Myanmar)	Vacharapan Khamthong; Tun Nyein				not played

=== Indonesia vs Laos ===
Indonesia
3
Stadium Negara
24 August 1989, 19:30

Laos
0

			1	2	3
1	(Indonesia) (Laos)	Eddy Kurniawan; Davone Luangkhot	15; 0	15; 1
2	(Indonesia) (Laos)	Alan Budikusuma; Lanoy Luangkhot	15; 0	15; 0
3	(Indonesia) (Laos)	Eddy Hartono / Icuk Sugiarto; Davone Luangkhot / Khamkouy Phontexa	15; 2	15; 0
4	(Indonesia) (Laos)	Aryono Miranat / Rudy Gunawan; Lanoy Luangkhot / Somsaveng Semsylvong				not played
5	(Indonesia) (Laos)	Joko Mardianto; Khamkouy Phontexa				not played

== Semi-finals ==
=== Indonesia vs Thailand ===
Indonesia
3
Stadium Negara
25 August 1989, 19:30

Thailand
0

			1	2	3
1	(Indonesia) (Thailand)	Eddy Kurniawan; Sompol Kukasemkij	15; 3	15; 7
2	(Indonesia) (Thailand)	Alan Budikusuma; Surachai Makkasasithorn	15; 4	15; 5
3	(Indonesia) (Thailand)	Eddy Hartono / Icuk Sugiarto; Sawei Chanseorasmee / Sakrapee Thongsari	15; 5	15; 8
4	(Indonesia) (Thailand)	Aryono Miranat / Rudy Gunawan; Pramote Teerawiwatana / Siripong Siripool				not played
5	(Indonesia) (Thailand)	Joko Mardianto; Vacharapan Khamthong				not played

=== Malaysia vs Singapore ===
Malaysia
3
Stadium Negara
25 August 1989, 19:30

Singapore
0

			1	2	3
1	(Malaysia) (Singapore)	Foo Kok Keong; Abdul Hamid Khan	18; 15	15; 11
2	(Malaysia) (Singapore)	Rashid Sidek; Lau Wing Cheok	15; 12	15; 4
3	(Malaysia) (Singapore)	Jalani Sidek / Razif Sidek; Lau Wing Cheok / Benson Wong	15; 2	15; 3
4	(Malaysia) (Singapore)	Ong Ewe Chye / Rahman Sidek; Abdul Hamid Khan / John Lim				not played
5	(Malaysia) (Singapore)	Wong Tat Meng; Donald Koh				not played

== Gold medal match ==
=== Indonesia vs Malaysia ===
Indonesia
0
Stadium Negara
26 August 1989, 19:00

Malaysia
3

			1	2	3
1	(Indonesia) (Malaysia)	Eddy Kurniawan; Foo Kok Keong	12; 15	15; 7	17; 18
2	(Indonesia) (Malaysia)	Alan Budikusuma; Rashid Sidek	16; 18	10; 15
3	(Indonesia) (Malaysia)	Eddy Hartono / Icuk Sugiarto; Jalani Sidek / Razif Sidek	6; 15	9; 15
4	(Indonesia) (Malaysia)	Rudy Gunawan / Aryono Miranat; Ong Ewe Chye / Rahman Sidek				not played
5	(Indonesia) (Malaysia)	Joko Mardianto; Wong Tat Meng				not played

== See also ==
- Individual event tournament
- Women's team tournament
