= Badminton at the 1989 SEA Games – Women's team =

Badminton – Women's team at the 1989 SEA Games
- Venue: Stadium Negara
- Dates: 24 – 26 August 1989
- Nations: 5

Medalists
gold medal	Indonesia (INA)
silver medal	Thailand (THA)
bronze medal	Malaysia (MAS)
bronze medal	Singapore (SIN)

The women's team badminton tournament at the 1989 SEA Games was held from 24 to 26 August 1989 at Stadium Negara.

== Schedule ==
All times are Malaysian Standard Time (UTC+08:00)

Date	Time	Event
Thursday, 24 August	19:30	First round
Friday, 25 August	19:30	Semi-finals
Saturday, 26 August	19:00	Gold medal match

== Bracket ==
1st round
Singapore	4
Philippines	1

Semi-finals
Indonesia	5
Singapore	0
Malaysia	2
Thailand	3

Gold medal match
Indonesia	5
Thailand	0

== First round ==
=== Singapore vs Philippines ===
Singapore
4
Stadium Negara
24 August 1989, 19:30

Philippines
1

			1	2	3
1	(Singapore) (Philippines)	Zarinah Abdullah; Amparo Lim	10; 12	11; 3	7; 11
2	(Singapore) (Philippines)	Soo Chiew Ming; Jeanette Villanueva	11; 7	11; 8
3	(Singapore) (Philippines)	Choy Leng Seong; Irene Viola	11; 3	11; 3
4	(Singapore) (Philippines)	Choy Leng Seong / Zarinah Abdullah; Amparo Lim / Irene Viola	15; 4	15; 3
5	(Singapore) (Philippines)	Ho Kam Meng / Irene Lee; Jeanette Villanueva / Raquel Uy	15; 9	15; 10

== Semi-finals ==
=== Indonesia vs Singapore ===
Indonesia
5
Stadium Negara
25 August 1989, 19:00

Singapore
0

			1	2	3
1	(Indonesia) (Singapore)	Susi Susanti; Zarinah Abdullah	11; 3	11; 3
2	(Indonesia) (Singapore)	Sarwendah Kusumawardhani; Soo Chiew Ming	11; 2	11; 4
3	(Indonesia) (Singapore)	Verawaty Fadjrin / Yanti Kusmiati; Choy Leng Seong / Zarinah Abdullah	15; 5	15; 5
4	(Indonesia) (Singapore)	Erma Sulistianingsih / Rosiana Tendean; Ho Kam Meng / Irene Lee	15; 4	15; 3
5	(Indonesia) (Singapore)	Lilik Sudarwati; Choy Leng Seong	11; 1	11; 3

=== Thailand vs Malaysia ===
Thailand
3
Stadium Negara
25 August 1989, 19:30

Malaysia
2

			1	2	3
1	(Thailand) (Malaysia)	Somharuthai Jaroensiri; Lee Wai Leng	11; 9	11; 9
2	(Thailand) (Malaysia)	Pornsawan Plungwech; Tan Mei Chuan	9; 11	8; 11
3	(Thailand) (Malaysia)	Ladawan Mulasartsatorn / Piyathip Sansaniyakulvilai; Tan Lee Wai / Tan Sui Hoon	7; 11	9; 11
4	(Thailand) (Malaysia)	Plernta Boonyarit / Penpan Klangthamniem; Lim Siew Choon / Lee Wai Leng	11; 5	11; 7
5	(Thailand) (Malaysia)	Thananya Phanachet; Lim Siew Choon	11; 5	11; 3

== Gold medal match ==
=== Indonesia vs Thailand ===
Indonesia
5
Stadium Negara
26 August 1989, 19:00

Thailand
0

			1	2	3
1	(Indonesia) (Thailand)	Susi Susanti; Somharuthai Jaroensiri	11; 5	11; 3
2	(Indonesia) (Thailand)	Sarwendah Kusumawardhani; Pornsawan Plungwech	11; 3	11; 2
3	(Indonesia) (Thailand)	Verawaty Fadjrin / Yanti Kusmiati; Ladawan Mulasartsatorn / Piyathip Sansaniyakulvilai	15; 6	15; 4
4	(Indonesia) (Thailand)	Erma Sulistianingsih / Rosiana Tendean; Plernta Boonyarit / Penpan Klangthamniem	15; 4	15; 7
5	(Indonesia) (Thailand)	Lilik Sudarwati; Thananya Phanachet	11; 1	11; 3

== See also ==
- Individual event tournament
- Men's team tournament
