= Malaysia at the 1991 SEA Games =

Malaysia at the 1991 Southeast Asian Games
- IOC code: MAS
- NOC: Olympic Council of Malaysia
- Website: www.olympic.org.my (in English)

in Manila
- Competitors: 352 in 26 sports
- Medals Ranked 4th: Gold 36 Silver 38 Bronze 65 Total 139

Southeast Asian Games appearances (overview)
- 1959; 1961; 1965; 1967; 1969; 1971; 1973; 1975; 1977; 1979; 1981; 1983; 1985; 1987; 1989; 1991; 1993; 1995; 1997; 1999; 2001; 2003; 2005; 2007; 2009; 2011; 2013; 2015; 2017; 2019; 2021; 2023; 2025; 2027; 2029

Malaysia competed in the 1991 Southeast Asian Games held in Manila, Philippines from 24 November to 3 December 1991.

== Medal summary ==
=== Medals by sport ===
Sport	Gold	Silver	Bronze	Total	Rank
Archery	0	0	1	1	3
Athletics	11	1	0	12	
Badminton	1	1	7	9	2
Basketball	0	0	2	2	4
Table tennis	0	0	2	2	4
Total	36	38	65	139	4

=== Medallists ===
Medal	Name	Sport	Event
Gold	Samson Vellabouy	Athletics	Men's 800 metres
Gold	Ramu Thangavalu	Athletics	Men's 1500 metres
Gold	Nur Herman Majid	Athletics	Men's 110 metres hurdles
Gold	Loo Cwee Peng	Athletics	Men's high jump
Gold	Mohamed Zaki Sadri	Athletics	Men's long jump
Gold	Mohamed Zaki Sadri	Athletics	Men's triple jump
Gold	Wong Tee Kue	Athletics	Men's hammer throw
Gold	Subramaniam Karunanithi	Athletics	Men's 10,000 metres track walk
Gold	Shanti Govindasamy	Athletics	Women's 200 metres
Gold	Jayanthi Palaniappan	Athletics	Women's 3000 metres
Gold	Lee Chiew Ha	Athletics	Women's shot put
Gold	Malaysia national badminton team: Cheah Soon Kit; Foo Kok Keong; Jalani Sidek; Ong Ewe Chye; Rashid Sidek; Razif Sidek; Soo Beng Kiang	Badminton	Men's team
Gold		Sepak takraw	Men's team
Silver	Shanti Govindasamy	Athletics	Women's 100 metres
Silver	Jalani Sidek; Razif Sidek	Badminton	Men's doubles
Bronze		Archery	Men's team recurve
Bronze	Foo Kok Keong	Badminton	Men's singles
Bronze	Rashid Sidek	Badminton	Men's singles
Bronze	Cheah Soon Kit; Soo Beng Kiang	Badminton	Men's doubles
Bronze	Tan Lee Wai; Tan Sui Hoon	Badminton	Women's doubles
Bronze	Soo Beng Kiang; Tan Lee Wai	Badminton	Mixed doubles
Bronze	Ong Ewe Chye; Tan Sui Hoon	Badminton	Mixed doubles
Bronze	Malaysia national badminton team	Badminton	Women's team
Bronze	Malaysia national basketball team	Basketball	Men's tournament
Bronze	Malaysia national basketball team	Basketball	Women's tournament
Bronze	Eng Tian Syh; Tay Choon Chai	Table tennis	Men's doubles
Bronze	Phua Bee Sim	Table tennis	Women's singles

== Basketball ==
=== Men's tournament ===
Preliminary round

Team	Pld	W	L	Pts
Philippines	4	4	0	8
Thailand	4	3	1	7
Malaysia	4	2	2	6
Singapore	4	1	3	5
Indonesia	4	0	4	4

2 December 1991
19:00

Recap

Philippines	87–69	Malaysia
Scoring by half: 47–33, 40–36
Pts: Limpot 25		Pts: Tan K.C. 21

Araneta Coliseum, Quezon City
Referees: Al Asfour Ahmad (KUW), Abdul Rachman (INA)

Bronze medal match

4 December 1991
15:30

Malaysia	103–80	Singapore
Scoring by half: 47–33, 40–36
Pts: Tan K.C. 24		Pts: Chua K.E. 16

Araneta Coliseum, Quezon City
Referees: Conrado Mercado (PHI), Bryan Tabanag (PHI)

=== Women's tournament ===
Preliminary round

Team	Pld	W	L	Pts
Thailand	5	5	0	10
Indonesia	5	4	1	9
Philippines	5	3	2	8
Malaysia	5	2	3	7
Myanmar	5	1	4	6
Singapore	5	0	5	5

30 November 1991
14:30

Malaysia	103–71	Myanmar
Scoring by half: 54–14, 49–47
Pts: Lew P.M. 18		Pts: Thew 23

Araneta Coliseum, Quezon City
Referees: Reynaldo Mata (PHI), Privado Tabanag (PHI)

1 December 1991
17:30

Indonesia	58–49	Malaysia
Scoring by half: 14–25, 44–24
Pts: Yuliga 19		Pts: Cheat K.N. 14

Araneta Coliseum, Quezon City
Referees: Manuel Salonga (PHI), Reynaldo Mata (PHI)

2 December 1991
17:30

Philippines	65–49	Malaysia
Scoring by half: 35–23, 30–26
Pts: Pastor 15		Pts: Lew P.M. 8

Araneta Coliseum, Quezon City
Referees: Rashad Amin (EGY), Chompoo Wachirasrisukanya (THA)

Bronze medal match

4 December 1991
14:00

Malaysia	88–79	Philippines
Scoring by half: 46–40, 42–39
Pts: Koh 16		Pts: Columna 24

Araneta Coliseum, Quezon City
Referees: U. Somkiat (THA), Chompoo Wachirasrisukanya (THA)

== Football ==
=== Men's tournament ===
Group B

Team	Pld	W	D	L	GF	GA	GD	Pts
Indonesia	3	3	0	0	5	1	+4	6
Philippines (H)	3	1	1	1	4	4	0	3
Malaysia	3	1	0	2	2	4	−2	2
Vietnam	3	0	1	2	3	5	−2	1

(H) Hosts
26 November 1991

Indonesia	2 – 0	Malaysia
Widodo C. Putro; Rocky Putiray

Rizal Memorial Stadium, Manila

28 November 1991

Philippines	1 – 0	Malaysia
Norman Fegidero

Rizal Memorial Stadium, Manila

30 November 1991

Malaysia	2 – 1	Vietnam
Azizol Abu Haniffah 21'; Matlan Marjan 84'		Nguyen Van Dung

Rizal Memorial Stadium, Manila
