= Malaysia at the 1989 SEA Games =

Malaysia at the 1989 Southeast Asian Games
- IOC code: MAS
- NOC: Olympic Council of Malaysia
- Website: www.olympic.org.my (in English)

in Kuala Lumpur
- Competitors: 354 in 20 sports
- Medals Ranked 2nd: Gold 67 Silver 58 Bronze 75 Total 200

Southeast Asian Games appearances (overview)
- 1959; 1961; 1965; 1967; 1969; 1971; 1973; 1975; 1977; 1979; 1981; 1983; 1985; 1987; 1989; 1991; 1993; 1995; 1997; 1999; 2001; 2003; 2005; 2007; 2009; 2011; 2013; 2015; 2017; 2019; 2021; 2023; 2025; 2027; 2029

Malaysia competed in the 1989 Southeast Asian Games as the host nation in Kuala Lumpur from 20 to 31 August 1989.

== Medal summary ==
=== Medals by sport ===
Sport	Gold	Silver	Bronze	Total	Rank
Athletics	12	0	0	12	
Badminton	1	1	10	12	2
Basketball	2	0	0	2	1
Football	1	0	0	1	1
Swimming	11	7	4	22	
Table tennis	2	1	1	4	1
Total	67	58	75	200	2

=== Medallists ===
Medal	Name	Sport	Event
Gold	Samson Vellabouy	Athletics	Men's 800 metres
Gold	Sivalingam Muthiah	Athletics	Men's 1500 metres
Gold	Zulkifli Mohamed Yatim	Athletics	Men's 110 metres hurdles
Gold	Sivabalan Kesavan	Athletics	Men's high jump
Gold	Mohamed Zaki Sadri	Athletics	Men's triple jump
Gold	Arjan Singh	Athletics	Men's shot put
Gold	Samret Singh Dhaliwal	Athletics	Men's hammer throw
Gold	Mohamed Nasir Sadri	Athletics	Men's decathlon
Gold	Baharuddin Jaafar, Kenny Martin, Samson Vellabouy, Nordin Mohd Jadi	Athletics	Men's 4 × 400 metres relay
Gold	Lee Chiew Ha	Athletics	Women's shot put
Gold	Norsham Yoon	Athletics	Women's javelin throw
Gold	Zaiton Othman	Athletics	Women's heptathlon
Gold	Malaysia national badminton team: Cheah Soon Kit; Foo Kok Keong; Jalani Sidek; Rahman Sidek; Rashid Sidek; Razif Sidek; Soo Beng Kiang	Badminton	Men's team
Gold	Malaysia national basketball team	Basketball	Men's tournament
Gold	Malaysia national basketball team	Basketball	Women's tournament
Gold	Malaysia national football team: A. Anbalagan; Muhamad Radhi Mat Din; P. Ravichandran; Lim Teong Kim; Zainal Abidin Hassan; Borhan Abu Samah; Dollah Salleh	Football	Men's tournament
Gold	Jeffrey Ong	Swimming	Men's 400 metre freestyle
Gold	Jeffrey Ong	Swimming	Men's 1500 metre freestyle
Gold	Nurul Huda Abdullah	Swimming	Women's 200 metre freestyle
Gold	Nurul Huda Abdullah	Swimming	Women's 400 metre freestyle
Gold	Nurul Huda Abdullah	Swimming	Women's 800 metre freestyle
Gold	Nurul Huda Abdullah	Swimming	Women's 200 metre backstroke
Gold	May Tan Seok Khoon	Swimming	Women's 100 metre butterfly
Gold	Nurul Huda Abdullah	Swimming	Women's 200 metre butterfly
Gold	Nurul Huda Abdullah	Swimming	Women's 200 metre individual medley
Gold	Nurul Huda Abdullah	Swimming	Women's 400 metre individual medley
Gold		Swimming	Women's 4 x 100 metre medley relay
Gold	Lim Chin Leong	Table tennis	Men's singles
Gold	Leong Mee Wan	Table tennis	Women's singles
Silver	Jalani Sidek; Razif Sidek	Badminton	Men's doubles
Silver	Lee Chee Keen	Swimming	Men's 200 metre breaststroke
Silver	Nurul Huda Abdullah	Swimming	Women's 100 metre freestyle
Silver	May Tan Seok Khoon	Swimming	Women's 200 metre freestyle
Silver	Jong Su Ting	Swimming	Women's 200 metre breaststroke
Silver	Nurul Huda Abdullah	Swimming	Women's 100 metre butterfly
Silver	May Tan Seok Khoon	Swimming	Women's 200 metre butterfly
Silver		Swimming	Men's waterpolo team
Silver	Lim Chin Leong; Peong Tah Seng	Table tennis	Men's doubles
Silver		Water polo	Men's tournament
Bronze	Foo Kok Keong	Badminton	Men's singles
Bronze	Rashid Sidek	Badminton	Men's singles
Bronze	Lee Wai Leng	Badminton	Women's singles
Bronze	Tan Mei Chuan	Badminton	Women's singles
Bronze	Rahman Sidek; Soo Beng Kiang	Badminton	Men's doubles
Bronze	Tan Lee Wai; Tan Sui Hoon	Badminton	Women's doubles
Bronze	Lee Wai Leng; Lim Siew Choon	Badminton	Women's doubles
Bronze	Soo Beng Kiang; Lim Siew Choon	Badminton	Mixed doubles
Bronze	Cheah Soon Kit; Tan Sui Hoon	Badminton	Mixed doubles
Bronze	Malaysia national badminton team: Lee Wai Leng; Lim Siew Choon; Tan Lee Wai; Tan Mei Chuan; Tan Sui Hoon	Badminton	Women's team
Bronze	Lee Chee Keen	Swimming	Men's 100 metre breaststroke
Bronze	May Tan Seok Khoon	Swimming	Women's 100 metre freestyle
Bronze	Chan Peck Hong	Swimming	Women's 100 metre backstroke
Bronze	Jong Su Ting	Swimming	Women's 100 metre breaststroke
Bronze	Lim Mui Liang; Tan Liang Chenck	Table tennis	Men's doubles

== Football ==
=== Men's tournament ===
Group B

Team	Pld	W	D	L	GF	GA	GD	Pts
Malaysia	3	3	0	0	7	1	+6	6
Indonesia	3	2	0	1	11	3	+8	4
Brunei	3	1	0	2	3	8	−5	2
Philippines	3	0	0	3	1	10	−9	0

21 August 1989
21:30

Malaysia	3 – 0	Philippines
A. Anbalagan 4', 41'; Muhamad Radhi Mat Din 28'

23 August 1989
19:45

Malaysia	2 – 1	Brunei
Muhamad Radhi Mat Din 28'; P. Ravichandran 86'		unknown 69'

25 August 1989
21:30

Malaysia	2 – 0	Indonesia
Lim Teong Kim 39', 52'

Referee: P. Boocherd (Thailand)

Semifinal

28 August 1989
21:30

Malaysia	1 – 0	Thailand
Zainal Abidin Hassan 71'

Referee: K. Kunalan (Singapore)

Gold medal match

31 August 1989
20:00

Malaysia	3 – 1	Singapore
Borhan Abu Samah 8' (o.g.); Lim Teong Kim 59'; Dollah Salleh 60'		Fandi Ahmad 39'

Stadium Merdeka, Kuala Lumpur
Attendance: 45,000
Referee: Drs H Soetoyo (Indonesia)
