= Badminton at the 1985 SEA Games – Women's team =

Badminton – Women's team at the 1985 SEA Games
- Venue: Chulalongkorn University Indoor Stadium
- Dates: 9 – 11 December 1985
- Nations: 5

Medalists
gold medal	Indonesia (INA)
silver medal	Thailand (THA)
bronze medal	Malaysia (MAL)
bronze medal	Singapore (SIN)

The women's team badminton tournament at the 1985 SEA Games was held from 9 to 11 December 1985 at the Chulalongkorn University Indoor Stadium.

== Schedule ==
All times are Thailand Standard Time (UTC+07:00)

Date	Time	Event
Monday, 9 December	09:00	First round
Monday, 9 December	19:00	Semi-finals
Tuesday, 11 December	13:00	Gold medal match

== Bracket ==
1st round
Malaysia (MAL)	5
Brunei (BRU)	0

Semi-finals
Indonesia (INA)	5
Malaysia (MAL)	0
Singapore (SIN)	1
Thailand (THA)	4

Gold medal match
Indonesia (INA)	4
Thailand (THA)	1

== First round ==
=== Malaysia vs Brunei ===
Malaysia
5
Chulalongkorn University Indoor Stadium
9 December 1985, 09:00

Brunei
0

			1	2	3
1	(Malaysia) (Brunei)	Juliet Poon; Hong Moi Leng	11; 0	11; 0
2	(Malaysia) (Brunei)	Leong Chai Lean; Zainab Ali Khan	11; 1	11; 1
3	(Malaysia) (Brunei)	Juliet Poon / Tan Sui Hoon; Hong Moi Leng / Nor Abdul Hamid	15; 1	15; 10
4	(Malaysia) (Brunei)	Kok Chan Fong / Leong Chai Lean; Zainab Ali Khan / Rusnah Mohamad	15; 1	15; 1
5	(Malaysia) (Brunei)	Tan Mei Chuan; Nor Abdul Hamid	11; 0	11; 1

== Semi-finals ==
=== Indonesia vs Malaysia ===
Indonesia
5
Chulalongkorn University Indoor Stadium
9 December 1985, 19:00

Malaysia
0

			1	2	3
1	(Indonesia) (Malaysia)	Ivana Lie; Juliet Poon	11; 1	11; 1
2	(Indonesia) (Malaysia)	Elizabeth Latief; Leong Chai Lean	11; 4	11; 3
3	(Indonesia) (Malaysia)	Rosiana Tendean / Imelda Wiguna; Juliet Poon / Tan Sui Hoon	15; 2	15; 2
4	(Indonesia) (Malaysia)	Ivana Lie / Verawaty Fadjrin; Kok Chan Fong / Leong Chai Lean	15; 7	15; 7
5	(Indonesia) (Malaysia)	Sarwendah Kusumawardhani; Tan Mei Chuan	11; 4	11; 1

=== Thailand vs Singapore ===
Thailand
4
Chulalongkorn University Indoor Stadium
9 December 1985, 19:00

Singapore
1

			1	2	3
1	(Thailand) (Singapore)	Ladawan Mulasartsatorn; Choy Leng Seong	11; 5	11; 6
2	(Thailand) (Singapore)	Darunee Lertvoralak; Irene Lee	5; 11	11; 6	11; 5
3	(Thailand) (Singapore)	Chitrad Chartrungsun / Phanwad Jinasuyanont; Choy Leng Seong / Irene Lee	15; 12	15; 2
4	(Thailand) (Singapore)	Jutatip Banjongsilp / Penpan Klangthamniem; Koh Ee Boon / Ng Geok Khim	15; 5	15; 1
5	(Thailand) (Singapore)	Phanwad Jinasuyanont; Ng Geok Khim				w/o

== Gold medal match ==
=== Indonesia vs Thailand ===
Indonesia
4
Chulalongkorn University Indoor Stadium
11 December 1985, 13:00

Thailand
1

			1	2	3
1	(Indonesia) (Thailand)	Ivana Lie; Ladawan Mulasartsatorn	11; 8	7; 11	11; 12
2	(Indonesia) (Thailand)	Elizabeth Latief; Darunee Lertvoralak	12; 11	8; 11	11; 6
3	(Indonesia) (Thailand)	Rosiana Tendean / Imelda Wiguna; Chitrad Chartrungsun / Phanwad Jinasuyanont	15; 1	15; 0
4	(Indonesia) (Thailand)	Verawaty Fadjrin / Ivana Lie; Jutatip Banjongsilp / Penpan Klangthamniem	15; 3	15; 5
5	(Indonesia) (Thailand)	Sarwendah Kusumawardhani; Phanwad Jinasuyanont	15; 3	15; 5

== See also ==
- Individual event tournament
- Men's team tournament
