= Badminton at the 1985 SEA Games – Men's team =

Badminton – Men's team at the 1985 SEA Games
- Venue: Chulalongkorn University Indoor Stadium
- Dates: 9 – 11 December 1985
- Nations: 7

Medalists
gold medal	Indonesia (INA)
silver medal	Malaysia (MAL)
bronze medal	Thailand (THA)
bronze medal	Singapore (SIN)

The men's team badminton tournament at the 1985 SEA Games was held from 9 to 11 December 1985 at the Chulalongkorn University Indoor Stadium.

== Schedule ==
All times are Thailand Standard Time (UTC+07:00)

Date	Time	Event
Monday, 9 December	09:00	First round
Monday, 9 December	19:00	Semi-finals
Tuesday, 11 December	13:00	Gold medal match

== Bracket ==
1st round
Singapore (SIN)	4
Brunei (BRU)	1
Thailand (THA)	3
Burma (BIR)	2
Philippines (PHI)	1
Malaysia (MAL)	4

Semi-finals
Indonesia (INA)	5
Singapore (SIN)	0
Thailand (THA)	2
Malaysia (MAL)	3

Gold medal match
Indonesia (INA)	5
Malaysia (MAL)	0

== First round ==
=== Singapore vs Brunei ===
Singapore
4
Chulalongkorn University Indoor Stadium
9 December 1985, 09:00

Brunei
1

			1	2	3
1	(Singapore) (Brunei)	Abdul Hamid Khan; Dallan Foo	15; 3	15; 5
2	(Singapore) (Brunei)	Lau Wing Cheok; Wahab Moksin	15; 8	15; 4
3	(Singapore) (Brunei)	Wong Shoon Keat / Wong Shoon Soo; Dallan Foo / Ishak Mohammad	15; 1	15; 11
4	(Singapore) (Brunei)	Abdul Hamid Khan / Lau Wing Cheok; Hamdan Abu Bakar / Tan Ket Kiong				w/o
5	(Singapore) (Brunei)	Benson Wong; Sabtu Awang Besar	15; 5	15; 3

=== Thailand vs Burma ===
Thailand
3
Chulalongkorn University Indoor Stadium
9 December 1985, 09:00

Burma
2

			1	2	3
1	(Thailand) (Myanmar)	Sompol Kukasemkij; Tun Htein Win	15; 12	15; 7
2	(Thailand) (Myanmar)	Sakrapee Thongsari; Myo Thant	15; 6	15; 4
3	(Thailand) (Myanmar)	Sakchai Thanasriwanijai / Kriangsak Traiwekin; Maung Maung / Tun Htein Win	15; 8	15; 8
4	(Thailand) (Myanmar)	Sawei Chanseorasmee / Sakrapee Thongsari; Soe Naing / Myo Thant				w/o
5	(Thailand) (Myanmar)	Suvit Sampattanavorachai; Maung Maung				w/o

=== Malaysia vs Philippines ===
Malaysia
4
Chulalongkorn University Indoor Stadium
9 December 1985, 09:00

Philippines
1

			1	2	3
1	(Malaysia) (Philippines)	Ong Beng Teong; Antonio Mance Jr.	15; 8	15; 1
2	(Malaysia) (Philippines)	Foo Kok Keong; Jessie Alonzo	15; 10	15; 9
3	(Malaysia) (Philippines)	Jalani Sidek / Razif Sidek; Jessie Alonzo / Renato Reyes	15; 2	18; 16
4	(Malaysia) (Philippines)	Chong Weng Kai / Chuah Han Khim; Errol Chan / Daniel So	15; 12	15; 5
5	(Malaysia) (Philippines)	Chong Weng Kai; Salvador Banquiles				w/o

== Semi-finals ==
=== Indonesia vs Singapore ===
Indonesia
5
Chulalongkorn University Indoor Stadium
9 December 1985, 19:00

Singapore
0

			1	2	3
1	(Indonesia) (Singapore)	Icuk Sugiarto; Abdul Hamid Khan	15; 9	15; 1
2	(Indonesia) (Singapore)	Eddy Kurniawan; Lau Wing Cheok	17; 9	15; 12
3	(Indonesia) (Singapore)	Liem Swie King / Hariamanto Kartono; Wong Shoon Keat / Wong Shoon Soo	15; 5	15; 3
4	(Indonesia) (Singapore)	Chafidz Yusuf / Christian Hadinata; Abdul Hamid Khan / Lau Wing Cheok	15; 11	15; 12
5	(Indonesia) (Singapore)	Liem Swie King; Wong Shoon Soo	15; 7	15; 3

=== Malaysia vs Thailand ===
Malaysia
3
Chulalongkorn University Indoor Stadium
9 December 1985, 19:00

Thailand
2

			1	2	3
1	(Malaysia) (Thailand)	Ong Beng Teong; Sompol Kukasemkij	6; 15	6; 15
2	(Malaysia) (Thailand)	Foo Kok Keong; Sakrapee Thongsari	15; 18	15; 10	15; 3
3	(Malaysia) (Thailand)	Jalani Sidek / Razif Sidek; Sakchai Thanasriwanijai / Kriangsak Traiwekin	15; 6	15; 3
4	(Malaysia) (Thailand)	Chong Weng Kai / Chuah Han Khim; Sawei Chanseorasmee / Sakrapee Thongsari	10; 15	8; 15
5	(Malaysia) (Thailand)	Razif Sidek; Sawei Chanseorasmee	15; 8	6; 15	15; 12

== Gold medal match ==
=== Indonesia vs Malaysia ===
Indonesia
5
Chulalongkorn University Indoor Stadium
11 December 1985, 13:00

Malaysia
0

			1	2	3
1	(Indonesia) (Malaysia)	Icuk Sugiarto; Ong Beng Teong	15; 3	15; 12
2	(Indonesia) (Malaysia)	Eddy Kurniawan; Foo Kok Keong	15; 12	15; 8
3	(Indonesia) (Malaysia)	Liem Swie King / Hariamanto Kartono; Jalani Sidek / Razif Sidek	10; 15	15; 12	15; 11
4	(Indonesia) (Malaysia)	Christian Hadinata / Chafidz Yusuf; Chong Weng Kai / Chuah Han Khim	15; 10	15; 8
5	(Indonesia) (Malaysia)	Liem Swie King; Chong Weng Kai	15; 8	15; 10

== See also ==
- Individual event tournament
- Women's team tournament
