= Pornsawan Plungwech =

Thai badminton player (born 1973)

Personal information
- Born: 15 January 1973 (age 53) Bangkok, Thailand
- Height: 1.72 m (5 ft 8 in)
- Weight: 60 kg (132 lb)

Sport
- Country: Thailand
- Sport: Badminton
- Handedness: Right

Women's singles & doubles
- Highest ranking: 13 (WS September 1996)
- BWF profile
Medal record
Women's badminton
Representing Thailand
Asian Championships
Bronze medal – third place	1996 Surabaya	Women's singles
Asian Cup
Bronze medal – third place	1994 Beijing	Women's doubles
Southeast Asian Games
Silver medal – second place	1989 Kuala Lumpur	Women's team
Silver medal – second place	1991 Manila	Women's team
Silver medal – second place	1993 Singapore	Women's team
Silver medal – second place	1995 Chiang Mai	Women's team
Silver medal – second place	1997 Jakarta	Women's team
Bronze medal – third place	1991 Manila	Women's singles
Bronze medal – third place	1995 Chiang Mai	Women's singles
Bronze medal – third place	1995 Chiang Mai	Women's doubles
Bronze medal – third place	1997 Jakarta	Women's singles

Pornsawan Plungwech (Thai: พรสวรรค์ ปลั่งเวช; born 15 January 1973) is a retired Thai badminton player who affiliate with Kasetsart University. She competed in women's singles at the 1992 Summer Olympics in Barcelona, and at the 1996 Summer Olympics in Atlanta.

== Career ==
Plungwech was part of Thai women's team that won the silver medals at the Southeast Asian Games from 1989 to 1997. She also won bronzes in the singles event in 1991, 1995, 1997, and in the women's doubles in 1995. She had won eleven Thai national championships title, three in the singles event, five in the women's doubles with Somharuthai Jaroensiri, and three in the mixed doubles with Siripong Siripool. She participated at the 1992 and 1996 Summer Olympics, but was eliminated in the third round in both years to Sarwendah Kusumawardhani and Han Jingna respectively.

Plungwech clinched the bronze medal at the 1996 Asian Championships held in Surabaya. She claimed her first and the only international title at the Brunei Open in the women's doubles event partnering with Thitikan Duangsiri. In December, she was invited to compete at the World Cup in Jakarta together with top exponents of the sport from various countries.

== Achievements ==
=== Asian Championships ===
Women's singles
Year	Venue	Opponent	Score	Result
1996	GOR Pancasila; Surabaya, Indonesia	(China) Gong Zhichao	11–4, 7–11, 5–11	Bronze

=== Asian Cup ===
Women's doubles
Year	Venue	Partner	Opponent	Score	Result
1994	Beijing Gymnasium; Beijing, China	(Thailand) Plernta Boonyarit	(South Korea) Chung So-young (South Korea) Jang Hye-ock	2–15, 5–15	Bronze

=== Southeast Asian Games ===
Women's singles
Year	Venue	Opponent	Score	Result
1991	Camp Crame Gymnasium; Manila, Philippines	(Indonesia) Susi Susanti	0–11, 3–11	Bronze
1995	Gymnasium 3, 700th Anniversary Sport Complex; Chiang Mai, Thailand	(Indonesia) Susi Susanti	6–11, 2–11	Bronze
1997	Asia-Africa Hall; Jakarta, Indonesia	(Singapore) Zarinah Abdullah	12–10, 11–1	Bronze

Women's doubles
Year	Venue	Partner	Opponent	Score	Result
1995	Gymnasium 3, 700th Anniversary Sport Complex; Chiang Mai, Thailand	(Thailand) Plernta Boonyarit	(Indonesia) Finarsih (Indonesia) Lili Tampi	7–15, 15–6, 7–15	Bronze

=== IBF World Grand Prix ===
The World Badminton Grand Prix sanctioned by International Badminton Federation (IBF) since 1983.

Women's doubles
Year	Tournament	Partner	Opponent	Score	Result
1996	Brunei Open	(Thailand) Thitikan Duangsiri	(England) Nichola Beck (England) Joanne Davies	15–8, 15–11	(gold) Winner
