= Sompol Kukasemkij =

Thai badminton player

Personal information
- Born: 24 January 1963 (age 63)
- Height: 1.68 m (5 ft 6 in)

Sport
- Country: Thailand
- Sport: Badminton
- Handedness: Right
- Event: Men's singles

Men's singles
- BWF profile
Medal record
Men's badminton
Representing Thailand
SEA Games
Bronze medal – third place	1985 Bangkok	Men's singles
Bronze medal – third place	1985 Bangkok	Men's team
Bronze medal – third place	1987 Jakarta	Men's team
Bronze medal – third place	1989 Kuala Lumpur	Men's team
Bronze medal – third place	1991 Manila	Men's team
Bronze medal – third place	1993 Singapore	Men's singles
Bronze medal – third place	1993 Singapore	Men's team

Sompol Kukasemkij (Thai: สมพล คูเกษมกิจ; born January 24, 1963) is a former Thai badminton player. He was one of the most important players in the late 1980s and early 1990s in this sport in Thailand.

== Career ==
In 1992 Sompol Kukasemkij joined the Olympics in men's singles. He won his first round match against Anders Nielsen, but lost in the second round against Alan Budikusuma. In 1990 he won in his home at the Thailand Open. In 1985 he was eliminated in the World Cup in the second round against Prakash Padukone. Two years earlier, he was the winner at the top of the podium at the Swiss Open.

Nationally, he won for the first time in the Thai championships in 1984 in men's singles. Eight other titles followed until the 1993.

Sompol Kukasemkij also served as the coach of Thailand national badminton team.

== Achievements ==
=== Southeast Asian Games ===
Men's singles

Year	Venue	Opponent	Score	Result
1985	Chulalongkorn University, Bangkok, Thailand	(Indonesia) Eddy Kurniawan	15–13, 9–15, 8–15	Bronze
1993	Singapore Badminton Hall, Singapore	(Indonesia) Hariyanto Arbi	18–13, 6–15, 6–15	Bronze

=== IBF World Grand Prix ===
The World Badminton Grand Prix sanctioned by International Badminton Federation (IBF) from 1983 to 2006.

Men's singles

Year	Tournament	Opponent	Score	Result
1988	Thailand Open	(China) Xiong Guobao	15–18, 13–15	(silver) Runner-up
1989	Thailand Open	(Indonesia) Alan Budikusuma	14–17, 8–15	(silver) Runner-up
1990	Thailand Open	(Indonesia) Alan Budikusuma	15–11, 18–13	(gold) Winner
1991	Thailand Open	(Indonesia) Alan Budikusuma	17–14, 1–15, 10–15	(silver) Runner-up
