= Badminton at the 1989 SEA Games =

Badminton tournament

- Venue: Cheras Stadium; Stadium Negara
- Location: Kuala Lumpur, Malaysia
- Dates: 20 – 31 August
- Nations: 7

Badminton at the 1989 SEA Games was held at Cheras Stadium and Stadium Negara, Kuala Lumpur, Malaysia. Events were conducted between 20 and 31 August. Final competitions were scheduled at Stadium Negara.

== Medal summary ==
=== Medal table ===
* Host nation (Malaysia)

Rank	Nation	Gold	Silver	Bronze	Total
1	Indonesia (INA)	6	5	1	12
2	Malaysia (MAS)*	1	1	10	12
3	Thailand (THA)	0	1	1	2
4	Singapore (SIN)	0	0	2	2
Totals (4 entries)		7	7	14	28

=== Medalists ===
Event	Gold	Silver	Bronze
Men's singles	Icuk Sugiarto; Indonesia	Eddy Kurniawan; Indonesia	Foo Kok Keong; Malaysia
Men's singles	Icuk Sugiarto; Indonesia	Eddy Kurniawan; Indonesia	Rashid Sidek; Malaysia
Women's singles	Susi Susanti; Indonesia	Sarwendah Kusumawardhani; Indonesia	Lee Wai Leng; Malaysia
Women's singles	Susi Susanti; Indonesia	Sarwendah Kusumawardhani; Indonesia	Tan Mei Chuan; Malaysia
Men's doubles	Rudy Gunawan; Eddy Hartono; Indonesia	Jalani Sidek; Razif Sidek; Malaysia	Soo Beng Kiang; Rahman Sidek; Malaysia
Men's doubles	Rudy Gunawan; Eddy Hartono; Indonesia	Jalani Sidek; Razif Sidek; Malaysia	Joko Mardianto; Aryono Miranat; Indonesia
Women's doubles	Erma Sulistianingsih; Rosiana Tendean; Indonesia	Verawaty Fadjrin; Yanti Kusmiati; Indonesia	Tan Lee Wai; Tan Sui Hoon; Malaysia
Women's doubles	Erma Sulistianingsih; Rosiana Tendean; Indonesia	Verawaty Fadjrin; Yanti Kusmiati; Indonesia	Lee Wai Leng; Lim Siew Choon; Malaysia
Mixed doubles	Eddy Hartono; Verawaty Fadjrin; Indonesia	Aryono Miranat; Minarti Timur; Indonesia	Soo Beng Kiang; Lim Siew Choon; Malaysia
Mixed doubles	Eddy Hartono; Verawaty Fadjrin; Indonesia	Aryono Miranat; Minarti Timur; Indonesia	Cheah Soon Kit; Tan Sui Hoon; Malaysia
Men's team	Malaysia; Cheah Soon Kit; Foo Kok Keong; Jalani Sidek; Rahman Sidek; Rashid Sidek; Razif Sidek; Soo Beng Kiang; Wong Tat Meng	Indonesia; Icuk Sugiarto; Eddy Kurniawan; Alan Budikusuma; Eddy Hartono; Rudy Gunawan; Aryono Miranat; Joko Mardianto	Singapore; Abdul Hamid Khan; Lau Wing Cheok; Benson Wong; Koh Leng Kang; John Lim
Men's team	Malaysia; Cheah Soon Kit; Foo Kok Keong; Jalani Sidek; Rahman Sidek; Rashid Sidek; Razif Sidek; Soo Beng Kiang; Wong Tat Meng	Indonesia; Icuk Sugiarto; Eddy Kurniawan; Alan Budikusuma; Eddy Hartono; Rudy Gunawan; Aryono Miranat; Joko Mardianto	Thailand; Sompol Kukasemkij; Sawei Chanseorasmee; Sakrapee Thongsari; Surachai Makkasasithorn; Siripong Siripool; Karoon Kasayapanan; Pramote Teerawiwatana; Vacharapan Khamthong
Women's team	Indonesia; Susi Susanti; Sarwendah Kusumawardhani; Lilik Sudarwati; Erma Sulistianingsih; Rosiana Tendean; Yanti Kusmiati; Verawaty Fadjrin; Minarti Timur	Thailand; Somharuthai Jaroensiri; Pornsawan Plungwech; Thananya Phanachet; Piyathip Sansaniyakulvilai; Ladawan Mulasartsatorn; Penpanor Klangthamnium; Plernta Boonyarit; Sasithorn Maneeratanaporn	Malaysia; Lee Wai Leng; Lim Siew Choon; Tan Lee Wai; Tan Mei Chuan; Tan Sui Hoon
Women's team	Indonesia; Susi Susanti; Sarwendah Kusumawardhani; Lilik Sudarwati; Erma Sulistianingsih; Rosiana Tendean; Yanti Kusmiati; Verawaty Fadjrin; Minarti Timur	Thailand; Somharuthai Jaroensiri; Pornsawan Plungwech; Thananya Phanachet; Piyathip Sansaniyakulvilai; Ladawan Mulasartsatorn; Penpanor Klangthamnium; Plernta Boonyarit; Sasithorn Maneeratanaporn	Singapore; Zarinah Abdullah; Choy Leng Siong; Irene Lee; Ho Kam Meng; Soo Chiew Meng; Tan Siok Choo

== Results ==
=== Men's singles ===
Semifinal
(Indonesia) Icuk Sugiarto	15	15
(Malaysia) Foo Kok Keong	12	5
(Malaysia) Rashid Sidek	10	7
(Indonesia) Eddy Kurniawan	15	15

Final
(Indonesia) Icuk Sugiarto	15	15
(Indonesia) Eddy Kurniawan	7	10

=== Women's singles ===
Semifinal
(Indonesia) Susi Susanti	11	11
(Malaysia) Lee Wai Leng	1	3
(Malaysia) Tan Mei Chuan	3	7
(Indonesia) Sarwendah Kusumawardhani	11	11

Final
(Indonesia) Susi Susanti	11	11
(Indonesia) Sarwendah Kusumawardhani	7	6

=== Men's doubles ===
Semi-finals
(Malaysia) Jalani Sidek (Malaysia) Razif Sidek	15	15
(Indonesia) Joko Mardianto (Indonesia) Aryono Miranat	1	8
(Malaysia) Soo Beng Kiang (Malaysia) Rahman Sidek	4	4
(Indonesia) Rudy Gunawan (Indonesia) Eddy Hartono	15	15

Final
(Malaysia) Jalani Sidek (Malaysia) Razif Sidek	11	12
(Indonesia) Rudy Gunawan (Indonesia) Eddy Hartono	15	15

=== Women's doubles ===
Semi-finals
(Indonesia) Verawaty Fadjrin (Indonesia) Yanti Kusmiati	15	15
(Malaysia) Tan Sui Hoon (Malaysia) Tan Lee Wai	12	9
(Malaysia) Lim Siew Choon (Malaysia) Lee Wai Leng	7	4
(Indonesia) Erma Sulistianingsih (Indonesia) Rosiana Tendean	15	15

Final
(Indonesia) Verawaty Fadjrin (Indonesia) Yanti Kusmiati	6	6
(Indonesia) Erma Sulistianingsih (Indonesia) Rosiana Tendean	15	15

=== Mixed doubles ===
Semi-finals
(Indonesia) Eddy Hartono (Indonesia) Verawaty Fadjrin	15	15
(Malaysia) Soo Beng Kiang (Malaysia) Lim Siew Choon	4	5
(Malaysia) Cheah Soon Kit (Malaysia) Tan Sui Hoon	14	1
(Indonesia) Aryono Miranat (Indonesia) Minarti Timur	18	15

Final
(Indonesia) Eddy Hartono (Indonesia) Verawaty Fadjrin	16	15	15
(Indonesia) Aryono Miranat (Indonesia) Minarti Timur	17	9	2
