= Badminton at the 1993 SEA Games =

Badminton tournament

- Venue: Singapore Badminton Hall
- Location: Singapore
- Dates: 12 – 20 June

Badminton at the 1993 SEA Games was held at Singapore Badminton Hall, Singapore. Indonesians dominated by winning six out of seven gold medals while Malaysia won a single gold in the men's doubles discipline.

== Medal summary ==
=== Medal table ===
* Host nation (Singapore)

Rank	Nation	Gold	Silver	Bronze	Total
1	Indonesia (INA)	6	5	1	12
2	Malaysia (MAS)	1	1	5	7
3	Thailand (THA)	0	1	5	6
4	Singapore (SIN)*	0	0	3	3
Totals (4 entries)		7	7	14	28

=== Medalists ===
Event	Gold	Silver	Bronze
Men's singles	Joko Suprianto; Indonesia	Hariyanto Arbi; Indonesia	Sompol Kukasemkij; Thailand
Men's singles	Joko Suprianto; Indonesia	Hariyanto Arbi; Indonesia	Ong Ewe Hock; Malaysia
Women's singles	Sarwendah Kusumawardhani; Indonesia	Yuliani Santosa; Indonesia	Somharuthai Jaroensiri; Thailand
Women's singles	Sarwendah Kusumawardhani; Indonesia	Yuliani Santosa; Indonesia	Zarinah Abdullah; Singapore
Men's doubles	Malaysia; Cheah Soon Kit; Soo Beng Kiang	Indonesia; Rexy Mainaky; Ricky Subagja	Indonesia; Rudy Gunawan; Denny Kantono
Men's doubles	Malaysia; Cheah Soon Kit; Soo Beng Kiang	Indonesia; Rexy Mainaky; Ricky Subagja	Malaysia; Tan Kim Her; Yap Kim Hock
Women's doubles	Indonesia; Finarsih; Lili Tampi	Indonesia; Eliza Nathanael; Zelin Resiana	Thailand; Ladawan Mulasartsatorn; Piyathip Sansaniyakulvilai
Women's doubles	Indonesia; Finarsih; Lili Tampi	Indonesia; Eliza Nathanael; Zelin Resiana	Malaysia; Lee Wai Leng; Tan Lee Wai
Mixed doubles	Indonesia; Rudy Gunawan; Eliza Nathanael	Indonesia; Denny Kantono; Minarti Timur	Malaysia; Tan Kim Her; Tan Lee Wai
Mixed doubles	Indonesia; Rudy Gunawan; Eliza Nathanael	Indonesia; Denny Kantono; Minarti Timur	Thailand; Pramote Teerawiwatana; Ladawan Mulasartsatorn
Men's team	Indonesia; Ricky Subagja; Heryanto Arbi; Rudy Gunawan; Denny Kantono; Rexy Mainaky; Joko Suprianto; Ardy Wiranata; Alan Budikusuma	Malaysia; Cheah Soon Kit; Ong Ewe Hock; Soo Beng Kiang; Tan Kim Her; Wong Ewee Mun; Yap Kim Hock; Yap Kim Hwee; Pang Chen	Thailand; Monthon Bumphenkeitikul; Kasemsak Chatujinda; Sompol Kukasemkij; Khunakorn Sudhisodhi; Pramote Teerawiwatana; Sakrapee Thongsari
Men's team	Indonesia; Ricky Subagja; Heryanto Arbi; Rudy Gunawan; Denny Kantono; Rexy Mainaky; Joko Suprianto; Ardy Wiranata; Alan Budikusuma	Malaysia; Cheah Soon Kit; Ong Ewe Hock; Soo Beng Kiang; Tan Kim Her; Wong Ewee Mun; Yap Kim Hock; Yap Kim Hwee; Pang Chen	Singapore; Abdul Razak Jaffar; Abdul Hamid Khan; Lim Boon Leng; Lim Hong Han; Patrick Lau; You Kok Kiong
Women's team	Indonesia; Finarsih; Sarwendah Kusumawardhani; Eliza Nathanael; Zelin Resiana; Yuliani Santosa; Lili Tampi; Minarti Timur	Thailand; Plernta Boonyarit; Somharuthai Jaroensiri; Ladawan Mulasartsatorn; Pornsawan Plungwech; Piyathip Sansaniyakulvilai; Natawan Yusakul; Chantid Thanissara; Navaporn Chupandilok	Malaysia; Lee Wai Leng; Zamaliah Sidek; Tan Lee Wai; Wong Mee Hung
Women's team	Indonesia; Finarsih; Sarwendah Kusumawardhani; Eliza Nathanael; Zelin Resiana; Yuliani Santosa; Lili Tampi; Minarti Timur	Thailand; Plernta Boonyarit; Somharuthai Jaroensiri; Ladawan Mulasartsatorn; Pornsawan Plungwech; Piyathip Sansaniyakulvilai; Natawan Yusakul; Chantid Thanissara; Navaporn Chupandilok	Singapore; Chin Yen Li; Chin Yen Peng; Irene Lee; Ong Aili; Tan Chi Teng; Tan Sian Peng; Zanetta Li Yu; Zarinah Abdullah

== Results ==
=== Men's singles ===
Semifinal
(Indonesia) Heryanto Arbi	13	15	15
(Thailand) Sompol Kukasemkij	18	6	6
(Malaysia) Ong Ewe Hock	16	4
(Indonesia) Joko Suprianto	17	15

Final
(Indonesia) Heryanto Arbi
(Indonesia) Joko Suprianto	w	/	o

=== Women's singles ===
Semifinal
(Indonesia) Sarwendah Kusumawardhani	11	11
(Thailand) Somharuthai Jaroensiri	5	5
(Singapore) Zarinah Abdullah	2	3
(Indonesia) Yuliani Sentosa	11	11

Final
(Indonesia) Sarwendah Kusumawardhani	11	9	11
(Indonesia) Yuliani Sentosa	6	11	2

=== Men's doubles ===
Semi-finals
(Indonesia) Rexy Mainaky (Indonesia) Ricky Subagja	15	15	17
(Malaysia) Tan Kim Her (Malaysia) Yap Kim Hock	17	7	14
(Indonesia) Rudy Gunawan (Indonesia) Denny Kantono	2	15	14
(Malaysia) Cheah Soon Kit (Malaysia) Soo Beng Kiang	15	12	17

Final
(Indonesia) Rexy Mainaky (Indonesia) Ricky Subagja	7	15	7
(Malaysia) Cheah Soon Kit (Malaysia) Soo Beng Kiang	15	11	15

=== Women's doubles ===
Semi-finals
(Indonesia) Finarsih (Indonesia) Lili Tampi	15	15
(Malaysia) Lee Wai Leng (Malaysia) Tan Lee Wai	12	9
(Thailand) Ladawan Mulasartsatorn (Thailand) Piyathip Sansaniyakulvilai	4	16
(Indonesia) Eliza Nathanael (Indonesia) Zelin Resiana	15	18

Final
(Indonesia) Finarsih (Indonesia) Lili Tampi	15	6	15
(Indonesia) Eliza Nathanael (Indonesia) Zelin Resiana	5	15	5

=== Mixed doubles ===
Semi-finals
(Indonesia) Rudy Gunawan (Indonesia) Eliza Nathanael	15	15
(Thailand) Pramote Teerawiwatana (Thailand) Ladawan Mulasartsatorn	12	3
(Malaysia) Tan Kim Her (Malaysia) Tan Lee Wai	5	2
(Indonesia) Denny Kantono (Indonesia) Minarti Timur	15	15

Final
(Indonesia) Rudy Gunawan (Indonesia) Eliza Nathanael	15	18
(Indonesia) Denny Kantono (Indonesia) Minarti Timur	6	15
