= Badminton at the 1987 SEA Games =

Badminton tournament

- Venue: Kuningan Hall
- Location: Jakarta, Indonesia
- Dates: 10 – 19 September
- Nations: 8

Badminton at the 1987 SEA Games was held at Kuningan Hall, Jakarta, Indonesia. Badminton events was held between 10 and 19 September.

== Medal winners ==
Event	Gold	Silver	Bronze
Men's singles	Icuk Sugiarto; Indonesia	Eddy Kurniawan; Indonesia	Misbun Sidek; Malaysia
Men's singles	Icuk Sugiarto; Indonesia	Eddy Kurniawan; Indonesia	Foo Kok Keong; Malaysia
Women's singles	Elizabeth Latief; Indonesia	Susi Susanti; Indonesia	Somharuthai Jaroensiri; Thailand
Women's singles	Elizabeth Latief; Indonesia	Susi Susanti; Indonesia	Ladawan Mulasartsatorn; Thailand
Men's doubles	Liem Swie King; Eddy Hartono; Indonesia	Sawei Chanseorasmee; Sakrapee Thongsari; Thailand	Bobby Ertanto; Rudy Heryanto; Indonesia
Men's doubles	Liem Swie King; Eddy Hartono; Indonesia	Sawei Chanseorasmee; Sakrapee Thongsari; Thailand	Ong Ewe Chye; Rahman Sidek; Malaysia
Women's doubles	Rosiana Tendean; Verawaty Fadjrin; Indonesia	Yanti Kusmiati; Erma Sulistianingsih; Indonesia	Ladawan Mulasartsatorn; Piyathip Sansaniyakulvilai; Thailand
Women's doubles	Rosiana Tendean; Verawaty Fadjrin; Indonesia	Yanti Kusmiati; Erma Sulistianingsih; Indonesia	Phanwad Jinasuyanont; Amporn Kaipituk; Thailand
Mixed doubles	Eddy Hartono; Verawaty Fadjrin; Indonesia	Richard Mainaky; Yanti Kusmiati; Indonesia	Sawei Chanseorasmee; Amporn Kaipituk; Thailand
Mixed doubles	Eddy Hartono; Verawaty Fadjrin; Indonesia	Richard Mainaky; Yanti Kusmiati; Indonesia	Surachai Makkasasithorn; Sasithorn Maneeratanaporn; Thailand
Men's team	Indonesia; Bobby Ertanto; Eddy Hartono; Rudy Heryanto; Eddy Kurniawan; Alan Budikusuma; Liem Swie King; Icuk Sugiarto; Richard Mainaky	Malaysia; Cheah Soon Kit; Foo Kok Keong; Kwan Yoke Meng; Ong Ewe Chye; Misbun Sidek; Rahman Sidek; Rashid Sidek; Wong Tat Meng	Thailand; Sawei Chanseorasmee; Sompol Kukasemkij; Surachai Makkasasithorn; Komchan Promsarin; Siripong Siripool; Sakrapee Thongsari; Kasemsak Chatujinda
Men's team	Indonesia; Bobby Ertanto; Eddy Hartono; Rudy Heryanto; Eddy Kurniawan; Alan Budikusuma; Liem Swie King; Icuk Sugiarto; Richard Mainaky	Malaysia; Cheah Soon Kit; Foo Kok Keong; Kwan Yoke Meng; Ong Ewe Chye; Misbun Sidek; Rahman Sidek; Rashid Sidek; Wong Tat Meng	Philippines; Jessie Alonzo; Salvador Banquiles; Antonio Mance Jr. Anthony Ave
Women's team	Indonesia; Yanti Kusmiati; Elizabeth Latief; Erma Sulistianingsih; Susi Susanti; Sarwendah Kusumawardhani; Lilik Sudarwati; Rosiana Tendean; Verawaty Fadjrin	Thailand; Ladawan Mulasartsatorn; Piyathip Sansaniyakulvilai; Somharuthai Jaroensiri; Sasithorn Maneeratanaporn; Amporn Kaipituk; Phanwad Jinasuyanont; Vilailak Sattayapun	Malaysia; Leong Chai Lean; Kok Chan Fong; Tan Mei Chuan; Tan Sui Hoon; Lim Siew Choon

== Results ==
=== Men's singles ===
Semifinal
(Indonesia) Icuk Sugiarto	15	15
(Malaysia) Foo Kok Keong	6	4
(Malaysia) Misbun Sidek	5	8
(Indonesia) Eddy Kurniawan	15	15

Final
(Indonesia) Icuk Sugiarto	15	0	15
(Indonesia) Eddy Kurniawan	13	15	9

=== Women's singles ===
Semifinal
(Indonesia) Elizabeth Latief	11	11
(Thailand) Somharuthai Jaroensiri	8	8
(Thailand) Ladawan Mulasartsatorn	3	4
(Indonesia) Susi Susanti	11	11

Final
(Indonesia) Elizabeth Latief	11	11
(Indonesia) Susi Susanti	5	9

=== Men's doubles ===
Semi-finals
(Indonesia) Liem Swie King (Indonesia) Eddy Hartono	18	15
(Malaysia) Rahman Sidek (Malaysia) Ong Ewe Chye	15	4
(Thailand) Sawei Chanseorasmee (Thailand) Sakrapee Thongsari	15	15
(Indonesia) Rudy Heryanto (Indonesia) Bobby Ertanto	13	7

Final
(Indonesia) Liem Swie King (Indonesia) Eddy Hartono	17	15
(Thailand) Sawei Chanseorasmee (Thailand) Sakrapee Thongsari	14	9

=== Women's doubles ===
Semi-finals
(Indonesia) Verawaty Fadjrin (Indonesia) Rosiana Tendean	15	15
(Thailand) Ladawan Mulasartsatorn (Thailand) Piyathip Sansaniyakulvilai	7	2
(Thailand) Amporn Kaipituk (Thailand) Phanwad Jinasuyanont	2	5
(Indonesia) Yanti Kusmiati (Indonesia) Erma Sulistianingsih	15	15

Final
(Indonesia) Verawaty Fadjrin (Indonesia) Rosiana Tendean	17	15	15
(Indonesia) Yanti Kusmiati (Indonesia) Erma Sulistianingsih	14	17	10

Discipline	Winner	Finalist	Score
Mixed doubles	(Indonesia) Eddy Hartono & Verawaty Fadjrin	(Indonesia) Richard Mainaky & Yanti Kusmiati	15–9, 17–14

== Medal table ==
Rank	Nation	Gold	Silver	Bronze	Total
1	Indonesia (INA)	7	4	1	12
2	Thailand (THA)	0	2	2	4
3	Malaysia (MAS)	0	1	4	5
4	Philippines (PHI)	0	0	1	1
Totals (4 entries)		7	7	8	22
