= 1992 Asian Badminton Championships =

Badminton championships

Tournament information
- Location: Cheras Indoor Stadium, Kuala Lumpur, Malaysia
- Dates: April 7–April 11

The 1992 Asian Badminton Championships was the 11th edition of the Badminton Asia Championships. It was held in Cheras Indoor Stadium, Kuala Lumpur, Malaysia, from April 7 to April 11. Men's singles and Men's doubles disciplines were won by Malaysia; Women's singles and Women's doubles by China and Indonesia won the Mixed doubles event.

== Medalists ==
Event	Gold	Silver	Bronze
Men's singles	(Malaysia) Rashid Sidek	(Malaysia) Foo Kok Keong	(Indonesia) Fung Permadi
Men's singles	(Malaysia) Rashid Sidek	(Malaysia) Foo Kok Keong	(Indonesia) Joko Suprianto
Women's singles	(China) Ye Zhaoying	(China) Zhou Lei	(Thailand) Somharuthai Jaroensiri
Women's singles	(China) Ye Zhaoying	(China) Zhou Lei	(South Korea) Ra Kyung-min
Men's doubles	(Malaysia) Razif Sidek (Malaysia) Jalani Sidek	(China) Huang Zhanzhong (China) Zheng Yumin	(Chinese Taipei) Ger Shin-ming (Chinese Taipei) Yang Shih-jeng
Men's doubles	(Malaysia) Razif Sidek (Malaysia) Jalani Sidek	(China) Huang Zhanzhong (China) Zheng Yumin	(Malaysia) Ong Ewe Chye (Malaysia) Rahman Sidek
Women's doubles	(China) Wu Yuhong (China) Pan Li	(Thailand) Ladawan Mulasartsatorn (Thailand) Piyathip Sansaniyakulvilai	(Japan) Yoshiko Iwata (Japan) Fujimi Tamura
Women's doubles	(China) Wu Yuhong (China) Pan Li	(Thailand) Ladawan Mulasartsatorn (Thailand) Piyathip Sansaniyakulvilai	(Malaysia) Tan Lee Wai (Malaysia) Tan Sui Hoon
Mixed doubles	(Indonesia) Joko Mardianto (Indonesia) Sri Untari	(Hong Kong) Chung Hoi Yuk (Hong Kong) Chan Siu Kwong	(Indonesia) Nunung Mudijanto (Indonesia) S. Herawati
Mixed doubles	(Indonesia) Joko Mardianto (Indonesia) Sri Untari	(Hong Kong) Chung Hoi Yuk (Hong Kong) Chan Siu Kwong	(Malaysia) Tan Kim Her (Malaysia) Tan Sui Hoon

== Medal table ==
Rank	Nation	Gold	Silver	Bronze	Total
1	China	2	2	0	4
2	Malaysia	2	1	3	6
3	Indonesia	1	0	2	3
4	Thailand	0	1	1	2
5	Hong Kong	0	1	0	1
6	Chinese Taipei	0	0	2	2
7	Japan	0	0	1	1
7	South Korea	0	0	1	1
Totals (8 entries)		5	5	10	20

== Final results ==
=== Men's singles ===
Semi-finals
(Malaysia) Rashid Sidek	15	15	15
(Indonesia) Joko Suprianto	8	17	8
(Indonesia) Fung Permadi	15	12	12
(Malaysia) Foo Kok Keong	11	15	15

Final
(Malaysia) Rashid Sidek	15	15
(Malaysia) Foo Kok Keong	9	3

=== Women's singles ===
Semi-finals
(China) Ye Zhaoying	4	11	11
(Thailand) Somharuthai Jaroensiri	11	6	3
(South Korea) Ra Kyung-min	12	8	5
(China) Zhou Lei	10	11	11

Final
(China) Ye Zhaoying	12	11
(China) Zhou Lei	10	2

=== Men's doubles ===
Semi-finals
(Malaysia) Jalani Sidek (Malaysia) Razif Sidek	15	15
(Malaysia) Ong Ewe Chye (Malaysia) Rahman Sidek	4	9
(China) Huang Zhanzhong (China) Zheng Yumin	15	15
(Chinese Taipei) Ger Shin-ming (Chinese Taipei) Yang Shih-jeng	7	6

Final
(Malaysia) Jalani Sidek (Malaysia) Razif Sidek	15	15
(China) Huang Zhanzhong (China) Zheng Yumin	4	6

=== Women's doubles ===
Semi-finals
(Japan) Yoshiko Iwata (Japan) Fujimi Tamura	8	8
(Thailand) Ladawan Mulasartsatorn (Thailand) Piyathip Sansaniyakulvilai	15	15
(Malaysia) Tan Lee Wai (Malaysia) Tan Sui Hoon	6	5
(China) Pan Li (China) Wu Yuhong	15	15

Final
(Thailand) Ladawan Mulasartsatorn (Thailand) Piyathip Sansaniyakulvilai	0	6
(China) Pan Li (China) Wu Yuhong	15	15

=== Mixed doubles ===
Semi-finals
(Hong Kong) Chan Siu Kwong (Hong Kong) Chung Hoi Yuk	15	15
(Indonesia) Nunung Mudijanto (Indonesia) S. Herawati	11	2
(Malaysia) Tan Kim Her (Malaysia) Tan Sui Hoon	6	14
(Indonesia) Joko Mardianto (Indonesia) Sri Untari	15	15

Final
(Hong Kong) Chan Siu Kwong (Hong Kong) Chung Hoi Yuk	10	17	7
(Indonesia) Joko Mardianto (Indonesia) Sri Untari	15	14	15
