= Badminton at the 1991 SEA Games =

- Venue: Camp Crame Gymnasium
- Location: Quezon City, Metro Manila, Philippines
- Dates: 28 November – 5 December

The badminton competitions at the 1991 SEA Games in Manila were held at Camp Crame Gymnasium in Quezon City, Metro Manila. The 1991 Games featured competitions in seven events (men 3 events, women 3 events, and mixed 1 event).

== Medal summary ==
=== Medal table ===
* Host nation (Philippines)

Rank	Nation	Gold	Silver	Bronze	Total
1	Indonesia (INA)	6	5	1	12
2	Malaysia (MAS)	1	1	7	9
3	Thailand (THA)	0	1	4	5
Totals (3 entries)		7	7	12	26

=== Medalists ===
Event	Gold	Silver	Bronze
Men's singles	Ardy Wiranata; Indonesia	Joko Suprianto; Indonesia	Foo Kok Keong; Malaysia
Men's singles	Ardy Wiranata; Indonesia	Joko Suprianto; Indonesia	Rashid Sidek; Malaysia
Women's singles	Susi Susanti; Indonesia	Sarwendah Kusumawardhani; Indonesia	Pornsawan Plungwech; Thailand
Women's singles	Susi Susanti; Indonesia	Sarwendah Kusumawardhani; Indonesia	Somharuthai Jaroensiri; Thailand
Men's doubles	Indonesia; Rudy Gunawan; Eddy Hartono	Malaysia; Razif Sidek; Jalani Sidek	Malaysia; Soo Beng Kiang; Cheah Soon Kit
Men's doubles	Indonesia; Rudy Gunawan; Eddy Hartono	Malaysia; Razif Sidek; Jalani Sidek	Indonesia; Rexy Mainaky; Ricky Subagja
Women's doubles	Indonesia; Rosiana Tendean; Erma Sulistianingsih	Indonesia; Finarsih; Lili Tampi	Malaysia; Tan Lee Wai; Tan Sui Hoon
Women's doubles	Indonesia; Rosiana Tendean; Erma Sulistianingsih	Indonesia; Finarsih; Lili Tampi	Thailand; Ladawan Mulasartsatorn; Thananya Phanachet
Mixed doubles	Indonesia; Ricky Subagja; Rosiana Tendean	Indonesia; Rexy Mainaky; Erma Sulistianingsih	Malaysia; Soo Beng Kiang; Tan Lee Wai
Mixed doubles	Indonesia; Ricky Subagja; Rosiana Tendean	Indonesia; Rexy Mainaky; Erma Sulistianingsih	Malaysia; Ong Ewe Chye; Tan Sui Hoon
Men's team	Malaysia; Cheah Soon Kit; Foo Kok Keong; Jalani Sidek; Rashid Sidek; Razif Sidek; Soo Beng Kiang; Kwan Yoke Meng	Indonesia; Rexy Mainaky; Ricky Subagja; Alan Budikusuma; Eddy Hartono; Rudy Gunawan; Ardy Wiranata; Joko Suprianto	Thailand; Sompol Kukasemkij; Teeranun Chiangta; Chaiwat Chalermpusitarak; Surachai Makkasasithorn; Siripong Siripool; Pramote Teerawiwatana; Pulsak Thewarangsee
Men's team	Malaysia; Cheah Soon Kit; Foo Kok Keong; Jalani Sidek; Rashid Sidek; Razif Sidek; Soo Beng Kiang; Kwan Yoke Meng	Indonesia; Rexy Mainaky; Ricky Subagja; Alan Budikusuma; Eddy Hartono; Rudy Gunawan; Ardy Wiranata; Joko Suprianto	Singapore; Abdul Hamid Khan; Lim Boon Leng; Yow Chong Liang; Donald Koh; You Kok Kiong; Patrick Lau; Lim Hong Han
Women's team	Indonesia; Susi Susanti; Sarwendah Kusumawardhani; Erma Sulistianingsih; Rosiana Tendean; Finarsih; Lili Tampi; Yuliani Sentosa	Thailand; Somharuthai Jaroensiri; Pornsawan Plungwech; Thananya Phanachet; Ladawan Mulasartsatorn; Plernta Boonyarit; Sasithorn Maneeratanaporn	Malaysia; Lee Wai Leng; Lim Siew Choon; Tan Lee Wai; Tan Sui Hoon
Women's team	Indonesia; Susi Susanti; Sarwendah Kusumawardhani; Erma Sulistianingsih; Rosiana Tendean; Finarsih; Lili Tampi; Yuliani Sentosa	Thailand; Somharuthai Jaroensiri; Pornsawan Plungwech; Thananya Phanachet; Ladawan Mulasartsatorn; Plernta Boonyarit; Sasithorn Maneeratanaporn	Philippines; Amparo Lim; Martha Millar; Maria Elena Garcia; Racquel Roxas

== Men's team ==
=== Semi-final ===
Indonesia
5

Thailand
0

			1	2	3
1	(Indonesia) (Thailand)	Ardy Wiranata; Sompol Kukasemkij	15; 3	15; 12
2	(Indonesia) (Thailand)	Eddy Hartono / Rudy Gunawan; Siripong Siripool / Pramote Teerawiwatana	15; 11	15; 9
3	(Indonesia) (Thailand)	Alan Budikusuma; Pulsak Thewarangsee	15; 2	15; 7
4	(Indonesia) (Thailand)	Rexy Mainaky / Ricky Subagja; Chaiwat Chalermpusitarak / Surachai Makkasasithorn	15; 5	15; 2
5	(Indonesia) (Thailand)	Joko Suprianto; Teeranun Chiangta	18; 15	15; 3

Malaysia
5

Singapore
0

		1	2	3
1	(Malaysia) (Singapore)
2	(Malaysia) (Singapore)
3	(Malaysia) (Singapore)
4	(Malaysia) (Singapore)
5	(Malaysia) (Singapore)

=== Bronze medal match ===
Thailand

Singapore

		1	2	3
1	(Thailand) (Singapore)
2	(Thailand) (Singapore)
3	(Thailand) (Singapore)
4	(Thailand) (Singapore)
5	(Thailand) (Singapore)

=== Gold medal match ===
Malaysia
3

Indonesia
2

			1	2	3
1	(Malaysia) (Indonesia)	Rashid Sidek; Ardy Wiranata	6; 15	15; 12	15; 10
2	(Malaysia) (Indonesia)	Foo Kok Keong; Alan Budikusuma	15; 18	15; 11	15; 11
3	(Malaysia) (Indonesia)	Razif Sidek / Jalani Sidek; Rudy Gunawan / Eddy Hartono	15; 3	5; 15	2; 15
4	(Malaysia) (Indonesia)	Soo Beng Kiang / Cheah Soon Kit; Rexy Mainaky / Ricky Subagja	15; 10	9; 15	17; 15
5	(Malaysia) (Indonesia)	Kwan Yoke Meng; Joko Suprianto	w	/	o

== Women's team ==
=== Semi-final ===
Indonesia
5

Malaysia
0

			1	2	3
1	(Indonesia) (Malaysia)	Susi Susanti; Lee Wai Leng	11; 3	11; 4
2	(Indonesia) (Malaysia)	Rosiana Tendean / Erma Sulistianingsih; Tan Lee Wai / Tan Sui Hoon	15; 6	12; 15	15; 3
3	(Indonesia) (Malaysia)	Sarwendah Kusumawardhani; Lim Siew Choon	11; 1	11; 1
4	(Indonesia) (Malaysia)	Finarsih / Lili Tampi; Lee Wai Leng / Lim Siew Choon	15; 5	15; 5
5	(Indonesia) (Malaysia)	Yuliani Sentosa; Tan Lee Wai	11; 3	11; 5

Thailand
5

Philippines
0

		1	2	3
1	(Thailand) (Philippines)
2	(Thailand) (Philippines)
3	(Thailand) (Philippines)
4	(Thailand) (Philippines)
5	(Thailand) (Philippines)

=== Bronze medal match ===
Malaysia

Philippines

		1	2	3
1	(Malaysia) (Philippines)
2	(Malaysia) (Philippines)
3	(Malaysia) (Philippines)
4	(Malaysia) (Philippines)
5	(Malaysia) (Philippines)

=== Gold medal match ===
Indonesia
5

Thailand
0

			1	2	3
1	(Indonesia) (Thailand)	Susi Susanti; Somharuthai Jaroensiri	11; 3	11; 7
2	(Indonesia) (Thailand)	Sarwendah Kusumawardhani; Pornsawan Plungwech	11; 1	11; 7
3	(Indonesia) (Thailand)	Rosiana Tendean / Erma Sulistianingsih; Plernta Boonyarit / Sasithorn Maneeratanaporn	15; 8	15; 12
4	(Indonesia) (Thailand)	Finarsih / Lili Tampi; Somharuthai Jaroensiri / Ladawan Mulasartsatorn	15; 13	15; 9
5	(Indonesia) (Thailand)	Yuliani Sentosa; Plernta Boonyarit	11; 2	11; 2

== Men's singles ==
First Round
Win Tun Htein (MYA)	2	3
Teeranun Chiangta (THA)	15	15
Nguyễn Anh Hoàng (VIE)	15	15
Martin Lee Millar (PHI)	3	3
Foo Kok Keong (MAS)	15	15
Abdul Hamid Khan (SIN)	3	9
Aung Naing Htet (MYA)	5	8
Antonio Mance Jr. (PHI)	15	15
Sompol Kukasemkij (THA)	15	15
Donald Koh (SIN)	6	8

Quarter-finals
Ardy Wiranata (INA)	15	15
Teeranun Chiangta (THA)	6	5
Nguyễn Anh Hoàng (VIE)	3	11
Foo Kok Keong (MAS)	15	15
Joko Suprianto (INA)	15	15
Antonio Mance Jr. (PHI)	5	7
Sompol Kukasemkij (THA)	10	15	4
Rashid Sidek (MAS)	15	6	15

Semi-finals
Ardy Wiranata (INA)	15	15
Foo Kok Keong (MAS)	4	10
Joko Suprianto (INA)	15	15
Rashid Sidek (MAS)	10	9

Final
Ardy Wiranata (INA)	15	15
Joko Suprianto (INA)	4	6

== Women's singles ==
First Round
Martha Millar (PHI)	11	12
Mai Dương Liên Nương (VIE)	2	9
Lim Siew Choon (MAS)	11	11
Amparo Lim (PHI)	6	6

Quarter-finals
Susi Susanti (INA)	11	11
Lee Wai Leng (MAS)	0	4
Martha Millar (PHI)	6	5
Pornsawan Plungwech (THA)	11	11
Somharuthai Jaroensiri (THA)	11	11
Lim Siew Choon (MAS)	6	2
Zarinah Abdullah (SIN)	2	2
Sarwendah Kusumawardhani (INA)	11	11

Semi-finals
Susi Susanti (INA)	11	11
Pornsawan Plungwech (THA)	0	3
Somharuthai Jaroensiri (THA)	11	5	8
Sarwendah Kusumawardhani (INA)	6	11	11

Final
Susi Susanti (INA)	5	11	11
Sarwendah Kusumawardhani (INA)	11	8	2

== Men's doubles ==
First Round
Kyaw Thi Ha (MYA); Kyaw Zwar Lin (MYA)	5	11
Ricardo Santos (PHI); Jacques Zialcita Louis (PHI)	15	15
Siripong Siripool (THA); Pramote Teerawiwatana (THA)	15	15
Lim Boon Leng (SIN); Yow Chong Liang (SIN)	10	1
Chaiwat Chalermpusitarak (THA); Surachai Makkasasithorn (THA)	15	15
Aung Naing Htet (MYA); Win Tun Htein (MYA)	10	1
Jesus Araneta Martin (PHI); Anthony Ave (PHI)	15	15
Patrick Lau (SIN); Lim Hong Han (SIN)	11	10

Quarter-finals
Razif Sidek (MAS); Jalani Sidek (MAS)	15	15
Ricardo Santos (PHI); Jacques Zialcita Louis (PHI)	2	2
Siripong Siripool (THA); Pramote Teerawiwatana (THA)	15	9
Rexy Mainaky (INA); Ricky Subagja (INA)	17	15
Soo Beng Kiang (MAS); Cheah Soon Kit (MAS)	15	15
Chaiwat Chalermpusitarak (THA); Surachai Makkasasithorn (THA)	5	2
Jesus Araneta Martin (PHI); Anthony Ave (PHI)	6	6
Rudy Gunawan (INA); Eddy Hartono (INA)	15	15

Semi-finals
Razif Sidek (MAS); Jalani Sidek (MAS)	15	12	15
Rexy Mainaky (INA); Ricky Subagja (INA)	6	15	6
Soo Beng Kiang (MAS); Cheah Soon Kit (MAS)	7	3
Rudy Gunawan (INA); Eddy Hartono (INA)	15	15

Final
Razif Sidek (MAS); Jalani Sidek (MAS)	11	6
Rudy Gunawan (INA); Eddy Hartono (INA)	15	15

== Women's doubles ==
Quarter-finals			Semi-finals			Final
Rosiana Tendean (INA); Erma Sulistianingsih (INA)	15	15
Maria Elena Garcia (PHI); Racquel Roxas (PHI)	1	4	Rosiana Tendean (INA); Erma Sulistianingsih (INA)	15	15
Lee Wai Leng (MAS); Lim Siew Choon (MAS)	12	8	Ladawan Mulasartsatorn (THA); Thananya Phanachet (THA)	10	5
Ladawan Mulasartsatorn (THA); Thananya Phanachet (THA)	15	15				Rosiana Tendean (INA); Erma Sulistianingsih (INA)	15	15
Tan Lee Wai (MAS); Tan Sui Hoon (MAS)	15	15				Finarsih (INA); Lili Tampi (INA)	10	10
Amparo Lim (PHI); Martha Millar (PHI)	2	10	Tan Lee Wai (MAS); Tan Sui Hoon (MAS)	10	4
Finarsih (INA); Lili Tampi (INA)	15	15	Finarsih (INA); Lili Tampi (INA)	15	15
Plernta Boonyarit (THA); Sasithorn Maneeratanaporn (THA)	2	5

== Mixed doubles ==
First Round
Nguyễn Anh Hoàng (VIE); Mai Dương Liên Nương (VIE)	2	15	12
Jethanan Ramnani (PHI); Racquel Roxas (PHI)	15	12	15

Quarter-finals
Siripong Siripool (THA); Ladawan Mulasartsatorn (THA)	15	5	3
Soo Beng Kiang (MAS); Tan Lee Wai (MAS)	13	15	15
Jethanan Ramnani (PHI); Racquel Roxas (PHI)	2	4
Ricky Subagja (INA); Rosiana Tendean (INA)	15	15
Rexy Mainaky (INA); Erma Sulistianingsih (INA)	15	15
Pulsak Thewarangsee (THA); Plernta Boonyarit (THA)	0	2
Enrique John Campos (PHI); Jeanette Villanueva (PHI)	3	1
Ong Ewe Chye (MAS); Tan Sui Hoon (MAS)	15	15

Semi-finals
Soo Beng Kiang (MAS); Tan Lee Wai (MAS)	3	5
Ricky Subagja (INA); Rosiana Tendean (INA)	15	15
Rexy Mainaky (INA); Erma Sulistianingsih (INA)	15	15
Ong Ewe Chye (MAS); Tan Sui Hoon (MAS)	5	5

Final
Ricky Subagja (INA); Rosiana Tendean (INA)	15	15
Rexy Mainaky (INA); Erma Sulistianingsih (INA)	6	13
