= Athletics at the 1991 SEA Games =

The athletics competition at the 1991 SEA Games was held at the Rizal Memorial Stadium, Manila, Philippines

== Medal table ==
Rank	Nation	Gold	Silver	Bronze	Total
1	Thailand (THA)	12	8	9	29
2	Malaysia (MAS)	11	7	9	27
3	Philippines (PHI)	8	8	8	24
4	Indonesia (INA)	7	14	7	28
5	Myanmar (MYA)	6	5	9	20
6	Vietnam (VIE)	0	1	1	2
7	Brunei (BRU)	0	1	0	1
8	Singapore (SIN)	0	0	1	1
Totals (8 entries)		44	44	44	132

== Medal summary ==
=== Men ===
Event	Gold		Silver		Bronze	
100 m	(Indonesia) Mardi Lestari	10.44	(Thailand) Visut Watanasin	10.59	(Malaysia) Abdul Rahman Koyakutty	10.74
200 m	(Thailand) Seaksarn Boonrat	20.94 CR	(Thailand) Wongsupgaroen Watchara	21.04	(Myanmar) Kyaw Htoo Aung	21.36
400 m	(Thailand) Aktawat Sakoolchan	46.37	(Philippines) Isidro del Prado	46.98	(Thailand) Anucha Satirangsimon	47.06
800 m	(Malaysia) Samson Vellabuoy	1:48.96	(Myanmar) Tun Win Thein	1:50.61	(Malaysia) Rama Thangavellu	1:50.89
1500 m	(Malaysia) Rama Thangavellu	3:50.44	(Indonesia) Samuel Huwae	3:52.74	(Myanmar) Tun Wein Thein	3:54.10
5.000 m	(Indonesia) Subeno	14:12.66 CR	(Indonesia) Eduardus Nabunome	14:13.41	(Philippines) Hector Begeo	14:35.36
10.000 m	(Indonesia) Eduardus Nabunome	30:07.72 CR	(Indonesia) Osias Kamiase	30:09.50	(Philippines) Enrico Rosin	31:39.79
Marathon	(Philippines) Herman Suizo	2hr:22:52 CR	(Philippines) Primo Ramos	2hr:25:51	(Thailand) Choochart Srihawong	2hr:26:23
110 m hurdles	(Malaysia) Nur Herman Majid	14.15 CR	(Malaysia) Hamdi Jafaar	14.27	(Thailand) Ameekpol Mongkoldech	14.35
400 m hurdles	(Thailand) Chanon Keanchan	50.94 CR	(Myanmar) Htay Win	52.07	(Malaysia) Hamdi Jafaar	52.15
3.000 m steeplechase	(Philippines) Hector Begeo	8:55.85 CR	(Indonesia) Parlautan Siregar	9:01.09	(Indonesia) Samuel Huwae	9:15.48
4 × 100 m relay	Thailand	39.78	Indonesia	40.27	Malaysia	40.79
4 × 400 m relay	Thailand	3:06.74	Malaysia	3:08.98	Philippines	3:13.65
10 km walk	(Malaysia) Subramaniam Karunanithi	44:50.39	(Myanmar) Tun Tin	45:21.85	(Indonesia) Jamaluddin Lawa	45:47.85
20 km walk	(Myanmar) Tun Tin	1:35.30 CR	(Malaysia) Subramaniam Karunanithi	1:36.47	(Myanmar) Apparao	1:37.59
Pole vault	(Philippines) Edward Lasquete	4.80 m	(Indonesia) Nirmah Rampai	4.65	(Indonesia) Hadi Wacono	4.55
High Jump	(Malaysia) Lou Cwee Peng	2.17 m CR	(Thailand) Arit Chairak	2.13	(Thailand) Phithun Hreanthong	2.07
Long Jump	(Malaysia) Mohammad Zaki Sadri	7.60 m	(Indonesia) Eko Subagyo	7.29	(Philippines) Alexander Ligtas	7.14
Triple Jump	(Malaysia) Mohammad Zaki Sadri	15.91 m	(Malaysia) Sidik Sahak	15.49	(Thailand) Tangborn Thaveghalermdit	15.44
Hammer Throw	(Malaysia) Wong Tee Kui	55.54 m CR	(Philippines) Agustin Jarina	49.64	(Indonesia) Daniel Gianto	48.70
Discus Throw	(Philippines) Fidel Repizo	52.1 m CR	(Thailand) Adul Kerdsri	49.04	(Myanmar) Hein Shwe	47.84
Javelin Throw	(Indonesia) Frans Mahuse	75.18 m	(Indonesia) Fredy Mahuse	71.14	(Malaysia) Mohd Yasin Imran	69.24
Shot put	(Thailand) Bancha Supanroj	16.25 m	(Malaysia) Arjan Singh	15.86	(Indonesia) I Wayan Gunaksi	15.15
Decathlon	(Indonesia) Timotius Niken		(Thailand) Watchara Wongsupcharden		(Malaysia) Hanapiah Nasir	

=== Women ===
Event	Gold		Silver		Bronze	
100 m Wind: +1.3 m/s	(Philippines) Lydia de Vega Mercado	11.44	(Malaysia) Shanti Govindasamy	11.63	(Philippines) Elma Muros	11.67
200 m	(Malaysia) Shanti Govindasamy	23.92	(Philippines) Lydia de Vega Mercado	23.95	(Thailand) Ratjai Sripet	24.15
400 m	(Thailand) Noodang Pimpol	53.44 CR	(Thailand) Reawadee Srithoa	53.74	(Malaysia) Josephine Mary Singarayar	53.78
800 m	(Thailand) Sukanya Sang-Nguen	2:07.11	(Indonesia) Ester Sumah	2:07.81	(Thailand) Sprirat Chimrak	2:08.94
1.500 m	(Myanmar) Khin Khin Htwe	4:22.95	(Philippines) Marietta Magno	4:24.97	(Indonesia) Marsel Ina Pupan	4:27.15
3.000 m	(Malaysia) Palaniappan Jayanthi	9:26.96	(Myanmar) Khin Khin Htwe	9:38.18	(Indonesia) Agida Amaral	9:41.94
10.000 m	(Myanmar) Khin Khin Htwe	35:46.44	(Indonesia) Suryati Marija	35:52.95	(Malaysia) Palaniappan Jayanthi	36:09.53
Marathon	(Indonesia) Maria Lawalata	2hr:51:09	(Myanmar) Victoria	2hr:52:08	(Myanmar) Kay Thi Cho	3hr:00:23
100 m hurdles	(Philippines) Elma Muros	13.66 CR	(Brunei) Mapsita Kemal Samat	14.57	(Vietnam) Nguyen Thu Hang	14.61
400 m hurdles	(Thailand) Reawadee Srithoa	56.78 CR	(Philippines) Elma Muros	57.58	(Philippines) Nene Gamo	1:01.85
4 × 100 m relay	Thailand	44.95	Philippines	45.29	Malaysia	45.65
4 × 400 m relay	Thailand	3:53.53	Malaysia	3:42.08	Philippines	3:44.31
5 km walk	(Myanmar) Ma Kyin Lwan	24:03.79 CR	(Indonesia) Hasiate Lawole	24:24.84	(Myanmar) Cho Cho Tet	25:21.57
10 km walk	(Myanmar) Ma Kyin Lwan	51:45.01	(Indonesia) Hasiate Lawole	51:50.80	(Myanmar) Cho Cho Tet	53:01.10
High Jump	(Thailand) Jaruwan Jenjudkarn	1.82 m CR	(Vietnam) Vu My Hanh	1.80	(Philippines) Cherry Ann Janiva	1.76
Long Jump	(Philippines) Elma Muros	15.91 m	(Thailand) Dokjarn Dokduang	15.49	(Myanmar) Soe Soe Nyen	15.44
Discus throw	(Myanmar) Aye Aye Nwe	47.44 m	(Thailand) Sunia Nwe	43.00	(Philippines) Dorie Cortejo	41.84
Javelin throw	(Indonesia) Tati Ratnaningsih	50.76 m	(Philippines) Erlinda Lavandia	46.82	(Thailand) Somchitr Kotsombat	45.04
Shot put	(Malaysia) Lee Chiew Ha	14.10 m	(Indonesia) Junita Paomey	13.82	(Myanmar) Aye Aye Nwe	12.81
Hepthatlon	(Philippines) Nene Gamo	5.125 pts	(Indonesia) Rumini	5.036	(Singapore) Yu Long Nyu	4.831
