= Lee Wai Leng =

Malaysian badminton player

Lee Wai Leng 李慧玲
Personal information
- Born: 11 November 1969 (age 57)
- Height: 1.64 m (5 ft 5 in)

Sport
- Country: Malaysia
- Sport: Badminton
- Handedness: Right
- Event: Doubles

Doubles
- BWF profile
Medal record
Women's badminton
Representing Malaysia
Commonwealth Games
Silver medal – second place	1994 Victoria	Mixed team
Bronze medal – third place	1994 Victoria	Women's doubles
Asian Games
Bronze medal – third place	1994 Hiroshima	Mixed doubles
Southeast Asian Games
Bronze medal – third place	1989 Kuala Lumpur	Women's singles
Bronze medal – third place	1989 Kuala Lumpur	Women's doubles
Bronze medal – third place	1989 Kuala Lumpur	Women's team
Bronze medal – third place	1991 Manila	Women's team
Bronze medal – third place	1993 Singapore	Women's doubles
Bronze medal – third place	1993 Singapore	Women's team

Lee Wai Leng (born 11 November 1969) is a former Malaysian badminton player. Lee was the bronze medalist at the Commonwealth games with Tan Lee Wai, and she won Mixed team silver medal also where she played singles and doubles in final but Malaysia lost to England. Lee also got a bronze in 1994 Asian Games, with Yap Kim Hock in mixed doubles event, becoming the first ever Malaysian pair to medal in badminton at this discipline at the Asian Games. Lee has also won a total of five medals at the Southeast Asian Games, which includes her three at 1989 edition and rest at 1993. She had also represented her country in the World Championship between 1989 and 1993.

== Achievements ==
=== Commonwealth Games ===
Women's doubles
Year	Venue	Partner	Opponent	Score	Result
1994	McKinnon Gym, University of Victoria, British Columbia, Canada	(Malaysia) Tan Lee Wai	(England) Julie Bradbury (England) Gillian Clark	17–18, 17–14, 9–15	Bronze

=== Asian Games ===
Mixed doubles
Year	Venue	Partner	Opponent	Score	Result
1994	Tsuru Memorial Gymnasium, Hiroshima, Japan	(Malaysia) Yap Kim Hock	(South Korea) Kang Kyung-jin (South Korea) Jang Hye-ock	11–15, 3–15	Bronze

=== Southeast Asian Games ===
Women's singles
Year	Venue	Opponent	Score	Result
1989	Stadium Negara, Kuala Lumpur, Malaysia	(Indonesia) Susi Susanti	1–11, 3–11	Bronze

Women's doubles
Year	Venue	Partner	Opponent	Score	Result
1989	Stadium Negara, Kuala Lumpur, Malaysia	(Malaysia) Lim Siew Choon	(Indonesia) Erma Sulistianingsih (Indonesia) Rosiana Tendean	7–15, 4–15	Bronze
1993	Singapore Badminton Hall; Singapore	(Malaysia) Tan Lee Wai	(Indonesia) Finarsih (Indonesia) Lili Tampi	12–15, 9–15	Bronze
