= Ong Ewe Chye =

Malaysian badminton player

Ong Ewe Chye 王友财
Personal information
- Born: 1 June 1965 (age 61) Penang, Malaysia
- Years active: 1983-1993
- Height: 1.72 m (5 ft 8 in)

Sport
- Country: Malaysia
- Sport: Badminton
- Handedness: Right

Men's doubles & Mixed doubles
- Career title: 2
Medal record
Representing Malaysia
Men's badminton
Thomas Cup
Silver medal – second place	1990 Tokyo	Team
Asian Championships
Bronze medal – third place	1989 Shanghai	Men's team
Bronze medal – third place	1992 Kuala Lumpur	Men's doubles
Asian Cup
Bronze medal – third place	1991 Jakarta	Mixed doubles
Southeast Asian Games
Gold medal – first place	1991 Manila	Men's team
Silver medal – second place	1987 Jakarta	Men's team
Bronze medal – third place	1987 Jakarta	Men's doubles
Bronze medal – third place	1991 Manila	Mixed doubles

Ong Ewe Chye

Chinese name
- Simplified Chinese: 王友财
- Hanyu Pinyin: Wáng Yǒu Cái

Ong Ewe Chye (born 1 June 1965) is a former badminton player from Malaysia. He is the elder brother of Ong Ewe Hock.

== Achievements ==
=== Asian Championships ===
Men's doubles

Year	Venue	Partner	Opponent	Score	Result
1992	Cheras Indoor Stadium, Kuala Lumpur, Malaysia	(Malaysia) Rahman Sidek	(Malaysia) Razif Sidek (Malaysia) Jalani Sidek	4–15, 9–15	Bronze

=== Asian Cup ===
Mixed doubles

Year	Venue	Partner	Opponent	Score	Result
1991	Istora Senayan, Jakarta, Indonesia	(Malaysia) Tan Sui Hoon	(South Korea) Shon Jin-hwan (South Korea) Gil Young-ah	4–15, 4–15	Bronze

=== Southeast Asian Games ===
Men's doubles

Year	Venue	Partner	Opponent	Score	Result
1987	Kuningan Hall, Jakarta, Indonesia	(Malaysia) Rahman Sidek	(Indonesia) Eddy Hartono (Indonesia) Liem Swie King	15–18, 4–15	Bronze

Mixed doubles

Year	Venue	Partner	Opponent	Score	Result
1991	Camp Crame Gymnasium, Manila, Philippines	(Malaysia) Tan Sui Hoon	(Indonesia) Rexy Mainaky (Indonesia) Erma Sulistianingsih	5–15, 5–15	Bronze

=== IBF World Grand Prix ===
The World Badminton Grand Prix sanctioned by International Badminton Federation (IBF) from 1983 to 2006.

Men's doubles

Year	Tournament	Partner	Opponent	Score	Result
1988	Swiss Open	(Malaysia) Rahman Sidek	(Malaysia) Ong Beng Teong (Malaysia) Cheah Soon Kit	9–15, 6–15	(silver) Runner-up
1990	German Open	(Malaysia) Rahman Sidek	(Denmark) Mark Christiansen (Denmark) Michael Kjeldsen	17–14, 15–12	(gold) Winner
1990	Canadian Open	(Malaysia) Rahman Sidek	(Canada) Mike Bitten (Canada) Bryan Blanshard	15–11, 15–10	(gold) Winner
