= Tan Lee Wai =

Malaysian badminton player

Tan Lee Wai 陈丽慧
Personal information
- Born: 20 July 1970 (age 56)
- Height: 1.64 m (5 ft 5 in)

Sport
- Country: Malaysia
- Sport: Badminton
- Handedness: Right
- Event: Doubles

Doubles
- BWF profile
Medal record
Women's badminton
Representing Malaysia
Commonwealth Games
Silver medal – second place	1994 Victoria	Mixed team
Bronze medal – third place	1994 Victoria	Women's doubles
Asian Championships
Bronze medal – third place	1992 Kuala Lumpur	Women's doubles
Asian Cup
Bronze medal – third place	1994 Beijing	Mixed doubles
Southeast Asian Games
Bronze medal – third place	1989 Kuala Lumpur	Women's doubles
Bronze medal – third place	1989 Kuala Lumpur	Women's team
Bronze medal – third place	1991 Manila	Women's doubles
Bronze medal – third place	1991 Manila	Mixed doubles
Bronze medal – third place	1991 Manila	Women's team
Bronze medal – third place	1993 Singapore	Women's doubles
Bronze medal – third place	1993 Singapore	Mixed doubles
Bronze medal – third place	1993 Singapore	Women's team

Tan Lee Wai (born 20 July 1970) is a former Malaysian badminton player. At the 1989 South east Asian games, Tan won bronze medal in doubles and women's team event. In 1991 and 1993 Southeast Asian Games, Tan won 3 bronze medals respectively at each games. At the Asian championship in 1992, she won bronze in doubles with Tan Sui Hoon. In 1994 she won bronze medal at the Commonwealth Games and in Asian Cup with Lee Wai Leng. She also represented her country twice in World championships in two disciplines.

== Achievements ==
=== Commonwealth Games ===
Women's doubles
Year	Venue	Partner	Opponent	Score	Result
1994	McKinnon Gym, University of Victoria, British Columbia, Canada	(Malaysia) Lee Wai Leng	(England) Julie Bradbury (England) Gillian Clark	17–18, 17–14, 9–15	Bronze

=== Asian Championships ===
Women's doubles
Year	Venue	Partner	Opponent	Score	Result
1992	Cheras Indoor Stadium, Kuala Lumpur, Malaysia	(Malaysia) Tan Sui Hoon	(China) Pan Li (China) Wu Yuhong	6–15, 5–15	Bronze

=== Asian Cup ===
Mixed doubles
Year	Venue	Partner	Opponent	Score	Result
1994	Beijing Gymnasium, Beijing, China	(Malaysia) Tan Kim Her	(China) Liu Jianjun (China) Ge Fei	2–15, 2–15	Bronze

=== Southeast Asian Games ===
Women's doubles
Year	Venue	Partner	Opponent	Score	Result
1989	Stadium Negara, Kuala Lumpur, Malaysia	(Malaysia) Tan Sui Hoon	(Indonesia) Verawaty Fadjrin (Indonesia) Yanti Kusmiati	12–15, 9–15	Bronze
1991	Camp Crame Gymnasium, Manila, Philippines	(Malaysia) Tan Sui Hoon	(Indonesia) Finarsih (Indonesia) Lili Tampi	10–15, 4–15	Bronze
1993	Singapore Badminton Hall; Singapore	(Malaysia) Lee Wai Leng	(Indonesia) Finarsih (Indonesia) Lili Tampi	12–15, 9–15	Bronze

Mixed doubles
Year	Venue	Partner	Opponent	Score	Result
1991	Camp Crame Gymnasium, Manila, Philippines	(Malaysia) Soo Beng Kiang	(Indonesia) Ricky Subagja (Indonesia) Rosiana Tendean	3–15, 5–15	Bronze
1993	Singapore Badminton Hall, Singapore	(Malaysia) Tan Kim Her	(Indonesia) Denny Kantono (Indonesia) Minarti Timur	5–15, 2–15	Bronze

=== IBF International ===
Women's doubles
Year	Tournament	Partner	Opponent	Score	Result
1992	Brunei Open	(Malaysia) Kuak Seok Choon	(Indonesia) Rosalina Riseu (Indonesia) Lilik Sudarwati	3–15, 0–15	(silver) Runner-up
