= Rahman Sidek =

Malaysian badminton player and coach

Personal information
- Nickname: Aman
- Born: Abdul Rahman bin Mohd Sidek; 19 September 1966 (age 60) Banting, Selangor, Malaysia
- Years active: 1983-1993
- Height: 1.75 m (5 ft 9 in)

Sport
- Country: Malaysia
- Sport: Badminton
- Handedness: Right

Men's doubles
- Highest ranking: 4 (1990)
- BWF profile
Medal record
Representing Malaysia
Men's badminton
Thomas Cup
Gold medal – first place	1992 Kuala Lumpur	Team
Silver medal – second place	1990 Tokyo	Team
Asian Championships
Bronze medal – third place	1992 Kuala Lumpur	Men's doubles
Southeast Asian Games
Gold medal – first place	1989 Kuala Lumpur	Men's team
Silver medal – second place	1987 Jakarta	Men's team
Bronze medal – third place	1987 Jakarta	Men's doubles
Bronze medal – third place	1989 Kuala Lumpur	Men's doubles

Abdul Rahman Mohd Sidek AMN (born 19 September 1966) is a Malaysian former badminton player and coach.

== Personal life ==
He is the 4th child of the 5 legendary Sidek brothers who represented Malaysia in the sport of badminton internationally. Rahman and his siblings gained exposure about badminton sport from their father, Haji Mohd Sidek. Under the guidance of his father, Rahman and the rest of his siblings were trained to be champions. Furthermore, Rahman is one of the alumnus of Victoria Institution (batch 1979–1984) amongst the batch of Malaysia's prominent sportsmen who also attended that school just like him.

== Career ==
He is an international doubles player during the late 1980s to early 1990s. He managed to win a number of international title such as the Canadian Open and German Open with partner Ong Ewe Chye. Rahman Sidek was a member in the winning team at the Thomas Cup 1992. He retired because his partner quit the sport.

== Coaching ==
After he retired, he was appointed as Malaysian national doubles coach. Then, he and his brothers established a badminton club to find new talented players, called Nusa Mahsuri. He has been coaching in Nusa Mahsuri, the first professional badminton club in Malaysia from 1996 until now.

== Achievements ==
=== Asian Championships ===
Men's doubles

Year	Venue	Partner	Opponent	Score	Result
1992	Cheras Indoor Stadium, Kuala Lumpur, Malaysia	(Malaysia) Ong Ewe Chye	(Malaysia) Razif Sidek (Malaysia) Jalani Sidek	4–15, 9–15	Bronze

=== Southeast Asian Games ===
Men's doubles

Year	Venue	Partner	Opponent	Score	Result
1987	Kuningan Hall, Jakarta, Indonesia	(Malaysia) Ong Ewe Chye	(Indonesia) Eddy Hartono (Indonesia) Liem Swie King	15–18, 4–15	Bronze
1989	Stadium Negara, Kuala Lumpur, Malaysia	(Malaysia) Soo Beng Kiang	(Indonesia) Eddy Hartono (Indonesia) Rudy Gunawan	4–15, 4–15	Bronze

=== IBF World Grand Prix ===
The World Badminton Grand Prix sanctioned by International Badminton Federation (IBF) from 1983 to 2006.

Men's doubles

Year	Tournament	Partner	Opponent	Score	Result
1988	Swiss Open	(Malaysia) Ong Ewe Chye	(Malaysia) Ong Beng Teong (Malaysia) Cheah Soon Kit	9–15, 6–15	(silver) Runner-up
1990	German Open	(Malaysia) Ong Ewe Chye	(Denmark) Mark Christiansen (Denmark) Michael Kjeldsen	17–14, 15–12	(gold) Winner
1990	Canadian Open	(Malaysia) Ong Ewe Chye	(Canada) Mike Bitten (Canada) Bryan Blanshard	15–11, 15–10	(gold) Winner

== Honour ==
- Malaysia
  - Member of the Order of the Defender of the Realm (AMN) (1992)

== See also ==
- Misbun Sidek
- Razif Sidek
- Jalani Sidek
- Rashid Sidek
