= Somharuthai Jaroensiri =

Thai badminton player

Personal information
- Born: 15 November 1971 (age 54) Nakhon Pathom, Thailand
- Height: 1.61 m (5 ft 3 in)
- Weight: 66 kg (146 lb)

Sport
- Country: Thailand
- Sport: Badminton
- Event: Women's singles & doubles

Women's singles & doubles
- BWF profile
Medal record
Women's badminton
Representing Thailand
World Cup
Bronze medal – third place	1993 New Delhi	Women's singles
Asian Championships
Bronze medal – third place	1992 Kuala Lumpur	Women's singles
Asian Cup
Bronze medal – third place	1991 Jakarta	Women's singles
Bronze medal – third place	1995 Qingdao	Women's singles
Bronze medal – third place	1996 Seoul	Women's singles
Southeast Asian Games
Silver medal – second place	1987 Jakarta	Women's team
Silver medal – second place	1989 Kuala Lumpur	Women's team
Silver medal – second place	1991 Manila	Women's team
Silver medal – second place	1993 Singapore	Women's team
Silver medal – second place	1995 Chiang Mai	Women's singles
Silver medal – second place	1995 Chiang Mai	Women's team
Silver medal – second place	1997 Jakarta	Women's team
Bronze medal – third place	1987 Jakarta	Women's singles
Bronze medal – third place	1991 Manila	Women's singles
Bronze medal – third place	1993 Singapore	Women's singles

Somharuthai Jaroensiri (Thai: สมหฤทัย เจริญศิริ, RTGS: Somharuethai Charoensiri; born 15 November 1971) is a Thai retired badminton player. She competed in women's singles at the 1992 Summer Olympics in Barcelona, and at the 1996 Summer Olympics in Atlanta.

== Career ==
Jaroensiri competed in 1992 and 1996 Summer Olympics in the women's singles, with her best achievement at the Olympics was reaching in the quarterfinals in 1992, losing to eventual gold medalist, Susi Susanti, of Indonesia, 11–6, 11–1. She won bronze medals at the 1992 Asian Championships and 1993 World Cup. She participated in six consecutive Southeast Asian Games from 1987 to 1997, and helped the team win the silver medals, other than that, she won three medals in the women's singles event, a silver in 1995, and two bronzes in 1991 and 1993. She also competed at the 1990 and 1994 Asian Games.

== Achievements ==
=== World Cup ===
Women's singles

Year	Venue	Opponent	Score	Result
1993	Indira Gandhi Arena, New Delhi, India	(Indonesia) Susi Susanti	0–11, 9–11	Silver

=== Asian Championships ===
Women's singles

Year	Venue	Opponent	Score	Result
1992	Cheras Indoor Stadium, Kuala Lumpur, Malaysia	(China) Ye Zhaoying	11–4, 6–11, 3–11	Bronze

=== Asian Cup ===
Women's singles

Year	Venue	Opponent	Score	Result
1991	Istora Senayan, Jakarta, Indonesia	(China) Tang Jiuhong	5–11, 9–11	Bronze
1995	Xinxing Gymnasium, Qingdao, China	(Indonesia) Mia Audina	11–8, 5–11, 3–11	Bronze
1996	Olympic Gymnasium No. 2, Seoul, South Korea	(China) Zhang Ning	2–11, 4–11	Bronze

=== Southeast Asian Games ===
Women's singles

Year	Venue	Opponent	Score	Result
1987	Kuningan Hall, Jakarta, Indonesia	(Indonesia) Elizabeth Latief	8–11, 8–11	Bronze
1991	Camp Crame Gymnasium, Manila, Philippines	(Indonesia) Sarwendah Kusumawardhani	11–6, 5–11, 8–11	Bronze
1993	Singapore Badminton Hall, Singapore	(Indonesia) Sarwendah Kusumawardhani	5–11, 5–11	Bronze
1995	Gymnasium 3, 700th Anniversary Sport Complex, Chiang Mai, Thailand	(Indonesia) Susi Susanti	4–11, 0–11	Silver

=== World Junior Championships ===
The Bimantara World Junior Championships was an international invitation badminton tournament for junior players. It was held in Jakarta, Indonesia from 1987 to 1991.

Girls' singles

Year	Venue	Opponent	Score	Result
1988	Jakarta, Indonesia	(China) Huang Ying	11–8, 6–11, 1–11	Bronze

Girls' doubles

Year	Venue	Partner	Opponent	Score	Result
1988	Jakarta, Indonesia	(Thailand) Piyathip Sansaniyakulvilai	(South Korea) Bang Soo-hyun (South Korea) Shon Hye-joo	12–15, 5–15	Bronze

=== IBF World Grand Prix ===
The World Badminton Grand Prix was sanctioned by the International Badminton Federation from 1983 to 2006.

Women's singles

Year	Tournament	Opponent	Score	Result
1991	Chinese Taipei Open	(Indonesia) Susi Susanti	1–11, 2–11	(silver) Runner-up
1993	Thailand Open	(Indonesia) Susi Susanti	10–12, 2–11	(silver) Runner-up
