= Eddy Kurniawan =

Indonesian badminton player (born 1962)

Personal information
- Born: 2 July 1962 (age 64) Semarang, Central Java, Indonesia

Sport
- Country: Indonesia
- Sport: Badminton
- BWF profile
Medal record
Men's badminton
Representing Indonesia
World Championships
Bronze medal – third place	1989 Jakarta	Men's singles
World Cup
Bronze medal – third place	1988 Bangkok	Men's singles
Sudirman Cup
Gold medal – first place	1989 Jakarta	Mixed team
Thomas Cup
Gold medal – first place	1984 Kuala Lumpur	Men's team
Silver medal – second place	1986 Jakarta	Men's team
Bronze medal – third place	1988 Kuala Lumpur	Men's team
Bronze medal – third place	1990 Nagoya-Tokyo	Men's team
Asian Games
Bronze medal – third place	1986 Seoul	Men's team
Asian Championships
Silver medal – second place	1983 Calcutta	Men's singles
Silver medal – second place	1987 Semarang	Men's team
Bronze medal – third place	1991 Kuala Lumpur	Men's singles
Bronze medal – third place	1983 Calcutta	Men's team
Southeast Asian Games
Gold medal – first place	1985 Bangkok	Men's team
Gold medal – first place	1987 Jakarta	Men's team
Silver medal – second place	1985 Bangkok	Men's singles
Silver medal – second place	1987 Jakarta	Men's singles
Silver medal – second place	1989 Kuala Lumpur	Men's team
Silver medal – second place	1989 Kuala Lumpur	Men's singles

Eddy Kurniawan (Chinese: 罗天宁; born 2 July 1962 in Semarang, Central Java) is a retired Chinese-Indonesian male badminton player.

== Career ==
Kurniawan's prime years, the mid to late 1980s, were a period of Chinese domination of international men's singles competition. Though he frequently appeared in the later rounds of major international tournaments, the hard-fighting Kurniawan rarely won them. One exception was his victory at the 1990 World Badminton Grand Prix, where he defeated Malaysia's Rashid Sidek in the final. He won the Australian Open in 1992. Kurniawan was a bronze medalist at the 1989 IBF World Championships in Jakarta. Perhaps the highlight of his career was his performance at the 1989 Sudirman Cup (combined men's and women's team world championship) when his victories over Korean opponents in both singles and mixed doubles in the last two matches of the contest secured the title for Indonesia.

== Achievements ==
=== IBF World Championships ===
Men's Singles

1989 IBF World Championships – Men's singles
Round	Opponent	Score	Result
Semifinal	(Indonesia) Ardy Wiranata	18–14, 10–15, 13–15	Bronze

=== World Cup ===
Men's singles
Year	Venue	Opponent	Score	Result
1988	National Stadium; Bangkok, Thailand	(China) Yang Yang	13–15, 6–15	Bronze

=== Asian Championships ===
Men's singles
Year	Venue	Opponent	Score	Result
1983	Shanghai, China	(China) Chen Changjie	15–11, 6–15, 15–18	Silver
1991	Cheras Indoor Stadium; Kuala Lumpur, Malaysia	(Malaysia) Foo Kok Keong	11–15, 13–15	Bronze

=== Southeast Asian Games ===
Men's singles
Year	Venue	Opponent	Score	Result
1985	Chulalongkorn University; Bangkok, Thailand	(Indonesia) Icuk Sugiarto	9–15, 6–15	Silver
1987	Kuningan Hall; Jakarta, Indonesia	(Indonesia) Icuk Sugiarto	13–15, 15–0, 9–15	Silver
1989	Stadium Negara; Kuala Lumpur, Malaysia	(Indonesia) Icuk Sugiarto	7–15, 10–15	Silver

=== International Tournaments ===
Men's singles
Year	Tournament	Opponent	Score	Result
1983	Penang Open	(Malaysia) Misbun Sidek	8–15, 5–15	(silver) Runner-up
1987	Indonesia Open	(China) Yang Yang	6–15, 8–15	(silver) Runner-up
1987	Singapore Open	(Malaysia) Misbun Sidek	13–15, 8–15	(silver) Runner-up
1987	Thailand Open	(China) Zhao Jianhua	10–15, 10–15	(silver) Runner-up
1987	World Grand Prix Finals	(China) Xiong Guobao	2–15, 14–18	(silver) Runner-up
1989	Singapore Open	(China) Zhao Jianhua	11–15, 8–15	(silver) Runner-up
1989	Chinese Taipei Open	(Denmark) Morten Frost	12–15, 3–15	(silver) Runner-up
1989	Dutch Open	(Indonesia) Alan Budikusuma	7–15, 12–15	(silver) Runner-up
1990	Indonesia Open	(Indonesia) Ardy Wiranata	10–15, 5–15	(silver) Runner-up
1990	Chinese Taipei Open	(Indonesia) Ardy Wiranata	18–17, 7–15, 15–11	(gold) Champion
1990	World Grand Prix Finals	(Malaysia) Rashid Sidek	18–13, 9–15, 15–2	(gold) Champion
1992	Australia Open	(Australia) Paul Stevenson	15–9, 15–11	(gold) Champion
