= Tan Sui Hoon =

Malaysian badminton player

Personal information
- Born: 5 December 1963 (age 62)
- Height: 1.71 m (5 ft 7 in)

Sport
- Country: Malaysia
- Sport: Badminton
- Handedness: Right
- Event: Doubles

Doubles
- BWF profile
Medal record
Women's badminton
Representing Malaysia
Asian Championships
Bronze medal – third place	1991 Kuala Lumpur	Mixed doubles
Bronze medal – third place	1992 Kuala Lumpur	Mixed doubles
Bronze medal – third place	1992 Kuala Lumpur	Women's doubles
Asian Cup
Bronze medal – third place	1991 Jakarta	Mixed doubles
Southeast Asian Games
Bronze medal – third place	1987 Jakarta	Women's team
Bronze medal – third place	1989 Kuala Lumpur	Women's doubles
Bronze medal – third place	1989 Kuala Lumpur	Mixed doubles
Bronze medal – third place	1989 Kuala Lumpur	Women's team
Bronze medal – third place	1991 Manila	Women's doubles
Bronze medal – third place	1991 Manila	Mixed doubles
Bronze medal – third place	1991 Manila	Women's team

Tan Sui Hoon (born 5 December 1963) is a former Malaysian badminton player. Tan won a bronze medal at the 1991 Asian championship in Mixed doubles and a bronze in Asian cup competition. In 1992 she medalled in both the doubles competition in Asian championship. She won a total of seven medals at the Southeast Asian games, which constitute one in 1987 and three medals in 1989 and 1991 respectively. She represented Malaysia in 1990 Commonwealth games and contested bronze medal fight in Women's doubles event with her partner Lim Siew Choon, against Denyse Julien and Johanne Falardeau of Canada. They eventually lost 13–18, 2–15 and settled for fourth position. Tan represented her country twice in World championships in 1989 and 1991.

== Achievements ==
=== Asian Championships ===
Women's doubles
Year	Venue	Partner	Opponent	Score	Result
1992	Cheras Indoor Stadium, Kuala Lumpur, Malaysia	(Malaysia) Tan Lee Wai	(China) Pan Li (China) Wu Yuhong	6–15, 5–15	Bronze

Mixed doubles
Year	Venue	Partner	Opponent	Score	Result
1991	Cheras Indoor Stadium, Kuala Lumpur, Malaysia	(Malaysia) Tan Kim Her	(South Korea) Park Joo-bong (South Korea) Chung Myung-hee	3–15, 4–15	Bronze
1992	Cheras Indoor Stadium, Kuala Lumpur, Malaysia	(Malaysia) Tan Kim Her	(Indonesia) Joko Mardianto (Indonesia) Sri Untari	6–15, 4–15	Bronze

=== Asian Cup ===
Mixed doubles
Year	Venue	Partner	Opponent	Score	Result
1991	Istora Senayan, Jakarta, Indonesia	(Malaysia) Ong Ewe Chye	(South Korea) Shon Jin-hwan (South Korea) Gil Young-ah	4–15, 4–15	Bronze

=== Southeast Asian Games ===
Women's doubles
Year	Venue	Partner	Opponent	Score	Result
1989	Stadium Negara, Kuala Lumpur, Malaysia	(Malaysia) Tan Lee Wai	(Indonesia) Verawaty Fadjrin (Indonesia) Yanti Kusmiati	12–15, 9–15	Bronze
1991	Camp Crame Gymnasium, Manila, Philippines	(Malaysia) Tan Lee Wai	(Indonesia) Finarsih (Indonesia) Lili Tampi	10–15, 4–15	Bronze

Mixed doubles
Year	Venue	Partner	Opponent	Score	Result
1989	Stadium Negara, Kuala Lumpur, Malaysia	(Malaysia) Cheah Soon Kit	(Indonesia) Aryono Miranat (Indonesia) Minarti Timur	14–18, 1–15	Bronze
1991	Camp Crame Gymnasium, Manila, Philippines	(Malaysia) Ong Ewe Chye	(Indonesia) Rexy Mainaky (Indonesia) Erma Sulistianingsih	5–15, 5–15	Bronze
