= Joko Mardianto =

Indonesian badminton player

Sport
- Sport: Badminton
- BWF profile
Medal record
Men's badminton
Representing Indonesia
Asian Championships
Gold medal – first place	1992 Kuala Lumpur	Mixed doubles
SEA Games
Silver medal – second place	1989 Kuala Lumpur	Men's team
Bronze medal – third place	1989 Kuala Lumpur	Men's doubles

Joko Mardianto (born 1965) is a former Indonesian badminton player in the late 1980s to early 1990s.

== Profile ==
Joko Mardianto is a doubles specialist, namely men's doubles and mixed doubles. At the 1989 SEA Games, Mardianto won a bronze medal in the men's doubles with Aryono Miranat and a silver medal for the men's team. His brilliant career continued after successfully winning the mixed doubles number with Sri Untari at the 1992 Asian Badminton Championships.

== Achievements ==
=== Asian Championships ===
Mixed doubles
Year	Tournament	Partner	Opponent	Score	Result
1992	Cheras Indoor Stadium, Kuala Lumpur, Malaysia	(Indonesia) Sri Untari	(Hong Kong) Chan Siu Kwong (Hong Kong) Chung Hoi Yuk	15–10, 14–17, 15–7	Gold

=== SEA Games ===
Men's doubles
Year	Venue	Partner	Opponent	Score	Result
1989	Stadium Negara; Kuala Lumpur, Malaysia	(Indonesia) Aryono Miranat	(Malaysia) Jalani Sidek (Malaysia) Razif Sidek	1–15, 8–15	Bronze

=== IBF World Grand Prix ===
The World Badminton Grand Prix sanctioned by International Badminton Federation (IBF) from 1983 to 2006.

Men's doubles
Year	Tournament	Partner	Opponent	Score	Result
1994	Brunei Open	(Indonesia) Paulus Firman	(Indonesia) Cun Cun Haryono (Indonesia) Victo Wibowo	10–15, 7–15	(silver) Runner-up

=== IBF International ===
Men's doubles
Year	Tournament	Partner	Opponent	Score	Result
1993	Brunei Open	(Indonesia) Herly Djaenudin	(Thailand) Pramote Teerawiwatana (Thailand) Sakrapee Thongsari	5–15, 15–4, 6–15	(silver) Runner-up
