= Ladawan Mulasartsatorn =

Thai badminton player (born 1970)

Personal information
- Born: 18 March 1970 (age 55)

Sport
- Country: Thailand
- Sport: Badminton
Medal record
Women's badminton
Representing Thailand
Asian Championships
Silver medal – second place	1992 Kuala Lumpur	Women's doubles
Asian Cup
Bronze medal – third place	1991 Jakarta	Mixed doubles
SEA Games
Silver medal – second place	1985 Bangkok	Women's team
Silver medal – second place	1987 Jakarta	Women's team
Silver medal – second place	1989 Kuala Lumpur	Women's team
Silver medal – second place	1991 Manila	Women's team
Silver medal – second place	1993 Singapore	Women's team
Bronze medal – third place	1985 Bangkok	Women's singles
Bronze medal – third place	1987 Jakarta	Women's singles
Bronze medal – third place	1987 Jakarta	Women's doubles
Bronze medal – third place	1991 Manila	Women's doubles
Bronze medal – third place	1993 Singapore	Women's doubles
Bronze medal – third place	1993 Singapore	Mixed doubles

Ladawan Mulasartsatorn (born 18 March 1970) is a Thai badminton player. She competed in women's doubles at the 1992 Summer Olympics in Barcelona.
