= Siripong Siripool =

Thai badminton player (born 1965)

Personal information
- Country: Thailand
- Born: 9 September 1965 (age 59); Surin, Thailand
Medal record
Men's badminton
Representing Thailand
Asian Games
Silver medal – second place	1998 Bangkok	Men's doubles
Asian Cup
Bronze medal – third place	1991 Jakarta	Mixed doubles
Southeast Asian Games
Bronze medal – third place	1997 Jakarta	Men's doubles
Bronze medal – third place	1987 Jakarta	Men's team
Bronze medal – third place	1991 Manila	Men's team
Bronze medal – third place	1997 Jakarta	Men's team

Siripong Siripool (born 9 September 1965) is a Thai badminton coach and former player. He competed at the 1992 Summer Olympics and the 1996 Summer Olympics.
