= Rashid Sidek =

Malaysian badminton player

Datuk Rashid Sidek
Personal information
- Nickname: Adul
- Born: Abdul Rashid bin Mohd Sidek; 9 July 1968 (age 58) Banting, Selangor, Malaysia
- Years active: 1986–2000
- Height: 1.80 m (5 ft 11 in)
- Weight: 68 kg (150 lb; 10.7 st)

Sport
- Country: Malaysia
- Sport: Badminton
- Handedness: Right

Men's singles
- Highest ranking: 1 (1997)
- BWF profile
Medal record
Representing Malaysia
Men's badminton
Olympic Games
Bronze medal – third place	1996 Atlanta	Men's singles
World Cup
Bronze medal – third place	1993 New Delhi	Men's singles
Thomas Cup
Gold medal – first place	1992 Kuala Lumpur	Team
Silver medal – second place	1988 Kuala Lumpur	Team
Silver medal – second place	1990 Tokyo	Team
Silver medal – second place	1994 Jakarta	Team
Bronze medal – third place	1986 Jakarta	Team
Commonwealth Games
Gold medal – first place	1990 Auckland	Men's singles
Gold medal – first place	1994 Victoria	Men's singles
Silver medal – second place	1990 Auckland	Men's doubles
Silver medal – second place	1994 Victoria	Mixed team
Asian Games
Silver medal – second place	1990 Beijing	Men's team
Bronze medal – third place	1990 Beijing	Men's singles
Asian Championships
Gold medal – first place	1991 Kuala Lumpur	Men's singles
Gold medal – first place	1992 Kuala Lumpur	Men's singles
Bronze medal – third place	1989 Shanghai	Men's team
Asian Cup
Gold medal – first place	1991 Jakarta	Men's singles
Gold medal – first place	1996 Seoul	Men's singles
Southeast Asian Games
Gold medal – first place	1989 Kuala Lumpur	Men's team
Gold medal – first place	1991 Manila	Men's team
Silver medal – second place	1987 Jakarta	Men's team
Silver medal – second place	1995 Chiang Mai	Men's team
Silver medal – second place	1999 Bandar Seri Begawan	Men's team
Bronze medal – third place	1989 Kuala Lumpur	Men's singles
Bronze medal – third place	1991 Manila	Men's singles
Bronze medal – third place	1995 Chiang Mai	Men's singles

Abdul Rashid Mohd Sidek (born 9 July 1968) is a Malaysian former badminton player and coach.

== Personal life ==
He is the youngest of the famous five Sidek brothers. Rashid and his siblings gained exposure to badminton from their father, Mohd Sidek, a former player turned coach. Under the guidance of their father, Rashid and the rest of his siblings were trained to be champions from an early age. Additionally, Rashid was also an alumnus of Victoria Institution from the 1981–1986 batch.

== Career ==
After completing his Sijil Pelajaran Malaysia (SPM) exam, he was injected into the Project 1988/90 squad with the aim of regaining the Thomas Cup. In the 1990 Thomas Cup, Rashid played well but Malaysia lost the finals to China 1–4.

He won the Malaysian Open title for three consecutive years in 1990, 1991, and 1992. As a result, he became known by many as “jaguh kampung” (literally, "local hero"). In the Thomas Cup final in 1992, he beat Ardy Wiranata to give Malaysia the first point in a dramatic 3–2 win over rivals Indonesia - the first championship won by Malaysia in 25 years, and the last to this day.

Over the next three years, Rashid's performance declined, but he bounced back in 1996, when he won the Asia Cup and German Open, then reached the finals of the All England before losing to Paul-Erik Hoyer Larsen from Denmark. His ranking rose to among the top three in the world. He won the bronze medal at the 1996 Atlanta Olympics, beating the top seed, Joko Suprianto of Indonesia en route to the semi-finals, where he was beaten by Dong Jiong. However, he beat Indonesia's 1995 world champion, Heryanto Arbi, 5-15, 15-11, 15–6 in the third place playoff.

In 1997, Rashid reached the top of the world ranking. He later began to make way for new generation players like Wong Choong Hann, Yong Hock Kin and Roslin Hashim.

He retired in 2000, when aged only 32, to make way for younger and new generation players.

== Coaching ==
Upon his retirement, Rashid was appointed as national coach by the Badminton Association of Malaysia from 2003 until 2015. He became instrumental for the success of the new generation badminton players such as Daren Liew and Chong Wei Feng. Apart from that, he was a coach for Nusa Mahsuri, the first professional badminton club in Malaysia from 1996 to 2002. Currently, he acts as the advisor for the club which he had set up with his brother, Jalani.

He also became national para-badminton coach, serving as Cheah Liek Hou's coach who won the first ever gold medal in para-badminton at 2020 Summer Paralympics in Tokyo.

== Achievements ==
=== Olympic Games ===
Men's singles
Year	Venue	Opponent	Score	Result
1996	GSU Sports Arena, Atlanta, United States	(Indonesia) Hariyanto Arbi	5–15, 15–11, 15–6	Bronze

=== World Cup ===
Men's singles
Year	Venue	Opponent	Score	Result
1993	Indira Gandhi Arena, New Delhi, India	(Indonesia) Joko Suprianto	9–15, 3–15	Bronze

=== Asian Games ===
Men's singles
Year	Venue	Opponent	Score	Result
1990	Beijing Gymnasium, Beijing, China	(China) Zhao Jianhua	2–15, 5–15	Bronze

=== Asian Championships ===
Men's singles
Year	Venue	Opponent	Score	Result
1991	Cheras Indoor Stadium, Kuala Lumpur, Malaysia	(Malaysia) Foo Kok Keong	4–15, 15–11, 15–2	Gold
1992	Cheras Indoor Stadium, Kuala Lumpur, Malaysia	(Malaysia) Foo Kok Keong	15–9, 15–3	Gold

=== Asian Cup ===
Men's singles
Year	Venue	Opponent	Score	Result
1991	Istora Senayan, Jakarta, Indonesia	(Indonesia) Bambang Suprianto	15–10, 15–11	Gold
1996	Olympic Gymnasium No. 2, Seoul, South Korea	(China) Luo Yigang	18–14, 15–5	Gold

=== Southeast Asian Games ===
Men's singles
Year	Venue	Opponent	Score	Result
1989	Stadium Negara, Kuala Lumpur, Malaysia	(Indonesia) Eddy Kurniawan	10–15, 7–15	Bronze
1991	Camp Crame Gymnasium, Manila, Philippines	(Indonesia) Joko Suprianto	10–15, 9–15	Bronze
1995	Gymnasium 3, 700th Anniversary Sport Complex, Chiang Mai, Thailand	(Indonesia) Ardy Wiranata	11–15, 10–15	Bronze

=== Commonwealth Games ===
Men's singles
Year	Venue	Opponent	Score	Result
1990	Auckland Badminton Hall, Auckland, New Zealand	(Malaysia) Foo Kok Keong	15–8, 15–10	Gold
1994	McKinnon Gym, University of Victoria, British Columbia, Canada	(Malaysia) Ong Ewe Hock	15–6, 15–4	Gold

Men's doubles
Year	Venue	Partner	Opponent	Score	Result
1990	Auckland Badminton Hall, Auckland, New Zealand	(Malaysia) Cheah Soon Kit	(Malaysia) Razif Sidek (Malaysia) Jalani Sidek	8–15, 8–15	Silver

=== IBF World Grand Prix ===
The World Badminton Grand Prix sanctioned by International Badminton Federation (IBF) from 1983 to 2006.

Men's singles
Year	Tournament	Opponent	Score	Result
1990	French Open	(Malaysia) Foo Kok Keong	11–15, 13–18	(silver) Runner-up
1990	Malaysia Open	(Malaysia) Foo Kok Keong	18–17, 15–6	(gold) Winner
1990	World Grand Prix Finals	(Indonesia) Eddy Kurniawan	13–18, 15–9, 2–15	(silver) Runner-up
1991	Malaysia Open	(Malaysia) Foo Kok Keong	15–4, 15–5	(gold) Winner
1992	Malaysia Open	(Denmark) Thomas Stuer Lauridsen	15–5, 15–7	(gold) Winner
1992	World Grand Prix Finals	(Indonesia) Alan Budikusuma	15–9, 5–15, 15–7	(gold) Winner
1994	Malaysia Open	(Indonesia) Joko Suprianto	3–15, 5–15	(silver) Runner-up
1995	Brunei Open	(Indonesia) Jeffer Rosobin	15–9, 15–3	(gold) Winner
1996	Chinese Taipei Open	(China) Dong Jiong	11–15, 4–15	(silver) Runner-up
1996	All England Open	(Denmark) Poul-Erik Høyer Larsen	7–15, 6–15	(silver) Runner-up
1996	German Open	(Malaysia) Ong Ewe Hock	15–11, 15–2	(gold) Winner
1999	Chinese Taipei Open	(Chinese Taipei) Fung Permadi	17–16, 6–15, 7–15	(silver) Runner-up
2000	Korea Open	(Denmark) Peter Gade	11–15, 3–15	(silver) Runner-up

Men's doubles
Year	Tournament	Partner	Opponent	Score	Result
1988	Thailand Open	(Malaysia) Razif Sidek	(China) Li Yongbo (China) Tian Bingyi	3–15, 5–15	(silver) Runner-up

== Fictionalized portrayals ==
Rashid was portrayed by Farid Kamil, a biopic film by Adrian Teh entitle Gold is a journey story Paralympic badminton athlete Lien Hou and Rashid as coach train him for Olympic Tokyo 2020.

== Filmography ==
=== Film ===
Year	Title	Role	Notes
1994	Black Widow Wajah Ayu	Assassin 1	Special appearance
2002	Cinta 200 Ela	Yazid	
2021	Olympic Dream	Himself	Special appearance

=== Television ===
Year	Title	Role	TV channel
2022	Master in the House Malaysia	Himself/Master	TV3
2025	Projek Bapak Bapak S4	Himself	Astro Ria

== Honours ==
- Malaysia:
  - Herald of the Order of Loyalty to the Royal Family of Malaysia (B.S.D.) (1988)
  - Medal of the Order of the Defender of the Realm (P.P.N.) (1990)
  - Officer of the Order of the Defender of the Realm (K.M.N.) (1992)
- Federal Territory:
  - Commander of the Order of the Territorial Crown (P.M.W.) – Datuk (2021)
- Selangor:
  - Companion of the Order of the Crown of Selangor (S.M.S.) (1993)

== See also ==
- Misbun Sidek
- Razif Sidek
- Jalani Sidek
- Rahman Sidek
