= Lili Tampi =

Indonesian badminton player (born 1970)

Personal information
- Born: 19 May 1970 (age 56) Tasikmalaya, West Java, Indonesia
- Height: 1.61 m (5 ft 3 in)

Sport
- Country: Indonesia
- Sport: Badminton
- Handedness: Right
- Event: Women's doubles

Women's doubles
- BWF profile
Medal record
Women's badminton
Representing Indonesia
World Championships
Silver medal – second place	1995 Lausanne	Women's doubles
World Cup
Gold medal – first place	1994 Ho Chi Minh	Women's doubles
Silver medal – second place	1995 Jakarta	Women's doubles
Bronze medal – third place	1993 New Delhi	Women's doubles
Sudirman Cup
Silver medal – second place	1991 Copenhagen	Mixed team
Silver medal – second place	1993 Birmingham	Mixed team
Silver medal – second place	1995 Lausanne	Mixed team
Uber Cup
Gold medal – first place	1994 Jakarta	Women's team
Gold medal – first place	1996 Hong Kong	Women's team
Bronze medal – third place	1992 Kuala Lumpur	Women's team
Asian Games
Silver medal – second place	1990 Beijing	Women's team
Silver medal – second place	1994 Hiroshima	Women's team
Bronze medal – third place	1990 Beijing	Women's doubles
Asian Championships
Gold medal – first place	1996 Surabaya	Mixed doubles
Asian Cup
Bronze medal – third place	1995 Qingdao	Women's doubles
SEA Games
Gold medal – first place	1991 Manila	Women's team
Gold medal – first place	1993 Singapore	Women's doubles
Gold medal – first place	1993 Singapore	Women's team
Gold medal – first place	1995 Chiang Mai	Women's doubles
Gold medal – first place	1995 Chiang Mai]	Women's team
Silver medal – second place	1991 Manila	Women's doubles
Southeast Asian Junior Championships
Gold medal – first place	1986 Singapore	Girls' doubles
Gold medal – first place	1986 Singapore	Girls' team

Lili Tampi (born 19 May 1970) is an Indonesian retired badminton player who specialized in doubles.

== Career ==
Tampi won mixed doubles at the 1996 Asian Championships with Tri Kusharjanto, however most of her titles came in women's doubles with her regular partner Finarsih. These included the Dutch Open (1993), the World Badminton Grand Prix (1993), the Indonesia (1993, 1994), the Chinese Taipei Open (1994), and the Badminton World Cup (1994). Tampi and Finarsih were silver medalists at the 1995 IBF World Championships in Lausanne, Switzerland. They were eliminated in the quarterfinals of the 1992 Olympic Games competition in Barcelona, Spain, and in the round of sixteen at the 1996 Olympics in Atlanta, Georgia, USA.

Tampi's most significant badminton accomplishment, however, came in Uber Cup (international women's team) competition. In both the 1994 and 1996 editions of this biennial event, she and Finarsih won their critical final round match, helping to lift Indonesia to unexpected victories over long dominant China.

== Achievements ==
=== World Championships ===
Women's doubles
Year	Venue	Partner	Opponent	Score	Result
1995	Malley Sports Centre, Lausanne, Switzerland	(Indonesia) Finarsih	(South Korea) Jang Hye-ock (South Korea) Gil Young-ah	15–3, 11–15, 10–15	Silver

=== World Cup ===
Women's doubles
Year	Venue	Partner	Opponent	Score	Result
1993	Indira Gandhi Arena; New Delhi, India	(Indonesia) Finarsih	(Sweden) Lim Xiaoqing (Sweden) Christine Magnusson	10–15, 3–15	Bronze
1994	Phan Đình Phùng Indoor Stadium; Ho Chi Minh, Vietnam	(Indonesia) Finarsih	(South Korea) Chung So-young (South Korea) Gil Young-ah	15–11, 15–12	Gold
1995	Istora Senayan; Jakarta, Indonesia	(Indonesia) Finarsih	(Indonesia) Eliza Nathanael (Indonesia) Zelin Resiana	15–10, 11–15, 11–10 retired	Silver

=== Asian Games ===
Women's doubles
Year	Venue	Partner	Opponent	Score	Result
1990	Beijing Gymnasium, Beijing, China	(Indonesia) Verawaty Fadjrin	(China) Guan Weizhen (China) Nong Qunhua	8–15, 4–15	Bronze

=== Asian Championships ===
Mixed doubles
Year	Venue	Partner	Opponent	Score	Result
1996	GOR Pancasila; Surabaya, Indonesia	(Indonesia) Tri Kusharjanto	(South Korea) Kang Kyung-jin (South Korea) Kim Mee-hyang	15–1, 15–6	Gold

=== Asian Cup ===
Women's doubles
Year	Venue	Partner	Opponent	Score	Result
1995	Xinxing Gymnasium, Qingdao, China	(Indonesia) Finarsih	(South Korea) Gil Young-ah (South Korea) Jang Hye-ock	6–15, 15–8, 7–15	Bronze

=== SEA Games ===
Women's doubles
Year	Venue	Partner	Opponent	Score	Result
1991	Camp Crame Gymnasium; Manila, Philippines	(Indonesia) Finarsih	(Indonesia) Erma Sulistianingsih (Indonesia) Rosiana Tendean	10–15, 10–15	Silver
1993	Singapore Badminton Hall; Singapore	(Indonesia) Finarsih	(Indonesia) Eliza Nathanael (Indonesia) Zelin Resiana	15–5, 6–15, 15–5	Gold
1995	Gymnasium 3, 700th Anniversary Sport Complex; Chiang Mai, Thailand	(Indonesia) Finarsih	(Indonesia) Eliza Nathanael (Indonesia) Zelin Resiana	15–7, 15–3	Gold

=== IBF World Grand Prix (6 titles, 5 runners-up) ===
The World Badminton Grand Prix was sanctioned by the International Badminton Federation from 1983 to 2006.

Women's doubles
Year	Tournament	Partner	Opponent	Score	Result
1991	Denmark Open	(Indonesia) Finarsih	(England) Gillian Gowers (Denmark) Nettie Nielsen	7–15, 6–15	(silver) Runner-up
1993	Japan Open	(Indonesia) Finarsih	(South Korea) Chung So-young (South Korea) Gil Young-ah	12–15, 5–15	(silver) Runner-up
1993	Indonesia Open	(Indonesia) Finarsih	(Indonesia) Eliza Nathanael (Indonesia) Zelin Resiana	17–16, 15–12	(gold) Winner
1993	German Open	(Indonesia) Finarsih	(China) Chen Ying (China) Wu Yuhong	15–3, 15–10	(gold) Winner
1993	Dutch Open	(Indonesia) Finarsih	(England) Joanne Goode (China) Zhang Ning	15–9, 15–3	(gold) Winner
1993	World Grand Prix Finals	(Indonesia) Finarsih	(Indonesia) Eliza Nathanael (Indonesia) Rosiana Tendean	15–11, 15–10	(gold) Winner
1994	Chinese Taipei Open	(Indonesia) Finarsih	(Denmark) Lotte Olsen (Denmark) Lisbet Stuer-Lauridsen	15–9, 15–4	(gold) Winner
1994	Japan Open	(Indonesia) Finarsih	(South Korea) Chung So-young (South Korea) Gil Young-ah	11–15, 11–15	(silver) Runner-up
1994	Indonesia Open	(Indonesia) Finarsih	(South Korea) Chung So-young (South Korea) Gil Young-ah	10–15, 15–9, 15–5	(gold) Winner
1994	World Grand Prix Finals	(Indonesia) Finarsih	(China) Ge Fei (China) Gu Jun	15–13, 8–15, 7–15	(silver) Runner-up
1995	Japan Open	(Indonesia) Finarsih	(China) Ge Fei (China) Gu Jun	11–15, 8–15	(silver) Runner-up

IBF Grand Prix tournament
IBF Grand Prix Finals tournament
