= Foo Kok Keong =

Malaysian badminton player

Foo Kok Keong 傅国强
Personal information
- Born: 8 January 1963 (age 63) Gombak, Selangor, Federation of Malaya (now Malaysia)
- Years active: 1982–1994
- Height: 1.70 m (5 ft 7 in)
- Weight: 65 kg (143 lb)

Sport
- Country: Malaysia
- Sport: Badminton
- Handedness: Right

Men's singles
- Highest ranking: 1 (1991)
- BWF profile
Medal record
Men's badminton
Representing Malaysia
World Cup
Silver medal – second place	1989 Guangzhou	Men's singles
Bronze medal – third place	1992 Guangzhou	Men's singles
Thomas Cup
Gold medal – first place	1992 Kuala Lumpur	Team
Silver medal – second place	1988 Kuala Lumpur	Team
Silver medal – second place	1990 Tokyo	Team
Silver medal – second place	1994 Jakarta	Team
Bronze medal – third place	1986 Jakarta	Team
Commonwealth Games
Silver medal – second place	1990 Auckland	Men's singles
Asian Games
Silver medal – second place	1990 Beijing	Men's team
Asian Championships
Gold medal – first place	1994 Shanghai	Men's singles
Silver medal – second place	1985 Kuala Lumpur	Men's team
Silver medal – second place	1991 Kuala Lumpur	Men's singles
Silver medal – second place	1992 Kuala Lumpur	Men's singles
Bronze medal – third place	1989 Shanghai	Men's team
Bronze medal – third place	1993 Hong Kong	Men's team
Southeast Asian Games
Gold medal – first place	1989 Kuala Lumpur	Men's team
Gold medal – first place	1991 Manila	Men's team
Silver medal – second place	1983 Singapore	Men's team
Silver medal – second place	1985 Bangkok	Men's team
Silver medal – second place	1987 Jakarta	Men's team
Bronze medal – third place	1987 Jakarta	Men's singles
Bronze medal – third place	1989 Kuala Lumpur	Men's singles
Bronze medal – third place	1991 Manila	Men's singles

Foo Kok Keong
- Chinese: 傅國強
Transcriptions
Standard Mandarin
- Hanyu Pinyin: Fuguóqiáng

Datuk Foo Kok Keong PJN KMN AMN BSD PJK (born 8 January 1963) is a former badminton player from Malaysia who rated among the world's best singles players from the late 1980s to the mid-1990s. He competed at the 1992 Summer Olympics.

== Career ==
Not a stylish looking player, he was noted for his quickness, stamina, and never-say-die tenacity. Kok Keong played for the Malaysian Thomas Cup (men's international) team which finished second to China in 1990, and for the team which defeated Indonesia for the world championship in 1992.

His victories in individual competitions included the Singapore Open and French Open singles titles in 1990, and the Asian Championships singles title in 1994. He was a runner-up in the Malaysia Open (1990, 1991), the British Commonwealth Games (1990), the World Grand Prix Final (1989), and the All-England Championships (1991).

In 1991, Foo Kok Keong became the first Malaysian to reach the number 1 world ranking since the system was implemented by the International Badminton Federation (IBF) in the 1980s.

== Achievements ==
=== World Cup ===
Men's singles
Year	Venue	Opponent	Score	Result
1989	Guangzhou Gymnasium; Guangzhou, China	(China) Yang Yang	14–17, 6–15	Silver
1992	Guangdong Gymnasium; Guangzhou, China	(Indonesia) Joko Suprianto	12–15, 2–15	Bronze

=== Asian Championships ===
Men's singles
Year	Venue	Opponent	Score	Result
1991	Cheras Indoor Stadium; Kuala Lumpur, Malaysia	(Malaysia) Rashid Sidek	15–4, 11–15, 2–15	Silver
1992	Cheras Indoor Stadium; Kuala Lumpur, Malaysia	(Malaysia) Rashid Sidek	9–15, 3–15	Silver
1994	Shanghai Gymnasium; Shanghai, China	(China) Liu Jun	15–13, 9–15, 15–3	Gold

=== Southeast Asian Games ===
Men's singles
Year	Venue	Opponent	Score	Result
1987	Kuningan Hall; Jakarta, Indonesia	(Indonesia) Icuk Sugiarto	6–15, 4–15	Bronze
1989	Stadium Negara; Kuala Lumpur, Malaysia	(Indonesia) Icuk Sugiarto	12–15, 5–15	Bronze
1991	Camp Crame Gymnasium; Manila, Philippines	(Indonesia) Ardy Wiranata	4–15, 10–15	Bronze

=== Commonwealth Games ===
Men's singles
Year	Venue	Opponent	Score	Result
1990	Auckland Badminton Hall; Auckland, New Zealand	(Malaysia) Rashid Sidek	8–15, 10–15	Silver

=== IBF World Grand Prix ===
The World Badminton Grand Prix sanctioned by International Badminton Federation (IBF) from 1983 to 2006.

Men's singles
Year	Tournament	Opponent	Score	Result
1989	Japan Open	(China) Yang Yang	2–15, 10–15	(silver) Runner-up
1989	Hong Kong Open	(China) Wu Wenkai	11–15, 11–15	(silver) Runner-up
1989	World Grand Prix Finals	(China) Xiong Guobao	11–15, 7–15	(silver) Runner-up
1990	French Open	(Malaysia) Rashid Sidek	15–11, 18–13	(gold) Winner
1990	Malaysia Open	(Malaysia) Rashid Sidek	17–18, 6–15	(silver) Runner-up
1990	Singapore Open	(China) Zhao Jianhua	15–8, 10–15, 15–9	(gold) Winner
1991	All England Open	(Indonesia) Ardy Wiranata	12–15, 10–15	(silver) Runner-up
1991	Malaysia Open	(Malaysia) Rashid Sidek	4–15, 5–15	(silver) Runner-up

=== IBF International ===
Men's singles
Year	Tournament	Opponent	Score	Result
1990	Australian Open	(Indonesia) Ardy Wiranata	9–15, 12–15	(silver) Runner-up

=== Invitational tournament ===
Men's singles
Year	Tournament	Opponent	Score	Result
1988	Asian Invitational Championships; Bandar Lampung, Indonesia	(China) Xiong Guobao	9–15, 5–15	Silver

== Honours ==
- Malaysia:
  - Herald of the Order of Loyalty to the Royal Family of Malaysia (B.S.D.) (1988)
  - Member of the Order of the Defender of the Realm (A.M.N.) (1990)
  - Officer of the Order of the Defender of the Realm (K.M.N.) (1992)
  - Commander of the Order of Meritorious Service (P.J.N.) – Datuk (2022)
- Selangor:
  - Recipient of the Meritorious Service Medal (P.J.K.) (1991)
