= 1994 Thomas & Uber Cup squads =

This article lists the squads for the 1994 Thomas & Uber Cup participating teams. The age listed for each player is on 10 May 1994 which was the first day of the tournament.

== Thomas Cup ==
=== Group A ===
==== China ====
Nine players represented China in the 1994 Thomas Cup.

Name	DoB/Age
Liu Jun	9 November 1968 (aged 25)
Dong Jiong	20 August 1973 (aged 20)
Xie Yangchun	1 May 1974 (aged 20)
Sun Jun	16 June 1975 (aged 18)
Huang Zhanzhong	5 November 1968 (aged 25)
Jiang Xin	18 January 1969 (aged 25)
Chen Hongyong	1 May 1966 (aged 28)
Chen Kang	24 November 1965 (aged 28)
Yu Qi	3 June 1969 (aged 24)

==== Indonesia ====
Nine players represented Indonesia in the 1994 Thomas Cup.

Name	DoB/Age
Joko Suprianto	21 January 1966 (aged 28)
Hariyanto Arbi	27 January 1972 (aged 22)
Ardy Wiranata	10 February 1970 (aged 24)
Hermawan Susanto	24 September 1967 (aged 26)
Rudy Gunawan	31 December 1966 (aged 27)
Eddy Hartono	19 July 1964 (aged 29)
Rexy Mainaky	9 March 1968 (aged 26)
Ricky Subagja	27 January 1971 (aged 23)
Bambang Suprianto	20 February 1969 (aged 25)

==== Sweden ====
Nine players represented Sweden in the 1994 Thomas Cup.

Name	DoB/Age
Jens Olsson	15 December 1964 (aged 29)
Tomas Johansson	12 August 1969 (aged 24)
Patrik Andreasson	20 August 1966 (aged 27)
Henrik Bengtsson	9 October 1973 (aged 20)
Rickard Magnusson	10 January 1971 (aged 23)
Pär-Gunnar Jönsson	6 August 1963 (aged 30)
Peter Axelsson	22 June 1967 (aged 26)
Jan-Eric Antonsson	9 September 1961 (aged 32)
Mikael Rosén	29 March 1967 (aged 27)

==== Finland ====
Six players represented Finland in the 1994 Thomas Cup.

Name	DoB/Age
Robert Liljequist	27 January 1971 (aged 23)
Jyri Aalto	11 July 1969 (aged 24)
Lasse Lindelöf	8 May 1967 (aged 27)
Mikael Segercrantz	27 September 1974 (aged 19)
Tony Tuominen	4 January 1964 (aged 30)
Jari Eriksson	27 February 1965 (aged 29)

=== Group B ===
==== Denmark ====
Eight players represented Denmark in the 1994 Thomas Cup.

Name	DoB/Age
Thomas Stuer-Lauridsen	29 April 1971 (aged 23)
Poul-Erik Høyer Larsen	20 September 1965 (aged 28)
Peter Espersen	26 December 1968 (aged 25)
Søren B. Nielsen	22 February 1970 (aged 24)
Michael Søgaard	4 February 1969 (aged 25)
Jon Holst-Christensen	16 June 1968 (aged 25)
Jim Laugesen	10 November 1974 (aged 19)
Thomas Lund	2 August 1968 (aged 25)
~~Jens Eriksen~~	30 December 1969 (aged 24)
~~Christian Jakobsen~~	27 August 1971 (aged 22)

==== Malaysia ====
Seven players represented Malaysia in the 1994 Thomas Cup.

Name	DoB/Age
Rashid Sidek	8 July 1968 (aged 25)
Ong Ewe Hock	14 March 1972 (aged 22)
Foo Kok Keong	8 January 1963 (aged 31)
Cheah Soon Kit	9 January 1968 (aged 26)
Soo Beng Kiang	19 March 1968 (aged 26)
Tan Kim Her	11 November 1971 (aged 22)
Yap Kim Hock	2 August 1970 (aged 23)

==== South Korea ====
Eight players represented South Korea in the 1994 Thomas Cup.

Name	DoB/Age
Kim Hak-kyun	15 November 1971 (aged 22)
Park Sung-woo	22 August 1971 (aged 22)
Lee Gwang-jin	5 December 1970 (aged 23)
Ahn Jae-chang	1 October 1972 (aged 21)
Kim Dong-moon	22 September 1975 (aged 18)
Yoo Yong-sung	25 October 1974 (aged 19)
Lee Suk-ho	28 July 1973 (aged 20)
Choi Ji-tae	19 July 1972 (aged 21)

==== Thailand ====
Eight players represented Thailand in the 1994 Thomas Cup.

Name	DoB/Age
Sompol Kukasemkij	24 January 1963 (aged 31)
Kitipon Kitikul	9 September 1975 (aged 18)
Teeranun Chiangta	11 November 1972 (aged 21)
Vacharapan Khamthong	1966 (aged 27–28)
Pramote Teerawiwatana	14 June 1967 (aged 26)
Sakrapee Thongsari	23 June 1962 (aged 31)
Siripong Siripool	9 September 1965 (aged 28)
Khunakorn Sudhisodhi	29 March 1974 (aged 20)

== Uber Cup ==
=== Group A ===
==== China ====
Eight players represented China in the 1994 Uber Cup.

Name	DoB/Age
Ye Zhaoying	7 May 1974 (aged 20)
Han Jingna	16 January 1975 (aged 19)
Zhang Ning	19 May 1975 (aged 18)
Liu Yuhong	12 April 1973 (aged 21)
Chen Ying	1 December 1971 (aged 22)
Wu Yuhong	3 November 1966 (aged 27)
Ge Fei	9 October 1975 (aged 18)
Gu Jun	3 January 1975 (aged 19)

==== Japan ====
Nine players represented Japan in the 1994 Uber Cup.

Name	DoB/Age
Hisako Mizui	29 March 1972 (aged 22)
Takako Ida	13 December 1972 (aged 21)
Yasuko Mizui	19 September 1975 (aged 18)
Hisako Mori	4 May 1964 (aged 30)
Tomomi Matsuo	15 August 1968 (aged 25)
Kyoko Sasage	13 August 1969 (aged 24)
Tokiko Hirota	11 January 1967 (aged 27)
Yuko Koike	21 September 1967 (aged 26)
Senobu Sasaki	28 May 1970 (aged 23)

==== Russia ====
Six players represented Russia in the 1994 Uber Cup.

Name	DoB/Age
Marina Andrievskaya	20 November 1974 (aged 19)
Marina Yakusheva	19 June 1974 (aged 19)
Irina Yakusheva	19 June 1974 (aged 19)
Elena Denisova	1966 (aged 27–28)
Svetlana Alferova	1975 (aged 18–19)
Nadezhda Chervyakova	1970 (aged 23–24)

==== South Korea ====
Eight players represented South Korea in the 1994 Uber Cup.

Name	DoB/Age
Bang Soo-hyun	13 September 1972 (aged 21)
Kim Ji-hyun	10 September 1974 (aged 19)
Ra Kyung-min	25 November 1976 (aged 17)
Lee Joo-hyun	13 March 1974 (aged 20)
Chung So-young	20 February 1967 (aged 27)
Gil Young-ah	10 June 1970 (aged 23)
Jang Hye-ock	9 February 1977 (aged 17)
Shim Eun-jung	8 June 1971 (aged 22)

=== Group B ===
==== Denmark ====
Eight players represented Denmark in the 1994 Uber Cup.

Name	DoB/Age
Camilla Martin	23 March 1974 (aged 20)
Pernille Nedergaard	5 December 1967 (aged 26)
Mette Pedersen	30 September 1973 (aged 20)
Lotte Thomsen	22 November 1972 (aged 21)
Lotte Olsen	23 November 1966 (aged 27)
Lisbet Stuer-Lauridsen	22 September 1968 (aged 25)
Anne-Mette Bille	22 April 1968 (aged 26)
Marlene Thomsen	5 May 1971 (aged 23)

==== Indonesia ====
Nine players represented Indonesia in the 1994 Uber Cup.

Name	DoB/Age
Susi Susanti	11 February 1971 (aged 23)
Yuni Kartika	16 June 1973 (aged 20)
Yuliani Santosa	29 October 1971 (aged 22)
Mia Audina	22 August 1979 (aged 14)
Eliza Nathanael	27 May 1973 (aged 20)
Zelin Resiana	9 July 1972 (aged 21)
Finarsih	8 February 1972 (aged 22)
Lili Tampi	19 May 1970 (aged 23)
Rosiana Tendean	25 August 1964 (aged 29)

==== Sweden ====
Six players represented Sweden in the 1994 Uber Cup.

Name	DoB/Age
Lim Xiaoqing	15 August 1967 (aged 26)
Catrine Bengtsson	21 September 1969 (aged 24)
Christine Magnusson	21 November 1964 (aged 29)
Karolina Ericsson	5 June 1973 (aged 20)
Kristin Nilsson	1975 (aged 18–19)
Maria Bengtsson	5 March 1964 (aged 30)
~~Margit Borg~~	15 June 1969 (aged 24)
~~Astrid Crabo~~	10 July 1971 (aged 22)

==== Thailand ====
Five players represented Thailand in the 1994 Uber Cup.

Name	DoB/Age
Somharuthai Jaroensiri	15 November 1971 (aged 22)
Pornsawan Plungwech	15 January 1973 (aged 21)
Sujitra Ekmongkolpaisarn	17 June 1977 (aged 16)
Piyathip Sansaniyakulvilai	23 October 1972 (aged 21)
Plernta Boonyarit	22 March 1970 (aged 24)
