= Badminton at the 1994 Asian Games – Men's doubles =

Men's doubles at the 1994 Asian Games
- Venue: Tsuru Memorial Gymnasium
- Dates: 11–15 October
- Competitors: 36 from 10 nations

Medalists
gold medal	Rexy Mainaky; Ricky Subagja	Indonesia
silver medal	Cheah Soon Kit; Soo Beng Kiang	Malaysia
bronze medal	Chen Kang; Chen Hongyong	China
bronze medal	Jiang Xin; Huang Zhanzhong	China

The badminton men's doubles tournament at the 1994 Asian Games in Hiroshima took place from 11 October to 15 October at Tsuru Memorial Gymnasium.

== Schedule ==
All times are Japan Standard Time (UTC+09:00)

Date	Time	Event
Tuesday, 11 October 1994	13:00	1st round
Wednesday, 12 October 1994	13:00	2nd round
Thursday, 13 October 1994	13:00	Quarterfinals
Friday, 14 October 1994	13:00	Semifinals
Saturday, 15 October 1994	13:00	Final

== Results ==
=== Final ===
Final
1	Rexy Mainaky (INA); Ricky Subagja (INA)	15	15
2	Cheah Soon Kit (MAS); Soo Beng Kiang (MAS)	10	2

=== Top half ===
1st round
Chhea Chhorvann (CAM); Ry Sokdom (CAM)	1	2
Takuya Katayama (JPN); Yuzo Kubota (JPN)	15	15

2nd round
1	Rexy Mainaky (INA); Ricky Subagja (INA)	15	15
Abdulla Shakeeb (MDV); Hassan Riyaz (MDV)	2	2
Kang Kyung-jin (KOR); Lee Suk-ho (KOR)	15	15
Siripong Siripool (THA); Khunakorn Sudhisodhi (THA)	3	10
3/4	Chen Kang (CHN); Chen Hongyong (CHN)	18	15
Horng Shin-jeng (TPE); Huang Chuan-chen (TPE)	17	7
Tan Kim Her (MAS); Yap Kim Hock (MAS)	15	15
Takuya Katayama (JPN); Yuzo Kubota (JPN)	4	8

Quarterfinals
1	Rexy Mainaky (INA); Ricky Subagja (INA)	15	15
Kang Kyung-jin (KOR); Lee Suk-ho (KOR)	3	1
3/4	Chen Kang (CHN); Chen Hongyong (CHN)	15	15
Tan Kim Her (MAS); Yap Kim Hock (MAS)	11	11

Semifinals
1	Rexy Mainaky (INA); Ricky Subagja (INA)	15	15
3/4	Chen Kang (CHN); Chen Hongyong (CHN)	5	10

=== Bottom half ===
1st round
Jiang Xin (CHN); Huang Zhanzhong (CHN)	15	15
Tan Sian Peng (SIN); Patrick Lau (SIN)	7	7

2nd round
Jiang Xin (CHN); Huang Zhanzhong (CHN)	15	15
Ha Tae-kwon (KOR); Yoo Yong-sung (KOR)	11	11
Yang Shih-jeng (TPE); Kuo Hsin-ming (TPE)	4	2
3/4	Sakrapee Thongsari (THA); Pramote Teerawiwatana (THA)	15	15
Shuji Matsuno (JPN); Shinji Matsuura (JPN)	15	15
Mohamed Sharath (MDV); Moosa Nashid (MDV)	3	3
Bambang Suprianto (INA); Hermawan Susanto (INA)	5	2
2	Cheah Soon Kit (MAS); Soo Beng Kiang (MAS)	15	15

Quarterfinals
Jiang Xin (CHN); Huang Zhanzhong (CHN)	15	7	15
3/4	Sakrapee Thongsari (THA); Pramote Teerawiwatana (THA)	11	15	9
Shuji Matsuno (JPN); Shinji Matsuura (JPN)	13	15	3
2	Cheah Soon Kit (MAS); Soo Beng Kiang (MAS)	15	5	15

Semifinals
Jiang Xin (CHN); Huang Zhanzhong (CHN)	9	5
2	Cheah Soon Kit (MAS); Soo Beng Kiang (MAS)	15	15
