= Badminton at the 1994 Asian Games – Men's team =

Men's team at the 1994 Asian Games
- Venue: Tsuru Memorial Gymnasium
- Dates: 7–9 October
- Competitors: 58 from 8 nations

Medalists
gold medal	Indonesia; Hariyanto Arbi, Rudy Gunawan, Rexy Mainaky, Ricky Subagja, Bambang Suprianto, Joko Suprianto, Hermawan Susanto, Ardy Wiranata
silver medal	South Korea; Ahn Jae-chang, Ha Tae-kwon, Kang Kyung-jin, Kim Hak-kyun, Lee Kwang-jin, Lee Suk-ho, Park Sung-woo, Yoo Yong-sung
bronze medal	China; Chen Hongyong, Chen Kang, Chen Xingdong, Dong Jiong, Huang Zhanzhong, Jiang Xin, Lin Liwen, Liu Jianjun
bronze medal	Malaysia; Cheah Soon Kit, Muralidesan Krishnamurthy, Ong Ewe Hock, Pang Chen, Soo Beng Kiang, Tan Kim Her, Yap Kim Hock

The Badminton men's team event at the 1994 Asian Games was scheduled from 7 to 9 October 1994 at Tsuru Memorial Gymnasium, Hiroshima.

== Schedule ==
All times are Japan Standard Time (UTC+09:00)

Date	Time	Event
Friday, 7 October 1994	13:00	Quarterfinals
Saturday, 8 October 1994	15:00	Semifinals
Sunday, 9 October 1994	15:00	Final

== Results ==
Quarterfinals
1	Indonesia	5
Thailand	0
3/4	China	5
Japan	0
Chinese Taipei	1
3/4	South Korea	4
Maldives	0
2	Malaysia	5

Semifinals
1	Indonesia	5
3/4	China	0
3/4	South Korea	3
2	Malaysia	2

Final
1	Indonesia	5
3/4	South Korea	0

=== Quarterfinals ===
7 October	Indonesia	5–0	Thailand

Ardy Wiranata	2–0	Sompol Kukasemkij	15–9, 15–7
Joko Suprianto	2–1	Vacharapan Kumthong	18–17, 13–18, 15–5
Rexy Mainaky / Ricky Subagja	2–0	Pramote Teerawiwatana / Sakrapee Thongsari	15–6, 18–13
Rudy Gunawan / Bambang Suprianto	2–0	Siripong Siripool / Khunakorn Sudhisodhi	15–9, 15–12
Hariyanto Arbi	2–0	Teeranun Chiangta	15–8, 15–1

7 October	China	5–0	Japan

Dong Jiong	2–0	Fumihiko Machida	15–9, 15–2
Lin Liwen	2–0	Takahiro Suka	15–8, 15–10
Chen Hongyong / Chen Kang	2–1	Shuji Matsuno / Shinji Matsuura	15–5, 17–18, 15–7
Huang Zhanzhong / Jiang Xin	2–0	Takuya Katayama / Yuzo Kubota	15–2, 15–6
Liu Jianjun	2–0	Kazuhiro Honda	15–11, 18–14

7 October	Chinese Taipei	1–4	South Korea

Lee Mou-chou	0–2	Park Sung-woo	6–15, 8–15
Lin Wei-chen	0–2	Kim Hak-kyun	4–15, 7–15
Kuo Hsin-ming / Yang Shih-jeng	0–2	Ha Tae-kwon / Yoo Yong-sung	7–15, 5–15
Horng Shin-jeng / Huang Chuan-chen	2–0	Kang Kyung-jin / Lee Kwang-jin	15–13, 15–8
Liu En-houng	0–2	Ahn Jae-chang	10–15, 6–15

7 October	Maldives	0–5	Malaysia

Mohamed Sharath	0–2	Ong Ewe Hock	4–15, 4–15
Abdulla Shakeeb	0–2	Muralidesan Krishnamurthy	1–15, 2–15
Moosa Nashid / Mohamed Sharath	0–2	Cheah Soon Kit / Soo Beng Kiang	5–15, 1–15
Hassan Riyaz / Abdulla Shakeeb	0–2	Tan Kim Her / Yap Kim Hock	2–15, 5–15
Moosa Nashid	0–2	Pang Chen	1–15, 5–15

=== Semifinals ===
8 October	Indonesia	5–0	China

Ardy Wiranata	2–0	Dong Jiong	15–10, 15–1
Joko Suprianto	2–1	Lin Liwen	10–15, 15–0, 15–7
Rexy Mainaky / Ricky Subagja	2–0	Chen Hongyong / Chen Kang	15–9, 15–6
Rudy Gunawan / Bambang Suprianto	2–1	Huang Zhanzhong / Jiang Xin	15–12, 9–15, 15–7
Hariyanto Arbi	2–0	Liu Jianjun	15–9, 15–6

8 October	South Korea	3–2	Malaysia

Park Sung-woo	2–0	Ong Ewe Hock	15–3, 15–3
Kim Hak-kyun	2–0	Muralidesan Krishnamurthy	15–6, 15–7
Lee Suk-ho / Yoo Yong-sung	0–2	Cheah Soon Kit / Soo Beng Kiang	6–15, 5–15
Ha Tae-kwon / Kang Kyung-jin	1–2	Tan Kim Her / Yap Kim Hock	13–15, 15–13, 9–15
Lee Kwang-jin	2–0	Pang Chen	15–12, 15–12

=== Final ===
9 October	Indonesia	5–0	South Korea

Ardy Wiranata	2–0	Park Sung-woo	15–8, 15–10
Joko Suprianto	2–1	Kim Hak-kyun	11–15, 15–5, 15–8
Rexy Mainaky / Ricky Subagja	2–0	Ha Tae-kwon / Yoo Yong-sung	15–2, 15–8
Rudy Gunawan / Bambang Suprianto	2–1	Kang Kyung-jin / Lee Suk-ho	10–15, 18–14, 15–10
Hariyanto Arbi	2–0	Ahn Jae-chang	15–3, 15–4

== Non-participating athletes ==
- Chen Xingdong (CHN)
- Hermawan Susanto (INA)
- Seiichi Watanabe (JPN)
- Chang Jeng-shyuang (TPE)
