= Yap Yee Guan =

Malaysian badminton player and coach

Yap Yee Guan 叶贻愿
Personal information
- Born: 20 February 1970 (age 56)
- Years active: 1988–1996
- Height: 1.71 m (5 ft 7 in)
- Weight: 65 kg (143 lb)

Sport
- Country: Malaysia
- Sport: Badminton
- Handedness: Right

Men's doubles
- Highest ranking: 5 (1995)
Medal record
Representing Malaysia
Men's badminton
World Cup
| Bronze medal – third place | 1992 Guangzhou | Men's doubles |
Asian Championships
| Bronze medal – third place | 1993 Hong Kong | Men's team |

Yap Yee Guan (born 20 February 1970) is a former badminton player from Malaysia and coach. He is the twin brother of Yap Yee Hup.

== Achievements ==
=== World Cup ===
Men's doubles
| Year | Venue | Partner | Opponent | Score | Result |
|---|---|---|---|---|---|
| 1992 | Guangdong Gymnasium; Guangzhou, China | (Malaysia) Yap Yee Hup | (Malaysia) Cheah Soon Kit (Malaysia) Soo Beng Kiang | 3–15, 14–17 | Bronze |

=== IBF World Grand Prix ===
The World Badminton Grand Prix sanctioned by International Badminton Federation (IBF) from 1983 to 2006.

Men's doubles
| Year | Tournament | Partner | Opponent | Score | Result |
|---|---|---|---|---|---|
| 1994 | Canadian Open | (Malaysia) Yap Yee Hup | (Indonesia) Candra Wijaya (Indonesia) Ade Sutrisna | 10–15, 12–15 | (silver) Runner-up |
| 1994 | U.S. Open | (Malaysia) Yap Yee Hup | (Indonesia) Candra Wijaya (Indonesia) Ade Sutrisna | 8–15, 14–15 | (silver) Runner-up |
| 1995 | Chinese Taipei Open | (Malaysia) Yap Yee Hup | (Indonesia) Denny Kantono (Indonesia) Antonius Ariantho | 7–15, 18–14, 2–15 | (silver) Runner-up |

=== IBF International ===
Men's doubles
| Year | Tournament | Partner | Opponent | Score | Result |
|---|---|---|---|---|---|
| 1990 | Polish International | (Malaysia) Yap Yee Hup | (Denmark) Thomas Stuer-Lauridsen (Denmark) Christian Jakobsen | 10–15, 15–12, 5–15 | (silver) Runner-up |
| 1991 | French Open | (Malaysia) Yap Yee Hup | (Malaysia) Tan Kim Her (Malaysia) Yap Kim Hock | 15–7, 15–11 | (gold) Winner |
| 1992 | Brunei Open | (Malaysia) Yap Yee Hup | (Indonesia) Aras Razak (Indonesia) Reony Mainaky | 15–10, 1–15, 17–18 | (silver) Runner-up |
