= Shon Jin-hwan =

South Korean badminton player

Personal information
- Born: 30 September 1968 (age 58)

Sport
- Country: South Korea
- Sport: Badminton
Medal record
Men's badminton
Representing South Korea
Sudirman Cup
Gold medal – first place	1993 Birmingham	Mixed team
Thomas Cup
Bronze medal – third place	1992 Kuala Lumpur	Men's team
Asian Games
Bronze medal – third place	1990 Beijing	Men's team
Asian Championships
Bronze medal – third place	1989 Shanghai	Men's team
Asian Cup
Gold medal – first place	1991 Jakarta	Mixed doubles

- Shon Jin-hwan
- Hangul: 손진환
- Hanja: 孫振煥
- RR: Son Jinhwan
- MR: Son Chinhwan

Shon Jin-hwan (born 30 September 1968) is a retired male badminton player from South Korea.

== Career ==
Shon attended Hannam University. He competed in badminton at the 1992 Summer Olympics in men's doubles with Lee Sang-bok. They lost in quarterfinals to Eddy Hartono and Rudy Gunawan, of Indonesia, 15-4, 18-15.

== Achievements ==
=== Asian Cup ===
Mixed doubles
Year	Venue	Partner	Opponent	Score	Result
1991	Istora Senayan, Jakarta, Indonesia	(South Korea) Gil Young-ah	(Indonesia) Aryono Miranat (Indonesia) Eliza Nathanael	15–5, 8–15, 15–7	Gold

=== IBF World Grand Prix ===
The World Badminton Grand Prix sanctioned by International Badminton Federation (IBF) from 1983 to 2006.

Men's doubles
Year	Tournament	Partner	Opponent	Score	Result
1987	Japan Open	(South Korea) Lee Deuk-choon	(Indonesia) Liem Swie King (Indonesia) Eddy Hartono	4–15, 7–15	(silver) Runner-up
1991	Hong Kong Open	(South Korea) Lee Sang-bok	(China) Zheng Yumin (China) Huang Zhanzhong	7–15, 15–8, 15–11	(gold) Winner

Mixed doubles
Year	Tournament	Partner	Opponent	Score	Result
1991	Hong Kong Open	(South Korea) Gil Young-ah	(South Korea) Lee Sang-bok (South Korea) Shim Eun-jung	15–17, 1–15	(silver) Runner-up
1991	World Grand Prix Finals	(South Korea) Gil Young-ah	(Denmark) Thomas Lund (Denmark) Pernille Dupont	15–11, 7–15, 9–15	(silver) Runner-up

=== IBF International ===
Men's doubles
Year	Tournament	Partner	Opponent	Score	Result
1989	Hungarian International	(South Korea) Sung Han-kook	(Soviet Union) Andrey Antropov (Soviet Union) Sergey Sevryukov	15–11, 15–11	(gold) Winner
1990	Hungarian International	(South Korea) Lee Sang-bok	(South Korea) Ahn Jae-chang (South Korea) Lee Kwang-jin	17–14, 15–9	(gold) Winner

Mixed doubles
Year	Tournament	Partner	Opponent	Score	Result
1989	Hungarian International	(South Korea) Chung So-young	(South Korea) Sung Han-kook (South Korea) Chung Myung-hee	15–9, 10–15, 4–15	(silver) Runner-up
1990	Hungarian International	(South Korea) Park Kyung-hee	(South Korea) Lee Sang-bok (South Korea) Hwang Hye-young	7–15, 9–15	(silver) Runner-up
