= Yap Yee Hup =

Malaysian badminton player and coach

Yap Yee Hup 叶贻合
Personal information
- Born: 20 February 1970 (age 56)
- Years active: 1988-1996
- Height: 1.71 m (5 ft 7 in)
- Weight: 65 kg (143 lb)

Sport
- Country: Malaysia
- Sport: Badminton
- Handedness: Right

Men's doubles
- Highest ranking: 5 (1995)
Medal record
Representing Malaysia
Men's badminton
World Cup
Bronze medal – third place	1992 Guangzhou	Men's doubles
Asian Championships
Bronze medal – third place	1993 Hong Kong	Men's team

Yap Yee Hup (born 20 February 1970) is a former badminton player from Malaysia and coach. He is the twin brother of Yap Yee Guan.

== Achievements ==
=== World Cup ===
Men's doubles
Year	Venue	Partner	Opponent	Score	Result
1992	Guangdong Gymnasium; Guangzhou, China	(Malaysia) Yap Yee Guan	(Malaysia) Cheah Soon Kit (Malaysia) Soo Beng Kiang	3–15, 14–17	Bronze

=== IBF World Grand Prix ===
The World Badminton Grand Prix sanctioned by International Badminton Federation (IBF) from 1983 to 2006.

Men's doubles
Year	Tournament	Partner	Opponent	Score	Result
1994	Canadian Open	(Malaysia) Yap Yee Guan	(Indonesia) Candra Wijaya (Indonesia) Ade Sutrisna	10–15, 12–15	(silver) Runner-up
1994	U.S. Open	(Malaysia) Yap Yee Guan	(Indonesia) Candra Wijaya (Indonesia) Ade Sutrisna	8–15, 14–15	(silver) Runner-up
1995	Chinese Taipei Open	(Malaysia) Yap Yee Guan	(Indonesia) Denny Kantono (Indonesia) Antonius Ariantho	7–15, 18–14, 2–15	(silver) Runner-up

=== IBF International ===
Men's doubles
Year	Tournament	Partner	Opponent	Score	Result
1990	Polish International	(Malaysia) Yap Yee Guan	(Denmark) Thomas Stuer-Lauridsen (Denmark) Christian Jakobsen	10–15, 15–12, 5–15	(silver) Runner-up
1991	French Open	(Malaysia) Yap Yee Guan	(Malaysia) Tan Kim Her (Malaysia) Yap Kim Hock	15–7, 15–11	(gold) Winner
1992	Brunei Open	(Malaysia) Yap Yee Guan	(Indonesia) Aras Razak (Indonesia) Reony Mainaky	15–10, 1–15, 17–18	(silver) Runner-up
