= Chen Kang (badminton) =

Chinese badminton player

Chen Kang 陈康
Personal information
- Born: 24 November 1965 (age 60)
- Height: 182 cm (6 ft 0 in)

Sport
- Country: China
- Sport: Badminton
- Handedness: Right
- Event: Men's doubles

Men's doubles
- BWF profile
Medal record
Men's badminton
Representing China
World Championships
Silver medal – second place	1989 Jakarta	Men's doubles
Bronze medal – third place	1993 Birmingham	Men's doubles
World Cup
Silver medal – second place	1993 New Delhi	Men's doubles
Bronze medal – third place	1991 Macau	Men's doubles
Bronze medal – third place	1992 Guangzhou	Men's doubles
Sudirman Cup
Bronze medal – third place	1989 Jakarta	Mixed team
Bronze medal – third place	1993 Birmingham	Mixed team
Thomas Cup
Gold medal – first place	1988 Kuala Lumpur	Men's team
Gold medal – first place	1990 Nagoya & Tokyo	Men's team
Bronze medal – third place	1994 Jakarta	Men's team
Asian Games
Silver medal – second place	1986 Seoul	Men's team
Bronze medal – third place	1986 Seoul	Men's doubles
Bronze medal – third place	1994 Hiroshima	Men's doubles
Bronze medal – third place	1994 Hiroshima	Men's team
Asian Championships
Gold medal – first place	1994 Shanghai	Men's doubles
Silver medal – second place	1991 Kuala Lumpur	Men's doubles
Silver medal – second place	1993 Hong Kong	Men's team
Asian Cup
Bronze medal – third place	1991 Jakarta	Men's doubles

Chen Kang (born 24 November 1965) is a Chinese badminton player. He competed in the men's doubles tournament at the 1992 Summer Olympics.

== Achievements ==
=== World Championships ===
Men's doubles
Year	Venue	Partner	Opponent	Score	Result
1989	Senayan Sports Complex, Jakarta, Indonesia	(China) Chen Hongyong	(China) Li Yongbo (China) Tian Bingyi	3–15, 12–15	Silver
1993	National Indoor Arena, Birmingham, England	(China) Chen Hongyong	(Malaysia) Cheah Soon Kit (Malaysia) Soo Beng Kiang	6–15, 5–15	Bronze

=== World Cup ===
Men's doubles
Year	Venue	Partner	Opponent	Score	Result
1991	Macau Forum, Macau	(China) Chen Hongyong	(Malaysia) Razif Sidek (Malaysia) Jalani Sidek	15–10, 7–15, 9–15	Bronze
1992	Guangdong Gymnasium, Guangzhou, China	(China) Chen Hongyong	(Indonesia) Rexy Mainaky (Indonesia) Ricky Subagja	11–15, 11–15	Bronze
1993	Phan Dinh Phung Indoor Stadium, Ho Chi Minh City, Vietnam	(China) Chen Hongyong	(Indonesia) Rexy Mainaky (Indonesia) Ricky Subagja	7–15, 15–12, 9–15	Silver

=== Asian Games ===
Men's doubles
Year	Venue	Partner	Opponent	Score	Result
1986	Olympic Gymnastics Arena, Seoul, South Korea	(China) Ding Qiqing	(South Korea) Park Joo-bong (South Korea) Kim Moon-soo	10–15, 3–15	Bronze
1994	Tsuru Memorial Gymnasium, Hiroshima, Japan	(China) Chen Hongyong	(Indonesia) Rexy Mainaky (Indonesia) Ricky Subagja	5–15, 10–15	Bronze

=== Asian Championships ===
Men's doubles
Year	Venue	Partner	Opponent	Score	Result
1991	Cheras Indoor Stadium, Kuala Lumpur, Malaysia	(China) Chen Hongyong	(South Korea) Park Joo-bong (South Korea) Kim Moon-soo	12–15, 10–15	Silver
1994	Shanghai Gymnasium, Shanghai, China	(China) Chen Hongyong	(Malaysia) Tan Kim Her (Malaysia) Yap Kim Hock	15–10, 15–11	Gold

=== Asian Cup ===
Men's doubles
Year	Venue	Partner	Opponent	Score	Result
1991	Istora Senayan, Jakarta, Indonesia	(China) Chen Hongyong	(Malaysia) Cheah Soon Kit (Malaysia) Soo Beng Kiang	5–15, 8–15	Bronze

=== IBF World Grand Prix ===
The World Badminton Grand Prix, sanctioned by International Badminton Federation (IBF) since from 1983 to 2006.

Men's doubles
Year	Tournament	Partner	Opponent	Score	Result
1985	English Masters	(China) Zhang Qingwu	(England) Andy Goode (England) Nigel Tier	7–15, 9–15	(silver) Runner-up
1988	German Open	(China) Chen Hongyong	(Denmark) Steen Fladberg (Denmark) Jan Paulsen	8–15, 15–6, 13–18	(silver) Runner-up
1988	Swedish Open	(China) Chen Hongyong	(China) Li Yongbo (China) Tian Bingyi	Walkover	(silver) Runner-up
1988	Indonesia Open	(China) Chen Hongyong	(Malaysia) Razif Sidek (Malaysia) Jalani Sidek	18–16, 5–15, 2–15	(silver) Runner-up
1988	China Open	(China) Chen Hongyong	(China) Li Yongbo (China) Tian Bingyi	15–13, 8–15, 3–15	(silver) Runner-up
1990	Thailand Open	(China) Chen Hongyong	(South Korea) Park Joo-bong (South Korea) Kim Moon-soo	6–15, 15–12, 10–15	(silver) Runner-up
1992	Japan Open	(China) Chen Hongyong	(China) Li Yongbo (China) Tian Bingyi	15–3, 15–4	(gold) Winner
1992	Malaysia Open	(China) Chen Hongyong	(Malaysia) Cheah Soon Kit (Malaysia) Soo Beng Kiang	14–17, 8–15	(silver) Runner-up
1992	Singapore Open	(China) Chen Hongyong	(Thailand) Pramote Teerawiwatana (Thailand) Sakrapee Thongsari	15–11, 15–9	(gold) Winner
1993	All England Open	(China) Chen Hongyong	(Denmark) Jon Holst-Christensen (Denmark) Thomas Lund	2–15, 11–15	(silver) Runner-up
1993	Japan Open	(China) Chen Hongyong	(Thailand) Pramote Teerawiwatana (Thailand) Sakrapee Thongsari	18–16, 12–15, 15–3	(gold) Winner
1993	China Open	(China) Chen Hongyong	(Indonesia) Rudy Gunawan (Indonesia) Bambang Suprianto	3–15, 15–12, 12–15	(silver) Runner-up

=== IBF International ===
Men's doubles
Year	Tournament	Partner	Opponent	Score	Result
1984	U.S. Open	(China) Huang Zhen	(China) Chen Hongyong (China) Zhang Qingwu	15–12, 5–15, 7–15	(silver) Runner-up
1991	Finnish Open	(China) Chen Hongyong	(China) Huang Zhanzhong (China) Zheng Yumin	10–15, 15–12, 15–12	(gold) Winner
1992	Swedish Open	(China) Chen Hongyong	(Sweden) Peter Axelsson (Sweden) Pär-Gunnar Jönsson	15–12, 15–4	(gold) Winner
1993	Canadian Open	(China) Chen Hongyong	(Denmark) Jon Holst-Christensen (Denmark) Thomas Lund	7–15, 15–7, 4–15	(silver) Runner-up
