= 1995 Badminton Asian Cup =

Badminton championships

1995 Asian Cup
Tournament details
- Dates: 14–18 June
- Total prize money: US$130,000
- Venue: Xinxing Gymnasium
- Location: Qingdao, China

The 1995 Badminton Asian Cup was the third edition of Badminton Asian Cup. It was held in Xinxing Gymnasium, Qingdao, China from 14 to 18 June with total prize money of US$130,000. Chinese team won titles in all the doubles events while Indonesia and South Korea won the men's singles and women's singly title respectively.

== Medalists ==
| Event | Gold | Silver | Bronze |
|---|---|---|---|
| Men's singles | (Indonesia) Joko Suprianto | (China) Sun Jun | (South Korea) Park Sung-woo |
| Men's singles | (Indonesia) Joko Suprianto | (China) Sun Jun | (Indonesia) Hermawan Susanto |
| Women's singles | (South Korea) Bang Soo-hyun | (Indonesia) Mia Audina | (China) Han Jingna |
| Women's singles | (South Korea) Bang Soo-hyun | (Indonesia) Mia Audina | (Thailand) Somharuthai Jaroensiri |
| Men's doubles | (China) Huang Zhanzhong (China) Jiang Xin | (Malaysia) Cheah Soon Kit (Malaysia) Yap Kim Hock | (Indonesia) Ade Sutrisna (Indonesia) Candra Wijaya |
| Men's doubles | (China) Huang Zhanzhong (China) Jiang Xin | (Malaysia) Cheah Soon Kit (Malaysia) Yap Kim Hock | (Indonesia) Rudy Gunawan (Indonesia) Bambang Suprianto |
| Women's doubles | (China) Ge Fei (China) Gu Jun | (South Korea) Gil Young-ah (South Korea) Jang Hye-ock | (China) Qin Yiyuan (China) Tang Yongshu |
| Women's doubles | (China) Ge Fei (China) Gu Jun | (South Korea) Gil Young-ah (South Korea) Jang Hye-ock | (Indonesia) Finarsih (Indonesia) Lili Tampi |
| Mixed doubles | (China) Liu Jianjun (China) Sun Man | (South Korea) Kim Dong-moon (South Korea) Gil Young-ah | (Indonesia) Tri Kusharjanto (Indonesia) Minarti Timur |
| Mixed doubles | (China) Liu Jianjun (China) Sun Man | (South Korea) Kim Dong-moon (South Korea) Gil Young-ah | (South Korea) Ha Tae-kwon (South Korea) Kim Shin-young |

=== Medal table ===
| Rank | Nation | Gold | Silver | Bronze | Total |
|---|---|---|---|---|---|
| 1 | China (CHN) | 3 | 1 | 2 | 6 |
| 2 | South Korea | 1 | 2 | 2 | 5 |
| 3 | Indonesia (INA) | 1 | 1 | 5 | 7 |
| 4 | Malaysia (MAS) | 0 | 1 | 0 | 1 |
| 5 | Thailand (THA) | 0 | 0 | 1 | 1 |
| Totals (5 entries) | | 5 | 5 | 10 | 20 |

== Results ==
=== Semifinals ===
Some of the entries are missing, you can help Wikipedia by adding the missing information with reliable source.

| Discipline | Winner | Runner-up | Score |
|---|---|---|---|
| Men's singles | (Indonesia) Joko Suprianto | (South Korea) Park Sung-woo | 9–15, 17–14, 15–1 |
| Men's singles | (China) Sun Jun | (Indonesia) Hermawan Susanto | 1–15, 15–5, 17–14 |
| Women's singles | (South Korea) Bang Soo-hyun | (China) Han Jingna | 11–1, 11–3 |
| Women's singles | (Indonesia) Mia Audina | (Thailand) Somharuthai Jaroensiri | 8–11, 11–5, 11–3 |
| Men's doubles | (China) Huang Zhanzhong (China) Jiang Xin | (Indonesia) Ade Sutrisna (Indonesia) Candra Wijaya | –, – |
| Men's doubles | (Malaysia) Cheah Soon Kit (Malaysia) Yap Kim Hock | (Indonesia) Rudy Gunawan (Indonesia) Bambang Suprianto | 15–6, 17–14 |
| Women's doubles | (China) Ge Fei (China) Gu Jun | (China) Qin Yiyuan (China) Tang Yongshu | 15–8, 15–6 |
| Women's doubles | (South Korea) Gil Young-ah (South Korea) Jang Hye-ock | (Indonesia) Finarsih (Indonesia) Lili Tampi | 15–6, 8–15, 15–7 |
| Mixed doubles | (China) Liu Jianjun (China) Sun Man | (Indonesia) Tri Kusharjanto (Indonesia) Minarti Timur | 15–13, 15–5 |
| Mixed doubles | (South Korea) Kim Dong-moon (South Korea) Gil Young-ah | (South Korea) Ha Tae-kwon (South Korea) Kim Shin-young | –, – |

=== Finals ===
| Discipline | Winner | Finalist | Score |
|---|---|---|---|
| Men's singles | (Indonesia) Joko Suprianto | (China) Sun Jun | 15–7, 15–8 |
| Women's singles | (South Korea) Bang Soo-hyun | (Indonesia) Mia Audina | 1–11, 11–2, 13–12 |
| Men's doubles | (China) Huang Zhanzhong (China) Jiang Xin | (Malaysia) Cheah Soon Kit (Malaysia) Yap Kim Hock | 15–10, 15–11 |
| Women's doubles | (China) Ge Fei (China) Gu Jun | (South Korea) Gil Young-ah (South Korea) Jang Hye-ock | 15–7, 18–17 |
| Mixed doubles | (China) Liu Jianjun (China) Sun Man | (South Korea) Kim Dong-moon (South Korea) Gil Young-ah | 15–11, 7–15, 15–10 |
