= 1995 World Badminton Grand Prix Finals =

Tournament details
- Dates: 29 November–3 December
- Edition: 13
- Total prize money: US$325,000
- Location: Singapore

The 1995 World Badminton Grand Prix was the 13th edition of the World Badminton Grand Prix finals. It was held in Singapore, from November 29 to December 3, 1995.

== Final results ==
Category	Winners	Runners-up	Score
Men's singles	(Indonesia) Joko Suprianto	(Indonesia) Ardy B. Wiranata	15–3, 6–15, 15–6
Women's singles	(China) Ye Zhaoying	(Sweden) Lim Xiaoqing	12–10, 8–11, 11–8
Men's doubles	(Malaysia) Cheah Soon Kit & Yap Kim Hock	(Indonesia) Rudy Gunawan & Bambang Suprianto	13–18, 15–2, 15–12
Women's doubles	(China) Ge Fei & Gu Jun	(South Korea) Gil Young-ah & Jang Hye-ock	15–7, 15–12
Mixed doubles	(Indonesia) Trikus Heryanto & Minarti Timur	(England) Simon Archer & Julie Bradbury	15–8, 15–8
