= Huang Zhanzhong =

Chinese badminton player

Huang Zhanzhong 黄展忠
Personal information
- Born: 5 November 1968 (age 58) Zhejiang, China
- Height: 1.80 m (5 ft 11 in)

Sport
- Country: China
- Sport: Badminton
- Event: Men's doubles

Men's doubles
- BWF profile
Medal record
Men's badminton
Representing China
Sudirman Cup
Gold medal – first place	1995 Lausanne	Mixed team
Thomas Cup
Bronze medal – third place	1992 Kuala Lumpur	Men's team
Bronze medal – third place	1994 Jakarta	Men's team
Bronze medal – third place	1996 Hong Kong	Men's team
Asian Games
Gold medal – first place	1990 Beijing	Men's team
Bronze medal – third place	1994 Hiroshima	Men's doubles
Bronze medal – third place	1994 Hiroshima	Men's team
Asian Championships
Gold medal – first place	1989 Shanghai	Men's team
Silver medal – second place	1992 Kuala Lumpur	Men's doubles
Silver medal – second place	1995 Beijing	Men's doubles
Silver medal – second place	1993 Hong Kong	Men's team
Bronze medal – third place	1994 Shanghai	Men's doubles
Asian Cup
Gold medal – first place	1995 Qingdao	Men's doubles
Bronze medal – third place	1991 Jakarta	Men's doubles
East Asian Games
Gold medal – first place	1993 Shanghai	Men's team
Silver medal – second place	1993 Shanghai	Men's doubles

Huang Zhanzhong (simplified Chinese: 黄展忠; traditional Chinese: 黃展忠; born 5 November 1968) is a Chinese badminton player. He won the men's doubles title at the 1995 Asian Cup, and was part of Chinese team that won the 1990 Asian Games and 1995 Sudirman Cup. Huang competed in the men's doubles tournament at the 1996 Summer Olympics.

== Career ==
Huang is a Wenzhou, Zhejiang natives, who started to know sport since he was in elementary school. His skills were discovered during a badminton talent identification program by Zhejiang province team in 1979, when he was 11 years old. Although he started the training from the basics, Huang immediately shown a good progress in the men's doubles, and then after won some national tournaments, he was selected to join national team in Beijing in 1989.

Huang reached his first Grand Prix tournament finals at the 1989 China Open with his partner Zheng Yumin, but the duo defeated by Malaysian pair Jalani and Razif Sidek in rubber games. He later helps Chinese team won the 1989 Asian Championships held in Shanghai, beating Indonesian team 5–0, then the men's team event at the 1990 Asian Games defeating Malaysian team 5–0.

In 1991, Huang reached four Grand Prix tournament finals in Finland, Singapore, China, and Hong Kong, and then won his first title in Denmark Open. Huang and Zheng Yumin were qualified to compete at the World Grand Prix Finals, advanced to final round, but lost again to Jalani and Razif Sidek of Malaysia. In December 1991, he and Zheng also won a bronze medal at the Asian Cup after lost the semifinals match to Rexy Mainaky and Ricky Subagja of Indonesia.

In 1992, Huang won a silver medal at the Asian Championships in the men's doubles event with Zheng Yumin. Unfortunately, he and Zheng failed to qualified at the 1992 Summer Olympics, since their points were not enough to be able to take part at that Games. He then could not give his best in the rest tournament after the Olympic Games, without a single title, only finished as finalists in Hong Kong and Thailand Open.

In 1993, Huang won his second Grand Prix men's doubles title at the Korea Open with Zheng Yumin. He then participated at the East Asian Games held in Shanghai, won a gold in the men's team and a silver medal in the men's doubles with Liu Di. In 1994, he won the China Open with his new partner Jiang Xin, and won bronze medals at Asian Championships and Asian Games. In 1995, he and Jiang Xin won the Asian Cup, China Open, Thailand Open, and was a member of Chinese winning team at the Sudirman Cup.

After retired from the national team, he works as a coach in Zhejiang team.

== Achievements ==
=== Asian Games ===
Men's doubles
Year	Venue	Partner	Opponent	Score	Result
1994	Tsuru Memorial Gymnasium; Hiroshima, Japan	(China) Jiang Xin	(Malaysia) Cheah Soon Kit (Malaysia) Soo Beng Kiang	9–15, 5–15	Bronze

=== Asian Championships ===
Men's doubles
Year	Venue	Partner	Opponent	Score	Result
1992	Cheras Indoor Stadium; Kuala Lumpur, Malaysia	(China) Zheng Yumin	(Malaysia) Jalani Sidek (Malaysia) Razif Sidek	4–15, 6–15	Silver
1994	Shanghai Gymnasium; Shanghai, China	(China) Jiang Xin	(Malaysia) Tan Kim Her (Malaysia) Yap Kim Hock	4–15, 3–15	Bronze
1995	Olympic Sports Center Gymnasium, Beijing, China	(China) Jiang Xin	(Malaysia) Cheah Soon Kit (Malaysia) Yap Kim Hock	15–7, 8–15, 7–15	Silver

=== Asian Cup ===
Men's doubles
Year	Venue	Partner	Opponent	Score	Result
1991	Istora Senayan; Jakarta, Indonesia	(China) Zheng Yumin	(Indonesia) Rexy Mainaky (Indonesia) Ricky Subagja	4–15, 8–15	Bronze
1995	Xinxing Gymnasium; Qingdao, China	(China) Jiang Xin	(Malaysia) Cheah Soon Kit (Malaysia) Yap Kim Hock	15–10, 15–11	Gold

=== East Asian Games ===
Men's doubles
Year	Venue	Partner	Opponent	Score	Result
1993	Shanghai, China	(China) Liu Di	(China) Jiang Xin (China) Yu Qi	12–15, 15–18	Silver

=== IBF World Grand Prix ===
The World Badminton Grand Prix sanctioned by International Badminton Federation (IBF) since from 1983 to 2006.

Men's doubles
Year	Tournament	Partner	Opponent	Score	Result
1989	China Open	(China) Zheng Yumin	(Malaysia) Jalani Sidek (Malaysia) Razif Sidek	15–9, 14–17, 12–15	(silver) Runner-up
1991	Finnish Open	(China) Zheng Yumin	(China) Chen Hongyong (China) Chen Kang	15–10, 12–15, 12–15	(silver) Runner-up
1991	Singapore Open	(China) Zheng Yumin	(South Korea) Kim Moon-soo (South Korea) Park Joo-bong	2–15, 4–15	(silver) Runner-up
1991	Denmark Open	(China) Zheng Yumin	(South Korea) Kim Moon-soo (South Korea) Park Joo-bong	15–10, 15–9	(gold) Winner
1991	China Open	(China) Zheng Yumin	(China) Li Yongbo (China) Tian Bingyi	8–15, 10–15	(silver) Runner-up
1991	Hong Kong Open	(China) Zheng Yumin	(South Korea) Lee Sang-bok (South Korea) Shon Jin-hwan	15–7, 8–15, 11–15	(silver) Runner-up
1991	World Grand Prix Finals	(China) Zheng Yumin	(Malaysia) Jalani Sidek (Malaysia) Razif Sidek	10–15, 15–12, 14–18	(silver) Runner-up
1992	Hong Kong Open	(China) Zheng Yumin	(Indonesia) Rexy Mainaky (Indonesia) Ricky Subagja	13–15, 10–15	(silver) Runner-up
1992	Thailand Open	(China) Zheng Yumin	(Indonesia) Rexy Mainaky (Indonesia) Ricky Subagja	9–15, 15–12, 11–15	(silver) Runner-up
1993	Korea Open	(China) Zheng Yumin	(Denmark) Jon Holst-Christensen (Denmark) Thomas Lund	5–15, 15–10, 15–8	(gold) Winner
1994	China Open	(China) Jiang Xin	(Malaysia) Tan Kim Her (Malaysia) Yap Kim Hock	15–10, 15–8	(gold) Winner
1995	U.S. Open	(China) Jiang Xin	(Indonesia) Rudy Gunawan (Indonesia) Bambang Suprianto	3–15, 10–15	(silver) Runner-up
1995	China Open	(China) Jiang Xin	(Denmark) Jon Holst-Christensen (Denmark) Thomas Lund	15–8, 15–11	(gold) Winner
1995	Thailand Open	(China) Jiang Xin	(Malaysia) Cheah Soon Kit (Malaysia) Yap Kim Hock	15–9, 15–11	(gold) Winner
