= Pär-Gunnar Jönsson =

Swedish badminton player

Personal information
- Nickname: PG
- Born: 6 August 1963 (age 63) Gothenburg, Västra Götaland County, Sweden
- Years active: 17
- Height: 1.87 m (6 ft 2 in)

Sport
- Country: Sweden
- Sport: Badminton
- Handedness: Right

Singles and Doubles
- Highest ranking: 1 (MD), 2 (XD), 15 (MS)
- BWF profile
Medal record
Men's badminton
Representing Sweden
World Championships
| Bronze medal – third place | 1993 Birmingham | Men's doubles |
World Cup
| Bronze medal – third place | 1993 New Delhi | Men's doubles |
| Bronze medal – third place | 1991 Macau | Mixed doubles |
| Bronze medal – third place | 1992 Guangzhou | Mixed doubles |
| Bronze medal – third place | 1993 New Delhi | Mixed doubles |
European Championships
| Silver medal – second place | 1998 Sofia | Men's Doubles |
| Silver medal – second place | 2000 Glasgow | Men's Doubles |
| Bronze medal – third place | 1986 Uppsala | Men's doubles |
| Bronze medal – third place | 1992 Glasgow | Men's Doubles |
| Bronze medal – third place | 1996 Herning | Men's Doubles |
| Bronze medal – third place | 1992 Glasgow | Mixed Doubles |
| Bronze medal – third place | 1994 Dan Bosch | Mixed Doubles |
European Mixed Team Championships
| Gold medal – first place | 1992 Glasgow | Mixed team |
| Gold medal – first place | 1994 Dan Bosch | Mixed team |
| Silver medal – second place | 1996 Herning | Mixed team |
| Bronze medal – third place | 1986 Uppsala | Mixed team |
| Bronze medal – third place | 1998 Sofia | Mixed team |
European Junior Championships
| Bronze medal – third place | 1981 Edinburgh | Mixed team |

Pär-Gunnar Jönsson (born 6 August 1963) is a retired badminton player from Sweden.

== Career ==
He won the bronze medal at the 1993 IBF World Championships in men's doubles with Peter Axelsson.

== Achievements ==
=== World Championships ===
Men's doubles
| Year | Venue | Partner | Opponent | Score | Result |
|---|---|---|---|---|---|
| 1993 | National Indoor Arena, Birmingham, England | (Sweden) Peter Axelsson | (Indonesia) Rudy Gunawan (Indonesia) Ricky Subagja | 9–15, 15–11, 4–15 | Bronze |

=== World Cup ===
Men's doubles
| Year | Venue | Partner | Opponent | Score | Result |
|---|---|---|---|---|---|
| 1993 | Indira Gandhi Arena, New Delhi, India | (Sweden) Peter Axelsson | (China) Chen Hongyong (China) Chen Kang | 9–15, 5–15 | Bronze |

Mixed doubles
| Year | Venue | Partner | Opponent | Score | Result |
|---|---|---|---|---|---|
| 1991 | Macau Forum; Macau | (Sweden) Maria Bengtsson | (Denmark) Thomas Lund (Denmark) Pernille Dupont | 4–15, 2–15 | Bronze |
| 1992 | Guangdong Gymnasium; Guangzhou, China | (Sweden) Maria Bengtsson | (Denmark) Jan Paulsen (England) Gillian Gowers | 15–12, 14–18, 14–17 | Bronze |
| 1993 | Indira Gandhi Indoor Stadium; New Delhi, India | (Sweden) Maria Bengtsson | (Indonesia) Aryono Miranat (Indonesia) Eliza Nathanael | 14–17, 15–7, 9–15 | Bronze |

=== European Championships ===
Men's doubles
| Year | Venue | Partner | Opponent | Score | Result |
|---|---|---|---|---|---|
| 1986 | Fyrishallen; Uppsala, Sweden | (Sweden) Jan-Eric Antonsson | (Denmark) Steen Fladberg (Denmark) Jesper Helledie | 7–15, 5–15 | Bronze |
| 1992 | Glasgow, Scotland | (Sweden) Peter Axelsson | (Denmark) Jon Holst Christensen (Denmark) Thomas Lund | 15–18, 15–10, 5–15 | Bronze |
| 1996 | Herning Badminton Klub, Herning, Denmark | (Sweden) Peter Axelsson | (Denmark) Henrik Svarrer (Denmark) Michael Sogaard | 8–15, 6–15 | Bronze |
| 1998 | Winter Sports Palace, Sofia, Bulgaria | (Sweden) Peter Axelsson | (England) Simon Archer (England) Chris Hunt | 3–15, 3–15 | Silver |
| 2000 | Kelvin Hall International Sports Arena, Glasgow, Scotland | (Sweden) Peter Axelsson | (Denmark) Jens Eriksen (Denmark) Jesper Larsen | 7–15, 6–15 | Silver |

Mixed doubles
| Year | Venue | Partner | Opponent | Score | Result |
|---|---|---|---|---|---|
| 1992 | Kelvin Hall International Sports Arena; Glasgow, Scotland | (Sweden) Maria Bengtsson | (Denmark) Jon-Holst Christensen (Denmark) Grete Mogensen | 6–15, 11–15 | Bronze |
| 1994 | Maaspoort; Den Bosch, Netherlands | (Sweden) Maria Bengtsson | (Denmark) Michael Søgaard (Sweden) Catrine Bengtsson | 6–15, 6–15 | Bronze |

=== IBF World Grand Prix ===
The World Badminton Grand Prix sanctioned by International Badminton Federation (IBF) from 1983 to 2006.

Men's singles
| Year | Tournament | Opponent | Score | Result |
|---|---|---|---|---|
| 1991 | Swiss Open | (Denmark) Ib Frederiksen | 18–17, 3–15, 15–7 | (gold) Winner |

Men's doubles
| Year | Tournament | Partner | Opponent | Score | Result |
|---|---|---|---|---|---|
| 1987 | Denmark Open | (Sweden) Jan-Eric Antonsson | (Malaysia) Razif Sidek (Malaysia) Jalani Sidek | 11–15, 7–15 | (silver) Runner-up |
| 1988 | Chinese Taipei Open | (Sweden) Jan-Eric Antonsson | (Thailand) Sawei Chanseorasmee (Thailand) Sakrapee Thongsari | 15–11, 9–15, 11–15 | (silver) Runner-up |
| 1989 | Chinese Taipei Open | (Sweden) Jan-Eric Antonsson | (Malaysia) Razif Sidek (Malaysia) Jalani Sidek | 3–15, 2–15 | (silver) Runner-up |
| 1989 | Japan Open | (Sweden) Jan-Eric Antonsson | (South Korea) Park Joo-bong (South Korea) Lee Sang-bok | 6–15, 5–15 | (silver) Runner-up |
| 1990 | Scottish Open | (Sweden) Peter Axelsson | (Denmark) Mark Christiansen (Denmark) Michael Kjeldsen | 13–15, 15–10, 15–11 | (gold) Winner |
| 1991 | Swiss Open | (Sweden) Stellan Österberg | (England) Andy Goode (England) Chris Hunt | 15–10, 18–14 | (gold) Winner |
| 1991 | Scottish Open | (Sweden) Peter Axelsson | (Denmark) Thomas Lund (Denmark) Jon Holst-Christensen | 15–18, 11–15 | (silver) Runner-up |
| 1992 | Swedish Open | (Sweden) Peter Axelsson | (China) Chen Hongyong (China) Chen Kang | 12–15, 4–15 | (silver) Runner-Up |
| 1992 | Finnish Open | (Sweden) Peter Axelsson | (Indonesia) Rudi Gunawan Haditono (Indonesia) Dick Purwotjugiono | 15–8, 15–5 | (gold) Winner |
| 1992 | Scottish Open | (Sweden) Peter Axelsson | (Denmark) Jon Holst-Christensen (Denmark) Christian Jakobsen | 15–10, 15–11 | (gold) Winner |
| 1993 | Swiss Open | (Sweden) Peter Axelsson | (Sweden) Stellan Österberg (Denmark) Max Gandrup | 15–4, 15–4 | (gold) Winner |
| 1993 | Swedish Open | (Sweden) Peter Axelsson | (Indonesia) Rexy Mainaky (Indonesia) Ricky Subagja | 12–15, 10–15 | (silver) Runner-up |
| 1994 | Korea Open | (Sweden) Peter Axelsson | (Indonesia) Denny Kantono (Indonesia) Ricky Subagja | 17–14, 15–7 | (gold) Winner |
| 1994 | Swiss Open | (Sweden) Peter Axelsson | (Malaysia) Tan Kim Her (Malaysia) Yap Kim Hock | 15–7, 15–8 | (gold) Winner |
| 1994 | Swedish Open | (Sweden) Peter Axelsson | (Indonesia) Rexy Mainaky (Indonesia) Ricky Subagja | 11–15, 12–15 | (silver) Runner-up |
| 1995 | Swedish Open | (Sweden) Peter Axelsson | (South Korea) Kang Kyung-jin (South Korea) Kim Dong-moon | 15–5, 15–9 | (gold) Winner |
| 1996 | Chinese Taipei Open | (Sweden) Peter Axelsson | (Indonesia) Denny Kantono (Indonesia) Antonius Ariantho | 6–15, 7–15 | (silver) Runner-up |
| 1997 | Swedish Open | (Sweden) Peter Axelsson | (South Korea) Ha Tae-kwon (South Korea) Kang Kyung-jin | 3–15, 11–15 | (silver) Runner-up |
| 1998 | Dutch Open | (Sweden) Peter Axelsson | (Malaysia) Cheah Soon Kit (Malaysia) Choong Tan Fook | 11–15, 9–15 | (silver) Runner-up |
| 1999 | German Open | (Sweden) Peter Axelsson | (Malaysia) Lee Wan Wah (Malaysia) Choong Tan Fook | 9–15, 6–15 | (silver) Runner-up |

Mixed doubles
| Year | Tournament | Partner | Opponent | Score | Result |
|---|---|---|---|---|---|
| 1988 | Scottish Open | (Sweden) Maria Bengtsson | (Denmark) Nils Skeby (Denmark) Gitte Paulsen | Walkover | (gold) Winner |
| 1989 | Denmark Open | (Sweden) Maria Bengtsson | (Denmark) Jesper Knudsen (Denmark) Nettie Nielsen | 6–15, 6–15 | (silver) Runner-up |
| 1990 | Dutch Open | (Sweden) Maria Bengtsson | (Denmark) Jon Holst-Christensen (Denmark) Grete Mogensen | 15–11, 15–8 | (gold) Winner |
| 1990 | German Open | (Sweden) Maria Bengtsson | (Denmark) Jan Paulsen (England) Gillian Gowers | 15–7, 15–5 | (gold) Winner |
| 1991 | Chinese Taipei Open | (Sweden) Maria Bengtsson | (Denmark) Thomas Lund (Denmark) Pernille Dupont | 9–15, 15–10, 16–18 | (silver) Runner-up |
| 1991 | Swedish Open | (Sweden) Maria Bengtsson | (Denmark) Thomas Lund (Denmark) Pernille Dupont | 7–15, 8–15 | (silver) Runner-up |
| 1991 | Singapore Open | (Sweden) Maria Bengtsson | (Denmark) Thomas Lund (Denmark) Pernille Dupont | 8–15, 12–15 | (silver) Runner-up |
| 1991 | Canadian Open | (Sweden) Maria Bengtsson | (England) Nick Ponting (England) Gillian Gowers | 10–15, 17–15, 6–15 | (silver) Runner-up |
| 1991 | Dutch Open | (Sweden) Maria Bengtsson | (Denmark) Henrik Svarrer (Denmark) Marlene Thomsen | 13–15, 11–15 | (silver) Runner-up |
| 1992 | Chinese Taipei Masters | (Sweden) Maria Bengtsson | (Denmark) Henrik Svarrer (Denmark) Marlene Thomsen | 15–6, 17–15 | (gold) Winner |
| 1992 | Swedish Open | (Sweden) Maria Bengtsson | (Denmark) Max Gandrup (Sweden) Catrine Bengtsson | 15–8, 15–12 | (gold) Winner |
| 1992 | Indonesia Open | (Sweden) Maria Bengtsson | (Indonesia) Aryono Miranat (Indonesia) Eliza Nathanael | 12–15, 15–11, 15–12 | (gold) Winner |
| 1992 | Singapore Open | (Sweden) Maria Bengtsson | (South Korea) Lee Sang-bok (South Korea) Gil Young-ah | 15–3, 15–10 | (gold) Winner |
| 1992 | German Open | (Sweden) Maria Bengtsson | (Denmark) Thomas Lund (Denmark) Pernille Dupont | 9–15, 12–15 | (silver) Runner-up |
| 1993 | Swiss Open | (Sweden) Maria Bengtsson | (Sweden) Jan-Eric Antonsson (Sweden) Astrid Crabo | 11–15, 17–14, 15–7 | (gold) Winner |
| 1993 | Dutch Open | (Sweden) Maria Bengtsson | (Sweden) Jan-Eric Antonsson (Sweden) Astrid Crabo | 13–18, 15–9, 9–15 | (silver) Runner-up |

=== IBF International ===
Men's doubles
| Year | Tournament | Partner | Opponent | Score | Result |
|---|---|---|---|---|---|
| 1992 | Nordic Championships | (Sweden) Peter Axelsson | (Denmark) Jon Holst-Christensen (Denmark) Jan Paulsen | 15–18, 11–15 | (silver) Runner-up |

Mixed doubles
| Year | Tournament | Partner | Opponent | Score | Result |
|---|---|---|---|---|---|
| 1992 | Nordic Championships | (Sweden) Maria Bengtsson | (Sweden) Jan-Eric Antonsson (Sweden) Astrid Crabo | 15–6, 12–15, 15–10 | (gold) Winner |
