= Yap Kim Hock =

Malaysian badminton player

Yap Kim Hock 叶锦福
Personal information
- Born: 2 August 1970 (age 56) Muar, Johor, Malaysia
- Years active: 1989–2000
- Height: 1.60 m (5 ft 3 in)
- Weight: 65 kg (143 lb)

Sport
- Country: Malaysia
- Sport: Badminton
- Handedness: Left

Men's doubles
- Highest ranking: 1 (1996)
- BWF profile
Medal record
Men's badminton
Representing Malaysia
Olympic Games
Silver medal – second place	1996 Atlanta	Men's doubles
World Championships
Silver medal – second place	1997 Glasgow	Men's doubles
Bronze medal – third place	1995 Lausanne	Men's doubles
World Cup
Bronze medal – third place	1994 Ho Chi Minh	Men's doubles
Bronze medal – third place	1995 Jakarta	Men's doubles
Bronze medal – third place	1996 Jakarta	Men's doubles
Thomas Cup
Silver medal – second place	1994 Jakarta	Men's team
Silver medal – second place	1998 Hong Kong	Men's team
Commonwealth Games
Gold medal – first place	1998 Kuala Lumpur	Men's team
Silver medal – second place	1994 Victoria	Mixed team
Silver medal – second place	1998 Kuala Lumpur	Men's doubles
Asian Games
Bronze medal – third place	1994 Hiroshima	Mixed doubles
Bronze medal – third place	1994 Hiroshima	Men's team
Asian Championships
Gold medal – first place	1995 Beijing	Men's doubles
Silver medal – second place	1994 Shanghai	Men's doubles
Bronze medal – third place	1999 Kuala Lumpur	Men's doubles
Asian Cup
Silver medal – second place	1995 Qingdao	Men's doubles
Bronze medal – third place	1994 Beijing	Men's doubles
Southeast Asian Games
Gold medal – first place	1995 Chiang Mai	Men's doubles
Silver medal – second place	1993 Singapore	Men's team
Silver medal – second place	1995 Chiang Mai	Men's team
Bronze medal – third place	1993 Singapore	Men's doubles

Yap Kim Hock AMN (simplified Chinese: 叶锦福; traditional Chinese: 葉錦福; pinyin: Yé Jǐnfú; Jyutping: Jip6 Gam2 Fuk1; Pe̍h-ōe-jī: Ia̍p Kím-hok; born on 2 August 1970) is a retired badminton player from Malaysia. He is the doubles head coach of the Singapore national badminton team.

== Career ==
He had played with different pairs such as Tan Kim Her (1989–1994) and Cheah Soon Kit (1995–2000). Yap represented Malaysia and competed at the 1996 Atlanta Olympics and the 2000 Sydney Olympics in the badminton men's doubles event with Cheah Soon Kit. At the 1996 Atlanta Olympics, they had a bye in the first round and defeated Denny Kantono and Antonius Ariantho of Indonesia in semifinals. In the final, Cheah and Yap lost to Rexy Mainaky and Ricky Subagja of Indonesia 15–5, 13–15, 12–15. At the 2000 Sydney Olympics, they could only reach the second round before losing to the Korean doubles.

== Achievements ==
=== Olympic Games ===
Men's doubles
Year	Venue	Partner	Opponent	Score	Result
1996	GSU Sports Arena, Atlanta, United States	(Malaysia) Cheah Soon Kit	(Indonesia) Rexy Mainaky (Indonesia) Ricky Subagja	15–5, 13–15, 12–15	Silver

=== World Championships ===
Men's doubles
Year	Venue	Partner	Opponent	Score	Result
1995	Malley Sports Centre, Lausanne, Switzerland	(Malaysia) Cheah Soon Kit	(Indonesia) Rexy Mainaky (Indonesia) Ricky Subagja	8–15, 6–15	Bronze
1997	Scotstoun Centre, Glasgow, Scotland	(Malaysia) Cheah Soon Kit	(Indonesia) Sigit Budiarto (Indonesia) Candra Wijaya	15–8, 17–18, 7–15	Silver

=== World Cup ===
Men's doubles
Year	Venue	Partner	Opponent	Score	Result
1994	Phan Đình Phùng Indoor Stadium; Ho Chi Minh City, Vietnam	(Malaysia) Tan Kim Her	(Malaysia) Cheah Soon Kit (Malaysia) Soo Beng Kiang	15–6, 11–15, 8–15	Bronze
1995	Istora Senayan, Jakarta, Indonesia	(Malaysia) Cheah Soon Kit	(Indonesia) Rexy Mainaky (Indonesia) Ricky Subagja	13–18, 9–15	Bronze
1996	Istora Senayan, Jakarta, Indonesia	(Malaysia) Cheah Soon Kit	(Indonesia) Antonius Ariantho (Indonesia) Denny Kantono	11–15, 15–3, 13–15	Bronze

=== Asian Championships ===
Men's doubles
Year	Venue	Partner	Opponent	Score	Result
1994	Shanghai Gymnasium, Shanghai, China	(Malaysia) Tan Kim Her	(China) Chen Hongyong (China) Chen Kang	10–15, 11–15	Silver
1995	Olympic Sports Center Gymnasium, Beijing, China	(Malaysia) Cheah Soon Kit	(China) Huang Zhanzhong (China) Jiang Xin	7–15, 15–8, 15–7	Gold
1999	Kuala Lumpur Badminton Stadium, Kuala Lumpur, Malaysia	(Malaysia) Cheah Soon Kit	(China) Zhang Jun (China) Zhang Wei	16–17, 8–15	Bronze

=== Asian Cup ===
Men's doubles
Year	Venue	Partner	Opponent	Score	Result
1994	Beijing Gymnasium, Beijing, China	(Malaysia) Tan Kim Her	(Malaysia) Cheah Soon Kit (Malaysia) Soo Beng Kiang	18–17, 0–15, 10–15	Bronze
1995	Xinxing Gymnasium, Qingdao, China	(Malaysia) Cheah Soon Kit	(China) Huang Zhanzhong (China) Jiang Xin	10–15, 11–15	Silver

=== Southeast Asian Games ===
Men's doubles
Year	Venue	Partner	Opponent	Score	Result
1993	Singapore Badminton Hall, Singapore	(Malaysia) Tan Kim Her	(Indonesia) Rexy Mainaky (Indonesia) Ricky Subagja	17–15, 7–15, 14–17	Bronze
1995	Gymnasium 3, 700th Anniversary Sport Complex; Chiang Mai, Thailand	(Malaysia) Cheah Soon Kit	(Indonesia) Rexy Mainaky (Indonesia) Ricky Subagja	15–13, 15–9	Gold

=== Commonwealth Games ===
Men's doubles
Year	Venue	Partner	Opponent	Score	Result
1998	Kuala Lumpur Badminton Stadium, Kuala Lumpur, Malaysia	(Malaysia) Cheah Soon Kit	(Malaysia) Choong Tan Fook (Malaysia) Lee Wan Wah	7–15, 4–15	Silver

=== IBF World Grand Prix ===
The World Badminton Grand Prix sanctioned by International Badminton Federation (IBF) from 1983 to 2006.

Men's doubles
Year	Tournament	Partner	Opponent	Score	Result
1992	Dutch Open	(Malaysia) Tan Kim Her	(Netherlands) Chris Bruil (Netherlands) Ron Michels	15–9, 15–10	(gold) Winner
1994	Swiss Open	(Malaysia) Tan Kim Her	(Sweden) Peter Axelsson (Sweden) Pär-Gunnar Jönsson	7–15, 8–15	(silver) Runner-up
1994	China Open	(Malaysia) Tan Kim Her	(China) Huang Zhanzhong (China) Jiang Xin	10–15, 8–15	(silver) Runner-up
1995	Malaysia Open	(Malaysia) Cheah Soon Kit	(Thailand) Pramote Teerawiwatana (Thailand) Sakrapee Thongsari	15–5, 12–15, 5–15	(silver) Runner-up
1995	Thailand Open	(Malaysia) Cheah Soon Kit	(China) Huang Zhanzhong (China) Jiang Xin	9–15, 11–15	(silver) Runner-up
1995	World Grand Prix Finals	(Malaysia) Cheah Soon Kit	(Indonesia) Rudy Gunawan (Indonesia) Bambang Suprianto	13–18, 15–2, 15–12	(gold) Winner
1996	Korea Open	(Malaysia) Cheah Soon Kit	(Indonesia) Rexy Mainaky (Indonesia) Ricky Subagja	5–15, 14–15	(silver) Runner-up
1996	All England Open	(Malaysia) Cheah Soon Kit	(Indonesia) Rexy Mainaky (Indonesia) Ricky Subagja	6–15, 5–15	(silver) Runner-up
1996	Malaysia Open	(Malaysia) Cheah Soon Kit	(Malaysia) Choong Tan Fook (Malaysia) Lee Wan Wah	15–5, 15–3	(gold) Winner
1996	US Open	(Malaysia) Cheah Soon Kit	(Indonesia) Sigit Budiarto (Indonesia) Candra Wijaya	16–18, 10–15	(silver) Runner-up
1996	Hong Kong Open	(Malaysia) Cheah Soon Kit	(Indonesia) Antonius Ariantho (Indonesia) Denny Kantono	6–15, 3–15	(silver) Runner-up
1996	World Grand Prix Finals	(Malaysia) Cheah Soon Kit	(Indonesia) Rexy Mainaky (Indonesia) Ricky Subagja	4–15, 9–15	(silver) Runner-up
1997	Korea Open	(Malaysia) Cheah Soon Kit	(South Korea) Ha Tae-kwon (South Korea) Kang Kyung-jin	15–4, 3–15, 5–15	(silver) Runner-up
1997	World Grand Prix Finals	(Malaysia) Cheah Soon Kit	(Indonesia) Sigit Budiarto (Indonesia) Candra Wijaya	15–17, 15–11, 5–15	(silver) Runner-up
1998	Japan Open	(Malaysia) Cheah Soon Kit	(Indonesia) Antonius Ariantho (Indonesia) Denny Kantono	15–9, 15–7	(gold) Winner
1999	Hong Kong Open	(Malaysia) Cheah Soon Kit	(Indonesia) Sigit Budiarto (Indonesia) Halim Haryanto	15–12, 15–12	(gold) Winner
2000	Chinese Taipei Open	(Malaysia) Cheah Soon Kit	(Indonesia) Tony Gunawan (Indonesia) Candra Wijaya	7–15, 7–15	(silver) Runner-up

=== IBF International ===
Men's doubles
Year	Tournament	Partner	Opponent	Score	Result
1991	French Open	(Malaysia) Tan Kim Her	(Malaysia) Yap Yee Guan (Malaysia) Yap Yee Hup	7–15, 11–15	(silver) Runner-up

== Honours ==
- Member of the Order of the Defender of the Realm (AMN) (1995).
