= Chen Hongyong =

Chinese badminton player

Chen Hongyong 陈红勇
Personal information
- Born: 1 May 1966 (age 60)
- Height: 174 cm (5 ft 9 in)

Sport
- Country: China
- Sport: Badminton
- Handedness: Right
- Event: Men's doubles

Men's doubles
- BWF profile
Medal record
Men's badminton
Representing China
World Championships
Silver medal – second place	1989 Jakarta	Men's doubles
Bronze medal – third place	1993 Birmingham	Men's doubles
World Cup
Silver medal – second place	1993 New Delhi	Men's doubles
Bronze medal – third place	1991 Macau	Men's doubles
Bronze medal – third place	1992 Guangzhou	Men's doubles
Sudirman Cup
Bronze medal – third place	1993 Birmingham	Mixed team
Thomas Cup
Gold medal – first place	1988 Kuala Lumpur	Men's team
Gold medal – first place	1990 Nagoya & Tokyo	Men's team
Bronze medal – third place	1994 Jakarta	Men's team
Asian Games
Bronze medal – third place	1994 Hiroshima	Men's doubles
Bronze medal – third place	1994 Hiroshima	Men's team
Asian Championships
Gold medal – first place	1994 Shanghai	Men's doubles
Silver medal – second place	1991 Kuala Lumpur	Men's doubles
Silver medal – second place	1993 Hong Kong	Men's team
Asian Cup
Bronze medal – third place	1991 Jakarta	Men's doubles

Chen Hongyong (born 1 May 1966) is a Chinese badminton player. He competed in the men's doubles tournament at the 1992 Summer Olympics.

== Achievements ==
=== World Championships ===
Men's doubles
Year	Venue	Partner	Opponent	Score	Result
1989	Senayan Sports Complex; Jakarta, Indonesia	(China) Chen Kang	(China) Li Yongbo (China) Tian Bingyi	3–15, 12–15	Silver
1993	National Indoor Arena; Birmingham, England	(China) Chen Kang	(Malaysia) Cheah Soon Kit (Malaysia) Soo Beng Kiang	6–15, 5–15	Bronze

=== World Cup ===
Men's doubles
Year	Venue	Partner	Opponent	Score	Result
1991	Macau Forum, Macau	(China) Chen Kang	(Malaysia) Razif Sidek (Malaysia) Jalani Sidek	15–10, 7–15, 9–15	Bronze
1992	Guangdong Gymnasium; Guangzhou, China	(China) Chen Kang	(Indonesia) Rexy Mainaky (Indonesia) Ricky Subagja	11–15, 11–15	Bronze
1993	Phan Dinh Phung Indoor Stadium; Ho Chi Minh City, Vietnam	(China) Chen Kang	(Indonesia) Rexy Mainaky (Indonesia) Ricky Subagja	7–15, 15–12, 9–15	Silver

=== Asian Games ===
Men's doubles
Year	Venue	Partner	Opponent	Score	Result
1994	Tsuru Memorial Gymnasium; Hiroshima, Japan	(China) Chen Kang	(Indonesia) Rexy Mainaky (Indonesia) Ricky Subagja	5–15, 10–15	Bronze

=== Asian Championships ===
Men's doubles
Year	Venue	Partner	Opponent	Score	Result
1991	Cheras Indoor Stadium; Kuala Lumpur, Malaysia	(China) Chen Kang	(South Korea) Park Joo-bong (South Korea) Kim Moon-soo	12–15, 10–15	Silver
1994	Shanghai Gymnasium; Shanghai, China	(China) Chen Kang	(Malaysia) Tan Kim Her (Malaysia) Yap Kim Hock	15–10, 15–11	Gold

=== Asian Cup ===
Men's doubles
Year	Venue	Partner	Opponent	Score	Result
1991	Istora Senayan; Jakarta, Indonesia	(China) Chen Kang	(Malaysia) Cheah Soon Kit (Malaysia) Soo Beng Kiang	5–15, 8–15	Bronze

=== IBF World Grand Prix ===
The World Badminton Grand Prix sanctioned by International Badminton Federation (IBF) since from 1983 to 2006.

Men's doubles
Year	Tournament	Partner	Opponent	Score	Result
1986	China Open	(China) Huang Zhen	(China) Li Yongbo (China) Tian Bingyi	6–15, 8–15	(silver) Runner-up
1988	German Open	(China) Chen Kang	(Denmark) Steen Fladberg (Denmark) Jan Paulsen	8–15, 15–6, 13–18	(silver) Runner-up
1988	Swedish Open	(China) Chen Kang	(China) Li Yongbo (China) Tian Bingyi	Walkover	(silver) Runner-up
1988	Indonesia Open	(China) Chen Kang	(Malaysia) Razif Sidek (Malaysia) Jalani Sidek	18–16, 5–15, 2–15	(silver) Runner-up
1988	China Open	(China) Chen Kang	(China) Li Yongbo (China) Tian Bingyi	15–13, 8–15, 3–15	(silver) Runner-up
1990	Thailand Open	(China) Chen Kang	(South Korea) Park Joo-bong (South Korea) Kim Moon-soo	6–15, 15–12, 10–15	(silver) Runner-up
1992	Japan Open	(China) Chen Kang	(China) Li Yongbo (China) Tian Bingyi	15–3, 15–4	(gold) Winner
1992	Malaysia Open	(China) Chen Kang	(Malaysia) Cheah Soon Kit (Malaysia) Soo Beng Kiang	14–17, 8–15	(silver) Runner-up
1992	Singapore Open	(China) Chen Kang	(Thailand) Pramote Teerawiwatana (Thailand) Sakrapee Thongsari	15–11, 15–9	(gold) Winner
1993	All England Open	(China) Chen Kang	(Denmark) Jon Holst-Christensen (Denmark) Thomas Lund	2–15, 11–15	(silver) Runner-up
1993	Japan Open	(China) Chen Kang	(Thailand) Pramote Teerawiwatana (Thailand) Sakrapee Thongsari	18–16, 12–15, 15–3	(gold) Winner
1993	China Open	(China) Chen Kang	(Indonesia) Rudy Gunawan (Indonesia) Bambang Suprianto	3–15, 15–12, 12–15	(silver) Runner-up

=== IBF International ===
Men's doubles
Year	Tournament	Partner	Opponent	Score	Result
1984	U.S. Open	(China) Zhang Qingwu	(China) Chen Kang (China) Huang Zhen	12–15, 15–5, 15–7	(gold) Winner
1991	Finnish Open	(China) Chen Kang	(China) Huang Zhanzhong (China) Zheng Yumin	10–15, 15–12, 15–12	(gold) Winner
1992	Swedish Open	(China) Chen Kang	(Sweden) Peter Axelsson (Sweden) Pär-Gunnar Jönsson	15–12, 15–4	(gold) Winner
1993	Canadian Open	(China) Chen Kang	(Denmark) Jon Holst-Christensen (Denmark) Thomas Lund	7–15, 15–7, 4–15	(silver) Runner-up
