= 1991 Badminton Asian Cup =

Badminton championships

Asian Cup 1991
Tournament information
- Location: Istora Senayan, Jakarta, Indonesia
- Dates: December 18–December 22

The 1991 Badminton Asian Cup was the first edition of Badminton Asian Cup. It was held in Istora Senayan indoor stadium, Jakarta, Indonesia from 18 to 22 December with total prize money of US$100,000. The main sponsor of this tournament was Cathay Pacific. Malaysian team won titles in Men's singles and doubles event, while South Korea won Women's doubles and Mixed doubles disciplines. Chinese Tang won the Women's singles title.

== Medalists ==
Event	Gold	Silver	Bronze
Men's singles	(Malaysia) Rashid Sidek	(Indonesia) Bambang Suprianto	(Indonesia) Joko Suprianto
Men's singles	(Malaysia) Rashid Sidek	(Indonesia) Bambang Suprianto	(Indonesia) Fung Permadi
Women's singles	(China) Tang Jiuhong	(South Korea) Bang Soo-hyun	(Thailand) Somharuthai Jaroensiri
Women's singles	(China) Tang Jiuhong	(South Korea) Bang Soo-hyun	(Indonesia) Yuliani Sentosa
Men's doubles	(Malaysia) Cheah Soon Kit (Malaysia) Soo Beng Kiang	(Indonesia) Rexy Mainaky (Indonesia) Ricky Subagja	(China) Chen Hongyong (China) Chen Kang
Men's doubles	(Malaysia) Cheah Soon Kit (Malaysia) Soo Beng Kiang	(Indonesia) Rexy Mainaky (Indonesia) Ricky Subagja	(China) Huang Zhanzhong (China) Zheng Yumin
Women's doubles	(South Korea) Chung So-young (South Korea) Hwang Hye-young	(Japan) Kimiko Jinnai (Japan) Hisako Mori	(Indonesia) Erma Sulistianingsih (Indonesia) Rosiana Tendean
Women's doubles	(South Korea) Chung So-young (South Korea) Hwang Hye-young	(Japan) Kimiko Jinnai (Japan) Hisako Mori	(China) Yao Fen (China) Lin Yanfen
Mixed doubles	(South Korea) Shon Jin-hwan (South Korea) Gil Young-ah	(Indonesia) Aryono Miranat (Indonesia) Eliza Nathanael	(Malaysia) Ong Ewe Chye (Malaysia) Tan Sui Hoon
Mixed doubles	(South Korea) Shon Jin-hwan (South Korea) Gil Young-ah	(Indonesia) Aryono Miranat (Indonesia) Eliza Nathanael	(Thailand) Siripong Siripool (Thailand) Ladawan Mulasartsatorn

== Results ==
=== Semifinals ===
Discipline	Winner	Finalist	Score
Men's singles	(Malaysia) Rashid Sidek	(Indonesia) Joko Suprianto	15–8, 6–15, 18–14
Men's singles	(Indonesia) Bambang Suprianto	(Indonesia) Fung Permadi	15–7, 15–11
Women's singles	(China) Tang Jiuhong	(Thailand) Somharuthai Jaroensiri	11–5, 11–9
Women's singles	(South Korea) Bang Soo-hyun	(Indonesia) Yuliani Sentosa	6–11, 11–8, 11–4
Men's doubles	(Malaysia) Cheah Soon Kit (Malaysia) Soo Beng Kiang	(China) Chen Hongyong (China) Chen Kang	15–5, 15–8
Men's doubles	(Indonesia) Rexy Mainaky (Indonesia) Ricky Subagja	(China) Huang Zhanzhong (China) Zheng Yumin	15–4, 15–8
Women's doubles	(South Korea) Chung So-young (South Korea) Hwang Hye-young	(Indonesia) Erma Sulistianingsih (Indonesia) Rosiana Tendean	15–3, 5–15, 15–11
Women's doubles	(Japan) Kimiko Jinnai (Japan) Hisako Mori	(China) Yao Fen (China) Lin Yanfen	10–15, 17–14, 15–1
Mixed doubles	(South Korea) Shon Jin-hwan (South Korea) Gil Young-ah	(Malaysia) Ong Ewe Chye (Malaysia) Tan Sui Hoon	15–4, 15–4
Mixed doubles	(Indonesia) Aryono Miranat (Indonesia) Eliza Nathanael	(Thailand) Siripong Siripool (Thailand) Ladawan Mulasartsatorn	11–15, 17–14, 15–12

=== Finals ===
Discipline	Winner	Finalist	Score
Men's singles	(Malaysia) Rashid Sidek	(Indonesia) Bambang Suprianto	15–10, 15–11
Women's singles	(China) Tang Jiuhong	(South Korea) Bang Soo-hyun	11–7, 6–11, 11–4
Men's doubles	(Malaysia) Cheah Soon Kit (Malaysia) Soo Beng Kiang	(Indonesia) Rexy Mainaky (Indonesia) Ricky Subagja	17–16, 15–5
Women's doubles	(South Korea) Chung So-young (South Korea) Hwang Hye-young	(Japan) Kimiko Jinnai (Japan) Hisako Mori	15–13, 15–1
Mixed doubles	(South Korea) Shon Jin-hwan (South Korea) Gil Young-ah	(Indonesia) Aryono Miranat (Indonesia) Eliza Nathanael	15–5, 8–15, 15–7

== Medal table ==
Rank	Nation	Gold	Silver	Bronze	Total
1	South Korea	2	1	0	3
2	Malaysia (MAS)	2	0	1	3
3	China (CHN)	1	0	3	4
4	Indonesia (INA)	0	3	4	7
5	Japan	0	1	0	1
6	Thailand (THA)	0	0	2	2
Totals (6 entries)		5	5	10	20
