= Tan Kim Her =

Malaysian badminton player

Tan Kim Her 陈金和

Personal information
- Born: November 11, 1971 (age 55)
- Height: 1.74 m (5 ft 9 in)
- Weight: 68 kg (150 lb)

Sport
- Country: Malaysia
- Sport: Badminton
- Handedness: Right
- Event: Men's doubles

Men's doubles
- BWF profile
Medal record
Men's badminton
Representing Malaysia
World Cup
Bronze medal – third place	1994 Ho Chi Minh	Men's doubles
Thomas Cup
Silver medal – second place	1994 Jakarta	Team
Silver medal – second place	1998 Hong Kong	Team
Commonwealth Games
Silver medal – second place	1994 Victoria	Mixed team
Bronze medal – third place	1994 Victoria	Men's doubles
Asian Games
Bronze medal – third place	1994 Hiroshima	Men's team
Asian Championships
Silver medal – second place	1994 Beijing	Men's doubles
Bronze medal – third place	1991 Kuala Lumpur	Mixed doubles
Bronze medal – third place	1992 Kuala Lumpur	Mixed doubles
Asian Cup
Bronze medal – third place	1994 Beijing	Mixed doubles
Bronze medal – third place	1994 Beijing	Men's doubles
Asia Cup
Silver medal – second place	1997 Jakarta	Men's team
Southeast Asian Games
Silver medal – second place	1993 Singapore	Men's team
Silver medal – second place	1995 Chiang Mai	Men's team
Silver medal – second place	1997 Jakarta	Men's team
Bronze medal – third place	1993 Singapore	Men's doubles
Bronze medal – third place	1993 Singapore	Mixed doubles

Tan Kim Her (Chinese: 陳金和; Jyutping: Can4 Gam1 Wo4; Pe̍h-ōe-jī: Tân Kim-hô, born November 11, 1971) is a Malaysian coach and former badminton player. In the past few years, he has coached Indian and Japanese doubles players.

== Career ==
Kim Her competed in badminton at the 1996 Summer Olympics in men's doubles with Soo Beng Kiang. They defeated the no.3 seeds Rudy Gunawan and Bambang Suprianto of Indonesia in the last 16. In the semi-final, Kim Her and Beng Kiang lost to the eventual gold medallist, Rexy Mainaky and Ricky Subagja of Indonesia. In the bronze medal match, the duo lost hard fought match also to the Indonesian pair, Antonius Ariantho/Denny Kantono.

== Achievements ==
=== World Cup ===
Men's doubles
Year	Venue	Partner	Opponent	Score	Result
1994	Phan Đình Phùng Indoor Stadium; Ho Chi Minh City, Vietnam	(Malaysia) Yap Kim Hock	(Malaysia) Cheah Soon Kit (Malaysia) Soo Beng Kiang	15–6, 11–15, 8–15	Bronze

=== Asian Championships ===
Men's doubles
Year	Venue	Partner	Opponent	Score	Result
1994	Shanghai Gymnasium; Shanghai, China	(Malaysia) Yap Kim Hock	(China) Chen Hongyong (China) Chen Kang	10–15, 11–15	Silver

Mixed doubles
Year	Venue	Partner	Opponent	Score	Result
1991	Cheras Indoor Stadium; Kuala Lumpur, Malaysia	(Malaysia) Tan Sui Hoon	(South Korea) Park Joo-bong (South Korea) Chung Myung-hee	3–15, 4–15	Bronze
1992	Cheras Indoor Stadium, Kuala Lumpur, Malaysia	(Malaysia) Tan Sui Hoon	(Indonesia) Joko Mardianto (Indonesia) Sri Untari	6–15, 4–15	Bronze

=== Asian Cup ===
Men's doubles
Year	Venue	Partner	Opponent	Score	Result
1994	Beijing Gymnasium; Beijing, China	(Malaysia) Yap Kim Hock	(Malaysia) Cheah Soon Kit (Malaysia) Soo Beng Kiang	18–17, 0–15, 10–15	Bronze

Mixed doubles
Year	Venue	Partner	Opponent	Score	Result
1994	Beijing Gymnasium; Beijing, China	(Malaysia) Tan Lee Wai	(China) Liu Jianjun (China) Ge Fei	2–15, 2–15	Bronze

=== Southeast Asian Games ===
Men's doubles
Year	Venue	Partner	Opponent	Score	Result
1993	Singapore Badminton Hall, Singapore	(Malaysia) Yap Kim Hock	(Indonesia) Ricky Subagja (Indonesia) Rexy Mainaky	17–15, 7–15, 14–17	Bronze

Mixed doubles
Year	Venue	Partner	Opponent	Score	Result
1993	Singapore Badminton Hall, Singapore	(Malaysia) Tan Lee Wai	(Indonesia) Denny Kantono (Indonesia) Minarti Timur	5–15, 2–15	Bronze

=== Commonwealth Games ===
Men's doubles
Year	Venue	Partner	Opponent	Score	Result
1994	McKinnon Gym, University of Victoria, British Columbia, Canada	(Malaysia) Ong Ewe Hock	(England) Simon Archer (England) Chris Hunt	1–15, 7–15	Bronze

=== IBF World Grand Prix ===
The World Badminton Grand Prix sanctioned by International Badminton Federation (IBF) from 1983 to 2006.

Men's doubles
Year	Tournament	Partner	Opponent	Score	Result
1992	Chinese Taipei Open	(Malaysia) Jalani Sidek	(Malaysia) Cheah Soon Kit (Malaysia) Soo Beng Kiang	7–15, 4–15	(silver) Runner-up
1992	Dutch Open	(Malaysia) Yap Kim Hock	(Netherlands) Chris Bruil (Netherlands) Ron Michels	15–9, 15–10	(gold) Winner
1994	Swiss Open	(Malaysia) Yap Kim Hock	(Sweden) Pär-Gunnar Jönsson (Sweden) Peter Axelsson	7–15, 8–15	(silver) Runner-up
1994	China Open	(Malaysia) Yap Kim Hock	(China) Huang Zhanzhong (China) Jiang Xin	10–15, 8–15	(silver) Runner-up

=== IBF International ===
Men's doubles
Year	Tournament	Partner	Opponent	Score	Result
1991	French Open	(Malaysia) Yap Kim Hock	(Malaysia) Yap Yee Hup (Malaysia) Yap Yee Guan	7–15, 11–15	(silver) Runner-up

== Coaching ==
Tan became a coach after his playing career, coaching the Malaysian junior squad for six years. Then, he became the first Malaysian to coach abroad when he joined the South Korean national team in 2005. In 2007, he joined the England national team. In 2010, he left and returned to coach in his homeland Malaysia. In 2015, he was appointed as an Indian men's doubles coach, before resigning in March 2019. He was credited for the rise of world No. 1 men's doubles Satwiksairaj Rankireddy-Chirag Shetty. He then joined the Japanese national team as men's doubles coach, guiding world No. 4 Takuro Hoki-Yugo Kobayashi to the world title in 2021.
