= Badminton at the 1994 Asian Games =

Badminton events

- Venue: Tsuru Memorial Gymnasium
- Dates: 7–15 October
- Competitors: 112 from 11 nations

Badminton was contested at the 1994 Asian Games in Tsuru Memorial Gymnasium, Hiroshima, Japan from October 7 to October 15, 1994.

Singles, doubles, and team events were contested for both men and women. Mixed doubles were also contested.

== Medalists ==
Event	Gold	Silver	Bronze
Men's singles	Hariyanto Arbi; Indonesia	Joko Suprianto; Indonesia	Kim Hak-kyun; South Korea
Men's singles	Hariyanto Arbi; Indonesia	Joko Suprianto; Indonesia	Dong Jiong; China
Men's doubles	Indonesia; Rexy Mainaky; Ricky Subagja	Malaysia; Cheah Soon Kit; Soo Beng Kiang	China; Chen Kang; Chen Hongyong
Men's doubles	Indonesia; Rexy Mainaky; Ricky Subagja	Malaysia; Cheah Soon Kit; Soo Beng Kiang	China; Jiang Xin; Huang Zhanzhong
Men's team	Indonesia; Hariyanto Arbi; Rudy Gunawan; Rexy Mainaky; Ricky Subagja; Bambang Suprianto; Joko Suprianto; Hermawan Susanto; Ardy Wiranata	South Korea; Ahn Jae-chang; Ha Tae-kwon; Kang Kyung-jin; Kim Hak-kyun; Lee Kwang-jin; Lee Suk-ho; Park Sung-woo; Yoo Yong-sung	China; Chen Hongyong; Chen Kang; Chen Xingdong; Dong Jiong; Huang Zhanzhong; Jiang Xin; Lin Liwen; Liu Jianjun
Men's team	Indonesia; Hariyanto Arbi; Rudy Gunawan; Rexy Mainaky; Ricky Subagja; Bambang Suprianto; Joko Suprianto; Hermawan Susanto; Ardy Wiranata	South Korea; Ahn Jae-chang; Ha Tae-kwon; Kang Kyung-jin; Kim Hak-kyun; Lee Kwang-jin; Lee Suk-ho; Park Sung-woo; Yoo Yong-sung	Malaysia; Cheah Soon Kit; Muralidesan Krishnamurthy; Ong Ewe Hock; Pang Chen; Soo Beng Kiang; Tan Kim Her; Yap Kim Hock
Women's singles	Bang Soo-hyun; South Korea	Hisako Mizui; Japan	Susi Susanti; Indonesia
Women's singles	Bang Soo-hyun; South Korea	Hisako Mizui; Japan	Ye Zhaoying; China
Women's doubles	South Korea; Shim Eun-jung; Jang Hye-ock	South Korea; Chung So-young; Gil Young-ah	China; Ge Fei; Gu Jun
Women's doubles	South Korea; Shim Eun-jung; Jang Hye-ock	South Korea; Chung So-young; Gil Young-ah	Japan; Tomomi Matsuo; Kyoko Sasage
Women's team	South Korea; Bang Soo-hyun; Chung So-young; Gil Young-ah; Jang Hye-ock; Kim Ji-hyun; Lee Heung-soon; Ra Kyung-min; Shim Eun-jung	Indonesia; Finarsih; Yuni Kartika; Eliza Nathanael; Ika Heny Nursanti; Zelin Resiana; Yuliani Sentosa; Susi Susanti; Lili Tampi	Japan; Tokiko Hirota; Takako Ida; Yuko Koike; Tomomi Matsuo; Aiko Miyamura; Hisako Mizui; Yasuko Mizui; Kyoko Sasage
Women's team	South Korea; Bang Soo-hyun; Chung So-young; Gil Young-ah; Jang Hye-ock; Kim Ji-hyun; Lee Heung-soon; Ra Kyung-min; Shim Eun-jung	Indonesia; Finarsih; Yuni Kartika; Eliza Nathanael; Ika Heny Nursanti; Zelin Resiana; Yuliani Sentosa; Susi Susanti; Lili Tampi	China; Chen Ying; Ge Fei; Gu Jun; Han Jingna; Tang Jiuhong; Wu Yuhong; Yao Yan; Ye Zhaoying
Mixed doubles	South Korea; Yoo Yong-sung; Chung So-young	South Korea; Kang Kyung-jin; Jang Hye-ock	Malaysia; Yap Kim Hock; Lee Wai Leng
Mixed doubles	South Korea; Yoo Yong-sung; Chung So-young	South Korea; Kang Kyung-jin; Jang Hye-ock	Indonesia; Rudy Gunawan; Eliza Nathanael

== Medal table ==
Rank	Nation	Gold	Silver	Bronze	Total
1	South Korea (KOR)	4	3	1	8
2	Indonesia (INA)	3	2	2	7
3	Japan (JPN)	0	1	2	3
3	Malaysia (MAS)	0	1	2	3
5	China (CHN)	0	0	7	7
Totals (5 entries)		7	7	14	28

== Participating nations ==
A total of 112 athletes from 11 nations competed in badminton at the 1994 Asian Games:

- Cambodia (3)
- China (16)
- Chinese Taipei (8)
- Hong Kong (8)
- Indonesia (16)
- Japan (16)
- Malaysia (9)
- Maldives (4)
- Singapore (3)
- South Korea (16)
- Thailand (13)
