= Jiang Xin (badminton) =

Chinese badminton player

Jiang Xin 蔣欣
Personal information
- Born: 18 January 1969 (age 57)
- Height: 1.82 m (6 ft 0 in)
- Weight: 81 kg (179 lb)

Sport
- Country: Australia
- Sport: Badminton
- Handedness: Right
- Event: Men's & mixed doubles

Men's & mixed doubles
- BWF profile
Medal record
Men's badminton
Representing China
World Cup
Bronze medal – third place	1995 Jakarta	Mixed doubles
Sudirman Cup
Gold medal – first place	1995 Lausanne	Mixed team
Thomas Cup
Bronze medal – third place	1996 Hong Kong	Men's team
Asian Games
Bronze medal – third place	1994 Hiroshima	Men's doubles
Bronze medal – third place	1994 Hiroshima	Men's team
Asian Championships
Silver medal – second place	1995 Beijing	Men's doubles
Silver medal – second place	1995 Beijing	Mixed doubles
Bronze medal – third place	1994 Shanghai	Men's doubles
Asian Cup
Gold medal – first place	1995 Qingdao	Men's doubles
East Asian Games
Gold medal – first place	1993 Shanghai	Men's doubles
Gold medal – first place	1993 Shanghai	Men's team

Jiang Xin (Chinese: 蔣欣; born 18 January 1969) is a Chinese former badminton player who later moved to Australia and ran a badminton school in Melbourne. He was the bronze medalists at the 1994 Asian Games in the men's doubles and team events. Jiang competed at the 1996 Summer Olympics in the men's doubles teamed-up with Huang Zhanzhong.

== Achievements ==
=== World Cup ===
Mixed doubles
Year	Venue	Partner	Opponent	Score	Result
1995	Istora Senayan; Jakarta, Indonesia	(China) Zhang Jin	(Indonesia) Tri Kusharjanto (Indonesia) Minarti Timur	3–15, 10–15	Bronze

=== Asian Games ===
Men's doubles
Year	Venue	Partner	Opponent	Score	Result
1994	Tsuru Memorial Gymnasium; Hiroshima, Japan	(China) Huang Zhanzhong	(Malaysia) Cheah Soon Kit (Malaysia) Soo Beng Kiang	9–15, 5–15	Bronze

=== Asian Championships ===
Men's doubles
Year	Venue	Partner	Opponent	Score	Result
1994	Shanghai Gymnasium; Shanghai, China	(China) Huang Zhanzhong	(Malaysia) Tan Kim Her (Malaysia) Yap Kim Hock	4–15, 3–15	Bronze
1995	Olympic Sports Center Gymnasium; Beijing, China	(China) Huang Zhanzhong	(Malaysia) Cheah Soon Kit (Malaysia) Yap Kim Hock	15–7, 8–15, 7–15	Silver

Mixed doubles
Year	Venue	Partner	Opponent	Score	Result
1995	Olympic Sports Center Gymnasium; Beijing, China	(China) Zhang Jin	(China) Liu Jianjun (China) Ge Fei	4–15, 15–12, 5–15	Silver

=== Asian Cup ===
Men's doubles
Year	Venue	Partner	Opponent	Score	Result
1995	Xinxing Gymnasium; Qingdao, China	(China) Huang Zhanzhong	(Malaysia) Cheah Soon Kit (Malaysia) Yap Kim Hock	15–10, 15–11	Gold

=== East Asian Games ===
Men's doubles
Year	Venue	Partner	Opponent	Score	Result
1993	Shanghai, China	(China) Yu Qi	(China) Huang Zhanzhong (China) Liu Di	15–12, 18–15	Gold

=== IBF World Grand Prix ===
The World Badminton Grand Prix sanctioned by International Badminton Federation (IBF) since from 1983 to 2006.

Men's doubles
Year	Tournament	Partner	Opponent	Score	Result
1993	Dutch Open	(China) Yu Qi	(Malaysia) Cheah Soon Kit (Malaysia) Soo Beng Kiang	4–15, 14–17	(silver) Runner-up
1994	China Open	(China) Huang Zhanzhong	(Malaysia) Tan Kim Her (Malaysia) Yap Kim Hock	15–10, 15–8	(gold) Winner
1995	U.S. Open	(China) Huang Zhanzhong	(Indonesia) Rudy Gunawan (Indonesia) Bambang Suprianto	3–15, 10–15	(silver) Runner-up
1995	China Open	(China) Huang Zhanzhong	(Denmark) Jon Holst-Christensen (Denmark) Thomas Lund	15–8, 15–11	(gold) Winner
1995	Thailand Open	(China) Huang Zhanzhong	(Malaysia) Cheah Soon Kit (Malaysia) Yap Kim Hock	15–9, 15–11	(gold) Winner

Mixed doubles
Year	Tournament	Partner	Opponent	Score	Result
1994	Indonesia Open	(China) Zhang Jin	(Indonesia) Flandy Limpele (Indonesia) Dede Hasanah	15–3, 15–11	(gold) Winner

=== IBF International ===
Men's doubles
Year	Tournament	Partner	Opponent	Score	Result
2000	Victoria International	(China) Dong Jiong	(Poland) Michał Łogosz (Poland) Robert Mateusiak	10–15, 15–17	(silver) Runner-up
