= Bambang Suprianto =

Indonesian badminton player (born 1969)

Personal information
- Born: 20 February 1969 (age 57) Surakarta, Central Java, Indonesia
- Height: 1.73 m (5 ft 8 in)

Sport
- Country: Indonesia
- Sport: Badminton
- Handedness: Right

Men's & mixed doubles
- Highest ranking: 1 (MD with Rudy Gunawan April 1994)
- BWF profile
Medal record
Men's badminton
Representing Indonesia
World Cup
Silver medal – second place	1994 Ho Chi Minh	Men's doubles
Sudirman Cup
Silver medal – second place	1991 Copenhagen	Mixed team
Silver medal – second place	1993 Birmingham	Mixed team
Silver medal – second place	1995 Lausanne	Mixed team
Silver medal – second place	2001 Seville	Mixed team
Bronze medal – third place	1999 Copenhagen	Mixed team
Thomas Cup
Gold medal – first place	1994 Jakarta	Men's team
Gold medal – first place	1996 Hong Kong	Men's team
Gold medal – first place	2002 Guangzhou	Men's team
Asian Games
Gold medal – first place	1994 Hiroshima	Men's team
Silver medal – second place	2002 Busan	Men's team
Asian Championships
Gold medal – first place	2000 Jakarta	Mixed doubles
Gold medal – first place	2001 Manila	Men's doubles
Silver medal – second place	2001 Manila	Mixed doubles
Bronze medal – third place	1998 Bangkok	Mixed doubles
Bronze medal – third place	1999 Kuala Lumpur	Mixed doubles
Asian Cup
Silver medal – second place	1991 Jakarta	Men's singles
Bronze medal – third place	1995 Qingdao	Men's doubles
SEA Games
Silver medal – second place	2001 Kuala Lumpur	Men's doubles
Silver medal – second place	2001 Kuala Lumpur	Mixed doubles
Silver medal – second place	2001 Kuala Lumpur	Men's team

Bambang Suprianto (born 20 February 1969) is a retired badminton player from Indonesia.

== Career ==
A durable all around player who won singles at the Singapore Open in 1991, Suprianto's greatest success came in doubles events. In the mid-1990s he and fellow countryman Rudy Gunawan formed one of the world's leading men's doubles teams. They won several top tier international titles, including the 1994 All-England Championship, but could not quite keep pace with countrymen Rexy Mainaky and Ricky Subagja who became the decade's most successful pair. Suprianto was a member of Indonesia's world champion Thomas Cup (men's international) teams in 1994, 1996 and 2002.

After Rudy Gunawan's retirement, Suprianto focused on mixed doubles and continued his high level of play by winning international titles with a variety of partners. He and Zelin Resiana narrowly missed a medal at the 2000 Olympics in Sydney, Australia. Late in his international career, Suprianto teamed with another mixed doubles specialist, Tri Kusharjanto to gain a very unexpected men's doubles victory at the 2001 Asian Championships over the reigning Olympic champions Tony Gunawan and Candra Wijaya in the final, and previously in 2000 won the mixed doubles event with Minarti Timur.

== Personal life ==
Bambang joined Purnama Badminton Club owned by the father of Joko Suprianto during his youth. As a result of their close association, they were sometimes mistaken for siblings despite having no familial relationship.

== Achievements ==
=== World Cup ===
Men's doubles
Year	Venue	Partner	Opponent	Score	Result
1994	Phan Đình Phùng Indoor Stadium; Ho Chi Minh City, Vietnam	(Indonesia) Rudy Gunawan	(Malaysia) Cheah Soon Kit (Malaysia) Soo Beng Kiang	13–18, 15–2, 16–17	Silver

=== Asian Championships ===
Men's doubles
Year	Venue	Partner	Opponent	Score	Result
2001	PhilSports Arena, Manila, Philippines	(Indonesia) Tri Kusharjanto	(Indonesia) Tony Gunawan (Indonesia) Candra Wijaya	8–15, 15–13, 15–13	Gold

Mixed doubles
Year	Venue	Partner	Opponent	Score	Result
1998	Nimibutr Stadium, Bangkok, Thailand	(Indonesia) Zelin Resiana	(China) Sun Jun (China) Ge Fei	5–15, 15–17	Bronze
1999	Kuala Lumpur Badminton Stadium, Kuala Lumpur, Malaysia	(Indonesia) Minarti Timur	(China) Liu Yong (China) Ge Fei	2–15, 5–15	Bronze
2000	Istora Senayan, Jakarta, Indonesia	(Indonesia) Minarti Timur	(Indonesia) Wahyu Agung (Indonesia) Emma Ermawati	15–10, 15–12	Gold
2001	PhilSports Arena, Manila, Philippines	(Indonesia) Minarti Timur	(South Korea) Kim Dong-moon (South Korea) Ra Kyung-min	15–11, 4–15, 3–15	Silver

=== Asian Cup ===
Men's singles
Year	Venue	Opponent	Score	Result
1991	Istora Senayan, Jakarta, Indonesia	(Malaysia) Rashid Sidek	10–15, 11–15	Silver

Men's doubles
Year	Venue	Partner	Opponent	Score	Result
1995	Xinxing Gymnasium, Qingdao, China	(Indonesia) Rudy Gunawan	(Malaysia) Cheah Soon Kit (Malaysia) Yap Kim Hock	6–15, 14–17	Bronze

=== SEA Games ===
Men's doubles
Year	Venue	Partner	Opponent	Score	Result
2001	Malawati Stadium, Selangor, Malaysia	(Indonesia) Tony Gunawan	(Indonesia) Sigit Budiarto (Indonesia) Candra Wijaya	4–15, 6–15	Silver

Mixed doubles
Year	Venue	Partner	Opponent	Score	Result
2001	Malawati Stadium, Selangor, Malaysia	(Indonesia) Emma Ermawati	(Indonesia) Nova Widianto (Indonesia) Vita Marissa	15–3, 7–15, 15–17	Silver

=== IBF World Grand Prix ===
The World Badminton Grand Prix sanctioned by International Badminton Federation (IBF) from 1983 to 2006.

Men's singles
Year	Tournament	Opponent	Score	Result
1990	Canada Open	(Indonesia) Fung Permadi	4–15, 2–15	(silver) Runner-up
1990	U.S. Open	(Indonesia) Fung Permadi	10–15, 8–15	(silver) Runner-up
1991	Singapore Open	(Indonesia) Fung Permadi	15–9, 15–8	(gold) Winner

Men's doubles
Year	Tournament	Partner	Opponent	Score	Result
1992	German Open	(Indonesia) Rudy Gunawan	(Denmark) Jon Holst-Christensen (Denmark) Thomas Lund	6–15, 15–2, 9–15	(silver) Runner-up
1993	Thailand Open	(Indonesia) Rudy Gunawan	(Indonesia) Imay Hendra (Indonesia) Dicky Purwotjugiono	15–5, 15–7	(gold) Winner
1993	China Open	(Indonesia) Rudy Gunawan	(China) Chen Hongyong (China) Chen Kang	15–12, 15–12	(gold) Winner
1993	World Grand Prix Finals	(Indonesia) Rudy Gunawan	(Indonesia) Rexy Mainaky (Indonesia) Ricky Subagja	11–15, 15–10, 15–9	(gold) Winner
1994	Chinese Taipei Open	(Indonesia) Rudy Gunawan	(Denmark) Jens Eriksen (Denmark) Christian Jakobsen	15–1, 15–8	(gold) Winner
1994	All England Open	(Indonesia) Rudy Gunawan	(Indonesia) Rexy Mainaky (Indonesia) Ricky Subagja	15–12, 15–12	(gold) Winner
1994	Indonesia Open	(Indonesia) Rudy Gunawan	(Indonesia) Rexy Mainaky (Indonesia) Ricky Subagja	15–10, 4–15, 15–18	(silver) Runner-up
1994	Hong Kong Open	(Indonesia) Rudy Gunawan	(Indonesia) Rexy Mainaky (Indonesia) Ricky Subagja	12–15, 17–14, 7–15	(silver) Runner-up
1994	World Grand Prix Finals	(Indonesia) Rudy Gunawan	(Indonesia) Rexy Mainaky (Indonesia) Ricky Subagja	10–15, 7–15	(silver) Runner-up
1995	Japan Open	(Indonesia) Rudy Gunawan	(Indonesia) Rexy Mainaky (Indonesia) Ricky Subagja	8–15, 9–15	(silver) Runner-up
1995	Indonesia Open	(Indonesia) Rudy Gunawan	(Indonesia) Antonius Ariantho (Indonesia) Denny Kantono	15–12, 15–9	(gold) Winner
1995	U.S. Open	(Indonesia) Rudy Gunawan	(China) Huang Zhanzhong (China) Jiang Xin	15–3, 15–10	(gold) Winner
1995	Hong Kong Open	(Indonesia) Rudy Gunawan	(South Korea) Ha Tae-kwon (South Korea) Kang Kyung-jin	15–17, 15–12, 3–15	(silver) Runner-up
1995	World Grand Prix Finals	(Indonesia) Rudy Gunawan	(Malaysia) Cheah Soon Kit (Malaysia) Yap Kim Hock	18–13, 2–15, 12–15	(silver) Runner-up
1996	Japan Open	(Indonesia) Rudy Gunawan	(Indonesia) Rexy Mainaky (Indonesia) Ricky Subagja	8–15, 15–12, 12–15	(silver) Runner-up
2002	Chinese Taipei Open	(Indonesia) Candra Wijaya	(South Korea) Ha Tae-kwon (South Korea) Kim Dong-moon	9–15, 15–13, 3–15	(silver) Runner-up

Mixed doubles
Year	Tournament	Partner	Opponent	Score	Result
1997	Indonesia Open	(Indonesia) Rosalina Riseu	(Indonesia) Tri Kusharjanto (Indonesia) Minarti Timur	11–15, 6–15	(silver) Runner-up
1997	Singapore Open	(Indonesia) Rosalina Riseu	(South Korea) Kim Dong-moon (South Korea) Park So-yun	15–13, 15–9	(gold) Winner
1997	U.S. Open	(Indonesia) Rosalina Riseu	(South Korea) Kim Dong-moon (South Korea) Ra Kyung-min	1–15, 3–15	(silver) Runner-up
1997	Vietnam Open	(Indonesia) Rosalina Riseu	(South Korea) Lee Dong-soo (South Korea) Park Soo-yun	15–5, 15–10	(gold) Winner
1999	Chinese Taipei Open	(Indonesia) Zelin Resiana	(China) Liu Yong (China) Ge Fei	12–15, 10–15	(silver) Runner-up
1999	Indonesia Open	(Indonesia) Zelin Resiana	(Indonesia) Tri Kusharjanto (Indonesia) Minarti Timur	3–15, 4–15	(silver) Runner-up
2001	Japan Open	(Indonesia) Minarti Timur	(China) Liu Yong (China) Cheng Jiao	15–6, 14–17, 15–5	(gold) Winner
2001	Malaysia Open	(Indonesia) Emma Ermawati	(China) Liu Yong (China) Zhang Jiewen	7–8, 6–8, 7–2, 7–2, 7–2	(gold) Winner
2002	Indonesia Open	(Indonesia) Minarti Timur	(Indonesia) Nova Widianto (Indonesia) Vita Marissa	11–7, 11–3	(gold) Winner

=== IBF International ===
Men's singles
Year	Tournament	Opponent	Score	Result
1991	Polish International	(Indonesia) Hariyanto Arbi	15–10, 11–15, 15–13	(gold) Winner
1992	French Open	(China) Wan Zhengwen	15–7, 12–15, 7–15	(silver) Runner-up

Men's doubles
Year	Tournament	Partner	Opponent	Score	Result
2005	Surabaya Satellite	(Indonesia) Tri Kusharjanto	(India) Rupesh Kumar K. T. (India) Sanave Thomas	15–9, 15–12	(gold) Winner
2006	Jakarta Satellite	(Indonesia) Tri Kusharjanto	(Indonesia) Hendra Aprida Gunawan (Indonesia) Joko Riyadi	12–21, 19–21	(silver) Runner-up

Mixed doubles
Year	Tournament	Partner	Opponent	Score	Result
1997	Indonesia International	(Indonesia) Rosalina Riseu	(Indonesia) Wahyu Agung (Indonesia) Rosalia Anastasia	15–11, 15–11	(gold) Winner
2005	Surabaya Satellite	(Indonesia) Minarti Timur	(Indonesia) Tri Kusharjanto (Indonesia) Mona Santoso	Walkover	(gold) Winner
2006	Surabaya Satellite	(Indonesia) Eny Widiowati	(Indonesia) Tri Kusharjanto (Indonesia) Minarti Timur	10–21, 18–21	(silver) Runner-up
