= Rudy Gunawan =

Indonesian badminton player (born 1966)

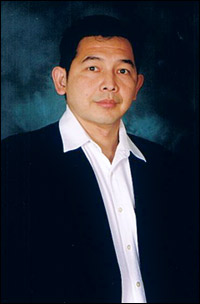

Personal information
- Born: Gunawan; 31 December 1966 (age 59) Surakarta, Central Java, Indonesia
- Height: 6 ft 2 in (1.905 m)

Sport
- Country: Indonesia
- Sport: Badminton
- Handedness: Right
- Coached by: Rudy Hartono; Christian Hadinata

Men's & mixed doubles
- Highest ranking: 1 (1995)
- BWF profile
Medal record
Men's badminton
Representing Indonesia
Olympic Games
Silver medal – second place	1992 Barcelona	Men's doubles
World Championships
Gold medal – first place	1993 Birmingham	Men's doubles
Bronze medal – third place	1989 Jakarta	Men's doubles
World Cup
Gold medal – first place	1990 Bandung–Jakarta	Mixed doubles
Gold medal – first place	1991 Macau	Mixed doubles
Gold medal – first place	1992 Guangzhou	Mixed doubles
Silver medal – second place	1990 Bandung–Jakarta	Men's doubles
Silver medal – second place	1994 Ho Chi Minh	Men's doubles
Bronze medal – third place	1988 Bangkok	Men's doubles
Bronze medal – third place	1989 Guangzhou	Men's doubles
Sudirman Cup
Gold medal – first place	1989 Jakarta	Mixed team
Silver medal – second place	1991 Copenhagen	Mixed team
Silver medal – second place	1993 Birmingham	Mixed team
Silver medal – second place	1995 Lausanne	Mixed team
Thomas Cup
Gold medal – first place	1994 Jakarta	Men's team
Gold medal – first place	1996 Hong Kong	Men's team
Silver medal – second place	1992 Kuala Lumpur	Men's team
Bronze medal – third place	1988 Kuala Lumpur	Men's team
Bronze medal – third place	1990 Tokyo	Men's team
Asian Games
Gold medal – first place	1994 Hiroshima	Men's team
Bronze medal – third place	1990 Beijing	Men's doubles
Bronze medal – third place	1990 Beijing	Mixed doubles
Bronze medal – third place	1990 Beijing	Men's team
Bronze medal – third place	1994 Hiroshima	Mixed doubles
Asian Championships
Silver medal – second place	1987 Semarang	Men's team
Asian Cup
Bronze medal – third place	1995 Qingdao	Men's doubles
SEA Games
Gold medal – first place	1989 Kuala Lumpur	Men's doubles
Gold medal – first place	1991 Manila	Men's doubles
Gold medal – first place	1993 Singapore	Mixed doubles
Gold medal – first place	1993 Singapore	Men's team
Silver medal – second place	1989 Kuala Lumpur	Men's team
Silver medal – second place	1991 Manila	Men's team
Bronze medal – third place	1993 Singapore	Men's doubles

Rudy Gunawan (Chinese: 郭宏源; born 31 December 1966) is a former Indonesian badminton player who played between 1980s and 1990s. Rudy Gunawan won various international championships, both in the men's doubles and mixed doubles events. He has paired up with players such as Eddy Hartono, Rosiana Tendean, Bambang Suprianto, and Ricky Subagja. He was on the Thomas Cup team of Indonesia five times (1988, 1990, 1992, 1994, and 1996) but only won gold in 1994 and 1996. He led the Indonesian team to win the 1989 Sudirman Cup.

Rudy twice competed in the Summer Olympics. In the 1992 Olympics, Rudy and Eddy won a silver medal following the defeat in the final match to South Korean pair Park Joo-bong and Kim Moon-soo. In the 1996 Olympics, Rudy and Bambang pair lost in the round of 16.

== Career ==
Rudy Gunawan was a member of world champion Indonesian Thomas Cup (men's international) teams in 1994 and 1996, winning his final round match on both occasions. He won men's doubles at the 1993 IBF World Championships in Birmingham, England with Ricky Subagja. However, he shared most of his international men's doubles titles with two other fellow countrymen, Eddy Hartono and Bambang Suprianto. These included the prestigious All-England title in 1992 and 1994, the World Badminton Grand Prix in 1990 and 1993, the SEA Games in 1991; as well as the Indonesia (1989, 1992, 1995), Dutch (1989, 1991), Singapore (1990), Thailand (1991, 1993), China (1993), Chinese Taipei (1994), and U.S. (1995) Opens. Gunawan was a silver medalist at the 1992 Olympics in Barcelona with Eddy Hartono. He also shared a number of international mixed doubles titles, including victories at the Indonesia (1990, 1993), Hong Kong (1993), Polish (1993) Opens and World Cup for 3 years running (1990–1991).

== Awards ==
Award	Year	Category	Result	Ref.
Candra Wijaya International Badminton Centre Awards	2013	The best men's doubles legend with Eddy Hartono	Honored	

== Achievements ==
=== Olympic Games ===
Men's doubles
Year	Venue	Partner	Opponent	Score	Result	Ref.
1992	Pavelló de la Mar Bella, Barcelona, Spain	(Indonesia) Eddy Hartono	(South Korea) Kim Moon-soo (South Korea) Park Joo-bong	11–15, 7–15	Silver	

=== World Championships ===
Men's doubles
Year	Venue	Partner	Opponent	Score	Result	Ref.
1989	Senayan Sports Complex, Jakarta, Indonesia	(Indonesia) Eddy Hartono	(China) Chen Hongyong (China) Chen Kang	11–15, 7–15	Bronze	
1993	National Indoor Arena, Birmingham, England	(Indonesia) Ricky Subagja	(Malaysia) Cheah Soon Kit (Malaysia) Soo Beng Kiang	15–11, 15–3	Gold	

=== World Cup ===
Men's doubles
Year	Venue	Partner	Opponent	Score	Result	Ref.
1988	National Stadium, Bangkok, Thailand	(Indonesia) Eddy Hartono	(China) Li Yongbo (China) Tian Bingyi	15–8, 5–15, 11–15	Bronze	
1989	Guangzhou Gymnasium, Guangzhou, China	(Indonesia) Eddy Hartono	(China) Li Yongbo (China) Tian Bingyi	7–15, 4–15	Bronze	
1990	Istora Senayan, Jakarta, Indonesia	(Indonesia) Eddy Hartono	(Malaysia) Jalani Sidek (Malaysia) Razif Sidek	17–14, 8–15, 7–15	Silver	
1994	Phan Đình Phùng Indoor Stadium; Ho Chi Minh, Vietnam	(Indonesia) Bambang Suprianto	(Malaysia) Cheah Soon Kit (Malaysia) Soo Beng Kiang	13–18, 15–2, 16–17	Silver	

Mixed doubles
Year	Venue	Partner	Opponent	Score	Result	Ref.
1990	Istora Senayan, Jakarta, Indonesia	(Indonesia) Rosiana Tendean	(Denmark) Jan Paulsen (England) Gillian Gowers	11–15, 15–9, 15–3	Gold	
1991	Macau Forum, Macau	(Indonesia) Rosiana Tendean	(Denmark) Thomas Lund (Denmark) Pernille Dupont	15–10, 15–9	Gold	
1992	Guangzhou Gymnasium, Guangzhou, China	(Indonesia) Rosiana Tendean	(Denmark) Jan Paulsen (England) Gillian Gowers	17–15, 15–9	Gold	

=== Asian Games ===
Men's doubles
Year	Venue	Partner	Opponent	Score	Result	Ref.
1990	Beijing Gymnasium, Beijing, China	(Indonesia) Eddy Hartono	(South Korea) Kim Moon-soo (South Korea) Park Joo-bong	10–15, 8–15	Bronze	

Mixed doubles
Year	Venue	Partner	Opponent	Score	Result	Ref.
1990	Beijing Gymnasium, Beijing, China	(Indonesia) Rosiana Tendean	(South Korea) Park Joo-bong (South Korea) Chung Myung-hee	9–15, 4–15	Bronze	
1994	Tsuru Memorial Gymnasium, Hiroshima, Japan	(Indonesia) Eliza Nathanael	(South Korea) Yoo Yong-sung (South Korea) Chung So-young	7–15, 6–15	Bronze	

=== Asian Cup ===
Men's doubles
Year	Venue	Partner	Opponent	Score	Result	Ref.
1995	Xinxing Gymnasium, Qingdao, China	(Indonesia) Bambang Suprianto	(Malaysia) Cheah Soon Kit (Malaysia) Yap Kim Hock	6–15, 14–17	Bronze	

=== SEA Games ===
Men's doubles
Year	Venue	Partner	Opponent	Score	Result	Ref.
1989	Stadium Negara, Kuala Lumpur, Malaysia	(Indonesia) Eddy Hartono	(Malaysia) Jalani Sidek (Malaysia) Razif Sidek	15–11, 15–12	Gold	
1991	Camp Crame Gymnasium, Manila, Philippines	(Indonesia) Eddy Hartono	(Malaysia) Jalani Sidek (Malaysia) Razif Sidek	15–11, 15–6	Gold	
1993	Singapore Badminton Hall, Singapore	(Indonesia) Denny Kantono	(Malaysia) Cheah Soon Kit (Malaysia) Soo Beng Kiang	2–15, 15–12, 14–17	Bronze	

Mixed doubles
Year	Venue	Partner	Opponent	Score	Result	Ref.
1993	Singapore Badminton Hall, Singapore	(Indonesia) Eliza Nathanael	(Indonesia) Denny Kantono (Indonesia) Minarti Timur	15–6, 18–15	Gold	

=== IBF World Grand Prix (19 titles, 18 runners-up) ===
The World Badminton Grand Prix, sanctioned by International Badminton Federation (IBF) from 1983 to 2006.

Men's doubles
Year	Tournament	Partner	Opponent	Score	Result	Ref.
1987	Dutch Open	(Indonesia) Bambang Subagio	(Denmark) Mark Christiansen (Sweden) Stefan Karlsson	8–15, 2–15	(silver) Runner-up	
1988	Dutch Open	(Indonesia) Eddy Hartono	(Denmark) Michael Kjeldsen (Denmark) Jens Peter Nierhoff	12–15, 15–7, 4–15	(silver) Runner-up	
1988	World Grand Prix Finals	(Indonesia) Eddy Hartono	(Malaysia) Jalani Sidek (Malaysia) Razif Sidek	15–10, 6–15, 8–15	(silver) Runner-up	
1989	All England Open	(Indonesia) Eddy Hartono	(South Korea) Lee Sang-bok (South Korea) Park Joo-bong	8–15, 7–15	(silver) Runner-up	
1989	Dutch Open	(Indonesia) Eddy Hartono	(Denmark) Jan Paulsen (Denmark) Henrik Svarrer	15–11, 15–2	(gold) Winner	
1989	Indonesia Open	(Indonesia) Eddy Hartono	(Malaysia) Jalani Sidek (Malaysia) Razif Sidek	15–9, 15–7	(gold) Winner	
1990	Singapore Open	(Indonesia) Eddy Hartono	(China) Li Yongbo (China) Tian Bingyi	15–4, 15–8	(gold) Winner	
1990	World Grand Prix Finals	(Indonesia) Eddy Hartono	(Malaysia) Cheah Soon Kit (Malaysia) Soo Beng Kiang	15–6, 15–8	(gold) Winner	
1991	Indonesia Open	(Indonesia) Eddy Hartono	(South Korea) Kim Moon-soo (South Korea) Park Joo-bong	15–18, 13–15	(silver) Runner-up	
1991	Dutch Open	(Indonesia) Eddy Hartono	(Denmark) Jan Paulsen (Denmark) Henrik Svarrer	15–2, 15–11	(gold) Winner	
1991	German Open	(Indonesia) Eddy Hartono	(Denmark) Jon Holst-Christensen (Denmark) Thomas Lund	15–9, 15–11	(gold) Winner	
1991	Thailand Open	(Indonesia) Eddy Hartono	(Malaysia) Cheah Soon Kit (Malaysia) Soo Beng Kiang	15–3, 15–11	(gold) Winner	
1992	All England Open	(Indonesia) Eddy Hartono	(Denmark) Jan Paulsen (Denmark) Henrik Svarrer	15–10, 15–12	(gold) Winner	
1992	Indonesia Open	(Indonesia) Eddy Hartono	(Indonesia) Rexy Mainaky (Indonesia) Ricky Subagja	15–12, 15–5	(gold) Winner	
1992	German Open	(Indonesia) Bambang Suprianto	(Denmark) Jon Holst-Christensen (Denmark) Thomas Lund	6–15, 15–2, 9–15	(silver) Runner-up	
1993	Thailand Open	(Indonesia) Bambang Suprianto	(Indonesia) Imay Hendra (Indonesia) Dicky Purwotjugiono	15–5, 15–7	(gold) Winner	
1993	China Open	(Indonesia) Bambang Suprianto	(China) Chen Hongyong (China) Chen Kang	15–12, 15–12	(gold) Winner	
1993	World Grand Prix Finals	(Indonesia) Bambang Suprianto	(Indonesia) Rexy Mainaky (Indonesia) Ricky Subagja	11–15, 15–10, 15–9	(gold) Winner	
1994	Chinese Taipei Open	(Indonesia) Bambang Suprianto	(Denmark) Jens Eriksen (Denmark) Christian Jakobsen	15–1, 15–8	(gold) Winner	
1994	All England Open	(Indonesia) Bambang Suprianto	(Indonesia) Rexy Mainaky (Indonesia) Ricky Subagja	15–12, 15–12	(gold) Winner	
1994	Indonesia Open	(Indonesia) Bambang Suprianto	(Indonesia) Rexy Mainaky (Indonesia) Ricky Subagja	15–10, 4–15, 15–18	(silver) Runner-up	
1994	Hong Kong Open	(Indonesia) Bambang Suprianto	(Indonesia) Rexy Mainaky (Indonesia) Ricky Subagja	12–15, 17–14, 7–15	(silver) Runner-up	
1994	World Grand Prix Finals	(Indonesia) Bambang Suprianto	(Indonesia) Rexy Mainaky (Indonesia) Ricky Subagja	10–15, 7–15	(silver) Runner-up	
1995	Japan Open	(Indonesia) Bambang Suprianto	(Indonesia) Rexy Mainaky (Indonesia) Ricky Subagja	8–15, 9–15	(silver) Runner-up	
1995	Indonesia Open	(Indonesia) Bambang Suprianto	(Indonesia) Antonius Ariantho (Indonesia) Denny Kantono	15–12, 15–9	(gold) Winner	
1995	U.S. Open	(Indonesia) Bambang Suprianto	(China) Huang Zhanzhong (China) Jiang Xin	15–3, 15–10	(gold) Winner	
1995	Hong Kong Open	(Indonesia) Bambang Suprianto	(South Korea) Ha Tae-kwon (South Korea) Kang Kyung-jin	15–17, 15–12, 3–15	(silver) Runner-up	
1995	World Grand Prix Finals	(Indonesia) Bambang Suprianto	(Malaysia) Cheah Soon Kit (Malaysia) Yap Kim Hock	18–13, 2–15, 12–15	(silver) Runner-up	
1996	Japan Open	(Indonesia) Bambang Suprianto	(Indonesia) Rexy Mainaky (Indonesia) Ricky Subagja	8–15, 15–12, 12–15	(silver) Runner-up	

Mixed doubles
Year	Tournament	Partner	Opponent	Score	Result	Ref.
1988	Denmark Open	(Indonesia) Lilik Sudarwati	(Denmark) Jesper Knudsen (Denmark) Nettie Nielsen	7–15, 4–15	(silver) Runner-up	
1989	Dutch Open	(Indonesia) Rosiana Tendean	(Indonesia) Eddy Hartono (Indonesia) Verawaty Fadjrin	5–15, 5–15	(silver) Runner-up	
1989	German Open	(Indonesia) Rosiana Tendean	(Denmark) Jan Paulsen (England) Gillian Gowers	16–18, 8–15	(silver) Runner-up	
1989	Indonesia Open	(Indonesia) Rosiana Tendean	(Indonesia) Eddy Hartono (Indonesia) Verawaty Fadjrin	7–15, 2–15	(silver) Runner-up	
1990	Indonesia Open	(Indonesia) Rosiana Tendean	(Indonesia) Aryono Miranat (Indonesia) Erma Sulistianingsih	15–5, 11–15, 15–4	(gold) Winner	
1993	French Open	(Indonesia) Rosiana Tendean	(Indonesia) Aryono Miranat (Indonesia) Eliza Nathanael	7–15, 12–15	(silver) Runner-up	
1993	Indonesia Open	(Indonesia) Rosiana Tendean	(Indonesia) Paulus Firman (Indonesia) S. Herawati	15–7, 15–3	(gold) Winner	
1993	Hong Kong Open	(Indonesia) Rosiana Tendean	(Indonesia) Aryono Miranat (Indonesia) Rosalina Riseu	15–12, 15–6	(gold) Winner	

IBF Grand Prix tournament
IBF Grand Prix Finals tournament

=== IBF International (1 title) ===
Mixed doubles
Year	Tournament	Partner	Opponent	Score	Result	Ref.
1993	Polish International	(Indonesia) Rosiana Tendean	(Indonesia) Paulus Firman (Indonesia) S. Herawati	15–8, 15–3	(gold) Winner	

=== Invitational tournament ===
Men's doubles
Year	Tournament	Partner	Opponent	Score	Result	Ref.
1989	Konica Cup	(Indonesia) Eddy Hartono	(Malaysia) Jalani Sidek (Malaysia) Razif Sidek	12–15, 8–15	(silver) Runner-up	

== After badminton ==
Gunawan retired from competitive badminton following the 1996 season, and turned to Christian ministry work in Indonesian villages. In 1999, he went to California for study and received a B.A. degree in theology from Promise Christian University. He is currently serving as a senior pastor in both the Los Angeles and San Francisco areas. Although he has retired from the Indonesian badminton team, he has not retired from the sport. As of 2014, he currently is a coach at the Orange County Badminton Club located in Orange County, California and is also a coach of the USA national badminton team. Not only does the coach, but he is also a professional player, again making a comeback into professional badminton with partner Ryan Chew. As of 2015 he currently ranked 132 in men's doubles.

== Family ==
Gunawan married to Febijane N. Lumingkewas on 11 December 1992 and have 5 children; 4 boys and 1 girl.

His mother, Sally Young (born 1930), was the daughter of Fifi Young an Indonesian actress of mixed French and Chinese and Njoo Cheong Seng a Chinese-Indonesian playwright and film director.
