= Soo Beng Kiang =

Malaysian badminton player (born 1968)

Yang Berbahagia Datuk Soo Beng Kiang PMW SSS KMN BSD
Personal information
- Native name: 苏明强
- Born: 19 March 1968 (age 58)
- Years active: 1986–1996
- Height: 1.76 m (5 ft 9 in)
- Weight: 61 kg (134 lb; 9.6 st)

Sport
- Country: Malaysia
- Sport: Badminton
- Handedness: Left

Men's doubles
- Career title: 11
- Highest ranking: 1 (1992)
- BWF profile
Medal record
Representing Malaysia
Men's badminton
World Championships
Silver medal – second place	1993 Birmingham	Men's doubles
World Cup
Gold medal – first place	1992 Guangzhou	Men's doubles
Gold medal – first place	1994 Ho Chi Minh	Men's doubles
Bronze medal – third place	1990 Jakarta	Men's doubles
Bronze medal – third place	1993 New Delhi	Men's doubles
Thomas Cup
Gold medal – first place	1992 Kuala Lumpur	Team
Silver medal – second place	1988 Kuala Lumpur	Team
Silver medal – second place	1990 Tokyo	Team
Silver medal – second place	1994 Jakarta	Team
Commonwealth Games
Gold medal – first place	1994 Victoria	Men's doubles
Silver medal – second place	1994 Victoria	Mixed team
Asian Games
Silver medal – second place	1990 Beijing	Men's team
Silver medal – second place	1994 Hiroshima	Men's doubles
Bronze medal – third place	1994 Hiroshima	Men's team
Asian Championships
Bronze medal – third place	1989 Shanghai	Men's team
Bronze medal – third place	1991 Kuala Lumpur	Men's doubles
Bronze medal – third place	1993 Hong Kong	Men's team
Asian Cup
Gold medal – first place	1991 Jakarta	Men's doubles
Silver medal – second place	1994 Beijing	Men's doubles
Southeast Asian Games
Gold medal – first place	1989 Kuala Lumpur	Men's team
Gold medal – first place	1991 Manila	Men's team
Gold medal – first place	1993 Singapore	Men's doubles
Silver medal – second place	1993 Singapore	Men's team
Silver medal – second place	1995 Chiang Mai	Men's team
Bronze medal – third place	1989 Kuala Lumpur	Men's doubles
Bronze medal – third place	1989 Kuala Lumpur	Mixed doubles
Bronze medal – third place	1991 Manila	Men's doubles
Bronze medal – third place	1991 Manila	Mixed doubles

Soo Beng Kiang (Chinese: 蘇明強; Jyutping: Sou1 Ming4 Koeng4; Pe̍h-ōe-jī: So͘ Bêng-kiâng, born 19 March 1968) is a former badminton player from Malaysia.

== Career ==
He had played with different pairs such as Cheah Soon Kit (1990–1994) and Tan Kim Her (1995–1996).

Soo competed in badminton at the 1996 Summer Olympics in men's doubles with Tan Kim Her. They defeated the no.3 seeds Rudy Gunawan and Bambang Suprianto of Indonesia in the last 16. In the semi-final, they lost to the eventual gold medalist, Rexy Mainaky and Ricky Subagja of Indonesia. In the bronze medal match, the duo lost hard-fought match also to the Indonesian pair, Antonius Ariantho and Denny Kantono.

== Achievements ==
=== World Championships ===
Men's doubles
Year	Venue	Partner	Opponent	Score	Result
1993	National Indoor Arena, Birmingham, England	(Malaysia) Cheah Soon Kit	(Indonesia) Rudy Gunawan (Indonesia) Ricky Subagja	11–15, 3–15	Silver

=== World Cup ===
Men's doubles
Year	Venue	Partner	Opponent	Score	Result
1990	Istora Senayan, Jakarta, Indonesia	(Malaysia) Cheah Soon Kit	(Indonesia) Eddy Hartono (Indonesia) Rudy Gunawan	13–18, 13–18	Bronze
1992	Guangdong Gymnasium, Guangzhou, China	(Malaysia) Cheah Soon Kit	(Indonesia) Rexy Mainaky (Indonesia) Ricky Subagja	15–10, 15–11	Gold
1993	Indira Gandhi Arena, New Delhi, India	(Malaysia) Cheah Soon Kit	(Indonesia) Rexy Mainaky (Indonesia) Ricky Subagja	9–15, 11–15	Bronze
1994	Phan Đình Phùng Indoor Stadium, Ho Chi Minh City, Vietnam	(Malaysia) Cheah Soon Kit	(Indonesia) Rudy Gunawan (Indonesia) Bambang Suprianto	18–13, 2–15, 17–16	Gold

=== Asian Games ===
Men's doubles
Year	Venue	Partner	Opponent	Score	Result
1994	Tsuru Memorial Gymnasium, Hiroshima, Japan	(Malaysia) Cheah Soon Kit	(Indonesia) Rexy Mainaky (Indonesia) Ricky Subagja	10–15, 2–15	Silver

=== Asian Championships ===
Men's doubles
Year	Venue	Partner	Opponent	Score	Result
1991	Cheras Indoor Stadium, Kuala Lumpur, Malaysia	(Malaysia) Cheah Soon Kit	(South Korea) Park Joo-bong (South Korea) Kim Moon-soo	7–15, 7–15	Bronze

=== Asian Cup ===
Men's doubles
Year	Venue	Partner	Opponent	Score	Result
1991	Istora Senayan, Jakarta, Indonesia	(Malaysia) Cheah Soon Kit	(Indonesia) Ricky Subagja (Indonesia) Rexy Mainaky	17–16, 15–5	Gold
1994	Beijing Gymnasium, Beijing, China	(Malaysia) Cheah Soon Kit	(Indonesia) Ricky Subagja (Indonesia) Rexy Mainaky	8–15, 7–15	Silver

=== Southeast Asian Games ===
Men's doubles
Year	Venue	Partner	Opponent	Score	Result
1989	Stadium Negara, Kuala Lumpur, Malaysia	(Malaysia) Rahman Sidek	(Indonesia) Eddy Hartono (Indonesia) Rudy Gunawan	4–15, 4–15	Bronze
1991	Camp Crame Gymnasium, Manila, Philippines	(Malaysia) Cheah Soon Kit	(Indonesia) Eddy Hartono (Indonesia) Rudy Gunawan	7–15, 3–15	Bronze
1993	Singapore Badminton Hall, Singapore	(Malaysia) Cheah Soon Kit	(Indonesia) Ricky Subagja (Indonesia) Rexy Mainaky	15–7, 11–15, 15–7	Gold

Mixed doubles
Year	Venue	Partner	Opponent	Score	Result
1989	Stadium Negara, Kuala Lumpur, Malaysia	(Malaysia) Lim Siew Choon	(Indonesia) Eddy Hartono (Indonesia) Verawaty Fadjrin	4–15, 4–15	Bronze
1991	Camp Crame Gymnasium, Manila, Philippines	(Malaysia) Tan Lee Wai	(Indonesia) Ricky Subagja (Indonesia) Rosiana Tendean	3–15, 5–15	Bronze

=== Commonwealth Games ===
Men's doubles
Year	Venue	Partner	Opponent	Score	Result
1994	McKinnon Gym, University of Victoria, British Columbia, Canada	(Malaysia) Cheah Soon Kit	(England) Simon Archer (England) Chris Hunt	15–10, 15–9	Gold

=== IBF World Grand Prix ===
The World Badminton Grand Prix sanctioned by International Badminton Federation (IBF) since 1983.

Men's doubles
Year	Tournament	Partner	Opponent	Score	Result
1990	World Grand Prix Finals	(Malaysia) Cheah Soon Kit	(Indonesia) Eddy Hartono (Indonesia) Rudy Gunawan	6–15, 8–15	(silver) Runner-up
1991	Chinese Taipei Open	(Malaysia) Cheah Soon Kit	(Malaysia) Razif Sidek (Malaysia) Jalani Sidek	7–15, 5–15	(silver) Runner-up
1991	Swedish Open	(Malaysia) Cheah Soon Kit	(Denmark) Jon Holst-Christensen (Denmark) Thomas Lund	18–14, 15–7	(gold) Winner
1991	Thailand Open	(Malaysia) Cheah Soon Kit	(Indonesia) Eddy Hartono (Indonesia) Rudy Gunawan	3–15, 11–15	(silver) Runner-up
1992	Chinese Taipei Open	(Malaysia) Cheah Soon Kit	(Malaysia) Tan Kim Her (Malaysia) Jalani Sidek	15–7, 15–4	(gold) Winner
1992	Malaysia Open	(Malaysia) Cheah Soon Kit	(China) Chen Kang (China) Chen Hongyong	15–12, 15–7	(gold) Winner
1992	Canada Open	(Malaysia) Cheah Soon Kit	(South Korea) Ahn Jae-chang (South Korea) Choi Ji-tae	15–4, 15–4	(gold) Winner
1992	US Open	(Malaysia) Cheah Soon Kit	(Denmark) Thomas Lund (Sweden) Jens Olsson	15–9, 15–11	(gold) Winner
1992	World Grand Prix Finals	(Malaysia) Cheah Soon Kit	(Indonesia) Rexy Mainaky (Indonesia) Ricky Subagja	11–15, 6–15	(silver) Runner-up
1993	Chinese Taipei Open	(Malaysia) Cheah Soon Kit	(Indonesia) Bagus Setiadi (Indonesia) Imay Hendra	15–3, 15–12	(gold) Winner
1993	Malaysia Open	(Malaysia) Cheah Soon Kit	(Indonesia) Rexy Mainaky (Indonesia) Ricky Subagja	7–15, 5–15	(silver) Runner-up
1993	Dutch Open	(Malaysia) Cheah Soon Kit	(China) Jiang Xin (China) Yu Qi	15–4, 17–14	(gold) Winner

== Honours ==
- Malaysia:
  - Officer of the Order of the Defender of the Realm (K.M.N.) (1992)
  - Herald of the Order of Loyalty to the Royal Family of Malaysia (B.S.D.) (1988)
- Federal Territory:
  - Commander of the Order of the Territorial Crown (P.M.W.) – Datuk (2026)
- Kedah:
  - Companion of the Order of Loyalty to Sultan Sallehuddin of Kedah (S.S.S.) (2023)
