= Badminton Asian Cup =

Badminton Championships

The Badminton Asian Cup was an Asian continental championship in the five individual disciplines in badminton. It was held in 1991, 1994, 1995 and 1996. From 1997 a team competition called the Asia Cup followed. The Asian Cup Individual championship featured the best players in Asia with the aim of further strengthening and consolidating Asian development in the world badminton. This prestigious invitation event witnessed the best players in Asia to compete for the prize money of US$100,000, one of the richest purses in Asian badminton event.

== Venues ==
Yeat	Edition	City	Country
1991	I	Jakarta	Indonesia
1994	II	Beijing	China
1995	III	Qingdao	China
1996	IV	Seoul	South Korea

== Winners ==
Year	Men's singles	Women's singles	Men's doubles	Women's doubles	Mixed doubles
1991	(Malaysia) Rashid Sidek	(China) Tang Jiuhong	(Malaysia) Cheah Soon Kit (Malaysia) Soo Beng Kiang	(South Korea) Hwang Hye-young (South Korea) Chung So-young	(South Korea) Shon Jin-hwan (South Korea) Gil Young-ah
1994	(China) Dong Jiong	(China) Ye Zhaoying	(Indonesia) Ricky Subagja (Indonesia) Rexy Mainaky	(South Korea) Jang Hye-ock (South Korea) Chung So-young	(China) Liu Jianjun (China) Ge Fei
1995	(Indonesia) Joko Suprianto	(South Korea) Bang Soo-hyun	(China) Huang Zhanzhong (China) Jiang Xin	(China) Ge Fei (China) Gu Jun	(China) Liu Jianjun (China) Sun Man
1996	(Malaysia) Rashid Sidek	(China) Zhang Ning	(South Korea) Yoo Yong-sung (South Korea) Kim Dong-moon	(South Korea) Jang Hye-ock (South Korea) Chung So-young	(South Korea) Park Joo-bong (South Korea) Ra Kyung-min

== Performances by nation ==
	Nation	MS	WS	MD	WD	XD	Total
1	China	1	3	1	1	2	8
2	South Korea		1	1	3	2	7
3	Malaysia	2		1			3
4	Indonesia	1		1			2
