= 1990 All England Open Badminton Championships =

1990 All England Championships
Tournament details
- Dates: 14 March 1990– 17 March 1990
- Edition: 80th
- Venue: Wembley Arena
- Location: London

The 1990 Yonex All England Open Championships was the 80th edition held in 1990, at Wembley Arena, London.

== Final results ==
Category	Winners	Runners-up	Score
Men's singles	(China) Zhao Jianhua	(Indonesia) Joko Suprianto	15–4, 15–1
Women's singles	(Indonesia) Susi Susanti	(China) Huang Hua	12–11, 11–1
Men's doubles	(South Korea) Kim Moon-soo & Park Joo-bong	(China) Li Yongbo & Tian Bingyi	17–14, 15–9
Women's doubles	(South Korea) Chung Myung-hee & Hwang Hye-young	(England) Gillian Clark & Gillian Gowers	6–15, 15–4, 15–4
Mixed doubles	(South Korea) Park Joo-bong & Chung Myung-hee	(Denmark) Jon Holst-Christensen & Grete Mogensen	15–6, 15–3

== Men's singles ==
=== Seeds ===
1. (Denmark) Morten Frost
2. (Indonesia) Joko Suprianto
3. (Denmark) Poul-Erik Høyer Larsen
4. (China) Zhao Jianhua
5. (Indonesia) Alan Budikusuma
6. (Indonesia) Eddy Kurniawan
7. (Sweden) Peter Axelsson
8. (Indonesia) Ardy B. Wiranata

=== Section 1 ===
Round of 32
(China) Zhao Jianhua	15	15
(Denmark) Thomas Kirkegaard	3	6
(Denmark) Thomas Stuer-Lauridsen	17	15
(India) Vimal Kumar	14	5
(Indonesia) Alan Budikusuma	15	15
(Denmark) Torben Carlsen	12	6
(Thailand) Sompol Kukasemkij	15	15
(Denmark) Claus Overbeck	11	3
(Malaysia) Rashid Sidek	15	15
(Denmark) Jens Olsson	9	7
(England) Anders Nielsen	15	15
(Indonesia) Ardy B. Wiranata	10	10
(Denmark) Morten Frost	15	15
(United States) Chris Jogis	5	9
(Finland) Pontus Jäntti	15	15
(Scotland) Alan McMillan	8	2

Round of 16
(China) Jianhua	15	4	15
(Denmark) Stuer-Lauridsen	4	15	5
(Indonesia) Kusuma	15	15
(Thailand) Kukasemkij	9	11
(Malaysia) Sidek	15	15
(England) Nielsen	11	9
(Denmark) Frost	15	15
(Finland) Jäntti	13	8

Quarter-finals
(China) Jianhua	17	15	15
(Indonesia) Kusuma	18	6	9
(Malaysia) Sidek	15	15
(Denmark) Frost	8	6

Semi-finals
(China) Jianhua	18	15
(Malaysia) Sidek	16	6

=== Section 2 ===
Round of 32
(Indonesia) Joko Suprianto	15	15
(Japan) Shuji Matsuno	1	4
(England) Darren Hall	15	15
(Denmark) J Sorensen	12	7
(Malaysia) Foo Kok Keong	7	15	15
(Denmark) Søren Nielsen	15	1	5
(Sweden) Peter Axelsson	10	15	15
(Denmark) Jens Peter Nierhoff	15	11	10
(Indonesia) Eddy Kurniawan	15	4	15
(England) Nick Yates	7	15	8
(Soviet Union) Andrey Antropov	15	15
(Finland) Tony Tuominen	5	9
(Indonesia) Hariyanto Arbi	15	8	15
(Denmark) Poul-Erik Høyer Larsen	2	15	11
(Sweden) Pär-Gunnar Jönsson	17	10	15
(China) Jun Li	16	15	7

Round of 16
(Indonesia) Suprianto	9	15	15
(England) Hall	15	10	6
(Malaysia) Keong	15	10	15
(Sweden) Axelsson	12	15	5
(Indonesia) Kurniawan	15	13	15
(Soviet Union) Antropov	11	15	10
(Indonesia) Arbi	15	15
(Sweden) Jönsson	7	4

Quarter-finals
(Indonesia) Suprianto	15	15
(Malaysia) Keong	1	4
(Indonesia) Kurniawan	15	16	15
(Indonesia) Arbi	5	17	12

Semi-finals
(Indonesia) Suprianto	15	15
(Indonesia) Kurniawan	4	10

== Women's singles ==
=== Section 1 ===
Round of 32
(Indonesia) Susi Susanti	w/o
(Sweden) Catrine Bengtsson	scr
(Japan) Hisako Mizui	11	11
(Denmark) Christina Bostofte	2	4
(Soviet Union) Elena Rybkina	11	11
(England) Fiona Smith	8	5
(South Korea) Hwang Hye-young	11	11
(Netherlands) Erica van den Heuvel	3	3
(China) Zhou Lei	11	11
(England) Felicity Gallup	4	0
(South Korea) Kim Ji-hyun	11	12
(Denmark) Camilla Martin	8	9
(Denmark) Kirsten Larsen	11	11
(Indonesia) Kho Mei Hwa	5	8
(South Korea) Shon Hye-joo	4	11	11
(Netherlands) Astrid van der Knaap	11	5	3

Round of 16
(Indonesia) Susanti	11	11
(Japan) Mizui	5	7
(Soviet Union) Rybkina	12	11
(South Korea) Hye-young	9	10
(China) Zhou Lei	11	11
(South Korea) Ji-hyun	1	6
(Denmark) Larsen	11	11
(South Korea) Hye-joo	5	1

Quarter-finals
(Indonesia) Susanti	11	11
(Soviet Union) Rybkina	8	1
(China) Zhou Lei	11	11
(Denmark) Larsen	7	3

Semi-finals
(Indonesia) Susanti	2	11	11
(China) Zhou Lei	11	5	9

=== Section 2 ===
Round of 32
(China) Huang Hua	2	12	11
(Indonesia) Sarwendah Kusumawardhani	11	10	4
(Netherlands) Monique Hoogland	11	11	11
(Denmark) Helle Andersen	12	3	6
(South Korea) Lee Young-suk	11	11
(Indonesia) Lilak Sudarwati	7	6
(Soviet Union) Vlada Tcherniavskaia	12	12
(England) Helen Troke	10	11
(South Korea) Lee Heung-soon	11	11
(England) Jo Muggeridge	6	5
(Indonesia) Minarti Timur	6	12	11
(Netherlands) Eline Coene	11	10	8
(Denmark) Pernille Nedergaard	11	11
(South Korea) Soon Yun-park	5	4
(South Korea) Jung Eun Kwa	11	11
(Sweden) Margit Borg	1	2

Round of 16
(China) Huang Hua	11	11
(Netherlands) Hoogland	0	2
(South Korea) Young-suk	11	11
(Soviet Union) Tcherniavskaia	7	5
(South Korea) Heung-soon	11	7	11
(Indonesia) Timur	9	11	4
(Denmark) Nedergaard	11	11
(South Korea) Jung Eun Hwa	6	7

Quarter-finals
(China) Huang Hua	10	11	11
(South Korea) Young-suk	12	9	7
(South Korea) Heung-soon	6	11	12
(Denmark) Nedergaard	11	4	10

Semi-finals
(China) Huang Hua	11	11
(South Korea) Heung-soon	0	0
