= 1989 IBF World Championships – Women's singles =

Badminton championships

Men's singles at the 1989 IBF World Championships
- Venue: Istora Senayan
- Location: Jakarta, Indonesia
- Dates: 29 May – 4 June

Medalists
gold medal	Li Lingwei	China
silver medal	Huang Hua	China
bronze medal	Tang Jiuhong	China
bronze medal	Sarwendah Kusumawardhani	Indonesia

The 1989 IBF World Championships were held in Jakarta, Indonesia, in 1989. Following are the results of the women's singles.

== Main stage ==
=== Section 1 ===
First round
(China) Li Lingwei
bye
(New Zealand) Rhona Robertson
bye
(Australia) Lisa Campbell	0	12	11
(Scotland) Elinor Middlemiss	11	11	2
(Malaysia) Lee Wai Leng	11	11
(Finland) Ulrika von Pfaler	0	2
(England) Fiona Smith
bye
(Indonesia) Minarti Timur	11	11
(Thailand) Penpanor Klangthamnium	3	3
(Japan) Harumi Kohara	w	/	o
(Peru) Gloria Jiménez
(United States) Meiling Okuno	6	4
(Germany) Kerstin Ubben	11	11

Second round
(China) Li Lingwei	11	11
(New Zealand) Rhona Robertson	8	4
(Australia) Lisa Campbell	12	12
(Malaysia) Lee Wai Leng	9	10
(England) Fiona Smith	11	7	4
(Indonesia) Minarti Timur	5	11	11
(Japan) Harumi Kohara	11	11
(Germany) Kerstin Ubben	6	0

Third round
(China) Li Lingwei	11	11
(Australia) Lisa Campbell	1	3
(Indonesia) Minarti Timur	11	11
(Japan) Harumi Kohara	5	0

Fourth round
(China) Li Lingwei	11	11
(Indonesia) Minarti Timur	4	6

=== Section 2 ===
First round
(Sweden) Christine Gandrup
bye
(Poland) Bożena Haracz
bye
(Japan) Takako Shinki	11	11
(Sri Lanka) Kaushalya Dissanayake	6	1
(Soviet Union) Tatyana Litvinenko	11	11
(Norway) Marianne Wikdal	1	2
(China) Shi Xiaohui
bye
(Canada) Doris Piché	11	11
(Malaysia) Poh Chin Peng	8	1
(Netherlands) Monique Hoogland	11	11
(South Korea) Kwon Eun-hee	7	6
(Bulgaria) Anetha Stambolizska
(France) Elodie Mansuy	w	/	o

Second round
(Sweden) Christine Gandrup	11	11
(Poland) Bożena Haracz	1	2
(Japan) Takako Shinki	11	11
(Soviet Union) Tatyana Litvinenko	4	8
(China) Shi Xiaohui	11	11
(Canada) Doris Piché	3	8
(Netherlands) Monique Hoogland	11	11
(France) Elodie Mansuy	2	1

Third round
(Sweden) Christine Gandrup	11	11	11
(Japan) Takako Shinki	12	0	7
(China) Shi Xiaohui	11	11
(Netherlands) Monique Hoogland	7	5

Fourth round
(Sweden) Christine Gandrup	11	5	4
(China) Shi Xiaohui	3	11	11

=== Section 3 ===
First round
(South Korea) Lee Young-suk
bye
(Finland) Kristiina Danskanen
bye
(Soviet Union) Elena Rybkina	12	11
(Indonesia) Kho Mei Hwa	11	2
(France) Rosita Rios	3	12	11
(Hong Kong) Chiu Mei Yin	11	10	8
(Denmark) Pernille Nedergaard
bye
(Bulgaria) Diana Filipova	11	11
(Nepal) Kalpana Rana Shrestha	4	4
(New Zealand) Toni Whittaker	11	11
(Malaysia) Lee Yin Ling	6	2
(United States) Erika von Heiland	3	5
(Austria) Sabine Aberer	11	11

Second round
(South Korea) Lee Young-suk
(Finland) Kristiina Danskanen	o.K.
(Soviet Union) Elena Rybkina	11	11
(France) Rosita Rios	0	4
(Denmark) Pernille Nedergaard	11	11
(Bulgaria) Diana Filipova	2	2
(New Zealand) Toni Whittaker	11	11
(Austria) Sabine Aberer	7	1

Third round
(Finland) Kristiina Danskanen	4	3
(Soviet Union) Elena Rybkina	11	11
(Denmark) Pernille Nedergaard	11	11
(New Zealand) Toni Whittaker	2	2

Fourth round
(Soviet Union) Elena Rybkina	11	11
(Denmark) Pernille Nedergaard	6	1

=== Section 4 ===
First round
(China) Tang Jiuhong
bye
(Chinese Taipei) Feng Mei-ying	w	/	o
(Japan) Aiko Miyamura
(New Zealand) Jane Clarke	w	/	o
(Pakistan) Afshan Shakeel
(Thailand) Pornsawan Plungwech	11	12
(Poland) Elżbieta Grzybek	2	9
(Scotland) Jennifer Williamson	w	/	o
(India) Seema Bafna
(Mauritius) Cathy Foo Kune	0	12
(Bulgaria) Emilia Dimitrova	11	11
(Netherlands) Astrid van der Knaap
bye
(Canada) Chantal Jobin	1	1
(Indonesia) Lilik Sudarwati	11	11

Second round
(China) Tang Jiuhong	11	11
(Chinese Taipei) Feng Mei-ying	5	1
(New Zealand) Jane Clarke	0	0
(Thailand) Pornsawan Plungwech	11	11
(Scotland) Jennifer Williamson	11	11
(Bulgaria) Emilia Dimitrova	0	3
(Netherlands) Astrid van der Knaap
(Indonesia) Lilik Sudarwati	w	/	o

Third round
(China) Tang Jiuhong	11	11
(Thailand) Pornsawan Plungwech	4	2
(Scotland) Jennifer Williamson	4	11	1
(Indonesia) Lilik Sudarwati	11	4	11

Fourth round
(China) Tang Jiuhong	6	11	12
(Indonesia) Lilik Sudarwati	11	4	11

=== Section 5 ===
First round
(Japan) Hisako Mori	11	11
(Germany) Nicole Tummer	2	2
(United States) Linda French	11	11
(Norway) Ellen Berg	9	5
(Soviet Union) Vlada Tcherniavskaia	11	11
(Australia) Rhonda Cator	8	6
(Singapore) Fumei Shang
bye
(Malaysia) Lim Siew Choon	11	11
(Nepal) Subha Shrestha	0	0
(Bulgaria) Zornitza Pavlova
(Canada) Johanne Falardeau	w	/	o
bye
(Iceland) Þórdís Edwald
bye
(Indonesia) Susi Susanti

Second round
(Japan) Hisako Mori	11	12
(United States) Linda French	6	11
(Soviet Union) Vlada Tcherniavskaia	7	0
(Singapore) Fumei Shang	11	11
(Malaysia) Lim Siew Choon	w	/	o
(Canada) Johanne Falardeau
(Iceland) Þórdís Edwald	2	2
(Indonesia) Susi Susanti	11	11

Third round
(Japan) Hisako Mori	7	8
(Singapore) Fumei Shang	11	11
(Malaysia) Lim Siew Choon	2	4
(Indonesia) Susi Susanti	11	11

Fourth round
(Singapore) Fumei Shang	0	0
(Indonesia) Susi Susanti	11	11

=== Section 6 ===
First round
(Japan) Kimiko Jinnai	12	11
(India) Madhumita Bisht	11	7
(Mauritius) Martine de Souza	5	2
(New Zealand) Katrin Te Tai	11	11
(Sweden) Catrine Bengtsson	11	11
Marlar Myint	4	8
(South Korea) Bang Soo-hyun
bye
(France) Sandra Dimbour	11	3	11
(Sri Lanka) Sriyani Deepika	8	11	8
(Poland) Bożena Bąk	7	4
(Chinese Taipei) Lee Chien-mei	11	11
bye
(Pakistan) Ghazala Wadood
bye
(China) Huang Hua

Second round
(Japan) Kimiko Jinnai	11	11
(New Zealand) Katrin Te Tai	2	8
(Sweden) Catrine Bengtsson	11	11
(South Korea) Bang Soo-hyun	6	7
(France) Sandra Dimbour	0	2
(Chinese Taipei) Lee Chien-mei	11	11
(Pakistan) Ghazala Wadood
(China) Huang Hua	w	/	o

Third round
(Japan) Kimiko Jinnai	5	11	11
(Sweden) Catrine Bengtsson	11	2	6
(Chinese Taipei) Lee Chien-mei	3	3
(China) Huang Hua	11	11

Fourth round
(Japan) Kimiko Jinnai
(China) Huang Hua	w	/	o

=== Section 7 ===
First round
(Australia) Tracey Small	11	11
(France) Corinne Sonnet	0	4
(Poland) Marzena Masiuk	1	0
(Indonesia) Sarwendah Kusumawardhani	11	11
(Malaysia) Tan Sui Hoon	w	/	o
(India) Deepti Thanekar
(England) Helen Troke
bye
(Germany) Katrin Schmidt	11	11
(Bulgaria) Diana Koleva	7	2
(Austria) Brigitte Langthaler	4	0
(Soviet Union) Irina Serova	11	11
bye
(New Zealand) Lynne Horne
bye
(Denmark) Kirsten Fladberg

Second round
(Australia) Tracey Small	0	2
(Indonesia) Sarwendah Kusumawardhani	11	11
(Malaysia) Tan Sui Hoon	4	9
(England) Helen Troke	11	12
(Germany) Katrin Schmidt	10	11	11
(Soviet Union) Irina Serova	12	3	4
(New Zealand) Lynne Horne	7	8
(Denmark) Kirsten Fladberg	11	11

Third round
(Indonesia) Sarwendah Kusumawardhani	12	11
(England) Helen Troke	9	5
(Germany) Katrin Schmidt	8	4
(Denmark) Kirsten Fladberg	11	11

Fourth round
(Indonesia) Sarwendah Kusumawardhani	11	7	11
(Denmark) Kirsten Fladberg	5	11	3

=== Section 8 ===
First round
(Canada) Denyse Julien	11	11
(Thailand) Somharuthai Jaroensiri	2	8
(Hong Kong) Chan Man Wa	3	9
(Scotland) Anne Gibson	11	12
(Malaysia) Tan Mei Chuan	11	10	11
(Japan) Yoko Koizumi	7	12	7
(Netherlands) Eline Coene
bye
(South Korea) Lee Jung-mi	11	11
(United States) Linda Safarik-Tong	1	2
(Finland) Nina Koho	4	12	0
(New Zealand) Julie Still	11	10	11
bye
(Indonesia) Yuliani Santosa
bye
(China) Han Aiping

Second round
(Canada) Denyse Julien	11	11
(Scotland) Anne Gibson	6	7
(Malaysia) Tan Mei Chuan	5	2
(Netherlands) Eline Coene	11	11
(South Korea) Lee Jung-mi	11	11	12
(New Zealand) Julie Still	4	12	9
(Indonesia) Yuliani Santosa	7	5
(China) Han Aiping	11	11

Third round
(Canada) Denyse Julien	11	5	3
(Netherlands) Eline Coene	8	11	11
(South Korea) Lee Jung-mi	6	6
(China) Han Aiping	11	11

Fourth round
(Netherlands) Eline Coene	11	1	11
(China) Han Aiping	2	11	8

== Final stage ==
Quarterfinals
1	(China) Li Lingwei	10	11	11
8	(Sweden) Christine Gandrup	12	2	6
4	(Soviet Union) Elena Rybkina	2	5
5	(China) Tang Jiuhong	11	11
3	(Indonesia) Susi Susanti	5	6
6	(China) Huang Hua	11	11
2	(Indonesia) Sarwendah Kusumawardhani	11	6	11
7	(Netherlands) Eline Coene	6	11	7

Semifinals
(China) Li Lingwei	6	11	11
(China) Tang Jiuhong	11	8	2
(China) Huang Hua	8	11	11
(Indonesia) Sarwendah Kusumawardhani	11	7	2

Finals
(China) Li Lingwei	11	12
(China) Huang Hua	6	9
