= Badminton at the 1990 Asian Games – Women's singles =

Women's singles at the 1990 Asian Games
- Venue: Beijing Gymnasium
- Dates: 2–6 October
- Competitors: 14 from 7 nations

Medalists
gold medal	Tang Jiuhong	China
silver medal	Lee Young-suk	South Korea
bronze medal	Susi Susanti	Indonesia
bronze medal	Huang Hua	China

The badminton women's singles tournament at the 1990 Asian Games in Beijing took place from 2 October to 6 October.

== Schedule ==
All times are China Standard Time (UTC+08:00)

Date	Time	Event
Tuesday, 2 October 1990	13:00	1st round
Wednesday, 3 October 1990	13:00	Quarterfinals
Friday, 5 October 1990	13:00	Semifinals
Saturday, 6 October 1990	13:00	Final

== Results ==
Legend

- WO — Won by walkover

1st round
Lee Heung-soon (KOR)	11	11
Chui Mei Yin (HKG)	1	1
3/4	Susi Susanti (INA)	11	11
Pornsawan Plungwech (THA)	4	1
Aiko Miyamura (JPN)	11	11
Afshan Shakeel (PAK)	0	0
Somharuthai Jaroensiri (THA)	11	11
Ghazala Wadood (PAK)	1	2
Lee Young-suk (KOR)	11	11
3/4	Hisako Mizui (JPN)	1	2
Sarwendah Kusumawardhani (INA)	11	11
Cheng Yin Sat (HKG)	9	2

Quarterfinals
1	Tang Jiuhong (CHN)	11	11
Lee Heung-soon (KOR)	7	1
3/4	Susi Susanti (INA)	7	11	11
Aiko Miyamura (JPN)	11	3	2
Somharuthai Jaroensiri (THA)	3	8
Lee Young-suk (KOR)	11	11
Sarwendah Kusumawardhani (INA)	11	5	5
2	Huang Hua (CHN)	7	11	11

Semifinals
1	Tang Jiuhong (CHN)	7	11	11
3/4	Susi Susanti (INA)	11	1	7
Lee Young-suk (KOR)	W	O
2	Huang Hua (CHN)

Finals
1	Tang Jiuhong (CHN)	7	11	11
Lee Young-suk (KOR)	11	7	3
