= 1991 IBF World Championships – Women's singles =

Badminton championships

Women's singles at the 1991 IBF World Championships
- Venue: Brøndby Arena
- Location: Copenhagen, Denmark
- Dates: May 2, 1991 – May 8, 1991

Medalists
gold medal	Tang Jiuhong	China
silver medal	Sarwendah Kusumawardhani	Indonesia
bronze medal	Susi Susanti	Indonesia
bronze medal	Lee Heung-soon	South Korea

The 1991 IBF World Championships (World Badminton Championships) were held in Copenhagen, Denmark in 1991. Following the results of the women's singles.

== Qualification ==
(Finland) Sara Ussher - (Austria) Sabine Aberer: 7-11, 11-2, 11-1
(Denmark) Helle Andersen - (Germany) Nicole Baldewein: 12-10, 12-9
(South Korea) Bang Soo-hyun - (Indonesia) Yuliani Santoso: 11-5, 11-5
(Wales) Felicity Gallup - (Mauritius) Martine de Souza: 12-10, 11-6
(Finland) Susanna Kauhanen - (Mexico) Ana Laura de la Torre Saavedra: 11-2, 11-4
(Sweden) Astrid Crabo - (Finland) Annika Nyström: 11-0, 11-2
(Singapore) Zhou Qianmin - (Malaysia) Tan Lee Wai: 11-2, 11-5
(Canada) Marie-Helene Loranger - (Spain) Esther Sanz: 11-8, 11-5

== Main stage ==
=== Section 1 ===
First round
(China) Tang Jiuhong	w.o.
(North Korea) Kim Song Ok
(Nigeria) Dayo Oyewusi	w.o.
(Switzerland) Sarah Haring
(Sweden) Charlotta Wihlborg	11	11
(India) Manjusha Kanwar	7	6
(Republic of Ireland) Ciara Doheny	11	11
(Italy) Erika Henriete Stich	0	0
(South Korea) Bang Soo-hyun	11	11
(Scotland) Anne Gibson	0	4
(Japan) Aiko Miyamura	11	11
(Czechoslovakia) Ludmila Basova	3	2
(Netherlands) Eline Coene	11	11
(Germany) Kerstin Ubben	3	4
(Hong Kong) Cheng Yin Sat	11	11
(Spain) Dolores Marco	0	3

Second round
(China) Tang Jiuhong	w.o.
(Nigeria) Dayo Oyewusi
(Sweden) Charlotta Wihlborg	11	11
(Republic of Ireland) Ciara Doheny	5	3
(South Korea) Bang Soo-hyun	11	11
(Japan) Aiko Miyamura	3	0
(Netherlands) Eline Coene	11	11
(Hong Kong) Cheng Yin Sat	1	6

Third round
(China) Tang Jiuhong	11	11
(Sweden) Charlotta Wihlborg	3	5
(South Korea) Bang Soo-hyun	8	11	11
(Netherlands) Eline Coene	11	8	4

Fourth round
(China) Tang Jiuhong	12	11	11
(South Korea) Bang Soo-hyun	11	12	2

=== Section 2 ===
First round
(Denmark) Pernille Nedergaard Jessen	11	11
(Mexico) Maria de la Paz Luna	1	3
(France) Christelle Mol	11	11
(Norway) Tove Hol	9	1
(Canada) Si-An Deng	w.o.
(Switzerland) Iria Bundgaard
(Poland) Wioletta Sosnowska	11	11
(New Zealand) Sheree Jefferson	4	4
(Malaysia) Liu Yuhong	11	11
(Netherlands) Nicole van Hooren	4	2
(Thailand) Jaroensiri Somharuthai	11	11
(Finland) Ulrica von Pfaler	1	1
(Wales) Felicity Gallup	w.o.
(Soviet Union) Viktoria Pron-Evtousenko
(Malaysia) Tan Sui Hoon	11	11
(United States) Joy Kitzmiller	2	3

Second round
(Denmark) Pernille Nedergaard Jessen	11	11
(France) Christelle Mol	5	3
(Canada) Si-An Deng	12	11
(Poland) Wioletta Sosnowska	10	8
(Malaysia) Liu Yuhong	11	11
(Thailand) Jaroensiri Somharuthai	9	5
(Wales) Felicity Gallup	2	11	11
(Malaysia) Tan Sui Hoon	11	7	5

Third round
(Denmark) Pernille Nedergaard Jessen	6	11	11
(Canada) Si-An Deng	11	7	3
(Malaysia) Liu Yuhong	11	10	11
(Wales) Felicity Gallup	1	12	3

Fourth round
(Denmark) Pernille Nedergaard Jessen
(Malaysia) Liu Yuhong

=== Section 3 ===
First round
(Indonesia) Susi Susanti	11	11
(Japan) Hisako Mizui	7	5
(Iceland) Asa Palsdottir	w.o.
(Grenada) Rachel Bain
(Austria) Irina Serova	11	11
(Denmark) Lisbet Stuer-Lauridsen	7	2
(Poland) Monika Lipinska	11	11
(Malta) Catherine Dimech	4	1
(Sweden) Christine Gandrup	11	11
(United States) Linda French	0	2
(Wales) Joanne Muggeridge	12	11
(Hungary) Andrea Harsagi	10	4
(New Zealand) Rhona Robertson	w.o.
(Mauritius) Cathy Foo Kune
(France) Elodie Mansuy	11	5	11
(Finland) Sara Ussher	7	11	8

Second round
(Indonesia) Susi Susanti	11	11
(Iceland) Asa Palsdottir	2	0
(Austria) Irina Serova	11	11
(Poland) Monika Lipinska	3	6
(Sweden) Christine Gandrup	11	11
(Wales) Joanne Muggeridge	8	5
(New Zealand) Rhona Robertson	11	11
(France) Elodie Mansuy	4	2

Third round
(Indonesia) Susi Susanti	11	11
(Austria) Irina Serova	4	8
(Sweden) Christine Gandrup	12	11
(New Zealand) Rhona Robertson	9	5

Fourth round
(Indonesia) Susi Susanti	11	11
(Sweden) Christine Gandrup	8	1

=== Section 4 ===
First round
(China) Zhou Lei	11	11
(Switzerland) Valentine Ayer	1	1
(Malaysia) Lim Siew Choon	w.o.
(Pakistan) Zarina Jamal
(Australia) Anna Oi Chan Lao	w.o.
(Nigeria) Bridget Ibenero
(Indonesia) Yuni Kartika	11	11
(Bulgaria) Neli Boteva	2	0
(Canada) Denyse Julien	11	11
(United States) Liz Aronsohn	1	8
(Netherlands) Erica van den Heuvel	11	11
(Finland) Christina von Pfaler	4	0
(Chinese Taipei) Chen Hsiao-Li	11	11
(Spain) Cristina González	7	2
(Denmark) Helle Andersen	w.o.
(Soviet Union) Natalja Ivanova

Second round
(China) Zhou Lei	11	11
(Malaysia) Lim Siew Choon	2	2
(Australia) Anna Oi Chan Lao	10	11	11
(Indonesia) Yuni Kartika	12	4	8
(Canada) Denyse Julien	11	11
(Netherlands) Erica van den Heuvel	3	5
(Chinese Taipei) Chen Hsiao-Li	11	11
(Denmark) Helle Andersen	5	8

Third round
(China) Zhou Lei	w.o.
(Australia) Anna Oi Chan Lao
(Canada) Denyse Julien	w.o.
(Chinese Taipei) Chen Hsiao-Li

Fourth round
(China) Zhou Lei	11	11
(Canada) Denyse Julien	6	4

=== Section 5 ===
First round
(Indonesia) Sarwendah Kusumawardhani	11	11
(Italy) Petra Schrott	1	1
(Netherlands) Sonja Mellink	11	9	11
(Czechoslovakia) Jitka Gasparová	7	11	8
(Malaysia) Tan Mei Chuan	11	11
(New Zealand) Tammy Jenkins	7	5
(Austria) Gabriele Kumpfmüller	w.o.
(Pakistan) Afshan Shakeel
(Soviet Union) Elena Rybkina	11	11
(France) Virginie Delvingt	1	8
(Chinese Taipei) Feng Mei-Ying	8	11	11
(Scotland) Gillian Martin	11	1	7
(Sweden) Astrid Crabo	11	11
(Hong Kong) Jenny Chan	6	2
(Japan) Harumi Kohara	11	11
(China) Hu Ning	9	4

Second round
(Indonesia) Sarwendah Kusumawardhani	11	11
(Netherlands) Sonja Mellink	2	6
(Malaysia) Tan Mei Chuan	11	12
(Austria) Gabriele Kumpfmüller	4	10
(Soviet Union) Elena Rybkina	11	11
(Chinese Taipei) Feng Mei-Ying	5	0
(Sweden) Astrid Crabo	11	12
(Japan) Harumi Kohara	3	10

Third round
(Indonesia) Sarwendah Kusumawardhani	11	11
(Malaysia) Tan Mei Chuan	2	5
(Soviet Union) Elena Rybkina	11	11
(Sweden) Astrid Crabo	5	1

Fourth round
(Indonesia) Sarwendah Kusumawardhani	11	11
(Soviet Union) Elena Rybkina	8	8

=== Section 6 ===
First round
(England) Helen Troke	11	11
(India) Madhumita Bisht	4	7
(Germany) Andrea Findhammer	11	10	11
(Scotland) Sonya McGinn	4	12	7
(Australia) Lisa Campbell	11	11
(Mauritius) Vandanah Seesurun	0	0
(Norway) Camilla Wright	w.o.
(Nigeria) Bisi Tiamiyu
(Malaysia) Lee Wai Leng	11	11
(Finland) Susanna Kauhanen	2	2
(Poland) Bozena Bak	'w.o.
(Netherlands) Monique Hoogland
(Denmark) Camilla Martin	11	11
(Canada) Heather Poole	3	1
(Hong Kong) Wong Chun Fan	11	11
(Switzerland) Silvia Albrecht	6	2

Second round
(England) Helen Troke	11	11
(Germany) Andrea Findhammer	2	1
(Australia) Lisa Campbell	11	11
(Norway) Camilla Wright	1	0
(Malaysia) Lee Wai Leng	11	11
(Poland) Bozena Bak	2	1
(Denmark) Camilla Martin	11	11
(Hong Kong) Wong Chun Fan	3	9

Third round
(England) Helen Troke	11	11
(Australia) Lisa Campbell	4	8
(Malaysia) Lee Wai Leng	5	11	12
(Denmark) Camilla Martin	11	3	9

Fourth round
(England) Helen Troke	11	3	11
(Malaysia) Lee Wai Leng	5	11	7

=== Section 7 ===
First round
(South Korea) Lee Heung-soon	11	11
(Thailand) Pornsawan Plungwech	6	3
(Switzerland) Maiken Mork	w.o.
(Mexico) Gabriela Melgoza
(Netherlands) Astrid van der Knaap	11	3	12
(Japan) Kazue Kanai	5	11	9
(New Zealand) Julie Still	7	11	11
(United States) Erika von Heiland	11	3	6
(Indonesia) Lilik Sudarwati	11	11
(Norway) Gry Kirsti Skjonhaug	2	2
(Canada) Doris Piché	12	11
(Australia) Rhonda Cator	11	7
(Singapore) Zhou Qianmin	w.o.
(Nigeria) Obiageli Olorunsola
(Soviet Union) Vlada Tcherniavskaia	11	11
(France) Sandra Dimbour	6	1

Second round
(South Korea) Lee Heung-soon	11	11
(Switzerland) Maiken Mork	2	5
(Netherlands) Astrid van der Knaap	11	11
(New Zealand) Julie Still	6	9
(Indonesia) Lilik Sudarwati	10	11	11
(Canada) Doris Piché	12	2	4
(Singapore) Zhou Qianmin	11	11
(Soviet Union) Vlada Tcherniavskaia	6	8

Third round
(South Korea) Lee Heung-soon	11	12
(Netherlands) Astrid van der Knaap	1	9
(Indonesia) Lilik Sudarwati	11	12
(Singapore) Zhou Qianmin	2	10

Fourth round
(South Korea) Lee Heung-soon	11	11
(Indonesia) Lilik Sudarwati	3	0

=== Section 8 ===
First round
(China) Huang Hua	11	11
(Germany) Katrin Schmidt	3	6
(Chinese Taipei) Shyu Yu-Ling	11	11
(Austria) Brigitte Langthaler	7	0
(England) Julie Bradbury	11	11
(Iceland) Elsa Nielsen	8	2
(Switzerland) Bettina Gfeller	'w.o.
(Pakistan) Ghazala Wadood
(Japan) Haruko Yachi	11	11
(Malta) Shirley Cefai	0	0
(Sweden) Catrine Bengtsson	w.o.
(Poland) Beata Syta
(Finland) Nina Koho	11	12
(North Korea) Kim Myong Sun	5	9
(Canada) Marie-Helene Loranger	8	11	11
(Cyprus) Diana Knekna	11	1	3

Second round
(China) Huang Hua	11	11
(Chinese Taipei) Shyu Yu-Ling	1	6
(England) Julie Bradbury	11	11
(Switzerland) Bettina Gfeller	1	2
(Japan) Haruko Yachi	w.o.
(Sweden) Catrine Bengtsson
(Finland) Nina Koho	11	11
(Canada) Marie-Helene Loranger	5	4

Third round
(China) Huang Hua	11	11
(England) Julie Bradbury	3	7
(Japan) Haruko Yachi	11	11
(Finland) Nina Koho	4	7

Fourth round
(China) Huang Hua	11	11
(Japan) Haruko Yachi	0	1

== Final stage ==
Quarterfinals
(China) Tang Jiuhong	11	11
(Denmark) Pernille Nedergaard Jessen	7	1
(Indonesia) Susi Susanti	11	11
(China) Zhou Lei	5	6
(Indonesia) Sarwendah Kusumawardhani	11	11
(England) Helen Troke	0	3
(South Korea) Lee Heung-soon	2	11	11
(China) Huang Hua	11	4	6

Semifinals
(China) Tang Jiuhong	11	11
(Indonesia) Susi Susanti	4	1
(Indonesia) Sarwendah Kusumawardhani	2	11	11
(South Korea) Lee Heung-soon	11	7	6

Finals
(China) Tang Jiuhong	11	11
(Indonesia) Sarwendah Kusumawardhani	6	1
