= 1991 All England Open Badminton Championships =

1991 All England Championships
Tournament details
- Dates: 13 March 1991– 17 March 1991
- Edition: 81st
- Venue: Wembley Arena
- Location: London

The 1991 Yonex All England Open was the 81st edition of the All England Open Badminton Championships. It was held from March 13 to March 17, 1991, in London, England.

It was a five-star tournament and the prize money was US$125,000.

== Venue ==
- Wembley Arena

== Final results ==
Category	Winners	Runners-up	Score
Men's singles	(Indonesia) Ardy Wiranata	(Malaysia) Foo Kok Keong	15–12, 15–10
Women's singles	(Indonesia) Susi Susanti	(Indonesia) Sarwendah Kusumawardhani	0–11, 11–2, 11–6
Men's doubles	(China) Li Yongbo & Tian Bingyi	(South Korea) Kim Moon-soo & Park Joo-bong	12–15, 15–7, 15–8
Women's doubles	(South Korea) Chung So-young & Hwang Hye-young	(Japan) Kimiko Jinnai & Hisako Mori	15–5, 15–3
Mixed doubles	(South Korea) Park Joo-bong & Chung Myung-hee	(Denmark) Thomas Lund & Pernille Dupont	15–10, 10–15, 15–4

== Men's singles ==
=== Section 1 ===
Round of 32
(China) Zhao Jianhua	17	15
(Indonesia) Joko Suprianto	14	8
(South Korea) Kim Hak-kyun	15	15
(Denmark) Søren Nielsen	11	5
(Denmark) Morten Frost	15	15
(Soviet Union) Andrey Antropov	8	9
(Indonesia) Alan Budikusuma	15	15
(England) Matthew A Smith	4	4
(Malaysia) Foo Kok Keong	12	17	15
(Indonesia) Hermawan Susanto	15	15	9
(Denmark) Jens Peter Nierhoff	12	15	15
(China) Rong Chen	15	11	4
(England) Darren Hall	9	15	15
(Indonesia) Fung Permadi	15	12	10
(Denmark) Claus Thomsen	15	15
(Netherlands) Jeroen van Dijk	5	11

Round of 16
(China) Jianhua	17	7	15
(South Korea) Hak-kyun	16	15	9
(Denmark) Frost	15	15
(Indonesia) Kusuma	9	8
(Malaysia) Foo	12	15	15
(Denmark) Nierhoff	15	12	2
(England) Hall	15	15
(Denmark) Thomsen	8	5

Quarter-finals
(China) Jianhua	9	17	15
(Indonesia) Kusuma	15	15	0
(Malaysia) Foo	15	15
(England) Hall	8	10

Semi-finals
(China) Jianhua	11	7
(Malaysia) Foo	15	15

=== Section 2 ===
Round of 32
(Japan) Hiroki Eto	18	15
(Scotland) Kevin Scott	13	12
(Denmark) Poul-Erik Høyer Larsen	15	15
(England) Peter Bush	5	9
(Indonesia) Eddy Kurniawan	15	15
(England) Steve Butler	6	4
(China) Wu Wenkai	15	15
(South Korea) Lee Gwang-jin	8	8
(South Korea) Ahn Jae-chang	15	15
(Denmark) Torben Carlsen	2	5
(Denmark) Thomas Stuer-Lauridsen	15	8	15
(Malaysia) Rashid Sidek	8	15	4
(Denmark) Peter Espersen	9	15	15
(Denmark) Claus Overbeck	15	12	7
(Indonesia) Ardy Wiranata	15	15
(Denmark) Kent Waede Hansen	3	5

Round of 16
(Scotland) Scott	6	8
(Denmark) Høyer Larsen	15	15
(England) Butler	7	5
(China) Wenkai	15	15
(Denmark) Stuer-Lauridsen	17	16	15
(Indonesia) Jae-chang	16	18	12
(Denmark) Espersen	15	15
(Indonesia) Wiranata	3	5

Quarter-finals
(Denmark) Høyer Larsen	15	15	15
(China) Wenkai	17	4	6
(Denmark) Stuer-Lauridsen	11	3
(Indonesia) Wiranata	15	15

Semi-finals
(China) Wenkai	15	16	5
(Indonesia) Wiranata	8	17	15

== Women's singles ==
=== Section 1 ===
Round of 32
(Indonesia) Susi Susanti	11	11
(Thailand) Pornsawan Plungwech	7	1
(Canada) Denyse Julien	11	11
(New Zealand) Rhonda Robertson	2	3
(China) Hu Ning	11	9	11
(England) Helen Troke	7	12	2
(South Korea) Gil Young-Ah	9	11	11
(Sweden) Christine Magnusson	12	9	8
(China) Huang Hua	11	11
(England) Julia Mann	0	2
(Japan) Harumi Kohara	11	3	12
(England) Julie Bradbury	2	11	9
(Denmark) Pernille Nedergaard	7	11	11
(Germany) Katrina Schmidt	11	5	3
(South Korea) Shim Eun-Jung	11	10	11
(Netherlands) Eline Coene	7	12	3

Round of 16
(Indonesia) Susanti	11	11
(Canada) Julien	7	4
(China) Hu Ning	12	12
(South Korea) Young-Ah	10	10
(China) Huang Hua	11	11
(Japan) Kohhara	8	1
(Denmark) Nedergaard	11	6	5
(South Korea) Eun-Jung	3	11	11

Quarter-finals
(Indonesia) Susanti	11	11
(China) Hu Ning	5	0
(China) Huang Hua	11	11
(South Korea) Eun-Jung	5	1

Semi-finals
(Indonesia) Susanti	11	12
(China) Huang Hua	4	10

=== Section 2 ===
Round of 32
(Indonesia) Sarwendah Kusumawardhani	11	11
(Mexico) Maria De La Paz Luna	3	3
(Thailand) Somharuthai Jaroensiri	11	12
(Soviet Union) Natalja Ivanova	8	10
(Canada) Doris Piche	11	11
(Netherlands) Astrid van der Knaap	9	6
(China) Zhou Lei	11	11
(Sweden) Jeanette Kuhl	2	1
(Soviet Union) Elena Rybkina	12	11
(Netherlands) Erica van den Heuvel	9	8
(Denmark) Camilla Martin	11	11
(Scotland) Gillian Martin	6	3
(South Korea) Bang Soo-Hyun	6	11	11
(England) Joanne Muggeridge	11	3	6
(China) Tang Jiuhong	11	11
(Denmark) Lisbet Stuer-Lauridsen	2	5

Round of 16
(Indonesia) Kusumawardhani	11	11
(Thailand) Jaroensiri	3	7
(Canada) Piche	5	11	1
(China) Zhou Lei	11	7	11
(Soviet Union) Rybkina	11	4	4
(Denmark) Martin	7	11	11
(South Korea) Soo-Hyun	12	7	2
(China) Tang Jiuhong	10	11	11

Quarter-finals
(Indonesia) Kusumawardhani	11	11
(China) Zhou Lei	1	4
(Denmark) Martin	4	1
(China) Tang Jiuhong	11	11

Semi-finals
(Indonesia) Kusumawadhani	11	10	11
(China) Tang Jiuhong	5	12	8
