= Badminton at the 1990 Asian Games – Women's team =

Women's team at the 1990 Asian Games
- Venue: Beijing Gymnasium
- Dates: 28–30 September
- Competitors: 36 from 5 nations

Medalists
gold medal	China; Guan Weizhen, Huang Hua, Lai Caiqin, Nong Qunhua, Shi Fangjing, Tang Jiuhong, Yao Fen, Zhou Lei
silver medal	Indonesia; Verawaty Fadjrin, Sarwendah Kusumawardhani, Lilik Sudarwati, Erma Sulistianingsih, Susi Susanti, Lili Tampi, Rosiana Tendean, Minarti Timur
bronze medal	Japan; Kimiko Jinnai, Kazue Kanai, Tomomi Matsuo, Aiko Miyamura, Hisako Mizui, Hisako Mori, Kyoko Sasage
bronze medal	South Korea; Chung Myung-hee, Chung So-young, Gil Young-ah, Hwang Hye-young, Lee Heung-soon, Lee Jung-mi, Lee Young-suk, Shim Eun-jung

The badminton women's team tournament at the 1990 Asian Games in Beijing Sports Complex, Beijing took place from 28 September to 30 September.

== Schedule ==
All times are China Standard Time (UTC+08:00)

Date	Time	Event
Friday, 28 September 1990	13:00	Quarterfinals
Saturday, 29 September 1990	13:00	Semifinals
Sunday, 30 September 1990	13:00	Final

== Results ==
Quarterfinals			Semifinals			Final
			1	China	5
			3/4	Japan	0
						1	China	4
	Thailand	0				3/4	Indonesia	1
3/4	Indonesia	5	3/4	Indonesia	3
			2	South Korea	2

=== Quarterfinals ===
28 September	Thailand	0–5	Indonesia

=== Semifinals ===
29 September	China	5–0	Japan

Tang Jiuhong	2–0	Aiko Miyamura	11–5, 11–2
Huang Hua	2–0	Kazue Kanai	11–3, 11–2
Yao Fen / Lai Caiqin	2–1	Kimiko Jinnai / Hisako Mori	15–11, 11–15, 15–9
Guan Weizhen / Nong Qunhua	2–1	Kyoko Sasage / Tomomi Matsuo	15–11, 15–10
Zhou Lei	2–0	Hisako Mizui	11–3, 11–0

29 September	Indonesia	3–2	South Korea

Susi Susanti	2–1	Lee Young-suk	5–11, 11–8, 11–8
Minarti Timur	2–0	Lee Heung-soon	11–7, 11–2
Rosiana Tendean / Erma Sulistianingsih	0–2	Hwang Hye-young / Chung So-young	5–15, 4–15
Verawaty Fadjrin / Lili Tampi	1–2	Gil Young-ah / Shim Eun-jung	9–15, 15–8, 7–15
Sarwendah Kusumawardhani	2–0	Lee Jung-mi	11–5, 11–2

=== Final ===
30 September	China	4–1	Indonesia

Tang Jiuhong	2–0	Susi Susanti	12–10, 11–6
Huang Hua	2–0	Minarti Timur	12–11, 11–4
Yao Fen / Lai Caiqin	1–2	Rosiana Tendean / Erma Sulistianingsih	15–9, 11–15, 10–15
Guan Weizhen / Nong Qunhua	2–1	Verawaty Fadjrin / Lili Tampi	12–15, 15–7, 18–13
Zhou Lei	2–0	Sarwendah Kusumawardhani	11–3, 11–1
