= 1991 Indonesia Open (badminton) =

The 1991 Indonesia Open in badminton was held in Bandung, from July 10 to July 14, 1991. It was a five-star tournament and the prize money was US$135,000.

== Final results ==
Category	Winners	Runners-up	Score
Men's singles	(Indonesia) Ardy Wiranata	(Indonesia) Joko Suprianto	15–7, 15–5
Women's singles	(Indonesia) Susi Susanti	(South Korea) Lee Heung-soon	11–8, 11–3
Men's doubles	(South Korea) Park Joo-bong & Kim Moon-soo	(Indonesia) Eddy Hartono & Rudy Gunawan	18–15, 15–13
Women's doubles	(South Korea) Chung Myung-hee & Hwang Hye-young	(South Korea) Chung So-young & Gil Young-ah	14–18, 15–10, 15–9
Mixed doubles	(Denmark) Thomas Lund & Pernille Dupont	(Indonesia) Aryono Miranat & Eliza	15–11, 15–9
