= Lee Heung-soon =

South Korean badminton player

Personal information
- Born: 19 November 1971 (age 54)
- Height: 1.67 m (5 ft 6 in)

Sport
- Country: South Korea
- Sport: Badminton
- Handedness: Right
- Event: Women's singles

Women's singles
- BWF profile
Medal record
Women's badminton
Representing South Korea
World Championships
Bronze medal – third place	1991 Copenhagen	Women's singles
World Cup
Bronze medal – third place	1991 Macau	Women's singles
Bronze medal – third place	1992 Guangzhou	Women's singles
Sudirman Cup
Gold medal – first place	1991 Copenhagen	Mixed team
Gold medal – first place	1993 Birmingham	Mixed team
Uber Cup
Silver medal – second place	1988 Kuala Lumpur	Women's team
Silver medal – second place	1990 Tokyo	Women's team
Silver medal – second place	1992 Kuala Lumpur	Women's team
Asian Games
Bronze medal – third place	1990 Beijing	Women's team
Gold medal – first place	1994 Hiroshima	Women's team
Asian Championships
Bronze medal – third place	1991 Kuala Lumpur	Women's singles

Lee Heung-soon (born 19 November 1971) is a retired female badminton player from South Korea.

== Career ==
Lee competed in badminton at the 1992 Summer Olympics in women's singles. She lost in quarterfinals to Huang Hua, of China, 11–3, 10–12, 11–0.

== Achievements ==
=== World Championships ===
Women's singles

Year	Venue	Opponent	Score	Result
1991	Brøndby Arena, Copenhagen, Denmark	(Indonesia) Sarwendah Kusumawardhani	11–2, 7–11, 6–11	Bronze

=== World Cup ===
Women's singles

Year	Venue	Opponent	Score	Result
1991	Macau Forum, Portuguese Macau	(Indonesia) Sarwendah Kusumawardhani	1–11, 11–7, 7–11	Bronze
1992	Guangdong Gymnasium, Guangzhou, China	(China) Tang Jiuhong	1–11, 5–11	Bronze

=== Asian Championships ===
Women's singles

Year	Venue	Opponent	Score	Result
1991	Cheras Stadium; Kuala Lumpur, Malaysia	(South Korea) Shim Eun-jung	4–11, 12–11, 3–11	Bronze

=== World Junior Championships ===
The Bimantara World Junior Championships was an international invitation badminton tournament for junior players. It was held in Jakarta, Indonesia from 1987 to 1991.

Girls' doubles

Year	Venue	Partner	Opponent	Score	Result
1987	Jakarta, Indonesia	(South Korea) Kang Bok-seung	(South Korea) Lee Jung-mi (South Korea) Gil Young-ah	15–18, 18–16, 6–15	Bronze

=== IBF World Grand Prix ===
The World Badminton Grand Prix sanctioned by International Badminton Federation (IBF) from 1983 to 2006.

Women's singles

Year	Tournament	Opponent	Score	Result
1991	Indonesian Open	(Indonesia) Susi Susanti	8–11, 3–11	(silver) Runner-up
1991	Thailand Open	(Indonesia) Susi Susanti	7–11, 4–11	(silver) Runner-up
1993	Swedish Open	(South Korea) Bang Soo-hyun	2–11, 6–11	(silver) Runner-up

=== Invitational Tournament ===
Women's doubles

Year	Tournament	Venue	Partner	Opponent	Score	Result
1988	Asian Invitational Championships	Bandar Lampung, Indonesia	(South Korea) Lee Young-suk	(Indonesia) Verawaty Fadjrin (Indonesia) Yanti Kusmiati	7–15, 2–15	Bronze
