= Southeast Asian Badminton Championships =

Badminton championships

The Southeast Asian Badminton Championships are a series of badminton tournaments organized by the Badminton Asia governing body and formerly the ASEAN Schools Sports Council to crown the best senior and junior badminton players in Southeast Asia.

== History ==
In June 1953, the Badminton Association of Malaya announced that the association would be organizing a badminton tournament for Southeast Asian countries, namely Indonesia, Malaya, the Philippines, Singapore and Thailand with India, Hong Kong and Japan as invitees. The tournament was scheduled to be held in April 1957 but was never finalized. In 1966, the Republic of Vietnam Badminton Federation organized the first Southeast Asian badminton team tournament in Saigon with the Philippines winning the men's team division and Cambodia winning the women's team division.

== Championships (U–23) ==
| Year | Edition | Host city | Host country | Events |
|---|---|---|---|---|
| 1958 | ~~1~~ | ~~Kuala Lumpur~~ | ~~Malaya~~ | 7 |
| 1966 | 1 | Saigon (1) | South Vietnam (1) | 2 |
| 1985 | 2 | Bandar Seri Begawan (1) | Brunei (1) | 1 |
| 1987 | ~~3~~ | ~~Singapore~~ | ~~Singapore~~ | 7 |
| 2025 | 3 | Phnom Penh (1) | Cambodia (1) | 6 |
| 2026 | 4 | Phnom Penh (2) | Cambodia (2) | 6 |

=== Previous winners ===
==== Individual competition ====
| Year | Men's singles | Women's singles | Men's doubles | Women's doubles | Mixed doubles |
|---|---|---|---|---|---|
| 1966 | Not held | | | | |
| 1985 | Not held | | | | |
| 2025 | (Myanmar) Hein Htut | (Laos) Phoutsavanh Daopasith | (Myanmar) Hein Htut (Myanmar) Phyo Thurain Kyaw | (Cambodia) Heang Leakhena (Cambodia) Loeung Malynich | (Cambodia) Sok Rikreay (Cambodia) Heang Leakhena |
| 2026 | (Laos) Xayyalath Souksavat | (Myanmar) Lin Lin Htet | (Myanmar) Phyo Thurain Kyaw (Myanmar) Lal Zuidika | (Myanmar) Su Latt (Myanmar) Eaint Chit Phoo | (Cambodia) Yam Samnang (Cambodia) Loeung Malynich |

==== Team competition (1966–2005) ====
| Year | Men | Women |
|---|---|---|
| 1966 | Philippines | Cambodia |
| 1985 | Indonesia | Not held |

==== Team competition (2025–) ====
| Year | Mixed |
|---|---|
| 2025 | Myanmar |
| 2026 | Myanmar |

== Junior championships (U–19, U–18) ==
=== Location of the Southeast Asian Junior Championships (U–19, U–18) ===
The table below gives an overview of all host cities and countries of the Southeast Asian Junior Championships, also known as the ASEAN Schools Badminton Championships.

| Year | Edition | Host city | Host country | Events |
|---|---|---|---|---|
| 1978 | 1 | Singapore (1) | Singapore (1) | 7 |
| 1979 | 2 | Jakarta (1) | Indonesia (1) | 2 |
| 1980 | 3 | Kuala Lumpur (1) | Malaysia (1) | 6 |
| 1984 | 4 | Kuala Lumpur (2) | Malaysia (2) | 7 |
| 1986 | 5 | Singapore (2) | Singapore (2) | 7 |
| 1990 | 6 | Jakarta (2) | Indonesia (2) | 7 |
| 1991 | 7 | Bandar Seri Begawan (1) | Brunei (1) | 7 |
| 1994 | 8 | Malacca City (1) | Malaysia (3) | 2 |
| 1997 | 9 | Hanoi (1) | Vietnam (1) | 7 |
| 1999 | 10 | Bandar Seri Begawan (2) | Brunei (2) | 7 |
| 2002 | 11 | Singapore (3) | Singapore (3) | 7 |
| 2004 | 12 | Medan (1) | Indonesia (3) | 7 |
| 2005 | 13 | Bandar Seri Begawan (3) | Brunei (3) | 7 |
| 2008 | 14 | Manila (1) | Philippines (1) | 7 |
| 2026 | 15 | Phnom Penh (1) | Cambodia (1) | 6 |

=== Previous winners ===
==== Individual competition ====
| Year | Men's singles | Women's singles | Men's doubles | Women's doubles | Mixed doubles |
|---|---|---|---|---|---|
| 1978 | (Indonesia) Bobby Ertanto | (Indonesia) Ivana Lie | (Malaysia) Jalani Sidek (Malaysia) Misbun Sidek | (Indonesia) Ivana Lie (Indonesia) Susi Ogeh | (Indonesia) Sigit Pamungkas (Indonesia) Yanti Kusmiati |
| 1979 | (Indonesia) Icuk Sugiarto | (Indonesia) Novianti Mawardi | (Indonesia) Sigit Pamungkas (Indonesia) Icuk Sugiarto | (Indonesia) Yanti Kusmiati (Indonesia) Novianti Mawardi | (Indonesia) Sigit Pamungkas (Indonesia) Yanti Kusmiati |
| 1980 | (Indonesia) Icuk Sugiarto | (Indonesia) Novianti Mawardi | (Indonesia) Sigit Pamungkas (Indonesia) Icuk Sugiarto | (Indonesia) Yanti Kusmiati (Indonesia) Novianti Mawardi | Not held |
| 1984 | (Indonesia) Yut Wahyudi | (Indonesia) Tri Rahayu | (Malaysia) Lee Kong Yong (Malaysia) Tee Seng Keong | (Thailand) Sasithorn Maneeratanaporn (Thailand) Ladawan Mulasartsatorn | (Indonesia) Yut Wahyudi (Indonesia) Sarwendah Kusumawardhani |
| 1986 | (Indonesia) Rexy Mainaky | (Thailand) Ladawan Mulasartsatorn | (Indonesia) Rexy Mainaky (Indonesia) Budi Nugroho | (Indonesia) Eny Oktaviani (Indonesia) Lili Tampi | (Thailand) Narin Roongbannaphan (Thailand) Piyathip Sansaniyakulvilai |
| 1990 | No data | | | | |
| 1991 | No data | | | | |
| 1994 | No data | | | | |
| 1997 | No data | | | | |
| 1999 | No data | | | | |
| 2002 | No data | | | | |
| 2004 | No data | | | | |
| 2005 | No data | | | | |
| 2008 | (Malaysia) Iskandar Zulkarnain Zainuddin | (Malaysia) Tee Jing Yi | (Thailand) Sarayuth Saetung (Thailand) Sermsin Wongyaporm | (Indonesia) Della Destiara Haris (Indonesia) Claudia Ayu Wijaya | (Thailand) Bodin Isara (Thailand) Nuttaya Sanlekanan |
| 2026 | (Myanmar) Hein Thiha Aung | (Myanmar) Seng Hlaing Main | (Myanmar) Hein Thiha Aung (Myanmar) Nyan Shaine Lin | (Myanmar) Lin Lin Htet (Myanmar) Seng Hlaing Main | (Myanmar) Hein Thiha Aung (Myanmar) Seng Hlaing Main |

==== Team competition ====
| Year | Men | Women |
|---|---|---|
| 1978 | Indonesia | Indonesia |
| 1979 | Indonesia | Indonesia |
| 1980 | Indonesia | Indonesia |
| 1984 | Malaysia | Indonesia |
| 1986 | Indonesia | Indonesia |
| 1990 | Indonesia | Indonesia |
| 1991 | Indonesia | Indonesia |
| 1994 | Indonesia | Indonesia |
| 1997 | Indonesia | Indonesia |
| 1999 | Indonesia | Malaysia |
| 2002 | Indonesia | Indonesia |
| 2004 | Indonesia | Indonesia |
| 2005 | Indonesia | Indonesia |
| 2008 | Thailand | Indonesia |

==== Team competition (2026–) ====
| Year | Mixed |
|---|---|
| 2026 | Myanmar |

== Youth Championships (U–17, U–16 & U–15) ==
=== Location of the Southeast Asian Youth Championships (U–17 & U–15) ===
The table below gives an overview of all host cities and countries of the Southeast Asian U–17 and U–15 Junior Championships.

| Year | Edition | Host city | Host country | Events |
|---|---|---|---|---|
| 2005 | 1 | Hanoi (1) | Vietnam (1) | 1 |
| 2023 | 2 | Phnom Penh (1) | Cambodia (1) | 12 |
| 2024 | 3 | Vientiane (1) | Laos (1) | 12 |
| 2025 | 4 | Phnom Penh (2) | Cambodia (2) | 12 |
| 2026 | 5 | Phnom Penh (3) | Cambodia (3) | 12 |

=== Previous winners ===
==== Individual competition U–17 ====
| Year | Men's singles | Women's singles | Men's doubles | Women's doubles | Mixed doubles |
|---|---|---|---|---|---|
| 2005 | Not held | | | | |
| 2023 | (Myanmar) Nyan Shaine Lin | (Myanmar) Eaint Chit Phoo | (Myanmar) Nyan Shaine Lin (Myanmar) Phone Htet Zaw | (Cambodia) Loeung Malynich (Cambodia) Sok Somalyta | (Myanmar) Phone Htet Zaw (Myanmar) Eaint Chit Phoo |
| 2024 | (Myanmar) Nyan Shaine Lin | (Myanmar) Lin Lin Htet | (Myanmar) Hein Thiha Aung (Myanmar) Nyan Shaine Lin | (Myanmar) Lin Lin Htet (Myanmar) Seng Hlaing Main | (Myanmar) Hein Thiha Aung (Myanmar) Seng Hlaing Main |
| 2025 | (Cambodia) Mork Lisiminh | (Myanmar) Lin Lin Htet | (Cambodia) Outhit Kantikorn (Cambodia) Som Socheatamony | (Cambodia) Kuy Kanika (Cambodia) Loeung Malyneth | (Myanmar) Oak Soe Khant (Myanmar) Seng Hlaing Main |

=== Previous winners ===
==== Individual competition U–16 ====
| Year | Men's singles | Women's singles | Men's doubles | Women's doubles | Mixed doubles |
|---|---|---|---|---|---|
| 2005 | Not held | | | | |
| 2026 | (Myanmar) Min Myat Moe | (Cambodia) Yen Chevqech | (Myanmar) Min Myat Moe (Myanmar) Kaung Myat Chan Thar | (Cambodia) Yen Chevqech (Cambodia) Leng Seavmey | (Myanmar) Min Myat Moe (Myanmar) Thoon Nadi Phyo |

==== Individual competition U–15 ====
| Year | Men's singles | Women's singles | Men's doubles | Women's doubles | Mixed doubles |
|---|---|---|---|---|---|
| 2005 | Not held | | | | |
| 2023 | (Myanmar) Nyi Zaya | (Myanmar) Lin Lin Htet | (Myanmar) Ye Lin Htet (Myanmar) Nyi Zaya | (Myanmar) Lin Lin Htet (Myanmar) Thadar Htet Kyaw | (Myanmar) Nyi Zaya (Myanmar) Lin Lin Htet |
| 2024 | (Myanmar) Oak Soe Khant | (Myanmar) Yoon Thet Htar Maung | (Myanmar) Oak Soe Khant (Myanmar) Myint Myat Lin | (Myanmar) Thadar Htet Kyaw (Myanmar) Yoon Thet Htar Maung | (Myanmar) Oak Soe Khant (Myanmar) Thadar Htet Kyaw |
| 2025 | (Myanmar) Min Myat Moe | (Myanmar) Thoon Nadi Phyo | (Myanmar) Kaung Myat Hein (Myanmar) Min Myat Moe | (Cambodia) Mak Nitajulie (Cambodia) Thet Sreyroth | (Myanmar) Min Myat Moe (Myanmar) Thoon Nadi Phyo |

==== Team competition U–17 ====
| Year | Mixed |
|---|---|
| 2023 | Myanmar |
| 2024 | Myanmar |
| 2025 | Myanmar |

==== Team competition U–16 ====
| Year | Men | Women |
|---|---|---|
| 2005 | Vietnam | Not held |

==== Team competition U–15 ====
| Year | Mixed |
|---|---|
| 2023 | Myanmar |
| 2024 | Myanmar |
| 2025 | Myanmar |

== See also ==
- Badminton Asia Championships
