= 1992 Badminton World Cup =

Badminton championships

Tournament details
- Dates: 19–23 August 1992
- Edition: 14th
- Total prize money: US$150,000
- Venue: Guangdong Gymnasium
- Location: Guangzhou, China

The 1992 Badminton World Cup was the fourteenth edition of an international tournament Badminton World Cup. The event was held in Guangzhou, China in from 19 August to 23 August 1992. Indonesia won the men's singles and mixed doubles events while China won both the women's events. Malaysia secured a title in men's doubles discipline.

== Medalists ==
Event	Gold	Silver	Bronze
Men's singles	(Indonesia) Joko Suprianto	(Indonesia) Hermawan Susanto	(Malaysia) Foo Kok Keong
Men's singles	(Indonesia) Joko Suprianto	(Indonesia) Hermawan Susanto	(China) Zhao Jianhua
Women's singles	(China) Tang Jiuhong	(China) Huang Hua	(South Korea) Lee Heung-soon
Women's singles	(China) Tang Jiuhong	(China) Huang Hua	(South Korea) Bang Soo-hyun
Men's doubles	(Malaysia) Soo Beng Kiang (Malaysia) Cheah Soon Kit	(Indonesia) Rexy Mainaky (Indonesia) Ricky Subagja	(Malaysia) Yap Yee Hup (Malaysia) Yap Yee Guan
Men's doubles	(Malaysia) Soo Beng Kiang (Malaysia) Cheah Soon Kit	(Indonesia) Rexy Mainaky (Indonesia) Ricky Subagja	(China) Chen Kang (China) Chen Hongyong
Women's doubles	(China) Yao Fen (China) Lin Yanfen	(England) Gillian Gowers (England) Sara Sankey	(England) Gillian Clark (Sweden) Christine Magnusson
Women's doubles	(China) Yao Fen (China) Lin Yanfen	(England) Gillian Gowers (England) Sara Sankey	(Indonesia) Rosiana Tendean (Indonesia) Erma Sulistianingsih
Mixed doubles	(Indonesia) Rudy Gunawan (Indonesia) Rosiana Tendean	(Denmark) Jan Paulsen (England) Gillian Gowers	(China) Chen Xingdong (China) Sun Man
Mixed doubles	(Indonesia) Rudy Gunawan (Indonesia) Rosiana Tendean	(Denmark) Jan Paulsen (England) Gillian Gowers	(Sweden) Pär-Gunnar Jonsson (Sweden) Maria Bengtsson

== Men's singles ==
=== Finals ===
Semi-finals
(Indonesia) Joko Suprianto	15	15
(Malaysia) Foo Kok Keong	12	2
(China) Zhao Jianhua	15	4	2
(Indonesia) Hermawan Susanto	13	15	15

Final
(Indonesia) Joko Suprianto	18	15
(Indonesia) Hermawan Susanto	13	8

== Women's singles ==
=== Finals ===
Semi-finals
(China) Tang Jiuhong	11	11
(South Korea) Lee Heung-soon	1	5
(South Korea) Bang Soo-hyun	12	9	9
(China) Huang Hua	10	11	11

Final
(China) Tang Jiuhong	11	11
(China) Huang Hua	8	5

== Men's doubles ==
=== Finals ===
Semi-finals
(Indonesia) Rexy Mainaky (Indonesia) Ricky Subagja	15	15
(China) Chen Hongyong (China) Chen Kang	11	11
(Malaysia) Yap Yee Guan (Malaysia) Yap Yee Hup	3	14
(Malaysia) Cheah Soon Kit (Malaysia) Soo Beng Kiang	15	17

Final
(Indonesia) Rexy Mainaky (Indonesia) Ricky Subagja	10	11
(Malaysia) Cheah Soon Kit (Malaysia) Soo Beng Kiang	15	15

== Women's doubles ==
=== Finals ===
Semi-finals
(China) Lin Yanfen (China) Yao Fen
(England) Gillian Clark (Sweden) Christine Magnusson
(Indonesia) Erma Sulistianingsih (Indonesia) Rosiana Tendean	15	15
(England) Gillian Gowers (England) Sara Sankey	18	18

Final
(China) Lin Yanfen (China) Yao Fen	15	15
(England) Gillian Gowers (England) Sara Sankey	0	3

== Mixed doubles ==
=== Finals ===
Semi-finals
(Indonesia) Rudy Gunawan (Indonesia) Rosiana Tendean	11	18	17
(China) Sun Man (China) Chen Xingdong	15	15	15
(Denmark) Jan Paulsen (England) Gillian Gowers	12	18	17
(Sweden) Pär-Gunnar Jonsson (Sweden) Maria Bengtsson	15	14	14

Final
(Indonesia) Rudy Gunawan (Indonesia) Rosiana Tendean	17	15
(Denmark) Jan Paulsen (England) Gillian Gowers	15	9
