= 1989 Badminton World Cup =

Badminton championships

Tournament details
- Dates: 15–19 November 1989
- Edition: 11th
- Total prize money: US$135,000
- Venue: Canton Gymnasium
- Location: Guangzhou, China

The 1989 Badminton World Cup was the eleventh edition of an international tournament Badminton World Cup. The event was held in from 15 to 19 November 1989. China won the men's singles & women's doubles categories while South Korea secured titles in men's doubles & mixed doubles discipline. Indonesia's Susi won women's singles title.

== Medalists ==
Event	Gold	Silver	Bronze
Men's singles	(China) Yang Yang	(Malaysia) Foo Kok Keong	(China) Zhao Jianhua
Men's singles	(China) Yang Yang	(Malaysia) Foo Kok Keong	(Denmark) Poul-Erik Høyer Larsen
Women's singles	(Indonesia) Susi Susanti	(China) Han Aiping	(China) Tang Jiuhong
Women's singles	(Indonesia) Susi Susanti	(China) Han Aiping	(China) Huang Hua
Men's doubles	(South Korea) Kim Moon-soo (South Korea) Park Joo-bong	(China) Li Yongbo (China) Tian Bingyi	(Indonesia) Eddy Hartono (Indonesia) Rudy Gunawan
Men's doubles	(South Korea) Kim Moon-soo (South Korea) Park Joo-bong	(China) Li Yongbo (China) Tian Bingyi	(Japan) Shinji Matsuura (Japan) Shuji Matsuno
Women's doubles	(China) Guan Weizhen (China) Lin Ying	(South Korea) Chung So-young (South Korea) Hwang Hye-young	(China) Sun Xiaoqing (China) Zhou Lei
Women's doubles	(China) Guan Weizhen (China) Lin Ying	(South Korea) Chung So-young (South Korea) Hwang Hye-young	(Indonesia) Verawaty Fajrin (Indonesia) Yanti Kusmiati
Mixed doubles	(South Korea) Park Joo-bong (South Korea) Chung Myung-hee	(South Korea) Kim Moon-soo (South Korea) Chung So-young	(Sweden) Jan-Eric Antonsson (Sweden) Maria Bengtsson
Mixed doubles	(South Korea) Park Joo-bong (South Korea) Chung Myung-hee	(South Korea) Kim Moon-soo (South Korea) Chung So-young	(China) Jiang Guoliang (China) Nong Qunhua

== Men's singles ==
=== Finals ===
Semi-finals
(China) Yang Yang	15	7	18
(China) Zhao Jianhua	9	15	13
(Denmark) Poul-Erik Høyer Larsen	7	17
(Malaysia) Foo Kok Keong	15	18

Final
(China) Yang Yang	17	15
(Malaysia) Foo Kok Keong	14	6

== Women's singles ==
=== Finals ===
Semi-finals
(China) Han Aiping	10	11	11
(China) Huang Hua	12	8	4
(Indonesia) Susi Susanti	11	10	12
(China) Tang Jiuhong	4	12	11

Final
(China) Han Aiping	5	4
(Indonesia) Susi Susanti	11	11

== Men's doubles ==
=== Finals ===
Semi-finals
(Indonesia) Eddy Hartono (Indonesia) Rudy Gunawan	7	4
(China) Li Yongbo (China) Tian Bingyi	15	15
(Japan) Shinji Matsuura (Japan) Shuji Matsuno	1	9
(South Korea) Kim Moon-soo (South Korea) Park Joo-bong	15	15

Final
(China) Li Yongbo (China) Tian Bingyi	10	11
(South Korea) Kim Moon-soo (South Korea) Park Joo-bong	15	15

== Women's doubles ==
=== Finals ===
Semi-finals
(China) Guan Weizhen (China) Lin Ying	15	15
(China) Sun Xiaoqing (China) Zhou Lei	7	4
(Indonesia) Verawaty Fajrin (Indonesia) Yanti Kusmiati	11	6
(South Korea) Chung So-young (South Korea) Hwang Hye-young	15	15

Final
(China) Guan Weizhen (China) Lin Ying	15	17
(South Korea) Chung So-young (South Korea) Hwang Hye-young	2	15

== Mixed doubles ==
=== Finals ===
Semi-finals
(South Korea) Park Joo-bong (South Korea) Chung Myung-hee	15	15
(Sweden) Jan-Eric Antonsson (Sweden) Maria Bengtsson	2	8
(China) Jiang Guoliang (China) Nong Qunhua	7	12
(South Korea) Kim Moon-soo (South Korea) Chung So-young	15	15

Final
(South Korea) Park Joo-bong (South Korea) Chung Myung-hee	15	15
(South Korea) Kim Moon-soo (South Korea) Chung So-young	5	9
