= Susi Susanti =

Indonesian badminton player

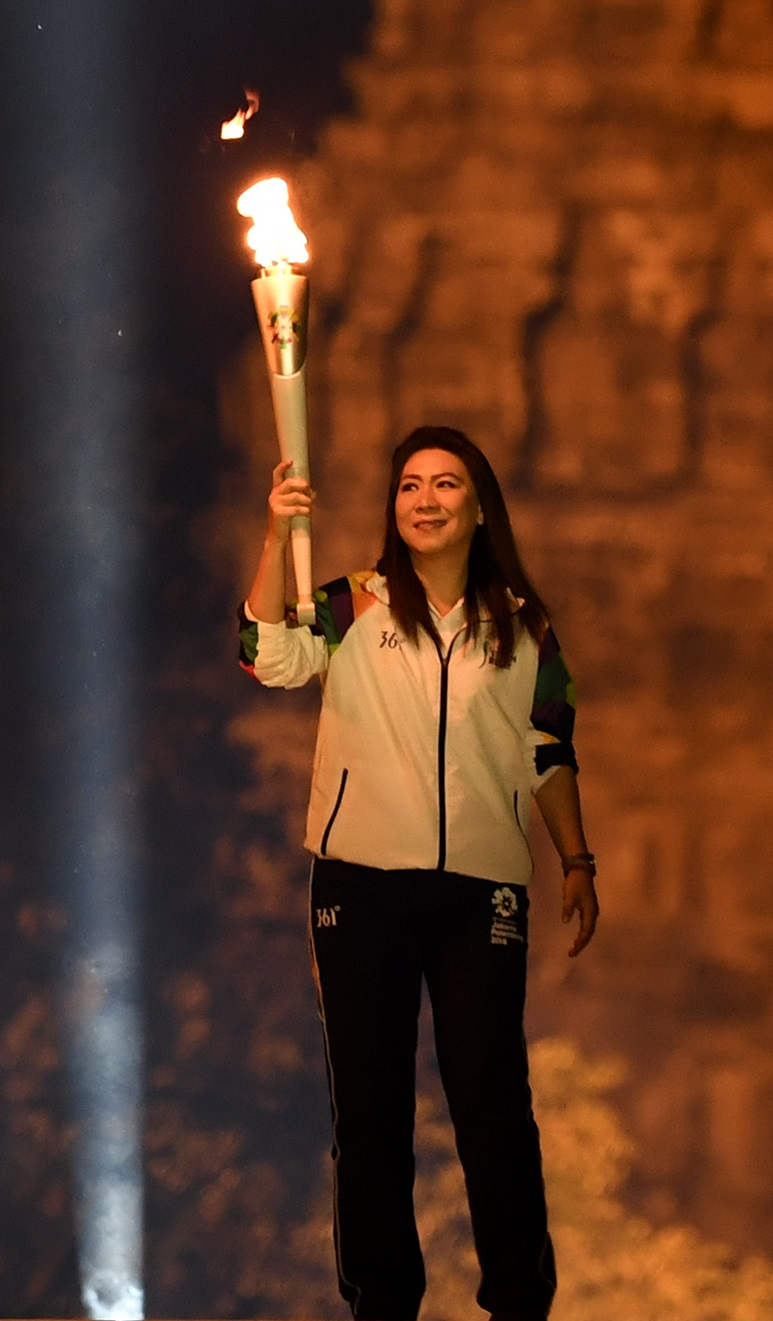
- Susanti carrying a torch fire during the 2018 Asian Games Torch Relay Concert in Jakarta, Indonesia

Personal information
- Full name: Lucia Francisca Susanti Haditono
- Born: Ong Lien Hiang 王蓮香; 11 February 1971 (age 55) Tasikmalaya, West Java, Indonesia
- Height: 1.65 m (5 ft 5 in)
- Spouse: Alan Budikusuma (m. 1997)

Sport
- Country: Indonesia
- Sport: Badminton
- Handedness: Right
- Coached by: Liang Qiuxia
- Retired: 1998

Women's singles
- Highest ranking: 1
- BWF profile
Medal record
Women's badminton
Representing Indonesia
Olympic Games
Gold medal – first place	1992 Barcelona	Women's singles
Bronze medal – third place	1996 Atlanta	Women's singles
World Championships
Gold medal – first place	1993 Birmingham	Women's singles
Bronze medal – third place	1991 Copenhagen	Women's singles
Bronze medal – third place	1995 Lausanne	Women's singles
World Cup
Gold medal – first place	1989 Guangzhou	Women's singles
Gold medal – first place	1993 New Delhi	Women's singles
Gold medal – first place	1994 Ho Chi Minh	Women's singles
Gold medal – first place	1996 Jakarta	Women's singles
Gold medal – first place	1997 Yogyakarta	Women's singles
Silver medal – second place	1990 Bandung-Jakarta	Women's singles
Silver medal – second place	1995 Jakarta	Women's singles
Bronze medal – third place	1991 Macau	Women's singles
Sudirman Cup
Gold medal – first place	1989 Jakarta	Mixed team
Silver medal – second place	1991 Copenhagen	Mixed team
Silver medal – second place	1993 Birmingham	Mixed team
Silver medal – second place	1995 Lausanne	Mixed team
Bronze medal – third place	1997 Glasgow	Mixed team
Uber Cup
Gold medal – first place	1994 Jakarta	Women's team
Gold medal – first place	1996 Hong Kong	Women's team
Silver medal – second place	1998 Hong Kong	Women's team
Bronze medal – third place	1990 Nagoya-Tokyo	Women's team
Bronze medal – third place	1992 Kuala Lumpur	Women's team
Asian Games
Silver medal – second place	1990 Beijing	Women's team
Silver medal – second place	1994 Hiroshima	Women's team
Bronze medal – third place	1990 Beijing	Women's singles
Bronze medal – third place	1994 Hiroshima	Women's singles
SEA Games
Gold medal – first place	1987 Jakarta	Women's team
Gold medal – first place	1989 Kuala Lumpur	Women's singles
Gold medal – first place	1989 Kuala Lumpur	Women's team
Gold medal – first place	1991 Manila	Women's singles
Gold medal – first place	1991 Manila	Women's team
Gold medal – first place	1995 Chiang Mai	Women's singles
Gold medal – first place	1995 Chiang Mai	Women's team
Gold medal – first place	1997 Jakarta	Women's team
Silver medal – second place	1987 Jakarta	Women's singles

Lucia Francisca "Susi" Susanti Haditono (Chinese: 王蓮香; pinyin: Wáng Liánxiāng; Pe̍h-ōe-jī: Ông Liân-hiang; born 11 February 1971) is an Indonesian retired badminton player. Relatively small of stature, she combined quick and graceful movement with elegant shotmaking technique, and is regarded by many as one of the greatest women's singles players of all time. She was the inaugural Olympic women's badminton champion and the first Indonesian Olympic gold medalist.

== Career ==
Susanti won the women's singles gold medal at the 1992 Olympic Games in Barcelona, Spain and the bronze medal at the 1996 Olympic Games in Atlanta, United States. She retired from the world badminton circuit not long after her marriage, in February 1997, to Alan Budikusuma, who had also won a badminton singles gold medal at the 1992 Summer Olympics. Susanti was the most dominant women's singles player in the first half of the 1990s, winning the All England Open in 1990, 1991, 1993 and 1994, the World Badminton Grand Prix Finals five consecutive times from 1990 to 1994 as well as in 1996, and the IBF World Championships in 1993. She is the only female player to hold the Olympic, World Championship, and All-England singles titles simultaneously. She won the Japan Open three times and the Indonesian Open six times. She also won numerous Badminton Grand Prix series events and five Badminton World Cups. She led the Indonesian team to victory over perennial champion China in the 1994 and 1996 Uber Cup (women's world team) competitions. All of this came during a relatively strong period in women's international badminton. Her chief competitors early in her prime years were the Chinese players Tang Jiuhong and Huang Hua, and, later, China's Ye Zhaoying and the Korean Bang Soo-hyun.

Susanti was inducted into the International Badminton Federation (IBF, currently BWF) Hall of Fame in May 2004, and received the Herbert Scheele Trophy in 2002. She lit the flame at the 2018 Asian Games opening ceremony.

== Playing style ==
Susanti was an extremely durable defensive player who liked to instigate long rallies to wear down her opponent's stamina and invite errors. That style was in contrast to most of the top female players of her time such as Bang Soo-hyun, Tang Jiuhong, Huang Hua, and Ye Zhaoying, who employed a more aggressive style.

Susanti's matches against top-tier opponents were characteristically slow-paced and long, especially in the era of 15 points system when a player could only earn a point when she or he held the serve. Susanti relied on deep clears to the back line, limiting the chance of a fast-paced exchange, mixed with tight drop shots, forcing her opponent to cover the entire court. Susanti frequently covered her backhand side with overhead forehands, by relying on her quickness and back-arching suppleness. Relatively short, she often stretched her legs very wide to take low shots at the corners or away from her position. Developed from training, this leg-stretching, almost balletic maneuver became a signature pose which sometimes ended with a full leg split. In the later years of her career, Susanti incorporated more smashing into her repertoire, enough to throw off opponents expecting only a game of attrition.

== Personal life ==
She is married to Alan Budikusuma (Chinese: 魏仁芳), a men's badminton Olympic gold medalist (also in 1992) and one of the top men's players in the history of the sport, a former Chinese Indonesian badminton player who excelled at the world level from the late 1980s to the mid-1990s. Together they have three children, Laurencia Averina, born 1999, Albertus Edward, born 2000, Sebastianus Fredrick, born 2003. When the eldest daughter was born, Indonesia was rocked by a series of civil outbreaks and violence. Susanti decided to name her daughter Laurencia Averina Wiratama, which means “peace”, hoping that she would bring about peace in the nation.

== In popular culture ==
A biopic in Indonesian based on Susanti's life story, entitled Susi Susanti: Love All directed by Sim F with Laura Basuki playing the titular role and Dion Wiyoko as Alan Budikusuma was released on 24 October 2019.

== Awards and nominations ==
Award	Year	Category	Result	Ref.
Government of Indonesia Awards	1992	Tanda Kehormatan Bintang Jasa Utama	Placed	
International Badminton Federation Awards	2002	Herbert Scheele Trophy	Inducted	
International Badminton Federation Awards	2004	Badminton Hall of Fame	Inducted	
RCTI Indonesian Sports Entertainment Awards	2024	Most Popular Legendary Athlete	Nominated	
CNN Indonesia Awards, West Java	2024	Most Influential Figures in the Development of Indonesian Badminton	Won	

== Achievements ==
=== Olympic Games ===
Women's singles
Year	Venue	Opponent	Score	Result
1992	Pavelló de la Mar Bella; Barcelona, Spain	(South Korea) Bang Soo-hyun	5–11, 11–5, 11–3	Gold
1996	GSU Sports Arena; Atlanta, United States	(South Korea) Kim Ji-hyun	11–4, 11–1	Bronze

=== World Championships ===
Women's singles
Year	Venue	Opponent	Score	Result
1991	Brøndby Arena; Copenhagen, Denmark	(China) Tang Jiuhong	4–11, 1–11	Bronze
1993	National Indoor Arena; Birmingham, England	(South Korea) Bang Soo-hyun	7–11, 11–9, 11–3	Gold
1995	Malley Sports Centre; Lausanne, Switzerland	(China) Ye Zhaoying	11–5, 8–11, 2–11	Bronze

=== World Cup ===
Women's singles
Year	Venue	Opponent	Score	Result
1989	Guangzhou Gymnasium; Guangzhou, China	(China) Han Aiping	11–5, 11–4	Gold
1990	Istora Senayan; Jakarta, Indonesia	(Indonesia) Sarwendah Kusumawardhani	5–11, 11–1, 11–12	Silver
1991	Macau Forum, Macau	(China) Huang Hua	3–11, 2–11	Bronze
1993	Indira Gandhi Arena; New Delhi, India	(Sweden) Lim Xiaoqing	11–7, 11–5	Gold
1994	Phan Đình Phùng Indoor Stadium; Ho Chi Minh City, Vietnam	(South Korea) Bang Soo-hyun	12–9, 11–6	Gold
1995	Istora Senayan, Jakarta, Indonesia	(China) Ye Zhaoying	9–12, 11–2, 9–12	Silver
1996	Istora Senayan, Jakarta, Indonesia	(China) Wang Chen	11–7, 11–4	Gold
1997	Among Rogo Sports Hall; Yogyakarta, Indonesia	(China) Ye Zhaoying	11–8, 11–5	Gold

=== Asian Games ===
Women's singles
Year	Venue	Opponent	Score	Result
1990	Beijing Gymnasium; Beijing, China	(China) Tang Jiuhong	11–7, 1–11, 7–11	Bronze
1994	Tsuru Memorial Gymnasium; Hiroshima, Japan	(Japan) Hisako Mizui	4–11, 5–11	Bronze

=== SEA Games ===
Women's singles
Year	Venue	Opponent	Score	Result
1987	Kuningan Hall; Jakarta, Indonesia	(Indonesia) Elizabeth Latief	5–11, 9–11	Silver
1989	Stadium Negara; Kuala Lumpur, Malaysia	(Indonesia) Sarwendah Kusumawardhani	11–7, 11–6	Gold
1991	Camp Crame Gymnasium; Manila, Philippines	(Indonesia) Sarwendah Kusumawardhani	5–11, 11–8, 11–2	Gold
1995	Gymnasium 3, 700th Anniversary Sport Complex; Chiang Mai, Thailand	(Thailand) Somharuthai Jaroensiri	11–4, 11–0	Gold

=== World Junior Championships ===
The Bimantara World Junior Championships was an international invitation badminton tournament for junior players. It was held in Jakarta, Indonesia from 1987 to 1991.

Girls' singles
Year	Venue	Opponent	Score	Result
1987	Jakarta, Indonesia	(South Korea) Lee Jung-mi	11–6, 8–11, 11–6	Gold
1988	Jakarta, Indonesia	(China) Huang Ying	11–5, 11–2	Gold

Girls' doubles
Year	Venue	Partner	Opponent	Score	Result
1987	Jakarta, Indonesia	(Indonesia) Lilik Sudarwati	(South Korea) Gil Young-ah (South Korea) Lee Jung-mi	9–15, 15–6, 15–5	Gold
1988	Jakarta, Indonesia	(Indonesia) Lilik Sudarwati	(South Korea) Bang Soo-hyun (South Korea) Shon Hye-joo	14–18, 18–14, 15–4	Gold

Mixed doubles
Year	Venue	Partner	Opponent	Score	Result
1987	Jakarta, Indonesia	(Indonesia) Ardy Wiranata	(Indonesia) Ricky Subagja (Indonesia) Lilik Sudarwati	7–15, 15–7, 15–9	Gold

=== IBF World Grand Prix (39 titles, 13 runners-up) ===
The World Badminton Grand Prix was sanctioned by the International Badminton Federation from 1983 to 2006.

Women's singles
Year	Tournament	Opponent	Score	Result
1989	All England Open	(China) Li Lingwei	8–11, 4–11	(silver) Runner-up
1989	Chinese Taipei Open	(Sweden) Christine Gandrup	11–8, 3–11, 7–11	(silver) Runner-up
1989	Indonesia Open	(China) Huang Hua	11–7, 11–0	(gold) Winner
1990	All England Open	(China) Huang Hua	12–11, 11–1	(gold) Winner
1990	Indonesia Open	(South Korea) Lee Young-suk	11–1, 8–11, 4–11	(silver) Runner-up
1990	Australian Open	(Australia) Anna Lao	11–1, 11–4	(gold) Winner
1990	World Grand Prix Finals	(China) Tang Jiuhong	8–11, 11–5, 12–10	(gold) Winner
1991	Chinese Taipei Open	(Thailand) Somharuthai Jaroensiri	11–1, 11–2	(gold) Winner
1991	Japan Open	(China) Huang Hua	3–11, 6–11	(silver) Runner-up
1991	All England Open	(Indonesia) Sarwendah Kusumawardhani	0–11, 11–2, 11–6	(gold) Winner
1991	Indonesia Open	(South Korea) Lee Heung-soon	11–8, 11–3	(gold) Winner
1991	Denmark Open	(China) Huang Hua	11–5, 6–11, 11–8	(gold) Winner
1991	Thailand Open	(South Korea) Lee Heung-soon	11–7, 11–4	(gold) Winner
1991	Swedish Open	(Denmark) Pernille Nedergaard	11–2, 11–3	(gold) Winner
1991	World Grand Prix Finals	(South Korea) Lee Heung-soon	9–11, 11–8, 11–1	(gold) Winner
1992	Denmark Open	(Sweden) Lim Xiaoqing	11–3, 11–3	(gold) Winner
1992	Japan Open	(China) Ye Zhaoying	11–2, 11–0	(gold) Winner
1992	German Open	(Indonesia) Sarwendah Kusumawardhani	11–7, 10–12, 11–8	(gold) Winner
1992	Hong Kong Open	(South Korea) Bang Soo-hyun	11–5, 6–11, 7–11	(silver) Runner-up
1992	Thailand Open	(South Korea) Bang Soo-hyun	11–7, 11–4	(gold) Winner
1992	World Grand Prix Finals	(Indonesia) Sarwendah Kusumawardhani	9–11, 11–3, 11–4	(gold) Winner
1993	All England Open	(South Korea) Bang Soo-hyun	4–11, 11–4, 11–1	(gold) Winner
1993	Malaysia Open	(Sweden) Lim Xiaoqing	11–6, 11–2	(gold) Winner
1993	Indonesia Open	(China) Ye Zhaoying	9–11, 11–12	(silver) Runner-up
1993	Thailand Open	(Thailand) Somharuthai Jaroensiri	12–10, 11–2	(gold) Winner
1993	Korea Open	(South Korea) Bang Soo-hyun	9–12, 5–11	(silver) Runner-up
1993	German Open	(China) Ye Zhaoying	11–6, 11–8	(gold) Winner
1993	Dutch Open	(Denmark) Camilla Martin	11–7, 11–1	(gold) Winner
1993	World Grand Prix Finals	(China) Ye Zhaoying	11–3, 12–9	(gold) Winner
1994	Chinese Taipei Open	(South Korea) Kim Ji-hyun	11–2, 11–5	(gold) Winner
1994	All England Open	(China) Ye Zhaoying	11–5, 11–9	(gold) Winner
1994	Japan Open	(China) Ye Zhaoying	11–6, 10–12, 11–8	(gold) Winner
1994	Malaysia Open	(China) Ye Zhaoying	11–3, 11–8	(gold) Winner
1994	Thailand Open	(Sweden) Lim Xiaoqing	11–5, 12–10	(gold) Winner
1994	Indonesia Open	(South Korea) Bang Soo-hyun	2–11, 11–0, 11–7	(gold) Winner
1994	World Grand Prix Finals	(China) Ye Zhaoying	4–11, 12–10, 11–4	(gold) Winner
1995	Japan Open	(South Korea) Bang Soo-hyun	11–7, 12–11	(gold) Winner
1995	Malaysia Open	(South Korea) Bang Soo-hyun	11–1, 11–6	(gold) Winner
1995	Indonesia Open	(South Korea) Bang Soo-hyun	11–1, 12–11	(gold) Winner
1995	Korea Open	(South Korea) Bang Soo-hyun	3–11, 11–7, 11–9	(gold) Winner
1996	Japan Open	(China) Ye Zhaoying	7–11, 8–11	(silver) Runner-up
1996	Indonesia Open	(China) Wang Chen	11–8, 11–8	(gold) Winner
1996	Chinese Taipei Open	(China) Ye Zhaoying	11–5, 11–2	(gold) Winner
1996	World Grand Prix Finals	(China) Ye Zhaoying	11–4, 11–1	(gold) Winner
1997	Malaysia Open	(China) Ye Zhaoying	11–5, 11–7	(gold) Winner
1997	Indonesia Open	(Indonesia) Meiluawati	11–4, 11–5	(gold) Winner
1997	Vietnam Open	(China) Xu Huaiwen	11–4, 11–1	(gold) Winner
1997	World Grand Prix Finals	(China) Ye Zhaoying	4–11, 4–11	(silver) Runner-up
1998	Singapore Open	(China) Ye Zhaoying	5–11, 6–11, 2–11	(silver) Runner-up

Women's doubles
Year	Tournament	Partner	Opponent	Score	Result
1987	Indonesia Open	(Indonesia) Verawaty Fadjrin	(Indonesia) Rosiana Tendean (Indonesia) Ivana Lie	4–15, 16–17	(silver) Runner-up
1990	Australian Open	(Australia) Lisa Campbell	(Australia) Rhonda Cator (Australia) Anna Lao	8–15, 2–15	(silver) Runner-up

Mixed doubles
Year	Tournament	Partner	Opponent	Score	Result
1990	Australian Open	(Indonesia) Ardy Wiranata	(Hong Kong) He Tim (Australia) Anna Lao	11–15, 12–15	(silver) Runner-up

IBF Grand Prix tournament
IBF Grand Prix Finals tournament

=== IBF Junior International (2 titles) ===
Girls' singles
Year	Tournament	Opponent	Score	Result	Ref.
1987	Duinwijck Junior	(Indonesia) Lilik Sudarwati	11–2, 11–3	(gold) Winner	

Girls' doubles
Year	Tournament	Partner	Opponent	Score	Result	Ref.
1987	Duinwijck Junior	(Indonesia) Lilik Sudarwati	(Denmark) Tina Antonsen (Denmark) Siw Hemmingsen	5–11, 15–11, 15–6	(gold) Winner	

=== Invitational Tournament ===
Women's singles
Year	Tournament	Opponent	Score	Result
1988	Asian Invitational Championships	(China) Tang Jiuhong	1–11, 4–11	Bronze

== Record against selected opponents ==
Record against year-end Finals finalists, World Championships semi-finalists, and Olympic quarter-finalists.

Players	Matches	Results		Difference
Players	Matches	Won	Lost	Difference
(Australia) Anna Lao	1	1	0	+1
(China) Dai Yun	3	3	0	+3
(China) Gong Ruina	2	1	1	0
(China) Gong Zhichao	7	4	3	+1
(China) Han Aiping	5	1	4	–3
(China) Han Jingna	5	5	0	+5
(China) Huang Hua	10	7	3	+4
(China) Li Lingwei	3	0	3	–3
(China) Tang Jiuhong	12	5	7	–2
(China) Wang Chen	4	3	1	+2
(China) Xu Huaiwen	1	1	0	+1
(China) Yao Yan	5	5	0	+5
(China) Ye Zhaoying	34	23	11	+12
(China) Zhang Ning	6	5	1	+4

Players	Matches	Results		Difference
Players	Matches	Won	Lost	Difference
(Chinese Taipei) Huang Chia-chi	1	1	0	+1
(Denmark) Camilla Martin	15	15	0	+15
(Denmark) Mette Sørensen	2	2	0	+2
(England) Helen Troke	2	2	0	+2
(Japan) Yasuko Mizui	1	1	0	+1
(Indonesia) Mia Audina	1	1	0	+1
(Indonesia) Sarwendah Kusumawardhani	6	5	1	+4
(South Korea) Bang Soo-hyun	25	19	6	+13
(South Korea) Kim Ji-hyun	8	7	1	+6
(South Korea) Lee Heung-soon	4	4	0	+4
(South Korea) Lee Young-suk	6	3	3	0
(Sweden) Lim Xiaoqing	9	8	1	+7
(Thailand) Somharuthai Jaroensiri	12	12	0	+12
