= Tang Jiuhong =

Chinese badminton player

Tang Jiuhong 唐九红
Personal information
- Born: February 14, 1969 (age 57) Anhua, Hunan, China
- Height: 172 cm (5 ft 8 in)
- Weight: 65 kg (143 lb)

Sport
- Country: China
- Sport: Badminton
- Handedness: Right

Women's singles
- Highest ranking: 1
- BWF profile
Medal record
Women's badminton
Representing China
Olympic Games
Bronze medal – third place	1992 Barcelona	Women's singles
World Championships
Gold medal – first place	1991 Copenhagen	Women's singles
Bronze medal – third place	1989 Jakarta	Women's singles
Bronze medal – third place	1993 Birmingham	Women's singles
World Cup
Gold medal – first place	1992 Guangzhou	Women's singles
Bronze medal – third place	1989 Guangzhou	Women's singles
Bronze medal – third place	1990 Bandung-Jakarta	Women's singles
Sudirman Cup
Bronze medal – third place	1989 Jakarta	Mixed team
Bronze medal – third place	1991 Copenhagen	Mixed team
Bronze medal – third place	1993 Birmingham	Mixed team
Uber Cup
Gold medal – first place	1990 Tokyo	Women's team
Gold medal – first place	1992 Kuala Lumpur	Women's team
Asian Games
Gold medal – first place	1990 Beijing	Women's singles
Gold medal – first place	1990 Beijing	Women's team
Bronze medal – third place	1994 Hiroshima	Women's team
Asian Cup
Gold medal – first place	1991 Jakarta	Women's singles

Tang Jiuhong (Chinese: 唐九红; born February 14, 1969) is a former Chinese badminton star who was one of the world's leading women's singles players of the late 1980s and early 1990s.

== Career ==
She won the then biennial 1991 World Championship in 1991 and was a semifinalist in the 1989 World Championships and 1993 World Championships competitions. She was a bronze medalist in women's singles at the 1992 Summer Olympics. Her international singles titles included the prestigious All England Championship in 1992, as well as the Belgian (1988), Thailand (1989), Danish (1989, 1990), Swiss (1989), Singapore (1990), Korean (1992), and Swedish Opens (1992); the World Badminton Grand Prix in 1989, the quadrennial Asian Games in 1990, and the Badminton World Cup in 1992. Tang played on Chinese Uber Cup (women's international) teams that won world team titles in 1990 and 1992. In the late 1980s Tang and her fellow countrywoman Huang Hua were touted by some to be China's next generation of dominant female singles players, taking over from Li Lingwei and Han Aiping. Within a few years, however, they were upstaged by an even younger group of precocious badminton talents that included Indonesia's Susi Susanti, South Korea's Bang Soo-hyun, and China's own Ye Zhaoying.

Tang Jiuhong was brought up in Hunan by her elder brother Hui Tang and in effect his love of badminton introduced her to the sport. The badminton coach of the school where Hui Tang was training was impressed by his little 5-year-old sister Tang Jiuhong. He found that the tall girl's athleticism well suited for badminton. Soon little "Red Nine" as her nickname would become, was part of the County Amateur Sports School team. Four years later she was on the Hunan province badminton team. She won the National Youth Badminton Competition for three consecutive years in the women's singles event. She soon delivered more remarkable achievements winning the 1988 women's singles title at the National Badminton Championships. At the peak of her career she won 14 open events in one year, but her success also came at a price. Maintaining such high strength training for a long time led to severe physical discomfort. In 1992 when she was part of the winning Chinese Uber Cup team (her second Uber Cup title) she also had severe hematuria. To prepare for the Olympic Games, her coach arranged a base in the Beijing Miyun Reservoir where she could be nursed for a month, but the subsequent training still affected her health. The hematuria reappeared and affected her play at the 1992 Barcelona Olympic Games where she managed to reach the semifinals and earn a bronze medal. As pre-event favorite for the gold medal, however, her lopsided loss to Korean player Bang Soo-hyun received such negative criticism in China that she considered immediately retiring. But the Hunan Province Sports Bureau insisted that she persevere and after a period of rest her body eventually recovered. In 1993 she took another bronze medal at the individual world championships, again losing to Bang Soo-hyun but in an extremely close match. After winning women's singles at the Chinese national championships once more in 1993 Tang retired. In 1994 the Hunan Province government awarded her the title of "Most Outstanding Woman".

== Achievements ==
=== Olympic Games ===
Women's singles
Year	Venue	Opponent	Score	Result
1992	Pavelló de la Mar Bella; Barcelona, Spain	(South Korea) Bang Soo-hyun	3–11, 2–11	Bronze

=== World Championships ===
Women's singles
Year	Venue	Opponent	Score	Result
1993	National Indoor Arena; Birmingham, England	(South Korea) Bang Soo-hyun	3–11, 12–10, 10–12	Bronze
1991	Brøndby Arena; Copenhagen, Denmark	(Indonesia) Sarwendah Kusumawardhani	11–6, 11–1	Gold
1989	Senayan Sports Complex; Jakarta, Indonesia	(China) Li Lingwei	11–6, 8–11, 2–11	Bronze

=== World Cup ===
Women's singles
Year	Venue	Opponent	Score	Result
1989	Guangzhou Gymnasium; Guangzhou, China	(Indonesia) Susi Susanti	4–11, 12–10, 11–12	Bronze
1990	Istora Senayan; Jakarta, Indonesia	(Indonesia) Sarwendah Kusumawardhani	10–12, 11–6, 4–11	Bronze
1992	Guangdong Gymnasium; Guangzhou, China	(China) Huang Hua	11–8, 11–5	Gold

=== Asian Games ===
Women's singles
Year	Venue	Opponent	Score	Result
1990	Beijing Gymnasium; Beijing, China	(South Korea) Lee Young-suk	7–11, 11–7, 11–3	Gold

=== Asian Cup ===
Women's singles
Year	Venue	Opponent	Score	Result
1991	Istora Senayan; Jakarta, Indonesia	(South Korea) Bang Soo-hyun	11–7, 6–11, 11–4	Gold

=== IBF World Grand Prix ===
The World Badminton Grand Prix sanctioned by International Badminton Federation (IBF) from 1983 to 2006.

Women's singles
Year	Tournament	Opponent	Score	Result
1989	Poona Open	(China) Huang Hua	11–5, 11–8	(gold) Winner
1989	Swiss Open	(China) Huang Hua	12–9, 11–2	(gold) Winner
1989	Thailand Open	(China) Luo Yun	0–11, 11–3, 11–6	(gold) Winner
1989	China Open	(China) Zhou Lei	11–1, 11–7	(gold) Winner
1989	Denmark Open	(China) Han Aiping	11–0, 11–1	(gold) Winner
1989	Grand Prix Finals	(China) Han Aiping	12–11, 12–10	(gold) Winner
1990	Singapore Open	(South Korea) Lee Young-suk	12–9, 11–3	(gold) Winner
1990	Denmark Open	(China) Zhou Lei	11–3, 11–4	(gold) Winner
1990	Grand Prix Finals	(Indonesia) Susi Susanti	11–8, 5–11, 10–12	(silver) Runner-up
1991	Finnish Open	(England) Helen Troke	11–7, 11–8	(gold) Winner
1991	Malaysian Open	(Indonesia) Sarwendah Kusumawardhani	11–12, 1–11	(silver) Runner-up
1991	Hong Kong Open	(China) Huang Hua	10–12, 12–9, 9–12	(silver) Runner-up
1992	Korean Open	(South Korea) Bang Soo-hyun	11–6, 11–3	(gold) Winner
1992	Swedish Open	(Sweden) Lim Xiaoqing	11–5, 11–4	(gold) Winner
1992	All England Open	(South Korea) Bang Soo-hyun	9–12, 12–10, 11–1	(gold) Winner

Women's doubles
Year	Tournament	Partner	Opponent	Score	Result
1989	Swiss Open	(China) Huang Hua	(England) Cheryl Johnson (England) Claire Palmer	15–7, 18–17	(gold) Winner

=== Invitational tournament ===
Women's singles
Year	Tournament	Opponent	Score	Result
1988	Asian Invitational Championships; Bandar Lampung, Indonesia	(China) Huang Hua	11–5, 11–6	Gold

== Personal life ==
After her retirement Tang Jiuhong opened up a restaurant in her hometown of Hunan, and later also opened some branches in Beijing. In 1996, Tang Jiuhong emigrated to the United States, but soon returned to China, with her husband and child settling in Beijing. Later, because she could not adapt to the weather in Beijing, she returned to Hunan. She was then invited to act as secretary and director of the badminton management center which was established in the Hunan province, and began to engage in her sports management work. At the beginning of 2002, the Hunan Provincial Sports Bureau appointed Tang Jiuhong to the Yiyang City and she became the Chaoyang District deputy mayor, as a grass-roots testing exercise. Later she was promoted to deputy director of the Hunan Provincial Sports Bureau, and she was elected to the National People's congress.
