= Lee Young-suk =

South-Korean badminton player (born 1970)

Personal information
- Born: 9 May 1970 (age 56) Busan, South Korea
- Height: 1.70 m (5 ft 7 in)
- Weight: 60 kg (132 lb)

Sport
- Country: South Korea
- Sport: Badminton
- Handedness: Right
- BWF profile
Medal record
Women's badminton
Representing South Korea
Sudirman Cup
Silver medal – second place	1989 Jakarta	Mixed team
Uber Cup
Silver medal – second place	1988 Kuala Lumpur	Women's team
Silver medal – second place	1990 Nagoya & Tokyo	Women's team
Asian Games
Silver medal – second place	1990 Beijing	Women's singles
Bronze medal – third place	1990 Beijing	Women's team

Lee Young-suk (Korean: 이영숙; Hanja: 李英淑; born 9 May 1970) is a retired South Korean badminton player who affiliates with Busan City Hall since 1988. She is considered one of the most talented women's players with her exceptional speed around the court and power. She was the champion at the 1987 Denmark Open, 1988 Hong Kong Open, and 1990 Indonesia Open. At her peak, she was once ranked World No. 2 in women's singles.

After retiring from competitive play in the mid-1990s, she worked as a head coach at the Lee Jae Bok International Badminton Academy (LIBA) in Northampton, England. She is now the chairman of Hongsung badminton club in South Korea.

== Achievements ==
=== Asian Games ===
Women's singles
Year	Venue	Opponent	Score	Result
1990	Beijing Gymnasium; Beijing, China	(China) Tang Jiuhong	11–7, 7–11, 3–11	Silver

=== IBF World Grand Prix ===
The World Badminton Grand Prix sanctioned by International Badminton Federation (IBF) from 1983 to 2006.

Women's singles
Year	Tournament	Opponent	Score	Result
1987	Denmark Open	(South Korea) Chun Sung-suk	11–3, 11–5	(gold) Winner
1987	French Open	(South Korea) Kim Yun-ja	4–11, 11–5, 0–11	(silver) Runner-up
1988	Hong Kong Open	(China) Han Aiping	8–11, 11–1, 11–8	(gold) Winner
1988	All England Open	(China) Gu Jiaming	2–11, 2–11	(silver) Runner-up
1988	World Grand Prix Finals	(China) Han Aiping	1–11, 5–11	(silver) Runner-up
1990	French Open	(South Korea) Hwang Hye-young	4–11, 6–11	(silver) Runner-up
1990	Thailand Open	(China) Huang Hua	10–12, 12–11, 10–12	(silver) Runner-up
1990	Indonesia Open	(Indonesia) Susi Susanti	1–11, 11–8, 11–4	(gold) Winner
1990	Singapore Open	(China) Tang Jiuhong	9–12, 3–11	(silver) Runner-up

Women's doubles
Year	Tournament	Partner	Opponent	Score	Result
1989	Swedish Open	(South Korea) Hwang Hye-young	(South Korea) Chung Myung-hee (South Korea) Chung So-young	3–15, 5–15	(silver) Runner-up

=== IBF International ===
Women's singles
Year	Tournament	Opponent	Score	Result
1987	U. S. Open	(South Korea) Chun Sung-suk	2–11, 11–12	(silver) Runner-up
1988	Polish International	(China) Lin Yanfen	11–0, 11–1	(gold) Winner

Women's doubles
Year	Tournament	Partner	Opponent	Score	Result
1988	Polish International	(South Korea) Lee Heung-soon	(South Korea) Chung Myung-hee (South Korea) Hwang Hye-young	6–15, 9–15	(silver) Runner-up

=== Invitational Tournament ===
Women's singles
Year	Tournament	Opponent	Score	Result
1989	Konica Cup	(China) Han Aiping	0–11, 5–11	Silver

Women's doubles
Year	Tournament	Partner	Opponent	Score	Result
1988	Asian Invitational Championships; Bandar Lampung, Indonesia	(South Korea) Lee Heung-soon	(Indonesia) Verawaty Fadjrin (Indonesia) Yanti Kusmiati	7–15, 2–15	Bronze
