= Ghazala Wadood =

Pakistani badminton player

Ghazala Wadood غزالہ ودود
Personal information
- Born: Pakistan

Sport
- Country: Pakistan
- Sport: Badminton
- Handedness: Right
- Event: Singles, doubles and mixed doubles

Singles, doubles and mixed doubles
- BWF profile

Ghazala Wadood is a former badminton player from Pakistan. She represented her country from 1980 to 1992, and was a five-time national singles champion. She is the sister of Tariq Wadood, who was also a national badminton champion, and represented Pakistan in international competitions.

== Career ==
When Wadood started her career, women played very few sports such as squash, table tennis, tennis and athletics. She received support in her pursuits from her parents, both of whom were former sportspersons. Her brother is the former badminton world number 2, Tariq Wadood.

=== National ===
Wadood is a five-time national singles champion. She claimed her first title in 1983, and followed it up with victories in 1984, 1985, 1989, and 1990. For three consecutive years, both brother and sister were Pakistan national champions (1983-1985).

=== International ===
Wadood represented Pakistan internationally between 1980 and 1992.

In 1990, she competed at the Asian Games in Beijing, China. Participating in singles, doubles and mixed doubles events, she lost in the round of 16 in all three events. In singles, she lost to Thailand's Somharuthai Jaroensiri 1-11 and 2-11. In women's doubles, she partnered with Afshan Shakeel. They lost to the Chinese pair of Guan Weizhen and Nong Qunhua by 5-15 and 4-15.

In 1991, Wadood was scheduled to play at the World Championships, but ended up not competing.
