= 1991 Badminton World Cup =

Badminton championships

Tournament details
- Dates: 7–10 August 1991
- Edition: 13th
- Total prize money: US$145,000
- Venue: Macau Forum
- Location: Portuguese Macau

The 1991 Badminton World Cup was the thirteenth edition of an international tournament Badminton World Cup. The event was held in Portuguese Macau from 7 August to 10 August 1991. Indonesia won the men's singles and mixed doubles events while China won the women's singles. Malaysia secured a title in men's doubles discipline & South Korea clinched the women's doubles title.

== Medalists ==
Event	Gold	Silver	Bronze
Men's singles	(Indonesia) Ardy Wiranata	(China) Zhao Jianhua	(China) Wu Wenkai
Men's singles	(Indonesia) Ardy Wiranata	(China) Zhao Jianhua	(China) Liu Jun
Women's singles	(China) Huang Hua	(Indonesia) Sarwendah Kusumawardhani	(Indonesia) Susi Susanti
Women's singles	(China) Huang Hua	(Indonesia) Sarwendah Kusumawardhani	(South Korea) Lee Heung-soon
Men's doubles	(Malaysia) Jalani Sidek (Malaysia) Razif Sidek	(South Korea) Kim Moon-soo (South Korea) Park Joo-bong	(China) Li Yongbo (China) Tian Bingyi
Men's doubles	(Malaysia) Jalani Sidek (Malaysia) Razif Sidek	(South Korea) Kim Moon-soo (South Korea) Park Joo-bong	(China) Chen Kang (China) Chen Hongyong
Women's doubles	(South Korea) Chung So-young (South Korea) Hwang Hye-young	(Indonesia) Rosiana Tendean (Indonesia) Erma Sulistianingsih	(England) Gillian Clark (Denmark) Nettie Nielsen
Women's doubles	(South Korea) Chung So-young (South Korea) Hwang Hye-young	(Indonesia) Rosiana Tendean (Indonesia) Erma Sulistianingsih	(China) Lai Caiqin (China) Yao Fen
Mixed doubles	(Indonesia) Rudy Gunawan (Indonesia) Rosiana Tendean	(Denmark) Thomas Lund (Denmark) Pernille Dupont	(South Korea) Kim Hak-kyun (South Korea) Hwang Hye-young
Mixed doubles	(Indonesia) Rudy Gunawan (Indonesia) Rosiana Tendean	(Denmark) Thomas Lund (Denmark) Pernille Dupont	(Sweden) Pär-Gunnar Jönsson (Sweden) Maria Bengtsson

== Men's singles ==
=== Finals ===
Semi-finals
(China) Zhao Jianhua	15	15
(China) Liu Jun	10	12
(China) Wu Wenkai	16	3
(Indonesia) Ardy Wiranata	18	15

Final
(China) Zhao Jianhua	15	7	10
(Indonesia) Ardy Wiranata	12	15	15

== Women's singles ==
=== Finals ===
Semi-finals
(China) Huang Hua	11	11
(Indonesia) Susi Susanti	3	2
(South Korea) Lee Heung-soon	1	11	7
(Indonesia) Sarwendah Kusumawardhani	11	7	11

Final
(China) Huang Hua	12	11
(Indonesia) Sarwendah Kusumawardhani	11	5

== Men's doubles ==
=== Finals ===
Semi-finals
(Malaysia) Jalani Sidek (Malaysia) Razif Sidek	10	15	15
(China) Chen Hongyong (China) Chen Kang	15	7	9
(China) Li Yongbo (China) Tian Bingyi	16	14
(South Korea) Kim Moon-soo (South Korea) Park Joo-bong	17	17

Final
(Malaysia) Jalani Sidek (Malaysia) Razif Sidek	15	15	15
(South Korea) Kim Moon-soo (South Korea) Park Joo-bong	18	11	2

== Women's doubles ==
=== Finals ===
Semi-finals
(South Korea) Chung So-young (South Korea) Hwang Hye-young	15	18
(England) Gillian Clark (Denmark) Nettie Nielsen	5	16
(Indonesia) Erma Sulistianingsih (Indonesia) Rosiana Tendean	15	12	15
(China) Lai Caiqin (China) Yao Fen	10	15	7

Final
(South Korea) Chung So-young (South Korea) Hwang Hye-young	15	15
(Indonesia) Erma Sulistianingsih (Indonesia) Rosiana Tendean	3	3

== Mixed doubles ==
=== Finals ===
Semi-finals
(Indonesia) Rudy Gunawan (Indonesia) Rosiana Tendean	15	15
(South Korea) Kim Hak-kyun (South Korea) Hwang Hye-young	8	9
(Sweden) Pär-Gunnar Jönsson (Sweden) Maria Bengtsson	4	2
(Denmark) Thomas Lund (Denmark) Pernille Dupont	15	15

Final
(Indonesia) Rudy Gunawan (Indonesia) Rosiana Tendean	15	15
(Denmark) Thomas Lund (Denmark) Pernille Dupont	10	9
