= Badminton World Cup =

Badminton championships

The World Cup in badminton was an annual tournament organized by the International Management Group (IMG). It was held from 1979 to 1997. After the tournament ceased for seven years, Badminton World Federation decided to bring it back as an invitational tournament in 2005, but it ended after the 2006 event.

== Locations ==
Year	No.	Host city	Country
1979	I	Tokyo	Japan
1980	II	Kyoto	Japan
1981	III	Kuala Lumpur	Malaysia
1982	IV	Kuala Lumpur	Malaysia
1983	V	Kuala Lumpur	Malaysia
1984	VI	Jakarta	Indonesia
1985	VII	Jakarta	Indonesia
1986	VIII	Jakarta	Indonesia
1987	IX	Kuala Lumpur	Malaysia
1988	X	Bangkok	Thailand
1989	XI	Guangzhou	China
1990	XII	Bandung/Jakarta	Indonesia
1991	XIII	Macau	Macau
1992	XIV	Guangzhou	China
1993	XV	New Delhi	India
1994	XVI	Ho Chi Minh City	Vietnam
1995	XVII	Jakarta	Indonesia
1996	XVIII	Jakarta	Indonesia
1997	XIX	Yogyakarta	Indonesia
2005	XX	Yiyang	China
2006	XXI	Yiyang	China

== Past winners ==
Year	Men's singles	Women's singles	Men's doubles	Women's doubles	Mixed doubles
1979	(Indonesia) Liem Swie King	(Denmark) Lene Køppen	(Indonesia) Ade Chandra (Indonesia) Christian Hadinata	(Japan) Emiko Ueno (Japan) Yoshiko Yonekura	no competition
1980	(Indonesia) Liem Swie King	(Denmark) Lene Køppen	(Indonesia) Ade Chandra (Indonesia) Christian Hadinata	(Japan) Atsuko Tokuda (Japan) Yoshiko Yonekura	no competition
1981	(India) Prakash Padukone	(China) Chen Ruizhen	no competition	no competition	no competition
1982	(Indonesia) Liem Swie King	(Denmark) Lene Køppen	no competition	no competition	no competition
1983	(China) Han Jian	(China) Han Aiping	(South Korea) Kim Moon-soo (South Korea) Park Joo-bong	(China) Han Aiping (China) Li Lingwei	(England) Martin Dew (England) Gillian Gilks
1984	(China) Han Jian	(China) Li Lingwei	(Indonesia) Hariamanto Kartono (Indonesia) Liem Swie King	(China) Lin Ying (China) Wu Dixi	(Sweden) Thomas Kihlström (England) Nora Perry
1985	(Indonesia) Icuk Sugiarto	(China) Li Lingwei	(Indonesia) Hariamanto Kartono (Indonesia) Liem Swie King	(China) Lin Ying (China) Wu Dixi	(Indonesia) Christian Hadinata (Indonesia) Ivana Lie
1986	(Indonesia) Icuk Sugiarto	(China) Li Lingwei	(Indonesia) Bobby Ertanto (Indonesia) Liem Swie King	(China) Han Aiping (China) Li Lingwei	(Indonesia) Eddy Hartono (Indonesia) Verawaty Fadjrin
1987	(China) Zhao Jianhua	(China) Li Lingwei	(South Korea) Kim Moon-soo (South Korea) Park Joo-bong	(China) Han Aiping (China) Li Lingwei	(China) Wang Pengren (China) Shi Fangjing
1988	(China) Yang Yang	(China) Han Aiping	(China) Li Yongbo (China) Tian Bingyi	(China) Guan Weizhen (China) Lin Ying	(China) Wang Pengren (China) Shi Fangjing
1989	(China) Yang Yang	(Indonesia) Susi Susanti	(South Korea) Kim Moon-soo (South Korea) Park Joo-bong	(China) Guan Weizhen (China) Lin Ying	(South Korea) Park Joo-bong (South Korea) Chung Myung-hee
1990	(China) Wu Wenkai	(Indonesia) Sarwendah Kusumawardhani	(Malaysia) Jalani Sidek (Malaysia) Razif Sidek	(China) Lai Caiqin (China) Yao Fen	(Indonesia) Rudy Gunawan (Indonesia) Rosiana Tendean
1991	(Indonesia) Ardy Wiranata	(China) Huang Hua	(Malaysia) Jalani Sidek (Malaysia) Razif Sidek	(South Korea) Chung So-young (South Korea) Hwang Hye-young	(Indonesia) Rudy Gunawan (Indonesia) Rosiana Tendean
1992	(Indonesia) Joko Suprianto	(China) Tang Jiuhong	(Malaysia) Cheah Soon Kit (Malaysia) Soo Beng Kiang	(China) Lin Yanfen (China) Yao Fen	(Indonesia) Rudy Gunawan (Indonesia) Rosiana Tendean
1993	(Indonesia) Alan Budikusuma	(Indonesia) Susi Susanti	(Indonesia) Rexy Mainaky (Indonesia) Ricky Subagja	(Sweden) Lim Xiaoqing (Sweden) Christine Magnusson	(Sweden) Peter Axelsson (England) Gillian Gowers
1994	(Indonesia) Hariyanto Arbi	(Indonesia) Susi Susanti	(Malaysia) Cheah Soon Kit (Malaysia) Soo Beng Kiang	(Indonesia) Finarsih (Indonesia) Lili Tampi	(Denmark) Thomas Lund (Sweden) Catrine Bengtsson
1995	(Indonesia) Joko Suprianto	(China) Ye Zhaoying	(Indonesia) Rexy Mainaky (Indonesia) Ricky Subagja	(Indonesia) Eliza Nathanael (Indonesia) Zelin Resiana	(Indonesia) Tri Kusharjanto (Indonesia) Minarti Timur
1996	(China) Dong Jiong	(Indonesia) Susi Susanti	(Indonesia) Antonius Ariantho (Indonesia) Denny Kantono	(China) Ge Fei (China) Gu Jun	(Indonesia) Sandiarto (Indonesia) Minarti Timur
1997	(China) Sun Jun	(Indonesia) Susi Susanti	(Indonesia) Rexy Mainaky (Indonesia) Ricky Subagja	(China) Ge Fei (China) Gu Jun	(China) Liu Yong (China) Ge Fei
1998-2004	Not held				
2005	(China) Lin Dan	(China) Xie Xingfang	(China) Cai Yun (China) Fu Haifeng	(China) Yang Wei (China) Zhang Jiewen	(China) Xie Zhongbo (China) Zhang Yawen
2006	(China) Lin Dan	(China) Wang Yihan	(Indonesia) Markis Kido (Indonesia) Hendra Setiawan	(China) Gao Ling (China) Huang Sui	(Indonesia) Nova Widianto (Indonesia) Liliyana Natsir

== Medal table ==
World Cup all time medal table
Rank	Nation	Gold	Silver	Bronze	Total
1	China	41	33	52	126
2	Indonesia	36	31	46	113
3	South Korea	5	11	16	32
4	Denmark	4.5	6	21	31.5
5	Malaysia	4	4	15	23
6	Japan	3	4	7	14
7	Sweden	2.5	1	10	13.5
8	England	2	3.5	14.5	20
9	India	1	0	1	2
10	Thailand	0	2	2	4
11	Netherlands	0	0	2	2
12	Chinese Taipei	0	0	1	1
12	Russia	0	0	1	1
12	United States	0	0	1	1
Totals (14 entries)		99	95.5	189.5	384
