= Huang Hua (badminton) =

Chinese badminton player

Huang Hua 黄华
Personal information
- Born: November 16, 1969 (age 56) Guangxi, China
- Height: 171 cm (5 ft 7 in)
- Weight: 55 kg (121 lb)

Sport
- Country: China
- Sport: Badminton

Women's singles
- Highest ranking: 1
- BWF profile
Medal record
Women's badminton
Representing China
Olympic Games
Bronze medal – third place	1992 Barcelona	Women's singles
World Championships
Silver medal – second place	1989 Jakarta	Women's singles
World Cup
Gold medal – first place	1991 Macau	Women's singles
Silver medal – second place	1992 Guangzhou	Women's singles
Bronze medal – third place	1988 Bangkok	Women's singles
Bronze medal – third place	1989 Guangzhou	Women's singles
Bronze medal – third place	1990 Bandung-Jakarta	Women's singles
Uber Cup
Gold medal – first place	1990 Tokyo	Women's team
Gold medal – first place	1992 Kuala Lumpur	Women's team
Asian Games
Gold medal – first place	1990 Beijing	Women's team
Bronze medal – third place	1990 Beijing	Women's singles

Huang Hua (Chinese: 黄华; born November 16, 1969) is a Chinese female badminton player who won major international titles in the early 1990s.

== Career ==
Huang and her contemporary Tang Jiuhong were the leading Chinese singles players between the era of Han Aiping and Li Lingwei (most of the 1980s) and the era of Ye Zhaoying (mid to late 1990s). She played for Chinese Uber Cup (women's international) teams that won world team championships in 1990 and 1992. Her singles titles included the Swedish (1990), Thailand (1990), Malaysia (1990, 1992), Korea (1991), Singapore (1991), Japan (1990, 1991), and China (1991) Opens. She was a runner-up in the 1989 World Championships and in the prestigious All-England Championships in 1990. Huang won the 1991 Badminton World Cup held in Macau and was a bronze medalist in the 1992 Barcelona Olympics, losing in the semi-finals to Susi Susanti of Indonesia, the eventual winner.

== Playing style ==
Susi Susanti, one of Huang's rivals, described her as a "complete player" who was "slightly different" from other Chinese players. "Usually Chinese players are sharp and fast. Huang Hua's playing style is more stylish and elegant," said Susanti in an interview.

== Achievements ==
=== Olympic Games ===
Women's singles
Year	Venue	Opponent	Score	Result
1992	Pavelló de la Mar Bella; Barcelona, Spain	(Indonesia) Susi Susanti	4–11, 1–11	Bronze

=== World Championships ===
Women's singles
Year	Venue	Opponent	Score	Result
1989	Istora Senayan; Jakarta, Indonesia	(China) Li Lingwei	6–11, 9–12	Silver

=== World Cup ===
Women's singles
Year	Venue	Opponent	Score	Result
1988	National Stadium; Bangkok, Thailand	(China) Li Lingwei	7–11, 8–11	Bronze
1989	Guangzhou Gymnasium; Guangzhou, China	(China) Han Aiping	12–10, 8–11, 4–11	Bronze
1990	Istora Senayan; Jakarta, Indonesia	(Indonesia) Susi Susanti	8–11, 11–1, 2–11	Bronze
1991	Macau Forum, Portuguese Macau	(Indonesia) Sarwendah Kusumawardhani	12–11, 11–5	Gold
1992	Guangdong Gymnasium; Guangzhou, China	(China) Tang Jiuhong	8–11, 5–11	Silver

=== Asian Games ===
Women's singles
Year	Venue	Opponent	Score	Result
1990	Beijing Gymnasium; Beijing, China	(South Korea) Lee Young-suk	Walkover	Bronze

=== IBF World Grand Prix ===
The World Badminton Grand Prix sanctioned by International Badminton Federation (IBF) from 1983 to 2006.

Women's singles
Year	Tournament	Opponent	Score	Result
1988	China Open	(China) Li Lingwei	1–11, 11–7, 9–11	(silver) Runner-up
1988	Thailand Open	(China) Li Lingwei	11–3, 6–11, 6–11	(silver) Runner-up
1989	Japan Open	(China) Li Lingwei	4–11, 2–11	(silver) Runner-up
1989	Poona Open	(China) Tang Jiuhong	5–11, 8–11	(silver) Runner-up
1989	Swiss Open	(China) Tang Jiuhong	9–12, 2–11	(silver) Runner-up
1989	Indonesian Open	(Indonesia) Susi Susanti	11–7, 11–0	(gold) Winner
1990	Japan Open	(China) Zhou Lei	11–6, 11–0	(gold) Winner
1990	Swedish Open	(China) Zhou Lei	11–5, 11–1	(gold) Winner
1990	All England Open	(Indonesia) Susi Susanti	11–12, 1–11	(silver) Runner-up
1990	Thailand Open	(South Korea) Lee Young-suk	12–10, 11–12, 12–10	(gold) Winner
1990	Malaysian Open	(South Korea) Lee Jung-mi	11–3, 7–11, 11–1	(gold) Winner
1991	Japan Open	(Indonesia) Susi Susanti	11–3, 11–6	(gold) Winner
1991	Korean Open	(China) Zhou Lei	11–2, 12–10	(gold) Winner
1991	Singapore Open	(China) Zhou Lei	11–5, 7–11, 11–2	(gold) Winner
1991	German Open	(Denmark) Pernille Nedergaard	11–1, 6–11, 11–7	(gold) Winner
1991	Denmark Open	(Indonesia) Susi Susanti	5–11, 11–6, 8–11	(silver) Runner-up
1991	China Open	(Indonesia) Sarwendah Kusumawardhani	11–12, 11–6, 11–2	(gold) Winner
1991	Hong Kong Open	(China) Tang Jiuhong	12–10, 9–12, 12–9	(gold) Winner
1992	Malaysian Open	(Indonesia) Yuni Kartika	11–3, 7–11, 11–7	(gold) Winner

Women's doubles
Year	Tournament	Partner	Opponent	Score	Result
1989	Swiss Open	(China) Tang Jiuhong	(England) Cheryl Johnson (England) Claire Palmer	15–7, 18–17	(gold) Winner
1990	Swedish Open	(China) Zhou Lei	(Netherlands) Eline Coene (Netherlands) Erica van den Heuvel	3–15, 18–15, 15–12	(gold) Winner

=== Invitational tournament ===
Women's singles
Year	Tournament	Opponent	Score	Result
1988	Asian Invitational Championships; Bandar Lampung, Indonesia	(China) Tang Jiuhong	5–11, 6–11	Silver
1988	Konica Cup; Geylang, Singapore	(China) Li Lingwei	9–12, 6–11	Silver

== Personal life ==
She became an Indonesian citizen after marrying the Chinese-Indonesian businessman Tjandra Budi Darmawan (Chinese: 张志融, Zhang Zhi Rong) in 1993. She has three children: Tjandra Michael, Tjandra William, and Tjandra Christian. She now lives in Klaten, Central Java.
