= Zhou Lei =

Chinese badminton player (born 1970)

Zhou Lei 周雷
Personal information
- Born: 25 January 1970 (age 56)
- Height: 166 cm (5 ft 5 in)

Sport
- Country: China
- Sport: Badminton
- Handedness: Right
Medal record
Women's Badminton
Representing China
World Championships
Gold medal – first place	1993 Birmingham	Women's doubles
Bronze medal – third place	1989 Jakarta	Women's doubles
World Cup
Bronze medal – third place	1989 Guangzhou	Women's doubles
Sudirman Cup
Bronze medal – third place	1989 Jakarta	Mixed team
Bronze medal – third place	1993 Birmingham	Mixed team
Uber Cup
Gold medal – first place	1990 Tokyo	Women's team
Asian Games
Gold medal – first place	1990 Beijing	Women's team
Asian Championships
Silver medal – second place	1992 Kuala Lumpur	Women's singles

Zhou Lei (Chinese: 周雷) is a former world level badminton player from China who later coached in the United States.

== Career ==
Primarily a doubles specialist, Zhou's biggest badminton achievement was winning women's doubles at the 1993 IBF World Championships in Birmingham, England with compatriot Nong Qunhua. Zhou also shared women's doubles titles at the French (1989), Swedish (1990), Thailand (1992), and Hong Kong (1992) Opens. In 1989 she was a runner-up at the prestigious All-England Championships and a bronze medalist at the IBF World Championships with Sun Xiaoqing. Zhou was a women's singles runner-up to Tang Jiuhong at the Denmark Open in 1990. She was a member of the world champion Chinese Uber Cup (women's international) teams of 1990 and 1992. After retiring, she became head coach of Peru's national team. Now, she currently coaches in the US at Z Badminton Training Center in Union City, where she is also the founder and owner of the club until it was closed.

== Achievements ==
=== World Championships ===
Women's Doubles
Year	Venue	Partner	Opponent	Score	Result
1989	Istora Senayan; Jakarta, Indonesia	(China) Sun Xiaoqing	(South Korea) Chung Myung-hee (South Korea) Hwang Hye-young	15–13, 1–15, 4–15	Bronze
1993	National Indoor Arena; Birmingham, England	(China) Nong Qunhua	(China) Chen Ying (China) Wu Yuhong	15–5, 15–10	Gold

=== World Cup ===
Women's Doubles
Year	Venue	Partner	Opponent	Score	Result
1989	Guangzhou Gymnasium; Guangzhou, China	(China) Sun Xiaoqing	(China) Guan Weizhen (China) Lin Ying	7–15, 4–15	Bronze

=== Asian Championships ===
Women's Singles
Year	Venue	Opponent	Score	Result
1992	Cheras Indoor Stadium; Kuala Lumpur, Malaysia	(China) Ye Zhaoying	10–12, 2–11	Silver

=== IBF World Grand Prix ===
The World Badminton Grand Prix was sanctioned by the International Badminton Federation from 1983 to 2006.

Women's Singles
Year	Tournament	Opponent	Score	Result
1989	French Open	(China) Li Lingwei	5–11, 3–11	(silver) Runner-up
1989	Hong Kong Open	(China) Han Aiping	12–11, 7–11, 3–11	(silver) Runner-up
1989	China Open	(China) Tang Jiuhong	1–11, 7–11	(silver) Runner-up
1990	Japan Open	(China) Huang Hua	6–11, 0–11	(silver) Runner-up
1990	Swedish Open	(China) Huang Hua	5–11, 1–11	(silver) Runner-up
1990	Denmark Open	(China) Tang Jiuhong	3–11, 4–11	(silver) Runner-up
1991	Korea Open	(China) Huang Hua	2–11, 10–12	(silver) Runner-up
1991	Singapore Open	(China) Huang Hua	5–11, 11–7, 2–11	(silver) Runner-up

Women's Doubles
Year	Tournament	Partner	Opponent	Score	Result
1987	Thailand Open	(China) Luo Yun	(China) Guan Weizhen (China) Lin Ying	15–6, 5–15, 11–15	(silver) Runner-up
1988	China Open	(China) Sun Xiaoqing	(China) Guan Weizhen (China) Lin Ying	8–15, 4–15	(silver) Runner-up
1989	All England Open	(China) Sun Xiaoqing	(South Korea) Chung Myung-hee (South Korea) Chung So-young	7–15, 4–15	(silver) Runner-up
1989	French Open	(China) Sun Xiaoqing	(China) Chiu Mei Yin (China) Li Lingwei	15–9, 15–10	(gold) Winner
1989	China Open	(China) Sun Xiaoqing	(China) Guan Weizhen (China) Lin Ying	15–12, 5–15, 4–15	(silver) Runner-up
1990	Swedish Open	(China) Huang Hua	(Netherlands) Eline Coene (Netherlands) Erica van den Heuvel	3–15, 18–15, 15–12	(gold) Winner
1992	Hong Kong Open	(China) Nong Qunhua	(Indonesia) Erma Sulistianingsih (Indonesia) Rosiana Tendean	15–8, 15–6	(gold) Winner
1992	Thailand Open	(China) Nong Qunhua	(Indonesia) Erma Sulistianingsih (Indonesia) Rosiana Tendean	15–4, 12–15, 15–8	(gold) Winner
1993	French Open	(China) Nong Qunhua	(China) Lin Yanfen (China) Yao Fen	10–15, 15–17	(silver) Runner-Up

=== Invitational Tournament ===
Women's Doubles
Year	Tournament	Partner	Opponent	Score	Result
1988	Konica Cup	(China) Shi Wen	(China) Huang Hua (China) Tang Jiuhong	15–10, 15–12	(gold) Winner
