= Sarwendah Kusumawardhani =

Indonesian badminton player (born 1967)

Personal information
- Born: Sarwendah Kusumawardhani Sukiran; 22 August 1967 (age 59) Madiun, East Java, Indonesia
- Height: 1.70 m (5 ft 7 in)
- Spouse: Hermawan Susanto (m. 1995)

Sport
- Country: Indonesia
- Sport: Badminton
- Handedness: Right

Women's singles
- Highest ranking: 3 (October 1991)
- BWF profile
Medal record
Women's badminton
Representing Indonesia
World Championships
Silver medal – second place	1991 Copenhagen	Women's singles
Bronze medal – third place	1989 Jakarta	Women's singles
World Cup
Gold medal – first place	1990 Bandung–Jakarta	Women's singles
Silver medal – second place	1991 Macau	Women's singles
Sudirman Cup
Gold medal – first place	1989 Jakarta	Mixed team
Silver medal – second place	1991 Copenhagen	Mixed team
Silver medal – second place	1993 Birmingham	Mixed team
Uber Cup
Silver medal – second place	1986 Jakarta	Women's team
Bronze medal – third place	1988 Kuala Lumpur	Women's team
Bronze medal – third place	1990 Nagoya–Tokyo	Women's team
Bronze medal – third place	1992 Kuala Lumpur	Women's team
Asian Games
Silver medal – second place	1990 Beijing	Women's team
Bronze medal – third place	1986 Seoul	Women's team
SEA Games
Gold medal – first place	1987 Jakarta	Women's team
Gold medal – first place	1989 Kuala Lumpur	Women's team
Gold medal – first place	1991 Manila	Women's team
Gold medal – first place	1993 Singapore	Women's singles
Gold medal – first place	1993 Singapore	Women's team
Silver medal – second place	1989 Kuala Lumpur	Women's singles
Silver medal – second place	1991 Manila	Women's singles
Southeast Asian Junior Championships
Gold medal – first place	1984 Kuala Lumpur	Mixed doubles
Gold medal – first place	1984 Kuala Lumpur	Girls' team

Sarwendah Kusumawardhani Sukiran (born 22 August 1967) is a retired badminton player from Indonesia. She was the women's singles champions at the 1990 World Cup and 1993 SEA Games. Kusumawardhani was part of Indonesia winning team at the inaugural Sudirman Cup, also the women's team event of SEA Games in 1987, 1989, 1991 and 1993.

== Career ==
Kusumawardhani was rated among the world's leading singles players in the late 1980s and early 1990s, though she was somewhat overshadowed by her younger Indonesian teammate, Susi Susanti. Her titles included the Dutch Open (1987, 1991, 1992), the Swiss Open (1990, 1991), the Malaysia Open (1991), the World Cup (1990), and the SEA Games (1993). Kusumawardhani came close in badminton's three most prestigious tournaments for individual players. She was a bronze medalist at the 1989 IBF World Championships and a silver medalist to China's Tang Jiuhong at the tournament's next edition in 1991. She was also runner-up at the venerable All-England Championships in 1991, this time to Susanti. At the 1992 Barcelona Olympics won by Susanti, Kusumawardhani narrowly missed reaching the medal rounds after an extremely tight quarterfinal loss to the eventual silver medalist Bang Soo-hyun.

== Personal life ==
Kusumawardhani is married to Hermawan Susanto who was one of Indonesia's and the world's leading men's singles players in the 1990s. Her elder sister, Ratih Kumaladewi is also a former national badminton player.

After retiring from her playing career, Kusumawardhani began a new path as a coach. She started out at PB Tangkas and eventually opened her own academy, Sarwendah Badminton Club, in 2010. She also coached the women's singles squad under the Badminton Association of Indonesia, but resigned in 2011, citing incompatibility with head coach Li Mao. She was rehired in 2013 as the assistant coach for women's singles.

== Achievements ==
=== World Championships ===
Women's singles
Year	Venue	Opponent	Score	Result
1989	Senayan Sports Complex; Jakarta, Indonesia	(China) Huang Hua	11–8, 7–11, 2–11	Bronze
1991	Brøndby Arena; Copenhagen, Denmark	(China) Tang Jiuhong	6–11, 1–11	Silver

=== World Cup ===
Women's singles
Year	Venue	Opponent	Score	Result
1990	Istora Senayan; Jakarta, Indonesia	(Indonesia) Susi Susanti	11–5, 1–11, 12–11	Gold
1991	Macau Forum, Macau	(China) Huang Hua	11–12, 5–11	Silver

=== SEA Games ===
Women's singles
Year	Venue	Opponent	Score	Result
1989	Stadium Negara; Kuala Lumpur, Malaysia	(Indonesia) Susi Susanti	7–11, 6–11	Silver
1991	Camp Crame Gymnasium; Manila, Philippines	(Indonesia) Susi Susanti	11–5, 8–11, 2–11	Silver
1993	Singapore Badminton Hall, Singapore	(Indonesia) Yuliani Santosa	11–6, 9–11, 11–2	Gold

=== IBF World Grand Prix (4 titles, 7 runners-up) ===
The World Badminton Grand Prix has been sanctioned by the International Badminton Federation from 1983 to 2006.

Women's singles
Year	Tournament	Opponent	Score	Result
1987	Dutch Open	(Netherlands) Eline Coene	12–11, 12–11	(gold) Winner
1987	Poona Open	(Netherlands) Astrid van der Knaap	2–11, 0–11	(silver) Runner-up
1991	All England Open	(Indonesia) Susi Susanti	11–0, 2–11, 6–11	(silver) Runner-up
1991	Malaysia Open	(China) Tang Jiuhong	12–11, 11–1	(gold) Winner
1991	Dutch Open	(Netherlands) Eline Coene	11–3, 11–3	(gold) Winner
1991	China Open	(China) Huang Hua	12–11, 6–11, 2–11	(silver) Runner-up
1992	Indonesia Open	(China) Ye Zhaoying	7–11, 6–11	(silver) Runner-up
1992	Dutch Open	(Sweden) Lim Xiaoqing	11–4, 11–8	(gold) Winner
1992	German Open	(Indonesia) Susi Susanti	7–11, 12–10, 8–11	(silver) Runner-up
1992	World Grand Prix Finals	(Indonesia) Susi Susanti	11–9, 3–11, 4–11	(silver) Runner-up

Women's doubles
Year	Tournament	Partner	Opponent	Score	Result
1987	Poona Open	(Indonesia) Erma Sulistianingsih	(England) Gillian Clark (England) Gillian Gowers	3–15, 5–15	(silver) Runner-up

IBF Grand Prix tournament
IBF Grand Prix Finals tournament

=== IBF International (3 titles, 1 runner-up) ===
Women's singles
Year	Tournament	Opponent	Score	Result	Ref.
1986	Silver Bowl International	(Australia) Julie McDonald	9–11, 7–11	(silver) Runner-up	
1986	Auckland International	(Malaysia) Leong Chai Lean	11–1, 10–12, 11–7	(gold) Winner	

Women's doubles
Year	Tournament	Partner	Opponent	Score	Result	Ref.
1986	Silver Bowl International	(Indonesia) Rosiana Tendean	(Indonesia) Erma Sulistianingsih (Indonesia) Dwi Elmiyati	15–7, 15–6	(gold) Winner	
1986	Auckland International	(Indonesia) Rosiana Tendean	(Indonesia) Erma Sulistianingsih (Indonesia) Dwi Elmiyati	15–7, 15–12	(gold) Winner	

=== IBF Junior International (1 runner-up) ===
Girls' doubles
Year	Tournament	Partner	Opponent	Score	Result	Ref.
1984	Jakarta Junior Open	(Indonesia) Dwi Handayani	(Denmark) Lisbet Stuer-Lauridsen (Denmark) Marian Christiansen	15–17, 3–15	(silver) Runner-up	
