= Beijing Gymnasium =

Sports venue in Beijing, China

- 北京体育馆
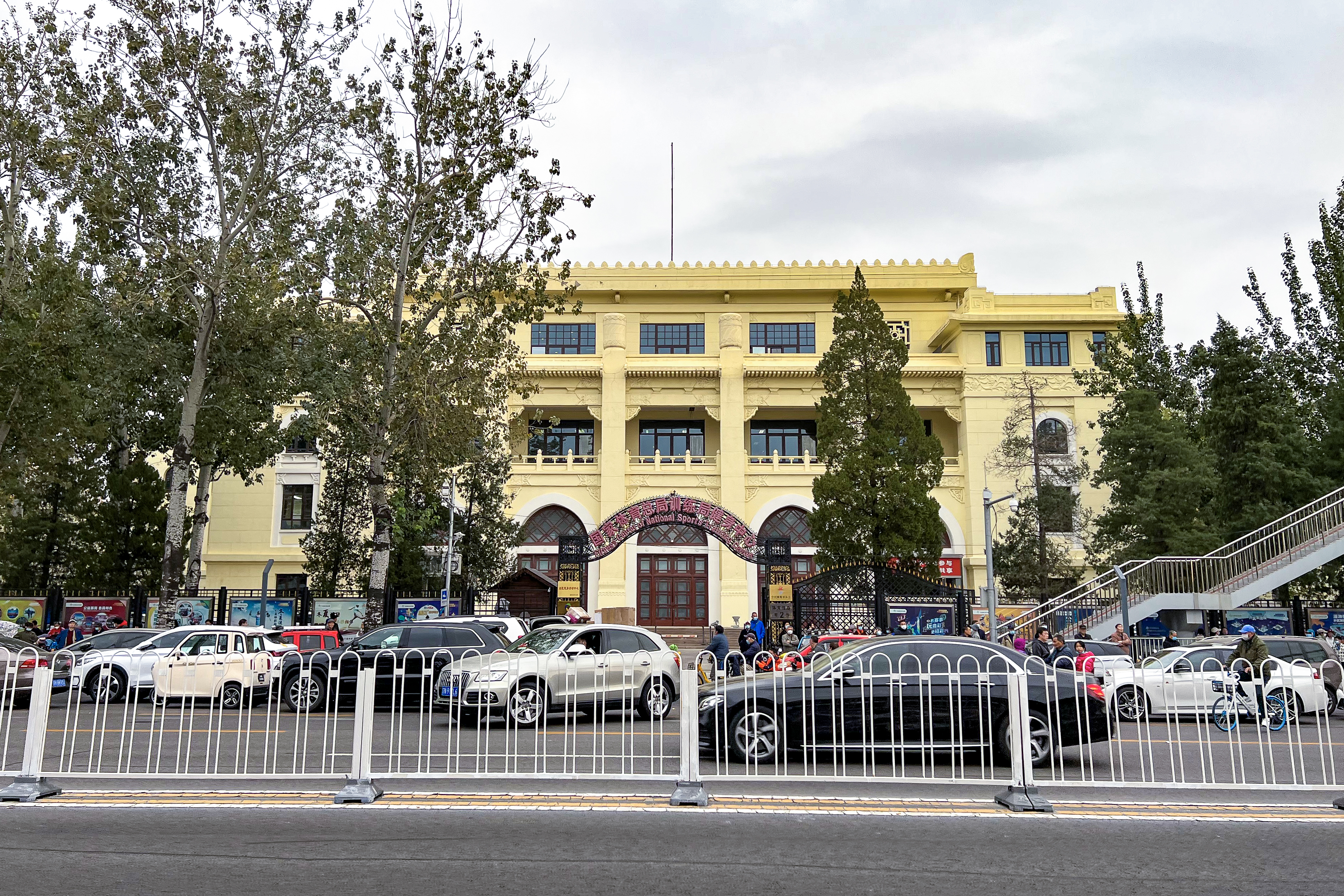
- Interactive map of Beijing Gymnasium
- Location: Dongcheng District, Beijing
- Owner: General Administration of Sport of China
- Capacity: 6,000

Construction
- Built: 1954
- Opened: 1955

Beijing Gymnasium is an indoor arena located in Dongcheng District, Beijing, which consists of a main competition hall, a practice hall, and a swimming pool. Built in 1954 with the aid of Soviet architects, it is the first multi-purpose indoor stadium built after the founding of People's Republic of China. It was the venue for badminton competition of 1990 Asian Games. It has been serving as the Fitness Center of National Sports Training Center since 2009.

== Government usage ==
Beijing Gymnasium is used for meeting foreign dignitaries before the construction of Great Hall of the People. It is reported that He Long has his office here, with a red telephone that is directly connected to Zhongnanhai.
