= Christine Magnusson =

Swedish badminton player (born 1964)

Personal information
- Full name: Christine Kajumba Gandrup
- Born: Christine Kajumba Magnusson; 21 November 1964 (age 61) Fort Portal, Tooro Kingdom, Uganda
- Height: 1.64 m (5 ft 5 in)
- Spouse: Max Gandrup

Sport
- Country: Sweden
- Sport: Badminton
- Handedness: Right

Women's doubles
- Highest ranking: 2
- BWF profile
Medal record
Women's badminton
Representing Sweden
World Championships
Silver medal – second place	1991 Copenhagen	Women's doubles
Bronze medal – third place	1989 Jakarta	Women's doubles
World Cup
Gold medal – first place	1993 New Delhi	Women's doubles
Bronze medal – third place	1986 Bandung & Jakarta	Mixed doubles
Bronze medal – third place	1992 Guangzhou	Women's doubles
Uber Cup
Bronze medal – third place	1992 Kuala Lumpur	Women's team
Bronze medal – third place	1994 Jakarta	Women's team
European Championships
Gold medal – first place	1992 Glasgow	Women's doubles
Gold medal – first place	1994 Den Bosch	Women's doubles
Bronze medal – third place	1982 Böblingen	Women's singles
Bronze medal – third place	1984 Preston	Women's doubles
Bronze medal – third place	1986 Uppsala	Women's singles
Bronze medal – third place	1986 Uppsala	Women's doubles
Bronze medal – third place	1986 Uppsala	Mixed doubles
Bronze medal – third place	1988 Kristiansand	Women's singles
Bronze medal – third place	1988 Kristiansand	Women's doubles
Bronze medal – third place	1990 Moscow	Women's singles
Bronze medal – third place	1990 Moscow	Women's doubles
Bronze medal – third place	1994 Den Bosch	Women's singles
Bronze medal – third place	1996 Herning	Women's singles
European Mixed Team Championships
Gold medal – first place	1992 Glasgow	Mixed team
Gold medal – first place	1994 Den Bosch	Mixed team
Silver medal – second place	1988 Kristiansand	Mixed team
Silver medal – second place	1990 Moscow	Mixed team
Silver medal – second place	1996 Herning	Mixed team
Bronze medal – third place	1980 Groningen	Mixed team
Bronze medal – third place	1984 Preston	Mixed team
Bronze medal – third place	1986 Uppsala	Mixed team
European Junior Championships
Silver medal – second place	1981 Edinburgh	Girls' doubles
Silver medal – second place	1983 Helsinki	Girls' singles
Silver medal – second place	1983 Helsinki	Girls' doubles
Silver medal – second place	1983 Helsinki	Mixed doubles
Bronze medal – third place	1979 Mülheim	Mixed team
Bronze medal – third place	1981 Edinburgh	Mixed team
Bronze medal – third place	1983 Helsinki	Mixed team

Christine Kajumba Gandrup (formerly Magnusson, born 21 November 1964) is a Swedish badminton player who won events in numerous Swedish National, open European and other international tournaments.

== Career ==
Magnusson's Swedish national titles included seven in women's singles between 1982 and 1990. She won the bronze medal at the 1989 IBF World Championships and a silver medal at the 1991 IBF World Championships in women's doubles with Maria Bengtsson. She also represented Sweden at the 1992 Summer Olympics and 1996 Summer Olympics. She won gold in women's doubles at the 1992 and 1994 European Badminton Championships with Lim Xiaoqing and the Badminton World Cup women's doubles with Lim in 1993.

In the Open Grand Prix Circuit Christine Magnusson won the USSR International titles in singles and doubles (with Maria Bengtsson) in 1981, the Scottish Open singles titles in 1985, 1986 and 1988. In 1987, she won the Belgian International in women's singles and the Dutch Open doubles title with Maria Bengtsson. She won more women's doubles titles again with Maria Bengtsson at the Belgian International 1988 and also at the Chinese Taipei Masters Open 1988 and the Finnish International 1990. In 1991, she won both the singles and doubles titles (with Maria Bengtsson) at the Chinese Taipei Masters Open.

She won the Scottish Open and German Open women's doubles titles in 1991 and 1992 with Lim Xiaoqing. She also won the doubles title at the Danish Open with Lim Xiaoqing in 1992 and 1994, the US Open in 1992, and both the Malaysia Open and Chinese Taipei Open in 1993.

In 1996, Magnusson won the Polish Open doubles title with Marina Andrievskaya.

== Personal life ==
Christine Magnusson was born in Uganda, as daughter of an Ugandan mother and a Swedish father. The family fled Uganda during the rule of Idi Amin and moved to Sweden in 1975 after also living in Kenya for a while, where she first came in contact with badminton. After arriving in Sweden she became a member of the Taby Badminton Club at the young age of ten years. Under the guidance of trainer Dan Andersson, she quickly improved her skills and already at a young age of 16 years she was selected by the National badminton team of Sweden. Eventually playing two Olympic Games and many international events at the top level of the sport of badminton for many decades.

Magnusson was married to fellow Danish badminton player Max Gandrup and the pair have two children; daughter Tanja born in 1997 and son Kevin born in 1999. After retirement in the sport she started working as a sales coordinator at a cosmetics company. In her free time she now plays golf.

== Achievements ==
=== World Championships ===
Women's doubles
Year	Venue	Partner	Opponent	Score	Result
1989	Istora Senayan; Jakarta, Indonesia	(Sweden) Maria Bengtsson	(China) Guan Weizhen (China) Lin Ying	2–15, 3–15	Bronze
1991	Brøndby Arena; Copenhagen, Denmark	(Sweden) Maria Bengtsson	(China) Guan Weizhen (China) Nong Qunhua	7–15, 4–15	Silver

=== World Cup ===
Women's doubles
Year	Venue	Partner	Opponent	Score	Result
1992	Guangdong Gymnasium; Guangzhou, China	(England) Gillian Clark	(China) Lin Yanfen (China) Yao Fen		Bronze
1993	Indira Gandhi Arena; New Delhi, India	(Sweden) Lim Xiaoqing	(South Korea) Chung So-young (South Korea) Gil Young-ah	15–12, 15–9	Gold

Mixed doubles
Year	Venue	Partner	Opponent	Score	Result
1986	Istora Senayan; Jakarta, Indonesia	(Sweden) Thomas Kihlström	(Denmark) Steen Fladberg (England) Gillian Clark	4–15, 15–8, 7–15	Bronze

=== European Championships ===
Women's singles
Year	Venue	Opponent	Score	Result
1982	Sporthalle, Böblingen, West Germany	(Denmark) Lene Køppen	4–11, 1–11	Bronze
1986	Fyrishallen, Uppsala, Sweden	(Denmark) Kirsten Larsen	4–11, 6–11	Bronze
1988	Badmintonsenteret, Kristiansand, Norway	(Denmark) Christina Bostofte	5–11, 2–11	Bronze
1990	Luzhniki, Moscow, Soviet Union	(England) Fiona Smith	3–11, 1–11	Bronze
1994	Maaspoort, Den Bosch, Netherlands	(Sweden) Catrine Bengtsson	11–5, 0–11, 4–11	Bronze
1996	Herning Badminton Klub, Herning, Denmark	(Denmark) Camilla Martin	6–11, 4–11	Bronze

Women's doubles
Year	Venue	Partner	Opponent	Score	Result
1984	Guild Hall; Preston, England	(Sweden) Maria Bengtsson	(England) Karen Chapman (England) Gillian Clark	Walkover	Bronze
1986	Fyrishallen; Uppsala, Sweden	(Sweden) Maria Bengtsson	(England) Gillian Clark (England) Gillian Gowers	10–15, 15–8, 11–15	Bronze
1988	Badmintonsenteret; Kristiansand, Norway	(Sweden) Maria Bengtsson	(Denmark) Dorte Kjær (Denmark) Nettie Nielsen	8–15, 9–15	Bronze
1990	Luzhniki; Moscow, Soviet Union	(Sweden) Maria Bengtsson	(Denmark) Dorte Kjær (Denmark) Nettie Nielsen	15–13, 5–15, 3–15	Bronze
1992	Kelvin Hall International Sports Arena; Glasgow, Scotland	(Sweden) Lim Xiaoqing	(Denmark) Lisbet Stuer-Lauridsen (Denmark) Marlene Thomsen	8–15, 15–11, 15–6	Gold
1994	Maaspoort; Den Bosch, Netherlands	(Sweden) Lim Xiaoqing	(Denmark) Lotte Olsen (Denmark) Lisbet Stuer-Lauridsen	17–14, 15–12	Gold

Mixed doubles
Year	Venue	Partner	Opponent	Score	Result
1986	Fyrishallen; Uppsala, Sweden	(Sweden) Thomas Kihlström	(England) Martin Dew (England) Gillian Gilks	8–15, 8–15	Bronze

=== European Junior Championships ===
Girls' singles
Year	Venue	Opponent	Score	Result
1983	Helsinkian Sports Hall, Helsinki, Finland	(England) Helen Troke	5–11, 10–12	Silver

Girls' doubles
Year	Venue	Partner	Opponent	Score	Result
1981	Meadowbank Sports Centre; Edinburgh, Scotland	(Sweden) Maria Bengtsson	(Denmark) Dorte Kjær (Denmark) Nettie Nielsen	15–18, 10–15	Silver
1983	Helsinkian Sports Hall; Helsinki, Finland	(Sweden) Jeanette Kuhl	(England) Lisa Chapman (England) Jane Shipman	6–15, 9–15	Silver

Mixed doubles
Year	Venue	Partner	Opponent	Score	Result
1983	Helsinkian Sports Hall; Helsinki, Finland	(Sweden) Stellan Österberg	(Denmark) Anders Nielsen (Denmark) Gitte Paulsen	7–15, 12–15	Silver

=== IBF World Grand Prix ===
The World Badminton Grand Prix was sanctioned by the International Badminton Federation from 1983 to 2006.

Women's singles
Year	Tournament	Opponent	Score	Result
1985	Scottish Open	(Denmark) Rikke van Sørensen	11–8, 7–11, 11–6	(gold) Winner
1986	Scottish Open	(Netherlands) Erica van Dijck	11–6, 11–4	(gold) Winner
1988	Poona Open	(England) Helen Troke	11–12, 11–4, 11–4	(gold) Winner
1988	Scottish Open	(England) Fiona Smith	11–9, 12–10	(gold) Winner
1989	Chinese Taipei Open	(Indonesia) Susi Susanti	8–11, 11–3, 11–7	(gold) Winner
1989	Dutch Open	(Netherlands) Eline Coene	11–12, 4–11	(silver) Runner-up
1990	Finnish Open	(Denmark) Pernille Nedergaard	10–12, 0–11	(silver) Runner-up
1991	Scottish Open	(Sweden) Lim Xiaoqing	0–11, 3–11	(silver) Runner-up
1992	Chinese Taipei Masters	(Indonesia) Yuliani Santosa	6–11, 12–8, 9–11	(silver) Runner-up
1992	U.S. Open	(Sweden) Lim Xiaoqing	2–11, 2–11	(silver) Runner-up
1992	Scottish Open	(Sweden) Lim Xiaoqing	9–11, 2–11	(silver) Runner-up
1993	U.S. Open	(Sweden) Lim Xiaoqing	5–11, 0–11	(silver) Runner-up

Women's doubles
Year	Tournament	Partner	Opponent	Score	Result
1984	Malaysia Open	(England) Gillian Clark	(China) Guan Weizhen (China) Wu Jianqiu	10–15, 13–15	(silver) Runner-up
1985	Scandinavian Open	(Sweden) Maria Bengtsson	(South Korea) Kim Yun-ja (South Korea) Yoo Sang-hee	15–8, 5–15, 1–15	(silver) Runner-up
1985	Scottish Open	(Sweden) Maria Bengtsson	(Denmark) Dorte Kjær (Denmark) Nettie Nielsen	13–15, 8–15	(silver) Runner-up
1986	Scottish Open	(Sweden) Maria Bengtsson	(Denmark) Dorte Kjær (Denmark) Nettie Nielsen	8–15, 11–15	(silver) Runner-up
1986	English Masters	(Sweden) Maria Bengtsson	(England) Gillian Clark (England) Gillian Gowers	15–5, 15–11	(gold) Winner
1987	Chinese Taipei Open	(Sweden) Maria Bengtsson	(South Korea) Chung Myung-hee (South Korea) Hwang Hye-young	17–14, 9–15, 4–15	(silver) Runner-up
1987	Dutch Open	(Sweden) Maria Bengtsson	(England) Gillian Clark (England) Sara Halsall	15–10, 15–4	(gold) Winner
1988	Chinese Taipei Open	(Sweden) Maria Bengtsson	(England) Gillian Clark (England) Gillian Gowers	6–15, 15–6, 15–6	(gold) Winner
1989	Chinese Taipei Open	(Sweden) Maria Bengtsson	(Denmark) Dorte Kjær (Denmark) Lotte Olsen	15–13, 9–15, 15–6	(gold) Winner
1989	Poona Open	(Sweden) Maria Bengtsson	(England) Gillian Clark (England) Sara Sankey	15–4, 13–15, 15–4	(gold) Winner
1990	Finnish Open	(Sweden) Maria Bengtsson	(England) Gillian Clark (England) Gillian Gowers	15–12, 15–12	(gold) Winner
1990	Singapore Open	(Sweden) Maria Bengtsson	(England) Gillian Clark (England) Gillian Gowers	12–15, 13–15	(silver) Runner-up
1990	Dutch Open	(Sweden) Maria Bengtsson	(Denmark) Nettie Nielsen (Denmark) Lisbet Stuer-Lauridsen	9–15, 11–15	(silver) Runner-up
1991	Singapore Open	(Sweden) Lim Xiaoqing	(South Korea) Chung Myung-hee (South Korea) Chung So-young	11–15, 3–15	(silver) Runner-up
1991	German Open	(Sweden) Lim Xiaoqing	(China) Lin Yanfen (China) Yao Fen	15–11, 17–15	(gold) Winner
1991	Scottish Open	(Sweden) Lim Xiaoqing	(England) Joanne Muggeridge (Denmark) Lisbet Stuer-Lauridsen	11–0, 11–5	(gold) Winner
1992	Malaysia Open	(Sweden) Lim Xiaoqing	(South Korea) Gil Young-ah (South Korea) Park Soo-yun	15–7, 15–9	(gold) Winner
1992	U.S. Open	(Sweden) Lim Xiaoqing	(Japan) Kimiko Jinnai (Japan) Hisako Mori	15–4, 15–9	(gold) Winner
1992	German Open	(Sweden) Lim Xiaoqing	(Sweden) Catrine Bengtsson (Sweden) Maria Bengtsson	15–9, 15–0	(gold) Winner
1992	Denmark Open	(Sweden) Lim Xiaoqing	(Sweden) Catrine Bengtsson (Sweden) Maria Bengtsson	15–7, 15–3	(gold) Winner
1992	Scottish Open	(Sweden) Lim Xiaoqing	(Sweden) Catrine Bengtsson (Sweden) Maria Bengtsson	15–6, 15–6	(gold) Winner
1993	Chinese Taipei Open	(Sweden) Lim Xiaoqing	(Japan) Tomomi Matsuo (Japan) Kyoko Sasage	18–15, 18–13	(gold) Winner
1993	Swedish Open	(Sweden) Lim Xiaoqing	(South Korea) Chung So-young (South Korea) Gil Young-ah	9–15, 11–15	(silver) Runner-up
1993	Malaysia Open	(Sweden) Lim Xiaoqing	(Denmark) Lotte Olsen (Denmark) Lisbet Stuer-Lauridsen	15–12, 18–14	(gold) Winner
1993	U.S. Open	(Sweden) Lim Xiaoqing	(South Korea) Chung So-young (South Korea) Gil Young-ah	5–15, 4–15	(silver) Runner-up
1993	Canadian Open	(Sweden) Lim Xiaoqing	(Denmark) Lotte Olsen (Denmark) Lisbet Stuer-Lauridsen	15–11, 15–5	(gold) Winner
1994	Denmark Open	(Sweden) Lim Xiaoqing	(Denmark) Marlene Thomsen (Denmark) Anne-Mette van Dijk	15–12, 7–15, 15–2	(gold) Winner
1996	Polish Open	(Sweden) Marina Andrievskaya	(Wales) Kelly Morgan (England) Joanne Muggeridge	15–10, 15–8	(gold) Winner
1996	Dutch Open	(Sweden) Margit Borg	(Netherlands) Eline Coene (Netherlands) Erica van den Heuvel	5–9, 1–9, 9–5, 2–9	(silver) Runner-up
1996	Russian Open	(Sweden) Marina Andrievskaya	(Denmark) Helene Kirkegaard (Denmark) Rikke Olsen	12–15, 15–10, 5–15	(silver) Runner-up

Mixed doubles
Year	Tournament	Partner	Opponent	Score	Result
1986	World Grand Prix Finals	(Sweden) Thomas Kihlström	(England) Nigel Tier (England) Gillian Gowers	15–8, 4–15, 8–15	(silver) Runner-up
1987	All England Open	(Sweden) Jan-Eric Antonsson	(South Korea) Lee Deuk-choon (South Korea) Chung Myung-hee	5–15, 18–14, 8–15	(silver) Runner-up

=== IBF International ===
Women's singles
Year	Tournament	Opponent	Score	Result
1981	USSR International	(Soviet Union) Svetlana Belyasova	7–11, 11–7, 11–6	(gold) Winner
1984	Victor Cup	(Netherlands) Eline Coene	5–11, 11–0, 3–11	(silver) Runner-up
1983	Nordic Championships	(Denmark) Kirsten Larsen	8–11, 11–4, 5–11	(silver) Runner-up
1984	Nordic Championships	(Denmark) Kirsten Larsen	0–11, 3–11	(silver) Runner-up
1985	Nordic Championships	(Denmark) Rikke van Sørensen	11–9, 11–4	(gold) Winner
1986	Nordic Championships	(Denmark) Kirsten Larsen	10–12, 11–5, 4–11	(silver) Runner-up
1992	Nordic Championships	(Denmark) Pernille Nedergaard	7–11, 12–9, 11–1	(gold) Winner

Women's doubles
Year	Tournament	Partner	Opponent	Score	Result
1981	USSR International	(Sweden) Maria Bengtsson	(Sweden) Alla Prodan (Sweden) Irina Melnikova	15–10, 15–6	(gold) Winner
1982	Nordic Championships	(Sweden) Maria Bengtsson	(Denmark) Dorte Kjær (Denmark) Nettie Nielsen	5–15, 9–15	(silver) Runner-up
1983	Northumberland Championships	(Sweden) Maria Bengtsson	(Denmark) Dorte Kjær (Denmark) Nettie Nielsen	12–15, 10–15	(silver) Runner-up
1983	Nordic Championships	(Sweden) Maria Bengtsson	(Sweden) Carina Andersson (Sweden) Lilian Johansson	15–3, 18–13	(gold) Winner
1984	Nordic Championships	(Sweden) Maria Bengtsson	(Denmark) Dorte Kjær (Denmark) Kirsten Larsen	7–15, 17–14, 10–15	(silver) Runner-up
1985	Nordic Championships	(Sweden) Maria Bengtsson	(Denmark) Dorte Kjær (Denmark) Nettie Nielsen	4–15, 18–16, 13–15	(silver) Runner-up
1986	Nordic Championships	(Sweden) Maria Bengtsson	(Denmark) Dorte Kjær (Denmark) Nettie Nielsen	8–15, 11–15	(silver) Runner-up
1987	Nordic Championships	(Sweden) Maria Bengtsson	(Denmark) Dorte Kjær (Denmark) Nettie Nielsen	15–11, 4–15, 4–15	(silver) Runner-up
1992	Nordic Championships	(Sweden) Lim Xiaoqing	(Denmark) Lotte Olsen (Denmark) Marlene Thomsen	15–6, 15–13	(gold) Winner

Mixed doubles

Year	Tournament	Partner	Opponent	Score	Result
1985	Malaysia Master	(Sweden) Thomas Kihlström	(Denmark) Steen Fladberg (England) Nora Perry	9–15, 5–15	(silver) Runner-up
1985	Malaysia Master	(Sweden) Thomas Kihlström	(England) Martin Dew (England) Gillian Gilks	17–15, 15–12	(silver) Runner-up
1985	Malaysia Master	(Sweden) Thomas Kihlström	(Sweden) Stefan Karlsson (Sweden) Maria Bengtsson	15–10, 9–15, 10–15	(silver) Runner-up
1985	Nordic Championships	(Sweden) Thomas Kihlström	(Sweden) Stefan Karlsson (Sweden) Maria Bengtsson	9–15, 7–15	(silver) Runner-up
