= Jesper Helledie =

Danish badminton player (born 1954)

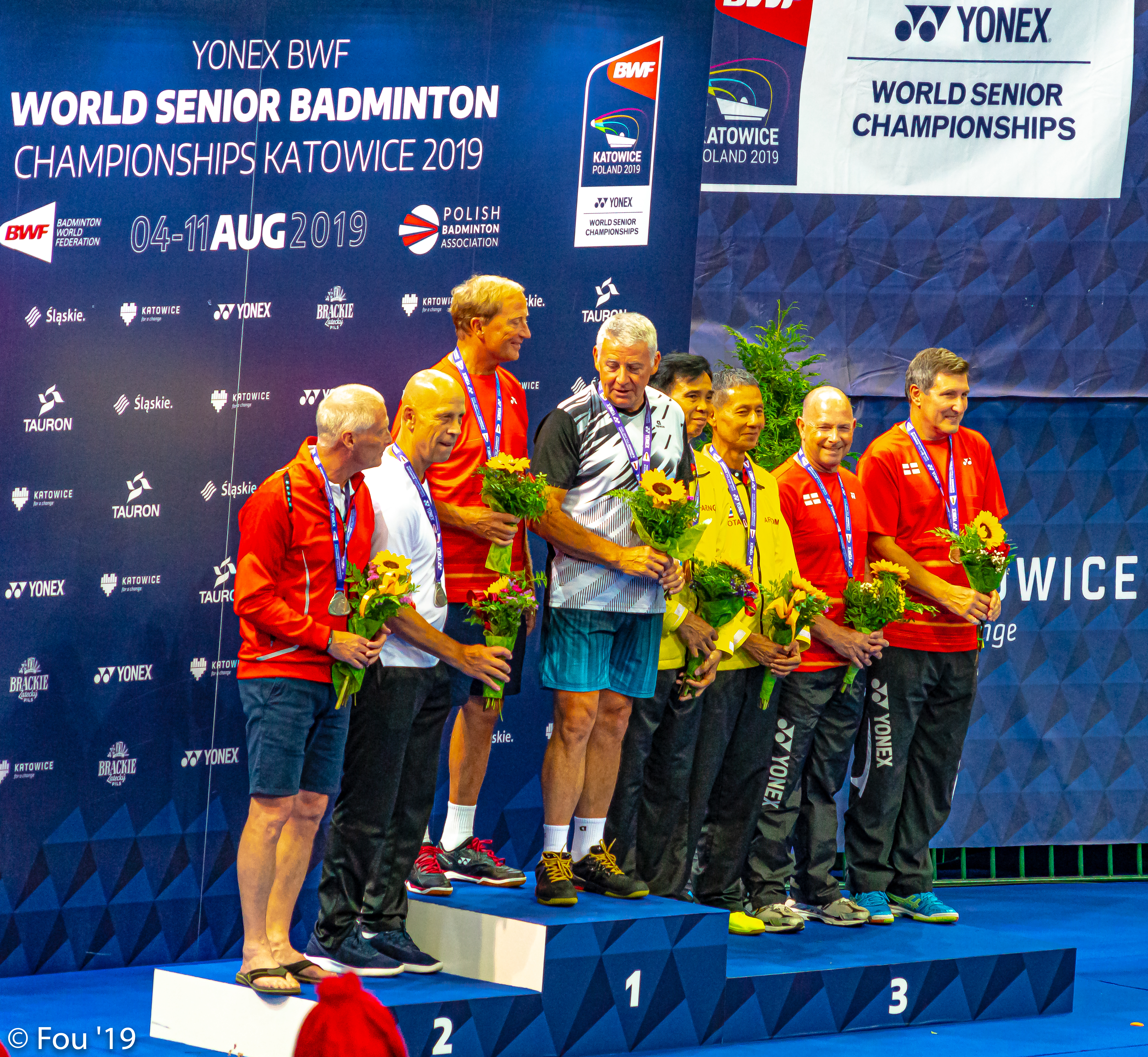

Personal information
- Born: 5 September 1954 (age 72)

Sport
- Country: Denmark
- Sport: Badminton
Medal record
Men's badminton
Representing Denmark
World Championships
Gold medal – first place	1983 Copenhagen	Men's doubles
World Cup
Bronze medal – third place	1983 Kuala Lumpur	Mixed doubles
Bronze medal – third place	1985 Jakarta	Mixed doubles
World Senior Championships
Gold medal – first place	2009 Huelva	Men's doubles 50+
Gold medal – first place	2009 Huelva	Mixed doubles 50+
Gold medal – first place	2019 Katowice	Men's doubles 60+
Silver medal – second place	2021 Huelva	Men's singles 65+
Silver medal – second place	2025 Pattaya	Men's singles 70+
Bronze medal – third place	2015 Helsingborg	Mixed doubles 55+
Bronze medal – third place	2015 Helsingborg	Men's doubles 60+
Bronze medal – third place	2021 Huelva	Men's doubles 60+
Thomas Cup
Bronze medal – third place	1982 London	Men's team
European Championships
Gold medal – first place	1986 Uppsala	Men's doubles
European Mixed Team Championships
Gold medal – first place	1986 Uppsala	Mixed team
Bronze medal – third place	1982 Böblingen	Mixed team
European Junior Championships
Gold medal – first place	1973 Edinburgh	Boys' singles
Gold medal – first place	1973 Edinburgh	Mixed doubles
Gold medal – first place	1973 Edinburgh	Mixed team
Silver medal – second place	1973 Edinburgh	Boys' doubles

Jesper Helledie (born 5 September 1954) is a Danish badminton player. Though a highly regarded prospect in men's singles as a young player, he eventually became a doubles specialist. Helledie was the men's doubles gold medalists at the 1983 World Championships. He has played 46 international matches for Denmark from 1974 to 1986. He overcoming two ruptures of his achilles tendon during his career.

== Career ==
Helledie is a Farum origin (now parts of Furesø Municipality), started his badminton journey in Hvidovre badminton club trained by Søren Ewald. He has shown his talent in his youth winning the 1973 European Junior Championships in the boys' singles. During his career, he has spent most of his career in Hvidovre badminton club, except for 7 years when he lived in Calgary, Canada. He received Honorary Member of Hvidovre Badminton Club in 2000.

Helledie won the gold medal at the 1983 IBF World Championships in the men's doubles with Steen Fladberg, defeating Mike Tredgett and Martin Dew 15–10, 15–10 in the final.

He also won at the 1986 European Championships in the men's doubles with the same partner.

== Achievements ==
=== World Championships ===
Men's doubles
Year	Venue	Partner	Opponent	Score	Result
1983	Brøndbyhallen, Copenhagen, Denmark	(Denmark) Steen Fladberg	(England) Martin Dew (England) Mike Tredgett	15–10, 15–10	Gold

=== World Cup ===
Mixed doubles
Year	Venue	Partner	Opponent	Score	Result
1983	Stadium Negara, Kuala Lumpur, Malaysia	(England) Sally Podger	(England) Martin Dew (England) Gillian Gilks	9–15, 7–15	Bronze
1985	Istora Senayan, Jakarta, Indonesia	(China) Lin Ying	(Indonesia) Christian Hadinata (Indonesia) Ivana Lie	16–17, 15–12, 1–15	Bronze

=== World Senior Championships ===
Men's singles
Year	Age	Venue	Opponent	Score	Result	Ref.
2021	65+	Palacio de los Deportes Carolina Marín; Huelva, Spain	(Denmark) Karsten Meier	15–21, 21–14, 16–21	Silver	
2025	70+	Eastern National Sports Training Centre; Pattaya, Thailand	(Malaysia) Bruni Garip	17–21, 20–22	Silver	

Men's doubles
Year	Age	Venue	Partner	Opponent	Score	Result	Ref.
2009	50+	Pabellón Municipal de Deportes; Huelva, Spain	(Denmark) Steen Fladberg	(Thailand) Surapong Suharitdumrong (Thailand) Taveesup Waranusast	21–13, 20–22, 21–16	Gold	
2015	60+	Helsingborg Arena; Helsingborg, Sweden	(Denmark) Claus B. Andersen	(Thailand) Jiamsak Panitchaikul (Thailand) Surapong Suharitdumrong	21–18, 8–21, 13–21	Bronze	
2019	60+	Spodek; Katowice, Poland	(Scotland) Dan Travers	(Denmark) Per Juul (Denmark) Birger Steenberg	21–12, 21–18	Gold	
2021	60+	Palacio de los Deportes Carolina Marín; Huelva, Spain	(Scotland) Dan Travers	(Canada) Jack Keith Priestman (United States) Geoffrey Stensland	15–21, 18–21	Bronze	

Mixed doubles
Year	Age	Venue	Partner	Opponent	Score	Result	Ref.
2009	50+	Pabellón Municipal de Deportes; Huelva, Spain	(Israel) Svetlana Zilberman	(Scotland) Dan Travers (Scotland) Christine Black	19–21, 21–16, 21–18	Gold	
2015	55+	Helsingborg Arena; Helsingborg, Sweden	(Denmark) Hanne Adsbøl	(Germany) Stefan Frey (Germany) Heidi Bender	21–17, 12–21, 18–21	Bronze	

=== European Championships ===
Men's doubles
Year	Venue	Partner	Opponent	Score	Result
1986	Fyrishallen, Uppsala, Sweden	(Denmark) Steen Fladberg	(Sweden) Stefan Karlsson (Sweden) Thomas Kihlström	15–12, 18–17	Gold

=== European Junior Championships ===
Boys' singles
Year	Venue	Opponent	Score	Result
1973	Edinburgh, Scotland	(Norway) Petter Thoresen	15–1, 15–7	Gold

Boys' doubles
Year	Venue	Partner	Opponent	Score	Result
1973	Edinburgh, Scotland	(Denmark) Jacob Dynnes Hansen	(Sweden) Stefan Karlsson (Sweden) Willy Nilsson	9–15, 12–15	Silver

Mixed doubles
Year	Venue	Partner	Opponent	Score	Result
1973	Edinburgh, Scotland	(Denmark) Susanne Johansen	(Denmark) Hans Olaf Birkholm (Denmark) Mette Myhre	15–8, 15–10	Gold

=== IBF World Grand Prix ===
The World Badminton Grand Prix sanctioned by International Badminton Federation (IBF) from 1983 to 2006.

Men's doubles
Year	Tournament	Partner	Opponent	Score	Result
1983	Swedish Open	(Denmark) Steen Fladberg	(Sweden) Stefan Karlsson (Sweden) Thomas Kihlström	4–15, 18–13, 15–10	(gold) Winner
1984	Chinese Taipei Open	(Denmark) Steen Fladberg	(Sweden) Stefan Karlsson (Sweden) Thomas Kihlström	3–15, 6–15	(silver) Runner-up
1984	Scottish Open	(Denmark) Morten Frost	(England) Duncan Bridge (England) Nigel Tier	15–11, 15–11	(gold) Winner
1985	Hong Kong Open	(Denmark) Steen Fladberg	(Denmark) Mark Christiansen (Denmark) Michael Kjeldsen	15–8, 7–15, 15–12	(gold) Winner
1985	Dutch Open	(Denmark) Steen Fladberg	(Denmark) Mark Christiansen (Denmark) Michael Kjeldsen	15–8, 15–9	(gold) Winner
1985	Scandinavian Open	(Denmark) Steen Fladberg	(England) Martin Dew (England) Dipak Tailor	15–12, 15–9	(gold) Winner
1986	German Open	(Denmark) Steen Fladberg	(South Korea) Kim Moon-soo (South Korea) Park Joo-bong	8–15, 12–15	(silver) Runner-up
1986	Scandinavian Open	(Denmark) Steen Fladberg	(England) Martin Dew (England) Dipak Tailor	15–9, 15–18, 15–7	(gold) Winner
1986	Carlton-Intersport Cup	(Denmark) Steen Fladberg	(England) Martin Dew (England) Dipak Tailor	9–15, 14–18	(silver) Runner-up

Mixed doubles
Year	Tournament	Partner	Opponent	Score	Result
1985	Dutch Open	(Denmark) Dorte Kjær	(Denmark) Steen Fladberg (Denmark) Gitte Paulsen	9–15, 11–15	(silver) Runner-up
1985	Canadian Open	(Canada) Johanne Falardeau	(Scotland) Billy Gilliland (England) Nora Perry	6–15, 9–15	(silver) Runner-up
1985	Chinese Taipei Open	(Netherlands) Erica van Dijck	(Scotland) Billy Gilliland (England) Nora Perry	6–15, 9–15	(silver) Runner-up

=== IBF International ===
Men's doubles
Year	Tournament	Partner	Opponent	Score	Result
1975	Swedish Open	(Denmark) Jørgen Mortensen	(England) Ray Stevens (England) Mike Tredgett	6–15, 15–13, 6–15	(silver) Runner-up
1976	Swedish Open	(Denmark) Jørgen Mortensen	(Denmark) Flemming Delfs (Denmark) Elo Hansen	0–15, 2–15	(silver) Runner-up
1978	Dutch Open	(Denmark) Svend Pri	(England) Ray Stevens (England) Mike Tredgett	9–15, 15–1, 15–5	(gold) Winner
1978	Norwegian International	(Denmark) Steen Fladberg	(Denmark) Kenneth Larsen (Denmark) Mogens Neergaard	15–5, 15–8	(gold) Winner
1982	Scandinavian Open	(Denmark) Steen Skovgaard	(Sweden) Stefan Karlsson (Sweden) Thomas Kihlström	13–15, 15–13, 10–15	(silver) Runner-up
1982	Nordic Championships	(Denmark) Steen Skovgaard	(Denmark) Steen Fladberg (Denmark) Morten Frost	6–15, 18–15, 6–15	(silver) Runner-up
1983	Dutch Open	(Denmark) Steen Fladberg	(England) Martin Dew (England) Mike Tredgett	18–13, 15–10	(gold) Winner
1983	India Masters	(Denmark) Jens Peter Nierhoff	(England) Steve Baddeley (England) Martin Dew	7–15, 15–6, 15–14	(gold) Winner
1985	U.S. Open	(Canada) John Goss	(United States) John Britton (United States) Gary Higgins	12–15, 11–15	(silver) Runner-up

Mixed doubles
Year	Tournament	Partner	Opponent	Score	Result
1984	Nordic Championships	(Denmark) Dorte Kjær	(Denmark) Kenneth Larsen (Denmark) Gitte Paulsen	15–10, 15–9	(gold) Winner
1985	U.S. Open	(Canada) Nancy Little	(Canada) Mike Butler (Canada) Claire Backhouse-Sharpe	9–15, 15–7, 4–15	(silver) Runner-up
