= Dorte Kjær =

Danish badminton player (born 1964)

Personal information
- Born: 6 February 1964 (age 62) Roskilde, Sjælland, Denmark

Sport
- Country: Denmark
- Sport: Badminton
- Handedness: Right
- BWF profile
Medal record
Women's badminton
Representing Denmark
World Cup
Bronze medal – third place	1988 Bangkok	Women's doubles
Sudirman Cup
Bronze medal – third place	1989 Jakarta	Mixed team
Bronze medal – third place	1991 Copenhagen	Mixed team
European Championships
Gold medal – first place	1988 Kristiansand	Women's doubles
Gold medal – first place	1980 Groningen	Mixed team
Gold medal – first place	1986 Uppsala	Mixed team
Gold medal – first place	1988 Kristiansand	Mixed team
Gold medal – first place	1990 Moscow	Women's doubles
Gold medal – first place	1990 Moscow	Mixed team
Silver medal – second place	1986 Uppsala	Women's doubles
Silver medal – second place	1984 Preston	Mixed team
Bronze medal – third place	1980 Groningen	Women's doubles
Bronze medal – third place	1982 Böblingen	Women's doubles
Bronze medal – third place	1984 Preston	Women's doubles
Bronze medal – third place	1982 Böblingen	Mixed team
European Junior Championships
Gold medal – first place	1981 Edinburgh	Girls' doubles
Gold medal – first place	1981 Edinburgh	Mixed team

Dorte Kjær (born 6 February 1964) is a retired female badminton player from Denmark.

== European & Danish titles ==
Kjær won the gold medal at the 1988 and 1990 European Badminton Championships in women's doubles with Nettie Nielsen. She and Nettie Nielsen had already won the European juniors girls doubles title in 1981. In 1983 they became the Danish National ladies doubles champions for the first time. Together they won the Danish National Badminton Championships six times (1983, 1985, 1986, 1987, 1988 & 1990). Dorte Kjaer won another National ladies doubles title in 1991 with Lotte Olsen. She also won one National Danish mixed doubles title in 1990 with Henrik Svarrer. Dorte Kjaer first won a bronze medal at the 1980 European Badminton Championships with Anne Skovgaard. She won a silver medal in the mixed doubles at the 1981 European Junior Championships with Mark Christiansen in Edinburgh, Scotland.

== Other International titles ==
Dorte Kjaer and Nettie Nielsen won a bronze medal in Women's doubles at the 1988 Summer Olympics in Seoul when badminton was an exhibition sport. Dorte Kjaer won the Nordic badminton Championships in Women's doubles in 1982, 1984, 1985, 1986, 1987 and 1988 with Nettie Nielsen and in 1989 with Lotte Olsen. She captured the Nordic mixed doubles title in 1984 with Jesper Helledie. With Nettie Nielsen she won the Scottish Open twice in 1985 & 1986 and with Lotte Olsen the Danish Open & German Open in 1990. With Henrik Svarrer she won the Carlton-Intersport-Cup in 1987 and the Chinese Taipei Open in 1989. She was a professional badminton player for approximately 10 years.

== Achievements ==
=== World Cup ===
Women's doubles
Year	Venue	Partner	Opponent	Score	Result
1988	National Stadium, Bangkok, Thailand	(Denmark) Nettie Nielsen	(China) Lin Ying (China) Guan Weizhen	15–12, 1–15, 5–15	Bronze

=== European Championships ===
Women's doubles
Year	Venue	Partner	Opponent	Score	Result
1980	Martinihal, Groningen, Netherlands	(Denmark) Anne Skovgaard	(England) Jane Webster (England) Nora Perry	4–15, 6–15	Bronze
1982	Sporthalle, Böblingen, West Germany	(Denmark) Nettie Nielsen	(England) Jane Webster (England) Nora Perry	9–15, 17–14, 11–15	Bronze
1984	Guild Hall, Preston, England	(Denmark) Kirsten Larsen	(England) Karen Beckman (England) Gillian Gilks	11–15, 9–15	Bronze
1986	Fyrishallen, Uppsala, Sweden	(Denmark) Nettie Nielsen	(England) Gillian Clark (England) Gillian Gowers	11–15, 12–15	Silver
1988	Badmintonsenteret, Kristiansand, Norway	(Denmark) Nettie Nielsen	(England) Gillian Clark (England) Julie Munday	15–7, 15–4	Gold
1990	Luzhniki Small Sports Arena, Moscow, Soviet Union	(Denmark) Nettie Nielsen	(Netherlands) Eline Coene (Netherlands) Erica Van Dijck	15–5, 15–6	Gold

=== European Junior Championships ===
Girls' doubles
Year	Venue	Partner	Opponent	Score	Result
1981	Meadowbank Sports Centre, Edinburgh, Scotland	(Denmark) Nettie Nielsen	(Sweden) Christine Magnusson (Sweden) Maria Bengtsson	18–15, 15–10	Gold

=== IBF World Grand Prix ===
The World Badminton Grand Prix sanctioned by International Badminton Federation (IBF) since 1983.

Women's doubles
Year	Tournament	Partner	Opponent	Score	Result
1984	Dutch Open	(Denmark) Kirsten Larsen	(England) Gillian Gilks (England) Karen Beckman	12–15, 10–15	(silver) Runner-up
1985	Scottish Open	(Denmark) Nettie Nielsen	(Sweden) Maria Bengtsson (Sweden) Christine Magnussen	15–13, 15–8	(gold) Winner
1986	Scottish Open	(Denmark) Nettie Nielsen	(England) Gillian Clark (England) Gillian Gowers	15–8, 15–11	(gold) Winner
1986	Carlton-Intersport-Cup (Schwäbisch Gmünd, Germany)	(Denmark) Nettie Nielsen	(England) Gillian Clark (England) Gillian Gowers	9–15, 11–15	(silver) Runner-up
1987	English Masters	(Denmark) Nettie Nielsen	(England) Gillian Clark (England) Gillian Gowers	15–8, 15–12	(gold) Winner
1987	Malaysia Open	(Denmark) Nettie Nielsen	(China) Lin Ying (China) Guan Weizhen	2–15, 1–15	(silver) Runner-up
1988	Poona Open	(Denmark) Nettie Nielsen	(South Korea) Yoo Sang-hee (South Korea) Kim Yun-ja	12–15, 2–15	(silver) Runner-up
1988	Dutch Open	(Denmark) Nettie Nielsen	(England) Gillian Clark (England) Sara Sankey	15–9, 9–15, 6–15	(silver) Runner-up
1988	Denmark Open	(Denmark) Nettie Nielsen	(China) Lin Ying (China) Guan Weizhen	3–15, 12–15	(silver) Runner-up
1988	Scottish Open	(Denmark) Gitte Paulsen	(England) Gillian Clark (England) Sara Sankey	Walkover	(silver) Runner-up
1989	Chinese Taipei Open	(Denmark) Lotte Olsen	(Sweden) Maria Bengtsson (Sweden) Christine Magnussen	13–15, 15–9, 6–15	(silver) Runner-up
1989	World Grand Prix Finals	(Denmark) Nettie Nielsen	(Indonesia) Erma Sulistianingsih (Indonesia) Rosiana Tendean	15–11, 16–18, 16–18	(silver) Runner-up
1990	Denmark Open	(Denmark) Lotte Olsen	(England) Gillian Clark (England) Gillian Gowers	15–13, 9–15, 15–11	(gold) Winner
1990	German Open	(Denmark) Lotte Olsen	(Denmark) Pernille Dupont (Denmark) Grete Mogensen	10–15, 15–2, 15–9	(gold) Winner

Mixed doubles
Year	Tournament	Partner	Opponent	Score	Result
1985	Dutch Open	(Denmark) Jesper Helledie	(Denmark) Steen Fladberg (Denmark) Gitte Paulsen	9–15, 11–15	(silver) Runner-up
1987	Thailand Open	(Denmark) Henrik Svarrer	(Denmark) Peter Buch (Denmark) Grete Mogensen	9–15, 11–15	(silver) Runner-up
1987	Carlton-Intersport-Cup (Schwäbisch Gmünd, Germany)	(Denmark) Henrik Svarrer	(England) Andy Goode (England) Fiona Elliott	16–17, 15–9, 15–10	(gold) Winner
1988	Poona Open	(Denmark) Nils Skeby	(Denmark) Steen Fladberg (England) Gillian Clark	8–15, 6–15	(silver) Runner-up
1988	Dutch Open	(Denmark) Henrik Svarrer	(Denmark) Jesper Knudsen (Denmark) Nettie Nielsen	7–15, 11–15	(silver) Runner-up
1989	Chinese Taipei Open	(Denmark) Henrik Svarrer	(Denmark) Jan Paulsen (England) Gillian Gowers	15–8, 15–6	(gold) Winner

=== IBF International ===
Women's singles
Year	Tournament	Opponent	Score	Result
1982	Norwegian International	(Denmark) Sussane Ejlersen	11–0, 11–3	(gold) Winner
1984	Scottish Open (II)	(Denmark) Kirsten Larsen	5–11, 4–11	(silver) Runner-up

Women's doubles
Year	Tournament	Partner	Opponent	Score	Result
1981	Nordic Championships	(Denmark) Nettie Nielsen	(Denmark) Lene Køppen (Denmark) Pia Nielsen	13–15, 14–17	(silver) Runner-up
1982	Dutch Open	(Denmark) Nettie Nielsen	(England) Gillian Gilks (England) Gillian Clark	18–16, 9–15, 12–15	(silver) Runner-up
1982	Nordic Championships	(Denmark) Nettie Nielsen	(Sweden) Maria Bengtsson (Sweden) Christine Magnusson	15–5, 15–9	(gold) Winner
1982	Norwegian International	(Denmark) Jane Pedersen	(Denmark) Sussane Ejlersen (Denmark) Charlotte Pilgaard	15–12, 6–15, 15–3	(gold) Winner
1984	Nordic Championships	(Denmark) Nettie Nielsen	(Sweden) Maria Bengtsson (Sweden) Christine Magnusson	15–7, 14–17, 15–10	(gold) Winner
1985	Nordic Championships	(Denmark) Nettie Nielsen	(Sweden) Maria Bengtsson (Sweden) Christine Magnusson	15–4, 16–18, 15–13	(gold) Winner
1986	Nordic Championships	(Denmark) Nettie Nielsen	(Sweden) Maria Bengtsson (Sweden) Christine Magnusson	15–8, 15–11	(gold) Winner
1987	Nordic Championships	(Denmark) Nettie Nielsen	(Sweden) Maria Bengtsson (Sweden) Christine Magnusson	11–15, 15–4, 15–4	(gold) Winner
1988	Nordic Championships	(Denmark) Nettie Nielsen	(Sweden) Maria Bengtsson (Sweden) Catrine Bengtsson	14–18, 15–4, 15–8	(gold) Winner
1989	Stockholm International	(Denmark) Lotte Olsen	(Soviet Union) Elena Rybkina (Soviet Union) Vlada Tcherniavskaia	4–15, 15–6, 15–3	(gold) Winner
1990	Nordic Championships	(Denmark) Lotte Olsen	(Denmark) Nettie Nielsen (Denmark) Lisbet Stuer-Lauridsen	15–8, 15–7	(gold) Winner

Mixed doubles
Year	Tournament	Partner	Opponent	Score	Result
1980	Norwegian International	(Denmark) Kenneth Larsen	(Denmark) Niels Nørgaard (Denmark) Susanne Mølgaard Hansen	15–6, 17–15	(gold) Winner
1982	Dutch Open	(Denmark) Steen Skovgaard	(England) Martin Dew (England) Gillian Gilks	14–17, 17–14, 15–8	(silver) Runner-up
1982	Norwegian International	(Denmark) Mogens Nielsen	(Denmark) Mark Christiansen (Denmark) Jane Pedersen	10–15, 10–15	(silver) Runner-up
1984	Nordic Championships	(Denmark) Jesper Helledie	(Denmark) Kenneth Larsen (Denmark) Gitte Paulsen	15–10, 15–9	(gold) Winner
1989	Stockholm International	(Denmark) Jon Holst-Christensen	(Soviet Union) Andrey Antropov (Soviet Union) Elena Rybkina	15–7, 10–15, 6–15	(silver) Runner-up
