= Anne Statt =

English-Danish badminton player (1955–2024)

Anne Skovgaard
Personal information
- Full name: Anne Statt
- Born: Anne Forest; 1955 England
- Died: 31 October 2024 (aged 68–69) Holte, Denmark

Sport
- Country: England (1973–1978); Denmark (1979–1984)
- Sport: Badminton
Medal record
Women's badminton
Representing England
Commonwealth Games
Gold medal – first place	1978 Edmonton	Mixed team
Gold medal – first place	1978 Edmonton	Women's doubles
European Championships
Gold medal – first place	1978 Preston	Women's doubles
Gold medal – first place	1978 Preston	Mixed team
European Junior Championships
Gold medal – first place	1973 Edinburgh	Girls' doubles
Representing Denmark
European Championships
Gold medal – first place	1980 Groningen	Mixed team
Bronze medal – third place	1980 Groningen	Women's doubles
Bronze medal – third place	1982 Böblingen	Women's doubles
Bronze medal – third place	1982 Böblingen	Mixed doubles
Bronze medal – third place	1982 Böblingen	Mixed team

Anne Statt (married Anne Skovgaard) was a badminton player from England, who later represented Denmark.

== Career ==
Statt won the gold medal at the 1978 European Championships in the women's doubles with Nora Perry.

Statt represented England and won double gold in the team event and women's doubles, at the 1978 Commonwealth Games in Edmonton, Alberta, Canada.

Statt married to Steen Skovgaard and later changed her family name and switched nationality to represent Denmark. She won the team event at 1980 European Badminton Championships in team event, winning 2 out of 3 matches in group 1. Skovgaard also managed to win German Open with her husband.

== Post retirement and death ==
Skovgaard became coach and managed most of her time in her local club Gentofte BK in Denmark. On 31 October 2024, Skovgaard died after a brief period fighting her illnesses. The funeral service took place in the Holte Church.

== Achievements ==
=== Commonwealth Games ===
Women's doubles
Year	Venue	Partner	Opponent	Score	Result
1978	Clare Drake Arena, Edmonton, Alberta, Canada	(England) Nora Perry	(Canada) Claire Backhouse (Canada) Jane Youngberg	10–15, 15–2, 15–12	Gold

=== European Championships ===
Women's doubles
Year	Venue	Partner	Opponent	Score	Result
1978	Guild Hall, Preston, England	(England) Nora Perry	(England) Jane Webster (England) Barbara Sutton	15–7, 15–7	Gold
1980	Martinihal, Groningen, Netherlands	(Denmark) Dorte Kjær	(England) Jane Webster (England) Nora Perry	4–15, 6–15	Bronze
1982	Sporthalle, Böblingen, West Germany	(Denmark) Lene Køppen	(England) Gillian Clark (England) Gillian Gilks	6–15, 2–15	Bronze

Mixed doubles
Year	Venue	Partner	Opponent	Score	Result
1982	Sporthalle, Böblingen, West Germany	(Denmark) Steen Skovgaard	(England) Martin Dew (England) Gillian Gilks	12–15, 8–15	Bronze

=== European Junior Championships ===
Girls' doubles
Year	Venue	Partner	Opponent	Score	Result
1973	Meadowbank, Edinburgh, Scotland	(England) Kathleen Whiting	(Denmark) Mette Myhre (Denmark) Susanne Berg	15–10, 7–15, 18–14	Gold

=== IBF World Grand Prix (2 runners-up) ===
The World Badminton Grand Prix was sanctioned by the International Badminton Federation from 1983 to 2006.

Mixed doubles
Year	Tournament	Partner	Opponent	Score	Result
1983	Dutch Open	(Denmark) Steen Skovgaard	(England) Martin Dew (England) Gillian Gilks	10–15, 16–17	(silver) Runner-up
1983	All England Open	(Denmark) Steen Skovgaard	(Sweden) Thomas Kihlström (England) Nora Perry	16–18, 15–11, 6–15	(silver) Runner-up

=== International tournaments (10 titles, 5 runners-up) ===
Women's singles
Year	Tournament	Opponent	Score	Result
1974	Welsh International			(gold) Winner
1976	Welsh International	(England) Paula Kilvington	8–11, 9–11	(silver) Runner-up

Women's doubles
Year	Tournament	Partner	Opponent	Score	Result
1972	Welsh International	(England) Kathleen Whiting			(gold) Winner
1973	Welsh International	(England) Kathleen Whiting	(Republic of Ireland) Barbara Beckett (Wales) Sue Alfieri	6–15, 15–11, 7–15	(silver) Runner-up
1974	Welsh International	(England) Margo Winter			(gold) Winner
1976	Welsh International	(England) Jane Webster	(England) Barbara Giles (England) Kathleen Whiting	15–5, 15–10	(gold) Winner
1977	Portugal International	(England) Karen Bridge			(gold) Winner
1978	Swedish Open	(England) Nora Perry	(England) Gillian Gilks (England) Paula Kilvington	15–9, 15–7	(gold) Winner
1978	Dutch Open	(England) Nora Perry	(Netherlands) Marjan Ridder (Netherlands) Joke van Beusekom	15–5, 15–6	(gold) Winner
1978	Scottish Open	(England) Paula Kilvington	(England) Jane Webster (England) Sue Whittaker	15–17, 15–5, 9–15	(silver) Runner-up
1978	German Open	(England) Nora Perry	(England) Barbara Sutton (England) Jane Webster	17–15, 15–5	(gold) Winner
1979	Denmark Open	(England) Nora Perry	(Japan) Atsuko Tokuda (Japan) Mikiko Takada	11–15, 9–15	(silver) Runner-up
1979	Swedish Open	(England) Nora Perry	(Denmark) Lene Køppen (Netherlands) Joke van Beusekom	10–15, 10–15	(silver) Runner-up

Mixed doubles
Year	Tournament	Partner	Opponent	Score	Result
1973	Welsh International	(England) Michael Wilks	(England) Alan Connor (England) Kathleen Whiting	15–10, 15–6	(gold) Winner
1980	German Open	(Denmark) Steen Skovgaard	(Scotland) Billy Gilliland (Scotland) Christine Heatly	15–6, 15–11	(gold) Winner
