= Anette Börjesson =

Swedish footballer and badminton player

Personal information
- Full name: Lilian Anette Börjesson
- Date of birth: 11 November 1954 (age 72)
- Place of birth: Sweden
- Position: Sweeper

Youth career
- Tuve IF

Senior career*
Years	Team	Apps	(Gls)
1978–91	Jitex BK	181	(52)
1985–87	GAIS	52	(13)
Total		233	(65)

International career^{‡}
1975–87	Sweden	70	(12)
- * Club domestic league appearances and goals as of 17:50, 18 November 2009 (UTC) ‡ National team caps and goals as of 17:50, 18 November 2009 (UTC)

Anette Börjesson
Medal record

Women's badminton

Representing Sweden

European Championships
Silver medal – second place	1980 Groningen	Women's singles
Silver medal – second place	1980 Groningen	Mixed doubles
Bronze medal – third place	1978 Preston	Women's singles
Bronze medal – third place	1982 Böblingen	Mixed doubles

European Mixed Team Championships
Silver medal – second place	1982 Böblingen	Mixed team
Bronze medal – third place	1978 Preston	Mixed team
Bronze medal – third place	1980 Groningen	Mixed team

European Junior Championships
Silver medal – second place	1973 Edinburgh	Girls' singles

Lilian Anette Börjesson (born 11 November 1954) is a retired female badminton player and footballer from Sweden.

== Badminton ==
Börjesson is a five time women's singles champion at the Swedish National Badminton Championships and was a silver medalist at the 1980 European Badminton Championships, also in singles, as well as in mixed doubles.

=== European Championships ===
Women's singles
Year	Venue	Opponent	Score	Result
1978	Preston, England	(Denmark) Lene Køppen	0–11, 2–11	Bronze
1980	Groningen, Netherlands	(Switzerland) Liselotte Blumer	4–11, 6–11	Silver

Mixed doubles
Year	Venue	Partner	Opponent	Score	Result
1980	Groningen, Netherlands	(Sweden) Lars Wengberg	(England) Mike Tredgett (England) Nora Perry	0–15, 6–15	Silver
1982	Böblingen, West Germany	(Sweden) Lars Wengberg	(England) Mike Tredgett (England) Nora Perry	8–15, 5–15	Bronze

== Football ==
She captained Sweden to their win in the 1984 European Competition for Women's Football. In the final against England, Börjesson struck the first penalty in Sweden's shootout victory. She won a total of 70 caps between 1975 and 1987, scoring 12 goals. In 1985 she scored a hat-trick of penalty kicks against France.

Börjesson won the Årets Fotbollstjej Award, the forerunner of the Diamantbollen, in 1982.

After her retirement from playing, Börjesson founded a magazine dedicated to women's football, called nya mål.

Börjesson can be seen in the Sveriges Television documentary television series The Other Sport from 2013.
