= 1986 European Badminton Championships =

Tournament details
- Dates: 30 March – 5 April
- Edition: 10
- Venue: Fyrishallen
- Location: Uppsala, Sweden

The 1986 European Badminton Championships was the 10th edition of the European Badminton Championships. It was held in Uppsala, Sweden, between 30 March and 5 April 1986, and hosted by the European Badminton Union and the Svenska Badmintonförbundet.

== Medal summary ==
=== Medalists ===
| Event | Gold | Silver | Bronze |
|---|---|---|---|
| Men's singles | (Denmark) Morten Frost | (Denmark) Ib Frederiksen | (Denmark) Michael Kjeldsen |
| Men's singles | (Denmark) Morten Frost | (Denmark) Ib Frederiksen | (Denmark) Torben Carlsen |
| Women's singles | (England) Helen Troke | (Denmark) Kirsten Larsen | (Sweden) Christine Magnusson |
| Women's singles | (England) Helen Troke | (Denmark) Kirsten Larsen | (Soviet Union) Svetlana Beliasova |
| Men's doubles | (Denmark) Steen Fladberg and Jesper Helledie | (Sweden) Stefan Karlsson and Thomas Kihlström | (Sweden) Jan-Eric Antonsson and Pär-Gunnar Jönsson |
| Men's doubles | (Denmark) Steen Fladberg and Jesper Helledie | (Sweden) Stefan Karlsson and Thomas Kihlström | (Denmark) Mark Christiansen and Michael Kjeldsen |
| Women's doubles | (England) Gillian Clark and Gillian Gowers | (Denmark) Dorte Kjær and Nettie Nielsen | (England) Karen Beckman and Sarah Halsall |
| Women's doubles | (England) Gillian Clark and Gillian Gowers | (Denmark) Dorte Kjær and Nettie Nielsen | (Sweden) Maria Bengtsson and Christine Magnusson |
| Mixed doubles | (England) Martin Dew and Gillian Gilks | (England) Nigel Tier and Gillian Gowers | (Sweden) Stefan Karlsson and Maria Bengtsson |
| Mixed doubles | (England) Martin Dew and Gillian Gilks | (England) Nigel Tier and Gillian Gowers | (Sweden) Thomas Kihlström and Christine Magnusson |
| Teams | Denmark | England | Sweden |

=== Medal table ===
* Host nation (Sweden)

| Rank | Nation | Gold | Silver | Bronze | Total |
|---|---|---|---|---|---|
| 1 | Denmark | 3 | 3 | 3 | 9 |
| 2 | England | 3 | 2 | 1 | 6 |
| 3 | Sweden* | 0 | 1 | 6 | 7 |
| 4 | Soviet Union | 0 | 0 | 1 | 1 |
| Totals (4 entries) | | 6 | 6 | 11 | 23 |

== Results ==
=== Semi-finals ===
| Category | Winner | Runner-up | Score |
|---|---|---|---|
| Men's singles | (Denmark) Morten Frost | (Denmark) Michael Kjeldsen | 7–15, 15–4, 15–3 |
| Men's singles | (Denmark) Ib Frederiksen | (Denmark) Torben Carlsen | 15–9, 15–10 |
| Women's singles | (Denmark) Kirsten Larsen | (Sweden) Christine Magnusson | 11–4, 11–6 |
| Women's singles | (England) Helen Troke | (Soviet Union) Svetlana Belyasova | 11–3, 11–7 |
| Men's doubles | (Denmark) Jesper Helledie (Denmark) Steen Fladberg | (Sweden) Jan-Eric Antonsson (Sweden) Pär-Gunnar Jönsson | 15–7, 15–5 |
| Men's doubles | (Sweden) Stefan Karlsson (Sweden) Thomas Kihlström | (Denmark) Mark Christiansen (Denmark) Michael Kjeldsen | 15–8, 15–6 |
| Women's doubles | (Denmark) Dorte Kjær (Denmark) Nettie Nielsen | (England) Karen Beckman (England) Sara Halsall | 15–8, 15–4 |
| Women's doubles | (England) Gillian Clark (England) Gillian Gowers | (Sweden) Christine Magnusson (Sweden) Maria Bengtsson | 15–10, 8–15, 15–11 |
| Mixed doubles | (England) Martin Dew (England) Gillian Gilks | (Sweden) Thomas Kihlström (Sweden) Christine Magnusson | 15–8, 15–8 |
| Mixed doubles | (England) Nigel Tier (England) Gillian Gowers | (Sweden) Stefan Karlsson (Sweden) Maria Bengtsson | 15–11, 15–12 |

=== Finals ===
| Category | Winners | Runners-up | Score |
|---|---|---|---|
| Men's singles | (Denmark) Morten Frost | (Denmark) Ib Frederiksen | 15–8, 15–2 |
| Women's singles | (England) Helen Troke | (Denmark) Kirsten Larsen | 9–12, 11–3, 11–2 |
| Men's doubles | (Denmark) Jesper Helledie (Denmark) Steen Fladberg | (Sweden) Stefan Karlsson (Sweden) Thomas Kihlström | 15–12, 18–17 |
| Women's doubles | (England) Gillian Clark (England) Gillian Gowers | (Denmark) Dorte Kjær (Denmark) Nettie Nielsen | 15–11, 15–12 |
| Mixed doubles | (England) Martin Dew (England) Gillian Gilks | (England) Nigel Tier (England) Gillian Gowers | 15–6, 15–8 |
