= Stefan Karlsson (badminton) =

Swedish badminton player

Personal information
- Born: 5 November 1955 (age 71)

Sport
- Country: Sweden
- Sport: Badminton
- Career titles: 1980, 1982 European Champion; 1983 All-England Champion
Medal record
Men's badminton
Representing Sweden
World Championships
Silver medal – second place	1985 Calgary	Mixed doubles
World Games
Silver medal – second place	1981 Santa Clara	Men's doubles
European Championships
Gold medal – first place	1980 Groningen	Men's doubles
Gold medal – first place	1982 Böblingen	Men's doubles
Silver medal – second place	1986 Uppsala	Men's doubles
Bronze medal – third place	1978 Preston	Men's doubles
Bronze medal – third place	1988 Kristiansand	Men's doubles
Bronze medal – third place	1986 Uppsala	Mixed doubles
European Mixed Team Championships
Silver medal – second place	1982 Böblingen	Mixed team
Silver medal – second place	1988 Kristiansand	Mixed team
Bronze medal – third place	1978 Preston	Mixed team
Bronze medal – third place	1980 Groningen	Mixed team
Bronze medal – third place	1986 Uppsala	Mixed team
European Junior Championships
Gold medal – first place	1973 Edinburgh	Boys' doubles

Stefan Karlsson (born 5 November 1955) is a retired badminton player from Sweden who competed at the highest world level. He later changed name to Stefan Mellgård.

== Career ==
Though he played Thomas Cup singles for Sweden and won the Swedish national singles title twice, his greatest successes came in doubles. He won men's doubles at the biennial European Championships twice, with Claes Nordin in 1980 and with Thomas Kihlström in 1982. In 1983 he shared the prestigious All-England men's doubles title with Kihlström. He won the silver medal at the 1985 IBF World Championships in mixed doubles with Maria Bengtsson.

== Achievements ==
=== World Games ===
Men's doubles
Year	Venue	Partner	Opponent	Score	Result
1981	San Jose Civic Auditorium, California, United States	(Sweden) Thomas Kihlström	(China) Sun Zhian (China) Yao Ximing	15–12, 4–15, 6–15	Silver

=== World Championships ===
Mixed doubles
Year	Venue	Partner	Opponent	Score	Result
1985	Olympic Saddledome, Calgary, Canada	(Sweden) Maria Bengtsson	(South Korea) Park Joo-bong (South Korea) Yoo Sang-hee	10–15, 15–12, 12–15	Silver

=== European Championships ===
Men's doubles
Year	Venue	Partner	Opponent	Score	Result
1978	Preston, England	(Sweden) Claes Nordin	(England) Mike Tredgett (England) Ray Stevens	12–15, 15–10, 4–15	Bronze
1980	Groningen, Netherlands	(Sweden) Claes Nordin	(Sweden) Bengt Fröman (Sweden) Thomas Kihlström	18–16, 9–15, 15–13	Gold
1982	Böblingen, West Germany	(Sweden) Thomas Kihlström	(England) Mike Tredgett (England) Martin Dew	15–9, 15–3	Gold
1986	Uppsala, Sweden	(Sweden) Thomas Kihlström	(Denmark) Steen Fladberg (Denmark) Jesper Helledie	12–15, 17–18	Silver
1988	Kristiansand, Norway	(Sweden) Peter Axelsson	(Denmark) Jan Paulsen (Denmark) Steen Fladberg	10–15, 15–7, 10–15	Bronze

Mixed doubles
Year	Venue	Partner	Opponent	Score	Result
1986	Uppsala, Sweden	(Sweden) Maria Bengtsson	(England) Nigel Tier (England) Gillian Gowers	11–15, 12–15	Bronze

=== European Junior Championships ===
Boys' doubles
Year	Venue	Partner	Opponent	Score	Result
1973	Edinburgh, Scotland	(Sweden) Willy Nilsson	(Denmark) Jesper Helledie (Denmark) Jacob Dynnes Hansen	15–9, 15–12	Gold

=== International Tournaments ===
Men's doubles
Year	Tournament	Partner	Opponent	Score	Result
1979	All England Open	(Sweden) Claes Nordin	(Indonesia) Tjun Tjun (Indonesia) Johan Wahjudi	16–17, 3–15	(silver) Runner-up
1980	English Masters	(Sweden) Thomas Kihlström	(Indonesia) Ade Chandra (Indonesia) Christian Hadinata	12–15, 12–15	(silver) Runner-up
1981	Copenhagen Cup	(Sweden) Thomas Kihlström	(Indonesia) Rudy Heryanto (Indonesia) Kartono Hariamanto	15–10, 12–15, 17–15	(gold) Winner
1981	Denmark Open	(Sweden) Thomas Kihlström	(Indonesia) Ade Chandra (Indonesia) Christian Hadinata	5–15, 18–15, 10–15	(silver) Runner-up
1981	Swedish Open	(Sweden) Thomas Kihlström	(Indonesia) Hadibowo (Indonesia) Bobby Ertanto	15–6, 15–4	(gold) Winner
1981	English Masters	(Sweden) Thomas Kihlström	(England) Mike Tredgett (England) Martin Dew	9–15, 15–2, 10–15	(silver) Runner-up
1981	India Open	(Sweden) Thomas Kihlström	(Indonesia) Rudy Heryanto (Indonesia) Kartono Hariamanto	6–15, 15–8, 17–15	(gold) Winner
1982	Swedish Open	(Sweden) Thomas Kihlström	(Indonesia) Christian Hadinata (Indonesia) Lius Pongoh	11–15, 8–15	(silver) Runner-up
1982	India Open	(Sweden) Thomas Kihlström	(South Korea) Park Joo-bong (South Korea) Lee Eun-ku	15–10, 15–12	(gold) Winner
1982	Hong Kong Open	(Sweden) Thomas Kihlström	(Indonesia) Rudy Heryanto (Indonesia) Kartono Hariamanto	13–15, 6–15	(silver) Runner-up
1982	Scandinavian Cup	(Sweden) Thomas Kihlström	(Denmark) Steen Fladberg (Denmark) Steen Skovgaard	15–13, 13–15, 15–10	(gold) Winner
1983	English Masters	(Sweden) Thomas Kihlström	(Indonesia) Rudy Heryanto (Indonesia) Kartono Hariamanto	12–15, 15–8, 15–11	(gold) Winner

=== IBF World Grand Prix ===
The World Badminton Grand Prix sanctioned by International Badminton Federation (IBF) from 1983 to 2006.

Men's doubles
Year	Tournament	Partner	Opponent	Score	Result
1983	Chinese Taipei Open	(Sweden) Thomas Kihlström	(Indonesia) Hadibowo (Indonesia) Bobby Ertanto	9–15, 11–15	(silver) Runner-up
1983	Japan Open	(Sweden) Thomas Kihlström	(Indonesia) Icuk Sugiarto (Indonesia) Rudy Heryanto	18–14, 6–15, 15–6	(gold) Winner
1983	Denmark Open	(Sweden) Thomas Kihlström			(gold) Winner
1983	Swedish Open	(Sweden) Thomas Kihlström	(Denmark) Steen Fladberg (Denmark) Jesper Helledie	15–4, 13–15, 10–15	(silver) Runner-up
1983	All England Open	(Sweden) Thomas Kihlström	(England) Martin Dew (England) Mike Tredgett	15–10, 15–13	(gold) Winner
1984	Chinese Taipei Open	(Sweden) Thomas Kihlström	(Denmark) Steen Fladberg (Denmark) Jesper Helledie	15–3, 15–6	(gold) Winner
1984	Japan Open	(Sweden) Thomas Kihlström	(England) Martin Dew (England) Steve Baddeley	15–6, 15–6	(gold) Winner
1984	Swedish Open	(Sweden) Thomas Kihlström	(South Korea) Kim Moon-soo (South Korea) Park Joo-bong	8–15, 15–10, 8–15	(silver) Runner-up
1985	Swedish Open	(Sweden) Thomas Kihlström	(China) Li Yongbo (China) Ding Qiqing	12–15, 18–14, 15–18	(silver) Runner-up
1987	Chinese Taipei Open	(Denmark) Mark Christiansen	(Indonesia) Eddy Hartono (Indonesia) Liem Swie King	4–15, 5–15	(silver) Runner-up
1987	Dutch Open	(Denmark) Mark Christiansen	(Indonesia) Rudy Gunawan (Indonesia) Bambang Subagio	15–8, 15–2	(gold) Winner
1987	Carlton-Intersport Cup	(Denmark) Mark Christiansen	(Denmark) Jesper Knudsen (Denmark) Henrik Svarrer	15–6, 15–10	(gold) Winner

Mixed doubles
Year	Tournament	Partner	Opponent	Score	Result
1985	Swedish Open	(Sweden) Maria Bengtsson	(South Korea) Lee Deuk-choon (South Korea) Chung Myung-hee	15–5, 11–15, 15–7	(gold) Winner
1985	Scandinavian Open	(Sweden) Maria Bengtsson	(England) Nigel Tier (England) Gillian Gowers	15–8, 5–15, 11–15	(silver) Runner-up
1987	Dutch Open	(Sweden) Maria Bengtsson	(Denmark) Mark Christiansen (Netherlands) Erica van Dijck	10–15, 15–2, 15–9	(gold) Winner
1987	Scandinavian Open	(Sweden) Maria Bengtsson	(China) Li Ang (China) Pan Zhenli	15–12, 7–15, 15–3	(gold) Winner
1987	World Grand Prix Finals	(Sweden) Maria Bengtsson	(Scotland) Billy Gilliland (England) Gillian Gowers	15–8, 18–15	(gold) Winner

=== IBF International ===
Men's doubles
Year	Tournament	Partner	Opponent	Score	Result
1983	Nordic Championships	(Sweden) Thomas Kihlström	(Denmark) Morten Frost (Denmark) Jens Peter Nierhoff	15–12, 17–15	(gold) Winner
1984	Nordic Championships	(Sweden) Thomas Kihlström	(Denmark) Mark Christiansen (Denmark) Michael Kjeldsen	15–11, 14–18, 18–14	(gold) Winner
1985	Nordic Championships	(Sweden) Thomas Kihlström	(Denmark) Mark Christiansen (Denmark) Michael Kjeldsen	15–6, 15–6	(gold) Winner

Mixed doubles
Year	Tournament	Partner	Opponent	Score	Result
1985	Nordic Championships	(Sweden) Maria Bengtsson	(Sweden) Thomas Kihlström (Sweden) Christine Magnusson	15–9, 15–7	(gold) Winner
