= 1982 European Badminton Championships =

Tournament details
- Dates: 13–18 April
- Edition: 8
- Venue: Sporthalle
- Location: Böblingen, West Germany

The 8th European Badminton Championships were held in Böblingen, West Germany, between 13 and 18 April 1982, and hosted by the European Badminton Union and Deutscher Badminton-Verband e.V..

== Medalists ==
| Event | Gold | Silver | Bronze |
|---|---|---|---|
| Men's singles | (Denmark) Jens Peter Nierhoff | (England) Ray Stevens | (Denmark) Claus Andersen |
| Men's singles | (Denmark) Jens Peter Nierhoff | (England) Ray Stevens | (England) Nick Yates |
| Women's singles | (Denmark) Lene Køppen | (England) Karen Bridge | (Sweden) Christine Magnusson |
| Women's singles | (Denmark) Lene Køppen | (England) Karen Bridge | (England) Jane Webster |
| Men's doubles | (Sweden) Stefan Karlsson and Thomas Kihlström | (England) Martin Dew and Mike Tredgett | (Sweden) Claes Nordin and Lars Wengberg |
| Men's doubles | (Sweden) Stefan Karlsson and Thomas Kihlström | (England) Martin Dew and Mike Tredgett | (England) Ray Stevens and Andy Goode |
| Women's doubles | (England) Gillian Gilks and Gillian Clark | (England) Nora Perry and Jane Webster | (Denmark) Dorte Kjaer and Nettie Nielsen |
| Women's doubles | (England) Gillian Gilks and Gillian Clark | (England) Nora Perry and Jane Webster | (Denmark) Lene Køppen and Anne Skovgaard |
| Mixed doubles | (England) Martin Dew and Gillian Gilks | (England) Mike Tredgett and Nora Perry | (Sweden) Lars Wengberg and Anette Börjesson |
| Mixed doubles | (England) Martin Dew and Gillian Gilks | (England) Mike Tredgett and Nora Perry | (Denmark) Steen Skovgaard and Anne Skovgaard |
| Teams | England | Sweden | Denmark |

== Results ==
=== Semi-finals ===
| Category | Winner | Runner-up | Score |
|---|---|---|---|
| Men's singles | (England) Ray Stevens | (Denmark) Claus Andersen | 15–8, 15–10 |
| Men's singles | (Denmark) Jens Peter Nierhoff | (England) Nick Yates | 15–10, 5–15, 15–4 |
| Women's singles | (Denmark) Lene Køppen | (Sweden) Christine Magnusson | 11–4, 11–1 |
| Women's singles | (England) Karen Bridge | (England) Jane Webster | 11–0, 11–2 |
| Men's doubles | (England) Martin Dew (England) Mike Tredgett | (Sweden) Claes Nordin (Sweden) Lars Wengberg | 15–5, 15–2 |
| Men's doubles | (Sweden) Stefan Karlsson (Sweden) Thomas Kihlström | (England) Andy Goode (England) Ray Stevens | 15–8, 15–4 |
| Women's doubles | (England) Jane Webster (England) Nora Perry | (Denmark) Dorte Kjær (Denmark) Nettie Nielsen | 15–9, 14–17, 15–11 |
| Women's doubles | (England) Gillian Clark (England) Gillian Gilks | (Denmark) Anne Skovgaard (Denmark) Lene Køppen | 15–6, 15–2 |
| Mixed doubles | (England) Mike Tredgett (England) Nora Perry | (Sweden) Lars Wengberg (Sweden) Anette Börjesson | 15–8, 15–5 |
| Mixed doubles | (England) Martin Dew (England) Gillian Gilks | (Denmark) Steen Skovgaard (Denmark) Anne Skovgaard | 15–12, 15–8 |

=== Finals ===
| Category | Winners | Runners-up | Score |
|---|---|---|---|
| Men's singles | (Denmark) Jens Peter Nierhoff | (England) Ray Stevens | 15–9, 15–4 |
| Women's singles | (Denmark) Lene Køppen | (England) Karen Bridge | 11–1, 11–9 |
| Men's doubles | (Sweden) Stefan Karlsson (Sweden) Thomas Kihlström | (England) Martin Dew (England) Mike Tredgett | 15–9, 15–3 |
| Women's doubles | (England) Gillian Clark (England) Gillian Gilks | (England) Jane Webster (England) Nora Perry | 15–3, 15–11 |
| Mixed doubles | (England) Martin Dew (England) Gillian Gilks | (England) Mike Tredgett (England) Nora Perry | 15–12, 15–5 |

== Medal account ==
* Host nation (West Germany)

| Rank | Nation | Gold | Silver | Bronze | Total |
|---|---|---|---|---|---|
| 1 | England | 3 | 5 | 3 | 11 |
| 2 | Denmark | 2 | 0 | 5 | 7 |
| 3 | Sweden | 1 | 1 | 3 | 5 |
| Totals (3 entries) | | 6 | 6 | 11 | 23 |
