= 2026 European Junior Badminton Championships =

Tournament details
- Dates: 18 – 27 August 2026
- Venue: Tatabánya Multifunctional Sport Hall
- Location: Tatabánya, Hungary

The 2026 European Junior Badminton Championships will be the 30th edition of the European Junior Badminton Championships. The championships will be held at the Tatabánya Multifunctional Sport Hall in Tatabánya, Hungary, from 18 to 27 August 2026 to crown the best U-19 badminton players in Europe.

== Tournament ==
The 2026 European Junior Badminton Championships was organized by Badminton Europe and Hungarian Badminton Association. It was consisted of the mixed team event and the individual event.

=== Venue ===
The tournament will be held at Tatabánya Multifunctional Sport Hall in Tatabánya, Hungary.

== Medal summary ==
=== Medalists ===
Event	Gold	Silver	Bronze
Teams	France Rayan Benaissa; Timeo Bourgin; Lenny Hubert; Clément Massias; Orphé Queton-Bouissou; Mady Sow; Arthur Tatranov; Melia Beule; Eva Bouville; Lily Gautier; Manon Heitzmann; Leana Laurent; Neela Lengue Te; Marjolene Raffin	Denmark Sebastian Mønster Andersen; Mikkel Eilersen Bouet; Alexander Brogaard; Viktor Skov Ellegaard; Frederik Hinding; Maximilian Ørding Kauffmann; Christopher Kunckel; Elias Martin; Birk Norman; Aske Rømer; Diya Mary Cherian; Astrid Kruse; Eline Landsvig; Sophia Loudrup; Ida Nissen; Filippa Pedersen; Rosa Rasmussen; Julie Søgaard; Athene Lyduch Thornild; Anna Louise Winther	Germany Jarno Deters; Linus Emmerich; Leon Kaschura; Fynn Ohliger; Jakob Sjöblom; Mats Wohlers; Milan Zeisig; Juna Bartsch; Lisa Paula Bonnemann; Marie Fein; Kalliope Hermel; Maike Iffland; Sarah Nickel; Charlotte Wendt
Teams	France Rayan Benaissa; Timeo Bourgin; Lenny Hubert; Clément Massias; Orphé Queton-Bouissou; Mady Sow; Arthur Tatranov; Melia Beule; Eva Bouville; Lily Gautier; Manon Heitzmann; Leana Laurent; Neela Lengue Te; Marjolene Raffin	Denmark Sebastian Mønster Andersen; Mikkel Eilersen Bouet; Alexander Brogaard; Viktor Skov Ellegaard; Frederik Hinding; Maximilian Ørding Kauffmann; Christopher Kunckel; Elias Martin; Birk Norman; Aske Rømer; Diya Mary Cherian; Astrid Kruse; Eline Landsvig; Sophia Loudrup; Ida Nissen; Filippa Pedersen; Rosa Rasmussen; Julie Søgaard; Athene Lyduch Thornild; Anna Louise Winther	Turkey Furkan Bultan; Fatih Erdoğan; Yiğitcan Erol; Gökay Göl; Mert Seven; Mehmet Can Töremiş; Muhammed Hasim Turksoy; Aysu Arslan; Nisa Nur Çimen; Elifnur Demir; Nimet Ergün; Aleyna Korkut; Nevra Mutlu; Zeynep Berre Ocakoğlu; Irmak Rana Yemişen; Yağmur Tuana Yemişen
Boys' singles	(France) Mady Sow	(Spain) Mario Rodríguez	(France) Arthur Tatranov
Boys' singles	(France) Mady Sow	(Spain) Mario Rodríguez	(France) Lenny Hubert
Girls' singles	(Ukraine) Raiia Almalalha	(Denmark) Athene Lyduch Thornild	(France) Leana Laurent
Girls' singles	(Ukraine) Raiia Almalalha	(Denmark) Athene Lyduch Thornild	(Belgium) Lea Dauphinais
Boys' doubles	(Denmark) Sebastian Mønster Andersen (Denmark) Birk Norman	(France) Rayan Benaissa (France) Mady Sow	(France) Timeo Bourgin (France) Orphé Queton-Bouissou
Boys' doubles	(Denmark) Sebastian Mønster Andersen (Denmark) Birk Norman	(France) Rayan Benaissa (France) Mady Sow	(Denmark) Mikkel Eilersen Bouet (Denmark) Maximilian Ørding Kauffmann
Girls' doubles	(Turkey) Elifnur Demir (Turkey) Zeynep Berre Ocakoğlu	(Switzerland) Victoria Dübendorfer (Switzerland) Sofia Uvarova	(Germany) Kalliope Hermel (Germany) Maike Iffland
Girls' doubles	(Turkey) Elifnur Demir (Turkey) Zeynep Berre Ocakoğlu	(Switzerland) Victoria Dübendorfer (Switzerland) Sofia Uvarova	(Turkey) Irmak Rana Yemişen (Turkey) Yağmur Tuana Yemişen
Mixed doubles	(Turkey) Gökay Göl (Turkey) Nisa Nur Çimen	(France) Rayan Benaissa (France) Manon Heitzmann	(France) Timeo Bourgin (France) Marjolene Raffin
Mixed doubles	(Turkey) Gökay Göl (Turkey) Nisa Nur Çimen	(France) Rayan Benaissa (France) Manon Heitzmann	(Turkey) Mert Seven (Turkey) Aysu Arslan

=== Medal table ===
* Host nation (Hungary)

Rank	Nation	Gold	Silver	Bronze	Total
1	France	2	2	5	9
2	Turkey	2	0	3	5
3	Denmark	1	2	1	4
4	Ukraine	1	0	0	1
5	Spain	0	1	0	1
5	Switzerland	0	1	0	1
7	Germany	0	0	2	2
8	Belgium	0	0	1	1
Totals (8 entries)		6	6	12	24
