= 2019 BWF World Senior Championships – 60+ =

Tournament details
- Dates: 4 August 2019 – 11 August 2019
- Edition: 9
- Level: International
- Competitors: 168 from 35 nations
- Venue: Spodek
- Location: Katowice, Poland

Champions
- Men's singles: (Indonesia) Arnold Dendeng
- Women's singles: (Israel) Svetlana Zilberman
- Men's doubles: (Denmark) Jesper Helledie (Scotland) Dan Travers
- Women's doubles: (Germany) Heidi Bender (Israel) Svetlana Zilberman
- Mixed doubles: (England) Ian M. Purton (England) Christine M. Crossley

These are the results of 2019 BWF World Senior Championships' 60+ events.

== Men's singles ==
=== Seeds ===
1. (Scotland) Dan Travers (silver medalist)
2. (Indonesia) Arnold Dendeng (gold medalist)
3. (Russia) Yuri Smirnov (bronze medalist)
4. (Denmark) Per Juul (bronze medalist)
5. (Austria) Tariq Farooq (fourth round)
6. (Malaysia) Ong Then Lin (fourth round)
7. (Australia) Loke Poh Wong (quarterfinals)
8. (Malaysia) Chan Wan Seong (second round)
9. (Germany) Rolf Rüsseler (fourth round)
10. (Sweden) Cheddi Liljeström (second round)
11. (Thailand) Chongsak Suvanich (fourth round)
12. (Netherlands) Rick Paap (third round)
13. (England) Eric Plane (second round)
14. (Denmark) Birger Steenberg (fourth round)
15. (Russia) Vladimir Koloskov (second round)
16. (Russia) Sergey Bushuev (quarterfinals)

=== Finals ===
Quarterfinals
1	(Scotland) Dan Travers	21	21
7	(Australia) Loke Poh Wong	15	12
3	(Russia) Yuri Smirnov	21	15	21
(Japan) Hiroyuki Koike	10	21	10
(Japan) Toshio Kawaguchi	13	14
4	(Denmark) Per Juul	21	21
16	(Russia) Sergey Bushuev	16	8
2	(Indonesia) Arnold Dendeng	21	21

Semifinals
1	(Scotland) Dan Travers	21	21
3	(Russia) Yuri Smirnov	18	14
4	(Denmark) Per Juul	15	12
2	(Indonesia) Arnold Dendeng	21	21

Final
1	(Scotland) Dan Travers	18	19
2	(Indonesia) Arnold Dendeng	21	21

=== Top half ===
==== Section 1 ====
First round

Second round
1	(Scotland) D Travers	19	21	21
(India) A Raman	21	17	14
(Slovakia) M Purdes	13	9
(Austria) R Hofmann	21	21
14	(Denmark) B Steenberg	21	21
(Ukraine) V Zabrodskyi	10	4
(Switzerland) P Dodd	21	23
(Estonia) P Ärmpalu	18	21

Third round
1	(Scotland) D Travers	21	21
(Austria) R Hofmann	2	8
14	(Denmark) B Steenberg	21	21
(Switzerland) P Dodd	9	10

Fourth round
1	(Scotland) D Travers	21	21
14	(Denmark) B Steenberg	11	17

==== Section 2 ====
First round
(France) P Jorssen	21	21
(United Arab Emirates) U Singh	12	15

Second round
7	(Australia) L P Wong	21	21
(Germany) R Petche	8	16
(Czech Republic) Z Homolka	22	18	14
(Poland) K Chmielewski	20	21	21
13	(England) E Plane	15	18
(Sweden) B Åberg	21	21
(Malaysia) Gan S H	11	18
(France) P Jorssen	21	21

Third round
7	(Australia) L P Wong	21	21
(Poland) K Chmielewski	16	12
(Sweden) B Åberg	21	18	20
(France) P Jorssen	15	21	22

Fourth round
7	(Australia) L P Wong	22	21
(France) P Jorssen	20	19

==== Section 3 ====
First round

Second round
3	(Russia) Y Smirnov	21	21
(India) D C Baurai	11	6
(England) D M. Cleary	21	23	21
(Denmark) J S Nielson	19	25	18
9	(Germany) R Rüsseler	21	21
(France) K Sethuraman	10	7
(Portugal) Mari Albuquerque	8	12
(Thailand) W Traisilpwissarut	21	21

Third round
3	(Russia) Y Smirnov	21	21
(England) D M. Cleary	16	13
9	(Germany) R Rüsseler	21	21
(Thailand) W Traisilpwissarut	18	10

Fourth round
3	(Russia) Y Smirnov	21	17	21
9	(Germany) R Rüsseler	16	21	19

==== Section 4 ====
First round
(Switzerland) L Schmit	13	21	7
(Japan) H Koike	21	15	21

Second round
6	(Malaysia) Ong T L	21	21
(Czech Republic) J Modlinger	4	11
(Finland) M Renvall	19	13
(Sweden) J Widoff	21	21
12	(Netherlands) R Paap	21	26
(United Arab Emirates) A K Abdul Latheef	19	24
(Poland) J Rudzinski	6	9
(Japan) H Koike	21	21

Third round
6	(Malaysia) Ong T L	21	21
(Sweden) J Widoff	17	8
12	(Netherlands) R Paap	4	10
(Japan) H Koike	21	21

Fourth round
6	(Malaysia) Ong T L	17	19
(Japan) H Koike	21	21

=== Bottom half ===
==== Section 5 ====
First round
(Azerbaijan) M Orujov	22	21	21
(India) D Shirivastava	24	18	19

Second round
(Azerbaijan) M Orujov	22	13	13
(Germany) A Benz	20	21	21
(Japan) T Kawaguchi	21	17	21
15	(Russia) V Koloskov	17	21	11
(Malaysia) K Lim K H	21	12	16
(Czech Republic) J Horáček	15	21	21
(Thailand) V Kimsunthorn	9	13
5	(Austria) T Farooq	21	21

Third round
(Germany) A Benz	22	17
(Japan) T Kawaguchi	24	21
(Czech Republic) J Horáček	6	11
5	(Austria) T Farooq	21	21

Fourth round
(Japan) T Kawaguchi	21	21
5	(Austria) T Farooq	18	11

==== Section 6 ====
First round

Second round
(England) P Jeffreys	15	12
(France) G Rolland	21	21
(United Arab Emirates) G S Kumar	24	16	23
10	(Sweden) C Liljeström	22	21	21
(Poland) B Cichocki	22	16
(Estonia) R Nuudi	24	21
(Belarus) S Rutkevich	17	16
4	(Denmark) P Juul	21	21

Third round
(France) G Rolland	6	10
(United Arab Emirates) G S Kumar	21	21
(Estonia) R Nuudi	8	19
4	(Denmark) P Juul	21	21

Fourth round
(United Arab Emirates) G S Kumar	14	11
4	(Denmark) P Juul	21	21

==== Section 7 ====
First round
(India) M A Baig	21	15	9
(Norway) M Aarhus	18	21	21

Second round
(Norway) M Aarhus	11	16
(Switzerland) C Heiniger	21	21
(Hong Kong) J J Zee	17	21	20
16	(Russia) S Bushuev	21	8	22
(Germany) M Eggers	21	13	21
(Ukraine) V Andrusenko	14	21	8
(Denmark) K Meier	20	21	21
8	(Malaysia) Chan W S	22	19	8

Third round
(Switzerland) C Heiniger	14	23
16	(Russia) S Bushuev	21	25
(Germany) M Eggers	19	21	21
(Denmark) K Meier	21	17	15

Fourth round
16	(Russia) S Bushuev	21	21
(Germany) M Eggers	17	12

==== Section 8 ====
First round

Second round
(Sweden) T Larsson	13	8
(England) G A Joyner	21	21
(France) M Piolot	14	21	5
11	(Thailand) C Suvanich	21	18	21
(Italy) M Fuda	9	9
(Poland) K Latawski	21	21
(Belgium) J Jacobs	7	11
2	(Indonesia) A Dendeng	21	21

Third round
(England) G A Joyner	13	15
11	(Thailand) C Suvanich	21	21
(Poland) K Latawski	12	21	17
2	(Indonesia) A Dendeng	21	18	21

Fourth round
11	(Thailand) C Suvanich	19	9
2	(Indonesia) A Dendeng	21	21

== Women's singles ==
=== Seeds ===
1. (Germany) Heidi Bender (silver medalist)
2. (Israel) Svetlana Zilberman (gold medalist)
3. (Japan) Kuniko Yamamoto (bronze medalist)
4. (Scotland) Christine Black (quarterfinals)

=== Finals ===
Semifinals
1	(Germany) Heidi Bender	21	11	21
3	(Japan) Kuniko Yamamoto	12	21	18
(Japan) Sugako Morita	9	13
2	(Israel) Svetlana Zilberman	21	21

Final
1	(Germany) Heidi Bender	6	13
2	(Israel) Svetlana Zilberman	21	21

=== Top half ===
==== Section 1 ====
First round
(England) A C. Bridge	21	21
(India) K S L Bhatta	16	16
(Russia) N Patrikeeva	15	21	16
(France) S Leverdez	21	16	21

Second round
1	(Germany) H Bender	21	21
(England) A C. Bridge	6	7
(Sweden) M Häggman	14	10
(France) S Leverdez	21	21

Quarterfinals
1	(Germany) H Bender	21	21
(France) S Leverdez	3	9

==== Section 2 ====
First round
(China) Yu XM	21	21
(England) C Davies	10	15
(Germany) H Mader	21	21
(India) M Sharma	9	11

Second round
3	(Japan) K Yamamoto	21	21
(China) Yu XM	9	18
(France) R Mouglalis	15	15
(Germany) H Mader	21	21

Quarterfinals
3	(Japan) K Yamamoto	21	21
(Germany) H Mader	14	3

=== Bottom half ===
==== Section 3 ====
First round
(England) U Heale	8	15
(Japan) S Morita	21	21
(Portugal) Marg Albuquerque	6	6
(Germany) K Viermann	21	21
(Thailand) S Narasak	w	/	o
(France) A Peype

Second round
(Japan) S Morita	21	21
(Germany) K Viermann	11	16
(Thailand) S Narasak	11	17
4	(Scotland) C Black	21	21

Quarterfinals
(Japan) S Morita	21	21
4	(Scotland) C Black	19	19

==== Section 4 ====
First round
(France) H Hay	16	11
(Germany) P Knacker	21	21
(England) A Baker	23	21
(India) N Pasricha	21	19

Second round
(Germany) P Knacker	21	18
(Poland) A Sadowska	23	21
(England) A Baker	1	1
2	(Israel) S Zilberman	21	21

Quarterfinals
(Poland) A Sadowska	7	13
2	(Israel) S Zilberman	21	21

== Men's doubles ==
=== Seeds ===
1. (England) Eric Plane / Roger Taylor (second round)
2. (England) John Molyneux / Ian M. Purton (bronze medalists)
3. (Russia) Vladimir Koloskov / Yuri Smirnov (second round)
4. (Austria) Tariq Farooq / (Denmark) Karsten Meier (quarterfinals)
5. (Malaysia) Chan Wan Seong / Ong Then Lin (quarterfinals)
6. (Russia) Sergey Bushuev / (Azerbaijan) Mirza Orujov (second round)
7. (Denmark) Per Juul / Birger Steenberg (silver medalists)
8. (Denmark) Jesper Helledie / (Scotland) Dan Travers (gold medalists)

=== Finals ===
Semifinals
(Thailand) Sarit Pisudchaikul (Thailand) Chongsak Suvanich	17	7
8	(Denmark) Jesper Helledie (Scotland) Dan Travers	21	21
7	(Denmark) Per Juul (Denmark) Birger Steenberg	21	21	24
2	(England) John Molyneux (England) Ian M. Purton	18	23	22

Final
8	(Denmark) Jesper Helledie (Scotland) Dan Travers	21	21
7	(Denmark) Per Juul (Denmark) Birger Steenberg	12	18

=== Top half ===
==== Section 1 ====
First round
(Belgium) J Jacobs (Belgium) A K Zulfiqar	21	18	21
(United Arab Emirates) A K Abdul Latheef (Bahrain) P George	18	21	11
(Poland) A Bittner (Poland) B Cichocki	7	15
(India) B S Chinshubam (India) K Leishangthem	21	21
(Germany) R Petche (Germany) H Walther	21	12	21
(France) P Jumeaux (France) G Rolland	12	21	8

Second round
1	(England) E Plane (England) R Taylor	22	21	11
(Thailand) S Pisudchaikul (Thailand) C Suvanich	24	15	21
(Estonia) P Ärmpalu (Estonia) R Nuudi	21	21
(Belgium) J Jacobs (Belgium) A K Zulfiqar	17	15
6	(Russia) S Bushev (Azerbaijan) M Orujov	15	18
(India) B S Chinshubam (India) K Leishangthem	21	21
(Switzerland) P Dodd (Finland) M Renvall	13	6
(Germany) R Petche (Germany) H Walther	21	21

Third round
(Thailand) S Pisudchaikul (Thailand) C Suvanich	21	21
(Estonia) P Ärmpalu (Estonia) R Nuudi	10	15
(India) B S Chinshubam (India) K Leishangthem	20	21	21
(Germany) R Petche (Germany) H Walther	22	10	19

Quarterfinals
(Thailand) S Pisudchaikul (Thailand) C Suvanich	21	21
(India) B S Chinshubam (India) K Leishangthem	15	17

==== Section 2 ====
First round
(Poland) Z Kozłowski (Poland) J Osadnik	11	9
(United Arab Emirates) G S Kumar (United Arab Emirates) U Singh	21	21
(France) J Y Breard (France) T Brunel	21	21
(India) D S Digari (India) B R S Pal	9	15
(Germany) J Buxan (Germany) M Weyer	w	/	o
(Netherlands) R Paap (Netherlands) M Voskuilen
(England) J Buckle (England) G A Joyner	21	21
(Malaysia) Gan S H (Malaysia) K Lim K H	4	12

Second round
4	(Austria) T Farooq (Denmark) K Meier	21	21
(United Arab Emirates) G S Kumar (United Arab Emirates) U Singh	16	14
(Thailand) S Choeysoongnern (Thailand) W Traisilpwissarut	21	21
(France) J Y Breard (France) T Brunel	9	17
8	(Denmark) J Helledie (Scotland) D Travers	21	21
(Germany) J Buxan (Germany) M Weyer	6	6
(Sweden) P Brandt (Sweden) C Liljeström	12	11
(England) J Buckle (England) G A Joyner	21	21

Third round
4	(Austria) T Farooq (Denmark) K Meier	21	21
(Thailand) S Choeysoongnern (Thailand) W Traisilpwissarut	14	16
8	(Denmark) J Helledie (Scotland) D Travers	21	21
(England) J Buckle (England) G A Joyner	7	13

Quarterfinals
4	(Austria) T Farooq (Denmark) K Meier	5	12
8	(Denmark) J Helledie (Scotland) D Travers	21	21

=== Bottom half ===
==== Section 3 ====
First round
SUB	(Sweden) B Åberg (Sweden) J Widoff	21	21
(Finland) A Niemi (Hong Kong) J J Zee	10	10
(England) D M. Cleary (England) R Mellor	19	15
(Japan) T Kawaguchi (Japan) S Yamamoto	21	21
(Portugal) Mari Albuquerque (Slovakia) M Purdes	7	7
(Switzerland) C Heiniger (Switzerland) L Schmit	21	21
(South Korea) Kim J-c (South Korea) Lee J-m	11	4
(Germany) D Frick (Germany) R Rüsseler	21	21

Second round
SUB	(Sweden) B Åberg (Sweden) J Widoff	19	21	18
(Thailand) A Maensamut (Thailand) S Palawan	21	13	21
(Japan) T Kawaguchi (Japan) S Yamamoto	16	21	22
7	(Denmark) P Juul (Denmark) B Steenberg	21	18	24
(Switzerland) C Heiniger (Switzerland) L Schmit	21	21
(Poland) K Chmielsewski (Poland) M Rosa	6	17
(Germany) D Frick (Germany) R Rüsseler	23	14	21
3	(Russia) V Koloskov (Russia) Y Smirnov	21	21	16

Third round
(Thailand) A Maensamut (Thailand) S Palawan	19	17
7	(Denmark) P Juul (Denmark) B Steenberg	21	21
(Switzerland) C Heiniger (Switzerland) L Schmit	18	15
(Germany) D Frick (Germany) R Rüsseler	21	21

Quarterfinals
7	(Denmark) P Juul (Denmark) B Steenberg	21	21
(Germany) D Frick (Germany) R Rüsseler	15	11

==== Section 4 ====
First round
(Germany) A Benz (Germany) J Molodet	21	21
(Czech Republic) Z Homolka (Czech Republic) J Modlinger	10	6
(Poland) J Rudzinski (Poland) M Szcześniewski	21	21
(Moldova) V Istrati (Moldova) D Navoloaca	16	8
(Denmark) J Dall-Hansen (Sweden) M Ericsson	22	21
(India) S Anekal (India) B N Sakaleshpura Krishnaiah	20	11

Second round
(Germany) A Benz (Germany) J Molodet	21	21
(France) M Piolot (France) K Sethuraman	14	16
(Poland) J Rudzinski (Poland) M Szcześniewski	13	15
5	(Malaysia) Chan W S (Malaysia) Ong T L	21	21
(Denmark) J Dall-Hansen (Sweden) M Ericsson	21	21
(Finland) J Kossila (Finland) A Kujala	19	13
(Sweden) T Larsson (Sweden) B Wigardt	15	9
2	(England) J Molyneux (England) I M. Purton	21	21

Third round
(Germany) A Benz (Germany) J Molodet	18	19
5	(Malaysia) Chan W S (Malaysia) Ong T L	21	21
(Denmark) J Dall-Hansen (Sweden) M Ericsson	15	19
2	(England) J Molyneux (England) I M. Purton	21	21

Quarterfinals
5	(Malaysia) Chan W S (Malaysia) Ong T L	24	21	19
2	(England) J Molyneux (England) I M. Purton	26	18	21

== Women's doubles ==
=== Seeds ===
1. (Germany) Heidi Bender / (Israel) Svetlana Zilberman (gold medalists)
2. (Japan) Sugako Morita / Kukiko Yamamoto (silver medalists)
3. (England) Jenny Cox / Christine M. Crossley (bronze medalists)
4. (England) Anne C. Bridge / Christina Davies (bronze medalists)

=== Finals ===
Semifinals
1	(Germany) Heidi Bender (Israel) Svetlana Zilberman	21	21
4	(England) Anne C. Bridge (England) Christina Davies	7	6
3	(England) Jenny Cox (England) Christine M. Crossley	14	7
2	(Japan) Sugako Morita (Japan) Kuniko Yamamoto	21	21

Final
1	(Germany) Heidi Bender (Israel) Svetlana Zilberman	21	21
2	(Japan) Sugako Morita (Japan) Kuniko Yamamoto	11	9

=== Top half ===
==== Section 1 ====
First round
(England) A Baker (England) U Heale	21	14	15
(Russia) M Burkat (Russia) N Patrikeeva	16	21	21

Second round
1	(Germany) H Bender (Israel) S Zilberman	w	/	o
(India) J Pradhu (India) N Pasricha
(Thailand) K Maensamut (Thailand) S Narasak	21	21
(Russia) M Burkat (Russia) N Patrikeeva	12	11

Quarterfinals
1	(Germany) H Bender (Israel) S Zilberman	21	21
(Thailand) K Maensamut (Thailand) S Narasak	4	8

==== Section 2 ====
First round
(Germany) E Schmidt (Germany) C Zimmermann	20	21	15
(Finland) E Kavander (Finland) S Korkiakoski	22	15	21

Second round
4	(England) A C. Bridge (England) C Davies	21	21
(Portugal) Marg Albuquerque (China) Yu XM	14	18
(France) H Hay (France) S Leverdez	8	18
(Finland) E Kavander (Finland) S Korkiakoski	21	21

Quarterfinals
4	(England) A C. Bridge (England) C Davies	21	21
(Finland) E Kavander (Finland) S Korkiakoski	19	16

=== Bottom half ===
==== Section 3 ====
First round
(Poland) A Sadowska (Poland) M Woźniak	21	21
(Sweden) M Häggman (Sweden) S Hermann	16	15
(Germany) B Müller (Germany) K Viermann	21	21
(France) D Nicolas (France) M-O Puyde	8	11

Second round
(Poland) A Sadowska (Poland) M Woźniak	12	23	19
SUB	(India) S Handattu Subraya (France) R Mouglalis	21	21	21
(Germany) B Müller (Germany) K Viermann	16	9
3	(England) J Cox (England) C M. Crossley	21	21

Quarterfinals
SUB	(India) S Handattu Subraya (France) R Mouglalis	8	5
3	(England) J Cox (England) C M. Crossley	21	21

==== Section 4 ====
First round	Second round				Quarterfinals
	(Germany) M Kiefer (Germany) K Kurth		11	11
	(England) R Baker (England) A Stretch		21	21
						(England) R Baker (England) A Stretch	19	10
					2	(Japan) S Morita (Japan) K Yamamoto	21	21
		(India) S Geeta (India) G Johri	5	3
	2	(Japan) S Morita (Japan) K Yamamoto	21	21

== Mixed doubles ==
=== Seeds ===
1. (England) Ian M. Purton / Christine M. Crossley (gold medalists)
2. (Scotland) Dan Travers / Christine Black (silver medalists)
3. (Denmark) Jens Dall-Hansen / Birte Bach Steffensen (quarterfinals)
4. (Japan) Toshio Kawaguchi / Masuyo Namura (second round)
5. (Malaysia) Ong Then Lin / (China) Yu Xiaomin (quarterfinals)
6. (Hong Kong) Jeffrey Jamin Zee / (Japan) Kuniko Yamamoto (quarterfinals)
7. (England) James Buckle / Anne C. Bridge (quarterfinals)
8. (England) Philip Ian Richardson / Jackie Hurst (bronze medalists)

=== Finals ===
Semifinals
1	(England) Ian M. Purton (England) Christine M. Crossley	21	21
(England) Roger Taylor (England) Andi Stretch	17	16
8	(England) Philip Ian Richardson (England) Jackie Hurst	21	12	12
2	(Scotland) Dan Travers (Scotland) Christine Black	15	21	21

Final
1	(England) Ian M. Purton (England) Christine M. Crossley	21	21
2	(Scotland) Dan Travers (Scotland) Christine Black	19	12

=== Top half ===
==== Section 1 ====
First round
(France) G Rolland (France) H Hay	21	21
(Germany) J Molodet (Germany) M Kiefer	19	19

Second round
1	(England) I M. Purton (England) C M. Crossley	21	21
(Poland) M Szcześniewski (Poland) A Sadowska	10	6
(Thailand) W Traisilpwissarut (Thailand) S Narasak	15	15
(Sweden) M Ericsson (Sweden) S Hermann	21	21
5	(Malaysia) Ong T L (China) Yu XM	21	21
(India) M A Baig (India) S Handattu Subraya	11	6
(Finland) J Kossila (Finland) S Korkiakoski	21	21
(France) G Rolland (France) H Hay	19	18

Third round
1	(England) I M. Purton (England) C M. Crossley	21	21
(Sweden) M Ericsson (Sweden) S Hermann	15	7
5	(Malaysia) Ong T L (China) Yu XM	21	21
(Finland) J Kossila (Finland) S Korkiakoski	12	13

Quarterfinals
1	(England) I M. Purton (England) C M. Crossley	21	21
5	(Malaysia) Ong T L (China) Yu XM	14	11

==== Section 2 ====
First round
(Sweden) P Brandt (Finland) E Kavander	21	21
(Portugal) Mari Albuquerque (Portugal) Marg Albuquerque	12	10

Second round
4	(Japan) T Kawaguchi (Japan) M Namura	9	7
(England) R Taylor (England) A Stretch	21	21
(Switzerland) P Dodd (Russia) M Burkat	16	12
(Germany) J Buxan (Germany) P Knacker	21	21
6	(Hong Kong) J J Zee (Japan) K Yamamoto	19	21	21
(Russia) S Bushuev (Russia) N Patrikeeva	21	10	12
SUB	(France) J Y Breard (France) R Mouglalis	21	21
(Sweden) P Brandt (Finland) E Kavander	18	14

Third round
(England) R Taylor (England) A Stretch	21	21
(Germany) J Buxan (Germany) P Knacker	10	6
6	(Hong Kong) J J Zee (Japan) K Yamamoto	21	21
SUB	(France) J Y Breard (France) R Mouglalis	12	16

Quarterfinals
(England) R Taylor (England) A Stretch	21	21
6	(Hong Kong) J J Zee (Japan) K Yamamoto	18	17

=== Bottom half ===
==== Section 3 ====
First round
(Ukraine) O Ishchenko (Ukraine) V Velidchenko	w	/	o
(India) M Balusamy Rajaram (India) J Prabhu

Second round
(Ukraine) O Ishchenko (Ukraine) V Velidchenko	19	14
(Sweden) B Åberg (Sweden) M Häggman	21	21
(South Korea) Kim J-c (South Korea) Kim H-j	13	7
8	(England) P I Richardson (England) J Hurst	21	21
(Poland) J Bełus (Poland) G Bełus	8	12
(France) M Piolot (France) D Nicolas	21	21
(Finland) A Kujala (Finland) A Pelkonen	15	7
3	(Denmark) J Dall-Hansen (Denmark) B Bach Steffensen	21	21

Third round
(Sweden) B Åberg (Sweden) M Häggman	16	18
8	(England) P I Richardson (England) J Hurst	21	21
(France) M Piolot (France) D Nicolas	17	14
3	(Denmark) J Dall-Hansen (Denmark) B Bach Steffensen	21	21

Quarterfinals
8	(England) P I Richardson (England) J Hurst	21	15	21
3	(Denmark) J Dall-Hansen (Denmark) B Bach Steffensen	15	21	19

==== Section 4 ====
First round
(Poland) M Rosa (Poland) M Woźniak	9	14
(Denmark) K Meier (Germany) M-L Schulta-Jansen	21	21

Second round
(Denmark) K Meier (Germany) M-L Schulta-Jansen	21	21
(Germany) H Walther (Germany) E Schmidt	19	12
(France) T Brunel (France) S Leverdez	17	16
7	(England) J Buckle (England) A C. Bridge	21	21
(Denmark) B Steenberg (Scotland) J Gladwin Greig	10	21	12
(Thailand) A Maensamut (Thailand) K Maensamut	21	13	21
(India) B N Sakaleshpura Krishnaiah (India) K S L Bhatta	11	13
2	(Scotland) D Travers (Scotland) C Black	21	21

Third round
(Denmark) K Meier (Germany) M-L Schulta-Jansen	12	21	16
7	(England) J Buckle (England) A C. Bridge	21	16	21
(Thailand) A Maensamut (Thailand) K Maensamut	18	18
2	(Scotland) D Travers (Scotland) C Black	21	21

Quarterfinals
7	(England) J Buckle (England) A C. Bridge	21	7	17
2	(Scotland) D Travers (Scotland) C Black	18	21	21
