= 1973 European Junior Badminton Championships =

Badminton championships

Tournament details
- Dates: 19–21 April 1973
- Edition: 3rd
- Venue: Meadowbank
- Location: Edinburgh, Scotland

The 1973 European Junior Badminton Championships was the third edition of the European Junior Badminton Championships. It was held in Edinburgh, Scotland, in the month of April. Danish players won both the singles disciplines and mixed doubles while England won Girls' doubles, and Sweden won Boys' doubles title.

== Medalists ==
Discipline	Gold	Silver	Bronze
Boys' singles	(Denmark) Jesper Helledie	(Norway) Petter Thoresen	(Sweden) Willy Nilsson
Boys' singles	(Denmark) Jesper Helledie	(Norway) Petter Thoresen	(Sweden) Christian Lundberg
Girls' singles	(Denmark) Mette Myhre	(Sweden) Anette Börjesson	(Netherlands) Els van Eeuwijk
Girls' singles	(Denmark) Mette Myhre	(Sweden) Anette Börjesson	(England) Kathleen Whiting
Boys' doubles	(Sweden) Stefan Karlsson (Sweden) Willy Nilsson	(Denmark) Jesper Helledie (Denmark) Jacob Dynnes Hansen	(Scotland) Gordon Hamilton (Scotland) Alan Gilliland
Boys' doubles	(Sweden) Stefan Karlsson (Sweden) Willy Nilsson	(Denmark) Jesper Helledie (Denmark) Jacob Dynnes Hansen	(Sweden) Christian Lundberg (Sweden) Claes Nordin
Girls' doubles	(England) Anne Forrest (England) Kathleen Whiting	(Denmark) Mette Myhre (Denmark) Susanne Berg	(Denmark) Marianne Christensen (Denmark) Susanne Johansen
Girls' doubles	(England) Anne Forrest (England) Kathleen Whiting	(Denmark) Mette Myhre (Denmark) Susanne Berg	(England) Kathleen Redhead (England) Debbie Kirby
Mixed doubles	(Denmark) Jesper Helledie (Denmark) Susanne Johansen	(Denmark) Hans Olaf Birkholm (Denmark) Mette Myhre	(Denmark) Hans Hjulmand (Denmark) Susanne Berg
Mixed doubles	(Denmark) Jesper Helledie (Denmark) Susanne Johansen	(Denmark) Hans Olaf Birkholm (Denmark) Mette Myhre	(Scotland) Alan Gilliland (Scotland) Christine Heatly

== Results ==
=== Semi-finals ===
Category	Winner	Runner-up	Score
Boys' singles	(Denmark) Jesper Helledie	(Sweden) Willy Nilsson	15–10, 15–9
Boys' singles	(Norway) Petter Thoresen	(Sweden) Christian Lundberg	15–11, 15–12
Girls' singles	(Denmark) Mette Myhre	(England) Kathleen Whiting	11–2, 11–7
Girls' singles	(Sweden) Anette Börjesson	(Netherlands) Els van Eeuwijk	11–7, 11–6
Boys' doubles	(Sweden) Stefan Karlsson (Sweden) Willy Nilsson	(Scotland) Alan Gilliland (Scotland) Gordon Hamilton	15–9, 18–13
Boys' doubles	(Denmark) Jacob Dynnes Hansen (Denmark) Jesper Helledie	(Sweden) Christian Lundberg (Sweden) Claes Nordin	10–15, 15–5, 18–14
Girls' doubles	(Denmark) Mette Myhre (Denmark) Susanne Berg	(England) Debbie Kirby (England) Kathleen Redhead	15–3, 15–9
Girls' doubles	(England) Anne Forrest (England) Kathleen Whiting	(Denmark) Marianne Christensen (Denmark) Susanne Johansen	18–15, 1–15, 15–6
Mixed doubles	(Denmark) Jesper Helledie (Denmark) Susanne Johansen	(Denmark) Hans Hjulmand (Denmark) Susanne Berg	15–4, 15–18, 15–10
Mixed doubles	(Denmark) Hans Olaf Birkholm (Denmark) Mette Myhre	(Scotland) Alan Gilliland (Scotland) Christine Heatly	10–15, 15–4, 15–5

=== Finals ===
Category	Winners	Runners-up	Score
Boys' singles	(Denmark) Jesper Helledie	(Norway) Petter Thoresen	15–1, 15–7
Girls' singles	(Denmark) Mette Myhre	(Sweden) Anette Börjesson	1–11, 12–9, 11–6
Boys' doubles	(Sweden) Stefan Karlsson (Sweden) Willy Nilsson	(Denmark) Jacob Dynnes Hansen (Denmark) Jesper Helledie	15–9, 15–12
Girls' doubles	(England) Anne Forrest (England) Kathleen Whiting	(Denmark) Mette Myhre (Denmark) Susanne Berg	15–10, 7–15, 18–14
Mixed doubles	(Denmark) Jesper Helledie (Denmark) Susanne Johansen	(Denmark) Hans Olaf Birkholm (Denmark) Mette Myhre	15–8, 15–10

== Medal table ==
Rank	Nation	Gold	Silver	Bronze	Total
1	Denmark (DEN)	3	3	2	8
2	Sweden (SWE)	1	1	3	5
3	England (ENG)	1	0	2	3
4	Norway (NOR)	0	1	0	1
5	Scotland (SCO)	0	0	2	2
6	Netherlands (NED)	0	0	1	1
Totals (6 entries)		5	5	10	20
