= 1991 Singapore Open =

Tournament details
- Dates: 17 July 1991– 21 July 1991
- Edition: 45th
- Level: World Grand Prix 4 Stars
- Total prize money: US$90,000
- Venue: Singapore Indoor Stadium
- Location: Kallang, Singapore

Champions
- Men's singles: (Indonesia) Bambang Suprianto
- Women's singles: (China) Huang Hua
- Men's doubles: (South Korea) Kim Moon-soo (South Korea) Park Joo-bong
- Women's doubles: (South Korea) Chung Myung-hee (South Korea) Chung So-young
- Mixed doubles: (Denmark) Thomas Lund (Denmark) Pernille Dupont

The 1991 Singapore Open (also known as the Konica Cup) was a four-star badminton tournament that took place at the Singapore Indoor Stadium in Singapore, from July 17 to July 21, 1991. The total prize money on offer was US$90,000.

== Final results ==
Category	Winners	Runners-up	Score
Men's singles	(Indonesia) Bambang Suprianto	(Indonesia) Fung Permadi	15–9, 15–8
Women's singles	(China) Huang Hua	(China) Zhou Lei	11–5, 7–11, 11–2
Men's doubles	(South Korea) Kim Moon-soo & Park Joo-bong	(China) Huang Zhanzhong & Zheng Yumin	15–2, 15–4
Women's doubles	(South Korea) Chung Myung-hee & Chung So-young	(Sweden) Christine Gandrup & Lim Xiaoqing	15–11, 15–3
Mixed doubles	(Denmark) Thomas Lund & Pernille Dupont	(Sweden) Pär-Gunnar Jönsson & Maria Bengtsson	15–8, 15–12
