= 1980 European Badminton Championships =

Badminton competition held in the Netherlands

Tournament details
- Dates: 17–20 April
- Edition: 7
- Venue: Martinihal
- Location: Groningen, Netherlands

The 7th European Badminton Championships were held in Groningen (Netherlands), between 17 and 20 April 1980, and hosted by the European Badminton Union and the Nederlandse Badminton Bond.

== Medalists ==
Event	Gold	Silver	Bronze
Men's singles	(Denmark) Flemming Delfs	(Denmark) Morten Frost	(Denmark) Svend Pri
Men's singles	(Denmark) Flemming Delfs	(Denmark) Morten Frost	(England) Ray Stevens
Women's singles	(Switzerland) Liselotte Blumer	(Sweden) Anette Börjesson	(England) Jane Webster
Women's singles	(Switzerland) Liselotte Blumer	(Sweden) Anette Börjesson	(Sweden) Lena Axelsson
Men's doubles	(Sweden) Claes Nordin and Stefan Karlsson	(Sweden) Bengt Fröman and Thomas Kihlström	(Denmark) Flemming Delfs and Steen Skovgaard
Men's doubles	(Sweden) Claes Nordin and Stefan Karlsson	(Sweden) Bengt Fröman and Thomas Kihlström	(England) Mike Tredgett and Ray Stevens
Women's doubles	(England) Jane Webster and Nora Perry	(Denmark) Kirsten Larsen and Pia Nielsen	(Denmark) Anne Skovgaard and Dorte Kjaer
Women's doubles	(England) Jane Webster and Nora Perry	(Denmark) Kirsten Larsen and Pia Nielsen	(Soviet Union) Alla Prodan and Nadezhda Litvincheva
Mixed doubles	(England) Mike Tredgett and Nora Perry	(Sweden) Lars Wengberg and Anette Börjesson	(Scotland) Billy Gilliland and Christine Heatly
Mixed doubles	(England) Mike Tredgett and Nora Perry	(Sweden) Lars Wengberg and Anette Börjesson	(England) Derek Talbot and Karen Chapman
Teams	Denmark	England	Sweden

== Results ==
=== Semi-finals ===
Category	Winner	Runner-up	Score
Men's singles	(Denmark) Morten Frost	(Denmark) Svend Pri	15–5, 15–8
Men's singles	(Denmark) Flemming Delfs	(England) Ray Stevens	15–7, 15–3
Women's singles	(Sweden) Anette Börjesson	(England) Jane Webster	11–5, 5–11, 11–2
Women's singles	(Switzerland) Liselotte Blumer	(Sweden) Lena Axelsson	0–11, 11–4, 12–9
Men's doubles	(Sweden) Claes Nordin (Sweden) Stefan Karlsson	(Denmark) Flemming Delfs (Denmark) Steen Skovgaard	15–3, 18–13
Men's doubles	(Sweden) Bengt Fröman (Sweden) Thomas Kihlström	(England) Mike Tredgett (England) Ray Stevens	15–11, 15–10
Women's doubles	(England) Jane Webster (England) Nora Perry	(Denmark) Anne Skovgaard (Denmark) Dorte Kjær	15–4, 15–6
Women's doubles	(Denmark) Kirsten Larsen (Denmark) Pia Nielsen	(Soviet Union) Alla Prodan (Soviet Union) Nadezhda Litvincheva	15–7, 15–11
Mixed doubles	(England) Mike Tredgett (England) Nora Perry	(Scotland) Billy Gilliland (Scotland) Christine Heatly	6–15, 15–7, 18–13
Mixed doubles	(Sweden) Lars Wengberg (Sweden) Anette Börjesson	(England) Derek Talbot (England) Karen Chapman	9–15, 15–9, 15–12

=== Finals ===
Category	Winners	Runners-up	Score
Men's singles	(Denmark) Flemming Delfs	(Denmark) Morten Frost	15–4, 1–15, 17–14
Women's singles	(Switzerland) Liselotte Blumer	(Sweden) Anette Börjesson	11–4, 11–6
Men's doubles	(Sweden) Claes Nordin (Sweden) Stefan Karlsson	(Sweden) Bengt Fröman (Sweden) Thomas Kihlström	18–16, 9–15, 15–13
Women's doubles	(England) Jane Webster (England) Nora Perry	(Denmark) Kirsten Larsen (Denmark) Pia Nielsen	15–8, 15–13
Mixed doubles	(England) Mike Tredgett (England) Nora Perry	(Sweden) Lars Wengberg (Sweden) Anette Börjesson	15–0, 15–6

== Medal account ==
* Host nation (Netherlands)

Rank	Nation	Gold	Silver	Bronze	Total
1	Denmark	2	2	3	7
2	England	2	1	4	7
3	Sweden	1	3	2	6
4	Switzerland	1	0	0	1
5	Scotland	0	0	1	1
5	Soviet Union	0	0	1	1
Totals (6 entries)		6	6	11	23
