= Denmark national badminton team =

Danish national badminton team

Denmark
- Association: Badminton Denmark
- Confederation: Badminton Europe
- President: Tore Vilhelmsen

BWF ranking
- Current ranking: 6 ▼1 (6 October 2026)
- Highest ranking: 2 (5 January 2012)

Sudirman Cup
- Appearances: 17 (first in 1989)
- Best result: Runners-up (1999, 2011)

Thomas Cup
- Appearances: 34 (first in 1949)
- Best result: Champions (2016)

Uber Cup
- Appearances: 24 (first in 1957)
- Best result: Runners-up (1957, 1960, 2000)

European Mixed Team Championships
- Appearances: 28 (first in 1972)
- Best result: Champions (1976, 1980, 1986, 1988, 1990, 1996, 1998, 2000, 2002, 2004, 2006, 2008, 2009, 2011, 2015, 2017, 2019, 2021, 2023, 2025)

European Men's Team Championships
- Appearances: 8 (first in 2006)
- Best result: Champions (2006, 2008, 2010, 2012, 2014, 2016, 2018, 2020)

European Women's Team Championships
- Appearances: 8 (first in 2006)
- Best result: Champions (2008, 2010, 2014, 2016, 2018, 2020)

The Denmark national badminton team (Danish: Danmarks badmintonlandshold) is a badminton team located in Denmark and represents the nation of Denmark in international badminton team competitions. It is controlled by Badminton Denmark, the governing body for badminton in Denmark.

== Competitive record ==
=== Thomas Cup ===
Year	Round	Pos
1949	Runners-up	2nd
1952	First round inter-zone	4th
1955	Runners-up	2nd
1958	First round inter-zone	4th
1961	Second round inter-zone	3rd
1964	Runners-up	2nd
1967	First round inter-zone	4th
1970	Second round inter-zone	3rd
1973	Runners-up	2nd
1976	Second round inter-zone	3rd
1979	Runners-up	2nd
1982	Semi-finals	3rd
1984	Group stage	5th
1986	Fourth place	4th
1988	Fourth place	4th
1990	Semi-finals	4th
1992	Group stage	7th
1994	Group stage	5th
1996	Runners-up	2nd
1998	Semi-finals	3rd
2000	Semi-finals	4th
2002	Semi-finals	4th
2004	Runners-up	2nd
2006	Runners-up	2nd
2008	Quarter-finals	5/8
2010	Quarter-finals	5/8
2012	Semi-finals	3rd
2014	Quarter-finals	5/8
2016	Champions	1st
2018	Semi-finals	3rd
2020	Semi-finals	3rd
2022	Semi-finals	3rd
2024	Quarter-finals	6th
2026	Semi-finals	4th
2028	To be determined	
2030	To be determined	

=== Uber Cup ===
Year	Round	Pos
1957	Runners-up	2nd
1960	Runners-up	2nd
1963	Did not enter	
1966	Did not qualify	
1969	Did not qualify	
1972	Second round inter-zone	3rd
1975	Did not qualify	
1978	Second round inter-zone	3rd
1981	Did not qualify	
1984	Fourth place	4th
1986	Group stage	6th
1988	Group stage	7th
1990	Group stage	7th
1992	Did not qualify	
1994	Group stage	5th
1996	Semi-finals	4th
1998	Semi-finals	4th
2000	Runners-up	2nd
2002	Group stage	7th
2004	Semi-finals	3rd
2006	Did not qualify	
2008	Quarter-finals	5/8
2010	Quarter-finals	5/8
2012	Quarter-finals	5/8
2014	Quarter-finals	5/8
2016	Quarter-finals	8th
2018	Quarter-finals	6th
2020	Quarter-finals	7th
2022	Quarter-finals	7th
2024	Quarter-finals	6th
2026	Quarter-finals	8th
2028	To be determined	
2030	To be determined	

=== Sudirman Cup ===
Year	Round	Pos
1989	Semi-finals	4th
1991	Semi-finals	4th
1993	Semi-finals	4th
1995	Semi-finals	4th
1997	Semi-finals	4th
1999	Runners-up	2nd
2001	Semi-finals	3rd
2003	Semi-finals	3rd
2005	Semi-finals	3rd
2007	Group stage	6th
2009	Group stage	5th
2011	Runners-up	2nd
2013	Semi-finals	3rd
2015	Quarter-finals	5/8
2017	Quarter-finals	5/8
2019	Quarter-finals	5/8
2021	Quarter-finals	7th
2023	Quarter-finals	8th
2025	Quarter-finals	7th
2027	To be determined	
2029	To be determined	

=== European Team Championships ===
==== Men's team ====
Year	Round	Pos
2006	Champions	1st
2008	Champions	1st
2010	Champions	1st
2012	Champions	1st
2014	Champions	1st
2016	Champions	1st
2018	Champions	1st
2020	Champions	1st
2024	Champions	1st
2026	Runners-up	2nd
2028	To be determined	
2030	To be determined	

==== Women's team ====
Year	Round	Pos
2006	Fourth place	4th
2008	Champions	1st
2010	Champions	1st
2012	Runners-up	2nd
2014	Champions	1st
2016	Champions	1st
2018	Champions	1st
2020	Champions	1st
2024	Champions	1st
2026	Runners-up	2nd
2028	To be determined	
2030	To be determined	

==== Mixed team ====
Year	Round	Pos
1972	Runners-up	2nd
1974	Runners-up	2nd
1976	Champions	1st
1978	Runners-up	2nd
1980	Champions	1st
1982	Third place	3rd
1984	Runners-up	2nd
1986	Champions	1st
1988	Champions	1st
1990	Champions	1st
1992	Runners-up	2nd
1994	Runners-up	2nd
1996	Champions	1st
1998	Champions	1st
2000	Champions	1st
2002	Champions	1st
2004	Champions	1st
2006	Champions	1st
2008	Champions	1st
2009	Champions	1st
2011	Champions	1st
2013	Runners-up	2nd
2015	Champions	1st
2017	Champions	1st
2019	Champions	1st
2021	Champions	1st
2023	Champions	1st
2025	Champions	1st
2027	Qualified as reigning champions	
2029	To be determined	

**Red border color indicates tournament was held on home soil.

== Junior competitive record ==
=== Suhandinata Cup ===
Year	Round	Pos
2000	Group stage	11th
2002	Group stage	10th
2004	Group stage	7th
2006	Group stage	13th
2007	Did not enter	
2008	Did not enter	
2009	Group stage	9th
2010	Group stage	6th
2011	Group stage	9th
2012	Did not enter	
2013	Group stage	11th
2014	Group stage	9th
2015	Group stage	7th
2016	Quarter-finals	7th
2017	Group stage	17th
2018	Quarter-finals	8th
2019	Quarter-finals	6th
2020	Cancelled because of COVID-19 pandemic	
2021	Cancelled because of COVID-19 pandemic	
2022	Group stage	10th
2023	Group stage	13th
2024	Quarter-finals	8th
2025	Group stage	14th of 36
2026	Group stage	9th of 47

=== European Junior Team Championships ===
==== Mixed team ====
Year	Round	Pos
1975	Champions	1st
1977	Runners-up	2nd
1979	Champions	1st
1981	Champions	1st
1983	Runners-up	2nd
1985	Champions	1st
1987	Champions	1st
1989	Champions	1st
1991	Third place	3rd
1993	Champions	1st
1995	Champions	1st
1997	Champions	1st
1999	Third place	3rd
2001	Runners-up	2nd
2003	Runners-up	2nd
2005	Champions	1st
2007	Third place	3rd
2009	Champions	1st
2011	Semi-finals	3rd
2013	Champions	1st
2015	Semi-finals	3rd
2017	Semi-finals	3rd
2018	Runners-up	2nd
2020	Champions	1st
2022	Champions	1st
2024	Champions	1st
2026	Runners-up	2nd

**Red border color indicates tournament was held on home soil.

== Current squad ==
The following still active players were selected to represent Denmark at the 2022 Thomas & Uber Cup.

Male players

- Viktor Axelsen
- Anders Antonsen
- Rasmus Gemke
- Victor Svendsen
- Kim Astrup
- Anders Skaarup Rasmussen
- Rasmus Kjær
- Lasse Mølhede
- Jeppe Bay
- Mathias Christiansen
- Frederik Søgaard

Female players

- Mia Blichfeldt
- Line Christophersen
- Line Kjærsfeldt
- Julie Dawall Jakobsen
- Sara Thygesen
- Maiken Fruergaard
- Amalie Magelund
- Alexandra Bøje
- Amalie Schulz
- Rikke Søby Hansen
