= European Junior Badminton Championships =

Badminton championships

The European Junior Badminton Championships is a tournament organized by the Badminton Europe (BE) since 1969, and is held once every two years to crown the best junior badminton players in Europe. Team events were added to the program since the 1975 edition in Copenhagen, Denmark.

== Championships ==
Host cities of the European Badminton Championships

Year	Number	Host City	Events
1969	1	Voorburg, Netherlands	5
1971	2	Gottwaldov, Czechoslovakia	5
1973	3	Edinburgh, Scotland	5
1975	4	Copenhagen, Denmark	6
1977	5	Ta' Qali, Malta	6
1979	6	Mülheim, West Germany	6
1981	7	Edinburgh, Scotland	6
1983	8	Helsinki, Finland	6
1985	9	Pressbaum, Austria	6
1987	10	Warsaw, Poland	6
1989	11	Manchester, England	6
1991	12	Budapest, Hungary	6
1993	13	Sofia, Bulgaria	6
1995	14	Nitra, Slovakia	6
1997	15	Nymburk, Czech Republic	6

Year	Number	Host City	Events
1999	16	Glasgow, Scotland	6
2001	17	Spala, Poland	6
2003	18	Esbjerg, Denmark	6
2005	19	Den Bosch, Netherlands	6
2007	20	Völklingen, Germany	6
2009	21	Milan, Italy	6
2011	22	Vantaa, Finland	6
2013	23	Ankara, Turkey	6
2015	24	Lubin, Poland	6
2017	25	Mulhouse, France	6
2018	26	Tallinn, Estonia	6
2020	27	Lahti, Finland	6
2022	28	Belgrade, Serbia	6
2024	29	Ibiza, Spain	6
2026	30	Tatabánya, Hungary	6

== Past winners ==
Year	Men's singles	Women's singles	Men's doubles	Women's doubles	Mixed doubles	Team
1969	(Denmark) Flemming Delfs	(Denmark) Anne Berglund	(England) Keit Arthur (England) Ray Stevens	(Netherlands) Joke van Beusekom (Netherlands) Marjan Luesken	(Sweden) Gert Perneklo (Sweden) Karin Lindqvist	—N/a
1971	(Netherlands) Rob Ridder	(Denmark) Anne Berglund	(England) Peter Gardner (England) John Stretch	(Denmark) Anne Berglund (Denmark) Lene Køppen	(England) Peter Gardner (England) Barbara Giles	—N/a
1973	(Denmark) Jesper Helledie	(Denmark) Mette Myhre	(Sweden) Stefan Karlsson (Sweden) Willy Nilson	(England) Ann Forest (England) Kathleen Whiting	(Denmark) Jesper Helledie (Denmark) Susanne Johansen	—N/a
1975	(Sweden) Bruno Wackfelt	(Denmark) Pia Nielsen	(Sweden) Bruno Wackfelt (Sweden) Goran Sterner	(Denmark) Lise Lotte Gottsche (Denmark) Lilli B. Pedersen	(England) Tim Stokes (England) Karen Puttick	Denmark
1977	(England) Andy Goode	(England) Karen Bridge	(Denmark) Jesper Toftlund (Denmark) Niels Christensen	(England) Karen Bridge (England) Karen Puttick	(England) Nigel Tier (England) Karen Puttick	England
1979	(Denmark) Jens Peter Nierhoff	(Denmark) Kirsten Larsen	(Sweden) Peter Isaksson (Sweden) Jan-Eric Antonsson	(England) Sally Leadbeater (England) Gillian Clark	(Denmark) Jens Peter Nierhoff (Denmark) Charlotte Pilgaard	Denmark
1981	(Denmark) Michael Kjeldsen	(England) Helen Troke	(Denmark) Michael Kjeldsen (Denmark) Mark Christiansen	(Denmark) Dorte Kjaer (Denmark) Nettie Nielsen	(England) Dipak Tailor (England) Mary Leeves	Denmark
1983	(Denmark) Claus Thomsen	(England) Helen Troke	(Wales) Chris Rees (Wales) Lyndon Williams	(England) Lisa Chapman (England) June Shipman	(Denmark) Anders Nielsen (Denmark) Gitte Paulsen	England
1985	(England) Matthew Smith	(Denmark) Lisbeth Stuer-Lauridsen	(Denmark) Jan Paulsen (Denmark) Lars Pedersen	(Denmark) Lisbeth Stuer-Lauridsen (Denmark) Lotte Olsen	(Denmark) Jan Paulsen (Denmark) Marian Christiansen	Denmark
1987	(Finland) Pontus Jantti	(Denmark) Helle Andersen	(Denmark) Michael Søgaard (Denmark) Jens Maibom	(Sweden) Catrine Bengtsson (Sweden) Margit Borg	(Denmark) Jens Maibom (Denmark) Charlotte Madsen	Denmark
1989	(Denmark) Thomas Stuer-Lauridsen	(Denmark) Camilla Martin	(Denmark) Thomas Stuer-Lauridsen (Denmark) Christian Jacobsen	(Denmark) Marlene Thomsen (Denmark) Trine Johansson	(Denmark) Christian Jacobsen (Denmark) Marlene Thomsen	Denmark
1991	(Austria) Jürgen Koch	(Denmark) Lotte Thomsen	(Denmark) Martin Lundgaard Hansen (Denmark) Peter Christensen	(Denmark) Trine Pedersen (Denmark) Mette Pedersen	(Denmark) Peter Christensen (Denmark) Rikke Broen	Soviet Union
1993	(Denmark) Jim Laugesen	(Denmark) Mette Sørensen	(Denmark) Jim Laugesen (Denmark) Janek Roos	(Denmark) Mette Sørensen (Denmark) Rikke Olsen	(Denmark) Thomas Stavngaard (Denmark) Sara Runesten	Denmark
1995	(Denmark) Peter Gade	(Netherlands) Brenda Beenhakker	(Denmark) Peter Gade (Denmark) Peder Nissen	(England) Joanne Wright (England) Donna Kellogg	(Denmark) Peder Nissen (Denmark) Mette Hansen	Denmark
1997	(Netherlands) Dicky Palyama	(Netherlands) Judith Meulendijks	(Denmark) Kasper Ødum (Denmark) Ove Svejstrup	(Denmark) Lene Mørk (Denmark) Jane Bramsen	(Denmark) Ove Svejstrup (Denmark) Britta Andersen	Denmark
1999	(Germany) Björn Joppien	(Germany) Petra Overzier	(Denmark) Mathias Boe (Denmark) Kasper Kim Jensen	(Germany) Petra Overzier (Germany) Anne Honscheid	(Denmark) Mathias Boe (Denmark) Karina Sørensen	Germany
2001	(Netherlands) Eric Pang	(Germany) Juliane Schenk	(Denmark) Carsten Mogensen (Denmark) Rasmus Andersen	(Poland) Kamila Augustyn (Belarus) Nadieżda Kostiuczyk	(Denmark) Rasmus Andersen (Denmark) Mette Nielsen	Germany
2003	(Germany) Marc Zwiebler	(Ukraine) Larisa Griga	(Denmark) Mikkel Delbo Larsen (Denmark) Martin Bille Larsen	(Russia) Nina Vislova (Russia) Valeria Sorokina	(Germany) Marc Zwiebler (Germany) Birgit Overzier	Germany
2005	(England) Rajiv Ouseph	(Germany) Janet Köhler	(Denmark) Rasmus Bonde (Denmark) Kasper Henriksen	(Russia) Nina Vislova (Russia) Olga Kozlova	(Denmark) Rasmus Bonde (Denmark) Christinna Pedersen	Denmark
2007	(Denmark) Mads Conrad-Petersen	(Denmark) Karina Jørgensen	(England) Peter Mills (England) Chris Adcock	(Czech Republic) Kristína Ludíková (Belarus) Olga Konon	(Denmark) Christian Larsen (Denmark) Joan Christiansen	England
2009	(Denmark) Emil Holst	(Denmark) Anne Hald Jensen	(France) Sylvain Grosjean (Republic of Ireland) Sam Magee	(Russia) Anastasia Chervaykova (Russia) Romina Gabdullina	(Netherlands) Jacco Arends (Netherlands) Selena Piek	Denmark
2011	(Denmark) Viktor Axelsen	(Spain) Carolina Marín	(England) Christopher Coles (England) Matthew Nottingham	(Denmark) Mette Poulsen (Denmark) Ditte Strunge Larsen	(Denmark) Kim Astrup Sørensen (Denmark) Line Kjaersfeldt	Germany
2013	(Germany) Fabian Roth	(Bulgaria) Stefani Stoeva	(Denmark) Oliver Babic (Denmark) Kasper Antonsen	(Bulgaria) Stefani Stoeva (Bulgaria) Gabriela Stoeva	(Denmark) David Daugaard (Denmark) Maiken Fruergaard	Denmark
2015	(Denmark) Anders Antonsen	(Denmark) Mia Blichfeldt	(Denmark) Alexander Bond (Denmark) Joel Eipe	(Denmark) Julie Dawall Jakobsen (Denmark) Ditte Søby Hansen	(Germany) Max Weißkirchen (Germany) Eva Janssens	Spain
2017	(France) Toma Junior Popov	(Denmark) Julie Dawall Jakobsen	(France) Thom Gicquel (France) Toma Junior Popov	(Sweden) Emma Karlsson (Sweden) Johanna Magnusson	(Russia) Rodion Alimov (Russia) Alina Davletova	France
2018	(France) Arnaud Merklé	(Denmark) Line Christophersen	(France) Fabien Delrue (France) William Villeger	(Turkey) Bengisu Erçetin (Turkey) Nazlıcan İnci	(France) Fabien Delrue (France) Juliette Moinard	France
2020	(France) Christo Popov	(Russia) Anastasiia Shapovalova	(Denmark) William Kryger Boe (Denmark) Mads Vestergaard	(Russia) Anastasiia Boiarun (Russia) Alena Iakovleva	(Germany) Matthias Kicklitz (Germany) Thuc Phuong Nguyen	Denmark
2022	(France) Alex Lanier	(Bulgaria) Kaloyana Nalbantova	(Denmark) Jakob Houe (Denmark) Christian Faust Kjær	(Spain) Nikol Carulla (Spain) Lucía Rodríguez	(France) Lucas Renoir (France) Tea Margueritte	Denmark
2024	(Poland) Mateusz Gołaś	(Bulgaria) Kaloyana Nalbantova	(France) Thibault Gardon (France) Tom Lalot Trescarte	(France) Elsa Jacob (France) Camille Pognante	(France) Thibault Gardon (France) Kathell Desmots-Chacun	Denmark
2026	(France) Mady Sow	(Ukraine) Raiia Almalalha	(Denmark) Sebastian Mønster Andersen (Denmark) Birk Norman	(Turkey) Elifnur Demir (Turkey) Zeynep Berre Ocakoğlu	(Turkey) Gökay Göl (Turkey) Nisa Nur Çimen	France

== Medal count (1969–2026 Individual) ==
Rank	Nation	Gold	Silver	Bronze	Total
1	Denmark	86	63.5	75	224.5
2	England	22	35	51	108
3	France	15.5	11	16	42.5
4	Germany	14	10	30	54
5	Sweden	7	16.5	35	58.5
6	Netherlands	7	12	26	45
7	Russia	6	10	24	40
8	Bulgaria	4	0	4	8
9	Spain	3	4	4	11
10	Turkey	3	1	11	15
11	Ukraine	2	1	4	7
12	Poland	1.5	2	8	11.5
13	Wales	1	2	0	3
14	Soviet Union	1	1	6	8
15	Finland	1	0	7	8
16	Belarus	1	0	1.5	2.5
17	Austria	1	0	1	2
18	Ireland	0.5	0	3	3.5
19	Czech Republic	0.5	0	2.5	3
20	Scotland	0	3	10	13
21	Norway	0	2	1	3
21	Switzerland	0	2	1	3
23	West Germany	0	1	4	5
24	Belgium	0	0	2	2
24	Estonia	0	0	2	2
24	Hungary	0	0	2	2
24	Serbia	0	0	2	2
28	East Germany	0	0	1	1
28	Portugal	0	0	1	1
28	Slovenia	0	0	1	1
28	Yugoslavia	0	0	1	1
Totals (31 entries)		177	177	337	691
