= Fyrishov =

Sports venue in Uppsala, Sweden

Coordinates: 59°52′15″N 17°37′25″E

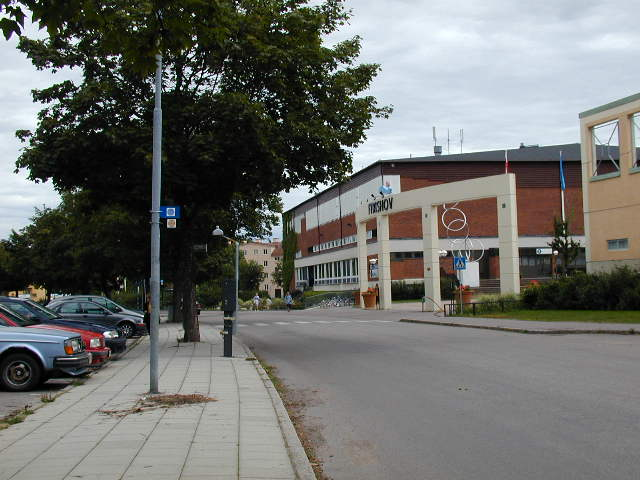
Fyrishov entrance

Fyrishov is a sporting facility in Uppsala, Sweden. It is Sweden's fourth most visited arena for swimming, sports events, meetings and recreation. The facilities include areas for indoor sports, summer sports and a water park with waterslides, 50-metre pool, training pool, relaxation area and an outdoor swimming pool. Fyrishov AB also operates the Gottsundabadet swimming pool with a 25-metre pool, a 10-metre children's pool and gym.

== Sporting Clubs ==
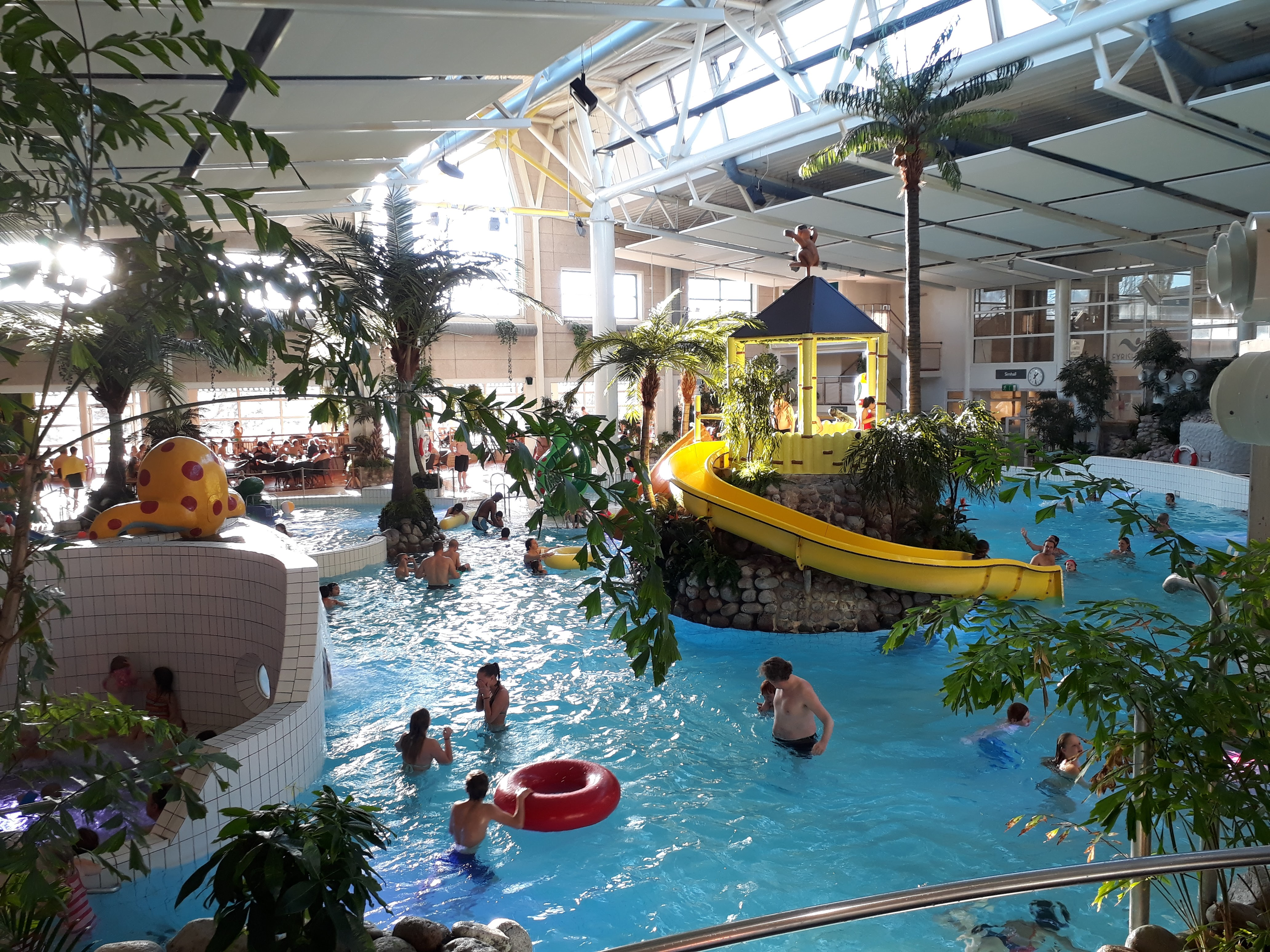
Water park

The facility is the home of Uppsala Basket (in the Swedish national basketball league), an athletic club, the fencing club Upsala Fäktning, Uppsala Judklubb (Sweden's oldest judo club), the Uppsala volleyball team, the Upsala tyngdlyftningsklubb weightlifting club and Upsala Simsällskap (one of the world's oldest swimming clubs). The facility is also home to Uppsala's two floorball teams in the Swedish Super League: Storvreta IBK (men's) and IK Sirius IBK (women's).

== Owners ==
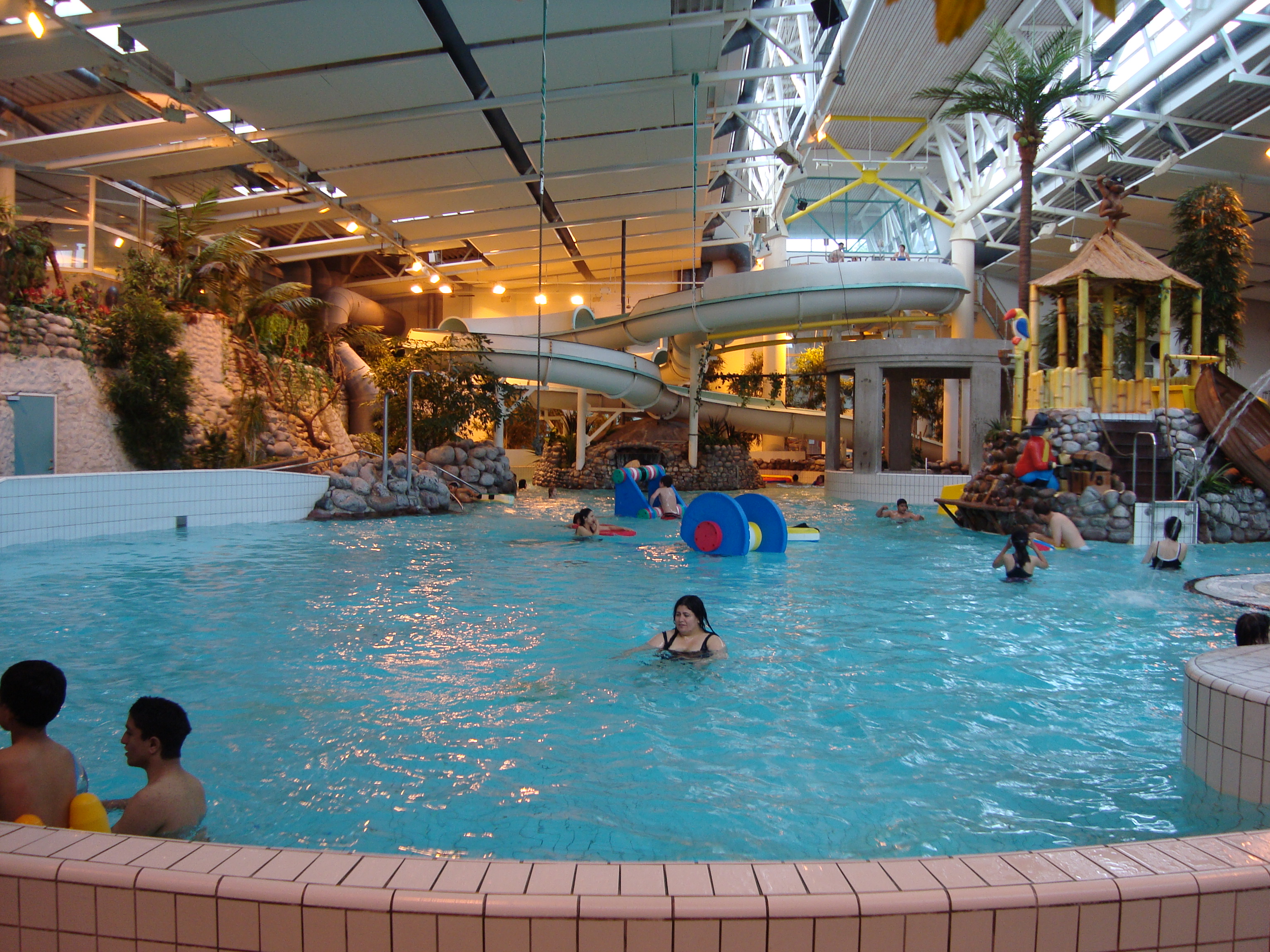
Swimming pool

Fyrishov is owned by the local government, Uppsala Municipality. A plan for a 500 million SEK renovation was announced in December 2020. The architecture company White Arkitekter was contracted to design the renovation.
