= Sporthalle (Böblingen) =

Indoor arena in Böblingen, Germany

Coordinates: 48°40′41.3″N 9°01′02.5″E

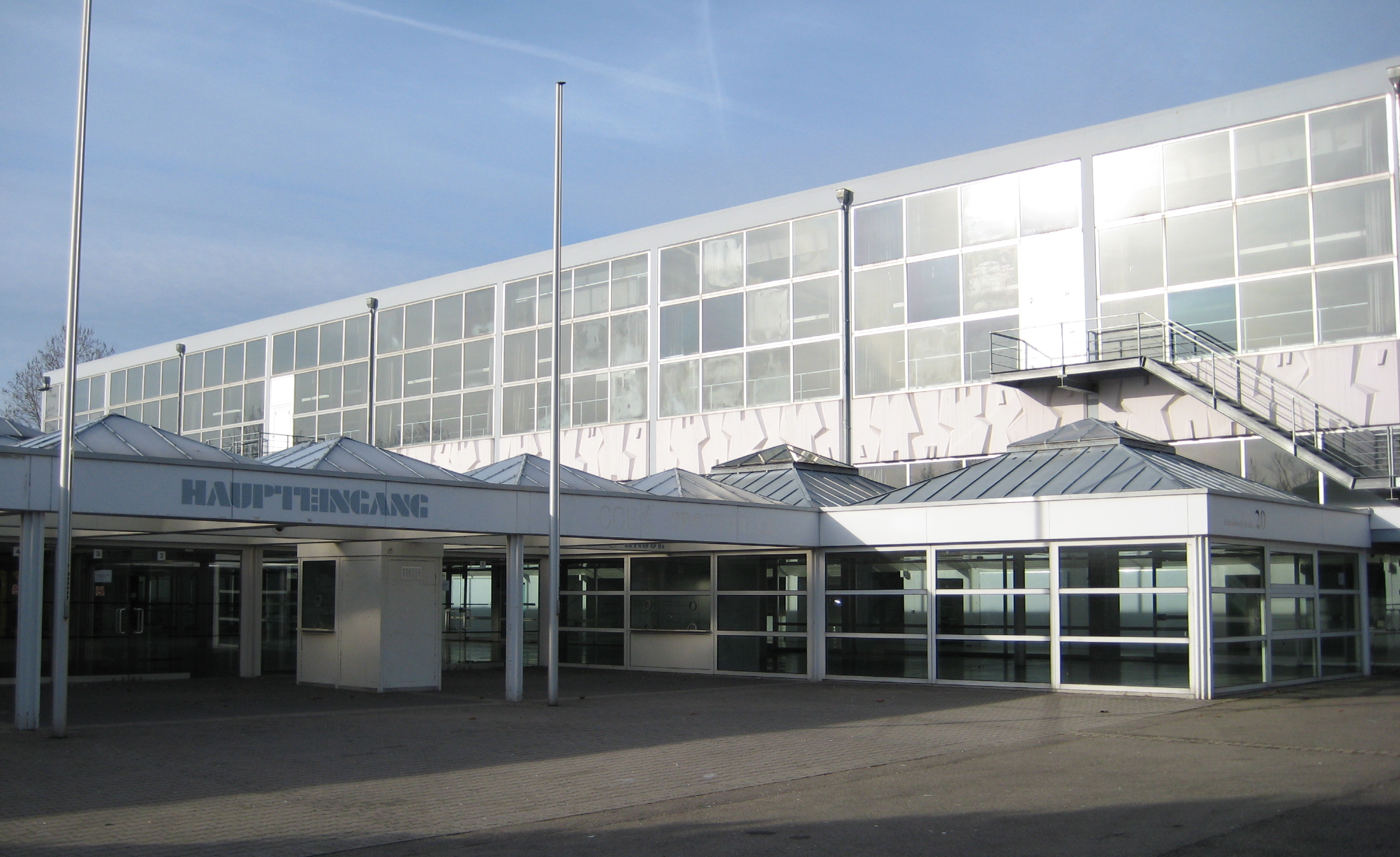

Sporthalle was an indoor sports arena located in Böblingen, Germany. It opened in 1966 and was demolished in 2008. Sporthalle had a capacity to hold 6,500 people.

The venue played host to six team handball competitions for the 1972 Summer Olympics in neighboring Munich.

Further, it served as one of two venues for the FIBA EuroBasket 1971.

It hosted indoor sporting events, trade shows, TV shows, music concerts and other events.
