= 1985 IBF World Championships – Mixed doubles =

Mixed doubles at the 1985 IBF World Championships
- Venue: Olympic Saddledome
- Location: Calgary, Canada
- Dates: June 10, 1985 – June 16, 1985

Medalists
gold medal	Park Joo-bong; Yoo Sang-hee	South Korea
silver medal	Stefan Karlsson; Maria Bengtsson	Sweden
bronze medal	Nigel Tier; Gillian Gowers	England
bronze medal	Zhang Xinguang; Lao Yujing	China

The 1985 IBF World Championships (World Badminton Championships) were held in Calgary, Canada, from June 10 to June 16, 1985. Following the results of the mixed doubles.

== Qualification ==
- (England) Andy Goode/Gillian Clark- (South Korea) Lee Deuk-choon/Kang Haeng-suk: 15:13, 15:5
- (Japan) Shūji Matsuno/Michiko Tomita- (Mozambique) Sozinho Guerra/Indira Bhikha: 15:2, 15:3
- (South Korea) Sung Han-kook/Hwang Hye-young- (Germany) Rolf Rüsseler/Heidi Krickhaus: 15:8, 15:0
- (South Korea) Kim Moon-soo/Chung So-young- (New Zealand) Graeme Robson/Toni Whittaker: 15:13, 15:7
- (India) Leroy D'sa/Madhumita Bisht- (United States) Bob Gilmour/Barbara McKinley: 15:12, 15:8
- (India) Pradeep Gandhe/Ami Ghia- (Iceland) Broddi Kristjansson/Thordis Ewald: 15:7, 15:6
- (Scotland) Dan Travers/Pamela Hamilton- (Nigeria) Samson Egbeyemi/A. Onuoha: 15:7, 15:2
- (South Korea) Park Joo-bong/Yoo Sang-hee- (Zambia) S. Gondwe/Mary Mukangwa: w.o.
- (Japan) Shinji Matsuura/Kimiko Jinnai- (France) Benoît Pitte/Anne Meniane: 15:1, 15:5
- (Sweden) Ulf Johansson/ (Scotland) Gillian Martin- (United States) P. Baum/Dawn Race: 18:15, 15:11
- (Canada) Bob MacDougall/Denyse Julien- (Peru) Armando del Carpio/Carmen Bellido: 15:4, 15:4

== Main stage ==
=== Section 1 ===
First round
(England) Martin Dew (England) Gillian Gilks	15	15
(Canada) Mike Butler (Canada) Claire Backhouse	9	1
(Scotland) Dan Travers (Scotland) Pamela Hamilton	15	15
(India) Pradeep Gandhe (India) Ami Ghia	2	10
(United States) Kevin Hussey (United States) Linda French	4	5
(Denmark) Jesper Helledie (Denmark) Dorte Kjaer	15	15
(South Korea) Park Joo-bong (South Korea) Yoo Sang-hee	15	15
(Hong Kong) Chan Chi Choi (Hong Kong) Amy Chan	6	5
(Nigeria) Benjamin Orakpo (Nigeria) Bridget Ibenero	1	0
(England) Nigel Tier (England) Gillian Gowers	15	15
(Japan) Shinji Matsuura (Japan) Kimiko Jinnai	11	15	14
(South Korea) Sung Han-kook (South Korea) Hwang Hye-young	15	11	17
(China) Jiang Guoliang (China) Lin Ying	15	15
(Peru) Federico Valdez (Peru) Silvia Jimenez	3	5
(Sweden) Ulf Johansson (Scotland) Gillian Martin	3	5
(Sweden) Thomas Kihlström (Sweden) Christine Magnusson	15	15

Second round
(England) Martin Dew (England) Gillian Gilks	15	15
(Scotland) Dan Travers (Scotland) Pamela Hamilton	10	4
(Denmark) Jesper Helledie (Denmark) Dorte Kjaer	8	8
(South Korea) Park Joo-bong (South Korea) Yoo Sang-hee	15	15
(England) Nigel Tier (England) Gillian Gowers	15	15
(South Korea) Sung Han-kook (South Korea) Hwang Hye-young	8	12
(China) Jiang Guoliang (China) Lin Ying	15	15	7
(Sweden) Thomas Kihlström (Sweden) Christine Magnusson	5	18	15

Quarterfinals
(England) Martin Dew (England) Gillian Gilks	6	15	10
(South Korea) Park Joo-bong (South Korea) Yoo Sang-hee	15	0	15
(England) Nigel Tier (England) Gillian Gowers	3	18	10
(Sweden) Thomas Kihlström (Sweden) Christine Magnusson	15	15	10

Semi finals
(South Korea) Park Joo-bong (South Korea) Yoo Sang-hee	15	15
(England) Nigel Tier (England) Gillian Gowers	4	8

=== Section 2 ===
First round
(England) Andy Goode (England) Gillian Clark	15	15
(Japan) Shūji Matsuno (Japan) Michiko Tomita	4	10
(Scotland) Billy Gilliland (Scotland) Aileen Nairn	15	15
(United States) Brent Cutcliffe (United States) Monica Pontow	4	3
(Canada) Bob MacDougall (Canada) Denyse Julien	11	11
(China) Zhang Xinguang (China) Lao Yujing	15	15
(Germany) Harald Klauer (Australia) Julie McDonald	15	4	0
(Denmark) Steen Fladberg (Denmark) Gitte Paulsen	5	15	15
w.o.
(India) Leroy D'Sa (India) Madhumita Bisht
(Scotland) Alex White (Australia) Maxine Evans	3	9
(Sweden) Stefan Karlsson (Sweden) Maria Bengtsson	15	15
(South Korea) Kim Moon-soo (South Korea) Chung So-young	15	15
(Peru) Gustavo Salazar (Peru) Gloria Jimenez	2	4
(Canada) Peter Rawlek (Canada) Sandra Stapleton	4	2
(England) Dipak Tailor (England) Nora Perry	15	15

Second round
(England) Andy Goode (England) Gillian Clark	15	15
(Scotland) Billy Gilliland (Scotland) Aileen Nairn	2	9
(China) Zhang Xinguang (China) Lao Yujing	4	15	15
(Denmark) Steen Fladberg (Denmark) Gitte Paulsen	15	2	5
(India) Leroy D'Sa (India) Madhumita Bisht	5	7
(Sweden) Stefan Karlsson (Sweden) Maria Bengtsson	15	15
(South Korea) Kim Moon-soo (South Korea) Chung So-young	8	0
(England) Dipak Tailor (England) Nora Perry	15	15

Quarterfinals
(England) Andy Goode (England) Gillian Clark	0	4
(China) Zhang Xinguang (China) Lao Yujing	15	15
(Sweden) Stefan Karlsson (Sweden) Maria Bengtsson	17	15
(England) Dipak Tailor (England) Nora Perry	16	6

Semi finals
(China) Zhang Xinguang (China) Lao Yujing	15	4	9
(Sweden) Stefan Karlsson (Sweden) Maria Bengtsson	12	15	15

== Final stage ==
Quarterfinals
1	(England) Martin Dew (England) Gillian Gilks	6	15	10
8	(South Korea) Park Joo-bong (South Korea) Yoo Sang-hee	15	0	15
4	(England) Nigel Tier (England) Gillian Gowers	3	18	15
5	(Sweden) Thomas Kihlström (Sweden) Christine Magnusson	15	15	10
3	(England) Andy Goode (England) Gillian Clark	0	4
6	(China) Zhang Xinguang (China) Lao Yujing	15	15
2	(Sweden) Stefan Karlsson (Sweden) Maria Bengtsson	17	15
7	(England) Dipak Tailor (England) Nora Perry	16	6

Semifinals
(South Korea) Park Joo-bong (South Korea) Yoo Sang-hee	15	15
(England) Nigel Tier (England) Gillian Gowers	4	8
(China) Zhang Xinguang (China) Lao Yujing	15	4	9
(Sweden) Stefan Karlsson (Sweden) Maria Bengtsson	12	15	15

Finals
(South Korea) Park Joo-bong (South Korea) Yoo Sang-hee	15	12	15
(Sweden) Stefan Karlsson (Sweden) Maria Bengtsson	10	15	12
