= Nettie Nielsen =

Danish badminton player

Personal information
- Full name: Nettie Hyldborg Nielsen
- Born: 23 July 1964 (age 62) Roskilde, Sjælland, Denmark

Sport
- Country: Denmark
- Sport: Badminton
- Handedness: Right
Medal record
Women's badminton
Representing Denmark
World Cup
Bronze medal – third place	1988 Bangkok	Women's doubles
Bronze medal – third place	1991 Macau	Women's doubles
Sudirman Cup
Bronze medal – third place	1989 Jakarta	Mixed team
Bronze medal – third place	1991 Copenhagen	Mixed team
European Championships
Gold medal – first place	1988 Kristiansand	Women's doubles
Gold medal – first place	1986 Uppsala	Mixed team
Gold medal – first place	1988 Kristiansand	Mixed team
Gold medal – first place	1990 Moscow	Women's doubles
Gold medal – first place	1990 Moscow	Mixed team
Silver medal – second place	1986 Uppsala	Women's doubles
Bronze medal – third place	1982 Böblingen	Women's doubles
Bronze medal – third place	1982 Böblingen	Mixed team
European Junior Championships
Gold medal – first place	1981 Edinburgh	Girls' doubles
Gold medal – first place	1981 Edinburgh	Mixed team
Silver medal – second place	1981 Edinburgh	Girls' singles

Nettie Hyldborg Nielsen (born 23 July 1964) is a retired female badminton player from Denmark.

== European & Danish titles ==
Nielsen won the gold medal at the 1988 and 1990 European Badminton Championships in women's doubles with Dorte Kjaer. She took a silver medal in the girls singles event at the European Junior Badminton Championships in 1981. Together with compatriot Dorte Kjaer she won the European juniors girls doubles title in 1981. In 1983 they became the Danish National ladies doubles champions for the first time. Together they won the Danish National Badminton Championships a total of six times (1983, 1985, 1986, 1987, 1988 & 1990).

== Other International titles ==
Nettie Nielsen won the ladies singles title of the German Open in 1983.

Nettie Nielsen and Dorte Kjaer won a bronze medal in Women's doubles at the 1988 Summer Olympics in Seoul when badminton was an exhibition sport. Nettie Nielsen was the Nordic ladies singles champion in 1982. She also won the Nordic badminton Championships in Women's doubles in 1982, 1984, 1985, 1986, 1987 and 1988 with Dorte Kjaer. Together they won the Scottish Open twice in 1985 & 1986. Nettie Nielsen won her first big Open title in mixed doubles with Morten Frost in 1983 at the Scottish Open. With Jesper Knudsen she won the Nordic badminton mixed doubles titles in 1987 & 1988 and Grand Prix titles at the Dutch Open in 1988 and Danish Opens in 1988 and 1989. They were also runners-up in the mixed doubles at the All England Open 1988.

== Achievements ==
=== World Cup ===
Women's doubles
Year	Venue	Partner	Opponent	Score	Result
1988	National Stadium, Bangkok, Thailand	(Denmark) Dorte Kjaer	(China) Lin Ying (China) Guan Weizhen	15–12, 1–15, 5–15	Bronze
1991	Macau Forum, Macau	(England) Gillian Clark	(South Korea) Chung So-young (South Korea) Hwang Hye-young	5–15, 16–18	Bronze

=== European Championships ===
Women's doubles
Year	Venue	Partner	Opponent	Score	Result
1982	Sporthalle, Böblingen, West Germany	(Denmark) Dorte Kjaer	(England) Jane Webster (England) Nora Perry	9–15, 17–14, 11–15	Bronze
1986	Fyrishallen, Uppsala, Sweden	(Denmark) Dorte Kjaer	(England) Gillian Clark (England) Gillian Gowers	11–15, 12–15	Silver
1988	Badmintonsenteret, Kristiansand, Norway	(Denmark) Dorte Kjaer	(England) Gillian Clark (England) Julie Munday	15–7, 15–4	Gold
1990	Luzhniki Small Sports Arena, Moscow, Soviet Union	(Denmark) Dorte Kjaer	(Netherlands) Eline Coene (Netherlands) Erica Van Dijck	15–5, 15–6	Gold

=== European Junior Championships ===
Girls' singles
Year	Venue	Opponent	Score	Result
1981	Meadowbank Sports Centre, Edinburgh, Scotland	(England) Helen Troke	11–8, 9–12, 6–11	Silver

Girls' doubles
Year	Venue	Partner	Opponent	Score	Result
1981	Meadowbank Sports Centre, Edinburgh, Scotland	(Denmark) Dorte Kjaer	(Sweden) Christine Magnusson (Sweden) Maria Bengtsson	18–15, 15–10	Gold

=== IBF World Grand Prix ===
The World Badminton Grand Prix sanctioned by International Badminton Federation (IBF) since 1983.

Women's singles
Year	Tournament	Opponent	Score	Result
1983	Dutch Open	(England) Sally Podger	7–11, 3–11	(silver) Runner-up
1983	German Open	(Denmark) Kirsten Larsen	11–12, 11–3, 11–4	(gold) Winner

Women's doubles
Year	Tournament	Partner	Opponent	Score	Result
1985	Scottish Open	(Denmark) Dorte Kjær	(Sweden) Maria Bengtsson (Sweden) Christine Magnussen	15–13, 15–8	(gold) Winner
1986	Scottish Open	(Denmark) Dorte Kjær	(England) Gillian Clark (England) Gillian Gowers	15–8, 15–11	(gold) Winner
1986	Carlton-Intersport-Cup	(Denmark) Dorte Kjær	(England) Gillian Clark (England) Gillian Gowers	9–15, 11–15	(silver) Runner-up
1987	Malaysia Open	(Denmark) Dorte Kjær	(China) Lin Ying (China) Guan Weizhen	2–15, 1–15	(silver) Runner-up
1987	English Masters	(Denmark) Dorte Kjær	(England) Gillian Clark (England) Gillian Gowers	15–8, 15–12	(gold) Winner
1988	Poona Open	(Denmark) Dorte Kjær	(South Korea) Yoo Sang-hee (South Korea) Kim Yun-ja	12–15, 2–15	(silver) Runner-up
1988	Dutch Open	(Denmark) Dorte Kjær	(England) Gillian Clark (England) Sara Sankey	15–9, 9–15, 6–15	(silver) Runner-up
1988	Denmark Open	(Denmark) Dorte Kjær	(China) Lin Ying (China) Guan Weizhen	3–15, 12–15	(silver) Runner-up
1989	World Grand Prix Finals	(Denmark) Dorte Kjær	(Indonesia) Rosiana Tendean (Indonesia) Erma Sulistianingsih	15–11, 16–18, 16–18	(silver) Runner-up
1990	Dutch Open	(Denmark) Lisbet Stuer-Lauridsen	(Sweden) Maria Bengtsson (Sweden) Christine Magnussen	15–9, 15–11	(gold) Winner
1991	Denmark Open	(England) Gillian Gowers	(Indonesia) Finarsih (Indonesia) Lili Tampi	15–7, 15–6	(gold) Winner
1991	Swedish Open	(England) Gillian Clark	(Sweden) Maria Bengtsson (Sweden) Catrine Bengtsson	13–15, 15–9, 15–10	(gold) Winner
1991	Finnish Open	(England) Gillian Clark	(China) Pan Li (China) Wu Yuhong	15–9, 14–17, 15–11	(gold) Winner
1991	Malaysia Open	(England) Gillian Clark	(South Korea) Hwang Hye-young (South Korea) Chung So-young	10–15, 11–15	(silver) Runner-up

Mixed doubles
Year	Tournament	Partner	Opponent	Score	Result
1986	Denmark Open	(Denmark) Jesper Knudsen	(England) Martin Dew (England) Gillian Gilks	10–15, 11–15	(silver) Runner-up
1986	Scottish Open	(Denmark) Jesper Knudsen	(England) Andy Goode (England) Fiona Elliott	15–9, 3–15, 8–15	(silver) Runner-up
1987	English Masters	(Denmark) Jesper Knudsen	(England) Richard Outterside (England) Karen Chapman	14–18, 15–9, 15–9	(gold) Winner
1988	All England Open	(Denmark) Jesper Knudsen	(China) Wang Pengren (China) Shi Fangjing	9–15, 13–18	(silver) Runner-up
1988	English Masters	(Denmark) Jesper Knudsen	(Denmark) Steen Fladberg (England) Gillian Clark	15–11, 15–6	(gold) Winner
1988	Dutch Open	(Denmark) Jesper Knudsen	(Denmark) Henrik Svarrer (Denmark) Dorte Kjær	15–7, 15–11	(gold) Winner
1988	Denmark Open	(Denmark) Jesper Knudsen	(Indonesia) Rudy Gunawan (Indonesia) Lilik Sudarwati	15–7, 15–4	(gold) Winner
1989	Denmark Open	(Denmark) Jesper Knudsen	(Sweden) Pär-Gunnar Jönsson (Sweden) Maria Bengtsson	15–6, 15–6	(gold) Winner
1990	Scottish Open	(Denmark) Jesper Knudsen	(Denmark) Jon Holst-Christensen (Denmark) Grete Mogensen	2–15, 13–15	(silver) Runner-up

=== IBF International ===
Women's singles
Year	Tournament	Opponent	Score	Result
1981	Nordic Championships	(Denmark) Lene Køppen	12–9, 1–11, 3–11	(silver) Runner-up
1982	Nordic Championships	(Denmark) Kirsten Larsen	12–9, 11–6	(gold) Winner

Women's doubles
Year	Tournament	Partner	Opponent	Score	Result
1981	Nordic Championships	(Denmark) Dorte Kjær	(Denmark) Lene Køppen (Denmark) Pia Nielsen	13–15, 14–17	(silver) Runner-up
1982	Dutch Open	(Denmark) Dorte Kjær	(England) Gillian Gilks (England) Gillian Clark	18–16, 9–15, 12–15	(silver) Runner-up
1982	Nordic Championships	(Denmark) Dorte Kjær	(Sweden) Maria Bengtsson (Sweden) Christine Magnusson	15–5, 15–9	(gold) Winner
1984	Nordic Championships	(Denmark) Dorte Kjær	(Sweden) Maria Bengtsson (Sweden) Christine Magnusson	15–7, 14–17, 15–10	(gold) Winner
1985	Nordic Championships	(Denmark) Dorte Kjær	(Sweden) Maria Bengtsson (Sweden) Christine Magnusson	15–4, 16–18, 15–13	(gold) Winner
1985	Welsh International	(Denmark) Hanne Adsbøl	(England) Karen Beckman (England) Sara Halsall	7–15, 12–15	(silver) Runner-up
1986	Nordic Championships	(Denmark) Dorte Kjær	(Sweden) Maria Bengtsson (Sweden) Christine Magnusson	15–8, 15–11	(gold) Winner
1987	Nordic Championships	(Denmark) Dorte Kjær	(Sweden) Maria Bengtsson (Sweden) Christine Magnusson	11–15, 15–4, 15–4	(gold) Winner
1988	Nordic Championships	(Denmark) Dorte Kjær	(Sweden) Maria Bengtsson (Sweden) Catrine Bengtsson	14–18, 15–4, 15–8	(gold) Winner
1990	Nordic Championships	(Denmark) Lisbet Stuer-Lauridsen	(Denmark) Dorte Kjær (Denmark) Lotte Olsen	8–15, 7–15	(silver) Runner-up

Mixed doubles
Year	Tournament	Partner	Opponent	Score	Result
1983	Scottish Open	(Denmark) Morten Frost	(Netherlands) Rob Ridder (Netherlands) Marjan Ridder	15–9, 6–15, 15–12	(gold) Winner
1985	Welsh International	(Denmark) Jesper Knudsen	(Denmark) Kim Brodersen (Denmark) Hanne Adsbøl	15–6, 15–12	(gold) Winner
1987	Nordic Championships	(Denmark) Jesper Knudsen	(Denmark) Peter Buch (Denmark) Grete Mogensen	15–5, 15–6	(gold) Winner
1988	Nordic Championships	(Denmark) Jesper Knudsen	(Sweden) Jan-Eric Antonsson (Sweden) Maria Bengtsson	15–11, 16–17, 15–10	(gold) Winner
