= Gillian Gowers =

British badminton player (born 1964)

Personal information
- Full name: Gillian Carol Gowers
- Born: 9 April 1964 (age 62) Horfield, Bristol, England
- Height: 157 cm (5 ft 2 in)
- Weight: 55 kg (121 lb)

Sport
- Country: England
- Sport: Badminton
- Handedness: Right
- Event: Women's singles and doubles, Mixed doubles
Medal record
Women's badminton
Representing England
World Championships
Bronze medal – third place	1985 Calgary	Mixed doubles
World Cup
Gold medal – first place	1993 New Delhi	Mixed doubles
Silver medal – second place	1990 Bandung-Jakarta	Mixed doubles
Silver medal – second place	1992 Guangzhou	Mixed doubles
Silver medal – second place	1992 Guangzhou	Women's doubles
Bronze medal – third place	1987 Kuala Lumpur	Mixed doubles
Bronze medal – third place	1988 Bangkok	Mixed doubles
Uber Cup
Silver medal – second place	1984 Kuala Lumpur	Women's team
Commonwealth Games
Gold medal – first place	1986 Edinburgh	Mixed team
Gold medal – first place	1986 Edinburgh	Women's doubles
Gold medal – first place	1990 Auckland	Mixed team
Silver medal – second place	1990 Auckland	Women's doubles
European Championships
Gold medal – first place	1986 Uppsala	Women's doubles
Silver medal – second place	1986 Uppsala	Mixed doubles
Silver medal – second place	1986 Uppsala	Mixed team
Bronze medal – third place	1990 Moscow	Women's doubles
Bronze medal – third place	1992 Glasgow	Women's doubles
Bronze medal – third place	1990 Moscow	Mixed doubles
Bronze medal – third place	1990 Moscow	Mixed team
Bronze medal – third place	1992 Glasgow	Mixed team
European Junior Championships
Silver medal – second place	1981 Edinburgh	Mixed team
Bronze medal – third place	1981 Edinburgh	Mixed doubles

Gillian Carol Gowers (born 9 April 1964, in Horfield) is an English retired badminton player.

== Badminton career ==
=== World Championships ===
She won the bronze medal at the 1985 IBF World Championships in mixed doubles with Nigel Tier.

=== Olympic Games ===
Gowers participated in the 1992 Barcelona Summer Olympics for Great Britain.

=== Commonwealth Games ===
She represented England and won double gold medal in the team event and the women's doubles with Gillian Clark, at the 1986 Commonwealth Games in Edinburgh, Scotland. She also participated in the singles and mixed doubles.

Four years later she represented England again and won another gold medal in the team event but had to settle for a silver medal in the women's doubles with Clark, at the 1990 Commonwealth Games in Auckland, New Zealand.

== Achievements ==
=== World Championships ===
Mixed doubles
Year	Venue	Partner	Opponent	Score	Result
1985	Olympic Saddledome, Calgary, Canada	(England) Nigel Tier	(South Korea) Park Joo-bong (South Korea) Yoo Sang-hee	4–15, 8–15	Bronze

=== World Cup ===
Women's doubles
Year	Venue	Partner	Opponent	Score	Result
1992	Guangdong Gymnasium, Guangzhou, China	(England) Sara Sankey	(China) Lin Yanfen (China) Yao Fen	0–15, 3–15	Silver

Mixed doubles
Year	Venue	Partner	Opponent	Score	Result
1987	Stadium Negara, Kuala Lumpur, Malaysia	(Denmark) Jan Paulsen	(China) Wang Pengren (China) Shi Fangjing	10–15, 7–15	Bronze
1988	National Stadium, Bangkok, Thailand	(England) Andy Goode	(China) Wang Pengren (China) Shi Fangjing	6–15, 12–15	Bronze
1990	Istora Senayan, Jakarta, Indonesia	(Denmark) Jan Paulsen	(Indonesia) Rudy Gunawan (Indonesia) Rosiana Tendean	15–11, 9–15, 3–15	Silver
1992	Guangzhou Gymnasium, Guangzhou, China	(Denmark) Jan Paulsen	(Indonesia) Rudy Gunawan (Indonesia) Rosiana Tendean	15–17, 9–15	Silver
1993	Indira Gandhi Arena, New Delhi, India	(Sweden) Peter Axelsson	(Indonesia) Aryono Miranat (Indonesia) Eliza Nathanael	10–15, 15–7, 15–5	Gold

=== Commonwealth Games ===
Women's doubles
Year	Venue	Partner	Opponent	Score	Result
1986	Meadowbank Sports Centre; Edinburgh, Scotland	(England) Gillian Clark	(Canada) Denyse Julien (Canada) Johanne Falardeau	15–6, 15–7	Gold
1990	Auckland Badminton Hall; Auckland, New Zealand	(England) Gillian Clark	(England) Fiona Smith (England) Sara Sankey	14–18, 15–2, 9–15	Silver

=== European Championships ===
Women's doubles
Year	Venue	Partner	Opponent	Score	Result
1986	Fyrishallen, Uppsala, Sweden	(England) Gillian Clark	(Denmark) Dorte Kjær (Denmark) Nettie Nielsen	15–11, 15–12	Gold
1990	Luzhniki, Moscow, Soviet Union	(England) Gillian Clark	(Netherlands) Eline Coene (Netherlands) Erica van Dijck	10–15, 15–11, 15–17	Bronze
1992	Kelvin Hall, Glasgow, Scotland	(England) Sara Sankey	(Sweden) Lim Xiaoqing (Sweden) Christine Magnusson	5–15, 15–17	Bronze

Mixed doubles
Year	Venue	Partner	Opponent	Score	Result
1986	Fyrishallen, Uppsala, Sweden	(England) Nigel Tier	(England) Martin Dew (England) Gillian Gilks	6–15, 8–15	Silver
1990	Luzhniki; Moscow, Soviet Union	(Denmark) Jan Paulsen	(Denmark) Jon Holst-Christensen (Denmark) Grete Mogensen	15–8, 14–18, 9–15	Bronze

=== European Junior Championships ===
Mixed doubles
Year	Venue	Partner	Opponent	Score	Result
1981	Meadowbank Sports Centre, Edinburgh, Scotland	(England) Chris Dobson	(Denmark) Mark Christiansen (Denmark) Dorte Kjær	15–11, 15–17, 3–15	Bronze

=== IBF World Grand Prix (37 titles, 56 runners-up) ===
The World Badminton Grand Prix was sanctioned by the International Badminton Federation (IBF) from 1983 to 2006.

Women's singles
Year	Tournament	Opponent	Score	Result
1984	Scottish Open	(England) Sally Podger	7–11, 5–11	(silver) Runner-up
1985	Malaysia Open	(England) Helen Troke	walkover	(gold) Winner
1985	English Masters	(Denmark) Kirsten Larsen	5–11, 0–11	(silver) Runner-up

Women's doubles
Year	Tournament	Partner	Opponent	Score	Result
1984	Thailand Open	(England) Helen Troke	(England) Gillian Gilks (England) Karen Beckman	16–18, 18–17, 9–15	(silver) Runner-up
1984	Canada Open	(England) Karen Chapman	(China) Chen Hong (China) Luo Yun	15–5, 15–9	(gold) Winner
1985	Dutch Open	(England) Gillian Clark	(Netherlands) Eline Coene (Netherlands) Erica van Dijck	15–4, 15–2	(gold) Winner
1985	Malaysia Open	(England) Gillian Clark	(Indonesia) Verawaty Fadjrin (Indonesia) Dwi Elmyati	15–10, 15–11	(gold) Winner
1985	India Open	(England) Gillian Clark	(South Korea) Hwang Sun-ae (South Korea) Kang Haeng-suk	7–15, 12–15	(silver) Runner-up
1985	English Masters	(England) Gillian Clark	(England) Karen Beckman (England) Sara Sankey	11–15, 5–15	(silver) Runner-up
1986	Dutch Open	(England) Helen Troke	(Netherlands) Eline Coene (Netherlands) Erica van Dijck	18–15, 15–9	(gold) Winner
1986	Carlton-Intersport-Cup	(England) Gillian Clark	(Denmark) Dorte Kjær (Denmark) Nettie Nielsen	15–9, 15–11	(gold) Winner
1986	Denmark Open	(England) Gillian Clark	(China) Zheng Yuli (China) Gu Jiaming	9–15, 18–15, 17–16	(gold) Winner
1986	English Masters	(England) Gillian Clark	(Sweden) Maria Bengtsson (Sweden) Christine Magnusson	5–15, 11–15	(silver) Runner-up
1987	Poona Open	(England) Gillian Clark	(Indonesia) Sarwendah Kusumawardhani (Indonesia) Erma Sulistianingsih	15–3, 15–5	(gold) Winner
1987	German Open	(England) Gillian Clark	(China) Lin Ying (China) Guan Weizhen	6–15, 10–15	(silver) Runner-up
1987	English Masters	(England) Gillian Clark	(Denmark) Dorte Kjær (Denmark) Nettie Nielsen	8–15, 12–15	(silver) Runner-up
1987	Denmark Open	(England) Gillian Clark	(Japan) Atsuko Tokuda (Japan) Yoshiko Yonekura	7–15, 10–15	(silver) Runner-up
1987	Scottish Open	(England) Helen Troke	(England) Fiona Elliott (England) Sara Halsall	11–15, 15–3, 15–12	(gold) Winner
1988	Chinese Taipei Open	(England) Gillian Clark	(Sweden) Maria Bengtsson (Sweden) Christine Magnusson	15–6, 6–15, 6–15	(silver) Runner-up
1988	Japan Open	(England) Gillian Clark	(South Korea) Chung Myung-hee (South Korea) Chung So-young	2–15, 15–7, 6–15	(silver) Runner-up
1988	German Open	(England) Gillian Clark	(China) Lao Yujing (China) Zheng Yuli	8–15, 15–3, 4–15	(silver) Runner-up
1989	German Open	(England) Gillian Clark	(Indonesia) Erma Sulistianingsih (Indonesia) Rosiana Tendean	15–10, 2–15, 9–15	(silver) Runner-up
1989	Dutch Open	(England) Gillian Clark	(Denmark) Pernille Dupont (Denmark) Grete Mogensen	11–15, 9–15	(silver) Runner-up
1989	Denmark Open	(England) Gillian Clark	(China) Lin Ying (China) Guan Weizhen	1–15, 3–15	(silver) Runner-up
1989	Scottish Open	(England) Gillian Clark	(England) Karen Chapman (England) Sara Sankey	15–10, 15–6	(gold) Winner
1990	Chinese Taipei Open	(England) Gillian Clark	(South Korea) Chun Sung-suk (South Korea) Shim Eun-jung	15–3, 15–6	(gold) Winner
1990	Finnish Open	(England) Gillian Clark	(Sweden) Maria Bengtsson (Sweden) Christine Magnusson	12–15, 12–15	(silver) Runner-up
1990	All England Open	(England) Gillian Clark	(South Korea) Chung Myung-hee (South Korea) Hwang Hye-young	15–6, 4–15, 4–15	(silver) Runner-up
1990	Singapore Open	(England) Gillian Clark	(Sweden) Maria Bengtsson (Sweden) Christine Magnusson	15–12, 15–13	(gold) Winner
1990	Denmark Open	(England) Gillian Clark	(Denmark) Dorte Kjær (Denmark) Lotte Olsen	13–15, 15–9, 11–15	(silver) Runner-up
1990	Scottish Open	(England) Gillian Clark	(Sweden) Catrine Bengtsson (Sweden) Maria Bengtsson	16–18, 11–15	(silver) Runner-up
1991	Japan Open	(England) Gillian Clark	(China) Guan Weizhen (China) Nong Qunhua	6–15, 18–15, 15–9	(gold) Winner
1991	Canada Open	(England) Sara Sankey	(South Korea) Kang Bok-seung (South Korea) Shim Eun-jung	12–15, 15–12, 17–15	(gold) Winner
1991	Dutch Open	(England) Sara Sankey	(Sweden) Catrine Bengtsson (Sweden) Maria Bengtsson	15–9, 18–16	(gold) Winner
1991	Denmark Open	(Denmark) Nettie Nielsen	(Indonesia) Finarsih (Indonesia) Lili Tampi	15–7, 15–6	(gold) Winner
1992	Indonesia Open	(England) Gillian Clark	(Indonesia) Erma Sulistianingsih (Indonesia) Rosiana Tendean	12–15, 9–15	(silver) Runner-up
1992	Singapore Open	(England) Gillian Clark	(China) Chen Ying (China) Sheng Wenqing	16–18, 15–4, 15–8	(gold) Winner
1992	World Grand Prix Finals	(England) Gillian Clark	(China) Lin Yanfen (China) Yao Fen	7–15, 16–17	(silver) Runner-up
1995	Chinese Taipei Open	(Denmark) Lisbet Stuer-Lauridsen	(Denmark) Helene Kirkegaard (Denmark) Rikke Olsen	5–15, 5–15	(silver) Runner-up
1996	Scottish Open	(England) Joanne Goode	(China) Liu Lu (China) Qian Hong	15–8, 3–15, 5–15	(silver) Runner-up

Mixed doubles
Year	Tournament	Partner	Opponent	Score	Result
1984	Scottish Open	(Scotland) Billy Gilliland	(England) Duncan Bridge (England) Sara Leeves	15–8, 15–7	(gold) Winner
1984	Dutch Open	(Scotland) Billy Gilliland	(England) Martin Dew (England) Gillian Gilks	14–17, 15–13, 6–15	(silver) Runner-up
1984	Swedish Open	(England) Dipak Tailor	(Sweden) Thomas Kihlström (Sweden) Maria Bengtsson	6–15, 11–15	(silver) Runner-up
1984	All England Open	(England) Nigel Tier	(England) Martin Dew (England) Gillian Gilks	8–15, 3–15	(silver) Runner-up
1984	Malaysia Open	(England) Nigel Tier	(England) Martin Dew (England) Gillian Gilks	6–15, 5–15	(silver) Runner-up
1984	English Masters	(Scotland) Billy Gilliland	(England) Martin Dew (England) Gillian Gilks	15–18, 7–15	(silver) Runner-up
1984	Scandinavian Cup	(England) Dipak Tailor	(England) Martin Dew (England) Gillian Gilks	14–17, 3–15	(silver) Runner-up
1984	Canada Open	(England) Nigel Tier	(Scotland) Billy Gilliland (England) Karen Chapman	15–3, 15–8	(gold) Winner
1985	Hong Kong Open	(Scotland) Billy Gilliland	(England) Martin Dew (England) Gillian Gilks	10–15, 16–18	(silver) Runner-up
1985	Chinese Taipei Open	(Scotland) Billy Gilliland	(England) Martin Dew (England) Gillian Gilks	8–15, 10–15	(silver) Runner-up
1985	Japan Open	(Scotland) Billy Gilliland	(England) Martin Dew (England) Gillian Gilks	15–10, 18–15	(gold) Winner
1985	German Open	(England) Nigel Tier	(England) Martin Dew (England) Gillian Gilks	15–12, 4–15, 13–15	(silver) Runner-up
1985	Indonesia Open	(England) Nigel Tier	(England) Martin Dew (England) Gillian Gilks	12–15, 0–15	(silver) Runner-up
1985	India Open	(England) Steve Baddeley	(South Korea) Kim Moon-soo (South Korea) Kang Haeng-suk	11–15, 15–9, 15–12	(gold) Winner
1985	English Masters	(Scotland) Billy Gilliland	(Denmark) Steen Fladberg (Denmark) Gitte Paulsen	15–7, 15–5	(gold) Winner
1985	Scandinavian Cup	(England) Nigel Tier	(Sweden) Stefan Karlsson (Sweden) Maria Bengtsson	8–15, 15–5, 15–11	(gold) Winner
1985	Scottish Open	(Scotland) Billy Gilliland	(Netherlands) Rob Ridder (Netherlands) Erica van Dijck	15–12, 10–15, 18–17	(gold) Winner
1986	Japan Open	(England) Nigel Tier	(Scotland) Billy Gilliland (England) Nora Perry	15–17, 9–15	(silver) Runner-up
1986	Dutch Open	(Denmark) Anders Nielsen	(England) Andy Goode (England) Fiona Smith	8–15, 15–10, 5–15	(silver) Runner-up
1986	China Open	(England) Nigel Tier	(South Korea) Park Joo-bong (South Korea) Chung Myung-hee	4–15, 5–15	(silver) Runner-up
1986	Indonesia Open	(England) Steve Baddeley	(Denmark) Steen Fladberg (England) Gillian Clark	5–15, 4–15	(silver) Runner-up
1986	Carlton-Intersport-Cup	(England) Nigel Tier	(England) Martin Dew (England) Gillian Gilks	12–15, 4–15	(silver) Runner-up
1986	English Masters	(Sweden) Jan-Eric Antonsson	(Scotland) Billy Gilliland (England) Nora Perry	15–12, 15–17, 14–17	(silver) Runner-up
1986	World Grand Prix Finals	(England) Nigel Tier	(Sweden) Thomas Kihlström (Sweden) Christine Magnusson	15–8, 18–15	(gold) Winner
1987	Chinese Taipei Open	(Scotland) Billy Gilliland	(Denmark) Steen Fladberg (England) Gillian Clark	7–15, 18–14, 5–15	(silver) Runner-up
1987	Japan Open	(Scotland) Billy Gilliland	(South Korea) Lee Deuk-choon (South Korea) Chung Myung-hee	12–15, 5–15	(silver) Runner-up
1987	Hong Kong Open	(Scotland) Billy Gilliland	(China) Jiang Guoliang (China) Nong Qunhua	18–14, 13–15, 15–7	(gold) Winner
1987	Malaysia Open	(Scotland) Billy Gilliland	(Denmark) Steen Fladberg (England) Gillian Clark	7–15, 6–15	(silver) Runner-up
1987	Indonesia Open	(Denmark) Jan Paulsen	(China) Zhou Jincan (China) Lao Yujing	14–18, 15–9, 15–7	(gold) Winner
1987	Canada Open	(England) Andy Goode	(South Korea) Lee Deuk-choon (South Korea) Chung So-young	3–15, 15–11, 15–5	(gold) Winner
1987	World Grand Prix Finals	(Scotland) Billy Gilliland	(Sweden) Stefan Karlsson (Sweden) Maria Bengtsson	8–15, 15–18	(silver) Runner-up
1988	Chinese Taipei Open	(England) Andy Goode	(Sweden) Jan-Eric Antonsson (Sweden) Maria Bengtsson	15–7, 15–13	(gold) Winner
1988	World Grand Prix Finals	(England) Andy Goode	(China) Wang Pengren (China) Shi Fangjing	6–15, 6–15	(silver) Runner-up
1989	Chinese Taipei Open	(Denmark) Jan Paulsen	(Denmark) Henrik Svarrer (Denmark) Dorte Kjaer	8–15, 6–15	(silver) Runner-up
1989	Poona Open	(Denmark) Jan Paulsen	(Sweden) Jan-Eric Antonsson (Sweden) Maria Bengtsson	18–15, 15–12	(gold) Winner
1989	German Open	(Denmark) Jan Paulsen	(Indonesia) Rudy Gunawan (Indonesia) Rosiana Tendean	18–16, 15–8	(gold) Winner
1989	Scottish Open	(Denmark) Jon Holst-Christensen	(England) Michael Brown (England) Jillian Wallwork	15–6, 15–11	(gold) Winner
1990	Malaysia Open	(Denmark) Jan Paulsen	(South Korea) Park Joo-bong (South Korea) Chung Myung-hee	12–15, 1–15	(silver) Runner-up
1990	Singapore Open	(Denmark) Jan Paulsen	(Sweden) Jan-Eric Antonsson (Sweden) Maria Bengtsson	15–9, 10–15, 7–15	(silver) Runner-up
1990	German Open	(Denmark) Jan Paulsen	(Sweden) Par-Gunnar Jonsson (Sweden) Maria Bengtsson	7–15, 5–15	(silver) Runner-up
1991	Canada Open	(England) Nick Ponting	(Sweden) Par-Gunnar Jonsson (Sweden) Maria Bengtsson	15–10, 15–17, 15–6	(gold) Winner
1991	U.S. Open	(England) Nick Ponting	(South Korea) Lee Sang-bok (South Korea) Shim Eun-jung	14–18, 2–15	(silver) Runner-up
1991	German Open	(Denmark) Jan Paulsen	(Denmark) Thomas Lund (Denmark) Pernille Dupont	12–15, 14–17	(silver) Runner-up
1993	Swedish Open	(Sweden) Peter Axelsson	(Denmark) Thomas Lund (Sweden) Catrine Bengtsson	4–15, 10–15	(silver) Runner-up
1993	Malaysia Open	(Denmark) Michael Søgaard	(Indonesia) Paulus Firman (Indonesia) S. Herawati	18–13, 15–13	(gold) Winner
1993	U.S. Open	(Denmark) Michael Søgaard	(Denmark) Thomas Lund (Sweden) Catrine Bengtsson	7–15, 7–15	(silver) Runner-up
1993	German Open	(Denmark) Michael Søgaard	(Denmark) Thomas Lund (Netherlands) Erica van den Heuvel	4–15, 12–15	(silver) Runner-up
1994	Chinese Taipei Open	(Denmark) Michael Søgaard	(Sweden) Peter Axelsson (Denmark) Marlene Thomsen	18–14, 15–10	(gold) Winner
1994	Japan Open	(Denmark) Michael Søgaard	(Denmark) Jon Holst-Christensen (Sweden) Catrine Bengtsson	7–15, 9–15	(silver) Runner-up
1994	Korea Open	(Denmark) Michael Søgaard	(Sweden) Peter Axelsson (Denmark) Marlene Thomsen	15–12, 15–9	(gold) Winner
1994	Dutch Open	(England) Chris Hunt	(Indonesia) Flandy Limpele (Indonesia) Dede Hasanah	15–5, 15–4	(gold) Winner
1994	China Open	(Denmark) Michael Søgaard	(Denmark) Thomas Lund (Denmark) Marlene Thomsen	3–15, 8–15	(silver) Runner-up
1995	Russian Open	(England) Chris Hunt	(Denmark) Jens Eriksen (Denmark) Marlene Thomsen	3–15, 16–18	(silver) Runner-up

=== IBF International (1 title, 1 runner-up) ===
Women doubles
Year	Tournament	Partner	Opponent	Score	Result
1991	Wimbledon International	(England) Sara Sankey	(England) Julie Bradbury (England) Gillian Clark	15–5, 10–15, 5–15	(silver) Runner-up

Mixed doubles
Year	Tournament	Partner	Opponent	Score	Result
1991	Wimbledon International	(England) Andy Goode	(Soviet Union) Andrey Antropov (Soviet Union) Irina Serova	15–4, 15–0	(gold) Winner
