= Lao Yujing =

Chinese badminton player

Lao Yujing 劳玉晶
Personal information
- Born: 1966 Guangzhou, China
- Died: 28 January 2016 (aged 49–50) Guangzhou, China

Sport
- Country: China
- Sport: Badminton
Medal record
Women's badminton
Representing China
World Championships
Bronze medal – third place	1985 Calgary	Mixed doubles
Uber Cup
Gold medal – first place	1986 Jakarta	Women's Team
Gold medal – first place	1988 Kuala Lumpur	Women's Team

Lao Yujing (Chinese: 劳玉晶, 1966 – 28 January 2016) was a Chinese female badminton player.

== Career ==
She won the bronze medal at the 1985 IBF World Championships in mixed doubles with Zhang Xinguang. At the China Open in 1987, she lost the final of the women's doubles (5-15 and 2–15) with her teammate Wu Jianqiu to Lin Ying and Guan Weizhen. In 1988, her luck turns a bit better since she finally won her first individual Grand Prix with Zheng Yuli after she won the German Open against an English pair of Gillian Clark and Gillian Gowers. Although her individual career is not as glorious as her teammates mostly at that time, Lao was included in two 1986 and 1988 Uber Cup squads that ultimately won the tournament. She played and won all 3 group games in 1986 with Guan Weizhen and 1 game in 1988 with Zheng Yuli and played no further parts in knockout stages of both tournaments.

== Post-retirement and death ==
After the Uber Cup concluded, Lao retires immediately from the squad and became coaches in grassroots level in Guangzhou and actively promoting badminton competitions in her provinces. On 28 January 2016, Lao died in Guangzhou at age 50.

== Achievements ==
=== World Championships ===
Mixed doubles
Year	Venue	Partner	Opponent	Score	Result
1985	Olympic Saddledome; Calgary, Canada	(China) Zhang Xinguang	(Sweden) Stefan Karlsson (Sweden) Maria Bengtsson	15–12, 4–15, 9–15	Bronze

=== IBF World Grand Prix ===
The World Badminton Grand Prix was sanctioned by the International Badminton Federation (IBF) from 1983 to 2006.

Women's doubles
Year	Tournament	Partner	Opponent	Score	Result
1986	Hong Kong Open	(China) Guan Weizhen	(China) Li Lingwei (China) Han Aiping	15–18, 9–15	(silver) Runner-up
1987	China Open	(China) Wu Jianqiu	(China) Guan Weizhen (China) Lin Ying	5–15, 2–15	(silver) Runner-up
1988	German Open	(China) Zheng Yuli	(England) Gillian Clark (England) Gillian Gowers	15–8, 3–15, 15–4	(gold) Winner
1988	Swedish Open	(China) Zheng Yuli	(China) Guan Weizhen (China) Lin Ying	4–15, 8–15	(silver) Runner-up

Mixed doubles
Year	Tournament	Partner	Opponent	Score	Result
1987	Indonesia Open	(China) Zhou Jincan	(Denmark) Jan Paulsen (England) Gillian Gowers	18–14, 9–15, 7–15	(silver) Runner-up
