= Michael Kjeldsen =

Danish badminton player

Personal information
- Born: 13 November 1962 (age 63) Hammel, Region Midtjylland, Denmark

Sport
- Country: Denmark
- Sport: Badminton
- Handedness: Right
- BWF profile
Medal record
Men's badminton
Representing Denmark
World Championships
Bronze medal – third place	1985 Calgary	Men's doubles
Bronze medal – third place	1987 Beijing	Men's doubles
World Cup
Bronze medal – third place	1988 Bangkok	Men's doubles
Sudirman Cup
Bronze medal – third place	1989 Jakarta	Mixed team
European Championships
Gold medal – first place	1988 Kristiansand	Men's doubles
Bronze medal – third place	1986 Uppsala	Men's singles
Bronze medal – third place	1988 Kristiansand	Men's singles
Bronze medal – third place	1986 Uppsala	Men's doubles
European Mixed Team Championships
Gold medal – first place	1986 Uppsala	Mixed team
Gold medal – first place	1988 Kristiansand	Mixed team
European Junior Championships
Gold medal – first place	1981 Edinburgh	Boys' singles
Gold medal – first place	1981 Edinburgh	Boys' doubles
Gold medal – first place	1979 Mülheim an der Ruhr	Mixed team
Gold medal – first place	1981 Edinburgh	Mixed team

Michael Kjeldsen (Danish pronunciation: [ˈmiˌkʰɛˀl ˈkʰelˀsn̩]; born 1962) is a retired male badminton player from Denmark. He is now 1st team coach in The elite club Måløv Badminton Club (MBC). MBC has started their season with two well played matches with Mister Kjeldsen as their coach.

== Career ==
He won the bronze medal at the 1985 IBF World Championships in men's doubles with Mark Christensen. He won men's doubles at the European Badminton Championships in 1988 with Jens Peter Nierhoff.

== Later life ==
Kjeldsen has been head coach of the elite teams in Måløv Badminton Club (MBC) since 2019.

== Achievements ==
=== World Championships ===
Men's doubles
Year	Venue	Partner	Opponent	Score	Result
1985	Olympic Saddledome, Calgary, Canada	(Denmark) Mark Christiansen	(China) Li Yongbo (China) Tian Bingyi	16–18, 18–14, 3–15	Bronze
1987	Capital Indoor Stadium, Beijing, China	(Denmark) Jens Peter Nierhoff	(China) Li Yongbo (China) Tian Bingyi	4–15, 4–15	Bronze

=== World Cup ===
Men's doubles
Year	Venue	Partner	Opponent	Score	Result
1988	National Stadium, Bangkok, Thailand	(Denmark) Jens Peter Nierhoff	(Malaysia) Jalani Sidek (Malaysia) Razif Sidek	6–15, 7–15	Bronze

=== European Championships ===
Men's singles
Year	Venue	Opponent	Score	Result
1986	Fyrishallen, Uppsala, Sweden	(Denmark) Morten Frost	15–7, 4–15, 3–15	Bronze
1988	Badmintonsenteret, Kristiansand, Norway	(England) Darren Hall	6–15, 18–15, 2–15	Bronze

Men's doubles
Year	Venue	Partner	Opponent	Score	Result
1986	Fyrishallen, Uppsala, Sweden	(Denmark) Mark Christiansen	(Sweden) Thomas Kihlstrom (Sweden) Stefan Karlsson	8–15, 6–15	Bronze
1988	Badmintonsenteret, Kristiansand, Norway	(Denmark) Jens Peter Nierhoff	(Denmark) Steen Fladberg (Denmark) Jan Paulsen	15–9, 15–11	Gold

=== European Junior Championships ===
Boys' singles
Year	Venue	Opponent	Score	Result
1981	Meadowbank Sports Centre, Edinburgh, Scotland	(England) Steve Butler	18–13, 15–6	Gold

Boys' doubles
Year	Venue	Partner	Opponent	Score	Result
1981	Meadowbank Sports Centre, Edinburgh, Scotland	(Denmark) Mark Christiansen	(England) Dipak Tailor (England) Andy Wood	15–4, 15–3	Gold

=== IBF World Grand Prix ===
The World Badminton Grand Prix sanctioned by International Badminton Federation (IBF) from 1983 to 2006.

Men's singles
Year	Tournament	Opponent	Score	Result
1984	German Open	(Denmark) Claus Andersen	15–8, 15–8	(gold) Winner
1984	Canadian Open	(Indonesia) Sigit Pamungkas	15–12, 15–11	(gold) Winner
1985	Dutch Open	(Netherlands) Pierre Pelupessy	15–8, 15–12	(gold) Winner
1985	Malaysia Open	(Malaysia) Misbun Sidek	16–18, 6–15	(silver) Runner-up
1986	German Open	(Denmark) Morten Frost	4–15, 3–15	(silver) Runner-up
1986	Denmark Open	(Denmark) Morten Frost	9–15, 10–15	(silver) Runner-up
1987	Scottish Open	(Denmark) Jens Peter Nierhoff	15–11, 9–15, 4–15	(silver) Runner-up
1989	Poona Open	(Denmark) Poul-Erik Høyer Larsen	10–15, 8–15	(silver) Runner-up

Men's doubles
Year	Tournament	Partner	Opponent	Score	Result
1984	Dutch Open	(Denmark) Mark Christiansen	(Scotland) Billy Gilliland (England) Dipak Tailor	15–9, 7–15, 18–17	(gold) Winner
1984	Scandinavian Open	(Denmark) Mark Christiansen	(China) Zhang Qiang (China) Zhou Jincan	15–17, 15–13, 15–18	(silver) Runner-up
1985	Hong Kong Open	(Denmark) Mark Christiansen	(Denmark) Steen Fladberg (Denmark) Jesper Helledie	8–15, 15–7, 12–15	(silver) Runner-up
1985	Chinese Taipei Open	(Denmark) Mark Christiansen	(Indonesia) Rudy Heryanto (Indonesia) Hariamanto Kartono	17–18, 15–8, 17–18	(silver) Runner-up
1985	Dutch Open	(Denmark) Mark Christiansen	(Denmark) Steen Fladberg (Denmark) Jesper Helledie	8–15, 9–15	(silver) Runner-up
1985	All England Open	(Denmark) Mark Christiansen	(South Korea) Kim Moon-soo (South Korea) Park Joo-bong	15–7, 10–15, 9–15	(silver) Runner-up
1985	Thailand Open	(Denmark) Mark Christiansen	(Indonesia) Bobby Ertanto (Indonesia) Rudy Heryanto	9–15, 8–15	(silver) Runner-up
1985	Scottish Open	(Denmark) Mark Christiansen	(Scotland) Billy Gilliland (Scotland) Dan Travers	15–2, 15–4	(gold) Winner
1987	Poona Open	(Denmark) Jens Peter Nierhoff	(Denmark) Peter Buch (Denmark) Nils Skeby	15–3, 17–15	(gold) Winner
1987	Scandinavian Open	(Denmark) Jens Peter Nierhoff	(China) Li Yongbo (China) Tian Bingyi	2–15, 11–15	(silver) Runner-up
1987	Scottish Open	(Denmark) Jens Peter Nierhoff	(Wales) Chris Rees (Wales) Lyndon Williams	15–4, 15–4	(gold) Winner
1988	Poona Open	(Denmark) Jens Peter Nierhoff	(Malaysia) Cheah Soon Kit (Malaysia) Ong Beng Teong	15–10, 10–15, 15–6	(gold) Winner
1988	Dutch Open	(Denmark) Jens Peter Nierhoff	(Indonesia) Rudy Gunawan (Indonesia) Eddy Hartono	15–12, 7–15, 15–4	(gold) Winner
1989	Scottish Open	(Denmark) Mark Christiansen	(Denmark) Max Gandrup (Denmark) Thomas Lund	15–7, 6–15, 10–15	(silver) Runner-up
1990	Chinese Taipei Open	(Denmark) Mark Christiansen	(Denmark) Max Gandrup (Denmark) Thomas Lund	15–9, 16–17, 15–7	(gold) Winner
1990	German Open	(Denmark) Mark Christiansen	(Malaysia) Ong Ewe Chye (Malaysia) Rahman Sidek	14–17, 12–15	(silver) Runner-up
1990	Scottish Open	(Denmark) Mark Christiansen	(Sweden) Jan-Eric Antonsson (Sweden) Pär-Gunnar Jönsson	15–13, 10–15, 11–15	(silver) Runner-up

=== IBF International ===
Men's doubles
Year	Tournament	Partner	Opponent	Score	Result
1985	Malta International	(Denmark) Martin Vissing Sorensen	(Denmark) Martin Skovgaard (Denmark) Henrik Neergaard	11–15, 6–15	(silver) Runner-up
1988	Nordic Championships	(Denmark) Jens Peter Nierhoff	(Sweden) Jan-Eric Antonsson (Sweden) Stellan Österberg	15–0, 15–10	(gold) Winner
1991	Amor Tournament	(Denmark) Claus Thomsen	(Norway) Eric Lia (Norway) Hans Sperre	15–1, 18–16, 12–15	(silver) Runner-up
