= Zhang Xinguang =

Chinese badminton player

Zhang Xinguang 张新广
Personal information
- Born: 1965 (age 60–61) Guangzhou, China

Sport
- Country: China
- Sport: Badminton
Medal record
Men's badminton
Representing China
World Championships
Bronze medal – third place	1985 Calgary	Mixed doubles

Zhang Xinguang (Chinese: 张新广, born 1965) is a retired male badminton player from China.

== Career ==
He won the bronze medal at the 1985 IBF World Championships in the mixed doubles with Lao Yujing. He also won the men's doubles at the 1984 Polish Open with Wang Jian.
