= Atik Jauhari =

Indonesian badminton player (born 1949)

Personal information
- Born: August 14, 1949 Tangerang, Banten (Indonesia)
- Died: November 8, 2026 (Aged 77)

Sport
- Sport: Badminton

Atik Jauhari (born 14 August 1949 in Tangerang in Indonesia) is a badminton coach from Indonesia.

== Biography ==
=== 1974 - 1999 Indonesia National Badminton Association (PBSI) ===
- Senior National Coach. Senior coach for 7-time Thomas Cup Winner Men’s Singles Talent Scout & Coach: Liem Swie King (World Champion, etc.), Icuk Sugiarto (World Champion, etc.), Hastomo Arbi, Eddy Kurniawan, Hermawan Susanto, Ardy Wiranata, Alan Budikusuma, Fung Permadi, etc.
- Men’s Double Coach: Tjun Tjun/Johan Wahjudi (6 times All England Champion, etc.), Bobby Ertanto,/Hadibowo, Imay Hendra/Bagus Setiadi, Eddy Hartono/Gunawan, Ricky Subagja/Rexy Mainaky (World Champion & Olympic Champion, etc.), Antonius/Denny Kantono, Candra Wijaya/Sigit Budiarto (World Champion, etc.), Tony Gunawan/Halim Haryanto (World Champion, etc.), Candra Wijaya/Tony Gunawan (World & Olympic Champion, etc.), etc.

=== 1999 - 2003, Swedish Badminton Federation (SBF) ===
- Senior National Coach. Coached the Swedish Team to reach the final round of Thomas Cup and Uber Cup In Malaysia, 2000.
- Coach for Par Gunnar Jonsson/Peter Axelsson as Runner-Up in European Championship in Scotland .
- Coach for Marina Andrievskaja as Runner-Up in European Championship in Scotland
- Head Coach. 3-time Winner of Swedish National Championship (team match)
- 3-time Runner-up of European Championship (team match)

=== 2006-2008, Thailand badminton Association ===
- National Coach, in result had Boonsak Ponsana as A Winner beating world #1 Lin Dan and runner up Mixed double in Aviva Open Singapore Super Series 2007.

=== 2009-2010 ===
- Head National Coach for the Indian badminton Association (BAI) and has booked the record and brought India as the Finalist in the Commonwealth Games 2010 and Saina Nehwal became Women's #1 rank in the world

=== 2010- present ===
- Owner of the Atik Jauhari Badminton School (Sekolah Badminton Atik Jauhari). focused on talented youth Badminton Athletes and also open classes for professionals and groups.

=== 2010-2012 ===
The Indian National Badminton team Coach, with the result of: 1. Saina Nehwal becoming the first Indian player who won the World Cup 2. Indian becoming the winner of the Commonwealth games

=== 2012- 2013 ===
- Italian Badminton National team coach

== Honors ==
- Indonesian Best Coach, voted by readers of Bola Magazine, Indonesia (year 1994, 1996, 1997)
- Indonesian Best Coach, voted by The Indonesian Journalist Association, Indonesia (year 1994 and 1996)
- Satya Karya Bhakti, honorary medal from the Indonesian Sports Committee (1996)
- Adhi Manggala Krida, honorary medal for Lifetime Achievement from the President of the Republic of Indonesia (1997)
- Satyalancana Kebudayaan, honorary medal for Lifetime Achievement from the President of the Republic of Indonesia (1998)

== Personal life ==
Atik Jauhari is married to Neng Titi and has 4 children (Lanny, Aji, Hanny, Annas) and 3 Grand children named Adrianna, Abigail, Danny, and Dika.

== Achievements ==
=== International Open Tournaments (1 title) ===
Men's doubles

Year	Tournament	Partner	Opponent	Score	Result	Ref
1973	Belgian International	(Indonesia) Budiman	(Indonesia) Setia Hermanto (Indonesia) Lie Wan Chi	15–5, 15–8	(gold) Winner	
