= 1981 European Junior Badminton Championships =

Badminton championships

Tournament details
- Dates: 13–18 April 1981
- Edition: 7th
- Venue: Meadowbank Sports Centre
- Location: Edinburgh, Scotland

The 1981 European Junior Badminton Championships was the seventh edition of the European Junior Badminton Championships. It was held in Edinburgh, Scotland, in the month of April. Denmark won four disciplines, the Boys' singles and doubles, Girls' doubles and mixed team championships, while, English players secured titles in Girls' singles and Mixed doubles.

== Medalists ==
Discipline	Gold	Silver	Bronze
Boys' singles	(Denmark) Michael Kjeldsen	(England) Steve Butler	(England) Dipak Tailor
Boys' singles	(Denmark) Michael Kjeldsen	(England) Steve Butler	(England) Chris Dobson
Girls' singles	(England) Helen Troke	(Denmark) Nettie Nielsen	(England) Mary Leeves
Girls' singles	(England) Helen Troke	(Denmark) Nettie Nielsen	(Denmark) Lotte Hartvich
Boys' doubles	(Denmark) Michael Kjeldsen (Denmark) Mark Christiansen	(England) Dipak Tailor (England) Andy Wood	(England) Chris Dobson (England) Mike Parker
Boys' doubles	(Denmark) Michael Kjeldsen (Denmark) Mark Christiansen	(England) Dipak Tailor (England) Andy Wood	(Denmark) Mogens Nielsen (Denmark) Claus Thomsen
Girls' doubles	(Denmark) Dorte Kjær (Denmark) Nettie Nielsen	(Sweden) Christine Magnusson (Sweden) Maria Bengtsson	(Denmark) Lise Kissmeyer (Denmark) Annette Bernth
Girls' doubles	(Denmark) Dorte Kjær (Denmark) Nettie Nielsen	(Sweden) Christine Magnusson (Sweden) Maria Bengtsson	(England) Mary Leeves (England) Sara Leeves
Mixed doubles	(England) Dipak Tailor (England) Mary Leeves	(Denmark) Mark Christiansen (Denmark) Dorte Kjær	(England) Chris Dobson (England) Gillian Gowers
Mixed doubles	(England) Dipak Tailor (England) Mary Leeves	(Denmark) Mark Christiansen (Denmark) Dorte Kjær	(England) Steve Butler (England) Fiona Elliott
Mixed team	Denmark; Michael Kjeldsen; Mark Christiansen; Kim Brodersen; Claus Thomsen; Mogens Nielsen; Nettie Nielsen; Dorte Kjær; Lise Kissmeyer; Annette Bernth; Lotte Hartvich	England; Steve Butler; Dipak Tailor; Chris Dobson; Andy Wood; Mike Parker; Helen Troke; Mary Leeves; Sara Leeves; Fiona Elliott; Gillian Gowers	Sweden; Ulf Persson; Stellan Österberg; Pär-Gunnar Jönsson; Manfred Mellqvist; Ola Langmarker; Christine Magnusson; Maria Bengtsson

== Results ==
=== Semi-finals ===
Category	Winner	Runner-up	Score
Boys' singles	(Denmark) Michael Kjeldsen	(England) Dipak Tailor	15–7, 15–5
Boys' singles	(England) Steve Butler	(England) Chris Dobson	15–3, 15–9
Girls' singles	(Denmark) Nettie Nielsen	(England) Mary Leeves	11–6, 11–3
Girls' singles	(England) Helen Troke	(Denmark) Lotte Hartvich	9–11, 11–9, 11–3
Boys' doubles	(England) Andy Wood (England) Dipak Tailor	(Denmark) Claus Thomsen (Denmark) Mogens Nielsen	15–5, 15–6
Boys' doubles	(Denmark) Mark Christiansen (Denmark) Michael Kjeldsen	(England) Chris Dobson (England) Mike Parker	15–13, 15–9
Girls' doubles	(Sweden) Christine Magnusson (Sweden) Maria Bengtsson	(England) Annette Bernth (England) Lise Kissmeyer	9–15, 15–7, 15–13
Girls' doubles	(Denmark) Dorte Kjær (Denmark) Nettie Nielsen	(England) Mary Leeves (England) Sara Leeves	15–12, 15–9
Mixed doubles	(Denmark) Mark Christiansen (Denmark) Dorte Kjær	(England) Chris Dobson (England) Gillian Gowers	11–15, 17–15, 15–3
Mixed doubles	(England) Dipak Tailor (England) Mary Leeves	(England) Steve Butler (England) Fiona Elliott	15–2, 15–6

=== Final ===
Category	Winner	Runners-up	Score
Boys' singles	(Denmark) Michael Kjeldsen	(England) Steve Butler	18–13, 15–6
Girls' singles	(England) Helen Troke	(Denmark) Nettie Nielsen	8–11, 12–9, 11–6
Boys' doubles	(Denmark) Mark Christiansen (Denmark) Michael Kjeldsen	(England) Andy Wood (England) Dipak Tailor	15–4, 15–3
Girls' doubles	(Denmark) Dorte Kjær (Denmark) Nettie Nielsen	(Sweden) Christine Magnusson (Sweden) Maria Bengtsson	18–15, 15–10
Mixed doubles	(England) Dipak Tailor (England) Mary Leeves	(Denmark) Mark Christiansen (Denmark) Dorte Kjær	15–7, 15–9

== Medal table ==
Rank	Nation	Gold	Silver	Bronze	Total
1	Denmark (DEN)	4	2	3	9
2	England (ENG)	2	3	7	12
3	Sweden (SWE)	0	1	1	2
Totals (3 entries)		6	6	11	23
