= Dipak Tailor =

English badminton player

Personal information
- Born: 6 June 1964 (age 62)

Sport
- Country: England
- Sport: Badminton
Medal record
Men's badminton
Representing England
Thomas Cup
Bronze medal – third place	1984 Kuala Lumpur	Men's team
Commonwealth Games
Gold medal – first place	1982 Brisbane	Mixed team
European Junior Championships
Gold medal – first place	1981 Edinburgh	Mixed doubles
Silver medal – second place	1981 Edinburgh	Boys' doubles
Silver medal – second place	1981 Edinburgh	Mixed team
Bronze medal – third place	1981 Edinburgh	Boys' singles

Dipak Tailor is a retired male badminton player from England.

== Badminton career ==
Tailor represented England and won a gold medal in the team event, at the 1982 Commonwealth Games in Brisbane, Queensland, Australia. He also competed in the singles, men's doubles and mixed doubles.

== Achievements ==
=== European Junior Championships ===
Boys' singles
Year	Venue	Opponent	Score	Result
1981	Meadowbank Sports Centre; Edinburgh, Scotland	(Denmark) Michael Kjeldsen	7–15, 5–15	Bronze

Boys' doubles
Year	Venue	Partner	Opponent	Score	Result
1981	Meadowbank Sports Centre; Edinburgh, Scotland	(England) Andy Wood	(Denmark) Mark Christiansen (Denmark) Michael Kjeldsen	4–15, 3–15	Silver

Mixed doubles
Year	Venue	Partner	Opponent	Score	Result
1981	Meadowbank Sports Centre; Edinburgh, Scotland	(England) Mary Leeves	(Denmark) Mark Christiansen (Denmark) Dorte Kjær	15–7, 15–9	Gold

=== IBF World Grand Prix ===
The World Badminton Grand Prix sanctioned by International Badminton Federation (IBF) from 1983 to 2006.

Men's doubles
Year	Tournament	Partner	Opponent	Score	Result
1984	Dutch Open	(Scotland) Billy Gilliland	(Denmark) Michael Kjeldsen (Denmark) Mark Christiansen	9–15, 15–7, 17–18	(silver) Runner-up
1985	Malaysia Open	(England) Martin Dew	(Malaysia) Razif Sidek (Malaysia) Jalani Sidek	16–18, 15–12, 3–15	(silver) Runner-up
1985	Scandinavian Cup	(England) Martin Dew	(Denmark) Steen Fladberg (Denmark) Jesper Helledie	12–15, 9–15	(silver) Runner-up
1986	Scandinavian Cup	(England) Martin Dew	(Denmark) Steen Fladberg (Denmark) Jesper Helledie	9–15, 18–15, 7–15	(silver) Runner-up
1986	Carlton-Intersport-Cup	(England) Martin Dew	(Denmark) Steen Fladberg (Denmark) Jesper Helledie	15–9, 18–14	(gold) Winner
1986	Denmark Open	(England) Martin Dew	(China) Li Yongbo (China) Tian Bingyi	9–15, 3–15	(silver) Runner-up
1986	English Masters	(England) Martin Dew	(China) Li Yongbo (China) Tian Bingyi	15–11, 5–15, 11–15	(silver) Runner-up
1987	Poona Open	(England) Martin Dew	(Denmark) Peter Buch (Denmark) Nils Skeby	15–3, 17–15	(gold) Winner
1987	German Open	(England) Martin Dew	(Thailand) Sawei Chanseorasmee (Thailand) Sakrapee Thongsari	12–15, 10–15	(silver) Runner-up

Mixed doubles
Year	Tournament	Partner	Opponent	Score	Result
1983	German Open	(England) Gillian Clark	(Denmark) Steen Fladberg (Denmark) Pia Nielsen	15–11, 12–15, 11–15	(silver) Runner-up
1983	Swedish Open	(England) Barbara Sutton	(Sweden) Thomas Kihlström (England) Nora Perry	7–15, 1–15	(silver) Runner-up
1984	Denmark Open	(England) Nora Perry	(Scotland) Billy Gilliland (Indonesia) Imelda Wiguna	Walkover	(gold) Winner
1984	Swedish Open	(England) Gillian Gowers	(Sweden) Thomas Kihlström (Sweden) Maria Bengtsson	6–15, 11–15	(silver) Runner-up
1984	Scandinavian Cup	(England) Gillian Gowers	(England) Martin Dew (England) Gillian Gilks	14–17, 3–15	(silver) Runner-up
1985	Denmark Open	(England) Nora Perry	(England) Martin Dew (England) Gillian Gilks	8–15, 15–8, 15–10	(gold) Winner
1987	German Open	(England) Gillian Clark	(England) Martin Dew (England) Gillian Gilks	12–15, 7–15	(silver) Runner-up

=== IBF International ===
Men's singles
Year	Tournament	Opponent	Score	Result
1981	Hungarian International	(Czech Republic) Michal Malý	15–13, 4–15, 15–8	(gold) Winner

Men's doubles
Year	Tournament	Partner	Opponent	Score	Result
1980	Hungarian International	(England) Duncan Bridge	(West Germany) Ulrich Rost (West Germany) Bernd Wessels	15–11, 15–11	(gold) Winner
1981	Hungarian International	(England) Chris Dobson	(Czech Republic) Michal Malý (Czech Republic) Karel Lakomý	15–7, 15–5	(gold) Winner
1981	Irish International	(England) Gerry Asquith	(England) Andy Goode (England) Gary Scott	15–9, 10–15, 4–15	(silver) Runner-up
1982	Welsh International	(England) Mike Tredgett	(England) Andy Goode (England) Gary Scott	15–7, 7–15, 15–12	(gold) Winner
1984	Victor Cup	(England) Chris Dobson	(England) Andy Goode (England) Nigel Tier	15–11, 15–12	(gold) Winner
1984	Irish International	(England) Chris Dobson	(England) Kevin Jolly (England) Darren Hall	15–10, 15–12	(gold) Winner
1985	Welsh International	(England) Martin Dew	(England) Mike Tredgett (Scotland) Dan Travers	15–9, 17–14	(gold) Winner

Mixed doubles
Year	Tournament	Partner	Opponent	Score	Result
1981	Hungarian International	(England) Gillian Gowers	(East Germany) Edgar Michalowski (East Germany) Monika Cassens	15–6, 15–13	(gold) Winner
1982	German Open	(England) Gillian Gilks	(Netherlands) Rob Ridder (Netherlands) Marjan Ridder	15–12, 15–7	(gold) Winner
1982	Welsh International	(England) Nora Perry	(England) Mike Tredgett (England) Gillian Clark	18–14, 15–11	(gold) Winner
1982	Swedish Open	(England) Karen Beckman	(England) Duncan Bridge (England) Gillian Clark	9–15, 16–17	(silver) Runner-up
1984	Scottish Open	(England) Karen Beckman	(Scotland) Billy Gilliland (England) Karen Chapman	3–15, 6–15	(silver) Runner-up
1984	Irish International	(England) Barbara Sutton	(Scotland) Billy Gilliland (Scotland) Christine Heatly	9–15, 15–6, 12–15	(silver) Runner-up
