= Maria Bengtsson (badminton) =

Swedish badminton player (born 1964)

Personal information
- Born: 5 March 1964 (age 62) Malmö, Sweden
- Height: 1.63 m (5 ft 4 in)
- Weight: 52 kg (115 lb)

Sport
- Country: Sweden
- Sport: Badminton
- Handedness: Right
- BWF profile
Medal record
Women's badminton
Representing Sweden
World Championships
| Silver medal – second place | 1985 Calgary | Mixed doubles |
| Silver medal – second place | 1991 Copenhagen | Women's doubles |
| Bronze medal – third place | 1989 Jakarta | Women's doubles |
World Cup
| Bronze medal – third place | 1988 Bangkok | Mixed doubles |
| Bronze medal – third place | 1989 Guangzhou | Mixed doubles |
| Bronze medal – third place | 1991 Macau | Mixed doubles |
| Bronze medal – third place | 1992 Guangzhou | Mixed doubles |
| Bronze medal – third place | 1993 New Delhi | Mixed doubles |
Uber Cup
| Bronze medal – third place | 1992 Kuala Lumpur | Women's team |
| Bronze medal – third place | 1994 Jakarta | Women's team |
European Championships
| Silver medal – second place | 1984 Preston | Mixed doubles |
| Silver medal – second place | 1990 Moscow | Mixed doubles |
| Bronze medal – third place | 1984 Preston | Women's doubles |
| Bronze medal – third place | 1986 Uppsala | Women's doubles |
| Bronze medal – third place | 1986 Uppsala | Mixed doubles |
| Bronze medal – third place | 1988 Kristiansand | Women's doubles |
| Bronze medal – third place | 1988 Kristiansand | Mixed doubles |
| Bronze medal – third place | 1990 Moscow | Women's doubles |
| Bronze medal – third place | 1992 Glasgow | Women's doubles |
| Bronze medal – third place | 1992 Glasgow | Mixed doubles |
| Bronze medal – third place | 1994 Den Bosch | Women's doubles |
| Bronze medal – third place | 1994 Den Bosch | Mixed doubles |
European Mixed Team Championships
| Gold medal – first place | 1992 Glasgow | Mixed team |
| Gold medal – first place | 1994 Den Bosch | Mixed team |
| Silver medal – second place | 1982 Böblingen | Mixed team |
| Silver medal – second place | 1988 Kristiansand | Mixed team |
| Silver medal – second place | 1990 Moscow | Mixed team |
| Bronze medal – third place | 1984 Preston | Mixed team |
| Bronze medal – third place | 1986 Uppsala | Mixed team |
European Junior Championships
| Silver medal – second place | 1981 Edinburgh | Girls' doubles |
| Bronze medal – third place | 1979 Mülheim | Girls' doubles |
| Bronze medal – third place | 1981 Edinburgh | Mixed team |

Maria Bengtsson (born 5 March 1964) is a badminton player from Sweden who played in three editions of Olympic games in 1988, 1992 and 1996.

== Career ==
She won two silver medals at the World Badminton Championships, one in 1985 in mixed doubles with Stefan Karlsson and another in 1991 in women's doubles with Christine Magnusson. She won a bronze medal at the 1989 IBF World Championships in women's doubles, also with Magnusson.

Bengtsson competed in badminton at the 1992 Summer Olympics in women's singles and women's doubles with Catrine Bengtsson, and they lost in the quarterfinals to Guan Weizhen and Nong Qunhua, of China, 15–4, 15–9.

== Personal life ==
Her daughter Johanna Magnusson is also a badminton player.

== Achievements ==
=== World Championships ===
Women's doubles
| Year | Venue | Partner | Opponent | Score | Result |
|---|---|---|---|---|---|
| 1989 | Istora Senayan; Jakarta, Indonesia | (Sweden) Christine Magnusson | (China) Guan Weizhen (China) Lin Ying | 2–15, 3–15 | Bronze |
| 1991 | Brøndby Arena; Copenhagen, Denmark | (Sweden) Christine Magnusson | (China) Guan Weizhen (China) Nong Qunhua | 7–15, 4–15 | Silver |

Mixed doubles
| Year | Venue | Partner | Opponent | Score | Result |
|---|---|---|---|---|---|
| 1985 | Olympic Saddledome; Calgary, Canada | (Sweden) Stefan Karlsson | (South Korea) Park Joo-bong (South Korea) Yoo Sang-hee | 10–15, 15–12, 12–15 | Silver |

=== World Cup ===
Mixed doubles
| Year | Venue | Partner | Opponent | Score | Result |
|---|---|---|---|---|---|
| 1988 | National Stadium; Bangkok, Thailand | (Sweden) Jan-Eric Antonsson | (South Korea) Park Joo-bong (South Korea) Chung Myung-hee | 6–15, 12–15 | Bronze |
| 1989 | Guangzhou Gymnasium; Guangzhou, China | (Sweden) Jan-Eric Antonsson | (South Korea) Park Joo-bong (South Korea) Chung Myung-hee | 2–15, 8–15 | Bronze |
| 1991 | Macau Forum; Macau | (Sweden) Pär-Gunnar Jönsson | (Denmark) Thomas Lund (Denmark) Pernille Dupont | 4–15, 2–15 | Bronze |
| 1992 | Guangdong Gymnasium; Guangzhou, China | (Sweden) Pär-Gunnar Jonsson | (Denmark) Jan Paulsen (England) Gillian Gowers | 15–12, 14–18, 14–17 | Bronze |
| 1993 | Indira Gandhi Indoor Stadium; New Delhi, India | (Sweden) Pär-Gunnar Jonsson | (Indonesia) Aryono Miranat (Indonesia) Eliza Nathanael | 14–17, 15–7, 9–15 | Bronze |

=== European Championships ===
Women's doubles
| Year | Venue | Partner | Opponent | Score | Result |
|---|---|---|---|---|---|
| 1984 | Guild Hall; Preston, England | (Sweden) Christine Magnusson | (England) Karen Chapman (England) Gillian Clark | Walkover | Bronze |
| 1986 | Fyrishallen; Uppsala, Sweden | (Sweden) Christine Magnusson | (England) Gillian Clark (England) Gillian Gowers | 10–15, 15–8, 11–15 | Bronze |
| 1988 | Badmintonsenteret; Kristiansand, Norway | (Sweden) Christine Magnusson | (Denmark) Dorte Kjær (Denmark) Nettie Nielsen | 8–15, 9–15 | Bronze |
| 1990 | Luzhniki; Moscow, Soviet Union | (Sweden) Christine Magnusson | (Denmark) Dorte Kjær (Denmark) Nettie Nielsen | 15–13, 5–15, 3–15 | Bronze |
| 1992 | Kelvin Hall International Sports Arena; Glasgow, Scotland | (Sweden) Catrine Bengtsson | (Denmark) Lisbet Stuer-Lauridsen (Denmark) Marlene Thomsen | 15–9, 16–18, 3–15 | Bronze |
| 1994 | Maaspoort; Den Bosch, Netherlands | (Netherlands) Erica van den Heuvel | (Denmark) Lisbet Stuer-Lauridsen (Denmark) Lotte Olsen | 2–15, 8–15 | Bronze |

Mixed doubles
| Year | Venue | Partner | Opponent | Score | Result |
|---|---|---|---|---|---|
| 1984 | Guild Hall; Preston, England | (Sweden) Thomas Kihlström | (England) Martin Dew (England) Gillian Gilks | 5–15, 15–17 | Silver |
| 1986 | Fyrishallen; Uppsala, Sweden | (Sweden) Thomas Kihlström | (England) Nigel Tier (England) Gillian Gowers | 11–15, 12–15 | Bronze |
| 1988 | Badmintonsenteret; Kristiansand, Norway | (Sweden) Jan-Eric Antonsson | (Netherlands) Alex Meijer (Netherlands) Erica van Dijck | 15–10, 11–15, 10–15 | Bronze |
| 1990 | Luzhniki; Moscow, Soviet Union | (Sweden) Jan-Eric Antonsson | (Denmark) Jon-Holst Christensen (Denmark) Grete Mogensen | 7–15, 8–15 | Silver |
| 1992 | Kelvin Hall International Sports Arena; Glasgow, Scotland | (Sweden) Pär-Gunnar Jönsson | (Denmark) Jon-Holst Christensen (Denmark) Grete Mogensen | 6–15, 11–15 | Bronze |
| 1994 | Maaspoort; Den Bosch, Netherlands | (Sweden) Pär-Gunnar Jönsson | (Denmark) Michael Søgaard (Sweden) Catrine Bengtsson | 6–15, 6–15 | Bronze |

=== European Junior Championships ===
Girls' doubles
| Year | Venue | Partner | Opponent | Score | Result |
|---|---|---|---|---|---|
| 1981 | Meadowbank Sports Centre; Edinburgh, Scotland | (Sweden) Christine Magnusson | (Denmark) Dorte Kjær (Denmark) Nettie Nielsen | 15–18, 10–15 | Silver |

=== IBF World Grand Prix ===
The World Badminton Grand Prix was sanctioned by the International Badminton Federation from 1983 to 2006.

Women's doubles
| Year | Tournament | Partner | Opponent | Score | Result |
|---|---|---|---|---|---|
| 1985 | Scandinavian Open | (Sweden) Christine Magnusson | (South Korea) Kim Yun-ja (South Korea) Yoo Sang-hee | 15–8, 5–15, 1–15 | (silver) Runner-up |
| 1985 | Scottish Open | (Sweden) Christine Magnusson | (Denmark) Dorte Kjær (Denmark) Nettie Nielsen | 13–15, 8–15 | (silver) Runner-up |
| 1986 | Scottish Open | (Sweden) Christine Magnusson | (Denmark) Dorte Kjær (Denmark) Nettie Nielsen | 8–15, 11–15 | (silver) Runner-up |
| 1986 | English Masters | (Sweden) Christine Magnusson | (England) Gillian Clark (England) Gillian Gowers | 15–5, 15–11 | (gold) Winner |
| 1987 | Chinese Taipei Open | (Sweden) Christine Magnusson | (South Korea) Chung Myung-hee (South Korea) Hwang Hye-young | 17–14, 9–15, 4–15 | (silver) Runner-up |
| 1987 | Dutch Open | (Sweden) Christine Magnusson | (England) Gillian Clark (England) Sara Halsall | 15–10, 15–4 | (gold) Winner |
| 1988 | Chinese Taipei Open | (Sweden) Christine Magnusson | (England) Gillian Clark (England) Gillian Gowers | 6–15, 15–6, 15–6 | (gold) Winner |
| 1989 | Chinese Taipei Open | (Sweden) Christine Magnusson | (Denmark) Dorte Kjær (Denmark) Lotte Olsen | 15–13, 9–15, 15–6 | (gold) Winner |
| 1989 | Poona Open | (Sweden) Christine Magnusson | (England) Gillian Clark (England) Sara Sankey | 15–4, 13–15, 15–4 | (gold) Winner |
| 1990 | Finnish Open | (Sweden) Christine Magnusson | (England) Gillian Clark (England) Gillian Gowers | 15–12, 15–12 | (gold) Winner |
| 1990 | Singapore Open | (Sweden) Christine Magnusson | (England) Gillian Clark (England) Gillian Gowers | 12–15, 13–15 | (silver) Runner-up |
| 1990 | Dutch Open | (Sweden) Christine Magnusson | (Denmark) Nettie Nielsen (Denmark) Lisbet Stuer-Lauridsen | 9–15, 11–15 | (silver) Runner-up |
| 1990 | Scottish Open | (Sweden) Catrine Bengtsson | (England) Gillian Clark (England) Gillian Gowers | 18–16, 15–11 | (gold) Winner |
| 1991 | Swedish Open | (Sweden) Catrine Bengtsson | (England) Gillian Clark (Denmark) Nettie Nielsen | 15–13, 9–15, 10–15 | (silver) Runner-up |
| 1991 | Dutch Open | (Sweden) Catrine Bengtsson | (England) Gillian Gowers (England) Sara Sankey | 9–15, 16–18 | (silver) Runner-up |
| 1992 | Swiss Open | (Sweden) Catrine Bengtsson | (Germany) Katrin Schmidt (Germany) Kerstin Ubben | 15–10, 15–10 | (gold) Winner |
| 1992 | Swedish Open | (Sweden) Catrine Bengtsson | (China) Lin Yanfen (China) Yao Fen | 6–15, 16–17 | (silver) Runner-up |
| 1992 | German Open | (Sweden) Catrine Bengtsson | (Sweden) Lim Xiaoqing (Sweden) Christine Magnusson | 9–15, 0–15 | (silver) Runner-up |
| 1992 | Denmark Open | (Sweden) Catrine Bengtsson | (Sweden) Lim Xiaoqing (Sweden) Christine Magnusson | 7–15, 3–15 | (silver) Runner-up |
| 1992 | Scottish Open | (Sweden) Catrine Bengtsson | (Sweden) Lim Xiaoqing (Sweden) Christine Magnusson | 6–15, 6–15 | (silver) Runner-up |
| 1995 | French Open | (Sweden) Margit Borg | (Russia) Elena Rybkina (Russia) Marina Yakusheva | 15–10, 15–6 | (gold) Winner |
| 1995 | Scottish Open | (Sweden) Catrine Bengtsson | (England) Emma Constable (England) Sarah Hardaker | 15–7, 15–5 | (gold) Winner |

Mixed doubles
| Year | Tournament | Partner | Opponent | Score | Result |
|---|---|---|---|---|---|
| 1984 | Japan Open | (Sweden) Thomas Kihlström | (England) Martin Dew (England) Gillian Gilks | 15–5, 3–15, 16–18 | (silver) Runner-up |
| 1984 | Swedish Open | (Sweden) Thomas Kihlström | (England) Dipak Tailor (England) Gillian Gowers | 15–6, 15–11 | (gold) Winner |
| 1985 | Swedish Open | (Sweden) Stefan Karlsson | (South Korea) Lee Deuk-choon (South Korea) Chung Myung-hee | 15–5, 11–15, 15–7 | (gold) Winner |
| 1985 | Scandinavian Open | (Sweden) Stefan Karlsson | (England) Nigel Tier (England) Gillian Gowers | 15–8, 5–15, 11–15 | (silver) Runner-up |
| 1987 | Dutch Open | (Sweden) Stefan Karlsson | (Denmark) Mark Christiansen (Netherlands) Erica van Dijck | 10–15, 15–2, 15–9 | (gold) Winner |
| 1987 | Scandinavian Open | (Sweden) Stefan Karlsson | (China) Li Ang (China) Pan Zhenli | 15–12, 7–15, 15–3 | (gold) Winner |
| 1987 | Denmark Open | (Denmark) Mark Christiansen | (Denmark) Thomas Lund (Denmark) Pernille Dupont | 15–12, 15–5 | (gold) Winner |
| 1987 | World Grand Prix Finals | (Sweden) Stefan Karlsson | (Scotland) Billy Gilliland (England) Gillian Gowers | 15–8, 18–15 | (gold) Winner |
| 1988 | Chinese Taipei Open | (Sweden) Jan-Eric Antonsson | (England) Andy Goode (England) Gillian Gowers | 7–15, 13–15 | (silver) Runner-up |
| 1988 | Scottish Open | (Sweden) Pär-Gunnar Jönsson | (Denmark) Nils Skeby (Denmark) Gitte Paulsen | Walkover | (gold) Winner |
| 1989 | Poona Open | (Sweden) Jan-Eric Antonsson | (Denmark) Jan Paulsen (England) Gillian Gowers | 15–18, 12–15 | (silver) Runner-up |
| 1989 | All England Open | (Sweden) Jan-Eric Antonsson | (South Korea) Park Joo-bong (South Korea) Chung Myung-hee | 1–15, 9–15 | (silver) Runner-up |
| 1989 | Denmark Open | (Sweden) Pär-Gunnar Jönsson | (Denmark) Jesper Knudsen (Denmark) Nettie Nielsen | 6–15, 6–15 | (silver) Runner-up |
| 1990 | Chinese Taipei Open | (Sweden) Jan-Eric Antonsson | (Denmark) Thomas Lund (Denmark) Pernille Dupont | 4–15, 15–4, 10–15 | (silver) Runner-up |
| 1990 | Swedish Open | (Sweden) Jan-Eric Antonsson | (Denmark) Jon Holst-Christensen (Denmark) Grete Mogensen | 15–12, 8–15, 15–9 | (gold) Winner |
| 1990 | Singapore Open | (Sweden) Jan-Eric Antonsson | (Denmark) Jan Paulsen (England) Gillian Gowers | 9–15, 15–10, 15–7 | (gold) Winner |
| 1990 | Dutch Open | (Sweden) Pär-Gunnar Jönsson | (Denmark) Jon Holst-Christensen (Denmark) Grete Mogensen | 15–11, 15–8 | (gold) Winner |
| 1990 | German Open | (Sweden) Pär-Gunnar Jönsson | (Denmark) Jan Paulsen (England) Gillian Gowers | 15–7, 15–5 | (gold) Winner |
| 1991 | Chinese Taipei Open | (Sweden) Pär-Gunnar Jönsson | (Denmark) Thomas Lund (Denmark) Pernille Dupont | 9–15, 15–10, 16–18 | (silver) Runner-up |
| 1991 | Swedish Open | (Sweden) Pär-Gunnar Jönsson | (Denmark) Thomas Lund (Denmark) Pernille Dupont | 7–15, 8–15 | (silver) Runner-up |
| 1991 | Finnish Open | (Denmark) Henrik Svarrer | (Denmark) Max Gandrup (England) Gillian Clark | 15–12, 15–9 | (gold) Winner |
| 1991 | Singapore Open | (Sweden) Pär-Gunnar Jönsson | (Denmark) Thomas Lund (Denmark) Pernille Dupont | 8–15, 12–15 | (silver) Runner-up |
| 1991 | Canadian Open | (Sweden) Pär-Gunnar Jönsson | (England) Nick Ponting (England) Gillian Gowers | 10–15, 17–15, 6–15 | (silver) Runner-up |
| 1991 | Dutch Open | (Sweden) Pär-Gunnar Jönsson | (Denmark) Henrik Svarrer (Denmark) Marlene Thomsen | 13–15, 11–15 | (silver) Runner-up |
| 1992 | Chinese Taipei Masters | (Sweden) Pär-Gunnar Jönsson | (Denmark) Henrik Svarrer (Denmark) Marlene Thomsen | 15–6, 17–15 | (gold) Winner |
| 1992 | Swiss Open | (Sweden) Mikael Rosén | (Sweden) Jan-Eric Antonsson (Sweden) Astrid Crabo | 15–18, 15–12, 15–5 | (gold) Winner |
| 1992 | Swedish Open | (Sweden) Pär-Gunnar Jönsson | (Denmark) Max Gandrup (Sweden) Catrine Bengtsson | 15–8, 15–12 | (gold) Winner |
| 1992 | Indonesia Open | (Sweden) Pär-Gunnar Jönsson | (Indonesia) Aryono Miranat (Indonesia) Eliza Nathanael | 12–15, 15–11, 15–12 | (gold) Winner |
| 1992 | Singapore Open | (Sweden) Pär-Gunnar Jönsson | (South Korea) Lee Sang-bok (South Korea) Gil Young-ah | 15–3, 15–10 | (gold) Winner |
| 1992 | German Open | (Sweden) Pär-Gunnar Jönsson | (Denmark) Thomas Lund (Denmark) Pernille Dupont | 9–15, 12–15 | (silver) Runner-up |
| 1993 | Swiss Open | (Sweden) Pär-Gunnar Jönsson | (Sweden) Jan-Eric Antonsson (Sweden) Astrid Crabo | 11–15, 17–14, 15–7 | (gold) Winner |
| 1993 | Dutch Open | (Sweden) Pär-Gunnar Jönsson | (Sweden) Jan-Eric Antonsson (Sweden) Astrid Crabo | 13–18, 15–9, 9–15 | (silver) Runner-up |

=== IBF International ===
Women's doubles
| Year | Tournament | Partner | Opponent | Score | Result |
|---|---|---|---|---|---|
| 1981 | USSR International | (Sweden) Christine Magnusson | (Sweden) Alla Prodan (Sweden) Irina Melnikova | 15–10, 15–6 | (gold) Winner |
| 1982 | Nordic Championships | (Sweden) Christine Magnusson | (Denmark) Dorte Kjær (Denmark) Nettie Nielsen | 5–15, 9–15 | (silver) Runner-up |
| 1983 | Northumberland Championships | (Sweden) Christine Magnusson | (Denmark) Dorte Kjær (Denmark) Nettie Nielsen | 12–15, 10–15 | (silver) Runner-up |
| 1983 | Nordic Championships | (Sweden) Christine Magnusson | (Sweden) Carina Andersson (Sweden) Lilian Johansson | 15–3, 18–13 | (gold) Winner |
| 1984 | Nordic Championships | (Sweden) Christine Magnusson | (Denmark) Dorte Kjær (Denmark) Kirsten Larsen | 7–15, 17–14, 10–15 | (silver) Runner-up |
| 1985 | Nordic Championships | (Sweden) Christine Magnusson | (Denmark) Dorte Kjær (Denmark) Nettie Nielsen | 4–15, 18–16, 13–15 | (silver) Runner-up |
| 1986 | Nordic Championships | (Sweden) Christine Magnusson | (Denmark) Dorte Kjær (Denmark) Nettie Nielsen | 8–15, 11–15 | (silver) Runner-up |
| 1987 | Nordic Championships | (Sweden) Christine Magnusson | (Denmark) Dorte Kjær (Denmark) Nettie Nielsen | 15–11, 4–15, 4–15 | (silver) Runner-up |
| 1988 | Nordic Championships | (Sweden) Catrine Bengtsson | (Denmark) Dorte Kjær (Denmark) Nettie Nielsen | 18–14, 4–15, 8–15 | (silver) Runner-up |
| 1990 | Stockholm International | (Sweden) Margit Borg | (Sweden) Emma Edbom (Sweden) Ulrika Gideonsson | 15–6, 15–5 | (gold) Winner |
| 1994 | Norwegian International | (Sweden) Margit Borg | (Sweden) Karolina Ericsson (Sweden) Ulrika Persson | 15–0, 15–3 | (gold) Winner |
| 1994 | Irish International | (Sweden) Margit Borg | (Denmark) Helene Kirkegaard (Denmark) Rikke Olsen | 11–15, 12–15 | (silver) Runner-up |
| 1995 | La Chaux-de-Fonds International | (Sweden) Margit Borg | (Germany) Heidi Dössing (Germany) Karen Stechmann | 8–15, 15–12, 15–2 | (gold) Winner |
| 1995 | Malmö International | (Sweden) Margit Borg | (Denmark) Michelle Rasmussen (Denmark) Mette Sørensen | 15–9, 15–8 | (gold) Winner |
| 1996 | Strasbourg International | (Sweden) Margit Borg | | | (gold) Winner |
| 1996 | Malmö International | (Sweden) Margit Borg | (Denmark) Pernille Harder (Denmark) Ann-Lou Jørgensen | 15–4, 15–7 | (gold) Winner |

Mixed doubles
| Year | Tournament | Partner | Opponent | Score | Result |
|---|---|---|---|---|---|
| 1982 | Nordic Championships | (Sweden) Thomas Kihlström | (Denmark) Steen Skovgaard (Denmark) Hanne Adsbøl | 6–15, 10–15 | (silver) Runner-up |
| 1983 | Nordic Championships | (Sweden) Thomas Kihlström | (Denmark) Steen Fladberg (Denmark) Grete Mogensen | 15–2, 9–15, 15–5 | (gold) Winner |
| 1985 | Nordic Championships | (Sweden) Stefan Karlsson | (Sweden) Thomas Kihlström (Sweden) Christine Magnusson | 15–9, 15–7 | (gold) Winner |
| 1986 | Nordic Championships | (Sweden) Jan-Eric Antonsson | (Denmark) Steen Fladberg (Denmark) Gitte Paulsen | 17–16, 15–3 | (gold) Winner |
| 1988 | Nordic Championships | (Sweden) Jan-Eric Antonsson | (Denmark) Jesper Knudsen (Denmark) Nettie Nielsen | 11–15, 17–16, 10–15 | (silver) Runner-up |
| 1992 | Nordic Championships | (Sweden) Pär-Gunnar Jönsson | (Sweden) Jan-Eric Antonsson (Sweden) Astrid Crabo | 15–6, 12–15, 15–10 | (gold) Winner |
| 1993 | Uppsala International | (Sweden) Mikael Rosén | (Sweden) Jan-Eric Antonsson (Sweden) Astrid Crabo | 6–15, 7–15 | (silver) Runner-up |
| 1994 | Norwegian International | (Sweden) Robert Larsson | | 15–6, 15–2 | (gold) Winner |
| 1995 | Malmö International | (Denmark) Jesper Larsen | (Denmark) Thomas Stavngaard (Denmark) Ann Jørgensen | 9–15, 14–17 | (silver) Runner-up |
| 1996 | Malmö International | (Sweden) Robert Larsson | (Denmark) Jesper Larsen (Denmark) Majken Vange | 15–5, 15–11 | (gold) Winner |
