= Mark Christiansen =

Danish badminton player

Personal information
- Born: 21 October 1963 (age 63) Aalborg, North Jutland Region, Denmark

Sport
- Country: Denmark
- Sport: Badminton
- Handedness: Right
- BWF profile
Medal record
Men's badminton
Representing Denmark
World Championships
| Bronze medal – third place | 1985 Calgary | Men's doubles |
Sudirman Cup
| Bronze medal – third place | 1989 Jakarta | Mixed team |
European Championships
| Bronze medal – third place | 1986 Uppsala | Men's Doubles |
European Mixed Team Championships
| Gold medal – first place | 1986 Uppsala | Mixed team |
European Junior Championships
| Gold medal – first place | 1981 Edinburgh | Boys' doubles |
| Gold medal – first place | 1979 Mülheim an der Ruhr | Mixed team |
| Gold medal – first place | 1981 Edinburgh | Mixed team |
| Silver medal – second place | 1981 Edinburgh | Mixed doubles |

Mark Christiansen (born 21 October 1963) is a retired male badminton player from Denmark. He won the bronze medal at the 1985 IBF World Championships in men's doubles with Michael Kjeldsen.

== Achievements ==
=== World Championships ===
Men's doubles
| Year | Venue | Partner | Opponent | Score | Result |
|---|---|---|---|---|---|
| 1985 | Olympic Saddledome, Calgary, Canada | (Denmark) Michael Kjeldsen | (China) Li Yongbo (China) Tian Bingyi | 16–18, 18–14, 3–15 | Bronze |

=== European Championships ===
Men's doubles
| Year | Venue | Partner | Opponent | Score | Result |
|---|---|---|---|---|---|
| 1986 | Fyrishallen, Uppsala, Sweden | (Denmark) Michael Kjeldsen | (Sweden) Thomas Kihlstrom (Sweden) Stefan Karlsson | 8–15, 6–15 | Bronze |

=== European Junior Championships ===
Boys' doubles
| Year | Venue | Partner | Opponent | Score | Result |
|---|---|---|---|---|---|
| 1981 | Meadowbank Sports Centre, Edinburgh, Scotland | (Denmark) Michael Kjeldsen | (England) Dipak Tailor (England) Andy Wood | 15–4, 15–3 | Gold |

Mixed doubles
| Year | Venue | Partner | Opponent | Score | Result |
|---|---|---|---|---|---|
| 1981 | Meadowbank Sports Centre, Edinburgh, Scotland | (Denmark) Dorte Kjaer | (England) Dipak Tailor (England) Mary Leeves | 7–15, 9–15 | Silver |

=== IBF World Grand Prix ===
The World Badminton Grand Prix sanctioned by International Badminton Federation (IBF) from 1983 to 2006.

Men's doubles
| Year | Tournament | Partner | Opponent | Score | Result |
|---|---|---|---|---|---|
| 1984 | Dutch Open | (Denmark) Michael Kjeldsen | (Scotland) Billy Gilliland (England) Dipak Tailor | 15–9, 7–15, 18–17 | (gold) Winner |
| 1984 | Scandinavian Open | (Denmark) Michael Kjeldsen | (China) Zhang Qiang (China) Zhou Jincan | 15–17, 15–13, 15–18 | (silver) Runner-up |
| 1985 | Hong Kong Open | (Denmark) Michael Kjeldsen | (Denmark) Steen Fladberg (Denmark) Jesper Helledie | 8–15, 15–7, 12–15 | (silver) Runner-up |
| 1985 | Chinese Taipei Open | (Denmark) Michael Kjeldsen | (Indonesia) Rudy Heryanto (Indonesia) Hariamanto Kartono | 17–18, 15–8, 17–18 | (silver) Runner-up |
| 1985 | Dutch Open | (Denmark) Michael Kjeldsen | (Denmark) Steen Fladberg (Denmark) Jesper Helledie | 8–15, 9–15 | (silver) Runner-up |
| 1985 | All England Open | (Denmark) Michael Kjeldsen | (South Korea) Kim Moon-soo (South Korea) Park Joo-bong | 15–7, 10–15, 9–15 | (silver) Runner-up |
| 1985 | Thailand Open | (Denmark) Michael Kjeldsen | (Indonesia) Rudy Heryanto (Indonesia) Bobby Ertanto | 9–15, 8–15 | (silver) Runner-up |
| 1985 | Scottish Open | (Denmark) Michael Kjeldsen | (Scotland) Billy Gilliland (Scotland) Dan Travers | 15–2, 15–4 | (gold) Winner |
| 1987 | Chinese Taipei Open | (Sweden) Stefan Karlsson | (Indonesia) Eddy Hartono (Indonesia) Liem Swie King | 4–15, 5–15 | (silver) Runner-up |
| 1987 | Dutch Open | (Sweden) Stefan Karlsson | (Indonesia) Rudy Gunawan (Indonesia) Bambang Subagio | 15–8, 15–2 | (gold) Winner |
| 1987 | Carlton-Intersport Cup | (Sweden) Stefan Karlsson | (Denmark) Jesper Knudsen (Denmark) Henrik Svarrer | 15–6, 15–10 | (gold) Winner |
| 1989 | Scottish Open | (Denmark) Michael Kjeldsen | (Denmark) Max Gandrup (Denmark) Thomas Lund | 15–7, 6–15, 10–15 | (silver) Runner-up |
| 1990 | Chinese Taipei Open | (Denmark) Michael Kjeldsen | (Denmark) Max Gandrup (Denmark) Thomas Lund | 15–9, 16–17, 15–7 | (gold) Winner |
| 1990 | German Open | (Denmark) Michael Kjeldsen | (Malaysia) Rahman Sidek (Malaysia) Ong Ewe Chye | 14–17, 12–15 | (silver) Runner-up |
| 1990 | Scottish Open | (Denmark) Michael Kjeldsen | (Sweden) Jan-Eric Antonsson (Sweden) Pär-Gunnar Jönsson | 15–13, 10–15, 11–15 | (silver) Runner-up |

Mixed doubles
| Year | Tournament | Partner | Opponent | Score | Result |
|---|---|---|---|---|---|
| 1987 | Dutch Open | (Netherlands) Erica Van Den Heuvel | (Sweden) Stefan Karlsson (Sweden) Maria Bengtsson | 15–10, 2–15, 9–15 | (silver) Runner-up |
| 1987 | French Open | (Netherlands) Erica Van Den Heuvel | (South Korea) Park Joo-bong (South Korea) Kim Yun-ja | 10–15, 7–15 | (silver) Runner-up |
| 1987 | Denmark Open | (Sweden) Maria Bengtsson | (Denmark) Thomas Lund (Denmark) Pernille Dupont | 15–12, 15–5 | (gold) Winner |
