= Gillian Clark (badminton) =

British badminton player (born 1961)

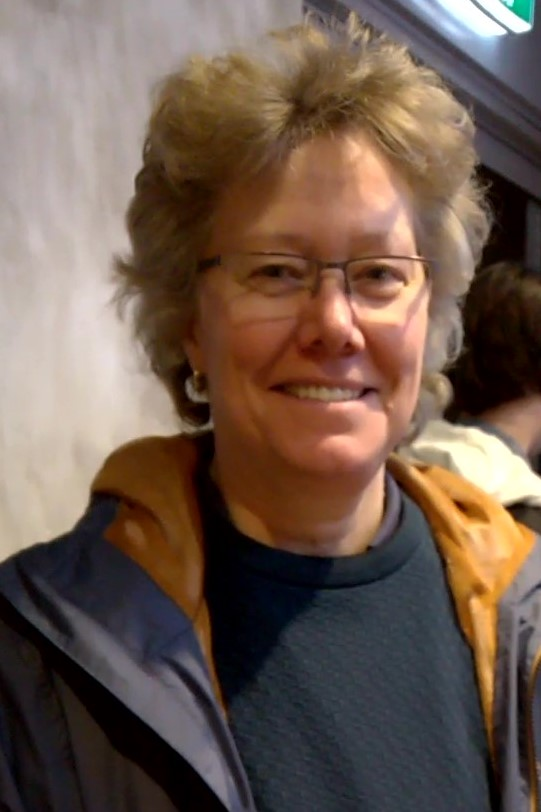
- Clark in 2017

Personal information
- Born: Gillian Margaret Clark; 2 September 1961 (age 65) Baghdad, Iraqi Republic
- Height: 1.73 m (5 ft 8 in)

Sport
- Country: England
- Sport: Badminton
- Handedness: Right
- Event: Women's & Mixed doubles

Women's & Mixed doubles
- BWF profile
Medal record
Women's badminton
Representing England
World Championships
Bronze medal – third place	1983 Copenhagen	Women's doubles
Bronze medal – third place	1993 Birmingham	Mixed doubles
World Cup
Silver medal – second place	1986 Jakarta	Mixed doubles
Silver medal – second place	1987 Kuala Lumpur	Mixed doubles
Bronze medal – third place	1983 Kuala Lumpur	Women's doubles
Bronze medal – third place	1984 Jakarta	Women's doubles
Bronze medal – third place	1991 Macau	Women's doubles
Bronze medal – third place	1992 Guangzhou	Women's doubles
Bronze medal – third place	1990 Jakarta	Mixed doubles
Bronze medal – third place	1993 New Delhi	Mixed doubles
Uber Cup
Silver medal – second place	1984 Kuala Lumpur	Women's team
Commonwealth Games
Gold medal – first place	1982 Brisbane	Mixed team
Gold medal – first place	1986 Edinburgh	Women's doubles
Gold medal – first place	1986 Edinburgh	Mixed team
Gold medal – first place	1990 Auckland	Mixed team
Gold medal – first place	1994 Victoria	Mixed doubles
Gold medal – first place	1994 Victoria	Mixed team
Silver medal – second place	1982 Brisbane	Women's doubles
Silver medal – second place	1990 Auckland	Women's doubles
Silver medal – second place	1994 Victoria	Women's doubles
Bronze medal – third place	1982 Brisbane	Women's singles
Bronze medal – third place	1986 Edinburgh	Women's singles
Bronze medal – third place	1990 Auckland	Mixed doubles
European Championships
Gold medal – first place	1982 Böblingen	Women's doubles
Gold medal – first place	1984 Preston	Women's doubles
Gold medal – first place	1986 Uppsala	Women's doubles
Gold medal – first place	1988 Kristiansand	Mixed doubles
Silver medal – second place	1988 Kristiansand	Women's doubles
Bronze medal – third place	1984 Preston	Mixed doubles
Bronze medal – third place	1990 Moscow	Women's doubles
Bronze medal – third place	1994 Den Bosch	Women's doubles
European Mixed Team Championships
Gold medal – first place	1982 Böblingen	Mixed team
Gold medal – first place	1984 Preston	Mixed team
Silver medal – second place	1986 Uppsala	Mixed team
Bronze medal – third place	1988 Kristiansand	Mixed team
Bronze medal – third place	1990 Moscow	Mixed team
Bronze medal – third place	1992 Glasgow	Mixed team
Bronze medal – third place	1994 Den Bosch	Mixed team
European Junior Championships
Gold medal – first place	1977 Ta' Qali	Mixed team
Gold medal – first place	1979 Mülheim	Girls' doubles
Silver medal – second place	1979 Mülheim	Mixed team

Gillian Margaret Clark MBE (born 2 September 1961) is an English badminton commentator and former badminton player who specialized in doubles.

== Career ==
Clark was awarded Distinguished Service Award by the International Badminton Federation in 1995.

=== World Championships ===
Clark won two bronze medals at the World Championships a decade apart; for women's doubles in 1983, and for mixed doubles in 1993.

=== Olympic Games ===
Clark competed in badminton at the 1992 Summer Olympics in women's doubles with Julie Bradbury. In the first round they defeated Erma Sulistianingsih and Rosiana Tendean of Indonesia and in the second round Katrin Schmidt and Kerstin Ubben of Germany. In the quarterfinals they were beaten by the eventual gold medalists, Hwang Hye-young and Chung So-young of Korea, 5–15, 5–15.

=== All England Championship ===
She reached the finals of the prestigious All England Open Championships; in the 1985 mixed doubles with Thomas Kihlström, the 1990 doubles with Gillian Gowers and 1994 the mixed with Chris Hunt.

=== Commonwealth Games ===
Clark has won twelve Commonwealth Games medals spanning four Games from 1982 until 1994. The medal breakdown was six gold medals (one with Gillian Gowers in the doubles, one with Chris Hunt in the mixed doubles and four in the team event), three silver medals all in the doubles and three bronze medals in the singles and mixed doubles.

=== European Championships ===
She won four gold medals at the biennial European Championships; three consecutively (1982, 1984, and 1986) in women's doubles and one in mixed doubles (1988).

== Personal life ==
Clark has been the lead commentator for the Badminton World Federation (BWF) for the past 25 years. After her competitive career in badminton, Clark transitioned to broadcasting. She is known for her catchphrase, "I don't believe it," and is frequently called "Oma Gill" by many fans.

Clark was harassed by a stalker for more than 10 years since 2001. The perpetrator was diagnosed with persistent delusional personality disorder and jailed for 2 years.

== Achievements ==
=== World Championships ===
Women's doubles
Year	Venue	Partner	Opponent	Score	Result
1983	Brøndbyhallen, Copenhagen, Denmark	(England) Gillian Gilks	(China) Lin Ying (China) Wu Dixi	3–15, 17–18	Bronze

Mixed doubles
Year	Venue	Partner	Opponent	Score	Result
1993	National Indoor Arena, Birmingham, England	(England) Nick Ponting	(Denmark) Thomas Lund (Sweden) Catrine Bengtsson	8–15, 15–18	Bronze

=== World Cup ===
Women's doubles
Year	Venue	Partner	Opponent	Score	Result
1983	Stadium Negara, Kuala Lumpur, Malaysia	(England) Gillian Gilks	(China) Wu Jianqiu (China) Xu Rong	5–15, 3–15	Bronze
1984	Istora Senayan, Jakarta, Indonesia	(England) Nora Perry	(China) Wu Jianqiu (China) Xu Rong	15–12, 9–15, 10–15	Bronze
1991	Macau Forum, Macau	(Denmark) Nettie Nielsen	(South Korea) Hwang Hye-young (South Korea) Chung So-young	5–15, 16–18	Bronze
1992	Guangdong Gymnasium, Guangzhou, China	(Sweden) Christine Magnusson	(China) Lin Yanfen (China) Yao Fen		Bronze

Mixed doubles
Year	Venue	Partner	Opponent	Score	Result
1986	Istora Senayan, Jakarta, Indonesia	(Denmark) Steen Fladberg	(Indonesia) Eddy Hartono (Indonesia) Verawaty Fadjrin	8–15, 15–17	Silver
1987	Stadium Negara, Kuala Lumpur, Malaysia	(Denmark) Steen Fladberg	(China) Wang Pengren (China) Shi Fangjing	11–15, 15–1, 4–15	Silver
1990	Istora Senayan, Jakarta, Indonesia	(Denmark) Henrik Svarrer	(Indonesia) Rudy Gunawan (Indonesia) Rosiana Tendean	11–15, 9–15	Bronze
1993	Indira Gandhi Arena, New Delhi, India	(England) Nick Ponting	(Sweden) Peter Axelsson (England) Gillian Gowers	12–15, 11–15	Bronze

=== Commonwealth Games ===
Women's singles
Year	Venue	Opponent	Score	Result
1982	Chandler Sports Hall, Brisbane, Australia	(England) Karen Beckman	Walkover	Bronze
1986	Meadowbank Sports Centre, Edinburgh, Scotland	(Canada) Denyse Julien	11–3, 11–3	Bronze

Women's doubles
Year	Venue	Partner	Opponent	Score	Result
1982	Chandler Sports Hall, Brisbane, Australia	(England) Karen Beckman	(Canada) Claire Backhouse-Sharpe (Canada) Johanne Falardeau	15–13, 16–18, 4–15	Silver
1986	Meadowbank Sports Centre; Edinburgh, Scotland	(England) Gillian Gowers	(Canada) Denyse Julien (Canada) Johanne Falardeau	15–6, 15–7	Gold
1990	Auckland Badminton Hall; Auckland, New Zealand	(England) Gillian Gowers	(England) Fiona Smith (England) Sara Sankey	14–18, 15–2, 9–15	Silver
1994	McKinnon Gym, Victoria, Canada	(England) Julie Bradbury	(England) Joanne Muggeridge (England) Joanne Wright	9–15, 11–15	Silver

Mixed doubles
Year	Venue	Partner	Opponent	Score	Result
1990	Auckland Badminton Hall; Auckland, New Zealand	(England) Andy Goode	(England) Steve Baddeley (England) Gillian Gowers	Walkover	Bronze
1994	McKinnon Gym, Victoria, Canada	(England) Chris Hunt	(England) Simon Archer (England) Julie Bradbury	15–11, 15–4	Gold

=== European Championships ===
Women's doubles
Year	Venue	Partner	Opponent	Score	Result
1982	Sporthalle, Böblingen, West Germany	(England) Gillian Gilks	(England) Nora Perry (England) Jane Webster	15–3, 15–11	Gold
1984	Guild Hall, Preston, England	(England) Karen Chapman	(England) Karen Beckman (England) Gillian Gilks	15–17, 15–12, 15–2	Gold
1986	Fyrishallen, Uppsala, Sweden	(England) Gillian Gowers	(Denmark) Dorte Kjær (Denmark) Nettie Nielsen	15–11, 15–12	Gold
1988	Badmintonsenteret, Kristiansand, Norway	(England) Julie Munday	(Denmark) Dorte Kjær (Denmark) Nettie Nielsen	7–15, 4–15	Silver
1990	Luzhniki, Moscow, Soviet Union	(England) Gillian Gowers	(Netherlands) Eline Coene (Netherlands) Erica van Dijck	10–15, 15–11, 15–17	Bronze
1994	Maaspoort Sports and Events, Den Bosch, Netherlands	(England) Julie Bradbury	(Sweden) Lim Xiaoqing (Sweden) Christine Magnusson	11–15, 15–12, 14–16	Bronze

Mixed doubles
Year	Venue	Partner	Opponent	Score	Result
1984	Guild Hall, Preston, England	(England) Nigel Tier	(England) Martin Dew (England) Gillian Gilks	11–15, 8–15	Bronze
1988	Badmintonsenteret, Kristiansand, Norway	(Denmark) Steen Fladberg	(Netherlands) Alex Meijer (Netherlands) Erica van Dijck	17–16, 4–15, 15–10	Gold

=== European Junior Championships ===
Girls' doubles
Year	Venue	Partner	Opponent	Score	Result
1979	Carl Diem Halle; Mülheim an der Ruhr, West Germany	(England) Sally Leadbeater	(Denmark) Charlotte Pilgaard (Denmark) Bettina Kristensen	15–12, 15–9	Gold

=== IBF World Grand Prix (26 titles, 25 runners-up) ===
The World Badminton Grand Prix sanctioned by International Badminton Federation (IBF) since 1983.

Women's doubles
Year	Tournament	Partner	Opponent	Score	Result
1983	Japan Open	(England) Gillian Gilks	(England) Nora Perry (England) Jane Webster	15–6, 15–8	(gold) Winner
1983	Dutch Open	(England) Gillian Gilks	(England) Sally Podger (England) Karen Chapman	15–8, 17–16	(gold) Winner
1984	German Open	(England) Karen Chapman	(England) Karen Beckman (England) Gillian Gilks	14–17, 14–18	(silver) Runner-up
1984	Malaysia Open	(Sweden) Christine Magnusson	(China) Wu Jianqiu (China) Guan Weizhen	10–15, 13–15	(silver) Runner-up
1985	Chinese Taipei Open	(England) Nora Perry	(England) Karen Beckman (England) Gillian Gilks	10–15, 17–14, 15–0	(gold) Winner
1985	Dutch Open	(England) Gillian Gowers	(Netherlands) Eline Coene (Netherlands) Erica van Dijck	15–4, 15–2	(gold) Winner
1985	Malaysia Open	(England) Gillian Gowers	(Indonesia) Verawaty Fadjrin (Indonesia) Dwi Elmyati	15–10, 15–11	(gold) Winner
1985	India Open	(England) Gillian Gowers	(South Korea) Hwang Sun-ae (South Korea) Kang Haeng-suk	7–15, 12–15	(silver) Runner-up
1985	English Masters	(England) Gillian Gowers	(England) Karen Beckman (England) Sara Sankey	11–15, 5–15	(silver) Runner-up
1986	Carlton-Intersport-Cup	(England) Gillian Gowers	(Denmark) Dorte Kjær (Denmark) Nettie Nielsen	15–9, 15–11	(gold) Winner
1986	Denmark Open	(England) Gillian Gowers	(China) Zheng Yuli (China) Gu Jiaming	9–15, 18–15, 17–16	(gold) Winner
1986	English Masters	(England) Gillian Gowers	(Sweden) Maria Bengtsson (Sweden) Christine Magnusson	5–15, 11–15	(silver) Runner-up
1987	Poona Open	(England) Gillian Gowers	(Indonesia) Sarwendah Kusumawardhani (Indonesia) Erma Sulistianingsih	15–3, 15–5	(gold) Winner
1987	German Open	(England) Gillian Gowers	(China) Lin Ying (China) Guan Weizhen	6–15, 10–15	(silver) Runner-up
1987	English Masters	(England) Gillian Gowers	(Denmark) Dorte Kjær (Denmark) Nettie Nielsen	8–15, 12–15	(silver) Runner-up
1987	Denmark Open	(England) Gillian Gowers	(Japan) Atsuko Tokuda (Japan) Yoshiko Yonekura	7–15, 10–15	(silver) Runner-up
1988	Japan Open	(England) Gillian Gowers	(South Korea) Chung Myung-hee (South Korea) Chung So-young	2–15, 15–7, 6–15	(silver) Runner-up
1988	German Open	(England) Gillian Gowers	(China) Lao Yujing (China) Zheng Yuli	8–15, 15–3, 4–15	(silver) Runner-up
1988	Dutch Open	(England) Sara Sankey	(Denmark) Dorte Kjær (Denmark) Nettie Nielsen	9–15, 15–9, 15–6	(gold) Winner
1988	English Masters	(England) Sara Sankey	(China) Lin Ying (China) Guan Weizhen	6–15, 8–15	(silver) Runner-up
1988	Scottish Open	(England) Sara Sankey	(Denmark) Dorte Kjær (Denmark) Gitte Paulsen	Walkover	(gold) Winner
1989	Japan Open	(England) Julie Munday	(South Korea) Chung Myung-hee (South Korea) Chung So-young	15–4, 10–15, 15–3	(gold) Winner
1989	Poona Open	(England) Sara Sankey	(Sweden) Maria Bengtsson (Sweden) Christine Magnusson	4–15, 15–13, 4–15	(silver) Runner-up
1989	German Open	(England) Gillian Gowers	(Indonesia) Erma Sulistianingsih (Indonesia) Rosiana Tendean	15–10, 2–15, 9–15	(silver) Runner-up
1989	Dutch Open	(England) Gillian Gowers	(Denmark) Pernille Dupont (Denmark) Grete Mogensen	11–15, 9–15	(silver) Runner-up
1989	Scottish Open	(England) Gillian Gowers	(England) Karen Chapman (England) Sara Sankey	15–10, 15–6	(gold) Winner
1990	Chinese Taipei Open	(England) Gillian Gowers	(South Korea) Chun Sung-suk (South Korea) Shim Eun-jung	15–3, 15–6	(gold) Winner
1990	Finnish Open	(England) Gillian Gowers	(Sweden) Maria Bengtsson (Sweden) Christine Magnusson	12–15, 12–15	(silver) Runner-up
1990	All England Open	(England) Gillian Gowers	(South Korea) Chung Myung-hee (South Korea) Hwang Hye-young	15–6, 4–15, 4–15	(silver) Runner-up
1990	Singapore Open	(England) Gillian Gowers	(Sweden) Maria Bengtsson (Sweden) Christine Magnusson	15–12, 15–13	(gold) Winner
1990	Scottish Open	(England) Gillian Gowers	(Sweden) Catrine Bengtsson (Sweden) Maria Bengtsson	16–18, 11–15	(silver) Runner-up
1991	Japan Open	(England) Gillian Gowers	(China) Guan Weizhen (China) Nong Qunhua	6–15, 18–15, 15–9	(gold) Winner
1991	Finnish Open	(Denmark) Nettie Nielsen	(China) Pan Li (China) Wu Yuhong	15–9, 14–17, 15–11	(gold) Winner
1991	Malaysia Open	(Denmark) Nettie Nielsen	(South Korea) Hwang Hye-young (South Korea) Chung So-young	10–15, 11–15	(silver) Runner-up
1991	Swedish Open	(Denmark) Nettie Nielsen	(Sweden) Catrine Bengtsson (Sweden) Maria Bengtsson	13–15, 15–9, 15–10	(gold) Winner
1992	Indonesia Open	(England) Gillian Gowers	(Indonesia) Erma Sulistianingsih (Indonesia) Rosiana Tendean	12–15, 9–15	(silver) Runner-up
1992	Singapore Open	(England) Gillian Gowers	(China) Chen Ying (China) Sheng Wenqing	16–18, 15–4, 15–8	(gold) Winner
1992	World Grand Prix Finals	(England) Gillian Gowers	(China) Lin Yanfen (China) Yao Fen	7–15, 16–17	(silver) Runner-up
1993	Swiss Open	(England) Joanne Wright	(Russia) Marina Andrievskaya (Russia) Marina Yakusheva	15–8, 15–7	(gold) Winner

Mixed doubles
Year	Tournament	Partner	Opponent	Score	Result
1984	Malaysia Open	(England) Martin Dew	(England) Nigel Tier (England) Gillian Gowers	15–6, 15–5	(gold) Winner
1985	All England Open	(Sweden) Thomas Kihlström	(Scotland) Billy Gilliland (England) Nora Perry	10–15, 12–15	(silver) Runner-up
1986	Indonesia Open	(Denmark) Steen Fladberg	(England) Steve Baddeley (England) Gillian Gowers	15–4, 15–5	(gold) Winner
1987	Chinese Taipei Open	(Denmark) Steen Fladberg	(Scotland) Billy Gilliland (England) Gillian Gowers	15–7, 14–18, 15–5	(gold) Winner
1987	Malaysia Open	(Denmark) Steen Fladberg	(Scotland) Billy Gilliland (England) Gillian Gowers	15–7, 15–6	(gold) Winner
1988	Poona Open	(Denmark) Steen Fladberg	(Denmark) Nils Skeby (Denmark) Dorte Kjær	15–8, 15–6	(gold) Winner
1988	German Open	(Denmark) Steen Fladberg	(England) Martin Dew (England) Gillian Gilks	9–15, 18–14, 15–4	(gold) Winner
1988	Thailand Open	(Denmark) Steen Fladberg	(China) Wang Pengren (China) Shi Fangjing	17–14, 4–15, 15–9	(gold) Winner
1991	Finnish Open	(Denmark) Max Gandrup	(Denmark) Henrik Svarrer (Sweden) Maria Bengtsson	12–15, 9–15	(silver) Runner-up
1993	Chinese Taipei Open	(England) Nick Ponting	(Indonesia) Denny Kantono (Indonesia) Zelin Resiana	Walkover	(silver) Runner-up
1993	World Grand Prix Finals	(England) Nick Ponting	(Denmark) Thomas Lund (Sweden) Catrine Bengtsson	9–15, 7–15	(silver) Runner-up
1994	All England Open	(England) Chris Hunt	(England) Nick Ponting (England) Joanne Wright	10–15, 11–15	(silver) Runner-up

=== IBF International ===
Women's singles
Year	Tournament	Opponent	Score	Result
1981	French Open	(Soviet Union) Svetlana Belyasova	12–10, 6–11, 7–11	(silver) Runner-up
1983	Silver Bowl International	(England) Gillian Gowers	6–11, 4–11	(silver) Runner-up
1983	Auckland International	(England) Gillian Gowers		(gold) Winner

Women's doubles
Year	Tournament	Partner	Opponent	Score	Result
1979	Czechoslovakian International	(England) Sally Leadbeater	(Denmark) Charlotte Pilgaard (Denmark) Kirsten Larsen	15–9, 15–5	(gold) Winner
1980	Czechoslovakian International	(England) Kathleen Redhead	(Denmark) Dorte Kjær (Denmark) Pia Nielsen	15–5, 15–5	(gold) Winner
1982	Scottish Open	(England) Gillian Gilks	(England) Helen Troke (England) Barbara Sutton	15–3, 15–8	(gold) Winner
1982	India Open	(England) Gillian Gilks	(England) Karen Chapman (England) Jane Webster	15–1, 15–8	(gold) Winner
1982	Indonesia Open	(England) Gillian Gilks	(Japan) Atsuko Tokuda (Japan) Yoshiko Yonekura	17–14, 14–17, 15–12	(gold) Winner
1982	Canadian Open	(England) Gillian Gilks	(Canada) Claire Backhouse (Canada) Johanne Falardeau	17–14, 15–6	(gold) Winner
1983	Silver Bowl International	(England) Gillian Gowers	(Australia) Julie McDonald (Australia) Audrey Swaby	11–15, 10–15	(silver) Runner-up
1983	Auckland International	(England) Gillian Gowers	(Australia) Julie McDonald (Australia) Audrey Swaby		(gold) Winner
1983	English Masters	(England) Gillian Gilks	(China) Chen Ruizhen (China) Zheng Jian	12–7 retired	(silver) Runner-up
1984	Silver Bowl International	(Australia) Maxine Evans	(Canada) Claire Backhouse-Sharpe (Canada) Linda Cloutier	15–9, 17–15	(gold) Winner
1984	Auckland International	(Australia) Maxine Evans	(Canada) Claire Backhouse-Sharpe (Canada) Linda Cloutier	15–9, 11–15, 2–15	(silver) Runner-up
1984	English Masters	(England) Nora Perry	(China) Lin Ying (China) Wu Dixi	5–15, 1–15	(silver) Runner-up
1984	Dutch Masters	(England) Nora Perry	(China) Lin Ying (China) Wu Dixi	4–15, 9–15	(silver) Runner-up
1991	Wimbledon International	(England) Julie Bradbury	(England) Gillian Gowers (England) Sara Sankey	5–15, 15–10, 15–5	(gold) Winner
1991	Spanish International	(England) Julie Bradbury	(Republic of Ireland) Ciara Doheny (Germany) Katrin Schmidt	12–15, 15–12, 15–7	(gold) Winner

Mixed doubles
Year	Tournament	Partner	Opponent	Score	Result
1979	Czechoslovakian International	(England) Andy Goode	(Denmark) Kenneth Larsen (Denmark) Charlotte Pilgaard	9–15, 6–15	(silver) Runner-up
1982	Welsh Open	(England) Mike Tredgett	(England) Dipak Tailor (England) Nora Perry	14–18, 11–15	(silver) Runner-up
1991	Spanish International	(England) Andy Goode	(Spain) David Serrano (Spain) Eshter Sanz	15–7, 15–3	(gold) Winner
