= Belgian International =

Badminton tournament in Belgium

The Belgian International is an international badminton open tournament, held since 1958 but in irregular periods.

Since 2005, Yonex has become title sponsor of the event, which also become an International Challenge tournament within the Badminton Europe tournament circuit.

== Previous winners ==
Year	Men's singles	Women's singles	Men's doubles	Women's doubles	Mixed doubles
1959	(Denmark) Knud Aage Nielsen	(Denmark) Tonny Holst-Christensen	(England) Hugh Findlay (England) Ronald Lockwood	(England) Heather Ward (England) Barbara Carpenter	(England) Hugh T. Findlay (England) Heather Ward
1960– 1961	No competition				
1962	(Malaysia) Oon Chong Teik	(England) Ursula Smith	(Malaysia) Oon Chong Teik (Denmark) Ole Mertz	(Denmark) Karin Jørgensen (Denmark) Ulla Rasmussen	(Denmark) Finn Kobberø (Denmark) Ulla Rasmussen
1963– 1968	No competition				
1969	(Singapore) Lee Kin Tat	(Netherlands) Tonny Pannemans	(Singapore) Lee Kin Tat (Mexico) Roy Díaz González	(Belgium) June Jacques (Belgium) Gerda Cairns	(Netherlands) Leo Kountul (Netherlands) Tony Pannemans
1970	(Sweden) Kurt Johnsson	(Denmark) Imre Nielsen	(England) David Horton (England) Elliot Stuart	(England) Margaret Boxall (England) Susan Whetnall	(England) Paul Whetnall (England) Margaret Boxall
1971	(Malaysia) Punch Gunalan	(Netherlands) Joke van Beusekom	(Malaysia) Punch Gunalan (Malaysia) Ng Boon Bee	(Netherlands) Joke van Beusekom (Netherlands) Felice do Nooyer	(Malaysia) Ng Boon Bee (Malaysia) Sylvia Ng
1972	(Malaysia) Tan Aik Huang	(Netherlands) Tonny Pannemans	(Malaysia) Punch Gunalan (Malaysia) Ng Boon Bee	(Netherlands) Tony Pannemans (West Germany) Lore Hawig	(Netherlands) Clemens Wortel (Netherlands) Tony Pannemans
1973	(Indonesia) Atik Jauhari	(Netherlands) Joke van Beusekom	(Indonesia) Atik Jauhari (Indonesia) Budinan	(South Africa) Barbara Lord (South Africa) Dorte Tyghe	(South Africa) Kenneth Parsons (South Africa) Dorte Tyghe
1974	No competition				
1975	(South Africa) William Kerr	(Czechoslovakia) Alena Poboráková	(South Africa) William Kerr (South Africa) Kenneth Parsons	(Czechoslovakia) Alena Poboráková (Czechoslovakia) Taťána Pravdová	(South Africa) Kenneth Parsons (South Africa) Alan Parsons
1976	(Netherlands) Rob Ridder	(South Africa) Gussie Botes	(South Africa) John Abrahams (South Africa) Gordon McMillan	(Netherlands) Marjan Luesken (South Africa) Gaylene Thatcher	(South Africa) Alan Phillips (South Africa) Marianne van der Walt
1977	(West Germany) Karl-Heinz Zwiebler	(Netherlands) Hanke de Kort	(England) Ray Sharp (England) Ray Rolfe	(Netherlands) Hanke de Kort (Netherlands) Marja Ravelli	(Netherlands) Clemens Wortel (Netherlands) Hanke de Kort
1978– 1979	No competition				
1980	(West Germany) Ulrich Rost	(Netherlands) Marjan Ridder	(Netherlands) Rob Ridder (Netherlands) Piet Ridder	(Netherlands) Hanke de Kort (Netherlands) Marjan Ridder	(Netherlands) Rob Ridder (Netherlands) Marjan Ridder
1981	(Wales) Barry Burns	(Netherlands) Carol Liem	(Netherlands) Ivan Kristanto (Netherlands) Frank van Dongen	(Netherlands) Paula Kloet (Netherlands) Grace Kakiay	(Netherlands) Bas von Barnau-Sijthoff (Netherlands) Jeanette van Driel
1982– 1984	No competition				
1985	(Austria) Tariq Farooq	(England) Sally Podger	(West Germany) Michael Fischedick (West Germany) Mathias Klein	(England) Sally Podger (Sweden) Lena Staxler	(Netherlands) Dennis Tjin Asjoe (Netherlands) Jeanette van Driel
1986– 2000	No competition				
2001	(France) Nabil Lasmari	(Indonesia) Hanny Setiani	(Belgium) Wouter Claes (Belgium) Frédéric Mawet	(England) Harriet Johnson (Denmark) Karina Sørensen	(Belgium) Wouter Claes (Denmark) Karina Sørensen
2002– 2004	No competition				
2005	(Denmark) Anders Boesen	(Germany) Xu Huaiwen	(Germany) Ingo Kindervater (Germany) Kristof Hopp	(Germany) Juliane Schenk (Germany) Nicole Grether	(Germany) Kristof Hopp (Germany) Birgit Overzier
2006	(Denmark) Kasper Ødum	(Germany) Petra Overzier	(Sweden) Imanuel Hirschfeldt (Indonesia) Imam Sodikin	(Russia) Marina Yakusheva (Russia) Elena Shimko	(Russia) Vitalij Durkin (Russia) Valeria Sorokina
2007	(Germany) Marc Zwiebler	(Ukraine) Larissa Griga	(Germany) Kristof Hopp (Germany) Ingo Kindervater	(England) Natalie Munt (England) Joanne Nicholas	(England) Chris Langridge (England) Joanne Nicholas
2008	(Japan) Kenichi Tago	(Germany) Juliane Schenk	(Scotland) Andrew Bowman (Wales) Martyn Lewis	(Russia) Valeria Sorokina (Russia) Nina Vislova	(Russia) Vitalij Durkin (Russia) Nina Vislova
2009	(Germany) Marc Zwiebler	(Netherlands) Yao Jie	(Netherlands) Ruud Bosch (Netherlands) Koen Ridder	(Japan) Misaki Matsutomo (Japan) Ayaka Takahashi	(England) Heather Olver (England) Marcus Ellis
2010	(Germany) Marc Zwiebler	(Germany) Juliane Schenk	(Germany) Ingo Kindervater (Germany) Johannes Schöttler	(Germany) Sandra Marinello (Germany) Birgit Overzier	(Germany) Michael Fuchs (Germany) Birgit Overzier
2011	(France) Brice Leverdez	(Germany) Olga Konon	(Poland) Adam Cwalina (Poland) Michał Łogosz	(Singapore) Shinta Mulia Sari (Singapore) Yao Lei	(Singapore) Chayut Triyachart (Singapore) Yao Lei
2012	(Indonesia) Andre Kurniawan Tedjono	(France) Sashina Vignes Waran	(Poland) Adam Cwalina (Netherlands) Koen Ridder	(Netherlands) Selena Piek (Netherlands) Iris Tabeling	(England) Marcus Ellis (England) Gabrielle White
2013	(Indonesia) Andre Kurniawan Tedjono	(Indonesia) Febby Angguni	(Denmark) Kim Astrup (Denmark) Anders Skaarup Rasmussen	(Scotland) Imogen Bankier (Bulgaria) Petya Nedelcheva	(Denmark) Anders Skaarup Rasmussen (Denmark) Lena Grebak
2014	(Denmark) Hans-Kristian Vittinghus	(Canada) Michelle Li	(Denmark) Mathias Christiansen (Denmark) David Daugaard	(Netherlands) Eefje Muskens (Netherlands) Selena Piek	(Netherlands) Jacco Arends (Netherlands) Selena Piek
2015	(Denmark) Anders Antonsen	(Malaysia) Goh Jin Wei	(India) Manu Attri (India) B. Sumeeth Reddy	(Denmark) Maiken Fruergaard (Denmark) Sara Thygesen	(Poland) Robert Mateusiak (Poland) Nadieżda Zięba
2016	(France) Lucas Corvée	(Malaysia) Soniia Cheah	(Chinese Taipei) Lu Ching-yao (Chinese Taipei) Yang Po-han	(England) Chloe Birch (England) Lauren Smith	(France) Ronan Labar (France) Audrey Fontaine
2017	(Japan) Kento Momota	(Spain) Beatriz Corrales	(Denmark) Frederik Colberg (Denmark) Rasmus Fladberg	(Netherlands) Selena Piek (Netherlands) Cheryl Seinen	(Netherlands) Jacco Arends (Netherlands) Selena Piek
2018	(England) Toby Penty	(Chinese Taipei) Lin Ying-chun	(Netherlands) Jacco Arends (Netherlands) Ruben Jille	(France) Delphine Delrue (France) Léa Palermo	(Netherlands) Jacco Arends (Netherlands) Selena Piek
2019	(India) Lakshya Sen	(Denmark) Line Christophersen	(England) Ben Lane (England) Sean Vendy	(Bulgaria) Gabriela Stoeva (Bulgaria) Stefani Stoeva	(England) Ben Lane (England) Jessica Pugh
2020	Cancelled (Note: This tournament, originally to be played from 9 to 12 September, was later cancelled due to the COVID-19 pandemic in Belgium.)				
2021	(Malaysia) Ng Tze Yong	(Japan) Riko Gunji	(Indonesia) Pramudya Kusumawardana (Indonesia) Yeremia Rambitan	(Japan) Rin Iwanaga (Japan) Kie Nakanishi	(Japan) Hiroki Midorikawa (Japan) Natsu Saito
2022	(Chinese Taipei) Lin Chun-yi	(Vietnam) Nguyễn Thùy Linh	(Chinese Taipei) Chang Ko-chi (Chinese Taipei) Po Li-wei	(Japan) Rui Hirokami (Japan) Yuna Kato	(Japan) Hiroki Midorikawa (Japan) Natsu Saito
2023	(France) Lucas Claerbout	(Turkey) Neslihan Arın	(Denmark) Andreas Søndergaard (Denmark) Jesper Toft	(Japan) Maiko Kawazoe (Japan) Haruna Konishi	(England) Marcus Ellis (England) Lauren Smith
2024	(Belgium) Julien Carraggi	(India) Anmol Kharb	(Netherlands) Ties van der Lecq (Netherlands) Brian Wassink	(Scotland) Julie MacPherson (Scotland) Ciara Torrance	(Denmark) Rasmus Espersen (Denmark) Amalie Cecilie Kudsk
2025	(Japan) Minoru Koga	(Bulgaria) Kaloyana Nalbantova	(Denmark) Kristoffer Kolding (Denmark) Calvin Lundsgaard	(Bulgaria) Gabriela Stoeva (Bulgaria) Stefani Stoeva	(Denmark) Rasmus Espersen (Denmark) Amalie Cecilie Kudsk
2026	(Denmark) Karan Rajan	(Scotland) Kirsty Gilmour	(Scotland) Christopher Grimley (Scotland) Matthew Grimley	(Denmark) Amalie Cecilie Kudsk (Denmark) Simona Pilgaard	(Denmark) Jeppe Søby (Denmark) Sofie Røjkjær

== Poona Open ==
Year	Men's singles	Women's singles	Men's doubles	Women's doubles	Mixed doubles
1980	(Belgium) Jan de Mulder	(Netherlands) Karin Duijvestijn			
1981	(West Germany) Michael Schnaase	(Netherlands) Paula Kloet			
1982	(Wales) Philip Sutton	(England) Karen Beckman			
1983	(England) Kevin Jolly	(Netherlands) Marjan Ridder	(West Germany) Thomas Künstler (West Germany) Stefan Frey	(Netherlands) Marja Ravelli (Netherlands) Marjan Ridder	No competition
1984	(England) Glen Milton	(England) Wendy Massam	(Denmark) Peter Buch (Denmark) Niels Hansen	(England) Lisa Chapman (England) Wendy Massam	(Netherlands) Rob Ridder (Netherlands) Marjan Ridder
1985	(Denmark) Kim Brodersen	(England) Wendy Poulton	(Denmark) Peter Buch (Denmark) Niels Hansen	(England) Wendy Poulton (England) June Shipman	(England) Richard Outterside (England) Wendy Poulton
1986	(England) Steve Baddeley	(China) Xiao Jie	(China) He Xiangyang (China) Tang Hui	(Netherlands) Eline Coene (Netherlands) Erica van Dijck	(Scotland) Billy Gilliland (England) Nora Perry
1987	(Denmark) Morten Frost	(Netherlands) Astrid van der Knaap	(Denmark) Michael Kjeldsen (Denmark) Jens Peter Nierhoff	(England) Gillian Gilks (England) Gillian Gowers	(England) Martin Dew (England) Gillian Gilks
1988	(Denmark) Morten Frost	(Sweden) Christine Magnusson	(Denmark) Michael Kjeldsen (Denmark) Jens Peter Nierhoff	(South Korea) Kim Yun-ja (South Korea) Yoo Sang-hee	(Denmark) Steen Fladberg (England) Gillian Clark
1989	(Denmark) Poul-Erik Høyer Larsen	(China) Tang Jiuhong	(China) Zhang Qiang (China) Zhou Jincan	(Sweden) Maria Bengtsson (Sweden) Christine Magnusson	(Denmark) Jan Paulsen (England) Gillian Gowers

== Performances by nation ==
As of the 2026 edition

Pos	Nation	MS	WS	MD	WD	XD	Total
1	Netherlands	1	8	5.5	8	9	31.5
2	Denmark	6	3	5.5	3.5	5.5	23.5
3	England	1	2	4	5	7	19
4	Germany	5	5	4	2.5	2	18.5
5	Japan	3	1	0	4	2	10
6	Malaysia	4	2	2.5	0	1	9.5
7	South Africa	1	1	2	1.5	3	8.5
8	Indonesia	3	2	2.5	0	0	7.5
9	France	4	1	0	1	1	7
10	Chinese Taipei	1	1	2	0	0	4
10	Russia	0	0	0	2	2	4
10	Scotland	0	1	1.5	1.5	0	4
13	Belgium*	1	0	1	1	0.5	3.5
13	Bulgaria	0	1	0	2.5	0	3.5
13	Singapore	1	0	0.5	1	1	3.5
16	India	1	1	1	0	0	3
17	Poland	0	0	1.5	0	1	2.5
18	Czechoslovakia	0	1	0	1	0	2
18	Sweden	1	0	0.5	0.5	0	2
20	Wales	1	0	0.5	0	0	1.5
21	Austria	1	0	0	0	0	1
21	Canada	0	1	0	0	0	1
21	Spain	0	1	0	0	0	1
21	Turkey	0	1	0	0	0	1
21	Ukraine	0	1	0	0	0	1
21	Vietnam	0	1	0	0	0	1
27	Mexico	0	0	0.5	0	0	0.5
Total		35	35	35	35	35	175

* Host nation
