= Swedish National Badminton Championships =

Badminton tournament in Sweden

The Swedish National Badminton Championships is a tournament organized to crown the best badminton players in Sweden.

The tournament started in the season 1936/1937 and is held every year.

== Past winners ==
Season	Men's singles	Women's singles	Men's doubles	Women's doubles	Mixed doubles
1936/1937	Bengt Polling, Malmö BK	Thyra Hedvall, SBK	Bengt Polling; Thore Sjögren, Malmö BK	Thyra Hedvall; Märtha Sköld, SBK	Curt-Eric Walldow; Edith Persson, BK-33 Malmö
1937/1938	Bengt Polling, Malmö BK	Thyra Hedvall, SBK	Sture Ericsson; Gösta Kjellberg, Brandkåren; SBK	Thyra Hedvall; Märtha Sköld, SBK	Bengt Polling; Gulli Paulsson, Malmö BK
1938/1939	Sture Ericsson, Brandkåren	Thyra Hedvall, Försäkringen	Sture Ericsson; Gösta Kjellberg, Brandkåren; SBK	Thyra Hedvall; Carin Stridbäck, Försäkringsmännen	Bertil Jönsson; Britt Pahle, BK-33 Malmö
1939/1940	Sven Malmfält, Malmö BK	Evy Holmgren, BK Smash	Sven Malmfält; Helge Paulsson, Malmö BK	Brita Bergström; Thyra Hedvall, Försäkringsmännen	Sture Ericsson; Britta Bergström, Brandkåren; Försäkringsmännen
1940/1941	Sven Malmfält, MAI	Evy Holmgren, BK Smash	Sven Malmfält; Helge Paulsson, MAI	Thyra Hedvall; Carin Stridbäck, Försäkringsmännen	Sture Ericsson; Britta Bergström, Brandkåren; Försäkringsmännen
1941/1942	Hasse Petersson, BK-33 Malmö	Martha Holmström, BK Aura	Sture Ericsson; Gösta Kjellberg, Brandkåren; SBK	Thyra Hedvall; Carin Stridbäck, Försäkringsmännen	Bertil Jönsson; Britt Pahle, BK-33 Malmö
1942/1943	Hasse Petersson, BK-33 Malmö	Thyra Hedvall, SBK	Helge Paulsson; Bengt Polling, Malmö BK	Thyra Hedvall; Märtha Sköld, SBK	Sven Malmfält; Greta Lindahl, MAI
1943/1944	Hasse Petersson, BK-33 Malmö	Amy Pettersson, MAI	Helge Paulsson; Bengt Polling, Malmö BK	Thyra Hedvall; Märtha Sköld, SBK	Knut Malmgren; Elsy Killick, MAI
1944/1945	Hasse Petersson, BK-33 Malmö	Carin Stridbeck, Fjäderbollen	Nils Jonson; Anders Salén, BK Eken; SBK	Elsy Killick; Amy Pettersson, MAI	Olle Wahlberg; Thyra Hedvall, SBK
1945/1946	Helge Paulsen, Malmö BK	Amy Pettersson, MAI	Nils Jonson; Lars Carlsson, AIK	Thyra Hedvall; Märtha Sköld, SBK	Nils Jonson; Kerstin Bergström, AIK
1946/1947	Helge Paulsen, Malmö BK	Carin Stridbeck, Fjäderbollen	Nils Jonson; Lars Carlsson, AIK	Thyra Hedvall; Märtha Sköld, SBK	Nils JonsonSigne Håkansson, AIK; BK Aura
1947/1948	Olle Wahlberg, AIK	Amy Pettersson, MAI	Nils Jonson; Lars Carlsson, AIK	Margareta Blomqvist; Carin Stridbäck, Fjäderbollen	Knut Malmgren; Berit Nilsson, MAI
1948/1949	Nils Jonson, AIK	Berit Nilsson, MAI	Helge Paulsson; Bengt Polling, Malmö BK	Berit Nilsson; Amy Pettersson, MAI	Knut Malmgren; Elsy Killick, MAI
1949/1950	Inge Blomberg, MAI	Amy Pettersson, MAI	Nils Jonson; Olle Wahlberg, AIK	Thyra Hedvall; Carin Ternström, SBK; Fjäderbollen	Knut Malmgren; Elsy Killick, MAI
1950/1951	Inge Blomberg, MAI	Thora Löfgren, Göteborgs BK	Nils Jonson; Stellan Mohlin, AIK	Kerstin Bergström; Bodil Sterner, AIK	Knut Malmgren; Elsy Killick, MAI
1951/1952	Nils Jonson, AIK	Amy Pettersson, MAI	Nils Jonson; Stellan Mohlin, AIK	Astrid Löfgren; Tora Löfgren, Göteborgs BK	Knut Malmgren; Elsy Killick, MAI
1952/1953	Nils Jonson, AIK	Ulla-Britt Schelin, ÖIS	Nils Jonson; Stellan Mohlin, AIK	Bodil Sterner; Kerstin Ståhl, AIK	Stellan Mohlin; Kerstin Ståhl, AIK
1953/1954	Leif Ekedahl, Göteborgs BK	Ulla-Britt Schelin, ÖIS	Nils Jonson; Stellan Mohlin, AIK	Ingrid Dahlberg; Thyra Hedvall, SBK	Knut Malmgren; Elsy Killick, MAI
1954/1955	Leif Ekedahl, Göteborgs BK	Berit Olsson, MAI	Nils Jonson; Stellan Mohlin, AIK	Berit Olsson; Amy Pettersson, MAI	Knut Malmgren; Elsy Killick, MAI
1955/1956	Leif Ekedahl, Göteborgs BK	Berit Olsson, MFF	Nils Jonson; Stellan Mohlin, AIK	Inger Nilsson; Berit Olsson, MAI	Bertil Glans; Berit Olsson, Halmstad BK; MFF
1956/1957	Ingemar Eliasson, Halmstad BK	Berit Olsson, MFF	Knut Malmgren; Bo Nilsson, MAI	Inger Nilsson; Berit Olsson, MFF	Berndt Dahlberg; Ingrid Dahlberg, SBK
1957/1958	Bertil Glans, Halmstad BK	Berit Olsson, BK Aura	Bo Nilsson; Göran Wahlqvist, MAI; BK Smash	Ingrid Dahlberg; Berit Olsson, SBK; BK Aura	Bertil Glans; Berit Olsson, Halmstad BK; BK Aura
1958/1959	Bertil Glans, Halmstad BK	Berit Olsson, BK Aura	Bo Nilsson; Göran Wahlqvist, MAI; BK Smash	Ingrid Dahlberg; Berit Olsson, SBKBK Aura	Bertil Glans; Berit Olsson, Halmstad BK; BK Aura
1959/1960	Berndt Dahlberg, SBK	Eva Pettersson, BK Bollen	Berndt Dahlberg; Bertil Glans, SBK; Halmstad BK	Inger Nilsson; Bodil Sterner, MFF; Blackeberg	Bertil Glans; Berit Olsson, Halmstad BK; BK Aura
1960/1961	Leif Ekedahl, Göteborgs BK	Eva Pettersson, BK Bollen	Bengt-Åke Jönsson; Göran Wahlqvist, BK Smash	Berit Olsson; Ingrid Persson, BK Aura; SBK	Bengt-Åke Jönsson; Anita Billberg, BK Smash
1961/1962	Bertil Glans, Halmstad BK	Eva Pettersson, Ystads BK	Bengt-Åke Jönsson; Göran Wahlqvist, BK Smash	Lisbeth Friberg; Eva Pettersson, BK Drive; Ystads BK	Göran Wahlqvist; Eva Pettersson, BK Smash; Ystads BK
1962/1963	Bertil Glans, Halmstad BK	Gunilla Dahlström, AIK	Berndt Dahlberg; Bertil Glans, SBK; Halmstad BK	Berit Andersson; Gunilla Dahlström, MAI; AIK	Göran Wahlqvist; Eva Pettersson, BK Smash; Ystads BK
1963/1964	Kurt Johnsson, Hisingen	Eva Pettersson, Ystads BK	Berndt Dahlberg; Bertil Glans, SBK; Halmstad BK	Gunilla Dahlström; Eva Pettersson, AIK; Ystads BK	Willy Lund; Eva Pettersson, MAI; Ystads BK
1964/1965	Sture Johnsson, Hisingen	Eva Pettersson, Ystads BK	Willy Lund; Benny Wihlborg, MAI	Ann-Christine Rosenquist; Eva Twedberg, BK Aura; Ystads BK	Bengt-Åke Jönsson; Gunilla Dahlström, BK Smash; AIK
1965/1966	Sture Johnsson, Hisingen	Eva Twedberg, MAI	Willy Lund; Göran Wahlqvist, MAI	Ann-Christine Rosenquist; Eva Twedberg, BK Aura; MAI	Göran Wahlqvist; Eva Twedberg, MAI
1966/1967	Sture Johnsson, Hisingen	Eva Twedberg, MAI	Willy Lund; Göran Wahlqvist, MAI	Berit Ek; Eva Twedberg, MAI	Göran Wahlqvist; Eva Twedberg, MAI
1967/1968	Sture Johnsson, Hisingen	Eva Twedberg, MAI	Rolf Hansson; Gert Nordqvist, BK Aura	Berit Ek; Eva Twedberg, MAI	Göran Wahlqvist; Eva Twedberg, MAI
1968/1969	Kurt Johnsson, Hisingen	Eva Twedberg, MAI	Willy Lund; Göran Wahlqvist, MAI	Ann-Christine Rosenquist; Eva Twedberg, BK Aura; MAI	Göran Wahlqvist; Eva Twedberg, MAI
1969/1970	Sture Johnsson, Hisingen	Eva Twedberg, MAI	Sture Johnsson; Gert Perneklo, Hisingen; BK Aura	Lena Andersson; Eva Twedberg, MAI	Kurt Johnsson; Karin Lindquist, Hisingen; BK Eken
1970/1971	Sture Johnsson, Spårvägen	Eva Twedberg, MAI	Willy Lund; Göran Wahlqvist, MAI	Ingrid Nilsson; Eva Twedberg, MAI	Gert Perneklo; Eva Twedberg, MAI
1971/1972	Sture Johnsson, Spårvägen	Eva Twedberg, MAI	Sture Johnsson; Gert Perneklo, Spårvägen; BK Aura	Ingrid Nilsson; Eva Twedberg, MAI	Gert Perneklo; Eva Twedberg, MAI
1972/1973	Sture Johnsson, Spårvägen	Anette Börjesson, GBK	Bengt Fröman; Thomas Kihlström, IFK Lidingö	Anette Börjesson; Karin Lindquist, GBK; Spårvägen	Willy Lund; Britt-Marie Larsson, MAI
1973/1974	Sture Johnsson, Spårvägen	Eva Stuart, MAI	Bengt Fröman; Thomas Kihlström, IFK Lidingö; Farsta BK	Britt-Marie Larsson; Eva Stuart, MAI	Gert Perneklo; Eva Stuart, MAI
1974/1975	Sture Johnsson, Spårvägen	Anette Börjesson, GBK	Bengt Fröman; Thomas Kihlström, IFK Lidingö; Farsta BK	Anette Börjesson; Ewa Carlander, GBK	Bengt Fröman; Karin Lindquist, IFK Lidingö
1975/1976	Thomas Kihlström, Lidingö	Eva Stuart, MFF; MAI	Bengt Fröman; Thomas Kihlström, IFK Lidingö	Karin Lindquist; Eva Stuart, IFK Lidingö; MFF; MAI	Claes Nordin; Anette Börjesson, GBK
1976/1977	Sture Johnsson, Spårvägen	Anette Börjesson, GBK	Bengt Fröman; Thomas Kihlström, IFK Lidingö	Britt-Marie Larsson; Agneta Lundh, MFF	Lars Wengberg; Anette Börjesson, BK Aura; GBK
1977/1978	Thomas Kihlström, Täby IS	Cecilia Jeppson, BK Aura	Bengt Fröman; Thomas Kihlström, IFK Lidingö; Täby IS	Britt-Marie Larsson; Agneta Lundh, MFF	Lars Wengberg; Karin Lindquist, BK Aura; IFK Lidingö
1978/1979	Sture Johnsson, Malmö FF	Anette Börjesson, GBK	Bengt Fröman; Thomas Kihlström, IFK Lidingö	Lena Axelsson; Karin Lindquist, IFK Lidingö	Lars Wengberg; Anette Börjesson, BK Aura; GBK
1979/1980	Thomas Kihlström, Lidingö	Anette Börjesson, GBK	Stefan Karlsson; Claes Nordin, BK Aura; GBK	Lena Axelsson; Karin Lindquist, IFK Lidingö	Lars Wengberg; Anette Börjesson, BK Aura; GBK
1980/1981	Thomas Kihlström, BKC	Lena Axelsson, IFK Lidingö	Stefan Karlsson; Thomas Kihlström, BK Aura; BKC	Carina Andersson; Cecilia Jeppson, BK Aura	Lars Wengberg; Anette Börjesson, BK Aura; GBK
1981/1982	Thomas Kihlström, BKC	Maria Bengtsson, Malmö BMK	Stefan Karlsson; Thomas Kihlström, BK Aura; BKC	Maria Bengtsson; Christine Magnusson, Malmö BMK; Täby BMF	Lars Wengberg; Anette Börjesson, BK Aura; GBK
1982/1983	Ulf Johansson, BK Aura	Christine Magnusson, BKC	Stefan Karlsson; Thomas Kihlström, BK Aura; BKC	Maria Bengtsson; Christine Magnusson, Malmö BMK; BKC	Thomas Kihlström; Christine Magnusson, BKC
1983/1984	Stefan Karlsson, BK Aura	Christine Magnusson, BKC	Stefan Karlsson; Thomas Kihlström, BK Aura; BKC	Maria Bengtsson; Christine Magnusson, BK Aura; BKC	Thomas Kihlström; Christine Magnusson, BKC
1984/1985	Stefan Karlsson, BK Aura	Christine Magnusson, BKC	Stefan Karlsson; Thomas Kihlström, BK Aura; BKC	Maria Bengtsson; Christine Magnusson, BK Aura; BKC	Thomas Kihlström; Christine Magnusson, BKC
1985/1986	Ulf Johansson, BK Aura	Charlotta Wihlborg, BK Aura	Jan-Eric Antonsson; Pär-Gunnar Jönsson, BKC; Västra Frölunda BK	Maria Bengtsson; Christine Magnusson, BK Aura; BKC	Thomas Kihlström; Christine Magnusson, BKC
1986/1987	Ulf Johansson, Göteborgs BK	Christine Magnusson, BKC	Stefan Karlsson; Thomas Kihlström, BK Aura; BKC	Maria Bengtsson; Christine Magnusson, BK Aura; BKC	Thomas Kihlström; Christine Magnusson, BKC
1987/1988	Jens Olsson, Göteborgs BK	Christine Magnusson, Spårvägen	Jan-Eric Antonsson; Pär-Gunnar Jönsson, BKC; Västra Frölunda BK	Maria Bengtsson; Christine Magnusson, BK Aura; Spårvägen	Thomas Kihlström; Christine Magnusson, Spårvägen
1988/1989	Jonas Herrgårdh, Göteborgs BK	Christine Magnusson, Spårvägen	Jan-Eric Antonsson; Pär-Gunnar Jönsson, BKC; Västra Frölunda BK	Maria Bengtsson; Christine Magnusson, BK Aura; Spårvägen	Jens Olsson; Catrine Bengtsson, GBK
1989/1990	Pär-Gunnar Jönsson, Västra Frölunda BK	Christine Magnusson, Spårvägen	Peter Axelsson; Mikael Rosén, Täby BMF; BK Aura	Maria Bengtsson; Christine Magnusson, BK Aura; Spårvägen	Jan-Eric Antonsson; Maria Bengtsson, BKC; BK Aura
1990/1991	Jens Olsson, Spårvägen	Catrine Bengtsson, GBK	Peter Axelsson; Pär-Gunnar Jönsson, Täby BMF; Västra Frölunda BK	Catrine Bengtsson; Maria Bengtsson, GBK; BK Aura	Pär-Gunnar Jönsson; Maria Bengtsson, Västra Frölunda BK; BK Aura
1991/1992	Peter Axelsson, Täby BMF	Lim Xiaoqing, Spårvägen	Peter Axelsson; Pär-Gunnar Jönsson, Täby BMF; Västra Frölunda BK	Catrine Bengtsson; Maria Bengtsson, GBK; BK Aura	Pär-Gunnar Jönsson; Maria Bengtsson, Västra Frölunda BK; BK Aura
1992/1993	Tomas Johansson, Västra Frölunda BK	Lim Xiaoqing, BK Aura	Peter Axelsson; Pär-Gunnar Jönsson, Täby BMF; Västra Frölunda BK	Lim Xiaoqing; Christine Magnusson, BK Aura; Täby BMF	Pär-Gunnar Jönsson; Maria Bengtsson, Västra Frölunda BK; BK Aura
1993/1994	Jens Olsson, Göteborgs BK	Lim Xiaoqing, BK Aura	Peter Axelsson; Pär-Gunnar Jönsson, Täby BMF; Göteborgs BK	Lim Xiaoqing; Christine Magnusson, BK Aura; Täby BMF	Jan-Eric Antonsson; Astrid Crabo, BKC; Täby BMF
1994/1995	Jens Olsson, Göteborgs BK	Lim Xiaoqing, BK Aura	Peter Axelsson; Pär-Gunnar Jönsson, Täby BMF; Göteborgs BK	Maria Bengtsson; Margit Borg, BK Aura; Malmö BK	Jan-Eric Antonsson; Astrid Crabo, BKC; Täby BMF
1995/1996	Jens Olsson, Västra Frölunda BK	Marina Andrievskaya, GBK	Peter Axelsson; Pär-Gunnar Jönsson, Täby BMF; Göteborgs BK	Astrid Crabo; Susann Jacobsson, Täby BMF	Peter Axelsson; Catrine Bengtsson, Täby BMF; Askim BC
1996/1997	Rikard Magnusson, BK Aura	Marina Andrievskaya, GBK	Peter Axelsson; Pär-Gunnar Jönsson, Täby BMF; Västra Frölunda BK	Marina Andrievskaya; Christine Gandrup, GBK; Täby BMF	Peter Axelsson; Catrine Bengtsson, Täby BMF; Askim BC
1997/1998	Daniel Eriksson, Västra Frölunda BK	Marina Andrievskaya, GBK	Peter Axelsson; Pär-Gunnar Jönsson, Täby BMF; Västra Frölunda BK	Marina Andrievskaya; Catrine Bengtsson, GBK; Askim BC	Robert Larsson; Margit Borg, Malmö BK
1998/1999	Rikard Magnusson, BK Aura	Margit Borg, Malmö BK	Peter Axelsson; Pär-Gunnar Jönsson, Täby BMF	Kristin Evernäs; Jenny Karlsson, Askim BC; GBK	Fredrik Bergström; Jenny Karlsson, IFK Umeå; GBK
1999/2000	Tomas Johansson, Västra Frölunda BK	Marina Andrievskaya, Uppsala KFUM	Peter Axelsson; Pär-Gunnar Jönsson, Täby BMF	Jenny Karlsson; Anna Lundin, IFK Umeå; Täby BMF	Fredrik Bergström; Jenny Karlsson, IFK Umeå
2000/2001	George Rimarcdi, Uppsala KFUM	Marina Andrievskaya, Uppsala KFUM	Peter Axelsson; Pär-Gunnar Jönsson, Täby BMF	Marina Andrievskaya; Christine Gandrup, Uppsala KFUM; Täby BMF	Fredrik Bergström; Jenny Karlsson, IFK Umeå
2001/2002	Daniel Eriksson, Västra Frölunda BK	Sara Persson, Täby BMF	Henrik Andersson; Fredrik Bergström, Västra Frölunda BK; IFK Umeå	Johanna Persson; Elin Bergblom, Täby BMF	Daniel Glaser; Johanna Persson, Täby BMF
2002/2003	Rasmus Wengberg, IFK Umeå	Marina Andrievskaya, Uppsala KFUM	Henrik Andersson; Fredrik Bergström, IFK Umeå	Johanna Persson; Elin Bergblom, Täby BMF	Jörgen Olsson; Frida Andreasson, Göteborgs BK
2003/2004	George Rimarcdi, Uppsala KFUM	Marina Andrievskaya, Uppsala KFUM	Henrik Andersson; Fredrik Bergström, IFK Umeå	Johanna Persson; Frida Andreasson, Täby BMF; GBK	Fredrik Bergström; Johanna Persson, IFK Umeå; Täby BMF
2004/2005	Daniel Eriksson, Västra Frölunda BK	Sara Persson, Täby BMF	Henrik Andersson; Ola Molin, IFK Umeå	Elin Bergblom; Johanna Persson, Uppsala KFUM; Täby BMF	Jörgen Olsson; Johanna Persson, Askim BC; Täby BMF
2005/2006	George Rimarcdi, Uppsala KFUM	Sara Persson, GBK	Joakim Andersson; Zhang Yi, Täby BMF	Elin Bergblom; Johanna Persson, Uppsala KFUM; GBK	Henri Hurskainen; Johanna Persson BK Aura/GBK
2006/2007	George Rimarcdi, Uppsala KFUM	Sara Persson, GBK	Imam Sodikin; Imanuel Hirschfeld, Uppsala KFUM	Lina Alfredsson; Lina Uhac, Malmö BK; Västra Frölunda BK	Imam Sodikin; Elin Bergblom, Uppsala KFUM
2007/2008	Magnus Sahlberg, Västra Frölunda BK	Sara Persson, GBK	Tim Foo; Andy Hartono, Uppsala KFUM	Elin Bergblom; Johanna Persson, Uppsala KFUM; GBK	Per-Henrik Croona; Johanna Persson, Karlskoga; GBK
2008/2009	Henri Hurskainen, Malmö BK	Zhang Xi, Täby BMF	George Rimcardi; Rizal Fadlillah, Kista BMK	Emelie Lennartsson; Emma Wengberg, BK Carlskrona; Malmö BK	Björn Fredriksson; Elin Bergblom, Uppsala KFUM
2009/2010	Kristian Karttunen, Göteborgs BK	Zhang Xi, Täby BMF	Gert Künka; Andy Hartono, Uppsala KFUM	Emelie Lennartsson; Emma Wengberg, BK Carlskrona; Malmö BK	Joakim Andersson; Zhang Xi, Täby BMF
2010/2011	Henri Hurskainen, Malmö BK	Christine Pettersson, Skogås BK	Gert Künka; Andi Hartono, Uppsala KFUM	Emelie Lennartsson; Emma Wengberg, BK Carlskrona; Malmö BK	Gert Künka; Amanda Högström, Uppsala KFUM
2011/2012	Henri Hurskainen, Malmö BK	Elin Bergblom, Uppsala KFUM	Magnus Sahlberg; Joel Johansson-Berg, BK Carlskrona; Kista BMK	Emelie Lennartsson; Emma Wengberg, BK Carlskrona; Malmö BK	Andi Hartono; Elin Bergblom, Uppsala KFUM
2013	Gabriel Ulldahl; Västra Frölunda BK	Matilda Petersen; BMK Aura	Patrik Lundqvist; Jonathan Nordh; Malmö BK; BK Carlskrona	Emelie Lennartsson; Emma Wengberg; BK Carlskrona; Malmö BK	Jonathan Nordh; Emelie Lennartsson; BK Carlskrona
2014	Henri Hurskainen	Ellinor Widh	Richard Eidestedt; Andi Hartono	Emelie Lennartsson; Emma Wengberg	Jonathan Nordh; Emelie Lennartsson
2015	Gabriel Ulldahl	Ellinor Widh	Richard Eidestedt; Tim Foo	Clara Nistad; Moa Sjöö	Nico Ruponen; Amanda Högström
2016	Gabriel Ulldahl	Larissa Griga	Sebastian Gransbo; Peder Nordin	Clara Nistad; Emma Wengberg	Filip Myhren; Emma Wengberg
2017	Mattias Borg	Emma Karlsson	Richard Eidestedt; Nico Ruponen	Emma Karlsson; Johanna Magnusson	Nico Ruponen; Amanda Högström
2018	Gabriel Ulldahl	Ashwathi Pillai	Richard Eidestedt; Tim Foo	Emma Karlsson; Johanna Magnusson	Richard Eidestedt; Clara Nistad
2019	Hermansah	Ashwathi Pillai	Richard Eidestedt; Andi Tandaputra	Emma Karlsson; Johanna Magnusson	Melker Zickerman Bexell; Tilda Sjöö
2020	Felix Burestedt	Edith Urell	Richard Eidestedt Andi Tandaputra	Emma Karlsson; Johanna Magnusson	Melker Zickerman Bexell Tilda Sjöö
