= 2022 BWF World Championships qualification =

This is the list of entries for the 2022 BWF World Championships qualification.

== Overview ==
=== Events ===
==== Number of players/member association quota ====
This event's total limit of eligibility players is 400 players, the following charts are the rules and the distribution.

	Men's singles	Women's singles	Men's doubles	Women's doubles	Mixed doubles	Total
Entry limits	64 players	48 players	96 players (48 pairs)	96 players (48 pairs)	96 players (48 pairs)	400 players

Players/pairs ranked on date eligible	Total number of players/pairs from any one Member Association in that event must not exceed
1 to 8	4
9 to 24	3
25 to 150	2

== Participating players ==
=== Men's singles ===
According to the phase 2 updated by BWF, the following table is the invitation results.

Players who ranked from 1 to 8, whose association could nominate 4 players.
Players who ranked from 9 to 24, whose association could nominate 3 players.
Players who ranked from 25 to 150, whose association could nominate 2 players.

Rank	Nation / Player	Points	Eligibility		Note
1	(Denmark) Viktor Axelsen	118,579	1	Denmark (1)	BE highest ranked
2	(Japan) Kento Momota	112,210	2	Japan (1)	BA highest ranked, Host nation presenter
3	(Denmark) Anders Antonsen	98,300	3	Denmark (2)	
4	(Chinese Taipei) Chou Tien-chen	93,282	4	Chinese Taipei (1)	
5	(Indonesia) Anthony Sinisuka Ginting	87,567	5	Indonesia (1)	
6	(China) Chen Long	84,400		~~China~~	Decline participation (on 6 July 2022)
7	(Malaysia) Lee Zii Jia	81,164	6	Malaysia (1)	
8	(Indonesia) Jonatan Christie	79,247	7	Indonesia (2)	
9	(India) Lakshya Sen	74,786	8	India (1)	
10	(Singapore) Loh Kean Yew	70,506	9	Singapore (1)	
11	(India) Srikanth Kidambi	70,378	10	India (2)	
12	(Hong Kong) Ng Ka Long	70,257	11	Hong Kong (1)	
13	(Denmark) Rasmus Gemke	68,203	12	Denmark (3)	
14	(Japan) Kanta Tsuneyama	65,485	13	Japan (2)	
15	(Chinese Taipei) Wang Tzu-wei	65,042	14	Chinese Taipei (2)	
16	(China) Shi Yuqi	64,941	15	China (1)	
17	(Hong Kong) Lee Cheuk Yiu	63,781	16	Hong Kong (2)	
18	(Thailand) Kunlavut Vitidsarn	60,432	17	Thailand (1)	
19	(India) B. Sai Praneeth	59,276	18	India (3)	
20	(Japan) Kenta Nishimoto	58,243	19	Japan (3)	
21	(Thailand) Kantaphon Wangcharoen	56,723	20	Thailand (2)	
22	(Denmark) Hans-Kristian Vittinghus	56,217	56	Denmark (4)	Reserve 1
23	(India) Prannoy Kumar	52,875	57	India (4)	Reserve 2
24	(Indonesia) Shesar Hiren Rhustavito	52,518		~~Indonesia~~	Withdrawn (on 5 August 2022)
25	(China) Lu Guangzu	51,669	21	China (2)	
26	(Netherlands) Mark Caljouw	51,119	22	Netherlands (1)	
27	(India) Sameer Verma	49,889		India	Reserve 3
28	(France) Toma Junior Popov	48,886	23	France (1)	
29	(Indonesia) Tommy Sugiarto	48,400	58	Indonesia (3)	Reserve 4
30	(South Korea) Heo Kwang-hee	48,294	24	South Korea (1)	
31	(Thailand) Sitthikom Thammasin	48,157	59	Thailand (3)	Reserve 5
32	(Denmark) Jan Ø. Jørgensen	47,664		Denmark	Reserve 6
33	(Canada) Brian Yang	47,048		~~Canada~~	BPA highest ranked, Decline participation (on 8 August 2022)
34	(China) Huang Yuxiang	45,000		~~China~~	Reserve 7, Decline participation
35	(Malaysia) Liew Daren	44,300	25	Malaysia (2)	
36	(India) Parupalli Kashyap	44,290		India	Reserve 8
37	(China) Zhao Junpeng	44,005	60	China (3)	Reserve 9
38	(India) Sourabh Verma	42,400		India	Reserve 10
39	(France) Brice Leverdez	41,324	26	France (2)	
40	(Guatemala) Kevin Cordón	40,937	27	Guatemala (1)	
41	(France) Thomas Rouxel	40,870		France	Reserve 11
42	(Republic of Ireland) Nhat Nguyen	40,150	28	Ireland (1)	
43	(Thailand) Khosit Phetpradab	39,793		~~Thailand~~	Reserve 12, Decline participation (on 9 August 2022)
44	(Malaysia) Ng Tze Yong	39,478	61	Malaysia (3)	Reserve 13
45	(Japan) Kodai Naraoka	32,276	62	Japan (4)	Reserve 14
46	(Japan) Koki Watanabe	39,146		Japan	Reserve 15
47	(Thailand) Tanongsak Saensomboonsuk	36,460		~~Thailand~~	Reserve 16, Decline participation (on 9 August 2022)
48	(Israel) Misha Zilberman	36,304	29	Israel (1)	
49	(Canada) Jason Ho-Shue	35,319	30	Canada (1)	
50	(Brazil) Ygor Coelho	34,849	31	Brazil (1)	
51	(England) Toby Penty	34,289	32	England (1)	
52	(Indonesia) Chico Aura Dwi Wardoyo	34,118	63	Indonesia (4)	Reserve 17
53	(Hong Kong) Wong Wing Ki	34,050	64	Hong Kong (3)	Reserve 18
54	(China) Sun Feixiang	33,690		China	Reserve 19
55	(Malaysia) Soong Joo Ven	33,430		Malaysia	Reserve 20
56	(France) Christo Popov	33,300		France	Reserve 21
57	(France) Lucas Claerbout	33,284		France	Reserve 22
58	(Spain) Pablo Abián	33,280	33	Spain (1)	
59	(Denmark) Victor Svendsen	33,130		Denmark	
60	(France) Arnaud Merklé	33,043		France	
61	(India) Subhankar Dey	32,825		India	
62	(South Korea) Lee Dong-keun	32,655		~~South Korea~~	Decline participation
63	(Thailand) Suppanyu Avihingsanon	32,486		Thailand	
64	(China) Li Shifeng	32,307		China	
65	(Sweden) Felix Burestedt	32,261	34	Sweden (1)	
66	(South Korea) Son Wan-ho	32,185		~~South Korea~~	Decline participation
67	(Finland) Kalle Koljonen	31,712	35	Finland (1)	
68	(Germany) Max Weißkirchen	31,066	36	Germany (1)	
69	(Malaysia) Cheam June Wei	30,850		Malaysia	
70	(India) Kiran George	30,587		India	
71	(India) Ajay Jayaram	30,050		India	
72	(Spain) Luís Enrique Peñalver	29,660	37	Spain	
73	(Russia) Sergey Sirant	29,474		~~Russia~~	Not eligible
74	(India) Mithun Manjunath	29,441		India	
75	(Vietnam) Nguyễn Tiến Minh	28,955	38	Vietnam (1)	
76	(Canada) Xiaodong Sheng	28,730		Canada	
77	(Denmark) Mads Christophersen	28,730		Denmark	
78	(Azerbaijan) Ade Resky Dwicahyo	27,036	29	Azerbaijan (1)	
79	(Mexico) Lino Muñoz	26,468	40	Mexico (1)	
80	(Denmark) Kim Bruun	20,630		Denmark	
81	(China) Weng Hongyang	25,958		China	
82	(Germany) Kai Schäfer	25,880	41	Germany (2)	
83	(India) Priyanshu Rajawat	25,260		India	
84	(India) Siril Verma	18,470		India	
85	(South Korea) Kim Dong-hyun	24,497		South Korea	
86	(Chinese Taipei) Lin Yu-hsien	24,460		Chinese Taipei	
87	(Indonesia) Ikhsan Rumbay	24,431		Indonesia	
88	(Canada) B. R. Sankeerth	24,218		Canada	
89	(Austria) Luka Wraber	24,018	42	Austria (1)	
90	(France) Lucas Corvée	23,890		France	
91	(Chinese Taipei) Lin Chun-yi	23,600		Chinese Taipei	
92	(India) Chirag Sen	23,020		India	
93	(Singapore) Jason Teh	23,006	43	Singapore (2)	
94	(Russia) Vladimir Malkov	22,695		~~Russia~~	Not eligible
95	(Ukraine) Danylo Bosniuk	22,610	44	Ukraine (1)	
96	(Denmark) Ditlev Jæger Holm	22,590		Denmark	
97	(Netherlands) Joran Kweekel	22,199		~~Netherlands~~	Decline participation (on 23 June 2022)
98	(Czech Republic) Jan Louda	21,890	45	Czech Republic (1)	
99	(Mauritius) Julien Paul	21,830	46	Mauritius	BCA highest ranked
100	(India) Kartikey Gulshan Kumar	21,530		India	
101	(Egypt) Adham Hatem Elgamal	21,479	47	Egypt	
102	(Chinese Taipei) Lee Chia-hao	21,430		Chinese Taipei	
103	(India) Kaushal Dharmamer	21,330		India	
104	(Finland) Eetu Heino	21,110		~~Finland~~	Decline participation
105	(Malaysia) Iskandar Zulkarnain Zainuddin	21,070		Malaysia	
106	(India) Meiraba Luwang Maisnam	21,040		India	
107	(United States) Timothy Lam	20,869		~~United States~~	Decline participation
108	(Japan) Minoru Koga	20,854		Japan	
109	(Nigeria) Anuoluwapo Juwon Opeyori	20,647	48	Nigeria (1)	
110	(Estonia) Raul Must	20,543		~~Estonia~~	Decline participation
111	(Japan) Hashiru Shimono	20,540		Japan	
112	(New Zealand) Abhinav Manota	20,507	49	New Zealand (1)	
113	(Malaysia) Aidil Sholeh	20,477		Malaysia	
114	(Bulgaria) Daniel Nikolov	20,390	50	Bulgaria (1)	
115	(India) Rahul Yadav Chittaboina	20,070		India	
116	(Mexico) Luis Montoya	20,004	51	Mexico (2)	
117	(Belgium) Maxime Moreels	19,826		~~Belgium~~	Decline participation
118	(Chinese Taipei) Lu Chia-hung	19,760		Chinese Taipei	
119	(Japan) Yusuke Onodera	19,740		Japan	
120	(Mexico) Job Castillo	19,674		Mexico	
121	(Ukraine) Artem Pochtarov	19,625		~~Ukraine~~	Decline participation
122	(Malaysia) Leong Jun Hao	19,295		Malaysia	
123	(Sri Lanka) Niluka Karunaratne	19,240	52	Sri Lanka (1)	
124	(Cuba) Osleni Guerrero	19,150		~~Cuba~~	Decline participation
125	(Indonesia) Ihsan Maulana Mustofa	18,998		Indonesia	
126	(Japan) Kazumasa Sakai	18,960		Japan	
127	(Malaysia) Soo Teck Zhi	18,940		Malaysia	
128	(Poland) Michał Rogalski	18,931		~~Poland~~	Decline participation (on 8 August 2022)
129	(Belgium) Julien Carraggi	18,890	53	Belgium (1)	
130	(Malaysia) Yeoh Seng Zoe	18,670		Malaysia	
131	(Turkey) Emre Lale	18,414		~~Turkey~~	Decline participation
132	(United States) Howard Shu	18,348	54	United States (1)	
133	(Japan) Takuma Obayashi	18,260		Japan	
134	(China) Ren Pengbo	17,970		China	
135	(Japan) Yu Igarashi	17,820		Japan	
136	(Algeria) Youcef Sabri Medel	17,712		~~Algeria~~	Withdrawn (on 20 July 2022)
137	(Hong Kong) Chan Yin Chak	17,323		Hong Kong	
138	(Denmark) Magnus Johannesen	17,140		Denmark	
139	(Portugal) Bernardo Atilano	17,124	55	Portugal (1)	

=== Women's singles ===
According to the phase 2 updated by BWF, the following table is the invitation results.

Players who ranked from 1 to 8, whose association could nominate 4 players.
Players who ranked from 9 to 24, whose association could nominate 3 players.
Players who ranked from 25 to 150, whose association could nominate 2 players.

Rank	Nation / Player	Points	Eligibility		Note
1	(Chinese Taipei) Tai Tzu-ying	108,800	1	Chinese Taipei (1)	BA highest ranked
2	(Japan) Akane Yamaguchi	108,749	2	Japan (1)	Host nation presenter
3	(China) Chen Yufei	102,454	3	China (1)	
4	(South Korea) An Se-young	101,053	4	South Korea (1)	
5	(Japan) Nozomi Okuhara	95,886	5	Japan (2)	
6	(Spain) Carolina Marín	95,800	6	Spain (1)	BE highest ranked
7	(India) P. V. Sindhu	90,994	7	India (1)	
8	(Thailand) Ratchanok Intanon	86,268	8	Thailand (1)	
9	(China) He Bingjiao	80,895	9	China (2)	
10	(Thailand) Pornpawee Chochuwong	77,454	10	Thailand (2)	
11	(Thailand) Busanan Ongbamrungphan	68,954	11	Thailand (3)	
12	(Canada) Michelle Li	68,845	12	Canada (1)	BPA highest ranked
13	(Japan) Sayaka Takahashi	64,164	13	Japan (3)	
14	(Denmark) Mia Blichfeldt	62,192	14	Denmark (1)	
15	(United States) Beiwen Zhang	57,700	15	United States (1)	
16	(China) Wang Zhiyi	56,415	16	China (3)	
17	(Singapore) Yeo Jia Min	56,360	17	Singapore (1)	
18	(South Korea) Kim Ga-eun	54,218	18	South Korea (2)	
19	(South Korea) Sung Ji-hyun	54,010		~~South Korea~~	Decline participation
20	(Scotland) Kirsty Gilmour	53,720	19	Scotland (1)	
21	(Thailand) Phittayaporn Chaiwan	52,381	42	Thailand (4)	Reserve 1
22	(Denmark) Line Christophersen	51,275	20	Denmark (2)	
23	(India) Saina Nehwal	50,457	21	India (2)	
24	(China) Han Yue	50,406	43	China (4)	Reserve 2
25	(Germany) Yvonne Li	49,933	22	Germany (1)	
26	(Thailand) Supanida Katethong	49,523		Thailand	Reserve 3
27	(Japan) Aya Ohori	49,506	44	Japan (4)	Reserve 4
28	(Russia) Evgeniya Kosetskaya	49,140		Russia	Not eligible
29	(Indonesia) Gregoria Mariska Tunjung	48,991	23	Indonesia (1)	
30	(Turkey) Neslihan Yiğit	46,940		~~Turkey~~	Decline participation (on 22 June 2022)
31	(United States) Iris Wang	45,080	24	United States (2)	
32	(Thailand) Nitchaon Jindapol	44,677		Thailand	Reserve 5
33	(Denmark) Line Kjærsfeldt	43,651	45	Denmark (3)	Reserve 6
34	(China) Cai Yanyan	43,193		~~China~~	Reserve 7, Decline participation
35	(China) Zhang Yiman	42,960		China	Reserve 8
36	(Belgium) Lianne Tan	39,476	25	Belgium (1)	
37	(Hong Kong) Cheung Ngan Yi	39,310	26	Hong Kong (1)	
38	(Malaysia) Soniia Cheah Su Ya	39,131	27	Malaysia (1)	
39	(Chinese Taipei) Pai Yu-po	39,090	28	Chinese Taipei (2)	
40	(China) Chen Xiaoxin	38,320		~~China~~	Reserve 9, Decline participation
41	(Denmark) Julie Dawall Jakobsen	38,314		~~Denmark~~	Reserve 10, Decline participation
42	(Japan) Saena Kawakami	37,760		Japan	Reserve 11
43	(Spain) Clara Azurmendi	36,513		~~Spain~~	Decline participation (on 4 July 2022)
44	(Indonesia) Fitriani	35,614		~~Indonesia~~	Decline participation
45	(France) Qi Xuefei	34,860	29	France (1)	
46	(Indonesia) Ruselli Hartawan	34,720		~~Indonesia~~	Decline participation
47	(Japan) Asuka Takahashi	34,500		Japan	Reserve 12
48	(South Korea) Sim Yu-jin	34,195	46	South Korea (3)	Reserve 13
49	(Estonia) Kristin Kuuba	34,180	30	Estonia (1)	
50	(Thailand) Porntip Buranaprasertsuk	33,480		Thailand	Reserve 14
51	(Spain) Beatriz Corrales	32,197		~~Spain~~	Reserve 15, Decline participation
52	(India) Aakarshi Kashyap	31,919		~~India~~	Reserve 16, Decline participation
53	(Vietnam) Nguyễn Thùy Linh	31,506	31	Vietnam (1)	
54	(Japan) Natsuki Nidaira	31,361		Japan	Reserve 17
55	(France) Léonice Huet	31,246	32	France (2)	
56	(India) Malvika Bansod	31,162	47	India (3)	Reserve 18
57	(Switzerland) Sabrina Jaquet	30,769		~~Switzerland~~	Decline participation
58	(Malaysia) Kisona Selvaduray	30,736	33	Malaysia (2)	
59	(Ukraine) Marija Ulitina	30,670	34	Ukraine	
60	(South Korea) Kim Hyo-min	30,510		~~South Korea~~	Reserve 19, Decline participation
61	(Indonesia) Putri Kusuma Wardani	30,453	48	Indonesia (2)	Reserve 19
62	(Canada) Brittney Tam	30,418		~~Canada~~	Decline participation
63	(India) Ashmita Chaliha	30,185		India	
64	(France) Marie Batomene	29,941		France	
65	(India) Anupama Upadhyaya	29,920		India	
66	(Turkey) Aliye Demirbağ	29,780		~~Turkey~~	Decline participation (on 22 June 2022)
67	(United States) Lauren Lam	29,159		United States	
68	(France) Yaëlle Hoyaux	29,047		France	
69	(Vietnam) Vũ Thị Trang	28,555	35	Vietnam (2)	
70	(Bulgaria) Linda Zetchiri	27,962		~~Bulgaria~~	Decline participation (on 16 June 2022)
71	(Hong Kong) Yip Pui Yin	27,530	36	Hong Kong (2)	
72	(Poland) Jordan Hart	25,280		~~Poland~~	Not eligible
73	(Germany) Fabienne Deprez	26,922		~~Germany~~	Decline participation
74	(Israel) Ksenia Polikarpova	26,857	37	Israel (1)	
75	(Chinese Taipei) Hsu Wen-chi	26,830		Chinese Taipei	
76	(Slovakia) Martina Repiská	26,430	38	Slovakia (1)	
77	(Malaysia) Goh Jin Wei	26,084		Malaysia	
78	(Australia) Chen Hsuan-yu	25,626		~~Australia~~	BO highest ranked Decline participation (on 14 July 2022)
79	(United States) Crystal Pan	25,280		United States	
80	(Russia) Natalia Perminova	25,242		~~Russia~~	Not eligible
81	(Myanmar) Thet Htar Thuzar	25,200	39	Myanmar (1)	
82	(Canada) Wenyu Zhang	24,349	40	Canada (2)	
83	(Netherlands) Soraya de Visch Eijbergen	24,276		Netherlands	
84	(Egypt) Doha Hany	23,985	41	Egypt	BCA highest ranked

=== Men's doubles ===
According to the phase 2 updated by BWF, the following table is the invitation results.

Players who ranked from 1 to 8, whose association could nominate 4 players.
Players who ranked from 9 to 24, whose association could nominate 3 players.
Players who ranked from 25 to 150, whose association could nominate 2 players.

Rank	Nation / Player	Points	Eligibility		Note
1	(Indonesia) Marcus Fernaldi Gideon (Indonesia) Kevin Sanjaya Sukamuljo	118,827	1	Indonesia (1)	BA highest ranked
2	(Indonesia) Hendra Setiawan (Indonesia) Mohammad Ahsan	104,130	2	Indonesia (2)	
3	(Chinese Taipei) Lee Yang (Chinese Taipei) Wang Chi-lin	100,826	3	Chinese Taipei (1)	
4	(Japan) Takuro Hoki (Japan) Yugo Kobayashi	98,432	4	Japan (1)	Host nation presenter
5	(Japan) Hiroyuki Endo (Japan) Yuta Watanabe	84,863		~~Japan~~	Hiroyuki Endo has retired Decline participation
6	(Japan) Takeshi Kamura (Japan) Keigo Sonoda	84,503		~~Japan~~	Both players retired Decline participation
7	(India) Satwiksairaj Rankireddy (India) Chirag Shetty	78,118	5	India (1)	
8	(Indonesia) Fajar Alfian (Indonesia) Muhammad Rian Ardianto	78,064	6	Indonesia (3)	
9	(Malaysia) Aaron Chia (Malaysia) Soh Wooi Yik	77,231	7	Malaysia (1)	
10	(Denmark) Kim Astrup (Denmark) Anders Skaarup Rasmussen	75,634	8	Denmark (1)	BE highest ranked
11	(Malaysia) Ong Yew Sin (Malaysia) Teo Ee Yi	71,900	9	Malaysia (2)	
12	(South Korea) Choi Sol-gyu (South Korea) Seo Seung-jae	69,750	10	South Korea (1)	
13	(Malaysia) Goh V Shem (Malaysia) Tan Wee Kiong	63,730	11	Malaysia (3)	
14	(England) Marcus Ellis (England) Chris Langridge	63,304		~~England~~	Decline participation
15	(Russia) Vladimir Ivanov (Russia) Ivan Sozonov	62,025		~~Russia~~	Not eligible
16	(Malaysia) Goh Sze Fei (Malaysia) Nur Izzuddin	61,544	41	Malaysia (4)	Reserve 1
17	(Germany) Mark Lamsfuß (Germany) Marvin Seidel	61,417	12	Germany (1)	
18	(China) He Jiting (China) Tan Qiang	61,060		~~China~~	Decline participation
19	(England) Ben Lane (England) Sean Vendy	56,879	13	England (1)	
20	(Indonesia) Muhammad Shohibul Fikri (Indonesia) Bagas Maulana	56,702	42	Indonesia (4)	Reserve 2
21	(South Korea) Ko Sung-hyun (South Korea) Shin Baek-cheol	54,950		~~South Korea~~	Decline participation
22	(Indonesia) Pramudya Kusumawardana (Indonesia) Yeremia Rambitan	54,397		Indonesia	Reserve 3
23	(Japan) Akira Koga (Japan) Taichi Saito	52,701	14	Japan (2)	
24	(Indonesia) Leo Rolly Carnando (Indonesia) Daniel Marthin	50,267		Indonesia	Reserve 4
25	(Chinese Taipei) Lu Ching-yao (Chinese Taipei) Yang Po-han	49,680	15	Chinese Taipei (2)	
26	(Chinese Taipei) Liao Min-chun (Chinese Taipei) Su Ching-heng	49,026		~~Chinese Taipei~~	Decline participation
27	(China) Huang Kaixiang (China) Liu Cheng	48,520		~~China~~	Liu Cheng has retired Decline participation
28	(Denmark) Mathias Boe (Denmark) Mads Conrad-Petersen	47,629		~~Denmark~~	Decline participation
29	(China) Ou Xuanyi (China) Zhang Nan	46,520		~~China~~	Decline participation
30	(France) Christo Popov (France) Toma Junior Popov	43,479	16	France (1)	
31	(Chinese Taipei) Lee Jhe-huei (Chinese Taipei) Yang Po-hsuan	42,357	43	Chinese Taipei (3)	Reserve 6
32	(Japan) Keiichiro Matsui (Japan) Yoshinori Takeuchi	41,410	44	Japan (3)	Reserve 7
33	(Indonesia) Wahyu Nayaka (Indonesia) Ade Yusuf Santoso	40,680		Indonesia	Reserve 8
34	(Japan) Takuto Inoue (Japan) Yuki Kaneko	40,317		~~Japan~~	Reserve 9 Decline participation
35	(Canada) Jason Ho-Shue (Canada) Nyl Yakura	40,284		~~Canada~~	Decline participation
36	(Scotland) Alexander Dunn (Scotland) Adam Hall	39,400	17	Scotland (1)	
37	(South Korea) Kim Gi-jung (South Korea) Lee Yong-dae	39,320		~~South Korea~~	Decline participation
38	(India) Arjun M. R. (India) Dhruv Kapila	39,050	18	India (2)	
39	(Thailand) Supak Jomkoh (Thailand) Kittinupong Kedren	38,883	19	Thailand (1)	
40	(Germany) Jones Ralfy Jansen (Germany) Peter Käsbauer	38,788		~~Germany~~	Decline participation
41	(United States) Phillip Chew (United States) Ryan Chew	38,648		~~United States~~	Decline participation
42	(France) Fabien Delrue (France) William Villeger	37,673	20	France (2)	
43	(India) Manu Attri (India) B. Sumeeth Reddy	36,969	45	India (3)	Reserve 10
44	(Malaysia) Tee Kai Wun (Malaysia) Man Wei Chong	36,530		Malaysia	Reserve 11
45	(India) Krishna Prasad Garaga (India) Vishnuvardhan Goud Panjala	36,070	46	India (4)	Reserve 12
46	(China) Di Zijian (China) Wang Chang	36,026		~~China~~	Decline participation
47	(Netherlands) Ruben Jille (Netherlands) Ties van der Lecq	34,050	21	Netherlands (1)	
48	(Netherlands) Jelle Maas (Netherlands) Robin Tabeling	33,773		~~Netherlands~~	Decline participation
49	(England) Callum Hemming (England) Steven Stallwood	33,773	22	England (2)	
50	(Japan) Hiroki Okamura (Japan) Masayuki Onodera	32,640	47	Japan (4)	Reserve 13
51	(Denmark) Daniel Lundgaard (Denmark) Mathias Thyrri	32,470		~~Denmark~~	Decline participation
52	(South Korea) Kang Min-hyuk (South Korea) Kim Jae-hwan	32,400	23	South Korea (2)	
53	(Scotland) Christopher Grimley (Scotland) Matthew Grimley	31,580	24	Scotland (2)	
54	(France) Lucas Corvée (France) Ronan Labar	30,780	48	France (3)	Reserve 14
55	(Thailand) Bodin Isara (Thailand) Maneepong Jongjit	30,607		~~Thailand~~	Decline participation
56	(Denmark) Joel Eipe (Denmark) Rasmus Kjær	30,490		~~Denmark~~	Decline participation
57	(Denmark) Jeppe Bay (Denmark) Lasse Mølhede	30,120	25	Denmark (2)	
58	(Algeria) Koceila Mammeri (Algeria) Youcef Sabri Medel	29,599		~~Algeria~~	BCA highest ranked Withdrawn (on 20 July 2022)
59	(Japan) Mahiro Kaneko (Japan) Yunosuke Kubota	29,490		~~Japan~~	Reserve 15; Decline participation
60	(Singapore) Terry Hee (Singapore) Loh Kean Hean	28,600	26	Singapore (1)	
61	(Malaysia) Mohamad Arif Abdul Latif (Malaysia) Nur Mohd Azriyn Ayub	28,510		Malaysia	Reserve 16
62	(Republic of Ireland) Joshua Magee (Republic of Ireland) Paul Reynolds	28,500	27	Ireland (1)	
63	(Nigeria) Godwin Olofua (Nigeria) Anuoluwapo Juwon Opeyori	28,463		~~Nigeria~~	Decline participation
64	(Indonesia) Angga Pratama (Indonesia) Ricky Karanda Suwardi	28,310		Indonesia	Reserve 17
65	(Germany) Bjarne Geiss (Germany) Jan Colin Völker	28,259	28	Germany (2)	
66	(India) Arjun M. R. (India) Ramchandran Shlok	27,364		India	Reserve 18
67	(South Korea) Na Sung-seung (South Korea) Wang Chan	27,242		South Korea	Reserve 19
68	(China) Liu Cheng (China) Zhang Nan	27,210		~~China~~	Reserve 20; Liu Cheng has retired Decline participation
69	(France) Éloi Adam (France) Julien Maio	26,900		France	Reserve 21
70	(South Korea) Kim Won-ho (South Korea) Park Kyung-hoon	26,710		South Korea	Reserve 22
71	(Thailand) Nipitphon Phuangphuapet (Thailand) Tanupat Viriyangkura	26,598		~~Thailand~~	Decline participation
72	(Malaysia) Tan Kian Meng (Malaysia) Tan Wee Kiong	26,340		Malaysia	Reserve 23
73	(India) Ishaan Bhatnagar (India) K. Sai Pratheek	25,320		India	Reserve 24
74	(Norway) Torjus Flåtten (Norway) Vegard Rikheim	25,150	29	Norway (1)	
75	(England) Zach Russ (England) Rory Easton	24,880		England	
76	(Denmark) Mathias Bay-Smidt (Denmark) Lasse Mølhede	24,310		Denmark	
77	(India) Vasantha Kumar Hanumaiah Ranganatha (India) Ashith Surya	23,650		India	
78	(Malaysia) Chooi Kah Ming (Malaysia) Low Juan Shen	23,120		Malaysia	
79	(Malaysia) Junaidi Arif (Malaysia) Muhammad Haikal	22,960		Malaysia	
80	(New Zealand) Oliver Leydon-Davis (New Zealand) Abhinav Manota	22,756		~~New Zealand~~	BO highest ranked Decline participation
81	(Brazil) Fabrício Farias (Brazil) Francielton Farias	22,772	30	Brazil (1)	BPA highest ranked
82	(Indonesia) Berry Angriawan (Indonesia) Hardianto	22,560		Indonesia	
83	(Sri Lanka) Sachin Dias (Sri Lanka) Buwaneka Goonethilleka	22,534	31	Sri Lanka (1)	
84	(Denmark) Mathias Christiansen (Denmark) Niclas Nøhr	22,260		Denmark	
85	(Egypt) Adham Hatem Elgamal (Egypt) Ahmed Salah	22,001	32	Egypt (1)	
86	(England) Matthew Clare (England) Max Flynn	21,690		England	
87	(Chinese Taipei) Lin Chia-yu (Chinese Taipei) Yang Ming-tse	21,590		Chinese Taipei	
88	(India) Arun George (India) Sanyam Shukla	21,092		India	
89	(Hong Kong) Chang Tak Ching (Hong Kong) Yeung Ming Nok	21,405		~~Hong Kong~~	Decline participation
90	(Denmark) Emil Lauritzen (Denmark) Mads Muurholm	21,020		Denmark	
91	(Guatemala) Aníbal Marroquín (Guatemala) Jonathan Solís	20,726	33	Guatemala (1)	
92	(Malaysia) Ng Eng Cheong (Malaysia) Low Hang Yee	20,725		Malaysia	
93	(South Korea) Kim Duk-young (South Korea) Kim Sa-rang	20,670		South Korea	
94	(India) P. S. Ravikrishna (India) Sankar Prasad Udayakumar	20,542		India	
95	(South Korea) Kang Min-hyuk (South Korea) Seo Seung-jae	20,510		South Korea	
96	(Malaysia) Goh V Shem (Malaysia) Low Juan Shen	19,890		Malaysia	
97	(Malaysia) Shia Chun Kang (Malaysia) Tan Boon Heong	19,770		Malaysia	
98	(England) Matthew Clare (England) Ethan van Leeuwen	19,590		England	
99	(Austria) Philip Birker (Austria) Dominik Stipsits	19,566		~~Austria~~	Decline participation
100	(Australia) Simon Leung (Australia) Mitchell Wheller	19,421		~~Australia~~	Decline participation
100+
105	(Czech Republic) Jaromír Janáček (Czech Republic) Tomáš Švejda	18,500	34	Czech Republic (1)	
107	(Czech Republic) Ondřej Král (Czech Republic) Adam Mendrek	18,210	35	Czech Republic (2)	
109	(Algeria) Mohamed Abderrahime Belarbi (Algeria) Adel Hamek	17,795		~~Algeria~~	Withdrawn (on 20 July 2022)
114	(Ukraine) Glib Beketov (Ukraine) Mykhaylo Makhnovskiy	16,190	36	Ukraine (1)	
118	(Spain) Joan Monroy (Spain) Carlos Piris	15,460	37	Spain (1)	
120	(Netherlands) Jacco Arends (Netherlands) Ruben Jille	14,911		~~Netherlands~~	Jacco Arends has retired Decline participation
121	(Mexico) Job Castillo (Mexico) Luis Montoya	14,906	38	Mexico (1)	
128	(Italy) Giovanni Greco (Italy) Kevin Strobl	14,041		~~Italy~~	Decline participation
134	(Mauritius) Aatish Lubah (Mauritius) Julien Paul	13,728	39	Mauritius (1)	
135	(Singapore) Danny Bawa Chrisnanta (Singapore) Loh Kean Hean	13,580		~~Singapore~~	Danny Bawa Chrisnanta has retired Decline participation
277	(New Zealand) Jonathan Curtin (New Zealand) Dylan Soedjasa	5,830	40	New Zealand (1)	Oceania continental place

=== Women's doubles ===
According to the phase 2 updated by BWF, the following table is the invitation results.

Players who ranked from 1 to 8, whose association could nominate 4 players.
Players who ranked from 9 to 24, whose association could nominate 3 players.
Players who ranked from 25 to 150, whose association could nominate 2 players.

Rank	Nation / Player	Points	Eligibility		Note
1	(China) Chen Qingchen (China) Jia Yifan	105,758	1	China (1)	BA highest ranked
2	(South Korea) Lee So-hee (South Korea) Shin Seung-chan	102,369	2	South Korea (1)	
3	(South Korea) Kim So-yeong (South Korea) Kong Hee-yong	101,982	3	South Korea (2)	
4	(Japan) Yuki Fukushima (Japan) Sayaka Hirota	101,608	4	Japan (1)	Host nation presenter
5	(Japan) Mayu Matsumoto (Japan) Wakana Nagahara	98,183	5	Japan (2)	
6	(Indonesia) Greysia Polii (Indonesia) Apriyani Rahayu	96,375		~~Indonesia~~	Greysia Polii has retired Decline participation
7	(Japan) Nami Matsuyama (Japan) Chiharu Shida	89,309	6	Japan (3)	
8	(Thailand) Jongkolphan Kititharakul (Thailand) Rawinda Prajongjai	77,979	7	Thailand (1)	
9	(Bulgaria) Gabriela Stoeva (Bulgaria) Stefani Stoeva	68,000	8	Bulgaria (1)	BE highest ranked
10	(South Korea) Chang Ye-na (South Korea) Kim Hye-rin	62,940		~~South Korea~~	Decline participation
11	(Malaysia) Chow Mei Kuan (Malaysia) Lee Meng Yean	60,944		~~Malaysia~~	Both players retired Decline participation
12	(England) Chloe Birch (England) Lauren Smith	60,944		~~England~~	Decline participation
13	(Malaysia) Pearly Tan (Malaysia) Thinaah Muralitharan	59,872	9	Malaysia (1)	
14	(China) Li Wenmei (China) Zheng Yu	59,872		~~China~~	Players unite with Du Yue and Zhang Shuxian respectively Decline participation
15	(South Korea) Baek Ha-na (South Korea) Jung Kyung-eun	59,110		~~South Korea~~	Decline participation
16	(Denmark) Maiken Fruergaard (Denmark) Sara Thygesen	56,333	10	Denmark (1)	
17	(Thailand) Puttita Supajirakul (Thailand) Sapsiree Taerattanachai	54,830	11	Thailand (2)	
18	(Netherlands) Selena Piek (Netherlands) Cheryl Seinen	52,824		~~Netherlands~~	Decline participation
19	(China) Liu Xuanxuan (China) Xia Yuting	51,266	12	China (2)	
20	(India) Ashwini Ponnappa (India) N. Sikki Reddy	50,306	13	India (1)	
21	(Canada) Rachel Honderich (Canada) Kristen Tsai	49,562	14	Canada (1)	BPA highest ranked
22	(Malaysia) Vivian Hoo (Malaysia) Yap Cheng Wen	48,502		~~Malaysia~~	Decline participation
23	(Japan) Rin Iwanaga (Japan) Kie Nakanishi	47,110	35	Japan (4)	Reserve 1
24	(Denmark) Amalie Magelund (Denmark) Freja Ravn	46,037		~~Denmark~~	Decline participation
25	(Germany) Linda Efler (Germany) Isabel Lohau	45,980	15	Germany (1)	
26	(Japan) Ayako Sakuramoto (Japan) Yukiko Takahata	45,304		~~Japan~~	Reserve 2 Decline participation
27	(Indonesia) Della Destiara Haris (Indonesia) Rizki Amelia Pradipta	44,963		~~Indonesia~~	Decline participation
28	(Indonesia) Siti Fadia Silva Ramadhanti (Indonesia) Ribka Sugiarto	44,618	16	Indonesia (1)	
29	(France) Émilie Lefel (France) Anne Tran	44,577		~~France~~	Decline participation
30	(Thailand) Benyapa Aimsaard (Thailand) Nuntakarn Aimsaard	44,450	36	Thailand (3)	Reserve 3
31	(Australia) Setyana Mapasa (Australia) Gronya Somerville	44,260		~~Australia~~	BO highest ranked Decline participation
32	(Denmark) Alexandra Bøje (Denmark) Mette Poulsen	43,474		~~Denmark~~	
33	(South Korea) Jeong Na-eun (South Korea) Kim Hye-jeong	43,320	37	South Korea (3)	Reserve 4
34	(Chinese Taipei) Hsu Ya-ching (Chinese Taipei) Hu Ling-fang	42,377		~~Chinese Taipei~~	Decline participation
35	(China) Dong Wenjing (China) Feng Xueying	40,380		~~China~~	Reserve 5 Decline participation
36	(India) Treesa Jolly (India) Gayatri Gopichand	39,530	17	India (2)	
37	(Russia) Ekaterina Malkova (Russia) Alina Davletova	38,353		~~Russia~~	Not eligible
38	(Malaysia) Vivian Hoo (Malaysia) Lim Chiew Sien	38,300	18	Malaysia (2)	
39	(Russia) Anastasiia Akchurina (Russia) Olga Morozova	38,209		~~Russia~~	Not eligible
40	(Japan) Chisato Hoshi (Japan) Aoi Matsuda	38,030		~~Japan~~	Reserve 6 Decline participation
41	(Indonesia) Nita Violina Marwah (Indonesia) Putri Syaikah	37,950		~~Indonesia~~	Reserve 7 Decline participation (on 5 August 2022)
42	(Scotland) Julie MacPherson (Scotland) Ciara Torrance	34,697	19	Scotland (1)	
43	(Thailand) Chayanit Chaladchalam (Thailand) Phataimas Muenwong	34,591		~~Thailand~~	Reserve 8 Decline participation
44	(France) Delphine Delrue (France) Léa Palermo	34,085		~~France~~	
45	(Netherlands) Debora Jille (Netherlands) Cheryl Seinen	33,883	20	Netherlands (1)	
46	(Sweden) Johanna Magnusson (Sweden) Clara Nistad	33,620	21	Sweden (1)	
47	(Egypt) Doha Hany (Egypt) Hadia Hosny	32,353		~~Egypt~~	BCA highest ranked Decline participation (on 7 August 2022)
48	(Netherlands) Alyssa Tirtosentono (Netherlands) Imke van der Aar	32,080		~~Netherlands~~	Decline participation
49	(Denmark) Julie Finne-Ipsen (Denmark) Mai Surrow	31,710		~~Denmark~~	Decline participation
50	(Denmark) Christine Busch (Denmark) Amalie Schulz	31,660		~~Denmark~~	Decline participation
51	(Turkey) Bengisu Erçetin (Turkey) Nazlıcan İnci	301,264		~~Turkey~~	Decline participation (on 15 June 2022)
52	(Estonia) Kati-Kreet Marran (Estonia) Helina Rüütel	30,850	22	Estonia (1)	
53	(Spain) Clara Azurmendi (Spain) Beatriz Corrales	30,486		~~Spain~~	Decline participation (on 4 July 2022)
54	(Canada) Catherine Choi (Canada) Josephine Wu	30,369	23	Canada (2)	
55	(Hong Kong) Ng Tsz Yau (Hong Kong) Yuen Sin Ying	29,518		~~Hong Kong~~	Decline participation
56	(Brazil) Jaqueline Lima (Brazil) Sâmia Lima	25,512	24	Brazil (1)	
57	(Sweden) Emma Karlsson (Sweden) Johanna Magnusson	29,320		~~Sweden~~	Emma Karlsson retired Decline participation
58	(India) Meghana Jakkampudi (India) Poorvisha S. Ram	29,260		~~India~~	Reserve 9 Decline participation
59	(Chinese Taipei) Chang Ching-hui (Chinese Taipei) Yang Ching-tun	29,224	25	Chinese Taipei (1)	
60	(Hong Kong) Ng Wing Yung (Hong Kong) Yeung Nga Ting	29,030		~~Hong Kong~~	Decline participation
61	(Chinese Taipei) Cheng Chi-ya (Chinese Taipei) Lee Chih-chen	29,030		~~Chinese Taipei~~	Reserve 10; Decline participation (on 27 July 2022)
62	(Thailand) Chasinee Korepap (Thailand) Jhenicha Sudjaipraparat	27,450		~~Thailand~~	Reserve 11; Decline participation
63	(France) Anne Tran (France) Margot Lambert	29,385	26	France (1)	Reserve 12
64	(India) Pooja Dandu (India) Sanjana Santosh	26,970	38	India (3)	Reserve 13
65	(Malaysia) Anna Cheong (Malaysia) Teoh Mei Xing	26,921	39	Malaysia (3)	Reserve 14
66	(India) Ashwini Bhat (India) Shikha Gautam	26,750	40	India (4)	Reserve 15
67	(France) Vimala Hériau (France) Margot Lambert	26,038		~~France~~	Decline participation
68	(Denmark) Natasja Anthonisen (Denmark) Clara Graversen	25,800		Denmark	Reserve 15
69	(England) Jenny Moore (England) Victoria Williams	25,601		~~England~~	Decline participation
70	(Japan) Shiho Tanaka (Japan) Koharu Yonemoto	25,540		~~Japan~~	Reserve 16; Decline participation
71	(Sweden) Clara Nistad (Sweden) Moa Sjöö	24,160		~~Sweden~~	Decline participation
72	(Ukraine) Mariia Stoliarenko (Ukraine) Yelyzaveta Zharka	24,130	27	Ukraine (1)	
73	(Indonesia) Yulfira Barkah (Indonesia) Jauza Fadhila Sugiarto	24,030		~~Indonesia~~	Reserve 17; Decline participation
74	(Peru) Daniela Macías (Peru) Dánica Nishimura	23691		~~Peru~~	Decline participation
75	(India) K. Maneesha (India) Rutaparna Panda	23,570		India	Reserve 18
76	(Switzerland) Aline Müller (Switzerland) Jenjira Stadelmann	23150		Switzerland	
77	(South Korea) Jung Kyung-eun (South Korea) Chang Ye-na	22,940		~~South Korea~~	Reserve 19; Decline participation
78	(Malaysia) Low Yeen Yuan (Malaysia) Valeree Siow	22,500	41	Malaysia (4)	Reserve 20
79	(Republic of Ireland) Kate Frost (Republic of Ireland) Moya Ryan	22,430	28	Ireland (1)	
80	(Germany) Annabella Jäger (Germany) Stine Küspert	22,320		~~Germany~~	Decline participation
81	(Malaysia) Anna Cheong (Malaysia) Lim Chiew Sien	22,230		Malaysia	Reserve 21
82	(India) Simran Singhi (India) Ritika Thaker	21,690		India	Reserve 22
83	(Guatemala) Diana Corleto (Guatemala) Nikté Sotomayor	21,633		~~Guatemala~~	Decline participation
84	(Germany) Emma Moszczynski (Germany) Stine Küspert	21,600	29	Germany (2)	
85	(Indonesia) Ni Ketut Mahadewi Istarani (Indonesia) Tania Oktaviani Kusumah	20,640		~~Indonesia~~	Reserve 23; Decline participation
86	(Indonesia) Anggia Shitta Awanda (Indonesia) Pia Zebadiah Bernadet	20,530		~~Indonesia~~	Reserve 24; Decline participation
87	(Malaysia) Teoh Mei Xing (Malaysia) Yap Ling	20,482		Malaysia	Reserve 25
88	(South Korea) Baek Ha-na (South Korea) Lee Yu-rim	20,340	42	South Korea (4)	Reserve 26
89	(Netherlands) Debora Jille (Netherlands) Alyssa Tirtosentono	20,222		~~Netherlands~~	Reserve 27; Decline participation
90	(England) Jessica Hopton (England) Jessica Pugh	20,120		~~England~~	Decline participation
91	(Japan) Sayaka Hobara (Japan) Natsuki Sone	20,020		~~Japan~~	Reserve 28; Decline participation
92	(Hong Kong) Yeung Nga Ting (Hong Kong) Yeung Pui Lam	19,678	30	Hong Kong (1)	
93	(Peru) Inés Castillo (Peru) Paula la Torre Regal	19,326	31	Peru (1)	
94	(Switzerland) Nadia Fankhauser (Netherlands) Iris Tabeling	19,320		~~Switzerland~~; ~~Netherlands~~	Reserve 29; Decline participation
95	(Italy) Martina Corsini (Italy) Judith Mair	18,950	32	Italy (1)	
96	(China) Zhang Shuxian (China) Zheng Yu	18,950	43	China (3)	Reserve 30
97	(Russia) Viktoriia Kozyreva (Russia) Mariia Sukhova	18,840		~~Russia~~	Not eligible
98	(Chinese Taipei) Kuo Yu-wen (Chinese Taipei) Lin Wan-ching	18,838		~~Chinese Taipei~~	Reserve 31; Decline participation (on 1 July 2022)
99	(Thailand) Ruethaichanok Laisuan (Thailand) Supamart Mingchua	18,820		Thailand	Reserve 32
100	(Italy) Katharina Fink (Italy) Yasmine Hamza	17,830		~~Italy~~	Decline participation (on 28 June 2022)
100+
103	(Austria) Serena Au Yeong (Austria) Katarina Hochmeir	17,170	33	Austria (1)	
105	(United States) Ariel Lee (United States) Sydney Lee	16,300		~~United States~~	Decline participation
106	(United States) Francesca Corbett (United States) Allison Lee	16,124	34	United States (1)	
111	(Maldives) Aminath Nabeeha Abdul Razzaq (Maldives) Fathimath Nabaaha Abdul Razzaq	15,500	44	Maldives (1)	Reserve 37
113	(China) Du Yue (China) Li Wenmei	15,350	45	China (4)	Reserve 39
114	(Indonesia) Febriana Dwipuji Kusuma (Indonesia) Amalia Cahaya Pratiwi	15,324	46	Indonesia (2)	Reserve 40
119	(Singapore) Jin Yujia (Singapore) Crystal Wong	14,860	47	Singapore (1)	Reserve 45
122	(France) Flavie Vallet (France) Emilie Vercelot	14,770	48	France (2)	Reserve 48
207	(Australia) Chen Hsuan-yu (Australia) Gronya Somerville	7,720		~~Australia~~	Oceania continental place Decline participation

=== Mixed doubles ===
According to the phase 2 updated by BWF, the following table is the invitation results.

Players who ranked from 1 to 8, whose association could nominate 4 players.
Players who ranked from 9 to 24, whose association could nominate 3 players.
Players who ranked from 25 to 150, whose association could nominate 2 players.

Rank	Nation / Player	Points	Eligibility		Note
1	(Thailand) Dechapol Puavaranukroh (Thailand) Sapsiree Taerattanachai	115,400	1	Thailand (1)	BA highest ranked
2	(China) Zheng Siwei (China) Huang Yaqiong	110,802	2	China (1)	
3	(Japan) Yuta Watanabe (Japan) Arisa Higashino	107,097	3	Japan (1)	Host nation presenter
4	(China) Wang Yilyu (China) Huang Dongping	105,817	4	China (2)	
5	(Indonesia) Praveen Jordan (Indonesia) Melati Daeva Oktavianti	93,949		~~Indonesia~~	Decline participation (on 29 June 2022)
6	(South Korea) Seo Seung-jae (South Korea) Chae Yoo-jung	80,720	5	South Korea (1)	
7	(Hong Kong) Tang Chun Man (Hong Kong) Tse Ying Suet	78,250	6	Hong Kong (1)	
8	(Malaysia) Chan Peng Soon (Malaysia) Goh Liu Ying	73,320		~~Malaysia~~	Decline participation
9	(Malaysia) Tan Kian Meng (Malaysia) Lai Pei Jing	72,340	7	Malaysia (1)	
10	(England) Marcus Ellis (England) Lauren Smith	71,747		~~England~~	BE highest ranked Decline participation (on 7 August 2022)
11	(France) Thom Gicquel (France) Delphine Delrue	67,332	8	France (1)	
12	(Indonesia) Hafiz Faizal (Indonesia) Gloria Emanuelle Widjaja	66,380		~~Indonesia~~	Decline participation
13	(Malaysia) Goh Soon Huat (Malaysia) Shevon Jemie Lai	66,282	9	Malaysia (2)	
14	(Denmark) Mathias Christiansen (Denmark) Alexandra Bøje	64,493	10	Denmark (1)	
15	(Germany) Mark Lamsfuß (Germany) Isabel Lohau	64,074	11	Germany (1)	
16	(Japan) Yuki Kaneko (Japan) Misaki Matsutomo	60,886	12	Japan (2)	
17	(South Korea) Ko Sung-hyun (South Korea) Eom Hye-won	59,990		~~South Korea~~	Decline participation
18	(England) Chris Adcock (England) Gabby Adcock	59,002		~~England~~	Both players retired Decline participation
19	(Russia) Rodion Alimov (Russia) Alina Davletova	56,273		~~Russia~~	Not eligible
20	(Indonesia) Rinov Rivaldy (Indonesia) Pitha Haningtyas Mentari	54,003	13	Indonesia (1)	
21	(Netherlands) Robin Tabeling (Netherlands) Selena Piek	53,309	14	Netherlands (1)	
22	(China) He Jiting (China) Du Yue	52,901		~~China~~	Decline participation
23	(Malaysia) Hoo Pang Ron (Malaysia) Cheah Yee See	52,203		~~Malaysia~~	Decline participation
24	(Thailand) Supak Jomkoh (Thailand) Supissara Paewsampran	49,250	15	Thailand (2)	
25	(Chinese Taipei) Lee Jhe-huei (Chinese Taipei) Hsu Ya-ching	47,693	16	Chinese Taipei (1)	
26	(India) Satwiksairaj Rankireddy (India) Ashwini Ponnappa	47,687		~~India~~	Decline participation
27	(Hong Kong) Chang Tak Ching (Hong Kong) Ng Wing Yung	46,130	17	Hong Kong (2)	
28	(Indonesia) Adnan Maulana (Indonesia) Mychelle Crhystine Bandaso	37,810		~~Indonesia~~	Reserve 1 Decline participation (on 5 August 2022)
29	(Denmark) Niclas Nøhr (Denmark) Amalie Magelund	44,372		~~Denmark~~	Decline participation
30	(Malaysia) Chen Tang Jie (Malaysia) Peck Yen Wei	43,747	37	Malaysia (3)	Reserve 2
31	(Thailand) Nipitphon Phuangphuapet (Thailand) Savitree Amitrapai	42,712		~~Thailand~~	Reserve 3 Decline participation
32	(Canada) Joshua Hurlburt-Yu (Canada) Josephine Wu	41,760		~~Canada~~	BPA highest ranked Decline participation
33	(Chinese Taipei) Wang Chi-lin (Chinese Taipei) Cheng Chi-ya	41,080		~~Chinese Taipei~~	Decline participation
34	(China) Lu Kai (China) Chen Lu	41,080		~~China~~	Reserve 4 Decline participation
35	(Japan) Takuro Hoki (Japan) Wakana Nagahara	40,982		~~Japan~~	Reserve 5 Decline participation
36	(Republic of Ireland) Sam Magee (Republic of Ireland) Chloe Magee	40,633		~~Ireland~~	Decline participation
37	(India) Pranaav Jerry Chopra (India) N. Sikki Reddy	38,551		~~India~~	Decline participation
38	(China) Guo Xinwa (China) Zhang Shuxian	38,050	38	China (3)	Reserve 6
39	(Chinese Taipei) Yang Po-hsuan (Chinese Taipei) Hu Ling-fang	37,385	18	Chinese Taipei (2)	
40	(England) Ben Lane (England) Jessica Pugh	37,440		~~England~~	Decline participation
41	(Denmark) Mikkel Mikkelsen (Denmark) Rikke Søby	37,120	19	Denmark (2)	
42	(Japan) Kyohei Yamashita (Japan) Naru Shinoya	37,000	39	Japan (3)	Reserve 7
43	(Scotland) Adam Hall (Scotland) Julie MacPherson	36,220	20	Scotland (1)	
44	(Indonesia) Rehan Naufal Kusharjanto (Indonesia) Lisa Ayu Kusumawati	35,800	40	Indonesia (2)	Reserve 8
45	(France) Ronan Labar (France) Anne Tran	34,919		~~France~~	Decline participation
46	(Denmark) Jeppe Bay (Denmark) Sara Lundgaard	34,200		Denmark	Reserve 9
47	(Chinese Taipei) Lee Yang (Chinese Taipei) Yang Ching-tun	33,900	41	Chinese Taipei (3)	Reserve 10
48	(Germany) Marvin Seidel (Germany) Linda Efler	33,543		~~Germany~~	Decline participation
49	(China) Ou Xuanyi (China) Feng Xueying	31,229		~~China~~	Reserve 11; Decline participation
50	(England) Callum Hemming (England) Jessica Pugh	32,400	21	England (1)	
51	(Germany) Jones Ralfy Jansen (Germany) Linda Efler	32,200	22	Germany (2)	
52	(Egypt) Adham Hatem Elgamal (Egypt) Doha Hany	32,175	23	Egypt (1)	BCA highest ranked
53	(Singapore) Terry Hee (Singapore) Tan Wei Han	31,620	24	Singapore (1)	
54	(China) Ren Xiangyu (China) Zhou Chaomin	31,070		~~China~~	Reserve 12; Decline participation
55	(Japan) Kohei Gondo (Japan) Ayane Kurihara	30,190		~~Japan~~	Reserve 13; Decline participation
56	(India) Ishaan Bhatnagar (India) Tanisha Crasto	30,160	25	India (1)	
57	(Denmark) Mathias Thyrri (Denmark) Mai Surrow	30,100		Denmark	Reserve 14
58	(India) Venkat Gaurav Prasad (India) Juhi Dewangan	30,070	26	India (2)	
59	(Russia) Evgenij Dremin (Russia) Evgeniya Dimova	28,988		~~Russia~~	Not eligible
60	(New Zealand) Oliver Leydon-Davis (New Zealand) Anona Pak	28,284		~~New Zealand~~	BO highest ranked Decline participation
61	(Brazil) Fabricio Farias (Brazil) Jaqueline Lima	27,720	27	Brazil (1)	
62	(Japan) Hiroki Midorikawa (Japan) Natsu Saito	27,220	42	Japan (4)	Reserve 15
63	(Germany) Jones Ralfy Jansen (Germany) Kilasu Ostermeyer	27,220		~~Germany~~	Reserve 16; Decline participation (on 1 July 2022)
64	(Denmark) Niclas Nøhr (Denmark) Sara Thygesen	26,990		Denmark	Reserve 17
65	(India) Arjun M. R. (India) K. Maneesha	26,420		~~India~~	Reserve 18; Decline participation (on 21 July 2022)
66	(Australia) Simon Leung (Australia) Gronya Somerville	26,220		~~Australia~~	Decline participation
67	(France) Éloi Adam (France) Margot Lambert	26,000		~~France~~	Decline participation
68	(England) Gregory Mairs (England) Victoria Williams	24,990		~~England~~	Reserve 19; Decline participation
69	(Hong Kong) Yeung Ming Nok (Hong Kong) Ng Tsz Yau	24,950		~~Hong Kong~~	Reserve 20; Decline participation
70	(Germany) Patrick Scheiel (Germany) Franziska Volkmann	24,940	43	Germany (3)	Reserve 21
71	(China) Dong Weijie (China) Chen Xiaofei	24,660		China	Reserve 22
72	(Singapore) Danny Bawa Chrisnanta (Singapore) Tan Wei Han	24,656		~~Singapore~~	Danny Bawa Chrisnanta has retired Decline participation
73	(France) William Villeger (France) Anne Tran	24,580	44	France (2)	Reserve 23
74	(Indonesia) Ricky Karandasuwardi (Indonesia) Pia Zebadiah Bernadet	24,560		~~Indonesia~~	Reserve 24; Decline participation (on 5 August 2022)
75	(Japan) Yujiro Nishikawa (Japan) Saori Ozaki	24,160		Japan	Reserve 25
76	(Denmark) Mathias Bay-Smidt (Denmark) Rikke Søby	23,770		Denmark	Reserve 26
77	(Chinese Taipei) Lu Ching-yao (Chinese Taipei) Lee Chia-hsin	23,620		Chinese Taipei	Reserve 27
78	(Guatemala) Jonathan Solís (Guatemala) Diana Corleto	23,450	28	Guatemala (1)	
79	(Denmark) Rasmus Espersen (Denmark) Christine Busch	23,250		Denmark	
80	(France) Fabien Delrue (France) Vimala Hériau	23,060	45	France (3)	Reserve 30
81	(France) William Villeger (France) Sharone Bauer	22,520		France	Reserve 31
82	(Indonesia) Zachariah Josiahno Sumanti (Indonesia) Hediana Julimarbela	22,230	46	Indonesia (3)	Reserve 32
83	(Netherlands) Ties van der Lecq (Netherlands) Debora Jille	21,967	29	Netherlands (2)	
84	(United States) Howard Shu (United States) Paula Lynn Cao Hok	21,580		~~United States~~	Decline participation
85	(Finland) Anton Kaisti (Czech Republic) Alžběta Bášová	21,550	30	Finland (1); Czech Republic (1)	
86	(Poland) Paweł Śmiłowski (Poland) Magdalena Świerczyńska	21,210		~~Poland~~	Decline participation
87	(South Korea) Choi Sol-gyu (South Korea) Shin Seung-chan	21,040	31	South Korea (2)	
88	(Indonesia) Dejan Ferdinansyah (Indonesia) Serena Kani	20,350		Indonesia	Reserve 33
89	(United States) Vinson Chiu (United States) Breanna Chi	20,160		~~United States~~	Decline participation
90	(Scotland) Christopher Grimley (Scotland) Eleanor O'Donnell	19,866		~~Scotland~~	
91	(Vietnam) Đỗ Tuấn Đức (Vietnam) Phạm Như Thảo	19,690		~~Vietnam~~	Decline participation
92	(Hong Kong) Mak Hee Chun (Hong Kong) Chau Hoi Wah	19,537		~~Hong Kong~~	Reserve 34; Chau Hoi Wah has retired Decline participation (on 8 August 2022)
93	(Belgium) Jona van Nieuwkerke (Belgium) Lise Jaques	19,290		~~Belgium~~	Decline participation
94	(Egypt) Ahmed Salah (Egypt) Hadia Hosny	18,866		~~Egypt~~ (2)	Decline participation (on 7 August 2022)
95	(Denmark) Jesper Toft (Denmark) Clara Graversen	18,490		Denmark	
96	(India) Dhruv Kapila (India) N. Sikki Reddy	18,380		~~India~~	Reserve 35; Decline participation (on 9 August 2022)
97	(India) Saurabh Sharma (India) Anouskha Parikh	18,320		~~India~~	Reserve 36; Decline participation (on 9 August 2022)
98	(United States) Vinson Chiu (United States) Jennie Gai	18,270	32	United States (1)	
99	(Mexico) Luis Montoya (Mexico) Vanessa Villalobos	18,040		~~Mexico~~	Decline participation
100	(Austria) Philip Birker (Austria) Katarina Hochmeir	17,890	33	Austria (1)	
100+
101	(South Korea) Kim Sa-rang (South Korea) Kim Ha-na	17,800		~~South Korea~~	Reserve 37; Decline participation (on 8 August 2022)
102	(Republic of Ireland) Paul Reynolds (Republic of Ireland) Rachael Darragh	17,700		~~Ireland~~	Decline participation
104	(United States) Mathew Fogarty (United States) Isabel Zhong	17,550	34	United States (2)	
105	(England) Gregory Mairs (England) Jenny Moore	17,330	47	England (2)	Reserve 38
106	(India) Dhruv Kapila (India) Meghana Jakkampudi	17,240		~~India~~	Reserve 39; Decline participation (on 9 August 2022)
107	(Malaysia) Man Wei Chong (Malaysia) Pearly Tan	17,160		~~Malaysia~~	Reserve 40; Decline participation (on 9 August 2022)
108	(India) Utkarsh Arora (India) Karishma Wadkar	16,940		~~India~~	Reserve 41; Decline participation (on 9 August 2022)
111	(Scotland) Alexander Dunn (Scotland) Ciara Torrance	16,220	35	Scotland (2)	
112	(Poland) Paweł Śmiłowski (Poland) Wiktoria Adamek	16,220		~~Poland~~	Decline participation (on 8 August 2022)
114	(Czech Republic) Jakub Bitman (Czech Republic) Alžběta Bášová	16,000		~~Czech Republic~~	Decline participation
118	(Israel) Misha Zilberman (Israel) Svetlana Zilberman	15,490	36	Israel (1)	
122	(Sri Lanka) Sachin Dias (Sri Lanka) Thilini Hendahewa	14,890	48	Sri Lanka (1)	Reserve 40
194	(Australia) Mitchell Wheller (Australia) Chen Hsuan-yu	8,760		~~Australia~~	Oceania continental place Decline participation
