= 1870s in Swedish football =

The 1870s in Swedish football, starting January 1870 and ending December 1879:

== Events ==
- Early 1870s: Various forms of football are introduced in Sweden. The development of football is centered around Gothenburg—which has an extensive trade and workforce exchange with England—and southern Sweden, mainly the cities of Malmö, Landskrona and Halmstad—which are influenced by the close by neighbour Denmark, one of the early football nations.
- 24 May or 28 May 1874: One of the earliest mentions of football in Sweden occurs this day when the Gothenburg newspaper Göteborgs-Posten publishes an article on a gymnastics society—without mentioning any name—that has been founded in the city, also telling that the society has played "a few football player games, which seemed to be of a very animated nature" on Heden, a public space in the centre of Gothenburg. No information on the type of football played, or the society's whereabouts during the next years, has been found.
- 1875: Göteborgs BK is founded, the first Swedish football club whose name is known. It is however most likely that the club used the Swedish football rules and not the association football rules. It is unknown for how long the club existed, but sources mention it as still active in the late 1880s. Göteborgs BK was probably one of the clubs that standardised the rules for Swedish football in 1885.
- 1879: Stockholms BK is founded as the first club from Stockholm playing the Swedish code. One source mentions the club playing a match on Gotland in 1878, but that seems unlikely as most sources gives 1879 as the year of foundation. A club with the same name regularly plays in the national league system during the 1920s, but it is unknown if that is the same club.
- 1879: Lars Mauritz Törngren, one of the most prominent Ling gymnastics ideologists, publishes the book Fria Lekar. Anvisning till skolans tjenst ("Athletic games. Instruction for the school service") in which he mentions football as "somewhat known in Sweden", but neglects to mention the sport further due to its perceived violent and brutal nature.
