= Carl Blidberg =

Swedish businessman and footballer (1867–1944)

Personal information
- Date of birth: 20 July 1867
- Place of birth: Gothenburg, Sweden
- Date of death: 3 December 1944 (aged 77)
- Place of death: Gothenburg, Sweden

Senior career*
Years	Team	Apps	(Gls)
1887	Göteborgs Gymnastiksällskap		
1888–1892	Lyckans Soldater		
- * Club domestic league appearances and goals

Carl Blidberg (20 July 1867 – 3 December 1944) was a Swedish businessman and footballer who played a crucial role in the amateur beginnings of football in Gothenburg, having been the fundamental head behind the foundation of Lyckans Soldater in 1883, and playing in one of the first-ever football matches in the city in 1887.

== Early and personal life ==
Carl Blidberg was born in Gothenburg on 20 July 1867, as the son of Nicoline Winberg and Fredrik Blidberg. In 1894, the 27-year-old Blidberg married Elin Bredberg, daughter of the merchant J. A. Bredberg and Marie Signeul.

== Playing career ==
On 12 October 1883, Blidberg was among the group of students from the Realgymnasium in Gothenburg who decided to create a sports club in the city, Lyckans Soldater ("Soldiers of Fortune"); Blidberg's family owned a farm called Lyckan, hence the club's name. On 4 September 1887, he played with Göteborgs Gymnastiksällskap ("Gothenburg Gymnastics Society") in a Swedish football match against Göteborgs BK at Heden, which was a mixture of the English football and rugby rules. For several years, Lyckans Soldater and Örgryte were the leading clubs in the city, and they went on to face each other in the first association football match played in Sweden in 1892, also at Heden.

In 1902, Blidberg served as the shopkeeper of the outdoor games society of Gothenburg, and in 1923, he was the chairman of the board of the Gothenburg Swimming Association.

== Business career ==
After completing his studies in 1886, Blidberg was employed at Andersson & Lenngren, where he worked for five years, until 1891, when he became a partner in the firm Setterberg & Blidberg, remaining there for six years, until 1897, when he became a partner and board member of AB Eneroth & Co. In 1905, he became the CEO of Trollhättans Oljeslageri AB, a position that he held for 11 years, until 1916, when the company marged with a few others to form the Svenska Oljeslageri AB, of which he was a director.

Blidberg served as the chairman of the boards of the Riksbank's branch office, Gothenburg Sparbank, Renströmska Badanstalten, and was also a board member of the Rescue Institute. For all his work, he became a Knight of the Order of Vasa. While he was the chairman of Riksbank, his brothers Figge and Nicke were a civil engineer and a clothing merchant, respectively.

== Death and legacy ==
Blidberg died in Gothenburg on 3 December 1944, at the age of 77. In March 2024, the Dohlstens brothers (Victor and John) made a musical drama performance about the history of Gothenburg football, with Blidberg, the initiator of Lyckans Soldater, being played by Victor.
