= 2018 Denmark Open =

2018 badminton tournament in Odense

Tournament details
- Dates: 16–21 October
- Level: Super 750
- Total prize money: US$775,000
- Venue: Odense Sports Park
- Location: Odense, Denmark

Champions
- Men's singles: (Japan) Kento Momota
- Women's singles: (Chinese Taipei) Tai Tzu-ying
- Men's doubles: (Indonesia) Marcus Fernaldi Gideon (Indonesia) Kevin Sanjaya Sukamuljo
- Women's doubles: (Japan) Yuki Fukushima (Japan) Sayaka Hirota
- Mixed doubles: (China) Zheng Siwei (China) Huang Yaqiong

The 2018 Denmark Open (officially known as the Danisa Denmark Open presented by Victor 2018 for sponsorship reasons) was a badminton tournament which took place at Odense Sports Park in Odense, Denmark, from 16 to 21 October 2018 and had a total prize of $775,000.

== Tournament ==
The 2018 Denmark Open was the twentieth tournament of the 2018 BWF World Tour and also part of the Denmark Open championships, which had been held since 1935. This tournament was organized by Badminton Denmark and sanctioned by the BWF.

=== Venue ===
This international tournament was held at Odense Sports Park in Odense, Denmark.

=== Point distribution ===
Below is the point distribution table for each phase of the tournament based on the BWF points system for the BWF World Tour Super 750 event.

Winner	Runner-up	3/4	5/8	9/16	17/32
11,000	9,350	7,700	6,050	4,320	2,660

=== Prize money ===
The total prize money for the tournament was US$775,000. Distribution of prize money was in accordance with BWF regulations.

Event	Winner	Finals	Semi-finals	Quarter-finals	Last 16	Last 32
Singles	$54,250	$26,350	$10,850	$4,262.50	$2,325	$775
Doubles	$57,350	$27,125	$10,850	$4,843.75	$2,518.75	$775

== Men's singles ==
=== Seeds ===
1. (Denmark) Viktor Axelsen (second round)
2. (Japan) Kento Momota (champion)
3. (China) Shi Yuqi (first round)
4. (Chinese Taipei) Chou Tien-chen (final)
5. (China) Chen Long (first round)
6. (South Korea) Son Wan-ho (quarter-finals)
7. (India) Srikanth Kidambi (semi-finals)
8. (Japan) Kenta Nishimoto (second round)

=== Finals ===
Semi-finals
(Denmark) Anders Antonsen	21	11	12
4	(Chinese Taipei) Chou Tien-chen	19	21	21
7	(India) Srikanth Kidambi	16	12
2	(Japan) Kento Momota	21	21

Final
4	(Chinese Taipei) Chou Tien-chen	20	21	15
2	(Japan) Kento Momota	22	16	21

=== Top half ===
==== Section 1 ====
First Round
1	(Denmark) V Axelsen	21	21
(Japan) K Sakai	12	19
(Denmark) A Antonsen	21	21
(Netherlands) M Caljouw	18	18
8	(Japan) K Nishimoto	19	21	21
(Denmark) R Gemke	21	16	17
(China) Huang YX	12	21	21
(India) B. S Praneeth	21	14	15

Second Round
1	(Denmark) V Axelsen	10	21	19
(Denmark) A Antonsen	21	12	21
8	(Japan) K Nishimoto	20	12
(China) Huang YX	22	21

Quarter-finals
(Denmark) A Antonsen	21	13	22
(China) Huang YX	14	21	20

==== Section 2 ====
First Round
4	(Chinese Taipei) Chou T-c	18	21	21
(South Korea) Lee D-k	21	12	15
(Japan) K Tsuneyama	21	12	22
(Malaysia) Liew D	15	21	20
6	(South Korea) Son W-h	21	21
PMD	(Chinese Taipei) Hsu J-h	13	15
(England) R Ouseph	12	19
(Indonesia) T Sugiarto	21	21

Second Round
4	(Chinese Taipei) Chou T-c	21	21
(Japan) K Tsuneyama	18	16
6	(South Korea) Son W-h	13	21	21
(Indonesia) T Sugiarto	21	16	9

Quarter-finals
4	(Chinese Taipei) Chou T-c	17	21	21
6	(South Korea) Son W-h	21	19	15

=== Bottom half ===
==== Section 3 ====
First Round
(Thailand) K Wangcharoen	13	21	7
(China) Lin D	21	14	21
(Denmark) H-K Vittinghus	16	10
7	(India) S Kidambi	21	21
(Indonesia) J Christie	17	21	21
(Hong Kong) Wong W K	21	18	13
(India) S Verma	21	21
3	(China) Shi YQ	17	18

Second Round
(China) Lin D	21	17	16
7	(India) S Kidambi	18	21	21
(Indonesia) J Christie	21	21	20
(India) S Verma	23	6	22

Quarter-finals
7	(India) S Kidambi	22	19	23
(India) S Verma	20	21	21

==== Section 4 ====
First Round
(Thailand) K Phetpradab	21	21
(France) B Leverdez	15	14
(Hong Kong) Ng K L	22	21
5	(China) Chen L	20	15
(Thailand) S Avihingsanon	w	/	o
(Chinese Taipei) Wang T-w
(Indonesia) A S Ginting	18	23	15
2	(Japan) K Momota	21	21	21

Second Round
(Thailand) K Phetpradab	21	21
(Hong Kong) Ng K L	12	19
(Thailand) S Avihingsanon	14	13
2	(Japan) K Momota	21	21

Quarter-finals
(Thailand) K Phetpradab	13	9
2	(Japan) K Momota	21	21

== Women's singles ==
=== Seeds ===
1. (Chinese Taipei) Tai Tzu-ying (champion)
2. (Japan) Akane Yamaguchi (second round)
3. (India) P. V. Sindhu (first round)
4. (Thailand) Ratchanok Intanon (second round)
5. (Spain) Carolina Marín (first round)
6. (China) Chen Yufei (quarter-finals)
7. (China) He Bingjiao (semi-finals)
8. (Japan) Nozomi Okuhara (quarter-finals)

=== Finals ===
Semi-finals
1	(Chinese Taipei) Tai Tzu-ying	21	21
7	(China) He Bingjiao	14	12
(Indonesia) Gregoria Mariska Tunjung	11	12
(India) Saina Nehwal	21	21

Final
1	(Chinese Taipei) Tai Tzu-ying	21	13	21
(India) Saina Nehwal	13	21	6

=== Top half ===
==== Section 1 ====
First Round
1	(Chinese Taipei) Tai T-y	21	21
(Japan) S Takahashi	14	15
(China) Gao FJ	17	16
(Thailand) B Ongbamrungphan	21	21
6	(China) Chen YF	21	21
(Japan) S Sato	17	19
(Canada) M Li	21	22
(Russia) E Kosetskaya	13	20

Second Round
1	(Chinese Taipei) Tai T-y	21	21
(Thailand) B Ongbamrungphan	16	15
6	(China) Chen YF	21	21
(Canada) M Li	19	18

Quarter-finals
1	(Chinese Taipei) Tai T-y	21	12	21
6	(China) Chen YF	13	21	9

==== Section 2 ====
First Round
4	(Thailand) R Intanon	21	21
(Scotland) K Gilmour	10	17
(China) Cai YY	21	21
(Bulgaria) L Zetchiri	2	8
7	(China) He BJ	16	21	21
(Thailand) P Chochuwong	21	17	14
(Chinese Taipei) Lee C-h	11	13
(South Korea) Sung J-h	21	21

Second Round
4	(Thailand) R Intanon	20	20
(China) Cai YY	22	22
7	(China) He BJ	22	21
(South Korea) Sung J-h	20	10

Quarter-finals
(China) Cai YY	13	16
7	(China) He BJ	21	21

=== Bottom half ===
==== Section 3 ====
First Round
(Indonesia) G M Tunjung	21	24
(China) Chen XX	9	22
(Denmark) M Blichfeldt	21	14	21
5	(Spain) C Marín	19	21	19
(Denmark) L Kjærsfeldt	21	23
(Japan) A Ohori	18	21
(United States) Zhang BW	21	16	21
3	(India) P. V. Sindhu	17	21	18

Second Round
(Indonesia) G M Tunjung	16	21	21
(Denmark) M Blichfeldt	21	16	11
(Denmark) L Kjærsfeldt	21	21
(United States) Zhang BW	18	12

Quarter-finals
(Indonesia) G M Tunjung	20	21	21
(Denmark) L Kjærsfeldt	22	19	13

==== Section 4 ====
First Round
PFR	(Canada) R Honderich	16	8
(Japan) S Kawakami	21	21
(Thailand) N Jindapol	19	18
8	(Japan) N Okuhara	21	21
(India) S Nehwal	20	21	24
(Hong Kong) Cheung N Y	22	17	22
(Spain) B Corrales	21	15	16
2	(Japan) A Yamaguchi	18	21	21

Second Round
(Japan) S Kawakami	15	14
8	(Japan) N Okuhara	21	21
(India) S Nehwal	21	21
2	(Japan) A Yamaguchi	15	17

Quarter-finals
8	(Japan) N Okuhara	21	16	12
(India) S Nehwal	17	21	21

== Men's doubles ==
=== Seeds ===
1. (Indonesia) Marcus Fernaldi Gideon / Kevin Sanjaya Sukamuljo (champions)
2. (China) Li Junhui / Liu Yuchen (second round)
3. (China) Liu Cheng / Zhang Nan (second round)
4. (Japan) Takeshi Kamura / Keigo Sonoda (final)
5. (Denmark) Mathias Boe / Carsten Mogensen (second round)
6. (Denmark) Mads Conrad-Petersen / Mads Pieler Kolding (first round)
7. (Indonesia) Fajar Alfian / Muhammad Rian Ardianto (withdrew)
8. (Japan) Takuto Inoue / Yuki Kaneko (quarter-finals)

=== Finals ===
Semi-finals
1	(Indonesia) Marcus Fernaldi Gideon (Indonesia) Kevin Sanjaya Sukamuljo	21	24
(Indonesia) Mohammad Ahsan (Indonesia) Hendra Setiawan	18	22
4	(Japan) Takeshi Kamura (Japan) Keigo Sonoda	21	21
(England) Marcus Ellis (England) Chris Langridge	17	19

Final
1	(Indonesia) Marcus Fernaldi Gideon (Indonesia) Kevin Sanjaya Sukamuljo	21	21
4	(Japan) Takeshi Kamura (Japan) Keigo Sonoda	15	16

=== Top half ===
==== Section 1 ====
First Round
1	(Indonesia) M F Gideon (Indonesia) K S Sukamuljo	21	22
(China) He JT (China) Tan Q	19	20
(Germany) M Lamsfuß (Germany) M E Seidel	21	29
(South Korea) Kang M-h (South Korea) Kim W-h	19	27
6	(Denmark) M Conrad-Petersen (Denmark) M P Kolding	21	19	15
(Indonesia) B Angriawan (Indonesia) Hardianto	13	21	21
(Japan) T Hoki (Japan) Y Kobayashi	21	11	21
(Malaysia) Ong Y S (Malaysia) Teo E Y	19	21	16

Second Round
1	(Indonesia) M F Gideon (Indonesia) K S Sukamuljo	21	21
(Germany) M Lamsfuß (Germany) M E Seidel	17	14
(Indonesia) B Angriawan (Indonesia) Hardianto	12	18
(Japan) T Hoki (Japan) Y Kobayashi	21	21

Quarter-finals
1	(Indonesia) M F Gideon (Indonesia) K S Sukamuljo	21	21
(Japan) T Hoki (Japan) Y Kobayashi	17	15

==== Section 2 ====
First Round
3	(China) Liu C (China) Zhang N	21	21
(Japan) H Endo (Japan) Y Watanabe	19	14
(China) Han CK (China) Zhou HD	17	21	25
(Chinese Taipei) Lu C-y (Chinese Taipei) Yang P-h	21	19	23
5	(Denmark) M Boe (Denmark) C Mogensen	21	21
(Netherlands) J Maas (Netherlands) R Tabeling	19	15
(Chinese Taipei) Lee J-h (Chinese Taipei) Lee Y	18	21	13
(Indonesia) M Ahsan (Indonesia) H Setiawan	21	19	21

Second Round
3	(China) Liu C (China) Zhang N	21	20	18
(China) Han CK (China) Zhou HD	16	22	21
5	(Denmark) M Boe (Denmark) C Mogensen	12	22
(Indonesia) M Ahsan (Indonesia) H Setiawan	21	24

Quarter-finals
(China) Han CK (China) Zhou HD	19	23
(Indonesia) M Ahsan (Indonesia) H Setiawan	21	25

=== Bottom half ===
==== Section 3 ====
First Round
(Germany) J R Jansen (Germany) J Zurwonne	23	21	12
(Denmark) K Antonsen (Denmark) N Nøhr	21	23	21
PFR	(Netherlands) J Arends (Netherlands) R Jille	17	19
8	(Japan) T Inoue (Japan) Y Kaneko	21	21
(Thailand) B Isara (Thailand) M Jongjit	16	13
(Chinese Taipei) Chen H-l (Chinese Taipei) Wang C-l	21	21
(Russia) V Ivanov (Russia) I Sozonov	25	10
4	(Japan) T Kamura (Japan) K Sonoda	27	21

Second Round
(Denmark) K Antonsen (Denmark) N Nøhr	11	10
8	(Japan) T Inoue (Japan) Y Kaneko	21	21
(Chinese Taipei) Chen H-l (Chinese Taipei) Wang C-l	16	16
4	(Japan) T Kamura (Japan) K Sonoda	21	21

Quarter-finals
8	(Japan) T Inoue (Japan) Y Kaneko	19	25
4	(Japan) T Kamura (Japan) K Sonoda	21	27

==== Section 4 ====
First Round
(Denmark) K Astrup (Denmark) A S Rasmussen	25	18	21
(India) M Attri (India) B. S Reddy	23	21	16
(Chinese Taipei) Liao M-c (Chinese Taipei) Su C-h	17	22	21
PMD	(England) B Lane (England) S Vendy	21	20	13
(South Korea) Chung E-s (South Korea) Kim D-y	21	17	20
(England) M Ellis (England) C Langridge	14	21	22
(Indonesia) W Nayaka (Indonesia) A Yusuf	11	17
2	(China) Li JH (China) Liu YC	21	21

Second Round
(Denmark) K Astrup (Denmark) A S Rasmussen	16	18
(Chinese Taipei) Liao M-c (Chinese Taipei) Su C-h	21	21
(England) M Ellis (England) C Langridge	21	21
2	(China) Li JH (China) Liu YC	16	16

Quarter-finals
(Chinese Taipei) Liao M-c (Chinese Taipei) Su C-h	21	16	20
(England) M Ellis (England) C Langridge	16	21	22

== Women's doubles ==
=== Seeds ===
1. (Japan) Yuki Fukushima / Sayaka Hirota (champions)
2. (China) Chen Qingchen / Jia Yifan (second round)
3. (Indonesia) Greysia Polii / Apriyani Rahayu (semi-finals)
4. (Japan) Misaki Matsutomo / Ayaka Takahashi (second round)
5. (Japan) Shiho Tanaka / Koharu Yonemoto (final)
6. (Japan) Mayu Matsumoto / Wakana Nagahara (first round)
7. (South Korea) Lee So-hee / Shin Seung-chan (second round)
8. (Thailand) Jongkolphan Kititharakul / Rawinda Prajongjai (quarter-finals)

=== Finals ===
Semi-finals
1	(Japan) Yuki Fukushima (Japan) Sayaka Hirota	21	21
3	(Indonesia) Greysia Polii (Indonesia) Apriyani Rahayu	13	16
(South Korea) Kim Hye-jeong (South Korea) Kong Hee-yong	12	14
5	(Japan) Shiho Tanaka (Japan) Koharu Yonemoto	21	21

Final
1	(Japan) Yuki Fukushima (Japan) Sayaka Hirota	21	21
5	(Japan) Shiho Tanaka (Japan) Koharu Yonemoto	19	16

=== Top half ===
==== Section 1 ====
First Round
1	(Japan) Y Fukushima (Japan) S Hirota	21	21
(England) C Birch (England) L Smith	10	10
(Chinese Taipei) Hsu Y-c (Chinese Taipei) Wu T-j	9	21	15
(Denmark) M Fruergaard (Denmark) S Thygesen	21	19	21
7	(South Korea) Lee S-h (South Korea) Shin S-c	21	22
(Bulgaria) G Stoeva (Bulgaria) S Stoeva	9	20
(India) A Ponnappa (India) N. S Reddy	21	21
(United States) A Lee (United States) S Lee	7	11

Second Round
1	(Japan) Y Fukushima (Japan) S Hirota	21	21
(Denmark) M Fruergaard (Denmark) S Thygesen	9	14
7	(South Korea) Lee S-h (South Korea) Shin S-c	21	20	18
(India) A Ponnappa (India) N. S Reddy	18	22	21

Quarter-finals
1	(Japan) Y Fukushima (Japan) S Hirota	21	21
(India) A Ponnappa (India) N. S Reddy	14	12

==== Section 2 ====
First Round
3	(Indonesia) G Polii (Indonesia) A Rahayu	21	21
PFR	(Germany) L Efler (Germany) I Herttrich	13	12
(India) M Jakkampudi (India) P S. Ram	17	11
(Sweden) E Karlsson (Sweden) J Magnusson	21	21
6	(Japan) M Matsumoto (Japan) W Nagahara	19	18
(Netherlands) S Piek (Netherlands) C Seinen	21	21
(Indonesia) N K M Istarani (Indonesia) R A Pradipta	21	21
(Malaysia) Chow M K (Malaysia) Lee M Y	13	11

Second Round
3	(Indonesia) G Polii (Indonesia) A Rahayu	21	21
(Sweden) E Karlsson (Sweden) J Magnusson	6	17
(Netherlands) S Piek (Netherlands) C Seinen	14	19
(Indonesia) N K M Istarani (Indonesia) R A Pradipta	21	21

Quarter-finals
3	(Indonesia) G Polii (Indonesia) A Rahayu	18	21	21
(Indonesia) N K M Istarani (Indonesia) R A Pradipta	21	18	19

=== Bottom half ===
==== Section 3 ====
First Round
(Canada) R Honderich (Canada) K Tsai	17	9
(China) Li WM (China) Zheng Y	21	21
(China) Tang JH (China) Yu XH
8	(Thailand) J Kititharakul (Thailand) R Prajongjai	w	/	o
(Russia) E Bolotova (Russia) A Davletova	7	12
(South Korea) Kim H-j (South Korea) Kong H-y	21	21
(France) D Delrue (France) L Palermo	14	14
4	(Japan) M Matsutomo (Japan) A Takahashi	21	21

Second Round
(China) Li WM (China) Zheng Y	21	15	18
8	(Thailand) J Kititharakul (Thailand) R Prajongjai	19	21	21
(South Korea) Kim H-j (South Korea) Kong H-y	21	21
4	(Japan) M Matsutomo (Japan) A Takahashi	18	14

Quarter-finals
8	(Thailand) J Kititharakul (Thailand) R Prajongjai	17	9
(South Korea) Kim H-j (South Korea) Kong H-y	21	21

==== Section 4 ====
First Round
(France) É Lefel (France) A Tran	14	15
(Japan) N Fukuman (Japan) K Yonao	21	21
PFR	(Denmark) A Magelund (Denmark) F Ravn	17	13
5	(Japan) S Tanaka (Japan) K Yonemoto	21	21
(Germany) J Goliszewski (Germany) L Käpplein	12	12
(China) Du Y (China) Li YH	21	21
(South Korea) Chang Y-n (South Korea) Jung K-e	20	21	16
2	(China) Chen QC (China) Jia YF	22	16	21

Second Round
(Japan) N Fukuman (Japan) K Yonao	18	15
5	(Japan) S Tanaka (Japan) K Yonemoto	21	21
(China) Du Y (China) Li YH	21	21
2	(China) Chen QC (China) Jia YF	17	13

Quarter-finals
5	(Japan) S Tanaka (Japan) K Yonemoto	19	21	21
(China) Du Y (China) Li YH	21	17	9

== Mixed doubles ==
=== Seeds ===
1. (China) Zheng Siwei / Huang Yaqiong (champions)
2. (China) Wang Yilü / Huang Dongping (second round)
3. (Indonesia) Tontowi Ahmad / Liliyana Natsir (semi-finals)
4. (Hong Kong) Tang Chun Man / Tse Ying Suet (second round)
5. (Denmark) Mathias Christiansen / Christinna Pedersen (quarter-finals)
6. (Malaysia) Chan Peng Soon / Goh Liu Ying (quarter-finals)
7. (Malaysia) Goh Soon Huat / Shevon Jemie Lai (quarter-finals)
8. (England) Chris Adcock / Gabrielle Adcock (quarter-finals)

=== Finals ===
Semi-finals
1	(China) Zheng Siwei (China) Huang Yaqiong	21	19	21
3	(Indonesia) Tontowi Ahmad (Indonesia) Liliyana Natsir	11	21	17
(South Korea) Seo Seung-jae (South Korea) Chae Yoo-jung	16	21	16
(Thailand) Dechapol Puavaranukroh (Thailand) Sapsiree Taerattanachai	21	17	21

Final
1	(China) Zheng Siwei (China) Huang Yaqiong	21	21
(Thailand) Dechapol Puavaranukroh (Thailand) Sapsiree Taerattanachai	16	13

=== Top half ===
==== Section 1 ====
First Round
1	(China) Zheng SW (China) Huang YQ	21	21
(Indonesia) P Jordan (Indonesia) M D Oktavianti	14	7
(China) Zhang N (China) Li YH	15	15
(Indonesia) R Karanda Suwardi (Indonesia) D Susanto	21	21
8	(England) C Adcock (England) G Adcock	21	21
(Denmark) N Nøhr (Denmark) S Thygesen	12	19
(Indonesia) H Faizal (Indonesia) G E Widjaja	21	21
(France) R Labar (France) A Fontaine	11	11

Second Round
1	(China) Zheng SW (China) Huang YQ	21	21
(Indonesia) R Karanda Suwardi (Indonesia) D Susanto	18	11
8	(England) C Adcock (England) G Adcock	21	21
(Indonesia) H Faizal (Indonesia) G E Widjaja	12	18

Quarter-finals
1	(China) Zheng SW (China) Huang YQ	21	21
8	(England) C Adcock (England) G Adcock	12	7

==== Section 2 ====
First Round
3	(Indonesia) T Ahmad (Indonesia) L Natsir	21	21
(England) B Lane (England) J Pugh	11	16
(Germany) M Lamsfuß (Germany) I Herttrich	21	21
(Chinese Taipei) Lee Y (Chinese Taipei) Hsu Y-c	13	17
5	(Denmark) M Christiansen (Denmark) C Pedersen	21	21
(Chinese Taipei) Wang C-l (Chinese Taipei) Lee C-h	19	17
(Germany) M E Seidel (Germany) L Efler	21	21
PFR	(Republic of Ireland) S Magee (Republic of Ireland) C Magee	12	15

Second Round
3	(Indonesia) T Ahmad (Indonesia) L Natsir	21	13	21
(Germany) M Lamsfuß (Germany) I Herttrich	14	21	19
5	(Denmark) M Christiansen (Denmark) C Pedersen	21	21
(Germany) M E Seidel (Germany) L Efler	15	10

Quarter-finals
3	(Indonesia) T Ahmad (Indonesia) L Natsir	26	21
5	(Denmark) M Christiansen (Denmark) C Pedersen	24	10

=== Bottom half ===
==== Section 3 ====
First Round
(Japan) Y Watanabe (Japan) A Higashino	21	17	23
(China) He JT (China) Du Y	17	21	21
(Netherlands) J Arends (Netherlands) S Piek	21	19	16
6	(Malaysia) Chan P S (Malaysia) Goh L Y	18	21	21
(South Korea) Seo S-j (South Korea) Chae Y-j	21	21
(India) S Rankireddy (India) A Ponnappa	17	18
(Netherlands) R Tabeling (Netherlands) C Seinen	14	14
4	(Hong Kong) Tang C M (Hong Kong) Tse Y S	21	21

Second Round
(Japan) Y Watanabe (Japan) A Higashino	18	16
6	(Malaysia) Chan P S (Malaysia) Goh L Y	21	21
(South Korea) Seo S-j (South Korea) Chae Y-j	21	17	22
4	(Hong Kong) Tang C M (Hong Kong) Tse Y S	12	21	20

Quarter-finals
6	(Malaysia) Chan P S (Malaysia) Goh L Y	14	21	12
(South Korea) Seo S-j (South Korea) Chae Y-j	21	17	21

==== Section 4 ====
First Round
(Japan) T Hoki (Japan) W Nagahara	21	19	16
(China) Lu K (China) Chen L	16	21	21
(Denmark) M Mikkelsen (Denmark) M Surrow	19	21	11
7	(Malaysia) Goh S H (Malaysia) S J Lai	21	19	21
(Thailand) D Puavaranukroh (Thailand) S Taerattanachai	21	22	22
(Hong Kong) Lee C H (Hong Kong) Chau H W	16	24	20
(England) M Ellis (England) L Smith	5	18
2	(China) Wang YL (China) Huang DP	21	21

Second Round
(China) Lu K (China) Chen L	16	7
7	(Malaysia) Goh S H (Malaysia) S J Lai	21	21
(Thailand) D Puavaranukroh (Thailand) S Taerattanachai	21	21
2	(China) Wang YL (China) Huang DP	14	15

Quarter-finals
7	(Malaysia) Goh S H (Malaysia) S J Lai	14	11
(Thailand) D Puavaranukroh (Thailand) S Taerattanachai	21	21

Preceded by 2018 Dutch Open	BWF World Tour; 2018 BWF season	Succeeded by 2018 French Open
