= Blidberg =

Blidberg is a Swedish surname. Notable people with the surname include:

- Johan Wilhelm Stjernschantz (né Blidberg) (1825–1886), Finnish soldier and civil servant
- Carl Blidberg (1867–1944), a Swedish businessman and footballer
- Einar Blidberg (1906–1993), a Swedish Navy officer
- Agneta Blidberg (born 1944), a Swedish prosecutor
- Allan Blidberg, co-founder of the Blidberg Rothchild Company
