= Swedish football (code) =

Variation of football

Swedish football (Swedish: Svensk fotboll) was a code of football devised and played in Sweden from the 1870s to the early 1890s, when the modern association football was introduced. Swedish football rules were a mix of the association football rules and the rugby football rules, most closely resembling the former.

== History ==
The inspiration for Swedish football came from the English football, however, when ball games first were introduced in Sweden in the 1870s, the distinct rules of the different codes of football that had been adopted around ten years earlier in England were lost on the way over to Sweden, and no distinction was made between the codes. This caused confusion as some played the game with the round ball, while others played with the oval ball. One of the first mentions of football being played was in an article in Göteborgs-Posten on 24 May 1874, where the readers were told that a gymnastics society had been founded in Gothenburg, and that the society also had played "a few football player games, which seemed to be of a very animated nature". A year later, Göteborgs Bollklubb were founded, and the club had amongst other sports football on the programme.

In 1880, the first set of rules for Swedish football were published in the book Fria Lekar. Anvisning till skolans tjenst by Lars Mauritz Törngren. He had visited England to study sports and returned to write down his experiences in the book. He had misunderstood—or completely failed to notice—the codification of football made almost 20 years earlier, and his set of rules were thus a mix of association and rugby football, "a middle course", as he expressed it. The rules were hard to understand and did not come into widespread use. Instead, five years later in 1885, Göteborgs BK along with the leading clubs in Stockholm (Stockholms Bollklubb founded 1879) and Visby (Visby Bollklubb) met and established a set of rules that were to dominate the Swedish football scene in the following years.

The first association football match played on Swedish soil took place in Malmö on 12 October 1890 when Kjøbenhavns Boldklub visited the city and two of the teams of the Danish club played an exhibition match. But it was in Gothenburg that the modern football had its breakthrough, and the first national match was played 22 May 1892 between the two Gothenburg clubs Örgryte Idrottssällskap and Idrottssällskapet Lyckans Soldater. By 1895, association football had outrivaled the Swedish variant, with much help by the English, Scottish and Australian immigrant workers that introduced the modern code at their workplaces.

== Rules ==
The rules of Swedish football were much like the association rules, with two main exceptions, the players were allowed to catch the ball with their hands and run with it a short time before drop kicking it away again, and the goal did not have any crossbar. The number of rules written down by Lars Mauritz Törngren were ten:

1. A goal is made by an honest full kick or drop kick of the ball from the hand; [To not be surprised, a keeper is positioned at the goal. He can, after order by the captain, be changed during the game.] or an honest bulley which brings the ball through all obstacles between the goal posts. Sometimes a certain height is prescribed which the ball must pass over.
2. The area or the field for the play shall be marked by sidelines. When the ball is kicked outside these boundaries, any competitor may kick him back perpendicular into the field at the point where he passed out from the field.
3. A player who is behind the ball, i.e. closer to the home of the opposite team than his teammate at the moment he kicked the ball, is out of play and may not participate except in agreement with the following rule
4. A player who, according to the preceding rule, is out of play is not allowed to kick the ball or hinder anyone from doing this until the ball has been touched by someone of the opposite team, after which he is allowed participate like before.
5. A player who has honestly got hold of the ball, either through a catch or after the first bounce, may run with the same a short part with the intention to gain an opportunity for a drop kick or a punt.
6. Every player of the opposite team may use lawful ways to hinder him who has the ball, to drop kick or make a full punt.
7. To take or hold someone is under no conditions allowed during any part of the game.
8. Hitting, kicking and tripping is not allowed.
9. At the start of the game the captains of both sides shall between themselves agree how long the game shall be played.
10. At the agreed time, independent of what phase the game is in, one of the captains shall yell "finished game", and the play shall immediately be stopped.

== See also ==
- Football in Sweden
- Rugby union in Sweden
- History of football (soccer)
- Laws of the Game (association football)
