= First football match in Sweden =

1892 football match in Gothenburg, Sweden

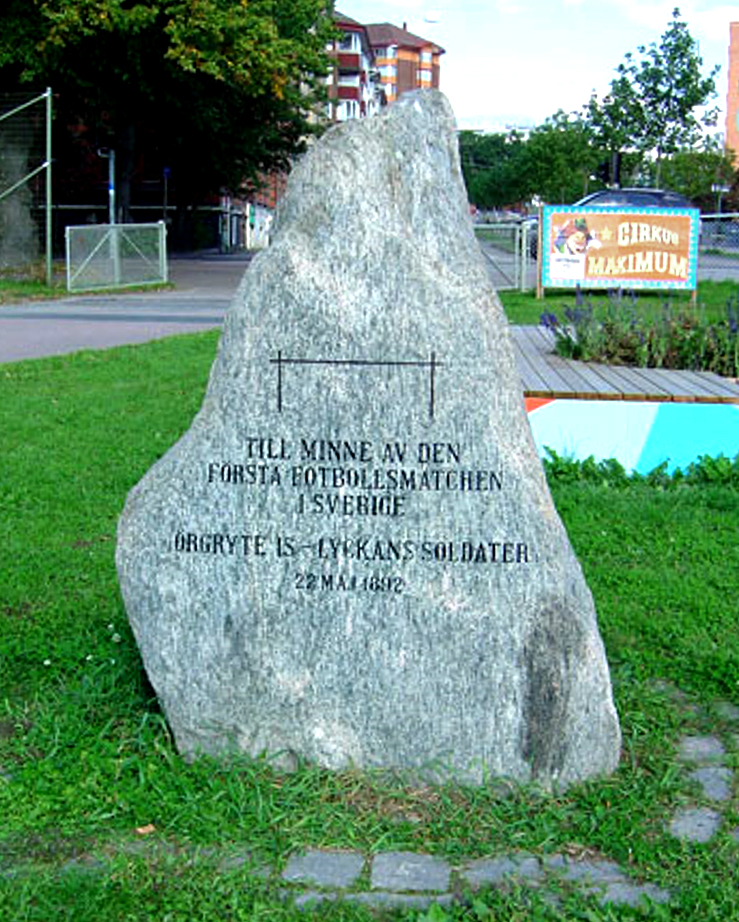
Memorial stone at Heden.

The first football match in Sweden was played at Heden, Gothenburg 22 May 1892 between Örgryte IS and Idrottssällskapet Lyckans Soldater. Örgryte IS won the game. The final score was 1-0.

To commemorate this event there is a stone at Heden with the inscription:

In memory of the first football game in Sweden Örgryte IS-Lyckans soldater 22 May 1892
