= IS Lyckans Soldater =

Swedish sports club

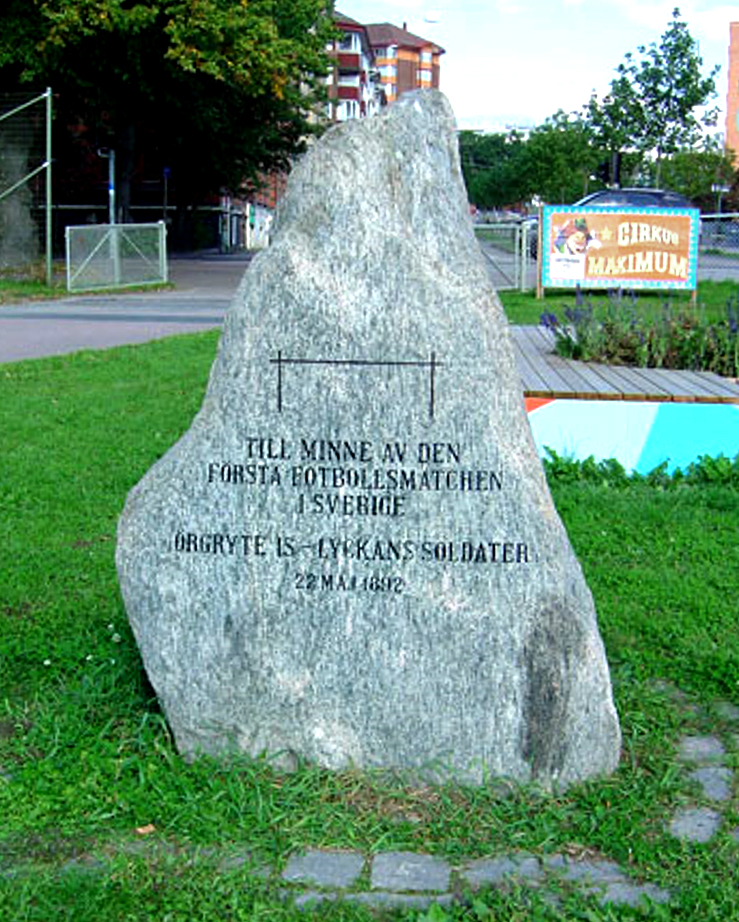
A memorial monument for the first football match played in Sweden, between Örgryte IS and IS Lyckans Soldater in 1892.

IS Lyckans Soldater (full name Idrotssällskapet Lyckans Soldater, commonly abbreviated LS) are a now defunct Swedish sports club located in Gothenburg, mostly remembered for its contribution for introducing association football to Sweden. The club was founded in 1883 but did not play football until 1888, and at that time the code played was Swedish football, not association football.

They were then one of two teams in the first association football match played in Sweden in 1892, the other team being Örgryte IS. The football section of the club merged with Göteborgs Velocipedklubb and Skridskosällskapet Norden to create Göteborgs IF in 1903.

Lyckans Soldater participated in the Gothenburg district series of bandy in the winter of 1916–17.

Eric Lemming, seven-time Olympic medal winner, competed for the club in the first decade of the 20th century.
