= Göteborgs BK =

- Full name: Göteborgs Bollklubb
- Founded: 1875
- Dissolved: after 1887?
- Ground: Heden(?), Gothenburg
- Capacity: Unknown
Home colours	Away colours

Göteborgs BK ("Gothenburg Ball Club") was a Swedish football club which was located in Gothenburg. The club is the oldest football club in Sweden known by name, and the second oldest known club in Sweden, only preceded by an unnamed society from Gothenburg that was mentioned in an article in Göteborgs-Posten in May 1874. Göteborgs BK was founded a year later, in 1875, and most likely only played the code of football known as Swedish football which was similar to, but not identical to association football. The first chairman was G. Bohlander, a wholesaler.

Göteborgs BK was probably one of the clubs that established a set of rules for Swedish football in 1885, along with Stockholms BK, founded in 1879 in Stockholm, and Visby BK from Visby. These three clubs were the leading in the at that time three leading towns in the development of football in Sweden and the rules established were to dominate the Swedish football scene in the following years. The club is also mentioned as having participated in a sport festival arranged by Göteborgs GS, a gymnastics club, on 4 September 1887, during which two of the club's teams played a match of Swedish football against each other on Heden. One of the players of the match was Carl Blidberg or his brother, or possibly both. Carl Blidberg was at the time chairman of the sport club IS Lyckans Soldater, which started playing Swedish football in 1888. Lyckans Soldater also played the first football match ever played on Swedish soil between two Swedish teams using the association football rules, in 1892 against Örgryte IS.

It is unknown when Göteborgs BK ceased to exist. On source claims that the club was re-formed in 1882 as Göteborgs IK, which in turn ceased to exist already sometime around 1885. It is unknown if "re-formed" means that the club had ceased to exist before that or "re-formed" only means that the club was reorganised that year.

The club was also active in other sports, including cricket, athletics and rowing.
