= Johanna Magnusson =

Swedish badminton player (born 1998)

Personal information
- Born: 15 November 1998 (age 27) Malmö, Sweden
- Height: 1.62 m (5 ft 4 in)

Sport
- Country: Sweden
- Sport: Badminton
- Handedness: Left

Women's & mixed doubles
- Highest ranking: 31 (WD with Clara Nistad, 8 November 2022); 98 (XD with Emil Hybel, 17 March 2020)
- BWF profile
Medal record
Women's badminton
Representing Sweden
European Junior Championships
Gold medal – first place	2017 Mulhouse	Girls' doubles

Johanna Magnusson (born 15 November 1998) is a Swedish professional badminton player. She won the gold medal in the girls' doubles event at the 2017 European Junior Championships with her partner Emma Karlsson.

== Achievements ==
=== European Junior Championships ===
Girls' doubles
Year	Venue	Partner	Opponent	Score	Result
2017	Centre Sportif Régional d'Alsace; Mulhouse, France	(Sweden) Emma Karlsson	(Denmark) Alexandra Bøje (Denmark) Julie Dawall Jakobsen	21–14, 21–14	Gold

=== BWF International Challenge/Series (3 titles, 5 runners-up) ===
Women's doubles
Year	Tournament	Partner	Opponent	Score	Result
2018	Swedish Open	(Sweden) Emma Karlsson	(Netherlands) Debora Jille (Netherlands) Imke van der Aar	18–21, 21–11, 21–19	(gold) Winner
2018	Hungarian International	(Sweden) Emma Karlsson	(Russia) Ekaterina Bolotova (Russia) Alina Davletova	14–21, 9–21	(silver) Runner-up
2019	Swedish Open	(Sweden) Emma Karlsson	(Denmark) Amalie Magelund (Denmark) Freja Ravn	15–21, 21–12, 17–21	(silver) Runner-up
2019	Polish International	(Sweden) Emma Karlsson	(Denmark) Amalie Magelund (Denmark) Freja Ravn	21–15, 15–21, 15–21	(silver) Runner-up
2019	Hungarian International	(Sweden) Emma Karlsson	(Canada) Rachel Honderich (Canada) Kristen Tsai	16–21, 16–21	(silver) Runner-up
2019	Norwegian International	(Sweden) Emma Karlsson	(Denmark) Natasja Anthonisen (Denmark) Clara Graversen	20–22, 21–16, 21–10	(gold) Winner
2021	Dutch Open	(Sweden) Clara Nistad	(Netherlands) Debora Jille (Netherlands) Cheryl Seinen	17–21, 21–14, 21–12	(gold) Winner
2022	Swedish Open	(Sweden) Clara Nistad	(Thailand) Chasinee Korepap (Thailand) Jhenicha Sudjaipraparat	16–21, 21–23	(silver) Runner-up

BWF International Challenge tournament
BWF International Series tournament
BWF Future Series tournament

=== BWF Junior Tournament ===
Girls' doubles
Year	Tournament	Partner	Opponent	Score	Result
2014	Portuguese Junior International	(Sweden) Emma Karlsson	(Russia) Yana Ignatyeva (Russia) Kristina Vyrvich	21–17, 21–13	(gold) Winner
2016	Hungarian Junior International	(Sweden) Emma Karlsson	(Thailand) Pattaranan Chamnaktan (Thailand) Kwanchanok Sudjaipraparat	18–21, 21–19, 21–17	(gold) Winner

== Personal life ==
Magnusson comes from a badminton loving family, her mother is Maria Bengtsson, who was once among the top doubles players in the world.
