= Emma Karlsson =

Swedish badminton player (born 1998)

Personal information
- Born: 16 May 1998 (age 28) Älmhult, Sweden
- Height: 1.69 m (5 ft 7 in)

Sport
- Country: Sweden
- Sport: Badminton
- Handedness: Right
- Retired: 14 November 2020

Women's doubles
- Highest ranking: 37 (with Johanna Magnusson 10 September 2019)
- BWF profile
Medal record
Women's badminton
Representing Sweden
European Junior Championships
Gold medal – first place	2017 Mulhouse	Girls' doubles

Emma Karlsson (born 16 May 1998) is a retired Swedish badminton player. She won gold at the 2017 European Junior Championships in the girls' doubles event with her partner, Johanna Magnusson. Karlsson won her first senior international title at the 2018 Swedish Open, and at the 2019 Norwegian International she claimed two titles in the women's and mixed doubles events.

Karlsson retired from the international badminton in November 2020.

== Personal life ==
Karlsson educated Sports Science and Management at the Malmö University, and in 2019, she received an elite sports scholarship from the Swedish Sports Confederation.

== Achievements ==
=== European Junior Championships ===
Girls' doubles

Year	Venue	Partner	Opponent	Score	Result
2017	Centre Sportif Régional d'Alsace, Mulhouse, France	(Sweden) Johanna Magnusson	(Denmark) Alexandra Bøje (Denmark) Julie Dawall Jakobsen	21–14, 21–14	Gold

=== BWF International Challenge/Series (3 titles, 4 runners-up) ===
Women's doubles

Year	Tournament	Partner	Opponent	Score	Result
2018	Swedish Open	(Sweden) Johanna Magnusson	(Netherlands) Debora Jille (Netherlands) Imke van der Aar	18–21, 21–11, 21–19	(gold) Winner
2018	Hungarian International	(Sweden) Johanna Magnusson	(Russia) Ekaterina Bolotova (Russia) Alina Davletova	14–21, 9–21	(silver) Runner-up
2019	Swedish Open	(Sweden) Johanna Magnusson	(Denmark) Amalie Magelund (Denmark) Freja Ravn	15–21, 21–12, 17–21	(silver) Runner-up
2019	Polish International	(Sweden) Johanna Magnusson	(Denmark) Amalie Magelund (Denmark) Freja Ravn	21–15, 15–21, 15–21	(silver) Runner-up
2019	Hungarian International	(Sweden) Johanna Magnusson	(Canada) Rachel Honderich (Canada) Kristen Tsai	16–21, 16–21	(silver) Runner-up
2019	Norwegian International	(Sweden) Johanna Magnusson	(Denmark) Natasja Anthonisen (Denmark) Clara Graversen	20–22, 21–16, 21–10	(gold) Winner

Mixed doubles

Year	Tournament	Partner	Opponent	Score	Result
2019	Norwegian International	(Denmark) Mads Emil Christensen	(France) William Villeger (France) Sharone Bauer	21–19, 16–21, 21–12	(gold) Winner

BWF International Challenge tournament
BWF International Series tournament
BWF Future Series tournament

=== BWF Junior International (2 titles, 2 runners-up) ===
Girls' singles

Year	Tournament	Opponent	Score	Result
2015	Swiss Junior Open	(Denmark) Julie Dawall Jakobsen	13–21, 8–21	(silver) Runner-up

Girls' doubles

Year	Tournament	Partner	Opponent	Score	Result
2014	Portuguese Junior International	(Sweden) Johanna Magnusson	(Russia) Yana Ignatyeva (Russia) Kristina Vyrvich	21–17, 21–13	(gold) Winner
2015	Danish Junior Cup	(Sweden) Johanna Magnusson	(Denmark) Irina Amalie Andersen (Denmark) Julie Dawall Jakobsen	12–21, 20–22	(silver) Runner-up
2016	Hungarian Junior International	(Sweden) Johanna Magnusson	(Thailand) Pattaranan Chamnaktan (Thailand) Kwanchanok Sudjaipraparat	18–21, 21–19, 21–17	(gold) Winner

BWF Junior International Grand Prix tournament
BWF Junior International Challenge tournament
BWF Junior International Series tournament
BWF Junior Future Series tournament
