= List of medalists at the European Junior Badminton Championships =

Below is the list of the medalists at the European Junior Badminton Championships since the first edition in 1969.

== Individual event ==
Legend: MS= Men's singles; WS= Women's singles; MD= Men's doubles; WD= Women's doubles; XD= Mixed doubles

Year	Event	Gold	Silver	Bronze	
1969	MS	(Denmark) Flemming Delfs	(Denmark) Preben Boesen	(Netherlands) Piet Ridder	(England) Ray Stevens
1969	WS	(Denmark) Anne Berglund	(England) Margaret Beck	(Denmark) Annie Bøg Jørgensen	(Netherlands) Joke van Beusekom
1969	MD	(England) Keit Arthur (England) Ray Stevens	(Denmark) Preben Boesen (Denmark) Mogens Neergaard	(Denmark) Flemming Delfs (Denmark) Hans Røpke	(Netherlands) Piet Ridder (Netherlands) Rudy Hartog
1969	WD	(Netherlands) Joke van Beusekom (Netherlands) Marjan Luesken	(England) Margaret Beck (England) Carol Wightman	(Netherlands) Erika Fikenscher (Netherlands) Ingrid Fikenscher	(Denmark) Bente Pedersen (Denmark) Susan Jensen
1969	XD	(Sweden) Gert Perneklo (Sweden) Karin Lindqvist	(Denmark) Mogens Neergaard (Denmark) Bente Pedersen	(England) Ray Stevens (England) Margaret Beck	(Sweden) Bengt Fröman (Sweden) Margareta Söderberg
1971	MS	(Netherlands) Rob Ridder	(Denmark) Søren Christensen	(Denmark) Viggo Christiansen	(Denmark) Ulrik Bo Hansen
1971	WS	(Denmark) Anne Berglund	(Netherlands) Marjan Luesken	(East Germany) Monika Thiere	(Socialist Federal Republic of Yugoslavia) Lucka Krizman
1971	MD	(England) Peter Gardner (England) John Stretch	(Sweden) Sven Ove Kellermalm (Sweden) Häkan Linnarson	(Denmark) Anders Andersen (Denmark) Ulrik Bo Hansen	(Denmark) Søren Christiansen (Denmark) Viggo Christiansen
1971	WD	(Denmark) Anne Berglund (Denmark) Lene Køppen	(England) Nora Gardner (England) Barbara Giles	(Denmark) Lone Rasmussen (Denmark) Susane Mølgaard Hansen	(Netherlands) Marjan Luesken (Netherlands) Henny Wesdorp
1971	XD	(England) Peter Gardner (England) Barbara Giles	(England) John Stretch (England) Nora Gardner	(Denmark) Viggo Christiansen (Denmark) Lene Køppen	(Netherlands) Rob Ridder (Netherlands) Marjan Luesken
1973	MS	(Denmark) Jesper Helledie	(Norway) Peter Thoresen	(Sweden) Willy Nilson	(Sweden) Christian Lundberg
1973	WS	(Denmark) Mette Myhre	(Sweden) Anette Börjesson	(Netherlands) Els van Eeuwijk	(England) Kathleen Whiting
1973	MD	(Sweden) Stefan Karlsson (Sweden) Willy Nilson	(Denmark) Jesper Helledie (Denmark) Jacob Dynnes Hansen	(Scotland) Gordon Hamilton (Scotland) Alan Gilliland	(Sweden) Christian Lundberg (Sweden) Claes Nordin
1973	WD	(England) Ann Forest (England) Kathleen Whiting	(Denmark) Mette Myhre (Denmark) Susanne Berg	(Denmark) Marianne Christensen (Denmark) Susanne Johansen	(England) Kathleen Redhead (England) D. Kirby
1973	XD	(Denmark) Jesper Helledie (Denmark) Susanne Johansen	(Denmark) Hans Olaf Birkholm (Denmark) Mette Myhre	(Denmark) Hans Hjulmand (Denmark) Susanne Berg	(Scotland) Alan Gilliland (Scotland) Christine Heatly
1975	MS	(Sweden) Bruno Wackfelt	(Denmark) Morten Frost	(Sweden) Lars Kotte	(England) Kevin Jolly
1975	WS	(Denmark) Pia Nielsen	(England) Paula Kilvington	(Sweden) Anita Steiner	(Sweden) Inge Borgström
1975	MD	(Sweden) Bruno Wackfelt (Sweden) Göran Sterner	(England) Kevin Jolly (England) Tim Stokes	(Sweden) Häkan Fossto (Sweden) Lars Kotte	(England) Gary Scott (England) Duncan Bridge
1975	WD	(Denmark) Liselotte Gøttsche (Denmark) Lilli B. Pedersen	(Denmark) Pia Nielsen (Denmark) Inge Borgström	(England) Karen Puttick (England) Andrea Tuckett	(England) Paula Kilvington (England) Karen Bridge
1975	XD	(England) Tim Stokes (England) Karen Puttick	(England) Duncan Bridge (England) Lorraine Fowler	(Sweden) Bruno Wackfelt (Sweden) Anita Steiner	(Republic of Ireland) Trevor Woods (Republic of Ireland) Linda Andrews
1977	MS	(England) Andy Goode	(England) Kevin Jolly	(Sweden) Göran Carlsson	(Sweden) Ulf Johansson
1977	WS	(England) Karen Bridge	(Denmark) Kirsten Meier	(Denmark) Agnethe Juul	(Sweden) Carina Andersson
1977	MD	(Denmark) Jesper Toftlund (Denmark) Niels Christensen	(England) Kevin Jolly (England) Nigel Tier	(Denmark) Nils Hansen (Denmark) Jan Hammergaard Hansen	(Sweden) Ulf Johansson (Sweden) Goran Carlsson
1977	WD	(England) Karen Bridge (England) Karen Puttick	(Scotland) Pamela Hamilton (Scotland) Joy Reid	(Scotland) Linda Gardner (Scotland) Jill Crombie	(Denmark) Bente Terkelsen (Denmark) Charlotte Pilgaard
1977	XD	(England) Nigel Tier (England) Karen Puttick	(England) Kevin Jolly (England) Karen Bridge	(Denmark) Jan Hammergaard Hansen (Denmark) Kirsten Meier	(Denmark) Jesper Toftlund (Denmark) Karen Kiil
1979	MS	(Denmark) Jens Peter Nierhoff	(England) Nick Yates	(Soviet Union) Vitaliy Shmakov	(Soviet Union) Eugeniy Dayanov
1979	WS	(Denmark) Kirsten Larsen	(Norway) Else Thoresen	(Denmark) Kirsten Meier	(England) Diane Simpson
1979	MD	(Sweden) Peter Isaksson (Sweden) Jan-Eric Antonsson	(West Germany) Harald Klauer (West Germany) Gerhard Treitinger	(Denmark) Jesper Knudsen (Denmark) Torben Kjær	(England) Nick Yates (England) Christopher Back
1979	WD	(England) Sally Leadbeater (England) Gillian Clark	(Denmark) Charlotte Pilgaard (Denmark) Bettina Kristensen	(Denmark) Kirsten Larsen (Denmark) Kirsten Meier	(England) Diane Simpson (England) Christine Dickinson
1979	XD	(Denmark) Jens Peter Nierhoff (Denmark) Charlotte Pilgaard	(Sweden) Peter Isaksson (Sweden) Lena Axelsson	(Netherlands) Frank van Dongen (Netherlands) Grace Kakiay	(Sweden) Jan-Eric Antonsson (Sweden) Ann Sofi Bergman
1981	MS	(Denmark) Michael Kjeldsen	(England) Steve Butler	(England) Dipak Tailor	(England) Chris Dobson
1981	WS	(England) Helen Troke	(Denmark) Nettie Nielsen	(England) Mary Leeves	(Denmark) Lotte Hartwich
1981	MD	(Denmark) Michael Kjeldsen (Denmark) Mark Christiansen	(England) Dipak Tailor (England) Andy Wood	(England) Chris Dobson (England) Mike Parker	(Denmark) Mogens Nielsen (Denmark) Claus Thomsen
1981	WD	(Denmark) Dorte Kjær (Denmark) Nettie Nielsen	(Sweden) Christine Magnusson (Sweden) Maria Bengtsson	(Denmark) Lise Kissmeyer (Denmark) Annette Bernth	(England) Mary Leeves (England) Sara Leeves
1981	XD	(England) Dipak Tailor (England) Mary Leeves	(Denmark) Mark Christiansen (Denmark) Dorte Kjær	(England) Chris Dobson (England) Gillian Gowers	(England) Steve Butler (England) Fiona Elliott
1983	MS	(Denmark) Claus Thomsen	(Denmark) Karsten Schulz	(Netherlands) Pierre Pelupessy	(Sweden) Stellan Österberg
1983	WS	(England) Helen Troke	(Sweden) Christine Magnusson	(Denmark) Birgitte Hindse	(Denmark) Dorthe Lynge
1983	MD	(Wales) Chris Rees (Wales) Lyndon Williams	(Denmark) Claus Thomsen (Denmark) Karsten Schulz	(England) Darren Hall (England) Stuart Spurling	(England) Timothy Moseley (England) P. Walden
1983	WD	(England) Lisa Chapman (England) Jane Shipman	(Sweden) Christine Magnusson (Sweden) Jeanette Kuhl	(Netherlands) Astrid van der Knaap (Netherlands) Nicole van Zijderveld	(Scotland) Gillian Martin (Scotland) Jennifer Allen
1983	XD	(Denmark) Anders Nielsen (Denmark) Gitte Paulsen	(Sweden) Stellan Österberg (Sweden) Christine Magnusson	(West Germany) Ralf Rausch (West Germany) Susanne Altmann	(England) Timothy Moseley (England) Lisa Chapman
1985	MS	(England) Matthew Smith	(Denmark) Jan Paulsen	(Denmark) Peter Knudsen	(Denmark) Lars Pedersen
1985	WS	(Denmark) Lisbeth Stuer-Lauridsen	(Denmark) Lotte Olsen	(Sweden) Charlotta Wihlborg	(West Germany) Katrin Schmidt
1985	MD	(Denmark) Jan Paulsen (Denmark) Lars Pedersen	(Denmark) Johnny Børglum (Denmark) Max Gandrup	(Norway) Hans Sperre jr. (Norway) Jørn Myrestrand	(Sweden) Peter Axelsson (Sweden) Mikael Lunqvist
1985	WD	(Denmark) Lisbeth Stuer-Lauridsen (Denmark) Lotte Olsen	(England) Sara Halsall (England) Debbie Hore	(Sweden) Claire Palmer (Sweden) Cheryl Johnsson	(Denmark) Marian Christiansen (Denmark) Charlotte Jacobsen
1985	XD	(Denmark) Jan Paulsen (Denmark) Marian Christiansen	(Denmark) Max Gandrup (Denmark) Charlotte Jacobsen	(Scotland) Alan McMillan (Scotland) Aileen Nairn	(Soviet Union) Andrey Antropov (Soviet Union) Tatyana Volchek
1987	MS	(Finland) Pontus Jäntti	(Denmark) Michael Søgaard	(Denmark) Thomas Madsen	(Denmark) Johnny Sørensen
1987	WS	(Denmark) Helle Andersen	(England) Joanne Muggeridge	(Sweden) Catrine Bengtsson	(Scotland) Anne Gibson
1987	MD	(Denmark) Michael Søgaard (Denmark) Jens Maibom	(Sweden) Thomas Olsen (Sweden) Frederik Lindqvist	(Netherlands) Rob Stalenhof (Netherlands) Randy Trieling	(England) Christopher Hunt (England) Andrew Fairhurst
1987	WD	(Sweden) Catrine Bengtsson (Sweden) Margit Borg	(England) Julie Munday (England) Tracy Dineen	(Denmark) Helle Andersen (Denmark) Charlotte Madsen	(Denmark) Trine Johansson (Denmark) Marlene Thomsen
1987	XD	(Denmark) Jens Maibom (Denmark) Charlotte Madsen	(Sweden) Jonas Ericsson (Sweden) Margit Borg	(Netherlands) Randy Trieling (Netherlands) Sonja Mellink	(England) Richard Harmsworth (England) Tracy Dineen
1989	MS	(Denmark) Thomas Stuer-Lauridsen	(Denmark) Morten Hummelmose	(Netherlands) Chris Bruil	(England) Stefan Pandya
1989	WS	(Denmark) Camilla Martin	(Denmark) Helene Kirkegaard	(Netherlands) Elvira van Elven	(Denmark) Trine Johansson
1989	MD	(Denmark) Thomas Stuer-Lauridsen (Denmark) Christian Jacobsen	(England) Anthony Bush (England) Ashley Spencer	(England) John Quinn (England) Neil Cottrill	(Netherlands) Jeroen van Dijk (Netherlands) Chris Bruil
1989	WD	(Denmark) Marlene Thomsen (Denmark) Trine Johansson	(Denmark) Helene Kirkegaard (Denmark) Camilla Martin	(Sweden) Astrid Crabo (Sweden) Veronica Sandberg	(West Germany) Kerstin Weinborner (West Germany) Karen Stechmann
1989	XD	(Denmark) Christian Jacobsen (Denmark) Marlene Thomsen	(England) William Mellersh (England) Joanne Wright	(Soviet Union) Sergey Melnikov (Soviet Union) Aushrina Gabrinayta	(West Germany) Michael Helber (West Germany) Kerstin Weinborner
1991	MS	(Austria) Jürgen Koch	(Netherlands) Joris van Soerland	(Soviet Union) Vladislav Druzhchenko	(England) Simon Archer
1991	WS	(Denmark) Lotte Thomsen	(Denmark) Anne Søndergaard	(Denmark) Mette Pedersen	(England) Alison Humby
1991	MD	(Denmark) Martin Lundgaard Hansen (Denmark) Peter Christensen	(Soviet Union) Vladislav Druzhchenko (Soviet Union) Valeriy Streltsov	(England) Ian Pearson (England) James Anderson	(Denmark) Jim Laugesen (Denmark) Thomas Damgaard
1991	WD	(Denmark) Trine Pedersen (Denmark) Mette Pedersen	(England) Alison Humby (England) Joanne Wright	(Netherlands) Nicole van Hooren (Netherlands) Brenda Conijn	(Sweden) Karolina Ericsson (Sweden) Lotta Andersson
1991	XD	(Denmark) Peter Christensen (Denmark) Rikke Broen	(Netherlands) Joris van Soerland (Netherlands) Nicole van Hooren	(Soviet Union) Valeriy Streltsov (Soviet Union) Svetlana Alferova	(England) Simon Archer (England) Joanne Davies
1993	MS	(Denmark) Jim Laugesen	(Sweden) Rasmus Wengberg	(Sweden) Daniel Eriksson	(England) Steve Isaac
1993	WS	(Denmark) Mette Sørensen	(Russia) Marina Andrievskaya	(Denmark) Lone Sørensen	(Denmark) Rikke Olsen
1993	MD	(Denmark) Jim Laugesen (Denmark) Janek Roos	(Denmark) Thomas Søgaard (Denmark) Thomas Stavngaard	(England) Richard Doling (England) Roger Mistri	(Sweden) Daniel Eriksson (Sweden) Rasmus Wengberg
1993	WD	(Denmark) Mette Sørensen (Denmark) Rikke Olsen	(Denmark) Lone Sørensen (Denmark) Sara Runesten	(Germany) Nicole Grether (Germany) Sandra Beissel	(Russia) Ekaterina Karhushina (Russia) Marina Kurochkina
1993	XD	(Denmark) Thomas Stavngaard (Denmark) Sara Runesten	(Sweden) Johan Tholinsson (Sweden) Pernilla Carlsson	(Netherlands) Rolf Monteiro (Netherlands) Manon Albinus	(England) Lee Boosey (England) Sarah Hardaker
1995	MS	(Denmark) Peter Gade	(England) Mark Constable	(Netherlands) Dennis Lens	(Denmark) Kasper Ødum
1995	WS	(Netherlands) Brenda Beenhakker	(Denmark) Mette Justesen	(Denmark) Pernille Harder	(Russia) Elena Suchareva
1995	MD	(Denmark) Peter Gade (Denmark) Peder Nissen	(Denmark) Jonas Rasmussen (Denmark) Søren Hansen	(Sweden) Henrik Andersson (Sweden) Björn Logius	(Bulgaria) Todor Velkov (Bulgaria) Boris Kessov
1995	WD	(England) Joanne Wright (England) Donna Kellogg	(Russia) Ella Karachkova (Russia) Natalia Djachhkova	(England) Gail Emms (England) Ella Miles	(Denmark) Mette Hansen (Denmark) Mette Schjoldager
1995	XD	(Denmark) Peder Nissen (Denmark) Mette Hansen	(Denmark) Jonas Rasmussen (Denmark) Pernille Harder	(England) Ian Sullivan (England) Joanne Wright	(Sweden) Henrik Andersson (Sweden) Anna Lundin
1997	MS	(Netherlands) Dicky Palyama	(Wales) Richard Vaughan	(Russia) Nikolaj Nikolaenko	(Denmark) Kasper Ødum
1997	WS	(Netherlands) Judith Meulendijks	(Denmark) Tine Rasmussen	(Russia) Ella Karachkova	(England) Donna Kellogg
1997	MD	(Denmark) Kasper Ødum (Denmark) Ove Svejstrup	(Denmark) Kristian Langbak (Denmark) Frederik Köhler	(Sweden) Johan Holm (Sweden) Patrik Jsaksson	(Germany) Joachim Tesche (Germany) Thomas Tesche
1997	WD	(Denmark) Lene Mørk (Denmark) Jane Bramsen	(Denmark) Jane Jacoby (Denmark) Britta Andersen	(Russia) Maria Kool (Russia) Maria Sofronova	(Russia) Zhanna Chornenkaja (Russia) Ella Karachkova
1997	XD	(Denmark) Ove Svejstrup (Denmark) Britta Andersen	(Denmark) Kristian Langbak (Denmark) Jane Bramsen	(Denmark) Kasper Ødum (Denmark) Lene Mørk	(England) David Lindley (England) Donna Kellogg
1999	MS	(Germany) Björn Joppien	(Netherlands) Eric Pang	(Poland) Przemysław Wacha	(England) Ben Hume
1999	WS	(Germany) Petra Overzier	(Russia) Victoria Kosheleva	(Poland) Kamila Augustyn	(Germany) Anne Honscheid
1999	MD	(Denmark) Mathias Boe (Denmark) Kasper Kiim Jensen	(Poland) Przemysław Wacha (Poland) Piotr Zoladek	(England) Kristian Roebuck (England) Oliver Bush	(France) Jean-Michel Lefort (France) Olivier Fossy
1999	WD	(Germany) Petra Overzier (Germany) Anne Honscheid	(Denmark) Helle Nielsen (Denmark) Karina Sørensen	(Scotland) Fiona Sneddon (Scotland) Carol Tedman	(England) Liza Parker (England) Suzanne Rayappan
1999	XD	(Denmark) Mathias Boe (Denmark) Karina Sørensen	(Germany) Sebastian Schmidt (Germany) Anna Honscheid	(Russia) Alexej Vasiljev (Russia) Anastasia Russkikh	(Denmark) Jonas Glyager Jensen (Denmark) Helle Nielsen
2001	MS	(Netherlands) Eric Pang	(Denmark) Joachim Persson	(Sweden) Gustav Ihrlund	(Russia) Sergey Ivlev
2001	WS	(Germany) Juliane Schenk	(Poland) Kamila Augustyn	(Germany) Petra Overzier	(Bulgaria) Petya Nedelcheva
2001	MD	(Denmark) Carsten Mogensen (Denmark) Rasmus Andersen	(Denmark) Peter Hasbak (Denmark) Rune Ulsing	(Germany) Jan Junker (Germany) Marc Zwiebler	(England) James Boxall (England) Steven Higgins
2001	WD	(Poland) Kamila Augustyn (Belarus) Nadieżda Kostiuczyk	(Germany) Carina Mette (Germany) Juliane Schenk	(Russia) Anastasia Russkikh (Russia) Elena Shimko	(Bulgaria) Petya Nedelcheva (Bulgaria) Maya Ivanova
2001	XD	(Denmark) Rasmus Andersen (Denmark) Mette Nielsen	(Denmark) Carsten Mogensen (Denmark) Kamilla Rytter Juhl	(Denmark) Peter Hasbak (Denmark) Lena Frier Kristiansen	(Germany) Marc Zwiebler (Germany) Birgit Overzier
2003	MS	(Germany) Marc Zwiebler	(Denmark) Rune Ulsing	(Finland) Ville Lång	(Poland) Rafał Hawel
2003	WS	(Ukraine) Larisa Griga	(Denmark) Nanna Brosolat Jensen	(Finland) Maria Vaisänen	(England) Jenny Day
2003	MD	(Denmark) Mikkel Delbo Larsen (Denmark) Martin Bille Larsen	(Denmark) Søren Frandsen (Denmark) Mads Hallas	(Russia) Ivan Baboschin (Russia) Anton Nazarenko	(Netherlands) Ruud Bosch (Netherlands) Dave Khodabux
2003	WD	(Russia) Nina Vislova (Russia) Valeria Sorokina	(Germany) Therésè Nawrath (Germany) Birgit Overzier	(Russia) Olga Kozlova (Russia) Anastasia Kudinova	(Germany) Carola Bott (Germany) Karin Schnaase
2003	XD	(Germany) Marc Zwiebler (Germany) Birgit Overzier	(Russia) Dimitri Pankov (Russia) Nina Vislova	(Russia) Anton Nazarenko (Russia) Valeria Sorokina	(Denmark) Jacob Chemnitz (Denmark) Mille Pledsted
2005	MS	(England) Rajiv Ouseph	(Germany) Dieter Domke	(Scotland) Calum Menzies	(Denmark) Hans-Kristian Vittinghus
2005	WS	(Germany) Janet Köhler	(Switzerland) Jeanine Cicognini	(Bulgaria) Linda Zechiri	(Czech Republic) Pavla Janošová
2005	MD	(Denmark) Rasmus Bonde (Denmark) Kasper Henriksen	(England) Robert Adcock (England) Edward Foster	(France) Brice Leverdez (France) Mathieu Lo Ying Ping	(Germany) Jan-Sören Schultz (Germany) Tim Zander
2005	WD	(Russia) Nina Vislova (Russia) Olga Kozlova	(Denmark) Christinna Pedersen (Denmark) Line Damkjær Kruse	(Czech Republic) Kristína Ludíková (Belarus) Olga Konon	(Russia) Anastasia Kudinova (Russia) Anastasia Prokopenko
2005	XD	(Denmark) Rasmus Bonde (Denmark) Christinna Pedersen	(England) Robert Adcock (England) Jenny Wallwork	(Russia) Vladimir Ivanov (Russia) Olga Kozlova	(Russia) Vladimir Malkov (Russia) Nina Vislova
2007	MS	(Denmark) Mads Conrad-Petersen	(Sweden) Gabriel Ulldahl	(Netherlands) Lester Oey	(Spain) Ernesto Velázquez
2007	WS	(Denmark) Karina Jørgensen	(England) Michelle Cheung	(Belarus) Olga Konon	(Netherlands) Patty Stolzenbach
2007	MD	(England) Peter Mills (England) Chris Adcock	(Denmark) Mads Pieler Kolding (Denmark) Mads Conrad-Petersen	(Germany) Peter Kaesbauer (Germany) Lukas Schmidt	(Denmark) Christian Skovgaard (Denmark) Christian Larsen
2007	WD	(Czech Republic) Kristína Ludíková (Belarus) Olga Konon	(Denmark) Joan Christiansen (Denmark) Line Damkjær Kruse	(England) Samantha Ward (England) Sarah Walker	(England) Gabrielle White (England) Mariana Agathangelou
2007	XD	(Denmark) Christian Larsen (Denmark) Joan Christiansen	(Germany) Peter Kaesbauer (Germany) Julia Schmidt	(Denmark) Mikkel Elbjørn (Denmark) Maja Bech	(Denmark) Mads Pieler Kolding (Denmark) Line Damkjaer Kruse
2009	MS	(Denmark) Emil Holst	(Wales) Jamie van Hooijdonk	(Finland) Kasper Lehikoinen	(Denmark) Steffen Rasmussen
2009	WS	(Denmark) Anne Hald Jensen	(Spain) Carolina Marín	(Russia) Natalia Perminova	(Belgium) Lianne Tan
2009	MD	(France) Sylvain Grosjean (Republic of Ireland) Sam Magee	(Denmark) Emil Holst (Denmark) Mads Pedersen	(Denmark) Niclas Nøhr (Denmark) Steffen Rasmussen	(Germany) Jonas Geigenberger (Germany) Andreas Heinz
2009	WD	(Russia) Anastasia Chervaykova (Russia) Romina Gabdullina	(Netherlands) Selena Piek (Netherlands) Iris Tabeling	(England) Jessica Fletcher (England) Sarah Milne	(Russia) Elena Komendrovskaya (Russia) Ksenia Polikarpova
2009	XD	(Netherlands) Jacco Arends (Netherlands) Selena Piek	(Germany) Jonas Geigenberger (Germany) Fabienne Deprez	(England) Ben Stawski (England) Lauren Smith	(Denmark) Morten Bødskov (Denmark) Sara Thygesen
2011	MS	(Denmark) Viktor Axelsen	(Denmark) Rasmus Fladberg	(Finland) Kasper Lehikoinen	(Turkey) Emre Lale
2011	WS	(Spain) Carolina Marín	(Spain) Beatriz Corrales	(Turkey) Özge Bayrak	(Germany) Fabienne Deprez
2011	MD	(England) Chris Coles (England) Matthew Nottingham	(Germany) Fabian Holzer (Germany) Max Schwenger	(Denmark) Kim Astrup Sorensen (Denmark) Rasmus Fladberg	(France) Lucas Corvee (France) Joris Grosjean
2011	WD	(Denmark) Mette Poulsen (Denmark) Ditte Strunge Larsen	(Netherlands) Thamar Peters (Netherlands) Josephine Wentholt	(Germany) Isabel Herttrich (Germany) Inken Wienefeld	(Denmark) Sandra-Maria Jensen (Denmark) Line Kjaersfeldt
2011	XD	(Denmark) Kim Astrup Sorensen (Denmark) Line Kjaersfeldt	(England) Matthew Nottingham (England) Helena Lewczynska	(Germany) Max Schwenger (Germany) Isabel Herttrich	(Netherlands) Jim Middelburg (Netherlands) Soraya De Visch Eijbergen
2013	MS	(Germany) Fabian Roth	(Netherlands) Mark Caljouw	(Austria) Matthias Almer	(England) Rhys Walker
2013	WS	(Bulgaria) Stefani Stoeva	(Denmark) Line Kjærsfeldt	(Turkey) Neslihan Yiğit	(France) Delphine Lansac
2013	MD	(Denmark) Kasper Antonsen (Denmark) Oliver Babic	(Denmark) Mathias Christiansen (Denmark) David Daugaard	(France) Antoine Lodiot (France) Julien Maio	(Germany) Johannes Pistorius (Germany) Marvin Emil Seidel
2013	WD	(Bulgaria) Gabriela Stoeva (Bulgaria) Stefani Stoeva	(Denmark) Julie Finne-Ipsen (Denmark) Rikke Soby Hansen	(Russia) Victoria Dergunova (Russia) Evgeniya Kosetskaya	(Turkey) Busenur Korkmaz (Turkey) Özge Toyran
2013	XD	(Denmark) David Daugaard (Denmark) Maiken Fruergaard	(Netherlands) Robin Tabeling (Netherlands) Myke Halkema	(Denmark) Kasper Antonsen (Denmark) Julie Finne-Ipsen	(Germany) Mark Lamsfuß (Germany) Franziska Volkmann
2015	MS	(Denmark) Anders Antonsen	(Germany) Max Weißkirchen	(France) Toma Junior Popov	(Turkey) Muhammed Ali Kurt
2015	WS	(Denmark) Mia Blichfeldt	(Denmark) Julie Dawall Jakobsen	(Germany) Luise Heim	(Turkey) Aliye Demirbağ
2015	MD	(Denmark) Alexander Bond (Denmark) Joel Eipe	(England) Ben Lane (England) Sean Vendy	(Denmark) Mathias Bay-Smidt (Denmark) Frederik Mortensen	(Scotland) Adam Hall (Scotland) Alexander Dunn
2015	WD	(Denmark) Julie Dawall Jakobsen (Denmark) Ditte Soby Hansen	(France) Verlaine Faulmann (France) Anne Tran	(Estonia) Kristin Kuuba (Estonia) Helina Rüütel	(Germany) Eva Janssens (Germany) Yvonne Li
2015	XD	(Germany) Max Weißkirchen (Germany) Eva Janssens	(Denmark) Frederik Mortensen (Denmark) Sara Lundgaard	(England) Ben Lane (England) Jessica Pugh	(France) Alexandre Hammer (France) Anne Tran
2017	MS	(France) Toma Junior Popov	(France) Arnaud Merklé	(England) David Jones	(Netherlands) Joran Kweekel
2017	WS	(Denmark) Julie Dawall Jakobsen	(Ukraine) Maryna Ilyinskaya	(Germany) Yvonne Li	(Denmark) Irina Amalie Andersen
2017	MD	(France) Thom Gicquel (France) Toma Junior Popov	(England) Max Flynn (England) Callum Hemming	(Denmark) Daniel Lundgaard (Denmark) Jesper Toft	(Poland) Robert Cybulski (Poland) Paweł Śmiłowski
2017	WD	(Sweden) Emma Karlsson (Sweden) Johanna Magnusson	(Denmark) Alexandra Bøje (Denmark) Julie Dawall Jakobsen	(Denmark) Amalie Magelund (Denmark) Freja Ravn	(Poland) Wiktoria Dąbczyńska (Poland) Aleksandra Goszczyńska
2017	XD	(Russia) Rodion Alimov (Russia) Alina Davletova	(Scotland) Alexander Dunn (Scotland) Eleanor O'Donnell	(Poland) Paweł Śmiłowski (Poland) Magdalena Świerczyńska	(Slovenia) Miha Ivanič (Slovenia) Nika Arih
2018	MS	(France) Arnaud Merklé	(France) Christo Popov	(Republic of Ireland) Nhat Nguyen	(Germany) Lukas Resch
2018	WS	(Denmark) Line Christophersen	(Denmark) Amalie Schulz	(Hungary) Vivien Sándorházi	(Hungary) Réka Madarász
2018	MD	(France) Fabien Delrue (France) William Villeger	(Scotland) Christopher Grimley (Scotland) Matthew Grimley	(France) Maxime Briot (France) Kenji Lovang	(Denmark) Mads Muurholm (Denmark) Mads Vestergaard
2018	WD	(Turkey) Bengisu Erçetin (Turkey) Nazlıcan İnci	(Denmark) Amalie Magelund (Denmark) Freja Ravn	(Ukraine) Anastasiya Prozorova (Ukraine) Valeriya Rudakova	(Turkey) Ec Sare Başakın (Turkey) Zehra Erdem
2018	XD	(France) Fabien Delrue (France) Juliette Moinard	(Netherlands) Wessel van der Aar (Netherlands) Alyssa Tirtosentono	(Germany) Lukas Resch (Germany) Emma Moszczynski	(Denmark) Mads Vestergaard (Denmark) Christine Busch
2020	MS	(France) Christo Popov	(France) Yanis Gaudin	(Germany) Matthias Kicklitz	(Finland) Joakim Oldorff
2020	WS	(Russia) Anastasiia Shapovalova	(Sweden) Edith Urell	(Serbia) Marija Sudimac	(Finland) Nella Nyqvist
2020	MD	(Denmark) William Kryger Boe (Denmark) Mads Vestergaard	(Russia) Egor Kholkin (Russia) Georgii Lebedev	(Germany) Kilian Ming-Zhe Maurer (Germany) Matthias Schnabel	(Serbia) Sergej Lukić (Serbia) Mihajlo Tomić
2020	WD	(Russia) Anastasiia Boiarun (Russia) Alena Iakovleva	(Germany) Leona Michalski (Germany) Thuc Phuong Nguyen	(Denmark) Clara Løber (Denmark) Mette Werge	(Ukraine) Polina Buhrova (Ukraine) Mariia Stoliarenko
2020	XD	(Germany) Matthias Kicklitz (Germany) Thuc Phuong Nguyen	(Sweden) Gustav Bjorkler (Sweden) Edith Urell	(Russia) Lev Barinov (Russia) Anastasiia Boiarun	(France) Christo Popov (France) Flavie Vallet
2022	MS	(France) Alex Lanier	(Denmark) Jakob Houe	(Denmark) Christian Faust Kjær	(Poland) Dominik Kwinta
2022	WS	(Bulgaria) Kaloyana Nalbantova	(England) Lisa Curtin	(Finland) Nella Nyqvist	(Denmark) Benedicte Sillassen
2022	MD	(Denmark) Jakob Houe (Denmark) Christian Faust Kjær	(Spain) Daniel Franco (Spain) Rubén García	(France) Natan Begga (France) Baptiste Labarthe	(Denmark) Hjalte Johansen (Denmark) Jeppe Søby
2022	WD	(Spain) Nikol Carulla (Spain) Lucía Rodríguez	(England) Lisa Curtin (England) Estelle van Leeuwen	(Denmark) Emma Irring Braüner (Denmark) Sofie Røjkjær	(Switzerland) Lucie Amiguet (Switzerland) Vera Appenzeller
2022	XD	(France) Lucas Renoir (France) Téa Margueritte	(Germany) Jarne Schlevoigt (Germany) Julia Meyer	(Denmark) Hjalte Johansen (Denmark) Emma Irring Braüner	(Denmark) Jeppe Søby (Denmark) Sofie Røjkjær
2024	MS	(Poland) Mateusz Gołaś	(France) Arthur Tatranov	(Portugal) Tiago Berenguer	(Scotland) Matthew Waring
2024	WS	(Bulgaria) Kaloyana Nalbantova	(Turkey) Ravza Bodur	(Czech Republic) Lucie Krulová	(Republic of Ireland) Siofra Flynn
2024	MD	(France) Thibault Gardon (France) Tom Lalot Trescarte	(Denmark) Robert Nebel (Denmark) Otto Reiler	(Denmark) Phillip Kryger Boe (Denmark) Jesper Østergaard Christensen	(Germany) Danial Marzuan (Germany) Mark Niemann
2024	WD	(France) Elsa Jacob (France) Camille Pognante	(Denmark) Amanda Aarrebo Petersen (Denmark) Maria Højlund Tommerup	(Spain) Macarena Izquierdo (Spain) Carmen Maria Jimenez	(Germany) Shreya Hochscheid (Germany) Marie Sophie Stern
2024	XD	(France) Thibault Gardon (France) Kathell Desmots-Chacun	(Denmark) Otto Reiler (Denmark) Amanda Aarrebo Petersen	(Spain) Adolfo Lopez (Spain) Carmen Maria Jimenez	(Turkey) Buğra Aktaş (Turkey) Sinem Yildiz

== Team event ==
Year	Gold	Silver	Bronze	
1975	Denmark	England	Sweden	
1977	England	Denmark	Sweden	
1979	Denmark	England	Sweden	
1981	Denmark	England	Sweden	
1983	England	Denmark	Sweden	
1985	Denmark	England	Sweden	
1987	Denmark	England	Sweden	
1989	Denmark	England	Sweden	
1991	Soviet Union	Netherlands	Denmark	
1993	Denmark	Sweden	Russia	
1995	Denmark	Sweden	England	
1997	Denmark	Russia	Netherlands	
1999	Germany	Russia	Denmark	
2001	Germany	Denmark	Russia	
2003	Germany	Denmark	Russia	
2005	Denmark	Russia	Germany	
2007	England	Netherlands	Denmark	
2009	Denmark	Netherlands	England	Germany
2011	Germany	Russia	Denmark	Ukraine
2013	Denmark	France	Germany	Netherlands
2015	Spain	England	Denmark	France
2017	France	Russia	Denmark	England
2018	France	Denmark	Germany	Russia
2020	Denmark	France	Estonia	Russia
2022	Denmark	France	Spain	Ukraine
2024	Denmark	France	Poland	Netherlands
2026	France	Denmark	Germany	Turkey
