= Linda Andrews =

Linda Andrews may refer to:

- Linda Andrews (singer) (born 1973), Danish singer
- Linda Andrews (Casualty), fictional character from Casualty
- Linda Andrews (badminton), a medalist at the European Junior Badminton Championships
