= Marc Zwiebler =

German badminton player (born 1984)

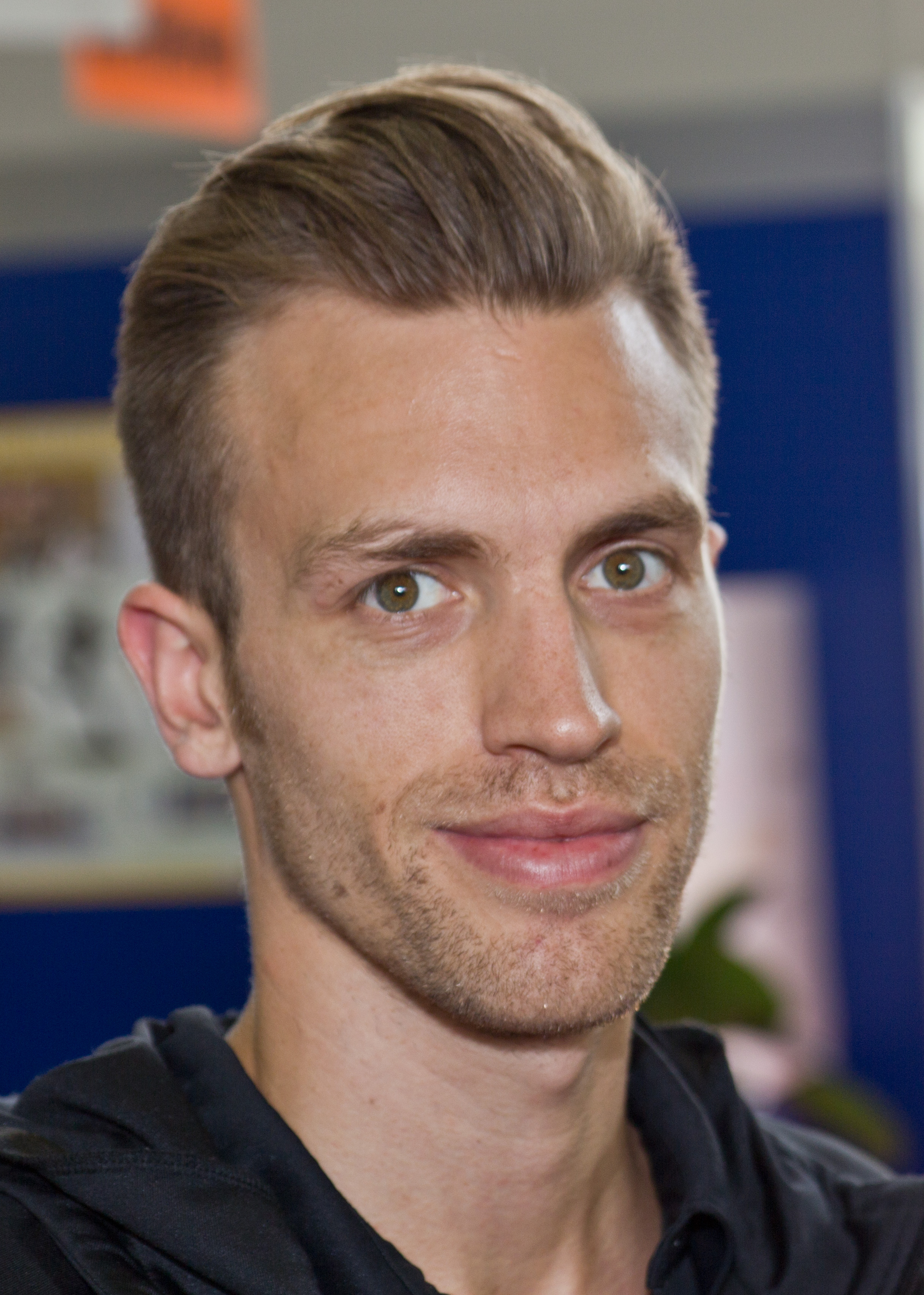
- Zwiebler in Mainz, 2012

Personal information
- Born: 13 March 1984 (age 42) Bonn-Bad Godesberg, West Germany
- Years active: 2000; 2017
- Height: 1.81 m (5 ft 11 in)
- Weight: 73 kg (161 lb; 11.5 st)

Sport
- Country: Germany
- Sport: Badminton
- Handedness: Left
- Coached by: Holger Hasse; Jacob Øhlenschlæger; Xuyan Wang

Men's singles
- Career title: 16
- Highest ranking: 10 (5 May 2016)
- BWF profile
Medal record
Men's badminton
Representing Germany
European Championships
| Gold medal – first place | 2012 Karlskrona | Men's singles |
| Bronze medal – third place | 2010 Manchester | Men's singles |
| Bronze medal – third place | 2016 La Roche-sur-Yon | Men's singles |
European Mixed Team Championships
| Gold medal – first place | 2013 Moscow | Mixed team |
| Silver medal – second place | 2011 Amsterdam | Mixed team |
| Bronze medal – third place | 2015 Leuven | Mixed team |
| Bronze medal – third place | 2017 Lubin | Mixed team |
European Men's Team Championships
| Silver medal – second place | 2006 Thessalonica | Men's team |
| Silver medal – second place | 2012 Amsterdam | Men's team |
| Bronze medal – third place | 2008 Almere | Men's team |
| Bronze medal – third place | 2010 Warsaw | Men's team |
| Bronze medal – third place | 2014 Basel | Men's team |
| Bronze medal – third place | 2016 Kazan | Men's team |
| Bronze medal – third place | 2018 Kazan | Men's team |
European Junior Championships
| Gold medal – first place | 2003 Esbjerg | Boys' singles |
| Gold medal – first place | 2003 Esbjerg | Mixed doubles |
| Gold medal – first place | 2003 Esbjerg | Mixed team |
| Bronze medal – third place | 2001 Spała | Boys' doubles |
| Bronze medal – third place | 2001 Spała | Mixed doubles |

Marc Zwiebler (German pronunciation: [ˈmaʁk ˈtsviːblɐ], born 13 March 1984) is a German former professional badminton player. His highest ranking is 10 in the world. He is a seven-time German national champion in men's singles. He won gold at the 2012 European Championships in Karlskrona over Henri Hurskainen 21–15, 21–13. 2010 he won bronze behind Peter Gade and Jan Ø. Jørgensen. By reaching the third round at the 2008 Olympics and the final of 2009 Denmark Open, one of premier tournament competition series BWF World Superseries, Zwiebler is considered as Germany's top badminton player of all time.

== Badminton career ==
Zwiebler started at the age of six years to play badminton. Soon, he was regarded as the biggest German talent. He was 19 times German youth and junior champion in 2003 he became European junior champion and won his first international title at the senior.

In 2005, he was plagued by pain in the back, he thought was ordinary sore muscles until the pain had worsened significantly and he could no longer play just before Christmas 2005. With the diagnosis of herniated disc, his career was in jeopardy and thus moved his dream of participating at the 2008 Olympics in Beijing in further distance. After an operation in late 2006 and six months of rehabilitation and fitness training with a total of one and a half year absence, he started to chase after the Olympic qualification. After the enforced break, he was given no more in the world ranking, but within eight months he fought his way, including six European Badminton Circuit titles in 27th place in the world ranking and gave themselves enough to make participation in the Olympics.

At the 2008 Olympics, Zwiebler beat Ireland's Scott Evans in the first round and England's Andrew Smith in the second round, each in three sets. As the first German player ever he went there one last sixteen, but lost to South Korea's Lee Hyun-il 13–21, 23–25.

At 2009 World Championships in Hyderabad, he lost to Kenichi Tago in the second round 15–21, 10–21.

At 2009 Denmark Open, Zwiebler defeated the number four seeded Malaysia's Wong Choong Hann in the first round in three sets. It was followed by a victory over his unseeded compatriot Muhammad Hafiz Hashim in three sets before he won against the number eight seeded China's Chen Long in two sets. In the semifinals, he finally won over the reigning World Cup bronze medalist and runner-up of 2007 Indonesia's Sony Dwi Kuncoro in three sets. He became the first ever German to reach the final of a Super Series tournament in Denmark, but lost to Indonesia's Simon Santoso 14–21, 6–21.

At prestigious 2011 All England, Zwiebler beat the reigning world champion China's Chen Jin 21–18, 22–20 in the second round, but was defeated in the semifinals by the 2008 Olympic champion and four-time world champion, China's Lin Dan 9–21, 21–16, 11–21.

He also steered Germany into the semi-finals of the 2010 European Men's Team Championships, where they lost to eventual champions Denmark. Later that year, he gained a bronze medal at the European Championships after losing to Peter Gade in the semifinals in a thrilling match 21–18, 12–21, 17–21.

In July 2011, Zwiebler won the Canada Open and thus his first BWF Grand Prix title. In the final he beat the 2004 Olympic champion and 2005 world champion Taufik Hidayat 21–13, 25–23.

In April 2017, Zwiebler announced his retirement on his personal Facebook page. He stated that the European Championships, Sudirman Cup, Thailand Open, Indonesia Open, and 2017 BWF World Championships will be his last tournaments.

== Results ==
=== Men's singles ===
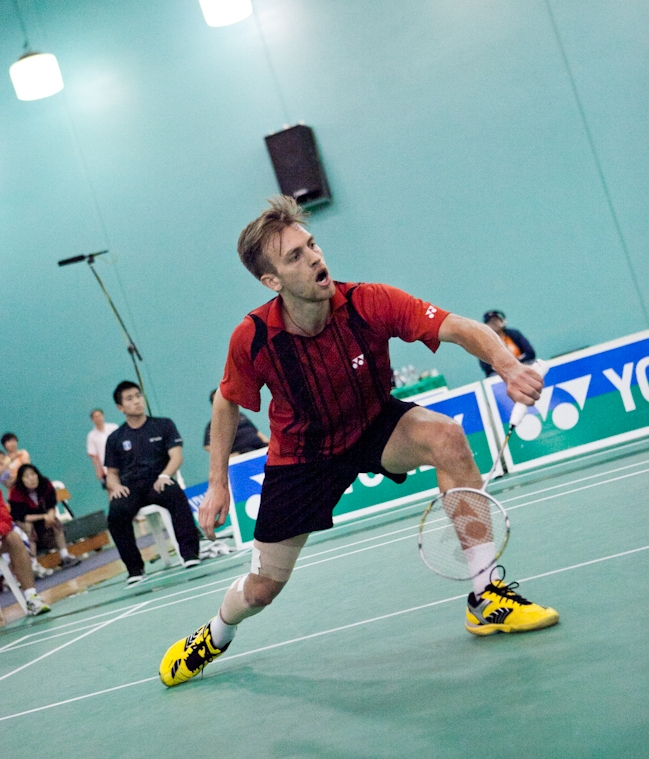
Marc Zwiebler at 2011 U.S. Open in Orange, California

| Outcome | Year | Venue / Tournament | Last opponent | Score |
|---|---|---|---|---|
Olympic Games
| 9/16 | 2008 | Beijing | (South Korea) Lee Hyun-il | 13–21, 11–21 |
| 9/16 | 2012 | London | (China) Chen Jin | 21–19, 12–21, 9–21 |
IBF/BWF World Championships
| 9/16 | 2010 | Paris | (Denmark) Peter Gade | 14–21, 15–21 |
| 9/16 | 2013 | Guangzhou | (Indonesia) Tommy Sugiarto | 19–21, 14–21 |
| 17/32 | 2009 | Hyderabad | (Japan) Kenichi Tago | 15–21, 10–21 |
| 17/32 | 2011 | London | (Spain) Pablo Abián | 17–21, 21–7, 22–24 |
| 17/32 | 2014 | Copenhagen | (China) Chen Long | 11–21, 10–21 |
| 17/32 | 2015 | Jakarta | (Malaysia) Lee Chong Wei | 14–21, 21–17, 8–21 |
| 33/64 | 2005 | Anaheim | (Vietnam) Nguyễn Tiến Minh | 13–15, 16–17 |
EBU/BE European Championships
| Gold | 2012 | Karlskrona | (Sweden) Henri Hurskainen | 21–15, 21–13 |
| Bronze | 2010 | Manchester | (Denmark) Peter Gade | 21–18, 12–21, 17–21 |
| Bronze | 2016 | La Roche-sur-Yon | (Denmark) Viktor Axelsen | 10–21, 21–23 |
| 17/32 | 2008 | Herning | (Germany) Dieter Domke | 15–21, 13–21 |
| 17/32 | 2014 | Kazan | (Russia) Vladimir Ivanov | 14–21, 22–24 |
| 33/64 | 2004 | Geneva | (Netherlands) Eric Pang | 12–15, 3–15 |
German National Championships (DBV)
| Gold | 2005 | Bielefeld | Björn Joppien | 15–6, 10–15, 15–13 |
| Gold | 2008 | Bielefeld | Björn Joppien | 21–19, 21–14 |
| Gold | 2009 | Bielefeld | Björn Joppien | 22–20, 22–20 |
| Gold | 2010 | Bielefeld | Dieter Domke | 21–11, 21–13 |
| Gold | 2011 | Bielefeld | Lukas Schmidt | 21–18, 21–12 |
| Gold | 2012 | Bielefeld | Dieter Domke | 21–12, 21–23, 21–15 |
| Gold | 2013 | Bielefeld | Lukas Schmidt | 21–18, 21–12 |
| Gold | 2015 | Bielefeld | Fabian Roth | 21–13, 23–21 |
| Bronze | 2003 | Bielefeld |
International tournaments
| 1 | 2003 | French Open | (Denmark) Joachim Fischer Nielsen | 15–3, 8–15, 15–12 |
| 3/4 | 2004 | Dutch Open | (Denmark) Kenneth Jonassen | 9–15, 7–15 |
| 2 | 2004 | Norwegian International | (Germany) Björn Joppien | 4–15, 5–15 |
| 3/4 | 2004 | Iceland International | (Canada) Bobby Milroy | 13–15, 15–2, 11–15 |
| 3/4 | 2004 | Le Volant d'Or de Toulouse | (Denmark) Kasper Ødum | 15–11, 2–15, 13–15 |
| 2 | 2004 | Scottish International | (India) Arvind Bhat | 8–15, 7–15 |
| 3/4 | 2005 | Portuguese International | (France) Arif Rasidi | 12–15, 0–15 |
| 3/4 | 2005 | Bitburger Open | (Denmark) Kasper Ødum | 15–13, 3–15, 4–15 |
| 1 | 2007 | Belgian International | (China) Wu Yunyong | 21–16, 14–21, 21–19 |
| 3/4 | 2007 | Bitburger Open | (Malaysia) Lee Tsuen Seng | 10–21, 23–21, 15–21 |
| 1 | 2007 | Norwegian International | (Denmark) Kasper Ødum | 21–15, 11–21, 23–21 |
| 1 | 2007 | Welsh International | (Wales) Irwansyah | 21–16, 21–13 |
| 2 | 2007 | Irish International | (Denmark) Peter Mikkelsen | 19–21, 18–21 |
| 1 | 2007 | Hellas International | (United States) Raju Rai | 21–14, 21–16 |
| 1 | 2008 | Swedish International Stockholm | (Denmark) Jan Ø. Jørgensen | 21–13, 23–21 |
| 1 | 2008 | Polish International | (Finland) Ville Lång | 21–15, 21–13 |
| 1 | 2008 | European Badminton Circuit Finals | (Finland) Ville Lång | 21–14, 19–21, 21–19 |
| 2 | 2009 | Finnish International | (Denmark) Peter Mikkelsen | 14–21, 21–16, 20–22 |
| 1 | 2009 | Belgian International | (Denmark) Christian Lind Thomsen | 21–13, 16–21, 21–15 |
| 2 | 2009 | Denmark Open | (Indonesia) Simon Santoso | 14–21, 6–21 |
| 2 | 2009 | Norwegian International | (Denmark) Hans-Kristian Vittinghus | 21–15, 18–21, 19–21 |
| 1 | 2009 | Scottish International | (Denmark) Peter Mikkelsen | 21–15, 15–21, 21–16 |
| 1 | 2010 | Belgian International | (Netherlands) Eric Pang | 21–15, 21–17 |
| 3/4 | 2011 | All England Open | Lin Dan | 9–21, 21–16, 11–21 |
| 3/4 | 2011 | Morocco International | (Denmark) Joachim Persson | 12–21, 15–21 |
| 3/4 | 2011 | U.S. Open | (Vietnam) Nguyễn Tiến Minh | 22–20, 13–21, 18–21 |
| 1 | 2011 | Canada Open | (Indonesia) Taufik Hidayat | 21–13, 25–23 |
| 3/4 | 2011 | Bitburger Open | (Denmark) Hans-Kristian Vittinghus | 21–17, 17–21, 16–21 |
| 2 | 2012 | Bitburger Open | (Chinese Taipei) Chou Tien-chen | 19–21, 12–21 |
| 2 | 2013 | Indonesia Open | (Malaysia) Lee Chong Wei | 15–21, 14–21 |
| 2 | 2013 | Bitburger Open | (Chinese Taipei) Chou Tien-Chen | 21–13, 18–21, 15–21 |
| 3/4 | 2014 | German Open | (Denmark) Hans-Kristian Vittinghus | 16–21, 13–21 |
| 2 | 2014 | Belgian International | (Denmark) Hans-Kristian Vittinghus | 8–11, 11–10, 9–11, 9–11 |
| 1 | 2014 | Czech International | (Denmark) Joachim Persson | 21–13, 21–18 |
| 1 | 2014 | Bulgarian International | (Republic of Ireland) Scott Evans | 21–15, 21–8 |
| 3/4 | 2014 | China Open | (India) Srikanth Kidambi | 11–21, 7–13 Retired |
| 3/4 | 2015 | Indonesia Open | (Denmark) Jan Ø. Jørgensen | 17–21, 5–11 Retired |
| 3/4 | 2015 | Canada Open | (Hong Kong) Ng Ka Long Angus | 17–21, 15–21 |
| 1 | 2015 | Prague Open | (Croatia) Zvonimir Đurkinjak | 26–24, 21–11 |
| 3/4 | 2015 | Bitburger Open | (Hong Kong) Wong Wing Ki | 21–18, 12–21, 11–21 |
| 2 | 2015 | Italian International | (France) Brice Leverdez | 17–21, 21–14, 24–26 |
| 1 | 2015 | Turkey International | (India) Harsheel Dani | 21–8, 15–21, 21–7 |
| 2 | 2016 | Swiss Open | (India) Prannoy H. S. | 18–21, 15–21 |

Legend
BWF World Superseries Finals
BWF World Superseries Premier
BWF World Superseries
BWF Grand Prix Gold
BWF Grand Prix (until 2006 IBF World Grand Prix)
BE Circuit Finals
BE Circuit / International Challenge

==== BWF Super Series (Premier) ====
| Season | 1 | 2 | 3 | 4 | 5 | 6 | 7 | 8 | 9 | 10 | 11 | 12 | SSF | Ranking |
|---|---|---|---|---|---|---|---|---|---|---|---|---|---|---|
| 2007 | (Malaysia) | (South Korea) | (England) | (Switzerland) | (Singapore) | (Indonesia) | (China) | (Japan) | (Denmark) | (France) | (China) | (Hong Kong) | (Qatar) | 83 |
| 2007 | – | – | – | – | – | – | – | – | – | Q | – | – | | 83 |
| 2008 | (Malaysia) | (South Korea) | (England) | (Switzerland) | (Singapore) | (Indonesia) | (Japan) | (China) | (Denmark) | (France) | (China) | (Hong Kong) | (Malaysia) | 44 |
| 2008 | – | – | – | Q | – | – | – | – | 1R | 1R | 1R | 2R | – | 44 |
| 2009 | (Malaysia) | (South Korea) | (England) | (Switzerland) | (Singapore) | (Indonesia) | (China) | (Japan) | (Denmark) | (France) | (Hong Kong) | (China) | (Malaysia) | 30 |
| 2009 | – | – | 2R | 1R | 1R | 1R | – | – | F | 1R | – | – | – | 30 |
| 2010 | (South Korea) | (Malaysia) | (England) | (Switzerland) | (Singapore) | (Indonesia) | (China) | (Japan) | (Denmark) | (France) | (China) | (Hong Kong) | (Chinese Taipei) | 13 |
| 2010 | 2R | 1R | 1R | 1R | 1R | 2R | – | – | QF | QF | 1R | 1R | – | 13 |
| 2011 | (Malaysia) | (South Korea) | (England) | (India) | (Singapore) | (Indonesia) | (China) | (Japan) | (Denmark) | (France) | (Hong Kong) | (China) | (China) | 13 |
| 2011 | 2R | 2R | SF | – | 2R | 1R | 1R | 1R | 2R | 1R | 2R | 1R | – | 13 |
| 2012 | (South Korea) | (Malaysia) | (England) | (India) | (Indonesia) | (Singapore) | (China) | (Japan) | (Denmark) | (France) | (China) | (Hong Kong) | (China) | 25 |
| 2012 | QF | 1R | 2R | – | – | – | – | – | 2R | 1R | 1R | QF | – | 25 |
| 2013 | (South Korea) | (Malaysia) | (England) | (India) | (Indonesia) | (Singapore) | (China) | (Japan) | (Denmark) | (France) | (China) | (Hong Kong) | (Malaysia) | 14 |
| 2013 | 2R | 1R | 1R | – | F | QF | – | 2R | 1R | 1R | 1R | 2R | – | 14 |
| 2014 | (South Korea) | (Malaysia) | (England) | (India) | (Singapore) | (Japan) | (Indonesia) | (Australia) | (Denmark) | (France) | (China) | (Hong Kong) | (United Arab Emirates) | 19 |
| 2014 | 2R | 1R | 1R | – | – | 2R | 1R | 2R | 1R | 2R | SF | 1R | – | 19 |
| 2015 | (England) | (India) | (Malaysia) | (Singapore) | (Australia) | (Indonesia) | (Japan) | (South Korea) | (Denmark) | (France) | (China) | (Hong Kong) | (United Arab Emirates) | 14 |
| 2015 | 2R | 1R | 1R | 1R | 1R | SF | 1R | 1R | - | - | 1R | 2R | | 14 |

=== Germany national team ===
| Outcome | Year | Venue | Last opponent | Score |
|---|---|---|---|---|
Thomas Cup
| 5/8 | 2010 | Kuala Lumpur | Japan (Kenichi Tago) | 1–3 (21–15, 18–21, 18–21) |
| 5/8 | 2012 | Wuhan | South Korea (Lee Hyun-il) | 0–3 (16–21, 21–18, 14–21) |
| 9/12 | 2008 | Jakarta | Japan (Shōji Satō) | 2–3 (21–19, 17–21, 5–21) |
| 13/16 | 2014 | New Delhi | India (Srikanth Kidambi) | 2–3 (18–21, 21–18, 18–21) |
Sudirman Cup
| 5/8 | 2015 | Dongguan | China (Lin Dan) | 0–3 (12–21, 15–21) |
| 9/12 | 2011 | Qingdao | Japan (Kenichi Tago) | 1–4 (11–21, 18–21) |
| 13 | 2007 | Glasgow | Netherlands (Eric Pang) | 3–0 (21–18, 19–21, 21–17) |
| 13 | 2009 | Guangzhou | Netherlands (Eric Pang) | 3–0 (21–19, 19–21, 21–14) |
European Mixed Team Championships (BE)
| Gold | 2013 | Ramenskoye | Denmark (Hans-Kristian Vittinghus) | 3–0 (21–17, 7–21, 21–8) |
| Silver | 2011 | Amsterdam | Denmark (Jan Ø. Jørgensen) | 1–3 (18–21, 15–21) |
| 5 | 2008 | Herning | Russia (without participation) | 3–2 |
| 5/8 | 2009 | Liverpool | Russia (Vladimir Malkov) | 2–3 (21–9, 21–13) |
European Men's Team Championships (BE)
| Silver | 2012 | Amsterdam | Denmark (Jan Ø. Jørgensen) | 0–3 (11–21, 14–21) |
| Bronze | 2008 | Almere | Poland (Łukasz Moreń) | 3–1 (21–12, 21–18) |
| Bronze | 2010 | Warsaw | Ukraine (Dmytro Zavadsky) | 3–1 (21–16, 27–25) |
| Bronze | 2014 | Basel | England (Rajiv Ouseph) | 1–3 (13–21, 21–17, 16–21) |
