= 2018 European Junior Badminton Championships – Boys' doubles =

2018 European Junior Badminton Championships – Boys' Doubles
Tournament details
- Dates: 11 – 16 September 2018
- Edition: 26
- Venue: Kalev Sports Hall
- Location: Tallinn, Estonia

The Boys' Doubles tournament of the 2018 European Junior Badminton Championships was held from September 11-16. French Doubles Thom Gicquel and Toma Junior Popov clinched this title in the last edition. Scottish Christopher Grimley / Matthew Grimley leads the seedings this year.

== Seeded ==
1. (Scotland) Christopher Grimley / Matthew Grimley (finals)
2. (France) Fabien Delrue / William Villeger (champions)
3. (Italy) Enrico Baroni / Giovanni Toti (third round)
4. (England) Rory Easton / Zach Russ (quarter-finals)
5. (Belgium) Julien Carraggi / Jona van Nieuwkerke (third round)
6. (Slovenia) Klemen Lesnicar / Domen Lonzaric (second round)
7. (Ukraine) Glib Beketov / Mykhaylo Makhnovskiy (third round)
8. (Spain) Joan Monroy / Carlos Piris (third round)

== Draw ==
=== Finals ===
Quarterfinals
1	(Scotland) Christopher Grimley (Scotland) Matthew Grimley	21	21
(England) William Jones (England) Ethan Van Leeuwen	15	8
(France) Maxime Briot (France) Kenji Lovang	21	24	21
(Germany) Matthias Kicklitz (Germany) Aaron Sonnenschein	12	26	8
(Denmark) Mads Muurholm (Denmark) Mads Vestergaard	20	21	21
4	(England) Rory Easton (England) Zach Russ	22	10	17
(Switzerland) Yann Orteu (Switzerland) Minh Quang Pham	11	17
2	(France) Fabien Delrue (France) William Villeger	21	21

Semifinals
1	(Scotland) Christopher Grimley (Scotland) Matthew Grimley	21	21
(France) Maxime Briot (France) Kenji Lovang	14	16
(Denmark) Mads Muurholm (Denmark) Mads Vestergaard	14	16
2	(France) Fabien Delrue (France) William Villeger	21	21

Final
1	(Scotland) Christopher Grimley (Scotland) Matthew Grimley	18	15
2	(France) Fabien Delrue (France) William Villeger	21	21

=== Top half ===
==== Section 1 ====
First round
(Finland) E Lauri (Finland) V Lindahl	21	21	21
(Poland) B Galazka (Poland) M Matusz	19	23	18
(Republic of Ireland) M Kinnerk (Republic of Ireland) B O'Mahony	16	21	12
(Croatia) L Ban (Croatia) J Meglic	21	17	21

Second round
1	(Scotland) C Grimley (Scotland) M Grimley	21	21
(Finland) E Lauri (Finland) V Lindahl	13	4
(Denmark) R Espersen (Denmark) S Gronbjerg	21	21
(Croatia) L Ban (Croatia) J Meglic	15	9

Third round
1	(Scotland) C Grimley (Scotland) M Grimley	12	21	21
(Denmark) R Espersen (Denmark) S Gronbjerg	21	15	14

==== Section 2 ====
First round
(Cyprus) C Hadjigeorgiou (Cyprus) A Kattirtzi	17	21	16
(Bulgaria) D Nenchev (Bulgaria) S Zlankov	21	18	21
(Russia) E Kholkin (Russia) G Lebedev	18	9
(England) W Jones (England) E Van Leeuwen	21	21
(Latvia) A D Bedritis (Latvia) R V Blaubergs	17	13
(Estonia) A Ajupov (Estonia) T Kilk	21	21

Second round
7	(Ukraine) G Beketov (Ukraine) M Makhnovskiy	21	21
(Bulgaria) D Nenchev (Bulgaria) S Zlankov	17	10
(England) W Jones (England) E Van Leeuwen	21	21
(Estonia) A Ajupov (Estonia) T Kilk	7	12

Third round
7	(Ukraine) G Beketov (Ukraine) M Makhnovskiy	14	15
(England) W Jones (England) E Van Leeuwen	21	21

==== Section 3 ====
First round
(Portugal) L Selvarajah (Portugal) R Tremoceiro	21	21
(Romania) H Cosmin (Romania) D Popescu	18	12
(France) M Briot (France) K Lovang	21	21
(Netherlands) W van der Aar (Netherlands) T van der Lecq	17	13
(Turkey) S B Basakin (Turkey) S Ugurlu	8	10
(Czech Republic) J Janostik (Czech Republic) T Svejda	21	21

Second round
3	(Italy) E Baroni (Italy) G Toti	23	21
(Portugal) L Selvarajah (Portugal) R Tremoceiro	21	16
(France) M Briot (France) K Lovang	21	21
(Czech Republic) J Janostik (Czech Republic) T Svejda	11	17

Third round
3	(Italy) E Baroni (Italy) G Toti	20	16
(France) M Briot (France) K Lovang	22	21

==== Section 4 ====
First round
(Sweden) J Hansson (Sweden) M Z-Bexell	21	21
(Slovakia) A Antoska (Slovakia) J Horak	16	11
(Germany) M Kicklitz (Germany) A Sonnenschein	21	21
(Norway) M Barth (Norway) T Ellingsen	12	17
(Israel) M Bar Netzer (Israel) M Grinblat	23	21
(Belarus) A Aliaksandrovich (Belarus) A Kniazeu	21	9

Second round
6	(Slovenia) K Lesnicar (Slovenia) D Lonzaric	11	14
(Sweden) J Hansson (Sweden) M Z-Bexell	21	21
(Germany) M Kicklitz (Germany) A Sonnenschein	21	21
(Israel) M Bar Netzer (Israel) M Grinblat	13	16

Third round
(Sweden) J Hansson (Sweden) M Z-Bexell	19	24	13
(Germany) M Kicklitz (Germany) A Sonnenschein	21	22	21

=== Bottom half ===
==== Section 5 ====
First round
(Norway) J Osthassel (Norway) L Smith-Meyer	18	14
(Turkey) S Kelebek (Turkey) F M Yilmaz	21	21
(Estonia) H-K Pilve (Estonia) A Raudsepp	16	18
(Denmark) M Muurholm (Denmark) M Vestergaard	21	21
(Russia) D Klimenko (Russia) V Shipilenko	21	21	15
(Ukraine) D Bosniuk (Ukraine) I Medynskiy	23	17	21

Second round
(Turkey) S Kelebek (Turkey) F M Yilmaz	16	12
(Denmark) M Muurholm (Denmark) M Vestergaard	21	21
(Ukraine) D Bosniuk (Ukraine) I Medynskiy	23	18
5	(Belgium) J Carraggi (Belgium) J van Nieuwkerke	25	21

Third round
(Denmark) M Muurholm (Denmark) M Vestergaard	19	21	21
5	(Belgium) J Carraggi (Belgium) J van Nieuwkerke	21	12	15

==== Section 6 ====
First round
(Scotland) J Apiliga (Scotland) A Pringle	21	21
(Croatia) L Grubic (Israel) R Mogilner	6	3
(Czech Republic) V Kulisek (Czech Republic) V Palan	13	17
(Netherlands) G Duijs (Netherlands) B Wassink	21	21
(Hungary) M Balint (Hungary) Z Dulcz	21	21
(Moldova) P Cunev (Iceland) B M Ellertsson	7	16

Second round
(Scotland) J Apiliga (Scotland) A Pringle	21	19	19
(Netherlands) G Duijs (Netherlands) B Wassink	18	21	21
(Hungary) M Balint (Hungary) Z Dulcz	9	13
4	(England) R Easton (England) Z Russ	21	21

Third round
(Netherlands) G Duijs (Netherlands) B Wassink	21	16	19
4	(England) R Easton (England) Z Russ	15	21	21

==== Section 7 ====
First round
(Iceland) E Hognason (Iceland) E Sverrisson	15	11
(Switzerland) Y Orteu (Switzerland) M Q Pham	21	21
(Italy) S Koellemann (Italy) M Massetti	21	21
(Austria) J Maczejka (Austria) S Ofner	14	16
(Portugal) J Chang (Portugal) T Coelho	21	15	9
(Finland) T Lindelof (Finland) J Oldorff	15	21	21

Second round
(Switzerland) Y Orteu (Switzerland) M Q Pham	26	21
(Italy) S Koellemann (Italy) M Massetti	24	18
(Finland) T Lindelof (Finland) J Oldorff	15	11
8	(Spain) J Monroy (Spain) C Piris	21	21

Third round
(Switzerland) Y Orteu (Switzerland) M Q Pham	21	21
8	(Spain) J Monroy (Spain) C Piris	14	19

==== Section 8 ====
First round
(Germany) L Adam (Germany) N Kirchgessner	21	13	22
(Poland) S Stokfisz (Poland) W Trecki	16	21	24
(Latvia) M Kirkums (Latvia) R R Miscenko	21	21
(Lithuania) D Berzanskis (Lithuania) L Borusas	9	13

Second round
(Poland) S Stokfisz (Poland) W Trecki	21	21
(Cyprus) S Hadjipantelis (Cyprus) O Pissis	7	10
(Latvia) M Kirkums (Latvia) R R Miscenko	9	13
2	(France) F Delrue (France) W Villeger	21	21

Third round
(Poland) S Stokfisz (Poland) W Trecki	13	14
2	(France) F Delrue (France) W Villeger	21	21
