= Matthew Grimley =

Scottish international badminton player

Personal information
- Nationality: British (Scottish)
- Born: 6 February 2000

Sport
- Sport: Badminton
- Club: Wipperfeld BC
- Coached by: Ingo Kindervater / Robert Blair
- BWF profile
Medal record
Representing Scotland
European Junior Championships
Silver medal – second place	2018 Tallinn	Boys' doubles

Matthew Grimley (born 6 February 2000) is an international badminton player from Scotland who competed at the Commonwealth Games.

== Biography ==
Grimley born in 2000, is from Glasgow and a member of the Wipperfeld Badminton Club. At the age of 6, he started playing doubles with his twin brother Christopher Grimley.

The brothers were selected for the 2022 Commonwealth Games in Birmingham, England and he subsequently represented the Scottish team participating in the badminton events.

He is a three-times men's doubles champion (2021, 2024, 2025) and once mixed doubles champion (2021) at the Scottish National Badminton Championships.

Additionally, he was won titles at the Scottish Open and Irish Open.

== Achievements ==
=== European Junior Championships ===
Boys' doubles
Year	Venue	Partner	Opponent	Score	Result
2018	Kalev Sports Hall; Tallinn, Estonia	(Scotland) Christopher Grimley	(France) Fabien Delrue (France) William Villeger	18–21, 15–21	Silver

=== BWF International Challenge/Series (5 titles, 4 runners-up) ===
Men's doubles
Year	Tournament	Partner	Opponent	Score	Result
2019	Portugal International	(Scotland) Christopher Grimley	(Chinese Taipei) Chang Ko-chi (Chinese Taipei) Lee Fang-jen	21–16, 16–21, 13–21	(silver) Runner-up
2020	Portugal International	(Scotland) Christopher Grimley	(France) Lucas Corvée (France) Brice Leverdez	24–26, 22–24	(silver) Runner-up
2021	Scottish Open	(Scotland) Christopher Grimley	(Malaysia) Junaidi Arif (Malaysia) Muhammad Haikal	22–20, 21–16	(gold) Winner
2023	Irish Open	(Scotland) Christopher Grimley	(Denmark) Andreas Søndergaard (Denmark) Jesper Toft	22–20, 16–21, 21–17	(gold) Winner
2023	Welsh International	(Scotland) Christopher Grimley	(Germany) Bjarne Geiss (Germany) Jan Colin Völker	18–21, 21–16, 21–17	(gold) Winner
2024	Irish Open	(Scotland) Christopher Grimley	(Denmark) William Kryger Boe (Denmark) Christian Faust Kjær	15–21, 8–21	(silver) Runner-up
2026	Azerbaijan International	(Scotland) Christopher Grimley	(England) Alex Green (England) Zach Russ	19–21, 17–21	(silver) Runner-up
2026	Belgian International	(Scotland) Christopher Grimley	(Denmark) Robert Nebel (Denmark) Jeppe Søby	21–18, 21–12	(gold) Winner
2026	Dutch Open	(Scotland) Christopher Grimley	(Denmark) Kristoffer Kolding (Denmark) Calvin Lundsgaard	21–13, 21–10	(gold) Winner

BWF International Challenge tournament
BWF International Series tournament
BWF Future Series tournament

=== BWF Junior International (6 titles, 6 runners-up) ===
Boys' singles
Year	Tournament	Opponent	Score	Result
2016	Estonian Junior International	(Scotland) Christopher Grimley	7–11, 11–7, 11–9, 8–11, 5–11	(silver) Runner-up

Boys' doubles
Year	Tournament	Partner	Opponent	Score	Result
2015	Irish Junior Open	(Scotland) Christopher Grimley	(France) Louis Ducrot (Republic of Ireland) Sam McKay	14–21, 15–21	(silver) Runner-up
2016	Czech Junior International	(Scotland) Christopher Grimley	(Poland) Robert Cybulski (Poland) Paweł Śmiłowski	17–21, 18–21	(silver) Runner-up
2016	Estonian Junior International	(Scotland) Christopher Grimley	(Sweden) Adam Gozzi (Sweden) Carl Harrbacka	11–2, 9–11, 11–5, 11–6	(gold) Winner
2017	Irish Junior Open	(Scotland) Christopher Grimley	(Republic of Ireland) Nhat Nguyen (Republic of Ireland) Paul Reynolds	12–21, 11–21	(silver) Runner-up
2017	Czech Junior International	(Scotland) Christopher Grimley	(England) Zach Russ (England) Steven Stallwood	13–21, 13–21	(silver) Runner-up
2017	Estonian Junior International	(Scotland) Christopher Grimley	(Russia) Georgii Karpov (Russia) Mikhail Lavrikov	11–6, 11–9, 11–8	(gold) Winner
2018	Swedish Junior International	(Scotland) Christopher Grimley	(Spain) Joan Monroy (Spain) Carlos Piris	21–5, 21–19	(gold) Winner
2018	Hungarian Junior International	(Scotland) Christopher Grimley	(Scotland) Joshua Apiliga (Scotland) Adam Pringle	19–21, 22–20, 21–17	(gold) Winner
2018	Bulgarian Junior International	(Scotland) Christopher Grimley	(Russia) Georgii Karpov (Russia) Georgii Lebedev	21–12, 21–11	(gold) Winner
2018	Lithuanian Junior International	(Scotland) Christopher Grimley	(Germany) Brian Holtschke (Germany) Lukas Resch	21–12, 21–14	(gold) Winner

Mixed doubles
Year	Tournament	Partner	Opponent	Score	Result
2016	Czech Junior International	(Scotland) Toni Woods	(Scotland) Christopher Grimley (Scotland) Ciara Torrance	19–21, 17–21	(silver) Runner-up

BWF Junior International Grand Prix tournament
BWF Junior International Challenge tournament
BWF Junior International Series tournament
BWF Junior Future Series tournament
