= Christopher Grimley =

Scottish badminton player

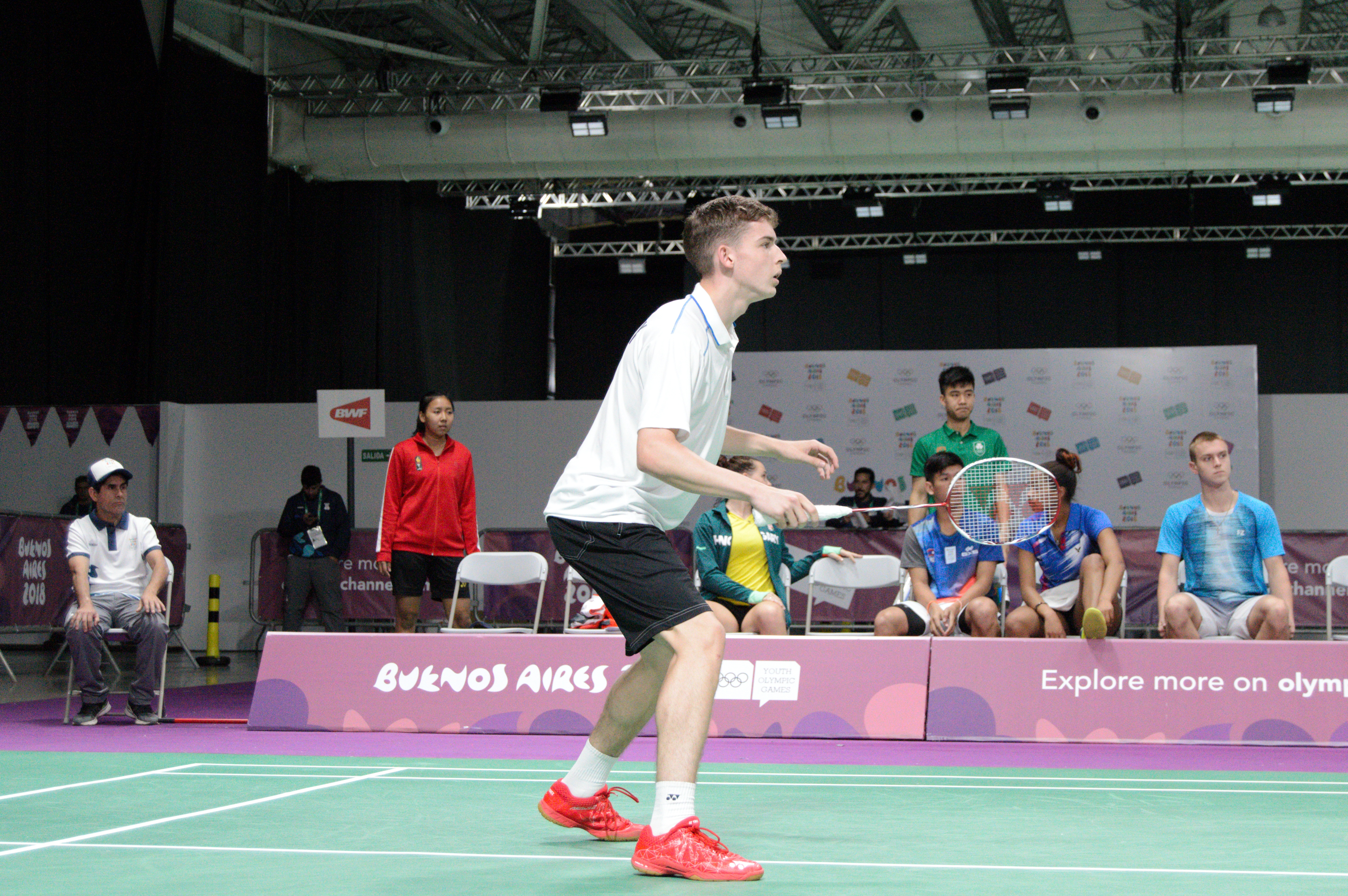
- Grimley at the 2018 Summer Youth Olympycs

Personal information
- Born: 6 February 2000 (age 26) Glasgow, Scotland
- Years active: 2015–present
- Height: 1.77 m (5 ft 10 in)

Sport
- Country: Scotland
- Sport: Badminton
- Handedness: Right

Men's & mixed doubles
- Highest ranking: 32 (MD with Matthew Grimley, 29 September 2026); 67 (XD with Eleanor O'Donnell, 18 October 2022)
- Current ranking: 35 (MD with Matthew Grimley, 27 October 2026)
- BWF profile
Medal record
Men's badminton
Representing Scotland
European Junior Championships
Silver medal – second place	2018 Tallinn	Boys' doubles

Christopher Grimley (born 6 February 2000) is a Scottish badminton player who competes in international level events. His doubles partner is his twin brother Matthew Grimley. Christopher has competed at the 2018 Summer Youth Olympics.

== Career ==
=== Early career ===
Christopher Grimley started to know about badminton at the age of six because his parents playing this sport. He used to attend Lourdes Primary School before he got the chance to move to the Glasgow School of Sport, based at Bellahouston Academy. The twins have already won a host of titles and are the Scottish National U–13 doubles champions in 2012. They also hold the doubles titles for Glasgow, the West of Scotland and the East of Scotland. Christopher also won the Glasgow U–13 singles title.

=== 2017–2018 ===
In 2017, Christopher and Matthew reached the round of 16 at the 2017 BWF World Junior Championships. The twins then won the silver medal at the 2018 European Junior Championships.

=== 2019–2020 ===
In 2019, Christopher and Matthew were at least in the final four in six tournaments, and finished as runner-up at the Portugal International tournament.

In March 2020, the twins ranked as number 60 in BWF World ranking.

== Achievements ==
=== European Junior Championships ===
Boys' doubles
Year	Venue	Partner	Opponent	Score	Result
2018	Kalev Sports Hall; Tallinn, Estonia	(Scotland) Matthew Grimley	(France) Fabien Delrue (France) William Villeger	18–21, 15–21	Silver

=== BWF International Challenge/Series (6 titles, 4 runners-up) ===
Men's doubles
Year	Tournament	Partner	Opponent	Score	Result
2019	Portugal International	(Scotland) Matthew Grimley	(Chinese Taipei) Chang Ko-chi (Chinese Taipei) Lee Fang-jen	21–16, 16–21, 13–21	(silver) Runner-up
2020	Portugal International	(Scotland) Matthew Grimley	(France) Lucas Corvée (France) Brice Leverdez	24–26, 22–24	(silver) Runner-up
2021	Scottish Open	(Scotland) Matthew Grimley	(Malaysia) Junaidi Arif (Malaysia) Muhammad Haikal	22–20, 21–16	(gold) Winner
2023	Irish Open	(Scotland) Matthew Grimley	(Denmark) Andreas Søndergaard (Denmark) Jesper Toft	22–20, 16–21, 21–17	(gold) Winner
2023	Welsh International	(Scotland) Matthew Grimley	(Germany) Bjarne Geiss (Germany) Jan Colin Völker	18–21, 21–16, 21–17	(gold) Winner
2024	Irish Open	(Scotland) Matthew Grimley	(Denmark) William Kryger Boe (Denmark) Christian Faust Kjær	15–21, 8–21	(silver) Runner-up
2026	Azerbaijan International	(Scotland) Matthew Grimley	(England) Alex Green (England) Zach Russ	19–21, 17–21	(silver) Runner-up
2026	Belgian International	(Scotland) Matthew Grimley	(Denmark) Robert Nebel (Denmark) Jeppe Søby	21–18, 21–12	(gold) Winner
2026	Dutch Open	(Scotland) Matthew Grimley	(Denmark) Kristoffer Kolding (Denmark) Calvin Lundsgaard	21–13, 21–10	(gold) Winner

Mixed doubles
Year	Tournament	Partner	Opponent	Score	Result
2020	Portugal International	(Scotland) Eleanor O'Donnell	(Scotland) Adam Pringle (Scotland) Rachel Andrew	21–18, 21–6	(gold) Winner

BWF International Challenge tournament
BWF International Series tournament
BWF Future Series tournament

=== BWF Junior International (11 titles, 6 runners-up) ===
Boys' singles
Year	Tournament	Opponent	Score	Result
2016	Estonian Junior International	(Scotland) Matthew Grimley	11–7, 7–11, 9–11, 11–8, 11–5	(gold) Winner
2018	Swedish Junior International	(Germany) Lukas Resch	21–19, 19–21, 21–17	(gold) Winner
2018	Hellas Junior International	(England) Zach Russ	23–21, 22–20	(gold) Winner
2018	Cyprus Junior International	(Vietnam) Nguyễn Hải Đăng	14–21, 16–21	(silver) Runner-up
2018	Lithuanian Junior International	(Germany) Lukas Resch	21–19, 21–11	(gold) Winner

Boys' doubles
Year	Tournament	Partner	Opponent	Score	Result
2015	Irish Junior Open	(Scotland) Matthew Grimley	(France) Louis Ducrot (Republic of Ireland) Sam McKay	14–21, 15–21	(silver) Runner-up
2016	Czech Junior International	(Scotland) Matthew Grimley	(Poland) Robert Cybulski (Poland) Paweł Śmiłowski	17–21, 18–21	(silver) Runner-up
2016	Estonian Junior International	(Scotland) Matthew Grimley	(Sweden) Adam Gozzi (Sweden) Carl Harrbacka	11–2, 9–11, 11–5, 11–6	(gold) Winner
2017	Irish Junior Open	(Scotland) Matthew Grimley	(Republic of Ireland) Nhat Nguyen (Republic of Ireland) Paul Reynolds	12–21, 11–21	(silver) Runner-up
2017	Czech Junior International	(Scotland) Matthew Grimley	(England) Zach Russ (England) Steven Stallwood	13–21, 13–21	(silver) Runner-up
2017	Estonian Junior International	(Scotland) Matthew Grimley	(Russia) Georgii Karpov (Russia) Mikhail Lavrikov	11–6, 11–9, 11–8	(gold) Winner
2018	Swedish Junior International	(Scotland) Matthew Grimley	(Spain) Joan Monroy (Spain) Carlos Piris	21–5, 21–19	(gold) Winner
2018	Hungarian Junior International	(Scotland) Matthew Grimley	(Scotland) Joshua Apiliga (Scotland) Adam Pringle	19–21, 22–20, 21–17	(gold) Winner
2018	Bulgarian Junior International	(Scotland) Matthew Grimley	(Russia) Georgii Karpov (Russia) Georgii Lebedev	21–12, 21–11	(gold) Winner
2018	Lithuanian Junior International	(Scotland) Matthew Grimley	(Germany) Brian Holtschke (Germany) Lukas Resch	21–12, 21–14	(gold) Winner

Mixed doubles
Year	Tournament	Partner	Opponent	Score	Result
2016	Danish Junior Cup	(Scotland) Ciara Torrance	(Denmark) Rasmus Kjær (Denmark) Irina Amalie Andersen	21–11, 7–21, 23–25	(silver) Runner-up
2016	Czech Junior International	(Scotland) Ciara Torrance	(Scotland) Matthew Grimley (Scotland) Toni Woods	21–19, 21–17	(gold) Winner

BWF Junior International Grand Prix tournament
BWF Junior International Challenge tournament
BWF Junior International Series tournament
BWF Junior Future Series tournament
