= Kevin Jolly =

English badminton player

Sport
- Country: England
- Sport: Badminton
Medal record
Men's badminton
Representing England
World Cup
Bronze medal – third place	1979 Tokyo	Men's singles
Commonwealth Games
Gold medal – first place	1978 Edmonton	Mixed team
European Junior Championships
Gold medal – first place	1977 Ta' Qali	Mixed team
Silver medal – second place	1977 Ta' Qali	Boys' singles
Silver medal – second place	1975 Copenhagen	Boys' doubles
Silver medal – second place	1977 Ta' Qali	Boys' doubles
Silver medal – second place	1977 Ta' Qali	Mixed doubles
Silver medal – second place	1975 Copenhagen	Mixed team
Bronze medal – third place	1975 Copenhagen	Boys' singles

Kevin Jolly is a retired male badminton player from England.

== Career ==
He represented England and won a gold medal in the team event, at the 1978 Commonwealth Games in Edmonton, Alberta, Canada. In addition he competed in the singles, doubles and mixed doubles.

== Achievements ==
=== IBF World Grand Prix ===
The World Badminton Grand Prix sanctioned by International Badminton Federation (IBF) from 1983 to 2006.

Men's singles
Year	Tournament	Opponent	Score	Result
1984	Scottish Open	(Denmark) Morten Frost	11–15, 2–15	(silver) Runner-up
