= Linda Andrews (badminton) =

Northern Irish international badminton player

Personal information
- Nationality: British (Northern Irish)
- Born: c.1956

Sport
- Sport: Badminton
- Club: Alpha BC, Lisburn
Medal record
Representing Northern Ireland
European Junior Championships
Bronze medal – third place	1975	mixed doubles

Linda Andrews (born c.1956), is a former international badminton player from Northern Ireland who competed at the Commonwealth Games and won a bronze medal at the European Junior Championships.

== Biography ==
Andrews was a member of the Alpha Badminton Club in Lisburn and teamed up in the mixed doubles with Trevor Woods to win a bronze medal at the 1975 European Junior Badminton Championships.

She represented Ulster at provincial level and the all-Ireland team at international level. Andrews specialised in doubles play and partners included Ann Crossan.

Andrews represented the Northern Irish team at the 1982 Commonwealth Games in Brisbane, Australia, where she competed in three events.

In later life, Andrews took up pickleball and represented Ireland again 50 years after her first Irish badminton cap when she participated in the 2024 European Pickleball Championships.
