= 1986 Uber Cup group stage =

Badminton team tournament in Jakarta

The 1986 Uber Cup group stage was held at Istora Senayan in Jakarta, Indonesia, from 22 to 27 April 1986.

The group stage was first stage of the tournament where only the two highest-placing teams in each of the two groups advanced to the knockout stage.

== Draw ==
The original draw for the tournament was conducted on 15 March 1986. The 8 teams will be drawn into two groups each containing four teams.

=== Group composition ===
Group
Group A	Group B
China; Denmark; Japan; Sweden	Canada; England; Indonesia (Host); South Korea

== Group A ==
Pos	Team	Pld	W	L	GF	GA	GD	PF	PA	PD	Pts	Qualification
1	China	3	3	0	30	1	+29	385	167	+218	3	Advance to semi-finals
2	Japan	3	2	1	17	14	+3	290	248	+42	2	Advance to semi-finals
3	Denmark	3	1	2	10	20	−10	238	317	−79	1	
4	Sweden	3	0	3	4	26	−22	180	361	−181	0	

Source: The Straits Times

=== Japan vs Sweden ===
Japan
5
Istora Senayan
22 April 1986, 19:30 UTC+7

Sweden
0

			1	2	3
1	(Japan) (Sweden)	Sumiko Kitada; Christine Magnusson	11; 4	11; 4
2	(Japan) (Sweden)	Kimiko Jinnai; Catharina Andersson	11; 4	11; 1
3	(Japan) (Sweden)	Yoshiko Yonekura; Maria Henning	11; 1	11; 0
4	(Japan) (Sweden)	Sumiko Kitada / Harumi Kohara; Maria Bengtsson / Christine Magnusson	15; 10	15; 4
5	(Japan) (Sweden)	Kimiko Jinnai / Hisako Takamine; Anette Börjesson / Ann Sandersson	15; 5	15; 11

=== China vs Denmark ===
China
5
Istora Senayan
23 April 1986, 19:30 UTC+7

Denmark
0

			1	2	3
1	(China) (Denmark)	Li Lingwei; Kirsten Larsen	12; 10	11; 3
2	(China) (Denmark)	Han Aiping; Christina Bostofte	11; 4	11; 1
3	(China) (Denmark)	Wu Jianqiu; Charlotte Hattens	11; 3	11; 1
4	(China) (Denmark)	Lin Ying / Wu Dixi; Dorte Kjær / Nettie Nielsen	15; 13	15; 7
5	(China) (Denmark)	Guan Weizhen / Lao Yujing; Grete Mogensen / Gitte Paulsen	15; 9	15; 6

=== Denmark vs Japan ===
Denmark
2
Istora Senayan
24 April 1986, 19:30 UTC+7

Japan
3

			1	2	3
1	(Denmark) (Japan)	Kirsten Larsen; Sumiko Kitada	3; 11	7; 11
2	(Denmark) (Japan)	Christina Bostofte; Kimiko Jinnai	2; 11	0; 11
3	(Denmark) (Japan)	Charlotte Hattens; Yoshiko Yonekura	11; 6	11; 5
4	(Denmark) (Japan)	Dorte Kjær / Nettie Nielsen; Sumiko Kitada / Harumi Kohara	18; 14	15; 3
5	(Denmark) (Japan)	Grete Mogensen / Gitte Paulsen; Kimiko Jinnai / Hisako Takamine	2; 15	3; 15

=== China vs Sweden ===
China
5
Istora Senayan
25 April 1986, 19:30 UTC+7

Sweden
0

			1	2	3
1	(China) (Sweden)	Han Aiping; Christine Magnusson	11; 5	11; 3
2	(China) (Sweden)	Zheng Yuli; Maria Henning	11; 1	11; 1
3	(China) (Sweden)	Guan Weizhen; Ann Sandersson	11; 6	11; 1
4	(China) (Sweden)	Lin Ying / Wu Dixi; Maria Bengtsson / Anette Börjesson	15; 7	15; 7
5	(China) (Sweden)	Guan Weizhen / Lao Yujing; Catharina Andersson / Lilian Johansson	15; 8	15; 9

=== Denmark vs Sweden ===
Denmark
3
Istora Senayan
26 April 1986, 19:30 UTC+7

Sweden
2

			1	2	3
1	(Denmark) (Sweden)	Kirsten Larsen; Christine Magnusson	10; 12	9; 11
2	(Denmark) (Sweden)	Christina Bostofte; Catharina Andersson	11; 4	11; 0
3	(Denmark) (Sweden)	Lisbet Stuer-Lauridsen; Ann Sandersson	11; 7	11; 0
4	(Denmark) (Sweden)	Dorte Kjær / Nettie Nielsen; Maria Bengtsson / Christine Magnusson	5; 15	8; 15
5	(Denmark) (Sweden)	Grete Mogensen / Gitte Paulsen; Anette Börjesson / Ann Sandersson	18; 16	15; 8

=== China vs Japan ===
China
5
Istora Senayan
27 April 1986, 19:30 UTC+7

Japan
0

			1	2	3
1	(China) (Japan)	Li Lingwei; Sumiko Kitada	11; 7	11; 7
2	(China) (Japan)	Han Aiping; Kimiko Jinnai	12; 9	11; 2
3	(China) (Japan)	Zheng Yuli; Yoshiko Yonekura	11; 1	5; 11	11; 2
4	(China) (Japan)	Guan Weizhen / Lao Yujing; Sumiko Kitada / Harumi Kohara	15; 11	15; 0
5	(China) (Japan)	Wu Dixi / Wu Jianqiu; Kimiko Jinnai / Hisako Takamine	15; 8	15; 4

== Group B ==
Pos	Team	Pld	W	L	GF	GA	GD	PF	PA	PD	Pts	Qualification
1	Indonesia	3	3	0	25	6	+19	359	249	+110	3	Advance to semi-finals
2	South Korea	3	2	1	24	11	+13	373	264	+109	2	Advance to semi-finals
3	England	3	1	2	12	22	−10	307	377	−70	1	
4	Canada	3	0	3	7	29	−22	285	434	−149	0	

Source: The Straits Times

=== Indonesia vs Canada ===
Indonesia
5
Istora Senayan
22 April 1986, 19:30 UTC+7

Canada
0

			1	2	3
1	(Indonesia) (Canada)	Ivana Lie; Claire Sharpe	11; 6	11; 3
2	(Indonesia) (Canada)	Elizabeth Latief; Denyse Julien	11; 7	4; 11	11; 9
3	(Indonesia) (Canada)	Sarwendah Kusumawardhani; Linda Cloutier	11; 1	11; 4
4	(Indonesia) (Canada)	Imelda Kurniawan / Rosiana Tendean; Johanne Falardeau / Denyse Julien	15; 11	17; 14
5	(Indonesia) (Canada)	Verawaty Fadjrin / Yanti Kusmiati; Claire Sharpe / Sandra Skillings	15; 4	15; 9

=== South Korea vs Canada ===
South Korea
5
Istora Senayan
23 April 1986, 19:30 UTC+7

Canada
0

			1	2	3
1	(South Korea) (Canada)	Kim Yun-ja; Claire Sharpe	11; 2	11; 3
2	(South Korea) (Canada)	Yoo Sang-hee; Denyse Julien	11; 2	11; 2
3	(South Korea) (Canada)	Kim Ho-ja; Linda Cloutier	11; 5	12; 10
4	(South Korea) (Canada)	Chung Myung-hee / Hwang Hye-young; Johanne Falardeau / Denyse Julien	15; 4	6; 15	15; 3
5	(South Korea) (Canada)	Chung So-young / Kang Haeng-suk; Linda Cloutier / Claire Sharpe	14; 17	15; 7	15; 11

=== England vs Indonesia ===
England
0
Istora Senayan
24 April 1986, 19:30 UTC+7

Indonesia
5

			1	2	3
1	(England) (Indonesia)	Helen Troke; Ivana Lie	7; 11	8; 11
2	(England) (Indonesia)	Fiona Elliott; Sarwendah Kusumawardhani	8; 11	3; 11
3	(England) (Indonesia)	Wendy Massam; Verawaty Fadjrin	2; 11	2; 11
4	(England) (Indonesia)	Karen Beckman / Sara Halsall; Imelda Kurniawan / Rosiana Tendean	6; 15	15; 18
5	(England) (Indonesia)	Gillian Clark / Gillian Gowers; Verawaty Fadjrin / Ivana Lie	9; 15	13; 9		retired

=== England vs Canada ===
England
4
Istora Senayan
25 April 1986, 19:30 UTC+7

Canada
1

			1	2	3
1	(England) (Canada)	Helen Troke; Claire Sharpe	7; 11	11; 5	11; 0
2	(England) (Canada)	Fiona Elliott; Denyse Julien	11; 9	11; 4
3	(England) (Canada)	Gillian Gowers; Linda Cloutier	11; 8	11; 8
4	(England) (Canada)	Gillian Gowers / Helen Troke; Johanne Falardeau / Denyse Julien	15; 12	17; 18	9; 15
5	(England) (Canada)	Karen Beckman / Sara Halsall; Linda Cloutier / Claire Sharpe	15; 9	11; 15	15; 11

=== South Korea vs Indonesia ===
South Korea
2
Istora Senayan
26 April 1986, 19:30 UTC+7

Indonesia
3

			1	2	3
1	(South Korea) (Indonesia)	Kim Yun-ja; Ivana Lie	11; 4	11; 5
2	(South Korea) (Indonesia)	Hwang Hye-young; Elizabeth Latief	9; 12	11; 7	5; 11
3	(South Korea) (Indonesia)	Yoo Sang-hee; Sarwendah Kusumawardhani	11; 4	11; 1
4	(South Korea) (Indonesia)	Hwang Sun-ai / Kim Yun-ja; Imelda Kurniawan / Rosiana Tendean	8; 15	3; 15
5	(South Korea) (Indonesia)	Chung Myung-hee / Chung So-young; Verawaty Fadjrin / Yanti Kusmiati	5; 15	12; 15

=== England vs South Korea ===
England
1
Istora Senayan
27 April 1986, 19:30 UTC+7

South Korea
4

			1	2	3
1	(England) (South Korea)	Helen Troke; Kim Yun-ja	6; 11	11; 5	11; 4
2	(England) (South Korea)	Fiona Elliott; Yoo Sang-hee	6; 11	1; 11
3	(England) (South Korea)	Gillian Gowers; Chung So-young	5; 11	11; 2	2; 11
4	(England) (South Korea)	Karen Beckman / Sara Halsall; Chung Myung-hee / Hwang Hye-young	14; 18	4; 15
5	(England) (South Korea)	Gillian Gowers / Helen Troke; Kim Yun-ja / Yoo Sang-hee	3; 15	5; 15
