= 1986 Thomas & Uber Cup =

Biennial international badminton team championship

1986 Thomas & Uber Cup Piala Thomas dan Uber 1986
Tournament details
- Dates: 22 April – 4 May 1986
- Edition: 14th (Thomas Cup); 11th (Uber Cup)
- Level: International
- Nations: 8 (Thomas Cup); 8 (Uber Cup)
- Venue: Istora Senayan
- Location: Jakarta, Indonesia
- Official website: bwfthomasubercups.com

The 1986 Thomas Cup & Uber Cup was the 14th tournament of Thomas Cup and the 11th tournament of Uber Cup, the most important badminton team competitions in the world. The tournament took place in Jakarta, Indonesia from 22 April to 4 May 1986. China won its second title in the Thomas Cup and in the Uber Cup, both after beating Indonesia in the final round.

== Host selection ==
On 27 May 1984, Indonesia was named as the host of the 1986 Thomas and Uber Cup by the IBF. The Istora Senayan Indoor Stadium in Jakarta was chosen as the venue to host the tournament.

== Qualification ==
Indonesia qualified automatically for both the Thomas Cup and the Uber Cup as hosts. China qualified for the Uber Cup as trophy holders.

=== Thomas Cup ===
Means of qualification	Date	Venue	Slot	Qualified teams
Host country	27 May 1984	Jakarta	1	Indonesia
Asian Zone	17 – 23 February 1986	Bangkok	3	China
Asian Zone	17 – 23 February 1986	Bangkok	3	Malaysia
Asian Zone	17 – 23 February 1986	Bangkok	3	Singapore
European Zone	19 – 23 February 1986	Mülheim	3	Denmark
European Zone	19 – 23 February 1986	Mülheim	3	England
European Zone	19 – 23 February 1986	Mülheim	3	Sweden
Pan American Zone	19 – 22 February 1986	Vancouver	1	South Korea
Total			8	

=== Uber Cup ===
Means of qualification	Date	Venue	Slot	Qualified teams
Host country	27 May 1984	Jakarta	1	Indonesia
1984 Uber Cup	7 – 17 May 1984	Kuala Lumpur	1	China
Asian Zone	17 – 23 February 1986	Bangkok	2	Japan
Asian Zone	17 – 23 February 1986	Bangkok	2	South Korea
European Zone	19 – 23 February 1986	Mülheim	3	Denmark
European Zone	19 – 23 February 1986	Mülheim	3	England
European Zone	19 – 23 February 1986	Mülheim	3	Sweden
Pan American Zone	19 – 22 February 1986	Vancouver	1	Canada
Total			8	

== Medal summary ==
=== Medalists ===
Event	Gold	Silver	Bronze
Thomas Cup	China	Indonesia	Malaysia
Uber Cup	China	Indonesia	South Korea

=== Medal table ===
* Host nation (Indonesia)

Rank	Nation	Gold	Silver	Bronze	Total
1	China	2	0	0	2
2	Indonesia*	0	2	0	2
3	Malaysia	0	0	1	1
3	South Korea	0	0	1	1
Totals (4 entries)		2	2	2	6

== Thomas Cup ==
=== Group stage ===
==== Group A ====
Pos	Team	Pld	W	L	GF	GA	GD	PF	PA	PD	Pts	Qualification
1	Indonesia	3	3	0	28	7	+21	482	329	+153	3	Advance to semi-finals
2	Denmark	3	2	1	17	15	+2	397	352	+45	2	Advance to semi-finals
3	South Korea	3	1	2	18	16	+2	408	410	−2	1	
4	Sweden	3	0	3	3	28	−25	256	452	−196	0	

Source: The Straits Times

22 April 1986
19:30 UTC+7

South Korea	5–0	Sweden
Report

Istora Senayan, Jakarta

23 April 1986
19:30 UTC+7

Indonesia	5–0	Sweden
Report

Istora Senayan, Jakarta

24 April 1986
19:30 UTC+7

South Korea	2–3	Denmark
Report

Istora Senayan, Jakarta

25 April 1986
19:30 UTC+7

Indonesia	4–1	South Korea
Report

Istora Senayan, Jakarta

26 April 1986
19:30 UTC+7

Denmark	4–1	Sweden
Report

Istora Senayan, Jakarta

27 April 1986
19:30 UTC+7

Indonesia	3–2	Denmark
Report

Istora Senayan, Jakarta

==== Group B ====
Pos	Team	Pld	W	L	GF	GA	GD	PF	PA	PD	Pts	Qualification
1	China	3	3	0	29	2	+27	456	220	+236	3	Advance to semi-finals
2	Malaysia	3	2	1	21	11	+10	410	324	+86	2	Advance to semi-finals
3	England	3	1	2	12	21	−9	345	415	−70	1	
4	Singapore	3	0	3	2	30	−28	228	480	−252	0	

Source: The Straits Times

22 April 1986
19:30 UTC+7

China	5–0	Singapore
Report

Istora Senayan, Jakarta

23 April 1986
19:30 UTC+7

England	1–4	Malaysia
Report

Istora Senayan, Jakarta

24 April 1986
19:30 UTC+7

China	5–0	England
Report

Istora Senayan, Jakarta

25 April 1986
19:30 UTC+7

Malaysia	5–0	Singapore
Report

Istora Senayan, Jakarta

26 April 1986
19:30 UTC+7

China	4–1	Malaysia
Report

Istora Senayan, Jakarta

27 April 1986
19:30 UTC+7

England	5–0	Singapore
Report

Istora Senayan, Jakarta

=== Knockout stage ===
==== Bracket ====
Semi-finals
Indonesia	4
Malaysia	1
Denmark	1
China	4

Final
Indonesia	2
China	3
Third place
Malaysia	3
Denmark	2

==== Semi-finals ====
29 April 1986
19:30 UTC+7

China	4–1	Denmark
Report

Istora Senayan, Jakarta

30 April 1986
19:30 UTC+7

Indonesia	4–1	Malaysia
Report

Istora Senayan, Jakarta

==== Third place ====
2 May 1986
19:30 UTC+7

Denmark	2–3	Malaysia
Report

Istora Senayan, Jakarta

==== Final ====
4 May 1986
19:30 UTC+7

Indonesia	2–3	China
Report

Istora Senayan, Jakarta

1986 Thomas Cup winner

China
Second title

== Uber Cup ==
=== Group stage ===
==== Group A ====
Pos	Team	Pld	W	L	GF	GA	GD	PF	PA	PD	Pts	Qualification
1	China	3	3	0	30	1	+29	385	167	+218	3	Advance to semi-finals
2	Japan	3	2	1	17	14	+3	290	248	+42	2	Advance to semi-finals
3	Denmark	3	1	2	10	20	−10	238	317	−79	1	
4	Sweden	3	0	3	4	26	−22	180	361	−181	0	

Source: The Straits Times

22 April 1986
19:30 UTC+7

Japan	5–0	Sweden
Report

Istora Senayan, Jakarta

23 April 1986
19:30 UTC+7

China	5–0	Denmark
Report

Istora Senayan, Jakarta

24 April 1986
19:30 UTC+7

Denmark	2–3	Japan
Report

Istora Senayan, Jakarta

25 April 1986
19:30 UTC+7

China	5–0	Sweden
Report

Istora Senayan, Jakarta

26 April 1986
19:30 UTC+7

Denmark	3–2	Sweden
Report

Istora Senayan, Jakarta

27 April 1986
19:30 UTC+7

China	5–0	Japan
Report

Istora Senayan, Jakarta

==== Group B ====
Pos	Team	Pld	W	L	GF	GA	GD	PF	PA	PD	Pts	Qualification
1	Indonesia	3	3	0	25	6	+19	359	249	+110	3	Advance to semi-finals
2	South Korea	3	2	1	24	11	+13	373	264	+109	2	Advance to semi-finals
3	England	3	1	2	12	22	−10	307	377	−70	1	
4	Canada	3	0	3	7	29	−22	285	434	−149	0	

Source: The Straits Times

22 April 1986
19:30 UTC+7

Indonesia	5–0	Canada
Report

Istora Senayan, Jakarta

23 April 1986
19:30 UTC+7

South Korea	5–0	Canada
Report

Istora Senayan, Jakarta

24 April 1986
19:30 UTC+7

England	0–5	Indonesia
Report

Istora Senayan, Jakarta

25 April 1986
19:30 UTC+7

England	4–1	Canada
Report

Istora Senayan, Jakarta

26 April 1986
19:30 UTC+7

South Korea	2–3	Indonesia
Report

Istora Senayan, Jakarta

27 April 1986
19:30 UTC+7

England	1–4	South Korea
Report

Istora Senayan, Jakarta

=== Knockout stage ===
==== Bracket ====
Semi-finals
China	4
South Korea	1
Japan	0
Indonesia	5

Final
China	3
Indonesia	2
Third place
South Korea	3
Japan	2

==== Semi-finals ====
29 April 1986
19:30 UTC+7

China	4–1	South Korea
Report

Istora Senayan, Jakarta

30 April 1986
19:30 UTC+7

Indonesia	5–0	Japan
Report

Istora Senayan, Jakarta

==== Third place ====
2 May 1986
19:30 UTC+7

South Korea	5–0	Japan
Report

Istora Senayan, Jakarta

==== Final ====
3 May 1986
19:30 UTC+7

China	3–2	Indonesia
Report

Istora Senayan, Jakarta

1986 Uber Cup winner

China
Second title
