= 1986 Thomas Cup group stage =

Badminton team tournament in Jakarta

The 1986 Thomas Cup group stage was held at Istora Senayan in Jakarta, Indonesia, from 22 to 27 April 1986.

The group stage was first stage of the tournament where only the two highest-placing teams in each of the two groups advanced to the knockout stage.

== Draw ==
The original draw for the tournament was conducted on 15 March 1986. The 8 teams will be drawn into two groups each containing four teams.

=== Group composition ===
Group
Group A	Group B
Denmark; Indonesia (Host); South Korea; Sweden	China; England; Malaysia; Singapore

== Group A ==
Pos	Team	Pld	W	L	GF	GA	GD	PF	PA	PD	Pts	Qualification
1	Indonesia	3	3	0	28	7	+21	482	329	+153	3	Advance to semi-finals
2	Denmark	3	2	1	17	15	+2	397	352	+45	2	Advance to semi-finals
3	South Korea	3	1	2	18	16	+2	408	410	−2	1	
4	Sweden	3	0	3	3	28	−25	256	452	−196	0	

Source: The Straits Times

=== South Korea vs Sweden ===
South Korea
5
Istora Senayan
22 April 1986, 19:30 UTC+7

Sweden
0

			1	2	3
1	(South Korea) (Sweden)	Park Joo-bong; Ulf Johansson	15; 7	15; 13
2	(South Korea) (Sweden)	Sung Han-kook; Jan-Eric Antonsson	15; 10	15; 7
3	(South Korea) (Sweden)	Choi Byung-hak; Jonas Herrgårdh	11; 15	15; 2	15; 8
4	(South Korea) (Sweden)	Kim Moon-soo / Park Joo-bong; Jan-Eric Antonsson / Stefan Karlsson	15; 7	15; 10
5	(South Korea) (Sweden)	Lee Sang-bok / Park Sung-bae; Pär-Gunnar Jönsson / Thomas Kihlström	18; 17	15; 8

=== Indonesia vs Sweden ===
Indonesia
5
Istora Senayan
23 April 1986, 19:30 UTC+7

Sweden
0

			1	2	3
1	(Indonesia) (Sweden)	Icuk Sugiarto; Ulf Johansson	15; 5	15; 7
2	(Indonesia) (Sweden)	Lius Pongoh; Jan-Eric Antonsson	15; 4	15; 5
3	(Indonesia) (Sweden)	Eddy Kurniawan; Jonas Herrgårdh	15; 6	15; 12
4	(Indonesia) (Sweden)	Bobby Ertanto / Liem Swie King; Stefan Karlsson / Thomas Kihlström	15; 5	15; 8
5	(Indonesia) (Sweden)	Hadibowo / Christian Hadinata; Jan-Eric Antonsson / Pär-Gunnar Jönsson	15; 4	15; 11

=== South Korea vs Denmark ===
South Korea
2
Istora Senayan
24 April 1986, 19:30 UTC+7

Denmark
3

			1	2	3
1	(South Korea) (Denmark)	Park Joo-bong; Morten Frost	7; 15	11; 15
2	(South Korea) (Denmark)	Park Sung-bae; Ib Frederiksen	4; 15	5; 15
3	(South Korea) (Denmark)	Choi Byung-hak; Michael Kjeldsen	9; 15	10; 15
4	(South Korea) (Denmark)	Kim Moon-soo / Park Joo-bong; Steen Fladberg / Morten Frost	15; 7	15; 11
5	(South Korea) (Denmark)	Kim Joong-soo / Sung Han-kook; Mark Christiansen / Jesper Helledie	15; 10	17; 15

=== Indonesia vs South Korea ===
Indonesia
4
Istora Senayan
25 April 1986, 19:30 UTC+7

South Korea
1

			1	2	3
1	(Indonesia) (South Korea)	Icuk Sugiarto; Park Joo-bong	15; 11	12; 15	4; 15
2	(Indonesia) (South Korea)	Lius Pongoh; Sung Han-kook	15; 10	15; 12
3	(Indonesia) (South Korea)	Liem Swie King; Choi Byung-hak	15; 5	15; 0
4	(Indonesia) (South Korea)	Hadibowo / Christian Hadinata; Lee Deuk-choon / Sung Han-kook	15; 14	17; 18	15; 8
5	(Indonesia) (South Korea)	Bobby Ertanto / Liem Swie King; Kim Moon-soo / Park Joo-bong	5; 15	15; 9	15; 4

=== Denmark vs Sweden ===
Denmark
4
Istora Senayan
26 April 1986, 19:30 UTC+7

Sweden
1

			1	2	3
1	(Denmark) (Sweden)	Morten Frost; Ulf Johansson	15; 4	15; 4
2	(Denmark) (Sweden)	Ib Frederiksen; Jan-Eric Antonsson	15; 13	15; 2
3	(Denmark) (Sweden)	Michael Kjeldsen; Jonas Herrgårdh	15; 8	15; 8
4	(Denmark) (Sweden)	Steen Fladberg / Jesper Helledie; Stefan Karlsson / Thomas Kihlström	6; 15	12; 15
5	(Denmark) (Sweden)	Mark Christiansen / Michael Kjeldsen; Jan-Eric Antonsson / Pär-Gunnar Jönsson	15; 10	15; 6

=== Indonesia vs Denmark ===
Indonesia
4
Istora Senayan
27 April 1986, 19:30 UTC+7

Denmark
1

			1	2	3
1	(Indonesia) (Denmark)	Icuk Sugiarto; Morten Frost	15; 7	15; 6
2	(Indonesia) (Denmark)	Liem Swie King; Ib Frederiksen	15; 6	15; 9
3	(Indonesia) (Denmark)	Eddy Kurniawan; Jens Peter Nierhoff	15; 12	15; 9
4	(Indonesia) (Denmark)	Hariamanto Kartono / Liem Swie King; Steen Fladberg / Jesper Helledie	15; 11	5; 15	15; 8
5	(Indonesia) (Denmark)	Hadibowo / Christian Hadinata; Mark Christiansen / Michael Kjeldsen	15; 10	3; 15	16; 18

== Group B ==
Pos	Team	Pld	W	L	GF	GA	GD	PF	PA	PD	Pts	Qualification
1	China	3	3	0	29	2	+27	456	220	+236	3	Advance to semi-finals
2	Malaysia	3	2	1	21	11	+10	410	324	+86	2	Advance to semi-finals
3	England	3	1	2	12	21	−9	345	415	−70	1	
4	Singapore	3	0	3	2	30	−28	228	480	−252	0	

Source: The Straits Times

=== China vs Singapore ===
China
5
Istora Senayan
22 April 1986, 19:30 UTC+7

Singapore
0

			1	2	3
1	(China) (Singapore)	Han Jian; Wong Shoon Soo	15; 8	15; 1
2	(China) (Singapore)	Yang Yang; Abdul Hamid Khan	15; 2	15; 4
3	(China) (Singapore)	Ding Qiqing; Lau Wing Cheok	15; 9	15; 9
4	(China) (Singapore)	Li Yongbo / Tian Bingyi; Sulaiman Zaini / Tan Eng Han	15; 4	15; 12
5	(China) (Singapore)	Zhang Qiang / Zhou Jincan; Robert Han / Tan Khee Wee	15; 9	15; 1

=== England vs Malaysia ===
England
1
Istora Senayan
23 April 1986, 19:30 UTC+7

Malaysia
4

			1	2	3
1	(England) (Malaysia)	Steve Baddeley; Misbun Sidek	10; 15	5; 15
2	(England) (Malaysia)	Nick Yates; Ong Beng Teong	15; 12	4; 15	15; 10
3	(England) (Malaysia)	Darren Hall; Foo Kok Keong	9; 15	15; 18
4	(England) (Malaysia)	Richard Outterside / Nigel Tier; Ong Beng Teong / Razif Sidek	9; 15	6; 15
5	(England) (Malaysia)	Chris Dobson / Andy Goode; Jalani Sidek / Rashid Sidek	10; 15	6; 15

=== China vs England ===
China
5
Istora Senayan
24 April 1986, 19:30 UTC+7

England
0

			1	2	3
1	(China) (England)	Han Jian; Steve Baddeley	15; 7	15; 6
2	(China) (England)	Yang Yang; Nick Yates	15; 3	15; 4
3	(China) (England)	Xiong Guobao; Darren Hall	15; 10	15; 6
4	(China) (England)	Li Yongbo / Tian Bingyi; Andy Goode / Nigel Tier	15; 7	15; 2
5	(China) (England)	Zhang Qiang / Zhou Jincan; Mike Brown / Richard Outterside	15; 5	18; 14

=== Malaysia vs Singapore ===
Malaysia
5
Istora Senayan
25 April 1986, 19:30 UTC+7

Singapore
0

			1	2	3
1	(Malaysia) (Singapore)	Misbun Sidek; Abdul Hamid Khan	15; 4	15; 5
2	(Malaysia) (Singapore)	Ong Beng Teong; Lau Wing Cheok	15; 12	18; 14
3	(Malaysia) (Singapore)	Foo Kok Keong; Wong Shoon Keat	15; 1	15; 10
4	(Malaysia) (Singapore)	Ong Beng Teong / Razif Sidek; Tan Eng Han / Tan Khee Wee	15; 5	15; 12
5	(Malaysia) (Singapore)	Jalani Sidek / Rashid Sidek; Robert Han / Lau Wing Cheok	15; 2	15; 2

=== China vs Malaysia ===
China
4
Istora Senayan
26 April 1986, 19:30 UTC+7

Malaysia
1

			1	2	3
1	(China) (Malaysia)	Han Jian; Misbun Sidek	15; 6	7; 15	9; 15
2	(China) (Malaysia)	Yang Yang; Foo Kok Keong	15; 5	15; 2
3	(China) (Malaysia)	Xiong Guobao; Chong Weng Kai	15; 3	15; 7
4	(China) (Malaysia)	Li Yongbo / Tian Bingyi; Jalani Sidek / Razif Sidek	15; 13	15; 12
5	(China) (Malaysia)	Zhang Qiang / Zhou Jincan; Ong Beng Teong / Rashid Sidek	17; 16	15; 3

=== England vs Singapore ===
England
5
Istora Senayan
27 April 1986, 19:30 UTC+7

Singapore
0

			1	2	3
1	(England) (Singapore)	Steve Baddeley; Wong Shoon Soo	15; 7	15; 4
2	(England) (Singapore)	Nick Yates; Abdul Hamid Khan	15; 2	15; 6
3	(England) (Singapore)	Darren Hall; Lau Wing Cheok	17; 14	8; 15	15; 9
4	(England) (Singapore)	Mike Brown / Richard Outterside; Tan Eng Han / Tan Khee Wee	17; 18	15; 3	15; 7
5	(England) (Singapore)	Andy Goode / Nigel Tier; Abdul Hamid Khan / Lau Wing Cheok	15; 11	15; 6
