= 1986 Uber Cup knockout stage =

Badminton championships

The knockout stage for the 1986 Uber Cup in Jakarta, Indonesia began on 29 April 1986 with the semi-finals and ended on 3 May 1986 with the final.

== Qualified teams ==
The top two placed teams from each of the two groups qualified for this stage.

Group	Winners	Runners-up
A	China	Japan
B	Indonesia	South Korea

== Bracket ==
Semi-finals
China	4
South Korea	1
Japan	0
Indonesia	5

Final
China	3
Indonesia	2
Third place
South Korea	3
Japan	2

== Semi-finals ==
=== Semi-final 1 ===
China
4
Istora Senayan
29 April 1986, 19:30 UTC+7

South Korea
1

			1	2	3
1	(China) (South Korea)	Li Lingwei; Kim Yun-ja	11; 9	11; 2
2	(China) (South Korea)	Han Aiping; Hwang Hye-young	11; 3	11; 3
3	(China) (South Korea)	Wu Jianqiu; Yoo Sang-hee	11; 7	1; 11	11; 5
4	(China) (South Korea)	Lin Ying / Wu Dixi; Chung Myung-hee / Hwang Hye-young	14; 17	4; 15
5	(China) (South Korea)	Han Aiping / Li Lingwei; Kim Yun-ja / Yoo Sang-hee	15; 1	15; 6

=== Semi-final 2 ===
Indonesia
5
Istora Senayan
30 April 1986, 19:30 UTC+7

Japan
0

			1	2	3
1	(Indonesia) (Japan)	Ivana Lie; Sumiko Kitada	12; 9	11; 2
2	(Indonesia) (Japan)	Elizabeth Latief; Kimiko Jinnai	11; 2	8; 11	11; 9
3	(Indonesia) (Japan)	Verawaty Fadjrin; Yoshiko Yonekura	9; 12	12; 9	11; 5
4	(Indonesia) (Japan)	Imelda Kurniawan / Rosiana Tendean; Sumiko Kitada / Harumi Kohara	15; 12	15; 10
5	(Indonesia) (Japan)	Verawaty Fadjrin / Yanti Kusmiati; Kimiko Jinnai / Hisako Takamine	17; 15	15; 7

== Third place ==
South Korea
3
Istora Senayan
2 May 1986, 19:30 UTC+7

Japan
2

			1	2	3
1	(South Korea) (Japan)	Kim Yun-ja; Sumiko Kitada	11; 6	12; 10
2	(South Korea) (Japan)	Yoo Sang-hee; Yoshiko Yonekura	8; 11	8; 11
3	(South Korea) (Japan)	Hwang Sun-ai; Harumi Kohara	3; 11	9; 10		retired
4	(South Korea) (Japan)	Kim Yun-ja / Yoo Sang-hee; Kazue Hoshi / Kazuko Takamine	15; 6	15; 10
5	(South Korea) (Japan)	Chung Myung-hee / Hwang Hye-young; Kimiko Jinnai / Hisako Takamine	15; 8	15; 12

== Final ==
China
3
Istora Senayan
3 May 1986, 19:30 UTC+7

Indonesia
2

			1	2	3
1	(China) (Indonesia)	Li Lingwei; Ivana Lie	12; 11	11; 3
2	(China) (Indonesia)	Han Aiping; Elizabeth Latief	11; 1	11; 3
3	(China) (Indonesia)	Wu Jianqui; Verawaty Fadjrin	12; 9	11; 7
4	(China) (Indonesia)	Lin Ying / Wu Dixi; Verawaty Fadjrin / Yanti Kusmiati	10; 15	13; 15
5	(China) (Indonesia)	Han Aiping / Li Lingwei; Imelda Kurniawan / Rosiana Tendean	11; 15	10; 15
