= 1986 Thomas Cup knockout stage =

Badminton championships

The knockout stage for the 1986 Thomas Cup in Jakarta, Indonesia began on 29 April 1986 with the semi-finals and ended on 4 May 1986 with the final.

== Qualified teams ==
The top two placed teams from each of the two groups qualified for this stage.

Group	Winners	Runners-up
A	Indonesia	Denmark
B	China	Malaysia

== Bracket ==
Semi-finals
Indonesia	4
Malaysia	1
Denmark	1
China	4

Final
Indonesia	2
China	3
Third place
Malaysia	3
Denmark	2

== Semi-finals ==
=== Semi-final 1 ===
China
4
Istora Senayan
29 April 1986, 19:30 UTC+7

Denmark
1

			1	2	3
1	(China) (Denmark)	Han Jian; Morten Frost	8; 15	3; 15
2	(China) (Denmark)	Yang Yang; Ib Frederiksen	15; 10	15; 8
3	(China) (Denmark)	Xiong Guobao; Michael Kjeldsen	18; 17	15; 1
4	(China) (Denmark)	Li Yongbo / Tian Bingyi; Steen Fladberg / Jesper Helledie	15; 6	15; 2
5	(China) (Denmark)	Zhang Qiang / Zhou Jincan; Mark Christiansen / Morten Frost	15; 4	15; 11

=== Semi-final 2 ===
Indonesia
4
Istora Senayan
30 April 1986, 19:30 UTC+7

Malaysia
1

			1	2	3
1	(Indonesia) (Malaysia)	Icuk Sugiarto; Misbun Sidek	15; 5	15; 1
2	(Indonesia) (Malaysia)	Lius Pongoh; Ong Beng Teong	15; 3	15; 4
3	(Indonesia) (Malaysia)	Liem Swie King; Foo Kok Keong	15; 3	8; 15	15; 9
4	(Indonesia) (Malaysia)	Hadibowo / Christian Hadinata; Ong Beng Teong / Rashid Sidek	15; 13	15; 3
5	(Indonesia) (Malaysia)	Bobby Ertanto / Liem Swie King; Jalani Sidek / Razif Sidek	15; 5	6; 15	14; 15

== Third place ==
Denmark
2
Istora Senayan
2 May 1986, 19:30 UTC+7

Malaysia
3

			1	2	3
1	(Denmark) (Malaysia)	Morten Frost; Misbun Sidek	13; 15			retired
2	(Denmark) (Malaysia)	Ib Frederiksen; Ong Beng Teong	1; 15	15; 12	15; 8
3	(Denmark) (Malaysia)	Poul-Erik Høyer Larsen; Foo Kok Keong	3; 15	5; 15
4	(Denmark) (Malaysia)	Jesper Helledie / Steen Fladberg; Jalani Sidek / Razif Sidek	10; 15	15; 4	9; 15
5	(Denmark) (Malaysia)	Mark Christiansen / Michael Kjeldsen; Ong Beng Teong / Rashid Sidek	15; 12	15; 8

== Final ==
Indonesia
2
Istora Senayan
4 May 1986, 19:30 UTC+7

China
3

			1	2	3
1	(Indonesia) (China)	Icuk Sugiarto; Yang Yang	7; 15	1; 15
2	(Indonesia) (China)	Lius Pongoh; Ding Qiqing	15; 12	11; 15	15; 1
3	(Indonesia) (China)	Liem Swie King; Xiong Guobao	13; 15	13; 15
4	(Indonesia) (China)	Hadibowo / Christian Hadinata; Zhang Qiang / Zhou Jincan	15; 13	15; 8
5	(Indonesia) (China)	Bobby Ertanto / Liem Swie King; Li Yongbo / Tian Bingyi	12; 15	9; 15
