= 1998 Singapore Open (badminton) =

Tournament details
- Dates: 10 August 1998– 16 August 1998
- Edition: 50th
- Level: World Grand Prix 5 Stars
- Total prize money: US$170,000
- Venue: Singapore Indoor Stadium
- Location: Kallang, Singapore

Champions
- Men's singles: (Indonesia) Hendrawan
- Women's singles: (China) Ye Zhaoying
- Men's doubles: (Indonesia) Sigit Budiarto (Indonesia) Candra Wijaya
- Women's doubles: (China) Ge Fei (China) Gu Jun
- Mixed doubles: (Indonesia) Tri Kusharjanto (Indonesia) Minarti Timur

The 1998 Singapore Open (also known as the Konica Cup) was a five-star badminton tournament that took place at the Singapore Indoor Stadium in Singapore, from August 10 to August 16, 1998. The total prize money on offer was US$170,000.

== Final results ==
Category	Winners	Runners-up	Score
Men's singles	(Indonesia) Hendrawan	(Denmark) Peter Gade	15–10, 15–8
Women's singles	(China) Ye Zhaoying	(Indonesia) Susi Susanti	11–5, 6–11, 11–2
Men's doubles	(Indonesia) Sigit Budiarto & Candra Wijaya	(Indonesia) Rexy Mainaky & Ricky Subagja	15–5, 15–5
Women's doubles	(China) Ge Fei & Gu Jun	(China) Tang Hetian & Qin Yiyuan	15–8, 15–13
Mixed doubles	(Indonesia) Tri Kusharjanto & Minarti Timur	(Denmark) Michael Søgaard & Rikke Olsen	15–10, 15–8
