= Chung Jae-hee =

South Korean badminton player

Personal information
- Born: 6 April 1978 (age 48) Busan, South Korea
- Height: 1.62 m (5 ft 4 in)
- Weight: 58 kg (128 lb)

Sport
- Country: South Korea
- Sport: Badminton
- Handedness: Right

Women's & mixed doubles
- Highest ranking: 1 (2002)
- BWF profile
Medal record
Women's badminton
Representing South Korea
World Championships
Silver medal – second place	1999 Copenhagen	Women's doubles
Sudirman Cup
Bronze medal – third place	1999 Copenhagen	Mixed team
Uber Cup
Bronze medal – third place	1998 Hong Kong	Women's team
Bronze medal – third place	2000 Kuala Lumpur	Women's team
Asian Games
Silver medal – second place	1998 Bangkok	Women's team
Bronze medal – third place	1998 Bangkok	Women's doubles
Asian Championships
Silver medal – second place	1999 Kuala Lumpur	Women's doubles
Bronze medal – third place	1996 Surabaya	Women's doubles
Bronze medal – third place	1998 Bangkok	Women's doubles
Bronze medal – third place	2000 Jakarta	Women's doubles
World Junior Championships
Bronze medal – third place	1994 Kuala Lumpur	Girls' doubles
Bronze medal – third place	1996 Silkeborg	Girls' doubles

Chung Jae-hee (Korean: 정재희; born 6 April 1978) is a South Korean badminton player who affiliated with the Samsung Electro-Mechanics. She competed at the 1996 and 2000 Summer Olympics. Together with Ra Kyung-min, they were the champion at the 1999 All England Open. She and Ra were placed first in the women's doubles world ranking in 2002.

== Achievements ==
=== World Championships ===
Women's doubles
Year	Venue	Partner	Opponent	Score	Result
1999	Brøndby Arena; Copenhagen, Denmark	(South Korea) Ra Kyung-min	(China) Ge Fei (China) Gu Jun	4–15, 5–15	Silver

=== Asian Games ===
Women's doubles
Year	Venue	Partner	Opponent	Score	Result
1998	Thammasat Gymnasium 2 Bangkok, Thailand	(South Korea) Ra Kyung-min	(China) Ge Fei (China) Gu Jun	11–15, 9–15	Bronze

=== Asian Championships ===
Women's doubles
Year	Venue	Partner	Opponent	Score	Result
1996	Pancasila Hall; Surabaya, Indonesia	(South Korea) Park Soo-yun	(Indonesia) Finarsih (Indonesia) Eliza Nathanael	10–15, 3–15	Bronze
1998	Nimibutr Stadium; Bangkok, Thailand	(South Korea) Yim Kyung-jin	(China) Qin Yiyuan (China) Tang Hetian	5–15, 5–15	Bronze
1999	Kuala Lumpur Badminton Stadium; Kuala Lumpur, Malaysia	(South Korea) Ra Kyung-min	(China) Ge Fei (China) Gu Jun	8–15, 10–15	Silver
2000	Istora Senayan; Jakarta, Indonesia	(South Korea) Lee Kyung-won	(Indonesia) Eti Tantri (Indonesia) Minarti Timur	12–15, 15–9, 13–15	Bronze

=== World Junior Championships ===
Girls' doubles
Year	Venue	Partner	Opponent	Score	Result
1994	Kuala Lumpur Badminton Stadium; Kuala Lumpur, Malaysia	(South Korea) Lee So-young	(China) Yao Jie (China) Liu Lu	9-15, 16-17	Bronze
1996	Silkeborg Hallerne; Silkeborg, Denmark	(South Korea) Yim Kyung-jin	(China) Gao Ling (China) Yang Wei	15–12, 10–15, 11–15	Bronze

=== IBF World Grand Prix ===
The World Badminton Grand Prix sanctioned by International Badminton Federation (IBF) since 1983.

Women's doubles
Year	Tournament	Partner	Opponent	Score	Result
1997	Hong Kong Open	(South Korea) Ra Kyung-min	(China) Liu Lu (China) Qian Hong	15–7, 15–12	(gold) Winner
1999	Swedish Open	(South Korea) Ra Kyung-min	(China) Huang Sui (China) Lu Ying	15–6, 15–11	(gold) Winner
1999	All England Open	(South Korea) Ra Kyung-min	(China) Huang Sui (China) Lu Ying	15–6, 15–8	(gold) Winner
1999	World Grand Prix Finals	(South Korea) Ra Kyung-min	(China) Ge Fei (China) Gu Jun	2–15, 4–15	(silver) Runner-up
2000	Korea Open	(South Korea) Ra Kyung-min	(China) Huang Nanyan (China) Yang Wei	15–6, 8–15, 15–5	(gold) Winner
2000	Chinese Taipei Open	(South Korea) Ra Kyung-min	(Denmark) Helene Kirkegaard (Denmark) Rikke Olsen	15–6, 15–7	(gold) Winner
2000	All England Open	(South Korea) Ra Kyung-min	(China) Ge Fei (China) Gu Jun	5–15, 3–15	(silver) Runner-up

Mixed doubles
Year	Tournament	Partner	Opponent	Score	Result
1997	Hong Kong Open	(South Korea) Ha Tae-kwon	(South Korea) Kim Dong-moon (South Korea) Ra Kyung-min	12–15, 3–15	(silver) Runner-up
1999	Swedish Open	(South Korea) Ha Tae-kwon	(South Korea) Kim Dong-moon (South Korea) Ra Kyung-min	1–15, 4–15	(silver) Runner-up
1999	All England Open	(South Korea) Ha Tae-kwon	(England) Simon Archer (England) Joanne Goode	2–15, 13–15	(silver) Runner-up
1999	Japan Open	(South Korea) Ha Tae-kwon	(China) Liu Yong (China) Ge Fei	1–15, 3–15	(silver) Runner-up

=== IBF International ===
Women's doubles
Year	Tournament	Partner	Opponent	Score	Result
1993	Hungarian International	(South Korea) Kim Kyung-ran	(South Korea) Cha Yoon-sook (South Korea) Yoo Eun-young	15–7, 15–10	(gold) Winner
1999	Australian International	(South Korea) Yim Kyung-jin	(South Korea) Lee Hyo-jung (South Korea) Ra Kyung-min	16–17, 15–6, 3–15	(silver) Runner-up
2002	Malaysia Satellite	(South Korea) Yim Kyung-jin	(South Korea) Jung Yeon-kyung (South Korea) Lee Kyung-won	11–2, 3–11, 11–8	(gold) Winner
