= 1997 IBF World Championships – Women's doubles =

Women's doubles at the 1997 IBF World Championships
- Venue: Scotstoun Centre
- Location: Glasgow, Scotland
- Dates: May 24, 1997 – June 1, 1997

Medalists
gold medal	Ge Fei; Gu Jun	China
silver medal	Qin Yiyuan; Tang Yongshu	China
bronze medal	Eliza Nathanael; Resiana Zelin	Indonesia
bronze medal	Qian Hong; Liu Lu	China

The 10th IBF World Championships (Badminton) were held in Glasgow, Scotland, between 24 May and 1 June 1997. Following the results of the women's doubles.

== Main stage ==
=== Section 1 ===
First round
(China) Ge Fei (China) Gu Jun	15	15
(France) Lilas Lefort (France) Tatiana Vattier	7	4
(Ukraine) Natalja Esipenko (Ukraine) Elena Nozdran	18	15
(Australia) Jenny Gibson (Austria) Simone Prutsch	3	5
(England) Emma Constable (England) Sarah Hardaker	18	15
(New Zealand) Tammy Jenkins (New Zealand) Rhona Robertson	15	11	8
(Slovenia) Darja Kranjc (Slovenia) Maja Pohar	w.o.
(Slovakia) Zuzana Kenizova (Slovakia) Kvetoslava Orlovska
(Denmark) Helene Kirkegaard (Denmark) Rikke Olsen	15	15
(Scotland) Alexis Barlow (Scotland) Sandra Watt	1	2
(Germany) Karen Neumann (Germany) Nicol Pitro	15	15
(Canada) Denyse Julien (Canada) Charmaine Reid	6	6
(South Korea) Cha Yoon-sook (South Korea) Park So-yun	15	15
(Chinese Taipei) Chen Mei-Cun (Chinese Taipei) Peng Ju-Yu	9	8
(Malaysia) Ishwarii Boopathy (Malaysia) Lee Yin Yin	4	15	15
(Brazil) Sandra Cattaneo Miashiro (Brazil) Min Huai Hao	1	1

Second round
(China) Ge Fei (China) Gu Jun	15	15
(Ukraine) Natalja Esipenko (Ukraine) Elena Nozdran	0	5
(England) Emma Constable (England) Sarah Hardaker	15	15
(Slovenia) Darja Kranjc (Slovenia) Maja Pohar	1	1
(Denmark) Helene Kirkegaard (Denmark) Rikke Olsen	15	15
(Germany) Karen Neumann (Germany) Nicol Pitro	6	7
(South Korea) Cha Yoon-sook (South Korea) Park So-yun	15	15
(Malaysia) Ishwarii Boopathy (Malaysia) Lee Yin Yin	11	6

Third round
(China) Ge Fei (China) Gu Jun	15	15
(England) Emma Constable (England) Sarah Hardaker	2	0
(Denmark) Helene Kirkegaard (Denmark) Rikke Olsen	15	15
(South Korea) Cha Yoon-sook (South Korea) Park So-yun	10	9

Quarterfinals
(China) Ge Fei (China) Gu Jun	15	15
(Denmark) Helene Kirkegaard (Denmark) Rikke Olsen	2	8

=== Section 2 ===
First round
(China) Qiang Hong (China) Liu Lu	15	15
(England) Sara Sankey (England) Joanne Wright	11	3
(Chinese Taipei) Chen Li-Chin (Chinese Taipei) Tsai Hui-Min	15	15
(Austria) Verena Fastenbauer (Austria) Sabine Salzer	4	6
(Russia) Svetlana Alferova (Russia) Marina Yakusheva	15	15
(Malaysia) Norhasikin Amin (Malaysia) Joanne Quay Swee Ling	8	2
(Hong Kong) Ng Ching (Hong Kong) Tung Chau Man	15	17
(Scotland) Carol Tedman (Scotland) Aileen Travers	4	9
(Indonesia) Indarti Issolina (Indonesia) Deyana Lomban	15	15
(Iceland) Vigdis Asgeirsdottir (Iceland) Birna Petersen	6	11
(Canada) Robbyn Hermitage (Canada) Kara Solmundson	15	15
(France) Armelle Cassen (France) Christelle Szynal	6	6
(Netherlands) Brenda Conijn (Netherlands) Nicole van Hooren	15	15
(United States) Donna Maria Beach (United States) Andrea Edstrom	2	12
(Sweden) Johanna Holgersson (Sweden) Jenny Karlsson	15	15
(South Korea) Lee Kyung-won (South Korea) Lee Soon-deuk	10	9

Second round
(China) Qiang Hong (China) Liu Lu	15	15
(Chinese Taipei) Chen Li-Chin (Chinese Taipei) Tsai Hui-Min	8	6
(Russia) Svetlana Alferova (Russia) Marina Yakusheva	15	15
(Hong Kong) Ng Ching (Hong Kong) Tung Chau Man	6	10
(Indonesia) Indarti Issolina (Indonesia) Deyana Lomban	15	15
(Canada) Robbyn Hermitage (Canada) Kara Solmundson	5	9
(Netherlands) Brenda Conijn (Netherlands) Nicole van Hooren	15	15
(Sweden) Johanna Holgersson (Sweden) Jenny Karlsson	4	7

Third round
(China) Qiang Hong (China) Liu Lu	15	15
(Russia) Svetlana Alferova (Russia) Marina Yakusheva	9	7
(Indonesia) Indarti Issolina (Indonesia) Deyana Lomban	15	15
(Netherlands) Brenda Conijn (Netherlands) Nicole van Hooren	2	6

Quarterfinals
(China) Qiang Hong (China) Liu Lu	15	15
(Indonesia) Indarti Issolina (Indonesia) Deyana Lomban	10	6

=== Section 3 ===
First round
(China) Qin Yiyuan (China) Tang Yongshu	18	15
(Japan) Satomi Igawa (Japan) Hiroko Nagamine	3	6
(Norway) Tove Hol (Norway) Sissel Linderoth	15	15
(Portugal) Ana Ferreira (Finland) Anu Weckström	9	11
(England) Julie Bradbury (England) Donna Kellogg	15	15
(Scotland) Kirsteen McEwan (Scotland) Elinor Middlemiss	2	6
(Sweden) Catrine Bengtsson (Sweden) Kristin Evernas	15	15
(Republic of Ireland) Keelin Fox (Republic of Ireland) Jayne Plunkett	1	2
(Denmark) Lisbet Stuer-Lauridsen (Denmark) Marlene Thomsen	15	15
(Russia) Nadezhda Chervyakova (Russia) Ella Karachkova	11	5
(France) Sandra Dimbour (France) Sandrine Lefevre	15	15
(Canada) Elma Ong (Canada) Moira Ong	7	11
(South Korea) Kim Mee-hyang (South Korea) Kim Shin-young	12	15	15
(Hong Kong) Louisa Koon Wai Chee (Hong Kong) Ling Wan Ting	8	5
(Indonesia) Eti Tantra (Indonesia) Cynthia Tuwankotta	18	6	15
(India) Madhumita Bisht (India) P. V. V. Lakshmi	14	15	11

Second round
(China) Qin Yiyuan (China) Tang Yongshu	15	15
(Norway) Tove Hol (Norway) Sissel Linderoth	4	1
(England) Julie Bradbury (England) Donna Kellogg	15	15
(Sweden) Catrine Bengtsson (Sweden) Kristin Evernas	6	11
(Denmark) Lisbet Stuer-Lauridsen (Denmark) Marlene Thomsen	15	15
(France) Sandra Dimbour (France) Sandrine Lefevre	4	4
(South Korea) Kim Mee-hyang (South Korea) Kim Shin-young	15	9	15
(Indonesia) Eti Tantra (Indonesia) Cynthia Tuwankotta	11	15	6

Third round
(China) Qin Yiyuan (China) Tang Yongshu	15	15
(England) Julie Bradbury (England) Donna Kellogg	4	4
(Denmark) Lisbet Stuer-Lauridsen (Denmark) Marlene Thomsen	15	15
(South Korea) Kim Mee-hyang (South Korea) Kim Shin-young	9	10

Quarterfinals
(China) Qin Yiyuan (China) Tang Yongshu	7	15	15
(Denmark) Lisbet Stuer-Lauridsen (Denmark) Marlene Thomsen	15	8	1

=== Section 4 ===
First round
(Indonesia) Eliza Nathanael (Indonesia) Zelin Resiana	15	15
(Chinese Taipei) Chan Ya-Lin (Chinese Taipei) Jeng Shwu-Jen	7	5
(South Korea) Chung Jae-hee (South Korea) Yim Kyung-jin	'18	15
(Germany) Katrin Schmidt (Germany) Kerstin Ubben	15	12
(China) Huang Nanyan (China) Liu Zhong	15	15
(Spain) Dolores Marco (Spain) Esther Sanz	4	3
(Bulgaria) Victoria Hristova (Bulgaria) Rayna Tzvetkova	15	15
(Brazil) Patricia Finardi (Brazil) Cristina Nakano	2	4
(Malaysia) Chor Hooi Yee (Malaysia) Lim Pek Siah	'18	15
(Thailand) Thitikan Duangsiri (Thailand) Pornsawan Plungwech	14	12
(England) Nichola Beck (England) Joanne Davies	11	15	'18
(Hungary) Csilla Forian (Hungary) Melinda Keszthelyi	3	1
(Netherlands) Monique Hoogland (Netherlands) Erica van den Heuvel	15	16	15
(Denmark) Ann Jorgensen (Denmark) Majken Vange	12	18	5
(Belarus) Tatiana Gerassimovitch (Belarus) Vlada Chernyavskaya	15	15
(Australia) Rhonda Cator (Australia) Kellie Lucas	7	11

Second round
(Indonesia) Eliza Nathanael (Indonesia) Zelin Resiana	15	15	15
(South Korea) Chung Jae-hee (South Korea) Yim Kyung-jin	12	18	7
(China) Huang Nanyan (China) Liu Zhong	15	15
(Bulgaria) Victoria Hristova (Bulgaria) Rayna Tzvetkova	7	1
(Malaysia) Chor Hooi Yee (Malaysia) Lim Pek Siah	15	8	17
(England) Nichola Beck (England) Joanne Davies	12	15	16
(Netherlands) Monique Hoogland (Netherlands) Erica van den Heuvel	15	15
(Belarus) Tatiana Gerassimovitch (Belarus) Vlada Chernyavskaya	12	4

Third round
(Indonesia) Eliza Nathanael (Indonesia) Zelin Resiana	17	18
(China) Huang Nanyan (China) Liu Zhong	15	16	13
(Malaysia) Chor Hooi Yee (Malaysia) Lim Pek Siah	15	9	15
(Netherlands) Monique Hoogland (Netherlands) Erica van den Heuvel	5	15	11

Quarterfinals
(Indonesia) Eliza Nathanael (Indonesia) Zelin Resiana	15	15
(Malaysia) Chor Hooi Yee (Malaysia) Lim Pek Siah	6	2

== Final stage ==
Quarterfinals
1	(China) Ge Fei (China) Gu Jun	15	15
(Denmark) Helene Kirkegaard (Denmark) Rikke Olsen	2	8
7	(China) Qiang Hong (China) Liu Lu	15	15
(Indonesia) Indarti Issolina (Indonesia) Deyana Lomban	10	6
5	(China) Qin Yiyuan (China) Tang Yongshu	7	15	15
(Denmark) Lisbet Stuer-Lauridsen (Denmark) Marlene Thomsen	15	8	1
2	(Indonesia) Eliza Nathanael (Indonesia) Zelin Resiana	15	15
(Malaysia) Chor Hooi Yee (Malaysia) Lim Pek Siah	6	2

Semifinals
1	(China) Ge Fei (China) Gu Jun	15	15
7	(China) Qiang Hong (China) Liu Lu	3	3
5	(China) Qin Yiyuan (China) Tang Yongshu	11	15	15
2	(Indonesia) Eliza Nathanael (Indonesia) Zelin Resiana	15	11	9

Finals
1	(China) Ge Fei (China) Gu Jun	15	15
5	(China) Qin Yiyuan (China) Tang Yongshu	1	8
