= 1997 Sudirman Cup =

Tournament details
- Dates: 19 May – 25 May
- Edition: 5th
- Venue: Scotstoun Leisure Centre
- Location: Glasgow, Scotland

The 1997 Sudirman Cup was the fifth tournament of the World Mixed Team Badminton Championships. It was held from May 19 to May 25, 1997 in Glasgow, Scotland.

== Results ==
59 teams competed in this edition of Sudirman Cup. Nigeria, Morocco, Turkmenistan, Uganda and Zambia also entered, but ultimately did not participate.

=== Group 1 ===
==== Subgroup 1A ====
Team one	Team two	Score
China	England	5–0
South Korea	England	4–1
China	South Korea	3–2

China
5
Glasgow, Scotland
20 May 1997

England
0

			1	2	3
1	(China) (England)	Liu Yong / Ge Fei; Nick Ponting / Julie Bradbury	15; 7	17; 14
2	(China) (England)	Dong Jiong; Peter Knowles	15; 9	15; 6
3	(China) (England)	Ye Zhaoying; Julia Mann	11; 0	11; 2
4	(China) (England)	Liu Yong / Zhang Wei; Simon Archer / Chris Hunt	15; 9	10; 15	15; 5
5	(China) (England)	Qin Yiyuan / Tang Yongshu; Joanne Davies / Donna Kellogg	15; 4	15; 7

South Korea
4
Glasgow, Scotland
21 May 1997

England
1

			1	2	3
1	(South Korea) (England)	Kim Dong-moon / Ra Kyung-min; Simon Archer / Julie Bradbury	15; 13	15; 11
2	(South Korea) (England)	Park Sung-woo; Darren Hall	10; 15	15; 17
3	(South Korea) (England)	Kim Ji-hyun; Julia Mann	11; 5	11; 1
4	(South Korea) (England)	Ha Tae-kwon / Kang Kyung-jin; Simon Archer / Chris Hunt	15; 8	15; 8
5	(South Korea) (England)	Chung Jae-hee / Kim Shin-young; Julie Bradbury / Donna Kellogg	15; 6	15; 8

China
3
Glasgow, Scotland
22 May 1997

South Korea
2

			1	2	3
1	(China) (South Korea)	Ge Fei / Gu Jun; Kim Mee-hyang / Kim Shin-young	15; 4	15; 9
2	(China) (South Korea)	Dong Jiong; Jang Chun-woong	15; 9	15; 6
3	(China) (South Korea)	Gong Zhichao; Lee Joo-hyun	11; 5	11; 0
4	(China) (South Korea)	Ge Cheng / Tao Xiaoqiang; Ha Tae-kwon / Kang Kyung-jin	3; 15	10; 15
5	(China) (South Korea)	Liu Yong / Ge Fei; Kim Dong-moon / Ra Kyung-min	15; 7	2; 15	11; 15

==== Subgroup 1B ====
Team one	Team two	Score
Indonesia	Sweden	5–0
Denmark	Sweden	4–1
Denmark	Indonesia	3–2

Indonesia
5
Glasgow, Scotland
20 May 1997

Sweden
0

			1	2	3
1	(Indonesia) (Sweden)	Sigit Budiarto / Candra Wijaya; Peter Axelsson / Pär-Gunnar Jönsson	15; 8	15; 10
2	(Indonesia) (Sweden)	Eliza Nathanael / Zelin Resiana; Marina Andrievskaya / Catrine Bengtsson	15; 8	17; 15
3	(Indonesia) (Sweden)	Joko Suprianto; Tomas Johansson	16; 18	15; 3	15; 9
4	(Indonesia) (Sweden)	Mia Audina; Margit Borg	11; 7	11; 8
5	(Indonesia) (Sweden)	Tri Kusharjanto / Minarti Timur; Peter Axelsson / Catrine Bengtsson	15; 9	17; 14

Denmark
4
Glasgow, Scotland
21 May 1997

Sweden
1

			1	2	3
1	(Denmark) (Sweden)	Camilla Martin; Marina Andrievskaya	11; 3	11; 3
2	(Denmark) (Sweden)	Michael Søgaard / Rikke Olsen; Jens Olsson / Astrid Crabo	15; 6	15; 3
3	(Denmark) (Sweden)	Thomas Stuer-Lauridsen; Rikard Magnusson	18; 14	15; 1
4	(Denmark) (Sweden)	Jim Laugesen / Thomas Stavngaard; Peter Axelsson / Pär-Gunnar Jönsson	15; 11	17; 14
5	(Denmark) (Sweden)	Lisbet Stuer-Lauridsen / Marlene Thomsen; Marina Andrievskaya / Catrine Bengtsson	9; 15	3; 15

Denmark
3
Glasgow, Scotland
22 May 1997

Indonesia
2

			1	2	3
1	(Denmark) (Indonesia)	Poul-Erik Høyer Larsen; Hariyanto Arbi	17; 15	12; 15	15; 4
2	(Denmark) (Indonesia)	Camilla Martin; Susi Susanti	6; 11	3; 11
3	(Denmark) (Indonesia)	Jon Holst-Christensen / Michael Søgaard; Rexy Mainaky / Ricky Subagja	15; 18	12; 15
4	(Denmark) (Indonesia)	Helene Kirkegaard / Rikke Olsen; Eliza Nathanael / Zelin Resiana	17; 14	14; 17	15; 10
5	(Denmark) (Indonesia)	Jens Eriksen / Marlene Thomsen; Flandy Limpele / Minarti Timur	15; 6	15; 12

==== Semi-finals ====
Team one	Team two	Score
China	Indonesia	3–2
South Korea	Denmark	3–2

China
3
Glasgow, Scotland
23 May 1997

Indonesia
2

			1	2	3
1	(China) (Indonesia)	Liu Yong / Ge Fei; Flandy Limpele / Minarti Timur	18; 15	15; 13
2	(China) (Indonesia)	Ye Zhaoying; Susi Susanti	11; 6	6; 11	0; 11
3	(China) (Indonesia)	Dong Jiong; Ardy Wiranata	15; 2	15; 8
4	(China) (Indonesia)	Liu Yong / Sun Jun; Sigit Budiarto / Candra Wijaya	8; 15	6; 15
5	(China) (Indonesia)	Ge Fei / Gu Jun; Eliza Nathanael / Zelin Resiana	15; 3	15; 3

South Korea
3
Glasgow, Scotland
23 May 1997

Denmark
2

			1	2	3
1	(South Korea) (Denmark)	Kim Dong-moon / Ra Kyung-min; Jens Eriksen / Marlene Thomsen	15; 10	15; 13
2	(South Korea) (Denmark)	Park Sung-woo; Peter Rasmussen	6; 15	15; 11	15; 4
3	(South Korea) (Denmark)	Kim Ji-hyun; Camilla Martin	7; 11	0; 11
4	(South Korea) (Denmark)	Ha Tae-kwon / Kang Kyung-jin; Jon Holst-Christensen / Michael Søgaard	15; 11	18; 16
5	(South Korea) (Denmark)	Kim Shin-young / Ra Kyung-min; Helene Kirkegaard / Rikke Olsen	9; 15	11; 15

==== Relegation playoff ====
Team one	Team two	Score
Sweden	England	4–1

Sweden
4
Glasgow, Scotland
23 May 1997

England
1

			1	2	3
1	(Sweden) (England)	Marina Andrievskaya / Catrine Bengtsson; Julie Bradbury / Donna Kellogg	15; 10	15; 10
2	(Sweden) (England)	Peter Axelsson / Pär-Gunnar Jönsson; Nick Ponting / Chris Hunt	15; 3	15; 8
3	(Sweden) (England)	Tomas Johansson; Darren Hall	15; 7	15; 18	15; 10
4	(Sweden) (England)	Marina Andrievskaya; Julia Mann	11; 3	11; 7
5	(Sweden) (England)	Peter Axelsson / Jenny Karlsson; Simon Archer / Julie Bradbury	7; 15	15; 13	7; 15

==== Final ====
Team one	Team two	Score
China	South Korea	5–0

China
5
Glasgow, Scotland
24 May 1997

South Korea
0

			1	2	3
1	(China) (South Korea)	Liu Yong / Ge Fei; Kim Dong-moon / Ra Kyung-min	15; 7	15; 8
2	(China) (South Korea)	Dong Jiong; Park Sung-woo	15; 9	15; 11
3	(China) (South Korea)	Gong Zhichao; Lee Joo-hyun	11; 2	11; 7
4	(China) (South Korea)	Chen Xingdong / Lin Liwen; Ha Tae-kwon / Kang Kyung-jin	15; 7	15; 2
5	(China) (South Korea)	Ge Fei / Gu Jun; Kim Shin-young / Ra Kyung-min	15; 7	15; 10

1997 Sudirman Cup Champions

China
Second title

=== Group 2 ===
==== Subgroup 2A ====
Team one	Team two	Score
Germany	Chinese Taipei	3-2
Germany	Japan	3-2
Germany	Thailand	3-2
Chinese Taipei	Japan	3-2
Chinese Taipei	Thailand	3-2
Japan	Thailand	3-2

==== Subgroup 2B ====
Team one	Team two	Score
Malaysia	Netherlands	3-2
Malaysia	Russia	3-2
Malaysia	Canada	4-1
Netherlands	Russia	3-2
Netherlands	Canada	5-0
Russia	Canada	3-2

==== Playoff ====
Team one	Team two	Score	Notes
Malaysia	Germany	3-2	7th-8th
Chinese Taipei	Netherlands	3-2	9th-10th
Russia	Japan	3-2	11th-12th
Thailand	Canada	3-2	13th-14th

=== Group 3 ===
==== Subgroup 3A ====
Team one	Team two	Score
Australia	Hong Kong	3-2
Australia	Finland	3-2
Australia	Austria	3-2
Hong Kong	Finland	3-2
Hong Kong	Austria	3-1
Finland	Austria	3-2

==== Subgroup 3B ====
Team one	Team two	Score
Scotland	New Zealand	3-2
Scotland	India	3-2
Scotland	Norway	5-0
New Zealand	India	5-0
New Zealand	Norway	4-1
India	Norway	4-1

==== Playoff ====
Team one	Team two	Score	Notes
Scotland	Australia	3-2	15th-16th
Hong Kong	New Zealand	3-2	17th-18th
India	Finland	4-1	19th-20th
Norway	Austria	4-1	21st-22nd

=== Group 4 ===
==== Subgroup 4A ====
Team one	Team two	Score
United States	Poland	3-2
United States	Iceland	4-1
United States	Bulgaria	5-0
Poland	Iceland	4-1
Poland	Bulgaria	5-0
Iceland	Bulgaria	3-2

==== Subgroup 4B ====
Team one	Team two	Score
Ukraine	Wales	3-2
Ukraine	Switzerland	5-0
Ukraine	Czech Republic	5-0
Wales	Switzerland	5-0
Wales	Czech Republic	4-1
Switzerland	Czech Republic	3-2

==== Playoff ====
Team one	Team two	Score	Notes
Ukraine	United States	4-1	23rd-24th
Poland	Wales	3-2	25th-26th
Iceland	Switzerland	3-2	27th-28th
Bulgaria	Czech Republic	3-2	29th-30th

=== Group 5 ===
==== Subgroup 5A ====
Team one	Team two	Score
Belarus	France	4-1
Belarus	Portugal	5-0
Belarus	Belgium	5-0
France	Portugal	3-2
France	Belgium	5-0
Portugal	Belgium	4-1

==== Subgroup 5B ====
Team one	Team two	Score
(Republic of Ireland) Ireland	Spain	4-1
(Republic of Ireland) Ireland	Peru	4-1
(Republic of Ireland) Ireland	Kazakhstan	4-1
Spain	Peru	4-1
Spain	Kazakhstan	5-0
Peru	Kazakhstan	3-2

==== Playoff ====
Team one	Team two	Score	Notes
Belarus	(Republic of Ireland) Ireland	4-1	31st-32nd
France	Spain	4-1	33rd-34th
Portugal	Peru	3-2	35th-36th
Kazakhstan	Belgium	4-1	37th-38th

=== Group 6 ===
==== Subgroup 6A ====
Team one	Team two	Score
Sri Lanka	Slovenia	4-1
Sri Lanka	Pakistan	4-1
Sri Lanka	Guatemala	4-1
Slovenia	Pakistan	3-2
Slovenia	Guatemala	3-2
Pakistan	Guatemala	3-2

==== Subgroup 6B ====
Team one	Team two	Score
Israel	South Africa	3-2
Israel	Jamaica	3-2
Israel	Mauritius	2-3
South Africa	Jamaica	4-1
South Africa	Mauritius	4-1
Jamaica	Mauritius	3-2

==== Playoff ====
Team one	Team two	Score	Notes
Sri Lanka	Israel	3-2	39th-40th
Slovenia	South Africa	3-2	41st-42nd
Jamaica	Pakistan	3-2	43rd-44th
Mauritius	Guatemala	3-2	45th-46th

=== Group 7 ===
==== Subgroup 7A ====
Team one	Team two	Score
Cyprus	Mexico	5-0
Cyprus	Malta	4-1
Cyprus	Luxembourg	3-2
Mexico	Malta	4-1
Mexico	Luxembourg	4-1
Malta	Luxembourg	3-2

==== Subgroup 7B ====
Team one	Team two	Score
Italy	Slovakia	4-1
Italy	Brazil	5-0
Italy	Argentina	5-0
Slovakia	Brazil	5-0
Slovakia	Argentina	5-0
Brazil	Argentina	5-0

==== Playoff ====
Team one	Team two	Score	Notes
Italy	Cyprus	5-0	47th-48th
Slovakia	Mexico	4-1	49th-50th
Brazil	Malta	3-2	51st-52nd
Luxembourg	Argentina	4-1	53rd-54th

=== Group 8 ===
Team one	Team two	Score
Lithuania	Estonia	3-2
Lithuania	Armenia	5-0
Lithuania	Greece	4-1
Lithuania	Chile	5-0
Estonia	Armenia	5-0
Estonia	Greece	5-0
Estonia	Chile	5-0
Armenia	Greece	3-2
Armenia	Chile	5-0
Greece	Chile	5-0

== Final classification ==
Group 1
Pos	Country
1	China
2	South Korea
3	Denmark
3	Indonesia
5	Sweden
6	England

Group 2
Pos	Country
7	Malaysia
8	Germany
9	Chinese Taipei
10	Netherlands
11	Russia
12	Japan
13	Thailand
14	Canada

Group 3
Pos	Country
15	Scotland
16	Australia
17	Hong Kong
18	New Zealand
19	India
20	Finland
21	Norway
22	Austria

Group 4
Pos	Country
23	Ukraine
24	United States
25	Poland
26	Wales
27	Iceland
28	Switzerland
29	Bulgaria
30	Czech Republic

Group 5
Pos	Country
31	Belarus
32	Ireland
33	France
34	Spain
35	Portugal
36	Peru
37	Kazakhstan
38	Belgium

Group 6
Pos	Country
39	Sri Lanka
40	Israel
41	Slovenia
42	South Africa
43	Jamaica
44	Pakistan
45	Mauritius
46	Guatemala

Group 7
Pos	Country
47	Italy
48	Cyprus
49	Slovakia
50	Mexico
51	Brazil
52	Malta
53	Luxembourg
54	Argentina

Group 8
Pos	Country
55	Lithuania
56	Estonia
57	Armenia
58	Greece
59	Chile

Promoted to higher group
Relegated to lower group
