= Liu Lu (badminton) =

Chinese badminton player (born 1977)

Liu Lu 刘璐
Personal information
- Born: 19 March 1977 (age 49) Yichang, Hubei, China
- Height: 1.72 m (5 ft 8 in)

Sport
- Country: China
- Sport: Badminton
- Handedness: Right

Women's singles & doubles
- Highest ranking: 4 (WD January 1998)
- BWF profile
Medal record
Women's badminton
Representing China
World Championships
Bronze medal – third place	1997 Glasgow	Women's doubles
Uber Cup
Gold medal – first place	1998 Hong Kong	Women's team
Asian Championships
Gold medal – first place	1997 Kuala Lumpur	Mixed doubles
Silver medal – second place	1997 Kuala Lumpur	Women's doubles
World Junior Championships
Gold medal – first place	1994 Kuala Lumpur	Girls' doubles
Bronze medal – third place	1994 Kuala Lumpur	Mixed doubles

Liu Lu (Chinese: 刘璐; pinyin: Liú Lù; born 19 March 1977) is a former Chinese badminton player. She was part of the national team that clinched an Uber Cup in 1998 Hong Kong. In the individual events, she participated at the 1994 World Junior Championships clinched a gold medal in the girls' doubles event partnered with Yao Jie. Teamed-up with Qian Hong, she won the women's doubles title at the 1996 Scottish Open and 1997 Swedish Open. Liu also won a gold and a silver medal at the 1997 Asian Championships in the mixed doubles event with Zhang Jun, and in the women's doubles with Qian respectively. Liu and Qian also settled for a bronze medal at the 1997 World Championships. In January 1998, she was recorded as women's doubles world No. 4 in the IBF world ranking.

== Achievements ==
=== BWF World Championships ===
Women's doubles
Year	Venue	Partner	Opponent	Score	Result
1997	Scotstoun Centre; Glasgow, Scotland	(China) Qian Hong	(China) Ge Fei (China) Gu Jun	3–15, 3–15	Bronze

=== Asian Championships ===
Women's doubles
Year	Venue	Partner	Opponent	Score	Result
1997	Kuala Lumpur, Malaysia	(China) Qian Hong	(China) Liu Zhong (China) Huang Nanyan	15–12, 14–17, 6–15	Silver

Mixed doubles
Year	Venue	Partner	Opponent	Score	Result
1997	Kuala Lumpur, Malaysia	(China) Zhang Jun	(China) Yang Ming (China) Qian Hong	15–12, 17–16, 15–0	Gold

=== World Junior Championships ===
Girls' doubles
Year	Venue	Partner	Opponent	Score	Result
1994	Kuala Lumpur Badminton Stadium; Kuala Lumpur, Malaysia	(China) Yao Jie	(China) Wang Li (China) Qian Hong	17–16, 7–15, 15–7	Gold

=== IBF World Grand Prix ===
The World Badminton Grand Prix sanctioned by International Badminton Federation (IBF) since 1983.

Women's doubles
Year	Tournament	Partner	Opponent	Score	Result
1998	Hong Kong Open	(China) Qian Hong	(China) Chen Lin (China) Jiang Xuelian	4–15, 11–15	(silver) Runner-up
1997	Hong Kong Open	(China) Qian Hong	(South Korea) Chung Jae-hee (South Korea) Ra Kyung-min	7–15, 12–15	(silver) Runner-up
1997	Malaysia Open	(China) Qian Hong	(China) Ge Fei (China) Gu Jun	7–15, 1–15	(silver) Runner-up
1997	Swedish Open	(China) Qian Hong	(England) Julie Bradbury (England) Donna Kellogg	15–11, 17–18, 15–11	(gold) Winner
1996	Malaysia Open	(China) Qian Hong	(Denmark) Lisbeth Stuer-Lauridsen (Denmark) Marlene Thomsen	15–10, 15–17, 15–17	(silver) Runner-up

=== IBF International ===
Women's doubles
Year	Tournament	Partner	Opponent	Score	Result
1996	Scottish Open	(China) Qian Hong	(England) Joanne Goode (England) Gillian Gowers	8–15, 15–3, 15–5	(gold) Winner
