= 1997 IBF World Championships =

Tournament details
- Dates: 24 May – 1 June
- Edition: 10th
- Level: International
- Venue: Scotstoun Centre
- Location: Glasgow, Scotland

The 1997 IBF World Championships (Badminton) were held in Glasgow, Scotland, between 24 May and 1 June 1997.

== Venue ==
- Scotstoun Centre

== Medalists ==
=== Medal table ===
* Host nation (Scotland)

Rank	Nation	Gold	Silver	Bronze	Total
1	China	3	3	3	9
2	Denmark	1	1	2	4
3	Indonesia	1	0	4	5
4	Malaysia	0	1	0	1
5	South Korea	0	0	1	1
Totals (5 entries)		5	5	10	20

=== Events ===
Event	Gold	Silver	Bronze
Men's Singles	(Denmark) Peter Rasmussen	(China) Sun Jun	(Indonesia) Heryanto Arbi
Men's Singles	(Denmark) Peter Rasmussen	(China) Sun Jun	(Denmark) Poul-Erik Høyer Larsen
Women's Singles	(China) Ye Zhaoying	(China) Gong Zhichao	(China) Han Jingna
Women's Singles	(China) Ye Zhaoying	(China) Gong Zhichao	(China) Wang Chen
Men's Doubles	(Indonesia) Candra Wijaya (Indonesia) Sigit Budiarto	(Malaysia) Yap Kim Hock (Malaysia) Cheah Soon Kit	(South Korea) Lee Dong-soo (South Korea) Yoo Yong-sung
Men's Doubles	(Indonesia) Candra Wijaya (Indonesia) Sigit Budiarto	(Malaysia) Yap Kim Hock (Malaysia) Cheah Soon Kit	(Indonesia) Ricky Subagja (Indonesia) Rexy Mainaky
Women's Doubles	(China) Ge Fei (China) Gu Jun	(China) Qin Yiyuan (China) Tang Yongshu	(Indonesia) Eliza Nathanael (Indonesia) Resiana Zelin
Women's Doubles	(China) Ge Fei (China) Gu Jun	(China) Qin Yiyuan (China) Tang Yongshu	(China) Qian Hong (China) Liu Lu
Mixed Doubles	(China) Liu Yong (China) Ge Fei	(Denmark) Jens Eriksen (Denmark) Marlene Thomsen	(Indonesia) Trikus Heryanto (Indonesia) Minarti Timur
Mixed Doubles	(China) Liu Yong (China) Ge Fei	(Denmark) Jens Eriksen (Denmark) Marlene Thomsen	(Denmark) Michael Søgaard (Denmark) Rikke Olsen
