= 1994 IBF World Junior Championships =

Badminton championships

Tournament details
- Dates: 28 August - 3 September 1994
- Edition: 2nd
- Level: International
- Venue: Kuala Lumpur Badminton Stadium
- Location: Kuala Lumpur, Malaysia

Champions
- Men's singles: (China) Chen Gang
- Women's singles: (China) Wang Chen
- Men's doubles: (Denmark) Peter Gade (Denmark) Peder Nissen
- Women's doubles: (China) Yao Jie (China) Liu Lu
- Mixed doubles: (China) Zhang Wei (China) Qian Hong

The 1994 IBF World Junior Championships was an international badminton tournament held in Kuala Lumpur, Malaysia.

== Medalists ==
Event	Gold	Silver	Bronze
Boys singles	(China) Chen Gang	(China) Zheng Qiang	(China) Luo Xilin
Boys singles	(China) Chen Gang	(China) Zheng Qiang	(Malaysia) Loo Yiew Loong
Girls singles	(China) Wang Chen	(China) Zeng Yaqiong	(China) Dai Yun
Girls singles	(China) Wang Chen	(China) Zeng Yaqiong	(China) Xu Li
Boys doubles	(Denmark) Peter Gade and Peder Nissen	(Indonesia) Eng Hian and Andreas	(Malaysia) Loo Yiew Loong and Wong Choong Hann
Boys doubles	(Denmark) Peter Gade and Peder Nissen	(Indonesia) Eng Hian and Andreas	(South Korea) Bae Gi-dae and Kim Hyung-joon
Girls doubles	(China) Yao Jie and Liu Lu	(China) Wang Li and Qian Hong	(South Korea) Chung Jae-hee and Lee So-young
Girls doubles	(China) Yao Jie and Liu Lu	(China) Wang Li and Qian Hong	(Malaysia) Norhasikin Amin and Chan Chia Fong
Mixed doubles	(China) Zhang Wei and Qian Hong	(China) Yang Bing and Yao Jie	(China) Zhu Jianwen and Liu Lu
Mixed doubles	(China) Zhang Wei and Qian Hong	(China) Yang Bing and Yao Jie	(England) Nathan Robertson and Gail Emms

== Individual competition ==
=== Semifinals ===
Category	Winners	Opponent	Score
Men's singles	(China) Zheng Qiang	(Malaysia) Loo Yiew Loong	15-3, 15-12
Men's singles	(China) Chen Gang	(China) Luo Xilin	15-4, 15-4
Women's singles	(China) Zeng Yaqiong	(China) Dai Yun	12-10, 11-9
Women's singles	(China) Wang Chen	(China) Xu Li	11-8, 11-5
Men's doubles	(Denmark) Peter Gade/Peder Nissen	(Malaysia) Loo Yiew Loong/Wong Choong Hann	17-14, 15-6
Men's doubles	(Indonesia) Eng Hian/Andreas	(South Korea) Bae Gi-dae/Kim Hyung-joon	15-9, 15-5
Women's doubles	(China) Yao Jie/Liu Lu	(South Korea) Chung Jae-hee/Lee So-young	15-9, 17-16
Women's doubles	(China) Wang Li/Qian Hong	(Malaysia) Norhasikin Amin/Chan Chia Fong	15-4, 15-6
Mixed doubles	(China) Zhang Wei/Qian Hong	(England) Nathan Robertson/Gail Emms	17-14, 15-5
Mixed doubles	(China) Yang Bing/Yao Jie	(China) Zhu Jianwen/Liu Lu	15-3, 15-4

=== Finals ===
Category	Winners	Runners-up	Score
Men's singles	(China) Chen Gang	(China) Zheng Qiang	15–9, 15–3
Women's singles	(China) Wang Chen	(China) Zeng Yaqiong	3–11, 11–5, 11–4
Men's doubles	(Denmark) Peter Gade / Peder Nissen	(Indonesia) Eng Hian / Andreas	15–10, 15–11
Women's doubles	(China) Yao Jie / Liu Lu	(China) Wang Li / Qian Hong	17–16, 7–15, 15–7
Mixed doubles	(China) Zhang Wei / Qian Hong	(China) Yang Bing / Yao Jie	15–8, 15–6
