= Gu Jun =

Chinese badminton player

Gu Jun 顾俊
Personal information
- Born: 3 January 1975 (age 51) Wuxi, Jiangsu, China
- Height: 1.65 m (5 ft 5 in)
- Weight: 62 kg (137 lb)

Sport
- Country: China
- Sport: Badminton
- Handedness: Right

Women's doubles
- Highest ranking: 1 with Ge Fei
- BWF profile
Medal record
Women's badminton
Representing China
Olympic Games
Gold medal – first place	1996 Atlanta	Women's doubles
Gold medal – first place	2000 Sydney	Women's doubles
World Championships
Gold medal – first place	1997 Glasgow	Women's doubles
Gold medal – first place	1999 Copenhagen	Women's doubles
World Cup
Gold medal – first place	1996 Jakarta	Women's doubles
Gold medal – first place	1997 Yogyakarta	Women's doubles
Silver medal – second place	1994 Ho Chi Minh	Mixed doubles
Sudirman Cup
Gold medal – first place	1995 Lausanne	Mixed team
Gold medal – first place	1997 Glasgow	Mixed team
Gold medal – first place	1999 Copenhagen	Mixed team
Uber Cup
Gold medal – first place	1998 Hong Kong	Women's team
Gold medal – first place	2000 Kuala Lumpur	Women's team
Silver medal – second place	1994 Jakarta	Women's team
Silver medal – second place	1996 Hong Kong	Women's team
Asian Games
Gold medal – first place	1998 Bangkok	Women's doubles
Gold medal – first place	1998 Bangkok	Women's team
Bronze medal – third place	1994 Hiroshima	Women's doubles
Bronze medal – third place	1994 Hiroshima	Women's team
Asian Championships
Gold medal – first place	1994 Shanghai	Women's doubles
Gold medal – first place	1995 Beijing	Women's doubles
Gold medal – first place	1998 Bangkok	Women's doubles
Gold medal – first place	1999 Kuala Lumpur	Women's doubles
Asian Cup
Gold medal – first place	1995 Qingdao	Women's doubles
World Junior Championships
Gold medal – first place	1992 Jakarta	Girls' doubles
Bronze medal – third place	1992 Jakarta	Mixed doubles

Gu Jun (simplified Chinese: 顾俊; traditional Chinese: 顧俊; pinyin: Gù Jùn; born 3 January 1975) is a Chinese former badminton player.

== Career ==
Gu and her regular partner Ge Fei were the world's dominant women's doubles team from the mid-1990s to their retirement after the 2000 Olympics. They won over thirty top tier international tournaments together, including two Olympic competitions and two IBF World Championships (which were then held biennially). They helped China to regain the Uber Cup (women's world team trophy) from Indonesia in 1998, and to retain the Cup in 2000. Gu Jun was elected to the World Badminton Hall of Fame in 2008.

=== Summer Olympics ===
Gu competed in the Atlanta 1996 Olympics in the women's doubles with Ge Fei. They won the gold medal by beating Gil Young-ah and Jang Hye-ock of South Korea 15–5, 15–5 in the final match.

Gu and Ge successfully defended their women's doubles title in the Sydney 2000 Olympics. They won by the same score as 1996, this time against their compatriots Huang Nanyan and Yang Wei.

== Achievements ==
=== Olympic Games ===
Women's doubles
Year	Venue	Partner	Opponent	Score	Result
1996	GSU Sports Arena, Atlanta, United States	(China) Ge Fei	(South Korea) Gil Young-ah (South Korea) Jang Hye-ock	15–5, 15–5	Gold
2000	The Dome, Sydney, Australia	(China) Ge Fei	(China) Huang Nanyan (China) Yang Wei	15–5, 15–5	Gold

=== World Championships ===
Women's doubles
Year	Venue	Partner	Opponent	Score	Result
1997	Scotstoun Centre, Glasgow, Scotland	(China) Ge Fei	(China) Qin Yiyuan (China) Tang Yongshu	15–1, 15–7	Gold
1999	Brøndby Arena, Copenhagen, Denmark	(China) Ge Fei	(South Korea) Chung Jae-hee (South Korea) Ra Kyung-min	15–4, 15–5	Gold

=== World Cup ===
Women's doubles
Year	Venue	Partner	Opponent	Score	Result
1996	Istora Senayan, Jakarta, Indonesia	(China) Ge Fei	(China) Qin Yiyuan (China) Tang Yongshu	15–6, 15–12	Gold
1997	Among Rogo Sports Hall, Yogyakarta, Indonesia	(China) Ge Fei	(China) Qin Yiyuan (China) Tang Yongshu	15–10, 9–15, 15–9	Gold

Mixed doubles
Year	Venue	Partner	Opponent	Score	Result
1994	Phan Đình Phùng Indoor Stadium, Ho Chi Minh, Vietnam	(China) Chen Xingdong	(Denmark) Thomas Lund (Sweden) Catrine Bengtsson	15–10, 10–15, 2–15	Silver

=== Asian Games ===
Women's doubles
Year	Venue	Partner	Opponent	Score	Result
1994	Tsuru Memorial Gymnasium, Hiroshima, Japan	(China) Ge Fei	(South Korea) Chung So-young (South Korea) Gil Young-ah	15–9, 7–15, 10–15	Bronze
1998	Thammasat Gymnasium 2, Bangkok, Thailand	(China) Ge Fei	(Indonesia) Deyana Lomban (Indonesia) Eliza Nathanael	12–15, 15–9, 15–11	Gold

=== Asian Championships ===
Women's doubles
Year	Venue	Partner	Opponent	Score	Result
1994	Shanghai Gymnasium, Shanghai, China	(China) Ge Fei	(China) Chen Ying (China) Wu Yuhong	15–11, 18–14	Gold
1995	Olympic Sports Center Gymnasium, Beijing, China	(China) Ge Fei	(China) Qin Yiyuan (China) Tang Yongshu	15–1, 15–4	Gold
1998	Nimibutr Stadium, Bangkok, Thailand	(China) Ge Fei	(China) Qin Yiyuan (China) Tang Yongshu	15–8, 15–7	Gold
1999	Kuala Lumpur Badminton Stadium, Kuala Lumpur, Malaysia	(China) Ge Fei	(South Korea) Chung Jae-hee (South Korea) Ra Kyung-min	15–8, 15–10	Gold

=== Asian Cup ===
Women's doubles
Year	Venue	Partner	Opponent	Score	Result
1995	Xinxing Gymnasium, Qingdao, China	(China) Ge Fei	(South Korea) Gil Young-ah (South Korea) Jang Hye-ock	15–7, 18–17	Gold

=== World Junior Championships ===
The Bimantara World Junior Championships was an international invitation badminton tournament for junior players. It was held in Jakarta, Indonesia from 1987 to 1991.

Girls' doubles
Year	Venue	Partner	Opponent	Score	Result
1991	Istora Senayan, Jakarta, Indonesia	(China) Han Jingna	(Denmark) Rikke Olsen (Denmark) Mette Sørensen	15–5, 15–6	Gold
1992	Istora Senayan, Jakarta, Indonesia	(China) Han Jingna	(China) Tang Yongshu (China) Yuan Yali	15–9, 15–5	Gold

Mixed doubles
Year	Venue	Partner	Opponent	Score	Result
1992	Istora Senayan, Jakarta, Indonesia	(China) Liang Yongping	(South Korea) Kim Dong-moon (South Korea) Kim Shin-young		Bronze

=== IBF World Grand Prix (34 titles, 5 runners-up) ===
The World Badminton Grand Prix sanctioned by International Badminton Federation (IBF) from 1983 to 2006.

Women's doubles
Year	Tournament	Partner	Opponent	Score	Result
1993	Thailand Open	(China) Ge Fei	(China) Han Jingna (China) Li Qi	15–5, 15–10	(gold) Winner
1994	Malaysia Open	(China) Ge Fei	(Indonesia) Eliza Nathanael (Indonesia) Zelin Resiana	15–5, 15–11	(gold) Winner
1994	Singapore Open	(China) Ge Fei	(South Korea) Gil Young-ah (South Korea) Kim Mee-hyang	15–7, 18–16	(gold) Winner
1994	Thailand Open	(China) Ge Fei	(England) Julie Bradbury (England) Joanne Goode	15–12, 15–4	(gold) Winner
1994	Hong Kong Open	(China) Ge Fei	(South Korea) Jang Hye-ock (South Korea) Shim Eun-jung	11–15, 14–18	(silver) Runner-up
1994	China Open	(China) Ge Fei	(South Korea) Bang Soo-hyun (South Korea) Jang Hye-ock	15–8, 15–2	(gold) Winner
1994	World Grand Prix Finals	(China) Ge Fei	(Indonesia) Finarsih (Indonesia) Lili Tampi	13–15, 15–8, 15–7	(gold) Winner
1995	Korea Open	(China) Ge Fei	(South Korea) Gil Young-ah (South Korea) Jang Hye-ock	13–15, 15–1, 11–15	(silver) Runner-up
1995	Japan Open	(China) Ge Fei	(Indonesia) Finarsih (Indonesia) Lili Tampi	15–11, 15–8	(gold) Winner
1995	Indonesia Open	(China) Ge Fei	(China) Qin Yiyuan (China) Tang Yongshu	15–6, 15–6	(gold) Winner
1995	Singapore Open	(China) Ge Fei	(South Korea) Gil Young-ah (South Korea) Jang Hye-ock	15–12, 15–7	(gold) Winner
1995	Thailand Open	(China) Ge Fei	(South Korea) Gil Young-ah (South Korea) Jang Hye-ock	17–18, 6–15	(silver) Runner-up
1995	China Open	(China) Ge Fei	(South Korea) Gil Young-ah (South Korea) Jang Hye-ock	15–12, 10–15, 15–3	(gold) Winner
1995	World Grand Prix Finals	(China) Ge Fei	(South Korea) Gil Young-ah (South Korea) Jang Hye-ock	15–7, 15–12	(gold) Winner
1996	Chinese Taipei Open	(China) Ge Fei	(South Korea) Kim Mee-hyang (South Korea) Kim Shin-young	15–8, 15–13	(gold) Winner
1996	Japan Open	(China) Ge Fei	(South Korea) Gil Young-ah (South Korea) Jang Hye-ock	5–15, 17–14, 10–15	(silver) Runner-up
1996	All England Open	(China) Ge Fei	(Denmark) Helene Kirkegaard (Denmark) Rikke Olsen	15–3, 15–7	(gold) Winner
1996	World Grand Prix Finals	(China) Ge Fei	(Indonesia) Eliza Nathanael (Indonesia) Zelin Resiana	15–4, 15–4	(gold) Winner
1997	Japan Open	(China) Ge Fei	(Indonesia) Eliza Nathanael (Indonesia) Zelin Resiana	12–15, 15–12, 15–1	(gold) Winner
1997	Korea Open	(China) Ge Fei	(China) Qin Yiyuan (China) Tang Yongshu	15–10, 15–10	(gold) Winner
1997	All England Open	(China) Ge Fei	(Indonesia) Eliza Nathanael (Indonesia) Zelin Resiana	15–6, 15–9	(gold) Winner
1997	Swiss Open	(China) Ge Fei	(China) Han Jingna (China) Ye Zhaoying	9–15, 15–2, 15–11	(gold) Winner
1997	Malaysia Open	(China) Ge Fei	(China) Liu Lu (China) Qian Hong	15–7, 15–1	(gold) Winner
1997	Singapore Open	(China) Ge Fei	(Indonesia) Indarti Issolina (Indonesia) Deyana Lomban	15–4, 15–9	(gold) Winner
1997	China Open	(China) Ge Fei	(China) Qin Yiyuan (China) Tang Yongshu	15–13, 15–11	(gold) Winner
1997	World Grand Prix Finals	(China) Ge Fei	(China) Qin Yiyuan (China) Tang Yongshu	15–1, 15–8	(gold) Winner
1998	Japan Open	(China) Ge Fei	(China) Qin Yiyuan (China) Tang Yongshu	Walkover	(gold) Winner
1998	All England Open	(China) Ge Fei	(South Korea) Jang Hye-ock (South Korea) Ra Kyung-min	15–7, 15–7	(gold) Winner
1998	Swiss Open	(China) Ge Fei	(Denmark) Rikke Olsen (Denmark) Marlene Thomsen	15–7, 15–4	(gold) Winner
1998	Singapore Open	(China) Ge Fei	(China) Qin Yiyuan (China) Tang Yongshu	15–8, 15–13	(gold) Winner
1998	World Grand Prix Finals	(China) Ge Fei	(Denmark) Rikke Olsen (Denmark) Marlene Thomsen	Walkover	(gold) Winner
1999	Japan Open	(China) Ge Fei	(China) Huang Nanyan (China) Yang Wei	12–15, 17–16, 15–5	(gold) Winner
1999	Malaysia Open	(China) Ge Fei	(China) Gao Ling (China) Qin Yiyuan	15–8, 15–10	(gold) Winner
1999	China Open	(China) Ge Fei	(China) Gao Ling (China) Qin Yiyuan	15–5, 15–6	(gold) Winner
1999	World Grand Prix Finals	(China) Ge Fei	(South Korea) Chung Jae-hee (South Korea) Ra Kyung-min	15–2, 15–4	(gold) Winner
2000	All England Open	(China) Ge Fei	(South Korea) Chung Jae-hee (South Korea) Ra Kyung-min	15–5, 15–3	(gold) Winner
2000	Japan Open	(China) Ge Fei	(China) Huang Nanyan (China) Yang Wei	15–13, 4–15, 11–15	(silver) Runner-up
2000	Thailand Open	(China) Ge Fei	(China) Huang Nanyan (China) Yang Wei	15–8, 15–11	(gold) Winner
2000	Malaysia Open	(China) Ge Fei	(China) Huang Nanyan (China) Yang Wei	15–17, 15–6, 15–8	(gold) Winner

=== IBF International (1 title, 1 runners-up) ===
Women's singles
Year	Tournament	Opponent	Score	Result
1993	Wimbledon International	(China) Ge Fei	4–11, 6–11	(silver) Runner-up

Women's doubles
Year	Tournament	Partner	Opponent	Score	Result
1993	Wimbledon International	(China) Ge Fei	(Netherlands) Erica van den Heuvel (Netherlands) Nicole van Hooren	15–5, 15–6	(gold) Winner

== Performance timeline ==
Key

W	Won	F	Finalist	SF	Semi-finalist
QF	Quarter-finalist	#R	Rounds 4, 3, 2, 1	RR	Round-robin stage
Q#	Qualification round	A	Absent	w/d	Withdrew
G	Gold	S	Silver	B	Bronze
NH	Not held	N/A	Not applicable	DNQ	Did not qualify

=== National team ===
- Senior level

Team events	1994	1995	1996	1997	1998	1999	2000
Uber Cup	S	NH	S	NH	G	NH	G
Sudirman Cup	NH	G	NH	G	NH	G	NH
Asian Games	B	NH			G	NH	

=== Individual competitions ===
==== Junior level ====
- Girls' doubles

Events	1991	1992
World Jr Invitational Championships	G	NH
World Junior Championships	NH	G

- Mixed doubles

Events	1992
World Junior Championships	B

==== Senior level ====
- Women's singles

Tournaments	1991	1992	1993
China Open	3R	A	1R
Thailand Open	A		3R
Wimbledon Open	A		F

- Women's doubles

Tournaments	1994	1995	1996	1997	1998	1999	2000
Olympic Games	NH		G	NH			G
World Championships	NH	QF	NH	G	NH	G	NH
World Cup			G	G	NH		
Asian Games	B	NH			G	NH	
Asian Championships	G	G	A		G	G	A
Asian Cup		G		NH			

Tournaments	1991	1992	1993	1994	1995	1996	1997	1998	1999	2000
Year-end finals				W	W	W	W	W	W	A
China Open	2R	2R	QF	W	W	2R	W	NH	W	NH
Japan Open	A				W	F	W	W	W	F
All England Open	A			2R	A	W	W	W	wd	W
Malaysia Open	A			W	A		W	A	W	W
Singapore Open	A		NH	W	W	NH	W	W	A	NH
Thailand Open	A		W	W	F	A		NH	A	W
Korea Open	A				F	A	W	NH	A	
Swiss Open	A						W	W	A	
Chinese Taipei Open	A					W	A	NH	A	
Hong Kong Open	A			F	A					NH
Indonesia Open	A				W	A				
US Open	A				SF	A				
Wimbledon Open	A		W	A		NH				

- Mixed doubles

Tournaments	1994	1995	1996	1997
World Championships	NH	A	NH	3R
World Cup	S		A	
Asian Games	QF	NH		
Asian Championships	QF	A		

Tournaments	1992	1993	1994	1995	1996	1997	1998
All England Open	A		1R	A		SF	A
China Open	1R	2R	A		QF	A	NH
Japan Open	A					2R	A
Korea Open	A					2R	NH
Malaysia Open	A		2R	A			
Singapore Open	A	NH	QF	A	NH	wd	A
Swiss Open	A					2R	2R
Thailand Open	A	2R	A				NH
Wimbledon Open	A	2R	A		NH		
