= 1994 Singapore Open =

Tournament details
- Dates: 11 July 1994– 17 July 1994
- Edition: 47th
- Level: World Grand Prix 4 Stars
- Total prize money: US$90,000
- Venue: Singapore Indoor Stadium
- Location: Kallang, Singapore

Champions
- Men's singles: (Indonesia) Ardy Wiranata
- Women's singles: (South Korea) Ra Kyung-min
- Men's doubles: (Indonesia) Rexy Mainaky (Indonesia) Ricky Subagja
- Women's doubles: (China) Ge Fei (China) Gu Jun
- Mixed doubles: (Denmark) Thomas Lund (Denmark) Marlene Thomsen

The 1994 Singapore Open (also known as the Konica Cup) was a four-star badminton tournament that took place at the Singapore Indoor Stadium in Singapore, from July 11 to July 17, 1994. The total prize money on offer was US$90,000.

== Final results ==
Category	Winners	Runners-up	Score
Men's singles	(Indonesia) Ardy Wiranata	(Indonesia) Hermawan Susanto	15–10, 4–15, 15–9
Women's singles	(South Korea) Ra Kyung-min	(Indonesia) Yuliani Santosa	12–9, 11–5
Men's doubles	(Indonesia) Rexy Mainaky & Ricky Subagja	(Denmark) Jon Holst-Christensen & Thomas Lund	15–6, 15–8
Women's doubles	(China) Ge Fei & Gu Jun	(South Korea) Gil Young-ah & Kim Mee-hyang	15–7, 18–16
Mixed doubles	(Denmark) Thomas Lund & Marlene Thomsen	(Denmark) Jon Holst-Christensen & Rikke Olsen	15–1, 18–15
