= Marlene Thomsen =

Danish badminton player

Personal information
- Born: 5 May 1971 (age 55) Vejle, Syddanmark, Denmark
- Height: 1.75 m (5 ft 9 in)

Sport
- Country: Denmark
- Sport: Badminton
- Handedness: Left

Women and Mixed Doubles
- Highest ranking: 1 (XD with Thomas Lund) (23 January 1995)
- BWF profile
Medal record
Women's badminton
Representing Denmark
World Championships
Gold medal – first place	1995 Lausanne	Mixed doubles
Silver medal – second place	1997 Glasgow	Mixed doubles
Sudirman Cup
Silver medal – second place	1999 Copenhagen	Mixed team
Bronze medal – third place	1993 Birmingham	Mixed team
Bronze medal – third place	1995 Lausanne	Mixed team
Bronze medal – third place	1997 Glasgow	Mixed team
Uber Cup
Bronze medal – third place	1996 Hong Kong	Women's team
Bronze medal – third place	1998 Hong Kong	Women's team
European Championships
Gold medal – first place	1996 Herning	Women's doubles
Gold medal – first place	1998 Sofia	Women's doubles
Silver medal – second place	1992 Glasgow	Women's doubles
European Mixed Team Championships
Gold medal – first place	1996 Herning	Mixed team
Gold medal – first place	1998 Sofia	Mixed team
Silver medal – second place	1992 Glasgow	Mixed team
European Junior Championships
Gold medal – first place	1989 Manchester	Girls' doubles
Gold medal – first place	1989 Manchester	Mixed doubles
Gold medal – first place	1987 Warsaw	Mixed team
Gold medal – first place	1989 Manchester	Mixed team
Bronze medal – third place	1987 Warsaw	Girls' doubles

Marlene Thomsen (born 5 May 1971) is a former badminton player from Denmark.

== Career ==
Thomsen is a world-class level player in badminton especially in mixed doubles during the 90's decade. Thomsen managed to win the 1995 World Badminton Championships with her pair, Thomas Lund and grabbed another silver in 1997 World Badminton Championships with another pair, Jens Eriksen in that category. Thomsen is also a 3 times Denmark Open winners and won the illustrious All England Open in 1995. When she lost in Denmark Open quarterfinal mixed doubles against Simon Archer and Joanne Goode from England, She immediately retired from the sport due to broken bones in her foot.

=== 1992 Summer Olympics ===
Thomsen competed in badminton at the 1992 Summer Olympics in women's doubles with Lisbet Stuer-Lauridsen. In the first round, they defeated Denyse Julien and Doris Piche of Canada 15–7, 15–7. In the second round, the eventual silver medalist, Guan Weizhen and Nong Qunhua of China, beat them 15–3, 15–12.

=== 1996 Summer Olympics ===
She also competed in badminton at the 1996 Summer Olympics in women's doubles with Lisbet Stuer-Lauridsen. In the first round, they defeated Linda French and Erika von Heiland of the United States and in the second round Chung Jae-hee and Park Soo-yun of Korea. In quarterfinals they lost against Qin Yiyuan and Tang Yongshu of China 15–8, 15–3.

== Personal life ==
Thomsen is married to her number 1 mixed doubles partner, the hall of famer Thomas Lund himself who works as the Secretary General of BWF.

== Major achievements ==
=== World Championships ===
Mixed doubles
Year	Venue	Partner	Opponent	Score	Result
1995	Malley Sports Centre, Lausanne, Switzerland	(Denmark) Thomas Lund	(Denmark) Jens Eriksen (Denmark) Helene Kirkegaard	15–6, 15–2	Gold
1997	Scotstoun Centre, Glasgow, Scotland	(Denmark) Jens Eriksen	(China) Liu Yong (China) Ge Fei	5–15, 17–16, 4–15	Silver

=== European Championships ===
Women's doubles
Year	Venue	Partner	Opponent	Score	Result
1992	Kelvin Hall International Sports Arena, Glasgow, Scotland	(Denmark) Lisbet Stuer-Lauridsen	(Sweden) Lim Xiaoqing (Sweden) Christine Magnusson	15–8, 11–15, 6–15	Silver
1996	Herning Badminton Klub, Herning, Denmark	(Denmark) Lisbet Stuer-Lauridsen	(Denmark) Rikke Olsen (Denmark) Helene Kirkegaard	6–15, 15–12, 15–10	Gold
1998	Winter Sports Palace, Sofia, Bulgaria	(Denmark) Rikke Olsen	(Denmark) Majken Vange (Denmark) Ann Jørgensen	15–2, 15–10	Gold

=== European Junior Championships ===
Girls' doubles
Year	Venue	Partner	Opponent	Score	Result
1987	Hali Mery, Warsaw, Poland	(Denmark) Trine Johansson	(England) Tracy Dineen (England) Julie Munday	13–15, 13–15	Bronze
1989	Armitage Centre, Manchester, England	(Denmark) Trine Johansson	(Denmark) Helene Kirkegaard (Denmark) Camilla Martin	15–5, 13–15, 15–5	Gold

Mixed doubles
Year	Venue	Partner	Opponent	Score	Result
1989	Armitage Centre, Manchester, England	(Denmark) Christian Jakobsen	(England) William Mellersh (England) Joanne Goode	18–14, 15–2	Gold

=== IBF World Grand Prix (24 titles, 25 runners-up) ===
The World Badminton Grand Prix was sanctioned by the International Badminton Federation (IBF) from 1983 to 2006.

Women's doubles
Year	Tournament	Partner	Opponent	Score	Result
1992	Finnish Open	(Denmark) Lisbet Stuer-Lauridsen	(Russia) Natalya Ivanova (Russia) Elena Rybkina	15–7, 15–9	(gold) Winner
1993	Finnish Open	(Denmark) Camilla Martin	(Russia) Marina Andrievskaya (Russia) Marina Yakusheva	15–1, 15–3	(gold) Winner
1993	Swiss Open	(Denmark) Anne-Mette van Dijk	(Denmark) Lotte Olsen (Denmark) Lisbet Stuer-Lauridsen	6–15, 15–3, 4–15	(silver) Runner-up
1993	Scottish Open	(Denmark) Anne-Mette van Dijk	(Denmark) Lotte Olsen (Denmark) Lisbet Stuer-Lauridsen	15–11, 10–15, 7–15	(silver) Runner-up
1994	German Open	(Denmark) Anne-Mette van Dijk	(China) Zhang Jin (China) Peng Xinyong	11–15, 5–15	(silver) Runner-up
1994	Denmark Open	(Denmark) Anne-Mette van Dijk	(Sweden) Christine Magnusson (Sweden) Lim Xiaoqing	12–15, 15–7, 2–15	(silver) Runner-up
1995	Swiss Open	(Denmark) Anne-Mette van Dijk	(Denmark) Helene Kirkegaard (Denmark) Rikke Olsen	15–10, 5–15, 14–17	(silver) Runner-up
1995	Denmark Open	(Denmark) Lisbet Stuer-Lauridsen	(Denmark) Helene Kirkegaard (Denmark) Rikke Olsen	15–11, 15–11	(gold) Winner
1996	Swiss Open	(Denmark) Lisbet Stuer-Lauridsen	(Denmark) Helene Kirkegaard (Denmark) Rikke Olsen	15–10, 15–10	(gold) Winner
1996	Malaysia Open	(Denmark) Lisbet Stuer-Lauridsen	(China) Liu Lu (China) Qian Hong	10–15, 17–15, 17–15	(gold) Winner
1996	Hong Kong Open	(Denmark) Lisbet Stuer-Lauridsen	(Indonesia) Indarti Issolina (Indonesia) Deyana Lomban	15–9, 15–12	(gold) Winner
1996	Thailand Open	(Denmark) Lisbet Stuer-Lauridsen	(Indonesia) Indarti Issolina (Indonesia) Deyana Lomban	9–15, 4–15	(silver) Runner-up
1997	German Open	(Denmark) Lisbet Stuer-Lauridsen	(Denmark) Helene Kirkegaard (Denmark) Rikke Olsen	15–4, 5–15, 8–15	(silver) Runner-up
1998	Swiss Open	(Denmark) Rikke Olsen	(China) Ge Fei (China) Gu Jun	7–15, 4–15	(silver) Runner-up
1998	Malaysia Open	(Denmark) Rikke Olsen	(Indonesia) Eliza Nathanael (Indonesia) Zelin Resiana	15–8, 15–4	(gold) Winner
1998	Brunei Open	(Denmark) Rikke Olsen	(China) Huang Nanyan (China) Yang Wei	11–15, 14–17	(silver) Runner-up
1998	Indonesia Open	(Denmark) Rikke Olsen	(Indonesia) Eliza Nathanael (Indonesia) Deyana Lomban	15–7, 15–17, 7–15	(silver) Runner-up
1998	World Grand Prix Finals	(Denmark) Rikke Olsen	(China) Ge Fei (China) Gu Jun	Walkover	(silver) Runner-up

Mixed doubles
Year	Tournament	Partner	Opponent	Score	Result
1990	Denmark Open	(Denmark) Henrik Svarrer	(Denmark) Thomas Lund (Denmark) Pernille Dupont	4–15, 10–15	(silver) Runner-up
1990	Dutch Open	(Denmark) Henrik Svarrer	(Sweden) Pär-Gunnar Jönsson (Sweden) Maria Bengtsson	15–13, 15–11	(gold) Winner
1992	Chinese Taipei Open	(Denmark) Henrik Svarrer	(Sweden) Pär-Gunnar Jönsson (Sweden) Maria Bengtsson	6–15, 15–17	(silver) Runner-up
1992	Finnish Open	(Denmark) Max Gandrup	(Denmark) Jan Paulsen (England) Fiona Smith	17–15, 8–15, 15–12	(gold) Winner
1993	Japan Open	(Denmark) Christian Jakobsen	(Denmark) Thomas Lund (Sweden) Catrine Bengtsson	6–15, 6–15	(silver) Runner-up
1993	Finnish Open	(Denmark) Christian Jakobsen	(Sweden) Jan-Eric Antonsson (Sweden) Astrid Crabo	10–15, 11–15	(silver) Runner-up
1994	Chinese Taipei Open	(Sweden) Peter Axelsson	(Denmark) Michael Sogaard (England) Gillian Gowers	14–18, 10–15	(silver) Runner-up
1994	Korea Open	(Sweden) Peter Axelsson	(Denmark) Michael Sogaard (England) Gillian Gowers	12–15, 9–15	(silver) Runner-up
1994	Swiss Open	(Sweden) Peter Axelsson	(Denmark) Jon Holst-Christensen (Sweden) Catrine Bengtsson	18–13, 15–9	(gold) Winner
1994	Singapore Open	(Denmark) Thomas Lund	(Denmark) Jon Holst-Christensen (Denmark) Rikke Olsen	15–4, 15–4	(gold) Winner
1994	German Open	(Denmark) Thomas Lund	(Sweden) Jan-Eric Antonsson (Sweden) Astrid Crabo	14–18, 15–7, 15–8	(gold) Winner
1994	Denmark Open	(Denmark) Thomas Lund	(England) Simon Archer (England) Julie Bradbury	15–8, 15–3	(gold) Winner
1994	Hong Kong Open	(Denmark) Thomas Lund	(South Korea) Ha Tae-kwon (South Korea) Shim Eun-jung	17–14, 15–12	(gold) Winner
1994	China Open	(Denmark) Thomas Lund	(Denmark) Michael Sogaard (England) Gillian Gowers	15–3, 15–8	(gold) Winner
1994	World Grand Prix Finals	(Denmark) Thomas Lund	(Sweden) Jan-Eric Antonsson (Sweden) Astrid Crabo	15–4, 15–9	(gold) Winner
1995	Korea Open	(Denmark) Thomas Lund	(China) Liu Jianjun (China) Ge Fei	15–4, 18–15	(gold) Winner
1995	Japan Open	(Denmark) Thomas Lund	(Indonesia) Tri Kusharjanto (Indonesia) Minarti Timur	15–4, 14–17, 15–10	(gold) Winner
1995	Swiss Open	(Denmark) Thomas Lund	(Denmark) Jon Holst-Christensen (Denmark) Rikke Olsen	15–11, 18–14	(gold) Winner
1995	All England Open	(Denmark) Thomas Lund	(Denmark) Jon Holst-Christensen (Denmark) Rikke Olsen	15–7, 15–7	(gold) Winner
1995	Russian Open	(Denmark) Jens Eriksen	(England) Chris Hunt (England) Gillian Gowers	15–3, 18–16	(gold) Winner
1996	Hong Kong Open	(Denmark) Jens Eriksen	(Denmark) Michael Søgaard (Denmark) Rikke Olsen	8–15, 11–15	(silver) Runner-up
1997	Japan Open	(Denmark) Jens Eriksen	(China) Liu Yong (China) Ge Fei	8–15, 10–15	(silver) Runner-up
1997	Korea Open	(Denmark) Jens Eriksen	(China) Liu Yong (China) Ge Fei	13–15, 5–15	(silver) Runner-up
1997	Malaysia Open	(Denmark) Jens Eriksen	(China) Liu Yong (China) Ge Fei	12–15, 12–15	(silver) Runner-up
1997	German Open	(Denmark) Jens Eriksen	(Denmark) Michael Søgaard (Denmark) Rikke Olsen	15–11, 12–15, 15–6	(gold) Winner
1997	Denmark Open	(Denmark) Jens Eriksen	(Denmark) Michael Søgaard (Denmark) Rikke Olsen	15–6, 18–14	(gold) Winner
1997	Thailand Open	(Denmark) Jens Eriksen	(Denmark) Michael Søgaard (Denmark) Rikke Olsen	5–15, 3–15	(silver) Runner-up
1998	Japan Open	(Denmark) Jens Eriksen	(South Korea) Kim Dong-moon (South Korea) Ra Kyung-min	12–15, 9–15	(silver) Runner-up
1998	Swiss Open	(Denmark) Jens Eriksen	(Denmark) Michael Søgaard (Denmark) Rikke Olsen	18–13, 8–15, 3–15	(silver) Runner-up
1998	Brunei Open	(Denmark) Jens Eriksen	(Denmark) Michael Søgaard (Denmark) Rikke Olsen	15–13, 15–6	(gold) Winner
1999	German Open	(Denmark) Janek Roos	(Denmark) Lars Paaske (Denmark) Jane F. Bramsen	10–15, 11–15	(silver) Runner-up

=== IBF International (8 titles, 2 runners-up) ===
Women's doubles
Year	Tournament	Partner	Opponent	Score	Result
1990	Czech International	(Denmark) Trine Johansson	(Denmark) Helene Kirkegaard (Denmark) Camilla Martin	17–14, 15–8	(gold) Winner
1992	Amor Tournament	(Denmark) Lisbet Stuer-Lauridsen	(Germany) Katrin Schmidt (Germany) Kerstin Ubben	10–15, 15–13, 15–3	(gold) Winner
1992	Nordic Championships	(Denmark) Lotte Olsen	(Sweden) Lim Xiaoqing (Sweden) Christine Magnusson	6–15, 13–15	(silver) Runner-up
1993	Hamburg Cup	(Denmark) Anne-Mette van Dijk	(England) Joanne Davies (England) Joanne Goode	15–11, 15–7	(gold) Winner
1994	Hamburg Cup	(Denmark) Anne-Mette van Dijk	(Denmark) Helene Kirkegaard (Denmark) Rikke Olsen	15–11, 15–12	(gold) Winner

Mixed doubles
Year	Tournament	Partner	Opponent	Score	Result
1990	Polish Open	(Denmark) Christian Jakobsen	(Poland) Jerzy Dolhan (Poland) Bozena Haracz	15–5, 10–15, 18–16	(gold) Winner
1990	Czech International	(Denmark) Christian Jakobsen	(Denmark) Peter Christensen (Denmark) Trine Johansson	17–14, 15–4	(gold) Winner
1992	Amor Tournament	(Denmark) Jens Eriksen	(Netherlands) Ron Michels (Netherlands) Sonja Mellink	9–15, 10–15	(silver) Runner-up
1993	Hamburg Cup	(Denmark) Christian Jakobsen	(Denmark) Jens Eriksen (Denmark) Anne-Mette van Dijk	10–15, 15–13, 15–11	(gold) Winner
1994	Hamburg Cup	(Denmark) Thomas Lund	(Denmark) Christian Jakobsen (Denmark) Lotte Olsen	15–8, 15–6	(gold) Winner
