= Qian Hong (badminton) =

Chinese badminton player

Qian Hong 钱虹
Personal information
- Born: 13 June 1976 (age 50) Jiangsu, China
- Height: 1.70 m (5 ft 7 in)

Sport
- Country: China
- Sport: Badminton
- Handedness: Right

Women'& mixed doubles
- Highest ranking: 4 (WD January 1998)
- BWF profile
Medal record
Women's badminton
Representing China
World Championships
Bronze medal – third place	1997 Glasgow	Women's doubles
Uber Cup
Gold medal – first place	1998 Hong Kong	Women's team
Asian Championships
Silver medal – second place	1997 Kuala Lumpur	Women's doubles
Silver medal – second place	1997 Kuala Lumpur	Mixed doubles
World Junior Championships
Gold medal – first place	1994 Kuala Lumpur	Mixed doubles
Silver medal – second place	1994 Kuala Lumpur	Girls' doubles

Qian Hong (simplified Chinese: 钱虹; traditional Chinese: 錢虹; pinyin: Qián Hóng; born 13 June 1976) is a former Chinese badminton player. She was part of the national team that clinched an Uber Cup in 1998 Hong Kong. In the individual events, she participated at the 1994 World Junior Championships clinched a gold medal in the mixed doubles event partnered with Zhang Wei, and a silver medal in the girls' doubles event with Wang Li. Teamed-up with Liu Lu, she won the women's doubles title at the 1996 Scottish Open, and 1997 Swedish Open. At the 1997 Asian Championships, she won two silver medals in the mixed and women's doubles event, and also settled for a bronze medal at the World Championships in the women's doubles event.

== Achievements ==
=== BWF World Championships ===
Women's doubles
Year	Venue	Partner	Opponent	Score	Result
1997	Scotstoun Centre; Glasgow, Scotland	(China) Liu Lu	(China) Ge Fei (China) Gu Jun	3–15, 3–15	Bronze

=== Asian Championships ===
Women's doubles
Year	Venue	Partner	Opponent	Score	Result
1997	Kuala Lumpur, Malaysia	(China) Liu Lu	(China) Liu Zhong (China) Huang Nanyan	15–12, 14–17, 6–15	Silver

Mixed doubles
Year	Venue	Partner	Opponent	Score	Result
1997	Kuala Lumpur, Malaysia	(China) Yang Ming	(China) Zhang Jun (China) Liu Lu	12–15, 16–17, 0–15	Silver

=== World Junior Championships ===
Girls' doubles
Year	Venue	Partner	Opponent	Score	Result
1994	Kuala Lumpur Badminton Stadium; Kuala Lumpur, Malaysia	(China) Wang Li	(China) Yao Jie (China) Liu Lu	16–17, 15–7, 7–15	Silver

Mixed doubles
Year	Venue	Partner	Opponent	Score	Result
1994	Kuala Lumpur Badminton Stadium; Kuala Lumpur, Malaysia	(China) Zhang Wei	(China) Yang Bing (China) Yao Jie	15–8, 15–6	Gold

=== IBF World Grand Prix ===
The World Badminton Grand Prix sanctioned by International Badminton Federation (IBF) since 1983.

Women's doubles
Year	Tournament	Partner	Opponent	Score	Result
1998	Hong Kong Open	(China) Liu Lu	(China) Chen Lin (China) Jiang Xuelian	4–15, 11–15	(silver) Runner-up
1997	Hong Kong Open	(China) Liu Lu	(South Korea) Chung Jae-hee (South Korea) Ra Kyung-min	7–15, 12–15	(silver) Runner-up
1997	Malaysia Open	(China) Liu Lu	(China) Ge Fei (China) Gu Jun	7–15, 1–15	(silver) Runner-up
1997	Swedish Open	(China) Liu Lu	(England) Julie Bradbury (England) Donna Kellogg	15–11, 17–18, 15–11	(gold) Winner
1996	Malaysia Open	(China) Liu Lu	(Denmark) Lisbeth Stuer-Lauridsen (Denmark) Marlene Thomsen	15–10, 14–17, 16–17	(silver) Runner-up

=== IBF International ===
Women's doubles
Year	Tournament	Partner	Opponent	Score	Result
2001	Singapore International	(China) Ge Fei	(China) Gao Qian (China) Huang Lipei	15–3, 15–3	(gold) Winner
2000	French International	(China) Xu Li	(Japan) Naomi Murakami (Japan) Hiromi Yamada	15–4, 6–15, 15–8	(gold) Winner
1996	Scottish Open	(China) Liu Lu	(England) Joanne Goode (England) Gillian Gowers	8–15, 15–3, 15–5	(gold) Winner
