= 1997 Singapore Open =

Tournament details
- Dates: 21 July 1997– 27 July 1997
- Edition: 49th
- Level: World Grand Prix 5 Stars
- Total prize money: US$170,000
- Venue: Singapore Indoor Stadium
- Location: Kallang, Singapore

Champions
- Men's singles: (Indonesia) Hariyanto Arbi
- Women's singles: (Indonesia) Mia Audina
- Men's doubles: (Indonesia) Sigit Budiarto (Indonesia) Candra Wijaya
- Women's doubles: (China) Ge Fei (China) Gu Jun
- Mixed doubles: (Indonesia) Bambang Suprianto (Indonesia) Rosalina Riseu

The 1997 Singapore Open (also known as the Konica Cup) was a five-star badminton tournament that took place at the Singapore Indoor Stadium in Singapore, from July 21 to July 27, 1997. The total prize money on offer was US$170,000.

== Final results ==
Category	Winners	Runners-up	Score
Men's singles	(Indonesia) Hariyanto Arbi	(Indonesia) Indra Wijaya	3–15, 18–14, 15–9
Women's singles	(Indonesia) Mia Audina	(China) Gong Zhichao	11–6, 11–6
Men's doubles	(Indonesia) Sigit Budiarto & Candra Wijaya	(South Korea) Lee Dong-soo & Yoo Yong-sung	15–8, 15–10
Women's doubles	(China) Ge Fei & Gu Jun	(Indonesia) Indarti Issolina & Deyana Lomban	15–4, 15–9
Mixed doubles	(Indonesia) Bambang Suprianto & Rosalina Riseu	(South Korea) Kim Dong-moon & Park So-yun	15–13, 15–9
