= 1994 World Badminton Grand Prix Finals =

Tournament details
- Dates: 7–11 December
- Edition: 12
- Total prize money: US$300,000
- Location: Bangkok, Thailand

The 1994 World Badminton Grand Prix was the 12th edition of the World Badminton Grand Prix finals. It was held in Bangkok, Thailand, from December 7 to December 11, 1994.

== Final results ==
Category	Winners	Runners-up	Score
Men's singles	(Indonesia) Ardy Wiranata	(Indonesia) Alan Budi Kusuma	9–15, 15–7, 15–5
Women's singles	(Indonesia) Susi Susanti	(China) Ye Zhaoying	4–11, 12–10, 11–4
Men's doubles	(Indonesia) Ricky Subagja & Rexy Mainaky	(Indonesia) Rudy Gunawan & Bambang Suprianto	15–10, 15–7
Women's doubles	(China) Ge Fei & Gu Jun	(Indonesia) Finarsih & Lili Tampi	13–15, 15–8, 15–7
Mixed doubles	(Denmark) Thomas Lund & Marlene Thomsen	(Sweden) Jan-Eric Antonsson & Astrid Crabo	15–4, 15–9
