= 1992 IBF World Junior Championships =

Tournament details
- Dates: 8-14 November 1992
- Edition: 1st
- Level: International
- Venue: Istora Senayan
- Location: Jakarta, Indonesia

The 1992 IBF World Junior Championships was an international badminton tournament held at Istora Senayan in Jakarta, Indonesia from 8 to 14 November 1992.

== Medalists ==
Event	Gold	Silver	Bronze
Boys singles	(China) Sun Jun	(Indonesia) George Rimarcdi	(Indonesia) Michael Tedjakusuma
Boys singles	(China) Sun Jun	(Indonesia) George Rimarcdi	(Indonesia) Setiadi Hartono
Girls singles	(Indonesia) Kristin Yunita	(China) Yao Yan	(Indonesia) Mia Audina
Girls singles	(Indonesia) Kristin Yunita	(China) Yao Yan	(China) Fan Linhua
Boys doubles	(Indonesia) Amon Sunaryo (Indonesia) Kusno	(Indonesia) Namrih Suroto (Indonesia) Sigit Budiarto	(China) Liu Yong (China) Yu Jinhao
Boys doubles	(Indonesia) Amon Sunaryo (Indonesia) Kusno	(Indonesia) Namrih Suroto (Indonesia) Sigit Budiarto	(South Korea) Hwang Sun-ho (South Korea) Kim Dong-moon
Girls doubles	(China) Gu Jun (China) Han Jingna	(China) Tang Yongshu (China) Yuan Yali	(Indonesia) Rosalia Anastasia (Indonesia) Iin Indarwati
Girls doubles	(China) Gu Jun (China) Han Jingna	(China) Tang Yongshu (China) Yuan Yali	(Indonesia) Mia Audina (Indonesia) Indarti Issolina
Mixed doubles	(Denmark) Jim Laugesen (Denmark) Rikke Olsen	(South Korea) Kim Dong-moon (South Korea) Kim Shin-young	(Indonesia) Chandra Wijaya (Indonesia) Susi Chusnul
Mixed doubles	(Denmark) Jim Laugesen (Denmark) Rikke Olsen	(South Korea) Kim Dong-moon (South Korea) Kim Shin-young	(China) Liang Yongping (China) Gu Jun

== Individual competition ==
=== Finals ===
Category	Winners	Runners-up	Score
Men's singles	Sun Jun	George Rimarcdi	15–9, 15–11
Women's singles	Kristin Yunita	Yao Yan	12–11, 11–1
Men's doubles	Amon Sunaryo / Kusno	Namrih Suroto / Sigit Budiarto	15–11, 12–15, 15–12
Women's doubles	Gu Jun / Han Jingna	Tang Yongshu / Yuan Yali	15–9, 15–5
Mixed doubles	Jim Laugesen / Rikke Olsen	Kim Dong-moon / Kim Shin-young	15–11, 18–17

=== Semifinals ===
Category	Winners	Opponent	Score
Men's singles	Sun Jun	Michael Tedjakusuma	15–11, 15–5
Men's singles	George Rimarcdi	Setiadi Hartono	17–15, 17–18, 15–6
Women's singles	Kristin Yunita	Mia Audina	11–9, 11–5
Women's singles	Yao Yan	Fan Linhua	11–6, 12–9
Men's doubles	Amon Sunaryo / Kusno	Liu Yong / Yu Jinhao	15–3, 12–15, 15–11
Men's doubles	Namrih Suroto / Sigit Budiarto	Hwang Sun-ho / Kim Dong-moon	8–15, 18–17, 15–2
Women's doubles	Gu Jun / Han Jingna	Rosalia Anastasia / Iin Indarwati	15–7, 15–3
Women's doubles	Tang Yongshu / Yuan Yali	Mia Audina / Indarti Issolina	15–6, 15–9
Mixed doubles	Jim Laugesen / Rikke Olsen	Chandra Wijaya / Susi Chusnul	15–13, 17–15
Mixed doubles	Kim Dong-moon / Kim Shin-young	Liang Yongping / Gu Jun	18–14, 15–5
