= Badminton at the 1998 Asian Games – Women's doubles =

Women's doubles at the 1998 Asian Games
- Venue: Thammasat Gymnasium 2
- Dates: 13–17 December
- Competitors: 32 from 9 nations

Medalists
gold medal	Ge Fei; Gu Jun	China
silver medal	Eliza Nathanael; Deyana Lomban	Indonesia
bronze medal	Ra Kyung-min; Chung Jae-hee	South Korea
bronze medal	Qin Yiyuan; Tang Hetian	China

The badminton women's doubles tournament at the 1998 Asian Games in Bangkok took place from 13 December to 17 December at Thammasat Gymnasium 2.

The Chinese duo of Ge Fei and Gu Jun won the gold in this tournament.

== Schedule ==
All times are Indochina Time (UTC+07:00)

Date	Time	Event
Sunday, 13 December 1998	13:00	1st round
Monday, 14 December 1998	13:00	1st round
Tuesday, 15 December 1998	13:00	Quarterfinals
Wednesday, 16 December 1998	13:00	Semifinals
Thursday, 17 December 1998	13:00	Final

== Results ==
Legend

- WO — Won by walkover

1st round
1	Ge Fei (CHN); Gu Jun (CHN)	15	15
Chan Ya-lin (TPE); Huang Chia-chi (TPE)	3	0
Carmelita (INA); Indarti Issolina (INA)	W	O
Amparo Lim (PHI); Kennie Asuncion (PHI)
4	Yoshiko Iwata (JPN); Haruko Matsuda (JPN)	15	15
Nusharee Teekatakul (THA); Nujarin Teekatakul (THA)	10	4
Joanne Quay (MAS); Law Pei Pei (MAS)	2	4
Ra Kyung-min (KOR); Chung Jae-hee (KOR)	15	15
Kim Shin-young (KOR); Yim Kyung-jin (KOR)	9	4
Tsai Hui-min (TPE); Chen Li-chin (TPE)	15	15
Yasuko Mizui (JPN); Saori Ito (JPN)	7	4
3	Eliza Nathanael (INA); Deyana Lomban (INA)	15	15
Sathinee Chankrachangwong (THA); Mathinee Naraweerawut (THA)	15	15
Lim Pek Siah (MAS); Chor Hooi Yee (MAS)	4	8
Ng Ching (HKG); Elyni Jie (HKG)	2	2
2	Qin Yiyuan (CHN); Tang Hetian (CHN)	15	15

Quarterfinals
1	Ge Fei (CHN); Gu Jun (CHN)	15	15
Carmelita (INA); Indarti Issolina (INA)	9	3
4	Yoshiko Iwata (JPN); Haruko Matsuda (JPN)	3	7
Ra Kyung-min (KOR); Chung Jae-hee (KOR)	15	15
Tsai Hui-min (TPE); Chen Li-chin (TPE)	8	12
3	Eliza Nathanael (INA); Deyana Lomban (INA)	15	15
Sathinee Chankrachangwong (THA); Mathinee Naraweerawut (THA)	3	3
2	Qin Yiyuan (CHN); Tang Hetian (CHN)	15	15

Semifinals
1	Ge Fei (CHN); Gu Jun (CHN)	15	15
Ra Kyung-min (KOR); Chung Jae-hee (KOR)	11	9
3	Eliza Nathanael (INA); Deyana Lomban (INA)	15	15
2	Qin Yiyuan (CHN); Tang Hetian (CHN)	10	5

Finals
1	Ge Fei (CHN); Gu Jun (CHN)	12	15	15
3	Eliza Nathanael (INA); Deyana Lomban (INA)	15	9	11
