= George Rimarcdi =

Indonesian-born Swedish badminton player

Personal information
- Born: 1 March 1975 (age 51) Bandung, West Java, Indonesia

Sport
- Country: Indonesia; Sweden
- Sport: Badminton
- Event: Men's singles

Men's singles
- BWF profile
Medal record
Men's badminton
Representing Indonesia
World Junior Championships
| Silver medal – second place | 1992 Jakarta | Boys' singles |

George Rimarcdi (born 1 March 1975) is an Indonesian-born Swedish retired badminton player. He represented Indonesia at the 1992 World Junior Championships, clinched a silver medal in the boys' singles event, and in 1997 he won a men's singles title at the Indonesia National Championships. He moved to Sweden since 1999, competed in the national event for Uppsala team. Rimarcdi won five Swedish National Championships titles, four in the singles, and once in the doubles events. After ending his career in Sweden, he returned to Indonesia and started a career as a coach in Exist club. He is currently a men's single coach for Indonesian national pratama (junior) team.

== Personal life ==
Rimarcdi was born in Bandung, to parents Risyan and Vera Paraida. At first, his father named him Rimarcdi because he was born in March, but later his mother added George as his first name, referred to American famous and great people who have the name George, like George W. Bush. He began to play badminton at aged ten, joined pusdiklat BM–77 in 1984, pusdiklat SGS under coach Iie Sumirat and Edy Ismanto in 1988, and then in Hadtex. After graduating from senior high school in 1994, his talent scouted by Indonesia national team.

== Achievements ==
=== World Junior Championships ===
Boys' singles
| Year | Venue | Opponent | Score | Result |
|---|---|---|---|---|
| 1992 | Istora Senayan; Jakarta, Indonesia | (China) Sun Jun | 9–15, 11–15 | Silver |

=== IBF World Grand Prix ===
The World Badminton Grand Prix sanctioned by International Badminton Federation (IBF) since 1983.

Men's singles
| Year | Tournament | Opponent | Score | Result |
|---|---|---|---|---|
| 1995 | French Open | (Sweden) Tomas Johansson | 10–15, 15–9, 15–4 | (gold) Winner |
| 1995 | Hamburg Cup | (Indonesia) Marleve Mainaky | 9–15, 15–7, 15–12 | (gold) Winner |
| 2000 | Denmark Open | (Denmark) Peter Gade | 11–15, 12–15 | (silver) Runner-up |

=== IBF International ===
Men's singles
| Year | Tournament | Opponent | Score | Result |
|---|---|---|---|---|
| 1997 | Indonesia International | (Indonesia) Agus Hariyanto | 15–17, 15–14, 15–8 | (gold) Winner |
| 2002 | Norwegian International | (Finland) Kasperi Salo | 12–15, 8–15 | (silver) Runner-up |
| 2003 | Finnish International | (Finland) Kasperi Salo | 3–7 retired | (silver) Runner-up |
| 2003 | Bitburger International | (Netherlands) Dicky Palyama | 2–15, 4–15 | (silver) Runner-up |
| 2006 | Hungarian International | (Denmark) Kasper Ipsen | 21–18, 10–21, 21–17 | (gold) Winner |
