= Yao Jie =

Chinese-born Dutch badminton player

Yao Jie 姚洁
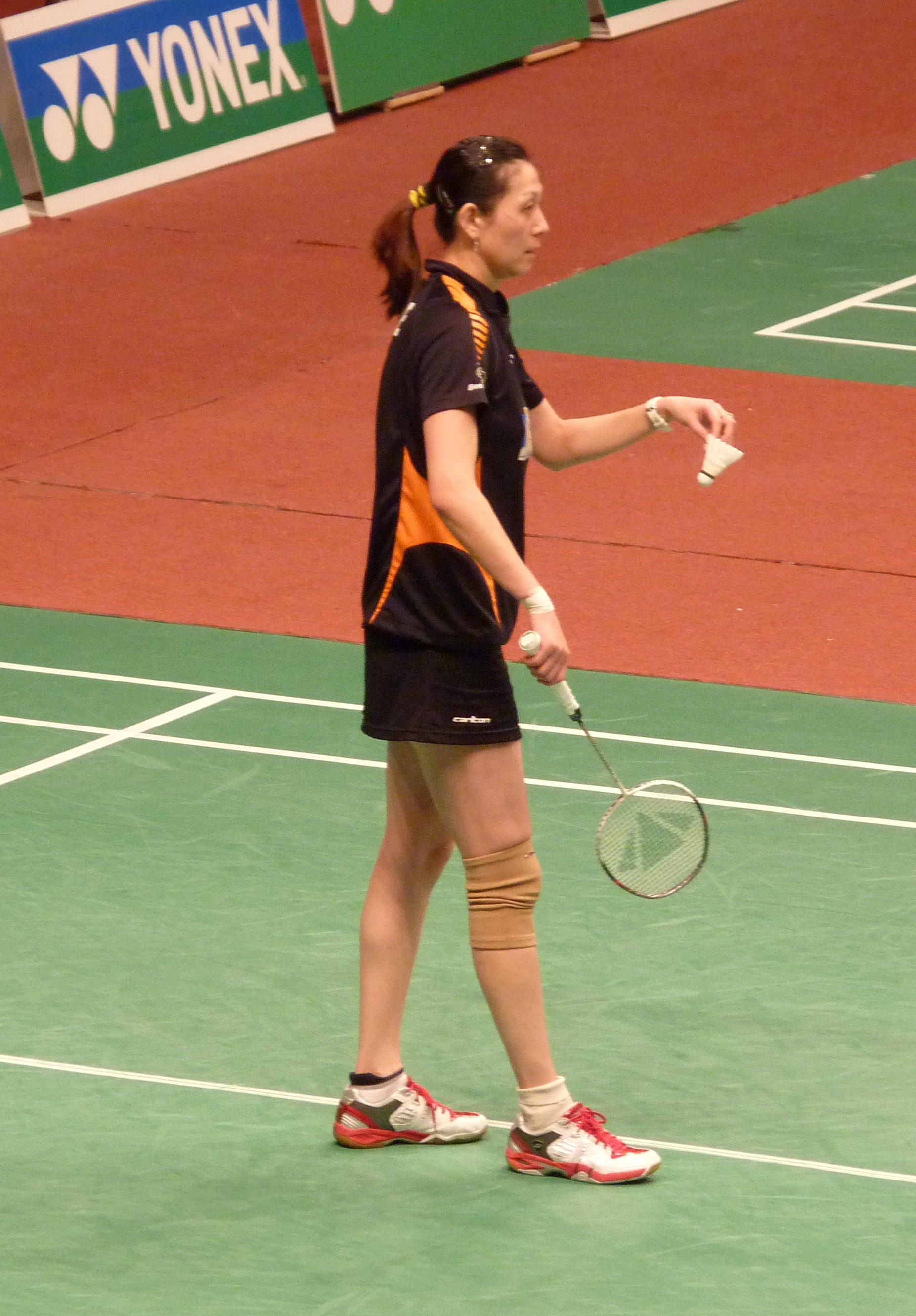

Personal information
- Born: 10 April 1977 (age 49)

Sport
- Country: Netherlands
- Sport: Badminton
- Handedness: Right

Women's singles
- Current ranking: 32 (2 May 2013)
- BWF profile
Medal record
Women's badminton
Representing Netherlands
World Cup
Bronze medal – third place	2005 Yiyang	Women's singles
Uber Cup
Silver medal – second place	2006 Tokyo	Women's team
European Championships
Gold medal – first place	2002 Malmö	Women's singles
Bronze medal – third place	2004 Geneva	Women's singles
Bronze medal – third place	2006 Den Bosch	Women's singles
Bronze medal – third place	2012 Karlskrona	Women's singles
European Mixed Team Championships
Silver medal – second place	2004 Geneva	Mixed team
Silver medal – second place	2006 Den Bosch	Mixed team
Bronze medal – third place	2002 Malmö	Mixed team
European Women's Team Championships
Gold medal – first place	2006 Thessalonica	Women's team
Silver medal – second place	2008 Almere	Women's team
Bronze medal – third place	2012 Amsterdam	Women's team
Representing China
East Asian Games
Gold medal – first place	1997 Busan	Women's team
World Junior Championships
Gold medal – first place	1994 Kuala Lumpur	Girls' doubles
Silver medal – second place	1994 Kuala Lumpur	Mixed doubles

Yao Jie (simplified Chinese: 姚洁; traditional Chinese: 姚潔; pinyin: Yáo Jié; born 10 April 1977) is a Chinese-born badminton player who now resides in the Netherlands.

Yao is one of a number of badminton players who have emigrated from China, in part, because the depth of badminton talent in that country has made it difficult for them to be selected for major international competitions. Prior to her move to the Netherlands, she won the BWF World Junior Championships in girls' doubles with Liu Lu in 1994 at Kuala Lumpur, Malaysia, and helped the Chinese national women's team clinch a gold medal at the 1997 East Asian Games. But her passion was for the ladies singles event.

Since moving to the Netherlands Yao Jie has won the women's singles event four times at the Dutch Open (2003, 2008, 2009 & 2011), she won the Thailand Open twice (2004, 2005), and the biennial European Championships once (2002), and a high number of 11 Dutch National Championships. Nine times the Dutch crown in singles and twice in doubles. She was also a three-times European bronze medalist in the 2004, 2006 European Badminton Championships and 2012 European Badminton Championships. She won the Velo Dutch International twice, in 2001 beating Mia Audina 9–11, 11–1, 13–10 and in 2012 beating Malaysian Sonia Su Ya Cheah 19–21, 21–9, 21–12 in the final. She also won the Italian International in 2011 beating Bulgarian Petya Nedelcheva in the final 21–11, 21–17 and won the Finnish International Open in 2012 beating Canadian Michelle Li 22–20, 21–19. Yao Jie was a runner-up to Zhang Ning at the China Open in 2006, runner-up to Juliane Schenk of Germany at the 2010 Dutch Open, runner-up to Li Xuerui of China at the 2011 Bitburger Open Grand Prix Gold and runner-up to Juliane Schenk at the 2012 Bitburger Open Grand Prix Gold.

Her performances at 2004 Olympic Games and at recent BWF World Championships have not been among her strongest. She was eliminated in the round of 16 at the Athens Games by Hong Kong's Wang Chen and has proceeded no farther than that round in any of her World Championship appearances. A big disappointment was her non-participation at the 2008 Olympic Games in her native China, despite being qualified by the international norm, but not by the stricter Dutch qualifying norm. In January 2009 Yao Jie married Dutch player Eric Pang.

In March 2011 Yao Jie was part of the Dutch Fource team, together with Dutch top players Dicky Palyama, Judith Meulendijks and Eric Pang. This team was formed as a result of a conflict with the Nederlandse Badminton Bond sponsored by Yonex, and these four players were non Yonex sponsored players, Yao Jie playing for sponsor Carlton. The conflict heightened in 2011 when these four non Yonex sponsored players were not included in the National squad to play the European Team Championships in Amsterdam. Despite all these juridical sponsor wranglings, Yao Jie managed to qualify for the London Olympics. At the 2012 Olympic Games in the Women's Singles Yao Jie won Group F by beating Akvilė Stapušaitytė of Lithuania 21–16, 21–7 and Ragna Ingólfsdóttir of Iceland 21–12, 25–23. After the group stage, in the knock-out stage round of 16 Yao Jie lost to Saina Nehwal of India 14–21, 16–21. Saina later progressed to win India's first Olympic badminton medal, a bronze.

Nowadays Yao Jie has her own Badminton Academy at her hometown Wuhan in China and is ambassador for Dutch Badminton in sports and cultural exchanges between the Netherlands and China.

== Achievements ==
=== World Cup ===
Women's singles
Year	Venue	Opponent	Score	Result
2005	Olympic Park; Yiyang, China	(China) Zhang Ning	Walkover	Bronze

=== European Championships ===
Women's singles
Year	Venue	Opponent	Score	Result
2002	Baltiska hallen Malmö, Sweden	(Netherlands) Mia Audina	8–6, 7–3, 7–1	Gold
2004	Queue d’Arve Sport Center; Geneva, Switzerland	(France) Pi Hongyan	4–11, 6–11	Bronze
2006	Maaspoort Sports and Events; Den Bosch, Netherlands	(Germany) Xu Huaiwen	Walkover	Bronze
2012	Telenor Arena; Karlskrona, Sweden	(Germany) Juliane Schenk	13–21, 10–21	Bronze

=== World Junior Championships ===
Girls' doubles
Year	Venue	Partner	Opponent	Score	Result
1994	Kuala Lumpur Badminton Stadium; Kuala Lumpur, Malaysia	(China) Liu Lu	(China) Qiang Hong (China) Wang Li	17–16, 7–15, 15–7	Gold

Mixed doubles
Year	Venue	Partner	Opponent	Score	Result
1994	Kuala Lumpur Badminton Stadium; Kuala Lumpur, Malaysia	(China) Yang Bing	(China) Zhang Wei (China) Qiang Hong	8–15, 6–15	Silver

=== BWF Grand Prix ===
The BWF Grand Prix had two levels, the Grand Prix and Grand Prix Gold. It was a series of badminton tournaments sanctioned by the Badminton World Federation (BWF) and played between 2007 and 2017. The World Badminton Grand Prix was sanctioned by the International Badminton Federation from 1983 to 2006.

Women's singles
Year	Tournament	Opponent	Score	Result
1995	Brunei Open	(China) Zeng Yaqiong	11–5, 12–10	(gold) Winner
1996	German Open	(Sweden) Margit Borg	11–1, 11–0	(gold) Winner
1998	Dutch Open	(China) Zhou Mi	13–10, 11–13, 4–11	(silver) Runner-up
2001	Dutch Open	(Netherlands) Mia Audina	5–7, 7–1, 5–7, 5–7	(silver) Runner-up
2002	German Open	(France) Pi Hongyan	11–4, 9–11, 7–11	(silver) Runner-up
2003	Dutch Open	(China) Dai Yun	13–10, 3–0 Retired	(gold) Winner
2004	Thailand Open	(South Korea) Jun Jae-youn	11–8, 2–11, 11–6	(gold) Winner
2004	Dutch Open	(France) Pi Hongyan	5–11, 4–11	(silver) Runner-up
2004	Denmark Open	(China) Xie Xingfang	9–11, 11–8, 7–11	(silver) Runner-up
2005	Thailand Open	(Germany) Xu Huaiwen	11–6, 11–7	(gold) Winner
2005	Dutch Open	(Germany) Xu Huaiwen	7–11, 2–11	(silver) Runner-up
2006	China Open	(China) Zhang Ning	14–21, 5–21	(silver) Runner-up
2008	Dutch Open	(Bulgaria) Linda Zetchiri	21–14, 21–13	(gold) Winner
2009	Dutch Open	(Netherlands) Judith Meulendijks	21–11, 21–12	(gold) Winner
2010	Dutch Open	(Germany) Juliane Schenk	13–21, 21–14, 15–21	(silver) Runner-up
2011	Dutch Open	(India) P. V. Sindhu	21–16, 21–17	(gold) Winner
2011	Bitburger Open	(China) Li Xuerui	8–21, 9–21	(silver) Runner-up
2012	Bitburger Open	(Germany) Juliane Schenk	10–21, 21–15, 23–25	(silver) Runner-up

BWF Grand Prix Gold tournament
BWF Grand Prix tournament

=== BWF International Challenge/Series ===
Women's singles
Year	Tournament	Opponent	Score	Result
2001	Dutch International	(Netherlands) Mia Audina	9–11, 11–1, 13–10	(gold) Winner
2009	Belgian International	(Japan) Misaki Matsutomo	21–14, 14–21, 21–16	(gold) Winner
2011	Italian International	(Bulgaria) Petya Nedelcheva	21–11, 21–17	(gold) Winner
2012	Finnish Open	(Canada) Michelle Li	22–20, 21–19	(gold) Winner
2012	Dutch International	(Malaysia) Soniia Cheah	19–21, 21–9, 21–12	(gold) Winner

BWF International Challenge tournament
BWF International Series tournament

== Record Against Selected Opponents ==
Includes results from all competitions against Super Series finalists, World Championship semifinalists, Olympic quarterfinalists, and all Olympic opponents.

- (Bulgaria) Petya Nedelcheva 7–4
- (China) Gong Ruina 0–2
- (China) Gong Zhichao 0–1
- (China) Jiang Yanjiao 0–10
- (China) Li Xuerui 0–2
- (China) Liu Xin 1–0
- (China) Lu Lan 1–3
- (China) Wang Lin 0–2
- (China) Wang Shixian 0–3
- (China) Wang Xin 0–2
- (China) Wang Yihan 1–3
- (China) Xie Xingfang 2–4
- (China) Ye Zhaoying 0–1
- (China) Zhang Ning 3–8
- (China) Zhu Lin 1–2
- (Chinese Taipei) Cheng Shao-chieh 1–2
- (Chinese Taipei) Tai Tzu-ying 1–1
- (Denmark) Tine Baun 5–3
- (Denmark) Camilla Martin 1–4
- (England) Tracey Hallam 3–0
- (France) Pi Hongyan 3–12
- (Germany) Juliane Schenk 2–4
- (Germany) Xu Huaiwen 3–6
- (Hong Kong) Wang Chen 0–1
- (Hong Kong) Yip Pui Yin 3–6
- (Hong Kong) Zhou Mi 0–7
- (Iceland) Ragna Ingólfsdóttir 1–0
- (India) Saina Nehwal 2–4
- (Indonesia) Maria Kristin Yulianti 0–2
- (Japan) Eriko Hirose 2–4
- (Japan) Sayaka Sato 1–0
- (Japan) Shizuka Uchida 2–0
- (South Korea) Bae Youn-joo 1–4
- (South Korea) Sung Ji-hyun 1–4
- (Lithuania) Akvilė Stapušaitytė 1–0
- (Netherlands) Mia Audina 2–2
- (Malaysia) Wong Mew Choo 2–0
- (Singapore) Jiang Yanmei 1–0
- (Spain) Carolina Marín 1–1
- (Thailand) Porntip Buranaprasertsuk 0–1
- (Thailand) Ratchanok Intanon 0–3
