= Badminton at the 1998 Asian Games =

- Venue: Thammasat Gymnasium 2
- Dates: 8–17 December
- Competitors: 132 from 14 nations

Badminton was contested at the 1998 Asian Games in Thammasat Gymnasium 2, Bangkok, Thailand from December 8 to December 17.

Singles, doubles, and team events were contested for both men and women. Mixed doubles were also contested.

== Medalists ==
Event	Gold	Silver	Bronze
Men's singles	Dong Jiong; China	Hendrawan; Indonesia	Sun Jun; China
Men's singles	Dong Jiong; China	Hendrawan; Indonesia	Yong Hock Kin; Malaysia
Men's doubles	Indonesia; Ricky Subagja; Rexy Mainaky	Thailand; Pramote Teerawiwatana; Siripong Siripool	China; Liu Yong; Yu Jinhao
Men's doubles	Indonesia; Ricky Subagja; Rexy Mainaky	Thailand; Pramote Teerawiwatana; Siripong Siripool	South Korea; Lee Dong-soo; Yoo Yong-sung
Men's team	Indonesia; Tony Gunawan; Hendrawan; Taufik Hidayat; Tri Kusharjanto; Rexy Mainaky; Budi Santoso; Ricky Subagja; Candra Wijaya	China; Chen Gang; Dong Jiong; Liu Yong; Luo Yigang; Sun Jun; Yu Jinhao; Zhang Jun; Zhang Wei	South Korea; Ahn Jae-chang; Ha Tae-kwon; Hwang Sun-ho; Kang Kyung-jin; Kim Dong-moon; Lee Dong-soo; Park Sung-woo; Yoo Yong-sung
Men's team	Indonesia; Tony Gunawan; Hendrawan; Taufik Hidayat; Tri Kusharjanto; Rexy Mainaky; Budi Santoso; Ricky Subagja; Candra Wijaya	China; Chen Gang; Dong Jiong; Liu Yong; Luo Yigang; Sun Jun; Yu Jinhao; Zhang Jun; Zhang Wei	Malaysia; Chan Chong Ming; Cheah Soon Thoe; James Chua; Jeremy Gan; Roslin Hashim; Pang Cheh Chang; Wong Choong Hann; Yong Hock Kin
Women's singles	Kanako Yonekura; Japan	Gong Zhichao; China	Sujitra Ekmongkolpaisarn; Thailand
Women's singles	Kanako Yonekura; Japan	Gong Zhichao; China	Lee Joo-hyun; South Korea
Women's doubles	China; Ge Fei; Gu Jun	Indonesia; Eliza Nathanael; Deyana Lomban	South Korea; Ra Kyung-min; Chung Jae-hee
Women's doubles	China; Ge Fei; Gu Jun	Indonesia; Eliza Nathanael; Deyana Lomban	China; Qin Yiyuan; Tang Hetian
Women's team	China; Dai Yun; Ge Fei; Gong Zhichao; Gu Jun; Qin Yiyuan; Tang Hetian; Ye Zhaoying; Zhang Ning	South Korea; Chung Jae-hee; Kim Ji-hyun; Kim Shin-young; Lee Joo-hyun; Lee Kyung-won; Lee Soon-deuk; Ra Kyung-min; Yim Kyung-jin	Japan; Takako Ida; Saori Ito; Yoshiko Iwata; Haruko Matsuda; Yasuko Mizui; Kanako Yonekura
Women's team	China; Dai Yun; Ge Fei; Gong Zhichao; Gu Jun; Qin Yiyuan; Tang Hetian; Ye Zhaoying; Zhang Ning	South Korea; Chung Jae-hee; Kim Ji-hyun; Kim Shin-young; Lee Joo-hyun; Lee Kyung-won; Lee Soon-deuk; Ra Kyung-min; Yim Kyung-jin	Indonesia; Mia Audina; Carmelita; Indarti Issolina; Cindana Hartono Kusuma; Deyana Lomban; Meiluawati; Eliza Nathanael; Minarti Timur
Mixed doubles	South Korea; Kim Dong-moon; Ra Kyung-min	South Korea; Lee Dong-soo; Yim Kyung-jin	Indonesia; Tri Kusharjanto; Minarti Timur
Mixed doubles	South Korea; Kim Dong-moon; Ra Kyung-min	South Korea; Lee Dong-soo; Yim Kyung-jin	China; Zhang Jun; Qin Yiyuan

== Medal table ==
Rank	Nation	Gold	Silver	Bronze	Total
1	China (CHN)	3	2	4	9
2	Indonesia (INA)	2	2	2	6
3	South Korea (KOR)	1	2	4	7
4	Japan (JPN)	1	0	1	2
5	Thailand (THA)	0	1	1	2
6	Malaysia (MAS)	0	0	2	2
Totals (6 entries)		7	7	14	28

== Participating nations ==
A total of 132 athletes from 14 nations competed in badminton at the 1998 Asian Games:

- Cambodia (2)
- China (16)
- Chinese Taipei (16)
- Hong Kong (10)
- India (1)
- Indonesia (16)
- Iran (4)
- Japan (11)
- Malaysia (16)
- Pakistan (2)
- Philippines (4)
- South Korea (16)
- Sri Lanka (2)
- Thailand (16)
