= 1995 Singapore Open =

Tournament details
- Dates: 17 July 1995– 23 July 1995
- Edition: 48th
- Level: World Grand Prix 6 Stars
- Total prize money: US$165,000
- Venue: Singapore Indoor Stadium
- Location: Kallang, Singapore

Champions
- Men's singles: (Indonesia) Joko Suprianto
- Women's singles: (Sweden) Lim Xiaoqing
- Men's doubles: (Indonesia) Rexy Mainaky (Indonesia) Ricky Subagja
- Women's doubles: (China) Ge Fei (China) Gu Jun
- Mixed doubles: (Indonesia) Tri Kusharjanto (Indonesia) Minarti Timur

The 1995 Singapore Open (also known as the Konica Cup) was a six-star badminton tournament that took place at the Singapore Indoor Stadium in Singapore, from July 17 to July 23, 1995. The total prize money on offer was US$165,000. This tournament was planned as a 4-star IBF World Grand Prix, but was later upgraded to a 6-star tournament.

== Final results ==
Category	Winners	Runners-up	Score
Men's singles	(Indonesia) Joko Suprianto	(Indonesia) Hermawan Susanto	15–11, 3–15, 15–10
Women's singles	(Sweden) Lim Xiaoqing	(South Korea) Bang Soo-hyun	11–7, 6–11, 11–8
Men's doubles	(Indonesia) Rexy Mainaky & Ricky Subagja	(Indonesia) Antonius Ariantho & Denny Kantono	15–7, 18–16
Women's doubles	(China) Ge Fei & Gu Jun	(South Korea) Gil Young-ah & Jang Hye-ock	15–12, 15–7
Mixed doubles	(Indonesia) Tri Kusharjanto & Minarti Timur	(South Korea) Kim Dong-moon & Gil Young-ah	15–12, 9–15, 15–10
