= Eliza Nathanael =

Indonesian badminton player (born 1973)

Personal information
- Born: 27 May 1973 (age 53) Surabaya, East Java, Indonesia
- Height: 1.61 m (5 ft 3 in)
- Weight: 64 kg (141 lb)

Sport
- Country: Indonesia
- Sport: Badminton
- Handedness: Right
- Event: Women's & mixed doubles
Medal record
Women's badminton
Representing Indonesia
World Championships
Bronze medal – third place	1993 Birmingham	Mixed doubles
Bronze medal – third place	1997 Glasgow	Women's doubles
World Cup
Gold medal – first place	1995 Jakarta	Women's doubles
Silver medal – second place	1993 New Delhi	Mixed doubles
Bronze medal – third place	1996 Jakarta	Women's doubles
Bronze medal – third place	1997 Yogyakarta	Women's doubles
World Masters Games
Bronze medal – third place	2025 Taipei	Women's doubles 50+
Sudirman Cup
Silver medal – second place	1991 Copenhagen	Mixed team
Silver medal – second place	1993 Birmingham	Mixed team
Silver medal – second place	1995 Lausanne	Mixed team
Bronze medal – third place	1997 Glasgow	Mixed team
Uber Cup
Gold medal – first place	1994 Jakarta	Women's team
Gold medal – first place	1996 Hong Kong	Women's team
Silver medal – second place	1998 Hong Kong	Women's team
Bronze medal – third place	2000 Kuala Lumpur	Women's team
Asian Games
Silver medal – second place	1994 Hiroshima	Women's team
Silver medal – second place	1998 Bangkok	Women's doubles
Bronze medal – third place	1994 Hiroshima	Mixed doubles
Bronze medal – third place	1998 Bangkok	Women's team
Asian Championships
Gold medal – first place	1996 Surabaya	Women's doubles
Bronze medal – third place	1995 Beijing	Women's doubles
Bronze medal – third place	1998 Bangkok	Women's doubles
Asian Cup
Silver medal – second place	1991 Jakarta	Mixed doubles
Silver medal – second place	1994 Beijing	Mixed doubles
Southeast Asian Games
Gold medal – first place	1993 Singapore	Mixed doubles
Gold medal – first place	1993 Singapore	Women's team
Gold medal – first place	1995 Chiang Mai	Women's team
Gold medal – first place	1997 Jakarta	Women's doubles
Gold medal – first place	1997 Jakarta	Mixed doubles
Gold medal – first place	1997 Jakarta	Women's team
Silver medal – second place	1993 Singapore	Women's doubles
Silver medal – second place	1995 Chiang Mai	Women's doubles
Silver medal – second place	1995 Chiang Mai	Mixed doubles

Eliza Nathanael (born 27 May 1973) is an Indonesian retired badminton player who specialized in doubles events.

== Career ==
A solid international player throughout the 1990s, Nathanael had most of her early success in mixed doubles. She won titles at the China (1992), Hong Kong (1992), Thailand (1992), and French (1993) Opens with Aryono Miranat. They were bronze medalists at the 1993 IBF World Championships in Birmingham, England. Nathanael also won mixed doubles at the Southeast Asian Games in 1993 with Rudy Gunawan and in 1997 with Candra Wijaya.

In women's doubles Nathanael was competitive internationally with a variety of partners. She won the U.S. Open (1996), two Indonesia Opens (1996, 1997) and the Southeast Asian Games (1997) with Resiana Zelin. They were twice runners-up at the prestigious All-England Championships (1995, 1997), were quarter-finalists at the 1996 Summer Olympic Games in Atlanta, and earned bronze medals together at the 1997 IBF World Championships in Glasgow, Scotland. Nathanael won women's doubles at the 1996 Asian Championships with another Indonesian teammate, Finarsih, and her third consecutive Indonesia Open title, in 1998, with Deyana Lomban.

Nathanael was a member of several Indonesian Uber Cup (women's international) teams including two which won back to back world team championships in 1994 and 1996.

== Achievements ==
=== World Championships ===
Women's doubles
Year	Venue	Partner	Opponent	Score	Result
1997	Scotstoun Centre, Glasgow, Scotland	(Indonesia) Zelin Resiana	(China) Qin Yiyuan (China) Tang Yongshu	15–11, 11–15, 9–15	Bronze

Mixed doubles
Year	Venue	Partner	Opponent	Score	Result
1993	National Indoor Arena, Birmingham, England	(Indonesia) Aryono Miranat	(Denmark) Jon Holst-Christensen (Denmark) Grete Mogensen	5–15, 4–15	Bronze

=== World Cup ===
Women's doubles
Year	Venue	Partner	Opponent	Score	Result
1995	Istora Senayan, Jakarta, Indonesia	(Indonesia) Zelin Resiana	(Indonesia) Finarsih (Indonesia) Lili Tampi	10–15, 15–11, 10–11 retired	Gold
1996	Istora Senayan, Jakarta, Indonesia	(Indonesia) Zelin Resiana	(China) Qin Yiyuan (China) Tang Yongshu	9–15, 4–15	Bronze
1997	Among Rogo Sports Hall, Yogyakarta, Indonesia	(Indonesia) Zelin Resiana	(China) Ge Fei (China) Gu Jun	9–15, 5–15	Bronze

Mixed doubles
Year	Venue	Partner	Opponent	Score	Result
1993	Indira Gandhi Arena, New Delhi, India	(Indonesia) Aryono Miranat	(Sweden) Peter Axelsson (England) Gillian Gowers	15–10, 7–15, 5–15	Silver

=== World Masters Games ===
Women's doubles
Year	Age	Venue	Partner	Opponent	Score	Result	Ref.
2025	50+	Taipei Gymnasium; Taipei, Taiwan	(Indonesia) Lidya Djaelawijaya	(Chinese Taipei)		Bronze	

=== Asian Games ===
Women's doubles
Year	Venue	Partner	Opponent	Score	Result
1998	Thammasat Gymnasium 2, Bangkok, Thailand	(Indonesia) Deyana Lomban	(China) Ge Fei (China) Gu Jun	15–12, 9–15, 11–15	Silver

Mixed doubles
Year	Venue	Partner	Opponent	Score	Result
1994	Tsuru Memorial Gymnasium, Hiroshima, Japan	(Indonesia) Rudy Gunawan	(South Korea) Yoo Yong-sung (South Korea) Chung So-young	7–15, 6–15	Bronze

=== Asian Championships ===
Women's doubles
Year	Venue	Partner	Opponent	Score	Result
1995	Olympic Sports Center Gymnasium, Beijing, China	(Indonesia) Zelin Resiana	(China) Ge Fei (China) Gu Jun	4–15, 5–15	Bronze
1996	Pancasila Hall, Surabaya, Indonesia	(Indonesia) Finarsih	(Indonesia) Indarti Issolina (Indonesia) Deyana Lomban	15–8, 15–6	Gold
1998	Nimibutr Stadium, Bangkok, Thailand	(Indonesia) Deyana Lomban	(China) Ge Fei (China) Gu Jun	2–15, 10–15	Bronze

=== Asian Cup ===
Mixed doubles
Year	Venue	Partner	Opponent	Score	Result
1991	Istora Senayan, Jakarta, Indonesia	(Indonesia) Aryono Miranat	(South Korea) Shon Jin-hwan (South Korea) Gil Young-ah	5–15, 15–8, 7–15	Silver
1994	Beijing Gymnasium, Beijing, China	(Indonesia) Aryono Miranat	(China) Liu Jianjun (China) Ge Fei	4–15, 15–13, 10–15	Silver

=== Southeast Asian Games ===
Women's doubles
Year	Venue	Partner	Opponent	Score	Result
1993	Singapore Badminton Hall, Singapore	(Indonesia) Zelin Resiana	(Indonesia) Finarsih (Indonesia) Lili Tampi	5–15, 15–6, 5–15	Silver
1995	Gymnasium 3, 700th Anniversary Sport Complex; Chiang Mai, Thailand	(Indonesia) Zelin Resiana	(Indonesia) Finarsih (Indonesia) Lili Tampi	7–15, 3–15	Silver
1997	Asia-Africa hall, Gelora Bung Karno Sports Complex; Jakarta, Indonesia	(Indonesia) Zelin Resiana	(Indonesia) Indarti Issolina (Indonesia) Deyana Lomban	15–5, 15–13	Gold

Mixed doubles
Year	Venue	Partner	Opponent	Score	Result
1993	Singapore Badminton Hall, Singapore	(Indonesia) Rudy Gunawan	(Indonesia) Denny Kantono (Indonesia) Minarti Timur	15–6, 18–15	Gold
1995	Gymnasium 3, 700th Anniversary Sport Complex; Chiang Mai, Thailand	(Indonesia) Denny Kantono	(Indonesia) Tri Kusharjanto (Indonesia) Minarti Timur	8–15, 4–15	Silver
1997	Asia-Africa hall, Gelora Bung Karno Sports Complex; Jakarta, Indonesia	(Indonesia) Candra Wijaya	(Indonesia) Tri Kusharjanto (Indonesia) Minarti Timur	12–15, 15–7, 15–2	Gold

=== World Junior Championships ===
The Bimantara World Junior Championships was an international invitation badminton tournament for junior players. It was held in Jakarta, Indonesia from 1987 to 1991.

Girls' doubles
Year	Venue	Partner	Opponent	Score	Result
1989	Istora Senayan, Jakarta, Indonesia	(Indonesia) Finarsih	(South Korea) Shon Hye-joo (South Korea) Jung Eun-hwa	0–15, 17–16, 15–12	Gold

=== IBF World Grand Prix ===
The World Badminton Grand Prix was sanctioned by the International Badminton Federation from 1983 to 2006.

Women's doubles
Year	Tournament	Partner	Opponent	Score	Result
1991	U.S. Open	(Indonesia) Catherine	(South Korea) Shim Eun-jung (South Korea) Kang Bok-seung	7–15, 13–15	(silver) Runner-up
1993	Indonesia Open	(Indonesia) Zelin Resiana	(Indonesia) Finarsih (Indonesia) Lili Tampi	16–17, 12–15	(silver) Runner-up
1993	Hong Kong Open	(Indonesia) Zelin Resiana	(China) Chen Ying (China) Wu Yuhong	7–15, 8–15	(silver) Runner-up
1993	World Grand Prix Finals	(Indonesia) Rosiana Tendean	(Indonesia) Finarsih (Indonesia) Lili Tampi	11–15, 10–15	(silver) Runner-up
1994	Malaysia Open	(Indonesia) Zelin Resiana	(China) Ge Fei (China) Gu Jun	5–15, 11–15	(silver) Runner-up
1995	All England Open	(Indonesia) Zelin Resiana	(South Korea) Gil Young-ah (South Korea) Jang Hye-ock	6–15, 3–15	(silver) Runner-up
1995	German Open	(Indonesia) Zelin Resiana	(China) Chen Ying (China) Peng Xinyong	Walkover	(gold) Winner
1996	Indonesia Open	(Indonesia) Zelin Resiana	(Denmark) Helene Kirkegaard (Denmark) Rikke Olsen	15–7, 15–4	(gold) Winner
1996	U.S. Open	(Indonesia) Zelin Resiana	(England) Julie Bradbury (England) Joanne Goode	15–7, 15–5	(gold) Winner
1996	World Grand Prix Finals	(Indonesia) Zelin Resiana	(China) Ge Fei (China) Gu Jun	4–15, 4–15	(silver) Runner-up
1997	Japan Open	(Indonesia) Zelin Resiana	(China) Ge Fei (China) Gu Jun	15–12, 12–15, 1–15	(silver) Runner-up
1997	All England Open	(Indonesia) Zelin Resiana	(China) Ge Fei (China) Gu Jun	6–15, 9–15	(silver) Runner-up
1997	Indonesia Open	(Indonesia) Zelin Resiana	(Indonesia) Finarsih (Indonesia) Minarti Timur	15–10, 15–5	(gold) Winner
1997	Thailand Open	(Indonesia) Zelin Resiana	(China) Qin Yiyuan (China) Tang Yongshu	8–15, 2–15	(silver) Runner-up
1997	Vietnam Open	(Indonesia) Zelin Resiana	(Indonesia) Deyana Lomban (Indonesia) Indarti Issolina	15–11, 12–15, 15–11	(gold) Winner
1998	Malaysia Open	(Indonesia) Zelin Resiana	(Denmark) Marlene Thomsen (Denmark) Rikke Olsen	8–15, 4–15	(silver) Runner-up
1998	Indonesia Open	(Indonesia) Deyana Lomban	(Denmark) Marlene Thomsen (Denmark) Rikke Olsen	7–15, 17–15, 15–7	(gold) Winner
1999	Indonesia Open	(Indonesia) Deyana Lomban	(Denmark) Helene Kirkegaard (Denmark) Rikke Olsen	12–15, 7–15	(silver) Runner-up

Mixed doubles
Year	Tournament	Partner	Opponent	Score	Result
1991	Indonesia Open	(Indonesia) Aryono Miranat	(Denmark) Thomas Lund (Denmark) Pernille Dupont	11–15, 9–15	(silver) Runner-up
1992	Indonesia Open	(Indonesia) Aryono Miranat	(Sweden) Pär-Gunnar Jönsson (Sweden) Maria Bengtsson	15–12, 11–15, 12–15	(silver) Runner-up
1992	China Open	(Indonesia) Aryono Miranat	(China) Chen Xingdong (China) Sun Man	15–8, 9–15, 17–16	(gold) Winner
1992	Hong Kong Open	(Indonesia) Aryono Miranat	(South Korea) Lee Sang-bok (South Korea) Gil Young-ah	4–15, 11–15	(silver) Runner-up
1992	Thailand Open	(Indonesia) Aryono Miranat	(Indonesia) Denny Kantono (Indonesia) Zelin Resiana	15–2, 2–15, 15–1	(gold) Winner
1993	French Open	(Indonesia) Aryono Miranat	(Indonesia) Rudy Gunawan (Indonesia) Rosiana Tendean	15–7, 15–12	(gold) Winner

IBF Grand Prix tournament
IBF Grand Prix Finals tournament

=== IBF International ===
Women's doubles
Year	Tournament	Partner	Opponent	Score	Result
1991	Polish Open	(Indonesia) Catherine	(China) Wu Pei (China) Ye Sichuan	15–12, 15–10	(gold) Winner
