= Qin Yiyuan =

Chinese badminton player

Qin Yiyuan 秦艺源
Personal information
- Born: 14 February 1973 (age 53) Nanning, Guangxi, China
- Height: 1.73 m (5 ft 8 in)
- Weight: 62 kg (137 lb)

Sport
- Country: China
- Sport: Badminton
- Handedness: Right
- Event: Women's & mixed doubles

Women's & mixed doubles
- BWF profile
Medal record
Women's badminton
Representing China
Summer Olympics
Bronze medal – third place	2000 Sydney	Women's doubles
Bronze medal – third place	1996 Atlanta	Women's doubles
World Championships
Silver medal – second place	1997 Glasgow	Women's doubles
Bronze medal – third place	1999 Copenhagen	Women's doubles
Bronze medal – third place	1995 Lausanne	Women's doubles
World Cup
Silver medal – second place	1997 Yogyakarta	Women's doubles
Silver medal – second place	1996 Jakarta	Women's doubles
Sudirman Cup
Gold medal – first place	1997 Glasgow	Mixed team
Uber Cup
Gold medal – first place	2000 Kuala Lumpur	Women's team
Gold medal – first place	1998 Hong Kong	Women's team
Silver medal – second place	1996 Hong Kong	Women's team
Asian Games
Gold medal – first place	1998 Bangkok	Women's team
Bronze medal – third place	1998 Bangkok	Women's doubles
Bronze medal – third place	1998 Bangkok	Mixed doubles
Asian Championships
Silver medal – second place	1998 Bangkok	Women's doubles
Silver medal – second place	1995 Beijing	Women's doubles
Asian Cup
Bronze medal – third place	1995 Qingdao	Women's doubles
East Asian Games
Gold medal – first place	1993 Shanghai	Women's team
Silver medal – second place	1993 Shanghai	Women's doubles

Qin Yiyuan (simplified Chinese: 秦艺源; traditional Chinese: 秦藝源; pinyin: Qín Yìyuán; born 14 February 1973) is a Chinese former world level badminton player. Qin played internationally for China from the mid-1990s through the 2000 Summer Olympics, a period during which her fellow countrywomen Ge Fei and Gu Jun dominated international women's doubles play. Qin won women's doubles at the 1996 China Open, 1997 Thailand Open, 1998 Denmark Open with Tang Yongshu, and at the 1999 Thailand, French, and Denmark Opens, and 2000 Swiss Open with Gao Ling. She was a bronze medalist at the 1995 IBF World Championships and a silver medalist at the 1997 IBF World Championships with Tang Yongshu. She earned a bronze medal again at the 1999 edition of the tourney with Gao Ling. Qin also earned bronze medals for women's doubles at the 1996 and 2000 Summer Olympics, the first with Tang Yongshu and the second with Gao. She was a member of Chinese teams which captured the Uber Cup (women's world team competition and trophy) in 1998 and 2000.

== Achievements ==
=== Summer Olympics ===
Women's doubles
Year	Venue	Partner	Opponent	Score	Result
2000	The Dome, Sydney, Australia	(China) Gao Ling	(South Korea) Chung Jae-hee (South Korea) Ra Kyung-min	15–10, 15–4	Bronze
1996	GSU Sports Arena, Atlanta, United States	(China) Tang Yongshu	(Denmark) Helene Kirkegaard (Denmark) Rikke Olsen	7–15, 15–4, 15–8	Bronze

=== World Championships ===
Women's doubles
Year	Venue	Partner	Opponent	Score	Result
1999	Brøndby Arena, Copenhagen, Denmark	(China) Gao Ling	(China) Ge Fei (China) Gu Jun	6–15, 7–15	Bronze
1997	Scotstoun Centre, Glasgow, Scotland	(China) Tang Yongshu	(China) Ge Fei (China) Gu Jun	1–15, 8–15	Silver
1995	Malley Sports Centre, Lausanne, Switzerland	(China) Tang Yongshu	(South Korea) Gil Young-ah (South Korea) Jang Hye-ock	8–15, 6–15	Bronze

=== World Cup ===
Women's doubles
Year	Venue	Partner	Opponent	Score	Result
1997	Yogyakarta, Indonesia	(China) Tang Yongshu	(China) Ge Fei (China) Gu Jun	10–15, 15–9, 9–15	Silver
1996	Jakarta, Indonesia	(China) Tang Yongshu	(China) Ge Fei (China) Gu Jun	6–15, 12–15	Silver

=== Asian Games ===
Women's doubles
Year	Venue	Partner	Opponent	Score	Result
1998	Thammasat Gymnasium 2 Bangkok, Thailand	(China) Tang Yongshu	(Indonesia) Eliza Nathanael (Indonesia) Deyana Lomban	10–15, 5–15	Bronze

Mixed doubles
Year	Venue	Partner	Opponent	Score	Result
1998	Thammasat Gymnasium 2 Bangkok, Thailand	(China) Zhang Jun	(South Korea) Kim Dong-moon (South Korea) Ra Kyung-min	3–15, 6–15	Bronze

=== Asian Championships ===
Women's doubles
Year	Venue	Partner	Opponent	Score	Result
1998	Bangkok, Thailand	(China) Tang Yongshu	(China) Ge Fei (China) Gu Jun	8–15, 7–15	Silver
1995	Beijing, China	(China) Tang Yongshu	(China) Ge Fei (China) Gu Jun	1–15, 4–15	Silver

=== Asian Cup ===
Women's doubles
Year	Venue	Partner	Opponent	Score	Result
1995	Qingdao, China	(China) Tang Yongshu	(China) Ge Fei (China) Gu Jun	8–15, 6–15	Bronze

=== East Asian Games ===
Women's doubles
Year	Venue	Partner	Opponent	Score	Result
1993	Shanghai, China	(China) Zhang Ning	(South Korea) Kim Shin-young (South Korea) Shon Hye-joo	12–15, 11–15	Silver

=== IBF World Grand Prix ===
The World Badminton Grand Prix sanctioned by International Badminton Federation (IBF) since 1983.

Women's doubles
Year	Tournament	Partner	Opponent	Score	Result
2000	Swiss Open	(China) Gao Ling	(China) Huang Nanyan (China) Yang Wei	15–5, 8–15, 15–9	(gold) Winner
1999	China Open	(China) Gao Ling	(China) Ge Fei (China) Gu Jun	5–15, 6–15	(silver) Runner-up
1999	Denmark Open	(China) Gao Ling	(China) Chen Lin (China) Jiang Xuelian	15–12, 15–8	(gold) Winner
1999	German Open	(China) Gao Ling	(China) Chen Lin (China) Jiang Xuelian	13–15, 13–15	(silver) Runner-up
1999	Thailand Open	(China) Gao Ling	(Indonesia) Emma Ermawati (Indonesia) Vita Marissa	15–8, 15–2	(gold) Winner
1999	Malaysia Open	(China) Gao Ling	(China) Ge Fei (China) Gu Jun	8–15, 10–15	(silver) Runner-up
1998	Denmark Open	(China) Tang Yongshu	(China) Huang Nanyan (China) Yang Wei	15–17, 15–10, 15–11	(gold) Winner
1998	Singapore Open	(China) Tang Yongshu	(China) Ge Fei (China) Gu Jun	8–15, 13–15	(silver) Runner-up
1998	Japan Open	(China) Tang Yongshu	(China) Ge Fei (China) Gu Jun	Walkover	(silver) Runner-up
1997	Grand Prix Finals	(China) Tang Yongshu	(China) Ge Fei (China) Gu Jun	1–15, 8–15	(silver) Runner-up
1997	Thailand Open	(China) Tang Yongshu	(Indonesia) Eliza Nathanael (Indonesia) Zelin Resiana	15–8, 15–2	(gold) Winner
1997	China Open	(China) Tang Yongshu	(China) Ge Fei (China) Gu Jun	13–15, 11–15	(silver) Runner-up
1997	U.S. Open	(China) Tang Yongshu	(Japan) Yoshiko Iwata (Japan) Haruko Matsuda	15–6, 15–2	(gold) Winner
1997	Korea Open	(China) Tang Yongshu	(China) Ge Fei (China) Gu Jun	10–15, 10–15	(silver) Runner-up
1996	China Open	(China) Tang Yongshu	(South Korea) Kim Mee-hyang (South Korea) Park Soo-yun	15–2, 15–12	(gold) Winner
1995	Canadian Open	(China) Tang Yongshu	(South Korea) Gil Young-ah (South Korea) Jang Hye-ock	10–15, 4–15	(silver) Runner-up
1995	Indonesia Open	(China) Tang Yongshu	(China) Ge Fei (China) Gu Jun	6–15, 6–15	(silver) Runner-up
1994	Dutch Open	(China) Tang Yongshu	(China) Peng Xinyong (China) Zhang Jin	4–15, 7–15	(silver) Runner-up

=== IBF International ===
Women's doubles
Year	Tournament	Partner	Opponent	Score	Result
1999	French Open	(China) Gao Ling	(Malaysia) Ang Li Peng (Malaysia) Chor Hooi Yee	15–0, 15–3	(gold) Winner

Mixed doubles
Year	Tournament	Partner	Opponent	Score	Result
1999	French Open	(China) Chen Gang	(England) Ian Sullivan (England) Gail Emms	15–12, 15–12	(gold) Winner
