= Tang Yongshu =

Chinese badminton player

Tang Hetian 唐鹤恬
Personal information
- Born: Tang Yongshu 唐永淑; 5 January 1975 (age 51) Chongqing, China
- Height: 1.61 m (5 ft 3 in)
- Weight: 59 kg (130 lb)

Sport
- Country: China (1994-1999), Australia (2009-2014)
- Sport: Badminton
- Handedness: Left
- Event: Women's & mixed doubles

Women's & mixed doubles
- BWF profile
Medal record
Women's badminton
Representing China
Olympic Games
Bronze medal – third place	1996 Atlanta	Women's doubles
World Championships
Silver medal – second place	1997 Glasgow	Women's doubles
Bronze medal – third place	1995 Lausanne	Women's doubles
World Cup
Silver medal – second place	1997 Yogyakarta	Women's doubles
Silver medal – second place	1996 Jakarta	Women's doubles
Sudirman Cup
Gold medal – first place	1997 Glasgow	Mixed team
Uber Cup
Gold medal – first place	1998 Hong Kong	Women's team
Silver medal – second place	1996 Hong Kong	Women's team
Asian Games
Gold medal – first place	1998 Bangkok	Women's team
Bronze medal – third place	1998 Bangkok	Women's doubles
Asia Championships
Silver medal – second place	1998 Bangkok	Women's doubles
Silver medal – second place	1995 Beijing	Women's doubles
Bronze medal – third place	1998 Bangkok	Mixed doubles
Asian Cup
Bronze medal – third place	1995 Qingdao	Women's doubles
World Junior Championships
Silver medal – second place	1992 Jakarta	Girls' doubles
Representing Australia
Commonwealth Games
Bronze medal – third place	2010 Delhi	Women's doubles
Oceania Championships
Bronze medal – third place	2014 Ballarat	Women's doubles
Oceania Mixed Team Championships
Gold medal – first place	2014 Ballarat	Mixed team

Tang Hetian (Chinese: 唐鹤恬; born 5 January 1975), formerly known as Tang Yongshu (唐永淑), is a badminton player who competed internationally for China in the 1990s. She played for Australia in the 2000s as He Tian Tang.

== Career ==
Specializing in women's doubles, Tang earned a bronze medal at the 1995 IBF World Championships and a silver medal at the 1997 IBF World Championships with her regular partner, Qin Yiyuan. Tang and Qin were also bronze medalists at the 1996 Atlanta Olympics, yet they were overshadowed by fellow countrywomen Ge Fei and Gu Jun, the dominant women's doubles team of the day, who took gold at the latter two events. Tang and Qin won women's doubles at the 1997 Thailand Open and played together on the Chinese team that reclaimed the Uber Cup (women's world team championship trophy) from Indonesia in 1998.

After 1998, Tang retired from the Chinese national badminton team and later married her national teammate Yu Qi. They immigrated to Australia in the early 2000s. Tang played for the Australia national badminton team at the Delhi 2010 Commonwealth Games, where she won a bronze medal in the women's doubles event. The same year, she also represented Australia in the Uber Cup.

At the 2014 Oceania Badminton Championships, Tang won a gold medal in the mixed team event and a bronze in women's doubles.

Her daughter Angela Yu followed in her footsteps as an Olympic athlete in Paris 2024 for Australia in the Women's doubles event. Also her son Jack Yu has been competing for Australia for the last five years.

== Achievements ==
=== Olympic Games ===
Year	Venue	Partner	Opponent	Score	Result
1996	GSU Sports Arena; Atlanta, United States	(China) Qin Yiyuan	(Denmark) Helene Kirkegaard (Denmark) Rikke Olsen	7–15, 15–4, 15–8	Bronze

=== World Championships ===
Women's doubles
Year	Venue	Partner	Opponent	Score	Result
1995	Malley Sports Centre; Lausanne, Switzerland	(China) Qin Yiyuan	(South Korea) Gil Young-ah (South Korea) Jang Hye-ock	8–15, 6–15	Bronze
1997	Scotstoun Centre; Glasgow, Scotland	(China) Qin Yiyuan	(China) Ge Fei (China) Gu Jun	1–15, 8–15	Silver

=== World Cup ===
Women's doubles
Year	Venue	Partner	Opponent	Score	Result
1996	Jakarta, Indonesia	(China) Qin Yiyuan	(China) Ge Fei (China) Gu Jun	6–15, 12–15	Silver
1997	Yogyakarta, Indonesia	(China) Qin Yiyuan	(China) Ge Fei (China) Gu Jun	10–15, 15–9, 9–15	Silver

=== Commonwealth Games ===
Women's doubles
Year	Venue	Partner	Opponent	Score	Result
2010	Siri Fort Sports Complex; New Delhi, India	(Australia) Kate Wilson-Smith	(India) Jwala Gutta (India) Ashwini Ponnappa	21–12, 13–21, 11–21	Bronze

=== Asian Games ===
Women's doubles
Year	Venue	Partner	Opponent	Score	Result
1998	Thammasat Gymnasium 2 Bangkok, Thailand	(China) Qin Yiyuan	(Indonesia) Eliza Nathanael (Indonesia) Deyana Lomban	10–15, 5–15	Bronze

=== Asian Championships ===
Women's doubles
Year	Venue	Partner	Opponent	Score	Result
1995	Beijing, China	(China) Qin Yiyuan	(China) Ge Fei (China) Gu Jun	1–15, 4–15	Silver
1998	Bangkok, Thailand	(China) Qin Yiyuan	(China) Ge Fei (China) Gu Jun	8–15, 7–15	Silver

Mixed doubles
Year	Venue	Partner	Opponent	Score	Result
1998	Bangkok, Thailand	(China) Chen Gang	(South Korea) Kim Dong-moon (South Korea) Ra Kyung-min	1–15, 10–15	Bronze

=== Oceania Championships ===
Women's doubles
Year	Venue	Partner	Opponent	Score	Result
2014	Ken Kay Badminton Stadium; Ballarat, Australia	(Australia) Renuga Veeran	(Australia) Jacinta Joe (Australia) Louisa Ma	Walkover	Bronze

=== Asian Cup ===
Women's doubles
Year	Venue	Partner	Opponent	Score	Result
1995	Qingdao, China	(China) Qin Yiyuan	(China) Ge Fei (China) Gu Jun	8–15, 6–15	Bronze

=== World Junior Championships ===
The Bimantara World Junior Championships was an international invitation badminton tournament for junior players. It was held in Jakarta, Indonesia from 1987 to 1991.

Girls' doubles
Year	Venue	Partner	Opponent	Score	Result
1992	Istora Senayan, Jakarta, Indonesia	(China) Yuan Yali	(China) Gu Jun (China) Han Jingna	9–15, 5–15	Silver

=== IBF/BWF World Grand Prix ===
The BWF Grand Prix had two levels, the Grand Prix and Grand Prix Gold. It was a series of badminton tournaments sanctioned by the Badminton World Federation (BWF) and played between 2007 and 2017.The World Badminton Grand Prix sanctioned by International Badminton Federation (IBF) from 1983 to 2006.

Women's doubles
Year	Tournament	Partner	Opponent	Score	Result
1994	Dutch Open	(China) Qin Yiyuan	(China) Peng Xinyong (China) Zhang Jin	4–15, 7–15	(silver) Runner-up
1995	Indonesia Open	(China) Qin Yiyuan	(China) Ge Fei (China) Gu Jun	6–15, 6–15	(silver) Runner-up
1995	Canadian Open	(China) Qin Yiyuan	(South Korea) Gil Young-ah (South Korea) Jang Hye-ock	10–15, 4–15	(silver) Runner-up
1996	China Open	(China) Qin Yiyuan	(South Korea) Kim Mee-hyang (South Korea) Park Soo-yun	15–2, 15–12	(gold) Winner
1997	Korea Open	(China) Qin Yiyuan	(China) Ge Fei (China) Gu Jun	10–15, 10–15	(silver) Runner-up
1997	U.S. Open	(China) Qin Yiyuan	(Japan) Yoshiko Iwata (Japan) Haruko Matsuda	15–6, 15–2	(gold) Winner
1997	China Open	(China) Qin Yiyuan	(China) Ge Fei (China) Gu Jun	13–15, 11–15	(silver) Runner-up
1997	Thailand Open	(China) Qin Yiyuan	(Indonesia) Eliza Nathanael (Indonesia) Zelin Resiana	15–8, 15–2	(gold) Winner
1997	Grand Prix Finals	(China) Qin Yiyuan	(China) Ge Fei (China) Gu Jun	1–15, 8–15	(silver) Runner-up
1998	Japan Open	(China) Qin Yiyuan	(China) Ge Fei (China) Gu Jun	Walkover	(silver) Runner-up
1998	Singapore Open	(China) Qin Yiyuan	(China) Ge Fei (China) Gu Jun	8–15, 13–15	(silver) Runner-up
1998	Denmark Open	(China) Qin Yiyuan	(China) Huang Nanyan (China) Yang Wei	15–17, 15–10, 15–11	(gold) Winner
2009	Australian Open	(Australia) Huang Chia-chi	(India) Aparna Balan (India) Shruti Kurian	21–13, 21–9	(gold) Winner
2014	New Zealand Open	(Australia) Renuga Veeran	(Japan) Shizuka Matsuo (Japan) Mami Naito	21–13, 10–21, 21–18	(gold) Winner

Mixed doubles
Year	Tournament	Partner	Opponent	Score	Result
1998	Swedish Open	(China) Chen Gang	(South Korea) Kim Dong-moon (South Korea) Ra Kyung-min	3–15, 3–15	(silver) Runner-up

BWF Grand Prix Gold tournament
BWF & IBF Grand Prix tournament
IBF Grand Prix Finals tournament

=== BWF International Challenge/Series ===
Women's doubles
Year	Tournament	Partner	Opponent	Score	Result
2010	Altona International	(Australia) Renuga Veeran	(Australia) Leanne Choo (Australia) Kate Wilson-Smith	21–15, 21–15	(gold) Winner
2013	Welsh International	(Australia) Renuga Veeran	(Indonesia) Keshya Nurvita Hanadia (Indonesia) Devi Tika Permatasari	21–15, 21–12	(gold) Winner
2013	Italian International	(Australia) Renuga Veeran	(Netherlands) Eefje Muskens (Netherlands) Selena Piek	10–21, 8–21	(silver) Runner-up
2014	Maribyrnong International	(Australia) Renuga Veeran	(Chinese Taipei) Chiang Mei-hui (Indonesia) Setyana Mapasa	21–19, 25–23	(gold) Winner

Mixed doubles
Year	Tournament	Partner	Opponent	Score	Result
2013	Victorian International	(Australia) Robin Middleton	(Australia) Ross Smith (Australia) Renuga Veeran	21–19, 19–21, 21–19	(gold) Winner

BWF International Challenge tournament
BWF International Series tournament
BWF Future Series tournament
