= Kuala Lumpur Badminton Stadium =

Stadium in Cheras, Kuala Lumpur, Malaysia

Coordinates: 3°7′10″N 101°43′39″E

- Stadium Badminton Kuala Lumpur
- Interactive map of Kuala Lumpur Badminton Stadium
- Location: Cheras, Kuala Lumpur, Malaysia
- Owner: Kuala Lumpur City Hall

Construction
- Opened: 1990
- Demolished: 2017

The Kuala Lumpur Badminton Stadium (Malay: Stadium Badminton Kuala Lumpur) was a now-demolished badminton arena located in Cheras, Kuala Lumpur, Malaysia. The stadium created new national badminton players including Liew Daren, Goh V Shem and Soniia Cheah.

== History ==
Built in 1990, the stadium can hold 4,500 spectators. The stadium was used as the headquarters of Badminton Asia Confederation and was also the base of Badminton World Federation from 2005 to 2006 until BWF decided move to Putra Indoor Stadium, Bukit Jalil.

Located right next to Jalan Cheras, the stadium, along with the Kuala Lumpur Hockey Stadium, was bought by local developer Mah Sing and demolished in 2017 for "other developments". The demolished stadium, owned by the Kuala Lumpur City Hall, was replaced by a newer facility called Arena Badminton DBKL, opened on 28 June 2023.
