= 1997 IBF World Championships – Mixed doubles =

Mixed doubles at the 1997 IBF World Championships
- Venue: Scotstoun Centre
- Location: Glasgow, Scotland
- Dates: May 24, 1997 – June 1, 1997

Medalists
gold medal	Liu Yong; Ge Fei	China
silver medal	Jens Eriksen; Marlene Thomsen	Denmark
bronze medal	Trikus Heryanto; Minarti Timur	Indonesia
bronze medal	Michael Søgaard; Rikke Olsen	Denmark

The 10th IBF World Championships (Badminton) were held in Glasgow, Scotland, between 24 May and 1 June 1997. Following the results of the mixed doubles.

== Main stage ==
=== Section 1 ===
First round
(China) Liu Yong (China) Ge Fei	15	15
(Malaysia) Norhasikin Amin (Malaysia) Chang Kim Wai	1	2
(Ukraine) Vladislav Druzchenko (Ukraine) Viktoria Evtushenko	15	10	15
(Chinese Taipei) Jeng Shwu-Zen (Chinese Taipei) Lee Sung-Yuan	0	15	8
(England) Simon Archer (England) Julie Bradbury	15	15
(Australia) Peter Blackburn (Australia) Rhonda Cator	5	3
(Indonesia) Finarsih (Indonesia) Sandiarto	15	15
(France) Vincent Laigle (France) Tatiana Vattier	8	7
(South Korea) Lee Dong-soo (South Korea) Yim Kyung-jin	15	15
(Sweden) Henrik Andersson (Sweden) Johanna Holgersson	6	9
(Ukraine) Valerij Strelcov (Ukraine) Elena Nozdran	15	17
(Scotland) Russell Hogg (Scotland) Alexis Barlow	5	3
(Denmark) Thomas Stavngaard (Denmark) Ann Jørgensen	15	15
(Hong Kong) Ma Che Kong (Hong Kong) Tung Chau Man	7	12
(Canada) Iain Sydie (Canada) Denyse Julien	15	15
(Spain) Arturo Ruiz (Spain) Esther Sanz	7	4

Second round
(China) Liu Yong (China) Ge Fei	15	15
(Ukraine) Vladislav Druzchenko (Ukraine) Viktoria Evtushenko	7	2
(England) Simon Archer (England) Julie Bradbury	15	15
(Indonesia) Finarsih (Indonesia) Sandiarto	6	10
(South Korea) Lee Dong-soo (South Korea) Yim Kyung-jin	15	15
(Ukraine) Valerij Strelcov (Ukraine) Elena Nozdran	0	3
(Denmark) Thomas Stavngaard (Denmark) Ann Jørgensen	17	15
(Canada) Iain Sydie (Canada) Denyse Julien	7	8

Third round
(China) Liu Yong (China) Ge Fei	15	15
(England) Simon Archer (England) Julie Bradbury	8	5
(South Korea) Lee Dong-soo (South Korea) Yim Kyung-jin	17	15
(Denmark) Thomas Stavngaard (Denmark) Ann Jørgensen	15	1

Quarterfinals
(China) Liu Yong (China) Ge Fei	15	18
(South Korea) Lee Dong-soo (South Korea) Yim Kyung-jin	6	14

=== Section 2 ===
First round
(Denmark) Michael Søgaard (Denmark) Rikke Olsen	15	15
(Russia) Nikolaj Nikolaenko (Russia) Elena Sukhareva	4	3
(China) Zhang Jin (China) Yang Ming	15	15
(Hong Kong) Ling Wan Ting (Hong Kong) Tam Kai Chuen	9	5
(Sweden) Jens Olsson (Sweden) Astrid Crabo	15	15
(Canada) Bryan Moody (Canada) Moira Ong	5	3
(Germany) Stephan Kuhl (Germany) Nicol Pitro	13	15	15
(England) Anthony Clark (England) Joanne Wright	18	12	6
(Indonesia) Imam Tohari (Indonesia) Emma Ermawati	15	15
(Australia) David Bamford (Australia) Kellie Lucas	8	4
(United States) Mike Edstrom (United States) Eileen Tang	15	15
(Portugal) Hugo Rodrigues (Portugal) Ana Ferreira	10	10
(Netherlands) Quinten van Dalm (Netherlands) Nicole van Hooren	15	14	15
(Malaysia) Chor Hooi Yee (Malaysia) Pang Cheh Chang	5	18	12
(Belarus) Mikhail Korshuk (Belarus) Tatiana Gerassimovitch	15	15
(France) Sydney Lengagne (France) Christelle Szynal	13	9

Second round
(Denmark) Michael Søgaard (Denmark) Rikke Olsen	15	15
(China) Zhang Jin (China) Yang Ming	7	9
(Sweden) Jens Olsson (Sweden) Astrid Crabo	15	15
(Germany) Stephan Kuhl (Germany) Nicol Pitro	4	10
(Indonesia) Imam Tohari (Indonesia) Emma Ermawati	15	15
(United States) Mike Edstrom (United States) Eileen Tang	7	6
(Netherlands) Quinten van Dalm (Netherlands) Nicole van Hooren	15	15
(Belarus) Mikhail Korshuk (Belarus) Tatiana Gerassimovitch	4	3

Third round
(Denmark) Michael Søgaard (Denmark) Rikke Olsen	17	16	15
(Sweden) Jens Olsson (Sweden) Astrid Crabo	14	18	5
(Indonesia) Imam Tohari (Indonesia) Emma Ermawati	17	15	18
(Netherlands) Quinten van Dalm (Netherlands) Nicole van Hooren	18	10	14

Quarterfinals
(Denmark) Michael Søgaard (Denmark) Rikke Olsen	15	15
(Indonesia) Imam Tohari (Indonesia) Emma Ermawati	12	7

=== Section 3 ===
First round
(Denmark) Jens Eriksen (Denmark) Marlene Thomsen	15	15
(Scotland) Kenny Middlemiss (Scotland) Elinor Middlemiss	0	3
(Belarus) Vitali Shmakov (Belarus) Vlada Tcherniavskaia	4	15	15
(Chinese Taipei) Lee Wei-Jen (Chinese Taipei) Tsai Hui-Min	15	6	9
(China) Qian Hong (China) Tao Xiaoqiang	15	15
(Japan) Norio Imai (Japan) Satomi Igawa	4	4
(England) Chris Hunt (England) Donna Kellogg	15	15
(Wales) Richard Vaughan (Wales) Kelly Morgan	3	2
(Sweden) Peter Axelsson (Sweden) Catrine Bengtsson	15	15
(Japan) Hiroshi Ohyama (Japan) Hiroko Nagamine	6	2
(Indonesia) Flandy Limpele (Indonesia) Eti Tantra	15	15
(Bulgaria) Svetoslav Stoyanov (Bulgaria) Rayna Tzvetkova	4	7
(Germany) Michael Keck (Netherlands) Erica van den Heuvel	15	15
(South Korea) Chung Jae-hee (South Korea) Kim Yong-hyun	9	6
(Australia) Murray Hocking (Australia) Lisa Campbell	15	15
(Poland) Damian Pławecki (Poland) Katarzyna Krasowska	5	10

Second round
(Denmark) Jens Eriksen (Denmark) Marlene Thomsen	15	15
(Belarus) Vitali Shmakov (Belarus) Vlada Tcherniavskaia	2	6
(China) Qian Hong (China) Tao Xiaoqiang	15	15
(England) Chris Hunt (England) Donna Kellogg	10	12
(Sweden) Peter Axelsson (Sweden) Catrine Bengtsson	15	15
(Indonesia) Flandy Limpele (Indonesia) Eti Tantra	6	4
(Germany) Michael Keck (Netherlands) Erica van den Heuvel	15	15
(Australia) Murray Hocking (Australia) Lisa Campbell	8	5

Third round
(Denmark) Jens Eriksen (Denmark) Marlene Thomsen	15	15
(China) Qian Hong (China) Tao Xiaoqiang	9	12
(Sweden) Peter Axelsson (Sweden) Catrine Bengtsson	15	15
(Germany) Michael Keck (Netherlands) Erica van den Heuvel	11	7

Quarterfinals
(Denmark) Jens Eriksen (Denmark) Marlene Thomsen	15	15
(Sweden) Peter Axelsson (Sweden) Catrine Bengtsson	12	2

=== Section 4 ===
First round
(Indonesia) Tri Kusharyanto (Indonesia) Minarti Timur	15	15
(New Zealand) Nick Hall (New Zealand) Nicole Gordon	2	5
(Russia) Nikolaj Zuev (Russia) Marina Yakusheva	15	15
(Hong Kong) Chow Kin Man (Hong Kong) Louisa Koon Wai Chee	3	8
(Canada) Mike Beres (Canada) Robbyn Hermitage	15	15
(Germany) Christian Mohr (Germany) Kerstin Ubben	9	4
(Slovenia) Andrej Pohar (Slovenia) Maja Pohar	15	15
(France) Manuel Dubrulle (France) Sandrine Lefèvre	9	10
(South Korea) Kim Dong-moon (South Korea) Ra Kyung-min	15	15
(Denmark) Jon Holst-Christensen (Germany) Karen Stechmann	5	11
(South Korea) Ha Tae-kwon (South Korea) Kim Shin-young	15	15
(Malaysia) Chan Chong Ming (Malaysia) Lim Pek Siah	1	10
(China) Chen Xingdong (China) Gu Jun	15	15
(England) John Quinn (England) Lorraine Cole	11	9
(Netherlands) Norbert van Barneveld (Netherlands) Lotte Jonathans	15	18
(Canada) Jean Philippe Goyette (Canada) Elma Ong	8	14

Second round
(Indonesia) Tri Kusharyanto (Indonesia) Minarti Timur	15	15
(Russia) Nikolaj Zuev (Russia) Marina Yakusheva	8	5
(Canada) Mike Beres (Canada) Robbyn Hermitage	15	15
(Slovenia) Andrej Pohar (Slovenia) Maja Pohar	8	7
(South Korea) Kim Dong-moon (South Korea) Ra Kyung-min	15	15
(South Korea) Ha Tae-kwon (South Korea) Kim Shin-young	1	1
(China) Chen Xingdong (China) Gu Jun	15	15
(Netherlands) Norbert van Barneveld (Netherlands) Lotte Jonathans	9	4

Third round
(Indonesia) Tri Kusharyanto (Indonesia) Minarti Timur	15	15
(Canada) Mike Beres (Canada) Robbyn Hermitage	7	4
(South Korea) Kim Dong-moon (South Korea) Ra Kyung-min	15	15
(China) Chen Xingdong (China) Gu Jun	7	4

Quarterfinals
(Indonesia) Tri Kusharyanto (Indonesia) Minarti Timur	15	15
(South Korea) Kim Dong-moon (South Korea) Ra Kyung-min	12	7

== Final stage ==
Quarterfinals
4	(China) Liu Yong (China) Ge Fei	15	18
(South Korea) Lee Dong-soo (South Korea) Yim Kyung-jin	6	14
2	(Denmark) Michael Søgaard (Denmark) Rikke Olsen	15	15
(Indonesia) Imam Tohari (Indonesia) Emma Ermawati	12	7
3	(Denmark) Jens Eriksen (Denmark) Marlene Thomsen	15	15
(Sweden) Peter Axelsson (Sweden) Catrine Bengtsson	12	2
1	(Indonesia) Tri Kusharyanto (Indonesia) Minarti Timur	15	15
(South Korea) Kim Dong-moon (South Korea) Ra Kyung-min	12	7

Semifinals
4	(China) Liu Yong (China) Ge Fei	15	15
2	(Denmark) Michael Søgaard (Denmark) Rikke Olsen	10	9
3	(Denmark) Jens Eriksen (Denmark) Marlene Thomsen	8	15	17
1	(Indonesia) Tri Kusharyanto (Indonesia) Minarti Timur	13	15

Finals
4	(China) Liu Yong (China) Ge Fei	15	16	15
3	(Denmark) Jens Eriksen (Denmark) Marlene Thomsen	5	17	4
