= Badminton at the 2000 Summer Olympics – Women's doubles =

Women's doubles at the Games of the XXVII Olympiad
- Venue: Pavilion 3, Sydney Olympic Park
- Date: 16 – 21 September 2000
- Competitors: 26 pairs from 17 nations

Medalists
1st place, gold medalist(s)		Ge Fei; Gu Jun	China
2nd place, silver medalist(s)		Huang Nanyan; Yang Wei	China
3rd place, bronze medalist(s)		Gao Ling; Qin Yiyuan	China

These are the results for the women's doubles badminton tournament of 2000 Summer Olympics. The tournament was single-elimination. Matches consisted of three sets, with sets being to 15 for women's doubles. The tournament was held at Pavilion 3, Sydney Olympic Park.

== Seeds ==
1. Ge Fei and Gu Jun (CHN) (gold medalist)
2. Huang Nanyan and Yang Wei (CHN) (silver medalist)
3. Chung Jae-hee and Ra Kyung-min (KOR) (fourth place)
4. Joanne Goode and Donna Kellogg (GBR) (quarterfinals)
5. Helene Kirkegaard and Rikke Olsen (DEN) (quarterfinals)
6. Gao Ling and Qin Yiyuan (CHN) (bronze medalist)
7. Lotte Jonathans and Nicole van Hooren (NED) (quarterfinals)
8. Etty Tantri and Cynthia Tuwankotta (INA) (quarterfinals)

== Results ==
Section	Name	Country
Top	Ge Fei and Gu Jun	China
Top	Lee Hyo-jung and Yim Kyung-jin	South Korea
Top	Chen Li-chin and Tsai Hui-min	Chinese Taipei
Top	Etty Tantri and Cynthia Tuwankotta	Indonesia
Top	Ann-Lou Jørgensen and Mette Schjoldager	Denmark
Top	Victoria Evtoushenko and Elena Nozdran	Ukraine
Top	Joanne Goode and Donna Kellogg	Great Britain
Top	Milaine Cloutier and Robbyn Hermitage	Canada
Top	Rhonda Cator and Amanda Hardy	Australia
Top	Gao Ling and Qin Yiyuan	China
Top	Neli Boteva and Diana Koleva	Bulgaria
Top	Yoshiko Iwata and Haruko Matsuda	Japan
Top	Marie-Helene Pierre and Amrita Sawaram	Mauritius
Bottom	Irina Ruslyakova and Marina Yakusheva	Russia
Bottom	Satomi Igawa and Hiroko Nagamine	Japan
Bottom	Helene Kirkegaard and Rikke Olsen	Denmark
Bottom	Koon Wai Chee and Ling Wan Ting	Hong Kong
Bottom	Joanne Davies and Sarah Hardaker	Great Britain
Bottom	Deyana Lomban and Eliza Nathanael	Indonesia
Bottom	Chung Jae-hee and Ra Kyung-min	South Korea
Bottom	Nicole Grether and Karen Neumann	Germany
Bottom	Ann Jørgensen and Majken Vange	Denmark
Bottom	Lotte Jonathans and Nicole van Hooren	Netherlands
Bottom	Sujitra Ekmongkolpaisarn and Saralee Thungthongkam	Thailand
Bottom	Rayoni Head and Kellie Lucas	Australia
Bottom	Huang Nanyan and Yang Wei	China

== Draw ==
=== Final ===
Semifinals
1	Ge Fei (CHN); Gu Jun (CHN)	15	15
6	Gao Ling (CHN); Qin Yiyuan (CHN)	7	12
3	Chung Jae-hee (KOR); Ra Kyung-min (KOR)	6	11
2	Huang Nanyan (CHN); Yang Wei (CHN)	15	15

Final
1	Ge Fei (CHN); Gu Jun (CHN)	15	15
2	Huang Nanyan (CHN); Yang Wei (CHN)	5	5
Bronze-medal match
6	Gao Ling (CHN); Qin Yiyuan (CHN)	15	15
3	Chung Jae-hee (KOR); Ra Kyung-min (KOR)	10	4

=== Top half ===
Round 1
1	Ge Fei (CHN); Gu Jun (CHN)
bye
Lee Hyo-jung (KOR); Yim Kyung-jin (KOR)	15	8	15
Chen Li-chin (TPE); Tsai Hui-min (TPE)	11	15	12
8	Etty Tantri (INA); Cynthia Tuwankotta (INA)
bye
Ann-Lou Jørgensen (DEN); Mette Schjoldager (DEN)	15	11	15
Victoria Evtoushenko (UKR); Elena Nozdran (UKR)	3	15	11
4	Joanne Goode (GBR); Donna Kellogg (GBR)
bye
Milaine Cloutier (CAN); Robbyn Hermitage (CAN)	15	15
Rhonda Cator (AUS); Amanda Hardy (AUS)	13	6
6	Gao Ling (CHN); Qin Yiyuan (CHN)	15	15
Neli Boteva (BUL); Diana Koleva (BUL)	1	9
Yoshiko Iwata (JPN); Haruko Matsuda (JPN)	15	15
Marie-Helene Pierre (MRI); Amrita Sawaram (MRI)	2	2

Round 2
1	Ge Fei (CHN); Gu Jun (CHN)	15	15
Lee Hyo-jung (KOR); Yim Kyung-jin (KOR)	3	5
8	Etty Tantri (INA); Cynthia Tuwankotta (INA)	17	15
Ann-Lou Jørgensen (DEN); Mette Schjoldager (DEN)	16	10
4	Joanne Goode (GBR); Donna Kellogg (GBR)	15	15
Milaine Cloutier (CAN); Robbyn Hermitage (CAN)	4	10
6	Gao Ling (CHN); Qin Yiyuan (CHN)	15	15
Yoshiko Iwata (JPN); Haruko Matsuda (JPN)	5	5

Quarterfinals
1	Ge Fei (CHN); Gu Jun (CHN)	15	15
8	Etty Tantri (INA); Cynthia Tuwankotta (INA)	3	5
4	Joanne Goode (GBR); Donna Kellogg (GBR)	2	7
6	Gao Ling (CHN); Qin Yiyuan (CHN)	15	15

Semifinals
1	Ge Fei (CHN); Gu Jun (CHN)
6	Gao Ling (CHN); Qin Yiyuan (CHN)

=== Bottom half ===
Round 1
Irina Ruslyakova (RUS); Marina Yakusheva (RUS)	15	15
Satomi Igawa (JPN); Hiroko Nagamine (JPN)	9	11
5	Helene Kirkegaard (DEN); Rikke Olsen (DEN)	15	13	15
Koon Wai Chee (HKG); Ling Wan Ting (HKG)	9	15	5
Joanne Davies (GBR); Sarah Hardaker (GBR)	15	15
Deyana Lomban (INA); Eliza Nathanael (INA)	13	11
bye
3	Chung Jae-hee (KOR); Ra Kyung-min (KOR)
Nicole Grether (GER); Karen Neumann (GER)	15	15
Ann Jørgensen (DEN); Majken Vange (DEN)	13	6
bye
7	Lotte Jonathans (NED); Nicole van Hooren (NED)
Sujitra Ekmongkolpaisarn (THA); Saralee Thungthongkam (THA)	15	15
Rayoni Head (AUS); Kellie Lucas (AUS)	7	4
bye
2	Huang Nanyan (CHN); Yang Wei (CHN)

Round 2
Irina Ruslyakova (RUS); Marina Yakusheva (RUS)	16	5
5	Helene Kirkegaard (DEN); Rikke Olsen (DEN)	17	15
Joanne Davies (GBR); Sarah Hardaker (GBR)	6	1
3	Chung Jae-hee (KOR); Ra Kyung-min (KOR)	15	15
Nicole Grether (GER); Karen Neumann (GER)	7	4
7	Lotte Jonathans (NED); Nicole van Hooren (NED)	15	15
Sujitra Ekmongkolpaisarn (THA); Saralee Thungthongkam (THA)	1	4
2	Huang Nanyan (CHN); Yang Wei (CHN)	15	15

Quarterfinals
5	Helene Kirkegaard (DEN); Rikke Olsen (DEN)	15	12	5
3	Chung Jae-hee (KOR); Ra Kyung-min (KOR)	12	15	15
7	Lotte Jonathans (NED); Nicole van Hooren (NED)	10	12
2	Huang Nanyan (CHN); Yang Wei (CHN)	15	15

Semifinals
3	Chung Jae-hee (KOR); Ra Kyung-min (KOR)
2	Huang Nanyan (CHN); Yang Wei (CHN)
