= 2001 Indonesia Open (badminton) =

Tournament details
- Dates: 25 July 2001 – 29 July 2001
- Edition: 20th
- Level: World Grand Prix 5 Stars
- Total prize money: US$170,000
- Venue: Istora Senayan
- Location: Jakarta, Indonesia

Champions
- Men's singles: (Indonesia) Marleve Mainaky
- Women's singles: (Indonesia) Ellen Angelina
- Men's doubles: (Indonesia) Candra Wijaya (Indonesia) Sigit Budiarto
- Women's doubles: (Indonesia) Deyana Lomban (Indonesia) Vita Marissa
- Mixed doubles: (Indonesia) Tri Kusharjanto (Indonesia) Emma Ermawati

The 2001 Indonesia Open (officially known as the Sanyo Indonesia Open 2001 for sponsorship reasons) in badminton was held in Jakarta, from July 25 to July 29, 2001. It was a four-star tournament and the prize money was US$150,000.

== Venue ==
- Senayan

== Final results ==
Category	Winners	Runners-up	Score
Men's singles	(Indonesia) Marleve Mainaky	(Malaysia) Lee Tsuen Seng	6–8, 7–5, 7–3, 7–3
Women's singles	(Indonesia) Ellen Angelina	(China) Wang Chen	7–5, 7–3, 5–7, 7–4
Men's doubles	(Indonesia) Candra Wijaya & Sigit Budiarto	(Indonesia) Tony Gunawan & Halim Haryanto	7–2, 7–3, 7–5
Women's doubles	(Indonesia) Deyana Lomban & Vita Marissa	(Denmark) Ann-Lou Jørgensen & Jane F. Bramsen	7–5, 7–5, 7–3
Mixed doubles	(Indonesia) Tri Kusharjanto & Emma Ermawati	(Indonesia) Nova Widianto & Vita Marissa	7–5, 7–1, 2–7, 7–1

== Results ==
=== Men's singles ===
Quarterfinals
(South Korea) Lee Hyun-il	7	1	7	7
(Malaysia) James Chua	3	7	4	3
(Malaysia) Lee Tsuen Seng	7	7	2	7	7
(England) Colin Haughton	3	8	7	2	2
(Indonesia) Marleve Mainaky	7	7	7
(Hong Kong) Agus Hariyanto	2	4	3
(Indonesia) Sony Dwi Kuncoro	7	7	4	5	3
(India) Pullela Gopichand	3	0	7	7	7

Semifinals
(South Korea) Lee Hyun-il	5	5	4
(Malaysia) Lee Tsuen Seng	7	7	7
(Indonesia) Marleve Mainaky	7	8	7
(India) Pullela Gopichand	2	6	1

Final
(Malaysia) Lee Tsuen Seng	8	5	3	3
(Indonesia) Marleve Mainaky	6	7	7	7

=== Women's singles ===
Quarterfinals
(China) Wang Chen	7	7	7
(Malaysia) Ng Mee Fen	4	4	0
(Japan) Mika Anjo	0	3	0
(Indonesia) Cindana Hartono	7	7	7
(Indonesia) Ellen Angelina	7	7	7
(Japan) Maiko Naka	1	2	1
(Hong Kong) Louisa Koon Wai Chee	4	7	7	2	1
(Indonesia) Lidya Djaelawijaya	7	5	3	7	7

Semifinals
(China) Wang Chen	5	7	7
(Indonesia) Cindana Hartono	7	3	1	2
(Indonesia) Ellen Angelina	7	7	8
(Indonesia) Lidya Djaelawijaya	4	3	6

Final
(China) Wang Chen	5	3	7	4
(Indonesia) Ellen Angelina	7	7	5	7

=== Men's doubles ===
Quarterfinals
(Indonesia) Bambang Supriyanto (Indonesia) Tri Kusharyanto	7	7	1 ret.
(Indonesia) Tony Gunawan (Indonesia) Halim Haryanto	5	2	0
(Malaysia) Jeremy Gan (Malaysia) Hong Chien Hun	7	8	5	4	2
(Indonesia) Davis Efraim (Indonesia) Karel Mainaky	1	7	7	7	7
(Indonesia) Reony Mainaky (Japan) Masafumi Hanada	7	6	5	7	7
(Indonesia) Ade Lukas (Indonesia) Andreas Setiawan	0	8	7	5	3
(Indonesia) Alven Yulianto (Indonesia) Hendra Aprida Gunawan	5	2	0
(Indonesia) Candra Wijaya (Indonesia) Sigit Budiarto	7	7	7

Semifinals
(Indonesia) Tony Gunawan (Indonesia) Halim Haryanto	7	7	7
(Indonesia) Davis Efraim (Indonesia) Karel Mainaky	4	4	3
(Indonesia) Reony Mainaky (Japan) Masafumi Hanada	3	4	6
(Indonesia) Candra Wijaya (Indonesia) Sigit Budiarto	7	7	8

Final
(Indonesia) Tony Gunawan (Indonesia) Halim Haryanto	2	3	5
(Indonesia) Candra Wijaya (Indonesia) Sigit Budiarto	7	7	7

=== Women's doubles ===
Quarterfinals
(Indonesia) Eny Erlangga (Indonesia) Jo Novita	3	7	5	7	7
(Indonesia) Lita Nurlita (Indonesia) Endang Nursugianti	7	1	7	2	1
(Denmark) Majken Vange (Denmark) Pernille Harder	5	4	3
(Indonesia) Deyana Lomban (Indonesia) Vita Marissa	7	7	7
(Indonesia) Emma Ermawati (Indonesia) Eny Widiowati	7	7	5	7
(Indonesia) Yunita Tetty (Indonesia) Ninna Ernita	1	4	7	2
(Indonesia) Diah Novita (Indonesia) Rossy Riani	1	0	0
(Denmark) Ann-Lou Jørgensen (Denmark) Jane F. Bramsen	7	7	7

Semifinals
(Indonesia) Eny Erlangga (Indonesia) Jo Novita	5	7	7	3	3
(Indonesia) Deyana Lomban (Indonesia) Vita Marissa	7	5	5	7	7
(Indonesia) Emma Ermawati (Indonesia) Eny Widiowati	3	2	2
(Denmark) Ann-Lou Jørgensen (Denmark) Jane F. Bramsen	7	7	7

Final
(Indonesia) Deyana Lomban (Indonesia) Vita Marissa	7	7	7
(Denmark) Ann-Lou Jørgensen (Denmark) Jane F. Bramsen	5	5	3

=== Mixed doubles ===
Quarterfinals
(Indonesia) Tri Kusharyanto (Indonesia) Emma Ermawati	7	7	7
(Denmark) Michael Lamp (Denmark) Ann-Lou Jorgensen	5	0	4
(England) Nathan Robertson (England) Gail Emms	7	7	5	7
(Indonesia) Bambang Suprianto (Indonesia) Minarti Timur	4	3	7	4
(Indonesia) Nova Widianto (Indonesia) Vita Marissa	7	7	7
(Indonesia) Wahyu Agung (Indonesia) Ninna Ernita	2	2	0
(Denmark) Jonas Rasmussen (Denmark) Jane Bramsen	4	3	7	7	2
(Sweden) Fredrik Bergström (Sweden) Jenny Karlsson	7	7	3	3	7

Semifinals
(Indonesia) Tri Kusharyanto (Indonesia) Emma Ermawati	1	7	7	7
(England) Nathan Robertson (England) Gail Emms	7	1	0	2
(Indonesia) Nova Widianto (Indonesia) Vita Marissa	8	8	7
(Sweden) Fredrik Bergström (Sweden) Jenny Karlsson	7	7	3

Final
(Indonesia) Tri Kusharyanto (Indonesia) Emma Ermawati	7	7	2	7
(Indonesia) Nova Widianto (Indonesia) Vita Marissa	5	1	7	1

Preceded by 2000 Indonesia Open	Indonesia Open	Succeeded by 2002 Indonesia Open
