= Badminton at the 1998 Asian Games – Mixed doubles =

Mixed doubles at the 1998 Asian Games
- Venue: Thammasat Gymnasium 2
- Dates: 13–17 December
- Competitors: 38 from 10 nations

Medalists
gold medal	Kim Dong-moon; Ra Kyung-min	South Korea
silver medal	Lee Dong-soo; Yim Kyung-jin	South Korea
bronze medal	Tri Kusharjanto; Minarti Timur	Indonesia
bronze medal	Zhang Jun; Qin Yiyuan	China

The badminton mixed doubles tournament at the 1998 Asian Games in Bangkok took place from 13 December to 17 December at Thammasat Gymnasium 2.

== Schedule ==
All times are Indochina Time (UTC+07:00)

Date	Time	Event
Sunday, 13 December 1998	13:00	1st round
Sunday, 13 December 1998	13:00	2nd round
Monday, 14 December 1998	13:00	2nd round
Tuesday, 15 December 1998	13:00	Quarterfinals
Wednesday, 16 December 1998	13:00	Semifinals
Thursday, 17 December 1998	13:00	Final

== Results ==
Legend

- WO — Won by walkover

=== Final ===
Final
	Lee Dong-soo (KOR); Yim Kyung-jin (KOR)	6	8
2	Kim Dong-moon (KOR); Ra Kyung-min (KOR)	15	15

=== Top half ===
1st round
Chang Jeng-shyuang (TPE); Chen Li-chin (TPE)	15	13	11
Wong Choong Hann (MAS); Chor Hooi Yee (MAS)	12	15	15

2nd round
1	Tri Kusharjanto (INA); Minarti Timur (INA)	15	15
Yau Kwun Yuen (HKG); Ng Ching (HKG)	1	3
Liu Yong (CHN); Ge Fei (CHN)	15	15
Seiichi Watanabe (JPN); Haruko Matsuda (JPN)	6	9
3	Tesana Panvisvas (THA); Saralee Thungthongkam (THA)	W	O
Ian Gil Piencenaves (PHI); Kennie Asuncion (PHI)
Lee Dong-soo (KOR); Yim Kyung-jin (KOR)	15	15
Wong Choong Hann (MAS); Chor Hooi Yee (MAS)	2	7

Quarterfinals
1	Tri Kusharjanto (INA); Minarti Timur (INA)	15	15
Liu Yong (CHN); Ge Fei (CHN)	7	6
3	Tesana Panvisvas (THA); Saralee Thungthongkam (THA)	12	12
Lee Dong-soo (KOR); Yim Kyung-jin (KOR)	15	15

Semifinals
1	Tri Kusharjanto (INA); Minarti Timur (INA)	16	9
Lee Dong-soo (KOR); Yim Kyung-jin (KOR)	17	15

=== Bottom half ===
1st round
Khunakorn Sudhisodhi (THA); Sujitra Ekmongkolpaisarn (THA)	15	15
Thushara Edirisinghe (SRI); Chandrika de Silva (SRI)	4	2
Chan Chong Ming (MAS); Joanne Quay (MAS)	15	15
Kennevic Asuncion (PHI); Amparo Lim (PHI)	0	11

2nd round
Khunakorn Sudhisodhi (THA); Sujitra Ekmongkolpaisarn (THA)	13	12
Zhang Jun (CHN); Qin Yiyuan (CHN)	15	15
Liu Kwok Wa (HKG); Koon Wai Chee (HKG)	17	9	15
4	Fumihiko Machida (JPN); Yasuko Mizui (JPN)	14	15	4
Chan Chong Ming (MAS); Joanne Quay (MAS)	15	15
Budi Santoso (INA); Meiluawati (INA)	10	5
Lee Wei-jen (TPE); Tsai Hui-min (TPE)	0	5
2	Kim Dong-moon (KOR); Ra Kyung-min (KOR)	15	15

Quarterfinals
Zhang Jun (CHN); Qin Yiyuan (CHN)	15	15
Liu Kwok Wa (HKG); Koon Wai Chee (HKG)	4	3
Chan Chong Ming (MAS); Joanne Quay (MAS)	3	4
2	Kim Dong-moon (KOR); Ra Kyung-min (KOR)	15	15

Semifinals
Zhang Jun (CHN); Qin Yiyuan (CHN)	3	6
2	Kim Dong-moon (KOR); Ra Kyung-min (KOR)	15	15
