= Kusharjanto =

Kusharjanto, Kusharyanto is an Indonesian surname. Notable people with the surname include:

- Rehan Naufal Kusharjanto (born 2000), Indonesian badminton player
- Tri Kusharjanto (born 1974), Indonesian badminton player
