= Imam Tohari =

Indonesian badminton player (born 1976)

Personal information
- Born: 26 June 1976 (age 50)
- Height: 1.80 m (5 ft 11 in)

Sport
- Country: Indonesia
- Sport: Badminton
- Handedness: Right
- BWF profile
Medal record
Men's badminton
Representing Indonesia
World Cup
Bronze medal – third place	1997 Yogyakarta	Mixed doubles

Imam Tohari (born 26 March 1976) is an Indonesian badminton coach, and former badminton player who specialized in doubles events. He was the mixed doubles bronze medalists at the 1997 World Cup partnered with Emma Ermawati.

After retired from the international tournament, Tohari started a new career as a coach in Tomioka, Japan in 2002. He managed to bring Kento Momota won the World Junior Championships in 2012. In April 2013, he was recruited PBSI to join the national team as a men's singles assistant coach, and in 2016, he began coaching in Djarum Kudus club.

== Achievements ==
=== World Cup ===
Mixed doubles
Year	Venue	Partner	Opponent	Score	Result	Ref.
1997	Among Rogo Sports Hall; Yogyakarta, Indonesia	(Indonesia) Emma Ermawati	(Indonesia) Tri Kusharjanto (Indonesia) Minarti Timur	4–15, 3–15	Bronze	

=== IBF World Grand Prix ===
The World Badminton Grand Prix sanctioned by International Badminton Federation (IBF) from 1983 to 2006.

Mixed doubles
Year	Tournament	Partner	Opponent	Score	Result	Ref.
1997	Polish Open	(Indonesia) Emma Ermawati	(Indonesia) Flandy Limpele (Indonesia) Etty Tantri	7–15, 6–15	(silver) Runner-up	
1997	India Open	(Indonesia) Emma Ermawati	(Malaysia) Lee Chee Leong (Malaysia) Lee Yin Yin	15–3, 15–9	(gold) Winner	

IBF Grand Prix tournament
IBF Grand Prix Finals tournament
