= 2001 Sudirman Cup =

Tournament details
- Dates: 28 May – 2 June
- Edition: 7th
- Level: International
- Venue: Palacio Municipal de Deportes San Pablo
- Location: Seville, Spain

The 2001 Sudirman Cup was the 7th tournament of the World Mixed Team Badminton Championships of Sudirman Cup. It was held from May 28 to June 2, 2001 in Seville, Spain.

== Teams ==
53 teams around the world took part in this tournament. Cyprus, Jordan, Mauritius and Nigeria withdrew from the competition.

== Group 1 ==
=== Group A ===
Team	Pld	W	L
China	2	2	0
(South Korea) Korea	2	1	1
Sweden	2	0	2

May 28, 2001
China	5–0	Sweden
May 29, 2001
Sweden	0–5	(South Korea) Korea
May 30, 2001
Korea (South Korea)	0–5	China

=== Group B ===
Team	Pld	W	L
Indonesia	2	2	0
Denmark	2	1	1
England	2	0	2

May 28, 2001
Denmark	5–0	England
May 29, 2001
Indonesia	4–1	England
May 30, 2001
Indonesia	3–2	Denmark

=== Play-offs ===
June 1, 2001	England	3–0	Sweden	5th/6th, loser relegate

=== Knockout stage ===
==== Semi-finals ====
Indonesia
3

1 June 2001

South Korea
1

			1	2	3
1	(Indonesia) (South Korea)	Taufik Hidayat; Lee Hyun-il	15; 11	15; 5
2	(Indonesia) (South Korea)	Lidya Djaelawijaya; Jun Jae-youn	4; 11	11; 9	13; 12
3	(Indonesia) (South Korea)	Tony Gunawan / Candra Wijaya; Lee Dong-soo / Yoo Yong-sung	15; 5	15; 7
4	(Indonesia) (South Korea)	Deyana Lomban / Eti Tantra; Lee Kyung-won / Ra Kyung-min				not played
5	(Indonesia) (South Korea)	Tri Kusharyanto / Vita Marissa; Kim Dong-moon / Ra Kyung-min	7; 15	7; 15

China
3

1 June 2001

Denmark
2

			1	2	3
1	(China) (Denmark)	Chen Hong; Peter Gade	15; 17	11; 15	15; 10
2	(China) (Denmark)	Gong Zhichao; Camilla Martin	11; 1	11; 0
3	(China) (Denmark)	Zhang Jun / Zhang Wei; Jens Eriksen / Jesper Larsen	15; 8	15; 9
4	(China) (Denmark)	Gao Ling / Huang Sui; Ann-Lou Jørgensen / Mette Schjoldager	15; 3	15; 2
5	(China) (Denmark)	Zhang Jun / Gao Ling; Michael Søgaard / Rikke Olsen	11; 15	8; 15

==== Final ====
China
3

2 June 2001

Indonesia
1

			1	2	3
1	(China) (Indonesia)	Zhang Jun / Zhang Wei; Tony Gunawan / Candra Wijaya	13; 15	1; 15
2	(China) (Indonesia)	Huang Sui / Gao Ling; Deyana Lomban / Etty Tantri	15; 1	15; 2
3	(China) (Indonesia)	Chen Hong; Hendrawan	15; 12	13; 15	15; 10
4	(China) (Indonesia)	Gong Zhichao; Yuli Marfuah	11; 2	11; 5
5	(China) (Indonesia)	Zhang Jun / Gao Ling; Bambang Suprianto / Minarti Timur				not played

2001 Sudirman Cup Champions

China
Fourth title

== Group 2 ==
=== Subgroup 2A ===
Team one	Team two	Score
Japan	Germany	5-0
Japan	Malaysia	3-2
Japan	Ukraine	4-1
Germany	Malaysia	2-3
Germany	Ukraine	4-1
Malaysia	Ukraine	4-1

=== Subgroup 2B ===
Team one	Team two	Score
Thailand	Netherlands	4-1
Thailand	Chinese Taipei	3-2
Thailand	Scotland	5-0
Netherlands	Chinese Taipei	3-2
Netherlands	Scotland	5-0
Chinese Taipei	Scotland	1-4

=== Playoff ===
Team one	Team two	Score	Notes
Thailand	Japan	3-1	7th-8th
Netherlands	Germany	3-0	9th-10th
Malaysia	Chinese Taipei	3-2	11th-12th
Ukraine	Scotland	3-0	13th-14th

== Group 3 ==
=== Subgroup 3A ===
Team one	Team two	Score
Canada	Russia	3-2
Canada	Finland	5-0
Canada	Norway	4-1
Russia	Finland	3-2
Russia	Norway	5-0
Finland	Norway	4-1

=== Subgroup 3B ===
Team one	Team two	Score
Hong Kong	India	4-1
Hong Kong	Wales	5-0
Hong Kong	Austria	5-0
India	Wales	4-1
India	Austria	5-0
Wales	Austria	4-1

=== Playoff ===
Team one	Team two	Score	Notes
Canada	Hong Kong	0-3	15th-16th
India	Russia	3-2	17th-18th
Finland	Wales	3-2	19th-20th
Austria	Norway	3-2	21st-22nd

== Group 4 ==
=== Subgroup 4A ===
Team one	Team two	Score
Singapore	New Zealand	4-1
Singapore	Poland	1-4
Singapore	Iceland	5-0
New Zealand	Poland	3-2
New Zealand	Iceland	5-0
Poland	Iceland	4-1

=== Subgroup 4B ===
Team one	Team two	Score
United States	Bulgaria	2-3
United States	France	3-2
United States	Switzerland	3-2
Bulgaria	France	3-2
Bulgaria	Switzerland	4-1
France	Switzerland	3-2

=== Playoff ===
Team one	Team two	Score	Notes
Singapore	United States	3-0	23rd-24th
New Zealand	Bulgaria	3-0	25th-26th
Poland	France	3-0	27th-28th
Switzerland	Iceland	3-1	29th-30th

== Group 5 ==
=== Subgroup 5A ===
Team one	Team two	Score
Spain	Belarus	3-2
Spain	Slovenia	3-2
Spain	Peru	4-1
Belarus	Slovenia	4-1
Belarus	Peru	5-0
Slovenia	Peru	3-2

=== Subgroup 5B ===
Team one	Team two	Score
Czech Republic	Belgium	3-2
Czech Republic	Portugal	3-2
Czech Republic	Israel	5-0
Belgium	Portugal	4-1
Belgium	Israel	3-2
Portugal	Israel	4-1

==== Playoff ====
Team one	Team two	Score	Notes
Spain	Czech Republic	3-1	31st-32nd
Belarus	Belgium	3-2	33rd-34th
Slovenia	Portugal	3-2	35th-36th
Peru	Israel	3-0	37th-38th

== Group 6 ==
=== Subgroup 6A ===
Team one	Team two	Score
Sri Lanka	Slovakia	3-2
Sri Lanka	Cyprus	3-2
Sri Lanka	Brazil	3-2
Slovakia	Cyprus	5-0
Slovakia	Brazil	4-1
Cyprus	Brazil	4-1

=== Subgroup 6B ===
Team one	Team two	Score
South Africa	Kazakhstan	4-1
South Africa	Estonia	4-1
South Africa	Lithuania	4-1
Kazakhstan	Estonia	4-1
Kazakhstan	Lithuania	4-1
Estonia	Lithuania	4-1

=== Playoff ===
Team one	Team two	Score	Notes
South Africa	Sri Lanka	3-2	39th-40th
Kazakhstan	Slovakia	3-2	41st-42nd
Estonia	Cyprus	3-1	43rd-44th
Lithuania	Brazil	3-1	45th-46th

== Group 7 ==
=== Subgroup 7A ===
Team one	Team two	Score
Luxembourg	Mexico	3-2
Luxembourg	Morocco	5-0
Luxembourg	Gibraltar (IBF Team)	5-0
Mexico	Morocco	5-0
Mexico	Gibraltar (IBF Team)	5-0
Morocco	Gibraltar (IBF Team)	3-2

=== Subgroup 7B ===
Team one	Team two	Score
Italy	Greece	4-1
Italy	Greenland	5-0
Greece	Greenland	3-2

=== Playoff ===
Team one	Team two	Score	Notes
Italy	Luxembourg	3-1	47th-48th
Greece	Mexico	3-2	49th-50th
Greenland	Morocco	3-1	51st-52nd
Gibraltar (IBF Team)			53rd

== Final classification ==
Group 1
Pos	Country
1	China
2	Indonesia
3	Denmark
4	(South Korea) Korea
5	England
6	Sweden

Group 2
Pos	Country
7	Thailand
8	Japan
9	Netherlands
10	Germany
11	Malaysia
12	Chinese Taipei
13	Ukraine
14	Scotland

Group 3
Pos	Country
15	Hong Kong
16	Canada
17	India
18	Russia
19	Finland
20	Wales
21	Austria
22	Norway

Group 4
Pos	Country
23	Singapore
24	United States
25	New Zealand
26	Bulgaria
27	Poland
28	France
29	Switzerland
30	Iceland

Group 5
Pos	Country
31	Spain
32	Czech Republic
33	Belarus
34	Belgium
35	Slovenia
36	Portugal
37	Peru
38	Israel

Group 6
Pos	Country
39	South Africa
40	Sri Lanka
41	Kazakhstan
42	Slovakia
43	Estonia
44	Cyprus
45	Lithuania
46	Brazil

Group 7
Pos	Country
47	Italy
48	Luxembourg
49	Greece
50	Mexico
51	Greenland
52	Morocco
53	Gibraltar (IBF Team)

Promoted to higher group
Relegated to lower group

== Notes ==
^1 Gibraltar competed as the neutral IBF Team in this competition due to Gibraltar dispute. An appeal by Gibraltar Badminton Association to compete with its own name and flag was rejected by Court of Arbitration for Sport.
