= 1997 Badminton World Cup =

Badminton championships

Tournament details
- Dates: 20–24 August 1997
- Edition: 19th
- Total prize money: US$200,000
- Venue: Among Rogo Sports Hall
- Location: Yogyakarta, Special Region of Yogyakarta, Indonesia

The 1997 Badminton World Cup was the nineteenth edition of an international tournament Badminton World Cup. The event was held in Yogyakarta, Indonesia from 20 to 24 August 1997. The tournament draw was released on 14 August 1997. Some new rules for intervals between the games were also introduced. China won 3 titles, while Indonesia finished with the titles in 2 disciplines.

== Medalists ==
Event	Gold	Silver	Bronze
Men's singles	(China) Sun Jun	(Indonesia) Joko Suprianto	(Malaysia) Ong Ewe Hock
Men's singles	(China) Sun Jun	(Indonesia) Joko Suprianto	(Indonesia) Indra Wijaya
Women's singles	(Indonesia) Susi Susanti	(China) Ye Zhaoying	(Indonesia) Mia Audina
Women's singles	(Indonesia) Susi Susanti	(China) Ye Zhaoying	(China) Gong Zhichao
Men's doubles	(Indonesia) Rexy Mainaky (Indonesia) Ricky Subagja	(South Korea) Lee Dong-soo (South Korea) Yoo Yong-sung	(Malaysia) Choong Tan Fook (Malaysia) Lee Wan Wah
Men's doubles	(Indonesia) Rexy Mainaky (Indonesia) Ricky Subagja	(South Korea) Lee Dong-soo (South Korea) Yoo Yong-sung	(Indonesia) Sigit Budiarto (Indonesia) Candra Wijaya
Women's doubles	(China) Ge Fei (China) Gu Jun	(China) Qin Yiyuan (China) Tang Yongshu	(Indonesia) Eliza Nathanael (Indonesia) Zelin Resiana
Women's doubles	(China) Ge Fei (China) Gu Jun	(China) Qin Yiyuan (China) Tang Yongshu	(Indonesia) Finarsih (Indonesia) Indarti Issolina
Mixed doubles	(China) Liu Yong (China) Ge Fei	(Indonesia) Trikus Heryanto (Indonesia) Minarti Timur	(Indonesia) Flandy Limpele (Indonesia) Rosalina Riseu
Mixed doubles	(China) Liu Yong (China) Ge Fei	(Indonesia) Trikus Heryanto (Indonesia) Minarti Timur	(Indonesia) Imam Tohari (Indonesia) Emma Ermawati

== Men's singles ==
=== Finals ===
Semi-finals
(Indonesia) Joko Suprianto	15	15
(Indonesia) Indra Wijaya	13	10
(China) Sun Jun	15	15
(Malaysia) Ong Ewe Hock	11	1

Final
(Indonesia) Joko Suprianto	9	8
(China) Sun Jun	15	15

== Women's singles ==
=== Finals ===
Semi-finals
(China) Ye Zhaoying	11	5	11
(Indonesia) Mia Audina	4	11	5
(China) Gong Zhichao	10	9
(Indonesia) Susi Susanti	13	11

Final
(China) Ye Zhaoying	8	5
(Indonesia) Susi Susanti	11	11

== Men's doubles ==
=== Finals ===
Semi-finals
(Indonesia) Rexy Mainaky (Indonesia) Ricky Subagja	15	15
(Malaysia) Choong Tan Fook (Malaysia) Lee Wan Wah	2	3
(South Korea) Lee Dong-soo (South Korea) Yoo Yong-sung	8	15	15
(Indonesia) Sigit Budiarto (Indonesia) Candra Wijaya	15	8	12

Final
(Indonesia) Rexy Mainaky (Indonesia) Ricky Subagja	15	10	15
(South Korea) Lee Dong-soo (South Korea) Yoo Yong-sung	1	15	3

== Women's doubles ==
=== Finals ===
Semi-finals
(China) Ge Fei (China) Gu Jun	15	15
(Indonesia) Eliza Nathanael (Indonesia) Zelin Resiana	9	5
(China) Qin Yiyuan (China) Tang Yongshu	15	15
(Indonesia) Finarsih (Indonesia) Indarti Issolina	4	9

Final
(China) Ge Fei (China) Gu Jun	15	9	15
(China) Qin Yiyuan (China) Tang Yongshu	10	15	9

== Mixed doubles ==
=== Finals ===
Semi-finals
(China) Liu Yong (China) Ge Fei	12	15	15
(Indonesia) Flandy Limpele (Indonesia) Rosalina Riseu	15	7	2
(Indonesia) Trikus Heryanto (Indonesia) Minarti Timur	15	15
(Indonesia) Imam Tohari (Indonesia) Emma Ermawati	4	3

Final
(China) Liu Yong (China) Ge Fei	12	15	15
(Indonesia) Trikus Heryanto (Indonesia) Minarti Timur	15	7	10
