= 2000 Asian Badminton Championships =

Badminton championships

Tournament information
- Location: Istora Senayan, Jakarta, Indonesia
- Dates: November 1–November 5

The 2000 Badminton Asia Championships was the 19th tournament of the Badminton Asia Championships. It was held in Jakarta, Indonesia.

== Medalists ==
Event	Gold	Silver	Bronze
Men's singles	(Indonesia) Taufik Hidayat	(Indonesia) Rony Agustinus	(Indonesia) Marleve Mainaky
Men's singles	(Indonesia) Taufik Hidayat	(Indonesia) Rony Agustinus	(India) Pullela Gopichand
Women's singles	(China) Xie Xingfang	(Indonesia) Ellen Angelina	(Japan) Fumi Iwawaki
Women's singles	(China) Xie Xingfang	(Indonesia) Ellen Angelina	(South Korea) Lee Kyung-won
Men's doubles	(Indonesia) Rexy Mainaky (Indonesia) Tony Gunawan	(Malaysia) Choong Tan Fook (Malaysia) Lee Wan Wah	(Indonesia) Candra Wijaya (Indonesia) Antonius Budi Ariantho
Men's doubles	(Indonesia) Rexy Mainaky (Indonesia) Tony Gunawan	(Malaysia) Choong Tan Fook (Malaysia) Lee Wan Wah	(Indonesia) Imam Sodikin (Indonesia) Luluk Hadiyanto
Women's doubles	(South Korea) Lee Hyo-jung (South Korea) Yim Kyung-jin	(Indonesia) Eti Tantri (Indonesia) Minarti Timur	(South Korea) Lee Kyung-won (South Korea) Chung Jae-hee
Women's doubles	(South Korea) Lee Hyo-jung (South Korea) Yim Kyung-jin	(Indonesia) Eti Tantri (Indonesia) Minarti Timur	(Indonesia) Rosie Riani (Indonesia) Diah Novita
Mixed doubles	(Indonesia) Bambang Suprianto (Indonesia) Minarti Timur	(Indonesia) Wahyu Agung (Indonesia) Emma Ermawati	(Indonesia) Santoso Sugiharjo (Indonesia) Eny Widiowati
Mixed doubles	(Indonesia) Bambang Suprianto (Indonesia) Minarti Timur	(Indonesia) Wahyu Agung (Indonesia) Emma Ermawati	(Indonesia) Tri Kusharyanto (Indonesia) Vita Marissa

== Medal table ==
Rank	Nation	Gold	Silver	Bronze	Total
1	Indonesia (INA)	3	4	6	13
2	South Korea (KOR)	1	0	2	3
3	China (CHN)	1	0	0	1
4	Malaysia (MAS)	0	1	0	1
5	India (IND)	0	0	1	1
5	Japan (JPN)	0	0	1	1
Totals (6 entries)		5	5	10	20

=== Finals ===
Category	Winners	Runners-up	Score
Men's singles	(Indonesia) Taufik Hidayat	(Indonesia) Rony Agustinus	14-17, 15-2, 15-3
Women's singles	(China) Xie Xingfang	(Indonesia) Ellen Angelina	2-11, 11-7, 11-3
Men's doubles	(Indonesia) Rexy Mainaky (Indonesia) Tony Gunawan	(Malaysia) Choong Tan Fook (Malaysia) Lee Wan Wah	15-8, 15-9
Women's doubles	(South Korea) Lee Hyo-jung (South Korea) Yim Kyung-jin	(Indonesia) Eti Tantri (Indonesia) Minarti Timur	15-8, 15-13
Mixed doubles	(Indonesia) Bambang Suprianto (Indonesia) Minarti Timur	(Indonesia) Wahyu Agung (Indonesia) Emma Ermawati	15-10, 15-12

=== Semifinals ===
Category	Winner	Runner-up	Score
Men's singles	(Indonesia) Taufik Hidayat	(India) Pullela Gopichand	15–4, 15–12
Men's singles	(Indonesia) Rony Agustinus	(Indonesia) Marleve Mainaky	15–10, 15–5
Women's singles	(Indonesia) Ellen Angelina	(South Korea) Lee Kyung-won	11–0, 11–4
Women's singles	(China) Xie Xingfang	(Japan) Fumi Iwawaki	11–0, 11–2
Men's doubles	(Malaysia) Choong Tan Fook (Malaysia) Lee Wan Wah	(Indonesia) Antonius Ariantho (Indonesia) Candra Wijaya	15–12, 15–5
Men's doubles	(Indonesia) Rexy Mainaky (Indonesia) Tony Gunawan	(Indonesia) Imam Sodikin (Indonesia) Luluk Hadiyanto	15–13, 15–1
Women's doubles	(Indonesia) Etty Tantri (Indonesia) Minarti Timur	(South Korea) Chung Jae-hee (South Korea) Lee Kyung-won	15–12, 9–15, 15–13
Women's doubles	(South Korea) Lee Hyo-jung (South Korea) Yim Kyung-jin	(Indonesia) Diah Novita (Indonesia) Rosie Riani	15–7, 9–15, 15–13
Mixed doubles	(Indonesia) Wahyu Agung (Indonesia) Emma Ermawati	(Indonesia) Tri Kusharjanto (Indonesia) Vita Marissa	17–14, 15–3
Mixed doubles	(Indonesia) Bambang Suprianto (Indonesia) Minarti Timur	(Indonesia) Santoso Sugiharjo (Indonesia) Eny Widiowati	15–11, 15–12
