= 2000 World Badminton Grand Prix Finals =

Tournament details
- Dates: 8–12 August 2001
- Edition: 18
- Total prize money: US$250,000
- Location: Bandar Seri Begawan, Brunei

The 2000 World Badminton Grand Prix Finals was the 18th edition of the World Badminton Grand Prix Finals. The tournament had originally been planned to take place in 2000, but was rescheduled for 2001. Finally, it was held in Bandar Seri Begawan, Brunei, from August 8 to August 12, 2001. The prize money was USD250,000.

== Final results ==
Category	Winners	Runners-up	Score
Men's singles	(China) Xia Xuanze	(Indonesia) Marleve Mainaky	7–4, 7–5, 2–7, 8–6
Women's singles	(China) Zhou Mi	(China) Gong Zhichao	7–5, 5–7, 7–1, 7–0
Men's doubles	(Indonesia) Candra Wijaya & Tony Gunawan	(Indonesia) Halim Heryanto & Sigit Budiarto	7–5, 8–6, 7–2
Women's doubles	(China) Huang Nanyan & Yang Wei	(China) Jiang Xuelian & Chen Lin	8–6, 7–3, 3–7, 7–3
Mixed doubles	(Denmark) Jens Eriksen & Mette Schjoldager	(Indonesia) Tri Kusharyanto & Minarti Timur	8–7, 7–4, 7–4
