= 2001 Asian Badminton Championships =

Badminton championships

Tournament details
- Country: Philippines
- City: Manila
- Venue: PhilSports Arena
- Dates: August 21–26, 2001

The 2001 Asian Badminton Championships was the 20th edition of the Asian Badminton Championships. It was held in PhilSports Arena, Manila, Philippines from August 21 to August 26, 2001.

== Medalists ==
Event	Gold	Silver	Bronze
Men's singles	(China) Xia Xuanze	(China) Lin Dan	(Singapore) Indra Wijaya
Men's singles	(China) Xia Xuanze	(China) Lin Dan	(South Korea) Shon Seung-mo
Women's singles	(China) Zhang Ning	(Hong Kong) Wang Chen	(China) Dong Fang
Women's singles	(China) Zhang Ning	(Hong Kong) Wang Chen	(Hong Kong) Ling Wan Ting
Men's doubles	(Indonesia) Bambang Suprianto; Trikus Haryanto	(Indonesia) Tony Gunawan; Candra Wijaya	(China) Cheng Rui; Wang Wei
Men's doubles	(Indonesia) Bambang Suprianto; Trikus Haryanto	(Indonesia) Tony Gunawan; Candra Wijaya	(Indonesia) Hendra Gunawan; Alvent Yulianto
Women's doubles	(China) Gao Ling; Huang Sui	(Indonesia) Deyana Lomban; Vita Marissa	(Indonesia) Eny Erlangga; Jo Novita
Women's doubles	(China) Gao Ling; Huang Sui	(Indonesia) Deyana Lomban; Vita Marissa	(China) Zhao Tingting and Zhang Yawen
Mixed doubles	(South Korea) Kim Dong-moon; Ra Kyung-min	(Indonesia) Bambang Suprianto; Minarti Timur	(Indonesia) Tony Gunawan; Vita Marissa
Mixed doubles	(South Korea) Kim Dong-moon; Ra Kyung-min	(Indonesia) Bambang Suprianto; Minarti Timur	(Indonesia) Trikus Haryanto; Emma Ermawati

== Medal table ==
Rank	Nation	Gold	Silver	Bronze	Total
1	China (CHN)	3	1	3	7
2	Indonesia (INA)	1	3	4	8
3	South Korea (KOR)	1	0	1	2
4	Hong Kong (HKG)	0	1	1	2
5	Singapore (SGP)	0	0	1	1
Totals (5 entries)		5	5	10	20

=== Finals ===
Category	Winners	Runners-up	Score
Men's singles	(China) Xia Xuanze	(China) Lin Dan	15–10, 15–9
Women's singles	(China) Zhang Ning	(Hong Kong) Wang Chen	11–1, 11–3
Men's doubles	(Indonesia) Bambang Suprianto (Indonesia) Trikus Haryanto	(Indonesia) Tony Gunawan (Indonesia) Candra Wijaya	8–15, 15–13, 15–13
Women's doubles	(China) Gao Ling (China) Huang Sui	(Indonesia) Deyana Lomban (Indonesia) Vita Marissa	12–15, 15–4, 15–6
Mixed doubles	(South Korea) Kim Dong-moon (South Korea) Ra Kyung-min	(Indonesia) Bambang Suprianto (Indonesia) Minarti Timur	11–15, 15–4, 15–3

=== Semifinals ===
Category	Winner	Runner-up	Score
Men's singles	(China) Lin Dan	(South Korea) Shon Seung-mo	3–15, 15–11, 15–7
Men's singles	(China) Xia Xuanze	(Singapore) Indra Wijaya	15–7, 15–8
Women's singles	(Hong Kong) Wang Chen	(China) Dong Fang	5–11, 11–1, 11–4
Women's singles	(China) Zhang Ning	(Hong Kong) Ling Wan Ting	11–3, 11–2
Men's doubles	(Indonesia) Candra Wijaya (Indonesia) Tony Gunawan	(China) Cheng Rui (China) Wang Wei	15–4, 17–14
Men's doubles	(Indonesia) Bambang Suprianto (Indonesia) Tri Kusharjanto	(Indonesia) Alvent Yulianto (Indonesia) Hendra Aprida Gunawan	15–4, 15–9
Women's doubles	(China) Gao Ling (China) Huang Sui	(Indonesia) Eny Erlangga (Indonesia) Jo Novita	15–5, 15–3
Women's doubles	(Indonesia) Deyana Lomban (Indonesia) Vita Marissa	(China) Zhang Yawen (China) Zhao Tingting	15–12, 11–15, 15–12
Mixed doubles	(South Korea) Kim Dong-moon (South Korea) Ra Kyung-min	(Indonesia) Tony Gunawan (Indonesia) Vita Marissa	12–15, 15–13, 15–9
Mixed doubles	(Indonesia) Bambang Suprianto (Indonesia) Minarti Timur	(Indonesia) Tri Kusharjanto (Indonesia) Emma Ermawati	15–4, 15–11
