= 1999 World Badminton Grand Prix Finals =

Tournament details
- Dates: 1–5 December 1999
- Edition: 17
- Total prize money: US$300,000
- Location: Bandar Seri Begawan, Brunei

The 1999 World Badminton Grand Prix Finals was the 17th edition of the World Badminton Grand Prix Finals. It was held in Bandar Seri Begawan, Brunei from December 1 to December 5, 1999. The prize money was USD300,000.

== Final results ==
Category	Winners	Runners-up	Score
Men's singles	(Denmark) Peter Gade	(Indonesia) Marleve Mainaky	15–11, 15–3
Women's singles	(China) Ye Zhaoying	(China) Dai Yun	11–4, 6–11, 11–9
Men's doubles	(Indonesia) Candra Wijaya & Tony Gunawan	(South Korea) Ha Tae-kwon & Kim Dong-moon	15–7, 8–15, 15–11
Women's doubles	(China) Ge Fei & Gu Jun	(South Korea) Chung Jae-hee & Ra Kyung-min	15–2, 15–4
Mixed doubles	(South Korea) Kim Dong-moon & Ra Kyung-min	(Indonesia) Tri Kusharyanto & Minarti Timur	15–7, 15–7
