= 1997 World Badminton Grand Prix Finals =

Tournament details
- Dates: 10–14 December
- Edition: 15
- Total prize money: US$380,000
- Venue: Istora Senayan
- Location: Jakarta, Indonesia

The 1997 World Badminton Grand Prix was the 15th edition of the World Badminton Grand Prix finals. It was held in Istora Senayan, Jakarta, Indonesia, from December 10 to December 14, 1997. The prize money was USD380,000.

== Final results ==
Category	Winners	Runners-up	Score
Men's singles	(China) Sun Jun	(China) Dong Jiong	15–9, 15–6
Women's singles	(China) Ye Zhaoying	(Indonesia) Susi Susanti	11–4, 11–4
Men's doubles	(Indonesia) Candra Wijaya & Sigit Budiarto	(Malaysia) Cheah Soon Kit & Yap Kim Hock	17–15, 11–15, 15–5
Women's doubles	(China) Ge Fei & Gu Jun	(China) Qin Yiyuan & Tang Yongshu	15–1, 15–8
Mixed doubles	(China) Liu Yong & Ge Fei	(Indonesia) Trikus Heryanto & Minarti Timur	15–9, 15–13

== Men's singles ==
=== Group A ===
Player	W	L
(Denmark) Peter Gade	3	0
(China) Luo Yigang	2	1
(Indonesia) Budi Santoso	1	2
(Indonesia) Alan Budikusuma	0	3

Peter Gade (Denmark)	17–16, 15–7	(China) Luo Yigang
Peter Gade (Denmark)	15–12, 18–17	(Indonesia) Budi Santoso
Peter Gade (Denmark)	7–15, 15–8, 15–12	(Indonesia) Alan Budikusuma
Luo Yigang (China)	11–15, 15–12, 15–5	(Indonesia) Budi Santoso
Luo Yigang (China)	18–13, 17–14	(Indonesia) Alan Budikusuma
Budi Santoso (Indonesia)	15–9, 15–1	(Indonesia) Alan Budikusuma

=== Group B ===
Player	W	L
(China) Sun Jun	3	0
(Indonesia) Marlev Mainaky	2	1
(Indonesia) Heryanto Arbi	1	2
(Denmark) Thomas Stuer-Lauridsen	0	3

Sun Jun (China)	15–8, 15–9	(Indonesia) Marlev Mainaky
Sun Jun (China)	15–4, 13–15, 15–7	(Indonesia) Heryanto Arbi
Sun Jun (China)	15–2, 18–14	(Denmark) Thomas Stuer-Lauridsen
Marlev Mainaky (Indonesia)	15–11, 15–1	(Indonesia) Heryanto Arbi
Marlev Mainaky (Indonesia)	15–7, 15–11	(Denmark) Thomas Stuer-Lauridsen
Heryanto Arbi (Indonesia)	7–15, 15–11, 18–14	(Denmark) Thomas Stuer-Lauridsen

=== Group C ===
Player	W	L
(China) Dong Jiong	3	0
(Denmark) Peter Rasmussen	2	1
(Indonesia) Hendrawan	1	2
(Indonesia) Ardy B. Wiranata	0	3

Dong Jiong (China)	17–14, 12–15, 15–8	(Indonesia) Hendrawan
Dong Jiong (China)	15–12, 15–7	(Indonesia) Ardy B. Wiranata
Dong Jiong (China)	15–4, 15–6	(Denmark) Peter Rasmussen
Peter Rasmussen (Denmark)	6–15, 15–4, 15–13	(Indonesia) Hendrawan
Peter Rasmussen (Denmark)	15–12, 15–7	(Indonesia) Ardy B. Wiranata
Hendrawan (Indonesia)	8–15, 15–7, 15–8	(Indonesia) Ardy B. Wiranata

=== Group D ===
Player	W	L
(Denmark) Poul-Erik Høyer Larsen	3	0
(Indonesia) Hermawan Susanto	2	1
(Indonesia) Indra Wijaya	1	2
(China) Chen Gang	0	3

Høyer Larsen (Denmark)	13–15, 15–7, 15–8	(Indonesia) Hermawan Susanto
Høyer Larsen (Denmark)	15–11, 15–1	(Indonesia) Indra Wijaya
Høyer Larsen (Denmark)	15–7, 15–10	(China) Chen Gang
Hermawan Susanto (Indonesia)	15–9, 17–14	(Indonesia) Indra Wijaya
Hermawan Susanto (Indonesia)	15–11, 9–15, 15–8	(China) Chen Gang
Indra Wijaya (Indonesia)	15–3, 15–9	(China) Chen Gang

=== Knockout stage ===
Semifinals
(Denmark) Peter Gade	10	17	6
(China) Sun Jun	15	15	15
(China) Dong Jiong	15	15
(Denmark) Høyer Larsen	9	7

Final
(China) Sun Jun	15	15
(China) Dong Jiong	9	6

== Women's singles ==
Semifinals
(Indonesia) Susi Susanti	11	11
(China) Gong Zhichao	8	4
(China) Ye Zhaoying	11	11
(China) Wang Chen	6	4

Final
(Indonesia) Susi Susanti	4	4
(China) Ye Zhaoying	11	11

== Men's doubles ==
Semifinals
(Malaysia) Cheah Soon Kit (Malaysia) Yap Kim Hock	15	15
(Denmark) Jens Eriksen (Denmark) Jesper Larsen	2	9
(Indonesia) Candra Wijaya (Indonesia) Sigit Budiarto	5	15	15
(Indonesia) Ricky Subagja (Indonesia) Rexy Mainaky	15	8	3

Final
(Malaysia) Cheah Soon Kit (Malaysia) Yap Kim Hock	15	15	5
(Indonesia) Candra Wijaya (Indonesia) Sigit Budiarto	17	11	15

== Women's doubles ==
Semifinals
(China) Ge Fei (China) Gu Jun	15	15
(Indonesia) Eliza Nathanael (Indonesia) Rosiana Zelin	6	10
(China) Qiang Hong (China) Liu Lu	9	10
(China) Qin Yiyuan (China) Tang Yongshu	15	15

Final
(China) Ge Fei (China) Gu Jun	15	15
(China) Qin Yiyuan (China) Tang Yongshu	1	8

== Mixed doubles ==
Semifinals
(Indonesia) Trikus Heryanto (Indonesia) Minarti Timur	15	15
(Denmark) Jens Eriksen (Denmark) Marlene Thomsen	9	2
(China) Liu Yong (China) Ge Fei	15	15
(Indonesia) Bambang Suprianto (Indonesia) Rosalina Riseu	2	3

Final
(Indonesia) Trikus Heryanto (Indonesia) Minarti Timur	9	13
(China) Liu Yong (China) Ge Fei	15	15
