= Ellen Angelina =

Indonesian badminton player and coach

Personal information
- Born: Ellen Angelinawaty; 30 June 1976 (age 50) Salatiga, Central Java, Indonesia
- Height: 1.65 m (5 ft 5 in)
- Weight: 63 kg (139 lb)

Sport
- Country: Indonesia
- Sport: Badminton
- Handedness: Right
- Event: Women's singles

Women's singles
- BWF profile
Medal record
Women's badminton
Representing Indonesia
Sudirman Cup
Bronze medal – third place	1999 Copenhagen	Mixed team
Uber Cup
Silver medal – second place	1998 Hong Kong	Women's team
Bronze medal – third place	2000 Kuala Lumpur	Women's team
Asian Championships
Silver medal – second place	2000 Jakarta	Women's singles
SEA Games
Gold medal – first place	1999 Bandar Seri Begawan	Women's team

Ellen Angelinawaty (born 30 June 1976) is an Indonesian badminton player and now is a badminton coach in PB Djarum. Born in Salatiga, Central Java, Angelina who play in the singles category, had won the Malaysia and Indonesia International tournaments in 1997. She reach the final at the 2000 Asian Championships, and clinched the silver medal after lose to Xie Xingfang of China. At the same year, she competed at the Summer Olympics in Sydney, Australia. At the peak of her career, she won the 2001 Indonesia Open, beating the Chinese player Wang Chen in the final.

== Achievements ==
=== Asian Championships ===
Women's singles
Year	Venue	Opponent	Score	Result
2000	Istora Senayan; Jakarta, Indonesia	(China) Xie Xingfang	11–2, 7–11, 3–11	Silver

=== IBF World Grand Prix ===
The World Badminton Grand Prix has been sanctioned by the International Badminton Federation from 1983 to 2006.

Women's singles
Year	Tournament	Opponent	Score	Result
1996	Brunei Open	(China) Wu Huimin	3–11, 5–11	(silver) Runner-up
1999	Indonesia Open	(Indonesia) Lidya Djaelawijaya	8–11, 11–9, 2–11	(silver) Runner-up
2001	Indonesia Open	(China) Wang Chen	7–5, 7–3, 5–7, 7–4	(gold) Winner

IBF Grand Prix tournament
IBF Grand Prix Finals tournament

=== IBF International ===
Women's singles
Year	Tournament	Opponent	Score	Result
1997	Malaysia International	(Singapore) Zarinah Abdullah	11–9, 11–7	(gold) Winner
1997	Indonesia International	(Indonesia) Olivia	11–9, 11–0	(gold) Winner

=== IBF Junior International ===
Girls' singles
Year	Tournament	Opponent	Score	Result	Ref.
1994	German Junior	(Indonesia) Carmelita		(gold) Winner	
