= Candra Wijaya =

Indonesian badminton player (born 1975)

Personal information
- Born: Tan Chia Liang; 16 September 1975 (age 51) Cirebon, West Java, Indonesia
- Height: 1.75 m (5 ft 9 in)
- Weight: 67 kg (148 lb)

Sport
- Country: Indonesia
- Sport: Badminton
- Handedness: Right
- Coached by: Christian Hadinata; Herry Iman Pierngadi

Men's doubles
- Highest ranking: 1
- BWF profile
Medal record
Men's badminton
Representing Indonesia
Olympic Games
Gold medal – first place	2000 Sydney	Men's doubles
World Championships
Gold medal – first place	1997 Glasgow	Men's doubles
Silver medal – second place	2003 Birmingham	Men's doubles
Silver medal – second place	2005 Anaheim	Men's doubles
World Cup
Silver medal – second place	2005 Yiyang	Men's doubles
Bronze medal – third place	1997 Yogyakarta	Men's doubles
Sudirman Cup
Silver medal – second place	2001 Seville	Mixed team
Silver medal – second place	2005 Beijing	Mixed team
Silver medal – second place	2007 Glasgow	Mixed team
Bronze medal – third place	1997 Glasgow	Mixed team
Bronze medal – third place	1999 Copenhagen	Mixed team
Bronze medal – third place	2003 Eindhoven	Mixed team
Thomas Cup
Gold medal – first place	1998 Hong Kong	Men's team
Gold medal – first place	2000 Kuala Lumpur	Men's team
Gold medal – first place	2002 Guangzhou	Men's team
Bronze medal – third place	2004 Jakarta	Men's team
Bronze medal – third place	2006 Sendai & Tokyo	Men's team
Bronze medal – third place	2008 Jakarta	Men's team
Asian Games
Gold medal – first place	1998 Bangkok	Men's team
Silver medal – second place	2002 Busan	Men's team
Asian Championships
Gold medal – first place	1996 Surabaya	Men's doubles
Silver medal – second place	2001 Manila	Men's doubles
Silver medal – second place	2002 Bangkok	Men's doubles
Silver medal – second place	2004 Kuala Lumpur	Men's doubles
Silver medal – second place	2008 Johor Bahru	Men's doubles
Bronze medal – third place	1995 Beijing	Men's doubles
Bronze medal – third place	2000 Jakarta	Men's doubles
Asian Cup
Bronze medal – third place	1995 Qingdao	Men's doubles
Bronze medal – third place	1996 Seoul	Men's doubles
Asia Cup
Gold medal – first place	1997 Jakarta	Men's team
Gold medal – first place	1999 Ho Chi Minh	Men's team
Bronze medal – third place	2001 Singapore	Men's team
SEA Games
Gold medal – first place	1997 Jakarta	Men's doubles
Gold medal – first place	1997 Jakarta	Mixed doubles
Gold medal – first place	1997 Jakarta	Men's team
Gold medal – first place	2001 Kuala Lumpur	Men's doubles
Silver medal – second place	2001 Kuala Lumpur	Men's team
World Junior Championships
Bronze medal – third place	1992 Jakarta	Mixed doubles

Rafael Candra Wijaya (Chinese: 陳甲亮; Pe̍h-ōe-jī: Tan Ke Liông; born Tan Chia Liang, 16 September 1975) is an Indonesian badminton player.

== Career ==
Wijaya started his career in badminton at the age of five, motivated by his brother Indra Wijaya and later joined a club in Cirebon. His father, Hendra Wijaya, then took him to a club Pelita Jakarta when he was fourteen. In 1991, he was selected to join the national team. In 1998, he moved to Jaya Raya Jakarta.

Wijaya is a doubles specialist. He has been rated among the best men's doubles players in the world for over a decade. Noted for his ability in all phases of the doubles game, he has reached the final of the BWF World Championships three times with countryman Sigit Budiarto. They won the 1997 edition in Glasgow, Scotland and finished second in 2003 and 2005. With Tony Gunawan he captured the men's doubles gold medal at the 2000 Olympics in Sydney. Though Budiarto has been his most frequent partner, Wijaya has won top tier men's doubles events (and a mixed doubles event or two) with a variety of players, recently renewing an earlier partnership with Gunawan. Wijaya was a member of the world champion Indonesia Thomas Cup (men's international) teams of 1998, 2000, and 2002. He was named IBF Player of the Year and received the Eddy Choong awards in 2000.

In 2007 he joined the Japanese club owned by Tonami.

== Personal life ==
Wijaya was born in a badminton family. His father Hendra Wijaya introduced him to badminton at the young age. His siblings, Indra Wijaya, Rendra Wijaya and Sandrawati Wijaya also a former national badminton players. He married Maria Caroline Indriani on 20 January 2001 at St. Thomas Rasul Church in Cengkareng. They have two children.

He was a founder of Candra Wijaya International Badminton Centre, and Candra Wijaya badminton club.

== Participation at Indonesian Team ==
- 6 times at Sudirman Cup (1997, 1999, 2001, 2003, 2005, 2007)
- 6 times at Thomas Cup (1998, 2000, 2002, 2004, 2006, 2008)

== Awards and nominations ==
Award	Year	Category	Result	Ref.
International Badminton Federation Awards	2000	Eddy Choong Player of the Year	Won	

== Achievements ==
=== Olympic Games ===
Men's doubles
Year	Venue	Partner	Opponent	Score	Result	Ref.
2000	The Dome, Sydney, Australia	(Indonesia) Tony Gunawan	(South Korea) Lee Dong-soo (South Korea) Yoo Yong-sung	15–10, 9–15, 15–7	Gold	

=== World Championships ===
Men's doubles
Year	Venue	Partner	Opponent	Score	Result	Ref.
1997	Scotstoun Centre, Glasgow, Scotland	(Indonesia) Sigit Budiarto	(Malaysia) Cheah Soon Kit (Malaysia) Yap Kim Hock	8–15, 18–17, 15–7	Gold	
2003	National Indoor Arena, Birmingham, United Kingdom	(Indonesia) Sigit Budiarto	(Denmark) Lars Paaske (Denmark) Jonas Rasmussen	7–15, 15–13, 13–15	Silver	
2005	Arrowhead Pond, Anaheim, United States	(Indonesia) Sigit Budiarto	(United States) Howard Bach (United States) Tony Gunawan	11–15, 15–10, 11–15	Silver	

=== World Cup ===
Men's doubles
Year	Venue	Partner	Opponent	Score	Result	Ref.
1997	Among Rogo Sports Hall, Yogyakarta, Indonesia	(Indonesia) Sigit Budiarto	(South Korea) Lee Dong-soo (South Korea) Yoo Yong-sung	15–8, 8–15, 12–15	Bronze	
2005	Olympic Park, Yiyang, China	(Indonesia) Sigit Budiarto	(China) Cai Yun (China) Fu Haifeng	11–21, 18–21	Silver	

=== Asian Championships ===
Men's doubles
Year	Venue	Partner	Opponent	Score	Result
1995	Olympic Sports Center Gymnasium, Beijing, China	(Indonesia) Ade Sutrisna	(Malaysia) Cheah Soon Kit (Malaysia) Yap Kim Hock	6–15, 8–15	Bronze
1996	Pancasila Hall, Surabaya, Indonesia	(Indonesia) Ade Sutrisna	(South Korea) Ha Tae-kwon (South Korea) Kang Kyung-jin	15–8, 15–17, 15–11	Gold
2000	Istora Senayan, Jakarta, Indonesia	(Indonesia) Antonius Ariantho	(Malaysia) Choong Tan Fook (Malaysia) Lee Wan Wah	12–15, 5–15	Bronze
2001	PhilSports Arena, Manila, Philippines	(Indonesia) Tony Gunawan	(Indonesia) Tri Kusharjanto (Indonesia) Bambang Suprianto	15–8, 13–15, 13–15	Silver
2002	Nimibutr Stadium, Bangkok, Thailand	(Indonesia) Sigit Budiarto	(South Korea) Ha Tae-kwon (South Korea) Kim Dong-moon	6–15, 8–15	Silver
2004	Kuala Lumpur Badminton Stadium; Kuala Lumpur, Malaysia	(Indonesia) Halim Haryanto	(Indonesia) Tri Kusharjanto (Indonesia) Sigit Budiarto	13–15, 5–15	Silver
2008	Bandaraya Stadium, Johor Bahru, Malaysia	(Indonesia) Nova Widianto	(South Korea) Jung Jae-sung (South Korea) Lee Yong-dae	16–21, 16–21	Silver

=== Asian Cup ===
Men's doubles
Year	Venue	Partner	Opponent	Score	Result
1995	Xinxing Gymnasium, Qingdao, China	(Indonesia) Ade Sutrisna	(China) Huang Zhanzhong (China) Jiang Xin		Bronze
1996	Olympic Gymnasium No. 2 Seoul, South Korea	(Indonesia) Ade Sutrisna	(South Korea) Kim Dong-moon (South Korea) Yoo Yong-sung	11–15, 6–15	Bronze

=== SEA Games ===
Men's doubles
Year	Venue	Partner	Opponent	Score	Result
1997	Asia-Africa hall, Gelora Bung Karno Sports Complex; Jakarta, Indonesia	(Indonesia) Sigit Budiarto	(Indonesia) Rexy Mainaky (Indonesia) Ricky Subagja	15–4, 14–17, 15–11	Gold
2001	Malawati Stadium; Selangor, Malaysia	(Indonesia) Sigit Budiarto	(Indonesia) Tony Gunawan (Indonesia) Bambang Suprianto	15–4, 15–6	Gold

Mixed doubles
Year	Venue	Partner	Opponent	Score	Result
1997	Asia-Africa hall, Gelora Bung Karno Sports Complex; Jakarta, Indonesia	(Indonesia) Eliza Nathanael	(Indonesia) Tri Kusharjanto (Indonesia) Minarti Timur	12–15, 15–7, 15–2	Gold

=== World Junior Championships ===
The Bimantara World Junior Championships was an international invitation badminton tournament for junior players. It was held in Jakarta, Indonesia from 1987 to 1991. In 1992, International Badminton Federation (former name of Badminton World Federation) started the first IBF World Junior Championships in Jakarta, Indonesia.

Boys' doubles
Year	Venue	Partner	Opponent	Score	Result
1991	Jakarta, Indonesia	(Indonesia) Bambang Suyono	(Indonesia) Dadan Hidayat (Indonesia) Kurnia	7–15, 7–15	Silver

Mixed doubles
Year	Venue	Partner	Opponent	Score	Result
1992	Istora Senayan, Jakarta, Indonesia	(Indonesia) Susi Chusnul	(Denmark) Jim Laugesen (Denmark) Rikke Olsen	13–15, 15–17	Bronze

=== BWF Superseries (1 title, 3 runners-up) ===
The BWF Superseries, which was launched on 14 December 2006 and implemented in 2007, is a series of elite badminton tournaments, sanctioned by the Badminton World Federation (BWF). BWF Superseries levels are Superseries and Superseries Premier. A season of Superseries consists of twelve tournaments around the world that have been introduced since 2011. Successful players are invited to the Superseries Finals, which are held at the end of each year.

Men's doubles
Year	Tournament	Partner	Opponent	Score	Result
2007	Malaysia Open	(United States) Tony Gunawan	(Malaysia) Koo Kien Keat (Malaysia) Tan Boon Heong	15–21, 18–21	(silver) Runner-up
2007	Japan Open	(United States) Tony Gunawan	(Indonesia) Luluk Hadiyanto (Indonesia) Alvent Yulianto	21–18, 21–17	(gold) Winner
2007	Hong Kong Open	(United States) Tony Gunawan	(Indonesia) Markis Kido (Indonesia) Hendra Setiawan	12–21, 21–18, 13–21	(silver) Runner-up
2008	Indonesia Open	(United States) Tony Gunawan	(Malaysia) Mohd Zakry Abdul Latif (Malaysia) Mohd Fairuzizuan Mohd Tazari	21–19, 18–21, 14–21	(silver) Runner-up

BWF Super Series Finals tournament
BWF Super Series Premier tournament
BWF Super Series tournament

=== IBF/BWF Grand Prix (33 titles, 14 runners-up) ===
The BWF Grand Prix had two levels, the BWF Grand Prix and Grand Prix Gold. It was a series of badminton tournaments sanctioned by the Badminton World Federation (BWF) which was held from 2007 to 2017. The World Badminton Grand Prix sanctioned by International Badminton Federation (IBF) from 1983 to 2006.

Men's doubles
Year	Tournament	Partner	Opponent	Score	Result
1994	Canadian Open	(Indonesia) Ade Sutrisna	(Malaysia) Yap Yee Guan (Malaysia) Yap Yee Hup	15–10, 15–12	(gold) Winner
1994	U.S. Open	(Indonesia) Ade Sutrisna	(Malaysia) Yap Yee Guan (Malaysia) Yap Yee Hup	15–8, 15–14	(gold) Winner
1995	German Open	(Indonesia) Ade Sutrisna	(Denmark) Jon Holst-Christensen (Denmark) Thomas Lund	8–15, 13–15	(silver) Runner-up
1996	Swedish Open	(Indonesia) Ade Sutrisna	(Indonesia) Sigit Budiarto (Indonesia) Dicky Purwotjugiono	15–12, 15–6	(gold) Winner
1996	U.S. Open	(Indonesia) Sigit Budiarto	(Malaysia) Cheah Soon Kit (Malaysia) Yap Kim Hock	18–16, 15–10	(gold) Winner
1996	China Open	(Indonesia) Sigit Budiarto	(Indonesia) Rexy Mainaky (Indonesia) Ricky Subagja	15–12, 15–5	(gold) Winner
1996	Thailand Open	(Indonesia) Sigit Budiarto	(South Korea) Ha Tae-kwon (South Korea) Kang Kyung-jin	15–11, 10–15, 15–12	(gold) Winner
1997	Chinese Taipei Open	(Indonesia) Sigit Budiarto	(Indonesia) Antonius Ariantho (Indonesia) Denny Kantono	15–11, 15–2	(gold) Winner
1997	Swiss Open	(Indonesia) Sigit Budiarto	(South Korea) Lee Dong-soo (South Korea) Yoo Yong-sung	15–5, 11–15, 4–15	(silver) Runner-up
1997	Indonesia Open	(Indonesia) Sigit Budiarto	(South Korea) Lee Dong-soo (South Korea) Yoo Yong-sung	15–9, 15–10	(gold) Winner
1997	Singapore Open	(Indonesia) Sigit Budiarto	(South Korea) Lee Dong-soo (South Korea) Yoo Yong-sung	15–8, 15–10	(gold) Winner
1997	Thailand Open	(Indonesia) Sigit Budiarto	(South Korea) Lee Dong-soo (South Korea) Yoo Yong-sung	9–15, 14–17	(silver) Runner-up
1997	World Grand Prix Finals	(Indonesia) Sigit Budiarto	(Malaysia) Cheah Soon Kit (Malaysia) Yap Kim Hock	17–15, 11–15, 15–5	(gold) Winner
1998	Swedish Open	(Indonesia) Tony Gunawan	(China) Yang Ming (China) Zhang Jun	15–3, 15–6	(gold) Winner
1998	All England Open	(Indonesia) Tony Gunawan	(South Korea) Lee Dong-soo (South Korea) Yoo Yong-sung	10–15, 10–15	(silver) Runner-up
1998	Singapore Open	(Indonesia) Sigit Budiarto	(Indonesia) Rexy Mainaky (Indonesia) Ricky Subagja	15–5, 15–5	(gold) Winner
1998	Hong Kong Open	(Indonesia) Tony Gunawan	(Denmark) Jens Eriksen (Denmark) Jesper Larsen	15–10, 15–9	(gold) Winner
1999	All England Open	(Indonesia) Tony Gunawan	(South Korea) Lee Dong-soo (South Korea) Yoo Yong-sung	15–7, 15–5	(gold) Winner
1999	Malaysia Open	(Indonesia) Tony Gunawan	(Indonesia) Eng Hian (Indonesia) Flandy Limpele	15–6, 15–11	(gold) Winner
1999	Singapore Open	(Indonesia) Tony Gunawan	(Malaysia) Choong Tan Fook (Malaysia) Lee Wan Wah	7–15, 15–14, 12–15	(silver) Runner-up
1999	Indonesia Open	(Indonesia) Tony Gunawan	(Indonesia) Rexy Mainaky (Indonesia) Ricky Subagja	12–15, 8–15	(silver) Runner-up
1999	World Grand Prix Finals	(Indonesia) Tony Gunawan	(South Korea) Ha Tae-kwon (South Korea) Kim Dong-moon	15–7, 8–15, 15–11	(gold) Winner
2000	Chinese Taipei Open	(Indonesia) Tony Gunawan	(Malaysia) Cheah Soon Kit (Malaysia) Yap Kim Hock	15–7, 15–7	(gold) Winner
2000	Japan Open	(Indonesia) Tony Gunawan	(South Korea) Lee Dong-soo (South Korea) Yoo Yong-sung	15–6, 15–7	(gold) Winner
2000	Indonesia Open	(Indonesia) Tony Gunawan	(Indonesia) Eng Hian (Indonesia) Flandy Limpele	14–17, 15–8, 15–8	(gold) Winner
2000	World Grand Prix Finals	(Indonesia) Tony Gunawan	(Indonesia) Sigit Budiarto (Indonesia) Halim Haryanto	7–5, 8–6, 7–2	(gold) Winner
2001	All England Open	(Indonesia) Sigit Budiarto	(Indonesia) Tony Gunawan (Indonesia) Halim Haryanto	13–15, 15–7, 7–15	(silver) Runner-up
2001	Japan Open	(Indonesia) Sigit Budiarto	(Denmark) Martin Lundgaard Hansen (Denmark) Lars Paaske	15–7, 15–11	(gold) Winner
2001	Malaysia Open	(Indonesia) Sigit Budiarto	(Indonesia) Tony Gunawan (Indonesia) Halim Haryanto	7–4, 4–7, 7–2, 2–7, 7–5	(gold) Winner
2001	Indonesia Open	(Indonesia) Sigit Budiarto	(Indonesia) Tony Gunawan (Indonesia) Halim Haryanto	7–2, 7–3, 7–5	(gold) Winner
2001	Singapore Open	(Indonesia) Sigit Budiarto	(Indonesia) Tony Gunawan (Indonesia) Halim Haryanto	7–5, 3–7, 2–7, 0–7	(silver) Runner-up
2002	Chinese Taipei Open	(Indonesia) Bambang Suprianto	(South Korea) Ha Tae-kwon (South Korea) Kim Dong-moon	15–9, 13–15, 3–15	(silver) Runner-up
2003	All England Open	(Indonesia) Sigit Budiarto	(South Korea) Lee Dong-soo (South Korea) Yoo Yong-sung	15–5, 15–7	(gold) Winner
2003	Denmark Open	(Indonesia) Halim Haryanto	(South Korea) Ha Tae-kwon (South Korea) Kim Dong-moon	17–16, 6–15, 8–15	(silver) Runner-up
2004	China Open	(Indonesia) Sigit Budiarto	(Malaysia) Chew Choon Eng (Malaysia) Choong Tan Fook	Walkover	(gold) Winner
2005	Korea Open	(Indonesia) Sigit Budiarto	(Denmark) Jens Eriksen (Denmark) Martin Lundgaard Hansen	15–7, 13–15, 13–15	(silver) Runner-up
2005	Swiss Open	(Indonesia) Sigit Budiarto	(Indonesia) Eng Hian (Indonesia) Flandy Limpele	8–15, 15–11, 15–11	(gold) Winner
2005	Japan Open	(Indonesia) Sigit Budiarto	(Denmark) Jens Eriksen (Denmark) Martin Lundgaard Hansen	10–15, 3–15	(silver) Runner-up
2005	Singapore Open	(Indonesia) Sigit Budiarto	(Denmark) Mathias Boe (Denmark) Carsten Mogensen	8–15, 15–8, 15–7	(gold) Winner
2005	Malaysia Open	(Indonesia) Sigit Budiarto	(China) Cai Yun (China) Fu Haifeng	15–11, 17–14	(gold) Winner
2005	Indonesia Open	(Indonesia) Sigit Budiarto	(Indonesia) Markis Kido (Indonesia) Hendra Setiawan	10–15, 15–12, 3–15	(silver) Runner-up
2005	China Open	(Indonesia) Sigit Budiarto	(Denmark) Jens Eriksen (Denmark) Martin Lundgaard Hansen	17–16, 11–15, 15–13	(gold) Winner
2006	Korea Open	(United States) Tony Gunawan	(South Korea) Hwang Ji-man (South Korea) Lee Jae-jin	21–18, 21–18	(gold) Winner
2006	Indonesia Open	(United States) Tony Gunawan	(Indonesia) Markis Kido (Indonesia) Hendra Setiawan	21–11, 21–16	(gold) Winner
2006	Japan Open	(United States) Tony Gunawan	(Malaysia) Koo Kien Keat (Malaysia) Tan Boon Heong	21–15, 21–14	(gold) Winner
2008	Chinese Taipei Open	(United States) Tony Gunawan	(Denmark) Mathias Boe (Denmark) Carsten Mogensen	14–21, 20–22	(silver) Runner-up

Mixed doubles
Year	Tournament	Partner	Opponent	Score	Result
2001	Thailand Open	(Indonesia) Jo Novita	(Indonesia) Ronne Maykel Runtolalu (Indonesia) Eny Widiowati	8–6, 7–1, 8–7	(gold) Winner

BWF Grand Prix Gold tournament
BWF Grand Prix tournament

=== IBF International (1 title) ===
Men's doubles
Year	Tournament	Partner	Opponent	Score	Result
1994	Polish Open	(Indonesia) Ade Sutrisna	(Denmark) Kenneth Jonassen (Denmark) Jan Jørgensen	11–15, 15–8, 15–8	(gold) Winner

=== Invitational tournaments ===
Men's doubles
Year	Tournament	Partner	Opponent	Score	Result	Ref.
1997	Copenhagen Masters	(Indonesia) Tony Gunawan	(England) Simon Archer (England) Chris Hunt	15–13, 15–8	(gold) Winner	
1999	Ipoh Masters	(Indonesia) Tony Gunawan	(Indonesia) Flandy Limpele (Indonesia) Eng Hian	15–11, 15–9	(gold) Winner	
2003	Copenhagen Masters	(Indonesia) Halim Haryanto	(Denmark) Lars Paaske (Denmark) Jonas Rasmussen	15–11, 15–4	(gold) Winner	

== Performance timeline ==
=== National team ===
- Senior level

Team events	1997	2001
SEA Games	Gold	Silver

Team events	1998	2002
Asian Games	Gold	Silver

Team events	1998	2000	2002	2004	2006	2008
Thomas Cup	Gold	Gold	Gold	Bronze	Bronze	Bronze

=== Individual competitions ===
- Senior level

Event	1997	2001
SEA Games	Gold (MD); Gold (XD)	Gold

Event	1997	1999	2000
World Grand Prix Finals	Gold	Gold	Gold

Event	1997	1999	2001	2003	2005	2006	2007
World Championships	Gold	QF	R2	Silver	Silver	A	QF

Event	2000
Olympic Games	Gold

Tournament	2007	2008	2009	2010	2011	2012	Best
BWF Superseries
All England Open	SF	R2	R1	A			W (1999, 2003)
Swiss Open	SF	QF	R2	A	GPG		W (2005)
Malaysia Open	F	SF	QF	A	R1	A	W (1999, 2001, 2005)
Singapore Open	SF	A	A	R2	A	R1	W (1997, 1998, 2005)
Indonesia Open	SF	F	A	R1	A		W (1997, 2000, 2001, 2006)
Korea Open	SF	A			R1	A	W (2006)
Japan Open	W	QF	R1	QF	A		W (2000, 2001, 2006, 2007)
China Open	R1	SF	R1	A			W (1996, 2004, 2005)
Hong Kong Open	F	R1	R1	R2	A		W (1998)
BWF Superseries Finals	—N/a	GS	DNQ				GS (2008)

Tournament	2007	2008	2009	2010	2011	Best
BWF Grand Prix and Grand Prix Gold
Chinese Taipei Open	A	F	R1	QF	A	W (1997, 2000)
India Open	—N/a	SF	SF	A		SF (2008, 2009)
Indonesian Masters	—N/a			R1	A	R1 (2010)
Macau Open	A		R2	A		R2 (2009)
Malaysia Masters	—N/a		R2	QF	A	QF (2010)
Philippines Open	R2	—N/a	R1	—N/a		R2 (2007)
Syed Modi International	—N/a		A		R1	R1 (2011)

Tournament	1994	1995	1996	1997	1998	1999	2000	2001	2002	2003	2004	2005	2006	Best
IBF World Grand Prix
All England Open				SF	F	W	SF	F	SF	W	R1	R3	R2	W (1999, 2003)
Canadian Open	W		—N/a					—N/a						W (1994)
China Open	A	QF	W		—N/a		—N/a	SF	A	QF	W	W		W (1996, 2004, 2005)
Chinese Taipei Open		QF		W	—N/a	SF	W	—N/a	F	QF				W (1997, 2000)
Denmark Open		SF			SF					F				F (2003)
German Open		F												F (1995)
Hong Kong Open	R2		QF		W		—N/a		—N/a	R1	—N/a	R2	QF	W (1998)
Indonesia Open	w/d	SF	QF	W	SF	F	W	W	SF	SF	R3	F	W	W (1997, 2000, 2001, 2006)
Japan Open				QF	SF	SF	W	W	R2	QF	QF	F	W	W (2000, 2001, 2006)
Korea Open		R2			—N/a	QF		R3		SF	R1	F	W	W (2006)
Malaysia Open			R2			W	SF	W		R2	R1	W		W (1999, 2001, 2005)
Singapore Open			—N/a	W	W	F	—N/a	F	R2		QF	W		W (1997, 1998, 2005)
Swedish Open		SF	W		W			—N/a						W (1996, 1998)
Swiss Open		QF	SF	F							R2	W	A	W (2005)
Thailand Open	R2		W (MD)	F	—N/a			W (XD); SF (MD)	—N/a					W (1996, 2001)
U.S. Open	W		W											W (1994, 1996)
Tournament	1994	1995	1996	1997	1998	1999	2000	2001	2002	2003	2004	2005	2006	Best
