= Cynthia Tuwankotta =

Indonesian badminton player

Personal information
- Born: 28 June 1977 (age 49) Ambon, Maluku, Indonesia
- Height: 1.61 m (5 ft 3 in)
- Weight: 58 kg (128 lb)

Sport
- Country: Indonesia
- Sport: Badminton
- Handedness: Right
- Event: Women's & mixed doubles

Women's & mixed doubles
- BWF profile
Medal record
Women's badminton
Representing Indonesia
Sudirman Cup
Bronze medal – third place	1999 Copenhagen	Mixed team
Uber Cup
Bronze medal – third place	2000 Kuala Lumpur	Women's team
Asian Championships
Bronze medal – third place	1997 Kuala Lumpur	Women's doubles
Bronze medal – third place	1999 Kuala Lumpur	Women's doubles
Southeast Asian Games
Gold medal – first place	1999 Bandar Seri Begawan	Women's doubles
Gold medal – first place	1999 Bandar Seri Begawan	Women's team

Cynthia Tuwankotta (born 28 June 1977) is an Indonesian former badminton player who later represented Switzerland. Tuwankotta started playing badminton at aged six, and she won the junior title at her hometown Maluku when she was ten. She then selected to join Indonesia national team in 1994, and was part of the team for 6 years. In 2000, she moved to Switzerland and was part of the national team from 2000 to 2009. She reached a career high as world number 6 in the women's doubles world ranking. Tuwankotta competed for Indonesia at the 2000 Summer Olympics in the women's doubles event partnered with Etty Tantri. After retiring from the badminton tournament, she became a badminton coach in Switzerland and France, and also found a Tuwankotta's Badminton Coaches and Tour in Indonesia.

== Achievements ==
=== Asian Championships ===
Women's doubles
Year	Venue	Partner	Opponent	Score	Result
1999	Kuala Lumpur Badminton Stadium; Kuala Lumpur, Malaysia	(Indonesia) Etty Tantri	(China) Ge Fei (China) Gu Jun	7–15, 6–15	Bronze
1997	Stadium Negara, Kuala Lumpur, Malaysia	(Indonesia) Etty Tantri	(China) Liu Lu (China) Qian Hong	10–15, 9–15	Bronze

=== Southeast Asian Games ===
Women's doubles
Year	Venue	Partner	Opponent	Score	Result
1999	Hassanal Bolkiah Sports Complex; Bandar Seri Begawan, Brunei	(Indonesia) Etty Tantri	(Indonesia) Emma Ermawati (Indonesia) Indarti Issolina	17–15, 15–6	Gold

=== IBF World Grand Prix ===
The World Badminton Grand Prix was sanctioned by the International Badminton Federation from 1983 to 2006.

Women's doubles
Year	Tournament	Partner	Opponent	Score	Result
1997	India Open	(Indonesia) Etty Tantri	(South Korea) Choi Ma-ree (South Korea) Lee Soon-deuk	15–8, 14–17, 15–5	(gold) Winner
1997	Polish Open	(Indonesia) Etty Tantri	(Chinese Taipei) Chen Li-chin (Chinese Taipei) Tsai Hui-min	12–15, 15–8, 15–9	(gold) Winner

=== IBF International ===
Women's doubles
Year	Tournament	Partner	Opponent	Score	Result
1997	French International	(Indonesia) Etty Tantri	(England) Ella Miles (England) Sara Sankey	14–17, 15–3, 15–7	(gold) Winner
2001	La Chaux-de-Fonds International	(Switzerland) Fabienne Baumeyer	(Russia) Anna Larchenko (Russia) Oksana Larchenko	7–2, 7–5, 7–1	(gold) Winner
2006	Austrian International	(Indonesia) Atu Rosalina	(Germany) Sandra Marinello (Germany) Kathrin Piotrowski	11–21, 21–19, 21–17	(gold) Winner

Mixed doubles
Year	Tournament	Partner	Opponent	Score	Result
2006	Swedish International	(Indonesia) Imam Sodikin	(Denmark) Jacob Chemnitz (Denmark) Julie Houmann	17–21, 23–21, 21–18	(gold) Winner
