= Etty Tantri =

Indonesian badminton player

Personal information
- Born: Eti Lesmina Tantra; 14 October 1975 (age 51) Selat Panjang, Kepulauan Meranti, Riau, Indonesia
- Height: 1.62 m (5 ft 4 in)
- Weight: 54 kg (119 lb)

Sport
- Country: United States
- Sport: Badminton
- Handedness: Right
- Event: Women's & mixed doubles

Women's & mixed doubles
- BWF profile
Medal record
Women's badminton
Representing Indonesia
Sudirman Cup
Silver medal – second place	2001 Seville	Mixed team
Bronze medal – third place	1999 Copenhagen	Mixed team
Uber Cup
Bronze medal – third place	2000 Kuala Lumpur	Women's team
Asian Championships
Silver medal – second place	2000 Jakarta	Women's doubles
Bronze medal – third place	1999 Kuala Lumpur	Women's doubles
Bronze medal – third place	1997 Kuala Lumpur	Women's doubles
Southeast Asian Games
Gold medal – first place	1999 Bandar Seri Begawan	Women's doubles
Gold medal – first place	1999 Bandar Seri Begawan	Women's team

Eti Lesmina Tantra (Chinese: 蒂·坦蒂; pinyin: Dì·tǎn dì; born 14 October 1975), is an Indonesian badminton player of Chinese descent. She has represented Indonesia and the United States in international tournaments.

== Career ==
Tantri who affiliate with Tangkas club, was selected to join the national team in 1993. She won her first title in 1997 India Open in the women's doubles partnered with Cynthia Tuwankotta. Together with Tuwankotta, she also won the 1997 French Open, becoming the first Indonesians to win a women's doubles title, and at the 1997 Polish Open. Tantri and Tuwankotta were the bronze medalists at the 1997 and 1999 Asian Championships. She claimed the gold medal for the Indonesian women's team and women's doubles (with Tuwankotta) at the 1999 Southeast Asian Games. Tantri competed in 2000 Olympic Games in Sydney with Tuwankotta as the eight seeds, but they were eliminated in the quarterfinals, defeated by Ge Fei and Gu Jun. Partnered with Minarti Timur, she won the women's doubles silver medal at the 2000 Asian Championships. In the mixed doubles, she won the 1997 Polish Open with Flandy Limpele, also the 2002 and 2003 U.S Open with Tony Gunawan. She was part of the national team that won the bronze medal at the 2000 Uber Cup, also the silver and bronze medals at the 2001 and 1999 Sudirman Cup.

== Personal life ==
Tantri married Tony Gunawan, a 2000 Olympic Games men's doubles gold medalist, on the 29th of July 2002 at the Monte Carlo Chapel in Las Vegas. They have two sons, Christopher and Leon.

== Achievements ==
=== Asian Championships ===
Women's doubles
Year	Venue	Partner	Opponent	Score	Result
1997	Stadium Negara; Kuala Lumpur, Malaysia	(Indonesia) Cynthia Tuwankotta	(China) Liu Lu (China) Qian Hong	10–15, 9–15	Bronze
1999	Kuala Lumpur Badminton Stadium; Kuala Lumpur, Malaysia	(Indonesia) Cynthia Tuwankotta	(China) Ge Fei (China) Gu Jun	7–15, 6–15	Bronze
2000	Istora Senayan; Jakarta, Indonesia	(Indonesia) Minarti Timur	(South Korea) Lee Hyo-jung (South Korea) Yim Kyung-jin	8–15, 13–15	Silver

=== Southeast Asian Games ===
Women's doubles
Year	Venue	Partner	Opponent	Score	Result
1999	Hassanal Bolkiah Sports Complex; Bandar Seri Begawan, Brunei	(Indonesia) Cynthia Tuwankotta	(Indonesia) Indarti Issolina (Indonesia) Emma Ermawati	17–15, 15–6	Gold

=== IBF World Grand Prix ===
The World Badminton Grand Prix sanctioned by International Badminton Federation (IBF) since 1983.

Women's doubles
Year	Tournament	Partner	Opponent	Score	Result
1995	Sydney Open	(Indonesia) Carmelita	(China) Peng Xinyong (China) Zhang Jin	9–15, 15–12, 4–15	(silver) Runner-up
1997	India Open	(Indonesia) Cynthia Tuwankotta	(South Korea) Choi Ma-ree (South Korea) Lee Soon-deuk	15–8, 14–17, 15–5	(gold) Winner
1997	Polish Open	(Indonesia) Cynthia Tuwankotta	(Chinese Taipei) Chen Li-chin (Chinese Taipei) Tsai Hui-min	12–15, 15–8, 15–9	(gold) Winner

Mixed doubles
Year	Tournament	Partner	Opponent	Score	Result
1997	Polish Open	(Indonesia) Flandy Limpele	(Indonesia) Imam Tohari (Indonesia) Emma Ermawati	15–7, 15–6	(gold) Winner
2002	U.S. Open	(Indonesia) Tony Gunawan	(England) Simon Archer (Sweden) Marina Andrievskaya	7–11, 11–4, 11–6	(gold) Winner
2003	U.S. Open	(United States) Tony Gunawan	(South Korea) Hwang Ji-man (South Korea) Lee Eun-woo	15–5, 15–9	(gold) Winner

=== IBF International ===
Women's doubles
Year	Tournament	Partner	Opponent	Score	Result
1997	French International	(Indonesia) Cynthia Tuwankotta	(England) Ella Miles (England) Sara Sankey	14–17, 15–3, 15–7	(gold) Winner
