= Tri Kusharjanto =

Indonesian badminton player (born 1974)

Personal information
- Born: 18 January 1974 (age 52) Yogyakarta, SR Yogyakarta, Indonesia
- Height: 1.67 m (5 ft 6 in)
- Weight: 60 kg (132 lb)
- Spouse: Sri Untari

Sport
- Country: Indonesia
- Sport: Badminton
- Handedness: Right

Men's & mixed doubles
- Highest ranking: 1 (with Minarti Timur January 1996)
- BWF profile
Medal record
Men's badminton
Representing Indonesia
Olympic Games
Silver medal – second place	2000 Sydney	Mixed doubles
World Championships
Bronze medal – third place	1997 Glasgow	Mixed doubles
World Cup
Gold medal – first place	1995 Jakarta	Mixed doubles
Silver medal – second place	1997 Yogyakarta	Mixed doubles
World Masters Games
Gold medal – first place	2017 Auckland	Men's doubles 35+
Gold medal – first place	2017 Auckland	Men's doubles 40+
Bronze medal – third place	2025 Taipei	Men's doubles 50+
Bronze medal – third place	2025 Taipei	Mixed doubles 50+
World Senior Championships
Gold medal – first place	2013 Ankara	Men's doubles 35+
Gold medal – first place	2015 Helsingborg	Men's doubles 40+
Gold medal – first place	2023 Jeonju	Men's doubles 45+
Sudirman Cup
Silver medal – second place	1995 Lausanne	Mixed team
Silver medal – second place	2001 Seville	Mixed team
Bronze medal – third place	1997 Glasgow	Mixed team
Bronze medal – third place	1999 Copenhagen	Mixed team
Bronze medal – third place	2003 Eindhoven	Mixed team
Thomas Cup
Gold medal – first place	2002 Guangzhou	Men's team
Bronze medal – third place	2004 Jakarta	Men's team
Asian Games
Gold medal – first place	1998 Bangkok	Men's team
Silver medal – second place	2002 Busan	Men's team
Bronze medal – third place	1998 Bangkok	Mixed doubles
Bronze medal – third place	2002 Busan	Men's doubles
Asian Championships
Gold medal – first place	1996 Surabaya	Mixed doubles
Gold medal – first place	2001 Manila	Men's doubles
Gold medal – first place	2004 Kuala Lumpur	Men's doubles
Bronze medal – third place	1999 Kuala Lumpur	Mixed doubles
Bronze medal – third place	2000 Jakarta	Mixed doubles
Bronze medal – third place	2001 Manila	Mixed doubles
Bronze medal – third place	2002 Bangkok	Men's doubles
Bronze medal – third place	2002 Bangkok	Mixed doubles
Asian Cup
Bronze medal – third place	1995 Qingdao	Mixed doubles
SEA Games
Gold medal – first place	1995 Chiang Mai	Mixed doubles
Gold medal – first place	1995 Chiang Mai	Men's team
Gold medal – first place	1997 Jakarta	Men's team
Silver medal – second place	1997 Jakarta	Mixed doubles

Tri Kusharjanto (born 18 January 1974) is a badminton player from Indonesia. His name also appears variously as Tri Kusharyanto, Trikus Harjanto, Trikus Heryanto, and Trikus Haryanto.

== Personal life ==
He married fellow former Asian Champions Sri Untari and together has a son named Rehan Naufal Kusharjanto who is also a badminton player and a winner of 2017 Asian Junior Championships.

== Career ==
Kusharjanto is a doubles specialist who achieved his greatest success in mixed doubles. Between 1994 and 2002 he won numerous international mixed doubles titles, the majority of them with Minarti Timur. These included the Thailand (1994, 1996), Indonesia (1995, 1996, 1997, 1998, 1999, 2001), Singapore (1995, 1998), Malaysia (1996, 1998, 2000), and Chinese Taipei (2002) Opens; the Badminton World Cup (1995), the World Badminton Grand Prix (1995), the SEA Games (1995), and the Badminton Asia Championships (1996). Though victories in badminton's three most prestigious events for individual players, the Olympics, the All England Championships, and the World Championships, eluded Kusharjanto, he and Timur came close in all three with a runner-up finish at the 1997 All Englands, a bronze medal at the 1997 World Championships in Glasgow, and a silver medal at the 2000 Olympics in Sydney. Though only occasionally chosen by the Indonesian Badminton Association to play international events in men's doubles, Kusharjanto has won some, most notably the Badminton Asia Championships with Bambang Suprianto in 2001 and with Sigit Budiarto in 2004. As a member of Indonesia's 2002 Thomas Cup team he helped his country to capture its thirteenth world team title by winning his championship round doubles match with Halim Haryanto.

== Olympic record ==
=== 1996 Summer Olympics ===
He competed in badminton at the 1996 Summer Olympics in mixed doubles with partner Minarti Timur. They were defeated in the quarter final by the eventual gold medalist, Kim Dong-moon and Gil Young-ah of South Korea.

=== 2000 Summer Olympics ===
He competed in badminton at the 2000 Summer Olympics in mixed doubles with partner Minarti Timur. They won the silver medal after being defeated by the Chinese pair Zhang Jun and Gao Ling in the final.

=== 2004 Summer Olympics ===
He competed in badminton at the 2004 Summer Olympics in men's doubles with partner Sigit Budiarto. They were defeated in the round of 32 by Robert Mateusiak and Michał Łogosz of Poland.

== Awards ==
Award	Year	Category	Result	Ref.
Government of Indonesia Awards	2021	Satyalancana Dharma Olahraga	Honored	

== Achievements ==
=== Olympic Games ===
Mixed doubles
Year	Venue	Partner	Opponent	Score	Result	Ref.
2000	The Dome, Sydney, Australia	(Indonesia) Minarti Timur	(China) Zhang Jun (China) Gao Ling	15–1, 13–15, 11–15	Silver	

=== World Championships ===
Mixed doubles
Year	Venue	Partner	Opponent	Score	Result
1997	Scotstoun Centre, Glasgow, Scotland	(Indonesia) Minarti Timur	(Denmark) Jens Eriksen (Denmark) Marlene Thomsen	15–8, 13–15, 15–17	Bronze

=== World Cup ===
Mixed doubles
Year	Venue	Partner	Opponent	Score	Result
1995	Istora Senayan, Jakarta, Indonesia	(Indonesia) Minarti Timur	(South Korea) Kim Dong-moon (South Korea) Kim Shin-young	15–9, 13–18, 15–12	Gold
1997	Among Rogo Sports Hall, Yogyakarta, Indonesia	(Indonesia) Minarti Timur	(China) Liu Yong (China) Ge Fei	15–12, 7–15, 10–15	Silver

=== World Masters Games ===
Men's doubles
Year	Age	Venue	Partner	Opponent	Score	Result	Ref.
2017	35+	Auckland Badminton Centre; Auckland, New Zealand	(United States) Tony Gunawan	(Czech Republic) Jan Fröhlich (Denmark) Carsten Loesch	21–11, 21–17	Gold	
2017	40+	Auckland Badminton Centre; Auckland, New Zealand	(Indonesia) Hariyanto Arbi	(United States) Tony Gunawan (Indonesia) Effendy Widjaja	22–20, 21–14	Gold	
2025	50+	Taipei Gymnasium; Taipei, Taiwan	(Indonesia) Hariyanto Arbi	(Chinese Taipei) Yang Chih-yu (Chinese Taipei) Liu Ying-hsiung	18–21, 21–19, 15–21	Bronze	

Mixed doubles
Year	Age	Venue	Partner	Opponent	Score	Result	Ref.
2025	50+	Taipei Gymnasium; Taipei, Taiwan	(Indonesia) Irene Gunarti	(Chinese Taipei) Hung Ta Yen (Chinese Taipei) Kao Shin-Li		Bronze	

=== World Senior Championships ===
Men's doubles
Year	Age	Venue	Partner	Opponent	Score	Result	Ref.
2013	35+	Ankara Spor Salunu Stadium; Ankara, Turkey	(Indonesia) Hariyanto Arbi	(England) Lee Clapham (England) Nick Ponting	21–16, 21–11	Gold	
2015	40+	Helsingborg Arena; Helsingborg, Sweden	(Indonesia) Hariyanto Arbi	(Denmark) Peter Rasmussen (Denmark) Thomas Stavngaard	21–19, 21–17	Gold	
2023	45+	Hwasan Indoor Stadium; Jeonju, South Korea	(United States) Tony Gunawan	(Thailand) Naruenart Chuaymak (Thailand) Thaweesak Koetsriphan	21–14, 21–13	Gold	

=== Asian Games ===
Men's doubles
Year	Venue	Partner	Opponent	Score	Result
2002	Gangseo Gymnasium; Busan, South Korea	(Indonesia) Halim Haryanto	(Thailand) Tesana Panvisvas (Thailand) Pramote Teerawiwatana	15–17, 8–15	Bronze

Mixed doubles
Year	Venue	Partner	Opponent	Score	Result
1998	Thammasat Gymnasium 2 Bangkok, Thailand	(Indonesia) Minarti Timur	(South Korea) Lee Dong-soo (South Korea) Yim Kyung-jin	16–17, 9–15	Bronze

=== Asian Championships ===
Men's doubles
Year	Venue	Partner	Opponent	Score	Result
2001	PhilSports Arena; Manila, Philippines	(Indonesia) Bambang Suprianto	(Indonesia) Tony Gunawan (Indonesia) Candra Wijaya	8–15, 15–13, 15–13	Gold
2002	Nimibutr Stadium; Bangkok, Thailand	(Indonesia) Halim Haryanto	(South Korea) Ha Tae-kwon (South Korea) Kim Dong-moon	6–15, 12–15	Bronze
2004	Kuala Lumpur Badminton Stadium; Kuala Lumpur, Malaysia	(Indonesia) Sigit Budiarto	(Indonesia) Halim Haryanto (Indonesia) Candra Wijaya	15–13, 15–5	Gold

Mixed doubles
Year	Venue	Partner	Opponent	Score	Result
1996	Pancasila Hall; Surabaya, Indonesia	(Indonesia) Lili Tampi	(South Korea) Kang Kyung-jin (South Korea) Kim Mee-hyang	15–1, 15–6	Gold
1999	Kuala Lumpur Badminton Stadium; Kuala Lumpur, Malaysia	(Indonesia) Zelin Resiana	(South Korea) Kim Dong-moon (South Korea) Ra Kyung-min	15–13, 11–15, 6–15	Bronze
2000	Istora Senayan; Jakarta, Indonesia	(Indonesia) Vita Marissa	(Indonesia) Wahyu Agung (Indonesia) Emma Ermawati	14–17, 3–15	Bronze
2001	PhilSports Arena; Manila, Philippines	(Indonesia) Emma Ermawati	(Indonesia) Bambang Suprianto (Indonesia) Minarti Timur	4–15, 11–15	Bronze
2002	Nimibutr Stadium; Bangkok, Thailand	(Indonesia) Emma Ermawati	(Thailand) Khunakorn Sudhisodhi (Thailand) Saralee Thungthongkam	7–11, 2–11	Bronze

=== Asian Cup ===
Mixed doubles
Year	Venue	Partner	Opponent	Score	Result
1995	Xinxing Gymnasium; Qingdao, China	(Indonesia) Minarti Timur	(China) Liu Jianjun (China) Sun Man	13–15, 5–15	Bronze

=== SEA Games ===
Mixed doubles
Year	Venue	Partner	Opponent	Score	Result
1995	Gymnasium 3, 700th Anniversary Sport Complex; Chiang Mai, Thailand	(Indonesia) Minarti Timur	(Indonesia) Denny Kantono (Indonesia) Eliza Nathanael	15–8, 15–4	Gold
1997	Asia-Africa hall, Gelora Bung Karno Sports Complex; Jakarta, Indonesia	(Indonesia) Minarti Timur	(Indonesia) Candra Wijaya (Indonesia) Eliza Nathanael	15–12, 7–15, 2–15	Silver

=== IBF World Grand Prix (16 titles, 11 runners-up) ===
The World Badminton Grand Prix has been sanctioned by the International Badminton Federation from 1983 to 2006.

Mixed doubles
Year	Tournament	Partner	Opponent	Score	Result
1994	Thailand Open	(Indonesia) Minarti Timur	(England) Nick Ponting (England) Joanne Goode	15–10, 15–12	(gold) Winner
1995	Japan Open	(Indonesia) Minarti Timur	(Denmark) Thomas Lund (Denmark) Marlene Thomsen	4–15, 17–14, 10–15	(silver) Runner-up
1995	Indonesia Open	(Indonesia) Minarti Timur	(Indonesia) Flandy Limpele (Indonesia) Rosalina Riseu	15–10, 15–5	(gold) Winner
1995	Singapore Open	(Indonesia) Minarti Timur	(South Korea) Kim Dong-moon (South Korea) Gil Young-ah	15–12, 9–15, 15–10	(gold) Winner
1995	U.S. Open	(Indonesia) Minarti Timur	(South Korea) Kim Dong-moon (South Korea) Gil Young-ah	7–15, 15–10, 13–15	(silver) Runner-up
1995	World Grand Prix Finals	(Indonesia) Minarti Timur	(England) Simon Archer (England) Julie Bradbury	15–8, 15–8	(gold) Winner
1996	Malaysia Open	(Indonesia) Minarti Timur	(Denmark) Michael Søgaard (Denmark) Rikke Olsen	15–7, 15–5	(gold) Winner
1996	Indonesia Open	(Indonesia) Minarti Timur	(Indonesia) Flandy Limpele (Indonesia) Rosalina Riseu	15–8, 15–1	(gold) Winner
1996	German Open	(Indonesia) Minarti Timur	(Denmark) Jens Eriksen (Denmark) Anne Mette Bille	15–1, 15–6	(gold) Winner
1996	Thailand Open	(Indonesia) Minarti Timur	(Indonesia) Flandy Limpele (Indonesia) Rosalina Riseu	15–5, 15–7	(gold) Winner
1996	World Grand Prix Finals	(Indonesia) Minarti Timur	(Denmark) Michael Søgaard (Denmark) Rikke Olsen	10–15, 11–15	(silver) Runner-up
1997	All England Open	(Indonesia) Minarti Timur	(China) Liu Yong (China) Ge Fei	10–15, 2–15	(silver) Runner-up
1997	Indonesia Open	(Indonesia) Minarti Timur	(Indonesia) Bambang Suprianto (Indonesia) Rosalina Riseu	15–11, 15–6	(gold) Winner
1997	World Grand Prix Finals	(Indonesia) Minarti Timur	(China) Liu Yong (China) Ge Fei	9–15, 13–15	(silver) Runner-up
1998	Malaysia Open	(Indonesia) Minarti Timur	(Denmark) Michael Søgaard (Denmark) Rikke Olsen	15–8, 15–18, 18–15	(gold) Winner
1998	Singapore Open	(Indonesia) Minarti Timur	(Denmark) Michael Søgaard (Denmark) Rikke Olsen	15–10, 15–8	(gold) Winner
1998	Indonesia Open	(Indonesia) Minarti Timur	(Denmark) Michael Søgaard (Denmark) Rikke Olsen	10–15, 15–8, 15–8	(gold) Winner
1999	Malaysia Open	(Indonesia) Minarti Timur	(Denmark) Michael Søgaard (Denmark) Rikke Olsen	4–15, 7–15	(silver) Runner-up
1999	Indonesia Open	(Indonesia) Minarti Timur	(Indonesia) Bambang Suprianto (Indonesia) Zelin Resiana	15–3, 15–4	(gold) Winner
1999	World Grand Prix Finals	(Indonesia) Minarti Timur	(South Korea) Kim Dong-moon (South Korea) Ra Kyung-min	7–15, 7–15	(silver) Runner-up
2000	Korea Open	(Indonesia) Minarti Timur	(South Korea) Kim Dong-moon (South Korea) Ra Kyung-min	13–15, 3–15	(silver) Runner-up
2000	Japan Open	(Indonesia) Minarti Timur	(China) Liu Yong (China) Ge Fei	5–15, 14–17	(silver) Runner-up
2000	Malaysia Open	(Indonesia) Minarti Timur	(South Korea) Kim Dong-moon (South Korea) Ra Kyung-min	7–15, 8–15	(silver) Runner-up
2000	World Grand Prix Finals	(Indonesia) Minarti Timur	(Denmark) Jens Eriksen (Denmark) Mette Schjoldager	7–8, 4–7, 4–7	(silver) Runner-up
2001	Indonesia Open	(Indonesia) Emma Ermawati	(Indonesia) Nova Widianto (Indonesia) Vita Marissa	7–5, 7–1, 2–7, 7–1	(gold) Winner
2001	Denmark Open	(Indonesia) Emma Ermawati	(England) Nathan Robertson (England) Gail Emms	7–5, 7–1, 7–4	(gold) Winner
2002	Chinese Taipei Open	(Indonesia) Emma Ermawati	(Indonesia) Nova Widianto (Indonesia) Vita Marissa	8–11, 13–11, 11–7	(gold) Winner

IBF Grand Prix tournament
IBF Grand Prix Finals tournament

=== BWF International Challenge/Series (3 titles, 1 runner-up) ===
Men's doubles
Year	Tournament	Partner	Opponent	Score	Result
2005	Surabaya Satellite	(Indonesia) Bambang Suprianto	(India) Rupesh Kumar K. T. (India) Sanave Thomas	15–9, 15–12	(gold) Winner

Mixed doubles
Year	Tournament	Partner	Opponent	Score	Result
2005	Surabaya Satellite	(Indonesia) Mona Santoso	(Indonesia) Bambang Suprianto (Indonesia) Minarti Timur	Walkover	(silver) Runner-up
2006	Surabaya Satellite	(Indonesia) Minarti Timur	(Indonesia) Bambang Suprianto (Indonesia) Eny Widiowati	21–10, 21–18	(gold) Winner
2007	Vietnam International	(Indonesia) Yunita Tetty	(Indonesia) Tontowi Ahmad (Indonesia) Yulianti	21–15, 21–17	(gold) Winner

BWF International Challenge tournament
BWF International Series tournament
