= Minarti Timur =

Indonesian badminton player (born 1968)

Personal information
- Born: 24 March 1968 (age 58) Surabaya, East Java, Indonesia
- Height: 1.63 m (5 ft 4 in)
- Weight: 55 kg (121 lb)

Sport
- Country: Indonesia
- Sport: Badminton
- Handedness: Right

Women's & mixed doubles
- Highest ranking: 1 (XD with Tri Kusharjanto January 1996)
Medal record
Women's badminton
Representing Indonesia
Olympic Games
Silver medal – second place	2000 Sydney	Mixed doubles
World Championships
Bronze medal – third place	1997 Glasgow	Mixed doubles
World Cup
Gold medal – first place	1995 Jakarta	Mixed doubles
Gold medal – first place	1996 Jakarta	Mixed doubles
Silver medal – second place	1997 Yogyakarta	Mixed doubles
Sudirman Cup
Gold medal – first place	1989 Jakarta	Mixed team
Silver medal – second place	1993 Birmingham	Mixed team
Silver medal – second place	1995 Lausanne	Mixed team
Silver medal – second place	2001 Seville	Mixed team
Bronze medal – third place	1997 Glasgow	Mixed team
Bronze medal – third place	1999 Copenhagen	Mixed team
Uber Cup
Bronze medal – third place	1990 Nagoya & Tokyo	Women's team
Bronze medal – third place	2000 Kuala Lumpur	Women's team
Asian Games
Silver medal – second place	1990 Beijing	Women's team
Bronze medal – third place	1998 Bangkok	Mixed doubles
Bronze medal – third place	1998 Bangkok	Women's team
Asian Championships
Gold medal – first place	2000 Jakarta	Mixed doubles
Silver medal – second place	2000 Jakarta	Women's doubles
Silver medal – second place	2001 Manila	Mixed doubles
Bronze medal – third place	1999 Kuala Lumpur	Mixed doubles
Asian Cup
Bronze medal – third place	1995 Qingdao	Mixed doubles
SEA Games
Gold medal – first place	1989 Kuala Lumpur	Women's team
Gold medal – first place	1993 Singapore	Women's team
Gold medal – first place	1995 Chiang Mai	Mixed doubles
Gold medal – first place	1995 Chiang Mai	Women's team
Gold medal – first place	1997 Jakarta	Women's team
Silver medal – second place	1989 Kuala Lumpur	Mixed doubles
Silver medal – second place	1993 Singapore	Mixed doubles
Silver medal – second place	1997 Jakarta	Mixed doubles

Minarti Timur (traditional Chinese: 許一敏; simplified Chinese: 许一敏; pinyin: Xǔ Yīmǐn; born 24 March 1968) is a former Indonesian badminton player who is affiliated with PB Djarum since 1987.

== Career ==
Though she won women's singles at the 1990 Dutch Open, Minarti was primarily a doubles player, particularly excelling in mixed doubles. During the 1990s and the early 2000s (decade), she won numerous international mixed doubles titles, the majority with Tri Kusharjanto but also, later, with Bambang Suprianto. These included the Thailand (1994, 1996), Indonesia (1995, 1996, 1997, 1998, 1999), Singapore (1995, 1998), Malaysia (1996, 1998, 2000), and Japan (2001) Opens; the SEA Games (1995); the World Badminton Grand Prix (1995); the Badminton World Cup (1996); and the Asian Championships (2000). She was part of the Indonesia winning team at the 1989 Sudirman Cup, helped the team defeat South Korea in group 1A, where she played in the mixed doubles with Aryono Miranat beating Park Joo-bong and Chung Myung-hee in straight games.

Minarti and Kusharjanto did not quite capture titles at any of badminton's three most prestigious tournaments for individual players: the Olympics, the World Championships, and the All-England Championships. They were runners-up at the 1997 All-Englands and bronze medalists at the 1997 IBF World Championships in Glasgow, Scotland. At the 2000 Olympics in Sydney, Australia they had to settle for a silver medal after losing an extremely close final to China's Zhang Jun and Gao Ling.

After retired from the national team, she moved to Philippines in 2003, and started a new career as a coach at the Philippines national badminton team. Timur also represented the Philippines in international tournaments. In 2016, she moved back to her home country, and later entered the Indonesia national badminton team as a women's singles assistant coach.

== Achievements ==
=== Olympic Games ===
Mixed doubles
Year	Venue	Partner	Opponent	Score	Result	Ref.
2000	The Dome, Sydney, Australia	(Indonesia) Tri Kusharjanto	(China) Zhang Jun (China) Gao Ling	15–1, 13–15, 11–15	Silver	

=== World Championships ===
Mixed doubles
Year	Venue	Partner	Opponent	Score	Result
1997	Scotstoun Centre, Glasgow, Scotland	(Indonesia) Tri Kusharjanto	(Denmark) Jens Eriksen (Denmark) Marlene Thomsen	15–8, 13–15, 15–17	Bronze

=== World Cup ===
Mixed doubles
Year	Venue	Partner	Opponent	Score	Result
1995	Istora Senayan; Jakarta, Indonesia	(Indonesia) Tri Kusharjanto	(South Korea) Kim Dong-moon (South Korea) Kim Shin-young	15–9, 13–18, 15–12	Gold
1996	Istora Senayan; Jakarta, Indonesia	(Indonesia) Sandiarto	(Indonesia) Flandy Limpele (Indonesia) Rosalina Riseu	17–14, 15–7	Gold
1997	Among Rogo Sports Hall; Yogyakarta, Indonesia	(Indonesia) Tri Kusharjanto	(China) Liu Yong (China) Ge Fei	15–12, 7–15, 10–15	Silver

=== Asian Games ===
Mixed doubles
Year	Venue	Partner	Opponent	Score	Result
1998	Thammasat Gymnasium 2 Bangkok, Thailand	(Indonesia) Tri Kusharjanto	(South Korea) Lee Dong-soo (South Korea) Yim Kyung-jin	16–17, 9–15	Bronze

=== Asian Championships ===
Women's doubles
Year	Venue	Partner	Opponent	Score	Result
2000	Istora Senayan; Jakarta, Indonesia	(Indonesia) Etty Tantri	(South Korea) Lee Hyo-jung (South Korea) Yim Kyung-jin	8–15, 13–15	Silver

Mixed doubles
Year	Venue	Partner	Opponent	Score	Result
1999	Kuala Lumpur Badminton Stadium; Kuala Lumpur, Malaysia	(Indonesia) Bambang Suprianto	(China) Liu Yong (China) Ge Fei	2–15, 5–15	Bronze
2000	Istora Senayan; Jakarta, Indonesia	(Indonesia) Bambang Suprianto	(Indonesia) Wahyu Agung (Indonesia) Emma Ermawati	15–10, 15–12	Gold
2001	PhilSports Arena; Manila, Philippines	(Indonesia) Bambang Suprianto	(South Korea) Kim Dong-moon (South Korea) Ra Kyung-min	15–11, 4–15, 3–15	Silver

=== Asian Cup ===
Mixed doubles
Year	Venue	Partner	Opponent	Score	Result
1995	Xinxing Gymnasium; Qingdao, China	(Indonesia) Tri Kusharjanto	(China) Liu Jianjun (China) Sun Man	13–15, 5–15	Bronze

=== SEA Games ===
Mixed doubles
Year	Venue	Partner	Opponent	Score	Result
1989	Stadium Negara; Kuala Lumpur, Malaysia	(Indonesia) Aryono Miranat	(Indonesia) Eddy Hartono (Indonesia) Verawaty Fajrin	17–16, 9–15, 2–15	Silver
1993	Singapore Badminton Hall; Singapore	(Indonesia) Denny Kantono	(Indonesia) Rudy Gunawan (Indonesia) Eliza Nathanael	6–15, 15–18	Silver
1995	Gymnasium 3, 700th Anniversary Sport Complex; Chiang Mai, Thailand	(Indonesia) Tri Kusharjanto	(Indonesia) Denny Kantono (Indonesia) Eliza Nathanael	15–8, 15–4	Gold
1997	Asia-Africa hall, Gelora Bung Karno Sports Complex; Jakarta, Indonesia	(Indonesia) Tri Kusharjanto	(Indonesia) Candra Wijaya (Indonesia) Eliza Nathanael	15–12, 7–15, 2–15	Silver

=== IBF World Grand Prix (16 titles, 14 runners-up) ===
The World Badminton Grand Prix has been sanctioned by the International Badminton Federation from 1983 to 2006.

Women's singles
Year	Tournament	Opponent	Score	Result
1990	Chinese Taipei Open	(South Korea) Chun Sung-suk	10–12, 11–1, 1–11	(silver) Runner-up
1990	Dutch Open	(Denmark) Pernille Nedergaard	11–4, 11–7	(gold) Winner

Women's doubles
Year	Tournament	Partner	Opponent	Score	Result
1997	Indonesia Open	(Indonesia) Finarsih	(Indonesia) Eliza Nathanael (Indonesia) Zelin Resiana	10–15, 5–15	(silver) Runner-up

Mixed doubles
Year	Tournament	Partner	Opponent	Score	Result
1994	Thailand Open	(Indonesia) Tri Kusharjanto	(England) Nick Ponting (England) Joanne Goode	15–10, 15–12	(gold) Winner
1995	Japan Open	(Indonesia) Tri Kusharjanto	(Denmark) Thomas Lund (Denmark) Marlene Thomsen	4–15, 17–14, 10–15	(silver) Runner-up
1995	Indonesia Open	(Indonesia) Tri Kusharjanto	(Indonesia) Flandy Limpele (Indonesia) Rosalina Riseu	15–10, 15–5	(gold) Winner
1995	Singapore Open	(Indonesia) Tri Kusharjanto	(South Korea) Kim Dong-moon (South Korea) Gil Young-ah	15–12, 9–15, 15–10	(gold) Winner
1995	U.S. Open	(Indonesia) Tri Kusharjanto	(South Korea) Kim Dong-moon (South Korea) Gil Young-ah	7–15, 15–10, 13–15	(silver) Runner-up
1995	World Grand Prix Finals	(Indonesia) Tri Kusharjanto	(England) Simon Archer (England) Julie Bradbury	15–8, 15–8	(gold) Winner
1996	Malaysia Open	(Indonesia) Tri Kusharjanto	(Denmark) Michael Søgaard (Denmark) Rikke Olsen	15–7, 15–5	(gold) Winner
1996	Indonesia Open	(Indonesia) Tri Kusharjanto	(Indonesia) Flandy Limpele (Indonesia) Rosalina Riseu	15–8, 15–1	(gold) Winner
1996	German Open	(Indonesia) Tri Kusharjanto	(Denmark) Jens Eriksen (Denmark) Anne Mette Bille	15–1, 15–6	(gold) Winner
1996	Thailand Open	(Indonesia) Tri Kusharjanto	(Indonesia) Flandy Limpele (Indonesia) Rosalina Riseu	15–5, 15–7	(gold) Winner
1996	World Grand Prix Finals	(Indonesia) Tri Kusharjanto	(Denmark) Michael Søgaard (Denmark) Rikke Olsen	10–15, 11–15	(silver) Runner-up
1997	All England Open	(Indonesia) Tri Kusharjanto	(China) Liu Yong (China) Ge Fei	10–15, 2–15	(silver) Runner-up
1997	Swiss Open	(Indonesia) Flandy Limpele	(China) Liu Yong (China) Ge Fei	9–15, 9–15	(silver) Runner-up
1997	Indonesia Open	(Indonesia) Tri Kusharjanto	(Indonesia) Bambang Suprianto (Indonesia) Rosalina Riseu	15–11, 15–6	(gold) Winner
1997	World Grand Prix Finals	(Indonesia) Tri Kusharjanto	(China) Liu Yong (China) Ge Fei	9–15, 13–15	(silver) Runner-up
1998	Malaysia Open	(Indonesia) Tri Kusharjanto	(Denmark) Michael Søgaard (Denmark) Rikke Olsen	15–8, 15–18, 18–15	(gold) Winner
1998	Singapore Open	(Indonesia) Tri Kusharjanto	(Denmark) Michael Søgaard (Denmark) Rikke Olsen	15–10, 15–8	(gold) Winner
1998	Indonesia Open	(Indonesia) Tri Kusharjanto	(Denmark) Michael Søgaard (Denmark) Rikke Olsen	10–15, 15–8, 15–8	(gold) Winner
1999	Malaysia Open	(Indonesia) Tri Kusharjanto	(Denmark) Michael Søgaard (Denmark) Rikke Olsen	4–15, 7–15	(silver) Runner-up
1999	Indonesia Open	(Indonesia) Tri Kusharjanto	(Indonesia) Bambang Suprianto (Indonesia) Zelin Resiana	15–3, 15–4	(gold) Winner
1999	World Grand Prix Finals	(Indonesia) Tri Kusharjanto	(South Korea) Kim Dong-moon (South Korea) Ra Kyung-min	7–15, 7–15	(silver) Runner-up
2000	Korea Open	(Indonesia) Tri Kusharjanto	(South Korea) Kim Dong-moon (South Korea) Ra Kyung-min	13–15, 3–15	(silver) Runner-up
2000	Japan Open	(Indonesia) Tri Kusharjanto	(China) Liu Yong (China) Ge Fei	5–15, 14–17	(silver) Runner-up
2000	Malaysia Open	(Indonesia) Tri Kusharjanto	(South Korea) Kim Dong-moon (South Korea) Ra Kyung-min	7–15, 8–15	(silver) Runner-up
2000	World Grand Prix Finals	(Indonesia) Tri Kusharjanto	(Denmark) Jens Eriksen (Denmark) Mette Schjoldager	7–8, 4–7, 4–7	(silver) Runner-up
2001	Japan Open	(Indonesia) Bambang Suprianto	(China) Liu Yong (China) Cheng Jiao	15–6, 14–17, 15–5	(gold) Winner
2002	Indonesia Open	(Indonesia) Bambang Suprianto	(Indonesia) Nova Widianto (Indonesia) Vita Marissa	11–7, 11–3	(gold) Winner

IBF Grand Prix tournament
IBF Grand Prix Finals tournament

=== IBF International (2 titles) ===
Mixed doubles
Year	Tournament	Partner	Opponent	Score	Result
2005	Surabaya Satellite	(Indonesia) Bambang Suprianto	(Indonesia) Tri Kusharjanto (Indonesia) Mona Santoso	Walkover	(gold) Winner
2006	Surabaya Satellite	(Indonesia) Tri Kusharjanto	(Indonesia) Bambang Suprianto (Indonesia) Eny Widiowati	21–10, 21–18	(gold) Winner
