= Emma Ermawati =

Indonesian badminton player

Personal information
- Born: 6 October 1976 (age 50) Bandung, West Java, Indonesia

Sport
- Country: Indonesia
- Sport: Badminton
- BWF profile
Medal record
Women's badminton
Representing Indonesia
World Cup
Bronze medal – third place	1997 Yogyakarta	Mixed doubles
Sudirman Cup
Bronze medal – third place	1997 Glasgow	Mixed team
Bronze medal – third place	2003 Eindhoven	Mixed team
Asian Championships
Silver medal – second place	2000 Jakarta	Mixed doubles
Bronze medal – third place	2001 Manila	Mixed doubles
Bronze medal – third place	2002 Bangkok	Mixed doubles
SEA Games
Gold medal – first place	1999 Bandar Seri Begawan	Women's team
Gold medal – first place	2001 Kuala Lumpur	Women's team
Silver medal – second place	1999 Bandar Seri Begawan	Women's doubles
Silver medal – second place	2001 Kuala Lumpur	Mixed doubles
Bronze medal – third place	1999 Bandar Seri Begawan	Mixed doubles

Emma Ermawati (born 6 October 1976) is a retired badminton player from Indonesia who specialized in doubles events. She competed at the 2002 Asian Games in Busan, South Korea.

== Personal life ==
Ermawati husband, Budi Santoso, also a former Indonesian badminton player.

== Achievements ==
=== World Cup ===
Mixed doubles
Year	Venue	Partner	Opponent	Score	Result
1997	Among Rogo Sports Hall; Yogyakarta, Indonesia	(Indonesia) Imam Tohari	(Indonesia) Tri Kusharjanto (Indonesia) Minarti Timur	4–15, 3–15	Bronze

=== Asian Championships ===
Mixed doubles
Year	Venue	Partner	Opponent	Score	Result
2000	Istora Senayan; Jakarta, Indonesia	(Indonesia) Wahyu Agung	(Indonesia) Bambang Suprianto (Indonesia) Minarti Timur	10–15, 12–15	Silver
2001	PhilSports Arena; Manila, Philippines	(Indonesia) Tri Kusharjanto	(Indonesia) Bambang Suprianto (Indonesia) Minarti Timur	4–15, 11–15	Bronze
2002	Nimibutr Stadium; Bangkok, Thailand	(Indonesia) Tri Kusharjanto	(Thailand) Khunakorn Sudhisodhi (Thailand) Saralee Thungthongkam	7–11, 2–11	Bronze

=== SEA Games ===
Women's doubles
Year	Venue	Partner	Opponent	Score	Result
1999	Hassanal Bolkiah Sports Complex; Bandar Seri Begawan, Brunei	(Indonesia) Indarti Issolina	(Indonesia) Etty Tantri (Indonesia) Cynthia Tuwankotta	15–17, 6–15	Silver

Mixed doubles
Year	Venue	Partner	Opponent	Score	Result
1999	Hassanal Bolkiah Sports Complex; Bandar Seri Begawan, Brunei	(Indonesia) Wahyu Agung	(Malaysia) Chew Choon Eng (Malaysia) Chor Hooi Yee	15–9, 10–15, 4–15	Bronze
2001	Malawati Stadium; Selangor, Malaysia	(Indonesia) Bambang Suprianto	(Indonesia) Nova Widianto (Indonesia) Vita Marissa	15–3, 7–15, 15–17	Silver

=== IBF World Grand Prix (6 titles, 3 runners-up) ===
The World Badminton Grand Prix has been sanctioned by the International Badminton Federation from 1983 to 2006.

Women's doubles
Year	Tournament	Partner	Opponent	Score	Result
1995	Polish Open	(Indonesia) Indarti Issolina	(Denmark) Mette Pedersen (Denmark) Majken Vange	15–13, 15–8	(gold) Winner
1995	Brunei Open	(Indonesia) Indarti Issolina	(Indonesia) Eny Oktaviani (Indonesia) Nonong Denis Zanati	11–15, 12–15	(silver) Runner-up
1999	Thailand Open	(Indonesia) Vita Marissa	(China) Gao Ling (China) Qin Yiyuan	8–15, 2–15	(silver) Runner-up

Mixed doubles
Year	Tournament	Partner	Opponent	Score	Result
1997	India Open	(Indonesia) Imam Tohari	(Malaysia) Lee Chee Leong (Malaysia) Lee Yin Yin	15–3, 15–9	(gold) Winner
1997	Polish Open	(Indonesia) Imam Tohari	(Indonesia) Flandy Limpele (Indonesia) Etty Tantri	7–15, 6–15	(silver) Runner-up
2001	Malaysia Open	(Indonesia) Bambang Suprianto	(China) Liu Yong (China) Zhang Jiewen	7–8, 6–8, 7–2, 7–2, 7–2	(gold) Winner
2001	Indonesia Open	(Indonesia) Tri Kusharjanto	(Indonesia) Nova Widianto (Indonesia) Vita Marissa	7–5, 7–1, 2–7, 7–1	(gold) Winner
2001	Denmark Open	(Indonesia) Tri Kusharjanto	(England) Nathan Robertson (England) Gail Emms	7–5, 7–1, 7–4	(gold) Winner
2002	Chinese Taipei Open	(Indonesia) Tri Kusharjanto	(Indonesia) Nova Widianto (Indonesia) Vita Marissa	8–11, 13–11, 11–7	(gold) Winner

IBF Grand Prix tournament
IBF Grand Prix Finals tournament

=== IBF Junior International ===
Girls' doubles
Year	Tournament	Partner	Opponent	Score	Result	Ref.
1993	Dutch Junior	(Indonesia) Indarti Issolina	(Japan) Takae Masumo (Japan) Chikako Nakayama	15–9, 15–4	(gold) Winner	
