= Ling Wan Ting =

Hong Kong badminton player (born 1980)

Ling Wan Ting 凌婉婷
Personal information
- Born: 24 November 1980 (age 45)

Sport
- Country: Hong Kong
- Sport: Badminton
- Handedness: Right
- Event: Doubles

Doubles
- BWF profile
Medal record
Women's badminton
Representing Hong Kong
Uber Cup
Bronze medal – third place	2002 Guangzhou	Women's team
Asian Games
Bronze medal – third place	2002 Busan	Women's team
Asian Championships
Bronze medal – third place	2001 Manila	Women's singles
Bronze medal – third place	2003 Jakarta	Women's singles

Ling Wan Ting (Chinese: 凌婉婷; Jyutping: ling4 jyun2 ting4; born 24 November 1980) is a badminton player from Hong Kong.

She played badminton at the 2004 Summer Olympics, losing to Cheng Shao-chieh of Chinese Taipei in the round of 32.
