= Chen Li-chin =

Taiwanese badminton player

Chen Li-chin 陳儷今
Personal information
- Born: 8 August 1976 (age 50)
- Height: 1.68 m (5 ft 6 in)
- Weight: 66 kg (146 lb)

Sport
- Country: Taiwan
- Sport: Badminton
- Handedness: Left
- Event: Women's doubles

Women's doubles
- BWF profile
Medal record
Women's badminton
Representing Chinese Taipei
Asian Championships
| Bronze medal – third place | 1997 Kuala lumpur | Women's doubles |

Chen Li-chin (Chinese: 陳儷今; pinyin: Chén Lìjīn; born 8 August 1976) is a former Taiwanese badminton player. Chen was the top national ranked in the women's doubles event partnered with Tsai Hui-min in eight consecutive years. She and Tsai represented Chinese Taipei at the 1996 and 2000 Summer Olympics.

== Achievements ==
=== Asian Championships ===
Women's doubles
| Year | Venue | Partner | Opponent | Score | Result |
|---|---|---|---|---|---|
| 1997 | Kuala Lumpur, Malaysia | (Chinese Taipei) Tsai Hui-min | (China) Liu Zhong (China) Huang Nanyan | 7–15, 9–15 | Bronze |

=== IBF World Grand Prix ===
The World Badminton Grand Prix sanctioned by International Badminton Federation (IBF) since 1983.

Women's doubles
| Year | Tournament | Partner | Opponent | Score | Result |
|---|---|---|---|---|---|
| 1997 | Polish Open | (Chinese Taipei) Tsai Hui-min | (Indonesia) Eti Tantra (Indonesia) Cynthia Tuwankotta | 15–12, 8–15, 9–15 | (silver) Runner-up |

=== IBF International ===
Women's doubles
| Year | Tournament | Partner | Opponent | Score | Result |
|---|---|---|---|---|---|
| 1998 | French Open | (Chinese Taipei) Tsai Hui-min | (Bulgaria) Diana Koleva (Bulgaria) Neli Nedjalkova | 15–6, 15–9 | (gold) Winner |
| 1997 | Chinese Taipei International | (Chinese Taipei) Tsai Hui-min | (Chinese Taipei) Chen Mei-cun (Chinese Taipei) Peng Ju-yu | 15–0, 15–7 | (gold) Winner |
| 1995 | Austrian International | (Chinese Taipei) Tsai Hui-min | (Germany) Nicole Grether (Germany) Katrin Schmidt | 15–6, 15–12 | (gold) Winner |
