= Yim Kyung-jin =

South Korean badminton player

Personal information
- Born: 23 April 1978 (age 48)
- Height: 1.62 m (5 ft 4 in)
- Weight: 56 kg (123 lb)

Sport
- Country: South Korea
- Sport: Badminton
- Handedness: Left
- Event: Women's & mixed doubles

Women's & mixed doubles
- BWF profile
Medal record
Women's badminton
Representing South Korea
Sudirman Cup
Gold medal – first place	2003 Eindhoven	Mixed team
Uber Cup
Bronze medal – third place	2000 Kuala Lumpur	Women's team
Asian Games
Silver medal – second place	1998 Bangkok	Mixed doubles
Silver medal – second place	1998 Bangkok	Women's team
Asian Championships
Gold medal – first place	2000 Jakarta	Women's doubles
Bronze medal – third place	1998 Bangkok	Women's doubles
East Asian Games
Gold medal – first place	1997 Busan	Mixed doubles
Silver medal – second place	1997 Busan	Women's team
World Junior Championships
Bronze medal – third place	1996 Silkeborg	Girls' doubles

Yim Kyung-jin (Korean: 임경진; born 23 April 1978; also known as Yim Jae-eun) is a South Korean badminton player. Yim was crowned as the women's doubles champion at the 2000 Asian Championships partnered with Lee Hyo-jung. She and Lee also competed at the 2000 Summer Olympics in Sydney, Australia.

== Achievements ==
=== Asian Games ===
Mixed doubles
Year	Venue	Partner	Opponent	Score	Result
1998	Thammasat Gymnasium 2 Bangkok, Thailand	(South Korea) Lee Dong-soo	(South Korea) Kim Dong-moon (South Korea) Ra Kyung-min	6–15, 8–15	Silver

=== Asian Championships ===
Women's doubles
Year	Venue	Partner	Opponent	Score	Result
1998	Nimibutr Stadium; Bangkok, Thailand	(South Korea) Chung Jae-hee	(China) Qin Yiyuan (China) Tang Hetian	5–15, 5–15	Bronze
2000	Istora Senayan; Jakarta, Indonesia	(South Korea) Lee Hyo-jung	(Indonesia) Etty Tantri (Indonesia) Minarti Timur	15–8, 15–13	Gold

=== East Asian Games ===
Mixed doubles
Year	Venue	Partner	Opponent	Score	Result
1997	Pukyong National University Gymnasium; Busan, South Korea	(South Korea) Lee Dong-soo	(China) Yang Ming (China) Zhang Jin	15–11, 15–7	Gold

=== World Junior Championships ===
Girls' doubles
Year	Venue	Partner	Opponent	Score	Result
1996	Silkeborg Hallerne; Silkeborg, Denmark	(South Korea) Chung Jae-hee	(China) Gao Ling (China) Yang Wei	15–12, 10–15, 11–15	Bronze

=== IBF World Grand Prix ===
The World Badminton Grand Prix was sanctioned by the International Badminton Federation from 1983 to 2006.

Women's doubles
Year	Tournament	Partner	Opponent	Score	Result
1997	Chinese Taipei Open	(South Korea) Park Soo-yun	(Japan) Haruko Matsuda (Japan) Yoshiko Iwata	15–12, 15–8	(gold) Winner
2003	Thailand Open	(South Korea) Lee Hyo-jung	(China) Zhao Tingting (China) Wei Yili	9–11, 11–5, 6–11	(silver) Runner-up

=== BWF International ===
Women's doubles
Year	Tournament	Partner	Opponent	Score	Result
1999	Hungarian International	(South Korea) Lee Hyo-jung	(South Korea) Jung Yeon-kyung (South Korea) Kim So-yeon	15–9, 15–13	(gold) Winner
1999	Australian International	(South Korea) Chung Jae-hee	(South Korea) Ra Kyung-min (South Korea) Lee Hyo-jung	16–17, 15–6, 3–15	(silver) Runner-up
1999	Norwegian International	(South Korea) Lee Hyo-jung	(South Korea) Jung Yeon-kyung (South Korea) Kim So-yeon	15–7, 15–3	(gold) Winner
2002	Malaysia Satellite	(South Korea) Chung Jae-hee	(South Korea) Jung Yeon-kyung (South Korea) Lee Kyung-won	11–2, 3–11, 11–8	(gold) Winner
2010	Singapore International	(South Korea) Lee Se-rang	(Indonesia) Jenna Gozali (Indonesia) Aprilsasi Putri Lejarsar Variella	21–19, 21–12	(silver) Runner-up

Mixed doubles
Year	Tournament	Partner	Opponent	Score	Result
1999	Hungarian International	(South Korea) Kim Yong-hyun	(South Korea) Yim Bang-eun (South Korea) Lee Hyo-jung	5–15, 15–9, 15–3	(gold) Winner
1999	Norwegian International	(South Korea) Kim Yong-hyun	(Denmark) Ove Svejstrup (Denmark) Britta Andersen	9–15, 15–8, 15–9	(gold) Winner
2010	Singapore International	(South Korea) Lee Jae-jin	(Hong Kong) Yohan Hadikusumo Wiratama (Hong Kong) Tse Ying Suet	13–21, 19–21	(silver) Runner-up
