= Tsai Hui-min =

Taiwanese badminton player

Tsai Hui-min 蔡慧敏
Personal information
- Born: 6 February 1976 (age 50)
- Height: 1.66 m (5 ft 5 in)
- Weight: 58 kg (128 lb)

Sport
- Country: Taiwan
- Sport: Badminton
- Handedness: Right
- Event: Women's doubles

Women's doubles
- BWF profile
Medal record
Women's badminton
Representing Chinese Taipei
World Senior Championships
Bronze medal – third place	2025 Pattaya	Women's doubles 40+
Asian Championships
Bronze medal – third place	1997 Kuala lumpur	Women's doubles

Tsai Hui-min (Chinese: 蔡慧敏; pinyin: Cài Huìmǐn; born 6 February 1976) is a former Taiwanese badminton player. She represented Chinese Taipei at the 1996 and 2000 Summer Olympics in the women's doubles event partnered with Chen Li-chin. They were one of eight pairs that qualified and competed at the 2000 World Grand Prix Finals in Brunei.

== Achievements ==
=== World Senior Championships ===
Women's doubles

Year	Age	Venue	Partner	Opponent	Score	Result	Ref
2025	40+	Eastern National Sports Training Centre, Pattaya, Thailand	(Chinese Taipei) Teng Tao-chun	(Romania) Florentina Constantinescu (Romania) Irina Popescu	11–21, 15–21	Bronze	

=== Asian Championships ===
Women's doubles
Year	Venue	Partner	Opponent	Score	Result
1997	Stadium Negara; Kuala Lumpur, Malaysia	(Chinese Taipei) Chen Li-chin	(China) Liu Zhong (China) Huang Nanyan	7–15, 9–15	Bronze

=== IBF World Grand Prix ===
The World Badminton Grand Prix sanctioned by International Badminton Federation (IBF) since 1983.

Women's doubles
Year	Tournament	Partner	Opponent	Score	Result
1997	Polish Open	(Chinese Taipei) Chen Li-chin	(Indonesia) Eti Tantra (Indonesia) Cynthia Tuwankotta	15–12, 8–15, 9–15	(silver) Runner-up

=== IBF International ===
Women's doubles
Year	Tournament	Partner	Opponent	Score	Result
1995	Austrian International	(Chinese Taipei) Chen Li-chin	(Germany) Nicole Grether (Germany) Katrin Schmidt	15–6, 15–12	(gold) Winner
1997	Chinese Taipei International	(Chinese Taipei) Chen Li-chin	(Chinese Taipei) Chen Mei-cun (Chinese Taipei) Peng Ju-yu	15–0, 15–7	(gold) Winner
1998	French Open	(Chinese Taipei) Chen Li-chin	(Bulgaria) Diana Koleva (Bulgaria) Neli Nedyalkova	15–6, 15–9	(gold) Winner
