= 1993 IBF World Championships – Women's doubles =

Badminton championships

Women's doubles at the 1993 IBF World Championships
- Venue: National Indoor Arena
- Location: Birmingham, England
- Dates: May 31, 1993 – June 6, 1993

Medalists
gold medal	Nong Qunhua; Zhou Lei	China
silver medal	Chen Ying; Wu Yuhong	China
bronze medal	Chung So-young; Gil Young-ah	South Korea
bronze medal	Lotte Olsen; Lisbeth Stuer-Lauridsen	Denmark

The 8th IBF World Championships (World Badminton Championships) were held in Birmingham, England in 1993. Following the results of the women's doubles.

== Main stage ==
=== Section 1 ===
First round
(China) Nong Qunhua (China) Zhou Lei	15	15
(Malaysia) Zamaliah Sidek (Malaysia) Wong Mee Hung	1	7
(Belarus) Tatiana Gerassimovitch (Belarus) Vlada Chernyavskaya	17	15
(Canada) Milaine Cloutier (Canada) Robbyn Hermitage	8	8
(Thailand) Ladawan Mulasartsatorn (Thailand) Piyathip Sansaniyakulvilai	15	15
(Pakistan) Shamim Akhgar (Pakistan) Zarina Jamal	0	1
(New Zealand) Liao Yue Jin (New Zealand) Rhona Robertson	15	15
(Malta) Jo'Anne Grech (Malta) Rachel Williams	1	3
(Sweden) Catrine Bengtsson (Sweden) Maria Bengtsson	w.o.
(Nigeria) Obiageli Olorunsola (Nigeria) Dayo Oyewusi
(Poland) Bożena Bąk (Poland) Bożena Haracz	15	11	15
(United States) Andrea Andersson (United States) Liz Aronsohn	7	15	11
(Indonesia) Finarsih (Indonesia) Lili Tampi	15	15
(India) Manjusha Kanwar (India) P. V. V. Lakshmi	4	3
(Peru) Lorena Blanco (Canada) Caroline Thorn	15	15
(Ukraine) Tatyana Litvinenko (Ukraine) Natalia Melnikova	9	10

Second round
(China) Nong Qunhua (China) Zhou Lei	15	15
(Belarus) Tatiana Gerassimovitch (Belarus) Vlada Chernyavskaya	1	7
(Thailand) Ladawan Mulasartsatorn (Thailand) Piyathip Sansaniyakulvilai	15	15
(New Zealand) Liao Yue Jin (New Zealand) Rhona Robertson	5	5
(Sweden) Catrine Bengtsson (Sweden) Maria Bengtsson	15	15
(Poland) Bożena Bąk (Poland) Bożena Haracz	5	6
(Indonesia) Finarsih (Indonesia) Lili Tampi	15	15
(Peru) Lorena Blanco (Canada) Caroline Thorn	4	6

Third round
(China) Nong Qunhua (China) Zhou Lei	15	15
(Thailand) Ladawan Mulasartsatorn (Thailand) Piyathip Sansaniyakulvilai	8	6
(Sweden) Catrine Bengtsson (Sweden) Maria Bengtsson	18	4	15
(Indonesia) Finarsih (Indonesia) Lili Tampi	14	15	11

Quarterfinals
(China) Nong Qunhua (China) Zhou Lei	13	18	15
(Sweden) Catrine Bengtsson (Sweden) Maria Bengtsson	15	15	12

=== Section 2 ===
First round
(Denmark) Lotte Olsen (Denmark) Lisbet Stuer-Lauridsen	15	15
(Australia) Rhonda Cator (Australia) Michelle O'Neill	11	1
(South Korea) Jang Hye-ock (South Korea) Kim Shin-young	w.o.
(Nepal) Rajani Joshi Shrestha (Nepal) Subha Shrestha
(England) Julie Bradbury (England) Sara Sankey	15	15
(Germany) Karen Neumann (Germany) Nicole Baldewein	12	10
(Wales) Kelly Morgan (Wales) Gail Osborne	w.o.
(Mexico) Veronica Estrada (Mexico) Norma Hernandez
(China) Lin Yanfen (China) Yao Fen	15	15
(Austria) Gabriele Kumpfmüller (Austria) Brigitte Langthaler	1	3
(Finland) Susanna Kauhanen (Finland) Nina Koho	15	15
(Norway) Sissel Linderoth (Norway) Lillian Olavesen	6	7
(Japan) Haruko Matsuda (Japan) Aiko Miyamura	15	15
(France) Sandra Dimbour (France) Sandrine Lefèvre	2	4
(Russia) Natalja Ivanova (Russia) Julia Martynenko	15	15
(Scotland) Jillian Haldane (Scotland) Aileen Travers	6	5

Second round
(Denmark) Lotte Olsen (Denmark) Lisbet Stuer-Lauridsen	15	15
(South Korea) Jang Hye-ock (South Korea) Kim Shin-young	8	11
(England) Julie Bradbury (England) Sara Sankey	15	15
(Wales) Kelly Morgan (Wales) Gail Osborne	1	1
(China) Lin Yanfen (China) Yao Fen	15	15
(Finland) Susanna Kauhanen (Finland) Nina Koho	0	1
(Japan) Haruko Matsuda (Japan) Aiko Miyamura	15	15
(Russia) Natalja Ivanova (Russia) Julia Martynenko	6	5

Third round
(Denmark) Lotte Olsen (Denmark) Lisbet Stuer-Lauridsen	15	18
(England) Julie Bradbury (England) Sara Sankey	10	17
(China) Lin Yanfen (China) Yao Fen	8	15	15
(Japan) Haruko Matsuda (Japan) Aiko Miyamura	15	5	6

Quarterfinals
(Denmark) Lotte Olsen (Denmark) Lisbet Stuer-Lauridsen	15	13	17
(China) Lin Yanfen (China) Yao Fen	12	15	16

=== Section 3 ===
First round
(China) Chen Ying (China) Wu Yuhong	18	15
(France) Virginie Delvingt (France) Christelle Mol	4	2
(England) Joanne Goode (England) Alison Humby	18	15
(Norway) Tove Hol (Norway) Camilla Wright	17	4
(Japan) Tomomi Matsuo (Japan) Kyoko Sasage	15	15
(Malaysia) Lee Wai Leng (Malaysia) Tan Lee Wai	1	3
(Russia) Marina Andrievskaya (Russia) Marina Yakusheva	15	15
(Germany) Sandra Beißel (Germany) Nicole Grether	6	8
(Denmark) Marlene Thomsen (Denmark) Anne Mette van Dijk	w.o.
(Wales) Rachael Phipps (Wales) Hilary Tarleton
(Switzerland) Francine Carrel (Switzerland) Bettina Villars	15	15
(Slovenia) Maja Nagode (Slovenia) Mateja Slatnar	5	2
(Sweden) Christine Magnusson (Sweden) Lim Xiaoqing	w.o.
(Mexico) Guadalupe Ambriz (Mexico) Ana Laura de la Torre Saavedra
(Scotland) Gillian Martin (Scotland) Jennifer Williamson	15	15
(Bulgaria) Neli Boteva (Bulgaria) Victoria Hristova	10	10

Second round
(China) Chen Ying (China) Wu Yuhong	15	15
(England) Joanne Goode (England) Alison Humby	7	2
(Japan) Tomomi Matsuo (Japan) Kyoko Sasage	15	15
(Russia) Marina Andrievskaya (Russia) Marina Yakusheva	6	4
(Denmark) Marlene Thomsen (Denmark) Anne Mette van Dijk	15	15
(Switzerland) Francine Carrel (Switzerland) Bettina Villars	5	7
(Sweden) Christine Magnusson (Sweden) Lim Xiaoqing	15	15
(Scotland) Gillian Martin (Scotland) Jennifer Williamson	1	8

Third round
(China) Chen Ying (China) Wu Yuhong	15	15
(Japan) Tomomi Matsuo (Japan) Kyoko Sasage	10	11
(Denmark) Marlene Thomsen (Denmark) Anne Mette van Dijk	15	9	15
(Sweden) Christine Magnusson (Sweden) Lim Xiaoqing	6	15	5

Quarterfinals
(China) Chen Ying (China) Wu Yuhong	15	14	15
(Denmark) Marlene Thomsen (Denmark) Anne Mette van Dijk	4	18	11

=== Section 4 ===
First round
(South Korea) Chung So-young (South Korea) Gil Young-ah	15	15
(Canada) Si-An Deng (Canada) Denyse Julien	8	11
(Czech Republic) Jitka Lacinová (Czech Republic) Eva Lacinová	w.o.
(Nigeria) Bridget Ibenero (Nigeria) Bisi Tiamiyu
(Indonesia) Eliza Nathanael (Indonesia) Zelin Resiana	18	15
(Australia) Lisa Campbell (Australia) Amanda Hardy	17	7
(United States) Ann French (United States) Linda French	w.o.
(Poland) Monika Lipińska (Poland) Sylwia Rutkiewicz
(England) Gillian Clark (England) Gillian Gowers	15	15
(New Zealand) Sheree Jefferson (Republic of Ireland) Sonya McGinn	6	8
(Netherlands) Eline Coene (Netherlands) Erica van den Heuvel	15	15
(Hong Kong) Chung Hoi Yuk (Hong Kong) Wong Chun Fan	5	12
(Austria) Sabine Aberer (Austria) Irina Serova	17	15
(Ukraine) Irina Koloskova (Ukraine) Elena Nozdran	9	12
(Iceland) Guðrún Júlíusdóttir (Iceland) Birna Petersen	w.o.
(Mexico) Guadalupe Ambriz (Mexico) Ana Laura de la Torre Saavedra

Second round
(South Korea) Chung So-young (South Korea) Gil Young-ah	w.o.
(Czech Republic) Jitka Lacinová (Czech Republic) Eva Lacinová
(Indonesia) Eliza Nathanael (Indonesia) Zelin Resiana	15	15
(United States) Ann French (United States) Linda French	7	7
(England) Gillian Clark (England) Gillian Gowers	15	15
(Netherlands) Eline Coene (Netherlands) Erica van den Heuvel	9	7
(Austria) Sabine Aberer (Austria) Irina Serova	15	15
(Iceland) Guðrún Júlíusdóttir (Iceland) Birna Petersen	3	4

Third round
(South Korea) Chung So-young (South Korea) Gil Young-ah	2	15	15
(Indonesia) Eliza Nathanael (Indonesia) Zelin Resiana	15	10	6
(England) Gillian Clark (England) Gillian Gowers	15	15
(Austria) Sabine Aberer (Austria) Irina Serova	5	1

Quarterfinals
(South Korea) Chung So-young (South Korea) Gil Young-ah	12	15	15
(England) Gillian Clark (England) Gillian Gowers	15	2	2

== Final stage ==
Quarterfinals
(China) Nong Qunhua (China) Zhou Lei	13	18	15
(Sweden) Catrine Bengtsson (Sweden) Maria Bengtsson	15	15	12
(Denmark) Lotte Olsen (Denmark) Lisbet Stuer-Lauridsen	15	13	17
(China) Lin Yanfen (China) Yao Fen	12	15	16
(China) Chen Ying (China) Wu Yuhong	15	14	15
(Denmark) Marlene Thomsen (Denmark) Anne Mette van Dijk	4	18	11
(South Korea) Chung So-young (South Korea) Gil Young-ah	12	15	15
(England) Gillian Clark (England) Gillian Gowers	15	2	2

Semifinals
(China) Nong Qunhua (China) Zhou Lei	15	15
(Denmark) Lotte Olsen (Denmark) Lisbet Stuer-Lauridsen	2	13
(China) Chen Ying (China) Wu Yuhong	15	6	15
(South Korea) Chung So-young (South Korea) Gil Young-ah	7	15	11

Final
(China) Nong Qunhua (China) Zhou Lei	15	15
(China) Chen Ying (China) Wu Yuhong	5	10
