= Badminton at the 1994 Asian Games – Women's doubles =

Women's doubles at the 1994 Asian Games
- Venue: Tsuru Memorial Gymnasium
- Dates: 12–15 October
- Competitors: 26 from 7 nations

Medalists
gold medal	Shim Eun-jung; Jang Hye-ock	South Korea
silver medal	Chung So-young; Gil Young-ah	South Korea
bronze medal	Ge Fei; Gu Jun	China
bronze medal	Tomomi Matsuo; Kyoko Sasage	Japan

The badminton women's doubles tournament at the 1994 Asian Games in Hiroshima took place from 12 October to 15 October at Tsuru Memorial Gymnasium.

The South Korea duo of Shim Eun-jung and Jang Hye-ock won the gold in this tournament. Another Korean team of Chung So-young and Gil Young-ah finished second they lost the final 2–0, Chinese team of Ge Fei and Gu Jun and Japanese team of Tomomi Matsuo and Kyoko Sasage shared the bronze medal.

== Schedule ==
All times are Japan Standard Time (UTC+09:00)

Date	Time	Event
Wednesday, 12 October 1994	13:00	1st round
Thursday, 13 October 1994	13:00	Quarterfinals
Friday, 14 October 1994	13:00	Semifinals
Saturday, 15 October 1994	13:00	Final

== Results ==
1st round
Plernta Boonyarit (THA); Pornsawan Plungwech (THA)	6	3
Tokiko Hirota (JPN); Yuko Koike (JPN)	15	15
Eliza Nathanael (INA); Zelin Resiana (INA)	15	15
Ngan Fai (HKG); Cheng Yin Sat (HKG)	9	2
Tomomi Matsuo (JPN); Kyoko Sasage (JPN)	15	15
Wong Chun Fan (HKG); Tung Chau Man (HKG)	6	10
3/4	Tan Lee Wai (MAS); Lee Wai Leng (MAS)	15	15
Ruksita Sookboonmak (THA); Duchfun Eingsuwanpattama (THA)	8	6
Shim Eun-jung (KOR); Jang Hye-ock (KOR)	15	15
Wu Yuhong (CHN); Chen Ying (CHN)	5	10

Quarterfinals
1	Chung So-young (KOR); Gil Young-ah (KOR)	15	15
Tokiko Hirota (JPN); Yuko Koike (JPN)	7	6
3/4	Ge Fei (CHN); Gu Jun (CHN)	10	17	15
Eliza Nathanael (INA); Zelin Resiana (INA)	15	16	11
Tomomi Matsuo (JPN); Kyoko Sasage (JPN)	15	15
3/4	Tan Lee Wai (MAS); Lee Wai Leng (MAS)	11	5
Shim Eun-jung (KOR); Jang Hye-ock (KOR)	15	15
2	Finarsih (INA); Lili Tampi (INA)	7	0

Semifinals
1	Chung So-young (KOR); Gil Young-ah (KOR)	9	15	15
3/4	Ge Fei (CHN); Gu Jun (CHN)	15	7	10
Tomomi Matsuo (JPN); Kyoko Sasage (JPN)	2	5
Shim Eun-jung (KOR); Jang Hye-ock (KOR)	15	15

Finals
1	Chung So-young (KOR); Gil Young-ah (KOR)	9	3
Shim Eun-jung (KOR); Jang Hye-ock (KOR)	15	15
