= Badminton at the 1994 Asian Games – Mixed doubles =

Mixed doubles at the 1994 Asian Games
- Venue: Tsuru Memorial Gymnasium
- Dates: 11–15 October
- Competitors: 28 from 7 nations

Medalists
| gold medal | Yoo Yong-sung; Chung So-young | South Korea |
| silver medal | Kang Kyung-jin; Jang Hye-ock | South Korea |
| bronze medal | Yap Kim Hock; Lee Wai Leng | Malaysia |
| bronze medal | Rudy Gunawan; Eliza Nathanael | Indonesia |

The badminton mixed doubles tournament at the 1994 Asian Games in Hiroshima took place from 11 October to 15 October at Tsuru Memorial Gymnasium.

The South Korea duo of Yoo Yong-sung and Chung So-young won the gold in this tournament after beating another Korean pair of Kang Kyung-jin and Jang Hye-ock in the final.

Malaysia and Indonesia shared the bronze medal.

== Schedule ==
All times are Japan Standard Time (UTC+09:00)

| Date | Time | Event |
|---|---|---|
| Tuesday, 11 October 1994 | 13:00 | 1st round |
| Thursday, 13 October 1994 | 13:00 | Quarterfinals |
| Friday, 14 October 1994 | 13:00 | Semifinals |
| Saturday, 15 October 1994 | 13:00 | Final |

== Results ==
1st round
Bambang Suprianto (INA); Zelin Resiana (INA) | 15 | 10 | 7
Kang Kyung-jin (KOR); Jang Hye-ock (KOR) | 10 | 15 | 15
3/4 | Vacharapan Kumthong (THA); Sujitra Ekmongkolpaisarn (THA) | 6 | 5
Yap Kim Hock (MAS); Lee Wai Leng (MAS) | 15 | 15
Patrick Lau (SIN); Zarinah Abdullah (SIN) | 7 | 1
Shuji Matsuno (JPN); Tomomi Matsuo (JPN) | 15 | 15
Yoo Yong-sung (KOR); Chung So-young (KOR) | 17 | 15
Khunakorn Sudhisodhi (THA); Plernta Boonyarit (THA) | 14 | 1
Seiichi Watanabe (JPN); Yasuko Mizui (JPN) | 11 | 3
3/4 | Cheah Soon Kit (MAS); Tan Lee Wai (MAS) | 15 | 15
Rudy Gunawan (INA); Eliza Nathanael (INA) | 15 | 15
Chan Siu Kwong (HKG); Chung Hoi Yuk (HKG) | 9 | 9

Quarterfinals
1 | Liu Jianjun (CHN); Ge Fei (CHN) | 15 | 2 | 12
Kang Kyung-jin (KOR); Jang Hye-ock (KOR) | 10 | 15 | 15
Yap Kim Hock (MAS); Lee Wai Leng (MAS) | 15 | 15
Shuji Matsuno (JPN); Tomomi Matsuo (JPN) | 5 | 11
Yoo Yong-sung (KOR); Chung So-young (KOR) | 15 | 15
3/4 | Cheah Soon Kit (MAS); Tan Lee Wai (MAS) | 4 | 2
Rudy Gunawan (INA); Eliza Nathanael (INA) | 15 | 15
2 | Chen Xingdong (CHN); Gu Jun (CHN) | 12 | 12

Semifinals
Kang Kyung-jin (KOR); Jang Hye-ock (KOR) | 15 | 15
Yap Kim Hock (MAS); Lee Wai Leng (MAS) | 11 | 3
Yoo Yong-sung (KOR); Chung So-young (KOR) | 15 | 15
Rudy Gunawan (INA); Eliza Nathanael (INA) | 7 | 6

Finals
Kang Kyung-jin (KOR); Jang Hye-ock (KOR) | 10 | 12
Yoo Yong-sung (KOR); Chung So-young (KOR) | 15 | 15
