= Badminton at the 1994 Asian Games – Women's team =

Women's team at the 1994 Asian Games
- Venue: Tsuru Memorial Gymnasium
- Dates: 7–9 October
- Competitors: 44 from 6 nations

Medalists
gold medal	South Korea; Bang Soo-hyun, Chung So-young, Gil Young-ah, Jang Hye-ock, Kim Ji-hyun, Lee Heung-soon, Ra Kyung-min, Shim Eun-jung
silver medal	Indonesia; Finarsih, Yuni Kartika, Eliza Nathanael, Ika Heny Nursanti, Zelin Resiana, Yuliani Sentosa, Susi Susanti, Lili Tampi
bronze medal	Japan; Tokiko Hirota, Takako Ida, Yuko Koike, Tomomi Matsuo, Aiko Miyamura, Hisako Mizui, Yasuko Mizui, Kyoko Sasage
bronze medal	China; Chen Ying, Ge Fei, Gu Jun, Han Jingna, Tang Jiuhong, Wu Yuhong, Yao Yan, Ye Zhaoying

The Badminton women's team event at the 1994 Asian Games was scheduled from 7 to 9 October 1994 at Tsuru Memorial Gymnasium, Hiroshima.

== Schedule ==
All times are Japan Standard Time (UTC+09:00)

Date	Time	Event
Friday, 7 October 1994	13:00	Quarterfinals
Saturday, 8 October 1994	13:00	Semifinals
Sunday, 9 October 1994	13:00	Final

== Results ==
Quarterfinals			Semifinals			Final
			1	Indonesia	3
3/4	Japan	5	3/4	Japan	2
	Hong Kong	0				1	Indonesia	1
	Thailand	0				3/4	South Korea	4
3/4	South Korea	5	3/4	South Korea	5
			2	China	0

=== Quarterfinals ===
7 October	Japan	5–0	Hong Kong

7 October	Thailand	0–5	South Korea

=== Semifinals ===
8 October	Indonesia	3–2	Japan

Susi Susanti	2–0	Aiko Miyamura	11–3, 11–2
Yuni Kartika	0–2	Hisako Mizui	2–11, 7–11
Eliza Nathanael / Zelin Resiana	0–2	Tokiko Hirota / Yuko Koike	9–15, 12–15
Finarsih / Lili Tampi	2–0	Tomomi Matsuo / Kyoko Sasage	15–3, 15–8
Yuliani Sentosa	2–0	Takako Ida	11–3, 11–4

8 October	South Korea	5–0	China

Bang Soo-hyun	2–0	Ye Zhaoying	12–11, 12–10
Ra Kyung-min	2–0	Han Jingna	11–1, 12–10
Chung So-young / Gil Young-ah	2–0	Chen Ying / Wu Yuhong	15–9, 15–7
Jang Hye-ock / Shim Eun-jung	2–0	Ge Fei / Gu Jun
Lee Heung-soon	2–0	Tang Jiuhong	11–6, 11–3

=== Final ===
9 October	Indonesia	1–4	South Korea

Susi Susanti	2–0	Bang Soo-hyun	11–5, 11–2
Yuni Kartika	0–2	Ra Kyung-min	9–11, 8–11
Lili Tampi / Finarsih	0–2	Chung So-young / Jang Hye-ock	5–15, 11–15
Eliza Nathanael / Zelin Resiana	1–2	Gil Young-ah / Shim Eun-jung	15–12, 10–15, 11–15
Yuliani Sentosa	0–2	Lee Heung-soon	8–11, 5–11
