= Badminton at the 1996 Summer Olympics – Women's doubles =

Badminton at the Olympics

Women's doubles at the Games of the XXVI Olympiad
- Venue: Georgia State University Gymnasium
- Date: 25–31 July 1996
- Competitors: 27 pairs from 15 nations

Medalists
1st place, gold medalist(s)		Ge Fei; Gu Jun	China
2nd place, silver medalist(s)		Gil Young-ah; Jang Hye-ock	South Korea
3rd place, bronze medalist(s)		Qin Yiyuan; Tang Yongshu	China

Women’s doubles badminton event at the 1996 Summer Olympics was held from 25 to 31 July 1996. The tournament was single-elimination. Matches consisted of three sets, with sets being to 15 for women's doubles. The tournament was held at the Georgia State University Gymnasium.

== Seeds ==
1. (South Korea) Gil Young-ah / Jang Hye-ock (silver medalist)
2. (China) Ge Fei / Gu Jun (gold medalist)
3. (China) Qin Yiyuan / Tang Yongshu (bronze medalist)
4. (Denmark) Helene Kirkegaard / Rikke Olsen (fourth place)

== Results ==
=== Finals ===
Semifinals
1	(South Korea) Gil Young-ah (South Korea) Jang Hye-ock	15	10	18
3	(China) Qin Yiyuan (China) Tang Yongshu	12	15	16
4	(Denmark) Helene Kirkegaard (Denmark) Rikke Olsen	8	2
2	(China) Ge Fei (China) Gu Jun	15	15

Final
1	(South Korea) Gil Young-ah (South Korea) Jang Hye-ock	5	5
2	(China) Ge Fei (China) Gu Jun	15	15
Bronze medal match
3	(China) Qin Yiyuan (China) Tang Yongshu	7	15	15
4	(Denmark) Helene Kirkegaard (Denmark) Rikke Olsen	15	4	8

=== Top half ===
First round
1	(South Korea) Gil Young-ah (South Korea) Jang Hye-ock
bye
(Japan) Tomomi Matsuo (Japan) Masako Sakamoto	15	15
(Bulgaria) Diana Koleva (Bulgaria) Neli Nedjalkova	0	4
(United Kingdom) Julie Bradbury (United Kingdom) Joanne Wright
bye
(Denmark) Ann Jørgensen (Denmark) Lotte Olsen	15	15
(Russia) Elena Rybkhina (Russia) Marina Yakusheva	13	10
3	(China) Qin Yiyuan (China) Tang Yongshu
bye
(Indonesia) Lili Tampi (Indonesia) Finarsih	15	15
(Australia) Rhonda Cator (Australia) Amanda Hardy	9	4
(Denmark) Lisbet Stuer-Lauridsen (Denmark) Marlene Thomsen	15	15
(United States) Linda French (United States) Erika von Heiland	4	1
(South Korea) Chung Jae-hee (South Korea) Park Soo-yun	15	15
(Chinese Taipei) Chen Li-Chin (Chinese Taipei) Tsai Hui-Min	7	6

Second round
1	(South Korea) Gil Young-ah (South Korea) Jang Hye-ock	15	15
(Japan) Tomomi Matsuo (Japan) Masako Sakamoto	7	6
(United Kingdom) Julie Bradbury (United Kingdom) Joanne Wright	4	5
(Denmark) Ann Jørgensen (Denmark) Lotte Olsen	15	15
3	(China) Qin Yiyuan (China) Tang Yongshu	15	4	15
(Indonesia) Lili Tampi (Indonesia) Finarsih	1	15	6
(Denmark) Lisbet Stuer-Lauridsen (Denmark) Marlene Thomsen	15	13	15
(South Korea) Chung Jae-hee (South Korea) Park Soo-yun	8	15	9

Quarterfinals
1	(South Korea) Gil Young-ah (South Korea) Jang Hye-ock	15	15
(Denmark) Ann Jørgensen (Denmark) Lotte Olsen	9	9
3	(China) Qin Yiyuan (China) Tang Yongshu	15	15
(Denmark) Lisbet Stuer-Lauridsen (Denmark) Marlene Thomsen	8	3

Semifinals
1	(South Korea) Gil Young-ah (South Korea) Jang Hye-ock	15	10	18
3	(China) Qin Yiyuan (China) Tang Yongshu	12	15	16

=== Bottom half ===
First round
(United Kingdom) Kelly Morgan (United Kingdom) Joanne Muggeridge	10	5
(Netherlands) Eline Coene (Netherlands) Erica van den Heuvel	15	15
(Ukraine) Victoria Evtoushenko (Ukraine) Elena Nosdran	2	15	1
(China) Chen Ying (China) Peng Xingyong	15	11	15
(South Korea) Kim Shin-young (South Korea) Kim Mee-hyang	15	18
(Japan) Aiko Miyamura (Japan) Akiko Miyamura	12	13
bye
4	(Denmark) Helene Kirkegaard (Denmark) Rikke Olsen
(New Zealand) Tammy Jenkins (New Zealand) Rhona Robertson	15	15
(Canada) Si-An Deng (Canada) Denyse Julien	7	4
(Indonesia) Eliza Nathanael (Indonesia) Zelin Resiana	15	15
(Sweden) Maria Bengtsson (Sweden) Margit Borg	6	13
(Germany) Katrin Schmidt (Germany) Kerstin Ubben	15	15
(Mauritius) Martine de Souza (Mauritius) Marie-Josephe Jean-Pierre	1	2
bye
2	(China) Ge Fei (China) Gu Jun

Second round
(Netherlands) Eline Coene (Netherlands) Erica van den Heuvel	8	3
(China) Chen Ying (China) Peng Xingyong	15	15
(South Korea) Kim Shin-young (South Korea) Kim Mee-hyang	8	8
4	(Denmark) Helene Kirkegaard (Denmark) Rikke Olsen	15	15
(New Zealand) Tammy Jenkins (New Zealand) Rhona Robertson	9	2
(Indonesia) Eliza Nathanael (Indonesia) Zelin Resiana	15	15
(Germany) Katrin Schmidt (Germany) Kerstin Ubben	3	6
2	(China) Ge Fei (China) Gu Jun	15	15

Quarterfinals
(China) Chen Ying (China) Peng Xingyong	6	15	5
4	(Denmark) Helene Kirkegaard (Denmark) Rikke Olsen	15	8	15
(Indonesia) Eliza Nathanael (Indonesia) Zelin Resiana	7	3
2	(China) Ge Fei (China) Gu Jun	15	15

Semifinals
4	(Denmark) Helene Kirkegaard (Denmark) Rikke Olsen	8	2
2	(China) Ge Fei (China) Gu Jun	15	15

== Sources ==
- Badminton at the 1996 Atlanta Summer Games: Women's Doubles
- The Official Report of the Centennial Olympic Games Volume Three ˗ The Competition Results (PDF). p. 113. Archived from the original (PDF) on 27 September 2007.
