= 1994 Badminton World Cup =

Badminton championships

Tournament details
- Edition: 16th
- Total prize money: US$170,000
- Venue: Phan Đình Phùng Indoor stadium
- Location: Ho Chi Minh City, Vietnam

The 1994 Badminton World Cup was the sixteenth edition of an international tournament Badminton World Cup. The event was held in Ho Chi Minh City, Vietnam in 1994 with a total prize money of US$170,000. Indonesia won both the singles event with women's doubles while Malaysia won Men's doubles and cross country pair from Denmark & Sweden won the mixed doubles.

== Medalists ==
Event	Gold	Silver	Bronze
Men's singles	(Indonesia) Heryanto Arbi	(Denmark) Thomas Stuer-Lauridsen	(Indonesia) Ardy Wiranata
Men's singles	(Indonesia) Heryanto Arbi	(Denmark) Thomas Stuer-Lauridsen	(Indonesia) Joko Suprianto
Women's singles	(Indonesia) Susi Susanti	(South Korea) Bang Soo-hyun	(Denmark) Camilla Martin
Women's singles	(Indonesia) Susi Susanti	(South Korea) Bang Soo-hyun	(China) Ye Zhaoying
Men's doubles	(Malaysia) Cheah Soon Kit (Malaysia) Soo Beng Kiang	(Indonesia) Rudy Gunawan (Indonesia) Bambang Suprianto	(Malaysia) Yap Kim Hock (Malaysia) Tan Kim Her
Men's doubles	(Malaysia) Cheah Soon Kit (Malaysia) Soo Beng Kiang	(Indonesia) Rudy Gunawan (Indonesia) Bambang Suprianto	(Denmark) Thomas Lund (Denmark) Michael Søgaard
Women's doubles	(Indonesia) Lili Tampi (Indonesia) Finarsih	(South Korea) Chung So-young (South Korea) Gil Young-ah	(Denmark) Lotte Olsen (Denmark) Lisbet Stuer-Lauridsen
Women's doubles	(Indonesia) Lili Tampi (Indonesia) Finarsih	(South Korea) Chung So-young (South Korea) Gil Young-ah	(China) Wu Yuhong (China) Chen Ying
Mixed doubles	(Denmark) Thomas Lund (Sweden) Catrine Bengtsson	(China) Chen Xingdong (China) Gu Jun	(Sweden) Jan-Eric Antonsson (Sweden) Astrid Crabo
Mixed doubles	(Denmark) Thomas Lund (Sweden) Catrine Bengtsson	(China) Chen Xingdong (China) Gu Jun	(Indonesia) Aryono Miranat (Indonesia) Rosalina Riseu

== Men's singles ==
=== Finals ===
Semi-finals
(Indonesia) Heryanto Arbi	15	15
(Indonesia) Ardy Wiranata	10	11
(Indonesia) Joko Suprianto	15	12	6
(Denmark) Thomas Stuer-Lauridsen	9	15	15

Final
(Indonesia) Heryanto Arbi	9
(Denmark) Thomas Stuer-Lauridsen	7^{r}

== Women's singles ==
=== Finals ===
Semi-finals
(Indonesia) Susi Susanti	12	11
(Denmark) Camilla Martin	10	1
(China) Ye Zhaoying	2	4
(South Korea) Bang Soo-hyun	11	11

Final
(Indonesia) Susi Susanti	12	11
(South Korea) Bang Soo-hyun	9	6

== Men's doubles ==
=== Finals ===
Semi-finals
(Indonesia) Rudy Gunawan (Indonesia) Bambang Suprianto	15	15
(Denmark) Thomas Lund (Denmark) Michael Søgaard	2	10
(Malaysia) Cheah Soon Kit (Malaysia) Soo Beng Kiang	6	15	15
(Malaysia) Yap Kim Hock (Malaysia) Tan Kim Her	15	11	8

Final
(Indonesia) Rudy Gunawan (Indonesia) Bambang Suprianto	13	15	16
(Malaysia) Cheah Soon Kit (Malaysia) Soo Beng Kiang	18	2	17

== Women's doubles ==
=== Finals ===
Semi-finals
(Indonesia) Lili Tampi (Indonesia) Finarsih	15	15
(Denmark) Lotte Olsen (Denmark) Lisbet Stuer-Lauridsen	3	5
(China) Wu Yuhong (China) Chen Ying	10	7
(South Korea) Chung So-young (South Korea) Gil Young-ah	15	15

Final
(Indonesia) Lili Tampi (Indonesia) Finarsih	15	15
(South Korea) Chung So-young (South Korea) Gil Young-ah	11	12

== Mixed doubles ==
=== Finals ===
Semi-finals
(Indonesia) Aryono Miranat (Indonesia) Rosalina Riseu	10	6
(China) Gu Jun (China) Chen Xingdong	15	15
(Denmark) Thomas Lund (Sweden) Catrine Bengtsson	18	15
(Sweden) Jan-Eric Antonsson (Sweden) Astrid Crabo	16	12

Final
(China) Gu Jun (China) Chen Xingdong	15	10	2
(Denmark) Thomas Lund (Sweden) Catrine Bengtsson	10	15	15
