= Gil Young-ah =

South Korean badminton player

Personal information
- Born: 11 April 1970 (age 56) Ansan, South Korea

Sport
- Country: South Korea
- Sport: Badminton
Medal record
Women's badminton
Representing South Korea
Olympic Games
Gold medal – first place	1996 Atlanta	Mixed doubles
Silver medal – second place	1996 Atlanta	Women's doubles
Bronze medal – third place	1992 Barcelona	Women's doubles
World Championships
Gold medal – first place	1995 Lausanne	Women's doubles
Bronze medal – third place	1991 Copenhagen	Women's doubles
Bronze medal – third place	1993 Birmingham	Women's doubles
World Cup
Silver medal – second place	1993 New Delhi	Women's doubles
Silver medal – second place	1994 Ho Chi Minh	Women's doubles
Sudirman Cup
Gold medal – first place	1993 Birmingham	Mixed team
Bronze medal – third place	1995 Lausanne	Mixed team
Uber Cup
Silver medal – second place	1990 Nagoya & Tokyo	Women's team
Silver medal – second place	1992 Kuala Lumpur	Women's team
Bronze medal – third place	1994 Jakarta	Women's team
Bronze medal – third place	1996 Hong Kong	Women's team
Asian Games
Gold medal – first place	1994 Hiroshima	Women's team
Silver medal – second place	1990 Beijing	Women's doubles
Silver medal – second place	1994 Hiroshima	Women's doubles
Bronze medal – third place	1990 Beijing	Women's team
Asian Championships
Silver medal – second place	1991 Kuala Lumpur	Women's doubles
Asian Cup
Gold medal – first place	1991 Jakarta	Mixed doubles
Silver medal – second place	1995 Qingdao	Women's doubles
Silver medal – second place	1995 Qingdao	Mixed doubles

- Korean name
- Hangul: 길영아
- Hanja: 吉永雅
- RR: Gil Yeonga
- MR: Kil Yŏnga

Gil Young-ah (Korean: 길영아; born 11 April 1970) is a South Korean badminton player. She was born in Ansan. Gil has two children who are active elite badminton players. Her daughter Kim Ah-young plays for an elite high school team in Gyeonggi-do and Her son Kim Won-ho is an olympic silver medalist.

At the 1992 Summer Olympics in Barcelona, she won the bronze medal in the women's doubles together with Shim Eun-jung.

Four years later, at the Atlanta Olympics, she won the gold medal in the mixed doubles together with Kim Dong-moon and the silver medal in the women's doubles together with Jang Hye-ock.

Gil retired from badminton after the 1996 Olympics and became an assistant coach of the Samsung Electro-Mechanics badminton team. In 2011, Gil became the first woman to be appointed head coach of a professional team in Korea. She was made Head Coach of the Samsung Electromechanics Women's Badminton Team. When Kim Moon-soo vacated his post as head of the men's team in late 2015, Gil was made Head Coach of the combined team.

== Achievements ==
=== Olympic Games ===
Women's doubles
Year	Venue	Partner	Opponent	Score	Result
1992	Pavelló de la Mar Bella, Barcelona, Spain	(South Korea) Shim Eun-jung	(China) Guan Weizhen (China) Nong Qunhua	12–15, 15–2, 8–15	Bronze
1996	GSU Sports Arena, Atlanta, United States	(South Korea) Jang Hye-ock	(China) Ge Fei (China) Gu Jun	5–15, 5–15	Silver

Mixed doubles
Year	Venue	Partner	Opponent	Score	Result
1996	GSU Sports Arena, Atlanta, United States	(South Korea) Kim Dong-moon	(South Korea) Park Joo-bong (South Korea) Ra Kyung-min	13–15, 15–4, 15–12	Gold

=== World Championships ===
Women's doubles
Year	Venue	Partner	Opponent	Score	Result
1991	Brøndby Arena, Copenhagen, Denmark	(South Korea) Shim Eun-jung	(Sweden) Maria Bengtsson (Sweden) Christine Magnusson	15–8, 8–15, 5–15	Bronze
1993	National Indoor Arena, Birmingham, England	(South Korea) Chung So-young	(China) Chen Ying (China) Wu Yuhong	7–15, 15–6, 11–15	Bronze
1995	Malley Sports Centre, Lausanne, Switzerland	(South Korea) Jang Hye-ock	(Indonesia) Finarsih (Indonesia) Lili Tampi	3–15, 15–11, 15–10	Gold

=== World Cup ===
Women's doubles
Year	Venue	Partner	Opponent	Score	Result
1993	Indira Gandhi Arena, New Delhi, India	(South Korea) Chung So-young	(Sweden) Lim Xiaoqing (Sweden) Christine Magnusson	12–15, 9–15	Silver
1994	Phan Đình Phùng Indoor Stadium; Ho Chi Minh, Vietnam	(South Korea) Chung So-young	(Indonesia) Finarsih (Indonesia) Lili Tampi	11–15, 12–15	Silver

=== Asian Games ===
Women's doubles
Year	Venue	Partner	Opponent	Score	Result
1990	Beijing Gymnasium, Beijing, China	(South Korea) Chung So-young	(China) Guan Weizhen (China) Nong Qunhua	11–15, 4–15	Silver
1994	Tsuru Memorial Gymnasium, Hiroshima, Japan	(South Korea) Chung So-young	(South Korea) Jang Hye-ock (South Korea) Shim Eun-jung	9–15, 3–15	Silver

=== Asian Championships ===
Women's doubles
Year	Venue	Partner	Opponent	Score	Result
1991	Cheras Indoor Stadium, Kuala Lumpur, Malaysia	(South Korea) Shim Eun-Jung	(South Korea) Chung So-young (South Korea) Hwang Hye-young	2–15, 18–13, 4–15	Silver

=== Asian Cup ===
Women's doubles
Year	Venue	Partner	Opponent	Score	Result
1995	Xinxing Gymnasium, Qingdao, China	(South Korea) Jang Hye-ock	(China) Ge Fei (China) Gu Jun	7–15, 17–18	Silver

Mixed doubles
Year	Venue	Partner	Opponent	Score	Result
1991	Istora Senayan, Jakarta, Indonesia	(South Korea) Shon Jin-hwan	(Indonesia) Aryono Miranat (Indonesia) Eliza Nathanael	15–5, 8–15, 15–7	Gold
1995	Xinxing Gymnasium, Qingdao, China	(South Korea) Kim Dong-moon	(China) Liu Jianjun (China) Sun Man	11–15, 15–7, 10–15	Silver

=== IBF World Grand Prix (24 titles, 16 runners-up) ===
The World Badminton Grand Prix sanctioned by International Badminton Federation (IBF) from 1983 to 2006.

Women doubles
Year	Tournament	Partner	Opponent	Score	Result
1991	Indonesia Open	(South Korea) Chung So-young	(South Korea) Chung Myung-hee (South Korea) Hwang Hye-young	18–14, 10–15, 9–15	(silver) Runner-up
1991	Thailand Open	(South Korea) Hwang Hye-young	(Netherlands) Eline Coene (Netherlands) Erica van den Heuvel	15–10, 15–6	(gold) Winner
1991	Hong Kong Open	(South Korea) Hwang Hye-young	(South Korea) Chung Myung-hee (South Korea) Shim Eun-jung	15–10, 15–4	(gold) Winner
1992	Chinese Taipei Open	(South Korea) Shim Eun-jung	(Netherlands) Eline Coene (Netherlands) Erica van den Heuvel	15–7, 15–4	(gold) Winner
1992	Japan Open	(South Korea) Shim Eun-jung	(South Korea) Chung So-young (South Korea) Hwang Hye-young	5–15, 10–15	(silver) Runner-up
1992	Korea Open	(South Korea) Shim Eun-jung	(South Korea) Chung So-young (South Korea) Hwang Hye-young	6–15, 7–15	(silver) Runner-up
1992	Malaysia Open	(South Korea) Park Soo-yun	(Sweden) Lim Xiaoqing (Sweden) Christine Magnusson	7–15, 9–15	(silver) Runner-up
1993	Japan Open	(South Korea) Chung So-young	(Indonesia) Finarsih (Indonesia) Lili Tampi	15–12, 15–5	(gold) Winner
1993	Korea Open	(South Korea) Chung So-young	(China) Lin Yanfen (China) Yao Fen	15–8, 15–5	(gold) Winner
1993	Swedish Open	(South Korea) Chung So-young	(Sweden) Lim Xiaoqing (Sweden) Christine Magnusson	15–9, 15–11	(gold) Winner
1993	All England Open	(South Korea) Chung So-young	(China) Lin Yanfen (China) Yao Fen	5–15, 15–4, 15–7	(gold) Winner
1993	U.S. Open	(South Korea) Chung So-young	(Sweden) Lim Xiaoqing (Sweden) Christine Magnusson	15–5, 15–4	(gold) Winner
1994	Japan Open	(South Korea) Chung So-young	(Indonesia) Finarsih (Indonesia) Lili Tampi	15–11, 15–11	(gold) Winner
1994	Korea Open	(South Korea) Chung So-young	(China) Chen Ying (China) Wu Yuhong	15–8, 15–12	(gold) Winner
1994	Swedish Open	(South Korea) Chung So-young	(South Korea) Jang Hye-ock (South Korea) Shim Eun-jung	15–9, 15–11	(gold) Winner
1994	All England Open	(South Korea) Chung So-young	(South Korea) Jang Hye-ock (South Korea) Shim Eun-jung	7–15, 15–8, 15–4	(gold) Winner
1994	Singapore Open	(South Korea) Kim Mee-hyang	(China) Ge Fei (China) Gu Jun	7–15, 16–18	(silver) Runner-up
1994	Indonesia Open	(South Korea) Chung So-young	(Indonesia) Finarsih (Indonesia) Lili Tampi	10–15, 15–9, 15–17	(silver) Runner-up
1995	Korea Open	(South Korea) Jang Hye-ock	(China) Ge Fei (China) Gu Jun	15–13, 1–15, 15–11	(gold) Winner
1995	All England Open	(South Korea) Jang Hye-ock	(Indonesia) Eliza Nathanael (Indonesia) Zelin Resiana	15–6, 15–3	(gold) Winner
1995	Malaysia Open	(South Korea) Jang Hye-ock	(England) Julie Bradbury (England) Joanne Wright	10–15, 11–15	(silver) Runner-up
1995	Singapore Open	(South Korea) Jang Hye-ock	(China) Ge Fei (China) Gu Jun	12–15, 7–15	(silver) Runner-up
1995	U.S. Open	(South Korea) Jang Hye-ock	(South Korea) Kim Mee-hyang (South Korea) Kim Shin-young	15–9, 15–4	(gold) Winner
1995	Canadian Open	(South Korea) Jang Hye-ock	(China) Qin Yiyuan (China) Tang Yongshu	15–10, 15–4	(gold) Winner
1995	Hong Kong Open	(South Korea) Jang Hye-ock	(England) Julie Bradbury (England) Joanne Wright	17–15, 15–5	(gold) Winner
1995	China Open	(South Korea) Jang Hye-ock	(China) Ge Fei (China) Gu Jun	12–15, 15–10, 3–15	(silver) Runner-up
1995	Thailand Open	(South Korea) Jang Hye-ock	(China) Ge Fei (China) Gu Jun	18–17, 15–6	(gold) Winner
1995	World Grand Prix Finals	(South Korea) Jang Hye-ock	(China) Ge Fei (China) Gu Jun	7–15, 12–15	(silver) Runner-up
1996	Japan Open	(South Korea) Jang Hye-ock	(China) Ge Fei (China) Gu Jun	15–5, 14–17, 15–10	(gold) Winner
1996	Korea Open	(South Korea) Jang Hye-ock	(South Korea) Kim Mee-hyang (South Korea) Kim Shin-young	11–15, 15–11, 15–4	(gold) Winner

Mixed doubles
Year	Tournament	Partner	Opponent	Score	Result
1991	Hong Kong Open	(South Korea) Shon Jin-hwan	(South Korea) Lee Sang-bok (South Korea) Shim Eun-jung	15–17, 1–15	(silver) Runner-up
1991	World Grand Prix Finals	(South Korea) Shon Jin-hwan	(Denmark) Thomas Lund (Denmark) Pernille Dupont	15–11, 7–15, 9–15	(silver) Runner-up
1992	Singapore Open	(South Korea) Lee Sang-bok	(Sweden) Pär-Gunnar Jönsson (Sweden) Maria Bengtsson	3–15, 10–15	(silver) Runner-up
1992	Hong Kong Open	(South Korea) Lee Sang-bok	(Indonesia) Aryono Miranat (Indonesia) Eliza Nathanael	15–4, 15–11	(gold) Winner
1995	Swedish Open	(South Korea) Kim Dong-moon	(China) Chen Xingdong (China) Wang Xiaoyuan	13–18, 15–5, 9–15	(silver) Runner-up
1995	Malaysia Open	(South Korea) Kim Dong-moon	(China) Tao Xiaoqiang (China) Wang Xiaoyuan	15–7, 15–9	(gold) Winner
1995	Singapore Open	(South Korea) Kim Dong-moon	(Indonesia) Tri Kusharjanto (Indonesia) Minarti Timur	12–15, 15–9, 10–15	(silver) Runner-up
1995	U.S. Open	(South Korea) Kim Dong-moon	(Indonesia) Tri Kusharjanto (Indonesia) Minarti Timur	15–5, 10–15, 15–13	(gold) Winner
1995	Canada Open	(South Korea) Kim Dong-moon	(South Korea) Kang Kyung-jin (South Korea) Kim Mee-hyang	15–7, 15–8	(gold) Winner
1996	Japan Open	(South Korea) Kim Dong-moon	(South Korea) Park Joo-bong (South Korea) Ra Kyung-min	7–15, 1–15	(silver) Runner-up
