= Chung So-young =

South Korean badminton player (born 1967)

Personal information
- Born: 20 February 1967 (age 59) Gimje-si, Jeollabuk-do, South Korea
- Height: 1.64 m (5 ft 5 in)
- Weight: 64 kg (141 lb)

Sport
- Country: South Korea
- Sport: Badminton
- Event: Women's & mixed doubles

Women's & mixed doubles
- BWF profile
Medal record
Women's badminton
Representing South Korea
Olympic Games
Gold medal – first place	1992 Barcelona	Women's doubles
World Championships
Bronze medal – third place	1987 Beijing	Women's doubles
Bronze medal – third place	1991 Copenhagen	Women's doubles
Bronze medal – third place	1993 Birmingham	Women's doubles
World Cup
Gold medal – first place	1991 Macau	Women's doubles
Silver medal – second place	1988 Bangkok	Women's doubles
Silver medal – second place	1989 Guangzhou	Women's doubles
Silver medal – second place	1989 Guangzhou	Mixed doubles
Silver medal – second place	1993 New Delhi	Women's doubles
Silver medal – second place	1994 Ho Chi Minh	Women's doubles
Bronze medal – third place	1990 Jakarta	Women's doubles
Sudirman Cup
Gold medal – first place	1991 Copenhagen	Mixed team
Gold medal – first place	1993 Birmingham	Mixed team
Silver medal – second place	1989 Jakarta	Mixed team
Uber Cup
Silver medal – second place	1988 Kuala Lumpur	Women's team
Silver medal – second place	1990 Nagoya–Tokyo	Women's team
Silver medal – second place	1992 Kuala Lumpur	Women's team
Asian Games
Gold medal – first place	1994 Hiroshima	Mixed doubles
Gold medal – first place	1994 Hiroshima	Women's team
Silver medal – second place	1986 Seoul	Mixed doubles
Silver medal – second place	1990 Beijing	Women's doubles
Silver medal – second place	1994 Hiroshima	Women's doubles
Bronze medal – third place	1986 Seoul	Women's team
Bronze medal – third place	1990 Beijing	Women's team
Asian Championships
Gold medal – first place	1991 Kuala Lumpur	Women's doubles
Silver medal – second place	1985 Kuala Lumpur	Women's doubles
Silver medal – second place	1991 Kuala Lumpur	Mixed doubles
Asian Cup
Gold medal – first place	1991 Jakarta	Women's doubles
Gold medal – first place	1994 Beijing	Women's doubles
Gold medal – first place	1996 Seoul	Women's doubles

- Chung So-young
- Hangul: 정소영
- Hanja: 鄭素英
- RR: Jeong Soyeong
- MR: Chŏng Soyŏng

Chung So-young (Korean: 정소영; Hanja: 鄭素英; born 20 February 1967) is a South Korean badminton player. She was a gold medalist at the Barcelona Olympics in 1992 in the women's doubles together with Hwang Hye-young, and was inducted into the Badminton Hall of Fame in 2003.

== Career ==
Chung started to representing South Korea in the international tournament in November 1984.

She won a bronze medal at the 1987 World Championships in the women's doubles with Kim Yun-ja.

Partnered with Gil Young-ah, the duo ranked as world number 1 in 1993.

== Personal life ==
Chung graduated from Gunsan Girls' High School and later in Jeonbuk National University. She married Kim Bum-shik, also a former South Korean badminton player and now works as coach in Masan. Chung and Kim have three daughters, among them, their first child, Kim Hye-jeong, is a member of South Korea national team.

== Achievements ==
=== Olympic Games ===
Women's doubles
Year	Venue	Partner	Opponent	Score	Result
1988 (Exhibition)	Seoul National University Gymnasium, Seoul, South Korea	(South Korea) Kim Yun-ja	(China) Guan Weizhen (China) Lin Ying	15–11, 14–17, 15–5	Gold
1992	Pavelló de la Mar Bella, Barcelona, Spain	(South Korea) Hwang Hye-young	(China) Guan Weizhen (China) Nong Qunhua	18–16, 12–15, 15–13	Gold

=== World Championships ===
Women's doubles
Year	Venue	Partner	Opponent	Score	Result
1987	Capital Indoor Stadium, Beijing, China	(South Korea) Kim Yun-ja	(China) Guan Weizhen (China) Lin Ying	15–12, 12–15, 4–15	Bronze
1991	Brøndby Arena, Copenhagen, Denmark	(South Korea) Hwang Hye-young	(China) Guan Weizhen (China) Nong Qunhua	7–15, 8–15	Bronze
1993	National Indoor Arena, Birmingham, England	(South Korea) Gil Young-ah	(China) Chen Ying (China) Wu Yuhong	7–15, 15–6, 11–15	Bronze

=== World Cup ===
Women's doubles
Year	Venue	Partner	Opponent	Score	Result
1988	National Stadium, Bangkok, Thailand	(South Korea) Kim Yun-ja	(China) Guan Weizhen (China) Lin Ying	3–15, 7–15	Silver
1989	Guangzhou Gymnasium, Guangzhou, China	(South Korea) Hwang Hye-young	(China) Guan Weizhen (China) Lin Ying	2–15, 15–17	Silver
1990	Istora Senayan, Jakarta, Indonesia	(South Korea) Hwang Hye-young	(China) Lai Caiqin (China) Yao Fen	15–12, 7–15, 10–15	Bronze
1991	Macau Forum, Macau	(South Korea) Hwang Hye-young	(Indonesia) Erma Sulistianingsih (Indonesia) Rosiana Tendean	15–3, 15–3	Gold
1993	Indira Gandhi Arena, New Delhi, India	(South Korea) Gil Young-ah	(Sweden) Lim Xiaoqing (Sweden) Christine Magnusson	12–15, 9–15	Silver
1994	Phan Đình Phùng Indoor Stadium, Ho Chi Minh, Vietnam	(South Korea) Gil Young-ah	(Indonesia) Finarsih (Indonesia) Lili Tampi	11–15, 12–15	Silver

Mixed doubles
Year	Venue	Partner	Opponent	Score	Result
1989	Guangzhou Gymnasium, Guangzhou, China	(South Korea) Kim Moon-soo	(South Korea) Park Joo-bong (South Korea) Chung Myung-hee	5–15, 9–15	Silver

=== Asian Games ===
Women's doubles
Year	Venue	Partner	Opponent	Score	Result
1990	Beijing Gymnasium, Beijing, China	(South Korea) Gil Young-ah	(China) Guan Weizhen (China) Nong Qunhua	11–15, 4–15	Silver
1994	Tsuru Memorial Gymnasium, Hiroshima, Japan	(South Korea) Gil Young-ah	(South Korea) Jang Hye-ock (South Korea) Shim Eun-jung	9–15, 3–15	Silver

Mixed doubles
Year	Venue	Partner	Opponent	Score	Result
1986	Olympic Gymnastics Arena, Seoul, South Korea	(South Korea) Lee Deuk-choon	(South Korea) Park Joo-bong (South Korea) Chung Myung-hee	10–15, 3–15	Silver
1994	Tsuru Memorial Gymnasium, Hiroshima, Japan	(South Korea) Yoo Yong-sung	(South Korea) Kang Kyung-jin (South Korea) Jang Hye-ock	15–10, 15–12	Gold

=== Asian Championships ===
Women's doubles
Year	Venue	Partner	Opponent	Score	Result
1985	Stadium Negara, Kuala Lumpur, Malaysia	(South Korea) Hwang Hye-young	(South Korea) Kim Yun-ja (South Korea) Yoo Sang-hee	5–15, 4–15	Silver
1991	Cheras Indoor Stadium, Kuala Lumpur, Malaysia	(South Korea) Hwang Hye-young	(South Korea) Gil Young-ah (South Korea) Shim Eun-jung	15–2, 13–18, 15–4	Gold

Mixed doubles
Year	Venue	Partner	Opponent	Score	Result
1991	Cheras Indoor Stadium, Kuala Lumpur, Malaysia	(South Korea) Lee Sang-bok	(South Korea) Park Joo-bong (South Korea) Chung Myung-hee	7–15, 4–15	Silver

=== Asian Cup ===
Women's doubles
Year	Venue	Partner	Opponent	Score	Result
1991	Istora Senayan, Jakarta, Indonesia	(South Korea) Hwang Hye-young	(Japan) Kimiko Jinnai (Japan) Hisako Mori	15–13, 15–1	Gold
1994	Beijing Gymnasium, Beijing, China	(South Korea) Jang Hye-ock	(China) Chen Ying (China) Wu Yuhong	15–9, 15–5	Gold
1996	Olympic Gymnasium No. 2, Seoul, South Korea	(South Korea) Jang Hye-ock	(Indonesia) Indarti Issolina (Indonesia) Deyana Lomban	15–7, 15–8	Gold

=== IBF World Grand Prix (33 titles, 17 runners-up) ===
The World Badminton Grand Prix sanctioned by International Badminton Federation (IBF) from 1983 to 2006.

Women's doubles
Year	Tournament	Partner	Opponent	Score	Result
1986	Scandinavian Open	(South Korea) Chung Myung-hee	(South Korea) Kim Yun-ja (South Korea) Yoo Sang-hee	7–15, 14–17	(silver) Runner-up
1987	French Open	(South Korea) Kim Ho-ja	(South Korea) Chung Myung-hee (South Korea) Hwang Hye-young	15–4, 9–15, 7–15	(silver) Runner-up
1987	Hong Kong Open	(South Korea) Kim Yun-ja	(Indonesia) Ivanna Lie (Indonesia) Rosiana Tendean	18–14, 11–15, 15–2	(gold) Winner
1987	Canadian Open	(South Korea) Kim Ho-ja	(South Korea) Cho Young-suk (South Korea) Kim Jung-ja	15–7, 10–15, 5–15	(silver) Runner-up
1988	Japan Open	(South Korea) Chung Myung-hee	(England) Gillian Clark (England) Gillian Gowers	15–2, 7–15, 15–6	(gold) Winner
1988	All England Open	(South Korea) Kim Yun-ja	(South Korea) Chung Myung-hee (South Korea) Hwang Hye-young	15–8, 9–15 retired	(gold) Winner
1988	French Open	(South Korea) Kim Yun-ja	(South Korea) Chung Myung-hee (South Korea) Hwang Hye-young	9–15, 13–18	(silver) Runner-up
1988	Canadian Open	(South Korea) Kim Yun-ja	(Netherlands) Eline Coene (Netherlands) Erica van Dijck	4–15, 3–15	(silver) Runner-up
1988	U.S. Open	(South Korea) Kim Yun-ja	(South Korea) Cho Young-suk (South Korea) Lee Myung-hee	17–14, 15–4	(gold) Winner
1988	Malaysia Open	(South Korea) Kim Yun-ja	(China) Guan Weizhen (China) Lin Ying	6–15, 3–15	(silver) Runner-up
1989	Japan Open	(South Korea) Chung Myung-hee	(England) Gillian Clark (England) Julie Munday	4–15, 15–10, 3–15	(silver) Runner-up
1989	Swedish Open	(South Korea) Chung Myung-hee	(South Korea) Hwang Hye-young (South Korea) Lee Young-suk	15–3, 15–5	(gold) Winner
1989	All England Open	(South Korea) Chung Myung-hee	(China) Sun Xiaoqing (China) Zhou Lei	15–7, 15–4	(gold) Winner
1989	Malaysia Open	(South Korea) Hwang Hye-young	(China) Guan Weizhen (China) Lin Ying	4–15, 4–15	(silver) Runner-up
1989	Thailand Open	(South Korea) Hwang Hye-young	(China) Guan Weizhen (China) Lin Ying	15–5, 17–18, 9–15	(silver) Runner-up
1989	Hong Kong Open	(South Korea) Hwang Hye-young	(China) Guan Weizhen (China) Lin Ying	4–15, 9–15	(silver) Runner-up
1990	Thailand Open	(South Korea) Chung Myung-hee	(China) Lai Caiqin (China) Yao Fen	11–15, 15–10, 12–15	(silver) Runner-up
1990	Malaysia Open	(South Korea) Chung Myung-hee	(China) Lai Caiqin (China) Yao Fen	7–15, 15–9, 15–9	(gold) Winner
1990	Indonesia Open	(South Korea) Chung Myung-hee	(Indonesia) Erma Sulistianingsih (Indonesia) Rosiana Tendean	17–15, 8–15, 15–3	(gold) Winner
1991	Korea Open	(South Korea) Hwang Hye-young	(South Korea) Gil Young-ah (South Korea) Shim Eun-jung	17–16, 17–14	(gold) Winner
1991	All England Open	(South Korea) Hwang Hye-young	(Japan) Kimiko Jinnai (Japan) Hisako Mori	15–5, 15–3	(gold) Winner
1991	Malaysia Open	(South Korea) Hwang Hye-young	(England) Gillian Clark (Denmark) Nettie Nielsen	15–10, 15–11	(gold) Winner
1991	Indonesia Open	(South Korea) Gil Young-ah	(South Korea) Chung Myung-hee (South Korea) Hwang Hye-young	18–14, 10–15, 9–15	(silver) Runner-up
1991	Singapore Open	(South Korea) Chung Myung-hee	(Sweden) Lim Xiaoqing (Sweden) Christine Magnusson	15–11, 15–3	(gold) Winner
1991	World Grand Prix Finals	(South Korea) Hwang Hye-young	(Indonesia) Erma Sulistianingsih (Indonesia) Rosiana Tendean	18–15, 15–3	(gold) Winner
1992	Japan Open	(South Korea) Hwang Hye-young	(South Korea) Gil Young-ah (South Korea) Shim Eun-jung	15–5, 15–10	(gold) Winner
1992	Korea Open	(South Korea) Hwang Hye-young	(South Korea) Gil Young-ah (South Korea) Shim Eun-jung	15–6, 15–7	(gold) Winner
1993	Japan Open	(South Korea) Gil Young-ah	(Indonesia) Finarsih (Indonesia) Lili Tampi	15–12, 15–5	(gold) Winner
1993	Korea Open	(South Korea) Gil Young-ah	(China) Lin Yanfen (China) Yao Fen	15–8, 15–5	(gold) Winner
1993	Swedish Open	(South Korea) Gil Young-ah	(Sweden) Lim Xiaoqing (Sweden) Christine Magnusson	15–9, 15–11	(gold) Winner
1993	All England Open	(South Korea) Gil Young-ah	(China) Lin Yanfen (China) Yao Fen	5–15, 15–4, 15–7	(gold) Winner
1993	U.S. Open	(South Korea) Gil Young-ah	(Sweden) Lim Xiaoqing (Sweden) Christine Magnusson	15–5, 15–4	(gold) Winner
1994	Japan Open	(South Korea) Gil Young-ah	(Indonesia) Finarsih (Indonesia) Lili Tampi	15–11, 15–11	(gold) Winner
1994	Korea Open	(South Korea) Gil Young-ah	(China) Chen Ying (China) Wu Yuhong	15–8, 15–12	(gold) Winner
1994	Swedish Open	(South Korea) Gil Young-ah	(South Korea) Jang Hye-ock (South Korea) Shim Eun-jung	15–9, 15–11	(gold) Winner
1994	All England Open	(South Korea) Gil Young-ah	(South Korea) Jang Hye-ock (South Korea) Shim Eun-jung	7–15, 15–8, 15–4	(gold) Winner
1994	Indonesia Open	(South Korea) Gil Young-ah	(Indonesia) Finarsih (Indonesia) Lili Tampi	10–15, 15–9, 15–17	(silver) Runner-up

Mixed doubles
Year	Tournament	Partner	Opponent	Score	Result
1986	All England Open	(South Korea) Lee Deuk-choon	(South Korea) Park Joo-bong (South Korea) Chung Myung-hee	5–15, 5–15	(silver) Runner-up
1987	Canadian Open	(South Korea) Lee Deuk-choon	(England) Andy Goode (England) Gillian Gowers	15–3, 11–15, 5–15	(silver) Runner-up
1988	Japan Open	(South Korea) Lee Deuk-choon	(South Korea) Park Joo-bong (South Korea) Chung Myung-hee	Walkover	(silver) Runner-up
1988	French Open	(South Korea) Park Joo-bong	(Thailand) Sakrapee Thongsari (Thailand) Piyathip Sansaniyakulvilai	15–6, 15–6	(gold) Winner
1989	Japan Open	(South Korea) Lee Sang-bok	(South Korea) Park Joo-bong (South Korea) Chung Myung-hee	6–15, 3–15	(silver) Runner-up
1989	Swiss Open	(South Korea) Kim Moon-soo	(England) Nick Ponting (England) Cheryl Johnson	18–15, 15–4	(gold) Winner
1989	Malaysia Open	(South Korea) Park Joo-bong	(Denmark) Thomas Lund (Denmark) Pernille Dupont	15–7, 15–13	(gold) Winner
1989	Thailand Open	(South Korea) Park Joo-bong	(South Korea) Kim Moon-soo (South Korea) Hwang Hye-young	15–4, 15–2	(gold) Winner
1989	Hong Kong Open	(South Korea) Choi Sang-bum	(Hong Kong) Chan Chi Choi (Hong Kong) Amy Chan	15–12, 16–18, 15–2	(gold) Winner
1990	French Open	(South Korea) Kim Moon-soo	(South Korea) Park Joo-bong (South Korea) Chung Myung-hee	15–4, 15–6	(gold) Winner
1991	Malaysia Open	(South Korea) Lee Sang-bok	(Denmark) Thomas Lund (Denmark) Pernille Dupont	15–11, 15–8	(gold) Winner
1991	Thailand Open	(South Korea) Lee Sang-bok	(Thailand) Siripong Siripool (Thailand) Ladawan Mulasartsatorn	17–18, 15–4, 15–13	(gold) Winner
1996	U.S. Open	(South Korea) Kim Dong-moon	(England) Chris Hunt (Denmark) Helene Kirkegaard	15–5, 15–7	(gold) Winner

=== IBF International (2 titles, 2 runners-up) ===
Women's doubles
Year	Tournament	Partner	Opponent	Score	Result
1987	U.S. Open	(South Korea) Kim Ho-ja	(Canada) Johanne Falardeau (Canada) Denyse Julien	15–8, 15–6	(gold) Winner
1989	Hungarian International	(South Korea) Chung Myung-hee	(South Korea) Chun Sung-suk (South Korea) Lee Jung-mi	11–15, 15–10, 9–15	(silver) Runner-up

Mixed doubles
Year	Tournament	Partner	Opponent	Score	Result
1987	U.S. Open	(South Korea) Lee Deuk-choon	(Canada) Mike Butler (Canada) Claire Backhouse	15–12, 15–6	(gold) Winner
1989	Hungarian International	(South Korea) Shon Jin-hwan	(South Korea) Sung Han-kuk (South Korea) Chung Myung-hee	15–9, 10–15, 4–15	(silver) Runner-up
