= Hong Kong Open (badminton) =

Annual badminton tournament in Hong Kong

- Official website
- Founded: 1982; 44 years ago
- Editions: 36 (2026)
- Location: Kai Tak (2026); Hong Kong
- Venue: Kai Tak Arena (2026)
- Prize money: US$500,000 (2026)

Men's
- Draw: 32S / 32D
- Current champions: Anders Antonsen (singles); Man Wei Chong; Tee Kai Wun (doubles)
- Most singles titles: 5 Lin Dan; Lee Chong Wei
- Most doubles titles: 4 Lee Yong-dae

Women's
- Draw: 32S / 32D
- Current champions: Wang Zhiyi (singles); Jia Yifan; Zhang Shuxian (doubles)
- Most singles titles: 3 Han Aiping; Bang Soo-hyun; Xie Xingfang; Tai Tzu-ying
- Most doubles titles: 3 Yu Yang; Wang Xiaoli; Tian Qing; Zhao Yunlei; Jia Yifan

Mixed doubles
- Draw: 32
- Current champions: Feng Yanzhe; Huang Dongping
- Most titles (male): 4 Zhang Nan
- Most titles (female): 4 Zhao Yunlei

Super 500
- Arctic Open; Australian Open; Hong Kong Open; Hylo Open; Indonesia Masters; Japan Masters; Korea Open; Malaysia Masters; Thailand Open

Last completed
- 2025 Hong Kong Open

Ongoing
- 2026 Hong Kong Open

The Hong Kong Open (Chinese: 香港公開羽毛球錦標賽) is an annual badminton tournament held in Hong Kong, China. It is organized by Hong Kong Badminton Association, and it became one of the Super Series tournaments in 2007. BWF categorises it as a BWF World Tour Super 500 event in the BWF events structure since 2018.

== Championship venues ==
| Years active | Venue | Location |
|---|---|---|
| 1993, 2007–2010 | Queen Elizabeth Stadium | Wan Chai |
| 2011–2019, 2023–2025 | Hong Kong Coliseum | Hung Hom |
| 2026 | Kai Tak Arena | Kai Tak |

Locations of Hong Kong Open host cities

== Past winners ==
| Year | Men's singles | Women's singles | Men's doubles | Women's doubles | Mixed doubles | Ref |
|---|---|---|---|---|---|---|
| 1982 | (India) Prakash Padukone | (China) Xu Rong | (Indonesia) Heryanto (Indonesia) Kartono | (England) Nora Perry (England) Jane Webster | No competition | |
| 1983– 1984 | No competition | | | | | |
| 1985 | (China) Yang Yang | (China) Han Aiping | (Denmark) Steen Fladberg (Denmark) Jesper Helledie | (China) Han Aiping (China) Xu Rong | (England) Martin Dew (England) Gillian Gilks | |
| 1986 | (China) Yang Yang | (China) Li Lingwei | (Indonesia) Bobby Ertanto (Indonesia) Rudy Heryanto | (China) Li Lingwei (China) Han Aiping | (Scotland) Billy Gilliland (England) Nora Perry | |
| 1987 | (China) Xiong Guobao | (China) Han Aiping | (China) Zhang Qiang (China) Zhou Jincan | (South Korea) Chung So-young (South Korea) Kim Yun-ja | (Scotland) Billy Gilliland (England) Gillian Gowers | |
| 1988 | (Indonesia) Icuk Sugiarto | (South Korea) Lee Young-suk | (South Korea) Lee Gwang-jin (South Korea) Lee Sang-bok | (China) Guan Weizhen (China) Lin Ying | (South Korea) Park Joo-bong (South Korea) Chung Myung-hee | |
| 1989 | (China) Wu Wenkai | (China) Han Aiping | (Malaysia) Jalani Sidek (Malaysia) Razif Sidek | (China) Guan Weizhen (China) Lin Ying | (South Korea) Choi Sang-bum (South Korea) Chung So-young | |
| 1990 | No competition | | | | | |
| 1991 | (China) Liu Jun | (China) Huang Hua | (South Korea) Lee Sang-bok (South Korea) Shon Jin-hwan | (South Korea) Gil Young-ah (South Korea) Hwang Hye-young | (South Korea) Lee Sang-bok (South Korea) Shim Eun-jung | |
| 1992 | (China) Wu Wenkai | (South Korea) Bang Soo-hyun | (Indonesia) Rexy Mainaky (Indonesia) Ricky Subagja | (China) Nong Qunhua (China) Zhou Lei | (Indonesia) Aryono Miranat (Indonesia) Eliza Nathanael | |
| 1993 | (Indonesia) Hermawan Susanto | (China) Ye Zhaoying | (Indonesia) Antonius Ariantho (Indonesia) Denny Kantono | (China) Chen Ying (China) Wu Yuhong | (Indonesia) Rudy Gunawan (Indonesia) Rosiana Tendean | |
| 1994 | (Indonesia) Hariyanto Arbi | (South Korea) Bang Soo-hyun | (Indonesia) Rexy Mainaky (Indonesia) Ricky Subagja | (South Korea) Jang Hye-ock (South Korea) Shim Eun-jung | (Denmark) Thomas Lund (Denmark) Marlene Thomsen | |
| 1995 | (Indonesia) Hariyanto Arbi | (South Korea) Bang Soo-hyun | (South Korea) Ha Tae-kwon (South Korea) Kang Kyung-jin | (South Korea) Gil Young-ah (South Korea) Jang Hye-ock | (South Korea) Park Joo-bong (South Korea) Shim Eun-jung | |
| 1996 | (Chinese Taipei) Fung Permadi | (Denmark) Camilla Martin | (Indonesia) Antonius Ariantho (Indonesia) Denny Kantono | (Denmark) Lisbet Stuer-Lauridsen (Denmark) Marlene Thomsen | (Denmark) Michael Søgaard (Denmark) Rikke Olsen | |
| 1997 | (Denmark) Peter Gade | (China) Gong Ruina | (South Korea) Ha Tae-kwon (South Korea) Kim Dong-moon | (South Korea) Chung Jae-hee (South Korea) Ra Kyung-min | (South Korea) Kim Dong-moon (South Korea) Ra Kyung-min | |
| 1998 | (Indonesia) Budi Santoso | (Denmark) Camilla Martin | (Indonesia) Tony Gunawan (Indonesia) Candra Wijaya | (China) Chen Lin (China) Jiang Xuelian | (Denmark) Michael Søgaard (Denmark) Rikke Olsen | |
| 1999 | (China) Chen Wei | (China) Xie Xingfang | (Malaysia) Cheah Soon Kit (Malaysia) Yap Kim Hock | (China) Chen Lin (China) Jiang Xuelian | (Malaysia) Chan Chong Ming (Malaysia) Joanne Quay Swee Ling | |
| 2000 | No competition | | | | | |
| 2001 | (South Korea) Shon Seung-mo | (Thailand) Sujitra Ekmongkolpaisarn | (South Korea) Lee Dong-soo (South Korea) Yoo Yong-sung | (Singapore) Liu Zhen (Singapore) Xiao Luxi | (South Korea) Kim Dong-moon (South Korea) Ra Kyung-min | |
| 2002 | No competition | | | | | |
| 2003 | (China) Lin Dan | (China) Zhang Ning | (South Korea) Lee Dong-soo (South Korea) Yoo Yong-sung | (China) Gao Ling (China) Huang Sui | (South Korea) Kim Dong-moon (South Korea) Ra Kyung-min | |
| 2004 | No competition | | | | | |
| 2005 | (China) Lin Dan | (China) Zhang Ning | (China) Cai Yun (China) Fu Haifeng | (China) Yang Wei (China) Zhang Jiewen | (China) Xie Zhongbo (China) Zhang Yawen | |
| 2006 | (China) Lin Dan | (China) Xie Xingfang | (Indonesia) Markis Kido (Indonesia) Hendra Setiawan | (China) Yang Wei (China) Zhang Jiewen | (China) Zheng Bo (China) Zhao Tingting | |
| 2007 | (China) Lin Dan | (China) Xie Xingfang | (Indonesia) Markis Kido (Indonesia) Hendra Setiawan | (China) Du Jing (China) Yu Yang | (Indonesia) Nova Widianto (Indonesia) Liliyana Natsir | |
| 2008 | (China) Chen Jin | (Hong Kong) Wang Chen | (South Korea) Jung Jae-sung (South Korea) Lee Yong-dae | (China) Zhang Yawen (China) Zhao Tingting | (China) Xie Zhongbo (China) Zhang Yawen | |
| 2009 | (Malaysia) Lee Chong Wei | (China) Wang Yihan | (South Korea) Jung Jae-sung (South Korea) Lee Yong-dae | (China) Ma Jin (China) Wang Xiaoli | (Poland) Robert Mateusiak (Poland) Nadieżda Kostiuczyk | |
| 2010 | (Malaysia) Lee Chong Wei | (India) Saina Nehwal | (South Korea) Ko Sung-hyun (South Korea) Yoo Yeon-seong | (China) Wang Xiaoli (China) Yu Yang | (Denmark) Joachim Fischer Nielsen (Denmark) Christinna Pedersen | |
| 2011 | (China) Lin Dan | (China) Wang Xin | (China) Cai Yun (China) Fu Haifeng | (China) Wang Xiaoli (China) Yu Yang | (China) Zhang Nan (China) Zhao Yunlei | |
| 2012 | (China) Chen Long | (China) Li Xuerui | (China) Cai Yun (China) Fu Haifeng | (China) Tian Qing (China) Zhao Yunlei | (China) Zhang Nan (China) Zhao Yunlei | |
| 2013 | (Malaysia) Lee Chong Wei | (China) Wang Yihan | (South Korea) Lee Yong-dae (South Korea) Yoo Yeon-seong | (China) Bao Yixin (China) Tang Jinhua | (England) Chris Adcock (England) Gabrielle White | |
| 2014 | (South Korea) Son Wan-ho | (Chinese Taipei) Tai Tzu-ying | (Indonesia) Mohammad Ahsan (Indonesia) Hendra Setiawan | (China) Tian Qing (China) Zhao Yunlei | (China) Zhang Nan (China) Zhao Yunlei | |
| 2015 | (Malaysia) Lee Chong Wei | (Spain) Carolina Marín | (South Korea) Lee Yong-dae (South Korea) Yoo Yeon-seong | (China) Tian Qing (China) Zhao Yunlei | (China) Zhang Nan (China) Zhao Yunlei | |
| 2016 | (Hong Kong) Ng Ka Long | (Chinese Taipei) Tai Tzu-ying | (Japan) Takeshi Kamura (Japan) Keigo Sonoda | (Denmark) Christinna Pedersen (Denmark) Kamilla Rytter Juhl | (Indonesia) Tontowi Ahmad (Indonesia) Liliyana Natsir | |
| 2017 | (Malaysia) Lee Chong Wei | (Chinese Taipei) Tai Tzu-ying | (Indonesia) Marcus Fernaldi Gideon (Indonesia) Kevin Sanjaya Sukamuljo | (China) Chen Qingchen (China) Jia Yifan | (China) Zheng Siwei (China) Huang Yaqiong | |
| 2018 | (South Korea) Son Wan-ho | (Japan) Nozomi Okuhara | (Indonesia) Marcus Fernaldi Gideon (Indonesia) Kevin Sanjaya Sukamuljo | (Japan) Yuki Fukushima (Japan) Sayaka Hirota | (Japan) Yuta Watanabe (Japan) Arisa Higashino | |
| 2019 | (Hong Kong) Lee Cheuk Yiu | (China) Chen Yufei | (South Korea) Choi Sol-gyu (South Korea) Seo Seung-jae | (China) Chen Qingchen (China) Jia Yifan | (Japan) Yuta Watanabe (Japan) Arisa Higashino | |
| 2020 | Cancelled (Note: This tournament, originally to be played from 10 to 15 November, was later cancelled due to COVID-19 pandemic in Hong Kong.) | | | | | |
| 2021 | Cancelled (Note: This tournament, originally to be played from 16 to 21 November, was later cancelled due to COVID-19 pandemic in Hong Kong) | | | | | |
| 2022 | Cancelled (Note: This tournament, originally to be played from 8 to 13 November, was later cancelled due to COVID-19 pandemic in Hong Kong.) | | | | | |
| 2023 | (Indonesia) Jonatan Christie | (Japan) Akane Yamaguchi | (Denmark) Kim Astrup (Denmark) Anders Skaarup Rasmussen | (Indonesia) Apriyani Rahayu (Indonesia) Siti Fadia Silva Ramadhanti | (China) Guo Xinwa (China) Wei Yaxin | |
| 2024 | (Denmark) Viktor Axelsen | (China) Han Yue | (South Korea) Kang Min-hyuk (South Korea) Seo Seung-jae | (Malaysia) Pearly Tan (Malaysia) Thinaah Muralitharan | (China) Jiang Zhenbang (China) Wei Yaxin | |
| 2025 | (China) Li Shifeng | (China) Wang Zhiyi | (China) Liang Weikeng (China) Wang Chang | (China) Jia Yifan (China) Zhang Shuxian | (China) Feng Yanzhe (China) Huang Dongping | |
| 2026 | (Denmark) Anders Antonsen | (China) Wang Zhiyi | (Malaysia) Man Wei Chong (Malaysia) Tee Kai Wun | (Malaysia) Pearly Tan (Malaysia) Thinaah Muralitharan | (China) Feng Yanzhe (China) Huang Dongping | |

== Performances by nation ==
As of the 2026 edition

| Pos | Nation | MS | WS | MD | WD | XD | Total |
|---|---|---|---|---|---|---|---|
| 1 | China | 15 | 21 | 5 | 23 | 12 | 76 |
| 2 | South Korea | 3 | 4 | 13 | 5 | 7 | 32 |
| 3 | Indonesia | 6 | | 12 | 1 | 4 | 23 |
| 4 | Denmark | 3 | 2 | 2 | 2 | 4 | 13 |
| 5 | Malaysia | 5 | | 3 | 2 | 1 | 11 |
| 6 | Japan | | 2 | 1 | 1 | 2 | 6 |
| 7 | Chinese Taipei | 1 | 3 | | | | 4 |
| 7 | England | | | | 1 | 3 | 4 |
| 9 | Hong Kong | 2 | 1 | | | | 3 |
| 10 | India | 1 | 1 | | | | 2 |
| 11 | Poland | | | | | 1 | 1 |
| 11 | Scotland | | | | | 1 | 1 |
| 11 | Singapore | | | | 1 | | 1 |
| 11 | Spain | | 1 | | | | 1 |
| 11 | Thailand | | 1 | | | | 1 |
| Total | | 36 | 36 | 36 | 36 | 35* | 178 |

Notes:

* = No Mixed doubles competition at 1982
