= Taipei Open (badminton) =

Annual badminton tournament in Taiwan

- Official website
- Founded: 1980; 46 years ago
- Editions: 43 (2026)
- Location: Taipei (2026); Taiwan
- Venue: Taipei Arena (2026)
- Prize money: USD240,000 (2026)

Men's
- Draw: 32S / 32D
- Current champions: Yudai Okimoto (singles); Leo Rolly Carnando; Daniel Marthin (doubles)
- Most singles titles: 4 Chou Tien-chen
- Most doubles titles: 3 Chen Hung-ling; Antonius Ariantho; Denny Kantono; Jalani Sidek; Razif Sidek; Wang Chi-lin

Women's
- Draw: 32S / 32D
- Current champions: Tanvi Sharma (singles); Sumire Nakade; Miyu Takahashi (doubles)
- Most singles titles: 5 Tai Tzu-ying
- Most doubles titles: 4 Cheng Wen-hsing; Chien Yu-chin; Nora Perry

Mixed doubles
- Draw: 32
- Current champions: Yuta Watanabe; Maya Taguchi
- Most titles (male): 3 Michael Søgaard
- Most titles (female): 3 Rikke Olsen

Super 300
- Canada Open; German Open; Korea Masters; Macau Open; New Zealand Open; Orléans Masters; Spain Masters; Swiss Open; Syed Modi International; Taipei Open; Thailand Masters; U.S. Open

Last completed
- 2026 Taipei Open

The Taipei Open (Chinese: 台北羽球公開賽), formerly named the Chinese Taipei Open Grand Prix Gold (2007–2017) and Chinese Taipei Open (2018–2019), is an open badminton international championships held in Taiwan since the 1970s, but they took place only in irregular periods. Since 1980 they are regularly held, except in 1998, due to the Asian economic crisis, 2001, 2020, and 2021, the latter two due to the COVID-19 pandemic in Taiwan.

== Past winners ==
Year	Men's singles	Women's singles	Men's doubles	Women's doubles	Mixed doubles
1980	(Denmark) Flemming Delfs	(Denmark) Lene Køppen	(Indonesia) Bobby Ertanto (Indonesia) Hadibowo	(England) Nora Perry (England) Jane Webster	no competition
1981	(England) Kevin Jolly	(South Korea) Hwang Sun-ai	(Taiwan) Liu Hon-jai (Taiwan) Tseng Hsueh-chih	(England) Nora Perry (England) Jane Webster	no competition
1982	(Indonesia) Hadiyanto	(Indonesia) Ivana Lie	(England) Martin Dew (England) Mike Tredgett	(England) Nora Perry (England) Jane Webster	no competition
1983	(Indonesia) Icuk Sugiarto	(Denmark) Kirsten Larsen	(Indonesia) Bobby Ertanto (Indonesia) Hadibowo	(England) Gillian Clark (England) Gillian Gilks	no competition
1984	(Denmark) Morten Frost	(Indonesia) Ivana Lie	(Sweden) Stefan Karlsson (Sweden) Thomas Kihlström	(England) Karen Beckman (England) Gillian Gilks	no competition
1985	(Indonesia) Lius Pongoh	(England) Helen Troke	(Indonesia) Rudy Heryanto (Indonesia) Hariamanto Kartono	(England) Gillian Clark (England) Nora Perry	(England) Martin Dew (England) Gillian Gilks
1986	(Australia) Sze Yu	(Denmark) Kirsten Larsen	(Malaysia) Jalani Sidek (Malaysia) Razif Sidek	(Indonesia) Verawaty Fadjrin (Indonesia) Ivana Lie	(Scotland) Billy Gilliland (England) Nora Perry
1987	(Malaysia) Misbun Sidek	(Denmark) Kirsten Larsen	(Indonesia) Eddy Hartono (Indonesia) Liem Swie King	(South Korea) Chung Myung-hee (South Korea) Hwang Hye-young	(Denmark) Steen Fladberg (England) Gillian Clark
1988	(Indonesia) Icuk Sugiarto	(Denmark) Kirsten Larsen	(Thailand) Sawei Chanseorasmee (Thailand) Sakrapee Thongsari	(Sweden) Maria Bengtsson (Sweden) Christine Magnusson	(England) Andy Goode (England) Gillian Gowers
1989	(Denmark) Morten Frost	(Sweden) Christine Magnusson	(Malaysia) Jalani Sidek (Malaysia) Razif Sidek	(Sweden) Maria Bengtsson (Sweden) Christine Magnusson	(Denmark) Henrik Svarrer (Denmark) Dorte Kjær
1990	(Indonesia) Eddy Kurniawan	(South Korea) Chun Sung-suk	(Denmark) Mark Christiansen (Denmark) Michael Kjeldsen	(England) Gillian Clark (England) Gillian Gowers	(Denmark) Thomas Lund (Denmark) Pernille Dupont
1991	(Indonesia) Hermawan Susanto	(Indonesia) Susi Susanti	(Malaysia) Jalani Sidek (Malaysia) Razif Sidek	(Japan) Kimiko Jinnai (Japan) Hisako Mori	(Denmark) Thomas Lund (Denmark) Pernille Dupont
1992	(Indonesia) Ardy Wiranata	(Indonesia) Yuliani Santosa	(Malaysia) Cheah Soon Kit (Malaysia) Soo Beng Kiang	(South Korea) Gil Young-ah (South Korea) Shim Eun-jung	(Sweden) Pär-Gunnar Jönsson (Sweden) Maria Bengtsson
1993	(Indonesia) Hariyanto Arbi	(Sweden) Lim Xiaoqing	(Malaysia) Cheah Soon Kit (Malaysia) Soo Beng Kiang	(Sweden) Lim Xiaoqing (Sweden) Christine Magnusson	(Indonesia) Denny Kantono (Indonesia) Zelin Resiana
1994	(Indonesia) Hariyanto Arbi	(Indonesia) Susi Susanti	(Indonesia) Rudy Gunawan (Indonesia) Bambang Suprianto	(Indonesia) Finarsih (Indonesia) Lili Tampi	(Denmark) Michael Søgaard (England) Gillian Gowers
1995	(Indonesia) Hermawan Susanto	(Sweden) Lim Xiaoqing	(Indonesia) Antonius Ariantho (Indonesia) Denny Kantono	(Denmark) Helene Kirkegaard (Denmark) Rikke Olsen	(Denmark) Jens Eriksen (Denmark) Rikke Olsen
1996	(China) Dong Jiong	(Indonesia) Susi Susanti	(Indonesia) Antonius Ariantho (Indonesia) Denny Kantono	(China) Ge Fei (China) Gu Jun	(Denmark) Michael Søgaard (Denmark) Rikke Olsen
1997	(Denmark) Peter Gade	(Denmark) Camilla Martin	(Indonesia) Sigit Budiarto (Indonesia) Candra Wijaya	(South Korea) Park Soo-yun (South Korea) Yim Kyung-jin	(Indonesia) Sandiarto (Indonesia) Finarsih
1998	no competition				
1999	(Chinese Taipei) Fung Permadi	(China) Dai Yun	(Indonesia) Antonius Ariantho (Indonesia) Denny Kantono	(Denmark) Helene Kirkegaard (Denmark) Rikke Olsen	(China) Liu Yong (China) Ge Fei
2000	(Denmark) Peter Gade	(Netherlands) Mia Audina	(Indonesia) Tony Gunawan (Indonesia) Candra Wijaya	(South Korea) Chung Jae-hee (South Korea) Ra Kyung-min	(Denmark) Michael Søgaard (Denmark) Rikke Olsen
2001	no competition				
2002	(Indonesia) Taufik Hidayat	(Hong Kong) Wang Chen	(South Korea) Kim Dong-moon (South Korea) Ha Tae-kwon	(Thailand) Sathinee Chankrachangwong (Thailand) Saralee Thungthongkam	(Indonesia) Tri Kusharjanto (Indonesia) Emma Ermawati
2003	(Malaysia) Wong Choong Hann	(Netherlands) Mia Audina	(South Korea) Kim Dong-moon (South Korea) Ha Tae-kwon	(South Korea) Lee Kyung-won (South Korea) Ra Kyung-min	(South Korea) Kim Dong-moon (South Korea) Ra Kyung-min
2004	(Malaysia) Lee Chong Wei	(Japan) Chie Umezu	(Malaysia) Chan Chong Ming (Malaysia) Koo Kien Keat	(Chinese Taipei) Cheng Wen-hsing (Chinese Taipei) Chien Yu-chin	(Malaysia) Koo Kien Keat (Malaysia) Wong Pei Tty
2005	(South Korea) Lee Hyun-il	(England) Tracey Hallam	(United States) Tony Gunawan (United States) Halim Haryanto	(Chinese Taipei) Cheng Wen-hsing (Chinese Taipei) Chien Yu-chin	(United States) Tony Gunawan (Chinese Taipei) Cheng Wen-hsing
2006	(China) Lin Dan	(China) Zhang Ning	(China) Cai Yun (China) Fu Haifeng	(South Korea) Lee Hyo-jung (South Korea) Lee Kyung-won	(Indonesia) Nova Widianto (Indonesia) Liliyana Natsir
2007	(Indonesia) Sony Dwi Kuncoro	(Hong Kong) Wang Chen	(Indonesia) Markis Kido (Indonesia) Hendra Setiawan	(Chinese Taipei) Cheng Wen-hsing (Chinese Taipei) Chien Yu-chin	(Indonesia) Flandy Limpele (Indonesia) Vita Marissa
2008	(Indonesia) Simon Santoso	(India) Saina Nehwal	(Denmark) Mathias Boe (Denmark) Carsten Mogensen	(Chinese Taipei) Cheng Wen-hsing (Chinese Taipei) Chien Yu-chin	(Indonesia) Devin Lahardi Fitriawan (Indonesia) Lita Nurlita
2009	(Vietnam) Nguyễn Tiến Minh	(Chinese Taipei) Cheng Shao-chieh	(Chinese Taipei) Chen Hung-ling (Chinese Taipei) Lin Yu-lang	(China) Yang Wei (China) Zhang Jiewen	(India) Valiyaveetil Diju (India) Jwala Gutta
2010	(Indonesia) Simon Santoso	(Chinese Taipei) Cheng Shao-chieh	(South Korea) Jung Jae-sung (South Korea) Lee Yong-dae	(South Korea) Kim Min-jung (South Korea) Lee Hyo-jung	(Indonesia) Hendra Aprida Gunawan (Indonesia) Vita Marissa
2011	(Indonesia) Tommy Sugiarto	(South Korea) Sung Ji-hyun	(South Korea) Ko Sung-hyun (South Korea) Yoo Yeon-seong	(South Korea) Ha Jung-eun (South Korea) Kim Min-jung	(South Korea) Ko Sung-hyun (South Korea) Eom Hye-won
2012	(Vietnam) Nguyễn Tiến Minh	(Chinese Taipei) Tai Tzu-ying	(Malaysia) Mohd Zakry Abdul Latif (Malaysia) Fairuzizuan Tazari	(Indonesia) Pia Zebadiah Bernadet (Indonesia) Rizki Amelia Pradipta	(Indonesia) Muhammad Rijal (Indonesia) Debby Susanto
2013	(South Korea) Son Wan-ho	(South Korea) Sung Ji-hyun	(South Korea) Kim Gi-jung (South Korea) Kim Sa-rang	(South Korea) Jung Kyung-eun (South Korea) Kim Ha-na	(South Korea) Shin Baek-cheol (South Korea) Chang Ye-na
2014	(China) Lin Dan	(South Korea) Sung Ji-hyun	(Indonesia) Andrei Adistia (Indonesia) Hendra Aprida Gunawan	(Indonesia) Nitya Krishinda Maheswari (Indonesia) Greysia Polii	(China) Liu Yuchen (China) Yu Xiaohan
2015	(China) Chen Long	(China) Wang Yihan	(China) Fu Haifeng (China) Zhang Nan	(Indonesia) Nitya Krishinda Maheswari (Indonesia) Greysia Polii	(South Korea) Ko Sung-hyun (South Korea) Kim Ha-na
2016	(Chinese Taipei) Chou Tien-chen	(Chinese Taipei) Tai Tzu-ying	(China) Li Junhui (China) Liu Yuchen	(China) Huang Dongping (China) Zhong Qianxin	(China) Zheng Siwei (China) Chen Qingchen
2017	(Chinese Taipei) Chou Tien-chen	(Japan) Saena Kawakami	(Chinese Taipei) Chen Hung-ling (Chinese Taipei) Wang Chi-lin	(South Korea) Chae Yoo-jung (South Korea) Kim So-yeong	(South Korea) Seo Seung-jae (South Korea) Kim Ha-na
2018	(Malaysia) Lee Zii Jia	(Chinese Taipei) Tai Tzu-ying	(Chinese Taipei) Chen Hung-ling (Chinese Taipei) Wang Chi-lin	(Japan) Nami Matsuyama (Japan) Chiharu Shida	(Indonesia) Alfian Eko Prasetya (Indonesia) Marsheilla Gischa Islami
2019	(Chinese Taipei) Chou Tien-chen	(South Korea) Sung Ji-hyun	(Malaysia) Goh V Shem (Malaysia) Tan Wee Kiong	(Thailand) Jongkolphan Kititharakul (Thailand) Rawinda Prajongjai	(Hong Kong) Tang Chun Man (Hong Kong) Tse Ying Suet
2020	cancelled (Note: This tournament, originally to be played from 1 to 6 September, was later cancelled due to the COVID-19 pandemic in Taiwan.)				
2021	cancelled (Note: This tournament, originally to be played from 7 to 12 September, was later cancelled due to the COVID-19 pandemic in Taiwan.)				
2022	(Chinese Taipei) Chou Tien-chen	(Chinese Taipei) Tai Tzu-ying	(Malaysia) Man Wei Chong (Malaysia) Tee Kai Wun	(Hong Kong) Ng Tsz Yau (Hong Kong) Tsang Hiu Yan	(Hong Kong) Lee Chun Hei (Hong Kong) Ng Tsz Yau
2023	(Indonesia) Chico Aura Dwi Wardoyo	(Chinese Taipei) Tai Tzu-ying	(Malaysia) Man Wei Chong (Malaysia) Tee Kai Wun	(South Korea) Lee Yu-lim (South Korea) Shin Seung-chan	(Malaysia) Chen Tang Jie (Malaysia) Toh Ee Wei
2024	(Chinese Taipei) Lin Chun-yi	(South Korea) Sim Yu-jin	(Chinese Taipei) Lee Jhe-huei (Chinese Taipei) Yang Po-hsuan	(Indonesia) Febriana Dwipuji Kusuma (Indonesia) Amallia Cahaya Pratiwi	(Thailand) Pakkapon Teeraratsakul (Thailand) Phataimas Muenwong
2025	(Singapore) Loh Kean Yew	(Japan) Tomoka Miyazaki	(Chinese Taipei) Chiu Hsiang-chieh (Chinese Taipei) Wang Chi-lin	(Chinese Taipei) Hsieh Pei-shan (Chinese Taipei) Hung En-tzu	(Indonesia) Jafar Hidayatullah (Indonesia) Felisha Pasaribu
2026	(Japan) Yudai Okimoto	(India) Tanvi Sharma	(Indonesia) Leo Rolly Carnando (Indonesia) Daniel Marthin	(Japan) Sumire Nakade (Japan) Miyu Takahashi	(Japan) Yuta Watanabe (Japan) Maya Taguchi

== Performances by nation ==
As of the 2026 edition

No	Nation	MS	WS	MD	WD	XD	Total
1	Indonesia	16	6	13	6	10	51
2	South Korea	2	7	5	11	5	30
3	Chinese Taipei*	6	7	6	5	0.5	24.5
4	Denmark	5	6	2	2	7	22
5	China	4	3	3	3	3	16
5	Malaysia	4		10		2	16
7	England	1	2	1	7	3.5	14.5
8	Japan	1	3		3	1	8
8	Sweden		3	1	3	1	8
10	Hong Kong		2		1	2	5
11	Thailand			1	2	1	4
12	India		2			1	3
13	Netherlands		2				2
13	Vietnam	2					2
15	United States			1		0.5	1.5
16	Australia	1					1
16	Singapore	1					1
18	Scotland					0.5	0.5
Total		43	43	43	43	38	210

* Host nation

== See also ==
- List of sporting events in Taiwan
- Kaohsiung Masters
