= Chen Ying (badminton) =

Chinese badminton player (born 1971)

Chen Ying 陈颖
Personal information
- Born: 1 December 1971 (age 54) Xijiang, Guizhou, China
- Height: 1.75 m (5 ft 9 in)
- Weight: 67 kg (148 lb)

Sport
- Country: China
- Sport: Badminton
- Handedness: Right
- BWF profile
Medal record
Women's badminton
Representing China
World Championships
Silver medal – second place	1993 Birmingham	Women's doubles
World Cup
Bronze medal – third place	1994 Ho Chi Minh	Women's doubles
Uber Cup
Silver medal – second place	1994 Jakarta	Women's team
Silver medal – second place	1996 Hong Kong	Women's team
Asian Games
Bronze medal – third place	1994 Hiroshima	Women's team
Asian Championships
Silver medal – second place	1994 Shanghai	Women's doubles
Bronze medal – third place	1991 Kuala Lumpur	Women's singles
Asian Cup
Silver medal – second place	1994 Beijing	Women's doubles

Chen Ying (Chinese: 陈颖, born 1 December 1971) is a former Chinese badminton player who competed in the 1996 Summer Olympics. She partnered with Peng Xinyong in Women's doubles. She is frequently going to the final but ended up losing such as in 1994 Asian Championships, 1994 and 1996 Uber Cup. She also won a silver medal in the 1993 IBF World Championships – Women's doubles with Wu Yuhong, losing to their compatriot Nong Qunhua and Zhou Lei. and a bronze medal in Badminton at the 1994 Asian Games – Women's team. Her biggest title won are China Open and Hong Kong Open in 1993. Now she is retired and became a coach in ABC Badminton club in Los Angeles.

== Achievements ==
=== World Championships ===
Women's doubles
Year	Venue	Partner	Opponent	Score	Result
1993	National Indoor Arena; Birmingham, England	(China) Wu Yuhong	(China) Nong Qunhua (China) Zhou Lei	5–15, 10–15	Silver

=== World Cup ===
Women's doubles
Year	Venue	Partner	Opponent	Score	Result
1994	Phan Đình Phùng Indoor Stadium; Ho Chi Minh, Vietnam	(China) Wu Yuhong	(South Korea) Chung So-young (South Korea) Gil Young-ah	10–15, 7–15	Bronze

=== Asian Championships ===
Women's singles
Year	Venue	Opponent	Score	Result
1991	Cheras Stadium; Kuala Lumpur, Malaysia	(Indonesia) Yuliani Sentosa	6–11, 12–10, 4–11	Bronze

Women's doubles
Year	Venue	Partner	Opponent	Score	Result
1994	Shanghai Gymnasium; Shanghai, China	(China) Wu Yuhong	(China) Ge Fei (China) Gu Jun	11–15, 14–18	Silver

=== Asian Cup ===
Women's doubles
Year	Venue	Partner	Opponent	Score	Result
1994	Beijing Gymnasium; Beijing, China	(China) Wu Yuhong	(South Korea) Chung So-young (South Korea) Jang Hye-ock	9–15, 5–15	Silver

=== IBF World Grand Prix ===
The World Badminton Grand Prix sanctioned by International Badminton Federation (IBF) from 1983 to 2006.

Women's doubles
Year	Tournament	Partner	Opponent	Score	Result
1992	Singapore Open	(China) Sheng Wenqing	(England) Gillian Clark (England) Gillian Gowers	18–16, 4–15, 8–15	(silver) Runner-up
1993	German Open	(China) Wu Yuhong	(Indonesia) Finarsih (Indonesia) Lili Tampi	3–15, 10–15	(silver) Runner-up
1993	China Open	(China) Wu Yuhong	(China) Pan Li (China) Lin Yanfen	4–15, 15–12, 15–4	(gold) Winner
1993	Hong Kong Open	(China) Wu Yuhong	(Indonesia) Eliza Nathanael (Indonesia) Zelin Resiana	15–7, 15–8	(gold) Winner
1994	Korea Open	(China) Wu Yuhong	(South Korea) Chung So-young (South Korea) Gil Young-ah	8–15, 12–15	(silver) Runner-up
1995	Russian Open	(China) Peng Xinyong	(Russia) Elena Rybkhina (Russia) Marina Yakusheva	15–4, 15–12	(gold) Winner
1995	German Open	(China) Peng Xinyong	(Indonesia) Eliza Nathanael (Indonesia) Zelin Resiana	Walkover	(silver) Runner-up
2009	U.S. Open	(United States) Peng Yun	(Canada) Huang Ruilin (Canada) Jiang Xuelian	21–14, 15–21, 11–21	(silver) Runner-up

=== IBF International ===
Women's singles
Year	Tournament	Opponent	Score	Result
1990	Polish Open	(Denmark) Camilla Martin	4–11, 11–7, 11–1	(gold) Winner

Women's doubles
Year	Tournament	Partner	Opponent	Score	Result
1990	Polish Open	(China) Sheng Wenqing	(Denmark) Helene Kirkegaard (Denmark) Camilla Martin	18–15, 15–1	(gold) Winner
