= 1994 Badminton Asian Cup =

Badminton championships

1994 Asian Cup
Tournament details
- Dates: 14–18 June
- Total prize money: US$120,000
- Venue: Beijing Gymnasium
- Location: Beijing, China

The 1994 Badminton Asian Cup was the second edition of Badminton Asian Cup. It was held in Beijing Gymnasium, Beijing, China from 14 to 18 June with total prize money of US$120,000. Chinese team won titles in both the singles events and mixed doubles while Indonesia and South Korea won the men's doubles and women's doubles title respectively.

== Medalists ==
Event	Gold	Silver	Bronze
Men's singles	(China) Dong Jiong	(Indonesia) Hariyanto Arbi	(Indonesia) Joko Suprianto
Men's singles	(China) Dong Jiong	(Indonesia) Hariyanto Arbi	(China) Lin Liwen
Women's singles	(China) Ye Zhaoying	(China) Han Jingna	(Indonesia) Yuni Kartika
Women's singles	(China) Ye Zhaoying	(China) Han Jingna	(South Korea) Kim Ji-hyun
Men's doubles	(Indonesia) Rexy Mainaky (Indonesia) Ricky Subagja	(Malaysia) Cheah Soon Kit (Malaysia) Soo Beng Kiang	(Indonesia) Antonius Ariantho (Indonesia) Denny Kantono
Men's doubles	(Indonesia) Rexy Mainaky (Indonesia) Ricky Subagja	(Malaysia) Cheah Soon Kit (Malaysia) Soo Beng Kiang	(Malaysia) Tan Kim Her (Malaysia) Yap Kim Hock
Women's doubles	(South Korea) Chung So-young (South Korea) Jang Hye-ock	(China) Chen Ying (China) Wu Yuhong	(Thailand) Plernta Boonyarit (Thailand) Pornsawan Plungwech
Women's doubles	(South Korea) Chung So-young (South Korea) Jang Hye-ock	(China) Chen Ying (China) Wu Yuhong	(Indonesia) Finarsih (Indonesia) Zelin Resiana
Mixed doubles	(China) Liu Jianjun (China) Ge Fei	(Indonesia) Aryono Miranat (Indonesia) Eliza Nathanael	(Malaysia) Tan Kim Her (Malaysia) Tan Lee Wai
Mixed doubles	(China) Liu Jianjun (China) Ge Fei	(Indonesia) Aryono Miranat (Indonesia) Eliza Nathanael	(South Korea) Yoo Yong-sung (South Korea) Jang Hye-ock

=== Medal table ===
Rank	Nation	Gold	Silver	Bronze	Total
1	China (CHN)	3	2	1	6
2	Indonesia (INA)	1	2	4	7
3	South Korea	1	0	2	3
4	Malaysia (MAS)	0	1	2	3
5	Thailand (THA)	0	0	1	1
Totals (5 entries)		5	5	10	20

== Results ==
=== Semifinals ===
The table below gives an overview of the semifinals results of 1994 Asian Cup.

Event	Winner	Runner-up	Score
Men's singles	(China) Dong Jiong	(Indonesia) Joko Suprianto	15–12, 15–14
Men's singles	(Indonesia) Hariyanto Arbi	(China) Lin Liwen	15–10, 9–15, 15–12
Women's singles	(China) Ye Zhaoying	(Indonesia) Yuni Kartika	11–1, 11–3
Women's singles	(China) Han Jingna	(South Korea) Kim Ji-hyun	11–5, 11–8
Men's doubles	(Indonesia) Rexy Mainaky (Indonesia) Ricky Subagja	(Indonesia) Antonius Ariantho (Indonesia) Denny Kantono	15–2, 15–7
Men's doubles	(Malaysia) Cheah Soon Kit (Malaysia) Soo Beng Kiang	(Malaysia) Tan Kim Her (Malaysia) Yap Kim Hock	17–18, 15–0, 15–10
Women's doubles	(South Korea) Chung So-young (South Korea) Jang Hye-ock	(Thailand) Plernta Boonyarit (Thailand) Pornsawan Plungwech	15–2, 15–5
Women's doubles	(China) Chen Ying (China) Wu Yuhong	(Indonesia) Finarsih (Indonesia) Zelin Resiana	–, –
Mixed doubles	(China) Liu Jianjun (China) Ge Fei	(Malaysia) Tan Kim Her (Malaysia) Tan Lee Wai	15–2, 15–2
Mixed doubles	(Indonesia) Aryono Miranat (Indonesia) Eliza Nathanael	(South Korea) Yoo Yong-sung (South Korea) Jang Hye-ock	15–10, 18–16

=== Finals ===
Event	Winner	Finalist	Score
Men's singles	(China) Dong Jiong	(Indonesia) Hariyanto Arbi	12–15, 18–17, 15–11
Women's singles	(China) Ye Zhaoying	(China) Han Jingna	11–6, 9–12, 11–3
Men's doubles	(Indonesia) Rexy Mainaky (Indonesia) Ricky Subagja	(Malaysia) Cheah Soon Kit (Malaysia) Soo Beng Kiang	15–8, 15–7
Women's doubles	(South Korea) Chung So-young (South Korea) Jang Hye-ock	(China) Chen Ying (China) Wu Yuhong	15–9, 15–5
Mixed doubles	(China) Liu Jianjun (China) Ge Fei	(Indonesia) Aryono Miranat (Indonesia) Eliza Nathanael	15–4, 13–15, 15–10

== Sources ==
- New Straits Times, 17 June 1994, p. 46
- New Straits Times, 19 June 1994, p. 25
