= 1991 Asian Badminton Championships =

Badminton championships

Tournament information
- Location: Cheras Stadium, Kuala Lumpur, Malaysia
- Dates: February 20–February 24

The 1991 Asian Badminton Championships was the 10th tournament of the Asian Badminton Championships. It was held in Cheras Indoor Stadium, in Kuala Lumpur, Malaysia, from 20 to 24 February 1991.

== Medalists ==
Event	Gold	Silver	Bronze
Men's singles	(Malaysia) Rashid Sidek	(Malaysia) Foo Kok Keong	(Indonesia) Eddy Kurniawan
Men's singles	(Malaysia) Rashid Sidek	(Malaysia) Foo Kok Keong	(China) Wu Wenkai
Women's singles	(Indonesia) Yuliani Santosa	(South Korea) Shim Eun-jung	(China) Chen Ying
Women's singles	(Indonesia) Yuliani Santosa	(South Korea) Shim Eun-jung	(South Korea) Lee Heung-soon
Men's doubles	(South Korea) Kim Moon-soo (South Korea) Park Joo-bong	(China) Chen Hongyong (China) Chen Kang	(Malaysia) Cheah Soon Kit (Malaysia) Soo Beng Kiang
Men's doubles	(South Korea) Kim Moon-soo (South Korea) Park Joo-bong	(China) Chen Hongyong (China) Chen Kang	(Indonesia) Richard Mainaky (Indonesia) Ricky Subagja
Women's doubles	(South Korea) Chung So-young (South Korea) Hwang Hye-young	(South Korea) Gil Young-ah (South Korea) Shim Eun-jung	(China) Liu Yuhong (China) Wu Wenjing
Women's doubles	(South Korea) Chung So-young (South Korea) Hwang Hye-young	(South Korea) Gil Young-ah (South Korea) Shim Eun-jung	(China) Pan Li (China) Wu Yuhong
Mixed doubles	(South Korea) Park Joo-bong (South Korea) Chung Myung-hee	(South Korea) Lee Sang-bok (South Korea) Chung So-young	(Malaysia) Tan Kim Her (Malaysia) Tan Sui Hoon
Mixed doubles	(South Korea) Park Joo-bong (South Korea) Chung Myung-hee	(South Korea) Lee Sang-bok (South Korea) Chung So-young	(China) Yu Yong (China) Wu Yuhong

== Medal table ==
Rank	Nation	Gold	Silver	Bronze	Total
1	South Korea (KOR)	3	3	1	7
2	Malaysia (MAS)	1	1	2	4
3	Indonesia (INA)	1	0	2	3
4	China (CHN)	0	1	5	6
Totals (4 entries)		5	5	10	20

=== Finals ===
Category	Winners	Runners-up	Score
Men's singles	(Malaysia) Rashid Sidek	(Malaysia) Foo Kok Keong	4–15, 15–11, 15–2
Women's singles	(Indonesia) Yuliani Santosa	(South Korea) Shim Eun-jung	3–11, 11–8, 11–2
Men's doubles	(South Korea) Kim Moon-soo (South Korea) Park Joo-bong	(China) Chen Hongyong (China) Chen Kang	15–12, 15–10
Women's doubles	(South Korea) Chung So-young (South Korea) Hwang Hye-young	(South Korea) Gil Young-ah (South Korea) Shim Eun-jung	15–2, 13–18, 15–4
Mixed doubles	(South Korea) Park Joo-bong (South Korea) Chung Myung-hee	(South Korea) Lee Sang-bok (South Korea) Chung So-young	15–7, 15–4

=== Semifinals ===
Category	Winner	Runner-up	Score
Men's singles	(Malaysia) Rashid Sidek	(China) Wu Wenkai	4–15, 15–7, 15–9
Men's singles	(Malaysia) Foo Kok Keong	(Indonesia) Eddy Kurniawan	15–11, 15–13
Women's singles	(South Korea) Shim Eun-jung	(South Korea) Lee Heung-soon	11–4, 11–12, 11–3
Women's singles	(Indonesia) Yuliani Sentosa	(China) Chen Ying	11–6, 10–12, 11–4
Men's doubles	(South Korea) Kim Moon-soo (South Korea) Park Joo-bong	(Malaysia) Cheah Soon Kit (Malaysia) Soo Beng Kiang	15–7, 15–7
Men's doubles	(China) Chen Hongyong (China) Chen Kang	(Indonesia) Richard Mainaky (Indonesia) Ricky Subagja	15–11, 12–15, 17–14
Women's doubles	(South Korea) Chung So-young (South Korea) Hwang Hye-young	(China) Pan Li (China) Wu Yuhong	15–10, 15–5
Women's doubles	(South Korea) Gil Young-ah (South Korea) Shim Eun-jung	(China) Liu Yuhong (China) Wu Wenjing	15–1, 15–2
Mixed doubles	(South Korea) Park Joo-bong (South Korea) Chung Myung-hee	(Malaysia) Tan Kim Her (Malaysia) Tan Sui Hoon	15–3, 15–4
Mixed doubles	(South Korea) Lee Sang-bok (South Korea) Chung So-young	(China) Yu Yong (China) Wu Yuhong	15–4, 18–13
