= 1993 Badminton World Cup =

Badminton championships

1993 Wills Badminton World Cup
Tournament details
- Dates: 1–5 September 1993
- Edition: 15th
- Venue: Indira Gandhi Indoor Stadium
- Location: New Delhi, India

The 1993 Wills Badminton World Cup was the fifteenth edition of an international tournament Badminton World Cup. The event was held in New Delhi, India in from 1 September to 5 September 1993. Indonesia won both the singles event with men's doubles while Sweden won women's doubles and cross country pair from England & Sweden combined won the mixed doubles.

== Medalists ==
Event	Gold	Silver	Bronze
Men's singles	(Indonesia) Alan Budikusuma	(Indonesia) Joko Suprianto	(Indonesia) Hermawan Susanto
Men's singles	(Indonesia) Alan Budikusuma	(Indonesia) Joko Suprianto	(Malaysia) Rashid Sidek
Women's singles	(Indonesia) Susi Susanti	(Sweden) Lim Xiaoqing	(Thailand) Somharuthai Jaroensiri
Women's singles	(Indonesia) Susi Susanti	(Sweden) Lim Xiaoqing	(China) Ye Zhaoying
Men's doubles	(Indonesia) Rexy Mainaky (Indonesia) Ricky Subagja	(China) Chen Hongyong (China) Chen Kang	(Malaysia) Cheah Soon Kit (Malaysia) Soo Beng Kiang
Men's doubles	(Indonesia) Rexy Mainaky (Indonesia) Ricky Subagja	(China) Chen Hongyong (China) Chen Kang	(Sweden) Peter Axelsson (Sweden) Pär-Gunnar Jönsson
Women's doubles	(Sweden) Christine Magnusson (Sweden) Lim Xiaoqing	(South Korea) Chung So-young (South Korea) Gil Young-ah	(Indonesia) Finarsih (Indonesia) Lili Tampi
Women's doubles	(Sweden) Christine Magnusson (Sweden) Lim Xiaoqing	(South Korea) Chung So-young (South Korea) Gil Young-ah	(China) Lin Yanfen (China) Yao Fen
Mixed doubles	(Sweden) Peter Axelsson (England) Gillian Gowers	(Indonesia) Aryono Miranat (Indonesia) Eliza Nathanael	(England) Nick Ponting (England) Gillian Clark
Mixed doubles	(Sweden) Peter Axelsson (England) Gillian Gowers	(Indonesia) Aryono Miranat (Indonesia) Eliza Nathanael	(Sweden) Pär-Gunnar Jönsson (Sweden) Maria Bengtsson

== Men's singles ==
=== Finals ===
Semi-finals
(Indonesia) Joko Suprianto	15	15
(Malaysia) Rashid Sidek	9	3
(Indonesia) Hermawan Susanto	11	5
(Indonesia) Alan Budikusuma	15	15

Final
(Indonesia) Joko Suprianto	8	16
(Indonesia) Alan Budikusuma	15	17

== Women's singles ==
=== Finals ===
Semi-finals
(Indonesia) Susi Susanti	11	11
(Thailand) Somharuthai Jaroensiri	0	9
(Sweden) Lim Xiaoqing	11	2	11
(China) Ye Zhaoying	2	11	6

Final
(Indonesia) Susi Susanti	11	11
(Sweden) Lim Xiaoqing	7	5

== Men's doubles ==
=== Finals ===
Semi-finals
(Indonesia) Rexy Mainaky (Indonesia) Ricky Subagja	15	15
(Malaysia) Cheah Soon Kit (Malaysia) Soo Beng Kiang	9	11
(Sweden) Peter Axelsson (Sweden) Pär-Gunnar Jönsson	9	5
(China) Chen Hongyong (China) Chen Kang	15	15

Final
(Indonesia) Rexy Mainaky (Indonesia) Ricky Subagja	15	12	15
(China) Chen Hongyong (China) Chen Kang	7	15	9

== Women's doubles ==
=== Finals ===
Semi-finals
(Indonesia) Lili Tampi (Indonesia) Finarsih	10	3
(Sweden) Christine Magnusson (Sweden) Lim Xiaoqing	15	15
(China) Lin Yanfen (China) Yao Fen	9	10
(South Korea) Chung So-young (South Korea) Gil Young-ah	15	15

Final
(Sweden) Christine Magnusson (Sweden) Lim Xiaoqing	15	15
(South Korea) Chung So-young (South Korea) Gil Young-ah	12	9

== Mixed doubles ==
=== Finals ===
Semi-finals
(England) Nick Ponting (England) Gillian Clark	12	11
(Sweden) Peter Axelsson (England) Gillian Gowers	15	15
(Indonesia) Aryono Miranat (Indonesia) Eliza Nathanael	17	7	15
(Sweden) Pär-Gunnar Jönsson (Sweden) Maria Bengtsson	14	15	9

Final
(Sweden) Peter Axelsson (England) Gillian Gowers	10	15	15
(Indonesia) Aryono Miranat (Indonesia) Eliza Nathanael	15	7	5

== Sources ==
- "Bulu Tangkis Piala Dunia: Hermawan tak Ingin Jadi Penjegal Lagi". Kompas (in Indonesian). 24 August 1993.
- "Bulu Tangkis Piala Dunia. Lili/Finarsih dan Hermawan Gagal". Kompas (in Indonesian). 5 September 1993. p. 18.
- "All Malaysians out as Indons hold sway". New Straits Times. 5 September 1993. p. 17.
- https://www.myheritage.com/research/record-10450-9511904/canberra-times-act-sep-6-1993?snippet=25774e56323f3398e7e63c53ad90b16d#fullscreen
