= Yuliani Santosa =

Indonesian badminton player

Personal information
- Born: 29 October 1971 (age 55) Semarang, Central Java, Indonesia

Sport
- Country: Indonesia
- Sport: Badminton
- Handedness: Right
- Event: Women's singles

Women's singles
- BWF profile
Medal record
Women's badminton
Representing Indonesia
Uber Cup
Gold medal – first place	1994 Jakarta	Women's team
Gold medal – first place	1996 Hong Kong	Women's team
Asian Games
Silver medal – second place	1994 Hiroshima	Women's team
Asian Championships
Gold medal – first place	1991 Kuala Lumpur	Women's singles
Asian Cup
Bronze medal – third place	1991 Jakarta	Women's singles
SEA Games
Gold medal – first place	1991 Manila	Women's team
Gold medal – first place	1993 Singapore	Women's team
Silver medal – second place	1993 Singapore	Women's singles

Yuliani Santosa (born 29 October 1971) is an Indonesian retired badminton player. She won the 1991 Asian Championships in Kuala Lumpur, Malaysia.

== Achievements ==
=== Asian Championships ===
Women's singles
Year	Venue	Opponent	Score	Result
1991	Cheras Stadium; Kuala Lumpur, Malaysia	(South Korea) Shim Eun-jung	3–11, 11–8, 11–2	Gold

=== Asian Cup ===
Women's singles
Year	Venue	Opponent	Score	Result
1991	Istora Senayan; Jakarta, Indonesia	(South Korea) Bang Soo-hyun	11–6, 8–11, 4–11	Bronze

=== SEA Games ===
Women's singles
Year	Venue	Opponent	Score	Result
1993	Singapore Badminton Hall, Singapore	(Indonesia) Sarwendah Kusumawardhani	6–11, 11–9, 2–11	Silver

=== IBF World Grand Prix ===
The World Badminton Grand Prix was sanctioned by the International Badminton Federation from 1983 to 2006.

Women's singles
Year	Tournament	Opponent	Score	Result
1988	Swiss Open	(Germany) Christine Skropke	9–11, 0–11	(silver) Runner-up
1992	Chinese Taipei Open	(Sweden) Christine Magnusson	11–6, 9–12, 11–9	(gold) Winner
1993	Chinese Taipei Open	(Sweden) Lim Xiaoqing	6–11, 12–9, 5–11	(silver) Runner-up
1993	Swiss Open	(Sweden) Lim Xiaoqing	11–6, 11–7	(gold) Winner
1994	Singapore Open	(South Korea) Ra Kyung-min	9–12, 5–11	(silver) Runner-up
1995	Chinese Taipei Open	(Sweden) Lim Xiaoqing	1–11, 5–11	(silver) Runner-up
1996	Swiss Open	(Denmark) Camilla Martin	11–4, 6–11, 2–11	(silver) Runner-up

IBF Grand Prix tournament
IBF Grand Prix Finals tournament

=== IBF International ===
Women's singles
Year	Tournament	Opponent	Score	Result
1991	Polish Open	(Soviet Union) Vlada Tcherniavskaia	11–1, 11–6	(gold) Winner
