= Tomomi Matsuo =

Japanese badminton player (born 1968)

Personal information
- Born: 15 August 1968 (age 57) Tokyo, Japan
- Height: 1.69 m (5 ft 7 in)
- Weight: 67 kg (148 lb)

Sport
- Country: Japan
- Sport: Badminton
- Handedness: Right
- Event: Women's doubles
- BWF profile
Medal record
Women's badminton
Representing Japan
Uber Cup
Bronze medal – third place	1990 Nagoya & Tokyo	Women's team
Asian Games
Bronze medal – third place	1994 Hiroshima	Women's doubles
Bronze medal – third place	1990 Beijing	Women's team
Bronze medal – third place	1994 Hiroshima	Women's team
Asian Cup
Bronze medal – third place	1996 Seoul	Women's doubles

Tomomi Matsuo (松尾 知美, Matsuo Tomomi; born 15 August 1968) is a Japanese badminton player. She competed in women's doubles with teammate Kyoko Sasage at the 1992 Summer Olympics in Barcelona. She competed in women's doubles with teammate Masako Sakamoto at the 1996 Summer Olympics in Atlanta.

== Achievements ==
=== Asian Cup ===
Women's doubles

Year	Venue	Partner	Opponent	Score	Result
1996	Olympic Gymnasium No. 2, Seoul, South Korea	(Japan) Masako Sakamoto	(Indonesia) Indarti Issolina (Indonesia) Deyana Lomban	8–15, 12–15	Bronze
