= Shim Eun-jung =

South Korean badminton player

Personal information
- Born: 8 June 1971 (age 55)
- Height: 1.7 m (5 ft 7 in)

Sport
- Country: South Korea
- Sport: Badminton
- Handedness: Right
- BWF profile
Medal record
Women's badminton
Representing South Korea
Olympic Games
| Bronze medal – third place | 1992 Barcelona | Women's doubles |
World Championships
| Bronze medal – third place | 1991 Copenhagen | Women's doubles |
| Bronze medal – third place | 1991 Copenhagen | Mixed doubles |
Uber Cup
| Silver medal – second place | 1992 Kuala Lumpur | Women's team |
| Bronze medal – third place | 1994 Jakarta | Women's team |
Asian Games
| Gold medal – first place | 1994 Hiroshima | Women's doubles |
| Gold medal – first place | 1994 Hiroshima | Women's team |
| Bronze medal – third place | 1990 Beijing | Women's team |
Asian Championships
| Silver medal – second place | 1991 Kuala Lumpur | Women's singles |
| Silver medal – second place | 1991 Kuala Lumpur | Women's doubles |
| Bronze medal – third place | 1994 Shanghai | Women's doubles |

- Korean name
- Hangul: 심은정
- Hanja: 沈恩婷
- RR: Sim Eunjeong
- MR: Sim Ŭnjŏng

Shim Eun-jung (Korean: 심은정; born 8 June 1971) is a South Korean badminton player. She won the bronze medal in women's doubles with Gil Young-ah at the 1992 Barcelona Olympics.

== Achievements ==
=== Olympic Games ===
Women's doubles
| Year | Venue | Partner | Opponent | Score | Result |
|---|---|---|---|---|---|
| 1992 | Pavelló de la Mar Bella, Barcelona, Spain | (South Korea) Gil Young-ah | (China) Guan Weizhen (China) Nong Qunhua | 12–15, 15–2, 8–15 | Bronze |

=== World Championships ===
Women's doubles
| Year | Venue | Partner | Opponent | Score | Result |
|---|---|---|---|---|---|
| 1991 | Brøndby Arena, Copenhagen, Denmark | (South Korea) Gil Young-ah | (Sweden) Maria Bengtsson (Sweden) Christine Magnusson | 15–8, 8–15, 5–15 | Bronze |

Mixed doubles
| Year | Venue | Partner | Opponent | Score | Result |
|---|---|---|---|---|---|
| 1991 | Brøndby Arena, Copenhagen, Denmark | (South Korea) Kang Kyung-jin | (Denmark) Thomas Lund (Denmark) Pernille Dupont | 7–15, 17–15, 7–15 | Bronze |

=== Asian Games ===
Women's doubles
| Year | Venue | Partner | Opponent | Score | Result |
|---|---|---|---|---|---|
| 1994 | Tsuru Memorial Gymnasium, Hiroshima, Japan | (South Korea) Jang Hye-ock | (South Korea) Chung So-young (South Korea) Gil Young-ah | 15–9, 15–3 | Gold |

=== Asian Championships ===
Women's singles
| Year | Venue | Opponent | Score | Result |
|---|---|---|---|---|
| 1991 | Cheras Indoor Stadium, Kuala Lumpur, Malaysia | (Indonesia) Yuliani Santosa | 11–3, 8–11, 2–11 | Silver |

Women's doubles
| Year | Venue | Partner | Opponent | Score | Result |
|---|---|---|---|---|---|
| 1991 | Cheras Indoor Stadium, Kuala Lumpur, Malaysia | (South Korea) Gil Young-ah | (South Korea) Chung So-young (South Korea) Hwang Hye-young | 2–15, 18–13, 4–15 | Silver |
| 1994 | Shanghai Gymnasium, Shanghai, China | (South Korea) Jang Hye-ock | (China) Ge Fei (China) Gu Jun | 6–15, 8–15 | Bronze |

=== IBF World Grand Prix ===
The World Badminton Grand Prix sanctioned by International Badminton Federation (IBF) from 1983 to 2006.

Women's singles
| Year | Tournament | Opponent | Score | Result |
|---|---|---|---|---|
| 1991 | Canada Open | (Soviet Union) Elena Rybkina | 3–11, 4–11 | (silver) Runner-up |
| 1991 | U.S. Open | (Austria) Irina Serova | 11–8, 11–2 | (gold) Winner |

Women's doubles
| Year | Tournament | Partner | Opponent | Score | Result |
|---|---|---|---|---|---|
| 1990 | Chinese Taipei Open | (South Korea) Chun Sung-suk | (England) Gillian Clark (England) Gillian Gowers | 3–15, 6–15 | (silver) Runner-up |
| 1991 | Canada Open | (South Korea) Kang Bok-seung | (England) Gillian Gowers (England) Sara Sankey | 15–12, 12–15, 15–17 | (silver) Runner-up |
| 1991 | U.S. Open | (South Korea) Kang Bok-seung | (Indonesia) Catherine (Indonesia) Eliza Nathanael | 15–7, 15–13 | (gold) Winner |
| 1991 | Hong Kong Open | (South Korea) Chung Myung-hee | (South Korea) Gil Young-ah (South Korea) Hwang Hye-young | 10–15, 4–15 | (silver) Runner-up |
| 1992 | Chinese Taipei Open | (South Korea) Gil Young-ah | (Netherlands) Eline Coene (Netherlands) Erica van den Heuvel | 15–7, 15–4 | (gold) Winner |
| 1992 | Japan Open | (South Korea) Gil Young-ah | (South Korea) Chung So-young (South Korea) Hwang Hye-young | 5–15, 10–15 | (silver) Runner-up |
| 1992 | Korea Open | (South Korea) Gil Young-ah | (South Korea) Chung So-young (South Korea) Hwang Hye-young | 6–15, 7–15 | (silver) Runner-up |
| 1994 | Swedish Open | (South Korea) Jang Hye-ock | (South Korea) Chung So-young (South Korea) Gil Young-ah | 9–15, 11–15 | (silver) Runner-up |
| 1994 | All England Open | (South Korea) Jang Hye-ock | (South Korea) Chung So-young (South Korea) Gil Young-ah | 15–7, 8–15, 4–15 | (silver) Runner-up |
| 1994 | Hong Kong Open | (South Korea) Jang Hye-ock | (China) Ge Fei (China) Gu Jun | 15–11, 18–14 | (gold) Winner |

Mixed doubles
| Year | Tournament | Partner | Opponent | Score | Result |
|---|---|---|---|---|---|
| 1991 | U.S. Open | (South Korea) Lee Sang-bok | (England) Nick Ponting (England) Gillian Gowers | 18–14, 15–2 | (gold) Winner |
| 1991 | Hong Kong Open | (South Korea) Lee Sang-bok | (South Korea) Shon Jin-hwan (South Korea) Gil Young-ah | 17–15, 15–1 | (gold) Winner |
| 1992 | Korea Open | (South Korea) Lee Sang-bok | (Denmark) Thomas Lund (Denmark) Pernille Dupont | 11–15, 9–15 | (silver) Runner-up |
| 1994 | Hong Kong Open | (South Korea) Ha Tae-Kwon | (Denmark) Thomas Lund (Denmark) Marlene Thomsen | 14–17, 12–15 | (silver) Runner-up |
| 1995 | Hong Kong Open | (South Korea) Park Joo-bong | (China) Liu Jianjun (China) Sun Man | 15–8, 2–15, 17–14 | (gold) Winner |
| 1995 | China Open | (South Korea) Park Joo-bong | (China) Chen Xingdong (China) Peng Xinyong | 11–15, 15–4, 10–15 | (silver) Runner-up |
