= Wu Yuhong =

Chinese badminton player

Wu Yuhong 吴宇红
Personal information
- Born: 3 November 1966 (age 60) Hualien, Taiwan
- Height: 1.68 m (5 ft 6 in)

Sport
- Country: China
- Sport: Badminton
- Handedness: Right
- Event: Women's doubles

Women's doubles
- BWF profile
Medal record
Women's badminton
Representing China
World Championships
Silver medal – second place	1993 Birmingham	Women's doubles
World Cup
Bronze medal – third place	1994 Ho Chi Minh	Women's doubles
Uber Cup
Gold medal – first place	1992 Kuala Lumpur	Women's team
Silver medal – second place	1994 Jakarta	Women's team
Asian Games
Bronze medal – third place	1994 Hiroshima	Women's team
Asian Championships
Gold medal – first place	1992 Kuala Lumpur	Women's doubles
Silver medal – second place	1994 Shanghai	Women's doubles
Bronze medal – third place	1991 Kuala Lumpur	Women's doubles
Bronze medal – third place	1991 Kuala Lumpur	Mixed doubles
Asian Cup
Silver medal – second place	1994 Beijing	Women's doubles
East Asian Games
Gold medal – first place	1993 Shanghai	Women's team

Wu Yuhong (Chinese: 吴宇红; pinyin: Wú Yùhóng, born 3 November 1966) is a former Chinese badminton player. Yuhong was the runner-up in 1993 Birmingham World Championships and has won medals in several other prominent competitions such as World Cup, Uber Cup, Asian Cup, Asian Championships, Asian Games and East Asian Games.

== Career ==
Wu Yuhong, whose ancestral home is in Hualien county, Taiwan, is a member of the Ami tribe of Taiwan’s aboriginal tribe and a member of the Taiwan League. In the 14th Uber Cup held in 1992, she won the gold medal, beating South Korea in the final. She won 1992 Asian Badminton Championships, 1993 East Asian Games team event, China Open, Hong Kong Open, National championships twice, and most importantly World Badminton Championships women’s doubles runner-up in 1993. She also won a silver in the 1994 Uber Cup after losing to Indonesian team. She has won nearly 100 championships, runner-up medals and trophies. After retiring from the national team, she was invited to Thailand to serve as the coach of the country's badminton women's team. She currently works at the Ping-Badminton Center of the Fujian Provincial Sports Industry Brigade, in charge of administrative work related to the event, and she is still a badminton coach in her spare time.

== Family ==
Wu Yuhong was born in a sports family. Her father, Wu Yuanjin, came to People's republic of China from Taiwan in his early years. In the 1950s, he won consecutive hurdles and long jump championships in the All-Army Games, and later served as the captain of the Bayi Track and Field Team. He is also a well-known social activist and former Taiwan Federation of Fujian Province. Wu Yuhong's mother, Chen Shaoying, was the champion of the first National Games Women's Cycling Race and her brother Wu Yuqi was a member of the Bayi Parachuting Team.

== Achievements ==
=== World Championships ===
Women's doubles
Year	Venue	Partner	Opponent	Score	Result
1993	National Indoor Arena, Birmingham, England	(China) Chen Ying	(China) Nong Qunhua (China) Zhou Lei	5–15, 10–15	Silver

=== World Cup ===
Women's doubles
Year	Venue	Partner	Opponent	Score	Result
1994	Phan Đình Phùng Indoor Stadium; Ho Chi Minh, Vietnam	(China) Chen Ying	(South Korea) Chung So-young (South Korea) Gil Young-ah	10–15, 7–15	Bronze

=== Asian Championships ===
Women's doubles
Year	Venue	Partner	Opponent	Score	Result
1991	Cheras Indoor Stadium, Kuala Lumpur, Malaysia	(China) Pan Li	(South Korea) Chung So-young (South Korea) Hwang Hye-young	5–15, 10–15	Bronze
1992	Cheras Indoor Stadium, Kuala Lumpur, Malaysia	(China) Pan Li	(Thailand) Ladawan Mulasartsatorn (Thailand) Piyathip Sansaniyakulvilai	15–0, 15–6	Gold
1994	Shanghai Gymnasium, Shanghai, China	(China) Chen Ying	(China) Ge Fei (China) Gu Jun	11–15, 14–18	Silver

Mixed doubles
Year	Venue	Partner	Opponent	Score	Result
1991	Cheras Indoor Stadium, Kuala Lumpur, Malaysia	(China) Yu Yong	(South Korea) Lee Sang-bok (South Korea) Chung So-young	4–15, 13–18	Bronze

=== Asian Cup ===
Women's doubles
Year	Venue	Partner	Opponent	Score	Result
1994	Beijing Gymnasium, Beijing, China	(China) Chen Ying	(South Korea) Chung So-young (South Korea) Jang Hye-ock	9–15, 5–15	Silver

=== IBF World Grand Prix ===
The World Badminton Grand Prix sanctioned by International Badminton Federation (IBF) from 1983 to 2006.

Women's doubles
Year	Tournament	Partner	Opponent	Score	Result
1991	Finnish Open	(China) Pan Li	(England) Gillian Clark (Denmark) Nettie Nielsen	9–15, 17–14, 11–15	(silver) Runner-up
1992	China Open	(China) Pan Li	(China) Yao Fen (China) Lin Yanfen	14–17, 4–15	(silver) Runner-up
1993	German Open	(China) Chen Ying	(Indonesia) Finarsih (Indonesia) Lili Tampi	3–15, 10–15	(silver) Runner-up
1993	China Open	(China) Chen Ying	(China) Pan Li (China) Lin Yanfen	4–15, 15–12, 15–4	(gold) Winner
1993	Hong Kong Open	(China) Chen Ying	(Indonesia) Eliza Nathanael (Indonesia) Zelin Resiana	15–7, 15–8	(gold) Winner
1994	Korea Open	(China) Chen Ying	(South Korea) Chung So-young (South Korea) Gil Young-ah	8–15, 12–15	(silver) Runner-up

Mixed doubles
Year	Tournament	Partner	Opponent	Score	Result
1990	Thailand Open	(China) Zheng Yumin	(South Korea) Chung Myung-hee (South Korea) Park Joo-bong	3–15, 3–15	(silver) Runner-up

=== IBF International ===
Women's singles
Year	Tournament	Opponent	Score	Result
1986	Polish International	(Denmark) Pernille Nedergaard	11–3, 11–6	(gold) Winner

Women's doubles
Year	Tournament	Partner	Opponent	Score	Result
1986	Polish Open	(China) Shi Fangjing	(China) Li Feng (China) Lin Yanfen	15–3, 15–4	(gold) Winner
