= Jang Hye-ock =

South Korean badminton player

Personal information
- Born: 9 February 1977 (age 49) Jeonju, North Jeolla Province, South Korea
- Height: 1.60 m (5 ft 3 in)

Sport
- Country: South Korea
- Sport: Badminton
- Handedness: Right

Women's & mixed doubles
- Highest ranking: 1 (WD with Gil Young-ah August 1995)
- BWF profile
Medal record
Representing South Korea
Women's badminton
Olympic Games
Silver medal – second place	1996 Atlanta	Women's doubles
World Championships
Gold medal – first place	1995 Lausanne	Women's doubles
Sudirman Cup
Bronze medal – third place	1995 Lausanne	Mixed team
Uber Cup
Bronze medal – third place	1994 Jakarta	Women's team
Bronze medal – third place	1996 Hong Kong	Women's team
Bronze medal – third place	1998 Hong Kong	Women's team
Asian Games
Gold medal – first place	1994 Hiroshima	Women's doubles
Gold medal – first place	1994 Hiroshima	Women's team
Silver medal – second place	1994 Hiroshima	Mixed doubles
Asian Championships
Bronze medal – third place	1994 Shanghai	Women's doubles
Bronze medal – third place	1994 Shanghai	Mixed doubles
Asian Cup
Gold medal – first place	1994 Beijing	Women's doubles
Gold medal – first place	1996 Seoul	Women's doubles
Silver medal – second place	1995 Qingdao	Women's doubles
Bronze medal – third place	1994 Beijing	Mixed doubles

Jang Hye-ock (Korean: 장혜옥; Hanja: 張惠玉; born 9 February 1977) is a badminton player from South Korea who affiliate with Chungnam Provincial office team. She won the gold medal at the 1995 IBF World Championships in women's doubles, playing with Gil Young-ah. At 18 years, 3 months, and 19 days, she was the youngest player ever to win a World Championship title, in any discipline. The same year she won the 1995 All England Open Badminton Championships. She reached a career high as women's doubles world number 1 with Gil in August 1995. Jang competed at the 1996 Summer Olympics, and she won the silver medal in the women's doubles together with Gil Young-ah.

== Career ==
Jang Hye-ock entered the national team in 1993 when she was in the second grade of Seongshim Girls' High School. Although she has a small physique, Jang was excellent as a play-maker, supporting her power and spirit to compete. In February 1996, she undergo surgery for an enlarged rib and after recovered her injury, she competed at the 1996 Summer Olympics, won a silver medal in the women's doubles with Gil Young-ah.

In 1998, after playing two tournaments in Europe, she suffered a hip injury, and then she decided to leave the national team and the international tournaments. After her retirement, she keeps playing domestically for her local team and later for Jeonbuk Bank. She is now coaching in her alma mater, Seongshim Girls' High School. She did also coach the national junior team for about 3 years, back when Lee Yong-dae was on the team.

== Achievements ==
=== Olympic Games ===
Women's doubles
Year	Venue	Partner	Opponent	Score	Result
1996	GSU Sports Arena, Atlanta, United States	(South Korea) Gil Young-ah	(China) Ge Fei (China) Gu Jun	5–15, 5–15	Silver

=== World Championships ===
Women's doubles
Year	Venue	Partner	Opponent	Score	Result
1995	Malley Sports Centre, Lausanne, Switzerland	(South Korea) Gil Young-ah	(Indonesia) Finarsih (Indonesia) Lili Tampi	3–15, 15–11, 15–10	Gold

=== Asian Games ===
Women's doubles
Year	Venue	Partner	Opponent	Score	Result
1994	Tsuru Memorial Gymnasium, Hiroshima, Japan	(South Korea) Shim Eun-jung	(South Korea) Chung So-young (South Korea) Gil Young-ah	15–9, 15–3	Gold

Mixed doubles
Year	Venue	Partner	Opponent	Score	Result
1994	Tsuru Memorial Gymnasium, Hiroshima, Japan	(South Korea) Kang Kyung-jin	(South Korea) Yoo Yong-sung (South Korea) Chung So-young	10–15, 12–15	Silver

=== Asian Championships ===
Women's doubles
Year	Venue	Partner	Opponent	Score	Result
1994	Shanghai Gymnasium, Shanghai, China	(South Korea) Shim Eun-jung	(China) Ge Fei (China) Gu Jun	6–15, 8–15	Bronze

Mixed doubles
Year	Venue	Partner	Opponent	Score	Result
1994	Shanghai Gymnasium, Shanghai, China	(South Korea) Yoo Yong-sung	(China) Wang Xiaoyuan (China) Liu Jianjun	6–15, 15–6, 5–15	Bronze

=== Asian Cup ===
Women's doubles
Year	Venue	Partner	Opponent	Score	Result
1994	Beijing Gymnasium, Beijing, China	(South Korea) Chung So-young	(China) Chen Ying (China) Wu Yuhong	15–9, 15–5	Gold
1995	Qingdao, China	(South Korea) Gil Young-ah	(China) Ge Fei (China) Gu Jun	7–15, 17–18	Silver
1996	Olympic Gymnasium No. 2, Seoul, South Korea	(South Korea) Chung So-young	(Indonesia) Indarti Issolina (Indonesia) Deyana Lomban	15–7, 15–8	Gold

Mixed doubles
Year	Venue	Partner	Opponent	Score	Result
1994	Beijing Gymnasium, Beijing, China	(South Korea) Yoo Yong-sung	(Indonesia) Aryono Miranat (Indonesia) Eliza Nathanael	10–15, 16–18	Bronze

=== IBF World Grand Prix (11 titles, 9 runners-up) ===
The World Badminton Grand Prix sanctioned by International Badminton Federation (IBF) since 1983.

Women's doubles
Year	Tournament	Partner	Opponent	Score	Result
1994	Swedish Open	(South Korea) Shim Eun-jung	(South Korea) Chung So-young (South Korea) Gil Young-ah	9–15, 11–15	(silver) Runner-up
1994	All England Open	(South Korea) Shim Eun-jung	(South Korea) Chung So-young (South Korea) Gil Young-ah	15–7, 8–15, 4–15	(silver) Runner-up
1994	Hong Kong Open	(South Korea) Shim Eun-jung	(China) Ge Fei (China) Gu Jun	15–11, 18–14	(gold) Winner
1994	China Open	(South Korea) Bang Soo-hyun	(China) Ge Fei (China) Gu Jun	8–15, 2–15	(silver) Runner-up
1995	Korea Open	(South Korea) Gil Young-ah	(China) Ge Fei (China) Gu Jun	15–13, 1–15, 15–11	(gold) Winner
1995	All England Open	(South Korea) Gil Young-ah	(Indonesia) Eliza Nathanael (Indonesia) Zelin Resiana	15–6, 15–3	(gold) Winner
1995	Malaysia Open	(South Korea) Gil Young-ah	(England) Julie Bradbury (England) Joanne Wright	10–15, 11–15	(silver) Runner-up
1995	Singapore Open	(South Korea) Gil Young-ah	(China) Ge Fei (China) Gu Jun	12–15, 7–15	(silver) Runner-up
1995	U.S. Open	(South Korea) Gil Young-ah	(South Korea) Kim Mee-hyang (South Korea) Kim Shin-young	15–9, 15–4	(gold) Winner
1995	Canadian Open	(South Korea) Gil Young-ah	(China) Qin Yiyuan (China) Tang Yongshu	15–10, 15–4	(gold) Winner
1995	Hong Kong Open	(South Korea) Gil Young-ah	(England) Julie Bradbury (England) Joanne Wright	17–15, 15–5	(gold) Winner
1995	China Open	(South Korea) Gil Young-ah	(China) Ge Fei (China) Gu Jun	12–15, 15–10, 3–15	(silver) Runner-up
1995	Thailand Open	(South Korea) Gil Young-ah	(China) Ge Fei (China) Gu Jun	18–17, 15–6	(gold) Winner
1995	World Grand Prix Finals	(South Korea) Gil Young-ah	(China) Ge Fei (China) Gu Jun	7–15, 12–15	(silver) Runner-up
1996	Japan Open	(South Korea) Gil Young-ah	(China) Ge Fei (China) Gu Jun	15–5, 14–17, 15–10	(gold) Winner
1996	Korea Open	(South Korea) Gil Young-ah	(South Korea) Kim Mee-hyang (South Korea) Kim Shin-young	11–15, 15–11, 15–4	(gold) Winner
1998	Swedish Open	(South Korea) Ra Kyung-min	(China) Huang Nanyan (China) Liu Zhong	15–12, 15–9	(gold) Winner
1998	All England Open	(South Korea) Ra Kyung-min	(China) Ge Fei (China) Gu Jun	7–15, 7–15	(silver) Runner-up

Mixed doubles
Year	Tournament	Partner	Opponent	Score	Result
1993	China Open	(South Korea) Yoo Yong-sung	(China) Chen Xingdong (China) Sun Man	15–12, 9–15, 8–15	(silver) Runner-up
1994	Swedish Open	(South Korea) Yoo Yong-sung	(Netherlands) Ron Michels (Netherlands) Erica van den Heuvel	15–9, 10–15, 18–17	(gold) Winner
