= Kyoko Sasage =

Japanese badminton player

Personal information
- Country: Japan
- Born: 13 August 1969 (age 55)
Medal record
Women's badminton
Representing Japan
Uber Cup
| Bronze medal – third place | 1990 Nagoya & Tokyo | Women's team |
Asian Games
| Bronze medal – third place | 1994 Hiroshima | Women's doubles |
| Bronze medal – third place | 1990 Beijing | Women's team |
| Bronze medal – third place | 1994 Hiroshima | Women's team |

Kyoko Sasage (捧 匡子, Sasage Kyōko; born 13 August 1969) is a Japanese badminton player. She competed in women's doubles at the 1992 Summer Olympics in Barcelona.
