= Finarsih =

Indonesian badminton player (born 1972)

Personal information
- Born: Aadijatmiko Christina Finarsih; 8 February 1972 (age 54) Yogyakarta, Indonesia

Sport
- Country: Indonesia
- Sport: Badminton
- Handedness: Right

Women's & mixed doubles
- Highest ranking: 1 (1994)
- BWF profile
Medal record
Women's badminton
Representing Indonesia
World Championships
Silver medal – second place	1995 Lausanne	Women's doubles
World Cup
Gold medal – first place	1994 Ho Chi Minh	Women's doubles
Silver medal – second place	1995 Jakarta	Women's doubles
Bronze medal – third place	1993 New Delhi	Women's doubles
Bronze medal – third place	1997 Yogyakarta	Women's doubles
Uber Cup
Gold medal – first place	1994 Jakarta	Women's team
Gold medal – first place	1996 Hong Kong	Women's team
Silver medal – second place	1998 Hong Kong	Women's team
Bronze medal – third place	1992 Kuala Lumpur	Women's team
Sudirman Cup
Silver medal – second place	1991 Copenhagen	Mixed team
Silver medal – second place	1993 Birmingham	Mixed team
Silver medal – second place	1995 Lausanne	Mixed team
Asian Games
Silver medal – second place	1994 Hiroshima	Women's team
Asian Championships
Gold medal – first place	1996 Surabaya	Women's doubles
Bronze medal – third place	1997 Kuala Lumpur	Mixed doubles
Asian Cup
Bronze medal – third place	1994 Beijing	Women's doubles
Bronze medal – third place	1995 Qingdao	Women's doubles
Southeast Asian Games
Gold medal – first place	1991 Manila	Women's team
Gold medal – first place	1993 Singapore	Women's doubles
Gold medal – first place	1993 Singapore	Women's team
Gold medal – first place	1995 Chiang Mai	Women's doubles
Gold medal – first place	1995 Chiang Mai	Women's team
Silver medal – second place	1991 Manila	Women's doubles

Aadijatmiko Christina Finarsih (born 8 February 1972) is a retired badminton player from Indonesia who specialized in women's doubles.

== Career ==
Finarsih won a number of international titles during the 1990s, most of them with regular partner Lili Tampi. These included the Dutch Open (1993), the World Badminton Grand Prix (1993), the Indonesia Open (1993, 1994), the Chinese Taipei Open (1994), and the Badminton World Cup (1994). She also won the 1996 Asian Championships with another fellow countrywomen Eliza Nathanael. Finarsih and Tampi were silver medalists at the 1995 IBF World Championships in Lausanne, Switzerland. They were eliminated in the quarterfinals of the 1992 Olympics in Barcelona, Spain, and in the round of sixteen at the 1996 Olympics in Atlanta, Georgia, USA.

== Achievements ==
=== World Championships ===
Women's doubles
Year	Venue	Partner	Opponent	Score	Result
1995	Malley Sports Centre, Lausanne, Switzerland	(Indonesia) Lili Tampi	(South Korea) Jang Hye-ock (South Korea) Gil Young-ah	15–3, 11–15, 10–15	Silver

=== World Cup ===
Women's doubles
Year	Venue	Partner	Opponent	Score	Result
1993	Indira Gandhi Arena; New Delhi, India	(Indonesia) Lili Tampi	(Sweden) Lim Xiaoqing (Sweden) Christine Magnusson	10–15, 3–15	Bronze
1994	Phan Đình Phùng Indoor Stadium; Ho Chi Minh, Vietnam	(Indonesia) Lili Tampi	(South Korea) Chung So-young (South Korea) Gil Young-ah	15–11, 15–12	Gold
1995	Istora Senayan; Jakarta, Indonesia	(Indonesia) Lili Tampi	(Indonesia) Eliza Nathanael (Indonesia) Zelin Resiana	15–10, 11–15, 11–10 retired	Silver
1997	Among Rogo Sports Hall; Yogyakarta, Indonesia	(Indonesia) Indarti Issolina	(China) Qin Yiyuan (China) Tang Yongshu	4–15, 9–15	Bronze

=== Asian Championships ===
Women's doubles
Year	Venue	Partner	Opponent	Score	Result
1996	GOR Pancasila; Surabaya, Indonesia	(Indonesia) Eliza Nathanael	(Indonesia) Indarti Issolina (Indonesia) Deyana Lomban	15–8, 15–6	Gold

Mixed doubles
Year	Venue	Partner	Opponent	Score	Result
1997	Stadium Negara; Kuala Lumpur, Malaysia	(Indonesia) Sandiarto	(China) Zhang Jun (China) Liu Lu	3–15, 15–2, 4–15	Bronze

=== Asian Cup ===
Women's doubles
Year	Venue	Partner	Opponent	Score	Result
1994	Beijing Gymnasium, Beijing, China	(Indonesia) Zelin Resiana	(China) Chen Ying (China) Wu Yuhong	–, –	Bronze
1995	Xinxing Gymnasium, Qingdao, China	(Indonesia) Lili Tampi	(South Korea) Gil Young-ah (South Korea) Jang Hye-ock	6–15, 15–8, 7–15	Bronze

=== Southeast Asian Games ===
Women's doubles
Year	Venue	Partner	Opponent	Score	Result
1991	Camp Crame Gymnasium; Manila, Philippines	(Indonesia) Lili Tampi	(Indonesia) Erma Sulistianingsih (Indonesia) Rosiana Tendean	10–15, 10–15	Silver
1993	Singapore Badminton Hall; Singapore	(Indonesia) Lili Tampi	(Indonesia) Eliza Nathanael (Indonesia) Zelin Resiana	15–5, 6–15, 15–5	Gold
1995	Gymnasium 3, 700th Anniversary Sport Complex; Chiang Mai, Thailand	(Indonesia) Lili Tampi	(Indonesia) Eliza Nathanael (Indonesia) Zelin Resiana	15–7, 15–3	Gold

=== World Junior Championships ===
The Bimantara World Junior Championships was an international invitation badminton tournament for junior players. It was held in Jakarta, Indonesia from 1987 to 1991.

Girls' doubles
Year	Venue	Partner	Opponent	Score	Result
1989	Jakarta, Indonesia	(Indonesia) Eliza Nathanael	(South Korea) Shon Hye-joo (South Korea) Jung Eun-hwa	0–15, 17–16, 15–12	Gold

=== IBF World Grand Prix ===
The World Badminton Grand Prix has been sanctioned by the International Badminton Federation from 1983 to 2006.

Women's doubles
Year	Tournament	Partner	Opponent	Score	Result
1991	Denmark Open	(Indonesia) Lili Tampi	(England) Gillian Gowers (Denmark) Nettie Nielsen	7–15, 6–15	(silver) Runner-up
1993	Japan Open	(Indonesia) Lili Tampi	(South Korea) Chung So-young (South Korea) Gil Young-ah	12–15, 5–15	(silver) Runner-up
1993	Indonesia Open	(Indonesia) Lili Tampi	(Indonesia) Eliza Nathanael (Indonesia) Zelin Resiana	17–16, 15–12	(gold) Winner
1993	German Open	(Indonesia) Lili Tampi	(China) Chen Ying (China) Wu Yuhong	15–3, 15–10	(gold) Winner
1993	Dutch Open	(Indonesia) Lili Tampi	(England) Joanne Goode (China) Zhang Ning	15–9, 15–3	(gold) Winner
1993	World Grand Prix Finals	(Indonesia) Lili Tampi	(Indonesia) Eliza Nathanael (Indonesia) Rosiana Tendean	15–11, 15–10	(gold) Winner
1994	Chinese Taipei Open	(Indonesia) Lili Tampi	(Denmark) Lotte Olsen (Denmark) Lisbet Stuer-Lauridsen	15–9, 15–4	(gold) Winner
1994	Japan Open	(Indonesia) Lili Tampi	(South Korea) Chung So-young (South Korea) Gil Young-ah	11–15, 11–15	(silver) Runner-up
1994	Indonesia Open	(Indonesia) Lili Tampi	(South Korea) Chung So-young (South Korea) Gil Young-ah	10–15, 15–9, 15–5	(gold) Winner
1994	World Grand Prix Finals	(Indonesia) Lili Tampi	(China) Ge Fei (China) Gu Jun	15–13, 8–15, 7–15	(silver) Runner-up
1995	Japan Open	(Indonesia) Lili Tampi	(China) Ge Fei (China) Gu Jun	11–15, 8–15	(silver) Runner-up
1997	Indonesia Open	(Indonesia) Minarti Timur	(Indonesia) Eliza Nathanael (Indonesia) Zelin Resiana	10–15, 5–15	(silver) Runner-up

Mixed doubles
Year	Tournament	Partner	Opponent	Score	Result
1996	Vietnam Open	(Indonesia) Sandiarto	(China) Liu Yong (China) Zhang Jin	5–15, 6–15	(silver) Runner-up
1997	Chinese Taipei Open	(Indonesia) Sandiarto	(South Korea) Lee Dong-soo (South Korea) Park Soo-yun	15–11, 15–8	(gold) Winner

IBF Grand Prix tournament
IBF Grand Prix Finals tournament
