= Kang Kyung-jin =

South Korean badminton player

Personal information
- Born: 24 March 1973 (age 53)
- Height: 1.74 m (5 ft 9 in)
- Weight: 68 kg (150 lb)

Sport
- Country: South Korea
- Sport: Badminton
- Handedness: Left
- Event: Men's & mixed doubles

Men's & mixed doubles
- BWF profile
Medal record
Representing South Korea
Men's badminton
World Championships
Bronze medal – third place	1991 Copenhagen	Mixed doubles
Sudirman Cup
Gold medal – first place	1991 Copenhagen	Mixed team
Gold medal – first place	1993 Birmingham	Mixed team
Silver medal – second place	1997 Glasgow	Mixed team
Bronze medal – third place	1995 Lausanne	Mixed team
Thomas Cup
Bronze medal – third place	1996 Hong Kong	Men's team
Asian Games
Silver medal – second place	1994 Hiroshima	Mixed doubles
Silver medal – second place	1994 Hiroshima	Men's team
Bronze medal – third place	1998 Bangkok	Men's team
Asian Championships
Gold medal – first place	1998 Bangkok	Men's doubles
Silver medal – second place	1996 Surabaya	Men's doubles
Silver medal – second place	1996 Surabaya	Mixed doubles
Asian Cup
Silver medal – second place	1996 Seoul	Mixed doubles
East Asian Games
Bronze medal – third place	1993 Shanghai	Men's doubles
Bronze medal – third place	1993 Shanghai	Men's team

Kang Kyung-jin (Korean: 강경진; Hanja: 姜京珍; born 24 March 1973) is a former badminton player and coach from South Korea. He was the men's doubles champion at the 1997 All England Open and 1998 Asian Championships. He competed at the 1996 Summer Olympics.

== Early life ==
The left-handler Kang Kyung-jin, began to play badminton when he was in the third grade of Dongdaegu Elementary School, recognized by his teacher who is also a badminton coach in a club. In the beginning, he wanted to be a baseball player, following his father, who was also a baseball player.

== Career ==
As a player, Kang was best known for winning the 1997 All England Open men's doubles title with Ha Tae-kwon. In the same year, Kang and Ha also won major titles at the Swedish Open and the Korea Open and the following year, they won the Badminton Asia Championships. In the 1994 Asian Games, he won two silver medals, in mixed doubles and in the men's team event.

=== Coach ===
Kang graduated from Inha University, and after that he started his career as a coach in Gangnam-gu office team. He later was selected to join the national team as men's doubles coach in 2003, and took part at the Summer Olympics from 2004–2016, with his best achievements was managed to lead Ha Tae-kwon and Kim Dong-moon to win a gold medal in 2004. He spent one year as the head coach of the national junior team, and then Kang was named as the head coach of the senior national team in December 2016, with his term to run from 1 January 2017 to 30 October 2018. Following the Korean team's disappointing results at the 2018 Asian Games, Kang with some of Korean coaching staff were fired by the Badminton Korea Association (BKA). In September 2019, he was hired to join Chinese national team coaching staff, and made history in China badminton as the first foreign coach on their team.

== Personal life ==
Kang's wife, Park Soo-yun, is also a former badminton player.

== Achievements ==
=== World Championships ===
Mixed doubles
Year	Venue	Partner	Opponent	Score	Result
1991	Brøndby Arena, Copenhagen, Denmark	(South Korea) Shim Eun-jung	(Denmark) Thomas Lund (Denmark) Pernille Dupont	7–15, 17–15, 7–15	Bronze

=== Asian Games ===
Mixed doubles
Year	Venue	Partner	Opponent	Score	Result
1994	Tsuru Memorial Gymnasium, Hiroshima, Japan	(South Korea) Jang Hye-ock	(South Korea) Yoo Yong-sung (South Korea) Chung So-young	10–15, 12–15	Silver

=== Asian Championships ===
Men's doubles
Year	Venue	Partner	Opponent	Score	Result
1996	Pancasila Hall, Surabaya, Indonesia	(South Korea) Ha Tae-kwon	(Indonesia) Ade Sutrisna (Indonesia) Candra Wijaya	8–15, 17–15, 11–15	Silver
1998	Nimibutr Stadium, Bangkok, Thailand	(South Korea) Ha Tae-kwon	(China) Zhang Jun (China) Zhang Wei	12–15, 15–11, 15–13	Gold

Mixed doubles
Year	Venue	Partner	Opponent	Score	Result
1996	Pancasila Hall, Surabaya, Indonesia	(South Korea) Kim Mee-hyang	(Indonesia) Tri Kusharjanto (Indonesia) Lili Tampi	1–15, 6–15	Silver

=== Asian Cup ===
Mixed doubles
Year	Venue	Partner	Opponent	Score	Result
1996	Olympic Gymnasium No. 2, Seoul, South Korea	(South Korea) Kim Mee-hyang	(South Korea) Park Joo-bong (South Korea) Ra Kyung-min	6–15, 8–15	Silver

=== East Asian Games ===
Men's doubles
Year	Venue	Partner	Opponent	Score	Result
1993	Shanghai, China	(South Korea) Kim Chul-joong	(China) Huang Zhanzhong (China) Liu Di	5–15, 15–6, 7–15	Bronze

=== IBF World Grand Prix ===
The World Badminton Grand Prix sanctioned by International Badminton Federation (IBF) since 1983.

Men's doubles
Year	Tournament	Partner	Opponent	Score	Result
1995	Swedish Open	(South Korea) Kim Dong-moon	(Sweden) Peter Axelsson (Sweden) Pär-Gunnar Jönsson	5–15, 9–15	(silver) Runner-up
1995	Canadian Open	(South Korea) Ha Tae-kwon	(South Korea) Kim Dong-moon (South Korea) Yoo Yong-sung	12–15, 15–6, 15–8	(gold) Winner
1995	Hong Kong Open	(South Korea) Ha Tae-kwon	(Indonesia) Rudy Gunawan (Indonesia) Bambang Suprianto	17–15, 12–15, 15–3	(gold) Winner
1996	Thailand Open	(South Korea) Ha Tae-kwon	(Indonesia) Sigit Budiarto (Indonesia) Candra Wijaya	11–15, 15–10, 12–15	(silver) Runner-up
1997	Korea Open	(South Korea) Ha Tae-kwon	(Malaysia) Cheah Soon Kit (Malaysia) Yap Kim Hock	4–15, 15–3, 15–5	(gold) Winner
1997	Swedish Open	(South Korea) Ha Tae-kwon	(Sweden) Peter Axelsson (Sweden) Pär-Gunnar Jönsson	15–3, 15–11	(gold) Winner
1997	All England Open	(South Korea) Ha Tae-kwon	(Denmark) Jon Holst-Christensen (Denmark) Michael Søgaard	15–11, 17–16	(gold) Winner
2001	U.S. Open	(South Korea) Park Young-duk	(Japan) Yousuke Nakanishi (Japan) Shinya Ohtsuka	7–0, 7–3, 7–3	(gold) Winner

Mixed doubles
Year	Tournament	Partner	Opponent	Score	Result
1995	Canadian Open	(South Korea) Kim Mee-hyang	(South Korea) Kim Dong-moon (South Korea) Gil Young-ah	7–15, 8–15	(silver) Runner-up

=== IBF International ===
Men's doubles
Year	Tournament	Partner	Opponent	Score	Result
2005	Canadian International	(South Korea) Han Sung-wook	(South Korea) Jung Sung-gyun (South Korea) Park Young-sang	15–12, 15–13	(gold) Winner

Men's doubles
Year	Tournament	Partner	Opponent	Score	Result
2005	Canadian International	(South Korea) Ha Jung-eun	(South Korea) Han Sung-wook (South Korea) Joo Hyun-hee	15–12, 15–13	(gold) Winner
