= Chen Gang (badminton) =

Chinese badminton player (born 1976)

Chen Gang 陈刚
Personal information
- Born: 27 June 1976 (age 50) Hangzhou, Zhejiang, China
- Height: 1.80 m (5 ft 11 in)
- Weight: 75 kg (165 lb)

Sport
- Country: China
- Sport: Badminton
- Handedness: Right

Men's singles & doubles
- Highest ranking: 3
- BWF profile
Medal record
Men's badminton
Representing China
World Cup
Bronze medal – third place	1995 Jakarta	Men's singles
Thomas Cup
Bronze medal – third place	1998 Hong Kong	Men's team
Asian Games
Silver medal – second place	1998 Bangkok	Men's team
Asian Championships
Gold medal – first place	1998 Bangkok	Men's singles
Bronze medal – third place	1998 Bangkok	Mixed doubles
World Junior Championships
Gold medal – first place	1996 Kuala Lumpur	Boys' singles

Chen Gang (Chinese: 陈刚; born 27 June 1976) was a former Chinese badminton player from Zhejiang. He started his career in badminton at the age of eight. In 1989, Chen entered the Zhejiang team, and was selected to join the national team in 1994. He was a former World Junior Champion in the boys' singles event in 1994, and Asian Champion in the men's singles event in 1998.

In 2007, he went to South Korea as an assistant to singles coach Li Mao. In November 2008, he joined as a coach in Polish national team until September 2009. In July 2018, he moved to France as a national singles coach.

== Achievements ==
=== World Cup ===
Men's singles
Year	Venue	Opponent	Score	Result
1995	Jakarta, Indonesia	(Indonesia) Joko Suprianto	2–15, 7–15	Bronze

=== Asian Championships ===
Men's singles
Year	Venue	Opponent	Score	Result
1998	Bangkok, Thailand	(Indonesia) Marleve Mainaky	15–6, 15–9	Gold

Mixed doubles
Year	Venue	Partner	Opponent	Score	Result
1998	Bangkok, Thailand	(China) Tang Yongshu	(South Korea) Kim Dong-moon (South Korea) Ra Kyung-min	1–15, 10–15	Bronze

=== World Junior Championships ===
Boys' singles
Year	Venue	Opponent	Score	Result
1994	Kuala Lumpur Badminton Stadium, Kuala Lumpur, Malaysia	(China) Zheng Qiang	15–9, 15–3	Gold

=== IBF World Grand Prix ===
The World Badminton Grand Prix sanctioned by International Badminton Federation (IBF) since 1983.

Men's singles
Year	Tournament	Opponent	Score	Result
1999	Thailand Open	(China) Ji Xinpeng	15–12, 15–6	(gold) Winner
1998	Hong Kong Open	(Indonesia) Budi Santoso	10–15, 10–15	(silver) Runner-up
1998	Swedish Open	(China) Luo Yigang	14–18, 2–15	(silver) Runner-up
1997	Vietnam Open	(Indonesia) Alan Budikusuma	15–6, 9–15, 15–3	(gold) Winner
1997	Thailand Open	(Indonesia) Hendrawan	9–15, 1–15	(silver) Runner-up
1994	Russian Open	(China) Yu Jinhao	18–13, 18–13	(gold) Winner

Mixed doubles
Year	Tournament	Partner	Opponent	Score	Result
1998	Swedish Open	(China) Tang Yongshu	(South Korea) Kim Dong-moon (South Korea) Ra Kyung-min	3–15, 3–15	(silver) Runner-up

=== IBF International ===
Men's singles
Year	Tournament	Opponent	Score	Result
2002	BMW International	(Denmark) Niels Christian Kaldau	15–7, 8–15, 17–14	(gold) Winner
1999	French Open	(India) Pullela Gopichand	15–8, 10–15, 15–10	(gold) Winner

Mixed doubles
Year	Tournament	Partner	Opponent	Score	Result
1999	French Open	(China) Qin Yiyuan	(England) Ian Sullivan (England) Gail Emms	15–12, 15–12	(gold) Winner
