= Ade Sutrisna =

Indonesian badminton player

Personal information
- Born: 9 March 1974
- Died: 15 November 2016 (aged 42)

Sport
- Country: Indonesia
- Sport: Badminton
- Event: Men's doubles

Men's doubles
- BWF profile
Medal record
Men's badminton
Representing Indonesia
Asian Championships
Gold medal – first place	1996 Surabaya	Men's doubles
Bronze medal – third place	1995 Beijing	Men's doubles
Asian Cup
Bronze medal – third place	1995 Qingdao	Men's doubles
Bronze medal – third place	1996 Seoul	Men's doubles

Ade Sutrisna (9 March 1974 – 15 November 2016) was an Indonesian badminton player.

Sutrisna won four medals at the Asian Championships and Asian Cup combined, which includes the gold medal from 1996 Asian Championships with Chandra Wijaya. During most of his career, he partnered with Wijaya and won titles in the United States, Canada, Malaysia, Poland, India, and Sweden, four of them at the Grand Prix level. He died of kidney failure at the age of 42 in 2016.

== Achievements ==
=== Asian Championships ===
Men's doubles
Year	Venue	Partner	Opponent	Score	Result
1995	Olympic Sports Center Gymnasium, Beijing, China	(Indonesia) Candra Wijaya	(Malaysia) Cheah Soon Kit (Malaysia) Yap Kim Hock	6–15, 8–15	Bronze
1996	GOR Pancasila Hall, Surabaya, Indonesia	(Indonesia) Candra Wijaya	(South Korea) Ha Tae-kwon (South Korea) Kang Kyung-jin	15–8, 15–17, 15–11	Gold

=== Asian Cup ===
Men's doubles
Year	Venue	Partner	Opponent	Score	Result
1995	Xinxing Gymnasium, Qingdao, China	(Indonesia) Candra Wijaya	(China) Huang Zhanzhong (China) Jiang Xin		Bronze
1996	Olympic Gymnasium No. 2 Seoul, South Korea	(Indonesia) Candra Wijaya	(South Korea) Kim Dong-moon (South Korea) Yoo Yong-sung	11–15, 6–15	Bronze

=== World Junior Championships ===
The Bimantara World Junior Championships was an international invitation badminton tournament for junior players. It was held in Jakarta, Indonesia from 1987 to 1991.

Boys' doubles
Year	Venue	Partner	Opponent	Score	Result
1990	Jakarta, Indonesia	(Indonesia) Toni Johannes	(Indonesia) Seng Kok Kiong (Indonesia) Hadi Sugianto	15–9, 4–15, 7–15	Silver

=== IBF World Grand Prix ===
The World Badminton Grand Prix sanctioned by International Badminton Federation (IBF) from 1983 to 2006.

Men's doubles
Year	Tournament	Partner	Opponent	Score	Result
1994	Canada Open	(Indonesia) Candra Wijaya	(Malaysia) Yap Yee Guan (Malaysia) Yap Yee Hup	15–10, 15–12	(gold) Winner
1994	U.S. Open	(Indonesia) Candra Wijaya	(Malaysia) Yap Yee Guan (Malaysia) Yap Yee Hup	15–8, 15–14	(gold) Winner
1995	German Open	(Indonesia) Candra Wijaya	(Denmark) Jon Holst-Christensen (Denmark) Thomas Lund	8–15, 13–15	(silver) Runner-up
1996	Swedish Open	(Indonesia) Candra Wijaya	(Indonesia) Sigit Budiarto (Indonesia) Dicky Purwotjugiono	15–12, 15–6	(gold) Winner
1997	India Open	(Indonesia) Ade Lukas	(Indonesia) Aras Razak (Indonesia) Hadi Sugianto	15–5, 15–12	(gold) Winner

=== IBF International ===
Men's doubles
Year	Tournament	Partner	Opponent	Score	Result
1994	Polish Open	(Indonesia) Candra Wijaya	(Denmark) Kenneth Jonassen (Denmark) Jan Jørgensen	11–15, 15–8, 15–8	(gold) Winner
1997	Malaysia International	(Indonesia) Ade Lukas	(Malaysia) Khoo Boo Hock (Malaysia) Pang Cheh Chang	15–5, 15–2	(gold) Winner
