= Badminton at the 1998 Asian Games – Men's team =

Men's team at the 1998 Asian Games
- Venue: Thammasat Gymnasium 2
- Dates: 8–11 December 1998
- Nations: 9

Medalists
gold medal	Indonesia; Tony Gunawan, Hendrawan, Taufik Hidayat, Tri Kusharjanto, Rexy Mainaky, Budi Santoso, Ricky Subagja, Candra Wijaya
silver medal	China; Chen Gang, Dong Jiong, Liu Yong, Luo Yigang, Sun Jun, Yu Jinhao, Zhang Jun, Zhang Wei
bronze medal	South Korea; Ahn Jae-chang, Ha Tae-kwon, Hwang Sun-ho, Kang Kyung-jin, Kim Dong-moon, Lee Dong-soo, Park Sung-woo, Yoo Yong-sung
bronze medal	Malaysia; Chan Chong Ming, Cheah Soon Thoe, James Chua, Jeremy Gan, Roslin Hashim, Pang Cheh Chang, Wong Choong Hann, Yong Hock Kin

The Badminton men's team event at the 1998 Asian Games was scheduled from 8–11 December 1998 at Thamassat University Sports Complex, Bangkok, Thailand.

Defending champion, Indonesia successfully retained their gold medal after defeating China 4 - 0 in the final. It was in this event, the Indonesian team had introduced their future star, The Enigma Taufik Hidayat for the first time. Being just at 17, Hidayat clinched the winning point in the 2nd singles match to earn Indonesia the gold medal. Below are the summaries and results for the Semifinals and Final matches of the event.

== Schedule ==
All times are Indochina Time (UTC+07:00)

Date	Time	Event
Tuesday, 8 December 1998	13:00	1st round
Tuesday, 8 December 1998	13:00	Quarterfinals
Wednesday, 9 December 1998	13:00	Quarterfinals
Thursday, 10 December 1998	13:00	Semifinals
Friday, 11 December 1998	13:00	Final

== Results ==
1st round
Iran	0
Hong Kong	5

Quarterfinals
1	China	5
Japan	0
4	South Korea	4
Thailand	1
Hong Kong	0
3	Indonesia	5
Chinese Taipei	1
2	Malaysia	4

Semifinals
1	China	3
4	South Korea	2
3	Indonesia	4
2	Malaysia	1

Final
1	China	0
3	Indonesia	4

=== 1st round ===
8 December	Iran	0–5	Hong Kong

=== Quarterfinals ===
8 December	China	5–0	Japan

Sun Jun	2–0	Shinji Ota	15–2, 15–5
Zhang Jun / Zhang Wei	2–0	Fumihiko Machida / Seiichi Watanabe	15–9, 15–5
Dong Jiong	2–0	Kazuhiro Shimogami	15–3, 15–8
Liu Yong / Yu Jinhao	2–0	Shinji Ota / Hidetaka Yamada	15–2, 15–3
Chen Gang	2–0	Hidetaka Yamada	15–5, 15–3

8 December	South Korea	4–1	Thailand

9 December	Hong Kong	0–5	Indonesia

Tam Kai Chuen	1–2	Hendrawan	15–13, 4–15, 1–15
Chow Kin Man / Yau Kwun Yuen	0–2	Candra Wijaya / Tony Gunawan	6–15, 1–15
Liu Kwok Wa	1–2	Taufik Hidayat	5–15, 15–11, 6–15
Ma Che Kong / Liu Kwok Wa	0–2	Ricky Subagja / Rexy Mainaky	5–15, 7–15
Ng Wei	0–2	Budi Santoso	7–15, 5–15

9 December	Chinese Taipei	1–4	Malaysia

Chen Feng	0–2	Yong Hock Kin	13–15, 11–15
Horng Shin-jeng / Lee Wei-jen	2–1	Pang Cheh Chang / Cheah Soon Thoe	15–10, 5–15, 12–15
Lee Mou-chou	0–2	Roslin Hashim	7–15, 9–15
Lee Sung-yuan / Lin Wei-hsiang	0–2	Chan Chong Ming / Jeremy Gan	14–17, 6–15
Chien Yu-hsiu	0–2	Wong Choong Hann	10–15, 9–15

=== Semifinals ===
10 December	China	3–2	South Korea

Sun Jun	2–0	Hwang Sun-ho	15–6, 15–10
Zhang Jun / Zhang Wei	2–1	Lee Dong-soo / Yoo Yong-sung	15–6, 11–15, 15–13
Luo Yigang	2–0	Ahn Jae-chang	15–11, 15–9
Liu Yong / Yu Jinhao	1–2	Ha Tae-kwon / Kang Kyung-jin
Dong Jiong	0–2	Park Sung-woo

10 December	Indonesia	4–1	Malaysia

Hendrawan	2–0	Yong Hock Kin	15–4, 15–7
Ricky Subagja / Rexy Mainaky	2–0	Pang Cheh Chang / Cheah Soon Thoe	15–5, 15–5
Taufik Hidayat	0–2	Roslin Hashim	10–15, 14–17
Candra Wijaya / Tony Gunawan	2–0	Chan Chong Ming / Jeremy Gan	15–5, 15–4
Budi Santoso	2–0	Wong Choong Hann	15–9, 15–9

=== Final ===
11 December	China	0–4	Indonesia

Sun Jun	0–2	Hendrawan	7–15, 6–15
Zhang Jun / Zhang Wei	0–2	Ricky Subagja / Rexy Mainaky	11–15, 8–15
Luo Yigang	0–2	Taufik Hidayat	6–15, 5–15
Liu Yong / Yu Jinhao	0–2	Candra Wijaya / Tony Gunawan	0–15, 11–15
