= Badminton at the 1993 East Asian Games =

Badminton tournament

1993 East Asian Games
Tournament details
- Dates: 9 – 18 May
- Edition: 1st
- Location: Shanghai, China

The Badminton tournament at the 1993 East Asian Games was held at Shanghai, China from 9 to 18 May. It was the first time badminton was included in the East Asian Games competition. Competitions for five individual disciplines as well as for teams were conducted. In individual competition, China dominated by winning four out of five gold medals while South Korea won a single gold in the women's doubles discipline. In team competition, Chinese team secured both the Gold medals in the men's and women's events.

== Medal summary ==
=== Medal table ===
* Host nation (China)

Rank	Nation	Gold	Silver	Bronze	Total
1	China (CHN)*	6	4	4	14
2	South Korea	1	2	4	7
3	Chinese Taipei (TPE)	0	1	1	2
4	Hong Kong	0	0	3	3
5	Japan	0	0	2	2
Totals (5 entries)		7	7	14	28

=== Medalists ===
Discipline	Gold	Silver	Bronze
Men's singles	(China) Liu Jun	(South Korea) Lee Gwang-jin	(China) Dong Jiong
Men's singles	(China) Liu Jun	(South Korea) Lee Gwang-jin	(China) Hu Zhilan
Women's singles	(China) Shen Lianfeng	(China) Lin Xiaoming	(South Korea) Kim Ji-hyun
Women's singles	(China) Shen Lianfeng	(China) Lin Xiaoming	(China) Zhang Ning
Men's doubles	(China) Jiang Xin (China) Yu Qi	(China) Huang Zhanzhong (China) Liu Di	(Chinese Taipei) Ger Shin-ming (Chinese Taipei) Yang Shih-jeng
Men's doubles	(China) Jiang Xin (China) Yu Qi	(China) Huang Zhanzhong (China) Liu Di	(South Korea) Kang Kyung-jin (South Korea) Kim Chul-joong
Women's doubles	(South Korea) Kim Shin-young (South Korea) Shon Hye-joo	(China) Qin Yiyuan (China) Zhang Ning	(Japan) Aiko Miyamura (Japan) Hisako Mizui
Women's doubles	(South Korea) Kim Shin-young (South Korea) Shon Hye-joo	(China) Qin Yiyuan (China) Zhang Ning	(China) Guo Jing (China) Lin Xiaoming
Mixed doubles	(China) Chen Xingdong (China) Sun Man	(China) Liang Qing (China) Peng Yun	(Hong Kong) Chan Siu Kwong (Hong Kong) Chung Hoi Yuk
Mixed doubles	(China) Chen Xingdong (China) Sun Man	(China) Liang Qing (China) Peng Yun	(South Korea) Chung Kwon (South Korea) Kim Mee-hyang
Men's team	China	Chinese Taipei	Hong Kong
Men's team	China	Chinese Taipei	South Korea
Women's team	China	South Korea	Hong Kong
Women's team	China	South Korea	Japan

== Results ==
=== Men's singles ===
Semifinal
(China) Liu Jun	15	15
(China) Dong Jiong	8	1
(China) Hu Zhilan	5	8
(South Korea) Lee Gwang-jin	15	15

Final
(China) Liu Jun	15	15
(South Korea) Lee Gwang-jin	9	9

=== Women's singles ===
Semifinal
(South Korea) Kim Ji-hyun	11	11	1
(China) Lin Xiaoming	8	12	11
(China) Zhang Ning	8	8
(China) Shen Lianfeng	11	11

Final
(China) Lin Xiaoming	3	7
(China) Shen Lianfeng	11	11

=== Men's doubles ===
Semi-finals
(China) Jiang Xin (China) Yu Qi	15	15
(Chinese Taipei) Ger Shin-ming (Chinese Taipei) Yang Shih-jeng	11	6
(China) Huang Zhanzhong (China) Liu Di	15	6	15
(South Korea) Kang Kyung-jin (South Korea) Kim Chul-joong	5	15	7

Final
(China) Jiang Xin (China) Yu Qi	15	18
(China) Huang Zhanzhong (China) Liu Di	12	15

=== Women's doubles ===
Semi-finals
(South Korea) Kim Shin-young (South Korea) Shon Hye-joo	13	15	15
(Japan) Aiko Miyamura (Japan) Hisako Mizui	18	7	5
(China) Guo Jing (China) Lin Xiaoming	13	9
(China) Qin Yiyuan (China) Zhang Ning	15	15

Final
(South Korea) Kim Shin-young (South Korea) Shon Hye-joo	15	15
(China) Qin Yiyuan (China) Zhang Ning	12	11

=== Mixed doubles ===
Semi-finals
(China) Chen Xingdong (China) Sun Man	15	15
(South Korea) Chung Kwon (South Korea) Kim Mee-hyang	7	5
(China) Liang Qing (China) Peng Yun	15	15
(Hong Kong) Chan Siu Kwong (Hong Kong) Chung Hoi Yuk	12	11

Final
(China) Chen Xingdong (China) Sun Man	15	15
(China) Liang Qing (China) Peng Yun	3	13
