= 1996 Badminton Asian Cup =

Badminton championships

1996 Asian Cup
Tournament details
- Dates: 19 – 23 June
- Edition: 4th
- Total prize money: US$130,000
- Venue: Olympic Gymnasium No. 2
- Location: Seoul, South Korea

The 1996 Badminton Asian Cup was the fourth edition of Badminton Asian Cup. It was held in Seoul, South Korea from 19 to 23 June with total prize money of US$130,000. Host South Korea dominated by winning all the doubles disciplines, while singles titles were shared between China and Malaysia.

== Medalists ==
| Event | Gold | Silver | Bronze |
|---|---|---|---|
| Men's singles | (Malaysia) Rashid Sidek | (China) Luo Yigang | (China) Xie Yangchun |
| Men's singles | (Malaysia) Rashid Sidek | (China) Luo Yigang | (Malaysia) Ong Ewe Hock |
| Women's singles | (China) Zhang Ning | (China) Zeng Yaqiong | (Thailand) Somharuthai Jaroensiri |
| Women's singles | (China) Zhang Ning | (China) Zeng Yaqiong | (Indonesia) Lidya Djaelawijaya |
| Men's doubles | (South Korea) Kim Dong-moon (South Korea) Yoo Yong-sung | (Indonesia) Tony Gunawan (Indonesia) Rudy Wijaya | (Indonesia) Ade Sutrisna (Indonesia) Candra Wijaya |
| Men's doubles | (South Korea) Kim Dong-moon (South Korea) Yoo Yong-sung | (Indonesia) Tony Gunawan (Indonesia) Rudy Wijaya | (China) Liu Yong (China) Zhang Wei |
| Women's doubles | (South Korea) Chung So-young (South Korea) Jang Hye-ock | (Indonesia) Indarti Issolina (Indonesia) Deyana Lomban | (Japan) Tomomi Matsuo (Japan) Masako Sakamoto |
| Women's doubles | (South Korea) Chung So-young (South Korea) Jang Hye-ock | (Indonesia) Indarti Issolina (Indonesia) Deyana Lomban | (China) Gao Qian (China) Zhang Jin |
| Mixed doubles | (South Korea) Park Joo-bong (South Korea) Ra Kyung-min | (South Korea) Kang Kyung-jin (South Korea) Kim Mee-hyang | (China) Liu Yong (China) Gao Qian |
| Mixed doubles | (South Korea) Park Joo-bong (South Korea) Ra Kyung-min | (South Korea) Kang Kyung-jin (South Korea) Kim Mee-hyang | (Indonesia) Sandiarto (Indonesia) Indarti Issolina |

=== Medal table ===
| Rank | Nation | Gold | Silver | Bronze | Total |
|---|---|---|---|---|---|
| 1 | South Korea | 3 | 1 | 0 | 4 |
| 2 | China (CHN) | 1 | 2 | 4 | 7 |
| 3 | Malaysia (MAS) | 1 | 0 | 1 | 2 |
| 4 | Indonesia (INA) | 0 | 2 | 3 | 5 |
| 5 | Japan | 0 | 0 | 1 | 1 |
| 5 | Thailand (THA) | 0 | 0 | 1 | 1 |
| Totals (6 entries) | | 5 | 5 | 10 | 20 |

== Results ==
=== Semifinals ===
| Discipline | Winner | Runner-up | Score |
|---|---|---|---|
| Men's singles | (Malaysia) Rashid Sidek | (China) Xie Yangchun | 15–2, 15–11 |
| Men's singles | (China) Luo Yigang | (Malaysia) Ong Ewe Hock | 15–12, 18–13 |
| Women's singles | (China) Zhang Ning | (Thailand) Somharuthai Jaroensiri | 11–2, 11–4 |
| Women's singles | (China) Zeng Yaqiong | (Indonesia) Lidya Djaelawijaya | 11–4, 11–0 |
| Men's doubles | (South Korea) Kim Dong-moon (South Korea) Yoo Yong-sung | (Indonesia) Candra Wijaya (Indonesia) Ade Sutrisna | 15–11, 15–6 |
| Men's doubles | (Indonesia) Tony Gunawan (Indonesia) Rudy Wijaya | (China) Liu Yong (China) Zhang Wei | 15–9, 15–6 |
| Women's doubles | (Indonesia) Indarti Issolina (Indonesia) Deyana Lomban | (Japan) Tomomi Matsuo (Japan) Masako Sakamoto | 15–8, 15–12 |
| Women's doubles | (South Korea) Chung So-young (South Korea) Jang Hye-ock | (China) Gao Qian (China) Zhang Jin | 15–1, 15–3 |
| Mixed doubles | (South Korea) Park Joo-bong (South Korea) Ra Kyung-min | (China) Liu Yong (China) Gao Qian | 15–5, 15–4 |
| Mixed doubles | (South Korea) Kang Kyung-jin (South Korea) Kim Mee-hyang | (Indonesia) Sandiarto (Indonesia) Indarti Issolina | 15–12, 15–11 |

=== Finals ===
| Discipline | Winner | Finalist | Score |
|---|---|---|---|
| Men's singles | (Malaysia) Rashid Sidek | (China) Luo Yigang | 18–14, 15–5 |
| Women's singles | (China) Zhang Ning | (China) Zeng Yaqiong | 5–11, 11–2, 11–6 |
| Men's doubles | (South Korea) Kim Dong-moon (South Korea) Yoo Yong-sung | (Indonesia) Tony Gunawan (Indonesia) Rudy Wijaya | 15–10, 15–8 |
| Women's doubles | (South Korea) Chung So-young (South Korea) Jang Hye-ock | (Indonesia) Indarti Issolina (Indonesia) Deyana Lomban | 15–7, 15–8 |
| Mixed doubles | (South Korea) Park Joo-bong (South Korea) Ra Kyung-min | (South Korea) Kang Kyung-jin (South Korea) Kim Mee-hyang | 15–6, 15–8 |

== Sources ==
- "World Badminton Archives - Ciba Asia Cup 1996". 23 June 2021.
