= Peng Yun =

Chinese badminton player

Peng Yun 彭云
Personal information
- Born: 15 July 1974 (age 52) Guangxi, China
- Height: 1.66 m (5 ft 5 in)

Sport
- Country: China
- Sport: Badminton
- Handedness: Right
- BWF profile
Medal record
Women's badminton
Representing China
East Asian Games
Gold medal – first place	1993 Shanghai	Women's team
Silver medal – second place	1993 Shanghai	Mixed doubles

Grace Yun Peng (Chinese: 彭云; born 15 July 1974) is a former international badminton player from China, who later represented the United States.

== Early life ==
On July 15, 1974, Peng was born in Guangxi, China.

== Career ==
At age 10, Peng started training in badminton in China. Peng began her career in the U.S. on September 25, 2004. In the US Open 2004 she finished as a semifinalist in the mixed doubles and as a quarter-finalist in the women's doubles. She has won the US Open on two occasions: once in 2005 the women's doubles with her partner Johanna Lee and again in 2008 the mixed doubles crown with partner Halim Haryanto.

== Achievements ==
=== East Asian Games ===
Mixed doubles
Year	Venue	Partner	Opponent	Score	Result
1993	Shanghai, China	(China) Liang Qing	(China) Chen Xingdong (China) Sun Man	3–15, 13–15	Silver

=== BWF/IBF World Grand Prix ===
The BWF Grand Prix had two levels, the BWF Grand Prix and Grand Prix Gold. It was a series of badminton tournaments sanctioned by the Badminton World Federation (BWF) which was held from 2007 to 2017. The World Badminton Grand Prix was sanctioned by International Badminton Federation (IBF) from 1983 until 2006.

Women's doubles
Year	Tournament	Partner	Opponent	Score	Result
1994	Canadian Open	(China) Liu Guimei	(Denmark) Helene Kirkegaard (Denmark) Rikke Olsen	12–15, 9–15	(silver) Runner-up
1994	U.S. Open	(China) Liu Guimei	(Denmark) Helene Kirkegaard (Denmark) Rikke Olsen	4–15, 11–15	(silver) Runner-up
2005	U.S. Open	(United States) Lee Joo-hyun	(New Zealand) Rachel Hindley (New Zealand) Rebecca Bellingham	15–5, 15–9	(gold) Winner
2009	U.S. Open	(United States) Chen Ying	(Canada) Huang Ruilin (Canada) Jiang Xuelian	21–14, 15–21, 11–21	(silver) Runner-up

Mixed doubles
Year	Tournament	Partner	Opponent	Score	Result
1994	French Open	(China) Liang Qing	(Germany) Kai Mitteldorf (Germany) Katrin Schmidt	15–13, 15–2	(gold) Winner
2008	U.S. Open	(United States) Halim Haryanto	(Canada) Mike Beres (Canada) Valerie Loker	21–13, 21–16	(gold) Winner

BWF Grand Prix tournament

=== BWF/IBF International ===
Women's doubles
Year	Tournament	Partner	Opponent	Score	Result
2005	USA SCBA International	(United States) Lee Joo-hyun	(Japan) Miyuki Tai (Japan) Noriko Okuma	15–11, 13–15, 15–11	(gold) Winner

Mixed doubles
Year	Tournament	Partner	Opponent	Score	Result
2010	Puerto Rico International	(United States) Leonard Holvy de Pauw	(Canada) Derrick Ng (Canada) Phyllis Chan	16–21, 21–10, 21–13	(gold) Winner

BWF International Challenge tournament
BWF International Series tournament
