= Kim Mee-hyang =

South Korean badminton player

Kim Mee-hyang 김미향
Personal information
- Born: 1 October 1973 (age 53)
- Height: 1.65 m (5 ft 5 in)

Sport
- Country: South Korea
- Sport: Badminton
- Handedness: Right
- Event: Women's & mixed doubles

Women's & mixed doubles
- BWF profile
Medal record
Women's badminton
Representing South Korea
World Cup
Bronze medal – third place	1996 Jakarta	Women's doubles
Sudirman Cup
Silver medal – second place	1997 Glasgow	Mixed team
Bronze medal – third place	1995 Lausanne	Mixed team
Uber Cup
Bronze medal – third place	1996 Hong Kong	Women's team
Bronze medal – third place	1998 Hong Kong	Women's team
Asian Championships
Silver medal – second place	1996 Surabaya	Mixed doubles
Asian Cup
Silver medal – second place	1996 Seoul	Mixed doubles
East Asian Games
Silver medal – second place	1993 Shanghai	Women's team
Bronze medal – third place	1993 Shanghai	Mixed doubles

Kim Mee-hyang (Korean: 김미향; born 1 October 1973) is a South Korean retired badminton player. She was part of the Korea Tobacco & Ginseng Corporation team. In 1995, she won her first international title at the Swedish Open in the women's doubles event partnered with Kim Shin-young. Together with Kim Shin-young, they were ranked as World No. 9 and competed at the 1996 Atlanta Olympic Games.

== Achievements ==
=== World Cup ===
Women's doubles
Year	Venue	Partner	Opponent	Score	Result
1996	Istora Senayan; Jakarta, Indonesia	(South Korea) Kim Shin-young	(China) Ge Fei (China) Gu Jun	2–15, 4–15	Bronze

=== Asian Championships ===
Mixed doubles
Year	Venue	Partner	Opponent	Score	Result
1996	Pancasila Hall; Surabaya, Indonesia	(South Korea) Kang Kyung-jin	(Indonesia) Tri Kusharyanto (Indonesia) Lili Tampi	1–15, 6–15	Silver

=== Asian Cup ===
Mixed doubles
Year	Venue	Partner	Opponent	Score	Result
1996	Olympic Gymnasium No. 2 Seoul, South Korea	(South Korea) Kang Kyung-jin	(South Korea) Park Joo-bong (South Korea) Ra Kyung-min	6–15, 8–15	Silver

=== East Asian Games ===
Mixed doubles
Year	Venue	Partner	Opponent	Score	Result
1993	Shanghai, China	(South Korea) Chung Kwon	(China) Chen Xingdong (China) Sun Man	7–15, 5–15	Bronze

=== IBF World Grand Prix ===
The World Badminton Grand Prix sanctioned by International Badminton Federation (IBF) since 1983.

Women's doubles
Year	Tournament	Partner	Opponent	Score	Result
1996	China Open	(South Korea) Park Soo-yun	(China) Qin Yiyuan (China) Tang Yongshu	2–15, 12–15	(silver) Runner-up
1996	Swedish Open	(South Korea) Kim Shin-young	(Denmark) Helene Kirkegaard (Denmark) Rikke Olsen	18–13, 12–15, 10–15	(silver) Runner-up
1996	Korea Open	(South Korea) Kim Shin-young	(South Korea) Gil Young-ah (South Korea) Jang Hye-ock	15–11, 11–15, 4–15	(silver) Runner-up
1996	Chinese Taipei Open	(South Korea) Kim Shin-young	(China) Ge Fei (China) Gu Jun	8–15, 13–15	(silver) Runner-up
1995	U.S. Open	(South Korea) Kim Shin-young	(South Korea) Gil Young-ah (South Korea) Jang Hye-ock	9–15, 4–15	(silver) Runner-up
1995	Swedish Open	(South Korea) Kim Shin-young	(China) Han Jingna (China) Ye Zhaoying	12–15, 15–12, 15–8	(gold) Winner
1994	Singapore Open	(South Korea) Gil Young-ah	(China) Ge Fei (China) Gu Jun	7–15, 16–18	(silver) Runner-up

Mixed doubles
Year	Tournament	Partner	Opponent	Score	Result
1995	Canadian Open	(South Korea) Kang Kyung-jin	(South Korea) Kim Dong-moon (South Korea) Gil Young-ah	7–15, 8–15	(silver) Runner-up
