= Ha Tae-kwon =

South Korean badminton player

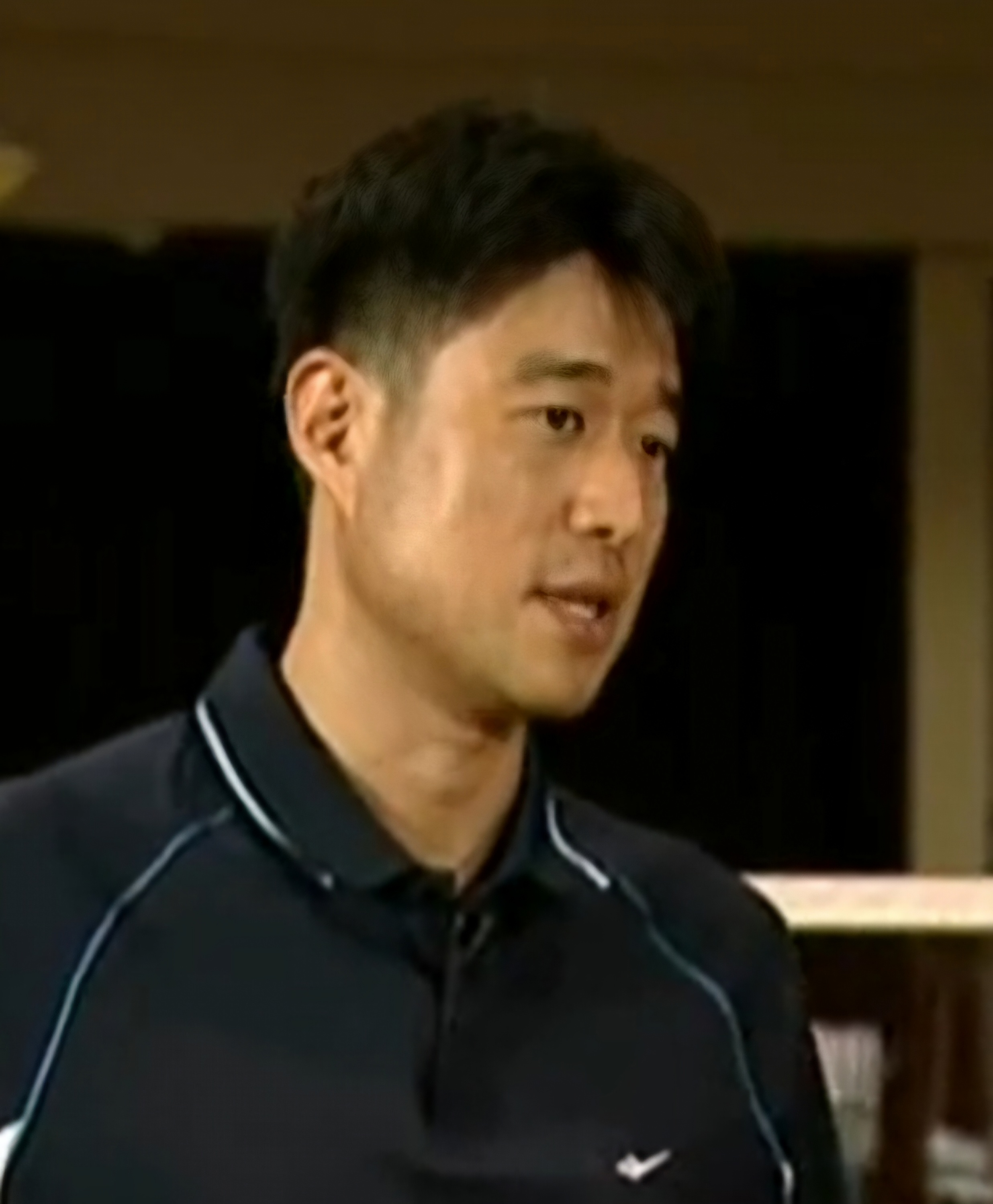

Personal information
- Born: 30 April 1975 (age 51) Jeonju, North Jeolla Province, South Korea
- Height: 1.87 m (6 ft 2 in)
- Weight: 85 kg (187 lb)

Sport
- Country: South Korea
- Sport: Badminton
- Handedness: Right

Men's doubles
- Highest ranking: 1
- BWF profile
Medal record
Men's badminton
Representing South Korea
Olympic Games
Gold medal – first place	2004 Athens	Men's doubles
Bronze medal – third place	2000 Sydney	Men's doubles
World Championships
Gold medal – first place	1999 Copenhagen	Men's doubles
Silver medal – second place	2001 Seville	Men's doubles
Sudirman Cup
Silver medal – second place	1997 Glasgow	Mixed team
Bronze medal – third place	1995 Lausanne	Mixed team
Bronze medal – third place	1999 Copenhagen	Mixed team
Bronze medal – third place	2001 seville	Mixed team
Bronze medal – third place	2005 Beijing	Mixed team
Thomas Cup
Bronze medal – third place	1996 Hong Kong	Men's team
Bronze medal – third place	2000 Kuala Lumpur	Men's team
Asian Games
Gold medal – first place	2002 Busan	Men's team
Silver medal – second place	1994 Hiroshima	Men's team
Bronze medal – third place	1998 Bangkok	Men's team
Asian Championships
Gold medal – first place	1998 Bangkok	Men's doubles
Gold medal – first place	1999 Kuala Lumpur	Men's doubles
Gold medal – first place	2002 Bangkok	Men's doubles
Silver medal – second place	1996 Surabaya	Men's doubles
Bronze medal – third place	1996 Surabaya	Mixed doubles
Asian Cup
Bronze medal – third place	1995 Qingdao	Mixed doubles
Asia Cup
Bronze medal – third place	1999 Ho Chi Minh	Men's team

- Ha Tae-kwon
- Hangul: 하태권
- Hanja: 河泰權
- RR: Ha Taegwon
- MR: Ha T'aegwŏn

Ha Tae-kwon (Korean: 하태권; Hanja: 河泰權; born 30 April 1975) is a badminton player from South Korea. Born in Jeonju, North Jeolla Province, Ha started his career in badminton with the recommendation of Kim Dong-moon in elementary school. He made his international debut in 1992, and won his first Grand Prix title at the 1995 Canada Open. Ha three times competed in Olympic Games in 1996, 2000 and 2004, won a bronze medal in 2000 and a gold medal in 2004.

== Career ==
Ha made his first appearance in Olympic Games in 1996 Atlanta, competed in the men's doubles event partnered with Kang Kyung-jin. He and Kang reached the quarterfinals after beat Siripong Siripul/Khunakorn Sudhisodhi of Thailand and Jon Holst-Christensen/Thomas Lund of Denmark in the first and second round. In the quarterfinals they were defeated by the Malaysian pair Yap Kim Hock/Cheah Soon Kit in straight games.

In 2000 Sydney, Ha qualified to compete in two events. Teamed-up with Chung Jae-hee in the mixed doubles, they finished their campaign in the second round, beat the Ukrainian Vladislav Druzchenko/Viktoriya Evtushenko and lost to eventual silver medalists Trikus Haryanto/Minarti Timur of Indonesia. In the men's doubles, he partnered with Kim Dong-moon. They had bye in the first round, beat Yap Kim Hock/Cheah Soon Kit of Malaysia and Ricky Subagja/Rexy Mainaky of Indonesia in the second and quarterfinals, lost to Tony Gunawan/Candra Wijaya of Indonesia in the semifinals, and won a bronze medal match against Choong Tan Fook/Lee Wan Wah of Malaysia.

In 2004 Athens, Ha competed in the men's doubles with Kim Dong-moon as a third seeded. They had a bye in the first round and defeated Robert Mateusiak/Michał Łogosz of Poland in the second. In the quarterfinals, Ha and Kim beat Zheng Bo/Sang Yang of China 15–7, 15–11. They won the semifinal against Eng Hian/Flandy Limpele of Indonesia 15–8, 15–2 and defeated fellow Koreans Lee Dong-soo and Yoo Yong-sung 15–11, 15–4 to win the gold medal.

In 2005, he competed at the Sudirman Cup, and helped the national team win a bronze medal.

Ha graduated from the Wonkwang University. In 2008, he was coach of the national team, and in October of the same year he became the coach of Samsung Electro-Mechanics.

== Achievements ==
=== Olympic Games ===
Men's doubles
Year	Venue	Partner	Opponent	Score	Result
2004	Goudi Olympic Hall, Athens, Greece	(South Korea) Kim Dong-moon	(South Korea) Lee Dong-soo (South Korea) Yoo Yong-sung	15–11, 15–4	Gold
2000	The Dome, Sydney, Australia	(South Korea) Kim Dong-moon	(Malaysia) Choong Tan Fook (Malaysia) Lee Wan Wah	15–2, 15–8	Bronze

=== World Championships ===
Men's doubles
Year	Venue	Partner	Opponent	Score	Result
2001	Palacio de Deportes de San Pablo, Seville, Spain	(South Korea) Kim Dong-moon	(Indonesia) Tony Gunawan (Indonesia) Halim Haryanto	0–15, 13–15	Silver
1999	Brøndby Arena, Copenhagen, Denmark	(South Korea) Kim Dong-moon	(South Korea) Lee Dong-soo (South Korea) Yoo Yong-sung	15–5, 15–5	Gold

=== Asian Championships ===
Men's doubles
Year	Venue	Partner	Opponent	Score	Result
2002	Nimibutr Stadium; Bangkok, Thailand	(South Korea) Kim Dong-moon	(Indonesia) Candra Wijaya (Indonesia) Sigit Budiarto	15–6, 15–8	Gold
1999	Kuala Lumpur Badminton Stadium; Kuala Lumpur, Malaysia	(South Korea) Kim Dong-moon	(China) Zhang Wei (China) Zhang Jun	15–6, 15–4	Gold
1998	Nimibutr Stadium; Bangkok, Thailand	(South Korea) Kang Kyung-jin	(China) Zhang Wei (China) Zhang Jun	12–15, 15–11, 15–13	Gold
1996	Pancasila Hall; Surabaya, Indonesia	(South Korea) Kang Kyung-jin	(Indonesia) Ade Sutrisna (Indonesia) Candra Wijaya	8–15, 17–15, 11–15	Silver

Mixed doubles
Year	Venue	Partner	Opponent	Score	Result
1996	Pancasila Hall; Surabaya, Indonesia	(South Korea) Kim Shin-young	(Indonesia) Tri Kusharyanto (Indonesia) Lili Tampi	10–15, 4–15	Bronze

=== Asian Cup ===
Mixed doubles
Year	Venue	Partner	Opponent	Score	Result
1995	Xinxing Gymnasium; Qingdao, China	(South Korea) Kim Shin-young	(South Korea) Kim Dong-moon (South Korea) Gil Young-ah	–, –	Bronze

=== IBF World Grand Prix (24 titles, 9 runners-up) ===
The World Badminton Grand Prix has been sanctioned by International Badminton Federation (IBF) since 1983.

Men's doubles
Year	Tournament	Partner	Opponent	Score	Result
2004	Japan Open	(South Korea) Kim Dong-moon	(China) Cai Yun (China) Fu Haifeng	15–7, 6–15, 15–6	(gold) Winner
2003	Chinese Taipei Open	(South Korea) Kim Dong-moon	(Indonesia) Flandy Limpele (Indonesia) Eng Hian	15–4, 15–1	(gold) Winner
2003	Denmark Open	(South Korea) Kim Dong-moon	(Indonesia) Halim Haryanto (Indonesia) Candra Wijaya	16–17, 15–6, 15–8	(gold) Winner
2003	Dutch Open	(South Korea) Kim Dong-moon	(South Korea) Kim Yong-hyun (South Korea) Yim Bang-eun	15–2, 15–2	(gold) Winner
2003	Korea Open	(South Korea) Kim Dong-moon	(South Korea) Lee Dong-soo (South Korea) Yoo Yong-sung	15–11, 15–6	(gold) Winner
2003	Thailand Open	(South Korea) Yoo Yong-sung	(Thailand) Sudket Prapakamol (Thailand) Patapol Ngernsrisuk	15–8, 15–6	(gold) Winner
2002	Denmark Open	(South Korea) Kim Dong-moon	(Malaysia) Chan Chong Ming (Malaysia) Chew Choon Eng	15–4, 15–8	(gold) Winner
2002	Dutch Open	(South Korea) Kim Dong-moon	(Denmark) Jens Eriksen (Denmark) Martin Lundgaard Hansen	15–8, 15–8	(gold) Winner
2002	All England Open	(South Korea) Kim Dong-moon	(Indonesia) Flandy Limpele (Indonesia) Eng Hian	7–2, 7–2, 1–7, 7–3	(gold) Winner
2002	Singapore Open	(South Korea) Kim Dong-moon	(Indonesia) Flandy Limpele (Indonesia) Eng Hian	8–15, 15–11, 14–17	(silver) Runner-up
2002	Chinese Taipei Open	(South Korea) Kim Dong-moon	(Indonesia) Bambang Suprianto (Indonesia) Candra Wijaya	15–9, 13–15, 15–3	(gold) Winner
2002	Korea Open	(South Korea) Kim Dong-moon	(South Korea) Lee Dong-soo (South Korea) Yoo Yong-sung	7–0, 7–4, 7–0	(gold) Winner
2001	Korea Open	(South Korea) Kim Dong-moon	(South Korea) Lee Dong-soo (South Korea) Yoo Yong-sung	15–9, 15–4	(gold) Winner
2000	Swiss Open	(South Korea) Kim Dong-moon	(Denmark) Jens Eriksen (Denmark) Jesper Larsen	15–12, 15–2	(gold) Winner
2000	All England Open	(South Korea) Kim Dong-moon	(South Korea) Lee Dong-soo (South Korea) Yoo Yong-sung	15–4, 13–15, 17–15	(gold) Winner
1999	Grand Prix Finals	(South Korea) Kim Dong-moon	(Indonesia) Candra Wijaya (Indonesia) Tony Gunawan	7–15, 15–8, 11–15	(silver) Runner-up
1999	China Open	(South Korea) Kim Dong-moon	(South Korea) Lee Dong-soo (South Korea) Yoo Yong-sung	17–16, 15–8	(gold) Winner
1999	Japan Open	(South Korea) Kim Dong-moon	(South Korea) Lee Dong-soo (South Korea) Yoo Yong-sung	15–6, 15–4	(gold) Winner
1999	Swedish Open	(South Korea) Kim Dong-moon	(South Korea) Lee Dong-soo (South Korea) Yoo Yong-sung	15–11, 15–5	(gold) Winner
1997	Hong Kong Open	(South Korea) Kim Dong-moon	(Indonesia) Eng Hian (Indonesia) Hermono Yuwono	15–4, 15–12	(gold) Winner
1997	U.S. Open	(South Korea) Kim Dong-moon	(China) Liu Yong (China) Zhang Wei	15–3, 6–15, 15–12	(gold) Winner
1997	All England Open	(South Korea) Kang Kyung-jin	(Denmark) Jon Holst-Christensen (Denmark) Michael Sogaard	15–11, 17–16	(gold) Winner
1997	Swedish Open	(South Korea) Kang Kyung-jin	(Sweden) Peter Axelsson (Sweden) Pär-Gunnar Jönsson	15–3, 15–11	(gold) Winner
1997	Korea Open	(South Korea) Kang Kyung-jin	(Malaysia) Cheah Soon Kit (Malaysia) Yap Kim Hock	4–15, 15–3, 15–5	(gold) Winner
1996	Thailand Open	(South Korea) Kang Kyung-jin	(Indonesia) Sigit Budiarto (Indonesia) Candra Wijaya	11–15, 15–10, 12–15	(silver) Runner-up
1995	Hong Kong Open	(South Korea) Kang Kyung-jin	(Indonesia) Rudy Gunawan (Indonesia) Bambang Suprianto	17–15, 12–15, 15–3	(gold) Winner
1995	Canadian Open	(South Korea) Kang Kyung-jin	(South Korea) Kim Dong-moon (South Korea) Yoo Yong-sung	12–15, 15–6, 15–8	(gold) Winner

Mixed doubles
Year	Tournament	Partner	Opponent	Score	Result
2002	Dutch Open	(South Korea) Hwang Yu-mi	(South Korea) Kim Dong-moon (South Korea) Lee Kyung-won	9–11, 2–11	(silver) Runner-up
1999	Japan Open	(South Korea) Chung Jae-hee	(China) Liu Yong (China) Ge Fei	1–15, 3–15	(silver) Runner-up
1999	All England Open	(South Korea) Chung Jae-hee	(England) Simon Archer (England) Joanne Goode	2–15, 13–15	(silver) Runner-up
1999	Swedish Open	(South Korea) Chung Jae-hee	(South Korea) Kim Dong-moon (South Korea) Ra Kyung-min	1–15, 4–15	(silver) Runner-up
1997	Hong Kong Open	(South Korea) Chung Jae-hee	(South Korea) Kim Dong-moon (South Korea) Ra Kyung-min	12–15, 3–15	(silver) Runner-up
1994	Hong Kong Open	(South Korea) Shim Eun-jung	(Denmark) Thomas Lund (Denmark) Marlene Thomsen	14–17, 12–15	(silver) Runner-up

=== IBF International (2 titles, 2 runners-up) ===
Men's doubles
Year	Tournament	Partner	Opponent	Score	Result
2002	Malaysia Satellite	(South Korea) Kim Dong-moon	(Malaysia) Jeremy Gan (Malaysia) Gan Teik Chai	15–4, 15–0	(gold) Winner
1999	Australian International	(South Korea) Lee Dong-soo	(South Korea) Kim Dong-moon (South Korea) Yoo Yong-sung	17–14, 9–15, 12–15	(silver) Runner-up
1991	Hungarian International	(South Korea) Hwang Sun-ho	(South Korea) Kim Young-gil (South Korea) Lee Dong-soo	17–14, 12–15, 9–15	(silver) Runner-up

Mixed doubles
Year	Tournament	Partner	Opponent	Score	Result
2002	Malaysia Satellite	(South Korea) Lee Kyung-won	(Indonesia) Robby Istanta (Indonesia) Yunita Tetty	11–6, 11–0	(gold) Winner
