= Kim Shin-young (badminton) =

South Korean badminton player

Kim Shin-young 김신영
Personal information
- Born: 10 July 1975 (age 51)

Sport
- Country: South Korea
- Sport: Badminton
- Event: Women's & mixed doubles

Women's & mixed doubles
- BWF profile
Medal record
Women's badminton
Representing South Korea
World Cup
Silver medal – second place	1995 Jakarta	Mixed doubles
Bronze medal – third place	1996 Jakarta	Women's doubles
Sudirman Cup
Silver medal – second place	1997 Glasgow	Mixed team
Uber Cup
Bronze medal – third place	1998 Hong Kong	Women's team
Bronze medal – third place	1996 Hong Kong	Women's team
Asian Games
Silver medal – second place	1998 Bangkok	Women's team
Asian Championships
Bronze medal – third place	1996 Surabaya	Mixed doubles
Bronze medal – third place	1995 Beijing	Mixed doubles
Asian Cup
Bronze medal – third place	1995 Qingdao	Mixed doubles
East Asian Games
Gold medal – first place	1993 Shanghai	Women's doubles
Silver medal – second place	1993 Shanghai	Women's team
World Junior Championships
Silver medal – second place	1992 Jakarta	Mixed doubles

Kim Shin-young (Korean: 김신영; born 10 July 1975) is a South Korean retired badminton player. Played for the Jeonbuk bank, she competed at the 1996 Atlanta Olympic Games and 1998 Bangkok Asian Games.

== Achievements ==
=== World Cup ===
Women's doubles
Year	Venue	Partner	Opponent	Score	Result
1996	Jakarta, Indonesia	(South Korea) Kim Mee-hyang	(China) Ge Fei (China) Gu Jun	2–15, 4–15	Bronze

Mixed doubles
Year	Venue	Partner	Opponent	Score	Result
1995	Jakarta, Indonesia	(South Korea) Kim Dong-moon	(Indonesia) Tri Kusharyanto (Indonesia) Minarti Timur	9–15, 18–13, 12–15	Silver

=== Asian Championships ===
Mixed doubles
Year	Venue	Partner	Opponent	Score	Result
1996	Pancasila Hall; Surabaya, Indonesia	(South Korea) Ha Tae-kwon	(Indonesia) Tri Kusharyanto (Indonesia) Lili Tampi	10–15, 4–15	Bronze
1995	Olympic Sports Center Gymnasium; Beijing, China	(South Korea) Kim Dong-moon	(China) Liu Jianjun (China) Ge Fei	16–18, 11–15	Bronze

=== Asian Cup ===
Mixed doubles
Year	Venue	Partner	Opponent	Score	Result
1995	Xinxing Gymnasium; Qingdao, China	(South Korea) Ha Tae-kwon	(South Korea) Kim Dong-moon (South Korea) Gil Young-ah	–, –	Bronze

=== East Asian Games ===
Women's doubles
Year	Venue	Partner	Opponent	Score	Result
1993	Shanghai, China	(South Korea) Shon Hye-joo	(China) Qin Yiyuan (China) Zhang Ning	15–12, 15–11	Gold

=== World Junior Championships ===
Mixed doubles
Year	Venue	Partner	Opponent	Score	Result
1992	Istora Senayan; Jakarta, Indonesia	(South Korea) Kim Dong-moon	(Denmark) Jim Laugesen (Denmark) Rikke Olsen	11–15, 17–18	Silver

=== IBF World Grand Prix ===
The World Badminton Grand Prix sanctioned by International Badminton Federation (IBF) since 1983.

Women's doubles
Year	Tournament	Partner	Opponent	Score	Result
1996	Swedish Open	(South Korea) Kim Mee-hyang	(Denmark) Helene Kirkegaard (Denmark) Rikke Olsen	18–13, 12–15, 10–15	(silver) Runner-up
1996	Korea Open	(South Korea) Kim Mee-hyang	(South Korea) Gil Young-ah (South Korea) Jang Hye-ock	15–11, 11–15, 4–15	(silver) Runner-up
1996	Chinese Taipei Open	(South Korea) Kim Mee-hyang	(China) Ge Fei (China) Gu Jun	8–15, 13–15	(silver) Runner-up
1995	U.S. Open	(South Korea) Kim Mee-hyang	(South Korea) Gil Young-ah (South Korea) Jang Hye-ock	9–15, 4–15	(silver) Runner-up
1995	Swedish Open	(South Korea) Kim Mee-hyang	(China) Han Jingna (China) Ye Zhaoying	12–15, 15–12, 15–8	(gold) Winner

Mixed doubles
Year	Tournament	Partner	Opponent	Score	Result
1995	Chinese Taipei Open	(South Korea) Kim Dong-moon	(Denmark) Jens Eriksen (Denmark) Rikke Olsen	10–15, 5–15	(silver) Runner-up

=== IBF International ===
Women's doubles
Year	Tournament	Partner	Opponent	Score	Result
1992	Wimbledon Open	(South Korea) Kim Jae-jung	(Russia) Marina Andrievskaya (Russia) Elena Rybkina	1–15, 15–5, 7–15	(silver) Runner-up
1991	Hungarian International	(South Korea) Park Soo-yun	(South Korea) Choi Ma-ree (South Korea) Ra Kyung-min	15–9, 15–6	(gold) Winner
