= Jeffer Rosobin =

Indonesian badminton player

Personal information
- Born: 5 January 1976 (age 50) Bangkinang, Riau, Indonesia

Sport
- Country: Indonesia
- Sport: Badminton
- Handedness: Right
- BWF profile
Medal record
Men's badminton
Representing Indonesia
World Cup
| Silver medal – second place | 1996 Jakarta | Men's singles |
Asian Championships
| Gold medal – first place | 1996 Surabaya | Men's singles |
Southeast Asian Games
| Gold medal – first place | 1999 Bandar Seri Begawan | Men's team |

Jeffer Rosobin (born 5 January 1976) is a retired badminton player from Indonesia. He was the men's singles champion at the 1996 Asian Championships, and once occupied the top 10 BWF rankings. Rosobin was recorded as a Singapore national coach. In 2017, he joined the Indonesia national training camp, as a women's singles coach.

== Achievements ==
=== World Cup ===
Men's singles
| Year | Venue | Opponent | Score | Result |
|---|---|---|---|---|
| 1996 | Istora Senayan; Jakarta, Indonesia | (China) Dong Jiong | 5–15, 8–15 | Silver |

=== Asian Championships ===
Men's singles
| Year | Venue | Opponent | Score | Result |
|---|---|---|---|---|
| 1996 | GOR Pancasila; Surabaya, Indonesia | (China) Luo Yigang | 9–15, 15–7, 15–5 | Gold |

=== IBF World Grand Prix ===
The World Badminton Grand Prix sanctioned by International Badminton Federation (IBF) since 1983.

Men's singles
| Year | Tournament | Opponent | Score | Result |
|---|---|---|---|---|
| 1995 | Polish Open | (Indonesia) Budi Santoso | 15–11, 8–15, 11–15 | (silver) Runner-up |
| 1995 | Brunei Open | (Malaysia) Rashid Sidek | 9–15, 3–15 | (silver) Runner-up |
| 1998 | Malaysia Open | (Denmark) Peter Gade | 5–15, 12–15 | (silver) Runner-up |

IBF Grand Prix tournament
IBF Grand Prix Finals tournament

=== IBF International ===
Men's singles
| Year | Tournament | Opponent | Score | Result |
|---|---|---|---|---|
| 2004 | Pakistan Satellite | (Indonesia) Marleve Mainaky | 15–4, 15–0 | (gold) Winner |
| 2005 | Jakarta Satellite | (Indonesia) Budi Santoso | 15–13, 15–12 | (gold) Winner |
| 2005 | Cheers Asian Satellite | (Indonesia) Wiempie Mahardi | 15–8, 15–11 | (gold) Winner |
| 2005 | Surabaya Satellite | (South Korea) Park Sung-hwan | 16–17, 15–10, 11–15 | (silver) Runner-up |
| 2006 | Vietnam Satellite | (Vietnam) Nguyễn Tiến Minh | 17–21, 12–21 | (silver) Runner-up |
| 2006 | Cheers Asian Satellite | (Indonesia) Andreas Adityawarman | 21–19, 15–21, 23–21 | (gold) Winner |
| 2006 | Surabaya Satellite | (Indonesia) Alamsyah Yunus | 21–16, 21–19 | (gold) Winner |
| 2006 | Malaysia Satellite | (Indonesia) Alamsyah Yunus | 14–21, 21–15, 22–20 | (gold) Winner |

=== IBF Junior International ===
Boys' singles
| Year | Tournament | Opponent | Score | Result | Ref. |
|---|---|---|---|---|---|
| 1994 | German Junior | (Indonesia) Tony Gunawan | | (gold) Winner | |
