= 1996 Asian Badminton Championships =

Badminton championships

Tournament information
- Location: GOR Pancasila, Surabaya, Indonesia
- Dates: April 17–April 21

The 1996 Badminton Asia Championships was the 15th tournament of the Badminton Asia Championships. It was held at the GOR Pancasila in Surabaya, Indonesia in 17 - 21 April 1996.

== Medalists ==
| Event | Gold | Silver | Bronze |
|---|---|---|---|
| Men's singles | (Indonesia) Jeffer Rosobin | (China) Luo Yigang | (Indonesia) A. K. Johannes |
| Men's singles | (Indonesia) Jeffer Rosobin | (China) Luo Yigang | (Indonesia) Dwi Aryanto |
| Women's singles | (China) Gong Zhichao | (South Korea) Lee Joo-hyun | (Indonesia) Ika Heny |
| Women's singles | (China) Gong Zhichao | (South Korea) Lee Joo-hyun | (Thailand) Pornsawan Plungwech |
| Men's doubles | (Indonesia) Ade Sutrisna (Indonesia) Candra Wijaya | (South Korea) Ha Tae-kwon (South Korea) Kang Kyung-jin | (Indonesia) Cun Cun Haryono (Indonesia) Ade Lukas |
| Men's doubles | (Indonesia) Ade Sutrisna (Indonesia) Candra Wijaya | (South Korea) Ha Tae-kwon (South Korea) Kang Kyung-jin | (Indonesia) Sigit Budiarto (Indonesia) Dicky Purwotjugiono |
| Women's doubles | (Indonesia) Eliza Nathanael (Indonesia) Finarsih | (Indonesia) Indarti Issolina (Indonesia) Deyana Lomban | (South Korea) Chung Jae-hee (South Korea) Park Soo-yun |
| Women's doubles | (Indonesia) Eliza Nathanael (Indonesia) Finarsih | (Indonesia) Indarti Issolina (Indonesia) Deyana Lomban | (Japan) Hisako Mizui (Japan) Yasuko Mizui |
| Mixed doubles | (Indonesia) Tri Kusharyanto (Indonesia) Lili Tampi | (South Korea) Kang Kyung-jin (South Korea) Kim Mee-hyang | (Indonesia) Flandy Limpele (Indonesia) Riseu Rosalina |
| Mixed doubles | (Indonesia) Tri Kusharyanto (Indonesia) Lili Tampi | (South Korea) Kang Kyung-jin (South Korea) Kim Mee-hyang | (South Korea) Ha Tae-kwon (South Korea) Kim Shin-young |

== Medal table ==
| Rank | Nation | Gold | Silver | Bronze | Total |
|---|---|---|---|---|---|
| 1 | Indonesia (INA) | 4 | 1 | 6 | 11 |
| 2 | China (CHN) | 1 | 1 | 0 | 2 |
| 3 | South Korea (KOR) | 0 | 3 | 2 | 5 |
| 4 | Japan (JPN) | 0 | 0 | 1 | 1 |
| 4 | Thailand (THA) | 0 | 0 | 1 | 1 |
| Totals (5 entries) | | 5 | 5 | 10 | 20 |

=== Finals ===
| Category | Winners | Runners-up | Score |
|---|---|---|---|
| Men's singles | (Indonesia) Jeffer Rosobin | (China) Luo Yigang | 9-15, 15-7, 15-5 |
| Women's singles | (China) Gong Zhichao | (South Korea) Lee Joo-hyun | 11-7, 11-1 |
| Men's doubles | (Indonesia) Ade Sutrisna (Indonesia) Candra Wijaya | (South Korea) Ha Tae-kwon (South Korea) Kang Kyung-jin | 15-8, 15-17, 15-11 |
| Women's doubles | (Indonesia) Eliza Nathanael (Indonesia) Finarsih | (Indonesia) Indarti Issolina (Indonesia) Deyana Lomban | 15-8. 15-6 |
| Mixed doubles | (Indonesia) Tri Kusharyanto (Indonesia) Lili Tampi | (South Korea) Kang Kyung-jin (South Korea) Kim Mee-hyang | 15-1, 15-6 |

=== Semifinals ===
| Category | Winner | Runner-up | Score |
|---|---|---|---|
| Men's singles | (Indonesia) Jeffer Rosobin | (Indonesia) A. K. Johannes | 15–4, 10–15, 15–9 |
| Men's singles | (China) Luo Yigang | (Indonesia) Dwi Aryanto | 15–10, 15–12 |
| Women's singles | (South Korea) Lee Joo-hyun | (Indonesia) Ika Heny | 11–3, 11–5 |
| Women's singles | (China) Gong Zhichao | (Thailand) Pornsawan Plungwech | 4–11, 11–7, 11–5 |
| Men's doubles | (Indonesia) Ade Sutrisna (Indonesia) Candra Wijaya | (Indonesia) Ade Lukas (Indonesia) Cun Cun Harjono | 15–13, 15–3 |
| Men's doubles | (South Korea) Ha Tae-kwon (South Korea) Kang Kyung-jin | (Indonesia) Dicky Purwotjugiono (Indonesia) Sigit Budiarto | 15–5, 15–9 |
| Women's doubles | (Indonesia) Deyana Lomban (Indonesia) Indarti Issolina | (Japan) Hisako Mizui (Japan) Yasuko Mizui | 15–9, 15–9 |
| Women's doubles | (Indonesia) Eliza Nathanael (Indonesia) Finarsih | (South Korea) Chung Jae-hee (South Korea) Park Soo-yun | 15–10, 15–3 |
| Mixed doubles | (South Korea) Kang Kyung-jin (South Korea) Kim Mee-hyang | (Indonesia) Flandy Limpele (Indonesia) Rosalina Riseu | 2–15, 15–7, 15–10 |
| Mixed doubles | (Indonesia) Tri Kusharjanto (Indonesia) Lili Tampi | (South Korea) Ha Tae-kwon (South Korea) Kim Shin-young | 15–10, 15–4 |
