= 1998 Asian Badminton Championships =

Badminton championships

Tournament information
- Location: Bangkok, Thailand
- Dates: September 2–September 5

The 1998 Asian Badminton Championships was the 17th edition of the Badminton Asia Championships. It was held in Bangkok, Thailand, from September 2 to September 5. At the end of competitions, China took titles from three disciplines; Both the singles and Women's doubles, while South Korea won Men's doubles and Mixed doubles events.

== Medalists ==
Event	Gold	Silver	Bronze
Men's singles	(China) Chen Gang	(Indonesia) Marleve Mainaky	(China) Luo Yigang
Men's singles	(China) Chen Gang	(Indonesia) Marleve Mainaky	(Indonesia) Taufik Hidayat
Women's singles	(China) Ye Zhaoying	(China) Gong Zhichao	(China) Dai Yun
Women's singles	(China) Ye Zhaoying	(China) Gong Zhichao	(China) Gong Ruina
Men's doubles	(South Korea) Ha Tae-kwon (South Korea) Kang Kyung-jin	(China) Zhang Jun (China) Zhang Wei	(Indonesia) Halim Heryanto (Indonesia) Tony Gunawan
Men's doubles	(South Korea) Ha Tae-kwon (South Korea) Kang Kyung-jin	(China) Zhang Jun (China) Zhang Wei	(Indonesia) Eng Hian (Indonesia) Flandy Limpele
Women's doubles	(China) Ge Fei (China) Gu Jun	(China) Qin Yiyuan (China) Tang Hetian	(South Korea) Chung Jae-hee (South Korea) Yim Kyung-jin
Women's doubles	(China) Ge Fei (China) Gu Jun	(China) Qin Yiyuan (China) Tang Hetian	(Indonesia) Eliza Nathanael (Indonesia) Zelin Resiana
Mixed doubles	(South Korea) Kim Dong-moon (South Korea) Ra Kyung-min	(China) Sun Jun (China) Ge Fei	(Indonesia) Bambang Suprianto (Indonesia) Zelin Resiana
Mixed doubles	(South Korea) Kim Dong-moon (South Korea) Ra Kyung-min	(China) Sun Jun (China) Ge Fei	(China) Chen Gang (China) Tang Hetian

== Medal table ==
Rank	Nation	Gold	Silver	Bronze	Total
1	China (CHN)	3	4	4	11
2	South Korea	2	0	1	3
3	Indonesia (INA)	0	1	5	6
Totals (3 entries)		5	5	10	20

== Final results ==
=== Men's singles ===
Semi-finals
(China) Chen Gang	15	15
(China) Luo Yigang	5	8
(Indonesia) Taufik Hidayat	15	5
(Indonesia) Marleve Mainaky	17	15

Final
(China) Chen Gang	15	15
(Indonesia) Marleve Mainaky	6	9

=== Women's singles ===
Semi-finals
(China) Ye Zhaoying	w	/	o
(China) Dai Yun
(China) Gong Zhichao	11	11
(China) Gong Ruina	5	5

Final
(China) Ye Zhaoying	11	13
(China) Gong Zhichao	5	12

=== Men's doubles ===
Semi-finals
(China) Zhang Jun (China) Zhang Wei	17	9	15
(Indonesia) Eng Hian (Indonesia) Flandy Limpele	15	15	12
(Indonesia) Halim Heryanto (Indonesia) Tony Gunawan	15	8	12
(South Korea) Ha Tae-kwon (South Korea) Kang Kyung-jin	6	15	15

Final
(China) Zhang Jun (China) Zhang Wei	15	11	13
(South Korea) Ha Tae-kwon (South Korea) Kang Kyung-jin	12	15	15

=== Women's doubles ===
Semi-finals
(China) Ge Fei (China) Gu Jun	15	15
(Indonesia) Eliza Nathanael (Indonesia) Zelin Resiana	2	10
(South Korea) Chung Jae-hee (South Korea) Yim Kyung-jin	5	5
(China) Qin Yiyuan (China) Tang Hetian	15	15

Final
(China) Ge Fei (China) Gu Jun	15	15
(China) Qin Yiyuan (China) Tang Hetian	8	7

=== Mixed doubles ===
Semi-finals
(China) Chen Gang (China) Tang Hetian	1	5
(South Korea) Kim Dong-moon (South Korea) Ra Kyung-min	15	15
(China) Sun Jun (China) Ge Fei	15	17
(Indonesia) Bambang Suprianto (Indonesia) Zelin Resiana	5	15

Final
(South Korea) Kim Dong-moon (South Korea) Ra Kyung-min	15	15
(China) Sun Jun (China) Ge Fei	7	8
