= Ra Kyung-min =

South Korean badminton player (born 1976)

Personal information
- Born: 25 November 1976 (age 49) Hongcheon-gun, Gangwon Province, South Korea
- Height: 1.75 m (5 ft 9 in)
- Weight: 65 kg (143 lb)
- Spouse: Kim Dong-moon (m. 2005)

Sport
- Country: South Korea
- Sport: Badminton
- Handedness: Right

Women's & mixed doubles
- Highest ranking: 1 (WD with Chung Jae-hee, 2002); 1 (XD with Park Joo-bong)
- BWF profile
Medal record
Women's badminton
Representing South Korea
Olympic Games
| Silver medal – second place | 1996 Atlanta | Mixed doubles |
| Bronze medal – third place | 2004 Athens | Women's doubles |
World Championships
| Gold medal – first place | 1999 Copenhagen | Mixed doubles |
| Gold medal – first place | 2003 Birmingham | Mixed doubles |
| Silver medal – second place | 1999 Copenhagen | Women's doubles |
| Silver medal – second place | 2001 Seville | Mixed doubles |
| Bronze medal – third place | 2001 Seville | Women's doubles |
Sudirman Cup
| Gold medal – first place | 2003 Eindhoven | Mixed team |
| Silver medal – second place | 1997 Glasgow | Mixed team |
| Bronze medal – third place | 1995 Lausanne | Mixed team |
| Bronze medal – third place | 1999 Copenhagen | Mixed team |
| Bronze medal – third place | 2001 Seville | Mixed team |
| Bronze medal – third place | 2005 Beijing | Mixed team |
Uber Cup
| Silver medal – second place | 2002 Guangzhou | Women's team |
| Bronze medal – third place | 1994 Jakarta | Women's team |
| Bronze medal – third place | 1996 Hong Kong | Women's team |
| Bronze medal – third place | 1998 Hong Kong | Women's team |
Asian Games
| Gold medal – first place | 1994 Hiroshima | Women's team |
| Gold medal – first place | 1998 Bangkok | Mixed doubles |
| Gold medal – first place | 2002 Busan | Mixed doubles |
| Gold medal – first place | 2002 Busan | Women's doubles |
| Silver medal – second place | 1998 Bangkok | Women's team |
| Silver medal – second place | 2002 Busan | Women's team |
| Bronze medal – third place | 1998 Bangkok | Women's doubles |
Asian Championships
| Gold medal – first place | 1998 Bangkok | Mixed doubles |
| Gold medal – first place | 1999 Kuala Lumpur | Mixed doubles |
| Gold medal – first place | 2001 Manila | Mixed doubles |
| Gold medal – first place | 2003 Jakarta | Women's doubles |
| Gold medal – first place | 2004 Kuala Lumpur | Mixed doubles |
| Silver medal – second place | 1999 Kuala Lumpur | Women's doubles |
| Bronze medal – third place | 1992 Kuala Lumpur | Women's singles |
Asian Cup
| Gold medal – first place | 1996 Seoul | Mixed doubles |

- Ra Kyung-min
- Hangul: 나경민
- Hanja: 羅景民
- RR: Na Gyeongmin
- MR: Na Kyŏngmin

Ra Kyung-min (Korean: 라경민; Hanja: 羅景民; born 25 November 1976) is a badminton player from South Korea. Ra was a dominating mixed doubles team with her partner Kim Dong-moon from the late 1990s to early 2000s, resulting in a 70–match winning streak and 14 consecutive titles in international tournaments.

== Career ==
Ra made her debut at the Olympic Games in Atlanta 1996. She played in the women's singles and mixed doubles event. In the singles, she was defeated by Huang Chia-chi of Chinese Taipei in the first round with the score of 6–11, 7–11. In the mixed doubles, she competed with her senior Park Joo-bong, reaching in to the final round and settled for the silver medal after beaten by their compatriot Kim Dong-moon and Gil Young-ah in rubber games, 15–13, 4–15, and 12–15.

Ra made her second appearance at the Olympic Games in Sydney 2000. Competed as the third seed in the women's doubles with Chung Jae-hee, they lost in the semi-final match against Huang Nanyan and Yang Wei of China, and again lost to another Chinese pair in the bronze medal match Gao Ling and Qin Yiyuan. In the mixed doubles, she competed as second seed with Kim Dong-moon, reaching in to the quarter-final round, defeated by Zhang Jun and Gao Ling.

Ra competed for Korea in 2004 Summer Olympics in women's doubles with partner Lee Kyung-won. They had a bye in the first round and defeated Pernille Harder and Mette Schjoldager of Denmark in the second. In the quarterfinals, Ra and Lee beat Mia Audina and Lotte Bruil of the Netherlands 15–5, 15–2. They lost the semifinal to Yang Wei and Zhang Jiewen of China 6–15, 4–15, but won the bronze medal match against Wei Yili and Zhao Tingting, also of China, 10–15, 15–9, 15–7. She also competed in mixed doubles with partner Kim Dong-moon. They had a bye in the first round and defeated Chris Bruil and Lotte Bruil of the Netherlands in the second. In the quarterfinals, Ra and Kim lost to Jonas Rasmussen and Rikke Olsen of Denmark 14–17, 8–15.

Ra was inducted into the Badminton Hall of Fame in 2009.

== Record ==
Ra Kyung-min holds the world record for shortest badminton international match that last for just six minutes defeating Julia Mann of England in women's singles during the 1996 Uber Cup with 11–2, 11–1.

== Personal life ==
She married her mixed doubles partner Kim on 25 December 2005, and they went to Canada to study. There they had a son named Kim Han-wool in July 2007, and a daughter named Kim Han-bi in 2008. She retired when she got pregnant in February 2007, and made a comeback in September 2009.

== Achievements ==
=== Olympic Games ===
Women's doubles
| Year | Venue | Partner | Opponent | Score | Result |
|---|---|---|---|---|---|
| 2004 | Goudi Olympic Hall, Athens, Greece | (South Korea) Lee Kyung-won | (China) Wei Yili (China) Zhao Tingting | 10–15, 15–9, 15–7 | Bronze |

Mixed doubles
| Year | Venue | Partner | Opponent | Score | Result |
|---|---|---|---|---|---|
| 1996 | GSU Sports Arena, Atlanta, United States | (South Korea) Park Joo-bong | (South Korea) Kim Dong-moon (South Korea) Gil Young-ah | 15–13, 4–15, 12–15 | Silver |

=== World Championships ===
Women's doubles
| Year | Venue | Partner | Opponent | Score | Result |
|---|---|---|---|---|---|
| 1999 | Brøndby Arena, Copenhagen, Denmark | (South Korea) Chung Jae-hee | (China) Ge Fei (China) Gu Jun | 4–15, 5–15 | Silver |
| 2001 | Palacio de Deportes de San Pablo, Seville, Spain | (South Korea) Lee Kyung-won | (China) Wei Yili (China) Zhang Jiewen | 11–15, 3–15 | Bronze |

Mixed doubles
| Year | Venue | Partner | Opponent | Score | Result |
|---|---|---|---|---|---|
| 1999 | Brøndby Arena, Copenhagen, Denmark | (South Korea) Kim Dong-moon | (England) Simon Archer (England) Joanne Goode | 15–10, 15–13 | Gold |
| 2001 | Palacio de Deportes de San Pablo, Seville, Spain | (South Korea) Kim Dong-moon | (China) Zhang Jun (China) Gao Ling | 10–15, 15–12, 16–17 | Silver |
| 2003 | National Indoor Arena, Birmingham, United Kingdom | (South Korea) Kim Dong-moon | (China) Zhang Jun (China) Gao Ling | 15–7, 15–8 | Gold |

=== Asian Games ===
Women's doubles
| Year | Venue | Partner | Opponent | Score | Result |
|---|---|---|---|---|---|
| 1998 | Thammasat Gymnasium 2, Bangkok, Thailand | (South Korea) Chung Jae-hee | (China) Ge Fei (China) Gu Jun | 11–15, 9–15 | Bronze |
| 2002 | Gangseo Gymnasium, Busan, South Korea | (South Korea) Lee Kyung-won | (China) Gao Ling (China) Huang Sui | 11–8, 11–7 | Gold |

Mixed doubles
| Year | Venue | Partner | Opponent | Score | Result |
|---|---|---|---|---|---|
| 1998 | Thammasat Gymnasium 2, Bangkok, Thailand | (South Korea) Kim Dong-moon | (South Korea) Lee Dong-soo (South Korea) Yim Kyung-jin | 15–6, 15–8 | Gold |
| 2002 | Gangseo Gymnasium, Busan, South Korea | (South Korea) Kim Dong-moon | (Thailand) Khunakorn Sudhisodhi (Thailand) Saralee Thungthongkam | 11–4, 11–0 | Gold |

=== Asian Championships ===
Women's singles
| Year | Venue | Opponent | Score | Result |
|---|---|---|---|---|
| 1992 | Cheras Indoor Stadium, Kuala Lumpur, Malaysia | (China) Zhou Lei | 12–10, 8–11, 5–11 | Bronze |

Women's doubles
| Year | Venue | Partner | Opponent | Score | Result |
|---|---|---|---|---|---|
| 1999 | Kuala Lumpur Badminton Stadium, Kuala Lumpur, Malaysia | (South Korea) Chung Jae-hee | (China) Ge Fei (China) Gu Jun | 8–15, 10–15 | Silver |
| 2003 | Tennis Indoor Gelora Bung Karno, Jakarta, Indonesia | (South Korea) Lee Kyung-won | (South Korea) Hwang Yu-mi (South Korea) Lee Hyo-jung | 15–9, 15–7 | Gold |

Mixed doubles
| Year | Venue | Partner | Opponent | Score | Result |
|---|---|---|---|---|---|
| 1998 | Nimibutr Stadium, Bangkok, Thailand | (South Korea) Kim Dong-moon | (China) Sun Jun (China) Ge Fei | 15–7, 15–8 | Gold |
| 1999 | Kuala Lumpur Badminton Stadium, Kuala Lumpur, Malaysia | (South Korea) Kim Dong-moon | (China) Liu Yong (China) Ge Fei | 15–7, 15–13 | Gold |
| 2001 | PhilSports Arena, Manila, Philippines | (South Korea) Kim Dong-moon | (Indonesia) Bambang Suprianto (Indonesia) Minarti Timur | 11–15, 15–4, 15–3 | Gold |
| 2004 | Kuala Lumpur Badminton Stadium, Kuala Lumpur, Malaysia | (South Korea) Kim Dong-moon | (Thailand) Sudket Prapakamol (Thailand) Saralee Thungthongkam | 15–10, 17–16 | Gold |

=== Asian Cup ===
Mixed doubles
| Year | Venue | Partner | Opponent | Score | Result |
|---|---|---|---|---|---|
| 1996 | Olympic Gymnasium No. 2, Seoul, South Korea | (South Korea) Park Joo-bong | (South Korea) Kang Kyung-jin (South Korea) Kim Mee-hyang | 15–6, 15–8 | Gold |

=== IBF World Grand Prix (56 titles, 9 runners-up) ===
The World Badminton Grand Prix sanctioned by International Badminton Federation (IBF) from 1983 to 2006.

Women's singles
| Year | Tournament | Opponent | Score | Result |
|---|---|---|---|---|
| 1994 | Singapore Open | (Indonesia) Yuliani Sentosa | 12–9, 11–5 | (gold) Winner |
| 1995 | Canadian Open | (South Korea) Bang Soo-hyun | 0–11, 7–11 | (silver) Runner-up |
| 1995 | Thailand Open | (Sweden) Lim Xiaoqing | 4–11, 0–11 | (silver) Runner-up |
| 1996 | Swedish Open | (China) Zhang Ning | 11–6, 2–11, 4–11 | (silver) Runner-up |
| 1997 | Swedish Open | (China) Gong Zhichao | 4–11, 4–11 | (silver) Runner-up |
| 2001 | U.S. Open | (Denmark) Mette Sørensen | 6–8, 7–4, 7–3, 7–2 | (gold) Winner |

Women's doubles
| Year | Tournament | Partner | Opponent | Score | Result |
|---|---|---|---|---|---|
| 1997 | Hong Kong Open | (South Korea) Chung Jae-hee | (China) Liu Lu (China) Qian Hong | 15–7, 15–12 | (gold) Winner |
| 1998 | Swedish Open | (South Korea) Jang Hye-ock | (China) Huang Nanyan (China) Liu Zhong | 15–12, 15–9 | (gold) Winner |
| 1998 | All England Open | (South Korea) Jang Hye-ock | (China) Ge Fei (China) Gu Jun | 7–15, 7–15 | (silver) Runner-up |
| 1999 | Swedish Open | (South Korea) Chung Jae-hee | (China) Huang Sui (China) Lu Ying | 15–6, 15–11 | (gold) Winner |
| 1999 | All England Open | (South Korea) Chung Jae-hee | (China) Huang Sui (China) Lu Ying | 15–6, 15–8 | (gold) Winner |
| 1999 | World Grand Prix Finals | (South Korea) Chung Jae-hee | (China) Ge Fei (China) Gu Jun | 2–15, 4–15 | (silver) Runner-up |
| 2000 | Korea Open | (South Korea) Chung Jae-hee | (China) Huang Nanyan (China) Yang Wei | 15–6, 8–15, 15–5 | (gold) Winner |
| 2000 | Chinese Taipei Open | (South Korea) Chung Jae-hee | (Denmark) Helene Kirkegaard (Denmark) Rikke Olsen | 15–9, 15–7 | (gold) Winner |
| 2000 | All England Open | (South Korea) Chung Jae-hee | (China) Ge Fei (China) Gu Jun | 5–15, 3–15 | (silver) Runner-up |
| 2001 | Korea Open | (South Korea) Kim Kyeung-ran | (China) Huang Nanyan (China) Yang Wei | 13–15, 10–15 | (silver) Runner-up |
| 2001 | Swiss Open | (South Korea) Lee Kyung-won | (Denmark) Helene Kirkegaard (Denmark) Rikke Olsen | 7–3, 8–6, 2–7, 7–4 | (gold) Winner |
| 2001 | U.S. Open | (South Korea) Kim Kyeung-ran | (Denmark) Pernille Harder (Denmark) Majken Vange | 7–1, 7–0, 7–3 | (gold) Winner |
| 2002 | Swiss Open | (South Korea) Lee Kyung-won | (England) Gail Emms (Netherlands) Lotte Jonathans | 7–1, 7–1, 7–1 | (gold) Winner |
| 2002 | Japan Open | (South Korea) Lee Kyung-won | (China) Gao Ling (China) Huang Sui | 7–5, 1–7, 7–2, 6–8, 7–1 | (gold) Winner |
| 2003 | Korea Open | (South Korea) Lee Kyung-won | (Denmark) Ann-Lou Jørgensen (Denmark) Rikke Olsen | 11–5, 11–5 | (gold) Winner |
| 2003 | Dutch Open | (South Korea) Lee Kyung-won | (South Korea) Hwang Yu-mi (South Korea) Lee Hyo-jung | 15–4, 15–9 | (gold) Winner |
| 2003 | German Open | (South Korea) Lee Kyung-won | (China) Yang Wei (China) Zhang Jiewen | 15–6, 15–17, 15–8 | (gold) Winner |
| 2003 | Chinese Taipei Open | (South Korea) Lee Kyung-won | (South Korea) Hwang Yu-mi (South Korea) Lee Hyo-jung | 15–9, 15–8 | (gold) Winner |
| 2004 | Korea Open | (South Korea) Lee Kyung-won | (China) Yang Wei (China) Zhang Jiewen | 8–15, 15–9, 6–15 | (silver) Runner-up |
| 2004 | Japan Open | (South Korea) Lee Kyung-won | (China) Wei Yili (China) Zhao Tingting | 15–6, 5–15, 15–1 | (gold) Winner |

Mixed doubles
| Year | Tournament | Partner | Opponent | Score | Result |
|---|---|---|---|---|---|
| 1995 | Thailand Open | (South Korea) Park Joo-bong | (Russia) Nikolai Zuyev (Russia) Marina Yakusheva | 15–1, 15–4 | (gold) Winner |
| 1996 | Japan Open | (South Korea) Park Joo-bong | (South Korea) Kim Dong-moon (South Korea) Gil Young-ah | 15–7, 15–1 | (gold) Winner |
| 1996 | Korea Open | (South Korea) Park Joo-bong | (England) Simon Archer (England) Julie Bradbury | 15–9, 15–11 | (gold) Winner |
| 1996 | Swedish Open | (South Korea) Park Joo-bong | (China) Chen Xingdong (China) Peng Xinyong | 15–4, 15–6 | (gold) Winner |
| 1996 | All England Open | (South Korea) Park Joo-bong | (England) Simon Archer (England) Julie Bradbury | 15–10, 15–10 | (gold) Winner |
| 1997 | U.S. Open | (South Korea) Kim Dong-moon | (Indonesia) Bambang Suprianto (Indonesia) Rosalina Riseu | 15–1, 15–3 | (gold) Winner |
| 1997 | Hong Kong Open | (South Korea) Kim Dong-moon | (South Korea) Ha Tae-kwon (South Korea) Chung Jae-hee | 15–12, 15–3 | (gold) Winner |
| 1997 | China Open | (South Korea) Kim Dong-moon | (China) Liu Yong (China) Ge Fei | 15–10, 15–6 | (gold) Winner |
| 1998 | Japan Open | (South Korea) Kim Dong-moon | (Denmark) Jens Eriksen (Denmark) Marlene Thomsen | 15–12, 15–9 | (gold) Winner |
| 1998 | Swedish Open | (South Korea) Kim Dong-moon | (China) Chen Gang (China) Tang Yongshu | 15–3, 15–3 | (gold) Winner |
| 1998 | All England Open | (South Korea) Kim Dong-moon | (Denmark) Michael Søgaard (Denmark) Rikke Olsen | 15–2, 11–15, 15–5 | (gold) Winner |
| 1998 | World Grand Prix Finals | (South Korea) Kim Dong-moon | (England) Simon Archer (England) Joanne Goode | 15–6, 15–9 | (gold) Winner |
| 1999 | Korea Open | (South Korea) Kim Dong-moon | (China) Liu Yong (China) Ge Fei | 15–6, 15–8 | (gold) Winner |
| 1999 | Swedish Open | (South Korea) Kim Dong-moon | (South Korea) Ha Tae-kwon (South Korea) Chung Jae-hee | 15–1, 15–4 | (gold) Winner |
| 1999 | Singapore Open | (South Korea) Kim Dong-moon | (Denmark) Michael Søgaard (Denmark) Rikke Olsen | 15–4, 15–8 | (gold) Winner |
| 1999 | World Grand Prix Finals | (South Korea) Kim Dong-moon | (Indonesia) Tri Kusharjanto (Indonesia) Minarti Timur | 15–5, 15–7 | (gold) Winner |
| 2000 | Korea Open | (South Korea) Kim Dong-moon | (Indonesia) Tri Kusharjanto (Indonesia) Minarti Timur | 15–13, 15–3 | (gold) Winner |
| 2000 | All England Open | (South Korea) Kim Dong-moon | (China) Liu Yong (China) Ge Fei | 15–10, 15–2 | (gold) Winner |
| 2000 | Swiss Open | (South Korea) Kim Dong-moon | (China) Zhang Jun (China) Gao Ling | 15–8, 15–9 | (gold) Winner |
| 2000 | Malaysia Open | (South Korea) Kim Dong-moon | (Indonesia) Tri Kusharjanto (Indonesia) Minarti Timur | 15–7, 15–8 | (gold) Winner |
| 2001 | Korea Open | (South Korea) Kim Dong-moon | (China) Zhang Jun (China) Gao Ling | 15–8, 15–11 | (gold) Winner |
| 2001 | Hong Kong Open | (South Korea) Kim Dong-moon | (Thailand) Khunakorn Sudhisodhi (Thailand) Saralee Thungthongkam | 3–7, 7–0, 7–2, 7–2 | (gold) Winner |
| 2002 | All England Open | (South Korea) Kim Dong-moon | (Denmark) Jens Eriksen (Denmark) Mette Schjoldager | 7–3, 7–3, 7–0 | (gold) Winner |
| 2002 | Swiss Open | (South Korea) Kim Dong-moon | (Denmark) Jonas Rasmussen (Denmark) Jane F. Bramsen | 7–3, 7–5, 1–7, 7–4 | (gold) Winner |
| 2002 | Korea Open | (South Korea) Kim Dong-moon | (Denmark) Michael Søgaard (Denmark) Rikke Olsen | 7–1, 7–3, 7–5 | (gold) Winner |
| 2002 | Japan Open | (South Korea) Kim Dong-moon | (Indonesia) Nova Widianto (Indonesia) Vita Marissa | 7–3, 7–2, 7–2 | (gold) Winner |
| 2002 | Singapore Open | (South Korea) Kim Dong-moon | (England) Nathan Robertson (England) Gail Emms | 11–2, 13–10 | (gold) Winner |
| 2003 | Korea Open | (South Korea) Kim Dong-moon | (South Korea) Kim Yong-hyun (South Korea) Lee Hyo-jung | 11–5, 11–4 | (gold) Winner |
| 2003 | Singapore Open | (South Korea) Kim Dong-moon | (China) Zheng Bo (China) Zhang Jiewen | 15–5, 15–9 | (gold) Winner |
| 2003 | Indonesia Open | (South Korea) Kim Dong-moon | (China) Zhang Jun (China) Gao Ling | 10–15, 15–11, 15–6 | (gold) Winner |
| 2003 | Malaysia Open | (South Korea) Kim Dong-moon | (England) Nathan Robertson (England) Gail Emms | 15–6, 15–5 | (gold) Winner |
| 2003 | Dutch Open | (South Korea) Kim Dong-moon | (South Korea) Kim Yong-hyun (South Korea) Lee Hyo-jung | 15–4, 15–2 | (gold) Winner |
| 2003 | Denmark Open | (South Korea) Kim Dong-moon | (South Korea) Kim Yong-hyun (South Korea) Lee Hyo-jung | 17–16, 15–10 | (gold) Winner |
| 2003 | German Open | (South Korea) Kim Dong-moon | (China) Zhang Jun (China) Gao Ling | 15–12, 11–15, 15–8 | (gold) Winner |
| 2003 | Hong Kong Open | (South Korea) Kim Dong-moon | (China) Zhang Jun (China) Gao Ling | 15–7, 15–10 | (gold) Winner |
| 2003 | Chinese Taipei Open | (South Korea) Kim Dong-moon | (Indonesia) Nova Widianto (Indonesia) Vita Marissa | 15–7, 15–5 | (gold) Winner |
| 2004 | Swiss Open | (South Korea) Kim Dong-moon | (China) Zhang Jun (China) Gao Ling | 15–2, 15–8 | (gold) Winner |
| 2004 | All England Open | (South Korea) Kim Dong-moon | (South Korea) Kim Yong-hyun (South Korea) Lee Hyo-jung | 15–8, 17–15 | (gold) Winner |
| 2004 | Korea Open | (South Korea) Kim Dong-moon | (South Korea) Kim Yong-hyun (South Korea) Lee Hyo-jung | 15–5, 15–11 | (gold) Winner |

=== IBF International (2 titles, 4 runners-up) ===
Women's singles
| Year | Tournament | Opponent | Score | Result |
|---|---|---|---|---|
| 1991 | Hungarian International | (South Korea) Park Soo-yun | 0–11, 4–11 | (silver) Runner-up |
| 1992 | Wimbledon Open | (England) Fiona Smith | 2–11, 11–8, 4–11 | (silver) Runner-up |

Women's doubles
| Year | Tournament | Partner | Opponent | Score | Result |
|---|---|---|---|---|---|
| 1991 | Hungarian International | (South Korea) Choi Ma-ree | (South Korea) Kim Shin-young (South Korea) Park Soo-yun | 9–15, 6–15 | (silver) Runner-up |
| 1999 | Australian International | (South Korea) Lee Hyo-jung | (South Korea) Chung Jae-hee (South Korea) Yim Kyung-jin | 17–16, 6–15, 15–3 | (gold) Winner |
| 2005 | Canadian International | (South Korea) Jun Woul-sik | (South Korea) Ha Jung-eun (South Korea) Oh Seul-ki | 15–5, 15–9 | (gold) Winner |

Mixed doubles
| Year | Tournament | Partner | Opponent | Score | Result |
|---|---|---|---|---|---|
| 1991 | Hungarian International | (South Korea) Hwang Sun-ho | (South Korea) Kim Young-gil (South Korea) Park Soo-yun | 3–15, 12–15 | (silver) Runner-up |
