= Lee Joo-hyun =

Korean-born American badminton player

Johanna Lee
Personal information
- Born: Lee Joo-hyun; March 13, 1974 (age 52) Masan, Changwon, South Korea

Sport
- Country: United States
- Sport: Badminton
- Event: Women's singles & doubles

Women's singles & doubles
- BWF profile
Medal record
Women's badminton
Representing South Korea
Sudirman Cup
Silver medal – second place	1997 Glasgow	Mixed team
Uber Cup
Bronze medal – third place	1998 Hong Kong	Women's team
Bronze medal – third place	1996 Hong Kong	Women's team
Bronze medal – third place	1994 Jakarta	Women's team
Asian Games
Silver medal – second place	1998 Bangkok	Women's team
Bronze medal – third place	1998 Bangkok	Women's singles
Asian Championships
Silver medal – second place	1996 Surabaya	Women's singles
East Asian Games
Gold medal – first place	1997 Busan	Women's singles
Silver medal – second place	1997 Busan	Women's team

Lee Joo-hyun (Korean: 이주현; also known as Johanna Lee; born March 13, 1974, in Masan district, Changwon is a retired female badminton player originally from South Korea who later moved to play for United States. She won U.S. National Championships for 10 times.

== Achievements ==
=== Asian Games ===
Women's singles
Year	Venue	Opponent	Score	Result
1998	Thammasat Gymnasium 2 Bangkok, Thailand	(China) Gong Zhichao	11–6, 4–11, 4–11	Bronze

=== Asian Championships ===
Women's singles
Year	Venue	Opponent	Score	Result
1996	Surabaya, Indonesia	(China) Gong Zhichao	7–11, 1–11	Silver

=== East Asian Games ===
Women's singles
Year	Venue	Opponent	Score	Result
1997	Pukyong National University Gymnasium; Busan, South Korea	(Japan) Takako Ida	11–8, 11–5	Gold

=== IBF Grand Prix ===
Women's singles
Year	Tournament	Opponent	Score	Result
2006	US Open	(Russia) Ella Karachkova	6–11^{r}	(silver) Runner-up

Women's doubles
Year	Tournament	Partner	Opponent	Score	Result
2005	US Open	(United States) Peng Yun	(New Zealand) Rachel Hindley (New Zealand) Rebecca Bellingham	15–5, 15–9	(gold) Winner

=== IBF International ===
Women's doubles
Year	Tournament	Partner	Opponent	Score	Result
2005	USA SCBA International	(United States) Peng Yun	(Japan) Miyuki Tai (Japan) Noriko Okuma	15–11, 13–15, 15–11	(gold) Winner
