= Luo Yigang =

Chinese badminton player

Luo Yigang 罗毅刚
Personal information
- Born: March 22, 1975 (age 51) Hunan, China
- Height: 180 cm (5 ft 11 in)

Sport
- Country: China
- Sport: Badminton
- Handedness: Right

Men's singles
- Highest ranking: 3 (in 1998)
- BWF profile
Medal record
Representing China
Men's badminton
Thomas Cup
Silver medal – second place	2000 Kuala Lumpur	Men's team
Bronze medal – third place	1998 Hong Kong	Men's team
Asian Games
Silver medal – second place	1998 Bangkok	Men's team
Asian Championships
Silver medal – second place	1996 Surabaya	Men's singles
Bronze medal – third place	1998 Bangkok	Men's singles
Asian Cup
Silver medal – second place	1996 Seoul	Men's singles

Luo Yigang (Chinese: 罗毅刚; pinyin: Luō Yìgāng; born 22 March 1975) is a retired Chinese badminton player and currently serving as the national badminton coach of the Chinese team.

== Career ==
Luo Yigang is a former star in China's men's singles. He has a high savvy, comprehensive technique and steady style of play. He can often give full play to his level in the game. After starting badminton at the age of 9, Yigang entered the Hunan team when he turned 13. Luo made China's B team at the beginning of 1996, and the A team a few months later. In 96, he won the silver medal in the Asian Championships, losing the final to Indonesia's Jeffer Rosobin. He qualified for 1997 World Badminton Grand Prix Finals. 1998 was his best year as he won the Swedish Open and was a semi-finalist at the All England. Besides this he won another medal at the Asian Championships and again qualified for year-end Grand Prix Finals. In 1999, he won the Malaysian Open and finished as semifinalist spot in Korean Open. In 2001, he won National Championships by beating Lin Dan in the final. His last match was played in Paris, where he won the 2002 French Open, then an International Challenge tournament where afterwards he retired from National team. His best achievement in a team event was a silver medal in the 1998 Asian Games in Bangkok and a silver at 2000 Thomas Cup.

After leaving the national team, Luo Yigang spent more than half a year in the Hunan provincial team. In 2003, after obtaining the permission of the Hunan provincial team and the national team, he chose to go to Denmark to develop and teach in a badminton club in Copenhagen. He also represented Club competition there. In 2005, he returned to Hunan provincial team to start coaching the players. By 2007, he was selected as a coach in National Youth training team. In 2018, he replaced Zhang Ning as National Women's singles team coach after a poor showing in Uber Cup. He is currently coaching Chinese Women's singles players.

== Achievements ==
=== Asian Championships ===
Men's singles
Year	Venue	Opponent	Score	Result
1998	Bangkok, Thailand	(China) Chen Gang	5–15, 8–15	Bronze
1996	Surabaya, Indonesia	(Indonesia) Jeffer Rosobin	15–9, 7–15, 5–15	Silver

=== Asian Cup ===
Men's singles
Year	Venue	Opponent	Score	Result
1996	Olympic Gymnasium No. 2 Seoul, South Korea	(Malaysia) Rashid Sidek	14–18, 5–15	Silver

=== IBF World Grand Prix ===
The World Badminton Grand Prix sanctioned by International Badminton Federation (IBF) from 1983 to 2006.

Men's singles
Year	Tournament	Opponent	Score	Result
1999	Malaysia Open	(Malaysia) Wong Choong Hann	17–16, 17–15	(gold) Winner
1998	Swedish Open	(China) Chen Gang	18–14, 15–2	(gold) Winner
1998	Japan Open	(Denmark) Peter Gade	3–15, 11–15	(silver) Runner-up
1997	China Open	(China) Dong Jiong	10–15, 2–15	(silver) Runner-up
1996	China Open	(Chinese Taipei) Fung Permadi	12–15, 9–15	(silver) Runner-up

=== IBF International ===
Men's singles
Year	Tournament	Opponent	Score	Result
2002	French International	(China) Wu Yunyong	7–5, 8–7, 7–4	(gold) Winner
