= Swedish Open (badminton) =

International badminton tournament

- Status: Revived since 2018
- Genre: sports event
- Frequency: annual
- Location: various
- Country: Sweden
- Inaugurated: 1967
- Most recent: 2025
- Organiser: Badminton Sweden

The Swedish Open is an open badminton tournament that is annually held since 2018, previously from 1956 to 2000 after which the organizer, Svenska Badmintonförbundet, could no longer find a suitable sponsor. To some extent it has been replaced by the Swedish International Stockholm tournament.

Between 2004 and 2017 it was replaced by Swedish International / Swedish Masters Badminton Championships. The name is re-used since 2018.

== Winners ==
Year	Men's singles	Women's singles	Men's doubles	Women's doubles	Mixed doubles	Ref
1956	(Sweden) Leif Ekedahl	(Denmark) Aase Schiøtt Jacobsen	(Sweden) Berndt Dahlberg (Sweden) Bertil Glans	(Denmark) Anni Jørgensen (Denmark) Kirsten Thorndahl	(Denmark) Jørgen Hammergaard Hansen (Denmark) Anni Jørgensen	
1957	(Denmark) Finn Kobberø	(Denmark) Inger Kjærgaard	(Denmark) Jørgen Hammergaard Hansen (Denmark) Finn Kobberø	(England) Iris Rogers (England) June Timperley	(England) Tony Jordan (England) June Timperley	
1958	(Denmark) Finn Kobberø	(Denmark) Inger Kjærgaard	(Denmark) Ole Mertz (Denmark) Poul-Erik Nielsen	(Denmark) Kirsten Granlund (Denmark) Anni Hammergaard Hansen	(Denmark) Jørgen Hammergaard Hansen (Denmark) Anni Hammergaard Hansen	
1959	(Sweden) Berndt Dahlberg	(Denmark) Hanne Jensen	(Sweden) Berndt Dahlberg (Sweden) Bertil Glans	(Denmark) Hanne Jensen (Denmark) Inger Kjærgaard	(Sweden) Bertil Glans (Sweden) Berit Olsson	
1960	(Sweden) Berndt Dahlberg	(Sweden) Eva Pettersson	(Denmark) Finn Kobberø (Denmark) Poul-Erik Nielsen	(Sweden) Ingrid Dahlberg (Sweden) Berit Olsson	(Denmark) Poul-Erik Nielsen (Sweden) Bodil Sterner	
1961	(Sweden) Leif Ekedahl	(Denmark) Tonny Holst-Christensen	(England) Tony Jordan (England) Peter J. Wadell	(Denmark) Hanne Andersen (Denmark) Tonny Holst-Christensen	(Denmark) Bjørn Holst-Christensen (Denmark) Tonny Holst-Christensen	
1962	(Denmark) Erland Kops	(Denmark) Ulla Rasmussen	(Denmark) Jørgen Hammergaard Hansen (Denmark) Finn Kobberø	(Denmark) Bente Kristiansen (Denmark) Aase Winther	(Denmark) Finn Kobberø (Denmark) Anni Hammergaard Hansen	
1963	(Denmark) Erland Kops	(England) Ursula Smith	(Denmark) Henning Borch (Denmark) Knud Aage Nielsen	(Denmark) Karin Jørgensen (Denmark) Ulla Rasmussen	(Denmark) Poul-Erik Nielsen (Denmark) Ulla Rasmussen	
1964	(Denmark) Erland Kops	(United States) Judy Hashman	(Denmark) Jørgen Hammergaard Hansen (Denmark) Finn Kobberø	(United States) Judy Hashman (Republic of Ireland) Mary O'Sullivan	(Denmark) Finn Kobberø (Denmark) Anne Flindt	
1965	(Denmark) Erland Kops	(Sweden) Eva Twedberg	(Denmark) Erland Kops (Denmark) Knud Aage Nielsen	(Denmark) Karin Jørgensen (Denmark) Ulla Rasmussen	(Denmark) Henning Borch (Denmark) Ulla Rasmussen	
1966	(Denmark) Svend Andersen	(United States) Judy Hashman	(Denmark) Henning Borch (Denmark) Jørgen Herlevsen	(United States) Judy Hashman (Sweden) Eva Twedberg	(Denmark) Per Walsøe (Denmark) Pernille Mølgaard Hansen	
1967	(Denmark) Svend Andersen	(Denmark) Ulla Strand	(Denmark) Svend Andersen (Denmark) Per Walsøe	(Denmark) Lonny Funch (Denmark) Ulla Strand	(Denmark) Per Walsøe (Denmark) Pernille Mølgaard Hansen	
1968	(Denmark) Svend Andersen	(Sweden) Eva Twedberg	(Denmark) Henning Borch (Denmark) Erland Kops	(Denmark) Lonny Funch (Denmark) Ulla Strand	(Denmark) Svend Andersen (Denmark) Ulla Strand	
1969	(Denmark) Svend Andersen	(England) Gillian Perrin	(Denmark) Svend Andersen (Denmark) Erland Kops	(England) Margaret Boxall (England) Susan Whetnall	(England) Roger Mills (England) Gillian Perrin	
1970	(Denmark) Svend Pri	(Sweden) Eva Twedberg	(Denmark) Svend Pri (Denmark) Per Walsøe	(England) Margaret Boxall (England) Gillian Perrin	(Denmark) Per Walsøe (Denmark) Pernille Mølgaard Hansen	
1971	(Denmark) Elo Hansen	(Sweden) Eva Twedberg	(Denmark) Svend Pri (Denmark) Per Walsøe	(England) Margaret Beck (England) Gillian Gilks	(England) Derek Talbot (England) Gillian Gilks	
1972	(Denmark) Svend Pri	(Sweden) Eva Twedberg	(Denmark) Erland Kops (Denmark) Svend Pri	(England) Margaret Beck (England) Gillian Gilks	(England) David Eddy (England) Gillian Gilks	
1973	(Denmark) Svend Pri	(Sweden) Eva Twedberg	(Denmark) Poul Petersen (Denmark) Svend Pri	(England) Margaret Beck (England) Gillian Gilks	(England) Derek Talbot (England) Gillian Gilks	
1974	(Sweden) Sture Johnsson	(Denmark) Lene Køppen	(West Germany) Karl-Heinz Garbers (West Germany) Gerhard Kucki	(England) Barbara Giles (England) Heather Nielsen	(West Germany) Roland Maywald (West Germany) Brigitte Steden	
1975	(Denmark) Svend Pri	(Denmark) Lene Køppen	(England) Ray Stevens (England) Mike Tredgett	(England) Barbara Giles (England) Susan Whetnall	(England) Mike Tredgett (England) Nora Perry	
1976	(Sweden) Sture Johnsson	(England) Gillian Gilks	(Denmark) Flemming Delfs (Denmark) Elo Hansen	(England) Margaret Beck (England) Gillian Gilks	(Denmark) Steen Skovgaard (Denmark) Lene Køppen	
1977	(Indonesia) Liem Swie King	(Denmark) Lene Køppen	(Indonesia) Ade Chandra (Indonesia) Tjun Tjun	(England) Barbara Giles (England) Gillian Gilks	(England) Derek Talbot (England) Gillian Gilks	
1978	(Denmark) Svend Pri	(Denmark) Lene Køppen	(Denmark) Flemming Delfs (Denmark) Steen Skovgaard	(England) Nora Perry (England) Anne Statt	(England) Mike Tredgett (England) Nora Perry	
1979	(Denmark) Flemming Delfs	(Denmark) Lene Køppen	(Denmark) Flemming Delfs (Denmark) Steen Skovgaard	(Netherlands) Joke van Beusekom (Denmark) Lene Køppen	(England) Mike Tredgett (England) Nora Perry	
1980	(India) Prakash Padukone	(Japan) Yoshiko Yonekura	(Indonesia) Ade Chandra (Indonesia) Christian Hadinata	(Japan) Atsuko Tokuda (Japan) Yoshiko Yonekura	(Sweden) Lars Wengberg (Sweden) Anette Börjesson	
1981	(Indonesia) Lius Pongoh	(South Korea) Hwang Sun-ai	(Sweden) Stefan Karlsson (Sweden) Thomas Kihlström	(England) Nora Perry (England) Sally Leadbeater	(Scotland) Billy Gilliland (England) Nora Perry	
1982	(Malaysia) Misbun Sidek	(China) Wu Dixi	(Indonesia) Christian Hadinata (Indonesia) Lius Pongoh	(China) Xu Rong (China) Wu Jianqiu	(England) Duncan Bridge (England) Gillian Clark	
1983	(Malaysia) Misbun Sidek	(England) Helen Troke	(Denmark) Steen Fladberg (Denmark) Jesper Helledie	(England) Nora Perry (England) Jane Webster	(Sweden) Thomas Kihlström (England) Nora Perry	
1984	(Denmark) Jens Peter Nierhoff	(Japan) Fumiko Tookairin	(South Korea) Park Joo-bong (South Korea) Kim Moon-soo	(South Korea) Kim Yun-ja (South Korea) Yoo Sang-hee	(Sweden) Thomas Kihlström (Sweden) Maria Bengtsson	
1985	(China) Han Jian	(China) Han Aiping	(China) Li Yongbo (China) Ding Qiqing	(China) Li Lingwei (China) Han Aiping	(Sweden) Stefan Karlsson (Sweden) Maria Bengtsson	
1986–1987	not held					
1988	(China) Xiong Guobao	(China) Han Aiping	(China) Li Yongbo (China) Tian Bingyi	(China) Lin Ying (China) Guan Weizhen	(China) Wang Pengren (China) Shi Fangjing	
1989	(Denmark) Morten Frost	(China) Li Lingwei	(China) Li Yongbo (China) Tian Bingyi	(South Korea) Chung Myung-hee (South Korea) Chung So-young	(South Korea) Park Joo-bong (South Korea) Chung Myung-hee	
1990	(China) Liu Jun	(China) Huang Hua	(China) Li Yongbo (China) Tian Bingyi	(China) Huang Hua (China) Zhou Lei	(Sweden) Jan-Eric Antonsson (Sweden) Maria Bengtsson	
1991	(Indonesia) Ardy Wiranata	(Indonesia) Susi Susanti	(Malaysia) Cheah Soon Kit (Malaysia) Soo Beng Kiang	(England) Gillian Clark (Denmark) Nettie Nielsen	(Denmark) Thomas Lund (Denmark) Pernille Dupont	
1992	(Denmark) Poul-Erik Høyer Larsen	(China) Tang Jiuhong	(China) Chen Hongyong (China) Chen Kang	(China) Yao Fen (China) Lin Yanfen	(Sweden) Pär-Gunnar Jönsson (Sweden) Maria Bengtsson	
1993	(Denmark) Thomas Stuer-Lauridsen	(South Korea) Bang Soo-hyun	(Indonesia) Rexy Mainaky (Indonesia) Ricky Subagja	| (South Korea) Chung So-young (South Korea) Gil Young-ah	(Denmark) Thomas Lund (Sweden) Catrine Bengtsson	
1994	(Sweden) Jens Olsson	(South Korea) Bang Soo-hyun	(Indonesia) Rexy Mainaky (Indonesia) Ricky Subagja	| (South Korea) Chung So-young (South Korea) Gil Young-ah	(South Korea) Yoo Yong-sung (South Korea) Jang Hye-ock	
1995	(South Korea) Park Sung-woo	(China) Ye Zhaoying	(Sweden) Pär-Gunnar Jönsson (Sweden) Peter Axelsson	(South Korea) Kim Mee-hyang (South Korea) Kim Shin-young	(China) Chen Xingdong (China) Wang Xiaoyuan	
1996	(China) Yu Lizhi	(China) Zhang Ning	(Indonesia) Candra Wijaya (Indonesia) Ade Sutrisna	(Denmark) Helene Kirkegaard (Denmark) Rikke Olsen	(South Korea) Park Joo-bong (South Korea) Ra Kyung-min	
1997	(Indonesia) Ardy Wiranata	(China) Gong Zhichao	(South Korea) Ha Tae-kwon (South Korea) Kang Kyung-jin	(China) Qiang Hong (China) Liu Lu	(Germany) Michael Keck (Netherlands) Erica van den Heuvel	
1998	(China) Luo Yigang	(South Korea) Kim Ji-hyun	(Indonesia) Candra Wijaya (Indonesia) Tony Gunawan	(South Korea) Jang Hye-ock (South Korea) Ra Kyung-min	(South Korea) Kim Dong-moon (South Korea) Ra Kyung-min	
1999	(China) Chen Hong	(China) Gong Ruina	(South Korea) Ha Tae-kwon (South Korea) Kim Dong-moon	(South Korea) Ra Kyung-min (South Korea) Chung Jae-hee	(South Korea) Kim Dong-moon (South Korea) Ra Kyung-min	
2000	(Sweden) Rasmus Wengberg	(Japan) Kanako Yonekura	(Thailand) Kitipon Kitikul (Thailand) Khunakorn Sudhisodhi	(Denmark) Pernille Harder (Denmark) Jane F. Bramsen	(Denmark) Jonas Rasmussen (Denmark) Jane F. Bramsen	
2001–2017	not held					
2018	(India) Siddharth Pratap Singh	(Denmark) Michelle Skødstrup	(New Zealand) Oliver Leydon-Davis (Denmark) Lasse Mølhede	(Sweden) Emma Karlsson (Sweden) Johanna Magnusson	(France) Thom Gicquel (France) Delphine Delrue	
2019	(Japan) Minoru Koga	(Japan) Mako Urushizaki	(Denmark) Mathias Bay-Smidt (Denmark) Lasse Mølhede	(Denmark) Amalie Magelund (Denmark) Freja Ravn	(Singapore) Danny Bawa Chrisnanta (Singapore) Tan Wei Han	
2020	(Denmark) Victor Svendsen	(Japan) Natsuki Nidaira	(Chinese Taipei) Chiang Chien-wei (Chinese Taipei) Ye Hong-wei	(Denmark) Julie Finne-Ipsen (Denmark) Mai Surrow	(Japan) Yujiro Nishikawa (Japan) Saori Ozaki	
2021	Cancelled (Note: This tournament, originally to be played from 21–24 January, was later cancelled due to the COVID-19 pandemic in Sweden.)					
2022	(Malaysia) Kok Jing Hong	(Thailand) Pitchamon Opatniput	(Singapore) Danny Bawa Chrisnanta (Singapore) Andy Kwek	(Thailand) Chasinee Korepap (Thailand) Jhenicha Sudjaipraparat	(Finland) Anton Kaisti (Czech Republic) Alžběta Bášová	
2023	(Denmark) Victor Svendsen	(Japan) Hina Akechi	(Indonesia) Raymond Indra (Indonesia) Daniel Edgar Marvino	(Japan) Maiko Kawazoe (Japan) Sorano Yoshikawa	(Indonesia) Jafar Hidayatullah (Indonesia) Aisyah Pranata	
2024	(Spain) Pablo Abián	(India) Devika Sihag	(Denmark) William Kryger Boe (Denmark) Christian Faust Kjær	(Sweden) Moa Sjöö (Sweden) Tilda Sjöö	(Denmark) Rasmus Espersen (Denmark) Amalie Cecilie Kudsk	
2025	(France) Arnaud Merklé	(Turkey) Neslihan Arın	(England) Chua Yue Chern (England) Kelvin Ho	(Turkey) Bengisu Erçetin (Turkey) Nazlıcan İnci	(France) Grégoire Deschamp (France) Margot Lambert	
2026	(Japan) Minoru Koga	(India) Rujula Ramu	(England) Oliver Butler (England) Samuel Jones	(Denmark) Simona Pilgaard (Denmark) Signe Schulz	(Malaysia) Loo Bing Kun (Malaysia) Noraqilah Maisarah	

== Performances by nation ==
As of the 2026 edition

Pos	Nation	MS	WS	MD	WD	XD	Total
1	Denmark	23	13	21.5	15	16	88.5
2	England		4	4	13.5	11	32.5
3	Sweden	8	7	4	3.5	7.5	30
4	China	6	10	5	6	2	29
5	South Korea	1	4	3	7	5	20
6	Indonesia	4	1	8		1	14
7	Japan	2	6		2	1	11
8	Malaysia	3		1		1	5
9	India	2	2				4
10	France	1				2	3
10	Thailand		1	1	1		3
10	United States		2		1		3
13	Germany			1		1.5	2.5
14	Singapore			1		1	2
14	Turkey		1		1		2
16	Chinese Taipei			1			1
16	Netherlands				0.5	0.5	1
16	Spain	1					1
19	Czech Republic					0.5	0.5
19	Finland					0.5	0.5
19	Ireland				0.5		0.5
19	New Zealand			0.5			0.5
19	Scotland					0.5	0.5
Total		51	51	51	51	51	255
