= Hwang Sun-ho =

South Korean badminton player

Personal information
- Born: 21 April 1975 (age 51)
- Height: 1.76 m (5 ft 9 in)
- Weight: 67 kg (148 lb)

Sport
- Country: South Korea
- Sport: Badminton
- Handedness: Right
- Event: Men's singles & doubles

Men's singles & doubles
- BWF profile
Medal record
Men's badminton
Representing South Korea
Asian Games
Bronze medal – third place	1998 Bangkok	Men's team
East Asian Games
Gold medal – first place	1997 Busan	Men's team
World Junior Championships
Bronze medal – third place	1992 Jakarta	Boys' doubles

Hwang Sun-ho (Korean: 황선호; born 21 April 1975) is a former South Korean badminton player. He played badminton since in elementary school in Jeonju with his teammates former Olympic gold medalists, Kim Dong-moon and Ha Tae-kwon. Hwang affiliated with SEMCO team since 1997, emerge as national team singles ace after Lee Kwang-jin, Kim Hak-kyun and Park Sung-woo retired. He was part of the national team that won the gold medal in 1997 East Asian Games, and a bronze medal at the 1998 Asian Games. The best individual achievements in his career was being a champion in 1999 Hungarian International tournament in the men's singles event. Hwang represented his country competed at the 2000 Summer Olympics in the men's singles event, reaching into the third round. Hwang joined the conscription in South Korea for two years, and returned to play with SEMCO team. In 2004, he started his badminton career in Japan, invited by Park Sung-woo who was a coach there. He returned to Korea in 2005, and began a career as a coach in Hwasun County. He then became a badminton coach in Gyeonggi Province, and also member of Gyeonggi Badminton Federation. Hwang graduated from Wonkwang University with Physical Education and Sports Science degree.

== Achievements ==
=== World Junior Championships ===
Boys' doubles

Year	Venue	Partner	Opponent	Score	Result
1992	Istora Senayan, Jakarta, Indonesia	(South Korea) Kim Dong-moon	(Indonesia) Sigit Budiarto (Indonesia) Namrih Suroto		Bronze

=== IBF International ===
Men's singles

Year	Tournament	Opponent	Score	Result
1999	Norwegian International	(South Korea) Shon Seung-mo	15–13, 10–15, 13–15	(silver) Runner-up
1999	Hungarian International	(Germany) Conrad Hückstädt	15–6, 15–8	(gold) Winner

Men's doubles

Year	Tournament	Partner	Opponent	Score	Result
1991	Hungarian International	(South Korea) Ha Tae-kwon	(South Korea) Kim Young-gil (South Korea) Lee Dong-soo	17–14, 12–15, 9–15	(silver) Runner-up

Mixed doubles

Year	Tournament	Partner	Opponent	Score	Result
1991	Hungarian International	(South Korea) Ra Kyung-min	(South Korea) Kim Young-gil (South Korea) Park Soo-yun	3–15, 12–15	(silver) Runner-up
