= Kim Dong-moon =

South Korean badminton player (born 1975)

Personal information
- Born: 22 September 1975 (age 51) Gokseong, South Jeolla Province, South Korea
- Height: 1.84 m (6 ft 0 in)
- Weight: 74 kg (163 lb)
- Spouse: Ra Kyung-min (m. 2005)

Sport
- Country: South Korea
- Sport: Badminton
- Handedness: Right

Men's & mixed doubles
- Highest ranking: 1 (MD); 1 (XD)
- BWF profile
Medal record
Men's badminton
Representing South Korea
Olympic Games
Gold medal – first place	1996 Atlanta	Mixed doubles
Gold medal – first place	2004 Athens	Men's doubles
Bronze medal – third place	2000 Sydney	Men's doubles
World Championships
Gold medal – first place	1999 Copenhagen	Men's doubles
Gold medal – first place	1999 Copenhagen	Mixed doubles
Gold medal – first place	2003 Birmingham	Mixed doubles
Silver medal – second place	2001 Seville	Men's doubles
Silver medal – second place	2001 Seville	Mixed doubles
Bronze medal – third place	1995 Lausanne	Men's doubles
World Cup
Silver medal – second place	1995 Jakarta	Mixed doubles
Sudirman Cup
Gold medal – first place	2003 Eindhoven	Mixed team
Silver medal – second place	1997 Glasgow	Mixed team
Bronze medal – third place	1995 Lausanne	Mixed team
Bronze medal – third place	1999 Copenhagen	Mixed team
Bronze medal – third place	2001 Seville	Mixed team
Bronze medal – third place	2005 Beijing	Mixed team
Thomas Cup
Bronze medal – third place	1996 Hong Kong	Men's team
Bronze medal – third place	2000 Kuala Lumpur	Men's team
Bronze medal – third place	2004 Jakarta	Men's team
Asian Games
Gold medal – first place	1998 Bangkok	Mixed doubles
Gold medal – first place	2002 Busan	Mixed doubles
Gold medal – first place	2002 Busan	Men's team
Bronze medal – third place	1998 Bangkok	Men's team
Asian Championships
Gold medal – first place	1998 Bangkok	Mixed doubles
Gold medal – first place	1999 Kuala Lumpur	Men's doubles
Gold medal – first place	1999 Kuala Lumpur	Mixed doubles
Gold medal – first place	2001 Manila	Mixed doubles
Gold medal – first place	2002 Bangkok	Men's doubles
Gold medal – first place	2004 Kuala Lumpur	Mixed doubles
Bronze medal – third place	1995 Beijing	Mixed doubles
Asian Cup
Gold medal – first place	1996 Seoul	Men's doubles
Silver medal – second place	1995 Qingdao	Mixed doubles
Asia Cup
Bronze medal – third place	1999 Ho Chi Minh	Men's team
World Junior Championships
Silver medal – second place	1992 Jakarta	Mixed doubles
Bronze medal – third place	1992 Jakarta	Boys' doubles

Kim Dong-moon (Korean: 김동문; Hanja: 金東文; born 22 September 1975) is a retired South Korean badminton player who won titles between the mid-1990s and the mid-2000s (decade). Kim won the gold medal in the mixed doubles event with Gil Young-ah at the 1996 Atlanta Summer Olympics and won gold medals both in men's and mixed doubles at the 1999 World Championships. Kim and Ra Kyung-min, partnered up and did not drop a single match from April to November in 2003. They won 10 straight tournaments: 9 consecutive Grand Prix events and one World Championship title. Their results in 2003 earned Kim and Ra the Eddie Choong Player of the Year award. He captured this award previously by himself in 2002. Despite their domination, the golden couple crashed in the second round against the Danish partnership of Jonas Rasmussen and Rikke Olsen at the 2004 Athens Olympics. Kim however won a gold medal in men's doubles with Ha Tae-kwon. After the 2004 Olympics, Kim retired from playing and married his former mixed doubles partner, Ra in 2005. Kim is the only South Korean player to have ever won Olympic gold in both the men's and mixed doubles events and was inducted into the BWF Hall of Fame in 2009.

== Career ==
=== 1996 Summer Olympics ===
Kim competed for Korea in badminton at the 1996 Summer Olympics in mixed doubles with partner Gil Young-ah. In the final, they rallied to upset their fellow Koreans Park Joo-bong and Ra Kyung-min 13–15, 15–4, 15–12 to win the gold medal.

Kim also competed in men's doubles with partner Yoo Yong-sung, but was surprisingly eliminated by Michael Søgaard & Henrik Svarrer of Denmark 15–11, 5–15, 18–15 in the first round of the event.

=== 2004 Summer Olympics ===
Kim competed for Korea in badminton at the 2004 Summer Olympics in men's doubles with partner Ha Tae-kwon. They had a bye in the first round and defeated Robert Mateusiak and Michał Łogosz of Poland in the second. In the quarterfinals, Kim and Ha beat Zheng Bo and Sang Yang of China 15–7, 15–11. They won the semifinal against Eng Hian and Flandy Limpele of Indonesia 15–8, 15–2 and defeated fellow Koreans Lee Dong-soo and Yoo Yong-sung 15–11, 15–4 to win the gold medal.

Kim also competed in mixed doubles with partner Ra Kyung-min. They had a bye in the first round and defeated Chris Bruil and Lotte Bruil of the Netherlands in the second. In the quarterfinals, Kim and Ra lost to Jonas Rasmussen and Rikke Olsen of Denmark 17–14, 15–8.

== Personal life ==
Kim is married to his former mixed doubles partner Ra Kyung-min, and in July 2007 they had a son.

== Achievements ==
=== Olympic Games ===
Men's doubles
Year	Venue	Partner	Opponent	Score	Result
2000	The Dome, Sydney, Australia	(South Korea) Ha Tae-kwon	(Malaysia) Choong Tan Fook (Malaysia) Lee Wan Wah	15–2, 15–8	Bronze
2004	Goudi Olympic Hall, Athens, Greece	(South Korea) Ha Tae-kwon	(South Korea) Lee Dong-soo (South Korea) Yoo Yong-sung	15–11, 15–4	Gold

Mixed doubles
Year	Venue	Partner	Opponent	Score	Result
1996	GSU Sports Arena, Atlanta, United States	(South Korea) Gil Young-ah	(South Korea) Park Joo-bong (South Korea) Ra Kyung-min	13–15, 15–4, 15–12	Gold

=== World Championships ===
Men's doubles
Year	Venue	Partner	Opponent	Score	Result
1995	Malley Sports Centre, Lausanne, Switzerland	(South Korea) Yoo Yong-sung	(Denmark) Jon Holst-Christensen (Denmark) Thomas Lund	12–15, 2–15	Bronze
1999	Brøndby Arena, Copenhagen, Denmark	(South Korea) Ha Tae-kwon	(South Korea) Lee Dong-soo (South Korea) Yoo Yong-sung	15–5, 15–5	Gold
2001	Palacio de Deportes de San Pablo, Seville, Spain	(South Korea) Ha Tae-kwon	(Indonesia) Tony Gunawan (Indonesia) Halim Haryanto	0–15, 13–15	Silver

Mixed doubles
Year	Venue	Partner	Opponent	Score	Result
1999	Brøndby Arena, Copenhagen, Denmark	(South Korea) Ra Kyung-min	(England) Simon Archer (England) Joanne Goode	15–10, 15–13	Gold
2001	Palacio de Deportes de San Pablo, Seville, Spain	(South Korea) Ra Kyung-min	(China) Zhang Jun (China) Gao Ling	10–15, 15–12, 16–17	Silver
2003	National Indoor Arena, Birmingham, United Kingdom	(South Korea) Ra Kyung-min	(China) Zhang Jun (China) Gao Ling	15–7, 15–8	Gold

=== World Cup ===
Mixed doubles
Year	Venue	Partner	Opponent	Score	Result
1995	Istora Senayan, Jakarta, Indonesia	(South Korea) Kim Shin-young	(Indonesia) Tri Kusharyanto (Indonesia) Minarti Timur	9–15, 18–13, 12–15	Silver

=== Asian Games ===
Mixed doubles
Year	Venue	Partner	Opponent	Score	Result
1998	Thammasat Gymnasium 2 Bangkok, Thailand	(South Korea) Ra Kyung-min	(South Korea) Lee Dong-soo (South Korea) Yim Kyung-jin	15–6, 15–8	Gold
2002	Gangseo Gymnasium; Busan, South Korea	(South Korea) Ra Kyung-min	(Thailand) Khunakorn Sudhisodhi (Thailand) Saralee Thungthongkam	11–4, 11–0	Gold

=== Asian Championships ===
Men's doubles
Year	Venue	Partner	Opponent	Score	Result
1999	Kuala Lumpur Badminton Stadium; Kuala Lumpur, Malaysia	(South Korea) Ha Tae-kwon	(China) Zhang Jun (China) Zhang Wei	15–6, 15–4	Gold
2002	Nimibutr Stadium; Bangkok, Thailand	(South Korea) Ha Tae-kwon	(Indonesia) Sigit Budiarto (Indonesia) Candra Wijaya	15–6, 15–8	Gold

Mixed doubles
Year	Venue	Partner	Opponent	Score	Result
1995	Olympic Sports Center Gymnasium; Beijing, China	(South Korea) Kim Shin-young	(China) Liu Jianjun (China) Ge Fei	16–18, 11–15	Bronze
1998	Nimibutr Stadium; Bangkok, Thailand	(South Korea) Ra Kyung-min	(China) Sun Jun (China) Ge Fei	15–7, 15–8	Gold
1999	Kuala Lumpur Badminton Stadium; Kuala Lumpur, Malaysia	(South Korea) Ra Kyung-min	(China) Liu Yong (China) Ge Fei	15–7, 15–13	Gold
2001	PhilSports Arena; Manila, Philippines	(South Korea) Ra Kyung-min	(Indonesia) Bambang Suprianto (Indonesia) Minarti Timur	11–15, 15–4, 15–3	Gold
2004	Kuala Lumpur Badminton Stadium; Kuala Lumpur, Malaysia	(South Korea) Ra Kyung-min	(Thailand) Sudket Prapakamol (Thailand) Saralee Thungthongkam	15–10, 17–16	Gold

=== Asian Cup ===
Men's doubles
Year	Venue	Partner	Opponent	Score	Result
1996	Olympic Gymnasium No. 2 Seoul, South Korea	(South Korea) Yoo Yong-sung	(Indonesia) Tony Gunawan (Indonesia) Rudy Wijaya	15–10, 15–8	Gold

Mixed doubles
Year	Venue	Partner	Opponent	Score	Result
1995	Xinxing Gymnasium; Qingdao, China	(South Korea) Gil Young-ah	(China) Liu Jianjun (China) Sun Man	11–15, 15–7, 10–15	Silver

=== World Junior Championships ===
Boys' doubles
Year	Venue	Partner	Opponent	Score	Result
1992	Istora Senayan; Jakarta, Indonesia	(South Korea) Hwang Sun-ho	(Indonesia) Sigit Budiarto (Indonesia) Namrih Suroto		Bronze

Mixed doubles
Year	Venue	Partner	Opponent	Score	Result
1992	Istora Senayan; Jakarta, Indonesia	(South Korea) Kim Shin-young	(Denmark) Jim Laugesen (Denmark) Rikke Olsen	11–15, 17–18	Silver

=== IBF World Grand Prix (59 titles, 9 runners-up) ===
The World Badminton Grand Prix sanctioned by International Badminton Federation (IBF) since 1983.

Men's doubles
Year	Tournament	Partner	Opponent	Score	Result
1995	Swedish Open	(South Korea) Kang Kyung-jin	(Sweden) Peter Axelsson (Sweden) Pär-Gunnar Jönsson	5–15, 9–15	(silver) Runner-up
1995	Canada Open	(South Korea) Yoo Yong-sung	(South Korea) Ha Tae-kwon (South Korea) Kang Kyung-jin	15–12, 6–15, 8–15	(silver) Runner-up
1997	U.S. Open	(South Korea) Ha Tae-kwon	(China) Liu Yong (China) Zhang Wei	15–3, 6–15, 15–12	(gold) Winner
1997	Hong Kong Open	(South Korea) Ha Tae-kwon	(Indonesia) Eng Hian (Indonesia) Hermono Yuwono	15–4, 15–12	(gold) Winner
1999	Swedish Open	(South Korea) Ha Tae-kwon	(South Korea) Lee Dong-soo (South Korea) Yoo Yong-sung	15–11, 15–5	(gold) Winner
1999	Japan Open	(South Korea) Ha Tae-kwon	(South Korea) Lee Dong-soo (South Korea) Yoo Yong-sung	15–6, 15–4	(gold) Winner
1999	China Open	(South Korea) Ha Tae-kwon	(South Korea) Lee Dong-soo (South Korea) Yoo Yong-sung	17–16, 15–8	(gold) Winner
1999	World Grand Prix Finals	(South Korea) Ha Tae-kwon	(Indonesia) Tony Gunawan (Indonesia) Candra Wijaya	7–15, 15–8, 11–15	(silver) Runner-up
2000	All England Open	(South Korea) Ha Tae-kwon	(South Korea) Lee Dong-soo (South Korea) Yoo Yong-sung	15–4, 13–15, 17–15	(gold) Winner
2000	Swiss Open	(South Korea) Ha Tae-kwon	(Denmark) Jens Eriksen (Denmark) Jesper Larsen	15–12, 15–2	(gold) Winner
2001	Korea Open	(South Korea) Ha Tae-kwon	(South Korea) Lee Dong-soo (South Korea) Yoo Yong-sung	15–9, 15–4	(gold) Winner
2002	All England Open	(South Korea) Ha Tae-kwon	(Indonesia) Eng Hian (Indonesia) Flandy Limpele	7–2, 7–2, 1–7, 7–3	(gold) Winner
2002	Korea Open	(South Korea) Ha Tae-kwon	(South Korea) Lee Dong-soo (South Korea) Yoo Yong-sung	7–0, 7–4, 7–0	(gold) Winner
2002	Chinese Taipei Open	(South Korea) Ha Tae-kwon	(Indonesia) Bambang Suprianto (Indonesia) Candra Wijaya	15–9, 13–15, 15–3	(gold) Winner
2002	Singapore Open	(South Korea) Ha Tae-kwon	(Indonesia) Eng Hian (Indonesia) Flandy Limpele	8–15, 15–11, 14–17	(silver) Runner-up
2002	Dutch Open	(South Korea) Ha Tae-kwon	(Denmark) Jens Eriksen (Denmark) Martin Lundgaard Hansen	15–8, 15–8	(gold) Winner
2002	Denmark Open	(South Korea) Ha Tae-kwon	(Malaysia) Chan Chong Ming (Malaysia) Chew Choon Eng	15–4, 15–8	(gold) Winner
2003	Korea Open	(South Korea) Ha Tae-kwon	(South Korea) Lee Dong-soo (South Korea) Yoo Yong-sung	15–11, 15–6	(gold) Winner
2003	Malaysia Open	(South Korea) Ha Tae-kwon	(China) Cai Yun (China) Fu Haifeng	17–15, 15–11	(gold) Winner
2003	Dutch Open	(South Korea) Ha Tae-kwon	(South Korea) Kim Yong-hyun (South Korea) Yim Bang-eun	15–2, 15–2	(gold) Winner
2003	Denmark Open	(South Korea) Ha Tae-kwon	(Indonesia) Halim Haryanto (Indonesia) Candra Wijaya	16–17, 15–6, 15–8	(gold) Winner
2003	Chinese Taipei Open	(South Korea) Ha Tae-kwon	(Indonesia) Eng Hian (Indonesia) Flandy Limpele	15–4, 15–1	(gold) Winner
2004	Japan Open	(South Korea) Ha Tae-kwon	(China) Cai Yun (China) Fu Haifeng	15–7, 6–15, 15–6	(gold) Winner

Mixed doubles
Year	Tournament	Partner	Opponent	Score	Result
1995	Chinese Taipei Open	(South Korea) Kim Shin-young	(Denmark) Jens Eriksen (Denmark) Rikke Olsen	10–15, 5–15	(silver) Runner-up
1995	Swedish Open	(South Korea) Gil Young-ah	(China) Chen Xingdong (China) Wang Xiaoyuan	13–18, 15–5, 9–15	(silver) Runner-up
1995	Malaysia Open	(South Korea) Gil Young-ah	(China) Tao Xiaoqiang (China) Wang Xiaoyuan	15–7, 15–9	(gold) Winner
1995	Singapore Open	(South Korea) Gil Young-ah	(Indonesia) Tri Kusharjanto (Indonesia) Minarti Timur	12–15, 15–9, 10–15	(silver) Runner-up
1995	U.S. Open	(South Korea) Gil Young-ah	(Indonesia) Tri Kusharjanto (Indonesia) Minarti Timur	15–5, 10–15, 15–13	(gold) Winner
1995	Canada Open	(South Korea) Gil Young-ah	(South Korea) Kang Kyung-jin (South Korea) Kim Mee-hyang	15–7, 15–8	(gold) Winner
1996	Japan Open	(South Korea) Gil Young-ah	(South Korea) Park Joo-bong (South Korea) Ra Kyung-min	7–15, 1–15	(silver) Runner-up
1996	U.S. Open	(South Korea) Chung So-young	(England) Chris Hunt (Denmark) Helene Kirkegaard	15–5, 15–7	(gold) Winner
1997	Singapore Open	(South Korea) Park So-yun	(Indonesia) Bambang Suprianto (Indonesia) Rosalina Riseu	13–15, 9–15	(silver) Runner-up
1997	U.S. Open	(South Korea) Ra Kyung-min	(Indonesia) Bambang Suprianto (Indonesia) Rosalina Riseu	15–1, 15–3	(gold) Winner
1997	Hong Kong Open	(South Korea) Ra Kyung-min	(South Korea) Ha Tae-kwon (South Korea) Chung Jae-hee	15–12, 15–3	(gold) Winner
1997	China Open	(South Korea) Ra Kyung-min	(China) Liu Yong (China) Ge Fei	15–10, 15–6	(gold) Winner
1998	Japan Open	(South Korea) Ra Kyung-min	(Denmark) Jens Eriksen (Denmark) Marlene Thomsen	15–12, 15–9	(gold) Winner
1998	Swedish Open	(South Korea) Ra Kyung-min	(China) Chen Gang (China) Tang Yongshu	15–3, 15–3	(gold) Winner
1998	All England Open	(South Korea) Ra Kyung-min	(Denmark) Michael Søgaard (Denmark) Rikke Olsen	15–2, 11–15, 15–5	(gold) Winner
1998	World Grand Prix Finals	(South Korea) Ra Kyung-min	(England) Simon Archer (England) Joanne Goode	15–6, 15–9	(gold) Winner
1999	Korea Open	(South Korea) Ra Kyung-min	(China) Liu Yong (China) Ge Fei	15–6, 15–8	(gold) Winner
1999	Swedish Open	(South Korea) Ra Kyung-min	(South Korea) Ha Tae-kwon (South Korea) Chung Jae-hee	15–1, 15–4	(gold) Winner
1999	Singapore Open	(South Korea) Ra Kyung-min	(Denmark) Michael Søgaard (Denmark) Rikke Olsen	15–4, 15–8	(gold) Winner
1999	World Grand Prix Finals	(South Korea) Ra Kyung-min	(Indonesia) Tri Kusharjanto (Indonesia) Minarti Timur	15–5, 15–7	(gold) Winner
2000	Korea Open	(South Korea) Ra Kyung-min	(Indonesia) Tri Kusharjanto (Indonesia) Minarti Timur	15–13, 15–3	(gold) Winner
2000	All England Open	(South Korea) Ra Kyung-min	(China) Liu Yong (China) Ge Fei	15–10, 15–2	(gold) Winner
2000	Swiss Open	(South Korea) Ra Kyung-min	(China) Zhang Jun (China) Gao Ling	15–8, 15–9	(gold) Winner
2000	Malaysia Open	(South Korea) Ra Kyung-min	(Indonesia) Tri Kusharjanto (Indonesia) Minarti Timur	15–7, 15–8	(gold) Winner
2001	Korea Open	(South Korea) Ra Kyung-min	(China) Zhang Jun (China) Gao Ling	15–8, 15–11	(gold) Winner
2001	Hong Kong Open	(South Korea) Ra Kyung-min	(Thailand) Khunakorn Sudhisodhi (Thailand) Saralee Thungthongkam	3–7, 7–0, 7–2, 7–2	(gold) Winner
2002	All England Open	(South Korea) Ra Kyung-min	(Denmark) Jens Eriksen (Denmark) Mette Schjoldager	7–3, 7–3, 7–0	(gold) Winner
2002	Swiss Open	(South Korea) Ra Kyung-min	(Denmark) Jonas Rasmussen (Denmark) Jane F. Bramsen	7–3, 7–5, 1–7, 7–4	(gold) Winner
2002	Korea Open	(South Korea) Ra Kyung-min	(Denmark) Michael Søgaard (Denmark) Rikke Olsen	7–1, 7–3, 7–5	(gold) Winner
2002	Japan Open	(South Korea) Ra Kyung-min	(Indonesia) Nova Widianto (Indonesia) Vita Marissa	7–3, 7–2, 7–2	(gold) Winner
2002	Singapore Open	(South Korea) Ra Kyung-min	(England) Nathan Robertson (England) Gail Emms	11–2, 13–10	(gold) Winner
2002	Dutch Open	(South Korea) Lee Kyung-won	(South Korea) Ha Tae-kwon (South Korea) Hwang Yu-mi	11–9, 11–2	(gold) Winner
2002	Denmark Open	(South Korea) Hwang Yu-mi	(Indonesia) Nova Widianto (Indonesia) Vita Marissa	11–6, 4–11, 11–7	(gold) Winner
2003	Korea Open	(South Korea) Ra Kyung-min	(South Korea) Kim Yong-hyun (South Korea) Lee Hyo-jung	11–5, 11–4	(gold) Winner
2003	Singapore Open	(South Korea) Ra Kyung-min	(China) Zheng Bo (China) Zhang Jiewen	15–5, 15–9	(gold) Winner
2003	Indonesia Open	(South Korea) Ra Kyung-min	(China) Zhang Jun (China) Gao Ling	10–15, 15–11, 15–6	(gold) Winner
2003	Malaysia Open	(South Korea) Ra Kyung-min	(England) Nathan Robertson (England) Gail Emms	15–6, 15–5	(gold) Winner
2003	Dutch Open	(South Korea) Ra Kyung-min	(South Korea) Kim Yong-hyun (South Korea) Lee Hyo-jung	15–4, 15–2	(gold) Winner
2003	Denmark Open	(South Korea) Ra Kyung-min	(South Korea) Kim Yong-hyun (South Korea) Lee Hyo-jung	17–16, 15–10	(gold) Winner
2003	German Open	(South Korea) Ra Kyung-min	(China) Zhang Jun (China) Gao Ling	15–12, 11–15, 15–8	(gold) Winner
2003	Hong Kong Open	(South Korea) Ra Kyung-min	(China) Zhang Jun (China) Gao Ling	15–7, 15–10	(gold) Winner
2003	Chinese Taipei Open	(South Korea) Ra Kyung-min	(Indonesia) Nova Widianto (Indonesia) Vita Marissa	15–7, 15–5	(gold) Winner
2004	Swiss Open	(South Korea) Ra Kyung-min	(China) Zhang Jun (China) Gao Ling	15–2, 15–8	(gold) Winner
2004	All England Open	(South Korea) Ra Kyung-min	(South Korea) Kim Yong-hyun (South Korea) Lee Hyo-jung	15–8, 17–15	(gold) Winner
2004	Korea Open	(South Korea) Ra Kyung-min	(South Korea) Kim Yong-hyun (South Korea) Lee Hyo-jung	15–5, 15–11	(gold) Winner

=== IBF International (2 titles) ===
Men's doubles
Year	Tournament	Partner	Opponent	Score	Result
1999	Australia International	(South Korea) Yoo Yong-sung	(South Korea) Ha Tae-kwon (South Korea) Lee Dong-soo	14–17, 15–9, 15–12	(gold) Winner
2002	Malaysia Satellite	(South Korea) Ha Tae-kwon	(Malaysia) Jeremy Gan (Malaysia) Gan Teik Chai	15–4, 15–0	(gold) Winner
