= Park Soo-yun =

South Korean badminton player

Personal information
- Born: 27 November 1974 (age 51)
- Height: 176 cm (5 ft 9 in)

Sport
- Country: South Korea
- Sport: Badminton
- Handedness: Right
- Event: Women and mixed doubles
Medal record
Women's badminton
Representing South Korea
Uber Cup
Silver medal – second place	1992 Kuala Lumpur	Women's team
Bronze medal – third place	1996 Hong Kong	Women's team
Asian Championships
Bronze medal – third place	1996 Surabaya	Women's doubles

Park Soo-yun (Korean:박•수연, born 27 November 1974) is a South Korean badminton player. She was part of the Korean Uber Cup runner-up squad in 1992. Park won the Chinese Taipei Open with her partner, Yim Kyung-jin back in 1997. She competed in women's doubles at the 1996 Summer Olympics in Atlanta.

== Achievements ==
=== Asian Championships ===
Women's doubles
Year	Venue	Partner	Opponent	Score	Result
1996	Pancasila Hall; Surabaya, Indonesia	(South Korea) Chung Jae-hee	(Indonesia) Finarsih (Indonesia) Eliza Nathanael	10–15, 3–15	Bronze

=== IBF World Grand Prix ===
The World Badminton Grand Prix sanctioned by International Badminton Federation (IBF) from 1983 to 2006.

Women's doubles
Year	Tournament	Partner	Opponent	Score	Result
1992	Malaysia Open	(South Korea) Gil Young-ah	(Sweden) Lim Xiaoqing (Sweden) Christine Magnusson	7–15, 9–15	(silver) Runner-up
1996	China Open	(South Korea) Kim Mee-hyang	(China) Qin Yiyuan (China) Tang Yongshu	2–15, 12–15	(silver) Runner-up
1997	Chinese Taipei Open	(South Korea) Yim Kyung-jin	(Japan) Haruko Matsuda (Japan) Yoshiko Iwata	15–12, 15–8	(gold) Winner

Mixed doubles
Year	Tournament	Partner	Opponent	Score	Result
1997	Vietnam Open	(South Korea) Lee Dong-soo	(Indonesia) Bambang Suprianto (Indonesia) Rosalina Riseu	5–15, 10–15	(silver) Runner-up
1997	Chinese Taipei Open	(South Korea) Lee Dong-soo	(Indonesia) Sandiarto (Indonesia) Finarsih	11–15, 8–15	(silver) Runner-up

=== IBF International ===
Women's singles
Year	Tournament	Opponent	Score	Result
1991	Hungarian International	(South Korea) Ra Kyung-min	11–0, 11–4	(gold) Winner

Women's doubles
Year	Tournament	Partner	Opponent	Score	Result
1991	Hungarian International	(South Korea) Kim Shin-young	(South Korea) Choi Ma-ree (South Korea) Ra Kyung-min	15–9, 15–6	(gold) Winner

Mixed doubles
Year	Tournament	Partner	Opponent	Score	Result
1991	Hungarian International	(South Korea) Kim Young-gil	(South Korea) Hwang Sun-ho (South Korea) Ra Kyung-min	15–3, 15–12	(gold) Winner
