= 1997 IBF World Championships – Women's singles =

Badminton championships

Women's singles at the 1997 IBF World Championships
- Venue: Scotstoun Centre
- Location: Glasgow, Scotland
- Dates: May 24, 1997 – June 1, 1997

Medalists
| gold medal | Ye Zhaoying | China |
| silver medal | Gong Zhichao | China |
| bronze medal | Han Jingna | China |
| bronze medal | Wang Chen | China |

The 10th IBF World Championships (Badminton) were held in Glasgow, Scotland, between 24 May and 1 June 1997. Following the results of the women's singles.

== Seeds ==
1. (China) Ye Zhaoying
2. (China) Gong Zhichao
3. (Indonesia) Mia Audina
4. (Denmark) Camilla Martin
5. (Indonesia) Susi Susanti
6. (China) Wang Chen
7. (China) Zhang Ning
8. (South Korea) Ra Kyung-min
9. (South Korea) Kim Ji-hyun
10. (China) Han Jingna
11. (South Korea) Lee Joo Hyun
12. (China) Zeng Yaqiong
13. (China) Yao Yan
14. (Chinese Taipei) Huang Chia-chi
15. (China) Dai Yun
16. (Indonesia) Cindana Hartono Kusuma

== Main stage ==
=== Section 1 ===
First round
(China) Ye Zhaoying | 11 | 11
(France) Sandra Dimbour | 4 | 2
(Australia) Lisa Campbell | 12 | 5 | 12
(Wales) Kelly Morgan | 9 | 11 | 9
(Indonesia) Cindana Hartono Kusuma | 8 | 11 | 11
(Chinese Taipei) Jeng Shwu-Jen | 11 | 5 | 2
(Sweden) Marina Andrievskaya | 11 | 12
(Netherlands) Carolien Glebbeek | 3 | 9
(China) Dai Yun | 11 | 11
(Scotland) Gillian Martin | 4 | 3
(Belarus) Vlada Tcherniavskaia | 11 | 11
(Canada) Charmaine Reid | 4 | 2
(South Korea) Ra Kyung-min | 12 | 11
(England) Tracey Hallam | 11 | 8
(Denmark) Anne Sondergaard | 12 | 11
(Hong Kong) Ling Wan Ting | 11 | 8

Second round
(China) Ye Zhaoying | 11 | 11
(Australia) Lisa Campbell | 1 | 1
(Indonesia) Cindana Hartono Kusuma | 11 | 11 | 11
(Sweden) Marina Andrievskaya | 7 | 12 | 3
(China) Dai Yun | 11 | 11
(Belarus) Vlada Tcherniavskaia | 0 | 0
(South Korea) Ra Kyung-min | 11 | 11
(Denmark) Anne Sondergaard | 6 | 4

Third round
(China) Ye Zhaoying | 11 | 11
(Indonesia) Cindana Hartono Kusuma | 4 | 1
(China) Dai Yun | 11 | 11
(South Korea) Ra Kyung-min | 6 | 5

Quarterfinals
(China) Ye Zhaoying | 11 | 11
(China) Dai Yun | 7 | 6

=== Section 2 ===
First round
(China) Wang Chen | 11 | 11
(Finland) Anu Weckström | 3 | 2
(Thailand) Pornsawan Plungwech | 11 | 11
(England) Emma Constable | 2 | 0
(South Korea) Lee Joo Hyun | 11 | 11
(Netherlands) Brenda Beenhakker | 4 | 4
(Hong Kong) Louisa Koon Wai Chee | 11 | 11
(Sweden) Kristin Evernas | 8 | 5
(Indonesia) Mia Audina | 11 | 11
2 | 3
(Poland) Katarzyna Krasowska | 3 | 11 | 11
(Malaysia) Law Pei Pei | 11 | 7 | 1
(China) Yao Yan | 11 | 11
(Germany) Katja Michalowsky | 1 | 3
(Malaysia) Ishwarii Boopathy | 11 | 3 | 11
(Poland) Kinga Rudolf | 1 | 11 | 2

Second round
(China) Wang Chen | 11 | 11
(Thailand) Pornsawan Plungwech | 1 | 9
(South Korea) Lee Joo Hyun | 11 | 11
(Hong Kong) Louisa Koon Wai Chee | 0 | 6
(Indonesia) Mia Audina | 11 | 11
(Poland) Katarzyna Krasowska | 8 | 1
(China) Yao Yan | 11 | 11
(Malaysia) Ishwarii Boopathy | 1 | 1

Third round
(China) Wang Chen | 12 | 11
(South Korea) Lee Joo Hyun | 10 | 1
(Indonesia) Mia Audina | 7 | 11 | 11
(China) Yao Yan | 11 | 1 | 3

Quarterfinals
(China) Wang Chen | 11 | 11
(Indonesia) Mia Audina | 6 | 4

=== Section 3 ===
First round
(China) Gong Zhichao | 11 | 11
(England) Julia Mann | 3 | 0
(Japan) Miho Tanaka | 11 | 11
(Netherlands) Monique Hoogland | 9 | 4
(South Korea) Kim Ji-hyun | 11 | 11
(France) Christelle Szynal | 0 | 4
(Thailand) Duangsiri Thitikan | 11 | 11
(Canada) Denyse Julien | 8 | 6
(Indonesia) Susi Susanti | 11 | 11
(Hong Kong) Ng Ching | 4 | 1
(Chinese Taipei) Chan Ya-Lin | 10 | 11 | 11
(Ukraine) Elena Nozdran | 12 | 1 | 6
(China) Zeng Yaqiong | 11 | 11
(Sweden) Margit Borg | 6 | 2
(Denmark) Mette Sorensen | 11 | 11
(Slovenia) Maja Pohar | 1 | 7

Second round
(China) Gong Zhichao | 11 | 11
(Japan) Miho Tanaka | 5 | 0
(South Korea) Kim Ji-hyun | 11 | 11
(Thailand) Duangsiri Thitikan | 2 | 0
(Indonesia) Susi Susanti | 11 | 11
(Chinese Taipei) Chan Ya-Lin | 1 | 1
(China) Zeng Yaqiong | 11 | 11 | 11
(Denmark) Mette Sorensen | 12 | 8 | 3

Third round
(China) Gong Zhichao | 11 | 11
(South Korea) Kim Ji-hyun | 4 | 6
(Indonesia) Susi Susanti | 3 | 12 | 11
(China) Zeng Yaqiong | 11 | 9 | 3

Quarterfinals
(China) Gong Zhichao | 11 | 11
(Indonesia) Susi Susanti | 5 | 2

=== Section 4 ===
First round
(China) Han Jingna | 11 | 11
(India) Madhumita Bisht | 5 | 6
(Scotland) Anne Gibson | 11 | 10 | 11
(Sweden) Karolina Ericsson | 4 | 12 | 3
(Denmark) Camilla Martin | 11 | 11
(Spain) Dolores Marco | 1 | 0
(South Korea) Park Jin-hyun | 11 | 11
(Japan) Hiroko Nagamine | 6 | 4
(China) Zhang Ning | 11 | 11
(Malaysia) Lee Yin Yin | 0 | 4
(Netherlands) Judith Meulendijks | 12 | 11
(Canada) Kara Solmundson | 10 | 3
(Chinese Taipei) Huang Chia-Chi | 12 | 11
(England) Tanya Woodward | 9 | 3
(Indonesia) Meiluawati | 11 | 11
(Russia) Ella Karachkova | 6 | 0

Second round
(China) Han Jingna | 11 | 11
(Scotland) Anne Gibson | 0 | 6
(Denmark) Camilla Martin | 11 | 11
(South Korea) Park Jin-hyun | 1 | 2
(China) Zhang Ning | 11 | 11
(Netherlands) Judith Meulendijks | 2 | 8
(Chinese Taipei) Huang Chia-Chi | 11 | 11
(Indonesia) Meiluawati | 4 | 7

Third round
(China) Han Jingna | 3 | 11 | 11
(Denmark) Camilla Martin | 11 | 7 | 7
(China) Zhang Ning | 11 | 11
(Chinese Taipei) Huang Chia-Chi | 5 | 1

Quarterfinals
(China) Han Jingna | 11 | 11
(China) Zhang Ning | 8 | 7

== Final stage ==
Quarterfinals
(China) Ye Zhaoying | 11 | 11
(China) Dai Yun | 7 | 6
(China) Wang Chen | 11 | 11
(Indonesia) Mia Audina | 6 | 4
(China) Gong Zhichao | 11 | 11
(Indonesia) Susi Susanti | 5 | 2
(China) Han Jingna | 11 | 11
(China) Zhang Ning | 8 | 7

Semifinals
(China) Ye Zhaoying | 11 | 5 | 11
(China) Wang Chen | 5 | 11 | 4
(China) Gong Zhichao | 12 | 11
(China) Han Jingna | 11 | 9

Finals
(China) Ye Zhaoying | 12 | 11
(China) Gong Zhichao | 11 | 8
