= 1999 All England Open Badminton Championships =

1999 All England Championships
Tournament details
- Dates: 9 March 1999– 14 March 1999
- Edition: 89th
- Location: Birmingham

The 1999 Yonex All England Open was the 89th edition of the All England Open Badminton Championships. It was held from 9 to 14 March 1999, in Birmingham, England.

It was a four-star tournament and the prize money was US$125,000.

== Venue ==
- National Indoor Arena

== Final results ==
Category	Winners	Runners-up	Score
Men's singles	(Denmark) Peter Gade	(Indonesia) Taufik Hidayat	15–11, 7–15, 15–10
Women's singles	(China) Ye Zhaoying	(China) Dai Yun	9–11, 11–5, 11–1
Men's doubles	(Indonesia) Tony Gunawan & Candra Wijaya	(South Korea) Lee Dong-soo & Yoo Yong-sung	15–7, 15–5
Women's doubles	(South Korea) Chung Jae-hee & Ra Kyung-min	(China) Huang Sui & Lu Ying	15–6, 15–8
Mixed doubles	(England) Simon Archer & Joanne Goode	(South Korea) Ha Tae-kwon & Chung Jae-hee	15–2, 15–13

== Men's singles ==
=== Section 1 ===
Round of 32
(Denmark) Peter Gade	15	15
(Belgium) Ruud Kuijten	5	6
(India) Srikant Bakshi	15	15
(Denmark) Joachim Fischer Nielsen	9	13
(Indonesia) Yohan Hadikusumo Wiratama	6	15	15
(Denmark) Peter Janum	15	10	8
(Japan) Fumihiko Machida	15	7	15
(France) Nabil Lasmari	5	15	8
(Indonesia) Budi Santoso	15	15
(China) Chen Wei	8	6
(Malaysia) Wong Choong Hann	15	15
(Denmark) Anders Boesen	2	7
(Indonesia) Indra Wijaya	15	9	15
(Denmark) Kenneth Jonassen	13	15	13
(Netherlands) Dicky Palyama	15	13	15
(Scotland) Bruce Flockhart	7	15	7

Round of 16
(Denmark) Gade	15	15
(India) Bakshi	6	3
(Indonesia) Hadikusuma	15	15
(China) Machida	6	2
(Indonesia) Santoso	15	15
(Malaysia) Wong	6	3
(Indonesia) Wijaya	15	15
(Netherlands) Palyama	2	11

Quarter-finals
(Denmark) Gade	17	15
(Indonesia) Hadikusuma	15	8
(Indonesia) Santoso	15	11	15
(Indonesia) Wijaya	12	15	6

Semi-finals
(Denmark) Gade	15	15
(Indonesia) Santoso	11	5

=== Section 2 ===
Round of 32
(Indonesia) Taufik Hidayat	15	17
(South Korea) Park Tae-sang	5	16
(England) Peter Knowles	12	15	ret
(Malaysia) Rashid Sidek	15	13
(Chinese Taipei) Fung Permadi	15	15
(Indonesia) Rony Agustinus	10	7
(England) Colin Haughton	15	15
(Denmark) Martin Delfs	4	6
(Denmark) Poul-Erik Høyer Larsen	15	15
(China) Xia Xuanze	11	11
(Malaysia) Muhammad Roslin Hashim	15	15
(Denmark) Kasper Ødum	5	1
(Denmark) Thomas Stuer-Lauridsen	15	10	15
(China) Chen Gang	4	15	12
(Indonesia) Hendrawan	15	15
(Denmark) Kasper Fangel	10	8

Round of 16
(Indonesia) Hidayat	15	15
(England) Knowles	3	10
(Chinese Taipei) Permadi	15	15
(England) Haughton	12	2
(Denmark) Høyer Larsen	15	15
(Malaysia) Roslin	9	5
(Denmark) S-Lauridsen	15	15
(Indonesia) Hendrawan	12	8

Quarter-finals
(Indonesia) Hidayat	15	17
(Chinese Taipei) Permadi	5	16
(Denmark) Høyer Larsen	15	15
(Denmark) S-Lauridsen	12	12

Semi-finals
(Indonesia) Hidayat	15	15
(Denmark) Høyer Larsen	13	7

== Women's singles ==
=== Section 1 ===
Round of 32
(China) Ye Zhaoying	11	11
(Canada) Kara Solmundson	2	5
(South Korea) Lee Kyung-won	11	5	11
(Thailand) Sujitra Ekmongkolpaisarn	2	11	1
(China) Gong Zhichao	11	11
(Indonesia) Lidya Djaelawijaya	5	4
(Japan) Kanako Yonekura	11	11
(England) Jill Pittard	0	3
(Denmark) Camilla Martin	11	11
(Scotland) Sonya McGinn	1	0
(Japan) Miho Tanaka	13	11
(Indonesia) Meiluawati	11	7
(China) Gong Ruina	11	11
(England) Justine Willmott	2	4
(Netherlands) Judith Meulendijks	11	11
(Slovenia) Maja Pohar	4	1

Round of 16
(China) Zhaoying	11	11
(South Korea) Kyung-won	5	5
(China) Zhichao	11	11
(Japan) Yonekura	2	5
(Denmark) Martin	11	11
(Japan) Tanaka	1	6
(China) Ruina	11	11
(Netherlands) Meulendijks	7	7

Quarter-finals
(China) Zhaoying	11	11
(China) Zhichao	6	8
(Denmark) Martin	11	4	11
(China) Ruina	3	11	5

Semi-finals
(China) Zhaoying	11	11
(Denmark) Martin	1	3

=== Section 2 ===
Round of 32
(China) Dai Yun	11	11
(Germany) Katja Michalowsky	1	3
(Indonesia) Ellen Angelina	11	11
(Wales) Kelly Morgan	8	8
(Chinese Taipei) Huang Chia-chi	11	11
(Poland) Joanna Szleszyńska	1	0
(Japan) Yasuko Mizui	11	11
(Denmark) Christina Sørensen	2	4
(China) Zhou Mi	11	13
(Denmark) Tine Rasmussen	2	10
(Indonesia) Cindana Hartono Kusuma	11	11
(Scotland) Sandra Watt	2	2
(Indonesia) Mia Audina	11	11
(Canada) Charmaine Reid	2	1
(Denmark) Mette Sørensen	11	11
(France) Sandra Dimbour	4	8

Round of 16
(China) Dai Yun	11	11
(Indonesia) Angelina	3	1
(Chinese Taipei) Chia-Chi	11	11
(Japan) Mizui	5	1
(China) Zhou Mi	6	11	13
(Indonesia) Kusuma	11	4	10
(Indonesia) Audina	11	11
(Denmark) Sørensen	5	2

Quarter-finals
(China) Dai Yun	11	11
(Chinese Taipei) Chia-Chi	5	4
(China) Zhou Mi	7	11	11
(Indonesia) Audina	11	4	7

Semi-finals
(China) Dai Yun	8	13	11
(China) Zhou Mi	11	10	5
