= 2000 All England Open Badminton Championships =

2000 All England Championships
Tournament details
- Dates: 7 March 2000– 12 March 2000
- Edition: 90th
- Location: Birmingham

The 2000 Yonex All England Open was the 90th edition of the All England Open Badminton Championships. It was held from 7 to 12 March 2000, in Birmingham, England.

It was a four star tournament and the prize money was US$125,000.

== Venue ==
- National Indoor Arena

== Final results ==
Category	Winners	Runners-up	Score
Men's singles	(China) Xia Xuanze	(Indonesia) Taufik Hidayat	15–6, 15–13
Women's singles	(China) Gong Zhichao	(China) Dai Yun	11–5, 8–11, 11–5
Men's doubles	(South Korea) Kim Dong-moon & Ha Tae-kwon	(South Korea) Lee Dong-soo & Yoo Yong-sung	15–4, 13–15, 17–15
Women's doubles	(China) Ge Fei & Gu Jun	(South Korea) Chung Jae-hee & Ra Kyung-min	15–5, 15–3
Mixed doubles	(South Korea) Kim Dong-moon & Ra Kyung-min	(China) Liu Yong & Ge Fei	15–10, 15–2

== Men's singles ==
=== Section 1 ===
Round of 32
(China) Xia XZ	15	15
(Indonesia) G Rimarcdi	2	11
(Malaysia) Wong CH	15	15
(South Korea) Shon S-m	6	12
(Indonesia) Hendrawan	12	15	15
(England) D Hall	15	4	4
(Malaysia) S Ismail	15	15
(India) N Kanetkar	6	5
(China) Ji XP	15	7	15
(Austria) J Koch	1	15	4
(Malaysia) Yong HK	15	15
(France) B Gallet	9	5
(Denmark) P Gade	13	15	15
(Thailand) B Ponsana	15	12	4
(Indonesia) B Santoso	13	15	15
(India) S Jain	15	11	7

Round of 16
(China) Xia XZ	15	15
(Malaysia) Wong CH	5	5
(Indonesia) Hendrawan	15	15
(Malaysia) S Ismail	2	6
(China) Ji XP	17	15
(Malaysia) Yong HK	16	1
(Denmark) P Gade	15	15
(Indonesia) B Santoso	3	9

Quarter-finals
(China) Xia XZ	8	15	15
(Indonesia) Hendrawan	15	11	10
(China) Ji XP	15	15	15
(Denmark) P Gade	17	2	5

Semi-finals
(China) Xia XZ	15	17
(China) Ji XP	9	15

=== Section 2 ===
Round of 32
(Indonesia) T Hidayat	15	15
(China) Chen G	5	11
(Denmark) K Jonassen	15	15
(Japan) K Shimogami	7	2
(China) Chen H	15	15
(Germany) C Huckstaedt	11	1
(Indonesia) R Agustinus	13	15	15
(Malaysia) R Sidek	15	12	8
(Chinese Taipei) F Permadi	15	15
(Wales) R Vaughan	6	5
(Malaysia) Ong EH	15	15
(Indonesia) Y Hadikusuma	5	1
(China) Dong J	15	10	15
(South Korea) Ahn J-c	4	15	12
(South Korea) Hwang S-h	15	15
(Australia) A Yang	7	3

Round of 16
(Indonesia) T Hidayat	15	15
(Denmark) K Jonassen	5	11
(China) Chen H	15	15
(Indonesia) R Agustinus	12	10
(Chinese Taipei) F Permadi	17	15
(Malaysia) Ong EH	14	4
(China) Dong J	15	15
(South Korea) Hwang S-h	10	11

Quarter-finals
(Indonesia) T Hidayat	15	15
(China) Chen H	11	10
(Chinese Taipei) F Permadi	15	15
(China) Dong J	7	8

Semi-finals
(Indonesia) T Hidayat	17	15
(Chinese Taipei) F Permadi	15	12

== Women's singles ==
=== Section 1 ===
Round of 32
(China) Gong ZC	11	11
(Netherlands) B Beenhakker	4	4
(India) A Popat	9	13	11
(Sweden) K Ericsson	11	10	8
(China) Zhang N	13	11
(Indonesia) L Djaelawidjaja	10	3
(Denmark) M Pedersen	11	13
(South Korea) Kim J-h	7	10
(Indonesia) M Audina	11	13
(Taiwan) Chien Y-c	7	10
(China) Ye ZY	11	11
(Russia) M Yakusheva	0	1
(Denmark) M Sorensen	11	11
(Taiwan) Chan Y-l	7	4
(Japan) M Tanaka	11	11
(England) J Mann	4	5

Round of 16
(China) Gong ZC	11	11
(India) A Popat	7	1
(China) Zhang N	11	11
(Denmark) M Pedersen	4	6
(Indonesia) M Audina	11	11
(China) Ye ZY	9	9
(Denmark) M Sørensen	11	11
(Japan) M Tanaka	4	4

Quarter-finals
(China) Gong ZC	11	11
(China) Zhang N	3	7
(Indonesia) M Audina	11	11
(Denmark) M Sørensen	3	7

Semi-finals
(China) Gong ZC	11	11
(Indonesia) M Audina	6	4

=== Section 2 ===
Round of 32
(China) Dai Y	11	11
(Denmark) T Rasmussen	8	0
(Sweden) M Andrievskaya	9	11	11
(Australia) K Lucas	11	1	2
(Japan) Y Mizui	6	11	11
(Russia) E Karachkova	11	3	3
(China) Zeng YQ	11	11
(Indonesia) E Angelina	7	7
(Denmark) C Martin	11	11
(Czech Republic) M Koudelkova	0	3
(South Korea) Lee K-w	11	11
(Ukraine) E Nozdran	3	1
(China) Gong RN	11	11
(Thailand) S Ekmongkolpaisarn	6	4
(China) Han JN	11	11
(Germany) H Schoenharting	5	1

Round of 16
(China) Dai Y	8	11	11
(Sweden) M Andrievskaya	11	7	1
(Japan) Y Mizui	11	11
(China) Zeng YQ	7	7
(Denmark) C Martin	11	11
(South Korea) Lee K-w	3	1
(China) Gong RN	11	11
(China) Han JN	10	6

Quarter-finals
(China) Dai Y	11	11
(Japan) Y Mizui	1	2
(Denmark) C Martin	10	11	11
(China) Gong RN	13	8	9

Semi-finals
(China) Dai Y	11	11
(Denmark) C Martin	6	8
