= 1999 IBF World Championships – Women's singles =

Badminton championships

Women's singles at the 1999 IBF World Championships
- Venue: Brøndby Arena
- Location: Copenhagen, Denmark
- Dates: May 10, 1999 – May 23, 1999

Medalists
gold medal	Camilla Martin	Denmark
silver medal	Dai Yun	China
bronze medal	Gong Ruina	China
bronze medal	Mette Sørensen	Denmark

The 1999 IBF World Championships (World Badminton Championships) were held in Copenhagen, Denmark, between 10 May and 23 May 1999. Following the results of the women's singles.

== Main stage ==
=== Section 1 ===
First round
(Denmark) Camilla Martin	9	11	11
(Nigeria) Olamide Toyin Adebayo	11	7	9
(Belarus) Vlada Tcherniavskaia	11	8	11
(Bulgaria) Victoria Hristova	9	11	1
(South Korea) Kim Ji-hyun	11	11
(Hong Kong) Ling Wan Ting	5	3
(Germany) Katja Michalowsky	11	11
(Czech Republic) Markéta Koudelková	0	4
(China) Zhang Ning	11	11
(Iceland) Brynja Petursdottir	2	0
(Sweden) Marina Andrievskaya	11	11
(Slovenia) Darja Kranjc	2	2
(Japan) Miho Tanaka	11	11
(England) Julia Mann	4	5
(Bulgaria) Neli Boteva	7	11	11
(India) P. V. V. Lakshmi	11	7	7

Second round
(Denmark) Camilla Martin	11	11
(Belarus) Vlada Tcherniavskaia	0	0
(South Korea) Kim Ji-hyun	11	11
(Germany) Katja Michalowsky	7	2
(China) Zhang Ning	11	11
(Sweden) Marina Andrievskaya	4	2
(Japan) Miho Tanaka	11	11
(Bulgaria) Neli Boteva	5	1

Third round
(Denmark) Camilla Martin	11	11
(South Korea) Kim Ji-hyun	8	1
(China) Zhang Ning	11	11
(Japan) Miho Tanaka	3	5

Quarterfinals
(Denmark) Camilla Martin	11	11
(China) Zhang Ning	9	7

=== Section 2 ===
First round
(China) Gong Ruina	11	11
(Hong Kong) Chan Mei Mei	1	4
(Chinese Taipei) Huang Chia-Chi	5	11	11
(Germany) Heike Schönharting	11	9	7
(Denmark) Mette Pedersen	13	11
(Malaysia) Woon Sze Mei	11	8
(Sweden) Margit Borg	11	11
(Switzerland) Judith Baumeyer	0	3
(Indonesia) Cindana Hartono	11	11
(Thailand) Sujitra Ekmongkolpaisarn	5	5
(Netherlands) Judith Meulendijks	11	11
(England) Rebecca Pantaney	3	0
(China) Gong Zhichao	11	11
(Canada) Kara Solmundson	2	3
(South Korea) Si Jin Sun	11	11
(Peru) Ximena Bellido	3	1

Second round
(China) Gong Ruina	11	11
(Chinese Taipei) Huang Chia-Chi	5	5
(Denmark) Mette Pedersen	11	11
(Sweden) Margit Borg	5	5
(Indonesia) Cindana Hartono	7	11	11
(Netherlands) Judith Meulendijks	11	3	6
(China) Gong Zhichao	11	11
(South Korea) Si Jin Sun	1	2

Third round
(China) Gong Ruina	11	11
(Denmark) Mette Pedersen	3	5
(Indonesia) Cindana Hartono	11	4	11
(China) Gong Zhichao	9	11	6

Quarterfinals
(China) Gong Ruina	11	11
(Indonesia) Cindana Hartono	3	2

=== Section 3 ===
First round
(China) Dai Yun	11	11
(Malaysia) Ng Mee Fen	1	4
(Hong Kong) Louisa Koon Wai Chee	11	11
(Canada) Charmaine Reid	4	3
(Indonesia) Lidya Djaelawijaya	11	11
(Sweden) Johanna Holgersson	6	7
(Switzerland) Santi Wibowo	11	13
(Netherlands) Lonneke Janssen	7	11
(South Korea) Lee Kyung-won	11	11
(Denmark) Christina Sorensen	0	1
(China) Zhou Mi	11	11
(Netherlands) Karina de Wit	6	2
(Japan) Yasuko Mizui	11	13
(Poland) Joanna Szleszynska	5	12
(England) Tracey Hallam	11	11
(Scotland) Sonya McGinn	2	7

Second round
(China) Dai Yun	4	11	11
(Hong Kong) Louisa Koon Wai Chee	11	5	3
(Indonesia) Lidya Djaelawijaya	11	11
(Switzerland) Santi Wibowo	5	5
(South Korea) Lee Kyung-won	11	8	13
(China) Zhou Mi	9	11	10
(Japan) Yasuko Mizui	11	11
(England) Tracey Hallam	6	3

Third round
(China) Dai Yun	11	6	11
(Indonesia) Lidya Djaelawijaya	8	11	3
(South Korea) Lee Kyung-won	11	11
(Japan) Yasuko Mizui	9	5

Quarterfinals
(China) Dai Yun	6	11	11
(South Korea) Lee Kyung-won	11	5	2

=== Section 4 ===
First round
(Denmark) Mette Sørensen	11	11
(Ukraine) Elena Nozdran	7	8
(France) Sandra Dimbour	11	11
(Netherlands) Brenda Beenhakker	3	7
(Sweden) Karolina Ericsson	11	11
(South Korea) Jun Jae Youn	0	3
(Chinese Taipei) Chan Ya-Lin	6	11	11
(Spain) Dolores Marco	11	5	6
(Wales) Kelly Morgan	5	11	13
(China) Ye Zhaoying	11	9	12
(England) Justine Willmott	11	11
(Slovenia) Maja Pohar	8	5
(Russia) Ella Karachkova	10	11	11
(Finland) Anu Weckström	13	5	9
(Japan) Kanako Yonekura	11	13
(India) Aparna Popat	7	11

Second round
(Denmark) Mette Sørensen	11	11
(France) Sandra Dimbour	3	5
(Sweden) Karolina Ericsson	11	5	11
(Chinese Taipei) Chan Ya-Lin	4	11	8
(Wales) Kelly Morgan	11	11
(England) Justine Willmott	6	7
(Russia) Ella Karachkova	11	11
(Japan) Kanako Yonekura	6	6

Third round
(Denmark) Mette Sørensen	11	11	11
(Sweden) Karolina Ericsson	13	9	0
(Wales) Kelly Morgan	11	11
(Russia) Ella Karachkova	6	10

Quarterfinals
(Denmark) Mette Sørensen	9	13	11
(Wales) Kelly Morgan	11	10	8

== Final stage ==
Quarterfinals
(Denmark) Camilla Martin	11	11
(China) Zhang Ning	9	7
(China) Gong Ruina	11	11
(Indonesia) Cindana Hartono	3	2
(China) Dai Yun	6	11	11
(South Korea) Lee Kyung-won	11	5	2
(Denmark) Mette Sørensen	9	13	11
(Wales) Kelly Morgan	11	10	8

Semifinals
(Denmark) Camilla Martin	6	11	11
(China) Gong Ruina	11	9	3
(China) Dai Yun	11	13
(Denmark) Mette Sørensen	8	12

Finals
(Denmark) Camilla Martin	11	6	11
(China) Dai Yun	6	11	10
