= Badminton at the 2000 Summer Olympics – Women's singles =

Olympic event

Women's singles at the Games of the XXVII Olympiad
- Venue: Pavilion 3, Sydney Olympic Park
- Date: 16 – 22 September 2000
- Competitors: 40 from 23 nations

Medalists
1st place, gold medalist(s)		Gong Zhichao	China
2nd place, silver medalist(s)		Camilla Martin	Denmark
3rd place, bronze medalist(s)		Ye Zhaoying	China

These are the results for the women's singles badminton tournament of 2000 Summer Olympics. The tournament was single-elimination. Matches consisted of three sets, with sets being to 11 for women's singles. The tournament was held at Pavilion 3, Sydney Olympic Park.

== Seeds ==
1. Gong Zhichao (CHN) (gold medalist)
2. Camilla Martin (DEN) (silver medalist)
3. Dai Yun (CHN) (fourth place)
4. Ye Zhaoying (CHN) (bronze medalist)
5. Mia Audina (NED) (quarterfinals)
6. Kim Ji-hyun (KOR) (quarterfinals)
7. Lee Kyung-won (KOR) (third round)
8. Yasuko Mizui (JPN) (quarterfinals)

Section	Name	Country
1	Gong Zhichao	China
1	Ling Wan Ting	Hong Kong
1	Sandra Dimbour	France
1	Lidya Djaelawijaya	Indonesia
1	Kara Solmundson	Canada
1	Yasuko Misui	Japan
1	Marina Yakusheva	Russia
1	Maja Pohar	Slovenia
1	Julia Mann	Great Britain
1	Amrita Sawaram	Mauritius
2	Ye Zhaoying	China
2	Judith Meulendijks	Netherlands
2	Takako Ida	Japan
2	Mette Sorensen	Denmark
2	Sujitra Ekmongkolpaisarn	Thailand
2	Lee Kyung-won	South Korea
2	Elena Nozdran	Ukraine
2	Huang Chia-chi	Chinese Taipei
2	Neli Boteva	Bulgaria
2	Kellie Lucas	Australia
3	Nicole Grether	Germany
3	Katarzyna Krasowska	Poland
3	Rhonda Cator	Australia
3	Milaine Cloutier	Canada
3	Kim Ji-hyun	South Korea
3	Kanako Yonekura	Japan
3	Tatiana Vattier	France
3	Anu Weckström	Finland
3	Ella Karachkova	Russia
3	Dai Yun	China
4	Rayoni Head	Australia
4	Robbyn Hermitage	Canada
4	Chan Ya-lin	Chinese Taipei
4	Mia Audina	Netherlands
4	Sonya McGinn	Ireland
4	Kelly Morgan	Great Britain
4	Aparna Popat	India
4	Koon Wai Chee Louisa	Hong Kong
4	Ellen Angelina	Indonesia
4	Camilla Martin	Denmark

== Draw ==
=== Finals ===
Quarterfinals
1	Gong Zhichao (CHN)	11	11
8	Yasuko Mizui (JPN)	6	3
4	Ye Zhaoying (CHN)	11	11
Huang Chia-chi (TPE)	3	4
6	Kim Ji-hyun (KOR)	3	4
3	Dai Yun (CHN)	11	11
5	Mia Audina (NED)	2	1
2	Camilla Martin (DEN)	11	11

Semifinals
1	Gong Zhichao (CHN)	11	11
4	Ye Zhaoying (CHN)	8	8
3	Dai Yun (CHN)	5	0
2	Camilla Martin (DEN)	11	11

Finals
1	Gong Zhichao (CHN)	12	11
2	Camilla Martin (DEN)	10	3
Bronze medal match
4	Ye Zhaoying (CHN)	8	11	11
3	Dai Yun (CHN)	11	2	6

=== Section 1 ===
First round
Lidya Djaelawijaya (INA)	11	11
Kara Solmundson (CAN)	4	4
Julia Mann (GBR)	11	11
Amrita Sawaram (MRI)	0	0

Second round
1	Gong Zhichao (CHN)	11	11
Ling Wanting (HKG)	4	3
Sandra Dimbour (FRA)	1	6
Lidya Djaelawijaya (INA)	11	11
8	Yasuko Mizui (JPN)	11	11
Marina Yakusheva (RUS)	10	6
Maja Pohar (SLO)	4	7
Julia Mann (GBR)	11	11

Third round
1	Gong Zhichao (CHN)	11	11
Lidya Djaelawijaya (INA)	9	3
8	Yasuko Mizui (JPN)	11	11
Julia Mann (GBR)	9	5

Quarterfinals
1	Gong Zhichao (CHN)	11	11
8	Yasuko Mizui (JPN)	6	3

=== Section 2 ===
First round
Mette Sorensen (DEN)	11	13
Sujitra Ekmongkolpaisarn (THA)	7	10
Neli Boteva (BUL)	11	11
Kellie Lucas (AUS)	5	6

Second round
4	Ye Zhaoying (CHN)	11	9	11
Judith Meulendijks (NED)	3	11	7
Takako Ida (JPN)	12	7
Mette Sorensen (DEN)	13	11
7	Lee Kyung-won (KOR)	11	11
Elena Nozdran (UKR)	1	5
Huang Chia-chi (TPE)	11	11
Neli Boteva (BUL)	1	5

Third round
4	Ye Zhaoying (CHN)	11	11
Mette Sorensen (DEN)	4	6
7	Lee Kyung-won (KOR)	9	6
Huang Chia-chi (TPE)	11	11

Quarterfinals
4	Ye Zhaoying (CHN)	11	11
Huang Chia-chi (TPE)	3	4

=== Section 3 ===
First round
Nicole Grether (GER)	13	11
Katarzyna Krasowska (POL)	12	2
Kanako Yonekura (JPN)	11	11
Tatiana Vattier (FRA)	2	3

Second round
Nicole Grether (GER)	11	11
Rhonda Cator (AUS)	3	3
Milaine Cloutier (CAN)	1	3
6	Kim Ji-hyun (KOR)	11	11
Kanako Yonekura (JPN)	11	11
Anu Weckström (FIN)	8	2
Ella Karachkova (RUS)	3	5
3	Dai Yun (CHN)	11	11

Third round
Nicole Grether (GER)	0	3
6	Kim Ji-hyun (KOR)	11	11
Kanako Yonekura (JPN)	2	5
3	Dai Yun (CHN)	11	11

Quarterfinals
6	Kim Ji-hyun (KOR)	3	4
3	Dai Yun (CHN)	11	11

=== Section 4 ===
First round
Rayoni Head (AUS)	11	11
Robbyn Hermitage (CAN)	7	2
Kelly Morgan (GBR)	5	11	11
Aparna Popat (IND)	11	7	2

Second round
Rayoni Head (AUS)	1	1
Chan Ya-lin (TPE)	11	11
5	Mia Audina (NED)	11	11
Sonya McGinn (IRL)	3	6
Kelly Morgan (GBR)	8	11	11
Koon Wai Chee Louisa (HKG)	11	3	1
Ellen Angelina (INA)	6	2
2	Camilla Martin (DEN)	11	11

Third round
Chan Ya-lin (TPE)	2	2
5	Mia Audina (NED)	11	11
Kelly Morgan (GBR)	7	3
2	Camilla Martin (DEN)	11	11

Quarterfinals
5	Mia Audina (NED)	2	1
2	Camilla Martin (DEN)	11	11
