= Wang Chen (badminton) =

Chinese badminton player (born 1976)

Wang Chen 王晨
Personal information
- Born: June 21, 1976 (age 50) Shanghai, China

Sport
- Country: Hong Kong
- Sport: Badminton
- Handedness: Right

Women's singles
- Highest ranking: 1
- BWF profile
Medal record
Women's badminton
Representing Hong Kong
World Championships
| Silver medal – second place | 2007 Kuala Lumpur | Women's singles |
Uber Cup
| Bronze medal – third place | 2002 Guangzhou | Women's team |
Asian Games
| Gold medal – first place | 2006 Doha | Women's singles |
| Bronze medal – third place | 2002 Busan | Women's singles |
| Bronze medal – third place | 2002 Busan | Women's team |
Asian Championships
| Gold medal – first place | 2003 Jakarta | Women's singles |
| Gold medal – first place | 2005 Johor Bahru | Women's singles |
| Gold medal – first place | 2006 Johor Bahru | Women's singles |
| Silver medal – second place | 2001 Manila | Women's singles |
| Silver medal – second place | 2004 Kuala Lumpur | Women's singles |
| Bronze medal – third place | 2002 Bangkok | Women's singles |
| Bronze medal – third place | 2007 Johor Bahru | Women's singles |
| Bronze medal – third place | 2008 Johor Bahru | Women's singles |
East Asian Games
| Bronze medal – third place | 2009 Hong Kong | Women's team |
Representing China
World Championships
| Bronze medal – third place | 1997 Glasgow | Women's singles |
World Cup
| Silver medal – second place | 1996 Jakarta | Women's singles |
Uber Cup
| Silver medal – second place | 1996 Hong Kong | Women's team |
Asian Championships
| Bronze medal – third place | 1995 Beijing | Women's singles |
World Junior Championships
| Gold medal – first place | 1994 Kuala Lumpur | Girls' singles |

Wang Chen (Chinese: 王晨; pinyin: Wáng Chén; Jyutping: wong^{4} san^{4}; born 21 June 1976) is a Chinese badminton player who later represented Hong Kong.

== Career ==
In 1994, Wang won the gold medal at the World Junior Championships in the girls' singles.

In 1996, she won the women's singles title at the Thailand Open. She was also on the losing national team against a strong Indonesian squad in Uber Cup that year.

In 1997, she back-to-back won the Thailand Open women's singles title.

In 2002, she won the Chinese Taipei Open.

In 2003, she won a gold medal at the Asian Championships.

In 2004, Wang played badminton at the 2004 Summer Olympics. In women's singles, she defeated Lorena Blanco of Peru and Yao Jie of the Netherlands in the first two rounds. In the quarterfinals, Wang lost to Zhang Ning of the People's Republic of China 9–11, 11–6, 11–7.

In 2005, she won the Indonesia Open and Asian Championships.

In 2006, she won the gold medal at the Asian Games and for the third times clinched the Asian Championships women's singles title.

In 2007, she played at the World Championships and won the silver medal. She was defeated in the final by Zhu Lin, of China, 8–21, 12–21

Wang competed at the 2008 Summer Olympics. She was seeded fourth going into the competition. She defeated Eva Sládeková of Slovakia, 21–7, 21–7 to advance to the third round. There she lost to Saina Nehwal of India, 19–21, 21–11, 11–21.

She won the 2008 Hong Kong Super Series.

== Personal life ==
Wang married mainland Chinese badminton player Zheng Yumin in 2002. Their son Zheng Xingjun (鄭星駿) Longlong (龍龍) was born in 2012, second son Zheng Xingrong (鄭星榮) was born in 2015.

== Achievements ==
=== World Championships ===
Women's singles
| Year | Venue | Opponent | Score | Result |
|---|---|---|---|---|
| 1997 | Scotstoun Centre; Glasgow, Scotland | (China) Ye Zhaoying | 5–11, 11–5, 4–11 | Bronze |
| 2007 | Putra Indoor Stadium; Kuala Lumpur, Malaysia | (China) Zhu Lin | 8–21, 12–21 | Silver |

=== World Cup ===
Women's singles
| Year | Venue | Opponent | Score | Result |
|---|---|---|---|---|
| 1996 | Istora Senayan; Jakarta, Indonesia | (Indonesia) Susi Susanti | 7–11, 4–11 | Silver |

=== Asian Games ===
Women's singles
| Year | Venue | Opponent | Score | Result |
|---|---|---|---|---|
| 2002 | Gangseo Gymnasium; Busan, South Korea | (China) Zhou Mi | 1–11, 4–11 | Bronze |
| 2006 | Aspire Hall 3 Doha, Qatar | (Hong Kong) Yip Pui Yin | 21–14, 22–20 | Gold |

=== Asian Championships ===
Women's singles
| Year | Venue | Opponent | Score | Result |
|---|---|---|---|---|
| 1995 | Olympic Sports Center Gymnasium; Beijing, China | (China) Ye Zhaoying | 4–11, 11–4, 7–11 | Bronze |
| 2001 | PhilSports Arena; Manila, Philippines | (China) Zhang Ning | 1–11, 3–11 | Silver |
| 2002 | Nimibutr Stadium; Bangkok, Thailand | (China) Zhang Ning | 2–11, 4–11 | Bronze |
| 2003 | Tennis Indoor Senayan; Jakarta, Indonesia | (Indonesia) Silvi Antarini | 11–6, 11–5 | Gold |
| 2004 | Kuala Lumpur Badminton Stadium; Kuala Lumpur, Malaysia | (South Korea) Jun Jae Youn | 9–11, 7–11 | Silver |
| 2005 | Gachibowli Indoor Stadium; Hyderabad, India | (Japan) Kaori Mori | 11–8, 11–4 | Gold |
| 2006 | Bandaraya Stadium; Johor Bahru, Malaysia | (Japan) Kaori Mori | 21–14, 9–21, 21–13 | Gold |
| 2007 | Bandaraya Stadium, Johor Bahru, Malaysia | (China) Jiang Yanjiao | 13–21, 17–21 | Bronze |
| 2008 | Bandaraya Stadium, Johor Bahru, Malaysia | (China) Jiang Yanjiao | 17–21, 16–21 | Bronze |

=== World Junior Championships ===
Girls' singles
| Year | Venue | Opponent | Score | Result |
|---|---|---|---|---|
| 1994 | Kuala Lumpur Badminton Stadium; Kuala Lumpur, Malaysia | (China) Zeng Yaqiong | 3–11, 11–5, 11–4 | Gold |

=== BWF Superseries ===
The BWF Superseries, launched on 14 December 2006 and implemented in 2007, is a series of elite badminton tournaments sanctioned by the Badminton World Federation (BWF). BWF Superseries has two levels, the Superseries and Superseries Premier. A season of Superseries features twelve tournaments around the world, introduced in 2011, with successful players invited to the BWF Superseries Finals held at the year's end.

Women's singles
| Year | Tournament | Opponent | Score | Result |
|---|---|---|---|---|
| 2007 | Indonesia Open | (China) Zhu Lin | 21–14, 21–13 | (gold) Winner |
| 2008 | Hong Kong Open | (China) Xie Xingfang | 21–16, 10–21, 21–10 | (gold) Winner |
| 2008 | Superseries Finals | (Hong Kong) Zhou Mi | 14–21, 18–21 | (silver) Runner-up |

BWF Super Series Finals tournament
BWF Super Series Premier tournament
BWF Super Series tournament

=== BWF Grand Prix ===
The BWF Grand Prix has two levels, the BWF Grand Prix and Grand Prix Gold. It is a series of badminton tournaments sanctioned by the Badminton World Federation (BWF) since 2007. The World Badminton Grand Prix sanctioned by International Badminton Federation since 1983.

Women's singles
| Year | Tournament | Opponent | Score | Result |
|---|---|---|---|---|
| 1995 | Denmark Open | (Sweden) Lim Xiaoqing | 6–11, 3–11 | (silver) Runner-up |
| 1996 | Polish Open | (Indonesia) Meiluawati | 6–11, 4–11 | (silver) Runner-up |
| 1996 | Malaysia Open | (China) Zhang Ning | 7–11, 8–11 | (silver) Runner-up |
| 1996 | Indonesia Open | (Indonesia) Susi Susanti | 8–11, 8–11 | (silver) Runner-up |
| 1996 | China Open | (China) Zhang Ning | 6–11, 6–11 | (silver) Runner-up |
| 1996 | Thailand Open | (South Korea) Kim Ji-hyun | 2–11, 11–5, 11–7 | (gold) Winner |
| 1997 | Thailand Open | (China) Zeng Yaqiong | 11–3, 11–6 | (gold) Winner |
| 2000 | Indonesia Open | (Denmark) Camilla Martin | 9–11, 4–11 | (silver) Runner-up |
| 2001 | Indonesia Open | (Indonesia) Ellen Angelina | 5–7, 3–7, 7–5, 4–7 | (silver) Runner-up |
| 2002 | Chinese Taipei Open | (Thailand) Sujitra Ekmongkolpaisarn | 11–3, 11–1 | (gold) Winner |
| 2003 | Swiss Open | (China) Zhang Ning | Walkover | (silver) Runner-up |
| 2003 | Korea Open | (Netherlands) Mia Audina | 3–11, 13–10, 0–11 | (silver) Runner-up |
| 2003 | Indonesia Open | (China) Xie Xingfang | 6–11, 11–8, 1–11 | (silver) Runner-up |
| 2004 | China Open | (China) Xie Xingfang | 11–5, 3–11, 4–11 | (silver) Runner-up |
| 2005 | Korea Open | (South Korea) Jun Jae-youn | 7–11, 8–11 | (silver) Runner-up |
| 2005 | Indonesia Open | (Netherlands) Mia Audina | 11–7, 11–1 | (gold) Winner |
| 2007 | Chinese Taipei Open | (France) Pi Hongyan | 21–18, 14–21, 26–24 | (gold) Winner |

BWF Grand Prix Gold tournament
BWF Grand Prix tournament

=== IBF International ===
Women's singles
| Year | Tournament | Opponent | Score | Result |
|---|---|---|---|---|
| 1999 | Norwegian International | (South Korea) Kim Ji-hyun | 11–2, 3–11, 6–11 | (silver) Runner-up |
| 2000 | Australia Capital International | (Japan) Kanako Yonekura | 11–6, 11–8 | (gold) Winner |
| 2000 | Waitakere International | (Japan) Kanako Yonekura | 11–1, 11–2 | (gold) Winner |

Women's doubles
| Year | Tournament | Partner | Opponent | Score | Result |
|---|---|---|---|---|---|
| 2000 | Australia Capital International | (Hong Kong) Mei Mei Chan | (New Zealand) Tammy Jenkins (New Zealand) Rhona Robertson | 15–7, 15–4 | (gold) Winner |
| 2000 | Waitakere International | (Hong Kong) Mei Mei Chan | (Australia) Rhonda Cator (Australia) Amanda Hardy | 15–4, 15–12 | (gold) Winner |

== Record against selected opponents ==
Record against year-end Finals finalists, World Championships semi-finalists, and Olympic quarter-finalists.

| Players | Matches | Results | | Difference |
| Players | Matches | Won | Lost | Difference |
|---|---|---|---|---|
| (Bulgaria) Petya Nedelcheva | 5 | 5 | 0 | +5 |
| (China) Dai Yun | 6 | 4 | 2 | +2 |
| (China) Gong Ruina | 10 | 3 | 7 | –4 |
| (China) Gong Zhichao | 4 | 1 | 3 | –2 |
| (China) Li Xuerui | 1 | 0 | 1 | –1 |
| (China) Lu Lan | 8 | 2 | 6 | –4 |
| (China) Wang Lin | 5 | 4 | 1 | +3 |
| (China) Wang Shixian | 2 | 0 | 2 | –2 |
| (China) Wang Yihan | 4 | 1 | 3 | –2 |
| (China) Xie Xingfang | 9 | 2 | 7 | –5 |
| (China) Ye Zhaoying | 4 | 0 | 4 | –4 |
| (China) Zhang Ning | 17 | 3 | 14 | –11 |
| (China) Zhu Lin | 6 | 3 | 3 | 0 |
| (Chinese Taipei) Cheng Shao-chieh | 9 | 8 | 1 | +7 |
| (Chinese Taipei) Huang Chia-chi | 2 | 2 | 0 | +2 |
| (Denmark) Tine Baun | 11 | 5 | 6 | –1 |
| (Denmark) Camilla Martin | 10 | 3 | 7 | –4 |
| (Denmark) Mette Sørensen | 3 | 2 | 1 | +1 |

| Players | Matches | Results | | Difference |
| Players | Matches | Won | Lost | Difference |
|---|---|---|---|---|
| (England) Tracey Hallam | 3 | 2 | 1 | +1 |
| (France) Pi Hongyan | 9 | 7 | 2 | +5 |
| (Germany) Petra Overzier | 2 | 1 | 1 | 0 |
| (Germany) Juliane Schenk | 4 | 4 | 0 | +4 |
| (Germany) / (China) Xu Huaiwen | 4 | 3 | 1 | +2 |
| (Hong Kong) Yip Pui Yin | 1 | 1 | 0 | +1 |
| (Hong Kong) / (China) Zhou Mi | 11 | 4 | 7 | –3 |
| (India) Saina Nehwal | 5 | 4 | 1 | +3 |
| (Indonesia) Susi Susanti | 4 | 1 | 3 | –2 |
| (Indonesia) Maria Kristin Yulianti | 1 | 1 | 0 | +1 |
| (Japan) Yasuko Mizui | 3 | 3 | 0 | +3 |
| (Malaysia) Wong Mew Choo | 5 | 3 | 2 | +1 |
| (Netherlands) / (Indonesia) Mia Audina | 10 | 5 | 5 | 0 |
| (South Korea) Bang Soo-hyun | 1 | 0 | 1 | –1 |
| (South Korea) Kim Ji-hyun | 3 | 2 | 1 | +1 |
| (Sweden) Lim Xiaoqing | 1 | 0 | 1 | –1 |
| (Thailand) Porntip Buranaprasertsuk | 1 | 1 | 0 | +1 |
