= Badminton at the 1998 Asian Games – Women's singles =

Women's singles at the 1998 Asian Games
- Venue: Thammasat Gymnasium 2
- Dates: 13–17 December
- Competitors: 20 from 11 nations

Medalists
gold medal	Kanako Yonekura	Japan
silver medal	Gong Zhichao	China
bronze medal	Sujitra Ekmongkolpaisarn	Thailand
bronze medal	Lee Joo-hyun	South Korea

The badminton women's singles tournament at the 1998 Asian Games in Bangkok took place from 13 December to 17 December at Thammasat Gymnasium 2.

== Schedule ==
All times are Indochina Time (UTC+07:00)

Date	Time	Event
Sunday, 13 December 1998	13:00	1st round
Monday, 14 December 1998	13:00	2nd round
Tuesday, 15 December 1998	13:00	Quarterfinals
Wednesday, 16 December 1998	13:00	Semifinals
Thursday, 17 December 1998	13:00	Final

== Results ==
Legend

- WO — Won by walkover

=== Final ===
Final
	Kanako Yonekura (JPN)	1	11	11
2	Gong Zhichao (CHN)	11	5	6

=== Top half ===
1st round
Woon Sze Mei (MAS)	2	2
Chan Ya-lin (TPE)	11	11
Amparo Lim (PHI)	7	5
Sujitra Ekmongkolpaisarn (THA)	11	11

2nd round
1	Ye Zhaoying (CHN)	11	11
Chandrika de Silva (SRI)	1	7
Kanako Yonekura (JPN)	5	11	11
Chan Ya-lin (TPE)	11	4	10
4	Kim Ji-hyun (KOR)	11	11
Ling Wan Ting (HKG)	6	6
Cindana Hartono Kusuma (INA)	9	5
Sujitra Ekmongkolpaisarn (THA)	11	11

Quarterfinals
1	Ye Zhaoying (CHN)	11	10	9
Kanako Yonekura (JPN)	0	13	11
4	Kim Ji-hyun (KOR)	2	11	5
Sujitra Ekmongkolpaisarn (THA)	11	4	11

Semifinals
Kanako Yonekura (JPN)	11	11
Sujitra Ekmongkolpaisarn (THA)	5	2

=== Bottom half ===
1st round
Takako Ida (JPN)	11	11
Thitikan Duangsiri (THA)	2	2
Ng Mee Fen (MAS)	10	11	11
Koon Wai Chee (HKG)	13	7	6

2nd round
Takako Ida (JPN)	9	12
Lee Joo-hyun (KOR)	11	13
Huang Chia-chi (TPE)	6	9
3	Mia Audina (INA)	11	11
Ng Mee Fen (MAS)	11	11
Aparna Popat (IND)	7	8
Kennie Asuncion (PHI)
2	Gong Zhichao (CHN)	W	O

Quarterfinals
Lee Joo-hyun (KOR)	2	11	11
3	Mia Audina (INA)	11	7	7
Ng Mee Fen (MAS)	7	3
2	Gong Zhichao (CHN)	11	11

Semifinals
Lee Joo-hyun (KOR)	11	4	4
2	Gong Zhichao (CHN)	6	11	11
