= 1999 Sudirman Cup =

Tournament details
- Dates: 10 May – 15 May
- Edition: 6th
- Level: International
- Venue: Brøndbyhallen
- Location: Copenhagen, Denmark

The 1999 Sudirman Cup was the 6th tournament of the World Mixed Team Badminton Championships. It was held from May 10 to May 15, 1999, in Copenhagen, Denmark.

== Teams ==
50 teams around the world took part in this tournament, Zambia also entered but did not play in the tournament.

== Group 1 ==
=== Group A ===
Team	Pld	W	L
China	2	2	0
Indonesia	2	1	1
Malaysia	2	0	2

China
4
Copenhagen, Denmark
10 May 1999

Malaysia
1

			1	2	3
1	(China) (Malaysia)	Zhang Jun / Ge Fei; Chan Chong Ming / Ang Li Peng	15; 2	15; 5
2	(China) (Malaysia)	Gong Zhichao; Woon Sze Mei	11; 1	11; 1
3	(China) (Malaysia)	Sun Jun; Chew Choon Eng	15; 7	15; 4
4	(China) (Malaysia)	Huang Nanyan / Yang Wei; Lim Pek Siah / Joanne Quay	15; 8	15; 3
5	(China) (Malaysia)	Zhang Jun / Zhang Wei; Choong Tan Fook / Lee Wan Wah	9; 15	8; 15

Indonesia
4
Copenhagen, Denmark
11 May 1999

Malaysia
1

			1	2	3
1	(Indonesia) (Malaysia)	Tri Kusharjanto / Minarti Timur; Chan Chong Ming / Joanne Quay	15; 5	15; 6
2	(Indonesia) (Malaysia)	Cindana Hartono Kusuma; Ng Mee Fen	11; 6	11; 1
3	(Indonesia) (Malaysia)	Hendrawan; Ong Ewe Hock	11; 15	15; 8	15; 4
4	(Indonesia) (Malaysia)	Indarti Issolina / Deyana Lomban; Ang Li Peng / Lim Pek Siah	15; 6	15; 9
5	(Indonesia) (Malaysia)	Rexy Mainaky / Ricky Subagja; Choong Tan Fook / Lee Wan Wah	14; 17	12; 15

China
3
Copenhagen, Denmark
12 May 1999

Indonesia
2

			1	2	3
1	(China) (Indonesia)	Ge Fei / Gu Jun; Etty Tantri / Cynthia Tuwankotta	15; 13	15; 2
2	(China) (Indonesia)	Dai Yun; Ellen Angelina	11; 6	11; 3
3	(China) (Indonesia)	Yu Jinhao / Zhang Jun; Tony Gunawan / Candra Wijaya	4; 15	15; 10	8; 15
4	(China) (Indonesia)	Dong Jiong; Taufik Hidayat	11; 15	4; 15
5	(China) (Indonesia)	Liu Yong / Ge Fei; Bambang Suprianto / Zelin Resiana	15; 4	15; 4

=== Group B ===
Team	Pld	W	L
Denmark	2	2	0
South Korea	2	1	1
Sweden	2	0	2

Denmark
3
Copenhagen, Denmark
10 May 1999

South Korea
2

			1	2	3
1	(Denmark) (South Korea)	Jon Holst-Christensen / Ann Jørgensen; Kim Dong-moon / Ra Kyung-min	9; 15	7; 15
2	(Denmark) (South Korea)	Peter Gade; Park Tae-sang	15; 0	15; 1
3	(Denmark) (South Korea)	Camilla Martin; Lee Kyung-won	11; 3	11; 6
4	(Denmark) (South Korea)	Helene Kirkegaard / Rikke Olsen; Chung Jae-hee / Ra Kyung-min	15; 13	15; 10
5	(Denmark) (South Korea)	Jens Eriksen / Jesper Larsen; Ha Tae-kwon / Kim Dong-moon	3; 15	6; 15

South Korea
4
Copenhagen, Denmark
11 May 1999

Sweden
1

			1	2	3
1	(South Korea) (Sweden)	Chung Jae-hee / Ra Kyung-min; Marina Andrievskaya / Catrine Bengtsson	15; 9	15; 10
2	(South Korea) (Sweden)	Ha Tae-kwon / Kim Dong-moon; Peter Axelsson / Pär-Gunnar Jönsson	15; 6	15; 6
3	(South Korea) (Sweden)	Ahn Jae-chang; Tomas Johansson	15; 10	5; 15	10; 15
4	(South Korea) (Sweden)	Kim Ji-hyun; Margit Borg	11; 9	11; 5
5	(South Korea) (Sweden)	Kim Dong-moon / Ra Kyung-min; Peter Axelsson / Catrine Bengtsson	15; 4	15; 8

Denmark
5
Copenhagen, Denmark
12 May 1999

Sweden
0

			1	2	3
1	(Denmark) (Sweden)	Michael Søgaard / Rikke Olsen; Peter Axelsson / Catrine Bengtsson	15; 6	15; 9
2	(Denmark) (Sweden)	Peter Gade; Tomas Johansson	15; 3	15; 5
3	(Denmark) (Sweden)	Camilla Martin; Margit Borg	11; 2	11; 1
4	(Denmark) (Sweden)	Jens Eriksen / Jesper Larsen; Peter Axelsson / Pär-Gunnar Jönsson	15; 11	15; 8
5	(Denmark) (Sweden)	Rikke Olsen / Marlene Thomsen; Marina Andrievskaya / Catrine Bengtsson	15; 5	15; 8

=== Relegation playoff ===
Sweden
4
Copenhagen, Denmark
14 May 1999

Malaysia
1

			1	2	3
1	(Sweden) (Malaysia)	Peter Axelsson / Marina Andrievskaya; Chew Choon Eng / Ang Li Peng	15; 10	15; 13
2	(Sweden) (Malaysia)	Margit Borg; Woon Sze Mei	9; 11	11; 1	11; 0
3	(Sweden) (Malaysia)	Tomas Johansson; Ong Ewe Hock	15; 6	15; 5
4	(Sweden) (Malaysia)	Marina Andrievskaya / Catrine Bengtsson; Lim Pek Siah / Joanne Quay	15; 8	15; 13
5	(Sweden) (Malaysia)	Peter Axelsson / Pär-Gunnar Jönsson; Choong Tan Fook / Lee Wan Wah	9; 15	13; 15

=== Knockout stage ===
==== Semi-finals ====
China
3
Copenhagen, Denmark
14 May 1999

South Korea
2

			1	2	3
1	(China) (South Korea)	Liu Yong / Ge Fei; Kim Dong-moon / Ra Kyung-min	10; 15	15; 10	15; 13
2	(China) (South Korea)	Sun Jun; Ahn Jae-chang	9; 15	15; 6	15; 7
3	(China) (South Korea)	Gong Zhichao; Kim Ji-hyun	9; 11	11; 1	3; 11
4	(China) (South Korea)	Yu Jinhao / Zhang Jun; Lee Dong-soo / Yoo Yong-sung	15; 3	15; 5
5	(China) (South Korea)	Gu Jun / Zhang Ning; Chung Jae-hee / Ra Kyung-min	15; 8	12; 15	11; 15

Denmark
3
Copenhagen, Denmark
14 May 1999

Indonesia
2

			1	2	3
1	(Denmark) (Indonesia)	Michael Søgaard / Rikke Olsen; Tri Kusharyanto / Minarti Timur	15; 12	11; 15	9; 15
2	(Denmark) (Indonesia)	Peter Gade; Taufik Hidayat	15; 4	15; 1
3	(Denmark) (Indonesia)	Camilla Martin; Cindana Hartono Kusuma	11; 4	11; 6
4	(Denmark) (Indonesia)	Jens Eriksen / Jesper Larsen; Tony Gunawan / Candra Wijaya	12; 15	7; 15
5	(Denmark) (Indonesia)	Helene Kirkegaard / Rikke Olsen; Indarti Issolina / Deyana Lomban	17; 15	15; 7

==== Final ====
China
3
Copenhagen, Denmark
15 May 1999

Denmark
1

			1	2	3
1	(China) (Denmark)	Liu Yong / Ge Fei; Jon Holst-Christensen / Ann Jørgensen	10; 15	8; 15
2	(China) (Denmark)	Dai Yun; Camilla Martin	5; 11	11; 9	13; 11
3	(China) (Denmark)	Sun Jun; Peter Gade	15; 13	15; 13
4	(China) (Denmark)	Yu Jinhao / Zhang Jun; Jens Eriksen / Jesper Larsen	15; 13	15; 13
5	(China) (Denmark)	Ge Fei / Gu Jun; Helene Kirkegaard / Rikke Olsen				not played

1999 Sudirman Cup Champions

China
Third title

== Group 2 ==
=== Subgroup 2A ===
Team one	Team two	Score
England	Netherlands	5-0
England	Scotland	5-0
England	Russia	5-0
Netherlands	Scotland	5-0
Netherlands	Russia	4-1
Scotland	Russia	3-2

=== Subgroup 2B ===
Team one	Team two	Score
Thailand	Japan	3-2
Thailand	Germany	2-3
Thailand	Chinese Taipei	4-1
Japan	Germany	3-2
Japan	Chinese Taipei	4-1
Germany	Chinese Taipei	3-2

=== Playoff ===
Team one	Team two	Score	Notes
England	Thailand	3-2	7th-8th
Netherlands	Japan	3-2	9th-10th
Germany	Scotland	5-0	11th-12th
Chinese Taipei	Russia	5-0	13th-14th

== Group 3 ==
=== Subgroup 3A ===
Team one	Team two	Score
India	Canada	2-3
India	Finland	5-0
India	Austria	4-1
Canada	Finland	2-3
Canada	Austria	3-2
Finland	Austria	3-2

=== Subgroup 3B ===
Team one	Team two	Score
Ukraine	Hong Kong	3-2
Ukraine	Australia	4-1
Ukraine	Norway	4-1
Hong Kong	Australia	3-2
Hong Kong	Norway	5-0
Australia	Norway	5-0

=== Playoff ===
Team one	Team two	Score	Notes
Ukraine	India	4-1	15th-16th
Hong Kong	Canada	4-1	17th-18th
Australia	Finland	4-1	19th-20th
Austria	Norway	3-2	21st-22nd

== Group 4 ==
=== Subgroup 4A ===
Team one	Team two	Score
Iceland	Switzerland	5-0
Iceland	United States	2-3
Iceland	Czech Republic	3-2
Switzerland	United States	3-2
Switzerland	Czech Republic	4-1
United States	Czech Republic	4-1

=== Subgroup 4B ===
Team one	Team two	Score
Wales	Bulgaria	4-1
Wales	Poland	4-1
Wales	Belarus	5-0
Bulgaria	Poland	3-2
Bulgaria	Belarus	3-2
Poland	Belarus	3-2

=== Playoff ===
Team one	Team two	Score	Notes
Wales	Iceland	5-0	23rd-24th
Bulgaria	Switzerland	4-1	25th-26th
Poland	United States	5-0	27th-28th
Belarus	Czech Republic	4-1	29th-30th

== Group 5 ==
=== Subgroup 5A ===
Team one	Team two	Score
France	Peru	5-0
France	Israel	5-0
France	Kazakhstan	4-1
Peru	Israel	4-1
Peru	Kazakhstan	3-2
Israel	Kazakhstan	3-2

=== Subgroup 5B ===
Team one	Team two	Score
Belgium	Spain	4-1
Belgium	Portugal	4-1
Belgium	Sri Lanka	4-1
Spain	Portugal	3-2
Spain	Sri Lanka	3-2
Portugal	Sri Lanka	3-2

==== Playoff ====
Team one	Team two	Score	Notes
France	Belgium	4-1	31st-32nd
Spain	Peru	3-2	33rd-34th
Portugal	Israel	4-1	35th-36th
Sri Lanka	Kazakhstan	3-2	37th-38th

== Group 6 ==
=== Subgroup 6A ===
Team one	Team two	Score
South Africa	Slovakia	3-2
South Africa	Lithuania	4-1
South Africa	Mexico	5-0
Slovakia	Lithuania	3-2
Slovakia	Mexico	3-2
Lithuania	Mexico	5-0

=== Subgroup 6B ===
Team one	Team two	Score
Mauritius	Brazil	4-1
Mauritius	Cyprus	4-1
Mauritius	Luxembourg	5-0
Brazil	Cyprus	3-2
Brazil	Luxembourg	4-1
Cyprus	Luxembourg	4-1

=== Playoff ===
Team one	Team two	Score	Notes
Mauritius	South Africa	3-2	39th-40th
Slovakia	Brazil	5-0	41st-42nd
Lithuania	Cyprus	3-2	43rd-44th
Mexico	Luxembourg	5-0	45th-46th

== Group 7 ==
Team one	Team two	Score
Estonia	Nigeria	3-2
Estonia	Latvia	3-2
Estonia	Argentina	5-0
Nigeria	Latvia	3-2
Nigeria	Argentina	5-0
Latvia	Argentina	5-0

== Final classification ==
Group 1
Pos	Country
1	China
2	Denmark
3	Indonesia
3	(South Korea) Korea
5	Sweden
6	Malaysia

Group 2
Pos	Country
7	England
8	Thailand
9	Netherlands
10	Japan
11	Germany
12	Scotland
13	Chinese Taipei
14	Russia

Group 3
Pos	Country
15	Ukraine
16	India
17	Hong Kong
18	Canada
19	Australia
20	Finland
21	Austria
22	Norway

Group 4
Pos	Country
23	Wales
24	Iceland
25	Bulgaria
26	Switzerland
27	Poland
28	United States
29	Belarus
30	Czech Republic

Group 5
Pos	Country
31	France
32	Belgium
33	Spain
34	Peru
35	Portugal
36	Israel
37	Sri Lanka
38	Kazakhstan

Group 6
Pos	Country
39	Mauritius
40	South Africa
41	Slovakia
42	Brazil
43	Lithuania
44	Cyprus
45	Mexico
46	Luxembourg

Group 7
Pos	Country
47	Estonia
48	Nigeria
49	Latvia
50	Argentina

Promoted to higher group
Relegated to lower group
