= Bent Martin =

Danish footballer (born 1943)

Bent Martin (born 19 February 1943) is a Danish former professional footballer who played as a goalkeeper.

He played in Sønderborg Boldklub as a youth player. When serving conscription he moved to Aarhus and joined the local side AGF Aarhus. He won the 1960 Danish championship and 1965 Danish Cup with AGF. When AGF met Scottish club Celtic F.C. in the European Cup Winners' Cup in 1965, Bent Martin impressed the management of Celtic to such a degree that they signed him. Bent Martin joined Celtic from AGF on 4 February 1966. His only first team appearance for the club was in a Glasgow Cup match.

Martin left Celtic on 23 December 1966 in order to join league rivals Dunfermline Athletic on a transfer fee of £3500. He won the Scottish Cup with the club in 1968. In May 1970, Martin moved to Rapid Vienna in Austria, before ending his career playing for AGF in the 1973 season. During his last season he was called up for the Danish national team for a game against Norway in June 1973 but he turned down this opportunity because he was to pass an exam at a banking school on the day of the match.

After retiring, Bent Martin has had various coaching spells such as briefly managing Viborg FF, and serving ten years as a goalkeeping coach in Aarhus Fremad. Since his retirement from football, Bent Martin has had a career in banking in Denmark. Right now he works in a local club in Aarhus called IF Lyseng. He works as a goalkeeping coach.

Bent Martin is the father of the former All England champion in badminton Camilla Martin, and the former Danish footballer Ken Martin.
