= Majken Vange =

Danish badminton player

Personal information
- Born: 29 September 1975 (age 51)
- Height: 1.75 m (5 ft 9 in)
- Weight: 68 kg (150 lb)

Sport
- Country: Denmark
- Sport: Badminton
- Handedness: Right
Medal record
Women's badminton
Representing Denmark
World Championships
Bronze medal – third place	1999 Copenhagen	Women's doubles
European Championships
Silver medal – second place	1998 Sofia	Women's doubles
European Mixed Team Championships
Gold medal – first place	1998 Sofia	Mixed team

Majken Grethe Vange (later Hildebrand, born 29 September 1975) is a retired female badminton player from Denmark.

== Career ==
She won a bronze medal at the 1999 IBF World Championships in women's doubles with Ann Jørgensen; they also competed at the 2000 Summer Olympics.

== Achievements ==
=== World Championships ===
Women's doubles
Year	Venue	Partner	Opponent	Score	Result
1999	Brøndby Arena; Copenhagen, Denmark	(Denmark) Ann Jørgensen	(South Korea) Chung Jae-hee (South Korea) Ra Kyung-min	10–15, 15–7, 10–15	Bronze

=== European Championships ===
Women's doubles
Year	Venue	Partner	Opponent	Score	Result
1998	Winter Sports Palace; Sofia, Bulgaria	(Denmark) Ann Jørgensen	(Denmark) Rikke Olsen (Denmark) Marlene Thomsen	2–15, 10–15	Silver

=== IBF World Grand Prix ===
The World Badminton Grand Prix was sanctioned by the International Badminton Federation (IBF) from 1983 to 2006.

Women's doubles
Year	Tournament	Partner	Opponent	Score	Result
1997	Russian Open	(Denmark) Ann Jørgensen	(Denmark) Rikke Olsen (Denmark) Helene Kirkegaard	2–15, 9–15	(silver) Runner-up
1997	Denmark Open	(Denmark) Ann Jørgensen	(Japan) Yoshiko Iwata (Japan) Haruko Matsuda	18–16, 15–5	(gold) Winner
1999	Swiss Open	(Denmark) Ann Jørgensen	(Denmark) Rikke Olsen (Denmark) Mette Sorensen	2–15, 0–15	(silver) Runner-up
2001	U.S. Open	(Denmark) Pernille Harder	(South Korea) Kim Kyeung-ran (South Korea) Ra Kyung-min	1–7, 0–7, 3–7	(silver) Runner-up
2001	Dutch Open	(Denmark) Pernille Harder	(Russia) Anastasia Russkikh (China) Xu Huaiwen	7–3, 2–7, 0–7, 7–4, 5–7	(silver) Runner-up

Mixed doubles
Year	Tournament	Partner	Opponent	Score	Result
1996	French Open	(Denmark) Jesper Larsen	(Ukraine) Vladislav Druzchenko (Ukraine) Victoria Evtoushenko	15–8, 14–17, 15–11	(gold) Winner
2001	U.S. Open	(Denmark) Mathias Boe	(Canada) William Milroy (Canada) Denyse Julien	7–2, 7–3, 7–1	(gold) Winner

=== IBF International ===
Women's doubles
Year	Tournament	Partner	Opponent	Score	Result
1994	Amor Tournament	(Denmark) Ann Jørgensen	(Denmark) Rikke Olsen (Denmark) Charlotte Madsen	15–12, 15–9	(gold) Winner
1995	Portugal International	(Denmark) Mette Hansen	(England) Sarah Hore (Wales) Kelly Morgan	15–6, 14–17, 15–12	(gold) Winner
1995	Polish Open	(Denmark) Mette Pedersen	(Indonesia) Emma Ermawati (Indonesia) Indarti Issolina	13–15, 8–15	(silver) Runner-up
1995	Czech International	(Denmark) Pernille Harder	(Denmark) Michelle Rasmussen (Denmark) Mette Sorensen	9–15, 7–15	(silver) Runner-up
1995	Norwegian International	(Denmark) Pernille Harder	(Denmark) Gitte Jansson (Denmark) Mette Schjoldager	7–15, 12–15	(silver) Runner-up
1995	Irish International	(Denmark) Pernille Harder	(Denmark) Rikke Olsen (Denmark) Mette Schjoldager	15–10, 4–15, 15–9	(gold) Winner
1996	Austrian International	(Denmark) Pernille Harder	(Denmark) Gitte Jansson (Denmark) Mette Schjoldager	15–6, 15–12	(gold) Winner
1996	Irish International	(Denmark) Michelle Rasmussen	(Denmark) Tanja Berg (Denmark) Mette Pedersen	3–15, 15–12, 12–15	(silver) Runner-up
2000	Scottish International	(Denmark) Pernille Harder	(Switzerland) Judith Baumeyer (Switzerland) Santi Wibowo	15–2, 15–2	(gold) Winner
2002	Le Volant d'Or de Toulouse	(Denmark) Helle Nielsen	(Japan) Akiko Nakashima (Japan) Chihiro Ohsaka	6–11, 10–13	(silver) Runner-up
2003	Dutch International	(Denmark) Helle Nielsen	(Russia) Elena Sukhareva (Russia) Natalya Gorodnicheva	11–4, 11–8	(gold) Winner

Mixed doubles
Year	Tournament	Partner	Opponent	Score	Result
1995	Portugal International	(Denmark) Jan Jørgensen	(Denmark) Peder Nissen (Denmark) Mette Hansen	5–15, 15–7, 8–15	(silver) Runner-up
1996	Malmö International	(Denmark) Jesper Larsen	(Sweden) Robert Larsson (Sweden) Maria Bengtsson	5–15, 11–15	(silver) Runner-up
1996	Irish International	(Denmark) Jesper Larsen	(Denmark) Jonas Rasmussen (Denmark) Ann-Lou Jørgensen	15–10, 8–15, 15–9	(gold) Winner
2002	Le Volant d'Or de Toulouse	(Denmark) Jonas Glyager Jensen	(Denmark) Carsten Mogensen (Denmark) Kamilla Rytter Juhl	11–5, 11–8	(gold) Winner
2003	Dutch International	(Denmark) Jonas Glyager Jensen	(Denmark) Peter Steffensen (Denmark) Helle Nielsen	9–11, 6–11	(silver) Runner-up
