= Dai Yun =

Chinese badminton player (born 1977)

Dai Yun 戴韫
Personal information
- Born: 22 November 1977 (age 48) Nanjing, Jiangsu, China
- Height: 1.75 m (5 ft 9 in)
- Weight: 63 kg (139 lb)
- Spouse: Liu Yong (m. 2004)

Sport
- Country: China
- Sport: Badminton
- Handedness: Left

Women's singles
- Highest ranking: 1
- BWF profile
Medal record
Women's badminton
Representing China
World Championships
Silver medal – second place	1999 Copenhagen	Women's singles
Sudirman Cup
Gold medal – first place	1999 Copenhagen	Mixed team
Uber Cup
Gold medal – first place	2002 Guangzhou	Women's team
Gold medal – first place	2000 Kuala Lumpur	Women's team
Gold medal – first place	1998 Hong Kong	Women's team
Asian Games
Gold medal – first place	2002 Busan	Women's team
Gold medal – first place	1998 Bangkok	Women's team
Asian Championships
Bronze medal – third place	2003 Jakarta	Women's singles
Bronze medal – third place	1999 Kualalumpur	Women's singles
Bronze medal – third place	1998 Bangkok	Women's singles
World Junior Championships
Bronze medal – third place	1994 Kuala Lumpur	Girls' singles

Dai Yun (simplified Chinese: 戴韫; traditional Chinese: 戴韞; pinyin: Dài Yùn; born 22 November 1977) is a Chinese former badminton player.

== Career ==
At the beginning of the century Dai was ranked among the world's leading women's singles players, most of whom were her fellow countrywomen. Her titles included the Chinese Taipei (1999), Malaysia (1999), Thailand (1999, 2003), and Swiss (2000) Opens. She was a highly effective member of consecutive world champion Chinese Uber Cup (women's international) teams in 1998, 2000, 2002. However, in badminton's three most prestigious competitions for individual players – the All-England Championships, the World Championships, and the Olympic Games – victory eluded Dai. She was a runner-up to Chinese teammates at the 1999 and 2000 All-Englands. At the 1999 World Championships in Copenhagen she reached the final only to lose the closest of matches to Denmark's Camilla Martin. At the 2000 Olympics in Sydney she was beaten by Martin, again, in the semifinals, and then lost a close bronze medal match to fellow countrywoman Ye Zhaoying. Dai's results slipped somewhat after 2000, and she retired from international play in 2004.

She is married to another former Chinese badminton player, Liu Yong.

== Achievements ==
=== World Championships ===
Women's singles
Year	Venue	Opponent	Score	Result
1999	Brøndby Arena; Copenhagen, Denmark	(Denmark) Camilla Martin	6–11, 11–6, 10–11	Silver

=== Asian Championships ===
Women's singles
Year	Venue	Opponent	Score	Result
2003	Tennis Indoor Gelora Bung Karno; Jakarta, Indonesia	(Hong Kong) Wang Chen	1–11, 11–2, 9–11	Bronze
1999	Kualalumpur, Malaysia	(China) Zhang Ning	11–9, 3–11, 4–11	Bronze
1998	Bangkok, Thailand	(China) Ye Zhaoying	Walkover	Bronze

=== IBF World Grand Prix ===
Women's singles
Year	Tournament	Opponent	Score	Result
2003	Dutch Open	(Netherlands) Yao Jie	10–13, 0–3^{r}	(silver) Runner-up
2003	Thailand Open	(Japan) Kanako Yonekura	11–7, 11–8	(gold) Winner
2002	Japan Open	(China) Zhou Mi	1–7, 0–7, 1–7	(silver) Runner-up
2001	Singapore Open	(China) Zhang Ning	1–7, 7–4, 2–7	(silver) Runner-up
2000	Malaysia Open	(China) Gong Zhichao	6–11, 8–11	(silver) Runner-up
2000	Swiss Open	(China) Gong Ruina	11–5, 13–12	(gold) Winner
2000	All England Open	(China) Gong Zhichao	5–11, 11–8, 5–11	(silver) Runner-up
1999	Thailand Open	(China) Gong Ruina	11–6, 11–5	(gold) Winner
1999	Malaysia Open	(China) Gong Ruina	11–6, 11–3	(gold) Winner
1999	All England Open	(China) Ye Zhaoying	11–9, 5–11, 1–11	(silver) Runner-up
1999	Chinese Taipei Open	(China) Zhou Mi	11–5, 11–8	(gold) Winner
1998	Malaysia Open	(China) Zhang Ning	1–11, 3–11	(silver) Runner-up
1997	China Open	(China) Gong Zhichao	1–11, 5–11	(silver) Runner-up
1997	U.S. Open	(Denmark) Camilla Martin	4–11, 11–6, 10–12	(silver) Runner-up
1994	German Open	(Sweden) Lim Xiaoqing	10–12, 4–11	(silver) Runner-up

== Record against selected opponents ==
Record against year-end Finals finalists, World Championships semi-finalists, and Olympic quarter-finalists.

Players	Matches	Results		Difference
Players	Matches	Won	Lost	Difference
(China) Gong Ruina	6	4	2	+2
(China) Gong Zhichao	8	2	6	–4
(China) Han Jingna	1	1	0	+1
(China) Xie Xingfang	3	2	1	+1
(China) Yao Yan	1	1	0	+1
(China) Ye Zhaoying	10	1	9	–8
(China) Zhang Ning	8	2	6	–4
(China) Zhou Mi	6	3	3	0
(Chinese Taipei) Huang Chia-chi	4	3	1	+2
(Denmark) Tine Baun	1	1	0	+1
(Denmark) Camilla Martin	14	5	9	–4

Players	Matches	Results		Difference
Players	Matches	Won	Lost	Difference
(Denmark) Mette Sørensen	2	2	0	+2
(France) Pi Hongyan	1	0	1	–1
(Hong Kong) / (China) Wang Chen	6	2	4	–2
(Indonesia) Susi Susanti	3	0	3	–3
(Japan) Yasuko Mizui	3	3	0	+3
(Malaysia) Wong Mew Choo	1	1	0	+1
(Netherlands) / (Indonesia) Mia Audina	4	4	0	+4
(South Korea) Bang Soo-hyun	1	0	1	–1
(South Korea) Kim Ji-hyun	6	4	2	+2
(Sweden) Lim Xiaoqing	1	0	1	–1
