= Karolina Ericsson =

Swedish badminton player

Personal information
- Born: 5 June 1973 (age 53)
- Height: 1.73 m (5 ft 8 in)

Sport
- Country: Sweden
- Sport: Badminton
- Handedness: Right
- Event: Women's singles & doubles

Women's singles & doubles
- BWF profile
Medal record
Women's badminton
Representing Sweden
Uber Cup
| Bronze medal – third place | 1994 Jakarta | Women's team |
European Mixed Team Championships
| Silver medal – second place | 1996 Herning | Mixed team |
| Bronze medal – third place | 1998 Sofia | Mixed team |
European Junior Championships
| Bronze medal – third place | 1991 Budapest | Girls' doubles |

Karolina Ericsson (born 5 June 1973) is a retired Swedish badminton player. She represented her country in the World Championships in the years 1997 and 1999. Ericsson also qualified to compete at the 1998 World Grand Prix Finals in Bandar Seri Begawan, Brunei.

== Achievements ==
=== European Junior Championships ===
Girls' doubles
| Year | Venue | Partner | Opponent | Score | Result |
|---|---|---|---|---|---|
| 1991 | BMTE-Törley impozáns sportcsarnokában Budapest, Hungary | (Sweden) Lotta Andersson | (Denmark) Mette Pedersen (Denmark) Trine Pedersen | 9–15, 7–15 | Bronze |

=== IBF International ===
Women's singles
| Year | Tournament | Opponent | Score | Result |
|---|---|---|---|---|
| 1999 | Iceland International | (Czech Republic) Markéta Koudelková | 8–11, 11–5, 13–10 | (gold) Winner |
| 1998 | BMW Open | (Netherlands) Karina de Wit | 2–11, 11–6, 11–4 | (gold) Winner |
| 1998 | Norwegian International | (Sweden) Marina Andrievskaya | 4–11, 3–11 | (silver) Runner-up |
| 1997 | Irish International | (Denmark) Christina Sørensen | 11–7, 12–10 | (gold) Winner |
| 1997 | Norwegian International | (Sweden) Kristin Evernas | 11–9, 9–1, 7–9, 9–1 | (gold) Winner |
| 1997 | French International | (Wales) Kelly Morgan | 9–12, 3–11 | (silver) Runner-up |
| 1996 | Welsh International | (Wales) Kelly Morgan | 4–11, 4–11 | (silver) Runner-up |
| 1996 | Portugal International | (Denmark) Michelle Rasmussen | 11–7, 6–11, 12–10 | (gold) Winner |
| 1995 | Norwegian International | (Sweden) Marina Andrievskaya | 7–11, 10–12 | (silver) Runner-up |
| 1995 | Portugal International | (Denmark) Anne Søndergaard | 11–9, 1–11, 1–11 | (silver) Runner-up |
| 1994 | Irish International | (Sweden) Margit Borg | 4–11, 8–11 | (silver) Runner-up |
| 1993 | Irish International | (England) Joanne Muggeridge | 11–12, 0–11 | (silver) Runner-up |
| 1992 | Uppsala International | (Sweden) Emma Edbom | 11–9, 3–11, 5–11 | (silver) Runner-up |

Women's doubles
| Year | Tournament | Partner | Opponent | Score | Result |
|---|---|---|---|---|---|
| 1994 | Norwegian International | (Sweden) Ulrika Persson | (Sweden) Maria Bengtsson (Sweden) Margit Borg | 0–15, 3–15 | (silver) Runner-up |
| 1994 | Victor Cup | (Sweden) Lotta Andersson | (Germany) Katrin Schmidt (Germany) Nicole Tummer | 15–11, 15–8 | (gold) Winner |
