= 1999 IBF World Championships =

Tournament details
- Dates: 16 May – 23 May
- Edition: 11th
- Level: International
- Venue: Brøndby Arena
- Location: Copenhagen, Denmark

The 1999 IBF World Championships (World Badminton Championships) were held in Copenhagen, Denmark, between 16 May and 23 May 1999. During men's single semi final match between Fung Permadi and Peter Gade, a historical decision was made by Permadi. The score was 14 all in the third set with Gade held the match point. Commonly, a serve receiver will opt for deuce. At odds Permadi refused it. Disturbed with the peculiar, Gade fouled his serve then returned Permadi's serve to the net and lost the match by the score 14–15. The same scenario happened in the women final match. Camilla Martin chose not to play the deuce and won against Dai Yun. She was engaged to Gade then and subsequently avenged for her fiancée.

== Host city selection ==
Copenhagen, Denmark, was chosen over Gothenburg, Sweden, as the host for 1999 IBF World Championships.

== Medalists ==
=== Medal table ===
* Host nation (Denmark)

Rank	Nation	Gold	Silver	Bronze	Total
1	South Korea	2	2	1	5
2	China	2	1	4	7
3	Denmark	1	0	5	6
4	England	0	1	1	2
5	Chinese Taipei	0	1	0	1
Totals (5 entries)		5	5	11	21

=== Events ===
Event	Gold	Silver	Bronze
Men's Singles	(China) Sun Jun	(Chinese Taipei) Fung Permadi	(Denmark) Peter Gade
Men's Singles	(China) Sun Jun	(Chinese Taipei) Fung Permadi	(Denmark) Poul-Erik Høyer Larsen
Women's Singles	(Denmark) Camilla Martin	(China) Dai Yun	(China) Gong Ruina
Women's Singles	(Denmark) Camilla Martin	(China) Dai Yun	(Denmark) Mette Sørensen
Men's Doubles	(South Korea) Ha Tae-kwon (South Korea) Kim Dong-moon	(South Korea) Lee Dong-soo (South Korea) Yoo Yong-sung	(China) Zhang Wei (China) Zhang Jun
Men's Doubles	(South Korea) Ha Tae-kwon (South Korea) Kim Dong-moon	(South Korea) Lee Dong-soo (South Korea) Yoo Yong-sung	(England) Simon Archer (England) Nathan Robertson
Women's Doubles	(China) Ge Fei (China) Gu Jun	(South Korea) Ra Kyung-min (South Korea) Chung Jae-hee	(China) Qin Yiyuan (China) Gao Ling
Women's Doubles	(China) Ge Fei (China) Gu Jun	(South Korea) Ra Kyung-min (South Korea) Chung Jae-hee	(Denmark) Ann Jørgensen (Denmark) Majken Vange
Mixed Doubles	(South Korea) Kim Dong-moon (South Korea) Ra Kyung-min	(England) Simon Archer (England) Joanne Goode	(China) Liu Yong (China) Ge Fei
Mixed Doubles	(South Korea) Kim Dong-moon (South Korea) Ra Kyung-min	(England) Simon Archer (England) Joanne Goode	(Denmark) Michael Søgaard (Denmark) Rikke Olsen
