= Camilla Martin =

Danish badminton player

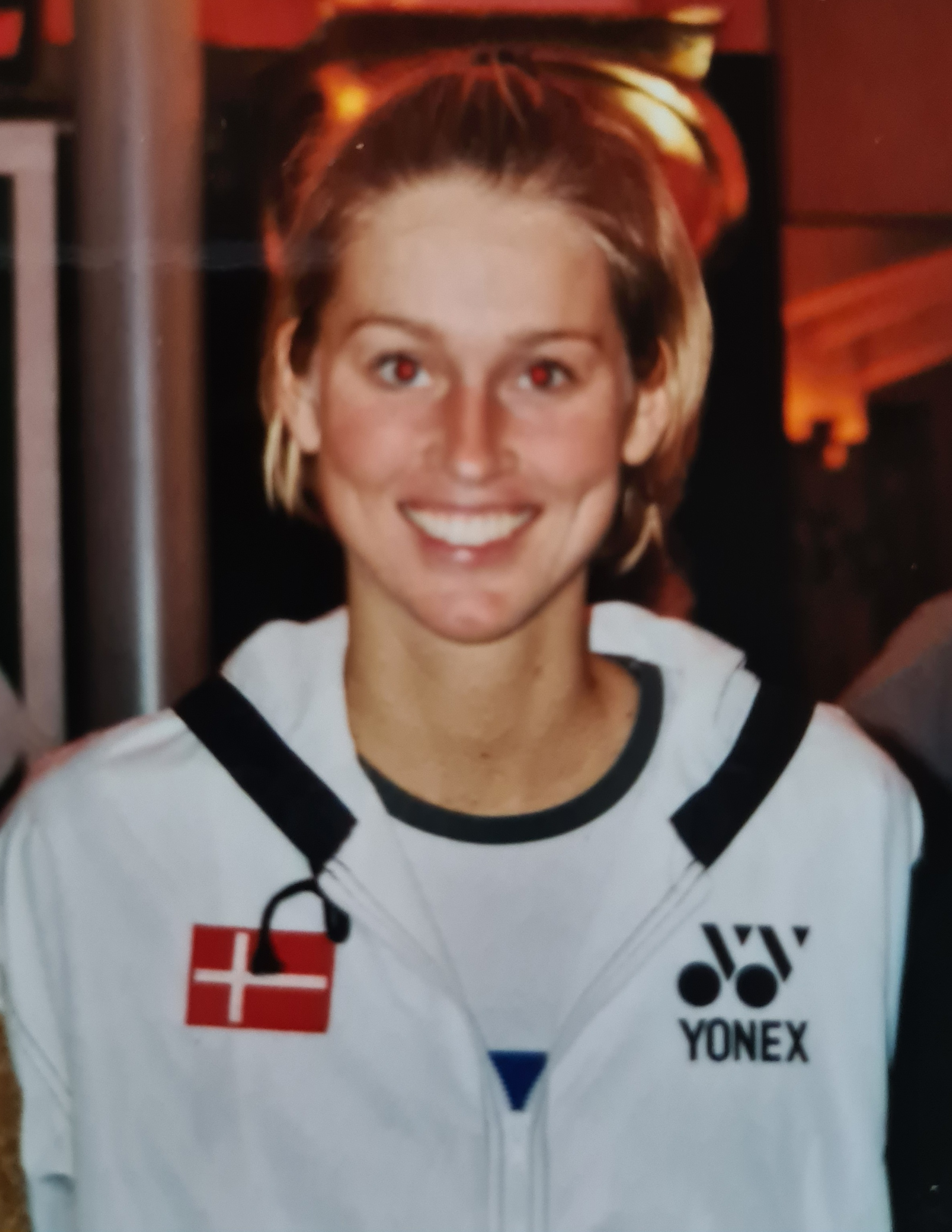
- Martin in 1998

Personal information
- Full name: Camilla Martin Nygaard
- Born: 23 March 1974 (age 52) Aarhus, Denmark
- Height: 1.74 m (5 ft 9 in)
- Weight: 59 kg (130 lb)
- Spouse: Lars Nygaard (m. 2005)

Sport
- Country: Denmark
- Sport: Badminton
- Handedness: Right

Women's singles
- Career record: 373 wins, 103 losses
- Highest ranking: 1
- BWF profile
Medal record
Women's badminton
Representing Denmark
Olympic Games
Silver medal – second place	2000 Sydney	Women's singles
World Championships
Gold medal – first place	1999 Copenhagen	Women's singles
World Cup
Bronze medal – third place	1994 Ho Chi Minh	Women's singles
Sudirman Cup
Silver medal – second place	1999 Copenhagen	Mixed team
Bronze medal – third place	1995 Lausanne	Mixed team
Bronze medal – third place	1997 Glasgow	Mixed team
Bronze medal – third place	2001 Seville	Mixed team
Bronze medal – third place	2003 Eindhoven	Mixed team
Uber Cup
Silver medal – second place	2000 Kuala Lumpur	Women's team
Bronze medal – third place	1996 Hong Kong	Women's team
Bronze medal – third place	1998 Hong Kong	Women's team
Bronze medal – third place	2004 Jakarta	Women's team
European Championships
Gold medal – first place	1996 Herning	Women's singles
Gold medal – first place	1998 Sofia	Women's singles
Gold medal – first place	2000 Glasgow	Women's singles
Silver medal – second place	1992 Glasgow	Women's singles
Bronze medal – third place	2002 Malmö	Women's singles
Bronze medal – third place	2004 Geneva	Women's singles
European Mixed Team Championships
Gold medal – first place	1996 Herning	Mixed team
Gold medal – first place	1998 Sofia	Mixed team
Gold medal – first place	2000 Glasgow	Mixed team
Gold medal – first place	2002 Malmö	Mixed team
Gold medal – first place	2004 Geneva	Mixed team
European Junior Championships
Gold medal – first place	1989 Manchester	Girls' singles
Gold medal – first place	1989 Manchester	Mixed team
Silver medal – second place	1989 Manchester	Girls' doubles

Camilla Martin Nygaard (née Martin; born 23 March 1974) is a Danish retired badminton player. She and Lene Køppen, who played two decades earlier, are the only Danish women to have won both the All England and World Championships singles titles.

== Career ==
She primarily played woman's singles. In that discipline she won the Danish national championships 13 years consecutively, from 1991 to 2003, European champion three times, in 1996, 1998, and 2000, and World champion once in 1999. She won All England Open in 2002.

The only major tournament that she never won was the Olympic Games. She earned silver in 2000 Olympics after losing to Gong Zhichao of China in the final.

In Camilla Martin's last year as an elite player, she played at the 2004 Olympics, defeating Kanako Yonekura of Japan in the first round but losing to Tracey Hallam of Great Britain in the round of 16.

She helped Denmark win the European team championship in 1996, 1998, 2000, 2002 and 2004.

== Personal life ==
Camilla Martin is the daughter of the former Danish footballer Bent Martin. Her brother is the former Danish footballer Ken Martin.

She married economist Lars Nygaard 25 May 2005, and changed her name to Camilla Martin Nygaard.

She currently works as a sports presenter for TV 2.

== Achievements ==
=== Olympic Games ===
Women's singles
Year	Venue	Opponent	Score	Result
2000	The Dome; Sydney, Australia	(China) Gong Zhichao	10–13, 3–11	Silver

=== World Championships ===
Women's singles
Year	Venue	Opponent	Score	Result
1999	Brøndby Arena; Copenhagen, Denmark	(China) Dai Yun	11–6, 6–11, 11–10	Gold

=== World Cup ===
Women's singles
Year	Venue	Opponent	Score	Result
1994	Phan Đình Phùng Indoor Stadium; Ho Chi Minh City, Vietnam	(Indonesia) Susi Susanti	10–12, 1–11	Bronze

=== European Championships ===
Women's singles
Year	Venue	Opponent	Score	Result
1992	Kelvin Hall; Glasgow, Scotland	(Denmark) Pernille Nedergaard	10–12, 11–6, 7–11	Silver
1996	Herning Badminton Klub; Herning, Denmark	(Russia) Marina Yakusheva	11–0, 11–3	Gold
1998	Winter Sports Palace; Sofia, Bulgaria	(Wales) Kelly Morgan	11–2, 11–4	Gold
2000	Kelvin Hall International Sports Arena, Glasgow, Scotland	(Sweden) Marina Andrievskaya	13–10, 11–3	Gold
2002	Baltiska hallen Malmö, Sweden	(Netherlands) Yao Jie	7–0, 7–2, 0–7, 3–7, 1–7	Bronze
2004	Queue d’Arve Sport Center; Geneva, Switzerland	(Netherlands) Mia Audina	4–11, 13–10, 8–11	Bronze

=== World Junior Championships ===
The Bimantara World Junior Championships was an international invitation badminton tournament for junior players. It was held in Jakarta, Indonesia from 1987 to 1991.

Girls' singles
Year	Venue	Opponent	Score	Result
1989	Jakarta, Indonesia	(South Korea) Kim Ji-hyun	5–11, 7–11	Silver
1990	Jakarta, Indonesia	(China) Li Lijun	9–11, 2–11	Bronze

=== European Junior Championships ===
Girls' singles
Year	Venue	Opponent	Score	Result
1989	Armitage Centre; Manchester, England	(Denmark) Helene Kirkegaard	11–4, 11–4	Gold

Girls' doubles
Year	Venue	Partner	Opponent	Score	Result
1989	Armitage Centre; Manchester, England	(Denmark) Helene Kirkegaard	(Denmark) Marlene Thomsen (Denmark) Trine Johansson	5–15, 15–13, 5–15	Silver

=== IBF World Grand Prix ===
The World Badminton Grand Prix was sanctioned by the International Badminton Federation from 1983 to 2006.

Women's singles
Year	Tournament	Opponent	Score	Result
1990	German Open	(Denmark) Pernille Nedergaard	9–12, 8–11	(silver) Runner-up
1993	Canadian Open	(Denmark) Pernille Nedergaard	11–5, 11–5	(gold) Winner
1993	Dutch Open	(Indonesia) Susi Susanti	7–11, 1–11	(silver) Runner-up
1993	Finnish Open	(Denmark) Pernille Nedergaard	11–12, 12–11, 11–7	(gold) Winner
1993	Scottish Open	(Canada) Denyse Julien	11–6, 11–8	(gold) Winner
1994	Swiss Open	(Indonesia) Ika Henny	11–5, 11–1	(gold) Winner
1994	Denmark Open	(Sweden) Lim Xiaoqing	11–5, 5–11, 12–11	(gold) Winner
1995	Swiss Open	(Sweden) Lim Xiaoqing	11–7, 11–7	(gold) Winner
1995	All England Open	(Sweden) Lim Xiaoqing	9–11, 12–10, 7–11	(silver) Runner-up
1995	German Open	(Indonesia) Mia Audina	11–6, 11–6	(gold) Winner
1996	Swiss Open	(Indonesia) Yuliani Sentosa	4–11, 11–6, 11–2	(gold) Winner
1996	U.S. Open	(Indonesia) Mia Audina	5–11, 9–12	(silver) Runner-up
1996	Hong Kong Open	(Indonesia) Mia Audina	11–8, 11–6	(gold) Winner
1997	Chinese Taipei Open	(Indonesia) Mia Audina	12–10, 11–2	(gold) Winner
1997	Swiss Open	(China) Ye Zhaoying	9–12, 11–6, 11–5	(gold) Winner
1997	U.S. Open	(China) Dai Yun	11–4, 6–11, 12–10	(gold) Winner
1997	German Open	(Sweden) Marina Andrievskaya	11–7, 11–2	(gold) Winner
1997	Denmark Open	(Denmark) Mette Pedersen	11–2, 11–8	(gold) Winner
1998	Swiss Open	(China) Ye Zhaoying	12–9, 11–8	(gold) Winner
1998	Denmark Open	(China) Ye Zhaoying	13–10, 11–8	(gold) Winner
1998	Hong Kong Open	(Indonesia) Lidya Djaelawijaya	11–3, 11–0	(gold) Winner
1999	Denmark Open	(China) Zhou Mi	8–11, 11–3, 11–1	(gold) Winner
2000	Korea Open	(Japan) Kanako Yonekura	11–6, 11–6	(gold) Winner
2000	Indonesia Open	(China) Wang Chen	11–9, 11–4	(gold) Winner
2000	Denmark Open	(China) Zhou Mi	11–1, 6–11, 7–11	(silver) Runner-up
2001	Korea Open	(South Korea) Kim Ji-hyun	11–7, 8–11, 13–10	(gold) Winner
2001	Denmark Open	(China) Pi Hongyan	8–6, 7–3, 7–0	(gold) Winner
2002	All England Open	(China) Gong Ruina	7–5, 8–6, 7–3	(gold) Winner
2002	Malaysia Open	(China) Hu Ting	8–11, 6–11	(silver) Runner-up
2002	Denmark Open	(China) Gong Ruina	11–5, 3–11, 11–7	(gold) Winner
2003	Japan Open	(China) Xie Xingfang	11–1, 11–5	(gold) Winner
2003	Malaysia Open	(China) Zhou Mi	1–11, 11–7, 5–11	(silver) Runner-up
2003	German Open	(China) Zhang Ning	7–11, 3–11	(silver) Runner-up

Women's doubles
Year	Tournament	Partner	Opponent	Score	Result
1993	Finnish Open	(Denmark) Marlene Thomsen	(Russia) Marina Andrievskaya (Russia) Marina Yakusheva	15–1, 15–3	(gold) Winner

=== IBF International ===
Women's singles
Year	Tournament	Opponent	Score	Result
1989	Norwegian International	(Soviet Union) Irina Serova	11–2, 11–3	(gold) Winner
1990	Polish Open	(China) Chen Ying	11–4, 7–11, 1–11	(silver) Runner-up
1990	Czechoslovakian International	(Denmark) Helle Andersen	11–8, 11–1	(gold) Winner
1993	Amor International	(Netherlands) Monique Hoogland	11–5, 11–7	(gold) Winner
1994	Hamburg Cup	(Netherlands) Monique Hoogland	11–3, 11–2	(gold) Winner

Women's doubles
Year	Tournament	Partner	Opponent	Score	Result
1989	Norwegian International	(Denmark) Lotte Olsen	(Soviet Union) Svetlana Beliasova (Soviet Union) Irina Serova	15–10, 15–10	(gold) Winner
1990	Polish International	(Denmark) Helene Kirkegaard	(China) Chen Ying (China) Sheng Wengqing	15–18, 1–15	(silver) Runner-up
1990	Czechoslovakian International	(Denmark) Helene Kirkegaard	(Denmark) Trine Johansson (Denmark) Marlene Thomsen	14–17, 8–15	(silver) Runner-up

== Record against selected opponents ==
Record against year-end Finals finalists, World Championships semi-finalists, and Olympic quarter-finalists.

Players	Matches	Results		Difference
Players	Matches	Won	Lost	Difference
(Australia) Anna Lao	1	0	1	–1
(China) Dai Yun	14	9	5	+4
(China) Gong Ruina	11	8	3	+5
(China) Gong Zhichao	3	0	3	–3
(China) Han Jingna	4	2	2	0
(China) Tang Jiuhong	3	0	3	–3
(China) Xie Xingfang	5	3	2	+1
(China) Yao Yan	1	1	0	+1
(China) Ye Zhaoying	9	3	6	–3
(China) Zhang Ning	15	6	9	–3
(China) Zhou Mi	10	5	5	0
(China) Zhu Lin	2	2	0	+2
(Chinese Taipei) Cheng Shao-chieh	1	1	0	+1
(Chinese Taipei) Huang Chia-chi	5	5	0	+5

Players	Matches	Results		Difference
Players	Matches	Won	Lost	Difference
(Denmark) Mette Sørensen	3	2	1	+1
(England) Tracey Hallam	2	1	1	0
(France) / (China) Pi Hongyan	5	3	2	+1
(Germany) Petra Overzier	2	2	0	+2
(Germany) Juliane Schenk	3	3	0	+3
(Germany) Xu Huaiwen	1	1	0	+1
(Hong Kong) / (China) Wang Chen	10	7	3	+4
(Japan) Yasuko Mizui	4	4	0	+4
(Indonesia) Susi Susanti	15	0	15	–15
(Indonesia) Maria Kristin Yulianti	1	1	0	+1
(Netherlands) / (Indonesia) Mia Audina	11	6	5	+1
(South Korea) Bang Soo-hyun	2	0	2	–2
(South Korea) Kim Ji-hyun	7	5	2	+3
(Sweden) Lim Xiaoqing	6	5	1	+4
