= Meiluawati =

Indonesian badminton player

Personal information
- Born: 25 May 1975 (age 51) Indonesia

Sport
- Country: Indonesia; United States
- Sport: Badminton
- Event: Women's singles

Women's singles
- BWF profile
Medal record
Women's badminton
Representing United States
Pan Am Championships
Gold medal – first place	2001 Lima	Women's singles
Gold medal – first place	2001 Lima	Mixed team
Representing Indonesia
Uber Cup
Gold medal – first place	1996 Hong Kong	Women's team
Silver medal – second place	1998 Hong Kong	Women's team
Asian Games
Bronze medal – third place	1998 Bangkok	Women's team
SEA Games
Gold medal – first place	1997 Jakarta	Women's team
Silver medal – second place	1997 Jakarta	Women's singles

Meiluawati (born 25 May 1975) is an Indonesian born former world-class badminton player who represented Indonesia and later the United States.

== Career ==
Meiluawati was a member of Indonesia's world champion 1996 Uber Cup (women's international) team, winning her final round match against China's future World and Olympic champion Zhang Ning. She was also a member of the 1998 Indonesian Uber Cup team which finished second to China. In individual competition she won the women's singles at the Polish Open in 1996 and was women's singles runner-up to the formidable Susi Susanti at the 1997 Indonesia Open.

Playing for the United States in the early 2000s, Meiluawati won consecutive U.S. National women's singles titles in 2001, 2002, and 2003; and women's doubles in 2001 and 2003. She also won women's singles at the Pan Am Championships in 2001.

== Achievements ==
=== Pan Am Championships ===
Women's singles
Year	Venue	Opponent	Score	Result
2001	Club de Regatas Lima; Lima, Peru	(United States) Cindy Shi	7–1, 7–2, 7–3	Gold

=== SEA Games ===
Women's singles
Year	Venue	Opponent	Score	Result
1997	Asia-Africa Hall; Jakarta, Indonesia	(Indonesia) Mia Audina	10–12, 11–12	Silver

=== World Junior Championships ===
The Bimantara World Junior Championships was an international invitation badminton tournament for junior players. It was held in Jakarta, Indonesia from 1987 to 1991.

Girls' singles
Year	Venue	Opponent	Score	Result
1991	Istora Senayan; Jakarta, Indonesia	(China) Yao Yan	11–0, 9–11, 7–11	Silver

=== IBF World Grand Prix ===
The World Badminton Grand Prix was sanctioned by the International Badminton Federation from 1983 to 2006.

Women's singles
Year	Tournament	Opponent	Score	Result
1994	Canadian Open	(Denmark) Pernille Nedergaard	6–11, 2–11	(silver) Runner-up
1996	Polish Open	(China) Wang Chen	11–6, 11–4	(gold) Winner
1997	Indonesia Open	(Indonesia) Susi Susanti	4–11, 5–11	(silver) Runner-up

=== IBF International ===
Women's singles
Year	Tournament	Opponent	Score	Result
2001	USA Southern Panam International	(Peru) Sandra Jimeno	7–2, 7–0, 7–0	(gold) Winner

Women's doubles
Year	Tournament	Partner	Opponent	Score	Result
2001	USA Southern Pan Am International	(United States) Mesinee Mangkalakiri	(Peru) Sandra Jimeno (Peru) Doriana Rivera	0–7, 7–3, 7–5	(gold) Winner
