= Kelly Morgan =

British badminton player (born 1975)

Kelly Aston MBE OLY
Personal information
- Born: Kelly Ann Morgan; 22 May 1975 (age 51) Pontypridd, Mid Glamorgan, Wales
- Height: 5 ft 10 in (178 cm)
- Weight: 65 kg (143 lb)

Sport
- Sport: Badminton
- Handedness: Right
Medal record
Women's badminton
Representing Wales
Commonwealth Games
Gold medal – first place	1998 Kuala Lumpur	Women's singles
European Championships
Silver medal – second place	1998 Sofia	Women's singles
Bronze medal – third place	2000 Glasgow	Women's singles

Kelly Ann Aston (née Morgan, born 22 May 1975) is a Welsh badminton player. She has represented Wales and Great Britain in regional and international competitions, including the Olympics and the Commonwealth Games, winning gold in the 1998 Commonwealth Games, and beat world number one Ye Zhaoying of China in the 1999 IBF World Championships.

== Career ==
Aston began playing badminton at age nine. Her brother, Ross, was initially trying for the Welsh national team, and she only made the team as a result of accompanying him to the trials.

Morgan won the 1998 Rhondda Cynon Taff Sports Personality of the Year and in 1999, Aston was voted Welsh Woman of the Year; she was appointed a Member of the Order of the British Empire (MBE) in the 2002 Birthday Honours for "services to the community, especially through Sport, in South Wales."

Aston won 13 consecutive Women's Singles titles at the Welsh National Badminton Championships between 1992 and 2004, as well as six Women's Doubles and 4 Mixed Doubles titles. In 1998, she received a gold medal representing Wales at the Commonwealth Games, won silver at the 1998 European Badminton Championships, and bronze at the 2000 European Badminton Championships. She also represented Great Britain at the 1996, 2000 and 2004 Olympic Games.

== Personal life ==
Aston was born in Pontypridd and attended Bryn Celynnog Comprehensive School. She married her husband, Dylan Aston, in 2002, and has two children, Ethan and Ella. As of December 2015 is a teacher at the GEMS Wellington Academy-Al Khail in Dubai. She has also been heavily involved in charity work, particularly relating to Down syndrome, and was the patron of the Down's Syndrome Association of Wales.

== Achievements ==
=== Commonwealth Games ===
Women’s singles
Year	Venue	Opponent	Score	Result
1998	Kuala Lumpur Badminton Stadium; Kuala Lumpur, Malaysia	(India) Aparna Popat	13–10, 11–5	Gold

=== European Championships ===
Women's singles
Year	Venue	Opponent	Score	Result
2000	Kelvin Hall International Sports Arena; Glasgow, Scotland	(Denmark) Camilla Martin	11–4, 6–11, 1–11	Bronze
1998	Winter Sports Palace; Sofia, Bulgaria	(Denmark) Camilla Martin	2–11, 4–11	Silver

=== IBF World Grand Prix ===
The World Badminton Grand Prix has been sanctioned by the International Badminton Federation since 1983.

Women's singles
Year	Tournament	Opponent	Score	Result
1997	Dutch Open	(Netherlands) Judith Meulendijks	9–11, 11–6, 8–11	(silver) Runner-up
2003	US Open	(South Korea) Lee Eun-woo	13–10, 7–11, 11–5	(gold) Winner

Women's doubles
Year	Tournament	Partner	Opponent	Score	Result
1996	Polish Open	(England) Joanne Muggeridge	(Sweden) Christine Gandrup (Sweden) Marina Andrievskaya	10–15, 8–15	(silver) Runner-up
1997	Dutch Open	(Denmark) Pernille Harder	(Netherlands) Erica van den Heuvel (Netherlands) Monique Hoogland	15–9, 15–9	(gold) Winner

=== IBF International ===
Women's singles
Year	Tournament	Opponent	Score	Result
2003	Irish International	(Denmark) Tine Rasmussen	9–11, 5–11	(silver) Runner-up
2003	Southern PanAm Classic	(Japan) Kanako Yonekura	2–11, 3–11	(silver) Runner-up
2003	Brazil International	(Japan) Miho Tanaka	8–11, 2–11	(silver) Runner-up
2003	Peru International	(Spain) Dolores Marco	11–9, 11–5	(gold) Winner
2003	Croatian International	(France) Pi Hongyan	11–6, 5–11, 4–11	(silver) Runner-up
2003	Polish International	(Germany) Xu Huaiwen	5–11, 11–9, 3–11	(silver) Runner-up
2002	Mexico International	(Peru) Sandra Jimeno	11–1, 11–2	(gold) Winner
2001	Scottish International	(Denmark) Christina Sørensen	8–6, 7–2, 5–7, 6–8, 5–7	(silver) Runner-up
1997	French International	(Sweden) Karolina Ericsson	12–9, 11–3	(gold) Winner
1996	Welsh International	(Sweden) Karolina Ericsson	11–4, 11–4	(gold) Winner
1996	Norwegian International	(Sweden) Marina Andrievskaya	9–5, 9–0, 4–9, 9–8	(gold) Winner
1996	Finnish International	(England) Joanne Muggeridge	10–12, 5–11	(silver) Runner-up

Women's doubles
Year	Tournament	Partner	Opponent	Score	Result
1996	Welsh International	(England) Sarah Hardaker	(Netherlands) Brenda Conjin (Netherlands) Nicole van Hooren	15–6, 10–15, 4–15	(silver) Runner-up
1996	Finnish International	(England) Joanne Muggeridge	(England) Nichola Beck (England) Joanne Davies	15–3, 15–10	(gold) Winner
1995	Portugal International	(England) Sarah Hore	(Denmark) Mette Hansen (Denmark) Majken Vange	6–15, 17–14, 12–15	(silver) Runner-up
1994	Hungarian International	(Denmark) Anne Søndergaard	(England) Sarah Hardaker (England) Rebecca Pantaney	8–15, 11–15	(silver) Runner-up

Mixed doubles
Year	Tournament	Partner	Opponent	Score	Result
2004	Welsh International	(Wales) Matthew Hughes	(England) Chris Langridge (England) Caroline Westley	17–14, 8–15, 15–7	(gold) Winner
