= Margit Borg =

Swedish badminton player (born 1969)

Personal information
- Born: 15 June 1969 (age 57) Mariestad, Sweden
- Height: 169 cm (5 ft 7 in)

Sport
- Country: Sweden
- Sport: Badminton
- Handedness: Right
- Event: Women's singles & doubles
Medal record
Women's badminton
Representing Sweden
Uber Cup
Bronze medal – third place	1992 Kuala Lumpur	Women's team
European Junior Championships
Gold medal – first place	1987 Warsaw	Girls' doubles
Silver medal – second place	1987 Warsaw	Girls' singles
Bronze medal – third place	1987 Warsaw	Mixed team

Margit Borg (born 15 June 1969) is a Swedish badminton player, born in Mariestad. She competed in women's singles and women's doubles at the 1996 Summer Olympics in Atlanta.

== Career ==
Margit Borg competed in the women's singles and doubles at the 1996 Olympics, finishing 9th in singles and 17th in doubles with partner Maria Bengtsson. The year before, she had already won the French Open. In 2000, she became the German team champion with BC Eintracht Südring Berlin as a foreign player.

== Achievements ==
=== European Junior Championships ===
Girls' doubles
Year	Venue	Partner	Opponent	Score	Result
1987	Hali Mery; Warsaw, Poland	(Sweden) Catrine Bengtsson	(England) Julie Munday (England) Tracy Dineen	15–4, 17–14	Gold

Mixed doubles
Year	Venue	Partner	Opponent	Score	Result
1987	Hali Mery; Warsaw, Poland	(Sweden) Jonas Ericsson	(Denmark) Jens Maibom (Denmark) Charlotte Madsen	15–4, 10–15, 14–18	Silver

=== IBF World Grand Prix ===
The World Badminton Grand Prix was sanctioned by the International Badminton Federation from 1983 to 2006.

Women's doubles
Year	Tournament	Opponent	Score	Result
1996	German Open	(China) Yao Jie	1–11, 0–11	(silver) Runner-up

Women's doubles
Year	Tournament	Partner	Opponent	Score	Result
1995	French Open	(Sweden) Maria Bengtsson	(Russia) Elena Rybkina (Russia) Marina Yakusheva	15–10, 15–6	(gold) Winner
1996	Dutch Open	(Sweden) Christine Magnusson	(Netherlands) Eline Coene (Netherlands) Erica van Dijck	5–9, 1–9, 9–5, 2–9	(silver) Runner-up

=== IBF International ===
Women's singles
Year	Tournament	Opponent	Score	Result
1993	Uppsala International	(Denmark) Lotte Thomsen	11–2, 11–5	(gold) Winner
1994	Polish Open	(Sweden) Lotta Andersson	4–11, 11–5, 11–2	(gold) Winner
1994	Austrian Open	(Chinese Taipei) Chen Hsiao-li	11–7, 11–2	(gold) Winner
1994	Norwegian International	(Sweden) Astrid Crabo	3–11, 11–5, 11–7	(gold) Winner
1994	Irish Open	(Sweden) Karolina Ericsson	11–4, 11–8	(gold) Winner
1995	La Chaux-de-Fonds International	(Sweden) Marina Andrievskaya	11–8, 11–7	(gold) Winner
1995	Victor Cup	(Chinese Taipei) Huang Chia-chi	12–10, 11–8	(gold) Winner
1996	Malmo International	(Sweden) Marina Andrievskaya	11–6, 12–11	(gold) Winner
1998	Scottish Open	(Finland) Anu Nieminen	11–5, 11–3	(gold) Winner

Women's doubles
Year	Tournament	Partner	Opponent	Score	Result
1989	USSR International	(Sweden) Astrid Crabo	(Soviet Union) Svetlana Belyasova (Soviet Union) Irina Serova	14–17, 5–15	(silver) Runner-up
1990	Stockholm International	(Sweden) Maria Bengtsson	(Sweden) Emma Edbom (Sweden) Ulrika Gideonsson	15–6, 15–5	(gold) Winner
1992	Uppsala International	(Sweden) Charlotta Wihlborg	(Denmark) Marianne Rasmussen (Denmark) Anne-Mette van Dijk	0–15, 7–15	(silver) Runner-up
1994	La Chaux-de-Fonds International	(Sweden) Lotta Andersson	(Germany) Nicole Baldewin (Germany) Karen Stechmann	15–12, 15–3	(gold) Winner
1994	Norwegian International	(Sweden) Maria Bengtsson	(Sweden) Karolina Ericsson (Sweden) Ulrika Persson	15–0, 15–3	(gold) Winner
1994	Irish Open	(Sweden) Maria Bengtsson	(Denmark) Helene Kirkegaard (Denmark) Rikke Olsen	11–15, 12–15	(silver) Runner-up
1995	La Chaux-de-Fonds International	(Sweden) Maria Bengtsson	(Germany) Heidi Dössing (Germany) Karen Neumann	8–15, 15–12, 15–2	(gold) Winner
1995	Malmo International	(Sweden) Maria Bengtsson	(Denmark) Michelle Rasmussen (Denmark) Mette Sørensen	15–9, 15–8	(gold) Winner
1996	Malmo International	(Sweden) Maria Bengtsson	(Denmark) Pernille Harder (Denmark) Ann-Lou Jørgensen	15–4, 15–7	(gold) Winner
