= Gong Zhichao =

Chinese badminton player (born 1977)

Gong Zhichao 龚智超
Personal information
- Born: 15 December 1977 (age 48) Anhua, Hunan, China
- Height: 1.63 m (5 ft 4 in)
- Weight: 53 kg (117 lb)

Sport
- Country: China
- Sport: Badminton
- Coached by: Li Lingwei

Women's singles
- Highest ranking: 1
- BWF profile
Medal record
Women's badminton
Representing China
Olympic Games
| Gold medal – first place | 2000 Sydney | Women's singles |
World Championships
| Silver medal – second place | 1997 Glasgow | Women's singles |
| Bronze medal – third place | 2001 Seville | Women's singles |
World Cup
| Bronze medal – third place | 1997 Yogyakarta | Women's singles |
Sudirman Cup
| Gold medal – first place | 2001 Seville | Mixed team |
| Gold medal – first place | 1999 Copenhagen | Mixed team |
| Gold medal – first place | 1997 Glasgow | Mixed team |
Uber Cup
| Gold medal – first place | 2000 Kuala Lumpur | Women's team |
| Gold medal – first place | 1998 Hong Kong | Women's team |
Asian Games
| Gold medal – first place | 1998 Bangkok | Women's team |
| Silver medal – second place | 1998 Bangkok | Women's singles |
Asian Championships
| Gold medal – first place | 1996 Surabaya | Women's singles |
| Silver medal – second place | 1998 Bangkok | Women's singles |
| Bronze medal – third place | 1999 Kuala Lumpur | Women's singles |

Gong Zhichao (simplified Chinese: 龚智超; traditional Chinese: 龔智超; pinyin: Gōng Zhìchāo; born 15 December 1977) is a former badminton player from the People's Republic of China.

== Career ==
Gong was one of the world's leading women's singles players between her first international titles in 1996 and her retirement in 2002. She won some of the world's biggest tournaments, including the venerable All-England Championship consecutively in 2000 and 2001 over fellow countrywomen Dai Yun and Zhou Mi respectively in the finals. Her other titles included the 1996 Asian Championships, the 2000 Copenhagen Masters; and the Denmark (1996), Swedish (1997), China (1997), Japan (1998, 2000), and Malaysia (2000) Opens. At the then biennial IBF (BWF) World Championships Gong was a silver medalist behind fellow countrywoman Ye Zhaoying in 1997, and a bronze medalist in 2001. She played winning singles for Chinese Uber Cup (women's international) teams that reclaimed the world team title from Indonesia in 1998, and retained the title in 2000.

Unfortunately for Gong, her biggest triumph in an event for individual players, women's singles at the 2000 Olympic Games, is tainted by controversy. According to his later statement, China's head badminton coach Li Yongbo instructed Gong's semifinal opponent, teammate Ye Zhaoying, to "throw" the match against her, on his assumption that Gong would have the better chance to defeat Denmark's Camilla Martin in the final. Whatever the effect of these "instructions" on Ye, a two time former IBF World Champion, she lost the match to Gong 8–11, 8–11, who in turn defeated reigning IBF World Champion Martin for the gold medal 13–10, 11–3.

== Achievements ==
=== Olympic Games ===
Women's singles
| Year | Venue | Opponent | Score | Result |
|---|---|---|---|---|
| 2000 | The Dome; Sydney, Australia | (Denmark) Camilla Martin | 13–10, 11–3 | Gold |

=== World Championships ===
Women's singles
| Year | Venue | Opponent | Score | Result |
|---|---|---|---|---|
| 2001 | Palacio de Deportes de San Pablo; Seville, Spain | (China) Gong Ruina | 10–13, 4–11 | Bronze |
| 1997 | Scotstoun Centre; Glasgow, Scotland | (China) Ye Zhaoying | 11–12, 8–11 | Silver |

=== World Cup ===
Women's singles
| Year | Venue | Opponent | Score | Result |
|---|---|---|---|---|
| 1997 | Yogyakarta, Indonesia | (Indonesia) Susi Susanti | 10–13, 9–11 | Bronze |

=== Asian Games ===
Women's singles
| Year | Venue | Opponent | Score | Result |
|---|---|---|---|---|
| 1998 | Thammasat Gymnasium 2 Bangkok, Thailand | (Japan) Kanako Yonekura | 11–1, 5–11, 6–11 | Silver |

=== Asian Championships ===
Women's singles
| Year | Venue | Opponent | Score | Result |
|---|---|---|---|---|
| 1999 | Kuala Lumpur, Malaysia | (China) Ye Zhaoying | 2–11, 4–11 | Bronze |
| 1998 | Bangkok, Thailand | (China) Ye Zhaoying | 5–11, 12–11 | Silver |
| 1996 | Surabaya, Indonesia | (South Korea) Lee Joo-hyun | 11–7, 11–1 | Gold |

=== IBF World Grand Prix ===
The World Badminton Grand Prix sanctioned by International Badminton Federation (IBF) since 1983.

Women's singles
| Year | Tournament | Opponent | Score | Result |
|---|---|---|---|---|
| 2001 | All England Open | (China) Zhou Mi | 11–7, 11–3 | (gold) Winner |
| 2000 | Grand Prix Finals | (China) Zhou Mi | 5–7, 7–5, 1–7, 0–7 | (silver) Runner-up |
| 2000 | Malaysia Open | (China) Dai Yun | 11–6, 11–8 | (gold) Winner |
| 2000 | Japan Open | (China) Ye Zhaoying | 11–7, 11–3 | (gold) Winner |
| 2000 | All England Open | (China) Dai Yun | 11–5, 8–11, 11–5 | (gold) Winner |
| 1999 | Singapore Open | (China) Ye Zhaoying | 5–11, 11–5, 7–11 | (silver) Runner-up |
| 1999 | Japan Open | (China) Ye Zhaoying | 11–1, 5–11, 6–11 | (silver) Runner-up |
| 1998 | Swedish Open | (South Korea) Kim Ji-hyun | 10–12, 8–11 | (silver) Runner-up |
| 1998 | Japan Open | (China) Ye Zhaoying | 11–1, 11–4 | (gold) Winner |
| 1997 | China Open | (China) Dai Yun | 11–1, 11–5 | (gold) Winner |
| 1997 | Singapore Open | (Indonesia) Mia Audina | 6–11, 6–11 | (silver) Runner-up |
| 1997 | All England Open | (China) Ye Zhaoying | 3–11, 1–11 | (silver) Runner-up |
| 1997 | Swedish Open | (South Korea) Ra Kyung-min | 11–4, 11–4 | (gold) Winner |
| 1997 | Korea Open | (China) Ye Zhaoying | 11–6, 10–12, 4–11 | (silver) Runner-up |
| 1997 | Japan Open | (Indonesia) Mia Audina | 3–11, 11–2, 5–11 | (silver) Runner-up |
| 1996 | Denmark Open | (Sweden) Marina Andrievskaya | 12–11, 11–4 | (gold) Winner |
| 1996 | Russian Open | (China) Han Jingna | 7–11, 5–11 | (silver) Runner-up |
