= Mette Sørensen =

Danish badminton player

Personal information
- Born: 28 May 1975 (age 51) Northern Jutland, Denmark
- Height: 167 cm (5 ft 6 in)

Sport
- Country: Denmark
- Sport: Badminton
- Handedness: Right
- BWF profile
Medal record
Women's badminton
Representing Denmark
World Championships
Bronze medal – third place	1999 Copenhagen	Women's singles
Sudirman Cup
Bronze medal – third place	2001 Seville	Mixed team
Bronze medal – third place	1997 Glasgow	Mixed team
Uber Cup
Silver medal – second place	2000 Kualalumpur	Women's team
Bronze medal – third place	1998 Hongkong	Women's team
European Championships
Bronze medal – third place	2000 Glasgow	Women's singles
Bronze medal – third place	1998 Sofia	Women's singles
European Mixed Team Championships
Gold medal – first place	2000 Glasgow	Mixed team
Gold medal – first place	1998 Sofia	Mixed team
European Junior Championships
Gold medal – first place	1993 Sofia	Girls' doubles
Gold medal – first place	1993 Sofia	Mixed team
Gold medal – first place	1993 Sofia	Girls' singles

Mette Sørensen (born 28 May 1975) is a retired female Danish badminton player. While competing in 2000 Olympics, she lost in the third round to 4th seeded Ye Zhaoying of China. She married Dutch born Danish badminton player Quinten van Dalm Their daughter Kasja van Dalm is now playing international for Denmark.

== Achievements ==
=== World Championships ===
Women's singles
Year	Venue	Opponent	Score	Result
1999	Brøndby Arena; Copenhagen, Denmark	(China) Dai Yun	8–11, 12–13	Bronze

=== European Championships ===
Women's singles
Year	Venue	Opponent	Score	Result
1998	Winter Sports Palace; Sofia, Bulgaria	(Denmark) Camilla Martin	7–11, 11–12	Bronze
2000	Kelvin Hall International Sports Arena; Glasgow, Scotland	(Sweden) Marina Andrievskaya	7–11, 4–11	Bronze

=== European Junior Championships ===
Girls' singles
Year	Venue	Opponent	Score	Result
1993	Hristo Botev Hall; Sofia, Bulgaria	(Russia) Marina Andrievskaya	11–7, 11–3	Gold

Girls' doubles
Year	Venue	Partner	Opponent	Score	Result
1993	Hristo Botev Hall; Sofia, Bulgaria	(Denmark) Rikke Olsen	(Denmark) Lone Sørensen (Denmark) Sara Runesten	15–10, 15–5	Gold

=== IBF World Grand Prix ===
The World Badminton Grand Prix has been sanctioned by the International Badminton Federation from 1983 to 2006.

Women's singles
Year	Tournament	Opponent	Score	Result
1996	Hamburg Cup	(Denmark) Anne Søndergaard	11–6, 3–11, 5–11	(silver) Runner-up
1997	Russian Open	(Denmark) Mette Pedersen	3–11, 2–11	(silver) Runner-up
1998	Indonesia Open	(Indonesia) Mia Audina	0–11, 6–11	(silver) Runner-up
2001	U.S. Open	(South Korea) Ra Kyung-min	8–6, 4–7, 3–7	(silver) Runner-up

Women's doubles

Year	Tournament	Partner	Opponent	Score	Result
1999	Swiss Open	(Denmark) Rikke Olsen	(Denmark) Ann Jørgensen (Denmark) Majken Vange	15–2, 15–0	(gold) Winner

=== IBF International ===
Women's singles
Year	Tournament	Opponent	Score	Result
1993	Czech International	(Russia) Irina Yakusheva	8–11, 11–7, 11–0	(gold) Winner
1994	Czech International	(Austria) Irina Serova	8–11, 1–11	(silver) Runner-up
1995	Malmö International	(Denmark) Michelle Rasmussen	11–4, 11–3	(gold) Winner
1995	Czech International	(Russia) Elena Rybkina	12–10, 7–11, 4–11	(silver) Runner-up

Women's doubles
Year	Tournament	Partner	Opponent	Score	Result
1994	Polish International	(Denmark) Lone Sørensen	(Indonesia) Eny Oktavianti (Indonesia) Nonong Denis Zanati	15–11, 15–8	(gold) Winner
1994	Czech International	(Denmark) Lone Sørensen	(Bulgaria) Neli Boteva (Bulgaria) Diana Koleva	17–14, 15–11	(gold) Winner
1995	Malmö International	(Denmark) Michelle Rasmussen	(Sweden) Maria Bengtsson (Sweden) Margit Borg	9–15, 8–15	(silver) Runner-up
