= Miho Tanaka (badminton) =

Japanese badminton player

Personal information
- Born: April 8, 1976 (age 50) Saga, Japan
- Height: 1.63 m (5 ft 4 in)
- Weight: 57 kg (126 lb; 9.0 st)

Sport
- Country: Japan
- Sport: Badminton
- Event: Women's singles

Miho Tanaka (田中 美保, Tanaka Miho; born April 8, 1976 in Saga, Japan) is a female badminton player from Japan.

Tanaka played badminton at the 2004 Summer Olympics, losing to Salakjit Ponsana of Thailand in the round of 32.

== Achievements ==
=== IBF International ===
Women's singles
Year	Tournament	Opponent	Score	Result	Ref.
1999	Irish Open	(Finland) Anu Weckström	11–9, 11–5	(gold) Winner	
2003	Western Australia International	(Japan) Kaori Mori	11–8, 13–10	(gold) Winner	
2003	Brazil International	(Wales) Kelly Morgan	11–8, 11–2	(gold) Winner	
2003	Guatemala International	(Canada) Charmaine Reid	11–5, 11–3	(gold) Winner	
2004	Peru International	(Canada) Charmaine Reid	11–1, 11–3	(gold) Winner	
