= Chan Ya-lin =

Taiwanese badminton player

Chan Ya-lin 詹雅玲
Personal information
- Born: 5 March 1976 (age 50)
- Height: 1.54 m (5 ft 1 in)
- Weight: 52 kg (115 lb)

Sport
- Country: Republic of China (Taiwan)
- Sport: Badminton
- Handedness: Left
- Event: Women's singles & doubles

Women's singles & doubles
- BWF profile

Chan Ya-lin (Chinese: 詹雅玲; pinyin: Chān Yǎlíng; Wade–Giles: Chan Ya-ling; born 5 March 1976) is a former Taiwanese badminton player. She competed at the 2000 Summer Olympics in the women's singles event, but was defeated in the third round to Mia Audina of the Netherlands. Chan was the semifinalists at the 1997 Vietnam Open and 1998 Hong Kong Open. She also represented Chinese Taipei at the 1998 Asian Games.

== Achievements ==
=== IBF International ===
Women's singles

Year	Tournament	Opponent	Score	Result
1997	Chinese Taipei International	(Japan) Kanako Yonekura	11–4, 11–8	(gold) Winner
