= Mia Audina =

Indonesia-born Dutch badminton player

Personal information
- Born: Mia Audina Tjiptawan; 22 August 1979 (age 47) Jakarta, Indonesia
- Height: 1.63 m (5 ft 4 in)
- Weight: 67 kg (148 lb)

Sport
- Country: Indonesia (1994–2000); Netherlands (2000–2006)
- Sport: Badminton
- Handedness: Right

Women's singles
- Highest ranking: 1 (1996)
- BWF profile
Medal record
Women's badminton
Representing Netherlands
Olympic Games
Silver medal – second place	2004 Athens	Women's singles
World Championships
Bronze medal – third place	2003 Birmingham	Women's singles
Uber Cup
Silver medal – second place	2006 Tokyo	Women's team
Bronze medal – third place	2002 Guangzhou	Women's team
European Championships
Gold medal – first place	2004 Geneva	Women's singles
Gold medal – first place	2004 Geneva	Women's doubles
Silver medal – second place	2002 Malmö	Women's singles
Silver medal – second place	2006 Den Bosch	Women's singles
European Mixed Team Championships
Silver medal – second place	2004 Geneva	Mixed team
Silver medal – second place	2006 Den Bosch	Mixed team
Bronze medal – third place	2002 Malmö	Mixed team
European Women's Team Championships
Gold medal – first place	2006 Thessalonica	Women's team
Representing Indonesia
Olympic Games
Silver medal – second place	1996 Atlanta	Women's singles
World Cup
Bronze medal – third place	1995 Jakarta	Women's singles
Bronze medal – third place	1996 Jakarta	Women's singles
Bronze medal – third place	1997 Yogyakarta	Women's singles
Uber Cup
Gold medal – first place	1994 Jakarta	Women's team
Gold medal – first place	1996 Hong Kong	Women's team
Silver medal – second place	1998 Hong Kong	Women's team
Sudirman Cup
Silver medal – second place	1995 Lausanne	Mixed team
Bronze medal – third place	1997 Glasgow	Mixed team
Asian Games
Bronze medal – third place	1998 Bangkok	Women's team
Asian Cup
Silver medal – second place	1995 Qingdao	Women's singles
SEA Games
Gold medal – first place	1997 Jakarta	Women's singles
Gold medal – first place	1997 Jakarta	Women's team
World Junior Championships
Bronze medal – third place	1992 Jakarta	Girls' singles
Bronze medal – third place	1992 Jakarta	Girls' doubles

Mia Audina Tjiptawan (born 22 August 1979) is a former Indonesian badminton player who represented Indonesia and later the Netherlands in international competitions. A badminton prodigy, Audina first played Uber Cup (the women's world team championship) for Indonesia at age fourteen, winning the decisive final match in the championship round against China in 1994. She was briefly ranked as the World No.1 women's singles player in October 1996. Audina helped Indonesia to retain the Uber Cup title in 1996, and was a member of the 1998 Indonesian team which relinquished the Cup to China, before moving to the Netherlands with her Dutch-national husband in 2000.

== Career ==
As a Dutch resident she continued to compete, winning titles in both Europe and Asia before retiring from high-level competition in 2006. Top honors in badminton's three most prestigious events for individual players, the Olympics, the All-Englands, and the World Championships, eluded Audina, though she was twice an Olympic silver medalist in singles (1996, 2004) and was a bronze medalist at the World Championships in 2003. Her most significant victories included the open singles titles of the USA (1996), Singapore (1997), Japan (1997, 2004), Indonesia (1998), Korea (2003), the Netherlands (2001, 2002), Switzerland (2002), and Taiwan (2000, 2003). She won singles at the SEA Games in 1997 and both singles and women's doubles at the European Championships in 2004. A gritty competitor and, in her youth, exceptionally mobile and supple (she was rarely forced into hitting backhands), Audina was a crowd favorite throughout her career.

== Achievements ==
=== Olympic Games ===
Women's singles
Year	Venue	Opponent	Score	Result
1996	Georgia State University Gymnasium, Atlanta, United States	(South Korea) Bang Soo-hyun	6–11, 7–11	Silver
2004	Goudi Olympic Hall, Athens, Greece	(China) Zhang Ning	11–8, 6–11, 7–11	Silver

=== World Championships ===
Women's singles
Year	Venue	Opponent	Score	Result
2003	National Indoor Arena, Birmingham, England	(China) Zhang Ning	7–11, 0–11	Bronze

=== World Cup ===
Women's singles
Year	Venue	Opponent	Score	Result
1995	Istora Senayan, Jakarta, Indonesia	(China) Ye Zhaoying	6–11, 11–4, 7–11	Bronze
1996	Istora Senayan, Jakarta, Indonesia	(China) Wang Chen	9–11, 11–3, 7–11	Bronze
1997	Among Rogo Sports Hall, Yogyakarta, Indonesia	(China) Ye Zhaoying	4–11, 11–5, 5–11	Bronze

=== European Championships ===
Women's singles
Year	Venue	Opponent	Score	Result
2002	Baltiska hallen, Malmö, Sweden	(Netherlands) Yao Jie	6–8, 3–7, 1–7	Silver
2004	Queue d’Arve Sport Center, Geneva, Switzerland	(France) Pi Hongyan	11–1, 11–0	Gold
2006	Maaspoort Sports and Events, Den Bosch, Netherlands	(Germany) Xu Huaiwen	21–15, 9–21, 16–21	Silver

Women's doubles
Year	Venue	Partner	Opponent	Score	Result
2004	Queue d’Arve Sport Center, Geneva, Switzerland	(Netherlands) Lotte Bruil-Jonathans	(Denmark) Ann-Lou Jørgensen (Denmark) Rikke Olsen	15–10, 15–1	Gold

=== Asian Cup ===
Women's singles
Year	Venue	Opponent	Score	Result
1995	Xinxing Gymnasium, Qingdao, China	(South Korea) Bang Soo-hyun	11–1, 2–11, 12–13	Silver

=== SEA Games ===
Women's singles
Year	Venue	Opponent	Score	Result
1997	Asia-Africa Hall, Jakarta, Indonesia	(Indonesia) Meiluawati	12–10, 12–11	Gold

=== World Junior Championships ===
Girls' singles
Year	Venue	Opponent	Score	Result
1992	Istora Senayan, Jakarta, Indonesia	(Indonesia) Kristin Yunita	9–11, 5–11	Bronze

Girls' doubles
Year	Venue	Partner	Opponent	Score	Result
1992	Istora Senayan, Jakarta, Indonesia	(Indonesia) Indarti Issolina	(China) Tang Yongshu (China) Yuan Yali	6–15, 9–15	Bronze

=== IBF World Grand Prix ===
The World Badminton Grand Prix has been sanctioned by the International Badminton Federation from 1983 to 2006.

Women's singles
Year	Tournament	Opponent	Score	Result
1995	German Open	(Denmark) Camilla Martin	6–11, 6–11	(silver) Runner-up
1995	Hong Kong Open	(South Korea) Bang Soo-hyun	11–5, 4–11, 5–11	(silver) Runner-up
1996	U.S. Open	(Denmark) Camilla Martin	11–5, 12–9	(gold) Winner
1996	Hong Kong Open	(Denmark) Camilla Martin	8–11, 6–11	(silver) Runner-up
1997	Chinese Taipei Open	(Denmark) Camilla Martin	10–12, 2–11	(silver) Runner-up
1997	Japan Open	(China) Gong Zhichao	11–3, 2–11, 11–5	(gold) Winner
1997	Singapore Open	(China) Gong Zhichao	11–6, 11–6	(gold) Winner
1998	Indonesia Open	(Denmark) Mette Sørensen	11–0, 11–6	(gold) Winner
1999	Dutch Open	(China) Tang Chunyu	13–11, 4–11, 7–11	(silver) Runner-up
2000	Chinese Taipei Open	(Thailand) Sujitra Ekmongkolpaisarn	13–11, 11–2	(gold) Winner
2001	Dutch Open	(Netherlands) Yao Jie	7–5, 1–7, 7–5, 7–5	(gold) Winner
2002	Swiss Open	(China) Zeng Yaqiong	7–1, 7–3, 7–2	(gold) Winner
2002	Dutch Open	(Sweden) Marina Andrievskaya	11–8, 11–2	(gold) Winner
2003	Korea Open	(Hong Kong) Wang Chen	11–3, 10–13, 11–0	(gold) Winner
2003	Chinese Taipei Open	(France) Pi Hongyan	10–13, 11–2, 11–3	(gold) Winner
2004	Swiss Open	(China) Gong Ruina	11–13, 0–11	(silver) Runner-up
2004	Japan Open	(China) Gong Ruina	7–11, 11–7, 11–7	(gold) Winner
2005	Indonesia Open	(Hong Kong) Wang Chen	7–11, 1–11	(silver) Runner-up
2006	Singapore Open	(France) Pi Hongyan	20–22, 20–22	(silver) Runner-up

Women's doubles
Year	Tournament	Partner	Opponent	Score	Result
2002	Denmark Open	(Netherlands) Lotte Jonathans	(China) Wei Yili (China) Zhao Tingting	3–11, 11–6, 9–11	(silver) Runner-up
2002	German Open	(Netherlands) Lotte Jonathans	(Denmark) Ann-Lou Jørgensen (Denmark) Rikke Olsen	11–2, 11–2	(gold) Winner
2005	Dutch Open	(Netherlands) Lotte Bruil-Jonathans	(Malaysia) Chin Eei Hui (Malaysia) Wong Pei Tty	15–9, 15–10	(gold) Winner

=== IBF International ===
Women's singles
Year	Tournament	Opponent	Score	Result
2001	Dutch International	(Netherlands) Yao Jie	11–9, 1–11, 10–13	(silver) Runner-up
2005	Strasbourg Masters	(France) Pi Hongyan	11–3, 11–5	(gold) Winner

Women's doubles
Year	Tournament	Partner	Opponent	Score	Result
2002	BMW International	(Netherlands) Lotte Jonathans	(Denmark) Ann-Lou Jørgensen (Denmark) Rikke Olsen	5–11, 11–5, 11–8	(gold) Winner

=== IBF Junior International ===
Girls' singles
Year	Tournament	Opponent	Score	Result	Ref.
1993	Dutch Junior	(Indonesia) Ita Ardwiantini	5–11, 11–4, 11–6	(gold) Winner	
1993	German Junior	(Indonesia) Ita Ardwiantini		(gold) Winner	

== Record against selected opponents ==
Record against year-end Finals finalists, World Championships semi-finalists, and Olympic quarter-finalists.

Players	Matches	Results		Difference
Players	Matches	Won	Lost	Difference
(Bulgaria) Petya Nedelcheva	1	1	0	+1
(China) Dai Yun	4	0	4	–4
(China) Gong Ruina	8	3	5	–2
(China) Gong Zhichao	4	2	2	0
(China) Han Jingna	1	0	1	–1
(China) Lu Lan	3	1	2	–1
(China) Wang Lin	1	0	1	–1
(China) Xie Xingfang	6	0	6	–6
(China) Yao Yan	2	2	0	+2
(China) Ye Zhaoying	8	3	5	–2
(China) Zhang Ning	13	6	7	–1
(China) Zhou Mi	11	5	6	–1
(China) Zhu Lin	1	1	0	+1
(Chinese Taipei) Cheng Shao-chieh	2	2	0	+2
(Chinese Taipei) Huang Chia-chi	2	2	0	+2
(Denmark) Tine Baun	2	2	0	+2
(Denmark) Camilla Martin	11	5	6	–1

Players	Matches	Results		Difference
Players	Matches	Won	Lost	Difference
(Denmark) Mette Sørensen	5	5	0	+5
(England) Tracey Hallam	6	5	1	+4
(France) / (China) Pi Hongyan	12	7	5	+2
(Germany) Petra Overzier	5	5	0	+5
(Germany) Juliane Schenk	3	3	0	+3
(Germany) / (China) Xu Huaiwen	8	5	3	+2
(Hong Kong) / (China) Wang Chen	10	5	5	0
(Hong Kong) Yip Pui Yin	1	1	0	+1
(Indonesia) Maria Kristin Yulianti	1	1	0	+1
(Indonesia) Susi Susanti	1	0	1	–1
(Japan) Yasuko Mizui	3	3	0	+3
(Malaysia) Wong Mew Choo	2	2	0	+2
(South Korea) Bang Soo-hyun	6	0	6	–6
(South Korea) Kim Ji-hyun	7	2	5	–3
(Sweden) Lim Xiaoqing	4	1	3	–2
(Thailand) Somharuthai Jaroensiri	3	3	0	+3
