= Marina Andrievskaya =

Soviet Swedish badminton player (born 1974)

Personal information
- Born: Marina Vladimirovna Andrievskaya; 20 November 1974 (age 51) Moscow, USSR
- Height: 1.82 m (6 ft 0 in)
- Weight: 66 kg (146 lb)

Sport
- Country: Russia; Sweden
- Sport: Badminton
- Handedness: Right
- Event: Women's singles

Women's singles
- BWF profile
Medal record
Women's badminton
Representing Sweden
European Championships
Silver medal – second place	2000 Glasgow	Women's singles
Representing Russia
European Junior Championships
Silver medal – second place	1993 Sofia	Girls' singles
Bronze medal – third place	1993 Sofia	Mixed team

Marina Vladimirovna Andrievskaya (Russian: Марина Владимировна Андриевская; born 20 November 1974) is a former Soviet badminton player, and later represented Sweden.

She won the silver medal at the 2000 European Badminton Championships.

Andrievskaya played badminton at the 2004 Summer Olympics, losing to Zhang Ning of China in the round of 32.

== Achievements ==
=== European Championships ===
Women's singles
Year	Venue	Opponent	Score	Result
2000	Kelvin Hall; Glasgow, Scotland	(Denmark) Camilla Martin	10–13, 3–11	Silver

=== IBF World Grand Prix ===
The World Badminton Grand Prix was sanctioned by the International Badminton Federation from 1983 to 2006.

Women's singles
Year	Tournament	Opponent	Score	Result
1993	Russian Open	(Russia) Marina Yakusheva	11–1, 11–4	(gold) Winner
1996	Denmark Open	(China) Gong Zhichao	11–12, 4–11	(silver) Runner-up
1997	German Open	(Denmark) Camilla Martin	7–11, 2–11	(silver) Runner-up
1999	German Open	(China) Tang Chunyu	11–7, 6–11, 2–11	(silver) Runner-up
2001	Thailand Open	(England) Tracey Hallam	7–0, 3–7, 4–7, 7–4, 1–7	(silver) Runner-up
2002	U.S. Open	(England) Julia Mann	3–11, 5–11	(silver) Runner-up
2002	Dutch Open	(Netherlands) Mia Audina	8–11, 2–11	(silver) Runner-up

Women's doubles
Year	Tournament	Partner	Opponent	Score	Result
1993	Swiss Open	(Russia) Marina Yakusheva	(England) Gillian Clark (England) Joanne Wright	8–15, 7–15	(silver) Runner-up
1993	Finnish Open	(Russia) Marina Yakusheva	(Denmark) Camilla Martin (Denmark) Marlene Thomsen	1–15, 3–15	(silver) Runner-up
1993	Russian Open	(Russia) Marina Yakusheva	(South Korea) Cha Yoon-sook (South Korea) Yoo Eun-young	13–15, 15–13, 15–1	(gold) Winner
1996	Polish Open	(Sweden) Christine Magnusson	(Wales) Kelly Morgan (England) Joanne Muggeridge	15–10, 15–8	(gold) Winner
1996	Russian Open	(Sweden) Christine Gandrup	(Denmark) Helene Kirkegaard (Denmark) Rikke Olsen	12–15, 15–10, 5–15	(silver) Runner-up

Mixed doubles
Year	Tournament	Partner	Opponent	Score	Result
1993	Russian Open	(Russia) Nikolai Zuyev	(Russia) Sergey Melnikov (Russia) Marina Yakusheva	17–14, 15–7	(gold) Winner
2002	U.S. Open	(England) Simon Archer	(United States) Tony Gunawan (United States) Etty Tantri	11–7, 4–11, 6–11	(silver) Runner-up

=== IBF International ===
Women's singles
Year	Tournament	Opponent	Score	Result
1992	Portugal International	(Commonwealth of Independent States) Elena Rybkhina	9–12, 7–11	(silver) Runner-up
1992	Russian International	(Commonwealth of Independent States) Marina Yakusheva	11–3, 3–11, 6–11	(silver) Runner-up
1992	Irish International	(Denmark) Lotte Thomsen	11–0, 11–0	(gold) Winner
1993	Portugal International	(Hong Kong) Wong Chun Fan	11–7, 11–2	(gold) Winner
1993	Welsh International	(Canada) Si-An Deng	12–10, 11–1	(gold) Winner
1993	La Chaux-de-Fonds International	(Sweden) Margit Borg	8–11, 7–11	(silver) Runner-up
1995	Norwegian International	(Sweden) Karolina Ericsson	11–7, 12–10	(gold) Winner
1996	La Chaux-de-Fonds International	(England) Alison Humby	11–7, 2–11, 11–4	(gold) Winner
1996	French Open	(South Korea) Lee Kyung-won	11–6, 11–3	(gold) Winner
1996	Malmö International	(Sweden) Margit Borg	6–11, 11–12	(silver) Runner-up
1996	Norwegian International	(Wales) Kelly Morgan	9–5, 9–0, 4–9, 9–8	(silver) Runner-up
1998	Norwegian International	(Sweden) Karolina Ericsson	11–4, 11–3	(gold) Winner
1998	Welsh International	(Sweden) Johanna Holgersson	11–6, 11–6	(gold) Winner
1999	Le Volant d'Or de Toulouse	(Ukraine) Elena Nozdran	11–4, 11–9	(gold) Winner

Women's doubles
Year	Tournament	Partner	Opponent	Score	Result
1992	Polish International	(Commonwealth of Independent States) Marina Yakusheva	(Denmark) Rikke Broen (Denmark) Anne Søndergaard	15–4, 15–5	(gold) Winner
1992	Portugal International	(Commonwealth of Independent States) Elena Rybkina	(England) Joanne Davies (England) Joanne Goode	4–15, 2–15	(silver) Runner-up
1992	Wimbledon Open	(Commonwealth of Independent States) Elena Rybkina	(South Korea) Kim Jae-jung (South Korea) Kim Shin-young	15–1, 5–15, 15–7	(gold) Winner
1992	Russian International	(Commonwealth of Independent States) Marina Yakusheva	(Commonwealth of Independent States) Natalja Ivanova (Commonwealth of Independent States) Julia Martynenko	17–14, 15–9	(gold) Winner
1992	Irish International	(Commonwealth of Independent States) Marina Yakusheva	(Denmark) Anne Søndergaard (Denmark) Lotte Thomsen	15–7, 15–4	(gold) Winner
1993	Portugal International	(Russia) Marina Yakusheva	(Hong Kong) Chung Hoi Yuk (Hong Kong) Wong Chun Fan	6–15, 15–6, 15–7	(gold) Winner
1998	Norwegian International	(Sweden) Catrine Bengtsson	(Hong Kong) Koon Wai Chee (Hong Kong) Ling Wan Ting	12–15, 15–6, 15–13	(gold) Winner
1998	Welsh International	(Sweden) Catrine Bengtsson	(England) Felicity Gallup (England) Joanne Muggeridge	15–8, 15–3	(gold) Winner

Mixed doubles
Year	Tournament	Partner	Opponent	Score	Result
1992	Portugal International	(Commonwealth of Independent States) Nikolai Zuyev	(England) Andy Goode (England) Joanne Goode	3–15, 10–15	(silver) Runner-up
