= Huang Chia-chi =

Taiwanese badminton player

Huang Chia-chi 黄嘉琪
Personal information
- Born: 26 January 1979 (age 47) Taipei, Taiwan
- Height: 1.71 m (5 ft 7 in)
- Weight: 64 kg (141 lb)

Sport
- Country: Australia
- Sport: Badminton
- Event: Women's singles & doubles

Women's singles & doubles
- BWF profile
Medal record
Women's badminton
Representing Australia
Oceania Championships
Gold medal – first place	2010 Invercargill	Women's singles
Oceania Mixed Team Championships
Gold medal – first place	2010 Invercargill	Mixed team
Oceania Women's Team Championships
Gold medal – first place	2010 Invercargill	Women's team
Representing Chinese Taipei
Asian Junior Championships
Bronze medal – third place	1997 Manila	Girls' singles

Huang Chia-chi (Chinese: 黃嘉琪; pinyin: Huáng Jiāqí; born 26 January 1979) is a Taiwanese badminton player who competed for the Chinese Taipei at the 1996 and 2000 Summer Olympics. Huang later represented Australia in the international tournament, and competed at the 2010 Commonwealth Games. She has won the New Zealand Open and Australian Open in 2004 and 2006. Huang was awarded the Sportswomen of the Year by the Badminton Victoria in 2006 and 2007. Her sister Huang Chia-hsin is also a badminton player.

== Achievements ==
=== Oceania Championships ===
Women's singles
Year	Venue	Opponent	Score	Result
2010	Stadium Southland; Invercargill, New Zealand	(Australia) Erica Pong	21–5, 21–7	Gold

=== Asian Junior Championships ===
Girls' singles
Year	Venue	Opponent	Score	Result
1997	Ninoy Aquino Stadium; Manila, Philippines	(China) Zhou Mi	12–10, 6–11, 9–11	Bronze

=== BWF Grand Prix (2 titles) ===
The BWF Grand Prix had two levels, the BWF Grand Prix and Grand Prix Gold. It was a series of badminton tournaments sanctioned by the Badminton World Federation (BWF) which was held from 2007 to 2017.

Women's singles
Year	Tournament	Opponent	Score	Result
2006	New Zealand Open	(Singapore) Xing Aiying	21–18, 22–24, 21–15	(gold) Winner

Women's doubles
Year	Tournament	Partner	Opponent	Score	Result
2009	Australian Open	(Australia) Tang He Tian	(India) Aparna Balan (India) Shruti Kurian	21–13, 21–9	(gold) Winner

BWF Grand Prix Gold tournament
BWF Grand Prix tournament

=== BWF International Challenge/Series (9 titles, 4 runners-up) ===
Women's singles
Year	Tournament	Opponent	Score	Result
1995	Victor Cup	(Sweden) Margit Borg	10–12, 8–11	(silver) Runner-up
2004	Austrian International	(Chinese Taipei) Cheng Shao-chieh	11–8, 8–11, 3–11	(silver) Runner-up
2004	Western Australia International	(Australia) Lenny Permana	11–7, 7–11, 11–4	(gold) Winner
2004	New Zealand International	(New Zealand) Rebecca Gordon	11–7, 11–6	(gold) Winner
2004	Australian International	(New Zealand) Rebecca Gordon	11–3, 5–11, 11–8	(gold) Winner
2005	Australian International	(Germany) Petra Overzier	4–11, 4–11	(silver) Runner-up
2006	Ballarat International	(New Zealand) Maggie Chan	21–8, 21–4	(gold) Winner
2006	North Harbour International	(New Zealand) Rachel Hindley	21–7, 21–12	(gold) Winner
2006	Victoria International	(New Zealand) Rachel Hindley	21–11, 21–9	(gold) Winner
2006	Australian International	(Japan) Chie Umezu	21–10, 21–14	(gold) Winner
2006	Welsh International	(Canada) Anna Rice	21–14, 21–10	(gold) Winner
2007	Ballarat International	(Singapore) Fu Mingtian	21–8, 13–21, 15–21	(silver) Runner-up
2010	Altona International	(Australia) Erica Pong	21–7, 21–10	(gold) Winner

BWF International Challenge tournament
BWF International Series tournament
BWF Future Series tournament
