= 1995 IBF World Championships – Mixed doubles =

Mixed doubles at the 1995 IBF World Championships
- Venue: Malley Sports Centre
- Location: Lausanne, Switzerland
- Dates: May 22, 1995 – May 28, 1995

Medalists
gold medal	Thomas Lund; Marlene Thomsen	Denmark
silver medal	Jens Eriksen; Helene Kirkegaard	Denmark
bronze medal	Jan-Eric Antonsson; Astrid Crabo	Sweden
bronze medal	Liu Jianjun; Ge Fei	China

The 9th IBF World Championships (World Badminton Championships) were held in Lausanne, Switzerland, between 22 May and 28 May 1995. Following the results of the mixed doubles.

== Main stage ==
=== Section 1 ===
1. Runde
(Denmark) Thomas Lund (Denmark) Marlene Thomsen	15	15
(Russia) Evgenij Kovalenko (Russia) Ella Karachkova	2	4
(Hungary) György Vörös (Hungary) Andrea Dakó	17	15
(Italy) Gianmarco La Rosa (Italy) Monica Memoli	5	7
(Chinese Taipei) Lee Sung-Yuan (Chinese Taipei) Tsai Hui-Min	15	15
(Mauritius) Gilles Allet (Mauritius) Marie-Josephe Jean-Pierre	3	0
(Scotland) Alastair Gatt (Scotland) Jennifer Williamson	15	15
(Switzerland) Stephan Wapp (Switzerland) Judith Baumeyer	8	2
(England) Chris Hunt (England) Gillian Gowers	15	14	15
(Belarus) Vitaliy Shmakov (Belarus) Tatiana Gerassimovitch	8	17	6
(Poland) Robert Mateusiak (Poland) Joanna Szleszyńska	w.o.
(Iceland) Árni Þór Hallgrímsson (Iceland) Guðrún Júlíusdóttir
(Canada) Anil Kaul (Canada) Si-an Deng	15	15
(Slovenia) Miha Sepec (Slovenia) Ursa Jovan	6	2
(Austria) Jürgen Koch (Trinidad and Tobago) Debra O'Connor	15	15
(India) Jan Jurka (Czech Republic) Markéta Koudelková	4	10

2. Runde
(Denmark) Thomas Lund (Denmark) Marlene Thomsen	15	15
(Hungary) György Vörös (Hungary) Andrea Dakó	0	0
(Chinese Taipei) Lee Sung-Yuan (Chinese Taipei) Tsai Hui-Min	3	15	15
(Scotland) Alastair Gatt (Scotland) Jennifer Williamson	15	12	8
(England) Chris Hunt (England) Gillian Gowers	15	15
(Poland) Robert Mateusiak (Poland) Joanna Szleszyńska	5	7
(Canada) Anil Kaul (Canada) Si-an Deng	15	13	15
(Austria) Jürgen Koch (Trinidad and Tobago) Debra O'Connor	9	18	12

3. Runde
(Denmark) Thomas Lund (Denmark) Marlene Thomsen	15	15
(Chinese Taipei) Lee Sung-Yuan (Chinese Taipei) Tsai Hui-Min	0	1
(England) Chris Hunt (England) Gillian Gowers	15	15	15
(Canada) Anil Kaul (Canada) Si-an Deng	12	17	3

Achtelfinale
(Denmark) Thomas Lund (Denmark) Marlene Thomsen	15	15
(England) Chris Hunt (England) Gillian Gowers	8	5

=== Section 2 ===
1. Runde
(South Korea) Kim Dong-moon (South Korea) Gil Young-ah	15	16	15
(Netherlands) Ron Michels (Netherlands) Erica van den Heuvel	6	18	4
(Ukraine) Valeriy Strelcov (Ukraine) Elena Nozdran	15	12	15
(Australia) Paul Staight (Australia) Song Yang	5	15	0
(Indonesia) Flandy Limpele (Indonesia) Rosalina Riseu	15	15
(New Zealand) Grant Walker (New Zealand) Tammy Jenkins	4	5
(Thailand) Pornsawan Plungwech (Thailand) Khunakorn Sudhisodhi	w.o.
(Kazakhstan) Konstantin Dubs (Kazakhstan) Irina Gritsenko
(China) Chen Xingdong (China) Wang Xiaoyuan	15	15
(Germany) Kai Mitteldorf (Germany) Katrin Schmidt	13	6
(Argentina) Jorge Meyer (Argentina) Marion Meyer	15	15
(Morocco) Boumediane Louati (Morocco) Rachida Ait Lamarani	5	2
(Hong Kong) Chan Siu Kwong (Hong Kong) Tung Chau Man	15	15
(Malta) Martin Farrugia (Malta) Yvette Mallia	1	3
(Chinese Taipei) Lee Mou-Chou (Chinese Taipei) Chen Li-Chin	15	15
(Norway) Jim Ronny Andersen (Norway) Sissel Linderoth	7	8

2. Runde
(South Korea) Kim Dong-moon (South Korea) Gil Young-ah	18	15
(Ukraine) Valeriy Strelcov (Ukraine) Elena Nozdran	16	2	4
(Indonesia) Flandy Limpele (Indonesia) Rosalina Riseu	18	15
(Thailand) Pornsawan Plungwech (Thailand) Khunakorn Sudhisodhi	16	3
(China) Chen Xingdong (China) Wang Xiaoyuan	15	15
(Argentina) Jorge Meyer (Argentina) Marion Meyer	2	0
(Hong Kong) Chan Siu Kwong (Hong Kong) Tung Chau Man	15	15
(Chinese Taipei) Lee Mou-Chou (Chinese Taipei) Chen Li-Chin	9	8

3. Runde
(South Korea) Kim Dong-moon (South Korea) Gil Young-ah	15	15
(Indonesia) Flandy Limpele (Indonesia) Rosalina Riseu	8	8
(China) Chen Xingdong (China) Wang Xiaoyuan	15	15
(Hong Kong) Chan Siu Kwong (Hong Kong) Tung Chau Man	5	5

Achtelfinale
(South Korea) Kim Dong-moon (South Korea) Gil Young-ah	11	15	15
(China) Chen Xingdong (China) Wang Xiaoyuan	15	10	11

=== Section 3 ===
1. Runde
(Sweden) Jan-Eric Antonsson (Sweden) Astrid Crabo	w.o.
(Hong Kong) Tam Kai Chuen (Hong Kong) Tung Chau Man
(Slovakia) Robert Cyprian (Slovakia) Zuzana Kenizova	15	15
(Croatia) Silvio Jurčić (Croatia) Andrea Jurčić	10	6
(Germany) Uwe Ossenbrink (Germany) Viola Rathgeber	15	15
(Slovenia) Ales Babnik (Slovenia) Mateja Slatnar	11	8
(Japan) Akihiro Imai (Japan) Miwa Kai	15	15
(Russia) Vladislav Tikhomirov (Russia) Natalia Djachkova	5	7
(Denmark) Christian Jakobsen (Denmark) Lotte Olsen	15	15
(Bulgaria) Pjuzant Kassabian (Bulgaria) Neli Boteva	0	0
(Iceland) Guðmundur Adolfsson (Iceland) Vigdís Ásgeirsdóttir	15	15
(Italy) Andreas Pichler (Italy) Beate Dejaco	3	7
(Switzerland) Jorge Rodriguez (Switzerland) Silvia Albrecht	15	15
(Pakistan) Mirza Ali Yar Beg (Pakistan) Zarina Jamal	3	1
(Nigeria) Obiageli Olorunsola (Nigeria) Kayode Akinsanya	15	2	15
(Hungary) Gyula Szalai (Hungary) Andrea Ódor	8	15	12

2. Runde
(Sweden) Jan-Eric Antonsson (Sweden) Astrid Crabo	15	15
(Slovakia) Robert Cyprian (Slovakia) Zuzana Kenizova	4	1
(Germany) Uwe Ossenbrink (Germany) Viola Rathgeber	18	15
(Japan) Akihiro Imai (Japan) Miwa Kai	16	12
(Denmark) Christian Jakobsen (Denmark) Lotte Olsen	15	15
(Iceland) Guðmundur Adolfsson (Iceland) Vigdís Ásgeirsdóttir	3	4
(Switzerland) Jorge Rodriguez (Switzerland) Silvia Albrecht	15	15
(Nigeria) Obiageli Olorunsola (Nigeria) Kayode Akinsanya	10	3

3. Runde
(Sweden) Jan-Eric Antonsson (Sweden) Astrid Crabo	15	15
(Germany) Uwe Ossenbrink (Germany) Viola Rathgeber	4	3
915	(Denmark) Christian Jakobsen (Denmark) Lotte Olsen	15
(Switzerland) Jorge Rodriguez (Switzerland) Silvia Albrecht	8	5

Achtelfinale
(Sweden) Jan-Eric Antonsson (Sweden) Astrid Crabo	9	15	15
(Denmark) Christian Jakobsen (Denmark) Lotte Olsen	15	6	6

=== Section 4 ===
1. Runde
(England) Simon Archer (England) Julie Bradbury	15	15
(Brazil) Euclides Freitas (Brazil) Cristina Nakano	0	3
(Indonesia) Aryono Miranat (Indonesia) Dede Hasanah	15	15
(Mauritius) Édouard Clarisse (Mauritius) Martine de Souza	5	7
(Scotland) Russell Hogg (Scotland) Jillian Haldane	15	18
(Bulgaria) Svetoslav Stoyanov (Bulgaria) Diana Koleva	9	15
(Canada) Mike Beres (Canada) Robbyn Hermitage	15	15
(Cyprus) Nicolas Pissis (Cyprus) Christina Christofia	1	9
(China) Jiang Xin (China) Zhang Jin	15	15	18
(Chinese Taipei) Jou Yu-Lin (Chinese Taipei) Juang Jinn-Der	17	7	16
(Peru) Gustavo Salazar (Peru) Silvia Jiménez	15	15
(Belgium) Filip Vigneron (Belgium) Heidi Vranken	5	8
(South Korea) Ha Tae-kwon (South Korea) Kim Shin-young	15	15
(United States) Thomas Reidy (United States) Stephanie Wo	4	3
(Australia) Murray Hocking (Australia) Amanda Hardy	15	15
(Finland) Mikael Segercrantz (Finland) Malin Virta	4	5

2. Runde
(England) Simon Archer (England) Julie Bradbury	15	15
(Indonesia) Aryono Miranat (Indonesia) Dede Hasanah	5	10
(Scotland) Russell Hogg (Scotland) Jillian Haldane	15	15
(Canada) Mike Beres (Canada) Robbyn Hermitage	7	8
(China) Jiang Xin (China) Zhang Jin	15	15
(Peru) Gustavo Salazar (Peru) Silvia Jiménez	3	2
(South Korea) Ha Tae-kwon (South Korea) Kim Shin-young	15	15
(Australia) Murray Hocking (Australia) Amanda Hardy	12	6

3. Runde
(England) Simon Archer (England) Julie Bradbury	15	18
(Scotland) Russell Hogg (Scotland) Jillian Haldane	8	15
(China) Jiang Xin (China) Zhang Jin	15	15
(South Korea) Ha Tae-kwon (South Korea) Kim Shin-young	12	6

Achtelfinale
(England) Simon Archer (England) Julie Bradbury	15	15
(China) Jiang Xin (China) Zhang Jin	13	9

=== Section 5 ===
1. Runde
(Denmark) Jens Eriksen (Denmark) Helene Kirkegaard	15	15
(Scotland) Kenny Middlemiss (Scotland) Elinor Middlemiss	9	10
(France) Manuel Dubrulle (France) Virginie Delvingt	15	15
(Malta) Aldo Polidano (Malta) Joanne Grech	1	4
(Hong Kong) He Tim (Hong Kong) Chan Oi Ni	15	15
(Switzerland) Robbert de Kock (Switzerland) Santi Wibowo	12	9
(Australia) Craig Booley (Australia) Nicole Harwood	15	17
(Mauritius) Stephan Beeharry (Mauritius) Vandanah Seesurun	5	15
(England) Nick Ponting (England) Joanne Goode	15	15
(Bulgaria) Slantchezar Tzankov (Bulgaria) Emilia Dimitrova	1	4
(China) Yu Qi (China) Sun Man	15	15
(Italy) Enrico La Rosa (Italy) Maria Luisa Mur	2	4
(Canada) Brent Olynyk (Canada) Heather Poole	15	15
(Belgium) Luigi Dalli Cardillo (Belgium) Peggy Mampaey	7	7
(Pakistan) Islam Amir (Pakistan) Ayesha Akram	15	15
(Turkey) Mert Aydogmus (Turkey) Gul Simsek	2	4	5

2. Runde
(Denmark) Jens Eriksen (Denmark) Helene Kirkegaard	15	15
(France) Manuel Dubrulle (France) Virginie Delvingt	3	9
(Hong Kong) He Tim (Hong Kong) Chan Oi Ni	15	15
(Australia) Craig Booley (Australia) Nicole Harwood	4	2
(England) Nick Ponting (England) Joanne Goode	15	15
(China) Yu Qi (China) Sun Man	10	5
(Canada) Brent Olynyk (Canada) Heather Poole	15	15
(Pakistan) Islam Amir (Pakistan) Ayesha Akram	4	1

3. Runde
(Denmark) Jens Eriksen (Denmark) Helene Kirkegaard	10	17	15
(Hong Kong) He Tim (Hong Kong) Chan Oi Ni	15	16	6
(England) Nick Ponting (England) Joanne Goode	15	15
(Canada) Brent Olynyk (Canada) Heather Poole	3	10

Achtelfinale
(Denmark) Jens Eriksen (Denmark) Helene Kirkegaard	15	11	18
(England) Nick Ponting (England) Joanne Goode	7	15	15

=== Section 6 ===
1. Runde
(Denmark) Jon Holst-Christensen (Denmark) Rikke Olsen	15	15
(Peru) Mario Carulla (Peru) Ximena Bellido	1	5
(Chinese Taipei) Chang Jeng-Shyuang (Chinese Taipei) Chan Ya-Lin	15	15
(Argentina) Alejandro Meyer (Argentina) Alice Garay	1	2
(Japan) Fumihiko Machida (Japan) Tomomi Matsuo	15	15'
(Slovenia) Andrej Pohar (Slovenia) Maja Pohar	5	2
(Germany) Björn Siegemund (Germany) Kerstin Ubben	15	15
(Peru) Richárd Bánhidi (Peru) Adrienn Kocsis	2	6
(South Korea) Kim Mee-hyang (South Korea) Kang Kyung-jin	15	15
(Canada) Frederic D'Amours (Canada) Milaine Cloutier	0	6
(England) John Quinn (England) Joanne Muggeridge	15	15
(Norway) Trond Wåland (Norway) Camilla Wright	10	15
(Indonesia) Sandiarto (Indonesia) Sri Untari	15	15
(New Zealand) Glenn Stewart (New Zealand) Julie Still	6	9
(Spain) Arturo Ruiz (Spain) Dolores Marco	15	15
(Kazakhstan) Anton Tiajkoun (Kazakhstan) Ludmila Okuneva	13	4

2. Runde
(Denmark) Jon Holst-Christensen (Denmark) Rikke Olsen	15	15
(Chinese Taipei) Chang Jeng-Shyuang (Chinese Taipei) Chan Ya-Lin	5	2
(Japan) Fumihiko Machida (Japan) Tomomi Matsuo	12	15	15
(Germany) Björn Siegemund (Germany) Kerstin Ubben	15	5	10
(South Korea) Kim Mee-hyang (South Korea) Kang Kyung-jin	15	15
(England) John Quinn (England) Joanne Muggeridge	5	7
(Indonesia) Sandiarto (Indonesia) Sri Untari	15	15
(Spain) Arturo Ruiz (Spain) Dolores Marco	6	2

3. Runde
(Denmark) Jon Holst-Christensen (Denmark) Rikke Olsen	15	15
(Japan) Fumihiko Machida (Japan) Tomomi Matsuo	6	6
(South Korea) Kim Mee-hyang (South Korea) Kang Kyung-jin	15	15
(Indonesia) Sandiarto (Indonesia) Sri Untari	3	4

Achtelfinale
(Denmark) Jon Holst-Christensen (Denmark) Rikke Olsen	15	14	15
(South Korea) Kim Mee-hyang (South Korea) Kang Kyung-jin	4	18	6

=== Section 7 ===
1. Runde
(China) Liu Jianjun (China) Ge Fei	15	15
(Switzerland) Lawrence Si Hock Chew (Switzerland) Yvonne Naef	3	4
(South Korea) Lee Dong-soo (South Korea) Park Soo-yun	15	15
(Italy) Christian Hinteregger (Italy) Petra Schrott	6	0
(Canada) Darryl Yung (Canada) Denyse Julien	15	15
(Cyprus) Antonis L. Lazarou (Cyprus) Maria Iasonos	0	0
(Australia) Peter Blackburn (Australia) Rhonda Cator	17	7	17
(Chinese Taipei) Huang Chuan-Chen (Chinese Taipei) Lee Ming-Hwa	6	17	14
(England) Ian Pearson (England) Joanne Davies	15	15
(Slovenia) Miha Kosnik (Slovenia) Darja Kranjc	0	4
(Finland) Jyri Aalto (Finland) Nina Sarnesto	15	15
(Germany) Volker Renzelmann (Germany) Sandra Beißel	11	2
(Ukraine) Vladislav Druzchenko (Ukraine) Viktoria Evtushenko	17	15
(Thailand) Plernta Boonyarit (Thailand) Siripong Siripool	14	6
(Iceland) Broddi Kristjánsson (Iceland) Elsa Nielsen	15	15
(Malta) Kenneth Vella (Malta) Catherine Dimech	5	4

2. Runde
(China) Liu Jianjun (China) Ge Fei	15	15
(South Korea) Lee Dong-soo (South Korea) Park Soo-yun	7	9
(Canada) Darryl Yung (Canada) Denyse Julien	1	15	15
(Australia) Peter Blackburn (Australia) Rhonda Cator	15	5	6
(England) Ian Pearson (England) Joanne Davies	15	15
(Finland) Jyri Aalto (Finland) Nina Sarnesto	5	2
(Ukraine) Vladislav Druzchenko (Ukraine) Viktoria Evtushenko	15	15
(Iceland) Broddi Kristjánsson (Iceland) Elsa Nielsen	3	7

3. Runde
(China) Liu Jianjun (China) Ge Fei	15	15
(Canada) Darryl Yung (Canada) Denyse Julien	5	8
(England) Ian Pearson (England) Joanne Davies	0	15	15
(Ukraine) Vladislav Druzchenko (Ukraine) Viktoria Evtushenko	15	6	4

Achtelfinale
(China) Liu Jianjun (China) Ge Fei	15	15
(England) Ian Pearson (England) Joanne Davies	12	5

=== Section 8 ===
1. Runde
(Indonesia) Tri Kusharyanto (Indonesia) Minarti Timur	15	15
(Morocco) Abdelhadi Kella (Morocco) Fatima Nassim	2	6
(Brazil) Leandro Santos (Brazil) Patricia Finardi	15	13	15
(Slovakia) Peter Pudela (Slovakia) Alexandra Felgrova	13	15	17
(Denmark) Michael Søgaard (Denmark) Ann Jørgensen	15	15
(United States) David Shaw (United States) Kathy Zimmerman	7	6
(Spain) David Serrano (Spain) Patricia Pérez	15	8	15
(Italy) Andrea Chiappini (Italy) Maria Grazia Italiano	7	15	4
(Germany) Michael Keck (Germany) Karen Neumann	15	15
(Japan) Norio Imai (Japan) Haruko Matsuda	6	2
(Belarus) Vyatcheslav Roudnitski (Belarus) Olga Ilioushchenkova	4	15	15
(Bulgaria) Tzvetozar Kolev (Bulgaria) Rayna Tzvetkova	15	12	12
(England) James Anderson (England) Nichola Beck	15	15
(Nigeria) Olamide Toyin Adebayo (Nigeria) Wasiu Ogunseye	2	3
(Poland) Damian Pławecki (Poland) Dorota Borek	w.o.
(Kazakhstan) Igor Dmitriev (Kazakhstan) Olesia Sholar

2. Runde
(Indonesia) Tri Kusharyanto (Indonesia) Minarti Timur	15	15
(Brazil) Leandro Santos (Brazil) Patricia Finardi	2	8
(Denmark) Michael Søgaard (Denmark) Ann Jørgensen	15	15
(Spain) David Serrano (Spain) Patricia Pérez	2	2
(Germany) Michael Keck (Germany) Karen Neumann	15	15
(Belarus) Vyatcheslav Roudnitski (Belarus) Olga Ilioushchenkova	8	3
(England) James Anderson (England) Nichola Beck	15	16	15
(Poland) Damian Pławecki (Poland) Dorota Borek	8	17	9

3. Runde
(Indonesia) Tri Kusharyanto (Indonesia) Minarti Timur	15	16
(Denmark) Michael Søgaard (Denmark) Ann Jørgensen	10	18	6
(Germany) Michael Keck (Germany) Karen Neumann	15	15
(England) James Anderson (England) Nichola Beck	12	3

Achtelfinale
(Indonesia) Tri Kusharyanto (Indonesia) Minarti Timur	14	15
(Germany) Michael Keck (Germany) Karen Neumann	17	8	11

== Final stage ==
Quarterfinals
(Denmark) Thomas Lund (Denmark) Marlene Thomsen	15	15
(South Korea) Kim Dong-moon (South Korea) Gil Young-ah	10	7
(Sweden) Jan-Eric Antonsson (Sweden) Astrid Crabo	17	15
(England) Simon Archer (England) Julie Bradbury	15	4
(Denmark) Jens Eriksen (Denmark) Helene Kirkegaard	13	15	15
(Denmark) Jon Holst-Christensen (Denmark) Rikke Olsen	18	9	11
(China) Liu Jianjun (China) Ge Fei	15	15
(Indonesia) Tri Kusharyanto (Indonesia) Minarti Timur	8	6

Semifinals
(Denmark) Thomas Lund (Denmark) Marlene Thomsen	12	17	15
(Sweden) Jan-Eric Antonsson (Sweden) Astrid Crabo	15	14	9
(Denmark) Jens Eriksen (Denmark) Helene Kirkegaard	15	15
(China) Liu Jianjun (China) Ge Fei	5	3

Finals
(Denmark) Thomas Lund (Denmark) Marlene Thomsen	15	15
(Denmark) Jens Eriksen (Denmark) Helene Kirkegaard	2	6
