= Badminton at the 1996 Summer Olympics – Mixed doubles =

Badminton at the Olympics

Mixed doubles at the Games of the XXVI Olympiad
- Venue: Georgia State University Gymnasium
- Date: 26 July – 1 August 1996
- Competitors: 32 pairs from 18 nations

Medalists
1st place, gold medalist(s)		Kim Dong-moon; Gil Young-ah	South Korea
2nd place, silver medalist(s)		Park Joo-bong; Ra Kyung-min	South Korea
3rd place, bronze medalist(s)		Liu Jianjun; Sun Man	China

The mixed doubles badminton event at the 1996 Summer Olympics was held from 26 July to 1 August 1996. The tournament was single-elimination. Matches consisted of three sets, with sets being to 15 for mixed doubles. The tournament was held at the Georgia State University Gymnasium.

== Seeds ==
1. (South Korea) Park Joo-bong / Ra Kyung-min (silver medalist)
2. (Indonesia) Trikus Heryanto / Minarti Timur (quarterfinals)
3. (China) Liu Jianjun / Sun Man (bronze medalist)
4. (China) Chen Xingdong / Peng Xingyong (fourth place)

== Results ==
=== Finals ===
Semifinals
1	(South Korea) Park Joo-bong (South Korea) Ra Kyung-min	15	15
3	(China) Liu Jianjun (China) Sun Man	10	4
4	(China) Chen Xingdong (China) Peng Xingyong	6	8
(South Korea) Kim Dong-moon (South Korea) Gil Young-ah	15	15

Final
1	(South Korea) Park Joo-bong (South Korea) Ra Kyung-min	15	4	12
(South Korea) Kim Dong-moon (South Korea) Gil Young-ah	13	15	15
Bronze medal match
3	(China) Liu Jianjun (China) Sun Man	7	15	15
4	(China) Chen Xingdong (China) Peng Xingyong	15	4	8

=== Top half ===
First round
1	(South Korea) Park Joo-bong (South Korea) Ra Kyung-min	15	15
(Canada) Iain Sydie (Canada) Doris Piche	3	6
(Sweden) Peter Axelsson (Sweden) Catrine Bengtsson	15	15
(United Kingdom) Chris Hunt (United Kingdom) Joanne Muggeridge	5	8
(China) Tao Xiaoqiang (China) Wang Xiaoyuan	15	15
(Australia) Murray Hocking (Australia) Lisa Campbell	5	4
(Denmark) Christian Jacobsen (Denmark) Lotte Olsen	15	15
(Nigeria) Kayode Akinsanya (Nigeria) Obiageli Olorunsola	1	2
3	(China) Liu Jianjun (China) Sun Man	15	15
(Canada) Anil Kaul (Canada) Si-An Deng	12	3
(Belarus) Mikhail Korchouk (Belarus) Vlada Tcherniavskaia	14	9
(Australia) Peter Blackburn (Australia) Rhonda Cator	18	15
(United Kingdom) Simon Archer (United Kingdom) Julie Bradbury	5	6
(Indonesia) Flandy Limpele (Indonesia) Riseu Rosalina	15	15
(Denmark) Jens Eriksen (Denmark) Helene Kirkegaard	15	15
(Mauritius) Stephan Beehary (Mauritius) Martine de Souza	6	8

Second round
1	(South Korea) Park Joo-bong (South Korea) Ra Kyung-min	15	17
(Sweden) Peter Axelsson (Sweden) Catrine Bengtsson	1	15
(China) Tao Xiaoqiang (China) Wang Xiaoyuan	16	15	15
(Denmark) Christian Jacobsen (Denmark) Lotte Olsen	17	6	5
3	(China) Liu Jianjun (China) Sun Man	15	7	15
(Australia) Peter Blackburn (Australia) Rhonda Cator	4	15	4
(Indonesia) Flandy Limpele (Indonesia) Riseu Rosalina	10	15	15
(Denmark) Jens Eriksen (Denmark) Helene Kirkegaard	15	9	9

Quarterfinals
1	(South Korea) Park Joo-bong (South Korea) Ra Kyung-min	15	15
(China) Tao Xiaoqiang (China) Wang Xiaoyuan	7	9
3	(China) Liu Jianjun (China) Sun Man	15	5	15
(Indonesia) Flandy Limpele (Indonesia) Riseu Rosalina	2	15	7

Semifinals
1	(South Korea) Park Joo-bong (South Korea) Ra Kyung-min	15	15
3	(China) Liu Jianjun (China) Sun Man	10	4

=== Bottom half ===
First round
(Bulgaria) Todor Velkov (Bulgaria) Neli Nedjalkova	4	6
(Netherlands) Ron Michels (Netherlands) Erica van den Heuvel	15	15
(Ukraine) Vladislav Druzchenko (Ukraine) Victoria Evtoushenko	5	5
(Denmark) Michael Sogaard (Denmark) Rikke Olsen	15	15
(Canada) Darryl Yung (Canada) Denyse Julien	15	15
(Australia) Paul Stevenson (Australia) Amanda Hardy	9	3
(Switzerland) Thomas Wapp (Switzerland) Santi Wibowo	5	2
4	(China) Chen Xingdong (China) Peng Xingyong	15	15
(Germany) Michael Keck (Germany) Karen Stechmann	10	14
(United Kingdom) Nick Ponting (United Kingdom) Joanne Wright	15	18
(Hong Kong) He Tim (Hong Kong) Chan Oi Ni	6	10
(South Korea) Kim Dong-moon (South Korea) Gil Young-ah	15	15
(Sweden) Jan-Eric Antonsson (Sweden) Astrid Crabo	15	15
(Mauritius) Eddy Clarisse (Mauritius) Marie-Josephe Jean-Pierre	4	12
(Russia) Nikolai Zuyev (Russia) Marina Yakusheva	6	6
2	(Indonesia) Trikus Heryanto (Indonesia) Minarti Timur	15	15

Second round
(Netherlands) Ron Michels (Netherlands) Erica van den Heuvel	4	6
(Denmark) Michael Sogaard (Denmark) Rikke Olsen	15	15
(Canada) Darryl Yung (Canada) Denyse Julien	11	6
4	(China) Chen Xingdong (China) Peng Xingyong	15	15
(United Kingdom) Nick Ponting (United Kingdom) Joanne Wright	13	1
(South Korea) Kim Dong-moon (South Korea) Gil Young-ah	18	15
(Sweden) Jan-Eric Antonsson (Sweden) Astrid Crabo	5	13
2	(Indonesia) Trikus Heryanto (Indonesia) Minarti Timur	15	18

Quarterfinals
(Denmark) Michael Sogaard (Denmark) Rikke Olsen	10	15	15
4	(China) Chen Xingdong (China) Peng Xingyong	15	6	18
(South Korea) Kim Dong-moon (South Korea) Gil Young-ah	15	15
2	(Indonesia) Trikus Heryanto (Indonesia) Minarti Timur	4	13

Semifinals
4	(China) Chen Xingdong (China) Peng Xingyong	6	8
(South Korea) Kim Dong-moon (South Korea) Gil Young-ah	15	15

== Sources ==
- Badminton at the 1996 Atlanta Summer Games: Women's Doubles
- The Official Report of the Centennial Olympic Games Volume Three ˗ The Competition Results (PDF). p. 114. Archived from the original (PDF) on 27 September 2007.
