= Rosalina Riseu =

Indonesian badminton player

Personal information
- Born: 19 September 1972 (age 54)
- Height: 1.63 m (5 ft 4 in)

Sport
- Country: Indonesia
- Sport: Badminton
- Handedness: Right
- BWF profile
Medal record
Women's badminton
Representing Indonesia
World Cup
Silver medal – second place	1996 Jakarta	Mixed doubles
Bronze medal – third place	1994 Ho Chi Minh	Mixed doubles
Bronze medal – third place	1995 Jakarta	Mixed doubles
Bronze medal – third place	1997 Yogyakarta	Mixed doubles
Asian Championships
Bronze medal – third place	1996 Surabaya	Mixed doubles

Rosalina Riseu (born 19 September 1972) is an Indonesian retired badminton player who specialized in doubles events. She competed at the 1996 Summer Olympics alongside Flandy Limpele in the mixed doubles event, finished in the quarterfinals after defeated by Chinese pair Liu Jianjun and Sun Man.

== Achievements ==
=== World Cup ===
Mixed doubles
Year	Venue	Partner	Opponent	Score	Result
1994	Phan Đình Phùng Indoor Stadium; Ho Chi Minh City, Vietnam	(Indonesia) Aryono Miranat	(China) Chen Xingdong (China) Gu Jun	10–15, 6–15	Bronze
1995	Istora Senayan, Jakarta, Indonesia	(Indonesia) Flandy Limpele	(South Korea) Kim Dong-moon (South Korea) Kim Shin-young	15–9, 9–15, 14–17	Bronze
1996	Istora Senayan, Jakarta, Indonesia	(Indonesia) Flandy Limpele	(Indonesia) Sandiarto (Indonesia) Minarti Timur	14–17, 7–15	Silver
1997	Among Rogo Sports Hall, Yogyakarta, Indonesia	(Indonesia) Flandy Limpele	(China) Liu Yong (China) Ge Fei	15–12, 7–15, 2–15	Bronze

=== Asian Championships ===
Mixed doubles
Year	Venue	Partner	Opponent	Score	Result
1996	GOR Pancasila, Surabaya, Indonesia	(Indonesia) Flandy Limpele	(South Korea) Kang Kyung-jin (South Korea) Kim Mee-hyang	15–2, 7–15, 10–15	Bronze

=== IBF World Grand Prix ===
The World Badminton Grand Prix was sanctioned by the International Badminton Federation from 1983 to 2006.

Mixed doubles
Year	Tournament	Partner	Opponent	Score	Result
1993	Hong Kong Open	(Indonesia) Aryono Miranat	(Indonesia) Rudy Gunawan (Indonesia) Rosiana Tendean	12–15, 6–15	(silver) Runner-up
1995	Indonesia Open	(Indonesia) Flandy Limpele	(Indonesia) Tri Kusharjanto (Indonesia) Minarti Timur	10–15, 5–15	(silver) Runner-up
1995	Denmark Open	(Indonesia) Flandy Limpele	(China) Chen Xingdong (China) Peng Xinyong	15–3, 10–15, 12–15	(silver) Runner-up
1996	Indonesia Open	(Indonesia) Flandy Limpele	(Indonesia) Tri Kusharjanto (Indonesia) Minarti Timur	8–15, 1–15	(silver) Runner-up
1996	Thailand Open	(Indonesia) Flandy Limpele	(Indonesia) Tri Kusharjanto (Indonesia) Minarti Timur	5–15, 7–15	(silver) Runner-up
1997	Indonesia Open	(Indonesia) Bambang Suprianto	(Indonesia) Tri Kusharjanto (Indonesia) Minarti Timur	11–15, 6–15	(silver) Runner-up
1997	Singapore Open	(Indonesia) Bambang Suprianto	(South Korea) Kim Dong-moon (South Korea) Park So-yun	15–13, 15–9	(gold) Winner
1997	U.S. Open	(Indonesia) Bambang Suprianto	(South Korea) Kim Dong-moon (South Korea) Ra Kyung-min	1–15, 3–15	(silver) Runner-up
1997	Vietnam Open	(Indonesia) Bambang Suprianto	(South Korea) Lee Dong-soo (South Korea) Park Soo-yun	15–5, 15–10	(gold) Winner

IBF Grand Prix tournament
IBF Grand Prix Finals tournament

=== IBF International ===
Women's doubles
Year	Tournament	Partner	Opponent	Score	Result
1992	Brunei Open	(Indonesia) Lilik Sudarwati	(Malaysia) Kuak Seok Choon (Malaysia) Tan Lee Wai	15–3, 15–0	(gold) Winner
1993	Amor International	(Indonesia) Catherine	(Russia) Natalja Ivanova (Russia) Julia Martynenko	15–8, 7–15, 11–15	(silver) Runner-up

Mixed doubles
Year	Tournament	Partner	Opponent	Score	Result
1997	Indonesia International	(Indonesia) Bambang Suprianto	(Indonesia) Wahyu Agung (Indonesia) Rosalia Anastasia	15–11, 15–11	(gold) Winner
