= 1992 Indonesia Open (badminton) =

The 1992 Indonesia Open in badminton was held in Semarang, from September 16 to September 20, 1992. It was a five-star tournament and the prize money was US$166,000.

== Venue ==
- GOR Jatidiri

== Final results ==
Category	Winners	Runners-up	Score
Men's singles	(Indonesia) Ardy Wiranata	(Indonesia) Joko Suprianto	15–7, 6–15, 15–9
Women's singles	(China) Ye Zhaoying	(Indonesia) Sarwendah Kusumawardhani	11–7, 11–6
Men's doubles	(Indonesia) Eddy Hartono & Rudy Gunawan	(Indonesia) Ricky Subagja & Rexy Mainaky	15–12, 15–5
Women's doubles	(Indonesia) Rosiana Tendean & Erma Sulistianingsih	(England) Gillian Clark & Gillian Gowers	15–12, 15–9
Mixed doubles	(Sweden) Pär-Gunnar Jönsson & Maria Bengtsson	(Indonesia) Aryono Miranat & Eliza Nathanael	15–12, 11–15, 15–9
