= 1994 Asian Badminton Championships =

Badminton championships

Tournament information
- Location: Shanghai Gymnasium, Shanghai, China
- Dates: April 6–April 10

The 1994 Asian Badminton Championships was the 13th edition of the Badminton Asia Championships. It was held in Shanghai Gymnasium, Shanghai, China, from April 6 to April 10. Except the Men's singles discipline which was won by Malaysia; China won all the titles.

== Medalists ==
Event	Gold	Silver	Bronze
Men's singles	(Malaysia) Foo Kok Keong	(China) Liu Jun	(South Korea) Park Sung-woo
Men's singles	(Malaysia) Foo Kok Keong	(China) Liu Jun	(Indonesia) Marleve Mainaky
Women's singles	(China) Ye Zhaoying	(China) Liu Yuhong	(China) Sun Jian
Women's singles	(China) Ye Zhaoying	(China) Liu Yuhong	(South Korea) Kim Ji-hyun
Men's doubles	(China) Chen Kang (China) Chen Hongyong	(Malaysia) Tan Kim Her (Malaysia) Yap Kim Hock	(China) Huang Zhanzhong (China) Jiang Xin
Men's doubles	(China) Chen Kang (China) Chen Hongyong	(Malaysia) Tan Kim Her (Malaysia) Yap Kim Hock	(Malaysia) Jalani Sidek (Malaysia) Razif Sidek
Women's doubles	(China) Ge Fei (China) Gu Jun	(China) Chen Ying (China) Wu Yuhong	(China) Peng Xinyong (China) Zhang Jin
Women's doubles	(China) Ge Fei (China) Gu Jun	(China) Chen Ying (China) Wu Yuhong	(South Korea) Jang Hye-ock (South Korea) Shim Eun-jung
Mixed doubles	(China) Chen Xingdong (China) Sun Man	(China) Wang Xiaoyuan (China) Liu Jianjun	(Indonesia) Sandiarto (Indonesia) Sri Untari
Mixed doubles	(China) Chen Xingdong (China) Sun Man	(China) Wang Xiaoyuan (China) Liu Jianjun	(South Korea) Yoo Yong-sung (South Korea) Jang Hye-ock

== Medal table ==
Rank	Nation	Gold	Silver	Bronze	Total
1	China (CHN)	4	4	3	11
2	Malaysia (MAS)	1	1	1	3
3	South Korea	0	0	4	4
4	Indonesia (INA)	0	0	2	2
Totals (4 entries)		5	5	10	20

== Final results ==
=== Men's singles ===
Semi-finals
(China) Liu Jun	15	4	15
(South Korea) Park Sung-woo	5	15	12
(Malaysia) Foo Kok Keong	15	15
(Indonesia) Marleve Mainaky	6	7

Final
(China) Liu Jun	13	15	3
(Malaysia) Foo Kok Keong	15	9	15

=== Women's singles ===
Semi-finals
(China) Ye Zhaoying	11	12
(China) Sun Jian	9	11
(China) Liu Yuhong	11	11	11
(South Korea) Kim Ji-hyun	12	7	5

Final
(China) Ye Zhaoying	11	12
(China) Liu Yuhong	4	10

=== Men's doubles ===
Semi-finals
(China) Chen Hongyong (China) Chen Kang	15	15
(Malaysia) Jalani Sidek (Malaysia) Razif Sidek	8	10
(Malaysia) Tan Kim Her (Malaysia) Yap Kim Hock	15	15
(China) Huang Zhanzhong (China) Jiang Xin	4	3

Final
(China) Chen Hongyong (China) Chen Kang	15	15
(Malaysia) Tan Kim Her (Malaysia) Yap Kim Hock	10	11

=== Women's doubles ===
Semi-finals
(China) Chen Ying (China) Wu Yuhong	15	15
(China) Peng Xinyong (China) Zhang Jin	3	9
(China) Ge Fei (China) Gu Jun	15	15
(South Korea) Jang Hye-ock (South Korea) Shim Eun-jung	6	8

Final
(China) Chen Ying (China) Wu Yuhong	11	14
(China) Ge Fei (China) Gu Jun	15	18

=== Mixed doubles ===
Semi-finals
(Indonesia) Sandiarto (Indonesia) Sri Untari	9	9
(China) Chen Xingdong (China) Sun Man	15	15
(China) Liu Jianjun (China) Wang Xiaoyuan	15	6	15
(South Korea) Yoo Yong-sung (South Korea) Jang Hye-ock	6	15	5

Final
(China) Chen Xingdong (China) Sun Man	15	15
(China) Liu Jianjun (China) Wang Xiaoyuan	1	11
