= 2023 BWF World Senior Championships – 60+ =

Tournament details
- Dates: 11 September 2023 – 17 September 2023
- Edition: 11
- Level: International
- Competitors: 151 from 25 nations
- Venue: Hwasan Indoor Stadium; Jeonju Indoor Badminton Hall
- Location: Jeonju, South Korea

Champions
- Men's singles: (Sweden) Jan-Eric Antonsson
- Women's singles: (Netherlands) Jeannette van der Werff
- Men's doubles: (Sweden) Jan-Eric Antonsson (Denmark) Jan Bertram Petersen
- Women's doubles: (Republic of Ireland) Pamela Peard (Republic of Ireland) Sian Williams
- Mixed doubles: (China) Xiong Guobao (Hong Kong) Zhou Xin

These are the results of 2023 BWF World Senior Championships' 60+ events.

== Competition schedule ==
Match was played as scheduled below.

#R	Preliminary rounds	QF	Quarter-finals	SF	Semi-finals	F	Finals

H	Hwasan Indoor Stadium	J	Jeonju Indoor Badminton Hall

Date	11 Sep		12 Sep		13 Sep		14 Sep		15 Sep	16 Sep	17 Sep
Venue	H	J	H	J	H	J	H	J	H	H	H
Men's singles	1R			2R			3R		QF	SF	F
Women's singles				1R			2R		QF	SF	F
Men's doubles	1R			2R			3R		QF	SF	F
Women's doubles				1R	2R		QF			SF	F
Mixed doubles	1R				2R		3R		QF	SF	F

== Medal summary ==
=== Medal standings ===
* Host nation (South Korea)

2023 BWF World Senior Championships medal table
Rank	Nation	Gold	Silver	Bronze	Total
1	Sweden	1.5	0	0.5	2
2	Netherlands	1	1	0	2
3	Ireland	1	0	1	2
4	Hong Kong	0.5	1	0	1.5
5	Denmark	0.5	0.5	1.5	2.5
6	China	0.5	0	0	0.5
7	Chinese Taipei	0	1	2	3
8	England	0	1	1	2
9	Indonesia	0	0.5	1	1.5
10	India	0	0	1	1
10	Japan	0	0	1	1
10	Thailand	0	0	1	1
Totals (12 entries)		5	5	10	20

=== Medalists ===
Event	Gold	Silver	Bronze
Men's singles	(Sweden) Jan-Eric Antonsson	(Chinese Taipei) Chang Wen-sung	(Denmark) Jan Bertram Petersen
Men's singles	(Sweden) Jan-Eric Antonsson	(Chinese Taipei) Chang Wen-sung	(Chinese Taipei) Wang Shun-chen
Women's singles	(Netherlands) Jeannette van der Werff	(Hong Kong) Zhou Xin	(Republic of Ireland) Sian Williams
Women's singles	(Netherlands) Jeannette van der Werff	(Hong Kong) Zhou Xin	(India) Manjusha Sahasrabudhe
Men's doubles	(Sweden) Jan-Eric Antonsson (Denmark) Jan Bertram Petersen	(Netherlands) Uun Santosa (Indonesia) Simbarsono Sutanto	(Indonesia) Bobby Ertanto (Indonesia) Effendy Widjaja
Men's doubles	(Sweden) Jan-Eric Antonsson (Denmark) Jan Bertram Petersen	(Netherlands) Uun Santosa (Indonesia) Simbarsono Sutanto	(Sweden) Per Areskär (Denmark) Per Juul
Women's doubles	(Republic of Ireland) Pamela Peard (Republic of Ireland) Sian Williams	(England) Launa Eyles (England) Kerry Mullen	(Thailand) Juthatip Banjongsilp (Thailand) Khanittha Maensamut
Women's doubles	(Republic of Ireland) Pamela Peard (Republic of Ireland) Sian Williams	(England) Launa Eyles (England) Kerry Mullen	(Japan) Hiromi Imazu (Japan) Kayoko Ueda
Mixed doubles	(China) Xiong Guobao (Hong Kong) Zhou Xin	(Denmark) Jan Bertram Petersen (Netherlands) Jeannette van der Werff	(Chinese Taipei) Wang Shun-chen (Chinese Taipei) Shyu Shuang-yuan
Mixed doubles	(China) Xiong Guobao (Hong Kong) Zhou Xin	(Denmark) Jan Bertram Petersen (Netherlands) Jeannette van der Werff	(England) Gene Austin Joyner (England) Launa Eyles

== Men's singles ==
=== Seeds ===
1. (Chinese Taipei) Chang Wen-sung (final; silver medalist)
2. (Denmark) Per Juul (third round)
3. (Germany) Klaus Buschbeck (second round)
4. (Netherlands) Rick Paap (second round)
5. (Sweden) Jan-Eric Antonsson (champion; gold medalist)
6. (India) Ram Lakhan (third round)
7. (Australia) Loke Poh Wong (third round)
8. (China) Xiong Guobao (quarter-finals)

=== Finals ===
Semi-finals
1	(Chinese Taipei) Chang Wen-sung	21	21
(Denmark) Jan Bertram Petersen	14	10
5/8	(Sweden) Jan-Eric Antonsson	21	21
(Chinese Taipei) Wang Shun-chen	13	10

Final
1	(Chinese Taipei) Chang Wen-sung	16	13
5/8	(Sweden) Jan-Eric Antonsson	21	21

=== Top half ===
==== Section 1 ====
First round
(Germany) E Boldt	4	12
(Sweden) P Areskär	21	21
(Canada) J Goldsworthy	1
(South Korea) Lee J-m	0^{r}
(England) R Leigh	15	9
(Japan) K Kawaji	21	21

Second round
1	(Chinese Taipei) Chang W-s	21	21
(South Africa) S Overkott	8	7
(France) P Noël	12	23	21
(Sweden) P Areskär	21	21	17
5/8	(China) Xiong GB	21	21
(Canada) J Goldsworthy	6	5
(India) P Hazarika	14	10
(Japan) K Kawaji	21	21

Third round
1	(Chinese Taipei) Chang W-s	21	21
(France) P Noël	10	17
5/8	(China) Xiong GB	21	21
(Japan) K Kawaji	13	5

Quarter-finals
1	(Chinese Taipei) Chang W-s	14	24	21
5/8	(China) Xiong GB	21	22	14

==== Section 2 ====
First round
(South Korea) Jin S-r
(Denmark) J B Petersen	w	/	o
(United Arab Emirates) Kamaludheen C. P.	11	16
(England) D Li	21	21
(France) J-M Edard	19	16
(Thailand) A Piyawanwadee	21	21
(Malaysia) Tan B K	19	11
(Germany) F Fiebig	21	21

Second round
3/4	(Netherlands) R Paap	10	6
(Denmark) J B Petersen	21	21
(India) A K Joshi	19	23	21
(England) D Li	21	21	12
5/8	(Australia) L P Wong	21	21
(Thailand) A Piyawanwadee	9	14
(Japan) S Inoue	21	21
(Germany) F Fiebig	8	16

Third round
(Denmark) J B Petersen	23	21
(India) A K Joshi	21	14
5/8	(Australia) L P Wong	16	13
(Japan) S Inoue	21	21

Quarter-finals
(Denmark) J B Petersen	13	21	21
(Japan) S Inoue	21	17	19

=== Bottom half ===
==== Section 3 ====
First round
(Belgium) D Hoefkens	6	15
(England) N Fell	21	21
(United States) G Stensland	21	21
(France) M Piel	7	3
(United Arab Emirates) S Kuruvilla	9	9
(India) R Bansal	21	21
(Thailand) W Chantakij	10	15
(Malaysia) Chang K L	21	21

Second round
(England) N Fell	21	21
(South Korea) Song Y-h	16	10
(United States) G Stensland	21	16	14
5/8	(Sweden) J-E Antonsson	18	21	21
(India) R Bansal	13	15
(Chinese Taipei) Huang C-c	21	21
(Malaysia) Chang K L	18	21	21
3/4	(Germany) K Buschbeck	21	16	14

Third round
(England) N Fell	12	9
5/8	(Sweden) J-E Antonsson	21	21
(Chinese Taipei) Huang C-c	21	16	18
(Malaysia) Chang K L	16	21	21

Quarter-finals
5/8	(Sweden) J-E Antonsson	21	21
(Malaysia) Chang K L	11	18

==== Section 4 ====
First round
(Switzerland) P Kaul	17	17
(Chinese Taipei) Wang S-c	21	21
(Sweden) B C Bertilson	21	18	16
(Sri Lanka) R Fernando	23	18	21
(Germany) D Steger	21	21
(South Korea) Lee J-j	16	11

Second round
(Chinese Taipei) Wang S-c	w	/	o
(England) I Hunter
(Sri Lanka) R Fernando	13	16
5/8	(India) R Lakhan	21	21
(Germany) D Steger	8	9
(Japan) H Koike	21	21
(Thailand) W Traisilpwissarut	9	14
2	(Denmark) P Juul	21	21

Third round
(Chinese Taipei) Wang S-c	23	21
5/8	(India) R Lakhan	21	16
(Japan) H Koike	21	21
2	(Denmark) P Juul	16	19

Quarter-finals
(Chinese Taipei) Wang S-c	w	/	o
(Japan) H Koike

== Women's singles ==
=== Seeds ===
1. (Hong Kong) Zhou Xin (final; silver medalist)
2. (India) Manjusha Sahasrabudhe (semi-finals; bronze medalist)
3. (Netherlands) Jeannette van der Werff (champion; gold medalist)
4. (Republic of Ireland) Sian Williams (semi-finals; bronze medalist)

=== Finals ===
Semi-finals
1	(Hong Kong) Zhou Xin	21	21
3/4	(Republic of Ireland) Sian Williams	15	15
3/4	(Netherlands) Jeannette van der Werff	21	21
2	(India) Manjusha Sahasrabudhe	11	12

Final
1	(Hong Kong) Zhou Xin	15	19
3/4	(Netherlands) Jeannette van der Werff	21	21

=== Top half ===
==== Section 1 ====
First round
(India) A Batra	11	16
(Germany) D Reiche	21	21

Second round
1	(Hong Kong) Zhou X	21	21
(England) K Mullen	6	6
(Chinese Taipei) Yu C-c	15	21	17
(Germany) D Reiche	21	18	21

Quarter-finals
1	(Hong Kong) Zhou X	21	21
(Germany) D Reiche	7	5

==== Section 2 ====
First round
(France) A Bachelard	15	7
(England) L Eyles	21	21

Second round
3/4	(Republic of Ireland) S Williams	21	21
(India) N Mahajan	2	8
(Germany) A Steger	8	8
(England) L Eyles	21	21

Quarter-finals
3/4	(Republic of Ireland) S Williams	21	21
(England) L Eyles	11	6

=== Bottom half ===
==== Section 3 ====
First round
(Thailand) P Thongmueang	21	21
(Germany) R Sommer	14	15
(England) S Tooke	21	21
(India) T Parmar	7	4

Second round
(Thailand) P Thongmueang	21	21
(Sri Lanka) L Punchihewa	14	17
(England) S Tooke	18	10
3/4	(Netherlands) J van der Werff	21	21

Quarter-finals
(Thailand) P Thongmueang	10	10
3/4	(Netherlands) J van der Werff	21	21

==== Section 4 ====
First round
(France) V Ruche	9	7
(Japan) C Ishiwata	21	21

Second round
(Japan) C Ishiwata	21	21
(Germany) C Fiebig	6	9
(England) S Sheen	9	9
2	(India) M Sahasrabudhe	21	21

Quarter-finals
(Japan) C Ishiwata	18	10
2	(India) M Sahasrabudhe	21	21

== Men's doubles ==
=== Seeds ===
1. (Sweden) Jan-Eric Antonsson / (Denmark) Jan Bertram Petersen (champion; gold medalists)
2. (Sweden) Per Areskär / (Denmark) Per Juul (semi-finals; bronze medalists)
3. (Thailand) Worapoj Chantakij / Nattapol Sanlekanun (quarter-finals)
4. (England) Nigel Fell / Ian Hunter (quarter-finals)
5. (Canada) Jeff Goldsworthy / Keith Priestman (quarter-finals)
6. (Indonesia) Bobby Ertanto / Effendy Widjaja (semi-finals; bronze medalists)
7. (Belgium) Daniel Hoefkens / (United States) Geoffrey Stensland (quarter-finals)
8. (Netherlands) Uun Santosa / (Indonesia) Simbarsono Sutanto (final; silver medalists)

=== Finals ===
Semi-finals
1	(Sweden) Jan-Eric Antonsson (Denmark) Jan Bertram Petersen	17	21	21
5/8	(Indonesia) Bobby Ertanto (Indonesia) Effendy Widjaja	21	18	15
5/8	(Netherlands) Uun Santosa (Indonesia) Simbarsono Sutanto	22	21
2	(Sweden) Per Areskär (Denmark) Per Juul	20	15

Final
1	(Sweden) Jan-Eric Antonsson (Denmark) Jan Bertram Petersen	21	15	21
5/8	(Netherlands) Uun Santosa (Indonesia) Simbarsono Sutanto	12	21	9

=== Top half ===
==== Section 1 ====
First round

Second round
1	(Sweden) J-E Antonsson (Denmark) J B Petersen	21	21
(England) G A Joyner (England) R Leigh	17	12
(South Korea) Jin S-r (South Korea) Song Y-h
(Thailand) B Devakula (Chinese Taipei) Wang S-c	w	/	o
5/8	(Belgium) D Hoefkens (United States) G Stensland	14	22	21
(Chinese Taipei) Huang C-c (Chinese Taipei) Lee C-y	21	20	17
(India) A Kumar (India) R Lakhan	21	21
(Denmark) P F Nielsen (Netherlands) R Paap	16	18

Third round
1	(Sweden) J-E Antonsson (Denmark) J B Petersen	21	17	22
(Thailand) B Devakula (Chinese Taipei) Wang S-c	14	21	20
5/8	(Belgium) D Hoefkens (United States) G Stensland	21	21
(India) A Kumar (India) R Lakhan	4	19

Quarter-finals
1	(Sweden) J-E Antonsson (Denmark) J B Petersen	21	21
5/8	(Belgium) D Hoefkens (United States) G Stensland	12	10

==== Section 2 ====
First round
(South Korea) Kim Y-h (South Korea) Yu S-j	11	18
(Japan) T Koizumi (Japan) F Konishi	21	21

Second round
3/4	(Thailand) W Chantakij (Thailand) N Sanlekanun	21	21
(India) J Matha (India) B S Pai	11	13
(Germany) E Boldt (Germany) W Groll	11	9
(Malaysia) Ong C H (Malaysia) Tan B K	21	21
5/8	(Indonesia) B Ertanto (Indonesia) E Widjaja	21	21
(England) S Chung (England) D Li	8	8
(Sri Lanka) R Fernando (Indonesia) Sumardjo	17	15
(Japan) T Koizumi (Japan) F Konishi	21	21

Third round
3/4	(Thailand) W Chantakij (Thailand) N Sanlekanun	21	21
(Malaysia) Ong C H (Malaysia) Tan B K	14	15
5/8	(Indonesia) B Ertanto (Indonesia) E Widjaja	21	21
(Japan) T Koizumi (Japan) F Konishi	18	11

Quarter-finals
3/4	(Thailand) W Chantakij (Thailand) N Sanlekanun	7	14
5/8	(Indonesia) B Ertanto (Indonesia) E Widjaja	21	21

=== Bottom half ===
==== Section 3 ====
First round
(Japan) S Inoue (Japan) K Kawaji	24	17	21
(Singapore) Foo K F (Singapore) Tan K H	22	21	9

Second round
(Japan) S Inoue (Japan) K Kawaji	21	21
SUB	(India) B Chatterjee (India) P Hazarika	19	18
(South Korea) Kim R (South Korea) Lim H-j	8	7
5/8	(Netherlands) U Santosa (Indonesia) S Sutanto	21	21
(Thailand) A Piyawanwadee (Thailand) W Traisilpwissarut	21	18	16
(United Arab Emirates) Kamaludheen C. P. (United Arab Emirates) S Kuruvilla	13	21	21
(Indonesia) B Buasan (Indonesia) O Maslim	13	12
3/4	(England) N Fell (England) I Hunter	21	21

Third round
(Japan) S Inoue (Japan) K Kawaji	19	15
5/8	(Netherlands) U Santosa (Indonesia) S Sutanto	21	21
(United Arab Emirates) Kamaludheen C. P. (United Arab Emirates) S Kuruvilla	19	15
3/4	(England) N Fell (England) I Hunter	21	21

Quarter-finals
5/8	(Netherlands) U Santosa (Indonesia) S Sutanto	21	21
3/4	(England) N Fell (England) I Hunter	7	18

==== Section 4 ====
First round

Second round
(India) R Mehta (India) P Taneja	21	21
(France) J-M Edard (Germany) F Fiebig	19	16
(South Korea) Hong S-g (South Korea) Yang S-h	21	16	7
5/8	(Canada) J Goldsworthy (Canada) K Priestman	17	21	21
(Thailand) C Jarutawai (Thailand) S Poebaikul	18	18
(France) P Noël (France) M Piel	21	21
(Indonesia) A J Saputra (Indonesia) N H Soehindro	15	21	14
2	(Sweden) P Areskär (Denmark) P Juul	21	17	21

Third round
(India) R Mehta (India) P Taneja	11	14
5/8	(Canada) J Goldsworthy (Canada) K Priestman	21	21
(France) P Noël (France) M Piel	17	21
2	(Sweden) P Areskär (Denmark) P Juul	21	23

Quarter-finals
5/8	(Canada) J Goldsworthy (Canada) K Priestman	18	15
2	(Sweden) P Areskär (Denmark) P Juul	21	21

== Women's doubles ==
=== Seeds ===
1. (England) Launa Eyles / Kerry Mullen (final; silver medalists)
2. (Republic of Ireland) Pamela Peard / Sian Williams (champions; gold medalists)
3. (Germany) Doris Reiche / Regina Sommer (quarter-finals)
4. (England) Sue Sheen / Susan Tooke (second round)

=== Finals ===
Semi-finals
1	(England) Launa Eyles (England) Kerry Mullen	21	21
(Thailand) Juthatip Banjongsilp (Thailand) Khanittha Maensamut	13	14
(Japan) Hiromi Imazu (Japan) Kayoko Ueda	22	21	18
2	(Republic of Ireland) Pamela Peard (Republic of Ireland) Sian Williams	24	10	21

Final
1	(England) Launa Eyles (England) Kerry Mullen	7	11
2	(Republic of Ireland) Pamela Peard (Republic of Ireland) Sian Williams	21	21

=== Top half ===
==== Section 1 ====
First round

Second round
1	(England) L Eyles (England) K Mullen	21	21
(South Korea) Ki S-a (South Korea) Lee H-k	6	13
(Chinese Taipei) Lee M-y (Chinese Taipei) Yu C-c	w	/	o
(India) T Parmar (India) B Shetty

Quarter-finals
1	(England) L Eyles (England) K Mullen	21	21
(Chinese Taipei) Lee M-y (Chinese Taipei) Yu C-c	14	11

==== Section 2 ====
First round
(Thailand) J Banjongsilp (Thailand) K Maensamut	20	21	21
(England) M Dew (England) K M. Spillane	22	11	7

Second round
3/4	(Germany) D Reiche (Germany) R Sommer	w	/	o
(South Korea) Choi S-d (South Korea) Song Y-s
(India) M Khandeparker (India) S Swaminathan	21	21
(Thailand) J Banjongsilp (Thailand) K Maensamut	15	17

Quarter-finals
3/4	(Germany) D Reiche (Germany) R Sommer	21	11	17
(Thailand) J Banjongsilp (Thailand) K Maensamut	13	21	21

=== Bottom half ===
==== Section 3 ====
First round
(France) A Legrais-Ozberk (France) V Ruche	23	21
(South Korea) Kim Y-s (South Korea) Kim Y-s	21	18

Second round
(France) A Legrais-Ozberk (France) V Ruche	14	22	21
(India) A Batra (India) R Lohiya	21	20	17
(Japan) H Imazu (Japan) K Ueda	21	21
3/4	(England) S Sheen (England) S Tooke	12	7

Quarter-finals
(France) A Legrais-Ozberk (France) V Ruche	2	5
(Japan) H Imazu (Japan) K Ueda	21	21

==== Section 4 ====
First round

Second round
(Chinese Taipei) Liou S-c (Chinese Taipei) Shyu S-y	21	21
(South Korea) Choi K (South Korea) Kim Y-j	19	6
(India) A Nagendra (India) P Tandon	14	15
2	(Republic of Ireland) P Peard (Republic of Ireland) S Williams	21	21

Quarter-finals
(Chinese Taipei) Liou S-c (Chinese Taipei) Shyu S-y	14	15
2	(Republic of Ireland) P Peard (Republic of Ireland) S Williams	21	21

== Mixed doubles ==
=== Seeds ===
1. (Denmark) Jan Bertram Petersen / (Netherlands) Jeannette van der Werff (final; silver medalists)
2. (England) Gene Austin Joyner / Launa Eyles (semi-finals; bronze medalists)
3. (Germany) Klaus Buschbeck / Regina Sommer (quarter-finals)
4. (United States) Geoffrey Stensland / (Republic of Ireland) Pamela Peard (third round)
5. (Chinese Taipei) Chang Wen-sung / Lee Mei-ying (quarter-finals)
6. (England) Nigel Fell / Kerry Mullen (third round)
7. (India) Ram Lakhan / Manjusha Sahasrabudhe (quarter-finals)
8. (China) Xiong Guobao / (Hong Kong) Zhou Xin (champion; gold medalists)

=== Finals ===
Semi-finals
1	(Denmark) Jan Bertram Petersen (Netherlands) Jeannette van der Werff	19	21	21
(Chinese Taipei) Wang Shun-chen (Chinese Taipei) Shyu Shuang-yuan	21	19	16
5/8	(China) Xiong Guobao (Hong Kong) Zhou Xin	21	21
2	(England) Gene Austin Joyner (England) Launa Eyles	9	9

Final
1	(Denmark) Jan Bertram Petersen (Netherlands) Jeannette van der Werff	21	15	18
5/8	(China) Xiong Guobao (Hong Kong) Zhou Xin	14	21	21

=== Top half ===
==== Section 1 ====
First round
(India) B S Pai (India) A Nagendra	9	14
(England) I Hunter (England) L Pearcy	21	21

Second round
1	(Denmark) J B Petersen (Netherlands) J van der Werff	21	21
(Malaysia) Tan B K (China) Chen HQ	11	3
(Thailand) N Sanlekanun (Thailand) K Maensamut	21	21
(Germany) D Steger (Germany) A Steger	12	19
5/8	(Chinese Taipei) Chang W-s (Chinese Taipei) Lee M-y	21	21
(South Korea) Moon H-c (South Korea) Jo G-s	8	7
(Japan) T Koizumi (Japan) H Imazu	23	17
(England) I Hunter (England) L Pearcy	25	21

Third round
1	(Denmark) J B Petersen (Netherlands) J van der Werff	21	21
(Thailand) N Sanlekanun (Thailand) K Maensamut	15	10
5/8	(Chinese Taipei) Chang W-s (Chinese Taipei) Lee M-y	21	21
(England) I Hunter (England) L Pearcy	4	11

Quarter-finals
1	(Denmark) J B Petersen (Netherlands) J van der Werff	21	19	21
5/8	(Chinese Taipei) Chang W-s (Chinese Taipei) Lee M-y	15	21	18

==== Section 2 ====
First round
(Thailand) M Gumlaitong (Thailand) D Bunnag	18	22	19
(Chinese Taipei) Wang S-c (Chinese Taipei) Shyu S-y	21	20	21

Second round
3/4	(Germany) K Buschbeck (Germany) R Sommer	21	23
(Japan) S Shinohara (Japan) M Umezawa	14	21
(India) P C Tewari (India) R Dhupar	15	13
(Singapore) V Sim (Singapore) N Ong	21	21
5/8	(England) N Fell (England) K Mullen	21	24
(France) P Noël (France) A Legrais-Ozberk	8	22
(South Korea) Kim K-s (South Korea) Choi Y-j	6	7
(Chinese Taipei) Wang S-c (Chinese Taipei) Shyu S-y	21	21

Third round
3/4	(Germany) K Buschbeck (Germany) R Sommer	19	21	21
(Singapore) V Sim (Singapore) N Ong	21	5	8
5/8	(England) N Fell (England) K Mullen	18	21	14
(Chinese Taipei) Wang S-c (Chinese Taipei) Shyu S-y	21	14	21

Quarter-finals
3/4	(Germany) K Buschbeck (Germany) R Sommer	14	13
(Chinese Taipei) Wang S-c (Chinese Taipei) Shyu S-y	21	21

=== Bottom half ===
==== Section 3 ====
First round
(Chinese Taipei) Lee C-y (Chinese Taipei) Ho Y-s	21	21
(Germany) E Boldt (Germany) D Reiche	8	12
(France) M Piel (France) A Bachelard	15	14
(England) J Kindred (England) M Dew	21	21

Second round
(Chinese Taipei) Lee C-y (Chinese Taipei) Ho Y-s	21	21
(India) R N Sarkar (India) N Bhattacharjee	7	8
(Thailand) W Chantakij (Thailand) S Chantakit	12	8
5/8	(China) Xiong GB (Hong Kong) Zhou X	21	21
(England) J Kindred (England) M Dew	19	10
(Japan) F Konishi (Japan) C Ishiwata	21	21
(South Korea) Park B-u (South Korea) Kim H-j	2	11
3/4	(United States) G Stensland (Republic of Ireland) P Peard	21	21

Third round
(Chinese Taipei) Lee C-y (Chinese Taipei) Ho Y-s	9	7
5/8	(China) Xiong GB (Hong Kong) Zhou X	21	21
(Japan) F Konishi (Japan) C Ishiwata	21	11	21
3/4	(United States) G Stensland (Republic of Ireland) P Peard	19	21	15

Quarter-finals
5/8	(China) Xiong GB (Hong Kong) Zhou X	21	21
(Japan) F Konishi (Japan) C Ishiwata	12	2

==== Section 4 ====
First round
(France) J-M Edard (France) V Ruche	11	12
(Japan) S Inoue (Japan) M Sato	21	21

Second round
(Japan) S Inoue (Japan) M Sato	21	21
(Thailand) B Devakula (Thailand) P Wattananan	12	14
(South Korea) Kang S-c (South Korea) Kang B-j	10	6
5/8	(India) R Lakhan (India) M Sahasrabudhe	21	21
(Chinese Taipei) Huang C-c (Chinese Taipei) Liou S-c	21	21
(Switzerland) P Dodd (Switzerland) I Stucker	7	8
(Germany) F Fiebig (Germany) C Fiebig	11	12
2	(England) G A Joyner (England) L Eyles	21	21

Third round
(Japan) S Inoue (Japan) M Sato	17	21	15
5/8	(India) R Lakhan (India) M Sahasrabudhe	21	13	21
(Chinese Taipei) Huang C-c (Chinese Taipei) Liou S-c	10	12
2	(England) G A Joyner (England) L Eyles	21	21

Quarter-finals
5/8	(India) R Lakhan (India) M Sahasrabudhe	20	21	11
2	(England) G A Joyner (England) L Eyles	22	19	21
