= Aryono Miranat =

Indonesian badminton player (born 1964)

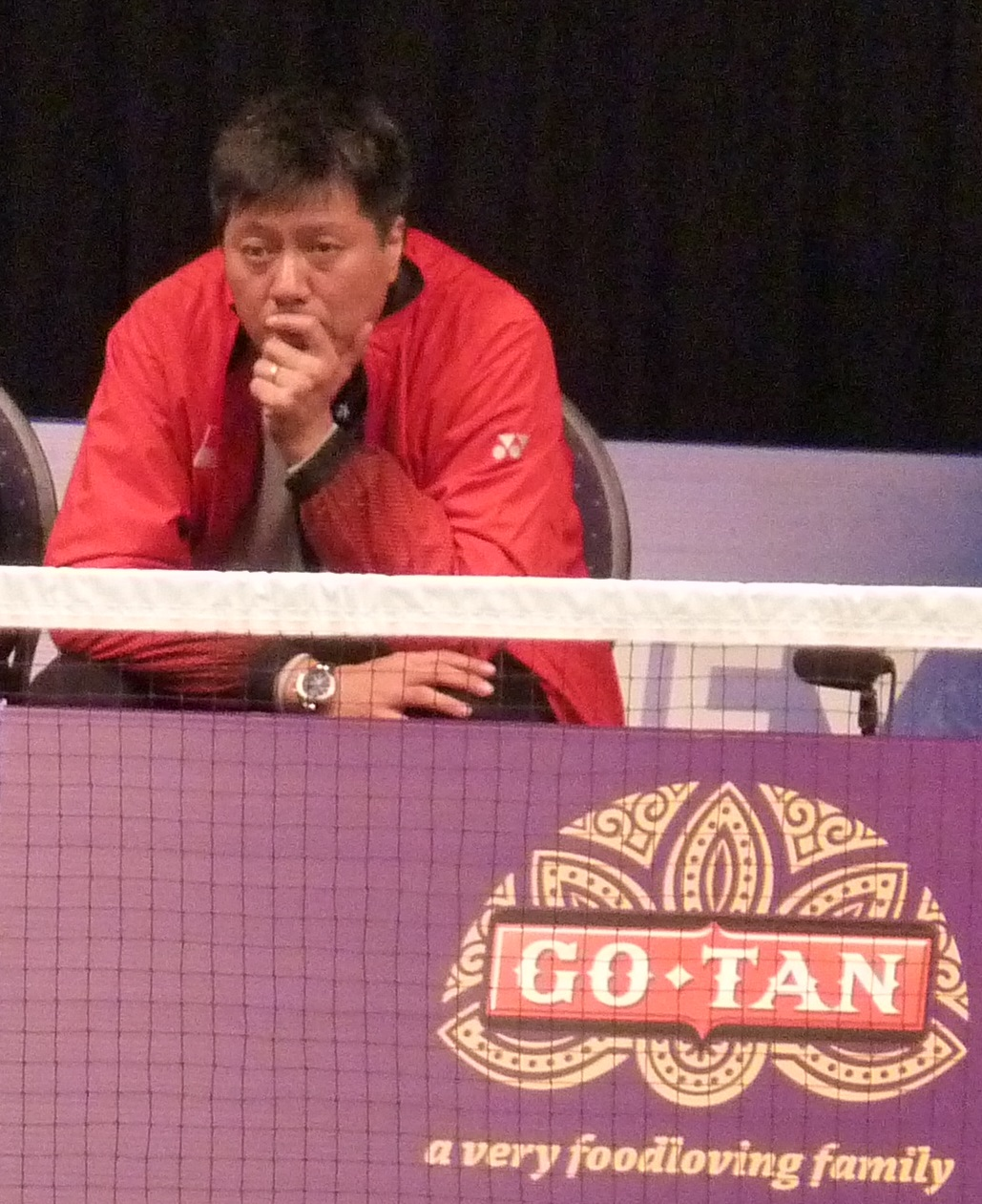

Personal information
- Born: 27 April 1964 (age 62) Bandung, West Java, Indonesia

Sport
- Country: Indonesia
- Sport: Badminton
- Handedness: Right
- Event: Mixed doubles

Mixed doubles
- BWF profile
Medal record
Men's badminton
Representing Indonesia
World Championships
Bronze medal – third place	1993 Birmingham	Mixed doubles
World Cup
Silver medal – second place	1993 New Delhi	Mixed doubles
Bronze medal – third place	1990 Bandung-Jakarta	Mixed doubles
Bronze medal – third place	1994 Ho Chi Minh	Mixed doubles
Sudirman Cup
Gold medal – first place	1989 Jakarta	Mixed team
Silver medal – second place	1993 Birmingham	Mixed team
Silver medal – second place	1995 Lausanne	Mixed team
Asian Games
Bronze medal – third place	1990 Beijing	Men's team
Asian Championships
Silver medal – second place	1989 Shanghai	Men's team
Asian Cup
Silver medal – second place	1991 Jakarta	Mixed doubles
Silver medal – second place	1994 Beijing	Mixed doubles
SEA Games
Silver medal – second place	1989 Kuala Lumpur	Mixed doubles
Silver medal – second place	1989 Kuala Lumpur	Men's team
Bronze medal – third place	1989 Kuala Lumpur	Men's doubles

Aryono Miranat (born 27 April 1964) is a retired badminton player from Indonesia who specialized in mixed doubles. After his retirement he became a badminton trainer at PB Djarum in Kudus. As of 29 December 2007, he is a coach in the men's doubles category for the Indonesian badminton association (PBSI). He is currently the Indonesia national team men's doubles head coach.

== Career ==
Miranat competed at the 1989 SEA Games in Kuala Lumpur, won two silver medals in the mixed doubles and team events, also a bronze in the men's doubles. He was part of the Indonesia winning team at the 1989 Sudirman Cup, helping the team defeat South Korea in group 1A, where he played in the mixed doubles with Minarti Timur by beating Park Joo-bong and Chung Myung-hee in straight games.

Miranat won several international titles in the early 1990s with Eliza Nathanael, including the China (1992), Thailand (1992), Hong Kong (1992), and French (1993) Opens. He was a mixed doubles runner-up three consecutive years (1990–1992) at the Indonesia Open. He was also runner-up at the 1993 Hong Kong Open with Risyeu Rosalina. Miranat earned a bronze medal with Nathanael at the 1993 IBF World Championships in Birmingham, England. He was also part of the Indonesian Men's team that earned a bronze medal at the 1990 Asian Games in Beijing, China.

After retiring, he chose to become a badminton coach. Before becoming a male doubles assistant coach at PBSI, he was first trusted to handle the women's doubles sector in the Indonesian national training center at Cipayung. At his coaching hand the formation of the pair Vita Marissa and Liliyana Natsir was initiated, who were able to penetrate the women doubles dominance of China at that time.

As a coach, expressing his normal calm figure, he is usually called "Koh Ar" by his students. He already has numerous achievements as a national coach for PBSI including the gold medal earned by the Indonesian men's badminton team at the 2003 Southeast Asian Games and many individual doubles titles.

== Achievements ==
=== World Championships ===
Mixed doubles
Year	Venue	Partner	Opponent	Score	Result
1993	National Indoor Arena, Birmingham, England	(Indonesia) Eliza Nathanael	(Denmark) Jon Holst-Christensen (Denmark) Grete Mogensen	5–15, 4–15	Bronze

=== World Cup ===
Mixed doubles
Year	Venue	Partner	Opponent	Score	Result
1994	Phan Đình Phùng Indoor Stadium; Ho Chi Minh City, Vietnam	(Indonesia) Rosalina Riseu	(China) Chen Xingdong (China) Gu Jun	10–15, 6–15	Bronze
1993	Indira Gandhi Arena; New Delhi, India	(Indonesia) Eliza Nathanael	(Sweden) Peter Axelsson (England) Gillian Gowers	15–10, 7–15, 5–15	Silver
1990	Istora Senayan, Jakarta, Indonesia	(Indonesia) Erma Sulistianingsih	(Denmark) Jan Paulsen (England) Gillian Gowers	8–15, 4–15	Bronze

=== Asian Cup ===
Mixed doubles
Year	Venue	Partner	Opponent	Score	Result
1991	Istora Senayan, Jakarta, Indonesia	(Indonesia) Eliza Nathanael	(South Korea) Shon Jin-hwan (South Korea) Gil Young-ah	5–15, 15–8, 7–15	Silver
1994	Beijing Gymnasium, Beijing, China	(Indonesia) Eliza Nathanael	(China) Liu Jianjun (China) Ge Fei	4–15, 15–13, 10–15	Silver

=== SEA Games ===
Mixed doubles
Year	Venue	Partner	Opponent	Score	Result
1989	Stadium Negara; Kuala Lumpur, Malaysia	(Indonesia) Minarti Timur	(Indonesia) Eddy Hartono (Indonesia) Verawaty Fadjrin	17–16, 9–15, 2–15	Silver

=== IBF World Grand Prix ===
The World Badminton Grand Prix sanctioned by International Badminton Federation (IBF) since 1983.

Mixed doubles
Year	Tournament	Partner	Opponent	Score	Result
1993	Hong Kong Open	(Indonesia) Rosalina Riseu	(Indonesia) Rudy Gunawan (Indonesia) Rosiana Tendean	12–15, 6–15	(silver) Runner-up
1993	French Open	(Indonesia) Eliza Nathanael	(Indonesia) Rudy Gunawan (Indonesia) Rosiana Tendean	15–7, 15–12	(gold) Winner
1992	Thailand Open	(Indonesia) Eliza Nathanael	(Indonesia) Denny Kantono (Indonesia) Zelin Resiana	15–2, 2–15, 15–1	(gold) Winner
1992	Hong Kong Open	(Indonesia) Eliza Nathanael	(South Korea) Lee Sang-bok (South Korea) Gil Young-ah	4–15, 1–15	(silver) Runner-up
1992	China Open	(Indonesia) Eliza Nathanael	(China) Chen Xingdong (China) Sun Man	15–8, 9–15, 17–16	(gold) Winner
1992	Indonesia Open	(Indonesia) Eliza Nathanael	(Sweden) Pär-Gunnar Jönsson (Sweden) Maria Bengtsson	12–15, 15–11, 9–15	(silver) Runner-up
1991	Indonesia Open	(Indonesia) Eliza Nathanael	(Denmark) Thomas Lund (Denmark) Pernille Dupont	11–15, 9–15	(silver) Runner-up
1990	Indonesia Open	(Indonesia) Erma Sulistianingsih	(Indonesia) Rudy Gunawan (Indonesia) Rosiana Tendean	5–15, 15–11, 4–15	(silver) Runner-up

IBF Grand Prix tournament
IBF Grand Prix Finals tournament

=== Invitational tournament ===
Men's doubles
Year	Tournament	Partner	Opponent	Score	Result
1988	Asian Invitational Championships; Bandar Lampung, Indonesia	(Indonesia) Joko Suprianto	(South Korea) Lee Sang-bok (South Korea) Park Joo-bong	8–15, 0–15	Bronze
