= China Open (badminton) =

Annual badminton tournament held in China

- Official website
- Founded: 1986; 40 years ago
- Editions: 35 (2026)
- Location: Changzhou (2026); China
- Venue: Changzhou Olympic Sports Centre Xincheng Gymnasium (2026)
- Prize money: USD2 million (2026)

Men's
- Draw: 32S / 32D
- Current champions: Chou Tien-chen (singles); Fajar Alfian; Muhammad Shohibul Fikri (doubles)
- Most singles titles: 5 Lin Dan
- Most doubles titles: 5 Lee Yong-dae

Women's
- Draw: 32S / 32D
- Current champions: Akane Yamaguchi (singles); Liu Shengshu; Tan Ning (doubles)
- Most singles titles: 3 Zhou Mi; Zhang Ning; Jiang Yanjiao; Li Xuerui
- Most doubles titles: 5 Yu Yang

Mixed doubles
- Draw: 32
- Current champions: Guo Xinwa; Chen Fanghui
- Most titles (male): 3 Zhang Nan; Chen Xingdong; Zheng Siwei
- Most titles (female): 3 Zhao Yunlei; Liliyana Natsir; Huang Yaqiong

Super 1000
- All England Open; China Open; Indonesia Open; Malaysia Open

Last completed
- 2026 China Open

The China Open (Chinese: 中国羽毛球公开赛) is an annual badminton tournament held in People's Republic of China. It became part of the BWF Super Series tournaments in 2007. BWF categorised China Open as one of the three BWF World Tour Super 1000 events in the BWF events structure since 2018.

== Locations ==
Twelve cities have been chosen to host the tournament.

- 1986, 2014–2017: Fuzhou
- 1987: Nanjing
- 1988, 1992, 1997, 2008–2013: Shanghai
- 1989, 1991: Foshan
- 1993: Hangzhou
- 1994: Dalian
- 1995, 2027–2030: Chengdu
- 1996: Dongguan
- 1999: Beijing
- 2001: Ningbo
- 2002–2007: Guangzhou
- 2018–2019, 2023–2026: Changzhou
Locations of China Open host cities

== Past winners ==
Year	Men's singles	Women's singles	Men's doubles	Women's doubles	Mixed doubles
1986	(Indonesia) Icuk Sugiarto	(China) Han Aiping	(China) Li Yongbo (China) Tian Bingyi	(Indonesia) Ivana Lie (Indonesia) Verawaty Wiharjo	(South Korea) Park Joo-bong (South Korea) Chung Myung-hee
1987	(China) Zhao Jianhua	(China) Li Lingwei	(China) Li Yongbo (China) Tian Bingyi	(China) Guan Weizhen (China) Lin Ying	(China) Zhou Jincan (China) Lin Ying
1988	(China) Zhao Jianhua	(China) Li Lingwei	(China) Li Yongbo (China) Tian Bingyi	(China) Guan Weizhen (China) Lin Ying	(South Korea) Park Joo-bong (South Korea) Chung Myung-hee
1989	(Indonesia) Ardy Wiranata	(China) Tang Jiuhong	(Malaysia) Jalani Sidek (Malaysia) Razif Sidek	(China) Guan Weizhen (China) Lin Ying	(South Korea) Kim Hak-kyun (South Korea) Hwang Hye-young
1990	No competition				
1991	(Indonesia) Alan Budikusuma	(China) Huang Hua	(China) Li Yongbo (China) Tian Bingyi	(South Korea) Chung Myung-hee (South Korea) Hwang Hye-young	(China) Liu Jianjun (China) Wang Xiaoyuan
1992	(Indonesia) Hermawan Susanto	(China) Yao Yan	(Indonesia) Rexy Mainaky (Indonesia) Ricky Subagja	(China) Lin Yanfen (China) Yao Fen	(Indonesia) Aryono Miranat (Indonesia) Eliza Nathanael
1993	(Indonesia) Joko Suprianto	(China) Han Jingna	(Indonesia) Rudy Gunawan (Indonesia) Bambang Suprianto	(China) Chen Ying (China) Wu Yuhong	(China) Chen Xingdong (China) Sun Man
1994	(Indonesia) Alan Budikusuma	(South Korea) Bang Soo-hyun	(China) Huang Zhanzhong (China) Jiang Xin	(China) Ge Fei (China) Gu Jun	(Denmark) Thomas Lund (Denmark) Marlene Thomsen
1995	(China) Dong Jiong	(China) Ye Zhaoying	(China) Huang Zhanzhong (China) Jiang Xin	(China) Ge Fei (China) Gu Jun	(China) Chen Xingdong (China) Peng Xinyong
1996	(Chinese Taipei) Fung Permadi	(China) Zhang Ning	(Indonesia) Sigit Budiarto (Indonesia) Candra Wijaya	(China) Qin Yiyuan (China) Tang Yongshu	(China) Chen Xingdong (China) Peng Xinyong
1997	(China) Dong Jiong	(China) Gong Zhichao	(China) Ge Cheng (China) Tao Xiaoqiang	(China) Ge Fei (China) Gu Jun	(South Korea) Kim Dong-moon (South Korea) Ra Kyung-min
1998	No competition				
1999	(China) Dong Jiong	(China) Zhou Mi	(South Korea) Ha Tae-kwon (South Korea) Kim Dong-moon	(China) Ge Fei (China) Gu Jun	(China) Liu Yong (China) Ge Fei
2000	No competition				
2001	(China) Xia Xuanze	(China) Zhou Mi	(China) Zhang Jun (China) Zhang Wei	(China) Wei Yili (China) Zhang Jiewen	(China) Liu Yong (China) Chen Lin
2002	(Malaysia) Wong Choong Hann	(China) Gong Ruina	(Thailand) Tesana Panvisvas (Thailand) Pramote Teerawiwatana	(China) Gao Ling (China) Huang Sui	(China) Zhang Jun (China) Gao Ling
2003	(China) Lin Dan	(China) Zhou Mi	(Denmark) Lars Paaske (Denmark) Jonas Rasmussen	(China) Gao Ling (China) Huang Sui	(China) Zhang Jun (China) Gao Ling
2004	(China) Lin Dan	(China) Xie Xingfang	(Indonesia) Sigit Budiarto (Indonesia) Candra Wijaya	(China) Yang Wei (China) Zhang Jiewen	(Denmark) Jens Eriksen (Denmark) Mette Schjoldager
2005	(China) Chen Hong	(China) Zhang Ning	(Indonesia) Sigit Budiarto (Indonesia) Candra Wijaya	(China) Yang Wei (China) Zhang Jiewen	(England) Nathan Robertson (England) Gail Emms
2006	(China) Chen Hong	(China) Zhang Ning	(Indonesia) Markis Kido (Indonesia) Hendra Setiawan	(China) Yang Wei (China) Zhang Jiewen	(China) Xie Zhongbo (China) Zhang Yawen
2007	(China) Bao Chunlai	(Malaysia) Wong Mew Choo	(Indonesia) Markis Kido (Indonesia) Hendra Setiawan	(China) Gao Ling (China) Zhao Tingting	(Indonesia) Nova Widianto (Indonesia) Liliyana Natsir
2008	(China) Lin Dan	(China) Jiang Yanjiao	(South Korea) Jung Jae-sung (South Korea) Lee Yong-dae	(China) Zhang Yawen (China) Zhao Tingting	(South Korea) Lee Yong-dae (South Korea) Lee Hyo-jung
2009	(China) Lin Dan	(China) Jiang Yanjiao	(South Korea) Jung Jae-sung (South Korea) Lee Yong-dae	(China) Tian Qing (China) Zhang Yawen	(South Korea) Lee Yong-dae (South Korea) Lee Hyo-jung
2010	(China) Chen Long	(China) Jiang Yanjiao	(South Korea) Jung Jae-sung (South Korea) Lee Yong-dae	(China) Cheng Shu (China) Zhao Yunlei	(China) Tao Jiaming (China) Tian Qing
2011	(China) Lin Dan	(China) Wang Yihan	(Denmark) Mathias Boe (Denmark) Carsten Mogensen	(China) Wang Xiaoli (China) Yu Yang	(China) Zhang Nan (China) Zhao Yunlei
2012	(China) Chen Long	(China) Li Xuerui	(Denmark) Mathias Boe (Denmark) Carsten Mogensen	(China) Wang Xiaoli (China) Yu Yang	(China) Xu Chen (China) Ma Jin
2013	(China) Chen Long	(China) Li Xuerui	(South Korea) Lee Yong-dae (South Korea) Yoo Yeon-seong	(China) Wang Xiaoli (China) Yu Yang	(Indonesia) Tontowi Ahmad (Indonesia) Liliyana Natsir
2014	(India) Srikanth Kidambi	(India) Saina Nehwal	(South Korea) Lee Yong-dae (South Korea) Yoo Yeon-seong	(China) Wang Xiaoli (China) Yu Yang	(China) Zhang Nan (China) Zhao Yunlei
2015	(Malaysia) Lee Chong Wei	(China) Li Xuerui	(South Korea) Kim Gi-jung (South Korea) Kim Sa-rang	(China) Tang Yuanting (China) Yu Yang	(China) Zhang Nan (China) Zhao Yunlei
2016	(Denmark) Jan Ø. Jørgensen	(India) P. V. Sindhu	(Indonesia) Marcus Fernaldi Gideon (Indonesia) Kevin Sanjaya Sukamuljo	(South Korea) Chang Ye-na (South Korea) Lee So-hee	(Indonesia) Tontowi Ahmad (Indonesia) Liliyana Natsir
2017	(China) Chen Long	(Japan) Akane Yamaguchi	(Indonesia) Marcus Fernaldi Gideon (Indonesia) Kevin Sanjaya Sukamuljo	(China) Chen Qingchen (China) Jia Yifan	(China) Zheng Siwei (China) Huang Yaqiong
2018	(Indonesia) Anthony Sinisuka Ginting	(Spain) Carolina Marín	(Denmark) Kim Astrup (Denmark) Anders Skaarup Rasmussen	(Japan) Misaki Matsutomo (Japan) Ayaka Takahashi	(China) Zheng Siwei (China) Huang Yaqiong
2019	(Japan) Kento Momota	(Spain) Carolina Marín	(Indonesia) Marcus Fernaldi Gideon (Indonesia) Kevin Sanjaya Sukamuljo	(China) Chen Qingchen (China) Jia Yifan	(China) Zheng Siwei (China) Huang Yaqiong
2020	Cancelled (Note: This tournament, originally to be played from 15 to 20 September, was later postponed due to COVID-19 pandemic in Mainland China.)				
2021	Cancelled (Note: This tournament, originally to be played from 21 to 26 September, was later cancelled due to COVID-19 pandemic in Mainland China.)				
2022	Cancelled (Note: This tournament, originally to be played from 29 November to 4 December, was later cancelled due to COVID-19 pandemic in Mainland China.)				
2023	(Denmark) Viktor Axelsen	(South Korea) An Se-young	(China) Liang Weikeng (China) Wang Chang	(China) Chen Qingchen (China) Jia Yifan	(South Korea) Seo Seung-jae (South Korea) Chae Yoo-jung
2024	(China) Weng Hongyang	(China) Wang Zhiyi	(Malaysia) Goh Sze Fei (Malaysia) Nur Izzuddin	(China) Li Yijing (China) Luo Xumin	(China) Feng Yanzhe (China) Huang Dongping
2025	(China) Shi Yuqi	(China) Wang Zhiyi	(Indonesia) Fajar Alfian (Indonesia) Muhammad Shohibul Fikri	(China) Liu Shengshu (China) Tan Ning	(China) Feng Yanzhe (China) Huang Dongping
2026	(Chinese Taipei) Chou Tien-chen	(Japan) Akane Yamaguchi	(Indonesia) Fajar Alfian (Indonesia) Muhammad Shohibul Fikri	(China) Liu Shengshu (China) Tan Ning	(China) Guo Xinwa (China) Chen Fanghui

== Multiple winners ==
Below is the list of the most successful players in the China Open:

Name	MS	WS	MD	WD	XD	Total
(South Korea) Lee Yong-dae			5		2	7
(China) Ge Fei				4	1	5
(China) Gao Ling				3	2	5
(China) Lin Dan	5					5
(China) Yu Yang				5		5
(China) Lin Ying				3	1	4
(China) Li Yongbo			4			4
(China) Tian Bingyi			4			4
(China) Gu Jun				4		4
(China) Zhang Jiewen				4		4
(China) Wang Xiaoli				4		4
(China) Zhao Yunlei				1	3	4
(China) Chen Long	4					4
(China) Guan Weizhen				3		3
(South Korea) Chung Myung-hee				1	2	3
(China) Chen Xingdong					3	3
(China) Dong Jiong	3					3
(Indonesia) Sigit Budiarto			3			3
(Indonesia) Candra Wijaya			3			3
(China) Zhang Ning		3				3
(China) Zhou Mi		3				3
(China) Zhang Jun			1		2	3
(China) Yang Wei				3		3
(China) Zhang Yawen				2	1	3
(China) Jiang Yanjiao		3				3
(South Korea) Jung Jae-sung			3			3
(China) Li Xuerui		3				3
(China) Zhang Nan					3	3
(Indonesia) Liliyana Natsir					3	3
(Indonesia) Marcus Fernaldi Gideon			3			3
(Indonesia) Kevin Sanjaya Sukamuljo			3			3
(China) Zheng Siwei					3	3
(China) Huang Yaqiong					3	3
(China) Chen Qingchen				3		3
(China) Jia Yifan				3		3
(China) Huang Dongping					2	2
(China) Feng Yanzhe					2	2
(South Korea) Park Joo-bong					2	2
(China) Zhao Jianhua	2					2
(China) Li Lingwei		2				2
(South Korea) Hwang Hye-young				1	1	2
(Indonesia) Alan Budikusuma	2					2
(China) Huang Zhanzhong			2			2
(China) Jiang Xin			2			2
(China) Peng Xinyong					2	2
(South Korea) Kim Dong-moon			1		1	2
(China) Liu Yong					2	2
(China) Huang Sui				2		2
(China) Chen Hong	2					2
(Indonesia) Markis Kido			2			2
(Indonesia) Hendra Setiawan			2			2
(China) Zhao Tingting				2		2
(South Korea) Lee Hyo-jung					2	2
(China) Tian Qing				1	1	2
(Denmark) Mathias Boe			2			2
(Denmark) Carsten Mogensen			2			2
(South Korea) Yoo Yeon-seong			2			2
(Indonesia) Tontowi Ahmad					2	2
(Spain) Carolina Marín		2				2
(China) Wang Zhiyi		2				2
(China) Liu Shengshu				2		2
(China) Tan Ning				2		2
(Japan) Akane Yamaguchi		2				2
(Indonesia) Fajar Alfian			2			2
(Indonesia) Muhammad Shohibul Fikri			2			2

=== Men's Singles ===
Wins	Winner(s)
5	Lin Dan (China)
4	Chen Long (China)
3	Dong Jiong (China)
2	Zhao Jianhua (China)
2	Alan Budikusuma (Indonesia)
2	Chen Hong (China)

=== Women's Singles ===
Wins	Winner(s)
3	Zhang Ning (China)
3	Zhou Mi (China)
3	Jiang Yanjiao (China)
3	Li Xuerui (China)
2	Li Lingwei (China)
2	Carolina Marín (Spain)
2	Wang Zhiyi (China)
2	Akane Yamaguchi (Japan)

== Performances by nation ==
As of 2026 edition

	Nation	MS	WS	MD	WD	XD	Total
1	China	20	26	9	31	21	107
2	Indonesia	7		12	1	4	24
3	South Korea		2	7	2	7	18
4	Denmark	2		4		2	8
5	Malaysia	2	1	2			5
6	Japan	1	2		1		4
7	India	1	2				3
8	Chinese Taipei	2					2
8	Spain		2				2
10	England					1	1
10	Thailand			1			1
	Total	35	35	35	35	35	175
