= Sun Man =

Chinese badminton player

Sun Man 孙曼
Personal information
- Born: 23 July 1968 (age 58) Jiangsu, China

Sport
- Country: China
- Sport: Badminton
- Event: Mixed doubles
Medal record
Women's badminton
Representing China
Olympic Games
Bronze medal – third place	1996 Atlanta	Mixed doubles
World Cup
Bronze medal – third place	1992 Guangzhou	Mixed doubles
Sudirman Cup
Bronze medal – third place	1993 Birmingham	Mixed team
Asian Championships
Gold medal – first place	1994 Shanghai	Mixed doubles
Asian Cup
Gold medal – first place	1995 Qingdao	Mixed doubles
East Asian Games
Gold medal – first place	1993 Shanghai	Mixed doubles
Gold medal – first place	1993 Shanghai	Women's team

Sun Man (Chinese: 孙曼; born July 23, 1968) is a Chinese female badminton player who competed internationally in the 1990s.

== Career ==
Specializing in mixed doubles at the world level, Sun won the China Open (1993) and Asian Championships (1994) with countryman Chen Xingdong. She earned a bronze medal at the 1996 Olympics in Atlanta with another Chinese player, Liu Jianjun.

== Achievements ==
=== Olympic Games ===
Mixed doubles
Year	Venue	Partner	Opponent	Score	Result
1996	GSU Sports Arena, Atlanta, United States	(China) Liu Jianjun	(China) Chen Xingdong (China) Peng Xingyong	7–15, 15–4, 15–8	Bronze

=== World Cup ===
Mixed doubles
Year	Venue	Partner	Opponent	Score	Result
1992	Guangdong Gymnasium; Guangzhou, China	(China) Chen Xingdong	(Indonesia) Rudy Gunawan (Indonesia) Rosiana Tendean	15–11, 15–18, 15–17	Bronze

=== Asian Championships ===
Mixed doubles
Year	Venue	Partner	Opponent	Score	Result
1994	Shanghai Gymnasium, Shanghai, China	(China) Chen Xingdong	(China) Liu Jianjun (China) Wang Xiaoyuan	15–1, 15–11	Gold

=== Asian Cup ===
Mixed Doubles
Year	Venue	Partner	Opponent	Score	Result
1995	Xinxing Gymnasium, Qingdao, China	(China) Liu Jianjun	(South Korea) Kim Dong-Moon (South Korea) Gil Young-Ah	15–11, 7–15, 15–10	Gold

=== East Asian Games ===
Mixed doubles
Year	Venue	Partner	Opponent	Score	Result
1993	Shanghai, China	(China) Chen Xingdong	(China) Liang Qing (China) Peng Yun	15–3, 15–13	Gold

=== IBF World Grand Prix ===
The World Badminton Grand Prix sanctioned by International Badminton Federation (IBF) from 1983 to 2006.

Mixed doubles
Year	Tournament	Partner	Opponent	Score	Result
1991	China Open	(China) Zheng Shoutai	(China) Liu Jianjun (China) Wang Xiaoyuan	15–9, 10–15, 13–15	(silver) Runner-up
1992	French Open	(China) Chen Xingdong	(China) Liu Jianjun (China) Wang Xiaoyuan	17–18, 15–12, 4–15	(silver) Runner-up
1992	China Open	(China) Chen Xingdong	(Indonesia) Aryono Miranat (Indonesia) Eliza Nathanael	8–15, 15–9, 16–17	(silver) Runner-up
1993	Thailand Open	(China) Chen Xingdong	(China) Liu Jianjun (China) Wang Xiaoyuan	5–15, 11–15	(silver) Runner-up
1993	China Open	(China) Chen Xingdong	(South Korea) Yoo Yong-sung (South Korea) Jang Hye-ock	12–15, 15–9, 15–8	(gold) Winner
1995	Hong Kong Open	(China) Liu Jianjun	(South Korea) Park Joo-Bong (South Korea) Shim Eun-Jung	8–15, 15–2, 14–17	(silver) Runner-up
1996	Chinese Taipei Open	(China) Liu Jianjun	(Denmark) Michael Sogaard (Denmark) Rikke Olsen	3–15, 15–7, 12–15	(silver) Runner-up
