= Jan-Eric Antonsson =

Swedish badminton player (born 1961)

Personal information
- Born: 9 September 1961 (age 65) Karlskrona, Sweden
- Height: 1.83 m (6 ft 0 in)

Sport
- Country: Sweden
- Sport: Badminton
- Handedness: Right
- Event: Doubles

Doubles
- BWF profile
Medal record
Men's badminton
Representing Sweden
World Championships
Bronze medal – third place	1995 Lausanne	Mixed doubles
World Cup
Bronze medal – third place	1988 Bangkok	Mixed doubles
Bronze medal – third place	1989 Guangzhou	Mixed doubles
Bronze medal – third place	1994 Ho Chi Minh	Mixed doubles
World Senior Championships
Gold medal – first place	2023 Jeonju	Men's singles 60+
Gold medal – first place	2023 Jeonju	Men's doubles 60+
Gold medal – first place	2023 Jeonju	Mixed doubles 55+
Gold medal – first place	2025 Pattaya	Mixed doubles 60+
Silver medal – second place	2025 Pattaya	Men's singles 60+
European Championships
Silver medal – second place	1990 Moscow	Mixed doubles
Bronze medal – third place	1986 Uppsala	Men's doubles
Bronze medal – third place	1988 Kristiansand	Mixed doubles
European Mixed Team Championships
Silver medal – second place	1988 Kristiansand	Mixed team
Silver medal – second place	1990 Moscow	Mixed team
Bronze medal – third place	1986 Uppsala	Mixed team
European Junior Championships
Gold medal – first place	1979 Mülheim an der Ruhr	Boys' doubles
Bronze medal – third place	1979 Mülheim an der Ruhr	Mixed doubles
Bronze medal – third place	1979 Mülheim an der Ruhr	Mixed team

Jan-Eric Antonsson (born 9 September 1961) is a retired male badminton player from Sweden.

== Career ==
He won the bronze medal at the 1995 IBF World Championships in mixed doubles with Astrid Crabo. They also competed in badminton at the 1996 Summer Olympics and lost in the round of 16 to Trikus Heryanto and Minarti Timur.

== Achievements ==
=== World Championships ===
Mixed doubles
Year	Venue	Partner	Opponent	Score	Result
1995	Malley Sports Centre; Lausanne, Switzerland	(Sweden) Astrid Crabo	(Denmark) Thomas Lund (Denmark) Marlene Thomsen	15–12, 14–17, 9–15	Bronze

=== World Cup ===
Mixed doubles
Year	Venue	Partner	Opponent	Score	Result
1988	National Stadium; Bangkok, Thailand	(Sweden) Maria Bengtsson	(South Korea) Park Joo-bong (South Korea) Chung Myung-hee	6–15, 12–15	Bronze
1989	Guangzhou Gymnasium; Guangzhou, China	(Sweden) Maria Bengtsson	(South Korea) Park Joo-bong (South Korea) Chung Myung-hee	2–15, 8–15	Bronze
1994	Phan Đình Phùng Indoor Stadium; Ho Chi Minh City, Vietnam	(Sweden) Astrid Crabo	(Denmark) Thomas Lund (Sweden) Catrine Bengtsson	16–18, 12–15	Bronze

=== World Senior Championships ===
Men's singles

Year	Age	Venue	Opponent	Score	Result	Ref
2023	60+	Hwasan Indoor Stadium, Jeonju, South Korea	(Chinese Taipei) Chang Wen-sung	21–16, 21–13	Gold	
2025	60+	Eastern National Sports Training Centre, Pattaya, Thailand	(Thailand) Narong Vanichitsarakul	12–21, 10–21	Silver	

Men's doubles

Year	Age	Venue	Partner	Opponent	Score	Result
2023	60+	Hwasan Indoor Stadium, Jeonju, South Korea	(Denmark) Jan Bertram Petersen	(Netherlands) Uun Santosa (Indonesia) Simbarsono Sutanto	21–12, 15–21, 21–9	Gold

Mixed doubles

Year	Age	Venue	Partner	Opponent	Score	Result	Ref
2023	55+	Hwasan Indoor Stadium, Jeonju, South Korea	(Denmark) Hanne Bertelsen	(Chinese Taipei) Chou Tsai-shen (Chinese Taipei) Wang Ching-hui	21–17, 23–21	Gold	
2025	60+	Eastern National Sports Training Centre, Pattaya, Thailand	(Denmark) Hanne Bertelsen	(Denmark) Jan Bertram Petersen (Netherlands) Jeannette van der Werff	21–14, 17–21, 21–15	Gold	

=== European Championships ===
Men's doubles
Year	Venue	Partner	Opponent	Score	Result
1986	Fyrishallen; Uppsala, Sweden	(Sweden) Pär-Gunnar Jönsson	(Denmark) Steen Fladberg (Denmark) Jesper Helledie	7–15, 5–15	Bronze

Mixed doubles
Year	Venue	Partner	Opponent	Score	Result
1988	Badmintonsenteret; Kristiansand, Norway	(Sweden) Maria Bengtsson	(Netherlands) Alex Meijer (Netherlands) Erica van Dijck	15–10, 11–15, 10–15	Bronze
1990	Luzhniki; Moscow, Soviet Union	(Sweden) Maria Bengtsson	(Denmark) Jon-Holst Christensen (Denmark) Grete Mogensen	7–15, 8–15	Silver

=== European Senior Championships ===
Men's singles
Year	Age	Venue	Opponent	Score	Result
2022	60+	Dvorana Centre Stožice, Ljubljana, Slovenia	(Germany) Karsten Großgebauer	21–16, 21–15	Gold

Men's doubles
Year	Age	Venue	Partner	Opponent	Score	Result
2022	35+	Dvorana Centre Stožice; Ljubljana, Slovenia	(Sweden) Dennis von Dahn	(Austria) René Nichterwitz (Germany) Sebastian Nieke	12–21, 16–21	Silver

Mixed doubles
Year	Age	Venue	Partner	Opponent	Score	Result
2022	60+	Dvorana Centre Stožice; Ljubljana, Slovenia	(Denmark) Hanne Bertelsen	(Denmark) Jan Bertram Petersen (Netherlands) Jeannette van der Werff	21–9, 16–21, 21–17	Gold

=== European Junior Championships ===
Boys' doubles
Year	Venue	Partner	Opponent	Score	Result
1979	Carl Diem Halle; Mülheim an der Ruhr, West Germany	(Sweden) Peter Isaksson	(West Germany) Harald Klauer (West Germany) Gerhard Treitinger	15–9, 16–17, 15–0	Gold

Mixed doubles
Year	Venue	Partner	Opponent	Score	Result
1979	Carl Diem Halle; Mülheim an der Ruhr, West Germany	(Sweden) Ann-Sofi Bergman	(Sweden) Peter Isaksson (Sweden) Lena Axelsson	10–15, 12–15	Bronze

=== IBF World Grand Prix ===
The World Badminton Grand Prix sanctioned by International Badminton Federation (IBF) from 1983 to 2006.

Men's doubles
Year	Tournament	Partner	Opponent	Score	Result	Ref.
1987	Denmark Open	(Sweden) Pär-Gunnar Jönsson	(Malaysia) Jalani Sidek (Malaysia) Razif Sidek	11–15, 7–15	(silver) Runner-up	
1988	Chinese Taipei Open	(Sweden) Pär-Gunnar Jönsson	(Thailand) Sawei Chanseorasmee (Thailand) Sakrapee Thongsari	15–11, 9–15, 11–15	(silver) Runner-up	
1989	Chinese Taipei Open	(Sweden) Pär-Gunnar Jönsson	(Malaysia) Jalani Sidek (Malaysia) Razif Sidek	3–15, 2–15	(silver) Runner-up	
1989	Japan Open	(Sweden) Pär-Gunnar Jönsson	(South Korea) Lee Sang-bok (South Korea) Park Joo-bong	6–15, 5–15	(silver) Runner-up	
1992	Swiss Open	(Sweden) Stellan Österberg	(Sweden) Patrik Andreasson (Sweden) Mikael Rosén	15–7, 15–7	(gold) Winner	
1993	Finnish Open	(Sweden) Mikael Rosén	(Denmark) Christian Jakobsen (Denmark) Henrik Svarrer	7–15, 15–17	(silver) Runner-up	

Mixed doubles
Year	Tournament	Partner	Opponent	Score	Result
1988	Chinese Taipei Open	(Sweden) Maria Bengtsson	(England) Andy Goode (England) Gillian Gowers	7–15, 13–15	(silver) Runner-up
1989	Poona Open	(Sweden) Maria Bengtsson	(Denmark) Jan Paulsen (England) Gillian Gowers	15–18, 12–15	(silver) Runner-up
1989	All England Open	(Sweden) Maria Bengtsson	(South Korea) Park Joo-bong (South Korea) Chung Myung-hee	1–15, 9–15	(silver) Runner-up
1990	Chinese Taipei Open	(Sweden) Maria Bengtsson	(Denmark) Thomas Lund (Denmark) Pernille Dupont	4–15, 15–4, 10–15	(silver) Runner-up
1990	Swedish Open	(Sweden) Maria Bengtsson	(Denmark) Jon Holst-Christensen (Denmark) Grete Mogensen	15–12, 8–15, 15–9	(gold) Winner
1990	Singapore Open	(Sweden) Maria Bengtsson	(Denmark) Jan Paulsen (England) Gillian Gowers	9–15, 15–10, 15–7	(gold) Winner
1992	Swiss Open	(Sweden) Astrid Crabo	(Sweden) Mikael Rosén (Sweden) Maria Bengtsson	18–15, 12–15, 5–15	(silver) Runner-up
1992	U. S. Open	(Denmark) Lotte Olsen	(Denmark) Thomas Lund (Denmark) Pernille Dupont	5–15, 10–15	(silver) Runner-up
1992	Scottish Open	(Sweden) Astrid Crabo	(Denmark) Jon Holst-Christensen (Denmark) Anne Mette Bille	15–11, 11–15, 15–10	(gold) Winner
1993	Swiss Open	(Sweden) Astrid Crabo	(Sweden) Pär-Gunnar Jönsson (Sweden) Maria Bengtsson	15–11, 14–17, 7–15	(silver) Runner-up
1993	Dutch Open	(Sweden) Astrid Crabo	(Sweden) Pär-Gunnar Jönsson (Sweden) Maria Bengtsson	18–13, 9–15, 15–9	(gold) Winner
1993	Denmark Open	(Sweden) Astrid Crabo	(Denmark) Thomas Lund (Sweden) Catrine Bengtsson	4–15, 4–15	(silver) Runner-up
1993	Finnish Open	(Sweden) Astrid Crabo	(Denmark) Christian Jakobsen (Denmark) Marlene Thomsen	15–10, 15–11	(gold) Winner
1994	Malaysia Open	(Sweden) Astrid Crabo	(China) Liu Jianjun (China) Ge Fei	15–9, 15–11	(gold) Winner
1994	German Open	(Sweden) Astrid Crabo	(Denmark) Thomas Lund (Denmark) Marlene Thomsen	18–14, 7–15, 8–15	(silver) Runner-up
1994	Scottish Open	(Sweden) Astrid Crabo	(Germany) Michael Keck (Germany) Karen Stechmann	15–12, 15–12	(gold) Winner
1994	World Grand Prix Finals	(Sweden) Astrid Crabo	(Denmark) Thomas Lund (Denmark) Marlene Thomsen	4–15, 9–15	(silver) Runner-up
1996	Swiss Open	(Sweden) Astrid Crabo	(England) Simon Archer (England) Julie Bradbury	15–7, 12–15, 15–11	(gold) Winner
1996	Dutch Open	(Sweden) Astrid Crabo	(Sweden) Peter Axelsson (Sweden) Catrine Bengtsson	9–0, 9–7, 9–6	(gold) Winner

=== IBF International ===
Men's doubles
Year	Tournament	Partner	Opponent	Score	Result
1984	USSR International	(Sweden) Pär-Gunnar Jönsson	(Sweden) Ulf Persson (Sweden) Stellan Österberg	15–6, 15–8	(gold) Winner
1986	Nordic Championships	(Sweden) Pär-Gunnar Jönsson	(Denmark) Steen Fladberg (Denmark) Morten Frost	10–15, 12–15	(silver) Runner-up
1988	Nordic Championships	(Sweden) Stellan Österberg	(Denmark) Michael Kjeldsen (Denmark) Jens Peter Nierhoff	0–15, 10–15	(silver) Runner-up
1991	Norwegian International	(Sweden) Stellan Österberg	(Denmark) Christian Jakobsen (Denmark) Martin Lundgaard Hansen	15–6, 15–5	(gold) Winner
1993	Uppsala International	(Sweden) Mikael Rosén	(Denmark) Max Gandrup (Sweden) Stellan Österberg	15–9, 15–9	(gold) Winner

Mixed doubles
Year	Tournament	Partner	Opponent	Score	Result
1984	USSR International	(Sweden) Lilian Johansson	(Sweden) Ulf Persson (Sweden) Charlotta Wihlborg	10–15, 17–15, 12–15	(silver) Runner-up
1986	Nordic Championships	(Sweden) Maria Bengtsson	(Denmark) Steen Fladberg (Denmark) Gitte Paulsen	17–16, 15–3	(gold) Winner
1988	Nordic Championships	(Sweden) Maria Bengtsson	(Denmark) Jesper Knudsen (Denmark) Nettie Nielsen	11–15, 17–16, 10–15	(silver) Runner-up
1990	Stockholm International	(Sweden) Charlotta Wihlborg	(Denmark) Michael Søgaard (Denmark) Charlotte Madsen	12–15, 15–10, 15–8	(gold) Winner
1991	Norwegian International	(Sweden) Astrid Crabo	(Denmark) Christian Jakobsen (Denmark) Marianne Rasmussen	18–15, 15–7	(gold) Winner
1992	Nordic Championships	(Sweden) Astrid Crabo	(Sweden) Pär-Gunnar Jönsson (Sweden) Maria Bengtsson	6–15, 15–12, 10–15	(silver) Runner-up
1993	Uppsala International	(Sweden) Astrid Crabo	(Sweden) Mikael Rosén (Sweden) Maria Bengtsson	15–6, 15–7	(gold) Winner
