= Astrid Crabo =

Swedish badminton player

Personal information
- Born: 10 July 1971 (age 55) Täby, Sweden
- Height: 1.68 m (5 ft 6 in)

Sport
- Country: Sweden
- Sport: Badminton
- Handedness: Right
- Event: Mixed doubles

Mixed doubles
- BWF profile
Medal record
Women's badminton
Representing Sweden
World Championships
Bronze medal – third place	1995 Lausanne	Mixed doubles
World Cup
Bronze medal – third place	1994 Ho Chi Minh	Mixed doubles
Uber Cup
Bronze medal – third place	1992 Kuala Lumpur	Women's team
European Junior Championships
Bronze medal – third place	1989 Manchester	Girls' doubles
Bronze medal – third place	1989 Manchester	Mixed team

Astrid Crabo (born 10 July 1971) is a Swedish retired badminton player affiliated with Täby BMF. She won a bronze medal at the 1995 IBF World Championships in the mixed doubles with Jan-Eric Antonsson, with whom she won the 1993 and 1996 Dutch Open tournaments. They competed in badminton at the 1996 Summer Olympics, but lost in round 16 to Tri Kusharjanto and Minarti Timur from Indonesia. Crabo was named 1989 Swedish Junior player of the year.

== Achievements ==
=== World Championships ===
Mixed doubles
Year	Venue	Partner	Opponent	Score	Result
1995	Malley Sports Centre; Lausanne, Switzerland	(Sweden) Jan-Eric Antonsson	(Denmark) Thomas Lund (Denmark) Marlene Thomsen	15–12, 14–17, 9–15	Bronze

=== World Cup ===
Mixed doubles
Year	Venue	Partner	Opponent	Score	Result
1994	Phan Đình Phùng Indoor Stadium; Ho Chi Minh City, Vietnam	(Sweden) Jan-Eric Antonsson	(Denmark) Thomas Lund (Sweden) Catrine Bengtsson	16–18, 12–15	Bronze

=== European Junior Championships ===
Girls' doubles
Year	Venue	Partner	Opponent	Score	Result
1989	Armitage Centre; Manchester, England	(Sweden) Veronica Sandberg	(Denmark) Trine Johansson (Denmark) Marlene Thomsen	6–15, 9–15	Bronze

=== IBF World Grand Prix ===
The World Badminton Grand Prix was sanctioned by the International Badminton Federation from 1983 to 2006.

Mixed doubles
Year	Tournament	Partner	Opponent	Score	Result
1992	Swiss Open	(Sweden) Jan-Eric Antonsson	(Sweden) Mikael Rosén (Sweden) Maria Bengtsson	18–15, 12–15, 5–15	(silver) Runner-up
1992	Scottish Open	(Sweden) Jan-Eric Antonsson	(Denmark) Jon Holst-Christensen (Denmark) Anne Mette Bille	15–11, 11–15, 15–10	(gold) Winner
1993	Swiss Open	(Sweden) Jan-Eric Antonsson	(Sweden) Pär-Gunnar Jönsson (Sweden) Maria Bengtsson	15–11, 14–17, 7–15	(silver) Runner-up
1993	Dutch Open	(Sweden) Jan-Eric Antonsson	(Sweden) Pär-Gunnar Jönsson (Sweden) Maria Bengtsson	18–13, 9–15, 15–9	(gold) Winner
1993	Denmark Open	(Sweden) Jan-Eric Antonsson	(Denmark) Thomas Lund (Sweden) Catrine Bengtsson	4–15, 4–15	(silver) Runner-up
1993	Finnish Open	(Sweden) Jan-Eric Antonsson	(Denmark) Christian Jakobsen (Denmark) Marlene Thomsen	15–10, 15–11	(gold) Winner
1994	Malaysia Open	(Sweden) Jan-Eric Antonsson	(China) Liu Jianjun (China) Ge Fei	15–9, 15–11	(gold) Winner
1994	German Open	(Sweden) Jan-Eric Antonsson	(Denmark) Thomas Lund (Denmark) Marlene Thomsen	18–14, 7–15, 8–15	(silver) Runner-up
1994	Scottish Open	(Sweden) Jan-Eric Antonsson	(Germany) Michael Keck (Germany) Karen Stechmann	15–12, 15–12	(gold) Winner
1994	World Grand Prix Finals	(Sweden) Jan-Eric Antonsson	(Denmark) Thomas Lund (Denmark) Marlene Thomsen	4–15, 9–15	(silver) Runner-up
1996	Swiss Open	(Sweden) Jan-Eric Antonsson	(England) Simon Archer (England) Julie Bradbury	15–7, 12–15, 15–11	(gold) Winner
1996	Dutch Open	(Sweden) Jan-Eric Antonsson	(Sweden) Peter Axelsson (Sweden) Catrine Bengtsson	9–0, 9–7, 9–6	(gold) Winner

=== IBF International ===
Women's singles
Year	Tournament	Opponent	Score	Result
1994	Norwegian International	(Sweden) Margit Borg	11–3, 5–11, 7–11	(silver) Runner-up

Women's doubles
Year	Tournament	Partner	Opponent	Score	Result
1989	USSR International	(Sweden) Margit Borg	(Soviet Union) Svetlana Belyasova (Soviet Union) Irina Serova	14–17, 5–15	(silver) Runner-up
1996	Hungarian International	(Sweden) Johanna Holgersson	(Netherlands) Anthoinette Achterberg (Netherlands) Lotte Jonathans	15–10, 15–3	(gold) Winner

Mixed doubles
Year	Tournament	Partner	Opponent	Score	Result
1991	Norwegian International	(Sweden) Jan-Eric Antonsson	(Denmark) Christian Jakobsen (Denmark) Marianne Rasmussen	18–15, 15–7	(gold) Winner
1992	Uppsala International	(Denmark) Max Gandrup	(Denmark) Christian Jakobsen (Denmark) Marianne Rasmussen	6–15, 9–15	(silver) Runner-up
1992	Nordic Championships	(Sweden) Jan-Eric Antonsson	(Sweden) Pär-Gunnar Jönsson (Sweden) Maria Bengtsson	6–15, 15–12, 10–15	(silver) Runner-up
1993	Uppsala International	(Sweden) Jan-Eric Antonsson	(Sweden) Mikael Rosén (Sweden) Maria Bengtsson	15–6, 15–7	(gold) Winner
1996	Scottish Open	(Sweden) Jens Olsson	(England) Nick Ponting (England) Joanne Goode	15–12, 11–15, 15–8	(gold) Winner
