= Liu Jianjun =

Chinese badminton player

Liu Jianjun 刘坚军
Personal information
- Born: 5 January 1969 (age 57) Ningbo, Zhejiang, China
- Height: 1.8 m (5 ft 11 in)

Sport
- Country: China
- Sport: Badminton
- Handedness: Right
- Event: Doubles

Doubles
- BWF profile
Medal record
Men's badminton
Representing China
Olympic Games
Bronze medal – third place	1996 Atlanta	Mixed doubles
World Championships
Bronze medal – third place	1995 Lausanne	Mixed doubles
Sudirman Cup
Gold medal – first place	1995 Lausanne	Mixed team
Thomas Cup
Bronze medal – third place	1996 Hong Kong	Mixed team
Asian Games
Bronze medal – third place	1994 Hiroshima	Men's team
Asian Championships
Gold medal – first place	1995 Beijing	Mixed doubles
Silver medal – second place	1994 Shanghai	Mixed doubles
Asian Cup
Gold medal – first place	1994 Beijing	Mixed doubles
Gold medal – first place	1995 Qingdao	Mixed doubles

Liu Jianjun (Chinese: 刘坚军; born January 5, 1969 Ningbo) is a male Chinese badminton player who played internationally in the 1990s.

== Career ==
Liu shared a number of mixed doubles titles on the world circuit. He won the China (1991), French (1992), and Thailand (1993) Opens with Wang Xiaoyuan, and the Asian Championships (1995) with Ge Fei. Liu was a bronze medalist at the 1996 Atlanta Olympics with yet another partner, Sun Man.

== Achievements ==
=== Olympic Games ===
Mixed doubles
Year	Venue	Partner	Opponent	Score	Result
1996	GSU Sports Arena, Atlanta, United States	(China) Sun Man	(China) Chen Xingdong (China) Peng Xingyong	7–15, 15–4, 15–8	Bronze

=== World Championships ===
Mixed doubles
Year	Venue	Partner	Opponent	Score	Result
1995	Malley Sports Centre, Lausanne, Switzerland	(China) Ge Fei	(Denmark) Jens Eriksen (Denmark) Helene Kirkegaard	5–15, 3–15	Bronze

=== Asian Championships ===
Mixed Doubles
Year	Venue	Partner	Opponent	Score	Result
1994	Shanghai Gymnasium, Shanghai, China	(China) Wang Xiaoyuan	(China) Chen Xingdong (China) Sun Man	1–15, 11–15	Silver
1995	Olympic Sports Centre Gymnasium, Beijing, China	(China) Ge Fei	(China) Jiang Xin (China) Zhang Jin	15–4, 12–15, 15–5	Gold

=== Asian Cup ===
Mixed Doubles
Year	Venue	Partner	Opponent	Score	Result
1994	Beijing Gymnasium, Beijing, China	(China) Ge Fei	(Indonesia) Aryono Miranat (Indonesia) Eliza Nathanael	15–4, 13–15, 15–10	Gold
1995	Xinxing Gymnasium, Qingdao, China	(China) Sun Man	(South Korea) Kim Dong-Moon (South Korea) Gil Young-Ah	15–11, 7–15, 15–10	Gold

=== IBF World Grand Prix ===
The World Badminton Grand Prix sanctioned by International Badminton Federation (IBF) from 1983 to 2006.

Mixed Doubles
Year	Tournament	Partner	Opponent	Score	Result
1991	China Open	(China) Wang Xiaoyuan	(China) Zheng Shoutai (China) Sun Man	9–15, 15–10, 15–13	(gold) Winner
1992	French Open	(China) Wang Xiaoyuan	(China) Chen Xingdong (China) Sun Man	18–17, 12–15, 15–4	(gold) Winner
1993	Thailand Open	(China) Wang Xiaoyuan	(China) Chen Xingdong (China) Sun Man	15–5, 15–11	(gold) Winner
1994	Malaysia Open	(China) Ge Fei	(Sweden) Jan-Eric Antonsson (Sweden) Astrid Crabo	9–15, 11–15	(silver) Runner-up
1995	Korea Open	(China) Ge Fei	(Denmark) Thomas Lund (Denmark) Marlene Thomsen	4–15, 15–18	(silver) Runner-up
1995	Hong Kong Open	(China) Sun Man	(South Korea) Park Joo-Bong (South Korea) Shim Eun-Jung	8–15, 15–2, 14–17	(silver) Runner-up
1996	Chinese Taipei Open	(China) Sun Man	(Denmark) Michael Sogaard (Denmark) Rikke Olsen	3–15, 15–7, 12–15	(silver) Runner-up
