= 1993 Hong Kong Open =

Badminton championships

The 1993 Hong Kong Open in badminton was held in the Queen Elizabeth Stadium, Wanchai, Hong Kong, from November 15 to November 21, with a prize of USD 60,000.

== Results ==
=== Men's singles ===
Quarterfinals
(Indonesia) Hermawan Susanto	15	9	18
(Denmark) Høyer Larsen	5	15	15
(Indonesia) Ardy Wiranata	15	15
(China) Liu Jun	11	6
(Denmark) Stuer-Lauridsen	15	15	15
(China) Ge Cheng	18	10	2
(South Korea) Kim Hak-kyun	2	18	15
(Indonesia) Hariyanto Arbi	15	17	12

Semifinals
(Indonesia) Hermawan Susanto	15	6	15
(Indonesia) Ardy Wiranata	6	15	10
(Denmark) Stuer-Lauridsen	15	15
(South Korea) Kim Hak-kyun	10	6

Finals
(Indonesia) Hermawan Susanto	15	15
(Denmark) Stuer-Lauridsen	7	4

=== Women's singles ===
Quarterfinals
(China) Ye Zhaoying	5	11	11
(Japan) Hisako Mizui	11	2	5
(South Korea) Ra Kyung-min	11	11
(Indonesia) Meiluawati	1	7
(China) Han Jingna	11	11
(China) Liu Yuhong	5	5
(China) Zhang Ning	11	7	12
(China) Tang Yongsu	7	11	11

Semifinals
(China) Ye Zhaoying	11	11
(South Korea) Ra Kyung-min	4	8
(China) Han Jingna	11	11
(China) Zhang Ning	8	8

Finals
(China) Ye Zhaoying	10	11	11
(China) Han Jingna	12	7	6

=== Men's doubles ===
Quarterfinals
(Indonesia) Denny Kantono (Indonesia) Antonius	17	15
(South Korea) Lee Kwang-Jin (South Korea) Kang Kyung-Jin	15	3
(Indonesia) Gunawan (Indonesia) Bambang Suprianto	15	15
(Chinese Taipei) Ger Shin Min (Chinese Taipei) Young Shih Jen	8	7
(Thailand) Sakrapee Thongsari (Thailand) P. Taerawiwatana	18	15
(Hong Kong) Chan Siu Kong (Hong Kong) Ng Pak Kum	13	5
(Indonesia) Imay Hendra (Indonesia) Dicky Purwosugiono	15	18
(China) Chen Kang (China) Chen Hongyong

Semifinals
(Indonesia) Denny Kantono (Indonesia) Antonius	15	12	15
(Indonesia) Gunawan (Indonesia) Bambang Suprianto	6	15	2
(Thailand) Sakrapee Thongsari (Thailand) P. Taerawiwatana	11	15	15
(Indonesia) Imay Hendra (Indonesia) Dicky Purwosugiono	15	9	11

Finals
(Indonesia) Denny Kantono (Indonesia) Antonius	10	15	17
(Thailand) Sakrapee Thongsari (Thailand) P. Taerawiwatana	15	3	14

=== Women's doubles ===
Quarterfinals
(China) Wu Yuhong (China) Chen Ying	15	15
(Chinese Taipei) Tsai Huei Ming (Chinese Taipei) Chen Lih Jin	9	5
(China) Tang Yongsu (China) Zhang Jin	WO	WO
(Hong Kong) Chen Yin Sat (Hong Kong) Chung Hoi Yuk
(Indonesia) Eliza Nathanael (Indonesia) Zelin Resiana	15	15
(Hong Kong) Tung Chau Man (Hong Kong) Ngan Fai	10	9
(South Korea) Kim Shin-Young (South Korea) Jang Hye-Ock	15	15
(China) Ye Sichun (China) Fan Linhua	8	11

Semifinals
(China) Wu Yuhong (China) Chen Ying	15	5	15
(China) Tang Yongsu (China) Zhang Jin	13	15	9
(Indonesia) Eliza Nathanael (Indonesia) Zelin Resiana	18	15
(South Korea) Kim Shin-Young (South Korea) Jang Hye-Ock	13	11

Finals
(China) Wu Yuhong (China) Chen Ying	15	15
(Indonesia) Eliza Nathanael (Indonesia) Zelin Resiana	7	8

=== Mixed doubles ===
Quarterfinals
(Indonesia) Rudy Gunawan (Indonesia) Rosiana Tendean	15	17
(South Korea) Ha Tae-kwon (South Korea) Kim Shin-Young	11	15
(Malaysia) Yap Kim Hock (Malaysia) Lee Wai Leng	17	17
(Hong Kong) Chan Siu Kwong (Hong Kong) Chung Hoi Yuk	16	14
(Indonesia) Aryono (Indonesia) Risyeu Rosalina	15	15
(Chinese Taipei) Liu En Hong (Chinese Taipei) Feng Mei Ying	10	11
(Indonesia) Joko Mardianto (Indonesia) Sri Untari	7	15	15
(South Korea) Yoo Young-Sung (South Korea) Jang Hye-Ock	15	10	10

Semifinals
(Indonesia) Rudy Gunawan (Indonesia) Rosiana Tendean	15	17
(Malaysia) Yap Kim Hock (Malaysia) Lee Wai Leng	15	5
(Indonesia) Aryono (Indonesia) Riseu Rosalina	15	15
(Indonesia) Joko Mardianto (Indonesia) Sri Untari	7	4

Finals
(Indonesia) Rudy Gunawan (Indonesia) Rosiana Tendean	15	15
(Indonesia) Aryono (Indonesia) Risyeu Rosalina	12	6
