= Wang Xiaoyuan =

Chinese badminton player

Wang Xiaoyuan 王晓圆
Personal information
- Born: 12 May 1968 (age 58)
- Height: 1.68 m (5 ft 6 in)
- Weight: 60 kg (132 lb)

Sport
- Country: China
- Sport: Badminton
Medal record
Women's badminton
Representing China
Sudirman Cup
Gold medal – first place	1995 Lausanne	Mixed Team
Asian Championships
Silver medal – second place	1994 Shanghai	Mixed Doubles

Wang Xiaoyuan (born 12 May 1968) is a Chinese badminton player. She won the China (1991), French (1992), and Thailand (1993) Opens with Liu Jianjun. She competed in mixed doubles at the 1996 Summer Olympics in Atlanta.

== Achievements ==
=== Asian Championships ===
Mixed Doubles
Year	Venue	Partner	Opponent	Score	Result
1994	Shanghai Gymnasium, Shanghai, China	(China) Liu Jianjun	(China) Chen Xingdong (China) Sun Man	1–15, 11–15	Silver

=== IBF World Grand Prix ===
The World Badminton Grand Prix sanctioned by International Badminton Federation (IBF) from 1983 to 2006.

Mixed Doubles
Year	Tournament	Partner	Opponent	Score	Result
1991	China Open	(China) Liu Jianjun	(China) Zheng Shoutai (China) Sun Man	9–15, 15–10, 15–13	(gold) Winner
1992	French Open	(China) Liu Jianjun	(China) Chen Xingdong (China) Sun Man	18–17, 12–15, 15–4	(gold) Winner
1993	Thailand Open	(China) Liu Jianjun	(China) Chen Xingdong (China) Sun Man	15–5, 15–11	(gold) Winner
1995	Swedish Open	(China) Chen Xingdong	(South Korea) Kim Dong-Moon (South Korea) Gil Young-Ah	18–13, 5–15, 15–9	(gold) Winner
1996	Malaysia Open	(China) Tao Xiaoqiang	(South Korea) Kim Dong-Moon (South Korea) Gil Young-Ah	7–15, 9–15	(silver) Runner-Up

=== IBF International ===
Mixed Doubles
Year	Tournament	Partner	Opponent	Score	Result
1991	Polish Open	(China) Li Jian	(Belarus) Vitali Shmakov (Belarus) Vlada Tcherniavskaia	8–15, 15–9, 15–10	(gold) Winner
