= Chen Xingdong =

Chinese badminton player

Chen Xingdong 陈兴东
Personal information
- Born: 2 April 1970 (age 56) Sichuan, China
- Height: 1.83 m (6 ft 0 in)
- Weight: 75 kg (165 lb)

Sport
- Country: China
- Sport: Badminton
- Handedness: Right

Mixed doubles
- Highest ranking: 3 (June 1996)
- BWF profile
Medal record
Men's badminton
Representing China
World Cup
Silver medal – second place	1994 Ho Chi Minh	Mixed doubles
Bronze medal – third place	1996 Jakarta	Mixed doubles
Bronze medal – third place	1992 Guangzhou	Mixed doubles
Sudirman Cup
Gold medal – first place	1997 Glasgow	Mixed team
Gold medal – first place	1995 Lausanne	Mixed team
Asian Games
Bronze medal – third place	1994 Hiroshima	Men's team
Asian Championships
Gold medal – first place	1994 Shanghai	Mixed doubles
East Asian Games
Gold medal – first place	1993 Shanghai	Mixed doubles
Gold medal – first place	1993 Shanghai	Men's team

Chen Xingdong (Chinese: 陈兴东; pinyin: Chén Xīngdōng; born 2 April 1970) is a Chinese former badminton player. He competed at the 1996 Summer Olympics in the mixed doubles event together with his partner Peng Xinyong. Chen was part of the Sichuan Sports Technology College team since 1984 and retired from the international tournament in 1997. In 1998, he was selected as a coach in Sichuan Province team and at the same year he join national team as a men's team coach. In early 2000, he focused as a mixed doubles coach.

His career in badminton started to appear in 1993 when he and his mixed doubles partner Sun Man won the gold medal at the 1993 East Asian Games, 1993 China Open, and 1994 Asian Championships. Chen qualified to compete at the 1994 World Cup with Gu Jun and finished as a runner-up. In 1995, he cooperated with Wang Xiaoyuan, won the mixed doubles title at the Swedish Open, and third place at the China Open.

In the middle of 1995, he teamed-up with Peng Xinyong. The duo became the champion at the 1995 Denmark and China Open, 1996 Polish Open, and qualified to compete at the 1996 Summer Olympics finished in the fourth place after lose a bronze medal match to Liu Jianjun and Sun Man in straight games 15–7, 4–15, 8–15. Chen two times helps the national mixed team clinched the Sudirman Cup in 1995 and 1997. He reached a career high as world No. 3 in June 1996 together with Peng.

== Achievements ==
=== World Cup ===
Mixed doubles
Year	Venue	Partner	Opponent	Score	Result
1996	Istora Senayan; Jakarta, Indonesia	(China) Peng Xinyong	(Indonesia) Flandy Limpele (Indonesia) Rosalina Riseu	9–15, 13–15	Bronze
1994	Phan Đình Phùng Indoor Stadium; Ho Chi Minh City, Vietnam	(China) Gu Jun	(Denmark) Thomas Lund (Sweden) Catrine Bengtsson	15–10, 10–15, 2–15	Silver
1992	Guangdong Gymnasium; Guangzhou, China	(China) Sun Man	(Indonesia) Rudy Gunawan (Indonesia) Rosiana Tendean	15–11, 15–18, 15–17	Bronze

=== Asian Championships ===
Mixed doubles
Year	Venue	Partner	Opponent	Score	Result
1994	Shanghai Gymnasium, Shanghai, China	(China) Sun Man	(China) Liu Jianjun (China) Wang Xiaoyuan	15–1, 15–11	Gold

=== East Asian Games ===
Mixed doubles
Year	Venue	Partner	Opponent	Score	Result
1993	Shanghai, China	(China) Sun Man	(China) Liang Qing (China) Peng Yun	15–3, 15–13	Gold

=== IBF World Grand Prix ===
The World Badminton Grand Prix sanctioned by International Badminton Federation (IBF) since 1983.

Mixed doubles
Year	Tournament	Partner	Opponent	Score	Result
1996	China Open	(China) Peng Xinyong	(Denmark) Michael Søgaard (Denmark) Rikke Olsen	15–10, 15–4	(gold) Winner
1996	Russian Open	(China) Peng Xinyong	(Denmark) Michael Søgaard (Denmark) Rikke Olsen	11–15, 15–12, 15–8	(gold) Winner
1996	Polish Open	(China) Peng Xinyong	(England) Nick Ponting (England) Joanne Goode	10–15, 15–12, 15–8	(gold) Winner
1996	Swedish Open	(China) Peng Xinyong	(South Korea) Park Joo-bong (South Korea) Ra Kyung-min	4–15, 6–15	(silver) Runner-up
1995	China Open	(China) Peng Xinyong	(South Korea) Park Joo-bong (South Korea) Shim Eun-jung	15–11, 4–15, 15–10	(gold) Winner
1995	Denmark Open	(China) Peng Xinyong	(Indonesia) Flandy Limpele (Indonesia) Rosalina Riseu	3–15, 15–10, 15–12	(gold) Winner
1995	Swedish Open	(China) Wang Xiaoyuan	(South Korea) Kim Dong-moon (South Korea) Gil Young-ah	18–13, 5–15, 15–9	(gold) Winner
1993	China Open	(China) Sun Man	(South Korea) Yoo Yong-sung (South Korea) Jang Hye-ock	12–15, 15–9, 15–8	(gold) Winner
1993	Thailand Open	(China) Sun Man	(China) Liu Jianjun (China) Wang Xiaoyuan	5–15, 11–15	(silver) Runner-up
1992	China Open	(China) Sun Man	(Indonesia) Aryono Miranat (Indonesia) Eliza Nathanael	8–15, 15–9, 16–17	(silver) Runner-up
1992	French Open	(China) Sun Man	(China) Liu Jianjun (China) Wang Xiaoyuan	17–18, 15–12, 4–15	(silver) Runner-up
