= Peng Xinyong =

Chinese badminton player

Peng Xinyong 彭新勇
Personal information
- Born: 20 January 1973 (age 53) Shandong, China
- Height: 1.62 m (5 ft 4 in)
- Weight: 51 kg (112 lb)

Sport
- Country: China
- Sport: Badminton
- Handedness: Right

Women's & mixed doubles
- Highest ranking: 3 (June 1996)
- BWF profile
Medal record
Women's badminton
Representing China
World Cup
Bronze medal – third place	1996 Jakarta	Mixed doubles
Uber Cup
Silver medal – second place	1996 Hong Kong	Women's team
Asian Championships
Bronze medal – third place	1995 Beijing	Women's doubles
Bronze medal – third place	1994 Shanghai	Women's doubles
East Asian Games
Gold medal – first place	1997 Busan	Women's doubles
Gold medal – first place	1997 Busan	Women's team
Bronze medal – third place	1997 Busan	Mixed doubles

Peng Xinyong (Chinese: 彭新勇; born 20 January 1973) is a Chinese former badminton player. She competed at the 1996 Summer Olympics in the women's and mixed doubles teamed-up with Chen Ying and Chen Xingdong respectively. Together with Chen Xingdong, she reached a career high as World No. 3 in the mixed doubles event. Peng won a gold medal at the 1997 East Asian Games in the women's doubles event with Zhang Jin. She also part of the national team that won the 1995 Sudirman Cup and runner-up at the 1996 Uber Cup.

== Achievements ==
=== World Cup ===
Mixed doubles
Year	Venue	Partner	Opponent	Score	Result
1996	Istora Senayan, Jakarta, Indonesia	(China) Chen Xingdong	(Indonesia) Flandy Limpele (Indonesia) Rosalina Riseu	9–15, 13–15	Bronze

=== Asian Championships ===
Women's doubles
Year	Venue	Partner	Opponent	Score	Result
1994	Shanghai Gymnasium, Shanghai, China	(China) Zhang Jin	(China) Chen Ying (China) Wu Yuhong	3–15, 9–15	Bronze
1995	Olympic Sports Center Gymnasium, Beijing, China	(China) Zhang Jin	(China) Qin Yiyuan (China) Tang Yongshu	3–15, 8–15	Bronze

=== East Asian Games ===
Women's doubles
Year	Venue	Partner	Opponent	Score	Result
1997	Pukyong National University Gymnasium, Busan, South Korea	(China) Zhang Jin	(China) Liu Lufang (China) Wang Li	15–8, 15–6	Gold

Mixed doubles
Year	Venue	Partner	Opponent	Score	Result
1997	Pukyong National University Gymnasium, Busan, South Korea	(China) Hu Zhilang		–, –	Bronze

=== IBF World Grand Prix ===
The World Badminton Grand Prix sanctioned by International Badminton Federation (IBF) since 1983.

Women's doubles
Year	Tournament	Partner	Opponent	Score	Result
1994	Brunei Open	(China) Zhang Jin	(England) Karen Chapman (England) Joanne Muggeridge	15–11, 12–16, 15–5	(gold) Winner
1994	Dutch Open	(China) Zhang Jin	(China) Qin Yiyuan (China) Tang Yongshu	15–4, 15–7	(gold) Winner
1994	German Open	(China) Zhang Jin	(Denmark) Marlene Thomsen (Denmark) Anne Mette Bille	15–11, 15–5	(gold) Winner
1995	Russian Open	(China) Chen Ying	(Russia) Elena Rybkhina (Russia) Marina Yakusheva	15–4, 15–12	(gold) Winner
1995	Sydney Open	(China) Zhang Jin	(Indonesia) Carmelita (Indonesia) Etty Tantri	15–9, 12–15, 15–4	(gold) Winner
1995	German Open	(China) Chen Ying	(Indonesia) Eliza Nathanael (Indonesia) Zelin Resiana	Walkover	(silver) Runner-up
1996	Vietnam Open	(China) Zhang Jin	(China) Sun Jian (China) Zeng Yaqiong	15–9, 12–15, 15–8	(gold) Winner

Mixed doubles
Year	Tournament	Partner	Opponent	Score	Result
1995	Denmark Open	(China) Chen Xingdong	(Indonesia) Flandy Limpele (Indonesia) Rosalina Riseu	3–15, 15–10, 15–12	(gold) Winner
1995	China Open	(China) Chen Xingdong	(South Korea) Park Joo-bong (South Korea) Shim Eun-jung	15–11, 4–15, 15–10	(gold) Winner
1996	Swedish Open	(China) Chen Xingdong	(South Korea) Park Joo-bong (South Korea) Ra Kyung-min	4–15, 6–15	(silver) Runner-up
1996	Polish Open	(China) Chen Xingdong	(England) Nick Ponting (England) Joanne Goode	10–15, 15–12, 15–8	(gold) Winner
1996	Russian Open	(China) Chen Xingdong	(Denmark) Michael Søgaard (Denmark) Rikke Olsen	11–15, 15–12, 15–8	(gold) Winner
1996	China Open	(China) Chen Xingdong	(Denmark) Michael Søgaard (Denmark) Rikke Olsen	15–10, 15–4	(gold) Winner
