= 1996 Thomas & Uber Cup squads =

This article lists the squads for the 1996 Thomas & Uber Cup participating teams. The age listed for each player is on 16 May 1996 which was the first day of the tournament.

== Thomas Cup ==
=== Group A ===
==== China ====
Ten players represented China in the 1996 Thomas Cup.

Name	DoB/Age
Dong Jiong	20 August 1973 (aged 22)
Sun Jun	16 June 1975 (aged 20)
Lin Liwen	23 March 1969 (aged 27)
Chen Gang	27 June 1976 (aged 19)
Huang Zhanzhong	5 November 1968 (aged 27)
Jiang Xin	18 January 1969 (aged 27)
Liu Jianjun	5 January 1969 (aged 27)
Liu Yong	12 August 1975 (aged 20)
Ge Cheng	20 December 1973 (aged 22)
Tao Xiaoqiang	29 November 1973 (aged 22)

==== England ====
Eight players represented England in the 1996 Thomas Cup. Simon Archer withdrew from the squad due to preparations for the 1996 Summer Olympics.

Name	DoB/Age
Darren Hall	25 October 1965 (aged 30)
Peter Knowles	28 December 1969 (aged 26)
Peter Bush	27 October 1967 (aged 28)
Colin Haughton	12 November 1972 (aged 23)
Julian Robertson	9 October 1969 (aged 26)
Nathan Robertson	30 May 1977 (aged 18)
James Anderson	15 February 1974 (aged 22)
Chris Hunt	1 December 1968 (aged 27)
~~Simon Archer~~	27 June 1973 (aged 22)

==== Indonesia ====
Ten players represented Indonesia in the 1996 Thomas Cup.

Name	DoB/Age
Joko Suprianto	21 January 1966 (aged 30)
Hariyanto Arbi	27 January 1972 (aged 24)
Ardy Wiranata	10 February 1970 (aged 26)
Alan Budikusuma	29 March 1968 (aged 28)
Rexy Mainaky	9 March 1968 (aged 28)
Ricky Subagja	27 January 1971 (aged 25)
Antonius Ariantho	3 October 1973 (aged 22)
Denny Kantono	12 January 1970 (aged 26)
Rudy Gunawan	31 December 1966 (aged 29)
Bambang Suprianto	20 February 1969 (aged 27)

==== Sweden ====
Nine players represented Sweden in the 1996 Thomas Cup.

Name	DoB/Age
Jens Olsson	15 December 1964 (aged 31)
Tomas Johansson	12 August 1969 (aged 26)
Rickard Magnusson	10 January 1971 (aged 25)
Daniel Eriksson	24 July 1975 (aged 20)
Jesper Olsson	17 December 1969 (aged 26)
Pär-Gunnar Jönsson	6 August 1963 (aged 32)
Peter Axelsson	22 June 1967 (aged 28)
Henrik Andersson	19 January 1977 (aged 19)
Johan Tholinsson	10 July 1975 (aged 20)

=== Group B ===
==== Denmark ====
Ten players represented Denmark in the 1996 Thomas Cup.

Name	DoB/Age
Poul-Erik Høyer Larsen	20 September 1965 (aged 30)
Thomas Stuer-Lauridsen	29 April 1971 (aged 25)
Peter Rasmussen	2 August 1974 (aged 21)
Peter Gade	14 December 1976 (aged 19)
Michael Søgaard	4 February 1969 (aged 27)
Jon Holst-Christensen	16 June 1968 (aged 27)
Jim Laugesen	10 November 1974 (aged 21)
Henrik Svarrer	22 June 1964 (aged 31)
Thomas Lund	2 August 1968 (aged 27)
Thomas Stavngaard	7 December 1974 (aged 21)

==== Hong Kong ====
Ten players represented Hong Kong in the 1996 Thomas Cup.

Name	DoB/Age
Tam Kai Chuen	6 September 1976 (aged 19)
Tam Lok Tin	26 September 1976 (aged 19)
Liu Kwok Wa	15 February 1978 (aged 18)
Wong Kwok Wai	25 April 1974 (aged 22)
Ng Wei	14 July 1981 (aged 14)
Ma Chi Wai	19 October 1975 (aged 20)
Chan Siu Kwong	30 May 1966 (aged 29)
Tim He	14 April 1962 (aged 34)
Chow Kin Man	13 October 1970 (aged 25)
Ma Che Kong	25 May 1974 (aged 21)

==== Malaysia ====
Ten players represented Malaysia in the 1996 Thomas Cup.

Name	DoB/Age
Rashid Sidek	8 July 1968 (aged 27)
Ong Ewe Hock	14 March 1972 (aged 24)
Pang Chen	7 December 1972 (aged 23)
Yong Hock Kin	14 June 1974 (aged 21)
Cheah Soon Kit	9 January 1968 (aged 28)
Yap Kim Hock	2 August 1970 (aged 25)
Soo Beng Kiang	19 March 1968 (aged 28)
Tan Kim Her	11 November 1971 (aged 24)
Choong Tan Fook	6 February 1976 (aged 20)
Lee Wan Wah	24 November 1975 (aged 20)

==== South Korea ====
Ten players represented South Korea in the 1996 Thomas Cup.

Name	DoB/Age
Park Sung-woo	22 August 1971 (aged 24)
Lee Gwang-jin	5 December 1970 (aged 25)
Ahn Jae-chang	1 October 1972 (aged 23)
Kim Hak-kyun	15 November 1971 (aged 24)
Jang Chun-woong	24 April 1975 (aged 21)
Park Joo-bong	5 December 1964 (aged 31)
Kim Dong-moon	22 September 1975 (aged 20)
Yoo Yong-sung	25 October 1974 (aged 21)
Ha Tae-kwon	30 April 1975 (aged 21)
Kang Kyung-jin	24 March 1973 (aged 23)

== Uber Cup ==
=== Group A ===
==== China ====
Ten players represented China in the 1996 Uber Cup.

Name	DoB/Age
Ye Zhaoying	7 May 1974 (aged 22)
Han Jingna	16 January 1975 (aged 21)
Zhang Ning	19 May 1975 (aged 20)
Wang Chen	21 June 1976 (aged 19)
Ge Fei	9 October 1975 (aged 20)
Gu Jun	3 January 1975 (aged 21)
Chen Ying	1 December 1971 (aged 24)
Peng Xinyong	20 January 1973 (aged 23)
Qin Yiyuan	14 February 1973 (aged 23)
Tang Yongshu	5 January 1975 (aged 21)

==== Indonesia ====
Ten players represented Indonesia in the 1996 Uber Cup.

Name	DoB/Age
Susi Susanti	11 February 1971 (aged 25)
Mia Audina	22 August 1979 (aged 16)
Lidya Djaelawijaya	15 October 1974 (aged 21)
Yuliani Santosa	29 October 1971 (aged 24)
Meiluawati	25 May 1975 (aged 20)
Eliza Nathanael	27 May 1973 (aged 22)
Zelin Resiana	9 July 1972 (aged 23)
Finarsih	8 February 1972 (aged 24)
Lili Tampi	19 May 1970 (aged 25)
Deyana Lomban	27 January 1976 (aged 20)

==== Japan ====
Seven players represented Japan in the 1996 Uber Cup.

Name	DoB/Age
Hisako Mizui	29 March 1972 (aged 24)
Yasuko Mizui	19 September 1975 (aged 20)
Takako Ida	13 December 1972 (aged 23)
Tomomi Matsuo	15 August 1968 (aged 27)
Masako Sakamoto	10 October 1972 (aged 23)
Aiko Miyamura	11 August 1971 (aged 24)
Akiko Miyamura	14 October 1974 (aged 21)

==== Russia ====
Seven players represented Russia in the 1996 Uber Cup.

Name	DoB/Age
Elena Rybkina	24 April 1964 (aged 32)
Marina Yakusheva	19 June 1974 (aged 21)
Elena Sukhareva	6 December 1976 (aged 19)
Nadezhda Chervyakova	1970 (aged 25–26)
Ella Karachkova	5 August 1978 (aged 17)
Natalia Gorodnicheva	1976 (aged 19–20)
Irina Chernikova	14 December 1975 (aged 20)

=== Group B ===
==== Denmark ====
Ten players represented Denmark in the 1996 Uber Cup.

Name	DoB/Age
Camilla Martin	23 March 1974 (aged 22)
Anne Søndergaard	5 June 1973 (aged 22)
Mette Pedersen	30 September 1973 (aged 22)
Lotte Thomsen	22 November 1972 (aged 23)
Helene Kirkegaard	5 May 1971 (aged 25)
Rikke Olsen	19 April 1971 (aged 25)
Ann Jørgensen	1 October 1973 (aged 22)
Lotte Olsen	23 November 1966 (aged 29)
Marlene Thomsen	5 May 1971 (aged 25)
Lisbet Stuer-Lauridsen	22 September 1968 (aged 27)

==== England ====
Eight players represented England in the 1996 Uber Cup. Julie Bradbury and Joanne Wright withdrew from the squad.

Name	DoB/Age
Julia Mann	9 August 1971 (aged 24)
Alison Humby	7 December 1972 (aged 23)
Tanya Groves	7 October 1970 (aged 25)
Joanne Muggeridge	3 April 1969 (aged 27)
Gillian Gowers	9 April 1964 (aged 32)
Sarah Hardaker	1 December 1975 (aged 20)
Joanne Davies	10 September 1972 (aged 23)
Emma Chaffin	10 April 1975 (aged 21)
~~Julie Bradbury~~	12 February 1967 (aged 29)
~~Joanne Wright~~	17 November 1972 (aged 23)

==== Hong Kong ====
Nine players represented Hong Kong in the 1996 Uber Cup.

Name	DoB/Age
Ng Ching	5 April 1977 (aged 19)
Zhou Xin	23 August 1962 (aged 33)
Chan Hiu Fung	21 January 1970 (aged 26)
Koon Wai Chee	26 July 1980 (aged 15)
Chan Mei Mei	5 February 1978 (aged 18)
Chan Oi Ni	15 May 1966 (aged 30)
Tung Chau Man	14 October 1972 (aged 23)
Cheung Wai Yin	1978 (aged 17–18)
Yeung Chin	1975 (aged 20–21)

==== South Korea ====
Nine players represented South Korea in the 1996 Uber Cup.

Name	DoB/Age
Bang Soo-hyun	13 September 1972 (aged 23)
Kim Ji-hyun	10 September 1974 (aged 21)
Ra Kyung-min	25 November 1976 (aged 19)
Lee Joo-hyun	13 March 1974 (aged 22)
Gil Young-ah	10 June 1970 (aged 25)
Jang Hye-ock	9 February 1977 (aged 19)
Kim Shin-young	10 July 1975 (aged 20)
Park Soo-yun	27 November 1974 (aged 21)
Kim Mee-hyang	1 October 1973 (aged 22)
Chung Jae-hee	6 April 1978 (aged 18)
