= Nicole van Hooren =

Dutch badminton player

Personal information
- Born: Nicole Gerarda Everdina van Hooren; 11 June 1973 (age 53) 's-Hertogenbosch, Netherlands
- Height: 1.70 m (5 ft 7 in)
- Weight: 90 kg (198 lb)

Sport
- Country: Netherlands
- Sport: Badminton
- Handedness: Right
- Event: Women's & mixed doubles

Women's & mixed doubles
- BWF profile
Medal record
Women's badminton
Representing Netherlands
European Championships
Bronze medal – third place	2000 Glasgow	Women's doubles
Bronze medal – third place	2000 Glasgow	Mixed team
European Junior Championships
Silver medal – second place	1991 Budapest	Mixed doubles
Silver medal – second place	1991 Budapest	Mixed team
Bronze medal – third place	1991 Budapest	Girls' doubles

Nicole Gerarda Everdina van Hooren (born 11 June 1973) is a Dutch badminton player. She and Lotte Jonathans who were partnered since February 1998, competed at the 2000 Summer Olympics in Sydney, Australia, where the duo reached the quarter-finals, but lost to the Chinese pair of Huang Nanyan and Yang Wei.

== Achievements ==
=== European Championships ===
Women's doubles
Year	Venue	Partner	Opponent	Score	Result
2000	Kelvin Hall, Glasgow, Scotland	(Netherlands) Lotte Jonathans	(Denmark) Helene Kirkegaard (Denmark) Rikke Olsen	6–15, 1–15	Bronze

=== European Junior Championships ===
Girls' doubles
Year	Venue	Partner	Opponent	Score	Result
1991	BMTE-Törley impozáns sportcsarnokában, Budapest, Hungary	(Netherlands) Brenda Conjin	(England) Alison Humby (England) Joanne Wright	10–15, 5–15	Bronze

Mixed doubles
Year	Venue	Partner	Opponent	Score	Result
1991	BMTE-Törley impozáns sportcsarnokában, Budapest, Hungary	(Netherlands) Joris van Soerland	(Denmark) Peter Christensen (Denmark) Rikke Broen	15–6, 10–15, 5–15	Silver

=== IBF World Grand Prix ===
The World Badminton Grand Prix was sanctioned by the International Badminton Federation from 1983 to 2006.

Women's doubles
Year	Tournament	Partner	Opponent	Score	Result
2000	Indonesia Open	(Netherlands) Lotte Jonathans	(England) Joanne Goode (England) Donna Kellogg	15–7, 12–15, 10–15	(silver) Runner-up

=== IBF International ===
Women's doubles
Year	Tournament	Partner	Opponent	Score	Result
1993	Wimbledon International	(Netherlands) Erica van den Heuvel	(China) Ge Fei (China) Gu Jun	5–15, 6–15	(silver) Runner-up
1996	Welsh International	(Netherlands) Brenda Conijn	(England) Sara Hardaker (Wales) Kelly Morgan	6–15, 15–10, 15–4	(gold) Winner
1996	La Chaux-de-Fonds International	(Netherlands) Brenda Conijn	(England) Emma Constable (England) Sara Hardaker	15–6, 15–11	(gold) Winner
1996	French International	(Netherlands) Brenda Conijn	(Scotland) Jillian Haldane (Scotland) Elinor Middlemiss	15–17, 15–6, 15–9	(gold) Winner
1997	Amor International	(Netherlands) Brenda Conijn	(Netherlands) Monique Hoogland (Netherlands) Erica van den Heuvel	4–9, 8–11, 7–9	(silver) Runner-up
1998	Amor International	(Netherlands) Lotte Jonathans	(Denmark) Britta Andersen (Denmark) Lene Mørk	15–6, 15–3	(gold) Winner
2001	French International	(Netherlands) Erica van den Heuvel	(Russia) Irina Ruslyakova (Russia) Marina Yakusheva	7–0, 4–7, 7–1, 6–8, 7–4	(gold) Winner
2001	Dutch International	(Netherlands) Erica van den Heuvel	(Scotland) Sandra Watt (Scotland) Yuan Wemyss	15–4, 15–7	(gold) Winner
2001	Croatian International	(Netherlands) Erica van den Heuvel	(Denmark) Britta Andersen (Denmark) Lene Mørk	15–9, 15–12	(gold) Winner

Mixed doubles
Year	Tournament	Partner	Opponent	Score	Result
1991	Amor International	(Netherlands) Alex Meijer	(Denmark) Martin Lundgaard Hansen (Denmark) Rikke Broen	15–9, 15–11	(gold) Winner
1993	Amor International	(Netherlands) Quinten van Dalm	(Indonesia) Paulus Firman (Indonesia) S. Herawati	15–3, 15–8	(gold) Winner
1995	Amor International	(Netherlands) Ron Michels	(Denmark) Janek Roos (Denmark) Charlotte Madsen	12–15, 12–15	(silver) Runner-up
1996	Austrian International	(Netherlands) Quinten van Dalm	(Ukraine) Vladislav Druzchenko (Ukraine) Viktoria Evtuschenko	4–15, 8–15	(silver) Runner-up
1996	Welsh International	(Netherlands) Quinten van Dalm	(England) Ian Pearson (England) Joanne Wright	18–14, 15–2	(gold) Winner
1997	Amor International	(Netherlands) Quinten van Dalm	(Denmark) Jonas Rasmussen (Denmark) Ann-Lou Jørgensen	11–9, 9–3, 7–9, 7–9, 9–7	(gold) Winner
1997	Austrian International	(Netherlands) Quinten van Dalm	(Germany) Michael Keck (Germany) Karen Stechmann	8–15, 4–15	(silver) Runner-up
1998	Amor International	(Netherlands) Dennis Lens	(Netherlands) Norbert van Barneveld (Netherlands) Lotte Jonathans	18–15, 15–12	(gold) Winner
