= Monique Hoogland =

Dutch badminton player

Personal information
- Born: 25 August 1967 (age 59) The Hague, Netherlands
- Height: 1.73 m (5 ft 8 in)

Sport
- Country: Netherlands
- Sport: Badminton
- Handedness: Right
- Coached by: Martjin van Dooremalen; Huub Franssen
- Event: Women's singles & doubles

Women's singles & doubles
- BWF profile
Medal record
Women's badminton
Representing Netherlands
European Championships
| Bronze medal – third place | 1998 Sofia | Women's doubles |

Monique Hoogland (born 25 August 1967) is a Dutch retired badminton player from Duinwijck club. Hoogland along with Erica van den Heuvel, won the bronze in Women's doubles at the 1998 European Championships. She is also a 5-time former National champion. During her training session in 1996 for Olympic qualification at the Amersfoort in the Netherlands, she completely tore of her Achilles tendon and missed the Olympic games due to severity of injury.

== Achievements ==
=== European Championships ===
Women's doubles
| Year | Venue | Partner | Opponent | Score | Result |
|---|---|---|---|---|---|
| 1998 | Winter Sports Palace; Sofia, Bulgaria | (Netherlands) Erica van den Heuvel | (Denmark) Ann Jørgensen (Denmark) Majken Vange | 15–12, 16–18, 7–15 | Bronze |

=== IBF World Grand Prix ===
The World Badminton Grand Prix has been sanctioned by the International Badminton Federation since 1983.

Women's doubles
| Year | Tournament | Partner | Opponent | Score | Result |
|---|---|---|---|---|---|
| 1997 | Dutch Open | (Netherlands) Erica van den Heuvel | (Denmark) Pernille Harder (Wales) Kelly Morgan | 9–15, 9–15 | (silver) Runner-up |

=== IBF International ===
Women's singles
| Year | Tournament | Opponent | Score | Result |
|---|---|---|---|---|
| 1984 | Swiss Open | (Switzerland) Liselotte Blumer | 5–11, 4–11 | (silver) Runner-up |
| 1986 | Swiss Open | (Canada) Suneeta Khare | 11–8, 12–10 | (gold) Winner |
| 1987 | Austrian International | (Netherlands) Astrid van der Knaap | –, – | (silver) Runner-up |
| 1987 | Swiss Open | (Netherlands) Astrid van der Knaap | 7–11, 11–7, 4–11 | (silver) Runner-up |
| 1993 | Amor International | (Denmark) Camilla Martin | 5–11, 7–11 | (silver) Runner-up |
| 1994 | Amor International | (Austria) Irina Serova | 8–11, 5–11 | (silver) Runner-up |
| 1994 | Hamburg International | (Denmark) Camilla Martin | 3–11, 2–11 | (silver) Runner-up |
| 1995 | Amor International | (Netherlands) Caroline Glebbeek | 12–9, 11–6 | (gold) Winner |
| 1995 | BMW International | –, – | –, – | (gold) Winner |
| 1996 | Austrian International | (Denmark) Mette Pedersen | 4–11, 7–11 | (silver) Runner-up |
| 1997 | Amor International | (Netherlands) Caroline Glebbeek | 9–7, 9–3, 2–9, 8–11, 9–7 | (gold) Winner |

Women's doubles
| Year | Tournament | Partner | Opponent | Score | Result |
|---|---|---|---|---|---|
| 1984 | Swiss Open | (Netherlands) Erica van den Heuvel | (Switzerland) Liselotte Blumer (Denmark) Lisbeth Koch | 15–9, 15–10 | (gold) Winner |
| 1984 | Hungarian International | (Netherlands) Erica van den Heuvel | (Germany) Mechtild Hagemann (Germany) Cathrin Hoppe | –, – | (gold) Winner |
| 1986 | Swiss Open | (Netherlands) Paula Kloet | (Canada) Chantal Jobin (Canada) Doris Piché | 15–8, 15–9 | (gold) Winner |
| 1987 | Austrian International | (Netherlands) Erica van den Heuvel | (Poland) Bożena Haracz (Poland) Bożena Siemieniec | –, – | (gold) Winner |
| 1987 | Swiss Open | (Netherlands) Paula Kloet | (Germany) Heidemarie Krickhaus (Germany) Katrin Schmidt | 4–15, 10–15 | (silver) Runner-up |
| 1997 | La Chaux-de-Fonds | (Netherlands) Erica van den Heuvel | (England) Emma Constable (England) Sara Hardaker | 15–12, 15–12 | (gold) Winner |
| 1997 | Amor International | (Netherlands) Erica van den Heuvel | (Netherlands) Brenda Conjin (Netherlands) Nicole van Hooren | 9–4, 11–8, 9–7 | (gold) Winner |

Mixed doubles
| Year | Tournament | Partner | Opponent | Score | Result |
|---|---|---|---|---|---|
| 1986 | Swiss Open | (Netherlands) Ron Michels | (Netherlands) Alex Meijer (Netherlands) Paula Kloet | 4–15, 14–18 | (silver) Runner-up |
| 1987 | Swiss Open | (Netherlands) Alex Meijer | (Germany) Harald Klauer (Germany) Katrin Schmidt | 18–17, 15–12 | (gold) Winner |
