= Simon Archer (badminton) =

British badminton player (born 1973)

Simon Archer MBE
Personal information
- Nickname: Arch
- Born: Simon David Archer; 27 June 1973 (age 53) Worcester, Worcestershire, England

Sport
- Country: England
- Sport: Badminton
- Handedness: Right

Men's & mixed doubles
- Highest ranking: 1
- BWF profile
Medal record
Men's badminton
Representing Great Britain
Olympic Games
Bronze medal – third place	2000 Sydney	Mixed doubles
Representing England
World Championships
Silver medal – second place	1999 Copenhagen	Mixed doubles
Bronze medal – third place	1999 Copenhagen	Men's doubles
Commonwealth Games
Gold medal – first place	1994 Victoria	Mixed team
Gold medal – first place	1998 Kuala Lumpur	Mixed doubles
Gold medal – first place	2002 Manchester	Mixed doubles
Gold medal – first place	2002 Manchester	Mixed team
Silver medal – second place	1994 Victoria	Men's doubles
Silver medal – second place	1994 Victoria	Mixed doubles
Silver medal – second place	2006 Melbourne	Mixed team
Bronze medal – third place	1998 Kuala Lumpur	Men's doubles
Bronze medal – third place	1998 Kuala Lumpur	Men's team
Bronze medal – third place	2002 Manchester	Men's doubles
European Championships
Gold medal – first place	1994 Den Bosch	Men's doubles
Gold medal – first place	1998 Sofia	Men's doubles
Silver medal – second place	1996 Herning	Mixed doubles
Bronze medal – third place	1996 Herning	Men's doubles
Bronze medal – third place	1998 Sofia	Mixed doubles
Bronze medal – third place	2000 Glasgow	Men's doubles
European Mixed Team Championships
Silver medal – second place	1998 Sofia	Mixed team
Silver medal – second place	2000 Glasgow	Mixed team
Silver medal – second place	2002 Malmö	Mixed team
Bronze medal – third place	1994 Den Bosch	Mixed team
Bronze medal – third place	1996 Herning	Mixed team
Bronze medal – third place	2006 Den Bosch	Mixed team
European Junior Championships
Bronze medal – third place	1991 Budapest	Boys' singles
Bronze medal – third place	1991 Budapest	Mixed doubles

Simon David Archer MBE (born 27 June 1973) is an English former badminton player. Archer once held the world record for the fastest smash at 162 mph.

== Career ==
=== Summer Olympics ===
Archer competed in badminton at the 1996 Summer Olympics in doubles, with Chris Hunt. They were knocked out in the quarterfinals. In 2000 he coupled with Nathan Robertson, but they too lost in the quarterfinals, this time to Tony Gunawan and Candra Wijaya of Indonesia. However, Archer also competed in mixed doubles with Joanne Goode and won a bronze medal.

=== Commonwealth Games ===
He represented England and won double silver in the mixed doubles and men's doubles event and was a member of the mixed team that won the gold medal, at the 1994 Commonwealth Games in Victoria, Canada.

Archer and Goode won gold medals twice at the Commonwealth Games in 1998 and 2002. Archer also won bronze medals in men's doubles in both these Games, together with Chris Hunt and James Anderson respectively.

=== Retirement ===
In August 2006 Archer announced, that he will no longer compete on international level. However he still plays county badminton for Worcestershire and has had an offer to play for a club in Germany.

== Awards ==
Archer was awarded a world record by the Guinness World Records in 1997, for his smash that reached 162 mph.

== Personal life ==
Archer was appointed Member of the Order of the British Empire (MBE) in the 2004 Queen's Birthday Honours.

== Achievements ==
=== Olympic Games ===
Mixed doubles
Year	Venue	Partner	Opponent	Score	Result
2000	The Dome, Sydney, Australia	(United Kingdom) Joanne Goode	(Denmark) Michael Søgaard (Denmark) Rikke Olsen	15–4, 12–15, 17–14	Bronze

=== World Championships ===
Men's doubles
Year	Venue	Partner	Opponent	Score	Result
1999	Brøndby Arena, Copenhagen, Denmark	(England) Nathan Robertson	(South Korea) Lee Dong-soo (South Korea) Yoo Yong-sung	11–15, 8–15	Bronze

Mixed doubles
Year	Venue	Partner	Opponent	Score	Result
1999	Brøndby Arena, Copenhagen, Denmark	(England) Joanne Goode	(South Korea) Kim Dong-moon (South Korea) Ra Kyung-min	10–15, 13–15	Silver

=== Commonwealth Games ===
Men's doubles
Year	Venue	Partner	Opponent	Score	Result
1994	McKinnon Gym, University of Victoria, Victoria, Canada	(England) Chris Hunt	(Malaysia) Cheah Soon Kit (Malaysia) Soo Beng Kiang	10–15, 9–15	Silver
1998	Kuala Lumpur Badminton Stadium, Kuala Lumpur, Malaysia	(England) Chris Hunt	(Malaysia) Choong Tan Fook (Malaysia) Lee Wan Wah	13–15, 11–15	Bronze
2002	Bolton Arena, Manchester, England	(England) James Anderson	(Malaysia) Chan Chong Ming (Malaysia) Chew Choon Eng	4–7, 5–7, 2–7	Bronze

Mixed doubles
Year	Venue	Partner	Opponent	Score	Result
1994	McKinnon Gym, University of Victoria, Victoria, Canada	(England) Julie Bradbury	(England) Chris Hunt (England) Gillian Clark	11–15, 4–15	Silver
1998	Kuala Lumpur Badminton Stadium, Kuala Lumpur, Malaysia	(England) Joanne Goode	(England) Nathan Robertson (England) Joanne Davies	15–2, 15–5	Gold
2002	Bolton Arena, Manchester, England	(England) Joanne Goode	(Malaysia) Chew Choon Eng (Malaysia) Chin Eei Hui	0–7, 7–5, 7–3, 7–3	Gold

=== European Championships ===
Men's doubles
Year	Venue	Partner	Opponent	Score	Result
1994	Maaspoort, Den Bosch, Netherlands	(England) Chris Hunt	(Russia) Andrey Antropov (Russia) Nikolai Zuyev	18–16, 15–4	Gold
1996	Herning Badminton Klub, Herning, Denmark	(England) Chris Hunt	(Denmark) Jon Holst-Christensen (Denmark) Thomas Lund	6–15, 10–15	Silver
1998	Winter Sports Palace, Sofia, Bulgaria	(England) Chris Hunt	(Sweden) Peter Axelsson (Sweden) Pär-Gunnar Jönsson	15–3, 15–3	Gold
2000	Kelvin Hall International Sports Arena, Glasgow, Scotland	(England) Nathan Robertson	(Denmark) Jens Eriksen (Denmark) Jesper Larsen	13–15, 15–7, 3–15	Bronze

Mixed doubles
Year	Venue	Partner	Opponent	Score	Result
1996	Herning Badminton Klub, Herning, Denmark	(England) Julie Bradbury	(Denmark) Michael Søgaard (Denmark) Rikke Olsen	16–18, 2–15	Silver
1998	Winter Sports Palace, Sofia, Bulgaria	(England) Joanne Goode	(Germany) Michael Keck (Netherlands) Erica van den Heuvel	15–8, 11–15, 8–15	Bronze

=== European Junior Championships ===
Boys' singles
Year	Venue	Opponent	Score	Result
1991	BMTE-Törley impozáns sportcsarnokában, Budapest, Hungary	(Austria) Jürgen Koch	15–11, 12–15, 8–15	Bronze

Mixed doubles
Year	Venue	Partner	Opponent	Score	Result
1991	BMTE-Törley impozáns sportcsarnokában, Budapest, Hungary	(England) Joanne Davies	(Netherlands) Joris van Soerland (Netherlands) Nicole van Hooren	11–15, 4–15	Bronze

=== IBF World Grand Prix ===
The World Badminton Grand Prix was sanctioned by the International Badminton Federation from 1983 to 2006.

Men's doubles
Year	Tournament	Partner	Opponent	Score	Result
1994	Dutch Open	(England) Chris Hunt	(Indonesia) Antonius Ariantho (Indonesia) Denny Kantono	18–17, 5–15, 8–15	(silver) Runner-up
1995	Swiss Open	(England) Chris Hunt	(Denmark) Jon Holst-Christensen (Denmark) Thomas Lund	6–15, 7–15	(silver) Runner-up
1996	Denmark Open	(England) Chris Hunt	(Denmark) Jim Laugesen (Denmark) Thomas Stavngaard	15–17, 15–10, 7–15	(silver) Runner-up
1997	German Open	(England) Chris Hunt	(Denmark) Jens Eriksen (Denmark) Jesper Larsen	4–15, 8–15	(silver) Runner-up

Mixed doubles
Year	Tournament	Partner	Opponent	Score	Result
1994	Denmark Open	(England) Julie Bradbury	(Denmark) Thomas Lund (Denmark) Marlene Thomsen	8–15, 3–15	(silver) Runner-up
1996	Korea Open	(England) Julie Bradbury	(South Korea) Park Joo-bong (South Korea) Ra Kyung-min	9–15, 11–15	(silver) Runner-up
1996	Swiss Open	(England) Julie Bradbury	(Sweden) Jan-Eric Antonsson (Sweden) Astrid Crabo	7–15, 15–12, 11–15	(silver) Runner-up
1996	All England Open	(England) Julie Bradbury	(South Korea) Park Joo-bong (South Korea) Ra Kyung-min	10–15, 10–15	(silver) Runner-up
1998	Hong Kong Open	(England) Joanne Goode	(Denmark) Michael Søgaard (Denmark) Rikke Olsen	15–8, 7–15, 8–15	(silver) Runner-up
1999	All England Open	(England) Joanne Goode	(South Korea) Ha Tae-kwon (South Korea) Chung Jae-hee	15–2, 15–13	(gold) Winner
1999	Swiss Open	(England) Joanne Goode	(Denmark) Michael Søgaard (Denmark) Rikke Olsen	15–5, 15–4	(gold) Winner
2000	Thailand Open	(England) Joanne Goode	(China) Zhang Jun (China) Gao Ling	13–15, 12–15	(silver) Runner-up
2000	Indonesia Open	(England) Joanne Goode	(Denmark) Michael Søgaard (Denmark) Rikke Olsen	15–13, 11–15, 15–4	(gold) Winner
2000	Dutch Open	(Netherlands) Erica van den Heuvel	(China) Chen Qiqiu (China) Chen Lin	15–8, 12–15, 10–15	(silver) Runner-up
2002	U.S. Open	(Sweden) Marina Andrievskaya	(United States) Tony Gunawan (United States) Etty Tantri	11–7, 4–11, 6–11	(silver) Runner-up

=== IBF International ===
Men's doubles
Year	Tournament	Partner	Opponent	Score	Result
1991	Portugal International	(England) Chris Hunt	(England) Andy Goode (England) Glen Milton	7–15, 15–2, 10–15	(silver) Runner-up
1992	Iceland International	(England) Julian Robertson	(Scotland) Russell Hogg (Scotland) Kenny Middlemiss	15–9, 15–9	(gold) Winner
1993	Austrian International	(England) Nick Ponting	(Netherlands) Edwin van Dalm (Netherlands) Quinten van Dalm	15–5, 15–5	(gold) Winner
1993	Hamburg Cup	(England) Chris Hunt	(Denmark) Jon Holst-Christensen (Denmark) Thomas Lund	8–15, 11–15	(silver) Runner-up
1993	Wimbledon Open	(England) Chris Hunt	(Russia) Sergei Melnikov (Russia) Nikolai Zuyev	6–15, 15–7, 15–5	(gold) Winner
1993	Welsh International	(England) Mike Adams	(Russia) Sergei Melnikov (Russia) Nikolai Zuyev	15–3, 15–5	(gold) Winner
1993	Irish International	(England) Julian Robertson	(England) Neil Cottrill (England) John Quinn	15–10, 15–6	(gold) Winner
2002	BMW Open International	(England) Flandy Limpele	(England) Anthony Clark (England) Nathan Robertson	15–5, 17–14	(gold) Winner
2004	Portugal International	(England) Robert Blair	(Hong Kong) Liu Kwok Wa (Hong Kong) Albertus Susanto Njoto	15–9, 12–15, 15–7	(gold) Winner
2004	Bitburger Open	(England) Anthony Clark	(France) Jean-Michel Lefort (France) Svetoslav Stoyanov	15–5, 15–7	(gold) Winner
2005	Portugal International	(England) Anthony Clark	(Japan) Keishi Kawaguchi (Japan) Toru Matsumoto	17–15, 15–4	(gold) Winner
2005	Swedish International	(England) Anthony Clark	(Sweden) Henrik Andersson (Sweden) Fredrik Bergström	Walkover	(gold) Winner
2005	Italian International	(England) David Lindley	(Denmark) Anders Kristiansen (Denmark) Simon Mollyhus	10–15, 15–9, 13–15	(silver) Runner-up

Mixed doubles
Year	Tournament	Partner	Opponent	Score	Result
1992	Austrian International	(Denmark) Maria Rasmussen	(Sweden) Nicklas Johansson (Sweden) Jessica Reinholdsson	15–3, 15–2	(gold) Winner
1992	Wimbledon Open	(England) Joanne Davies	(England) Dave Wright (England) Sara Sankey	15–5, 12–15, 11–15	(silver) Runner-up
1993	Welsh International	(England) Joanne Davies	(England) Chris Hunt (England) Joanne Wright	9–15, 8–15	(silver) Runner-up
1993	Irish International	(England) Joanne Davies	(England) Julian Robertson (England) Sara Hardaker	15–5, 15–10	(gold) Winner
2003	Austrian International	(England) Donna Kellogg	(Sweden) Fredrik Bergström (Sweden) Johanna Persson	11–6, 5–11, 11–6	(gold) Winner
2003	Slovenian International	(England) Donna Kellogg	(Russia) Nikolai Zuyev (Russia) Marina Yakusheva	15–2, 17–16	(gold) Winner
2003	Iceland International	(England) Donna Kellogg	(Denmark) Jesper Larsen (Denmark) Mie Nielsen	15–13, 15–4	(gold) Winner
2003	Scottish International	(England) Donna Kellogg	(Sweden) Imanuel Hirschfeldt (Sweden) Frida Andreasson	15–5, 15–3	(gold) Winner
2003	Irish International	(England) Donna Kellogg	(Denmark) Rasmus Andersen (Denmark) Kamilla Rytter Juhl	15–12, 15–4	(gold) Winner
2004	Portugal International	(England) Donna Kellogg	(Germany) Kristof Hopp (Germany) Kathrin Piotrowski	15–12, 15–12	(gold) Winner
