= Rikke Broen =

Danish badminton player

Personal information
- Born: 13 October 1972 (age 54)

Sport
- Country: Denmark
- Sport: Badminton
- Handedness: Right
- Event: Doubles

Doubles
- BWF profile
Medal record
Women's badminton
Representing Denmark
European Junior Championships
Gold medal – first place	1991 Budapest	Mixed doubles
Bronze medal – third place	1991 Budapest	Mixed team

Rikke Broen Magersholt (born 13 October 1972) is a Danish badminton player.

== Career Summary ==
- Danish Junior champion, WD, together with Marianne Rasmussen, U15, 1985–86
- Danish Junior champion, WD, together with Camilla Martin / Højbjerg, U17, 1988–1989
- Nordic Junior champion, MD, together with Peter Christensen / Højbjerg, U19, 1990
- Nordic Junior champion, WD, together with Camilla Martin / Højbjerg, U19, 1990
- Nordic Junior champion, XD, together with Peter Christensen / Højbjerg, U19, 1991)
- European Junior champion, XD, together with Peter Christensen / Højbjerg, U19, 1991

In her senior international career, Broen won the Norwegian International in 1991, the Amor International (held in Netherlands) in 1996, Slovak International in 1996 and 1997, the Strasbourg International (held in France) in 1997 and the Hungarian International in 1998.

== Achievements ==
=== European Junior Championships ===
Mixed doubles
Year	Venue	Partner	Opponent	Score	Result
1991	BMTE-Törley impozáns sportcsarnokában Budapest, Hungary	(Denmark) Peter Christensen	(Netherlands) Joris van Soerland (Netherlands) Nicole van Hooren	6–15, 15–10, 15–5	Gold

=== IBF International ===
Women's doubles
Year	Tournament	Partner	Opponent	Score	Result
1991	Austrian International	(Denmark) Marianne Rasmussen	(Commonwealth of Independent States) Vlada Chernyavskaya (Commonwealth of Independent States) Elena Rybkina	7–15, 7–15	(silver) Runner-up
1991	Norwegian International	(Denmark) Marianne Rasmussen	(Commonwealth of Independent States) Natalia Ivanova (Commonwealth of Independent States) Elena Rybkina	15–11, 15–12	(gold) Winner
1992	Polish International	(Denmark) Anne Søndergaard	(Commonwealth of Independent States) Marina Andrievskaya (Commonwealth of Independent States) Marina Yakusheva	4–15, 5–15	(silver) Runner-up
1992	Norwegian International	(Denmark) Helene Kirkegaard	(Denmark) Anne Mette Bille (Denmark) Trine Pedersen	11–15, 6–15	(silver) Runner-up
1995	Strasbourg International	(Denmark) Joanne Mogensen			(gold) Winner
1996	Slovak International	(Denmark) Sara Runesten	(Denmark) Sarah Jonsson (Denmark) Tanja Berg	15–8, 6–15, 15–4	(gold) Winner
1996	Strasbourg International	(Denmark) Helle Stærmose	(France) Sandrine Lefèvre (France) Tatiana Vattier	15–3, 15–7	(gold) Winner
1998	Hungarian International	(Denmark) Sara Petersen	(Denmark) Britta Andersen (Denmark) Lene Mørk	15–3, 15–8	(gold) Winner

Mixed doubles
Year	Tournament	Partner	Opponent	Score	Result
1991	Amor International	(Denmark) Martin Lundgaard Hansen	(Netherlands) Alex Meijer (Netherlands) Nicole van Hooren	9–15, 11–15	(silver) Runner-up
1992	Polish International	(Denmark) Max Gandrup	(Denmark) Christian Jakobsen (Denmark) Marianne Rasmussen	5–15, 1–15	(silver) Runner-up
1992	Norwegian International	(Denmark) Thomas Damgaard	(Denmark) Lars Pedersen (Denmark) Anne Mette Bille	17–18, 17–16, 5–15	(silver) Runner-up
1995	Strasbourg International	(Denmark) Jesper Hermansen			(gold) Winner
1996	Amor International	(Denmark) Allan Borch	(England) James Anderson (England) Emma Constable	15–10, 15–10	(gold) Winner
1997	Strasbourg International	(Denmark) Janek Roos	(France) Vincent Laigle (France) Sandrine Lefèvre	15–7, 15–4	(gold) Winner
1997	Slovak International	(Denmark) Michael Lamp	(Slovenia) Andrej Pohar (Slovenia) Maja Pohar	15–6, 15–2	(gold) Winner
