= Joanne Davies =

English badminton player

Personal information
- Born: 10 September 1972 (age 54)
- Height: 1.60 m (5 ft 3 in)
- Weight: 58 kg (128 lb)

Sport
- Country: England
- Sport: Badminton
- Handedness: Right

Women's & mixed doubles
- Highest ranking: 8
- BWF profile
Medal record
Women's badminton
Representing England
Commonwealth Games
Gold medal – first place	1998 Kuala lumpur	Women's team
Silver medal – second place	1998 Kuala lumpur	Mixed doubles
European Junior Championships
Bronze medal – third place	1991 Budapest	Mixed doubles

Joanne Davies (born 10 September 1972) is a former English badminton player, capped 44 times for England and reached No. 8 in the World.

== Early life ==
She lived on Yarborough Road in Grimsby, and attended the Whitgift School.

== Career ==
She has won team gold and individual silver medals in the 1998 Commonwealth Games. She represented Great Britain at the 2000 Summer Olympics in Sydney, Australia. Davies was 11 weeks pregnant while she competing in Sydney. Davies married former Dutch national badminton player Jurgen van Leeuwen, and her son Ethan also played badminton.

She was the English National runner-up with her doubles partner Nichola Beck during the 1995 English National Championships.

== Achievements ==
=== Commonwealth Games ===
Mixed doubles
Year	Venue	Partner	Opponent	Score	Result
1998	Kuala Lumpur Badminton Stadium; Kuala Lumpur, Malaysia	(England) Nathan Robertson	(England) Simon Archer (England) Joanne Goode	2–15, 5–15	Silver

=== European Junior Championships ===
Mixed doubles
Year	Venue	Partner	Opponent	Score	Result
1991	BMTE-Törley impozáns sportcsarnokában Budapest, Hungary	(England) Simon Archer	(Netherlands) Joris van Soerland (Netherlands) Nicole van Hooren	11–15, 4–15	Bronze

=== IBF World Grand Prix ===
The World Badminton Grand Prix sanctioned by International Badminton Federation (IBF) since 1983.

Women's doubles
Year	Tournament	Partner	Opponent	Score	Result
1996	Brunei Open	(England) Nichola Beck	(Thailand) Thitikan Duangsiri (Thailand) Pornsawan Plungwech	8–15, 11–15	(silver) Runner-up

=== IBF International ===
Women's doubles
Year	Tournament	Partner	Opponent	Score	Result
1992	Portugal International	(England) Joanne Wright	(Commonwealth of Independent States) Marina Andrievskaya (Commonwealth of Independent States) Elena Rybkina	15–4, 15–2	(gold) Winner
1992	Czechoslovakian International	(England) Tanya Woodward	(England) Sarah Hore (England) Alison Humby	17–16, 15–10	(gold) Winner
1992	Hungarian International	(England) Tanya Woodward	(England) Alison Humby (England) Julia Mann	15–7, 15–5	(gold) Winner
1993	Hamburg Cup	(England) Joanne Wright	(Denmark) Anne Mette Bille (Denmark) Marlene Thomsen	7–15, 5–15	(silver) Runner-up
1993	Welsh International	(England) Joanne Muggeridge	(England) Julie Bradbury (England) Joanne Wright	9–15, 4–15	(silver) Runner-up
1993	Irish International	(England) Nichola Beck	(England) Karen Peatfield (England) Justine Willmott	15–1, 15–4	(gold) Winner
1994	Mauritius International	(England) Tanya Woodward	(Malaysia) Norhasikin Amin (Malaysia) Winnie Lee	15–8, 15–10	(gold) Winner
1996	Finnish International	(England) Nichola Beck	(Wales) Kelly Morgan (England) Joanne Muggeridge	3–15, 10–15	(silver) Runner-up
1999	Spanish International	(England) Gail Emms	(Japan) Takae Masumo (Japan) Chikako Nakayama	12–15, 11–15	(silver) Runner-up
2000	Portugal International	(England) Sara Hardaker	(Denmark) Britta Andersen (Denmark) Lene Mørk	12–15, 12–15	(silver) Runner-up
2000	Canadian International	(England) Sara Hardaker	(Japan) Naomi Murakami (Japan) Hiromi Yamada	3–15, 17–15, 15–8	(gold) Winner

Mixed doubles
Year	Tournament	Partner	Opponent	Score	Result
1992	Wimbledon Open	(England) Simon Archer	(England) Dave Wright (England) Sara Sankey	15–5, 12–15, 11–15	(silver) Runner-up
1992	Irish International	(England) Nick Ponting	(Denmark) Lars Pedersen (Denmark) Anne Mette Bille	7–15, 11–15	(silver) Runner-up
1993	Welsh International	(England) Simon Archer	(England) Chris Hunt (England) Joanne Wright	9–15, 8–15	(silver) Runner-up
1993	Irish International	(England) Simon Archer	(England) Julian Robertson (England) Sara Hardaker	15–5, 15–10	(gold) Winner
1994	Mauritius International	(England) Michael Adams	(England) Dave Wright (England) Karen Chapman	15–11, 15–9	(gold) Winner
1995	Wimbledon International	(England) Ian Pearson	(Russia) Nikolai Zuyev (Russia) Marina Yakusheva	15–12, 11–15, 15–5	(gold) Winner
