= Christian Jakobsen (badminton) =

Danish badminton player

Personal information
- Born: 27 August 1971 (age 55) Horsens, Midtjylland, Denmark
- Height: 1.84 m (6 ft 0 in)
- Weight: 72 kg (159 lb)

Sport
- Country: Denmark
- Sport: Badminton
- Handedness: Right
- Event: Men's doubles & Mixed doubles

Men's doubles & Mixed doubles
- BWF profile
Medal record
Men's badminton
Representing Denmark
European Championships
Silver medal – second place	1994 Den Bosch	Mixed doubles
Bronze medal – third place	1994 Den Bosch	Men's doubles
European Mixed Team Championships
Silver medal – second place	1994 Den Bosch	Mixed team
European Junior Championships
Gold medal – first place	1989 Manchester	Boys' doubles
Gold medal – first place	1989 Manchester	Mixed doubles
Gold medal – first place	1989 Manchester	Mixed team

Christian Jakobsen (born 27 August 1971) is a Danish badminton player. Jakobsen competed in two events at the 1996 Summer Olympics. He lost in round of 16 with Henrik Svarrer in men's doubles and in mixed doubles with Lotte Olsen. Nowadays, he is a chairman of Horsens badminton klub (HBK) in his birthplace, Horsens.

== Achievements ==
=== European Championships ===
Men's doubles
Year	Venue	Partner	Opponent	Score	Result
1994	Maaspoort Sports and Events; Den Bosch, Netherlands	(Denmark) Jens Eriksen	(England) Simon Archer (England) Chris Hunt	12–15, 7–15, 12–15	Bronze

Mixed doubles
Year	Venue	Partner	Opponent	Score	Result
1994	Maaspoort Sports and Events; Den Bosch, Netherlands	(Denmark) Lotte Olsen	(Denmark) Michael Søgaard (Sweden) Catrine Bengtsson	6–15, 9–15	Silver

=== European Junior Championships ===
Men's doubles
Year	Venue	Partner	Opponent	Score	Result
1989	Armitage Centre; Manchester, England	(Denmark) Thomas Stuer-Lauridsen	(England) Anthony Bush (England) Ashley Spencer	15–6, 12–15, 15–9	Gold

Mixed doubles
Year	Venue	Partner	Opponent	Score	Result
1989	Armitage Centre; Manchester, England	(Denmark) Marlene Thomsen	(England) William Mellersh (England) Joanne Goode	18–14, 15–2	Gold

=== IBF World Grand Prix ===
The World Badminton Grand Prix was sanctioned by the International Badminton Federation (IBF) from 1983-2006.

Men's doubles
Year	Tournament	Partner	Opponent	Score	Result
1992	Scottish Open	(Denmark) Jon Holst-Christensen	(Sweden) Peter Axelsson (Sweden) Par-Gunnar Jonsson	10–15, 11–15	(silver) Runner-up
1993	Finnish Open	(Denmark) Henrik Svarrer	(Sweden) Jan-Eric Antonsson (Sweden) Mikael Rosen	15–7, 17–15	(gold) Winner
1994	Chinese Taipei Open	(Denmark) Jens Eriksen	(Indonesia) Rudy Gunawan (Indonesia) Bambang Suprianto	1–15, 8–15	(silver) Runner-up
1994	French Open	(Denmark) Henrik Svarrer	(Indonesia) Aras Razak (Indonesia) Aman Santosa	18–16, 16–17, 12–15	(silver) Runner-up
1994	Scottish Open	(Denmark) Jens Eriksen	(Russia) Andrey Antropov (Russia) Nikolai Zuyev	14–17, 15–13, 6–15	(silver) Runner-up

Mixed doubles
Year	Tournament	Partner	Opponent	Score	Result
1992	Dutch Open	(Denmark) Marianne Rasmussen	(England) Dave Wright (England) Sara Sankey	15–5, 8–15, 12–15	(silver) Runner-up
1993	Japan Open	(Denmark) Marlene Thomsen	(Denmark) Thomas Lund (Sweden) Catrine Bengtsson	6–15, 6–15	(silver) Runner-up
1993	Canada Open	(Denmark) Lotte Olsen	(Denmark) Thomas Lund (Sweden) Catrine Bengtsson	2–15, 9–15	(silver) Runner-up
1993	Finnish Open	(Denmark) Marlene Thomsen	(Sweden) Jan-Eric Antonsson (Sweden) Astrid Crabo	10–15, 11–15	(silver) Runner-up

=== IBF International ===
Men's doubles
Year	Tournament	Partner	Opponent	Score	Result
1990	Polish Open	(Denmark) Thomas Stuer-Lauridsen	(Malaysia) Yap Yee Guan (Malaysia) Yap Yee Hup	15–10, 12–15, 15–5	(gold) Winner
1990	Czechoslovakian International	(Denmark) Thomas Stuer-Lauridsen	(Soviet Union) Igor Dmitriev (Soviet Union) Mikhail Korshuk	15–8, 15–9	(gold) Winner
1991	Norwegian International	(Denmark) Martin Lundgaard Hansen	(Sweden) Jan-Eric Antonsson (Sweden) Stellan Osterberg	6–15, 5–15	(silver) Runner-up
1992	Polish Open	(Denmark) Max Gandrup	(Indonesia) Rudy Gunawan Haditono (Indonesia) Dicky Purwotjugiono	15–8, 14–18, 15–4	(gold) Winner
1992	Uppsala International	(Denmark) Max Gandrup	(Sweden) Robert Larsson (Sweden) Rikard Magnusson	15–12, 15–13	(gold) Winner

Mixed doubles
Year	Tournament	Partner	Opponent	Score	Result
1990	Polish Open	(Denmark) Marlene Thomsen	(Poland) Jerzy Dolhan (Poland) Bozena Haracz	15–5, 10–15, 18–16	(gold) Winner
1990	Austrian International	(Denmark) Marlene Thomsen	(Soviet Union) Nikolai Zuyev (Bulgaria) Diana Koleva	15–5, 11–15, 15–6	(gold) Winner
1990	Czechoslovakian International	(Denmark) Marlene Thomsen	(Denmark) Peter Christensen (Denmark) Trine Johansson	17–14, 15–4	(gold) Winner
1991	Norwegian International	(Denmark) Marianne Rasmussen	(Sweden) Jan-Eric Antonsson (Sweden) Astrid Crabo	15–18, 7–15	(silver) Runner-up
1992	Polish Open	(Denmark) Marianne Rasmussen	(Denmark) Max Gandrup (Denmark) Rikke Broen	15–5, 15–1	(gold) Winner
1992	Uppsala International	(Denmark) Marianne Rasmussen	(Denmark) Max Gandrup (Sweden) Astrid Crabo	15–6, 15–9	(gold) Winner
1993	Hamburg Cup	(Denmark) Marlene Thomsen	(Denmark) Jens Eriksen (Denmark) Anne-Mette van Dijk	10–15, 15–13, 15–11	(gold) Winner
1994	Hamburg Cup	(Denmark) Lotte Olsen	(Denmark) Thomas Lund (Denmark) Marlene Thomsen	8–15, 6–15	(silver) Runner-up
