= Anne-Mette van Dijk =

Danish badminton player

Personal information
- Born: 22 April 1968 (age 58)
- Height: 1.68 m (5 ft 6 in)

Sport
- Country: Denmark
- Sport: Badminton
- Handedness: Right
- Event: Doubles

Doubles
- BWF profile
Medal record
Women's badminton
Representing Denmark
Sudirman Cup
Bronze medal – third place	1993 Birmingham	Mixed team
European Mixed Team Championships
Silver medal – second place	1994 Den Bosch	Mixed team

Anne-Mette van Dijk (née Anne Mette Bille; born 22 April 1968) is a Danish former top badminton player of mid '90s. Anne Mette Bille won her first title in 1980 at the Danish U13 Junior Individual Championships. In 1986, she won Nordic Junior Championships partnering Thomas Lund. In 1989 she won the senior national doubles title for the first time with Lotte Olsen. In 1993 she reached the quarter-finals at the World Championships. 1994, she won silver at the European Championship in the mixed team event. Her husband Jeroen van Dijk was a former Olympian in Badminton. They met each other in 1994 in Taiwan & got married in 1999. She runs a shop for greeting cards for various occasions in Lyngby.

== Achievements ==
=== IBF World Grand Prix ===
The World Badminton Grand Prix sanctioned by International Badminton Federation (IBF) since 1983.

Women's doubles
Year	Tournament	Partner	Opponent	Score	Result
1992	Dutch Open	(Denmark) Marianne Rasmussen	(England) Julie Bradbury (England) Joanne Goode	15–9, 9–15, 15–2	(gold) Winner
1993	Swiss Open	(Denmark) Marlene Thomsen	(Denmark) Lotte Olsen (Denmark) Lisbet Stuer-Lauridsen	6–15, 15–3, 4–15	(silver) Runner-up
1993	Scottish Open	(Denmark) Marlene Thomsen	(Denmark) Lotte Olsen (Denmark) Lisbet Stuer-Lauridsen	15–11, 10–15, 7–15	(silver) Runner-up
1994	German Open	(Denmark) Marlene Thomsen	(China) Zhang Jin (China) Peng Xinyong	11–15, 5–15	(silver) Runner-up
1994	Denmark Open	(Denmark) Marlene Thomsen	(Sweden) Christine Magnusson (Sweden) Lim Xiaoqing	12–15, 15–7, 2–15	(silver) Runner-up
1995	Swiss Open	(Denmark) Marlene Thomsen	(Denmark) Helene Kirkegaard (Denmark) Rikke Olsen	15–10, 5–15, 14–17	(silver) Runner-up

Mixed doubles
Year	Tournament	Partner	Opponent	Score	Result
1992	Denmark Open	(Denmark) Jon Holst-Christensen	(Denmark) Thomas Lund (Denmark) Pernille Dupont	10–15, 9–15	(silver) Runner-up
1992	Scottish Open	(Denmark) Jon Holst-Christensen	(Sweden) Jan-Eric Antonsson (Sweden) Astrid Crabo	11–15, 15–11, 10–15	(silver) Runner-up
1993	Korea Open	(Denmark) Jon Holst-Christensen	(Denmark) Thomas Lund (Sweden) Catrine Bengtsson	9–15, 15–12, 4–15	(silver) Runner-up
1995	Scottish Open	(Denmark) Lars Pedersen	(England) Lorraine Cole (England) Julian Robertson	17–14, 15–10	(gold) Winner
1996	German Open	(Denmark) Jens Eriksen	(Indonesia) Tri Kusharjanto (Indonesia) Minarti Timur	1–15, 6–15	(silver) Runner-up

=== IBF International ===
Women's doubles
Year	Tournament	Partner	Opponent	Score	Result
1989	Austrian International	(Denmark) Charlotte Madsen	(Poland) Bożena Bąk (Poland) Bożena Haracz	15–9, 15–10	(gold) Winner
1992	Uppsala International	(Denmark) Marianne Rasmussen	(Sweden) Margit Borg (Sweden) Charlotta Wihlborg	15–0, 15–7	(gold) Winner
1992	Norwegian International	(Denmark) Trine Pedersen	(Denmark) Rikke Broen (Denmark) Helene Kirkegaard	15–11, 15–6	(gold) Winner
1993	Hamburg Cup	(Denmark) Marlene Thomsen	(England) Joanne Davies (England) Joanne Goode	15–11, 15–7	(gold) Winner
1994	Hamburg Cup	(Denmark) Marlene Thomsen	(Denmark) Helene Kirkegaard (Denmark) Rikke Olsen	15–11, 15–12	(gold) Winner

Mixed doubles
Year	Tournament	Partner	Opponent	Score	Result
1988	Welsh International	(England) Nick Ponting	(England) Mike Brown (England) Jillian Wallwork	12–15, 6–15	(silver) Runner-up
1989	Norwegian International	(Denmark) Lars Pedersen	(Denmark) Thomas Stuer-Lauridsen (Denmark) Lotte Olsen	9–15, 7–15	(silver) Runner-up
1992	Norwegian International	(Denmark) Lars Pedersen	(Denmark) Thomas Damgaard (Denmark) Rikke Broen	18–17, 16–17, 15–5	(gold) Winner
1992	Irish Open	(Denmark) Lars Pedersen	(England) Nick Ponting (England) Joanne Davies	15–7, 15–11	(gold) Winner
1993	Hamburg Cup	(Denmark) Jens Eriksen	(Denmark) Christian Jakobsen (Denmark) Marlene Thomsen	15–10, 13–15, 11–15	(silver) Runner-up
1996	Strasbourg International	(Denmark) Lars Pedersen			(gold) Winner
