= 1996 European Badminton Championships =

Tournament details
- Dates: 13–20 April
- Edition: 15
- Venue: Herning Badminton Klub
- Location: Herning, Denmark

The 15th European Badminton Championships were held in Herning, Denmark, between 13 and 20 April 1996, and hosted by the European Badminton Union and the Danmarks Badminton Forbund.

== Medalists ==
Event	Gold	Silver	Bronze
Men's singles	(Denmark) Poul-Erik Høyer Larsen	(Denmark) Peter Rasmussen	(Sweden) Jesper Olsson
Men's singles	(Denmark) Poul-Erik Høyer Larsen	(Denmark) Peter Rasmussen	(Netherlands) Jeroen van Dijk
Women's singles	(Denmark) Camilla Martin	(Russia) Marina Yakusheva	(Sweden) Christine Magnusson
Women's singles	(Denmark) Camilla Martin	(Russia) Marina Yakusheva	(Denmark) Anne Sondergaard
Men's doubles	(Denmark) Thomas Lund and Jon Holst Christensen	(Denmark) Michael Søgaard and Henrik Svarrer	(England) Simon Archer and Chris Hunt
Men's doubles	(Denmark) Thomas Lund and Jon Holst Christensen	(Denmark) Michael Søgaard and Henrik Svarrer	(Sweden) Peter Axelsson and Pär-Gunnar Jönsson
Women's doubles	(Denmark) Lisbeth Stuer-Lauridsen and Marlene Thomsen	(Denmark) Rikke Olsen and Helene Kirkegaard	(England) Julie Bradbury and Joanne Wright
Women's doubles	(Denmark) Lisbeth Stuer-Lauridsen and Marlene Thomsen	(Denmark) Rikke Olsen and Helene Kirkegaard	(Germany) Katrin Schmidt and Kerstin Ubben
Mixed doubles	(Denmark) Michael Søgaard and Rikke Olsen	(England) Simon Archer and Julie Bradbury	(Germany) Michael Keck and Karen Stechmann
Mixed doubles	(Denmark) Michael Søgaard and Rikke Olsen	(England) Simon Archer and Julie Bradbury	(Netherlands) Ron Michels and Erica van den Heuvel
Teams	Denmark	Sweden	England

== Results ==
=== Semi-finals ===
Category	Winner	Runner-up	Score
Men's singles	(Denmark) Poul-Erik Høyer Larsen	(Sweden) Jesper Olsson	15–7, 15–3
Men's singles	(Denmark) Peter Rasmussen	(Netherlands) Jeroen van Dijk	15–9, 18–13
Women's singles	(Denmark) Camilla Martin	(Sweden) Christine Magnusson	11–6, 11–4
Women's singles	(Russia) Marina Yakusheva	(Denmark) Anne Søndergaard	11–6, 11–9
Men's doubles	(Denmark) Jon-Holst Christensen (Denmark) Thomas Lund	(England) Chris Hunt (England) Simon Archer	15–6, 15–10
Men's doubles	(Denmark) Henrik Svarrer (Denmark) Michael Søgaard	(Sweden) Peter Axelsson (Sweden) Pär-Gunnar Jönsson	15–8, 15–6
Women's doubles	(Denmark) Helene Kirkegaard (Denmark) Rikke Olsen	(Germany) Katrin Schmidt (Germany) Kerstin Ubben	15–6, 15–5
Women's doubles	(Denmark) Lisbet Stuer-Lauridsen (Denmark) Marlene Thomsen	(England) Joanne Goode (England) Julie Bradbury	15–12, 10–15, 15–4
Mixed doubles	(England) Simon Archer (England) Julie Bradbury	(Netherlands) Ron Michels (Netherlands) Erica van den Heuvel	15–11, 15–12
Mixed doubles	(Denmark) Michael Søgaard (Denmark) Rikke Olsen	(Germany) Michael Keck (Germany) Karen Neumann	15–9, 15–10

=== Finals ===
Category	Winners	Runners-up	Score
Men's singles	(Denmark) Poul-Erik Høyer Larsen	(Denmark) Peter Rasmussen	15–5, 15–11
Women's singles	(Denmark) Camilla Martin	(Russia) Marina Yakusheva	11–0, 11–3
Men's doubles	(Denmark) Jon-Holst Christensen (Denmark) Thomas Lund	(Denmark) Henrik Svarrer (Denmark) Michael Søgaard	10–15, 15–12, 18–17
Women's doubles	(Denmark) Lisbet Stuer-Lauridsen (Denmark) Marlene Thomsen	(Denmark) Helene Kirkegaard (Denmark) Rikke Olsen	6–15, 15–12, 15–10
Mixed doubles	(Denmark) Michael Søgaard (Denmark) Rikke Olsen	(England) Simon Archer (England) Julie Bradbury	18–16, 15–2

== Medal account ==
Pos	Country	Gold	Silver	Bronze	Total
1	Denmark	6	3	1	10
2	England	0	1	3	4
2	Sweden	0	1	3	4
4	Russia	0	1	0	1
5	Germany	0	0	2	2
5	Netherlands	0	0	2	2
