= 1998 European Badminton Championships =

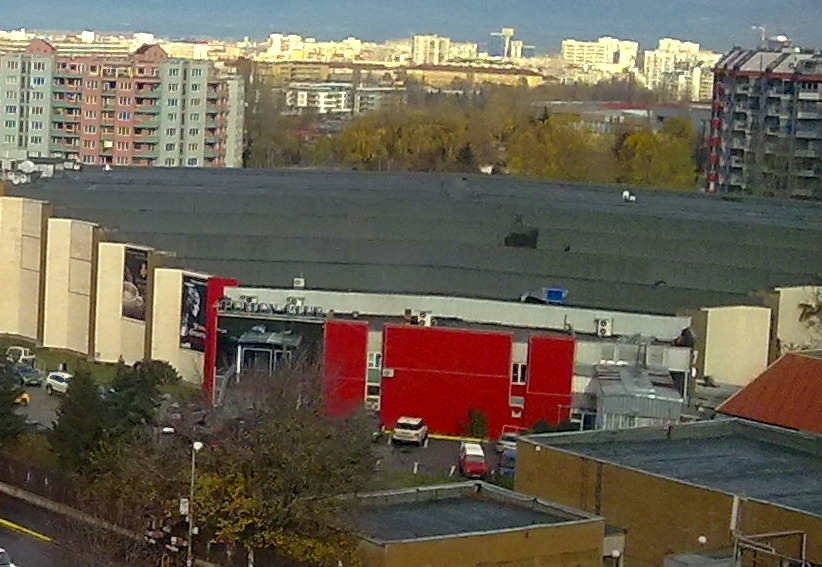

Tournament details
- Dates: 18–25 April
- Edition: 16
- Venue: Winter Sports Palace
- Location: Sofia, Bulgaria

The 16th European Badminton Championships were held in Sofia, Bulgaria, between 18 and 25 April 1998, and hosted by the European Badminton Union and the Bulgarian Badminton Federation.

== Venue ==
The competition was held at the Winter Sports Palace in Sofia.

== Medalists ==
Event	Gold	Silver	Bronze
Men's singles	(Denmark) Peter Gade	(Denmark) Kenneth Jonassen	(Denmark) Peter Rasmussen
Men's singles	(Denmark) Peter Gade	(Denmark) Kenneth Jonassen	(Denmark) Poul-Erik Høyer Larsen
Women's singles	(Denmark) Camilla Martin	(Wales) Kelly Morgan	(Denmark) Mette Sørensen
Women's singles	(Denmark) Camilla Martin	(Wales) Kelly Morgan	(Denmark) Mette Pedersen
Men's doubles	(England) Simon Archer and Chris Hunt	(Sweden) Peter Axelsson and Pär-Gunnar Jönsson	(Denmark) Jon Holst Christensen and Michael Søgaard
Men's doubles	(England) Simon Archer and Chris Hunt	(Sweden) Peter Axelsson and Pär-Gunnar Jönsson	(England) Julian Robertson and Nathan Robertson
Women's doubles	(Denmark) Rikke Olsen and Marlene Thomsen	(Denmark) Ann Jørgensen and Majken Vange	(England) Joanne Goode and Donna Kellogg
Women's doubles	(Denmark) Rikke Olsen and Marlene Thomsen	(Denmark) Ann Jørgensen and Majken Vange	(Netherlands) Monique Hoogland and Erica van den Heuvel
Mixed doubles	(Denmark) Michael Søgaard and Rikke Olsen	(Germany) Michael Keck and (Netherlands) Erica van den Heuvel	(England) Simon Archer and Joanne Goode
Mixed doubles	(Denmark) Michael Søgaard and Rikke Olsen	(Germany) Michael Keck and (Netherlands) Erica van den Heuvel	(Denmark) Jon Holst Christensen and Ann Jørgensen
Teams	Denmark	England	Sweden

== Results ==
=== Semi-finals ===
Category	Winner	Runner-up	Score
Men's singles	(Denmark) Peter Gade	(Denmark) Peter Rasmussen	Walkover
Men's singles	(Denmark) Kenneth Jonassen	(Denmark) Poul-Erik Høyer Larsen	15–6, 15–6
Women's singles	(Denmark) Camilla Martin	(Denmark) Mette Sørensen	11–7, 12–11
Women's singles	(Wales) Kelly Morgan	(Denmark) Mette Pedersen	12–9, 11–8
Men's doubles	(England) Simon Archer (England) Chris Hunt	(Denmark) Jon-Holst Christensen (Denmark) Michael Søgaard	15–8, 15–8
Men's doubles	(Sweden) Peter Axelsson (Sweden) Pär-Gunnar Jönsson	(England) Julian Robertson (England) Nathan Robertson	10–15, 15–10, 15–10
Women's doubles	(Denmark) Rikke Olsen (Denmark) Marlene Thomsen	(England) Joanne Goode (England) Donna Kellogg	15–5, 15–10
Women's doubles	(Denmark) Ann Jørgensen (Denmark) Majken Vange	(Netherlands) Monique Hoogland (Netherlands) Erica van den Heuvel	12–15, 18–16, 15–7 (Note: Score given in tournament software is wrong.)
Mixed doubles	(Denmark) Michael Søgaard (Denmark) Rikke Olsen	(Denmark) Jon-Holst Christensen (Denmark) Ann Jørgensen	15–6, 15–12
Mixed doubles	(Germany) Michael Keck (Netherlands) Erica van den Heuvel	(England) Simon Archer (England) Joanne Goode	8–15, 15–11, 15–8

=== Finals ===
Category	Winners	Runners-up	Score
Men's singles	(Denmark) Peter Gade	(Denmark) Kenneth Jonassen	15–8, 15–4
Women's singles	(Denmark) Camilla Martin	(Wales) Kelly Morgan	11–2, 11–4
Men's doubles	(England) Simon Archer (England) Chris Hunt	(Sweden) Peter Axelsson (Sweden) Pär-Gunnar Jönsson	15–3, 15–3
Women's doubles	(Denmark) Rikke Olsen (Denmark) Marlene Thomsen	(Denmark) Ann Jørgensen (Denmark) Majken Vange	15–2, 15–10
Mixed doubles	(Denmark) Michael Søgaard (Denmark) Rikke Olsen	(Germany) Michael Keck (Netherlands) Erica van den Heuvel	15–7, 6–15, 15–11

== Medal account ==
Pos	Country	Gold	Silver	Bronze	Total
1	Denmark	5	2	6	13
2	England	1	1	3	5
3	Netherlands	0	1	1	2
3	Sweden	0	1	1	2
5	Germany	0	1	0	1
5	Wales	0	1	0	1
