= Mette Pedersen =

Danish badminton player

Personal information
- Born: 30 September 1973 (age 53)
- Height: 173 cm (5 ft 8 in)

Sport
- Country: Denmark
- Sport: Badminton
- Handedness: Right
- Coached by: Kenneth Larsen

Women's singles
- Highest ranking: 21
- BWF profile
Medal record
Women's badminton
Representing Denmark
Sudirman Cup
Bronze medal – third place	1997 Glasgow	Mixed team
Uber Cup
Silver medal – second place	2000 Kuala Lumpur	Women's team
Bronze medal – third place	1998 Hong Kong	Women's team
Bronze medal – third place	1996 Hong Kong	Women's team
European Championships
Bronze medal – third place	1998 Sofia	Women's singles
European Mixed Team Championships
Gold medal – first place	1998 Sofia	Mixed team
European Junior Championships
Gold medal – first place	1991 Budapest	Girls' doubles
Bronze medal – third place	1991 Budapest	Girls' singles
Bronze medal – third place	1991 Budapest	Mixed team

Mette Viscovich (née Pedersen; born 30 September 1973) is a Danish retired badminton player from Skovshoved, Useedet club. Trained at Nørre Broby, she has represented her country in big competitions such as World championships, Sudirman cup, Uber cup and European championships as well. She is known for her modest attacking play with fine technical skills; masked with good strokes and good net play.

== Achievements ==
=== European Championships ===
Women's singles
Year	Venue	Opponent	Score	Result
1998	Winter Sports Palace; Sofia, Bulgaria	(Wales) Kelly Morgan	9–12, 8–11	Bronze

=== European Junior Championships ===
Girls' singles
Year	Venue	Opponent	Score	Result
1991	BMTE-Törley impozáns sportcsarnokában Budapest, Hungary	(Denmark) Anne Søndergaard	5–11, 11–12	Bronze

Girls' doubles
Year	Venue	Partner	Opponent	Score	Result
1991	BMTE-Törley impozáns sportcsarnokában Budapest, Hungary	(Denmark) Trine Pedersen	(England) Alison Humby (England) Joanne Wright	15–8, 15–6	Gold

=== IBF World Grand Prix ===
The World Badminton Grand Prix has been sanctioned by the International Badminton Federation from 1983 to 2006.

Women's singles
Year	Tournament	Opponent	Score	Result
1995	Hamburg Cup	(Denmark) Pernille Nedergaard	5–11, 5–11	(silver) Runner-up
1997	Russian Open	(Denmark) Mette Sørensen	11–3, 11–2	(gold) Winner
1997	Denmark Open	(Denmark) Camilla Martin	2–11, 8–11	(silver) Runner-up

Women's doubles
Year	Tournament	Partner	Opponent	Score	Result
1995	Polish Open	(Denmark) Majken Vange	(Indonesia) Emma Ermawati (Indonesia) Indarti Issolina	13–15, 8–15	(silver) Runner-up

=== IBF International ===
Women's singles
Year	Tournament	Opponent	Score	Result
1993	Hamburg Cup	(Denmark) Pernille Nedergaard	8–11, 1–11	(silver) Runner-up
1996	Austrian International	(Netherlands) Monique Hoogland	11–4, 11–7	(gold) Winner
1996	Irish International	(Denmark) Pernille Harder	6–11, 5–11	(silver) Runner-up

Women's doubles
Year	Tournament	Partner	Opponent	Score	Result
1995	Amor International	(Denmark) Tanja Berg	(Australia) Rhonda Cator (Australia) Amanda Hardy	15–2, 15–5	(gold) Winner
1996	Irish International	(Denmark) Tanja Berg	(Denmark) Michelle Rasmussen (Denmark) Majken Vange	15–3, 12–15, 15–12	(gold) Winner
