= 2000 European Badminton Championships =

Tournament details
- Dates: 25–29 April
- Edition: 17
- Venue: Kelvin Hall International Sports Arena
- Location: Glasgow, Scotland

The 17th European Badminton Championships were held in Glasgow, Scotland, between 25 and 29 April 2000, and hosted by the European Badminton Union and the Scottish Badminton Union.

== Venue ==
This tournament was held at the Kelvin Hall International Sports Arena, in Glasgow.

== Medalists ==
Event	Gold	Silver	Bronze
Men's singles	(Denmark) Peter Gade	(Denmark) Poul-Erik Høyer Larsen	(Wales) Richard Vaughan
Men's singles	(Denmark) Peter Gade	(Denmark) Poul-Erik Høyer Larsen	(Denmark) Kenneth Jonassen
Women's singles	(Denmark) Camilla Martin	(Sweden) Marina Andrievskaya	(Wales) Kelly Morgan
Women's singles	(Denmark) Camilla Martin	(Sweden) Marina Andrievskaya	(Denmark) Mette Sørensen
Men's doubles	(Denmark) Jens Eriksen and Jesper Larsen	(Sweden) Peter Axelsson and Pär-Gunnar Jönsson	(England) Simon Archer and Nathan Robertson
Men's doubles	(Denmark) Jens Eriksen and Jesper Larsen	(Sweden) Peter Axelsson and Pär-Gunnar Jönsson	(Poland) Michał Łogosz and Robert Mateusiak
Women's doubles	(England) Joanne Goode and Donna Kellogg	(Denmark) Helene Kirkegaard and Rikke Olsen	(Russia) Irina Ruslyakova and Marina Yakusheva
Women's doubles	(England) Joanne Goode and Donna Kellogg	(Denmark) Helene Kirkegaard and Rikke Olsen	(Netherlands) Lotte Jonathans and Nicole van Hooren
Mixed doubles	(Denmark) Michael Søgaard and Rikke Olsen	(Denmark) Jens Eriksen and Mette Schjoldager	(Denmark) Jon Holst Christensen and Ann Jørgensen
Mixed doubles	(Denmark) Michael Søgaard and Rikke Olsen	(Denmark) Jens Eriksen and Mette Schjoldager	(Netherlands) Chris Bruil and Erica van den Heuvel
Teams	Denmark	England	Netherlands

== Results ==
=== Semi-finals ===
Category	Winner	Runner-up	Score
Men's singles	(Denmark) Peter Gade	(Wales) Richard Vaughan	15–3, 15–4
Men's singles	(Denmark) Poul-Erik Høyer Larsen	(Denmark) Kenneth Jonassen	15–8, 5–15, 15–8
Women's singles	(Denmark) Camilla Martin	(Wales) Kelly Morgan	4–11, 11–6, 11–1
Women's singles	(Sweden) Marina Andrievskaya	(Denmark) Mette Sørensen	11–7, 11–4
Men's doubles	(Sweden) Peter Axelsson (Sweden) Pär-Gunnar Jönsson	(Poland) Michał Łogosz (Poland) Robert Mateusiak	15–6, 10–15, 15–11
Men's doubles	(Denmark) Jens Eriksen (Denmark) Jesper Larsen	(England) Simon Archer (England) Nathan Robertson	15–13, 7–15, 15–3
Women's doubles	(Denmark) Helene Kirkegaard (Denmark) Rikke Olsen	(Netherlands) Lotte Jonathans (Netherlands) Nicole van Hooren	15–6, 15–1
Women's doubles	(England) Joanne Goode (England) Donna Kellogg	(Russia) Irina Ruslyakova (Russia) Marina Yakusheva	15–13, 15–13
Mixed doubles	(Denmark) Michael Søgaard (Denmark) Rikke Olsen	(Denmark) Jon-Holst Christensen (Denmark) Ann Jørgensen	15–5, 13–15, 15–3
Mixed doubles	(Denmark) Jens Eriksen (Denmark) Mette Schjoldager	(Netherlands) Chris Bruil (Netherlands) Erica van den Heuvel	15–8, 15–9

=== Finals ===
Category	Winners	Runners-up	Score
Men's singles	(Denmark) Peter Gade	(Denmark) Poul-Erik Høyer Larsen	15–5, 15–11
Women's singles	(Denmark) Camilla Martin	(Sweden) Marina Andrievskaya	13–10, 11–3
Men's doubles	(Denmark) Jens Eriksen (Denmark) Jesper Larsen	(Sweden) Peter Axelsson (Sweden) Pär-Gunnar Jönsson	15–7, 15–6
Women's doubles	(England) Joanne Goode (England) Donna Kellogg	(Denmark) Helene Kirkegaard (Denmark) Rikke Olsen	7–15, 15–10, 15–8
Mixed doubles	(Denmark) Michael Søgaard (Denmark) Rikke Olsen	(Denmark) Jens Eriksen (Denmark) Mette Schjoldager	15–7, 15–12

== Medal account ==
Pos	Country	Gold	Silver	Bronze	Total
1	Denmark	5	3	3	11
2	England	1	1	1	3
3	Sweden	0	2	0	2
4	Netherlands	0	0	3	3
5	Wales	0	0	2	2
6	Poland	0	0	1	1
6	Russia	0	0	1	1
