= 1991 European Junior Badminton Championships =

Badminton championships

Tournament details
- Dates: 31 March – 6 April 1991
- Edition: 12th
- Venue: BMTE-Törley impozáns sportcsarnokában
- Location: Budapest, Hungary

The 1991 European Junior Badminton Championships was the 12th tournament of the European Junior Badminton Championships. It was held in Budapest, Hungary, from 31 March to 6 April. Danish players won four titles girls' singles, and all the three doubles disciplines while Austria won Boys' singles and Soviet Union won the mixed team championships.

== Medalists ==
Discipline	Gold	Silver	Bronze
Boys' singles	(Austria) Jürgen Koch	(Netherlands) Joris van Soerland	(Soviet Union) Vladislav Druzchenko
Boys' singles	(Austria) Jürgen Koch	(Netherlands) Joris van Soerland	(England) Simon Archer
Girls' singles	(Denmark) Lotte Thomsen	(Denmark) Anne Søndergaard	(Denmark) Mette Pedersen
Girls' singles	(Denmark) Lotte Thomsen	(Denmark) Anne Søndergaard	(England) Alison Humby
Boys' doubles	(Denmark) Peter Christensen (Denmark) Martin Lundgaard Hansen	(Soviet Union) Vladislav Druzchenko (Soviet Union) Valeriy Strelcov	(England) James Anderson (England) Ian Pearson
Boys' doubles	(Denmark) Peter Christensen (Denmark) Martin Lundgaard Hansen	(Soviet Union) Vladislav Druzchenko (Soviet Union) Valeriy Strelcov	(Denmark) Thomas Damgaard (Denmark) Jim Laugesen
Girls' doubles	(Denmark) Mette Pedersen (Denmark) Trine Pedersen	(England) Alison Humby (England) Joanne Wright	(Netherlands) Brenda Conijn (Netherlands) Nicole van Hooren
Girls' doubles	(Denmark) Mette Pedersen (Denmark) Trine Pedersen	(England) Alison Humby (England) Joanne Wright	(Sweden) Lotta Andersson (Sweden) Karolina Ericsson
Mixed doubles	(Denmark) Peter Christensen (Denmark) Rikke Broen	(Netherlands) Joris van Soerland (Netherlands) Nicole van Hooren	(Soviet Union) Valeriy Strelcov (Soviet Union) Svetlana Alferova
Mixed doubles	(Denmark) Peter Christensen (Denmark) Rikke Broen	(Netherlands) Joris van Soerland (Netherlands) Nicole van Hooren	(England) Simon Archer (England) Joanne Davies
Mixed team	Soviet Union; Vladislav Druzchenko; Valeriy Strelcov; Konstantin Tatranov; Michail Mizin; Saule Kustavletova; Marina Yakusheva; Irina Yakusheva; Svetlana Alferova	Netherlands; Joris van Soerland; Jeroen Steffers; Bram Bakker; Ruud Kuijten; Nicole van Hooren; Brenda Conjin; Carolien Glebbeek; Esmee Albinus	Denmark; Thomas Damgaard; Jim Laugesen; Martin Lundgaard Hansen; Peter Christensen; Anne Søndergaard; Trine Pedersen; Mette Pedersen; Lotte Thomsen

== Results ==
=== Semi-finals ===
Category	Winner	Runner-up	Score
Boys' singles	(Netherlands) Joris van Soerland	(Soviet Union) Vladislav Druzhchenko	18–17, 15–13
Boys' singles	(Austria) Jürgen Koch	(England) Simon Archer	11–15, 15–12, 15–8
Girls' singles	(Denmark) Anne Søndergaard	(Denmark) Mette Pedersen	11–5, 12–11
Girls' singles	(Denmark) Lotte Thomsen	(England) Alison Humby	11–2, 11–2
Boys' doubles	(Denmark) Martin Lundgaard Hansen (Denmark) Peter Christensen	(England) Ian Pearson (England) James Anderson	15–7, 15–1
Boys' doubles	(Soviet Union) Valerij Streltsov (Soviet Union) Vladislav Druzhchenko	(Denmark) Jim Laugesen (Denmark) Thomas Damgaard	18–16, 15–7
Girls' doubles	(England) Alison Humby (England) Joanne Wright	(Netherlands) Brenda Conjin (Netherlands) Nicole van Hooren	15–10, 15–5
Girls' doubles	(Denmark) Mette Pedersen (Denmark) Trine Pedersen	(Sweden) Karolina Ericsson (Sweden) Lotta Andersson	15–9, 15–7
Mixed doubles	(Netherlands) Joris van Soerland (Netherlands) Nicole van Hooren	(England) Simon Archer (England) Joanne Davies	15–11, 15–4
Mixed doubles	(Denmark) Peter Christensen (Denmark) Rikke Broen	(Soviet Union) Valerij Streltsov (Soviet Union) Svetlana Alferova	15–4, 15–8

=== Finals ===
Category	Winners	Runners-up	Score
Boys' singles	(Austria) Jürgen Koch	(Netherlands) Joris van Soerland	15–1, 15–4
Girls' singles	(Denmark) Lotte Thomsen	(Denmark) Anne Søndergaard	7–11, 11–7, 11–0
Boys' doubles	(Denmark) Martin Lundgaard Hansen (Denmark) Peter Christensen	(Soviet Union) Valerij Streltsov (Soviet Union) Vladislav Druzhchenko	15–7, 15–10
Girls' doubles	(Denmark) Mette Pedersen (Denmark) Trine Pedersen	(England) Alison Humby (England) Joanne Wright	15–8, 15–6
Mixed doubles	(Denmark) Peter Christensen (Denmark) Rikke Broen	(Netherlands) Joris van Soerland (Netherlands) Nicole van Hooren	6–15, 15–10, 15–5

== Medal table ==
Rank	Nation	Gold	Silver	Bronze	Total
1	Denmark (DEN)	4	1	3	8
2	Soviet Union (SOV)	1	1	2	4
3	Austria (AUT)	1	0	0	1
4	Netherlands (NED)	0	3	1	4
5	England (ENG)	0	1	4	5
6	Sweden (SWE)	0	0	1	1
Totals (6 entries)		6	6	11	23
