= 1989 European Junior Badminton Championships =

Badminton championships

Tournament details
- Dates: 26 March – 1 April
- Edition: 11th
- Venue: Armitage Centre
- Location: Manchester, England

The 1989 European Junior Badminton Championships was the 11th tournament of the European Junior Badminton Championships. It was held in Manchester, England, from 26 March to 1 April. Danish players won all the individual titles and mixed team championships as well.

== Medalists ==
Discipline	Gold	Silver	Bronze
Boys' singles	(Denmark) Thomas Stuer-Lauridsen	(Denmark) Morten Hummelmose	(Netherlands) Chris Bruil
Boys' singles	(Denmark) Thomas Stuer-Lauridsen	(Denmark) Morten Hummelmose	(England) Steffan Pandya
Girls' singles	(Denmark) Camilla Martin	(Denmark) Helene Kirkegaard	(Netherlands) Elvira van Elven
Girls' singles	(Denmark) Camilla Martin	(Denmark) Helene Kirkegaard	(Denmark) Trine Johansson
Boys' doubles	(Denmark) Thomas Stuer-Lauridsen (Denmark) Christian Jakobsen	(England) Anthony Bush (England) Ashley Spencer	(England) John Quinn (England) Neil Cottrill
Boys' doubles	(Denmark) Thomas Stuer-Lauridsen (Denmark) Christian Jakobsen	(England) Anthony Bush (England) Ashley Spencer	(Netherlands) Jeroen van Dijk (Netherlands) Chris Bruil
Girls' doubles	(Denmark) Marlene Thomsen (Denmark) Trine Johansson	(Denmark) Helene Kirkegaard (Denmark) Camilla Martin	(Sweden) Astrid Crabo (Sweden) Veronica Sandberg
Girls' doubles	(Denmark) Marlene Thomsen (Denmark) Trine Johansson	(Denmark) Helene Kirkegaard (Denmark) Camilla Martin	(Germany) Kerstin Weinbörner (Germany) Karen Stechmann
Mixed doubles	(Denmark) Christian Jakobsen (Denmark) Marlene Thomsen	(England) William Mellersh (England) Joanne Wright	(Soviet Union) Sergey Melnikov (Soviet Union) Aušrinė Gabrėnaitė
Mixed doubles	(Denmark) Christian Jakobsen (Denmark) Marlene Thomsen	(England) William Mellersh (England) Joanne Wright	(Germany) Michael Helber (West Germany) Kerstin Weinbörner
Mannschaft	Denmark; Thomas Stuer-Lauridsen; Morten Hummelmose; Christian Jakobsen; Thomas Moestrup; Morten Bundgaard; Camilla Martin; Helene Kirkegaard; Trine Johansson; Marlene Thomsen	England; Steffan Pandya; Anthony Bush; Ashley Spencer; John Quinn; Neil Cottrill; William Mellersh; Julia Mann; Tanya Groves; Joanne Wright; Kim Egerton	Sweden; Rikard Magnusson; Rikard Gruvberg; Anders Hansson; Astrid Crabo; Veronica Sandberg; Jeanette Ryrman; Jessica Reinholdsson

== Results ==
=== Semi-finals ===
Category	Winner	Runner-up	Score
Boys' singles	(Denmark) Thomas Stuer-Lauridsen	(Netherlands) Chris Bruil	15–3, 15–11
Boys' singles	(Denmark) Morten Hummelmose	(England) Stefan Pandya	15–9, 15–3
Girls' singles	(Denmark) Camilla Martin	(Netherlands) Elvira van Elven	11–0, 11–3
Girls' singles	(Denmark) Helene Kirkegård	(Denmark) Trine Johansson	11–2, 11–2
Boys' doubles	(Denmark) Christian Jakobsen (Denmark) Thomas Stuer-Lauridsen	(England) John Quinn (England) Neil Cottrill	15–5, 18–14
Boys' doubles	(England) Anthony Bush (England) Ashley Spencer	(Netherlands) Chris Bruil (Netherlands) Jeroen van Dijk	15–12, 4–15, 15–9
Girls' doubles	(Denmark) Marlene Thomsen (Denmark) Trine Johansson	(Sweden) Astrid Crabo (Sweden) Veronica Sandberg	15–6, 15–9
Girls' doubles	(Denmark) Camilla Martin (Denmark) Helene Kirkegård	(Germany) Karen Stechmann (Germany) Kerstin Weinbörner	15–8, 15–5
Mixed doubles	(England) William Mellersh (England) Joanne Wright	(Soviet Union) Sergey Melnikov (Soviet Union) Aušrinė Gabrėnaitė	15–9, 15–13
Mixed doubles	(Denmark) Christian Jakobsen (Denmark) Marlene Thomsen	(Germany) Michael Helber (Germany) Kerstin Weinbörner	15–5, 15–7

=== Finals ===
Category	Winners	Runners-up	Score
Boys' singles	(Denmark) Thomas Stuer-Lauridsen	(Denmark) Morten Hummelmose	15–5, 15–1
Girls' singles	(Denmark) Camilla Martin	(Denmark) Helene Kirkegård	11–4, 11–4
Boys' doubles	(Denmark) Christian Jakobsen (Denmark) Thomas Stuer-Lauridsen	(England) Anthony Bush (England) Ashley Spencer	15–6, 12–15, 15–9
Girls' doubles	(Denmark) Marlene Thomsen (Denmark) Trine Johansson	(Denmark) Camilla Martin (Denmark) Helene Kirkegård	15–5, 13–15, 15–5
Mixed doubles	(Denmark) Christian Jakobsen (Denmark) Marlene Thomsen	(England) William Mellersh (England) Joanne Wright	18–14, 15–2

== Medal table ==
Rank	Nation	Gold	Silver	Bronze	Total
1	Denmark (DEN)	6	3	1	10
2	England (ENG)	0	3	2	5
3	Netherlands (NED)	0	0	3	3
4	Germany (GER)	0	0	2	2
4	Sweden (SWE)	0	0	2	2
6	Soviet Union (SOV)	0	0	1	1
Totals (6 entries)		6	6	11	23
