= Joanne Goode =

British badminton player (born 1972)

Joanne Goode MBE
Personal information
- Born: Joanne Gwendoline Wright; 17 November 1972 (age 53) Harlow, Essex, England
- Height: 1.68 m (5 ft 6 in)
- Weight: 68 kg (150 lb)

Sport
- Country: England
- Sport: Badminton
- Handedness: Right

Women's & mixed doubles
- Highest ranking: 4 (WD), 1 (XD)
- BWF profile
Medal record
Women's badminton
Representing Great Britain
Olympic Games
Bronze medal – third place	2000 Sydney	Mixed doubles
Representing England
World Championships
Silver medal – second place	1999 Copenhagen	Mixed doubles
World Cup
Bronze medal – third place	1995 Jakarta	Women's doubles
Commonwealth Games
Gold medal – first place	1994 Victoria	Women's doubles
Gold medal – first place	1994 Victoria	Mixed team
Gold medal – first place	1998 Kuala Lumpur	Women's doubles
Gold medal – first place	1998 Kuala Lumpur	Mixed doubles
Gold medal – first place	1998 Kuala Lumpur	Women's team
Gold medal – first place	2002 Manchester	Mixed doubles
Gold medal – first place	2002 Manchester	Mixed team
Bronze medal – third place	1994 Victoria	Mixed doubles
Bronze medal – third place	2002 Manchester	Women's doubles
European Championships
Gold medal – first place	2000 Glasgow	Women's doubles
Bronze medal – third place	1996 Herning	Women's doubles
Bronze medal – third place	1998 Sofia	Women's doubles
Bronze medal – third place	1998 Sofia	Mixed doubles
European Mixed Team Championships
Silver medal – second place	2000 Glasgow	Mixed team
Silver medal – second place	2002 Malmö	Mixed team
Bronze medal – third place	1996 Herning	Mixed team
Bronze medal – third place	1994 Den Bosch	Mixed team
European Junior Championships
Silver medal – second place	1989 Manchester	Mixed doubles
Silver medal – second place	1989 Manchester	Mixed team
Silver medal – second place	1991 Budapest	Girls' doubles

Joanne Gwendoline Goode MBE (née Wright; born 17 November 1972) is an English badminton player. She represented Great Britain at the 1996 and 2000 Olympic Games, and won the 2000 mixed doubles bronze medal with Simon Archer. Goode also won seven gold medals at the Commonwealth Games, a gold at the European Championships, and a silver at the World Championships.

== Career ==
Goode competed in badminton at the 2000 Summer Olympics in mixed doubles with Simon Archer and won a bronze medal. She also played in women's doubles with Donna Kellogg losing in the quarterfinals against Gao Ling and Qi Yiyuan.

Archer and Goode won gold medals twice at the Commonwealth Games in 1998 and 2002.

== Achievements ==
=== Olympic Games ===
Mixed doubles
Year	Venue	Partner	Opponent	Score	Result
2000	The Dome, Sydney, Australia	(United Kingdom) Simon Archer	(Denmark) Michael Søgaard (Denmark) Rikke Olsen	15–4, 12–15, 17–14	Bronze

=== World Championships ===
Mixed doubles
Year	Venue	Partner	Opponent	Score	Result
1999	Brøndby Arena, Copenhagen, Denmark	(England) Simon Archer	(South Korea) Kim Dong-moon (South Korea) Ra Kyung-min	10–15, 13–15	Silver

=== World Cup ===
Women's doubles
Year	Venue	Partner	Opponent	Score	Result
1995	Istora Senayan, Jakarta, Indonesia	(England) Julie Bradbury	(Indonesia) Finarsih (Indonesia) Lili Tampi	15–11, 4–15, 3–15	Bronze

=== Commonwealth Games ===
Women's doubles
Year	Venue	Partner	Opponent	Score	Result
1994	McKinnon Gym, Victoria, British Columbia, Canada	(England) Joanne Muggeridge	(England) Julie Bradbury (England) Gillian Clark	15–9, 15–11	Gold
1998	Kuala Lumpur Badminton Stadium, Kuala Lumpur, Malaysia	(England) Donna Kellogg	(Malaysia) Chor Hooi Yee (Malaysia) Lim Pek Siah	15–8, 15–6	Gold
2002	Bolton Arena, Manchester, England	(England) Gail Emms	(Malaysia) Ang Li Peng (Malaysia) Lim Pek Siah	4–7, 8–6, 6–8, 4–7	Bronze

Mixed doubles
Year	Venue	Partner	Opponent	Score	Result
1994	McKinnon Gym, Victoria, British Columbia, Canada	(England) Nick Ponting	(England) Simon Archer (England) Julie Bradbury	10–15, 12–15	Bronze
1998	Kuala Lumpur Badminton Stadium, Kuala Lumpur, Malaysia	(England) Simon Archer	(England) Nathan Robertson (England) Joanne Davies	15–2, 15–5	Gold
2002	Bolton Arena, Manchester, England	(England) Simon Archer	(Malaysia) Chew Choon Eng (Malaysia) Chin Eei Hui	0–7, 7–5, 7–3, 7–3	Gold

=== European Championships ===
Women's doubles
Year	Venue	Partner	Opponent	Score	Result
1996	Herning Badminton Klub; Herning, Denmark	(England) Julie Bradbury	(Denmark) Lisbeth Stuer-Lauridsen (Denmark) Marlene Thomsen	12–15, 15–10, 4–15	Bronze
1998	Winter Sports Palace; Sofia, Bulgaria	(England) Donna Kellogg	(Denmark) Rikke Olsen (Denmark) Marlene Thomsen	5–15, 10–15	Bronze
2000	Kelvin Hall; Glasgow, Scotland	(England) Donna Kellogg	(Denmark) Helene Kirkegaard (Denmark) Rikke Olsen	7–15, 15–10, 15–8	Gold

Mixed doubles
Year	Venue	Partner	Opponent	Score	Result
1998	Winter Sports Palace; Sofia, Bulgaria	(England) Simon Archer	(Germany) Michael Keck (Netherlands) Erica van den Heuvel	15–8, 11–15, 8–15	Bronze

=== European Junior Championships ===
Girls' doubles
Year	Venue	Partner	Opponent	Score	Result
1991	BMTE-Törley impozáns sportcsarnokában Budapest, Hungary	(England) Alison Humby	(Denmark) Mette Pedersen (Denmark) Trine Pedersen	8–15, 6–15	Silver

Mixed doubles
Year	Venue	Partner	Opponent	Score	Result
1989	Armitage Centre; Manchester, England	(England) William Mellersh	(Denmark) Christian Jakobsen (Denmark) Marlene Thomsen	14–18, 2–15	Silver

=== IBF World Grand Prix ===
The World Badminton Grand Prix sanctioned by International Badminton Federation (IBF) since 1983.

Women's doubles
Year	Tournament	Partner	Opponent	Score	Result
1992	Dutch Open	(England) Julie Bradbury	(Denmark) Anne Mette Bille (Denmark) Marianne Rasmussen	9–15, 15–9, 2–15	(silver) Runner-up
1993	Swiss Open	(England) Gillian Clark	(Russia) Marina Andrievskaya (Russia) Marina Yakusheva	15–8, 15–7	(gold) Winner
1993	Dutch Open	(China) Zhang Ning	(Indonesia) Finarsih (Indonesia) Lili Tampi	9–15, 3–15	(silver) Runner-up
1994	Thailand Open	(England) Julie Bradbury	(China) Ge Fei (China) Gu Jun	12–15, 4–15	(silver) Runner-up
1995	Malaysia Open	(England) Julie Bradbury	(South Korea) Gil Young-ah (South Korea) Jang Hye-ock	15–10, 15–11	(gold) Winner
1995	Hong Kong Open	(England) Julie Bradbury	(South Korea) Gil Young-ah (South Korea) Jang Hye-ock	15–17, 5–15	(silver) Runner-up
1996	U.S. Open	(England) Julie Bradbury	(Indonesia) Eliza Nathanael (Indonesia) Zelin Resiana	7–15, 5–15	(silver) Runner-up
1996	Denmark Open	(England) Julie Bradbury	(Denmark) Helene Kirkegaard (Denmark) Rikke Olsen	6–15, 2–15	(silver) Runner-up
2000	Indonesia Open	(England) Donna Kellogg	(Netherlands) Lotte Jonathans (Netherlands) Nicole van Hooren	7–15, 15–12, 15–10	(gold) Winner

Mixed doubles
Year	Tournament	Partner	Opponent	Score	Result
1994	All England Open	(England) Nick Ponting	(England) Chris Hunt (England) Gillian Clark	15–10, 15–11	(gold) Winner
1994	Thailand Open	(England) Nick Ponting	(Indonesia) Tri Kusharjanto (Indonesia) Minarti Timur	10–15, 12–15	(silver) Runner-up
1996	Polish Open	(England) Nick Ponting	(China) Chen Xingdong (China) Peng Xinyong	15–10, 12–15, 8–15	(silver) Runner-up
1998	Hong Kong Open	(England) Simon Archer	(Denmark) Michael Søgaard (Denmark) Rikke Olsen	15–8, 7–15, 8–15	(silver) Runner-up
1998	Grand Prix Finals	(England) Simon Archer	(South Korea) Kim Dong-moon (South Korea) Ra Kyung-min	6–15, 9–15	(silver) Runner-up
1999	All England Open	(England) Simon Archer	(South Korea) Ha Tae-kwon (South Korea) Chung Jae-hee	15–2, 15–13	(gold) Winner
1999	Swiss Open	(England) Simon Archer	(Denmark) Michael Søgaard (Denmark) Rikke Olsen	15–5, 15–4	(gold) Winner
2000	Thailand Open	(England) Simon Archer	(China) Zhang Jun (China) Gao Ling	13–15, 12–15	(silver) Runner-up
2000	Indonesia Open	(England) Simon Archer	(Denmark) Michael Søgaard (Denmark) Rikke Olsen	15–13, 11–15, 15–4	(gold) Winner

=== IBF International ===
Women's doubles
Year	Tournament	Partner	Opponent	Score	Result
1990	Welsh International	(England) Alison Humby	(England) Julie Bradbury (England) Cheryl Johnson	11–15, 8–15	(silver) Runner-up
1991	Irish International	(England) Alison Humby	(Germany) Katrin Schmidt (Germany) Kerstin Ubben	15–12, 15–11	(gold) Winner
1992	Portugal International	(England) Joanne Davies	(Commonwealth of Independent States) Marina Andrievskaya (Commonwealth of Independent States) Elena Rybkhina	15–4, 15–2	(gold) Winner
1993	La Chaux-de-Fonds International	(England) Tracy Dineen	(Russia) Natalja Ivanova (Russia) Julia Martynenko	15–7, 8–15, 15–12	(gold) Winner
1993	Austrian International	(England) Alison Humby	(Denmark) Anne Søndergaard (Denmark) Lotte Thomsen	13–15, 17–14, 11–15	(silver) Runner-up
1993	Hamburg Cup	(England) Joanne Davies	(Denmark) Anne Mette Bille (Denmark) Marlene Thomsen	11–15, 7–15	(silver) Runner-up
1993	Welsh International	(England) Julie Bradbury	(England) Joanne Davies (England) Joanne Muggeridge	15–9, 15–4	(gold) Winner
1994	Welsh International	(England) Julie Bradbury	(Canada) Si-An Deng (Canada) Denyse Julien	15–3, 17–15	(gold) Winner
1996	Scottish Open	(England) Gillian Gowers	(China) Liu Lu (China) Qian Hong	15–6, 3–15, 5–15	(silver) Runner-up

Mixed doubles
Year	Tournament	Partner	Opponent	Score	Result
1990	Welsh International	(England) Nick Ponting	(Soviet Union) Vitali Shmakov (Soviet Union) Vlada Chernyavskaya	17–14, 7–15, 15–11	(gold) Winner
1991	Welsh International	(England) Andy Goode	(England) Chris Hunt (England) Karen Chapman	18–17, 15–4	(gold) Winner
1991	Irish International	(England) Nick Ponting	(Germany) Michael Keck (Germany) Anne-Katrin Seid	15–10, 15–11	(gold) Winner
1992	Portugal International	(England) Andy Goode	(Commonwealth of Independent States) Nikolai Zuyev (Commonwealth of Independent States) Marina Andrievskaya	15–4, 15–2	(gold) Winner
1992	Welsh International	(England) Nick Ponting	(Germany) Michael Keck (Germany) Karen Neumann	15–7, 18–16	(gold) Winner
1993	Austrian International	(England) Nick Ponting	(Austria) Heinz Fischer (Austria) Irina Serova	15–9, 15–7	(gold) Winner
1993	Wimbledon International	(England) Chris Hunt	(China) Jiang Wen (China) Tao Xiaoqiang	6–15, 15–6, 15–13	(gold) Winner
1993	Welsh International	(England) Chris Hunt	(England) Simon Archer (England) Joanne Davies	15–9, 15–8	(gold) Winner
1994	Welsh International	(England) Nick Ponting	(England) James Anderson (England) Emma Constable	18–15, 15–9	(gold) Winner
1996	Scottish Open	(England) Nick Ponting	(Sweden) Jens Olsson (Sweden) Astrid Crabo	12–15, 15–11, 8–15	(silver) Runner-up

== Personal life ==
Joanne Wright married Andy Goode, an English badminton player who managed the British team in badminton at the 1996 Summer Olympics. They have three children.

Goode was appointed Member of the Order of the British Empire (MBE) in the 2004 Queen's Birthday Honours.
