= Anne Søndergaard =

Danish badminton player (born 1973)

Personal information
- Born: 5 June 1973 (age 53) Hjørring, Denmark
- Height: 1.66 m (5 ft 5 in)

Sport
- Country: Denmark
- Sport: Badminton
- Handedness: Right
- BWF profile
Medal record
Women's badminton
Representing Denmark
Sudirman Cup
Bronze medal – third place	1993 Birmingham	Mixed team
Uber Cup
Bronze medal – third place	1996 Hong Kong	Women's team
European Championships
Bronze medal – third place	1996 Herning	Women's singles
European Mixed Team Championships
Gold medal – first place	1996 Herning	Mixed team
European Junior Championships
Silver medal – second place	1991 Budapest	Girls' singles
Bronze medal – third place	1991 Budapest	Mixed team

Anne Søndergaard (born 5 June 1973) is a Danish badminton player, born in Hjørring.

Søndergaard competed in women's singles at the 1996 Summer Olympics in Atlanta.

== Achievements ==
=== European Championships ===
Women's singles
Year	Venue	Opponent	Score	Result
1996	Herning Badminton Klub; Herning, Denmark	(Russia) Marina Yakusheva	6–11, 9–11	Bronze

=== European Junior Championships ===
Women's singles
Year	Venue	Opponent	Score	Result
1991	BMTE-Törley impozáns sportcsarnokában Budapest, Hungary	(Denmark) Lotte Thomsen	11–7, 7–11, 0–11	Silver

=== IBF World Grand Prix ===
The World Badminton Grand Prix was sanctioned by International Badminton Federation (IBF) in 1983-2006.

Mixed doubles
Year	.Tournament	Partner	Opponent	Score	Result
1995	French Open	(Denmark) Thomas Stavngaard	(Germany) Michael Keck (Germany) Karen Neumann	15–9, 17–14	(gold) Winner

=== IBF International ===
Women's singles
Year	.Tournament	Opponent	Score	Result
1993	Swiss La Chaux de Fonds	(Denmark) Lotte Thomsen	11–3, 11–6	(gold) Winner
1993	Polish Open	(Indonesia) Meiluawati	11–4, 7–11, 11–6	(gold) Winner
1994	Hungarian International	(Ukraine) Elena Nozdran	12–10, 11–3	(gold) Winner
1995	Portugal International	(Sweden) Karolina Ericsson	9–11, 11–1, 11–1	(gold) Winner
1996	Hamburg Cup	(Denmark) Mette Sørensen	6–11, 11–3, 11–5	(gold) Winner

Women's doubles
Year	.Tournament	Partner	Opponent	Score	Result
1992	Polish Open	(Denmark) Rikke Broen	(Commonwealth of Independent States) Marina Andrievskaya (Commonwealth of Independent States) Marina Yakusheva	4–15, 5–15	(silver) Runner-up
1992	Irish Open	(Denmark) Lotte Thomsen	(Commonwealth of Independent States) Marina Andrievskaya (Commonwealth of Independent States) Marina Yakusheva	7–15, 4–15	(silver) Runner-up
1993	Polish Open	(Denmark) Lotte Thomsen	(Denmark) Helene Kirkegaard (Denmark) Rikke Olsen	17–15, 9–15, 15–7	(gold) Winner
1993	Austrian International	(Denmark) Lotte Thomsen	(England) Joanne Goode (England) Alison Humby	15–13, 14–17, 15–11	(gold) Winner
1994	Hungarian International	(Wales) Kelly Morgan	(England) Sarah Hardaker (England) Rebecca Pantaney	8–15, 11–15	(silver) Runner-up
1996	Hamburg Cup	(Denmark) Tanja Berg	(Netherlands) Eline Coene (Netherlands) Erica van den Heuvel	5–15, 6–15	(silver) Runner-up
