= Rikke Olsen =

Danish badminton player (born 1975)

Personal information
- Born: 19 April 1975 (age 51) Roskilde, Denmark
- Height: 1.79 m (5 ft 10 in)
- Weight: 65 kg (143 lb)

Sport
- Country: Denmark
- Sport: Badminton
- Handedness: Right

Women's & mixed doubles
- Highest ranking: 2 (WD); 1 (XD)
- BWF profile
Medal record
Women's badminton
Representing Denmark
World Championships
Bronze medal – third place	2003 Birmingham	Women's doubles
Bronze medal – third place	2003 Birmingham	Mixed doubles
Bronze medal – third place	2001 Seville	Mixed doubles
Bronze medal – third place	1999 Copenhagen	Mixed doubles
Bronze medal – third place	1997 Glasgow	Mixed doubles
Bronze medal – third place	1995 Lausanne	Women's doubles
World Cup
Bronze medal – third place	1996 Jakarta	Mixed doubles
Bronze medal – third place	1995 Jakarta	Women's doubles
Sudirman Cup
Silver medal – second place	1999 Copenhagen	Mixed team
Bronze medal – third place	2003 Eindhoven	Mixed team
Bronze medal – third place	2001 Seville	Mixed team
Bronze medal – third place	1997 Glasgow	Mixed team
Bronze medal – third place	1995 Lausanne	Mixed team
Uber Cup
Silver medal – second place	2000 Kuala Lumpur	Women's team
Bronze medal – third place	2004 Jakarta	Women's team
Bronze medal – third place	1998 Hong Kong	Women's team
Bronze medal – third place	1996 Hong Kong	Women's team
European Championships
Gold medal – first place	2000 Glasgow	Mixed doubles
Gold medal – first place	1998 Sofia	Women's doubles
Gold medal – first place	1998 Sofia	Mixed doubles
Gold medal – first place	1996 Herning	Mixed doubles
Silver medal – second place	2004 Geneva	Women's doubles
Silver medal – second place	2004 Geneva	Mixed doubles
Silver medal – second place	2000 Glasgow	Women's doubles
Silver medal – second place	1996 Herning	Women's doubles
Bronze medal – third place	2002 Malmö	Mixed doubles
European Mixed Team Championships
Gold medal – first place	2004 Geneva	Mixed team
Gold medal – first place	2002 Malmö	Mixed team
Gold medal – first place	2000 Glasgow	Mixed team
Gold medal – first place	1998 Sofia	Mixed team
Gold medal – first place	1996 Herning	Mixed team
World Junior Championships
Gold medal – first place	1992 Jakarta	Mixed doubles
European Junior Championships
Gold medal – first place	1993 Sofia	Girls' doubles
Gold medal – first place	1993 Sofia	Mixed team
Bronze medal – third place	1993 Sofia	Girls' singles

Rikke Olsen Siegemund (born 19 April 1975) is a retired badminton player from Denmark. She won the mixed doubles title at the World Junior Championships in 1992 and the girls' doubles title at the European Junior Championships in 1993.

Born in Søndre Roskilde, Olsen came from the badminton family, and started playing at the age of six. She trained in Kastrup-Magleby BK and played for the team for eight seasons, won fourteen National titles, seven World Championships bronze medals, three times runner-up in All England Open, and reached in to the bronze medal match at the Olympic Games in 1996, 2000 and 2004. During her career, she was ranked as world No. 1 in the mixed doubles and No. 2 in the women's doubles. After retiring from the tournament, she became the national junior coach. She is currently performance manager at Badminton New Zealand.

Her sister Lotte Olsen also played badminton at the 1996 Summer Olympics.

== Career ==
Olsen competed in badminton at the 2004 Summer Olympics in women's doubles with partner Ann-Lou Jørgensen. They had a bye in the first round and defeated Nicole Grether and Juliane Schenk of Germany in the second. In the quarterfinals, Olsen and Jørgensen lost to Huang Sui and Gao Ling of China 15-6, 15-7.

She also competed in mixed doubles with partner Jonas Rasmussen. They had a bye in the first round and defeated Daniel Shirley and Sara Petersen of New Zealand in the second. In the quarterfinals, Olsen and Rasmussen beat Kim Dong-moon and Ra Kyung-min of Korea 17-14, 15-8, to advance to the semifinals. There, they lost to Nathan Robertson and Gail Emms of Great Britain 15-6, 15-12. In the bronze medal match, they were defeated by fellow Danish pair Jens Eriksen and Mette Schjoldager 15-5, 15-5, to finish in fourth place.

In February 2018, Olsen Siegemund left her job as Danish Under 19s national coach to start a four-year contract as combined sports manager and national coach for New Zealand.

== Achievements ==
=== World Championships ===
Women's doubles
Year	Venue	Partner	Opponent	Score	Result
1995	Malley Sports Centre, Lausanne, Switzerland	(Denmark) Helene Kirkegaard	(Indonesia) Finarsih (Indonesia) Lili Tampi	8–15, 16–17	Bronze
2003	National Indoor Arena, Birmingham, United Kingdom	(Denmark) Ann-Lou Jørgensen	(China) Gao Ling (China) Huang Sui	2–15, 15–8, 7–15	Bronze

Mixed doubles
Year	Venue	Partner	Opponent	Score	Result
1997	Scotstoun Centre, Glasgow, Scotland	(Denmark) Michael Søgaard	(China) Liu Yong (China) Ge Fei	10–15, 9–15	Bronze
1999	Brøndby Arena, Copenhagen, Denmark	(Denmark) Michael Søgaard	(England) Simon Archer (England) Joanne Goode	5–15, 9–15	Bronze
2001	Palacio de Deportes de San Pablo, Seville, Spain	(Denmark) Michael Søgaard	(South Korea) Kim Dong-moon (South Korea) Ra Kyung-min	7–15, 9–15	Bronze
2003	National Indoor Arena, Birmingham, United Kingdom	(Denmark) Jonas Rasmussen	(China) Zhang Jun (China) Gao Ling	3–15, 15–17	Bronze

=== World Cup ===
Women's doubles
Year	Venue	Partner	Opponent	Score	Result
1995	Istora Senayan, Jakarta, Indonesia	(Denmark) Helene Kirkegaard	(Indonesia) Eliza Nathanael (Indonesia) Zelin Resiana	10–15, 9–15	Bronze

Mixed doubles
Year	Venue	Partner	Opponent	Score	Result
1996	Istora Senayan, Jakarta, Indonesia	(Denmark) Michael Søgaard	(Indonesia) Sandiarto (Indonesia) Minarti Timur	6–15, 15–13, 8–15	Bronze

=== European Championships ===
Women's doubles
Year	Venue	Partner	Opponent	Score	Result
1996	Herning Badminton Klub, Herning, Denmark	(Denmark) Helene Kirkegaard	(Denmark) Lisbeth Stuer-Lauridsen (Denmark) Marlene Thomsen	15–6, 12–15, 10–15	Silver
1998	Winter Sports Palace, Sofia, Bulgaria	(Denmark) Marlene Thomsen	(Denmark) Majken Vange (Denmark) Ann Jørgensen	15–2, 15–10	Gold
2000	Kelvin Hall International Sports Arena, Glasgow, Scotland	(Denmark) Helene Kirkegaard	(England) Donna Kellogg (England) Joanne Goode	15–7, 10–15, 8–15	Silver
2004	Queue d’Arve Sport Center, Geneva, Switzerland	(Denmark) Ann-Lou Jørgensen	(Netherlands) Lotte Bruil (Netherlands) Mia Audina	10–15, 1–15	Silver

Mixed doubles
Year	Venue	Partner	Opponent	Score	Result
1996	Herning Badminton Klub, Herning, Denmark	(Denmark) Michael Søgaard	(England) Simon Archer (England) Julie Bradbury	18–16, 15–2	Gold
1998	Winter Sports Palace, Sofia, Bulgaria	(Denmark) Michael Søgaard	(Germany) Michael Keck (Netherlands) Erica van den Heuvel	15–7, 6–15, 15–11	Gold
2000	Kelvin Hall International Sports Arena, Glasgow, Scotland	(Denmark) Michael Søgaard	(Denmark) Jens Eriksen (Denmark) Mette Schjoldager	15–7, 15–12	Gold
2002	Baltiska hallen, Malmö, Sweden	(Denmark) Michael Søgaard	(England) Nathan Robertson (England) Gail Emms	8–6, 2–7, 1–7, 5–7	Bronze
2004	Queue d’Arve Sport Center, Geneva, Switzerland	(Denmark) Jonas Rasmussen	(England) Nathan Robertson (England) Gail Emms	3–15, 15–8, 5–15	Silver

=== World Junior Championships ===
Mixed doubles
Year	Venue	Partner	Opponent	Score	Result
1992	Istora Senayan, Jakarta, Indonesia	(Denmark) Jim Laugesen	(South Korea) Kim Dong-moon (South Korea) Kim Shin-young	15–11, 18–17	Gold

=== European Junior Championships ===
Girls' singles
Year	Venue	Opponent	Score	Result
1993	Hristo Botev Hall, Sofia, Bulgaria	(Denmark) Mette Sørensen	3–11, 4–11	Bronze

Girls' doubles
Year	Venue	Partner	Opponent	Score	Result
1993	Hristo Botev Hall, Sofia, Bulgaria	(Denmark) Mette Sørensen	(Denmark) Lone Sørensen (Denmark) Sara Runesten	15–10, 15–5	Gold

=== IBF World Grand Prix ===
The World Badminton Grand Prix sanctioned by International Badminton Federation (IBF) since 1983.

Women's doubles
Year	Tournament	Partner	Opponent	Score	Result
1994	French Open	(Denmark) Helene Kirkegaard	(Indonesia) Eny Oktaviani (Indonesia) Nonong Denis Zanati	15–1, 15–7	(gold) Winner
1994	Canadian Open	(Denmark) Helene Kirkegaard	(China) Liu Guimei (China) Peng Yun	15–12, 15–9	(gold) Winner
1994	U.S. Open	(Denmark) Helene Kirkegaard	(China) Liu Guimei (China) Peng Yun	15–4, 15–11	(gold) Winner
1994	Scottish Open	(Denmark) Helene Kirkegaard	(Germany) Katrin Schmidt (Germany) Kerstin Ubben	12–15, 18–15, 9–15	(silver) Runner-up
1995	Chinese Taipei Open	(Denmark) Helene Kirkegaard	(England) Gillian Gowers (Denmark) Lisbet Stuer-Lauridsen	15–5, 15–5	(gold) Winner
1995	Swiss Open	(Denmark) Helene Kirkegaard	(Denmark) Marlene Thomsen (Denmark) Anne-Mette van Dijk	10–15, 15–5, 17–14	(gold) Winner
1995	Denmark Open	(Denmark) Helene Kirkegaard	(Denmark) Lisbet Stuer-Lauridsen (Denmark) Marlene Thomsen	11–15, 11–15	(silver) Runner-up
1996	Swiss Open	(Denmark) Helene Kirkegaard	(Denmark) Lisbet Stuer-Lauridsen (Denmark) Marlene Thomsen	10–15, 10–15	(silver) Runner-up
1996	Swedish Open	(Denmark) Helene Kirkegaard	(South Korea) Kim Mee-hyang (South Korea) Kim Shin-young	13–18, 15–12, 15–10	(gold) Winner
1996	All England Open	(Denmark) Helene Kirkegaard	(China) Ge Fei (China) Gu Jun	3–15, 7–15	(silver) Runner-up
1996	Indonesia Open	(Denmark) Helene Kirkegaard	(Indonesia) Eliza Nathanael (Indonesia) Zelin Resiana	7–15, 4–15	(silver) Runner-up
1996	Russian Open	(Denmark) Helene Kirkegaard	(Sweden) Marina Andrievskaya (Sweden) Christine Gandrup	15–12, 10–15, 15–5	(gold) Winner
1996	Denmark Open	(Denmark) Helene Kirkegaard	(England) Julie Bradbury (England) Joanne Goode	15–6, 15–2	(gold) Winner
1997	Russian Open	(Denmark) Helene Kirkegaard	(Denmark) Ann Jørgensen (Denmark) Majken Vange	15–2, 15–9	(gold) Winner
1997	German Open	(Denmark) Helene Kirkegaard	(Denmark) Lisbet Stuer-Lauridsen (Denmark) Marlene Thomsen	4–15, 15–5, 15–8	(gold) Winner
1998	Swiss Open	(Denmark) Marlene Thomsen	(China) Ge Fei (China) Gu Jun	7–15, 4–15	(silver) Runner-up
1998	Malaysia Open	(Denmark) Marlene Thomsen	(Indonesia) Eliza Nathanael (Indonesia) Zelin Resiana	15–8, 15–4	(gold) Winner
1998	Brunei Open	(Denmark) Marlene Thomsen	(China) Huang Nanyan (China) Yang Wei	11–15, 14–17	(silver) Runner-up
1998	Indonesia Open	(Denmark) Marlene Thomsen	(Indonesia) Eliza Nathanael (Indonesia) Deyana Lomban	15–7, 15–17, 7–15	(silver) Runner-up
1998	World Grand Prix Finals	(Denmark) Marlene Thomsen	(China) Ge Fei (China) Gu Jun	Walkover	(silver) Runner-up
1999	Chinese Taipei Open	(Denmark) Helene Kirkegaard	(China) Huang Nanyan (China) Yang Wei	15–13, 15–4	(gold) Winner
1999	Swiss Open	(Denmark) Mette Sørensen	(Denmark) Ann Jørgensen (Denmark) Majken Vange	15–2, 15–0	(gold) Winner
1999	Indonesia Open	(Denmark) Helene Kirkegaard	(Indonesia) Eliza Nathanael (Indonesia) Deyana Lomban	15–12, 15–7	(gold) Winner
2000	Chinese Taipei Open	(Denmark) Helene Kirkegaard	(South Korea) Chung Jae-hee (South Korea) Ra Kyung-min	6–15, 7–15	(silver) Runner-up
2000	Dutch Open	(Denmark) Helene Kirkegaard	(China) Chen Lin (China) Jiang Xuelian	15–6, 15–7	(gold) Winner
2001	Swiss Open	(Denmark) Helene Kirkegaard	(South Korea) Lee Kyung-won (South Korea) Ra Kyung-min	3–7, 6–8, 7–2, 4–7	(silver) Runner-up
2001	German Open	(Denmark) Helene Kirkegaard	(Denmark) Ann-Lou Jørgensen (Denmark) Mette Schjoldager	7–0, 8–7, 7–0	(gold) Winner
2001	Denmark Open	(Denmark) Helene Kirkegaard	(Denmark) Ann-Lou Jørgensen (Denmark) Mette Schjoldager	7–2, 7–2, 7–3	(gold) Winner
2002	Dutch Open	(Denmark) Ann-Lou Jørgensen	(Thailand) Sathinee Chankrachangwong (Thailand) Saralee Thungthongkam	11–3, 11–5	(gold) Winner
2002	German Open	(Denmark) Ann-Lou Jørgensen	(Netherlands) Lotte Jonathans (Netherlands) Mia Audina	2–11, 2–11	(silver) Runner-up
2003	Korea Open	(Denmark) Ann-Lou Jørgensen	(South Korea) Lee Kyung-won (South Korea) Ra Kyung-min	5–11, 5–11	(silver) Runner-up

Mixed doubles
Year	Tournament	Partner	Opponent	Score	Result
1994	Singapore Open	(Denmark) Jon Holst-Christensen	(Denmark) Thomas Lund (Denmark) Marlene Thomsen	1–15, 15–18	(silver) Runner-up
1994	Canadian Open	(Denmark) Jens Eriksen	(Austria) Jürgen Koch (Austria) Irina Serova	7–15, 2–15	(silver) Runner-up
1994	U.S. Open	(Denmark) Jens Eriksen	(China) Zheng Yushen (China) Xu Huaiwen	15–3, 15–4	(gold) Winner
1995	Chinese Taipei Open	(Denmark) Jens Eriksen	(South Korea) Kim Dong-moon (South Korea) Ra Kyung-min	15–10, 15–5	(gold) Winner
1995	Swiss Open	(Denmark) Jon Holst-Christensen	(Denmark) Thomas Lund (Denmark) Marlene Thomsen	11–15, 14–18	(silver) Runner-up
1995	All England Open	(Denmark) Jon Holst-Christensen	(Denmark) Thomas Lund (Denmark) Marlene Thomsen	7–15, 7–15	(silver) Runner-up
1996	Chinese Taipei Open	(Denmark) Michael Søgaard	(China) Liu Jianjun (China) Sun Man	15–3, 7–15, 15–12	(gold) Winner
1996	Malaysia Open	(Denmark) Michael Søgaard	(Indonesia) Tri Kusharjanto (Indonesia) Minarti Timur	7–15, 5–15	(silver) Runner-up
1996	Russian Open	(Denmark) Michael Søgaard	(China) Chen Xingdong (China) Peng Xinyong	15–11, 12–15, 8–15	(silver) Runner-up
1996	Denmark Open	(Denmark) Michael Søgaard	(Denmark) Thomas Stavngaard (Denmark) Ann Jørgensen	15–5, 15–1	(gold) Winner
1996	China Open	(Denmark) Michael Søgaard	(China) Chen Xingdong (China) Peng Xinyong	10–15, 4–15	(silver) Runner-up
1996	Hong Kong Open	(Denmark) Michael Søgaard	(Denmark) Jens Eriksen (Denmark) Marlene Thomsen	15–8, 15–11	(gold) Winner
1996	World Grand Prix Finals	(Denmark) Michael Søgaard	(Indonesia) Tri Kusharjanto (Indonesia) Minarti Timur	15–10, 15–11	(gold) Winner
1997	German Open	(Denmark) Michael Søgaard	(Denmark) Jens Eriksen (Denmark) Marlene Thomsen	11–15, 15–12, 6–15	(silver) Runner-up
1997	Denmark Open	(Denmark) Michael Søgaard	(Denmark) Jens Eriksen (Denmark) Marlene Thomsen	6–15, 14–18	(silver) Runner-up
1997	Thailand Open	(Denmark) Michael Søgaard	(Denmark) Jens Eriksen (Denmark) Marlene Thomsen	15–5, 15–3	(gold) Winner
1998	All England Open	(Denmark) Michael Søgaard	(South Korea) Kim Dong-moon (South Korea) Ra Kyung-min	2–15, 15–11, 5–15	(silver) Runner-up
1998	Swiss Open	(Denmark) Michael Søgaard	(Denmark) Jens Eriksen (Denmark) Marlene Thomsen	13–18, 15–8, 15–3	(gold) Winner
1998	Malaysia Open	(Denmark) Michael Søgaard	(Indonesia) Tri Kusharjanto (Indonesia) Minarti Timur	8–15, 18–15, 15–18	(silver) Runner-up
1998	Brunei Open	(Denmark) Michael Søgaard	(Denmark) Jens Eriksen (Denmark) Marlene Thomsen	13–15, 6–15	(silver) Runner-up
1998	Singapore Open	(Denmark) Michael Søgaard	(Indonesia) Tri Kusharjanto (Indonesia) Minarti Timur	10–15, 8–15	(silver) Runner-up
1998	Denmark Open	(Denmark) Michael Søgaard	(Denmark) Jon Holst-Christensen (Denmark) Ann Jørgensen	6–15, 14–15	(silver) Runner-up
1998	Indonesia Open	(Denmark) Michael Søgaard	(Indonesia) Tri Kusharjanto (Indonesia) Minarti Timur	15–10, 8–15, 8–15	(silver) Runner-up
1998	Hong Kong Open	(Denmark) Michael Søgaard	(England) Simon Archer (England) Joanne Goode	8–15, 15–7, 15–8	(gold) Winner
1999	Swiss Open	(Denmark) Michael Søgaard	(England) Simon Archer (England) Joanne Goode	5–15, 4–15	(silver) Runner-up
1999	Malaysia Open	(Denmark) Michael Søgaard	(Indonesia) Tri Kusharjanto (Indonesia) Minarti Timur	15–4, 15–7	(gold) Winner
1999	Thailand Open	(Denmark) Michael Søgaard	(China) Liu Yong (China) Ge Fei	12–15, 6–15	(silver) Runner-up
1999	Singapore Open	(Denmark) Michael Søgaard	(South Korea) Kim Dong-moon (South Korea) Ra Kyung-min	4–15, 8–15	(silver) Runner-up
2000	Chinese Taipei Open	(Denmark) Michael Søgaard	(Denmark) Jens Eriksen (Denmark) Mette Schjoldager	15–5, 15–9	(gold) Winner
2000	Indonesia Open	(Denmark) Michael Søgaard	(England) Simon Archer (England) Joanne Goode	13–15, 15–11, 4–15	(silver) Runner-up
2000	Denmark Open	(Denmark) Michael Søgaard	(Denmark) Jens Eriksen (Denmark) Mette Schjoldager	15–10, 8–15, 15–10	(gold) Winner
2001	All England Open	(Denmark) Michael Søgaard	(China) Zhang Jun (China) Gao Ling	15–10, 8–15, 9–15	(silver) Runner-up
2001	Swiss Open	(Denmark) Michael Søgaard	(Denmark) Jens Eriksen (Denmark) Mette Schjoldager	4–7, 7–2, 5–7, 2–7	(silver) Runner-up
2001	Singapore Open	(Denmark) Michael Søgaard	(Denmark) Jens Eriksen (Denmark) Mette Schjoldager	2–7, 7–4, 5–7, 5–7	(silver) Runner-up
2001	China Open	(Denmark) Michael Søgaard	(China) Liu Yong (China) Chen Lin	7–4, 7–8, 7–8, 5–7	(silver) Runner-up
2001	German Open	(Denmark) Michael Søgaard	(Denmark) Michael Lamp (Denmark) Ann-Lou Jørgensen	7–1, 7–4, 7–1	(gold) Winner
2002	Korea Open	(Denmark) Michael Søgaard	(South Korea) Kim Dong-moon (South Korea) Ra Kyung-min	1–7, 3–7, 5–7	(silver) Runner-up
2002	German Open	(Denmark) Jonas Rasmussen	(Indonesia) Anggun Nugroho (Indonesia) Eny Widiowati	11–0, 11–6	(gold) Winner
2004	German Open	(Denmark) Carsten Mogensen	(China) Chen Qiqiu (China) Zhao Tingting	12–15, 15–8, 15–9	(gold) Winner

=== IBF International ===
Women's doubles
Year	Tournament	Partner	Opponent	Score	Result
1993	Polish International	(Denmark) Helene Kirkegaard	(Denmark) Anne Søndergaard (Denmark) Lotte Thomsen	15–17, 15–9, 7–15	(silver) Runner-up
1993	Uppsala International	(Denmark) Helene Kirkegaard	(Denmark) Trine Pedersen (Denmark) Lone Sørensen	15–7, 18–17	(gold) Winner
1993	Norwegian International	(Denmark) Helene Kirkegaard	(Sweden) Catrine Bengtsson (Sweden) Kristin Evernas	Walkover	(silver) Runner-up
1994	Portugal International	(Denmark) Helene Kirkegaard	(Hungary) Andrea Dakó (Hungary) Andrea Harsági	15–6, 15–0	(gold) Winner
1994	Amor International	(Denmark) Charlotte Madsen	(Denmark) Ann Jørgensen (Denmark) Majken Vange	12–15, 9–15	(silver) Runner-up
1994	Hamburg Cup	(Denmark) Helene Kirkegaard	(Denmark) Marlene Thomsen (Denmark) Anne-Mette van Dijk	11–15, 12–15	(silver) Runner-up
1994	Irish International	(Denmark) Helene Kirkegaard	(Sweden) Maria Bengtsson (Sweden) Margit Borg	15–11, 15–12	(gold) Winner
1995	Hamburg Cup	(Denmark) Lotte Olsen	(Netherlands) Eline Coene (Netherlands) Erica van den Heuvel	15–6, 12–15, 15–13	(gold) Winner
1995	Irish International	(Denmark) Mette Schjoldager	(Denmark) Pernille Harder (Denmark) Majken Vange	10–15, 15–4, 9–15	(silver) Runner-up
2002	BMW International	(Denmark) Ann-Lou Jørgensen	(Netherlands) Lotte Jonathans (Netherlands) Mia Audina	11–5, 5–11, 8–11	(silver) Runner-up

Mixed doubles
Year	Tournament	Partner	Opponent	Score	Result
1993	Norwegian International	(Sweden) Rikard Ronnblom	(Norway) Trond Wåland (Norway) Camilla Wright	14–17, 8–15	(silver) Runner-up
1994	Portugal International	(Denmark) Martin Lundgaard Hansen	(Denmark) Thomas Damgaard (Denmark) Helene Kirkegaard	15–12, 15–7	(gold) Winner
1995	Hamburg Cup	(Denmark) Thomas Stavngaard	(Germany) Kai Mitteldorf (Germany) Katrin Schmidt	15–10, 17–18, 7–15	(silver) Runner-up
2002	BMW International	(Denmark) Mathias Boe	(England) Nathan Robertson (England) Gail Emms	9–11, 11–3, 9–11	(silver) Runner-up
