= Helene Kirkegaard =

Danish badminton player (born 1971)

Personal information
- Born: Helene Green Kirkegaard; 5 May 1971 (age 55) Præstevang, Hillerød, Denmark
- Height: 1.73 m (5 ft 8 in)
- Weight: 65 kg (143 lb)

Sport
- Country: Denmark
- Sport: Badminton
- Handedness: Right
- Event: Women's & mixed doubles

Women's & mixed doubles
- BWF profile
Medal record
Women's badminton
Representing Denmark
World Championships
Silver medal – second place	1995 Lausanne	Mixed doubles
Bronze medal – third place	1995 Lausanne	Women's doubles
World Cup
Bronze medal – third place	1995 Jakarta	Women's doubles
Sudirman Cup
Silver medal – second place	1999 Copenhagen	Mixed team
Bronze medal – third place	2001 Seville	Mixed team
Bronze medal – third place	1997 Glasgow	Mixed team
Bronze medal – third place	1995 Lausanne	Mixed team
Uber Cup
Silver medal – second place	2000 Kuala Lumpur	Women's team
Bronze medal – third place	1998 Hong Kong	Women's team
Bronze medal – third place	1996 Hong Kong	Women's team
European Championships
Silver medal – second place	2000 Glasgow	Women's doubles
Silver medal – second place	1996 Herning	Women's doubles
European Mixed Team Championships
Gold medal – first place	2000 Glasgow	Mixed team
Gold medal – first place	1996 Herning	Mixed team
European Junior Championships
Gold medal – first place	1989 Manchester	Mixed team
Silver medal – second place	1989 Manchester	Girls' singles
Silver medal – second place	1989 Manchester	Girls' doubles

Helene Green Kirkegaard (born 5 May 1971) is a Danish retired badminton player from Lillerød badminton club. She competed at the 1996 and 2000 Summer Olympics. At the 1995 IBF World Championships, she won a silver medal in the mixed doubles with Jens Eriksen and a bronze medal in the women's doubles with Rikke Olsen.

== Achievements ==
=== World Championships ===
Women's doubles
Year	Venue	Partner	Opponent	Score	Result
1995	Malley Sports Centre, Lausanne, Switzerland	(Denmark) Rikke Olsen	(Indonesia) Finarsih (Indonesia) Lili Tampi	8–15, 16–17	Bronze

Mixed doubles
Year	Venue	Partner	Opponent	Score	Result
1995	Malley Sports Centre, Lausanne, Switzerland	(Denmark) Jens Eriksen	(Denmark) Thomas Lund (Denmark) Marlene Thomsen	2–15, 6–15	Silver

=== World Cup ===
Women's doubles
Year	Venue	Partner	Opponent	Score	Result
1995	Istora Senayan, Jakarta, Indonesia	(Denmark) Rikke Olsen	(Indonesia) Eliza Nathanael (Indonesia) Zelin Resiana	10–15, 9–15	Bronze

=== European Championships ===
Women's doubles
Year	Venue	Partner	Opponent	Score	Result
2000	Kelvin Hall International Sports Arena; Glasgow, Scotland	(Denmark) Rikke Olsen	(England) Donna Kellogg (England) Joanne Goode	15–7, 10–15, 8–15	Silver
1996	Herning Badminton Klub; Herning, Denmark	(Denmark) Rikke Olsen	(Denmark) Lisbeth Stuer-Lauridsen (Denmark) Marlene Thomsen	15–6, 12–15, 10–15	Silver

=== European Junior Championships ===
Girls' singles
Year	Venue	Opponent	Score	Result
1989	Armitage Centre, Manchester, England	(Denmark) Camilla Martin	4–11, 4–11	Silver

Girls' doubles
Year	Venue	Partner	Opponent	Score	Result
1989	Armitage Centre; Manchester, England	(Denmark) Camilla Martin	(Denmark) Marlene Thomsen (Denmark) Trine Johansson	5–15, 15–13, 5–15	Silver

=== IBF World Grand Prix ===
The World Badminton Grand Prix sanctioned by International Badminton Federation (IBF) since 1983.

Women's doubles
Year	Tournament	Partner	Opponent	Score	Result
2001	Denmark Open	(Denmark) Rikke Olsen	(Denmark) Ann-Lou Jørgensen (Denmark) Mette Schjoldager	7–2, 7–2, 7–3	(gold) Winner
2001	German Open	(Denmark) Rikke Olsen	(Denmark) Ann-Lou Jørgensen (Denmark) Mette Schjoldager	7–0, 8–7, 7–0	(gold) Winner
2001	Swiss Open	(Denmark) Rikke Olsen	(South Korea) Lee Kyung-won (South Korea) Ra Kyung-min	3–7, 6–8, 7–2, 4–7	(silver) Runner-up
2000	Dutch Open	(Denmark) Rikke Olsen	(China) Chen Lin (China) Jiang Xuelian	15–6, 15–7	(gold) Winner
2000	Chinese Taipei Open	(Denmark) Rikke Olsen	(South Korea) Chung Jae-hee (South Korea) Ra Kyung-min	6–15, 7–15	(silver) Runner-up
1999	Indonesia Open	(Denmark) Rikke Olsen	(Indonesia) Eliza Nathanael (Indonesia) Deyana Lomban	15–12, 15–7	(gold) Winner
1999	Chinese Taipei Open	(Denmark) Rikke Olsen	(China) Huang Nanyan (China) Yang Wei	15–13, 15–4	(gold) Winner
1997	German Open	(Denmark) Rikke Olsen	(Denmark) Lisbet Stuer-Lauridsen (Denmark) Marlene Thomsen	4–15, 15–5, 15–8	(gold) Winner
1997	Russian Open	(Denmark) Rikke Olsen	(Denmark) Ann Jørgensen (Denmark) Majken Vange	15–2, 15–9	(gold) Winner
1996	Denmark Open	(Denmark) Rikke Olsen	(England) Julie Bradbury (England) Joanne Goode	15–6, 15–2	(gold) Winner
1996	Russian Open	(Denmark) Rikke Olsen	(Sweden) Marina Andrievskaya (Sweden) Christine Gandrup	15–12, 10–15, 15–5	(gold) Winner
1996	Indonesia Open	(Denmark) Rikke Olsen	(Indonesia) Eliza Nathanael (Indonesia) Zelin Resiana	7–15, 4–15	(silver) Runner-up
1996	All England Open	(Denmark) Rikke Olsen	(China) Ge Fei (China) Gu Jun	3–15, 7–15	(silver) Runner-up
1996	Swedish Open	(Denmark) Rikke Olsen	(South Korea) Kim Mee-hyang (South Korea) Kim Shin-young	13–18, 15–12, 15–10	(gold) Winner
1996	Swiss Open	(Denmark) Rikke Olsen	(Denmark) Lisbet Stuer-Lauridsen (Denmark) Marlene Thomsen	10–15, 10–15	(silver) Runner-up
1995	Denmark Open	(Denmark) Rikke Olsen	(Denmark) Lisbet Stuer-Lauridsen (Denmark) Marlene Thomsen	11–15, 11–15	(silver) Runner-up
1995	Swiss Open	(Denmark) Rikke Olsen	(Denmark) Marlene Thomsen (Denmark) Anne-Mette van Dijk	10–15, 15–5, 17–14	(gold) Winner
1995	Chinese Taipei Open	(Denmark) Rikke Olsen	(England) Gillian Gowers (Denmark) Lisbet Stuer-Lauridsen	15–5, 15–5	(gold) Winner
1994	Scottish Open	(Denmark) Rikke Olsen	(Germany) Katrin Schmidt (Germany) Kerstin Ubben	12–15, 18–15, 9–15	(silver) Runner-up
1994	U.S. Open	(Denmark) Rikke Olsen	(China) Liu Guimei (China) Peng Yun	15–4, 15–11	(gold) Winner
1994	Canadian Open	(Denmark) Rikke Olsen	(China) Liu Guimei (China) Peng Yun	15–12, 15–9	(gold) Winner
1994	French Open	(Denmark) Rikke Olsen	(Indonesia) Eny Oktaviani (Indonesia) Nonong Denis Zanati	15–1, 15–7	(gold) Winner

Mixed doubles
Year	Tournament	Partner	Opponent	Score	Result
1997	Russian Open	(Denmark) Janek Roos	(Denmark) Jon Holst-Christensen (Denmark) Ann Jørgensen	15–8, 10–15, 4–15	(silver) Runner-up
1996	U.S. Open	(England) Chris Hunt	(South Korea) Kim Dong-moon (South Korea) Chung So-young	5–15, 7–15	(silver) Runner-up

=== IBF International ===
Women's doubles
Year	Tournament	Partner	Opponent	Score	Result
1994	Irish International	(Denmark) Rikke Olsen	(Sweden) Maria Bengtsson (Sweden) Margit Borg	15–11, 15–12	(gold) Winner
1994	Hamburg Cup	(Denmark) Rikke Olsen	(Denmark) Marlene Thomsen (Denmark) Anne-Mette van Dijk	11–15, 12–15	(silver) Runner-up
1994	Portugal International	(Denmark) Rikke Olsen	(Hungary) Andrea Dakó (Hungary) Andrea Harsági	15–6, 15–0	(gold) Winner
1993	Norwegian International	(Denmark) Rikke Olsen	(Sweden) Catrine Bengtsson (Sweden) Kristin Evernas	Walkover	(silver) Runner-up
1993	Uppsala International	(Denmark) Rikke Olsen	(Denmark) Trine Pedersen (Denmark) Lone Sørensen	15–7, 18–17	(gold) Winner
1993	Polish International	(Denmark) Rikke Olsen	(Denmark) Anne Søndergaard (Denmark) Lotte Thomsen	15–17, 15–9, 7–15	(silver) Runner-up
1992	Norwegian International	(Denmark) Rikke Broen	(Denmark) Trine Pedersen (Denmark) Anne-Mette van Dijk	11–15, 6–15	(silver) Runner-up
1990	Bulgarian International	(Bulgaria) Diana Koleva	(Germany) Katrin Schmidt (Germany) Kerstin Ubben	15–7, 15–3	(gold) Winner
1990	Czechoslovakian International	(Denmark) Camilla Martin	(Denmark) Trine Johansson (Denmark) Marlene Thomsen	14–17, 8–15	(silver) Runner-up
1990	Polish International	(Denmark) Camilla Martin	(China) Chen Ying (China) Sheng Wengqing	15–18, 1–15	(silver) Runner-up

Mixed doubles
Year	Tournament	Partner	Opponent	Score	Result
1994	Portugal International	(Denmark) Thomas Damgaard	(Denmark) Martin Lundgaard Hansen (Denmark) Rikke Olsen	12–15, 7–15	(silver) Runner-up
