= Ann Jørgensen =

Danish badminton player

Personal information
- Born: 1 October 1973 (age 53) Copenhagen, Denmark
- Height: 1.71 m (5 ft 7 in)
- Weight: 65 kg (143 lb)

Sport
- Country: Denmark
- Sport: Badminton
- Handedness: Right
- Event: Women's doubles
Medal record
Women's badminton
Representing Denmark
World Championships
| Bronze medal – third place | 1999 Copenhagen | Women's doubles |
Sudirman Cup
| Silver medal – second place | 1999 Copenhagen | Mixed team |
Uber Cup
| Bronze medal – third place | 1998 Hong Kong | Women's team |
| Bronze medal – third place | 1996 Hong Kong | Women's team |
European Championships
| Silver medal – second place | 1998 Sofia | Women's doubles |
| Bronze medal – third place | 1998 Sofia | Mixed doubles |
| Bronze medal – third place | 2000 Glasgow | Mixed doubles |
European Mixed Team Championships
| Gold medal – first place | 1998 Sofia | Mixed team |
| Gold medal – first place | 2000 Glasgow | Mixed team |

Ann Jørgensen (born 1 October 1973 in Copenhagen) is a badminton player from Denmark.

== Career ==
Jørgensen competed in badminton at the 1996 and 2000 Summer Olympics.

== Achievements ==
=== World Championships ===
Women's doubles
| Year | Venue | Partner | Opponent | Score | Result |
|---|---|---|---|---|---|
| 1999 | Brøndby Arena; Copenhagen, Denmark | (Denmark) Majken Vange | (South Korea) Chung Jae-hee (South Korea) Ra Kyung-min | 10–15, 15–7, 10–15 | Bronze |

=== European Championships ===
Women's doubles
| Year | Venue | Partner | Opponent | Score | Result |
|---|---|---|---|---|---|
| 1998 | Winter Sports Palace; Sofia, Bulgaria | (Denmark) Majken Vange | (Denmark) Rikke Olsen (Denmark) Marlene Thomsen | 2–15, 10–15 | Silver |

Mixed doubles
| Year | Venue | Partner | Opponent | Score | Result |
|---|---|---|---|---|---|
| 1998 | Winter Sports Palace; Sofia, Bulgaria | (Denmark) Jon Holst-Christensen | (Denmark) Michael Sogaard (Denmark) Rikke Olsen | 6–15, 12–15 | Bronze |
| 2000 | Kelvin Hall International Sports Arena; Glasgow, Scotland | (Denmark) Jon Holst-Christensen | (Denmark) Michael Sogaard (Denmark) Rikke Olsen | 5–15, 15–13, 3–15 | Bronze |

=== IBF World Grand Prix ===
The World Badminton Grand Prix sanctioned by International Badminton Federation (IBF) from 1983 to 2006.

Women's doubles
| Year | Tournament | Partner | Opponent | Score | Result |
|---|---|---|---|---|---|
| 1997 | Russian Open | (Denmark) Majken Vange | (Denmark) Rikke Olsen (Denmark) Helene Kirkegaard | 2–15, 9–15 | (silver) Runner-up |
| 1997 | Denmark Open | (Denmark) Majken Vange | (Japan) Yoshiko Iwata (Japan) Haruko Matsuda | 18–16, 15–5 | (gold) Winner |
| 1999 | Swiss Open | (Denmark) Majken Vange | (Denmark) Rikke Olsen (Denmark) Mette Sorensen | 2–15, 0–15 | (silver) Runner-up |

Mixed doubles
| Year | .Tournament | Partner | Opponent | Score | Result |
|---|---|---|---|---|---|
| 1996 | Denmark Open | (Denmark) Thomas Stavngaard | (Denmark) Michael Søgaard (Denmark) Rikke Olsen | 5–15, 1–15 | (silver) Runner-up |
| 1997 | Russian Open | (Denmark) Jon Holst-Christensen | (Denmark) Janek Roos (Denmark) Helene Kirkegaard | 8–15, 15–10, 15–4 | (gold) Winner |
| 1998 | Dutch Open | (Denmark) Jon Holst Christensen | (China) Chen Qiqiu (China) Yang Wei | 15–7, 15–6 | (gold) Winner |
| 1998 | Denmark Open | (Denmark) Jon Holst Christensen | (Denmark) Michael Sogaard (Denmark) Rikke Olsen | 15–6, 15–14 | (gold) Winner |

=== IBF International ===
Women's doubles
| Year | Tournament | Partner | Opponent | Score | Result |
|---|---|---|---|---|---|
| 1994 | Amor Tournament | (Denmark) Majken Vange | (Denmark) Rikke Olsen (Denmark) Charlotte Madsen | 15–12, 15–9 | (gold) Winner |

Mixed doubles
| Year | Tournament | Partner | Opponent | Score | Result |
|---|---|---|---|---|---|
| 1995 | Malmö International | (Denmark) Thomas Stavngaard | (Denmark) Jesper Larsen (Sweden) Maria Bengtsson | 15–9, 17–14 | (gold) Winner |
