= Alison Humby =

English badminton player

Personal information
- Born: 7 December 1972 (age 53)
- Height: 1.57 m (5 ft 2 in)

Sport
- Country: England
- Sport: Badminton
- Handedness: Left
- Retired: in 1996

Women's singles & doubles
- Highest ranking: 34 (Women's singles)
- BWF profile
Medal record
Women's badminton
Representing England
European Junior Championships
Silver medal – second place	1991 Budapest	Girls' doubles
Bronze medal – third place	1991 Budapest	Girls' singles

Alison Humby (born 7 December 1972) is an English badminton player. Humby is a three time English junior champion, two-time medalist at the European junior championships and winner of several international tournaments in Netherlands, Hungary, Ireland and the EBU circuit in 1992/93. She chose to retire at the age of 23, ending her twelve year badminton career.

== Achievements ==
=== World Junior Championships ===
The Bimantara World Junior Championships was an international invitation badminton tournament for junior players. It was held in Jakarta, Indonesia from 1987 to 1991.

Girls' doubles
Year	Venue	Partner	Opponent	Score	Result
1990	Istora Senayan; Jakarta, Indonesia	(England) Joanne Wright	(China) Liu Hong (China) Ye Zhaoying	13–18, 8–15	Bronze

=== European Junior Championships ===
Girls' singles
Year	Venue	Opponent	Score	Result
1991	BMTE-Törley impozáns sportcsarnokában Budapest, Hungary	(Denmark) Lotte Thomsen	2–11, 2–11	Bronze

Girls' doubles
Year	Venue	Partner	Opponent	Score	Result
1991	BMTE-Törley impozáns sportcsarnokában Budapest, Hungary	(England) Joanne Wright	(Denmark) Mette Pedersen (Denmark) Trine Pedersen	8–15, 6–15	Silver

=== IBF International ===
Women's singles
Year	Tournament	Opponent	Score	Result
1992	Czechoslovakian International	(Austria) Irina Serova	11–6, 7–11, 7–11	(silver) Runner-up
1992	Hungarian International	(England) Tanya Groves	11–5, 11–6	(gold) Winner
1992	Welsh International	(England) Suzanne Louis-Lane	5–11, 1–11	(silver) Runner-up
1995	Hungarian International	(Denmark) Michelle Rasmussen	9–12, 4–11	(silver) Runner-up
1996	La Chaux-de-Fonds International	(Sweden) Marina Andrievskaya	7–11, 11–2, 4–11	(silver) Runner-up
1996	Amor International	(England) Tanya Woodward	11–5, 12–10	(gold) Winner

Women's doubles
Year	Tournament	Partner	Opponent	Score	Result
1990	Welsh International	(England) Joanne Goode	(England) Cheryl Johnson (England) Julie Bradbury	11–15, 8–15	(silver) Runner-up
1991	Irish International	(England) Joanne Goode	(Germany) Katrin Schmidt (Germany) Kerstin Ubben	15–12, 15–11	(gold) Winner
1992	Czechoslovakian International	(England) Sarah Hore	(England) Joanne Davies (England) Tanya Groves	16–17, 10–15	(silver) Runner-up
1992	Hungarian International	(England) Julia Mann	(England) Joanne Davies (England) Tanya Woodward	7–15, 5–15	(silver) Runner-up
1993	Austrian International	(England) Joanne Goode	(Denmark) Anne Søndergaard (Denmark) Lotte Thomsen	13–15, 17–14, 11–15	(silver) Runner-up
1995	Hungarian International	(England) Tanya Woodward	(Kazakhstan) Irina Gritsenko (Kazakhstan) Ludmila Okuneva	15–5, 15–7	(gold) Winner
1996	Portugal International	(England) Tanya Woodward	(England) Emma Constable (England) Tracey Hallam	14–17, 15–4, 7–15	(silver) Runner-up
