= Joris van Soerland =

Dutch badminton player

Personal information
- Born: Joris Evert van Soerland; 15 October 1972 (age 53) Nuenen, North Brabant, Netherlands
- Height: 1.92 m (6 ft 4 in)
- Weight: 82 kg (181 lb)

Sport
- Country: Netherlands
- Sport: Badminton
- Handedness: Right
- Event: Men's singles & doubles

Men's singles & doubles
- BWF profile
Medal record
Men's badminton
Representing Netherlands
European Junior Championships
Silver medal – second place	1991 Budapest	Boys' singles
Silver medal – second place	1991 Budapest	Mixed doubles

Joris Evert van Soerland (born 15 October 1972) is a Dutch badminton player. He competed at the 1996 Summer Olympics in Atlanta, United States.
