= Erica van Dijck =

Dutch badminton player

Personal information
- Born: Henrica Petronella Johanna Maria van den Heuvel; 12 June 1966 (age 60) Helmond, North Brabant, Netherlands
- Height: 1.75 m (5 ft 9 in)

Sport
- Country: Netherlands
- Sport: Badminton
- Handedness: Right
- Event: Doubles

Doubles
- BWF profile
Medal record
Women's badminton
Representing Netherlands
World Cup
Bronze medal – third place	1990 Bandung & Jakarta	Women's doubles
European Championships
Silver medal – second place	1990 Moscow	Women's doubles
Silver medal – second place	1988 Kristiansand	Mixed doubles
Silver medal – second place	1998 Sofia	Mixed doubles
Bronze medal – third place	1994 Den Bosch	Women's doubles
Bronze medal – third place	1998 Sofia	Women's doubles
Bronze medal – third place	1994 Den Bosch	Mixed doubles
Bronze medal – third place	1996 Herning	Mixed doubles
Bronze medal – third place	2000 Glasgow	Mixed doubles
Bronze medal – third place	2000 Glasgow	Mixed team

Henrica Petronella Johanna Maria van den Heuvel (-van Dijck) (born 12 June 1966 in Helmond, North Brabant), known as Erica van Dijck, is a retired female badminton player from the Netherlands. She won the silver medal in mixed doubles at the 1988 European Badminton Championships, with partner Alex Meijer.

She also competed at three Summer Olympic Games, in 1992, 1996, and 2000.
