= 1995 IBF World Championships – Women's singles =

Badminton championships

Women's singles at the 1995 IBF World Championships
- Venue: Malley Sports Centre
- Location: Lausanne, Switzerland
- Dates: May 22, 1995 – May 28, 1995

Medalists
gold medal	Ye Zhaoying	China
silver medal	Han Jingna	China
bronze medal	Susi Susanti	Indonesia
bronze medal	Bang Soo-hyun	South Korea

The 9th IBF World Championships (World Badminton Championships) were held in Lausanne, Switzerland, between 22 May and 28 May 1995. Following the results of the women's singles.

== Main stage ==
=== Section 1 ===
First round
(China) Ye Zhaoying	11	11
(Germany) Nicole Baldewein	2	3
(Canada) Si-An Deng	11	11
(Bulgaria) Rayna Tzvetkova	2	1
(Russia) Marina Yakusheva	11	11
(Brazil) Cristina Nakano	0	2
(Italy) Maria Luisa Mur	8	11	11
(Peru) Silvia Jimenez	11	8	6
(Indonesia) Yuni Kartika	11	11
(Switzerland) Judith Baumeyer	0	4
(Netherlands) Carolien Glebbeek	11	11
(Slovenia) Maja Pohar	5	7
(Sweden) Catrine Bengtsson	12	6	11
(South Korea) Lee Joo Hyun	10	11	6
(England) Sarah Hore	11	8	12
(Hungary) Andrea Harsagi	4	11	10

Second round
(China) Ye Zhaoying	11	11
(Canada) Si-An Deng	1	2
(Russia) Marina Yakusheva	11	11
(Italy) Maria Luisa Mur	6	1
(Indonesia) Yuni Kartika	11	11
(Netherlands) Carolien Glebbeek	1	4
(Sweden) Catrine Bengtsson	11	11
(England) Sarah Hore	6	2

Third round
(China) Ye Zhaoying	11	11
(Russia) Marina Yakusheva	0	1
(Indonesia) Yuni Kartika	11	11
(Sweden) Catrine Bengtsson	0	5

Fourth round
(China) Ye Zhaoying	11	11
(Indonesia) Yuni Kartika	1	5

=== Section 2 ===
First round
(Denmark) Camilla Martin	11	11
(Poland) Dorota Borek	0	0
(France) Sandra Dimbour	11	11
(Ukraine) Elena Nozdran	4	2
(Chinese Taipei) Huang Chia-Chi	11	11
(Iceland) Vigdis Asgeirsdottir	6	1
(England) Tanya Woodward	w.o.
(Kazakhstan) Olesia Sholar
(Japan) Yasuko Mizui	11	11
(Czech Republic) Markéta Koudelková	0	4
(Finland) Anu Weckström	11	11
(Morocco) Fatima Nassim	0	0
(Thailand) Somharuthai Jaroensiri	11	11
(Norway) Camilla Wright	1	3
(Sweden) Astrid Crabo	11	11
(Belarus) Vlada Tcherniavskaia	7	5

Second round
(Denmark) Camilla Martin	11	11
(France) Sandra Dimbour	2	2
(Chinese Taipei) Huang Chia-Chi	10	11	11
(England) Tanya Woodward	12	8	4
(Japan) Yasuko Mizui	11	11
(Finland) Anu Weckström	6	3
(Thailand) Somharuthai Jaroensiri	11	11
(Sweden) Astrid Crabo	2	1

Third round
(Denmark) Camilla Martin	11	11
(Chinese Taipei) Huang Chia-Chi	6	4
(Japan) Yasuko Mizui	11	11
(Thailand) Somharuthai Jaroensiri	6	4

Fourth round
(Denmark) Camilla Martin	11	11
(Japan) Yasuko Mizui	6	6

=== Section 3 ===
First round
(Indonesia) Susi Susanti	11	11
(Trinidad and Tobago) Debra O'Connor	2	0
(Canada) Robbyn Hermitage	9	12	11
(Ukraine) Natalja Esipenko	12	10	6
(New Zealand) Julie Still	11	11
(Cyprus) Christina Christofia	2	3
(Mauritius) Marie-Josephe Jean-Pierre	11	11
(Bulgaria) Emilia Dimitrova	6	5
(China) Yao Yan	11	11
(Italy) Monica Memoli	2	1
(Chinese Taipei) Jeng Shwu-Jen	11	11
(Argentina) Alice Garay	2	0
(Japan) Takako Ida	11	11
(Scotland) Anne Gibson	3	6
(Russia) Irina Yakusheva	11	11
(Germany) Nicole Grether	6	2

Second round
(Indonesia) Susi Susanti	11	11
(Canada) Robbyn Hermitage	0	1
(New Zealand) Julie Still	11	11
(Mauritius) Marie-Josephe Jean-Pierre	7	6
(China) Yao Yan	11	11
(Chinese Taipei) Jeng Shwu-Jen	6	0
(Japan) Takako Ida	11	11
(Russia) Irina Yakusheva	5	1

Third round
(Indonesia) Susi Susanti	11	11
(New Zealand) Julie Still	4	2
(China) Yao Yan	11	11
(Japan) Takako Ida	0	2

Fourth round
(Indonesia) Susi Susanti	11	11
(China) Yao Yan	7	8

=== Section 4 ===
First round
(China) Zhang Ning	11	11
(Pakistan) Aisha Akram	3	0
(Denmark) Mette Sorensen	11	11
(France) Tatiana Vattier	4	7
(Sweden) Christine Gandrup	11	11
(Canada) Heather Poole	1	0
(Kazakhstan) Ludmila Okuneva	11	11
(Slovenia) Darja Kranjc	2	1
(South Korea) Ra Kyung-min	11	11
(United States) Kathy Zimmerman	6	1
(Czech Republic) Eva Lacinová	11	11
(Norway) Sissel Linderoth	4	5
(England) Joanne Muggeridge	11	11
(Switzerland) Santi Wibowo	0	6
(Bulgaria) Neli Boteva	11	11
(Spain) Dolores Marco	8	3

Second round
(China) Zhang Ning	11	11
(Denmark) Mette Sorensen	2	2
(Sweden) Christine Gandrup	11	11
(Kazakhstan) Ludmila Okuneva	4	3
(South Korea) Ra Kyung-min	11	11
(Czech Republic) Eva Lacinová	2	1
(England) Joanne Muggeridge	11	11
(Bulgaria) Neli Boteva	0	1

Third round
(China) Zhang Ning	12	12
(Sweden) Christine Gandrup	10	11
(South Korea) Ra Kyung-min	11	11
(England) Joanne Muggeridge	1	4

Fourth round
(China) Zhang Ning	5	12	11
(South Korea) Ra Kyung-min	11	10	8

=== Section 5 ===
First round160
(China) Han Jingna	11	11
(Canada) Milaine Cloutier	1	1
(Japan) Yoshiko Ohta	11	11
(Croatia) Andrea Jurcic	3	0
(Poland) Katarzyna Krasowska	11	11
(Germany) Viola Rathgeber	0	7
(Nigeria) Olamide Toyin Adebayo	12	11
(Malta) Jo'Anne Grech	10	1
(Indonesia) Yuliani Sentosa	12	2	11
(Wales) Kelly Morgan	9	11	6
(India) Seema Bafna	11	11
(Morocco) Rachida Ait Lamarani	0	0
(Malaysia) Chan Chia Fong	11	11
(Italy) Petra Schrott	0	0
(France) Sandrine Lefevre	11	11
(Belgium) Peggy Mampaey	5	3

Second round
(China) Han Jingna	12	11
(Japan) Yoshiko Ohta	4	10
(Poland) Katarzyna Krasowska	11	11
(Nigeria) Olamide Toyin Adebayo	1	2
(Indonesia) Yuliani Sentosa	11	11
(India) Seema Bafna	8	1
(Malaysia) Chan Chia Fong	11	12
(France) Sandrine Lefevre	1	10

Third round
(China) Han Jingna	11	11
(Poland) Katarzyna Krasowska	2	10
(Indonesia) Yuliani Sentosa	11	11
(Malaysia) Chan Chia Fong	5	1

Fourth round
(China) Han Jingna	11	11
(Indonesia) Yuliani Sentosa	6	8

=== Section 6 ===
First round
(Sweden) Lim Xiaoqing	11	11
(Bulgaria) Victoria Hristova	4	5
(New Zealand) Rhona Robertson	11	11
(Italy) Maria Grazia Italiano	1	0
(South Korea) Kim Ji-hyun	11	11
(Denmark) Anne Sondergaard	5	0
(Iceland) Elsa Nielsen	12	11
(Spain) Patricia Pérez	10	5
(China) Hu Ning	11	11
(Mauritius) Martine de Souza	2	3
(Chinese Taipei) Chan Ya-Lin	11	11
(Scotland) Gillian Martin	6	5
(Singapore) Zarinah Abdullah	11	11
(Slovenia) Ursa Jovan	2	7
(Netherlands) Monique Hoogland	5	11	11
(Finland) Nina Sarnesto	11	2	4

Second round
(Sweden) Lim Xiaoqing	11	11
(New Zealand) Rhona Robertson	4	4
(South Korea) Kim Ji-hyun	11	11
(Iceland) Elsa Nielsen	8	6
(China) Hu Ning	11	11
(Chinese Taipei) Chan Ya-Lin	1	4
(Singapore) Zarinah Abdullah	11	11
(Netherlands) Monique Hoogland	9	3

Third round
(Sweden) Lim Xiaoqing	11	11
(South Korea) Kim Ji-hyun	7	1
(China) Hu Ning	11	11	11
(Singapore) Zarinah Abdullah	12	5	2

Fourth round
(Sweden) Lim Xiaoqing	11	12
(China) Hu Ning	4	9

=== Section 7 ===
First round
(South Korea) Bang Soo-hyun	11	11
(Argentina) Marion Meyer	0	0
(Thailand) Pornsawan Plungwech	11	11
(Switzerland) Silvia Albrecht	2	2
(Indonesia) Cindana Hartono Kusuma	11	11
(Slovenia) Mateja Slatnar	4	0
(Kazakhstan) Irina Gritsenko	6	11	11
(Netherlands) Brenda Beenhakker	11	5	1
(Canada) Denyse Julien	11	11
(Australia) Song Yang	4	4
(Hong Kong) Wang Chen	11	11
(Pakistan) Zarina Jamal	1	1
(Japan) Hisako Mizui	11	11
(Spain) Esther Sanz	2	3
(Chinese Taipei) Jaw Hua-Ching	5	11	11
(France) Christelle Mol	11	8	8

Second round
(South Korea) Bang Soo-hyun	11	11
(Thailand) Pornsawan Plungwech	2	8
(Indonesia) Cindana Hartono Kusuma	11	11
(Kazakhstan) Irina Gritsenko	2	9
(Canada) Denyse Julien	6	11	11
(Hong Kong) Wang Chen	11	6	4
(Japan) Hisako Mizui	11	11
(Chinese Taipei) Jaw Hua-Ching	1	8

Third round
(South Korea) Bang Soo-hyun	11	11
(Indonesia) Cindana Hartono Kusuma	0	5
(Canada) Denyse Julien	12	12
(Japan) Hisako Mizui	10	9

Fourth round
(South Korea) Bang Soo-hyun	11	11
(Canada) Denyse Julien	2	1

=== Section 8 ===
First round
(Indonesia) Mia Audina	8	11	11
(Russia) Elena Rybkina	11	5	7
(Canada) Charmaine Reid	11	11
(Ukraine) Irina Koloskova	4	5
(Japan) Masako Sakamoto	11	11
(Hungary) Andrea Dako	0	0
(England) Julia Mann	11	11
(Peru) Ximena Bellido	0	2
(South Korea) Chung Jae-hee	11	11
(Belarus) Olga Ilioushchenkova	6	7
(Czech Republic) Jitka Lacinová	11	11
(Norway) Tove Hol	7	4
(Denmark) Lotte Thomsen	11	11
(Malaysia) Zamaliah Sidek	3	3
(Germany) Heike Schönharting	11	11
(Italy) Beate Dejaco	0	0

Second round
(Indonesia) Mia Audina	11	11
(Canada) Charmaine Reid	6	3
(Japan) Masako Sakamoto	11	11
(England) Julia Mann	6	4
(South Korea) Chung Jae-hee	11	11
(Czech Republic) Jitka Lacinová	6	8
(Denmark) Lotte Thomsen	11	11
(Germany) Heike Schönharting	0	8

Third round
(Indonesia) Mia Audina	9	11	11
(Japan) Masako Sakamoto	12	4	2
(South Korea) Chung Jae-hee	7	11	11
(Denmark) Lotte Thomsen	11	8	6

Fourth round
(Indonesia) Mia Audina	11	11
(South Korea) Chung Jae-hee	5	4

== Final stage ==
Quarterfinals
(China) Ye Zhaoying	11	11
(Denmark) Camilla Martin	5	8
(Indonesia) Susi Susanti	11	11
(China) Zhang Ning	7	7
(China) Han Jingna	11	4	11
(Sweden) Lim Xiaoqing	4	11	1
(South Korea) Bang Soo-hyun	11	12
(Indonesia) Mia Audina	6	11

Semifinals
(China) Ye Zhaoying	5	11	11
(Indonesia) Susi Susanti	11	8	2
(China) Han Jingna	11	11
(South Korea) Bang Soo-hyun	6	4

Finals
(China) Ye Zhaoying	11	11
(China) Han Jingna	7	0
