= 1994 Uber Cup qualification =

Tournament details
- Dates: 20 – 27 February 1994
- Location: Asian zone: Singapore; European zone: Glasgow

The qualifying process for the 1994 Uber Cup took place from 20 to 27 February 1994 to decide the final teams which would play in the final tournament.

== Qualification process ==
The qualification process was divided into two regions, the Asian Zone and the European Zone. Seeded teams received a bye into the second round while unseeded teams competed in the first round for a place in the second round. The first two rounds were played in a round-robin format. Teams in the second round competed for a place in the knockout stages. Semi-final winners in each zone were guaranteed qualification for the final tournament to be held in Jakarta while the remaining teams competed in a third place playoff match for a place in the final tournament.

China qualified for the final tournament as defending champions while Indonesia qualified as hosts.

=== Qualified teams ===
Country	Qualified as	Qualified on	Final appearance
Indonesia	1994 Uber Cup hosts	11 April 1993	13th
China	1992 Uber Cup winners	16 May 1992	6th
South Korea	Asian Zone winners	27 February 1994	6th
Japan	Asian Zone runners-up	27 February 1994	11th
Thailand	Third place in Asian Zone	27 February 1994	2nd
Denmark	European Zone winners	27 February 1994	9th
Russia	European Zone runners-up	27 February 1994	1st
Sweden	Third place in European Zone	27 February 1994	4th

== Asian Zone ==
The qualification rounds for the Asian Zone were held from 20 to 26 February at Singapore Badminton Hall in Singapore. Twelve teams took part in qualifying for the final tournament.

=== First round ===
==== Group A ====
Pos	Team	Pld	W	L	MF	MA	MD	Pts	Qualification
1	Singapore	2	2	0	7	3	+4	2	Advance to second round
2	Kazakhstan	2	0	2	5	5	0	0	
3	Sri Lanka	2	1	1	3	7	−4	1	
4	Mauritius	0	0	0	0	0	0	0	Withdrew
5	Chinese Taipei	0	0	0	0	0	0	0	Withdrew

Source: The Straits Times

Kazakhstan
3
Singapore Badminton Hall
20 February 1994

Sri Lanka
2

		Result
1	Irina Gritsenko	2 – 0 (11–1, 11–5)	Kaushalya Dissanayake
2	Lyudmila Okuneva	2 – 0 (11–0, 11–0)	K. T. Thushari
3	Saule Koustavletova	2 – 0 (11–1, 11–6)	Chandrika de Silva
4	Elena Dudakova; Irina Gritsenko	0 – 2 (4–15, 8–15)	Chandrika de Silva; Yasintha Liyanage
5	Saule Koustavletova; Lyudmila Okuneva	1 – 2 (18–14, 16–18, 13–15)	Sriyani Deepika; Kaushalya Dissanayake

Singapore
4
Singapore Badminton Hall
20 February 1994

Sri Lanka
1

		Result
1	Zarinah Abdullah	2 – 0 (11–2, 11–0)	Kaushalya Dissanayake
2	Ong Ai Li	2 – 0 (12–9, 11–1)	Yasintha Liyanage
3	Chin Yen Peng	2 – 0 (12–11, 11–4)	Chandrika de Silva
4	Tan Chi Teng; Zarinah Abdullah	2 – 0 (15–4, 15–10)	Inoka Rohini de Silva; Kaushalya Dissanayake
5	Chin Yen Li; Ong Ai Li	0 – 2 (10–15, 9–15)	Chandrika de Silva; Yasintha Liyanage

Singapore
3
Singapore Badminton Hall
21 February 1994

Kazakhstan
2

		Result
1	Zarinah Abdullah	2 – 0 (11–3, 11–1)	Irina Gritsenko
2	Ong Ai Li	1 – 2 (0–11, 11–9, 5–11)	Saule Koustavletova
3	Chin Yen Peng	2 – 1 (5–11, 12–11, 11–2)	Lyudmila Okuneva
4	Tan Chi Teng; Zarinah Abdullah	2 – 1 (15–10, 7–15, 18–17)	Elena Dudakova; Irina Gritsenko
5	Chin Yen Li; Ong Ai Li	0 – 2 (9–15, 8–15)	Saule Koustavletova; Lyudmila Okuneva

==== Group B ====
Pos	Team	Pld	W	L	MF	MA	MD	Pts	Qualification
1	India	2	2	0	10	0	+10	2	Advance to second round
2	Mexico	2	1	1	3	7	−4	1	
3	Nepal	2	0	2	2	8	−6	0	
4	North Korea	0	0	0	0	0	0	0	Withdrew
5	Philippines	0	0	0	0	0	0	0	Withdrew

Source: The Straits Times

Mexico
3
Singapore Badminton Hall
20 February 1994

Nepal
2

		Result
1	María de la Paz Luna	1 – 2	Rajani Joshi Shrestha
2	Ana Laura de la Torre	1 – 2	Kalpana Rana Shrestha
3	María del Carmen Torres	2 – 0	Reema Shrestha
4	María de la Paz Luna; Ana Laura de la Torre	2 – 1	Rajani Joshi Shrestha; Kalpana Rana Shrestha
5	Consuelo Galindo; María del Carmen Torres	2 – 1	Reema Shrestha; Subha Shrestha

India
5
Singapore Badminton Hall
20 February 1994

Nepal
0

		Result
1	Manjusha Pavangadkar	2 – 0	Rajani Joshi Shrestha
2	Seema Bafna	2 – 0	Kalpana Rana Shrestha
3	Krishna Hazarika	2 – 0	Reema Shrestha
4	Sindhu Gulati; Nancy Keith	2 – 0	Rajani Joshi Shrestha; Kalpana Rana Shrestha
5	Seema Bafna; Manjusha Pavangadkar	2 – 0	Reema Shrestha; Subha Shrestha

India
5
Singapore Badminton Hall
21 February 1994

Mexico
0

		Result
1	Manjusha Pavangadkar	2 – 0 (11–0, 11–0)	María de la Paz Luna
2	Seema Bafna	2 – 0 (11–1, 11–0)	Ana Laura de la Torre
3	Krishna Hazarika	2 – 0 (11–0, 11–0)	María del Carmen Torres
4	Sindhu Gulati; Nancy Keith	2 – 0 (15–1, 15–1)	María de la Paz Luna; Ana Laura de la Torre
5	Seema Bafna; Manjusha Pavangadkar	2 – 0 (15–2, 15–1)	Consuelo Galindo; María del Carmen Torres

=== Second round ===
==== Group X ====
Pos	Team	Pld	W	L	MF	MA	MD	Pts	Qualification
1	South Korea	3	3	0	15	0	+15	3	Advance to knockout stage
2	Australia	3	2	1	11	4	+7	2	Advance to knockout stage
3	Hong Kong	3	1	2	6	9	−3	1	
4	Singapore	3	0	3	2	13	−11	0	

Source: The Straits Times

South Korea
5
Singapore Badminton Hall
23 February 1994

Singapore
0

		Result
1	Kim Ji-hyun	2 – 0 (12–11, 11–6)	Zarinah Abdullah
2	Ra Kyung-min	2 – 0 (11–0, 11–2)	Tan Chi Teng
3	Lee Joo-hyun	2 – 0 (11–4, 11–3)	Ong Ai Li
4	Gil Young-ah; Shim Eun-jung	2 – 0 (15–0, 15–0)	Chin Yen Li; Tan Chi Teng
5	Jang Hye-ock; Kim Shin-young	2 – 0 (15–1, 15–1)	Chin Yen Peng; Ong Ai Li

Australia
3
Singapore Badminton Hall
23 February 1994

Hong Kong
2

		Result
1	Song Yang	1 – 2 (2–11, 11–1, 9–12)	Chan Oi Ni
2	Lisa Campbell	2 – 0 (11–3, 11–3)	Cheng Yin Sat
3	Rhonda Cator	2 – 1 (11–9, 3–11, 11–5)	Chung Hoi Yuk
4	Lisa Campbell; Amanda Hardy	2 – 0 (15–9, 15–5)	Cheng Yin Sat; Chung Hoi Yuk
5	Rhonda Cator; Song Yang	1 – 2 (15–10, 10–15, 15–17)	Ngai Fai; Tung Chau Man

South Korea
5
Singapore Badminton Hall
24 February 1994

Hong Kong
0

		Result
1	Bang Soo-hyun	2 – 0 (11–2, 11–5)	Cheng Yin Sat
2	Kim Ji-hyun	2 – 0 (11–1, 11–0)	Koon Wai Chee
3	Lee Joo-hyun	2 – 0 (11–4, 11–0)	Lam Hoi Yee
4	Chung So-young; Gil Young-ah	2 – 0 (15–8, 15–2)	Chan Oi Ni; Ngai Fai
5	Shim Eun-jung; Jang Hye-ock	2 – 0 (15–3, 15–3)	Chung Hoi Yuk; Tung Chau Man

Australia
4
Singapore Badminton Hall
24 February 1994

Singapore
1

		Result
1	Song Yang	0 – 2 (8–11, 2–11)	Zarinah Abdullah
2	Rhonda Cator	2 – 0 (11–2, 11–5)	Chin Yen Peng
3	Lisa Campbell	2 – 0 (11–4, 11–0)	Ong Ai Li
4	Lisa Campbell; Amanda Hardy	2 – 0 (15–3, 15–1)	Chin Yen Li; Tan Chi Teng
5	Michelle O'Neill; Wendy Shinners	2 – 0 (15–6, 15–11)	Chin Yen Peng; Zarinah Abdullah

South Korea
5
Singapore Badminton Hall
25 February 1994

Australia
0

		Result
1	Bang Soo-hyun	2 – 0 (11–0, 11–2)	Song Yang
2	Ra Kyung-min	2 – 0 (11–5, 11–2)	Rhonda Cator
3	Lee Joo-hyun	2 – 0 (11–3, 11–5)	Michelle O'Neill
4	Gil Young-ah; Kim Shin-young	2 – 0 (15–6, 15–2)	Wendy Shinners; Song Yang
5	Jang Hye-ock; Shim Eun-jung	2 – 0 (15–2, 15–2)	Lisa Campbell; Amanda Hardy

Hong Kong
4
Singapore Badminton Hall
25 February 1994

Singapore
1

		Result
1	Chan Oi Ni	0 – 2 (2–11, 3–11)	Zarinah Abdullah
2	Cheng Yin Sat	2 – 0 (11–1, 11–3)	Ong Ai Li
3	Chung Hoi Yuk	2 – 0 (11–0, 11–6)	Chin Yen Peng
4	Cheng Yin Sat; Chung Hoi Yuk	2 – 0 (15–3, 15–2)	Chin Yen Li; Tan Chi Teng
5	Ngai Fai; Tung Chau Man	2 – 0 (15–4, 15–2)	Chin Yen Peng; Ong Ai Li

==== Group Y ====
Pos	Team	Pld	W	L	MF	MA	MD	Pts	Qualification
1	Japan	3	3	0	14	1	+13	3	Advance to second round
2	Thailand	3	2	1	10	5	+5	2	Advance to second round
3	Malaysia	3	1	2	4	11	−7	1	
4	India	3	0	3	2	13	−11	0	

Source: The Straits Times

Japan
5
Singapore Badminton Hall
23 February 1994

India
0

		Result
1	Hisako Mizui	2 – 0 (11–2, 11–3)	Manjusha Pavangadkar
2	Senobu Sasaki	2 – 0 (11–5, 11–6)	Krishna Hazarika
3	Yasuko Mizui	2 – 0 (11–4, 11–4)	Seema Bafna
4	Tomomi Matsuo; Kyoko Sasage	2 – 0 (15–3, 15–5)	Sindhu Gulati; Nancy Keith
5	Tomomi Hirota; Yuko Koike	2 – 0 (15–2, 15–4)	Seema Bafna; Manjusha Pavangadkar

Thailand
4
Singapore Badminton Hall
23 February 1994

Malaysia
1

		Result
1	Somharuthai Jaroensiri	2 – 0 (11–4, 11–1)	Lee Wai Leng
2	Pornsawan Plungwech	2 – 0 (11–3, 11–3)	Leong Yang Cheng
3	Sujitra Ekmongkolpaisarn	2 – 0 (11–7, 11–2)	Chan Chia Fong
4	Plernta Boonyarit; Pornsawan Plungwech	1 – 2 (15–5, 11–15, 1–15)	Lee Wai Leng; Tan Lee Wai
5	Somharuthai Jaroensiri; Piyathip Sansaniyakulvilai	2 – 0 (15–8, 15–2)	Kuak Seok Choon; Zamaliah Sidek

Thailand
5
Singapore Badminton Hall
24 February 1994

India
0

		Result
1	Somharuthai Jaroensiri	2 – 0 (11–9, 11–2)	Manjusha Pavangadkar
2	Pornsawan Plungwech	2 – 0 (11–5, 11–9)	Seema Bafna
3	Sujitra Ekmongkolpaisarn	2 – 0 (11–1, 11–5)	Krishna Hazarika
4	Plernta Boonyarit; Pornsawan Plungwech	2 – 0 (15–12, 15–4)	Sindhu Gulati; Nancy Keith
5	Somharuthai Jaroensiri; Piyathip Sansaniyakulvilai	2 – 0 (15–8, 15–2)	Seema Bafna; Manjusha Pavangadkar

Japan
5
Singapore Badminton Hall
24 February 1994

Malaysia
0

		Result
1	Hisako Mizui	2 – 0 (11–0, 11–4)	Lee Wai Leng
2	Takako Ida	2 – 0 (11–5, 11–2)	Leong Yeng Cheng
3	Yasuko Mizui	2 – 0 (11–6, 11–4)	Chan Chia Fong
4	Tomomi Matsuo; Kyoko Sasage	2 – 1 (15–7, 8–15, 15–4)	Lee Wai Leng; Tan Lee Wai
5	Tokiko Hirota; Yuko Koike	2 – 0 (15–6, 15–5)	Kuak Seok Choon; Zamaliah Sidek

Japan
4
Singapore Badminton Hall
25 February 1994

Thailand
1

		Result
1	Hisako Mizui	0 – 2 (3–11, 5–11)	Somharuthai Jaroensiri
2	Takako Ida	2 – 1 (4–11, 11–7, 12–9)	Pornsawan Plungwech
3	Yasuko Mizui	2 – 0 (11–5, 11–5)	Sujitra Ekmongkolpaisarn
4	Tomomi Matsuo; Kyoko Sasage	2 – 0 (15–11, 15–11)	Plernta Boonyarit; Pornsawan Plungwech
5	Tokiko Hirota; Yuko Koike	2 – 0 (17–16, 15–12)	Somharuthai Jaroensiri; Piyathip Sansaniyakulvilai

Malaysia
3
Singapore Badminton Hall
25 February 1994

India
2

		Result
1	Lee Wai Leng	1 – 2 (12–9, 3–11, 11–12)	Manjusha Pavangadkar
2	Tan Lee Wai	1 – 2 (12–9, 7–11, 10–12)	Seema Bafna
3	Chan Chia Fong	2 – 0 (12–11, 12–11)	Krishna Hazarika
4	Lee Wai Leng; Tan Lee Wai	2 – 1 (10–15, 15–6, 15–5)	Sindhu Gulati; Nancy Keith
5	Kuak Seok Choon; Zamaliah Sidek	2 – 1 (13–18, 15–3, 15–10)	Seema Bafna; Manjusha Pavangadkar

=== Knockout stage ===
Semi-finals
South Korea	5
Thailand	0
Australia	1
Japan	4

Final
South Korea	4
Japan	1
Third place
Thailand	5
Australia	0

==== Semi-finals ====
South Korea
5
Singapore Badminton Hall
26 February 1994

Thailand
0

		Result
1	Bang Soo-hyun	2 – 0 (11–0, 11–0)	Pornsawan Plungwech
2	Kim Ji-hyun	2 – 0 (11–0, 11–2)	Thanissara Chantid
3	Ra Kyung-min	2 – 0 (11–0, 11–1)	Sujitra Ekmongkolpaisarn
4	Gil Young-ah; Shim Eun-jung	2 – 0 (15–2, 15–1)	Dujfan Iangsuwanpatema; Ruksita Sookboonmark
5	Jang Hye-ock; Kim Shin-young	2 – 0 (15–2, 15–9)	Plernta Boonyarit; Piyathip Sansaniyakulvilai

Japan
4
Singapore Badminton Hall
26 February 1994

Australia
1

		Result
1	Hisako Mizui	2 – 0 (11–5, 11–4)	Song Yang
2	Takako Ida	0 – 2 (9–12, 9–12)	Lisa Campbell
3	Yasuko Mizui	2 – 1 (11–4, 3–11, 11–8)	Rhonda Cator
4	Tomomi Matsuo; Kyoko Sasage	2 – 0 (15–1, 15–9)	Lisa Campbell; Amanda Hardy
5	Tokiko Hirota; Yuko Koike	2 – 0 (18–17, 15–11)	Michelle O'Neill; Wendy Shinners

==== Third place ====
Thailand
5
Singapore Badminton Hall
27 February 1994

Australia
0

		Result
1	Somharuthai Jaroensiri	2 – 0 (11–8, 11–2)	Song Yang
2	Pornsawan Plungwech	2 – 0 (11–0, 11–4)	Lisa Campbell
3	Sujitra Ekmongkolpaisarn	2 – 1 (11–8, 8–11, 11–8)	Rhonda Cator
4	Plernta Boonyarit; Pornsawan Plungwech	2 – 1 (15–9, 10–15, 15–12)	Lisa Campbell; Amanda Hardy
5	Somharuthai Jaroensiri; Piyathip Sansaniyakulvilai	2 – 0 (15–9, 17–14)	Michelle O'Neill; Wendy Shinners

==== Final ====
South Korea
4
Singapore Badminton Hall
27 February 1994

Japan
1

		Result
1	Bang Soo-hyun	2 – 0 (11–5, 11–6)	Hisako Mizui
2	Kim Ji-hyun	2 – 0 (11–2, 11–2)	Takako Ida
3	Ra Kyung-min	1 – 2 (11–12, 8–11)	Yasuko Mizui
4	Jang Hye-ock; Shim Eun-jung	2 – 0 (15–6, 15–6)	Tomomi Matsuo; Kyoko Sasage
5	Gil Young-ah; Kim Shin-young	2 – 0 (15–7, 15–4)	Tokiko Hirota; Yuko Koike

== European Zone ==
The European qualifying rounds were held in Kelvin Hall in Glasgow, Scotland. Turkey withdrew from the tournament.

=== First round ===
==== Group A ====
Pos	Team	Pld	W	L	MF	MA	MD	Pts	Qualification
1	Iceland	3	3	0	11	4	+7	3	Advance to second round
2	Spain	3	2	1	7	8	−1	2	
3	Belgium	3	1	2	7	8	−1	1	
4	Israel	3	0	3	5	10	−5	0	

Source: intbadfed.org

Iceland
4
Kelvin Hall
20 February 1994

Spain
1

		Result
1	Elsa Nielsen	2 – 1 (2–11, 12–10, 11–4)	Esther Sanz
2	Vigdís Ásgeirsdóttir	1 – 2 (11–7, 8–11, 0–11)	Dolores Marco
3	Guðrún Júlíusdóttir	2 – 0 (11–3, 12–9)	Patricia Pérez
4	Guðrún Júlíusdóttir; Birna Petersen	2 – 0 (18–16, 15–12)	Dolores Marco; Esther Sanz
5	Þórdís Edwald; Elsa Nielsen	2 – 0 (15–0, 15–10)	Sofía Irizar; Patricia Pérez

Belgium
3
Kelvin Hall
20 February 1994

Israel
2

		Result
1	Annemie Buyse	1 – 2	Svetlana Zilberman
2	Heidi Vrancken	2 – 1	Sigalit Moses
3	Anetha Stamboliyska	2 – 0	Shoshana Moses
4	Caroline Persyn; Anetha Stamboliyska	1 – 2	Sigalit Moses; Svetlana Zilberman
5	Annemie Buyse; Heidi Vrancken	2 – 0	Maybar Ben Ari; Shoshana Moses

Iceland
4
Kelvin Hall
21 February 1994

Israel
1

		Result
1	Vigdís Ásgeirsdóttir	2 – 0 (11–4, 11–3)	Sigalit Moses
2	Guðrún Júlíusdóttir	2 – 0 (12–11, 11–7)	Shoshana Moses
3	Elsa Nielsen	1 – 2 (12–11, 9–11, 5–11)	Svetlana Zilberman
4	Vigdís Ásgeirsdóttir; Guðrún Júlíusdóttir	2 – 0 (15–9, 15–11)	Sigalit Moses; Svetlana Zilberman
5	Þórdís Edwald; Elsa Nielsen	2 – 0 (15–4, 15–0)	Maybar Ben Ari; Shoshana Moses

Belgium
2
Kelvin Hall
21 February 1994

Spain
3

		Result
1	Annemie Buyse	1 – 2	Esther Sanz
2	Caroline Persyn	1 – 2	Dolores Marco
3	Anetha Stamboliyska	2 – 0	Patricia Pérez
4	Caroline Persyn; Anetha Stamboliyska	1 – 2	Dolores Marco; Esther Sanz
5	Annemie Buyse; Heidi Vrancken	2 – 0	Sofía Irizar; Patricia Pérez

Iceland
3
Kelvin Hall
22 February 1994

Belgium
2

		Result
1	Elsa Nielsen	0 – 2 (6–11, 2–11)	Anetha Stamboliyska
2	Birna Petersen	2 – 0 (11–3, 11–7)	Annemie Buyse
3	Þórdís Edwald	1 – 2 (11–4, 5–11, 10–12)	Caroline Persyn
4	Guðrún Júlíusdóttir; Birna Petersen	2 – 0 (15–1, 15–3)	Annemie Buyse; Heidi Vrancken
5	Vigdís Ásgeirsdóttir; Þórdís Edwald	2 – 1 (17–14, 10–15, 15–9)	Mallory Gosset; Caroline Persyn

Spain
3
Kelvin Hall
22 February 1994

Israel
2

		Result
1	Esther Sanz	1 – 2	Svetlana Zilberman
2	Dolores Marco	2 – 1	Sigalit Moses
3	Patricia Pérez	1 – 2	Shoshana Moses
4	Dolores Marco; Esther Sanz	2 – 1	Sigalit Moses; Svetlana Zilberman
5	Sofía Irizar; Patricia Pérez	2 – 1	Maybar Ben Ari; Shoshana Moses

==== Group B ====
Pos	Team	Pld	W	L	MF	MA	MD	Pts	Qualification
1	Switzerland	4	4	0	20	0	+20	4	Advance to second round
2	Slovenia	4	3	1	13	7	+6	3	
3	Peru	4	2	2	10	10	0	2	
4	Portugal	4	1	3	7	13	−6	1	
5	Cyprus	4	0	4	0	20	−20	0	

Source: intbadfed.org

Switzerland
5
Kelvin Hall
20 February 1994

Portugal
0

		Result
1	Silvia Albrecht	2 – 0	Helena Berimbau
2	Bettina Villars	2 – 0	Ana Ferreira
3	Santi Wibowo	2 – 0	Ana Lopes
4	Silvia Albrecht; Santi Wibowo	2 – 0	Helena Berimbau; Anabela Gonçalves
5	Francine Carrel; Bettina Gfeller	2 – 0	Ana Lopes; Sonia Lopes

Peru
2
Kelvin Hall
20 February 1994

Slovenia
3

		Result
1	Maria Teresa Montero	2 – 0	Mateja Slatnar
2	Silvia Jiménez	1 – 2	Maja Pohar
3	Lorena Blanco	2 – 0	Anka Pelhan
4	Silvia Jiménez; Maria Teresa Montero	1 – 2	Urša Jovan; Maja Pohar
5	Lorena Blanco; Ximena Bellido	1 – 2	Darja Kranjc; Mateja Slatnar

Switzerland
5
Kelvin Hall
20 February 1994

Cyprus
0

		Result
1	Silvia Albrecht	2 – 0	Diana Knekna
2	Bettina Villars	2 – 0	Elena Iasonos
3	Santi Wibowo	2 – 0	Maria Iasonos
4	Silvia Albrecht; Santi Wibowo	2 – 0	Diana Knekna; Demetra Ioannou
5	Francine Carrel; Bettina Gfeller	2 – 0	Elena Iasonos; Maria Iasonos

Peru
3
Kelvin Hall
20 February 1994

Portugal
2

		Result
1	Maria Teresa Montero	2 – 0	Helena Berimbau
2	Silvia Jiménez	1 – 2	Ana Ferreira
3	Lorena Blanco	2 – 0	Ana Lopes
4	Silvia Jiménez; Maria Teresa Montero	1 – 2	Helena Berimbau; Anabela Gonçalves
5	Lorena Blanco; Ximena Bellido	2 – 0	Ana Lopes; Sonia Lopes

Portugal
5
Kelvin Hall
21 February 1994

Cyprus
0

		Result
1	Helena Berimbau	2 – 0	Elena Iasonos
2	Ana Ferreira	2 – 0	Maria Iasonos
3	Ana Lopes	2 – 0	Demetra Ioannou
4	Helena Berimbau; Anabela Gonçalves	2 – 1	Diana Knekna; Demetra Ioannou
5	Ana Lopes; Sonia Lopes	2 – 1	Elena Iasonos; Maria Iasonos

Switzerland
5
Kelvin Hall
21 February 1994

Slovenia
0

		Result
1	Silvia Albrecht	2 – 0	Mateja Slatnar
2	Bettina Villars	2 – 0	Maja Pohar
3	Santi Wibowo	2 – 0	Anka Pelhan
4	Silvia Albrecht; Santi Wibowo	2 – 0	Urša Jovan; Maja Pohar
5	Francine Carrel; Bettina Gfeller	2 – 0	Darja Kranjc; Mateja Slatnar

Slovenia
5
Kelvin Hall
21 February 1994

Cyprus
0

		Result
1	Mateja Slatnar	2 – 0	Elena Iasonos
2	Maja Pohar	2 – 0	Maria Iasonos
3	Anka Pelhan	2 – 0	Demetra Ioannou
4	Urša Jovan; Maja Pohar	2 – 1	Diana Knekna; Demetra Ioannou
5	Darja Kranjc; Mateja Slatnar	2 – 0	Elena Iasonos; Maria Iasonos

Switzerland
5
Kelvin Hall
21 February 1994

Peru
0

		Result
1	Silvia Albrecht	2 – 0	Maria Teresa Montero
2	Bettina Villars	2 – 0	Silvia Jiménez
3	Santi Wibowo	2 – 0	Lorena Blanco
4	Silvia Albrecht; Santi Wibowo	2 – 0	Silvia Jiménez; Maria Teresa Montero
5	Francine Carrel; Bettina Gfeller	2 – 0	Lorena Blanco; Ximena Bellido

Slovenia
5
Kelvin Hall
22 February 1994

Portugal
0

		Result
1	Mateja Slatnar	2 – 0	Helena Berimbau
2	Maja Pohar	2 – 0	Ana Ferreira
3	Anka Pelhan	2 – 0	Ana Lopes
4	Urša Jovan; Maja Pohar	2 – 1	Helena Berimbau; Anabela Gonçalves
5	Darja Kranjc; Mateja Slatnar	2 – 0	Ana Lopes; Sonia Lopes

Peru
5
Kelvin Hall
22 February 1994

Cyprus
0

		Result
1	Maria Teresa Montero	2 – 0	Diana Knekna
2	Silvia Jiménez	2 – 0	Elena Iasonos
3	Lorena Blanco	2 – 0	Maria Iasonos
4	Silvia Jiménez; Maria Teresa Montero	2 – 0	Diana Knekna; Demetra Ioannou
5	Lorena Blanco; Ximena Bellido	2 – 0	Elena Iasonos; Maria Iasonos

==== Group C ====
Pos	Team	Pld	W	L	MF	MA	MD	Pts	Qualification
1	France	3	3	0	11	4	+7	3	Advance to second round
2	Wales	3	2	1	11	4	+7	2	
3	Belarus	3	1	2	6	9	−3	1	
4	South Africa	3	0	3	2	13	−11	0	
5	Turkey	0	0	0	0	0	0	0	Withdrew

Source: intbadfed.org

Belarus
4
Kelvin Hall
20 February 1994

South Africa
1

		Result
1	Vlada Chernyavskaya	2 – 0	Augusta Phillips
2	Tatiana Gerassimovitch	1 – 2	Lina Fourie
3	Svetlana Shumskaya	2 – 1	Monique Till
4	Vlada Chernyavskaya; Tatiana Gerassimovitch	2 – 1	Augusta Phillips; Tracey Thompson
5	Olga Ilioushchenkova; Svetlana Shumskaya	2 – 0	Lina Fourie; Beverley Meerholz

Belarus
0
Kelvin Hall
20 February 1994

Wales
5

		Result
1	Vlada Chernyavskaya	0 – 2 (9–12, 5–11)	Kelly Morgan
2	Tatiana Gerassimovitch	1 – 2 (5–11, 11–4, 5–11)	Rachele Phillips
3	Svetlana Shumskaya	0 – 2 (11–12, 7–11)	Gail Davies
4	Vlada Chernyavskaya; Tatiana Gerassimovitch	1 – 2 (12–15, 15–12, 11–15)	Kelly Morgan; Rachele Phillips
5	Olga Ilioushchenkova; Svetlana Shumskaya	0 – 2 (12–15, 6–15)	Gail Davies; Hilary Tarleton

Wales
5
Kelvin Hall
21 February 1994

South Africa
0

		Result
1	Kelly Morgan	2 – 0 (11–1, 11–0)	Augusta Phillips
2	Rachele Phillips	2 – 0 (12–11, 11–1)	Lina Fourie
3	Gail Davies	2 – 0 (11–2, 11–6)	Monique Till
4	Kelly Morgan; Rachele Phillips	2 – 0 (15–9, 15–6)	Augusta Phillips; Tracey Thompson
5	Gail Davies; Hilary Tarleton	2 – 0 (15–5, 15–3)	Lina Fourie; Beverley Meerholz

France
4
Kelvin Hall
21 February 1994

South Africa
1

		Result
1	Sandra Dimbour	2 – 0	Augusta Phillips
2	Christelle Mol	1 – 2	Lina Fourie
3	Sandrine Lefèvre	2 – 0	Monique Till
4	Sandra Dimbour; Christelle Mol	2 – 0	Augusta Phillips; Tracey Thompson
5	Virginie Delvingt; Sandrine Lefèvre	2 – 0	Lina Fourie; Beverley Meerholz

France
4
Kelvin Hall
22 February 1994

Wales
1

		Result
1	Sandra Dimbour	2 – 1 (11–4, 2–11, 12–10)	Kelly Morgan
2	Christelle Mol	2 – 0 (11–8, 11–3)	Rachele Phillips
3	Sandrine Lefèvre	2 – 0 (11–8, 11–2)	Gail Davies
4	Sandra Dimbour; Christelle Mol	2 – 1 (14–17, 15–8, 15–11)	Kelly Morgan; Rachele Phillips
5	Virginie Delvingt; Sandrine Lefèvre	1 – 2 (5–15, 15–2, 8–15)	Gail Davies; Hilary Tarleton

France
3
Kelvin Hall
22 February 1994

Belarus
2

		Result
1	Sandra Dimbour	2 – 0	Vlada Chernyavskaya
2	Christelle Mol	1 – 2	Tatiana Gerassimovitch
3	Sandrine Lefèvre	2 – 0	Svetlana Shumskaya
4	Sandra Dimbour; Christelle Mol	1 – 2	Vlada Chernyavskaya; Tatiana Gerassimovitch
5	Virginie Delvingt; Sandrine Lefèvre	2 – 0	Olga Ilioushchenkova; Svetlana Shumskaya

==== Group D ====
Pos	Team	Pld	W	L	MF	MA	MD	Pts	Qualification
1	Norway	4	3	1	15	5	+10	3	Advance to second round
2	Hungary	4	3	1	13	7	+6	3	
3	Finland	4	3	1	13	7	+6	3	
4	United States	4	1	3	9	11	−2	1	
5	Italy	4	0	4	0	20	−20	0	

Source: intbadfed.org

Finland
2
Kelvin Hall
20 February 1994

Norway
3

		Result
1	Nina Sundberg	2 – 0 (11–5, 11–5)	Tove Hol
2	Malin Virta	0 – 2 (8–11, 9–12)	Camilla Silwer
3	Anu Weckström	0 – 2 (4–11, 4–11)	Sissel Linderoth
4	Nina Sundberg; Malin Virta	0 – 2 (9–15, 7–15)	Sissel Linderoth; Camilla Silwer
5	Nina Sarnesto; Ulrika von Pfaler	2 – 0 (15–10, 15–4)	Nina Haaland; Tove Hol

United States
5
Kelvin Hall
20 February 1994

Italy
0

		Result
1	Linda French	2 – 0 (11–4, 12–9)	Petra Schrott
2	Joy Kitzmiller	2 – 0 (11–1, 11–3)	Monica Memoli
3	Meiling Okuno	2 – 1 (11–12, 11–2, 12–10)	Beate Dejaco
4	Linda French; Joy Kitzmiller	2 – 0 (15–10, 15–3)	Maria Luisa Mur; Petra Schrott
5	Stephanie Wo; Kathy Zimmerman	2 – 0 (15–10, 15–7)	Barbara Faiazza; Monica Memoli

Hungary
5
Kelvin Hall
21 February 1994

Italy
0

		Result
1	Andrea Harsági	2 – 1	Petra Schrott
2	Andrea Dakó	2 – 0	Monica Memoli
3	Andrea Ódor	2 – 0	Beate Dejaco
4	Andrea Dakó; Andrea Harsági	2 – 0	Maria Luisa Mur; Petra Schrott
5	Adrienn Kocsis; Andrea Ódor	2 – 0	Barbara Faiazza; Monica Memoli

United States
2
Kelvin Hall
21 February 1994

Finland
3

		Result
1	Linda French	0 – 2 (6–11, 2–11)	Nina Sundberg
2	Joy Kitzmiller	2 – 1 (11–4, 7–11, 11–4)	Malin Virta
3	Meiling Okuno	0 – 2 (4–11, 8–11)	Nina Sarnesto
4	Linda French; Joy Kitzmiller	0 – 2 (3–15, 9–15)	Nina Sundberg; Malin Virta
5	Stephanie Wo; Kathy Zimmerman	2 – 0 (15–3, 15–12)	Nina Sarnesto; Ulrika von Pfaler

Finland
5
Kelvin Hall
21 February 1994

Italy
0

		Result
1	Nina Sundberg	2 – 0	Petra Schrott
2	Malin Virta	2 – 0	Monica Memoli
3	Nina Sarnesto	2 – 1	Beate Dejaco
4	Nina Sundberg; Malin Virta	2 – 0	Maria Luisa Mur; Petra Schrott
5	Nina Sarnesto; Ulrika von Pfaler	2 – 0	Barbara Faiazza; Monica Memoli

Hungary
3
Kelvin Hall
21 February 1994

Norway
2

		Result
1	Andrea Harsági	2 – 1	Tove Hol
2	Andrea Dakó	1 – 2	Camilla Silwer
3	Andrea Ódor	2 – 0	Sissel Linderoth
4	Andrea Dakó; Andrea Harsági	1 – 2	Sissel Linderoth; Camilla Silwer
5	Adrienn Kocsis; Andrea Ódor	1 – 2	Tove Hol; Lillian Olavesen

Norway
5
Kelvin Hall
22 February 1994

Italy
0

		Result
1	Tove Hol	2 – 0	Petra Schrott
2	Camilla Silwer	2 – 0	Monica Memoli
3	Sissel Linderoth	2 – 1	Beate Dejaco
4	Sissel Linderoth; Camilla Silwer	2 – 0	Maria Luisa Mur; Petra Schrott
5	Nina Haaland; Tove Hol	2 – 0	Barbara Faiazza; Monica Memoli

United States
2
Kelvin Hall
22 February 1994

Hungary
3

		Result
1	Linda French	0 – 2 (0–11, 5–11)	Andrea Harsági
2	Joy Kitzmiller	2 – 1 (9–11, 11–6, 11–4)	Andrea Dakó
3	Kathy Zimmerman	1 – 2 (6–11, 11–7, 4–11)	Andrea Ódor
4	Linda French; Joy Kitzmiller	2 – 0 (15–7, 15–12)	Andrea Dakó; Andrea Harsági
5	Stephanie Wo; Kathy Zimmerman	0 – 2 (12–15, 2–15)	Adrienn Kocsis; Andrea Ódor

United States
0
Kelvin Hall
22 February 1994

Norway
5

		Result
1	Meiling Okuno	0 – 2 (2–11, 6–11)	Tove Hol
2	Stephanie Wo	0 – 2 (3–11, 8–11)	Camilla Silwer
3	Donna Beach	0 – 2 (4–11, 2–11)	Sissel Linderoth
4	Linda French; Stephanie Wo	1 – 2 (8–15, 15–5, 8–15)	Sissel Linderoth; Camilla Silwer
5	Donna Beach; Joy Kitzmiller	0 – 2 (15–18, 11–15)	Tove Hol; Lillian Olavesen

Hungary
2
Kelvin Hall
22 February 1994

Finland
3

		Result
1	Andrea Harsági	2 – 1	Nina Sundberg
2	Andrea Dakó	1 – 2	Malin Virta
3	Andrea Ódor	1 – 2	Nina Sarnesto
4	Andrea Dakó; Andrea Harsági	2 – 1	Nina Sundberg; Malin Virta
5	Adrienn Kocsis; Andrea Ódor	0 – 2	Nina Sarnesto; Ulrika von Pfaler

=== Second round ===
==== Group W ====
Pos	Team	Pld	W	L	MF	MA	MD	Pts	Qualification
1	Denmark	3	3	0	15	0	+15	3	Advance to knockout stage
2	Germany	3	2	1	9	6	+3	2	
3	Poland	3	1	2	5	10	−5	1	
4	Norway	3	0	3	1	14	−13	0	

Source: intbadfed.org

Denmark
5
Kelvin Hall
23 February 1994

Norway
0

		Result
1	Camilla Martin	2 – 0 (11–2, 11–1)	Tove Hol
2	Anne Søndergaard	2 – 0 (11–1, 11–0)	Sissel Linderoth
3	Lotte Thomsen	2 – 0 (11–0, 11–2)	Gunn Hildebrandt
4	Lisbet Stuer-Lauridsen; Marlene Thomsen	2 – 0 (15–2, 15–8)	Sissel Linderoth; Camilla Silwer
5	Anne Søndergaard; Lotte Thomsen	2 – 0 (15–8, 15–4)	Nina Haaland; Lillian Olavesen

Germany
4
Kelvin Hall
23 February 1994

Poland
1

		Result
1	Nicole Grether	0 – 2 (2–11, 2–11)	Katarzyna Krasowska
2	Katrin Schmidt	2 – 0 (11–1, 11–1)	Dorota Borek
3	Stefanie Müller	2 – 0 (11–4, 12–10)	Sylwia Rutkiewicz
4	Nicole Baldewein; Karen Stechmann	2 – 1 (11–15, 15–4, 15–8)	Elżbieta Grzybek; Beata Syta
5	Sandra Beißel; Nicole Grether	2 – 0 (15–8, 15–5)	Dorota Borek; Sylwia Rutkiewicz

Denmark
5
Kelvin Hall
24 February 1994

Poland
0

		Result
1	Camilla Martin	2 – 0 (11–0, 11–2)	Katarzyna Krasowska
2	Anne Søndergaard	2 – 0 (11–2, 11–5)	Dorota Borek
3	Lotte Thomsen	2 – 0 (11–2, 11–5)	Sylwia Rutkiewicz
4	Lotte Olsen; Lisbet Stuer-Lauridsen	2 – 0 (15–7, 15–1)	Elżbieta Grzybek; Beata Syta
5	Anne Søndergaard; Marlene Thomsen	2 – 0 (15–4, 15–1)	Dorota Borek; Sylwia Rutkiewicz

Germany
5
Kelvin Hall
24 February 1994

Norway
0

		Result
1	Nicole Grether	0 – 2 (11–1, 11–8)	Sissel Linderoth
2	Katrin Schmidt	2 – 0 (11–2, 11–1)	Lillian Olavesen
3	Stefanie Müller	2 – 0 (11–3, 11–0)	Gunn Hildebrandt
4	Nicole Baldewein; Karen Stechmann	2 – 0 (15–3, 15–10)	Tove Hol; Camilla Silwer
5	Sandra Beißel; Nicole Grether	2 – 0 (15–7, 15–3)	Nina Haaland; Lillian Olavesen

Denmark
5
Kelvin Hall
25 February 1994

Germany
0

		Result
1	Camilla Martin	2 – 0 (11–1, 11–0)	Nicole Grether
2	Pernille Nedergaard	2 – 1 (11–8, 7–11, 11–7)	Katrin Schmidt
3	Lotte Thomsen	2 – 0 (11–2, 12–11)	Stefanie Müller
4	Lotte Olsen; Lisbet Stuer-Lauridsen	2 – 0 (15–7, 15–4)	Nicole Baldewein; Karen Stechmann
5	Anne Mette Bille; Marlene Thomsen	2 – 0 (15–5, 15–1)	Sandra Beißel; Nicole Grether

Poland
4
Kelvin Hall
25 February 1994

Norway
1

		Result
1	Katarzyna Krasowska	0 – 2 (11–12, 8–11)	Tove Hol
2	Dorota Borek	2 – 0 (12–10, 11–7)	Camilla Silwer
3	Sylwia Rutkiewicz	2 – 1 (12–11, 9–11, 11–5)	Sissel Linderoth
4	Elżbieta Grzybek; Beata Syta	2 – 0 (15–7, 15–5)	Tove Hol; Camilla Silwer
5	Dorota Borek; Sylwia Rutkiewicz	2 – 0 (15–11, 15–3)	Nina Haaland; Lillian Olavesen

==== Group X ====
Pos	Team	Pld	W	L	MF	MA	MD	Pts	Qualification
1	England	3	3	0	13	2	+11	3	Advance to knockout stage
2	Netherlands	3	2	1	9	6	+3	2	
3	New Zealand	3	1	2	8	7	+1	1	
4	Iceland	3	0	3	0	15	−15	0	

Source: intbadfed.org

Netherlands
3
Kelvin Hall
23 February 1994

New Zealand
2

		Result
1	Astrid van der Knaap	2 – 1 (11–12, 11–5, 11–3)	Rhona Robertson
2	Monique Hoogland	2 – 1 (9–12, 12–11, 11–4)	Sheree Jefferson
3	Caroline Glebbeek	2 – 0 (11–5, 11–7)	Amanda Carter
4	Georgy Trouerbach; Nicole van Hooren	2 – 0 (14–18, 7–15)	Sheree Jefferson; Rhona Robertson
5	Eline Coene; Monique Hoogland	0 – 2 (4–15, 8–15)	Tammy Jenkins; Liao Yuejin

England
5
Kelvin Hall
23 February 1994

Iceland
0

		Result
1	Suzanne Louis-Lane	2 – 0 (11–2, 11–0)	Elsa Nielsen
2	Fiona Smith	2 – 0 (11–3, 11–3)	Vigdís Ásgeirsdóttir
3	Alison Humby	2 – 0 (11–2, 11–2)	Guðrún Júlíusdóttir
4	Gillian Gowers; Joanne Wright	2 – 0 (15–3, 15–7)	Guðrún Júlíusdóttir; Birna Petersen
5	Julie Bradbury; Joanne Davies	2 – 0 (15–1, 15–4)	Þórdís Edwald; Elsa Nielsen

Netherlands
5
Kelvin Hall
24 February 1994

Iceland
0

		Result
1	Astrid van der Knaap	2 – 0 (11–1, 11–4)	Elsa Nielsen
2	Monique Hoogland	2 – 0 (11–2, 11–0)	Birna Petersen
3	Caroline Glebbeek	2 – 0 (11–5, 11–4)	Vigdís Ásgeirsdóttir
4	Georgy Trouerbach; Nicole van Hooren	2 – 0 (18–13, 15–6)	Guðrún Júlíusdóttir; Birna Petersen
5	Eline Coene; Astrid van der Knaap	2 – 0 (15–4, 15–5)	Þórdís Edwald; Elsa Nielsen

England
4
Kelvin Hall
24 February 1994

New Zealand
1

		Result
1	Fiona Smith	1 – 2 (11–6, 3–11, 6–11)	Rhona Robertson
2	Alison Humby	2 – 0 (11–6, 11–0)	Sheree Jefferson
3	Sarah Hore	2 – 1 (3–11, 12–9, 11–6)	Amanda Carter
4	Gillian Gowers; Joanne Wright	2 – 0 (15–1, 18–14)	Sheree Jefferson; Rhona Robertson
5	Julie Bradbury; Gillian Clark	2 – 0 (15–3, 15–3)	Tammy Jenkins; Liao Yuejin

Netherlands
1
Kelvin Hall
25 February 1994

England
4

		Result
1	Astrid van der Knaap	1 – 2 (7–11, 11–6, 7–11)	Suzanne Louis-Lane
2	Monique Hoogland	2 – 0 (11–2, 11–5)	Fiona Smith
3	Caroline Glebbeek	1 – 2 (11–7, 10–12, 7–11)	Alison Humby
4	Georgy Trouerbach; Nicole van Hooren	0 – 2 (1–15, 8–15)	Gillian Gowers; Joanne Wright
5	Eline Coene; Astrid van der Knaap	0 – 2 (5–15, 8–15)	Julie Bradbury; Gillian Clark

New Zealand
5
Kelvin Hall
25 February 1994

Iceland
0

		Result
1	Rhona Robertson	2 – 0 (11–7, 11–6)	Elsa Nielsen
2	Sheree Jefferson	2 – 1 (5–11, 11–3, 12–11)	Birna Petersen
3	Amanda Carter	2 – 1 (12–9, 6–11, 11–6)	Vigdís Ásgeirsdóttir
4	Sheree Jefferson; Rhona Robertson	2 – 1 (4–15, 15–11, 15–8)	Guðrún Júlíusdóttir; Birna Petersen
5	Tammy Jenkins; Liao Yuejin	2 – 0 (15–7, 15–2)	Þórdís Edwald; Elsa Nielsen

==== Group Y ====
Pos	Team	Pld	W	L	MF	MA	MD	Pts	Qualification
1	Russia	3	3	0	15	0	+15	3	Advance to knockout stage
2	Canada	3	2	1	10	5	+5	2	
3	Switzerland	3	1	2	3	12	−9	1	
4	Czech Republic	3	0	3	2	13	−11	0	

Source: intbadfed.org

Russia
5
Kelvin Hall
23 February 1994

Switzerland
0

		Result
1	Marina Andrievskaya	2 – 1	Silvia Albrecht
2	Marina Yakusheva	2 – 1	Bettina Villars
3	Irina Yakusheva	2 – 1	Santi Wibowo
4	Marina Andrievskaya; Marina Yakusheva	2 – 0	Silvia Albrecht; Santi Wibowo
5	Nadezhda Chervyakova; Irina Yakusheva	2 – 0	Francine Carrel; Bettina Gfeller

Canada
5
Kelvin Hall
23 February 1994

Czech Republic
0

		Result
1	Heather Ostrom	2 – 0	Jitka Lacinová
2	Caroline Thorn	2 – 1	Markéta Koudelková
3	Marie-Helene Loranger	2 – 1	Diana Stadniková
4	Marie-Helene Loranger; Caroline Thorn	2 – 0	Jitka Lacinová; Diana Stadniková
5	Robbyn Hermitage; Heather Ostrom	2 – 0	Zuzana Kalivodová; Markéta Koudelková

Russia
5
Kelvin Hall
24 February 1994

Czech Republic
0

		Result
1	Marina Andrievskaya	2 – 0	Jitka Lacinová
2	Marina Yakusheva	2 – 0	Markéta Koudelková
3	Irina Yakusheva	2 – 0	Diana Stadniková
4	Marina Andrievskaya; Marina Yakusheva	2 – 0	Jitka Lacinová; Diana Stadniková
5	Nadezhda Chervyakova; Irina Yakusheva	2 – 0	Zuzana Kalivodová; Markéta Koudelková

Canada
5
Kelvin Hall
24 February 1994

Switzerland
0

		Result
1	Heather Ostrom	2 – 1 (11–6, 2–11, 12–9)	Silvia Albrecht
2	Caroline Thorn	2 – 1 (10–12, 12–11, 11–6)	Bettina Villars
3	Marie-Helene Loranger	2 – 0 (11–3, 11–8)	Santi Wibowo
4	Marie-Helene Loranger; Caroline Thorn	2 – 1 (17–18, 15–11, 15–10)	Silvia Albrecht; Santi Wibowo
5	Robbyn Hermitage; Heather Ostrom	2 – 1 (15–8, 5–15, 15–3)	Francine Carrel; Bettina Gfeller

Russia
5
Kelvin Hall
25 February 1994

Canada
0

		Result
1	Marina Andrievskaya	2 – 1	Heather Ostrom
2	Marina Yakusheva	2 – 0	Caroline Thorn
3	Irina Yakusheva	2 – 0	Marie-Helene Loranger
4	Marina Andrievskaya; Marina Yakusheva	2 – 0	Marie-Helene Loranger; Caroline Thorn
5	Nadezhda Chervyakova; Irina Yakusheva	2 – 0	Robbyn Hermitage; Heather Ostrom

Czech Republic
2
Kelvin Hall
25 February 1994

Switzerland
3

		Result
1	Jitka Lacinová	0 – 2 (7–11, 4–11)	Silvia Albrecht
2	Markéta Koudelková	2 – 1 (11–8, 1–11, 12–10)	Bettina Villars
3	Diana Stadniková	1 – 2 (9–12, 11–6, 5–11)	Santi Wibowo
4	Jitka Lacinová; Diana Stadniková	0 – 2 (2–15, 3–15)	Silvia Albrecht; Santi Wibowo
5	Zuzana Kalivodová; Markéta Koudelková	2 – 0 (15–12, 15–13)	Francine Carrel; Bettina Gfeller

==== Group Z ====
Pos	Team	Pld	W	L	MF	MA	MD	Pts	Qualification
1	Sweden	3	3	0	14	1	+13	3	Advance to knockout stage
2	Scotland	3	2	1	10	5	+5	2	
3	France	3	1	2	4	11	−7	1	
4	Bulgaria	3	0	3	1	14	−13	0	

Source: intbadfed.org

Sweden
5
Kelvin Hall
23 February 1994

France
0

		Result
1	Christine Magnusson	2 – 0	Sandra Dimbour
2	Catrine Bengtsson	2 – 0	Christelle Mol
3	Astrid Crabo	2 – 0	Sandrine Lefèvre
4	Catrine Bengtsson; Christine Magnusson	2 – 0	Sandra Dimbour; Christelle Mol
5	Maria Bengtsson; Margit Borg	2 – 0	Virginie Delvingt; Sandrine Lefèvre

Scotland
5
Kelvin Hall
23 February 1994

Bulgaria
0

		Result
1	Anne Gibson	2 – 1 (10–12, 11–7, 11–7)	Neli Nedyalkova
2	Elinor Allen	2 – 0 (17–14, 15–11)	Diana Koleva
3	Gillian Martin	2 – 0 (11–6, 11–5)	Victoria Hristova
4	Elinor Allen; Jennifer Allen	2 – 0 (15–2, 15–6)	Victoria Hristova; Neli Nedyalkova
5	Jillian Haldane; Aileen Travers	2 – 1 (15–5, 13–15, 15–10)	Emilia Dimitrova; Diana Koleva

Sweden
5
Kelvin Hall
24 February 1994

Bulgaria
0

		Result
1	Christine Magnusson	2 – 1 (11–3, 3–11, 11–9)	Neli Nedyalkova
2	Margit Borg	2 – 0 (15–5, 15–4)	Victoria Hristova
3	Karolina Ericsson	2 – 0 (11–4, 11–2)	Dimitriyka Dimitrova
4	Catrine Bengtsson; Maria Bengtsson	2 – 0 (15–0, 15–4)	Victoria Hristova; Neli Nedyalkova
5	Margit Borg; Lotta Andersson	2 – 0 (15–1, 15–8)	Dimitriyka Dimitrova; Emilia Dimitrova

Scotland
5
Kelvin Hall
24 February 1994

France
0

		Result
1	Anne Gibson	2 – 0 (12–9, 11–5)	Sandra Dimbour
2	Elinor Allen	2 – 0 (11–3, 11–4)	Christelle Mol
3	Gillian Martin	2 – 0 (11–6, 11–3)	Sandrine Lefèvre
4	Elinor Allen; Jennifer Allen	2 – 0 (15–4, 15–3)	Sandra Dimbour; Christelle Mol
5	Jillian Haldane; Aileen Travers	2 – 0 (15–3, 15–4)	Virginie Delvingt; Sandrine Lefèvre

Sweden
4
Kelvin Hall
25 February 1994

Scotland
1

		Result
1	Christine Magnusson	2 – 0 (11–4, 11–8)	Anne Gibson
2	Catrine Bengtsson	2 – 0 (11–1, 11–5)	Elinor Allen
3	Astrid Crabo	2 – 1 (4–11, 11–5, 11–5)	Gillian Martin
4	Catrine Bengtsson; Christine Magnusson	2 – 0 (15–7, 15–3)	Elinor Allen; Jennifer Allen
5	Maria Bengtsson; Margit Borg	0 – 2 (8–15, 15–18)	Jillian Haldane; Aileen Travers

Bulgaria
1
Kelvin Hall
25 February 1994

France
4

		Result
1	Neli Nedyalkova	1 – 2	Sandra Dimbour
2	Diana Koleva	2 – 1	Christelle Mol
3	Victoria Hristova	0 – 2	Sandrine Lefèvre
4	Victoria Hristova; Neli Nedyalkova	1 – 2	Sandra Dimbour; Christelle Mol
5	Dimitriyka Dimitrova; Emilia Dimitrova	0 – 2	Virginie Delvingt; Sandrine Lefèvre

=== Knockout stage ===
Semi-finals
Denmark	3
England	2
Russia	3
Sweden	2

Final
Denmark	4
Russia	1
Third place
England	1
Sweden	4

==== Semi-finals ====
Denmark
3
Kelvin Hall
26 February 1994

England
2

		Result
1	Camilla Martin	2 – 0 (11–4, 11–1)	Suzanne Louis-Lane
2	Pernille Nedergaard	2 – 0 (11–5, 12–11)	Fiona Smith
3	Anne Søndergaard	0 – 2 (5–11, 8–11)	Alison Humby
4	Lotte Olsen; Lisbet Stuer-Lauridsen	1 – 2 (10–15, 15–9, 12–15)	Gillian Gowers; Joanne Wright
5	Anne Mette Bille; Marlene Thomsen	2 – 1 (9–15, 15–6, 15–10)	Julie Bradbury; Gillian Clark

Sweden
2
Kelvin Hall
26 February 1994

Russia
3

		Result
1	Christine Magnusson	2 – 1 (11–7, 8–11, 12–10)	Marina Andrievskaya
2	Catrine Bengtsson	0 – 2 (1–11, 10–12)	Marina Yakusheva
3	Margit Borg	0 – 2 (9–12, 4–11)	Irina Yakusheva
4	Catrine Bengtsson; Christine Magnusson	2 – 1 (14–18, 15–7, 15–5)	Elinor Allen; Jennifer Allen
5	Maria Bengtsson; Karolina Ericsson	0 – 2 (9–15, 5–15)	Nadezhda Chervyakova; Irina Yakusheva

==== Third place ====
Sweden
4
Kelvin Hall
27 February 1994

England
1

		Result
1	Christine Magnusson	2 – 0 (11–3, 11–5)	Suzanne Louis-Lane
2	Catrine Bengtsson	2 – 0 (11–8, 11–5)	Fiona Smith
3	Astrid Crabo	2 – 0 (12–9, 11–1)	Alison Humby
4	Catrine Bengtsson; Maria Bengtsson	0 – 2 (9–15, 16–17)	Gillian Gowers; Joanne Wright
5	Margit Borg; Christine Magnusson	2 – 0 (15–12, 15–11)	Julie Bradbury; Joanne Davies

==== Final ====
Denmark
4
Kelvin Hall
27 February 1994

Russia
1

		Result
1	Camilla Martin	2 – 0 (11–2, 11–1)	Marina Andrievskaya
2	Pernille Nedergaard	2 – 0 (11–0, 11–1)	Marina Yakusheva
3	Lotte Thomsen	1 – 2 (11–4, 9–12, 9–12)	Irina Yakusheva
4	Lotte Olsen; Lisbet Stuer-Lauridsen	2 – 0 (15–11, 18–13)	Marina Andrievskaya; Marina Yakusheva
5	Anne Mette Bille; Marlene Thomsen	2 – 0 (15–8, 15–5)	Nadezhda Chervyakova; Irina Yakusheva
