= Badminton at the 1996 Summer Olympics – Women's singles =

Badminton at the Olympics

Women's singles at the Games of the XXVI Olympiad
- Venue: Georgia State University Gymnasium
- Date: 24 July – 1 August 1996
- Competitors: 48 from 31 nations

Medalists
1st place, gold medalist(s)		Bang Soo-hyun	South Korea
2nd place, silver medalist(s)		Mia Audina	Indonesia
3rd place, bronze medalist(s)		Susi Susanti	Indonesia

Women's singles badminton event at the 1996 Summer Olympics was held from 24 July to 1 August 1996. The tournament was single-elimination. Matches consisted of three sets. The tournament was held at the Georgia State University Gymnasium.

== Seeds ==
1. Ye Zhaoying (CHN) (quarterfinals)
2. Susi Susanti (INA) (bronze medalist)
3. Camilla Martin (DEN) (quarterfinals)
4. Bang Soo-hyun (KOR) (gold medalist)
5. Mia Audina (INA) (silver medalist)
6. Han Jingna (CHN) (quarterfinals)
7. Kim Ji-hyun (KOR) (fourth place)
8. Yao Yan (CHN) (quarterfinals)

== Draw ==
=== Finals ===
Quarterfinals
1	Ye Zhaoying (CHN)	5	11
5/8	Kim Ji-hyun (KOR)	11	12
3	Camilla Martin (DEN)	6	11	5
5/8	Mia Audina (INA)	11	8	11
5/8	Yao Yan (CHN)	3	2
4	Bang Soo-hyun (KOR)	11	11
5/8	Han Jingna (CHN)	11	4	8
2	Susi Susanti (INA)	3	11	11

Semifinals
5/8	Kim Ji-hyun (KOR)	6	11	1
5/8	Mia Audina (INA)	11	9	11
4	Bang Soo-hyun (KOR)	11	11
2	Susi Susanti (INA)	9	8

Finals
5/8	Mia Audina (INA)	6	7
4	Bang Soo-hyun (KOR)	11	11
Bronze-medal match
5/8	Kim Ji-hyun (KOR)	4	1
2	Susi Susanti (INA)	11	11

=== Section 1 ===
First round
Margit Borg (SWE)	11	11
Neli Nedjalkova (BUL)	6	4
Elsa Nielsen (ISL)	1	2
Somharuthai Jaroensiri (THA)	11	11
Marie-Josephe Jean-Pierre (MRI)	2	1
Hisako Mizui (JPN)	11	11
Elena Rybkhina (RUS)	11	12
Joanne Muggeridge (GBR)	6	11

Second round
1	Ye Zhaoying (CHN)	11	11
Chan Chia Fong (MAS)	4	1
Margit Borg (SWE)	11	7	11
Somharuthai Jaroensiri (THA)	3	11	5
5/8	Kim Ji-hyun (KOR)	11	11
Sandra Dimbour (FRA)	2	3
Hisako Mizui (JPN)	11	11
Elena Rybkhina (RUS)	1	8

Third round
1	Ye Zhaoying (CHN)	11	11
Margit Borg (SWE)	4	4
5/8	Kim Ji-hyun (KOR)	11	11
Hisako Mizui (JPN)	4	0

Quarterfinals
1	Ye Zhaoying (CHN)
5/8	Kim Ji-hyun (KOR)

=== Section 2 ===
First round
Ra Kyung-min (KOR)	6	7
Huang Chia-Chi (TPE)	11	11
Denyse Julien (CAN)	11	11
Debra O’Connor (TRI)	3	0
Yang Song (AUS)	1	5
Kelly Morgan (GBR)	11	11
Zarinah Abdullah (SIN)	11	11
Elena Nosdran (UKR)	3	0

Second round
3	Camilla Martin (DEN)	11	11
Rhona Robertson (NZL)	2	2
Huang Chia-Chi (TPE)	9	11	11
Denyse Julien (CAN)	11	5	1
5/8	Mia Audina (INA)	11	11
Christine Magnusson (SWE)	6	1
Kelly Morgan (GBR)	12	0	11
Zarinah Abdullah (SIN)	9	11	3

Third round
3	Camilla Martin (DEN)	12	11
Huang Chia-Chi (TPE)	11	9
5/8	Mia Audina (INA)	11	4	12
Kelly Morgan (GBR)	2	11	9

Quarterfinals
3	Camilla Martin (DEN)
5/8	Mia Audina (INA)

=== Section 3 ===
First round
Anne Sondergaard (DEN)
Diana Koleva (BUL)	w/o
Yuliani Sentoso (INA)	6	11	15
Vlada Tcherniavskaya (BLR)	11	3	1
Martine de Souza (MRI)	7	11	3
Santi Wibowo (SUI)	11	7	11
Yasuko Mizui (JPN)	11	8	11
Lisa Campbell (AUS)	0	11	7

Second round
Anne Sondergaard (DEN)	1	3
Yuliani Sentoso (INA)	11	11
Marina Yakusheva (RUS)	4	4
5/8	Yao Yan (CHN)	15	15
Santi Wibowo (SUI)	4	6
Yasuko Mizui (JPN)	11	11
Obiageli Olorunsola (NGR)	0	0
4	Bang Soo-hyun (KOR)	11	11

Third round
Yuliani Sentoso (INA)	6	5
5/8	Yao Yan (CHN)	11	11
Yasuko Mizui (JPN)	2	3
4	Bang Soo-hyun (KOR)	11	11

Quarterfinals
5/8	Yao Yan (CHN)
4	Bang Soo-hyun (KOR)

=== Section 4 ===
First round
Erika von Heiland (USA)	2	6
Jeng Shwu-Zen (TPE)	11	11
Pornsawan Plungwech (THA)	11	4	11
Catrine Bengtsson (SWE)	4	11	6
Anne Gibson (GBR)	6	6
P.V.V. Lakshmi (IND)	11	11
Katarzyna Krasowska (POL)	11	11
Amparo Lim (PHI)	6	5

Second round
Jeng Shwu-Zen (TPE)	5	0
Pornsawan Plungwech (THA)	11	11
Andrea Odor (HUN)	0	1
5/8	Han Jingna (CHN)	11	11
P.V.V. Lakshmi (IND)	5	6
Katarzyna Krasowska (POL)	11	11
Doris Piche (CAN)	1	3
2	Susi Susanti (INA)	11	11

Third round
Pornsawan Plungwech (THA)	3	6
5/8	Han Jingna (CHN)	11	11
Katarzyna Krasowska (POL)	4	0
2	Susi Susanti (INA)	11	11

Quarterfinals
5/8	Han Jingna (CHN)
4	Susi Susanti (INA)

== Sources ==
- The Official Report of the Centennial Olympic Games Volume Three ˗ The Competition Results (PDF). p. 111. Archived from the original (PDF) on 27 September 2007.
