= 1996 All England Open Badminton Championships =

1996 All England Championships
Tournament details
- Dates: 11 March 1996– 16 March 1996
- Edition: 86th
- Location: Birmingham

The 1996 Yonex All England Open was the 86th edition of the All England Open Badminton Championships. It was held from 11 to 16 March 1996, in Birmingham, England.

It was a five-star tournament and the prize money was US$125,000.

== Venue ==
- National Indoor Arena

== Final results ==
Category	Winners	Runners-up	Score
Men's singles	(Denmark) Poul-Erik Høyer Larsen	(Malaysia) Rashid Sidek	15–7, 15–6
Women's singles	(South Korea) Bang Soo-hyun	(China) Ye Zhaoying	11–1, 11–1
Men's doubles	(Indonesia) Ricky Subagja & Rexy Mainaky	(Malaysia) Cheah Soon Kit & Yap Kim Hock	15–6, 15–5
Women's doubles	(China) Ge Fei & Gu Jun	(Denmark) Helene Kirkegaard & Rikke Olsen	15–7, 15–3
Mixed doubles	(South Korea) Park Joo-bong & Ra Kyung-min	(England) Simon Archer & Julie Bradbury	15–10, 15–10

== Men's singles ==
=== Section 1 ===
Round of 32
(Denmark) Poul-Erik Høyer Larsen	15	15
(England) Anders Nielsen	7	9
(Indonesia) Hendrawan	15	13	15
(China) Ge Cheng	4	15	6
(Indonesia) Ardy B. Wiranata	15	15
(Netherlands) Jeroen van Dijk	8	2
(South Korea) Kim Hak-kyun	15	2	15
(Denmark) Jim Laugesen	7	15	10
(South Korea) Park Sung-woo	15	15
(Japan) Seiichi Watanabe	6	3
(Malaysia) Ong Ewe Hock	7	15	15
(Denmark) Soren B Nielsen	15	10	8
(Indonesia) Hariyanto Arbi	15	15
(Finland) Robert Liljequist	0	5
(England) Darren Hall	15	15
(Denmark) Martin Lundgaard Hansen	4	5

Round of 16
(Denmark) Høyer Larsen	18	15
(Indonesia) Hendrawan	17	12
(Indonesia) Wiranata	15	15
(South Korea) Hak-kyun	7	12
(South Korea) Sung-woo	15	15
(Malaysia) Hock	8	2
(Indonesia) Arbi	15	15
(England) Hall	10	10

Quarter-finals
(Denmark) Høyer Larsen	15	15
(Indonesia) Wiranata	10	5
(South Korea) Sung-woo	18	15
(Indonesia) Arbi	16	11

Semi-finals
(Denmark) Høyer Larsen	15	15
(South Korea) Sung-woo	3	6

=== Section 2 ===
Round of 32
(Malaysia) Rashid Sidek	15	15
(Japan) Fumihiko Machida	3	1
(Denmark) Thomas Stuer-Lauridsen	15	15
(India) Vijay Raghavan	5	4
(Chinese Taipei) Fung Permadi	15	15
(Denmark) Kenneth Jonassen	10	4
(Indonesia) Alan Budikusuma	11	15	15
(China) Yu Lizhi	15	5	13
(South Korea) Lee Kwang-jin	6	15	15
(Brunei) Imay Hendra	15	8	9
(Denmark) Peter Gade	15	15
(Indonesia) Hermawan Susanto	11	7
(China) Lin Liwen	15	15
(Indonesia) Joko Suprianto	11	2
(India) Dipankar Bhattacharjee	15	15
(Finland) Lasse Lindelof	5	9

Round of 16
(Malaysia) Sidek	15	9	15
(Denmark) Stuer-Lauridsen	3	15	9
(Chinese Taipei) Permadi	8	18	15
(Indonesia) Kusuma	15	17	13
(South Korea) Kwang-jin	15	15
(Denmark) Gade	13	10
(China) Lin Liwen	15	15
(India) Bhattacharjee	1	12

Quarter-finals
(Malaysia) Sidek	15	5	15
(Chinese Taipei) Permadi	7	15	6
(South Korea) Kwang-jin	17	15
(China) Lin Liwen	16	7

Semi-finals
(Malaysia) Sidek	15	15
(South Korea) Kwang-jin	6	5

== Women's singles ==
=== Section 1 ===
Round of 32
(South Korea) Bang Soo-hyun	11	11
(Philippines) Kennie Asuncion	1	3
(Japan) Takako Ida	11	11
(Canada) Heather Poole	6	1
(Denmark) Camilla Martin	11	11
(South Korea) Lee Soon-deuk	2	2
(China) Zhang Ning	11	8	11
(Indonesia) Lidya Djaelawijaya	1	11	7
(Indonesia) Susi Susanti	11	11
(South Korea) Lee Joo-hyun	3	6
(Denmark) Mette Sorensen	11	4	11
(Japan) Satomi Igawa	7	11	5
(China) Han Jingna	11	11
(Japan) Noriko Hori	1	3
(Denmark) Mette Pedersen	11	3	11
(Japan) Yasuko Mizui	7	11	3

Round of 16
(South Korea) Soo-hyun	11	11
(Japan) Ida	1	0
(Denmark) Martin	11	11
(China) Zhang Ning	8	3
(Indonesia) Susanti	11	11
(Denmark) Sorensen	4	5
(China) Jingna	11	11
(Denmark) Pedersena	1	3

Quarter-finals
(South Korea) Soo-hyun	7	11	12
(Denmark) Martin	11	6	10
(Indonesia) Susanti	12	11
(China) Jingna	10	0

Semi-finals
(South Korea) Soo-hyun	11	5	11
(Indonesia) Susanti	7	11	4

=== Section 2 ===
Round of 32
(China) Ye Zhaoying	11	11
(Russia) Elena Sukhareva	4	4
(Denmark) Lotte Thomsen	w/o
(England) Alison Humby	scr
(China) Dai Yun	11	11
(South Korea) Ra Kyung-min	7	1
(Indonesia) Mia Audina	11	11
(Malaysia) Chia Fong Chan	7	2
(South Korea) Kim Ji-hyun	11	11
(China) Zeng Yaqiong	9	2
(France) Sandra Dimbour	11	12
(Canada) Gillian Martin	5	10
(China) Yao Yan	11	11
(Canada) Charmaine Reid	4	4
(Japan) Misako Mizui	11	11
(Bulgaria) Neli Boteva	1	0

Round of 16
(China) Zhaoying	12	11
(Denmark) Thomsen	9	3
(China) Dai Yun	11	10	11
(Indonesia) Audina	0	12	1
(South Korea) Ji-hyun	11	11
(France) Dimbour	4	3
(China) Yao Yan	11	12
(Japan) Mizui	2	10

Quarter-finals
(China) Zhaoying	11	11
(China) Dai Yun	2	8
(South Korea) Ji-hyun	12	5	11
(China) Yao Yan	11	11	8

Semi-finals
(China) Zhaoying	11	7	11
(South Korea) Ji-Hyun	5	11	5
