= Mizui =

Mizui is a Japanese surname and toponym. Its meaning differs depending on the kanji used to write it.

== Kanji ==
Kanji used to write the name Mizui include:

- 水居, "place where the water is"
- 水井, "water well"
- 瑞衣, "auspicious clothing"
- 心澄衣 "heart-purification clothing"

== People ==
- Hirari Mizui (水井 ひらり, born 2000), Japanese badminton player
- Hisako Mizui, represented Japan in Badminton at the 1996 Summer Olympics – Women's singles
- Seiji Mizui, Japanese rear admiral of the Second World War, commanding officer of the 18th Cruiser Division (Imperial Japanese Navy)
- Yasuko Mizui (水井 泰子, born 1975), Japanese badminton player
- Shinji Mizui (born 1974), member of Pierrot (band)

== Fictional characters ==
- Mizui, character in 2005 Japanese film My God, My God, Why Hast Thou Forsaken Me?

== Places ==
- Mizui Station (水居駅), Echizen Railway Mikuni Awara Line railway station located in Sakai, Fukui Prefecture, Japan
