= Badminton at the 1994 Asian Games – Women's singles =

Women's singles at the 1994 Asian Games
- Venue: Tsuru Memorial Gymnasium
- Dates: 11–15 October
- Competitors: 13 from 7 nations

Medalists
gold medal	Bang Soo-hyun	South Korea
silver medal	Hisako Mizui	Japan
bronze medal	Susi Susanti	Indonesia
bronze medal	Ye Zhaoying	China

The badminton women's singles tournament at the 1994 Asian Games in Hiroshima took place from 11 October to 15 October at Tsuru Memorial Gymnasium.

== Schedule ==
All times are Japan Standard Time (UTC+09:00)

Date	Time	Event
Tuesday, 11 October 1994	13:00	1st round
Thursday, 13 October 1994	13:00	Quarterfinals
Friday, 14 October 1994	13:00	Semifinals
Saturday, 15 October 1994	13:00	Final

== Results ==
1st round
Han Jingna (CHN)	11	11
Ra Kyung-min (KOR)	2	7
Cheng Yin Sat (HKG)	2	8
Pornsawan Plungwech (THA)	11	11
Bang Soo-hyun (KOR)	11	11
Zarinah Abdullah (SIN)	4	3
Somharuthai Jaroensiri (THA)	9	6
3/4	Takako Ida (JPN)	12	11
Yuliani Sentosa (INA)	11	11
Chan Oi Ni (HKG)	8	5

Quarterfinals
1	Susi Susanti (INA)	6	11	11
Han Jingna (CHN)	11	4	7
3/4	Hisako Mizui (JPN)	11	11
Pornsawan Plungwech (THA)	4	8
Bang Soo-hyun (KOR)	11	11
3/4	Takako Ida (JPN)	1	2
Yuliani Sentosa (INA)	11	2	8
2	Ye Zhaoying (CHN)	6	11	11

Semifinals
1	Susi Susanti (INA)	4	5
3/4	Hisako Mizui (JPN)	11	11
Bang Soo-hyun (KOR)	10	11	11
2	Ye Zhaoying (CHN)	12	8	3

Finals
3/4	Hisako Mizui (JPN)	4	6
Bang Soo-hyun (KOR)	11	11
