= Ye Zhaoying =

Chinese badminton player

Ye Zhaoying 叶钊颖
Personal information
- Born: 7 May 1974 (age 52) Hangzhou, Zhejiang, China
- Height: 1.75 m (5 ft 9 in)
- Weight: 65 kg (143 lb)

Sport
- Country: China
- Sport: Badminton
- Handedness: Right

Women's singles
- Highest ranking: 1 (January 1996)
Medal record
Women's badminton
Representing China
Olympic Games
Bronze medal – third place	2000 Sydney	Women's singles
World Championships
Gold medal – first place	1997 Glasgow	Women's singles
Gold medal – first place	1995 Lausanne	Women's singles
Bronze medal – third place	1993 Birmingham	Women's singles
World Cup
Gold medal – first place	1995 Jakarta	Women's singles
Silver medal – second place	1997 Yogyakarta	Women's singles
Bronze medal – third place	1993 New Delhi	Women's singles
Bronze medal – third place	1994 Ho Chi Minh	Women's singles
Bronze medal – third place	1996 Jakarta	Women's singles
Sudirman Cup
Gold medal – first place	1997 Glasgow	Mixed team
Gold medal – first place	1995 Lausanne	Mixed team
Bronze medal – third place	1993 Birmingham	Mixed team
Uber Cup
Gold medal – first place	2000 Kuala Lumpur	Women's team
Gold medal – first place	1998 Hong Kong	Women's team
Gold medal – first place	1992 Kuala Lumpur	Women's team
Silver medal – second place	1996 Hong Kong	Women's team
Silver medal – second place	1994 Jakarta	Women's team
Asian Games
Gold medal – first place	1998 Bangkok	Women's team
Bronze medal – third place	1994 Hiroshima	Women's singles
Bronze medal – third place	1994 Hiroshima	Women's team
Asian Championships
Gold medal – first place	1999 Kuala Lumpur	Women's singles
Gold medal – first place	1998 Bangkok	Women's singles
Gold medal – first place	1995 Beijing	Women's singles
Gold medal – first place	1994 Shanghai	Women's singles
Gold medal – first place	1992 Kuala Lumpur	Women's singles
Asian Cup
Gold medal – first place	1994 Beijing	Women's singles

Ye Zhaoying (simplified Chinese: 叶钊颖; traditional Chinese: 葉釗穎; pinyin: Yè Zhāoyǐng; born 7 May 1974) is a retired badminton player from Hangzhou, China. Officially ranked as the number one women's singles player in the world for the first time in December 1995, she lost and regained that ranking several times during her career. Her best years as a player overlapped those of the slightly older Susi Susanti and Bang Soo-hyun, in what some see as a "golden" era in women's badminton.

She retired after the 2000 Sydney Olympic Games, and in 2002, she started a new career as a golfer, trained at the Tian An Golf Club. She married former Chinese footballer and top-scoring striker Hao Haidong in summer 2019.

== Career ==
Her main achievements include winning the World Grand Prix Finals in 1995, 1997 and 1999, the IBF World Championships in 1995 and 1997, and the IBF World Cup in 1995. She played on Chinese teams that won the Uber Cup in 1992, 1998 and 2000 and the Sudirman Cup in 1995 and 1997. She won the prestigious All-England title in 1997, 1998 and 1999.

Her other titles include: Asian Badminton Championships in 1992, 1994, 1995, 1998, 1999; Japan Open in 1993, 1996, 1999; Indonesia Open in 1992, 1993; Denmark Open in 1993; Hong Kong Open in 1993; Asian Cup of badminton in 1994; China Open in 1995; Swedish Open in 1995; US Open in 1995; Singapore Open in 1992, 1998, 1999; Thailand Open in 2000 . She was a member of the Chinese Women's Badminton Team that won the Asian Games in 1998. In addition, she earned a bronze medal in the Sydney Olympic Games in 2000, having been upset in the quarterfinals of the '96 Games in Atlanta. Ye Zhaoying was elected to the World Badminton Hall of Fame in 2009.

== Personal life ==
Ye married former top footballer Hao Haidong in summer 2019. As of present, she and Hao reside in Málaga, Spain.

== Political views and controversy ==
On the 31st anniversary of the 1989 Tiananmen Square protests in 2020, Hao uploaded a video calling for the overthrow of the Chinese Communist Party. Afterwards the couple's Weibo accounts were deleted; their online profiles on major portals in China – Sina Sports, Tencent Sport and Baidu – have also been deleted. They moved to Spain, living in exile.

Two years later, in an interview with TV 2 Sport with Camilla Martin, Ye stated that the Chinese coaches ordered her to lose in the semi-final match at the 2000 Olympics, in order for her teammate, Gong Zhichao to win the title for China, as she was thought to be able to defeat Martin in the final. She ended up losing in 2 sets to Gong in the semi-final, and went on to win the bronze medal after defeating Dai Yun in the playoff. In the interview, Ye strongly criticized the Chinese system for doing so, and stated that if she had won the match in the semi-final and lost in the final, "all of China" would have considered her a "traitor", adding on that her previous victories would have been "meaningless", had she not won the gold for China.

In response, the Chinese embassy in Denmark issued a statement, stating that Ye "has always been anti-China. Her statements don't deserve a response."

After the entire incident in 2020, family and friends have turned their backs on Hao and Ye, and that they have been blocked by their former teammates on Chinese social messaging platform WeChat.

== Achievements ==
=== Olympic Games ===
Women's singles
Year	Venue	Opponent	Score	Result
2000	The Dome; Sydney, Australia	(China) Dai Yun	8–11, 11–2, 11–6	Bronze

=== World Championships ===
Women's singles
Year	Venue	Opponent	Score	Result
1997	Scotstoun Centre; Glasgow, Scotland	(China) Gong Zhichao	12–11, 11–8	Gold
1995	Malley Sports Centre; Lausanne, Switzerland	(China) Han Jingna	11–7, 11–0	Gold
1993	National Indoor Arena; Birmingham, England	(Indonesia) Susi Susanti	10–12, 10–12	Bronze

=== World Cup ===
Women's singles
Year	Venue	Opponent	Score	Result
1997	Among Rogo Sports Hall; Yogyakarta, Indonesia	(Indonesia) Susi Susanti	8–11, 5–11	Silver
1996	Istora Senayan; Jakarta, Indonesia	(Indonesia) Susi Susanti	2–11, 11–9, 2–11	Bronze
1995	Istora Senayan; Jakarta, Indonesia	(Indonesia) Susi Susanti	12–9, 2–11, 12–9	Gold
1994	Phan Đình Phùng Indoor Stadium; Ho Chi Minh City, Vietnam	(South Korea) Bang Soo-hyun	2–11, 4–11	Bronze
1993	Indira Gandhi Arena; New Delhi, India	(Sweden) Lim Xiaoqing	2–11, 11–2, 6–11	Bronze

=== Asian Games ===
Women's singles
Year	Venue	Opponent	Score	Result
1994	Tsuru Memorial Gymnasium; Hiroshima, Japan	(South Korea) Bang Soo Hyun	12–10, 8–11, 3–11	Bronze

=== Asian Championships ===
Women's singles
Year	Venue	Opponent	Score	Result
1999	Kuala Lumpur, Malaysia	(China) Zhang Ning	11–8, 11–5	Gold
1998	Bangkok, Thailand	(China) Gong Zhichao	11–5, 13–12	Gold
1995	Beijing, China	(China) Yao Yan	11–2, 11–0	Gold
1994	Shanghai Gymnasium; Shanghai, China	(China) Liu Yuhong	11–4, 12–10	Gold
1992	Cheras Indoor Stadium; Kuala Lumpur, Malaysia	(China) Zhou Lei	12–10, 11–2	Gold

=== Asian Cup ===
Women's singles
Year	Venue	Opponent	Score	Result
1994	Beijing, China	(China) Han Jingna	11–6, 9–12, 11–3	Gold

=== IBF World Grand Prix (21 titles, 21 runners-up) ===
The World Badminton Grand Prix sanctioned by International Badminton Federation (IBF) since 1983.

Women's singles
Year	Tournament	Opponent	Score	Result
2000	Thailand Open	(China) Zhou Mi	11–5, 11–0	(gold) Winner
2000	Japan Open	(China) Gong Zhichao	7–11, 3–11	(silver) Runner-up
1999	Grand Prix Finals	(China) Dai Yun	11–4, 6–11, 11–9	(gold) Winner
1999	Singapore Open	(China) Gong Zhichao	11–5, 5–11, 11–7	(gold) Winner
1999	Japan Open	(China) Gong Zhichao	1–11, 11–5, 11–6	(gold) Winner
1999	All England Open	(China) Dai Yun	9–11, 11–5, 11–1	(gold) Winner
1998	Denmark Open	(Denmark) Camilla Martin	10–13, 8–11	(silver) Runner-up
1998	Singapore Open	(Indonesia) Susi Susanti	11–5, 6–11, 11–2	(gold) Winner
1998	Swiss Open	(Denmark) Camilla Martin	9–12, 8–11	(silver) Runner-up
1998	All England Open	(China) Zhang Ning	11–5, 11–8	(gold) Winner
1998	Japan Open	(China) Gong Zhichao	1–11, 4–11	(silver) Runner-up
1997	Grand Prix Finals	(Indonesia) Susi Susanti	11–4, 11–4	(gold) Winner
1997	Malaysia Open	(Indonesia) Susi Susanti	5–11, 7–11	(silver) Runner-up
1997	Swiss Open	(Denmark) Camilla Martin	12–9, 6–11, 5–11	(silver) Runner-up
1997	All England Open	(China) Gong Zhichao	11–3, 11–1	(gold) Winner
1997	Korea Open	(China) Gong Zhichao	6–11, 12–10, 11–4	(gold) Winner
1996	Grand Prix Finals	(Indonesia) Susi Susanti	4–11, 1–11	(silver) Runner-up
1996	All England Open	(South Korea) Bang Soo-hyun	1–11, 1–11	(silver) Runner-up
1996	Japan Open	(Indonesia) Susi Susanti	11–7, 11–8	(gold) Winner
1996	Chinese Taipei Open	(Indonesia) Susi Susanti	5–11, 2–11	(silver) Runner-up
1995	Grand Prix Finals	(Sweden) Lim Xiaoqing	12–10, 8–11, 11–8	(gold) Winner
1995	China Open	(South Korea) Bang Soo-hyun	11–5, 11–0	(gold) Winner
1995	U.S. Open	(South Korea) Bang Soo-hyun	12–10, 3–11, 11–8	(gold) Winner
1995	Swedish Open	(Sweden) Lim Xiaoqing	11–6, 11–6	(gold) Winner
1994	Grand Prix Finals	(Indonesia) Susi Susanti	11–4, 10–12, 4–11	(silver) Runner-up
1994	China Open	(South Korea) Bang Soo-hyun	8–11, 8–11	(silver) Runner-up
1994	Malaysia Open	(Indonesia) Susi Susanti	3–11, 8–11	(silver) Runner-up
1994	All England Open	(Indonesia) Susi Susanti	5–11, 9–11	(silver) Runner-up
1994	Japan Open	(Indonesia) Susi Susanti	6–11, 12–10, 8–11	(silver) Runner-up
1993	Grand Prix Finals	(Indonesia) Susi Susanti	3–11, 9–12	(silver) Runner-up
1993	Hong Kong Open	(China) Han Jingna	10–12, 11–7, 11–1	(gold) Winner
1993	China Open	(China) Han Jingna	10–12, 1–11	(silver) Runner-up
1993	Denmark Open	(China) Liu Yuhong	11–8, 11–1	(gold) Winner
1993	German Open	(Indonesia) Susi Susanti	6–11, 8–11	(silver) Runner-up
1993	Indonesia Open	(Indonesia) Susi Susanti	11–9, 12–11	(gold) Winner
1993	French Open	(China) Yao Yan	7–11, 11–5, 5–11	(silver) Runner-up
1993	Japan Open	(South Korea) Bang Soo-hyun	11–6, 11–5	(gold) Winner
1992	Singapore Open	(China) Han Jingna	8–11, 11–2, 11–3	(gold) Winner
1992	Indonesia Open	(Indonesia) Sarwendah Kusumawardhani	11–7, 11–6	(gold) Winner
1992	Japan Open	(Indonesia) Susi Susanti	2–11, 0–11	(silver) Runner-up

Women's doubles
Year	Tournament	Partner	Opponent	Score	Result
1997	Swiss Open	(China) Han Jingna	(China) Ge Fei (China) Gu Jun	15–9, 2–15, 11–15	(silver) Runner-up
1995	Swedish Open	(China) Han Jingna	(South Korea) Kim Mee-hyang (South Korea) Kim Shin-young	15–12, 12–15, 8–15	(silver) Runner-up

== Record against selected opponents ==
Record against year-end Finals finalists, World Championships semi-finalists, and Olympic quarter-finalists.

Players	Matches	Results		Difference
Players	Matches	Won	Lost	Difference
(China) Dai Yun	10	9	1	+8
(China) Gong Ruina	4	3	1	+2
(China) Gong Zhichao	12	9	3	+6
(China) Han Jingna	6	5	1	+4
(China) Tang Jiuhong	1	0	1	–1
(China) Yao Yan	3	1	2	–1
(China) Zhang Ning	4	4	0	+4
(China) Zhou Mi	2	2	0	+2
(Chinese Taipei) Huang Chia-chi	3	3	0	+3
(Denmark) Camilla Martin	9	6	3	+3
(Denmark) Mette Sørensen	3	3	0	+3

Players	Matches	Results		Difference
Players	Matches	Won	Lost	Difference
(England) Helen Troke	1	1	0	+1
(Germany) Xu Huaiwen	3	3	0	+3
(Indonesia) Sarwendah Kusumawardhani	2	2	0	+2
(Indonesia) Susi Susanti	34	11	23	–12
(Japan) Yasuko Mizui	5	5	0	+5
(Netherlands) / (Indonesia) Mia Audina	8	5	3	+2
(South Korea) Bang Soo-hyun	17	9	8	+1
(South Korea) Kim Ji-hyun	14	11	3	+8
(South Korea) Lee Heung-soon	4	3	1	+2
(Sweden) Lim Xiaoqing	4	2	2	0
(Thailand) Somharuthai Jaroensiri	5	5	0	+5
