= 1995 Asian Badminton Championships =

Badminton championships

Tournament information
- Location: Olympic Sports Center Gymnasium, Beijing, China
- Dates: April 4–April 8

The 1995 Asian Badminton Championships was the 14th edition of the Badminton Asia Championships. It was held in Olympic Sports Center Gymnasium, Beijing, China, from 4 to 8 April. China finished with three titles; while South Korea won men's singles and Malaysia won men's doubles disciplines.

== Medalists ==
Event	Gold	Silver	Bronze
Men's singles	(South Korea) Park Sung-woo	(China) Sun Jun	(China) Ge Cheng
Men's singles	(South Korea) Park Sung-woo	(China) Sun Jun	(China) Dong Jiong
Women's singles	(China) Ye Zhaoying	(China) Yao Yan	(South Korea) Bang Soo-hyun
Women's singles	(China) Ye Zhaoying	(China) Yao Yan	(China) Wang Chen
Men's doubles	(Malaysia) Cheah Soon Kit (Malaysia) Yap Kim Hock	(China) Huang Zhanzhong (China) Jiang Xin	(Thailand) Pramote Teerawiwatana (Thailand) Sakrapee Thongsari
Men's doubles	(Malaysia) Cheah Soon Kit (Malaysia) Yap Kim Hock	(China) Huang Zhanzhong (China) Jiang Xin	(Indonesia) Ade Sutrisna (Indonesia) Candra Wijaya
Women's doubles	(China) Ge Fei (China) Gu Jun	(China) Qin Yiyuan (China) Tang Yongshu	(Indonesia) Eliza Nathanael (Indonesia) Zelin Resiana
Women's doubles	(China) Ge Fei (China) Gu Jun	(China) Qin Yiyuan (China) Tang Yongshu	(China) Peng Xinyong (China) Zhang Jin
Mixed doubles	(China) Liu Jianjun (China) Ge Fei	(China) Jiang Xin (China) Zhang Jin	(Indonesia) Sandiarto (Indonesia) Sri Untari
Mixed doubles	(China) Liu Jianjun (China) Ge Fei	(China) Jiang Xin (China) Zhang Jin	(South Korea) Kim Dong-moon (South Korea) Kim Shin-young

== Medal table ==
Rank	Nation	Gold	Silver	Bronze	Total
1	China (CHN)	3	5	4	12
2	South Korea	1	0	2	3
3	Malaysia (MAS)	1	0	0	1
4	Indonesia (INA)	0	0	3	3
5	Thailand (THA)	0	0	1	1
Totals (5 entries)		5	5	10	20

== Final results ==
=== Men's singles ===
Semi-finals
(South Korea) Park Sung-woo	18	15
(China) Dong Jiong	16	12
(China) Ge Cheng	7	6
(China) Sun Jun	15	15

Final
(South Korea) Park Sung-woo	15	15
(China) Sun Jun	8	8

=== Women's singles ===
Semi-finals
(South Korea) Bang Soo-hyun	11	7	3
(China) Yao Yan	5	11	11
(China) Ye Zhaoying	11	4	11
(China) Wang Chen	4	11	7

Final
(China) Yao Yan	2	0
(China) Ye Zhaoying	11	11

=== Men's doubles ===
Semi-finals
(China) Huang Zhanzhong (China) Jiang Xin	15	15
(Thailand) Pramote Teerawiwatana (Thailand) Sakrapee Thongsari	11	5
(Indonesia) Ade Sutrisna (Indonesia) Candra Wijaya	6	8
(Malaysia) Cheah Soon Kit (Malaysia) Yap Kim Hock	15	15

Final
(China) Huang Zhanzhong (China) Jiang Xin	15	8	7
(Malaysia) Cheah Soon Kit (Malaysia) Yap Kim Hock	7	15	15

=== Women's doubles ===
Semi-finals
(China) Ge Fei (China) Gu Jun	15	15
(Indonesia) Eliza Nathanael (Indonesia) Zelin Resiana	4	5
(China) Peng Xinyong (China) Zhang Jin	3	8
(China) Qin Yiyuan (China) Tang Yongshu	15	15

Final
(China) Ge Fei (China) Gu Jun	15	15
(China) Qin Yiyuan (China) Tang Yongshu	1	4

=== Mixed doubles ===
Semi-finals
(Indonesia) Sandiarto (Indonesia) Sri Untari	17	2	2
(China) Jiang Xin (China) Zhang Jin	14	15	15
(China) Liu Jianjun (China) Ge Fei	18	15
(South Korea) Kim Dong-moon (South Korea) Kim Shin-young	16	11

Final
(China) Jiang Xin (China) Zhang Jin	4	15	5
(China) Liu Jianjun (China) Ge Fei	15	12	15
