= Bang Soo-hyun =

South Korean badminton player (born 1972)

Personal information
- Born: 13 September 1972 (age 54) Seoul, South Korea

Sport
- Country: South Korea
- Sport: Badminton
- Handedness: Right

Women's singles
- Highest ranking: 1
- BWF profile
Medal record
Women's badminton
Representing South Korea
Olympic Games
Gold medal – first place	1996 Atlanta	Women's singles
Silver medal – second place	1992 Barcelona	Women's singles
World Championships
Silver medal – second place	1993 Birmingham	Women's singles
Bronze medal – third place	1995 Lausanne	Women's singles
World Cup
Silver medal – second place	1994 Ho Chi Minh	Women's singles
Bronze medal – third place	1992 Guangzhou	Women's singles
Sudirman Cup
Gold medal – first place	1991 Copenhagen	Mixed team
Gold medal – first place	1993 Birmingham	Mixed team
Bronze medal – third place	1995 Lausanne	Mixed team
Uber Cup
Bronze medal – third place	1996 Hong Kong	Women's team
Silver medal – second place	1992 Kuala Lumpur	Women's team
Asian Games
Gold medal – first place	1994 Hiroshima	Women's singles
Gold medal – first place	1994 Hiroshima	Women's team
Asian Championships
Bronze medal – third place	1995 Beijing	Women's singles
Asian Cup
Gold medal – first place	1995 Qingdao	Women's singles
Silver medal – second place	1991 Jakarta	Women's singles

Bang Soo-hyun (Korean: 방수현; Hanja: 方銖賢; born 13 September 1972) is a former badminton player from South Korea who was one of the world's leading women's singles players of the 1990s. She was a contemporary and rival of Indonesia's Susi Susanti and China's Ye Zhaoying. Noted for a style that combined impressive power and movement, she retired from competition after her victory in the 1996 Atlanta Olympics, shortly before her 24th birthday. She was elected to the World Badminton Hall of Fame in 2019.

== Career ==
=== Summer Olympics ===
Barcelona 1992

Bang competed in badminton at the 1992 Summer Olympics in women's singles. She had a bye in the first round, defeated Catrine Bengtsson of Sweden in the second and Hisuko Mizui of Japan in the third. In quarterfinals Bang Soo-hyun edged Sarwendah Kusumawardhani of Indonesia 11–2, 3–11, 12–11 to advance to the semifinals. There, she beat the reigning world champion Tang Jiuhong of China 11–3, 11–2. In the final, she lost to Indonesia's Susi Susanti 11–5, 5–11, 3–11 to finish with the silver medal.

Atlanta 1996

Bang also competed in the 1996 Atlanta Olympics. She won the gold medal in women's singles without dropping a game in any match, defeating Susi Susanti in semifinals 11–9, 11–8, and Mia Audina in the final, 11–6, 11–7.

=== World Championships ===
She won two medals in the IBF World Championships, in 1993 a silver medal as runner-up to Susanti, and in 1995 a bronze medal.

=== Other championships ===
Bang won the quadrennial Asian Games in 1994, and the prestigious All England Open Badminton Championships over Ye Zhaoying in 1996, having been a runner-up in close matches in both 1992 and 1993. Her other titles included the Welsh (1989), Hong Kong (1992), South Korea (1993, 1994, 1996), Swedish (1993, 1994), and Canadian (1995) Opens.

== Achievements ==
=== Olympic Games ===
Women's singles
Year	Venue	Opponent	Score	Result
1992	Pavelló de la Mar Bella; Barcelona, Spain	(Indonesia) Susi Susanti	11–5, 5–11, 3–11	Silver
1996	GSU Sports Arena; Atlanta, United States	(Indonesia) Mia Audina	11–6, 11–7	Gold

=== World Championships ===
Women's singles
Year	Venue	Opponent	Score	Result
1993	National Indoor Arena; Birmingham, England	(Indonesia) Susi Susanti	11–7, 9–11, 3–11	Silver
1995	Malley Sports Centre; Lausanne, Switzerland	(China) Han Jingna	6–11, 4–11	Bronze

=== World Cup ===
Women's singles
Year	Venue	Opponent	Score	Result
1992	Guangdong Gymnasium; Guangzhou, China	(China) Huang Hua	12–10, 9–11, 9–11	Bronze
1994	Phan Đình Phùng Indoor Stadium; Ho Chi Minh City, Vietnam	(Indonesia) Susi Susanti	9–12, 6–11	Silver

=== Asian Games ===
Women's singles
Year	Venue	Opponent	Score	Result
1994	Tsuru Memorial Gymnasium; Hiroshima, Japan	(Japan) Hisako Mizui	11–4, 11–6	Gold

=== Asian Championships ===
Women's singles
Year	Venue	Opponent	Score	Result
1995	Olympic Sports Center Gymnasium; Beijing, China	(China) Yao Yan	11–5, 7–11, 3–11	Bronze

=== Asian Cup ===
Women's singles
Year	Venue	Opponent	Score	Result
1991	Istora Senayan; Jakarta, Indonesia	(China) Tang Jiuhong	7–11, 11–6, 4–11	Silver
1995	Xinxing Gymnasium; Qingdao, China	(Indonesia) Mia Audina	1–11, 11–2, 13–12	Gold

=== IBF World Grand Prix ===
The World Badminton Grand Prix sanctioned by International Badminton Federation (IBF) from 1983 to 2006.

Women's singles
Year	Tournament	Opponent	Score	Result
1992	Korea Open	(China) Tang Jiuhong	6–11, 3–11	(silver) Runner-up
1992	All England Open	(China) Tang Jiuhong	12–9, 10–12, 1–11	(silver) Runner-up
1992	Hong Kong Open	(Indonesia) Susi Susanti	5–11, 11–6, 11–7	(gold) Winner
1992	Thailand Open	(Indonesia) Susi Susanti	7–11, 4–11	(silver) Runner-up
1993	Japan Open	(China) Ye Zhaoying	6–11, 5–11	(silver) Runner-up
1993	Korea Open	(Indonesia) Susi Susanti	12–9, 11–5	(gold) Winner
1993	Swedish Open	(South Korea) Lee Heung-soon	11–2, 11–6	(gold) Winner
1993	All England Open	(Indonesia) Susi Susanti	11–4, 4–11, 1–11	(silver) Runner-up
1994	Korea Open	(South Korea) Kim Ji-hyun	11–5, 11–5	(gold) Winner
1994	Swedish Open	(South Korea) Kim Ji-hyun	6–11, 11–5, 11–3	(gold) Winner
1994	Indonesia Open	(Indonesia) Susi Susanti	11–2, 0–11, 1–11	(silver) Runner-up
1994	Hong Kong Open	(Sweden) Lim Xiaoqing	11–7, 11–6	(gold) Winner
1994	China Open	(China) Ye Zhaoying	11–8, 11–8	(gold) Winner
1995	Korea Open	(Indonesia) Susi Susanti	11–3, 7–11, 9–11	(silver) Runner-up
1995	Japan Open	(Indonesia) Susi Susanti	7–11, 11–12	(silver) Runner-up
1995	Malaysia Open	(Indonesia) Susi Susanti	1–11, 6–11	(silver) Runner-up
1995	Indonesia Open	(Indonesia) Susi Susanti	6–11, 7–11	(silver) Runner-up
1995	Singapore Open	(Sweden) Lim Xiaoqing	7–11, 11–6, 8–11	(silver) Runner-up
1995	USA Open	(China) Ye Zhaoying	10–12, 11–3, 8–11	(silver) Runner-up
1995	Canada Open	(South Korea) Ra Kyung-min	11–0, 11–7	(gold) Winner
1995	Hong Kong Open	(Indonesia) Mia Audina	5–11, 11–4, 11–5	(gold) Winner
1996	All England Open	(China) Ye Zhaoying	11–1, 11–1	(gold) Winner
1996	Korea Open	(China) Yao Yan	11–3, 11–0	(gold) Winner

Women's doubles
Year	Tournament	Partner	Opponent	Score	Result
1994	China Open	(South Korea) Jang Hye-ock	(China) Ge Fei (China) Gu Jun	8–15, 2–15	(silver) Runner-up

=== IBF International ===
Women's singles
Year	Tournament	Opponent	Score	Result
1988	Welsh Open	(England) Julie Munday	5–11, 11–0, 11–8	(gold) Winner

== Record against selected opponents ==
Record against year-end Finals finalists, World Championships semi-finalists, and Olympic quarter-finalists.

Players	Matches	Results		Difference
Players	Matches	Won	Lost	Difference
(Australia) Anna Lao	1	1	0	+1
(China) Dai Yun	1	1	0	+1
(China) Han Aiping	2	0	2	–2
(China) Han Jingna	6	5	1	+4
(China) Huang Hua	6	3	3	0
(China) Tang Jiuhong	11	5	6	–1
(China) Wang Chen	1	1	0	+1
(China) Yao Yan	7	6	1	+5
(China) Ye Zhaoying	17	8	9	–1
(China) Zhang Ning	4	4	0	+4
(Chinese Taipei) Huang Chia-chi	3	3	0	+3

Players	Matches	Results		Difference
Players	Matches	Won	Lost	Difference
(Denmark) Camilla Martin	2	2	0	+2
(England) Helen Troke	1	1	0	+1
(Indonesia) Mia Audina	6	6	0	+6
(Indonesia) Sarwendah Kusumawardhani	6	4	2	+2
(Indonesia) Susi Susanti	25	6	19	–13
(Japan) Yasuko Mizui	4	4	0	+4
(South Korea) Kim Ji-hyun	5	5	0	+5
(South Korea) Lee Heung-soon	1	1	0	+1
(Sweden) Lim Xiaoqing	5	4	1	+3
(Thailand) Somharuthai Jaroensiri	2	2	0	+2
