= Marie-Josephe Jean-Pierre =

Mauritian badminton player (born 1975)

Personal information
- Nationality: Mauritian
- Born: 1 May 1975 (age 49)

Sport
- Sport: Badminton

Marie-Josephe Jean-Pierre (born 1 May 1975) is a Mauritian badminton player. She competed in three events at the 1996 Summer Olympics in Atlanta.
