= Chan Chia Fong =

Malaysian badminton player (born 1976)

Chan Chia Fong 曾家凤
Personal information
- Born: 24 December 1976 (age 49)

Sport
- Country: Malaysia
- Sport: Badminton
Medal record
Women's badminton
Representing Malaysia
Southeast Asian Games
Bronze medal – third place	1995 Chiang Mai	Women's team
World Junior Championships
Bronze medal – third place	1994 Kuala Lumpur	Girls' doubles

Chan Chia Fong (born 24 December 1976) is a Malaysian badminton player. Chan won a bronze medal in girls' doubles with Norhasikin Amin at 1994 World Junior Badminton Championships. She also competed in women's singles at the 1996 Summer Olympics in Atlanta.
