= Santi Wibowo =

Swiss badminton player

Personal information
- Nationality: Swiss
- Born: 15 November 1974 (age 50)

Sport
- Sport: Badminton

Santi Wibowo (born 15 November 1974) is a Swiss badminton player. She competed in women's singles and mixed doubles at the 1996 Summer Olympics in Atlanta.
