= Han Jingna =

Chinese badminton player

Han Jingna 韩晶娜
Personal information
- Born: 16 January 1975 (age 51) Qiaokou, Wuhan, Hubei, China
- Height: 1.75 m (5 ft 9 in)
- Weight: 62 kg (137 lb)

Sport
- Country: China
- Sport: Badminton
- Handedness: Right
- Event: Women's singles & doubles

Women's singles & doubles
- BWF profile
Medal record
Women's badminton
Representing China
World Championships
Silver medal – second place	1995 Lausanne	Women's singles
Bronze medal – third place	1997 Glasgow	Women's singles
Uber Cup
Gold medal – first place	1998 Hong Kong	Women's team
Silver medal – second place	1994 Jakarta	Women's team
Silver medal – second place	1996 Hong Kong	Women's team
Asian Games
Bronze medal – third place	1994 Hiroshima	Women's team
Asian Cup
Silver medal – second place	1994 Beijing	Women's singles
Bronze medal – third place	1995 Qingdao	Women's singles
World Junior Championships
Gold medal – first place	1992 Jakarta	Girls' doubles

Han Jingna (Chinese: 韩晶娜; born 16 January 1975) is a Chinese retired badminton player who rated among the world's leading women's singles players in the 1990s. Han began practicing badminton at the age of seven. Two years later, she trained at the sports school in Wuhan. She was selected to join the Hubei team in 1988 when she was thirteen, and to join the national team in 1989. She was part of national teams that clinched the 1995 Sudirman Cup in Lausanne, and the 1998 Uber Cup in Hong Kong, She won the silver medal for women's singles at the 1995 World Championships by upsetting South Korea's Bang Soo-hyun in the semifinals before falling to Chinese teammate Ye Zhaoying in the finals. Han also earned a singles bronze medal at the next World Championships in 1997. She competed in the women's singles competition at the 1996 Olympic Games but was eliminated in the quarterfinals round by the defending Olympic gold medalist Susi Susanti of Indonesia.

In 1999, she left the national team and went to the United Kingdom to help coach Great Britain's team for 2000 Olympic Games. She later worked as a Chinese national youth team coach starting in 2006.

== Achievements ==
=== World Championships ===
Women's singles
Year	Venue	Opponent	Score	Result
1995	Malley Sports Centre; Lausanne, Switzerland	(China) Ye Zhaoying	7–11, 0–11	Silver
1997	Scotstoun Centre; Glasgow, Scotland	(China) Gong Zhichao	9–12, 9–11	Bronze

=== Asian Cup ===
Women's singles
Year	Venue	Opponent	Score	Result
1994	Beijing Gymnasium; Beijing, China	(China) Ye Zhaoying	6–11, 12–9, 3–11	Silver
1995	Xinxing Gymnasium; Qingdao, China	(South Korea) Bang Soo-hyun	1–11, 3–11	Bronze

=== World Junior Championships ===
Girls' doubles
Year	Venue	Partner	Opponent	Score	Result
1992	Istora Senayan; Jakarta, Indonesia	(China) Gu Jun	(China) Tang Yongshu (China) Yuan Yali	15–9, 15–5	Gold

=== IBF World Grand Prix ===
The World Badminton Grand Prix sanctioned by International Badminton Federation (IBF) from 1983 to 2006.

Women's singles
Year	Tournament	Opponent	Score	Result
1992	Singapore Open	(China) Ye Zhaoying	11–8, 2–11, 3–11	(silver) Runner-up
1993	China Open	(China) Ye Zhaoying	12–10, 11–1	(gold) Winner
1993	Hong Kong Open	(China) Ye Zhaoying	12–10, 7–11, 1–11	(silver) Runner-up
1995	Sydney Open	(Indonesia) Silvia Anggraini	11–5, 11–1	(gold) Winner
1996	Dutch Open	(China) Yao Yan	2–9, 2–9, 0–9	(silver) Runner-up
1996	Russian Open	(China) Gong Zhichao	11–7, 11–5	(gold) Winner

Women's doubles
Year	Tournament	Partner	Opponent	Score	Result
1993	Thailand Open	(China) Li Qi	(China) Ge Fei (China) Gu Jun	5–15, 10–15	(silver) Runner-up
1995	Swedish Open	(China) Ye Zhaoying	(South Korea) Kim Mee-hyang (South Korea) Kim Shin-young	15–12, 12–15, 8–15	(silver) Runner-up
1997	Swiss Open	(China) Ye Zhaoying	(China) Ge Fei (China) Gu Jun	15–9, 2–15, 11–15	(silver) Runner-up

=== IBF International ===
Women's singles
Year	Tournament	Opponent	Score	Result
1999	Italian International	(China) Zeng Yaqiong	Walkover	(silver) Runner-up

Mixed doubles
Year	Tournament	Partner	Opponent	Score	Result
1999	Italian International	(England) Ian Sullivan	(England) Anthony Clark (China) Zeng Yaqiong	15–11, 15–7	(gold) Winner
