= Song Yang (badminton) =

Australia badminton player

Personal information
- Country: Australia
- Born: 12 May 1965 (age 60); Nanjing, China
- Handedness: Right
Medal record
Women's badminton
Representing Australia
Commonwealth Games
Bronze medal – third place	1994 Victoria	Women's singles
Bronze medal – third place	1994 Victoria	Mixed team
- BWF profile

Song Yang (born 12 May 1965) is an Australian badminton player, born in Nanjing, China. She competed in women's singles at the 1996 Summer Olympics in Atlanta.
