= Hisako Mizui =

Japanese badminton player (born 1972)

Personal information
- Born: 29 March 1972 (age 54) Nara, Nara, Japan
- Height: 1.65 m (5 ft 5 in)
- Weight: 55 kg (121 lb)

Sport
- Country: Japan
- Sport: Badminton
- Handedness: Right
- Event: Women's singles

Women's singles
- BWF profile
Medal record
Women's badminton
Representing Japan
Uber Cup
Bronze medal – third place	1990 Nagoya & Tokyo	Women's team
Asian Games
Silver medal – second place	1994 Hiroshima	Women's singles
Bronze medal – third place	1990 Beijing	Women's team
Bronze medal – third place	1994 Hiroshima	Women's team
Asian Championships
Bronze medal – third place	1996 Surabaya	Women's doubles
East Asian Games
Bronze medal – third place	1993 Shanghai	Women's doubles
Bronze medal – third place	1993 Shanghai	Women's team

Hisako Mizui (水井 妃佐子, Mizui Hisako; born 29 March 1972) is a Japanese badminton player, born in Nara, Nara.

She competed in women's singles and women's doubles at the 1992 Summer Olympics, and in women's singles at the 1996 Summer Olympics in Atlanta. She won a silver medal in women's singles at the 1994 Asian Games.

She is a sister of badminton player Yasuko Mizui.

== Achievements ==
=== Asian Games ===
Women's singles

Year	Venue	Opponent	Score	Result
1994	Tsuru Memorial Gymnasium, Hiroshima, Japan	(South Korea) Bang Soo-hyun	4–11, 6–11	Silver

=== Asian Championships ===
Women's doubles

Year	Venue	Partner	Opponent	Score	Result
1996	GOR Pancasila, Surabaya, Indonesia	(Japan) Yasuko Mizui	(Indonesia) Indarti Issolina (Indonesia) Deyana Lomban	9–15, 9–15	Bronze

=== East Asian Games ===
Women’s doubles

Year	Venue	Partner	Opponent	Score	Result
1993	Shanghai, China	(Japan) Aiko Miyamura	(South Korea) Kim Shin-young (South Korea) Shon Hye-joo	18–13, 7–15, 5–15	Bronze

=== IBF World Grand Prix ===
The World Badminton Grand Prix sanctioned by International Badminton Federation (IBF) since 1983.

Women's singles

Year	Tournament	Opponent	Score	Result
1992	Canada Open	(Canada) Denyse Julien	11–5, 7–11, 12–10	(gold) Winner

=== IBF Junior Tournament ===
Girls' singles

Year	Tournament	Opponent	Score	Result
1988	German Juniors	(Japan) Aiko Miyamura	3–11, 4–11	(silver) Runner-up

Girls' doubles

Year	Tournament	Partner	Opponent	Score	Result
1988	German Juniors	(Japan) Aiko Miyamura	(Japan) Kaiko Nakahara (Japan) Miwa Kai	15–7, 7–15, 15–7	(gold) Winner
