= Esther Sanz =

Spanish badminton player (born 1974)

Personal information
- Full name: Esther María Sanz Barranco
- Nationality: Spanish
- Born: 6 December 1974 (age 50); Málaga, Spain

Sport
- Sport: Badminton

Esther María Sanz Barranco (Note: In this Spanish name, the first or paternal surname is Sanz and the second or maternal family name is Barranco.) (born 6 December 1974) is a Spanish badminton player, born in Málaga. She competed in women's singles at the 1992 Summer Olympics in Barcelona.
