= Sandra Dimbour =

French badminton player

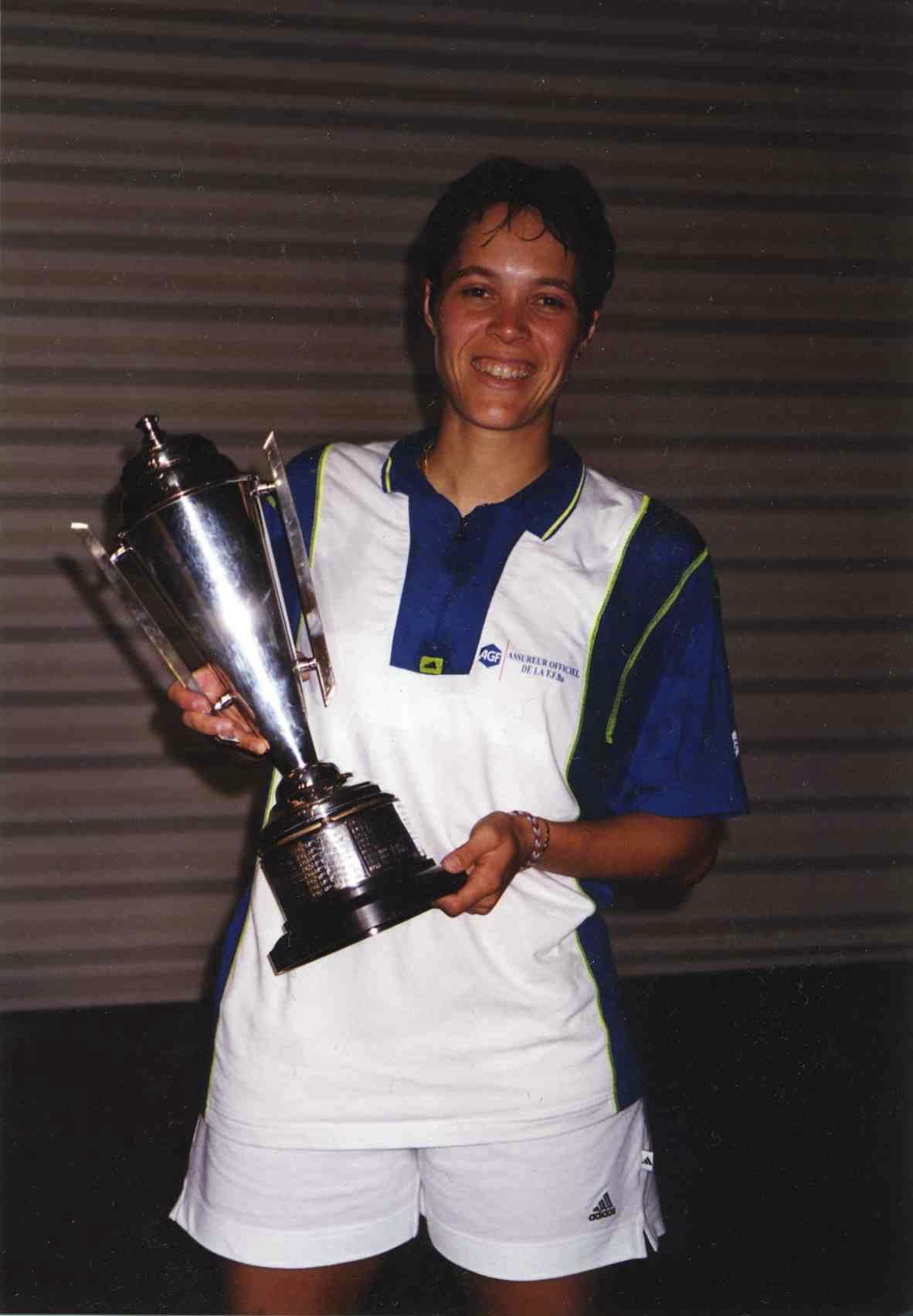
- Dimbour won the 1999 Australian International

Personal information
- Born: 13 June 1970 (age 56) Saint-Denis, Seine-Saint-Denis, France
- Height: 1.72 m (5 ft 8 in)
- Weight: 68 kg (150 lb)

Sport
- Country: France
- Sport: Badminton
- Handedness: Right
- Event: Women's singles & doubles

Women's singles & doubles
- BWF profile

Sandra Dimbour (born 13 June 1970) is a French badminton player from Racing Club de France, Paris. Join the INSEP in 1989, Dimbour competed in three consecutive Summer Olympics in 1992, 1996, and 2000. She had won 15 times National Championships, 8 in the singles, 5 in the women's doubles, and 2 in the mixed doubles event. After retirement from the international tournament, she started a career as a badminton coach. Dimbour was a member of the French National Olympic and Sports Committee from 2002 to 2009.

== Achievements ==
=== IBF International ===
Women's singles
Year	Tournament	Opponent	Score	Result
1988	Spanish International	(France) Christelle Mol	6–11, 11–8, 11–0	(gold) Winner
1993	Strasbourg International			(gold) Winner
1994	Mauritius International	(England) Tanya Woodward	11–6, 6–11, 11–5	(gold) Winner
1994	Slovenian International	(Austria) Irina Serova	9–11, 8–11	(silver) Runner-up
1996	Slovenian International	(Slovenia) Maja Pohar	11–5, 12–9	(gold) Winner
1996	Le Volant d'Or de Toulouse	(England) Tracey Hallam	11–12, 12–11, 12–11	(gold) Winner
1996	Spanish International	(Denmark) Tanja Berg	11–8, 2–11, 10–12	(silver) Runner-up
1998	Czech International	(Russia) Ella Karachkova	9–11, 7–11	(silver) Runner-up
1998	Spanish International	(Canada) Julia Chen	8–11, 8–11	(silver) Runner-up
1999	Australian International	(Netherlands) Brenda Beenhakker	11–3, 11–5	(gold) Winner
1999	Slovenian International	(Slovenia) Maja Pohar	8–11, 6–11	(silver) Runner-up
1999	Spanish International	(Japan) Takako Ida	2–11, 0–11	(silver) Runner-up

Women's doubles
Year	Tournament	Partner	Opponent	Score	Result
1996	Spanish International	(France) Sandrine Lefèvre	(Spain) Dolores Marco (Spain) Esther Sanz	17–15, 15–9	(gold) Winner
