= Zarinah Abdullah =

Singaporean badminton player (born 1971)

Personal information
- Born: 12 July 1971 (age 54) Singapore
- Height: 1.62 m (5 ft 4 in)

Sport
- Country: Singapore
- Sport: Badminton
- Handedness: Right

Women's singles
- Highest ranking: 7 (19 July 1993)
- BWF profile
Medal record
Women's badminton
Representing Singapore
Southeast Asian Games
Bronze medal – third place	1989 Kuala Lumpur	Women's team
Bronze medal – third place	1993 Singapore	Women's singles
Bronze medal – third place	1995 Chiang Mai	Women's team

Zarinah Abdullah (born 12 July 1971) is a retired badminton player notable for being the first female professional badminton player in Singapore. She was considered Singapore's top badminton player in the 1990s and represented the country in the 1992 and 1996 Summer Olympics.

== Career ==
Zarinah started playing badminton at the age of 12. While studying at Outram Institute, she competed in the national championships. As of February 1990, she was Singapore's national women's champion for two years. She subsequently quit her pre-university studies to become a full-time badminton player.

Zarinah participated in the 1992 and 1996 Summer Olympics in the women's singles event. She achieved her highest world ranking of seven in July 1993 and her highest World Grand Prix ranking of three in January 1994.

== Awards ==
Zarinah received the 1993 and 1994 Meritorious Award from the Singapore National Olympic Committee.

== Achievements ==
=== Southeast Asian Games ===
Women's singles

Year	Venue	Opponent	Score	Result
1993	Singapore Badminton Hall, Singapore	(Indonesia) Yuliani Santosa	2–11, 3–11	Bronze

=== IBF International ===
Women's singles

Year	Tournament	Opponent	Score	Result
1993	Brunei Open	(Indonesia) Silvia Anggraeni	11–5, 10–12, 8–11	(silver) Runner-up
1995	New Zealand International	(Australia) Song Yang	4–11, 11–8, 5–11	(silver) Runner-up
1997	Malaysia International	(Indonesia) Ellen Angelina	9–11, 7–11	(silver) Runner-up
