= Yao Yan (badminton) =

Chinese badminton player

Yao Yan 姚燕
Personal information
- Born: 9 December 1974 (age 51) Nanning, Guangxi, China
- Height: 1.70 m (5 ft 7 in)
- Weight: 65 kg (143 lb)

Sport
- Country: China
- Sport: Badminton
- Event: Women's singles

Women's singles
- BWF profile
Medal record
Women's badminton
Representing China
Asian Games
Bronze medal – third place	1994 Hiroshima	Women's team
Asian Championships
Gold medal – first place	1997 Kuala Lumpur	Women's singles
Silver medal – second place	1995 Beijing	Women's singles
World Junior Championships
Silver medal – second place	1992 Jakarta	Girls' singles

Yao Yan (Chinese: 姚燕; born 9 December 1974) is a retired Chinese badminton player from Nanning, Guangxi. She competed at the 1996 Summer Olympics.

== Achievements ==
=== Asian Championships ===
Women's singles
Year	Venue	Opponent	Score	Result
1997	Kuala Lumpur, Malaysia	(China) Yu Hua	2–11, 11–9, 11–5	Gold
1995	Beijing, China	(China) Ye Zhaoying	11–5, 7–11, 3–11	Silver

=== World Junior Championships ===
Girls' singles
Year	Venue	Opponent	Score	Result
1992	Istora Senayan; Jakarta, Indonesia	(Indonesia) Kristin Yunita	11–12, 1–11	Silver

=== IBF World Grand Prix ===
The World Badminton Grand Prix sanctioned by International Badminton Federation (IBF) since 1983.

Women's singles
Year	Tournament	Opponent	Score	Result
1996	Dutch Open	(China) Han Jingna	9–2, 9–2, 9–0	(gold) Winner
1996	Korea Open	(South Korea) Bang Soo-hyun	3–11, 0–11	(silver) Runner-up
1993	French Open	(China) Ye Zhaoying	11–7, 5–11, 11–5	(gold) Winner
1992	China Open	(China) Shen Lianfeng	11–7, 11–8	(gold) Winner
