= Kim Ji-hyun (badminton) =

South Korean badminton player

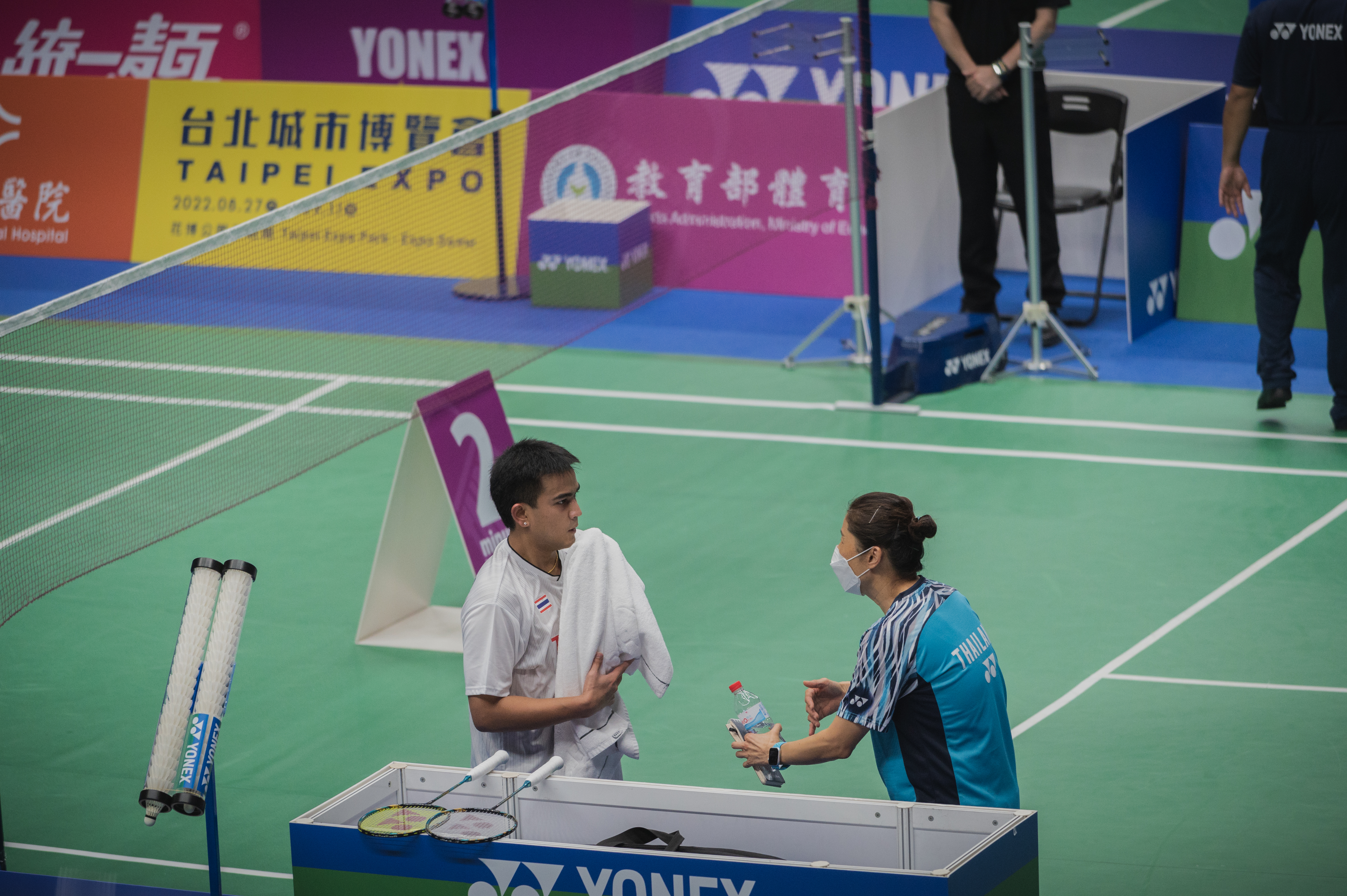

Personal information
- Born: 김지현; 10 September 1974 (age 52) Busan, South Korea
- Height: 1.69 m (5 ft 7 in)
- Weight: 60 kg (132 lb)

Sport
- Country: South Korea
- Sport: Badminton
- Handedness: Right
- Event: Women's singles & doubles

Women's singles & doubles
- BWF profile
Medal record
Women's badminton
Representing South Korea
Sudirman Cup
| Silver medal – second place | 1997 Glasgow | Mixed team |
| Bronze medal – third place | 1999 Copenhagen | Mixed team |
| Bronze medal – third place | 1995 Lausanne | Mixed team |
Uber Cup
| Bronze medal – third place | 2000 Kuala Lumpur | Women's team |
| Bronze medal – third place | 1998 Hong Kong | Women's team |
| Bronze medal – third place | 1996 Hong Kong | Women's team |
| Bronze medal – third place | 1994 Jakarta | Women's team |
Asian Games
| Gold medal – first place | 1994 Hiroshima | Women's team |
| Silver medal – second place | 1998 Bangkok | Women's team |
Asian Championships
| Bronze medal – third place | 1994 Shanghai | Women's singles |
Asian Cup
| Bronze medal – third place | 1994 Beijing | Women's singles |
East Asian Games
| Bronze medal – third place | 1993 Shanghai | Women's singles |

Kim Ji-hyun (Korean: 김지현; Hanja: 金志炫; born 10 September 1974), also known as Jihyun Marr, is South Korean former badminton player. She participated at the 1996 and 2000 Summer Olympics in the women's singles event. Kim who affiliated with the Samsung Electro-Mechanics team, won the women's singles title at the National Championships tournament in 1997 and 1998. She announced her retirement from the international tournament after the 2001 Korea Open.

She was a former coach at the BWF training academy in Saarbrucken, later joined the New Zealand, Korean, and Indian national team. Earlier in 2019, she helped India get its first gold in BWF World Championships in Basel where P. V. Sindhu became India's first badminton player to become World Champion. She worked as a coach for Indian national team until September 2019 when she resigned to take care of her ailing husband. In november 2020 she was appointed as one of the five new coaches by the Badminton Korea Association (BKA) responsible for the women's singles till 31 October 2022.

Kim left BKA to join the Badminton Association of Thailand (BAT) in March 2022 as part of the BAT effort to strengthen the coaching team in preparation for the 2024 Paris Olympic Games. She successfully coached Thailand's Supanida Katethong to break into the top 10 in women's singles by capturing the 2024 Thailand Open title, a BWF World Tour 500 event. Kim left BAT to become Singapore women’s singles badminton coach on 1 January 2025. Kim is subsequently appointed with an expanded role of guiding the men’s players as well, becoming the Singles Head Coach for Singapore's badminton team.

== Achievements ==
=== Asian Championships ===
Women's singles
| Year | Venue | Opponent | Score | Result |
|---|---|---|---|---|
| 1994 | Shanghai Gymnasium; Shanghai, China | (China) Liu Yuhong | 12–11, 7–11, 5–11 | Bronze |

=== Asian Cup ===
Women's singles
| Year | Venue | Opponent | Score | Result |
|---|---|---|---|---|
| 1994 | Beijing Gymnasium; Beijing, China | (China) Han Jingna | 5–11, 8–11 | Bronze |

=== East Asian Games ===
Women's singles
| Year | Venue | Opponent | Score | Result |
|---|---|---|---|---|
| 1993 | Shanghai, China | (China) Lin Xiaoming | 11–8, 11–12, 1–11 | Bronze |

=== World Junior Championships ===
The Bimantara World Junior Championships was an international invitation badminton tournament for junior players. It was held in Jakarta, Indonesia from 1987 to 1991.

Girls' singles
| Year | Venue | Opponent | Score | Result |
|---|---|---|---|---|
| 1989 | Jakarta, Indonesia | (Denmark) Camilla Martin | 11–5, 11–7 | Gold |

=== IBF World Grand Prix ===
The World Badminton Grand Prix was sanctioned by the International Badminton Federation from 1983 to 2006.

Women's singles
| Year | Tournament | Opponent | Score | Result |
|---|---|---|---|---|
| 1994 | Chinese Taipei Open | (Indonesia) Susi Susanti | 2–11, 5–11 | (silver) Runner-up |
| 1994 | Korea Open | (South Korea) Bang Soo-hyun | 5–11, 5–11 | (silver) Runner-up |
| 1994 | Swedish Open | (South Korea) Bang Soo-hyun | 11–6, 5–11, 3–11 | (silver) Runner-up |
| 1996 | Thailand Open | (China) Wang Chen | 11–2, 5–11, 7–11 | (silver) Runner-up |
| 1998 | Swedish Open | (China) Gong Zhichao | 12–10, 11–8 | (gold) Winner |
| 1999 | Swedish Open | (China) Gong Ruina | 8–11, 5–11 | (silver) Runner-up |
| 2001 | Korea Open | (Denmark) Camilla Martin | 7–11, 11–8, 10–13 | (silver) Runner-up |

=== IBF International ===
Women's singles
| Year | Tournament | Opponent | Score | Result |
|---|---|---|---|---|
| 1991 | USSR International | (Soviet Union) Elena Rybkina | 5–15, 7–15 | (silver) Runner-up |
| 1999 | Hungarian International | (South Korea) Lee Soon-deuk | 11–6, 11–1 | (gold) Winner |
| 1999 | Norwegian International | (China) Wang Chen | 2–11, 11–3, 11–6 | (gold) Winner |
| 2002 | New Zealand International | (Australia) Lenny Permana | 7–2, 7–1, 7–1 | (gold) Winner |

Women's doubles
| Year | Tournament | Partner | Opponent | Score | Result |
|---|---|---|---|---|---|
| 1991 | USSR International | (South Korea) Kang Bok-seung | (Soviet Union) Natalja Ivanova (Soviet Union) Julia Martynenko | 10–15, 18–17, 12–15 | (silver) Runner-up |
