= Yasuko Mizui =

Japanese badminton player

Personal information
- Born: 19 September 1975 (age 50) Nara Prefecture, Japan
- Height: 1.69 m (5 ft 7 in)
- Weight: 58 kg (128 lb)

Sport
- Country: Japan
- Sport: Badminton
- Handedness: Right
- Event: Women's singles & doubles

Women's singles & doubles
- BWF profile
Medal record
Women's badminton
Representing Japan
Asian Games
Bronze medal – third place	1998 Bangkok	Women's team
Bronze medal – third place	1994 Hiroshima	Women's team
Asian Championships
Bronze medal – third place	1996 Surabaya	Women's doubles

Yasuko Mizui (水井 泰子, Mizui Yasuko; born 19 September 1975) is a former Japanese badminton player who affiliated with NTT Tokyo. She graduated from Shiritsushijonawategakuenko School, and then she joined the Fujitsu team. Mizui competed at the 1996 and 2000 Summer Olympics in the women's singles event. She was part of the Japanese team that won the bronze medals at the 1994 and 1998 Asian Games in the women's team event. Mizui won the women's doubles bronze at the 1996 Asian Championships, and also clinched the women's singles title at the 53 National Championships in 1999. She retired from the international tournament after the 2000 Olympics.

Her sister Hisako Mizui also a badminton Olympian who competed in 1992 and 1996.

== Achievements ==
=== Asian Championships ===
Women's doubles

Year	Venue	Partner	Opponent	Score	Result
1996	Surabaya, Indonesia	(Japan) Hisako Mizui	(Indonesia) Indarti Issolina (Indonesia) Deyana Lomban	9–15, 9–15	Bronze

=== IBF World Grand Prix ===
The World Badminton Grand Prix sanctioned by International Badminton Federation (IBF) since 1983.

Women's singles

Year	Tournament	Opponent	Score	Result
1999	Swiss Open	(Indonesia) Cindana Hartono Kusuma	11–7, 6–11, 10–13	(silver) Runner-up
