= 1992 Uber Cup qualification =

Tournament details
- Dates: 16 – 24 February 1992
- Location: Asian zone: Hong Kong; European zone: 's-Hertogenbosch

The qualifying process for the 1992 Uber Cup took place from 16 to 24 February 1992 to decide the final teams which will play in the final tournament.

== Qualification process ==
The qualification process was divided into two regions, the Asian Zone and the European Zone. Seeded teams received a bye into the second round while unseeded teams competed in the first round for a place in the second round. The first two rounds were played in a round-robin format. Teams in the second round competed for a place in the knockout stages. Semi-final winners in each zone were guaranteed qualification for the final tournament to be held in Kuala Lumpur while the remaining teams competed in a third place playoff match for a place in the final tournament.

China qualified for the final tournament as defending champions while Malaysia qualified as hosts.

=== Qualified teams ===
| Country | Qualified as | Qualified on | Final appearance |
|---|---|---|---|
| Malaysia | 1992 Uber Cup hosts | 22 October 1990 | 5th |
| China | 1990 Uber Cup winners | 2 June 1990 | 5th |
| Indonesia | Asian Zone winners | 24 February 1992 | 12th |
| South Korea | Asian Zone runners-up | 24 February 1992 | 5th |
| Japan | Third place in Asian Zone | 24 February 1992 | 10th |
| Sweden | European Zone winners | 24 February 1992 | 3rd |
| Netherlands | European Zone runners-up | 24 February 1992 | 3rd |
| England | Third place in European Zone | 24 February 1992 | 10th |

== Asian Zone ==
The qualification rounds for the Asian Zone were held from 16 to 24 February at Queen Elizabeth Stadium in Hong Kong. Thirteen teams took part in qualifying for the final tournament, with Tanzania and the Philippines making their debut in the tournament. Nepal withdrew from the tournament.

=== First round ===
==== Group A ====
| Pos | Team | Pld | W | L | MF | MA | MD | Pts | Qualification |
|---|---|---|---|---|---|---|---|---|---|
| 1 | Hong Kong | 3 | 3 | 0 | 14 | 1 | +13 | 3 | Advance to second round |
| 2 | New Zealand | 3 | 2 | 1 | 11 | 4 | +7 | 2 | |
| 3 | Philippines | 3 | 1 | 2 | 5 | 10 | −5 | 1 | |
| 4 | Tanzania | 3 | 0 | 3 | 0 | 15 | −15 | 0 | |

Source: intbadfed.org

New Zealand
5
Queen Elizabeth Stadium
16 February 1992

Tanzania
0

| | | Result |
|---|---|---|---|
| 1 | Julie Still | 2 – 0 (11–1, 11–1) | Shweta Rajani |
| 2 | Rhona Robertson | 2 – 0 (11–1, 11–0) | Nasra Juma |
| 3 | Sheree Jefferson | 2 – 0 (11–2, 11–1) | Sheetal Rajani |
| 4 | Rhona Robertson; Tammy Jenkins | 2 – 0 (15–0, 15–1) | Jisma Babia; Nasra Juma |
| 5 | Sheree Jefferson; Julie Still | 2 – 0 (15–0, 15–1) | Sheetal Rajani; Shweta Rajani |

Hong Kong
5
Queen Elizabeth Stadium
16 February 1992

Philippines
0

| | | Result |
|---|---|---|---|
| 1 | Wong Chun Fan | 2 – 0 | Maria Elena Garcia |
| 2 | Chan Oi Ni | 2 – 0 | Jeanette Villanueva |
| 3 | Cheng Yin Sat | 2 – 0 | Maria Celina Garcia |
| 4 | Ngan Fai; Tung Chau Man | 2 – 0 | Maria Elena Garcia; Racquel Roxas |
| 5 | Chiu Mei Yin; Ma Wing Sze | 2 – 0 | Maria Celina Garcia; Jeanette Villanueva |

New Zealand
5
Queen Elizabeth Stadium
17 February 1992

Philippines
0

| | | Result |
|---|---|---|---|
| 1 | Julie Still | 2 – 0 | Maria Elena Garcia |
| 2 | Rhona Robertson | 2 – 0 | Jeanette Villanueva |
| 3 | Sheree Jefferson | 2 – 0 | Maria Celina Garcia |
| 4 | Rhona Robertson; Tammy Jenkins | 2 – 0 | Maria Elena Garcia; Racquel Roxas |
| 5 | Sheree Jefferson; Julie Still | 2 – 0 | Maria Celina Garcia; Jeanette Villanueva |

Hong Kong
5
Queen Elizabeth Stadium
17 February 1992

Tanzania
0

| | | Result |
|---|---|---|---|
| 1 | Wong Chun Fan | 2 – 0 | Shweta Rajani |
| 2 | Chan Oi Ni | 2 – 0 | Nasra Juma |
| 3 | Cheng Yin Sat | 2 – 0 | Sheetal Rajani |
| 4 | Ngan Fai; Tung Chau Man | 2 – 0 | Jisma Babia; Nasra Juma |
| 5 | Chiu Mei Yin; Ma Wing Sze | 2 – 0 | Sheetal Rajani; Shweta Rajani |

New Zealand
1
Queen Elizabeth Stadium
18 February 1992

Hong Kong
4

| | | Result |
|---|---|---|---|
| 1 | Julie Still | 0 – 2 | Wong Chun Fan |
| 2 | Rhona Robertson | 2 – 1 | Chan Oi Ni |
| 3 | Tammy Jenkins | 0 – 2 | Cheng Yin Sat |
| 4 | Rhona Robertson; Tammy Jenkins | 0 – 2 | Ngan Fai; Tung Chau Man |
| 5 | Sheree Jefferson; Julie Still | 2 – 0 | Chiu Mei Yin; Ma Wing Sze |

Philippines
5
Queen Elizabeth Stadium
18 February 1992

Tanzania
0

| | | Result |
|---|---|---|---|
| 1 | Maria Elena Garcia | 2 – 0 | Shweta Rajani |
| 2 | Jeanette Villanueva | 2 – 0 | Nasra Juma |
| 3 | Maria Celina Garcia | 2 – 0 | Sheetal Rajani |
| 4 | Maria Elena Garcia; Racquel Roxas | 2 – 0 | Jisma Babia; Nasra Juma |
| 5 | Maria Celina Garcia; Jeanette Villanueva | 2 – 0 | Sheetal Rajani; Shweta Rajani |

==== Group B ====
| Pos | Team | Pld | W | L | MF | MA | MD | Pts | Qualification |
|---|---|---|---|---|---|---|---|---|---|
| 1 | India | 2 | 2 | 0 | 10 | 0 | +10 | 2 | Advance to second round |
| 2 | Sri Lanka | 2 | 1 | 1 | 5 | 5 | 0 | 1 | |
| 3 | Macau | 2 | 0 | 2 | 0 | 10 | −10 | 0 | |
| 4 | Nepal | 0 | 0 | 0 | 0 | 0 | 0 | 0 | Withdrew |

Source: intbadfed.org

India
5
Queen Elizabeth Stadium
16 February 1992

Macau
0

| | | Result |
|---|---|---|---|
| 1 | Madhumita Bisht | 2 – 0 | Io Chao Leng |
| 2 | Manjusha Pavangadkar | 2 – 0 | Choi Sok Cheng |
| 3 | Nancy Keith | 2 – 0 | Kong Wai Kuan |
| 4 | Archana Deodhar; Manjusha Pavangadkar | 2 – 0 | Kong Wai Kuan; Yeung Sai Ip |
| 5 | Seema Bhandari; Sudha Padmanabhan | 2 – 0 | Choi Sok Cheng; Io Chao Leng |

Sri Lanka
5
Queen Elizabeth Stadium
17 February 1992

Macau
0

| | | Result |
|---|---|---|---|
| 1 | Sriyani Deepika | 2 – 0 | Io Chao Leng |
| 2 | Yasintha Liyanage | 2 – 0 | Choi Sok Cheng |
| 3 | Kaushalya Dissanayake | 2 – 0 | Kong Wai Kuan |
| 4 | Sriyani Deepika; Nilusha Seneviratne | 2 – 0 | Kong Wai Kuan; Yeung Sai Ip |
| 5 | Kaushalya Dissanayake; Yasintha Liyanage | 2 – 0 | Choi Sok Cheng; Io Chao Leng |

India
5
Queen Elizabeth Stadium
18 February 1992

Sri Lanka
0

| | | Result |
|---|---|---|---|
| 1 | Madhumita Bisht | 2 – 0 | Sriyani Deepika |
| 2 | Manjusha Pavangadkar | 2 – 0 | Yasintha Liyanage |
| 3 | Nancy Keith | 2 – 0 | Kaushalya Dissanayake |
| 4 | Archana Deodhar; Manjusha Pavangadkar | 2 – 0 | Sriyani Deepika; Nilusha Seneviratne |
| 5 | Seema Bhandari; Sudha Padmanabhan | 2 – 0 | Kaushalya Dissanayake; Yasintha Liyanage |

=== Second round ===
==== Group X ====
| Pos | Team | Pld | W | L | MF | MA | MD | Pts | Qualification |
|---|---|---|---|---|---|---|---|---|---|
| 1 | Indonesia | 3 | 3 | 0 | 14 | 1 | +13 | 3 | Advance to knockout stage |
| 2 | Japan | 3 | 2 | 1 | 11 | 4 | +7 | 2 | Advance to knockout stage |
| 3 | Hong Kong | 3 | 1 | 2 | 3 | 12 | −9 | 1 | |
| 4 | Chinese Taipei | 3 | 0 | 3 | 2 | 14 | −12 | 0 | |

Source: intbadfed.org

Indonesia
5
Queen Elizabeth Stadium
19 February 1992

Chinese Taipei
0

| | | Result |
|---|---|---|---|
| 1 | Susi Susanti | 2 – 0 (11–1, 11–1) | Hsu Yu-ling |
| 2 | Sarwendah Kusumawardhani | 2 – 0 (11–4, 11–3) | Feng Mei-ying |
| 3 | Yuliani Santosa | 2 – 0 (11–3, 11–1) | Chen Mei-chun |
| 4 | Erma Sulistianingsih; Rosiana Tendean | 2 – 0 (15–10, 15–3) | Kang Chia-i; Lee Chien-mei |
| 5 | Finarsih; Eliza Nathanael | 2 – 1 (15–9, 10–15, 15–2) | Chen Mei-chun; Lin Hui-hsu |

Japan
5
Queen Elizabeth Stadium
19 February 1992

Hong Kong
0

| | | Result |
|---|---|---|---|
| 1 | Hisako Mizui | 2 – 0 (11–6, 11–8) | Wong Chun Fan |
| 2 | Aiko Miyamura | 2 – 0 (11–0, 11–6) | Chan Oi Ni |
| 3 | Harumi Kohara | 2 – 1 (11–6, 6–11, 11–7) | Cheng Yin Sat |
| 4 | Kimiko Jinnai; Hisako Mori | 2 – 0 (15–7, 15–3) | Ngan Fai; Tung Chau Man |
| 5 | Tomomi Matsuo; Kyoko Sasage | 2 – 0 (15–0, 15–10) | Chiu Mei Yin; Ma Wing Sze |

Indonesia
5
Queen Elizabeth Stadium
20 February 1992

Hong Kong
0

| | | Result |
|---|---|---|---|
| 1 | Sarwendah Kusumawardhani | 2 – 0 | Wong Chun Fan |
| 2 | Yuliani Santosa | 2 – 0 | Chan Oi Ni |
| 3 | Yuni Kartika | 2 – 0 | Cheng Yin Sat |
| 4 | Finarsih; Lili Tampi | 2 – 0 | Ngan Fai; Tung Chau Man |
| 5 | Eliza Nathanael; Erma Sulistianingsih | 2 – 0 | Chiu Mei Yin; Ma Wing Sze |

Japan
5
Queen Elizabeth Stadium
20 February 1992

Chinese Taipei
0

| | | Result |
|---|---|---|---|
| 1 | Hisako Mizui | 2 – 0 | Hsu Yu-ling |
| 2 | Aiko Miyamura | 2 – 0 | Feng Mei-ying |
| 3 | Harumi Kohara | 2 – 0 | Chen Mei-chun |
| 4 | Kimiko Jinnai; Hisako Mori | 2 – 1 | Kang Chia-i; Lee Chien-mei |
| 5 | Tomomi Matsuo; Kyoko Sasage | 2 – 1 | Chen Mei-chun; Lin Hui-hsu |

Indonesia
5
Queen Elizabeth Stadium
21 February 1992

Japan
0

| | | Result |
|---|---|---|---|
| 1 | Susi Susanti | 2 – 0 | Hisako Mizui |
| 2 | Sarwendah Kusumawardhani | 2 – 0 | Aiko Miyamura |
| 3 | Yuliani Santosa | 2 – 0 | Harumi Kohara |
| 4 | Finarsih; Lili Tampi | 2 – 0 | Kimiko Jinnai; Hisako Mori |
| 5 | Eliza Nathanael; Erma Sulistianingsih | 2 – 0 | Tomomi Matsuo; Kyoko Sasage |

Chinese Taipei
2
Queen Elizabeth Stadium
21 February 1992

Hong Kong
3

| | | Result |
|---|---|---|---|
| 1 | Hsu Yu-ling | 1 – 2 | Wong Chun Fan |
| 2 | Feng Mei-ying | 2 – 1 | Chan Oi Ni |
| 3 | Chen Mei-chun | 0 – 2 | Cheng Yin Sat |
| 4 | Kang Chia-i; Lee Chien-mei | 2 – 0 | Ngan Fai; Tung Chau Man |
| 5 | Chen Mei-chun; Lin Hui-hsu | 1 – 2 | Chiu Mei Yin; Ma Wing Sze |

==== Group Y ====
| Pos | Team | Pld | W | L | MF | MA | MD | Pts | Qualification |
|---|---|---|---|---|---|---|---|---|---|
| 1 | South Korea | 3 | 3 | 0 | 15 | 0 | +15 | 3 | Advance to knockout stage |
| 2 | Thailand | 3 | 2 | 1 | 6 | 9 | −3 | 2 | Advance to knockout stage |
| 3 | Australia | 3 | 1 | 2 | 7 | 8 | −1 | 1 | |
| 4 | India | 3 | 0 | 3 | 2 | 13 | −11 | 0 | |

Source: intbadfed.org

South Korea
5
Queen Elizabeth Stadium
19 February 1992

India
0

| | | Result |
|---|---|---|---|
| 1 | Bang Soo-hyun | 2 – 0 (11–1, 11–2) | Madhumita Bisht |
| 2 | Lee Heung-soon | 2 – 0 (11–2, 5–11, 11–2) | Manjusha Pavangadkar |
| 3 | Park Jin-hyun | 2 – 0 (11–5, 11–4) | Nancy Keith |
| 4 | Chung Myung-hee; Hwang Hye-young | 2 – 0 (15–1, 15–3) | Archana Deodhar; Manjusha Pavangadkar |
| 5 | Gil Young-ah; Shim Eun-jung | 2 – 0 (15–2, 15–1) | Seema Bhandari; Sudha Padmanabhan |

Thailand
3
Queen Elizabeth Stadium
19 February 1992

Australia
2

| | | Result |
|---|---|---|---|
| 1 | Somharuthai Jaroensiri | 1 – 2 (12–9, 3–11, 10–12) | Anna Lao |
| 2 | Plernta Boonyarit | 0 – 2 (10–12, 1–11) | Rhonda Cator |
| 3 | Pornsawan Plungwech | 2 – 0 (11–7, 11–3) | Lisa Bryant |
| 4 | Ladawan Mulasartsatorn; Piyathip Sansaniyakulvilai | 2 – 0 (15–0, 15–12) | Rhonda Cator; Anna Lao |
| 5 | Plernta Boonyarit; Somharuthai Jaroensiri | 2 – 0 (15–4, 15–1) | Lisa Bryant; Jenny Gibson |

South Korea
5
Queen Elizabeth Stadium
20 February 1992

Australia
0

| | | Result |
|---|---|---|---|
| 1 | Bang Soo-hyun | 2 – 0 (11–1, 11–2) | Anna Lao |
| 2 | Shim Eun-jung | 2 – 0 (11–3, 11–2) | Rhonda Cator |
| 3 | Park Jin-hyun | 2 – 1 (4–11, 11–9, 11–2) | Lisa Bryant |
| 4 | Chung Myung-hee; Hwang Hye-young | 2 – 0 (15–5, 15–3) | Rhonda Cator; Anna Lao |
| 5 | Gil Young-ah; Lee Heung-soon | 2 – 0 (15–3, 18–14) | Lisa Bryant; Jenny Gibson |

Thailand
3
Queen Elizabeth Stadium
20 February 1992

India
2

| | | Result |
|---|---|---|---|
| 1 | Somharuthai Jaroensiri | 2 – 0 | Madhumita Bisht |
| 2 | Plernta Boonyarit | 1 – 2 | Manjusha Pavangadkar |
| 3 | Pornsawan Plungwech | 2 – 0 | Nancy Keith |
| 4 | Ladawan Mulasartsatorn; Piyathip Sansaniyakulvilai | 2 – 0 | Archana Deodhar; Manjusha Pavangadkar |
| 5 | Plernta Boonyarit; Somharuthai Jaroensiri | 1 – 2 | Seema Bhandari; Sudha Padmanabhan |

South Korea
5
Queen Elizabeth Stadium
21 February 1992

Thailand
0

| | | Result |
|---|---|---|---|
| 1 | Bang Soo-hyun | 2 – 0 | Somharuthai Jaroensiri |
| 2 | Lee Heung-soon | 2 – 0 | Plernta Boonyarit |
| 3 | Park Jin-hyun | 2 – 1 | Pornsawan Plungwech |
| 4 | Chung Myung-hee; Hwang Hye-young | 2 – 0 | Ladawan Mulasartsatorn; Piyathip Sansaniyakulvilai |
| 5 | Gil Young-ah; Shim Eun-jung | 2 – 0 | Plernta Boonyarit; Somharuthai Jaroensiri |

Australia
5
Queen Elizabeth Stadium
21 February 1992

India
0

| | | Result |
|---|---|---|---|
| 1 | Anna Lao | 2 – 0 | Madhumita Bisht |
| 2 | Rhonda Cator | 2 – 0 | Manjusha Pavangadkar |
| 3 | Lisa Bryant | 2 – 0 | Nancy Keith |
| 4 | Rhonda Cator; Anna Lao | 2 – 0 | Archana Deodhar; Manjusha Pavangadkar |
| 5 | Lisa Bryant; Jenny Gibson | 2 – 1 | Seema Bhandari; Sudha Padmanabhan |

=== Knockout stage ===
Semi-finals
Indonesia | 5
Thailand | 0
Japan | 0
South Korea | 5

Final
Indonesia | 3
South Korea | 2
Third place
Thailand | 1
Japan | 4

==== Semi-finals ====
Indonesia
5
Queen Elizabeth Stadium
23 February 1992

Thailand
0

| | | Result |
|---|---|---|---|
| 1 | Susi Susanti | 2 – 0 | Somharuthai Jaroensiri |
| 2 | Sarwendah Kusumawardhani | 2 – 0 | Plernta Boonyarit |
| 3 | Yuliani Santosa | 2 – 0 | Pornsawan Plungwech |
| 4 | Erma Sulistianingsih; Rosiana Tendean | 2 – 0 | Ladawan Mulasartsatorn; Piyathip Sansaniyakulvilai |
| 5 | Finarsih; Lili Tampi | 2 – 0 | Plernta Boonyarit; Somharuthai Jaroensiri |

South Korea
5
Queen Elizabeth Stadium
23 February 1992

Japan
0

| | | Result |
|---|---|---|---|
| 1 | Bang Soo-hyun | 2 – 0 | Hisako Mizui |
| 2 | Lee Heung-soon | 2 – 0 | Aiko Miyamura |
| 3 | Park Jin-hyun | 2 – 1 | Harumi Kohara |
| 4 | Chung Myung-hee; Hwang Hye-young | 2 – 0 | Kimiko Jinnai; Hisako Mori |
| 5 | Gil Young-ah; Shim Eun-jung | 2 – 0 | Tomomi Matsuo; Kyoko Sasage |

==== Third place ====
Japan
4
Queen Elizabeth Stadium
24 February 1992

Thailand
1

| | | Result |
|---|---|---|---|
| 1 | Hisako Mizui | 1 – 2 (11–6, 6–11, 5–11) | Somharuthai Jaroensiri |
| 2 | Aiko Miyamura | 2 – 0 (11–5, 11–3) | Plernta Boonyarit |
| 3 | Haruko Yachi | 2 – 1 (1–11, 11–8, 12–11) | Pornsawan Plungwech |
| 4 | Tomomi Matsuo; Kyoko Sasage | 2 – 0 (15–7, 17–15) | Ladawan Mulasartsatorn; Piyathip Sansaniyakulvilai |
| 5 | Aiko Miyamura; Hisako Mori | 2 – 0 (15–9, 15–9) | Plernta Boonyarit; Somharuthai Jaroensiri |

==== Final ====
Indonesia
3
Queen Elizabeth Stadium
24 February 1992

South Korea
2

| | | Result |
|---|---|---|---|
| 1 | Sarwendah Kusumawardhani | 2 – 0 (11–6, 7–11, 12–11) | Shim Eun-jung |
| 2 | Yuliani Santosa | 2 – 0 (8–11, 11–1, 11–5) | Park Soo-yun |
| 3 | Yuni Kartika | 0 – 2 (8–11, 0–11) | Park Jin-hyun |
| 4 | Erma Sulistianingsih; Rosiana Tendean | 0 – 2 (4–15, 5–15) | Bang Soo-hyun; Hwang Hye-young |
| 5 | Finarsih; Lili Tampi | 2 – 0 (15–10, 15–9) | Chung Myung-hee; Lee Heung-soon |

== European Zone ==
The European qualifying rounds were held in Maaspoort in 's-Hertogenbosch, Netherlands. South Africa made their return to the qualifying rounds since 1970 when the team was barred from international competitions following South Africa's policy on apartheid.

=== First round ===
==== Group A ====
| Pos | Team | Pld | W | L | MF | MA | MD | Pts | Qualification |
|---|---|---|---|---|---|---|---|---|---|
| 1 | South Africa | 3 | 3 | 0 | 14 | 1 | +13 | 3 | Advance to second round |
| 2 | Italy | 3 | 2 | 1 | 11 | 4 | +7 | 2 | |
| 3 | Cyprus | 3 | 1 | 2 | 5 | 10 | −5 | 1 | |
| 4 | Luxembourg | 3 | 0 | 3 | 0 | 15 | −15 | 0 | |

Source: intbadfed.org

Italy
5
Maaspoort
16 February 1992

Luxembourg
0

| | | Result |
|---|---|---|---|
| 1 | Petra Schrott | 2 – 0 | Colette Christnach |
| 2 | Beate Dejaco | 2 – 0 | Anne-Marie Nau |
| 3 | Maria Luisa Mur | 2 – 0 | Isabelle Feiereisen |
| 4 | Tanja Egger; Petra Schrott | 2 – 0 | Colette Christnach; Isabelle Feiereisen |
| 5 | Beate Dejaco; Petra Irsara | 2 – 0 | Pia Juchem; Nancy Mauer |

South Africa
5
Maaspoort
16 February 1992

Cyprus
0

| | | Result |
|---|---|---|---|
| 1 | Lina Fourie | 2 – 0 | Elena Iasonos |
| 2 | Augusta Phillips | 2 – 0 | Matilda Kazantzian |
| 3 | Vanessa van der Walt | 2 – 0 | Maria Iasonos |
| 4 | Lina Fourie; Vanessa van der Walt | 2 – 0 | Elena Iasonos; Matilda Kazantzian |
| 5 | Augusta Phillips; Tracey Thompson | 2 – 0 | Christina Christofia; Maria Iasonos |

Italy
5
Maaspoort
17 February 1992

Cyprus
0

| | | Result |
|---|---|---|---|
| 1 | Petra Schrott | 2 – 0 | Elena Iasonos |
| 2 | Beate Dejaco | 2 – 0 | Matilda Kazantzian |
| 3 | Maria Luisa Mur | 2 – 0 | Maria Iasonos |
| 4 | Tanja Egger; Petra Schrott | 2 – 0 | Elena Iasonos; Maria Iasonos |
| 5 | Beate Dejaco; Petra Irsara | 2 – 0 | Christina Christofia; Matilda Kazantzian |

South Africa
5
Maaspoort
17 February 1992

Luxembourg
0

| | | Result |
|---|---|---|---|
| 1 | Lina Fourie | 2 – 0 | Colette Christnach |
| 2 | Augusta Phillips | 2 – 0 | Anne-Marie Nau |
| 3 | Vanessa van der Walt | 2 – 0 | Isabelle Feiereisen |
| 4 | Lina Fourie; Vanessa van der Walt | 2 – 0 | Colette Christnach; Isabelle Feiereisen |
| 5 | Augusta Phillips; Tracey Thompson | 2 – 0 | Pia Juchem; Nancy Mauer |

Italy
1
Maaspoort
19 February 1992

South Africa
4

| | | Result |
|---|---|---|---|
| 1 | Petra Schrott | 1 – 2 | Augusta Phillips |
| 2 | Beate Dejaco | 0 – 2 | Vanessa van der Walt |
| 3 | Tanja Egger | 2 – 1 | Tracey Thompson |
| 4 | Tanja Egger; Petra Schrott | 0 – 2 | Lina Fourie; Vanessa van der Walt |
| 5 | Beate Dejaco; Petra Irsara | 0 – 2 | Augusta Phillips; Tracey Thompson |

Cyprus
5
Maaspoort
19 February 1992

Luxembourg
0

| | | Result |
|---|---|---|---|
| 1 | Elena Iasonos | 2 – 0 | Colette Christnach |
| 2 | Matilda Kazantzian | 2 – 0 | Isabelle Feiereisen |
| 3 | Maria Iasonos | 2 – 0 | Pia Juchem |
| 4 | Elena Iasonos; Maria Iasonos | 2 – 0 | Colette Christnach; Isabelle Feiereisen |
| 5 | Christina Christofia; Matilda Kazantzian | 2 – 0 | Nancy Mauer; Anne-Marie Nau |

==== Group B ====
| Pos | Team | Pld | W | L | MF | MA | MD | Pts | Qualification |
|---|---|---|---|---|---|---|---|---|---|
| 1 | Hungary | 3 | 3 | 0 | 12 | 3 | +9 | 3 | Advance to second round |
| 2 | Switzerland | 3 | 2 | 1 | 11 | 4 | +7 | 2 | |
| 3 | Iceland | 3 | 1 | 2 | 6 | 9 | −3 | 1 | |
| 4 | Mexico | 3 | 0 | 3 | 1 | 14 | −13 | 0 | |

Source: intbadfed.org

Switzerland
4
Maaspoort
17 February 1992

Iceland
1

| | | Result |
|---|---|---|---|
| 1 | Bettina Villars | 2 – 0 | Elsa Nielsen |
| 2 | Silvia Albrecht | 2 – 0 | Þórdís Edwald |
| 3 | Bettina Gfeller | 2 – 0 | Ása Pálsdóttir |
| 4 | Silvia Albrecht; Bettina Gfeller | 2 – 0 | Guðrún Júlíusdóttir; Birna Petersen |
| 5 | Bettina Villars; Yvonne Naef | 1 – 2 | Þórdís Edwald; Ása Pálsdóttir |

Hungary
5
Maaspoort
17 February 1992

Mexico
0

| | | Result |
|---|---|---|---|
| 1 | Andrea Harsági | 2 – 0 | María de la Paz Luna |
| 2 | Csilla Fórián | 2 – 1 | Ana Laura de la Torre |
| 3 | Andrea Dakó | 2 – 0 | Mónica Rojas |
| 4 | Andrea Dakó; Csilla Fórián | 2 – 0 | Ana Laura de la Torre; Gabriela Melgoza |
| 5 | Andrea Harsági; Andrea Ódor | 2 – 0 | Mónica Rojas; Svetlana Serralde |

Switzerland
5
Maaspoort
18 February 1992

Mexico
0

| | | Result |
|---|---|---|---|
| 1 | Bettina Villars | 2 – 0 (11–5, 12–9) | María de la Paz Luna |
| 2 | Silvia Albrecht | 2 – 0 (11–5, 11–0) | Svetlana Serralde |
| 3 | Iria Gerstenkorn | 2 – 0 (11–7, 11–4) | Ana Laura de la Torre |
| 4 | Silvia Albrecht; Bettina Gfeller | 2 – 0 (15–1, 15–8) | Ana Laura de la Torre; Gabriela Melgoza |
| 5 | Bettina Villars; Yvonne Naef | 2 – 0 (15–4, 15–7) | Mónica Rojas; Svetlana Serralde |

Hungary
4
Maaspoort
18 February 1992

Iceland
1

| | | Result |
|---|---|---|---|
| 1 | Andrea Harsági | 2 – 1 | Elsa Nielsen |
| 2 | Csilla Fórián | 2 – 1 | Þórdís Edwald |
| 3 | Andrea Dakó | 2 – 0 | Guðrún Júlíusdóttir |
| 4 | Andrea Dakó; Csilla Fórián | 2 – 0 | Guðrún Júlíusdóttir; Birna Petersen |
| 5 | Andrea Harsági; Andrea Ódor | 1 – 2 | Þórdís Edwald; Ása Pálsdóttir |

Switzerland
2
Maaspoort
19 February 1992

Hungary
3

| | | Result |
|---|---|---|---|
| 1 | Silvia Albrecht | 2 – 1 | Andrea Harsági |
| 2 | Iria Gerstenkorn | 1 – 2 | Csilla Fórián |
| 3 | Bettina Gfeller | 1 – 2 | Andrea Dakó |
| 4 | Silvia Albrecht; Bettina Gfeller | 2 – 1 | Andrea Dakó; Csilla Fórián |
| 5 | Bettina Villars; Yvonne Naef | 1 – 2 | Andrea Harsági; Andrea Ódor |

Iceland
4
Maaspoort
19 February 1992

Mexico
1

| | | Result |
|---|---|---|---|
| 1 | Elsa Nielsen | 1 – 2 | María de la Paz Luna |
| 2 | Þórdís Edwald | 2 – 0 | Svetlana Serralde |
| 3 | Guðrún Júlíusdóttir | 2 – 1 | Ana Laura de la Torre |
| 4 | Guðrún Júlíusdóttir; Birna Petersen | 2 – 0 | Ana Laura de la Torre; Gabriela Melgoza |
| 5 | Þórdís Edwald; Ása Pálsdóttir | 2 – 0 | Mónica Rojas; Svetlana Serralde |

==== Group C ====
| Pos | Team | Pld | W | L | MF | MA | MD | Pts | Qualification |
|---|---|---|---|---|---|---|---|---|---|
| 1 | United States | 3 | 3 | 0 | 13 | 2 | +11 | 3 | Advance to second round |
| 2 | Finland | 3 | 2 | 1 | 11 | 4 | +7 | 2 | |
| 3 | Austria | 3 | 1 | 2 | 5 | 10 | −5 | 1 | |
| 4 | Belgium | 3 | 0 | 3 | 1 | 14 | −13 | 0 | |

Source: intbadfed.org

United States
3
Maaspoort
17 February 1992

Finland
2

| | | Result |
|---|---|---|---|
| 1 | Joy Kitzmiller | 0 – 2 (7–11, 0–11) | Nina Sundberg |
| 2 | Erika von Heiland | 2 – 1 (7–11, 11–2, 11–3) | Susanna Dahlberg |
| 3 | Liz Aronsohn | 2 – 1 (12–10, 11–12, 11–3) | Ulrika von Pfaler |
| 4 | Linda French; Joy Kitzmiller | 2 – 0 (15–3, 15–3) | Nina Sundberg; Ulrika von Pfaler |
| 5 | Ann French; Erika von Heiland | 1 – 2 (10–15, 15–10, 12–15) | Susanna Dahlberg; Christina von Pfaler |

Austria
4
Maaspoort
17 February 1992

Belgium
1

| | | Result |
|---|---|---|---|
| 1 | Sabine Aberer | 2 – 0 | Heidi Vrancken |
| 2 | Brigitte Langthaler | 2 – 0 | Annemie Buyse |
| 3 | Gabriele Kumpfmüller | 1 – 2 | Marie-Christine Donnay |
| 4 | Sabine Aberer; Sigrun Ploner | 2 – 0 | Annemie Buyse; Heidi Vrancken |
| 5 | Gabriele Kumpfmüller; Brigitte Langthaler | 2 – 0 | Marie-Christine Donnay; Caroline Persyn |

United States
5
Maaspoort
18 February 1992

Belgium
0

| | | Result |
|---|---|---|---|
| 1 | Joy Kitzmiller | 2 – 0 | Heidi Vrancken |
| 2 | Erika von Heiland | 2 – 0 | Annemie Buyse |
| 3 | Liz Aronsohn | 2 – 1 | Caroline Persyn |
| 4 | Linda French; Joy Kitzmiller | 2 – 0 | Annemie Buyse; Heidi Vrancken |
| 5 | Ann French; Erika von Heiland | 2 – 0 | Marie-Christine Donnay; Caroline Persyn |

Austria
1
Maaspoort
18 February 1992

Finland
4

| | | Result |
|---|---|---|---|
| 1 | Sabine Aberer | 2 – 1 | Nina Sundberg |
| 2 | Brigitte Langthaler | 1 – 2 | Susanna Dahlberg |
| 3 | Gabriele Kumpfmüller | 0 – 2 | Ulrika von Pfaler |
| 4 | Sabine Aberer; Sigrun Ploner | 0 – 2 | Nina Sundberg; Christina von Pfaler |
| 5 | Gabriele Kumpfmüller; Brigitte Langthaler | 0 – 2 | Susanna Dahlberg; Ulrika von Pfaler |

United States
5
Maaspoort
19 February 1992

Austria
0

| | | Result |
|---|---|---|---|
| 1 | Joy Kitzmiller | 2 – 0 | Sabine Aberer |
| 2 | Erika von Heiland | 2 – 0 | Brigitte Langthaler |
| 3 | Liz Aronsohn | 2 – 1 | Gabriele Kumpfmüller |
| 4 | Linda French; Joy Kitzmiller | 2 – 0 | Sabine Aberer; Sigrun Ploner |
| 5 | Ann French; Erika von Heiland | 2 – 0 | Gabriele Kumpfmüller; Brigitte Langthaler |

Finland
5
Maaspoort
19 February 1992

Belgium
0

| | | Result |
|---|---|---|---|
| 1 | Nina Sundberg | 2 – 0 | Heidi Vrancken |
| 2 | Susanna Dahlberg | 2 – 0 | Annemie Buyse |
| 3 | Ulrika von Pfaler | 2 – 0 | Caroline Persyn |
| 4 | Nina Sundberg; Ulrika von Pfaler | 2 – 0 | Els Baert; Annemie Buyse |
| 5 | Susanna Dahlberg; Christina von Pfaler | 2 – 0 | Gaelle Lanotte; Peggy Mampaey |

==== Group D ====
| Pos | Team | Pld | W | L | MF | MA | MD | Pts | Qualification |
|---|---|---|---|---|---|---|---|---|---|
| 1 | France | 2 | 2 | 0 | 9 | 1 | +8 | 2 | Advance to second round |
| 2 | Wales | 2 | 1 | 1 | 6 | 4 | +2 | 1 | |
| 3 | Spain | 2 | 0 | 2 | 0 | 10 | −10 | 0 | |
| 4 | Mauritius | 0 | 0 | 0 | 0 | 0 | 0 | 0 | Withdrew |

Source: intbadfed.org

France
5
Maaspoort
17 February 1992

Spain
0

| | | Result |
|---|---|---|---|
| 1 | Sandra Dimbour | 2 – 0 | Esther Sanz |
| 2 | Sandrine Lefèvre | 2 – 0 | Ana Carina Anaya |
| 3 | Élodie Mansuy | 2 – 0 | Dolores Marco |
| 4 | Sandra Dimbour; Sandrine Lefèvre | 2 – 0 | Cristina González; Mónica González |
| 5 | Virginie Delvingt; Élodie Mansuy | 2 – 0 | Ana Carina Anaya; Esther Sanz |

Wales
5
Maaspoort
18 February 1992

Spain
0

| | | Result |
|---|---|---|---|
| 1 | Kelly Morgan | 2 – 0 | Esther Sanz |
| 2 | Rachele Edwards | 2 – 0 | Ana Carina Anaya |
| 3 | Sian Williams | 2 – 0 | Dolores Marco |
| 4 | Hilary Tarleton; Sian Williams | 2 – 0 | Cristina González; Dolores Marco |
| 5 | Kelly Morgan; Rachael Phipps | 2 – 0 | Ana Carina Anaya; Esther Sanz |

France
4
Maaspoort
19 February 1992

Wales
1

| | | Result |
|---|---|---|---|
| 1 | Sandra Dimbour | 1 – 2 | Kelly Morgan |
| 2 | Sandrine Lefèvre | 2 – 1 | Rachele Edwards |
| 3 | Élodie Mansuy | 2 – 1 | Sian Williams |
| 4 | Sandra Dimbour; Sandrine Lefèvre | 2 – 1 | Hilary Tarleton; Sian Williams |
| 5 | Virginie Delvingt; Élodie Mansuy | 2 – 1 | Kelly Morgan; Rachael Phipps |

=== Second round ===
==== Group W ====
| Pos | Team | Pld | W | L | MF | MA | MD | Pts | Qualification |
|---|---|---|---|---|---|---|---|---|---|
| 1 | Denmark | 3 | 3 | 0 | 15 | 0 | +15 | 3 | Advance to knockout stage |
| 2 | Scotland | 3 | 2 | 1 | 9 | 6 | +3 | 2 | |
| 3 | Poland | 3 | 1 | 2 | 6 | 9 | −3 | 1 | |
| 4 | Hungary | 3 | 0 | 3 | 0 | 15 | −15 | 0 | |

Source: intbadfed.org

Denmark
5
Maaspoort
20 February 1992

Hungary
0

| | | Result |
|---|---|---|---|
| 1 | Pernille Nedergaard | 2 – 0 (11–3, 11–8) | Andrea Harsági |
| 2 | Camilla Martin | 2 – 0 (11–2, 11–2) | Csilla Fórián |
| 3 | Helle Andersen | 2 – 0 (11–4, 11–1) | Andrea Dakó |
| 4 | Pernille Dupont; Lotte Olsen | 2 – 0 (15–3, 15–10) | Andrea Dakó; Csilla Fórián |
| 5 | Lisbet Stuer-Lauridsen; Marianne Rasmussen | 2 – 0 (15–2, 15–9) | Andrea Harsági; Andrea Ódor |

Scotland
4
Maaspoort
20 February 1992

Poland
1

| | | Result |
|---|---|---|---|
| 1 | Anne Gibson | 2 – 0 (11–2, 11–1) | Katarzyna Krasowska |
| 2 | Gillian Brown | 2 – 0 (6–11, 11–1, 11–7) | Wioletta Wilk |
| 3 | Aileen Nairn | 2 – 1 (11–7, 3–11, 12–10) | Bożena Bąk |
| 4 | Elinor Allen; Jennifer Allen | 2 – 0 (15–7, 15–5) | Bożena Haracz; Beata Syta |
| 5 | Anne Gibson; Aileen Nairn | 0 – 2 (4–15, 6–15) | Bożena Bąk; Wioletta Wilk |

Denmark
5
Maaspoort
21 February 1992

Poland
0

| | | Result |
|---|---|---|---|
| 1 | Pernille Nedergaard | 2 – 0 | Katarzyna Krasowska |
| 2 | Camilla Martin | 2 – 0 | Wioletta Wilk |
| 3 | Helle Andersen | 2 – 1 | Bożena Bąk |
| 4 | Pernille Dupont; Lotte Olsen | 2 – 0 | Bożena Haracz; Beata Syta |
| 5 | Lisbet Stuer-Lauridsen; Marianne Rasmussen | 2 – 1 | Bożena Bąk; Wioletta Wilk |

Scotland
5
Maaspoort
21 February 1992

Hungary
0

| | | Result |
|---|---|---|---|
| 1 | Anne Gibson | 2 – 0 (11–3, 12–10) | Andrea Harsági |
| 2 | Gillian Brown | 2 – 0 (11–3, 11–6) | Csilla Fórián |
| 3 | Aileen Nairn | 2 – 1 (11–5, 11–4) | Andrea Dakó |
| 4 | Elinor Allen; Jennifer Allen | 2 – 0 (15–4, 15–11) | Andrea Dakó; Csilla Fórián |
| 5 | Anne Gibson; Aileen Nairn | 0 – 2 (15–3, 15–6) | Andrea Harsági; Andrea Ódor |

Denmark
5
Maaspoort
22 February 1992

Scotland
0

| | | Result |
|---|---|---|---|
| 1 | Pernille Nedergaard | 2 – 0 | Anne Gibson |
| 2 | Camilla Martin | 2 – 0 | Gillian Brown |
| 3 | Helle Andersen | 2 – 1 | Aileen Nairn |
| 4 | Pernille Dupont; Lotte Olsen | 2 – 0 | Elinor Allen; Jennifer Allen |
| 5 | Lisbet Stuer-Lauridsen; Marianne Rasmussen | 2 – 0 | Anne Gibson; Aileen Nairn |

Poland
5
Maaspoort
22 February 1992

Hungary
0

| | | Result |
|---|---|---|---|
| 1 | Katarzyna Krasowska | 2 – 0 (11–5, 11–1) | Csilla Fórián |
| 2 | Wioletta Wilk | 2 – 0 (3–11, 11–4, 11–6) | Andrea Dakó |
| 3 | Bożena Bąk | 2 – 1 (10–12, 11–8, 11–1) | Andrea Ódor |
| 4 | Bożena Haracz; Beata Syta | 2 – 1 (15–10, 12–15, 15–7) | Andrea Dakó; Csilla Fórián |
| 5 | Bożena Bąk; Wioletta Wilk | 2 – 0 (15–1, 15–6) | Andrea Harsági; Andrea Ódor |

==== Group X ====
| Pos | Team | Pld | W | L | MF | MA | MD | Pts | Qualification |
|---|---|---|---|---|---|---|---|---|---|
| 1 | Netherlands | 3 | 3 | 0 | 15 | 0 | +15 | 3 | Advance to knockout stage |
| 2 | Germany | 3 | 2 | 1 | 9 | 6 | +3 | 2 | |
| 3 | Bulgaria | 3 | 1 | 2 | 6 | 9 | −3 | 1 | |
| 4 | France | 3 | 0 | 3 | 0 | 15 | −15 | 0 | |

Source: intbadfed.org

Netherlands
5
Maaspoort
20 February 1992

France
0

| | | Result |
|---|---|---|---|
| 1 | Eline Coene | 2 – 0 (11–5, 11–2) | Sandra Dimbour |
| 2 | Astrid van der Knaap | 2 – 0 (11–1, 11–0) | Sandrine Lefèvre |
| 3 | Elvira van Elven | 2 – 0 (11–3, 11–2) | Élodie Mansuy |
| 4 | Erica van den Heuvel; Nicole van Hooren | 2 – 0 (15–5, 15–6) | Sandra Dimbour; Sandrine Lefèvre |
| 5 | Monique Hoogland; Sonja Mellink | 2 – 0 (15–2, 15–3) | Virginie Delvingt; Élodie Mansuy |

Germany
4
Maaspoort
20 February 1992

Bulgaria
1

| | | Result |
|---|---|---|---|
| 1 | Katrin Schmidt | 2 – 1 | Viktoria Hristova |
| 2 | Kersten Ubben | 1 – 2 | Diana Filipova |
| 3 | Christine Skropke | 2 – 0 | Anetha Stamboliyska |
| 4 | Anne-Katrin Seid; Karen Stechmann | 2 – 0 | Emilia Dimitrova; Diana Filipova |
| 5 | Katrin Schmidt; Kersten Ubben | 2 – 0 | Neli Nedyalkova; Anetha Stamboliyska |

Netherlands
5
Maaspoort
21 February 1992

Bulgaria
0

| | | Result |
|---|---|---|---|
| 1 | Eline Coene | 2 – 0 (11–1, 11–2) | Viktoria Hristova |
| 2 | Astrid van der Knaap | 2 – 0 (11–2, 11–4) | Diana Filipova |
| 3 | Erica van den Heuvel | 2 – 0 (11–7, 11–2) | Anetha Stamboliyska |
| 4 | Eline Coene; Erica van den Heuvel | 2 – 0 (15–0, 15–2) | Emilia Dimitrova; Diana Filipova |
| 5 | Monique Hoogland; Sonja Mellink | 2 – 0 (15–2, 15–7) | Neli Nedyalkova; Anetha Stamboliyska |

Germany
5
Maaspoort
21 February 1992

France
0

| | | Result |
|---|---|---|---|
| 1 | Katrin Schmidt | 2 – 0 | Sandra Dimbour |
| 2 | Kersten Ubben | 2 – 0 | Sandrine Lefèvre |
| 3 | Christine Skropke | 2 – 1 | Élodie Mansuy |
| 4 | Anne-Katrin Seid; Karen Stechmann | 2 – 0 | Sandra Dimbour; Sandrine Lefèvre |
| 5 | Katrin Schmidt; Kersten Ubben | 2 – 0 | Virginie Delvingt; Élodie Mansuy |

Netherlands
5
Maaspoort
22 February 1992

Germany
0

| | | Result |
|---|---|---|---|
| 1 | Eline Coene | 2 – 0 (11–1, 11–7) | Katrin Schmidt |
| 2 | Astrid van der Knaap | 2 – 0 (11–7, 11–3) | Kersten Ubben |
| 3 | Erica van den Heuvel | 2 – 1 (11–12, 11–0, 11–5) | Christine Skropke |
| 4 | Monique Hoogland; Sonja Mellink | 2 – 1 (15–11, 17–18, 15–7) | Anne-Katrin Seid; Erica van den Heuvel |
| 5 | Eline Coene; Erica van den Heuvel | 2 – 0 (15–2, 15–3) | Katrin Schmidt; Kersten Ubben |

Bulgaria
5
Maaspoort
22 February 1992

France
0

| | | Result |
|---|---|---|---|
| 1 | Viktoria Hristova | 2 – 0 | Sandra Dimbour |
| 2 | Diana Filipova | 2 – 0 | Sandrine Lefèvre |
| 3 | Anetha Stamboliyska | 2 – 1 | Élodie Mansuy |
| 4 | Emilia Dimitrova; Diana Filipova | 2 – 1 | Sandra Dimbour; Sandrine Lefèvre |
| 5 | Neli Nedyalkova; Anetha Stamboliyska | 2 – 1 | Virginie Delvingt; Élodie Mansuy |

==== Group Y ====
| Pos | Team | Pld | W | L | MF | MA | MD | Pts | Qualification |
|---|---|---|---|---|---|---|---|---|---|
| 1 | England | 3 | 3 | 0 | 13 | 2 | +11 | 3 | Advance to knockout stage |
| 2 | Canada | 3 | 2 | 1 | 11 | 4 | +7 | 2 | |
| 3 | United States | 3 | 1 | 2 | 5 | 10 | −5 | 1 | |
| 4 | Czechoslovakia | 3 | 0 | 3 | 1 | 11 | −10 | 0 | |

Source: intbadfed.org

England
5
Maaspoort
20 February 1992

United States
0

| | | Result |
|---|---|---|---|
| 1 | Helen Troke | 2 – 0 | Joy Kitzmiller |
| 2 | Fiona Smith | 2 – 0 | Erika von Heiland |
| 3 | Suzanne Louis | 2 – 0 | Liz Aronsohn |
| 4 | Gillian Gowers; Sara Sankey | 2 – 0 | Linda French; Joy Kitzmiller |
| 5 | Julie Bradbury; Gillian Clark | 2 – 0 | Ann French; Erika von Heiland |

Canada
4
Maaspoort
20 February 1992

Czechoslovakia
1

| | | Result |
|---|---|---|---|
| 1 | Si-An Deng | 2 – 0 | Ludmila Šimáková |
| 2 | Denyse Julien | 2 – 0 | Eva Lacinová |
| 3 | Doris Piché | 2 – 0 | Jitka Lacinová |
| 4 | Milaine Cloutier; Denyse Julien | 1 – 2 | Alena Horáková; Ludmila Šimáková |
| 5 | Heather Ostrom; Doris Piché | 2 – 0 | Eva Lacinová; Jitka Lacinová |

England
5
Maaspoort
21 February 1992

Czechoslovakia
0

| | | Result |
|---|---|---|---|
| 1 | Helen Troke | 2 – 0 | Ludmila Šimáková |
| 2 | Fiona Smith | 2 – 0 | Eva Lacinová |
| 3 | Suzanne Louis | 2 – 0 | Jitka Lacinová |
| 4 | Gillian Gowers; Sara Sankey | 2 – 0 | Alena Horáková; Ludmila Šimáková |
| 5 | Julie Bradbury; Gillian Clark | 2 – 0 | Eva Lacinová; Jitka Lacinová |

Canada
5
Maaspoort
21 February 1992

United States
0

| | | Result |
|---|---|---|---|
| 1 | Si-An Deng | 2 – 0 | Joy Kitzmiller |
| 2 | Denyse Julien | 2 – 0 | Erika von Heiland |
| 3 | Doris Piché | 2 – 0 | Liz Aronsohn |
| 4 | Milaine Cloutier; Denyse Julien | 2 – 0 | Linda French; Joy Kitzmiller |
| 5 | Heather Ostrom; Doris Piché | 2 – 0 | Ann French; Erika von Heiland |

England
3
Maaspoort
22 February 1992

Canada
2

| | | Result |
|---|---|---|---|
| 1 | Helen Troke | 1 – 2 | Si-An Deng |
| 2 | Fiona Smith | 1 – 2 | Denyse Julien |
| 3 | Suzanne Louis | 2 – 0 | Doris Piché |
| 4 | Gillian Gowers; Sara Sankey | 2 – 0 | Milaine Cloutier; Denyse Julien |
| 5 | Julie Bradbury; Gillian Clark | 2 – 0 | Heather Ostrom; Doris Piché |

United States
5
Maaspoort
22 February 1992

Czechoslovakia
0

| | | Result |
|---|---|---|---|
| 1 | Joy Kitzmiller | 2 – 1 | Ludmila Šimáková |
| 2 | Erika von Heiland | 2 – 0 | Eva Lacinová |
| 3 | Liz Aronsohn | 2 – 1 | Jitka Lacinová |
| 4 | Linda French; Joy Kitzmiller | 2 – 0 | Alena Horáková; Ludmila Šimáková |
| 5 | Ann French; Erika von Heiland | 2 – 1 | Eva Lacinová; Jitka Lacinová |

==== Group Z ====
| Pos | Team | Pld | W | L | MF | MA | MD | Pts | Qualification |
|---|---|---|---|---|---|---|---|---|---|
| 1 | Sweden | 2 | 2 | 0 | 10 | 0 | +10 | 2 | Advance to knockout stage |
| 2 | Ireland | 2 | 1 | 1 | 3 | 7 | −4 | 1 | |
| 3 | South Africa | 2 | 0 | 2 | 2 | 8 | −6 | 0 | |
| 4 | CIS | 0 | 0 | 0 | 0 | 0 | 0 | 0 | Disqualified |

Source: intbadfed.org

Sweden
5
Maaspoort
20 February 1992

South Africa
0

| | | Result |
|---|---|---|---|
| 1 | Christine Magnusson | 2 – 0 (11–1, 11–2) | Lina Fourie |
| 2 | Margit Borg | 2 – 0 (11–3, 15–2) | Augusta Phillips |
| 3 | Karolina Ericsson | 2 – 0 (11–6, 11–3) | Vanessa van der Walt |
| 4 | Catrine Bengtsson; Maria Bengtsson | 2 – 0 (15–1, 15–5) | Augusta Phillips; Tracey Thompson |
| 5 | Margit Borg; Lim Xiaoqing | 2 – 0 (15–5, 15–1) | Lina Fourie; Vanessa van der Walt |

Ireland
3
Maaspoort
21 February 1992

South Africa
2

| | | Result |
|---|---|---|---|
| 1 | Ciara Doheny | 2 – 0 | Lina Fourie |
| 2 | Sonya McGinn | 1 – 2 | Augusta Phillips |
| 3 | Ann Stephens | 1 – 2 | Vanessa van der Walt |
| 4 | Ciara Doheny; Ann Stephens | 2 – 1 | Augusta Phillips; Tracey Thompson |
| 5 | Sonya McGinn; Jayne Plunkett | 2 – 1 | Lina Fourie; Vanessa van der Walt |

Sweden
5
Maaspoort
22 February 1992

Ireland
0

| | | Result |
|---|---|---|---|
| 1 | Christine Magnusson | 2 – 0 | Ciara Doheny |
| 2 | Margit Borg | 2 – 0 | Sonya McGinn |
| 3 | Karolina Ericsson | 2 – 0 | Ann Stephens |
| 4 | Catrine Bengtsson; Maria Bengtsson | 2 – 0 | Ciara Doheny; Ann Stephens |
| 5 | Margit Borg; Lim Xiaoqing | 2 – 0 | Sonya McGinn; Jayne Plunkett |

=== Knockout stage ===
Semi-finals
Sweden | 3
England | 2
Netherlands | 3
Denmark | 2

Final
Sweden | 4
Netherlands | 1
Third place
England | 3
Denmark | 2

==== Semi-finals ====
Sweden
3
Maaspoort
23 February 1992

England
2

| | | Result |
|---|---|---|---|
| 1 | Lim Xiaoqing | 2 – 0 (11–8, 11–1) | Helen Troke |
| 2 | Christine Magnusson | 2 – 0 (11–0, 11–3) | Fiona Smith |
| 3 | Catrine Bengtsson | 0 – 2 (7–11, 6–11) | Suzanne Louis |
| 4 | Lim Xiaoqing; Christine Magnusson | 1 – 2 (15–2, 14–17, 9–15) | Gillian Gowers; Sara Sankey |
| 5 | Catrine Bengtsson; Maria Bengtsson | 2 – 1 (18–17, 15–3) | Julie Bradbury; Gillian Clark |

Denmark
2
Maaspoort
23 February 1992

Netherlands
3

| | | Result |
|---|---|---|---|
| 1 | Pernille Nedergaard | 0 – 2 (6–11, 9–12) | Eline Coene |
| 2 | Camilla Martin | 2 – 0 (12–10, 11–4) | Astrid van der Knaap |
| 3 | Lisbet Stuer-Lauridsen | 0 – 2 (9–11, 3–11) | Erica van den Heuvel |
| 4 | Camilla Martin; Lotte Olsen | 1 – 2 (15–10, 5–15, 3–15) | Eline Coene; Erica van den Heuvel |
| 5 | Pernille Dupont; Lisbet Stuer-Lauridsen | 2 – 1 (15–7, 12–15, 15–11) | Monique Hoogland; Sonja Mellink |

==== Third place ====
Denmark
2
Maaspoort
24 February 1992

England
3

| | | Result |
|---|---|---|---|
| 1 | Pernille Nedergaard | 2 – 1 (12–9, 8–11, 11–5) | Helen Troke |
| 2 | Camilla Martin | 2 – 0 (11–1, 12–11) | Fiona Smith |
| 3 | Helle Andersen | 1 – 2 (12–10, 7–11, 5–11) | Suzanne Louis |
| 4 | Pernille Dupont; Lotte Olsen | 0 – 2 (6–15, 10–15) | Gillian Gowers; Sara Sankey |
| 5 | Marianne Rasmussen; Lisbet Stuer-Lauridsen | 0 – 2 (11–15, 9–15) | Julie Bradbury; Gillian Clark |

==== Final ====
Sweden
4
Maaspoort
24 February 1992

Netherlands
1

| | | Result |
|---|---|---|---|
| 1 | Lim Xiaoqing | 2 – 0 (12–9, 11–7) | Eline Coene |
| 2 | Christine Magnusson | 1 – 2 (6–11, 11–8, 10–12) | Astrid van der Knaap |
| 3 | Catrine Bengtsson | 2 – 0 (11–6, 11–1) | Erica van den Heuvel |
| 4 | Lim Xiaoqing; Christine Magnusson | 2 – 0 (15–3, 15–12) | Eline Coene; Erica van den Heuvel |
| 5 | Catrine Bengtsson; Maria Bengtsson | 2 – 0 (15–6, 15–11) | Monique Hoogland; Sonja Mellink |
