= 1993 IBF World Championships – Women's singles =

Badminton championships

Women's singles at the 1993 IBF World Championships
- Venue: National Indoor Arena
- Location: Birmingham, England
- Dates: May 31, 1993 – June 6, 1993

Medalists
gold medal	Susi Susanti	Indonesia
silver medal	Bang Soo-hyun	South Korea
bronze medal	Ye Zhaoying	China
bronze medal	Tang Jiuhong	China

The 8th IBF World Championships (World Badminton Championships) were held in Birmingham, England in 1993. Following the results of the women's singles.

== Main stage ==
=== Section 1 ===
First round
(Indonesia) Susi Susanti	11	11
(Netherlands) Monique Hoogland	4	2
(Republic of Ireland) Sonya McGinn	12	11
(United States) Andrea Andersson	10	3
(Denmark) Anne Søndergaard	2	11	11
(Austria) Sabine Aberer	11	5	7
(Peru) Lorena Blanco	w.o.
(Mexico) Laura Amaya
(China) Hu Ning	11	11
(Bulgaria) Diana Koleva	6	2
(Slovenia) Darja Kranjc	w.o.
(Nigeria) Dayo Oyewusi
(England) Suzanne Louis-Lane	11	11
(Malaysia) Tan Lee Wai	4	2
(India) P. V. V. Lakshmi	11	11
(Czech Republic) Eva Lacinová	6	3

Second round
(Indonesia) Susi Susanti	11	11
(Republic of Ireland) Sonya McGinn	2	1
(Denmark) Anne Søndergaard	11	11
(Peru) Lorena Blanco	0	1
(China) Hu Ning	11	11
(Slovenia) Darja Kranjc	1	1
(England) Suzanne Louis-Lane	11	11
(India) P. V. V. Lakshmi	0	4

Third round
(Indonesia) Susi Susanti	11	11
(Denmark) Anne Søndergaard	6	0
(China) Hu Ning	11	11
(England) Suzanne Louis-Lane	5	8

Fourth round
(Indonesia) Susi Susanti	11	11
(China) Hu Ning	2	5

=== Section 2 ===
First round
(South Korea) Lee Heung-soon	11	11
(Russia) Irina Yakusheva	1	4
(Norway) Tove Hol	w.o.
(Mexico) María de la Paz
(Canada) Si-an Deng	11	11
(Iceland) Birna Petersen	4	3
(Australia) Lisa Campbell	11	11
(Finland) Nina Sundberg	1	1
(Indonesia) Yuni Kartika	11	11
(Wales) Kelly Morgan	0	1
(Nepal) Kalpana Rana Shrestha
(Malta) Jo'Anne Grech	w.o.
(Japan) Hisako Mizui	11	11
(Scotland) Gillian Martin	3	4
(Ukraine) Elena Nozdran	11	11
(Poland) Wioletta Wilk	3	3

Second round
(South Korea) Lee Heung-soon	11	11
(Norway) Tove Hol	2	2
(Canada) Si-an Deng	11	11
(Australia) Lisa Campbell	2	2
(Indonesia) Yuni Kartika	11	11
(Malta) Jo'Anne Grech	1	1
(Japan) Hisako Mizui	11	11
(Ukraine) Elena Nozdran	1	1

Third round
(South Korea) Lee Heung-soon	11	11
(Canada) Si-an Deng	4	5
(Indonesia) Yuni Kartika	12	12
(Japan) Hisako Mizui	10	11

Fourth round
(South Korea) Lee Heung-soon	11	9	11
(Indonesia) Yuni Kartika	5	11	0

=== Section 3 ===
First round
(China) Ye Zhaoying	11	11
(Switzerland) Bettina Villars	3	3
(Australia) Michelle O'Neill	11	11
(Japan) Takako Ida	5	1
(England) Fiona Smith	w.o.
(Mexico) Gabriela Melgoza
(Slovenia) Mateja Slatnar	11	12
(United States) Liz Aronsohn	6	10
(Indonesia) Yuliani Sentosa	11	11
(Norway) Lillian Olavesen	1	2
(Hong Kong) Chan Oi Ni	11	11
(Canada) Milaine Cloutier	1	3
(France) Sandra Dimbour	w.o.
(Poland) Dorota Grzejdak
(New Zealand) Sheree Jefferson	7	11	11
(Malaysia) Wong Mee Hung	11	6	6

Second round
(China) Ye Zhaoying	11	11
(Australia) Michelle O'Neill	6	3
(England) Fiona Smith	11	11
(Slovenia) Mateja Slatnar	5	1
(Indonesia) Yuliani Sentosa	11	11
(Hong Kong) Chan Oi Ni	3	7
(France) Sandra Dimbour	15	15
(New Zealand) Sheree Jefferson	0	0

Third round
(China) Ye Zhaoying	11	11
(England) Fiona Smith	1	6
(Indonesia) Yuliani Sentosa	w.o.
(France) Sandra Dimbour

Fourth round
(China) Ye Zhaoying	11	11	11
(Indonesia) Yuliani Sentosa	4	12	3

=== Section 4 ===
First round
(Thailand) Somharuthai Jaroensiri	11	11
(India) Nancy Keith	7	4
(Sweden) Marina Andrievskaya	11	11
(Belarus) Vlada Chernyavskaya	2	6
(Germany) Nicole Baldewein	11	11
(United States) Ann French	1	0
(Scotland) Aileen Travers	11	11
(Austria) Brigitte Langthaler	4	1
(South Korea) Chung Eun-hwa	11	11
(Bulgaria) Victoria Hristova	2	0
(England) Tanya Woodward	11	11
(Wales) Katie Howell	3	7
(China) Zhang Ning	11	11
(Poland) Katarzyna Krasowska	0	1
(Canada) Robbyn Hermitage	w.o.
(Sweden) Lim Xiaoqing

Second round
(Thailand) Somharuthai Jaroensiri	11	11
(Sweden) Marina Andrievskaya	4	1
(Germany) Nicole Baldewein	11	7	11
(Scotland) Aileen Travers	1	11	7
(South Korea) Chung Eun-hwa	8	11	11
(England) Tanya Woodward	11	6	4
(China) Zhang Ning	15	15
(Canada) Robbyn Hermitage	2	1

Third round
(Thailand) Somharuthai Jaroensiri	11	11
(Germany) Nicole Baldewein	1	3
(South Korea) Chung Eun-hwa	11	5	11
(China) Zhang Ning	6	11	1

Fourth round
(Thailand) Somharuthai Jaroensiri	11	11
(South Korea) Chung Eun-hwa	4	6

=== Section 5 ===
First round
(South Korea) Bang Soo-hyun	11	11
(Czech Republic) Jitka Lacinová	3	0
(Thailand) Pornsawan Plungwech	11	11
(Norway) Sissel Linderoth	2	6
(Scotland) Alison Humby	4	11	11
(India) Manjusha Kanwar	11	4	5
(Malaysia) Zamaliah Sidek	w.o.
(Poland) Monika Lipińska
(Sweden) Christine Magnusson	11	12
(Canada) Denyse Julien	3	11
(Bulgaria) Neli Boteva	w.o.
(Nigeria) Bisi Tiamiyu
(Hong Kong) Wong Chun Fan	w.o.
(Nepal) Subha Shrestha
(France) Sandrine Lefèvre	12	11
(Belgium) Annemie Buyse	11	2

Second round
(South Korea) Bang Soo-hyun	11	11
(Thailand) Pornsawan Plungwech	4	3
(Scotland) Alison Humby	11	11
(Malaysia) Zamaliah Sidek	1	7
(Sweden) Christine Magnusson	11	11
(Bulgaria) Neli Boteva	3	2
(Hong Kong) Wong Chun Fan	11	11
(France) Sandrine Lefèvre	3	4

Third round
(South Korea) Bang Soo-hyun	11	11
(Scotland) Alison Humby	1	4
(Sweden) Christine Magnusson	11	11
(Hong Kong) Wong Chun Fan	1	5

Fourth round
(South Korea) Bang Soo-hyun	11	11
(Sweden) Christine Magnusson	7	7

=== Section 6 ===
First round
(China) Liu Yuhong	11	11
(Bulgaria) Dimitriika Dimitrova	2	5
(Australia) Rhonda Cator	11
(Wales) Rachael Phipps
(Russia) Marina Yakusheva	11	11
(Hungary) Andrea Harsági	4	2
(Scotland) Jennifer Williamson	w.o.
(New Zealand) Yue Jin Liao
(Indonesia) Minarti Timur	11	11
(Germany) Christine Skropke	5	4
(Austria) Gabriele Kumpfmüller	12	11
(Belarus) Tatiana Gerassimovitch	9	3
(Kazakhstan) Irina Gritsenko	w.o.
(Malta) Rachel Williams
(England) Sarah Hore	11	12
(United States) Erika von Heiland	3	9

Second round
(China) Liu Yuhong	12	11
(Australia) Rhonda Cator	11	4
(Russia) Marina Yakusheva	11	11
(Scotland) Jennifer Williamson	3	0
(Indonesia) Minarti Timur	11	11
(Austria) Gabriele Kumpfmüller	2	0
(Kazakhstan) Irina Gritsenko	11	11
(England) Sarah Hore	6	6

Third round
(China) Liu Yuhong	11	11
(Russia) Marina Yakusheva	1	2
(Indonesia) Minarti Timur	11	11
(Kazakhstan) Irina Gritsenko	2	6

Fourth round
(China) Liu Yuhong	11	11
(Indonesia) Minarti Timur	3	3

=== Section 7 ===
First round
(China) Tang Jiuhong	11	11
(Canada) Caroline Thorn	1	1
(Japan) Aiko Miyamura	11	11
(Australia) Amanda Hardy	8	1
(Netherlands) Astrid van der Knaap	11	11
(United States) Linda French	6	3
(Poland) Bożena Bąk	w.o.
(Nepal) Rajani Joshi Shrestha
(Malaysia) Lee Wai Leng	11	11
(Iceland) Guðrún Júlíusdóttir	7	3
(Denmark) Pernille Nedergaard Jessen	11	11
(Ukraine) Natalia Melnikova	0	2
(Hong Kong) Cheng Yin Sat	11	11
(Czech Republic) Markéta Koudelková	4	1
(Peru) Maria Theresa Montero	9	11	11
(Bulgaria) Emilia Dimitrova	11	5	8

Second round
(China) Tang Jiuhong	11	11	11
(Japan) Aiko Miyamura	5	12	4
(Netherlands) Astrid van der Knaap	11	11
(Poland) Bożena Bąk	8	1
(Malaysia) Lee Wai Leng	11	11
(Denmark) Pernille Nedergaard Jessen	6	8
(Hong Kong) Cheng Yin Sat	w.o.
(Peru) Maria Theresa Montero

Third round
(China) Tang Jiuhong	11	11
(Netherlands) Astrid van der Knaap	3	0
(Malaysia) Lee Wai Leng	11	11
(Hong Kong) Cheng Yin Sat	5	2

Fourth round
(China) Tang Jiuhong	11	11
(Malaysia) Lee Wai Leng	5	1

=== Section 8 ===
First round
(Indonesia) Sarwendah Kusumawardhani	11	11
(Scotland) Anne Gibson	3	8
(South Korea) Ra Kyung-min	11	11
(Germany) Katrin Schmidt	1	8
(Russia) Natalja Ivanova	11	11
(Sweden) Astrid Crabo	6	3
(New Zealand) Rhona Robertson	w.o.
(France) Christelle Mol
(China) Guo Jing	w.o.
(Poland) Marzena Lipińska
(England) Joanne Muggeridge	11	11
(Wales) Gail Osborne	2	0
(Austria) Irina Serova	w.o.
(Mozambique) Indira Marta Nal Bhika
(Finland) Susanna Kauhanen	w.o.
(Mexico) Zvetlana Serralde

Second round
(Indonesia) Sarwendah Kusumawardhani	11	12
(South Korea) Ra Kyung-min	7	10
(Russia) Natalja Ivanova	9	12	12
(New Zealand) Rhona Robertson	0	11	10
(China) Guo Jing	11	3	12
(England) Joanne Muggeridge	4	11	9
(Austria) Irina Serova	11	11
(Finland) Susanna Kauhanen	1	0

Third round
(Indonesia) Sarwendah Kusumawardhani	11	11
(Russia) Natalja Ivanova	2	5
(China) Guo Jing	11	5	11
(Austria) Irina Serova	4	11	4

Fourth round
(Indonesia) Sarwendah Kusumawardhani	12	11
(China) Guo Jing	11	0

== Final stage ==
Quarterfinals
(Indonesia) Susi Susanti	2	11	11
(South Korea) Lee Heung-soon	11	3	2
(China) Ye Zhaoying	11	11
(Thailand) Somharuthai Jaroensiri	5	4
(South Korea) Bang Soo-hyun	11	11
(China) Liu Yuhong	8	4
(China) Tang Jiuhong	2	11	11
(Indonesia) Sarwendah Kusumawardhani	11	8	1

Semifinals
(Indonesia) Susi Susanti	12	12
(China) Ye Zhaoying	10	10
(South Korea) Bang Soo-hyun	11	10	12
(China) Tang Jiuhong	3	12	10

Finals
(Indonesia) Susi Susanti	7	11	11
(South Korea) Bang Soo-hyun	11	9	3
