= 1986 Uber Cup qualification =

Tournament details
- Dates: 17 – 23 February 1986
- Location: Asian zone: Bangkok American zone: Vancouver European zone: Mülheim

The qualifying process for the 1986 Uber Cup took place from 17 to 23 February 1986 to decide the final teams which will play in the final tournament.

== Qualification process ==
The qualification process will be divided into three regions, the Asian Zone, the European Zone and the Pan American Zone. Teams in their respective zone will first compete in a round-robin elimination format. The top two teams will advance to the knockout stages to compete for a place in the final tournament to be held in Jakarta.

China qualified for the final tournament as defending champions while Indonesia qualified as hosts.

=== Qualified teams ===
Country	Qualified as	Qualified on	Final appearance
Indonesia	1986 Uber Cup hosts	27 May 1984	9th
China	1984 Uber Cup winners	17 May 1984	2nd
South Korea	Asian Zone winners	23 February 1986	2nd
Japan	Asian Zone runners-up	23 February 1986	7th
Denmark	European Zone winners	23 February 1986	6th
England	European Zone runners-up	23 February 1986	7th
Sweden	Third place in European Zone	23 February 1986	1st
Canada	American Zone winners	22 February 1986	8th

== Asian Zone ==
The qualification rounds for the Asian Zone were held from 17 to 22 February at the Nimibutr Stadium in Bangkok, Thailand. Eight teams took part in qualifying for the final tournament. Brunei withdrew from the tournament.

=== Group stage ===
==== Group A ====
Pos	Team	Pld	W	L	MF	MA	MD	Pts	Qualification
1	South Korea	3	3	0	14	1	+13	3	Advance to knockout stage
2	Malaysia	2	2	1	8	7	+1	2	Advance to knockout stage
3	India	2	1	2	8	7	+1	1	
4	Sri Lanka	3	0	3	0	15	−15	0	

Source: NewspaperSG

South Korea
5
Nimibutr Stadium
17 February 1986

Sri Lanka
0

		Result
1	Kim Yun-ja	2 – 0 (11–0, 11–0)	Imali Fernando
2	Yoo Sang-hee	2 – 0 (11–4, 11–1)	Sriyani Deepika
3	Chung So-young	2 – 0 (11–1, 11–1)	Yasintha Liyanage
4	Chung Myung-hee; Hwang Hye-young	2 – 0 (15–0, 15–2)	Kaushalya Dissanayake; Ranjani Seneviratne
5	Hwang Sun-ai; Kang Haeng-suk	2 – 0 (15–2, 15–1)	Jeniffer Jacob; Yasintha Liyanage

Malaysia
3
Nimibutr Stadium
18 February 1986

India
2

		Result
1	Juliet Poon	0 – 2 (5–11, 2–11)	Ami Ghia
2	Leong Chai Lean	2 – 0 (12–11, 11–3)	Madhumita Bisht
3	Tan Mei Chuan	2 – 0 (11–5, 11–7)	Seema Bhandari
4	Juliet Poon; Tan Sui Hoon	0 – 2 (7–15, 6–15)	Madhumita Bisht; Ami Ghia
5	Kok Chan Fong; Leong Chai Lean	2 – 0 (15–5, 15–7)	Mallika Barua; Deepti Thanekar

South Korea
5
Nimibutr Stadium
19 February 1986

Malaysia
0

		Result
1	Kim Yun-ja	2 – 0 (11–5, 11–1)	Juliet Poon
2	Hwang Hye-young	2 – 0 (11–2, 11–2)	Tan Mei Chuan
3	Chung So-young	2 – 0 (11–3, 11–2)	Kok Chan Fong
4	Hwang Sun-ai; Kim Yun-ja	2 – 0 (15–1, 15–2)	Leong Chai Lean; Wong Mei Ling
5	Chung Myung-hee; Hwang Hye-young	2 – 0 (15–2, 15–4)	Kok Chan Fong; Tan Sui Hoon

India
5
Nimibutr Stadium
19 February 1986

Sri Lanka
0

		Result
1	Ami Ghia	2 – 0 (11–1, 11–1)	Imali Fernando
2	Madhumita Bisht	2 – 0 (11–0, 11–1)	Sriyani Deepika
3	Seema Bhandari	2 – 0 (11–3, 11–0)	Yasintha Liyanage
4	Madhumita Bisht; Ami Ghia	2 – 0 (15–3, 15–4)	Kaushalya Dissanayake; Ranjani Seneviratne
5	Mallika Barua; Deepti Thanekar	2 – 0 (15–0, 15–2)	Jeniffer Jacob; Yasintha Liyanage

Malaysia
5
Nimibutr Stadium
21 February 1986

Sri Lanka
0

		Result
1	Juliet Poon	2 – 0 (11–2, 11–0)	Imali Fernando
2	Leong Chai Lean	2 – 0 (11–1, 11–1)	Sriyani Deepika
3	Tan Mei Chuan	2 – 0 (11–2, 11–3)	Yasintha Liyanage
4	Lee Wai Leng; Juliet Poon	2 – 0 (15–7, 15–2)	Kaushalya Dissanayake; Ranjani Seneviratne
5	Kok Chan Fong; Leong Chai Lean	2 – 0 (15–1, 15–1)	Jeniffer Jacob; Yasintha Liyanage

South Korea
4
Nimibutr Stadium
21 February 1986

India
1

		Result
1	Kim Yun-ja	2 – 0 (11–3, 11–1)	Ami Ghia
2	Hwang Hye-young	1 – 2 (9–11, 11–3, 8–11)	Madhumita Bisht
3	Lee Myung-hee	2 – 0 (11–7, 11–4)	Seema Bhandari
4	Kang Haeng-suk; Yoo Sang-hee	2 – 0 (15–3, 15–2)	Madhumita Bisht; Ami Ghia
5	Chung Myung-hee; Hwang Hye-young	2 – 0 (15–1, 15–2)	Mallika Barua; Deepti Thanekar

==== Group B ====
Pos	Team	Pld	W	L	MF	MA	MD	Pts	Qualification
1	Japan	3	3	0	15	0	+15	3	Advance to knockout stage
2	Thailand	2	2	1	9	6	+3	2	Advance to knockout stage
3	Australia	2	1	2	6	9	−3	1	
4	Hong Kong	3	0	3	0	15	−15	0	
5	Brunei	0	0	0	0	0	0	0	Withdrew

Source: NewspaperSG

Japan
5
Nimibutr Stadium
17 February 1986

Hong Kong
0

		Result
1	Sumiko Kitada	2 – 0 (11–5, 11–4)	Tong Chun Mui
2	Kimiko Jinnai	2 – 0 (11–0, 11–0)	Poon Wai Na
3	Yoshiko Yonekura	2 – 0 (11–1, 11–2)	Cheng Yin Sat
4	Sumiko Kitada; Harumi Kohara	2 – 0 (15–2, 15–3)	Chan Siu Chun; Tong Chun Mui
5	Kazue Hoshi; Kazuko Takamine	2 – 0 (15–1, 15–4)	Cheng Yin Sat; Poon Wai Na

Thailand
4
Nimibutr Stadium
18 February 1986

Australia
1

		Result
1	Darunee Lertvoralak	2 – 0 (11–7, 11–0)	Julie McDonald
2	Ladawan Mulasartsatorn	2 – 0 (11–2, 11–5)	Audrey Tuckey
3	Penpan Klangthamniem	2 – 0 (11–7, 11–8)	Tracey Small
4	Sasithorn Maneeratanaporn; Ladawan Mulasartsatorn	1 – 2 (15–3, 11–15, 4–15)	Julie McDonald; Audrey Tuckey
5	Amporn Kaitpituk; Darunee Lertvoralak	2 – 0 (18–16, 15–11)	Karen Jupp; Tracey Small

Japan
5
Nimibutr Stadium
19 February 1986

Australia
0

		Result
1	Sumiko Kitada	2 – 0 (11–4, 11–1)	Karen Jupp
2	Kimiko Jinnai	2 – 0 (11–5, 11–2)	Tracey Small
3	Yoshiko Yonekura	2 – 0 (11–0, 11–5)	Rhonda Cator
4	Sumiko Kitada; Harumi Kohara	2 – 0 (15–6, 15–8)	Julie McDonald; Audrey Tuckey
5	Kazue Hoshi; Kazuko Takamine	2 – 0 (15–9, 15–5)	Karen Jupp; Tracey Small

Thailand
5
Nimibutr Stadium
19 February 1986

Hong Kong
0

		Result
1	Jutatip Banjongsilp	2 – 0 (11–5, 11–2)	Tong Chun Mui
2	Darunee Lertvoralak	2 – 0 (11–2, 11–0)	Poon Wai Na
3	Ladawan Mulasartsatorn	2 – 0 (11–0, 11–3)	Chan Siu Chun
4	Amporn Kaitpituk; Penpan Klangthamniem	2 – 0 (15–7, 15–10)	Poon Wai Na; Tong Chun Mui
5	Jutatip Banjongsilp; Piyathip Sansaniyakulvilai	2 – 0 (15–8, 15–2)	Chan Siu Chun; Cheng Yin Sat

Japan
5
Nimibutr Stadium
21 February 1986

Thailand
0

		Result
1	Sumiko Kitada	2 – 0 (11–2, 11–5)	Jutatip Banjongsilp
2	Kimiko Jinnai	2 – 0 (11–3, 11–4)	Darunee Lertvoralak
3	Yoshiko Yonekura	2 – 0 (11–7, 11–2)	Ladawan Mulasartsatorn
4	Sumiko Kitada; Harumi Kohara	2 – 0 (15–7, 15–9)	Amporn Kaitpituk; Penpan Klangthamniem
5	Kazue Hoshi; Kazuko Takamine	2 – 0 (15–7, 18–15)	Darunee Lertvoralak; Ladawan Mulasartsatorn

Hong Kong
0
Nimibutr Stadium
21 February 1986

Australia
5

		Result
1	Tong Chun Mui	1 – 2 (8–11, 11–5, 2–11)	Julie McDonald
2	Poon Wai Na	0 – 2 (7–12, 9–12)	Tracey Small
3	Chan Siu Chun	0 – 2 (5–11, 6–11)	Rhonda Cator
4	Poon Wai Na; Tong Chun Mui	1 – 2 (15–12, 2–15, 8–15)	Julie McDonald; Audrey Tuckey
5	Chan Siu Chun; Cheng Yin Sat	0 – 2 (3–15, 0–15)	Karen Jupp; Tracey Small

=== Knockout stage ===
Semi-finals
South Korea	5
Thailand	0
Malaysia	1
Japan	4

Final
South Korea	4
Japan	1
Third place
Thailand	3
Malaysia	2

==== Semi-finals ====
South Korea
5
Nimibutr Stadium
22 February 1986

Thailand
0

		Result
1	Hwang Hye-young	2 – 1 (9–12, 11–4, 11–2)	Jutatip Banjongsilp
2	Yoo Sang-hee	2 – 0 (11–6, 11–6)	Darunee Lertvoralak
3	Lee Myung-hee	0 – 2 (7–11, 2–11)	Ladawan Mulasartsatorn
4	Hwang Sun-ai; Kang Haeng-suk	2 – 0 (15–6, 15–6)	Amporn Kaitpituk; Penpan Klangthamniem
5	Chung Myung-hee; Hwang Hye-young	2 – 0 (15–8, 15–5)	Darunee Lertvoralak; Ladawan Mulasartsatorn

Japan
4
Nimibutr Stadium
22 February 1986

Malaysia
1

		Result
1	Sumiko Kitada	2 – 0 (11–4, 11–3)	Juliet Poon
2	Kimiko Jinnai	1 – 2 (10–12, 11–2, 4–11)	Leong Chai Lean
3	Yoshiko Yonekura	2 – 1 (1–11, 11–3, 11–2)	Tan Mei Chuan
4	Sumiko Kitada; Harumi Kohara	2 – 0 (15–7, 15–8)	Juliet Poon; Tan Sui Hoon
5	Kazue Hoshi; Kazuko Takamine	2 – 0 (15–9, 15–7)	Kok Chan Fong; Leong Chai Lean

==== Third place ====
Thailand
3
Nimibutr Stadium
23 February 1986

Malaysia
2

		Result
1	Jutatip Banjongsilp	2 – 0 (12–9, 11–4)	Juliet Poon
2	Darunee Lertvoralak	2 – 0 (11–8, 11–4)	Leong Chai Lean
3	Ladawan Mulasartsatorn	2 – 0 (11–4, 11–1)	Tan Mei Chuan
4	Jutatip Banjongsilp; Penpan Klangthamniem	1 – 2 (13–18, 15–5, 6–15)	Juliet Poon; Tan Sui Hoon
5	Amporn Kaitpituk; Ladawan Mulasartsatorn	0 – 2 (16–18, 6–15)	Kok Chan Fong; Leong Chai Lean

==== Final ====
South Korea
4
Nimibutr Stadium
23 February 1986

Japan
1

		Result
1	Kim Yun-ja	2 – 0 (11–0, 11–3)	Sumiko Kitada
2	Hwang Sun-ai	2 – 0 (11–8, 11–6)	Kimiko Jinnai
3	Chung So-young	0 – 2 (6–11, 7–11)	Yoshiko Yonekura
4	Kim Yun-ja; Yoo Sang-hee	2 – 1 (9–15, 15–1, 15–6)	Sumiko Kitada; Harumi Kohara
5	Chung Myung-hee; Hwang Hye-young	2 – 0 (15–5, 15–8)	Kazue Hoshi; Kazuko Takamine

== European Zone ==
The European qualifying rounds were held in Sporthalle Mülheim an der Ruhr in Mülheim, West Germany. Eighteen teams took part in the qualifiers.

=== Group stage ===
==== Group A ====
Pos	Team	Pld	W	L	MF	MA	MD	Pts	Qualification
1	England	3	3	0	15	0	+15	3	Advance to knockout stage
2	West Germany	2	2	1	10	5	+5	2	
3	Ireland	2	1	2	3	12	−9	1	
4	Wales	3	0	3	2	13	−11	0	

Source: New Sunday Times

England
5
Sporthalle Mülheim an der Ruhr
19 February 1986

Ireland
0

		Result
1	Fiona Elliott	2 – 0	Ciara Doheny
2	Gillian Gowers	2 – 0	Ita Marron
3	Karen Beckman	2 – 0	Holly Lane
4	Karen Beckman; Sara Halsall	2 – 0	Ciara Doheny; Holly Lane
5	Gillian Gowers; Helen Troke	2 – 0	Elaine Doyle; Ita Marron

West Germany
5
Sporthalle Mülheim an der Ruhr
19 February 1986

Wales
0

		Result
1	Heidi Krickhaus	2 – 0	Lesley Roberts
2	Kirsten Schmieder	2 – 0	Denise Lewis
3	Katrin Schmidt	2 – 0	Cathy Vigar
4	Katrin Schmidt; Kirsten Schmieder	2 – 1	Sarah Doody; Lesley Roberts
5	Mechtild Hagemann; Cathrin Hoppe	2 – 1	Jane Banham; Claire Hybart

England
5
Sporthalle Mülheim an der Ruhr
19 February 1986

Wales
0

		Result
1	Helen Troke	2 – 0	Lesley Roberts
2	Fiona Elliott	2 – 0	Denise Lewis
3	Gillian Gowers	2 – 0	Cathy Vigar
4	Karen Beckman; Sara Halsall	2 – 0	Sarah Doody; Lesley Roberts
5	Gillian Clark; Gillian Gowers	2 – 0	Jane Banham; Claire Hybart

West Germany
5
Sporthalle Mülheim an der Ruhr
20 February 1986

Ireland
0

		Result
1	Heidi Krickhaus	2 – 0	Ciara Doheny
2	Kirsten Schmieder	2 – 0	Ita Marron
3	Katrin Schmidt	2 – 0	Holly Lane
4	Katrin Schmidt; Kirsten Schmieder	2 – 1	Ciara Doheny; Holly Lane
5	Mechtild Hagemann; Cathrin Hoppe	2 – 0	Elaine Doyle; Ita Marron

England
5
Sporthalle Mülheim an der Ruhr
21 February 1986

West Germany
0

		Result
1	Helen Troke	2 – 0	Heidi Krickhaus
2	Fiona Elliott	2 – 0	Kirsten Schmieder
3	Gillian Gowers	2 – 0	Christa Hökel
4	Karen Beckman; Sara Halsall	2 – 0	Katrin Schmidt; Kirsten Schmieder
5	Gillian Clark; Gillian Gowers	2 – 0	Mechtild Hagemann; Cathrin Hoppe

Ireland
3
Sporthalle Mülheim an der Ruhr
21 February 1986

Wales
2

		Result
1	Ciara Doheny	2 – 0 (11–6, 11–7)	Lesley Roberts
2	Ita Marron	2 – 0 (11–3, 11–5)	Denise Lewis
3	Holly Lane	2 – 0 (11–6, 11–4)	Cathy Vigar
4	Ciara Doheny; Holly Lane	1 – 2 (6–15, 15–11, 11–15)	Sarah Doody; Lesley Roberts
5	Elaine Doyle; Ita Marron	1 – 2 (15–8, 10–15, 9–15)	Jane Banham; Claire Hybart

==== Group B ====
Pos	Team	Pld	W	L	MF	MA	MD	Pts	Qualification
1	Sweden	4	4	0	20	0	+20	4	Advance to knockout stage
2	Scotland	3	3	1	15	5	+10	3	
3	Austria	3	2	2	10	10	0	2	
4	Switzerland	4	1	3	5	15	−10	1	
5	Zambia	4	0	4	0	20	−20	0	

Source: New Sunday Times

Sweden
5
Sporthalle Mülheim an der Ruhr
19 February 1986

Zambia
0

		Result
1	Christine Magnusson	2 – 0 (11–0, 11–0)	Josephine Chipepo
2	Charlotta Wihlborg	2 – 0 (11–0, 11–1)	Catherine Chisala
3	Maria Henning	2 – 0 (11–1, 11–1)	Aquinata Moya
4	Maria Bengtsson; Christine Magnusson	2 – 0 (15–0, 15–2)	Josephine Chipepo; Catherine Chisala
5	Anette Börjesson; Ann Sandersson	2 – 0 (15–0, 15–0)	Ethel Chola; Aquinata Moya

Scotland
5
Sporthalle Mülheim an der Ruhr
19 February 1986

Austria
0

		Result
1	Jennifer Allen	2 – 0 (11–6, 11–2)	Hertha Obritzhauser
2	Anne Gibson	2 – 0 (11–3, 11–5)	Sabine Ploner
3	Aileen Nairn	2 – 0 (11–1, 11–3)	Brigitte Lackner
4	Alison Fulton; Pamela Hamilton	2 – 0 (15–3, 18–16)	Hertha Obritzhauser; Brigitta Wastl
5	Elinor Allen; Jennifer Allen	2 – 0 (15–0, 15–1)	Birgit Gruber; Brigitte Lackner

Scotland
5
Sporthalle Mülheim an der Ruhr
19 February 1986

Switzerland
0

		Result
1	Pamela Hamilton	2 – 0 (11–3, 11–1)	Doris Gerstenkorn
2	Anne Gibson	2 – 0 (11–0, 11–2)	Catherine Jordan
3	Aileen Nairn	2 – 0 (11–1, 11–0)	Bettina Villars
4	Alison Fulton; Pamela Hamilton	2 – 0 (15–2, 15–1)	Catherine Jordan; Arlette Lüthi
5	Elinor Allen; Jennifer Allen	2 – 0 (15–8, 15–3)	Eliane Huldi; Bettina Villars

Austria
5
Sporthalle Mülheim an der Ruhr
19 February 1986

Zambia
0

		Result
1	Hertha Obritzhauser	2 – 0	Josephine Chipepo
2	Sabine Ploner	2 – 0	Catherine Chisala
3	Brigitte Lackner	2 – 0	Aquinata Moya
4	Hertha Obritzhauser; Brigitta Wastl	2 – 0	Josephine Chipepo; Catherine Chisala
5	Birgit Gruber; Brigitte Lackner	2 – 0	Ethel Chola; Aquinata Moya

Sweden
5
Sporthalle Mülheim an der Ruhr
20 February 1986

Austria
0

		Result
1	Christine Magnusson	2 – 0 (11–1, 11–0)	Hertha Obritzhauser
2	Charlotta Wihlborg	2 – 0 (11–2, 11–2)	Sabine Ploner
3	Maria Henning	2 – 0 (11–2, 11–4)	Brigitte Lackner
4	Maria Bengtsson; Christine Magnusson	2 – 0 (15–7, 15–5)	Hertha Obritzhauser; Sabine Ploner
5	Anette Börjesson; Ann Sandersson	2 – 0 (15–3, 15–6)	Birgit Gruber; Brigitte Lackner

Switzerland
5
Sporthalle Mülheim an der Ruhr
20 February 1986

Zambia
0

		Result
1	Doris Gerstenkorn	2 – 0	Josephine Chipepo
2	Bettina Villars	2 – 0	Catherine Chisala
3	Arlette Lüthi	2 – 0	Aquinata Moya
4	Catherine Jordan; Bettina Villars	2 – 0	Josephine Chipepo; Catherine Chisala
5	Eliane Huldi; Arlette Lüthi	2 – 0	Ethel Chola; Aquinata Moya

Scotland
5
Sporthalle Mülheim an der Ruhr
20 February 1986

Zambia
0

		Result
1	Jennifer Allen	2 – 0 (11–1, 11–2)	Josephine Chipepo
2	Pamela Hamilton	2 – 0 (11–1, 11–1)	Aquinata Moya
3	Anne Gibson	2 – 0 (11–2, 11–1)	Ethel Chola
4	Alison Fulton; Pamela Hamilton	2 – 0 (15–1, 15–2)	Josephine Chipepo; Aquinata Moya
5	Elinor Allen; Aileen Nairn	2 – 0 (15–2, 15–2)	Ethel Chola; Catherine Chisala

Sweden
5
Sporthalle Mülheim an der Ruhr
21 February 1986

Switzerland
0

		Result
1	Christine Magnusson	2 – 0	Doris Gerstenkorn
2	Charlotta Wihlborg	2 – 0	Catherine Jordan
3	Maria Henning	2 – 0	Bettina Villars
4	Maria Bengtsson; Christine Magnusson	2 – 0	Catherine Jordan; Arlette Lüthi
5	Anette Börjesson; Ann Sandersson	2 – 0	Eliane Huldi; Bettina Villars

Sweden
5
Sporthalle Mülheim an der Ruhr
21 February 1986

Scotland
0

		Result
1	Christine Magnusson	2 – 0 (11–6, 11–3)	Jennifer Allen
2	Charlotta Wihlborg	2 – 0 (11–5, 11–7)	Pamela Hamilton
3	Maria Henning	2 – 0 (12–9, 11–6)	Anne Gibson
4	Maria Bengtsson; Christine Magnusson	2 – 0 (15–8, 15–12)	Alison Fulton; Pamela Hamilton
5	Anette Börjesson; Ann Sandersson	2 – 0 (15–11, 15–10)	Elinor Allen; Jennifer Allen

Austria
5
Sporthalle Mülheim an der Ruhr
21 February 1986

Switzerland
0

		Result
1	Hertha Obritzhauser	2 – 0	Doris Gerstenkorn
2	Sabine Ploner	2 – 1	Catherine Jordan
3	Brigitte Lackner	2 – 1	Bettina Villars
4	Hertha Obritzhauser; Brigitta Wastl	2 – 0	Catherine Jordan; Arlette Lüthi
5	Birgit Gruber; Brigitte Lackner	2 – 1	Eliane Huldi; Bettina Villars

==== Group C ====
Pos	Team	Pld	W	L	MF	MA	MD	Pts	Qualification
1	Netherlands	4	4	0	18	2	+16	4	Advance to knockout stage
2	Soviet Union	4	3	1	17	3	+14	3	
3	Norway	4	2	2	7	13	−6	2	
4	Iceland	4	1	3	7	13	−6	1	
5	France	4	0	4	1	19	−18	0	

Source: New Sunday Times

Norway
4
Sporthalle Mülheim an der Ruhr
19 February 1986

France
1

		Result
1	Ellen Berg	2 – 0	Cécilia Brun
2	Marianne Wikdal	2 – 0	Roselyne Fon Sing
3	Gro Storvik	2 – 0	Christine Latour
4	Ellen Berg; Sissel Svestad	0 – 2	Cécilia Brun; Roselyne Fon Sing
5	Gro Storvik; Marianne Wikdal	2 – 0	Christine Latour; Corinne Sonnet

Soviet Union
5
Sporthalle Mülheim an der Ruhr
19 February 1986

Iceland
0

		Result
1	Svetlana Beliasova	2 – 0	Þórdís Edwald
2	Vlada Belyutina	2 – 0	Elisabet Þórðardóttir
3	Elena Rybkina	2 – 0	Inga Kjartansdóttir
4	Svetlana Beliasova; Elena Rybkina	2 – 0	Þórdís Edwald; Elisabet Þórðardóttir
5	Tatyana Litvinenko; Viktoria Pron	2 – 0	Inga Kjartansdóttir; Kristín Kristjánsdóttir

Netherlands
5
Sporthalle Mülheim an der Ruhr
19 February 1986

France
0

		Result
1	Astrid van der Knaap	2 – 0 (11–0, 11–0)	Cécilia Brun
2	Erica van Dijck	2 – 0 (11–0, 11–0)	Roselyne Fon Sing
3	Marjan Ridder	2 – 0 (11–1, 11–1)	Christine Latour
4	Astrid van der Knaap; Karin van der Valk	2 – 0 (15–0, 15–2)	Cécilia Brun; Roselyne Fon Sing
5	Marjan Ridder; Erica van Dijck	2 – 1 (15–2, 15–0)	Christine Latour; Corinne Sonnet

Soviet Union
5
Sporthalle Mülheim an der Ruhr
19 February 1986

Norway
0

		Result
1	Svetlana Beliasova	2 – 0	Ellen Berg
2	Vlada Belyutina	2 – 0	Gro Storvik
3	Elena Rybkina	2 – 0	Marianne Wikdal
4	Svetlana Beliasova; Elena Rybkina	2 – 0	Ellen Berg; Sissel Svestad
5	Tatyana Litvinenko; Viktoria Pron	2 – 0	Gry Kirsti Solberg; Marianne Wikdal

Netherlands
5
Sporthalle Mülheim an der Ruhr
20 February 1986

Iceland
0

		Result
1	Eline Coene	2 – 0 (11–4, 11–2)	Þórdís Edwald
2	Astrid van der Knaap	2 – 0 (11–8, 12–10)	Elisabet Þórðardóttir
3	Erica van Dijck	2 – 0 (11–3, 11–1)	Ása Pálsdóttir
4	Eline Coene; Erica van Dijck	2 – 0 (15–8, 15–3)	Þórdís Edwald; Inga Kjartansdóttir
5	Astrid van der Knaap; Karin van der Valk	2 – 0 (15–1, 15–2)	Kristín Kristjánsdóttir; Elisabet Þórðardóttir

Netherlands
5
Sporthalle Mülheim an der Ruhr
20 February 1986

Norway
0

		Result
1	Astrid van der Knaap	2 – 0 (11–3, 11–2)	Ellen Berg
2	Marjan Ridder	2 – 0 (11–0, 11–2)	Gro Storvik
3	Erica van Dijck	2 – 0 (11–5, 11–3)	Marianne Wikdal
4	Eline Coene; Erica van Dijck	2 – 0 (15–3, 15–4)	Sissel Svestad; Marianne Wikdal
5	Astrid van der Knaap; Karin van der Valk	2 – 0 (15–9, 15–4)	Gro Storvik; Gry Kirsti Solberg

Iceland
5
Sporthalle Mülheim an der Ruhr
20 February 1986

France
0

		Result
1	Þórdís Edwald	2 – 0	Cécilia Brun
2	Elisabet Þórðardóttir	2 – 0	Roselyne Fon Sing
3	Ása Pálsdóttir	2 – 1	Christine Latour
4	Þórdís Edwald; Inga Kjartansdóttir	2 – 1	Cécilia Brun; Roselyne Fon Sing
5	Kristín Kristjánsdóttir; Elisabet Þórðardóttir	2 – 0	Christine Latour; Corinne Sonnet

Soviet Union
5
Sporthalle Mülheim an der Ruhr
21 February 1986

France
0

		Result
1	Svetlana Beliasova	2 – 0	Cécilia Brun
2	Tatyana Litvinenko	2 – 0	Roselyne Fon Sing
3	Vlada Belyutina	2 – 0	Corinne Sonnet
4	Svetlana Beliasova; Elena Rybkina	2 – 0	Cécilia Brun; Roselyne Fon Sing
5	Tatyana Litvinenko; Viktoria Pron	2 – 0	Christine Latour; Christine Latour

Netherlands
3
Sporthalle Mülheim an der Ruhr
21 February 1986

Soviet Union
2

		Result
1	Eline Coene	2 – 1 (7–11, 11–5, 11–3)	Svetlana Beliasova
2	Astrid van der Knaap	0 – 2 (8–11, 6–11)	Tatyana Litvinenko
3	Erica van Dijck	2 – 0 (4–11, 11–7, 11–8)	Vlada Belyutina
4	Eline Coene; Erica van Dijck	2 – 0 (8–15, 15–7, 15–11)	Svetlana Beliasova; Elena Rybkina
5	Astrid van der Knaap; Karin van der Valk	1 – 2 (10–15, 15–11, 8–15)	Tatyana Litvinenko; Viktoria Pron

Norway
3
Sporthalle Mülheim an der Ruhr
21 February 1986

Iceland
2

		Result
1	Ellen Berg	0 – 2	Þórdís Edwald
2	Marianne Wikdal	2 – 0	Elisabet Þórðardóttir
3	Gro Storvik	2 – 0	Inga Kjartansdóttir
4	Ellen Berg; Sissel Svestad	0 – 2	Þórdís Edwald; Elisabet Þórðardóttir
5	Gry Kirsti Solberg; Marianne Wikdal	2 – 0	Inga Kjartansdóttir; Kristín Kristjánsdóttir

==== Group D ====
Pos	Team	Pld	W	L	MF	MA	MD	Pts	Qualification
1	Denmark	3	3	0	15	0	+15	3	Advance to knockout stage
2	Poland	3	2	1	8	7	+1	2	
3	Belgium	3	1	2	5	10	−5	1	
4	Finland	3	0	3	2	13	−11	0	
5	Nigeria	0	0	0	0	0	0	0	Withdrew

Source: New Sunday Times

Belgium
2
Sporthalle Mülheim an der Ruhr
19 February 1986

Poland
3

		Result
1	Ingrid Swiggers	2 – 0	Bożena Siemieniec
2	Annick Bouquiaux	1 – 2	Bożena Haracz
3	Marie-Christine Donnay	1 – 2	Ewa Wilman
4	Ingrid Swiggers; Greet van Haverbeke	2 – 0	Ewa Wilman; Zofia Żółtańska
5	Annick Bouquiaux; Nancy de Mey	1 – 2	Bożena Haracz; Bożena Siemieniec

Denmark
5
Sporthalle Mülheim an der Ruhr
19 February 1986

Finland
0

		Result
1	Christina Bostofte	2 – 0 (11–0, 11–4)	Nina Sundberg
2	Charlotte Hattens	2 – 0 (11–0, 11–0)	Christina von Pfaler
3	Lisbet Stuer-Lauridsen	2 – 0 (11–1, 11–1)	Susanna Dahlberg
4	Dorte Kjær; Nettie Nielsen	2 – 0 (15–4, 15–4)	Pia Pajunen; Nina Sundberg
5	Grete Mogensen; Gitte Paulsen	2 – 0 (15–0, 15–1)	Susanna Dahlberg; Christina von Pfaler

Belgium
3
Sporthalle Mülheim an der Ruhr
19 February 1986

Finland
2

		Result
1	Ingrid Swiggers	2 – 1	Nina Sundberg
2	Nancy de Mey	0 – 2	Pia Pajunen
3	Annick Bouquiaux	2 – 1	Ulrika von Pfaler
4	Ingrid Swiggers; Greet van Haverbeke	2 – 0	Pia Pajunen; Nina Sundberg
5	Annick Bouquiaux; Marie-Christine Donnay	1 – 2	Christina von Pfaler; Ulrika von Pfaler

Poland
5
Sporthalle Mülheim an der Ruhr
20 February 1986

Finland
0

		Result
1	Bożena Siemieniec	2 – 0	Nina Sundberg
2	Bożena Haracz	2 – 0	Pia Pajunen
3	Zofia Żółtańska	2 – 1	Ulrika von Pfaler
4	Bożena Siemieniec; Zofia Żółtańska	2 – 1	Pia Pajunen; Nina Sundberg
5	Bożena Haracz; Ewa Wilman	2 – 1	Christina von Pfaler; Ulrika von Pfaler

Denmark
5
Sporthalle Mülheim an der Ruhr
20 February 1986

Poland
0

		Result
1	Kirsten Larsen	2 – 0	Bożena Siemieniec
2	Christina Bostofte	2 – 0	Bożena Haracz
3	Charlotte Hattens	2 – 0	Ewa Wilman
4	Dorte Kjær; Nettie Nielsen	2 – 0	Bożena Siemieniec; Zofia Żółtańska
5	Grete Mogensen; Gitte Paulsen	2 – 0	Bożena Haracz; Ewa Wilman

Denmark
5
Sporthalle Mülheim an der Ruhr
21 February 1986

Belgium
0

		Result
1	Christina Bostofte	2 – 0 (11–3, 11–0)	Sabine Langenaekens
2	Charlotte Hattens	2 – 0 (11–1, 11–0)	Annick Bouquiaux
3	Dorte Kjær	2 – 0 (11–5, 11–0)	Greet van Haverbeke
4	Grete Mogensen; Gitte Paulsen	2 – 0 (15–2, 15–7)	Ingrid Swiggers; Greet van Haverbeke
5	Nettie Nielsen; Lisbet Stuer-Lauridsen	2 – 0 (15–1, 15–7)	Annick Bouquiaux; Sabine Langenaekens

=== Knockout stage ===
Semi-finals
England	4
Sweden	1
Netherlands	0
Denmark	5

Final
England	3
Denmark	2
Third place
Sweden	3
Netherlands	2

==== Semi-finals ====
England
4
Sporthalle Mülheim an der Ruhr
22 February 1986

Sweden
1

		Result
1	Helen Troke	2 – 0 (11–6, 11–8)	Christine Magnusson
2	Fiona Elliott	1 – 1 (11–12, 11–5, 5^{r}–8)	Charlotta Wihlborg
3	Gillian Gowers	2 – 1 (11–8, 6–11, 11–3)	Maria Henning
4	Karen Beckman; Sara Halsall	2 – 1 (7–15, 17–14, 17–15)	Maria Bengtsson; Christine Magnusson
5	Gillian Gowers; Helen Troke	2 – 0 (18–16, 15–6)	Anette Börjesson; Ann Sandersson

Denmark
5
Sporthalle Mülheim an der Ruhr
22 February 1986

Netherlands
0

		Result
1	Kirsten Larsen	2 – 1 (4–11, 11–4, 11–2)	Eline Coene
2	Christina Bostofte	2 – 0 (11–4, 11–2)	Astrid van der Knaap
3	Charlotte Hattens	2 – 0 (11–1, 11–1)	Monique Hoogland
4	Dorte Kjær; Kirsten Larsen	2 – 1 (15–9, 11–15, 15–1)	Eline Coene; Erica van Dijck
5	Grete Mogensen; Gitte Paulsen	2 – 0 (15–9, 15–12)	Astrid van der Knaap; Karin van der Valk

==== Third place ====
Sweden
3
Sporthalle Mülheim an der Ruhr
23 February 1986

Netherlands
2

		Result
1	Christine Magnusson	2 – 1 (11–7, 11–7)	Eline Coene
2	Maria Henning	2 – 0 (12–10, 11–7)	Monique Hoogland
3	Ann Sandersson	1 – 2 (11–7, 5–11, 6–11)	Erica van Dijck
4	Maria Bengtsson; Christine Magnusson	2 – 1 (15–17, 17–16, 15–11)	Eline Coene; Erica van Dijck
5	Anette Börjesson; Ann Sandersson	1 – 2 (9–15, 17–16, 8–15)	Astrid van der Knaap; Karin van der Valk

==== Final ====
England
3
Sporthalle Mülheim an der Ruhr
23 February 1986

Denmark
2

		Result
1	Helen Troke	0 – 2 (3–11, 9–12)	Kirsten Larsen
2	Fiona Elliott	2 – 0 (11–6, 11–4)	Christina Bostofte
3	Gillian Gowers	0 – 2 (11–12, 7–11)	Charlotte Hattens
4	Karen Beckman; Sara Halsall	2 – 1 (11–15, 15–12, 15–9)	Dorte Kjær; Nettie Nielsen
5	Gillian Gowers; Helen Troke	2 – 0 (15–8, 15–4)	Grete Mogensen; Gitte Paulsen

== Pan American Zone ==
The qualifying rounds for the Pan American zone were held at the Vancouver Racquets Club in Vancouver, Canada. Six teams competed in qualifying for the final tournament.

=== Group stage ===
==== Group A ====
Pos	Team	Pld	W	L	MF	MA	MD	Pts	Qualification
1	Canada	2	2	0	10	0	+10	2	Advance to knockout stage
2	Peru	2	1	1	5	5	0	1	Advance to knockout stage
3	Jamaica	2	0	2	0	10	−10	0	

Source: The Straits Times

Canada
5
Vancouver Racquets Club
19 February 1986

Jamaica
0

		Result
1	Denyse Julien	2 – 0 (11–1, 11–0)	Maria Leyow
2	Linda Cloutier	2 – 0 (11–0, 11–0)	Deborah Binns
3	Claire Allison	2 – 0 (11–1, 11–0)	Terry Leyow
4	Johanne Falardeau; Denyse Julien	2 – 0 (15–0, 15–3)	Deborah Binns; Maria Leyow
5	Claire Sharpe; Sandra Skillings	2 – 0 (15–0, 15–1)	Terry Leyow; Juanita Moore

Canada
5
Vancouver Racquets Club
20 February 1986

Peru
0

		Result
1	Claire Sharpe	2 – 0 (11–5, 11–0)	Gloria Jiménez
2	Denyse Julien	2 – 0 (11–1, 11–4)	Maria Theresa Montero
3	Linda Cloutier	2 – 0 (11–8, 11–0)	Ximena Bellido
4	Johanne Falardeau; Denyse Julien	2 – 0 (15–2, 15–5)	Gloria Jiménez; Silvia Jiménez
5	Claire Sharpe; Sandra Skillings	2 – 0 (15–9, 15–3)	Carmen Bellido; Ximena Bellido

Peru
5
Vancouver Racquets Club
21 February 1986

Jamaica
0

		Result
1	Gloria Jiménez	2 – 1 (10–12, 11–6, 12–10)	Maria Leyow
2	Maria Theresa Montero	2 – 0 (11–4, 11–0)	Deborah Binns
3	Ximena Bellido	2 – 0 (11–0, 11–2)	Terry Leyow
4	Gloria Jiménez; Silvia Jiménez	2 – 1 (15–7, 9–15, 15–8)	Deborah Binns; Maria Leyow
5	Carmen Bellido; Ximena Bellido	2 – 0 (15–4, 15–2)	Terry Leyow; Juanita Moore

==== Group B ====
Pos	Team	Pld	W	L	MF	MA	MD	Pts	Qualification
1	Chinese Taipei	2	2	0	10	0	+10	2	Advance to knockout stage
2	New Zealand	2	1	1	5	5	0	1	Advance to knockout stage
3	United States	2	0	2	2	10	−8	0	

Source: The Straits Times

Chinese Taipei
5
Vancouver Racquets Club
19 February 1986

New Zealand
0

		Result
1	Lee Chien-mei	2 – 0 (12–9, 11–2)	Toni Whittaker
2	Feng Mei-ying	2 – 0 (11–6, 11–6)	Katrin Lockey
3	Lee Yi-hsia	2 – 0 (11–6, 11–4)	Jane Clarke
4	Lee Chien-mei; Lee Yi-hsia	2 – 0 (15–7, 15–7)	Toni Whittaker; Sandra Henare
5	Feng Mei-ying; Kang Chia-i	2 – 0 (15–9, 15–3)	Katrin Lockey; Jane Clarke

Chinese Taipei
5
Vancouver Racquets Club
20 February 1986

United States
0

		Result
1	Lee Chien-mei	2 – 0 (11–2, 11–3)	Joy Kitzmiller
2	Feng Mei-ying	2 – 0 (12–9, 11–0)	Pam Owens
3	Kang Chia-i	2 – 0 (11–0, 11–8)	Linda French
4	Lee Chien-mei; Lee Yi-hsia	2 – 0 (15–2, 15–5)	Judianne Kelly; Nina Loik
5	Feng Mei-ying; Kang Chia-i	2 – 0 (15–9, 15–3)	Traci Britton; Monica Ortez

United States
2
Vancouver Racquets Club
21 February 1986

New Zealand
3

		Result
1	Joy Kitzmiller	0 – 2 (2–11, 5–11)	Toni Whittaker
2	Pam Owens	0 – 2 (3–11, 0–11)	Katrin Lockey
3	Meiling Okuno	2 – 0 (11–9, 11–8)	Jane Clarke
4	Traci Britton; Joy Kitzmiller	1 – 2 (17–15, 12–15, 12–15)	Julie Still; Toni Whittaker
5	Judianne Kelly; Nina Loik	2 – 0 (15–9, 15–9)	Jane Clarke; Katrin Lockey

=== Knockout stage ===
Semi-finals
Canada	5
New Zealand	0
Peru	0
Chinese Taipei	5

Final
Canada	3
Chinese Taipei	2
Third place
New Zealand	3
Peru	2

==== Semi-finals ====
Canada
5
Vancouver Racquets Club
22 February 1986

New Zealand
0

		Result
1	Claire Sharpe	2 – 0 (11–1, 11–2)	Toni Whittaker
2	Denyse Julien	2 – 0 (11–0, 11–0)	Katrin Lockey
3	Linda Cloutier	2 – 0 (11–4, 11–1)	Jane Clarke
4	Johanne Falardeau; Sandra Skillings	2 – 0 (15–7, 15–8)	Toni Whittaker; Sandra Henare
5	Chantal Jobin; Doris Piché	2 – 0 (18–14, 15–10)	Katrin Lockey; Jane Clarke

Chinese Taipei
5
Vancouver Racquets Club
22 February 1986

Peru
0

		Result
1	Lee Chien-mei	2 – 0 (11–3, 11–5)	Gloria Jiménez
2	Feng Mei-ying	2 – 0 (11–1, 11–0)	Maria Theresa Montero
3	Chen Yu-jen	2 – 0 (11–3, 11–1)	Ximena Bellido
4	Lee Chien-mei; Lee Yi-hsia	2 – 0 (15–8, 15–6)	Gloria Jiménez; Silvia Jiménez
5	Feng Mei-ying; Kang Chia-i	2 – 0 (15–4, 15–7)	Carmen Bellido; Ximena Bellido

==== Third place ====
Peru
2
Vancouver Racquets Club
22 February 1986

New Zealand
3

		Result
1	Gloria Jiménez	2 – 0 (11–9, 11–8)	Toni Whittaker
2	Maria Theresa Montero	1 – 2 (12–9, 3–11, 4–11)	Katrin Lockey
3	Silvia Jiménez	2 – 0 (11–4, 11–2)	Jane Clarke
4	Gloria Jiménez; Silvia Jiménez	1 – 2 (6–15, 15–13, 13–18)	Toni Whittaker; Sandra Henare
5	Carmen Bellido; Ximena Bellido	0 – 2 (12–15, 3–15)	Katrin Lockey; Jane Clarke

==== Final ====
Canada
3
Vancouver Racquets Club
22 February 1986

Chinese Taipei
2

		Result
1	Claire Sharpe	1 – 2 (10–12, 11–7, 9–11)	Lee Chien-mei
2	Denyse Julien	2 – 0 (11–5, 11–2)	Feng Mei-ying
3	Linda Cloutier	1 – 2 (4–11, 11–9, 5–11)	Kang Chia-i
4	Denyse Julien; Johanne Falardeau	2 – 0 (15–4, 15–4)	Lee Chien-mei; Lee Yi-hsia
5	Claire Sharpe; Sandra Skillings	2 – 0 (15–11, 17–14)	Feng Mei-ying; Kang Chia-i
