= Hungarian National Badminton Championships =

The Hungarian National Badminton Championships is a tournament organized to crown the best badminton players in Hungary.

The tournament started in 1960 and is held every year.

== Past winners ==
Year	Men's singles	Women's singles	Men's doubles	Women's doubles	Mixed doubles
1960	Pál Rázsó	Endrene Komjatszegi	no competition		
1961	György Rázsó	no competition			
1962	Pál Rázsó	no competition			
1963	József Szepesi	Éva Szűcs	Pál Rázsó; György Rázsó	Lídia Horváth; Istvánné Marincsák	Pál Rázsó; Vera Juhász
1964	Pál Rázsó	Éva Ráduly	Pál Rázsó; György Rázsó	Éva Szűcs; Éva Schmitt	György Rázsó; Györgyné Rázsó
1965	György Rázsó	Katalin Jászonyi	Pál Rázsó; György Rázsó	Katalin Jászonyi; Irén Geblusek	Ferenc Jászonyi; Katalin Jászonyi
1966	János Cserni	Katalin Jászonyi	János Cserni; Zsolt Vajna	Katalin Jászonyi; Renáta Doba	János Cserni; Katalin Jászonyi
1967	János Cserni	Katalin Jászonyi	János Cserni; Ferenc Jaszonyi	Katalin Jászonyi; Erzsébet Wolf	János Cserni; Katalin Jászonyi
1968	János Cserni	Katalin Jászonyi	János Cserni; Tamás Szulyovszky	Katalin Jászonyi; Éva Cserni	János Cserni; Eleonóra Gedô
1969	János Cserni	Éva Cserni	András Édes; Péter Majerszky	Éva Cserni; Erzsébet Wolf	Tamás Szulyovszky; Valéria Virágos
1970	János Cserni	Éva Cserni	János Cserni; Tamás Szulyovszky	Valéria Virágos; Erzsébet Andrekovics	János Cserni; Éva Cserni
1971	János Cserni	Éva Cserni	Tamás Szulyovszky; Ferenc Rolek	Gertrúd Ladányi; Erzsébet Wolf	András Édes; Erzsébet Wolf
1972	János Cserni	Éva Cserni	András Édes; József Papp	Gertrúd Ladányi; Erzsébet Wolf	András Édes; Erzsébet Wolf
1973	János Cserni	Éva Cserni	János Cserni; László Rammer	Éva Cserni; Valéria Virágos	János Cserni; Éva Cserni
1974	János Cserni	Éva Cserni	János Cserni; László Rammer	Éva Cserni; Valéria Virágos	János Cserni; Éva Cserni
1975	István Englert	Erzsébet Németh	János Cserni; László Rammer	Erzsébet Németh; Ildikó Szabó	János Cserni; Éva Cserni
1976	Imre Bereknyei	Éva Cserni	István Englert; József Papp	Erzsébet Németh; Ildikó Szabó	János Cserni; Éva Cserni
1977	Imre Bereknyei	Éva Cserni	István Englert; József Papp	Éva Cserni; Éva Pozsik	János Cserni; Éva Cserni
1978	Imre Bereknyei	Ildikó Bödecs	István Englert; József Papp	Zsuzsa Gláser; Andrea Legerszki	József Papp; Éva Pozsik
1979	Imre Bereknyei	Zsuzsa Gláser	Imre Bereknyei; Ferenc Rolek	Éva Varga; Éva Pozsik	Ferenc Rolek; Éva Varga
1980	István Englert	Ildikó Vígh	István Englert; József Papp	Zsuzsa Gláser; Andrea Legerszki	Ferenc Rolek; Ildikó Vígh
1981	György Vörös	Ildikó Vígh	György Vörös; Ferenc Rolek	Ildikó Vígh; Zsuzsa Diószegi	György Vörös; Zsuzsa Diószegi
1982	György Vörös	Éva Varga (Cserni)	György Vörös; Ferenc Rolek	Ildikó Vígh; Zsuzsa Diószegi	György Vörös; Zsuzsa Diószegi
1983	György Vörös	Erzsébet Németh	György Vörös; Gábor Petrovits	Ildikó Vígh; Judit Fejes	György Vörös; Ildikó Vígh
1984	György Vörös	Ildikó Vígh	György Vörös; Gábor Petrovits	Éva Varga; Marta Petrovits	György Vörös; Ildikó Vígh
1985	Gábor Petrovits	Ildikó Vígh	György Vörös; Gábor Petrovits	Ildikó Vígh; Judit Fejes	György Vörös; Ildikó Vígh
1986	György Vörös	Ildikó Vígh	Csaba Kiss; Istvan Englert	Marta Dovalovszki; Éva Varga	Attila Nagy; Márta Dovalovszki
1987	Tamás Gebhard	Márta Dovalovszki	György Vörös; Gábor Petrovits	Márta Dovalovszki; Éva Varga	György Vörös; Judit Fejes
1988	Gábor Petrovits	Andrea Harsági	Gábor Petrovits; Attila Nagy	Márta Dovalovszki; Éva Varga	Attila Nagy; Márta Dovalovszki
1989	Gábor Petrovits	Csilla Fórián	Tamás Gebhard; Attila Nagy	Ildiko Vigh; Judit Fejes	Csaba Kiss; Csilla Fórián
1990	Attila Nagy	Andrea Harsági	Sandor Klein; Csaba Beleczki	Csilla Fórián; Andrea Dakó	Attila Nagy; Csilla Fórián
1991	Attila Nagy	Andrea Harsági	Tamás Gebhard; Attila Nagy	Ildiko Vigh; Andrea Dakó	György Vörös; Andrea Dakó
1992	Tamás Gebhard	Andrea Dakó	Richard Banhidi; Attila Nagy	Csilla Fórián; Kinga Karácsony	György Vörös; Andrea Dakó
1993	Richard Bánhidi	Andrea Harsági	Richard Bánhidi; Attila Nagy	Csilla Fórián; Kinga Karácsony	Richard Bánhidi; Csilla Fórián
1994	Gyula Szalai	Andrea Harsági	Gyula Szalai; György Vörös	Andrea Harsági; Andrea Dakó	György Vörös; Andrea Ódor
1995	Richard Bánhidi	Andrea Harsági	Zsolt Kocsis; Ákos Károlyi	Csilla Fórián; Kinga Karacsony	Gyula Szalai; Andrea Ódor
1996	Richard Bánhidi	Adrienn Kocsis	Richard Bánhidi; Attila Nagy	Adrienn Kocsis; Andrea Dakó	Gyula Szalai; Csilla Fórián
1997	Richard Bánhidi	Csilla Fórián	Richard Bánhidi; Attila Nagy	Adrienn Kocsis; Csilla Fórián	Gyula Szalai; Csilla Fórián
1998	Gyula Szalai	Melinda Keszthelyi	Gyula Szalai; Zsolt Kocsis	Andrea Dakó; Melinda Keszthelyi	Richard Bánhidi; Csilla Fórián
1999	Attila Kovács	Andrea Ódor	Ákos Károlyi; Richard Bánhidi	Andrea Dakó; Melinda Keszthelyi	Ákos Károlyi; Csilla Fórián
2000	Kristóf Horváth	Krisztina Ádám	Balázs Szabó; Csaba Retkes	Csilla Forian; Kinga Karacsony	Richard Bánhidi; Andrea Dakó
2001	Levente Csiszér	Krisztina Ádám	Zsolt Kocsis; Ákos Károlyi	Krisztina Ádám; Csilla Fórián	Ákos Károlyi; Csilla Fórián
2002	Levente Csiszér	Krisztina Ádám	Levente Csiszér; Teofil Tóth	Krisztina Ádám; Sarolta Varga	Richard Bánhidi; Csilla Fórián
2003	Levente Csiszér	Krisztina Ádám	Levente Csiszér; Ákos Károlyi	Csilla Fórián; Kinga Karácsony	Levente Csiszér; Csilla Fórián
2004	Kristóf Horváth	Krisztina Ádám	Henrik Tóth; Attila Kaposi	Zsófia Kovács; Zsuzsa Kovács	Levente Csiszér; Csilla Fórián
2005	Levente Csiszér	Sarolta Varga	Levente Csiszér; Richárd Bánhidi	Csilla Fórián; Zsuzsa Czifra	Levente Csiszér; Zsuzsa Kovács
2006	Attila Kaposi	Csilla Gondáné Fórián	András Sinka; Csaba Szikra	Csilla Gondáné Fórián; Zsuzsa Czifra	Csaba Retkes; Gabriella Papp
2007	Henrik Tóth	Krisztina Ádám	Kristóf Horváth; Csaba Retkes	Sarolta Varga; Orsolya Varga	Csaba Szikra; Krisztina Ádám
2008	Henrik Tóth	Sarolta Varga	Dávid Sárosi; András Németh	Melinda Keszthelyi; Krisztina Ádám	Kristóf Horváth; Melinda Keszthelyi
2009	Henrik Tóth	Orsolya Varga	Kristóf Horváth; Henrik Tóth	Melinda Keszthelyi; Krisztina Ádám	Csaba Szikra; Krisztina Ádám
2010	Henrik Tóth	Orsolya Varga	Kristóf Horváth; Henrik Tóth	Melinda Keszthelyi; Krisztina Ádám	Henrik Tóth; Zsuzsa Kovács
2011	Henrik Tóth	Orsolya Varga	András Németh; Henrik Tóth	Sára Fekete; Zsófia Horváth	Ákos Varga; Orsolya Varga
2012	Henrik Tóth	Orsolya Varga	András Németh; Henrik Tóth	Réka Sárosi; Laura Sárosi	Henrik Tóth; Sára Fekete
2013	Henrik Tóth	Laura Sárosi	Marcell Elek; Márton Szatzker	Laura Sárosi; Réka Sárosi	Henrik Tóth; Laura Sárosi
2014	Gergely Krausz	Laura Sárosi	Gergely Kraus; Márton Szatzker	Laura Sárosi; Réka Sárosi	Gergely Krausz; Laura Sárosi
2015	Gergely Krausz	Laura Sárosi	Gergely Kraus; Márton Szatzker	Laura Sárosi; Réka Sárosi	Gergely Krausz; Laura Sárosi
2016	Gergely Krausz	Laura Sárosi	Gergely Kraus; Márton Szatzker	Ágnes Kőrösi; Orsolya Varga	Gergely Krausz; Nikoletta Bukoviczki
2017	Gergely Krausz	Vivien Sándorházi	Gergely Kraus; Gergő Pytel	Réka Madarász; Nikoletta Bukoviczki	András Piliszky; Vivien Sándorházi
2018	Gergely Krausz	Réka Madarász	Gergely Kraus; Gergő Pytel	Ágnes Kőrösi; Krisztina Ádám	József Mester; Orsolya Varga
2019	Gergely Krausz	Vivien Sándorházi	Gergely Kraus; Dániel Gradwohl	Daniella Gonda; Nikoletta Bukoviczki	Kristóf Horváth; Vivien Sándorházi
2020	Gergő Pytel	Vivien Sándorházi	Zoltán Kereszti; József Mester	Daniella Gonda; Ágnes Kőrösi	Bene Benjamin Kiss; Réka Madarász
2021	Gergely Krausz	Laura Sárosi	Gergely Krausz; Gergő Pytel	Daniella Gonda; Ágnes Kőrösi	András Piliszky; Laura Sárosi
2022	Gergő Pytel	Vivien Sándorházi	Zoltán Kereszti; József Mester	Bianka Bukoviczki; Fanni Kiss	Kristóf Horváth; Vivien Sándorházi
2023	Gergő Pytel	Vivien Sándorházi	Balázs Pápai; Bálint Pápai	Daniella Gonda; Ágnes Kőrösi	Miklós Kis-Kasza; Nikol Vetor
2024	Márton Szerecz	Daniella Gonda	Miklós Kis-Kasza; Daniella Gonda	Daniella Gonda; Mónika Szőke	Miklós Kis-Kasza; Daniella Gonda
2025	Ádám Könczöl	Vivien Sándorházi	Zoltán Kereszti; Márton Szerecz	Daniella Gonda; Ágnes Kőrösi	Miklós Kis-Kasza; Vivien Sándorházi
