= Badminton at the 1992 Summer Olympics – Women's singles =

Badminton at the Olympics

Women's Singles at the Games of the XXVI Olympiad
- Venue: Pavelló de la Mar Bella
- Date: 28 July – 4 August 1992
- Competitors: 52 from 27 nations

Medalists
1st place, gold medalist(s)		Susi Susanti	Indonesia
2nd place, silver medalist(s)		Bang Soo-hyun	South Korea
3rd place, bronze medalist(s)		Huang Hua	China
3rd place, bronze medalist(s)		Tang Jiuhong	China

The winner of the women's singles competition received the first official badminton medal in Olympic history. It was also the first gold medal for Indonesia, which before had only won one silver (in archery). 52 players from 27 nations competed in women's singles.

== Draw ==
=== First rounds ===
==== Section 1 ====
First Round
(Indonesia) Susi Susanti
BYE
(Japan) Harumi Kohara
BYE
(Netherlands) Eline Coene	8	9
(Hong Kong) Wong Chun Fan	11	12
(Switzerland) Silvia Albrecht	11	11
(Bulgaria) Nely Nedyalkova	3	6
(Denmark) Pernille Nedergaard
BYE
(Poland) Katarzyna Krasowska	5	11	11
(Hungary) Andrea Harsagi	11	0	6
(Thailand) Somharuthai Jaroensiri	11	11
(United States) Joy Kitzmiller	3	0
(Sweden) Christine Magnusson	11	11
(Mauritius) Martine de Souza	1	0

Second Round
(Indonesia) Susi Susanti	11	11
(Japan) Harumi Kohara	2	2
(Hong Kong) Wong Chun Fan	8	11	11
(Switzerland) Silvia Albrecht	11	4	3
(Denmark) Pernille Nedergaard	11	11
(Poland) Katarzyna Krasowska	0	3
(Thailand) Somharuthai Jaroensiri	8	12	11
(Sweden) Christine Magnusson	11	9	4

Third Round
(Indonesia) Susi Susanti	11	11
(Hong Kong) Wong Chun Fan	4	2
(Denmark) Pernille Nedergaard	11	6	10
(Thailand) Somharuthai Jaroensiri	5	11	12

Quarter Finals
(Indonesia) Susi Susanti	11	11
(Thailand) Somharuthai Jaroensiri	6	1

==== Section 2 ====
First Round
(China) Huang Hua
BYE
(United States) Linda French
BYE
(United Kingdom) Joanne Muggeridge	11	11
(France) Christelle Mol	5	7
(India) Madhumita Bisht	11	11
(Iceland) Elsa Nielsen	3	0
(South Korea) Lee Heung-soon
BYE
(Australia) Rhonda Cator	11	11
(Spain) Esther Sanz	9	5
(Canada) Doris Piche	11	11
(Czechoslovakia) Eva Lacinova	0	2
(Bulgaria) Diana Koleva	6	1
(Germany) Katrin Schmidt	11	11

Second Round
(China) Huang Hua	11	11
(United States) Linda French	1	1
(United Kingdom) Joanne Muggeridge	11	11
(India) Madhumita Bisht	7	8
(South Korea) Lee Heung-soon	11	11
(Australia) Rhonda Cator	1	4
(Canada) Doris Piche	11	11
(Germany) Katrin Schmidt	5	8

Third Round
(China) Huang Hua	11	11
(United Kingdom) Joanne Muggeridge	3	2
(South Korea) Lee Heung-soon	11	11
(Canada) Doris Piche	8	2

Quarter Finals
(China) Huang Hua	11	10	11
(South Korea) Lee Heung-soon	3	12	0

==== Section 3 ====
First Round
(France) Sandra Dimbour	10	9
(New Zealand) Rhona Robertson	12	12
(Thailand) Pornsawan Plungwech	11	12
(Bulgaria) Viktoria Hristova	3	9
(Netherlands) Erica van den Heuvel	11	11
(Hungary) Andrea Dako	7	3
BYE
(Indonesia) Sarwendah Kusumawardhani
(Singapore) Zarinah Abdullah	11	11
(Poland) Wioletta Wilk	5	3
(Germany) Kerstin Ubben	4	1
(Japan) Hisako Mizui	11	11
BYE
(Sweden) Catrine Bengtsson
BYE
(South Korea) Bang Soo-hyun

Second Round
(New Zealand) Rhona Robertson	9	11	9
(Thailand) Pornsawan Plungwech	12	2	12
(Netherlands) Erica van den Heuvel	8	2
(Indonesia) Sarwendah Kusumawardhani	11	11
(Singapore) Zarinah Abdullah	5	4
(Japan) Hisako Mizui	11	11
(Sweden) Catrine Bengtsson	7	3
(South Korea) Bang Soo-hyun	11	11

Third Round
(Thailand) Pornsawan Plungwech	4	2
(Indonesia) Sarwendah Kusumawardhani	11	11
(Japan) Hisako Mizui	10	1
(South Korea) Bang Soo-hyun	12	11

Quarter Finals
(Indonesia) Sarwendah Kusumawardhani	2	11	11
(South Korea) Bang Soo-hyun	11	3	12

==== Section 4 ====
First Round
(Switzerland) Bettina Villars	0	4
(Australia) Anna Lao	11	11
(Denmark) Camilla Martin	11	12
(Mauritius) Vandanah Seesurun	1	0
(Poland) Bożena Bąk	11	11
(France) Virginie Delvingt	0	2
BYE
(International Olympic Committee) Elena Rybkhina
(Canada) Denyse Julien	11	11
(United States) Erika von Heiland	2	0
(Netherlands) Astrid van der Knaap	11	11
(Hungary) Csilla Forian	3	2
BYE
(United Kingdom) Helen Troke
BYE
(China) Tang Jiuhong

Second Round
(Australia) Anna Lao	11	12
(Denmark) Camilla Martin	6	11
(Poland) Bożena Bąk	4	4
(International Olympic Committee) Elena Rybkhina	11	11
(Canada) Denyse Julien	9	11	11
(Netherlands) Astrid van der Knaap	12	3	9
(United Kingdom) Helen Troke	3	1
(China) Tang Jiuhong	11	11

Third Round
(Australia) Anna Lao	7	11	11
(International Olympic Committee) Elena Rybkhina	11	7	8
(Canada) Denyse Julien	9	0
(China) Tang Jiuhong	12	11

Quarter Finals
(Australia) Anna Lao	1	9
(China) Tang Jiuhong	11	11

=== Finals ===
Quarterfinals
(Indonesia) Susi Susanti	11	11
(Thailand) Somharuthai Jaroensiri	6	1
(China) Huang Hua	11	10	11
(South Korea) Lee Heung-soon	3	12	0
(Indonesia) Sarwendah Kusumawardhani	2	11	11
(South Korea) Bang Soo-hyun	11	3	12
(Australia) Anna Lao	1	9
(China) Tang Jiuhong	11	11

Semifinals
(Indonesia) Susi Susanti	11	11
(China) Huang Hua	4	1
(South Korea) Bang Soo-hyun	11	11
(China) Tang Jiuhong	3	2

Finals
(Indonesia) Susi Susanti	5	11	11
(South Korea) Bang Soo-hyun	11	5	3
