= Erika von Heiland =

American badminton player (born 1965)

Personal information
- Full name: Erika von Heiland Strader
- Born: December 24, 1965 (age 60) Angeles City, Philippines
- Height: 1.60 m (5 ft 3 in)
- Weight: 55 kg (121 lb)

Sport
- Country: United States
- Sport: Badminton
- Handedness: Right
- Event: Women's singles & Women's doubles
Medal record
Men's badminton
Representing United States
Pan American Games
Bronze medal – third place	Mar del Plata 1995	Doubles
Bermuda International Championships
Silver medal – second place	Bermuda 1995	Doubles

Erika von Heiland (born December 24, 1965) is an American badminton player, born in the Philippines. She competed in women's singles at the 1992 Summer Olympics in Barcelona, and in singles and doubles at the 1996 Summer Olympics. She played for the US at the 1989, 1991, and 1993 World Championships and was a member of the US Uber Cup teams in 1990, 1992, and 1996. Her career was limited by multiple knee surgeries. Von Heiland attended Arizona State University. She grew up in the Philippines, coming to the US in 1985. She later became the director of community marketing for Coca-Cola.

== Achievements ==
=== PanAm Championships ===
Women's doubles

Year	Venue	Partner	Opponent	Score	Result
1995	Mar del Plata, Argentina	(United States) Linda French	(Jamaica) Nigealia Saunders (Jamaica) Terry Leyow	15-2 15–6	Bronze
