= Csilla Fórián =

Hungarian badminton player

Personal information
- Full name: Csilla Gondáné Fórián
- Nationality: Hungarian
- Born: 2 January 1969 (age 57) Debrecen

Sport
- Sport: Badminton

Csilla Fórián (born 2 January 1969) is a Hungarian badminton player, born in Debrecen. She competed in women's singles and women's doubles at the 1992 Summer Olympics in Barcelona. Fórián made a history for the Badminton Hungary as the first ever Hungarian to medal in the European Championships, as she claimed the gold medal in the women's singles and mixed doubles 40+, and later at the BWF World Senior Championships when she won the women's singles 45+ gold medal and mixed doubles silver medal. She also won the bronze medal in the 2019 BWF World Senior Championships. Her daughter Daniella Gonda also plays badminton in the international circuit.
