= Wong Chun Fan =

Hong Kong badminton player (born 1969)

Wong Chun Fan 王進芬
Personal information
- Born: 23 September 1969 (age 56) Hong Kong

Sport
- Country: Hong Kong
- Sport: Badminton
- Event: Women's singles

Wong Chun Fan (Chinese: 王進芬; Jyutping: wong4 zeon3 fan1, born 23 September 1969) is a Hong Kong badminton player. She competed in women's singles at the 1992 Summer Olympics in Barcelona.
