= Suzanne Louis-Lane =

English badminton player

Suzanne Louis-Lane (née Suzanne Louis)
Personal information
- Nationality: English
- Born: 7 October 1965 (age 60)

Sport
- Sport: Badminton
Medal record
Badminton
Representing England
Commonwealth Games
Gold medal – first place	1994 Victoria	mixed team

Suzanne Louis-Lane (born 1965), is a female former badminton international who competed for England.

== Early life ==
She originated from Exmouth.

== Badminton career ==
Louis-Lane represented England and won a gold medal in the mixed team event and reached the quarter finals of the women's singles, at the 1994 Commonwealth Games in Victoria, British Columbia, Canada.

She was twice the English National champion in 1993 and 1994 and won the 1989 Irish Open and the 1992 Welsh International.

== Personal life ==
Her sons are Alex Lane and Ben Lane.
