= Harumi Kohara =

Japanese badminton player

Personal information
- Country: Japan
- Born: 24 June 1965 (age 60)
Medal record
Women's badminton
Representing Japan
Uber Cup
Bronze medal – third place	1990 Nagoya & Tokyo	Women's team
Asian Games
Silver medal – second place	1986 Seoul	Women's team

Harumi Kohara (born 24 June 1965) is a Japanese badminton player. She competed in women's singles and women's doubles at the 1992 Summer Olympics in Barcelona.
