= Andrea Dakó =

Hungarian badminton player

Personal information
- Nationality: Hungarian
- Born: 12 August 1972 (age 52); Budapest

Sport
- Sport: Badminton

Andrea Dakó (born 12 August 1972) is a Hungarian badminton player, born in Budapest. She competed in women's singles and women's doubles at the 1992 Summer Olympics in Barcelona.
