= Andrea Ódor =

Hungarian badminton player

Personal information
- Nationality: Hungarian
- Born: 18 November 1975 (age 49); Budapest

Sport
- Sport: Badminton

Andrea Ódor (born 18 November 1975) is a Hungarian badminton player, born in Budapest. She competed in women's singles at the 1996 Summer Olympics in Atlanta.
