= Anne Gibson (badminton) =

Scottish badminton player

Personal information
- Nationality: British (Scottish)
- Born: 26 October 1968 (age 57) Dumfries, Scotland
- Height: 173 cm (5 ft 8 in)
- Weight: 70 kg (154 lb)
- Spouse: Cameron Robertson (m. 1996)

Sport
- Sport: Badminton

Achievements and titles
- National finals: Scottish women's singles champion 1989, 1990, 1991, 1992, 1993, 1995, 1996, 1997

Anne Gibson (born 26 October 1968), married name Anne Robertson, is a former badminton player from Scotland who represented at the Olympic Games and three Commonwealth Games.

== Biography ==
Gibson played out of Dumfries and won the U18 singles at the January 1985 Central Region Open and the 1987 East of Scotland Championships.

By 1989, she was Scotland's number 1 ranked player. She moved to England around 1991 and was selected for the 1996 Olympics shortly before her wedding to Cameron Robertson. At the 1996 Summer Olympics, Gibson participated in the women's singles event.

Gibson was Scottish Women's singles champion from 1989 to 1993, and from 1995 to 1997.

She was based in Slough when she won her ninth national singles title in 1997.
