= Aileen Travers =

Scottish international badminton player

Personal information
- Born: Aileen Margaret Nairn; 19 October 1966 Perth, Scotland
- Spouse: Dan Travers

Sport
- Country: Scotland
- Sport: Badminton
- Club: Perth BC
Medal record
Representing Scotland
Scottish Nationals
Gold medal – first place	1987	singles
Gold medal – first place	1997	women's doubles
Gold medal – first place	1989, 90, 91	mixed doubles

Aileen Margaret Travers (née Nairn; born 19 October 1966) is a former international badminton player from Scotland who competed at three Commonwealth Games.

== Biography ==
Born Aileen Margaret Nairn, she played out of Perth and was a successful junior player, winning the Scottish junior singles and doubles and winning a bronze medal at the 1986 European Junior Championships.

A Dundee dental graduate, she lived in Muirend Grove, Perth and was a full Scottish international.

Nairn represented the Scottish team at the 1986 Commonwealth Games in Edinburgh, Scotland, where she competed in the women's and mixed doubles events.

She was the 1987 singles champion at the Scottish National Badminton Championships. Nairn won three consecutive mixed doubles national titles with Dan Travers from 1989 to 1991 and attended her second and third Commonwealth Games at the 1990 Commonwealth Games in Auckland, New Zealand and the 1994 Commonwealth Games in Victoria, British Columbia, Canada, respectively.

Nairn played in her third Games under the name of Aileen Travers, following her marriage to her doubles partner Dan Travers.

In 1997, Travers teamed up with Elinor Middlemiss and they won the national doubles.
