= Linda French (badminton) =

American badminton player (born 1964)

Personal information
- Nationality: American
- Born: March 4, 1964 (age 62) Elmhurst, Illinois

Sport
- Sport: Badminton

Linda French (born March 4, 1964) is an American badminton player. She competed in women's singles and women's doubles at the 1992 Summer Olympics in Barcelona. She also competed at the 1996 Summer Olympics.

== Achievements ==
=== PanAm Championships ===
Women's doubles
Year	Venue	Partner	Opponent	Score	Result
1991	Kingston, Jamaica	(United States) Joy Kitzmiller	(Canada) Doris Piché (Canada) Denyse Julien		Silver
