= Astrid van der Knaap =

Dutch badminton player

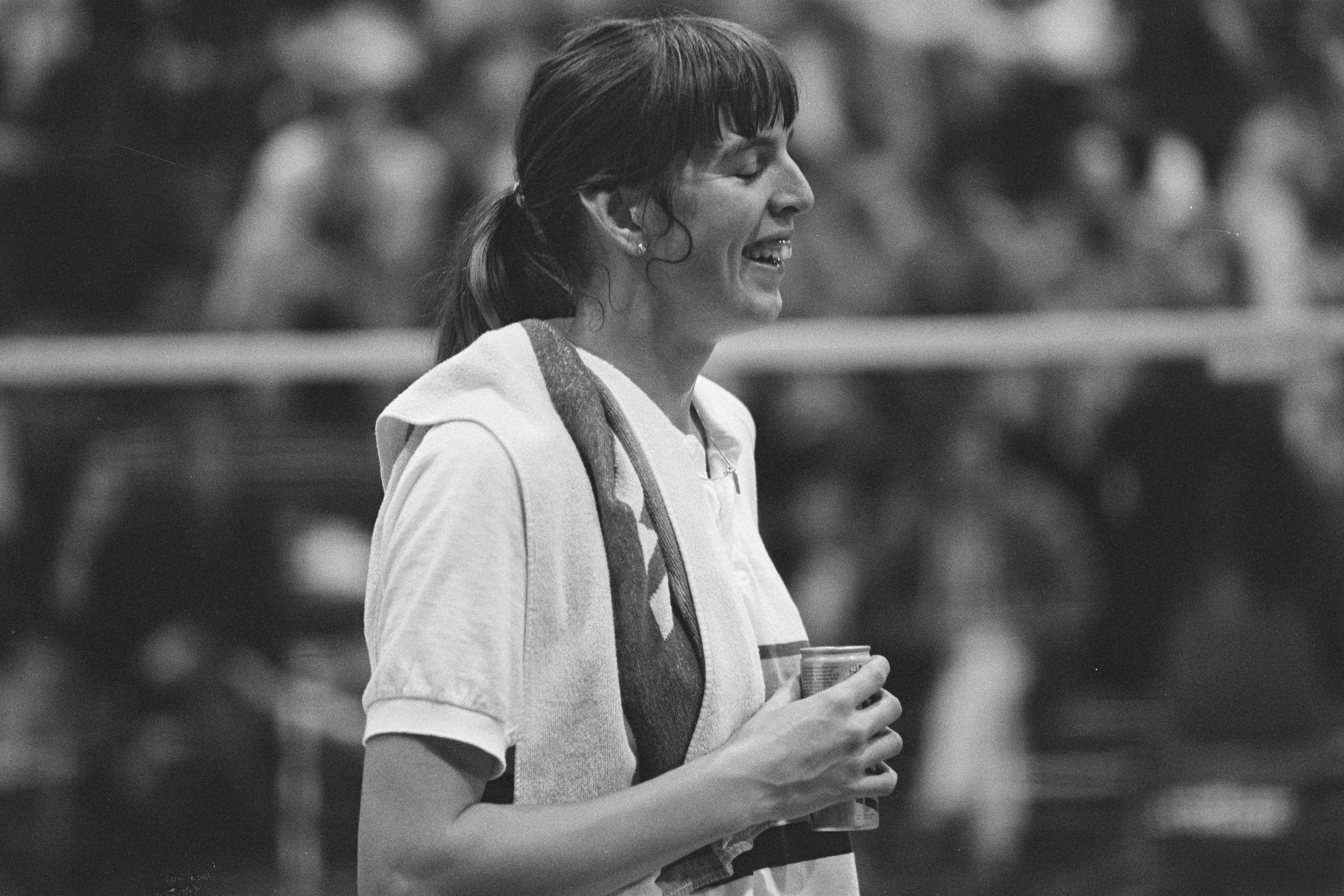
- van der Knaap in 1986

Personal information
- Full name: Agatha Astrid Maria van der Knaap
- Born: 8 October 1964 (age 62) Den Haag, Zuid-Holland, Netherlands
- Height: 181 cm (5 ft 11 in)
- Weight: 69 kg (152 lb)

Sport
- Sport: Badminton
- Handedness: Right
- Event: Women's singles
Medal record
Representing Netherlands
European Junior Championships
Bronze medal – third place	1983 Helsinki	Girls' doubles

Astrid van der Knaap (born 8 October 1964) is a Dutch badminton player, born in The Hague. She competed in women's singles at the 1992 Summer Olympics in Barcelona. She was four times the Dutch National Ladies Singles Champion in 1988, 1991, 1993 & 1994. She was runner-up at the World Grand Prix Dutch Open event in 1988. She won the Swiss Open twice in 1987 & 1992.

== Achievements ==
=== European Junior Championships ===
Girls' doubles
Year	Venue	Partner	Opponent	Score	Result
1983	Helsinkian Sports Hall; Helsinki, Finland	(Netherlands) Nicole van Zijderveld	(Sweden) Jeanette Kuhl (Sweden) Christine Magnusson	15–13, 6–15, 11–15	Bronze

=== IBF World Grand Prix ===
The World Badminton Grand Prix sanctioned by International Badminton Federation (IBF) since 1983.

Women's singles
Year	Tournament	Opponent	Score	Result
1987	Poona Open	(Indonesia) Sarwendah Kusumawardhani	11–2, 11–0	(gold) Winner
1988	Dutch Open	(England) Fiona Smith	12–10, 11–12, 1–11	(silver) Runner-up
1992	Swiss Open	(Sweden) Catrine Bengtsson	1–11, 11–3, 11–9	(gold) Winner

=== IBF International Series ===
Women's singles
Year	Tournament	Opponent	Score	Result
1987	Austrian International	(Netherlands) Monique Hoogland	11–4, 11–6	(gold) Winner
1987	Swiss Open	(Netherlands) Monique Hoogland	11–7, 7–11, 11–4	(gold) Winner
1988	Amor International	(Netherlands) Monique Hoogland	11–6, 11–4	(gold) Winner
1991	Amor International	(England) Joanne Muggeridge	11–6, 11–6	(gold) Winner
1991	Portugal International	(Russia) Marina Yakusheva	11–5, 11–6	(gold) Winner
1992	La Chaux de Fonds International	(Netherlands) Eline Coene	11–9, 11–12, 11–7	(gold) Winner
1993	Austrian International	(Austria) Irina Serova	8–11, 7–11	(silver) Runner-up

== Summary ==
Year - Tournament	Event	Result	Name
1982 Dutch National Junior Championships	Mixed Doubles	(gold) Winner	Jurgen van der Pot / Astrid van der Knaap
1982 Dutch National Junior Championships	Girls Doubles	(gold) Winner	Astrid van der Knaap / Nicole van Zijderveld
1983 Dutch National Junior Championships	Girls Singles	(gold) Winner	Astrid van der Knaap
1983 Dutch National Junior Championships	Girls Doubles	(gold) Winner	Astrid van der Knaap / N. van Zijderveld
1983 European Junior Badminton Championships	Girls Doubles	(bronze) Bronze	Astrid van der Knaap / Nicole van Zijderveld (Netherlands)
1987 Poona Open	Women's singles	(gold) Winner	Astrid van der Knaap
1987 Swiss Open	Women's singles	(gold) Winner	Astrid van der Knaap
1987 Austrian International	Women's singles	(gold) Winner	Astrid van der Knaap
1988 Amor International	Women's singles	(gold) Winner	Astrid van der Knaap
1988 Dutch National Badminton Championships	Women's singles	(gold) Winner	Astrid van der Knaap
1988 Dutch Open	Women's singles	(silver) Runner-up	Astrid van der Knaap
1989 Dutch Open	Women's singles	(bronze) Bronze	Astrid van der Knaap
1989 German Open	Women's singles	(bronze) Bronze	Astrid van der Knaap
1989 Indonesia Open	Women's doubles	(bronze) Bronze	Astrid van der Knaap (Netherlands) / Maria Bengtsson (Sweden)
1991 Dutch National Badminton Championships	Women's singles	(gold) Winner	Astrid van der Knaap
1991 Amor International	Women's singles	(gold) Winner	Astrid van der Knaap
1991 Portugal International	Women's singles	(gold) Winner	Astrid van der Knaap
1991 Portugal International	Women's doubles	(bronze) Bronze	Astrid van der Knaap (Netherlands) / Heidemarie Bender (Germany)
1991 Scottish Open	Women's singles	(bronze) Bronze	Astrid van der Knaap
1992 La Chaux-de-Fonds International	Women's singles	(gold) Winner	Astrid van der Knaap
1992 Swiss Open	Women's singles	(gold) Winner	Astrid van der Knaap
1992 Olympic Games	Women's singles	17	Astrid van der Knaap
1993 Dutch National Badminton Championships	Women's singles	(gold) Winner	Astrid van der Knaap
1993 La Chaux-de-Fonds International	Women's singles	(bronze) Bronze	Astrid van der Knaap
1994 Dutch National Badminton Championships	Women's singles	(gold) Winner	Astrid van der Knaap
