= Andrea Harsági =

Hungarian badminton player

Personal information
- Nationality: Hungarian
- Born: 22 March 1971 (age 53); Nyíregyháza, Hungary

Sport
- Sport: Badminton

Andrea Harsági (born 22 March 1971) is a Hungarian badminton player. She competed in women's singles at the 1992 Summer Olympics in Barcelona.
