= Bettina Villars =

Swiss badminton player

Personal information
- Nationality: Swiss
- Born: 8 July 1964 (age 61) Switzerland

Sport
- Sport: Badminton
Medal record
Women's badminton
Representing Switzerland
World Senior Championships
Silver medal – second place	2025 Pattaya	Women's singles 60+

Bettina Villars (born 8 July 1964) is a Swiss badminton player. She competed in women's singles and women's doubles at the 1992 Summer Olympics in Barcelona.

== Achievements ==
=== World Senior Championships ===
Women's singles

Year	Age	Venue	Opponent	Score	Result	Ref
2025	60+	Eastern National Sports Training Centre, Pattaya, Thailand	(United States) Bin Lin	10–21, 24–26	Silver	
