= Bożena Bąk =

Polish badminton player (born 1966)

Personal information
- Nationality: Polish
- Born: 28 January 1966 (age 59); Głubczyce, Poland

Sport
- Sport: Badminton

Bożena Bąk (born 28 January 1966) is a Polish badminton player. She competed in women's singles and women's doubles at the 1992 Summer Olympics in Barcelona.
