= Joy Kitzmiller =

American badminton player (born 1964)

Joy Ellen Kitzmiller (born May 12, 1964, in Manhattan Beach, California) is an American badminton player who played Badminton at the 1992 Summer Olympics.

== Career ==
She started playing in tournaments at 11 and began having real success at 13. In 1981 she won the girl's single division at the junior Nationals. She credited badminton for getting her to Stanford University. She went on to wins at the U.S. National Badminton Championships and qualifying for the Olympics. At that time her international ranking was just 98th due to the US not traditionally being a power in the sport. Her mother Ruth also had a long time interest in the sport. Joy competed in a "Seniors Event" in 2008.
