= 1996 Uber Cup qualification =

Tournament details
- Dates: 18–25 February 1996
- Location: Asian zone: Auckland; European zone: Prague

The qualifying process for the 1996 Uber Cup took place from 18 to 25 February 1996 to decide the final teams which would play in the final tournament.

== Qualification process ==
The qualification process was divided into two regions, the Asian Zone and the European Zone. Seeded teams received a bye into the second round while unseeded teams competed in the first round for a place in the second round. The first two rounds were played in a round-robin format. Teams in the second round competed for a place in the knockout stages. Semi-final winners in each zone were guaranteed qualification for the final tournament to be held in Hong Kong while the remaining teams competed in a third place playoff match for a place in the final tournament.

Indonesia qualified for the final tournament as defending champions while Hong Kong qualified as hosts.

=== Qualified teams ===
Country	Qualified as	Qualified on	Final appearance
Hong Kong	1996 Uber Cup hosts	January 1996	1st
Indonesia	1994 Uber Cup winners	20 May 1994	14th
South Korea	Asian Zone winners	25 February 1996	7th
China	Asian Zone runners-up	25 February 1996	7th
Japan	Third place in Asian Zone	25 February 1996	12th
Denmark	European Zone winners	25 February 1996	10th
Russia	European Zone runners-up	25 February 1996	2nd
England	Third place in European Zone	25 February 1996	11th

== Asian Zone ==
The qualification rounds for the Asian Zone were held from 18 to 25 February at Auckland Badminton Hall in Auckland, New Zealand. Ten teams took part in qualifying for the final tournament.

=== First round ===
==== Group A ====
Pos	Team	Pld	W	L	MF	MA	MD	Pts	Qualification
1	Chinese Taipei	2	2	0	10	0	+10	2	Advance to second round
2	New Zealand	2	1	1	5	5	0	1	Advance to second round
3	Sri Lanka	2	0	2	0	10	−10	0	

Source: International Badminton Federation

Chinese Taipei
5
Auckland Badminton Hall
18 February 1996

Sri Lanka
0

		Result
1	Chan Ya-lin	2 – 0 (11–3, 11–0)	Kaushalya Dissanayake
2	Huang Chia-chi	2 – 0 (11–5, 11–2)	Chandrika de Silva
3	Jeng Shwu-jen	2 – 0 (11–1, 11–1)	Inoka Rohini
4	Kao Shin-li; Lee Ming-hwa	2 – 0 (15–6, 15–1)	Kaushalya Dissanayake; Chandrika de Silva
5	Jeng Shwu-jen; Tsai Hui-min	2 – 0 (15–2, 15–3)	Inoka Rohini; Chamika Tilakarathna

New Zealand
5
Auckland Badminton Hall
19 February 1996

Sri Lanka
0

		Result
1	Rhona Robertson	2 – 0 (11–1, 11–0)	Kaushalya Dissanayake
2	Julie Still	2 – 0 (11–9, 3–11, 12–10)	Chandrika de Silva
3	Amanda Carter	2 – 0 (11–1, 11–7)	Inoka Rohini
4	Megan Heaney; Julie Still	2 – 1 (11–15, 15–9, 15–10)	Kaushalya Dissanayake; Chandrika de Silva
5	Tammy Jenkins; Rhona Robertson	2 – 0 (15–2, 15–1)	Inoka Rohini; Chamika Tilakarathna

New Zealand
0
Auckland Badminton Hall
20 February 1996

Chinese Taipei
5

		Result
1	Rhona Robertson	0 – 2 (5–11, 7–11)	Chan Ya-lin
2	Julie Still	0 – 2 (2–11, 5–11)	Huang Chia-chi
3	Amanda Carter	0 – 2 (1–11, 4–11)	Jeng Shwu-jen
4	Megan Heaney; Julie Still	0 – 2 (3–15, 6–15)	Kao Shin-li; Lee Ming-hwa
5	Tammy Jenkins; Rhona Robertson	0 – 2 (11–15, 4–15)	Jeng Shwu-jen; Tsai Hui-min

==== Group B ====
Pos	Team	Pld	W	L	MF	MA	MD	Pts	Qualification
1	Malaysia	2	2	0	8	2	+6	2	Advance to second round
2	Australia	2	1	1	5	5	0	1	Advance to second round
3	Singapore	2	0	2	2	8	−6	0	

Source: International Badminton Federation

Australia
4
Auckland Badminton Hall
18 February 1996

Singapore
1

		Result
1	Song Yang	0 – 2 (5–11, 11–12)	Zarinah Abdullah
2	Lisa Campbell	2 – 0 (11–2, 11–2)	Fatimah Kumin Lim
3	Amanda Hardy	2 – 0 (10–12, 11–9, 11–6)	Chin Yen Peng
4	Rhonda Cator; Amanda Hardy	2 – 0 (15–10, 15–1)	Zanetta Li Yu; Zarinah Abdullah
5	Lisa Campbell; Song Yang	2 – 0 (15–1, 15–5)	Chin Yen Peng; Fatimah Kumin Lim

Malaysia
4
Auckland Badminton Hall
19 February 1996

Singapore
1

		Result
1	Chan Chia Fong	0 – 2 (0–11, 4–11)	Zarinah Abdullah
2	Ishwarii Boopathy	2 – 0 (11–2, 11–9)	Zanetta Li Yu
3	Winnie Lee	2 – 0 (11–5, 11–0)	Chin Yen Peng
4	Kuak Seok Choon; Norhasikin Amin	2 – 0 (15–5, 15–7)	Zanetta Li Yu; Zarinah Abdullah
5	Chor Hooi Yee; Lim Pek Siah	2 – 0 (15–8, 15–7)	Chin Yen Peng; Fatimah Kumin Lim

Malaysia
4
Auckland Badminton Hall
20 February 1996

Australia
1

		Result
1	Chan Chia Fong	0 – 2 (8–11, 4–11)	Song Yang
2	Geevien Saha	2 – 0 (11–2, 11–4)	Kellie Lucas
3	Winnie Lee	2 – 0 (12–9, 11–5)	Rayoni Head
4	Kuak Seok Choon; Norhasikin Amin	2 – 0 (15–10, 15–5)	Lisa Campbell; Kellie Lucas
5	Chor Hooi Yee; Lim Pek Siah	2 – 0 (15–4, 15–3)	Nicole Harwood; Rayoni Head

=== Second round ===
==== Group X ====
Pos	Team	Pld	W	L	MF	MA	MD	Pts	Qualification
1	South Korea	3	3	0	15	0	+15	3	Advance to knockout stage
2	Thailand	3	2	1	6	9	−3	2	Advance to knockout stage
3	Chinese Taipei	3	1	2	5	10	−5	1	
4	Australia	3	0	3	4	11	−7	0	

Source: International Badminton Federation

Thailand
3
Auckland Badminton Hall
21 February 1996

Chinese Taipei
2

		Result
1	Somharuthai Jaroensiri	2 – 1 (2–11, 11–7, 11–7)	Chan Ya-lin
2	Pornsawan Plungwech	1 – 2 (11–3, 9–12, 4–11)	Huang Chia-chi
3	Sujitra Ekmongkolpaisarn	2 – 1 (11–8, 7–11, 12–9)	Jeng Shwu-jen
4	Plernta Boonyarit; Pornsawan Plungwech	1 – 2 (12–15, 15–13, 3–15)	Kao Shin-li; Lee Ming-hwa
5	Sujitra Ekmongkolpaisarn; Somharuthai Jaroensiri	0 – 2 (9–15, 8–15)	Jeng Shwu-jen; Tsai Hui-min

South Korea
5
Auckland Badminton Hall
21 February 1996

Australia
0

		Result
1	Bang Soo-hyun	2 – 0 (11–3, 11–0)	Lisa Campbell
2	Kim Ji-hyun	2 – 0 (11–0, 11–0)	Kellie Lucas
3	Lee Joo-hyun	2 – 0 (11–2, 11–4)	Rayoni Head
4	Park Soo-yun; Chung Jae-hee	2 – 0 (15–11, 15–2)	Rhonda Cator; Amanda Hardy
5	Kim Shin-young; Ra Kyung-min	2 – 0 (15–4, 15–0)	Nicole Harwood; Rayoni Head

Thailand
3
Auckland Badminton Hall
22 February 1996

Australia
2

		Result
1	Somharuthai Jaroensiri	2 – 0 (11–3, 11–7)	Song Yang
2	Pornsawan Plungwech	0 – 2 (5–11, 7–11)	Lisa Campbell
3	Sujitra Ekmongkolpaisarn	2 – 0 (11–2, 11–0)	Rayoni Head
4	Plernta Boonyarit; Pornsawan Plungwech	0 – 2 (7–15, 10–15)	Rhonda Cator; Amanda Hardy
5	Somharuthai Jaroensiri; Sujitra Ekmongkolpaisarn	2 – 0 (15–6, 15–9)	Nicole Harwood; Kellie Lucas

South Korea
5
Auckland Badminton Hall
22 February 1996

Chinese Taipei
0

		Result
1	Bang Soo-hyun	2 – 0 (11–6, 11–0)	Chan Ya-lin
2	Kim Ji-hyun	2 – 0 (11–5, 11–6)	Huang Chia-chi
3	Lee Joo-hyun	2 – 0 (11–3, 11–7)	Jeng Shwu-jen
4	Kim Mee-hyang; Kim Shin-young	2 – 0 (15–7, 15–10)	Kao Shin-li; Lee Ming-hwa
5	Park Soo-yun; Ra Kyung-min	2 – 0 (15–2, 15–5)	Shyu Yu-ling; Tsai Hui-min

South Korea
5
Auckland Badminton Hall
23 February 1996

Thailand
0

		Result
1	Bang Soo-hyun	2 – 0 (11–4, 11–3)	Somharuthai Jaroensiri
2	Kim Ji-hyun	2 – 0 (11–1, 11–0)	Sujitra Ekmongkolpaisarn
3	Lee Joo-hyun	2 – 0 (11–0, 11–3)	Ruksita Sookboonmak
4	Chung Jae-hee; Park Soo-yun	2 – 0 (15–0, 15–5)	Plernta Boonyarit; Pornsawan Plungwech
5	Gil Young-ah; Kim Shin-young	2 – 0 (15–1, 15–3)	Natsaran Boonvorametee; Sujitra Ekmongkolpaisarn

Chinese Taipei
3
Auckland Badminton Hall
23 February 1996

Australia
2

		Result
1	Chan Ya-lin	0 – 2 (8–11, 5–11)	Song Yang
2	Huang Chia-chi	0 – 2 (8–11, 5–11)	Lisa Campbell
3	Jeng Shwu-jen	2 – 0 (11–4, 11–4)	Kellie Lucas
4	Kao Shin-li; Lee Ming-hwa	2 – 0 (15–4, 15–6)	Rhonda Cator; Amanda Hardy
5	Shyu Yu-ling; Tsai Hui-min	1 – 2 (15–5, 7–15, 13–15)	Lisa Campbell; Song Yang

==== Group Y ====
Pos	Team	Pld	W	L	MF	MA	MD	Pts	Qualification
1	China	3	3	0	15	0	+15	3	Advance to knockout stage
2	Japan	3	2	1	10	5	+5	2	Advance to knockout stage
3	New Zealand	3	1	2	3	12	−9	1	
4	Malaysia	3	0	3	2	13	−11	0	

Source: International Badminton Federation

Japan
5
Auckland Badminton Hall
21 February 1996

Malaysia
0

		Result
1	Hisako Mizui	2 – 0 (11–5, 11–0)	Chan Chia Fong
2	Yasuko Mizui	2 – 0 (11–6, 11–3)	Geevien Saha
3	Takako Ida	2 – 0 (11–0, 11–1)	Winnie Lee
4	Masako Sakamoto; Tomomi Matsuo	2 – 0 (15–10, 15–3)	Kuak Seok Choon; Norhasikin Amin
5	Aiko Miyamura; Akiko Miyamura	2 – 0 (15–10, 15–9)	Chor Hooi Yee; Lim Pek Siah

China
5
Auckland Badminton Hall
21 February 1996

New Zealand
0

		Result
1	Ye Zhaoying	2 – 0 (11–6, 11–5)	Amanda Carter
2	Han Jingna	2 – 0 (11–2, 11–1)	Megan Heaney
3	Zhang Ning	2 – 0 (11–2, 11–1)	Kati Tibor
4	Ge Fei; Gu Jun	2 – 0 (15–1, 15–3)	Tammy Jenkins; Rhona Robertson
5	Chen Ying; Peng Xingyong	2 – 0 (15–2, 15–1)	Megan Heaney; Julie Still

Japan
5
Auckland Badminton Hall
22 February 1996

New Zealand
0

		Result
1	Hisako Mizui	2 – 1 (6–11, 11–9, 11–3)	Rhona Robertson
2	Yasuko Mizui	2 – 0 (11–2, 11–7)	Megan Heaney
3	Takako Ida	2 – 0 (11–1, 11–0)	Kati Tibor
4	Tomomi Matsuo; Masako Sakamoto	2 – 0 (15–4, 15–7)	Tammy Jenkins; Rhona Robertson
5	Aiko Miyamura; Akiko Miyamura	2 – 0 (15–2, 15–9)	Amanda Carter; Julie Still

China
5
Auckland Badminton Hall
22 February 1996

Malaysia
0

		Result
1	Ye Zhaoying	2 – 0 (11–3, 11–2)	Ishwarii Boopathy
2	Han Jingna	2 – 0 (11–3, 11–2)	Geevien Saha
3	Zhang Ning	2 – 0 (11–7, 11–2)	Law Pei Pei
4	Qin Yiyuan; Tang Yongshu	2 – 0 (15–1, 15–7)	Kuak Seok Choon; Norhasikin Amin
5	Chen Ying; Peng Xingyong	2 – 0 (15–9, 15–1)	Law Pei Pei; Lim Pek Siah

New Zealand
3
Auckland Badminton Hall
23 February 1996

Malaysia
2

		Result
1	Rhona Robertson	2 – 0 (11–1, 12–9)	Chan Chia Fong
2	Julie Still	2 – 0 (11–8, 11–1)	Geevien Saha
3	Amanda Carter	1 – 2 (12–11, 8–11, 9–11)	Winnie Lee
4	Tammy Jenkins; Rhona Robertson	2 – 0 (15–6, 15–4)	Kuak Seok Choon; Norhasikin Amin
5	Megan Heaney; Julie Still	0 – 2 (5–15, 12–15)	Law Pei Pei; Lim Pek Siah

China
5
Auckland Badminton Hall
23 February 1996

Japan
0

		Result
1	Ye Zhaoying	2 – 0 (11–6, 11–4)	Hisako Mizui
2	Han Jingna	2 – 1 (11–5, 7–11, 11–9)	Yasuko Mizui
3	Zhang Ning	2 – 1 (11–6, 10–12, 11–2)	Takako Ida
4	Ge Fei; Gu Jun	2 – 0 (15–4, 15–1)	Tomomi Matsuo; Masako Sakamoto
5	Chen Ying; Peng Xingyong	2 – 0 (15–8, 15–7)	Aiko Miyamura; Akiko Miyamura

=== Knockout stage ===
Semi-finals
South Korea	4
Japan	1
Thailand	0
China	5

Final
South Korea	3
China	2
Third place
Japan	4
Thailand	1

==== Semi-finals ====
China
5
Auckland Badminton Hall
24 February 1996

Thailand
0

		Result
1	Ye Zhaoying	2 – 0 (11–6, 11–2)	Somharuthai Jaroensiri
2	Wang Chen	2 – 0 (11–7, 11–5)	Pornsawan Plungwech
3	Zhang Ning	2 – 0 (11–3, 11–5)	Sujitra Ekmongkolpaisarn
4	Ge Fei; Gu Jun	2 – 0 (15–1, 15–6)	Plernta Boonyarit; Pornsawan Plungwech
5	Qin Yiyuan; Tang Yongshu	2 – 0 (15–1, 15–5)	Natsaran Boonvorametee; Ruksita Sookboonmak

South Korea
4
Auckland Badminton Hall
24 February 1996

Japan
1

		Result
1	Bang Soo-hyun	2 – 0	Hisako Mizui
2	Kim Ji-hyun	2 – 0	Yasuko Mizui
3	Lee Joo-hyun	0 – 2	Takako Ida
4	Gil Young-ah; Kim Shin-young	2 – 0	Tomomi Matsuo; Masako Sakamoto
5	Kim Mee-hyang; Ra Kyung-min	2 – 0	Aiko Miyamura; Akiko Miyamura

==== Third place ====
Japan
4
Auckland Badminton Hall
25 February 1996

Thailand
1

		Result
1	Hisako Mizui	1 – 2 (12–11, 8–11, 3–11)	Somharuthai Jaroensiri
2	Yasuko Mizui	2 – 0 (12–10, 11–0)	Pornsawan Plungwech
3	Takako Ida	2 – 0 (11–3, 11–4)	Sujitra Ekmongkolpaisarn
4	Tomomi Matsuo; Masako Sakamoto	2 – 0 (15–5, 15–9)	Plernta Boonyarit; Pornsawan Plungwech
5	Aiko Miyamura; Akiko Miyamura	2 – 0 (15–5, 15–6)	Natsaran Boonvorametee; Sujitra Ekmongkolpaisarn

==== Final ====
South Korea
3
Auckland Badminton Hall
25 February 1996

China
2

		Result
1	Bang Soo-hyun	2 – 0 (12–10, 11–7)	Ye Zhaoying
2	Ra Kyung-min	2 – 0 (12–10, 12–9)	Wang Chen
3	Kim Ji-hyun	0 – 2 (4–11, 10–12)	Zhang Ning
4	Kim Mee-hyang; Kim Shin-young	1 – 2 (15–13, 10–15, 8–15)	Ge Fei; Gu Jun
5	Gil Young-ah; Park Soo-yun	2 – 1 (13–18, 15–12, 15–4)	Chen Ying; Peng Xingyong

== European Zone ==
The European qualifying rounds were held in Průhonice Hall in Prague, Czech Republic.

=== First round ===
==== Group A ====
Pos	Team	Pld	W	L	MF	MA	MD	Pts	Qualification
1	Switzerland	3	3	0	13	2	+11	3	Advance to second round
2	Kazakhstan	3	2	1	11	4	+7	2	
3	Peru	3	1	2	5	10	−5	1	
4	Estonia	3	0	3	1	14	−13	0	

Source: International Badminton Federation

Switzerland
3
Průhonice Hall
18 February 1996

Kazakhstan
2

		Result
1	Silvia Albrecht	1 – 2 (11–4, 8–11, 10–12)	Irina Gritsenko
2	Santi Wibowo	2 – 1 (11–12, 11–7, 12–11)	Ludmila Okuneva
3	Judith Baumeyer	1 – 2 (11–6, 3–11, 10–12)	Olesia Sholar
4	Silvia Albrecht; Santi Wibowo	2 – 1 (16–18, 15–9, 15–9)	Irina Gritsenko; Ludmila Okuneva
5	Judith Baumeyer; Yvonne Naef	2 – 1 (15–4, 5–15, 17–15)	Tatiana Kovalenko; Olesia Sholar

Peru
5
Průhonice Hall
18 February 1996

Estonia
0

		Result
1	Lorena Blanco	2 – 0 (11–6, 11–5)	Kelli Vilu
2	Ximena Bellido	2 – 0 (11–2, 11–7)	Kairi Saks
3	Sandra Jimeno	2 – 0 (11–8, 11–2)	Liia Dubkovskaja
4	Ximena Bellido; Lorena Blanco	2 – 0 (15–11, 15–9)	Kati Kraaving; Kelli Vilu
5	Sandra Jimeno; Doriana Rivera	2 – 0 (15–3, 15–10)	Liia Dubkovskaja; Mare Pedanik

Switzerland
5
Průhonice Hall
19 February 1996

Peru
0

		Result
1	Silvia Albrecht	2 – 1 (8–11, 11–5, 11–6)	Lorena Blanco
2	Santi Wibowo	2 – 0 (11–8, 11–1)	Ximena Bellido
3	Judith Baumeyer	2 – 1 (11–5, 7–11, 11–3)	Sandra Jimeno
4	Silvia Albrecht; Santi Wibowo	2 – 0 (15–9, 15–0)	Ximena Bellido; Lorena Blanco
5	Judith Baumeyer; Yvonne Naef	2 – 0 (15–9, 15–5)	Sandra Jimeno; Doriana Rivera

Kazakhstan
4
Průhonice Hall
19 February 1996

Estonia
1

		Result
1	Irina Gritsenko	2 – 0 (11–4, 11–2)	Kelli Vilu
2	Ludmila Okuneva	2 – 0 (11–2, 11–1)	Kairi Saks
3	Olesia Sholar	2 – 0 (11–4, 11–6)	Kati Kraaving
4	Irina Gritsenko; Ludmila Okuneva	2 – 0 (17–14, 15–5)	Kati Kraaving; Kelli Vilu
5	Tatiana Kovalenko; Olesia Sholar	1 – 2 (8–15, 15–7, 12–15)	Liia Dubkovskaja; Mare Pedanik

Switzerland
5
Průhonice Hall
20 February 1996

Estonia
0

		Result
1	Silvia Albrecht	2 – 0 (11–5, 11–3)	Kelli Vilu
2	Santi Wibowo	2 – 0 (11–0, 11–4)	Kairi Saks
3	Judith Baumeyer	2 – 0 (11–5, 12–10)	Kati Kraaving
4	Yvonne Naef; Santi Wibowo	2 – 0 (15–4, 15–0)	Kati Kraaving; Kelli Vilu
5	Silvia Albrecht; Judith Baumeyer	2 – 0 (15–1, 15–8)	Liia Dubkovskaja; Mare Pedanik

Kazakhstan
5
Průhonice Hall
20 February 1996

Peru
0

		Result
1	Irina Gritsenko	2 – 0	Lorena Blanco
2	Ludmila Okuneva	2 – 0	Ximena Bellido
3	Olesia Sholar	2 – 1	Sandra Jimeno
4	Irina Gritsenko; Ludmila Okuneva	2 – 0	Ximena Bellido; Lorena Blanco
5	Tatiana Kovalenko; Olesia Sholar	2 – 0	Sandra Jimeno; Doriana Rivera

==== Group B ====
Pos	Team	Pld	W	L	MF	MA	MD	Pts	Qualification
1	India	4	4	0	18	2	+16	4	Advance to second round
2	Poland	4	3	1	13	7	+6	3	
3	South Africa	4	2	2	10	10	0	2	
4	Italy	4	1	3	6	14	−8	1	
5	Israel	4	0	4	3	17	−14	0	

Source: International Badminton Federation

India
5
Průhonice Hall
18 February 1996

Italy
0

		Result
1	P. V. V. Lakshmi	2 – 0	Beate Dejaco
2	Manjusha Pavangadkar	2 – 0	Monica Memoli
3	Aparna Popat	2 – 0	Yuyu Wang
4	P. V. V. Lakshmi; P. V. Sharada	2 – 0	Monica Memoli; Maria Luisa Mur
5	K. Neelima Chowdary; Manjusha Pavangadkar	2 – 0	Beate Dejaco; Maria Grazia Italiano

Poland
4
Průhonice Hall
18 February 1996

South Africa
1

		Result
1	Katarzyna Krasowska	2 – 0	Lina Fourie
2	Joanna Szleszyńska	2 – 0	Tracey Thompson
3	Dorota Borek	1 – 2	Michelle Edwards
4	Sylwia Rutkiewicz; Beata Syta	2 – 0	Lina Fourie; Tracey Thompson
5	Katarzyna Krasowska; Joanna Szleszyńska	2 – 0	Linda Montignies; Monique Till

Poland
3
Průhonice Hall
18 February 1996

Italy
2

		Result
1	Katarzyna Krasowska	2 – 0	Beate Dejaco
2	Joanna Szleszyńska	2 – 1	Monica Memoli
3	Beata Syta	1 – 2	Yuyu Wang
4	Sylwia Rutkiewicz; Dorota Borek	2 – 1	Monica Memoli; Maria Luisa Mur
5	Katarzyna Krasowska; Joanna Szleszyńska	1 – 2	Beate Dejaco; Yuyu Wang

South Africa
4
Průhonice Hall
18 February 1996

Israel
1

		Result
1	Lina Fourie	1 – 2	Svetlana Zilberman
2	Tracey Thompson	2 – 0	Sigalit Moses
3	Monique Till	2 – 0	Shoshana Moses
4	Lina Fourie; Tracey Thompson	2 – 0	Sigalit Moses; Svetlana Zilberman
5	Linda Montignies; Monique Till	2 – 0	Shoshana Moses; Ira Srabrinski

India
4
Průhonice Hall
19 February 1996

Poland
1

		Result
1	P. V. V. Lakshmi	0 – 2	Katarzyna Krasowska
2	Manjusha Pavangadkar	2 – 0	Joanna Szleszyńska
3	K. Neelima Chowdary	2 – 1	Dorota Borek
4	P. V. V. Lakshmi; P. V. Sharada	2 – 1	Sylwia Rutkiewicz; Beata Syta
5	K. Neelima Chowdary; Manjusha Pavangadkar	2 – 0	Katarzyna Krasowska; Joanna Szleszyńska

Italy
4
Průhonice Hall
19 February 1996

Israel
1

		Result
1	Beate Dejaco	1 – 2	Svetlana Zilberman
2	Monica Memoli	2 – 0	Sigalit Moses
3	Yuyu Wang	2 – 0	Ira Srabrinski
4	Beate Dejaco; Maria Luisa Mur	1 – 2	Sigalit Moses; Svetlana Zilberman
5	Barbara Faiazza; Yuyu Wang	2 – 0	Shoshana Moses; Ira Srabrinski

Poland
5
Průhonice Hall
19 February 1996

Israel
0

		Result
1	Katarzyna Krasowska	2 – 0	Svetlana Zilberman
2	Joanna Szleszyńska	2 – 0	Sigalit Moses
3	Dorota Borek	2 – 0	Shoshana Moses
4	Sylwia Rutkiewicz; Beata Syta	2 – 1	Sigalit Moses; Svetlana Zilberman
5	Katarzyna Krasowska; Joanna Szleszyńska	2 – 0	Shoshana Moses; Ira Srabrinski

India
4
Průhonice Hall
19 February 1996

South Africa
1

		Result
1	P. V. V. Lakshmi	2 – 0	Lina Fourie
2	Manjusha Pavangadkar	2 – 0	Tracey Thompson
3	K. Neelima Chowdary	2 – 0	Monique Till
4	P. V. V. Lakshmi; P. V. Sharada	1 – 2	Lina Fourie; Tracey Thompson
5	K. Neelima Chowdary; Manjusha Pavangadkar	2 – 1	Linda Montignies; Monique Till

South Africa
4
Průhonice Hall
20 February 1996

Italy
1

		Result
1	Lina Fourie	2 – 0	Beate Dejaco
2	Tracey Thompson	2 – 1	Monica Memoli
3	Monique Till	1 – 2	Yuyu Wang
4	Lina Fourie; Tracey Thompson	2 – 0	Monica Memoli; Maria Luisa Mur
5	Linda Montignies; Monique Till	2 – 1	Beate Dejaco; Yuyu Wang

India
5
Průhonice Hall
20 February 1996

Israel
0

		Result
1	P. V. V. Lakshmi	2 – 0	Svetlana Zilberman
2	Manjusha Pavangadkar	2 – 0	Sigalit Moses
3	Aparna Popat	2 – 0	Shoshana Moses
4	P. V. V. Lakshmi; P. V. Sharada	2 – 0	Sigalit Moses; Svetlana Zilberman
5	K. Neelima Chowdary; Manjusha Pavangadkar	2 – 0	Shoshana Moses; Ira Srabrinski

==== Group C ====
Pos	Team	Pld	W	L	MF	MA	MD	Pts	Qualification
1	Ukraine	2	2	0	9	1	+8	2	Advance to second round
2	United States	2	1	1	5	5	0	1	
3	Mauritius	2	0	2	1	9	−8	0	
4	Nepal	0	0	0	0	0	0	0	Withdrew

Source: International Badminton Federation

United States
5
Průhonice Hall
18 February 1996

Mauritius
0

		Result
1	Yeping Tang	2 – 0 (11–1, 11–6)	Martine de Souza
2	Kathy Zimmerman	2 – 0 (11–5, 11–1)	Marie-Josephe Jean-Pierre
3	Erika von Heiland	2 – 0 (11–1, 11–5)	Vandanah Seesurun
4	Ann French; Yeping Tang	2 – 0 (15–5, 15–6)	Martine de Souza; Marie-Josephe Jean-Pierre
5	Stefanie Westermann; Kathy Zimmerman	2 – 0 (15–0, 15–4)	Selvon Marudamuthu; Vandanah Seesurun

Ukraine
5
Průhonice Hall
18 February 1996

Mauritius
0

		Result
1	Elena Nozdran	2 – 0	Martine de Souza
2	Victoria Evtoushenko	2 – 0	Marie-Josephe Jean-Pierre
3	Natalia Esipenko	2 – 0	Vandanah Seesurun
4	Victoria Evtoushenko; Elena Nozdran	2 – 0	Martine de Souza; Marie-Josephe Jean-Pierre
5	Natalia Atraschenkova; Natalia Esipenko	2 – 0	Selvon Marudamuthu; Vandanah Seesurun

Ukraine
5
Průhonice Hall
20 February 1996

United States
0

		Result
1	Elena Nozdran	2 – 0 (11–1, 11–6)	Yeping Tang
2	Victoria Evtoushenko	2 – 0 (11–3, 11–7)	Kathy Zimmerman
3	Natalia Esipenko	2 – 0 (11–1, 11–2)	Erika von Heiland
4	Victoria Evtoushenko; Elena Nozdran	2 – 1 (3–15, 15–5, 15–11)	Ann French; Yeping Tang
5	Natalia Atraschenkova; Natalia Esipenko	2 – 0 (15–9, 18–14)	Stefanie Westermann; Kathy Zimmerman

==== Group D ====
Pos	Team	Pld	W	L	MF	MA	MD	Pts	Qualification
1	Scotland	3	3	0	15	0	+15	3	Advance to second round
2	Iceland	3	2	1	9	6	+3	2	
3	Czech Republic	3	1	2	6	10	−4	1	
4	Lithuania	3	0	3	0	15	−15	0	

Source: International Badminton Federation

Scotland
3
Průhonice Hall
18 February 1996

Iceland
2

		Result
1	Anne Gibson	2 – 0	Elsa Nielsen
2	Gillian Martin	2 – 0	Vigdís Ásgeirsdóttir
3	Elinor Middlemiss	2 – 0	Brynja Pétursdóttir
4	Jillian Haldane; Elinor Middlemiss	2 – 0	Vigdís Ásgeirsdóttir; Elsa Nielsen
5	Alexis Blanchflower; Sandra Watt	2 – 0	Guðrún Júlíusdóttir; Birna Petersen

Czech Republic
5
Průhonice Hall
18 February 1996

Lithuania
0

		Result
1	Markéta Koudelková	2 – 0	Rasa Mikšytė
2	Jitka Lacinová	2 – 0	Indrė Ivanauskaitė
3	Eva Lacinová	2 – 0	Jūratė Prevelienė
4	Ludmila Bášová; Markéta Koudelková	2 – 0	Indrė Ivanauskaitė; Rasa Mikšytė
5	Eva Lacinová; Jitka Lacinová	2 – 0	Danguolė Blevaitienė; Jūratė Prevelienė

Scotland
5
Průhonice Hall
19 February 1996

Lithuania
0

		Result
1	Anne Gibson	2 – 0	Rasa Mikšytė
2	Gillian Martin	2 – 0	Indrė Ivanauskaitė
3	Elinor Middlemiss	2 – 0	Jūratė Prevelienė
4	Jillian Haldane; Elinor Middlemiss	2 – 0	Indrė Ivanauskaitė; Rasa Mikšytė
5	Alexis Blanchflower; Sandra Watt	2 – 0	Danguolė Blevaitienė; Jūratė Prevelienė

Czech Republic
1
Průhonice Hall
19 February 1996

Iceland
4

		Result
1	Markéta Koudelková	2 – 1	Elsa Nielsen
2	Hanna Procházková	1 – 2	Vigdís Ásgeirsdóttir
3	Jarka Nováková	1 – 2	Brynja Pétursdóttir
4	Ludmila Bášová; Markéta Koudelková	1 – 2	Vigdís Ásgeirsdóttir; Elsa Nielsen
5	Jitka Lacinová; Jarka Nováková	0 – 2	Guðrún Júlíusdóttir; Birna Petersen

Scotland
5
Průhonice Hall
20 February 1996

Czech Republic
0

		Result
1	Anne Gibson	2 – 0	Markéta Koudelková
2	Gillian Martin	2 – 0	Hanna Procházková
3	Elinor Middlemiss	2 – 0	Jarka Nováková
4	Kirsteen McEwan; Elinor Middlemiss	2 – 0	Ludmila Bášová; Markéta Koudelková
5	Alexis Blanchflower; Sandra Watt	2 – 0	Jitka Lacinová; Jarka Nováková

Iceland
5
Průhonice Hall
20 February 1996

Lithuania
0

		Result
1	Elsa Nielsen	2 – 0 (11–3, 11–1)	Rasa Mikšytė
2	Vigdís Ásgeirsdóttir	2 – 0 (11–0, 11–4)	Indrė Ivanauskaitė
3	Brynja Pétursdóttir	2 – 0 (11–4, 11–3)	Jūratė Prevelienė
4	Vigdís Ásgeirsdóttir; Elsa Nielsen	2 – 0 (15–2, 15–4)	Indrė Ivanauskaitė; Rasa Mikšytė
5	Guðrún Júlíusdóttir; Birna Petersen	2 – 0 (15–6, 15–3)	Danguolė Blevaitienė; Jūratė Prevelienė

==== Group E ====
Pos	Team	Pld	W	L	MF	MA	MD	Pts	Qualification
1	Bulgaria	3	3	0	15	0	+15	3	Advance to second round
2	Belgium	3	2	1	7	8	−1	2	
3	Slovakia	3	1	2	4	11	−7	1	
4	Cyprus	3	0	3	4	11	−7	0	

Source: International Badminton Federation

Bulgaria
5
Průhonice Hall
18 February 1996

Slovakia
0

		Result
1	Neli Nedyalkova	2 – 0	Alexandra Felgrová
2	Diana Koleva	2 – 0	Ľuba Hanzušová
3	Victoria Hristova	2 – 0	Dana Tomášová
4	Diana Koleva; Neli Nedyalkova	2 – 0	Alexandra Felgrová; Katarína Pokorná
5	Dimitriyka Dimitrova; Victoria Hristova	2 – 0	Ľuba Hanzušová; Dana Tomášová

Belgium
3
Průhonice Hall
18 February 1996

Cyprus
2

		Result
1	Peggy Mampaey	1 – 2	Diana Knekna
2	Mallory Gosset	2 – 0	Christina Christofia
3	Caroline Persyn	2 – 0	Maria Iasonos
4	Mallory Gosset; Caroline Persyn	1 – 2	Demetra Ioannou; Diana Knekna
5	Annemie Buyse; Heidi Vrancken	2 – 1	Christina Christofia; Maria Iasonos

Bulgaria
5
Průhonice Hall
19 February 1996

Cyprus
0

		Result
1	Neli Nedyalkova	2 – 0	Diana Knekna
2	Diana Koleva	2 – 0	Christina Christofia
3	Victoria Hristova	2 – 0	Maria Iasonos
4	Diana Koleva; Neli Nedyalkova	2 – 0	Demetra Ioannou; Diana Knekna
5	Dimitriyka Dimitrova; Victoria Hristova	2 – 0	Christina Christofia; Maria Iasonos

Belgium
4
Průhonice Hall
19 February 1996

Slovakia
1

		Result
1	Peggy Mampaey	2 – 1	Alexandra Felgrová
2	Mallory Gosset	2 – 0	Ľuba Hanzušová
3	Caroline Persyn	2 – 0	Dana Tomášová
4	Mallory Gosset; Caroline Persyn	1 – 2	Alexandra Felgrová; Katarína Pokorná
5	Annemie Buyse; Heidi Vrancken	2 – 0	Ľuba Hanzušová; Dana Tomášová

Bulgaria
5
Průhonice Hall
20 February 1996

Belgium
0

		Result
1	Neli Nedyalkova	2 – 0	Mallory Gosset
2	Diana Koleva	2 – 0	Caroline Persyn
3	Victoria Hristova	2 – 0	Anetha Stamboliyska
4	Diana Koleva; Neli Nedyalkova	2 – 0	Peggy Mampaey; Caroline Persyn
5	Dimitriyka Dimitrova; Victoria Hristova	2 – 0	Mallory Gosset; Anetha Stamboliyska

Slovakia
3
Průhonice Hall
20 February 1996

Cyprus
2

		Result
1	Alexandra Felgrová	1 – 2	Diana Knekna
2	Ľuba Hanzušová	2 – 0	Christina Christofia
3	Dana Tomášová	2 – 1	Maria Iasonos
4	Alexandra Felgrová; Katarína Pokorná	1 – 2	Demetra Ioannou; Diana Knekna
5	Ľuba Hanzušová; Dana Tomášová	2 – 1	Christina Christofia; Maria Iasonos

==== Group F ====
Pos	Team	Pld	W	L	MF	MA	MD	Pts	Qualification
1	Hungary	2	2	0	10	0	+10	2	Advance to second round
2	Finland	2	1	1	3	7	−4	1	
3	Portugal	2	0	2	2	8	−6	0	
4	Pakistan	0	0	0	0	0	0	0	Withdrew

Source: International Badminton Federation

Hungary
5
Průhonice Hall
18 February 1996

Portugal
0

		Result
1	Andrea Ódor	2 – 0	Helena Berimbau
2	Adrienn Kocsis	2 – 0	Ana Ferreira
3	Andrea Harsági	2 – 0	Francis Pereira
4	Andrea Dakó; Adrienn Kocsis	2 – 0	Ana Ferreira; Sonia Lopes
5	Andrea Harsági; Melinda Keszthelyi	2 – 0	Helena Berimbau; Francis Pereira

Finland
3
Průhonice Hall
18 February 1996

Portugal
2

		Result
1	Anu Weckström	1 – 2 (4–11, 11–0, 3–11)	Helena Berimbau
2	Sara Ussher	0 – 2 (2–11, 2–11)	Ana Ferreira
3	Malin Virta	2 – 0 (11–3, 11–4)	Francis Pereira
4	Nadja Hämäläinen; Malin Virta	2 – 0 (15–6, 18–16)	Ana Ferreira; Sonia Lopes
5	Marjaana Moilanen; Anu Weckström	2 – 0 (15–3, 15–5)	Helena Berimbau; Francis Pereira

Finland
0
Průhonice Hall
19 February 1996

Hungary
5

		Result
1	Anu Weckström	1 – 2 (7–11, 11–7, 6–11)	Andrea Ódor
2	Sara Ussher	0 – 2 (2–11, 5–11)	Adrienn Kocsis
3	Malin Virta	1 – 2 (5–11, 11–7, 9–12)	Andrea Harsági
4	Nadja Hämäläinen; Malin Virta	0 – 2 (3–15, 6–15)	Andrea Dakó; Adrienn Kocsis
5	Marjaana Moilanen; Anu Weckström	0 – 2 (8–15, 6–15)	Andrea Harsági; Melinda Keszthelyi

==== Group G ====
Pos	Team	Pld	W	L	MF	MA	MD	Pts	Qualification
1	Wales	3	3	0	11	4	+7	3	Advance to second round
2	Slovenia	3	2	1	8	6	+2	2	
3	Austria	3	1	2	6	9	−3	1	
4	Spain	3	0	3	5	10	−5	0	

Source: International Badminton Federation

Wales
3
Průhonice Hall
18 February 1996

Slovenia
2

		Result
1	Kelly Morgan	2 – 0	Maja Pohar
2	Katie Howell	1 – 2	Mateja Slatnar
3	Ruth Gardner	1 – 2	Darja Kranjc
4	Kelly Morgan; Rachael Phipps	2 – 0	Tinka Pelhan; Maja Pohar
5	Natasha Groves-Burke; Sarah Williams	2 – 0	Darja Kranjc; Mateja Slatnar

Austria
3
Průhonice Hall
18 February 1996

Spain
2

		Result
1	Verena Fastenbauer	1 – 2	Dolores Marco
2	Manuela Lassinger	1 – 2	Esther Sanz
3	Elke Lengauer	2 – 1	Patricia Pérez
4	Sabine Aberer; Verena Fastenbauer	2 – 1	Dolores Marco; Esther Sanz
5	Manuela Lassinger; Bettina Weilguni	2 – 0	Patricia Pérez; María Torres

Wales
4
Průhonice Hall
19 February 1996

Spain
1

		Result
1	Kelly Morgan	2 – 0	Dolores Marco
2	Katie Howell	1 – 2	Esther Sanz
3	Ruth Gardner	2 – 1	Patricia Pérez
4	Kelly Morgan; Rachael Phipps	2 – 1	Dolores Marco; Esther Sanz
5	Natasha Groves-Burke; Sarah Williams	2 – 0	Patricia Pérez; María Torres

Austria
2
Průhonice Hall
19 February 1996

Slovenia
3

		Result
1	Verena Fastenbauer	1 – 2	Maja Pohar
2	Manuela Lassinger	1 – 2	Mateja Slatnar
3	Elke Lengauer	2 – 1	Darja Kranjc
4	Sabine Aberer; Verena Fastenbauer	2 – 1	Tinka Pelhan; Maja Pohar
5	Manuela Lassinger; Bettina Weilguni	1 – 2	Darja Kranjc; Mateja Slatnar

Wales
4
Průhonice Hall
20 February 1996

Austria
1

		Result
1	Kelly Morgan	2 – 0	Verena Fastenbauer
2	Katie Howell	1 – 2	Elke Lengauer
3	Ruth Gardner	2 – 1	Bettina Weilguni
4	Kelly Morgan; Rachael Phipps	2 – 0	Sabine Aberer; Verena Fastenbauer
5	Natasha Groves-Burke; Sarah Williams	2 – 1	Manuela Lassinger; Bettina Weilguni

Slovenia
3
Průhonice Hall
20 February 1996

Spain
2

		Result
1	Maja Pohar	2 – 1	Dolores Marco
2	Mateja Slatnar	1 – 2	Esther Sanz
3	Darja Kranjc	2 – 1	Patricia Pérez
4	Tinka Pelhan; Maja Pohar	1 – 2	Dolores Marco; Esther Sanz
5	Darja Kranjc; Mateja Slatnar	2 – 0	Patricia Pérez; María Torres

=== Second round ===
==== Group W ====
Pos	Team	Pld	W	L	MF	MA	MD	Pts	Qualification
1	Denmark	3	3	0	13	2	+11	3	Advance to knockout stage
2	India	3	2	1	7	8	−1	2	
3	Scotland	3	1	2	7	8	−1	1	
4	Wales	3	0	3	3	12	−9	0	

Source: International Badminton Federation

Denmark
4
Průhonice Hall
21 February 1996

India
1

		Result
1	Camilla Martin	2 – 0 (11–4, 11–0)	P. V. V. Lakshmi
2	Lotte Thomsen	0 – 2 (5–11, 7–11)	Manjusha Pavangadkar
3	Anne Søndergaard	2 – 0 (11–5, 11–5)	Aparna Popat
4	Helene Kirkegaard; Rikke Olsen	2 – 0 (15–2, 15–1)	P. V. V. Lakshmi; P. V. Sharada
5	Ann Jørgensen; Lotte Olsen	2 – 0 (15–1, 15–4)	K. Neelima Chowdary; Manjusha Pavangadkar

Scotland
4
Průhonice Hall
21 February 1996

Wales
1

		Result
1	Anne Gibson	0 – 2 (8–11, 8–11)	Kelly Morgan
2	Gillian Martin	2 – 0 (11–2, 11–4)	Katie Howell
3	Elinor Middlemiss	2 – 0 (11–5, 11–6)	Ruth Gardner
4	Jillian Haldane; Elinor Middlemiss	2 – 0 (15–0, 15–9)	Kelly Morgan; Rachael Phipps
5	Alexis Blanchflower; Sandra Watt	2 – 0 (15–2, 15–5)	Natasha Groves-Burke; Sarah Williams

Denmark
5
Průhonice Hall
22 February 1994

Wales
0

		Result
1	Camilla Martin	2 – 0	Kelly Morgan
2	Lotte Thomsen	2 – 0	Katie Howell
3	Anne Søndergaard	2 – 0	Ruth Gardner
4	Helene Kirkegaard; Rikke Olsen	2 – 0	Kelly Morgan; Rachael Phipps
5	Ann Jørgensen; Lotte Olsen	2 – 0	Natasha Groves-Burke; Sarah Williams

Scotland
2
Průhonice Hall
22 February 1996

India
3

		Result
1	Anne Gibson	1 – 2	P. V. V. Lakshmi
2	Gillian Martin	0 – 2	Manjusha Pavangadkar
3	Elinor Middlemiss	1 – 2	Aparna Popat
4	Jillian Haldane; Elinor Middlemiss	2 – 0	P. V. V. Lakshmi; P. V. Sharada
5	Alexis Blanchflower; Sandra Watt	2 – 1	K. Neelima Chowdary; Manjusha Pavangadkar

Denmark
5
Průhonice Hall
23 February 1996

Scotland
0

		Result
1	Lotte Thomsen	2 – 1 (11–6, 6–11, 11–4)	Anne Gibson
2	Anne Søndergaard	2 – 0 (11–5, 11–3)	Gillian Martin
3	Mette Pedersen	2 – 0 (11–1, 11–3)	Elinor Middlemiss
4	Ann Jørgensen; Lotte Olsen	2 – 0 (15–4, 15–4)	Jillian Haldane; Elinor Middlemiss
5	Helene Kirkegaard; Rikke Olsen	2 – 0 (15–9, 15–5)	Alexis Blanchflower; Anne Gibson

India
3
Průhonice Hall
23 February 1996

Wales
2

		Result
1	P. V. V. Lakshmi	1 – 2	Kelly Morgan
2	Manjusha Pavangadkar	2 – 0	Katie Howell
3	Aparna Popat	2 – 0	Ruth Gardner
4	P. V. V. Lakshmi; P. V. Sharada	1 – 2	Kelly Morgan; Rachael Phipps
5	K. Neelima Chowdary; Manjusha Pavangadkar	2 – 1	Natasha Groves-Burke; Sarah Williams

==== Group X ====
Pos	Team	Pld	W	L	MF	MA	MD	Pts	Qualification
1	England	3	3	0	13	2	+11	3	Advance to knockout stage
2	Canada	3	2	1	10	5	+5	2	
3	France	3	1	2	3	12	−9	1	
4	Bulgaria	3	0	3	4	11	−7	0	

Source: International Badminton Federation

England
5
Průhonice Hall
21 February 1996

France
0

		Result
1	Julia Mann	2 – 0	Sandra Dimbour
2	Alison Humby	2 – 0	Christelle Mol
3	Tanya Groves	2 – 0	Sandrine Lefèvre
4	Julie Bradbury; Joanne Muggeridge	0 – 2	Christelle Mol; Tatiana Vattier
5	Gillian Gowers; Sarah Hardaker	2 – 0	Virginie Delvingt; Sandrine Lefèvre

Canada
4
Průhonice Hall
21 February 1996

Bulgaria
1

		Result
1	Denyse Julien	2 – 0	Neli Nedyalkova
2	Doris Piché	2 – 1	Diana Koleva
3	Charmaine Reid	2 – 1	Victoria Hristova
4	Milaine Cloutier; Robbyn Hermitage	2 – 0	Diana Koleva; Neli Nedyalkova
5	Elma Ong; Moira Ong	1 – 2	Dimitriyka Dimitrova; Victoria Hristova

England
4
Průhonice Hall
22 February 1996

Bulgaria
1

		Result
1	Joanne Muggeridge	1 – 2	Neli Nedyalkova
2	Julia Mann	2 – 0	Diana Koleva
3	Alison Humby	1 – 2	Victoria Hristova
4	Julie Bradbury; Joanne Muggeridge	2 – 0	Diana Koleva; Neli Nedyalkova
5	Gillian Gowers; Sarah Hardaker	2 – 0	Dimitriyka Dimitrova; Victoria Hristova

Canada
5
Průhonice Hall
22 February 1996

France
0

		Result
1	Denyse Julien	2 – 0	Sandra Dimbour
2	Doris Piché	2 – 1	Christelle Mol
3	Charmaine Reid	2 – 1	Sandrine Lefèvre
4	Milaine Cloutier; Robbyn Hermitage	2 – 0	Christelle Mol; Tatiana Vattier
5	Elma Ong; Moira Ong	2 – 1	Virginie Delvingt; Sandrine Lefèvre

England
4
Průhonice Hall
23 February 1996

Canada
1

		Result
1	Julia Mann	1 – 2	Denyse Julien
2	Alison Humby	2 – 1	Doris Piché
3	Tanya Groves	2 – 0	Moira Ong
4	Julie Bradbury; Joanne Muggeridge	0 – 2	Milaine Cloutier; Robbyn Hermitage
5	Gillian Gowers; Sarah Hardaker	2 – 0	Heather Ostrom; Charmaine Reid

France
3
Průhonice Hall
23 February 1996

Bulgaria
2

		Result
1	Sandra Dimbour	1 – 2	Neli Nedyalkova
2	Christelle Mol	1 – 2	Diana Koleva
3	Sandrine Lefèvre	2 – 1	Victoria Hristova
4	Christelle Mol; Tatiana Vattier	2 – 1	Diana Koleva; Neli Nedyalkova
5	Virginie Delvingt; Sandrine Lefèvre	2 – 1	Dimitriyka Dimitrova; Victoria Hristova

==== Group Y ====
Pos	Team	Pld	W	L	MF	MA	MD	Pts	Qualification
1	Russia	3	3	0	11	4	+7	3	Advance to knockout stage
2	Netherlands	3	2	1	10	5	+5	2	
3	Germany	3	1	2	6	9	−3	1	
4	Belarus	3	0	3	2	13	−11	0	

Source: International Badminton Federation

Netherlands
4
Průhonice Hall
21 February 1996

Belarus
1

		Result
1	Carolien Glebbeek	0 – 2 (2–11, 10–12)	Vlada Chernyavskaya
2	Brenda Beenhakker	2 – 0 (11–3, 11–2)	Tatiana Gerassimovitch
3	Judith Meulendijks	2 – 0 (11–7, 11–0)	Olga Ilioushchenkova
4	Eline Coene; Erica van den Heuvel	2 – 0 (17–14, 15–9)	Vlada Chernyavskaya; Tatiana Gerassimovitch
5	Brenda Conijn; Nicole van Hooren	2 – 0 (15–5, 15–10)	Irina Gourina; Olga Ilioushchenkova

Russia
3
Průhonice Hall
21 February 1996

Germany
2

		Result
1	Elena Rybkina	1 – 2	Stefanie Müller
2	Marina Yakusheva	2 – 0	Heike Schönharting
3	Elena Sukhareva	2 – 0	Nicole Baldewein
4	Elena Rybkina; Marina Yakusheva	1 – 2	Katrin Schmidt; Kersten Ubben
5	Nadezhda Chervyakova; Ella Karachkova	2 – 0	Nicole Baldewein; Heike Schönharting

Netherlands
2
Průhonice Hall
22 February 1996

Russia
3

		Result
1	Carolien Glebbeek	0 – 2 (8–11, 3–11)	Elena Rybkina
2	Brenda Beenhakker	0 – 2 (6–11, 2–11)	Marina Yakusheva
3	Judith Meulendijks	1 – 2 (11–2, 5–11, 4–11)	Elena Sukhareva
4	Eline Coene; Erica van den Heuvel	2 – 1 (15–12, 13–15, 15–7)	Elena Rybkina; Marina Yakusheva
5	Brenda Conijn; Nicole van Hooren	2 – 1 (15–9, 14–18, 15–10)	Nadezhda Chervyakova; Ella Karachkova

Germany
4
Průhonice Hall
22 February 1996

Belarus
1

		Result
1	Stefanie Müller	1 – 2	Vlada Chernyavskaya
2	Heike Schönharting	2 – 0	Tatiana Gerassimovitch
3	Nicole Baldewein	2 – 0	Olga Ilioushchenkova
4	Katrin Schmidt; Kersten Ubben	2 – 0	Vlada Chernyavskaya; Tatiana Gerassimovitch
5	Nicole Baldewein; Heike Schönharting	2 – 1	Irina Gourina; Olga Ilioushchenkova

Netherlands
4
Průhonice Hall
23 February 1996

Germany
1

		Result
1	Carolien Glebbeek	0 – 2	Stefanie Müller
2	Brenda Beenhakker	2 – 0	Heike Schönharting
3	Judith Meulendijks	2 – 1	Nicole Baldewein
4	Eline Coene; Erica van den Heuvel	2 – 0	Katrin Schmidt; Kersten Ubben
5	Brenda Conijn; Nicole van Hooren	2 – 0	Nicole Baldewein; Heike Schönharting

Russia
5
Průhonice Hall
23 February 1996

Belarus
0

		Result
1	Elena Rybkina	2 – 1	Vlada Chernyavskaya
2	Marina Yakusheva	2 – 0	Tatiana Gerassimovitch
3	Elena Sukhareva	2 – 0	Olga Ilioushchenkova
4	Elena Rybkina; Marina Yakusheva	2 – 0	Vlada Chernyavskaya; Tatiana Gerassimovitch
5	Nadezhda Chervyakova; Ella Karachkova	2 – 0	Irina Gourina; Olga Ilioushchenkova

==== Group Z ====
Pos	Team	Pld	W	L	MF	MA	MD	Pts	Qualification
1	Sweden	3	3	0	14	1	+13	3	Advance to knockout stage
2	Ukraine	3	2	1	12	3	+9	2	
3	Switzerland	3	1	2	5	10	−5	1	
4	Hungary	3	0	3	2	13	−11	0	

Source: International Badminton Federation

Sweden
5
Průhonice Hall
21 February 1996

Switzerland
0

		Result
1	Catrine Bengtsson	2 – 0 (12–11, 11–5)	Silvia Albrecht
2	Christine Magnusson	2 – 0 (11–0, 11–2)	Santi Wibowo
3	Karolina Ericsson	2 – 0 (11–2, 11–0)	Judith Baumeyer
4	Maria Bengtsson; Margit Borg	2 – 0 (15–8, 15–1)	Silvia Albrecht; Santi Wibowo
5	Kristin Evernäs; Johanna Holgersson	2 – 0 (15–8, 15–2)	Fabienne Baumeyer; Judith Baumeyer

Hungary
1
Průhonice Hall
21 February 1996

Ukraine
4

		Result
1	Adrienn Kocsis	0 – 2	Elena Nozdran
2	Melinda Keszthelyi	0 – 2	Natalia Esipenko
3	Andrea Harsági	2 – 1	Victoria Kobylka
4	Andrea Dakó; Adrienn Kocsis	0 – 2	Victoria Evtoushenko; Elena Nozdran
5	Andrea Harsági; Melinda Keszthelyi	0 – 2	Natalia Atraschenkova; Natalia Esipenko

Sweden
4
Průhonice Hall
22 February 1996

Ukraine
1

		Result
1	Catrine Bengtsson	2 – 0	Elena Nozdran
2	Christine Magnusson	2 – 0	Natalia Esipenko
3	Karolina Ericsson	2 – 0	Victoria Kobylka
4	Catrine Bengtsson; Christine Magnusson	2 – 0	Victoria Evtoushenko; Elena Nozdran
5	Kristin Evernäs; Johanna Holgersson	1 – 2	Natalia Atraschenkova; Natalia Esipenko

Hungary
1
Průhonice Hall
22 February 1996

Switzerland
4

		Result
1	Adrienn Kocsis	0 – 2 (4–11, 1–11)	Silvia Albrecht
2	Melinda Keszthelyi	0 – 2 (1–11, 1–11)	Santi Wibowo
3	Andrea Harsági	2 – 0 (11–3, 11–1)	Judith Baumeyer
4	Andrea Dakó; Adrienn Kocsis	0 – 2 (6–15, 4–15)	Silvia Albrecht; Santi Wibowo
5	Andrea Harsági; Melinda Keszthelyi	0 – 2 (8–15, 6–15)	Fabienne Baumeyer; Judith Baumeyer

Sweden
5
Průhonice Hall
23 February 1996

Hungary
0

		Result
1	Catrine Bengtsson	2 – 0	Andrea Ódor
2	Christine Magnusson	2 – 0	Adrienn Kocsis
3	Karolina Ericsson	2 – 0	Andrea Harsági
4	Catrine Bengtsson; Christine Magnusson	2 – 0	Andrea Dakó; Adrienn Kocsis
5	Kristin Evernäs; Johanna Holgersson	2 – 0	Andrea Harsági; Melinda Keszthelyi

Switzerland
1
Průhonice Hall
23 February 1996

Ukraine
4

		Result
1	Silvia Albrecht	0 – 2 (2–11, 7–11)	Elena Nozdran
2	Santi Wibowo	2 – 0 (12–10, 11–5)	Natalia Esipenko
3	Judith Baumeyer	1 – 2 (5–11, 11–2, 10–12)	Victoria Kobylka
4	Silvia Albrecht; Santi Wibowo	0 – 2 (4–15, 7–15)	Victoria Evtoushenko; Elena Nozdran
5	Fabienne Baumeyer; Judith Baumeyer	0 – 2 (12–15, 8–15)	Natalia Atraschenkova; Natalia Esipenko

=== Knockout stage ===
Semi-finals
Denmark	5
England	0
Russia	2
Sweden	3

Final
Denmark	5
Russia	0
Third place
England	3
Sweden	2

==== Semi-finals ====
Denmark
5
Průhonice Hall
24 February 1996

England
0

		Result
1	Camilla Martin	2 – 0	Julia Mann
2	Lotte Thomsen	2 – 0	Alison Humby
3	Anne Søndergaard	2 – 1	Tanya Groves
4	Helene Kirkegaard; Rikke Olsen	2 – 0	Julie Bradbury; Joanne Muggeridge
5	Ann Jørgensen; Lotte Olsen	2 – 0	Gillian Gowers; Sarah Hardaker

Sweden
2
Průhonice Hall
24 February 1996

Russia
3

		Result
1	Catrine Bengtsson	1 – 2 (11–5, 2–11, 10–12)	Elena Rybkina
2	Christine Magnusson	0 – 2 (3–11, 6–11)	Marina Yakusheva
3	Karolina Ericsson	2 – 0 (11–7, 11–5)	Elena Sukhareva
4	Catrine Bengtsson; Christine Magnusson	2 – 0 (15–5, 15–11)	Nadezhda Chervyakova; Ella Karachkova
5	Maria Bengtsson; Margit Borg	2 – 0 (14–17, 8–15)	Elena Rybkina; Marina Yakusheva

==== Third place ====
England
3
Průhonice Hall
25 February 1996

Sweden
2

		Result
1	Joanne Muggeridge	2 – 0 (11–7, 11–6)	Catrine Bengtsson
2	Julia Mann	0 – 2 (4–11, 8–11)	Christine Magnusson
3	Alison Humby	2 – 0 (11–4, 11–3)	Margit Borg
4	Julie Bradbury; Joanne Muggeridge	2 – 0 (15–4, 15–10)	Maria Bengtsson; Margit Borg
5	Nichola Beck; Joanne Davies	0 – 2 (10–15, 7–15)	Catrine Bengtsson; Christine Magnusson

==== Final ====
Denmark
5
Průhonice Hall
25 February 1996

Russia
0

		Result
1	Camilla Martin	2 – 0 (11–2, 11–5)	Elena Sukhareva
2	Anne Søndergaard	2 – 0 (11–6, 11–6)	Natalia Gorodnicheva
3	Mette Pedersen	2 – 0 (11–5, 11–3)	Ella Karachkova
4	Helene Kirkegaard; Rikke Olsen	2 – 0 (15–5, 15–4)	Nadezhda Chervyakova; Ella Karachkova
5	Ann Jørgensen; Lotte Olsen	2 – 0 (15–1, 15–2)	Natalia Gorodnicheva; Elena Sukhareva
