= 1998 Uber Cup qualification =

Tournament details
- Dates: 14–22 February 1998
- Location: Asian zone: Manila; European zone: Sandefjord

The qualifying process for the 1998 Uber Cup took place from 14 to 22 February 1998 to decide the final teams which would play in the final tournament.

== Qualification process ==
The qualification process was divided into two regions, the Asian Zone and the European Zone. Seeded teams received a bye into the second round while unseeded teams competed in the first round for a place in the second round. The first two rounds were played in a round-robin format. Teams in the second round competed for a place in the knockout stages. Semi-final winners in each zone were guaranteed qualification for the final tournament to be held in Hong Kong while the remaining teams competed in a third place playoff match for a place in the final tournament.

Indonesia qualified for the final tournament as defending champions while Hong Kong qualified as hosts.

=== Qualified teams ===
Country	Qualified as	Qualified on	Final appearance
Hong Kong	1998 Uber Cup hosts	December 1996	2nd
Indonesia	1996 Uber Cup winners	24 May 1996	15th
China	Asian Zone winners	22 February 1998	8th
South Korea	Asian Zone runners-up	22 February 1998	8th
Japan	Third place in Asian Zone	22 February 1998	13th
Denmark	European Zone winners	21 February 1998	11th
England	European Zone runners-up	21 February 1998	12th
Netherlands	Third place in European Zone	21 February 1998	4th

== Asian Zone ==
The qualification rounds for the Asian Zone were held from 15 to 22 February at the PhilSports Arena in Manila, Philippines. Thirteen teams took part in qualifying for the final tournament.

=== First round ===
==== Group A ====
Pos	Team	Pld	W	L	MF	MA	MD	Pts	Qualification
1	Singapore	3	3	0	13	2	+11	3	Advance to second round
2	Australia	3	2	1	9	6	+3	2	
3	Philippines	3	1	2	7	8	−1	1	
4	Mauritius	3	0	3	1	14	−13	0	
5	Macau	0	0	0	0	0	0	0	Withdrew

Source: International Badminton Federation

Australia
1
PhilSports Arena
15 February 1998

Singapore
4

		Result
1	Rhonda Cator	1 – 2 (11–8, 7–11, 10–12)	Wu Wenjing
2	Michaela Smith	0 – 2 (7–11, 4–11)	Zhou Qianmin
3	Kellie Lucas	0 – 2 (4–11, 0–11)	Zarinah Abdullah
4	Rhonda Cator; Kate Wilson-Smith	2 – 1 (7–15, 1–15)	Wu Wenjing; Zarinah Abdullah
5	Kellie Lucas; Michaela Smith	2 – 0 (15–9, 15–5)	Foo Shui Yen; Zhou Qianmin

Philippines
4
PhilSports Arena
15 February 1998

Mauritius
1

		Result
1	Amparo Lim	2 – 0 (11–2, 11–4)	Vandanah Seesurun
2	Kennie Asuncion	2 – 0 (11–1, 11–0)	Amrita Sawaram
3	Alma Ledesma	2 – 0 (12–10, 11–1)	Marie-Hélène Pierre
4	Maria Elena Garcia; Mylene Delgado	1 – 2 (15–12, 11–15, 8–15)	Selvon Marudamuthu; Amrita Sawaram
5	Kennie Asuncion; Amparo Lim	2 – 0 (15–5, 15–3)	Marie-Hélène Pierre; Vandanah Seesurun

Australia
3
PhilSports Arena
16 February 1998

Mauritius
2

		Result
1	Rhonda Cator	2 – 0	Vandanah Seesurun
2	Michaela Smith	2 – 0	Amrita Sawaram
3	Kellie Lucas	2 – 0	Marie-Hélène Pierre
4	Rhonda Cator; Kate Wilson-Smith	2 – 0	Selvon Marudamuthu; Amrita Sawaram
5	Kellie Lucas; Michaela Smith	2 – 0	Marie-Hélène Pierre; Vandanah Seesurun

Philippines
1
PhilSports Arena
16 February 1998

Singapore
4

		Result
1	Amparo Lim	0 – 2 (5–11, 1–11)	Zarinah Abdullah
2	Kennie Asuncion	1 – 2 (11–4, 1–11, 5–11)	Wu Wenjing
3	Alma Ledesma	0 – 2 (5–11, 6–11)	Zhou Qianmin
4	Kennie Asuncion; Amparo Lim	2 – 0 (15–3, 15–7)	Foo Shui Yen; Zarinah Abdullah
5	Maria Elena Garcia; Mylene Delgado	0 – 2 (4–15, 1–15)	Wu Wenjing; Zhou Qianmin

Australia
3
PhilSports Arena
17 February 1998

Philippines
2

		Result
1	Rhonda Cator	2 – 0	Amparo Lim
2	Michaela Smith	0 – 2	Kennie Asuncion
3	Kellie Lucas	2 – 0	Alma Ledesma
4	Rhonda Cator; Kate Wilson-Smith	2 – 0	Maria Elena Garcia; Mylene Delgado
5	Kellie Lucas; Michaela Smith	1 – 2	Kennie Asuncion; Amparo Lim

Singapore
5
PhilSports Arena
17 February 1998

Mauritius
0

		Result
1	Zarinah Abdullah	2 – 0 (11–0, 11–2)	Vandanah Seesurun
2	Wu Wenjing	2 – 0 (11–1, 11–1)	Amrita Sawaram
3	Foo Shui Yen	2 – 0 (11–2, 11–4)	Marie-Hélène Pierre
4	Zarinah Abdullah; Zhou Qianmin	2 – 0 (15–8, 15–1)	Marie-Hélène Pierre; Vandanah Seesurun
5	Toh Sock Hui; Wu Wenjing	2 – 0 (15–2, 15–3)	Selvon Marudamuthu; Amrita Sawaram

==== Group B ====
Pos	Team	Pld	W	L	MF	MA	MD	Pts	Qualification
1	Malaysia	2	2	0	9	1	+8	2	Advance to second round
2	India	2	1	1	6	4	+2	1	
3	Sri Lanka	2	0	2	0	10	−10	0	
4	Nigeria	0	0	0	0	0	0	0	Withdrew
5	Pakistan	0	0	0	0	0	0	0	Withdrew
6	Thailand	0	0	0	0	0	0	0	Withdrew

Source: International Badminton Federation

India
5
PhilSports Arena
15 February 1998

Sri Lanka
0

		Result
1	Aparna Popat	2 – 0	Chandrika de Silva
2	K. Neelima Chowdary	2 – 0	Dilhani de Silva
3	Manjusha Kanwar	2 – 0	Pameesha Dishanthi
4	Madhumita Bisht; P. V. V. Lakshmi	2 – 0	Chandrika de Silva; Inoka Rohini
5	Archana Deodhar; Manjusha Kanwar	2 – 0	Dilhani de Silva; Pameesha Dishanthi

Malaysia
5
PhilSports Arena
15 February 1998

Sri Lanka
0

		Result
1	Lee Yin Yin	2 – 0	Chandrika de Silva
2	Ishwarii Boopathy	2 – 0	Dilhani de Silva
3	Law Pei Pei	2 – 0	Pameesha Dishanthi
4	Chor Hooi Yee; Lim Pek Siah	2 – 0	Chandrika de Silva; Inoka Rohini
5	Norhasikin Amin; Joanne Quay	2 – 0	Dilhani de Silva; Pameesha Dishanthi

India
1
PhilSports Arena
16 February 1998

Malaysia
4

		Result
1	Aparna Popat	2 – 0 (12–10, 11–3)	Lee Yin Yin
2	K. Neelima Chowdary	1 – 2 (4–11, 12–9, 4–11)	Law Pei Pei
3	Manjusha Kanwar	0 – 2 (2–11, 5–11)	Woon Sze Mei
4	Madhumita Bisht; Sindhu Gulati	0 – 2 (12–15, 11–15)	Chor Hooi Yee; Lim Pek Siah
5	Archana Deodhar; Manjusha Kanwar	0 – 2 (11–15, 14–18)	Law Pei Pei; Norhasikin Amin

=== Second round ===
==== Group X ====
Pos	Team	Pld	W	L	MF	MA	MD	Pts	Qualification
1	China	3	3	0	15	0	+15	3	Advance to knockout stage
2	Japan	3	2	1	9	6	+3	2	Advance to knockout stage
3	New Zealand	3	1	2	4	11	−7	1	
4	Malaysia	3	0	3	2	13	−11	0	

Source: International Badminton Federation

China
5
PhilSports Arena
18 February 1998

Malaysia
0

		Result
1	Gong Zhichao	2 – 0	Lee Yin Yin
2	Dai Yun	2 – 0	Ishwarii Boopathy
3	Wang Chen	2 – 0	Woon Sze Mei
4	Ge Fei; Gu Jun	2 – 0	Chor Hooi Yee; Lim Pek Siah
5	Qin Yiyuan; Tang Yongshu	2 – 0	Norhasikin Amin; Joanne Quay

Japan
4
PhilSports Arena
18 February 1998

New Zealand
1

		Result
1	Kanako Yonekura	2 – 0	Li Feng
2	Yasuko Mizui	1 – 2	Rhona Robertson
3	Takako Ida	2 – 0	Rebecca Gordon
4	Yoshiko Iwata; Haruko Matsuda	2 – 1	Tammy Jenkins; Rhona Robertson
5	Saori Itō; Shizuka Yamamoto	2 – 0	Li Feng; Sheree Jefferson

China
5
PhilSports Arena
19 February 1998

New Zealand
0

		Result
1	Gong Zhichao	2 – 0	Rhona Robertson
2	Dai Yun	2 – 0	Rebecca Gordon
3	Wang Chen	2 – 0	Lianne Shirley
4	Ge Fei; Gu Jun	2 – 0	Tammy Jenkins; Rhona Robertson
5	Qin Yiyuan; Tang Yongshu	2 – 0	Rebecca Gordon; Lianne Shirley

Japan
3
PhilSports Arena
19 February 1998

Malaysia
2

		Result
1	Kanako Yonekura	2 – 0	Lee Yin Yin
2	Yasuko Mizui	2 – 0	Ishwarii Boopathy
3	Takako Ida	2 – 0	Law Pei Pei
4	Yoshiko Iwata; Haruko Matsuda	2 – 1	Chor Hooi Yee; Lim Pek Siah
5	Saori Itō; Shizuka Yamamoto	2 – 0	Norhasikin Amin; Joanne Quay

China
5
PhilSports Arena
20 February 1998

Japan
0

		Result
1	Gong Zhichao	2 – 0 (11–3, 11–7)	Yasuko Mizui
2	Dai Yun	2 – 0 (11–2, 12–10)	Takako Ida
3	Wang Chen	2 – 0 (11–7, 11–8)	Miho Tanaka
4	Ge Fei; Gu Jun	2 – 0 (15–3, 15–2)	Yoshiko Iwata; Haruko Matsuda
5	Qin Yiyuan; Tang Yongshu	2 – 0 (15–4, 15–4)	Shizuka Yamamoto; Kanako Yonekura

New Zealand
3
PhilSports Arena
20 February 1998

Malaysia
2

		Result
1	Li Feng	2 – 0	Lee Yin Yin
2	Rhona Robertson	2 – 0	Ishwarii Boopathy
3	Rebecca Gordon	2 – 1	Law Pei Pei
4	Tammy Jenkins; Rhona Robertson	1 – 2	Chor Hooi Yee; Lim Pek Siah
5	Li Feng; Sheree Jefferson	0 – 2	Norhasikin Amin; Joanne Quay

==== Group Y ====
Pos	Team	Pld	W	L	MF	MA	MD	Pts	Qualification
1	South Korea	3	3	0	15	0	+15	3	Advance to knockout stage
2	Chinese Taipei	3	2	1	10	5	+5	2	Advance to knockout stage
3	Canada	3	1	2	3	12	−9	1	
4	Singapore	3	0	3	2	13	−11	0	

Source: International Badminton Federation

South Korea
5
PhilSports Arena
18 February 1998

Singapore
0

		Result
1	Kim Ji-hyun	2 – 0 (11–5, 11–1)	Zarinah Abdullah
2	Lee Joo-hyun	2 – 1 (1–11, 11–2, 11–5)	Wu Wenjing
3	Lee Kyung-won	2 – 0 (11–3, 11–1)	Foo Shui Yen
4	Chung Jae-hee; Yim Kyung-jin	2 – 0 (15–3, 15–2)	Foo Shui Yen; Zhou Qianmin
5	Jang Hye-ock; Ra Kyung-min	2 – 0 (15–0, 15–0)	Tan Siew Lian; Toh Sock Hui

Chinese Taipei
5
PhilSports Arena
18 February 1998

Canada
0

		Result
1	Chan Ya-lin	2 – 0	Denyse Julien
2	Jeng Shwu-jen	2 – 0	Charmaine Reid
3	Kuo Ling-yan	2 – 0	Julia Chen
4	Chen Li-chin; Tsai Hui-min	2 – 0	Milaine Cloutier; Robbyn Hermitage
5	Chen Mei-jun; Chen Wan-ju	2 – 0	Denyse Julien; Charmaine Reid

South Korea
5
PhilSports Arena
19 February 1998

Canada
0

		Result
1	Kim Ji-hyun	2 – 0	Denyse Julien
2	Lee Joo-hyun	2 – 0	Charmaine Reid
3	Lee Kyung-won	2 – 0	Julia Chen
4	Chung Jae-hee; Yim Kyung-jin	2 – 0	Milaine Cloutier; Robbyn Hermitage
5	Jang Hye-ock; Ra Kyung-min	2 – 0	Denyse Julien; Charmaine Reid

Chinese Taipei
5
PhilSports Arena
19 February 1998

Singapore
0

		Result
1	Chan Ya-lin	2 – 0 (12–10, 12–10)	Zarinah Abdullah
2	Jeng Shwu-jen	2 – 1 (11–7, 6–11, 11–7)	Wu Wenjing
3	Kuo Ling-yan	2 – 0 (11–3, 11–0)	Zhou Qianmin
4	Chen Li-chin; Tsai Hui-min	2 – 0 (15–5, 15–6)	Wu Wenjing; Zarinah Abdullah
5	Chen Mei-jun; Chen Wan-ju	2 – 0 (15–5, 15–0)	Foo Shui Yen; Zhou Qianmin

South Korea
5
PhilSports Arena
20 February 1998

Chinese Taipei
0

		Result
1	Kim Ji-hyun	2 – 0	Chan Ya-lin
2	Lee Joo-hyun	2 – 0	Jeng Shwu-jen
3	Lee Kyung-won	2 – 0	Kuo Ling-yan
4	Chung Jae-hee; Yim Kyung-jin	2 – 0	Chen Li-chin; Tsai Hui-min
5	Jang Hye-ock; Ra Kyung-min	2 – 0	Chen Mei-jun; Chen Wan-ju

Canada
3
PhilSports Arena
20 February 1998

Singapore
2

q

		Result
1	Denyse Julien	0 – 2 (7–11, 1–11)	Zarinah Abdullah
2	Charmaine Reid	2 – 0 (11–1, 11–3)	Foo Shui Yen
3	Julia Chen	0 – 2 (6–11, 4–11)	Zhou Qianmin
4	Milaine Cloutier; Denyse Julien	2 – 0 (15–3, 15–3)	Toh Sock Hui; Zarinah Abdullah
5	Julia Chen; Charmaine Reid	2 – 0 (15–11, 15–4)	Foo Shui Yen; Zhou Qianmin

=== Knockout stage ===
Semi-finals
China	5
Chinese Taipei	0
Japan	1
South Korea	4

Final
China	3
South Korea	2
Third place
Chinese Taipei	1
Japan	4

==== Semi-finals ====
China
5
PhilSports Arena
21 February 1998

Chinese Taipei
0

		Result
1	Gong Zhichao	2 – 0 (11–1, 11–1)	Chen Wan-ju
2	Dai Yun	2 – 0 (11–5, 11–1)	Lin Chiu-yin
3	Zhang Ning	2 – 0 (11–7, 11–0)	Kuo Ling-yan
4	Ge Fei; Gu Jun	2 – 0 (15–4, 15–2)	Tsai Hui-min; Chen Li-chin
5	Qin Yiyuan; Tang Yongshu	2 – 0 (15–2, 15–4)	Chen Mei-jun; Chen Wan-ju

South Korea
4
PhilSports Arena
21 February 1998

Japan
1

		Result
1	Kim Ji-hyun	2 – 0 (11–0, 12–9)	Kanako Yonekura
2	Lee Joo-hyun	2 – 0 (11–7, 11–8)	Yasuko Mizui
3	Lee Kyung-won	1 – 2 (3–11, 11–8, 11–8)	Takako Ida
4	Jang Hye-ock; Ra Kyung-min	2 – 0 (15–12, 15–4)	Yoshiko Iwata; Haruko Matsuda
5	Chung Jae-hee; Kim Kyung-ran	2 – 0 (15–7, 15–8)	Saori Itō; Shizuka Yamamoto

==== Third place ====
Japan
4
PhilSports Arena
21 February 1998

Chinese Taipei
1

		Result
1	Kanako Yonekura	2 – 0 (11–5, 11–1)	Chan Ya-lin
2	Yasuko Mizui	2 – 0 (12–10, 11–3)	Jeng Shwu-jen
3	Takako Ida	2 – 0 (12–10, 11–3)	Kuo Ling-yan
4	Yoshiko Iwata; Haruko Matsuda	1 – 2 (14–18, 15–12, 10–15)	Chen Li-chin; Tsai Hui-min
5	Shizuka Yamamoto; Kanako Yonekura	2 – 0 (18–14, 15–3)	Chen Mei-jun; Chen Wan-ju

==== Final ====
China
3
PhilSports Arena
22 February 1998

South Korea
2

		Result
1	Gong Zhichao	1 – 2 (11–4, 11–12, 8–11)	Kim Ji-hyun
2	Dai Yun	2 – 0 (11–5, 11–2)	Lee Joo-hyun
3	Wang Chen	2 – 0 (11–5, 11–1)	Lee Soon-deuk
4	Ge Fei; Gu Jun	2 – 0 (15–5, 15–4)	Chung Jae-hee; Yim Kyung-jin
5	Qin Yiyuan; Tang Yongshu	1 – 2 (9–15, 15–4, 12–15)	Jang Hye-ock; Ra Kyung-min

== European Zone ==
The European qualifying rounds were held in the Slagenhallen for first round matches and in the Jotunhallen starting from the second round in Sandefjord, Norway.

=== First round ===
==== Group A ====
Pos	Team	Pld	W	L	MF	MA	MD	Pts	Qualification
1	Norway	3	3	0	11	4	+7	3	Advance to second round
2	Belarus	3	2	1	12	3	+9	2	
3	Czech Republic	3	1	2	5	10	−5	1	
4	Belgium	3	0	3	2	13	−11	0	
5	Hungary	0	0	0	0	0	0	0	Withdrew

Source: International Badminton Federation

Belarus
5
Slagenhallen
14 February 1998

Czech Republic
0

		Result
1	Vlada Chernyavskaya	2 – 0	Markéta Koudelková
2	Maria Kizil	2 – 0	Regina Rašková
3	Tatiana Gerassimovitch	2 – 0	Diana Stádníková
4	Vlada Chernyavskaya; Tatiana Gerassimovitch	2 – 0	Markéta Koudelková; Diana Stádníková
5	Maria Kizil; Nadezhda Kostioutchik	2 – 0	Eva Brožová; Regina Rašková

Belgium
0
Slagenhallen
14 February 1998

Norway
5

		Result
1	Mallory Gosset	1 – 2 (8–11, 11–3, 8–11)	Tove Hol
2	Peggy Mampaey	0 – 2 (5–11, 2–11)	Sissel Linderoth
3	Nathalie Descamps	0 – 2 (11–12, 7–11)	Monica Halvorsen
4	Manon Albinus; Mallory Gosset	0 – 2 (1–15, 6–15)	Sissel Linderoth; Camilla Wright
5	Katrien Claes; Peggy Mampaey	1 – 2 (11–15, 15–9, 5–15)	Monica Halvorsen; Tove Hol

Belarus
2
Slagenhallen
15 February 1998

Norway
3

		Result
1	Vlada Chernyavskaya	2 – 0 (11–4, 12–10)	Tove Hol
2	Maria Kizil	0 – 2 (9–12, 1–11)	Sissel Linderoth
3	Tatiana Gerassimovitch	2 – 1 (11–1, 11–12, 11–7)	Monica Halvorsen
4	Vlada Chernyavskaya; Tatiana Gerassimovitch	1 – 2 (15–17, 17–15, 14–17)	Sissel Linderoth; Camilla Wright
5	Maria Kizil; Nadezhda Kostioutchik	0 – 2 (4–15, 15–17)	Monica Halvorsen; Tove Hol

Belgium
3
Slagenhallen
15 February 1998

Czech Republic
2

		Result
1	Mallory Gosset	1 – 2	Markéta Koudelková
2	Peggy Mampaey	2 – 0	Regina Rašková
3	Nathalie Descamps	2 – 0	Diana Stádníková
4	Manon Albinus; Mallory Gosset	1 – 2	Markéta Koudelková; Diana Stádníková
5	Katrien Claes; Peggy Mampaey	2 – 0	Eva Brožová; Regina Rašková

Belarus
5
Slagenhallen
16 February 1998

Belgium
0

		Result
1	Vlada Chernyavskaya	2 – 0	Mallory Gosset
2	Maria Kizil	2 – 1	Peggy Mampaey
3	Tatiana Gerassimovitch	2 – 0	Nathalie Descamps
4	Vlada Chernyavskaya; Tatiana Gerassimovitch	2 – 0	Manon Albinus; Mallory Gosset
5	Maria Kizil; Nadezhda Kostioutchik	2 – 0	Katrien Claes; Peggy Mampaey

Czech Republic
2
Slagenhallen
16 February 1998

Norway
3

		Result
1	Markéta Koudelková	0 – 2 (3–11, 2–11)	Tove Hol
2	Regina Rašková	0 – 2 (1–11, 8–11)	Sissel Linderoth
3	Diana Stádníková	2 – 1 (7–11, 12–9, 11–8)	Monica Halvorsen
4	Markéta Koudelková; Diana Stádníková	0 – 2 (7–15, 8–15)	Sissel Linderoth; Camilla Wright
5	Eva Brožová; Regina Rašková	2 – 1 (14–18, 18–15, 15–9)	Monica Halvorsen; Tove Hol

==== Group B ====
Pos	Team	Pld	W	L	MF	MA	MD	Pts	Qualification
1	Ukraine	3	3	0	14	1	+13	3	Advance to second round
2	Finland	3	2	1	10	5	+5	2	
3	Austria	3	1	2	5	10	−5	1	
4	Latvia	3	0	3	1	14	−13	0	
5	Slovakia	0	0	0	0	0	0	0	Withdrew

Source: International Badminton Federation

Ukraine
5
Slagenhallen
14 February 1998

Latvia
0

		Result
1	Elena Nozdran	2 – 0	Kristīne Šefere
2	Natalia Golovkina	2 – 0	Dace Šneidere
3	Natalia Esipenko	2 – 0	Kristīne Tīruma
4	Victoria Evtoushenko; Elena Nozdran	2 – 0	Margarita Miķelsone; Kristīne Šefere
5	Natalia Esipenko; Natalia Golovkina	2 – 0	Dace Šneidere; Kristīne Tīruma

Finland
5
Slagenhallen
14 February 1998

Austria
0

		Result
1	Anu Weckström	2 – 0 (11–0, 11–1)	Elke Lengauer
2	Malin Virta	2 – 0 (11–8, 11–4)	Tina Riedl
3	Saara Hynninen	2 – 0 (11–5, 11–6)	Sabine Franz
4	Marjaana Moilanen; Malin Virta	2 – 0 (15–5, 15–3)	Sabine Franz; Simone Prutsch
5	Leena Löytömäki; Anu Weckström	2 – 0 (15–6, 15–8)	Elke Lengauer; Tina Riedl

Ukraine
5
Slagenhallen
15 February 1998

Austria
0

		Result
1	Elena Nozdran	2 – 0	Elke Lengauer
2	Natalia Golovkina	2 – 0	Tina Riedl
3	Natalia Esipenko	2 – 0	Sabine Franz
4	Victoria Evtoushenko; Elena Nozdran	2 – 0	Sabine Franz; Simone Prutsch
5	Natalia Esipenko; Natalia Golovkina	2 – 0	Elke Lengauer; Tina Riedl

Finland
5
Slagenhallen
15 February 1998

Latvia
0

		Result
1	Anu Weckström	2 – 0	Kristīne Šefere
2	Malin Virta	2 – 0	Dace Šneidere
3	Saara Hynninen	2 – 0	Kristīne Tīruma
4	Marjaana Moilanen; Malin Virta	2 – 0	Margarita Miķelsone; Kristīne Šefere
5	Leena Löytömäki; Anu Weckström	2 – 0	Dace Šneidere; Kristīne Tīruma

Ukraine
4
Slagenhallen
16 February 1998

Finland
1

		Result
1	Elena Nozdran	2 – 1	Anu Weckström
2	Natalia Golovkina	2 – 0	Malin Virta
3	Natalia Esipenko	1 – 2	Saara Hynninen
4	Victoria Evtoushenko; Elena Nozdran	2 – 0	Marjaana Moilanen; Malin Virta
5	Natalia Esipenko; Natalia Golovkina	2 – 0	Leena Löytömäki; Anu Weckström

Austria
5
Slagenhallen
16 February 1998

Latvia
0

		Result
1	Elke Lengauer	2 – 0	Kristīne Šefere
2	Tina Riedl	2 – 0	Dace Šneidere
3	Sabine Franz	2 – 0	Kristīne Tīruma
4	Sabine Franz; Simone Prutsch	2 – 0	Margarita Miķelsone; Kristīne Šefere
5	Elke Lengauer; Tina Riedl	2 – 0	Dace Šneidere; Kristīne Tīruma

==== Group C ====
Pos	Team	Pld	W	L	MF	MA	MD	Pts	Qualification
1	Wales	3	3	0	15	0	+15	3	Advance to second round
2	Lithuania	3	2	1	7	8	−1	2	
3	Cyprus	3	1	2	7	8	−1	1	
4	Mexico	3	0	3	1	14	−13	0	

Source: International Badminton Federation

Wales
5
Slagenhallen
14 February 1998

Mexico
0

		Result
1	Kelly Morgan	2 – 0	Verónica Estrada
2	Gail Osborne	2 – 0	Ana Laura de la Torre
3	Katie Howell	2 – 0	Gabriella Rodríguez
4	Natasha Groves-Burke; Sarah Williams	2 – 0	Laura Amaya; Verónica Estrada
5	Katie Howell; Gail Osborne	2 – 0	Gabriella Rodríguez; Aurora Salazar

Cyprus
2
Slagenhallen
14 February 1998

Lithuania
3

		Result
1	Diana Knekna	2 – 1	Neringa Karosaitė
2	Elena Iasonos	1 – 2	Aina Kravtienė
3	Evi Kyprianou	1 – 2	Erika Milikauskaitė
4	Elena Iasonos; Diana Knekna	2 – 0	Rasa Mikšytė; Jūratė Prevelienė
5	Evi Kyprianou; Maria Ioannou	1 – 2	Neringa Karosaitė; Aina Kravtienė

Wales
5
Slagenhallen
15 February 1998

Lithuania
0

		Result
1	Kelly Morgan	2 – 0	Neringa Karosaitė
2	Gail Osborne	2 – 0	Aina Kravtienė
3	Katie Howell	2 – 0	Erika Milikauskaitė
4	Natasha Groves-Burke; Sarah Williams	2 – 0	Rasa Mikšytė; Jūratė Prevelienė
5	Katie Howell; Gail Osborne	2 – 0	Neringa Karosaitė; Erika Milikauskaitė

Cyprus
5
Slagenhallen
15 February 1998

Mexico
0

		Result
1	Diana Knekna	2 – 0	Verónica Estrada
2	Elena Iasonos	2 – 1	Ana Laura de la Torre
3	Maria Ioannou	2 – 1	Gabriella Rodríguez
4	Elena Iasonos; Diana Knekna	2 – 0	Laura Amaya; Verónica Estrada
5	Evi Kyprianou; Maria Ioannou	2 – 0	Gabriella Rodríguez; Aurora Salazar

Wales
5
Slagenhallen
16 February 1998

Cyprus
0

		Result
1	Kelly Morgan	2 – 0	Diana Knekna
2	Gail Osborne	2 – 0	Elena Iasonos
3	Katie Howell	2 – 0	Maria Ioannou
4	Natasha Groves-Burke; Sarah Williams	2 – 0	Elena Iasonos; Diana Knekna
5	Katie Howell; Gail Osborne	2 – 0	Evi Kyprianou; Maria Ioannou

Lithuania
4
Slagenhallen
16 February 1998

Mexico
1

		Result
1	Neringa Karosaitė	2 – 1	Verónica Estrada
2	Aina Kravtienė	1 – 2	Ana Laura de la Torre
3	Erika Milikauskaitė	2 – 0	Gabriella Rodríguez
4	Rasa Mikšytė; Jūratė Prevelienė	2 – 0	Laura Amaya; Verónica Estrada
5	Neringa Karosaitė; Aina Kravtienė	2 – 1	Gabriella Rodríguez; Aurora Salazar

==== Group D ====
Pos	Team	Pld	W	L	MF	MA	MD	Pts	Qualification
1	Switzerland	3	3	0	15	0	+15	3	Advance to second round
2	Peru	3	2	1	10	5	+5	2	
3	Armenia	3	1	2	5	10	−5	1	
4	Georgia	3	0	3	1	14	−13	0	

Source: International Badminton Federation

Switzerland
5
Slagenhallen
14 February 1998

Peru
0

		Result
1	Santi Wibowo	2 – 0 (11–4, 11–4)	Lorena Blanco
2	Judith Baumeyer	2 – 1 (8–11, 11–0, 11–0)	Ximena Bellido
3	Silvia Albrecht	2 – 0 (12–10, 11–2)	Sandra Jimeno
4	Judith Baumeyer; Santi Wibowo	2 – 0 (15–2, 15–11)	Sandra Jimeno; Doriana Rivera
5	Silvia Albrecht; Fabienne Baumeyer	2 – 0 (17–14, 15–9)	Ximena Bellido; Lorena Blanco

Georgia
1
Slagenhallen
14 February 1998

Armenia
4

		Result
1	Ia Khartonishvili	1 – 2	Alvard Hovsepyan
2	Gaiane Chakhoian	2 – 1	Ruzanna Hakobyan
3	Khatuna Khelidze	0 – 2	Mariam Muradyan
4	Gaiane Chakhoian; Ia Khartonishvili	0 – 2	Ruzanna Hakobyan; Alvard Hovsepyan
5	Khatuna Khelidze; Irena Kirakosian	0 – 2	Arpine Hayrapetyan; Mariam Muradyan

Switzerland
5
Slagenhallen
15 February 1998

Armenia
0

		Result
1	Santi Wibowo	2 – 0 (11–0, 11–1)	Alvard Hovsepyan
2	Jennifer Bauer	2 – 0 (11–1, 11–1)	Ruzanna Hakobyan
3	Silvia Albrecht	2 – 0 (11–1, 11–2)	Mariam Muradyan
4	Judith Baumeyer; Santi Wibowo	2 – 0 (15–5, 15–1)	Ruzanna Hakobyan; Alvard Hovsepyan
5	Jennifer Bauer; Fabienne Baumeyer	2 – 0 (15–2, 15–3)	Arpine Hayrapetyan; Mariam Muradyan

Georgia
0
Slagenhallen
15 February 1998

Peru
5

		Result
1	Ia Khartonishvili	0 – 2	Lorena Blanco
2	Gaiane Chakhoian	0 – 2	Ximena Bellido
3	Khatuna Khelidze	0 – 2	Sandra Jimeno
4	Gaiane Chakhoian; Ia Khartonishvili	0 – 2	Sandra Jimeno; Doriana Rivera
5	Khatuna Khelidze; Irena Kirakosian	0 – 2	Ximena Bellido; Lorena Blanco

Switzerland
5
Slagenhallen
16 February 1998

Georgia
0

		Result
1	Santi Wibowo	2 – 0 (11–0, 11–0)	Ia Khartonishvili
2	Jennifer Bauer	2 – 0 (11–2, 11–1)	Gaiane Chakhoian
3	Silvia Albrecht	2 – 0 (11–0, 11–0)	Khatuna Khelidze
4	Judith Baumeyer; Santi Wibowo	2 – 0 (15–0, 15–1)	Gaiane Chakhoian; Ia Khartonishvili
5	Jennifer Bauer; Fabienne Baumeyer	2 – 0 (15–1, 15–0)	Khatuna Khelidze; Irena Kirakosian

Peru
5
Slagenhallen
16 February 1998

Armenia
0

		Result
1	Lorena Blanco	2 – 0	Alvard Hovsepyan
2	Ximena Bellido	2 – 0	Ruzanna Hakobyan
3	Sandra Jimeno	2 – 0	Mariam Muradyan
4	Sandra Jimeno; Doriana Rivera	2 – 0	Ruzanna Hakobyan; Alvard Hovsepyan
5	Ximena Bellido; Lorena Blanco	2 – 0	Arpine Hayrapetyan; Mariam Muradyan

==== Group E ====
Pos	Team	Pld	W	L	MF	MA	MD	Pts	Qualification
1	Poland	3	3	0	11	4	+7	3	Advance to second round
2	Iceland	3	2	1	10	5	+5	2	
3	South Africa	3	1	2	6	9	−3	1	
4	Estonia	3	0	3	3	12	−9	0	

Source: International Badminton Federation

Poland
3
Slagenhallen
14 February 1998

South Africa
2

		Result
1	Katarzyna Krasowska	2 – 0	Lina Fourie
2	Joanna Szleszyńska	1 – 2	Michelle Edwards
3	Dorota Grzejdak	1 – 2	Monique Ric-Hansen
4	Dorota Grzejdak; Kinga Rudolf	2 – 1	Lina Fourie; Michelle Edwards
5	Katarzyna Krasowska; Joanna Szleszyńska	2 – 0	Meagen Burnett; Monique Ric-Hansen

Iceland
4
Slagenhallen
14 February 1998

Estonia
1

		Result
1	Elsa Nielsen	2 – 1	Kelli Vilu
2	Vigdís Ásgeirsdóttir	1 – 2	Kairi Saks
3	Brynja Pétursdóttir	2 – 0	Piret Hamer
4	Vigdís Ásgeirsdóttir; Elsa Nielsen	2 – 1	Kati Kraaving; Kelli Vilu
5	Katrín Atladóttir; Birna Petersen	2 – 0	Eve Jugandi; Kelli Vilu

Poland
5
Slagenhallen
15 February 1998

Estonia
0

		Result
1	Katarzyna Krasowska	2 – 0	Kelli Vilu
2	Kinga Rudolf	2 – 1	Kairi Saks
3	Joanna Szleszyńska	2 – 1	Piret Hamer
4	Dorota Grzejdak; Kinga Rudolf	2 – 0	Kati Kraaving; Kelli Vilu
5	Katarzyna Krasowska; Joanna Szleszyńska	2 – 0	Eve Jugandi; Kelli Vilu

Iceland
4
Slagenhallen
15 February 1998

South Africa
1

		Result
1	Vigdís Ásgeirsdóttir	2 – 1	Lina Fourie
2	Elsa Nielsen	2 – 1	Michelle Edwards
3	Brynja Pétursdóttir	2 – 1	Monique Ric-Hansen
4	Vigdís Ásgeirsdóttir; Elsa Nielsen	0 – 2	Lina Fourie; Tracey Thompson
5	Katrín Atladóttir; Birna Petersen	2 – 1	Meagen Burnett; Michelle Edwards

Poland
3
Slagenhallen
16 February 1998

Iceland
2

		Result
1	Katarzyna Krasowska	2 – 0 (12–10, 11–2)	Vigdís Ásgeirsdóttir
2	Kinga Rudolf	2 – 1 (11–6, 10–12, 12–11)	Elsa Nielsen
3	Joanna Szleszyńska	2 – 1 (1–11, 11–7, 11–4)	Brynja Pétursdóttir
4	Dorota Grzejdak; Kinga Rudolf	1 – 2 (15–13, 2–15, 6–15)	Vigdís Ásgeirsdóttir; Elsa Nielsen
5	Katarzyna Krasowska; Joanna Szleszyńska	0 – 2 (5–15, 5–15)	Brynja Pétursdóttir; Drífa Harðardóttir

South Africa
3
Slagenhallen
16 February 1998

Estonia
2

		Result
1	Lina Fourie	2 – 0	Kelli Vilu
2	Michelle Edwards	1 – 2	Kairi Saks
3	Monique Ric-Hansen	2 – 0	Piret Hamer
4	Lina Fourie; Tracey Thompson	2 – 0	Eve Jugandi; Kairi Saks
5	Meagen Burnett; Michelle Edwards	1 – 2	Kati Kraaving; Kelli Vilu

==== Group F ====
Pos	Team	Pld	W	L	MF	MA	MD	Pts	Qualification
1	Ireland	3	3	0	15	0	+15	3	Advance to second round
2	Portugal	3	2	1	8	7	+1	2	
3	Spain	3	1	2	7	8	−1	1	
4	Azerbaijan	3	0	3	0	15	−15	0	

Source: International Badminton Federation

Ireland
5
Slagenhallen
14 February 1998

Azerbaijan
0

		Result
1	Sonya McGinn	2 – 0 (11–1, 11–0)	Sabina Akhundova
2	Elaine Kiely	2 – 0 (11–5, 11–1)	Nargiz Mehdieva
3	Claire Henderson	2 – 0 (11–2, 11–1)	Natavan Aliyeva
4	Elaine Kiely; Sonya McGinn	2 – 0 (15–3, 15–1)	Natavan Aliyeva; Nargiz Mehdieva
5	Claire Henderson; Jayne Plunkett	2 – 0 (15–1, 15–0)	Sabina Akhundova; Alla Vlasyuk

Portugal
3
Slagenhallen
14 February 1998

Spain
2

		Result
1	Filipa Lamy	1 – 2	Dolores Marco
2	Ana Ferreira	1 – 2	Ana Ferrer
3	Helena Berimbau	2 – 0	Yoana Martínez
4	Ana Ferreira; Filipa Lamy	2 – 0	Dolores Marco; Lucía Tavera
5	Helena Berimbau; Sonia Lopes	2 – 1	Mercedes Cuenca; Yoana Martínez

Ireland
5
Slagenhallen
15 February 1998

Spain
0

		Result
1	Sonya McGinn	2 – 0 (11–1, 11–8)	Dolores Marco
2	Elaine Kiely	2 – 0 (11–7, 12–9)	Ana Ferrer
3	Claire Henderson	2 – 0 (12–11, 11–1)	Yoana Martínez
4	Elaine Kiely; Sonya McGinn	2 – 0 (15–7, 15–4)	Dolores Marco; Lucía Tavera
5	Claire Henderson; Jayne Plunkett	2 – 0 (15–3, 15–4)	Mercedes Cuenca; Yoana Martínez

Portugal
5
Slagenhallen
15 February 1998

Azerbaijan
0

		Result
1	Filipa Lamy	2 – 0	Sabina Akhundova
2	Ana Ferreira	2 – 0	Nargiz Mehdieva
3	Helena Berimbau	2 – 0	Natavan Aliyeva
4	Ana Ferreira; Filipa Lamy	2 – 0	Natavan Aliyeva; Nargiz Mehdieva
5	Helena Berimbau; Sonia Lopes	2 – 0	Sabina Akhundova; Alla Vlasyuk

Ireland
5
Slagenhallen
16 February 1998

Portugal
0

		Result
1	Sonya McGinn	2 – 0 (11–4, 11–0)	Filipa Lamy
2	Elaine Kiely	2 – 0 (11–6, 11–7)	Ana Ferreira
3	Claire Henderson	2 – 1 (7–11, 11–7, 11–7)	Helena Berimbau
4	Elaine Kiely; Sonya McGinn	2 – 0 (15–6, 18–16)	Ana Ferreira; Filipa Lamy
5	Claire Henderson; Jayne Plunkett	2 – 0 (15–4, 15–4)	Helena Berimbau; Sonia Lopes

Spain
5
Slagenhallen
16 February 1998

Azerbaijan
0

		Result
1	Dolores Marco	2 – 0	Sabina Akhundova
2	Ana Ferrer	2 – 0	Nargiz Mehdieva
3	Yoana Martínez	2 – 0	Natavan Aliyeva
4	Dolores Marco; Lucía Tavera	2 – 0	Natavan Aliyeva; Nargiz Mehdieva
5	Mercedes Cuenca; Yoana Martínez	2 – 0	Sabina Akhundova; Alla Vlasyuk

==== Group G ====
Pos	Team	Pld	W	L	MF	MA	MD	Pts	Qualification
1	United States	3	3	0	10	5	+5	3	Advance to second round
2	Italy	3	2	1	8	7	+1	2	
3	Kazakhstan	3	1	2	7	8	−1	1	
4	Slovenia	3	0	3	5	10	−5	0	

Source: International Badminton Federation

Kazakhstan
2
Slagenhallen
14 February 1998

United States
3

		Result
1	Irina Gritsenko	2 – 0 (11–6, 11–5)	Kathy Zimmerman
2	Saule Kustavletova	2 – 0 (11–4, 11–7)	Becky Wu
3	Olga Gafarova	0 – 2 (2–11, 2–11)	Yeping Tang
4	Olga Gafarova; Irina Gritsenko	1 – 2 (8–15, 15–8, 14–17)	Eileen Tang; Becky Wu
5	Saule Kustavletova; Ludmila Okuneva	1 – 2 (15–12, 5–15, 11–15)	Yeping Tang; Kathy Zimmerman

Slovenia
2
Slagenhallen
14 February 1998

Italy
3

		Result
1	Maja Pohar	2 – 0	Monica Memoli
2	Mateja Slatnar	1 – 2	Maria Luisa Mur
3	Darja Kranjc	1 – 2	Petra Schrott
4	Darja Kranjc; Mateja Slatnar	1 – 2	Monica Memoli; Maria Luisa Mur
5	Tinka Pelhan; Maja Pohar	2 – 1	Maria Grazia Italiano; Petra Schrott

Kazakhstan
2
Slagenhallen
15 February 1998

Italy
3

		Result
1	Irina Gritsenko	2 – 0	Monica Memoli
2	Saule Kustavletova	1 – 2	Maria Luisa Mur
3	Olga Gafarova	0 – 2	Petra Schrott
4	Irina Gritsenko; Olga Gafarova	1 – 2	Monica Memoli; Maria Luisa Mur
5	Ludmila Okuneva; Saule Kustavletova	2 – 0	Maria Grazia Italiano; Petra Schrott

Slovenia
1
Slagenhallen
15 February 1998

United States
4

		Result
1	Maja Pohar	2 – 0 (11–3, 11–8)	Kathy Zimmerman
2	Mateja Slatnar	0 – 2 (3–11, 5–11)	Becky Wu
3	Darja Kranjc	0 – 2 (2–11, 3–11)	Yeping Tang
4	Darja Kranjc; Mateja Slatnar	0 – 2 (9–15, 8–15)	Eileen Tang; Becky Wu
5	Tinka Pelhan; Maja Pohar	0 – 2 (5–15, 7–15)	Yeping Tang; Kathy Zimmerman

Kazakhstan
3
Slagenhallen
16 February 1998

Slovenia
2

		Result
1	Irina Gritsenko	1 – 2	Maja Pohar
2	Saule Kustavletova	2 – 0	Mateja Slatnar
3	Olga Gafarova	1 – 2	Darja Kranjc
4	Irina Gritsenko; Olga Gafarova	2 – 0	Darja Kranjc; Mateja Slatnar
5	Ludmila Okuneva; Saule Kustavletova	2 – 1	Tinka Pelhan; Maja Pohar

United States
3
Slagenhallen
16 February 1998

Italy
2

		Result
1	Kathy Zimmerman	2 – 1	Monica Memoli
2	Becky Wu	0 – 2	Maria Luisa Mur
3	Yeping Tang	0 – 0^{r}	Maria Grazia Italiano
4	Eileen Tang; Becky Wu	1 – 2	Monica Memoli; Maria Luisa Mur
5	Yeping Tang; Kathy Zimmerman	2 – 1	Maria Grazia Italiano; Petra Schrott

=== Second round ===
==== Group W ====
Pos	Team	Pld	W	L	MF	MA	MD	Pts	Qualification
1	Denmark	3	3	0	15	0	+15	3	Advance to knockout stage
2	Bulgaria	3	2	1	6	9	−3	2	
3	France	3	1	2	5	10	−5	1	
4	Norway	3	0	3	4	11	−7	0	

Source: International Badminton Federation

Denmark
5
Jotunhallen
17 February 1998

France
0

		Result
1	Mette Pedersen	2 – 0 (11–4, 11–2)	Sandra Dimbour
2	Mette Sørensen	2 – 0 (11–0, 11–1)	Tatiana Vattier
3	Christina Sørensen	2 – 0 (11–5, 11–4)	Lilas Lefort
4	Rikke Olsen; Marlene Thomsen	2 – 0 (15–5, 15–8)	Sandra Dimbour; Sandrine Lefèvre
5	Helene Kirkegaard; Pernille Harder	2 – 0 (15–5, 15–5)	Christelle Vallet; Tatiana Vattier

Bulgaria
3
Jotunhallen
17 February 1998

Norway
2

		Result
1	Dobrinka Smilianova	1 – 2 (6–11, 11–8, 8–11)	Tove Hol
2	Victoria Hristova	2 – 1 (6–11, 11–4, 11–8)	Sissel Linderoth
3	Neli Nedyalkova	2 – 0 (11–4, 11–0)	Anita Elson
4	Dimitriyka Dimitrova; Dobrinka Smilianova	1 – 2 (15–11, 8–15, 5–15)	Sissel Linderoth; Camilla Wright
5	Diana Koleva; Neli Nedyalkova	2 – 0 (15–5, 15–1)	Monica Halvorsen; Tove Hol

Denmark
5
Jotunhallen
18 February 1998

Norway
0

		Result
1	Mette Pedersen	2 – 0 (11–4, 11–3)	Tove Hol
2	Mette Sørensen	2 – 0 (11–2, 11–0)	Sissel Linderoth
3	Christina Sørensen	2 – 0 (11–1, 11–0)	Anita Elson
4	Rikke Olsen; Marlene Thomsen	2 – 0 (15–4, 15–2)	Sissel Linderoth; Camilla Wright
5	Helene Kirkegaard; Pernille Harder	2 – 0 (15–3, 15–1)	Helene Abusdal; Anita Elson

Bulgaria
3
Jotunhallen
18 February 1998

France
2

		Result
1	Dobrinka Smilianova	1 – 2	Sandra Dimbour
2	Victoria Hristova	2 – 0	Tatiana Vattier
3	Neli Nedyalkova	2 – 0	Lilas Lefort
4	Dimitriyka Dimitrova; Dobrinka Smilianova	1 – 2	Sandra Dimbour; Sandrine Lefèvre
5	Diana Koleva; Neli Nedyalkova	2 – 0	Christelle Vallet; Tatiana Vattier

Denmark
5
Jotunhallen
19 February 1998

Bulgaria
0

		Result
1	Camilla Martin	2 – 0 (11–0, 11–2)	Dobrinka Smilianova
2	Mette Sørensen	2 – 0 (11–5, 11–3)	Victoria Hristova
3	Christina Sørensen	2 – 0 (11–3, 11–6)	Dimitriyka Dimitrova
4	Rikke Olsen; Marlene Thomsen	2 – 0 (15–1, 15–5)	Diana Koleva; Neli Nedyalkova
5	Ann Jørgensen; Majken Vange	2 – 0 (15–7, 15–3)	Dimitriyka Dimitrova; Dobrinka Smilianova

France
3
Jotunhallen
19 February 1998

Norway
2

		Result
1	Sandra Dimbour	2 – 1 (7–11, 11–2, 12–10)	Tove Hol
2	Sandrine Lefèvre	1 – 2 (11–3, 4–11, 1–11)	Sissel Linderoth
3	Lilas Lefort	2 – 0 (12–9, 12–11)	Anita Elson
4	Sandra Dimbour; Sandrine Lefèvre	1 – 2 (15–7, 6–15, 7–15)	Sissel Linderoth; Camilla Wright
5	Christelle Vallet; Tatiana Vattier	2 – 1 (12–15, 15–5, 15–5)	Helene Abusdal; Tove Hol

==== Group X ====
Pos	Team	Pld	W	L	MF	MA	MD	Pts	Qualification
1	Netherlands	3	3	0	13	2	+11	3	Advance to knockout stage
2	Ukraine	3	2	1	7	8	−1	2	
3	Russia	3	1	2	10	5	+5	1	
4	Switzerland	3	0	3	1	14	−13	0	

Source: International Badminton Federation

Russia
5
Jotunhallen
17 February 1998

Switzerland
0

		Result
1	Ella Karachkova	2 – 1 (10–12, 11–5, 11–3)	Santi Wibowo
2	Elena Sukhareva	2 – 0 (11–5, 11–3)	Judith Baumeyer
3	Natalia Gorodnicheva	2 – 0 (11–1, 11–2)	Jennifer Bauer
4	Nadezhda Chervyakova; Ella Karachkova	2 – 0 (15–12, 15–4)	Judith Baumeyer; Santi Wibowo
5	Svetlana Alferova; Irina Yakusheva	2 – 1 (12–15, 15–7, 15–7)	Silvia Albrecht; Fabienne Baumeyer

Netherlands
4
Jotunhallen
17 February 1998

Ukraine
1

		Result
1	Judith Meulendijks	2 – 0 (12–10, 11–1)	Elena Nozdran
2	Brenda Beenhakker	2 – 0 (11–5, 11–4)	Natalia Golovkina
3	Lonneke Janssen	2 – 0 (11–5, 11–3)	Natalia Esipenko
4	Monique Hoogland; Erica van den Heuvel	2 – 0 (15–11, 15–7)	Victoria Evtoushenko; Elena Nozdran
5	Lotte Jonathans; Nicole van Hooren	2 – 0 (15–4, 15–4)	Natalia Esipenko; Natalia Golovkina

Russia
2
Jotunhallen
18 February 1998

Ukraine
3

		Result
1	Ella Karachkova	1 – 2	Elena Nozdran
2	Elena Sukhareva	2 – 1	Natalia Golovkina
3	Natalia Gorodnicheva	1 – 2	Natalia Esipenko
4	Nadezhda Chervyakova; Ella Karachkova	0 – 2	Victoria Evtoushenko; Elena Nozdran
5	Svetlana Alferova; Irina Yakusheva	2 – 0	Natalia Esipenko; Natalia Golovkina

Netherlands
4
Jotunhallen
18 February 1998

Switzerland
1

		Result
1	Judith Meulendijks	2 – 1 (4–11, 11–3, 11–0)	Santi Wibowo
2	Brenda Beenhakker	2 – 0 (11–1, 11–1)	Judith Baumeyer
3	Lonneke Janssen	2 – 0 (11–0, 11–0)	Jennifer Bauer
4	Monique Hoogland; Erica van den Heuvel	2 – 0 (15–6, 15–5)	Judith Baumeyer; Santi Wibowo
5	Lotte Jonathans; Nicole van Hooren	2 – 0 (15–2, 15–2)	Silvia Albrecht; Fabienne Baumeyer

Russia
2
Jotunhallen
19 February 1998

Netherlands
3

		Result
1	Ella Karachkova	2 – 0 (11–9, 11–6)	Judith Meulendijks
2	Elena Sukhareva	1 – 2 (6–11, 11–7, 10–12)	Brenda Beenhakker
3	Irina Yakusheva	2 – 0 (11–6, 11–5)	Lonneke Janssen
4	Ella Karachkova; Elena Sukhareva	1 – 2 (15–9, 2–15, 5–15)	Monique Hoogland; Erica van den Heuvel
5	Svetlana Alferova; Irina Yakusheva	0 – 2 (8–15, 15–17)	Lotte Jonathans; Nicole van Hooren

Ukraine
4
Jotunhallen
19 February 1998

Switzerland
1

		Result
1	Elena Nozdran	2 – 0 (11–4, 11–7)	Santi Wibowo
2	Natalia Golovkina	2 – 0 (11–2, 11–6)	Judith Baumeyer
3	Natalia Esipenko	2 – 1 (11–7, 8–11, 11–4)	Silvia Albrecht
4	Victoria Evtoushenko; Elena Nozdran	2 – 0 (15–8, 15–4)	Fabienne Baumeyer; Judith Baumeyer
5	Natalia Esipenko; Natalia Golovkina	0 – 2 (6–15, 7–15)	Silvia Albrecht; Santi Wibowo

==== Group Y ====
Pos	Team	Pld	W	L	MF	MA	MD	Pts	Qualification
1	England	3	3	0	14	1	+13	3	Advance to knockout stage
2	Scotland	3	2	1	8	7	+1	2	
3	Poland	3	1	2	4	11	−7	1	
4	Wales	3	0	3	4	11	−7	0	

Source: International Badminton Federation

England
4
Jotunhallen
17 February 1998

Wales
1

		Result
1	Julia Mann	0 – 2	Kelly Morgan
2	Rebecca Pantaney	2 – 0	Gail Osborne
3	Tracey Hallam	2 – 0	Katie Howell
4	Ella Miles; Sara Sankey	2 – 0	Natasha Groves-Burke; Sarah Williams
5	Joanne Goode; Donna Kellogg	1 – 2	Katie Howell; Gail Osborne

Scotland
4
Jotunhallen
17 February 1998

Poland
1

		Result
1	Anne Gibson	2 – 0 (11–5, 11–9)	Katarzyna Krasowska
2	Gillian Martin	2 – 1 (11–3, 5–11, 12–11)	Kinga Rudolf
3	Fiona Sneddon	0 – 2 (9–12, 10–12)	Joanna Szleszyńska
4	Elinor Middlemiss; Sandra Watt	0 – 2 (15–8, 15–3)	Dorota Grzejdak; Kinga Rudolf
5	Kirsteen McEwan; Pam Whiteford	2 – 0 (15–11, 15–8)	Katarzyna Krasowska; Joanna Szleszyńska

England
5
Jotunhallen
18 February 1998

Poland
0

		Result
1	Julia Mann	2 – 1 (7–11, 11–8, 11–4)	Katarzyna Krasowska
2	Rebecca Pantaney	2 – 0 (11–2, 11–4)	Kinga Rudolf
3	Tracey Hallam	2 – 0 (12–10, 11–8)	Joanna Szleszyńska
4	Ella Miles; Sara Sankey	2 – 1 (14–18, 15–7, 15–7)	Dorota Grzejdak; Kinga Rudolf
5	Joanne Goode; Donna Kellogg	2 – 0 (15–2, 15–5)	Katarzyna Krasowska; Joanna Szleszyńska

Scotland
4
Jotunhallen
18 February 1998

Wales
1

		Result
1	Anne Gibson	1 – 2 (4–11, 11–8, 7–11)	Kelly Morgan
2	Gillian Martin	2 – 0 (11–7, 11–2)	Gail Osborne
3	Fiona Sneddon	2 – 1 (9–12, 12–9, 11–4)	Katie Howell
4	Elinor Middlemiss; Sandra Watt	2 – 0 (15–1, 15–7)	Natasha Groves-Burke; Katie Howell
5	Kirsteen McEwan; Pam Whiteford	2 – 0 (17–15, 15–7)	Kelly Morgan; Gail Osborne

England
5
Jotunhallen
19 February 1998

Scotland
0

		Result
1	Julia Mann	2 – 0 (11–8, 11–1)	Anne Gibson
2	Rebecca Pantaney	2 – 1 (10–12, 11–9, 11–7)	Sandra Watt
3	Tracey Hallam	2 – 1 (2–11, 11–9, 11–3)	Gillian Martin
4	Nichola Beck; Joanne Davies	2 – 0 (15–12, 15–11)	Elinor Middlemiss; Sandra Watt
5	Joanne Goode; Donna Kellogg	2 – 0 (15–1, 15–5)	Kirsteen McEwan; Pam Whiteford

Wales
2
Jotunhallen
19 February 1998

Poland
3

		Result
1	Kelly Morgan	2 – 0	Katarzyna Krasowska
2	Gail Osborne	0 – 2	Kinga Rudolf
3	Katie Howell	0 – 2	Joanna Szleszyńska
4	Natasha Groves-Burke; Kelly Morgan	2 – 1	Katarzyna Krasowska; Kinga Rudolf
5	Katie Howell; Gail Osborne	0 – 2	Dorota Grzejdak; Joanna Szleszyńska

==== Group Z ====
Pos	Team	Pld	W	L	MF	MA	MD	Pts	Qualification
1	Sweden	3	3	0	13	2	+11	3	Advance to knockout stage
2	Germany	3	2	1	11	4	+7	2	
3	Ireland	3	1	2	3	12	−9	1	
4	United States	3	0	3	3	12	−9	0	

Source: International Badminton Federation

Sweden
5
Jotunhallen
17 February 1998

Ireland
0

		Result
1	Marina Andrievskaya	2 – 0 (12–9, 11–4)	Sonya McGinn
2	Margit Borg	2 – 0 (11–1, 11–1)	Elaine Kiely
3	Karolina Ericsson	2 – 0 (11–1, 11–2)	Claire Henderson
4	Marina Andrievskaya; Catrine Bengtsson	2 – 0 (15–3, 15–7)	Elaine Kiely; Sonya McGinn
5	Margit Borg; Kristin Evernäs	2 – 0 (15–2, 15–1)	Claire Henderson; Jayne Plunkett

Germany
4
Jotunhallen
17 February 1998

United States
1

		Result
1	Katja Michalowsky	2 – 0	Kathy Zimmerman
2	Nicole Grether	2 – 0	Becky Wu
3	Stefanie Müller	1 – 2	Yeping Tang
4	Karen Stechmann; Kerstin Ubben	2 – 0	Eileen Tang; Becky Wu
5	Nicol Pitro; Anika Sietz	2 – 0	Yeping Tang; Kathy Zimmerman

Sweden
5
Jotunhallen
18 February 1998

United States
0

		Result
1	Marina Andrievskaya	2 – 0 (11–2, 11–2)	Kathy Zimmerman
2	Margit Borg	2 – 0 (11–2, 11–0)	Yeping Tang
3	Karolina Ericsson	2 – 0 (11–0, 11–0)	Eileen Tang
4	Marina Andrievskaya; Catrine Bengtsson	2 – 0 (15–7, 15–4)	Eileen Tang; Yeping Tang
5	Margit Borg; Kristin Evernäs	2 – 0 (15–8, 15–2)	Linda French; Kathy Zimmerman

Germany
5
Jotunhallen
18 February 1998

Ireland
0

		Result
1	Katja Michalowsky	2 – 0 (11–1, 11–2)	Sonya McGinn
2	Nicole Grether	2 – 0 (11–3, 11–4)	Elaine Kiely
3	Stefanie Müller	2 – 0 (11–3, 11–1)	Claire Henderson
4	Karen Stechmann; Kerstin Ubben	2 – 0 (15–10, 15–7)	Elaine Kiely; Sonya McGinn
5	Nicol Pitro; Anika Sietz	2 – 0 (15–5, 15–7)	Claire Henderson; Jayne Plunkett

Sweden
3
Jotunhallen
19 February 1998

Germany
2

		Result
1	Marina Andrievskaya	2 – 0 (11–6, 11–3)	Katja Michalowsky
2	Margit Borg	2 – 0 (11–3, 11–3)	Nicole Grether
3	Karolina Ericsson	1 – 2 (7–11, 11–6, 9–12)	Stefanie Müller
4	Marina Andrievskaya; Catrine Bengtsson	2 – 1 (18–14, 15–18, 15–10)	Elaine Kiely; Sonya McGinn
5	Margit Borg; Kristin Evernäs	0 – 2 (1–15, 3–15)	Claire Henderson; Jayne Plunkett

Ireland
3
Jotunhallen
19 February 1998

United States
2

		Result
1	Sonya McGinn	2 – 0 (11–5, 11–1)	Kathy Zimmerman
2	Elaine Kiely	0 – 2 (3–11, 1–11)	Yeping Tang
3	Claire Henderson	2 – 0 (11–3, 11–2)	Eileen Tang
4	Elaine Kiely; Sonya McGinn	0 – 2 (7–15, 14–18)	Eileen Tang; Yeping Tang
5	Claire Henderson; Jayne Plunkett	2 – 0 (15–12, 15–12)	Linda French; Kathy Zimmerman

=== Knockout stage ===
Semi-finals
Denmark	5
Netherlands	0
England	3
Sweden	2

Final
Denmark	5
England	0
Third place
Netherlands	3
Sweden	2

==== Semi-finals ====
Denmark
5
Jotunhallen
20 February 1998

Netherlands
0

		Result
1	Camilla Martin	2 – 1 (11–1, 8–11, 11–3)	Judith Meulendijks
2	Mette Pedersen	2 – 0 (11–5, 11–6)	Brenda Beenhakker
3	Mette Sørensen	2 – 0 (11–0, 12–10)	Lonneke Janssen
4	Ann Jørgensen; Majken Vange	2 – 0 (17–14, 15–8)	Monique Hoogland; Erica van den Heuvel
5	Rikke Olsen; Marlene Thomsen	2 – 0 (15–10, 15–12)	Lotte Jonathans; Nicole van Hooren

England
3
Jotunhallen
20 February 1998

Sweden
2

		Result
1	Donna Kellogg	1 – 0 (11–5, 6–2^{r})	Marina Andrievskaya
2	Julia Mann	1 – 2 (11–6, 5–11, 5–11)	Margit Borg
3	Tracey Hallam	0 – 2 (8–11, 8–11)	Karolina Ericsson
4	Nichola Beck; Joanne Davies	2 – 0 (15–3, 15–10)	Catrine Bengtsson; Jenny Karlsson
5	Joanne Goode; Donna Kellogg	2 – 0 (15–10, 15–12)	Margit Borg; Kristin Evernäs

==== Third place ====
Sweden
2
Jotunhallen
21 February 1998

Netherlands
3

		Result
1	Margit Borg	0 – 2 (2–11, 7–11)	Judith Meulendijks
2	Karolina Ericsson	2 – 1 (9–12, 11–5, 12–10)	Brenda Beenhakker
3	Catrine Bengtsson	2 – 1 (8–11, 11–3, 11–4)	Lonneke Janssen
4	Johanna Holgersson; Jenny Karlsson	1 – 2 (6–15, 15–8, 12–15)	Monique Hoogland; Erica van den Heuvel
5	Catrine Bengtsson; Kristin Evernäs	0 – 2 (10–15, 12–15)	Lotte Jonathans; Nicole van Hooren

==== Final ====
Denmark
5
Jotunhallen
21 February 1998

Netherlands
0

		Result
1	Camilla Martin	2 – 0 (11–2, 11–7)	Julia Mann
2	Mette Pedersen	2 – 0 (11–7, 12–10)	Rebecca Pantaney
3	Mette Sørensen	2 – 0 (11–1, 12–10)	Sarah Hardaker
4	Ann Jørgensen; Majken Vange	2 – 1 (12–15, 15–9, 15–2)	Nichola Beck; Joanne Davies
5	Rikke Olsen; Marlene Thomsen	2 – 0 (15–5, 15–7)	Joanne Goode; Donna Kellogg
