= Miyamura =

Miyamura (written: 宮村) is a Japanese surname. Notable people with the surname include:

- Aiko Miyamura (宮村 愛子; born 1971), Japanese badminton player
- Akiko Miyamura (宮村 亜貴子; born 1974), Japanese badminton player
- Hideaki Miyamura (born 1955), Japanese-born American potter
- Hiroshi H. Miyamura (1925–2022), American United States Army soldier
- Yūko Miyamura (宮村 優子; born 1972), Japanese voice actress, actress, singer and sound director

== See also ==
- Miyamura Station, a railway station in Miyazu, Kyoto Prefecture, Japan
- Miyamura High School, a high school in Gallup, New Mexico, United States
