= Cypriot National Badminton Championships =

Cypriot National Badminton Championships are held in Cyprus since 1990. The international championships already started 1987.

== Winners ==
Year	Men's singles	Women's singles	Men's doubles	Women's doubles	Mixed doubles
1990	Nicolas Pissis	Maria Iasonos	Athos Shakallis; Panayiottis Poupas	Stella Lazarou; Matilda Kazantzian	Athos Shakallis; Elena Iasonos
1991	Nicolas Pissis	Elena Iasonos	Athos Shakallis; Tassos Zevlaris	Elena Iasonos; Maria Iasonos	Athos Shakallis; Elena Iasonos
1992	Nicolas Pissis	Elena Iasonos	Nicolas Pissis; Tassos Zevlaris	Elena Iasonos; Maria Iasonos	Athos Shakallis; Elena Iasonos
1993	Nicolas Pissis	Diana Knekna	Evandros Votsis; Antonis Lazarov	Diana Knekna; Demetra Ioannou	Nicolas Pissis; Elena Zevlari
1994	Nicolas Pissis	Diana Knekna	Nicolas Pissis; Tassos Zevlaris	Diana Knekna; Demetra Ioannou	Nicolas Pissis; Diana Knekna
1995	Nicolas Pissis	Christina Christofia	Nicolas Pissis; Tassos Zevlaris	Christina Christofia; Diana Drakou	Nicolas Pissis; Christina Christofia
1996	Nicolas Pissis	Diana Knekna	Savvinos Iasonos; Evandros Votsis	Diana Knekna; Demetra Ioannou	Evandros Votsis; Diana Knekna
1997	Nicolas Pissis	Elena Iasonos	Nicolas Pissis; Tassos Zevlaris	Diana Drakou; Evi Kyprianou	Nicolas Pissis; Evi Kyprianou
1998	Nicolas Pissis	Diana Knekna	Nicolas Pissis; Tasos Zevlaris	Diana Knekna; Evi Kyprianou	Evandros Votsis; Diana Knekna
1999	Nicolas Pissis	Diana Knekna	Nicolas Pissis; Panayiotis Poupas	Diana Knekna; Maria Ioannou	Nicolas Pissis; Evi Kyprianou
2000	Nicolas Pissis	Maria Ioannou	Antonis Lazarou; Marios Evangelou	Diana Knekna; Maria Ioannou	Nicolas Pissis; Diana Knekna
2001	Demetris Kyprianou	Maria Ioannou	Constantinos Constantinou; Andreas Constantinou	Diana Knekna; Maria Ioannou	Antonis C. Lazarou; Maria Ioanou
2002	Demetris Kyprianou	Diana Knekna	Demetris Kyprianou; Constantinos Constantinou	Diana Knekna; Maria Ioannou	Nicolas Pissis; Diana Knekna
2003	Demetris Kyprianou	Maria Ioannou	Demetris Kyprianou; Charis Charalambous	Diana Knekna; Maria Ioannou	Charis Charalambous; Maria Ioannou
2004	Demetris Kyprianou	Elena Iacovou	Demetris Kyprianou; Constantinos Constantinou	Maria Ioannou; Dometia Ioannou	Constantinos Constantinou; Dometia Ioannou
2005	Demetris Kyprianou	Dometia Ioannou	Demetris Kyprianou; Nicolas Panayiotou	Maria Ioannou; Dometia Ioannou	Demetris Kyprianou; Marina Demosthenous
2006	Demetris Kyprianou	Dometia Ioannou	Demetris Kyprianou; Nicolas Panayiotou	Maria Ioannou; Dometia Ioannou	Demetris Kyprianou; Maria Ioannou
2007	Demetris Kyprianou	No competition	Demetris Kyprianou; Nicolas Panayiotou	No competition	Demetris Kyprianou; Maria Ioannou
2008	Demetris Kyprianou	No competition	Charis Charalambous; Antonis Lazarou	No competition	Vasilis Vasou; Dometia Ioannou
2009	Vasilis Vasou	Stella Knekna	Charis Charalambous; Antonis Lazarou	Maria Ioannou; Stella Knekna	Vasilis Vasou; Maria Ioannou
2010	Charis Charalambous	Dometia Ioannou	Charis Charalambous; Antonis Lazarou	Dometia Ioannou; Stella Knekna	Charis Charalambous; Stella Knekna
2011	Charis Charalambous	Stella Knekna	Charis Charalambous; Antonis C. Lazarou	Maria Avraamidou; Stella Knekna	Charis Charalambous; Stella Knekna
2012	Charis Charalambous	Dometia Ioannou	Charis Charalambous; Demetris Kyprianou	No competition	Charis Charalambous; Stella Knekna
2013	George Nicolaou	Stella Knekna	George Nicolaou; Elias Nicolaou	Stephanie Pinhary; Stella Knekna	Charis Charalambous; Stella Knekna
2014	Charis Charalambous	Stephanie Pinhary	Charis Charalambous; Andreas Frangou	Stephanie Pinhary; Andrea Chrysostomou	Charis Charalambous; Andrea Chrysostomou
2015	George Nicolaou	Eleni Christodoulou	George Nicolaou; Elias Nicolaou	Stephanie Pinhary; Eleni Christodoulou	George Nicolaou; Eleni Christodoulou
2016	Elias Nicolaou	Eleni Christodoulou	Antonis C. Lazarou; Elias Nicolaou	Anastasia Zintsidou; Eleni Christodoulou	Elias Nicolaou; Eleni Christodoulou
2017	George Nicolaou	Eleni Christodoulou	George Nicolaou; Elias Nicolaou	Anastasia Zintsidou; Eleni Christodoulou	Elias Nicolaou; Eleni Christodoulou
2018	Orestis Pissis	Eleni Christodoulou	Andreas Fragkou; Constantinos Hadjigeorgiou	Anastasia Zintsidou; Eleni Christodoulou	Christakis Temereas; Anastasia Zintsidou
2019	Elias Nicolaou	Eleni Christodoulou	Orestis Pissis; Antonis Adamou	Maria Avraamidou; Eleni Christodoulou	Andreas Ioannou; Eleni Christodoulou
2020	Orestis Pissis	Eleni Christodoulou	George Nicolaou; Elias Nicolaou	Maria Avraamidou; Eleni Christodoulou	Iakovos Acheriotis; Eva Kattirtzi
2021	Christos Hailis	Elena Christodoulou	Kyriakos Pissis; Orestis Pissis	Elena Christodoulou; Eva Kattirtzi	Elias Nicolaou; Eva Kattirtzi
2022	Iacovos Acheriotis	Elena Christodoulou	Kyriakos Pissis; Orestis Pissis	Chara Michael; Ioanna Pissi	Andreas Ioannou; Elena Christodoulou
2023	Elias Nicolaou	Chara Michael	Konstantinos Giannopoulos; Ioannis Tambourlas	Chara Michael; Ioanna Pissi	Ioannis Tambourlas; Ioanna Pissi
2024	Nikolaos Kokosis	Ioanna Pissi	Konstantinos Giannopoulos; Ioannis Tambourlas	Chara Michael; Ioanna Pissi	Ioannis Tambourlas; Ioanna Pissi
