= Robyn Ashworth =

Welsh international badminton player

Personal information
- Nationality: British (Welsh)
- Born: 26 February 1981

Sport
- Sport: Badminton
Medal record
Representing Wales
Welsh Nationals
Gold medal – first place	2005	women's doubles

Robyn Ashworth (born 26 February 1981) is a former international badminton player from Wales who competed at two Commonwealth Games and is a doubles champion of Wales.

== Biography ==
Ashworth represented Gwent at county level and in 1997 she was the number 1 ranked Welsh U17 and U19 player.

She subsequently represented Wales at international level, gaining her first cap at the 1998 Commonwealth Games in Kuala Lumpur, Malaysia, where she partnered Natasha Groves-Burke in the women's doubles event. At the Games, in addition to the women's doubles, Ashworth participated for the Welsh team in the singles and team events.

Ashworth specialised in doubles play and partnered Matthew Hughes in mixed doubles and Harriett Johnson in women's doubles. She represented the Welsh team again at the 2002 Commonwealth Games in Manchester, England, taking part in the doubles events and continued to represent Wales after the 2002 Games.

Ashworth was the women's doubles champion of Wales at the 2005 Welsh National Badminton Championships.
