= Alexis Blanchflower =

Scottish international badminton player

Personal information
- Nationality: British (Scottish)
- Born: c.1972

Sport
- Sport: Badminton
- Club: Glasgow
Medal record
Portugal International
Gold medal – first place	1997	mixed

Alexis Blanchflower (born c. 1972) is a former international badminton player from Scotland who competed at the Commonwealth Games.

== Biography ==
Blanchflower was based in Glasgow and represented Scotland at international level.

Blanchflower specialised in doubles and in October 1990 was ranked number 3 in doubles in Scotland, with Aileen Nairn and in 1991 won the Scottish U21 title.

By the end of 1991 she was described as one of the best young females coming through but forged a career in doubles rather than singles, representing her nation at the Sudirman Cup.

A lecturer by profession at Bell College in Hamilton, she won the 1997 Portugal International.

Blanchflower represented the Scottish team at the 1998 Commonwealth Games in Kuala Lumpur, Malaysia, where she competed in the badminton events.
