= Tanya Woodward =

English badminton player

Personal information
- Born: Tanya Louise Groves; 7 October 1970 (age 56) Worthing, West Sussex, England

Sport
- Country: England
- Sport: Badminton
- Handedness: Left
- BWF profile
Medal record
Women's badminton
Representing England
European Junior Championships
Silver medal – second place	1989 Manchester	Mixed team

Tanya Louise Woodward (born 7 October 1970; née Groves) is a former English badminton international player and a former national champion.

== Biography ==
Woodward represented Sussex at the national tournament and became an English national champion after winning the English National Badminton Championships women's singles title in 1996.

She was part of the English junior team that won the silver medal at the 1989 European Junior Championships in Manchester.

== Achievements ==
=== IBF International ===
Women's singles
Year	Tournament	Opponent	Score	Result
1990	Portugal International	(England) Julia Mann	3–11, 11–6, 3–11	(silver) Runner-up
1992	Hungarian International	(England) Alison Humby	5–11, 11–6, 5–11	(silver) Runner-up
1994	Mauritius International	(France) Sandra Dimbour	6–11, 11–6, 5–11	(silver) Runner-up
1995	Irish International	(Canada) Doris Piché	11–2, 7–11, 4–11	(silver) Runner-up
1996	Amor International	(England) Alison Humby	5–11, 10–12	(silver) Runner-up
1998	Portugal International	(Russia) Ella Karachkova	4–11, 11–1, 11–6	(gold) Winner

Women's doubles
Year	Tournament	Partner	Opponent	Score	Result
1990	Portugal International	(England) Julia Mann	(Portugal) Maria José Gomes (Portugal) Zamy Gomes	15–3, 15–3	(gold) Winner
1992	Czechoslovakian International	(England) Joanne Davies	(England) Sarah Hore (England) Alison Humby	17–16, 15–10	(gold) Winner
1992	Hungarian International	(England) Joanne Davies	(England) Alison Humby (England) Julia Mann	15–7, 15–5	(gold) Winner
1994	Mauritius International	(England) Joanne Davies	(Malaysia) Norhasikin Amin (Malaysia) Winnie Lee	15–8, 15–10	(gold) Winner
1995	Hungarian International	(England) Alison Humby	(Kazakhstan) Irina Gritsenko (Kazakhstan) Ludmila Okuneva	15–5, 15–7	(gold) Winner
1996	Portugal International	(England) Alison Humby	(England) Emma Constable (England) Tracey Hallam	14–17, 15–4, 7–15	(silver) Runner-up

Mixed doubles
Year	Tournament	Partner	Opponent	Score	Result
1990	Portugal International	(England) Nitin Panesar	(England) Peter Sheppard (England) Julia Mann	15–10, 15–8	(gold) Winner
