= Natasha Groves-Burke =

Welsh international badminton player

Natasha Groves-Burke née Groves
Personal information
- Nationality: British (Welsh)
- Born: Q1. 1973 Worthing, England

Sport
- Sport: Badminton

Natasha Clare Groves-Burke née Groves (born 1973) is a former international badminton player from Wales who competed at the Commonwealth Games.

== Biography ==
Groves was born in 1973 in Worthing. Her sister Tanya Groves later Woodward, was also an international badminton player. In women's doubles play her partners included Sarah Williams, Kelly Morgan and Robyn Ashworth.

In 1995 she married Andrew Burke and played under the name of Natasha Groves-Burke thereafter. She moved to Cardiff where her husband was based and subsequently represented Wales at international level.

At the end of 1996 she was ranked Welsh number 2 in women's doubles. She represented the Welsh team at the 1998 Commonwealth Games in Kuala Lumpur, Malaysia, where she competed in the four events, including the women's doubles event, where she partnered Robyn Ashworth.
