= Masako Sakamoto =

Japanese badminton player (born 1972)

Personal information
- Born: 10 October 1972 (age 53) Tokyo, Japan
- Height: 1.63 m (5 ft 4 in)
- Weight: 57 kg (126 lb)

Sport
- Country: Japan
- Sport: Badminton
- Handedness: Right
- Event: Women's doubles
- BWF profile
Medal record
Women's badminton
Representing Japan
Asian Cup
Bronze medal – third place	1996 Seoul	Women's doubles

Masako Sakamoto (阪本 雅子, Sakamoto Masako; born 10 October 1972) is a Japanese badminton player. She competed in women's doubles at the 1996 Summer Olympics in Atlanta.

== Achievements ==
=== Asian Cup ===
Women's doubles

Year	Venue	Partner	Opponent	Score	Result
1996	Olympic Gymnasium No. 2, Seoul, South Korea	(Japan) Tomomi Matsuo	(Indonesia) Indarti Issolina (Indonesia) Deyana Lomban	8–15, 12–15	Bronze
