= Amparo Lim =

Filipino badminton player

Personal information
- Born: 9 September 1969 (age 57) Manila, Philippines
- Height: 154 cm (5 ft 1 in)

Sport
- Country: Philippines
- Sport: Badminton
- Handedness: Right
- Coached by: Nelson Asuncion

Women's doubles
- Highest ranking: 68 (1997)
- BWF profile
Medal record
Women's badminton
Representing Philippines
Southeast Asian Games
Bronze medal – third place	1997 Jakarta	Women's doubles

Amparo "Weena" Lim (born 9 September 1969) is a Filipino badminton player who competed in the women's singles at the 1996 Summer Olympics.

== Early life ==
Amparo Lim was born on 9 September 1969, in Manila, Philippines, one of five children to Jose "Dondo" V. Lim III and Remedios "Baby" P. Gana. Her elder brother Joey Lim was a basketball tournament organizer. She was coached by Nelson Asuncion.

== Career ==
Lim was the first Philippine badminton player to compete at the Olympics. She participated in the women's singles category at the 1996 Summer Olympics but lost to Poland's Kataryna Krasowska in the first round by 6-11, 5-11. She teamed with Kennie Asuncion to win the women's doubles title at the 1996 Australian Open and secured a bronze in women's singles.

At the next year's Southeast Asian Games, the pair won a bronze medal in women's doubles and became the first Philippine pair to reach the quarter-finals of Vietnam Open. They also have won a bronze at the 2002 U.S. Open's women's double event.

Lim was appointed the Philippine Sports Commissioner in 2000 following the resignation of Tisha Abundo and served in that capacity until March 2002.

== Achievements ==
=== Southeast Asian Games ===
Women's doubles
Year	Venue	Partner	Opponent	Score	Result
1997	Asia-Africa hall, Gelora Bung Karno Sports Complex, Jakarta, Indonesia	(Philippines) Kennie Asuncion	(Indonesia) Eliza Nathanael (Indonesia) Zelin Resiana	10–15, 3–15	Bronze

=== IBF International ===
Women's doubles
Year	Tournament	Partner	Opponent	Score	Result
1996	Australian Open	(Philippines) Kennie Asuncion	(Australia) Rhonda Cator (Australia) Kellie Lucas	15–7, 15–8	(gold) Winner
