= K. Neelima Chowdary =

Indian badminton player

K Neelima Chowdary
Personal information
- Born: 15 September 1977 (age 49) Andhra Pradesh, India
- Height: 161 cm (5 ft 3 in)

Sport
- Country: India
- Sport: Badminton
- Handedness: Right
- Coached by: P. U. Bhaskar Babu
- Event: Women's singles, Women's doubles, Mixed doubles

Women's singles, Women's doubles, Mixed doubles
- BWF profile
Medal record
Women's badminton
Representing India
Commonwealth Games
Bronze medal – third place	1998 Kuala Lumpur	Women's team

K Neelima Chowdary (born 15 September 1977) is an Indian former badminton player.

== Early life ==
Chowdary was born in Andhra Pradesh, India on 15 September 1977. She belongs to the Kammas community of the state.

== Career ==
She started training in Vijayawada under the guidance of Sports Authority of India appointed coach P.U. Bhaskar Babu.

Chowdary started her Badminton career in 1992 playing India's Individual Junior Championships and won the first place in women's doubles category. PVV Lakshmi and Chowdary emerged as top seeded player from that championship.

The winning streak continued in 1994 when Chowdary along with Nirmala Kotnis won India's Individual Junior Championships.

In the game of mixed doubles in 1995, Chowdary along with Sameer Mahesh, won India's Individual Junior Championships. In 1996, Chowdary and Sudha Rani went on to secure the first place in the India's Individual Junior Championships. Playing singles in the International Championships in 1997, Chowdary finished at the fifth spot. The same year Manjusha Kanwar and Chowdary fished fifth in the women's doubles International Championships.

In 1998, Chowdary bagged a silver in while playing singles at the Sri Lanka International Championship. She also represented Indian women team in the 1998 Commonwealth Games and won a bronze. In 2001, Chowdary won the 66th Indian National Badminton Championships while playing women's doubles with D Swetha. This was the year, the All England champion P. Gopichand led the Andhra Pradesh teams for the badminton events of the National Games at the Hansraj Stadium, Jalandhar, Punjab.

In 2002, Chowdary and Cha Deepti played doubles at the 17th Commonwealth Games against Seychelles Island and won the match.

In March 2017, Chowdary participated in the 41st Indian Masters (Veteran) National Badminton Championship Cochin, Kerala. In the 35 plus mixed doubles, Chowdary and Abhinand Shetty played and won against Dhole and Prerana Joshi.

== Achievements ==
=== IBF International ===
Women's singles
Year	Tournament	Opponent	Score	Result
1998	Sri Lanka International	(India) Aparna Popat	11–1, 12–13, 3–11	(silver) Runner-up
1998	India International	(India) Aparna Popat	11–6, 6–11, 8–11	(silver) Runner-up
