= Julia Mann =

British badminton player

Personal information
- Born: 9 August 1971 (age 55) Solihull, England
- Height: 159 cm (5 ft 3 in)
- Weight: 52 kg (115 lb)

Sport
- Country: England
- Sport: Badminton
- Handedness: Right
- Retired: 2006
- Event: Women's singles

Women's singles
- BWF profile
Medal record
Women's badminton
Representing England
Commonwealth Games
Gold medal – first place	1998 Kuala Lumpur	Women's team
Bronze medal – third place	1998 Kuala Lumpur	Women's singles
European Women's Team Championships
Silver medal – second place	2006 Thessalonica	Women's team
European Junior Championships
Silver medal – second place	1989 Manchester	Mixed team

Julia Mann (born 9 August 1971) is a female retired British badminton player.

== Badminton career ==
Mann won the English National Badminton Championships eight times. She holds a record for winning National title seven years consecutively from 1997 to 2003, the highest number of wins in Women's category since the championship began in 1964.

She represented England and won a gold medal in the women's team event and a bronze medal in the singles, at the 1998 Commonwealth Games in Kuala Lumpur, Malaysia. Four year later she competed in the singles during the 2002 Commonwealth Games in Manchester. Mann also reached the quarter-finals of the 2001 All England Open Badminton Championships.

== Achievements ==
=== Commonwealth Games ===
Women's singles
Year	Venue	Opponent	Score	Result
1998	Kuala Lumpur Badminton Stadium; Kuala Lumpur, Malaysia	(India) Aparna Popat	8–11, 13–12, 11–13	Bronze

=== IBF World Grand Prix ===
The World Badminton Grand Prix has been sanctioned by International Badminton Federation (IBF) from 1983 to 2006.

Women's singles
Year	Tournament	Opponent	Score	Result
1994	Scottish Open	(Sweden) Lim Xiaoqing	3–11, 0–11	(silver) Runner-up
2002	U.S. Open	(Sweden) Marina Andrievskaya	11–3, 11–5	(gold) Winner

=== IBF International ===
Women's singles
Year	Tournament	Opponent	Score	Result
1990	Portugal International	(England) Tanya Groves	11–3, 6–11, 11–3	(gold) Winner
1997	Scottish Open	(England) Rebecca Pantaney	11–3, 11–5	(gold) Winner
2002	Portugal International	(England) Tracey Hallam	7–0, 7–2, 7–0	(gold) Winner
2002	Canada Open	(Germany) Petra Overzier	11–3, 5–11, 10–13	(silver) Runner-up
2004	Canada Open	(Canada) Charmaine Reid	11–2, 11–2	(gold) Winner
2005	Iceland International	(Sweden) Sara Persson	11–13, 0–7 retired	(silver) Runner-up

Women's doubles
Year	Tournament	Partner	Opponent	Score	Result
1990	Portugal International	(England) Tanya Groves	(Portugal) Maria José Gomes (Portugal) Zamy Gomes	15–3, 15–3	(gold) Winner
