= Akiko Miyamura =

Japanese badminton player

Personal information
- Nationality: Japanese
- Born: 14 October 1974 (age 50)

Sport
- Sport: Badminton

Akiko Miyamura (宮村 亜貴子, Miyamura Akiko, born 14 October 1974) is a Japanese badminton player. She competed in women's doubles at the 1996 Summer Olympics in Atlanta.

She is a sister of Aiko Miyamura.
