= Katarzyna Krasowska =

Polish badminton player (born 1969)

Personal information
- Nationality: Polish
- Born: Katarzyna Krasowska; 28 September 1969 (age 56) Opole, Opolskie, Poland
- Height: 174 cm (5 ft 9 in)

Sport
- Country: Poland
- Sport: Badminton

Katarzyna Krasowska (born 28 September 1969) is a former Polish female badminton player. She competed at the Olympics representing Poland on 3 occasions (1992, 1996 and 2000).

Krasowska has also been a Polish national badminton champion for nine times as she won the Polish National Badminton Championships in 1991, 1992, 1993, 1994, 1995, 1996, 1997, 1998 and in 2000.
