= Aiko Miyamura =

Japanese badminton player

Personal information
- Born: 11 August 1971 (age 54)

Sport
- Sport: Badminton
Medal record
Women's badminton
Representing Japan
Uber Cup
Bronze medal – third place	1990 Nagoya & Tokyo	Women's team
Asian Games
Bronze medal – third place	1990 Beijing	Women's team
Bronze medal – third place	1994 Hiroshima	Women's team
East Asian Games
Bronze medal – third place	1993 Shanghai	Women's doubles
Bronze medal – third place	1993 Shanghai	Women's team

Aiko Miyamura (宮村 愛子, Miyamura Aiko; born 11 August 1971) is a Japanese badminton player. She competed in women's doubles at the 1996 Summer Olympics in Atlanta. She won bronze medals in the team competition both at the 1990 Asian Games and the 1994 Asian Games.

She is a sister of Akiko Miyamura.
