= Vandanah Seesurun =

Mauritian badminton player (born 1973)

Personal information
- Nationality: Mauritian
- Born: 1 October 1973 (age 52)

Sport
- Sport: Badminton

Vandanah Seesurun (born 1 October 1973) is a Mauritian badminton player. She competed in women's singles and women's doubles at the 1992 Summer Olympics in Barcelona.
