= Gillian Martin (badminton) =

Scottish international badminton player

Personal information
- Nationality: British (Scottish)
- Born: 17 December 1964

Sport
- Sport: Badminton
- Club: Brookfield, Renfrewshire
Medal record
Representing Scotland
Scottish Nationals
| Gold medal – first place | 1988, 98, 99 | singles |

Gillian Martin (born 17 December 1964) is a former international badminton player from Scotland who competed at two Commonwealth Games.

== Biography ==
Martin gained a sports scholarship at the University of Stirling. She was based in Brookfield, Renfrewshire and represented Scotland at international level.

Martin became the Scottish number 1 ranked player and in 1988 won her first singles titles at the Scottish National Badminton Championships at the age of 24.

Martin represented the Scottish team at the 1990 Commonwealth Games in Auckland, New Zealand, where she competed in the badminton events.

At the end of 1994 she was still a leading player in Scotland, winning the West of Scotland Open and the Scottish invitational singles and was undefeated against any other Scottish player that year. She also went on to win two more national singles titles in 1998 and 1999.

Martin went to a second Commonwealth Games in 1998.
