= Kati Kraaving =

Estonian badminton player (born 1980)

Kati Kraaving (born 1 July 1980) is an Estonian badminton player.

She was born in Tallinn. In 2002 she graduated from Tallinn University of Technology with a degree in business management.

She began her badminton career in 1990, coached by Koit Muru. She is two-times (1996 and 1998) Estonian champion in badminton. 1996–2001 she was a member of Estonian national badminton team.

She is also played squash, and also won Estonian championships.
