= Irina Gritsenko =

French-Kazakhstani badminton player

Irina Gritsenko (born 13 February 1968) is a badminton player from Kazakhstan who later played for France.

== Career ==
Gritsenko took part at the 1993, 1995, 1999 and 2001 IBF World Championships. Her best result was the rank of 17 in 1995. In 2002, she won the women's doubles title at the Orleans International and became the runner-up in the women's singles and mixed doubles event. She also won the 2004 Strasbourg International (CEBA) tournament in France, the Kazakhstan national championships 35 times, and the Alsace championships 10 times.
