= Diana Filipova =

Bulgarian badminton player

Personal information
- Nationality: Bulgarian
- Born: 11 July 1971 (age 53)

Sport
- Sport: Badminton

Diana Filipova (born 11 July 1971) is a Bulgarian badminton player. She competed in women's doubles at the 1992 Summer Olympics in Barcelona.
