= 1990 Uber Cup qualification =

Tournament details
- Dates: 18 – 25 February 1990
- Location: Asian zone: Kuala Lumpur; European zone: Villach

The qualifying process for the 1990 Uber Cup took place from 18 to 25 February 1990 to decide the final teams which will play in the final tournament.

== Qualification process ==
The qualification process was divided into two regions, the Asian Zone and the European Zone. Seeded teams received a bye into the second round while unseeded teams competed in the first round for a place in the second round. The first two rounds were played in a round-robin format. Teams in the second round competed for a place in the knockout stages. Semi-final winners in each zone were guaranteed qualification for the final tournament to be held in Nagoya and Tokyo while the remaining teams competed in a third place playoff match for a place in the final tournament.

China qualified for the final tournament as defending champions while Japan qualified as hosts.

=== Qualified teams ===
Country	Qualified as	Qualified on	Final appearance
Japan	1990 Uber Cup hosts	28 November 1988	9th
China	1988 Uber Cup winners	4 June 1988	4th
Indonesia	Asian Zone winners	25 February 1990	11th
South Korea	Asian Zone runners-up	25 February 1990	4th
Denmark	European Zone winners	25 February 1990	8th
Sweden	European Zone runners-up	25 February 1990	2nd
Netherlands	European Zone semi-finalists	25 February 1990	2nd
England	European Zone semi-finalists	25 February 1990	9th

== Asian Zone ==
The qualification rounds for the Asian Zone were held from 18 to 25 February at Stadium Negara in Kuala Lumpur, Malaysia. Thirteen teams took part in qualifying for the final tournament, with Macau making their debut in the tournament. Zambia withdrew from the tournament.

=== First round ===
==== Group A ====
Pos	Team	Pld	W	L	MF	MA	MD	Pts	Qualification
1	Australia	3	3	0	15	0	+15	3	Advance to second round
2	Singapore	3	2	1	8	7	+1	2	
3	Sri Lanka	3	1	2	6	9	−3	1	
4	Mexico	3	0	3	2	13	−11	0	

Source: New Straits Times

Australia
5
Stadium Negara
18 February 1990

Sri Lanka
0

		Result
1	Anna Lao	2 – 0 (11–4, 11–0)	Sriyani Deepika
2	Rhonda Cator	2 – 0 (11–4, 11–4)	Yasintha Liyanage
3	Lisa Bryant	2 – 0 (12–9, 12–11)	Kaushalya Dissanayake
4	Lisa Bryant; Tracey Small	2 – 0 (15–10, 15–3)	Sriyani Deepika; Nilusha Seneviratne
5	Linda Best; Anna Lao	2 – 0 (15–5, 15–1)	Kaushalya Dissanayake; Yasintha Liyanage

Singapore
5
Stadium Negara
18 February 1990

Mexico
0

		Result
1	Zarinah Abdullah	2 – 0 (11–5, 11–1)	María de la Paz Luna
2	Choy Leng Siong	2 – 0 (11–0, 11–0)	Claudia Cruz
3	Soo Chiew Ming	2 – 0 (11–0, 11–1)	Gabriela Melgoza
4	Choy Leng Siong; Irene Lee	2 – 0 (15–2, 15–9)	María de la Paz Luna; Gabriela Melgoza
5	Ho Kam Meng; Zarinah Abdullah	2 – 0 (15–4, 15–1)	Claudia Cruz; Mónica Rojas

Australia
5
Stadium Negara
19 February 1988

Singapore
0

		Result
1	Anna Lao	2 – 0 (11–1, 11–1)	Zarinah Abdullah
2	Rhonda Cator	2 – 0 (11–6, 11–5)	Choy Leng Siong
3	Lisa Bryant	2 – 0 (11–9, 11–7)	Irene Lee
4	Rhonda Cator; Anna Lao	2 – 0 (15–4, 15–4)	Ho Kam Meng; Zarinah Abdullah
5	Lisa Bryant; Tracey Small	2 – 0 (15–3, 18–13)	Choy Leng Siong; Soo Chiew Ming

Sri Lanka
4
Stadium Negara
19 February 1988

Mexico
1

		Result
1	Sriyani Deepika	1 – 2 (7–11, 11–7, 4–11)	María de la Paz Luna
2	Yasintha Liyanage	2 – 0 (11–9, 11–3)	Gabriela Melgoza
3	Kaushalya Dissanayake	2 – 0 (11–4, 11–1)	Mónica Rojas
4	Sriyani Deepika; Nilusha Seneviratne	2 – 0 (15–8, 15–3)	María de la Paz Luna; Gabriela Melgoza
5	Kaushalya Dissanayake; Yasintha Liyanage	2 – 0 (15–7, 15–5)	Claudia Cruz; Mónica Rojas

Singapore
3
Stadium Negara
20 February 1990

Sri Lanka
2

		Result
1	Zarinah Abdullah	2 – 0 (11–1, 11–4)	Sriyani Deepika
2	Choy Leng Siong	2 – 0 (11–4, 11–4)	Yasintha Liyanage
3	Soo Chiew Ming	0 – 2 (10–12, 6–11)	Kaushalya Dissanayake
4	Choy Leng Siong; Irene Lee	2 – 0 (15–9, 15–6)	Sriyani Deepika; Nilusha Seneviratne
5	Soo Chiew Ming; Zarinah Abdullah	0 – 2 (10–15, 5–15)	Kaushalya Dissanayake; Yasintha Liyanage

Australia
5
Stadium Negara
20 February 1990

Mexico
0

		Result
1	Anna Lao	2 – 0 (11–1, 11–1)	María de la Paz Luna
2	Rhonda Cator	2 – 0 (11–5, 11–7)	Claudia Cruz
3	Tracey Small	2 – 0 (11–1, 11–1)	Mónica Rojas
4	Lisa Bryant; Tracey Small	2 – 0 (15–0, 15–3)	María de la Paz Luna; Gabriela Melgoza
5	Linda Best; Donna Powell	2 – 0 (15–2, 15–5)	Claudia Cruz; Mónica Rojas

==== Group B ====
Pos	Team	Pld	W	L	MF	MA	MD	Pts	Qualification
1	India	2	2	0	10	0	+10	2	Advance to second round
2	Macau	2	1	1	3	7	−4	1	
3	Nepal	2	0	2	2	8	−6	0	
4	Zambia	0	0	0	0	0	0	0	Withdrew

Source: New Straits Times

India
5
Stadium Negara
18 February 1990

Nepal
0

		Result
1	Madhumita Bisht	2 – 0 (11–3, 11–1)	Rajani Joshi Shrestha
2	Deepti Thanekar	2 – 0 (11–3, 11–0)	Kalpana Rana Shrestha
3	Seema Bhandari	2 – 0 (11–1, 11–0)	Reema Shrestha
4	Madhumita Bisht; Sudha Padmanabhan	2 – 0 (15–3, 15–3)	Reema Shrestha; Subha Shrestha
5	Archana Deodhar; Manjusha Pavangadkar	2 – 0 (15–3, 15–1)	Rajani Joshi Shrestha; Kalpana Rana Shrestha

India
5
Stadium Negara
19 February 1990

Macau
0

		Result
1	Madhumita Bisht	2 – 0 (11–1, 11–0)	Io Chao Leng
2	Deepti Thanekar	2 – 0 (11–2, 11–1)	Choi Sok Cheng
3	Seema Bhandari	2 – 0 (11–0, 11–0)	Kong Wai Kuan
4	Madhumita Bisht; Sudha Padmanabhan	2 – 0 (15–3, 15–0)	Lee Wong Sau Har; Yeung Sai Ip
5	Archana Deodhar; Manjusha Pavangadkar	2 – 0 (18–14, 15–9)	Choi Sok Cheng; Io Chao Leng

Nepal
2
Stadium Negara
20 February 1990

Macau
3

		Result
1	Rajani Joshi Shrestha	0 – 2 (4–11, 2–11)	Io Chao Leng
2	Kalpana Rana Shrestha	2 – 1 (11–0, 5–11, 11–8)	Choi Sok Cheng
3	Reema Shrestha	0 – 2 (5–11, 8–11)	Kong Wai Kuan
4	Reema Shrestha; Subha Shrestha	2 – 0 (15–2, 17–14)	Lee Wong Sau Har; Yeung Sai Ip
5	Rajani Joshi Shrestha; Kalpana Rana Shrestha	0 – 3 (1–15, 7–15)	Choi Sok Cheng; Io Chao Leng

=== Second round ===
==== Group X ====
Pos	Team	Pld	W	L	MF	MA	MD	Pts	Qualification
1	South Korea	3	3	0	15	0	+15	3	Advance to knockout stage
2	Australia	3	2	1	7	8	−1	2	Advance to knockout stage
3	Chinese Taipei	3	1	2	6	9	−3	1	
4	Malaysia	3	0	3	2	13	−11	0	

Source: New Straits Times

Malaysia
1
Stadium Negara
21 February 1990

Australia
4

		Result
1	Lee Wai Leng	0 – 2 (2–11, 3–11)	Anna Lao
2	Lim Siew Choon	0 – 2 (4–11, 6–11)	Rhonda Cator
3	Tan Lee Wai	0 – 2 (9–11, 11–12)	Lisa Bryant
4	Lee Wai Leng; Lim Siew Choon	2 – 0 (15–10, 17–15)	Rhonda Cator; Anna Lao
5	Tan Lee Wai; Tan Sui Hoon	0 – 2 (17–18, 8–15)	Lisa Bryant; Tracey Small

South Korea
5
Stadium Negara
21 February 1990

Chinese Taipei
0

		Result
1	Hwang Hye-young	2 – 0 (11–3, 11–4)	Lee Chien-mei
2	Lee Young-suk	2 – 0 (11–0, 11–2)	Sun Tsai-ching
3	Lee Heung-soon	2 – 0 (11–1, 11–4)	Chen Hsiao-li
4	Chung Myung-hee; Shim Eun-jung	2 – 0 (15–1, 15–3)	Lee Chien-mei; Sun Tsai-ching
5	Chung So-young; Shon Hye-joo	2 – 0 (15–10, 17–14)	Kang Chia-i; Lin Hui-hsu

Malaysia
1
Stadium Negara
22 February 1990

Chinese Taipei
4

		Result
1	Tan Lee Wai	0 – 2 (2–11, 1–11)	Lee Chien-mei
2	Tan Saik Khim	0 – 2 (0–11, 3–11)	Sun Tsai-ching
3	Wong Mee Hung	1 – 2 (11–6, 5–11, 11–12)	Chen Hsiao-li
4	Lee Wai Leng; Lim Siew Choon	0 – 2 (3–15, 11–15)	Lee Chien-mei; Sun Tsai-ching
5	Tan Lee Wai; Tan Sui Hoon	2 – 0 (15–10, 15–3)	Kang Chia-i; Lin Hui-hsu

South Korea
5
Stadium Negara
22 February 1990

Australia
0

		Result
1	Lee Young-suk	2 – 0 (11–1, 11–4)	Tracey Small
2	Lee Heung-soon	2 – 0 (11–3, 11–1)	Donna Powell
3	Shon Hye-joo	2 – 0 (11–1, 11–3)	Linda Best
4	Chung Myung-hee; Hwang Hye-young	2 – 0 (15–3, 15–1)	Rhonda Cator; Anna Lao
5	Chung So-young; Shim Eun-jung	2 – 0 (15–1, 15–1)	Lisa Bryant; Tracey Small

South Korea
5
Stadium Negara
23 February 1990

Malaysia
0

		Result
1	Lee Heung-soon	2 – 0 (11–4, 11–6)	Lee Wai Leng
2	Shon Hye-joo	2 – 0 (11–8, 11–0)	Tan Saik Khim
3	Shim Eun-jung	2 – 0 (11–1, 11–1)	Wong Mee Hung
4	Chung Myung-hee; Shim Eun-jung	2 – 0 (15–1, 15–4)	Lim Siew Choon; Tan Sui Hoon
5	Hwang Hye-young; Lee Young-suk	2 – 0 (15–4, 15–8)	Tan Lee Wai; Tan Saik Khim

Chinese Taipei
2
Stadium Negara
23 February 1990

Australia
3

		Result
1	Lee Chien-mei	0 – 2 (4–11, 0–11)	Anna Lao
2	Sun Tsai-ching	1 – 2 (12–9, 6–11, 5–11)	Rhonda Cator
3	Chen Hsiao-li	2 – 1 (5–11, 11–4, 11–4)	Lisa Bryant
4	Lee Chien-mei; Sun Tsai-ching	0 – 2 (8–15, 13–15)	Rhonda Cator; Anna Lao
5	Kang Chia-i; Lin Hui-hsu	2 – 0 (15–9, 15–8)	Lisa Bryant; Tracey Small

==== Group Y ====
Pos	Team	Pld	W	L	MF	MA	MD	Pts	Qualification
1	Indonesia	3	3	0	15	0	+15	3	Advance to knockout stage
2	Thailand	3	2	1	8	7	+1	2	Advance to knockout stage
3	India	3	1	2	6	9	−3	1	
4	New Zealand	3	0	3	1	14	−13	0	

Source: New Straits Times

Indonesia
5
Stadium Negara
21 February 1990

New Zealand
0

		Result
1	Susi Susanti	2 – 0 (11–2, 11–9)	Julie Still
2	Lilik Sudarwati	2 – 0 (11–1, 11–2)	Toni Whittaker
3	Kho Mei Hwa	2 – 0 (11–0, 11–3)	Lynne Horne
4	Erma Sulistianingsih; Rosiana Tendean	2 – 0 (15–1, 15–3)	Jane Clarke; Toni Whittaker
5	Verawaty Fadjrin; Ivana Lie	2 – 0 (15–7, 15–0)	Lynne Horne; Rhona Robertson

Thailand
3
Stadium Negara
21 February 1990

India
2

		Result
1	Somharuthai Jaroensiri	2 – 1 (2–11, 11–8, 12–10)	Madhumita Bisht
2	Ladawan Mulasartsatorn	0 – 2 (4–11, 9–11)	Deepti Thanekar
3	Penpan Klangthamniem	1 – 2 (6–11, 12–10, 8–11)	Seema Bhandari
4	Ladawan Mulasartsatorn; Piyathip Sansaniyakulvilai	2 – 0 (15–9, 15–2)	Madhumita Bisht; Sudha Padmanabhan
5	Plernta Boonyarit; Somharuthai Jaroensiri	2 – 0 (15–1, 15–2)	Archana Deodhar; Manjusha Pavangadkar

Indonesia
5
Stadium Negara
22 February 1990

India
0

		Result
1	Susi Susanti	2 – 0 (11–8, 11–4)	Madhumita Bisht
2	Minarti Timur	0 – 2 (11–6, 2–11, 12–9)	Deepti Thanekar
3	Lilik Sudarwati	2 – 0 (11–2, 11–2)	Seema Bhandari
4	Erma Sulistianingsih; Rosiana Tendean	2 – 0 (15–0, 15–6)	Archana Deodhar; Manjusha Pavangadkar
5	Verawaty Fadjrin; Yanti Kusmiati	2 – 0 (15–1, 15–2)	Seema Bhandari; Sudha Padmanabhan

Thailand
5
Stadium Negara
22 February 1990

New Zealand
0

		Result
1	Somharuthai Jaroensiri	2 – 0 (11–0, 11–4)	Julie Still
2	Ladawan Mulasartsatorn	2 – 0 (11–8, 11–0)	Toni Whittaker
3	Pornsawan Plungwech	2 – 0 (11–0, 11–5)	Rhona Robertson
4	Ladawan Mulasartsatorn; Piyathip Sansaniyakulvilai	2 – 0 (15–3, 15–4)	Jane Clarke; Toni Whittaker
5	Plernta Boonyarit; Somharuthai Jaroensiri	2 – 0 (15–8, 15–11)	Lynne Horne; Rhona Robertson

Indonesia
5
Stadium Negara
23 February 1990

Thailand
0

		Result
1	Susi Susanti	2 – 0 (11–4, 11–4)	Somharuthai Jaroensiri
2	Lilik Sudarwati	0 – 2 (11–8, 11–2)	Pornsawan Plungwech
3	Kho Mei Hwa	2 – 0 (11–1, 12–9)	Plernta Boonyarit
4	Erma Sulistianingsih; Rosiana Tendean	2 – 0 (15–5, 15–11)	Ladawan Mulasartsatorn; Piyathip Sansaniyakulvilai
5	Verawaty Fadjrin; Ivana Lie	2 – 0 (15–1, 15–3)	Plernta Boonyarit; Somharuthai Jaroensiri

New Zealand
1
Stadium Negara
23 February 1990

India
4

		Result
1	Julie Still	0 – 2 (5–11, 1–11)	Madhumita Bisht
2	Toni Whittaker	1 – 2 (11–5, 5–11, 2–11)	Deepti Thanekar
3	Lynne Horne	0 – 2 (2–11, 0–11)	Seema Bhandari
4	Jane Clarke; Toni Whittaker	2 – 0 (15–9, 15–7)	Archana Deodhar; Manjusha Pavangadkar
5	Lynne Horne; Rhona Robertson	0 – 2 (7–15, 10–15)	Seema Bhandari; Madhumita Bisht

=== Knockout stage ===
Semi-finals
South Korea	5
Thailand	0
Australia	0
Indonesia	5

Final
South Korea	2
Indonesia	3
Third place
Thailand	3
Australia	2

==== Semi-finals ====
South Korea
5
Stadium Negara
24 February 1990

Thailand
0

		Result
1	Hwang Hye-young	2 – 0 (11–2, 11–2)	Penpan Klangthamniem
2	Lee Young-suk	2 – 0 (11–4, 11–4)	Pornsawan Plungwech
3	Lee Heung-soon	2 – 0 (11–3, 11–0)	Plernta Boonyarit
4	Chung So-young; Shim Eun-jung	2 – 0 (15–5, 15–5)	Somharuthai Jaroensiri; Piyathip Sansaniyakulvilai
5	Hwang Hye-young; Lee Heung-soon	2 – 0 (15–4, 15–5)	Ladawan Mulasartsatorn; Penpan Klangthamniem

Indonesia
5
Stadium Negara
24 February 1990

Australia
0

		Result
1	Susi Susanti	2 – 0 (11–2, 11–6)	Rhonda Cator
2	Minarti Timur	2 – 0 (11–3, 11–2)	Tracey Small
3	Lilik Sudarwati	2 – 0 (11–1, 11–2)	Donna Powell
4	Erma Sulistianingsih; Rosiana Tendean	2 – 0 (15–2, 15–2)	Lisa Bryant; Tracey Small
5	Verawaty Fadjrin; Yanti Kusmiati	2 – 0 (15–4, 15–2)	Linda Best; Anna Lao

==== Third place ====
Thailand
3
Stadium Negara
25 February 1990

Australia
2

		Result
1	Somharuthai Jaroensiri	1 – 2 (5–11, 11–8, 3–11)	Anna Lao
2	Ladawan Mulasartsatorn	2 – 1 (11–6, 8–11, 11–1)	Rhonda Cator
3	Pornsawan Plungwech	2 – 1 (11–2, 11–12, 11–8)	Lisa Bryant
4	Ladawan Mulasartsatorn; Piyathip Sansaniyakulvilai	2 – 0 (15–5, 15–6)	Rhonda Cator; Anna Lao
5	Plernta Boonyarit; Somharuthai Jaroensiri	0 – 2 (11–15, 10–15)	Lisa Bryant; Tracey Small

==== Final ====
South Korea
2
Stadium Negara
25 February 1990

Indonesia
3

		Result
1	Lee Young-suk	2 – 0 (11–2, 11–5)	Susi Susanti
2	Lee Heung-soon	1 – 2 (11–6, 6–11, 6–11)	Minarti Timur
3	Shon Hye-joo	1 – 2 (11–3, 7–11, 2–11)	Lilik Sudarwati
4	Chung Myung-hee; Hwang Hye-young	1 – 2 (15–8, 16–17, 9–15)	Erma Sulistianingsih; Rosiana Tendean
5	Chung So-young; Shim Eun-jung	2 – 0 (15–8, 15–9)	Verawaty Fadjrin; Yanti Kusmiati

== European Zone ==
The European qualifying rounds were held in the St. Martiner Street Sports Hall in Villach, Austria. Twenty-seven teams took part in the qualifiers. Peru withdrew from the tournament while Nigeria pulled out of the competition before the draw was announced.

=== First round ===
==== Group A ====
Pos	Team	Pld	W	L	MF	MA	MD	Pts	Qualification
1	Czechoslovakia	3	2	1	8	7	+1	2	Advance to second round
2	Ireland	3	2	1	8	7	+1	2	
3	Norway	3	1	2	7	8	−1	1	
4	France	3	1	2	7	8	−1	1	

Source: New Straits Times

Ireland
3
St. Martiner Street Sports Hall
19 February 1990

France
2

		Result
1	Ciara Doheny	2 – 1	Sandra Dimbour
2	Carol Munster	1 – 2	Christelle Mol
3	Ann O’Sullivan	2 – 1	Élodie Mansuy
4	Ciara Doheny; Ann O’Sullivan	2 – 1	Virginie Delvingt; Christelle Mol
5	Carol Munster; Sian Williams	1 – 2	Élodie Mansuy; Rosita Rios

Norway
2
St. Martiner Street Sports Hall
19 February 1990

Czechoslovakia
3

		Result
1	Ellen Berg	1 – 2	Adela Šimurková
2	Tove Hol	2 – 1	Ludmila Šimáková
3	Gry Kirsti Solberg	1 – 2	Veronika Vopálenská
4	Camilla Silwer; Marianne Wikdal	2 – 0	Ludmila Šimáková; Adela Šimurková
5	Ellen Berg; Tove Hol	0 – 2	Eva Lacinová; Jitka Lacinová

Ireland
3
St. Martiner Street Sports Hall
20 February 1990

Norway
2

		Result
1	Ciara Doheny	2 – 1	Ellen Berg
2	Carol Munster	1 – 2	Tove Hol
3	Ann O’Sullivan	2 – 1	Gry Kirsti Solberg
4	Ciara Doheny; Ann O’Sullivan	1 – 2	Camilla Silwer; Marianne Wikdal
5	Carol Munster; Sian Williams	2 – 1	Ellen Berg; Tove Hol

France
3
St. Martiner Street Sports Hall
20 February 1990

Czechoslovakia
2

		Result
1	Sandra Dimbour	1 – 2	Adela Šimurková
2	Christelle Mol	2 – 1	Ludmila Šimáková
3	Élodie Mansuy	2 – 1	Veronika Vopálenská
4	Virginie Delvingt; Christelle Mol	2 – 1	Ludmila Šimáková; Adela Šimurková
5	Élodie Mansuy; Rosita Rios	0 – 2	Eva Lacinová; Jitka Lacinová

Ireland
2
St. Martiner Street Sports Hall
21 February 1990

Czechoslovakia
3

		Result
1	Ciara Doheny	1 – 2	Adela Šimurková
2	Carol Munster	1 – 2	Ludmila Šimáková
3	Ann O’Sullivan	2 – 1	Veronika Vopálenská
4	Ciara Doheny; Ann O’Sullivan	2 – 0	Ludmila Šimáková; Adela Šimurková
5	Carol Munster; Sian Williams	1 – 2	Eva Lacinová; Jitka Lacinová

Norway
3
St. Martiner Street Sports Hall
21 February 1990

France
2

		Result
1	Ellen Berg	0 – 2 (10–12, 10–12)	Sandra Dimbour
2	Tove Hol	0 – 2 (9–12, 7–11)	Christelle Mol
3	Camilla Silwer	2 – 1 (11–6, 9–12, 11–3)	Élodie Mansuy
4	Camilla Silwer; Marianne Wikdal	2 – 0 (15–5, 18–14)	Virginie Delvingt; Christelle Mol
5	Tove Hol; Gry Kirsti Solberg	2 – 1 (6–15, 15–2, 15–4)	Eva Lacinová; Jitka Lacinová

==== Group B ====
Pos	Team	Pld	W	L	MF	MA	MD	Pts	Qualification
1	Bulgaria	3	3	0	14	1	+13	3	Advance to second round
2	Iceland	3	2	1	9	6	+3	2	
3	Belgium	3	1	2	7	8	−1	1	
4	Italy	3	0	3	0	15	−15	0	
5	Peru	0	0	0	0	0	0	0	Withdrew

Source: New Straits Times

Belgium
5
St. Martiner Street Sports Hall
19 February 1990

Italy
0

		Result
1	Marie-Christine Donnay	2 – 0	Petra Schrott
2	Christine Jacobs	2 – 0	Maria Luisa Mur
3	Sabine Langenaekens	2 – 0	Claudia Nista
4	Marie-Christine Donnay; Christine Jacobs	2 – 0	Maria Luisa Mur; Petra Schrott
5	Sabine Langenaekens; Ingrid Swiggers	2 – 0	Resi Klotzner; Claudia Nista

Iceland
1
St. Martiner Street Sports Hall
19 February 1990

Bulgaria
4

		Result
1	Elísabet Þórðardóttir	1 – 2	Diana Koleva
2	Þórdís Edwald	0 – 2	Diana Filipova
3	Guðrún Júlíusdóttir	1 – 2	Emilia Dimitrova
4	Þórdís Edwald; Guðrún Júlíusdóttir	2 – 0	Diana Filipova; Diana Koleva
5	Birna Petersen; Elísabet Þórðardóttir	1 – 2	Emilia Dimitrova; Neli Nedyalkova

Belgium
0
St. Martiner Street Sports Hall
20 February 1990

Bulgaria
5

		Result
1	Marie-Christine Donnay	1 – 2	Diana Koleva
2	Christine Jacobs	1 – 2	Diana Filipova
3	Sabine Langenaekens	1 – 2	Emilia Dimitrova
4	Marie-Christine Donnay; Christine Jacobs	1 – 2	Diana Filipova; Diana Koleva
5	Sabine Langenaekens; Ingrid Swiggers	1 – 2	Emilia Dimitrova; Neli Nedyalkova

Iceland
5
St. Martiner Street Sports Hall
20 February 1990

Italy
0

		Result
1	Þórdís Edwald	2 – 0	Petra Schrott
2	Guðrún Júlíusdóttir	2 – 0	Maria Luisa Mur
3	Inga Kjartansdóttir	2 – 0	Claudia Nista
4	Þórdís Edwald; Guðrún Júlíusdóttir	2 – 0	Maria Luisa Mur; Petra Schrott
5	Birna Petersen; Elísabet Þórðardóttir	2 – 0	Resi Klotzner; Claudia Nista

Belgium
2
St. Martiner Street Sports Hall
21 February 1990

Iceland
3

		Result
1	Marie-Christine Donnay	2 – 1 (7–11, 11–5, 11–6)	Þórdís Edwald
2	Christine Jacobs	2 – 1 (1–11, 11–7, 11–4)	Guðrún Júlíusdóttir
3	Sabine Langenaekens	0 – 2 (8–11, 10–12)	Birna Petersen
4	Marie-Christine Donnay; Christine Jacobs	0 – 2 (9–15, 2–15)	Þórdís Edwald; Elísabet Þórðardóttir
5	Sabine Langenaekens; Ingrid Swiggers	0 – 2 (6–15, 0–15)	Guðrún Júlíusdóttir; Inga Kjartansdóttir

Bulgaria
5
St. Martiner Street Sports Hall
21 February 1990

Italy
0

		Result
1	Diana Koleva	2 – 0 (11–0, 11–1)	Petra Schrott
2	Diana Filipova	2 – 0 (11–1, 11–2)	Maria Luisa Mur
3	Emilia Dimitrova	2 – 0 (11–1, 11–2)	Resi Klotzner
4	Diana Koleva; Diana Filipova	2 – 0 (15–7, 15–2)	Maria Luisa Mur; Petra Schrott
5	Emilia Dimitrova; Neli Nedyalkova	2 – 0 (15–7, 15–2)	Resi Klotzner; Claudia Nista

==== Group C ====
Pos	Team	Pld	W	L	MF	MA	MD	Pts	Qualification
1	West Germany	4	4	0	20	0	+20	4	Advance to second round
2	Wales	4	3	1	13	7	+6	3	
3	Finland	4	2	2	9	11	−2	2	
4	Switzerland	4	1	3	6	14	−8	1	
5	Hungary	4	0	4	2	18	−16	0	

Source: New Straits Times

Wales
5
St. Martiner Street Sports Hall
19 February 1990

Hungary
0

		Result
1	Gail Davies	2 – 0	Csilla Fórián
2	Cathy Vigar	2 – 0	Ildiko Vigh
3	Nicky Badman	2 – 0	Andrea Harsági
4	Caroline Grice; Sarah Williams	2 – 0	Csilla Fórián; Ildiko Vigh
5	Gail Davies; Hilary Tarleton	2 – 0	Andrea Dakó; Adrienn Kocsis

Finland
4
St. Martiner Street Sports Hall
19 February 1990

Switzerland
1

		Result
1	Nina Sundberg	2 – 0 (11–3, 11–2)	Silvia Albrecht
2	Kristiina Tainio	2 – 1 (11–4, 7–11, 11–8)	Sarah Häring
3	Susanna Dahlberg	2 – 0 (11–5, 11–4)	Bettina Gfeller
4	Kristiina Tainio; Ulrika von Pfaler	0 – 2 (4–15, 12–15)	Liselotte Blumer; Bettina Gfeller
5	Pia Pajunen; Nina Sundberg	2 – 0 (15–7, 15–5)	Silvia Albrecht; Sarah Häring

West Germany
5
St. Martiner Street Sports Hall
20 February 1990

Switzerland
0

		Result
1	Katrin Schmidt	2 – 0	Silvia Albrecht
2	Christine Skropke	2 – 0	Sarah Häring
3	Andrea Findhammer	2 – 0	Bettina Gfeller
4	Katrin Schmidt; Anne-Katrin Seid	2 – 0	Liselotte Blumer; Bettina Gfeller
5	Nicole Baldewein; Kerstin Ubben	2 – 0	Silvia Albrecht; Sarah Häring

Finland
2
St. Martiner Street Sports Hall
20 February 1990

Wales
3

		Result
1	Nina Sundberg	1 – 2 (2–11, 11–3, 5–11)	Gail Davies
2	Kristiina Tainio	2 – 0 (11–1, 11–8)	Cathy Vigar
3	Susanna Dahlberg	2 – 0 (11–3, 11–1)	Nicky Badman
4	Kristiina Tainio; Ulrika von Pfaler	1 – 2 (15–11, 7–15, 10–15)	Caroline Grice; Sarah Williams
5	Pia Pajunen; Nina Sundberg	0 – 2 (8–15, 5–15)	Gail Davies; Hilary Tarleton

West Germany
5
St. Martiner Street Sports Hall
20 February 1990

Finland
0

		Result
1	Katrin Schmidt	2 – 0 (11–5, 11–0)	Nina Sundberg
2	Christine Skropke	2 – 0 (11–2, 11–3)	Kristiina Tainio
3	Andrea Findhammer	2 – 0 (11–6, 11–1)	Susanna Dahlberg
4	Katrin Schmidt; Anne-Katrin Seid	2 – 0 (15–2, 15–10)	Kristiina Tainio; Ulrika von Pfaler
5	Nicole Baldewein; Kerstin Ubben	2 – 0 (15–3, 15–4)	Susanna Dahlberg; Pia Pajunen

Switzerland
5
St. Martiner Street Sports Hall
20 February 1990

Hungary
0

		Result
1	Silvia Albrecht	2 – 1	Csilla Fórián
2	Sarah Häring	2 – 0	Ildiko Vigh
3	Bettina Gfeller	2 – 0	Andrea Harsági
4	Liselotte Blumer; Bettina Gfeller	2 – 0	Csilla Fórián; Ildiko Vigh
5	Silvia Albrecht; Sarah Häring	2 – 0	Andrea Dakó; Adrienn Kocsis

West Germany
5
St. Martiner Street Sports Hall
21 February 1990

Hungary
0

		Result
1	Katrin Schmidt	2 – 0	Csilla Fórián
2	Christine Skropke	2 – 0	Ildiko Vigh
3	Andrea Findhammer	2 – 0	Andrea Harsági
4	Katrin Schmidt; Anne-Katrin Seid	2 – 0	Csilla Fórián; Ildiko Vigh
5	Nicole Baldewein; Kerstin Ubben	2 – 0	Andrea Dakó; Adrienn Kocsis

Switzerland
0
St. Martiner Street Sports Hall
21 February 1990

Wales
5

		Result
1	Silvia Albrecht	0 – 2	Gail Davies
2	Sarah Häring	1 – 2	Cathy Vigar
3	Bettina Gfeller	1 – 2	Nicky Badman
4	Liselotte Blumer; Bettina Gfeller	0 – 2	Caroline Grice; Sarah Williams
5	Silvia Albrecht; Sarah Häring	1 – 2	Gail Davies; Hilary Tarleton

West Germany
5
St. Martiner Street Sports Hall
21 February 1990

Wales
0

		Result
1	Katrin Schmidt	2 – 0	Gail Davies
2	Christine Skropke	2 – 0	Cathy Vigar
3	Andrea Findhammer	2 – 0	Nicky Badman
4	Katrin Schmidt; Anne-Katrin Seid	2 – 0	Caroline Grice; Sarah Williams
5	Nicole Baldewein; Kerstin Ubben	2 – 0	Gail Davies; Hilary Tarleton

Finland
3
St. Martiner Street Sports Hall
21 February 1990

Hungary
2

		Result
1	Nina Sundberg	2 – 0 (11–5, 11–3)	Csilla Fórián
2	Kristiina Tainio	1 – 2 (12–10, 8–11, 3–11)	Ildiko Vigh
3	Susanna Dahlberg	2 – 0 (11–3, 11–4)	Andrea Harsági
4	Kristiina Tainio; Ulrika von Pfaler	1 – 2 (5–15, 15–9, 9–15)	Csilla Fórián; Ildiko Vigh
5	Susanna Dahlberg; Pia Pajunen	2 – 0 (15–12, 15–2)	Andrea Dakó; Adrienn Kocsis

==== Group D ====
Pos	Team	Pld	W	L	MF	MA	MD	Pts	Qualification
1	United States	3	3	0	13	2	+11	3	Advance to second round
2	North Korea	3	2	1	8	7	+1	2	
3	Austria	3	1	2	8	7	+1	1	
4	Spain	3	0	3	1	14	−13	0	

Source: New Straits Times

Spain
1
St. Martiner Street Sports Hall
19 February 1990

United States
4

		Result
1	Cristina González	2 – 0 (11–6, 11–8)	Linda Safarik-Tong
2	Leonor Gallardo	0 – 2 (2–11, 0–11)	Jenny Chan
3	Aída Rodríguez	1 – 2 (7–11, 11–7, 2–11)	Erika von Heiland
4	Leonor Gallardo; Aída Rodríguez	0 – 2 (6–15, 6–15)	Linda French; Linda Safarik-Tong
5	Cristina González; Dolores Marco	0 – 2 (5–15, 9–15)	Ann French; Joy Kitzmiller

Austria
2
St. Martiner Street Sports Hall
19 February 1990

North Korea
3

		Result
1	Sabine Aberer	1 – 2	Pak Sun-bok
2	Brigitte Lackner	1 – 2	Ra Son-hui
3	Sigrun Ploner	2 – 0	Jong Yong-mi
4	Brigitte Lackner; Manuela Lassinger	1 – 2	Kim Myong-sun; Pak Sun-bok
5	Sabine Aberer; Sigrun Ploner	2 – 1	Jong Yong-mi; Rim Myong-hui

Spain
0
St. Martiner Street Sports Hall
20 February 1990

Austria
5

		Result
1	Leonor Gallardo	1 – 2	Sabine Aberer
2	Aída Rodríguez	1 – 2	Brigitte Lackner
3	Dolores Marco	0 – 2	Sigrun Ploner
4	Leonor Gallardo; Aída Rodríguez	1 – 2	Brigitte Lackner; Manuela Lassinger
5	Cristina González; Dolores Marco	0 – 2	Sabine Aberer; Sigrun Ploner

United States
5
St. Martiner Street Sports Hall
20 February 1990

North Korea
0

		Result
1	Linda Safarik-Tong	2 – 1 (6–11, 11–7, 12–9)	Pak Sun-bok
2	Jenny Chan	2 – 0 (11–9, 11–8)	Ra Son-hui
3	Joy Kitzmiller	2 – 0 (11–0, 11–3)	Jong Yong-mi
4	Linda French; Linda Safarik-Tong	2 – 0 (15–4, 18–14)	Kim Myong-sun; Pak Sun-bok
5	Ann French; Joy Kitzmiller	2 – 0 (15–1, 15–12)	Jong Yong-mi; Rim Myong-hui

Spain
0
St. Martiner Street Sports Hall
21 February 1990

North Korea
5

		Result
1	Cristina González	0 – 2	Pak Sun-bok
2	Leonor Gallardo	1 – 2	Ra Son-hui
3	Aída Rodríguez	1 – 2	Rim Myong-hui
4	Leonor Gallardo; Aída Rodríguez	1 – 2	Kim Myong-sun; Pak Sun-bok
5	Cristina González; Dolores Marco	0 – 2	Jong Yong-mi; Rim Myong-hui

Austria
1
St. Martiner Street Sports Hall
21 February 1990

United States
4

		Result
1	Sabine Aberer	2 – 1 (2–11, 11–6, 11–8)	Jenny Chan
2	Brigitte Lackner	0 – 2 (4–11, 10–12)	Joy Kitzmiller
3	Sigrun Ploner	0 – 2 (6–11, 10–12)	Erika von Heiland
4	Brigitte Lackner; Manuela Lassinger	0 – 2 (5–15, 6–15)	Linda French; Linda Safarik-Tong
5	Sabine Aberer; Sigrun Ploner	0 – 2 (12–15, 5–15)	Ann French; Joy Kitzmiller

=== Second round ===
==== Group W ====
Pos	Team	Pld	W	L	MF	MA	MD	Pts	Qualification
1	Sweden	2	2	0	10	0	+10	2	Advance to knockout stage
2	United States	2	1	1	3	7	−4	1	
3	Poland	2	0	2	2	8	−6	0	

Source: New Straits Times

Poland
2
St. Martiner Street Sports Hall
22 February 1990

United States
3

		Result
1	Wioletta Wilk	2 – 0 (11–3, 11–5)	Linda Safarik-Tong
2	Beata Syta	2 – 0 (11–9, 11–9)	Jenny Chan
3	Elżbieta Grzybek	0 – 2 (5–11, 4–11)	Joy Kitzmiller
4	Bożena Haracz; Beata Syta	0 – 2 (6–15, 11–15)	Linda French; Linda Safarik-Tong
5	Elżbieta Grzybek; Wioletta Wilk	0 – 2 (11–15, 8–15)	Ann French; Joy Kitzmiller

Sweden
5
St. Martiner Street Sports Hall
22 February 1990

United States
0

		Result
1	Christine Magnusson	2 – 0 (11–6, 11–7)	Linda Safarik-Tong
2	Catrine Bengtsson	2 – 0 (11–2, 11–2)	Jenny Chan
3	Charlotta Wihlborg	2 – 0 (11–1, 11–3)	Joy Kitzmiller
4	Maria Bengtsson; Christine Magnusson	2 – 0 (15–5, 15–3)	Linda French; Linda Safarik-Tong
5	Catrine Bengtsson; Margit Borg	2 – 0 (15–9, 15–7)	Ann French; Joy Kitzmiller

Sweden
5
St. Martiner Street Sports Hall
23 February 1990

Poland
0

		Result
1	Christine Magnusson	2 – 0 (11–0, 11–1)	Wioletta Wilk
2	Catrine Bengtsson	2 – 0 (11–0, 11–0)	Beata Syta
3	Charlotta Wihlborg	2 – 0 (11–4, 11–2)	Elżbieta Grzybek
4	Maria Bengtsson; Christine Magnusson	2 – 0 (15–3, 15–0)	Bożena Haracz; Beata Syta
5	Catrine Bengtsson; Margit Borg	2 – 0 (15–0, 15–2)	Elżbieta Grzybek; Wioletta Wilk

==== Group X ====
Pos	Team	Pld	W	L	MF	MA	MD	Pts	Qualification
1	Netherlands	2	2	0	8	2	+6	2	Advance to knockout stage
2	Soviet Union	2	1	1	7	3	+4	1	
3	Czechoslovakia	2	0	2	0	10	−10	0	

Source: New Straits Times

Soviet Union
5
St. Martiner Street Sports Hall
22 February 1990

Czechoslovakia
0

		Result
1	Elena Rybkina	2 – 0 (11–5, 11–2)	Adela Šimurková
2	Vlada Chernyavskaya	2 – 0 (11–3, 11–7)	Ludmila Šimáková
3	Irina Serova	2 – 0 (11–1, 11–1)	Veronika Vopálenská
4	Svetlana Beliasova; Irina Serova	2 – 0 (15–5, 15–8)	Ludmila Šimáková; Adela Šimurková
5	Vlada Chernyavskaya; Elena Rybkina	2 – 0 (15–1, 15–3)	Eva Lacinová; Jitka Lacinová

Netherlands
5
St. Martiner Street Sports Hall
22 February 1990

Czechoslovakia
0

		Result
1	Astrid van der Knaap	2 – 0 (11–1, 11–3)	Adela Šimurková
2	Monique Hoogland	2 – 0 (11–1, 11–1)	Ludmila Šimáková
3	Erica van Dijck	2 – 0 (11–9, 11–2)	Veronika Vopálenská
4	Eline Coene; Erica van Dijck	2 – 0 (15–1, 15–2)	Ludmila Šimáková; Adela Šimurková
5	Maaike de Boer; Monique Hoogland	2 – 0 (15–1, 15–2)	Eva Lacinová; Jitka Lacinová

Netherlands
3
St. Martiner Street Sports Hall
23 February 1990

Soviet Union
2

		Result
1	Eline Coene	2 – 0 (11–1, 11–5)	Elena Rybkina
2	Astrid van der Knaap	2 – 0 (12–9, 11–2)	Vlada Chernyavskaya
3	Monique Hoogland	0 – 2 (10–12, 8–11)	Irina Serova
4	Eline Coene; Erica van Dijck	2 – 0 (15–6, 15–5)	Svetlana Beliasova; Irina Serova
5	Maaike de Boer; Monique Hoogland	0 – 2 (11–15, 2–15)	Vlada Chernyavskaya; Elena Rybkina

==== Group Y ====
Pos	Team	Pld	W	L	MF	MA	MD	Pts	Qualification
1	England	2	2	0	9	1	+8	2	Advance to knockout stage
2	West Germany	2	1	1	4	6	−2	1	
3	Canada	2	0	2	2	8	−6	0	

Source: New Straits Times

Canada
2
St. Martiner Street Sports Hall
22 February 1990

West Germany
3

		Result
1	Denyse Julien	0 – 2 (3–11, 3–11)	Katrin Schmidt
2	Doris Piché	2 – 0 (12–10, 11–8)	Kerstin Ubben
3	Heather Ostrom	0 – 2 (9–12, 11–2)	Andrea Findhammer
4	Denyse Julien; Doris Piché	2 – 0 (15–12, 15–11)	Katrin Schmidt; Anne-Katrin Seid
5	Linda Cloutier; Chantal Jobin	1 – 2 (17–16, 12–15, 4–15)	Nicole Baldewein; Kerstin Ubben

England
4
St. Martiner Street Sports Hall
22 February 1990

West Germany
1

		Result
1	Fiona Smith	0 – 2 (10–12, 10–12)	Katrin Schmidt
2	Joanne Muggeridge	2 – 0 (11–4, 11–3)	Christine Skropke
3	Suzanne Louis	2 – 0 (11–0, 11–2)	Andrea Findhammer
4	Gillian Clark; Gillian Gowers	2 – 1 (15–10, 14–17, 15–6)	Katrin Schmidt; Anne-Katrin Seid
5	Karen Chapman; Julie Munday	2 – 0 (15–4, 15–8)	Nicole Baldewein; Kerstin Ubben

England
5
St. Martiner Street Sports Hall
23 February 1990

Canada
0

		Result
1	Fiona Smith	2 – 0	Denyse Julien
2	Joanne Muggeridge	2 – 0	Doris Piché
3	Suzanne Louis	2 – 0	Heather Ostrom
4	Gillian Clark; Gillian Gowers	2 – 1	Denyse Julien; Doris Piché
5	Karen Chapman; Julie Munday	2 – 0	Linda Cloutier; Chantal Jobin

==== Group Z ====
Pos	Team	Pld	W	L	MF	MA	MD	Pts	Qualification
1	Denmark	2	2	0	10	0	+10	2	Advance to knockout stage
2	Scotland	2	1	1	3	7	−4	1	
3	Bulgaria	2	0	2	2	8	−6	0	

Source: New Straits Times

Scotland
3
St. Martiner Street Sports Hall
22 February 1990

Bulgaria
2

		Result
1	Gillian Martin	1 – 2	Diana Koleva
2	Anne Gibson	2 – 0	Diana Filipova
3	Elinor Allen	2 – 0	Emilia Dimitrova
4	Elinor Allen; Jennifer Allen	2 – 0	Diana Koleva; Diana Filipova
5	Alison Fulton; Pamela Wyatt	1 – 2	Emilia Dimitrova; Neli Nedyalkova

Denmark
5
St. Martiner Street Sports Hall
22 February 1990

Bulgaria
0

		Result
1	Kirsten Larsen	2 – 0	Diana Koleva
2	Pernille Nedergaard	2 – 0	Diana Filipova
3	Charlotte Hattens	2 – 0	Emilia Dimitrova
4	Dorte Kjær; Nettie Nielsen	2 – 0	Diana Koleva; Diana Filipova
5	Lotte Olsen; Gitte Paulsen	2 – 0	Emilia Dimitrova; Neli Nedyalkova

Denmark
5
St. Martiner Street Sports Hall
23 February 1990

Scotland
0

		Result
1	Kirsten Larsen	2 – 0	Gillian Martin
2	Pernille Nedergaard	2 – 1	Anne Gibson
3	Charlotte Hattens	2 – 1	Elinor Allen
4	Dorte Kjær; Nettie Nielsen	2 – 0	Elinor Allen; Jennifer Allen
5	Lotte Olsen; Gitte Paulsen	2 – 0	Alison Fulton; Pamela Wyatt

=== Knockout stage ===
Semi-finals
Sweden	3
Netherlands	2
England	1
Denmark	4

Final
Sweden	2
Denmark	3
Third place
Netherlands	2
England	3

==== Semi-finals ====
Sweden
3
St. Martiner Street Sports Hall
24 February 1990

Netherlands
2

		Result
1	Christine Magnusson	0 – 2 (10–12, 9–12)	Eline Coene
2	Catrine Bengtsson	2 – 1 (11–7, 5–11, 12–11)	Astrid van der Knaap
3	Charlotta Wihlborg	2 – 0 (11–8, 11–6)	Erica van Dijck
4	Maria Bengtsson; Christine Magnusson	2 – 0 (15–2, 15–11)	Eline Coene; Erica van Dijck
5	Catrine Bengtsson; Margit Borg	0 – 2 (17–18, 9–15)	Maaike de Boer; Monique Hoogland

Denmark
4
St. Martiner Street Sports Hall
24 February 1990

England
1

		Result
1	Kirsten Larsen	2 – 0 (11–7, 11–3)	Fiona Smith
2	Pernille Nedergaard	2 – 0 (11–2, 12–10)	Joanne Muggeridge
3	Charlotte Hattens	1 – 2 (11–7, 6–11, 6–11)	Suzanne Louis
4	Dorte Kjær; Nettie Nielsen	2 – 0 (15–7, 15–11)	Gillian Clark; Gillian Gowers
5	Lotte Olsen; Gitte Paulsen	2 – 0 (15–7, 15–9)	Julie Munday; Fiona Smith

==== Third place ====
England
2
St. Martiner Street Sports Hall
25 February 1990

Netherlands
3

		Result
1	Fiona Smith	1 – 2 (12–10, 9–12, 5–11)	Eline Coene
2	Joanne Muggeridge	1 – 2 (4–11, 11–3, 10–12)	Astrid van der Knaap
3	Suzanne Louis	2 – 0 (11–6, 11–2)	Monique Hoogland
4	Gillian Clark; Gillian Gowers	2 – 0 (15–8, 15–11)	Eline Coene; Erica van Dijck
5	Karen Chapman; Julie Munday	0 – 2 (15–18, 8–15)	Maaike de Boer; Monique Hoogland

==== Final ====
Denmark
3
St. Martiner Street Sports Hall
25 February 1990

Sweden
2

		Result
1	Kirsten Larsen	2 – 0 (11–4, 11–6)	Christine Magnusson
2	Pernille Nedergaard	2 – 0 (11–5, 11–7)	Catrine Bengtsson
3	Charlotte Hattens	0 – 2 (7–11, 1–11)	Charlotta Wihlborg
4	Dorte Kjær; Nettie Nielsen	2 – 1 (15–8, 11–15, 15–6)	Catrine Bengtsson; Maria Bengtsson
5	Lotte Olsen; Gitte Paulsen	0 – 2 (8–15, 7–15)	Margit Borg; Christine Magnusson
