= 1991 IBF World Championships – Women's doubles =

Badminton championships

Women's doubles at the 1991 IBF World Championships
- Venue: Brøndby Arena
- Location: Copenhagen, Denmark
- Dates: May 2, 1991 – May 8, 1991

Medalists
gold medal	Guan Weizhen; Nong Qunhua	China
silver medal	Christine Magnusson; Maria Bengtsson	Sweden
bronze medal	Shim Eun-jung; Gil Young-ah	South Korea
bronze medal	Hwang Hye-young; Chung So-young	South Korea

The 1991 IBF World Championships (World Badminton Championships) were held in Copenhagen, Denmark, in 1991. Following the results of the women's doubles.

== Qualification ==
- (Netherlands) Sonja Mellink / Nicole van Hooren - (Spain) Cristina González / Dolores Marco: 15–3, 15–4
- (Japan) Tomomi Matsuo / Kyoko Sasage - (Hong Kong) Cheng Yin Sat / Wong Chun Fan: 15–4, 15–1
- (Chinese Taipei) Chen Hsiao-Li / Shyu Yu-Ling - (North Korea) Kim Myong Sun / Kim Song Ok: 15–7, 15–3
- (Malaysia) Tan Lee Wai / Tan Sui Hoon - (Hong Kong) Chiu Mei Yin / Chung Hoi Yuk: 15–3, 15–12
- (Indonesia) Catherine / Eliza Nathanael - (Switzerland) Silvia Albrecht / (Australia) Lisa Campbell: 15–7, 15–3
- (New Zealand) Tammy Jenkins / Rhona Robertson - (France) Sandra Dimbour / Elodie Mansuy: 15–9, 15–11
- (Chinese Taipei) Kang Chia-I / Lee Chien-Mei - (Grenada) Rachel Bain / Christine Charles: w.o.

== Main stage ==
=== Section 1 ===
First round
(China) Guan Weizhen (China) Nong Qunhua	15	15
(Scotland) Sonya McGinn (Republic of Ireland) Jayne Plunkett	0	1
(New Zealand) Sheree Jefferson (New Zealand) Julie Still	15	15
(Poland) Monika Lipinska (Poland) Sylwia Rutkiewicz	8	8
(Japan) Tomomi Matsuo (Japan) Kyoko Sasage	15	15
(India) Madhumita Bisht (India) Manjusha Kanwar	1	9
(England) Julie Bradbury (England) Cheryl Johnson	15	15
(United States) Linda French (United States) Joy Kitzmiller	7	3
(Indonesia) Finarsih (Indonesia) Lili Tampi	15	15
(Switzerland) Valentine Ayer (Switzerland) Bettina Gfeller	3	4
(Denmark) Dorte Kjaer (Denmark) Lotte Olsen	15	17
(Canada) Denyse Julien (Canada) Doris Piché	7	14
(Malaysia) Lee Wai Leng (Malaysia) Lim Siew Choon	15	15
(Finland) Susanna Kauhanen (Finland) Annika Nyström	6	4
(Chinese Taipei) Chen Hsiao-Li (Chinese Taipei) Shyu Yu-Ling	15	15
(France) Virginie Delvingt (France) Christelle Mol	6	10

Second round
(China) Guan Weizhen (China) Nong Qunhua	15	15
(New Zealand) Sheree Jefferson (New Zealand) Julie Still	1	0
(Japan) Tomomi Matsuo (Japan) Kyoko Sasage	15	15
(England) Julie Bradbury (England) Cheryl Johnson	6	6
(Indonesia) Finarsih (Indonesia) Lili Tampi	9	15	18
(Denmark) Dorte Kjaer (Denmark) Lotte Olsen	15	5	13
(Malaysia) Lee Wai Leng (Malaysia) Lim Siew Choon	17	15
(Chinese Taipei) Chen Hsiao-Li (Chinese Taipei) Shyu Yu-Ling	14	6

Third round
(China) Guan Weizhen (China) Nong Qunhua	15	15
(Japan) Tomomi Matsuo (Japan) Kyoko Sasage	6	7
(Indonesia) Finarsih (Indonesia) Lili Tampi	17	15
(Malaysia) Lee Wai Leng (Malaysia) Lim Siew Choon	15	1

Quarterfinals
(China) Guan Weizhen (China) Nong Qunhua	18	15
(Indonesia) Finarsih (Indonesia) Lili Tampi	14	4

=== Section 2 ===
First round
(South Korea) Hwang Hye-young (South Korea) Chung So-young	15	15
(Thailand) Ladawan Mulasartsathorn (Thailand) Piyathip Sansaniyakulvilai	6	7
(Bulgaria) Neli Boteva (Bulgaria) Emilia Dimitrova	15	13	15
(Austria) Sabine Aberer (Austria) Brigitte Langthaler	11	15	9
(China) Pan Li (China) Wu Yuhong	15	15
(Iceland) Elsa Nielsen (Iceland) Asa Palsdottir	1	1
(Sweden) Margit Borg (Sweden) Charlotta Wihlborg	w.o.
(Nigeria) Bridget Ibenero (Nigeria) Bisi Tiamiyu
(England) Gillian Clark (Denmark) Nettie Nielsen	15	15
(Germany) Katrin Schmidt (Germany) Kerstin Ubben	11	3
(Finland) Nina Koho (Finland) Sara Ussher	w.o.
(Russia) Natalja Ivanova (Russia) Viktoria Pron-Evtousenko
(Netherlands) Sonja Mellink (Netherlands) Nicole van Hooren	15	18
(Norway) Gry Kirsti Skjonhaug (Norway) Camilla Wright	6	13
(Scotland) Elinor Middlemiss (Scotland) Jennifer Williamson	15	15
(Spain) Esther Sanz (Italy) Erika Henriete Stich	2	1

Second round
(South Korea) Hwang Hye-young (South Korea) Chung So-young	15	15
(Bulgaria) Neli Boteva (Bulgaria) Emilia Dimitrova	1	1
(China) Pan Li (China) Wu Yuhong	15	15
(Sweden) Margit Borg (Sweden) Charlotta Wihlborg	2	2
(England) Gillian Clark (Denmark) Nettie Nielsen	15	15
(Finland) Nina Koho (Finland) Sara Ussher	4	2
(Netherlands) Sonja Mellink (Netherlands) Nicole van Hooren	15	15
(Scotland) Elinor Middlemiss (Scotland) Jennifer Williamson	5	9

Third round
(South Korea) Hwang Hye-young (South Korea) Chung So-young	15	18
(China) Pan Li (China) Wu Yuhong	7	15
(England) Gillian Clark (Denmark) Nettie Nielsen	15	15
(Netherlands) Sonja Mellink (Netherlands) Nicole van Hooren	1	5

Quarterfinals
12	(South Korea) Hwang Hye-young (South Korea) Chung So-young	15	15
(England) Gillian Clark (Denmark) Nettie Nielsen	15	4	5

=== Section 3 ===
First round
(Sweden) Christine Magnusson (Sweden) Maria Bengtsson	15	15
(Australia) Rhonda Cator (Australia) Anna Oi Chan Lao	6	8
(Poland) Bozena Bak (Poland) Wioletta Sosnowska	w.o.
(Pakistan) Afshan Shakeel (Pakistan) Ghazala Wadood
(Malaysia) Tan Lee Wai (Malaysia) Tan Sui Hoon	15	15
(Canada) Marie-Helene Loranger (Canada) Heather Poole	4	7
(Cyprus) Diana Knekna (Bulgaria) Diana Koleva	15	15
(Republic of Ireland) Ciara Doheny (United States) Erika von Heiland	11	5
(China) Lai Caiqin (China) Yao Fen	15	15
(Russia) Elena Rybkhina (Russia) Vlada Tcherniavskaia	3	13
(England) Gillian Gowers (England) Sara Sankey	15	15
(Mauritius) Martine de Souza (Mauritius) Vandanah Seesurun	4	0
(Japan) Tokiko Hirota (Japan) Yuko Koike	15	15
(Scotland) Anne Gibson (Scotland) Gillian Martin	3	6
(Indonesia) Catherine (Indonesia) Eliza Nathanael	15	15
(Hungary) Andrea Harsagi (Austria) Gabriele Kumpfmüller	3	5

Second round
(Sweden) Christine Magnusson (Sweden) Maria Bengtsson	15	15
(Poland) Bozena Bak (Poland) Wioletta Sosnowska	2	7
(Malaysia) Tan Lee Wai (Malaysia) Tan Sui Hoon	15	15
(Cyprus) Diana Knekna (Bulgaria) Diana Koleva	6	8
(China) Lai Caiqin (China) Yao Fen	18	15
(England) Gillian Gowers (England) Sara Sankey	15	6
(Japan) Tokiko Hirota (Japan) Yuko Koike	15	15
(Indonesia) Catherine (Indonesia) Eliza Nathanael	8	7

Third round
(Sweden) Christine Magnusson (Sweden) Maria Bengtsson	15	15
(Malaysia) Tan Lee Wai (Malaysia) Tan Sui Hoon	6	11
(China) Lai Caiqin (China) Yao Fen	15	13	15
(Japan) Tokiko Hirota (Japan) Yuko Koike	9	15	11

Quarterfinals
(Sweden) Christine Magnusson (Sweden) Maria Bengtsson	15	1	15
(China) Lai Caiqin (China) Yao Fen	11	15	9

=== Section 4 ===
First round
(South Korea) Shim Eun-jung (South Korea) Gil Young-ah	15	15
(New Zealand) Tammy Jenkins (New Zealand) Rhona Robertson	5	6
(Germany) Andrea Findhammer (Germany) Anne-Katrin Seid	15	15
(United States) Liz Aronsohn (United States) Jenny Chan	9	2
(Indonesia) Erma Sulistyaningsih (Indonesia) Rosiana Tendean	15	15
(Malta) Shirley Cefai (Malta) Catherine Dimech	1	1
(Canada) Si-An Deng (Canada) Claire Sharpe	15	15
(Poland) Bozena Haracz (Poland) Beata Syta	4	8
(Japan) Kimiko Jinnai (Japan) Hisako Mori	15	15
(Mexico) Ana Laura de la Torre (Mexico) Maria de la Paz	1	1
(Czech Republic) Ludmila Basova (Czech Republic) Jitka Lacinová	w.o.
(Nigeria) Obiageli Olorunsola (Nigeria) Dayo Oyewusi
(Netherlands) Eline Coene (Netherlands) Erica van den Heuvel	17	15
(Finland) Christina von Pfaler (Finland) Ulrica von Pfaler	4	2
(Chinese Taipei) Kang Chia-I (Chinese Taipei) Lee Chien-Mei	4	15	15
(Denmark) Pernille Dupont (Denmark) Grete Mogensen	15	12	11

Second round
(South Korea) Shim Eun-jung (South Korea) Gil Young-ah	15	15
(Germany) Andrea Findhammer (Germany) Anne-Katrin Seid	4	3
(Indonesia) Erma Sulistyaningsih (Indonesia) Rosiana Tendean	17	15
(Canada) Si-An Deng (Canada) Claire Sharpe	16	9
(Japan) Kimiko Jinnai (Japan) Hisako Mori	15	15
(Czech Republic) Ludmila Basova (Czech Republic) Jitka Lacinová	4	2
(Netherlands) Eline Coene (Netherlands) Erica van den Heuvel	15	15
(Chinese Taipei) Kang Chia-I (Chinese Taipei) Lee Chien-Mei	7	5

Third round
(South Korea) Shim Eun-jung (South Korea) Gil Young-ah	15	15
(Indonesia) Erma Sulistyaningsih (Indonesia) Rosiana Tendean	6	9
(Japan) Kimiko Jinnai (Japan) Hisako Mori	15	15
(Netherlands) Eline Coene (Netherlands) Erica van den Heuvel	7	5

Quarterfinals
(South Korea) Shim Eun-jung (South Korea) Gil Young-ah	6	15	15
(Japan) Kimiko Jinnai (Japan) Hisako Mori	15	12	11

== Final stage ==
Quarterfinals
(China) Guan Weizhen (China) Nong Qunhua	18	15
(Indonesia) Finarsih (Indonesia) Lili Tampi	14	4
(South Korea) Hwang Hye-young (South Korea) Chung So-young	12	15	15
(England) Gillian Clark (Denmark) Nettie Nielsen	15	4	5
(Sweden) Christine Magnusson (Sweden) Maria Bengtsson	15	1	15
(China) Lai Caiqin (China) Yao Fen	11	15	9
(South Korea) Shim Eun-jung (South Korea) Gil Young-ah	6	15	15
(Japan) Kimiko Jinnai (Japan) Hisako Mori	15	12	11

Semifinals
(China) Guan Weizhen (China) Nong Qunhua	15	15
(South Korea) Hwang Hye-young (South Korea) Chung So-young	7	8
(Sweden) Christine Magnusson (Sweden) Maria Bengtsson	8	15	15
(South Korea) Shim Eun-jung (South Korea) Gil Young-ah	15	8	5

Finals
(China) Guan Weizhen (China) Nong Qunhua	15	15
(Sweden) Christine Magnusson (Sweden) Maria Bengtsson	7	4
