= 1995 IBF World Championships – Women's doubles =

Women's doubles at the 1995 IBF World Championships
- Venue: Malley Sports Centre
- Location: Lausanne, Switzerland
- Dates: May 22, 1995 – May 28, 1995

Medalists
gold medal	Gil Young-ah; Jang Hye-ock	South Korea
silver medal	Finarsih; Lili Tampi	Indonesia
bronze medal	Qin Yiyuan; Tang Yongshu	China
bronze medal	Helene Kirkegaard; Rikke Olsen	Denmark

The 9th IBF World Championships (World Badminton Championships) were held in Lausanne, Switzerland, between 22 May and 28 May 1995. Following are the results of the women's doubles.

== Main stage ==
=== Section 1 ===
First round
(South Korea) Gil Young-ah (South Korea) Jang Hye-ock	15	15
(Russia) Natalia Djackova (Russia) Ella Karachkova	1	2
(Germany) Karen Neumann (Germany) Nicole Baldewein	15	15
(Canada) Heather Poole (Canada) Charmaine Reid	6	11
(Japan) Hisako Mizui (Japan) Yasuko Mizui	15	15
(France) Virginie Delvingt (France) Sandrine Lefevre	0	5
(Switzerland) Silvia Albrecht (Switzerland) Santi Wibowo	15	15
(New Zealand) Nicole Harwood (New Zealand) Julie Still	4	0
(China) Ge Fei (China) Gu Jun	15	15
(Switzerland) Valentine Ayer (Switzerland) Bettina Gfeller	3	4
(England) Gillian Gowers (England) Joanne Muggeridge	w.o.
(Czech Republic) Jitka Lacinová (Czech Republic) Eva Lacinová
(Denmark) Ann Jørgensen (Denmark) Lotte Olsen	15	15
(Scotland) Jillian Haldane (Scotland) Gillian Martin	3	13
(Malaysia) Seok Choon Kuak (Malaysia) Zamaliah Sidek	15	15
(Argentina) Alice Garay (Argentina) Marion Meyer	0	2

Second round
(South Korea) Gil Young-ah (South Korea) Jang Hye-ock	15	15
(Germany) Karen Neumann (Germany) Nicole Baldewein	5	7
(Japan) Hisako Mizui (Japan) Yasuko Mizui	15	4	15
(Switzerland) Silvia Albrecht (Switzerland) Santi Wibowo	12	15	8
(China) Ge Fei (China) Gu Jun	15	15
(England) Gillian Gowers (England) Joanne Muggeridge	11	4
(Denmark) Ann Jørgensen (Denmark) Lotte Olsen	15	15
(Malaysia) Seok Choon Kuak (Malaysia) Zamaliah Sidek	5	9

Third round
(South Korea) Gil Young-ah (South Korea) Jang Hye-ock	15	15
(Japan) Hisako Mizui (Japan) Yasuko Mizui	1	5
(China) Ge Fei (China) Gu Jun	15	15
(Denmark) Ann Jørgensen (Denmark) Lotte Olsen	8	9

Quarterfinals
(South Korea) Gil Young-ah (South Korea) Jang Hye-ock	15	11	15
(China) Ge Fei (China) Gu Jun	12	15	11

=== Section 2 ===
First round
(China) Qin Yiyuan (China) Tang Yongshu	15	15
(Hungary) Andrea Dako (Hungary) Adrienn Kocsis	1	6
(Japan) Miwa Kai (Japan) Haruko Matsuda	15	15
(Germany) Sandra Beißel (Germany) Nicole Grether	8	11
(Indonesia) Eliza Nathanael (Indonesia) Zelin Resiana	15	15
(Canada) Milaine Cloutier (Canada) Robbyn Hermitage	6	11
(Chinese Taipei) Ko Hsin-Lin (Chinese Taipei) Lee Ming-Hwa	15	15
(Spain) Dolores Marco (Spain) Esther Sanz	10	4
(Denmark) Lisbet Stuer-Lauridsen (Denmark) Marlene Thomsen	15	15
(Sweden) Maria Bengtsson (Sweden) Margit Borg	11	6
(Bulgaria) Neli Boteva (Bulgaria) Diana Koleva	w.o.
(Morocco) Rachida Ait Lamarani (Morocco) Fatima Nassim
(England) Julie Bradbury (England) Joanne Goode	15	15
(Australia) Rhonda Cator (Australia) Amanda Hardy	5	1
(Russia) Nadezhda Chervyakova (Russia) Irina Yakusheva	15	15
(Peru) Ximena Bellido (Trinidad and Tobago) Debra O'Connor	3	7

Second round
(China) Qin Yiyuan (China) Tang Yongshu	15	15
(Japan) Miwa Kai (Japan) Haruko Matsuda	1	6
(Indonesia) Eliza Nathanael (Indonesia) Zelin Resiana	15	15
(Chinese Taipei) Ko Hsin-Lin (Chinese Taipei) Lee Ming-Hwa	8	8
(Denmark) Lisbet Stuer-Lauridsen (Denmark) Marlene Thomsen	15	15
(Bulgaria) Neli Boteva (Bulgaria) Diana Koleva	5	4
(England) Julie Bradbury (England) Joanne Goode	15	15
(Russia) Nadezhda Chervyakova (Russia) Irina Yakusheva	7	8

Third round
(China) Qin Yiyuan (China) Tang Yongshu	15	15
(Indonesia) Eliza Nathanael (Indonesia) Zelin Resiana	9	10
(Denmark) Lisbet Stuer-Lauridsen (Denmark) Marlene Thomsen	15	12	15
(England) Julie Bradbury (England) Joanne Goode	7	15	9

Quarterfinals
(China) Qin Yiyuan (China) Tang Yongshu	15	18
(Denmark) Lisbet Stuer-Lauridsen (Denmark) Marlene Thomsen	12	16

=== Section 3 ===
First round
(Indonesia) Finarsih (Indonesia) Lili Tampi	15	15
(Belarus) Tatiana Gerassimovitch (Belarus) Vlada Tchernyavskaya	2	5
(Ukraine) Natalja Esipenko (Ukraine) Irina Koloskova	15	15
(Bulgaria) Emilia Dimitrova (Bulgaria) Dobrinka Smilianova	12	8
(Netherlands) Brenda Beenhakker (Netherlands) Carolien Glebbeek	17	15
(Mauritius) Martine de Souza (Mauritius) Vandanah Seesurun	16	8
(Hong Kong) Chan Oi Ni (Hong Kong) Tung Chau Man	15	15
(Hungary) Andrea Harsagi (Hungary) Andrea Odor	1	4
(China) Peng Xinyong (China) Zhang Jin	15	15
(Switzerland) Judith Baumeyer (Switzerland) Yvonne Naef	2	7
(Scotland) Elinor Middlemiss (Scotland) Jennifer Williamson	w.o.
(Cyprus) Christina Christofia (Cyprus) Maria Iasonos
(Chinese Taipei) Chen Li-Chin (Chinese Taipei) Tsai Hui-Min	15	15
(South Korea) Chung Jae-hee (South Korea) Park Soo-yun	11	3
(Canada) Si-An Deng (Canada) Denyse Julien	15	15
(Peru) Lorena Blanco (Peru) Silvia Jimenez	4	6

Second round
(Indonesia) Finarsih (Indonesia) Lili Tampi	15	15
(Ukraine) Natalja Esipenko (Ukraine) Irina Koloskova	2	2
(Netherlands) Brenda Beenhakker (Netherlands) Carolien Glebbeek	18	16	15
(Hong Kong) Chan Oi Ni (Hong Kong) Tung Chau Man	13	17	9
(China) Peng Xinyong (China) Zhang Jin	18	15
(Scotland) Elinor Middlemiss (Scotland) Jennifer Williamson	13	7
(Chinese Taipei) Chen Li-Chin (Chinese Taipei) Tsai Hui-Min	15	14	15
(Canada) Si-An Deng (Canada) Denyse Julien	8	17	8

Third round
(Indonesia) Finarsih (Indonesia) Lili Tampi	15	15
(Netherlands) Brenda Beenhakker (Netherlands) Carolien Glebbeek	2	6
(China) Peng Xinyong (China) Zhang Jin	12	15	15
(Chinese Taipei) Chen Li-Chin (Chinese Taipei) Tsai Hui-Min	15	13	4

Quarterfinals
(Indonesia) Finarsih (Indonesia) Lili Tampi	15	15
(China) Peng Xinyong (China) Zhang Jin	12	6

=== Section 4 ===
First round
(Denmark) Helene Kirkegaard (Denmark) Rikke Olsen	15	15
(France) Christelle Mol (France) Tatiana Vattier	3	2
(Russia) Elena Rybkina (Russia) Marina Yakusheva	w.o.
(Slovakia) Alexandra Felgrova (Slovakia) Zuzana Kenizova
(Japan) Tomomi Matsuo (Japan) Masako Sakamoto	15	15
(Bulgaria) Victoria Hristova (Bulgaria) Rayna Tzvetkova	1	0
(Kazakhstan) Irina Gritsenko (Kazakhstan) Ludmila Okuneva	15	15
(Italy) Monica Memoli (Italy) Maria Luisa Mur	12	4
(Germany) Katrin Schmidt (Germany) Kerstin Ubben	15	15
(India) Seema Bafna (India) Sindhu Gulati	4	5
(Thailand) Plernta Boonyarit (Thailand) Pornsawan Plungwech	w.o.
(Malta) Catherine Dimech (Malta) Joanne Grech
(South Korea) Kim Mee-hyang (South Korea) Kim Shin-young	15	15
(Iceland) Gudrun Juliusdottir (Finland) Anu Weckström	2	1
(England) Nichola Beck (England) Joanne Davies	15	15
(Finland) Nina Sarnesto (Finland) Malin Virta	3	6

Second round
(Denmark) Helene Kirkegaard (Denmark) Rikke Olsen	15	4	15
(Russia) Elena Rybkina (Russia) Marina Yakusheva	3	15	6
(Japan) Tomomi Matsuo (Japan) Masako Sakamoto	15	15
(Kazakhstan) Irina Gritsenko (Kazakhstan) Ludmila Okuneva	1	8
(Germany) Katrin Schmidt (Germany) Kerstin Ubben	15	15
(Thailand) Plernta Boonyarit (Thailand) Pornsawan Plungwech	11	6
(South Korea) Kim Mee-hyang (South Korea) Kim Shin-young	15	15
(England) Nichola Beck (England) Joanne Davies	6	6

Third round
(Denmark) Helene Kirkegaard (Denmark) Rikke Olsen	18	15
(Japan) Tomomi Matsuo (Japan) Masako Sakamoto	15	8
(Germany) Katrin Schmidt (Germany) Kerstin Ubben	15	6	17
(South Korea) Kim Mee-hyang (South Korea) Kim Shin-young	7	15	15

Quarterfinals
(Denmark) Helene Kirkegaard (Denmark) Rikke Olsen	15	15
(Germany) Katrin Schmidt (Germany) Kerstin Ubben	11	5

== Final stage ==
Quarterfinals
(South Korea) Gil Young-ah (South Korea) Jang Hye-ock	15	11	15
(China) Ge Fei (China) Gu Jun	12	15	11
(China) Qin Yiyuan (China) Tang Yongshu	15	18
(Denmark) Lisbet Stuer-Lauridsen (Denmark) Marlene Thomsen	12	16
(Indonesia) Finarsih (Indonesia) Lili Tampi	15	15
(China) Peng Xinyong (China) Zhang Jin	12	6
(Denmark) Helene Kirkegaard (Denmark) Rikke Olsen	15	15
(Germany) Katrin Schmidt (Germany) Kerstin Ubben	11	5

Semifinals
(South Korea) Gil Young-ah (South Korea) Jang Hye-ock	15	15
(China) Qin Yiyuan (China) Tang Yongshu	8	6
(Indonesia) Finarsih (Indonesia) Lili Tampi	15	17
(Denmark) Helene Kirkegaard (Denmark) Rikke Olsen	8	16

Finals
(South Korea) Gil Young-ah (South Korea) Jang Hye-ock	3	15	15
(Indonesia) Finarsih (Indonesia) Lili Tampi	15	11	10
