= Australian Open (badminton) =

Annual badminton tournament in Australia

- Official website
- Founded: 1989; 37 years ago
- Editions: 35th (2026)
- Location: Sydney (2026); Australia
- Venue: State Sports Centre (2026)
- Prize money: US$500,000 (2026)

Men's
- Draw: 32S / 32D
- Current champions: Alwi Farhan (singles); Chen Boyang; Liu Yi (doubles)
- Most singles titles: 2 Tim He; Rio Suryana; Andrew Smith
- Most doubles titles: 6 Peter Blackburn

Women's
- Draw: 32S / 32D
- Current champions: Akane Yamaguchi (singles); Jia Yifan; Zhang Shuxian (doubles)
- Most singles titles: 3 Lisa Campbell
- Most doubles titles: 4 Rhonda Cator; Amanda Hardy

Mixed doubles
- Draw: 32
- Current champions: Feng Yanzhe; Huang Dongping
- Most titles (male): 3 Tim He; Daniel Shirley
- Most titles (female): 3 Anna Lao; Amanda Hardy; Huang Dongping

Super 500
- Arctic Open; Australian Open; Hong Kong Open; Hylo Open; Indonesia Masters; Japan Masters; Korea Open; Malaysia Masters; Thailand Open

Last completed
- 2026 Australian Open

The Australian Open is an international badminton tournament held in Australia. It was upgraded to a Grand Prix Gold event in 2011, and between 2014 and 2017 it was part of the Super Series. From 2018 to 2022, it was classified as a Super 300 event on the BWF World Tour. Since 2023, the tournament has been elevated to Super 500 status.

== History of host cities ==
City	Years host
Melbourne	2009–2011
Sydney	2012–2019, 2022–2026

Locations of Australian Open host cities

== Previous winners ==
Year	Men's singles	Women's singles	Men's doubles	Women's doubles	Mixed doubles
1989	(Australia) Sze Yu	(Australia) Anna Lao	(Australia) Peter Blackburn (Australia) Gordon Lang	(Australia) Anna Lao (Australia) Teresa Lian	(Hong Kong) Tim He (Australia) Anna Lao
1990	(Indonesia) Ardy Wiranata	(Indonesia) Susi Susanti	(Malaysia) Jalani Sidek (Malaysia) Razif Sidek	(Australia) Rhonda Cator (Australia) Anna Lao	(Hong Kong) Tim He (Australia) Anna Lao
1991	(Hong Kong) Tim He	(Australia) Anna Lao	(Hong Kong) Chan Siu Kwong (Hong Kong) Ng Pak Kum	(Australia) Rhonda Cator (Australia) Anna Lao	(Hong Kong) Tim He (Australia) Anna Lao
1992	(Indonesia) Eddy Kurniawan	(Australia) Song Yang	(Australia) Peter Blackburn (Australia) Mark Nichols	(Australia) Lisa Campbell (Australia) Amanda Hardy	(Australia) Ong Beng Teong (Australia) Wendy Shinners
1993	(Hong Kong) Tim He	(Australia) Song Yang	(Australia) Peter Blackburn (Australia) Mark Nichols	(Australia) Lisa Campbell (Australia) Amanda Hardy	(Australia) Mark Nichols (Australia) Amanda Hardy
1994	(Indonesia) Jefry Tjoandi	(Australia) Lisa Campbell	(Australia) Peter Blackburn (Australia) Mark Nichols	(Australia) Wendy Shinners (Australia) Song Yang	(Australia) Mark Nichols (Australia) Amanda Hardy
1995	(Australia) Paul Stevenson	(Australia) Lisa Campbell	(Australia) Peter Blackburn (Australia) Paul Staight	(Australia) Rhonda Cator (Australia) Amanda Hardy	(Australia) Paul Stevenson (Australia) Amanda Hardy
1996	(Hong Kong) Tam Kai Chuen	(Australia) Lisa Campbell	(Hong Kong) Chow Kin Man (Hong Kong) Ma Che Kong	(Philippines) Kennie Asuncion (Philippines) Amparo Lim	(Australia) Peter Blackburn (Australia) Rhonda Cator
1997	(Hong Kong) Ng Wei	(New Zealand) Li Feng	(Australia) David Bamford (Australia) Peter Blackburn	(New Zealand) Tammy Jenkins (New Zealand) Rhona Robertson	(Australia) Murray Hocking (Australia) Lisa Campbell
1998	(Indonesia) Rio Suryana	(Australia) Michaela Smith	(Australia) David Bamford (Australia) Peter Blackburn	(Australia) Rhonda Cator (Australia) Amanda Hardy	(Australia) Peter Blackburn (Australia) Rhonda Cator
1999	(Australia) Rio Suryana	(France) Sandra Dimbour	(South Korea) Kim Dong-moon (South Korea) Yoo Yong-sung	(South Korea) Lee Hyo-jung (South Korea) Ra Kyung-min	(Germany) Michael Keck (Netherlands) Erica van den Heuvel
2000	No competition				
2001	(England) Colin Haughton	(Australia) Lenny Permana	(Australia) Ashley Brehaut (Australia) Travis Denney	(New Zealand) Tammy Jenkins (New Zealand) Rhona Robertson	(New Zealand) Daniel Shirley (New Zealand) Sara Petersen
2002	(Malaysia) Sairul Amar Ayob	(Australia) Lenny Permana	(Malaysia) Jeremy Gan (Malaysia) Ng Kean Kok	(New Zealand) Sara Petersen (New Zealand) Bei Wu	(New Zealand) Daniel Shirley (New Zealand) Sara Petersen
2003	(Japan) Shoji Sato	(Japan) Chie Umezu	(Hong Kong) Liu Kwok Wa (Hong Kong) Albertus Susanto Njoto	(Japan) Ai Hirayama (Japan) Akiko Nakashima	(Malaysia) Ng Kean Kok (Malaysia) Chor Hooi Yee
2004	(England) Andrew Smith	(Chinese Taipei) Huang Chia-chi	(Australia) Boyd Cooper (Australia) Travis Denney	(Australia) Renuga Veeran (Australia) Susan Wang	(Australia) Travis Denny (Australia) Kellie Lucas
2005	(England) Andrew Smith	(Germany) Petra Overzier	(Australia) Boyd Cooper (Australia) Travis Denney	(Australia) Kellie Lucas (Australia) Kate Wilson-Smith	(Australia) Travis Denney (Australia) Kate Wilson-Smith
2006	(Malaysia) Ismail Saman	(Australia) Huang Chia-chi	(New Zealand) John Gordon (New Zealand) Daniel Shirley	(Indonesia) Rintan Apriliana (Japan) Yukina Imura	(New Zealand) Daniel Shirley (Malaysia) Joanne Quay
2007	(New Zealand) John Moody	(Japan) Kanako Yonekura	(Australia) Ashley Brehaut (Indonesia) Aji Basuki Sindoro	(Japan) Ikue Tatani (Japan) Aya Wakisaka	(New Zealand) Craig Cooper (New Zealand) Renee Flavell
2008	(Malaysia) Lee Tsuen Seng	(Japan) Mizuki Fujii	(South Korea) Choi Sang-won (South Korea) Kim Sa-rang	(Japan) Yasuyo Imabeppu (Japan) Shizuka Matsuo	(Chinese Taipei) Chen Hung-ling (Chinese Taipei) Chou Chia-chi
2009	(Indonesia) Dionysius Hayom Rumbaka	(Indonesia) Maria Febe Kusumastuti	(Malaysia) Gan Teik Chai (Malaysia) Tan Bin Shen	(Australia) Huang Chia-chi (Australia) Tang Hetian	(Hong Kong) Yohan Hadikusumo Wiratama (Hong Kong) Chau Hoi Wah
2010	(Vietnam) Nguyễn Tiến Minh	(South Korea) Seo Yoon-hee	(Japan) Hiroyuki Endo (Japan) Kenichi Hayakawa	(South Korea) Kim Min-seo (South Korea) Lee Kyung-won	(South Korea) Cho Gun-woo (South Korea) Kim Min-seo
2011	(Japan) Sho Sasaki	(China) Liu Xin	(Japan) Hiroyuki Endo (Japan) Kenichi Hayakawa	(Japan) Shizuka Matsuo (Japan) Mami Naito	(Thailand) Songphon Anugritayawon (Thailand) Kunchala Voravichitchaikul
2012	(China) Chen Jin	(China) Han Li	(Indonesia) Markis Kido (Indonesia) Hendra Setiawan	(China) Luo Ying (China) Luo Yu	(Chinese Taipei) Chen Hung-ling (Chinese Taipei) Cheng Wen-hsing
2013	(China) Tian Houwei	(Japan) Sayaka Takahashi	(Indonesia) Angga Pratama (Indonesia) Rian Agung Saputro	(Indonesia) Aprilsasi Putri Lejarsar Variella (Indonesia) Vita Marissa	(Indonesia) Irfan Fadhilah (Indonesia) Weni Anggraini
2014	(China) Lin Dan	(India) Saina Nehwal	(South Korea) Lee Yong-dae (South Korea) Yoo Yeon-seong	(China) Tian Qing (China) Zhao Yunlei	(South Korea) Ko Sung-hyun (South Korea) Kim Ha-na
2015	(China) Chen Long	(Spain) Carolina Marín	(South Korea) Lee Yong-dae (South Korea) Yoo Yeon-seong	(China) Ma Jin (China) Tang Yuanting	(Hong Kong) Lee Chun Hei (Hong Kong) Chau Hoi Wah
2016	(Denmark) Hans-Kristian Vittinghus	(India) Saina Nehwal	(Indonesia) Marcus Fernaldi Gideon (Indonesia) Kevin Sanjaya Sukamuljo	(China) Bao Yixin (China) Chen Qingchen	(China) Lu Kai (China) Huang Yaqiong
2017	(India) Srikanth Kidambi	(Japan) Nozomi Okuhara	(Japan) Takeshi Kamura (Japan) Keigo Sonoda	(Japan) Misaki Matsutomo (Japan) Ayaka Takahashi	(China) Zheng Siwei (China) Chen Qingchen
2018	(China) Lu Guangzu	(China) Cai Yanyan	(Indonesia) Berry Angriawan (Indonesia) Hardianto	(Japan) Ayako Sakuramoto (Japan) Yukiko Takahata	(South Korea) Seo Seung-jae (South Korea) Chae Yoo-jung
2019	(Indonesia) Jonatan Christie	(China) Chen Yufei	(South Korea) Ko Sung-hyun (South Korea) Shin Baek-cheol	(Japan) Yuki Fukushima (Japan) Sayaka Hirota	(China) Wang Yilyu (China) Huang Dongping
2020	Cancelled (Note: This tournament, originally to be played from 2 to 7 June, was later cancelled due to the COVID-19 pandemic in Australia.)				
2021	Cancelled (Note: This tournament, originally to be played from 11 to 16 May, was later cancelled due to the COVID-19 pandemic in Australia.)				
2022	(China) Shi Yuqi	(South Korea) An Se-young	(China) Liu Yuchen (China) Ou Xuanyi	(China) Zhang Shuxian (China) Zheng Yu	(South Korea) Seo Seung-jae (South Korea) Chae Yoo-jung
2023	(China) Weng Hongyang	(United States) Beiwen Zhang	(South Korea) Kang Min-hyuk (South Korea) Seo Seung-jae	(South Korea) Kim So-yeong (South Korea) Kong Hee-yong	(China) Feng Yanzhe (China) Huang Dongping
2024	(Malaysia) Lee Zii Jia	(Japan) Aya Ohori	(China) He Jiting (China) Ren Xiangyu	(Indonesia) Febriana Dwipuji Kusuma (Indonesia) Amallia Cahaya Pratiwi	(China) Jiang Zhenbang (China) Wei Yaxin
2025	(India) Lakshya Sen	(South Korea) An Se-young	(Indonesia) Raymond Indra (Indonesia) Nikolaus Joaquin	(Indonesia) Rachel Allessya Rose (Indonesia) Febi Setianingrum	(Malaysia) Chen Tang Jie (Malaysia) Toh Ee Wei
2026	(Indonesia) Alwi Farhan	(Japan) Akane Yamaguchi	(China) Chen Boyang (China) Liu Yi	(China) Jia Yifan (China) Zhang Shuxian	(China) Feng Yanzhe (China) Huang Dongping

== Performances by nation ==
As of of 2026 edition

Pos	Nation	MS	WS	MD	WD	XD	Total
1	Australia*	2	11	10.5	11	10.5	45
2	China	7	4	3	6	6	26
3	Indonesia	8	2	5.5	3.5	1	20
4	Japan	2	7	3	7.5		19.5
5	South Korea		3	6	3	4	16
6	Hong Kong	4		3		3.5	10.5
7	Malaysia	4		3		2.5	9.5
7	New Zealand	1	1	1	3	3.5	9.5
9	India	2	2				4
10	Chinese Taipei		1			2	3
10	England	3					3
12	Germany		1			0.5	1.5
13	Denmark	1					1
13	France		1				1
13	Philippines				1		1
13	Spain		1				1
13	Thailand					1	1
13	United States		1				1
13	Vietnam	1					1
20	Netherlands					0.5	0.5
Total		35	35	35	35	35	175

* Host nation
