= New Zealand Open (badminton) =

Badminton tournament in New Zealand

- Official website
- Founded: 1990; 36 years ago
- Editions: 26 (2019)
- Location: Auckland (2019); New Zealand
- Venue: Eventfinda Stadium (2019)
- Prize money: US$150,000 (2019)

Men's
- Draw: 32S / 32D
- Current champions: Jonatan Christie (singles); Mohammad Ahsan; Hendra Setiawan (doubles)
- Most singles titles: 3 Geoff Bellingham
- Most doubles titles: 4 Dean Galt

Women's
- Draw: 32S / 32D
- Current champions: An Se-young (singles); Kim So-yeong; Kong Hee-yong (doubles)
- Most singles titles: 3 Li Feng
- Most doubles titles: 7 Rhona Robertson

Mixed doubles
- Draw: 32
- Current champions: Chan Peng Soon; Goh Liu Ying
- Most titles (male): 3 Peter Blackburn
- Most titles (female): 2 Rhonda Cator; Goh Liu Ying; Tammy Jenkins; Sara Petersen; Annisa Saufika; Tung Chau Man

Super 300
- Canada Open; German Open; Korea Masters; Macau Open; New Zealand Open; Orléans Masters; Spain Masters; Swiss Open; Syed Modi International; Taipei Open; Thailand Masters; U.S. Open

Last completed
- 2019 New Zealand Open

The New Zealand Open in badminton is an international tournament held in New Zealand. In 2011, the New Zealand International was originally scheduled to be a Grand Prix event, but was downgraded to International Challenge level due to lack of funding. This tournament has been a part of BWF World Tour since 2018.

On 6 March 2023, the Badminton World Federation announced that Badminton New Zealand has relinquished its rights to host the tournament until 2026.

== Previous winners ==
Year	Men's singles	Women's singles	Men's doubles	Women's doubles	Mixed doubles
1990	(New Zealand) Nicholas Hall	(New Zealand) Stephanie Spicer	(New Zealand) Dean Galt (New Zealand) Nicholas Hall	(New Zealand) Rhona Robertson (New Zealand) Lynne Scutt	(New Zealand) Brent Chapman (New Zealand) Tammy Jenkins
1991	(Chinese Taipei) Wei Yan	(Australia) Anna Lao	(Australia) Peter Blackburn (Australia) Darren McDonald	(Australia) Rhonda Cator (Australia) Anna Lao	(Australia) Peter Blackburn (Australia) Lisa Campbell
1992	(New Zealand) Dean Galt	(New Zealand) Julie Still	(New Zealand) Andrew Compton (New Zealand) Dean Galt	(New Zealand) Tammy Jenkins (New Zealand) Rhona Robertson	(New Zealand) Grant Walker (New Zealand) Sheree Jefferson
1993	(New Zealand) Dean Galt	(New Zealand) Rhona Robertson	(New Zealand) Dean Galt (New Zealand) Kerrin Harrison	(New Zealand) Liao Yue Jin (New Zealand) Rhona Robertson	(New Zealand) Dean Galt (New Zealand) Liao Yue Jin
1994	(Germany) Oliver Pongratz	(Australia) Song Yang	(Germany) Michael Helber (Germany) Michael Keck	(Australia) Lisa Campbell (Australia) Amanda Hardy	(Australia) Peter Blackburn (Australia) Rhonda Cator
1995	(Hong Kong) Tam Kai Chuen	(Australia) Song Yang	(Hong Kong) Chan Siu Kwong (Hong Kong) He Tim	(New Zealand) Tammy Jenkins (New Zealand) Rhona Robertson	(Hong Kong) He Tim (Hong Kong) Chan Oi Ni
1996	(Hong Kong) Tam Kai Chuen	(New Zealand) Li Feng	(Hong Kong) Chow Kin Man (Hong Kong) Ma Che Kong	(New Zealand) Tammy Jenkins (New Zealand) Rhona Robertson	(Hong Kong) Tam Kai Chuen (Hong Kong) Tung Chau Man
1997	(New Zealand) Nicholas Hall	(New Zealand) Li Feng	(Hong Kong) Liu Kwok Wa (Hong Kong) Ma Che Kong	(New Zealand) Tammy Jenkins (New Zealand) Rhona Robertson	(Hong Kong) Ma Che Kong (Hong Kong) Tung Chau Man
1998	(New Zealand) Geoffrey Bellingham	(New Zealand) Li Feng	(New Zealand) Dean Galt (New Zealand) Daniel Shirley	(New Zealand) Tammy Jenkins (New Zealand) Rhona Robertson	(New Zealand) Dean Galt (New Zealand) Tammy Jenkins
2000	(New Zealand) Geoffrey Bellingham	(New Zealand) Rhona Robertson	(New Zealand) John Gordon (New Zealand) Daniel Shirley	(Japan) Masami Yamazaki (Japan) Keiko Yoshitomi	(Australia) Peter Blackburn (Australia) Rhonda Cator
2002	(New Zealand) Geoffrey Bellingham	(South Korea) Kim Ji-hyun	(New Zealand) John Gordon (New Zealand) Daniel Shirley	(New Zealand) Nicole Gordon (New Zealand) Sara Runesten-Petersen	(New Zealand) Daniel Shirley (New Zealand) Sara Runesten-Petersen
2003	(Japan) Shōji Satō	(Australia) Lenny Permana	(Australia) Ashley Brehaut (Australia) Travis Denney	(New Zealand) Nicole Gordon (New Zealand) Rebecca Gordon	(Australia) Travis Denney (Australia) Kate Wilson-Smith
2004	(England) Andrew Smith	(Chinese Taipei) Huang Chia-chi	(Japan) Suichi Nakao (Japan) Suichi Sakamoto	(New Zealand) Rebecca Gordon (New Zealand) Rachel Hindley	(New Zealand) Craig Cooper (New Zealand) Lianne Shirley
2005	(Malaysia) Sairul Amar Ayob	(Indonesia) Adriyanti Firdasari	(Australia) Boyd Cooper (Australia) Travis Denney	(New Zealand) Rebecca Bellingham (New Zealand) Rachel Hindley	(New Zealand) Daniel Shirley (New Zealand) Sara Runesten-Petersen
2006	(Malaysia) Lee Tsuen Seng	(Australia) Huang Chia-chi	(Indonesia) Eng Hian (Indonesia) Rian Sukmawan	(Singapore) Jiang Yanmei (Singapore) Li Yujia	(Singapore) Hendri Saputra (Singapore) Li Yujia
2007	(Indonesia) Andre Kurniawan Tedjono	(Hong Kong) Zhou Mi	(Malaysia) Chan Chong Ming (Malaysia) Hoon Thien How	(Japan) Ikue Tatani (Japan) Aya Wakisaka	(Indonesia) Devin Lahardi Fitriawan (Indonesia) Lita Nurlita
2008	(Malaysia) Lee Tsuen Seng	(Hong Kong) Zhou Mi	(Chinese Taipei) Chen Hung-ling (Chinese Taipei) Lin Yu-lang	(Chinese Taipei) Chien Yu-chin (Chinese Taipei) Chou Chia-chi	(Chinese Taipei) Chen Hung-ling (Chinese Taipei) Chou Chia-chi
2009	(Hong Kong) Chan Yan Kit	(Japan) Sayaka Sato	(India) Rupesh Kumar (India) Sanave Thomas	(Indonesia) Anneke Feinya Agustin (Indonesia) Annisa Wahyuni	(Indonesia) Fran Kurniawan (Indonesia) Pia Zebadiah Bernadet
2010	no competition				
2011	(Japan) Riichi Takeshita	(Japan) Sayaka Sato	(Singapore) Danny Bawa Chrisnanta (Singapore) Hendra Wijaya	(Japan) Yuriko Miki (Japan) Koharu Yonemoto	(Singapore) Danny Bawa Chrisnanta (Singapore) Vanessa Neo
2012	no competition				
2013	(Japan) Riichi Takeshita	(China) Deng Xuan	(Indonesia) Angga Pratama (Indonesia) Rian Agung Saputro	(China) Ou Dongni (China) Tang Yuanting	(Indonesia) Praveen Jordan (Indonesia) Vita Marissa
2014	(Chinese Taipei) Wang Tzu-wei	(Japan) Nozomi Okuhara	(Indonesia) Selvanus Geh (Indonesia) Kevin Sanjaya Sukamuljo	(Australia) Tang Hetian (Australia) Renuga Veeran	(Indonesia) Alfian Eko Prasetya (Indonesia) Annisa Saufika
2015	(South Korea) Lee Hyun-il	(Japan) Saena Kawakami	(China) Huang Kaixiang (China) Zheng Siwei	(China) Xia Huan (China) Zhong Qianxin	(China) Zheng Siwei (China) Chen Qingchen
2016	(China) Huang Yuxiang	(South Korea) Sung Ji-hyun	(South Korea) Ko Sung-hyun (South Korea) Shin Baek-cheol	(Japan) Yuki Fukushima (Japan) Sayaka Hirota	(Malaysia) Chan Peng Soon (Malaysia) Goh Liu Ying
2017	(Hong Kong) Lee Cheuk Yiu	(Thailand) Ratchanok Intanon	(Chinese Taipei) Chen Hung-ling (Chinese Taipei) Wang Chi-lin	(Malaysia) Vivian Hoo (Malaysia) Woon Khe Wei	(Indonesia) Ronald Alexander (Indonesia) Annisa Saufika
2018	(China) Lin Dan	(Japan) Sayaka Takahashi	(Chinese Taipei) Chen Hung-ling (Chinese Taipei) Wang Chi-lin	(Japan) Ayako Sakuramoto (Japan) Yukiko Takahata	(Chinese Taipei) Wang Chi-lin (Chinese Taipei) Lee Chia-hsin
2019	(Indonesia) Jonatan Christie	(South Korea) An Se-young	(Indonesia) Mohammad Ahsan (Indonesia) Hendra Setiawan	(South Korea) Kim So-yeong (South Korea) Kong Hee-yong	(Malaysia) Chan Peng Soon (Malaysia) Goh Liu Ying
2020	Cancelled (Note: This tournament, originally to be played from 20 to 25 October, was later cancelled due to COVID-19 pandemic in New Zealand.)				
2021	Cancelled (Note: This tournament, originally to be played from 4 to 9 May, was later cancelled due to COVID-19 pandemic in New Zealand.)				
2022	Cancelled (Note: This tournament, originally to be played from 22 to 27 November, was later cancelled due to COVID-19 pandemic in New Zealand.)				
2023– 2026	Cancelled (Note: This tournament, originally to be played on 8–13 August, was later cancelled because Badminton New Zealand has relinquished its hosting rights of the HSBC BWF World Tour Super 300 New Zealand Open for the next four years.)				

== Performances by countries ==
Winning countries
Pos	Country	MS	WS	MD	WD	XD	Total
1	New Zealand	7	7	6	11	7	38
2	Australia		5	3	3	4	15
3	Japan	3	5	1	5		14
4	Indonesia	2	1	4	1	5	13
5	Hong Kong	4	2	3		3	12
6	Chinese Taipei	2	1	3	1	2	9
7	China	2	1	1	2	1	7
7	Malaysia	3		1	1	2	7
9	South Korea	1	3	1	1		6
10	Singapore			1	1	2	4
11	Germany	1		1			2
12	England	1					1
12	India			1			1
12	Thailand		1				1
Total		26	26	26	26	26	130
