= Badminton at the 1992 Summer Olympics – Women's doubles =

Badminton at the Olympics

Women's Doubles at the Games of the XXV Olympiad
- Venue: Pavelló de la Mar Bella
- Date: 28 July – 4 August 1992
- Competitors: 29 pairs from 20 nations

Medalists
1st place, gold medalist(s)		Hwang Hye-young; Chung So-young	South Korea
2nd place, silver medalist(s)		Guan Weizhen; Nong Qunhua	China
3rd place, bronze medalist(s)		Gil Young-ah; Shim Eun-jung	South Korea
3rd place, bronze medalist(s)		Lin Yanfen; Yao Fen	China

29 pairs from 20 nations competed in women's doubles.

== Seeds ==
1. Hwang Hye-young / Chung So-young (KOR) (gold medalists)
2. Guan Weizhen / Nong Qunhua (CHN) (silver medalists)
3. Gil Young-ah / Shim Eun-jung (KOR) (bronze medalists)
4. Lin Yanfen / Yao Fen (CHN) (bronze medalists)

== Results ==
=== Top half ===
First round
(South Korea) Hwang Hye-young (South Korea) Chung So-young
bye
(Japan) Harumi Kohara (Japan) Hisuko Mizui	15	15
(United States) Linda French (United States) Joy Kitzmiller	6	12
(United Kingdom) Julie Bradbury (United Kingdom) Gillian Clark	15	4	17
(Indonesia) Erma Sulistianingsih (Indonesia) Rosiana Tendean	10	15	15
(Germany) Katrin Schmidt (Germany) Kerstin Ubben	15	15
(Hungary) Andrea Dako (Hungary) Csilla Forian	4	6
(China) Lin Yan Fen (China) Yao Fen
Bye
(Japan) Kimiko Jinnai (Japan) Hisako Mori	14	18	10
(Denmark) Pernille Dupont (Denmark) Grete Mogensen	18	14	2
(Poland) Bożena Bąk (Poland) Wioletta Wilk	17	15
(Bulgaria) Emilia Dimitrova (Bulgaria) Nely Nedjalkova	16	8
(Australia) Anna Lao (Australia) Rhonda Cator	15	15
(Switzerland) Silvia Albrech (Switzerland) Bettina Villars	3	6

Second round
(South Korea) Hwang Hye-young (South Korea) Chung So-young	15	15
(Japan) Harumi Kohara (Japan) Hisuko Mizui	11	2
(United Kingdom) Julie Bradbury (United Kingdom) Gillian Clark	18	15
(Germany) Katrin Schmidt (Germany) Kerstin Ubben	14	5
(China) Lin Yan Fen (China) Yao Fen	15	15
(Japan) Kimiko Jinnai (Japan) Hisako Mori	7	6
(Poland) Bożena Bąk (Poland) Wioletta Wilk	3	12
(Australia) Anna Lao (Australia) Rhonda Cator	15	15

Quarterfinals
(South Korea) Hwang Hye-young (South Korea) Chung So-young	15	15
(United Kingdom) Julie Bradbury (United Kingdom) Gillian Clark	5	5
(China) Lin Yan Fen (China) Yao Fen	18	15
(Australia) Anna Lao (Australia) Rhonda Cator	13	5

Semifinals
(South Korea) Hwang Hye-young (South Korea) Chung So-young	15	15
(China) Lin Yan Fen (China) Yao Fen	9	8

=== Bottom half ===
First round
(Japan) Tomomi Matsuo (Japan) Kyoko Sasage	15	15
(Bulgaria) Diana Filipova (Bulgaria) Diana Koleva	1	2
(Indonesia) Finarsih (Indonesia) Lili Tampi	15	15
(Poland) Bożena Haracz (Poland) Beata Syta	1	9
(Thailand) Ladawan Mulasartsatorn (Thailand) Piyathip Sansaniyakulvilai	15	15
(Mauritius) Martine de Souza (Mauritius) Vandanah Seesurun	2	1
(South Korea) Gil Young-ah (South Korea) Shim Eun-jung	15	15
(New Zealand) Tammy Jenkins (New Zealand) Rhona Robertson	4	2
(Sweden) Catrine Bengtsson (Sweden) Maria Bengtsson	15	7	15
(Netherlands) Eline Coene (Netherlands) Erica van den Heuvel	10	15	8
(United Kingdom) Gillian Gowers (United Kingdom) Sara Sankey	15	15
(France) Virginie Delvingt (France) Christelle Mol	7	7
(Denmark) Lisbet Stuer-Lauridsen (Denmark) Marlene Thomsen	15	16	18
(Canada) Denyse Julien (Canada) Doris Piche	9	18	14
(China) Guan Weizhen (China) Nong Qunhua
bye

Second round
(Japan) Tomomi Matsuo (Japan) Kyoko Sasage	11	8
(Indonesia) Finarsih (Indonesia) Lili Tampi	15	15
(Thailand) Ladawan Mulasartsatorn (Thailand) Piyathip Sansaniyakulvilai	8	6
(South Korea) Gil Young-ah (South Korea) Shim Eun-jung	15	15
(Sweden) Catrine Bengtsson (Sweden) Maria Bengtsson	15	15
(United Kingdom) Gillian Gowers (United Kingdom) Sara Sankey	8	8
(Denmark) Lisbet Stuer-Lauridsen (Denmark) Marlene Thomsen	3	12
(China) Guan Weizhen (China) Nong Qunhua	15	15

Quarterfinals
(Indonesia) Finarsih (Indonesia) Lili Tampi	8	3
(South Korea) Gil Young-ah (South Korea) Shim Eun-jung	15	15
(Sweden) Catrine Bengtsson (Sweden) Maria Bengtsson	4	9
(China) Guan Weizhen (China) Nong Qunhua	15	15

Semifinals
(South Korea) Gil Young-ah (South Korea) Shim Eun-jung	12	15	8
(China) Guan Weizhen (China) Nong Qunhua	15	2	15

=== Finals ===
Semifinals
(South Korea) Hwang Hye-young (South Korea) Chung So-young	15	15
(China) Lin Yan Fen (China) Yao Fen	9	8
(South Korea) Gil Young-ah (South Korea) Shim Eun-jung	12	15	8
(China) Guan Weizhen (China) Nong Qunhua	15	2	15

Final
(South Korea) Hwang Hye-young (South Korea) Chung So-young	18	12	15
(China) Guan Weizhen (China) Nong Qunhua	16	15	13
