= Anna Lao =

Australian badminton player

Anna Lao AM
Personal information
- Born: 7 May 1962 (age 64)
- Years active: 1989-1992
- Height: 166 cm (5 ft 5 in)

Sport
- Country: Australia
- Sport: Badminton
- Handedness: Right

Women's singles & doubles
- Career record: 93 wins, 48 losses
- Highest ranking: 5
- BWF profile

Anna Oi Chan Lao AM (born 7 May 1962) is a former Australian badminton player. She is the most successful badminton player in the history of Australian badminton.

She was ranked 5th in the 1992 Summer Olympics in Barcelona, where badminton had only been introduced for the first time as an Olympic sport. Lao played in the quarterfinals for women's singles and women's doubles where most participants only make it through one discipline.

In the 2021 Queen's Birthday Honours, Lao was appointed as a Member of the Order of Australia for her significant service to badminton, sports & to the multicultural community.

== Career ==
Lao was ranked 2nd in China before she left to represent Australia in the Olympics, in which she was ranked 1st in Australia. She held the times of Master of Sports in China in 1985. Prior to her participation in the Olympics, she held the titles of the Australian Open in 1988, 1989 and 1991 in women's singles, doubles and mixed doubles.

Lao also reached the semifinals of the 1989 Malaysia Open. She was also a champion at the 1991 New Zealand Open and the 1992 French Open. She was a semifinalist at the 1992 Swedish Open.

=== 1992 Barcelona Olympics ===
Badminton was first introduced to the Olympic Games in the 1992 Barcelona Olympics. She placed 5th in women's singles & women's doubles.

==== Women's doubles ====
Lao played with her doubles partner Rhonda Cator. Their first game with Swiss players Silvia Albrecht & Bettina Villars were a success scoring 15–3, 15–6. Their second round was with Polish players Bożena Bąk & Wioletta Wilk Sosnowska where they won 15–3, 15–12. Lao and Cator entered the quarterfinals with the world champions Lin Yanfen & Yao Fen where they lost 13–18, 5–15.

1992 Summer Olympics – Women's doubles
Round	Partner	Opponent	Score	Result
1st	(Australia) Rhonda Cator	(Switzerland) Silvia Albrech (Switzerland) Bettina Villars	15–3, 15–6	Win
2nd	(Australia) Rhonda Cator	(Poland) Bożena Bąk (Poland) Wioletta Wilk	15–3, 15–12	Win
QF	(Australia) Rhonda Cator	(China) Lin Yan Fen (China) Yao Fen	13–18, 5–15	Lost

==== Women's singles ====
Lao played a total of 4 games and entered the quarterfinals. Her first game was with Bettina Villars, whom she played against previously in doubles and won easily in two games. Her second round was with Camilla Martin, a player from Denmark who later on received the European Championship three times. Lao won 11–6, 12–11. She later played with the European champion at the time, Elena Rybkina. Lao won in three games. After winning the third round of games, she was placed in the quarterfinals where she versed world champion Tang Jiuhong, and lost both games.

1992 Summer Olympics – Women's singles ^{(1)}
Round	Opponent	Score	Result
1st	(Switzerland) Bettina Villars	11–0, 11–4	Win
2nd	(Denmark) Camilla Martin	11–6, 12–11	Win
3rd	(International Olympic Committee) Elena Rybkhina	7–11, 11–7, 11–8	Win
QF	(China) Tang Jiuhong	1–11, 9–11	Lost

== Awards and recognition ==
- Courvoisier Award for Excellence Sports (1993)
- World Morning Cup 50-54 age Mix-Doubles Champion, Double 3rd (2012)
- World Morning Cup 50-54 age Mix-Doubles Champion, Double 3rd (2013)
- WCBF 20th Anniversary Individual Events 50-54 age Mix-Doubles Champion, Doubles 3rd (2013)
- Award Medal (AM) as a Member of the Order of Australia (2021)

== Achievements ==
=== IBF International (11 titles, 2 runner-up) ===
Women's singles

Year	Tournament	Opponent	Score	Result
1989	Australian Open	(Australia) Rhonda Cator	11–5, 11–0	(gold) Winner
1990	Australian Open	(Indonesia) Susi Susanti	1–11, 4–11	(silver) Runner-up
1991	Australian Open	(Australia) Rhonda Cator	11–9, 11–1	(gold) Winner
1991	New Zealand Open	(Australia) Rhonda Cator	11–0, 12–11	(gold) Winner

Women's doubles

Year	Tournament	Partner	Opponent	Score	Result
1989	Australian Open	(Australia) Teresa Lian	(Australia) Rhonda Cator (Australia) Gillian Sanderson	15–9, 15–3	(gold) Winner
1990	Australian Open	(Australia) Rhonda Cator	(Australia) Lisa Campbell (Indonesia) Susi Susanti	15–8, 15–2	(gold) Winner
1991	Australian Open	(Australia) Rhonda Cator	(Australia) Teresa Lian (Australia) Song Yang	15–3, 15–4	(gold) Winner
1991	New Zealand Open	(Australia) Rhonda Cator	(Australia) Lisa Campbell (Australia) Adele Macdonald	15–7, 15–7	(gold) Winner
1992	French Open	(Australia) Rhonda Cator	(Germany) Katrin Schmidt (Germany) Kerstin Ubben	15–7, 15–5	(gold) Winner

Mixed doubles

Year	Tournament	Partner	Opponent	Score	Result
1989	Australian Open	(Hong Kong) He Tim	(Australia) Gary Silvester (Australia) Tracey Small	15–11, 15–10	(gold) Winner
1990	Australian Open	(Hong Kong) He Tim	(Indonesia) Ardy Wiranata (Indonesia) Susi Susanti	15–11, 15–12	(gold) Winner
1991	Australian Open	(Hong Kong) He Tim	(Australia) Peter Blackburn (Australia) Lisa Campbell	15–5, 15–4	(gold) Winner
1991	New Zealand Open	(Australia) Darren Macdonald	(Australia) Peter Blackburn (Australia) Lisa Campbell	8–15, 16–17	(silver) Runner-up
