= Diana Koleva =

Bulgarian badminton player

Personal information
- Full name: Diana Khristova Koleva-Tsvetanova
- Born: 24 October 1959 (age 67) Sofia, PR Bulgaria
- Height: 1.65 m (5 ft 5 in)
- Weight: 58 kg (128 lb)

Sport
- Country: Bulgaria
- Sport: Badminton
- Handedness: Right
- Event: Women's singles & doubles

Women's singles & doubles
- BWF profile

Diana Khristova Koleva-Tsvetanova (née Koleva, Bulgarian: Диана Колева; born 24 October 1959) is a Bulgarian former badminton player. She competed in three consecutive Summer Olympics in 1992 Barcelona, 1996 Atlanta, and 2000 Sydney. Koleva won sixteen times the National Championships title from 1985 to 2003. She also won the women's singles title at the 1988/89 season of European Circuit.

== Achievements ==
=== IBF World Grand Prix ===
The World Badminton Grand Prix has been sanctioned by the International Badminton Federation from 1983 to 2006.

Women's doubles
Year	Tournament	Partner	Opponent	Score	Result
1995	Bulgarian Open	(Bulgaria) Neli Boteva	(Switzerland) Silvia Albrecht (Switzerland) Santi Wibowo	15–7, 15–5	(gold) Winner

=== IBF International Challenge/Series ===
Women's singles
Year	Tournament	Opponent	Score	Result
1986	Austrian International	(West Germany) Birgit Schilling	6–11, 11–6, 11–5	(gold) Winner
1987	Bulgarian International	(East Germany) Monika Cassens	11–12, 7–11	(silver) Runner-up
1989	Malta International	(Bulgaria) Neli Boteva	11–3, 11–2	(gold) Winner
1990	La Chaux-de-Fonds International	(Switzerland) Bettina Villars	11–2, 12–9	(silver) Runner-up
1990	Malta International	(West Germany) Mira Sundari	7–11, 7–11	(silver) Runner-up
1994	Lausanne International	(Netherlands) Brenda Conijn	4–11, 11–7, 12–10	(gold) Winner

Women's doubles
Year	Tournament	Partner	Opponent	Score	Result
1987	Bulgarian International	(Bulgaria) Diana Filipova	(East Germany) Monika Cassens (East Germany) Petra Michalowsky	6–15, 4–15	(silver) Runner-up
1989	Malta International	(Bulgaria) Emilia Dimitrova	(Austria) Andrea Roschinsky (West Germany) Sophie Rotermund	15–5, 15–4	(gold) Winner
1989	Bulgarian International	(Soviet Union) Vlada Chernyavskaya	(China) Lin Yanfen (China) Zhang Wanling	6–15, 4–15	(silver) Runner-up
1990	La Chaux-de-Fonds International	(Bulgaria) Emilia Dimitrova	(West Germany) Monika Cassens (West Germany) Petra Michalowsky	6–15, 9–15	(silver) Runner-up
1990	Malta International	(Bulgaria) Emilia Dimitrova	(West Germany) Monika Cassens (West Germany) Petra Michalowsky	10–15, 5–15	(silver) Runner-up
1990	Bulgarian International	(Denmark) Helene Kirkegaard	(West Germany) Katrin Schmidt (West Germany) Kerstin Ubben	15–7, 15–3	(gold) Winner
1992	Malta International	(Cyprus) Diana Knekna	(Bulgaria) Neli Boteva (Bulgaria) Emilia Dimitrova	15–10, 18–15	(gold) Winner
1994	Czech International	(Bulgaria) Neli Boteva	(Denmark) Lone Sørensen (Denmark) Mette Sørensen	14–17, 11–15	(silver) Runner-up
1996	Le Volant d'Or de Toulouse	(Bulgaria) Neli Boteva	(France) Sandrine Lefèvre (France) Tatiana Vattier	15–5, 15–4	(gold) Winner
1998	French Open	(Bulgaria) Neli Boteva	(Chinese Taipei) Tsai Hui-min (Chinese Taipei) Chen Li-chin	6–15, 9–15	(silver) Runner-up
1998	Romanian International	(Bulgaria) Raina Tzvetkova	(Romania) Carmen Blanaru (Romania) Alina Pitu	15–3, 15–4	(gold) Winner
1998	Cyprus International	(Bulgaria) Raina Tzvetkova	(Cyprus) Elena Iasonos (Cyprus) Diana Knekna	15–3, 15–7	(gold) Winner
1998	Israel International	(Israel) Svetlana Zilberman	(Cyprus) Elena Iasonos (Cyprus) Diana Knekna	15–1, 15–2	(gold) Winner
1999	Bulgarian International	(Bulgaria) Neli Boteva	(Ukraine) Natalja Esipenko (Ukraine) Natalia Golovkina	13–15, 17–15, 15–0	(gold) Winner
1999	Romanian International	(Bulgaria) Neli Boteva	(Bulgaria) Petya Nedelcheva (Bulgaria) Raina Tzvetkova	12–15, 15–12, 15–3	(gold) Winner
1999	Le Volant d'Or de Toulouse	(Bulgaria) Neli Boteva	(Germany) Nicol Pitro (Germany) Anika Sietz	15–11, 14–17, 10–15	(silver) Runner-up
2000	Croatian International	(Bulgaria) Neli Boteva	(England) Felicity Gallup (England) Joanne Muggeridge	6–15, 15–12, 5–15	(silver) Runner-up
2000	Greece International	(Bulgaria) Petya Nedelcheva	(Bulgaria) Maya Ivanova (Bulgaria) Dobrinka Smilianova	15–7, 15–7	(gold) Winner

Mixed doubles
Year	Tournament	Partner	Opponent	Score	Result
1988	Austrian International	(West Germany) Markus Keck	(Poland) Jerzy Dołhan (Poland) Bożena Haracz	8–15, 9–15	(silver) Runner-up
1989	Malta International	(Bulgaria) Orlin Tzvetanov	(Bulgaria) Vladimir Balun (Bulgaria) Emilia Dimitrova	11–15, 8–15	(silver) Runner-up
1990	Austrian International	(Soviet Union) Nikolai Zuyev	(Denmark) Christian Jakobsen (Denmark) Marlene Thomsen	5–15, 15–11, 6–15	(silver) Runner-up
1990	Irish International	(Austria) Kai Abraham	(West Germany) Michael Keck (Soviet Union) Irina Serova	10–15, 7–15	(silver) Runner-up
1994	Lausanne International	(Russia) Pavel Uvarov	(England) James Anderson (England) Emma Constable	2–15, 16–17	(silver) Runner-up
1996	Le Volant d'Or de Toulouse	(Bulgaria) Svetoslav Stoyanov	(France) Manuel Dubrulle (France) Sandrine Lefèvre	15–10, 15–3	(gold) Winner
1998	Romanian International	(Bulgaria) Konstantin Dobrev	(Romania) Florin Posteucă (Romania) Adina Posteucă	15–11, 15–2	(gold) Winner
1998	Cyprus International	(Bulgaria) Konstantin Dobrev	(Israel) Leon Pugach (Israel) Rina Fridman	15–3, 10–15, 15–3	(gold) Winner
1999	Israel International	(Bulgaria) Luben Panov	(Israel) Leon Pugach (Israel) Rina Fridman	15–8, 10–15, 15–5	(gold) Winner
