= Tanya Cooke =

Northern Irish international badminton player

Personal information
- Nationality: British (Northern Irish)
- Born: c.1970

Sport
- Sport: Badminton
- Club: Bangor Parish BC; Alpha BC, Lisburn

Tanya Cooke (born c.1970), is a former international badminton player from Northern Ireland who competed at the Commonwealth Games.

== Biography ==
Cooke was a member of her Glenlola Collegiate School club and the Bangor Parish Badminton Club. She represented Ulster at the provincial level and represented the Irish U18 team at the 1987 European Junior Championships before joining the U21 squad.

Cooke joined the Alpha Badminton Club in Lisburn and was defeated by Carol Munster in the 1989 ladies singles club championship final. She won the 1989 Northern Irish Schools' Gold Award. She subsequently represented the all-Ireland team at full senior international level.

Cooke was selected for the 1990 Northern Irish team at the 1990 Commonwealth Games in Auckland, New Zealand, where she competed in three events. In the singles she lost to Doris Piché of Canada in group 2 and Cheng Yin Sat of Hong Kong in the first round.
