= Carol Munster =

Northern Irish international badminton player

Personal information
- Nationality: British (Northern Irish)
- Born: c.1967

Sport
- Sport: Badminton
- Club: Alpha BC, Lisburn

Carol Munster (born c.1967), is a former international badminton player from Northern Ireland who competed at the Commonwealth Games.

== Biography ==
Munster attended St Colm's High School. She was a member of the Alpha Badminton Club of Lisburn and defeated Tanya Cooke in the 1989 ladies singles club championship final. In 1986 she won a bronze medal for the Irish U18 in the Finlandia Cup and the following year she was chosen for the Irish U21 team.

Munster represented Ulster at the provincial level and represented the all-Ireland team at the international level.

Munster was selected for the 1990 Northern Irish team at the 1990 Commonwealth Games in Auckland, New Zealand, where she competed in four events.
