= Nichola Beck =

English badminton player

Personal information
- Born: Nichola Louise Beck; 12 June 1973 (age 53) Ealing, West London, England
- Height: 1.70 m (5 ft 7 in)

Sport
- Country: England
- Sport: Badminton
- Handedness: Right
- BWF profile
Medal record
Women's badminton
Representing England
European Mixed Team Championships
Bronze medal – third place	1996 Herning	Mixed team

Nichola Louise Beck (born 1973) is a former English badminton international player and a former national champion.

== Biography ==
Beck became an English national champion after winning the English National Badminton Championships women's doubles title with Joanne Davies in 1997. The pair had previously finished runner-up in 1995.

She represented Buckinghamshire. In 1994, she won the silver medal at the World University Championships in the mixed doubles partnered with John Quinn.

== Achievements ==
=== IBF World Grand Prix ===
The World Badminton Grand Prix sanctioned by International Badminton Federation (IBF) since 1983.

Women's doubles
Year	Tournament	Partner	Opponent	Score	Result
1996	Brunei Open	(England) Joanne Davies	(Thailand) Thitikan Duangsiri (Thailand) Pornsawan Plungwech	8–15, 11–15	(silver) Runner-up

=== IBF International ===
Women's doubles
Year	Tournament	Partner	Opponent	Score	Result
1993	Irish International	(England) Joanne Davies	(England) Karen Peatfield (England) Justine Willmott	15–1, 15–4	(gold) Winner
1994	Wimbledon International	(England) Tracy Dineen	(Russia) Irina Yakusheva (Russia) Marina Yakusheva	9–15, 15–11, 10–15	(silver) Runner-up
1995	Wimbledon International	(England) Joanne Muggeridge	(Netherlands) Eline Coene (Netherlands) Erica van den Heuvel	15–8, 12–15, 12–15	(silver) Runner-up
1996	Finnish International	(England) Joanne Davies	(Wales) Kelly Morgan (England) Joanne Muggeridge	3–15, 10–15	(silver) Runner-up

Mixed doubles
Year	Tournament	Partner	Opponent	Score	Result
1993	Czech International	(England) John Quinn	(England) James Anderson (England) Emma Constable	17–14, 15–2	(gold) Winner
