= Amanda Hardy =

Australian badminton player

Personal information
- Born: Amanda Jane Hardy; December 10, 1971 (age 54) Altona, Victoria, Australia
- Height: 163 cm (64 in)

Sport
- Country: Australia
- Sport: Badminton
- Handedness: Left
- BWF profile
Medal record
Badminton
Representing Australia
Commonwealth Games
Bronze medal – third place	1994 Victoria	Mixed team
Bronze medal – third place	1998 Kuala Lumpur	Women's team

Amanda Jane Hardy (born 10 December 1971) is a retired female badminton player from Australia. Hardy was a ladies doubles and mixed doubles specialist.

== Career ==
Hardy competed in badminton at the 1996 Summer Olympics in women's doubles with Rhonda Cator and the mixed doubles with Paul Stevenson. She also competed at the 2000 Summer Olympics in the ladies doubles with Rhonda Cator and the mixed doubles with David Bamford.

Hardy competed at two Commonwealth Games (Victoria 1994 – bronze medal, Kuala Lumpur 1998 – bronze medal).
