= Piyathip Sansaniyakulvilai =

Thai badminton player (born 1972)

Personal information
- Country: Thailand
- Born: 23 October 1972 (age 52)
Medal record
Women's badminton
Representing Thailand
Asian Championships
Silver medal – second place	1992 Kuala Lumpur	Women's doubles
Southeast Asian Games
Silver medal – second place	1987 Jakarta	Women's team
Silver medal – second place	1989 Kuala Lumpur	Women's team
Silver medal – second place	1993 Singapore	Women's team
Bronze medal – third place	1987 Jakarta	Women's doubles
Bronze medal – third place	1993 Singapore	Women's doubles

Piyathip Sansaniyakulvilai (born 23 October 1972) is a Thai badminton player. She competed in women's doubles at the 1992 Summer Olympics in Barcelona.
