= Eline Coene =

Dutch badminton player (born 1964)

Personal information
- Born: 11 April 1964 (age 62) Rhenen, Netherlands
- Height: 1.70 m (5 ft 7 in)

Sport
- Country: Netherlands
- Sport: Badminton
- Handedness: Right
- BWF profile
Medal record
Women's badminton
Representing Netherlands
World Cup
Bronze medal – third place	1990 Bandung & Jakarta	Women's doubles
European Championships
Silver medal – second place	1990 Moscow	Women's doubles
Bronze medal – third place	1988 Kristiansand	Women's singles

Eline Olga Coene (born 11 April 1964) is a Dutch badminton player.

== Biography ==
Coene competed in women's singles and women's doubles at the 1992 Summer Olympics in Barcelona, and in women's doubles at the 1996 Summer Olympics in Atlanta.

Six times she won the women's singles title at the Dutch National Badminton Championships in 1983, 1984, 1985, 1986, 1989 and in 1992. Together with Erica van Dijck she also won the Dutch National women's doubles title nine times in 1985 & 1986 and again continuously from 1988 till 1994.

== Achievements ==
=== World Cup ===
Women's doubles
Year	Venue	Partner	Opponent	Score	Result
1990	Istora Senayan; Jakarta, Indonesia	(Netherlands) Erica van Dijck	(Indonesia) Erma Sulistianingsih (Indonesia) Rosiana Tendean	9–15, 8–15	Bronze

=== European Championships ===
Women's singles
Year	Venue	Opponent	Score	Result
1988	Badmintonsenteret; Kristiansand, Norway	(Denmark) Kirsten Larsen	4–11, 11–3, 11–12	Bronze

Women's doubles
Year	Venue	Partner	Opponent	Score	Result
1990	Luzhniki; Moscow, Soviet Union	(Netherlands) Erica van Dijck	(Denmark) Dorte Kjær (Denmark) Nettie Nielsen	5–15, 6–15	Silver

=== IBF World Grand Prix ===
The World Badminton Grand Prix was sanctioned by the International Badminton Federation from 1983 to 2006.

Women's singles
Year	Tournament	Opponent	Score	Result
1987	Dutch Open	(Indonesia) Sarwendah Kusumawardhani	11–12, 11–12	(silver) Runner-up
1989	Dutch Open	(Sweden) Christine Magnusson	12–11, 11–4	(gold) Winner
1990	Scottish Open	(England) Helen Troke	0–11, 3–11	(silver) Runner-up
1991	Dutch Open	(Indonesia) Sarwendah Kusumawardhani	3–11, 3–11	(silver) Runner-up

Women's doubles
Year	Tournament	Partner	Opponent	Score	Result
1985	Dutch Open	(Netherlands) Erica van Dijck	(England) Gillian Gowers (England) Helen Troke	4–15, 2–15	(silver) Runner-up
1986	Dutch Open	(Netherlands) Erica van Dijck	(England) Gillian Clark (England) Gillian Gowers	15–18, 9–15	(silver) Runner-up
1988	Canadian Open	(Netherlands) Erica van Dijck	(South Korea) Chung So-young (South Korea) Kim Yun-ja	15–4, 15–3	(gold) Winner
1990	Swedish Open	(Netherlands) Erica van den Heuvel	(China) Huang Hua (China) Zhou Lei	15–3, 15–18, 12–15	(silver) Runner-up
1991	Thailand Open	(Netherlands) Erica van den Heuvel	(South Korea) Gil Young-ah (South Korea) Hwang Hye-young	10–15, 6–15	(silver) Runner-up
1992	Chinese Taipei Open	(Netherlands) Erica van den Heuvel	(South Korea) Gil Young-ah (South Korea) Shim Eun-jung	7–15, 6–15	(silver) Runner-up
1996	Hamburg Cup	(Netherlands) Erica van den Heuvel	(Denmark) Tanja Berg (Denmark) Anne Søndergaard	15–5, 15–6	(gold) Winner
1996	Dutch Open	(Netherlands) Erica van den Heuvel	(Sweden) Margit Borg (Sweden) Christine Magnusson	15–1, 15–1	(gold) Winner
1996	German Open	(Netherlands) Erica van den Heuvel	(Indonesia) Indarti Issolina (Indonesia) Deyana Lomban	15–18, 13–18	(silver) Runner-up

=== IBF International ===
Women's singles
Year	Tournament	Opponent	Score	Result
1982	Swiss Open	(Netherlands) Carol Liem	11–9, 11–8	(gold) Winner
1983	Swiss Open	(Switzerland) Liselotte Blumer	11–5, 7–11, 12–10	(gold) Winner
1984	Victor Cup	(Sweden) Christine Magnusson	11–5, 0–11, 11–3	(gold) Winner
1987	Amor International	(Netherlands) Monique Hoogland	11–8, 11–3	(gold) Winner
1992	La Chaux de Fonds International	(Netherlands) Astrid van der Knaap	9–11, 12–11, 7–11	(silver) Runner-up

Women's doubles
Year	Tournament	Partner	Opponent	Score	Result
1982	Swiss Open	(Germany) Angelika Zeisinger	(Netherlands) Grace Kakiay (Netherlands) Paula Kloet	1–15, 7–15	(silver) Runner-up
1983	Swiss Open	(Netherlands) Jeanette van Driel	(Germany) Cathrin Hoppe (Germany) Petra Szczesny	17–14, 15–10	(gold) Winner
1986	Poona Open	(Netherlands) Erica van Dijck	(Germany) Petra Dieris-Wierichs (Germany) Kirsten Schmieder	15–12, 15–6	(gold) Winner
1987	Amor International	(Netherlands) Erica van Dijck	(Netherlands) Monique Hoogland (Netherlands) Esther Villanueva	15–3, 15–7	(gold) Winner
1988	Amor International	(Netherlands) Erica van Dijck	(Netherlands) Monique Hoogland (Netherlands) Astrid van der Knaap	10–15, 15–7, 15–11	(gold) Winner
1991	Amor International	(Netherlands) Erica van den Heuvel	(Denmark) Helle Andersen (Germany) Nicole Tummer	15–6, 15–4	(gold) Winner
1992	La Chaux de Fonds International	(Netherlands) Erica van den Heuvel	(New Zealand) Tammy Jenkins (New Zealand) Rhona Robertson	15–5, 15–4	(gold) Winner
1995	Hamburg Cup	(Netherlands) Erica van den Heuvel	(Denmark) Lotte Olsen (Denmark) Rikke Olsen	6–15, 15–12, 13–15	(silver) Runner-up
1995	Wimbledon International	(Netherlands) Erica van den Heuvel	(England) Nichola Beck (England) Joanne Muggeridge	8–15, 15–12, 15–12	(gold) Winner

BWF International Challenge tournament
BWF International Series tournament
BWF Future Series tournament
