= Neli Boteva =

Bulgarian badminton player

Neli Boteva (Bulgarian: Нели Ботева, née Nedyalkova) (born 9 May 1974) is a badminton player from Bulgaria who participated in four Olympiads in women's doubles.

She first competed in the 1992 SummerOlympics as Nelly Nedyalkova in the women's doubles event with Bulgarian partner Emilia Dimitrova, née Emmy Vlaar. They were defeated by Bożena Bąk & Wioletta Wilk from Poland in the round of 32 with 16-17, 8-15. Her second participation was at the 1996 Summer Olympics in Atlanta, United States with partner Diana Koleva where they lost in the first round to Japanese duo Tomomi Matsuo and Masako Sakamoto with 0-15, 4-15. In 2000 as Neli Boteva she participated at the 2000 Summer Olympics in Australia again with partner Diana Koleva. They were defeated by Chinese duo Gao Ling and Qin Yiyuan 1-15, 9-15. Boteva also competed in the 2004 SummerOlympics in Athens with partner Petya Nedelcheva. They were defeated by Ella Tripp and Joanne Wright of Great Britain in the round of 32 in a close 15-17, 14-17 match.

She won the Bulgarian National Badminton Championships three times in Women's singles in 1995, 1999 and 2003 and 5 times in Women's doubles in 1993, 1996, 2000, 2002 & 2004. The National mixed doubles title she only won once in 2002 with partner Boris Kessov.
