= Virginie Delvingt =

French badminton player

Personal information
- Nationality: French
- Born: 8 July 1971 (age 53); Strasbourg, France

Sport
- Sport: Badminton

Virginie Delvingt (born 8 July 1971) is a French badminton player. She competed in women's singles and women's doubles at the 1992 Summer Olympics in Barcelona.
