= Bożena Haracz =

Polish badminton player (born 1962)

Personal information
- Nationality: Polish
- Born: 28 October 1962 (age 62); Głubczyce, Poland

Sport
- Sport: Badminton

Bożena Wojtkowska-Haracz (born 28 October 1962) is a Polish badminton player. She competed in women's doubles at the 1992 Summer Olympics in Barcelona.
