= Christelle Mol =

French badminton player

Personal information
- Nationality: French
- Born: 3 January 1972 (age 53)

Sport
- Sport: Badminton

Christelle Mol (born 3 January 1972) is a French badminton player. She competed in women's singles and women's doubles at the 1992 Summer Olympics in Barcelona.
