= Kerstin Ubben =

German badminton player

Personal information
- Country: Germany
- Born: 4 September 1968 (age 56); Hamburg, West Germany
- Height: 1.65 m (5 ft 5 in)
- Handedness: Right
Medal record
Women's badminton
Representing Germany
European Championships
Bronze medal – third place	1996 Herning	Women's doubles
- BWF profile

Kerstin Ubben (born 4 September 1968) is a German badminton player, born in Hamburg.

Ubben competed in women's singles and women's doubles at the 1992 Summer Olympics in Barcelona, and in women's doubles at the 1996 Summer Olympics in Atlanta.
