= Lisa Campbell (badminton) =

Australian badminton player

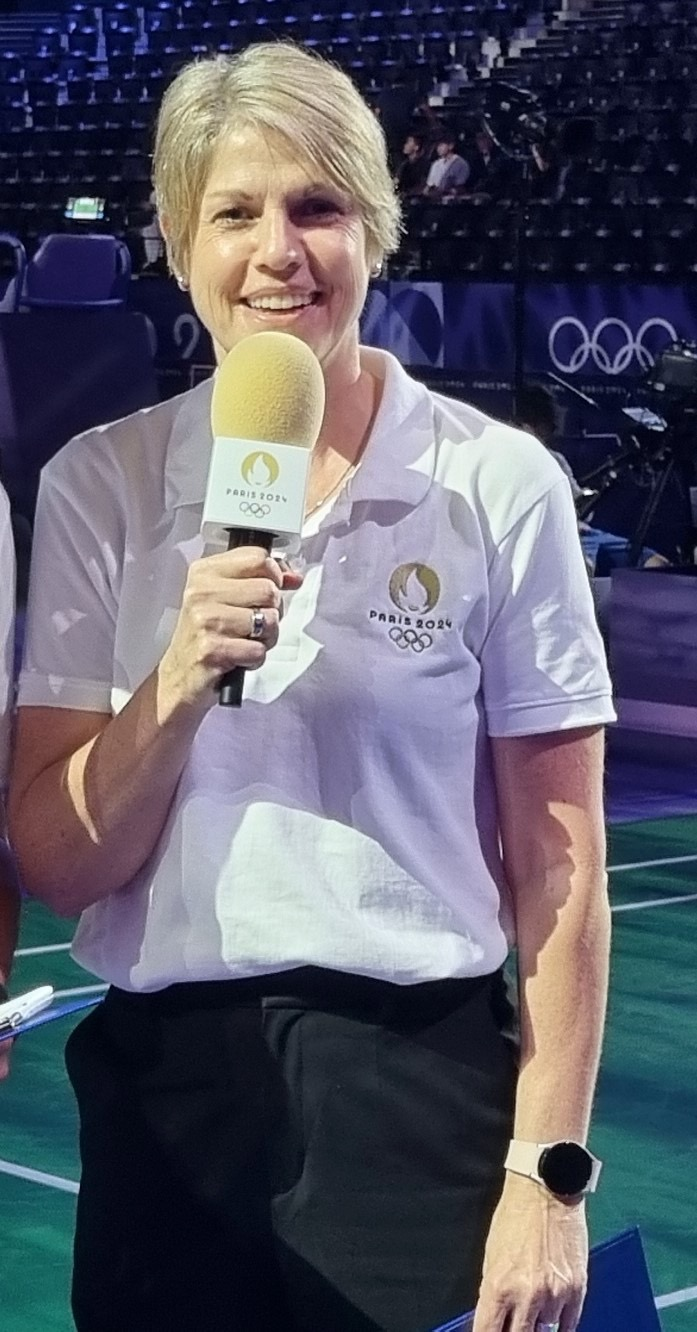
- Campbell in 2025

Personal information
- Born: Lisa Bryant; 1 May 1968 (age 58) Frankston, Victoria, Australia
- Years active: 1985–1997
- Height: 1.68 m (5 ft 6 in)

Sport
- Country: Australia
- Sport: Badminton
- Handedness: Right
- Retired: 1997
- Event: Women's singles; mixed doubles
Medal record
Women's badminton
Representing Australia
Commonwealth Games
Gold medal – first place	1994 Victoria	Women's singles
Bronze medal – third place	1994 Victoria	Mixed team

Lisa Campbell (née Bryant, born 1 May 1968) is a former Australian badminton player and is currently (2026) a sports announcer/commentator. Born in Frankston, Victoria, she competed internationally for Australia from the mid-1980s until her retirement in the late 1990s. She competed as Lisa Bryant prior to her marriage in 1993. Campbell represented Australia in many Uber Cup competitions, World Championships, the 1990 and 1994 Commonwealth Games, and the 1996 Olympic Games. She later became a sports presenter and announcer.

== Early life and introduction to badminton ==
Bryant was born in Frankston, Victoria, the daughter of Graham Bryant and Faye (née Fox). She attended Armata Primary School in Frankston North and later Monterey Secondary College (1980–1984).

She began playing badminton as a twelve-year-old and also participated in athletics during her early teens.

== Playing career ==
=== National and international competition ===
By the mid-1980s, Campbell was competing in junior and open badminton tournaments in Australia. She later represented Australia in international events, including the Uber Cup and World Championships.

=== Commonwealth Games 1990 ===
Selectors cited her achievements in a number of significant competitions in naming her for the 1990 XIVth Commonwealth Games held in Auckland, New Zealand. Bryant (Campbell) was runner-up in the International Ladies Doubles in the 1988 Silver Bowl. She was a member of the 1989 World Championship team and the 1989 Whyte Trophy team. Campbell also reached the third round of the 1989 World Individual Championships. In the Australian Badminton Championships Campbell won the women's singles, women's doubles, and mixed doubles.

=== Commonwealth Games 1994 ===
Women's Badminton in Australia

Commentators consider Campbell's greatest achievement to be when she won the first medal ever for Australia, the gold medal, at the 1994 Commonwealth Games in Victoria, Canada, in the women's singles event. She defeated Rhona Robertson of New Zealand in the semi-final and, on 28 August 1994, Si-an Deng of Canada in the final. Her achievement was considered exceptional, as she was an unseeded player, achieved victory from impending defeat in both the semi-final and the final, and needed painkillers to finish both matches.

Sports commentator and poet Rupert McCall dedicated six stanzas of his 19-stanza poem, "The Great Goldrush", to Campbell's victory. The poem commemorates Australia's then-unprecedented haul of 87 gold medals at the 1994 Commonwealth Games in Victoria, British Columbia. McCall highlighted her status as an unseeded competitor:

They didn't even seed her

at this 15th ever meet,
and there she stood, on number one,
with blisters on her feet...
With every ounce of honesty,
I'll let the truth be told,
I was proud to cry with Lisa

as she tightly clutched at gold.

— Rupert McCall

=== Olympic Games 1996 ===
Campbell represented Australia at the 1996 Summer Olympics in Atlanta, competing in women's singles and mixed doubles.

== Later activities ==
After retiring from competition, Campbell worked as a sports announcer at major sporting events, including the 2006, 2010 and 2018 Commonwealth Games and the 2024 Paris Olympics and Paralympics.
