= Katrin Schmidt (badminton) =

German badminton player

Personal information
- Country: Germany
- Born: 28 September 1967 (age 57); Langenhagen, West Germany
- Height: 1.8 m (5 ft 11 in)
Medal record
Women's badminton
Representing Germany
European Championships
Bronze medal – third place	1996 Herning	Women's doubles
Representing West Germany
European Championships
Bronze medal – third place	1988 Kristiansand	Women's doubles
European Junior Championships
Bronze medal – third place	1985 Pressbaum	Girls' singles
- BWF profile

Katrin Schmidt (born 28 September 1967) is a German badminton player, born in Langenhagen.

Schmidt competed in women's singles and women's doubles at the 1992 Summer Olympics in Barcelona, and in women's doubles at the 1996 Summer Olympics in Atlanta.
