= Silvia Albrecht =

Swiss badminton player (born 1971)

Personal information
- Nationality: Swiss
- Born: 25 February 1971 (age 54)

Sport
- Sport: Badminton

Silvia Albrecht (born 25 February 1971) is a Swiss badminton player. She competed in women's singles and women's doubles at the 1992 Summer Olympics in Barcelona.
