= Emilia Dimitrova =

Bulgarian badminton player

Personal information
- Nationality: Bulgarian
- Born: 27 December 1970 (age 54)

Sport
- Sport: Badminton

Emilia Dimitrova (born 27 December 1970) is a Bulgarian badminton player. She competed in women's doubles at the 1992 Summer Olympics in Barcelona.
