= Rhonda Cator =

Australian badminton player (born 1966)

Personal information
- Full name: Rhonda Maree Cator
- Born: 23 August 1966 (age 60) Numurkah, Victoria, Australia

Sport
- Country: Australia
- Sport: Badminton
- BWF profile
Medal record
Women's badminton
Representing Australia
Commonwealth Games
Bronze medal – third place	1994 Victoria	Mixed doubles
Bronze medal – third place	1986 Edinburgh	Mixed team
Bronze medal – third place	1994 Victoria	Mixed team
Bronze medal – third place	1998 Kuala Lumpur	Mixed doubles
Bronze medal – third place	1998 Kuala Lumpur	Women's team

Rhonda Maree Cator (born 23 August 1966) is an Australian retired badminton player.

== Career ==
Cator competed in badminton at the 1992 Summer Olympics in women's doubles with Anna Lao, and they lost in quarterfinal to Lin Yan Fen and Yao Fen. The same year, they won the French Open. She also competed at the 1996 and 2000 Olympics.

Domestically, Cator has won the national championship in singles, doubles and mixed doubles and has competed at five Commonwealth Games, winning 5 bronze medals as follows: the team event in the 1986 Commonwealth Games, in both the team event and mixed doubles at the 1994 Commonwealth Games and also in both the women's teams event and mixed doubles at the Kuala Lumpur Games four years later.

Cator was the Australian badminton assistant coach at the 2006 Commonwealth Games and team manager at the 2008 Summer Olympics., 2010 Commonwealth Games and 2014 Commonwealth Games.
