= 2002 Uber Cup qualification =

Tournament details
- Dates: 13 November 2001 – 24 February 2002
- Venue: Oceania zone: Altona Badminton Centre; American zone: Coliseo de la Ciudad Deportiva; European zone: Indoor-Sportcentrum Eindhoven
- Location: Oceania zone: Melbourne; American zone: Havana; European zone: Eindhoven

The qualifying process for the 2002 Uber Cup took place from 13 November 2001 to 24 February 2002 to decide the final teams which will play in the final tournament.

== Qualification process ==
The qualification process was divided into two regions, the Oceania Zone and the European Zone. Teams in their respective zone will first compete in a round-robin elimination format. Seeded teams received a bye into the second round while unseeded teams competed in the first round for a place in the second round. Teams in the second round competed for a place in the knockout stages. Semi-final winners in each zone were guaranteed qualification for the final tournament to be held in Guangzhou while the remaining teams competed in a third place playoff match for a place in the final tournament.

China qualified for the final tournament as defending champions and hosts.

=== Qualified teams ===
Country	Qualified as	Qualified on	Final appearance
China	2002 Uber Cup hosts, 2000 Uber Cup winners	21 May 2000	10th
South Korea	Oceania Zone winners	24 February 2002	10th
Hong Kong	Oceania Zone runners-up	24 February 2002	3rd
Indonesia	Oceania Zone semifinalists	24 February 2002	17th
Japan	Oceania Zone semifinalists	24 February 2002	16th
Denmark	European Zone winners	24 February 2002	13th
Germany	European Zone runners-up	24 February 2002	Debut
Netherlands	Third place in European Zone	24 February 2002	6th

== Oceania Zone ==
The qualification rounds for the Oceania Zone were held from 20 to 24 February at the Altona Badminton Centre (formerly Altona Hall) in Melbourne, Australia. Nine teams took part in the competition.

=== Group stage ===
==== Group A ====
Pos	Team	Pld	W	L	MF	MA	MD	GF	GA	GD	PF	PA	PD	Pts	Qualification
1	South Korea	3	3	0	14	1	+13	42	10	+32	339	164	+175	3	Advance to Knockout stage
2	Indonesia	3	2	1	7	8	−1	27	28	−1	276	286	−10	2	Advance to Knockout stage
3	Thailand	3	1	2	6	9	−3	27	29	−2	267	286	−19	1	
4	Australia	3	0	3	3	12	−9	13	42	−29	190	336	−146	0	

Source: Badminton Australia

Australia
1
Altona Badminton Centre
20 February 2002, 18:30 UTC+11

Indonesia
4

			1	2	3	4	5
1	(Australia) (Indonesia)	Rayoni Head; Atu Rosalina	4; 7	4; 7	7; 1	5; 7
2	(Australia) (Indonesia)	Rhonda Cator / Kate Wilson-Smith; Deyana Lomban / Vita Marissa	5; 7	7; 4	3; 7	5; 7
3	(Australia) (Indonesia)	Lenny Permana; Ellen Angelina	7; 3	6; 8	7; 4	1; 7	7; 5
4	(Australia) (Indonesia)	Kellie Lucas / Susan Wang; Emma Ermawati / Minarti Timur	0; 7	3; 7	3; 7
5	(Australia) (Indonesia)	Jane Crabtree; Dian Novita Sari	1; 7	2; 7	2; 7

Thailand
1
Altona Badminton Centre
20 February 2002, 18:30 UTC+11

South Korea
4

			1	2	3	4	5
1	(Thailand) (South Korea)	Sujitra Ekmongkolpaisarn; Jun Jae-youn	7; 0	7; 2	7; 5
2	(Thailand) (South Korea)	Salakjit Ponsana; Lee Kyung-won	0; 7	1; 7	1; 7
3	(Thailand) (South Korea)	Nucharin Teekhatrakul; Ra Kyung-min	0; 7	7; 4	1; 7	4; 7
4	(Thailand) (South Korea)	Sujitra Ekmongkolpaisarn / Saralee Thungthongkam; Hwang Yu-mi / Lee Hyo-jung	7; 5	8; 7	1; 7	5; 7	5; 7
5	(Thailand) (South Korea)	Duanganong Aroonkesorn / Kunchala Voravichitchaikul; Lee Kyung-won / Ra Kyung-min	3; 7	1; 7	6; 8

South Korea
5
Altona Badminton Centre
21 February 2002, 14:00 UTC+11

Australia
0

			1	2	3	4	5
1	(South Korea) (Australia)	Jun Jae-youn; Rayoni Head	7; 2	7; 0	7; 0
2	(South Korea) (Australia)	Lee Kyung-won / Ra Kyung-min; Rhonda Cator / Kate Wilson-Smith	7; 1	7; 1	7; 5
3	(South Korea) (Australia)	Seo Yoon-hee; Lenny Permana	7; 5	7; 2	7; 1
4	(South Korea) (Australia)	Hwang Yu-mi / Lee Hyo-jung; Kellie Lucas / Susan Wang	7; 2	7; 1	7; 2
5	(South Korea) (Australia)	Kim Kyeung-ran; Jane Crabtree	7; 1	7; 1	7; 0

Thailand
2
Altona Badminton Centre
21 February 2002, 14:00 UTC+11

Indonesia
3

			1	2	3	4	5
1	(Thailand) (Indonesia)	Sujitra Ekmongkolpaisarn; Lidya Djaelawijaya	8; 6	7; 2	7; 0
2	(Thailand) (Indonesia)	Duanganong Aroonkesorn / Kunchala Voravichitchaikul; Emma Ermawati / Vita Marissa	3; 7	7; 3	7; 5	1; 7	4; 7
3	(Thailand) (Indonesia)	Salakjit Ponsana; Ellen Angelina	3; 7	1; 7	0; 7
4	(Thailand) (Indonesia)	Sujitra Ekmongkolpaisarn / Saralee Thungthongkam; Deyana Lomban / Minarti Timur	7; 5	7; 0	8; 6
5	(Thailand) (Indonesia)	Nucharin Teekhatrakul; Dian Novita Sari	2; 7	3; 7	6; 8

Australia
2
Altona Badminton Centre
22 February 2002, 18:30 UTC+11

Thailand
3

			1	2	3	4	5
1	(Australia) (Thailand)	Rayoni Head; Sujitra Ekmongkolpaisarn	4; 7	2; 7	2; 7
2	(Australia) (Thailand)	Lenny Permana; Salakjit Ponsana	0; 7	7; 0	7; 4	2; 7	7; 2
3	(Australia) (Thailand)	Susan Wang; Nucharin Teekhatrakul	8; 6	3; 7	3; 7	3; 6
4	(Australia) (Thailand)	Rhonda Cator / Kate Wilson-Smith; Sathinee Chankrachangwong / Saralee Thungthongkam	3; 7	2; 7	7; 3	7; 3	1; 7
5	(Australia) (Thailand)	Kellie Lucas / Susan Wang; Duanganong Aroonkesorn / Kunchala Voravichitchaikul	5; 7	2; 7	1; 7

South Korea
5
Altona Badminton Centre
22 February 2002, 18:30 UTC+11

Indonesia
0

			1	2	3	4	5
1	(South Korea) (Indonesia)	Jun Jae-youn; Lidya Djaelawijaya	7; 2	7; 4	8; 6
2	(South Korea) (Indonesia)	Lee Kyung-won / Ra Kyung-min; Eny Erlangga / Jo Novita	7; 4	7; 2	7; 1
3	(South Korea) (Indonesia)	Seo Yoon-hee; Atu Rosalina	7; 3	5; 7	5; 7	7; 1	7; 3
4	(South Korea) (Indonesia)	Hwang Yu-mi / Lee Hyo-jung; Emma Ermawati / Vita Marissa	7; 8	3; 7	7; 1	7; 2	7; 2
5	(South Korea) (Indonesia)	Kim Kyeung-ran; Dian Novita Sari	7; 5	7; 2	7; 2

==== Group B ====
Pos	Team	Pld	W	L	MF	MA	MD	GF	GA	GD	PF	PA	PD	Pts	Qualification
1	Hong Kong	4	3	1	13	7	+6	44	30	+14	385	319	+66	3	Advance to Knockout stage
2	Japan	4	3	1	13	7	+6	48	24	+24	418	300	+118	3	Advance to Knockout stage
3	Singapore	4	3	1	12	8	+4	39	35	+4	368	365	+3	3	
4	Malaysia	4	1	3	7	13	−6	28	46	−18	314	407	−93	1	
5	Chinese Taipei	4	0	4	5	15	−10	23	47	−24	295	389	−94	0	

Source: Badminton Australia

Chinese Taipei
1
Altona Badminton Centre
20 February 2002, 09:00 UTC+11

Japan
4

			1	2	3	4	5
1	(Chinese Taipei) (Japan)	Chien Yu-chin; Kaori Mori	2; 7	3; 7	6; 8
2	(Chinese Taipei) (Japan)	Cheng Hsiao-yun / Cheng Pei-ju; Chikako Nakayama / Keiko Yoshitomi	1; 7	7; 8	0; 7
3	(Chinese Taipei) (Japan)	Huang Chia-chi; Kanako Yonekura	3; 7	0; 7	6; 8
4	(Chinese Taipei) (Japan)	Cheng Wen-hsing / Chien Yu-chin; Seiko Yamada / Shizuka Yamamoto	5; 7	8; 6	8; 7	8; 7
5	(Chinese Taipei) (Japan)	Chen Wan-ju; Miho Tanaka	7; 8	0; 7	2; 7

Hong Kong
2
Altona Badminton Centre
20 February 2002, 09:00 UTC+11

Singapore
3

			1	2	3	4	5
1	(Hong Kong) (Singapore)	Wang Chen; Liu Fan	7; 0	7; 2	7; 0
2	(Hong Kong) (Singapore)	Ling Wan Ting; Li Li	2; 7	6; 8	3; 7
3	(Hong Kong) (Singapore)	Koon Wai Chee; Xiao Luxi	7; 8	3; 7	5; 7
4	(Hong Kong) (Singapore)	Li Wing Mui / Ling Wan Ting; Liu Zhen / Xiao Luxi	7; 4	8; 7	1; 7	3; 7	2; 7
5	(Hong Kong) (Singapore)	Koon Wai Chee / Wang Chen; Jiang Yanmei / Fatimah Kumin Lim	7; 0	7; 1	7; 1

Malaysia
4
Altona Badminton Centre
20 February 2002, 15:00 UTC+11

Chinese Taipei
1

			1	2	3	4	5
1	(Malaysia) (Chinese Taipei)	Wong Mew Choo; Chien Yu-chin	7; 2	1; 7	7; 1	8; 7
2	(Malaysia) (Chinese Taipei)	Norhasikin Amin / Wong Pei Tty; Cheng Pei-ju / Cheng Shao-chieh	7; 1	7; 0	8; 7
3	(Malaysia) (Chinese Taipei)	Wong Miew Kheng; Huang Chia-chi	5; 7	1; 7	0; 7
4	(Malaysia) (Chinese Taipei)	Ang Li Peng / Lim Pek Siah; Cheng Wen-hsing / Chien Yu-chin	6; 8	7; 2	7; 3	1; 7	7; 5
5	(Malaysia) (Chinese Taipei)	Lee Yin Yin; Chen Wan-ju	7; 2	7; 3	7; 1

Singapore
2
Altona Badminton Centre
20 February 2002, 15:00 UTC+11

Japan
3

			1	2	3	4	5
1	(Singapore) (Japan)	Liu Fan; Kaori Mori	7; 8	0; 7	7; 0	1; 7
2	(Singapore) (Japan)	Li Li; Kanako Yonekura	7; 5	6; 8	2; 7	2; 7
3	(Singapore) (Japan)	Xiao Luxi; Miho Tanaka	3; 7	5; 7	7; 1	7; 2	8; 6
4	(Singapore) (Japan)	Jiang Yanmei / Fatimah Kumin Lim; Chikako Nakayama / Keiko Yoshitomi	7; 1	6; 8	7; 5	7; 4
5	(Singapore) (Japan)	Liu Zhen / Xiao Luxi; Seiko Yamada / Shizuka Yamamoto	3; 7	2; 7	7; 0	1; 7

Chinese Taipei
2
Altona Badminton Centre
21 February 2002, 10:00 UTC+11

Singapore
3

			1	2	3	4	5
1	(Chinese Taipei) (Singapore)	Huang Chia-chi; Liu Fan	7; 1	7; 1	7; 3
2	(Chinese Taipei) (Singapore)	Chen Wan-ju; Li Li	3; 7	1; 7	2; 7
3	(Chinese Taipei) (Singapore)	Huang Chia-hsin; Xiao Luxi	3; 7	1; 7	0; 7
4	(Chinese Taipei) (Singapore)	Cheng Shao-chieh / Chien Hsui-lin; Jiang Yanmei / Fatimah Kumin Lim	7; 4	7; 3	7; 1
5	(Chinese Taipei) (Singapore)	Cheng Wen-hsing / Chien Yu-chin; Liu Zhen / Xiao Luxi	7; 2	2; 7	7; 0	3; 7	5; 7

Malaysia
1
Altona Badminton Centre
21 February 2002, 10:00 UTC+11

Hong Kong
4

			1	2	3	4	5
1	(Malaysia) (Hong Kong)	Ng Mee Fen; Wang Chen	0; 7	0; 7	0; 7
2	(Malaysia) (Hong Kong)	Wong Mew Choo; Ling Wan Ting	3; 7	1; 7	6; 8
3	(Malaysia) (Hong Kong)	Lee Yin Yin; Koon Wai Chee	0; 7	2; 7	7; 4	1; 7
4	(Malaysia) (Hong Kong)	Ang Li Peng / Lim Pek Siah; Li Wing Mui / Ling Wan Ting	6; 8	0; 7	7; 3	7; 0	7; 1
5	(Malaysia) (Hong Kong)	Norhasikin Amin / Wong Pei Tty; Koon Wai Chee / Wang Chen	1; 7	7; 1	4; 7	7; 5	5; 7

Chinese Taipei
1
Altona Badminton Centre
21 February 2002, 18:30 UTC+11

Hong Kong
4

			1	2	3	4	5
1	(Chinese Taipei) (Hong Kong)	Chien Yu-chin; Wang Chen	1; 7	1; 7	1; 7
2	(Chinese Taipei) (Hong Kong)	Huang Chia-chi; Ling Wan Ting	3; 7	7; 2	4; 7	8; 6	6; 8
3	(Chinese Taipei) (Hong Kong)	Chiu Yi-luo; Koon Wai Chee	2; 7	2; 7	1; 7
4	(Chinese Taipei) (Hong Kong)	Cheng Wen-hsing / Chien Yu-chin; Li Wing Mui / Ling Wan Ting	4; 7	7; 0	7; 2	7; 0
5	(Chinese Taipei) (Hong Kong)	Cheng Shao-chieh / Chien Hsui-lin; Koon Wai Chee / Wang Chen	5; 7	7; 1	4; 7	0; 7

Malaysia
1
Altona Badminton Centre
21 February 2002, 18:30 UTC+11

Japan
4

			1	2	3	4	5
1	(Malaysia) (Japan)	Ng Mee Fen; Kaori Mori	1; 7	0; 7	3; 7
2	(Malaysia) (Japan)	Ang Li Peng / Lim Pek Siah; Seiko Yamada / Shizuka Yamamoto	2; 7	7; 2	8; 6	2; 7	7; 1
3	(Malaysia) (Japan)	Wong Mew Choo; Kanako Yonekura	4; 7	0; 7	0; 7
4	(Malaysia) (Japan)	Norhasikin Amin / Wong Pei Tty; Chikako Nakayama / Keiko Yoshitomi	0; 7	4; 7	0; 7
5	(Malaysia) (Japan)	Woon Sze Mei; Miho Tanaka	7; 8	5; 7	3; 7

Hong Kong
3
Altona Badminton Centre
22 February 2002, 14:00 UTC+11

Japan
2

			1	2	3	4	5
1	(Hong Kong) (Japan)	Wang Chen; Kaori Mori	3; 7	7; 4	3; 7	7; 0	7; 0
2	(Hong Kong) (Japan)	Ling Wan Ting; Kanako Yonekura	4; 7	7; 3	7; 4	7; 4
3	(Hong Kong) (Japan)	Koon Wai Chee; Miho Tanaka	1; 7	0; 7	0; 7
4	(Hong Kong) (Japan)	Li Wing Mui / Ling Wan Ting; Seiko Yamada / Shizuka Yamamoto	2; 7	0; 7	2; 7
5	(Hong Kong) (Japan)	Koon Wai Chee / Wang Chen; Chikako Nakayama / Keiko Yoshitomi	7; 6	7; 0	8; 7

Singapore
4
Altona Badminton Centre
22 February 2002, 14:00 UTC+11

Malaysia
1

			1	2	3	4	5
1	(Singapore) (Malaysia)	Liu Fan; Wong Mew Choo	8; 6	4; 7	7; 2	7; 0
2	(Singapore) (Malaysia)	Li Li; Woon Sze Mei	7; 2	1; 7	7; 5	7; 4
3	(Singapore) (Malaysia)	Xiao Luxi; Lee Yin Yin	3; 7	6; 8	0; 7
4	(Singapore) (Malaysia)	Jiang Yanmei / Fatimah Kumin Lim; Chin Eei Hui / Wong Pei Tty	8; 6	7; 1	1; 7	8; 7
5	(Singapore) (Malaysia)	Liu Zhen / Xiao Luxi; Ang Li Peng / Lim Pek Siah	7; 2	6; 8	7; 1	7; 1

=== Knockout stage ===
Semi-finals
South Korea	3
Japan	2
Indonesia	2
Hong Kong	3

Final
South Korea	3
Hong Kong	2
Third place
Japan	0
Indonesia	3

==== Semi-finals ====
South Korea
3
Altona Badminton Centre
23 February 2002, 18:30 UTC+1

Japan
2

			1	2	3	4	5
1	(South Korea) (Japan)	Jun Jae-youn; Kaori Mori	4; 7	4; 7	7; 3	7; 8
2	(South Korea) (Japan)	Lee Kyung-won / Ra Kyung-min; Seiko Yamada / Shizuka Yamamoto	8; 6	7; 3	7; 0
3	(South Korea) (Japan)	Seo Yoon-hee; Kanako Yonekura	7; 0	4; 7	2; 7	4; 7
4	(South Korea) (Japan)	Hwang Yu-mi / Joo Hyun-hee; Chikako Nakayama / Keiko Yoshitomi	7; 4	5; 7	7; 2	7; 3
5	(South Korea) (Japan)	Kim Kyeung-ran; Miho Tanaka	4; 7	7; 5	7; 1	7; 4

Hong Kong
3
Altona Badminton Centre
23 February 2002, 14:00 UTC+1

Indonesia
2

			1	2	3	4	5
1	(Hong Kong) (Indonesia)	Wang Chen; Atu Rosalina	7; 0	7; 0	7; 2
2	(Hong Kong) (Indonesia)	Ling Wan Ting; Ellen Angelina	4; 7	0; 7	7; 5	7; 3	7; 4
3	(Hong Kong) (Indonesia)	Siu Ching Man; Dian Novita Sari	5; 7	4; 7	0; 7
4	(Hong Kong) (Indonesia)	Li Wing Mui / Ling Wan Ting; Deyana Lomban / Vita Marissa	5; 7	1; 7	1; 7
5	(Hong Kong) (Indonesia)	Koon Wai Chee / Wang Chen; Eny Erlangga / Emma Ermawati	5; 7	7; 4	7; 2	7; 1

==== Third place ====
Indonesia
0
Altona Badminton Centre
24 February 2002, 11:00 UTC+1

Japan
3

			1	2	3	4	5
1	(Indonesia) (Japan)	Atu Rosalina; Kaori Mori	0; 7	0; 7	7; 8
2	(Indonesia) (Japan)	Eny Erlangga / Jo Novita; Seiko Yamada / Shizuka Yamamoto	6; 8	2; 7	5; 7
3	(Indonesia) (Japan)	Ellen Angelina; Kanako Yonekura	6; 8	2; 7	5; 7
4	(Indonesia) (Japan)	Emma Ermawati / Deyana Lomban; Tomomi Matsuda / Chikako Nakayama						not played
5	(Indonesia) (Japan)	Dian Novita Sari; Kyoko Komuro						not played

==== Final ====
Hong Kong
2
Altona Badminton Centre
24 February 2002, 14:30 UTC+1

South Korea
3

			1	2	3	4	5
1	(Hong Kong) (South Korea)	Wang Chen; Jun Jae-youn	3; 7	7; 3	7; 0	7; 3
2	(Hong Kong) (South Korea)	Ling Wan Ting; Lee Kyung-won	7; 0	1; 7	7; 5	0; 7	7; 4
3	(Hong Kong) (South Korea)	Koon Wai Chee; Seo Yoon-hee	4; 7	7; 0	0; 7	5; 7
4	(Hong Kong) (South Korea)	Li Wing Mui / Siu Ching Man; Hwang Yu-mi / Lee Hyo-jung	2; 7	1; 7	0; 7
5	(Hong Kong) (South Korea)	Koon Wai Chee / Wang Chen; Kim Kyeung-ran / Ra Kyung-min	0; 7	3; 7	7; 2	0; 7

== American Zone ==
The qualification rounds for the American Zone were held from 13 to 16 November 2001 at the Coliseo de la Ciudad Deportiva in Havana, Cuba. Four teams took part in the competition. The winner of the American Zone will advance to the second round of the European Zone in Eindhoven.

=== Round robin ===
Pos	Team	Pld	W	L	MF	MA	MD	GF	GA	GD	PF	PA	PD	Pts	Qualification
1	United States	3	3	0	12	3	+9	38	11	+27	296	155	+141	3	European Zone second round
2	Italy	3	2	1	10	5	+5	30	24	+6	295	229	+66	2	
3	Cuba	3	1	2	5	10	−5	32	23	+9	284	250	+34	1	
4	Barbados	3	0	3	0	15	−15	3	45	−42	91	332	−241	0	

Source: World Badminton

United States
3
Coliseo de la Ciudad Deportiva
13 November 2001, 09:00 UTC−5

Cuba
2

			1	2	3	4	5
1	(United States) (Cuba)	Mesinee Mangkalakiri; Dayanis Álvarez	7; 4	1; 7	6; 8	2; 7
2	(United States) (Cuba)	Meiluawati; Zaday Acosta	7; 2	7; 0	7; 0
3	(United States) (Cuba)	Elie Wu; Isaura Medina	7; 4	5; 7	1; 7	8; 6	7; 1
4	(United States) (Cuba)	Shannon Hsu / Joy Kitzmiller; Zaday Acosta / Dayanis Álvarez	2; 7	4; 7	7; 3	0; 7
5	(United States) (Cuba)	Meiluawati / Elie Wu; Yudelin Lazo / Dunia Bencomo	7; 0	7; 3	8; 7

Italy
5
Coliseo de la Ciudad Deportiva
13 November 2001, 09:00 UTC−5

Barbados
0

			1	2	3	4	5
1	(Italy) (Barbados)	Agnese Allegrini; Caroline Vaughn	7; 1	7; 0	7; 0
2	(Italy) (Barbados)	Erika Stich; Dionne Forde	5; 7	7; 1	7; 2	7; 3
3	(Italy) (Barbados)	Tanja Koleman; Mariama Eastmond	4; 7	7; 5	7; 2	7; 8	7; 1
4	(Italy) (Barbados)	Agnese Allegrini / Federica Panini; Mariama Eastmond / Dionne Forde	7; 5	7; 0	7; 3
5	(Italy) (Barbados)	Maria Luisa Mur / Erika Stich; Shakeira Waithe / Shari Watson	7; 1	7; 0	7; 1

United States
5
Coliseo de la Ciudad Deportiva
15 November 2001, 18:00 UTC−5

Barbados
0

			1	2	3	4	5
1	(United States) (Barbados)	Meiluawati; Caroline Vaughn	7; 0	7; 3	7; 0
2	(United States) (Barbados)	Elie Wu; Diane Forde	7; 0	7; 0	7; 1
3	(United States) (Barbados)	Joy Kitzmiller; Mariama Eastmond	7; 2	7; 3	7; 0
4	(United States) (Barbados)	Shannon Hsu / Elie Wu; Diane Forde / Shari Watson	7; 1	7; 3	7; 0
5	(United States) (Barbados)	Mesinee Mangkalakiri / Meiluawati; Lisa Chesseman / Mariama Eastmond	7; 0	7; 2	7; 1

Italy
4
Coliseo de la Ciudad Deportiva
15 November 2001, 18:00 UTC−5

Cuba
1

			1	2	3	4	5
1	(Italy) (Cuba)	Agnese Allegrini; Dayanis Álvarez	6; 8	7; 3	7; 1	7; 0
2	(Italy) (Cuba)	Erika Stich; Zaday Acosta	4; 7	7; 3	7; 0	7; 4
3	(Italy) (Cuba)	Maria Luisa Mur; Isaura Medina	5; 7	1; 7	5; 7
4	(Italy) (Cuba)	Agnese Allegrini / Federica Panini; Zaday Acosta / Dayanis Álvarez	7; 0	7; 2	5; 7	4; 7	7; 4
5	(Italy) (Cuba)	Maria Luisa Mur / Erika Stich; Yudelin Lazo / Isaura Medina	7; 4	7; 5	6; 8	2; 7	7; 0

Cuba
5
Coliseo de la Ciudad Deportiva
16 November 2001, 18:00 UTC−5

Barbados
0

			1	2	3	4	5
1	(Cuba) (Barbados)	Dayanis Álvarez; Caroline Vaughn	7; 0	7; 2	7; 4
2	(Cuba) (Barbados)	Isaura Medina; Dionne Forde	7; 2	7; 2	7; 0
3	(Cuba) (Barbados)	Yudelin Lazo; Mariama Eastmond	7; 0	7; 4	7; 0
4	(Cuba) (Barbados)	Yudelin Lazo / Dunia Bencomo; Mariama Eastmond / Dionne Forde	8; 7	7; 5	7; 0
5	(Cuba) (Barbados)	Dayanis Álvarez / Zaday Acosta; Shakeira Waithe / Shari Watson	7; 0	7; 2	7; 0

United States
4
Coliseo de la Ciudad Deportiva
17 November 2001, 15:00 UTC−5

Italy
1

			1	2	3	4	5
1	(United States) (Italy)	Mesinee Mangkalakiri; Agnese Allegrini	2; 7	3; 7	2; 7
2	(United States) (Italy)	Meiluawati; Federica Panini	7; 0	7; 1	7; 2
3	(United States) (Italy)	Elie Wu; Erika Stich	7; 4	7; 3	7; 2
4	(United States) (Italy)	Shannon Hsu / Elie Wu; Agnese Allegrini / Federica Panini	7; 5	7; 2	7; 2
5	(United States) (Italy)	Mesinee Mangkalakiri / Meiluawati; Maria Luisa Mur / Erika Stich	7; 4	7; 3	7; 3

== European Zone ==
The European Zone qualifying rounds were held from 17 to 24 February at the Indoor-Sportcentrum Eindhoven in Eindhoven, Netherlands.

=== First round ===
==== Group A ====
Pos	Team	Pld	W	L	MF	MA	MD	GF	GA	GD	PF	PA	PD	Pts	Qualification
1	Finland	3	3	0	13	2	+11	42	11	+31	334	182	+152	3	Advance to second round
2	France	3	2	1	12	3	+9	37	16	+21	317	207	+110	2	
3	Portugal	3	1	2	5	10	−5	22	32	−10	242	294	−52	1	
4	Latvia	3	0	3	0	15	−15	3	45	−42	121	331	−210	0	

Source: toernooi.nl

Finland
3
Indoor-Sportcentrum Eindhoven
17 February 2002, 11:00 UTC+1

France
2

			1	2	3	4	5
1	(Finland) (France)	Anu Weckström; Tatiana Vattier	7; 3	7; 5	7; 5
2	(Finland) (France)	Nina Weckström; Perrine Le Buhanic	7; 2	7; 3	7; 1
3	(Finland) (France)	Elina Väisänen; Élodie Eymard	7; 4	3; 7	5; 7	1; 7
4	(Finland) (France)	Anu Weckström / Nina Weckström; Victoria Hristova / Tatiana Vattier	8; 6	3; 7	8; 6	7; 1
5	(Finland) (France)	Katrine Rasmussen / Katja Ruohonen; Amélie Decelle / Élodie Eymard	7; 3	6; 8	7; 0	0; 7	2; 7

Portugal
5
Indoor-Sportcentrum Eindhoven
17 February 2002, 11:00 UTC+1

Latvia
0

			1	2	3	4	5
1	(Portugal) (Latvia)	Telma Santos; Kristīne Šefere	7; 4	7; 2	8; 6
2	(Portugal) (Latvia)	Tania Faria; Margarita Miķelsone	7; 4	7; 0	7; 0
3	(Portugal) (Latvia)	Francisca Pereira; Dace Šneidere	7; 0	7; 1	7; 0
4	(Portugal) (Latvia)	Vania Leça / Telma Santos; Margarita Miķelsone / Kristīne Šefere	7; 5	5; 7	3; 7	8; 6	7; 5
5	(Portugal) (Latvia)	Tania Faria / Francisca Pereira; Ilva Lineja / Dace Šneidere	7; 1	7; 2	7; 4

Portugal
0
Indoor-Sportcentrum Eindhoven
18 February 2002, 11:00 UTC+1

France
5

			1	2	3	4	5
1	(Portugal) (France)	Telma Santos; Tatiana Vattier	3; 7	1; 7	0; 7
2	(Portugal) (France)	Tania Faria; Perrine Le Buhanic	3; 7	7; 2	7; 8	7; 5	2; 7
3	(Portugal) (France)	Francisca Pereira; Élodie Eymard	2; 7	7; 4	0; 7	5; 7
4	(Portugal) (France)	Vania Leça / Telma Santos; Victoria Hristova / Tatiana Vattier	3; 7	4; 7	3; 7
5	(Portugal) (France)	Tania Faria / Francisca Pereira; Amélie Decelle / Élodie Eymard	7; 5	3; 7	0; 7	0; 7

Finland
5
Indoor-Sportcentrum Eindhoven
18 February 2002, 11:00 UTC+1

Latvia
0

			1	2	3	4	5
1	(Finland) (Latvia)	Anu Weckström; Kristīne Šefere	7; 2	7; 1	7; 0
2	(Finland) (Latvia)	Nina Weckström; Margarita Miķelsone	7; 4	7; 1	5; 7	7; 3
3	(Finland) (Latvia)	Elina Väisänen; Dace Šneidere	7; 2	7; 0	7; 4
4	(Finland) (Latvia)	Anu Weckström / Nina Weckström; Margarita Miķelsone / Kristīne Šefere	7; 0	7; 0	7; 0
5	(Finland) (Latvia)	Katrine Rasmussen / Katja Ruohonen; Ilva Lineja / Dace Šneidere	7; 5	7; 1	7; 0

France
5
Indoor-Sportcentrum Eindhoven
19 February 2002, 11:00 UTC+1

Latvia
0

			1	2	3	4	5
1	(France) (Latvia)	Tatiana Vattier; Kristīne Šefere	7; 3	7; 4	7; 3
2	(France) (Latvia)	Perrine Le Buhanic; Margarita Miķelsone	7; 4	8; 6	7; 4
3	(France) (Latvia)	Élodie Eymard; Olva Gerasimova	7; 4	7; 2	7; 1
4	(France) (Latvia)	Amélie Decelle / Victoria Hristova; Margarita Miķelsone / Kristīne Šefere	7; 0	7; 1	7; 1
5	(France) (Latvia)	Aurélie Bréard / Élodie Eymard; Ilva Lineja / Dace Šneidere	7; 3	7; 1	7; 0

Finland
5
Indoor-Sportcentrum Eindhoven
19 February 2002, 11:00 UTC+1

Portugal
0

			1	2	3	4	5
1	(Finland) (Portugal)	Anu Weckström; Telma Santos	1; 7	7; 0	7; 0	7; 0
2	(Finland) (Portugal)	Nina Weckström; Tania Faria	7; 4	7; 1	7; 5
3	(Finland) (Portugal)	Elina Väisänen; Vania Leça	7; 3	7; 8	8; 6	8; 6
4	(Finland) (Portugal)	Anu Weckström / Nina Weckström; Tania Faria / Telma Santos	2; 7	7; 1	7; 3	7; 2
5	(Finland) (Portugal)	Katrine Rasmussen / Katja Ruohonen; Vania Leça / Francisca Pereira	8; 6	7; 0	7; 4

==== Group B ====
Pos	Team	Pld	W	L	MF	MA	MD	GF	GA	GD	PF	PA	PD	Pts	Qualification
1	Russia	3	3	0	15	0	+15	45	3	+42	327	107	+220	3	Advance to second round
2	Slovenia	3	2	1	8	7	+1	27	26	+1	270	271	−1	2	
3	Spain	3	1	2	4	11	−7	17	37	−20	205	322	−117	1	
4	Czech Republic	3	0	3	3	12	−9	15	38	−23	215	317	−102	0	

Source: toernooi.nl

Slovenia
4
Indoor-Sportcentrum Eindhoven
17 February 2002, 18:15 UTC+1

Czech Republic
1

			1	2	3	4	5
1	(Slovenia) (Czech Republic)	Maja Pohar; Eva Brožová	7; 4	7; 0	7; 2
2	(Slovenia) (Czech Republic)	Maja Tvrdy; Hana Milisová	5; 7	8; 6	7; 3	7; 2
3	(Slovenia) (Czech Republic)	Maja Kersnik; Diana Stadníková	8; 6	6; 8	8; 6	7; 4
4	(Slovenia) (Czech Republic)	Maja Pohar / Maja Tvrdy; Eva Brožová / Hana Milisová	2; 7	7; 3	8; 6	7; 2
5	(Slovenia) (Czech Republic)	Maja Kersnik / Urška Silvester; Hana Procházková / Ivana Vilímková	1; 7	2; 7	7; 4	5; 7

Russia
5
Indoor-Sportcentrum Eindhoven
17 February 2002, 18:15 UTC+1

Spain
0

			1	2	3	4	5
1	(Russia) (Spain)	Elena Sukhareva; Dolores Marco	3; 7	7; 0	7; 1	7; 2
2	(Russia) (Spain)	Anastasia Russkikh; Yoana Martínez	4; 7	7; 4	7; 1	7; 3
3	(Russia) (Spain)	Ekaterina Ananina; Lucía Tavera	7; 4	7; 5	7; 0
4	(Russia) (Spain)	Irina Ruslyakova / Marina Yakusheva; Yoana Martínez / Lucía Tavera	7; 1	7; 1	7; 0
5	(Russia) (Spain)	Ekaterina Ananina / Anastasia Russkikh; Dolores Marco / Patricia Pérez	7; 0	7; 0	7; 3

Russia
5
Indoor-Sportcentrum Eindhoven
18 February 2002, 18:00 UTC+1

Czech Republic
0

			1	2	3	4	5
1	(Russia) (Czech Republic)	Elena Sukhareva; Hana Procházková	7; 1	7; 0	7; 0
2	(Russia) (Czech Republic)	Anastasia Russkikh; Hana Milisová	7; 4	7; 0	7; 4
3	(Russia) (Czech Republic)	Ekaterina Ananina; Diana Stadníková	7; 3	7; 5	7; 5
4	(Russia) (Czech Republic)	Irina Ruslyakova / Marina Yakusheva; Eva Brožová / Hana Milisová	4; 7	7; 0	7; 3	7; 1
5	(Russia) (Czech Republic)	Ekaterina Ananina / Anastasia Russkikh; Hana Procházková / Ivana Vilímková	7; 0	7; 0	7; 2

Slovenia
4
Indoor-Sportcentrum Eindhoven
18 February 2002, 18:00 UTC+1

Spain
1

			1	2	3	4	5
1	(Slovenia) (Spain)	Maja Pohar; Dolores Marco	6; 8	7; 3	7; 2	2; 7	4; 7
2	(Slovenia) (Spain)	Maja Tvrdy; Yoana Martínez	7; 2	7; 1	7; 0
3	(Slovenia) (Spain)	Urška Silvester; Lucía Tavera	8; 6	8; 7	7; 2
4	(Slovenia) (Spain)	Maja Pohar / Maja Tvrdy; Yoana Martínez / Lucía Tavera	7; 2	4; 7	7; 3	7; 0
5	(Slovenia) (Spain)	Maja Kersnik / Urška Silvester; Dolores Marco / Patricia Pérez	7; 4	5; 7	7; 4	7; 2

Czech Republic
2
Indoor-Sportcentrum Eindhoven
19 February 2002, 18:00 UTC+1

Spain
3

			1	2	3	4	5
1	(Czech Republic) (Spain)	Hana Procházková; Dolores Marco	5; 7	3; 7	1; 7
2	(Czech Republic) (Spain)	Hana Milisová; Yoana Martínez	2; 7	1; 7	4; 7
3	(Czech Republic) (Spain)	Hana Procházková / Ivana Vilímková; Cristina Hernández / Patricia Pérez	7; 2	7; 2	7; 4
4	(Czech Republic) (Spain)	Diana Stadníková; Lucía Tavera	1; 7	7; 4	7; 1	7; 1
5	(Czech Republic) (Spain)	Eva Brožová / Hana Milisová; Yoana Martínez / Dolores Marco	7; 8	7; 3	7; 3	2; 7	7; 8

Slovenia
0
Indoor-Sportcentrum Eindhoven
19 February 2002, 18:00 UTC+1

Russia
5

			1	2	3	4	5
1	(Slovenia) (Russia)	Maja Pohar; Elena Sukhareva	4; 7	0; 7	3; 7
2	(Slovenia) (Russia)	Maja Tvrdy; Anastasia Russkikh	6; 8	2; 7	1; 7
3	(Slovenia) (Russia)	Urška Silvester; Ekaterina Ananina	4; 7	2; 7	1; 7
4	(Slovenia) (Russia)	Urška Silvester / Maja Tvrdy; Irina Ruslyakova / Marina Yakusheva	2; 7	1; 7	0; 7
5	(Slovenia) (Russia)	Maja Kersnik / Maja Pohar; Ekaterina Ananina / Anastasia Russkikh	1; 7	3; 7	3; 7

==== Group C ====
Pos	Team	Pld	W	L	MF	MA	MD	GF	GA	GD	PF	PA	PD	Pts	Qualification
1	India	3	3	0	15	0	+15	45	6	+39	346	169	+177	3	Advance to second round
2	Belarus	3	2	1	10	5	+5	33	17	+16	284	205	+79	2	
3	Norway	3	1	2	3	12	−9	15	40	−25	221	331	−110	1	
4	Ireland	3	0	3	2	13	−11	11	41	−30	184	330	−146	0	

Source: toernooi.nl

India
5
Indoor-Sportcentrum Eindhoven
17 February 2002, 14:30 UTC+1

Belarus
0

			1	2	3	4	5
1	(India) (Belarus)	Aparna Popat; Nadezhda Kostiouchyk	7; 4	3; 7	7; 0	2; 7	8; 6
2	(India) (Belarus)	Trupti Murgunde; Vlada Chernyavskaya	7; 2	7; 5	7; 5
3	(India) (Belarus)	P. V. V. Lakshmi; Maria Kizil	7; 2	5; 7	7; 2	7; 2
4	(India) (Belarus)	Jwala Gutta / Shruti Kurien; Nadezhda Kostiouchyk / Vlada Chernyavskaya	7; 2	7; 3	7; 5
5	(India) (Belarus)	Madhumita Bisht / P. V. V. Lakshmi; Olga Konon / Maria Kizil	7; 3	7; 1	7; 1

Norway
3
Indoor-Sportcentrum Eindhoven
17 February 2002, 14:30 UTC+1

Ireland
2

			1	2	3	4	5
1	(Norway) (Republic of Ireland)	Helene Abusdal; Bing Huang	1; 7	4; 7	6; 8
2	(Norway) (Republic of Ireland)	Monica Halvorsen; Keelin Fox	5; 7	2; 7	7; 2	7; 2	7; 0
3	(Norway) (Republic of Ireland)	Helene Abusdal / Camilla Wright; Fiona Glennon / Pauline Glennon	7; 1	7; 0	8; 6
4	(Norway) (Republic of Ireland)	Sara Blengsli Kværnø; Claire Henderson	7; 0	4; 7	5; 7	7; 4	7; 8
5	(Norway) (Republic of Ireland)	Monica Halvorsen / Gry Kirsti Skjønhaug; Keelin Fox / Bing Huang	0; 7	7; 0	3; 7	7; 4	7; 5

Norway
0
Indoor-Sportcentrum Eindhoven
18 February 2002, 14:30 UTC+1

Belarus
5

			1	2	3	4	5
1	(Norway) (Belarus)	Helene Abusdal; Nadezhda Kostiouchyk	2; 7	1; 7	2; 7
2	(Norway) (Belarus)	Monica Halvorsen; Vlada Chernyavskaya	1; 7	1; 7	4; 7
3	(Norway) (Belarus)	Sara Blengsli Kværnø; Maria Kizil	2; 7	2; 7	0; 7
4	(Norway) (Belarus)	Monica Halvorsen / Gry Kirsti Skjønhaug; Nadezhda Kostiouchyk / Vlada Chernyavskaya	0; 7	1; 7	1; 7
5	(Norway) (Belarus)	Helene Abusdal / Camilla Wright; Maria Kizil / Olga Konon	5; 7	8; 6	6; 8	4; 7

India
5
Indoor-Sportcentrum Eindhoven
18 February 2002, 14:30 UTC+1

Ireland
0

			1	2	3	4	5
1	(India) (Republic of Ireland)	Aparna Popat; Bing Huang	8; 7	7; 3	7; 1
2	(India) (Republic of Ireland)	Trupti Murgunde; Keelin Fox	7; 3	7; 2	7; 3
3	(India) (Republic of Ireland)	Madhumita Bisht / Neelima Choudhary; Fiona Glennon / Pauline Glennon	7; 0	7; 3	7; 3
4	(India) (Republic of Ireland)	P. V. V. Lakshmi; Claire Henderson	7; 1	7; 0	7; 3
5	(India) (Republic of Ireland)	Jwala Gutta / Shruti Kurien; Keelin Fox / Bing Huang	7; 3	7; 1	8; 6

Belarus
5
Indoor-Sportcentrum Eindhoven
19 February 2002, 14:30 UTC+1

Ireland
0

			1	2	3	4	5
1	(Belarus) (Republic of Ireland)	Nadezhda Kostiouchyk; Bing Huang	7; 4	7; 5	7; 1
2	(Belarus) (Republic of Ireland)	Vlada Chernyavskaya; Keelin Fox	1; 7	7; 1	7; 4	7; 1
3	(Belarus) (Republic of Ireland)	Maria Kizil; Claire Henderson	7; 2	7; 4	7; 2
4	(Belarus) (Republic of Ireland)	Nadezhda Kostiouchyk / Vlada Chernyavskaya; Bing Huang / Keelin Fox	7; 1	8; 6	7; 1
5	(Belarus) (Republic of Ireland)	Maria Kizil / Olga Konon; Fiona Glennon / Pauline Glennon	7; 2	8; 7	7; 1

India
5
Indoor-Sportcentrum Eindhoven
19 February 2002, 14:30 UTC+1

Norway
0

			1	2	3	4	5
1	(India) (Norway)	Aparna Popat; Helene Abusdal	7; 0	7; 1	7; 1
2	(India) (Norway)	Trupti Murgunde; Monica Halvorsen	8; 6	8; 6	8; 7
3	(India) (Norway)	C. H. Deepti / D. Shweta; Helene Abusdal / Camilla Wright	7; 5	7; 8	7; 3	7; 3
4	(India) (Norway)	Neelima Choudhary; Sara Blengsli Kværnø	5; 7	7; 2	7; 3	3; 7	7; 2
5	(India) (Norway)	Madhumita Bisht / P. V. V. Lakshmi; Monica Halvorsen / Gry Kirsti Skjønhaug	7; 1	7; 3	7; 1

==== Group D ====
Pos	Team	Pld	W	L	MF	MA	MD	GF	GA	GD	PF	PA	PD	Pts	Qualification
1	Ukraine	3	3	0	15	0	+15	45	8	+37	354	155	+199	3	Advance to second round
2	Belgium	3	2	1	7	8	−1	26	27	−1	253	266	−13	2	
3	Switzerland	3	1	2	6	9	−3	21	28	−7	225	279	−54	1	
4	Austria	3	0	3	2	13	−11	12	41	−29	210	342	−132	0	

Source: toernooi.nl

Austria
1
Indoor-Sportcentrum Eindhoven
17 February 2002, 18:15 UTC+1

Belgium
4

			1	2	3	4	5
1	(Austria) (Belgium)	Simone Prutsch; Nathalie Descamps	3; 7	7; 3	1; 7	7; 5	1; 7
2	(Austria) (Belgium)	Sabine Franz; Elke Biesbrouck	6; 8	3; 7	3; 7
3	(Austria) (Belgium)	Tina Riedl; Evy Descamps	2; 7	3; 7	5; 7
4	(Austria) (Belgium)	Verena Fastenbauer / Karina Lengauer; Nathalie Descamps / Sofie Robbrecht	7; 5	7; 4	4; 7	4; 7	7; 4
5	(Austria) (Belgium)	Sabine Franz / Simone Prutsch; Elke Biesbrouck / Evy Descamps	2; 7	2; 7	5; 7

Ukraine
5
Indoor-Sportcentrum Eindhoven
17 February 2002, 18:15 UTC+1

Switzerland
0

			1	2	3	4	5
1	(Ukraine) (Switzerland)	Elena Nozdran; Petra Kretzer	7; 0	7; 0	7; 1
2	(Ukraine) (Switzerland)	Natalia Golovkina; Jasmin Pang	7; 3	7; 3	7; 2
3	(Ukraine) (Switzerland)	Larisa Griga; Judith Baumeyer	7; 2	7; 5	7; 5
4	(Ukraine) (Switzerland)	Natalja Esipenko / Elena Nozdran; Judith Baumeyer / Santi Wibowo	7; 8	7; 4	7; 1	7; 2
5	(Ukraine) (Switzerland)	Natalia Golovkina / Larisa Griga; Fabienne Baumeyer / Farha Razi	8; 7	4; 7	7; 2	7; 1

Austria
1
Indoor-Sportcentrum Eindhoven
18 February 2002, 14:30 UTC+1

Switzerland
4

			1	2	3	4	5
1	(Austria) (Switzerland)	Simone Prutsch; Santi Wibowo	5; 7	2; 7	1; 7
2	(Austria) (Switzerland)	Sabine Franz; Jasmin Pang	5; 7	7; 3	3; 7	6; 8
3	(Austria) (Switzerland)	Verena Fastenbauer; Judith Baumeyer	1; 7	3; 7	5; 7
4	(Austria) (Switzerland)	Simone Prutsch / Tina Riedl; Fabienne Baumeyer / Farha Razi	8; 7	7; 2	8; 6
5	(Austria) (Switzerland)	Verena Fastenbauer / Karina Lengauer; Judith Baumeyer / Santi Wibowo	5; 7	6; 8	5; 7

Ukraine
5
Indoor-Sportcentrum Eindhoven
18 February 2002, 18:00 UTC+1

Belgium
0

			1	2	3	4	5
1	(Ukraine) (Belgium)	Elena Nozdran; Nathalie Descamps	7; 0	7; 0	7; 0
2	(Ukraine) (Belgium)	Natalia Golovkina; Elke Biesbrouck	7; 0	7; 6	4; 7	8; 6
3	(Ukraine) (Belgium)	Larisa Griga; Evy Descamps	7; 1	7; 1	7; 2
4	(Ukraine) (Belgium)	Natalja Esipenko / Natalia Golovkina; Elke Biesbrouck / Evy Descamps	7; 5	7; 3	6; 8	3; 7	7; 1
5	(Ukraine) (Belgium)	Larisa Griga / Elena Nozdran; Nathalie Descamps / Sofie Robbrecht	7; 0	7; 1	7; 0

Austria
0
Indoor-Sportcentrum Eindhoven
19 February 2002, 18:00 UTC+1

Ukraine
5

			1	2	3	4	5
1	(Austria) (Ukraine)	Simone Prutsch; Elena Nozdran	3; 7	0; 7	0; 7
2	(Austria) (Ukraine)	Sabine Franz; Natalia Golovkina	7; 8	1; 7	0; 7
3	(Austria) (Ukraine)	Verena Fastenbauer; Larisa Griga	2; 7	0; 7	4; 7
4	(Austria) (Ukraine)	Verena Fastenbauer / Karina Lengauer; Natalja Esipenko / Natalia Golovkina	7; 2	6; 8	3; 7	7; 3	0; 7
5	(Austria) (Ukraine)	Simone Prutsch / Tina Riedl; Larisa Griga / Elena Nozdran	2; 7	8; 6	4; 7	0; 7

Belgium
3
Indoor-Sportcentrum Eindhoven
19 February 2002, 18:00 UTC+1

Switzerland
2

			1	2	3	4	5
1	(Belgium) (Switzerland)	Nathalie Descamps; Santi Wibowo	4; 7	7; 0	7; 3	7; 4
2	(Belgium) (Switzerland)	Elke Biesbrouck; Petra Kretzer	7; 3	7; 0	7; 5
3	(Belgium) (Switzerland)	Evy Descamps; Jasmin Pang	4; 7	0; 7	3; 7
4	(Belgium) (Switzerland)	Nathalie Descamps / Sofie Robbrecht; Santi Wibowo / Farha Razi	3; 7	5; 7	3; 7
5	(Belgium) (Switzerland)	Elke Biesbrouck / Evy Descamps; Judith Baumeyer / Fabienne Baumeyer	7; 2	7; 1	7; 1

==== Group E ====
Pos	Team	Pld	W	L	MF	MA	MD	GF	GA	GD	PF	PA	PD	Pts	Qualification
1	Bulgaria	3	3	0	15	0	+15	45	2	+43	328	97	+231	3	Advance to second round
2	Iceland	3	2	1	8	7	+1	25	25	0	252	239	+13	2	
3	Hungary	3	1	2	5	10	−5	18	33	−15	201	289	−88	1	
4	Sri Lanka	3	0	3	2	13	−11	11	39	−28	150	306	−156	0	

Source: toernooi.nl

Bulgaria
5
Indoor-Sportcentrum Eindhoven
17 February 2002, 11:00 UTC+1

Sri Lanka
0

			1	2	3	4	5
1	(Bulgaria) (Sri Lanka)	Petya Nedelcheva; Chandrika de Silva	7; 1	7; 0	7; 2
2	(Bulgaria) (Sri Lanka)	Neli Boteva; Thilini Jayasinghe	7; 4	7; 0	7; 2
3	(Bulgaria) (Sri Lanka)	Dimitriika Dimitrova; Sureni Nandasiri	7; 0	7; 0	7; 1
4	(Bulgaria) (Sri Lanka)	Neli Boteva / Petya Nedelcheva; Sriyani Deepika / Chandrika de Silva	7; 1	7; 0	7; 4
5	(Bulgaria) (Sri Lanka)	Diana Dimova / Maya Ivanova; Nadeesha Gayanthi / Sureni Nandasiri	7; 2	7; 1	7; 0

Hungary
1
Indoor-Sportcentrum Eindhoven
17 February 2002, 11:00 UTC+1

Iceland
4

			1	2	3	4	5
1	(Hungary) (Iceland)	Krisztina Ádám; Ragna Ingólfsdóttir	3; 7	8; 6	3; 7	4; 7
2	(Hungary) (Iceland)	Sarolta Varga; Sara Jónsdóttir	1; 7	0; 7	1; 7
3	(Hungary) (Iceland)	Csilla Fórián; Katrín Atladóttir	7; 3	7; 5	7; 3
4	(Hungary) (Iceland)	Krisztina Ádám / Csilla Fórián; Vigdís Ásgeirsdóttir / Ragna Ingólfsdóttir	8; 6	1; 7	1; 7	5; 7
5	(Hungary) (Iceland)	Zsófia Kovács / Zsuzsa Kovács; Katrín Atladóttir / Sara Jónsdóttir	3; 7	3; 7	4; 7

Hungary
4
Indoor-Sportcentrum Eindhoven
18 February 2002, 11:00 UTC+1

Sri Lanka
1

			1	2	3	4	5
1	(Hungary) (Sri Lanka)	Krisztina Ádám; Chandrika de Silva	3; 7	0; 7	2; 7
2	(Hungary) (Sri Lanka)	Sarolta Varga; Thilini Jayasinghe	7; 2	7; 4	5; 7	1; 7	8; 6
3	(Hungary) (Sri Lanka)	Csilla Fórián; Sureni Nandasiri	7; 0	7; 0	7; 0
4	(Hungary) (Sri Lanka)	Zsófia Kovács / Zsuzsa Kovács; Tharaka Abeywickrema / Nadeesha Gayanthi	2; 7	7; 3	7; 1	7; 1
5	(Hungary) (Sri Lanka)	Krisztina Ádám / Csilla Fórián; Sriyani Deepika / Chandrika de Silva	8; 7	7; 5	7; 0

Bulgaria
5
Indoor-Sportcentrum Eindhoven
18 February 2002, 11:00 UTC+1

Iceland
0

			1	2	3	4	5
1	(Bulgaria) (Iceland)	Petya Nedelcheva; Ragna Ingólfsdóttir	7; 0	7; 3	7; 1
2	(Bulgaria) (Iceland)	Neli Boteva; Sara Jónsdóttir	7; 2	7; 1	7; 1
3	(Bulgaria) (Iceland)	Dimitriika Dimitrova; Katrín Atladóttir	5; 7	7; 3	7; 3	7; 0
4	(Bulgaria) (Iceland)	Neli Boteva / Petya Nedelcheva; Vigdís Ásgeirsdóttir / Ragna Ingólfsdóttir	7; 4	7; 0	8; 6
5	(Bulgaria) (Iceland)	Diana Dimova / Maya Ivanova; Katrín Atladóttir / Sara Jónsdóttir	7; 4	7; 2	8; 6

Sri Lanka
1
Indoor-Sportcentrum Eindhoven
19 February 2002, 11:00 UTC+1

Iceland
4

			1	2	3	4	5
1	(Sri Lanka) (Iceland)	Chandrika de Silva; Ragna Ingólfsdóttir	4; 7	5; 7	1; 7
2	(Sri Lanka) (Iceland)	Thilini Jayasinghe; Sara Jónsdóttir	7; 2	7; 5	4; 7	1; 7	0; 7
3	(Sri Lanka) (Iceland)	Nadeesha Gayanthi; Katrín Atladóttir	7; 4	7; 4	7; 3
4	(Sri Lanka) (Iceland)	Sriyani Deepika / Chandrika de Silva; Vigdís Ásgeirsdóttir / Ragna Ingólfsdóttir	2; 7	2; 7	5; 7
5	(Sri Lanka) (Iceland)	Nadeesha Gayanthi / Sureni Nandasiri; Katrín Atladóttir / Sara Jónsdóttir	2; 7	0; 7	0; 7

Bulgaria
5
Indoor-Sportcentrum Eindhoven
19 February 2002, 11:00 UTC+1

Hungary
0

			1	2	3	4	5
1	(Bulgaria) (Hungary)	Petya Nedelcheva; Krisztina Ádám	7; 4	7; 2	7; 1
2	(Bulgaria) (Hungary)	Neli Boteva; Sarolta Varga	7; 0	7; 0	7; 0
3	(Bulgaria) (Hungary)	Dimitriika Dimitrova; Csilla Fórián	7; 3	8; 7	7; 3
4	(Bulgaria) (Hungary)	Diana Dimova / Maya Ivanova; Zsófia Kovács / Zsuzsa Kovács	4; 7	7; 1	7; 1	8; 6
5	(Bulgaria) (Hungary)	Neli Boteva / Petya Nedelcheva; Krisztina Ádám / Csilla Fórián	7; 0	7; 0	7; 1

=== Second round ===
==== Group W ====
Pos	Team	Pld	W	L	MF	MA	MD	GF	GA	GD	PF	PA	PD	Pts	Qualification
1	Denmark	3	3	0	15	0	+15	45	1	+44	317	68	+249	3	Advance to Knockout stage
2	Scotland	3	2	1	7	8	−1	27	24	+3	240	240	0	2	
3	Finland	3	1	2	6	9	−3	18	33	−15	205	290	−85	1	
4	Peru	3	0	3	2	13	−11	8	40	−32	137	301	−164	0	

Source: toernooi.nl

Denmark
5
Indoor-Sportcentrum Eindhoven
20 February 2002, 11:00 UTC+1

Scotland
0

			1	2	3	4	5
1	(Denmark) (Scotland)	Camilla Martin; Susan Hughes	7; 0	7; 0	7; 0
2	(Denmark) (Scotland)	Tine Rasmussen; Fiona Sneddon	7; 1	7; 0	7; 0
3	(Denmark) (Scotland)	Christina Sørensen; Kirsteen McEwan	2; 7	7; 3	7; 1	7; 3
4	(Denmark) (Scotland)	Pernille Harder / Mette Schjoldager; Sandra Watt / Yuan Wemyss	7; 0	7; 3	7; 2
5	(Denmark) (Scotland)	Jane Bramsen / Ann-Lou Jørgensen; Kirsteen McEwan / Elinor Middlemiss	7; 3	7; 4	7; 3

Peru
1
Indoor-Sportcentrum Eindhoven
20 February 2002, 11:00 UTC+1

Finland
4

			1	2	3	4	5
1	(Peru) (Finland)	Lorena Blanco; Anu Weckström	3; 7	3; 7	6; 8
2	(Peru) (Finland)	Sandra Jimeno; Nina Weckström	7; 2	8; 6	7; 0
3	(Peru) (Finland)	Valeria Rivero; Elina Väisänen	7; 1	5; 7	1; 7	5; 7
4	(Peru) (Finland)	Ximena Bellido / Lorena Blanco; Anu Weckström / Nina Weckström	2; 7	4; 7	1; 7
5	(Peru) (Finland)	Sandra Jimeno / Doriana Rivera; Katrine Rasmussen / Katja Ruohonen	4; 7	7; 4	3; 7	0; 7

Peru
1
Indoor-Sportcentrum Eindhoven
21 February 2002, 11:00 UTC+1

Scotland
4

			1	2	3	4	5
1	(Peru) (Scotland)	Lorena Blanco; Susan Hughes	4; 7	0; 7	5; 7
2	(Peru) (Scotland)	Sandra Jimeno; Fiona Sneddon	0; 7	7; 4	7; 2	7; 1
3	(Peru) (Scotland)	Valeria Rivero; Yuan Wemyss	2; 7	2; 7	0; 7
4	(Peru) (Scotland)	Sandra Jimeno / Doriana Rivera; Kirsteen McEwan / Elinor Middlemiss	2; 7	3; 7	2; 7
5	(Peru) (Scotland)	Ximena Bellido / Lorena Blanco; Sandra Watt / Yuan Wemyss	0; 7	3; 7	0; 7

Denmark
5
Indoor-Sportcentrum Eindhoven
21 February 2002, 11:00 UTC+1

Finland
0

			1	2	3	4	5
1	(Denmark) (Finland)	Camilla Martin; Nina Weckström	7; 1	7; 1	7; 0
2	(Denmark) (Finland)	Tine Rasmussen; Elina Väisänen	7; 0	7; 3	7; 4
3	(Denmark) (Finland)	Anne Marie Pedersen; Katja Ruohonen	7; 0	7; 0	7; 0
4	(Denmark) (Finland)	Rikke Olsen / Majken Vange; Elina Väisänen / Nina Weckström	7; 0	7; 0	7; 2
5	(Denmark) (Finland)	Jane Bramsen / Ann-Lou Jørgensen; Katrine Rasmussen / Katja Ruohonen	7; 2	7; 3	7; 2

Scotland
3
Indoor-Sportcentrum Eindhoven
22 February 2002, 11:00 UTC+1

Finland
2

			1	2	3	4	5
1	(Scotland) (Finland)	Susan Hughes; Anu Weckström	7; 5	7; 5	4; 7	4; 7	2; 7
2	(Scotland) (Finland)	Fiona Sneddon; Nina Weckström	7; 3	7; 5	3; 7	3; 7	3; 7
3	(Scotland) (Finland)	Yuan Wemyss; Elina Väisänen	8; 7	7; 2	7; 3
4	(Scotland) (Finland)	Kirsteen McEwan / Elinor Middlemiss; Katrine Rasmussen / Katja Ruohonen	7; 0	7; 5	8; 6
5	(Scotland) (Finland)	Sandra Watt / Yuan Wemyss; Anu Weckström / Nina Weckström	7; 4	7; 2	7; 0

Denmark
5
Indoor-Sportcentrum Eindhoven
22 February 2002, 11:00 UTC+1

Peru
0

			1	2	3	4	5
1	(Denmark) (Peru)	Tine Rasmussen; Lorena Blanco	7; 0	7; 2	7; 3
2	(Denmark) (Peru)	Christina Sørensen; Sandra Jimeno	7; 0	7; 2	7; 2
3	(Denmark) (Peru)	Rikke Olsen / Majken Vange; Ximena Bellido / Lorena Blanco	7; 3	7; 1	7; 1
4	(Denmark) (Peru)	Anne Marie Pedersen; Valeria Rivero	7; 1	7; 0	7; 0
5	(Denmark) (Peru)	Pernille Harder / Mette Schjoldager; Sandra Jimeno / Doriana Rivera	7; 2	7; 2	7; 1

==== Group X ====
Pos	Team	Pld	W	L	MF	MA	MD	GF	GA	GD	PF	PA	PD	Pts	Qualification
1	England	3	3	0	11	4	+7	36	17	+19	307	210	+97	3	Advance to Knockout stage
2	Russia	3	2	1	11	4	+7	36	16	+20	320	201	+119	2	
3	United States	3	1	2	4	11	−7	13	34	−21	151	282	−131	1	
4	Wales	3	0	3	4	11	−7	15	33	−18	174	259	−85	0	

Source: toernooi.nl

United States
3
Indoor-Sportcentrum Eindhoven
20 February 2002, 14:30 UTC+1

Wales
2

			1	2	3	4	5
1	(United States) (Wales)	Meiluawati; Kelly Morgan	0; 7	1; 7	0; 7
2	(United States) (Wales)	Mesinee Mangkalakiri; Kate Ridler	7; 5	7; 3	7; 5
3	(United States) (Wales)	Elie Wu; Katie Howell	7; 0	7; 1	7; 1
4	(United States) (Wales)	Shannon Hsu / Joy Kitzmiller; Felicity Gallup / Joanne Muggeridge	0; 7	0; 7	1; 7
5	(United States) (Wales)	Mesinee Mangkalakiri / Elie Wu; Robyn Ashworth / Kate Ridler	8; 6	7; 0	7; 0

England
3
Indoor-Sportcentrum Eindhoven
20 February 2002, 14:30 UTC+1

Russia
2

			1	2	3	4	5
1	(England) (Russia)	Julia Mann; Elena Sukhareva	3; 7	4; 7	0; 7
2	(England) (Russia)	Tracey Hallam; Anastasia Russkikh	4; 7	7; 2	8; 6	7; 4
3	(England) (Russia)	Elizabeth Cann; Ekaterina Ananina	7; 4	7; 5	7; 5
4	(England) (Russia)	Ella Miles / Sara Sankey; Irina Ruslyakova / Marina Yakusheva	7; 4	2; 7	7; 4	5; 7	7; 8
5	(England) (Russia)	Gail Emms / Joanne Wright; Ekaterina Ananina / Anastasia Russkikh	2; 7	7; 1	7; 3	5; 7	7; 3

United States
0
Indoor-Sportcentrum Eindhoven
21 February 2002, 14:30 UTC+1

Russia
5

			1	2	3	4	5
1	(United States) (Russia)	Meiluawati; Elena Sukhareva	7; 8	2; 7	3; 7
2	(United States) (Russia)	Mesinee Mangkalakiri; Anastasia Russkikh	2; 7	0; 7	0; 7
3	(United States) (Russia)	Elie Wu; Ekaterina Ananina	0; 7	8; 6	3; 7	1; 7
4	(United States) (Russia)	Shannon Hsu / Joy Kitzmiller; Irina Ruslyakova / Marina Yakusheva	1; 7	2; 7	5; 7
5	(United States) (Russia)	Mesinee Mangkalakiri / Elie Wu; Ekaterina Ananina / Anastasia Russkikh	0; 7	1; 7	3; 7

England
4
Indoor-Sportcentrum Eindhoven
21 February 2002, 14:30 UTC+1

Wales
1

			1	2	3	4	5
1	(England) (Wales)	Julia Mann; Kelly Morgan	0; 7	0; 7	0; 7
2	(England) (Wales)	Tracey Hallam; Kate Ridler	7; 1	7; 3	7; 1
3	(England) (Wales)	Ella Miles / Sara Sankey; Felicity Gallup / Joanne Muggeridge	3; 7	7; 5	7; 2	3; 7	7; 3
4	(England) (Wales)	Rebecca Pantaney; Katie Howell	7; 0	7; 3	7; 1
5	(England) (Wales)	Gail Emms / Joanne Wright; Robyn Ashworth / Kate Ridler	7; 0	7; 2	7; 2

England
4
Indoor-Sportcentrum Eindhoven
22 February 2002, 14:30 UTC+1

United States
1

			1	2	3	4	5
1	(England) (United States)	Julia Mann; Meiluawati	7; 3	7; 2	7; 5
2	(England) (United States)	Tracey Hallam; Mesinee Mangkalakiri	7; 1	7; 0	7; 2
3	(England) (United States)	Elizabeth Cann; Elie Wu	7; 4	5; 7	5; 7	6; 8
4	(England) (United States)	Ella Miles / Sara Sankey; Shannon Hsu / Joy Kitzmiller	7; 0	7; 4	7; 2
5	(England) (United States)	Gail Emms / Joanne Wright; Mesinee Mangkalakiri / Elie Wu	7; 1	7; 1	7; 0

Wales
1
Indoor-Sportcentrum Eindhoven
22 February 2002, 14:30 UTC+1

Russia
4

			1	2	3	4	5
1	(Wales) (Russia)	Kelly Morgan; Elena Sukhareva	7; 5	7; 2	8; 6
2	(Wales) (Russia)	Kate Ridler; Anastasia Russkikh	2; 7	0; 7	0; 7
3	(Wales) (Russia)	Katie Howell; Ekaterina Ananina	6; 8	1; 7	4; 7
4	(Wales) (Russia)	Felicity Gallup / Joanne Muggeridge; Irina Ruslyakova / Marina Yakusheva	6; 8	3; 7	7; 4	0; 7
5	(Wales) (Russia)	Robyn Ashworth / Kate Ridler; Ekaterina Ananina / Anastasia Russkikh	2; 7	0; 7	0; 7

==== Group Y ====
Pos	Team	Pld	W	L	MF	MA	MD	GF	GA	GD	PF	PA	PD	Pts	Qualification
1	Germany	3	3	0	14	1	+13	43	6	+37	323	151	+172	3	Advance to Knockout stage
2	Ukraine	3	2	1	8	7	+1	27	29	−2	272	299	−27	2	
3	Sweden	3	1	2	4	11	−7	18	35	−17	243	303	−60	1	
4	Canada	3	0	3	4	11	−7	16	34	−18	213	298	−85	0	

Source: toernooi.nl

Germany
5
Indoor-Sportcentrum Eindhoven
20 February 2002, 18:00 UTC+1

Sweden
0

			1	2	3	4	5
1	(Germany) (Sweden)	Nicole Grether; Sara Persson	8; 6	3; 7	7; 2	7; 4
2	(Germany) (Sweden)	Petra Overzier; Katja Wengberg	7; 3	7; 2	7; 0
3	(Germany) (Sweden)	Juliane Schenk; Sophia Hansson	7; 0	7; 1	7; 1
4	(Germany) (Sweden)	Nicole Grether / Nicol Pitro; Elin Bergblom / Johanna Persson	7; 2	7; 4	7; 5
5	(Germany) (Sweden)	Carina Mette / Juliane Schenk; Lina Alfredsson / Sara Alfredsson	7; 4	7; 5	7; 2

Canada
2
Indoor-Sportcentrum Eindhoven
20 February 2002, 18:00 UTC+1

Ukraine
3

			1	2	3	4	5
1	(Canada) (Ukraine)	Jody Patrick; Elena Nozdran	0; 7	2; 7	0; 7
2	(Canada) (Ukraine)	Kara Solmundson; Natalja Esipenko	6; 8	7; 2	7; 8	7; 3	7; 8
3	(Canada) (Ukraine)	Denyse Julien; Larisa Griga	7; 0	7; 3	7; 5
4	(Canada) (Ukraine)	Milaine Cloutier / Robbyn Hermitage; Natalja Esipenko / Larisa Griga	8; 7	7; 4	3; 7	7; 2
5	(Canada) (Ukraine)	Denyse Julien / Tammy Sun; Natalia Golovkina / Elena Nozdran	3; 7	2; 7	2; 7

Canada
2
Indoor-Sportcentrum Eindhoven
21 February 2002, 18:00 UTC+1

Sweden
3

			1	2	3	4	5
1	(Canada) (Sweden)	Jody Patrick; Sara Persson	2; 7	3; 7	8; 6	4; 7
2	(Canada) (Sweden)	Kara Solmundson; Katja Wengberg	1; 7	2; 7	3; 7
3	(Canada) (Sweden)	Denyse Julien; Sophia Hansson	7; 4	7; 2	7; 2
4	(Canada) (Sweden)	Milaine Cloutier / Robbyn Hermitage; Elin Bergblom / Johanna Persson	7; 3	7; 5	7; 4
5	(Canada) (Sweden)	Denyse Julien / Tammy Sun; Lina Alfredsson / Sara Alfredsson	5; 7	2; 7	0; 7

Germany
4
Indoor-Sportcentrum Eindhoven
21 February 2002, 18:00 UTC+1

Ukraine
1

			1	2	3	4	5
1	(Germany) (Ukraine)	Nicole Grether; Elena Nozdran	5; 7	7; 3	5; 7	1; 7
2	(Germany) (Ukraine)	Katja Michalowsky; Natalia Golovkina	7; 0	7; 0	7; 0
3	(Germany) (Ukraine)	Petra Overzier; Natalja Esipenko	7; 4	7; 0	7; 1
4	(Germany) (Ukraine)	Carina Mette / Juliane Schenk; Natalia Golovkina / Elena Nozdran	7; 4	2; 7	7; 4	7; 4
5	(Germany) (Ukraine)	Nicole Grether / Nicol Pitro; Natalja Esipenko / Larisa Griga	7; 1	7; 2	7; 0

Sweden
1
Indoor-Sportcentrum Eindhoven
22 February 2002, 18:00 UTC+1

Ukraine
4

			1	2	3	4	5
1	(Sweden) (Ukraine)	Sara Persson; Elena Nozdran	7; 2	4; 7	6; 8	3; 7
2	(Sweden) (Ukraine)	Katja Wengberg; Natalja Esipenko	7; 3	2; 7	7; 3	4; 7	5; 7
3	(Sweden) (Ukraine)	Sophia Hansson; Larisa Griga	1; 7	3; 7	8; 6	5; 7
4	(Sweden) (Ukraine)	Elin Bergblom / Johanna Persson; Natalja Esipenko / Natalia Golovkina	7; 3	7; 4	5; 7	7; 3
5	(Sweden) (Ukraine)	Lina Alfredsson / Sara Alfredsson; Larisa Griga / Elena Nozdran	7; 5	2; 7	3; 7	6; 8

Germany
5
Indoor-Sportcentrum Eindhoven
22 February 2002, 18:00 UTC+1

Canada
0

			1	2	3	4	5
1	(Germany) (Canada)	Katja Michalowsky; Jody Patrick	7; 4	8; 6	7; 0
2	(Germany) (Canada)	Petra Overzier; Kara Solmundson	7; 3	4; 7	7; 5	7; 0
3	(Germany) (Canada)	Juliane Schenk; Denyse Julien	7; 0	7; 1	7; 4
4	(Germany) (Canada)	Nicole Grether / Nicol Pitro; Milaine Cloutier / Robbyn Hermitage	7; 5	7; 1	7; 4
5	(Germany) (Canada)	Caren Hückstädt / Carina Mette; Denyse Julien / Tammy Sun	7; 5	7; 4	7; 3

==== Group Z ====
Pos	Team	Pld	W	L	MF	MA	MD	GF	GA	GD	PF	PA	PD	Pts	Qualification
1	Netherlands	3	3	0	15	0	+15	45	6	+39	345	156	+189	3	Advance to Knockout stage
2	India	3	1	2	5	10	−5	22	33	−11	234	298	−64	1	
3	New Zealand	3	1	2	5	10	−5	21	35	−14	254	310	−56	1	
4	Bulgaria	3	1	2	5	10	−5	18	32	−14	207	276	−69	1	

Source: toernooi.nl

Netherlands
5
Indoor-Sportcentrum Eindhoven
20 February 2002, 18:00 UTC+1

Bulgaria
0

			1	2	3	4	5
1	(Netherlands) (Bulgaria)	Judith Meulendijks; Petya Nedelcheva	7; 4	7; 1	7; 3
2	(Netherlands) (Bulgaria)	Yao Jie; Diana Dimova	7; 0	7; 0	7; 1
3	(Netherlands) (Bulgaria)	Brenda Beenhakker; Dimitriika Dimitrova	7; 0	7; 2	8; 6
4	(Netherlands) (Bulgaria)	Lotte Jonathans / Judith Meulendijks; Neli Boteva / Petya Nedelcheva	7; 2	6; 7	7; 2	7; 0
5	(Netherlands) (Bulgaria)	Brenda Beenhakker / Karina de Wit; Diana Dimova / Maya Ivanova	3; 7	7; 1	7; 1	7; 2

New Zealand
3
Indoor-Sportcentrum Eindhoven
20 February 2002, 18:00 UTC+1

India
2

			1	2	3	4	5
1	(New Zealand) (India)	Rhona Robertson; Aparna Popat	2; 7	3; 7	0; 7
2	(New Zealand) (India)	Nicole Gordon; Trupti Murgunde	3; 7	8; 6	0; 7	7; 2	6; 8
3	(New Zealand) (India)	Tammy Jenkins / Rhona Robertson; Jwala Gutta / Shruti Kurien	2; 7	7; 2	7; 2	3; 7	7; 0
4	(New Zealand) (India)	Rebecca Gordon; Neelima Choudhary	2; 7	7; 1	3; 7	7; 3	7; 5
5	(New Zealand) (India)	Nicole Gordon / Sara Runesten-Petersen; Madhumita Bisht / P. V. V. Lakshmi	3; 7	7; 1	7; 4	7; 1

New Zealand
2
Indoor-Sportcentrum Eindhoven
21 February 2002, 18:00 UTC+1

Bulgaria
3

			1	2	3	4	5
1	(New Zealand) (Bulgaria)	Rhona Robertson; Petya Nedelcheva	0; 7	4; 7	4; 7
2	(New Zealand) (Bulgaria)	Nicole Gordon; Neli Boteva	2; 7	7; 1	5; 7	0; 7
3	(New Zealand) (Bulgaria)	Rebecca Gordon; Dimitriika Dimitrova	7; 2	7; 5	7; 3
4	(New Zealand) (Bulgaria)	Tammy Jenkins / Rhona Robertson; Neli Boteva / Petya Nedelcheva	3; 7	7; 8	3; 7
5	(New Zealand) (Bulgaria)	Nicole Gordon / Sara Runesten-Petersen; Diana Dimova / Maya Ivanova	7; 4	7; 1	7; 5

Netherlands
5
Indoor-Sportcentrum Eindhoven
21 February 2002, 18:00 UTC+1

India
0

			1	2	3	4	5
1	(Netherlands) (India)	Yao Jie; Aparna Popat	7; 1	7; 0	7; 3
2	(Netherlands) (India)	Brenda Beenhakker; Jwala Gutta	7; 0	7; 1	7; 1
3	(Netherlands) (India)	Karina de Wit; Trupti Murgunde	7; 2	7; 5	7; 5
4	(Netherlands) (India)	Lotte Jonathans / Judith Meulendijks; Jwala Gutta / Shruti Kurien	7; 3	5; 7	7; 2	7; 5
5	(Netherlands) (India)	Brenda Beenhakker / Karina de Wit; Madhumita Bisht / P. V. V. Lakshmi	7; 1	7; 4	7; 5

Bulgaria
2
Indoor-Sportcentrum Eindhoven
22 February 2002, 18:00 UTC+1

India
3

			1	2	3	4	5
1	(Bulgaria) (India)	Petya Nedelcheva; Aparna Popat	7; 3	7; 3	7; 1
2	(Bulgaria) (India)	Neli Boteva; Trupti Murgunde	4; 7	3; 7	5; 7
3	(Bulgaria) (India)	Diana Dimova / Maya Ivanova; Madhumita Bisht / P. V. V. Lakshmi	7; 1	7; 8	7; 4	7; 0
4	(Bulgaria) (India)	Dimitriika Dimitrova; Neelima Choudhary	3; 7	1; 7	1; 7
5	(Bulgaria) (India)	Neli Boteva / Petya Nedelcheva; Jwala Gutta / Shruti Kurien	7; 1	0; 7	6; 7	4; 7

Netherlands
5
Indoor-Sportcentrum Eindhoven
22 February 2002, 18:00 UTC+1

New Zealand
0

			1	2	3	4	5
1	(Netherlands) (New Zealand)	Judith Meulendijks; Rhona Robertson	3; 7	7; 3	7; 2	7; 5
2	(Netherlands) (New Zealand)	Yao Jie; Nicole Gordon	7; 0	7; 2	7; 0
3	(Netherlands) (New Zealand)	Karina de Wit; Rebecca Gordon	7; 2	8; 6	7; 8	7; 5
4	(Netherlands) (New Zealand)	Lotte Jonathans / Yao Jie; Tammy Jenkins / Rhona Robertson	2; 7	8; 6	8; 6	7; 4
5	(Netherlands) (New Zealand)	Brenda Beenhakker / Karina de Wit; Nicole Gordon / Sara Runesten-Petersen	7; 1	7; 3	7; 5

=== Knockout stage ===
Semi-finals
Denmark	3
England	1
Germany	3
Netherlands	1

Final
Denmark	3
Germany	2
Third place
Netherlands	3
England	2

==== Semi-finals ====
Germany
3
Indoor-Sportcentrum Eindhoven
23 February 2002, 12:00 UTC+1

Netherlands
1

			1	2	3	4	5
1	(Germany) (Netherlands)	Katja Michalowsky; Yao Jie	0; 7	0; 7	1; 7
2	(Germany) (Netherlands)	Petra Overzier; Brenda Beenhakker	4; 7	7; 4	7; 0	7; 4
3	(Germany) (Netherlands)	Juliane Schenk; Karina de Wit	8; 6	7; 1	7; 2
4	(Germany) (Netherlands)	Nicole Grether / Nicol Pitro; Lotte Jonathans / Karina de Wit	7; 2	7; 0	4; 7	8; 7
5	(Germany) (Netherlands)	Carina Mette / Juliane Schenk; Brenda Beenhakker / Yao Jie						not played

Denmark
3
Indoor-Sportcentrum Eindhoven
23 February 2002, 16:00 UTC+1

England
1

			1	2	3	4	5
1	(Denmark) (England)	Camilla Martin; Julia Mann	7; 2	7; 2	7; 0
2	(Denmark) (England)	Rikke Olsen / Majken Vange; Liza Parker / Suzanne Rayappan	7; 2	8; 6	3; 7	4; 7	7; 3
3	(Denmark) (England)	Tine Rasmussen; Tracey Hallam	0; 7	7; 3	7; 1	3; 7	4; 7
4	(Denmark) (England)	Pernille Harder / Mette Schjoldager; Gail Emms / Joanne Wright	7; 3	7; 0	7; 4
5	(Denmark) (England)	Christina Sørensen; Rebecca Pantaney						not played

==== Third place ====
Netherlands
3
Indoor-Sportcentrum Eindhoven
24 February 2002, 14:00 UTC+1

England
2

			1	2	3	4	5
1	(Netherlands) (England)	Judith Meulendijks; Julia Mann	1; 7
2	(Netherlands) (England)	Yao Jie; Tracey Hallam	7; 1	8; 6	7; 5
3	(Netherlands) (England)	Karina de Wit; Elizabeth Cann	8; 6	4; 7	8; 7	3; 7	7; 3
4	(Netherlands) (England)	Brenda Beenhakker / Yao Jie; Gail Emms / Joanne Wright	6; 8	7; 2	1; 7	0; 7
5	(Netherlands) (England)	Lotte Jonathans / Karina de Wit; Ella Miles / Sara Sankey	8; 7	3; 7	1; 7	7; 5	7; 3

==== Final ====
Denmark
3
Indoor-Sportcentrum Eindhoven
24 February 2002, 14:00 UTC+1

Germany
2

			1	2	3	4	5
1	(Denmark) (Germany)	Camilla Martin; Katja Michalowsky	7; 3	7; 1	7; 3
2	(Denmark) (Germany)	Christina Sørensen; Petra Overzier	7; 3	6; 8	7; 4	1; 7	2; 7
3	(Denmark) (Germany)	Anne Marie Pedersen; Juliane Schenk	5; 7	1; 7	7; 4	7; 3	3; 7
4	(Denmark) (Germany)	Pernille Harder / Mette Schjoldager; Nicole Grether / Nicol Pitro	7; 3	3; 7	8; 6	7; 0
5	(Denmark) (Germany)	Jane Bramsen / Ann-Lou Jørgensen; Carina Mette / Juliane Schenk	7; 0	7; 1	7; 5
