= Norwegian National Badminton Championships =

Badminton competition in Norway

The Norwegian National Badminton Championships is a tournament organized to crown the best badminton players in Norway.

The tournament started in 1939 and is held every year.

== Past winners ==
Year	Men's singles	Women's singles	Men's doubles	Women's doubles	Mixed doubles
1939	Hjalmar Lystad	Gerd Langholen	Hjalmar Lystad; Jan Nyquist	No competition	Hjalmar Lystad; Gerd Langholen
1940	Hjalmar Lystad	Gerd Langholen	Hjalmar Lystad; Jan Nyquist	No competition	Hjalmar Lystad; Ingrid Bergersen
1941; 1946	No competition				
1947	Hjalmar Lystad	Aase Hansson	Ingolf Paller; Per Nielsen	Elinor Lystad; Bebs David-Andersen	Karre Sandvik; Wenche Hilt
1948	Hjalmar Lystad	Aase Hansson	Ørvar Tollås; Inge Brevik	Gerd Ronne; Bebs David-Andersen	Hjalmar Lystad; Gerd Ronne
1949	Per Nielsen	Aase Hansson	Ørvar Tollås; Inge Brevik	Aase Hansson; Berit Elgaaen	Carsten Hansson; Aase Hansson
1950	Per Nielsen	Aase Hansson	Ingolf Paller; Per Nielsen	Aase Hansson; Inge Flognfeldt	Reidar Engebretsen; Inge Flognfeldt
1951	Johan Elgaaen	Inge Flognfeld	Ingolf Paller; Per Nielsen	Olly Talet; Inge Flognfeldt	Reidar Engebretsen; Inge Flognfeldt
1952	Johan Elgaaen	Aase Hansson	Reidar Engebretsen; Aage Henriksen	Olly Talet; Inge Flogenfeldt	Reidar Engebretsen; Inge Flognfeldt
1953	Hans Gustav Myhre	Randi Holand	Reidar Engebretsen; Aage Henriksen	Tony Preede; Randi Holand	Johan Elgaaen; Bert Elgaaen
1954	Hans Sperre	Randi Holand	Hans Gustav Myhre; Per Corneliussen	Berit Guren; Randi Holand	Johan Elgaaen; Bert Elgaaen
1955	Hans Sperre	Randi Holand	Hans Gustav Myhre; Per Corneliussen	Berit Guren; Randi Holand	Hans Gustav Myhre; Lisser Ytterborg
1956	Hans Gustav Myhre	Randi Holand	Hans Gustav Myhre; Per Corneliussen	Lisser Ytteborg; Inge Flognfeldt	Hans Sperre; Randi Holand
1957	Hans Sperre	Randi Holand	Hans Sperre; Svein Goli	Randi Holand; Ragnhild Holand	Hans Sperre; Randi Holand
1958	Hans Gustav Myhre	Randi Holand	Hans Gustav Myhre; Wilhelm Koren	Randi Holand; Ragnhild Holand	Hans Sperre; Randi Holand
1959	Hans Gustav Myhre	Ragnhild Holand	Hans Gustav Myhre; Erik Kjølberg	Randi Holand; Ragnhild Holand	Hans Sperre; Randi Holand
1960	Hans Sperre	Randi Holand	Hans Sperre; Harald Nettli	Randi Holand; Ragnhild Holand	Hans Sperre; Randi Holand
1961	Hans Sperre	Randi Holand	Harald Nettli; Per Corneliussen	Randi Holand; Ragnhild Holand	Hans Sperre; Randi Holand
1962	Kåre Samuelsen	Randi Holand	Harald Nettli; Per Corneliussen	Randi Holand; Ragnhild Holand	Hans Sperre; Randi Holand
1963	Hans Sperre	Ragnhild Holand	Harald Nettli; Per Corneliussen	Randi Holand; Ragnhild Holand	Hans Sperre; Randi Holand
1964	Harald Nettli	Ragnhild Holand	Tore Engebretsen; Per Corneliussen	Randi Holand; Ragnhild Holand	Jan Holtnæs; Lisser Ytterborg
1965	Harald Nettli	Ragnhild Holand	Harald Nettli; Hans Sperre	Lisser Ytterborg; Mette Wildhagen	Hans Sperre; Ragnhild Holand
1966	Hans Sperre	Ragnhild Holand	Harald Nettli; Hans Sperre	Randi Holand; Ragnhild Holand	Harald Nettli; Berit Hagtveld
1967	Jan Holtnæs	Ragnhild Holand	Harald Nettli; Hans Sperre	Berit Hagtvedt; Elisabeth Eide	Harald Nettli; Berit Hagtveld
1968	Hans Sperre	Randi Golbradsen	Harald Nettli; Hans Sperre	Randi Gulbrandsen; Ragnhild Holand	Hans Sperre; Ragnhild Holand
1969	Hans Sperre	Ragnhild Holand	Jan Holtnæs; Pål Øian	Kari Jørgensen; Elisabeth Eide	Harald Nettli; Elisabeth Eide
1970	Harrald Nettli	Elisabeth Eide	Harald Nettli; Knut Engebretsen	Kari Jørgensen; Elisabeth Eide	Hans Sperre; Inger Mette Bjorvik
1971	Hans Sperre	Kari Histøl	Jan Holtnæs; Pål Øian	Kari Histøl; Wenche Tønnesen	Harald Nettli; Elisabeth Sommerfeldt
1972	Knut Engebretsen	Elisabeth Sommerfeldt	Knut Engebretsen; Pål Øian	Berit Hagtvadt; Kjersti Haakonen	Pål Øian; Elisabeth Sommerfeldt
1973	Knut Engebretsen	Kari Histøl	Harald Nettli; Hans Sperre	Kari Histøl; Wenche Tønnesen	Petter Thoresen; Inge Mette Olsen
1974	Petter Thoresen	Kari Histøl	Petter Thoresen; Haakon Ringdal	Kari Histøl; Wenche Tønnesen	Harald Nettli; Elisabeth Sommerfeldt
1975	Haakon Ringdal	Kari Histøl	Petter Thoresen; Haakon Ringdal	Bodil Aabol; Else Thoresen	Harald Nettli; Else Thoresen
1976	Petter Thoresen	Kari Histøl	Petter Thoresen; Haakon Ringdal	Anne Svarstadt; Else Thoresen	Hans Sperre; Else Thoresen
1977	Knut Engebretsen	Else Thoresen	Petter Thoresen; Haakon Ringdal	Anne Svarstadt; Else Thoresen	Hans Sperre; Else Thoresen
1978	Knut Engebretsen	Else Thoresen	Knut Engebretsen; Terje Dag Østhassel	Anne Svarstadt; Else Thoresen	Haakon Ringdal; Anne Svarstad
1979	Petter Thoresen	Else Thoresen	Petter Thoresen; Haakon Ringdal	Anne Svarstadt; Else Thoresen	Haakon Ringdal; Anne Svarstad
1980	Petter Thoresen	Else Thoresen	Petter Thoresen; Haakon Ringdal	Anne Svarstadt; Else Thoresen	Hans Christian Seeberg; Anne Svarstad
1981	Petter Thoresen	Else Thoresen	Petter Thoresen; Haakon Ringdal	Anne Svarstadt; Else Thoresen	Hans Christian Seeberg; Anne Svarstad
1982	Haakon Ringdal	Else Thoresen	Vidar Meum; Terje Dag Østhassel	Karin Christensen; Else Thoresen	Hans Sperre; Else Thoresen
1983	Petter Thoresen	Else Thoresen	Tomm Eriksen; Hans Christian Seeberg	Kjersti Torp; Marianne Wikdal	Geir Dahl; Marianne Wikdal
1984	Petter Thoresen	Sisel Svestad	Øyvind Berntsen; Espen Larsen	Kari Johansen; Trine Leikvold	Per Rose; Anne Svarstad
1985	Øyvind Berntsen	Ellen Berg	Øyvind Berntsen; Roar Kaupang	Kari Johansen; Hege Skagun	Jorn Myerstrand; Trine Leikvold
1986	Hans Sperre Jr.	Marianne Wikdal	Hans Sperre Jr. Jorn Myrestrand	Gry Solberg; Marianne Wikdal	Thore Næss; Marianne Wikdal
1987	Hans Sperre Jr.	Marianne Wikdal	Øyvind Berntsen; Roar Kaupang	Ellen Berg; Gro Storvik	Thore Næss; Marianne Wikdal
1988	Hans Sperre Jr.	Marianne Wikdal	Øyvind Berntsen; Thore Næss	Marianne Wikdal; Gry Kirsti Solberg	Thore Næss; Marianne Wikdal
1989	Hans Sperre Jr.	Ellen Berg	Hans Sperre Jr. Tor Egil Kristensen	Marianne Wikdal; Gry Kirsti Solberg	Thore Næss; Marianne Wikdal
1990	Hans Sperre Jr.	Ellen Berg	Hans Sperre; Erik Lia	Marianne Wikdal; Gry Kirsti Solberg	Thore Næss; Marianne Wikdal
1991	Hans Sperre Jr.	Tove Hol	Hans Sperre; Erik Lia	Camilla Silwer; Sissel Woland	Trond Wåland; Camilla Silwer
1992	Hans Sperre Jr.	Tove Hol	Hans Sperre; Erik Lia	Camilla Silwer; Sissel Woland	Trond Wåland; Camilla Silwer
1993	Hans Sperre Jr.	Tove Hol	Hans Sperre; Erik Lia	Gri Kirsti Skjonhaung; Sissel Lindenroth	Trond Wåland; Camilla Silwer
1994	Hans Sperre Jr.	Camilla Silwer	Trond Wåland; Erik Lia	Tove Hol; Nina Haaland	Trond Wåland; Camilla Silwer
1995	Hans Sperre Jr.	Camilla Silwer	Trond Wåland; Erik Lia	Camilla Silwer; Sissel Lindenroth	Trond Wåland; Camilla Silwer
1996	Hans Sperre Jr.	Camilla Wright	Trond Wåland; Erik Lia	Camilla Silwer; Sissel Lindenroth	Trond Wåland; Camilla Silwer
1997	Hans Sperre Jr.	Sissel Linderoth	Trond Wåland; Jim Ronny Andersen	Camilla Silwer; Sissel Lindenroth	Trond Wåland; Camilla Wright
1998	Hans Sperre Jr.	Sissel Linderoth	Trond Wåland; Jim Ronny Andersen	Gry Kirsti Skjønhaug; Monica Halversen	Trond Wåland; Sissel Linderoth
1999	Hans Sperre Jr.	Sissel Linderoth	Kristian Larsen; Thomas Andersen	Sissel Linderoth; Camilla Wright	Trond Wåland; Camilla Wright
2000	Jim Ronny Andersen	Helene Abusdal	Trond Wåland; Erik Lia	Helene Abusdal; Anita Elson	Trond Wåland; Camilla Wright
2001	Jim Ronny Andersen	Monica Halvorsen	Trond Wåland; Erik Lia	Helene Abusdal; Anita Elson	Sverre Bergland; Gry Kirsti Skjønhaug
2002	Hans Sperre Jr.	Monica Halvorsen	Hans Sperre; Sverre Bergland	Gry Kirsti Skjønhaug; Sara Blengsli Kværnø	Jim Ronny Andersen; Helene Abusdal
2003	Jim Ronny Andersen	Monica Halvorsen	Trond Wåland; Kristian Larsen	Sara Blengsli Kværnø; Monica Halvorsen	Per Thomas Mørk; Monica Halvorsen
2004	Jim Ronny Andersen	Sara Blengsli Kværnø	Trond Wåland; Jim Ronny Andersen	Gry Kirsti Skjønhaug; Helene Norland	Jim Ronny Andersen; Helene Abusdal
2005	Jim Ronny Andersen	Monica Halvorsen	Jim Ronny Andersen; Lars Gunnar Abusdal	Monica Halvorsen; Helene Abusdal	Trond Wåland; Anita Elson
2006	Hans Sperre Jr.	Helene Abusdal	Steinar Klausen; Erik Rundle	Gry Kirsti Skjønhaug; Helene Norland	Erik Rundle; Helene Abusdal
2007	Steinar Klausen	Sara Blengsli Kværnø	Steinar Klausen; Erik Rundle	Gry Kirsti Skjønhaug; Helene Norland	Sverre Bergland; Gry Kirsti Skjønhaug
2008	Steinar Klausen	Sara Blengsli Kværnø	Steinar Klausen; Erik Rundle	Monica Halvorsen; Mari Helene Bøe	Hallstein Oma; Sara Blengsli Kværnø
2009	Steinar Klausen	Sara Blengsli Kværnø	Steinar Klausen; Erik Rundle	Cathrine Fossmo; Mari Helene Bøe	Hallstein Oma; Sara Blengsli Kværnø
2010	Steinar Klausen	Sara Blengsli Kværnø	Steinar Klausen; Erik Rundle	Monica Halvorsen; Sara Blengsli Kværnø	Jim Ronny Andersen; Helene Abusdal
2011	Steinar Klausen	Sara Blengsli Kværnø	Steinar Klausen; Erik Rundle	Monica Halvorsen; Hanna Blengsli Kværnø	Jim Ronny Andersen; Helene Abusdal
2012	Jim Ronny Andersen	Sara Blengsli Kværnø	Steinar Klausen; Erik Rundle	Monica Halvorsen; Sara Blengsli Kværnø	Jim Ronny Andersen; Helene Abusdal
2013	Marius Myhre	Cathrine Fossmo	Marius Myhre; André Andersen	Cathrine Fossmo; Marie Wåland	Erik Rundle; Helene Abusdal
2014	Marius Myhre	Helene Abusdal	Steinar Klausen; Erik Rundle	Sonja Wåland; Helene Abusdal	Jim Ronny Andersen; Helene Abusdal
2015	Marius Myhre	Cathrine Fossmo	Steinar Klausen; Erik Rundle	Anne Klyve; Helene Håkonsen Søgaard	Erik Rundle; Sonja Wåland
2016	Marius Myhre	Vilde Espeseth	Vegard Rikheim; Magnus Christensen	Anne Klyve; Helene Håkonsen Søgaard	Jim Ronny Andersen; Helene Abusdal
2017	Marius Myhre	Vilde Espeseth	Vegard Rikheim; Magnus Christensen	Natalie Syvertsen; Solvår S. Flåten Jørgensen	Jonas Christensen; Marie Christensen
2018	Marius Myhre	Helene Abusdal	Fredrik Kristensen; Magnus Christensen	Natalie Syvertsen; Solvår S. Flåten Jørgensen	Magnus Christensen; Natalie Syvertsen
2019	Marius Myhre	Emilie Sotnes Hamang	Carl Christian Mork; Sturla Flåten Jørgensen	Sofia Macsali; Emilia Petersen Norberg	Marius Myhre; Aimee Hong
2020	Markus Barth	Emilie Sotnes Hamang	Carl Christian Mork; Fredrik Kristensen	Sofia Macsali; Emilia Petersen Norberg	Fredrik Kristensen; Natalie Syvertsen
2021	Peter Rønn Stensæth	Sofia Louis Macsali	Torjus Flåtten; Vegard Rikheim	Solvår Flåten Jørgensen; Natalie Syvertsen	Carl Christian Mork; Solvår Flåten Jørgensen
2022	Vegard Rikheim	Vilde Espeseth	Torjus Flåtten; Vegard Rikheim	Marie Christensen; Aimee Hong	Fredrik Kristensen; Aimee Hong
2023	Markus Barth	Vilde Espeseth	Torjus Flåtten; Vegard Rikheim	Marie Christensen; Aimee Hong	Jonas Østhassel; Julie Marie Andersen
2024	Vegard Rikheim	Vilde Espeseth	Torjus Flåtten; Vegard Rikheim	Marie Christensen; Aimee Hong	Jonas Østhassel; Julie Marie Andersen
2025	Torjus Flåtten	Sofia Macsali	Torjus Flåtten; Vegard Rikheim	Marie Christensen; Aimee Hong	Vegard Rikheim; Marie Christensen
