= Latvian National Badminton Championships =

The Latvian National Badminton Championships is a tournament organized to crown the best badminton players in Latvia. They are held since 1964.

== Past winners ==
Year	Men's singles	Women's singles	Men's doubles	Women's doubles	Mixed doubles
1964	Jānis Ieviņš	Skaidrīte Ieviņa	Jānis Ieviņš; Māris Deksnis	Skaidrīte Kalēja; Guna Karlsone	Jānis Ieviņš; Skaidrīte Ieviņa
1965	Jānis Ieviņš	Skaidrīte Ieviņa	Jānis Ieviņš; Māris Deksnis	Skaidrīte Ieviņa; Ārija Neimane	Jānis Ieviņš; Skaidrīte Ieviņa
1966	Jānis Ieviņš	Skaidrīte Ieviņa	Viesturs Urdziņš; Juris Jirgensons	Skaidrīte Ieviņa; Ināra Tērauda	Jānis Ieviņš; Skaidrīte Ieviņa
1967	Jānis Ieviņš	Skaidrīte Ieviņa	Viesturs Urdziņš; Juris Jirgensons	Gundega Grīnuma; I. Akmentiņa	Jānis Ieviņš; Gundega Grīnuma
1968	Viesturs Urdziņš	Gundega Grīnuma	Viesturs Urdziņš; Māris Deksnis	Gundega Grīnuma; Skaidrīte Ieviņa	Viesturs Urdziņš; Skaidrīte Ieviņa
1969	Juris Jirgensons	Gundega Grīnuma	Juris Jirgensons; Jānis Ieviņš	Gundega Grīnuma; Ilona Lāce	Jānis Ieviņš; Gundega Grīnuma
1970	Juris Jirgensons	Gundega Grīnuma	Juris Jirgensons; Genādijs Feldmanis	Gundega Grīnuma; Ināra Šķiņķe	Genādijs Feldmanis; Gundega Grīnuma
1971	Māris Preinbergs	Ilona Lāce	Jānis Ieviņš; Māris Preinbergs	Ilona Lāce; Skaidrīte Ieviņa	Genādijs Feldmanis; Skaidrīte Ieviņa
1972	Māris Preinbergs	Ilona Lāce	Juris Jirgensons; Jānis Ieviņš	Gundega Grīnuma; Skaidrīte Ieviņa	Jānis Ieviņš; Sarmīte Auna
1973	Egils Sudmalis	Ilona Lāce	Juris Jirgensons; Jānis Ieviņš	Ināra Tērauda; Sarmīte Auna	Jānis Ieviņš; Sarmīte Auna
1974	Egils Sudmalis	Gundega Grīnuma	Juris Jirgensons; Jānis Ieviņš	Gundega Grīnuma; Skaidrīte Ieviņa	Jānis Ieviņš; Gundega Grīnuma
1975	Egils Sudmalis	Gundega Grīnuma	Jānis Trops; Māris Sūkulis	Gundega Grīnuma; Ilona Lāce	Jānis Trops; Gundega Grīnuma
1976	Māris Preinbergs	Gundega Grīnuma	Māris Preinbergs; Jānis Trops	Gundega Grīnuma; Anna Šlika	Māris Preinbergs; Gundega Grīnuma
1977	Jānis Trops	Gundega Grīnuma	Māris Preinbergs; Jānis Trops	Gundega Grīnuma; Anna Šlika	Uldis Ābeltiņš; Ilona Lāce
1978	Jānis Trops	Una Ābeltiņa	Vladimirs Uļjanovs; Viktors Itkins	Ilona Lāce; Maija Liepkalna	Jānis Trops; Una Ābeltiņa
1979	Jānis Trops	Gunta Veisa	Māris Preinbergs; Jānis Trops	Gunta Veisa; Marina Ļapkalo	Viktors Itkins; Marina Ļapkalo
1980	Vladimirs Uļjanovs	Natālija Šora	Vladimirs Uļjanovs; Viktors Itkins	Natālija Šora; Marina Ļapkalo	Viktors Itkins; Marina Ļapkalo
1981	Vladimirs Uļjanovs	Marina Ļapkalo	Māris Preinbergs; Jānis Ozoliņš	Natālija Šora; Marina Ļapkalo	Viktors Itkins; Marina Ļapkalo
1982	Jānis Ozoliņš	Natālija Šora	Vladimirs Uļjanovs; Viktors Itkins	Natālija Šora; Maija Liepkalna	Vladimirs Uļjanovs; Natālija Šora
1983	Vladimirs Uļjanovs	Ginta Skrebele	Māris Preinbergs; Jānis Ozoliņš	Svetlana Agarkova; I. Svilāne	Vladimirs Uļjanovs; Maija Liepkalna
1984	Vladimirs Uļjanovs	Ginta Skrebele	Vladimirs Uļjanovs; Jurijs Uļjanovs	Ginta Skrebele; Dita Reinholde	Aivars Tērauds; Ginta Skrebele
1985	Vladimirs Uļjanovs	Ginta Skrebele	Aivars Tērauds; Viktors Itkins	Ginta Skrebele; Dita Reinholde	Viktors Itkins; Ginta Skrebele
1986	Vladimirs Uļjanovs	Ginta Skrebele	Zintis Lejiņš; Jānis Ozoliņš	Ginta Skrebele; Dita Reinholde	Vladimirs Uļjanovs; Ginta Skrebele
1987	Vladimirs Uļjanovs	Ginta Skrebele	Vladimirs Uļjanovs; Jurijs Uļjanovs	Ginta Skrebele; Dita Reinholde	Vladimirs Uļjanovs; Ginta Skrebele
1988	Vladimirs Uļjanovs	Ginta Skrebele	Vladimirs Uļjanovs; Jurijs Uļjanovs	Ginta Skrebele; Svetlana Agarkova	Vladimirs Uļjanovs; Ginta Skrebele
1989	Vladimirs Uļjanovs	Ginta Skrebele	Vladimirs Uļjanovs; Aivars Tērauds	Ginta Skrebele; Svetlana Agarkova	Vladimirs Uļjanovs; Ginta Skrebele
1990	Vladimirs Uļjanovs	Svetlana Agarkova	Vladimirs Uļjanovs; Jānis Kalniņš	Svetlana Agarkova; Gunta Karnupa	Vladimirs Uļjanovs; Svetlana Agarkova
1991	Vladimirs Uļjanovs	Kristīne Tīruma	Vladimirs Uļjanovs; Jānis Kalniņš	Ginta Skrebele; Gunta Karnupa	Vladimirs Uļjanovs; Ginta Skrebele
1992	Uģis Briedis	Kristīne Tīruma	Vladimirs Uļjanovs; Jānis Kalniņš	Kristīne Tīruma; Linda Upmale	Jānis Kalniņš; Gunta Karnupa
1993	Eduards Loze	Kristīne Tīruma	Eduards Loze; Mārtiņš Kažemaks	Kristīne Šefere; Dace Šneidere	Eduards Loze; Dace Šneidere
1994	Eduards Loze	Kristīne Šefere	Eduards Loze; Mārtiņš Kažemaks	Kristīne Šefere; Dace Šneidere	Eduards Loze; Dace Šneidere
1995	Eduards Loze	Kristīne Tīruma	Eduards Loze; Jānis Kalniņš	Kristīne Šefere; Dace Šneidere	Eduards Loze; Dace Šneidere
1996	Mārtiņš Kažemaks	Kristīne Tīruma	Mārtiņš Kažemaks; Jānis Zagorskis	Kristīne Tīruma; Linda Brice	Mārtiņš Kažemaks; Kristīne Šefere
1997	Eduards Loze	Kristīne Šefere	Eduards Loze; Mārtiņš Kažemaks	Kristīne Šefere; Margarita Miķelsone	Eduards Loze; Kristīne Šefere
1998	Eduards Loze	Kristīne Šefere	Eduards Loze; Mārtiņš Kažemaks	Kristīne Tīruma; Dace Šneidere	Eduards Loze; Kristīne Šefere
1999	Eduards Loze	Dace Šneidere	Eduards Loze; Mārtiņš Kažemaks	Kristīne Šefere; Margarita Miķelsone	Eduards Loze; Kristīne Šefere
2000	Mārtiņš Kažemaks	Kristīne Šefere	Mārtiņš Kažemaks; Edijs Līviņš	Kristīne Šefere; Dace Šneidere	Mārtiņš Kažemaks; Margarita Miķelsone
2001	Eduards Loze	Kristīne Šefere	Eduards Loze; Mārtiņš Kažemaks	Kristīne Šefere; Margarita Miķelsone	Reinis Belasovs; Kristīne Šefere
2002	Eduards Loze	Kristīne Šefere	Eduards Loze; Mārtiņš Kažemaks	Kristīne Šefere; Margarita Miķelsone	Imants Kelmers; Kristīne Šefere
2003	Eduards Loze	Kristīne Šefere	Kārlis Vidass; Guntis Lavrinovičs	Kristīne Šefere; Margarita Miķelsone	Raimonds Cipe; Kristīne Šefere
2004	Kārlis Vidass	Margarita Miķelsone	Kārlis Vidass; Guntis Lavrinovičs	Kristīne Šefere; Margarita Miķelsone	Kārlis Vidass; Kristīne Ķīsele
2005	Kārlis Vidass	Kristīne Šefere	Kārlis Vidass; Guntis Lavrinovičs	Kristīne Šefere; Margarita Miķelsone	Aivars Terauds; Kristīne Šefere
2006	Edijs Līviņš	Kristīne Šefere	Kārlis Vidass; Guntis Lavrinovičs	Kristīne Šefere; Margarita Miķelsone	Eduards Loze; Kristīne Šefere
2007	Eduards Loze	Kristīne Šefere	Eduards Loze; Edijs Līviņš	Kristīne Šefere; Madara Puķīte	Eduards Loze; Kristīne Šefere
2008	Kārlis Vidass	Kristīne Šefere	Kārlis Vidass; Guntis Lavrinovičs	Kristīne Šefere; Madara Puķīte	Eduards Loze; Kristīne Šefere
2009	Edijs Līviņš	Kristīne Šefere	Eduards Loze; Edijs Līviņš	Kristīne Šefere; Dace Šneidere	Eduards Loze; Kristīne Šefere
2010	Eduards Loze	Kristīne Šefere	Raimonds Cipe; Jānis Valeinis	Kristīne Šefere; Ieva Pope	Guntis Lavrinovičs; Kristīne Šefere
2011	Raimonds Cipe	Ieva Pope	Guntis Lavrinovičs; Kārlis Vidass	Kristīne Šefere; Ieva Pope	Eduards Loze; Kristīne Šefere
2012	Guntis Lavrinovičs	Monika Radovska	Guntis Lavrinovičs; Artūrs Akmens	Jekaterina Romanova; Ieva Eglīte	Guntis Lavrinovičs; Jekaterina Romanova
2013	Kārlis Vidass	Kristīne Šefere	Kārlis Vidass; Guntis Lavrinovičs	Ieva Pope; Kristīne Šefere	Kārlis Vidass; Monika Radovska
2014	Kārlis Vidass	Kristīne Šefere	Kārlis Vidass; Guntis Lavrinovičs	Ieva Pope; Kristīne Šefere	Kārlis Vidass; Monika Radovska
2015	Niks Podosinoviks	Monika Radovska	Edijs Līviņš; Toms Preinbergs	Ieva Pope; Kristīne Šefere	Reinis Krauklis; Kristīne Šefere
2016	Niks Podosinoviks	Kristīne Šefere	Jānis K. Gulbis; Teodors Kerimovs	Aija Pope; Kristīne Šefere	Niks Podosinoviks; Kristīne Šefere
2017	Niks Podosinoviks	Monika Radovska	Niks Podosinoviks; Reinis Šefers	Monika Radovska; Jekaterina Romanova	Guntis Lavrinovičs; Jekaterina Romanova
2018	Niks Podosinoviks	Una Berga	Niks Podosinoviks; Reinis Šefers	Monika Radovska; Ieva Pope	Niks Podosinoviks; Ieva Pope
2019	Niks Podosinoviks	Jekaterina Romanova	Niks Podosinoviks; Reinis Šefers	Jekaterina Romanova; Liāna Lencēviča	Reinis Krauklis; Diāna Stognija
2020	Niks Podosinoviks	Una Berga	Pauls Gureckis; Kārlis Vidass	Jekaterina Romanova; Liāna Lencēviča	Teodors Kerimovs; Jekaterina Romanova
2021	Niks Podosinoviks	Ieva Pope	Edijs Līviņš; Toms Preinbergs	Anna Kupča; Jekaterina Romanova	Teodors Kerimovs; Jekaterina Romanova
2022	Niks Podosinoviks	Anna Kupča	Artūrs Akmens; Reinis Krauklis	Anna Kupča; Jekaterina Romanova	Reinis Krauklis; Diāna Stognija
2023	Niks Podosinoviks	Ieva Pope	Artūrs Akmens; Reinis Krauklis	Anna Kupča; Jekaterina Romanova	Artūrs Akmens; Annija Rulle-Titava
2024	Niks Podosinoviks	Jekaterina Romanova	Artūrs Akmens; Reinis Krauklis	Liāna Lenceviča; Jekaterina Romanova	Toms Sala; Kristīne Gurecka
2025	Niks Podosinoviks	Jekaterina Romanova	Artūrs Akmens; Reinis Krauklis	Anna Kupča; Jekaterina Romanova	Artūrs Akmens; Anna Kupča
