= Marius Myhre =

Norwegian badminton player (born 1991)

Personal information
- Born: Marius Myhre Fartum; 21 November 1991 (age 34)

Sport
- Country: Norway
- Sport: Badminton
- Handedness: Right

Men's singles
- Tournaments played: 283 (136 wins–147 losses)
- Highest ranking: 80 (10 December 2015)
- BWF profile

Marius Myhre Fartum (born 21 November 1991) is a Norwegian badminton player. He is affiliated with Haugerud IF and has won nine Norwegian National Championships title, seven consecutive men's singles title from 2013–2019, 1 in the mixed and men's doubles respectively. Myhre won his first senior international title at the 2015 Norwegian International.

== Career ==
Myhre started practicing badminton at the age of ten, introduced and trained by his father, Rune Fartum, who also played badminton. He plays in the men's singles. He participated in the 2013, 2015 and 2017 BWF World Championships. He won his first international title at the home soil 2015 Norwegian International tournament, a feat no home player has achieved since Jim Ronny Andersen in 2000.

Myhre now works as a coach in Haugerud IF.

== Achievements ==
=== BWF International Challenge/Series ===
Men's singles

Year	Tournament	Opponent	Score	Result
2014	Riga International	(Estonia) Raul Must	5–14 retired	(silver) Runner-up
2015	Portugal International	(Japan) Kazumasa Sakai	13–21, 13–21	(silver) Runner-up
2015	Mercosul International	(Guatemala) Kevin Cordón	14–21, 17–21	(silver) Runner-up
2015	Norwegian International	(Denmark) Patrick Bjerregaard	21–19, 21–15	(gold) Winner
2016	Croatian International	(Italy) Wisnu Haryo Putro	14–21, 22–20, 21–13	(gold) Winner

BWF International Challenge tournament
BWF International Series tournament
BWF Future Series tournament
