= Badminton at the 2012 Summer Olympics – Women's singles =

Women's singles at the Games of the XXX Olympiad
- Venue: Wembley Arena
- Date: 28 July to 4 August 2012
- Competitors: 46 from 42 nations

Medalists
1st place, gold medalist(s)		Li Xuerui	China
2nd place, silver medalist(s)		Wang Yihan	China
3rd place, bronze medalist(s)		Saina Nehwal	India

The badminton women's singles tournament at the 2012 Olympic Games in London took place from 28 July to 4 August at Wembley Arena.

The draw was held on 23 July 2012. Forty-six players from 42 nations competed.

In an all-Chinese final, Li Xuerui defeated reigning World Number 1 Wang Yihan to win the gold medal. India's Saina Nehwal took bronze after the injury-forced withdrawal of China's Wang Xin. This was the first medal of any colour for India in Olympic badminton.

== Competition format ==
For the first time, the preliminary stage consisted of 16 groups of either two or three players. Each played every other member of the group with the top players advancing to the knock-out stage, ultimately leading to the winner.

== Seeds ==
A Total of 16 Players were given seeds.

1. Wang Yihan (CHN) (silver medallist)
2. Wang Xin (CHN) (fourth place)
3. Li Xuerui (CHN) (gold medallist)
4. Saina Nehwal (IND) (bronze medallist)
5. Tine Baun (DEN) (quarter-finals)
6. Juliane Schenk (GER) (round of 16)
7. Cheng Shao-chieh (TPE) (quarter-finals)
8. Sung Ji-hyun (KOR) (group stage)
9. Ratchanok Intanon (THA) (quarter-finals)
10. Tai Tzu-ying (TPE) (round of 16)
11. Bae Yeon-ju (KOR) (round of 16)
12. Sayaka Sato (JPN) (round of 16)
13. Gu Juan (SIN) (round of 16)
14. Yao Jie (NED) (round of 16)
15. Petya Nedelcheva (BUL) (group stage)
16. Pi Hongyan (FRA) (round of 16)

== Results ==
=== Group stage ===
==== Group A ====
Athlete	Pld	W	L	SW	SL	Pts
Wang Yihan (CHN)	1	1	0	2	0	1
Michelle Li (CAN)	1	0	1	0	2	0

30 July, 09:05
Athlete 1	Score	Athlete 2
Wang Yihan (CHN)	21–8; 21–16	Michelle Li (CAN)

==== Group B ====
Athlete	Pld	W	L	SW	SL	Pts
Bae Yeon-ju (KOR)	2	2	0	4	1	2
Tee Jing Yi (MAS)	2	1	1	3	2	1
Agnese Allegrini (ITA)	2	0	2	0	4	0

Athlete 1	Score	Athlete 2
28 July, 8:30
Bae Yeon-ju (KOR)	16–21; 21–15; 21–12	Tee Jing Yi (MAS)
30 July, 20:54
Agnese Allegrini (ITA)	7–21; 14–21	Tee Jing Yi (MAS)
31 July, 14:19
Bae Yeon-ju (KOR)	21–11; 21–15	Agnese Allegrini (ITA)

==== Group C ====
Athlete	Pld	W	L	SW	SL	Pts
Cheng Shao-chieh (TPE)	2	2	0	4	0	2
Neslihan Yiğit (TUR)	2	1	1	2	2	1
Simone Prutsch (AUT)	2	0	2	0	4	0

Athlete 1	Score	Athlete 2
28 July, 14:15
Neslihan Yiğit (TUR)	21–18; 21–10	Simone Prutsch (AUT)
30 July, 13:09
Cheng Shao-chieh (TPE)	21–11; 21–9	Simone Prutsch (AUT)
31 July, 12:30
Cheng Shao-chieh (TPE)	21–10; 21–6	Neslihan Yiğit (TUR)

==== Group D ====
Athlete	Pld	W	L	SW	SL	Pts
Gu Juan (SIN)	2	2	0	4	0	2
Victoria Na (AUS)	2	1	1	2	2	1
Monika Fašungová (SVK)	2	0	2	0	4	0

Athlete 1	Score	Athlete 2
29 July, 08:30
Gu Juan (SIN)	21–5; 21–11	Monika Fašungová (SVK)
30 July, 08:30
Victoria Na (AUS)	21–12; 21–18	Monika Fašungová (SVK)
31 July, 09:09
Gu Juan (SIN)	21–10; 21–7	Victoria Na (AUS)

==== Group E ====
Athlete	Pld	W	L	SW	SL	Pts
Saina Nehwal (IND)	2	2	0	4	0	2
Lianne Tan (BEL)	2	1	1	2	2	1
Sabrina Jaquet (SUI)	2	0	2	0	4	0

Athlete 1	Score	Athlete 2
28 July, 20:50
Lianne Tan (BEL)	21–16; 21–16	Sabrina Jaquet (SUI)
29 July, 13:42
Saina Nehwal (IND)	21–9; 21–4	Sabrina Jaquet (SUI)
30 July, 18:30
Saina Nehwal (IND)	21–4; 21–14	Lianne Tan (BEL)

==== Group F ====
Athlete	Pld	W	L	SW	SL	Pts
Yao Jie (NED)	2	2	0	4	0	2
Ragna Ingólfsdóttir (ISL)	2	1	1	2	2	1
Akvilė Stapušaitytė (LTU)	2	0	2	0	4	0

Athlete 1	Score	Athlete 2
29 July, 12:30
Yao Jie (NED)	21–16; 21–7	Akvilė Stapušaitytė (LTU)
30 July, 19:42
Ragna Ingólfsdóttir (ISL)	21–10; 21–16	Akvilė Stapušaitytė (LTU)
31 July, 20:54
Yao Jie (NED)	21–12; 25–23	Ragna Ingólfsdóttir (ISL)

==== Group G ====
Athlete	Pld	W	L	SW	SL	Pts
Tine Baun (DEN)	2	2	0	4	1	2
Anastasia Prokopenko (RUS)	2	1	1	3	2	1
Kamila Augustyn (POL)	2	0	2	0	4	0

Athlete 1	Score	Athlete 2
28 July, 09:05
Anastasia Prokopenko (RUS)	21–16; 21–17	Kamila Augustyn (POL)
30 July, 19:40
Tine Baun (DEN)	21–11; 21–6	Kamila Augustyn (POL)
31 July, 12:30
Tine Baun (DEN)	19–21; 21–15; 21–16	Anastasia Prokopenko (RUS)

==== Group H ====
Athlete	Pld	W	L	SW	SL	Pts
Sayaka Sato (JPN)	2	2	0	4	1	2
Susan Egelstaff (GBR)	2	1	1	3	2	1
Maja Tvrdy (SLO)	2	0	2	0	4	0

Athlete 1	Score	Athlete 2
28 July, 12:30
Susan Egelstaff (GBR)	21–15; 21–10	Maja Tvrdy (SLO)
29 July, 13:09
Sayaka Sato (JPN)	22–20; 21–18	Maja Tvrdy (SLO)
31 July, 13:05
Sayaka Sato (JPN)	18–21; 21–16; 21–12	Susan Egelstaff (GBR)

==== Group I ====
Athlete	Pld	W	L	SW	SL	Pts
Pi Hongyan (FRA)	2	2	0	4	1	2
Chloe Magee (IRL)	2	1	1	3	2	1
Hadia Hosny (EGY)	2	0	2	0	4	0

Athlete 1	Score	Athlete 2
29 July, 20:17
Chloe Magee (IRL)	21–17; 21–6	Hadia Hosny (EGY)
30 July, 20:52
Pi Hongyan (FRA)	21–11; 21–9	Hadia Hosny (EGY)
31 July, 14:17
Pi Hongyan (FRA)	16–21; 21–18; 21–14	Chloe Magee (IRL)

==== Group J ====
Athlete	Pld	W	L	SW	SL	Pts
Yip Pui Yin (HKG)	2	2	0	4	0	2
Sung Ji-hyun (KOR)	2	1	1	2	2	1
Sara Blengsli Kværnø (NOR)	2	0	2	0	4	0

Athlete 1	Score	Athlete 2
28 July, 19:40
Sung Ji-hyun (KOR)	21–8; 21–5	Sara Blengsli Kværnø (NOR)
29 July, 14:19
Yip Pui Yin (HKG)	21–8; 21–7	Sara Blengsli Kværnø (NOR)
30 July, 13:05
Sung Ji-hyun (KOR)	18–21; 21–23	Yip Pui Yin (HKG)

==== Group K ====
Athlete	Pld	W	L	SW	SL	Pts
Tai Tzu-ying (TPE)	2	2	0	4	0	2
Anu Nieminen (FIN)	2	1	1	2	2	1
Victoria Montero (MEX)	2	0	2	0	4	0

Athlete 1	Score	Athlete 2
28 July, 13:09
Victoria Montero (MEX)	12–21; 18–21	Anu Nieminen (FIN)
30 July, 12:30
Tai Tzu-ying (TPE)	21–11; 21–14	Anu Nieminen (FIN)
31 July, 09:07
Tai Tzu-ying (TPE)	21–6; 21–10	Victoria Montero (MEX)

==== Group L ====
Athlete	Pld	W	L	SW	SL	Pts
Li Xuerui (CHN)	2	2	0	4	0	2
Carolina Marín (ESP)	2	1	1	2	2	1
Claudia Rivero (PER)	2	0	2	0	4	0

Athlete 1	Score	Athlete 2
28 July, 13:05
Li Xuerui (CHN)	21–5; 21–6	Claudia Rivero (PER)
29 July, 19:05
Li Xuerui (CHN)	21–13; 21–11	Carolina Marín (ESP)
30 July, 20:19
Carolina Marín (ESP)	21–17; 21–7	Claudia Rivero (PER)

==== Group M ====
Athlete	Pld	W	L	SW	SL	Pts
Ratchanok Intanon (THA)	2	2	0	4	0	2
Telma Santos (POR)	2	1	1	2	2	1
Thilini Jayasinghe (SRI)	2	0	2	0	4	0

Athlete 1	Score	Athlete 2
29 July, 9:00
Ratchanok Intanon (THA)	21–13; 21–5	Thilini Jayasinghe (SRI)
30 July, 13:42
Telma Santos (POR)	21–9; 21–11	Thilini Jayasinghe (SRI)
31 July, 13:42
Ratchanok Intanon (THA)	21–12; 21–6	Telma Santos (POR)

==== Group N ====
Athlete	Pld	W	L	SW	SL	Pts
Juliane Schenk (GER)	2	2	0	4	0	2
Kristína Gavnholt (CZE)	2	1	1	2	3	1
Larisa Griga (UKR)	2	0	2	1	4	0

Athlete 1	Score	Athlete 2
28 July, 20:52
Juliane Schenk (GER)	21–18; 21–14	Kristína Gavnholt (CZE)
29 July, 19:44
Larisa Griga (UKR)	13–21; 21–15; 15–21	Kristína Gavnholt (CZE)
30 July, 20:17
Juliane Schenk (GER)	21–12; 21–14	Larisa Griga (UKR)

==== Group O ====
Athlete	Pld	W	L	SW	SL	Pts
Adriyanti Firdasari (INA)	2	2	0	4	1	2
Petya Nedelcheva (BUL)	2	1	1	2	2	1
Alesia Zaitsava (BLR)	2	0	2	1	4	0

Athlete 1	Score	Athlete 2
29 July, 18:30
Petya Nedelcheva (BUL)	21–7; 21–19	Alesia Zaitsava (BLR)
30 July, 9:09
Adriyanti Firdasari (INA)	21–10; 16–21; 21–14	Alesia Zaitsava (BLR)
31 July, 19:05
Petya Nedelcheva (BUL)	10–21; 15–21	Adriyanti Firdasari (INA)

==== Group P ====
Athlete	Pld	W	L	SW	SL	Pts
Wang Xin (CHN)	1	1	0	2	0	1
Rena Wang (USA)	1	0	1	0	2	0

30 July, 8:30
Athlete 1	Score	Athlete 2
Wang Xin (CHN)	21–8; 21–6	Rena Wang (USA)

=== Knockout ===
Round of 16
A1	Wang Yihan (CHN)	15	21	21
B1	Bae Yeon-ju (KOR)	21	14	14
C1	Cheng Shao-chieh (TPE)	21	21
D1	Gu Juan (SIN)	18	10
E1	Saina Nehwal (IND)	21	21
F1	Yao Jie (NED)	14	16
G1	Tine Baun (DEN)	14
H1	Sayaka Sato (JPN)	15^{r}
I1	Pi Hongyan (FRA)	21	12	16
J1	Yip Pui Yin (HKG)	13	21	21
K1	Tai Tzu-ying (TPE)	16	21
L1	Li Xuerui (CHN)	21	23
M1	Ratchanok Intanon (THA)	21	21
N1	Juliane Schenk (GER)	16	15
O1	Adriyanti Firdasari (INA)	15	8
P1	Wang Xin (CHN)	21	21

Quarter-finals
A1	Wang Yihan (CHN)	21	21
C1	Cheng Shao-chieh (TPE)	14	11
E1	Saina Nehwal (IND)	21	22
G1	Tine Baun (DEN)	15	20
J1	Yip Pui Yin (HKG)	12	20
L1	Li Xuerui (CHN)	21	22
M1	Ratchanok Intanon (THA)	21	18	14
P1	Wang Xin (CHN)	17	21	21

Semi-finals
A1	Wang Yihan (CHN)	21	21
E1	Saina Nehwal (IND)	13	13
L1	Li Xuerui (CHN)	22	21
P1	Wang Xin (CHN)	20	18

Final
A1	Wang Yihan (CHN)	15	23	17
L1	Li Xuerui (CHN)	21	21	21
Third place
E1	Saina Nehwal (IND)	18	0
P1	Wang Xin (CHN)	21	1^{r}
