= Kristīne Šefere =

Latvian badminton player (born 1981)

Personal information
- Born: 4 December 1981 (age 44) Riga, Latvia
- Height: 1.65 m (5 ft 5 in)
- Weight: 54 kg (119 lb)

Sport
- Country: Latvia
- Sport: Badminton
- Handedness: Right
- Coached by: Arnis Šefers

Women's
- Highest ranking: 134 (WS) 19 May 2016; 100 (WD) 15 Sep 2011; 127 (XD) 9 Jun 2016
- BWF profile

Kristīne Šefere (born 4 December 1981) is a Latvian female badminton player. She is the most successful Latvian badminton player, winning 66 Latvian champion titles, including 53 individual titles (singles, doubles, mixed doubles) and 13 team titles.

== Achievements ==
=== BWF International Challenge/Series ===
Women's doubles
Year	Tournament	Partner	Opponent	Score	Result
2015	Morocco International	(Latvia) Ieva Pope	(Jordan) Domou Amro (Jordan) Mazahreh Leina Fehmi	23–21, 21–13	(gold) Winner
2006	Lithuanian International	(Lithuania) Akvilė Stapušaitytė	(Russia) Anastasia Prokopenko (Russia) Elena Chernyavskaya	10–21, 21–15, 14–21	(silver) Runner-up
2001	Lithuanian International	(Latvia) Margarita Miķelsone	(Lithuania) Erika Milikauskaite (Lithuania) Karosaite Neringa	9–15, 6–15	(silver) Runner-up
2000	Lithuanian International	(Latvia) Margarita Miķelsone	(Lithuania) Karosaite Neringa (Lithuania) Ugne Urbonaite	15–7, 15–9	(gold) Winner

BWF International Challenge tournament
BWF International Series tournament
BWF Future Series tournament
