= Margarita Miķelsone =

Latvian badminton player (born 1982)

Personal information
- Born: 27 March 1982 (age 44) Riga, Latvia
- Height: 1.68 m (5 ft 6 in)

Sport
- Country: Latvia
- Sport: Badminton
- Handedness: Right
- Event: Women's singles & doubles

Women's singles & doubles
- BWF profile

Margarita Miķelsone (born 27 March 1982) is a Latvian badminton player. She has won ten National Championships titles, once in the singles and mixed doubles events, and eight in the women's doubles event.

== Achievements ==
=== IBF International ===
Women's doubles
Year	Tournament	Partner	Opponent	Score	Result
2001	Lithuanian International	(Latvia) Kristīne Šefere	(Lithuania) Erika Milikauskaite (Lithuania) Karosaite Neringa	9–15, 6–15	(silver) Runner-up
2000	Lithuanian International	(Latvia) Kristīne Šefere	(Lithuania) Karosaite Neringa (Lithuania) Ugne Urbonaite	15–7, 15–9	(gold) Winner
