= Sara Blengsli Kværnø =

Norwegian badminton player (born 1982)

Personal information
- Born: 28 July 1982 (age 43) Namsos Municipality, Norway
- Height: 1.72 m (5 ft 8 in)

Sport
- Country: Norway
- Sport: Badminton
- Handedness: Right
- Coached by: Salim Sameon
- Event: Women's singles

Women's singles
- BWF profile

Sara Blengsli Kværnø (born 28 July 1982) is a Norwegian badminton player, born in Namsos Municipality. She competed in women's singles at the 2012 Summer Olympics in London. She was ranked 104th in the world when entering the 2012 Summer Olympics. She was the first female badminton player to represent Norway at the Olympics.
