= 1998 Thomas & Uber Cup squads =

This article lists the squads for the 1998 Thomas & Uber Cup participating teams. The age listed for each player is on 16 May 1998 which was the first day of the tournament.

== Thomas Cup ==
=== Group A ===
==== China ====
Ten players represented China in the 1998 Thomas Cup.

Name	DoB/Age
Sun Jun	16 June 1975 (aged 22)
Luo Yigang	22 March 1975 (aged 23)
Dong Jiong	20 August 1973 (aged 24)
Chen Gang	27 June 1976 (aged 21)
Liu Yong	12 August 1975 (aged 22)
Zhang Wei	2 February 1977 (aged 21)
Yu Jinhao	12 November 1975 (aged 22)
Tao Xiaoqiang	29 November 1973 (aged 24)
Yang Ming	15 June 1974 (aged 23)
Zhang Jun	26 November 1977 (aged 20)

==== Denmark ====
Ten players represented Denmark in the 1998 Thomas Cup.

Name	DoB/Age
Peter Gade	14 December 1976 (aged 21)
Poul-Erik Høyer Larsen	20 September 1965 (aged 32)
Peter Rasmussen	2 August 1974 (aged 23)
Kenneth Jonassen	3 July 1974 (aged 23)
Michael Søgaard	4 February 1969 (aged 29)
Jon Holst-Christensen	16 June 1968 (aged 29)
Jesper Larsen	29 October 1972 (aged 25)
Jens Eriksen	30 December 1969 (aged 28)
Jim Laugesen	10 November 1974 (aged 23)
Thomas Stavngaard	7 September 1974 (aged 23)

==== Sweden ====
Ten players represented Sweden in the 1998 Thomas Cup.

Name	DoB/Age
Henrik Bengtsson	9 October 1973 (aged 24)
Rickard Magnusson	10 January 1971 (aged 27)
Jens Olsson	15 December 1964 (aged 33)
Tomas Johansson	12 August 1969 (aged 28)
Daniel Eriksson	24 July 1975 (aged 22)
Rasmus Wengberg	2 December 1974 (aged 23)
Frederik Bergström	19 March 1975 (aged 23)
Henrik Andersson	19 January 1977 (aged 21)
Pär-Gunnar Jönsson	6 August 1963 (aged 34)
Peter Axelsson	22 June 1967 (aged 30)

==== Hong Kong ====
Ten players represented Hong Kong in the 1998 Thomas Cup.

Name	DoB/Age
Tam Kai Chuen	6 September 1976 (aged 21)
Ng Wei	14 July 1981 (aged 16)
Liu Kwok Wa	15 February 1978 (aged 20)
Tam Lok Tin	26 September 1976 (aged 21)
Wong Nam Wah	30 June 1976 (aged 21)
Ma Che Kong	25 May 1974 (aged 23)
Yau Kwun Yuen	17 July 1976 (aged 21)
Chow Kin Man	13 October 1970 (aged 27)
Ma Chi Wai	19 October 1975 (aged 22)
Wong Tsz Yin	8 August 1976 (aged 21)

=== Group B ===
==== Indonesia ====
Ten players represented Indonesia in the 1998 Thomas Cup.

Name	DoB/Age
Hariyanto Arbi	27 January 1972 (aged 26)
Hendrawan	27 June 1972 (aged 25)
Marleve Mainaky	26 March 1972 (aged 26)
Indra Wijaya	16 March 1974 (aged 24)
Joko Suprianto	21 January 1966 (aged 32)
Ricky Subagja	27 January 1971 (aged 27)
Rexy Mainaky	9 March 1968 (aged 30)
Candra Wijaya	16 September 1975 (aged 22)
Sigit Budiarto	24 November 1975 (aged 22)
Tony Gunawan	9 April 1975 (aged 23)

==== Malaysia ====
Nine players represented Malaysia in the 1998 Thomas Cup. Rashid Sidek was named to the team but withdrew from the squad for personal reasons.

Name	DoB/Age
Ong Ewe Hock	14 March 1972 (aged 26)
Yong Hock Kin	14 June 1974 (aged 23)
Roslin Hashim	23 October 1975 (aged 22)
Wong Choong Hann	17 February 1977 (aged 21)
Cheah Soon Kit	9 January 1968 (aged 30)
Yap Kim Hock	2 August 1970 (aged 27)
Choong Tan Fook	6 February 1976 (aged 22)
Lee Wan Wah	24 November 1975 (aged 22)
Tan Kim Her	11 November 1971 (aged 26)
~~Rashid Sidek~~	8 July 1968 (aged 29)

==== South Korea ====
Nine players represented South Korea in the 1998 Thomas Cup.

Name	DoB/Age
Hwang Sun-ho	21 April 1975 (aged 23)
Jang Chun-woong	24 April 1975 (aged 23)
Jun Jong-bae	4 January 1976 (aged 22)
Ahn Jae-chang	1 October 1972 (aged 25)
Kim Dong-moon	22 September 1975 (aged 22)
Ha Tae-kwon	30 April 1975 (aged 23)
Lee Dong-soo	7 June 1974 (aged 23)
Yoo Yong-sung	25 October 1974 (aged 23)
Kang Kyung-jin	24 March 1973 (aged 25)

==== Netherlands ====
Eight players represented the Netherlands in the 1998 Thomas Cup.

Name	DoB/Age
Jeroen van Dijk	26 April 1971 (aged 27)
Dicky Palyama	26 December 1978 (aged 19)
Gerben Bruijstens	31 December 1974 (aged 23)
Joris van Soerland	15 October 1972 (aged 25)
Quinten van Dalm	26 June 1972 (aged 25)
Dennis Lens	25 September 1977 (aged 20)
Norbert van Barneveld	11 July 1973 (aged 24)
Jurgen van Leeuwen	27 November 1974 (aged 23)

== Uber Cup ==
=== Group A ===
==== China ====
Ten players represented China in the 1998 Uber Cup.

Name	DoB/Age
Ye Zhaoying	7 May 1974 (aged 24)
Gong Zhichao	15 December 1977 (aged 20)
Dai Yun	22 November 1977 (aged 20)
Han Jingna	16 January 1975 (aged 23)
Ge Fei	9 October 1975 (aged 22)
Gu Jun	3 January 1975 (aged 23)
Qin Yiyuan	14 February 1973 (aged 25)
Tang Yongshu	5 January 1975 (aged 23)
Qian Hong	13 June 1976 (aged 21)
Liu Lu	19 March 1977 (aged 21)

==== Denmark ====
Ten players represented Denmark in the 1998 Uber Cup.

Name	DoB/Age
Camilla Martin	23 March 1974 (aged 24)
Mette Pedersen	30 September 1973 (aged 24)
Mette Sørensen	28 May 1975 (aged 22)
Anne Søndergaard	5 June 1973 (aged 24)
Pernille Harder	3 September 1977 (aged 20)
Helene Kirkegaard	5 May 1971 (aged 27)
Majken Vange	29 September 1975 (aged 22)
Rikke Olsen	19 April 1971 (aged 27)
Marlene Thomsen	5 May 1971 (aged 27)
Ann Jørgensen	1 October 1973 (aged 24)

==== Japan ====
Nine players represented Japan in the 1998 Uber Cup.

Name	DoB/Age
Kanako Yonekura	29 October 1976 (aged 21)
Yasuko Mizui	19 September 1975 (aged 22)
Saori Itō	19 September 1975 (aged 22)
Hiroko Nagamine	7 February 1976 (aged 22)
Satomi Igawa	24 October 1978 (aged 19)
Chihiro Ōsaka	17 November 1977 (aged 20)
Yoshiko Iwata	27 March 1971 (aged 27)
Haruko Matsuda	11 January 1972 (aged 26)
Akiko Nakashima	7 June 1977 (aged 20)

==== Hong Kong ====
Ten players represented Hong Kong in the 1998 Uber Cup.

Name	DoB/Age
Koon Wai Chee	26 July 1980 (aged 17)
Ling Wan Ting	24 November 1980 (aged 17)
Ng Ching	5 April 1977 (aged 21)
Chan Mei Mei	5 February 1978 (aged 20)
Elyni Jie	21 March 1980 (aged 18)
Kwok Sau Man	1979 (aged 18–19)
Yang Ching	28 July 1979 (aged 18)
Wong Chun Fan	23 September 1969 (aged 28)
Tung Chau Man	14 October 1972 (aged 25)
Ng Ka Shun	21 September 1983 (aged 14)

=== Group B ===
==== Indonesia ====
Ten players represented Indonesia in the 1998 Uber Cup.

Name	DoB/Age
Susi Susanti	11 February 1971 (aged 27)
Mia Audina	22 August 1979 (aged 18)
Meiluawati	25 May 1975 (aged 22)
Ellen Angelina	30 June 1976 (aged 21)
Cindana	8 June 1976 (aged 21)
Zelin Resiana	9 July 1972 (aged 25)
Eliza Nathanael	27 May 1973 (aged 24)
Indarti Isoliana	10 February 1976 (aged 22)
Deyana Lomban	27 January 1976 (aged 22)
Finarsih	8 February 1972 (aged 26)

==== South Korea ====
Nine players represented South Korea in the 1998 Uber Cup.

Name	DoB/Age
Kim Ji Hyun	10 September 1974 (aged 23)
Lee Joo-hyun	13 March 1974 (aged 24)
Lee Kyung-won	21 January 1980 (aged 18)
Lee Soon-deuk	28 February 1979 (aged 19)
Ra Kyung-min	25 November 1976 (aged 21)
Chung Jae-hee	6 April 1978 (aged 20)
Kim Shin Young	10 July 1975 (aged 22)
Kim Mee-hyang	1 October 1973 (aged 24)
Jang Hye-ock	9 February 1977 (aged 21)

==== Netherlands ====
Eight players represented the Netherlands in the 1998 Uber Cup.

Name	DoB/Age
Judith Meulendijks	26 September 1978 (aged 19)
Brenda Beenhakker	18 February 1977 (aged 21)
Lonneke Janssen	25 March 1976 (aged 22)
Carolien Glebbeek	12 April 1973 (aged 25)
Monique Hoogland	25 August 1967 (aged 30)
Nicole van Hooren	11 June 1973 (aged 24)
Erica van den Heuvel	12 June 1966 (aged 31)
Lotte Jonathans	17 September 1977 (aged 20)

==== England ====
Eight players represented England in the 1998 Uber Cup.

Name	DoB/Age
Julia Mann	9 August 1971 (aged 26)
Rebecca Pantaney	7 October 1975 (aged 22)
Donna Kellogg	20 January 1978 (aged 20)
Tracey Hallam	24 March 1975 (aged 23)
Tracy Dineen	2 May 1970 (aged 28)
Sarah Hardaker	1 December 1975 (aged 22)
Joanne Goode	17 November 1972 (aged 25)
Joanne Davies	10 September 1972 (aged 25)
