= 1999 IBF World Championships – Men's singles =

Badminton championships

Men's singles at the 1999 IBF World Championships
- Venue: Brøndby Arena
- Location: Copenhagen, Denmark
- Dates: May 10, 1999 – May 23, 1999

Medalists
gold medal	Sun Jun	China
silver medal	Fung Permadi	Chinese Taipei
bronze medal	Peter Gade	Denmark
bronze medal	Poul-Erik Høyer Larsen	Denmark

The 1999 IBF World Championships (World Badminton Championships) were held in Copenhagen, Denmark, between 10 May and 23 May 1999. Following the results of the men's singles.

== Seeds ==
1. (Denmark) Peter Gade
2. (China) Sun Jun
3. (Chinese Taipei) Fung Permadi
4. (Denmark) Poul-Erik Høyer Larsen

== Main stage ==
=== Section 1 ===
First round
(China) Sun Jun	15	15
(Portugal) Ricardo Fernandes	4	5
(Sweden) Rasmus Wengberg	15	15
(Poland) Przemyslaw Wacha	6	7
(Indonesia) Taufik Hidayat	15	15
(Thailand) Boonsak Ponsana	6	10
(France) Bertrand Gallet	15	15
(England) Richard Doling	6	7
(Denmark) Thomas Stuer-Lauridsen	15	15
(Chinese Taipei) Chien Yu-hsiu	9	10
(Netherlands) Dicky Palyama	10	15	15
(Canada) Mike Beres	15	3	12
(Japan) Keita Masuda	12	15	15
(Finland) Jyri Aalto	15	8	8
(Ukraine) Vladislav Druzchenko	15	15
(Malaysia) Ong Ewe Hock	13	3

Second round
(China) Sun Jun	15	15
(Sweden) Rasmus Wengberg	8	3
(Indonesia) Taufik Hidayat	15	15
(France) Bertrand Gallet	10	5
(Denmark) Thomas Stuer-Lauridsen	15	15
(Netherlands) Dicky Palyama	12	9
(Japan) Keita Masuda	7	15	15
(Ukraine) Vladislav Druzchenko	15	13	9

Third round
(China) Sun Jun	7	15	15
(Indonesia) Taufik Hidayat	15	6	6
(Denmark) Thomas Stuer-Lauridsen	17	15
(Japan) Keita Masuda	14	5

Quarterfinals
(China) Sun Jun	15	15
(Denmark) Thomas Stuer-Lauridsen	5	13

=== Section 2 ===
First round
(Denmark) Poul-Erik Høyer Larsen	17	15
(Indonesia) Rio Suryana	14	5
(England) Peter Knowles	15	15
(Slovenia) Andrej Pohar	6	3
(Malaysia) Rashid Sidek	15	9	15
(Sweden) Rikard Magnusson	12	15	4
(Norway) Jim Ronny Andersen	15	15
(Netherlands) Gerben Bruijstens	13	13
(Indonesia) Hendrawan	15	15
(South Korea) Park Tae-sang	12	9
(Hong Kong) Tam Kai Chuen	15	15
(Switzerland) Thomas Wapp	2	4
(Indonesia) Ardy Wiranata	15	13	15
(Austria) Jürgen Koch	3	15	1
(China) Dong Jiong	15	15
(Germany) Oliver Pongratz	10	9

Second round
(Denmark) Poul-Erik Høyer Larsen	15	15
(England) Peter Knowles	8	8
(Malaysia) Rashid Sidek	15	15
(Norway) Jim Ronny Andersen	6	5
(Indonesia) Hendrawan	13	15	15
(Hong Kong) Tam Kai Chuen	15	8	14
(Indonesia) Ardy Wiranata	5	15	15
(China) Dong Jiong	15	11	14

Third round
(Denmark) Poul-Erik Høyer Larsen	15	15
(Malaysia) Rashid Sidek	6	8
(Indonesia) Hendrawan	15	15
(Indonesia) Ardy Wiranata	13	10

Quarterfinals
(Denmark) Poul-Erik Høyer Larsen	8	15	15
(Indonesia) Hendrawan	15	4	4

=== Section 3 ===
First round
(Chinese Taipei) Fung Permadi	15	12	15
(Netherlands) Jeroen van Dijk	9	15	3
(Belgium) Ruud Kuijten	15	15
(Mexico) Arturo Amaya	3	4
(Malaysia) Wong Choong Hann	15	15
(France) Jean-Frederic Massias	11	8
(South Korea) Shon Seung-mo	15	15
(Germany) Ian Maywald	8	9
(Denmark) Kenneth Jonassen	15	15
(Russia) Pavel Uvarov	6	5
(England) Colin Haughton	3	15	15
(Japan) Fumihiko Machida	15	8	5
(Indonesia) Budi Santoso	15	15
(Kazakhstan) Maxim Kruglik	10	8
(China) Chen Hong	15	15
(Sweden) Thomas Johansson	8	6

Second round
(Chinese Taipei) Fung Permadi	15	15
(Belgium) Ruud Kuijten	10	8
(Malaysia) Wong Choong Hann	15	14	15
(South Korea) Shon Seung-mo	8	17	1
(Denmark) Kenneth Jonassen	3	15	15
(England) Colin Haughton	15	8	5
(Indonesia) Budi Santoso	8	15	15
(China) Chen Hong	8	15	4

Third round
(Chinese Taipei) Fung Permadi	15	15
(Malaysia) Wong Choong Hann	7	7
(Denmark) Kenneth Jonassen	15	10	15
(Indonesia) Budi Santoso	11	15	5

Quarterfinals
(Chinese Taipei) Fung Permadi	15	12	15
(Denmark) Kenneth Jonassen	13	15	10

=== Section 4 ===
First round
(Denmark) Peter Gade	15	15
(South Korea) Ahn Jae-chang	3	7
(Indonesia) Heryanto Arbi	15	15
(Spain) Sergio Llopis	5	6
(Malaysia) Yong Hock Kin	15	15
(Hong Kong) Ng Wei	4	3
(Austria) Heimo Götschl	15	15	15
(Iceland) Sveinn Solvason	17	2	9
(Denmark) Peter Rasmussen	15	15
(United States) Kevin Han	8	3
(Sweden) Daniel Eriksson	15	15
(Japan) Tadashi Ohtsuka	9	4
(China) Chen Gang	15	5	15
(India) Pullela Gopichand	12	15	10
(Netherlands) Tjitte Weistra	15	15
(Thailand) Anupap Thiraratsakul	13	9

Second round
(Denmark) Peter Gade	15	15
(Indonesia) Heryanto Arbi	6	3
(Malaysia) Yong Hock Kin	15	15
(Austria) Heimo Götschl	0	1
(Denmark) Peter Rasmussen	15	15
(Sweden) Daniel Eriksson	5	3
(China) Chen Gang	15	15
(Netherlands) Tjitte Weistra	3	8

Third round
(Denmark) Peter Gade	15	15
(Malaysia) Yong Hock Kin	9	3
(Denmark) Peter Rasmussen	3	15	17
(China) Chen Gang	15'	15	15

Quarterfinals
(Denmark) Peter Gade	15	15
(Denmark) Peter Rasmussen	4	13

== Final stage ==
Quarterfinals
(China) Sun Jun	15	15
(Denmark) Thomas Stuer-Lauridsen	5	13
(Denmark) Poul-Erik Høyer Larsen	8	15	15
(Indonesia) Hendrawan	15	4	4
(Chinese Taipei) Fung Permadi	15	12	15
(Denmark) Kenneth Jonassen	13	15	10
(Denmark) Peter Gade	15	15
(Denmark) Peter Rasmussen	4	13

Semifinals
(China) Sun Jun	15	15
(Denmark) Poul-Erik Høyer Larsen	4	6
(Chinese Taipei) Fung Permadi	15	1	15
(Denmark) Peter Gade	11	15	14

Finals
(China) Sun Jun	15	15
(Chinese Taipei) Fung Permadi	6	13
