= 1998 All England Open Badminton Championships =

1998 All England Championships
Tournament details
- Dates: 9 March 1998– 14 March 1998
- Edition: 88th
- Location: Birmingham

The 1998 Yonex All England Open was the 88th edition of the All England Open Badminton Championships. It was held from 9 to 14 March 1998, in Birmingham, England.

It was a five-star tournament, and the prize money was US$200,000.

== Venue ==
- National Indoor Arena

== Final results ==
Category	Winners	Runners-up	Score
Men's singles	(China) Sun Jun	(Malaysia) Ong Ewe Hock	15–1, 15–7
Women's singles	(China) Ye Zhaoying	(China) Zhang Ning	11–5, 11–8
Men's doubles	(South Korea) Lee Dong-soo & Yoo Yong-sung	(Indonesia) Tony Gunawan & Candra Wijaya	15–10, 15–10
Women's doubles	(China) Ge Fei & Gu Jun	(South Korea) Jang Hye-ock & Ra Kyung-min	15–7, 15–7
Mixed doubles	(South Korea) Kim Dong-moon & Ra Kyung-min	(Denmark) Michael Søgaard & Rikke Olsen	15–2, 11–15, 15–5

== Men's singles ==
=== Section 1 ===
Round of 32
(China) Sun Jun	15	15
(Netherlands) Dicky Palyama	3	5
(Malaysia) Wong Choong Hann	15	15
(England) Darren Hall	11	1
(South Korea) Yong Hock Kin	15	15
(Ukraine) Konstantin Tatranov	4	1
(India) Pullela Gopichand	15	15
(Denmark) Kasper Fangel	4	1
(China) Luo Yigang	10	15	15
(Denmark) Niels Christian Kaldau	15	5	1
(Malaysia) Rashid Sidek	15	15
(England) Mark Constable	7	3
(China) Chen Hong	15	15
(Indonesia) Indra Wijaya	7	13
(Denmark) Poul-Erik Høyer Larsen	15	15
(Belgium) Ruud Kuijten	4	7

Round of 16
(China) Sun Jun	15	15
(Malaysia) Wong	2	8
(South Korea) Hock Kin	15	15
(India) Pullela	8	5
(China) Yigang	15	15
(Malaysia) Sidek	3	5
(China) Chen Hong	15	15
(Denmark) Høyer Larsen	10	7

Quarter-finals
(China) Sun Jun	15	15
(South Korea) Hock Kin	4	2
(China) Yigang	15	15
(China) Chen Hong	2	5

Semi-finals
(China) Sun Jun	15	15
(China) Yigang	5	2

=== Section 2 ===
Round of 32
(Malaysia) Ong Ewe Hock	15	15
(India) Abhinn Shyam Gupta	4	4
(Denmark) Peter Gade	15	15
(Chinese Taipei) Fung Permadi	5	13
(Indonesia) Hariyanto Arbi	15	15
(Malaysia) Jason Wong	3	2
(China) Chen Gang	8	15	15
(Denmark) Anders Boesen	15	8	3
(Indonesia) Hendrawan	15	15	18
(Denmark) Peter Janum	17	5	15
(Malaysia) Saman Ismail	15	15
(Denmark) Thomas Søgaard	5	7
(Netherlands) Jeroen van Dijk	15	18
(Japan) Shinji Ohta	5	13
(Indonesia) Ardy Wiranata	11	15	15
(Malaysia) Muhammad Roslin Hashim	15	11	7

Round of 16
(Malaysia) Hock	8	15	15
(Denmark) Gade	15	8	9
(Indonesia) Arbi	17	15
(China) Chen Gang	14	11
(Indonesia) Hendrawan	10	15	15
(Malaysia) Ismail	15	6	2
(Netherlands) Van Dijk	15	12	14
(Indonesia) Wiranata	10	15	13

Quarter-finals
(Malaysia) Hock	17	15
(Indonesia) Arbi	15	6
(Indonesia) Hendrawan	w/o
(Netherlands) Van Dijk	scr

Semi-finals
(Malaysia) Hock	13	15	15
(Indonesia) Hendrawan	15	5	6

== Women's singles ==
=== Section 1 ===
Round of 32
(China) Ye Zhaoying	11	11
(Russia) Ella Karachkova	3	8
(South Korea) Lee Joo-hyun	7	11	11
(Japan) Saori Itoh	11	6	2
(Japan) Yasuko Mizui	11	11
(Denmark) Anne Sondergaard	0	5
(Indonesia) Mia Audina	11	11
(Japan) Chihiro Ohsaka	4	1
(Denmark) Camilla Martin	11	11
(Scotland) Sandra Watt	1	1
(Indonesia) Meiluawati	11	11
(Japan) Miho Tanaka	4	3
(China) Wang Chen	11	11
(Denmark) Tine Rasmussen	6	8
(New Zealand) Rhona Robertson	11	11
(India) Neelima Choudhary	4	1

Round of 16
(China) Zhaoying	11	11
(South Korea) Joo-hyun	3	6
(Japan) Mizui	8	4
(Indonesia) Audina	11	11
(Denmark) Martin	11	11
(Indonesia) Meiluawati	2	4
(China) Wang Chen	11	11
(New Zealand) Robertson	6	5

Quarter-finals
(China) Zhaoying	11	11
(Indonesia) Audina	5	8
(Denmark) Martin	11	11
(China) Wang Chen	3	9

Semi-finals
(China) Zhaoying	4	11	11
(Denmark) Martin	11	8	3

=== Section 2 ===
Round of 32
(China) Zhang Ning	11	11
(Finland) Anu Weckström	0	1
(Indonesia) Susi Susanti	8	11	11
(Japan) Kanako Yonekura	11	2	3
(China) Dai Yun	11	11
(Taiwan) Chiu-Yin Lin	3	2
(Denmark) Mette Pedersen	11	12
(India) Aparna Popat	1	10
(China) Gong Zhichao	11	11
(Denmark) Mette Sørensen	6	4
(Wales) Kelly Morgan	11	11
(Malaysia) Pei Pei Law	0	4
(South Korea) Kim Ji-hyun	11	11
(Netherlands) Lonneke Janssen	7	4
(Japan) Takako Ida	11	11
(Canada) Kara Solmundson	1	4

Round of 16
(China) Zhang Ning	5	11	11
(Indonesia) Susanti	11	2	6
(China) Dai Yun	12	7	11
(Denmark) Pedersen	9	11	1
(China) Zhichao	11	11
(Wales) Morgan	4	7
(South Korea) Ji-hyun	12	11
(Japan) Ida	11	7

Quarter-finals
(China) Zhang Ning	10	11	11
(China) Dai Jun	12	6	7
(China) Zhichao	11	11
(South Korea) Ji-hyun	3	2

Semi-finals
(China) Zhang Ning	12	11
(China) Zhichao	10	8
