= 1997 IBF World Championships – Men's singles =

Badminton championships

Men's singles at the 1997 IBF World Championships
- Venue: Scotstoun Centre
- Location: Glasgow, Scotland
- Dates: May 24, 1997 – June 1, 1997

Medalists
gold medal	Peter Rasmussen	Denmark
silver medal	Sun Jun	China
bronze medal	Heryanto Arbi	Indonesia
bronze medal	Poul-Erik Høyer Larsen	Denmark

The 10th IBF World Championships (Badminton) were held in Glasgow, Scotland, between 24 May and 1 June 1997. Following the results of the men's singles.

== Seeds ==
1. (China) Dong Jiong
2. (Denmark) Poul-Erik Høyer Larsen
3. (China) Sun Jun
4. (Indonesia) Indra Wijaya
5. (Indonesia) Joko Suprianto
6. (Malaysia) Ong Ewe Hock
7. (Chinese Taipei) Fung Permadi
8. (South Korea) Park Sung-woo
9. (Indonesia) Budi Santoso
10. (Denmark) Thomas Stuer-Lauridsen
11. (Denmark) Peter Gade
12. (Indonesia) Heryanto Arbi
13. (Indonesia) Allan Budi Kusuma
14. (China) Luo Yigang
15. (Denmark) Peter Rasmussen

== Main stage ==
=== Section 1 ===
First round
(Denmark) Peter Rasmussen	15	15
(Thailand) Apichai Thiraratsakul	7	6
(China) Lin Liwen	15	15
(Belarus) Mikhail Korshuk	5	1
(Indonesia) Indra Wijaya	15	4	15
(Finland) Pontus Jäntti	3	15	11
(England) Mark Constable	3	15	15
(Hong Kong) Tam Lok Tin	15	9	10
(South Korea) Park Sung-woo	15	15
(Pakistan) Mohammed Saqib Majeed	6	8
(Netherlands) Dicky Palyama	15	11	15
(Japan) Keita Masuda	9	15	11
(Indonesia) Allan Budi Kusuma	15	15
(India) Vikrant Patwardhan	8	1
(Sweden) Henrik Bengtsson	15	15
(Portugal) Marco Vasconcelos	1	7

Second round
(Denmark) Peter Rasmussen	15	15
(China) Lin Liwen	7	1
(Indonesia) Indra Wijaya	15	15
(England) Mark Constable	3	11
(South Korea) Park Sung-woo	15	15
(Netherlands) Dicky Palyama	5	9
(Indonesia) Allan Budi Kusuma	15	15
(Sweden) Henrik Bengtsson	9	5

Third round
(Denmark) Peter Rasmussen	8	15	15
(Indonesia) Indra Wijaya	8	15	1
(South Korea) Park Sung-woo	17	15
(Indonesia) Allan Budi Kusuma	13	4

Quarterfinals
(Denmark) Peter Rasmussen	15	18
(South Korea) Park Sung-woo	2	17

=== Section 2 ===
First round
(Indonesia) Heryanto Arbi	15	15
(Austria) Jürgen Koch	1	6
(Canada) Mike Beres	15	13	15
(Chinese Taipei) Chien Yu-Hsiu	9	13
(Malaysia) Ong Ewe Hock	13	15	15
(Ukraine) Vladislav Druzchenko	18	4	12
(England) Darren Hall	15	15
(Scotland) Bruce Flockhart	5	11
(Denmark) Thomas Stuer-Lauridsen	15	18
(Sweden) Thomas Johansson	13	15
(Netherlands) Jeroen van Dijk	15	15
(Slovenia) Andrej Pohar	10	9
(China) Dong Jiong	15	15
(Chinese Taipei) Jang Chun Woong	6	3
(Russia) Pavel Uvarov	18	12	15
(Germany) Detlef Poste	13	15	12

Second round
(Indonesia) Heryanto Arbi	15	15
(Canada) Mike Beres	4	9
(Malaysia) Ong Ewe Hock	18	15
(England) Darren Hall	13	6
(Denmark) Thomas Stuer-Lauridsen	18	15
(Netherlands) Jeroen van Dijk	16	5
(China) Dong Jiong	15	15
(Russia) Pavel Uvarov	11	5

Third round
(Indonesia) Heryanto Arbi	15	15
(Malaysia) Ong Ewe Hock	12	8
(Denmark) Thomas Stuer-Lauridsen	w.o.
(China) Dong Jiong

Quarterfinals
(Indonesia) Heryanto Arbi	10	15	15
(Denmark) Thomas Stuer-Lauridsen	15	6	1

=== Section 3 ===
First round
(China) Sun Jun	15	15
(Wales) Richard Vaughan	5	2
(South Korea) Hwang Sun-ho	15	15
(New Zealand) Nick Hall	11	9
(Indonesia) Budi Santoso	9	15	15
(England) Peter Knowles	15	11	0
(Sweden) Rikard Magnusson	15	15
(Norway) Hans Sperre jr.	6	4
(Denmark) Peter Gade	15	15
(Netherlands) Chris Bruil	8	5
(Malaysia) Yong Hock Kin	15	15
(Italy) Klaus Raffeiner	6	2
(Chinese Taipei) Fung Permadi	15	15
(France) Bertrand Gallet	12	6
(Chinese Taipei) Chang Jeng-Shyuang	15	15
(Austria) Peter Kreulitsch	4	9

Second round
(China) Sun Jun	15	15
(South Korea) Hwang Sun-ho	9	2
(Indonesia) Budi Santoso	17	15
(Sweden) Rikard Magnusson	14	11
(Denmark) Peter Gade	4	15	15
(Malaysia) Yong Hock Kin	15	8	2
(Chinese Taipei) Fung Permadi	15	15
(Chinese Taipei) Chang Jeng-Shyuang	11	6

Third round
(China) Sun Jun	15	18
(Indonesia) Budi Santoso	10	15
(Denmark) Peter Gade	9	15	15
(Chinese Taipei) Fung Permadi	15	7	9

Quarterfinals
(China) Sun Jun	15	15
(Denmark) Peter Gade	9	11

=== Section 4 ===
First round
(Denmark) Poul-Erik Høyer Larsen	15	15
(Russia) Artur Khachaturjan	6	5
(Malaysia) Wong Choong Hann	15	15
(Bulgaria) Boris Kessov	4	1
(China) Luo Yigang	15	15
(Spain) Arturo Ruiz	7	3
(Portugal) Fernando Silva	w.o.
(India) Pullela Gopichand
(Indonesia) Joko Suprianto	15	15
(Canada) Iain Sydie	7	10
(Ukraine) Konstantin Tatranov	15	15
(Sweden) Daniel Eriksson	11	14
(United States) Kevin Han	w.o.
(Germany) Oliver Pongratz
(Hong Kong) Tam Kai Chuen	15	9	15
(England) Colin Haughton	12	15	10

Second round
(Denmark) Poul-Erik Høyer Larsen	18	15
(Malaysia) Wong Choong Hann	16	11
(China) Luo Yigang	15	9	15
(Portugal) Fernando Silva	3	15	4
(Indonesia) Joko Suprianto	15	15
(Ukraine) Konstantin Tatranov	8	11
(United States) Kevin Han	18	15
(Hong Kong) Tam Kai Chuen	13	11

Third round
(Denmark) Poul-Erik Høyer Larsen	15	15
(China) Luo Yigang	12	10
(Indonesia) Joko Suprianto	15	15
(United States) Kevin Han	5	8

Quarterfinals
(Denmark) Poul-Erik Høyer Larsen	10	15	15
(Indonesia) Joko Suprianto	15	9	5

== Final stage ==
Quarterfinals
(Denmark) Peter Rasmussen	15	18
(South Korea) Park Sung-Woo	2	17
(Indonesia) Heryanto Arbi	10	15	15
(Denmark) Thomas Stuer-Lauridsen	15	6	1
(China) Sun Jun	15	15
(Denmark) Peter Gade	9	11
(Denmark) Poul-Erik Høyer Larsen	10	15	15
(Indonesia) Joko Suprianto	15	9	5

Semifinals
(Denmark) Peter Rasmussen	9	15	15
(Indonesia) Heryanto Arbi	15	9	2
(China) Sun Jun	15	14	15
(Denmark) Poul-Erik Høyer Larsen	7	17	9

Finals
(Denmark) Peter Rasmussen	16	18	15
(China) Sun Jun	17	13	10
