= 1998 World Badminton Grand Prix Finals =

Tournament details
- Dates: 24–28 February 1999
- Edition: 16
- Total prize money: US$300,000
- Location: Bandar Seri Begawan, Brunei

The 1998 World Badminton Grand Prix was the 16th edition of the World Badminton Grand Prix finals. It was held in Bandar Seri Begawan, Brunei from February 24 to February 28, 1999. It did not take place in December as in the years before due to the collision with the 1998 Asian Games in Bangkok, Thailand. The prize money was USD300,000.

The players were qualified according to the ranking on 1 December 1998. In men's singles the first 16 players were qualified, in women's singles the first 12 and in the doubles the first eight. Margit Borg, the number 13 in the women's singles rank, could participate because the Susi Susanti was pregnant.

== Men's singles ==
=== Group A ===
Player	W	L
(Denmark) Peter Gade	3	0
(China) Chen Gang	2	1
(Malaysia) Rashid Sidek	1	2
(Sweden) Thomas Johansson	0	3

Chen Gang (China)	15–11, 15–11	(Malaysia) Rashid Sidek
Peter Gade (Denmark)	15–2, 15–10	(Sweden) Thomas Johansson
Peter Gade (Denmark)	11–15, 15–11, 15–1	(Indonesia) Rashid Sidek
Chen Gang (China)	6–15, 17–16, 15–13	(Sweden) Thomas Johansson
Peter Gade (Denmark)	15–6, 15–7	(China) Chen Gang
Rashid Sidek (Indonesia)	15–12, 13–15, 15–5	(Sweden) Thomas Johansson

=== Group B ===
Player	W	L
(Malaysia) Ong Ewe Hock	2	1
(Indonesia) Heryanto Arbi	2	1
(China) Luo Yigang	1	2
(Denmark) Kenneth Jonassen	1	2

Ong Ewe Hock (Malaysia)	15–10, 15–7	(Denmark) Kenneth Jonassen
Heryanto Arbi (Indonesia)	3–15, 17–15, 15–7	(China) Luo Yigang
Ong Ewe Hock (Malaysia)	15–11, 15–2	(Indonesia) Heryanto Arbi
Kenneth Jonassen (Denmark)	17–15, 9–15, 15–9	(China) Luo Yigang
Heryanto Arbi (Indonesia)	12–15, 15–8, 15–6	(Denmark) Kenneth Jonassen
Luo Yigang (China)	15–4, 15–1	(Malaysia) Ong Ewe Hock

=== Group C ===
Player	W	L
(Malaysia) Yong Hock Kin	3	0
(China) Dong Jiong	2	1
(Indonesia) Hendrawan	1	2
(Netherlands) Jeroen van Djik	0	3

Yong Hock Kin (Malaysia)	15–7, 15–3	(Netherlands) Jeroen van Djik
Dong Jiong (China)	15–11, 15–8	(Indonesia) Hendrawan
Yong Hock Kin (Malaysia)	15–13, 15–8	(China) Dong Jiong
Hendrawan (Indonesia)	15–1, 15–2	(Netherlands) Jeroen van Djik
Yong Hock Kin (Malaysia)	2–15, 15–13, 15–7	(Indonesia) Hendrawan
Dong Jiong (China)	15–4, 15–2	(Netherlands) Jeroen van Djik

=== Group D ===
Player	W	L
(China) Sun Jun	3	0
(Denmark) Poul-Erik Høyer Larsen	2	1
(Indonesia) Budi Santoso	1	2
(Malaysia) Roslin Hashim	0	3

Høyer Larsen (Denmark)	15–10, 15–7	(Malaysia) Roslin Hashim
Sun Jun (China)	12–15, 15–11, 15–7	(Indonesia) Budi Santoso
Sun Jun (China)	4–15, 15–3, 15–4	(Malaysia) Roslin Hashim
Høyer Larsen (Denmark)	12–15, 15–11, 15–6	(Indonesia) Budi Santoso
Sun Jun (China)	15–8, 15–4	(Denmark) Høyer Larsen
Budi Santoso (Indonesia)	15–11, 11–15, 15–11	(Malaysia) Roslin Hashim

=== Knockout stage ===
Semifinals
(Denmark) Peter Gade	w	/	o
(Malaysia) Ong Ewe Hock
(Malaysia) Yong Hock Kin	12	14
(China) Sun Jun	15	17

Final
(Denmark) Peter Gade	11	8
(China) Sun Jun	15	15

== Women's singles ==
=== Group A ===
Player	W	L
(China) Ye Zhaoying	2	0
(China) Zhou Mi	1	1
(Sweden) Karolina Ericsson	0	2

Ye Zhaoying (China)	11–3, 5–11, 11–2	(China) Zhou Mi
Zhou Mi (China)	11–2, 11–1	(Sweden) Karolina Ericsson
Ye Zhaoying (China)	11–1, 11–7	(Sweden) Karolina Ericsson

=== Group B ===
Player	W	L
(China) Zhang Ning	2	0
(Indonesia) Mia Audina	1	1
(Denmark) Mette Pedersen	0	2

Mia Audina (Indonesia)	11–4, 11–0	(Denmark) Mette Pedersen
Zhang Ning (China)	11–0, 11–5	(Denmark) Mette Pedersen
Zhang Ning (China)	11–2, 9–11, 11–3	(Indonesia) Mia Audina

=== Group C ===
Player	W	L
(China) Dai Yun	2	0
(Denmark) Camilla Martin	1	1
(Sweden) Margit Borg	0	2

Camilla Martin (Denmark)	11–13, 11–1, 11–7	(Sweden) Margit Borg
Dai Yun (China)	6–11, 11–3, 11–3	(Sweden) Margit Borg
Dai Yun (China)	13–11, 11–6	(Denmark) Camilla Martin

=== Group D ===
Player	W	L
(China) Gong Zhichao	2	0
(Wales) Kelly Morgan	1	1
(Japan) Yasuko Mizui	0	2

Gong Zhichao (China)	11–3, 11–5	(Wales) Kelly Morgan
Kelly Morgan (Wales)	4–11, 11–7, 11–5	(Japan) Yasuko Mizui
Gong Zhichao (China)	11–6, 11–1	(Japan) Yasuko Mizui

=== Knockout stage ===
Semifinals
(China) Ye Zhaoying	5	11	8
(China) Zhang Ning	11	8	11
(China) Dai Yun	11	11
(China) Gong Zhichao	0	6

Final
(China) Zhang Ning	11	11
(China) Dai Yun	8	7

== Men's doubles ==
Semifinals
(Indonesia) Flandy Limpele (Indonesia) Eng Hian	11	9
(Indonesia) Tony Gunawan (Indonesia) Halim Haryanto	15	15
(Indonesia) Ricky Subagja (Indonesia) Rexy Mainaky	15	15
(Indonesia) Denny Kantono (Indonesia) Antonius Budi Ariantho	11	12

Final
(Indonesia) Tony Gunawan (Indonesia) Halim Haryanto	11	15	11
(Indonesia) Denny Kantono (Indonesia) Antonius Budi Ariantho	15	5	15

== Women's doubles ==
Semifinals
(China) Ge Fei (China) Gu Jun	15	15
(China) Yang Wei (China) Huang Nanyan	5	4
(Denmark) Ann Jorgensen (Denmark) Majken Vange	5	8
(Denmark) Marlene Thomsen (Denmark) Rikke Olsen	15	15

Final
(China) Ge Fei (China) Gu Jun	w	/	o
(Denmark) Marlene Thomsen (Denmark) Rikke Olsen

== Mixed doubles ==
Semifinals
(Denmark) Michael Søgaard (Denmark) Rikke Olsen	9	15	11
(England) Simon Archer (England) Joanne Goode	15	13	15
(South Korea) Kim Dong-moon (South Korea) Ra Kyung-min	15	15
(Indonesia) Trikus Heryanto (Indonesia) Minarti Timur	7	4

Final
(England) Simon Archer (England) Joanne Goode	6	9
(South Korea) Kim Dong-moon (South Korea) Ra Kyung-min	15	15
