= 1994 All England Open Badminton Championships =

1994 All England Championships
Tournament details
- Dates: 16 March 1994– 20 March 1994
- Edition: 84th
- Location: Birmingham

The 1994 Yonex All England Open was the 84th edition of the All England Open Badminton Championships. It was held from 16 to 20 March 1994, in Birmingham, for the first time since it was established, previously it had been held always in London.

It was a five-star tournament and the prize money was US$125,000.

== Venue ==
- National Indoor Arena

== Final results ==
| Category | Winners | Runners-up | Score |
|---|---|---|---|
| Men's singles | (Indonesia) Hariyanto Arbi | (Indonesia) Ardy Wiranata | 15–12, 17–14 |
| Women's singles | (Indonesia) Susi Susanti | (China) Ye Zhaoying | 11–5, 11–9 |
| Men's doubles | (Indonesia) Rudy Gunawan & Bambang Suprianto | (Indonesia) Ricky Subagja & Rexy Mainaky | 15–12, 15–12 |
| Women's doubles | (South Korea) Chung So-young & Gil Young-ah | (South Korea) Jang Hye-ock & Shim Eun-jung | 7–15, 15–8, 15–4 |
| Mixed doubles | (England) Nick Ponting & Joanne Wright | (England) Chris Hunt & Gillian Clark | 15–10, 15–11 |

== Men's singles ==
=== Section 1 ===
Round of 32
(Indonesia) Hariyanto Arbi | 15 | 15
(Denmark) Jan Jørgensen | 8 | 6
(South Korea) Kim Hak-kyun | 15 | 15
(India) Deepankar Bhattacharya | 5 | 10
(Malaysia) Rashid Sidek | 15 | 15
(Denmark) Peter Espersen | 8 | 11
(England) Steve Butler | 15 | 6 | 17
(China) Liu Jun | 8 | 15 | 16
(Indonesia) Alan Budikusuma | 15 | 15
(China) Chen Gang | 1 | 12
(Thailand) Sompol Kukasemkij | 15 | 15
(Denmark) Peter Rasmussen | 10 | 2
(Denmark) Poul-Erik Høyer Larsen | 15 | 15
(Hong Kong) Wong Wai Lap | 10 | 11
(Malaysia) Foo Kok Keong | 15 | 15 | 15
(South Korea) Ahn Jae-chang | 18 | 12 | 10

Round of 16
(Indonesia) Arbi | 6 | 15 | 15
(South Korea) Hak-kyun | 15 | 13 | 7
(Malaysia) Sidek | 15 | 15
(England) Butler | 10 | 7
(Indonesia) Kusuma | 18 | 15
(Thailand) Kukasemkij | 15 | 3
(Denmark) Høyer Larsen | 17 | 15
(Malaysia) Keong | 15 | 5

Quarter-finals
(Indonesia) Arbi | 15 | 15
(Malaysia) Sidek | 1 | 5
(Indonesia) Kusuma | 15 | 15
(Denmark) Høyer Larsen | 10 | 3

Semi-finals
(Indonesia) Arbi | 15 | 15
(Indonesia) Kusuma | 5 | 7

=== Section 2 ===
Round of 32
(Indonesia) Ardy Wiranata | 15 | 15
(Denmark) Henrik Sørensen | 3 | 4
(Malaysia) Ong Ewe Hock | 15 | 15
(England) Peter Bush | 7 | 6
(Indonesia) Fung Permadi | 14 | 15 | 15
(Denmark) Soren B Nielsen | 17 | 9 | 3
(Indonesia) Tiong Ping Lioe | 15 | 15
(England) Steffan Pandya | 8 | 6
(Indonesia) Hermawan Susanto | 15 | 15
(Netherlands) Jeroen van Dijk | 1 | 7
(Denmark) Jens Maibom | 15 | 15
(Denmark) Morten Boesen | 11 | 6
(Denmark) Thomas Stuer-Lauridsen | 15 | 15
(Finland) Pontus Jäntti | 9 | 6
(South Korea) Park Sung-woo | 15 | 15
(Canada) Jaimie Dawson | 5 | 2

Round of 16
(Indonesia) Wiranata | 15 | 15
(South Korea) Ewe Hock | 12 | 12
(Indonesia) Permadi | 15 | 15
(Indonesia) Lioe | 7 | 9
(Indonesia) Susanto | 15 | 15
(Denmark) Meiborn | 6 | 14
(Denmark) Stuer-Lauridsen | 17 | 1 | 15
(South Korea) Sung-woo | 15 | 15 | 11

Quarter-finals
(Indonesia) Wiranata | 14 | 15 | 15
(Indonesia) Permadi | 18 | 4 | 4
(Indonesia) Susanto | 15 | 14 | 15
(Denmark) Stuer-Lauridsen | 12 | 18 | 7

Semi-finals
(Indonesia) Wiranata | 15 | 15
(Indonesia) Susanto | 8 | 3

== Women's singles ==
=== Section 1 ===
Round of 32
(Indonesia) Susi Susanti | 11 | 11
(Scotland) Anne Gibson | 3 | 2
(Japan) Hisako Mizui | 11 | 1 | 11
(Thailand) Somharuthai Jaroensiri | 8 | 11 | 4
(South Korea) Ra Kyung-min | 11 | 11
(Denmark) Mette Pedersen | 3 | 1
(Sweden) Lim Xiaoqing | 11 | 11
(Russia) Irina Yakusheva | 5 | 2
(South Korea) Bang Soo-hyun | 11 | 11
(Denmark) Anne Søndergaard | 5 | 0
(China) Zhang Ning | 11 | 10 | 11
(Indonesia) Minarti Timur | 5 | 12 | 6
(China) Han Jingna | 11 | 12
(Denmark) Michelle Rasmussen | 2 | 10
(England) Suzanne Louis-Lane | 12 | 5 | 11
(Japan) Takako Ida | 11 | 11 | 1

Round of 16
(Indonesia) Susanti | 11 | 1 | 11
(Japan) Mizui | 8 | 11 | 4
(South Korea) Kyung-min | 11 | 3 | 12
(Sweden) Xiaoqing | 6 | 11 | 10
(South Korea) Soo-Hyun | 11 | 11
(China) Zhang Ning | 2 | 5
(China) Jingna | 11 | 8 | 11
(England) Louis-Lane | 1 | 11 | 3

Quarter-finals
(Indonesia) Susanti | 11 | 11
(South Korea) Kyung-min | 5 | 2
(South Korea) Soo-Hyun | 11 | 11
(China) Jingna | 8 | 6

Semi-finals
(Indonesia) Susanti | 11 | 11
(South Korea) Soo-Hyun | 8 | 9

=== Section 2 ===
Round of 32
(China) Ye Zhaoying | 11 | 11
(Canada) Denyse Julien | 5 | 3
(Indonesia) Mia Audina Tjiptawan | 11 | 11
(Denmark) Lone Sørensen | 2 | 4
(Indonesia) Yuni Kartika | 11 | 11
(Japan) Shinobu Sasaki | 1 | 5
(Sweden) Christine Magnusson | 11 | 11
(South Korea) Kim Ji-hyun | 3 | 1
(Denmark) Camilla Martin | 11 | 11
(New Zealand) Rhonda Robertson | 2 | 3
(Indonesia) Zarinah Abdullah | 12 | 11
(Netherlands) Monique Hoogland | 10 | 6
(Malaysia) Liu Yuhong | 11 | 11
(England) Joanne Muggeridge | 1 | 3
(Indonesia) Yuliani Sentosa | w/o
(Sweden) Catrine Bengtsson | scr

Round of 16
(China) Zhaoying | 6 | 11 | 11
(Indonesia) Audina | 11 | 8 | 7
(Indonesia) Kartika | 11 | 7 | 11
(Sweden) Gandrup | 4 | 11 | 6
(Denmark) Martin | 11 | 11
(Indonesia) Abdullah | 4 | 1
(Malaysia) Yuhong | w/o
(Indonesia) Sentosa | scr

Quarter-finals
(China) Zhaoying | 12 | 11
(Indonesia) Kartika | 11 | 7
(Denmark) Martin | 11 | 11
(Malaysia) Yuhong | 4 | 6

Semi-finals
(China) Zhaoying | 11 | 11
(Denmark) Martin | 6 | 8
