= Badminton at the 1994 Asian Games – Men's singles =

Men's singles at the 1994 Asian Games
- Venue: Tsuru Memorial Gymnasium
- Dates: 11–15 October
- Competitors: 20 from 11 nations

Medalists
gold medal	Hariyanto Arbi	Indonesia
silver medal	Joko Suprianto	Indonesia
bronze medal	Kim Hak-kyun	South Korea
bronze medal	Dong Jiong	China

The badminton men's singles tournament at the 1994 Asian Games in Hiroshima took place from 11 October to 15 October at Tsuru Memorial Gymnasium.

== Schedule ==
All times are Japan Standard Time (UTC+09:00)

Date	Time	Event
Tuesday, 11 October 1994	13:00	1st round
Wednesday, 12 October 1994	13:00	2nd round
Thursday, 13 October 1994	13:00	Quarterfinals
Friday, 14 October 1994	13:00	Semifinals
Saturday, 15 October 1994	13:00	Final

== Results ==
=== Final ===
Final
1	Joko Suprianto (INA)	7	1
2	Hariyanto Arbi (INA)	15	15

=== Top half ===
1st round
Lee Mou-chou (TPE)	17	12	4
Lin Liwen (CHN)	16	15	15
Fumihiko Machida (JPN)	15	15
Chhea Chhorvann (CAM)	1	1

2nd round
1	Joko Suprianto (INA)	15	15
Abdulla Shakeeb (MDV)	3	3
Sompol Kukasemkij (THA)	10	8
Lin Liwen (CHN)	15	15
3/4	Kim Hak-kyun (KOR)	15	18
Muralidesan Krishnamurthy (MAS)	4	15
Tan Sian Peng (SIN)	11	2
Fumihiko Machida (JPN)	15	15

Quarterfinals
1	Joko Suprianto (INA)	15	10	15
Lin Liwen (CHN)	2	15	2
3/4	Kim Hak-kyun (KOR)	15	15
Fumihiko Machida (JPN)	2	1

Semifinals
1	Joko Suprianto (INA)	15	15
3/4	Kim Hak-kyun (KOR)	6	5

=== Bottom half ===
1st round
Takahiro Suka (JPN)	15	15
Mohamed Sharath (MDV)	2	1
Wong Wai Lap (HKG)	12	15	11
Teeranun Chiangta (THA)	15	7	15

2nd round
Takahiro Suka (JPN)	4	4
Ong Ewe Hock (MAS)	15	15
Chang Jeng-shyuang (TPE)	7	10
3/4	Dong Jiong (CHN)	15	15
Teeranun Chiangta (THA)	11	15
Park Sung-woo (KOR)	15	18
Hor Bun Leng (CAM)	6	5
2	Hariyanto Arbi (INA)	15	15

Quarterfinals
Ong Ewe Hock (MAS)	11	9
3/4	Dong Jiong (CHN)	15	15
Park Sung-woo (KOR)	9	4
2	Hariyanto Arbi (INA)	15	15

Semifinals
3/4	Dong Jiong (CHN)	7	7
2	Hariyanto Arbi (INA)	15	15
