= Badminton at the 1998 Asian Games – Men's singles =

Men's singles at the 1998 Asian Games
- Venue: Thammasat Gymnasium 2
- Dates: 13–17 December 1998
- Competitors: 26 from 14 nations

Medalists
gold medal	Dong Jiong	China
silver medal	Hendrawan	Indonesia
bronze medal	Sun Jun	China
bronze medal	Yong Hock Kin	Malaysia

The badminton men's singles tournament at the 1998 Asian Games in Bangkok took place from 13 December to 17 December at Thammasat Gymnasium 2.

== Schedule ==
All times are Indochina Time (UTC+07:00)

Date	Time	Event
Sunday, 13 December 1998	13:00	1st round
Monday, 14 December 1998	13:00	2nd round
Tuesday, 15 December 1998	13:00	Quarterfinals
Wednesday, 16 December 1998	13:00	Semifinals
Thursday, 17 December 1998	13:00	Final

== Results ==
=== Final ===
Final
3	Hendrawan (INA)	14	15	8
4	Dong Jiong (CHN)	17	10	15

=== Top half ===
1st round
Sadegh Karbasi (IRI)	7	4
Kazuhiro Shimogami (JPN)	15	15
Ashraf Masih (PAK)	4	0
Ahn Jae-chang (KOR)	15	15
Chhea Chhorvann (CAM)	9	10
Ian Gil Piencenaves (PHI)	15	15
Roslin Hashim (MAS)	15	15
Ng Wei (HKG)	9	7
Thushara Edirisinghe (SRI)	1	15	8
Boonsak Ponsana (THA)	15	11	15

2nd round
1	Sun Jun (CHN)	15	15
Kazuhiro Shimogami (JPN)	13	6
Chen Feng (TPE)	13	15	9
Ahn Jae-chang (KOR)	15	6	15
3	Hendrawan (INA)	15	15
Ian Gil Piencenaves (PHI)	9	7
Roslin Hashim (MAS)	15	11	17
Boonsak Ponsana (THA)	8	15	16

Quarterfinals
1	Sun Jun (CHN)	15	17
Ahn Jae-chang (KOR)	9	14
3	Hendrawan (INA)	15	15
Roslin Hashim (MAS)	11	6

Semifinals
1	Sun Jun (CHN)	15	12	9
3	Hendrawan (INA)	6	15	15

=== Bottom half ===
1st round
Anuphap Theeraratsakul (THA)	15	15
Wajid Ali (PAK)	5	0
Afshin Bozorgzadeh (IRI)	5	1
Taufik Hidayat (INA)	15	15
Kennevic Asuncion (PHI)	12	11
Lee Mou-chou (TPE)	15	15
Park Sung-woo (KOR)	15	15
Krang Sokhang (CAM)	2	2
Tam Kai Chuen (HKG)	15	15
Shinji Ota (JPN)	11	3

2nd round
Anuphap Theeraratsakul (THA)	3	2
Taufik Hidayat (INA)	15	15
Lee Mou-chou (TPE)	17	2	4
4	Dong Jiong (CHN)	15	15	15
Park Sung-woo (KOR)	15	2
Pullela Gopichand (IND)	17	15
Tam Kai Chuen (HKG)	14	5
2	Yong Hock Kin (MAS)	17	15

Quarterfinals
Taufik Hidayat (INA)	5	13
4	Dong Jiong (CHN)	15	15
Pullela Gopichand (IND)	7	4
2	Yong Hock Kin (MAS)	15	15

Semifinals
4	Dong Jiong (CHN)	15	15
2	Yong Hock Kin (MAS)	5	10
