= 1995 Sudirman Cup =

Tournament details
- Dates: 17 May – 20 May
- Edition: 4th
- Venue: Malley Sports Centre
- Location: Lausanne, Switzerland

The 1995 Sudirman Cup was the fourth tournament of the World Mixed Team Badminton Championships. It was held from May 17 to May 20, 1995 in Lausanne, Switzerland.

== Results ==
49 teams participated in this edition of Sudirman Cup. Nigeria entered but ultimately did not participate.

=== Group 1 ===
==== Subgroup A ====
Team One	Team Two	Score
China	England	4–1
South Korea	England	4–1
China	South Korea	3–2

China
4
Lausanne, Switzerland

England
1

			1	2	3
1	(China) (England)	Liu Jianjun / Wang Xiaoyuan; Nick Ponting / Joanne Wright	6; 15	8; 15
2	(China) (England)	Sun Jun; Darren Hall	15; 9	15; 10
3	(China) (England)	Ye Zhaoying; Julia Mann	11; 5	11; 6
4	(China) (England)	Huang Zhanzhong / Jiang Xin; Simon Archer / Chris Hunt	15; 12	17; 14
5	(China) (England)	Ge Fei / Gu Jun; Julie Bradbury / Joanne Wright	15; 6	15; 4

China
3
Lausanne, Switzerland

South Korea
2

			1	2	3
1	(China) (South Korea)	Chen Xingdong / Wang Xiaoyuan; Kim Dong-moon / Gil Young-ah	6; 15	12; 15
2	(China) (South Korea)	Ye Zhaoying; Bang Soo-hyun	2; 11	11; 6	11; 6
3	(China) (South Korea)	Dong Jiong; Park Sung-woo	2; 15	18; 16	15; 17
4	(China) (South Korea)	Huang Zhanzhong / Jiang Xin; Kang Kyung-jin / Kim Dong-moon	15; 9	15; 10
5	(China) (South Korea)	Ge Fei / Gu Jun; Gil Young-ah / Jang Hye-ock	15; 1	14; 18	15; 5

==== Subgroup B ====
Team One	Team Two	Score
Indonesia	Thailand	5–0
Denmark	Thailand	4–1
Indonesia	Denmark	3–2

Indonesia
5
Lausanne, Switzerland
18 May 1995

Thailand
0

			1	2	3
1	(Indonesia) (Thailand)	Tri Kusharjanto / Minarti Timur n/a / n/a	15; 4	15; 5
2	(Indonesia) (Thailand)	Mia Audina n/a	11; 6	11; 8
3	(Indonesia) (Thailand)	Hariyanto Arbi; Vacharapan Kumthong	15; 2	15; 7
4	(Indonesia) (Thailand)	Rudy Gunawan / Bambang Suprianto; Siripong Siripool / Khunakorn Sudhisodhi	15; 2	8; 15	15; 8
5	(Indonesia) (Thailand)	Eliza Nathanael / Zelin Resiana; Plernta Boonyarit / Somharuthai Jaroensiri	15; 2	15; 7

Denmark
4
Lausanne, Switzerland

Thailand
1

			1	2	3
1	(Denmark) (Thailand)	Jon Holst-Christensen / Rikke Olsen; Siripong Siripool / Plernta Boonyarit	15; 3	15; 4
2	(Denmark) (Thailand)	Camilla Martin; Somharuthai Jaroensiri	5; 11	11; 9	11; 7
3	(Denmark) (Thailand)	Thomas Stuer-Lauridsen; Vacharapan Kumthong	15; 5	15; 6
4	(Denmark) (Thailand)	Michael Søgaard / Henrik Svarrer; Pramote Teerawiwatana / Sakrapee Thongsari	15; 2	10; 15	11; 15
5	(Denmark) (Thailand)	Lotte Olsen / Lisbet Stuer-Lauridsen; Plernta Boonyarit / Pornsawan Plungwech	15; 0	15; 4

Indonesia
3
Lausanne, Switzerland

Denmark
2

			1	2	3
1	(Indonesia) (Denmark)	Susi Susanti; Lotte Thomsen	11; 1	11; 5
2	(Indonesia) (Denmark)	Ardy Wiranata; Peter Rasmussen	15; 8	9; 15	5; 15
3	(Indonesia) (Denmark)	Rexy Mainaky / Ricky Subagja; Jon Holst-Christensen / Michael Søgaard	15; 10	15; 7
4	(Indonesia) (Denmark)	Finarsih / Lili Tampi; Helene Kirkegaard / Rikke Olsen	10; 15	15; 11	11; 15
5	(Indonesia) (Denmark)	Aryono Miranat / Eliza Nathanael; Thomas Stuer-Lauridsen / Marlene Thomsen	15; 6	15; 12

==== Relegation playoff ====
Team One	Team Two	Score
England	Thailand	3-2

==== Semifinals ====
Team One	Team Two	Score
Indonesia	South Korea	4–1
China	Denmark	4–1

Indonesia
4
Lausanne, Switzerland
20 May 1995

South Korea
1

			1	2	3
1	(Indonesia) (South Korea)	Tri Kusharjanto / Minarti Timur; Kim Dong-moon / Gil Young-ah	10; 15	15; 8	15; 8
2	(Indonesia) (South Korea)	Hariyanto Arbi; Kim Hak-kyun	15; 12	9; 15	15; 5
3	(Indonesia) (South Korea)	Susi Susanti; Bang Soo-hyun	11; 3	5; 11	5; 11
4	(Indonesia) (South Korea)	Eliza Nathanael / Zelin Resiana; Jang Hye-ock / Kim Mee-hyang	15; 12	18; 17
5	(Indonesia) (South Korea)	Rexy Mainaky / Ricky Subagja; Ha Tae-kwon / Kim Dong-moon

China
4
Lausanne, Switzerland

Denmark
1

			1	2	3
1	(China) (Denmark)	n/a / n/a Jon Holst-Christensen / Rikke Olsen
2	(China) (Denmark)	Ye Zhaoying; Camilla Martin	9; 11	12; 10	11; 6
3	(China) (Denmark)	Sun Jun; Thomas Stuer-Lauridsen
4	(China) (Denmark)	n/a / n/a n/a / n/a
5	(China) (Denmark)	n/a / n/a n/a / n/a

==== Final ====
China
3
Lausanne, Switzerland

Indonesia
1

			1	2	3
1	(China) (Indonesia)	Ge Fei / Gu Jun; Zelin Resiana / Eliza Nathanael	15; 9	15; 10
2	(China) (Indonesia)	Ye Zhaoying; Susi Susanti	11; 2	11; 3
3	(China) (Indonesia)	Sun Jun; Hariyanto Arbi	15; 7	9; 15	15; 11
4	(China) (Indonesia)	Jiang Xin / Huang Zhanzhong; Rexy Mainaky / Ricky Subagja	15; 11	11; 15	6; 15

1995 Sudirman Cup Champions

China
First title

=== Group 2 ===
Team One	Team Two	Score
Sweden	Netherlands	5-0
Sweden	Russia	3-2
Sweden	Japan	4-1
Netherlands	Russia	3-2
Netherlands	Japan	4-1
Russia	Japan	4-1

=== Group 3 ===
Team One	Team Two	Score
Chinese Taipei	Canada	3-2
Chinese Taipei	Germany	3-2
Chinese Taipei	Scotland	3-2
Canada	Germany	3-2
Canada	Scotland	4-1
Germany	Scotland	4-1

=== Group 4 ===
Team One	Team Two	Score
Australia	New Zealand	3-2
Australia	Hong Kong	4-1
Australia	Austria	4-1
New Zealand	Hong Kong	3-2
New Zealand	Austria	5-0
Hong Kong	Austria	4-1

=== Group 5 ===
Team One	Team Two	Score
Norway	India	3-2
Norway	Finland	3-2
Norway	Czech Republic	4-1
India	Finland	4-1
India	Czech Republic	4-1
Finland	Czech Republic	3-2

=== Group 6 ===
Team One	Team Two	Score
Poland	Switzerland	3-2
Poland	United States	4-1
Poland	Iceland	5-0
Switzerland	United States	2-3
Switzerland	Iceland	4-1
United States	Iceland	2-3

=== Group 7 ===
Team One	Team Two	Score
Ukraine	(Republic of Ireland) Ireland	4-1
Ukraine	Bulgaria	4-1
Ukraine	Wales	3-2
(Republic of Ireland) Ireland	Bulgaria	1-4
(Republic of Ireland) Ireland	Wales	1-4
Bulgaria	Wales	2-3

=== Group 8 ===
Team One	Team Two	Score
France	Kazakhstan	4-1
France	Belgium	3-2
France	Hungary	4-1
Kazakhstan	Belgium	3-2
Kazakhstan	Hungary	4-1
Belgium	Hungary	3-2

=== Group 9 ===
Team One	Team Two	Score
Belarus	Spain	5-0
Belarus	Peru	5-0
Belarus	Portugal	4-1
Belarus	Pakistan	5-0
Spain	Peru	4-1
Spain	Portugal	3-2
Spain	Pakistan	4-1
Peru	Portugal	3-2
Peru	Pakistan	3-2
Portugal	Pakistan	5-0

=== Group 10 ===
Team One	Team Two	Score
Mauritius	Israel	5-0
Mauritius	Slovenia	5-0
Mauritius	Cyprus	4-1
Mauritius	Italy	3-2
Israel	Slovenia	3-2
Israel	Cyprus	5-0
Israel	Italy	5-0
Slovenia	Cyprus	5-0
Slovenia	Italy	4-1
Cyprus	Italy	3-2

=== Group 11 ===
Team One	Team Two	Score
Slovakia	Malta	4-1
Slovakia	Brazil	5-0
Slovakia	Argentina	4-1
Slovakia	Morocco	3-2
Malta	Brazil	3-2
Malta	Argentina	4-1
Malta	Morocco	5-0
Brazil	Argentina	4-1
Brazil	Morocco	5-0
Argentina	Morocco	5-0

== Final classification ==
Group 1
Pos	Country
1	China
2	Indonesia
3	South Korea
3	Denmark
5	England
6	Thailand

Group 2
Pos	Country
7	Sweden
8	Netherlands
9	Russia
10	Japan

Group 3
Pos	Country
11	Chinese Taipei
12	Canada
13	Germany
14	Scotland

Group 4
Pos	Country
15	Australia
16	New Zealand
17	Hong Kong
18	Austria

Group 5
Pos	Country
19	Norway
20	India
21	Finland
22	Czech Republic

Group 6
Pos	Country
23	Poland
24	Switzerland
25	United States
26	Iceland

Group 7
Pos	Country
27	Ukraine
28	Wales
29	Bulgaria
30	Ireland

Group 8
Pos	Country
31	France
32	Kazakhstan
33	Belgium
34	Hungary

Group 9
Pos	Country
35	Belarus
36	Spain
37	Peru
38	Portugal
39	Pakistan

Group 10
Pos	Country
40	Mauritius
41	Israel
42	Slovenia
43	Cyprus
44	Italy

Group 11
Pos	Country
45	Slovakia
46	Malta
47	Brazil
48	Argentina
49	Morocco

Promoted to higher group
Relegated to lower group
