= Bimantara World Badminton Junior Invitation Championships =

The Bimantara World Junior Championships was an international invitation badminton tournament for junior players. It was held in Jakarta, Indonesia from 1987 to 1991. Sponsor of the annually held event was the Indonesian Bimantara Group.

After the fifth edition of the Bimantara World Junior Championships, the event was replaced by the official World Junior Championships for badminton players under 19 years old by the International Badminton Federation.

== Champions ==
Year	Boys' singles	Girls' singles	Boys' doubles	Girls' doubles	Mixed doubles
1987	(Indonesia) Ardy Wiranata	(Indonesia) Susi Susanti	(China) Wu Wenkai (China) Jin Feng	(Indonesia) Susi Susanti (Indonesia) Lilik Sudarwati	(Indonesia) Ardy Wiranata (Indonesia) Susi Susanti
1988	(Denmark) Thomas Stuer-Lauridsen	(Indonesia) Susi Susanti	(Indonesia) Aras Razak (Indonesia) Ricky Subagja	(Indonesia) Susi Susanti (Indonesia) Lilik Sudarwati	(Indonesia) Ricky Subagja (Indonesia) Lilik Sudarwati
1989	(Indonesia) Heryanto Arbi	(South Korea) Kim Ji-hyun	(South Korea) Choi Ji-tae (South Korea) Lee Heung-soon	(Indonesia) Eliza Nathanael (Indonesia) Finarsih	(England) John Quinn (England) Joanne Wright
1990	(Indonesia) Henry G. Wijadi	(Indonesia) Yuni Kartika	(Indonesia) Seng Kok Kiong (Indonesia) Hadi Sugianto	(China) Ye Zhaoying (China) Liu Hong	(China) Hu Zhilang (China) Peng Xingyong
1991	(Indonesia) Indra Wijaya	(China) Yao Yan	(Indonesia) Dadan Hidayat (Indonesia) Kurnia	(China) Gu Jun (China) Han Jingna	(Denmark) Thomas Damgaard (Denmark) Rikke Olsen
