= Sun Jun (badminton) =

Chinese badminton player

Sun Jun 孙俊
Personal information
- Born: 16 June 1975 (age 51) Nanjing, Jiangsu, China
- Height: 1.74 m (5 ft 9 in)
- Weight: 73 kg (161 lb)
- Spouse: Ge Fei (m. 2002)

Sport
- Country: China
- Sport: Badminton
- Handedness: Right

Men's singles
- Highest ranking: 1
- BWF profile
Medal record
Men's badminton
Representing China
World Championships
Gold medal – first place	1999 Copenhagen	Men's singles
Silver medal – second place	1997 Glasgow	Men's singles
World Cup
Gold medal – first place	1997 Yogyakarta	Men's singles
Sudirman Cup
Gold medal – first place	1995 Lausanne	Mixed team
Gold medal – first place	1997 Glasgow	Mixed team
Gold medal – first place	1999 Copenhagen	Mixed team
Thomas Cup
Bronze medal – third place	1996 Hong Kong	Men's team
Bronze medal – third place	1998 Hong Kong	Men's team
Asian Games
Silver medal – second place	1998 Bangkok	Men's team
Bronze medal – third place	1998 Bangkok	Men's singles
Asian Championships
Gold medal – first place	1997 Kuala Lumpur	Men's singles
Silver medal – second place	1995 Beijing	Men's singles
Silver medal – second place	1998 Bangkok	Mixed doubles
Asian Cup
Silver medal – second place	1995 Qingdao	Men's singles
World Junior Championships
Gold medal – first place	1992 Jakarta	Boys' singles

Sun Jun (simplified Chinese: 孙俊; traditional Chinese: 孫俊; pinyin: Sūn Jùn; born 16 June 1975) is a former world number 1 singles badminton player from China in the late 1990s whose resume includes the World Championship, World Cup, Asian Championship and All England men's singles titles. He was known for his all-round defensive ability as well as his never-say-die attitude on court as exemplified by his famous match with Peter Rasmussen whereby he suffered a severe leg cramp during mid-match but basically carried on to finish an entire set limping on one leg, at one point leading by 10-3 due to intelligent play before succumbing to his opponent.

He is married to the great doubles badminton player Ge Fei.

== Career ==
=== World Championships ===
Sun won the 1999 IBF World Championships, beating Fung Permadi in the final. He also won a silver medal at the 1997 IBF World Championships, when in the final he was leading 10-3 in the deciding set against Peter Rasmussen despite suffering from a leg cramp, eventually losing 16-17, 18-13, 15-10.

=== Summer Olympics ===
Sun Jun competed in badminton at the 1996 Summer Olympics in men's singles. In the first round he had a bye, and in the second one he defeated Kim Hak-kyun from Korea. In round of 16 he was beaten by Alan Budikusuma 15-5, 15-6.

Sun Jun competed in badminton at the 2000 Summer Olympics in men's singles. In the first round he had a bye, and in the second round he defeated the defending Olympic champion Poul-Erik Høyer Larsen from Denmark. In the round of 16 Sun beat Richard Vaughan from Great Britain and in quarterfinals he lost to Hendrawan from Indonesia.

== Achievements ==
=== World Championships ===
Men's singles
Year	Venue	Opponent	Score	Result
1997	Scotstoun Centre, Glasgow, Scotland	(Denmark) Peter Rasmussen	17–16, 13–18, 10–15	Silver
1999	Brøndby Arena, Copenhagen, Denmark	(Chinese Taipei) Fung Permadi	15–6, 15–13	Gold

=== World Cup ===
Men's singles
Year	Venue	Opponent	Score	Result
1997	Among Rogo Sports Hall, Yogyakarta, Indonesia	(Indonesia) Joko Suprianto	15–9, 15–8	Gold

=== Asian Games ===
Men's singles
Year	Venue	Opponent	Score	Result
1998	Thammasat Gymnasium 2, Bangkok, Thailand	(Indonesia) Hendrawan	15–6, 12–15, 9–15	Bronze

=== Asian Championships ===
Men's singles
Year	Venue	Opponent	Score	Result
1995	Olympic Sports Center Gymnasium, Beijing, China	(South Korea) Park Sung-woo	8–15, 8–15	Silver
1997	Stadium Negara, Kuala Lumpur, Malaysia	(Indonesia) Hendrawan	18–14, 8–15, 15–9	Gold

Mixed doubles
Year	Venue	Partner	Opponent	Score	Result
1998	Nimibutr Stadium, Bangkok, Thailand	(China) Ge Fei	(South Korea) Kim Dong-moon (South Korea) Ra Kyung-min	7–15, 8–15	Silver

=== Asian Cup ===
Men's singles
Year	Venue	Opponent	Score	Result
1995	Xinxing Gymnasium, Qingdao, China	(Indonesia) Joko Suprianto	7–15, 8–15	Silver

=== World Junior Championships ===
Boys' singles
Year	Venue	Opponent	Score	Result
1992	Istora Senayan, Jakarta, Indonesia	(Indonesia) George Rimarcdi	15–9, 15–11	Gold

=== IBF World Grand Prix ===
The World Badminton Grand Prix sanctioned by International Badminton Federation (IBF) from 1983 to 2006.

Men's singles
Year	Tournament	Opponent	Score	Result
1994	French Open	(Finland) Robert Liljequist	15–1, 16–17, 15–2	(gold) Winner
1994	Brunei Open	(China) Lin Liwen	15–8, 15–12	(gold) Winner
1994	Thailand Open	(Indonesia) Joko Suprianto	15–10, 11–15, 5–15	(silver) Runner-up
1996	Dutch Open	(Denmark) Poul-Erik Høyer Larsen	5–9, 9–3, 9–3, 9–5	(gold) Winner
1996	Russian Open	(China) Hu Zhilan	15–8, 15–10	(gold) Winner
1996	World Grand Prix Finals	(Chinese Taipei) Fung Permadi	12–15, 8–15	(silver) Runner-up
1997	All England Open	(China) Dong Jiong	9–15, 5–15	(silver) Runner-up
1997	World Grand Prix Finals	(China) Dong Jiong	15–9, 15–6	(gold) Winner
1998	All England Open	(Malaysia) Ong Ewe Hock	15–1, 15–7	(gold) Winner
1998	Swiss Open	(Denmark) Peter Gade	12–15, 15–8, 11–15	(silver) Runner-up
1998	World Grand Prix Finals	(Denmark) Peter Gade	15–11, 15–8	(gold) Winner
1999	Japan Open	(Denmark) Peter Gade	3–15, 10–15	(silver) Runner-up

=== IBF International ===
Men's singles
Year	Tournament	Opponent	Score	Result
1992	Ten Days of Dawn	(China) Zeng Yu		(gold) Winner
1993	Wimbledon International	(England) Peter Knowles	15–13, 16–17, 15–8	(gold) Winner

Men's doubles
Year	Tournament	Partner	Opponent	Score	Result
1992	Ten Days of Dawn	(China) Zeng Yu	(China) Yu Yong (China) Zhao Zhiyong		(gold) Winner

Mixed doubles
Year	Tournament	Partner	Opponent	Score	Result
2001	Singapore International	(China) Ge Fei	(China) Shen Long (China) Gao Qian	15–7, 15–11	(gold) Winner

== Performance timeline ==
Key

W	Won	F	Finalist	SF	Semi-finalist
QF	Quarter-finalist	#R	Rounds 4, 3, 2, 1	RR	Round-robin stage
Q#	Qualification round	A	Absent	w/d	Withdrew
G	Gold	S	Silver	B	Bronze
NH	Not held	N/A	Not applicable	DNQ	Did not qualify

=== National team ===
- Senior level

Team events	1995	1996	1997	1998	1999
Thomas Cup	NH	B	NH	B	NH
Sudirman Cup	G	NH	G	NH	G
Asian Games	NH			S	NH

=== Individual competitions ===
==== Junior level ====
- Boys' singles

Events	1992
World Junior Championships	G

==== Senior level ====
- Men's singles

Tournaments	1995	1996	1997	1998	1999	2000
Olympic Games	NH	3R	NH			QF
World Championships	3R	NH	S	NH	G	NH
World Cup		A	G	NH		
Asian Games	NH			B	NH	
Asian Championships	S	A	G	S	A	
Asian Cup	S	A	NH			

Tournaments	1991	1992	1993	1994	1995	1996	1997	1998	1999	2000
Year-end finals						F	W	W	RR	A
China Open	1R	2R	2R	SF	QF	SF	SF	NH	wd	NH
Japan Open	A				wd	2R	1R	3R	F	3R
Swiss Open	A				QF	A	SF	F	A	1R
All England Open	A			1R	A		F	W	A	
Malaysia Open	A			QF	A				QF	2R
Singapore Open	A		NH	QF	A	NH	SF	SF	A	NH
Thailand Open	A			F	A			NH	QF	3R
Chinese Taipei Open	A					SF	A	NH	SF	A
Denmark Open	A			QF	A				SF	A
Dutch Open	A			3R	NH	W	A			
Korea Open	A				2R	A	QF	NH	A	
French Open	A			W	A					
German Open	A			SF	A			NH	A	
Hong Kong Open	A			QF	A					NH
Indonesia Open	A									1R
Polish Open	A					SF	A			
Russian Open	NH	A				W	A	NH		A
US Open	A				2R	A				
Brunei Open	NH	A		W	A		NH	A	NH	
Iran Fajr International	A	W	A	NH		A	NH	A		NH
Wimbledon Open	A		W	A		NH				

- Men's doubles

Tournaments	1992	1993	1994	1995	1996	1997	1998	1999	2000	2001
All England Open	A		2R	A						
China Open	A		2R	A			NH	A	NH	A
Denmark Open	A		1R	A						
Dutch Open	A		2R	NH	A					
French Open	A		QF	A						
German Open	A		2R	A			NH	A		
Iran Fajr International	W	A	NH		A	NH	A		NH	A
Singapore International	NH							A	NH	QF

- Mixed doubles

Events	1998
Asian Championships	S

Tournaments	1993	1994	1995	1996	1997	1998	1999	2000	2001
All England Open	1R	A							
Singapore International	NH						A	NH	W
Wimbledon Open	QF	A		NH					
