= Ardy Wiranata =

Indonesian badminton player (born 1970)

Personal information
- Born: Ardy Bernardus Wiranata; 10 February 1970 (age 56) Jakarta, Indonesia
- Height: 1.71 m (5 ft 7 in)
- Weight: 67 kg (148 lb)
- Spouse: Elizabeth Tamzil

Sport
- Sport: Badminton
- Handedness: Right
- Coached by: Tang Xianhu

Men's singles
- Highest ranking: 1
Medal record
Men's badminton
Representing Indonesia
Olympic Games
Silver medal – second place	1992 Barcelona	Men's singles
World Championships
Silver medal – second place	1989 Jakarta	Men's singles
Bronze medal – third place	1991 Copenhagen	Men's singles
Bronze medal – third place	1993 Birmingham	Men's singles
World Cup
Gold medal – first place	1991 Macau	Men's singles
Bronze medal – third place	1990 Jakarta	Men's singles
Bronze medal – third place	1994 Ho Chi Minh	Men's singles
Bronze medal – third place	1995 Jakarta	Men's singles
Sudirman Cup
Silver medal – second place	1991 Copenhagen	Mixed team
Silver medal – second place	1993 Birmingham	Mixed team
Silver medal – second place	1995 Lausanne	Mixed team
Bronze medal – third place	1997 Glasgow	Mixed team
Thomas Cup
Gold medal – first place	1994 Jakarta	Men's team
Gold medal – first place	1996 Hong Kong	Men's team
Silver medal – second place	1992 Kuala Lumpur	Men's team
Bronze medal – third place	1988 Kuala Lumpur	Men's team
Bronze medal – third place	1990 Tokyo	Men's team
Asian Games
Gold medal – first place	1994 Hiroshima	Men's team
Bronze medal – third place	1990 Beijing	Men's team
Asian Championships
Gold medal – first place	1993 Hong Kong	Men's team
Bronze medal – third place	1997 Kuala Lumpur	Men's singles
SEA Games
Gold medal – first place	1991 Manila	Men's singles
Gold medal – first place	1995 Chiang Mai	Men's team
Silver medal – second place	1991 Manila	Men's team
Silver medal – second place	1995 Chiang Mai	Men's singles

Ardy Bernardus Wiranata (born 10 February 1970) is an Indonesian-born Canadian former badminton player who rated among the top singles players in the world (several of whom were fellow Indonesians) during most of the 1990s.

== Career ==
Quick, supple, and powerful, he won numerous international events and arguably had the best overall record of any player in the first half of the decade. Born in Jakarta, Wiranata trained at the PB Djarum. His achievements began when won the invitation World Junior Championships in 1987 in the boys' singles and mixed doubles event partnered with Susi Susanti. Afterwards, he managed to competing in the senior tournament, by become the runner-up at the 1989 IBF World Championships.

Wiranata earned the silver medal in singles at the 1992 Summer Olympics, losing the final to fellow countryman Alan Budikusuma. He also won the silver medal at the 1989 IBF World Championships, and bronze medals at this competition in 1991 and 1993. His first-place finishes included the prestigious All-England men's singles in 1991, three Japan Opens, and six Indonesian Open singles championships between 1990 and 1997, where he dominated his teammates. Wiranata also won the Malaysia (1993), Singapore (1994), Korea (1994), Swedish (1997), and U.S. (2000) Opens, as well as the Badminton World Cup (1991) and the World Badminton Grand Prix Final (1994). He clinched the decisive third point for Indonesia against Malaysia in the final of the 1994 Thomas Cup (men's world team championship) in Jakarta. He retired from badminton in 2000.

== Personal life ==
Wiranata is married and has a son. He is now a badminton coach in Calgary, Canada. Wiranata became a Canadian citizen in 2014.

== Achievements ==
=== Olympic Games ===
Men's singles
Year	Venue	Opponent	Score	Result	Ref.
1992	Pavelló de la Mar Bella, Barcelona, Spain	(Indonesia) Alan Budikusuma	12–15, 13–18	Silver	

=== World Championships ===
Men's singles
Year	Venue	Opponent	Score	Result	Ref.
1989	Senayan Sports Complex, Jakarta, Indonesia	(China) Yang Yang	10–15, 15–2, 5–15	Silver	
1991	Brøndby Arena, Copenhagen, Denmark	(China) Zhao Jianhua	2–15, 15–10, 6–15	Bronze	
1993	National Indoor Arena, Birmingham, England	(Indonesia) Joko Suprianto	14–18, 3–15	Bronze	

=== World Cup ===
Men's singles
Year	Venue	Opponent	Score	Result	Ref.
1990	Istora Senayan, Jakarta, Indonesia	(China) Zhao Jianhua	10–15, 15–14, 16–18	Bronze	
1991	Macau Forum, Macau	(China) Zhao Jianhua	12–15, 15–7, 15–10	Gold	
1994	Phan Đình Phùng Indoor Stadium, Ho Chi Minh City, Vietnam	(Indonesia) Hariyanto Arbi	10–15, 11–15	Bronze	
1995	Istora Senayan, Jakarta, Indonesia	(Indonesia) Alan Budikusuma	10–15, 3–15	Bronze	

=== Asian Championships ===
Men's singles
Year	Venue	Opponent	Score	Result	Ref.
1997	Kuala Lumpur, Malaysia	(Indonesia) Hendrawan	15–18, 10–15	Bronze	

=== SEA Games ===
Men's singles
Year	Venue	Opponent	Score	Result	Ref.
1991	Camp Crame Gymnasium, Manila, Philippines	(Indonesia) Joko Suprianto	15–4, 15–6	Gold	
1995	Gymnasium 3, 700th Anniversary Sport Complex, Chiang Mai, Thailand	(Indonesia) Joko Suprianto	10–15, 9–15	Silver	

=== World Junior Championships ===
The Bimantara World Junior Championships was an international invitation badminton tournament for junior players. It was held in Jakarta, Indonesia from 1987 to 1991.

Boys' singles
Year	Venue	Opponent	Score	Result	Ref.
1987	Jakarta, Indonesia	(China) Jin Feng	15–10, 15–6	Gold	

Mixed doubles
Year	Venue	Partner	Opponent	Score	Result	Ref.
1987	Jakarta, Indonesia	(Indonesia) Susi Susanti	(Indonesia) Ricky Subagja (Indonesia) Lilik Sudarwati	7–15, 15–7, 15–9	Gold	

=== IBF World Grand Prix (20 titles, 13 runners-up) ===
The World Badminton Grand Prix sanctioned by International Badminton Federation (IBF) from 1983 to 2006.

Men's singles
Year	Tournament	Opponent	Score	Result	Ref.
1988	China Open	(China) Zhao Jianhua	10–15, 8–15	(silver) Runner-up	
1988	English Masters	(Denmark) Morten Frost	8–15, 3–15	(silver) Runner-up	
1989	China Open	(China) Xiong Guobao	17–15, 15–12	(gold) Winner	
1990	Chinese Taipei Open	(Indonesia) Eddy Kurniawan	17–18, 15–7, 11–15	(silver) Runner-up	
1990	Australian Open	(Malaysia) Foo Kok Keong	15–12, 15–9	(gold) Winner	
1990	Indonesia Open	(Indonesia) Eddy Kurniawan	15–10, 15–5	(gold) Winner	
1991	Chinese Taipei Open	(Indonesia) Hermawan Susanto	18–15, 11–15, 7–15	(silver) Runner-up	
1991	Japan Open	(China) Wu Wenkai	12–15, 15–4, 15–7	(gold) Winner	
1991	Swedish Open	(Indonesia) Fung Permadi	15–11, 15–6	(gold) Winner	
1991	All England Open	(Malaysia) Foo Kok Keong	15–12, 15–10	(gold) Winner	
1991	Indonesia Open	(Indonesia) Joko Suprianto	15–7, 15–5	(gold) Winner	
1992	Chinese Taipei Open	(Indonesia) Hermawan Susanto	8–15, 15–0, 15–7	(gold) Winner	
1992	Japan Open	(China) Zhao Jianhua	11–15, 15–7, 15–10	(gold) Winner	
1992	Indonesia Open	(Indonesia) Joko Suprianto	15–7, 6–15, 15–9	(gold) Winner	
1992	Singapore Open	(China) Zhao Jianhua	3–15, 1–15	(silver) Runner-up	
1993	Malaysia Open	(Indonesia) Hariyanto Arbi	11–15, 15–5, 17–14	(gold) Winner	
1993	China Open	(Indonesia) Joko Suprianto	8–15, 15–5, 7–15	(silver) Runner-up	
1994	Japan Open	(Indonesia) Hariyanto Arbi	12–15, 15–6, 15–3	(gold) Winner	
1994	Korea Open	(Indonesia) Hermawan Susanto	15–5, 15–8	(gold) Winner	
1994	All England Open	(Indonesia) Hariyanto Arbi	12–15, 14–17	(silver) Runner-up	
1994	Singapore Open	(Indonesia) Hermawan Susanto	15–10, 4–15, 15–9	(gold) Winner	
1994	Indonesia Open	(Indonesia) Joko Suprianto	15–9, 15–8	(gold) Winner	
1994	Hong Kong Open	(Indonesia) Hariyanto Arbi	9–15, 11–15	(silver) Runner-up	
1994	China Open	(Indonesia) Alan Budikusuma	10–15, 12–15	(silver) Runner-up	
1994	World Grand Prix Finals	(Indonesia) Alan Budikusuma	9–15, 15–7, 15–5	(gold) Winner	
1995	Malaysia Open	(Indonesia) Alan Budikusuma	5–15, 8–15	(silver) Runner-up	
1995	Indonesia Open	(Indonesia) Joko Suprianto	15–9, 14–17, 15–9	(gold) Winner	
1995	World Grand Prix Finals	(Indonesia) Joko Suprianto	3–15, 15–6, 6–15	(silver) Runner-up	
1997	Swedish Open	(Indonesia) Budi Santoso	15–10, 15–10	(gold) Winner	
1997	Indonesia Open	(Indonesia) Marleve Mainaky	15–9, 15–3	(gold) Winner	
2000	U.S Open	(Denmark) Anders Boesen	10–15, 15–1, 15–5	(gold) Winner	

Men's doubles
Year	Tournament	Partner	Opponent	Score	Result	Ref.
1990	Australian Open	(Indonesia) Hengky Irawan	(Malaysia) Jalani Sidek (Malaysia) Razif Sidek	8–15, 15–18	(silver) Runner-up	

Mixed doubles
Year	Tournament	Partner	Opponent	Score	Result	Ref.
1990	Australian Open	(Indonesia) Susi Susanti	(Hong Kong) He Tim (Australia) Anna Lao	11–15, 12–15	(silver) Runner-up	

IBF Grand Prix tournament
IBF Grand Prix Finals tournament

=== IBF International (4 titles, 1 runner-up) ===
Men's singles
Year	Tournament	Opponent	Score	Result	Ref.
1993	Hamburg Cup	(Indonesia) Hariyanto Arbi	13–15, 15–9, 15–7	(gold) Winner	
1998	Mexico International	(Netherlands) Tjitte Weistra	15–7, 15–5	(gold) Winner	
1999	Peru International	(Wales) Richard Vaughan	7–15, 15–2, 15–9	(gold) Winner	
1999	Guatemala International	(United States) Kevin Han	12–15, 14–15	(silver) Runner-up	
1999	Mexico International	(Norway) Jim Ronny Andersen	11–15, 15–8, 15–4	(gold) Winner	

=== IBF Junior International (1 title, 1 runner-up) ===
Boys' singles
Year	Tournament	Opponent	Score	Result	Ref.
1984	German Junior	(Germany) Markus Türnich	15–6, 15–11	(gold) Winner	
1986	Duinwijck Junior	(Indonesia) Fung Permadi	11–15, 7–15	(silver) Runner-up	

=== Invitational tournament ===
Men's singles
Year	Tournament	Opponent	Score	Result	Ref.
1988	Asian Invitational Championships	(China) Xiong Guobao	6–15, 7–15	Bronze	
