= Hariyanto Arbi =

Indonesian badminton player (born 1972)

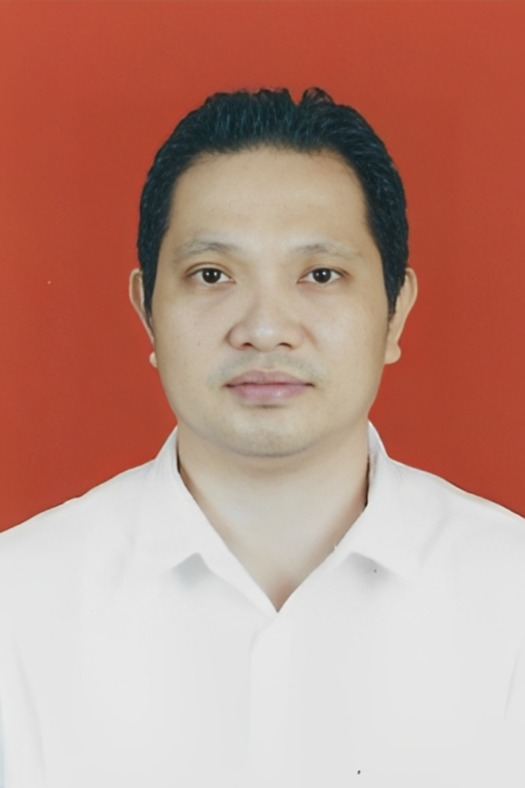

Personal information
- Born: Michael Ludwig Hariyanto Arbi; 21 January 1972 (age 54) Kudus, Central Java, Indonesia
- Height: 1.78 m (5 ft 10 in)

Sport
- Country: Indonesia
- Sport: Badminton
- Handedness: Right

Men's singles
- Highest ranking: 1 (7 February 1995)
- BWF profile
Medal record
Men's badminton
Representing Indonesia
World Championships
Gold medal – first place	1995 Lausanne	Men's singles
Bronze medal – third place	1997 Glasgow	Men's singles
World Cup
Gold medal – first place	1994 Ho Chi Minh	Men's singles
World Masters Games
Gold medal – first place	2009 Sydney	Men's singles 35+
Gold medal – first place	2009 Sydney	Men's doubles 35+
Gold medal – first place	2017 Auckland	Men's doubles 40+
Bronze medal – third place	2017 Auckland	Mixed doubles 40+
Bronze medal – third place	2025 Taipei	Men's doubles 50+
World Senior Championships
Gold medal – first place	2013 Ankara	Men's doubles 35+
Gold medal – first place	2015 Helsingborg	Men's doubles 40+
Gold medal – first place	2023 Jeonju	Men's doubles 50+
Silver medal – second place	2025 Pattaya	Men's doubles 50+
Sudirman Cup
Silver medal – second place	1993 Birmingham	Mixed team
Silver medal – second place	1995 Lausanne	Mixed team
Bronze medal – third place	1997 Glasgow	Mixed team
Thomas Cup
Gold medal – first place	1994 Jakarta	Men's team
Gold medal – first place	1996 Hong Kong	Men's team
Gold medal – first place	1998 Hong Kong	Men's team
Gold medal – first place	2000 Kuala Lumpur	Men's team
Asian Games
Gold medal – first place	1994 Hiroshima	Men's singles
Gold medal – first place	1994 Hiroshima	Men's team
Asian Championships
Gold medal – first place	1993 Hong Kong	Men's team
Asian Cup
Silver medal – second place	1994 Beijing	Men's singles
SEA Games
Gold medal – first place	1993 Singapore	Men's team
Gold medal – first place	1997 Jakarta	Men's singles
Gold medal – first place	1997 Jakarta	Men's team
Silver medal – second place	1993 Singapore	Men's singles

Hariyanto Arbi
- Political party: Indonesian Solidarity Party

Michael Ludwig Hariyanto Arbi (born 21 January 1972) is a former badminton player from Indonesia who rated among the world's top few singles players in the 1990s. He is the younger brother of Eddy Hartono and Hastomo, who were also world class badminton players.

== Career ==
The hard smashing Arbi was arguably the most internationally successful of an cadre of Indonesian singles players who were his contemporaries. These included Ardy Wiranata, Joko Suprianto, Alan Budikusuma, Hermawan Susanto, and Hendrawan. He never won the open singles title of Indonesia which Wiranata dominated in the nineties. This and an Olympic medal were the only prizes that eluded him after he was eliminated in the bronze medal match in 1996. He won the All England Open singles title in 1993 and 1994, and the then biennial IBF World Championship in 1995. Arbi played singles for Indonesian teams that won consecutive Thomas Cup (world men's team) titles in 1994, 1996, 1998, and 2000.

Arbi's other individual victories included the Chinese Taipei Open (1993, 1994), Japan Open (1993, 1995), World Cup (1994), Hong Kong Open (1995), Korea Open (1995), Singapore Open (1997, 1999), SEA Games (1997) and the badminton competition at the quadrennial Asian Games (1994).

== Achievements ==
=== World Championships ===
Men's singles
Year	Venue	Opponent	Score	Result	Ref.
1995	Malley Sports Centre, Lausanne, Switzerland	(South Korea) Park Sung-woo	15–11, 15–8	Gold	
1997	Scotstoun Centre, Glasgow, Scotland	(Denmark) Peter Rasmussen	15–9, 9–15, 2–15	Bronze	

=== World Cup ===
Men's singles
Year	Venue	Opponent	Score	Result	Ref.
1994	Phan Đình Phùng Indoor Stadium, Ho Chi Minh City, Vietnam	(Denmark) Thomas Stuer-Lauridsen	9–7 retired	Gold	

=== World Masters Games ===
Men's singles
Year	Age	Venue	Opponent	Score	Result	Ref.
2009	35+	Sydney Olympic Park Sports Centre; Sydney, Australia	(Japan) Shinya Aoki	15–12, 15–10	Gold	

Men's doubles
Year	Age	Venue	Partner	Opponent	Score	Result	Ref.
2009	35+	Sydney Olympic Park Sports Centre; Sydney, Australia	(Indonesia) Herman Laksono Lioe	(New Zealand) Dean Galt (New Zealand) Kerrin Harrison	15–8, 15–9	Gold	
2017	40+	Auckland Badminton Centre; Auckland, New Zealand	(Indonesia) Tri Kusharjanto	(United States) Tony Gunawan (Indonesia) Effendy Widjaja	22–20, 21–14	Gold	
2025	50+	Taipei Gymnasium; Taipei, Taiwan	(Indonesia) Tri Kusharjanto	(Chinese Taipei) Yang Chih-yu (Chinese Taipei) Liu Ying-hsiung	18–21, 21–19, 15–21	Bronze	

Mixed doubles
Year	Age	Venue	Partner	Opponent	Score	Result	Ref.
2017	40+	Auckland Badminton Centre; Auckland, New Zealand	(Indonesia) Elisabeth Tjandra	(New Zealand) Tjitte Weistra (New Zealand) Doriana Rivera	19–21, 14–21	Bronze	

=== World Senior Championships ===
Men's doubles
Year	Age	Venue	Partner	Opponent	Score	Result	Ref.
2013	35+	Ankara Spor Salunu Stadium; Ankara, Turkey	(Indonesia) Tri Kusharjanto	(England) Lee Clapham (England) Nick Ponting	21–16, 21–11	Gold	
2015	40+	Helsingborg Arena; Helsingborg, Sweden	(Indonesia) Tri Kusharjanto	(Denmark) Peter Rasmussen (Denmark) Thomas Stavngaard	21–19, 21–17	Gold	
2023	50+	Hwasan Indoor Stadium; Jeonju, South Korea	(Indonesia) Marleve Mainaky	(Thailand) Chatchai Boonmee (Thailand) Wittaya Panomchai	21–19, 21–16	Gold	
2025	50+	Eastern National Sports Training Centre; Pattaya, Thailand	(Indonesia) Marleve Mainaky	(Indonesia) Adi Ariyadi (Indonesia) Eko Hamiseno	15–21, 17–21	Silver	

=== Asian Games ===
Men's singles
Year	Venue	Opponent	Score	Result	Ref.
1994	Tsuru Memorial Gymnasium, Hiroshima, Japan	(Indonesia) Joko Suprianto	15–7, 15–1	Gold	

=== Asian Cup ===
Men's singles
Year	Venue	Opponent	Score	Result	Ref.
1994	Beijing Gymnasium, Beijing, China	(China) Dong Jiong	15–12, 17–18, 11–15	Silver	

=== SEA Games ===
Men's singles
Year	Venue	Opponent	Score	Result	Ref.
1993	Singapore Badminton Hall, Singapore	(Indonesia) Joko Suprianto	Walkover	Silver	
1997	Asia-Africa hall, Senayan Sports Complex, Jakarta, Indonesia	(Malaysia) Ong Ewe Hock	15–8, 15–0	Gold	

=== World Junior Championships ===
The Bimantara World Junior Championships was an international invitation badminton tournament for junior players. It was held in Jakarta, Indonesia from 1987 to 1991.

Boys' singles
Year	Venue	Opponent	Score	Result	Ref.
1988	Jakarta, Indonesia	(Denmark) Thomas Stuer-Lauridsen	12–15, 15–2, 14–17	Bronze	
1989	Jakarta, Indonesia	(China) Zeng Yi	15–4, 17–14	Gold	

=== IBF World Grand Prix (12 titles, 7 runners-up) ===
The World Badminton Grand Prix sanctioned by International Badminton Federation (IBF) from 1983 to 2006.

Men's singles
Year	Tournament	Opponent	Score	Result	Ref.
1992	Swiss Open	(Indonesia) Joko Suprianto	12–15, 15–18	(silver) Runner-up	
1992	Hong Kong Open	(China) Wu Wenkai	4–15, 13–15	(silver) Runner-up	
1993	Malaysia Open	(Indonesia) Ardy Wiranata	15–11, 5–15, 14–17	(silver) Runner-up	
1993	All England Open	(Indonesia) Joko Suprianto	15–7, 4–15, 15–11	(gold) Winner	
1993	Chinese Taipei Open	(Denmark) Thomas Stuer-Lauridsen	15–18, 15–6, 15–5	(gold) Winner	
1993	Japan Open	(Indonesia) Joko Suprianto	15–8, 15–12	(gold) Winner	
1993	World Grand Prix Finals	(Indonesia) Joko Suprianto	15–11, 2–15, 1–15	(silver) Runner-up	
1994	Chinese Taipei Open	(Denmark) Thomas Stuer-Lauridsen	15–3, 15–2	(gold) Winner	
1994	Japan Open	(Indonesia) Ardy Wiranata	15–12, 6–15, 3–15	(silver) Runner-up	
1994	All England Open	(Indonesia) Ardy Wiranata	15–12, 17–14	(gold) Winner	
1994	Hong Kong Open	(Indonesia) Ardy Wiranata	15–9, 15–11	(gold) Winner	
1995	All England Open	(Denmark) Poul-Erik Høyer Larsen	16–17, 6–15	(silver) Runner-up	
1995	Japan Open	(Indonesia) Joko Suprianto	15–8, 15–8	(gold) Winner	
1995	Korea Open	(Indonesia) Fung Permadi	15–10, 15–6	(gold) Winner	
1995	Hong Kong Open	(Indonesia) Alan Budikusuma	13–18, 15–13, 15–4	(gold) Winner	
1996	Japan Open	(Indonesia) Joko Suprianto	12–15, 18–14, 4–15	(silver) Runner-up	
1997	Singapore Open	(Indonesia) Indra Wijaya	3–15, 18–14, 15–9	(gold) Winner	
1997	India Open	(India) Pullela Gopichand	15–4, 15–7	(gold) Winner	
1999	Singapore Open	(Indonesia) Taufik Hidayat	13–15, 15–10, 15-11	(gold) Winner	

IBF Grand Prix tournament
IBF Grand Prix Finals tournament

=== IBF International (2 runners-up) ===
Men's singles
Year	Tournament	Opponent	Score	Result	Ref.
1991	Polish International	(Indonesia) Bambang Suprianto	10–15, 15–11, 13–15	(silver) Runner-up	
1993	Hamburg Cup	(Indonesia) Ardy Wiranata	15–13, 9–15, 7–15	(silver) Runner-up	

=== Invitational tournaments ===
Men's singles
Year	Tournament	Opponent	Score	Result	Ref.
1994	Copenhagen Masters	(Denmark) Poul-Erik Høyer Larsen	18–16, 18–13	(gold) Winner	
1997	Copenhagen Masters	(China) Sun Jun	9–15, 7–15	(silver) Runner-up	
