= Hendrawan =

Indonesian badminton coach and former player

Personal information
- Born: Hendrawan; 27 June 1972 (age 54) Malang, East Java, Indonesia
- Height: 1.70 m (5 ft 7 in)
- Weight: 65 kg (143 lb 5 oz)
- Spouse: Silvia Anggraini (m. 2001)

Sport
- Country: Indonesia
- Sport: Badminton
- Handedness: Right
- Event: Men's singles

Men's singles
- BWF profile
Medal record
Men's badminton
Representing Indonesia
Olympic Games
Silver medal – second place	2000 Sydney	Men's singles
World Championships
Gold medal – first place	2001 Seville	Men's singles
Sudirman Cup
Silver medal – second place	2001 Seville	Mixed team
Bronze medal – third place	1999 Copenhagen	Mixed team
Thomas Cup
Gold medal – first place	1998 Hong Kong	Men's team
Gold medal – first place	2000 Kuala Lumpur	Men's team
Gold medal – first place	2002 Guangzhou	Men's team
Asian Games
Gold medal – first place	1998 Bangkok	Men's team
Silver medal – second place	1998 Bangkok	Men's singles
Silver medal – second place	2002 Busan	Men's team
Bronze medal – third place	2002 Busan	Men's singles
Asian Championships
Silver medal – second place	1997 Kuala Lumpur	Men's singles
Asia Cup
Gold medal – first place	1999 Ho Chi Minh	Men's team
Bronze medal – third place	2001 Singapore	Men's team
SEA Games
Silver medal – second place	2001 Kuala Lumpur	Men's team

Hendrawan (Chinese: 葉誠萬; pinyin: Ye Chengwan; born 27 June 1972) is an Indonesian badminton coach and former player. He is a former World champion, Olympic silver medalist, and Asian Champion silver medalist.

== Personal life ==
Hendrawan began to play badminton at 10 years old and began his top-level career at Cipayung National Training Center. He retired from the Indonesian team in 2003. He married his longtime girlfriend, former player Silvia Anggraini, the sister of Hendra Setiawan, on January 7, 2001. The couple has two children, daughter Josephine Sevilla and son Alexander Thomas. The second names of both children showing their parents love of badminton, the daughter is named after the city of Seville, Spain, where Hendrawan was crowned World Champion in 2001 and the son Thomas after the Thomas Cup, which Indonesia won three times with Hendrawan as a key team member. Since 2009, Hendrawan trained Malaysian badminton team players after stints in Indonesia as a national women's singles and then men's singles team coach until his contract was not continued in 2024.

== Career ==
Hendrawan began playing internationally in the early 1990s but at first was overshadowed by a number of his countrymen who rated among the world's elite players. His results gradually improved, peaking at the end of the decade and the beginning of the next. He earned a silver medal at the 2000 Summer Olympics in men's singles, and won men's singles the 2001 World Championships over Denmark's Peter Gade. Hendrawan was an outstanding Thomas Cup (men's world team) performer for Indonesia, winning each of his championship round singles matches in the 1998, 2000, 2002 editions won by Indonesia. In the last of these his final match victory over Malaysia's Roslin Hashim was decisive, breaking a 2–2 tie.

== Achievements ==
=== Olympic Games ===
Men's singles
Year	Venue	Opponent	Score	Result	Ref.
2000	Pavilion 3, Sydney Olympic Park; Sydney, Australia	(China) Ji Xinpeng	4–15, 13–15	Silver	

=== World Championships ===
Men's singles
Year	Venue	Opponent	Score	Result	Ref.
2001	Palacio de Deportes de San Pablo; Seville, Spain	(Denmark) Peter Gade	15–6, 17–16	Gold	

=== Asian Games ===
Men's singles
Year	Venue	Opponent	Score	Result	Ref.
1998	Thammasat Gymnasium 2 Bangkok, Thailand	(China) Dong Jiong	14–18, 15–10, 8–15	Silver	
2002	Gangseo Gymnasium; Busan, South Korea	(South Korea) Lee Hyun-il	3–15, 4–15	Bronze	

=== Asian Championships ===
Men's singles
Year	Venue	Opponent	Score	Result	Ref.
1997	Stadium Negara; Kuala Lumpur, Malaysia	(China) Sun Jun	14–18, 15–8, 9–15	Silver	

=== IBF World Grand Prix (5 titles, 3 runners-up) ===
The World Badminton Grand Prix sanctioned by International Badminton Federation (IBF) from 1983 to 2006.

Men's singles
Year	Tournament	Opponent	Score	Result	Ref.
1993	French Open	(Denmark) Søren B. Nielsen	15–9, 13–18, 15–11	(gold) Winner	
1995	Swiss Open	(Sweden) Jens Olsson	9–15, 9–15	(silver) Runner-up	
1995	Denmark Open	(Denmark) Poul-Erik Høyer Larsen	18–17, 14–17, 16–17	(silver) Runner-up	
1995	Russian Open	(Denmark) Poul-Erik Høyer Larsen	17–14, 15–11	(gold) Winner	
1997	Thailand Open	(China) Chen Gang	15–9, 15–1	(gold) Winner	
1998	Singapore Open	(Denmark) Peter Gade	15–10, 15–8	(gold) Winner	
2000	Japan Open	(China) Ji Xinpeng	15–6, 15–17, 4–15	(silver) Runner-up	
2000	Thailand Open	(Indonesia) Budi Santoso	15–8, 15–10	(gold) Winner	

IBF Grand Prix tournament
IBF Grand Prix Finals tournament

=== IBF International (1 runner-up) ===
Men's singles
Year	Tournament	Opponent	Score	Result	Ref.
1992	Brunei Open	(Indonesia) Fung Permadi	6–15, 1–15	(silver) Runner-up	

== Record against selected opponents ==
Includes results against athletes who competed in World Championships semifinals, and Olympic quarterfinals.

- (China) Bao Chunlai 0–1
- (China) Chen Hong 3–1
- (China) Dong Jiong 3–1
- (China) Ji Xinpeng 0–2
- (China) Sun Jun 2–3
- (China) Xia Xuanze 4–2
- (Chinese Taipei) Fung Permadi 1–2
- (Denmark) Peter Gade 2–1
- (Denmark) Poul-Erik Høyer 3–5
- (Denmark) Thomas Stuer-Lauridsen 1–5
- (Hong Kong) Tam Kai Chuen 4–0
- (India) Pullela Gopichand 1–1
- (Indonesia) Heryanto Arbi 1–3
- (Indonesia) Taufik Hidayat 1–2
- (Indonesia) Joko Suprianto 0–1
- (Indonesia) Ardy B. Wiranata 2–0
- (South Korea) Lee Hyun-il 1–0
- (South Korea) Lee Kwang-jin 1–0
- (South Korea) Park Tae-sang 2–0
- (South Korea) Shon Seung-mo 0–1
- (Singapore) Ronald Susilo 0–2
- (Thailand) Boonsak Ponsana 1–0
