= Fung Permadi =

Chinese Indonesian badminton player

Personal information
- Born: 陳鋒; 30 December 1967 (age 58) Purwokerto, Indonesia
- Height: 1.80 m (5 ft 11 in)

Sport
- Country: Indonesia (1990–1995); Republic of China (Taiwan) (1995–2000)
- Sport: Badminton

Men's singles
- Highest ranking: 1
- BWF profile
Medal record
Men's badminton
Representing Chinese Taipei
World Championships
Silver medal – second place	1999 Copenhagen	Men's singles
Asian Championships
Bronze medal – third place	1999 Kuala Lumpur	Men's singles
Asia Cup
Bronze medal – third place	1997 Jakarta	Men's team
East Asian Games
Gold medal – first place	1997 Busan	Men's singles
Bronze medal – third place	1997 Busan	Men's team
Representing Indonesia
Asian Championships
Bronze medal – third place	1992 Kuala Lumpur	Men's singles
Asian Cup
Bronze medal – third place	1991 Jakarta	Men's singles

Fung Permadi (simplified Chinese: 陈锋; traditional Chinese: 陳鋒; pinyin: Chén Fēng; born 30 December 1967 in Purwokerto, Indonesia) is a former male Chinese Indonesian badminton player. He was a singles specialist who played internationally first for Indonesia and later for Chinese Taipei.

== Career ==
Though Permadi had demonstrated impressive ability by 1990, he was often passed over in selection for international competition at a time when Indonesia had elite world class singles players such as Ardy Wiranata, Alan Budikusuma, Joko Suprianto, Hariyanto Arbi, and Hermawan Susanto. Moving to Taiwan in the middle of the decade, Permadi played perhaps his best badminton in the late 1990s, after his thirtieth birthday. He won a number of significant international titles (as shown by the chart below), and at thirty-one was runner-up to China's Sun Jun at the 1999 IBF World Championships. He competed for Chinese Taipei at the 2000 Summer Olympics in the badminton men's singles event.

== Coaching career ==
He is currently the Head Coach for PB Djarum, Indonesia's most successful badminton club.

== Achievements ==
=== World Championships ===
Men's singles
Year	Venue	Opponent	Score	Result
1999	Brøndby Arena, Copenhagen, Denmark	(China) Sun Jun	6–15, 13–15	Silver

=== Asian Championships ===
Men's singles
Year	Venue	Opponent	Score	Result
1992	Cheras Indoor Stadium, Kuala Lumpur, Malaysia	(Malaysia) Foo Kok Keong	15–11, 12–15, 12–15	Bronze
1999	Kuala Lumpur, Malaysia	(China) Chen Hong	8–15, 15–9, 7–15	Bronze

=== Asian Cup ===
Men's singles
Year	Venue	Opponent	Score	Result
1991	Istora Senayan, Jakarta, Indonesia	(Indonesia) Bambang Suprianto	7–15, 11–15	Bronze

=== East Asian Games ===
Men's singles
Year	Venue	Opponent	Score	Result	Ref.
1997	Pukyong National University Gymnasium, Busan, South Korea	(Japan) Fumihiko Machida	18–13, 15–5	Gold	

=== IBF World Grand Prix ===
The World Badminton Grand Prix sanctioned by International Badminton Federation (IBF) from 1983 to 2006.

Men's singles
Year	Tournament	Opponent	Score	Result
1990	German Open	(Denmark) Jens Peter Nierhoff	Walkover	(gold) Winner
1990	Canada Open	(Indonesia) Bambang Suprianto	15–4, 15–2	(gold) Winner
1990	U.S. Open	(Indonesia) Bambang Suprianto	15–10, 15–8	(gold) Winner
1991	Singapore Open	(Indonesia) Bambang Suprianto	9–15, 8–15	(silver) Runner-up
1993	Swiss Open	(England) Peter Knowles	15–11, 15–9	(gold) Winner
1993	Indonesia Open	(Indonesia) Alan Budi Kusuma	10–15, 17–14, 4–15	(silver) Runner-up
1993	U.S. Open	(Indonesia) Marleve Mainaky	8–15, 8–15	(silver) Runner-up
1995	Korea Open	(Indonesia) Hariyanto Arbi	10–15, 6–15	(silver) Runner-up
1996	China Open	(China) Luo Yigang	15–12, 15–9	(gold) Winner
1996	Hong Kong Open	(Switzerland) Salim	15–12, 15–10	(gold) Winner
1996	World Grand Prix Finals	(China) Sun Jun	15–12, 15–8	(gold) Winner
1998	U.S. Open	(Scotland) Bruce Flockhart	15–8, 15–5	(gold) Winner
1999	Korea Open	(Denmark) Thomas Stuer-Lauridsen	17–14, 15–6	(gold) Winner
1999	Chinese Taipei Open	(Malaysia) Rashid Sidek	16–17, 15–6, 15–7	(gold) Winner
1999	Swiss Open	(Indonesia) Marleve Mainaky	15–13, 15–0	(gold) Winner
1999	China Open	(China) Dong Jiong	2–15, 7–15	(silver) Runner-up

=== IBF Junior International (1 title) ===
Boys' singles
Year	Tournament	Opponent	Score	Result	Ref.
1986	Duinwijck Junior	(Indonesia) Ardy Wiranata	15–11, 15–7	(gold) Winner	
