= Joko Suprianto =

Indonesian badminton player (born 1966)

Personal information
- Born: 21 January 1966 (age 60) Solo, Central Java, Indonesia
- Height: 1.74 m (5 ft 9 in)

Sport
- Country: Indonesia
- Sport: Badminton
- Handedness: Right

Men's singles
- Highest ranking: 1
- BWF profile
Medal record
Men's badminton
Representing Indonesia
World Championships
Gold medal – first place	1993 Birmingham	Men's singles
World Cup
Gold medal – first place	1992 Guangzhou	Men's singles
Gold medal – first place	1995 Jakarta	Men's singles
Silver medal – second place	1993 New Delhi	Men's singles
Silver medal – second place	1997 Yogyakarta	Men's singles
Bronze medal – third place	1994 Ho Chi Minh	Men's singles
World Senior Championships
Bronze medal – third place	2023 Jeonju	Men's singles 55+
Thomas Cup
Gold medal – first place	1994 Jakarta	Men's team
Gold medal – first place	1996 Hong Kong	Men's team
Gold medal – first place	1998 Hong Kong	Men's team
Silver medal – second place	1992 Kuala Lumpur	Men's team
Bronze medal – third place	1990 Nagoya–Tokyo	Men's team
Sudirman Cup
Silver medal – second place	1991 Copenhagen	Mixed team
Silver medal – second place	1993 Birmingham	Mixed team
Bronze medal – third place	1997 Glasgow	Mixed team
Asian Games
Gold medal – first place	1994 Hiroshima	Men's team
Silver medal – second place	1994 Hiroshima	Men's singles
Bronze medal – third place	1990 Beijing	Men's team
Asian Championships
Silver medal – second place	1987 Semarang	Men's team
Silver medal – second place	1989 Shanghai	Men's team
Bronze medal – third place	1992 Kuala Lumpur	Men's singles
Asian Cup
Gold medal – first place	1995 Qingdao	Men's singles
Bronze medal – third place	1991 Jakarta	Men's singles
Bronze medal – third place	1994 Beijing	Men's singles
SEA Games
Gold medal – first place	1993 Singapore	Men's singles
Gold medal – first place	1993 Singapore	Men's team
Gold medal – first place	1995 Chiang Mai	Men's singles
Gold medal – first place	1995 Chiang Mai	Men's team
Gold medal – first place	1997 Jakarta	Men's team
Silver medal – second place	1991 Manila	Men's singles
Silver medal – second place	1991 Manila	Men's team
Bronze medal – third place	1997 Jakarta	Men's singles

Joko Suprianto (born 21 January 1966) is an Indonesian former badminton player who was one of the world's leading men's singles players in the early and mid-1990s, a period during which Indonesia was especially deep in top tier singles players, winning many of the world's major events.

== Career ==
Suprianto became world champion in men's singles in the 1993 IBF World Championships, defeating fellow countryman Hermawan Susanto in the final, and was a member of world champion Indonesian Thomas Cup (men's international) teams in 1994, 1996, and 1998.

He played badminton at the 1996 Summer Olympics in men's singles. He was the #1-seed but was defeated in the quarterfinals by Malaysia's Rashid Sidek 15–5, 15–12. In September 1996, Suprianto once again took top spot in the men's singles world ranking over Chinese top player Dong Jiong.

== Personal life ==
Suprianto married former Indonesian women's double badminton player, Zelin Resiana in 1999, and the two have twins on 24 March 2003, Bilqis Prasista and Bilqis Pratista, both join Djarum Badminton Club. Bilqis Prasista joined Indonesia national badminton team in 2020.

== Achievements ==
=== World Championships ===
Men's singles
Year	Venue	Opponent	Score	Result	Ref.
1993	National Indoor Arena, Birmingham, England	(Indonesia) Hermawan Susanto	15–5, 15–11	Gold	

=== World Cup ===
Men's singles
Year	Venue	Opponent	Score	Result	Ref.
1992	Guangdong Gymnasium, Guangzhou, China	(Indonesia) Hermawan Susanto	18–13, 15–8	Gold	
1993	Indira Gandhi Arena, New Delhi, India	(Indonesia) Alan Budikusuma	8–15, 16–17	Silver	
1994	Phan Đình Phùng Indoor Stadium, Ho Chi Minh City, Vietnam	(Denmark) Thomas Stuer-Lauridsen	15–9, 12–15, 6–15	Bronze	
1995	Istora Senayan, Jakarta, Indonesia	(Indonesia) Alan Budikusuma	15–7, 11–15, 15–8	Gold	
1997	Among Rogo Sports Hall, Yogyakarta, Indonesia	(China) Sun Jun	9–15, 8–15	Silver	

=== World Senior Championships ===
Men's singles
Year	Age	Venue	Opponent	Score	Result	Ref.
2023	55+	Hwasan Indoor Stadium; Jeonju, South Korea	(India) Rajeev Sharma	21–11, 12–21, 22–24	Bronze	

=== Asian Games ===
Men's singles
Year	Venue	Opponent	Score	Result	Ref.
1994	Tsuru Memorial Gymnasium, Hiroshima, Japan	(Indonesia) Hariyanto Arbi	7–15, 1–15	Silver	

=== Asian Championships ===
Men's singles
Year	Venue	Opponent	Score	Result	Ref.
1992	Cheras Indoor Stadium, Kuala Lumpur, Malaysia	(Malaysia) Rashid Sidek	8–15, 17–15, 8–15	Bronze	

=== Asian Cup ===
Men's singles
Year	Venue	Opponent	Score	Result	Ref.
1991	Istora Senayan, Jakarta, Indonesia	(Malaysia) Rashid Sidek	8–15, 15–6, 14–18	Bronze	
1994	Beijing Gymnasium, Beijing, China	(China) Dong Jiong	12–15, 14–15	Bronze	
1995	Xinxing Gymnasium, Qingdao, China	(China) Sun Jun	15–7, 15–8	Gold	

=== SEA Games ===
Men's singles
Year	Venue	Opponent	Score	Result	Ref.
1991	Camp Crame Gymnasium, Manila, Philippines	(Indonesia) Ardy Wiranata	4–15, 6–15	Silver	
1993	Singapore Badminton Hall, Singapore	(Indonesia) Hariyanto Arbi	Walkover	Gold	
1995	Gymnasium 3, 700th Anniversary Sport Complex, Chiang Mai, Thailand	(Indonesia) Ardy Wiranata	15–10, 15–9	Gold	
1997	Asia-Africa hall, Senayan sports complex, Jakarta, Indonesia	(Malaysia) Yong Hock Kin	15–5, 15–3	Bronze	

=== IBF World Grand Prix (14 titles, 12 runners-up) ===
The World Badminton Grand Prix sanctioned by International Badminton Federation (IBF) from 1983 to 2006.

Men's singles
Year	Tournament	Opponent	Score	Result	Ref.
1989	Indonesia Open	(China) Xiong Guobao	0–15, 4–15	(silver) Runner-up	
1990	All England Open	(China) Zhao Jianhua	4–15, 1–15	(silver) Runner-up	
1991	Korea Open	(China) Wu Wenkai	6–15, 2–15	(silver) Runner-up	
1991	Indonesia Open	(Indonesia) Ardy Wiranata	7–15, 5–15	(silver) Runner-up	
1992	Swiss Open	(Indonesia) Hariyanto Arbi	15–12, 18–15	(gold) Winner	
1992	Indonesia Open	(Indonesia) Ardy Wiranata	7–15, 15–6, 9–15	(silver) Runner-up	
1992	German Open	(Indonesia) Alan Budikusuma	11–15, 2–15	(silver) Runner-up	
1992	Thailand Open	(Indonesia) Alan Budikusuma	15–10, 10–15, 15–10	(gold) Winner	
1993	Korea Open	(Denmark) Thomas Stuer-Lauridsen	15–3 18–13	(gold) Winner	
1993	All England Open	(Indonesia) Hariyanto Arbi	7–15, 15–4, 11–15	(silver) Runner-up	
1993	Japan Open	(Indonesia) Hariyanto Arbi	8–15, 12–15	(silver) Runner-up	
1993	China Open	(Indonesia) Ardy Wiranata	15–8, 8–15, 15–7	(gold) Winner	
1993	Thailand Open	(Indonesia) Hermawan Susanto	15–11, 15–3	(gold) Winner	
1993	World Grand Prix Finals	(Indonesia) Hariyanto Arbi	11–15, 15–2, 15–1	(gold) Winner	
1994	Malaysia Open	(Malaysia) Rashid Sidek	15–3, 15–5	(gold) Winner	
1994	Indonesia Open	(Indonesia) Ardy Wiranata	9–15, 8–15	(silver) Runner-up	
1994	Thailand Open	(China) Sun Jun	10–15, 15–11, 15–5	(gold) Winner	
1995	Japan Open	(Indonesia) Hariyanto Arbi	8–15, 8–15	(silver) Runner-up	
1995	Singapore Open	(Indonesia) Hermawan Susanto	15–11, 3–15, 15–10	(gold) Winner	
1995	Indonesia Open	(Indonesia) Ardy Wiranata	9–15, 17–14, 9–15	(silver) Runner-up	
1995	German Open	(Denmark) Poul-Erik Høyer Larsen	17–14, 15–11	(gold) Winner	
1995	World Grand Prix Finals	(Indonesia) Ardy Wiranata	15–3, 6–15, 15–6	(gold) Winner	
1996	Japan Open	(Indonesia) Hariyanto Arbi	15–12, 14–18, 15–4	(gold) Winner	
1996	Indonesia Open	(Indonesia) Budi Santoso	15–8, 15–4	(gold) Winner	
1996	U.S. Open	(Denmark) Poul-Erik Høyer Larsen	15–13, 15–13	(gold) Winner	
1996	Thailand Open	(China) Dong Jiong	13–15, 7–15	(silver) Runner-up	

IBF Grand Prix tournament
IBF Grand Prix Finals tournament

=== Invitational tournament ===
Men's doubles
Year	Tournament	Partner	Opponent	Score	Result	Ref.
1988	Asian Invitational Championships	(Indonesia) Aryono Miranat	(South Korea) Lee Sang-bok (South Korea) Park Joo-bong	8–15, 0–15	Bronze	
