= Peter Rasmussen (badminton) =

Danish badminton player

Personal information
- Born: August 2, 1974 (age 52) Copenhagen, Denmark

Sport
- Country: Denmark
- Sport: Badminton
- Handedness: Left
- Event: Men's singles

Men's singles
- BWF profile
Medal record
Men's badminton
Representing Denmark
World Championships
Gold medal – first place	1997 Glasgow	Men's singles
Sudirman Cup
Bronze medal – third place	1995 Lausanne	Mixed team
Bronze medal – third place	1997 Glasgow	Mixed team
Thomas Cup
Silver medal – second place	1996 Hong Kong	Men's team
Silver medal – second place	2004 Jakarta	Men's team
Bronze medal – third place	1998 Hong Kong	Men's team
Bronze medal – third place	2000 Kuala Lumpur	Men's team
Bronze medal – third place	2002 Guangzhou	Men's team
European Championships
Gold medal – first place	2002 Malmö	Men's singles
Gold medal – first place	1996 Herning	Mixed team
Gold medal – first place	1998 Sofia	Mixed team
Gold medal – first place	2002 Malmö	Mixed team
Silver medal – second place	1996 Herning	Men's singles
Bronze medal – third place	1998 Sofia	Men's singles

Peter Rasmussen (born 2 August 1974) is a Danish badminton player. He is a former World Champion and European Champion.

== Career ==
The crowning achievement of his career was winning the Men's Singles at the 1997 IBF World Championships in Glasgow, Scotland. It was the first time a Dane and a non- Asian player captured that title since Flemming Delfs won at the first-ever IBF World Championships held in Sweden in 1977. The Men's Finals in 1997 is regarded as one of the best badminton matches played ever because of both the duration and quality of the match. In the end, Peter Rasmussen's opponent, Sun Jun of China cramped up and could barely continue. Rasmussen capitalized on the opportunity and closed out his three-game victory, 16-17, 18-13, 15-10.

Rasmussen has often been called Den Hvide Kineser or The White Chinaman. This is not only due to his playing style which featured speedy footwork and powerful jump-smashes (typically a hallmark of Chinese badminton players), but also because of his spiritual interests. He educated himself in acupuncture and practiced it to help overcome injures. He studied Miyamoto Musashi and believed in a philosophy of strategy, rather than one of results which he saw as predominant among elite players.

At the 1999 China Open, Rasmussen knocked out the 16-year old Lin Dan in the first round 6-15, 15-8, 15-4. This was to be their only career encounter, making Rasmussen one of the select few players with a winning head-to-head over the Chinese.

Rasmussen suffered a career ending foot injury on 25 September 2004, during the Men's Singles Final of the 2004 U.S. Open (badminton). He was forced to retire while leading the score 12-7 in the first game against Lee Yen Hui Kendrick. He attempted to rehabilitate but on 9 February 2005 he announced his retirement from international competition due to lack of progress.

The final match he played for the Danish national team was in the 2004 Thomas Cup semi-finals. Denmark and Indonesia were tied 2-2, and Peter Rasmussen vs Simon Santoso would decide who advanced to the finals against China. Rasmussen won the match in straight sets, 15-3, 15-12. Rasmussen considers this match, in front of 12,000 Indonesian spectators, to be the highlight of his career.

Peter Rasmussen was sponsored by Carlton, which marketed a lineup of racquets bearing his name, including the Rasmussen Titanium, Rasmussen Lite, Rasmussen Superlite, and the Rasmussen Tour. His racquet of choice was the Rasmussen Superlite. Due to his retirement, the Rasmussen lineup has reverted to the previous designation of Airblade. Prior to introducing this lineup of rackets, he used the Carlton AS-1 Ti.

Upon his retirement, Rasmussen set his sights on finishing his degree in medicine. He was also thinking about creating a website about his mental approach to badminton.

== Musashi and Bushido ==
Peter claims that the reason why he was so successful on the badminton court was because of his studies of Bushido, an ancient Japanese philosophy and his mentor, Miyamoto Musashi, a great samurai. Miyamoto Musashi began his “warrior’s pilgrimage” at age 13 when he began to train as a swordsmen and as a practicing Bushido Warrior. Legend claims that he killed his first opponent at age 14 in one of the 60 duels he fought over his lifetime. It is said that he was never defeated, both in single combat and during the 6 wars, in which he took part. At age 35, Musashi sheathed his sword to become a mentor, an artist and finally a writer, who penned one of Japan’s most influential pieces of literature – “The Book of the Five Rings.” Rasmussen had to face the fact of losing before he can entertain the thought of winning. Peter proved that his philosophy of playing badminton was very successful. After finding Bushido and practicing it, Peter went on a 6-month winning streak that culminated tournaments such as the Japan Open, the Nordic Championship, the Danish Championship and finally the World Championships.

== Under Pressure ==
Peter is well known for his actions while responding to pressure. He claims that he does not play to win, he says that Bushido dictates that "walking the path is enough", the fact that he was playing badminton humbled him. Various examples of Bushido in work included when Peter, just entering the Danish National Camp, was playing in the Danish National Championships had to face the fourth seeded Peter Janum in the quarters, who was heavily favored to win the tournament. But the resilient Peter Rasmussen came out and beat Janum 15-1, 15-2 in less than 25 minutes.

At the European Championships in 2002, Peter had to face country-man Anders Boesen, this was after a four-year lay-off period for Peter who was recovering from foot injury. Boesen ranked 5th in the World at the time, was leading Rasmussen 5-1 in the final set but Rasmssusen seemed to have ignored the pressure completely and came back to win 7-5 and a ticket to face another country-man, Kenneth Jonasson, Rasmussen was outclassed in the first set losing 7-0 to the World #2 ranked player. But with a level of focus rarely seen in sports, Rasmussen fought back to take the match in a grueling 5 sets.

Peter's most impressive match was probably at the Thomas Cup Finals where Denmark was facing Indonesia for a ticket to play China in the finals. Denmark took the first two Men's Doubles matches, but Peter Gade crumpled under the pressure of Indo first singles player Sony Dwi Kuncoro. Kenneth Jonassen followed suit by losing to future Olympic Gold and World Champion Taufik Hidayat. So the spotlight was again on Peter Rasmussen to step up, and step up he did. He beat the youngster from Indonesia, Simon Santoso in front of 12,000 screaming Indonesian fans in straight sets, 15-3, 15-12.

== Post-retirement ==
Peter, who has devoted much of his life to badminton and gave everything that he had, did not want to stop after retiring from the pro circuit in February 2005. He is now completing his medical studies and is also a manager for the Badminton Players Federation, the union representing the professional badminton players under the banner of the Badminton World Federation (formerly International Badminton Federation, formerly World Badminton Federation).

== 2004 Badminton Revolution Cup ==
Prior to his announcing of his retirement, Peter was contacted by Bobby Milroy, the current president of the BPF, to offer Peter the chance to come to Canada, Milroy's country to participate in what was known as the 2004 Revolution Cup. The Revolution Cup was the biggest badminton tournament to go to Canada since the World Championships held in Calgary in 1985. An official DVD of the tournament is also available .

== Return to Badminton ==
Peter Rasmussen has marked his return to playing badminton at the Danish Club level for Vendsyssel Badminton Club along with Malaysian badminton player Muhammad Roslin Hashim. Peter says that this is probably as far as he will go, that he will not be trying to get back onto the Danish National Team.

== Quotes ==
- "I've always trained hard - perhaps too hard, too - but it's been worth it. Badminton has given me incredibly much. I have put it this way: Badminton is life and life is badminton."
- "I have always joked that I am sharp as a sword, that I have the deciding strike that wins the important points. But all players can reach a pure state without conscious thought, where instinct dictates action. That is where you have to go, if you are to use your potential optimally."
- "If you think too much about the possible moves, you obstruct yourself. The same applies to thinking about victory or defeat. You cannot think about how much you want to win without the mind automatically generating defeat as a possibility, and that creates fear. When that happens, you hold back and play cautiously, basically you play below standard."
- "I am a bit sorry to end it in this fashion. This is not exactly how I planned to place the period [on my career]. It doesn't help that I feel that I have the desire and ability to be among the best in the world. It will be difficult without badminton. I have worked hard on accepting my situation and in my heart-of-hearts, I am OK with saying goodbye to the sport that has been everything to me since my youth." - announcing his retirement.
- “ They are both great players and they achieved a great deal in their careers but I do something different. They are all focused on their results. They want to win, they want to achieve their goals, and of course so do I. The difference is that I put my focus elsewhere. Bushido teaches that to walk "The Path" is a goal in itself. Results are places on the road that will happen as you take the journey, but they are not the focus. The process is where my focus is and it is where I differ from every other Danish Player in history.” - speaking of fellow country-men Anders Boesen and Kenneth Johnassen after the 2002 European Championships.

== Achievements ==
Apart from all the tournament victories Peter has accomplished, he and finalist of the IBF World Championships in 1997, Sun Jun hold the longest game record at 124 minutes.

=== Danish National Championships ===
- 1991 Under 18 Men's Singles: Finalist
- 1992 Under 18 Men's Singles: Champion
- 1994 Men's Singles: Quarter finalist
- 1995 Men's Singles: Quarter finalist
- 1997 Men's Singles: Champion
- 1998 Men's Singles: Finalist
- 1999 Men's Singles: Champion

=== Nordic Championships ===
- 1991 Under 18 Men's Doubles: Finalist (partner Jimmy Mørch Sørensen)
- 1995 Men's Singles: Quarter Finalist
- 1997 Men's Singles: Champion

=== World Championships ===
Men's singles
Year	Venue	Opponent	Score	Result
1997	Scotstoun Centre, Glasgow, Scotland	(China) Sun Jun	16–17, 18–13, 15–10	Gold

=== European Championships ===
Men's singles
Year	Venue	Opponent	Score	Result
1996	Herning, Denmark	(Denmark) Poul-Erik Høyer Larsen	5–15, 11–15	Silver
1998	Sofia, Bulgaria	(Denmark) Peter Gade	Walkover	Bronze
2002	Malmö, Sweden	(Denmark) Kenneth Jonassen	0–7, 7–5, 3–7, 7–5, 7–2	Gold

=== IBF World Grand Prix ===
The World Badminton Grand Prix sanctioned by International Badminton Federation (IBF) from 1983 to 2006.

Men's singles
Year	Tournament	Opponent	Score	Result
1993	Finnish Open	(Denmark) Peter Espersen	4–15, 5–15	(silver) Runner-up
1994	Dutch Open	(Denmark) Poul-Erik Høyer Larsen	7–15, 7–15	(silver) Runner-up
1997	Japan Open	(South Korea) Park Sung-woo	15–3, 15–1	(gold) Winner
2002	U.S. Open	(Denmark) Peter Gade	14–17, 17–15, 1–15	(silver) Runner-up
2002	Puerto Rico Open	(Japan) Yousuke Nakanishi	15–4, 15–5	(gold) Winner
2004	U.S. Open	(Singapore) Kendrick Lee	7–12, retired	(silver) Runner-up

=== IBF International ===
Men's singles
Year	Tournament	Opponent	Score	Result
1994	Norwegian International	(Finland) Lasse Lindelof	15–5, 15–4	(gold) Winner
1994	Welsh International	(Austria) Peter Kreulitsch	15–8, 15–8	(gold) Winner
1995	Amor Tournament	(Denmark) Martin Lundgaard Hansen	15–7, 15–9	(gold) Winner

== Sources ==
- Peter Rasmussen (in Danish) official Danmarks Badminton Forbund profile, retrieved 16 May 2006.
- En dansk samurai (in Danish) by Christian W. Larsen, Team Danmark, 28 April 2005, retrieved 16 May 2006.
- Peter Rasmussen stopper karrieren (in Danish), 9 February 2005, official Danmarks Badminton Forbund press release announcing retirement, retrieved 16 May 2006.
