= Jeroen van Dijk =

Dutch badminton player

Personal information
- Full name: Jeroen Michiel Laurens van Dijk
- Country: Netherlands
- Born: 26 August 1971 (age 53); Rotterdam, Netherlands
- Height: 1.93 m (6 ft 4 in)
- Handedness: Right
Medal record
Men's badminton
Representing Netherlands
European Championships
| Bronze medal – third place | 1996 Herning | Men's singles |
European Junior Championships
| Bronze medal – third place | 1989 Manchester | Boys' doubles |
- BWF profile

Jeroen van Dijk (born 26 August 1971) is a Dutch badminton player. He competed in the men's singles tournament at the 1996 Summer Olympics. van Dijk won the Dutch men's championship in 1922 and 1993, defeating Pierre Pelupessy both times. In April 1996 van Dijk defeated Daniel Ericsson in the European Championships to secure at least a bronze. In his later career, van Dijk became a coach, serving as Head Coach at the Badminton Europe Centre of Excellence.
