= Dong Jiong =

Chinese badminton player (born 1973)

Dong Jiong 董炯
Personal information
- Born: 20 August 1973 (age 53) Beijing, China
- Height: 1.79 m (5 ft 10 in)
- Weight: 68 kg (150 lb)

Sport
- Country: China
- Sport: Badminton
- Handedness: Right

Men's singles
- Highest ranking: 1
- BWF profile
Medal record
Men's badminton
Representing China
Olympic Games
Silver medal – second place	1996 Atlanta	Men's singles
World Cup
Gold medal – first place	1996 Jakarta	Men's singles
Sudirman Cup
Gold medal – first place	1995 Lausanne	Mixed team
Gold medal – first place	1997 Glasgow	Mixed team
Gold medal – first place	1999 Copenhagen	Mixed team
Thomas Cup
Bronze medal – third place	1994 Jakarta	Men's team
Bronze medal – third place	1996 Hong Kong	Men's team
Bronze medal – third place	1998 Hong Kong	Men's team
Asian Games
Gold medal – first place	1998 Bangkok	Men's singles
Silver medal – second place	1998 Bangkok	Men's team
Bronze medal – third place	1994 Hiroshima	Men's singles
Bronze medal – third place	1994 Hiroshima	Men's team
Asian Championships
Bronze medal – third place	1995 Beijing	Men's singles
Asian Cup
Gold medal – first place	1994 Beijing	Men's singles
East Asian Games
Gold medal – first place	1993 Shanghai	Men's team
Bronze medal – third place	1993 Shanghai	Men's singles

Dong Jiong (Chinese: 董炯; born 20 August 1973) is a Chinese badminton player who ranked among the world's men's singles elite in the mid and late 1990s.

== Career ==
In a relatively short career at the top level, Dong won some of badminton's biggest events, including the prestigious All England and Denmark Open titles in 1997. He was a silver medalist at the 1996 Olympic Games in Atlanta, losing the final in two close games to Denmark's Poul-Erik Hoyer Larsen. Among Dong's badminton achievements were victories at the Thailand Open (1995, 1996), China Open (1995, 1997, 1999), Swiss Open (1997), World Cup (1996), and quadrennial Asian Games (1998). The successes of Dong and his contemporary and rival Sun Jun marked the start of a revival in men's badminton fortunes for China, which, after dominating in the 1980s, had lost the initiative to Indonesia.

Dong retired in 2001 without any job offer or pension from his employer, the Beijing municipal sports bureau. Rekindling his passion for cultivating the badminton sport, Dong built up a franchise that includes five amateur badminton clubs, and was hired as the head coach of China's Paralympic badminton team. Dong felt lucky he could carry his own legacy in the amateur sport arena. He picked up new knowledge and confidence outside the top sport environment.

Coaching players with disabilities since 2009, Dong focused his efforts on them at his clubs. He has spent money each year on improving the facilities while applying for an entry to the 2016 Paralympic Games.

== Achievements ==
=== Olympic Games ===
Men's singles
Year	Venue	Opponent	Score	Result
1996	Georgia State University Gymnasium; Atlanta, United States	(Denmark) Poul-Erik Høyer Larsen	12–15, 10–15	Silver

=== World Cup ===
Men's singles
Year	Venue	Opponent	Score	Result
1996	Istora Senayan; Jakarta, Indonesia	(Indonesia) Jeffer Rosobin	15–5, 15–8	Gold

=== Asian Games ===
Men's singles
Year	Venue	Opponent	Score	Result
1994	Tsuru Memorial Gymnasium; Hiroshima, Japan	(Indonesia) Hariyanto Arbi	7–15, 7–15	Bronze
1998	Thammasat Gymnasium 2 Bangkok, Thailand	(Indonesia) Hendrawan	17–14, 10–15, 15–8	Gold

=== Asian Championships ===
Men's singles
Year	Venue	Opponent	Score	Result
1995	Olympic Sports Center Gymnasium; Beijing, China	(South Korea) Park Sung-woo	16–18, 12–15	Bronze

=== Asian Cup ===
Men's singles
Year	Venue	Opponent	Score	Result
1994	Beijing Gymnasium; Beijing, China	(Indonesia) Heryanto Arbi	12–15, 18–17, 15–11	Gold

=== East Asian Games ===
Men's singles
Year	Venue	Opponent	Score	Result
1993	Shanghai, China	(China) Liu Jun	8–15, 1–15	Bronze

=== IBF World Grand Prix ===
The World Badminton Grand Prix sanctioned by International Badminton Federation (IBF) from 1983 to 2006.

Men's singles
Year	Tournament	Opponent	Score	Result
1995	U.S. Open	(Indonesia) Hermawan Susanto	10–15, 3–15	(silver) Runner-up
1995	China Open	(Denmark) Poul-Erik Høyer Larsen	15–8, 15–9	(gold) Winner
1995	Thailand Open	(South Korea) Kim Hak-kyun	15–13, 15–7	(gold) Winner
1996	Chinese Taipei Open	(Malaysia) Rashid Sidek	15–11, 15–4	(gold) Winner
1996	Thailand Open	(Indonesia) Joko Supriyanto	15–13, 15–7	(gold) Winner
1997	All England Open	(China) Sun Jun	15–9, 15–5	(gold) Winner
1997	Swiss Open	(Denmark) Poul-Erik Høyer Larsen	17–15, 15–11	(gold) Winner
1997	Denmark Open	(Denmark) Peter Gade	15–17, 15–11, 15–12	(gold) Winner
1997	China Open	(China) Luo Yigang	15–10, 15–2	(gold) Winner
1997	World Grand Prix Finals	(China) Sun Jun	9–15, 6–15	(silver) Runner-up
1998	Brunei Open	(Indonesia) Taufik Hidayat	15–12, 3–15, 9–15	(silver) Runner-up
1998	Denmark Open	(Denmark) Peter Gade	8–15, 14–17	(silver) Runner-up
1999	China Open	(Chinese Taipei) Fung Permadi	15–2, 15–7	(gold) Winner

=== IBF International ===
Men's singles
Year	Tournament	Opponent	Score	Result
2000	Victoria International	(Australia) Rio Suryana	15–9, 15–3	(gold) Winner

Men's doubles
Year	Tournament	Partner	Opponent	Score	Result
2000	Victoria International	(China) Jiang Xin	(Poland) Michał Łogosz (Poland) Robert Mateusiak	10–15, 15–17	(silver) Runner-up
