= Yong Hock Kin =

Malaysian badminton player

Yong Hock Kin 杨福景
Personal information
- Born: 14 June 1974 (age 52) Negeri Sembilan, Malaysia
- Years active: 1990-2003
- Height: 1.76 m (5 ft 9 in)

Sport
- Country: Malaysia
- Sport: Badminton
- Handedness: Left
- Event: Men's singles

Men's singles
- BWF profile
Medal record
Representing Malaysia
Men's badminton
Thomas Cup
Silver medal – second place	1998 Hong Kong	Team
Commonwealth Games
Gold medal – first place	1998 Kuala Lumpur	Men's team
Silver medal – second place	1998 Kuala Lumpur	Men's singles
Asian Games
Bronze medal – third place	1998 Bangkok	Men's team
Bronze medal – third place	1998 Bangkok	Men's singles
Asian Championships
Bronze medal – third place	1993 Hong Kong	Men's team
Southeast Asian Games
Silver medal – second place	1997 Jakarta	Men's team

Yong Hock Kin AMN (born 14 June 1976) is a former badminton player from Malaysia.

== Achievements ==
=== Asian Games ===
Men's singles
Year	Venue	Opponent	Score	Result
1998	Thammasat Gymnasium 2 Bangkok, Thailand	(China) Dong Jiong	5–15, 10–15	Bronze

=== Commonwealth Games ===
Men's singles
Year	Venue	Opponent	Score	Result
1998	Kuala Lumpur Badminton Stadium; Kuala Lumpur, Malaysia	(Malaysia) Wong Choong Hann	15–10, 12–15, 6–15	Silver

=== IBF World Grand Prix ===
The World Badminton Grand Prix sanctioned by International Badminton Federation (IBF) from 1983 to 2006.

Men's singles
Year	Tournament	Opponent	Score	Result
1998	Indonesia Open	(Indonesia) Budi Santoso	15–7, 15–6	(gold) Winner
2001	Thailand Open	(Thailand) Boonsak Ponsana	7–8, 5–7, 8–6, 7–1, 7–1	(gold) Winner

== Honour ==
- Member of the Order of the Defender of the Realm (A.M.N.) (2000).
