= Ong Ewe Hock =

Malaysian badminton player (born 1972)

Ong Ewe Hock 王友福
Personal information
- Born: 14 March 1972 (age 54) Penang, Malaysia
- Years active: 1990–2004
- Height: 1.72 m (5 ft 8 in)

Sport
- Country: Malaysia
- Sport: Badminton
- Handedness: Right
- Event: Men's singles

Men's singles
- BWF profile
Medal record
Representing Malaysia
Men's badminton
World Cup
Bronze medal – third place	1997 Yogyakarta	Men's singles
World Senior Championships
Bronze medal – third place	2025 Pattaya	Men's doubles 50+
Thomas Cup
Silver medal – second place	1994 Jakarta	Team
Silver medal – second place	1998 Hong Kong	Team
Silver medal – second place	2002 Guangzhou	Team
Commonwealth Games
Gold medal – first place	1998 Kuala Lumpur	Men's team
Silver medal – second place	1994 Victoria	Men's singles
Silver medal – second place	1994 Victoria	Mixed team
Bronze medal – third place	1994 Victoria	Men's doubles
Asian Games
Bronze medal – third place	1994 Hiroshima	Men's team
Bronze medal – third place	2002 Busan	Men's team
Asian Championships
Silver medal – second place	1999 Kuala Lumpur	Men's singles
Bronze medal – third place	1993 Hong Kong	Men's team
Asian Cup
Bronze medal – third place	1996 Seoul	Men's singles
Asia Cup
Silver medal – second place	1997 Jakarta	Men's team
Southeast Asian Games
Gold medal – first place	2001 Kuala Lumpur	Men's team
Silver medal – second place	1993 Singapore	Men's team
Silver medal – second place	1995 Chiang Mai	Men's team
Silver medal – second place	1997 Jakarta	Men's singles
Silver medal – second place	1997 Jakarta	Men's team
Bronze medal – third place	1993 Singapore	Men's singles
Bronze medal – third place	1995 Chiang Mai	Men's singles

Ong Ewe Hock

Chinese name
- Simplified Chinese: 王友福
- Hanyu Pinyin: Wáng Yǒu Fú

Ong Ewe Hock AMN (Chinese: 王友福; pinyin: Wáng Yǒu Fú; born 14 March 1972) is a former badminton player from Malaysia. He is the younger brother of Ong Ewe Chye.

== Achievements ==
=== World Cup ===
Men's singles
Year	Venue	Opponent	Score	Result
1997	Among Rogo Sports Hall, Yogyakarta, Indonesia	(China) Sun Jun	1–15, 11–15	Bronze

=== World Senior Championships ===
Men's doubles
Year	Age	Venue	Partner	Opponent	Score	Result	Ref.
2025	50+	Eastern National Sports Training Centre; Pattaya, Thailand	(Malaysia) Goh Cheng Huan	(Indonesia) Hariyanto Arbi (Indonesia) Marleve Mainaky	17–21, 21–19, 13–21	Bronze	

=== Asian Championships ===
Men's singles
Year	Venue	Opponent	Score	Result
1999	Kuala Lumpur, Malaysia	(China) Chen Hong	11–15, 8–15	Silver

=== Asian Cup ===
Men's singles
Year	Venue	Opponent	Score	Result
1996	Olympic Gymnasium No. 2 Seoul, South Korea	(China) Luo Yigang	12–15, 13–18	Bronze

=== Southeast Asian Games ===
Men's singles
Year	Venue	Opponent	Score	Result
1993	Singapore Badminton Hall; Singapore	(Indonesia) Joko Suprianto	16–17, 4–15	Bronze
1995	Gymnasium 3, 700th Anniversary Sport Complex; Chiang Mai, Thailand	(Indonesia) Joko Suprianto	7–15, 7–15	Bronze
1997	Asia-Africa hall, Senayan sports complex Jakarta, Indonesia	(Indonesia) Hariyanto Arbi	8–15, 0–15	Silver

=== Commonwealth Games ===
Men's singles
Year	Venue	Opponent	Score	Result
1994	McKinnon Gym, University of Victoria, British Columbia, Canada	(Malaysia) Rashid Sidek	6–15, 4–15	Silver

Men's doubles
Year	Venue	Partner	Opponent	Score	Result
1994	McKinnon Gym, University of Victoria, British Columbia, Canada	(Malaysia) Tan Kim Her	(England) Simon Archer (England) Chris Hunt	1–15, 7–15	Bronze

=== IBF World Grand Prix ===
The World Badminton Grand Prix sanctioned by International Badminton Federation (IBF) since from 1983 to 2006.

Men's singles
Year	Tournament	Opponent	Score	Result
1996	Malaysia Open	(Indonesia) Indra Wijaya	1–15, 15–1, 15–7	(gold) Winner
1996	Denmark Open	(Denmark) Thomas Stuer-Lauridsen	15–6, 7–15, 12–15	(silver) Runner-up
1996	German Open	(Malaysia) Rashid Sidek	11–15, 2–15	(silver) Runner-up
1998	All England Open	(China) Sun Jun	1–15, 7–15	(silver) Runner-up
2000	Indonesia Open	(Indonesia) Taufik Hidayat	5–15, 13–15	(silver) Runner-up
2001	Malaysia Open	(Indonesia) Rony Agustinus	3–7, 7–2, 7–0, 6–8, 7–1	(gold) Winner
2002	Malaysia Open	(Malaysia) James Chua	10–15, 6–15	(silver) Runner-up

== Honours ==
- Member of the Order of the Defender of the Realm (A.M.N.) (2000).
