= Badminton at the 1998 Asian Games – Men's doubles =

Men's doubles at the 1998 Asian Games
- Venue: Thammasat Gymnasium 2
- Dates: 13–17 December 1998
- Competitors: 40 from 12 nations

Medalists
| gold medal | Ricky Subagja; Rexy Mainaky | Indonesia |
| silver medal | Pramote Teerawiwatana; Siripong Siripool | Thailand |
| bronze medal | Liu Yong; Yu Jinhao | China |
| bronze medal | Lee Dong-soo; Yoo Yong-sung | South Korea |

The badminton men's doubles tournament at the 1998 Asian Games in Bangkok took place from 13 December to 17 December at Thammasat Gymnasium 2.

== Schedule ==
All times are Indochina Time (UTC+07:00)

| Date | Time | Event |
|---|---|---|
| Sunday, 13 December 1998 | 13:00 | 1st round |
| Monday, 14 December 1998 | 13:00 | 2nd round |
| Tuesday, 15 December 1998 | 13:00 | Quarterfinals |
| Wednesday, 16 December 1998 | 13:00 | Semifinals |
| Thursday, 17 December 1998 | 13:00 | Final |

== Results ==
=== Final ===
| Final |
| 1 | Ricky Subagja (INA); Rexy Mainaky (INA) | 15 | 15 |
| 3 | Pramote Teerawiwatana (THA); Siripong Siripool (THA) | 5 | 10 |

=== Top half ===
1st round
Sadegh Karbasi (IRI); Afshin Bozorgzadeh (IRI) | 0 | 4
Lee Sung-yuan (TPE); Lin Wei-hsiang (TPE) | 15 | 15

2nd round
1 | Ricky Subagja (INA); Rexy Mainaky (INA) | 15 | 15
Chhea Chhorvann (CAM); Krang Sokhang (CAM) | 2 | 2
Khunakorn Sudhisodhi (THA); Kitipon Kitikul (THA) | 15 | 15
Lee Sung-yuan (TPE); Lin Wei-hsiang (TPE) | 3 | 8
4 | Liu Yong (CHN); Yu Jinhao (CHN) | 15 | 15
Shinji Ota (JPN); Hidetaka Yamada (JPN) | 10 | 4
Kang Kyung-jin (KOR); Ha Tae-kwon (KOR) | 15 | 15
Yau Kwun Yuen (HKG); Chow Kin Man (HKG) | 2 | 3

Quarterfinals
1 | Ricky Subagja (INA); Rexy Mainaky (INA) | 15 | 15
Khunakorn Sudhisodhi (THA); Kitipon Kitikul (THA) | 1 | 12
4 | Liu Yong (CHN); Yu Jinhao (CHN) | 15 | 15
Kang Kyung-jin (KOR); Ha Tae-kwon (KOR) | 13 | 9

Semifinals
1 | Ricky Subagja (INA); Rexy Mainaky (INA) | 15 | 15
4 | Liu Yong (CHN); Yu Jinhao (CHN) | 10 | 11

=== Bottom half ===
1st round
Chan Chong Ming (MAS); Jeremy Gan (MAS) | 15 | 15
Fumihiko Machida (JPN); Seiichi Watanabe (JPN) | 12 | 9
Ian Gil Piencenaves (PHI); Kennevic Asuncion (PHI) | 14 | 8
Ma Che Kong (HKG); Liu Kwok Wa (HKG) | 17 | 15
Lee Dong-soo (KOR); Yoo Yong-sung (KOR) | 15 | 15
Wajid Ali (PAK); Ashraf Masih (PAK) | 0 | 1

2nd round
Chan Chong Ming (MAS); Jeremy Gan (MAS) | 15 | 14 | 15
Lee Wei-jen (TPE); Horng Shin-jeng (TPE) | 12 | 17 | 10
Ma Che Kong (HKG); Liu Kwok Wa (HKG) | 10 | 5
3 | Pramote Teerawiwatana (THA); Siripong Siripool (THA) | 15 | 15
Lee Dong-soo (KOR); Yoo Yong-sung (KOR) | 15 | 15
Candra Wijaya (INA); Tony Gunawan (INA) | 11 | 13
Gholamreza Bagheri (IRI); Reza Roshanomid (IRI) | 1 | 3
2 | Zhang Jun (CHN); Zhang Wei (CHN) | 15 | 15

Quarterfinals
Chan Chong Ming (MAS); Jeremy Gan (MAS) | 7 | 15 | 4
3 | Pramote Teerawiwatana (THA); Siripong Siripool (THA) | 15 | 13 | 15
Lee Dong-soo (KOR); Yoo Yong-sung (KOR) | 15 | 15
2 | Zhang Jun (CHN); Zhang Wei (CHN) | 7 | 11

Semifinals
3 | Pramote Teerawiwatana (THA); Siripong Siripool (THA) | 16 | 15 | 15
Lee Dong-soo (KOR); Yoo Yong-sung (KOR) | 17 | 6 | 7
