= 1999 IBF World Championships – Mixed doubles =

Mixed doubles at the 1999 IBF World Championships
- Venue: Brøndby Arena
- Location: Copenhagen, Denmark
- Dates: May 10, 1999 – May 23, 1999

Medalists
gold medal	Kim Dong-moon; Ra Kyung-min	South Korea
silver medal	Simon Archer; Joanne Goode	England
bronze medal	Liu Yong; Ge Fei	China
bronze medal	Michael Søgaard; Rikke Olsen	Denmark

The 1999 IBF World Championships (World Badminton Championships) were held in Copenhagen, Denmark, between 10 May and 23 May 1999. Following the results of the mixed doubles.

== Main stage ==
=== Section 1 ===
First round
(South Korea) Kim Dong-moon (South Korea) Ra Kyung-min	15	15
(Russia) Pavel Uvarov (Russia) Ella Karachkova	7	1
(England) Chris Hunt (England) Donna Kellogg	15	15
(South Korea) Lee Hyo-jung (South Korea) Lee Hyun-il	7	3
(Malaysia) Chan Chong Ming (Malaysia) Joanne Quay	15	15
(Slovenia) Andrej Pohar (Slovenia) Maja Pohar	4	5
(Scotland) Alastair Gatt (Scotland) Kirsteen McEwan	15	15
(Brazil) Leandro Santos (Brazil) Fernanda Kumasaka	8	3
(Denmark) Jon Holst-Christensen (Denmark) Ann Jørgensen	15	15
(Germany) Boris Reichel (Germany) Nicol Pitro	5	3
(China) Zhang Jun (China) Gao Ling	15	15
(Bulgaria) Mihail Popov (Bulgaria) Diana Koleva	7	3
(Netherlands) Quinten van Dalm (Netherlands) Nicole van Hooren	15	15
(Canada) Iain Sydie (Canada) Denyse Julien	13	12
(Hong Kong) Liu Kwok Wa (Hong Kong) Louisa Koon Wai Chee	15	15
(Ukraine) Dmitry Miznikov (Ukraine) Natalja Esipenko	10	13

Second round
(South Korea) Kim Dong-moon (South Korea) Ra Kyung-min	15	15
(England) Chris Hunt (England) Donna Kellogg	4	6
(Malaysia) Chan Chong Ming (Malaysia) Joanne Quay	15	15
(Scotland) Alastair Gatt (Scotland) Kirsteen McEwan	4	4
(Denmark) Jon Holst-Christensen (Denmark) Ann Jørgensen	17	15
(China) Zhang Jun (China) Gao Ling	15	10
(Netherlands) Quinten van Dalm (Netherlands) Nicole van Hooren	15	15
(Hong Kong) Liu Kwok Wa (Hong Kong) Louisa Koon Wai Chee	1	2

Third round
(South Korea) Kim Dong-moon (South Korea) Ra Kyung-min	15	15
(Malaysia) Chan Chong Ming (Malaysia) Joanne Quay	3	3
(Denmark) Jon Holst-Christensen (Denmark) Ann Jørgensen	15	15
(Netherlands) Quinten van Dalm (Netherlands) Nicole van Hooren	6	7

Quarterfinals
(South Korea) Kim Dong-moon (South Korea) Ra Kyung-min	15	15
(Denmark) Jon Holst-Christensen (Denmark) Ann Jørgensen	1	10

=== Section 2 ===
First round
(China) Liu Yong (China) Ge Fei	15	15
(Sweden) Fredrik Bergström (Sweden) Jenny Karlsson	2	5
(Belarus) Vitali Shmakov (Belarus) Vlada Tcherniavskaia	15	15
(France) Vincent Laigle (France) Amelie Decelle	2	1
(Ukraine) Valerj Strelcov (Ukraine) Natalia Golovkina	15	15
(Japan) Fumihiko Machida (Japan) Haruko Matsuda	3	2
(England) Nathan Robertson (England) Joanne Davies	15	15
(Belgium) Ruud Kuijten (Belgium) Manon Albinus	11	4
(Denmark) Jens Eriksen (Denmark) Mette Schjoldager	15	15
(Mexico) Bernardo Monreal (Mexico) Gabriela Melgoza	0	3
(Canada) Mike Beres (Canada) Kara Solmundson	15	15
(Mauritius) Eddy Clarisse (Mauritius) Selvon Marudamuthu	5	8
(Indonesia) Trikus Haryanto (Indonesia) Minarti Timur	15	15
(Austria) Harald Koch (Hungary) Andrea Dako	7	4
(India) Vincent Lobo (India) Archana Deodhar	15	7	15
(Poland) Piotr Zoladek (Poland) Kamila Augustyn	4	15	4

Second round
(China) Liu Yong (China) Ge Fei	15	15
(Belarus) Vitali Shmakov (Belarus) Vlada Tcherniavskaia	5	7
(Ukraine) Valerj Strelcov (Ukraine) Natalia Golovkina	5	15	15
(England) Nathan Robertson (England) Joanne Davies	15	10	8
(Denmark) Jens Eriksen (Denmark) Mette Schjoldager	15	15
(Canada) Mike Beres (Canada) Kara Solmundson	12	8
(Indonesia) Trikus Haryanto (Indonesia) Minarti Timur	15	15
(India) Vincent Lobo (India) Archana Deodhar	4	4

Third round
(China) Liu Yong (China) Ge Fei	15	15
(Ukraine) Valerj Strelcov (Ukraine) Natalia Golovkina	4	5
(Denmark) Jens Eriksen (Denmark) Mette Schjoldager	15	15
(Indonesia) Trikus Haryanto (Indonesia) Minarti Timur	12	7

Quarterfinals
(China) Liu Yong (China) Ge Fei	15	15
(Denmark) Jens Eriksen (Denmark) Mette Schjoldager	13	5

=== Section 3 ===
First round
(England) Simon Archer (England) Joanne Goode	15	15
(Germany) Joachim Tesche (Germany) Anika Sietz	1	2
(China) Yang Ming (China) Yang Wei	15	15
(Mexico) Luis Lopezllera (Mexico) Veronica Estrada	2	1
(Denmark) Janek Roos (Denmark) Helene Kirkegaard	11	15	15
(Thailand) Kitipon Kitikul (Thailand) Saralee Thungthongkam	15	7	7
(Chinese Taipei) Lee Wei-Jen (Chinese Taipei) Tsai Hui-Min	15	15
(Canada) Brent Olynyk (Canada) Charmaine Reid	10	6
(Indonesia) Bambang Suprianto (Indonesia) Zelin Resiana	15	15
(Spain) José Antonio Crespo (Spain) Dolores Marco	10	4
(Ukraine) Vladislav Druzchenko (Ukraine) Victoria Evtoushenko	15	15
(South Africa) Gavin Polmans (South Africa) Monique Ric-Hansen	6	3
(Netherlands) Chris Bruil (Netherlands) Erica van den Heuvel	15	15
(Hong Kong) Chan Mei Mei (Hong Kong) Yau Tsz Yuk	4	5
(Poland) Robert Mateusiak (Poland) Monika Bienkowska	17	15
(Slovakia) Pavol Mecar (Slovakia) Barbora Bobrovska	15	11

Second round
(England) Simon Archer (England) Joanne Goode	15	15
(China) Yang Ming (China) Yang Wei	7	1
(Denmark) Janek Roos (Denmark) Helene Kirkegaard	15	15
(Chinese Taipei) Lee Wei-Jen (Chinese Taipei) Tsai Hui-Min	7	7
(Indonesia) Bambang Suprianto (Indonesia) Zelin Resiana	15	15
(Ukraine) Vladislav Druzchenko (Ukraine) Victoria Evtoushenko	8	11
(Netherlands) Chris Bruil (Netherlands) Erica van den Heuvel	15	15
(Poland) Robert Mateusiak (Poland) Monika Bienkowska	4	11

Third round
(England) Simon Archer (England) Joanne Goode	15	15
(Denmark) Janek Roos (Denmark) Helene Kirkegaard
(Indonesia) Bambang Suprianto (Indonesia) Zelin Resiana	15	15
(Netherlands) Chris Bruil (Netherlands) Erica van den Heuvel	6	12

Quarterfinals
(England) Simon Archer (England) Joanne Goode	15	15
(Indonesia) Bambang Suprianto (Indonesia) Zelin Resiana	7	9

=== Section 4 ===
First round
(Denmark) Michael Søgaard (Denmark) Rikke Olsen	15	15
(United States) Chris Hales (United States) Yeping Tang	3	1
(Bulgaria) Svetoslav Stoyanov (Bulgaria) Petya Nedeltcheva	15	15
(Bulgaria) Konstantin Dobrev (Bulgaria) Rayna Tzvetkova	1	9
(China) Chen Qiqiu (China) Huang Sui	15	3	15
(Indonesia) Wahyu Pelita Agung (Indonesia) Emma Ermawati	7	15	10
(France) Jean-Michel Lefort (France) Christelle Szynal	15	15
(Mexico) Arturo Amaya (Mexico) Aurora Salazar	0	2
(South Korea) Ha Tae-kwon (South Korea) Chung Jae Hee	15	15
(Chinese Taipei) Chan Ya-Lin (Chinese Taipei) Lee Sung Yuan	5	7
(Austria) Heimo Götschl (Austria) Tina Riedl	15	15
(Mauritius) Stephan Beeharry (Mauritius) Marie-Helene Pierre	10	6
(Germany) Björn Siegemund (Germany) Karen Neumann	15	15
(Peru) Guillermo Cox (Peru) Sandra Jimeno	4	1
(England) Ian Sullivan (England) Gail Emms	15	15
(Portugal) Hugo Rodrigues (Portugal) Ana Ferreira	2	6

Second round
(Denmark) Michael Søgaard (Denmark) Rikke Olsen	15	15
(Bulgaria) Svetoslav Stoyanov (Bulgaria) Petya Nedeltcheva	9	0
(China) Chen Qiqiu (China) Huang Sui	15	15
(France) Jean-Michel Lefort (France) Christelle Szynal	7	4
(South Korea) Ha Tae-kwon (South Korea) Chung Jae Hee	15	15
(Austria) Heimo Götschl (Austria) Tina Riedl	4	2
(Germany) Björn Siegemund (Germany) Karen Neumann	15	13	15
(England) Ian Sullivan (England) Gail Emms	8	15	13

Third round
(Denmark) Michael Søgaard (Denmark) Rikke Olsen	11	15	15
(China) Chen Qiqiu (China) Huang Sui	15	1	5
(South Korea) Ha Tae-kwon (South Korea) Chung Jae Hee	17	15
(Germany) Björn Siegemund (Germany) Karen Neumann	14	13

Quarterfinals
(Denmark) Michael Søgaard (Denmark) Rikke Olsen	15	7	15
(South Korea) Ha Tae-kwon (South Korea) Chung Jae Hee	9	15	7

== Final stage ==
Quarterfinals
1	(South Korea) Kim Dong-moon (South Korea) Ra Kyung-min	15	15
(Denmark) Jon Holst-Christensen (Denmark) Ann Jorgensen	1	10
8	(China) Liu Yong (China) Ge Fei	15	15
(Denmark) Jens Eriksen (Denmark) Mette Schjoldager	13	5
2	(England) Simon Archer (England) Joanne Goode	15	15
(Indonesia) Bambang Suprianto (Indonesia) Zelin Resiana	7	9
3	(Denmark) Michael Søgaard (Denmark) Rikke Olsen	15	7	15
(South Korea) Ha Tae-kwon (South Korea) Chung Jae Hee	9	15	7

Semifinals
1	(South Korea) Kim Dong-moon (South Korea) Ra Kyung-min	15	7	15
8	(China) Liu Yong (China) Ge Fei	7	15	8
2	(England) Simon Archer (England) Joanne Goode	15	15
3	(Denmark) Michael Søgaard (Denmark) Rikke Olsen	5	9

Finals
1	(South Korea) Kim Dong-moon (South Korea) Ra Kyung-min	15	15
2	(England) Simon Archer (England) Joanne Goode	10	13
