= Michael Søgaard =

Danish badminton player (born 1969)

Personal information
- Born: Michael Søgaard; 4 February 1969 (age 57) Sønderborg, Syddanmark, Denmark
- Height: 1.84 m (6 ft 0 in)
- Weight: 74 kg (163 lb)

Sport
- Country: Denmark
- Sport: Badminton
- Handedness: Right
- Event: Men's & mixed doubles

Men's & mixed doubles
- BWF profile
Medal record
Men's badminton
Representing Denmark
World Championships
Bronze medal – third place	1997 Glasgow	Mixed doubles
Bronze medal – third place	1999 Copenhagen	Mixed doubles
Bronze medal – third place	2001 Seville	Mixed doubles
World Cup
Bronze medal – third place	1994 Ho Chi Minh	Men's doubles
Bronze medal – third place	1996 Jakarta	Mixed doubles
Sudirman Cup
Silver medal – second place	1999 Copenhagen	Mixed team
Bronze medal – third place	1993 Birmingham	Mixed team
Bronze medal – third place	1995 Lausanne	Mixed team
Bronze medal – third place	1997 Glasgow	Mixed team
Bronze medal – third place	2001 Seville	Mixed team
Thomas Cup
Silver medal – second place	1996 Hong Kong	Men's team
Bronze medal – third place	1998 Hong Kong	Men's team
Bronze medal – third place	2000 Kuala Lumpur	Men's team
European Championships
Gold medal – first place	1994 Den Bosch	Mixed doubles
Gold medal – first place	1996 Herning	Mixed doubles
Gold medal – first place	1998 Sofia	Mixed doubles
Gold medal – first place	2000 Glasgow	Mixed doubles
Silver medal – second place	1996 Herning	Men's doubles
Bronze medal – third place	1998 Sofia	Men's doubles
Bronze medal – third place	2002 Malmö	Mixed doubles
European Mixed Team Championships
Gold medal – first place	1996 Herning	Mixed team
Gold medal – first place	1998 Sofia	Mixed team
Gold medal – first place	2000 Glasgow	Mixed team
Gold medal – first place	2002 Malmö	Mixed team
Silver medal – second place	1994 Den Bosch	Mixed team
European Junior Championships
Gold medal – first place	1987 Warsaw	Boys' doubles
Gold medal – first place	1987 Warsaw	Mixed team
Silver medal – second place	1987 Warsaw	Boys' singles

Michael Søgaard (born 4 February 1969) is a Danish badminton player.

== Career ==
Søgaard made his debut at the national team in 1992. Since then he has won many tournaments for Denmark. Played for the Kastrup-Magleby BK, he has won ten National Championships titles, three bronze medals at the World Championships, and won the mixed doubles title at the World Grand Prix Finals.

=== Summer Olympics ===
He played badminton at the 1996 Summer Olympics in men's doubles and mixed doubles. In men's doubles, Søgaard and his partner Henrik Svarrer were defeated in the round of 16 by Ricky Subagja and Rexy Mainaky of Indonesia 15-10, 15-7. He also competed in mixed doubles with partner Rikke Olsen. They were defeated in quarterfinals by Chen Xingdong and Peng Xingyong of China 15-10, 6-15, 18-15.

He also competed in badminton at the 2000 Summer Olympics in men's doubles and mixed doubles. In men's doubles, Søgaard and his partner Jim Laugesen were defeated in the round of 16 by Tony Gunawan and Candra Wijaya of Indonesia 15-9, 15-7. He also competed in mixed doubles with partner Rikke Olsen. They reached the semifinals and they were defeated by Zhang Jun and Gao Ling of China 10-15, 15-6, 17-16. They also lost the bronze medal match against Simon Archer and Joanne Goode of Great Britain 15-4, 12-15, 17-14.

=== Titles ===
Søgaard won the European Badminton Championships four consecutive times in mixed doubles. In 1994 with Catrine Bengtsson of Sweden, and in 1996, 1998 and 2000 with Rikke Olsen.

== Achievements ==
=== World Championships ===
Mixed doubles
Year	Venue	Partner	Opponent	Score	Result
1997	Scotstoun Centre, Glasgow, Scotland	(Denmark) Rikke Olsen	(China) Liu Yong (China) Ge Fei	10–15, 9–15	Bronze
1999	Brøndby Arena, Copenhagen, Denmark	(Denmark) Rikke Olsen	(England) Simon Archer (England) Joanne Goode	5–15, 9–15	Bronze
2001	Palacio de Deportes de San Pablo, Seville, Spain	(Denmark) Rikke Olsen	(South Korea) Kim Dong-moon (South Korea) Ra Kyung-min	7–15, 9–15	Bronze

=== World Cup ===
Men's doubles
Year	Venue	Partner	Opponent	Score	Result
1994	Phan Đình Phùng Indoor Stadium, Ho Chi Minh City, Vietnam	(Denmark) Thomas Lund	(Indonesia) Rudy Gunawan (Indonesia) Bambang Suprianto	2–15, 10–15	Bronze

Mixed doubles
Year	Venue	Partner	Opponent	Score	Result
1996	Istora Senayan, Jakarta, Indonesia	(Denmark) Rikke Olsen	(Indonesia) Sandiarto (Indonesia) Minarti Timur	6–15, 15–13, 8–15	Bronze

=== European Championships ===
Men's doubles
Year	Venue	Partner	Opponent	Score	Result
1996	Herning Badminton Klub; Herning, Denmark	(Denmark) Henrik Svarrer	(Denmark) Thomas Lund (Denmark) Jon Holst-Christensen	15–10, 12–15, 17–18	Silver
1998	Winter Sports Palace; Sofia, Bulgaria	(Denmark) Jon Holst-Christensen	(England) Simon Archer (England) Chris Hunt	8–15, 8–15	Bronze

Mixed doubles
Year	Venue	Partner	Opponent	Score	Result
1994	Maaspoort; Den Bosch, Netherlands	(Sweden) Catrine Bengtsson	(Denmark) Christian Jakobsen (Denmark) Lotte Olsen	15–6, 15–9	Gold
1996	Herning Badminton Klub; Herning, Denmark	(Denmark) Rikke Olsen	(England) Simon Archer (England) Julie Bradbury	18–16, 15–2	Gold
1998	Winter Sports Palace; Sofia, Bulgaria	(Denmark) Rikke Olsen	(Germany) Michael Keck (Netherlands) Erica van den Heuvel	15–7, 6–15, 15–11	Gold
2000	Kelvin Hall International Sports Arena; Glasgow, Scotland	(Denmark) Rikke Olsen	(Denmark) Jens Eriksen (Denmark) Mette Schjoldager	15–7, 15–12	Gold
2002	Baltiska hallen Malmö, Sweden	(Denmark) Rikke Olsen	(England) Nathan Robertson (England) Gail Emms	8–6, 2–7, 1–7, 5–7	Bronze

=== European Junior Championships ===
Boys' singles
Year	Venue	Opponent	Score	Result
1987	Hali Mery, Warsaw, Poland	(Finland) Pontus Jäntti	5–15, 9–15	Silver

Boys' doubles
Year	Venue	Partner	Opponent	Score	Result
1987	Hali Mery, Warsaw, Poland	(Denmark) Jens Maibom	(Denmark) Frederik Lindqvist (Denmark) Thomas Olsen	17–15, 13–15, 15–8	Gold

=== IBF World Grand Prix ===
The World Badminton Grand Prix sanctioned by International Badminton Federation (IBF) since 1983.

Men's doubles
Year	Tournament	Partner	Opponent	Score	Result
1997	All England Open	(Denmark) Jon Holst-Christensen	(South Korea) Ha Tae-kwon (South Korea) Kang Kyung-jin	11–15, 16–17	(silver) Runner-up
1997	Russian Open	(Denmark) Jon Holst-Christensen	(Denmark) Jim Laugesen (Denmark) Thomas Stavngaard	15–9, 15–13	(gold) Winner
1997	Denmark Open	(Denmark) Jon Holst-Christensen	(Denmark) Jens Eriksen (Denmark) Jesper Larsen	14–17, 15–8, 18–13	(gold) Winner
1998	Brunei Open	(Indonesia) Denny Kantono	(Indonesia) Tony Gunawan (Indonesia) Halim Haryanto	2–15, 8–15	(silver) Runner-up
1999	Swiss Open	(Denmark) Jim Laugesen	(Denmark) Jens Eriksen (Denmark) Jesper Larsen	15–6, 12–15, 16–17	(silver) Runner-up
1999	Thailand Open	(Denmark) Jim Laugesen	(China) Chen Qiqiu (China) Yu Jinhao	11–15, 13–15	(silver) Runner-up
1999	Denmark Open	(Denmark) Jim Laugesen	(Denmark) Martin Lundgaard Hansen (Denmark) Lars Paaske	13–15, 10–15	(silver) Runner-up
2000	German Open	(Denmark) Jim Laugesen	(Denmark) Michael Lamp (Denmark) Jonas Rasmussen	16–17, 15–10, 15–7	(gold) Winner
2000	Dutch Open	(Denmark) Jim Laugesen	(Indonesia) Sigit Budiarto (Indonesia) Halim Haryanto	11–15, 4–15	(silver) Runner-up
2001	Swiss Open	(Denmark) Jim Laugesen	(Denmark) Jens Eriksen (Denmark) Jesper Larsen	4–7, 7–2, 1–7, 7–1, 7–3	(gold) Winner
2001	German Open	(Denmark) Jim Laugesen	(Denmark) Michael Lamp (Denmark) Jonas Rasmussen	7–1, 7–1, 3–7, 7–4	(gold) Winner
2001	Denmark Open	(Denmark) Jim Laugesen	(Denmark) Martin Lundgaard Hansen (Denmark) Lars Paaske	5–7, 7–3, 8–6, 3–7, 1–7	(silver) Runner-up
2002	German Open	(Denmark) Jim Laugesen	(Denmark) Lars Paaske (Denmark) Jonas Rasmussen	15–10, 9–15, 6–15	(silver) Runner-up

Mixed doubles
Year	Tournament	Partner	Opponent	Score	Result
1993	Malaysia Open	(England) Gillian Gowers	(Indonesia) Paulus Firman (Indonesia) S. Herawati	18–13, 15–13	(gold) Winner
1993	U.S. Open	(England) Gillian Gowers	(Denmark) Thomas Lund (Sweden) Catrine Bengtsson	7–15, 7–15	(silver) Runner-up
1993	German Open	(England) Gillian Gowers	(Denmark) Thomas Lund (Netherlands) Erica van den Heuvel	4–15, 12–15	(silver) Runner-up
1994	Chinese Taipei Open	(England) Gillian Gowers	(Sweden) Peter Axelsson (Denmark) Marlene Thomsen	18–14, 15–10	(gold) Winner
1994	Japan Open	(England) Gillian Gowers	(Denmark) Jon Holst-Christensen (Sweden) Catrine Bengtsson	7–15, 9–15	(silver) Runner-up
1994	Korea Open	(England) Gillian Gowers	(Sweden) Peter Axelsson (Denmark) Marlene Thomsen	15–12, 15–9	(gold) Winner
1994	China Open	(England) Gillian Gowers	(Denmark) Thomas Lund (Denmark) Marlene Thomsen	3–15, 8–15	(silver) Runner-up
1996	Chinese Taipei Open	(Denmark) Rikke Olsen	(China) Liu Jianjun (China) Sun Man	15–3, 7–15, 15–12	(gold) Winner
1996	Malaysia Open	(Denmark) Rikke Olsen	(Indonesia) Tri Kusharjanto (Indonesia) Minarti Timur	7–15, 5–15	(silver) Runner-up
1996	Russian Open	(Denmark) Rikke Olsen	(China) Chen Xingdong (China) Peng Xinyong	15–11, 12–15, 8–15	(silver) Runner-up
1996	Denmark Open	(Denmark) Rikke Olsen	(Denmark) Thomas Stavngaard (Denmark) Ann Jørgensen	15–5, 15–1	(gold) Winner
1996	China Open	(Denmark) Rikke Olsen	(China) Chen Xingdong (China) Peng Xinyong	10–15, 4–15	(silver) Runner-up
1996	Hong Kong Open	(Denmark) Rikke Olsen	(Denmark) Jens Eriksen (Denmark) Marlene Thomsen	15–8, 15–11	(gold) Winner
1996	World Grand Prix Finals	(Denmark) Rikke Olsen	(Indonesia) Tri Kusharjanto (Indonesia) Minarti Timur	15–10, 15–11	(gold) Winner
1997	German Open	(Denmark) Rikke Olsen	(Denmark) Jens Eriksen (Denmark) Marlene Thomsen	11–15, 15–12, 6–15	(silver) Runner-up
1997	Denmark Open	(Denmark) Rikke Olsen	(Denmark) Jens Eriksen (Denmark) Marlene Thomsen	6–15, 14–18	(silver) Runner-up
1997	Thailand Open	(Denmark) Rikke Olsen	(Denmark) Jens Eriksen (Denmark) Marlene Thomsen	15–5, 15–3	(gold) Winner
1998	All England Open	(Denmark) Rikke Olsen	(South Korea) Kim Dong-moon (South Korea) Ra Kyung-min	2–15, 15–11, 5–15	(silver) Runner-up
1998	Swiss Open	(Denmark) Rikke Olsen	(Denmark) Jens Eriksen (Denmark) Marlene Thomsen	13–18, 15–8, 15–3	(gold) Winner
1998	Malaysia Open	(Denmark) Rikke Olsen	(Indonesia) Tri Kusharjanto (Indonesia) Minarti Timur	8–15, 18–15, 15–18	(silver) Runner-up
1998	Brunei Open	(Denmark) Rikke Olsen	(Denmark) Jens Eriksen (Denmark) Marlene Thomsen	13–15, 6–15	(silver) Runner-up
1998	Singapore Open	(Denmark) Rikke Olsen	(Indonesia) Tri Kusharjanto (Indonesia) Minarti Timur	10–15, 8–15	(silver) Runner-up
1998	Denmark Open	(Denmark) Rikke Olsen	(Denmark) Jon Holst-Christensen (Denmark) Ann Jørgensen	6–15, 14–15	(silver) Runner-up
1998	Indonesia Open	(Denmark) Rikke Olsen	(Indonesia) Tri Kusharjanto (Indonesia) Minarti Timur	15–10, 8–15, 8–15	(silver) Runner-up
1998	Hong Kong Open	(Denmark) Rikke Olsen	(England) Simon Archer (England) Joanne Goode	8–15, 15–7, 15–8	(gold) Winner
1999	Swiss Open	(Denmark) Rikke Olsen	(England) Simon Archer (England) Joanne Goode	5–15, 4–15	(silver) Runner-up
1999	Malaysia Open	(Denmark) Rikke Olsen	(Indonesia) Tri Kusharjanto (Indonesia) Minarti Timur	15–4, 15–7	(gold) Winner
1999	Thailand Open	(Denmark) Rikke Olsen	(China) Liu Yong (China) Ge Fei	12–15, 6–15	(silver) Runner-up
1999	Singapore Open	(Denmark) Rikke Olsen	(South Korea) Kim Dong-moon (South Korea) Ra Kyung-min	4–15, 8–15	(silver) Runner-up
2000	Chinese Taipei Open	(Denmark) Rikke Olsen	(Denmark) Jens Eriksen (Denmark) Mette Schjoldager	15–5, 15–9	(gold) Winner
2000	Indonesia Open	(Denmark) Rikke Olsen	(England) Simon Archer (England) Joanne Goode	13–15, 15–11, 4–15	(silver) Runner-up
2000	Denmark Open	(Denmark) Rikke Olsen	(Denmark) Jens Eriksen (Denmark) Mette Schjoldager	15–10, 8–15, 15–10	(gold) Winner
2001	All England Open	(Denmark) Rikke Olsen	(China) Zhang Jun (China) Gao Ling	15–10, 8–15, 9–15	(silver) Runner-up
2001	Swiss Open	(Denmark) Rikke Olsen	(Denmark) Jens Eriksen (Denmark) Mette Schjoldager	4–7, 7–2, 5–7, 2–7	(silver) Runner-up
2001	Singapore Open	(Denmark) Rikke Olsen	(Denmark) Jens Eriksen (Denmark) Mette Schjoldager	2–7, 7–4, 5–7, 5–7	(silver) Runner-up
2001	China Open	(Denmark) Rikke Olsen	(China) Liu Yong (China) Chen Lin	7–4, 7–8, 7–8, 5–7	(silver) Runner-up
2001	German Open	(Denmark) Rikke Olsen	(Denmark) Michael Lamp (Denmark) Ann-Lou Jørgensen	7–1, 7–4, 7–1	(gold) Winner
2002	Korea Open	(Denmark) Rikke Olsen	(South Korea) Kim Dong-moon (South Korea) Ra Kyung-min	1–7, 3–7, 5–7	(silver) Runner-up

=== IBF International ===
Men's singles
Year	Tournament	Opponent	Score	Result
1987	Norwegian International	(Sweden) Stellan Österberg	15–8, 18–17	(gold) Winner
1988	Polish International	(Sweden) Peter Axelsson	10–15, 3–15	(silver) Runner-up
1989	Norwegian International	(Denmark) Thomas Stuer-Lauridsen	15–18, 10–15	(silver) Runner-up

Men's doubles
Year	Tournament	Partner	Opponent	Score	Result
1990	Malta International	(Denmark) Martin Skovgaard	(Austria) Hannes Fuchs (Austria) Jürgen Koch	11–15, 15–4, 15–2	(gold) Winner
1992	Norwegian International	(Denmark) Martin Lundgaard Hansen	(Sweden) Rikard Ronnblom (Sweden) Erik Soderberg	15–6, 15–7	(gold) Winner
1994	Copenhagen Masters	(Denmark) Henrik Svarrer	(Denmark) Jon Holst-Christensen (Denmark) Thomas Lund	10–15, 7–15	(silver) Runner-up
1995	Nordic Championships	(Denmark) Henrik Svarrer	(Sweden) Peter Axelsson (Sweden) Pär-Gunnar Jönsson	15–9, 15–8	(gold) Winner
1995	Copenhagen Masters	(Denmark) Henrik Svarrer	(England) Simon Archer (England) Chris Hunt	15–7, 15–7	(gold) Winner
1997	Nordic Championships	(Denmark) Jon Holst-Christensen	(Denmark) Jens Eriksen (Denmark) Jesper Larsen	walkover	(silver) Runner-up
2000	BMW International	(Denmark) Joachim Fischer Nielsen	(Sweden) Henrik Andersson (Sweden) Fredrik Bergström	15–10, 15–8	(gold) Winner
2001	BMW International	(Denmark) Michael Lamp	(France) Manuel Dubrulle (France) Mihail Popov	7–3, 5–7, 7–4, 7–0	(gold) Winner
2003	Portugal International	(Denmark) Jim Laugesen	(Denmark) Mathias Boe (Denmark) Michael Lamp	15–7, 15–3	(gold) Winner

Mixed doubles
Year	Tournament	Partner	Opponent	Score	Result
1990	Stockholm International	(Denmark) Charlotte Madsen	(Sweden) Jan-Eric Antonsson (Sweden) Charlotta Wihlborg	15–12, 10–15, 8–15	(silver) Runner-up
1995	Nordic Championships	(Denmark) Rikke Olsen	(Denmark) Christian Jakobsen (Denmark) Lotte Olsen	15–10, 15–2	(gold) Winner
