= 1996 World Badminton Grand Prix Finals =

Tournament details
- Dates: 4–8 December
- Edition: 14
- Total prize money: US$350,000
- Location: Denpasar, Bali, Indonesia

The 1996 World Badminton Grand Prix was the 14th edition of the World Badminton Grand Prix finals. It was held in Denpasar, Bali, Indonesia, from December 4 to December 8, 1996. The prize money was US$ 350,000.

== Final results ==
Category	Winners	Runners-up	Score
Men's singles	(Chinese Taipei) Fung Permadi	(China) Sun Jun	15–12, 15–8
Women's singles	(Indonesia) Susi Susanti	(China) Ye Zhaoying	11–4, 11–1
Men's doubles	(Indonesia) Ricky Subagja & Rexy Mainaky	(Malaysia) Cheah Soon Kit & Yap Kim Hock	15–4, 15–9
Women's doubles	(China) Ge Fei & Gu Jun	(Indonesia) Eliza Nathanael & Resiana Zelin	15–4, 15–4
Mixed doubles	(Denmark) Michael Søgaard & Rikke Olsen	(Indonesia) Trikus Heryanto & Minarti Timur	15–10, 15–11

=== Women's Doubles ===
Semifinals
1	(China) Ge Fei (China) Gu Jun	15	10	15
3	(Denmark) Lisbet Stuer-Lauridsen (Denmark) Marlene Thomsen	8	15	7
4	(China) Qin Yiyuan (China) Tang Yongshu	6	11
2	(Indonesia) Eliza Nathanael (Indonesia) Zelin Resiana	15	15

Final
1	(China) Ge Fei (China) Gu Jun	15	15
2	(Indonesia) Eliza Nathanael (Indonesia) Zelin Resiana	4	4

=== Women's singles ===
Semifinals
(Indonesia) Susi Susanti	11	11
(Denmark) Camilla Martin	1	3
(China) Gong Zhichao	8	3
(China) Ye Zhaoying	11	11

Final
(Indonesia) Susi Susanti	11	11
(China) Ye Zhaoying	4	1
