= 1997 All England Open Badminton Championships =

1997 All England Championships
Tournament details
- Dates: 10 March 1997– 15 March 1997
- Edition: 87th
- Location: Birmingham

The 1997 Yonex All England Open was the 87th edition of the All England Open Badminton Championships. It was held from 10 to 15 March 1997, in Birmingham, England.

It was a five-star tournament and the prize money was US$125,000.

== Venue ==
- National Indoor Arena

== Final results ==
Category	Winners	Runners-up	Score
Men's singles	(China) Dong Jiong	(China) Sun Jun	15–9, 15–5
Women's singles	(China) Ye Zhaoying	(China) Gong Zhichao	11–3, 11–1
Men's doubles	(South Korea) Kang Kyung-jin & Ha Tae-kwon	(Denmark) Jon Holst Christensen & Michael Søgaard	15–11, 17–16
Women's doubles	(China) Ge Fei & Gu Jun	(Indonesia) Eliza & Zelin Rosiana	15–6, 15–9
Mixed doubles	(China) Liu Yong & Ge Fei	(Indonesia) Tri Kusharyanto & Minarti Timur	15–10, 15–2

== Men's singles ==
=== Section 1 ===
Round of 32
(China) Dong Jiong	15	15
(Denmark) Kenneth Jonassen	9	1
(Malaysia) Ong Ewe Hock	15	15
(Germany) Oliver Pongratz	5	2
(Denmark) Peter Rasmussen	15	15
(Indonesia) Joko Suprianto	10	3
(Sweden) Thomas Johansson	15	15
(England) Colin Haughton	8	2
(Denmark) Poul-Erik Høyer Larsen	15	15
(China) Xie Yangchun	2	8
(Malaysia) Chen Pang	15	8	15
(South Korea) Hwang Sun Ho	1	15	6
(Indonesia) Budi Santoso	15	15
(Denmark) Thomas Sogaard	5	12
(Denmark) Martin Lundgaard Hansen	11	15	17
(China) Chen Gang	15	11	15

Round of 16
(China) Jiong	3	15	15
(Malaysia) Ong Ewe Hock	15	6	8
(Denmark) Rasmussen	9	15	17
(Sweden) Johansson	15	12	14
(Denmark) Høyer Larsen	15	18
(China) Chen Pang	9	15
(Indonesia) Santoso	15	15
(Denmark) Hansen	2	1

Quarter-finals
(China) Jiong	15	15
(Denmark) Rasmussen	12	8
(Denmark) Høyer Larsen	15	15
(Indonesia) Santoso	7	12

Semi-finals
(China) Jiong	15	15
(Denmark) Høyer Larsen	8	10

=== Section 2 ===
Round of 32
(China) Sun Jun	15	15
(England) Peter Knowles	9	2
(Indonesia) Salim	16	15	18
(Denmark) Anders Boesen	18	12	17
(China) Lin Liwen	15	15
(Malaysia) Hock Kin Yong	12	10
(Indonesia) Indra Wijaya	15	15
(Denmark) Kasper Ødum	5	6
(Indonesia) Hariyanto Arbi	10	15	15
(England) Mark Constable	15	10	9
(Malaysia) Rashid Sidek	15	15
(Canada) Iain Sydie	10	11
(China) Luo Yigang	15	15
(Sweden) Jesper Olsson	8	3
(India) Pullela Gopichand	8	15	18
(Ukraine) Vladislav Druzchenko	15	11	14

Round of 16
(China) Sun Jun	15	15
(Indonesia) Salim	8	2
(China) Liwen	15	15
(Indonesia) Wijaya	5	6
(Indonesia) Arbi	15	15
(Malaysia) Sidek	7	8
(China) Yigang	15	15
(India) Pullela	5	11

Quarter-finals
(China) Sun Jun	15	15
(China) Liwen	9	9
(Indonesia) Arbi	8	15	15
(China) Yigang	15	9	6

Semi-finals
(China) Sun Jun	15	15
(Indonesia) Arbi	10	11

== Women's singles ==
=== Section 1 ===
Round of 32
(China) Ye Zhaoying	11	11
(Denmark) Anne Sondergaard	0	1
(Japan) Kanako Yonekura	11	11
(England) Joanne Muggeridge	7	4
(South Korea) Kim Ji-hyun	11	11
(Japan) Yasuko Mizui	5	7
(China) Yao Yan	11	11
(Denmark) Michelle Rasmussen	0	1
(China) Dai Yun	11	12
(South Korea) Choi Ma-ree	1	10
(Indonesia) Mia Audina	11	11
(Japan) Hisako Mizui	5	1
(China) Zhang Ning	11	11
(South Korea) Lee Soon-deuk	7	1
(Sweden) Marina Andrievskaya	12	11
(Thailand) Pornsawan Plungwech	10	4

Round of 16
(China) Zhaoying	11	11
(Japan) Yonekura	7	0
(South Korea) Ji-hyun	5	11	11
(China) Yao Yan	11	7	8
(China) Dai Yun	6	11	11
(Indonesia) Audina	11	8	5
(China) Zhang Ning	12	11
(Sweden) Andrievskaya	11	5

Quarter-finals
(China) Zhayoing	11	11	12
(South Korea) Ji-hyun	7	1	10
(China) Dai Yun	5	12	11
(China) Zhang Ning	11	11	8

Semi-finals
(China) Zhaoying	11	5	11
(China) Dai Yun	3	11	2

=== Section 2 ===
Round of 32
(China) Gong Zhichao	11	11
(Belarus) Vlada Tcherniavskaia	5	2
(South Korea) Lee Joo-hyun	12	8	12
(Japan) Takako Ida	10	11	9
(Indonesia) Susi Susanti	11	11
(England) Emma Constable	1	1
(South Korea) Park Jin-hyun	11	11
(Taiwan) Hua-Ching Jaw	2	1
(South Korea) Ra Kyung-min	11	11
(Denmark) Mette Sorensen	2	1
(China) Wang Chen	12	11
(Japan) Chikako Nakayama	9	1
(Denmark) Camilla Martin	11	11
(Sweden) Margit Borg	6	5
(China) Han Jingna	11	11
(Wales) Kelly Morgan	4	7

Round of 16
(China) Zhichao	11	11
(South Korea) Joo-hyun	2	3
(Indonesia) Susanti	11	11
(South Korea) Jin-hyun	1	2
(South Korea) Kyung-min	11	11
(China) Wang Chen	4	6
(Denmark) Martin	11	12
(China) Jingna	3	9

Quarter-finals
(China) Zhichao	11	11
(Indonesia) Susanti	4	7
(South Korea) Kyung-min	11	11	11
(Denmark) Martin	7	12	6

Semi-finals
(China) Zhichao	11	11
(South Korea) Kyung-min	3	2
