= Wang Na (synchronized swimmer) =

Chinese synchronized swimmer

Personal information
- Born: 27 January 1984 (age 42) Langzhong, Sichuan, China
- Height: 1.72 m (5 ft 8 in)
- Weight: 58 kg (128 lb)

Sport
- Sport: Swimming
- Strokes: Synchronized swimming
Medal record
Representing China
Women's Synchronized swimming
Olympic Games
Bronze medal – third place	2008 Beijing	Team
World Championships
Silver medal – second place	2009 Rome	Team technical
Bronze medal – third place	2009 Rome	Free combination
Bronze medal – third place	2009 Rome	Team free
Asian Games
Gold medal – first place	2006 Doha	Team

Wang Na (Chinese: 王娜; pinyin: Wáng Nà; born January 27, 1984) is a Chinese former synchronized swimmer who competed in the 2004 Summer Olympics and the 2008 Summer Olympics. She was on the team that won a bronze medal at the 2008 Olympics, which was China's first ever Olympic medal in the sport.

Retired at the age of 25, Wang Na was immediately named one of the two head coaches of the Chinese national team in 2009, becoming the youngest head coach in the team's history. Also hired as a head coach was her former teammate Zhang Xiaohuan, and together the two rookie coaches guided Team China to three golds at the 2010 Asian Games. She left her coaching position in 2011, probably when she was preparing for her pregnancy.

== Personal life ==
Wang Na married badminton player Cai Yun in 2010. She gave birth to a daughter in 2012, and to a second child in probably late 2014. (Before them, Wang Na's teammate Hu Ni and Cai Yun's doubles partner-turned-coach Zhang Jun married in 2006.)
