= 1999 Asian Badminton Championships =

Tournament details
- Dates: 15–19 September
- Venue: Kuala Lumpur Badminton Stadium
- Location: Kuala Lumpur, Malaysia

The 1999 Badminton Asia Championships was the 18th tournament of the Badminton Asia Championships. It was held in Kuala Lumpur, Malaysia.

== Medalists ==
Event	Gold	Silver	Bronze
Men's singles	(China) Chen Hong	(Malaysia) Ong Ewe Hock	(Chinese Taipei) Fung Permadi
Men's singles	(China) Chen Hong	(Malaysia) Ong Ewe Hock	(Indonesia) Marleve Mainaky
Women's singles	(China) Ye Zhaoying	(China) Zhang Ning	(China) Dai Yun
Women's singles	(China) Ye Zhaoying	(China) Zhang Ning	(China) Gong Zhichao
Men's doubles	(South Korea) Ha Tae-kwon (South Korea) Kim Dong-moon	(China) Zhang Jun (China) Zhang Wei	(Malaysia) Cheah Soon Kit (Malaysia) Yap Kim Hock
Men's doubles	(South Korea) Ha Tae-kwon (South Korea) Kim Dong-moon	(China) Zhang Jun (China) Zhang Wei	(Thailand) Tesana Panvisvas (Thailand) Pramote Teerawiwatana
Women's doubles	(China) Ge Fei (China) Gu Jun	(South Korea) Chung Jae-hee (South Korea) Ra Kyung-min	(Thailand) Sujitra Ekmongkolpaisarn (Thailand) Saralee Thungthongkam
Women's doubles	(China) Ge Fei (China) Gu Jun	(South Korea) Chung Jae-hee (South Korea) Ra Kyung-min	(Indonesia) Etty Tantri (Indonesia) Cynthia Tuwankotta
Mixed doubles	(South Korea) Kim Dong-moon (South Korea) Ra Kyung-min	(China) Liu Yong (China) Ge Fei	(Indonesia) Tri Kusharjanto (Indonesia) Zelin Resiana
Mixed doubles	(South Korea) Kim Dong-moon (South Korea) Ra Kyung-min	(China) Liu Yong (China) Ge Fei	(Indonesia) Bambang Suprianto (Indonesia) Minarti Timur

== Medal table ==
Rank	Nation	Gold	Silver	Bronze	Total
1	China (CHN)	3	3	2	8
2	South Korea (KOR)	2	1	0	3
3	Malaysia (MAS)	0	1	1	2
4	Indonesia (INA)	0	0	4	4
5	Thailand (THA)	0	0	2	2
6	Chinese Taipei (TPE)	0	0	1	1
Totals (6 entries)		5	5	10	20

== Final results ==
=== Men's singles ===
Semi-finals
(Chinese Taipei) Fung Permadi	8	15	7
(China) Chen Gang	15	9	15
(Malaysia) Ong Ewe Hock	15	5	15
(Indonesia) Marleve Mainaky	3	15	7

Final
(China) Chen Gang	15	15
(Malaysia) Ong Ewe Hock	11	8

=== Women's singles ===
Semi-finals
(China) Dai Yun	11	3	4
(China) Zhang Ning	9	11	11
(China) Gong Zhichao	2	4
(China) Ye Zhaoying	11	11

Final
(China) Zhang Ning	8	5
(China) Ye Zhaoying	11	11

=== Men's doubles ===
Semi-finals
(South Korea) Ha Tae-kwon (South Korea) Kim Dong-moon	15	15
(Thailand) Tesana Panvisvas (Thailand) Pramote Teerawiwatana	11	7
(Malaysia) Cheah Soon Kit (Malaysia) Yap Kim Hock	16	8
(China) Zhang Jun (China) Zhang Wei	17	15

Final
(South Korea) Ha Tae-kwon (South Korea) Kim Dong-moon	15	15
(China) Zhang Jun (China) Zhang Wei	6	4

=== Women's doubles ===
Semi-finals
(China) Ge Fei (China) Gu Jun	15	15
(Indonesia) Etty Tantri (Indonesia) Cynthia Tuwankotta	7	6
(Thailand) Sujitra Ekmongkolpaisarn (Thailand) Saralee Thungthongkam	1	8
(South Korea) Chung Jae-hee (South Korea) Ra Kyung-min	15	15

Final
(China) Ge Fei (China) Gu Jun	15	15
(South Korea) Chung Jae-hee (South Korea) Ra Kyung-min	8	10

=== Mixed doubles ===
Semi-finals
(Indonesia) Tri Kusharjanto (Indonesia) Zelin Resiana	15	11	6
(South Korea) Kim Dong-moon (South Korea) Ra Kyung-min	13	15	15
(China) Liu Yong (China) Ge Fei	15	15
(Indonesia) Bambang Suprianto (Indonesia) Minarti Timur	2	5

Final
(South Korea) Kim Dong-moon (South Korea) Ra Kyung-min	15	15
(China) Liu Yong (China) Ge Fei	7	13
