= Ge Fei (badminton) =

Chinese badminton player

Ge Fei 葛菲
Personal information
- Born: 9 October 1975 (age 51) Nantong, Jiangsu, China
- Height: 1.71 m (5 ft 7 in)
- Weight: 58 kg (128 lb)
- Spouse: Sun Jun (m. 2002)

Sport
- Country: China
- Sport: Badminton
- Handedness: Right

Women's & mixed doubles
- Highest ranking: 1 (WD with Gu Jun); 1 (XD with Liu Yong)
- BWF profile
Medal record
Women's badminton
Representing China
Olympic Games
Gold medal – first place	2000 Sydney	Women's doubles
Gold medal – first place	1996 Atlanta	Women's doubles
World Championships
Gold medal – first place	1999 Copenhagen	Women's doubles
Gold medal – first place	1997 Glasgow	Women's doubles
Gold medal – first place	1997 Glasgow	Mixed doubles
Bronze medal – third place	1999 Copenhagen	Mixed doubles
Bronze medal – third place	1995 Lausanne	Mixed doubles
World Cup
Gold medal – first place	1997 Yogyakarta	Women's doubles
Gold medal – first place	1997 Yogyakarta	Mixed doubles
Gold medal – first place	1996 Jakarta	Women's doubles
Sudirman Cup
Gold medal – first place	1999 Copenhagen	Mixed team
Gold medal – first place	1997 Glasgow	Mixed team
Gold medal – first place	1995 Lausanne	Mixed team
Uber Cup
Gold medal – first place	2000 Kuala Lumpur	Women's team
Gold medal – first place	1998 Hong Kong	Women's team
Silver medal – second place	1996 Hong Kong	Women's team
Silver medal – second place	1994 Jakarta	Women's team
Asian Games
Gold medal – first place	1998 Bangkok	Women's doubles
Gold medal – first place	1998 Bangkok	Women's team
Bronze medal – third place	1994 Hiroshima	Women's doubles
Bronze medal – third place	1994 Hiroshima	Women's team
Asian Championships
Gold medal – first place	1999 Kuala Lumpur	Women's doubles
Gold medal – first place	1998 Bangkok	Women's doubles
Gold medal – first place	1995 Beijing	Women's doubles
Gold medal – first place	1995 Beijing	Mixed doubles
Gold medal – first place	1994 Shanghai	Women's doubles
Silver medal – second place	1999 Kuala Lumpur	Mixed doubles
Silver medal – second place	1998 Bangkok	Mixed doubles
Asian Cup
Gold medal – first place	1995 Qingdao	Women's doubles
Gold medal – first place	1994 Beijing	Mixed doubles

Ge Fei (Chinese: 葛菲; pinyin: Gě Fēi; born 9 October 1975) is a Chinese former badminton player who is one of the most successful doubles player in the sport's history. Among many international titles, Ge won two Olympic gold medals and two IBF World Championship gold medals in the women's doubles with her regular partner Gu Jun and a World Championship gold medal in the mixed doubles with Liu Yong. Ge was also a member of Chinese teams that captured the Uber Cup (women's world team trophy) in 1998 and 2000. Ge and Gu Jun were the world's dominant women's doubles team from the mid-1990s to their retirement after the 2000 Olympics, winning over thirty top tier international titles together. Ge Fei was elected to the Hall of Fame in 2008.

Alongside Gu Jun, they are the first players to complete the badminton Super Grand Slam. She is married to the former World Champion singles badminton player Sun Jun.

== Olympic Games ==
1996

Ge Fei competed in 1996 Olympics in the women's doubles together with Gu Jun. They won the gold medal beating Gil Young-ah and Jang Hye-ock from Korea 15–5, 15–5 in the final.

2000

Ge also competed in 2000 Olympics in women's doubles with Gu Jun and in mixed doubles together with Liu Yong. In the women's doubles Ge and Gu beat Huang Nanyan and Yang Wei from China 15–5, 15–5 in the final. In mixed doubles she and Liu were upset in round of 16 by Chris Bruil and Erica van den Heuvel from the Netherlands 15–17, 7–15.

== Achievements ==
=== Olympic Games ===
Women's doubles
Year	Venue	Partner	Opponent	Score	Result
1996	GSU Sports Arena, Atlanta, United States	(China) Gu Jun	(South Korea) Gil Young-ah (South Korea) Jang Hye-ock	15–5, 15–5	Gold
2000	The Dome, Sydney, Australia	(China) Gu Jun	(China) Huang Nanyan (China) Yang Wei	15–5, 15–5	Gold

=== World Championships ===
Women's doubles
Year	Venue	Partner	Opponent	Score	Result
1997	Scotstoun Centre, Glasgow, Scotland	(China) Gu Jun	(China) Qin Yiyuan (China) Tang Yongshu	15–1, 15–7	Gold
1999	Brøndby Arena, Copenhagen, Denmark	(China) Gu Jun	(South Korea) Chung Jae-hee (South Korea) Ra Kyung-min	15–4, 15–5	Gold

Mixed doubles
Year	Venue	Partner	Opponent	Score	Result
1995	Malley Sports Centre, Lausanne, Switzerland	(China) Liu Jianjun	(Denmark) Jens Eriksen (Denmark) Helene Kirkegaard	5–15, 3–15	Bronze
1997	Scotstoun Centre, Glasgow, Scotland	(China) Liu Yong	(Denmark) Jens Eriksen (Denmark) Marlene Thomsen	15–5, 16–17, 15–4	Gold
1999	Brøndby Arena, Copenhagen, Denmark	(China) Liu Yong	(South Korea) Kim Dong-moon (South Korea) Ra Kyung-min	7–15, 15–7, 8–15	Bronze

=== World Cup ===
Women's doubles
Year	Venue	Partner	Opponent	Score	Result
1996	Istora Senayan, Jakarta, Indonesia	(China) Gu Jun	(China) Qin Yiyuan (China) Tang Yongshu	15–6, 15–12	Gold
1997	Among Rogo Sports Hall, Yogyakarta, Indonesia	(China) Gu Jun	(China) Qin Yiyuan (China) Tang Yongshu	15–10, 9–15, 15–9	Gold

Mixed doubles
Year	Venue	Partner	Opponent	Score	Result
1997	Among Rogo Sports Hall, Yogyakarta, Indonesia	(China) Liu Yong	(Indonesia) Tri Kusharjanto (Indonesia) Minarti Timur	12–15, 15–7, 15–10	Gold

=== Asian Games ===
Women's doubles
Year	Venue	Partner	Opponent	Score	Result
1994	Tsuru Memorial Gymnasium, Hiroshima, Japan	(China) Gu Jun	(South Korea) Chung So-young (South Korea) Gil Young-ah	15–9, 7–15, 10–15	Bronze
1998	Thammasat Gymnasium 2, Bangkok, Thailand	(China) Gu Jun	(Indonesia) Deyana Lomban (Indonesia) Eliza Nathanael	12–15, 15–9, 15–11	Gold

=== Asian Championships ===
Women's doubles
Year	Venue	Partner	Opponent	Score	Result
1994	Shanghai Gymnasium, Shanghai, China	(China) Gu Jun	(China) Chen Ying (China) Wu Yuhong	15–11, 18–14	Gold
1995	Olympic Sports Center Gymnasium, Beijing, China	(China) Gu Jun	(China) Qin Yiyuan (China) Tang Yongshu	15–1, 15–4	Gold
1998	Nimibutr Stadium, Bangkok, Thailand	(China) Gu Jun	(China) Qin Yiyuan (China) Tang Yongshu	15–8, 15–7	Gold
1999	Kuala Lumpur Badminton Stadium, Kuala Lumpur, Malaysia	(China) Gu Jun	(South Korea) Chung Jae-hee (South Korea) Ra Kyung-min	15–8, 15–10	Gold

Mixed doubles
Year	Venue	Partner	Opponent	Score	Result
1995	Olympic Sports Center Gymnasium, Beijing, China	(China) Liu Jianjun	(China) Jiang Xin (China) Zhang Jin	15–4, 12–15, 15–5	Gold
1998	Nimibutr Stadium, Bangkok, Thailand	(China) Sun Jun	(South Korea) Kim Dong-moon (South Korea) Ra Kyung-min	7–15, 8–15	Silver
1999	Kuala Lumpur Badminton Stadium, Kuala Lumpur, Malaysia	(China) Liu Yong	(South Korea) Kim Dong-moon (South Korea) Ra Kyung-min	7–15, 13–15	Silver

=== Asian Cup ===
Women's doubles
Year	Venue	Partner	Opponent	Score	Result
1995	Xinxing Gymnasium, Qingdao, China	(China) Gu Jun	(South Korea) Gil Young-ah (South Korea) Jang Hye-ock	15–7, 18–17	Gold

Mixed doubles
Year	Venue	Partner	Opponent	Score	Result
1994	Beijing Gymnasium, Beijing, China	(China) Liu Jianjun	(Indonesia) Aryono Miranat (Indonesia) Eliza Nathanael	15–4, 13–15, 15–10	Gold

=== World Junior Championships ===
The Bimantara World Junior Championships was an international invitation badminton tournament for junior players. It was held in Jakarta, Indonesia from 1987 to 1991.

Girls' doubles
Year	Venue	Partner	Opponent	Score	Result
1990	Istora Senayan, Jakarta, Indonesia	(China) Peng Xinyong	(China) Liu Hong (China) Ye Zhaoying		Silver

=== IBF World Grand Prix (46 titles, 11 runners-up) ===
The World Badminton Grand Prix sanctioned by International Badminton Federation (IBF) from 1983 to 2006.

Women's doubles
Year	Tournament	Partner	Opponent	Score	Result
1993	Thailand Open	(China) Gu Jun	(China) Han Jingna (China) Li Qi	15–5, 15–10	(gold) Winner
1994	Malaysia Open	(China) Gu Jun	(Indonesia) Eliza Nathanael (Indonesia) Zelin Resiana	15–5, 15–11	(gold) Winner
1994	Singapore Open	(China) Gu Jun	(South Korea) Gil Young-ah (South Korea) Kim Mee-hyang	15–7, 18–16	(gold) Winner
1994	Thailand Open	(China) Gu Jun	(England) Julie Bradbury (England) Joanne Goode	15–12, 15–4	(gold) Winner
1994	Hong Kong Open	(China) Gu Jun	(South Korea) Jang Hye-ock (South Korea) Shim Eun-jung	11–15, 14–18	(silver) Runner-up
1994	China Open	(China) Gu Jun	(South Korea) Bang Soo-hyun (South Korea) Jang Hye-ock	15–8, 15–2	(gold) Winner
1994	World Grand Prix Finals	(China) Gu Jun	(Indonesia) Finarsih (Indonesia) Lili Tampi	13–15, 15–8, 15–7	(gold) Winner
1995	Korea Open	(China) Gu Jun	(South Korea) Gil Young-ah (South Korea) Jang Hye-ock	13–15, 15–1, 11–15	(silver) Runner-up
1995	Japan Open	(China) Gu Jun	(Indonesia) Finarsih (Indonesia) Lili Tampi	15–11, 15–8	(gold) Winner
1995	Indonesia Open	(China) Gu Jun	(China) Qin Yiyuan (China) Tang Yongshu	15–6, 15–6	(gold) Winner
1995	Singapore Open	(China) Gu Jun	(South Korea) Gil Young-ah (South Korea) Jang Hye-ock	15–12, 15–7	(gold) Winner
1995	Thailand Open	(China) Gu Jun	(South Korea) Gil Young-ah (South Korea) Jang Hye-ock	17–18, 6–15	(silver) Runner-up
1995	China Open	(China) Gu Jun	(South Korea) Gil Young-ah (South Korea) Jang Hye-ock	15–12, 10–15, 15–3	(gold) Winner
1995	World Grand Prix Finals	(China) Gu Jun	(South Korea) Gil Young-ah (South Korea) Jang Hye-ock	15–7, 15–12	(gold) Winner
1996	Chinese Taipei Open	(China) Gu Jun	(South Korea) Kim Mee-hyang (South Korea) Kim Shin-young	15–8, 15–13	(gold) Winner
1996	Japan Open	(China) Gu Jun	(South Korea) Gil Young-ah (South Korea) Jang Hye-ock	5–15, 17–14, 10–15	(silver) Runner-up
1996	All England Open	(China) Gu Jun	(Denmark) Helene Kirkegaard (Denmark) Rikke Olsen	15–3, 15–7	(gold) Winner
1996	World Grand Prix Finals	(China) Gu Jun	(Indonesia) Eliza Nathanael (Indonesia) Zelin Resiana	15–4, 15–4	(gold) Winner
1997	Japan Open	(China) Gu Jun	(Indonesia) Eliza Nathanael (Indonesia) Zelin Resiana	12–15, 15–12, 15–1	(gold) Winner
1997	Korea Open	(China) Gu Jun	(China) Qin Yiyuan (China) Tang Yongshu	15–10, 15–10	(gold) Winner
1997	All England Open	(China) Gu Jun	(Indonesia) Eliza Nathanael (Indonesia) Zelin Resiana	15–6, 15–9	(gold) Winner
1997	Swiss Open	(China) Gu Jun	(China) Han Jingna (China) Ye Zhaoying	9–15, 15–2, 15–11	(gold) Winner
1997	Malaysia Open	(China) Gu Jun	(China) Liu Lu (China) Qian Hong	15–7, 15–1	(gold) Winner
1997	Singapore Open	(China) Gu Jun	(Indonesia) Indarti Issolina (Indonesia) Deyana Lomban	15–4, 15–9	(gold) Winner
1997	China Open	(China) Gu Jun	(China) Qin Yiyuan (China) Tang Yongshu	15–13, 15–11	(gold) Winner
1997	World Grand Prix Finals	(China) Gu Jun	(China) Qin Yiyuan (China) Tang Yongshu	15–1, 15–8	(gold) Winner
1998	Japan Open	(China) Gu Jun	(China) Qin Yiyuan (China) Tang Yongshu	Walkover	(gold) Winner
1998	All England Open	(China) Gu Jun	(South Korea) Jang Hye-ock (South Korea) Ra Kyung-min	15–7, 15–7	(gold) Winner
1998	Swiss Open	(China) Gu Jun	(Denmark) Rikke Olsen (Denmark) Marlene Thomsen	15–7, 15–4	(gold) Winner
1998	Singapore Open	(China) Gu Jun	(China) Qin Yiyuan (China) Tang Yongshu	15–8, 15–13	(gold) Winner
1998	World Grand Prix Finals	(China) Gu Jun	(Denmark) Rikke Olsen (Denmark) Marlene Thomsen	Walkover	(gold) Winner
1999	Korea Open	(China) Zhang Ning	(China) Huang Nanyan (China) Yang Wei	10–15, 1–15	(silver) Runner-up
1999	Japan Open	(China) Gu Jun	(China) Huang Nanyan (China) Yang Wei	12–15, 17–16, 15–5	(gold) Winner
1999	Malaysia Open	(China) Gu Jun	(China) Gao Ling (China) Qin Yiyuan	15–8, 15–10	(gold) Winner
1999	China Open	(China) Gu Jun	(China) Gao Ling (China) Qin Yiyuan	15–5, 15–6	(gold) Winner
1999	World Grand Prix Finals	(China) Gu Jun	(South Korea) Chung Jae-hee (South Korea) Ra Kyung-min	15–2, 15–4	(gold) Winner
2000	All England Open	(China) Gu Jun	(South Korea) Chung Jae-hee (South Korea) Ra Kyung-min	15–5, 15–3	(gold) Winner
2000	Japan Open	(China) Gu Jun	(China) Huang Nanyan (China) Yang Wei	15–13, 4–15, 11–15	(silver) Runner-up
2000	Thailand Open	(China) Gu Jun	(China) Huang Nanyan (China) Yang Wei	15–8, 15–11	(gold) Winner
2000	Malaysia Open	(China) Gu Jun	(China) Huang Nanyan (China) Yang Wei	15–17, 15–6, 15–8	(gold) Winner

Mixed doubles
Year	Tournament	Partner	Opponent	Score	Result
1994	Malaysia Open	(China) Liu Jianjun	(Sweden) Jan-Eric Antonsson (Sweden) Astrid Crabo	9–15, 11–15	(silver) Runner-up
1995	Korea Open	(China) Liu Jianjun	(Denmark) Thomas Lund (Denmark) Marlene Thomsen	4–15, 15–18	(silver) Runner-up
1997	Japan Open	(China) Liu Yong	(Denmark) Jens Eriksen (Denmark) Marlene Thomsen	15–8, 15–10	(gold) Winner
1997	Korea Open	(China) Liu Yong	(Denmark) Jens Eriksen (Denmark) Marlene Thomsen	15–13, 15–5	(gold) Winner
1997	All England Open	(China) Liu Yong	(Indonesia) Tri Kusharjanto (Indonesia) Minarti Timur	15–10, 15–2	(gold) Winner
1997	Swiss Open	(China) Liu Yong	(Indonesia) Flandy Limpele (Indonesia) Minarti Timur	15–9, 15–9	(gold) Winner
1997	Malaysia Open	(China) Liu Yong	(Denmark) Jens Eriksen (Denmark) Marlene Thomsen	15–12, 15–12	(gold) Winner
1997	China Open	(China) Liu Yong	(South Korea) Kim Dong-moon (South Korea) Ra Kyung-min	10–15, 6–15	(silver) Runner-up
1997	World Grand Prix Finals	(China) Liu Yong	(Indonesia) Tri Kusharjanto (Indonesia) Minarti Timur	15–9, 15–13	(gold) Winner
1999	Korea Open	(China) Liu Yong	(South Korea) Kim Dong-moon (South Korea) Ra Kyung-min	6–15, 8–15	(silver) Runner-up
1999	Chinese Taipei Open	(China) Liu Yong	(Indonesia) Bambang Suprianto (Indonesia) Zelin Resiana	15–12, 15–10	(gold) Winner
1999	Japan Open	(China) Liu Yong	(South Korea) Ha Tae-kwon (South Korea) Chung Jae-hee	15–1, 15–3	(gold) Winner
1999	Thailand Open	(China) Liu Yong	(Denmark) Michael Sogaard (Denmark) Rikke Olsen	15–12, 15–6	(gold) Winner
1999	Denmark Open	(China) Liu Yong	(China) Zhang Jun (China) Gao Ling	15–12, 17–14	(gold) Winner
1999	China Open	(China) Liu Yong	(China) Zhang Jun (China) Gao Ling	15–8, 15–5	(gold) Winner
2000	All England Open	(China) Liu Yong	(South Korea) Kim Dong-moon (South Korea) Ra Kyung-min	10–15, 2–15	(silver) Runner-up
2000	Japan Open	(China) Liu Yong	(Indonesia) Tri Kusharjanto (Indonesia) Minarti Timur	15–5, 17–14	(gold) Winner

=== IBF International (4 titles) ===
Women's singles
Year	Tournament	Opponent	Score	Result
1993	Wimbledon International	(China) Gu Jun	11–4, 11–6	(gold) Winner

Women's doubles
Year	Tournament	Partner	Opponent	Score	Result
1993	Wimbledon International	(China) Gu Jun	(Netherlands) Erica van den Heuvel (Netherlands) Nicole van Hooren	15–5, 15–6	(gold) Winner
2001	Singapore International	(China) Qian Hong	(China) Gao Qian (China) Huang Lipei	15–3, 15–3	(gold) Winner

Mixed doubles
Year	Tournament	Partner	Opponent	Score	Result
2001	Singapore International	(China) Sun Jun	(China) Shen Long (China) Gao Qian	15–7, 15–11	(gold) Winner

== Performance timeline ==
Key

W	Won	F	Finalist	SF	Semi-finalist
QF	Quarter-finalist	#R	Rounds 4, 3, 2, 1	RR	Round-robin stage
Q#	Qualification round	A	Absent	w/d	Withdrew
G	Gold	S	Silver	B	Bronze
NH	Not held	N/A	Not applicable	DNQ	Did not qualify

=== National team ===
- Senior level

Team events	1994	1995	1996	1997	1998	1999	2000
Uber Cup	S	NH	S	NH	G	NH	G
Sudirman Cup	NH	G	NH	G	NH	G	NH
Asian Games	B	NH			G	NH	

=== Individual competitions ===
==== Junior level ====
- Girls' doubles

Events	1990
World Jr Invitational Championships	S

==== Senior level ====
- Women's singles

Tournaments	1992	1993	1994
All England Open	A		1R
China Open	1R	1R	A
Thailand Open	A	1R	A
Wimbledon Open	A	W	A

- Women's doubles

Tournaments	1994	1995	1996	1997	1998	1999	2000
Olympic Games	NH		G	NH			G
World Championships	NH	QF	NH	G	NH	G	NH
World Cup			G	G	NH		
Asian Games	B	NH			G	NH	
Asian Championships	G	G	A		G	G	A
Asian Cup		G		NH			

Tournaments	1991	1992	1993	1994	1995	1996	1997	1998	1999	2000	2001
Year-end finals				W	W	W	W	W	W	A	NH
China Open	2R	2R	QF	W	W	A	W	NH	W	NH	A
Japan Open	A				W	F	W	W	W	F	A
All England Open	A			2R	A	W	W	W	wd	W	A
Malaysia Open	A			W	A		W	A	W	W	A
Singapore Open	A		NH	W	W	NH	W	W	A	NH	A
Thailand Open	A		W	W	F	A		NH	A	W	A
Korea Open	A				F	A	W	NH	F	A	
Swiss Open	A						W	W	A		
Chinese Taipei Open	A					W	A	NH	wd	A	
Hong Kong Open	A			F	A					NH	A
Indonesia Open	A				W	A					
US Open	A				SF	A					
Singapore International	NH								A	NH	W
Wimbledon Open	A		W	A		NH					

- Mixed doubles

Tournaments	1994	1995	1996	1997	1998	1999	2000
Olympic Games	NH		A	NH			2R
World Championships	NH	B	NH	G	NH	B	NH
World Cup				G	NH		
Asian Games	QF	NH			QF	NH	
Asian Championships	QF	G	A		S	S	A
Asian Cup	G	A		NH			

Tournaments	1992	1993	1994	1995	1996	1997	1998	1999	2000	2001
Year-end finals					A	W	A	SF	A	NH
China Open	2R	QF	3R	A		F	NH	W	NH	A
Japan Open	A			QF	A	W	A	W	W	A
All England Open	A					W	QF	A	F	A
Korea Open	A			F	A	W	NH	F	A	
Malaysia Open	A		F	A		W	A		SF	A
Thailand Open	A	2R	A				NH	W	SF	A
Singapore Open	A	NH	3R	A	NH	A	2R	A	NH	A
Chinese Taipei Open	A						NH	W	A	NH
Denmark Open	A							W	A	
Swiss Open	A					W	A			
Singapore International	NH							A	NH	W
Wimbledon Open	A	QF	A		NH					

== Sources ==
- "GE Fei at InternationalBadminton.org". Archived from the original on 2007-09-29.
- Ge Fei at Olympics at Sports-Reference.com (archived)
