= Liu Yong (badminton) =

Chinese badminton player (born 1975)

Liu Yong 刘永
Personal information
- Born: 12 August 1975 (age 51) Nanjing, Jiangsu, China
- Height: 1.83 m (6 ft 0 in)
- Weight: 68 kg (150 lb)
- Spouse: Dai Yun (m. 2004)

Sport
- Country: China
- Sport: Badminton
- Handedness: Right

Men's & mixed doubles
- Highest ranking: 1 (XD with Ge Fei)
- BWF profile
Medal record
Men's badminton
Representing China
World Championships
Gold medal – first place	1997 Glasgow	Mixed doubles
Bronze medal – third place	1999 Copenhagen	Mixed doubles
World Cup
Gold medal – first place	1997 Yogyakarta	Mixed doubles
Sudirman Cup
Gold medal – first place	2001 Seville	Mixed team
Gold medal – first place	1999 Copenhagen	Mixed team
Gold medal – first place	1997 Glasgow	Mixed team
Thomas Cup
Silver medal – second place	2000 Kuala Lumpur	Men's team
Bronze medal – third place	1998 Hong Kong	Men's team
Bronze medal – third place	1996 Hong Kong	Men's team
Asian Games
Silver medal – second place	1998 Bangkok	Men's team
Bronze medal – third place	2002 Busan	Men's team
Bronze medal – third place	1998 Bangkok	Men's doubles
Asian Championships
Silver medal – second place	1999 Kuala Lumpur	Mixed doubles
Asian Cup
Bronze medal – third place	1996 Seoul	Men's doubles
Bronze medal – third place	1996 Seoul	Mixed doubles
World Junior Championships
Bronze medal – third place	1992 Jakarta	Boys' doubles

Liu Yong (simplified Chinese: 刘永; traditional Chinese: 劉永; pinyin: Liú Yǒng; born 12 August 1975) is a former international level badminton player for China who specialized in mixed doubles.

He is married to former singles player on the Chinese national badminton team Dai Yun.

== Career ==
Liu Yong started badminton training when he was 8, and was taken into the Chinese National Team in 1993. He won numerous international titles in mixed doubles, the majority of them with Ge Fei. He won men's doubles at the 2002 Malaysia Open with Chen Qiqiu. In 2004, he joined the Unisys in Japan as a player and coach for the team.

=== World Championships ===
Liu won the 1997 IBF World Championships in mixed doubles, with Ge Fei, beating Jens Eriksen and Marlene Thomsen in the final. They also won a bronze medal at the 1999 IBF World Championships. In the next edition in 2001, Liu reached the mixed doubles quarterfinals with Cheng Jiao but lost to Michael Søgaard and Rikke Olsen.

=== Summer Olympics ===
Liu Yong competed in badminton at the 2000 Summer Olympics in mixed doubles with Ge Fei. In the first round they had a bye, and in the second round they were defeated by Chris Bruil and Erica van den Heuvel, from the Netherlands.

== Achievements ==
=== World Championships ===
Mixed doubles
Year	Venue	Partner	Opponent	Score	Result
1999	Brøndby Arena, Copenhagen, Denmark	(China) Ge Fei	(South Korea) Kim Dong-moon (South Korea) Ra Kyung-min	7–15, 15–7, 8–15	Bronze
1997	Scotstoun Centre, Glasgow, Scotland	(China) Ge Fei	(Denmark) Jens Eriksen (Denmark) Marlene Thomsen	15–5, 16–17, 15–4	Gold

=== World Cup ===
Mixed doubles
Year	Venue	Partner	Opponent	Score	Result
1997	Yogyakarta, Indonesia	(China) Ge Fei	(Indonesia) Tri Kusharyanto (Indonesia) Minarti Timur	12–15, 15–7, 15–10	Gold

=== Asian Games ===
Men's doubles
Year	Venue	Partner	Opponent	Score	Result
1998	Thammasat Gymnasium 2 Bangkok, Thailand	(China) Yu Jinhao	(Indonesia) Ricky Subagja (Indonesia) Rexy Mainaky	10–15, 11–15	Bronze

=== Asian Championships ===
Mixed doubles
Year	Venue	Partner	Opponent	Score	Result
1999	Kuala Lumpur, Malaysia	(China) Ge Fei	(South Korea) Kim Dong-moon (South Korea) Ra Kyung-min	7–15, 13–15	Silver

=== Asian Cup ===
Men's doubles
Year	Venue	Partner	Opponent	Score	Result
1996	Olympic Gymnasium No. 2 Seoul, South Korea	(China) Zhang Wei	(Indonesia) Rudy Wijaya (Indonesia) Tony Gunawan	9–15, 6–15	Bronze

Mixed doubles
Year	Venue	Partner	Opponent	Score	Result
1996	Olympic Gymnasium No. 2 Seoul, South Korea	(China) Gao Jian	(South Korea) Park Joo-bong (South Korea) Ra Kyung-min	5–15, 4–15	Bronze

=== World Junior Championships ===
Boys' doubles
Year	Venue	Partner	Opponent	Score	Result
1992	Istora Senayan; Jakarta, Indonesia	(China) Yu Jinhao	(Indonesia) Kusno (Indonesia) Amon Santoso		Bronze

=== IBF World Grand Prix ===
The World Badminton Grand Prix sanctioned by International Badminton Federation (IBF) since 1983.

Men's doubles
Year	Tournament	Partner	Opponent	Score	Result
2002	Malaysia Open	(China) Chen Qiqiu	(Malaysia) Chang Kim Wai (Malaysia) Choong Tan Fook	17–14, 15–3	(gold) Winner
2001	China Open	(China) Chen Qiqiu	(China) Zhang Wei (China) Zhang Jun	1–7, 7–4, 6–8, 7–4, 5–7	(silver) Runner-up
1998	Malaysia Open	(China) Yu Jinhao	(Indonesia) Tony Gunawan (Indonesia) Halim Haryanto	15–6, 5–15, 11–15	(silver) Runner-up
1998	Swiss Open	(China) Yu Jinhao	(China) Zhang Wei (China) Zhang Jun	15–17, 7–15	(silver) Runner-up
1997	China Open	(China) Zhang Wei	(China) Ge Cheng (China) Tao Xiaoqiang	3–15, 7–15	(silver) Runner-up
1997	U.S. Open	(China) Zhang Wei	(South Korea) Kim Dong-moon (South Korea) Ha Tae-kwon	3–15, 15–6, 12–15	(silver) Runner-up
1996	Vietnam Open	(China) Zhang Wei	(Malaysia) Choong Tan Fook (Malaysia) Lee Wan Wah	6–15, 6–15	(silver) Runner-up
1996	Dutch Open	(China) Zhang Wei	(China) Ge Cheng (China) Tao Xiaoqiang	8–11, 11–9, 4–9, 9–7, 3–9	(silver) Runner-up

Mixed doubles
Year	Tournament	Partner	Opponent	Score	Result
2001	China Open	(China) Chen Lin	(Denmark) Michael Søgaard (Denmark) Rikke Olsen	4–7, 8–7, 8–7, 7–5	(gold) Winner
2001	Malaysia Open	(China) Zhang Jiewen	(Indonesia) Bambang Suprianto (Indonesia) Emma Ermawati	8–7, 8–6, 2–7, 2–7, 2–7	(silver) Runner-up
2001	Japan Open	(China) Cheng Jiao	(Indonesia) Bambang Suprianto (Indonesia) Minarti Timur	6–15, 17–14, 5–15	(silver) Runner-up
2000	Japan Open	(China) Ge Fei	(Indonesia) Tri Kusharjanto (Indonesia) Minarti Timur	15–5, 17–14	(gold) Winner
2000	All England Open	(China) Ge Fei	(South Korea) Kim Dong-moon (South Korea) Ra Kyung-min	10–15, 2–15	(silver) Runner-up
1999	China Open	(China) Ge Fei	(China) Zhang Jun (China) Gao Ling	15–8, 15–5	(gold) Winner
1999	Denmark Open	(China) Ge Fei	(China) Zhang Jun (China) Gao Ling	15–12, 17–14	(gold) Winner
1999	Thailand Open	(China) Ge Fei	(Denmark) Michael Sogaard (Denmark) Rikke Olsen	15–12, 15–6	(gold) Winner
1999	Japan Open	(China) Ge Fei	(South Korea) Ha Tae-kwon (South Korea) Chung Jae-hee	15–1, 15–3	(gold) Winner
1999	Chinese Taipei Open	(China) Ge Fei	(Indonesia) Bambang Suprianto (Indonesia) Zelin Resiana	15–12, 15–10	(gold) Winner
1999	Korea Open	(China) Ge Fei	(South Korea) Kim Dong-moon (South Korea) Ra Kyung-min	6–15, 8–15	(silver) Runner-up
1997	Grand Prix Finals	(China) Ge Fei	(Indonesia) Tri Kusharjanto (Indonesia) Minarti Timur	15–9, 15–13	(gold) Winner
1997	China Open	(China) Ge Fei	(South Korea) Kim Dong-moon (South Korea) Ra Kyung-min	10–15, 6–15	(silver) Runner-up
1997	Malaysia Open	(China) Ge Fei	(Denmark) Jens Eriksen (Denmark) Marlene Thomsen	15–12, 15–12	(gold) Winner
1997	Swiss Open	(China) Ge Fei	(Indonesia) Flandy Limpele (Indonesia) Minarti Timur	15–9, 15–9	(gold) Winner
1997	All England Open	(China) Ge Fei	(Indonesia) Tri Kusharjanto (Indonesia) Minarti Timur	15–10, 15–2	(gold) Winner
1997	Korea Open	(China) Ge Fei	(Denmark) Jens Eriksen (Denmark) Marlene Thomsen	15–13, 15–5	(gold) Winner
1997	Japan Open	(China) Ge Fei	(Denmark) Jens Eriksen (Denmark) Marlene Thomsen	15–8, 15–10	(gold) Winner
1996	Vietnam Open	(China) Zhang Jin	(Indonesia) Sandiarto (Indonesia) Finarsih	15–9, 18–15	(gold) Winner
1994	Russian Open	(China) Li Qi	(Ukraine) Vladislav Druzchenko (Ukraine) Viktoria Evtushenko	15–12, 18–13	(gold) Winner
