= 1997 Indonesia Open (badminton) =

Tournament details
- Dates: 16–20 July
- Edition: 16th
- Total prize money: US$200,000
- Location: Surakarta, Indonesia

Champions
- Men's singles: (Indonesia) Ardy Wiranata
- Women's singles: (Indonesia) Susi Susanti
- Men's doubles: (Indonesia) Candra Wijaya (Indonesia) Sigit Budiarto
- Women's doubles: (Indonesia) Zelin Rosiana (Indonesia) Eliza Nathanael
- Mixed doubles: (Indonesia) Tri Kusharjanto (Indonesia) Minarti Timur

The 1997 Indonesia Open in badminton was held in Surakarta, from July 16 to July 20, 1997. It was a five-star tournament and the prize money was US$200,000.

== Final results ==
| Category | Winners | Runners-up | Score |
|---|---|---|---|
| Men's Singles | (Indonesia) Ardy Wiranata | (Indonesia) Marleve Mainaky | 15–9, 15–3 |
| Women's singles | (Indonesia) Susi Susanti | (Indonesia) Meiluawati | 11–4, 11–5 |
| Men's doubles | (Indonesia) Candra Wijaya & Sigit Budiarto | (South Korea) Yoo Yong-sung & Lee Dong-soo | 15–9, 15–10 |
| Women's doubles | (Indonesia) Zelin Rosiana & Eliza Nathanael | (Indonesia) Finarsih & Minarti Timur | 15–10, 15–5 |
| Mixed doubles | (Indonesia) Tri Kusharjanto & Minarti Timur | (Indonesia) Bambang Suprianto & Riseu Rosalina | 15–11, 15–6 |

| Preceded by 1996 Indonesia Open | Indonesia Open | Succeeded by 1998 Indonesia Open |
