= Hu Ni =

Chinese synchronized swimmer (born 1981)

Personal information
- National team: China
- Born: 9 February 1981 (age 45) Taiyuan, Shanxi, China
- Height: 1.70 m (5 ft 7 in)
- Weight: 52 kg (115 lb)

Sport
- Sport: Swimming
- Strokes: Synchronized swimming

Hu Ni (Chinese: 胡妮, born 9 February 1981) is a Chinese synchronized swimmer who competed in the 2004 Summer Olympics.

== Personal life ==
Hu Ni married badminton player Zhang Jun in 2006. Their son was born in 2009. (Hu Ni's teammate Wang Na married Zhang Jun's former doubles partner Cai Yun, whom Zhang later also coached, in 2010.)
