= Yu Jinhao =

Chinese badminton player

Yu Jinhao 余锦豪
Personal information
- Born: 12 November 1975 (age 50) Guangzhou, Guangdong, China
- Height: 1.70 m (5 ft 7 in)
- Weight: 65 kg (143 lb)

Sport
- Country: China
- Sport: Badminton
- Handedness: Right

Men's doubles
- Highest ranking: 5 (January 1999)
- BWF profile
Medal record
Men's badminton
Representing China
Sudirman Cup
Gold medal – first place	1999 Copenhagen	Mixed team
Thomas Cup
Silver medal – second place	2000 Kuala Lumpur	Men's team
Bronze medal – third place	1998 Hong Kong	Men's team
Asian Games
Silver medal – second place	1998 Bangkok	Men's team
Bronze medal – third place	1998 Bangkok	Men's doubles
World Junior Championships
Bronze medal – third place	1992 Jakarta	Boys' doubles

Yu Jinhao (Chinese: 余锦豪, born 12 November 1975 in Guangzhou) is a former Chinese badminton player. Yu joined the national team in 1997. He was part of the Chinese men's team that won the silver medal at the 1998 Asian Games in Bangkok, Thailand, and also won the bronze medal in the men's doubles event partnered with Liu Yong. He was ranked world No. 5 in the men's doubles in January 1999. Teamed with Chen Qiqiu, they competed at the 2000 Summer Olympics in Sydney, Australia. At the age of 25, due to injuries and other reasons, he left the national team. He works as a teacher in Yuyan Middle School and is a member of the Guangzhou CPPCC.

== Achievements ==
=== Asian Games ===
Men's doubles
Year	Venue	Partner	Opponent	Score	Result
1998	Thammasat Gymnasium 2 Bangkok, Thailand	(China) Liu Yong	(Indonesia) Rexy Mainaky (Indonesia) Ricky Subagja	10–15, 11–15	Bronze

=== World Junior Championships ===
Boys' doubles
Year	Venue	Partner	Opponent	Score	Result
1992	Istora Senayan; Jakarta, Indonesia	(China) Liu Yong	(Indonesia) Kusno (Indonesia) Amon Santoso		Bronze

=== IBF World Grand Prix ===
The World Badminton Grand Prix sanctioned by International Badminton Federation (IBF) since 1983.

Men's singles
Year	Tournament	Opponent	Score	Result
1994	Russian Open	(China) Chen Gang	13–18, 13–18	(silver) Runner-up

Men's doubles
Year	Tournament	Partner	Opponent	Score	Result
1999	Thailand Open	(China) Chen Qiqiu	(Denmark) Michael Søgaard (Denmark) Jim Laugesen	15–11, 15–13	(gold) Winner
1998	Malaysia Open	(China) Liu Yong	(Indonesia) Tony Gunawan (Indonesia) Halim Haryanto	15–6, 5–15, 11–15	(silver) Runner-up
1998	Swiss Open	(China) Liu Yong	(China) Zhang Wei (China) Zhang Jun	15–17, 7–15	(silver) Runner-up
