= 1993 Indonesia Open (badminton) =

The 1993 Indonesia Open in badminton was held in Jakarta, from July 21 to July 25, 1993. It was a five-star tournament and the prize money was US$166,000.

== Venue ==
- Istora Senayan

== Final results ==
Category	Winners	Runners-up	Score
Men's singles	(Indonesia) Alan Budikusuma	(Chinese Taipei) Fung Permadi	15–10, 14–17, 15–4
Women's singles	(China) Ye Zhaoying	(Indonesia) Susi Susanti	11-9, 12-11
Men's doubles	(Indonesia) Ricky Subagja & Rexy Mainaky	(Indonesia) Eddy Hartono & Richard Mainaky	15-13, 15-10
Women's doubles	(Indonesia) Finarsih & Lili Tampi	(Indonesia) Eliza Nathanael & Zelin Resiana	17-16, 15-12
Mixed doubles	(Indonesia) Gunawan & Rosiana Tendean	(Indonesia) Paulus & Herawaty	15-7, 15-3
