= Zelin Resiana =

Indonesian badminton player (born 1972)

Personal information
- Born: 9 July 1972 (age 54) Magelang, Central Java, Indonesia
- Height: 1.69 m (5 ft 7 in)
- Weight: 58 kg (128 lb)

Sport
- Country: Indonesia
- Sport: Badminton
- Handedness: Right

Women's & mixed doubles
- Highest ranking: 1
- BWF profile
Medal record
Women's badminton
Representing Indonesia
World Championships
Bronze medal – third place	1997 Glasgow	Women's doubles
World Cup
Gold medal – first place	1995 Jakarta	Women's doubles
Bronze medal – third place	1996 Jakarta	Women's doubles
Bronze medal – third place	1997 Yogyakarta	Women's doubles
Sudirman Cup
Silver medal – second place	1993 Birmingham	Mixed team
Silver medal – second place	1995 Lausanne	Mixed team
Bronze medal – third place	1997 Glasgow	Mixed team
Bronze medal – third place	1999 Copenhagen	Mixed team
Uber Cup
Gold medal – first place	1994 Jakarta	Women's team
Gold medal – first place	1996 Hong Kong	Women's team
Silver medal – second place	1998 Hong Kong	Women's team
Bronze medal – third place	2000 Kuala Lumpur	Women's team
Asian Games
Silver medal – second place	1994 Hiroshima	Women's team
Asian Championships
Bronze medal – third place	1995 Beijing	Women's doubles
Bronze medal – third place	1998 Bangkok	Mixed doubles
Bronze medal – third place	1999 Kuala Lumpur	Mixed doubles
Asian Cup
Bronze medal – third place	1994 Beijing	Women's doubles
Southeast Asian Games
Gold medal – first place	1993 Singapore	Women's team
Gold medal – first place	1995 Chiang Mai	Women's team
Gold medal – first place	1997 Jakarta	Women's doubles
Gold medal – first place	1997 Jakarta	Women's team
Silver medal – second place	1993 Singapore	Women's doubles
Silver medal – second place	1995 Chiang Mai	Women's doubles

Zelin Resiana (born 9 July 1972) is an Indonesian former badminton player who specialized in doubles. She trained at the Djarum club. For her achievements in badminton, a statue of her has been unveiled outside GOR Djarum in Tidar, Magelang, and inaugurated on 21 August 2015.

== Career ==
Resiana won the women's doubles at the U.S. (1996) and Indonesia (1996, 1997) Opens and at the Southeast Asian Games (1997) with Eliza Nathanael. They were runners-up at the All England Open in 1995 and 1997, and were bronze medalists at the 1997 IBF World Championships. Resiana and Nathanael were eliminated in the quarterfinals of the 1996 Olympic Games event in Atlanta, Georgia, United States by the eventual champions, China's Ge Fei and Gu Jun. In the mixed doubles, she won the 1993 Chinese Taipei Open with Denny Kantono. Resiana and Bambang Suprianto were eliminated in the quarterfinals of mixed doubles at the 2000 Summer Olympics in Sydney. Resiana was a member of the world champion Indonesian Uber Cup (women's international) teams in 1994 and 1996.

== Personal life ==
Resiana married former Indonesian men's singles badminton player, Joko Suprianto in 1999, and the two have twins on 24 March 2003.

== Achievements ==
=== World Championships ===
Women's doubles
Year	Venue	Partner	Opponent	Score	Result
1997	Scotstoun Centre, Glasgow, Scotland	(Indonesia) Eliza Nathanael	(China) Qin Yiyuan (China) Tang Yongshu	15–11, 11–15, 9–15	Bronze

=== World Cup ===
Women's doubles
Year	Venue	Partner	Opponent	Score	Result
1995	Istora Senayan; Jakarta, Indonesia	(Indonesia) Eliza Nathanael	(Indonesia) Finarsih (Indonesia) Lili Tampi	10–15, 15–11, 10–11 retired	Gold
1996	Istora Senayan, Jakarta, Indonesia	(Indonesia) Eliza Nathanael	(China) Qin Yiyuan (China) Tang Yongshu	9–15, 4–15	Bronze
1997	Among Rogo Sports Hall; Yogyakarta, Indonesia	(Indonesia) Eliza Nathanael	(China) Ge Fei (China) Gu Jun	9–15, 5–15	Bronze

=== Asian Championships ===
Women's doubles
Year	Venue	Partner	Opponent	Score	Result
1995	Olympic Sports Center Gymnasium, Beijing, China	(Indonesia) Eliza Nathanael	(China) Ge Fei (China) Gu Jun	4–15, 5–15	Bronze

Mixed doubles
Year	Venue	Partner	Opponent	Score	Result
1998	Nimibutr Stadium; Bangkok, Thailand	(Indonesia) Bambang Suprianto	(China) Sun Jun (China) Ge Fei	5–15, 15–17	Bronze
1999	Kuala Lumpur Badminton Stadium; Kuala Lumpur, Malaysia	(Indonesia) Tri Kusharjanto	(South Korea) Kim Dong-moon (South Korea) Ra Kyung-min	15–13, 11–15, 6–15	Bronze

=== Asian Cup ===
Women's doubles
Year	Venue	Partner	Opponent	Score	Result
1994	Beijing Gymnasium, Beijing, China	(Indonesia) Finarsih	(China) Chen Ying (China) Wu Yuhong	–, –	Bronze

=== Southeast Asian Games ===
Women's doubles
Year	Venue	Partner	Opponent	Score	Result
1993	Singapore Badminton Hall, Singapore	(Indonesia) Eliza Nathanael	(Indonesia) Finarsih (Indonesia) Lili Tampi	5–15, 15–6, 5–15	Silver
1995	Gymnasium 3, 700th Anniversary Sport Complex; Chiang Mai, Thailand	(Indonesia) Eliza Nathanael	(Indonesia) Finarsih (Indonesia) Lili Tampi	7–15, 3–15	Silver
1997	Asia-Africa hall, Gelora Bung Karno Sports Complex; Jakarta, Indonesia	(Indonesia) Eliza Nathanael	(Indonesia) Indarti Issolina (Indonesia) Deyana Lomban	15–5, 15–13	Gold

=== IBF World Grand Prix ===
The World Badminton Grand Prix was sanctioned by the International Badminton Federation from 1983 to 2006.

Women's doubles
Year	Tournament	Partner	Opponent	Score	Result
1993	Indonesia Open	(Indonesia) Eliza Nathanael	(Indonesia) Finarsih (Indonesia) Lili Tampi	16–17, 12–15	(silver) Runner-up
1993	Hong Kong Open	(Indonesia) Eliza Nathanael	(China) Chen Ying (China) Wu Yuhong	7–15, 8–15	(silver) Runner-up
1994	Malaysia Open	(Indonesia) Eliza Nathanael	(China) Ge Fei (China) Gu Jun	5–15, 11–15	(silver) Runner-up
1995	All England Open	(Indonesia) Eliza Nathanael	(South Korea) Gil Young-ah (South Korea) Jang Hye-ock	6–15, 3–15	(silver) Runner-up
1995	German Open	(Indonesia) Eliza Nathanael	(China) Chen Ying (China) Peng Xinyong	Walkover	(gold) Winner
1996	Indonesia Open	(Indonesia) Eliza Nathanael	(Denmark) Helene Kirkegaard (Denmark) Rikke Olsen	15–7, 15–4	(gold) Winner
1996	U.S. Open	(Indonesia) Eliza Nathanael	(England) Julie Bradbury (England) Joanne Goode	15–7, 15–5	(gold) Winner
1996	World Grand Prix Finals	(Indonesia) Eliza Nathanael	(China) Ge Fei (China) Gu Jun	4–15, 4–15	(silver) Runner-up
1997	Japan Open	(Indonesia) Eliza Nathanael	(China) Ge Fei (China) Gu Jun	15–12, 12–15, 1–15	(silver) Runner-up
1997	All England Open	(Indonesia) Eliza Nathanael	(China) Ge Fei (China) Gu Jun	6–15, 9–15	(silver) Runner-up
1997	Indonesia Open	(Indonesia) Eliza Nathanael	(Indonesia) Finarsih (Indonesia) Minarti Timur	15–10, 15–5	(gold) Winner
1997	Thailand Open	(Indonesia) Eliza Nathanael	(China) Qin Yiyuan (China) Tang Yongshu	8–15, 2–15	(silver) Runner-up
1997	Vietnam Open	(Indonesia) Eliza Nathanael	(Indonesia) Deyana Lomban (Indonesia) Indarti Issolina	15–11, 12–15, 15–11	(gold) Winner
1998	Malaysia Open	(Indonesia) Eliza Nathanael	(Denmark) Marlene Thomsen (Denmark) Rikke Olsen	8–15, 4–15	(silver) Runner-up

Mixed doubles
Year	Tournament	Partner	Opponent	Score	Result
1992	Thailand Open	(Indonesia) Denny Kantono	(Indonesia) Aryono Miranat (Indonesia) Eliza Nathanael	2–15, 15–2, 1–15	(silver) Runner-up
1993	Chinese Taipei Open	(Indonesia) Denny Kantono	(England) Nick Ponting (England) Gillian Clark	Walkover	(gold) Winner
1999	Chinese Taipei Open	(Indonesia) Bambang Suprianto	(China) Liu Yong (China) Ge Fei	12–15, 10–15	(silver) Runner-up
1999	Indonesia Open	(Indonesia) Bambang Suprianto	(Indonesia) Tri Kusharjanto (Indonesia) Minarti Timur	3–15, 4–15	(silver) Runner-up

IBF Grand Prix tournament
IBF Grand Prix Finals tournament

=== IBF Junior International (1 title) ===
Girls' doubles
Year	Tournament	Partner	Opponent	Score	Result	Ref.
1991	German Junior	(Indonesia) The Ai Ling	(Soviet Union) Saule Kustavletova (Soviet Union) Irina Yakusheva		(gold) Winner	
