= Zhang Jun (badminton) =

Chinese badminton player

Zhang Jun 张军
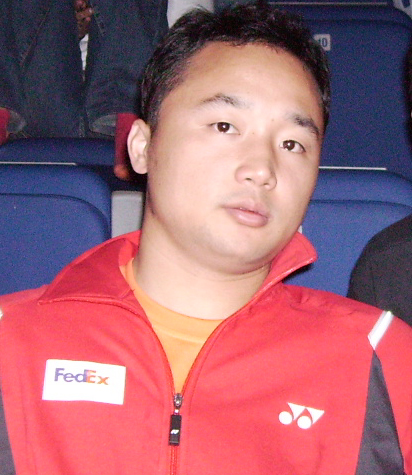
- Zhang in 2006

Personal information
- Born: November 26, 1977 (age 48) Suzhou, Jiangsu, China
- Height: 1.75 m (5 ft 9 in)
- Weight: 75 kg (165 lb; 11.8 st)

Sport
- Country: China
- Sport: Badminton
- Handedness: Left

Mixed doubles
- Highest ranking: 1 (with Gao Ling) (June 7, 2001)
- BWF profile
Medal record
Men's badminton
Representing China
Olympic Games
Gold medal – first place	2000 Sydney	Mixed doubles
Gold medal – first place	2004 Athens	Mixed doubles
World Championships
Gold medal – first place	2001 Seville	Mixed doubles
Silver medal – second place	2003 Birmingham	Mixed doubles
Bronze medal – third place	1999 Copenhagen	Men's doubles
Sudirman Cup
Gold medal – first place	1999 Copenhagen	Mixed team
Gold medal – first place	2001 Seville	Mixed team
Thomas Cup
Silver medal – second place	2000 Kuala Lumpur	Men's team
Bronze medal – third place	1998 Hong Kong	Men's team
Bronze medal – third place	2002 Guangzhou	Men's team
Asian Games
Silver medal – second place	1998 Bangkok	Men's team
Bronze medal – third place	1998 Bangkok	Mixed doubles
Bronze medal – third place	2002 Busan	Men's team
Asia Championships
Gold medal – first place	1997 Kuala Lumpur	Mixed doubles
Gold medal – first place	2002 Bangkok	Mixed doubles
Silver medal – second place	1998 Bangkok	Men's doubles
Silver medal – second place	1999 Kuala Lumpur	Men's doubles
Asia Cup
Gold medal – first place	2001 Singapore	Men's team

Zhang Jun (simplified Chinese: 张军; traditional Chinese: 張軍; pinyin: Zhāng Jūn; born November 26, 1977, in Suzhou, Jiangsu) is a former male badminton player from the People's Republic of China. Following his retirement as an international player, he was a coach with the Chinese national team, and the chairman of the Chinese Badminton Association.

== Career ==
As a doubles specialist, the solidly built Zhang Jun won several international men's doubles titles with compatriot Zhang Wei including the Swiss (1998), China (2001), and Thailand (2005) Opens. However, the majority of his titles, and the most prestigious ones, came in mixed doubles when he teamed up with the formidable Gao Ling. These included consecutive gold medals at the 2000 and 2004 Olympic Games, earned by surviving a number of very close matches, particularly in 2000 when they were on the verge of elimination in the semifinals. In a similar fashion, Zhang and Gao captured the 2001 IBF World Championships by squeezing past the brilliant South Korean duo Kim Dong-moon and Ra Kyung-min 17–16 in the third game. Zhang's other titles with Gao include three victories (2001, 2003, and 2006) at the prestigious All-England Championships; the Badminton Asia Championships in 2002; the China Masters in 2005; and the China (2002, 2003), Japan (2003), Indonesia (2004), Malaysia (2004, 2006), Thailand (2005), Singapore (2005), and German (2006) Opens.

Zhang had the honor of being an Olympic torch carrier at the opening ceremony of the 2008 Beijing Games.

After retirement, Zhang Jun coached the Chinese national badminton team. He was promoted to head coach of the national badminton doubles team in 2017, before being selected as vice chairman of the Chinese Badminton Association (CBA) in 2018.

On January 28, 2019, Zhang Jun was elected as the chairman of Chinese Badminton Association.

Zhang Jun, as the chairman of the Chinese Badminton Association, competed with Khunying Patama, his counterpart from the Badminton Association of Thailand and Anton Aditya Subowo, president of Badminton Asia, for the position of BWF deputy president but lost; Patama was elected deputy president in May 2019, during the Sudirman Cup tournament in Nanning, China.

=== Investigation ===
In April 2026, it was reported that Zhang, who had been missing for at least 10 days, had been was put under investigation by disciplinary authorities. On 29 April, the Central Commission for Discipline Inspection and the National Supervisory Commission announced that Zhang was being investigated for alleged "serious violations of discipline and laws".

== Personal life ==
Zhang Jun married synchronised swimmer Hu Ni in 2006. Their son was born in 2009. (Zhang Jun's former doubles partner Cai Yun, whom he later also coached, married Hu Ni's teammate Wang Na in 2010.)

== Achievements ==
=== Olympic Games ===
Mixed doubles
Year	Venue	Partner	Opponent	Score	Result
2000	The Dome; Sydney, Australia	(China) Gao Ling	(Indonesia) Trikus Haryanto (Indonesia) Minarti Timur	1–15, 15–13, 15–11	Gold
2004	Goudi Olympic Hall; Athens, Greece	(China) Gao Ling	(United Kingdom) Nathan Robertson (United Kingdom) Gail Emms	15–1, 12–15, 15–12	Gold

=== World Championships ===
Men's doubles
Year	Venue	Partner	Opponent	Score	Result
1999	Brøndby Arena, Copenhagen, Denmark	(China) Zhang Wei	(South Korea) Ha Tae-kwon (South Korea) Kim Dong-moon	6–15, 15–17	Bronze

Mixed doubles
Year	Venue	Partner	Opponent	Score	Result
2003	National Indoor Arena; Birmingham, England	(China) Gao Ling	(South Korea) Kim Dong-moon (South Korea) Ra Kyung-min	7–15, 8–15	Silver
2001	Palacio de Deportes de San Pablo; Seville, Spain	(China) Gao Ling	(South Korea) Kim Dong-moon (South Korea) Ra Kyung-min	15–10, 12–15, 17–16	Gold

=== Asian Games ===
Mixed Doubles
Year	Venue	Partner	Opponent	Score	Result
1998	Thammasat Gymnasium 2 Bangkok, Thailand	(China) Qin Yiyuan	(South Korea) Kim Dong-moon (South Korea) Ra Kyung-min	3–15, 6–15	Bronze

=== Asian Championships ===
Men's doubles
Year	Venue	Partner	Opponent	Score	Result
1998	Bangkok, Thailand	(China) Zhang Wei	(South Korea) Ha Tae-kwon (South Korea) Kang Kyung-jin	15–12, 11–15, 13–15	Silver
1999	Kuala Lumpur, Malaysia	(China) Zhang Wei	(South Korea) Ha Tae-kwon (South Korea) Kim Dong-moon	6–15, 4–15	Silver

Mixed doubles
Year	Venue	Partner	Opponent	Score	Result
1997	Bangkok, Thailand	(China) Liu Lu	(China) Yang Ming (China) Qian Hong	15–12, 17–16	Gold
2002	Bangkok, Thailand	(China) Gao Ling	(Thailand) Khunakorn Sudhisodhi (Thailand) Saralee Thungthongkam	11–7, 11–8	Gold

=== IBF World Grand Prix (16 titles, 11 runners-up) ===
The World Badminton Grand Prix sanctioned by International Badminton Federation (IBF) since 1983.

Men's doubles
Year	Tournament	Partner	Opponent	Score	Result
1998	Swedish Open	(China) Yang Ming	(Indonesia) Candra Wijaya (Indonesia) Tony Gunawan	3–15, 6–15	(silver) Runner-Up
1998	Swiss Open	(China) Zhang Wei	(China) Liu Yong (China) Yu Jinhao	17–15, 15–7	(gold) Winner
2000	Thailand Open	(China) Zhang Wei	(Indonesia) Sigit Budiarto (Indonesia) Halim Haryanto	15–5, 15–10	(gold) Winner
2001	China Open	(China) Zhang Wei	(China) Chen Qiqiu (China) Liu Yong	7–1, 4–7, 8–6 4–7, 7–5	(gold) Winner

Mixed doubles
Year	Tournament	Partner	Opponent	Score	Result
2006	Macau Open	(China) Gao Ling	(Denmark) Thomas Laybourn (Denmark) Kamilla Rytter Juhl	19–21, 20–22	(silver) Runner-up
2006	Malaysia Open	(China) Gao Ling	(Denmark) Jonas Rasmussen (Denmark) Britta Andersen	19–21, 21–14, 21–15	(gold) Winner
2006	China Masters	(China) Gao Ling	(China) Xie Zhongbo (China) Zhang Yawen	16–21, 21–10, 20–22	(silver) Runner-up
2006	All England Open	(China) Gao Ling	(England) Nathan Robertson (England) Gail Emms	12–15, 17–15, 15–1	(gold) Winner
2006	German Open	(China) Gao Ling	(China) Xie Zhongbo (China) Zhang Yawen	15–11, 15–12	(gold) Winner
2005	China Masters	(China) Gao Ling	(Singapore) Hendri Kurniawan Saputra (Singapore) Li Yujia	15–7, 15–13	(gold) Winner
2005	Singapore Open	(China) Gao Ling	(Thailand) Sudket Prapakamol (Thailand) Saralee Thungthongkam	10–15, 15–7, 15–5	(gold) Winner
2004	Indonesia Open	(China) Gao Ling	(England) Robert Blair (England) Natalie Munt	15–9, 15–9	(gold) Winner
2004	Malaysia Open	(China) Gao Ling	(South Korea) Kim Yong-hyun (South Korea) Lee Hyo-jung	15–2, 15–11	(gold) Winner
2004	Swiss Open	(China) Gao Ling	(South Korea) Kim Dong-moon (South Korea) Ra Kyung-min	2–15, 8–15	(silver) Runner-up
2003	China Open	(China) Gao Ling	(China) Chen Qiqiu (China) Zhao Tingting	15–13, 15–6	(gold) Winner
2003	Hong Kong Open	(China) Gao Ling	(South Korea) Kim Dong-moon (South Korea) Ra Kyung-min	7–15, 10–15	(silver) Runner-up
2003	German Open	(China) Gao Ling	(South Korea) Kim Dong-moon (South Korea) Ra Kyung-min	12–15, 15–11, 8–15	(silver) Runner-up
2003	Indonesia Open	(China) Gao Ling	(South Korea) Kim Dong-moon (South Korea) Ra Kyung-min	15–10, 11–15, 6–15	(silver) Runner-up
2003	Japan Open	(China) Gao Ling	(Denmark) Jens Eriksen (Denmark) Mette Schjoldager	9–11, 11–8, 11–9	(gold) Winner
2003	All England Open	(China) Gao Ling	(China) Chen Qiqiu (China) Zhao Tingting	11–6, 11–7	(gold) Winner
2002	China Open	(China) Gao Ling	(China) Chen Qiqiu (China) Zhao Tingting	11–4, 11–4	(gold) Winner
2001	All England Open	(China) Gao Ling	(Denmark) Michael Søgaard (Denmark) Rikke Olsen	10–15, 15–8, 15–9	(gold) Winner
2001	Korea Open	(China) Gao Ling	(South Korea) Kim Dong-moon (South Korea) Ra Kyung-min	8–15, 11–15	(silver) Runner-up
2000	Thailand Open	(China) Gao Ling	(England) Simon Archer (England) Joanne Goode	15–13, 15–12	(gold) Winner
2000	Swiss Open	(China) Gao Ling	(South Korea) Kim Dong-moon (South Korea) Ra Kyung-min	8–15, 9–15	(silver) Runner-up
1999	China Open	(China) Gao Ling	(China) Liu Yong (China) Ge Fei	8–15, 5–15	(silver) Runner-up
1999	Denmark Open	(China) Gao Ling	(China) Liu Yong (China) Ge Fei	12–15, 14–17	(silver) Runner-up
