= Korea Open (badminton) =

Annual badminton tournament in South Korea

- Official website
- Founded: 1991; 35 years ago
- Editions: 33 (2026)
- Location: Yeosu (2026); South Korea
- Venue: Jinnam Stadium (2026)
- Prize money: US$500,000 (2026)

Men's
- Draw: 32S / 32D
- Current champions: Victor Lai (singles); Kim Won-ho; Seo Seung-jae (doubles)
- Most singles titles: 4 Peter Gade
- Most doubles titles: 6 Lee Yong-dae

Women's
- Draw: 32S / 32D
- Current champions: An Se-young (singles); Rui Hirokami; Sayaka Hobara (doubles)
- Most singles titles: 3 Bang Soo-hyun; An Se-young
- Most doubles titles: 4 Chung So-young; Gil Young-ah; Yang Wei

Mixed doubles
- Draw: 32
- Current champions: Jiang Zhenbang; Wei Yaxin
- Most titles (male): 6 Kim Dong-moon
- Most titles (female): 7 Ra Kyung-min

Super 500
- Arctic Open; Australian Open; Hong Kong Open; Hylo Open; Indonesia Masters; Japan Masters; Korea Open; Malaysia Masters; Thailand Open

Last completed
- 2026 Korea Open

The Korea Open (Korean: 코리아오픈) is an annual badminton event that is commonly held in Seoul, South Korea. The tournament used to be known as Korea Open Super Series because it became one of the BWF Super Series tournaments beginning with 2007. BWF categorised Korea Open as one of the seven BWF World Tour Super 500 events in the BWF events structure since 2018.

The tournament has been organised since 1991. However, the 1998 tournament was canceled due to the poor economic conditions in the country.

== Host cities ==
City	Years host
Seoul	1991–1999, 2006–2015, 2017–2018
Jeju City	2000–2001
Yeosu	2002, 2023, 2026
Incheon	2003, 2005, 2019
Chungju	2004
Seongnam	2016
Suncheon	2022
Mokpo	2024
Suwon	2025

Locations of Korea Open host cities

== Past winners ==
Year	Men's singles	Women's singles	Men's doubles	Women's doubles	Mixed doubles
1991	(China) Wu Wenkai	(China) Huang Hua	(South Korea) Kim Moon-soo (South Korea) Park Joo-bong	(South Korea) Chung So-young (South Korea) Hwang Hye-young	(South Korea) Park Joo-bong (South Korea) Chung Myung-hee
1992	(China) Wu Wenkai	(China) Tang Jiuhong	(South Korea) Kim Moon-soo (South Korea) Park Joo-bong	(South Korea) Chung So-young (South Korea) Hwang Hye-young	(Denmark) Thomas Lund (Denmark) Pernille Dupont
1993	(Indonesia) Joko Suprianto	(South Korea) Bang Soo-hyun	(China) Huang Zhanzhong (China) Zheng Yumin	(South Korea) Chung So-young (South Korea) Gil Young-ah	(Denmark) Thomas Lund (Sweden) Catrine Bengtsson
1994	(Indonesia) Ardy Wiranata	(South Korea) Bang Soo-hyun	(Sweden) Peter Axelsson (Sweden) Pär-Gunnar Jönsson	(South Korea) Chung So-young (South Korea) Gil Young-ah	(Denmark) Michael Søgaard (England) Gillian Gowers
1995	(Indonesia) Hariyanto Arbi	(Indonesia) Susi Susanti	(Indonesia) Rexy Mainaky (Indonesia) Ricky Subagja	(South Korea) Gil Young-ah (South Korea) Jang Hye-ock	(Denmark) Thomas Lund (Denmark) Marlene Thomsen
1996	(South Korea) Kim Hak-kyun	(South Korea) Bang Soo-hyun	(Indonesia) Rexy Mainaky (Indonesia) Ricky Subagja	(South Korea) Gil Young-ah (South Korea) Jang Hye-ock	(South Korea) Park Joo-bong (South Korea) Ra Kyung-min
1997	(Denmark) Thomas Stuer-Lauridsen	(China) Ye Zhaoying	(South Korea) Ha Tae-kwon (South Korea) Kang Kyung-jin	(China) Ge Fei (China) Gu Jun	(China) Liu Yong (China) Ge Fei
1998	No competition				
1999	(Chinese Taipei) Fung Permadi	(China) Zhou Mi	(Indonesia) Eng Hian (Indonesia) Flandy Limpele	(China) Huang Nanyan (China) Yang Wei	(South Korea) Kim Dong-moon (South Korea) Ra Kyung-min
2000	(Denmark) Peter Gade	(Denmark) Camilla Martin	(South Korea) Lee Dong-soo (South Korea) Yoo Yong-sung	(South Korea) Chung Jae-hee (South Korea) Ra Kyung-min	(South Korea) Kim Dong-moon (South Korea) Ra Kyung-min
2001	(Denmark) Peter Gade	(Denmark) Camilla Martin	(South Korea) Ha Tae-kwon (South Korea) Kim Dong-moon	(China) Huang Nanyan (China) Yang Wei	(South Korea) Kim Dong-moon (South Korea) Ra Kyung-min
2002	(China) Lin Dan	(China) Zhang Ning	(South Korea) Ha Tae-kwon (South Korea) Kim Dong-moon	(China) Gao Ling (China) Huang Sui	(South Korea) Kim Dong-moon (South Korea) Ra Kyung-min
2003	(Denmark) Kenneth Jonassen	(Netherlands) Mia Audina	(South Korea) Ha Tae-kwon (South Korea) Kim Dong-moon	(South Korea) Ra Kyung-min (South Korea) Lee Kyung-won	(South Korea) Kim Dong-moon (South Korea) Ra Kyung-min
2004	(China) Xia Xuanze	(China) Zhang Ning	(Indonesia) Luluk Hadiyanto (Indonesia) Alvent Yulianto	(China) Yang Wei (China) Zhang Jiewen	(South Korea) Kim Dong-moon (South Korea) Ra Kyung-min
2005	(Denmark) Peter Gade	(South Korea) Jun Jae-youn	(Denmark) Jens Eriksen (Denmark) Martin Lundgaard Hansen	(South Korea) Lee Hyo-jung (South Korea) Lee Kyung-won	(South Korea) Lee Jae-jin (South Korea) Lee Hyo-jung
2006	(China) Bao Chunlai	(China) Lu Lan	(United States) Tony Gunawan (Indonesia) Candra Wijaya	(China) Yang Wei (China) Zhang Jiewen	(Indonesia) Nova Widianto (Indonesia) Liliyana Natsir
2007	(China) Lin Dan	(China) Xie Xingfang	(South Korea) Jung Jae-sung (South Korea) Lee Yong-dae	(China) Gao Ling (China) Huang Sui	(China) Zheng Bo (China) Gao Ling
2008	(South Korea) Lee Hyun-il	(Hong Kong) Zhou Mi	(China) Cai Yun (China) Fu Haifeng	(China) Du Jing (China) Yu Yang	(South Korea) Lee Yong-dae (South Korea) Lee Hyo-jung
2009	(Denmark) Peter Gade	(Denmark) Tine Rasmussen	(Denmark) Mathias Boe (Denmark) Carsten Mogensen	(Chinese Taipei) Chien Yu-chin (Chinese Taipei) Cheng Wen-hsing	(South Korea) Lee Yong-dae (South Korea) Lee Hyo-jung
2010	(Malaysia) Lee Chong Wei	(China) Wang Shixian	(South Korea) Jung Jae-sung (South Korea) Lee Yong-dae	(China) Cheng Shu (China) Zhao Yunlei	(China) He Hanbin (China) Yu Yang
2011	(China) Lin Dan	(China) Wang Yihan	(South Korea) Jung Jae-sung (South Korea) Lee Yong-dae	(China) Wang Xiaoli (China) Yu Yang	(China) Zhang Nan (China) Zhao Yunlei
2012	(Malaysia) Lee Chong Wei	(China) Wang Shixian	(China) Cai Yun (China) Fu Haifeng	(China) Tian Qing (China) Zhao Yunlei	(China) Xu Chen (China) Ma Jin
2013	(Malaysia) Lee Chong Wei	(South Korea) Sung Ji-hyun	(South Korea) Ko Sung-hyun (South Korea) Lee Yong-dae	(China) Wang Xiaoli (China) Yu Yang	(China) Zhang Nan (China) Zhao Yunlei
2014	(China) Chen Long	(China) Wang Yihan	(Denmark) Mathias Boe (Denmark) Carsten Mogensen	(China) Bao Yixin (China) Tang Jinhua	(China) Zhang Nan (China) Zhao Yunlei
2015	(China) Chen Long	(South Korea) Sung Ji-hyun	(South Korea) Lee Yong-dae (South Korea) Yoo Yeon-seong	(Indonesia) Nitya Krishinda Maheswari (Indonesia) Greysia Polii	(China) Zhang Nan (China) Zhao Yunlei
2016	(China) Qiao Bin	(Japan) Akane Yamaguchi	(South Korea) Lee Yong-dae (South Korea) Yoo Yeon-seong	(South Korea) Jung Kyung-eun (South Korea) Shin Seung-chan	(South Korea) Ko Sung-hyun (South Korea) Kim Ha-na
2017	(Indonesia) Anthony Sinisuka Ginting	(India) P. V. Sindhu	(Denmark) Mathias Boe (Denmark) Carsten Mogensen	(China) Huang Yaqiong (China) Yu Xiaohan	(Indonesia) Praveen Jordan (Indonesia) Debby Susanto
2018	(Chinese Taipei) Chou Tien-chen	(Japan) Nozomi Okuhara	(Japan) Hiroyuki Endo (Japan) Yuta Watanabe	(Japan) Misaki Matsutomo (Japan) Ayaka Takahashi	(China) He Jiting (China) Du Yue
2019	(Japan) Kento Momota	(China) He Bingjiao	(Indonesia) Fajar Alfian (Indonesia) Muhammad Rian Ardianto	(South Korea) Kim So-yeong (South Korea) Kong Hee-yong	(Thailand) Dechapol Puavaranukroh (Thailand) Sapsiree Taerattanachai
2020	Cancelled (Note: This tournament, originally to be played from 8 to 13 September, was later cancelled due to COVID-19 pandemic in South Korea.)				
2021	Cancelled (Note: This tournament, originally to be played from 31 August to 5 September, was later cancelled due to COVID-19 pandemic in South Korea.)				
2022	(China) Weng Hongyang	(South Korea) An Se-young	(South Korea) Kang Min-hyuk (South Korea) Seo Seung-jae	(South Korea) Jeong Na-eun (South Korea) Kim Hye-jeong	(Malaysia) Tan Kian Meng (Malaysia) Lai Pei Jing
2023	(Denmark) Anders Antonsen	(South Korea) An Se-young	(India) Satwiksairaj Rankireddy (India) Chirag Shetty	(China) Chen Qingchen (China) Jia Yifan	(China) Feng Yanzhe (China) Huang Dongping
2024	(China) Lu Guangzu	(South Korea) Kim Ga-eun	(Indonesia) Leo Rolly Carnando (Indonesia) Bagas Maulana	(South Korea) Jeong Na-eun (South Korea) Kim Hye-jeong	(Malaysia) Chen Tang Jie (Malaysia) Toh Ee Wei
2025	(Indonesia) Jonatan Christie	(Japan) Akane Yamaguchi	(South Korea) Kim Won-ho (South Korea) Seo Seung-jae	(South Korea) Kim Hye-jeong (South Korea) Kong Hee-yong	(China) Feng Yanzhe (China) Huang Dongping
2026	(Canada) Victor Lai	(South Korea) An Se-young	(South Korea) Kim Won-ho (South Korea) Seo Seung-jae	(Japan) Rui Hirokami (Japan) Sayaka Hobara	(China) Jiang Zhenbang (China) Wei Yaxin

== Performances by nation ==
As of the 2026 edition

	Nation	MS	WS	MD	WD	XD	Total
1	China	12	13	3	15	12	55
2	South Korea*	2	10	16	14	12	54
3	Denmark	7	3	4		3	17
4	Indonesia	5	1	6.5	1	2	15.5
5	Japan	1	3	1	2		7
6	Malaysia	3				2	5
7	Chinese Taipei	2			1		3
8	India		1	1			2
9	Sweden			1		0.5	1.5
10	Canada	1					1
10	Hong Kong		1				1
10	Netherlands		1				1
10	Thailand					1	1
14	England					0.5	0.5
14	United States			0.5			0.5
	Total	33	33	33	33	33	165

* Host nation
