= Zhang Wei (badminton, born 1977) =

Chinese badminton player (born 1977)

Zhang Wei 张尉
Personal information
- Born: 2 December 1977 (age 48) Shanghai, China
- Height: 1.76 m (5 ft 9 in)

Sport
- Country: China
- Sport: Badminton
- Handedness: Right
- Event: Men's & mixed doubles
Medal record
Men's badminton
Representing China
World Championships
Bronze medal – third place	1999 Copenhagen	Men's doubles
Sudirman Cup
Gold medal – first place	2005 Beijing	Mixed team
Gold medal – first place	2001 Seville	Mixed team
Gold medal – first place	1999 Copenhagen	Mixed team
Silver medal – second place	2003 Eindhoven	Mixed team
Thomas Cup
Silver medal – second place	2000 Kuala Lumpur	Men's team
Bronze medal – third place	2002 Guangzhou	Men's team
Bronze medal – third place	1998 Hong Kong	Men's team
Asian Games
Silver medal – second place	1998 Bangkok	Men's team
Bronze medal – third place	2002 Busan	Men's team
Asian Championships
Silver medal – second place	1999 Kuala Lumpur	Men's doubles
Silver medal – second place	1998 Bangkok	Men's doubles
Asian Cup
Bronze medal – third place	1996 Seoul	Men's doubles
Asia Cup
Gold medal – first place	2001 Singapore	Men's team
World Junior Championships
Gold medal – first place	1994 Kuala Lumpur	Mixed doubles

Zhang Wei (Chinese: 张尉, born 2 December 1977) is a former Chinese badminton player. Zhang was selected to join the national team in 1997. He played in the men's doubles event partnered with Zhang Jun. He participated in four consecutive Sudirman Cup, winning 3 gold medals in 1999, 2001, 2005, and a silver medal in 2003. He and Zhang Jun was qualified to compete at the 2000 Summer Olympics, but because of the injury on his left abdominal muscles while doing the exercises, he missed the event. He retired from the national team in 2005, and started to playing in Denmark. He returned to Shanghai in 2007, and star coaching the Shanghai team. He also competed for Shanghai at the 2009 National Games.

== Achievements ==
=== World Championships ===
Men's doubles
Year	Venue	Partner	Opponent	Score	Result
1999	Brøndby Arena; Copenhagen, Denmark	(China) Zhang Jun	(South Korea) Ha Tae-kwon (South Korea) Kim Dong-moon	6–15, 15–17	Bronze

=== Asian Championships ===
Men's doubles
Year	Venue	Partner	Opponent	Score	Result
1999	Kuala Lumpur, Malaysia	(China) Zhang Jun	(South Korea) Ha Tae-kwon (South Korea) Kim Dong-moon	6–15, 4–15	Silver
1998	Bangkok, Thailand	(China) Zhang Jun	(South Korea) Ha Tae-kwon (South Korea) Kang Kyung-jin	15–12, 11–15, 13–15	Silver

=== Asian Cup ===
Men's doubles
Year	Venue	Partner	Opponent	Score	Result
1996	Olympic Gymnasium No. 2 Seoul, South Korea	(China) Liu Yong	(Indonesia) Rudy Wijaya (Indonesia) Tony Gunawan	9–15, 6–15	Bronze

=== World Junior Championships ===
Mixed doubles
Year	Venue	Partner	Opponent	Score	Result
1994	Kuala Lumpur, Malaysia	(China) Qiang Hong	(China) Yang Bing (China) Yao Jie	15–8, 15–6	Gold

=== IBF World Grand Prix ===
The World Badminton Grand Prix sanctioned by International Badminton Federation (IBF) since 1983.

Men's doubles
Year	Tournament	Partner	Opponent	Score	Result
2001	China Open	(China) Zhang Jun	(China) Chen Qiqiu (China) Liu Yong	7–1, 4–7, 8–6 4–7, 7–5	(gold) Winner
2000	Thailand Open	(China) Zhang Jun	(Indonesia) Sigit Budiarto (Indonesia) Halim Haryanto	15–5, 15–10	(gold) Winner
1998	Swiss Open	(China) Zhang Jun	(China) Liu Yong (China) Yu Jinhao	17–15, 15–7	(gold) Winner
1997	China Open	(China) Liu Yong	(China) Ge Cheng (China) Tao Xiaoqiang	3–15, 7–15	(silver) Runner-up
1997	U.S. Open	(China) Liu Yong	(South Korea) Ha Tae-kwon (South Korea) Kim Dong-moon	3–15, 15–6, 12–15	(silver) Runner-up
1996	Vietnam Open	(China) Liu Yong	(Malaysia) Lee Wan Wah (Malaysia) Choong Tan Fook	6–15, 6–15	(silver) Runner-up
1996	Dutch Open	(China) Liu Yong	(China) Ge Cheng (China) Tao Xiaoqiang	8–11, 11–9, 4–9, 9–7, 3–9	(silver) Runner-up

=== IBF International ===
Mixed doubles
Year	Tournament	Partner	Opponent	Score	Result
2004	Smiling Fish Satellite	(China) Tao Xiaolan	(Thailand) Songphon Anugritayawon (Thailand) Duanganong Aroonkesorn	15–6, 13–15, 6–15	(silver) Runner-up
