= Indonesia Open (badminton) =

Badminton championships

- Official website
- Founded: 1982; 44 years ago
- Editions: 44 (2026)
- Location: Jakarta (2026); Indonesia
- Venue: Istora Gelora Bung Karno (2026)
- Prize money: US$1,450,000 (2026)

Men's
- Draw: 32S / 32D
- Current champions: Victor Lai (singles); Goh Sze Fei; Nur Izzuddin (doubles)
- Most singles titles: 6 Ardy Wiranata; Taufik Hidayat; Lee Chong Wei
- Most doubles titles: 4 Hariamanto Kartono; Ricky Subagja; Rexy Mainaky; Candra Wijaya; Lee Yong-dae

Women's
- Draw: 32S / 32D
- Current champions: An Se-young (singles); Yuki Fukushima; Mayu Matsumoto (doubles)
- Most singles titles: 6 Susi Susanti
- Most doubles titles: 3 Rosiana Tendean; Eliza Nathanael; Yu Yang; Yuki Fukushima

Mixed doubles
- Draw: 32
- Current champions: Mathias Christiansen; Alexandra Bøje
- Most titles (male): 6 Tri Kusharjanto
- Most titles (female): 6 Minarti Timur

Super 1000
- All England Open; China Open; Indonesia Open; Malaysia Open

Last completed
- 2026 Indonesia Open

The Indonesia Open (Indonesian: Indonesia Terbuka) is an annual badminton tournament organized by the Badminton Association of Indonesia (PBSI) since 1982. It became part of the BWF Super Series tournament in 2007 and got the Super Series Premier status in 2011. Following the restructurisation to BWF World Tour, since 2018 it became one of only four tournaments to be granted Super 1000 level.

== Sponsorships ==
- Pelita Jaya (1987–1988)
- Pelita Khatulistiwa (1989)
- Pelita Mahakam (1990)
- Indocement Pelita Parahyangan (1991)
- 555 (1992)
- Indomie (1993)
- RCTI (1994)
- Sony (1995–1997)
- Sanyo (Sanyo Indonesia Open, 1998–2003)
- Djarum (Djarum Indonesia Open, 2004–2013)
- BCA (BCA Indonesia Open, 2014–2017)
- Blibli (Blibli Indonesia Open, 2018–2019)
- SimInvest (SimInvest Indonesia Open, 2021)
- East Ventures (East Ventures Indonesia Open, 2022)
- Kapal Api (Kapal Api Group Indonesia Open, 2023–2025)
- Polytron (Polytron Indonesia Open, 2026)

== Venues and host cities ==
Below is the cities that have hosted the tournament. The tournament's current host city is Jakarta.

- 1982–1988, 1993, 1995, 1998, 2000–2001, 2004–2016, 2018–2019, 2022–2026: Istora Gelora Bung Karno, Jakarta
- 1989: Pontianak, West Kalimantan
- 1990: GOR Segiri, Samarinda, East Kalimantan
- 1991: Bandung, West Java
- 1992: GOR Jatidiri, Semarang, Central Java
- 1994: GOR Among Rogo, Yogyakarta, Special Region of Yogyakarta
- 1996: Medan, North Sumatra
- 1997: Surakarta, Central Java
- 1999: Denpasar, Bali
- 2002: GOR Kertajaya, Surabaya, East Java
- 2003: GOR Batam, Batam, Riau Islands
- 2017: Jakarta Convention Center, Jakarta
- 2021: Bali International Convention Center, Badung, Bali
Locations of Indonesia Masters host cities

== Past winners ==
Year	Men's singles	Women's singles	Men's doubles	Women's doubles	Mixed doubles	Ref
1982	(Indonesia) Icuk Sugiarto	(Indonesia) Verawaty Fadjrin	(Indonesia) Rudy Heryanto (Indonesia) Hariamanto Kartono	(England) Gillian Gilks (England) Gillian Clark	(England) Martin Dew (England) Gillian Gilks	
1983	(Indonesia) Liem Swie King	(Indonesia) Ivana Lie	(Indonesia) Rudy Heryanto (Indonesia) Hariamanto Kartono	(Indonesia) Ruth Damayanti (Indonesia) Maria Fransisca	(Indonesia) Christian Hadinata (Indonesia) Ivana Lie	
1984	(Indonesia) Lius Pongoh	(China) Li Lingwei	(Indonesia) Hadibowo (Indonesia) Christian Hadinata	(England) Nora Perry (England) Jane Webster	(Indonesia) Christian Hadinata (Indonesia) Ivana Lie	
1985	(China) Han Jian	(China) Li Lingwei	(Indonesia) Hariamanto Kartono (Indonesia) Liem Swie King	(China) Han Aiping (China) Li Lingwei	(England) Martin Dew (England) Gillian Gilks	
1986	(Indonesia) Icuk Sugiarto	(China) Shi Wen	(Indonesia) Hariamanto Kartono (Indonesia) Liem Swie King	(Indonesia) Verawaty Fadjrin (Indonesia) Ivana Lie	(Denmark) Steen Fladberg (England) Gillian Clark	
1987	(China) Yang Yang	(China) Li Lingwei	(Indonesia) Eddy Hartono (Indonesia) Liem Swie King	(Indonesia) Ivana Lie (Indonesia) Rosiana Tendean	(Denmark) Jan Paulsen (England) Gillian Gowers	
1988	(Indonesia) Icuk Sugiarto	(China) Li Lingwei	(Malaysia) Jalani Sidek (Malaysia) Razif Sidek	(Indonesia) Verawaty Fadjrin (Indonesia) Yanti Kusmiati	(Indonesia) Eddy Hartono (Indonesia) Erma Sulistianingsih	
1989	(China) Xiong Guobao	(Indonesia) Susi Susanti	(Indonesia) Rudy Gunawan (Indonesia) Eddy Hartono	(Indonesia) Erma Sulistianingsih (Indonesia) Rosiana Tendean	(Indonesia) Eddy Hartono (Indonesia) Verawaty Fadjrin	
1990	(Indonesia) Ardy Wiranata	(South Korea) Lee Young-suk	(Malaysia) Jalani Sidek (Malaysia) Razif Sidek	(South Korea) Chung Myung-hee (South Korea) Hwang Hye-young	(Indonesia) Rudy Gunawan (Indonesia) Rosiana Tendean	
1991	(Indonesia) Ardy Wiranata	(Indonesia) Susi Susanti	(South Korea) Kim Moon-soo (South Korea) Park Joo-bong	(South Korea) Chung Myung-hee (South Korea) Hwang Hye-young	(Denmark) Thomas Lund (Denmark) Pernille Dupont	
1992	(Indonesia) Ardy Wiranata	(China) Ye Zhaoying	(Indonesia) Rudy Gunawan (Indonesia) Eddy Hartono	(Indonesia) Erma Sulistianingsih (Indonesia) Rosiana Tendean	(Sweden) Pär-Gunnar Jönsson (Sweden) Maria Bengtsson	
1993	(Indonesia) Alan Budikusuma	(China) Ye Zhaoying	(Indonesia) Rexy Mainaky (Indonesia) Ricky Subagja	(Indonesia) Finarsih (Indonesia) Lili Tampi	(Indonesia) Rudy Gunawan (Indonesia) Rosiana Tendean	
1994	(Indonesia) Ardy Wiranata	(Indonesia) Susi Susanti	(Indonesia) Rexy Mainaky (Indonesia) Ricky Subagja	(Indonesia) Finarsih (Indonesia) Lili Tampi	(China) Jiang Xin (China) Zhang Jin	
1995	(Indonesia) Ardy Wiranata	(Indonesia) Susi Susanti	(Indonesia) Rudy Gunawan (Indonesia) Bambang Suprianto	(China) Ge Fei (China) Gu Jun	(Indonesia) Tri Kusharjanto (Indonesia) Minarti Timur	
1996	(Indonesia) Joko Suprianto	(Indonesia) Susi Susanti	(Indonesia) Antonius Ariantho (Indonesia) Denny Kantono	(Indonesia) Eliza Nathanael (Indonesia) Zelin Resiana	(Indonesia) Tri Kusharjanto (Indonesia) Minarti Timur	
1997	(Indonesia) Ardy Wiranata	(Indonesia) Susi Susanti	(Indonesia) Sigit Budiarto (Indonesia) Candra Wijaya	(Indonesia) Eliza Nathanael (Indonesia) Zelin Resiana	(Indonesia) Tri Kusharjanto (Indonesia) Minarti Timur	
1998	(Malaysia) Yong Hock Kin	(Indonesia) Mia Audina	(Indonesia) Rexy Mainaky (Indonesia) Ricky Subagja	(Indonesia) Deyana Lomban (Indonesia) Eliza Nathanael	(Indonesia) Tri Kusharjanto (Indonesia) Minarti Timur	
1999	(Indonesia) Taufik Hidayat	(Indonesia) Lidya Djaelawijaya	(Indonesia) Rexy Mainaky (Indonesia) Ricky Subagja	(Denmark) Helene Kirkegaard (Denmark) Rikke Olsen	(Indonesia) Tri Kusharjanto (Indonesia) Minarti Timur	
2000	(Indonesia) Taufik Hidayat	(Denmark) Camilla Martin	(Indonesia) Tony Gunawan (Indonesia) Candra Wijaya	(England) Joanne Goode (England) Donna Kellogg	(England) Simon Archer (England) Joanne Goode	
2001	(Indonesia) Marleve Mainaky	(Indonesia) Ellen Angelina	(Indonesia) Sigit Budiarto (Indonesia) Candra Wijaya	(Indonesia) Deyana Lomban (Indonesia) Vita Marissa	(Indonesia) Tri Kusharjanto (Indonesia) Emma Ermawati	
2002	(Indonesia) Taufik Hidayat	(China) Gong Ruina	(South Korea) Lee Dong-soo (South Korea) Yoo Yong-sung	(China) Gao Ling (China) Huang Sui	(Indonesia) Bambang Suprianto (Indonesia) Minarti Timur	
2003	(Indonesia) Taufik Hidayat	(China) Xie Xingfang	(China) Sang Yang (China) Zheng Bo	(China) Gao Ling (China) Huang Sui	(South Korea) Kim Dong-moon (South Korea) Ra Kyung-min	
2004	(Indonesia) Taufik Hidayat	(China) Xie Xingfang	(Indonesia) Luluk Hadiyanto (Indonesia) Alvent Yulianto	(China) Yang Wei (China) Zhang Jiewen	(China) Zhang Jun (China) Gao Ling	
2005	(South Korea) Lee Hyun-il	(Hong Kong) Wang Chen	(Indonesia) Markis Kido (Indonesia) Hendra Setiawan	(South Korea) Lee Hyo-jung (South Korea) Lee Kyung-won	(Indonesia) Nova Widianto (Indonesia) Liliyana Natsir	
2006	(Indonesia) Taufik Hidayat	(China) Zhu Lin	(United States) Tony Gunawan (Indonesia) Candra Wijaya	(China) Wei Yili (China) Zhang Yawen	(China) Xie Zhongbo (China) Zhang Yawen	
2007	(Malaysia) Lee Chong Wei	(Hong Kong) Wang Chen	(China) Cai Yun (China) Fu Haifeng	(China) Du Jing (China) Yu Yang	(China) Zheng Bo (China) Gao Ling	
2008	(Indonesia) Sony Dwi Kuncoro	(China) Zhu Lin	(Malaysia) Mohd Zakry Abdul Latif (Malaysia) Mohd Fairuzizuan Mohd Tazari	(Indonesia) Vita Marissa (Indonesia) Liliyana Natsir	(China) Zheng Bo (China) Gao Ling	
2009	(Malaysia) Lee Chong Wei	(India) Saina Nehwal	(South Korea) Jung Jae-sung (South Korea) Lee Yong-dae	(Malaysia) Chin Eei Hui (Malaysia) Wong Pei Tty	(China) Zheng Bo (China) Ma Jin	
2010	(Malaysia) Lee Chong Wei	(India) Saina Nehwal	(Chinese Taipei) Fang Chieh-min (Chinese Taipei) Lee Sheng-mu	(South Korea) Kim Min-jung (South Korea) Lee Hyo-jung	(Poland) Robert Mateusiak (Poland) Nadieżda Kostiuczyk	
2011	(Malaysia) Lee Chong Wei	(China) Wang Yihan	(China) Cai Yun (China) Fu Haifeng	(China) Wang Xiaoli (China) Yu Yang	(China) Zhang Nan (China) Zhao Yunlei	
2012	(Indonesia) Simon Santoso	(India) Saina Nehwal	(South Korea) Jung Jae-sung (South Korea) Lee Yong-dae	(China) Wang Xiaoli (China) Yu Yang	(Thailand) Sudket Prapakamol (Thailand) Saralee Thungthongkam	
2013	(Malaysia) Lee Chong Wei	(China) Li Xuerui	(Indonesia) Mohammad Ahsan (Indonesia) Hendra Setiawan	(China) Bao Yixin (China) Cheng Shu	(China) Zhang Nan (China) Zhao Yunlei	
2014	(Denmark) Jan Ø. Jørgensen	(China) Li Xuerui	(South Korea) Lee Yong-dae (South Korea) Yoo Yeon-seong	(China) Tian Qing (China) Zhao Yunlei	(Denmark) Joachim Fischer Nielsen (Denmark) Christinna Pedersen	
2015	(Japan) Kento Momota	(Thailand) Ratchanok Intanon	(South Korea) Ko Sung-hyun (South Korea) Shin Baek-cheol	(China) Tang Jinhua (China) Tian Qing	(China) Xu Chen (China) Ma Jin	
2016	(Malaysia) Lee Chong Wei	(Chinese Taipei) Tai Tzu-ying	(South Korea) Lee Yong-dae (South Korea) Yoo Yeon-seong	(Japan) Misaki Matsutomo (Japan) Ayaka Takahashi	(China) Xu Chen (China) Ma Jin	
2017	(India) Srikanth Kidambi	(Japan) Sayaka Sato	(China) Li Junhui (China) Liu Yuchen	(China) Chen Qingchen (China) Jia Yifan	(Indonesia) Tontowi Ahmad (Indonesia) Liliyana Natsir	
2018	(Japan) Kento Momota	(Chinese Taipei) Tai Tzu-ying	(Indonesia) Marcus Fernaldi Gideon (Indonesia) Kevin Sanjaya Sukamuljo	(Japan) Yuki Fukushima (Japan) Sayaka Hirota	(Indonesia) Tontowi Ahmad (Indonesia) Liliyana Natsir	
2019	(Chinese Taipei) Chou Tien-chen	(Japan) Akane Yamaguchi	(Indonesia) Marcus Fernaldi Gideon (Indonesia) Kevin Sanjaya Sukamuljo	(Japan) Yuki Fukushima (Japan) Sayaka Hirota	(China) Zheng Siwei (China) Huang Yaqiong	
2020	Cancelled (Note: This tournament, originally to be played from 17 to 22 November, was later cancelled due to the COVID-19 pandemic in Indonesia.)					
2021	(Denmark) Viktor Axelsen	(South Korea) An Se-young	(Indonesia) Marcus Fernaldi Gideon (Indonesia) Kevin Sanjaya Sukamuljo	(Japan) Nami Matsuyama (Japan) Chiharu Shida	(Thailand) Dechapol Puavaranukroh (Thailand) Sapsiree Taerattanachai	
2022	(Denmark) Viktor Axelsen	(Chinese Taipei) Tai Tzu-ying	(China) Liu Yuchen (China) Ou Xuanyi	(Japan) Nami Matsuyama (Japan) Chiharu Shida	(China) Zheng Siwei (China) Huang Yaqiong	
2023	(Denmark) Viktor Axelsen	(China) Chen Yufei	(India) Satwiksairaj Rankireddy (India) Chirag Shetty	(South Korea) Baek Ha-na (South Korea) Lee So-hee	(China) Zheng Siwei (China) Huang Yaqiong	
2024	(China) Shi Yuqi	(China) Chen Yufei	(China) Liang Weikeng (China) Wang Chang	(South Korea) Baek Ha-na (South Korea) Lee So-hee	(China) Jiang Zhenbang (China) Wei Yaxin	
2025	(Denmark) Anders Antonsen	(South Korea) An Se-young	(South Korea) Kim Won-ho (South Korea) Seo Seung-jae	(China) Liu Shengshu (China) Tan Ning	(France) Thom Gicquel (France) Delphine Delrue	
2026	(Canada) Victor Lai	(South Korea) An Se-young	(Malaysia) Goh Sze Fei (Malaysia) Nur Izzuddin	(Japan) Yuki Fukushima (Japan) Mayu Matsumoto	(Denmark) Mathias Christiansen (Denmark) Alexandra Bøje	

== Multiple winners ==
Below is the list of the most successful players in the Indonesia Open:

Name	MS	WS	MD	WD	XD	Total
(Indonesia) Ardy Wiranata	6					6
(Indonesia) Tri Kusharjanto					6	6
(Indonesia) Minarti Timur					6	6
(Indonesia) Taufik Hidayat	6					6
(Indonesia) Susi Susanti		6				6
(Malaysia) Lee Chong Wei	6					6
(Indonesia) Ivana Lie		1		2	2	5
(China) Li Lingwei		4		1		5
(Indonesia) Eddy Hartono			3		2	5
(Indonesia) Rosiana Tendean				3	2	5
(Indonesia) Rudy Gunawan			3		2	5
(China) Gao Ling				2	3	5
(Indonesia) Hariamanto Kartono			4			4
(Indonesia) Liem Swie King	1		3			4
(Indonesia) Verawaty Fadjrin		1		2	1	4
(Indonesia) Ricky Subagja			4			4
(Indonesia) Rexy Mainaky			4			4
(Indonesia) Candra Wijaya			4			4
(China) Zheng Bo			1		3	4
(South Korea) Lee Yong-dae			4			4
(Indonesia) Liliyana Natsir				1	3	4
(Indonesia) Christian Hadinata			1		2	3
(England) Gillian Gilks				1	2	3
(Indonesia) Icuk Sugiarto	3					3
(Indonesia) Erma Sulistianingsih				2	1	3
(Indonesia) Eliza Nathanael				3		3
(Indonesia) Marcus Fernaldi Gideon			3			3
(Indonesia) Kevin Sanjaya Sukamuljo			3			3
(China) Yu Yang				3		3
(India) Saina Nehwal		3				3
(China) Zhao Yunlei				1	2	3
(China) Ma Jin					3	3
(Chinese Taipei) Tai Tzu-ying		3				3
(China) Zheng Siwei					3	3
(China) Huang Yaqiong					3	3
(Denmark) Viktor Axelsen	3					3
(South Korea) An Se-young		3				3
(Japan) Yuki Fukushima				3		3
(Indonesia) Rudy Heryanto			2			2
(England) Martin Dew					2	2
(England) Gillian Clark				1	1	2
(Malaysia) Jalani Sidek			2			2
(Malaysia) Razif Sidek			2			2
(South Korea) Chung Myung-hee				2		2
(South Korea) Hwang Hye-young				2		2
(China) Ye Zhaoying		2				2
(Indonesia) Finarsih				2		2
(Indonesia) Lili Tampi				2		2
(Indonesia) Zelin Resiana				2		2
(England) Joanne Goode				1	1	2
(Indonesia) Sigit Budiarto			2			2
(Indonesia) Deyana Lomban				2		2
(Indonesia) Bambang Suprianto			1		1	2
(China) Huang Sui				2		2
(China) Xie Xingfang		2				2
(Indonesia) (United States) Tony Gunawan			2			2
(China) Zhang Yawen				1	1	2
(Hong Kong) Wang Chen		2				2
(Indonesia) Vita Marissa				2		2
(China) Zhu Lin		2				2
(South Korea) Lee Hyo-jung				2		2
(China) Cai Yun			2			2
(China) Fu Haifeng			2			2
(South Korea) Jung Jae-sung			2			2
(China) Wang Xiaoli				2		2
(Indonesia) Hendra Setiawan			2			2
(China) Zhang Nan					2	2
(China) Li Xuerui		2				2
(China) Tian Qing				2		2
(South Korea) Yoo Yeon-seong			2			2
(China) Xu Chen					2	2
(Indonesia) Tontowi Ahmad					2	2
(Japan) Kento Momota	2					2
(Japan) Sayaka Hirota				2		2
(Japan) Nami Matsuyama				2		2
(Japan) Chiharu Shida				2		2
(China) Liu Yuchen			2			2
(South Korea) Baek Ha-na				2		2
(South Korea) Lee So-hee				2		2
(China) Chen Yufei		2				2

^1 – Tony Gunawan won one title representing Indonesia and one with the United States

== Performances by nation ==
As of the 2026 edition

Pos	Nation	MS	WS	MD	WD	XD	Total
1	Indonesia	22	10	23.5	13	16	84.5
2	China	4	18	6	14	14	56
3	South Korea	1	4	8	6	1	20
4	Malaysia	7		4	1		12
5	Denmark	5	1		1	4	11
6	Japan	2	2		6		10
7	England				3	4	7
8	Chinese Taipei	1	3	1			5
8	India	1	3	1			5
10	Thailand		1			2	3
11	Hong Kong		2				2
12	Canada	1					1
12	France					1	1
12	Poland					1	1
12	Sweden					1	1
16	United States			0.5			0.5
	Total	44	44	44	44	44	220

== See also ==
- Indonesia Masters
- Indonesia Masters Super 100
- Indonesia International
