= 1992 Thomas Cup group stage =

Badminton team Tournament in Kuala Lumpur

The 1992 Thomas Cup group stage was held at Stadium Negara in Kuala Lumpur, Malaysia, from 5 to 10 May 1992.

The group stage was first stage of the tournament where only the two highest-placing teams in each of the two groups advanced to the knockout stage.

== Draw ==
The original draw for the tournament was conducted on 13 March 1992. The 8 teams will be drawn into two groups each containing four teams.

=== Group composition ===
Group
Group A	Group B
China; Indonesia; Sweden; Thailand	Denmark; England; South Korea; Malaysia (Host)

== Group A ==
Pos	Team	Pld	W	L	GF	GA	GD	PF	PA	PD	Pts	Qualification
1	China	3	3	0	30	1	+29	467	214	+253	3	Advance to semi-finals
2	Indonesia	3	2	1	18	14	+4	374	305	+69	2	Advance to semi-finals
3	Sweden	3	1	2	11	25	−14	347	486	−139	1	
4	Thailand	3	0	3	8	27	−19	289	472	−183	0	

Source: The Straits Times

=== Indonesia vs Sweden ===
Indonesia
4
Stadium Negara
5 May 1992, 19:00 UTC+8

Sweden
1

			1	2	3
1	(Indonesia) (Sweden)	Ardy Wiranata; Jens Olsson	15; 17	15; 1	8; 15
2	(Indonesia) (Sweden)	Rudy Gunawan / Eddy Hartono; Pär-Gunnar Jönsson / Stellan Österberg	15; 3	15; 5
3	(Indonesia) (Sweden)	Alan Budikusuma; Patrik Andreasson	18; 15	15; 2
4	(Indonesia) (Sweden)	Rexy Mainaky / Ricky Subagja; Peter Axelsson / Mikael Rosén	15; 6	15; 7
5	(Indonesia) (Sweden)	Hermawan Susanto; Rickard Magnusson	15; 5	15; 10

=== China vs Thailand ===
China
5
Stadium Negara
6 May 1992, 19:00 UTC+8

Thailand
0

			1	2	3
1	(China) (Thailand)	Zhao Jianhua; Sompol Kukasemkij	15; 9	15; 2
2	(China) (Thailand)	Wu Wenkai; Teeranun Chiangta	15; 5	15; 12
3	(China) (Thailand)	Liu Jun; Surachai Makkasasithorn	15; 4	15; 6
4	(China) (Thailand)	Li Yongbo / Tian Bingyi; Siripong Siripool / Pramote Teerawiwatana	15; 13	15; 6
5	(China) (Thailand)	Huang Zhanzhong / Zheng Yumin; Narin Rungbanapan / Narong Rungbanapan	15; 0	15; 5

=== Indonesia vs Thailand ===
Indonesia
4
Stadium Negara
7 May 1992, 19:00 UTC+8

Thailand
1

			1	2	3
1	(Indonesia) (Thailand)	Ardy Wiranata; Sompol Kukasemkij	15; 6	15; 4
2	(Indonesia) (Thailand)	Rudy Gunawan / Eddy Hartono; Pramote Teerawiwatana / Sakrapee Thongsari	16; 18	15; 8	3; 15
3	(Indonesia) (Thailand)	Alan Budikusuma; Teeranun Chiangta	15; 3	15; 1
4	(Indonesia) (Thailand)	Rexy Mainaky / Ricky Subagja; Narin Rungbanapan / Narong Rungbanapan	15; 2	15; 9
5	(Indonesia) (Thailand)	Joko Suprianto; Pulsak Thewarangsee	15; 0	15; 1

=== China vs Sweden ===
China
5
Stadium Negara
8 May 1992, 19:00 UTC+8

Sweden
0

			1	2	3
1	(China) (Sweden)	Zhao Jianhua; Jens Olsson	15; 6	15; 7
2	(China) (Sweden)	Li Yongbo / Tian Bingyi; Peter Axelsson / Pär-Gunnar Jönsson	15; 6	15; 6
3	(China) (Sweden)	Wu Wenkai; Patrik Andreasson	15; 8	15; 10
4	(China) (Sweden)	Huang Zhanzhong / Zheng Yumin; Stellan Österberg / Mikael Rosén	15; 7	15; 9
5	(China) (Sweden)	Liu Jun; Rickard Magnusson	15; 3	15; 18	15; 13

=== Thailand vs Sweden ===
Thailand
2
Stadium Negara
9 May 1992, 19:00 UTC+8

Sweden
3

			1	2	3
1	(Thailand) (Sweden)	Sompol Kukasemkij; Jens Olsson	15; 10	10; 15	4; 15
2	(Thailand) (Sweden)	Pramote Teerawiwatana / Sakrapee Thongsari; Peter Axelsson / Pär-Gunnar Jönsson	15; 12	8; 15	12; 15
3	(Thailand) (Sweden)	Teeranun Chiangta; Patrik Andreasson	3; 15	15; 2	17; 15
4	(Thailand) (Sweden)	Sompol Kukasemkij / Siripong Siripool; Stellan Österberg / Mikael Rosén	9; 15	11; 15
5	(Thailand) (Sweden)	Surachai Makkasasithorn; Rickard Magnusson	11; 15	15; 6	15; 3

=== China vs Indonesia ===
China
5
Stadium Negara
10 May 1992, 19:00 UTC+8

Indonesia
0

			1	2	3
1	(China) (Indonesia)	Wu Wenkai; Ricky Subagja	15; 4	15; 3
2	(China) (Indonesia)	Liu Jun; Rexy Mainaky	15; 1	15; 4
3	(China) (Indonesia)	Wan Zhengwen; Bagus Setiadi	15; 2	15; 4
4	(China) (Indonesia)	Chen Hongyong / Li Yongbo; Alan Budikusuma / Rexy Mainaky	17; 14	15; 4
5	(China) (Indonesia)	Huang Zhanzhong / Zheng Yumin; Ricky Subagja / Hermawan Susanto	15; 13	15; 10

== Group B ==
Pos	Team	Pld	W	L	GF	GA	GD	PF	PA	PD	Pts	Qualification
1	South Korea	3	3	0	18	16	+2	389	360	+29	3	Advance to semi-finals
2	Malaysia (H)	3	2	1	26	7	+19	467	298	+169	2	Advance to semi-finals
3	England	3	1	2	11	24	−13	335	462	−127	1	
4	Denmark	3	0	3	12	20	−8	330	401	−71	0	

Source: The Straits Times
(H) Host

=== Malaysia vs England ===
Malaysia
5
Stadium Negara
5 May 1992, 19:00 UTC+8

England
0

			1	2	3
1	(Malaysia) (England)	Rashid Sidek; Darren Hall	15; 5	15; 4
2	(Malaysia) (England)	Jalani Sidek / Razif Sidek; Nick Ponting / David Wright	17; 14	15; 4
3	(Malaysia) (England)	Foo Kok Keong; Anders Nielsen	15; 3	15; 6
4	(Malaysia) (England)	Cheah Soon Kit / Soo Beng Kiang; Andy Goode / Chris Hunt	15; 7	13; 18	15; 12
5	(Malaysia) (England)	Kwan Yoke Meng; Peter Knowles	17; 16	15; 1

=== South Korea vs Denmark ===
South Korea
2
Stadium Negara
6 May 1992, 19:00 UTC+8

Denmark
3

			1	2	3
1	(South Korea) (Denmark)	Lee Gwang-jin; Poul-Erik Høyer Larsen	6; 15	8; 15
2	(South Korea) (Denmark)	Park Sung-woo; Peter Espersen	15; 3	15; 6
3	(South Korea) (Denmark)	Ahn Jae-chang; Thomas Stuer-Lauridsen	4; 15	1; 15
4	(South Korea) (Denmark)	Kim Moon-soo / Park Joo-bong; Jan Paulsen / Henrik Svarrer	15; 4	15; 4
5	(South Korea) (Denmark)	Lee Sang-bok / Shon Jin-hwan; Max Gandrup / Thomas Lund	17; 18	10; 15

=== Malaysia vs South Korea ===
Malaysia
2
Stadium Negara
7 May 1992, 19:00 UTC+8

South Korea
3

			1	2	3
1	(Malaysia) (South Korea)	Rashid Sidek; Lee Gwang-jin	15; 7	15; 3
2	(Malaysia) (South Korea)	Jalani Sidek / Razif Sidek; Kim Moon-soo / Park Joo-bong	11; 15	12; 15
3	(Malaysia) (South Korea)	Foo Kok Keong; Kim Hak-kyun	15; 10	15; 5
4	(Malaysia) (South Korea)	Cheah Soon Kit / Soo Beng Kiang; Lee Gwang-jin / Shon Jin-hwan	15; 6	11; 15	8; 15
5	(Malaysia) (South Korea)	Kwan Yoke Meng; Park Sung-woo	6; 15	15; 6	6; 15

=== Denmark vs England ===
Denmark
2
Stadium Negara
8 May 1992, 19:00 UTC+8

England
3

			1	2	3
1	(Denmark) (England)	Poul-Erik Høyer Larsen; Darren Hall	12; 15	5; 15
2	(Denmark) (England)	Jan Paulsen / Henrik Svarrer; Nick Ponting / David Wright	10; 15	15; 12	6; 15
3	(Denmark) (England)	Thomas Stuer-Lauridsen; Anders Nielsen	15; 8	15; 6
4	(Denmark) (England)	Max Gandrup / Thomas Lund; Andy Goode / Chris Hunt	15; 11	15; 5
5	(Denmark) (England)	Peter Espersen; Peter Smith	8; 15	15; 7	8; 15

=== South Korea vs England ===
South Korea
4
Stadium Negara
9 May 1992, 19:00 UTC+8

England
1

			1	2	3
1	(South Korea) (England)	Lee Gwang-jin; Darren Hall	9; 15	3; 15
2	(South Korea) (England)	Kim Moon-soo / Park Joo-bong; Nick Ponting / David Wright	15; 18	15; 6	15; 3
3	(South Korea) (England)	Ahn Jae-chang; Anders Nielsen	15; 9	9; 15	15; 3
4	(South Korea) (England)	Lee Sang-bok / Shon Jin-hwan; Andy Goode / Chris Hunt	15; 7	15; 6
5	(South Korea) (England)	Park Sung-woo; Peter Knowles	15; 4	15; 5

=== Malaysia vs Denmark ===
Malaysia
5
Stadium Negara
10 May 1992, 19:00 UTC+8

Denmark
0

			1	2	3
1	(Malaysia) (Denmark)	Rashid Sidek; Poul-Erik Høyer Larsen	15; 12	15; 2
2	(Malaysia) (Denmark)	Jalani Sidek / Razif Sidek; Jan Paulsen / Henrik Svarrer	15; 5	15; 0
3	(Malaysia) (Denmark)	Foo Kok Keong; Thomas Stuer-Lauridsen	18; 14	15; 12
4	(Malaysia) (Denmark)	Cheah Soon Kit / Soo Beng Kiang; Max Gandrup / Thomas Lund	18; 14	15; 8
5	(Malaysia) (Denmark)	Kwan Yoke Meng; Michael Søgaard	15; 6	15; 8
