= 1992 Thomas Cup knockout stage =

Badminton championships

The knockout stage for the 1992 Thomas Cup in Kuala Lumpur, Malaysia began on 12 May 1992 with the semi-finals and ended on 16 May 1992 with the final.

== Qualified teams ==
The top two placed teams from each of the two groups qualified for this stage.

Group	Winners	Runners-up
A	China	Indonesia
B	South Korea	Malaysia

== Bracket ==
Semi-finals
China	2
Malaysia	3
Indonesia	5
South Korea	0

Final
Malaysia	3
Indonesia	2

== Semi-finals ==
=== Semi-final 1 ===
China
2
Stadium Negara
12 May 1992, 19:00 UTC+8

Malaysia
3

			1	2	3
1	(China) (Malaysia)	Zhao Jianhua; Rashid Sidek	14; 18	15; 10	12; 15
2	(China) (Malaysia)	Li Yongbo / Tian Bingyi; Jalani Sidek / Razif Sidek	15; 5	10; 15	5; 15
3	(China) (Malaysia)	Wu Wenkai; Foo Kok Keong	15; 11	15; 8
4	(China) (Malaysia)	Huang Zhanzhong / Zheng Yumin; Cheah Soon Kit / Soo Beng Kiang	9; 15	14; 18
5	(China) (Malaysia)	Liu Jun; Kwan Yoke Meng	15; 12	15; 13

=== Semi-final 2 ===
Indonesia
5
Stadium Negara
13 May 1992, 19:00 UTC+8

South Korea
0

			1	2	3
1	(Indonesia) (South Korea)	Ardy Wiranata; Kim Hak-kyun	17; 15	15; 4
2	(Indonesia) (South Korea)	Eddy Hartono / Rudy Gunawan; Park Joo-bong / Lee Sang-bok	18; 17	15; 4
3	(Indonesia) (South Korea)	Alan Budikusuma; Ahn Jae-chang	17; 15	15; 3
4	(Indonesia) (South Korea)	Ricky Subagja / Rexy Mainaky; Shon Jin-hwan / Lee Gwang-jin	15; 6	15; 2
5	(Indonesia) (South Korea)	Joko Suprianto; Park Sung-woo	15; 3	15; 5

== Final ==
Indonesia
2
Stadium Negara
16 May 1992, 19:00 UTC+8

Malaysia
3

			1	2	3
1	(Indonesia) (Malaysia)	Ardy Wiranata; Rashid Sidek	11; 15	15; 10	4; 15
2	(Indonesia) (Malaysia)	Rudy Gunawan / Eddy Hartono; Razif Sidek / Jalani Sidek	15; 9	9; 15	15; 3
3	(Indonesia) (Malaysia)	Alan Budikusuma; Foo Kok Keong	6; 15	12; 15
4	(Indonesia) (Malaysia)	Ricky Subagja / Rexy Mainaky; Cheah Soon Kit / Soo Beng Kiang	12; 15	15; 10	8; 15
5	(Indonesia) (Malaysia)	Joko Supriyanto; Kwan Yoke Meng	15; 3	15; 7
