= 1991 IBF World Championships – Men's singles =

Badminton championships

Men's singles at the 1991 IBF World Championships
- Venue: Brøndby Arena
- Location: Copenhagen, Denmark
- Dates: May 2, 1991 – May 8, 1991

Medalists
gold medal	Zhao Jianhua	China
silver medal	Alan Budikusuma	Indonesia
bronze medal	Ardy Wiranata	Indonesia
bronze medal	Liu Jun	China

The 1991 IBF World Championships (World Badminton Championships) were held in Copenhagen, Denmark in 1991. Following the results of the men's singles.

== Main stage ==
=== Section 1 ===
First Round
(South Korea) Kim H-k	15	15
(Poland) P Mazur	2	6
(Cyprus) N Pissis	15	3	6
(Spain) A Miranda	13	15	15

Second Round
(Indonesia) A Wiranata	15	15
(Germany) M Keck	7	1
(Malta) K Vella	w	/	o
(Canada) B Blanshard
(Austria) H Fischer	15	15
(Belgium) F Vigneron	10	5
(South Korea) Kim H-k	15	15
(Spain) A Miranda	1	1

Third Round
(Indonesia) A Wiranata	15	15
(Malta) K Vella	6	4
(Austria) H Fischer	9	5
(South Korea) Kim H-k	15	15

Fourth Round
(Indonesia) A Wiranata	15	15
(South Korea) Kim H-k	2	9

=== Section 2 ===
First Round
(China) Yu LZ	15	16	15
(India) R Bagga	10	17	12
(Switzerland) J Rodriguez	12	12
(Finland) J Eriksson	15	15

Second Round
(Malaysia) R Sidek	15	9	15
(England) P J. Bush	2	15	10
(Netherlands) E van Dalm	15	15
(Mauritius) G Allet	2	7
(Sweden) J Tuvesson	15	15
(Zimbabwe) K van Breda	0	0
(China) Yu LZ	15	15
(Finland) J Eriksson	3	1

Third Round
(Malaysia) R Sidek	15	15
(Netherlands) E van Dalm	1	5
(Sweden) J Tuvesson	11	4
(China) Yu LZ	15	15

Fourth Round
(Malaysia) R Sidek	10	7
(China) Yu LZ	15	15

=== Section 3 ===
First Round
(North Korea) Ri N-c	15	15
(Tanzania) P Somani	2	8
(United States) J Britton	w	/	o
(Pakistan) M Ali Yar Beg

Second Round
(Denmark) M Frost	9	15	10
(Russia) A Antropov	15	1	15
(Finland) J Aalto	8	6
(Japan) H Motoyama	15	15
(Nigeria) D Fatauchi
(New Zealand) G Stewart	w	/	o
(North Korea) Ri N-c	w	/	o
(United States) J Britton

Third Round
(Russia) A Antropov	15	15
(Japan) H Motoyama	3	9
(New Zealand) G Stewart	15	15
(North Korea) Ri N-c	6	3

Fourth Round
(Russia) A Antropov	15	15
(New Zealand) G Stewart	5	10

=== Section 4 ===
First Round
(Sweden) P Andreasson	15	15
(Switzerland) H Mueller	2	6
(Hong Kong) Chan K N	15	15
(France) S Renault	4	6

Second Round
(England) D Hall	15	15
(Norway) Ø Berntsen	3	3
(Republic of Ireland) G Henderson	11	8
(Canada) A Muir	15	15
(Australia) D McDonald	4	13
(Iceland) B Kristjánsson	15	18
(Sweden) P Andreasson	15	15
(Hong Kong) Chan K N	6	6

Third Round
(England) D Hall	15	15
(Canada) A Muir	8	2
(Iceland) B Kristjánsson	5	6
(Sweden) P Andreasson	15	15

Fourth Round
(England) D Hall	15	15
(Sweden) P Andreasson	7	3

=== Section 5 ===
First Round
(Malta) M Farrugia	3	2
(Romania) F Balaban	15	15
(Thailand) V Khamthong	8	7
(Sweden) J Olsson	15	15

Second Round
(China) Zhao JH	15	15
(Australia) P Stevenson	11	11
(Chinese Taipei) Liu E-h	10	15	15
(India) S Bakshi	15	3	6
(Nigeria) T Gibson
(Canada) Wen W	w	/	o
(Romania) F Balaban	3	0
(Sweden) J Olsson	15	15

Third Round
(China) Zhao JH	15	15
(Chinese Taipei) Liu E-h	6	8
(Canada) Wen W	8	13
(Sweden) J Olsson	15	15

Fourth Round
(China) Zhao JH	15	15
(Sweden) J Olsson	9	12

=== Section 6 ===
First Round
(Malaysia) Kwan Y M	15	15
(Norway) Ø Larsen	8	3
(France) J-F Massias	18	18
(Bulgaria) Y Borisov	15	15

Second Round
(Indonesia) H Susanto	w	/	o
(Nepal) R B. Shrestha
(Netherlands) C Bruil	15	15
(Greece) P Charalambidis	9	11
(Austria) T Farooq	7	8
(Denmark) C Thomsen	15	15
(Malaysia) Kwan Y M	15	15
(France) J-F Massias	1	7

Third Round
(Indonesia) H Susanto	15	15
(Netherlands) C Bruil	10	11
(Denmark) C Thomsen	15	15
(Malaysia) Kwan Y M	12	4

Fourth Round
(Indonesia) H Susanto	15	15
(Denmark) C Thomsen	5	5

=== Section 7 ===
First Round
(United States) C Jogis	15	10	15
(Germany) D Poste	12	15	8
(Mexico) E de la Torre Saavedra	w	/	o
(Pakistan) M S Majeed

Second Round
(Chinese Taipei) F Permadi	15	15
(China) Chen R	5	5
(England) S P. Butler	15	15
(Mauritius) G Dussain	3	1
(Norway) H Sperre Jr.	18	18
(Switzerland) C Nyffenegger	13	14
(United States) C Jogis	15	15
(Mexico) E de la Torre Saavedra	9	9

Third Round
(Chinese Taipei) F Permadi	4	15	15
(England) S P. Butler	15	10	11
(Norway) H Sperre Jr.	15	15
(United States) C Jogis	4	6

Fourth Round
(Chinese Taipei) F Permadi	18	15
(Norway) H Sperre Jr.	15	12

=== Section 8 ===
First Round
(Belgium) Y de Negri	6	2
(Czech Republic) T Mendrek	15	15
(Japan) F Machida	17	15
(Russia) N Zuyev	15	8

Second Round
(Denmark) T Stuer-Lauridsen	15	15
(Finland) R Liljequist	13	7
(Netherlands) A Meijer	10	5
(New Zealand) D Galt	15	15
(Iceland) G Adolfsson	6	7
(South Korea) Ahn J-c	15	15
(Czech Republic) T Mendrek	1	15	8
(Japan) F Machida	15	13	15

Third Round
(Denmark) T Stuer-Lauridsen	15	15
(New Zealand) D Galt	3	0
(South Korea) Ahn J-c	15	15
(Japan) F Machida	6	8

Fourth Round
(Denmark) T Stuer-Lauridsen	15	18
(South Korea) Ahn J-c	6	15

=== Section 9 ===
First Round
(Austria) H Götschl	8	15	15
(North Korea) Ri Y-h	15	3	5
(Netherlands) P Pelupessy	9	15	15
(France) É Thobois	15	10	4
(Hong Kong) Wong W L	15	15
(Australia) P Blackburn	4	4

Second Round
(Austria) H Götschl	1	15
(Netherlands) P Pelupessy	18	15
(Hong Kong) Wong W L	15	15	6
(South Korea) Lee G-j	8	17	15
(Norway) B Larsen	15	17
(Scotland) K Scott	9	15
(Bulgaria) I Ivanov	13	4
(Indonesia) J Suprianto	18	15

Third Round
(Netherlands) P Pelupessy	8	15	14
(South Korea) Lee G-j	15	8	17
(Norway) B Larsen	3	8
(Indonesia) J Suprianto	15	15

Fourth Round
(South Korea) Lee G-j	15	7	8
(Indonesia) J Suprianto	9	15	15

=== Section 10 ===
First Round
(Canada) D Humble	13	8
(Poland) D Zięba	15	15
(United States) T Reidy	w	/	o
(Nigeria) S Odusola

Second Round
(Poland) D Zięba	13	15	15
(United States) T Reidy	18	6	10
(Mauritius) B Bhurtun
(Japan) H Eto	w	/	o
(England) A W. Nielsen	2	7
(Sweden) P Axelsson	15	15
(Finland) L Lindelöf	9	9
(Denmark) P-E Høyer Larsen	15	15

Third Round
(Poland) D Zięba	15	9
(Japan) H Eto	18	15
(Sweden) P Axelsson	12	5
(Denmark) P-E Høyer Larsen	15	15

Fourth Round
(Japan) H Eto	6	5
(Denmark) P-E Høyer Larsen	15	15

=== Section 11 ===
First Round
(Mauritius) J-M Duverge
(India) S Saxena	w	/	o
(Germany) S Kuhl	15	15
(Grenada) S Sylvester	2	1

Second Round
(India) S Saxena	15	15
(Germany) S Kuhl	8	9
(Belgium) P Vanneste	15	15
(Zimbabwe) M Ravizzotti	1	2
(Switzerland) R Matthey de l'Etang	0	8
(Kazakhstan) I Dmitriev	15	'15
(Norway) E Lia	3	3
(China) Liu J	15	15

Third Round
(India) S Saxena	15	10	17
(Belgium) P Vanneste	4	15	14
(Kazakhstan) I Dmitriev	6	13
(China) Liu J	15	15

Fourth Round
(India) S Saxena	2	2
(China) Liu J	15	15

=== Section 12 ===
First Round
(Malta) S Spiteri	2	6
(Austria) J Koch	15	15
(Canada) I Sydie	w	/	o
(Nepal) P D Rana

Second Round
(Austria) J Koch	6	8
(Canada) I Sydie	15	15
(Guatemala) K Erichsen	5	9
(Chinese Taipei) Lee M-c	15	15
(New Zealand) K Harrison	15	15
(Spain) B Galmes	3	2
(Mexico) F de la Torre Saavedra	3	2
(Malaysia) Foo K K	15	15

Third Round
(Canada) I Sydie	10	6
(Chinese Taipei) Lee M-c	15	15
(New Zealand) K Harrison	10	5
(Malaysia) Foo K K	15	15

Fourth Round
(Chinese Taipei) Lee M-c	11	9
(Malaysia) Foo K K	15	15

=== Section 13 ===
First Round
(Denmark) I Frederiksen	18	15
(Finland) P Jäntti	15	7
(Chinese Taipei) Wei Y	15	15
(Russia) P Uvarov	12	2

Second Round
(Denmark) I Frederiksen	15	15
(Chinese Taipei) Wei Y	6	3
(Germany) K Mitteldorf	15	15
(Italy) A Klotzner	6	4
(Pakistan) I Amir
(United States) B Lee	w	/	o
(Bulgaria) B Lalov	3	7
(Thailand) S Kukasemkij	15	15

Third Round
(Denmark) I Frederiksen	15	15
(Germany) K Mitteldorf	8	3
(United States) B Lee	6	1
(Thailand) S Kukasemkij	15	15

Fourth Round
(Denmark) I Frederiksen	5	15	9
(Thailand) S Kukasemkij	15	4	15

=== Section 14 ===
First Round
(India) G Thomas	15	15
(Belgium) S Cognie	0	3
(France) F Panel	3	10
(New Zealand) N Hall	15	15

Second Round
(India) G Thomas	17	15
(New Zealand) N Hall	14	3
(Nigeria) O Onazi
(China) Wan ZW	w	/	o
(Hong Kong) Tse B	11	12
(Sweden) J Herrgardh	15	15
(Malta) D Cole	1	1
(Indonesia) A Budikusuma	15	15

Third Round
(India) G Thomas	11	9
(China) Wan ZW	15	15
(Sweden) J Herrgardh	6	6
(Indonesia) A Budikusuma	15	15

Fourth Round
(China) Wan ZW	6	6
(Indonesia) A Budikusuma	15	15

=== Section 15 ===
First Round
(Canada) J Dawson	15	15
(Norway) T Wåland	6	7
(Germany) G Schänzler	15	15
(Czech Republic) P Báša	9	4

Second Round
(Canada) J Dawson	15	15
(Germany) G Schänzler	6	12
(South Korea) Kang K-j	2	11
(Sweden) R Magnusson	15	15
(Netherlands) J van Dijk	15	15
(Mauritius) E Clarisse	6	3
(South Korea) Kim R-g	5	6
(Denmark) J P Nierhoff	15	15

Third Round
(Canada) J Dawson	9	15	8
(Sweden) R Magnusson	15	10	15
(Netherlands) J van Dijk	5	7
(Denmark) J P Nierhoff	15	15

Fourth Round
(Sweden) R Magnusson	15	6	10
(Denmark) J P Nierhoff	7	15	15

=== Section 16 ===
First Round
(Iceland) A Þ Hallgrímson	12	3
(Indonesia) B Suprianto	15	15
(France) C Jeanjean	15	3	3
(Switzerland) T Wapp	9	15	15

Second Round
(Indonesia) B Suprianto	15	15
(Switzerland) T Wapp	13	1
(Poland) J Hankiewicz	9	5
(England) M A. Smith	15	15
(Austria) H Fuchs	15	12	7
(Finland) T Tuominen	10	15	15
(Spain) D Serrano	6	0
(China) Wu WK	15	15

Third Round
(Indonesia) B Suprianto	15	15
(England) M A. Smith	9	5
(Finland) T Tuominen	5	7
(China) Wu WK	15	15

Fourth Round
(Indonesia) B Suprianto	1	18	6
(China) Wu WK	15	13	15

== Final stage ==
Fifth Round
(Indonesia) Ardy Wiranata	15	15
(China) Yu Lizhi	9	10
(Russia) Andrey Antropov	15	15
(England) Darren Hall	3	3
(China) Zhao Jianhua	17	15
(Indonesia) Hermawan Susanto	15	7
(Indonesia) Fung Permadi	2	15	12
(Denmark) Thomas Stuer-Lauridsen	15	4	15
(Indonesia) Joko Suprianto	15	15
(Denmark) Poul-Erik Høyer Larsen	10	3
(China) Liu Jun	15	15
(Malaysia) Foo Kok Keong	12	6
(Thailand) Sompol Kukasemkij	7	2
(Indonesia) Allan Budikusuma	15	15
(Denmark) Jens Peter Nierhoff	15	16	9
(China) Wu Wenkai	10	18	15

Quarterfinals
(Indonesia) Ardy Wiranata	15	10	18
(Russia) Andrey Antropov	4	15	15
(China) Zhao Jianhua	15	18
(Denmark) Thomas Stuer-Lauridsen	10	13
(Indonesia) Joko Suprianto	15	6	8
(China) Liu Jun	11	15	15
(Indonesia) Allan Budikusuma	9	15	17
(China) Wu Wenkai	15	4	14

Semifinals
(Indonesia) Ardy Wiranata	2	15	6
(China) Zhao Jianhua	15	10	15
(China) Liu Jun	11	11
(Indonesia) Allan Budikusuma	15	15

Final
(China) Zhao Jianhua	18	15
(Indonesia) Allan Budikusuma	13	4
