= 1995 IBF World Championships – Men's singles =

Badminton championships

Men's singles at the 1995 IBF World Championships
- Venue: Malley Sports Centre
- Location: Lausanne, Switzerland
- Dates: May 22, 1995 – May 28, 1995

Medalists
gold medal	Hariyanto Arbi	Indonesia
silver medal	Park Sung-woo	South Korea
bronze medal	Thomas Stuer-Lauridsen	Denmark
bronze medal	Poul-Erik Høyer Larsen	Denmark

The men's singles badminton tournament at the 1995 IBF World Championships were held in Lausanne, Switzerland, between 22 May and 28 May 1995. Following the results of the men's singles.

== Main stage ==
=== Section 1 ===
First round
(Indonesia) Hariyanto Arbi
bye
(Brazil) Euclides Freitas
bye
(Japan) Takaaki Hayashi	15	15
(Mozambique) Luis Antonio Timm	4	1
(Hong Kong) Tam Kai Chuen	3	18	12
(Finland) Jyri Aalto	15	15	15
(Russia) Vladislav Tikhomirov	12	18	15
(Malaysia) Roslin Hashim	15	17	11
(Austria) Heimo Götschl	15	15
(Macau) Joaquim Lobo	7	5
(Czech Republic) Jan Jurka
bye
(Italy) Andreas Pichler
bye

Second round
(Indonesia) Hariyanto Arbi	15	15
(Brazil) Euclides Freitas	2	1
(Japan) Takaaki Hayashi	5	7
(Finland) Jyri Aalto	15	15
(Russia) Vladislav Tikhomirov	9	17	15
(Austria) Heimo Götschl	15	4
(Czech Republic) Jan Jurka	15	15
(Italy) Andreas Pichler	9	10

Third round
(Indonesia) Hariyanto Arbi	15	15
(Finland) Jyri Aalto	10	5
(Russia) Vladislav Tikhomirov	15	15
(Czech Republic) Jan Jurka	2	6

Fourth round
(Indonesia) Hariyanto Arbi	15	15
(Russia) Vladislav Tikhomirov	8	7

=== Section 2 ===
First round
(South Korea) Lee Gwang-jin
bye
(China) Ge Cheng
bye
(England) Peter Knowles	15	15
(Argentina) Alejandro Meyer	1	2
(Pakistan) Islam Amir	15	15
(Nigeria) Wasiu Ogunseye	9	6
(Sweden) Thomas Johansson	15	15
(Belgium) Filip Vigneron	6	8
(Denmark) Søren B. Nielsen	15	15
(Slovenia) Simon Hawlina	1	3
(Netherlands) Chris Bruil
bye
(France) David Cocagne
bye

Second round
(South Korea) Lee Gwang-jin	2	15	15
(China) Ge Cheng	15	6	13
(England) Peter Knowles	15	15
(Pakistan) Islam Amir	5	4
(Sweden) Thomas Johansson	8	15	15
(Denmark) Søren B. Nielsen	15	6	12
(Netherlands) Chris Bruil	15	15
(France) David Cocagne	1	9

Third round
(South Korea) Lee Gwang-jin	5	15	15
(England) Peter Knowles	15	5	6
(Sweden) Thomas Johansson	6	17	15
(Netherlands) Chris Bruil	15	16	7

Fourth round
(South Korea) Lee Gwang-jin	15	18
(Sweden) Thomas Johansson	13	17

=== Section 3 ===
First round
(Indonesia) Joko Suprianto
bye
(India) Pullela Gopichand
bye
(Malaysia) Yong Hock Kin	15	15
(Spain) David Serrano	2	1
(Peru) Mario Carulla	17	15
(Switzerland) Stephan Baeriswyl	15	8
(Bulgaria) Teodor Velkov	15	15
(Iceland) Árni Þór Hallgrímson	6	5
(Germany) Detlef Poste	15	15
(Slovenia) Miha Šepec	6	0
(Australia) Craig Booley
bye
(Kazakhstan) Anton Tiajkoun
bye

Second round
(Indonesia) Joko Suprianto	15	15
(India) Pullela Gopichand	8	4
(Malaysia) Yong Hock Kin	15	15
(Peru) Mario Carulla	13	9
(Bulgaria) Teodor Velkov	15	15
(Germany) Detlef Poste	12	12
(Australia) Craig Booley	15	15
(Kazakhstan) Anton Tiajkoun	9	0

Third round
(Indonesia) Joko Suprianto	11	15	15
(Malaysia) Yong Hock Kin	15	1	1
(Bulgaria) Teodor Velkov	15	15
(Australia) Craig Booley	10	13

Fourth round
(Indonesia) Joko Suprianto	15	15
(Bulgaria) Teodor Velkov	10	3

=== Section 4 ===
First round
(China) Dong Jiong
bye
(Canada) Mike Beres
bye
(England) Robert Nock	15	15
(Portugal) Ricardo Fernandes	2	6
(Iran) Afshin Bozorgzadeh	15	15
(Morocco) Adelhafid Sedk	4	2
(Denmark) Martin Lundgaard Hansen	15	15
(Slovenia) Robert Cyprian	4	1
(Norway) Erik Lia	15	15
(Sri Lanka) Niroshan Wijekoon	2	5
(Poland) Jacek Niedźwiedzki
bye
(Malta) Aldo Polidano
bye

Second round
(China) Dong Jiong	15	17
(Canada) Mike Beres	11	14
(England) Robert Nock	15	15
(Iran) Afshin Bozorgzadeh	4	7
(Denmark) Martin Lundgaard Hansen	15	15
(Norway) Erik Lia	6	1
(Poland) Jacek Niedźwiedzki	15	15
(Malta) Aldo Polidano	1	3

Third round
(China) Dong Jiong	15	15
(England) Robert Nock	6	13
(Denmark) Martin Lundgaard Hansen	15	15
(Poland) Jacek Niedźwiedzki	11	0

Fourth round
(China) Dong Jiong	17	15
(Denmark) Martin Lundgaard Hansen	15	7

=== Section 5 ===
First round160
(Denmark) Poul-Erik Høyer Larsen	bye
(Macau) Lo Ka Lon
bye
(Czech Republic) Tomasz Mendrek	2	15	15
(Slovenia) Andrej Pohar	15	5	2
(Chinese Taipei) Lee Mou-chou	15	15
(New Zealand) Nick Hall	9	11
(Sweden) Henrik Bengtsson	15	15
(Bulgaria) Boris Kessov	8	7
(Netherlands) Joris van Soerland	15	15
(Italy) Gianmarco La Rosa	3	1
(United States) David Shaw
bye
(Nigeria) Danjuma Fatauchi
bye

Second round
(Denmark) Poul-Erik Høyer Larsen	15	15
(Macau) Lo Ka Lon	1	1
(Czech Republic) Tomasz Mendrek	6	15	18
(Chinese Taipei) Lee Mou-chou	15	12	17
(Sweden) Henrik Bengtsson	15	15
(Netherlands) Joris van Soerland	11	9
(United States) David Shaw	15	15
(Nigeria) Danjuma Fatauchi	6	11

Third round
(Denmark) Poul-Erik Høyer Larsen	15	15
(Czech Republic) Tomasz Mendrek	8	3
(Sweden) Henrik Bengtsson	15	15
(United States) David Shaw	8	3

Fourth round
(Denmark) Poul-Erik Høyer Larsen	15	15
(Sweden) Henrik Bengtsson	7	11

=== Section 6 ===
First round
(China) Chen Gang	15	15
(Republic of Ireland) Eugene McKenna	13	7
(Ukraine) Konstantin Tatranov	15	15
(Croatia) Silvio Jurčić	1	4
(Norway) Jim Ronny Andersen
bye
(Iran) Amir Hoshang Alboeeh
bye
(Indonesia) Lioe Tiong Ping
bye
(Hungary) Richárd Bánhidi
bye
(Canada) Frederic D'Amours	15	15
(Belgium) Philippe Gennaux	2	6
(Wales) Richard Vaughan	15	15
(Brazil) Guilherme Kumasaka	0	4

Second round
(China) Chen Gang	15	15
(Ukraine) Konstantin Tatranov	11	4
(Norway) Jim Ronny Andersen	15	15
(Iran) Amir Hoshang Alboeeh	1	3
(Indonesia) Lioe Tiong Ping	15	15
(Hungary) Richárd Bánhidi	9	8
(Canada) Frederic D'Amours	15	15
(Wales) Richard Vaughan	6	7

Third round
(China) Chen Gang	15	15
(Norway) Jim Ronny Andersen	7	7
(Indonesia) Lioe Tiong Ping	15	15
(Canada) Frederic D'Amours	4	4

Fourth round
(China) Chen Gang	15	15
(Indonesia) Lioe Tiong Ping	9	12

=== Section 7 ===
First round
(Indonesia) Hermawan Susanto
bye
(Australia) Stuart Metcalfe
bye
(Scotland) Bruce Flockhart	15	17
(France) Étienne Thobois	14	9
(Bulgaria) Plamen Peev	15	15
(Slovenia) Bojan Strah	3	2
(Switzerland) Thomas Wapp
bye
(Morocco) Boumediane Louati
bye
(Belgium) Pedro Vanneste	15	15
(Belarus) Vyatcheslav Roudnitski	10	4
(Peru) Gustavo Salazar	w.o.
(Kazakhstan) Konstantin Dubs

Second round
(Indonesia) Hermawan Susanto	15	15
(Australia) Stuart Metcalfe	5	2
(Scotland) Bruce Flockhart	17	15
(Bulgaria) Plamen Peev	14	0
(Switzerland) Thomas Wapp	15	15
(Morocco) Boumediane Louati	1	2
(Belgium) Pedro Vanneste	15	15
(Peru) Gustavo Salazar	10	5

Third round
(Indonesia) Hermawan Susanto	15	15
(Scotland) Bruce Flockhart	6	10
(Switzerland) Thomas Wapp	11	15	15
(Belgium) Pedro Vanneste	15	9	9

Fourth round
(Indonesia) Hermawan Susanto	15	15
(Switzerland) Thomas Wapp	2	3

=== Section 8 ===
First round
(Finland) Robert Liljequist	15	15
(Cyprus) Nicolas Pissis	3	4
(Japan) Kusamao Suzuki	15	15
(Mauritius) Eddy Clarisse	9	2
(England) Anders Nielsen
bye
(Iceland) Guðmundur Adolfsson
bye
(South Korea) Kim Hak-kyun
bye
(Germany) Volker Renzelmann
bye
(Malaysia) Ong Ewe Hock	w.o.
(Thailand) Sompol Kukasemkij
(Austria) Peter Kreulitsch	15	15
(Lithuania) Aivaras Kvedarauskas	1	8

Second round
(Finland) Robert Liljequist	15	15
(Japan) Kusamao Suzuki	9	7
(England) Anders Nielsen	15	15
(Iceland) Guðmundur Adolfsson	2	6
(South Korea) Kim Hak-kyun	15	15
(Germany) Volker Renzelmann	7	4
(Malaysia) Ong Ewe Hock	15	15
(Austria) Peter Kreulitsch	10	3

Third round
(Finland) Robert Liljequist	15	6	15
(England) Anders Nielsen	12	15	3
(South Korea) Kim Hak-kyun	15	15
(Malaysia) Ong Ewe Hock	4	0

Fourth round
(Finland) Robert Liljequist	3	15	15
(South Korea) Kim Hak-kyun	15	9	7

=== Section 9 ===
First round
(South Korea) Park Sung-woo
bye
(Morocco) Abdelhadi Kella
bye
(Australia) Paul Stevenson	15	15
(Italy) Christian Hinteregger	3	2
(New Zealand) Dean Galt	15	15
(Pakistan) Mirza Ali Yar Beg	5	5
(Japan) Fumihiko Machida	15	15
(Nigeria) Agarawu Tunde	2	5
(France) Vincent Laigle	w.o.
(Iran) Daryoush Eskandare
(Norway) Hans Sperre jr.
bye
(Republic of Ireland) Bruce Topping
bye

Second round
(South Korea) Park Sung-woo	w.o.
(Morocco) Abdelhadi Kella
(Australia) Paul Stevenson	15	15
(New Zealand) Dean Galt	10	7
(Japan) Fumihiko Machida	15	15
(France) Vincent Laigle	1	2
(Norway) Hans Sperre jr.	15	15
(Republic of Ireland) Bruce Topping	8	4

Third round
(South Korea) Park Sung-woo	15	15
(Australia) Paul Stevenson	2	8
(Japan) Fumihiko Machida	17	15
(Norway) Hans Sperre jr.	14	10

Fourth round
(South Korea) Park Sung-woo	15	15
(Japan) Fumihiko Machida	6	8

=== Section 10 ===
First round
(Denmark) Peter Rasmussen	15	15
(Switzerland) Philip Kurz	3	5
(Brazil) Leandro Santos	15	15
(Singapore) Kin Meng Horatius Hwang	6	12
(India) Rajeev Bagga
bye
(Netherlands) Jeroen van Dijk
bye
(England) Darren Hall	15	15
(Malaysia) Lo Ah Heng	3	6
(Sri Lanka) Duminda Jayakody	10	15	15
(Chinese Taipei) Chang Jeng-shyuang	15	10	7
(Spain) Ernesto García
bye
(Lithuania) Dainius Lukošius	15	15
(Mozambique) Serpa Pinto Horacio	6	12

Second round
(Denmark) Peter Rasmussen	15	15
(Brazil) Leandro Santos	3	2
(India) Rajeev Bagga	w.o.
(Netherlands) Jeroen van Dijk
(England) Darren Hall	18	15
(Sri Lanka) Duminda Jayakody	14	4
(Spain) Ernesto García	15	15
(Lithuania) Dainius Lukošius	1	2

Third round
(Denmark) Peter Rasmussen	15	15
(India) Rajeev Bagga	6	8
(England) Darren Hall	15	15
(Spain) Ernesto García	4	3

Fourth round
(Denmark) Peter Rasmussen	15	17
(England) Darren Hall	4	14

=== Section 11 ===
First round
(Indonesia) Alan Budikusuma
bye
(Belgium) Luigi Dalli Cardillo
bye
(Germany) Oliver Pongratz	15	15
(Scotland) Craig Robertson	4	1
(Austria) Tariq Farooq	15	15
(Cyprus) Antonis S. Lazarou	6	1
(Poland) Dariusz Zięba	w.o.
(Iran) Ali Cheraginik
(France) Bertrand Gallet	3	18	15
(Switzerland) Rémy Matthey de l'Etang	15	13	13
(Kazakhstan) Igor Dmitriev
bye
(France) Mihail Popov
bye

Second round
(Indonesia) Alan Budikusuma	15	15
(Belgium) Luigi Dalli Cardillo	2	1
(Germany) Oliver Pongratz	15	15
(Austria) Tariq Farooq	3	1
(Poland) Dariusz Zięba	15	15
(France) Bertrand Gallet	12	7
(Kazakhstan) Igor Dmitriev	18	15
(France) Mihail Popov	17	10

Third round
(Indonesia) Alan Budikusuma	15	15
(Germany) Oliver Pongratz	0	4
(Poland) Dariusz Zięba	17	15
(Kazakhstan) Igor Dmitriev	16	7

Fourth round
(Indonesia) Alan Budikusuma	15	15
(Poland) Dariusz Zięba	3	4

=== Section 12 ===
First round
(Sweden) Jens Olsson
bye
(Slovenia) Sašo Zrnec
bye
(Denmark) Peter Gade	15	15
(Czech Republic) Ondřej Lubas	9	6
(Canada) Jaimie Dawson	15	15
(Macau) Sam Kin Chong	0	1
(Russia) Andrey Antropov	15	15
(Turkey) Mert Aydogmus	2	0
(Hungary) Gyula Szalai	15	15
(Mauritius) Gilles Allet	6	6
(China) Lin Liwen
bye
(Finland) Lasse Lindelöf
bye

Second round
(Sweden) Jens Olsson	15	15
(Slovenia) Sašo Zrnec	2	2
(Denmark) Peter Gade	15	15
(Canada) Jaimie Dawson	4	10
(Russia) Andrey Antropov	15	15
(Hungary) Gyula Szalai	7	5
(China) Lin Liwen	15	15
(Finland) Lasse Lindelöf	9	4

Third round
(Sweden) Jens Olsson	15	15
(Denmark) Peter Gade	12	7
(Russia) Andrey Antropov	13	15	15
(China) Lin Liwen	15	7	1

Fourth round
(Sweden) Jens Olsson	15	15
(Russia) Andrey Antropov	8	2

=== Section 13 ===
First round
(Denmark) Thomas Stuer-Lauridsen
bye
(Portugal) Fernando Silva
bye
(Finland) Pontus Jäntti	15	15
(Argentina) Jorge Meyer	0	0
(Sweden) Rikard Magnusson	15	15
(France) Jean-Frédéric Massias	13	9
(Netherlands) Pierre Pelupessy	15	15
(Cyprus) Antonis L. Lazarou	1	1
(New Zealand) Glenn Stewart	15	15
(Chinese Taipei) Juang Jinn-der	5	3
(Russia) Pavel Uvarov
bye
(Belgium) Jim van Bouwel
bye

Second round
(Denmark) Thomas Stuer-Lauridsen	15	15
(Portugal) Fernando Silva	3	8
(Finland) Pontus Jäntti	15	15
(Sweden) Rikard Magnusson	4	7
(Netherlands) Pierre Pelupessy	15	15
(New Zealand) Glenn Stewart	8	10
(Russia) Pavel Uvarov	15	15
(Belgium) Jim van Bouwel	2	3

Third round
(Denmark) Thomas Stuer-Lauridsen	15	15
(Finland) Pontus Jäntti	7	3
(Netherlands) Pierre Pelupessy	17	15	15
(Russia) Pavel Uvarov	18	9	12

Fourth round
(Denmark) Thomas Stuer-Lauridsen	15	18
(Netherlands) Pierre Pelupessy	11	14

=== Section 14 ===
First round
(South Korea) Ahn Jae-chang	15	15
(Belarus) Mikhail Korshuk	10	1
(Switzerland) Christian Nyffenegger	15	15
(Iran) Morteza Khedmaty	5	6
(China) Sun Jun
bye
(England) Peter Bush
bye
(Thailand) Vacharapan Khamthong	15	15
(Iceland) Broddi Kristjánsson	9	3
(Malaysia) Kantharoopan Ponniah	15	15
(Nigeria) Kayode Akinsanya	3	1
(Bulgaria) Jasen Borisov
bye
(Italy) Enrico La Rosa
bye

Second round
(South Korea) Ahn Jae-chang	15	15
(Switzerland) Christian Nyffenegger	4	3
(China) Sun Jun	17	15
(England) Peter Bush	15	4
(Thailand) Vacharapan Khamthong	17	15
(Malaysia) Kantharoopan Ponniah	16	9
(Bulgaria) Jasen Borisov	15	15
(Italy) Enrico La Rosa	4	4

Third round
(South Korea) Ahn Jae-chang	13	15	15
(China) Sun Jun	18	12	12
(Thailand) Vacharapan Khamthong	15	15
(Bulgaria) Jasen Borisov	5	5

Fourth round
(South Korea) Ahn Jae-chang	15	15
(Thailand) Vacharapan Khamthong	1	5

=== Section 15 ===
First round
(Malaysia) Rashid Sidek
bye
(Ukraine) Vladislav Druzchenko
bye
(Germany) Michael Helber	15	15
(Bulgaria) Stojan Ivantchev	12	7
(Malta) Kenneth Vella	15	15
(Slovenia) Ales Babnik	5	6
(China) Xie Yangchun	15	15
(South Korea) Lee Yong-sun	2	1
(England) Anthony Bush	15	15
(Hong Kong) Tam Lok Tin	11	5
(Macau) Sam Kai Chong
bye
(Italy) Andrea Chiappini
bye

Second round
(Malaysia) Rashid Sidek	15	15
(Ukraine) Vladislav Druzchenko	9	1
(Germany) Michael Helber	15	15
(Malta) Kenneth Vella	7	10
(China) Xie Yangchun	15	15
(England) Anthony Bush	5	2
(Macau) Sam Kai Chong	15	17
(Italy) Andrea Chiappini	10	14

Third round
(Malaysia) Rashid Sidek	15	15
(Germany) Michael Helber	5	9
(China) Xie Yangchun	15	15
(Macau) Sam Kai Chong	2	3

Fourth round
(Malaysia) Rashid Sidek	15	15
(China) Xie Yangchun	8	2

=== Section 16 ===
First round
(Indonesia) Ardy Wiranata
bye
(Japan) Shinji Bito
bye
(Canada) Iain Sydie	15	15
(Austria) Jürgen Koch	10	7
(Spain) Arturo Ruiz López	15	15
(Mauritius) Stephan Beeharry	6	5
(United States) Kevin Han	w.o.
(Iran) Mohammad Golkar
(Peru) José Antonio Iturriaga	15	15
(Slovakia) Peter Pudela	3	8
(Wales) John Leung
bye
(Switzerland) Denis Dafflon
bye

Second round
(Indonesia) Ardy Wiranata	15	15
(Japan) Shinji Bito	4	1
(Canada) Iain Sydie	15	15
(Spain) Arturo Ruiz López	3	3
(United States) Kevin Han	15	15
(Peru) José Antonio Iturriaga	4	2
(Wales) John Leung	15	15
(Switzerland) Denis Dafflon	4	2

Third round
(Indonesia) Ardy Wiranata	15	15
(Canada) Iain Sydie	7	3
(United States) Kevin Han	15	15
(Wales) John Leung	8	4

Fourth round
(Indonesia) Ardy Wiranata	15	15
(United States) Kevin Han	3	8

== Final stage ==
Fifth round
(Indonesia) Hariyanto Arbi	15	15
(South Korea) Lee Gwang-jin	12	12
(Indonesia) Joko Suprianto	15	15
(China) Dong Jiong	5	4
(Denmark) Poul-Erik Høyer Larsen	15	15
(China) Chen Gang	2	4
(Indonesia) Hermawan Susanto	15	15
(Finland) Robert Liljequist	5	1
(South Korea) Park Sung-woo	15	15
(Denmark) Peter Rasmussen	9	6
(Indonesia) Alan Budikusuma	15	15
(Sweden) Jens Olsson	5	5
(Denmark) Thomas Stuer-Lauridsen	15	15
(South Korea) Ahn Jae-chang	8	10
(Malaysia) Rashid Sidek	6	18	15
(Indonesia) Ardy Wiranata	15	13	5

Quarterfinal
(Indonesia) Hariyanto Arbi	15	15
(Indonesia) Joko Suprianto	8	7
(Denmark) Poul-Erik Høyer Larsen	15	15	15
(Indonesia) Hermawan Susanto	18	12	13
(South Korea) Park Sung-woo	18	15
(Indonesia) Alan Budikusuma	15	9
(Denmark) Thomas Stuer-Lauridsen	15	15
(Malaysia) Rashid Sidek	10	1

Semifinal
(Indonesia) Hariyanto Arbi	15	15
(Denmark) Poul-Erik Høyer Larsen	10	7
(South Korea) Park Sung-woo	8	1
(Denmark) Thomas Stuer-Lauridsen	15	5	rtd

Final
(Indonesia) Hariyanto Arbi	15	15
(South Korea) Park Sung-woo	11	8
