= 1995 IBF World Championships =

Tournament details
- Dates: 22 May – 28 May
- Edition: 9th
- Level: International
- Venue: Malley Sports Centre
- Location: Lausanne, Switzerland

The 1995 IBF World Championships (World Badminton Championships) were held in Lausanne, Switzerland, between 22 May and 28 May 1995.

== Venue ==
- Malley Sports Centre

== Medalists ==
=== Medal table ===
* Host nation (Switzerland)

| Rank | Nation | Gold | Silver | Bronze | Total |
|---|---|---|---|---|---|
| 1 | Indonesia | 2 | 1 | 1 | 4 |
| 2 | Denmark | 1 | 2 | 3 | 6 |
| 3 | China | 1 | 1 | 2 | 4 |
| 3 | South Korea | 1 | 1 | 2 | 4 |
| 5 | Malaysia | 0 | 0 | 1 | 1 |
| 5 | Sweden | 0 | 0 | 1 | 1 |
| Totals (6 entries) | | 5 | 5 | 10 | 20 |

=== Events ===
| Event | Gold | Silver | Bronze |
|---|---|---|---|
| Men's Singles | (Indonesia) Heryanto Arbi | (South Korea) Park Sung-woo | (Denmark) Poul-Erik Høyer Larsen |
| Men's Singles | (Indonesia) Heryanto Arbi | (South Korea) Park Sung-woo | (Denmark) Thomas Stuer-Lauridsen |
| Women's Singles | (China) Ye Zhaoying | (China) Han Jingna | (Indonesia) Susi Susanti |
| Women's Singles | (China) Ye Zhaoying | (China) Han Jingna | (South Korea) Bang Soo-hyun |
| Men's Doubles | (Indonesia) Rexy Mainaky (Indonesia) Ricky Subagja | (Denmark) Jon Holst-Christensen (Denmark) Thomas Lund | (Malaysia) Cheah Soon Kit (Malaysia) Yap Kim Hock |
| Men's Doubles | (Indonesia) Rexy Mainaky (Indonesia) Ricky Subagja | (Denmark) Jon Holst-Christensen (Denmark) Thomas Lund | (South Korea) Kim Dong-moon (South Korea) Yoo Yong-sung |
| Women's Doubles | (South Korea) Gil Young-ah (South Korea) Jang Hye-ock | (Indonesia) Finarsih (Indonesia) Lili Tampi | (China) Qin Yiyuan (China) Tang Yongshu |
| Women's Doubles | (South Korea) Gil Young-ah (South Korea) Jang Hye-ock | (Indonesia) Finarsih (Indonesia) Lili Tampi | (Denmark) Helene Kirkegaard (Denmark) Rikke Olsen |
| Mixed Doubles | (Denmark) Thomas Lund (Denmark) Marlene Thomsen | (Denmark) Jens Eriksen (Denmark) Helene Kirkegaard | (Sweden) Jan-Eric Antonsson (Sweden) Astrid Crabo |
| Mixed Doubles | (Denmark) Thomas Lund (Denmark) Marlene Thomsen | (Denmark) Jens Eriksen (Denmark) Helene Kirkegaard | (China) Liu Jianjun (China) Ge Fei |
