= 1992 Uber Cup group stage =

Badminton Team Tournament in Kuala Lumpur

The 1992 Uber Cup group stage was held at Stadium Negara in Kuala Lumpur, Malaysia, from 5 to 10 May 1992.

The group stage was first stage of the tournament where only the two highest-placing teams in each of the two groups advanced to the knockout stage.

== Draw ==
The original draw for the tournament was conducted on 13 March 1992. The 8 teams will be drawn into two groups each containing four teams.

=== Group composition ===
Group
Group A	Group B
China; Indonesia; Malaysia (Host); Netherlands	England; Japan; South Korea; Sweden

== Group A ==
Pos	Team	Pld	W	L	GF	GA	GD	PF	PA	PD	Pts	Qualification
1	China	3	3	0	28	4	+24	395	176	+219	3	Advance to semi-finals
2	Indonesia	3	2	1	24	8	+16	371	197	+174	2	Advance to semi-finals
3	Malaysia (H)	3	1	2	8	23	−15	174	323	−149	1	
4	Netherlands	3	0	3	3	28	−25	127	371	−244	0	

Source: The Straits Times
(H) Host

=== China vs Malaysia ===
China
5
Stadium Negara
5 May 1992, 19:00 UTC+8

Malaysia
0

			1	2	3
1	(China) (Malaysia)	Tang Jiuhong; Lee Wai Leng	11; 2	11; 3
2	(China) (Malaysia)	Lin Yanfen / Yao Fen; Kuak Seok Choon / Zamaliah Sidek	15; 1	15; 2
3	(China) (Malaysia)	Huang Hua; Tan Lee Wai	11; 2	11; 8
4	(China) (Malaysia)	Nong Qunhua / Wu Yuhong; Chong Ying Ching / Ai Leen	15; 3	15; 5
5	(China) (Malaysia)	Ye Zhaoying; Choong Mee Leng	11; 3	11; 0

=== Indonesia vs Netherlands ===
Indonesia
5
Stadium Negara
6 May 1992, 19:00 UTC+8

Netherlands
0

			1	2	3
1	(Indonesia) (Netherlands)	Susi Susanti; Monique Hoogland	11; 1	11; 2
2	(Indonesia) (Netherlands)	Finarsih / Lili Tampi; Elvira van Elven / Nicole van Hooren	15; 2	15; 1
3	(Indonesia) (Netherlands)	Sarwendah Kusumawardhani; Monique Meijer	11; 0	11; 4
4	(Indonesia) (Netherlands)	Erma Sulistianingsih / Rosiana Tendean; Monique Hoogland / Sonja Mellink	15; 5	15; 8
5	(Indonesia) (Netherlands)	Yuliani Santosa; Carolien Glebbeek	11; 0	11; 5

=== China vs Netherlands ===
China
5
Stadium Negara
7 May 1992, 19:00 UTC+8

Netherlands
0

			1	2	3
1	(China) (Netherlands)	Tang Jiuhong; Monique Hoogland	11; 1	11; 1
2	(China) (Netherlands)	Huang Hua; Sonja Mellink	11; 1	11; 2
3	(China) (Netherlands)	Lin Yanfen / Yao Fen; Carolien Glebbeek / Nicole van Hooren	15; 2	15; 6
4	(China) (Netherlands)	Ye Zhaoying; Elvira van Elven	11; 1	11; 3
5	(China) (Netherlands)	Guan Weizhen / Nong Qunhua; Monique Hoogland / Sonja Mellink	15; 3	15; 8

=== Indonesia vs Malaysia ===
Indonesia
5
Stadium Negara
8 May 1992, 19:00 UTC+8

Malaysia
0

			1	2	3
1	(Indonesia) (Malaysia)	Susi Susanti; Choong Mee Leng	11; 0	11; 1
2	(Indonesia) (Malaysia)	Finarsih / Lili Tampi; Tan Siew Cheng / Zamaliah Sidek	15; 5	15; 3
3	(Indonesia) (Malaysia)	Sarwendah Kusumawardhani; Wong Mee Hung	11; 2	11; 1
4	(Indonesia) (Malaysia)	Erma Sulistianingsih / Rosiana Tendean; Lee Wai Leng / Tan Lee Wai	15; 2	15; 7
5	(Indonesia) (Malaysia)	Yuliani Santosa; Ai Leen	11; 1	11; 4

=== Malaysia vs Netherlands ===
Malaysia
4
Stadium Negara
9 May 1992, 19:00 UTC+8

Netherlands
1

			1	2	3
1	(Malaysia) (Netherlands)	Lee Wai Leng; Sonja Mellink	12; 9	11; 3
2	(Malaysia) (Netherlands)	Tan Lee Wai; Monique Meijer	11; 2	11; 0
3	(Malaysia) (Netherlands)	Kuak Seok Choon / Zamaliah Sidek; Carolien Glebbeek / Nicole van Hooren	7; 15	7; 15
4	(Malaysia) (Netherlands)	Wong Mee Hung; Elvira van Elven	8; 11	11; 5	11; 3
5	(Malaysia) (Netherlands)	Lee Wai Leng / Tan Lee Wai; Monique Hoogland / Sonja Mellink	15; 5	15; 3

=== China vs Indonesia ===
China
4
Stadium Negara
10 May 1992, 19:00 UTC+8

Indonesia
1

			1	2	3
1	(China) (Indonesia)	Tang Jiuhong; Susi Susanti	9; 12	6; 11
2	(China) (Indonesia)	Guan Weizhen / Nong Qunhua; Erma Sulistianingsih / Rosiana Tendean	15; 12	15; 9
3	(China) (Indonesia)	Huang Hua; Sarwendah Kusumawardhani	11; 8	11; 4
4	(China) (Indonesia)	Wu Yuhong / Yao Fen; Finarsih / Lili Tampi	15; 12	11; 15	15; 5
5	(China) (Indonesia)	Ye Zhaoying; Yuliani Santosa	12; 10	11; 12	12; 9

== Group B ==
Pos	Team	Pld	W	L	GF	GA	GD	PF	PA	PD	Pts	Qualification
1	South Korea	3	3	0	29	8	+21	412	229	+183	3	Advance to semi-finals
2	Sweden	3	2	1	19	19	0	361	359	+2	2	Advance to semi-finals
3	Japan	3	1	2	9	23	−14	241	352	−111	1	
4	England	3	0	3	14	22	−8	322	395	−73	0	

Source: The Straits Times

=== South Korea vs Japan ===
South Korea
5
Stadium Negara
5 May 1992, 19:00 UTC+8

Japan
0

			1	2	3
1	(South Korea) (Japan)	Bang Soo-hyun; Hisako Mizui	11; 5	11; 6
2	(South Korea) (Japan)	Chung Myung-hee / Hwang Hye-young; Kimiko Jinnai / Hisako Mori	15; 5	15; 5
3	(South Korea) (Japan)	Lee Heung-soon; Harumi Kohara	11; 3	11; 6
4	(South Korea) (Japan)	Chung So-young / Gil Young-ah; Tomomi Matsuo / Kyoko Sasage	15; 11	15; 10
5	(South Korea) (Japan)	Shim Eun-jung; Aiko Miyamura	11; 3	11; 5

=== Sweden vs England ===
Sweden
3
Stadium Negara
6 May 1992, 19:00 UTC+8

England
2

			1	2	3
1	(Sweden) (England)	Lim Xiaoqing; Helen Troke	12; 10	11; 1
2	(Sweden) (England)	Christine Magnusson; Joanne Muggeridge	11; 2	10; 12	1; 11
3	(Sweden) (England)	Catrine Bengtsson; Suzanne Louis	11; 1	3; 11	8; 11
4	(Sweden) (England)	Christine Magnusson / Lim Xiaoqing; Gillian Clark / Gillian Gowers	17; 18	17; 15	18; 16
5	(Sweden) (England)	Catrine Bengtsson / Maria Bengtsson; Alison Humby / Joanne Wright	17; 18	10; 15

=== South Korea vs England ===
South Korea
5
Stadium Negara
7 May 1992, 19:00 UTC+8

England
0

			1	2	3
1	(South Korea) (England)	Lee Heung-soon; Joanne Muggeridge	11; 3	11; 0
2	(South Korea) (England)	Gil Young-ah / Hwang Hye-young; Gillian Clark / Gillian Gowers	10; 15	15; 2	15; 6
3	(South Korea) (England)	Shim Eun-jung; Fiona Smith	6; 11	11; 5	11; 6
4	(South Korea) (England)	Bang Soo-hyun / Chung Myung-hee; Alison Humby / Joanne Wright	15; 7	15; 7
5	(South Korea) (England)	Park Soo-yun; Suzanne Louis	7; 11	11; 4	11; 4

=== Sweden vs Japan ===
Sweden
4
Stadium Negara
8 May 1992, 19:00 UTC+8

Japan
1

			1	2	3
1	(Sweden) (Japan)	Lim Xiaoqing; Hisako Mizui	12; 9	11; 3
2	(Sweden) (Japan)	Christine Magnusson; Harumi Kohara	11; 3	11; 4
3	(Sweden) (Japan)	Catrine Bengtsson; Aiko Miyamura	11; 7	11; 1
4	(Sweden) (Japan)	Lim Xiaoqing / Christine Magnusson; Kimiko Jinnai / Hisako Mori	8; 15	15; 5	15; 4
5	(Sweden) (Japan)	Catrine Bengtsson / Maria Bengtsson; Tomomi Matsuo / Kyoko Sasage	10; 15	11; 15

=== England vs Japan ===
England
2
Stadium Negara
9 May 1992, 19:00 UTC+8

Japan
3

			1	2	3
1	(England) (Japan)	Helen Troke; Hisako Mizui	1; 11	4; 11
2	(England) (Japan)	Gillian Clark / Gillian Gowers; Kimiko Jinnai / Hisako Mori	15; 6	15; 2
3	(England) (Japan)	Joanne Muggeridge; Aiko Miyamura	11; 8	8; 11	5; 11
4	(England) (Japan)	Alison Humby / Joanne Wright; Tomomi Matsuo / Kyoko Sasage	8; 15	11; 15
5	(England) (Japan)	Fiona Smith; Harumi Kohara	11; 4	11; 7

=== South Korea vs Sweden ===
South Korea
4
Stadium Negara
10 May 1992, 19:00 UTC+8

Sweden
1

			1	2	3
1	(South Korea) (Sweden)	Bang Soo-hyun; Lim Xiaoqing	4; 11	11; 2	0; 11
2	(South Korea) (Sweden)	Lee Heung-soon; Christine Magnusson	6; 11	11; 4	11; 2
3	(South Korea) (Sweden)	Shim Eun-jung; Catrine Bengtsson	11; 1	1; 11	11; 0
4	(South Korea) (Sweden)	Chung So-young / Hwang Hye-young; Lim Xiaoqing / Christine Magnusson	15; 9	11; 15	15; 2
5	(South Korea) (Sweden)	Chung Myung-hee / Gil Young-ah; Catrine Bengtsson / Maria Bengtsson	15; 5	15; 5
