= Park Sung-woo (badminton) =

South Korean badminton player

Park Sung-woo 박성우
Personal information
- Born: 22 August 1971 (age 55)
- Height: 1.82 m (6 ft 0 in)
- Weight: 74 kg (163 lb)

Sport
- Country: South Korea
- Sport: Badminton
- Handedness: Right

Men's singles
- Highest ranking: 2
- BWF profile
Medal record
Men's badminton
Representing South Korea
World Championships
Silver medal – second place	1995 Lausanne	Men's singles
World Cup
Bronze medal – third place	1996 Jakarta	Men's singles
Sudirman Cup
Gold medal – first place	1993 Birmingham	Mixed team
Silver medal – second place	1997 Glasgow	Mixed team
Bronze medal – third place	1995 Lausanne	Mixed team
Thomas Cup
Bronze medal – third place	1992 Kuala Lumpur	Men's team
Bronze medal – third place	1994 Jakarta	Men's team
Bronze medal – third place	1996 Hong Kong	Men's team
Asian Games
Silver medal – second place	1994 Hiroshima	Men's team
Bronze medal – third place	1998 Bangkok	Men's team
Asian Championships
Gold medal – first place	1995 Beijing	Men's singles
Bronze medal – third place	1994 Shanghai	Men's singles
Asian Cup
Bronze medal – third place	1995 Qingdao	Men's singles

- Park Sung-woo
- Hangul: 박성우
- RR: Bak Seongu
- MR: Pak Sŏngu

Park Sung-woo (born 22 August 1971) is a former badminton player from South Korea who later became a national team coach.

== Career ==
Park won the men's singles title at the 1995 Asian Championships. He also won the 1995 Swedish Open. That same year, he made history in Korean badminton as the first ever South Korean to win a silver medal in the men's singles event at the World Championships.

In 1996, he finished as a semifinalist at the All England Open. At the 1996 Summer Olympics, he reached the quarterfinals. He reached a career high of world number 2 in World Ranking.

At the national level, Park who played for Dangjin, won the men's singles title at the 1996 Korean National Sports Festival.

After retiring from international tournaments, Park started a career as a Japanese national coach in 2006, and later moved back to his country, also as a national coach.

== Personal life ==
Park married Lim O-kyeong, a former South Korean Olympian handball player, in 1998, and the duo have a daughter. In 2007, Park and Lim then divorced after ten years of marriage.

== Achievements ==
=== World Championships ===
Men's singles
Year	Venue	Opponent	Score	Result
1995	Malley Sports Centre, Lausanne, Switzerland	(Indonesia) Heryanto Arbi	11–15, 8–15	Silver

=== World Cup ===
Men's singles
Year	Venue	Opponent	Score	Result
1996	Istora Senayan, Jakarta, Indonesia	(China) Dong Jiong	14–17, 2–15	Bronze

=== Asian Championships ===
Men's singles
Year	Venue	Opponent	Score	Result
1994	Shanghai Gymnasium, Shanghai, China	(China) Liu Jun	5–15, 15–4, 12–15	Bronze
1995	Olympic Sports Center Gymnasium, Beijing, China	(China) Sun Jun	15–8, 15–8	Gold

=== Asian Cup ===
Men's singles
Year	Venue	Opponent	Score	Result
1995	Xinxing Gymnasium, Qingdao, China	(Indonesia) Joko Suprianto	15–9, 14–17, 1–15	Bronze

=== IBF World Grand Prix ===
The World Badminton Grand Prix sanctioned by International Badminton Federation (IBF) from 1983 to 2006.

Men's singles
Year	Tournament	Opponent	Score	Result
1995	Swedish Open	(South Korea) Kim Hak-kyun	17–18, 15–3, 15–4	(gold) Winner
1997	Japan Open	(Denmark) Peter Rasmussen	3–15, 1–15	(silver) Runner-up
1997	Korea Open	(Denmark) Thomas Stuer-Lauridsen	12–15, 10–15	(silver) Runner-up

=== IBF International ===
Men's singles
Year	Tournament	Opponent	Score	Result
1991	USSR International	(Soviet Union) Mikhail Korshuk	15–3, 15–12	(gold) Winner

Men's doubles
Year	Tournament	Partner	Opponent	Score	Result
1989	Canadian Open	(South Korea) Yoo Dae-yun	(Canada) Mike Bitten (Canada) Bryan Blanshard	15–4, 7–15, 4–15	(silver) Runner-up
1991	USSR International	(South Korea) Kim Hyung-jin	(South Korea) Kim Moon-soo (South Korea) Park Joo-bong	4–15, 5–15	(silver) Runner-up
