= 1992 Uber Cup knockout stage =

International badminton championship

The knockout stage for the 1992 Uber Cup in Kuala Lumpur, Malaysia began on 12 May 1992 with the semi-finals and ended on 15 May 1992 with the final.

== Qualified teams ==
The top two placed teams from each of the two groups qualified for this stage.

Group	Winners	Runners-up
A	China	Indonesia
B	South Korea	Sweden

== Bracket ==
Semi-finals
China	5
Sweden	0
Indonesia	1
South Korea	4

Final
China	3
South Korea	2

== Semi-finals ==
=== Semi-final 1 ===
China
5
Stadium Negara
12 May 1992, 19:00 UTC+8

Sweden
0

			1	2	3
1	(China) (Sweden)	Tang Jiuhong; Lim Xiaoqing	12; 11	11; 7
2	(China) (Sweden)	Huang Hua; Christine Magnusson	11; 1	8; 11	12; 10
3	(China) (Sweden)	Ye Zhaoying; Astrid Crabo	11; 2	12; 9
4	(China) (Sweden)	Lin Yanfen / Yao Fen; Maria Bengtsson / Margit Borg	15; 9	15; 7
5	(China) (Sweden)	Guan Weizhen / Nong Qunhua; Lim Xiaoqing / Christine Magnusson				w/o

=== Semi-final 2 ===
South Korea
4
Stadium Negara
13 May 1992, 19:00 UTC+8

Indonesia
1

			1	2	3
1	(South Korea) (Indonesia)	Bang Soo-hyun; Susi Susanti	6; 11	2; 11
2	(South Korea) (Indonesia)	Chung So-young / Hwang Hye-young; Finarsih / Lili Tampi	15; 12	15; 10
3	(South Korea) (Indonesia)	Lee Heung-soon; Sarwendah Kusumawardhani	11; 7	11; 6
4	(South Korea) (Indonesia)	Chung Myung-hee / Gil Young-ah; Rosiana Tendean / Susi Susanti	15; 7	15; 10
5	(South Korea) (Indonesia)	Shim Eun-jung; Yuliani Santosa	11; 1	8; 11	12; 11

== Final ==
South Korea
2
Stadium Negara
15 May 1992, 19:00 UTC+8

China
3

			1	2	3
1	(South Korea) (China)	Bang Soo-hyun; Tang Jiuhong	5; 11	10; 12
2	(South Korea) (China)	Hwang Hye-young / Chung So-young; Guan Weizhen / Nong Qunhua	17; 18	15; 7	15; 9
3	(South Korea) (China)	Lee Heung-soon; Huang Hua	8; 11	9; 12
4	(South Korea) (China)	Chung Myung-hee / Gil Young-ah; Yao Fen / Lin Yanfen	15; 6	15; 5
5	(South Korea) (China)	Shim Eun-jung; Ye Zhaoying	11; 3	8; 11	7; 11
