= 1999 Badminton Asia Cup =

Badminton championships

JVC Asia Cup 1999
Tournament information
- Location: Phan Đình Phùng indoor stadium, Ho Chi Minh City, Vietnam
- Date: 10–14 November 1999

The 1999 Badminton Asia Cup; officially called as JVC Asia Cup 1999 was the 2nd edition of the Badminton Asia Cup. It was held in Phan Đình Phùng indoor stadium, Ho Chi Minh City, Vietnam from 10–14 November with total prize money of 100,000 US Dollars. Tournament consisted of total of three matches in every team encounter, with format of Men's singles, Men's doubles and a second Men's singles match. Countries participated in this tournaments were Indonesia, Malaysia, India, Thailand, South Korea, Chinese Taipei, Vietnam & China. Winning team & top seeded Indonesia got US$50,000 while runner-up Malaysian team got US$25,000. Third placed South Korean team got a total of US$15,000 and 4th ranked Chinese team bagged a total prize of US$10,000.

== Group results ==
=== Group A ===
1) South Korea V/s India

South Korea
3
Ho Chi Minh
10 November 1999

India
0

			1	2	3
1	(South Korea) (India)	Ahn Jae-chang; Abhinn Shyam Gupta	15; 6	15; 7
2	(South Korea) (India)	Ha Tae-kwon / Kim Dong-moon; Jaseel P. Ismail / Markose Bristow	15; 8	15; 1
3	(South Korea) (India)	Park Tae-sang; Ajit Wijetilek	9; 15	15; 4	15; 5

2) China V/s Vietnam

China
3
Ho Chi Minh
10 November 1999

Vietnam
0

			1	2	3
1	(China) (Vietnam)	Sun Jun; Hồ Văn Lợi	15; 3	15; 3
2	(China) (Vietnam)	Yu Jinhao / Zhang Jun; Hồ Văn Lợi / Nguyễn Anh Hoàng	15; 8	15; 7
3	(China) (Vietnam)	Chen Hong; Nguyễn Phú Cường	15; 10	15; 2

3) China V/s India

China
3
Ho Chi Minh
11 November 1999

India
0

			1	2	3
1	(China) (India)	Sun Jun; Abhinn Shyam Gupta	15; 8	6; 15	15; 5
2	(China) (India)	Yu Jinhao / Zhang Jun; Jaseel P. Ismail / Markose Bristow	15; 11	6; 15	15; 13
3	(China) (India)	Chen Hong; Ajit Wijetilek	15; 5	10; 15	15; 12

4) South Korea V/s Vietnam

South Korea
3
Ho Chi Minh
11 November 1999

Vietnam
0

			1	2	3
1	(South Korea) (Vietnam)	Ahn Jae-chang; Hồ Văn Lợi	15; 1	15; 7
2	(South Korea) (Vietnam)	Ha Tae-kwon / Kim Dong-moon; Nguyễn Phú Cường / Trần Duệ Sáng	15; 7	15; 7
3	(South Korea) (Vietnam)	Park Tae-sang; Nguyễn Phú Cường	15; 6	15; 3

5) China V/s South Korea

China
1
Ho Chi Minh
12 November 1999

South Korea
2

			1	2	3
1	(China) (South Korea)	Sun Jun; Ahn Jae-chang	17; 15	1; 15	15; 17
2	(China) (South Korea)	Yu Jinhao / Zhang Jun; Ha Tae-kwon / Kim Dong-moon	13; 15	15; 10	11; 15
3	(China) (South Korea)	Chen Hong; Park Tae-sang	15; 9	15; 12

6) India V/s Vietnam

India
3
Ho Chi Minh
12 November 1999

Vietnam
0

			1	2	3
1	(India) (Vietnam)	Abhinn Shyam Gupta; Hồ Văn Lợi	15; 9	15; 7
2	(India) (Vietnam)	Jaseel P. Ismail / Markose Bristow; Hồ Văn Lợi / Nguyễn Anh Hoàng	15; 11	15; 12
3	(India) (Vietnam)	Ajit Wijetilek; Nguyễn Phú Cường	14; 15	15; 5	15; 8

=== Group B ===
1) Malaysia V/s Thailand

Malaysia
2
Ho Chi Minh
10 November 1999

Thailand
1

			1	2	3
1	(Malaysia) (Thailand)	Jason Wong; Boonsak Ponsana	5; 15	15; 10	15; 13
2	(Malaysia) (Thailand)	Chew Choon Eng / Rosman Razak; Pramote Teerawiwatana / Tesana Panvisvas	6; 15	15; 6	11; 15
3	(Malaysia) (Thailand)	Ismail Saman; Anuphap Theeraratsakul	15; 6	15; 6

2) Indonesia vs Chinese Taipei

Indonesia
3
Ho Chi Minh
10 November 1999

Chinese Taipei
0

			1	2	3
1	(Indonesia) (Chinese Taipei)	Taufik Hidayat; Liu En-hung	15; 10	15; 2
2	(Indonesia) (Chinese Taipei)	Candra Wijaya / Tony Gunawan; Chien Yu-hsiu / Huang Shih-chung	15; 6	15; 4
3	(Indonesia) (Chinese Taipei)	Hendrawan; Chang Jeng-shyuang	15; 3	15; 11

3) Malaysia V/s Chinese Taipei

Malaysia
2
Ho Chi Minh
11 November 1999

Chinese Taipei
1

			1	2	3
1	(Malaysia) (Chinese Taipei)	Jason Wong; Liu En-hung	15; 7	7; 15	7; 15
2	(Malaysia) (Chinese Taipei)	Chew Choon Eng / Rosman Razak; Chien Yu-hsiu / Huang Shih-chung	15; 6	15; 6
3	(Malaysia) (Chinese Taipei)	Ismail Saman; Chang Jeng-shyuang	15; 6	15; 13

4) Indonesia vs Thailand

Indonesia
3
Ho Chi Minh
11 November 1999

Thailand
0

			1	2	3
1	(Indonesia) (Thailand)	Taufik Hidayat; Boonsak Ponsana	15; 6	17; 14
2	(Indonesia) (Thailand)	Candra Wijaya / Tony Gunawan; Pramote Teerawiwatana / Tesana Panvisvas	15; 11	15; 4
3	(Indonesia) (Thailand)	Hendrawan; Anuphap Theeraratsakul	15; 12	15; 11

5) Malaysia V/s Indonesia

Malaysia
0
Ho Chi Minh
12 November 1999

Indonesia
3

			1	2	3
1	(Malaysia) (Indonesia)	Jason Wong; Taufik Hidayat	12; 15	15; 13	8; 15
2	(Malaysia) (Indonesia)	Chew Choon Eng / Rosman Razak; Candra Wijaya / Tony Gunawan	5; 15	8; 15
3	(Malaysia) (Indonesia)	Ismail Saman; Hendrawan	9; 15	13; 15

6) Chinese Taipei V/s Thailand

Chinese Taipei
1
Ho Chi Minh
12 November 1999

Thailand
2

			1	2	3
1	(Chinese Taipei) (Thailand)	Liu En-hung; Boonsak Ponsana	15; 13	15; 5
2	(Chinese Taipei) (Thailand)	Chien Yu-hsiu / Huang Shih-chung; Pramote Teerawiwatana / Tesana Panvisvas	4; 15	12; 15
3	(Chinese Taipei) (Thailand)	Chang Jeng-shyuang; Anuphap Theeraratsakul	7; 15	7; 15

== Semifinals ==
1) Indonesia V/s China

Indonesia
3
Ho Chi Minh
13 November 1999

China
0

			1	2	3
1	(Indonesia) (China)	Taufik Hidayat; Sun Jun	15; 12	15; 14
2	(Indonesia) (China)	Tony Gunawan / Candra Wijaya; Zhang Jun / Yu Jinhao	15; 4	15; 6
3	(Indonesia) (China)	Hendrawan; Chen Hong	15; 7	15; 4

2) South Korea V/s Malaysia

South Korea
1
Ho Chi Minh
13 November 1999

Malaysia
2

			1	2	3
1	(South Korea) (Malaysia)	Ahn Jae-chang; Jason Wong	12; 15	15; 2	4; 15
2	(South Korea) (Malaysia)	Kim Dong-moon / Ha Tae-kwon; Rosman Razak / Chew Choon Eng	15; 10	15; 5
3	(South Korea) (Malaysia)	Park Tae-sang; Ismail Saman	12; 15	10; 15

== Final ==
Indonesia V/s Malaysia

Indonesia
3
Ho Chi Minh
14 November 1999

Malaysia
0

			1	2	3
1	(Indonesia) (Malaysia)	Taufik Hidayat; Jason Wong	15; 4	15; 0
2	(Indonesia) (Malaysia)	Tony Gunawan / Candra Wijaya; Rosman Razak / Chew Choon Eng	15; 9	15; 7
3	(Indonesia) (Malaysia)	Hendrawan; Ismail Saman	15; 5	15; 6

== Bronze medal tie ==
South Korea V/s China

South Korea
2
Ho Chi Minh
14 November 1999

China
1

			1	2	3
1	(South Korea) (China)	Ahn Jae-chang; Sun Jun	15; 2	5; 0
2	(South Korea) (China)	Kim Dong-moon / Ha Tae-kwon; Zhang Jun / Yu Jinhao	15; 5	15; 3
3	(South Korea) (China)	Park Tae-sang; Chen Hong	15; 12	7; 15	13; 15
