= Poul-Erik Høyer Larsen =

Danish badminton player

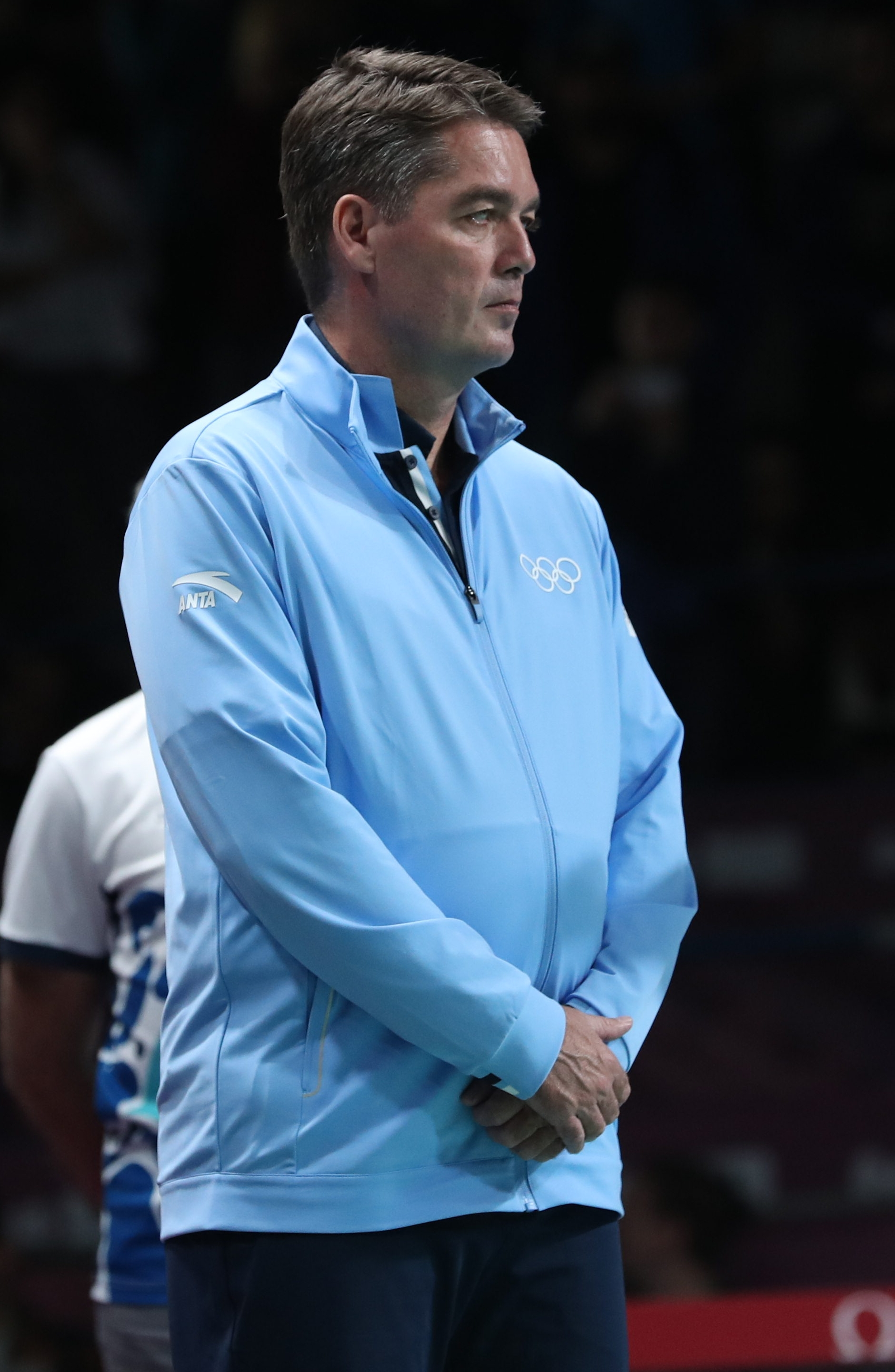
- Høyer Larsen in 2018

Personal information
- Born: 20 September 1965 (age 61) Helsinge, Denmark
- Height: 1.89 m (6 ft 2 in)

Sport
- Country: Denmark
- Sport: Badminton
- Handedness: Left
- Retired: 2000

Men's singles
- Career record: 398 wins, 93 losses
- Highest ranking: 1
Medal record
Men's badminton
Representing Denmark
Olympic Games
Gold medal – first place	1996 Atlanta	Men's Singles
World Championships
Bronze medal – third place	1995 Lausanne	Men's singles
Bronze medal – third place	1997 Glasgow	Men's singles
Bronze medal – third place	1999 Copenhagen	Men's singles
World Cup
Bronze medal – third place	1989 Guangzhou	Men's singles
Sudirman Cup
Bronze medal – third place	1991 Copenhagen	Mixed team
Bronze medal – third place	1993 Birmingham	Mixed team
Bronze medal – third place	1997 Glasgow	Mixed team
Thomas Cup
Silver medal – second place	1996 Hong Kong	Men's team
Bronze medal – third place	1990 Tokyo	Men's team
Bronze medal – third place	1998 Hong Kong	Men's team
Bronze medal – third place	2000 Kuala Lumpur	Men's team
European Championships
Gold medal – first place	1992 Glasgow	Men's singles
Gold medal – first place	1994 Den Bosch	Men's singles
Gold medal – first place	1996 Herning	Men's singles
Gold medal – first place	1990 Moscow	Mixed team
Gold medal – first place	1996 Herning	Mixed team
Gold medal – first place	1998 Sofia	Mixed team
Gold medal – first place	2000 Glasgow	Mixed team
Silver medal – second place	2000 Glasgow	Men's singles
Silver medal – second place	1992 Glasgow	Mixed team
Silver medal – second place	1994 Den Bosch	Mixed team
Bronze medal – third place	1990 Moscow	Men's singles
Bronze medal – third place	1998 Sofia	Men's singles

Poul-Erik Høyer Larsen (born 20 September 1965) is a retired Danish badminton player and sports administrator. As a player, he won major international singles titles in the 1990s, culminated in the gold medal at the 1996 Summer Olympics, and ranks among Denmark's badminton greats. In 2013, he became president of the Badminton World Federation, having served as president of the Badminton Europe for three years, and then served three four-year terms. In 2014, Høyer became a member of the International Olympic Committee (IOC), he was also a board member of the Danish Olympic Committee from 2005, from which he also retired from in 2025.

== Badminton career ==
Høyer Larsen competed in three Summer Olympics. In Barcelona 1992, he was defeated in quarterfinals by Ardy Wiranata. In Atlanta 1996, he won the gold medal in the men's singles after beating Dong Jiong in the final. In 2000 Summer Olympics in Sydney, he lost in the opening round.

He also won two All-England Open Badminton Championships in 1995 and 1996, and the European Badminton Championships in 1992, 1994 and 1996.

Høyer became president of Badminton Europe in 2010. In February 2007, he was nominated vice-president of the Danmarks Badminton Forbund. On 18 May 2013, Høyer was elected president of the Badminton World Federation. He served for another two four-year terms after winning reelection in 2017 and 2021. He retired from the presidency on 26 April 2025 and was replaced by Patama Leeswadtrakul.

== Achievements ==
=== Olympic Games ===
Men's singles
Year	Venue	Opponent	Score	Result
1996	Georgia State University Gymnasium; Atlanta, United States	(China) Dong Jiong	15–12, 15–10	Gold

=== World Championships ===
Men's singles
Year	Venue	Opponent	Score	Result
1995	Malley Sports Centre; Lausanne, Switzerland	(Indonesia) Hariyanto Arbi	10–15, 7–15	Bronze
1997	Scotstoun Centre; Glasgow, Scotland	(China) Sun Jun	7–15, 17–14, 9–15	Bronze
1999	Brøndby Arena; Copenhagen, Denmark	(China) Sun Jun	4–15, 6–15	Bronze

=== World Cup ===
Men's singles
Year	Venue	Opponent	Score	Result
1989	Guangzhou Gymnasium; Guangzhou, China	(Malaysia) Foo Kok Keong	7–15, 17–18	Bronze

=== European Championships ===
Men's singles
Year	Venue	Opponent	Score	Result
1990	Moscow, Soviet Union	(England) Steve Baddeley	10–15, 15–0, 11–15	Bronze
1992	Glasgow, Scotland	(Denmark) Thomas Stuer-Lauridsen	15–10, 15–10	Gold
1994	Den Bosch, Netherlands	(Sweden) Tomas Johansson	15–9, 15–5	Gold
1996	Herning, Denmark	(Denmark) Peter Rasmussen	15–5, 15–11	Gold
1998	Sofia, Bulgaria	(Denmark) Kenneth Jonassen	6–15, 6–15	Bronze
2000	Kelvin Hall International Sports Arena, Glasgow, Scotland	(Denmark) Peter Gade	5–15, 11–15	Silver

=== IBF World Grand Prix (22 titles, 17 runners-up) ===
The World Badminton Grand Prix sanctioned by International Badminton Federation (IBF) from 1983 to 2006.

Men's singles
Year	Tournament	Opponent	Score	Result
1986	Carlton Inter-sport Cup	(Australia) Sze Yu	2–15, 17–14, 15–11	(gold) Winner
1986	Scottish Open	(England) Steve Baddeley	4–15, 11–15	(silver) Runner-up
1987	Dutch Open	(England) Darren Hall	15–4, 15–1	(gold) Winner
1988	Denmark Open	(China) Zhang Qingwu	15–9, 18–16	(gold) Winner
1989	Poona Open	(Denmark) Michael Kjeldsen	15–10, 15–8	(gold) Winner
1989	French Open	(China) Xiong Guobao	7–15, 3–15	(silver) Runner-up
1990	Japan Open	(Denmark) Morten Frost	9–15, 4–15	(silver) Runner-up
1990	Swedish Open	(China) Liu Jun	8–15, 11–15	(silver) Runner-up
1990	Dutch Open	(Indonesia) Hermawan Susanto	10–15, 6–15	(silver) Runner-up
1990	Denmark Open	(Denmark) Morten Frost	4–15, 15–10, 17–15	(gold) Winner
1991	Dutch Open	(Indonesia) Hermawan Susanto	18–17, 6–15, 15–10	(gold) Winner
1991	German Open	(Indonesia) Hermawan Susanto	15–8, 15–8	(gold) Winner
1991	Denmark Open	(Indonesia) Hermawan Susanto	15–8, 12–15, 8–15	(silver) Runner-up
1992	Swedish Open	(Indonesia) Fung Permadi	18–15, 15–3	(gold) Winner
1992	Finnish Open	(Denmark) Thomas Stuer-Lauridsen	15–8, 15–8	(gold) Winner
1992	U.S. Open	(China) Liu Jun	15–7, 15–4	(gold) Winner
1992	Denmark Open	(England) Darren Hall	11–15, 13–18	(silver) Runner-up
1993	Swedish Open	(Denmark) Thomas Stuer-Lauridsen	7–15, 17–14, 13–15	(silver) Runner-up
1993	Dutch Open	(Indonesia) Alan Budi Kusuma	11–15, 15–5, 15–11	(gold) Winner
1993	Denmark Open	(Sweden) Jens Olsson	15–11, 15–2	(gold) Winner
1994	Swiss Open	(Denmark) Thomas Stuer-Lauridsen	18–17, 16–17, 3–15	(silver) Runner-up
1994	Dutch Open	(Denmark) Peter Rasmussen	15–7, 15–7	(gold) Winner
1994	German Open	(Sweden) Jens Olsson	15–3, 15–9	(gold) Winner
1994	Denmark Open	(Indonesia) Alan Budi Kusuma	17–18, 15–4, 15–10	(gold) Winner
1995	All England Open	(Indonesia) Hariyanto Arbi	17–16, 15–6	(gold) Winner
1995	Russian Open	(Indonesia) Hendrawan	14–17, 11–15	(silver) Runner-up
1995	Denmark Open	(Indonesia) Hendrawan	17–18, 17–14, 17–15	(gold) Winner
1995	German Open	(Indonesia) Joko Suprianto	14–17, 11–15	(silver) Runner-up
1995	China Open	(China) Dong Jiong	8–15, 9–15	(silver) Runner-up
1996	Swiss Open	(Sweden) Thomas Johansson	15–9, 16–17, 15–10	(gold) Winner
1996	All England Open	(Malaysia) Rashid Sidek	15–7, 15–6	(gold) Winner
1996	U.S. Open	(Indonesia) Joko Suprianto	13–15, 13–15	(silver) Runner-up
1996	Dutch Open	(China) Sun Jun	1–15, 1–15	(silver) Runner-up
1997	Chinese Taipei Open	(Denmark) Peter Gade	10–15, 15–18	(silver) Runner-up
1997	Swiss Open	(China) Dong Jiong	15–17, 11–15	(silver) Runner-up
1997	Russian Open	(Denmark) Kenneth Jonassen	15–2, 15–2	(gold) Winner
1997	U.S. Open	(Denmark) Peter Gade	15–6, 7–15, 15–2	(gold) Winner
1997	German Open	(Denmark) Peter Gade	15–12, 12–15, 12–15	(silver) Runner-up
1999	Denmark Open	(Malaysia) Wong Choong Hann	17–15, 15–4	(gold) Winner

=== IBF International (2 titles, 1 runner-up) ===
Men's singles
Year	Tournament	Opponent	Score	Result
1990	Nordic Championships	(Sweden) Peter Axelsson	15–6, 15–6	(gold) Winner
1990	Wimbledon Tournament	(England) Anders Nielsen	15–7, 15–9	(gold) Winner
1992	Nordic Championships	(Denmark) Thomas Stuer-Lauridsen	6–15, 9–15	(silver) Runner-up

=== Invitation tournament (1 title, 4 runners-up) ===
Men's singles
Year	Tournament	Opponent	Score	Result
1993	Copenhagen Masters	(Denmark) Thomas Stuer-Lauridsen	10–15, 5–15	(silver) Runner-up
1994	Copenhagen Masters	(Indonesia) Hariyanto Arbi	16–18, 13–18	(silver) Runner-up
1995	Copenhagen Masters	(Sweden) Jens Olsson	15–12, 10–15, 10–15	(silver) Runner-up
1996	Copenhagen Masters	(China) Hu Zhilan	15–10, 15–10	(gold) Winner
1999	Copenhagen Masters	(Denmark) Peter Gade	11–15, 11–15	(silver) Runner-up

== Personal life ==
Høyer married his long-time girlfriend Heidi in 1993 after a six-year engagement. They have two sons, Lasse and Mikkel. In September 2020, he confirmed that he was diagnosed with Parkinson's disease.
