= Thomas Stuer-Lauridsen =

Danish badminton player

Personal information
- Born: 29 April 1971 (age 55) Hørsholm Municipality, Denmark
- Height: 191 cm (6 ft 3 in)
- Weight: 78 kg (172 lb)

Sport
- Country: Denmark
- Sport: Badminton
- Handedness: Right
- Event: Men's singles
Medal record
Men's badminton
Representing Denmark
Olympic Games
Bronze medal – third place	1992 Barcelona	Men's singles
World Championships
Bronze medal – third place	1993 Birmingham	Men's singles
Bronze medal – third place	1995 Lausanne	Men's singles
World Cup
Silver medal – second place	1994 Ho Chi Minh City	Men's singles
Sudirman Cup
Bronze medal – third place	1991 Copenhagen	Mixed team
Bronze medal – third place	1993 Birmingham	Mixed team
Bronze medal – third place	1995 Lausanne	Mixed team
Bronze medal – third place	1997 Glasgow	Mixed team
Thomas Cup
Silver medal – second place	1996 Hong Kong	Men's team
Bronze medal – third place	1998 Hong Kong	Men's team
European Championships
Silver medal – second place	1992 Glasgow	Men's singles
Silver medal – second place	1992 Glasgow	Mixed team
European Junior Championships
Gold medal – first place	1989 Manchester	Boys' singles
Gold medal – first place	1989 Manchester	Mixed team
Gold medal – first place	1989 Manchester	Boys' doubles

Thomas Stuer-Lauridsen (born 29 April 1971) is a Danish badminton player.

== Career ==
Stuer-Lauridsen won bronze in the 1992 Olympic Games. He also played at the 1996 Summer Olympics, where he was the flag-bearer of Denmark.

== Achievements ==
=== Olympic Games ===
Men's singles
Year	Venue	Opponent	Score	Result
1992	Pavelló de la Mar Bella; Barcelona, Spain	(Indonesia) Alan Budikusuma	10–15, 12–15	Bronze

=== World Championships ===
Men's singles
Year	Venue	Opponent	Score	Result
1993	National Indoor Arena; Birmingham, England	(Indonesia) Hermawan Susanto	15–10, 2–15, 10–15	Bronze
1995	Malley Sports Centre; Lausanne, Switzerland	(South Korea) Park Sung-woo	15–8, 5–0, retired	Bronze

=== World Cup ===
Men's singles
Year	Venue	Opponent	Score	Result
1994	Phan Đình Phùng Indoor Stadium; Ho Chi Minh City, Vietnam	(Indonesia) Hariyanto Arbi	7–9, retired	Silver

=== European Championships ===
Men's singles
Year	Venue	Opponent	Score	Result
1992	Kelvin Hall International Sports Arena; Glasgow, Scotland	(Denmark) Poul-Erik Høyer Larsen	10–15, 10–15	Silver

=== European Junior Championships ===
Men's singles
Year	Venue	Opponent	Score	Result
1989	Armitage Centre; Manchester, England	(Denmark) Morten Hummelmose	15–5, 15–1	Gold

Men's doubles
Year	Venue	Partner	Opponent	Score	Result
1989	Armitage Centre; Manchester, England	(Denmark) Christian Jakobsen	(England) Anthony Bush (England) Ashley Spencer	15–6, 12–15, 15–9	Gold

=== IBF World Grand Prix ===
The World Badminton Grand Prix sanctioned by International Badminton Federation (IBF) from 1983 to 2006.

Men's singles
Year	Tournament	Opponent	Score	Result
1992	Finnish Open	(Denmark) Poul-Erik Høyer Larsen	8–15, 8–15	(silver) Runner-up
1992	Malaysia Open	(Malaysia) Rashid Sidek	5–15, 7–15	(silver) Runner-up
1993	Chinese Taipei Open	(Indonesia) Hariyanto Arbi	18–15, 6–15, 5–15	(silver) Runner-up
1993	Korea Open	(Indonesia) Joko Suprianto	3–15, 13–18	(silver) Runner-up
1993	Swedish Open	(Denmark) Poul-Erik Høyer Larsen	15–7, 14–17, 15–13	(gold) Winner
1993	Hong Kong Open	(Indonesia) Hermawan Susanto	7–15, 4–15	(silver) Runner-up
1993	Scottish Open	(England) Steve Butler	12–15, 10–15	(silver) Runner-up
1993	German Open	(Indonesia) Alan Budikusuma	15–5, 15–2	(gold) Winner
1993	Canada Open	(Denmark) Peter Espersen	15–12, 15–9	(gold) Winner
1994	Chinese Taipei Open	(Indonesia) Hariyanto Arbi	3–15, 2–15	(silver) Runner-up
1994	Swiss Open	(Denmark) Poul-Erik Høyer Larsen	17–18, 17–16, 15–3	(gold) Winner
1994	U.S. Open	(Indonesia) Lioe Tiong Ping	Walkover	(gold) Winner
1996	Denmark Open	(Malaysia) Ong Ewe Hock	6–15, 15–7, 15–12	(gold) Winner
1997	Korea Open	(South Korea) Park Sung-woo	15–12, 15–10	(gold) Winner
1997	Hong Kong Open	(Denmark) Peter Gade	15–7, 6–15, 4–15	(silver) Runner-up
1999	Korea Open	(Chinese Taipei) Fung Permadi	14–17, 6–15	(silver) Runner-up

Men's doubles
Year	Tournament	Partner	Opponent	Score	Result
1990	Denmark Open	(Denmark) Jesper Knudsen	(China) Li Yongbo (China) Tian Bingyi	8–15, 6–15	(silver) Runner-up

=== IBF International ===
Men's singles
Year	Tournament	Opponent	Score	Result
1989	Russian Open	(Soviet Union) Andrey Antropov	16–17, 15–6, 11–15	(silver) Runner-up
1989	Norwegian International	(Denmark) Michael Søgaard	18–15, 15–10	(gold) Winner
1989	Czechoslovakian International	(Czech Republic) Tomasz Mendrek	15–2, 15–5	(gold) Winner
1992	Nordic Championships	(Denmark) Poul-Erik Høyer Larsen	15–6, 15–9	(gold) Winner
1995	Nordic Championships	(Sweden) Jens Olsson	15–8, 15–4	(gold) Winner

Men's doubles
Year	Tournament	Partner	Opponent	Score	Result
1990	Czechoslovakian International	(Denmark) Christian Jakobsen	(Soviet Union) Igor Dmitriev (Soviet Union) Mikhail Korshuk	15–8, 15–9	(gold) Winner
1990	Polish Open	(Denmark) Christian Jakobsen	(Malaysia) Yap Yee Guan (Malaysia) Yap Yee Hup	15–10, 12–15, 15–5	(gold) Winner
1990	Nordic Championships	(Denmark) Max Gandrup	(Denmark) Jon Holst-Christensen (Denmark) Thomas Lund	18–13, 8–15, 15–10	(gold) Winner

Mixed doubles
Year	Tournament	Partner	Opponent	Score	Result
1989	Norwegian International	(Denmark) Lotte Olsen	(Denmark) Lars Pedersen (Denmark) Anne Mette Bille	15–9, 15–7	(gold) Winner

=== Invitation tournament ===
Men's singles
Year	Tournament	Opponent	Score	Result
1993	Copenhagen Masters	(Denmark) Poul-Erik Høyer Larsen	15–10, 15–5	(gold) Winner
