= Liu Jun (badminton) =

Chinese badminton player

Liu Jun 刘军
Personal information
- Born: 9 November 1968 (age 58) Jiangxi, China
- Height: 1.85 m (6 ft 1 in)
- Weight: 72 kg (159 lb; 11.3 st)

Sport
- Country: China
- Sport: Badminton
- Handedness: Right
Medal record
Men's badminton
Representing China
World Championships
Bronze medal – third place	1991 Copenhagen	Men's singles
World Cup
Bronze medal – third place	1991 Macau	Men's singles
Sudirman Cup
Bronze medal – third place	1993 Birmingham	Mixed team
Thomas Cup
Bronze medal – third place	1992 Kuala Lumpur	Team
Bronze medal – third place	1994 Jakarta	Team
Asian Championships
Gold medal – first place	1989 Shanghai	Men's team
Silver medal – second place	1994 Shanghai	Men's singles
Silver medal – second place	1993 Hong Kong	Men's team
East Asian Games
Gold medal – first place	1993 Shanghai	Men's singles
Gold medal – first place	1993 Shanghai	Men's team

Liu Jun (simplified Chinese: 刘军; traditional Chinese: 劉軍; pinyin: Liú Jūn; born 9 November 1968) is a male singles badminton player from China.

== Career ==
He come from Jiangxi, China and joined the national team in 1987. Liu won the All England men's singles crown in 1992. He also participated in the 1991 and 1993 World Championships, the 1992 Olympic Games and the 1992 and 1994 Thomas Cup during his career. Liu left the national team in 1994.

== Achievements ==
=== World Championships ===
Men's singles
Year	Venue	Opponent	Score	Result
1991	Brøndby Arena; Copenhagen, Denmark	(Indonesia) Alan Budikusuma	11–15, 11–15	Bronze

=== World Cup ===
Men's singles
Year	Venue	Opponent	Score	Result
1991	Macau Forum, Macau	(China) Zhao Jianhua	10–15, 12–15	Bronze

=== Asian Championships ===
Men's singles
Year	Venue	Opponent	Score	Result
1994	Shanghai Gymnasium; Shanghai, China	(Malaysia) Foo Kok Keong	13-15, 15–9, 3–15	Silver

=== East Asian Games ===
Men's singles
Year	Venue	Opponent	Score	Result
1993	Shanghai, China	(South Korea) Lee Gwang-jin	15–9, 15–9	Gold

=== IBF World Grand Prix ===
The World Badminton Grand Prix sanctioned by International Badminton Federation (IBF) from 1983 to 2006.

Men's singles
Year	Tournament	Opponent	Score	Result
1990	Swedish Open	(Denmark) Poul-Erik Høyer Larsen	15–8, 15–11	(gold) Winner
1991	Finnish Open	(China) Chen Rong	15–3, 15–2	(gold) Winner
1991	Hong Kong Open	(China) Wu Wenkai	15–10, 15–10	(gold) Winner
1992	All England Open	(China) Zhao Jianhua	15–13, 15–13	(gold) Winner
1992	U.S. Open	(Denmark) Poul-Erik Høyer Larsen	7–15, 4–15	(silver) Runner-up
1992	Canada Open	(South Korea) Ahn Jae-chang	13–15, 7–15	(silver) Runner-up
