= Ahn Jae-chang =

South Korean badminton player (born 1972)

Personal information
- Born: 1 October 1972 (age 54)
- Height: 1.82 m (6 ft 0 in)

Sport
- Country: South Korea
- Sport: Badminton
- Handedness: Right
- BWF profile
Medal record
Men's badminton
Representing South Korea
Sudirman Cup
Gold medal – first place	1991 Copenhagen	Mixed team
Silver medal – second place	1989 Jakarta	Mixed team
Bronze medal – third place	1999 Copenhagen	Mixed team
Thomas Cup
Bronze medal – third place	1992 Kuala Lumpur	Men's team
Bronze medal – third place	1994 Jakarta	Men's team
Bronze medal – third place	1996 Hong Kong	Men's team
Bronze medal – third place	2000 Kuala Lumpur	Men's team
Asian Games
Silver medal – second place	1994 Hiroshima	Men's team
Bronze medal – third place	1990 Beijing	Men's team
Bronze medal – third place	1998 Bangkok	Men's team
Asia Cup
Bronze medal – third place	1999 Ho Chi Minh	Men's team

Ahn Jae-chang (Korean: 안재창, born 1 October 1972) is a retired badminton player from South Korea.

Ahn in his playing career won the Hungarian International and the Canada Open. He was also part of the Korean team that won the World mixed team championships in 1991 by defeating defending champions Indonesia in the final and has represented his country in many other team competitions. After his playing career he coached Korean players team at the Youth team and National team and finally became the head coach in late 2018. He also served as the head coach of the Incheon Airport Skymons pro team before.

== Achievements ==
=== World Junior Championships ===
The Bimantara World Junior Championships was an international invitation badminton tournament for junior players. It was held in Jakarta, Indonesia from 1987 to 1991.

Boys' doubles
Year	Venue	Partner	Opponent	Score	Result
1987	Jakarta, Indonesia	(South Korea) Choi Sang-bum	(China) Jin Feng (China) Wu Wenkai	15–6, 3–15, 2–15	Silver

Mixed doubles
Year	Venue	Partner	Opponent	Score	Result
1987	Jakarta, Indonesia	(South Korea) Gil Young-ah	(Indonesia) Ricky Subagja (Indonesia) Lilik Sudarwati	12–15, 15–4, 15–17	Bronze

=== IBF World Grand Prix ===
The World Badminton Grand Prix sanctioned by International Badminton Federation (IBF) from 1983 to 2006.

Men's singles
Year	Tournament	Opponent	Score	Result
1992	Canadian Open	(China) Liu Jun	15–13, 15–7	(gold) Winner
1995	Canadian Open	(South Korea) Lee Gwang-jin	15–11, 13–15, 8–15	(silver) Runner-up

Men's doubles
Year	Tournament	Partner	Opponent	Score	Result
1992	Canadian Open	(South Korea) Choi Ji-tae	(Malaysia) Cheah Soon Kit (Malaysia) Soo Beng Kiang	4–15, 4–15	(silver) Runner-up

=== IBF International ===
Men's singles
Year	Tournament	Opponent	Score	Result
1990	Hungarian International	(South Korea) Lee Gwang-jin	18–15, 15–6	(gold) Winner

Men's doubles
Year	Tournament	Partner	Opponent	Score	Result
1990	Hungarian International	(South Korea) Lee Gwang-jin	(South Korea) Lee Sang-bok (South Korea) Shon Jin-hwan	14–17, 9–15	(silver) Runner-up
