= 1992 Thomas & Uber Cup =

Biennial international badminton team championship

1992 Thomas & Uber Cup Piala Thomas dan Uber 1992

Tournament details
- Dates: 5–16 May 1992
- Edition: 17th (Thomas Cup); 14th (Uber Cup)
- Level: International
- Nations: 8 (Thomas Cup); 8 (Uber Cup)
- Venue: Stadium Negara
- Location: Kuala Lumpur, Malaysia
- Official website: bwfthomasubercups.com

The 1992 Thomas & Uber Cup was the 17th tournament of the Thomas Cup, and the 14th tournament of the Uber Cup, which are the major international team competitions in world badminton. The 1992 final stage was held in Kuala Lumpur, Malaysia, on May 16, 1992.

China were the defending champions for both the Thomas Cup and the Uber Cup.

== Host selection ==
Kuala Lumpur was named as the host in October 1990 during an IBF Council meeting in Bangkok, Thailand. Indonesia and China also submitted their bids to host the tournaments but did not succeed. However, Indonesia earned the right to host the 1994 Thomas & Uber Cup in Jakarta.

== Qualification ==
Malaysia qualified automatically as hosts, while China qualified as the trophy holder.

=== Thomas Cup ===
Means of qualification	Date	Venue	Slot	Qualified teams
Host country	22 October 1990	Bangkok	1	Malaysia
1990 Thomas Cup	23 May – 3 June 1990	Tokyo	1	China
European Zone	20 – 22 February 1992	's-Hertogenbosch	3	Denmark
European Zone	20 – 22 February 1992	's-Hertogenbosch	3	England
European Zone	20 – 22 February 1992	's-Hertogenbosch	3	Sweden
Australasian Zone	20 – 22 February 1992	Hong Kong	3	Indonesia
Australasian Zone	20 – 22 February 1992	Hong Kong	3	South Korea
Australasian Zone	20 – 22 February 1992	Hong Kong	3	Thailand
Total			8	

=== Uber Cup ===
Means of qualification	Date	Venue	Slot	Qualified teams
Host country	22 October 1990	Bangkok	1	Malaysia
1990 Uber Cup	23 May – 3 June 1990	Tokyo	1	China
European Zone	20 – 22 February 1992	's-Hertogenbosch	3	England
European Zone	20 – 22 February 1992	's-Hertogenbosch	3	Netherlands
European Zone	20 – 22 February 1992	's-Hertogenbosch	3	Sweden
Australasian Zone	20 – 22 February 1992	Hong Kong	3	Indonesia
Australasian Zone	20 – 22 February 1992	Hong Kong	3	South Korea
Australasian Zone	20 – 22 February 1992	Hong Kong	3	Japan
Total			8	

== Medal summary ==
=== Medalists ===
Event	Gold	Silver	Bronze
Thomas Cup	Malaysia	Indonesia	China
Thomas Cup	Malaysia	Indonesia	South Korea
Uber Cup	China	South Korea	Sweden
Uber Cup	China	South Korea	Indonesia

=== Medal table ===
* Host nation (Malaysia)

Rank	Nation	Gold	Silver	Bronze	Total
1	China	1	0	1	2
2	Malaysia*	1	0	0	1
3	Indonesia	0	1	1	2
3	South Korea	0	1	1	2
5	Sweden	0	0	1	1
Totals (5 entries)		2	2	4	8

== Thomas Cup ==
=== Group stage ===
==== Group A ====
Pos	Team	Pld	W	L	GF	GA	GD	PF	PA	PD	Pts	Qualification
1	China	3	3	0	30	1	+29	467	214	+253	3	Advance to semi-finals
2	Indonesia	3	2	1	18	14	+4	374	305	+69	2	Advance to semi-finals
3	Sweden	3	1	2	11	25	−14	347	486	−139	1	
4	Thailand	3	0	3	8	27	−19	289	472	−183	0	

Source: The Straits Times

5 May 1992
19:00 UTC+8

Indonesia	4–1	Sweden
Report

Stadium Negara, Kuala Lumpur

6 May 1992
19:00 UTC+8

China	5–0	Thailand
Report

Stadium Negara, Kuala Lumpur

7 May 1992
19:00 UTC+8

Indonesia	4–1	Thailand
Report

Stadium Negara, Kuala Lumpur

8 May 1992
19:00 UTC+8

China	5–0	Sweden
Report

Stadium Negara, Kuala Lumpur

9 May 1992
19:00 UTC+8

Thailand	2–3	Sweden
Report

Stadium Negara, Kuala Lumpur

10 May 1992
19:00 UTC+8

China	5–0	Indonesia
Report

Stadium Negara, Kuala Lumpur

==== Group B ====
Pos	Team	Pld	W	L	GF	GA	GD	PF	PA	PD	Pts	Qualification
1	South Korea	3	3	0	18	16	+2	389	360	+29	3	Advance to semi-finals
2	Malaysia (H)	3	2	1	26	7	+19	467	298	+169	2	Advance to semi-finals
3	England	3	1	2	11	24	−13	335	462	−127	1	
4	Denmark	3	0	3	12	20	−8	330	401	−71	0	

Source: The Straits Times
(H) Host

5 May 1992
19:00 UTC+8

Malaysia	5–0	England
Report

Stadium Negara, Kuala Lumpur

6 May 1992
19:00 UTC+8

South Korea	2–3	Denmark
Report

Stadium Negara, Kuala Lumpur

7 May 1992
19:00 UTC+8

Malaysia	2–3	South Korea
Report

Stadium Negara, Kuala Lumpur

8 May 1992
19:00 UTC+8

Denmark	2–3	England
Report

Stadium Negara, Kuala Lumpur

9 May 1992
19:00 UTC+8

South Korea	4–1	England
Report

Stadium Negara, Kuala Lumpur

10 May 1992
19:00 UTC+8

Malaysia	5–0	Denmark
Report

Stadium Negara, Kuala Lumpur

=== Knockout stage ===
==== Bracket ====
Semi-finals
China	2
Malaysia	3
Indonesia	5
South Korea	0

Final
Malaysia	3
Indonesia	2

==== Semi-finals ====
12 May 1992
19:00 UTC+8

China	2–3	Malaysia
Report

Stadium Negara, Kuala Lumpur

13 May 1992
19:00 UTC+8

Indonesia	5–0	South Korea
Report

Stadium Negara, Kuala Lumpur

==== Final ====
16 May 1992
19:00 UTC+8

Indonesia	2–3	Malaysia
Report

Stadium Negara, Kuala Lumpur

1992 Thomas Cup winner

Malaysia
Fifth title

== Uber Cup ==
=== Group stage ===
==== Group A ====
Pos	Team	Pld	W	L	GF	GA	GD	PF	PA	PD	Pts	Qualification
1	China	3	3	0	28	4	+24	395	176	+219	3	Advance to semi-finals
2	Indonesia	3	2	1	24	8	+16	371	197	+174	2	Advance to semi-finals
3	Malaysia (H)	3	1	2	8	23	−15	174	323	−149	1	
4	Netherlands	3	0	3	3	28	−25	127	371	−244	0	

Source: The Straits Times
(H) Host

5 May 1992
19:00 UTC+8

China	5–0	Malaysia
Report

Stadium Negara, Kuala Lumpur

6 May 1992
19:00 UTC+8

Indonesia	5–0	Netherlands
Report

Stadium Negara, Kuala Lumpur

7 May 1992
19:00 UTC+8

China	5–0	Netherlands
Report

Stadium Negara, Kuala Lumpur

8 May 1992
19:00 UTC+8

Indonesia	5–0	Malaysia
Report

Stadium Negara, Kuala Lumpur

9 May 1992
19:00 UTC+8

Malaysia	4–1	Netherlands
Report

Stadium Negara, Kuala Lumpur

10 May 1992
19:00 UTC+8

China	4–1	Indonesia
Report

Stadium Negara, Kuala Lumpur

==== Group B ====
Pos	Team	Pld	W	L	GF	GA	GD	PF	PA	PD	Pts	Qualification
1	South Korea	3	3	0	29	8	+21	412	229	+183	3	Advance to semi-finals
2	Sweden	3	2	1	19	19	0	361	359	+2	2	Advance to semi-finals
3	Japan	3	1	2	9	23	−14	241	352	−111	1	
4	England	3	0	3	14	22	−8	322	395	−73	0	

Source: The Straits Times

5 May 1992
19:00 UTC+8

South Korea	5–0	Japan
Report

Stadium Negara, Kuala Lumpur

6 May 1992
19:00 UTC+8

Sweden	3–2	England
Report

Stadium Negara, Kuala Lumpur

7 May 1992
19:00 UTC+8

South Korea	5–0	England
Report

Stadium Negara, Kuala Lumpur

8 May 1992
19:00 UTC+8

Sweden	4–1	Japan
Report

Stadium Negara, Kuala Lumpur

9 May 1992
19:00 UTC+8

England	2–3	Japan
Report

Stadium Negara, Kuala Lumpur

10 May 1992
19:00 UTC+8

South Korea	4–1	Sweden
Report

Stadium Negara, Kuala Lumpur

=== Knockout stage ===
==== Bracket ====
Semi-finals
China	5
Sweden	0
Indonesia	1
South Korea	4

Final
China	3
South Korea	2

==== Semi-finals ====
12 May 1992
19:00 UTC+8

China	5–0	Sweden
Report

Stadium Negara, Kuala Lumpur

13 May 1992
19:00 UTC+8

South Korea	4–1	Indonesia
Report

Stadium Negara, Kuala Lumpur

==== Final ====
15 May 1992
19:00 UTC+8

South Korea	2–3	China
Report

Stadium Negara, Kuala Lumpur

1992 Uber Cup winner

China
Fifth title
