= Lee Gwang-jin =

South Korean badminton player

Personal information
- Born: 5 December 1970 (age 55)
- Height: 1.75 m (5 ft 9 in)

Sport
- Country: South Korea
- Sport: Badminton
- Handedness: Left
- BWF profile
Medal record
Men's badminton
Representing South Korea
Sudirman Cup
Gold medal – first place	1991 Copenhagen	Mixed team
Silver medal – second place	1989 Jakarta	Mixed team
Thomas Cup
Bronze medal – third place	1994 Jakarta	Men's team
Bronze medal – third place	1996 Hong Kong	Men's team
Asian Games
Silver medal – second place	1994 Hiroshima	Men's team
Bronze medal – third place	1990 Beijing	Men's team
East Asian Games
Silver medal – second place	1993 Shanghai	Men's singles
Bronze medal – third place	1993 Shanghai	Men's team

Korean name
- Hangul: 이광진
- RR: I Gwangjin
- MR: I Kwangjin

Lee Gwang-jin (Korean: 이광진; born 5 December 1970) is a South Korean badminton player. He competed at the 1988 Summer Olympics, 1992 Summer Olympics and the 1996 Summer Olympics.

== Achievements ==
=== Olympic Games (Exhibition) ===
Men's doubles
Year	Venue	Partner	Opponent	Score	Result
1988	Seoul National University Gymnasium, Seoul, South Korea	(South Korea) Lee Sang-bok	(China) Li Yongbo (China) Tian Bingyi	11–15, 7–15	Silver

=== East Asian Games ===
Men's singles
Year	Venue	Opponent	Score	Result
1993	Shanghai, China	(China) Liu Jun	9–15, 9–15	Silver

=== IBF World Grand Prix ===
The World Badminton Grand Prix sanctioned by International Badminton Federation (IBF) from 1983 to 2006.

Men's singles

Year	Tournament	Opponent	Score	Result
1995	Chinese Taipei Open	(Indonesia) Hermawan Susanto	2–15, 13–18	(silver) Runner-up
1995	Canadian Open	(South Korea) Ahn Jae-chang	11–15, 15–13, 15–8	(gold) Winner
1996	Korea Open	(South Korea) Kim Hak-kyun	5–15, 5–15	(silver) Runner-up

Men's doubles
Year	Tournament	Partner	Opponent	Score	Result
1988	Hong Kong Open	(South Korea) Lee Sang-bok	(Thailand) Sawei Chanseorasmee (Thailand) Sakrapee Thongsari	15–5, 17–14	(gold) Winner

=== IBF International ===
Men's singles
Year	Tournament	Opponent	Score	Result
1990	Hungarian International	(South Korea) Ahn Jae-chang	15–18, 6–15	(silver) Runner-up

Men's doubles
Year	Tournament	Partner	Opponent	Score	Result
1990	Hungarian International	(South Korea) Ahn Jae-chang	(South Korea) Lee Sang-bok (South Korea) Shon Jin-hwan	14–17, 9–15	(silver) Runner-up
