= CIG de Malley =

Indoor arena in Lausanne, Switzerland

- CIG, Patinoire de Malley
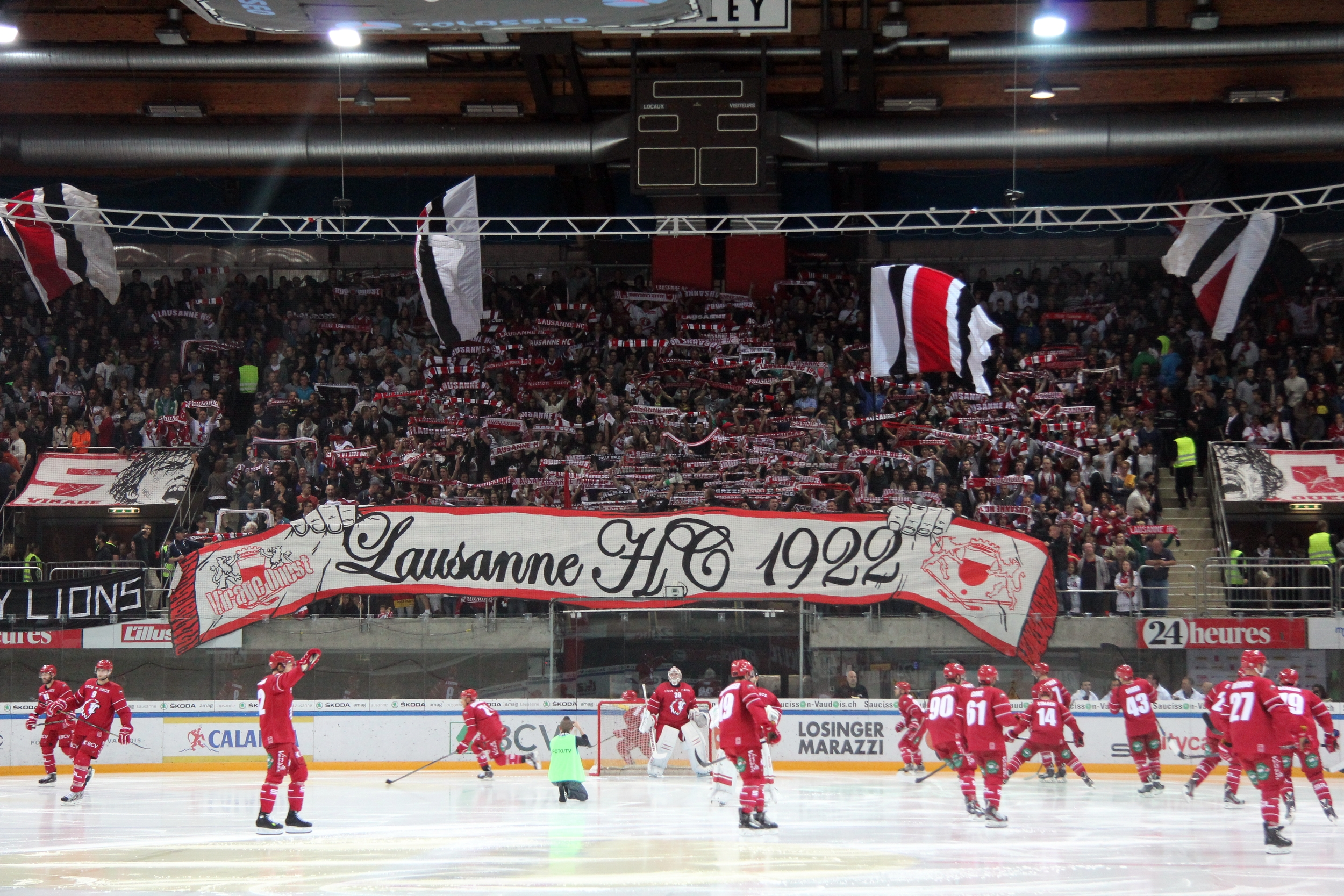
- Interactive map of CIG de Malley
- Location: Chemin du Viaduc 14 1008 Prilly; Lausanne, Switzerland
- Coordinates: 46°31′43.38″N 6°36′0.40″E
- Capacity: Ice hockey: 7,600; Tennis: 6,237

Construction
- Opened: 1984
- Closed: April 2017
- Demolished: April 2017

Tenants
- HC Lausanne (1984–2017); Davis Cup (Switzerland-Belgium) (2008)

Centre intercommunal de glace de Malley (abbreviation CIG de Malley or CIGM) was an indoor arena located in Lausanne, Switzerland. It was primarily used for ice hockey, and was the home arena of the HC Lausanne from 1984 to 2017. It was demolished in April 2017 to be replaced by the Vaudoise Aréna which opened in September 2019. A temporary ice rink, Malley 2.0, was opened during the interim and is one of the venues for the 2020 Winter Youth Olympics.

== History ==
The CIG de Malley opened in 1984 and had a capacity of 9,000 people, although because most of the arena consisted of terraces a maximum of 12,000 people could attend the games.

The arena hosted the European champions cup final on April 2, 1987, in which Tracer Milano prevailed over Maccabi Tel Aviv 71-69 in front of 10,500 spectators. Other important basketball matches hosted at the Malley include the 1994 and 2000 Saporta Cup finals.

The CIGM hosted the 1997 World Artistic Gymnastics Championships as well as the 1990 and 2008 European Men's Artistic Gymnastics Championships.

It also hosted the Grand Prix of skateboarding in 1996, 1998, 2000 and 2002.

=== Malley 2.0 ===
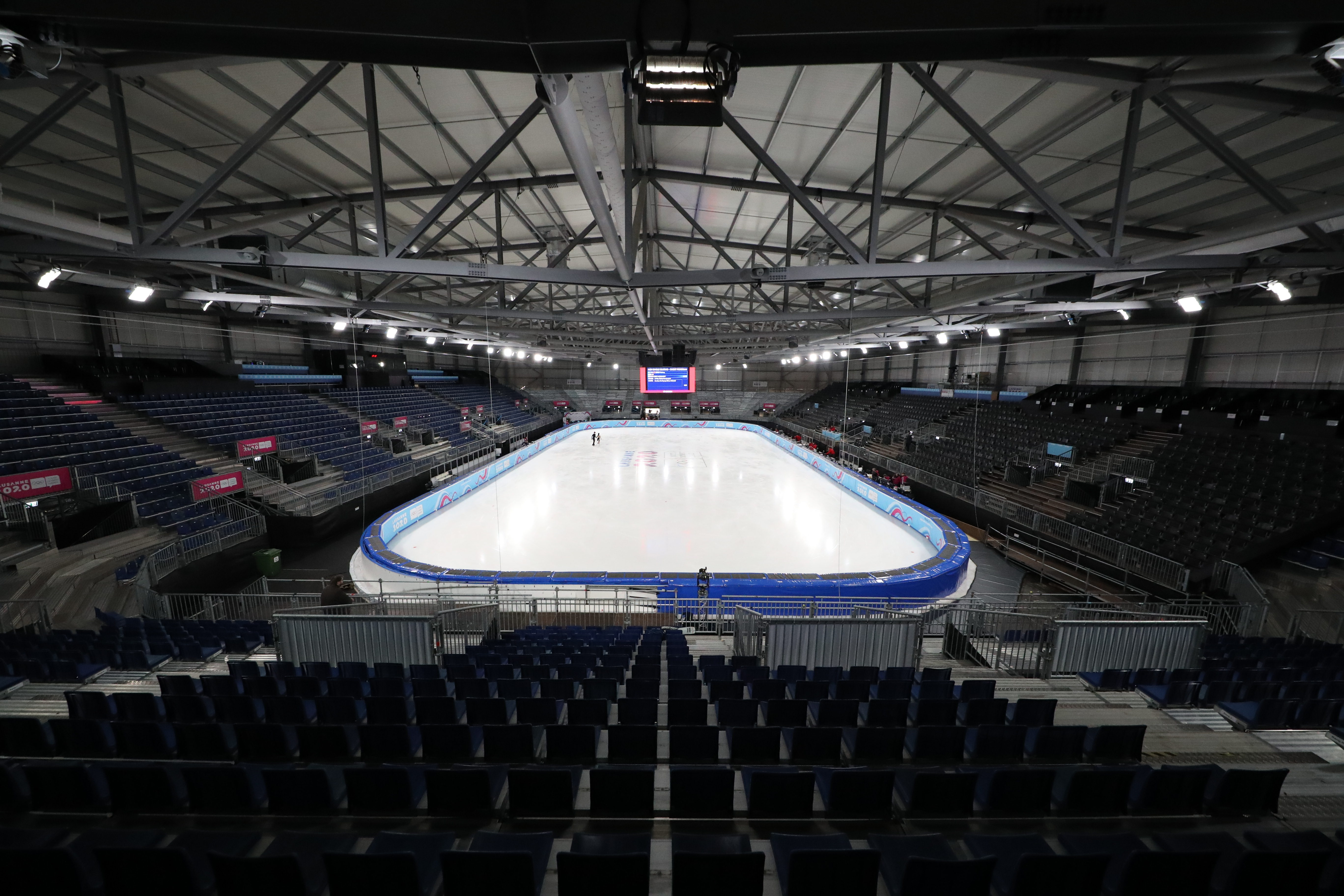
Temporary skating arena (January 2020)

Following the announcement that a new ice rink was to be built, the main venue was demolished. Until the opening of the new ice stadium, the hockey club held its training sessions and home games in the 2017–18 and 2018–19 seasons at the temporary 6,700-capacity ice rink called "Malley 2.0", which was built in seven months. The construction is 96 meters long, 66 meters wide, 17 meters high and cost CHF 10.6 million. Constructed by the Nussli Group, it is the largest temporary ice hockey arena in the world.

During the 2020 Winter Youth Olympic Games, the figure skating and short track speed skating competitions take place in the arena (credited as Lausanne Skating Arena). After the games, the temporary arena will continue to host hockey matches until April 2020 before being demolished and sold.

== See also ==
- List of indoor arenas in Switzerland

Preceded by Budapest Sportcsarnok; Budapest	FIBA European Champions Cup; Final Venue; 1987	Succeeded by Flanders Expo; Ghent
Preceded by PalaRuffini; Turin	FIBA European Cup; Final Venue; 1994	Succeeded by Abdi İpekçi Spor Salonu; Istanbul
Preceded by Pabellón Príncipe Felipe; Zaragoza	Saporta Cup; Final Venue; 2000	Succeeded by Hala Torwar; Warsaw
