= 2004 Uber Cup group stage =

Badminton team tournament in Jakarta

The 2004 Uber Cup group stage was held at Istora Gelora Bung Karno in Jakarta, Indonesia, from 7 to 10 May 2004.

The group stage was first stage of the tournament where the group winner advanced to the quarter-finals while the remaining teams advanced to the round of 16 in the knockout stages.

== Draw ==
The original draw for the tournament was conducted on 13 March 2004. The 12 teams will be drawn into four groups each containing three teams.

=== Group composition ===
Group
Group W	Group X	Group Y	Group Z
China; Indonesia (Host); Netherlands	Germany; South Africa; Chinese Taipei	Denmark; Japan; Malaysia	Australia; Canada; South Korea

== Group W ==
Pos	Team	Pld	W	L	MF	MA	MD	GF	GA	GD	PF	PA	PD	Pts	Qualification
1	China	2	2	0	10	0	+10	20	2	+18	267	86	+181	2	Quarter-finals
2	Netherlands	2	1	1	3	7	−4	7	16	−9	167	267	−100	1	Round of 16
3	Indonesia (H)	2	0	2	2	8	−6	7	16	−9	166	247	−81	0	Round of 16

Source: BadmintonCN
(H) Host

=== China vs Indonesia ===
China
5
Istora Gelora Bung Karno
7 May 2004, 14:30 UTC+7

Indonesia
0

			1	2	3
1	(China) (Indonesia)	Gong Ruina; Silvi Antarini	11; 1	3; 11	11; 3
2	(China) (Indonesia)	Yang Wei / Zhang Jiewen; Liliyana Natsir / Jo Novita	15; 5	15; 2
3	(China) (Indonesia)	Zhou Mi; Maria Kristin Yulianti	11; 1	11; 1
4	(China) (Indonesia)	Wei Yili / Zhao Tingting; Lita Nurlita / Greysia Polii	15; 2	15; 4
5	(China) (Indonesia)	Xie Xingfang; Adriyanti Firdasari	11; 1	11; 6

=== Netherlands vs Indonesia ===
Netherlands
3
Istora Gelora Bung Karno
9 May 2004, 14:30 UTC+7

Indonesia
2

			1	2	3
1	(Netherlands) (Indonesia)	Yao Jie; Silvi Antarini	11; 9	6; 11	11; 8
2	(Netherlands) (Indonesia)	Karina de Wit; Maria Kristin Yulianti	11; 9	11; 9
3	(Netherlands) (Indonesia)	Judith Meulendijks; Adriyanti Firdasari	7; 11	11; 2	11; 8
4	(Netherlands) (Indonesia)	Brenda Beenhakker / Karina de Wit; Liliyana Natsir / Greysia Polii	5; 15	7; 15
5	(Netherlands) (Indonesia)	Eva Krab / Judith Meulendijks; Jo Novita / Lita Nurlita	14; 17	13; 15

=== China vs Netherlands ===
China
5
Istora Gelora Bung Karno
10 May 2004, 14:30 UTC+7

Netherlands
0

			1	2	3
1	(China) (Netherlands)	Gong Ruina; Karina de Wit	13; 11	11; 5
2	(China) (Netherlands)	Zhou Mi; Judith Meulendijks	11; 5	10; 13	11; 5
3	(China) (Netherlands)	Xie Xingfang; Brenda Beenhakker	11; 2	11; 2
4	(China) (Netherlands)	Huang Sui / Yang Wei; Eva Krab / Paulien van Dooremalen	15; 0	15; 2
5	(China) (Netherlands)	Wei Yili / Zhao Tingting; Brenda Beenhakker / Karina de Wit	15; 1	15; 3

== Group X ==
Pos	Team	Pld	W	L	MF	MA	MD	GF	GA	GD	PF	PA	PD	Pts	Qualification
1	Chinese Taipei	2	2	0	9	1	+8	18	3	+15	243	86	+157	2	Quarter-finals
2	Germany	2	1	1	5	5	0	11	8	+3	167	143	+24	1	Round of 16
3	South Africa	2	0	2	1	9	−8	0	18	−18	41	222	−181	0	Round of 16

Source: BadmintonCN.com

=== Chinese Taipei vs South Africa ===
Chinese Taipei
5
Istora Gelora Bung Karno
7 May 2004, 19:00 UTC+7

South Africa
0

			1	2	3
1	(Chinese Taipei) (South Africa)	Cheng Shao-chieh; Michelle Edwards	11; 0	11; 1
2	(Chinese Taipei) (South Africa)	Chang Yun-ju / Yang Chia-chen; Marika Daubern / Candace Holmes	15; 1	15; 4
3	(Chinese Taipei) (South Africa)	Huang Chia-chi; Chantal Botts	11; 1	11; 2
4	(Chinese Taipei) (South Africa)	Cheng Wen-hsing / Chien Yu-chin; Chantal Botts / Michelle Edwards	15; 3	15; 3
5	(Chinese Taipei) (South Africa)	Huang Chia-hsin; Annari Viljoen	11; 0	11; 0

=== Germany vs South Africa ===
Germany
4
Istora Gelora Bung Karno
9 May 2004, 14:30 UTC+7

South Africa
1

			1	2	3
1	(Germany) (South Africa)	Huaiwen Xu; Michelle Edwards	11; 1	11; 3
2	(Germany) (South Africa)	Juliane Schenk; Chantal Botts	11; 8	11; 1
3	(Germany) (South Africa)	Nicole Grether; Marika Daubern	11; 0	11; 3
4	(Germany) (South Africa)	Carina Mette / Kathrin Piotrowski; Candace Holmes / Annari Viljoen	15; 6	15; 4
5	(Germany) (South Africa)	Nicole Grether / Juliane Schenk; Chantal Botts / Michelle Edwards				w/o

=== Chinese Taipei vs Germany ===
Chinese Taipei
4
Istora Gelora Bung Karno
10 May 2004, 14:30 UTC+7

Germany
1

			1	2	3
1	(Chinese Taipei) (Germany)	Cheng Shao-chieh; Huaiwen Xu	4; 11	7; 11
2	(Chinese Taipei) (Germany)	Huang Chia-chi; Juliane Schenk	11; 6	11; 1
3	(Chinese Taipei) (Germany)	Huang Chia-hsin; Nicole Grether	2; 11	11; 3	11; 7
4	(Chinese Taipei) (Germany)	Chang Yun-ju / Yang Chia-chen; Kathrin Piotrowski / Juliane Schenk	15; 6	15; 4
5	(Chinese Taipei) (Germany)	Cheng Wen-hsing / Chien Yu-chin; Nicole Grether / Carina Mette	15; 6	15; 5

== Group Y ==
Pos	Team	Pld	W	L	MF	MA	MD	GF	GA	GD	PF	PA	PD	Pts	Qualification
1	Denmark	2	2	0	8	2	+6	17	7	+10	260	197	+63	2	Quarter-finals
2	Japan	2	1	1	6	4	+2	14	10	+4	259	220	+39	1	Round of 16
3	Malaysia	2	0	2	1	9	−8	5	19	−14	189	291	−102	0	Round of 16

Source: BadmintonCN.com

=== Japan vs Malaysia ===
Japan
4
Istora Gelora Bung Karno
7 May 2004, 14:30 UTC+7

Malaysia
1

			1	2	3
1	(Japan) (Malaysia)	Kanako Yonekura; Wong Mew Choo	9; 11	13; 11	11; 5
2	(Japan) (Malaysia)	Chikako Nakayama / Keiko Yoshitomi; Chin Eei Hui / Wong Pei Tty	15; 13	9; 15	11; 15
3	(Japan) (Malaysia)	Kaori Mori; Woon Sze Mei	11; 1	13; 11
4	(Japan) (Malaysia)	Seiko Yamada / Shizuka Yamamoto; Fong Chew Yen / Ooi Sock Ai	15; 10	15; 4
5	(Japan) (Malaysia)	Miho Tanaka; Norshahliza Baharum	11; 7	11; 4

=== Denmark vs Malaysia ===
Denmark
5
Istora Gelora Bung Karno
8 May 2004, 14:30 UTC+7

Malaysia
0

			1	2	3
1	(Denmark) (Malaysia)	Camilla Martin; Wong Mew Choo	11; 3	11; 6
2	(Denmark) (Malaysia)	Ann-Lou Jørgensen / Rikke Olsen; Chin Eei Hui / Wong Pei Tty	12; 15	15; 7	15; 8
3	(Denmark) (Malaysia)	Tine Rasmussen; Woon Sze Mei	7; 11	11; 6	11; 9
4	(Denmark) (Malaysia)	Pernille Harder / Mette Schjoldager; Mooi Hing Yau / Ooi Sock Ai	15; 2	15; 2
5	(Denmark) (Malaysia)	Camilla Sørensen; Sugita Kunalan	11; 3	13; 10

=== Japan vs Denmark ===
Japan
2
Istora Gelora Bung Karno
9 May 2004, 19:00 UTC+7

Denmark
3

			1	2	3
1	(Japan) (Denmark)	Kanako Yonekura; Camilla Martin	7; 11	11; 5	4; 11
2	(Japan) (Denmark)	Seiko Yamada / Shizuka Yamamoto; Ann-Lou Jørgensen / Rikke Olsen	11; 15	11; 15
3	(Japan) (Denmark)	Kaori Mori; Tine Rasmussen	5; 11	4; 11
4	(Japan) (Denmark)	Chikako Nakayama / Kumiko Ogura; Kamilla Rytter Juhl / Helle Nielsen	15; 9	10; 15	15; 9
5	(Japan) (Denmark)	Miho Tanaka; Amalie Ørsted	11; 1	11; 0

== Group Z ==
Pos	Team	Pld	W	L	MF	MA	MD	GF	GA	GD	PF	PA	PD	Pts	Qualification
1	South Korea	2	2	0	10	0	+10	20	0	+20	252	64	+188	2	Quarter-finals
2	Australia	2	1	1	5	5	0	10	12	−2	190	211	−21	1	Round of 16
3	Canada	2	0	2	0	10	−10	2	20	−18	105	272	−167	0	Round of 16

Source: BadmintonCN.com

=== South Korea vs Canada ===
South Korea
5
Istora Gelora Bung Karno
7 May 2004, 19:00 UTC+7

Canada
0

			1	2	3
1	(South Korea) (Canada)	Jun Jae-youn; Charmaine Reid	11; 0	11; 2
2	(South Korea) (Canada)	Hwang Yu-mi / Lee Hyo-jung; Helen Nichol / Charmaine Reid	15; 5	15; 3
3	(South Korea) (Canada)	Seo Yoon-hee; Sarah MacMaster	11; 1	11; 4
4	(South Korea) (Canada)	Lee Yun-hwa / Lee Kyung-won; Sarah MacMaster / Valérie St. Jacques	15; 3	15; 0
5	(South Korea) (Canada)	Ha Jung-eun; Kelli Sherlock	11; 1	11; 1

=== Australia vs Canada ===
Australia
5
Istora Gelora Bung Karno
8 May 2004, 19:00 UTC+7

Canada
0

			1	2	3
1	(Australia) (Canada)	Lenny Permana; Charmaine Reid	11; 4	11; 7
2	(Australia) (Canada)	Kellie Lucas; Sarah MacMaster	11; 7	11; 3
3	(Australia) (Canada)	Jane Crabtree; Valérie St. Jacques	5; 11	13; 11	11; 3
4	(Australia) (Canada)	Kellie Lucas / Lenny Permana; Sarah MacMaster / Kelli Sherlock	15; 2	15; 7
5	(Australia) (Canada)	Jane Crabtree / Kate Wilson-Smith; Helen Nichol / Charmaine Reid	13; 15	15; 7	15; 8

=== South Korea vs Australia ===
South Korea
5
Istora Gelora Bung Karno
10 May 2004, 14:30 UTC+7

Australia
0

			1	2	3
1	(South Korea) (Australia)	Jun Jae-youn; Lenny Permana	11; 7	11; 0
2	(South Korea) (Australia)	Seo Yoon-hee; Kellie Lucas	11; 2	11; 6
3	(South Korea) (Australia)	Lee Yun-hwa; Tania Luiz	11; 1	11; 3
4	(South Korea) (Australia)	Hwang Yu-mi / Lee Hyo-jung; Jane Crabtree / Kate Wilson-Smith	15; 0	15; 4
5	(South Korea) (Australia)	Kim Mi-young / Lee Kyung-won; Kellie Lucas / Tania Luiz	15; 8	15; 13
