= 2004 Uber Cup knockout stage =

2004 Knockout stage of the Thomas Cup badminton team championship

The knockout stage for the 2004 Uber Cup in Jakarta began on 11 May 2004 with the round of 16 and ended on 15 May 2004 with the final.

== Group results ==
The winners of each group were exempted until the quarter-finals stage while the rest of the teams competed in the round of 16 for a place in the final eight.

Group	Winners	Runners-up	Third place
A	China	Netherlands	Indonesia
B	Chinese Taipei	Germany	South Africa
C	Denmark	Japan	Malaysia
D	South Korea	Australia	Canada

== Bracket ==
Round of 16
China
Bye
Malaysia	3
Australia	0
Chinese Taipei
Bye
Japan	3
Canada	0
Denmark
Bye
Netherlands	3
South Africa	0
South Korea
Bye
Indonesia	3
Germany	0

Quarter-finals
China	3
Malaysia	0
Chinese Taipei	2
Japan	3
Denmark	3
Netherlands	2
South Korea	3
Indonesia	1

Semi-finals
China	3
South Korea	0
Indonesia	2
Denmark	3

Final
China	3
Denmark	1

== Round of 16 ==
=== Germany vs Indonesia ===
The host team were drawn to face sixth seeds Germany in the round of 16 after finishing third in their group. The hosts won the tie 3–0 and advanced to the quarter-finals stage.

Germany
0
Istora Gelora Bung Karno
11 May 2004, 14:30 UTC+7

Indonesia
3

			1	2	3
1	(Germany) (Indonesia)	Xu Huaiwen; Silvi Antarini	6; 11	10; 13
2	(Germany) (Indonesia)	Juliane Schenk; Maria Kristin Yulianti	11; 8	1; 11	4; 11
3	(Germany) (Indonesia)	Nicole Grether; Adriyanti Firdasari	7; 11	8; 11
4	(Germany) (Indonesia)	Carina Mette / Kathrin Piotrowski; Liliyana Natsir / Greysia Polii				not played
5	(Germany) (Indonesia)	Nicole Grether / Juliane Schenk; Jo Novita / Lita Nurlita				not played

=== Netherlands vs South Africa ===
The Netherlands, who finished as runners-up of Group A were up against South Africa who finished third in Group B. The Dutch team took only an hour and thirty minutes to finish off their opponents 3–0 and qualify for the quarter-finals.

Netherlands
3
Istora Gelora Bung Karno
11 May 2004, 14:30 UTC+7

South Africa
0

			1	2	3
1	(Netherlands) (South Africa)	Karina de Wit; Michelle Edwards	11; 4	11; 3
2	(Netherlands) (South Africa)	Judith Meulendijks; Chantal Botts	11; 0	11; 0
3	(Netherlands) (South Africa)	Brenda Beenhakker; Annari Viljoen	11; 3	11; 0
4	(Netherlands) (South Africa)	Lotte Jonathans / Judith Meulendijks; Chantal Botts / Michelle Edwards				not played
5	(Netherlands) (South Africa)	Brenda Beenhakker / Karina de Wit; Marika Daubern / Candace Holmes				not played

=== Australia vs Malaysia ===
Eighth seeds Australia who finished second in Group D faced Malaysia who finished third in Group C. The last time the teams met was in the 1998 Commonwealth Games women's team event, where the Malaysians defeated the Australians 5–0 on home soil in the round-robin event. Malaysia advanced to the quarter-finals after defeating Australia 3–0.

Australia
0
Istora Gelora Bung Karno
11 May 2004, 19:30 UTC+7

Malaysia
3

			1	2	3
1	(Australia) (Malaysia)	Lenny Permana; Wong Mew Choo	5; 11	8; 11
2	(Australia) (Malaysia)	Jane Crabtree / Kate Wilson-Smith; Chin Eei Hui / Wong Pei Tty	12; 15	2; 15
3	(Australia) (Malaysia)	Kellie Lucas; Woon Sze Mei	10; 13	10; 13
4	(Australia) (Malaysia)	Kellie Lucas / Tania Luiz; Mooi Hing Yau / Ooi Sock Ai				not played
5	(Australia) (Malaysia)	Jane Crabtree; Norshahliza Baharum				not played

=== Japan vs Canada ===
The last time the two teams met in the Uber Cup was in 1981, when Japan beat Canada 9–0 in the inter-zone rounds. The Japanese team qualified for the quarter-finals after defeating Canada 3–0, winning all their matches in two straight games.

Japan
3
Istora Gelora Bung Karno
11 May 2004, 19:30 UTC+7

Canada
0

			1	2	3
1	(Japan) (Canada)	Kanako Yonekura; Charmaine Reid	11; 8	11; 8
2	(Japan) (Canada)	Chikako Nakayama / Keiko Yoshitomi; Helen Nichol / Charmaine Reid	15; 2	15; 4
3	(Japan) (Canada)	Miho Tanaka; Valérie St. Jacques	11; 1	11; 0
4	(Japan) (Canada)	Seiko Yamada / Shizuka Yamamoto; Sarah MacMaster / Valérie St. Jacques				not played
5	(Japan) (Canada)	Yu Hirayama; Kelli Sherlock				not played

== Quarter-finals ==
=== China vs Malaysia ===
The two teams last met in the Uber Cup in 1992, where the Chinese team won 5–0 against the Malaysians in the group stage.

China started the tie with a 1–0 lead over Malaysia when Zhang Ning defeated Wong Mew Choo 11–4, 11–5. The Chinese extended their lead when Gao Ling and Huang Sui defeated Chin Eei Hui and Wong Pei Tty in two straight games. Zhou Mi earned the winning point for China after defeating Norshahliza Baharum in the third singles match 11–0, 11–3.

China
3
Istora Gelora Bung Karno
12 May 2004, 14:30 UTC+7

Malaysia
0

			1	2	3
1	(China) (Malaysia)	Zhang Ning; Wong Mew Choo	11; 4	11; 5
2	(China) (Malaysia)	Gao Ling / Huang Sui; Chin Eei Hui / Wong Pei Tty	15; 8	15; 5
3	(China) (Malaysia)	Zhou Mi; Norshahliza Baharum	11; 0	11; 3
4	(China) (Malaysia)	Wei Yili / Zhao Tingting; Mooi Hing Yau / Ooi Sock Ai				not played
5	(China) (Malaysia)	Xie Xingfang; Anita Raj Kaur				not played

=== Chinese Taipei vs Japan ===
The teams recently played against each other at the semi-finals of the Asian Uber Cup Preliminaries, where Japan suffered an upset defeat against Chinese Taipei 0–3.

Japan gained a 1–0 lead when Kanako Yonekura beat Cheng Shao-chieh 11–5, 11–9. Chinese Taipei levelled the score 1–1 when Cheng Wen-hsing and Chien Yu-chin defeated Chikako Nakayama and Keiko Yoshitomi in the first doubles match. Chinese Taipei extended their lead to 2–1 with Huang Chia-chi winning the second singles match against Kaori Mori. Japan later equalized 2–2 after winning the second doubles match. In the crucial third singles match, Miho Tanaka won the winning point for Japan after beating Huang Chia-hsin 11–5, 11–0.

Chinese Taipei
2
Istora Gelora Bung Karno
12 May 2004, 14:30 UTC+7

Japan
3

			1	2	3
1	(Chinese Taipei) (Japan)	Cheng Shao-chieh; Kanako Yonekura	5; 11	9; 11
2	(Chinese Taipei) (Japan)	Cheng Wen-hsing / Chien Yu-chin; Chikako Nakayama / Keiko Yoshitomi	15; 10	15; 8
3	(Chinese Taipei) (Japan)	Huang Chia-chi; Kaori Mori	11; 4	8; 11	11; 5
4	(Chinese Taipei) (Japan)	Chang Yun-ju / Yang Chia-chen; Kumiko Ogura / Shizuka Yamamoto	10; 15	10; 15
5	(Chinese Taipei) (Japan)	Huang Chia-hsin; Miho Tanaka	5; 11	0; 11

=== Denmark vs Netherlands ===
Denmark and the Netherlands competed in an all-European derby for a place in the semi-finals. The last time the two teams met in the Uber Cup was in 1988, where the Danes won 3–2 in the group stage.

Olympic silver medalist Camilla Martin suffered a shocking defeat in the first game against Yao Jie 11–8. Martin then came back in the second game to win against her opponent by the same margin. The Dutch player won the deciding game against the Dane 11–8 to earn the Netherlands' first point in the tie. The second singles match went Denmark's way when Tine Rasmussen beat Karina de Wit in three games to help Denmark earn their first point in the tie. The Netherlands regained their lead after Judith Meulendijks beat Camilla Sørensen in two straight games. Denmark then came back to win the tie 3–2 after beating the Dutch in the next two doubles matches.

Denmark
3
Istora Gelora Bung Karno
12 May 2004, 14:30 UTC+7

Netherlands
2

			1	2	3
1	(Denmark) (Netherlands)	Camilla Martin; Yao Jie	8; 11	11; 8	8; 11
2	(Denmark) (Netherlands)	Tine Rasmussen; Karina de Wit	11; 7	5; 11	11; 4
3	(Denmark) (Netherlands)	Camilla Sørensen; Judith Meulendijks	3; 11	8; 11
4	(Denmark) (Netherlands)	Ann-Lou Jørgensen / Rikke Olsen; Karina de Wit / Lotte Jonathans	15; 6	12; 15	15; 2
5	(Denmark) (Netherlands)	Pernille Harder / Mette Schjoldager; Judith Meulendijks / Yao Jie	15; 5	15; 10

=== South Korea vs Indonesia ===
The last meeting between South Korea and Indonesia at the Uber Cup was in 1996, where Indonesia defeated South Korea 4–1 in the semi-finals.

Jun Jae-youn earned South Korea's first point in the tie by defeating Silvi Antarini 11–4, 11–1. The South Koreans doubled their lead when Seo Yoon-hee defeated Maria Kristin Yulianti 11–5, 11–9. In the third singles match, South Korea's Lee Yun-hwa won the first game against Adriyanti Firdasari 11–9. Firdasari then fought back and gave the host team hope after winning the next two games 11–6, 11–7 to win Indonesia's first point in the tie. In the second doubles match, the Indonesian pair of Jo Novita and Lita Nurlita lead the first game but could not convert and lost 14–17 to the South Koreans. Despite managing to fight back in the second set 15–1, the pair lost 12–15 in the third game and were eliminated in the quarter-finals.

South Korea
3
Istora Gelora Bung Karno
12 May 2004, 14:30 UTC+7

Indonesia
1

			1	2	3
1	(South Korea) (Indonesia)	Jun Jae-youn; Silvi Antarini	11; 4	11; 1
2	(South Korea) (Indonesia)	Seo Yoon-hee; Maria Kristin Yulianti	11; 5	11; 9
3	(South Korea) (Indonesia)	Lee Yun-hwa; Adriyanti Firdasari	11; 9	6; 11	7; 11
4	(South Korea) (Indonesia)	Hwang Yu-mi / Lee Hyo-jung; Jo Novita / Lita Nurlita	17; 14	1; 15	15; 12
5	(South Korea) (Indonesia)	Lee Kyung-won / Lee Yun-hwa; Liliyana Natsir / Greysia Polii				not played

== Semi-finals ==
=== China vs Japan ===
The teams last met in the 2002 Uber Cup group stage with China beating Japan 5–0.

The first point went to China when Gong Ruina defeated Kanako Yonekura 11–5, 11–2. China extended their lead when Gao Ling and Huang Sui defeated Seiko Yamada and Shizuka Yamamoto 15–3, 15–2. Japan were officially eliminated in the semi-finals after Zhang Ning defeated Kaori Mori 11–7 in both games.

China
3
Istora Gelora Bung Karno
13 May 2004, 14:30 UTC+7

Japan
0

			1	2	3
1	(China) (Japan)	Gong Ruina; Kanako Yonekura	11; 5	11; 2
2	(China) (Japan)	Gao Ling / Huang Sui; Seiko Yamada / Shizuka Yamamoto	15; 3	15; 2
3	(China) (Japan)	Zhang Ning; Kaori Mori	11; 7	11; 7
4	(China) (Japan)	Wei Yili / Zhao Tingting; Keiko Yoshitomi / Kumiko Ogura				not played
5	(China) (Japan)	Zhou Mi; Miho Tanaka				not played

=== South Korea vs Denmark ===
The last time South Korea faced Denmark in the Uber Cup semi-finals was in 2000, with Denmark winning 3–0.

Camilla Martin won the first point for Denmark when she defeated Jun Jae-youn in the first singles match. The team won the second point after Tine Rasmussen beat Seo Yoon-hee in three games. South Korea won the third singles match when Lee Yun-hwa defeated Camilla Sørensen 11–1, 11–7. The South Koreans levelled the score 2–2 after Hwang Yu-mi and Lee Hyo-jung defeated Ann-Lou Jørgensen and Rikke Olsen in three thrilling games.

In the final match of the tie, the South Korean pair of Lee Kyung-won and Lee Yun-hwa beat Pernille Harder and Mette Schjoldager in three games to book South Korea a place in the 2004 Uber Cup final.

South Korea
3
Istora Gelora Bung Karno
13 May 2004, 19:00 UTC+7

Denmark
2

			1	2	3
1	(South Korea) (Denmark)	Jun Jae-youn; Camilla Martin	6; 11	6; 11
2	(South Korea) (Denmark)	Seo Yoon-hee; Tine Rasmussen	11; 9	5; 11	6; 11
3	(South Korea) (Denmark)	Lee Yun-hwa; Camilla Sørensen	11; 1	11; 7
4	(South Korea) (Denmark)	Hwang Yu-mi / Lee Hyo-jung; Ann-Lou Jørgensen / Rikke Olsen	15; 10	6; 15	17; 15
5	(South Korea) (Denmark)	Lee Kyung-won / Lee Yun-hwa; Pernille Harder / Mette Schjoldager	15; 13	5; 15	15; 10

== Final ==
=== China vs South Korea ===
The final of the 2004 Uber Cup was played on 15 May 2004. In the last Uber Cup final, the Chinese team defeated the South Koreans 3–0.

In the first singles match, world number 1 Gong Ruina lost the first game to Jun Jae-youn 7–11. The Chinese player then trailed 0–5 in the second game against her opponent. Gong then came back from the 5-point deficit to win the second game 11–5. In the deciding game, Gong won 11–7 to give China their first point. The South Koreans levelled the tie 1–1 by winning the first doubles match 15–7, 15–10.

In the second singles match, Zhang Ning won the first game against Seo Yoon-hee 11–1. In the second set, the South Korean levelled the score at 10-10 but lost 10–13 to give China their second point. China successfully retained their Uber Cup title after their victory in the second doubles match and earning the winning point in the tie.

China
3
Istora Gelora Bung Karno
15 May 2004, 19:00 UTC+7

South Korea
1

			1	2	3
1	(China) (South Korea)	Gong Ruina; Jun Jae-youn	7; 11	11; 5	11; 7
2	(China) (South Korea)	Yang Wei / Zhang Jiewen; Hwang Yu-mi / Lee Hyo-jung	7; 15	10; 15
3	(China) (South Korea)	Zhang Ning; Seo Yoon-hee	11; 1	13; 10
4	(China) (South Korea)	Gao Ling / Huang Sui; Lee Kyung-won / Lee Yun-hwa	15; 6	15; 2
5	(China) (South Korea)	Zhou Mi; Ha Jung-eun				not played
