= 1996 Thomas Cup group stage =

Badminton team Tournament in Hong Kong

The 1996 Thomas Cup group stage was held at Queen Elizabeth Stadium in Hong Kong from 17 to 21 May 1996.

The group stage was first stage of the tournament where only the two highest-placing teams in each of the two groups advanced to the knockout stage.

== Draw ==
The 8 teams were drawn into two groups each containing four teams.

=== Group composition ===
Group
Group A	Group B
China; England; Indonesia; Sweden	Denmark; Hong Kong (Host); South Korea; Malaysia

== Group A ==
Pos	Team	Pld	W	L	GF	GA	GD	PF	PA	PD	Pts	Qualification
1	Indonesia	3	3	0	28	8	+20	504	303	+201	3	Advance to semi-finals
2	China	3	2	1	25	11	+14	483	352	+131	2	Advance to semi-finals
3	Sweden	3	1	2	13	24	−11	363	488	−125	1	
4	England	3	0	3	6	29	−23	298	505	−207	0	

Source: The Straits Times

=== Indonesia vs China ===
Indonesia
3
Queen Elizabeth Stadium
17 May 1996, 12:00 UTC+8

China
2

			1	2	3
1	(Indonesia) (China)	Joko Suprianto; Dong Jiong	15; 10	7; 15	8; 15
2	(Indonesia) (China)	Rexy Mainaky / Ricky Subagja; Huang Zhanzhong / Jiang Xin	15; 6	15; 5
3	(Indonesia) (China)	Hariyanto Arbi; Sun Jun	15; 8	7; 15	5; 15
4	(Indonesia) (China)	Antonius Ariantho / Denny Kantono; Liu Jianjun / Liu Yong	15; 7	15; 11
5	(Indonesia) (China)	Alan Budikusuma; Lin Liwen	14; 17	15; 3	18; 15

=== Sweden vs England ===
Sweden
4
Queen Elizabeth Stadium
17 May 1996, 12:00 UTC+8

England
1

			1	2	3
1	(Sweden) (England)	Jens Olsson; Darren Hall	15; 10	15; 9
2	(Sweden) (England)	Peter Axelsson / Pär-Gunnar Jönsson; Julian Robertson / Nathan Robertson	13; 15	15; 8	15; 6
3	(Sweden) (England)	Rickard Magnusson; Peter Knowles	15; 5	15; 4
4	(Sweden) (England)	Henrik Andersson / Johan Tholinsson; James Anderson / Chris Hunt	15; 8	12; 15	5; 15
5	(Sweden) (England)	Jesper Olsson; Peter Bush	17; 15	10; 15	15; 10

=== Indonesia vs Sweden ===
Indonesia
5
Queen Elizabeth Stadium
19 May 1996, 12:00 UTC+8

Sweden
0

			1	2	3
1	(Indonesia) (Sweden)	Joko Suprianto; Jens Olsson	16; 17	15; 3	15; 7
2	(Indonesia) (Sweden)	Rexy Mainaky / Ricky Subagja; Peter Axelsson / Pär-Gunnar Jönsson	15; 7	15; 3
3	(Indonesia) (Sweden)	Alan Budikusuma; Tomas Johansson	12; 15	15; 5	15; 2
4	(Indonesia) (Sweden)	Rudy Gunawan / Bambang Suprianto; Henrik Andersson / Johan Tholinsson	15; 4	15; 3
5	(Indonesia) (Sweden)	Ardy Wiranata; Rickard Magnusson	15; 5	15; 12

=== China vs England ===
China
5
Queen Elizabeth Stadium
19 May 1996, 18:30 UTC+8

England
0

			1	2	3
1	(China) (England)	Dong Jiong; Darren Hall	15; 5	15; 6
2	(China) (England)	Ge Cheng / Tao Xiaoqiang; Julian Robertson / Nathan Robertson	15; 6	15; 2
3	(China) (England)	Lin Liwen; Peter Knowles	15; 11	15; 8
4	(China) (England)	Huang Zhanzhong / Liu Yong; James Anderson / Chris Hunt	16; 17	15; 4	15; 8
5	(China) (England)	Chen Gang; Colin Haughton	15; 11	15; 7

=== Indonesia vs England ===
Indonesia
5
Queen Elizabeth Stadium
21 May 1996, 12:00 UTC+8

England
0

			1	2	3
1	(Indonesia) (England)	Hariyanto Arbi; Darren Hall	15; 8	15; 2
2	(Indonesia) (England)	Rexy Mainaky / Ricky Subagja; Julian Robertson / Nathan Robertson	15; 6	15; 6
3	(Indonesia) (England)	Alan Budikusuma; Peter Bush	15; 12	15; 5
4	(Indonesia) (England)	Antonius Ariantho / Denny Kantono; James Anderson / Chris Hunt	15; 5	15; 10
5	(Indonesia) (England)	Ardy Wiranata; Colin Haughton	12; 15	15; 3	15; 6

=== China vs Sweden ===
China
5
Queen Elizabeth Stadium
21 May 1996, 12:00 UTC+8

Sweden
0

			1	2	3
1	(China) (Sweden)	Dong Jiong; Jens Olsson	15; 4	14; 17	15; 9
2	(China) (Sweden)	Huang Zhanzhong / Jiang Xin; Peter Axelsson / Pär-Gunnar Jönsson	15; 8	11; 15	15; 7
3	(China) (Sweden)	Sun Jun; Tomas Johansson	15; 9	15; 9
4	(China) (Sweden)	Ge Cheng / Tao Xiaoqiang; Henrik Andersson / Johan Tholinsson	15; 11	15; 3
5	(China) (Sweden)	Lin Liwen; Rickard Magnusson	15; 2	15; 9

== Group B ==
Pos	Team	Pld	W	L	GF	GA	GD	PF	PA	PD	Pts	Qualification
1	Denmark	3	3	0	25	11	+14	481	364	+117	3	Advance to semi-finals
2	South Korea	3	2	1	23	10	+13	433	335	+98	2	Advance to semi-finals
3	Malaysia	3	1	2	18	17	+1	437	376	+61	1	
4	Hong Kong (H)	3	0	3	2	30	−28	198	474	−276	0	

Source: The Straits Times
(H) Host

=== Malaysia vs South Korea ===
Malaysia
2
Queen Elizabeth Stadium
17 May 1996, 18:30 UTC+8

South Korea
3

			1	2	3
1	(Malaysia) (South Korea)	Rashid Sidek; Park Sung-woo	10; 15	9; 15
2	(Malaysia) (South Korea)	Cheah Soon Kit / Yap Kim Hock; Kim Dong-moon / Park Joo-bong	11; 15	9; 15
3	(Malaysia) (South Korea)	Ong Ewe Hock; Lee Gwang-jin	12; 15	15; 7	17; 15
4	(Malaysia) (South Korea)	Soo Beng Kiang / Tan Kim Her; Ha Tae-kwon / Yoo Yong-sung	15; 7	11; 15	15; 9
5	(Malaysia) (South Korea)	Pang Chen; Ahn Jae-chang	9; 15	5; 15

=== Denmark vs Hong Kong ===
Denmark
5
Queen Elizabeth Stadium
17 May 1996, 18:30 UTC+8

Hong Kong
0

			1	2	3
1	(Denmark) (Hong Kong)	Poul-Erik Høyer Larsen; Tam Kai Chuen	14; 18	15; 9	15; 6
2	(Denmark) (Hong Kong)	Michael Søgaard / Henrik Svarrer; Chan Siu Kwong / Tim He	15; 4	15; 7
3	(Denmark) (Hong Kong)	Thomas Stuer-Lauridsen; Tam Lok Tin	15; 6	15; 4
4	(Denmark) (Hong Kong)	Jon Holst-Christensen / Thomas Stavngaard; Chow Kin Man / Ma Che Kong	15; 5	15; 10
5	(Denmark) (Hong Kong)	Peter Rasmussen; Liu Kwok Wa	15; 5	10; 15	15; 1

=== South Korea vs Denmark ===
South Korea
2
Queen Elizabeth Stadium
19 May 1996, 12:00 UTC+8

Denmark
3

			1	2	3
1	(South Korea) (Denmark)	Park Sung-woo; Poul-Erik Høyer Larsen	8; 15	5; 15
2	(South Korea) (Denmark)	Ha Tae-kwon / Kang Kyung-jin; Jon Holst-Christensen / Jim Laugesen	15; 10	15; 5
3	(South Korea) (Denmark)	Lee Gwang-jin; Thomas Stuer-Lauridsen	15; 11	11; 15	2; 15
4	(South Korea) (Denmark)	Kim Dong-moon / Park Joo-bong; Michael Søgaard / Henrik Svarrer	15; 9	15; 11
5	(South Korea) (Denmark)	Ahn Jae-chang; Peter Rasmussen	9; 15	15; 18

=== Malaysia vs Hong Kong ===
Malaysia
5
Queen Elizabeth Stadium
19 May 1996, 18:30 UTC+8

Hong Kong
0

			1	2	3
1	(Malaysia) (Hong Kong)	Rashid Sidek; Tam Kai Chuen	15; 4	15; 2
2	(Malaysia) (Hong Kong)	Cheah Soon Kit / Yap Kim Hock; Chan Siu Kwong / Tim He	15; 5	15; 4
3	(Malaysia) (Hong Kong)	Ong Ewe Hock; Tam Lok Tin	15; 6	15; 6
4	(Malaysia) (Hong Kong)	Soo Beng Kiang / Tan Kim Her; Chow Kin Man / Ma Che Kong	15; 7	15; 5
5	(Malaysia) (Hong Kong)	Pang Chen; Liu Kwok Wa	15; 4	15; 7

=== Malaysia vs Denmark ===
Malaysia
1
Queen Elizabeth Stadium
21 May 1996, 18:30 UTC+8

Denmark
4

			1	2	3
1	(Malaysia) (Denmark)	Rashid Sidek; Poul-Erik Høyer Larsen	18; 16	13; 15	6; 15
2	(Malaysia) (Denmark)	Cheah Soon Kit / Yap Kim Hock; Jon Holst-Christensen / Jim Laugesen	15; 0	12; 15	15; 7
3	(Malaysia) (Denmark)	Ong Ewe Hock; Thomas Stuer-Lauridsen	12; 15	6; 15
4	(Malaysia) (Denmark)	Soo Beng Kiang / Tan Kim Her; Michael Søgaard / Henrik Svarrer	13; 18	15; 7	1; 15
5	(Malaysia) (Denmark)	Pang Chen; Peter Rasmussen	12; 15	11; 15

=== South Korea vs Hong Kong ===
South Korea
5
Queen Elizabeth Stadium
21 May 1996, 18:30 UTC+8

Hong Kong
0

			1	2	3
1	(South Korea) (Hong Kong)	Park Sung-woo; Tam Kai Chuen	15; 11	15; 8
2	(South Korea) (Hong Kong)	Kim Dong-moon / Park Joo-bong; Chan Siu Kwong / Tim He	15; 7	15; 4
3	(South Korea) (Hong Kong)	Lee Gwang-jin; Ng Wei	15; 7	15; 1
4	(South Korea) (Hong Kong)	Ha Tae-kwon / Yoo Yong-sung; Chow Kin Man / Ma Che Kong	15; 5	15; 3
5	(South Korea) (Hong Kong)	Ahn Jae-chang; Liu Kwok Wa	15; 7	15; 5
