= 1996 Thomas Cup knockout stage =

1996 Knockout stage of the Thomas Cup badminton team championship

The knockout stage for the 1996 Thomas Cup in Hong Kong began on 24 May 1996 with the semi-finals and ended on 26 May 1996 with the final.

== Qualified teams ==
The top two placed teams from each of the two groups qualified for this stage.

Group	Winners	Runners-up
A	Indonesia	China
B	Denmark	South Korea

== Bracket ==
Semi-finals
Indonesia	3
South Korea	2
China	2
Denmark	3

Final
Indonesia	5
Denmark	0

== Semi-finals ==
=== Semi-final 1 ===
China
2
Queen Elizabeth Stadium
24 May 1996, 12:00 UTC+8

Denmark
3

			1	2	3
1	(China) (Denmark)	Dong Jiong; Poul-Erik Høyer Larsen	15; 6	17; 18	11; 15
2	(China) (Denmark)	Sun Jun; Thomas Stuer-Lauridsen	15; 5	15; 8
3	(China) (Denmark)	Lin Liwen; Peter Rasmussen	12; 15	3; 15
4	(China) (Denmark)	Huang Zhanzhong / Jiang Xin; Jon Holst-Christensen / Jim Laugesen	15; 12	15; 7
5	(China) (Denmark)	Ge Cheng / Tao Xiaoqiang; Michael Søgaard / Henrik Svarrer	8; 15	15; 17

=== Semi-final 2 ===
Indonesia
3
Queen Elizabeth Stadium
24 May 1996, 18:30 UTC+8

South Korea
2

			1	2	3
1	(Indonesia) (South Korea)	Joko Suprianto; Park Sung-woo	18; 17	15; 1
2	(Indonesia) (South Korea)	Alan Budikusuma; Lee Gwang-jin	15; 5	15; 9
3	(Indonesia) (South Korea)	Ardy Wiranata; Ahn Jae-chang	8; 15	3; 15
4	(Indonesia) (South Korea)	Rexy Mainaky / Ricky Subagja; Ha Tae-kwon / Kang Kyung-jin	15; 10	15; 7
5	(Indonesia) (South Korea)	Antonius Ariantho / Denny Kantono; Kim Dong-moon / Park Joo-bong	0; 15	5; 15

== Final ==
Indonesia
5
Queen Elizabeth Stadium
26 May 1996, 18:30 UTC+8

Denmark
0

			1	2	3
1	(Indonesia) (Denmark)	Joko Suprianto; Poul-Erik Høyer Larsen	18; 14	15; 8
2	(Indonesia) (Denmark)	Rexy Mainaky / Ricky Subagja; Jon Holst-Christensen / Jim Laugesen	15; 5	15; 7
3	(Indonesia) (Denmark)	Hariyanto Arbi; Thomas Stuer-Lauridsen	15; 8	15; 8
4	(Indonesia) (Denmark)	Rudy Gunawan / Bambang Suprianto; Michael Søgaard / Henrik Svarrer	15; 7	14; 18	15; 9
5	(Indonesia) (Denmark)	Alan Budikusuma; Peter Rasmussen	15; 9	15; 6
