= 2004 Thomas & Uber Cup =

Tournament details
- Dates: 7 May – 16 May
- Edition: 23rd (Thomas Cup); 20th (Uber Cup)
- Level: International
- Venue: Istora Gelora Bung Karno
- Location: Jakarta, Indonesia

The 2004 Thomas & Uber Cup was held from 7 May to 16 May 2004 in Jakarta, Indonesia. It was the 23rd edition of the World Men's Team Badminton Championships, Thomas Cup, and the 20th edition of World Women's Team Badminton Championships, Uber Cup.

After a 12-year drought China finally lifted their fifth title of Thomas Cup and also won their ninth title of Uber Cup.

== Host city selection ==
Indonesia, Japan, and the United States are the countries to submit a bid for hosting the event. Indonesia was selected as host during IBF council meeting in Birmingham.

== Teams ==
The following nations from 5 continents, shown by region, qualified for the 2004 Thomas & Uber Cup. Of the 16 nations, defending champions of Uber Cup, China, and host nation as well as defending champion of Thomas Cup, Indonesia and its Uber Cup team qualified automatically and did not play the qualification round.

=== Thomas & Uber Cup ===
- China
- Denmark
- Germany
- Indonesia
- Japan
- Malaysia
- (South Korea) Korea
- South Africa

=== Thomas Cup ===
- England
- Thailand
- New Zealand
- United States

=== Uber Cup ===
- Australia
- Canada
- Chinese Taipei
- Netherlands

== Medal summary ==
=== Medalists ===
Event	Gold	Silver	Bronze
Thomas Cup	China	Denmark	South Korea
Thomas Cup	China	Denmark	Indonesia
Uber Cup	China	South Korea	Japan
Uber Cup	China	South Korea	Denmark

=== Medal table ===
* Host nation (Indonesia)

Rank	Nation	Gold	Silver	Bronze	Total
1	China	2	0	0	2
2	Denmark	0	1	1	2
2	South Korea	0	1	1	2
4	Indonesia*	0	0	1	1
4	Japan	0	0	1	1
Totals (5 entries)		2	2	4	8

== Thomas Cup ==
=== Group stage ===
==== Group A ====
Pos	Team	Pld	W	L	GF	GA	GD	PF	PA	PD	Pts	Qualification
1	China	2	2	0	20	1	+19	304	157	+147	2	Quarter-finals
2	Indonesia (H)	2	1	1	11	10	+1	261	212	+49	1	Round of 16
3	United States	2	0	2	0	20	−20	104	300	−196	0	Round of 16

Source: BadmintonCN
(H) Host

7 May 2004
19:00 UTC+7

China	5–0	United States
Report

Istora Gelora Bung Karno, Jakarta

8 May 2004
19:00 UTC+7

Indonesia	5–0	United States
Report

Istora Gelora Bung Karno, Jakarta

10 May 2004
19:00 UTC+7

Indonesia	0–5	China
Report

Istora Gelora Bung Karno, Jakarta

==== Group B ====
Pos	Team	Pld	W	L	GF	GA	GD	PF	PA	PD	Pts	Qualification
1	South Korea	2	2	0	20	0	+20	302	123	+179	2	Quarter-finals
2	Germany	2	1	1	8	13	−5	203	250	−47	1	Round of 16
3	New Zealand	2	0	2	3	18	−15	153	285	−132	0	Round of 16

Source: BadmintonCN.com

7 May 2004
14:30 UTC+7

South Korea	5–0	New Zealand
Report

Istora Gelora Bung Karno, Jakarta

8 May 2004
14:30 UTC+7

Germany	4–1	New Zealand
Report

Istora Gelora Bung Karno, Jakarta

9 May 2004
19:00 UTC+7

South Korea	5–0	Germany
Report

Istora Gelora Bung Karno, Jakarta

==== Group C ====
Pos	Team	Pld	W	L	GF	GA	GD	PF	PA	PD	Pts	Qualification
1	Malaysia	2	2	0	20	2	+18	320	144	+176	2	Quarter-finals
2	Thailand	2	1	1	12	10	+2	275	205	+70	1	Round of 16
3	South Africa	2	0	2	0	20	−20	54	300	−246	0	Round of 16

Source: BadmintonCN.com

7 May 2004
14:30 UTC+7

Malaysia	5–0	South Africa
Report

Istora Gelora Bung Karno, Jakarta

8 May 2004
14:30 UTC+7

Thailand	5–0	South Africa
Report

Istora Gelora Bung Karno, Jakarta

9 May 2004
19:00 UTC+7

Malaysia	5–0	Thailand
Report

Istora Gelora Bung Karno, Jakarta

==== Group D ====
Pos	Team	Pld	W	L	GF	GA	GD	PF	PA	PD	Pts	Qualification
1	Denmark	2	2	0	20	2	+18	316	178	+138	2	Quarter-finals
2	Japan	2	1	1	7	14	−7	206	264	−58	1	Round of 16
3	England	2	0	2	5	16	−11	195	275	−80	0	Round of 16

Source: BadmintonCN.com

7 May 2004
19:00 UTC+7

Denmark	5–0	England
Report

Istora Gelora Bung Karno, Jakarta

9 May 2004
14:30 UTC+7

Japan	3–2	England
Report

Istora Gelora Bung Karno, Jakarta

10 May 2004
14:30 UTC+7

Denmark	5–0	Japan
Report

Istora Gelora Bung Karno, Jakarta

=== Knockout stage ===
==== Bracket ====
Round of 16
China
Bye
Japan	3
South Africa	0
South Korea
Bye
Thailand	3
England	1
Malaysia
Bye
Indonesia	3
New Zealand	0
Denmark
Bye
Germany	3
United States	0

Quarter-finals
China	3
Japan	0
South Korea	3
Thailand	1
Malaysia	1
Indonesia	3
Denmark	3
Germany	1

Semi-finals
China	3
South Korea	0
Indonesia	2
Denmark	3

Final
China	3
Denmark	1

==== Round of 16 ====
11 May 2004
14:30 UTC+7

Indonesia	3–0	New Zealand
Report

Istora Gelora Bung Karno, Jakarta

11 May 2004
14:30 UTC+7

Germany	3–0	United States
Report

Istora Gelora Bung Karno, Jakarta

11 May 2004
19:30 UTC+7

Japan	3–0	South Africa
Report

Istora Gelora Bung Karno, Jakarta

11 May 2004
19:30 UTC+7

Thailand	3–1	England
Report

Istora Gelora Bung Karno, Jakarta

==== Quarter-finals ====
12 May 2004
19:00 UTC+7

China	3–0	Japan
Report

Istora Gelora Bung Karno, Jakarta

12 May 2004
19:00 UTC+7

South Korea	3–1	Thailand
Report

Istora Gelora Bung Karno, Jakarta

12 May 2004
19:00 UTC+7

Indonesia	3–1	Malaysia
Report

Istora Gelora Bung Karno, Jakarta

12 May 2004
19:00 UTC+7

Denmark	3–1	Germany
Report

Istora Gelora Bung Karno, Jakarta

==== Semi-finals ====
14 May 2004
14:30 UTC+7

China	3–0	South Korea
Report

Istora Gelora Bung Karno, Jakarta

14 May 2004
19:00 UTC+7

Indonesia	2–3	Denmark
Report

Istora Gelora Bung Karno, Jakarta

==== Final ====
16 May 2004
19:00 UTC+7

China	3–1	Denmark
Report

Istora Gelora Bung Karno, Jakarta

2004 Thomas Cup winner

China
Fifth title

== Uber Cup ==
=== Group stage ===
==== Group W ====
Pos	Team	Pld	W	L	GF	GA	GD	PF	PA	PD	Pts	Qualification
1	China	2	2	0	20	2	+18	267	86	+181	2	Quarter-finals
2	Netherlands	2	1	1	7	16	−9	167	267	−100	1	Round of 16
3	Indonesia (H)	2	0	2	7	16	−9	166	247	−81	0	Round of 16

Source: BadmintonCN
(H) Host

7 May 2004
14:30 UTC+7

China	5–0	Indonesia
Report

Istora Gelora Bung Karno, Jakarta

9 May 2004
14:30 UTC+7

Netherlands	3–2	Indonesia
Report

Istora Gelora Bung Karno, Jakarta

10 May 2004
14:30 UTC+7

Indonesia	0–5	China
Report

Istora Gelora Bung Karno, Jakarta

==== Group X ====
Pos	Team	Pld	W	L	GF	GA	GD	PF	PA	PD	Pts	Qualification
1	Chinese Taipei	2	2	0	18	3	+15	243	86	+157	2	Quarter-finals
2	Germany	2	1	1	11	8	+3	167	143	+24	1	Round of 16
3	South Africa	2	0	2	0	18	−18	41	222	−181	0	Round of 16

Source: BadmintonCN.com

7 May 2004
19:00 UTC+7

Chinese Taipei	5–0	South Africa
Report

Istora Gelora Bung Karno, Jakarta

9 May 2004
14:30 UTC+7

Germany	4–1	South Africa
Report

Istora Gelora Bung Karno, Jakarta

10 May 2004
14:30 UTC+7

Chinese Taipei	5–0	Germany
Report

Istora Gelora Bung Karno, Jakarta

==== Group Y ====
Pos	Team	Pld	W	L	GF	GA	GD	PF	PA	PD	Pts	Qualification
1	Denmark	2	2	0	17	7	+10	260	197	+63	2	Quarter-finals
2	Japan	2	1	1	14	10	+4	259	220	+39	1	Round of 16
3	Malaysia	2	0	2	5	19	−14	189	291	−102	0	Round of 16

Source: BadmintonCN.com

7 May 2004
14:30 UTC+7

Japan	4–1	Malaysia
Report

Istora Gelora Bung Karno, Jakarta

8 May 2004
14:30 UTC+7

Denmark	5–0	Malaysia
Report

Istora Gelora Bung Karno, Jakarta

9 May 2004
19:00 UTC+7

Japan	2–3	Denmark
Report

Istora Gelora Bung Karno, Jakarta

==== Group Z ====
Pos	Team	Pld	W	L	GF	GA	GD	PF	PA	PD	Pts	Qualification
1	South Korea	2	2	0	20	0	+20	252	64	+188	2	Quarter-finals
2	Australia	2	1	1	10	12	−2	190	211	−21	1	Round of 16
3	Canada	2	0	2	2	20	−18	105	272	−167	0	Round of 16

Source: BadmintonCN.com

7 May 2004
19:00 UTC+7

South Korea	5–0	Canada
Report

Istora Gelora Bung Karno, Jakarta

8 May 2004
19:00 UTC+7

Australia	5–0	Canada
Report

Istora Gelora Bung Karno, Jakarta

10 May 2004
14:30 UTC+7

South Korea	5–0	Australia
Report

Istora Gelora Bung Karno, Jakarta

=== Knockout stage ===
==== Bracket ====
Round of 16
China
Bye
Malaysia	3
Australia	0
Chinese Taipei
Bye
Japan	3
Canada	0
Denmark
Bye
Netherlands	3
South Africa	0
South Korea
Bye
Indonesia	3
Germany	0

Quarter-finals
China	3
Malaysia	0
Chinese Taipei	2
Japan	3
Denmark	3
Netherlands	2
South Korea	3
Indonesia	1

Semi-finals
China	3
South Korea	0
Indonesia	2
Denmark	3

Final
China	3
Denmark	1

==== Round of 16 ====
11 May 2004
14:30 UTC+7

Germany	0–3	Indonesia
Report

Istora Gelora Bung Karno, Jakarta

11 May 2004
14:30 UTC+7

Netherlands	3–0	South Africa
Report

Istora Gelora Bung Karno, Jakarta

11 May 2004
19:30 UTC+7

Australia	0–3	Malaysia
Report

Istora Gelora Bung Karno, Jakarta

11 May 2004
19:30 UTC+7

Japan	3–0	Canada
Report

Istora Gelora Bung Karno, Jakarta

==== Quarter-finals ====
12 May 2004
14:30 UTC+7

China	3–0	Malaysia
Report

Istora Gelora Bung Karno, Jakarta

12 May 2004
14:30 UTC+7

Chinese Taipei	2–3	Japan
Report

Istora Gelora Bung Karno, Jakarta

12 May 2004
14:30 UTC+7

Denmark	3–2	Netherlands
Report

Istora Gelora Bung Karno, Jakarta

12 May 2004
14:30 UTC+7

South Korea	3–1	Indonesia
Report

Istora Gelora Bung Karno, Jakarta

==== Semi-finals ====
13 May 2004
14:30 UTC+7

China	3–0	Japan
Report

Istora Gelora Bung Karno, Jakarta

13 May 2004
19:00 UTC+7

South Korea	2–3	Denmark
Report

Istora Gelora Bung Karno, Jakarta

==== Final ====
15 May 2004
19:00 UTC+7

China	3–1	South Korea
Report

Istora Gelora Bung Karno, Jakarta

2004 Uber Cup winner

China
Ninth title
