= 1996 Uber Cup group stage =

Badminton team Tournament in Hong Kong

The 1996 Uber Cup group stage was held at Queen Elizabeth Stadium in Hong Kong from 16 to 20 May 1996.

The group stage was first stage of the tournament where only the two highest-placing teams in each of the two groups advanced to the knockout stage.

== Draw ==
The 8 teams will be drawn into two groups each containing four teams.

=== Group composition ===
Group
Group A	Group B
China; Indonesia; Japan; Russia	Denmark; England; Hong Kong (Host); South Korea

== Group A ==
Pos	Team	Pld	W	L	GF	GA	GD	PF	PA	PD	Pts	Qualification
1	China	3	3	0	30	2	+28	399	180	+219	3	Advance to semi-finals
2	Indonesia	3	2	1	22	11	+11	329	250	+79	2	Advance to semi-finals
3	Japan	3	1	2	11	20	−9	254	294	−40	1	
4	Russia	3	0	3	0	30	−30	120	378	−258	0	

Source: The Straits Times

=== Indonesia vs Japan ===
Indonesia
5
Queen Elizabeth Stadium
16 May 1996, 12:00 UTC+8

Japan
0

			1	2	3
1	(Indonesia) (Japan)	Susi Susanti; Hisako Mizui	11; 3	11; 5
2	(Indonesia) (Japan)	Finarsih / Lili Tampi; Tomomi Matsuo / Masako Sakamoto	15; 7	15; 13
3	(Indonesia) (Japan)	Mia Audina; Yasuko Mizui	11; 6	11; 2
4	(Indonesia) (Japan)	Deyana Lomban / Eliza Nathanael; Aiko Miyamura / Akiko Miyamura	15; 5	15; 10
5	(Indonesia) (Japan)	Meiluawati; Takako Ida	2; 11	11; 4	11; 0

=== China vs Russia ===
China
5
Queen Elizabeth Stadium
16 May 1996, 12:00 UTC+8

Russia
0

			1	2	3
1	(China) (Russia)	Ye Zhaoying; Elena Rybkina	11; 1	11; 2
2	(China) (Russia)	Ge Fei / Gu Jun; Elena Rybkina / Marina Yakusheva	15; 1	15; 2
3	(China) (Russia)	Han Jingna; Marina Yakusheva	11; 7	11; 4
4	(China) (Russia)	Qin Yiyuan / Tang Yongshu; Nadezhda Chervyakova / Ella Karachkova	15; 6	15; 8
5	(China) (Russia)	Wang Chen; Elena Sukhareva	11; 4	11; 8

=== Indonesia vs China ===
Indonesia
0
Queen Elizabeth Stadium
18 May 1996, 12:00 UTC+8

China
5

			1	2	3
1	(Indonesia) (China)	Mia Audina; Ye Zhaoying	4; 11	4; 11
2	(Indonesia) (China)	Eliza Nathanael / Zelin Resiana; Ge Fei / Gu Jun	15; 10	9; 15	5; 15
3	(Indonesia) (China)	Lidya Djaelawijaya; Han Jingna	12; 10	3; 11	8; 11
4	(Indonesia) (China)	Finarsih / Lili Tampi; Qin Yiyuan / Tang Yongshu	3; 15	8; 15
5	(Indonesia) (China)	Meiluawati; Wang Chen	2; 11	2; 11

=== Japan vs Russia ===
Japan
5
Queen Elizabeth Stadium
18 May 1996, 18:30 UTC+8

Russia
0

			1	2	3
1	(Japan) (Russia)	Hisako Mizui; Elena Rybkina	11; 3	11; 2
2	(Japan) (Russia)	Yasuko Mizui; Marina Yakusheva	11; 4	11; 6
3	(Japan) (Russia)	Aiko Miyamura / Akiko Miyamura; Nadezhda Chervyakova / Ella Karachkova	15; 4	15; 2
4	(Japan) (Russia)	Takako Ida; Elena Sukhareva	11; 4	11; 5
5	(Japan) (Russia)	Tomomi Matsuo / Masako Sakamoto; Elena Rybkina / Marina Yakusheva	15; 1	15; 8

=== Indonesia vs Russia ===
Indonesia
5
Queen Elizabeth Stadium
18 May 1996, 12:00 UTC+8

Russia
0

			1	2	3
1	(Indonesia) (Russia)	Susi Susanti; Marina Yakusheva	11; 2	11; 5
2	(Indonesia) (Russia)	Mia Audina; Elena Sukhareva	11; 7	11; 0
3	(Indonesia) (Russia)	Yuliani Santosa; Ella Karachkova	11; 1	11; 1
4	(Indonesia) (Russia)	Eliza Nathanael / Zelin Resiana; Nadezhda Chervyakova / Marina Yakusheva	15; 9	15; 4
5	(Indonesia) (Russia)	Deyana Lomban / Lili Tampi; Ella Karachkova / Elena Sukhareva	15; 3	15; 6

=== China vs Japan ===
China
5
Queen Elizabeth Stadium
18 May 1996, 18:30 UTC+8

Japan
0

			1	2	3
1	(China) (Japan)	Ye Zhaoying; Hisako Mizui	11; 8	11; 6
2	(China) (Japan)	Ge Fei / Gu Jun; Tomomi Matsuo / Masako Sakamoto	15; 2	15; 7
3	(China) (Japan)	Han Jingna; Yasuko Mizui	11; 4	11; 7
4	(China) (Japan)	Chen Ying / Peng Xinyong; Aiko Miyamura / Akiko Miyamura	15; 10	15; 6
5	(China) (Japan)	Zhang Ning; Takako Ida	12; 9	11; 3

== Group B ==
Pos	Team	Pld	W	L	GF	GA	GD	PF	PA	PD	Pts	Qualification
1	South Korea	3	3	0	27	5	+22	388	177	+211	3	Advance to semi-finals
2	Denmark	3	2	1	24	12	+12	387	315	+72	2	Advance to semi-finals
3	England	3	1	2	11	24	−13	286	390	−104	1	
4	Hong Kong (H)	3	0	3	6	27	−21	210	389	−179	0	

Source: The Straits Times
(H) Host

=== South Korea vs Denmark ===
South Korea
3
Queen Elizabeth Stadium
16 May 1996, 18:30 UTC+8

Denmark
2

			1	2	3
1	(South Korea) (Denmark)	Bang Soo-hyun; Camilla Martin	11; 7	11; 8
2	(South Korea) (Denmark)	Gil Young-ah / Jang Hye-ock; Lisbet Stuer-Lauridsen / Marlene Thomsen	10; 15	14; 17
3	(South Korea) (Denmark)	Kim Ji-hyun; Anne Søndergaard	4; 11	11; 1	8; 11
4	(South Korea) (Denmark)	Kim Mee-hyang / Kim Shin-young; Helene Kirkegaard / Rikke Olsen	12; 15	17; 15	15; 3
5	(South Korea) (Denmark)	Ra Kyung-min; Mette Pedersen	11; 7	11; 0

=== England vs Hong Kong ===
England
3
Queen Elizabeth Stadium
16 May 1996, 18:30 UTC+8

Hong Kong
2

			1	2	3
1	(England) (Hong Kong)	Joanne Muggeridge; Ng Ching	11; 9	7; 11	4; 11
2	(England) (Hong Kong)	Emma Chaffin / Joanne Davies; Chan Mei Mei / Chan Oi Ni	10; 15	16; 17
3	(England) (Hong Kong)	Julia Mann; Koon Wai Chee	11; 8	11; 4
4	(England) (Hong Kong)	Gillian Gowers / Joanne Muggeridge; Ng Ching / Tung Chau Man	3; 15	17; 14	15; 4
5	(England) (Hong Kong)	Alison Humby; Chan Mei Mei	12; 9	11; 4

=== Denmark vs England ===
Denmark
4
Queen Elizabeth Stadium
18 May 1996, 12:00 UTC+8

England
1

			1	2	3
1	(Denmark) (England)	Camilla Martin; Julia Mann	11; 4	6; 11	11; 3
2	(Denmark) (England)	Helene Kirkegaard / Rikke Olsen; Gillian Gowers / Joanne Muggeridge	17; 14	9; 15	15; 5
3	(Denmark) (England)	Anne Søndergaard; Alison Humby	12; 9	5; 11	4; 11
4	(Denmark) (England)	Ann Jørgensen / Lotte Olsen; Emma Chaffin / Sara Hardaker	15; 12	15; 7
5	(Denmark) (England)	Mette Pedersen; Tanya Groves	11; 8	11; 4

=== South Korea vs Hong Kong ===
South Korea
5
Queen Elizabeth Stadium
18 May 1996, 18:30 UTC+8

Hong Kong
0

			1	2	3
1	(South Korea) (Hong Kong)	Bang Soo-hyun; Ng Ching	11; 3	11; 0
2	(South Korea) (Hong Kong)	Kim Shin-young / Park Soo-yun; Chan Mei Mei / Chan Oi Ni	15; 0	15; 5
3	(South Korea) (Hong Kong)	Ra Kyung-min; Koon Wai Chee	11; 1	11; 0
4	(South Korea) (Hong Kong)	Gil Young-ah / Jang Hye-ock; Ng Ching / Tung Chau Man	15; 2	15; 1
5	(South Korea) (Hong Kong)	Lee Joo-hyun; Chan Mei Mei	11; 3	11; 8

=== South Korea vs England ===
South Korea
5
Queen Elizabeth Stadium
20 May 1996, 12:00 UTC+8

England
0

			1	2	3
1	(South Korea) (England)	Ra Kyung-min; Julia Mann	11; 2	11; 1
2	(South Korea) (England)	Gil Young-ah / Jang Hye-ock; Gillian Gowers / Joanne Muggeridge	15; 3	15; 1
3	(South Korea) (England)	Lee Joo-hyun; Alison Humby	11; 5	12; 10
4	(South Korea) (England)	Kim Shin-young / Park Soo-yun; Joanne Davies / Sara Hardaker	15; 8	15; 7
5	(South Korea) (England)	Chung Jae-hee; Tanya Groves	11; 3	11; 4

=== Denmark vs Hong Kong ===
Denmark
5
Queen Elizabeth Stadium
20 May 1996, 18:30 UTC+8

Hong Kong
0

			1	2	3
1	(Denmark) (Hong Kong)	Camilla Martin; Ng Ching	11; 1	11; 1
2	(Denmark) (Hong Kong)	Ann Jørgensen / Lotte Olsen; Chan Mei Mei / Chan Oi Ni	15; 3	15; 8
3	(Denmark) (Hong Kong)	Anne Søndergaard; Koon Wai Chee	11; 2	11; 6
4	(Denmark) (Hong Kong)	Lisbet Stuer-Lauridsen / Marlene Thomsen; Ng Ching / Tung Chau Man	17; 14	7; 15	15; 7
5	(Denmark) (Hong Kong)	Mette Pedersen; Chan Mei Mei	11; 7	11; 2
