= 2004 Thomas Cup knockout stage =

2004 Knockout stage of the Thomas Cup badminton team championship

The knockout stage for the 2004 Thomas Cup in Jakarta began on 11 May 2004 with the round of 16 and ended on 16 May 2004 with the final.

== Group results ==
The winners of each group were exempted until the quarter-finals stage while the rest of the teams competed in the round of 16 for a place in the final eight.

Group	Winners	Runners-up	Third place
A	China	Indonesia	United States
B	South Korea	Germany	New Zealand
C	Malaysia	Thailand	South Africa
D	Denmark	Japan	England

== Bracket ==
Round of 16
China
Bye
Japan	3
South Africa	0
South Korea
Bye
Thailand	3
England	1
Malaysia
Bye
Indonesia	3
New Zealand	0
Denmark
Bye
Germany	3
United States	0

Quarter-finals
China	3
Japan	0
South Korea	3
Thailand	1
Malaysia	1
Indonesia	3
Denmark	3
Germany	1

Semi-finals
China	3
South Korea	0
Indonesia	2
Denmark	3

Final
China	3
Denmark	1

== Round of 16 ==
=== Indonesia vs New Zealand ===
The last time Indonesia played against New Zealand in the Thomas Cup was in 1970, when Indonesia won 9–0 in the first round. Indonesia advanced to the quarter-finals after defeating New Zealand 3–0, with all their players winning in two straight games.

Indonesia
3
Istora Gelora Bung Karno
11 May 2004, 14:30 UTC+7

New Zealand
0

			1	2	3
1	(Indonesia) (New Zealand)	Sony Dwi Kuncoro; John Moody	15; 3	15; 2
2	(Indonesia) (New Zealand)	Luluk Hadiyanto / Alvent Yulianto; John Gordon / Daniel Shirley	15; 5	15; 8
3	(Indonesia) (New Zealand)	Simon Santoso; Geoff Bellingham	15; 3	15; 2
4	(Indonesia) (New Zealand)	Eng Hian / Flandy Limpele; Geoff Bellingham / John Moody				not played
5	(Indonesia) (New Zealand)	Wiempie Mahardi; Craig Cooper				not played

=== Germany vs United States ===
Germany, who were the runners-up of Group B played against the United States who finished on the bottom of Group A. The Germans beat the American side 3–0 and won all their games in two games.

Germany
3
Istora Gelora Bung Karno
11 May 2004, 14:30 UTC+7

United States
0

			1	2	3
1	(Germany) (United States)	Björn Joppien; Eric Go	17; 14	15; 5
2	(Germany) (United States)	Jens Roch; Howard Bach	15; 0	15; 2
3	(Germany) (United States)	Marc Zwiebler; Kevin Han	15; 2	15; 4
4	(Germany) (United States)	Jochen Cassel / Joachim Tesche; Tony Gunawan / Khan Malaythong				not played
5	(Germany) (United States)	Ingo Kindervater / Björn Siegemund; Howard Bach / Kevin Han				not played

=== Japan vs South Africa ===
Debutants South Africa who placed third in Group C faced off against Japan who finished as runners-up in Group D. The South Africans were eliminated from the competition after a 3–0 loss against their Japanese opponents.

Japan
3
Istora Gelora Bung Karno
11 May 2004, 19:30 UTC+7

South Africa
0

			1	2	3
1	(Japan) (South Africa)	Shōji Satō; Chris Dednam	15; 6	15; 7
2	(Japan) (South Africa)	Sho Sasaki; Dean Potgieter	15; 5	15; 4
3	(Japan) (South Africa)	Tōru Matsumoto; Willem Viljoen	15; 1	15; 2
4	(Japan) (South Africa)	Keita Masuda / Tadashi Ōtsuka; Chris Dednam / Roelof Dednam				not played
5	(Japan) (South Africa)	Shuichi Nakao / Shōji Satō; Dorian James / Willem Viljoen				not played

=== Thailand vs England ===
Thailand, who were the runners-up of Group C faced England who finished on the bottom of Group D. The first match saw Thailand's Boonsak Ponsana up against Aamir Ghaffar of England. The Englishman produced a shocker when he won the first set 15–13, but the Thai managed to retaliate and won the next two games 15–12, 15–11 to win Thailand's first point in the tie.

England later equalized when Anthony Clark and Nathan Robertson defeated Tesana Panvisvas and Pramote Teerawiwatana 15–6, 9–15, 15–10. In the third match, Thirayu Laohathaimongkol defeated Andrew South in two games to regain Thailand's lead. Thailand won the tie 3–1 after the team won their second doubles match.

Thailand
3
Istora Gelora Bung Karno
11 May 2004, 19:30 UTC+7

England
1

			1	2	3
1	(Thailand) (England)	Boonsak Ponsana; Aamir Ghaffar	13; 15	15; 12	15; 11
2	(Thailand) (England)	Tesana Panvisvas / Pramote Teerawiwatana; Anthony Clark / Nathan Robertson	6; 15	15; 9	10; 15
3	(Thailand) (England)	Thirayu Laohathaimongkol; Andrew South	15; 11	15; 6
4	(Thailand) (England)	Patapol Ngernsrisuk / Sudket Prapakamol; Robert Blair / David Lindley	17; 14	15; 9
5	(Thailand) (England)	Anuphap Theeraratsakul; Toby Honey				not played

== Quarter-finals ==
=== China vs Japan ===
The two teams competed against each other earlier at the semi-finals of the Asian Thomas Cup Preliminaries, where the Chinese team won 3–0.

China won the first point when Lin Dan defeated Shōji Satō of Japan 15–9, 15–13. The second match also went China's way with Cai Yun and Fu Haifeng beating Keita Masuda and Tadashi Ōtsuka 15–4, 15–5. China closed down the tie 3–0 when Chen Hong won the team's third point, beating Hidetaka Yamada in the second singles match.

China
3
Istora Gelora Bung Karno
12 May 2004, 19:00 UTC+7

Japan
0

			1	2	3
1	(China) (Japan)	Lin Dan; Shōji Satō	15; 9	15; 13
2	(China) (Japan)	Cai Yun / Fu Haifeng; Keita Masuda / Tadashi Ōtsuka	15; 4	15; 5
3	(China) (Japan)	Chen Hong; Hidetaka Yamada	15; 2	15; 2
4	(China) (Japan)	Chen Qiqiu / Sang Yang; Shuichi Nakao / Shuichi Sakamoto				not played
5	(China) (Japan)	Bao Chunlai; Sho Sasaki				not played

=== South Korea vs Thailand ===
Thailand opened the game with a 1–0 lead when Boonsak Ponsana performed an upset by defeating world number 5 Lee Hyun-il 17–16, 15–3. The South Koreans levelled up the tie 1–1 when Lee Dong-soo and Yoo Yong-sung defeated Tesana Panvisvas and Pramote Teerawiwatana 15–5, 7–15, 15–11. South Korea took a 2–1 lead after Shon Seung-mo defeated Thirayu Laohathaimongkol in two games. Thailand were eliminated in the quarter-finals after the team lost the second doubles match.

South Korea
3
Istora Gelora Bung Karno
12 May 2004, 19:00 UTC+7

Thailand
1

			1	2	3
1	(South Korea) (Thailand)	Lee Hyun-il; Boonsak Ponsana	16; 17	13; 15
2	(South Korea) (Thailand)	Lee Dong-soo / Yoo Yong-sung; Tesana Panvisvas / Pramote Teerawiwatana	15; 5	7; 15	15; 11
3	(South Korea) (Thailand)	Shon Seung-mo; Thirayu Laohathaimongkol	15; 0	15; 2
4	(South Korea) (Thailand)	Kim Dong-moon / Kim Yong-hyun; Patapol Ngernsrisuk / Sudket Prapakamol	15; 3	15; 11
5	(South Korea) (Thailand)	Park Tae-sang; Adisak Wiriyaphadungphong				not played

=== Indonesia vs Malaysia ===
The two teams last played against each other in the final of the 2002 Thomas Cup, where Indonesia won 3–2 after trailing 2–1 against Malaysia.

In the first singles match, Wong Choong Hann won the first game 15–12 against Sony Dwi Kuncoro. Kuncoro then fought back and won the next two games 15–1, 15–6 to earn Indonesia's first point in the tie. Malaysia equalized the score 1–1 when Choong Tan Fook and Lee Wan Wah defeated Luluk Hadiyanto and Alvent Yulianto 15–12, 15–6. Indonesia regained their lead when Taufik Hidayat defeated Roslin Hashim 15–10, 15–2.

In the second doubles match, Indonesia's Eng Hian and Flandy Limpele took the first game from Malaysian's Chan Chong Ming and Chew Choon Eng 15–9. The Malaysians fought back in the second game with a tight score of 15–13. The match went Indonesia's way when the Indonesians won the third game 15–12.

Indonesia
3
Istora Gelora Bung Karno
12 May 2004, 19:00 UTC+7

Malaysia
1

			1	2	3
1	(Indonesia) (Malaysia)	Sony Dwi Kuncoro; Wong Choong Hann	12; 15	15; 1	15; 6
2	(Indonesia) (Malaysia)	Luluk Hadiyanto / Alvent Yulianto; Choong Tan Fook / Lee Wan Wah	12; 15	6; 15
3	(Indonesia) (Malaysia)	Taufik Hidayat; Roslin Hashim	15; 10	15; 2
4	(Indonesia) (Malaysia)	Eng Hian / Flandy Limpele; Chan Chong Ming / Chew Choon Eng	15; 9	13; 15	15; 12
5	(Indonesia) (Malaysia)	Simon Santoso; Muhammad Hafiz Hashim				not played

=== Denmark vs Germany ===
The two teams last met in the final of the 2004 European Thomas Cup Preliminaries where the Danes won 3–0 against their German opponents.

Denmark started the tie with a 2–0 lead with victories from their singles player Kenneth Jonassen as well as the doubles pair of Lars Paaske and Jonas Rasmussen. Germany then took a surprise victory against the Danes when Jens Roch beat Anders Boesen 15–6, 15–3 in the second singles match. The second doubles match saw Denmark's Jens Eriksen and Martin Lundgaard Hansen defeated Jochen Cassel and Kristof Hopp 15–8, 15–7, eliminating Germany in the quarter-finals.

Denmark
3
Istora Gelora Bung Karno
12 May 2004, 19:00 UTC+7

Germany
1

			1	2	3
1	(Denmark) (Germany)	Kenneth Jonassen; Björn Joppien	15; 9	15; 11
2	(Denmark) (Germany)	Lars Paaske / Jonas Rasmussen; Ingo Kindervater / Björn Siegemund	15; 2	15; 3
3	(Denmark) (Germany)	Anders Boesen; Jens Roch	6; 15	3; 15
4	(Denmark) (Germany)	Jens Eriksen / Martin Lundgaard Hansen; Jochen Cassel / Kristof Hopp	15; 8	15; 7
5	(Denmark) (Germany)	Peter Rasmussen; Marc Zwiebler				not played

== Semi-finals ==
=== China vs South Korea ===
The last meeting between the two teams was in the 2002 Thomas Cup group stage with China defeating South Korea 4–1.

China took the first victory with Lin Dan defeating Lee Hyun-il 15–11, 15–2 in the first singles match. China won the second point when Cai Yun and Fu Haifeng beat Kim Dong-moon and Lee Dong-soo 15–13, 15–11. China won their third point after Bao Chunlai defeated Shon Seung-mo 15–12, 15–4 and booked themselves a place in the final.

China
3
Istora Gelora Bung Karno
14 May 2004, 14:30 UTC+7

South Korea
0

			1	2	3
1	(China) (South Korea)	Lin Dan; Lee Hyun-il	15; 11	15; 2
2	(China) (South Korea)	Fu Haifeng / Cai Yun; Kim Dong-moon / Lee Dong-soo	15; 13	15; 11
3	(China) (South Korea)	Bao Chunlai; Shon Seung-mo	15; 2	15; 5
4	(China) (South Korea)	Sang Yang / Zheng Bo; Kim Yong-hyun / Yim Bang-eun				not played
5	(China) (South Korea)	Xia Xuanze; Park Tae-sang				not played

=== Indonesia vs Denmark ===
This was the third consecutive time Indonesia faced Denmark in the Thomas Cup semi-finals since 1998, with Indonesia winning the last two meetings 3–0 and 3–2.

Indonesia opened the tie with a 1–0 lead when Sony Dwi Kuncoro defeated Peter Gade in the first singles match. For the first doubles match, Indonesia rested their first men's doubles pair and played their second best doubles pair. This proved costly for the Indonesians as the team lost the doubles match to Denmark 13–15, 7–15 and gifted the Danes their first point in the tie. Indonesia got their lead back when Taufik Hidayat defeated Kenneth Jonassen in three games.

In the second doubles match, Indonesia played their scratch pair of Candra Wijaya and Tri Kusharjanto against Jens Eriksen and Martin Lundgaard Hansen. The Danes took the first game 15–10 but lost the second set tamely to the Indonesians. The Danes then came back and won the third game 15–4 to help Denmark level against their opponents and it all went down to the third singles match. Indonesia's Simon Santoso was up against Denmark's Peter Rasmussen. Indonesia's title was in jeopardy when Santoso lost the first game to Rasmussen 3–15. Rasmussen then won the second game 15–13 and won the winning point for Denmark in the tie.

Indonesia
2
Istora Gelora Bung Karno
14 May 2004, 19:00 UTC+7

Denmark
3

			1	2	3
1	(Indonesia) (Denmark)	Sony Dwi Kuncoro; Peter Gade	15; 4	15; 8
2	(Indonesia) (Denmark)	Eng Hian / Flandy Limpele; Lars Paaske / Jonas Rasmussen	13; 15	7; 15
3	(Indonesia) (Denmark)	Taufik Hidayat; Kenneth Jonassen	15; 5	13; 15	15; 7
4	(Indonesia) (Denmark)	Tri Kusharjanto / Candra Wijaya; Jens Eriksen / Martin Lundgaard Hansen	10; 15	15; 2	4; 15
5	(Indonesia) (Denmark)	Simon Santoso; Peter Rasmussen	3; 15	3; 15

== Final ==
=== China vs Denmark ===
The final of the 2004 Thomas Cup was played on 16 May 2004. The last time the teams met was in the semi-finals of the 1996 Thomas Cup where Denmark won 3–2.

In the first singles match, Lin Dan won the first game against Peter Gade 15–8. In the second game, Gade trailed 2–5 but managed to level the score 6–6 and lead the second game 13–9. Lin came back to level the score 13–13 before closing the game 15–13 and winning China's first point in the tie. The second match featured a battle between the world number one pair of Lars Paaske and Jonas Rasmussen, and world number two pair Cai Yun and Fu Haifeng. The Danes won the first game 17–16 despite making a lot of unforced errors and won the second game 15–6 to help Denmark draw level in the tie.

In the second singles match, China's Bao Chunlai played against Denmark's Kenneth Jonassen. Jonassen played with confidence and took the first game 15–12. In the second game, Jonassen trailed 9–14 against Bao but came back to level the score 14–14. The Dane was at match point at 15–14 but could not convert and lost the second game narrowly to Bao 15–17. Bao turned up the pace in the deciding game and won 15–12 to give China the lead.

Denmark's chances of levelling the tie depended on the crucial second doubles match. Recently crowned All England champions Jens Eriksen and Martin Lundgaard Hansen lead the first game 11–8. However, the Chinese pair of Sang Yang and Zheng Bo came back to win the opening game 15–13. The two then won the second game 15–8 and the final point for China.

China
3
Istora Gelora Bung Karno
16 May 2004, 19:00 UTC+7

Denmark
1

			1	2	3
1	(China) (Denmark)	Lin Dan; Peter Gade	15; 8	15; 13
2	(China) (Denmark)	Fu Haifeng / Cai Yun; Lars Paaske / Jonas Rasmussen	16; 17	6; 15
3	(China) (Denmark)	Bao Chunlai; Kenneth Jonassen	12; 15	17; 15	15; 12
4	(China) (Denmark)	Sang Yang / Zheng Bo; Jens Eriksen / Martin Lundgaard Hansen	15; 13	15; 8
5	(China) (Denmark)	Xia Xuanze; Peter Rasmussen				not played
