= Thailand International (badminton) =

Badminton tournament in Thailand

The Thailand International (Thai: การการแข่งขันแบดมินตันนานาชาติ ปุ้มปุ้ยแชมเปี้ยนชิพ) is an open international badminton tournament held in Thailand. It is one of the most important tournaments in Thailand behind the Thailand Open and Thailand Masters. The tournament is also known as the Thailand Satellite or Smiling Fish International and became an International Challenge level tournament in 2016. The name of the tournament comes from that of a Thai food company from Trang, where the competition is held. In 2023, the tournament was renamed as Thailand International Challenge.

== Winners ==
=== Thailand International Challenge ===
Year	Men's singles	Women's singles	Men's doubles	Women's doubles	Mixed doubles	Ref
1998	(Thailand) Anupap Thiraratsakul	(China) Hui Li	(Thailand) Kitipon Kitikul (Thailand) Tesana Panvisvas	(China) Hui Li (China) Lina Kong	(Thailand) Tesana Panvisvas (Thailand) Saralee Thungthongkam	
1999	(Malaysia) Yap Yong Jyen	(Singapore) Liu Zhen	(Thailand) Patapol Ngernsrisuk (Thailand) Sudket Prapakamol	(China) Cai Liying (China) Dai Xiaoyan	(Thailand) Anurak Thiraratsakul (Thailand) Methinee Narawirawuth	
2000	(Thailand) Anupap Thiraratsakul	(Singapore) Jiang Yanmei	(China) Ge Cheng (China) Tao Xiaoqiang	(Thailand) Sathinee Chankrachangwong (Thailand) Thitikan Duangsiri	(China) Tao Xiaoqiang (China) Tao Xiaolan	
2001	(Malaysia) Jason Wong	(Singapore) Liu Zhen	(Thailand) Patapol Ngernsrisuk (Thailand) Khunakorn Sudhisodhi	(Thailand) Sathinee Chankrachangwong (Thailand) Sujitra Ekmongkolpaisarn	(Thailand) Sudket Prapakamol (Thailand) Sujitra Ekmongkolpaisarn	
2002	(Malaysia) Allan Tai	(Singapore) Liu Zhen	(Indonesia) Hendri Kurniawan Saputra (Indonesia) Denny Setiawan	(Thailand) Duanganong Aroonkesorn (Thailand) Kunchala Voravichitchaikul	(Thailand) Panuwat Ngernsrisul (Thailand) Kunchala Voravichitchaikul	
2003	(Thailand) Boonsak Ponsana	(Thailand) Salakjit Ponsana	(Thailand) Patapol Ngernsrisuk (Thailand) Sudket Prapakamol	(Thailand) Duanganong Aroonkesorn (Thailand) Salakjit Ponsana	(Thailand) Songphon Anugritayawon (Thailand) Duanganong Aroonkesorn	
2004	(Singapore) Kendrick Lee Yen Hui	(Thailand) Salakjit Ponsana	(Thailand) Nuttaphon Narkthong (Thailand) Panuwat Ngernsrisul	(Thailand) Duanganong Aroonkesorn (Thailand) Kunchala Voravichitchaikul	(Thailand) Songphon Anugritayawon (Thailand) Duanganong Aroonkesorn	
2005	(South Korea) Shon Seung-mo	(Thailand) Molthila Meemeak	(South Korea) Han Sang-hoon (South Korea) Hwang Ji-man	no competition	(Thailand) Songphon Anugritayawon (Thailand) Kunchala Voravichitchaikul	
2006	(Indonesia) Tommy Sugiarto	(Thailand) Soratja Chansrisukot	(Thailand) Patapol Ngernsrisuk (Thailand) Sudket Prapakamol	(Thailand) Duanganong Aroonkesorn (Thailand) Kunchala Voravichitchaikul	(Indonesia) Lingga Lie (Indonesia) Yulianti	
2007	(Thailand) Poompat Sapkulchananart	(Thailand) Salakjit Ponsana	(Hong Kong) Alroy Tanama Putra (Hong Kong) Hui Wai Ho	(Indonesia) Richi Puspita Dili (Indonesia) Yulianti	(Indonesia) Tontowi Ahmad (Indonesia) Yulianti	
2008	(Thailand) Tanongsak Saensomboonsuk	(Thailand) Porntip Buranaprasertsuk	(Indonesia) Fernando Kurniawan (Indonesia) Lingga Lie	(Japan) Oku Yukina (Japan) Megumi Taruno	(Indonesia) Lingga Lie (Indonesia) Keshya Nurvita Hanadia	
2009	(Thailand) Tanongsak Saensomboonsuk	(Thailand) Porntip Buranaprasertsuk	(Thailand) Bodin Isara (Thailand) Maneepong Jongjit	(Thailand) Porntip Buranaprasertsuk (Thailand) Sapsiree Taerattanachai	(Thailand) Patipat Chalardchaleam (Thailand) Savitree Amitapai	
2010	(India) Ajay Jayaram	(Thailand) Ratchanok Intanon	(Malaysia) Muhammad Syawal Mohd Ismail (Malaysia) Iskandar Zulkarnain Zainuddin	(Thailand) Rodjana Chuthabunditkul (Thailand) Soikhaimuk Hongchookeat	(Thailand) Patipat Chalardchaleam (Thailand) Savitree Amitapai	
2011	(Singapore) Ashton Chen	(Japan) Yuka Kusunose	(Malaysia) Nelson Heg (Malaysia) Teo Ee Yi	(Thailand) Chayanit Chalardchaleam (Thailand) Pattharaporn Jindapol	(Malaysia) Tan Aik Quan (Malaysia) Lai Pei Jing	
2012	(Malaysia) Soong Joo Ven	(Malaysia) Florah Ng Siew Fong	(Malaysia) Darren Isaac Devadass (Malaysia) Tai An Khang	(Japan) Aya Shimozaki (Japan) Emi Moue	(Malaysia) Wong Fai Yin (Malaysia) Shevon Jemie Lai	
2013	(Thailand) Sitthikom Thammasin	(Thailand) Rawinda Prajongjai	(Thailand) Wannawat Ampunsuwan (Thailand) Patipat Chalardchaleam	(Thailand) Lam Narissapat (Thailand) Puttita Supajirakul	(Thailand) Patipat Chalardchaleam (Thailand) Jongkongphan Kittiharakul	
2014	(Thailand) Khosit Phetpradab	(Japan) Rei Nagata	(Thailand) Watchara Buranakuea (Thailand) Trawut Potieng	(Japan) Mayu Matsumoto (Japan) Wakana Nagahara	(Thailand) Watchara Buranakuea (Thailand) Phataimas Muenwong	
2015	(Indonesia) Andre Marteen	(Thailand) Supanida Katethong	(Thailand) Wannawat Ampunsuwan (Thailand) Tinn Isriyanate	(Thailand) Supanida Katethong (Thailand) Panjarat Pransopon	(Thailand) Parinyawat Thongnuam (Thailand) Phataimas Muenwong	
2016	(Indonesia) Krishna Adi Nugraha	(Indonesia) Dinar Dyah Ayustine	(Singapore) Danny Bawa Chrisnanta (Singapore) Hendra Wijaya	(Indonesia) Suci Rizky Andini (Indonesia) Yulfira Barkah	(Singapore) Terry Hee Yong Kai (Singapore) Tan Wei Han	
2017	(Thailand) Pannawit Thongnuam	(China) Hui Xirui	(China) Kang Jun (China) Zhang Sijie	(Japan) Nami Matsuyama (Japan) Chiharu Shida	(China) Wang Sijie (China) Du Peng	
2018–2022	Not held					
2023	(Japan) Minoru Koga	(Japan) Asuka Takahashi	(Thailand) Chaloempon Charoenkitamorn (Thailand) Nanthakarn Yordphaisong	(Chinese Taipei) Liu Chiao-yun (Chinese Taipei) Wang Yu-qiao	(Thailand) Ruttanapak Oupthong (Thailand) Jhenicha Sudjaipraparat	
2024	(Thailand) Panitchaphon Teeraratsakul	(Japan) Riko Gunji	(Malaysia) Kang Khai Xing (Malaysia) Aaron Tai	(Thailand) Laksika Kanlaha (Thailand) Phataimas Muenwong	(Thailand) Pakkapon Teeraratsakul (Thailand) Phataimas Muenwong	
2025	(Indonesia) Richie Duta Richardo	(Thailand) Anyapat Phichitpreechasak	(Indonesia) Ali Faathir Rayhan (Indonesia) Devin Artha Wahyudi	(Japan) Sayaka Hirota (Japan) Maiko Kawazoe	(Thailand) Phuwanat Horbanluekit (Thailand) Fungfa Korpthammakit	
2026 I	(Japan) Rei Miyashita	(Thailand) Thamonwan Nithiittikrai	(Indonesia) M. Nawaf Khoiriyansyah (Indonesia) Adrian Pratama	(Thailand) Phattharin Aiamvareesrisakul (Thailand) Sarisa Janpeng	(Thailand) Ratchapol Makkasasithorn (Thailand) Nattamon Laisuan	
2026 II						

=== Thailand International Series ===
Year	Men's singles	Women's singles	Men's doubles	Women's doubles	Mixed doubles	Ref
2023	(Japan) Riki Takei	(Japan) Runa Kurihara	(Japan) Kazuki Shibata (Japan) Naoki Yamada	(South Korea) Kim Yu-jung (South Korea) Lee Yeon-woo	(South Korea) Park Kyung-hoon (South Korea) Kim Yu-jung	
2024	(South Korea) Jeon Hyeok-jin	(Thailand) Tidapron Kleebyeesun	(South Korea) Choi Sol-gyu (South Korea) Lim Su-min	(Thailand) Tidapron Kleebyeesun (Thailand) Nattamon Laisuan	(Thailand) Phuwanat Horbanluekit (Thailand) Fungfa Korpthammakit	
2025 I	(Chinese Taipei) Wang Po-wei	(Thailand) Tidapron Kleebyeesun	(China) Chen Xujun (China) Guo Ruohan	(Thailand) Tidapron Kleebyeesun (Thailand) Nattamon Laisuan	(China) Gao Jiaxuan (China) Wu Mengying	
2025 II	(Indonesia) Christian Adinata	(Thailand) Tidapron Kleebyeesun	(Thailand) Narut Saengkham (Thailand) Apichasit Teerawiwat	(Japan) Mikoto Aiso (Japan) Momoha Niimi	(Malaysia) Wee Yee Hern (Malaysia) Chan Wen Tse	
2026	(Japan) Koya Iwano	(Chinese Taipei) Su Xiao-ting	(Thailand) Thanawin Madee (Thailand) Pongsakorn Thongkham	(South Korea) Jang Min-yoon (South Korea) Kim Bo-min	(Thailand) Ratchapol Makkasasithorn (Thailand) Patida Srisawat	

== Performances by countries ==
=== Thailand International Challenge ===
As of 2026 I edition

Rank	Nation	MS	WS	MD	WD	XD	Total
1	Thailand*	10	12	11	13	16	62
2	Indonesia	4	1	4	2	3	14
3	Japan	2	4		5		11
3	Malaysia	4	1	4		2	11
5	China		2	2	2	2	8
5	Singapore	2	4	1		1	8
7	South Korea	1		1			2
8	Chinese Taipei				1		1
8	Hong Kong			1			1
8	India	1					1
Total		24	24	24	23	24	119

=== Thailand International Series ===
As of 2026 edition

Rank	Nation	MS	WS	MD	WD	XD	Total
1	Thailand*		3	2	2	2	9
2	Japan	2	1	1	1		5
2	South Korea	1		1	2	1	5
4	China			1		1	2
4	Chinese Taipei	1	1				2
6	Indonesia	1					1
6	Malaysia					1	1
Total		5	5	5	5	5	25

* Host nation

== See also ==
- Thailand Open
- Thailand Masters
