= 2004 Thomas Cup group stage =

Badminton team tournament in Jakarta

The 2004 Thomas Cup group stage was held at Istora Gelora Bung Karno in Jakarta, Indonesia, from 7 to 10 May 2004.

The group stage was first stage of the tournament where the group winner advanced to the quarter-finals while the remaining teams advanced to the round of 16 in the knockout stages.

== Draw ==
The original draw for the tournament was conducted on 13 March 2004. The 12 teams will be drawn into four groups each containing three teams.

=== Group composition ===
Group
Group A	Group B	Group C	Group D
China; Indonesia (Host); United States	Germany; South Korea; New Zealand	Malaysia; South Africa; Thailand	Denmark; England; Japan

== Group A ==
Pos	Team	Pld	W	L	MF	MA	MD	GF	GA	GD	PF	PA	PD	Pts	Qualification
1	China	2	2	0	10	0	+10	20	1	+19	304	157	+147	2	Quarter-finals
2	Indonesia (H)	2	1	1	5	5	0	11	10	+1	261	212	+49	1	Round of 16
3	United States	2	0	2	0	10	−10	0	20	−20	104	300	−196	0	Round of 16

Source: BadmintonCN
(H) Host

=== China vs United States ===
China
5
Istora Gelora Bung Karno
7 May 2004, 19:00 UTC+7

United States
0

			1	2	3
1	(China) (United States)	Lin Dan; Eric Go	15; 0	15; 2
2	(China) (United States)	Sang Yang / Zheng Bo; Tony Gunawan / Khan Malaythong	15; 5	15; 5
3	(China) (United States)	Chen Hong; Howard Bach	15; 3	15; 3
4	(China) (United States)	Cai Yun / Fu Haifeng; Howard Bach / Kevin Han	15; 12	15; 13
5	(China) (United States)	Xia Xuanze; Kevin Han	15; 2	15; 1

=== Indonesia vs United States ===
Indonesia
5
Istora Gelora Bung Karno
8 May 2004, 19:00 UTC+7

United States
0

			1	2	3
1	(Indonesia) (United States)	Sony Dwi Kuncoro; Eric Go	15; 4	15; 8
2	(Indonesia) (United States)	Taufik Hidayat; Khan Malaythong	15; 2	15; 2
3	(Indonesia) (United States)	Simon Santoso; Kevin Han	15; 11	15; 4
4	(Indonesia) (United States)	Eng Hian / Flandy Limpele; Eric Go / Khan Malaythong	15; 8	15; 3
5	(Indonesia) (United States)	Luluk Hadiyanto / Alvent Yulianto; Howard Bach / Tony Gunawan	15; 11	15; 5

=== Indonesia vs China ===
Indonesia
0
Istora Gelora Bung Karno
10 May 2004, 19:00 UTC+7

China
5

			1	2	3
1	(Indonesia) (China)	Sony Dwi Kuncoro; Lin Dan	16; 17	3; 15
2	(Indonesia) (China)	Luluk Hadiyanto / Alvent Yulianto; Cai Yun / Fu Haifeng	9; 15	10; 15
3	(Indonesia) (China)	Taufik Hidayat; Bao Chunlai	13; 15	6; 15
4	(Indonesia) (China)	Tri Kusharjanto / Candra Wijaya; Sang Yang / Zheng Bo	13; 15	15; 2	11; 15
5	(Indonesia) (China)	Simon Santoso; Xia Xuanze	11; 15	4; 15

== Group B ==
Pos	Team	Pld	W	L	MF	MA	MD	GF	GA	GD	PF	PA	PD	Pts	Qualification
1	South Korea	2	2	0	10	0	+10	20	0	+20	302	123	+179	2	Quarter-finals
2	Germany	2	1	1	4	6	−2	8	13	−5	203	250	−47	1	Round of 16
3	New Zealand	2	0	2	1	9	−8	3	18	−15	153	285	−132	0	Round of 16

Source: BadmintonCN.com

=== South Korea vs New Zealand ===
South Korea
5
Istora Gelora Bung Karno
7 May 2004, 14:30 UTC+7

New Zealand
0

			1	2	3
1	(South Korea) (New Zealand)	Lee Hyun-il; John Moody	15; 6	15; 7
2	(South Korea) (New Zealand)	Kim Yong-hyun / Yim Bang-eun; Geoff Bellingham / Craig Cooper	15; 8	15; 2
3	(South Korea) (New Zealand)	Shon Seung-mo; Geoff Bellingham	15; 8	15; 5
4	(South Korea) (New Zealand)	Kim Dong-moon / Lee Dong-soo; John Gordon / Daniel Shirley	15; 8	15; 6
5	(South Korea) (New Zealand)	Jang Young-soo; John Gordon	15; 2	15; 3

=== Germany vs New Zealand ===
Germany
4
Istora Gelora Bung Karno
8 May 2004, 14:30 UTC+7

New Zealand
1

			1	2	3
1	(Germany) (New Zealand)	Björn Joppien; John Moody	15; 5	15; 2
2	(Germany) (New Zealand)	Jens Roch; Geoff Bellingham	15; 6	15; 5
3	(Germany) (New Zealand)	Marc Zwiebler; John Gordon	9; 15	0; 15
4	(Germany) (New Zealand)	Ingo Kindervater / Björn Siegemund; Geoff Bellingham / Craig Cooper	15; 5	15; 11
5	(Germany) (New Zealand)	Kristof Hopp / Thomas Tesche; John Gordon / Daniel Shirley	6; 15	15; 7	15; 12

=== South Korea vs Germany ===
South Korea
5
Istora Gelora Bung Karno
9 May 2004, 19:00 UTC+7

Germany
0

			1	2	3
1	(South Korea) (Germany)	Lee Hyun-il; Jens Roch	15; 6	15; 6
2	(South Korea) (Germany)	Lee Dong-soo / Yoo Yong-sung; Jochen Cassel / Joachim Tesche	15; 1	15; 6
3	(South Korea) (Germany)	Shon Seung-mo; Roman Spitko	17; 14	15; 8
4	(South Korea) (Germany)	Kim Dong-moon / Kim Yong-hyun; Ingo Kindervater / Björn Siegemund	15; 9	15; 9
5	(South Korea) (Germany)	Park Tae-sang; Marc Zwiebler	15; 2	15; 7

== Group C ==
Pos	Team	Pld	W	L	MF	MA	MD	GF	GA	GD	PF	PA	PD	Pts	Qualification
1	Malaysia	2	2	0	10	0	+10	20	2	+18	320	144	+176	2	Quarter-finals
2	Thailand	2	1	1	5	5	0	12	10	+2	275	205	+70	1	Round of 16
3	South Africa	2	0	2	0	10	−10	0	20	−20	54	300	−246	0	Round of 16

Source: BadmintonCN.com

=== Malaysia vs South Africa ===
Malaysia
5
Istora Gelora Bung Karno
7 May 2004, 14:30 UTC+7

South Africa
0

			1	2	3
1	(Malaysia) (South Africa)	Wong Choong Hann; Chris Dednam	15; 1	15; 4
2	(Malaysia) (South Africa)	Choong Tan Fook / Lee Wan Wah; Chris Dednam / Roelof Dednam	15; 5	15; 3
3	(Malaysia) (South Africa)	Lee Chong Wei; Dean Potgieter	15; 1	15; 1
4	(Malaysia) (South Africa)	Chew Choon Eng / Koo Kien Keat; Dorian James / Willem Viljoen	15; 3	15; 1
5	(Malaysia) (South Africa)	Muhammad Hafiz Hashim; Willem Viljoen	15; 0	15; 0

=== Thailand vs South Africa ===
Thailand
5
Istora Gelora Bung Karno
8 May 2004, 14:30 UTC+7

South Africa
0

			1	2	3
1	(Thailand) (South Africa)	Thirayu Laohathaimongkol; Chris Dednam	15; 1	15; 2
2	(Thailand) (South Africa)	Anuphap Theeraratsakul; Dean Potgieter	15; 8	15; 5
3	(Thailand) (South Africa)	Adisak Wiriyaphadungphong; Willem Viljoen	15; 1	15; 1
4	(Thailand) (South Africa)	Tesana Panvisvas / Pramote Teerawiwatana; Chris Dednam / Dorian James	15; 5	15; 6
5	(Thailand) (South Africa)	Patapol Ngernsrisuk / Sudket Prapakamol; Roelof Dednam / Dean Potgieter	15; 3	15; 3

=== Malaysia vs Thailand ===
Malaysia
5
Istora Gelora Bung Karno
9 May 2004, 19:00 UTC+7

Thailand
0

			1	2	3
1	(Malaysia) (Thailand)	Roslin Hashim; Boonsak Ponsana	15; 8	15; 4
2	(Malaysia) (Thailand)	Chew Choon Eng / Koo Kien Keat; Tesana Panvisvas / Pramote Teerawiwatana	15; 10	8; 15	15; 12
3	(Malaysia) (Thailand)	Lee Chong Wei; Thirayu Laohathaimongkol	15; 11	15; 3
4	(Malaysia) (Thailand)	Wong Choong Hann / Chan Chong Ming; Patapol Ngernsrisuk / Sudket Prapakamol	15; 11	15; 11
5	(Malaysia) (Thailand)	Lee Tsuen Seng; Adisak Wiriyaphadungphong	10; 15	17; 15	15; 10

== Group D ==
Pos	Team	Pld	W	L	MF	MA	MD	GF	GA	GD	PF	PA	PD	Pts	Qualification
1	Denmark	2	2	0	10	0	+10	20	2	+18	316	178	+138	2	Quarter-finals
2	Japan	2	1	1	3	7	−4	7	14	−7	206	264	−58	1	Round of 16
3	England	2	0	2	2	8	−6	5	16	−11	195	275	−80	0	Round of 16

Source: BadmintonCN.com

=== Denmark vs England ===
Denmark
5
Istora Gelora Bung Karno
7 May 2004, 19:00 UTC+7

England
0

			1	2	3
1	(Denmark) (England)	Peter Gade; Aamir Ghaffar	15; 5	15; 4
2	(Denmark) (England)	Lars Paaske / Jonas Rasmussen; Nathan Robertson / Anthony Clark	15; 12	9; 15	15; 12
3	(Denmark) (England)	Anders Boesen; Andrew South	15; 3	15; 5
4	(Denmark) (England)	Jens Eriksen / Mathias Boe; David Lindley / Kristian Roebuck	15; 12	15; 6
5	(Denmark) (England)	Peter Rasmussen; Nicholas Kidd	15; 7	15; 7

=== Japan vs England ===
Japan
3
Istora Gelora Bung Karno
9 May 2004, 14:30 UTC+7

England
2

			1	2	3
1	(Japan) (England)	Shōji Satō; Aamir Ghaffar	15; 10	15; 10
2	(Japan) (England)	Tadashi Ōtsuka / Shuichi Sakamoto; Robert Blair / Anthony Clark	7; 15	8; 15
3	(Japan) (England)	Hidetaka Yamada; Andrew Smith	15; 6	15; 12
4	(Japan) (England)	Keita Masuda / Shuichi Nakao; David Lindley / Nathan Robertson	9; 15	2; 15
5	(Japan) (England)	Sho Sasaki; Nicholas Kidd	15; 6	15; 3

=== Denmark vs Japan ===
Denmark
5
Istora Gelora Bung Karno
10 May 2004, 14:30 UTC+7

Japan
0

			1	2	3
1	(Denmark) (Japan)	Peter Gade; Hidetaka Yamada	15; 2	15; 10
2	(Denmark) (Japan)	Kenneth Jonassen; Sho Sasaki	15; 2	15; 10
3	(Denmark) (Japan)	Niels Christian Kaldau; Tōru Matsumoto	15; 13	7; 15	15; 5
4	(Denmark) (Japan)	Lars Paaske / Jonas Rasmussen; Keita Masuda / Tadashi Ōtsuka	15; 12	15; 9
5	(Denmark) (Japan)	Jens Eriksen / Martin Lundgaard Hansen; Tōru Matsumoto / Shuichi Nakao	15; 3	15; 9
