= 1996 Uber Cup knockout stage =

1996 Knockout stage of the Thomas Cup badminton team championship

The knockout stage for the 1996 Uber Cup in Hong Kong began on 23 May 1996 with the semi-finals and ended on 26 May 1996 with the final.

== Qualified teams ==
The top two placed teams from each of the two groups qualified for this stage.

Group	Winners	Runners-up
A	China	Indonesia
B	South Korea	Denmark

== Bracket ==
Semi-finals
China	5
Denmark	0
Indonesia	4
South Korea	1

Final
China	1
Indonesia	4

== Semi-finals ==
=== Semi-final 1 ===
China
5
Queen Elizabeth Stadium
23 May 1996, 12:00 UTC+8

Denmark
0

			1	2	3
1	(China) (Denmark)	Ye Zhaoying; Camilla Martin	11; 8	11; 3
2	(China) (Denmark)	Wang Chen; Anne Søndergaard	11; 0	11; 8
3	(China) (Denmark)	Zhang Ning; Mette Pedersen	11; 5	11; 2
4	(China) (Denmark)	Ge Fei / Gu Jun; Helene Kirkegaard / Rikke Olsen	17; 14	15; 3
5	(China) (Denmark)	Qin Yiyuan / Tang Yongshu; Lotte Olsen / Ann Jørgensen	15; 6	18; 15

=== Semi-final 2 ===
Indonesia
4
Queen Elizabeth Stadium
23 May 1996, 18:30 UTC+8

South Korea
1

			1	2	3
1	(Indonesia) (South Korea)	Susi Susanti; Bang Soo-hyun	11; 8	11; 3
2	(Indonesia) (South Korea)	Mia Audina; Kim Ji-hyun	11; 6	11; 12	11; 4
3	(Indonesia) (South Korea)	Yuliani Santosa; Ra Kyung-min	4; 11	4; 11
4	(Indonesia) (South Korea)	Eliza Nathanael / Zelin Resiana; Gil Young-ah / Jang Hye-ock	15; 3	17; 16
5	(Indonesia) (South Korea)	Finarsih / Lili Tampi; Kim Mee-hyang / Kim Shin-young	10; 15	15; 6	15; 7

== Final ==
Indonesia
4
Queen Elizabeth Stadium
25 May 1996, 18:30 UTC+8

China
1

			1	2	3
1	(Indonesia) (China)	Susi Susanti; Ye Zhaoying	4; 11	11; 5	11; 5
2	(Indonesia) (China)	Eliza Nathanael / Zelin Resiana; Ge Fei / Gu Jun	15; 7	8; 15	12; 15
3	(Indonesia) (China)	Mia Audina; Wang Chen	11; 4	11; 6
4	(Indonesia) (China)	Finarsih / Lili Tampi; Qin Yiyuan / Tang Yongshu	15; 9	15; 10
5	(Indonesia) (China)	Meiluawati; Zhang Ning	11; 6	11; 2
