= Tao Xiaoqiang =

Chinese badminton player

Tao Xiaoqiang 陶晓强
Personal information
- Born: 29 November 1973 (age 52) Shanghai, China
- Height: 1.85 m (6 ft 1 in)
- Weight: 79 kg (174 lb)

Sport
- Country: China
- Sport: Badminton
- Handedness: Right
- Event: Men's doubles & Mixed doubles
Medal record
Men's badminton
Representing China
Sudirman Cup
Gold medal – first place	1997 Glasgow	Mixed team
Thomas Cup
Bronze medal – third place	1996 Hong Kong	Men's team

Tao Xiaoqiang (born 29 November 1973) is a Chinese badminton player. He competed in two events at the 1996 Summer Olympics. Tao is also a part of the 1997 Sudirman Cup China championship team.

== Achievements ==
=== IBF World Grand Prix ===
The World Badminton Grand Prix was sanctioned by the International Badminton Federation (IBF) from 1983-2006.

Men's doubles
Year	Tournament	Partner	Opponent	Score	Result
1996	Dutch Open	(China) Ge Cheng	(China) Liu Yong (China) Zhang Wei	11–8, 9–11, 9–4, 7–9, 9–3	(gold) Winner
1996	Polish Open	(China) Ge Cheng	(England) Nick Ponting (England) Julian Robertson	9–15, 15–12, 15–10	(gold) Winner
1996	Russian Open	(China) Ge Cheng	(Russia) Andrey Antropov (Russia) Nikolai Zuyev	15–10, 15–17, 5–15	(silver) Runner-up
1997	China Open	(China) Ge Cheng	(China) Liu Yong (China) Zhang Wei	15–3, 15–7	(gold) Winner

Mixed doubles
Year	Tournament	Partner	Opponent	Score	Result
1996	Malaysia Open	(China) Wang Xiaoyuan	(South Korea) Kim Dong-moon (South Korea) Gil Young-ah	7–15, 9–15	(silver) Runner-Up

=== IBF International ===
Men's doubles
Year	Tournament	Partner	Opponent	Score	Result
2000	Smiling Fish International	(China) Ge Cheng	(Thailand) Patapol Ngernsrisuk (Thailand) Sudket Prapakamol	15–12, 8–15, 15–5	(gold) Winner
2001	China Asia Satellite	(China) Ge Cheng	(China) Jiang Shan (China) Yang Ming	15–6, 15–10	(gold) Winner

Mixed doubles
Year	Tournament	Partner	Opponent	Score	Result
1993	Wimbledon Tournament	(China) Jiang Wen	(England) Chris Hunt (England) Joanne Goode	15–6, 6–15, 13–15	(silver) Runner-up
2000	Smiling Fish International	(China) Tao Xiaolan	(Singapore) Hendri Kurniawan Saputra (Singapore) Jiang Yanmei	15–8, 17–15	(gold) Winner
2001	China Asia Satellite	(China) Tao Xiaolan	(China) Feng Xingqiao (China) Fan Linhua	5–15, 17–15, 15–6	(gold) Winner
