= Ge Cheng =

Chinese badminton player

Ge Cheng 葛成
Personal information
- Born: 20 December 1973 (age 52) Shanghai, China
- Height: 186 cm (6 ft 1 in)
- Weight: 75 kg (165 lb)

Sport
- Country: China
- Sport: Badminton
- Handedness: Right
Medal record
Men's badminton
Representing China
Sudirman Cup
Gold medal – first place	1997 Glasgow	Mixed team
Thomas Cup
Bronze medal – third place	1996 Hong Kong	Men's team
Asian Championships
Bronze medal – third place	1995 Beijing	Men's singles

Ge Cheng (born 20 December 1973) is a Chinese badminton player. He competed in the men's doubles tournament at the 1996 Summer Olympics. Ge is also a part of the 1997 Sudirman Cup China championship team.

== Achievements ==
=== Asian Championships ===
Men's singles
Year	Venue	Opponent	Score	Result
1995	Olympic Sports Center Gymnasium, Beijing, China	(China) Sun Jun	7–15, 6–15	Bronze

=== IBF World Grand Prix ===
The World Badminton Grand Prix was sanctioned by the International Badminton Federation (IBF) from 1983-2006.

Men's doubles
Year	Tournament	Partner	Opponent	Score	Result
1996	Dutch Open	(China) Tao Xiaoqiang	(China) Liu Yong (China) Zhang Wei	11–8, 9–11, 9–4, 7–9, 9–3	(gold) Winner
1996	Polish Open	(China) Tao Xiaoqiang	(England) Nick Ponting (England) Julian Robertson	9–15, 15–12, 15–10	(gold) Winner
1996	Russian Open	(China) Tao Xiaoqiang	(Russia) Andrey Antropov (Russia) Nikolai Zuyev	15–10, 15–17, 5–15	(silver) Runner-up
1997	China Open	(China) Tao Xiaoqiang	(China) Liu Yong (China) Zhang Wei	15–3, 15–7	(gold) Winner

=== IBF International ===
Men's doubles
Year	Tournament	Partner	Opponent	Score	Result
2000	Smiling Fish International	(China) Tao Xiaoqiang	(Thailand) Patapol Ngernsrisuk (Thailand) Sudket Prapakamol	15–12, 8–15, 15–5	(gold) Winner
2001	China Asia Satellite	(China) Tao Xiaoqiang	(China) Jiang Shan (China) Yang Ming	15–6, 15–10	(gold) Winner
