= 1996 Thomas & Uber Cup =

Biennial international badminton team championship

1996 Thomas and Uber Cup 1996年湯姆斯盃和尤伯盃

Tournament details
- Dates: 16–25 May 1996
- Edition: 19th (Thomas Cup); 16th (Uber Cup)
- Level: International
- Nations: 8 (Thomas Cup); 8 (Uber Cup)
- Venue: Queen Elizabeth Stadium
- Location: Hong Kong
- Official website: bwfthomasubercups.com

The 1996 Thomas & Uber Cup was the 19th tournament of the Thomas Cup, and the 16th tournament of the Uber Cup, which are the major international team competitions in world badminton.

The 1996 Thomas and Uber Cup press conference was held in Bank Rakyat Indonesia's building at the Sentra BRI Complex in Sudirman, Central Jakarta. The press conference was led by Putera Sampoerna, the chairman of PT HM Sampoerna Tbk which is the manufacturer of A Mild, the 5th Indonesian largest cigarette brand. A Mild was also the main sponsor of the 1996 Thomas and Uber Cup. The opening and closing ceremony of the tournament was led by Putera Sampoerna.

Indonesia were champions of both the Thomas Cup and the Uber Cup. The men's team defeated Denmark 5–0 in the final to win their tenth Thomas Cup title while the women's team won their third Uber Cup title by defeating China 4–1 in the final.

== Host selection ==
Two days after the final of the 1994 Thomas & Uber Cup, Malaysia submitted a bid to host the 1996 edition of the two tournaments. In September 1994, Hong Kong made their bid to host the Thomas and Uber Cup. Hong Kong was later named hosts in 1996 and the Queen Elizabeth Stadium was selected as the venue to host the tournament.

== Qualification ==
Hong Kong qualified automatically as hosts. Indonesia qualified as title holders of the Thomas Cup and the Uber Cup.

=== Thomas Cup ===
Means of qualification	Date	Venue	Slot	Qualified teams
Host country	January 1996	Hong Kong	1	Hong Kong
1994 Thomas Cup	10 – 21 May 1994	Jakarta	1	Indonesia
European Zone	19 – 26 February 1996	Prague	3	Denmark
European Zone	19 – 26 February 1996	Prague	3	England
European Zone	19 – 26 February 1996	Prague	3	Sweden
Asian Zone	18 – 25 February 1996	Auckland	3	China
Asian Zone	18 – 25 February 1996	Auckland	3	Malaysia
Asian Zone	18 – 25 February 1996	Auckland	3	South Korea
Total			8	

=== Uber Cup ===
Means of qualification	Date	Venue	Slot	Qualified teams
Host country	January 1996	Hong Kong	1	Hong Kong
1994 Uber Cup	10 – 21 May 1994	Jakarta	1	Indonesia
European Zone	19 – 26 February 1996	Prague	3	Denmark
European Zone	19 – 26 February 1996	Prague	3	England
European Zone	19 – 26 February 1996	Prague	3	Russia
Asian Zone	20 – 27 February 1994	Auckland	3	China
Asian Zone	20 – 27 February 1994	Auckland	3	Japan
Asian Zone	20 – 27 February 1994	Auckland	3	South Korea
Total			8	

== Medal summary ==
=== Medalists ===
Event	Gold	Silver	Bronze
Thomas Cup	Indonesia	Denmark	South Korea
Thomas Cup	Indonesia	Denmark	China
Uber Cup	Indonesia	China	South Korea
Uber Cup	Indonesia	China	Denmark

=== Medal table ===
* Host nation (Hong Kong)

Rank	Nation	Gold	Silver	Bronze	Total
1	Indonesia	2	0	0	2
2	China	0	1	1	2
2	Denmark	0	1	1	2
4	South Korea	0	0	2	2
Totals (4 entries)		2	2	4	8

== Thomas Cup ==
=== Group stage ===
==== Group A ====
Pos	Team	Pld	W	L	GF	GA	GD	PF	PA	PD	Pts	Qualification
1	Indonesia	3	3	0	28	8	+20	504	303	+201	3	Advance to semi-finals
2	China	3	2	1	25	11	+14	483	352	+131	2	Advance to semi-finals
3	Sweden	3	1	2	13	24	−11	363	488	−125	1	
4	England	3	0	3	6	29	−23	298	505	−207	0	

Source: The Straits Times

17 May 1996
12:00 UTC+8

Indonesia	3–2	China
Report

Queen Elizabeth Stadium, Hong Kong

17 May 1996
12:00 UTC+8

Sweden	4–1	England
Report

Queen Elizabeth Stadium, Hong Kong

19 May 1996
12:00 UTC+8

Indonesia	5–0	Sweden
Report

Queen Elizabeth Stadium, Hong Kong

19 May 1996
18:30 UTC+8

China	5–0	England
Report

Queen Elizabeth Stadium, Hong Kong

21 May 1996
12:00 UTC+8

Indonesia	5–0	England
Report

Queen Elizabeth Stadium, Hong Kong

21 May 1996
12:00 UTC+8

China	5–0	Sweden
Report

Queen Elizabeth Stadium, Hong Kong

==== Group B ====
Pos	Team	Pld	W	L	GF	GA	GD	PF	PA	PD	Pts	Qualification
1	Denmark	3	3	0	25	11	+14	481	364	+117	3	Advance to semi-finals
2	South Korea	3	2	1	23	10	+13	433	335	+98	2	Advance to semi-finals
3	Malaysia	3	1	2	18	17	+1	437	376	+61	1	
4	Hong Kong (H)	3	0	3	2	30	−28	198	474	−276	0	

Source: The Straits Times
(H) Host

17 May 1996
18:30 UTC+8

Malaysia	2–3	South Korea
Report

Queen Elizabeth Stadium, Hong Kong

17 May 1996
18:30 UTC+8

Denmark	5–0	Hong Kong
Report

Queen Elizabeth Stadium, Hong Kong

19 May 1996
12:00 UTC+8

South Korea	2–3	Denmark
Report

Queen Elizabeth Stadium, Hong Kong

19 May 1996
18:30 UTC+8

Malaysia	5–0	Hong Kong
Report

Queen Elizabeth Stadium, Hong Kong

21 May 1996
18:30 UTC+8

Malaysia	1–4	Denmark
Report

Queen Elizabeth Stadium, Hong Kong

21 May 1996
18:30 UTC+8

South Korea	5–0	Hong Kong
Report

Queen Elizabeth Stadium, Hong Kong

=== Knockout stage ===
==== Bracket ====
Semi-finals
Indonesia	3
South Korea	2
China	2
Denmark	3

Final
Indonesia	5
Denmark	0

==== Semi-finals ====
24 May 1996
12:00 UTC+8

China	2–3	Denmark
Report

Queen Elizabeth Stadium, Hong Kong

24 May 1996
18:30 UTC+8

Indonesia	3–2	South Korea
Report

Queen Elizabeth Stadium, Hong Kong

==== Final ====
26 May 1996
18:30 UTC+8

Indonesia	5–0	Denmark
Report

Queen Elizabeth Stadium, Hong Kong

1996 Thomas Cup winner

Indonesia
Tenth title

== Uber Cup ==
=== Group stage ===
==== Group A ====
Pos	Team	Pld	W	L	GF	GA	GD	PF	PA	PD	Pts	Qualification
1	China	3	3	0	30	2	+28	399	180	+219	3	Advance to semi-finals
2	Indonesia	3	2	1	22	11	+11	329	250	+79	2	Advance to semi-finals
3	Japan	3	1	2	11	20	−9	254	294	−40	1	
4	Russia	3	0	3	0	30	−30	120	378	−258	0	

Source: The Straits Times

16 May 1996
12:00 UTC+8

Indonesia	5–0	Japan
Report

Queen Elizabeth Stadium, Hong Kong

16 May 1996
12:00 UTC+8

China	5–0	Russia
Report

Queen Elizabeth Stadium, Hong Kong

18 May 1996
12:00 UTC+8

Indonesia	0–5	China
Report

Queen Elizabeth Stadium, Hong Kong

18 May 1996
18:30 UTC+8

Japan	4–1	Russia
Report

Queen Elizabeth Stadium, Hong Kong

20 May 1996
12:00 UTC+8

Indonesia	5–0	Russia
Report

Queen Elizabeth Stadium, Hong Kong

20 May 1996
18:30 UTC+8

China	5–0	Japan
Report

Queen Elizabeth Stadium, Hong Kong

==== Group B ====
Pos	Team	Pld	W	L	GF	GA	GD	PF	PA	PD	Pts	Qualification
1	South Korea	3	3	0	27	5	+22	388	177	+211	3	Advance to semi-finals
2	Denmark	3	2	1	24	12	+12	387	315	+72	2	Advance to semi-finals
3	England	3	1	2	11	24	−13	286	390	−104	1	
4	Hong Kong (H)	3	0	3	6	27	−21	210	389	−179	0	

Source: The Straits Times
(H) Host

16 May 1996
18:30 UTC+8

South Korea	5–0	Denmark
Report

Queen Elizabeth Stadium, Hong Kong

16 May 1996
18:30 UTC+8

England	3–2	Hong Kong
Report

Queen Elizabeth Stadium, Hong Kong

18 May 1996
12:00 UTC+8

Denmark	4–1	England
Report

Queen Elizabeth Stadium, Hong Kong

18 May 1996
18:30 UTC+8

South Korea	4–1	Hong Kong
Report

Queen Elizabeth Stadium, Hong Kong

20 May 1996
12:00 UTC+8

South Korea	5–0	England
Report

Queen Elizabeth Stadium, Hong Kong

20 May 1996
18:30 UTC+8

Denmark	5–0	Hong Kong
Report

Queen Elizabeth Stadium, Hong Kong

=== Knockout stage ===
==== Bracket ====
Semi-finals
China	5
Denmark	0
Indonesia	4
South Korea	1

Final
China	1
Indonesia	4

==== Semi-finals ====
23 May 1996
12:00 UTC+8

China	5–0	Denmark
Report

Queen Elizabeth Stadium, Hong Kong

23 May 1996
18:30 UTC+8

Indonesia	4–1	South Korea
Report

Queen Elizabeth Stadium, Hong Kong

==== Final ====
25 May 1996
18:30 UTC+8

Indonesia	4–1	China
Report

Queen Elizabeth Stadium, Hong Kong

1996 Uber Cup winner

Indonesia
Third title
