= Jane Crabtree =

Australian badminton player (born 1981)

Jane Crabtree (born 31 July 1981) is a badminton player from Australia.

Crabtree competed in badminton at the 2004 Summer Olympics in women's doubles with partner Kate Wilson-Smith. They were defeated by Pernille Harder and Mette Schjoldager of Denmark in the round of 32. Crabtree also competed in the singles at the 2002 Commonwealth Games in Manchester.
