= Valérie St. Jacques =

Canadian badminton player

Personal information
- Born: 1983 (age 42–43) Montreal, Quebec, Canada

Sport
- Country: Canada
- Sport: Badminton
- Handedness: Right

Women's doubles
- Highest ranking: 81 (14 October 2010)
Medal record
Badminton
Representing Canada
Pan Am Championships
Gold medal – first place	2009 Guadalajara	Women's doubles

Valérie St. Jacques (born 1983) is a former Canadian badminton player who competed in international level events. She won the Pan American women's doubles title at the 2009 Pan Am Badminton Championships in Guadalajara partnered with Milaine Cloutier.
