= Lenny Permana =

Australian badminton player

Lenny Permana is a female badminton player from Australia. She was chosen by the Olympic Council as one of the recipient for John Landy scholarship program in 2020.

Born in Indonesia, and competed for the Indonesian team previously, reached the quarter-final of the World Junior Championship. She moved to Australia to study and then joined the Australian Badminton team. Permana played badminton at the 2004 Summer Olympics. She represented Australia at 2002 Commonwealth Games as well in Manchester and have played for Australia in many occasions including Uber Cup, Oceania Championship, Whyte Trophy and the mixed team events Sudirman Cup. Her highest world ranking was top 20.

Permana's players's achievements including multiple recipients in various years of Badminton Victoria Sportwoman of the Year, Best Personality Players, Best Performance Player, Cliff Cut Award Best Sportmanship Player.

Whilst still competing, Permana has started coaching in many levels as a results produced many State level badminton players compete for Victorian junior State teams when working with BAV (Badminton Academy of Victoria) for many years til she has opened her new club Infinity Badminton and coaches at Mitcham and Doncaster, with many upcoming juniors players. Some of those players later on become Olympian themselves.

Permana is dedicated her time to coach local Primary and Secondary School around her area voluntarily for several years. She was Badminton Australia under 15 National Coach in 2016–2018, coached many Victorian junior State teams and prior to pandemic was helping Badminton AUS Senior team to win Oceania Championship in 2020.

As a results of her contribution, she was awarded Badminton Australia Volunteer of the Year, recipient of Badminton Victoria Service Award for at least 15 years service to badminton and 2019 Award recipient of Outstanding Community Contribution Award (Primary School Category).

Badminton Victoria is dedicated a "Lenny Permana" trophy for Division 2 winner at All Victorian Primary School Badminton Championship. Permana is also one of BWF ShuttleTime tutor.
